= 2013–14 ISU Speed Skating World Cup – Men's 500 metres =

The 500 meters distance for men in the 2013–14 ISU Speed Skating World Cup was contested over 12 races on six occasions, out of a total of six World Cup occasions for the season, with the first occasion taking place in Calgary, Alberta, Canada, on 8–10 November 2013, and the final occasion taking place in Heerenveen, Netherlands, on 14–16 March 2014.

Dutchman Ronald Mulder won the cup, while his twin brother Michel Mulder came second. Fellow Dutchman, defending champion Jan Smeekens, completed an all-Dutch podium.

== Top three ==
Position	Athlete	Points	Previous season
1	(Netherlands) Ronald Mulder	782	4th
2	(Netherlands) Michel Mulder	728	3rd
3	(Netherlands) Jan Smeekens	655	1st

== Race medallists ==
Occasion #	Location	Date	Gold	Time	Silver	Time	Bronze	Time	Report
1	Calgary, Alberta, Canada	8 November	Ronald Mulder; Netherlands	34.41	Mo Tae-bum; South Korea	34.523	Jamie Gregg; Canada	34.526	
1	Calgary, Alberta, Canada	10 November	Tucker Fredricks; United States	34.46	Mo Tae-bum; South Korea	34.47	Jamie Gregg; Canada; Ronald Mulder; Netherlands	34.529	
2	Salt Lake City, United States	15 November	Gilmore Junio; Canada; Joji Kato; Japan	34.258			Michel Mulder; Netherlands	34.26	
2	Salt Lake City, United States	17 November	Keiichiro Nagashima; Japan	34.24	Ronald Mulder; Netherlands	34.25	Mo Tae-bum; South Korea	34.28	
3	Astana, Kazakhstan	30 November	Artyom Kuznetsov; Russia	34.85	Dmitry Lobkov; Russia	34.86	Ronald Mulder; Netherlands	34.87	
3	Astana, Kazakhstan	1 December	Keiichiro Nagashima; Japan	34.69	Mo Tae-bum; South Korea	34.87	Artyom Kuznetsov; Russia	34.92	
4	Berlin, Germany	6 December	Michel Mulder; Netherlands	34.80	Mo Tae-bum; South Korea	34.89	Keiichiro Nagashima; Japan	35.01	
4	Berlin, Germany	8 December	Mo Tae-bum; South Korea	34.876	Joji Kato; Japan	34.878	Michel Mulder; Netherlands	34.95	
5	Inzell, Germany	8 March	Ronald Mulder; Netherlands	34.96	Gilmore Junio; Canada	35.02	Nico Ihle; Germany	35.10	
5	Inzell, Germany	9 March	Jan Smeekens; Netherlands	34.91	Nico Ihle; Germany	34.97	Michel Mulder; Netherlands	35.00	
6	Heerenveen, Netherlands	15 March	Ronald Mulder; Netherlands	34.81	Jan Smeekens; Netherlands	34.97	Gilmore Junio; Canada	35.00	
6	Heerenveen, Netherlands	16 March	Jan Smeekens; Netherlands	34.78	Ronald Mulder; Netherlands	34.89	Michel Mulder; Netherlands	34.64	

== Standings ==
Standings as of 16 March 2014 (end of the season).

#	Name	Nat.	CAL1	CAL2	SLC1	SLC2	AST1	AST2	BER1	BER2	INZ1	INZ2	HVN1	HVN2	Total
1	Ronald Mulder	(Netherlands)	100	70	24	80	70	32			100	36	150	120	782
2	Michel Mulder	(Netherlands)	60	32	70	60	21	45	100	70	50	70	45	105	728
3	Jan Smeekens	(Netherlands)	40	40	45	12	60	28			60	100	120	150	655
4	Mo Tae-bum	(South Korea)	80	80	5	70	32	80	80	100					527
5	Artyom Kuznetsov	(Russia)	50	14	36	14	100	70	50	32	21	60	8	16	471
6	Gilmore Junio	(Canada)	15	19	100	18					80	45	105	75	457
7	Jesper Hospes	(Netherlands)	45	45	18	28	36	40	40	50	24	40	40	36	442
8	Tucker Fredricks	(United States)	25	100	50	8	45	50	36	40	36	28	16	6	440
9	Dmitry Lobkov	(Russia)	32	18	28	10	80	36	60	36	32	32	36	28	428
10	Nico Ihle	(Germany)	4			19	14	12	18	28	70	80	90	90	425
11	Keiichiro Nagashima	(Japan)	19	4	16	100	45	100	70	60					414
12	Joji Kato	(Japan)	10	40	100	21	50	60	45	80					406
13	Mitchell Whitmore	(United States)	36	50	60	40	28	14	21	24	6	14	24	14	331
14	Jamie Gregg	(Canada)	70	70	40	50					12	6	10	32	290
15	Yūya Oikawa	(Japan)	18	24	32	45	16	18	28	6	28	50	18	5	288
16	Artur Waś	(Poland)	12	5		6			19	4		25	90	45	206
17	Ryohei Haga	(Japan)	24	28	8	16	24	21	24	21	10	5	14	8	203
18	Daniel Greig	(Australia)	8	6	11		12	24	32	12	14	16	21	40	196
19	Aleksey Yesin	(Russia)				25	8	10	15	19	40	24	28	24	193
20	Mirko Giacomo Nenzi	(Italy)	1	8			25	16	14	18	45	8	32	18	185
21	Pekka Koskela	(Finland)	16	16	21	5			16	45	8	18	5	10	160
22	Mika Poutala	(Finland)	21	21	12	32	18	6	10	16					136
23	William Dutton	(Canada)	14				8	15	25	5	18	12	12	21	130
24	Espen Aarnes Hvammen	(Norway)	6	11	1					25	16	21			80
25	Lee Kang-seok	(South Korea)	28	12	14	4	10		6						74
26	Sung Ching-Yang	(Chinese Taipei)		2	25	24			12	10					73
27	Laurent Dubreuil	(Canada)	8	15	10	36									69
28	Denis Koval	(Russia)		25	6	6	5	5	6	15					68
29	Denny Ihle	(Germany)			8	11	6	8	1	8	15	8			65
30	Kim Jun-ho	(South Korea)		6		1	19	8	8	14					56
31	David Bosa	(Italy)									25	10	6	12	53
32	Roman Krech	(Kazakhstan)					11	25	5	8					49
33	Akio Ohta	(Japan)	6	8	2			19	4	6					45
34	Hein Otterspeer	(Netherlands)							11	11		19			41
35	Alex Boisvert-Lacroix	(Canada)			19	15									34
36	Artur Nogal	(Poland)						11		1	11	11			34
37	Jonathan Garcia	(United States)					4	6	8			15			33
38	Igor Bogolubsky	(Russia)		1							19	6			26
39	Kjeld Nuis	(Netherlands)	5	10		8									23
40	Bai Quiming	(China)			15	2									17
41	Stefan Groothuis	(Netherlands)					15								15
42	Samuel Schwarz	(Germany)	11												11
43	Mu Zhongsheng	(China)	2		4		1		2	2					11
44	Dennis Dressel	(Germany)									8	2			10
45	Lee Kyou-hyuk	(South Korea)					6								6
45	Fyodor Mezentsev	(Kazakhstan)									6				6
45	Alexandre St-Jean	(Canada)			6										6
48	Tyler Derraugh	(Canada)					2	4							6
49	Brian Hansen	(United States)				4									4
49	Håvard Holmefjord Lorentzen	(Norway)										4			4
49	Simon Moor	(Germany)									4				4
52	Tommi Pulli	(Finland)									2	1			3
53	Christoffer Fagerli Rukke	(Norway)						2							2
54	Kim Tae-yun	(South Korea)						1							1
54	Joel Vähä-Salo	(Finland)									1				1
