= 2013–14 ISU Speed Skating World Cup – World Cup 1 – Men's 500 metres =

The men's 500 metres races of the 2013–14 ISU Speed Skating World Cup 1, arranged in the Olympic Oval, in Calgary, Alberta, Canada, were held on 8 and 10 November 2013.

Race one was won by Ronald Mulder of the Netherlands, while Mo Tae-bum of South Korea came second, and Jamie Gregg of Canada came third.

Tucker Fredricks of the United States won Division B of race one, and was thus, under the rules, automatically promoted to Division A for race two. He then went on to win race two, with Mo again finishing second, and Mulder and Gregg sharing third place. Denis Koval of Russia won Division B of race two.

== Race 1 ==
Race one took place on Friday, 8 November, with Division A scheduled in the morning session, at 11:25, and Division B scheduled in the afternoon session, at 14:55.

=== Division A ===
Rank	Name	Nat.	Pair	Lane	Time	WC points	GWC points
1st place, gold medalist(s)	Ronald Mulder	(Netherlands)	10	o	34.41	100	5
2nd place, silver medalist(s)	Mo Tae-bum	(South Korea)	8	i	34.523	80	4
3rd place, bronze medalist(s)	Jamie Gregg	(Canada)	8	o	34.526	70	3.5
4	Michel Mulder	(Netherlands)	9	o	34.56	60	3
5	Artyom Kuznetsov	(Russia)	6	o	34.60	50	2.5
6	Jesper Hospes	(Netherlands)	4	o	34.671	45	—
7	Jan Smeekens	(Netherlands)	9	i	34.677	40	
8	Mitchell Whitmore	(United States)	3	o	34.681	36	
9	Dmitry Lobkov	(Russia)	2	i	34.682	32	
10	Lee Kang-seok	(South Korea)	3	i	34.84	28	
11	Ryohei Haga	(Japan)	6	i	34.862	24	
12	Mika Poutala	(Finland)	5	o	34.868	21	
13	Yūya Oikawa	(Japan)	7	i	34.90	18	
14	Pekka Koskela	(Finland)	4	i	34.91	16	
15	William Dutton	(Canada)	7	o	34.92	14	
16	Artur Waś	(Poland)	5	i	34.93	12	
17	Joji Kato	(Japan)	10	i	34.96	10	
18	Daniel Greig	(Australia)	1	o	35.11	8	
19	Akio Ohta	(Japan)	2	o	35.55	6	
20	Kjeld Nuis	(Netherlands)	1	i	37.16	5	

=== Division B ===
Rank	Name	Nat.	Pair	Lane	Time	WC points
1	Tucker Fredricks	(United States)	10	i	34.411	25
2	Keiichiro Nagashima	(Japan)	9	o	34.412	19
3	Gilmore Junio	(Canada)	16	o	34.58	15
4	Samuel Schwarz	(Germany)	13	i	34.71	11
5	Laurent Dubreuil	(Canada)	17	o	34.77	8
6	Espen Aarnes Hvammen	(Norway)	8	i	34.90	6
7	Nico Ihle	(Germany)	17	i	34.91	4
8	Mu Zhongsheng	(China)	10	o	35.00	2
9	Mirko Giacomo Nenzi	(Italy)	13	o	35.01	1
10	Kim Jun-ho	(South Korea)	12	o	35.02	—
11	Alexandre St-Jean	(Canada)	12	i	35.03	
12	Sung Ching-Yang	(Chinese Taipei)	9	i	35.05	
13	Lee Kyou-hyuk	(South Korea)	15	o	35.13	
14	Denny Ihle	(Germany)	11	o	35.22	
15	Igor Bogolubsky	(Russia)	11	i	35.23	
16	Denis Koval	(Russia)	16	i	35.25	
17	Bai Qiuming	(China)	14	o	35.37	
18	Fyodor Mezentsev	(Kazakhstan)	6	i	35.40	
19	Kim Tae-yun	(South Korea)	15	i	35.448	
20	Shani Davis	(United States)	7	i	35.449	
21	Christoffer Fagerli Rukke	(Norway)	14	i	35.45	
22	Mikhail Kozlov	(Russia)	8	o	35.46	
23	Håvard Holmefjord Lorentzen	(Norway)	4	o	35.49	
24	Artur Nogal	(Poland)	3	i	35.634	
24	Marius Christian Paraschivoiu	(Romania)	5	i	35.634	
26	Ben Southee	(Australia)	2	o	35.72	
27	Jonathan Garcia	(United States)	1	o	35.74	
28	Benjamin Macé	(France)	7	o	35.78	
29	Markus Puolakka	(Finland)	4	i	35.80	
30	Joey Mantia	(United States)	5	o	35.83	
31	Denis Dressel	(Germany)	3	o	35.84	
32	David Bosa	(Italy)	1	i	35.85	
33	Maciej Biega	(Poland)	6	o	35.92	
34	Li Xuefeng	(China)	2	i	36.42	

== Race 2 ==
Race two took place on Sunday, 10 November, with Division A scheduled in the morning session, at 11:00, and Division B scheduled in the afternoon session, at 15:20.

=== Division A ===
Rank	Name	Nat.	Pair	Lane	Time	WC points	GWC points
1st place, gold medalist(s)	Tucker Fredricks	(United States)	10	o	34.46	100	5
2nd place, silver medalist(s)	Mo Tae-bum	(South Korea)	9	o	34.47	80	4
3rd place, bronze medalist(s)	Ronald Mulder	(Netherlands)	10	i	34.529	70	3.5
3rd place, bronze medalist(s)	Jamie Gregg	(Canada)	9	i	34.529	70	3.5
5	Mitchell Whitmore	(United States)	5	i	34.56	50	2.5
6	Jesper Hospes	(Netherlands)	6	i	34.57	45	—
7	Joji Kato	(Japan)	1	i	34.618	40	
7	Jan Smeekens	(Netherlands)	8	o	34.618	40	
9	Michel Mulder	(Netherlands)	8	i	34.68	32	
10	Ryohei Haga	(Japan)	5	o	34.723	28	
11	Yūya Oikawa	(Japan)	4	o	34.729	24	
12	Mika Poutala	(Finland)	4	i	34.74	21	
13	Dmitry Lobkov	(Russia)	7	o	34.81	18	
14	Pekka Koskela	(Finland)	3	o	34.87	16	
15	Artyom Kuznetsov	(Russia)	7	i	34.90	14	
16	Lee Kang-seok	(South Korea)	6	o	34.92	12	
17	Kjeld Nuis	(Netherlands)	1	o	34.93	10	
18	Akio Ohta	(Japan)	2	i	35.02	8	
19	Daniel Greig	(Australia)	3	i	35.04	6	
20	Artur Waś	(Poland)	2	o	35.72	5	

=== Division B ===
Rank	Name	Nat.	Pair	Lane	Time	WC points
1	Denis Koval	(Russia)	11	o	34.47	25
2	Gilmore Junio	(Canada)	16	i	34.67	19
3	Laurent Dubreuil	(Canada)	15	i	34.75	15
4	Espen Aarnes Hvammen	(Norway)	16	o	34.82	11
5	Mirko Giacomo Nenzi	(Italy)	13	i	34.89	8
6	Kim Jun-ho	(South Korea)	12	i	34.91	6
7	Keiichiro Nagashima	(Japan)	17	i	34.923	4
8	Sung Ching-Yang	(Chinese Taipei)	13	o	34.925	2
9	Igor Bogolubsky	(Russia)	12	o	34.928	1
10	Alexandre St-Jean	(Canada)	14	o	34.99	—
11	Lee Kyou-hyuk	(South Korea)	11	i	35.03	
12	Denny Ihle	(Germany)	10	i	35.05	
13	Aleksey Yesin	(Russia)	2	o	35.06	
14	Alex Boisvert-Lacroix	(Canada)	4	o	35.15	
15	Mu Zhongsheng	(China)	14	i	35.193	
16	Nico Ihle	(Germany)	15	o	35.194	
17	Denis Kuzin	(Kazakhstan)	1	i	35.22	
18	Brian Hansen	(United States)	3	o	35.35	
19	Samuel Schwarz	(Germany)	17	o	35.38	
20	Kim Tae-yun	(South Korea)	10	o	35.42	
21	Jonathan Garcia	(United States)	6	i	35.49	
22	Christoffer Fagerli Rukke	(Norway)	9	o	35.53	
23	Marius Christian Paraschivoiu	(Romania)	8	o	35.56	
24	Bai Qiuming	(China)	9	i	35.575	
25	David Bosa	(Italy)	6	o	35.577	
26	Joey Mantia	(United States)	5	i	35.62	
27	Håvard Holmefjord Lorentzen	(Norway)	8	i	35.65	
28	Konrad Niedźwiedzki	(Poland)	2	i	35.66	
29	Ben Southee	(Australia)	7	i	35.69	
30	Denis Dressel	(Germany)	4	i	35.72	
31	Markus Puolakka	(Finland)	7	o	35.79	
32	Maciej Biega	(Poland)	3	i	35.84	
33	Li Xuefeng	(China)	5	o	36.07	
