= 2013–14 ISU Speed Skating World Cup – World Cup 2 – Men's 500 metres =

The men's 500 metres races of the 2013–14 ISU Speed Skating World Cup 2, arranged in the Utah Olympic Oval, in Salt Lake City, United States, were held on November 15 and 17, 2013.

In race one, Gilmore Junio of Canada and Joji Kato of Japan shared the first place, while Michel Mulder of the Netherlands came third. Sung Ching-Yang of Chinese Taipei won the Division B race.

In race two, Keiichiro Nagashima of Japan won, while Ronald Mulder of the Netherlands came second, and Mo Tae-bum of South Korea came third. Aleksey Yesin of Russia won the Division B race.

== Race 1 ==
Race one took place on Friday, November 15, with Division B scheduled in the morning session, at 12:24, and Division A scheduled in the afternoon session, at 14:29.

=== Division A ===
Rank	Name	Nat.	Pair	Lane	Time	WC points	GWC points
1st place, gold medalist(s)	Gilmore Junio	(Canada)	3	o	34.258	100	5
1st place, gold medalist(s)	Joji Kato	(Japan)	5	i	34.258	100	5
3rd place, bronze medalist(s)	Michel Mulder	(Netherlands)	8	i	34.26	70	3.5
4	Mitchell Whitmore	(United States)	7	i	34.29	60	3
5	Tucker Fredricks	(United States)	9	o	34.30	50	2.5
6	Jan Smeekens	(Netherlands)	7	o	34.36	45	—
7	Jamie Gregg	(Canada)	9	i	34.37	40	
8	Artyom Kuznetsov	(Russia)	6	i	34.46	36	
9	Yūya Oikawa	(Japan)	4	i	34.49	32	
10	Dmitry Lobkov	(Russia)	5	o	34.52	28	
11	Ronald Mulder	(Netherlands)	10	i	34.54	24	
12	Pekka Koskela	(Finland)	2	i	34.55	21	
13	Jesper Hospes	(Netherlands)	8	o	34.56	18	
14	Keiichiro Nagashima	(Japan)	1	i	34.66	16	
15	Lee Kang-seok	(South Korea)	3	i	34.67	14	
16	Mika Poutala	(Finland)	4	o	34.69	12	
17	Laurent Dubreuil	(Canada)	1	o	34.72	10	
18	Ryohei Haga	(Japan)	6	o	34.84	8	
19	Denis Koval	(Russia)	2	o	35.12	6	
20	Mo Tae-bum	(South Korea)	10	o	1:10.95	5	

=== Division B ===
Rank	Name	Nat.	Pair	Lane	Time	WC points
1	Sung Ching-Yang	(Chinese Taipei)	13	i	34.64	25
2	Alex Boisvert-Lacroix	(Canada)	10	i	34.78	19
3	Bai Qiuming	(China)	10	o	34.79	15
4	Daniel Greig	(Australia)	16	o	34.82	11
5	Denny Ihle	(Germany)	11	o	34.842	8
6	Alexandre St-Jean	(Canada)	12	o	34.849	6
7	Mu Zhongsheng	(China)	13	o	34.92	4
8	Akio Ohta	(Japan)	16	i	34.94	2
9	Espen Aarnes Hvammen	(Norway)	17	o	34.96	1
10	Artur Waś	(Poland)	17	i	34.97	—
11	Stefan Groothuis	(Netherlands)	2	i	34.99	
12	Mirko Giacomo Nenzi	(Italy)	15	o	35.02	
13	Nico Ihle	(Germany)	14	o	35.06	
14	Christoffer Fagerli Rukke	(Norway)	8	i	35.10	
15	Igor Bogolubsky	(Russia)	12	i	35.11	
16	Jonathan Garcia	(United States)	7	i	35.14	
17	Kim Tae-yun	(South Korea)	9	o	35.19	
18	Kim Jun-ho	(South Korea)	14	i	35.22	
19	David Bosa	(Italy)	6	i	35.28	
20	Artur Nogal	(Poland)	5	i	35.29	
21	Fyodor Mezentsev	(Kazakhstan)	9	i	35.33	
22	Mikhail Kozlov	(Russia)	8	o	35.42	
23	Haralds Silovs	(Latvia)	2	o	35.46	
24	Benjamin Macé	(France)	4	o	35.47	
25	Denis Dressel	(Germany)	4	i	35.49	
26	Maciej Biega	(Poland)	3	i	35.55	
27	Ben Southee	(Australia)	5	o	35.59	
28	Li Xuefeng	(China)	3	o	35.68	
29	Joey Mantia	(United States)	6	o	35.71	
30	Tommi Pulli	(Finland)	1	i	35.81	
31	Lee Kyou-hyuk	(South Korea)	11	i	35.84	
32	Marius Christian Paraschivoiu	(Romania)	7	o	35.86	
33	Samuel Schwarz	(Germany)	15	i	55.23	

== Race 2 ==
Race two took place on Sunday, November 17, with Division B scheduled in the morning session, at 11:47, and Division A scheduled in the afternoon session, at 13:32.

=== Division A ===
Rank	Name	Nat.	Pair	Lane	Time	WC points	GWC points
1st place, gold medalist(s)	Keiichiro Nagashima	(Japan)	2	o	34.24	100	5
2nd place, silver medalist(s)	Ronald Mulder	(Netherlands)	5	o	34.25	80	4
3rd place, bronze medalist(s)	Mo Tae-bum	(South Korea)	2	i	34.28	70	3.5
4	Michel Mulder	(Netherlands)	10	o	34.41	60	3
5	Jamie Gregg	(Canada)	8	o	34.46	50	2.5
6	Yūya Oikawa	(Japan)	6	o	34.49	45	—
7	Mitchell Whitmore	(United States)	9	o	34.52	40	
8	Laurent Dubreuil	(Canada)	5	i	34.62	36	
9	Mika Poutala	(Finland)	6	i	34.631	32	
10	Jesper Hospes	(Netherlands)	7	i	34.638	28	
11	Sung Ching-Yang	(Chinese Taipei)	3	o	34.643	24	
12	Joji Kato	(Japan)	11	o	34.646	21	
13	Gilmore Junio	(Canada)	11	i	34.647	18	
14	Ryohei Haga	(Japan)	4	i	34.67	16	
15	Artyom Kuznetsov	(Russia)	7	o	34.682	14	
16	Jan Smeekens	(Netherlands)	9	i	34.683	12	
17	Dmitry Lobkov	(Russia)	8	i	34.72	10	
18	Tucker Fredricks	(United States)	10	i	34.73	8	
19	Denis Koval	(Russia)	3	i	34.77	6	
20	Pekka Koskela	(Finland)	4	o	34.85	5	
21	Lee Kang-seok	(South Korea)	1	o	35.01	4	

=== Division B ===
Rank	Name	Nat.	Pair	Lane	Time	WC points
1	Aleksey Yesin	(Russia)	3	o	34.82	25
2	Nico Ihle	(Germany)	9	i	34.84	19
3	Alex Boisvert-Lacroix	(Canada)	16	o	34.86	15
4	Denny Ihle	(Germany)	14	i	34.90	11
5	Kjeld Nuis	(Netherlands)	4	o	34.95	8
6	Artur Waś	(Poland)	14	o	34.96	6
7	Brian Hansen	(United States)	2	i	34.987	4
8	Bai Quiming	(China)	16	i	34.989	2
9	Kim Jun-ho	(South Korea)	10	o	35.03	1
10	Akio Ohta	(Japan)	15	o	35.041	—
10	Alexandre St-Jean	(Canada)	13	i	35.041	
12	Espen Aarnes Hvammen	(Norway)	11	i	35.09	
13	Kim Tae-yun	(South Korea)	8	i	35.111	
14	Mu Zhongsheng	(China)	12	i	35.117	
15	Daniel Greig	(Australia)	15	i	35.20	
16	Artur Nogal	(Poland)	8	o	35.21	
17	David Bosa	(Italy)	9	o	35.31	
18	Mirko Giacomo Nenzi	(Italy)	10	i	35.35	
19	Joey Mantia	(United States)	4	i	35.44	
20	Christoffer Fagerli Rukke	(Norway)	13	o	35.45	
21	Jonathan Garcia	(United States)	11	o	35.53	
22	Fyodor Mezentsev	(Kazakhstan)	7	o	35.54	
23	Markus Puolakka	(Finland)	1	i	35.56	
24	Denis Dressel	(Germany)	6	o	35.596	
24	Håvard Holmefjord Lorentzen	(Norway)	2	o	35.596	
26	Igor Bogolubsky	(Russia)	12	o	35.599	
27	Ben Southee	(Australia)	6	i	35.62	
28	Maciej Biega	(Poland)	5	o	35.66	
29	Haralds Silovs	(Latvia)	7	i	35.70	
30	Marius Christian Paraschivoiu	(Romania)	3	i	35.94	
31	Li Xuefeng	(China)	5	i	35.99	
