= 2013–14 ISU Speed Skating World Cup – World Cup 3 – Men's 500 metres =

The men's 500 metres races of the 2013–14 ISU Speed Skating World Cup 3, arranged in the Alau Ice Palace, in Astana, Kazakhstan, were held on 30 November and 1 December 2013.

Artyom Kuznetsov of Russia won race one, while his compatriot Dmitry Lobkov came second, and Ronald Mulder of the Netherlands came third. Mirko Giacomo Nenzi of Italy won the Division B race.

Keiichiro Nagashima of Japan won race two, while Mo Tae-bum of South Korea came second, and Artyom Kuznetsov added a bronze medal to his gold from race one. Roman Krech of Kazakhstan won the second Division B race.

== Race 1 ==
Race one took place on Saturday, 30 November, with Division B scheduled in the afternoon session, at 13:50, and Division A scheduled in the evening session, at 17:55.

=== Division A ===
Rank	Name	Nat.	Pair	Lane	Time	WC points	GWC points
1st place, gold medalist(s)	Artyom Kuznetsov	(Russia)	5	i	34.85	100	5
2nd place, silver medalist(s)	Dmitry Lobkov	(Russia)	5	o	34.86	80	4
3rd place, bronze medalist(s)	Ronald Mulder	(Netherlands)	10	i	34.87	70	3.5
4	Jan Smeekens	(Netherlands)	7	o	34.97	60	3
5	Joji Kato	(Japan)	8	o	34.98	50	2.5
6	Tucker Fredricks	(United States)	8	i	35.028	45	—
6	Keiichiro Nagashima	(Japan)	7	i	35.028	45	
8	Jesper Hospes	(Netherlands)	6	i	35.095	36	
9	Mo Tae-bum	(South Korea)	10	o	35.097	32	
10	Mitchell Whitmore	(United States)	9	o	35.11	28	
11	Ryohei Haga	(Japan)	4	o	35.14	24	
12	Michel Mulder	(Netherlands)	9	i	35.187	21	
13	Mika Poutala	(Finland)	4	i	35.188	18	
14	Yūya Oikawa	(Japan)	6	o	35.19	16	
15	Nico Ihle	(Germany)	1	i	35.32	14	
16	Daniel Greig	(Australia)	2	o	35.39	12	
17	Lee Kang-seok	(South Korea)	3	i	35.46	10	
18	Aleksey Yesin	(Russia)	2	i	35.53	8	
19	Denny Ihle	(Germany)	1	o	35.61	6	
20	Denis Koval	(Russia)	3	o	35.87	5	

=== Division B ===
Rank	Name	Nat.	Pair	Lane	Time	WC points
1	Mirko Giacomo Nenzi	(Italy)	10	i	35.33	25
2	Kim Jun-ho	(South Korea)	10	o	35.40	19
3	Stefan Groothuis	(Netherlands)	9	o	35.52	15
4	Roman Krech	(Kazakhstan)	1	i	35.54	11
5	William Dutton	(Canada)	11	o	35.58	8
6	Lee Kyou-hyuk	(South Korea)	8	i	35.59	6
7	Jonathan Garcia	(United States)	7	o	35.64	4
8	Tyler Derraugh	(Canada)	2	i	35.66	2
9	Mu Zhongsheng	(China)	9	i	35.69	1
10	Akio Ohta	(Japan)	11	i	35.76	—
11	Shani Davis	(United States)	5	i	35.78	
12	Artur Nogal	(Poland)	6	i	35.83	
13	Kim Tae-yun	(South Korea)	7	i	35.872	
14	Joey Mantia	(United States)	6	o	35.877	
15	Markus Puolakka	(Finland)	4	o	35.94	
16	Christoffer Fagerli Rukke	(Norway)	8	o	35.98	
17	Denny Morrison	(Canada)	2	o	35.99	
18	Maciej Biega	(Poland)	4	i	36.10	
19	Denis Dressel	(Germany)	5	o	36.247	
19	Li Xuefeng	(China)	3	i	36.247	
21	Tommi Pulli	(Finland)	3	o	36.39	

== Race 2 ==
Race two took place on Sunday, 1 December, with Division B scheduled in the morning session, at 09:30, and Division A scheduled in the afternoon session, from 15:00.

=== Division A ===
Rank	Name	Nat.	Pair	Lane	Time	WC points	GWC points
1st place, gold medalist(s)	Keiichiro Nagashima	(Japan)	7	o	34.69	100	5
2nd place, silver medalist(s)	Mo Tae-bum	(South Korea)	7	i	34.87	80	4
3rd place, bronze medalist(s)	Artyom Kuznetsov	(Russia)	10	o	34.92	70	3.5
4	Joji Kato	(Japan)	8	i	34.97	60	3
5	Tucker Fredricks	(United States)	8	o	35.00	50	2.5
6	Michel Mulder	(Netherlands)	5	o	35.01	45	—
7	Jesper Hospes	(Netherlands)	6	o	35.03	40	
8	Dmitry Lobkov	(Russia)	10	i	35.04	36	
9	Ronald Mulder	(Netherlands)	9	o	35.11	32	
10	Jan Smeekens	(Netherlands)	9	i	35.13	28	
11	Daniel Greig	(Australia)	3	i	35.16	24	
12	Ryohei Haga	(Japan)	5	i	35.24	21	
13	Yūya Oikawa	(Japan)	4	i	35.27	18	
14	Mirko Giacomo Nenzi	(Italy)	2	o	35.29	16	
15	Mitchell Whitmore	(United States)	6	i	35.33	14	
16	Nico Ihle	(Germany)	3	o	35.37	12	
17	Aleksey Yesin	(Russia)	1	o	35.40	10	
18	Denny Ihle	(Germany)	2	i	35.50	8	
19	Mika Poutala	(Finland)	4	o	35.65	6	
20	Denis Koval	(Russia)	1	i	35.88	5	

=== Division B ===
Rank	Name	Nat.	Pair	Lane	Time	WC points
1	Roman Krech	(Kazakhstan)	10	o	35.38	25
2	Akio Ohta	(Japan)	6	o	35.45	19
3	William Dutton	(Canada)	9	i	35.46	15
4	Artur Nogal	(Poland)	5	o	35.48	11
5	Kim Jun-ho	(South Korea)	10	i	35.61	8
6	Jonathan Garcia	(United States)	8	i	35.64	6
7	Tyler Derraugh	(Canada)	8	o	35.73	4
8	Christoffer Fagerli Rukke	(Norway)	5	i	35.832	2
9	Kim Tae-yun	(South Korea)	4	o	35.836	1
10	Markus Puolakka	(Finland)	6	i	35.849	—
11	Mu Zhongsheng	(China)	7	o	35.86	
12	Joey Mantia	(United States)	7	i	35.97	
13	Lee Kyou-hyuk	(South Korea)	9	o	36.03	
14	Håvard Holmefjord Lorentzen	(Norway)	2	i	36.19	
15	Denis Dressel	(Germany)	4	i	36.24	
16	Yevgeny Lalenkov	(Russia)	1	o	36.32	
17	Li Xuefeng	(China)	2	o	36.34	
19	Jan Daldossi	(Italy)	1	i	37.24	
18	Maciej Biega	(Poland)	3	o	36.60	
20	Tommi Pulli	(Finland)	3	i	DQ	
