= 2013–14 ISU Speed Skating World Cup – World Cup 4 – Men's 1000 metres =

The men's 1000 metres race of the 2013–14 ISU Speed Skating World Cup 4, arranged in Sportforum Hohenschönhausen, in Berlin, Germany, was held on 7 December 2013.

Mo Tae-bum of South Korea won the race, followed by Michel Mulder of the Netherlands in second place, and Shani Davis of the United States in third place. Thomas Krol of the Netherlands won the Division B race.

== Results ==
The race took place on Saturday, 7 December, with Division B scheduled in the morning session, at 09:54, and Division A scheduled in the afternoon session, at 13:41.

=== Division A ===
Rank	Name	Nat.	Pair	Lane	Time	WC points	GWC points
1st place, gold medalist(s)	Mo Tae-bum	(South Korea)	7	i	1:09.50	100	10
2nd place, silver medalist(s)	Michel Mulder	(Netherlands)	10	o	1:09.52	80	8
3rd place, bronze medalist(s)	Shani Davis	(United States)	10	i	1:09.59	70	7
4	Håvard Holmefjord Lorentzen	(Norway)	7	o	1:09.94	60	6
5	Denis Kuzin	(Kazakhstan)	9	o	1:09.97	50	5
6	Joey Mantia	(United States)	3	o	1:09.98	45	—
7	Samuel Schwarz	(Germany)	5	o	1:10.08	40	
8	Nico Ihle	(Germany)	2	o	1:10.10	36	
9	Aleksey Yesin	(Russia)	6	i	1:10.10	32	
10	Sjoerd de Vries	(Netherlands)	6	o	1:10.14	28	
11	Mirko Giacomo Nenzi	(Italy)	8	i	1:10.15	24	
12	Jonathan Garcia	(United States)	2	i	1:10.19	21	
13	Hein Otterspeer	(Netherlands)	1	o	1:10.24	18	
14	Dmitry Lobkov	(Russia)	5	i	1:10.33	16	
15	William Dutton	(Canada)	1	i	1:10.34	14	
16	Haralds Silovs	(Latvia)	3	i	1:10.39	12	
17	Mitchell Whitmore	(United States)	8	o	1:10.44	10	
18	Daniel Greig	(Australia)	4	i	1:10.47	8	
19	Trevor Marsicano	(United States)	4	o	1:10.53	6	
20	Denny Morrison	(Canada)	9	i	1:10.80	5	

=== Division B ===
Rank	Name	Nat.	Pair	Lane	Time	WC points
1	Thomas Krol	(Netherlands)	3	o	1:09.88	25
2	Keiichiro Nagashima	(Japan)	3	i	1:10.13	19
3	Lennart Velema	(Netherlands)	2	i	1:10.38	15
4	Tian Guojun	(China)	12	i	1:10.81	11
5	Fyodor Mezentsev	(Kazakhstan)	11	i	1:11.13	8
6	Benjamin Macé	(France)	11	o	1:11.22	6
7	Bart Swings	(Belgium)	7	i	1:11.61	4
8	Lee Kyou-hyuk	(South Korea)	13	i	1:11.68	2
9	Maciej Biega	(Poland)	1	i	1:11.72	1
10	Daichi Yamanaka	(Japan)	10	i	1:11.76	—
11	Roman Krech	(Kazakhstan)	12	o	1:12.04	
12	Mu Zhongsheng	(China)	2	o	1:12.21	
13	Taro Kondo	(Japan)	7	o	1:12.45	
14	Igor Bogolubsky	(Russia)	9	i	1:12.46	
15	Tommi Pulli	(Finland)	6	i	1:12.55	
16	Darren Ta-Yuan Huang	(Chinese Taipei)	4	o	1:12.58	
17	Jan Daldossi	(Italy)	8	o	1:12.60	
18	Hubert Hirschbichler	(Germany)	5	o	1:12.74	
19	Espen Tveit	(Norway)	1	o	1:12.79	
20	Kim Tae-yun	(South Korea)	13	o	1:12.89	
21	Artyom Kuznetsov	(Russia)	10	o	1:13.04	
22	David Andersson	(Sweden)	8	i	1:13.08	
23	Armin Hager	(Austria)	6	o	1:13.09	
24	Darsil Essamambo	(Kazakhstan)	4	i	1:13.48	
25	Mark Jackson	(New Zealand)	5	i	1:13.89	
26	Denis Koval	(Russia)	9	o	DQ	
