= 2013–14 ISU Speed Skating World Cup – World Cup 5 – Men's 500 metres =

The men's 500 metres races of the 2013–14 ISU Speed Skating World Cup 5, arranged in Eisstadion Inzell, in Inzell, Germany, was held on 8 and 9 March 2014.

Ronald Mulder of the Netherlands won the race on Saturday, while Gilmore Junio of Canada came second, and Nico Ihle of Germany came third. David Bosa of Italy won the Division B race.

Jan Smeekens of the Netherlands won the Sunday race, while Nico Ihle of Germany came second, and Michel Mulder of the Netherlands came third. Artur Waś of Poland won the second Division B race.

== Race 1 ==
Race one took place on Saturday, 8 March, with Division B scheduled in the morning session, at 10:10, and Division A scheduled in the afternoon session, at 13:59.

=== Division A ===
Rank	Name	Nat.	Pair	Lane	Time	WC points	GWC points
1st place, gold medalist(s)	Ronald Mulder	(Netherlands)	10	o	34.96	100	5
2nd place, silver medalist(s)	Gilmore Junio	(Canada)	5	o	35.02	80	4
3rd place, bronze medalist(s)	Nico Ihle	(Germany)	3	i	35.10	70	3.5
4	Jan Smeekens	(Netherlands)	6	i	35.16	60	3
5	Michel Mulder	(Netherlands)	10	i	35.17	50	2.5
6	Mirko Giacomo Nenzi	(Italy)	3	o	35.22	45	—
7	Aleksey Yesin	(Russia)	2	i	35.24	40	
8	Tucker Fredricks	(United States)	9	o	35.274	36	
9	Dmitry Lobkov	(Russia)	8	o	35.275	32	
10	Yūya Oikawa	(Japan)	6	o	35.30	28	
11	Jesper Hospes	(Netherlands)	8	i	35.36	24	
12	Artyom Kuznetsov	(Russia)	9	i	35.442	21	
13	William Dutton	(Canada)	2	o	35.447	18	
14	Espen Aarnes Hvammen	(Norway)	1	i	35.45	16	
15	Daniel Greig	(Australia)	4	o	35.49	14	
16	Jamie Gregg	(Canada)	7	o	35.58	12	
17	Ryohei Haga	(Japan)	5	i	35.93	10	
18	Pekka Koskela	(Finland)	4	i	57.29	8	
19	Mitchell Whitmore	(United States)	7	i	1:34.68	6	

=== Division B ===
Rank	Name	Nat.	Pair	Lane	Time	WC points
1	David Bosa	(Italy)	4	o	35.57	25
2	Igor Bogolubsky	(Russia)	4	i	36.00	19
3	Denny Ihle	(Germany)	6	o	36.01	15
4	Artur Nogal	(Poland)	5	o	36.14	11
5	Denis Dressel	(Germany)	3	o	36.35	8
6	Fyodor Mezentsev	(Kazakhstan)	3	i	36.36	6
7	Simon Moor	(Germany)	1	i	36.52	4
8	Tommi Pulli	(Finland)	2	i	37.10	2
9	Joel Vähä-Salo	(Finland)	2	o	37.48	1
10	Hein Otterspeer	(Netherlands)	5	i	DNF	—
11	Artur Waś	(Poland)	6	i	DQ	

== Race 2 ==
Race two took place on Sunday, 9 March, with Division B scheduled in the morning session, at 10:30, and Division A scheduled in the afternoon session, at 13:30.

=== Division A ===
Rank	Name	Nat.	Pair	Lane	Time	WC points	GWC points
1st place, gold medalist(s)	Jan Smeekens	(Netherlands)	9	o	34.91	100	5
2nd place, silver medalist(s)	Nico Ihle	(Germany)	10	o	34.97	80	4
3rd place, bronze medalist(s)	Michel Mulder	(Netherlands)	8	o	35.00	70	3.5
4	Artyom Kuznetsov	(Russia)	5	o	35.04	60	3
5	Yūya Oikawa	(Japan)	5	i	35.05	50	2.5
6	Gilmore Junio	(Canada)	9	i	35.095	45	—
7	Jesper Hospes	(Netherlands)	6	o	35.096	40	
8	Ronald Mulder	(Netherlands)	10	i	35.18	36	
9	Dmitry Lobkov	(Russia)	6	i	35.20	32	
10	Tucker Fredricks	(United States)	7	i	35.21	28	
11	Aleksey Yesin	(Russia)	7	o	35.24	24	
12	Espen Aarnes Hvammen	(Norway)	4	o	35.32	21	
13	Pekka Koskela	(Finland)	2	o	35.344	18	
14	Daniel Greig	(Australia)	3	i	35.346	16	
15	Mitchell Whitmore	(United States)	1	o	35.36	14	
16	William Dutton	(Canada)	4	i	35.52	12	
17	David Bosa	(Italy)	2	i	35.57	10	
18	Mirko Giacomo Nenzi	(Italy)	8	i	35.63	8	
19	Jamie Gregg	(Canada)	1	i	35.66	6	
20	Ryohei Haga	(Japan)	3	o	35.83	5	

=== Division B ===
Rank	Name	Nat.	Pair	Lane	Time	WC points
1	Artur Waś	(Poland)	2	o	35.27	25
2	Hein Otterspeer	(Netherlands)	3	o	35.43	19
3	Jonathan Garcia	(United States)	2	i	35.96	15
4	Artur Nogal	(Poland)	5	i	35.99	11
5	Denny Ihle	(Germany)	6	i	36.00	8
6	Igor Bogolubsky	(Russia)	6	o	36.14	6
7	Håvard Holmefjord Lorentzen	(Norway)	1	o	36.37	4
8	Denis Dressel	(Germany)	4	i	36.452	2
9	Tommi Pulli	(Finland)	4	o	36.458	1
10	Simon Moor	(Germany)	5	o	36.52	—
11	Joey Mantia	(United States)	1	i	36.94	
12	Joel Vähä-Salo	(Finland)	3	i	36.96	
