= 2013 World Single Distance Speed Skating Championships – Men's 500 metres =

Men's 500 metres at the 2013 World Single Distance Speed Skating Championships
- Venue: Adler Arena, Sochi
- Date: 24 March 2013
- Competitors: 24 from 12 nations
- Winning time: 69.760

Medalists
gold medal	Mo Tae-bum	South Korea
silver medal	Joji Kato	Japan
bronze medal	Jan Smeekens	Netherlands

The men's 500 metres race of the 2013 World Single Distance Speed Skating Championships was held on 24 March at 15:44 and 17:17 local time.

== Results ==
Rank	Name	Country	Pair	Lane	Race 1	Pair	Lane	Race 2	Total	Diff
1st place, gold medalist(s)	Mo Tae-bum	South Korea	10	i	34.94 (3)	12	o	34.82 (1)	69.760	
2nd place, silver medalist(s)	Joji Kato	Japan	12	o	34.92 (2)	11	i	34.90 (3)	69.820	+0.06
3rd place, bronze medalist(s)	Jan Smeekens	Netherlands	11	o	34.80 (1)	12	i	35.06 (5)	69.860	+0.10
4	Michel Mulder	Netherlands	12	i	35.09 (6)	10	o	34.82 (1)	69.910	+0.15
5	Ronald Mulder	Netherlands	11	i	35.05 (4)	11	o	35.02 (4)	70.070	+0.31
6	Dmitry Lobkov	Russia	8	i	35.18 (8)	8	o	35.08 (6)	70.260	+0.50
7	Denis Koval	Russia	5	o	35.05 (5)	10	i	35.22 (9)	70.270	+0.51
8	Pekka Koskela	Finland	8	o	35.21 (9)	9	i	35.10 (7)	70.310	+0.55
9	Laurent Dubreuil	Canada	3	i	35.09 (7)	9	o	35.26 (10)	70.350	+0.59
10	Jamie Gregg	Canada	9	i	35.30 (12)	6	o	35.20 (8)	70.500	+0.74
11	Artur Waś	Poland	7	i	35.28 (10)	7	o	35.28 (11)	70.560	+0.80
12	Yūya Oikawa	Japan	10	o	35.30 (11)	8	i	35.28 (11)	70.580	+0.82
13	Aleksey Yesin	Russia	2	i	35.43 (16)	4	o	35.31 (13)	70.740	+0.98
14	Mika Poutala	Finland	5	i	35.37 (13)	5	o	35.41 (15)	70.780	+1.02
15	Nico Ihle	Germany	4	i	35.47 (18)	3	o	35.36 (14)	70.830	+1.07
16	Mirko Giacomo Nenzi	Italy	2	o	35.42 (15)	6	i	35.55 (17)	70.970	+1.21
17	Daniel Greig	Australia	4	o	35.56 (20)	3	i	35.49 (16)	71.050	+1.29
18	Espen Aarnes Hvammen	Norway	3	o	35.50 (19)	4	i	35.56 (18)	71.060	+1.30
19	Gilmore Junio	Canada	9	o	35.46 (17)	5	i	35.74 (20)	71.200	+1.44
20	Ryohei Haga	Japan	6	o	35.40 (14)	7	i	35.88 (22)	71.280	+1.52
21	Lee Kang-seok	South Korea	1	o	35.73 (21)	2	i	35.61 (19)	71.340	+1.58
22	Denny Ihle	Germany	1	i	36.12 (23)	2	o	35.87 (21)	71.990	+2.23
23	Mitchell Whitmore	United States	6	i	36.14 (24)	1	o	36.42 (23)	72.560	+2.80
24	Tucker Fredricks	United States	7	o	35.93 (22)	1	i	36.98 (24)	72.910	+3.15
