= 2012 World Single Distance Speed Skating Championships – Men's 500 metres =

The men's 500 metres race of the 2012 World Single Distance Speed Skating Championships was held on 25 March.

== Results ==
Rank	Name	Country	Pair	Lane	Race 1	Rank	Pair	Lane	Race 2	Rank	Total	Time behind
1st place, gold medalist(s)	Mo Tae-bum	South Korea	12	i	34.80	1	12	o	34.84	2	69.64	
2nd place, silver medalist(s)	Michel Mulder	Netherlands	10	i	34.99	5	10	o	34.66	1	69.65	+0.01
3rd place, bronze medalist(s)	Pekka Koskela	Finland	11	o	34.87	2	12	i	34.95	4	69.82	+0.18
4	Joji Kato	Japan	9	o	34.93	4	11	i	35.07	8	70.00	+0.36
5	Tucker Fredricks	United States	12	o	35.06	7	9	i	34.98	5	70.04	+0.40
6	Ronald Mulder	Netherlands	7	i	35.22	12	9	o	34.85	3	70.07	+0.43
7	Mika Poutala	Finland	5	o	35.17	10	6	i	34.99	6	70.16	+0.52
8	Dmitry Lobkov	Russia	8	i	34.87	2	11	o	35.31	14	70.18	+0.54
9	Jamie Gregg	Canada	10	o	35.03	6	10	i	35.18	11	70.21	+0.57
10	Yuya Oikawa	Japan	7	o	35.10	8	8	i	35.17	10	70.27	+0.63
11	Laurent Dubreuil	Canada	4	o	35.19	11	5	i	35.11	9	70.30	+0.66
12	Artur Waś	Poland	6	o	35.11	9	7	i	35.27	13	70.38	+0.74
13	Aleksey Yesin	Russia	3	o	35.33	15	3	i	35.26	12	70.59	+0.95
14	Jan Smeekens	Netherlands	11	i	35.71	21	4	o	34.99	6	70.70	+1.06
15	Muncef Ouardi	Canada	5	i	35.36	16	8	o	35.35	16	70.71	+1.07
16	Artyom Kuznetsov	Russia	4	i	35.57	17	7	o	35.32	15	70.89	+1.25
17	Lee Kang-seok	South Korea	8	o	35.30	13	4	i	35.60	19	70.90	+1.26
18	Keiichiro Nagashima	Japan	9	i	35.60	19	5	o	35.59	18	71.19	+1.55
19	Roman Krech	Kazakhstan	3	i	35.59	18	6	o	35.66	20	71.25	+1.61
20	Espen-Aarnes Hvammen	Norway	1	o	35.65	20	2	i	35.69	21	71.34	+1.70
21	Daniel Greig	Australia	2	i	35.79	22	3	o	35.56	17	71.35	+1.71
22	Mirko Giacomo Nenzi	Italy	2	o	36.18	24	1	i	35.90	22	72.08	+2.44
23	Denny Ihle	Germany	1	i	36.10	23	2	o	36.33	23	72.43	+2.79
	Lee Kyou-hyuk	South Korea	6	i	35.32	14			DNS		DNF	
