= 2013–14 ISU Speed Skating World Cup – World Cup 6 – Men's 500 metres =

The men's 500 metres races of the 2013–14 ISU Speed Skating World Cup 6, arranged in the Thialf arena, in Heerenveen, Netherlands, was held on 15 and 16 March 2014.

Ronald Mulder of the Netherlands won the race on Saturday, while Jan Smeekens of the Netherlands came second, and Gilmore Junio of Canada came third.

The Sunday race saw an all-Dutch podium, as Mulder and Smeekens switched places in the top, and Mulder's brother Michel Mulder came third.

== Race 1 ==
Race one took place on Saturday, 15 March, scheduled at 16:41.

=== Division A ===
Rank	Name	Nat.	Pair	Lane	Time	WC points	GWC points
1st place, gold medalist(s)	Ronald Mulder	(Netherlands)	10	o	34.81	150	7.5
2nd place, silver medalist(s)	Jan Smeekens	(Netherlands)	8	i	34.97	120	6
3rd place, bronze medalist(s)	Gilmore Junio	(Canada)	6	i	35.00	105	5.25
4	Nico Ihle	(Germany)	5	o	35.089	90	4.5
4	Artur Waś	(Poland)	1	i	35.089	90	4.5
6	Michel Mulder	(Netherlands)	10	i	35.15	45	—
7	Jesper Hospes	(Netherlands)	8	o	35.170	40	
8	Dmitry Lobkov	(Russia)	7	i	35.171	36	
9	Mirko Giacomo Nenzi	(Italy)	3	o	35.20	32	
10	Aleksey Yesin	(Russia)	3	i	35.21	28	
11	Mitchell Whitmore	(United States)	7	o	35.22	24	
12	Daniel Greig	(Australia)	2	i	35.25	21	
13	Yūya Oikawa	(Japan)	6	o	35.280	18	
14	Tucker Fredricks	(United States)	9	o	35.281	16	
15	Ryohei Haga	(Japan)	4	i	35.417	14	
16	William Dutton	(Canada)	2	o	35.419	12	
17	Jamie Gregg	(Canada)	5	i	35.44	10	
18	Artyom Kuznetsov	(Russia)	9	i	35.81	8	
19	David Bosa	(Italy)	1	o	35.85	6	
20	Pekka Koskela	(Finland)	4	o	36.24	5	

== Race 2 ==
Race two took place on Sunday, 16 March, scheduled at 16:49.

=== Division A ===
Rank	Name	Nat.	Pair	Lane	Time	WC points	GWC points
1st place, gold medalist(s)	Jan Smeekens	(Netherlands)	10	o	34.78	150	7.5
2nd place, silver medalist(s)	Ronald Mulder	(Netherlands)	10	i	34.89	120	6
3rd place, bronze medalist(s)	Michel Mulder	(Netherlands)	7	o	34.94	105	5.25
4	Nico Ihle	(Germany)	9	i	35.01	90	4.5
5	Gilmore Junio	(Canada)	9	o	35.07	75	3.75
6	Artur Waś	(Poland)	8	o	35.08	45	—
7	Daniel Greig	(Australia)	4	o	35.25	40	
8	Jesper Hospes	(Netherlands)	8	i	35.26	36	
9	Jamie Gregg	(Canada)	2	o	35.30	32	
10	Dmitry Lobkov	(Russia)	6	o	35.32	28	
11	Aleksey Yesin	(Russia)	5	o	35.36	24	
12	William Dutton	(Canada)	3	i	35.41	21	
13	Mirko Giacomo Nenzi	(Italy)	7	i	35.45	18	
14	Artyom Kuznetsov	(Russia)	1	o	35.46	16	
15	Mitchell Whitmore	(United States)	6	i	35.60	14	
16	David Bosa	(Italy)	2	i	35.74	12	
17	Pekka Koskela	(Finland)	1	i	35.79	10	
18	Ryohei Haga	(Japan)	3	o	35.95	8	
19	Tucker Fredricks	(United States)	4	i	48.14	6	
20	Yūya Oikawa	(Japan)	5	i	1:02.79	5	
