= Speed skating at the 2014 Winter Olympics – Men's 500 metres =

Men's 500 metres at the XXII Olympic Winter Games
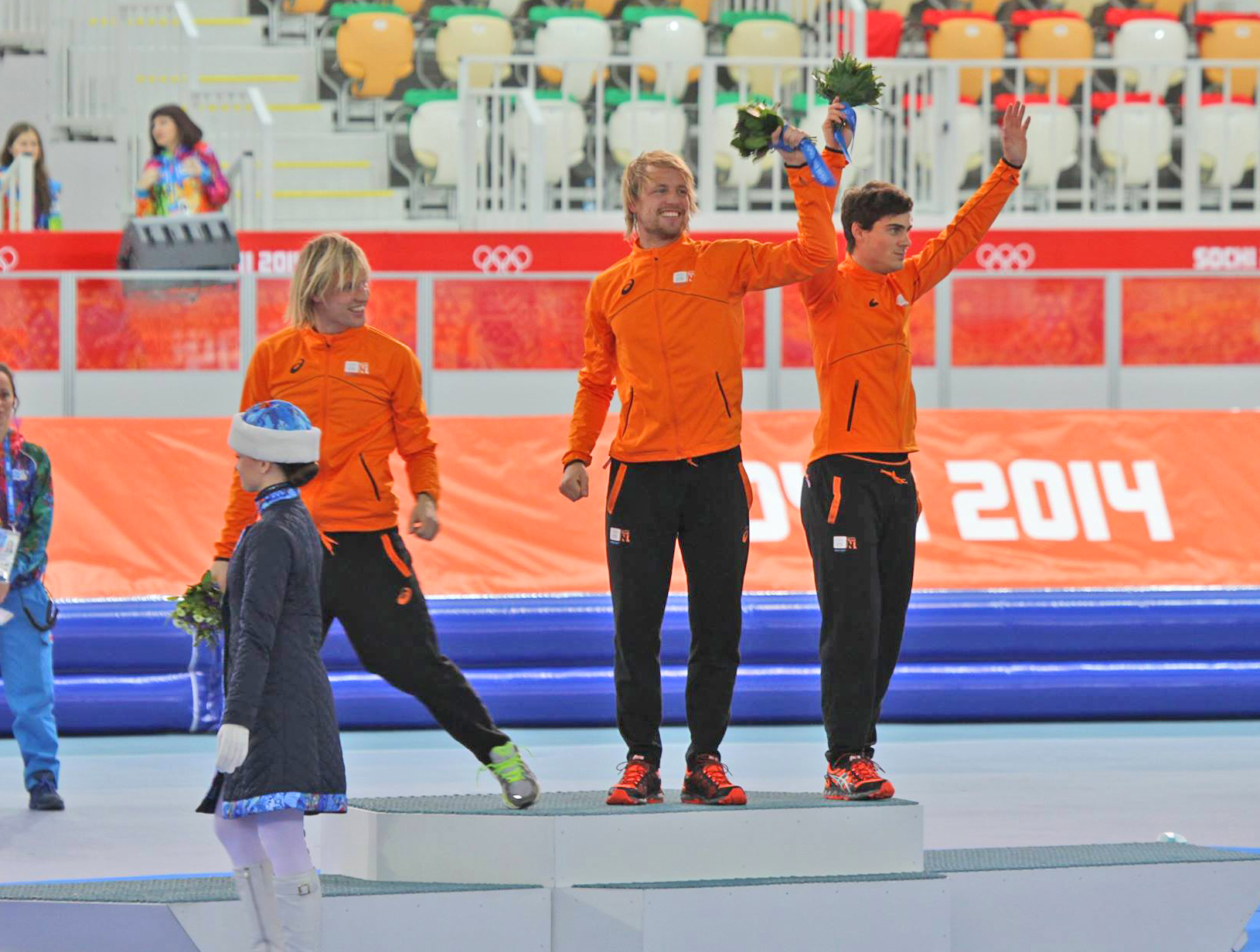
- The podium
- Venue: Adler Arena Skating Center
- Date: 10 February 2014
- Competitors: 40 from 16 nations
- Winning time: 69.31 (34.63 & 34.67)

Medalists
1st place, gold medalist(s)		Michel Mulder	Netherlands
2nd place, silver medalist(s)		Jan Smeekens	Netherlands
3rd place, bronze medalist(s)		Ronald Mulder	Netherlands

The men's 500 metres speed skating competition of the 2014 Sochi Olympics was held at Adler Arena Skating Center on 10 February 2014. Michel Mulder won the gold medal.

== Qualification ==
A total of forty speed skaters could qualify for this distance, with a maximum of four skaters per country. The top 20 of the men's 500 metres World Cup standings after World Cup 4 in Berlin secured a spot for their country. Then the additional 20 spots were awarded based on a time ranking of all times skated in the World Cup and the 2014 World Sprint Speed Skating Championships. A reserve list was also made.

== Competition schedule ==
All times are (UTC+4).

Date	Time	Event
10 February	17:00	Men's 500m Final – Race 1
10 February	18:55	Men's 500m Final – Race 2

== Records ==
Prior to this competition, the existing world and Olympic records were as follows.

500 meters (1 race)

World record	Jeremy Wotherspoon (CAN)	34.03	Salt Lake City, United States	9 November 2007
Olympic record	Casey FitzRandolph (USA)	34.42	Salt Lake City, United States	11 February 2002

500 meters x 2 (2 races)

World record	Jeremy Wotherspoon (CAN)	68.31	Calgary, Canada	15 March 2008
Olympic record	Casey FitzRandolph (USA)	69.23	Salt Lake City, United States	11 February 2002

At the 2013 World Single Distance Speed Skating Championships the track records were set by Jan Smeekens at 34.80 (single race) and by Mo Tae-bum at 69.760 (combination).

The following records were set during this competition.

Date	Round	Athlete	Country	Time	Record
10 February	Race 1 Pair 19; Race 2 Pair 19	Michel Mulder	Netherlands	69.31	TR
10 February	Race 1 Pair 20; Race 2 Pair 17	Ronald Mulder	Netherlands	69.46	TR
10 February	Race 2 Pair 17	Ronald Mulder	Netherlands	34.49	TR
10 February	Race 1 Pair 15	Jan Smeekens	Netherlands	34.59	TR

TR = track record

== Results ==
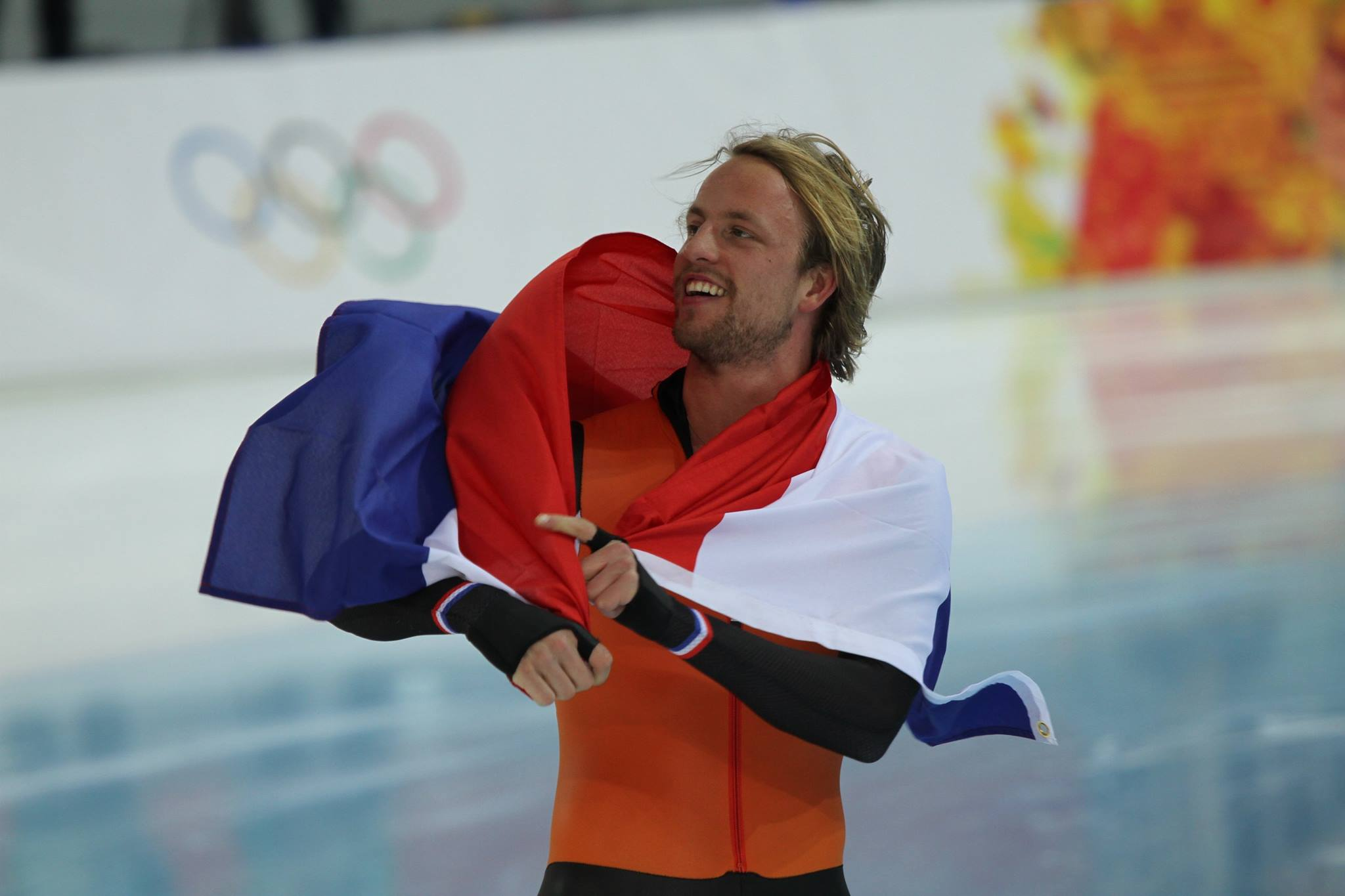
Michel Mulder celebrating his victory

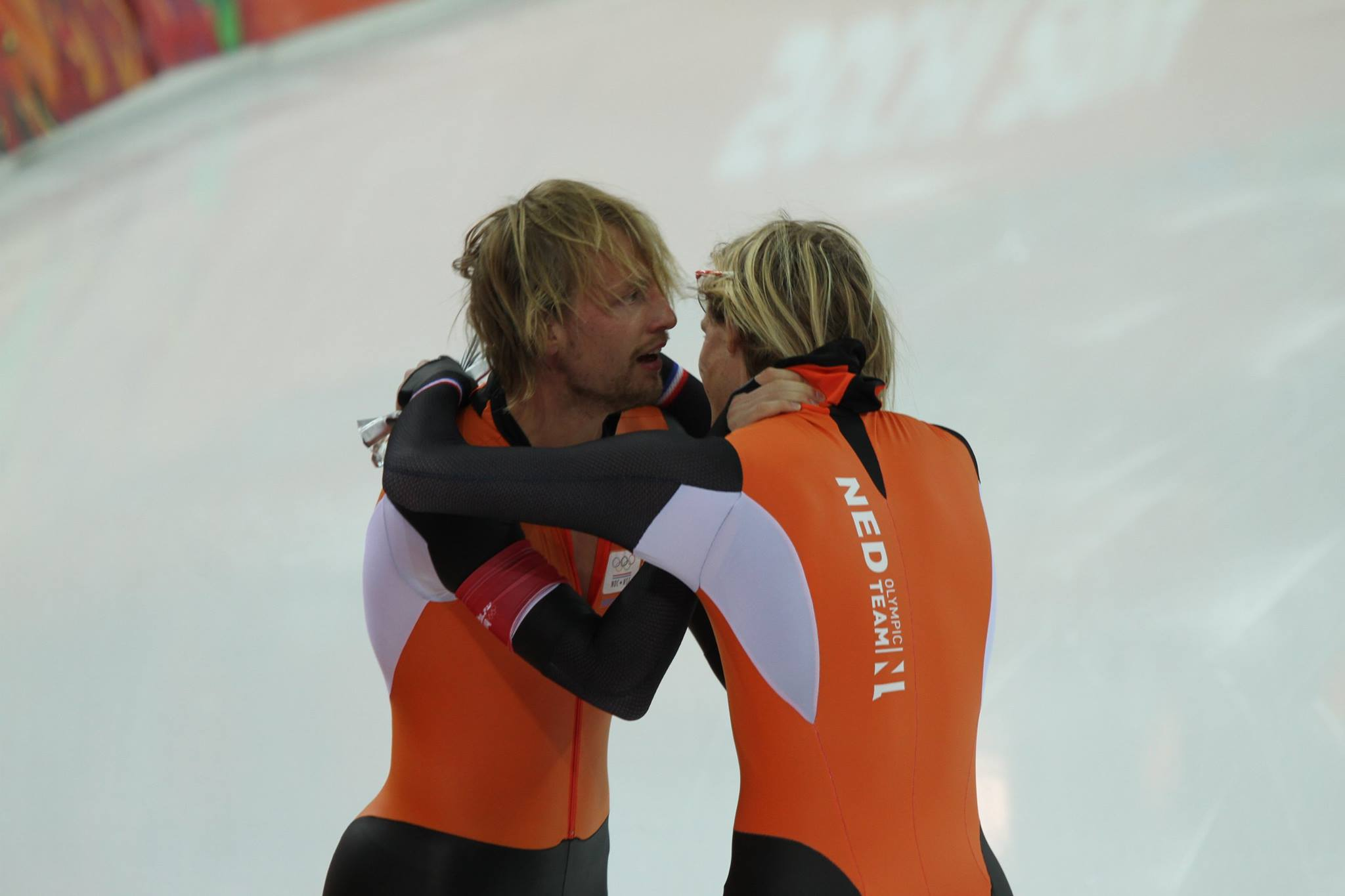
The twins Michel Mulder and Ronald Mulder finished first and third

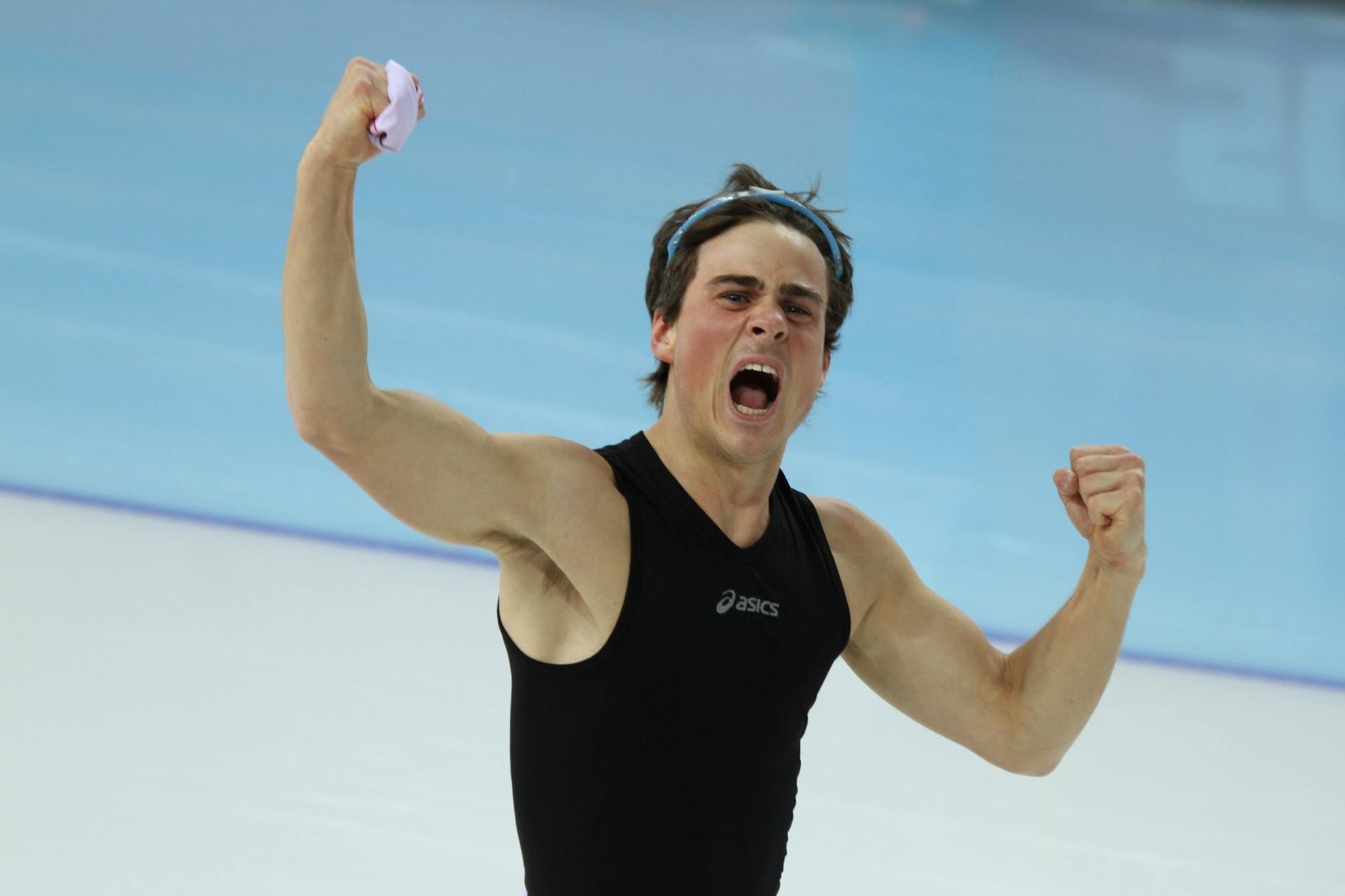
Jan Smeekens thought temporarily that he had won the gold medal. Later his time was adjusted and he finished second

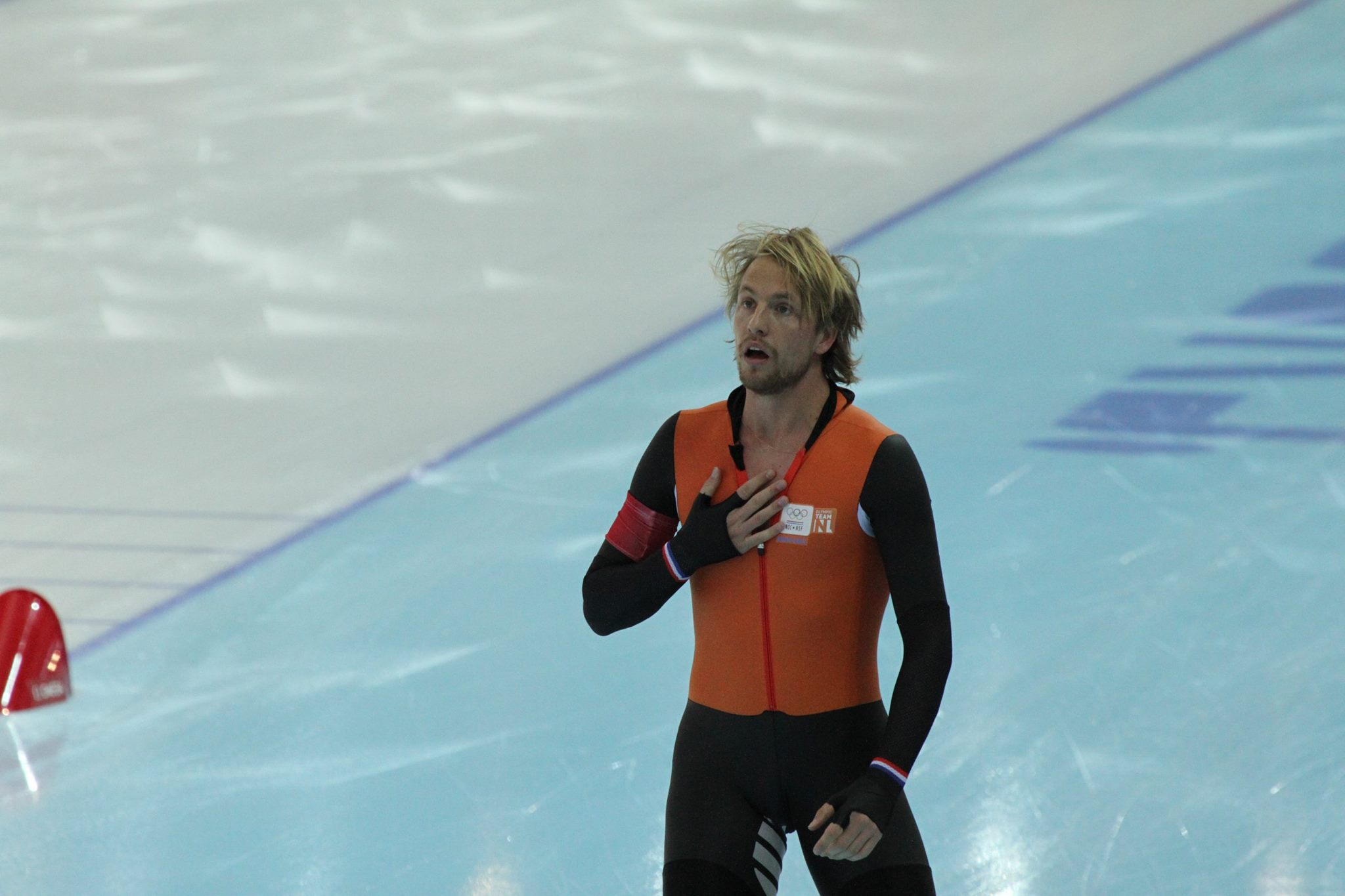
Michel Mulder is unsure who won the gold medal

The races were held at 17:00 and 18:55.

Rank	Name	Country	Pair	Lane	Race 1	Rank	Notes	Pair	Lane	Race 2	Rank	Notes	Total	Time behind	Notes
1st place, gold medalist(s)	Michel Mulder	Netherlands	19	I	34.63	2		19	O	34.67	2		69.31	—	TR
2nd place, silver medalist(s)	Jan Smeekens	Netherlands	15	I	34.59	1	TR	20	O	34.72	3		69.32	+0.01	
3rd place, bronze medalist(s)	Ronald Mulder	Netherlands	20	I	34.97	6		17	O	34.49	1	TR	69.46	+0.15	TR
4	Mo Tae-bum	South Korea	18	O	34.84	4		19	I	34.84	5		69.68	+0.38	
5	Joji Kato	Japan	18	I	34.96	5		18	O	34.77	4		69.74	+0.43	
6	Keiichiro Nagashima	Japan	19	O	34.79	3		20	I	35.25	16		70.04	+0.73	
7	Roman Krech	Kazakhstan	3	I	35.04	9		16	O	35.00	6		70.04	+0.73	
8	Nico Ihle	Germany	11	O	34.99	7		18	I	35.11	9		70.10	+0.79	
9	Artur Waś	Poland	7	O	35.01	8		17	I	35.19	12		70.20	+0.90	
10	Gilmore Junio	Canada	14	I	35.15	11		15	O	35.09	7		70.25	+0.94	
11	Jamie Gregg	Canada	13	I	35.17	13		14	O	35.10	8		70.27	+0.96	
12	Espen Aarnes Hvammen	Norway	8	I	35.20	16		13	O	35.21	13		70.42	+1.11	
13	Denis Koval	Russia	9	O	35.19	14		14	I	35.24	15		70.44	+1.13	
14	William Dutton	Canada	4	O	35.27	18		11	I	35.17	11		70.44	+1.13	
15	Yūya Oikawa	Japan	16	I	35.24	17		12	O	35.22	14		70.46	+1.15	
16	Aleksey Yesin	Russia	12	O	35.09	10		16	I	35.41	19		70.50	+1.19	
17	Pekka Koskela	Finland	13	O	35.19	15		13	I	35.41	20		70.61	+1.30	
18	Lee Kyou-hyuk	South Korea	3	O	35.16	12		15	I	35.48	23		70.65	+1.34	
19	Artyom Kuznetsov	Russia	20	O	35.51	28		6	I	35.14	10		70.66	+1.35	
20	Yuji Kamijo	Japan	4	I	35.37	21		11	O	35.48	24		70.85	+1.54	
21	Kim Jun-ho	South Korea	5	O	35.43	25		8	I	35.42	21		70.85	+1.54	
22	Lee Kang-seok	South Korea	10	O	35.45	26		7	I	35.42	22		70.87	+1.56	
23	Dmitry Lobkov	Russia	17	I	35.50	27		8	O	35.36	18		70.88	+1.57	
24	Shani Davis	United States	5	I	35.39	22		10	O	35.59	28		70.98	+1.67	
25	Muncef Ouardi	Canada	1	O	35.39	23		9	I	35.60	29		70.99	+1.68	
26	Tucker Fredricks	United States	17	O	35.27	18		12	I	35.72	37		70.99	+1.68	
27	Mitchell Whitmore	United States	14	O	35.34	20		10	I	35.71	35		71.05	+1.75	
28	Mirko Giacomo Nenzi	Italy	10	I	35.56	29		7	O	35.51	25		71.07	+1.76	
29	Mika Poutala	Finland	15	O	35.58	30		5	I	35.56	27		71.14	+1.83	
30	Mu Zhongsheng	China	1	I	35.59	31		6	O	35.65	32		71.25	+1.94	
31	David Bosa	Italy	8	O	35.63	32		4	I	35.64	31		71.28	+1.97	
32	Håvard Holmefjord Lorentzen	Norway	7	I	35.78	37		2	I	35.53	26		71.30	+1.99	
33	Sung Ching-yang	Chinese Taipei	11	I	35.73	35		4	O	35.63	30		71.36	+2.05	
34	Samuel Schwarz	Germany	12	I	35.69	34		5	O	35.68	34		71.37	+2.06	
35	Bai Qiuming	China	9	I	35.73	36		3	O	35.71	36		71.45	+2.14	
36	Artur Nogal	Poland	2	O	35.83	38		3	I	35.66	33		71.49	+2.18	
37	Haralds Silovs	Latvia	2	I	36.12	39		1	O	36.32	38		72.44	+3.13	
38	Stefan Groothuis	Netherlands	6	I	35.42	24		9	O	56.81	39		92.24	+22.93	
39	Daniel Greig	Australia	16	O	80.65	40		2	I	35.29	17		115.84	+46.53	
	Brian Hansen	United States	6	O	35.64	33				DNS					

TR = track record, DNS = did not start
