= Qiuming =

Qiuming is a transliteration of multiple Chinese given names. Notable people with these names include:

- Bai Qiuming (born 1994), Chinese speed skater
- Cheng Qiuming (born 1960), Chinese mathematical geoscientist
- Wang Qiuming (born 1993), Chinese professional football player
- Zuo Qiuming (556–451 BCE or 502 – 422 BCE), Chinese historian
