= List of Chinese Taipei records in speed skating =

The following are the national records in speed skating in Chinese Taipei maintained by the Chinese Taipei Skating Union.

== Men ==
Event	Record	Athlete	Date	Meet	Place	Ref
500 meters	34.64	Sung Ching-yang	15 November 2013	World Cup	Salt Lake City, United States	
500 meters × 2	70.70	Sung Ching-yang	11 January 2015	Asian Single Distance Championships	Changchun, China	
1000 meters	1:08.26	Tai Wei-lin	28 January 2024	World Cup	Salt Lake City, United States	
1500 meters	1:45.91	Tai Wei-lin	15 November 2025	World Cup	Salt Lake City, United States	
3000 meters	3:49.97	Tai Wei-lin	24 August 2024	Summer Classic	Calgary, Canada	
5000 meters	6:37.09	Tai Wei-lin	1 December 2017	World Cup	Calgary, Canada	
10000 meters						
Team pursuit (8 laps)						
Sprint combination	156.905 pts	Zhang Yongdai	March 2005	Olympic Oval Final	Calgary, Canada	
Small combination						
Big combination						

== Women ==
Event	Record	Athlete	Date	Meet	Place	Ref
500 meters	37.14	Chen Ying-chu	22 November 2025	World Cup	Calgary, Canada	
500 meters × 2	77.87	Huang Yu-ting	13 October 2017	Fall Challenge	Salt Lake City, United States	
1000 meters	1:13.44	Huang Yu-ting	4 December 2021	World Cup	Salt Lake City, United States	
1500 meters	1:54.83	Huang Yu-ting	9 December 2017	World Cup	Salt Lake City, United States	
3000 meters	4:18.99	Huang Yu-ting	26 August 2017	Desert Classic	Salt Lake City, United States	
5000 meters						
10000 meters						
Team pursuit (6 laps)						
Sprint combination	156.385 pts	Huang Yu-ting	23–24 February 2019	World Sprint Championships	Heerenveen, Netherlands	
Mini combination						
Small combination						
