= Nidec Sankyo =

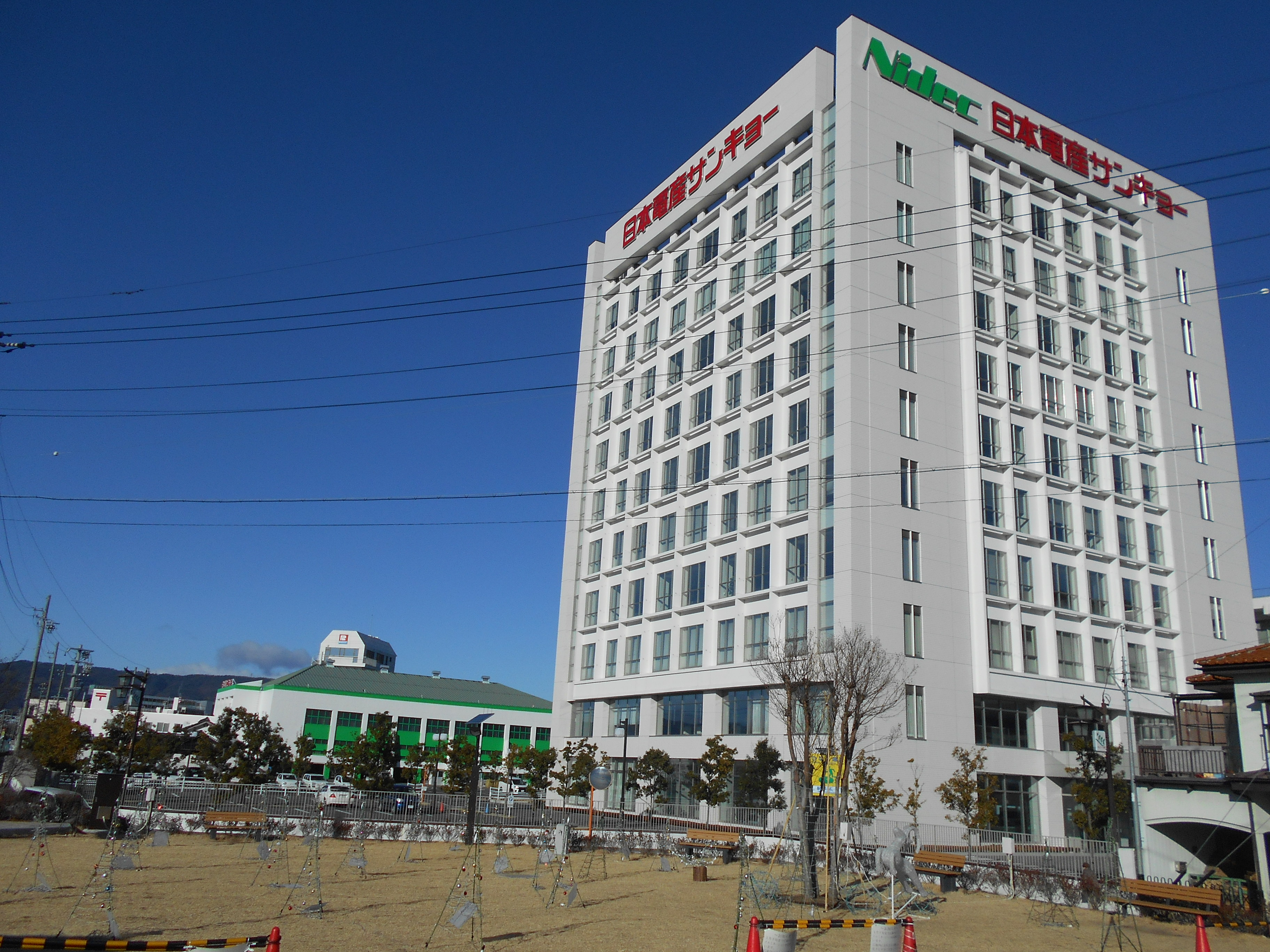
- Founded: 1946
- Headquarters: Nagano Prefecture
- Website: http://www.nidec-sankyo.co.jp/english/index.html

Nidec Sankyo Corporation (日本電産サンキョー株式会社, Nihon Densan Sankyō Kabushikigaisha) is a Japanese music box and electrical component manufacturing company and a member of the Nidec Group. The company was founded as Sankyo Seiki Manufacturing in 1946; Nidec Corporation became the majority shareholder of the company in 2003. In fiscal 2013, it had a revenue of more than 9.9 billion yen (US$800 million) from the manufacture of various electronic components.

Nidec Sankyo has had a speed skating club since 1957 and two of its members, Keiichiro Nagashima and Joji Kato, won medals at the 2010 Vancouver Winter Olympics.
