= Muncef Ouardi =

Canadian speed skater

Personal information
- Born: April 17, 1986 (age 40) Quebec City, Quebec
- Height: 1.80 m (5 ft 11 in)
- Weight: 78 kg (172 lb; 12.3 st)

Sport
- Country: Canada
- Sport: Speed skating

Muncef Ouardi (born April 17, 1986 in Quebec City, Quebec) is a Canadian speed skater of Moroccan descent. He competed for Canada at the 2014 Winter Olympics in the 500 m.
