= Bai Qiuming =

Chinese speed skater (born 1994)

Personal information
- Born: August 30, 1994 (age 31) Anda, China
- Height: 5 ft 8 in (173 cm)
- Weight: 154 lb (70 kg)

Sport
- Country: China
- Sport: Speed skating

Achievements and titles
- Highest world ranking: 40 (500m)

Bai Qiuming (born August 30, 1994 in Anda) is a Chinese speed skater.

Bai competed at the 2014 Winter Olympics for China. In the 500 metres he finished 35th overall.

Bai made his World Cup debut in November 2013. As of September 2014, Bai's top World Cup finish is 3rd in a 500m B race at Salt Lake City in 2013–14. His best overall finish in the World Cup is 40th, in the 500 metres in 2013–14.
