= Markus Puolakka =

Finnish speed skater

Personal information
- Nationality: Finnish
- Born: 6 May 1985 (age 39); Pieksämäki, Finland

Sport
- Sport: Speed skating

Markus Puolakka (born 6 May 1985) is a Finnish speed skater. He competed in the men's 500 metres event at the 2010 Winter Olympics.
