= Maciej Biega =

Polish speed skater

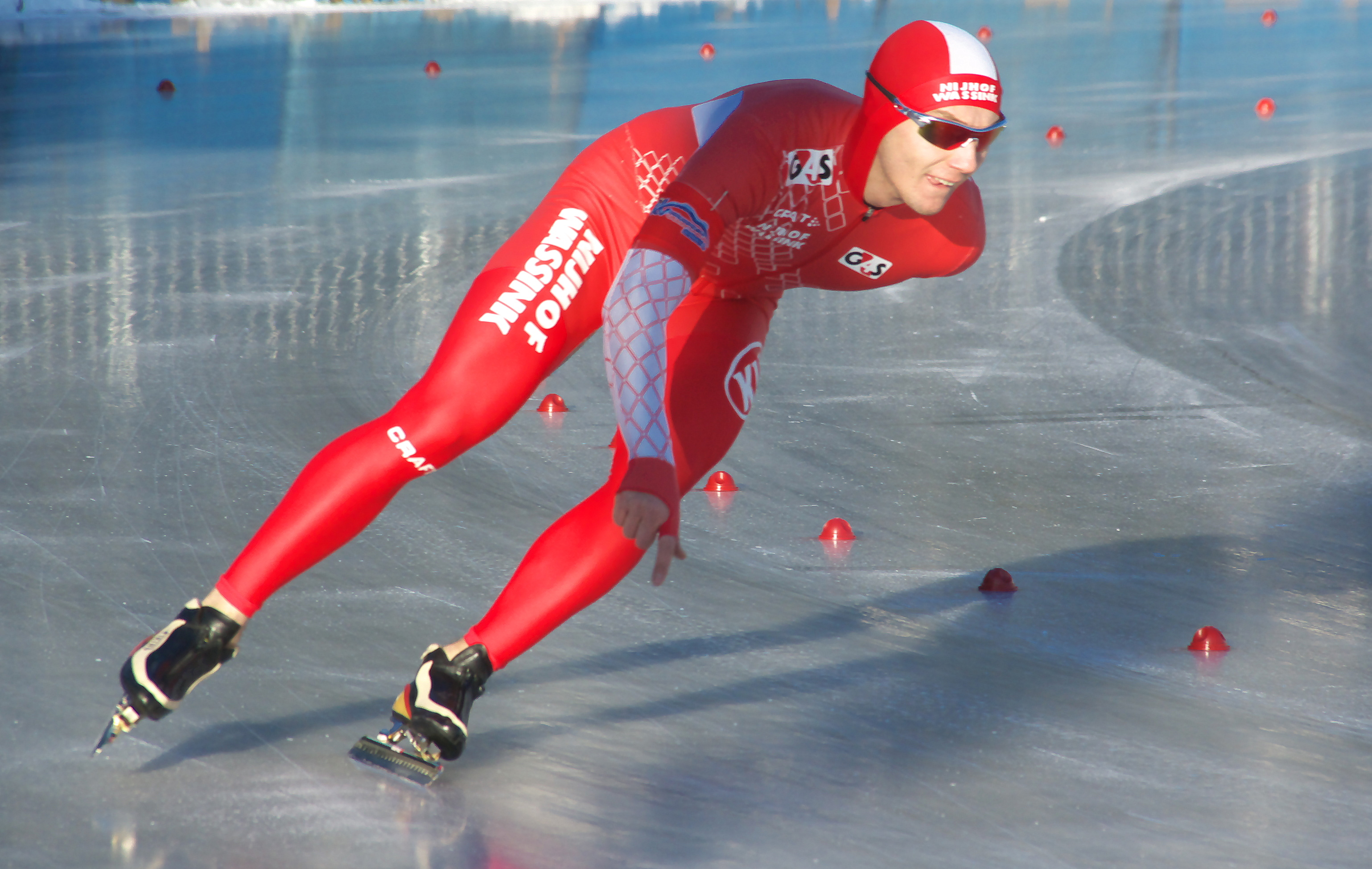

Personal information
- Nationality: Polish
- Born: 7 February 1989 (age 36); Sanok, Poland

Sport
- Sport: Speed skating

Maciej Biega (born 7 February 1989) is a Polish speed skater. He was born in Sanok. He competed at the 2010 Winter Olympics in Vancouver, in men's 500 metres.
