= Akio Ohta =

Japanese speed skater (born 1984)

Personal information
- Nationality: Japanese
- Born: 3 September 1984 (age 40); Hokkaido, Japan

Sport
- Sport: Speed skating

Akio Ohta (born 3 September 1984) is a Japanese speed skater. He competed in the men's 500 metres event at the 2010 Winter Olympics.
