= Mu Zhongsheng =

Chinese speed-skater (born 1991)

Personal information
- Born: July 26, 1991 (age 34) Anda, China
- Height: 6 ft 3 in (191 cm)
- Weight: 183 lb (83 kg)

Sport
- Country: China
- Sport: Speed skating

Achievements and titles
- Highest world ranking: 42 (500m)

Mu Zhongsheng (born July 26, 1991, in Anda) is a Chinese speed-skater.

Mu competed at the 2014 Winter Olympics for China. In the 500 metres he finished 30th overall.

Mu made his World Cup debut in December 2012. As of September 2014, Mu's top World Cup finish is 7th in a pair of B races. His best overall finish in the World Cup is 42nd, in the 500 metres in 2013–14.
