= Tommi Pulli =

Finnish speed skater (born 1992)

Personal information
- Born: 18 July 1992 (age 33) Seinäjoki, Finland
- Height: 6 ft 2 in (188 cm)
- Weight: 185 lb (84 kg)

Sport
- Country: Finland
- Sport: Speed skating

Achievements and titles
- Highest world ranking: 36 (1000m)

Tommi Pulli (born 18 July 1992) is a Finnish speed skater.

Pulli competed at the 2014 Winter Olympics for Finland. In the 1000 metres he finished 37th overall.

As of September 2014, Pulli's best performance at the World Single Distance Speed Skating Championships is 23rd, in the 2013 1000 metres. His best finish at the World Sprint Speed Skating Championships is 24th, in 2014. He won three medals at the World Junior Speed Skating Championships, including two silvers at 1000m.

Pulli made his World Cup debut in November 2010. As of September 2014, Pulli's top World Cup finish is 2nd in a 1000m B race at Harbin in 2012–13. His best overall finish in the World Cup is 36th, in the 1000 metres in 2012–13.
