= Fyodor Mezentsev =

Kazakhstani speed skater (born 1989)

Personal information
- Born: 19 November 1989 (age 36) Almaty, Kazakh SSR, Soviet Union
- Height: 1.80 m (5 ft 11 in)
- Weight: 80 kg (176 lb)

Sport
- Country: Kazakhstan
- Sport: Speed skating

Achievements and titles
- Highest world ranking: No. 29 (1000m)

Fyodor Mezentsev (born 19 November 1989) is a Kazakhstani speed skater. He was brought up in the cit of Almaty and was introduced to skating when he was 10 years old from his mother and sister. He was coached by Dmitry Babenko later in life. As a young adult, he studied international law at Al-Farabi Kazakh National University in Almaty, Kazakhstan.

== Career ==
Mezentsev competed at the 2014 Winter Olympics for Kazakhstan. In the 1000 metres he finished 33rd overall and in the 1500 metres he was 35th.

As of September 2014, Mezentsev's best performance at the World Sprint Speed Skating Championships is 28th, in 2013.

Mezentsev made his World Cup debut in February 2009. As of September 2014, Mezentsev's top World Cup finish is 11th in a 1000m race at Heerenveen in 2012–13. His best overall finish in the World Cup is 29th, in the 1000m in 2012–13.
