= Mo Tae-bum =

South Korean speed skater

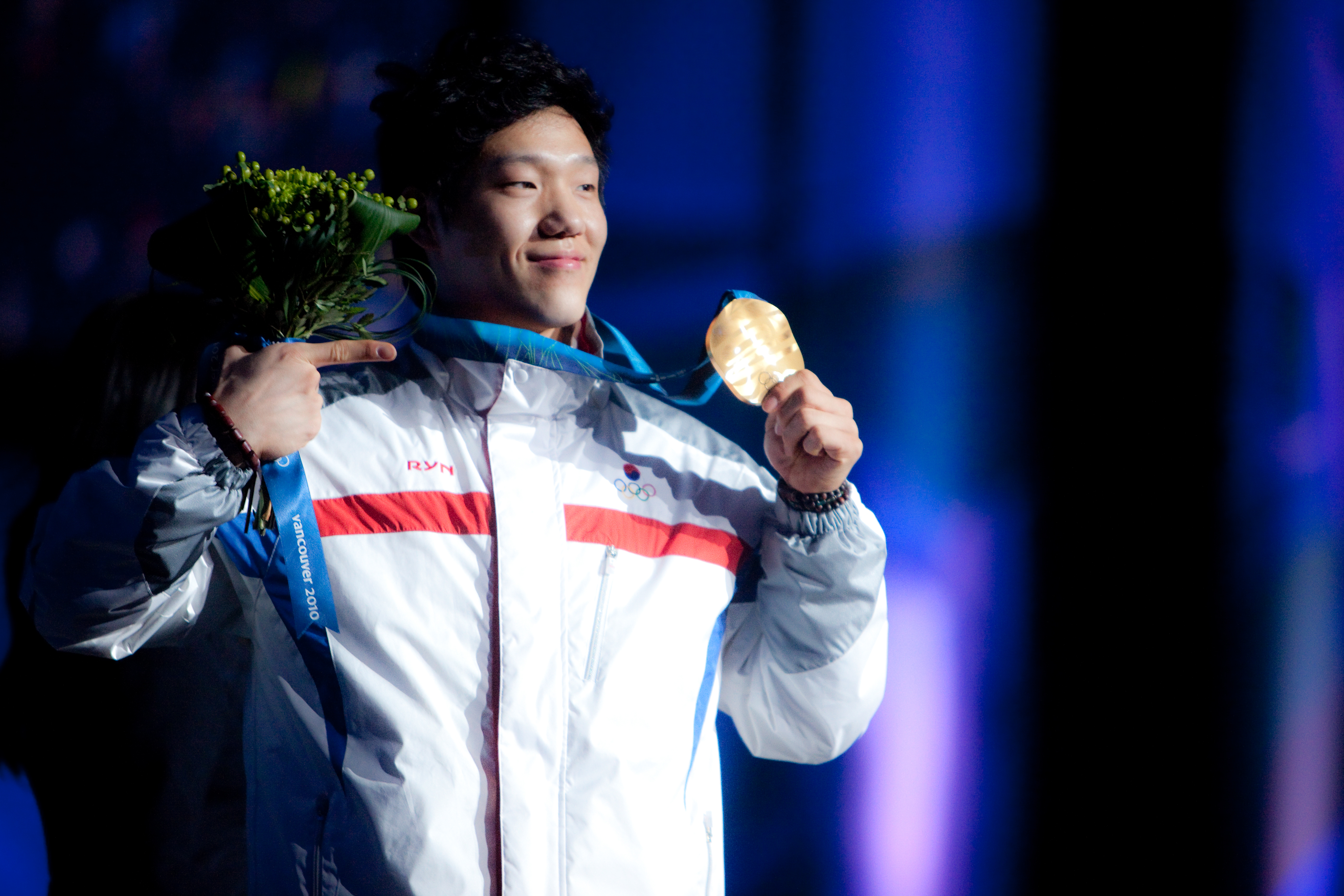

Personal information
- Born: 15 February 1989 (age 37) Seoul, South Korea
- Height: 1.77 m (5 ft 10 in)
- Weight: 90 kg (198 lb)

Sport
- Country: South Korea
- Sport: Speed skating
Medal record
Men's speed skating
Representing South Korea
Event	1st	2nd	3rd
Olympic Games	1	1	0
World Sprint Championships	0	1	1
World Single Distance Championships	2	1	0
Winter Universiade	2	0	0
World Junior Championships	2	0	0
Asian Winter Games	0	2	0
Total	7	5	1
Olympic Games
Gold medal – first place	2010 Vancouver	500 m
Silver medal – second place	2010 Vancouver	1000 m
World Sprint Championships
Silver medal – second place	2011 Heerenveen	Sprint
Bronze medal – third place	2012 Calgary	Sprint
World Single Distance Championships
Gold medal – first place	2012 Heerenveen	500 m
Gold medal – first place	2013 Sochi	500 m
Silver medal – second place	2013 Sochi	1000 m
Winter Universiade
Gold medal – first place	2009 Harbin	1000 m
Gold medal – first place	2009 Harbin	1500 m
Bronze medal – third place	2007 Turin	500 m
Bronze medal – third place	2007 Turin	1500 m
World Junior Championships
Gold medal – first place	2006 Erfurt	500 m
Gold medal – first place	2006 Erfurt	1500 m
Asian Winter Games
Silver medal – second place	2011 Astana-Almaty	1500 m
Silver medal – second place	2011 Astana-Almaty	Team pursuit

- Mo Tae-bum
- Hangul: 모태범
- Hanja: 牟太釩
- RR: Mo Taebeom
- MR: Mo T'aebŏm

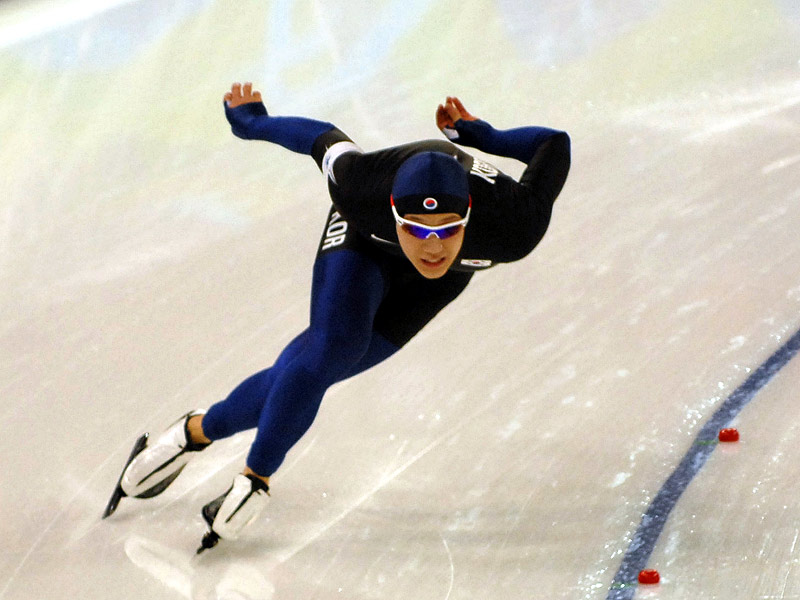
Mo Tae-bum during the 500 m speed skating competition at the 2010 Winter Olympics.

Mo Tae-bum (Korean: 모태범, Hanja: 牟太釩; Korean pronunciation: [mo.tʰɛ̝.bʌm]; born 15 February 1989) is a South Korean speed skater. He is the 2010 Olympic Champion and the 2012 and 2013 World Champion in 500 m. He started speedskating while in the third grade. Prior to the 2010 Winter Olympics, Mo won two distances at the 2006 World Junior Speed Skating Championships. He has competed on the national level since 2004 and has competed internationally since 2005.

He won two Junior World Championships in 2006, but did not win any other events until 2009. In 2009 he won gold in the 1000 m and 1500 m events at the Winter Universiade. The international community gave him little attention before the 2010 Winter Olympic Games, but he became the first Korean to win a gold medal in a long track speed skating event as well as earning the silver medal in the 1000 m race. This was a large upset, as he was ranked fourteenth in the world in the 500 m race. Lee Myung-bak congratulated Mo for his achievements in speed skating following these wins.

== Early life ==
Mo Tae-bum was born in Seoul to father Mo Yeong-yeol and mother Jeong Yeon-hwa in 1989. He has one elder sister, Mo Eun-yeong. Mo started skating when his father suggested it while he was in third grade at Eunseok Elementary School. His participation in the school skating team led him to win a cup from rival Lila Elementary School, which had dominated the age group at that time. Since then, Mo has been a close friend to Lee Seung-hoon, a fellow speed skater who also won a silver and a gold medal from the 2010 Winter Olympics. As Mo grew older, he almost gave up skating but, after three years of indecision, he decided against giving it up on the advice of his mother. Mo and his family currently live in the city of Pocheon, Gyeonggi province.

As of 2010, Mo is a junior at Korea National Sport University.

== Junior career ==
Mo's first event was at the 2005 South Korean Single Distance Championships, which occurred on 23 and 24 November 2004. He finished tenth in the 1000 m race with a time of 1:16.81 and third in the 1500 m event with a time of 1:59.47. His next event was the 2005 World Junior Speed Skating Championships, where he participated in the 500, 1500, 3000 and 5000 m events. However, he did not finish in the top ten in any event except the 500 m, in which he took fifth place with a time of 38.21.

In 2006, he attended the 2006 South Korean Sprint Championship, participating in the 500 m, 1000 m, and Samalog events as well as in the 1000 m event at the 2006 South Korean Single Distance Championships, where he finished in fifth place with a time of 1:13.99. He participated in the last eligible race of his junior career at the 2006 World Junior Speed Skating Championships in Erfurt, taking first place in both the 500 m, with a time of 35.83, and the 1500 m, with a time of 1:49.71.

== Senior career ==
Prior to the 2010 Winter Olympics, Mo had never won a non-junior race. His first adult competition was in the 2007 South Korean Single Distance Championships. He did not place in the top ten in an individual event at the 2008–09 World Cup, finishing in tenth place overall. At the 2009 World Single Distance Speed Skating Championships, he came in eighth place in the 1000 m event with a time of 1:10.11, and eleventh place with a time of 1:48.07 in the 1500 m event.

At the 2009 Winter Universiade, he won the 1000 and 1500 m events.

He has a rivalry with speed skater Shani Davis, who has been faster in all four 1000 m races in the 2009–10 season. However, Mo has always been in second or third place in these races.

== 2010 Vancouver Winter Olympics ==
Mo qualified for the 500, 1000 and 1500 m events at the 2010 Winter Olympics, and was an alternate for the men's team pursuit. He won the gold medal in the 500 m event with a time of 34.92 for his first run and 34.90 for his second run. He won the event on his 21st birthday, and was the first Korean to win an Olympic gold medal in an event outside of short track speed skating. He beat fellow South Koreans Lee Kang-seok and Lee Kyou-hyuk, who were ranked one and two in the world respectively, and celebrated by skating around the ice with a gaudy helmet. He also won a silver medal in the 1000 m event, missing the gold medal, won by Shani Davis, by 18 hundredths of a second, but became the first South Korean to win two medals in an event other than short track speed skating. Mo finished fifth at the 1500 m event, with a time of 1:46.47.

=== Response to gold medal ===
Mo had been seen as a dark horse, ranked fourteenth in the world, and was surprised by his win. Park Pil-soon, head of the Korean Olympic Committee's international affairs department commented, "Mo was an unknown, and his gold medal win marks the start of a new generation in South Korean speed skating after Lee Kyou-hyuk." In an interview after the event, he described himself as a risk-taker, and expressed interests in cars and motorcycles. President Lee Myung-bak sent a message congratulating Mo, calling him a "proud treasure who rewrote South Korea's speed skating history", and said that he brought jubilation to the South Korean people with his strong spirit and excellent skills.

Before the Olympics started the Korean Olympic Team held a press conference; however, he was asked few questions. He stated that, although it was disappointing, it helped him focus on the race. After the race, he personally reacted by stating that he "only imagined and dreamed about it" and saw it as a warm-up for his main event, the 1000 m.

He received a warm welcome when he returned to Korea, and his parents greeted him with a homemade banner.

== Personal life ==
On 30 June 2022, it was confirmed that Mo was in a relationship with Miss Korea's ballerina Lim Sa-rang, with whom they developed a relationship from the variety show Groom's Class. On 2 June 2023, Lim's agency confirmed their break-up.

== Personal records ==
Event	Time
500 m	34.28
1000 m	1:07.26
1500 m	1:42.85
3000 m	3:58.05
5000 m	7:03.38

== Filmography ==
=== Television show ===
Year	Title	Network	Role	Notes	Ref.
2020–2021	The Gentlemen's League	JTBC	Cast member	a.k.a Let's Play Soccer (뭉쳐야 찬다)	
2021–2023	The Gentlemen's League 2	JTBC/Netflix	Cast member	a.k.a Let's Play Soccer 2 (뭉쳐야 찬다 2)	
2022	Groom's Class	Channel A	Cast member		
2023	The King of Ssireum	ENA	Contestant	Spinoff	
2023	The Best Fighter in the World 2	Channel A	Contestant	Season 2	
2023-2024	The Gentlemen's League 3	JTBC/Netflix	Cast member	a.k.a Let's Play Soccer 3 (뭉쳐야 찬다 3)	

=== Web shows ===
Year	Title	Network	Role	Notes	Ref.
2024	Physical 100: Season 2 - Underground	Netflix	Contestant	Season 2	
