= Denis Koval =

Russian speed skater

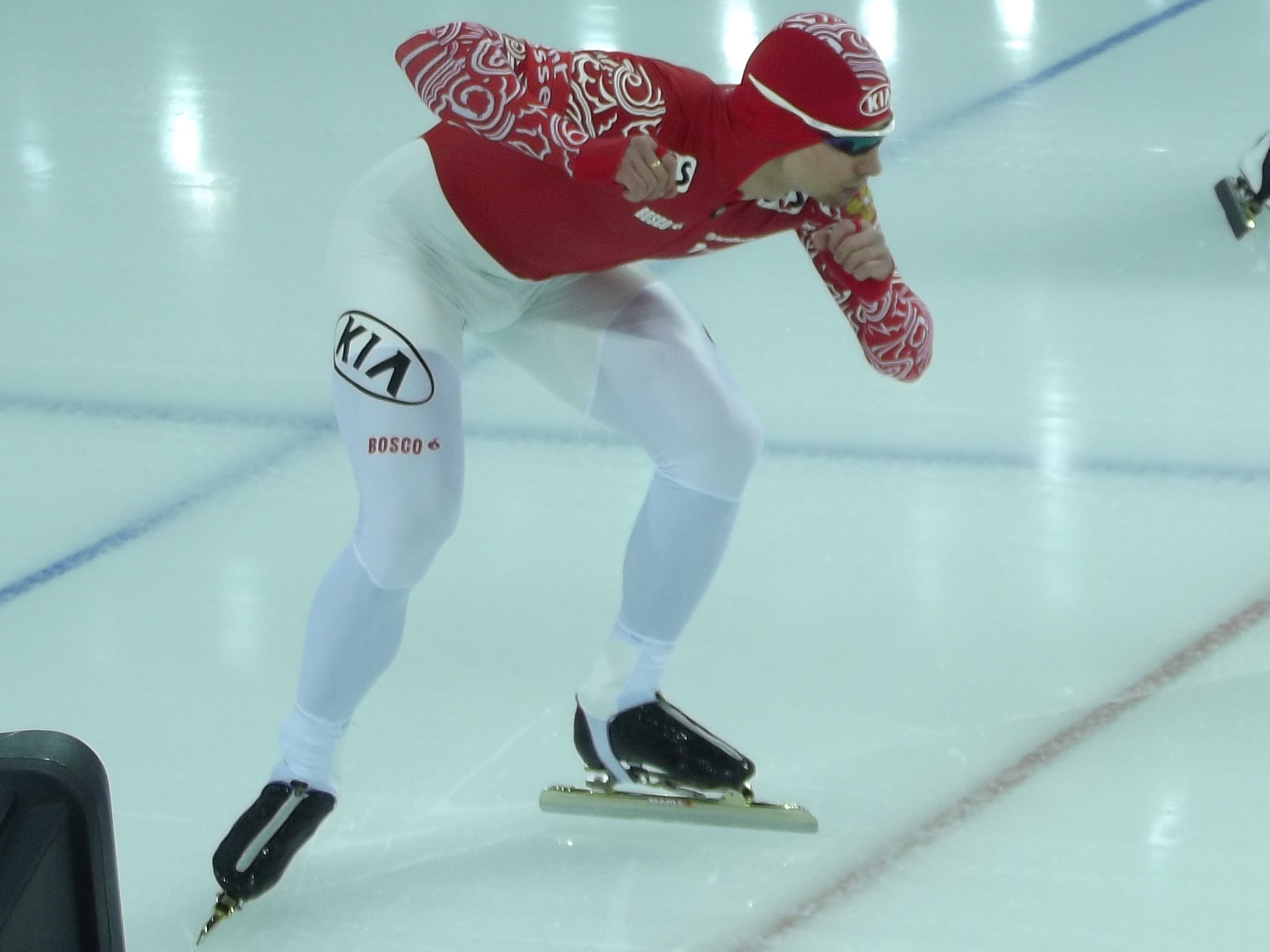
Denis Koval (2013)

Denis Anatolyevich Koval (Russian: Денис Анатольевич Коваль; born 6 November 1991, in Irkutsk) is a Russian speed skater. He competed at the 2014 Winter Olympics in Sochi, in the 500 meters.
