= Ronald Mulder =

Dutch speed skater (born 1986)

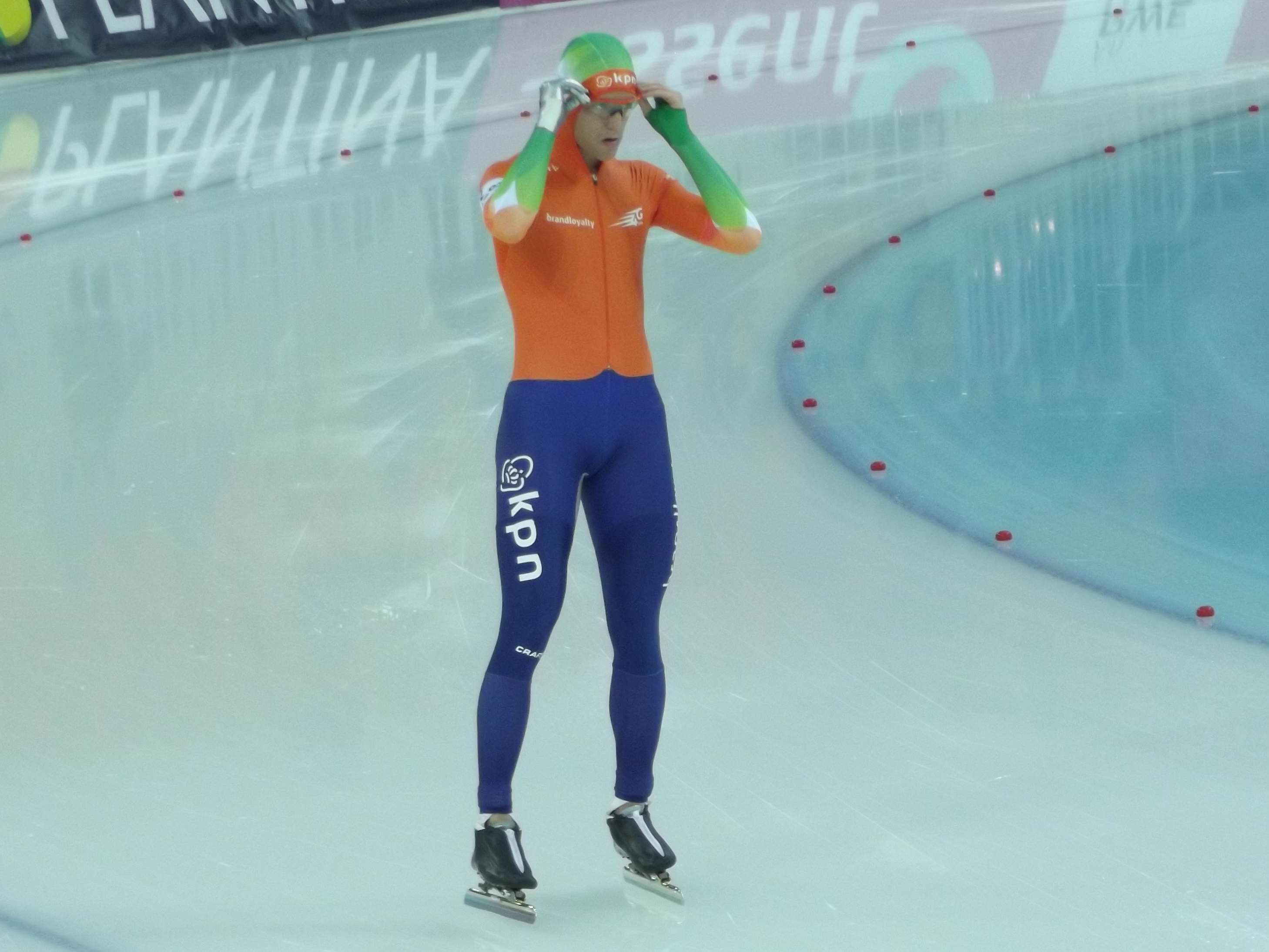
- Mulder in 2013

Personal information
- Nationality: Dutch
- Born: 27 February 1986 (age 40) Zwolle, Netherlands
- Height: 1.86 m (6 ft 1 in)
- Weight: 84 kg (185 lb)

Sport
- Country: Netherlands
- Sport: Speed skating
- Club: Team Reggeborgh
Medal record
Men's speed skating
Representing Netherlands
Olympic Games
Bronze medal – third place	2014 Sochi	500 m
World Single Distances Championships
Gold medal – first place	2019 Inzell	Team sprint
European Championships
Gold medal – first place	2018 Kolomna	500 m

Ronald Mulder (born 27 February 1986) is a Dutch speed skater. He won bronze in the men's 500 metres event at the 2014 Winter Olympics in Sochi, Russia, and finished sixth in the men's 500 metres event at the 2012 World Single Distance Championships. His twin brother, Michel Mulder, is also a speed skater. Both competed in the 2017 World Games in Wrocław, Poland representing the Netherlands in 500 metres sprint and 200 metres time trial. He competed in the 2018 Winter Olympics in the men's 500 metres event, finishing in 7th place.

In 2023, he took part in the television show Het Onbekende.

== Personal records ==
Personal records
Men's speed skating
Event	Result	Date	Location	Notes
500 m	34.08	26 February 2017	Olympic Oval, Calgary	Current Dutch record
1000 m	1:08.46	13 December 2009	Utah Olympic Oval, Salt Lake City	
1500 m	1:53.98	11 August 2012	Vikingskipet, Hamar	
3000 m	4:22.82	13 January 2008	Thialf, Heerenveen	
5000 m	8:08.12	12 February 2004	De Vechtsebanen, Utrecht	

== See also ==
- List of Olympic medalist families
