= Artur Waś =

Polish speed skater

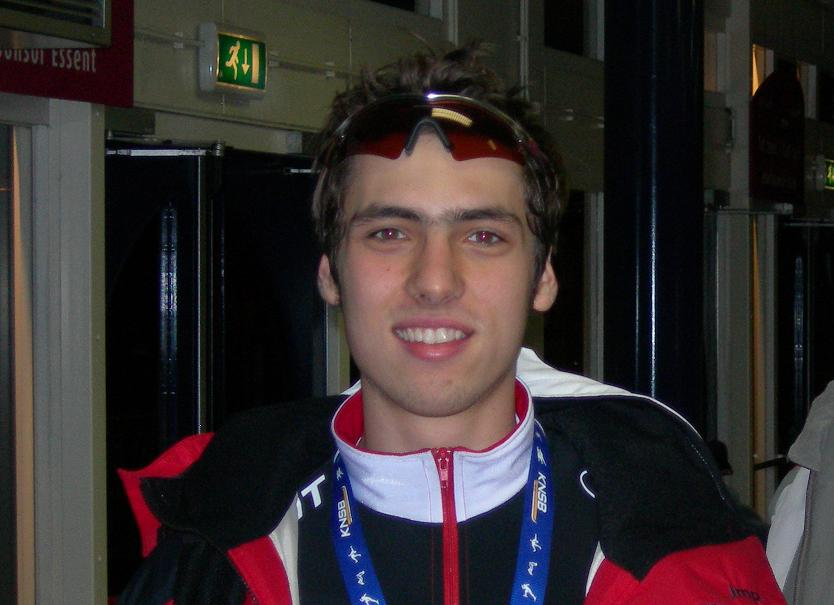
Artur Waś

Artur Waś (born 27 March 1986 in Warsaw) is a Polish speed skater. He competed at the 2014 Winter Olympics in Sochi, in the 500 meters. He is also known to produce Drum and bass under the alias "Voima".
