= Keiichiro Nagashima =

Japanese speed skater

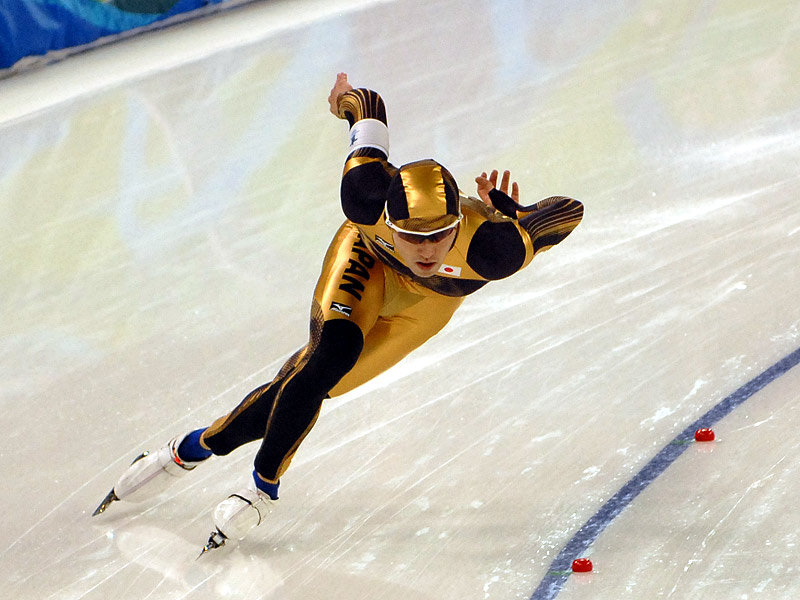
- Nagashima at the 2010 Olympics

Personal information
- Born: 20 April 1982 (age 44) Ikeda, Hokkaido
- Employer: Nidec Sankyo
- Height: 1.74 m (5 ft 9 in)
- Weight: 70 kg (154 lb)

Sport
- Country: Japan
- Sport: Speed skating
Medal record
Men's speed skating
Representing Japan
Olympic Games
Silver medal – second place	2010 Vancouver	500 m
World Sprint Championships
Silver medal – second place	2009 Moscow	Sprint
Bronze medal – third place	2010 Obihiro	Sprint
Asian Winter Games
Bronze medal – third place	2011 Astana/Almaty	500 m
- Updated on 7 February 2014

Keiichiro Nagashima (長島 圭一郎, Nagashima Keiichirō; born 20 April 1982) is a Japanese long track speed skater specialising in the sprint distances 500 and 1000 metres. Nagashima has won two World Cup races and has three Japanese domestic titles. He is a member of the Nidec Sankyo speed skating team.

== Career ==
Nagashima spent three years competing in domestic Japanese races before getting selected for the World Cup sprint event in Nagano in December 2004. Before that, he had several fourth-place finishes in Japanese Championships, getting pipped to the third place in the October 2004 2 × 500 metre Championship by then world-record holder Hiroyasu Shimizu.

The Nagano races were the first sprint races of the season, and in his debut race Nagashima finished third, 0.05 seconds behind joint winners Shimizu and Jeremy Wotherspoon. However, he failed to keep up this performance in the rest of the season's races; his best placing in the other races was 13th in Erfurt, and though he was not relegated to the B division on 500 metres, he finished 18th in the overall World Cup and did not qualify for the World Single Distance Championships. He finished seventh in the 100 metre World Cup, however, after taking fifth place in Heerenveen. During this season, Nagashima also won the 500 metres at the Universiade in Innsbruck.

Nagashima started the 2006 season by winning his first domestic medal, taking bronze at the Japanese 2 × 500 championships, 0.610 points behind Joji Kato. Once more Nagashima was selected for the World Cup circuit, finishing in the top ten four times. Nagashima went home in December, forgoing the sprint World Cup race in Inzell like many of his compatriots, to win the Japanese sprint championships held in the last weekend of December 2005, tallying 141.985 points to finish just over 0.05 points ahead of silver medallist Yusuke Imai. The 500-metre-record-holder and Japanese champion, Kato, did not participate. However, at the World Sprint Championships in Heerenveen a month later, Imai was well ahead of Nagashima; Nagashima finished 22nd in the overall classification and was not in the top ten on any distance. Nagashima did beat Kato and Shimizu, however.

Nagashima then travelled to Turin and the 2006 Winter Olympics, but failed to place in the top ten, ending 13th as the third best Japanese skater, nearly 1.5 points behind winner Joey Cheek on the 2 × 500 metres. On the 1,000 metres, he was 32nd out of 37 finishers, nearly three seconds behind the winner. He finished the season by placing 18th in the final World Cup race, thus ending 14th in the overall 500 metre World Cup standings despite not turning up for the Inzell and Collalbo sprints.

The 2007 season started well for Nagashima, who won four important races. First, he won both the 2 × 500 and the 1000 metre events at the Japanese Single Distance Championships in October, thus allowing him to go to Thialf, Heerenveen, for the opening World Cup races. He won both 500 metre races, thus leading the World Cup overall standings, though his times (35.10 and 35.24) were well behind the track record at the time (34.82, Lee Kang-seok). He also achieved his best placing on the 1000 metres, with 12th in the first race.

He represented Japan at the 2010 Winter Olympics, and he won silver at the men's 500 metres.
