= Ryohei Haga =

Japanese speed skater

Personal information
- Born: 17 September 1988 (age 37) Obihiro, Japan

Sport
- Country: Japan
- Sport: Speed skating

Ryohei Haga (羽賀 亮平, Haga Ryōhei; born 17 September 1988) is a Japanese speed skater who is specialized in the sprint distances.

== Career ==
Haga competed in the 1000m event at the 2010 Winter Olympics in Vancouver and finished in 29th place.

At the first competition weekend of the 2018–19 ISU Speed Skating World Cup in Obihiro, Japan in March he finished second in the second 500m event.

== Personal records ==
Personal records
Men's speed skating
Event	Result	Date	Location	Notes
500 m	34.43	26 January 2013	Utah Olympic Oval, Salt Lake City	
1000 m	1:08.43	2 December 2017	Olympic Oval, Calgary	
1500 m	1:59.31	15 March 2007	Olympic Oval, Calgary	
