= Artyom Kuznetsov =

Russian speed skater (born 1987)

Personal information
- Born: 14 November 1987 (age 38) Yartsevo, Soviet Union
- Height: 177 cm (5 ft 10 in)
- Weight: 78 kg (172 lb)

Sport
- Country: Russia
- Sport: Speed skating
Medal record
European Championships
Bronze medal – third place	2019 Collalbo	500 m

Artyom Aleksandrovich Kuznetsov (Russian: Артём Александрович Кузнецов; born 14 November 1987) is a Russian speed skater. He competed at the 2014 Winter Olympics in Sochi, in the 500 meters finishing 19th overall with a best time of 35.14 seconds. He received a gold medal in race 1 for his 34.85 seconds time on November 30, 2013, and a bronze medal in race 2 for his 34.92 seconds time on December 1, 2013, at the ISU 2013-14 Speed Skating World Cup 3 in Astana, Kazakhstan. He competes with Cherepovets Dynamo in Vologda Oblast.

In December 2017, he was one of eleven Russian athletes who were banned for life from the Olympics by the International Olympic Committee, after doping offences at the 2014 Winter Olympics.
