= Nico Ihle =

German speed skater (born 1985)

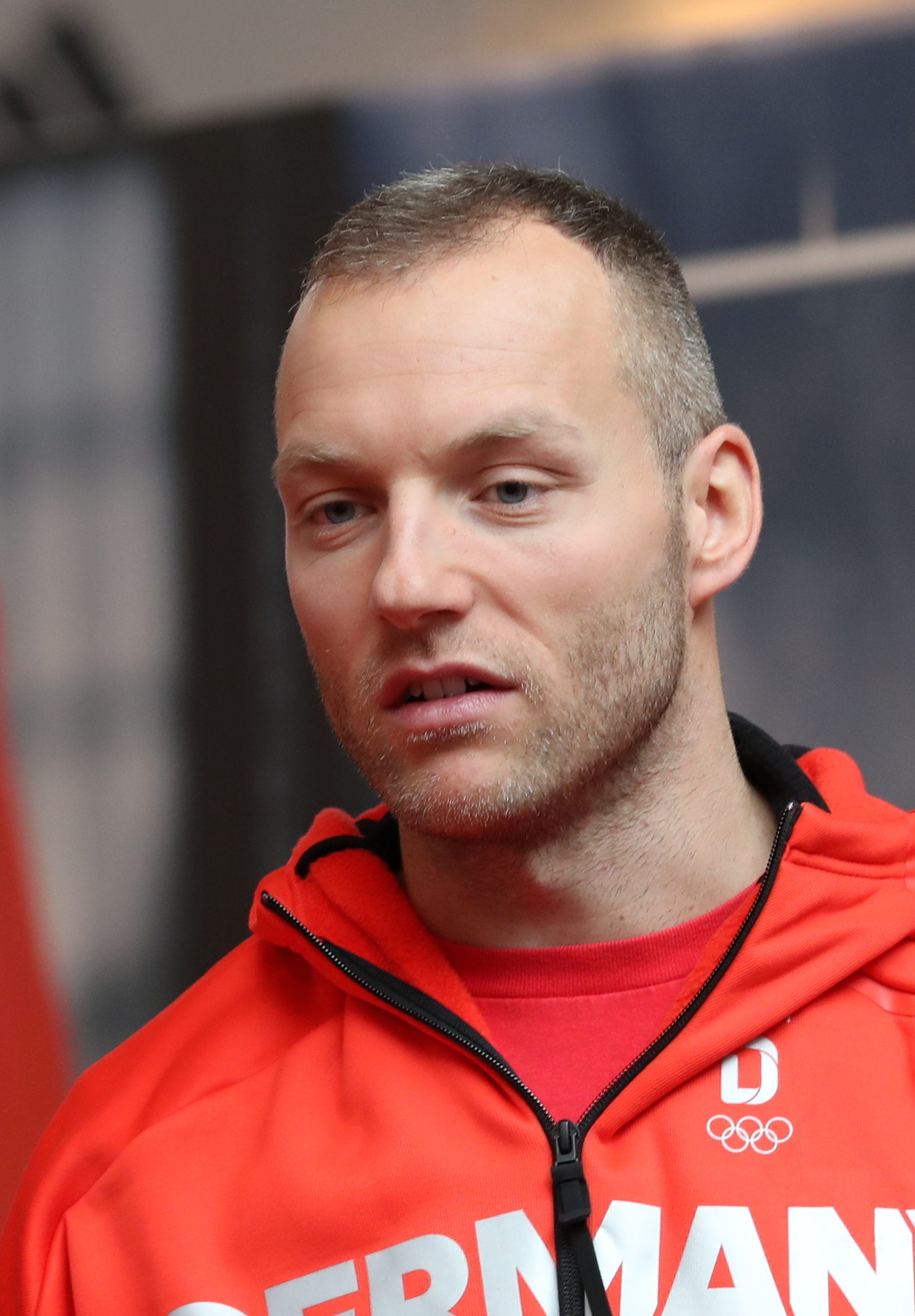
- Ihle in 2018

Medal record

Men's speed skating

Representing Germany

World Single Distance Championships
Silver medal – second place	2017 Gangneung	500 m

European Sprint Championships
Bronze medal – third place	2017 Heerenveen	Sprint

Nico Ihle (born 2 December 1985 in Karl-Marx-Stadt) (since 1990 renamed Chemnitz) is a German speed skater. He competed at the 2014 Winter Olympics in Sochi, in the 500 meters and 1000 meters events and also at the 2018 Winter Olympics in Pyeongchang, South Korea.

== Speed skating ==
=== Personal records ===
Event	Result	Date	Location	Notes
500 m	34.35	8 December 2017	Utah Olympic Oval, Salt Lake City	
1000 m	1:07.06	9 March 2019	Utah Olympic Oval, Salt Lake City	
1500 m	1:50.65	26 October 2019	Max Aicher Arena, Inzell	
3000 m	4:04.94	22 July 2005	Sportforum Hohenschönhausen, Berlin	
5000 m	7:11.88	29 February 2005	de:Gunda-Niemann-Stirnemann-Halle, Erfurt	

=== German national records held by Ihle ===
Event	Result	Date	Location
500 m	34.35	8 December 2017	Utah Olympic Oval, Salt Lake City
2 X 500 m samalog	70.10	10 February 2014	Adler Arena Skating Center, Sochi, Russia
Team sprint	1:20.42	22 November 2015	Utah Olympic Oval, Salt Lake City
Sprint combination	148.983	25–26 February 2017	Olympic Oval, Calgary

== Tournament overview ==
Season	German Championships Single Distances	European Championships Sprint	World Championships Sprint	World Championships Single Distances	Olympic Games	World Cup GWC	World Championships Allround Junior
2004–05							SEINÄJOKI 8th 500m 22nd 3000m 32nd 1500m 15th 5000m 18th overall
2005–06							
2006–07						32nd 500m 47th 1000m 70th GWC	
2007–08	(gold) 500m 10th 1000m		THIALF 25th 500m 29th 1000m 24th 500m 29th1000m 25th overall	SEOUL 23rd 500m[1] 24th 500m[2] 22nd overall 500m		36th 500m 74th GWC	
2008–09	(silver) 500m (bronze) 1000m		MOSCOW 18th 500m 25th1000m 18th 500m 19th 1000m 21st overall			29th 500m 36th 1000m 62nd GWC	
2009–10	(gold) 500m[1] (gold) 500m[2] (silver) 1000m		OBIHIRO 11th 500m 15th 1000m 16th 500m 15th 500m 13th overall		VANCOUVER 19th 500m[1] 18th 500m[2] 18th overall 500m 25th 1000m	19th 500m 20th 1000m 31st GWC	
2010–11	(silver) 500m[1] (gold) 500m[2] (bronze) 1000m		THIALF 6th 500m 9th 1000m 15th 500m 16th 1000m 10th overall	NAGANO 14th 500m[1] 10th 500m[2] 13th overall 500m 18th 1000m		11th 500m 9th 1000m 13th GWC	
2011–12	(silver) 500m[1] (silver) 500m[2] (silver) 1000m					42nd 500m 111th GWC	
2012–13	(silver) 500m[1] (silver) 500m[2] (silver) 1000m		SALT LAKE CITY 19th 500m 17th 1000m 11th 500m 12th 1000m 10th overall	SOCHI 18th 500[1] 14th 500[2] 15th overall 500m 15th 1000m		24th 500m 15th 1000m 43rd GWC	
2013–14	(gold) 500m[1} (gold) 500m[2] (bronze) 1000m				SOCHI 7th 500m[1] 9th 500m[2] 8th 500m overall 4th 1000m	10th 500m 17th 1000m 10th GWC	
2014–15	(gold) 500m[1] (gold) 500m[2] (silver) 1000m		NUR–SULTAN 7th 500m (silver) 1000m DQ3 500m	THIALF 15th 500m[1] 14th 500m[2] 13th overall 500m 7th 1000m		5th 500m (bronze) 1000m 4th GWC	
2015–16	(gold) 500m[1] (gold) 500m[2] (gold) 1000m		SEOUL 5th 500m (bronze) 1000m 13th 500m 6th 1000m 4th overall	KOLOMNA 15th 1000m		29th 500m 13th 1000m 46th GWC	
2016–17	(gold) 500m[1] (gold) 500m[2] (silver) 1000m	THIALF (bronze) 500m 4th 1000m 8th 500m (silver) 1000m (bronze) overall	CALGARY 5th 500m 5th 1000m 22nd 500m 5th 1000m 8th overall	GANGNEUNG (silver) 500m 4th 1000m		7th 500m 5th 1000m 7th GWC	
2017–18	(gold) 500m (silver) 1000m		CHANGCHUM 9th 500m 5th 1000m 7th 500m (silver) 1000m 4th overall		GANGNEUNG 8th 500m 8th 1000m	11th 500m 8th 1000m 10th GWC	
2018–19	(gold) 500m DQ 1000m	COLLALBO 11th 500m 4th 1000m 7th 500m (bronze) 1000m 5th overall	THIALF 7th 500m 7th 1000m 10th 500m 4th 1000m 7th overall	INZELL 11th 500m 8th 1000m 4th Team sprint		18th 500m 6th 1000m 25th GWC	
2019–20	(silver) 500m (gold) 1000m		HAMAR 13th 500m 9th 1000m 13th 500m 9th 1000m 10th overall	SALT LAKE CITY 18th 500m 7th 1000m		26th 500m 10th 1000m 12th Team sprint	

source GWC:

source German data:

== World Cup overview ==
Season	500 meter													
2005–2006	38th	37th	21st(b)	21st(b)	22nd(b)	20th(b)	16th	19th	14th(b)	10th(b)	–	–		
2006–2007	6th(b)	3rd(b)	9th(b)	8th(b)	14th(b)	13th(b)	6th(b)	6th(b)	7th(b)	2nd(b)	–	–		
2007–2008	21st	24th	DQ(b)	10th(b)	15th(b)	8th(b)	7th(b)	4th(b)	8th(b)	7th(b)	4th(b)	6th(b)		
2008–2009	8th(b)	9th(b)	4th(b)	13th(b)	14th(b)	8th(b)	3rd(b)	7th(b)	3rd(b)	7th(b)	4th(b)	7th(b)	3rd(b)	–
2009–2010	6th(b)	5th(b)	16th(b)	6th(b)	8th(b)	6th(b)	4th(b)	3rd(b)	12th	12th	10th	7th		
2010–2011	5th	10th	7th	19th	13th	16th	11th	15th	7th	4th	17th	12th		
2011–2012	4th(b)	19th(b)	–	–	–	–	–	–	–	–	–	–		
2012–2013	8th(b)	9th(b	2nd(b)	8th(b)	18th	20th	6th	3rd(b)	1st(b)	–	–	–		
2013–2014	7th(b)	16(b)	13th(b)	2nd(b)	15th	16th	13th	10th	3rd	2nd	4th	4th		
2014–2015	5th	11th	4th	7th	5th	8th	DQ	9th	3rd	3rd	8th	4th		
2015–2016	17th	DQ	13th(b)	24(b)	5th(b)	15th(b)	3rd(b)	18th	7th(b)	13(b)	–	–		
2016–2017	5th(b)	4th(b)	1st place, gold medalist(s)	12th	18th	11th	1st place, gold medalist(s)	8th	6th	11th				
2017–2018	2nd place, silver medalist(s)	15th	18th	16th	18th	7th	18th	5th	5th	11th	10th			
2018–2019	5th	17th	8th	11th	11th	16th	15th	10th	–	–	–			
2019–2020	10th(b)	7th(b)	2nd(b)	17th	14th(b)	–	–							

Season	1000 meter											
2005–2006												
2006–2007	–	–	14th(b)	11th(b)	8th(b)	8th(b)	4th(b)	–	–	–		
2007–2008												
2008–2009	20th(b)	–	5th(b)	3rd(b)	3rd(b)	4th(b)	–	–	DNF(b)	–		
2009–2010	16th	20th	18th	7th	16th	17th	16th					
2010–2011	1st(b)	7th	10th	4th	10th	8th	6th	18th				
2011–2012	4th(b)	19th(b)	–	–	–	–	–	–	–	–	–	–
2012–2013	5th(b)	10th	11th	19th	17th	10th	15th	3rd place, bronze medalist(s)	–			
2013–2014	5th(b)	DQ	6th(b)	8th	8th	–						
2014–2015	10th	8th	1st place, gold medalist(s)	9th	3rd place, bronze medalist(s)	4th	5th					
2015–2016	17th	DQ(b)	DQ(b)	2nd(b)	10th	10th	6th					
2016–2017	1st(b)	5th	4th	11th	8th	3rd place, bronze medalist(s)	3rd place, bronze medalist(s)					
2017–2018	DQ	1st(b)	15th	13th	5th	4th	4th					
2018–2019	8th	9th	8th	6th	13th	6th	7th					
2019–2020	13th	5th	12th	11th	10th							

- – = Did not participate
- (b) = Division B
- DQ = Disqualified
- DNF = Did not finish
- GWC = Grand World Cup
