= Yūya Oikawa =

Japanese speed skater (born 1981)

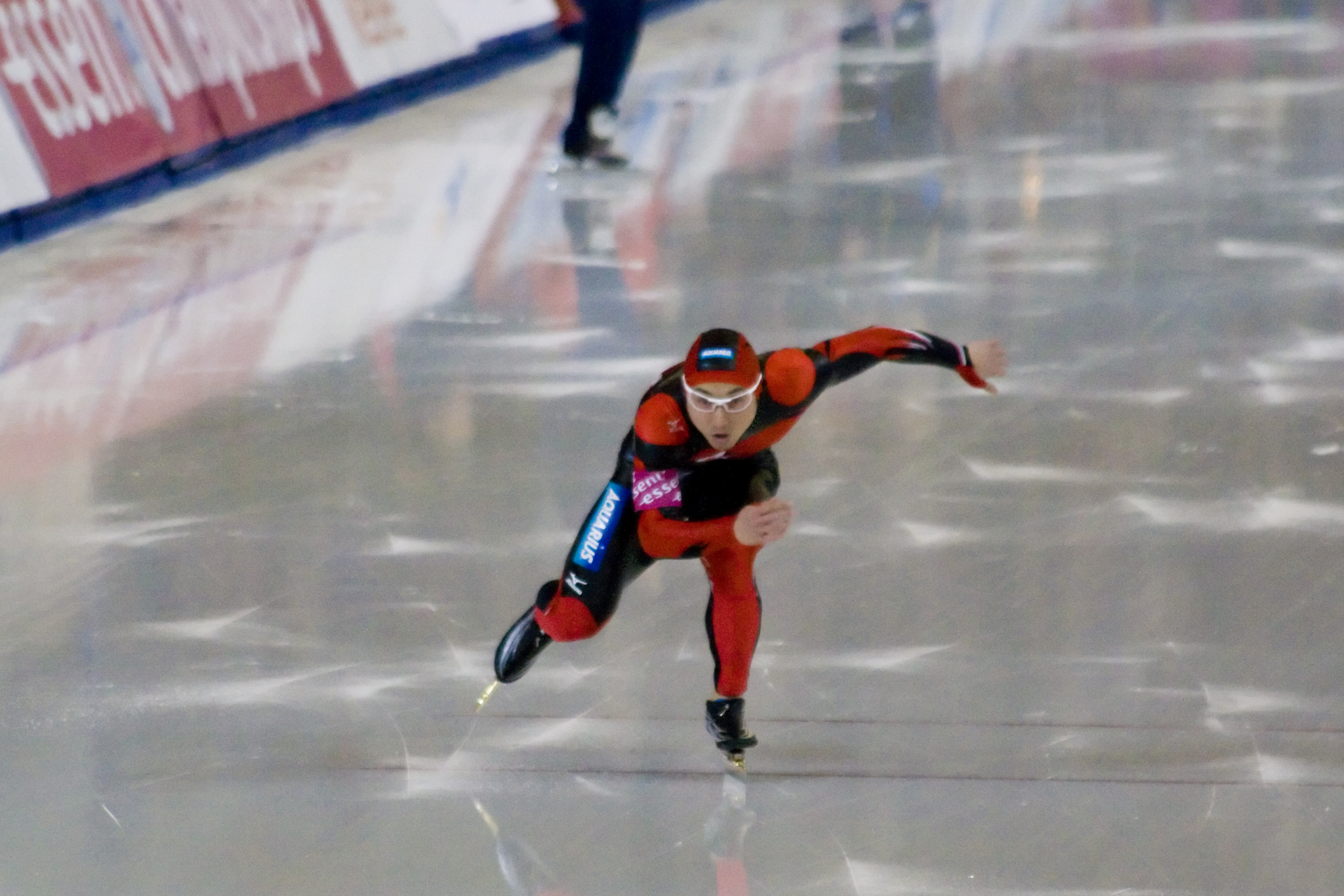
- Oikawa in 2009

Personal information
- Born: 16 January 1981 (age 45) Ikeda, Hokkaido
- Height: 1.71 m (5 ft 7 in)
- Weight: 70 kg (154 lb)

Sport
- Country: Japan
- Sport: Speed skating
Medal record
Men's speed skating
Representing Japan
World Championships
Silver medal – second place	2007 Salt Lake City	500 m
Asian Games
Gold medal – first place	2007 Changchun	100 m
Bronze medal – third place	2007 Changchun	500 m

Yūya Oikawa (及川 佑, Oikawa Yūya) (born 16 January 1981) is a Japanese speed skater. He competed in the 500 meter speed skating events in the 2006, 2010, and 2014 Winter Olympics.
