= Tucker Fredricks =

American speed skater

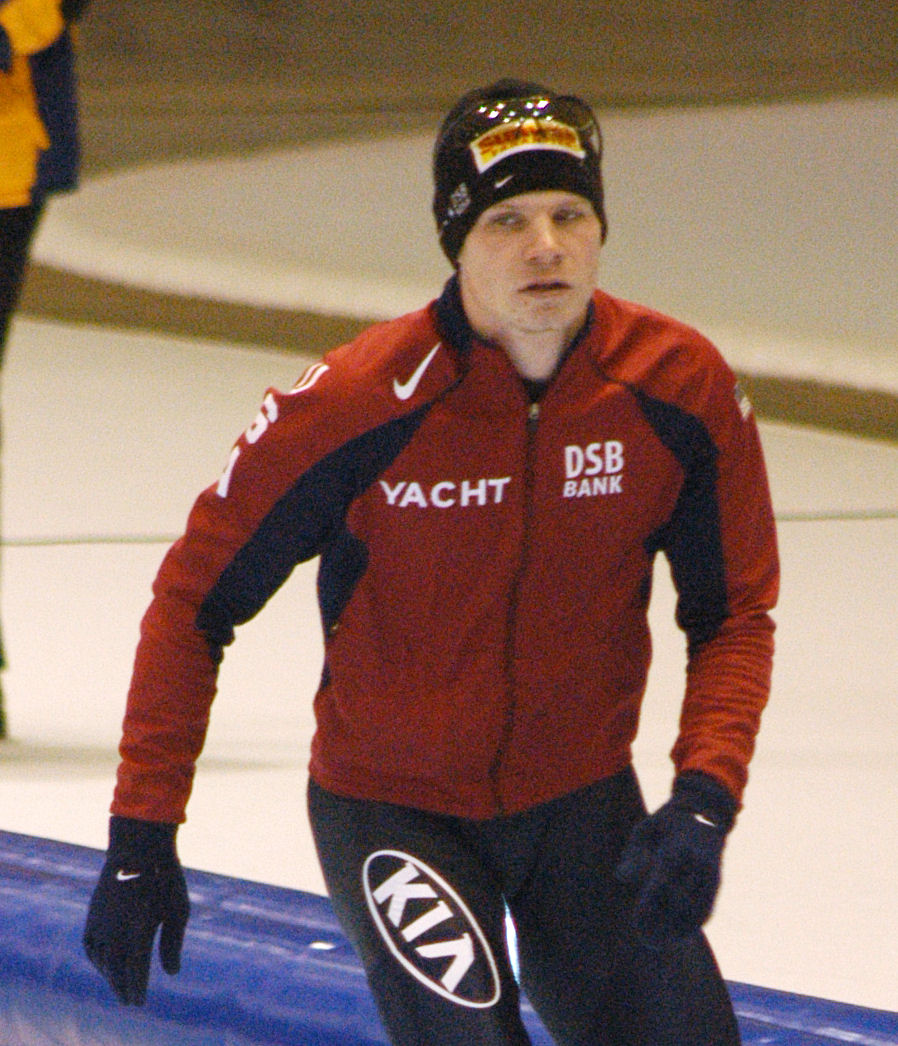
- Fredricks in February 2008 in Heerenveen

Personal information
- Full name: Tucker Daniel Fredricks
- Born: April 16, 1984 (age 41); Janesville, Wisconsin, U.S.
- Height: 5 ft 6 in (168 cm)

Sport
- Country: United States
- Sport: Speed skating

Tucker Daniel Fredricks (born April 16, 1984) is an American speed skater and the former US record holder in the 500 meter event. He competed at the 2006, 2010, and 2014 Winter Olympics.

Fredricks was born in Janesville, Wisconsin, where he graduated in 2002 from Joseph A. Craig High School. He began skating in 1994 when a friend of his father took him skating in lieu of playing hockey. He considers his greatest accomplishment to be winning the gold medal in 500m at the 2003 World Junior Championships.

On November 17, 2007, at the World Cup Race in Calgary, Alberta, Canada, Fredricks beat the previous American 500m record (34.42) which was originally held by 2002 Olympic gold medalist Casey Fitzrandolph, with a time of 34.31.

== Career wins ==
- 1st, 500m 2003 World Junior Speedskating Championships
- 3rd, 500m 2002 World Junior Speedskating Championships
- 1st, overall 2002 U.S. Junior Speedskating Championships
- 1st, overall 2003 U.S. Junior Speedskating Championships
- 1st, overall 2003 U.S. Junior Speedskating Championships
- 25th, 2006 Olympic Winter Games, Men’s 500m
- 12th, 2010 Olympic Winter Games, Men’s 500m (World Cup overall 500m champion)
- 26th, 2014 Olympic Winter Games, Men’s 500m

== Current record ==
Personal records
Men's speed skating
Event	Result	Date	Location	Notes
500 m	34.31	November 17, 2007	Calgary, Alberta, Canada	American record
500 m x 2	68.98	November 17, 2007	Calgary, Alberta, Canada	American record
1000 m	1:09.65	December 31, 2005	Salt Lake City, Utah	
1500 m	1:51.84	November 25, 2001	Calgary, Alberta, Canada	
3000 m	4:02.39	November 24, 2001	Calgary, Alberta, Canada	

== Highlights ==
Fredericks has been a World Cup 500m medalist winner 30 times (11 times gold, six times silver and 13 times bronze). In addition, in 2007 he won the bronze for the World Single Distance Championships, and was the World Cup overall 500m champion.
