= Dmitry Lobkov =

Russian speed skater

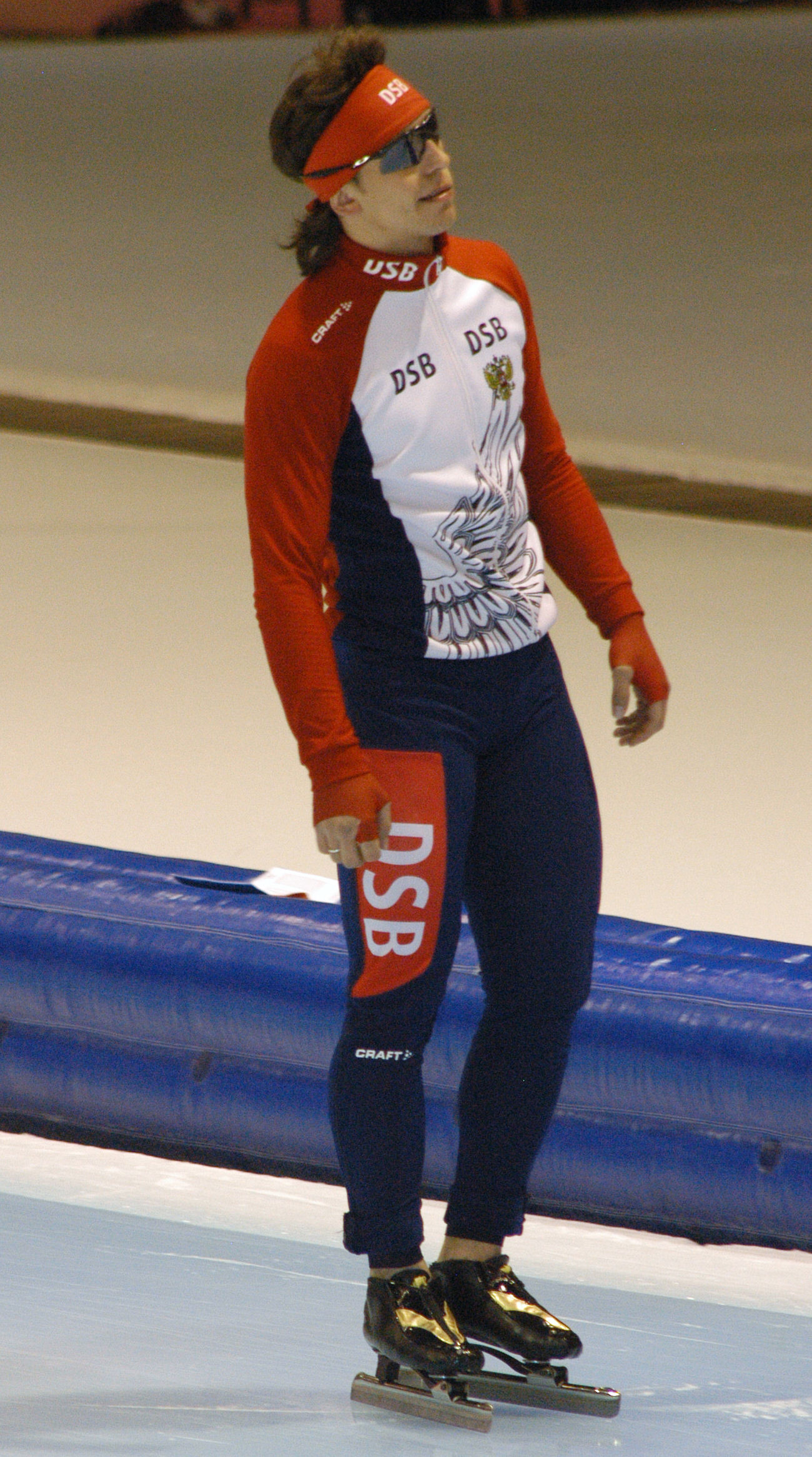
- Lobkov in 2008

Personal information
- Born: 2 February 1981 (age 45) Murom, Vladimir
- Height: 1.78 m (5 ft 10 in)
- Weight: 78 kg (172 lb)

Sport
- Country: Russia
- Sport: Speed skating
Medal record
World Championships
Silver medal – second place	2004 Seoul	500 m

Dmitry Vladimirovich Lobkov (Russian: Дмитрий Владимирович Лобков; born 2 February 1981 in Murom) is a Russian speedskater who specialises in the shortest distances, with the 500 metres being his favourite.

== Career ==
At the 2004 World Single Distance Speed Skating Championships in Seoul he achieved the silver medal at this distance, only allowing Jeremy Wotherspoon to be faster. He became Russian Sprint Champion three times in a row, and was, because of his recently shown progress, a favourite to win an Olympic medal in the 500 metres distance at the 2006 Winter Olympics in Turin. But in the summer of 2005, when his trainer Sergey Klevchenya organised a football-game, Lobkov got injured. His preparation for the Olympics was therefore too short. In his favourite 500 metres distance Lobkov ranked himself in fourteenth place.

On 12 January 2007 in Kolomna, Lobkov improved his 2003 personal best of 34.51 seconds, set at the Olympic rink in Salt Lake City, down to a record level of 34.35. At the time, only the two Japanese skaters Joji Kato (34.30) and Hiroyasu Shimizu (34.32) had ever skated faster. At the 2007 World Sprint Championship in Vikingskipet, Hamar, Lobkov won bronze and silver medals at the two 500-m races, and was ranked fourth overall, after Lee Kyou-hyuk, Pekka Koskela and Shani Davis. Lobkov missed the overall bronze medal by the slim margin of 0.060 points.
