= 2012–13 ISU Speed Skating World Cup – Men's 500 metres =

The 500 meters distance for men in the 2012–13 ISU Speed Skating World Cup was contested over 12 races on six occasions, out of a total of nine World Cup occasions for the season, with the first occasion taking place in Heerenveen, Netherlands, on 16–18 November 2012, and the final occasion also taking place in Heerenveen on 8–10 March 2013.

Jan Smeekens of the Netherlands won the cup, while Joji Kato of Japan came second, and Michel Mulder of the Netherlands came third. The defending champion, Mo Tae-bum of South Korea, ended up in seventh place.

== Top three ==
Medal	Athlete	Points	Previous season
Gold	(Netherlands) Jan Smeekens	1130	4th
Silver	(Japan) Joji Kato	896	5th
Bronze	(Netherlands) Michel Mulder	665	6th

== Race medallists ==
Occasion #	Location	Date	Gold	Time	Silver	Time	Bronze	Time	Report
1	Heerenveen, Netherlands	17 November	Pekka Koskela; Finland	34.96	Artur Waś; Poland	34.98	Jan Smeekens; Netherlands	35.07	
1	Heerenveen, Netherlands	18 November	Joji Kato; Japan	34.98	Jan Smeekens; Netherlands	35.04	Mo Tae-bum; South Korea	35.15	
4	Nagano, Japan	8 December	Pekka Koskela; Finland	34.64	Michel Mulder; Netherlands	34.95	Tucker Fredricks; United States	35.10	
4	Nagano, Japan	9 December	Keiichiro Nagashima; Japan	35.14	Gilmore Junio; Canada	35.16	Jan Smeekens; Netherlands	35.18	
5	Harbin, China	15 December	Jan Smeekens; Netherlands	35.15	Michel Mulder; Netherlands	35.20	Joji Kato; Japan	35.22	
5	Harbin, China	16 December	Joji Kato; Japan	34.94	Ronald Mulder; Netherlands	35.21	Jan Smeekens; Netherlands	35.27	
6	Calgary, Alberta, Canada	19 January	Jan Smeekens; Netherlands	34.32	Pekka Koskela; Finland	34.361	Jamie Gregg; Canada	34.369	
6	Calgary, Alberta, Canada	20 January	Jan Smeekens; Netherlands	34.39	Joji Kato; Japan	34.44	Michel Mulder; Netherlands	34.55	
8	Erfurt, Germany	2 March	Jan Smeekens; Netherlands	35.06	Joji Kato; Japan	35.16	Ronald Mulder; Netherlands	35.28	
8	Erfurt, Germany	3 March	Jan Smeekens; Netherlands	34.96	Joji Kato; Japan	35.05	Ronald Mulder; Netherlands	35.28	
9	Heerenveen, Netherlands	8 March	Jan Smeekens; Netherlands	34.84	Jamie Gregg; Canada	34.96	Ronald Mulder; Netherlands	35.04	
9	Heerenveen, Netherlands	10 March	Jan Smeekens; Netherlands	34.83	Joji Kato; Japan	34.92	Michel Mulder; Netherlands	34.97	

== Standings ==
Standings as of 10 March 2013 (end of the season).

#	Name	Nat.	HVN1	HVN2	NAG1	NAG2	HAR1	HAR2	CAL1	CAL2	ERF1	ERF2	HVN3	HVN4	Total
1	Jan Smeekens	(Netherlands)	70	80	40	70	100	70	100	100	100	100	150	150	1130
2	Joji Kato	(Japan)	50	100	45	21	70	100	60	80	80	80	90	120	896
3	Michel Mulder	(Netherlands)	45	6	80	60	80	36	18	70	40	50	75	105	665
4	Ronald Mulder	(Netherlands)	18	16	12	24	60	80	50	45	70	70	105	90	640
5	Jamie Gregg	(Canada)	40	25	14	12	36	16	70	10	45	60	120	32	480
6	Keiichiro Nagashima	(Japan)	24	45	21	100	40	60	21	28	24	36	10	45	454
7	Mo Tae-bum	(South Korea)	60	70	50	50	21	24	12	40	–	–	24	75	426
8	Gilmore Junio	(Canada)	32	60	24	80	18	50	45	36	18	21	28	8	420
9	Yūya Oikawa	(Japan)	8	12	36	45	28	28	28	50	60	24	32	28	379
10	Pekka Koskela	(Finland)	100	0	100	4	–	–	80	60	–	–	–	–	344
11	Artur Waś	(Poland)	80	50	28	40	50	45	14	6	0	–	8	10	331
12	Dmitry Lobkov	(Russia)	21	32	60	16	5	12	36	21	36	45	18	18	320
13	Tucker Fredricks	(United States)	11	19	70	18	–	–	16	24	28	28	45	36	295
14	Hein Otterspeer	(Netherlands)	40	18	32	14	32	18	24	12	32	18	12	40	292
15	Mika Poutala	(Finland)	16	21	18	36	14	21	40	16	50	32	–	–	264
16	Lee Kang-seok	(South Korea)	14	0	28	25	50	40	32	–	–	–	36	24	249
17	Denis Koval	(Russia)	–	–	8	4	11	15	25	36	21	40	40	12	212
18	Ryohei Haga	(Japan)	26	24	10	32	24	4	8	14	6	8	14	21	201
19	Daniel Greig	(Australia)	0	25	8	8	25	32	6	18	10	14	16	16	178
20	Kjeld Nuis	(Netherlands)	14	36	–	–	16	8	–	19	16	16	21	–	146
21	Aleksey Yesin	(Russia)	0	8	4	25	10	10	8	–	15	25	5	6	116
22	Alex Boisvert-Lacroix	(Canada)	32	28	6	5	6	6	10	5	8	6	–	–	112
23	Laurent Dubreuil	(Canada)	19	6	–	–	–	–	11	25	14	10	6	14	105
24	Nico Ihle	(Germany)	2	1	19	2	8	5	6	15	25	–	–	–	83
25	Lee Kyou-hyuk	(South Korea)	10	14	16	10	12	14	–	–	–	–	–	–	76
26	Kim Sung-kyu	(South Korea)	8	0	11	8	19	19	0	8	–	–	–	–	73
27	Espen-Aarnes Hvammen	(Norway)	15	0	0	1	4	11	0	2	4	19	–	–	56
28	Wang Nan	(China)	4	11	0	0	15	25	–	–	–	–	–	–	55
29	Mirko Giacomo Nenzi	(Italy)	0	–	0	19	–	–	0	6	11	19	–	–	55
30	William Dutton	(Canada)	1	0	0	0	0	0	19	8	12	12	–	–	52
31	Samuel Schwarz	(Germany)	0	2	15	0	6	–	0	0	19	–	–	–	42
32	Kim Yeong-ho	(South Korea)	6	15	5	6	8	0	0	–	–	–	–	–	40
33	Mitchell Whitmore	(United States)	6	8	1	0	–	–	4	11	0	0	–	–	30
34	Guo Qiang	(China)	–	–	–	–	2	6	–	–	8	8	–	–	24
35	Artyom Kuznetsov	(Russia)	0	0	2	15	0	0	2	1	2	0	–	–	22
36	Denny Ihle	(Germany)	0	0	0	0	0	0	15	4	0	1	–	–	20
37	Igor Bogolubsky	(Russia)	0	0	0	0	0	8	0	0	0	11	–	–	19
38	Viktor Gluschenko	(Kazakhstan)	0	4	0	11	0	2	0	0	–	–	–	–	17
39	Tsubasa Hasegawa	(Japan)	5	10	0	0	0	1	–	–	–	–	–	–	16
40	Jesper Hospes	(Netherlands)	–	–	6	6	–	–	–	–	–	–	–	–	12
41	Roman Krech	(Kazakhstan)	–	–	–	–	–	–	–	–	6	4	–	–	10
42	Jonathan Garcia	(United States)	–	–	0	0	–	–	–	–	0	6	–	–	6
43	Liu Fangyi	(China)	0	0	–	–	1	4	–	–	–	–	–	–	5
44	Han Jialiang	(China)	–	–	–	–	–	–	–	–	0	2	–	–	2
45	Shunsuke Nakamura	(Japan)	–	–	–	–	–	–	1	0	–	–	–	–	1
45	Artur Nogal	(Poland)	0	0	0	0	–	0	0	0	1	0	–	–	1
