= 2012–13 ISU Speed Skating World Cup – Men's 1000 metres =

The 1000 meters distance for men in the 2012–13 ISU Speed Skating World Cup was contested over nine races on six occasions, out of a total of nine World Cup occasions for the season, with the first occasion taking place in Heerenveen, Netherlands, on 16–18 November 2012, and the final occasion also taking place in Heerenveen on 8–10 March 2013.

Kjeld Nuis of the Netherlands won the cup, while the defending champion, Shani Davis of the United States, came second, and Hein Otterspeer of the Netherlands came third.

== Top three ==
Medal	Athlete	Points	Previous season
Gold	(Netherlands) Kjeld Nuis	587	3rd
Silver	(United States) Shani Davis	546	1st
Bronze	(Netherlands) Hein Otterspeer	507	16th

== Race medallists ==
Occasion #	Location	Date	Gold	Time	Silver	Time	Bronze	Time	Report
1	Heerenveen, Netherlands	17 November	Denny Morrison; Canada	1:09.43	Pekka Koskela; Finland	1:09.51	Kjeld Nuis; Netherlands	1:09.53	
4	Nagano, Japan	8 December	Pekka Koskela; Finland	1:09.52	Samuel Schwarz; Germany	1:09.69	Lee Kyou-hyuk; South Korea	1:09.85	
4	Nagano, Japan	9 December	Hein Otterspeer; Netherlands	1:09.20	Denny Morrison; Canada	1:09.64	Kjeld Nuis; Netherlands	1:09.72	
5	Harbin, China	15 December	Shani Davis; United States	1:10.05	Hein Otterspeer; Netherlands	1:10.07	Samuel Schwarz; Germany	1:10.10	
5	Harbin, China	16 December	Samuel Schwarz; Germany	1:09.69	Shani Davis; United States	1:09.87	Hein Otterspeer; Netherlands	1:09.92	
6	Calgary, Alberta, Canada	19 January	Shani Davis; United States	1:07.49	Kjeld Nuis; Netherlands	1:07.64	Michel Mulder; Netherlands	1:07.87	
6	Calgary, Alberta, Canada	20 January	Hein Otterspeer; Netherlands	1:07.76	Shani Davis; United States	1:07.83	Samuel Schwarz; Germany	1:07.85	
8	Erfurt, Germany	2 March	Brian Hansen; United States	1:09.79	Stefan Groothuis; Netherlands	1:09.84	Dmitry Lobkov; Russia; Nico Ihle; Germany	1:10.18	
9	Heerenveen, Netherlands	9 March	Stefan Groothuis; Netherlands	1:08.91	Mark Tuitert; Netherlands	1:09.22	Kjeld Nuis; Netherlands	1:09.240	

== Standings ==
Standings as of 10 March 2013 (end of the season).

#	Name	Nat.	HVN1	NAG1	NAG2	HAR1	HAR2	CAL1	CAL2	ERF	HVN2	Total
1	Kjeld Nuis	(Netherlands)	70	50	70	60	60	80	60	32	105	587
2	Shani Davis	(United States)	–	–	60	100	80	100	80	36	90	546
3	Hein Otterspeer	(Netherlands)	50	10	100	80	70	45	100	24	28	507
4	Samuel Schwarz	(Germany)	28	80	36	70	100	21	70	40	32	477
5	Michel Mulder	(Netherlands)	–	25	40	40	45	70	50	21	75	366
6	Denny Morrison	(Canada)	100	45	80	50	50	–	–	–	–	325
7	Stefan Groothuis	(Netherlands)	–	–	–	–	–	40	36	80	150	306
8	Tyler Derraugh	(Canada)	6	60	32	–	–	60	40	50	36	284
9	Denis Kuzin	(Kazakhstan)	21	40	12	45	36	18	32	28	45	277
10	Aleksey Yesin	(Russia)	45	36	50	36	32	16	28	12	18	273
11	Pekka Koskela	(Finland)	80	100	0	–	–	36	14	–	–	230
12	Mark Tuitert	(Netherlands)	–	–	–	–	–	25	24	45	120	214
13	Mo Tae-bum	(South Korea)	15	16	21	18	5	50	45	–	40	210
14	Brian Hansen	(United States)	40	–	–	–	–	15	25	100	24	204
15	Nico Ihle	(Germany)	8	28	24	6	10	28	14	70	–	188
16	Lee Kyou-hyuk	(South Korea)	36	70	45	28	0	8	–	–	–	187
17	Jamie Gregg	(Canada)	–	32	28	24	16	32	18	6	21	177
18	Pim Schipper	(Netherlands)	60	24	14	32	28	–	–	–	–	158
19	Daniel Greig	(Australia)	2	8	25	14	21	14	21	16	14	135
20	Dmitry Lobkov	(Russia)	16	21	–	5	8	4	–	70	10	134
21	Mika Poutala	(Finland)	0	19	19	21	24	28	–	18	–	129
22	Sjoerd de Vries	(Netherlands)	32	–	–	16	40	–	–	–	–	88
23	Christoffer Fagerli Rukke	(Norway)	12	0	18	12	14	10	8	5	–	79
24	Espen Aarnes Hvammen	(Norway)	0	0	4	19	25	6	–	8	12	74
25	Haralds Silovs	(Latvia)	0	–	–	–	–	11	15	25	16	67
26	Jonathan Garcia	(United States)	14	18	10	–	–	0	0	14	–	56
27	Kim Yeong-ho	(South Korea)	4	15	8	10	18	0	–	–	–	55
28	Aleksandr Zhigin	(Kazakhstan)	0	0	2	15	8	5	10	11	–	51
29	Fyodor Mezentsev	(Kazakhstan)	24	0	16	–	–	0	0	10	–	50
30	Yevgeny Lalenkov	(Russia)	–	–	–	–	–	12	16	19	–	47
31	Mirko Giacomo Nenzi	(Italy)	0	6	15	–	–	0	11	15	–	47
32	Philippe Riopel	(Canada)	6	14	6	8	6	2	2	–	–	44
33	Zbigniew Bródka	(Poland)	–	–	–	–	–	19	19	–	–	38
34	Wang Nan	(China)	0	0	0	25	21	–	–	–	–	37
35	Benjamin Macé	(France)	18	–	–	–	–	8	4	6	–	36
36	Tommi Pulli	(Finland)	0	4	0	0	19	0	8	–	–	31
36	Laurent Dubreuil	(Canada)	19	–	–	–	–	6	6	–	–	31
38	Konrad Niedźwiedzki	(Poland)	25	–	–	–	–	–	–	–	–	25
39	Artyom Kuznetsov	(Russia)	5	12	8	0	0	–	0	0	–	25
40	Maciej Biega	(Poland)	1	0	0	11	4	0	0	2	–	18
41	Gilmore Junio	(Canada)	–	–	–	–	15	–	0	–	–	15
42	Igor Bogolubsky	(Russia)	0	0	1	8	6	0	0	0	–	15
43	Denis Koval	(Russia)	–	0	0	2	11	0	0	–	–	13
44	Mitchell Whitmore	(United States)	–	2	11	–	–	–	–	–	–	13
45	Taro Kondo	(Japan)	0	11	0	–	–	0	1	0	–	12
46	Trevor Marsicano	(United States)	11	–	–	–	–	–	–	–	–	11
47	Rhian Ket	(Netherlands)	10	–	–	–	–	–	–	–	–	10
48	Håvard Holmefjord Lorentzen	(Norway)	8	–	–	–	–	1	0	–	–	9
49	Espen Tveit	(Norway)	–	–	–	–	–	–	–	8	–	8
50	Daichi Yamanaka	(Japan)	–	1	6	–	–	–	–	–	–	7
51	Ryohei Haga	(Japan)	–	0	–	6	–	0	–	–	–	6
52	Mu Zhongsheng	(China)	–	0	0	4	1	0	0	–	–	5
53	Alexis Contin	(France)	0	–	–	–	–	0	0	4	–	4
54	Aleksandr Gluchshenko	(Kazakhstan)	–	–	–	1	2	–	–	–	–	3
55	Junya Miwa	(Japan)	–	–	–	–	–	–	–	1	–	1
