= 2012–13 ISU Speed Skating World Cup – Women's 1500 metres =

The 1500 meters distance for women in the 2012–13 ISU Speed Skating World Cup was contested over six races on six occasions, out of a total of nine World Cup occasions for the season, with the first occasion taking place in Heerenveen, Netherlands, on 16–18 November 2012, and the final occasion also taking place in Heerenveen on 8–10 March 2013.

Marrit Leenstra of the Netherlands won the cup, while the defending champion, Christine Nesbitt of Canada, came second, and Ireen Wüst of the Netherlands came third.

== Top three ==
Medal	Athlete	Points	Previous season
Gold	(Netherlands) Marrit Leenstra	411	3rd
Silver	(Canada) Christine Nesbitt	375	1st
Bronze	(Netherlands) Ireen Wüst	350	2nd

== Race medallists ==
Occasion #	Location	Date	Gold	Time	Silver	Time	Bronze	Time	Report
1	Heerenveen, Netherlands	17 November	Christine Nesbitt; Canada	1:56.35	Marrit Leenstra; Netherlands	1:56.42	Lotte van Beek; Netherlands	1:57.42	
2	Kolomna, Russia	24 November	Marrit Leenstra; Netherlands	1:55.03	Yekaterina Shikhova; Russia	1:55.52	Christine Nesbitt; Canada	1:56.16	
3	Astana, Kazachstan	2 December	Christine Nesbitt; Canada	1:57.18	Marrit Leenstra; Netherlands	1:57.29	Linda de Vries; Netherlands	1:57.30	
7	Inzell, Germany	9 February	Ireen Wüst; Netherlands	1:55.95	Diane Valkenburg; Netherlands	1:56.42	Yekaterina Shikhova; Russia	1:57.07	
8	Erfurt, Germany	2 March	Ireen Wüst; Netherlands	1:55.61	Diane Valkenburg; Netherlands	1:58.32	Marrit Leenstra; Netherlands	1:58.38	
9	Heerenveen, Netherlands	10 March	Ireen Wüst; Netherlands	1:54.67	Lotte van Beek; Netherlands	1:56.58	Christine Nesbitt; Canada	1:56.86	

== Standings ==
Standings as of 10 March 2013 (end of the season).

#	Name	Nat.	HVN1	KOL	AST	INZ	ERF	HVN2	Total
1	Marrit Leenstra	(Netherlands)	80	100	80	45	70	36	411
2	Christine Nesbitt	(Canada)	100	70	100	–	–	105	375
3	Ireen Wüst	(Netherlands)	–	–	–	100	100	150	350
4	Linda de Vries	(Netherlands)	0	25	70	60	50	75	280
5	Lotte van Beek	(Netherlands)	70	0	45	–	28	120	263
6	Diane Valkenburg	(Netherlands)	–	–	60	80	80	40	260
7	Yekaterina Shikhova	(Russia)	–	80	50	70	32	–	232
8	Yekaterina Lobysheva	(Russia)	24	40	18	50	40	28	200
9	Kali Christ	(Canada)	11	10	–	40	36	90	187
10	Martina Sáblíková	(Czech Republic)	50	60	36	–	–	32	178
11	Katarzyna Bachleda-Curuś	(Poland)	15	18	5	32	60	45	175
12	Ida Njåtun	(Norway)	36	24	28	36	14	24	162
13	Kim Bo-reum	(South Korea)	25	50	10	28	8	12	133
14	Claudia Pechstein	(Germany)	60	28	32	–	–	–	120
15	Brittany Schussler	(Canada)	28	16	24	14	12	21	115
16	Marije Joling	(Netherlands)	45	32	8	18	–	–	103
17	Natalia Czerwonka	(Poland)	21	12	21	12	18	16	100
18	Olga Graf	(Russia)	32	45	–	10	–	8	95
19	Miho Takagi	(Japan)	14	14	–	24	24	18	94
20	Yuliya Skokova	(Russia)	18	36	14	–	16	6	90
21	Monique Angermüller	(Germany)	16	–	–	19	45	–	80
22	Cindy Klassen	(Canada)	12	8	12	8	21	14	75
23	Karolína Erbanová	(Czech Republic)	–	19	40	–	6	–	65
24	Laurine van Riessen	(Netherlands)	40	21	–	–	–	–	61
25	Luiza Złotkowska	(Poland)	8	6	16	16	–	–	46
26	Hege Bøkko	(Norway)	6	0	25	6	5	–	42
27	Yevgenia Dmitrieva	(Russia)	8	11	–	21	–	–	40
28	Brittany Bowe	(United States)	–	–	–	–	25	10	35
29	Masako Hozumi	(Japan)	–	–	0	25	10	–	35
30	Jelena Peeters	(Belgium)	0	6	0	6	15	–	27
31	Mari Hemmer	(Norway)	0	0	19	5	–	–	24
32	Ayaka Kikuchi	(Japan)	1	15	6	–	–	–	22
33	Heather Richardson	(United States)	–	–	–	–	19	–	19
33	Zhang Hong	(China)	19	–	–	–	–	–	19
35	Yekaterina Aydova	(Kazakhstan)	0	–	6	11	–	–	17
36	Kaylin Irvine	(Canada)	0	0	15	–	–	–	15
36	Maki Tabata	(Japan)	–	–	–	15	–	–	15
38	Misaki Oshigiri	(Japan)	0	4	11	–	–	–	15
39	Park Do-yeong	(South Korea)	0	0	0	0	11	–	11
40	Nao Kodaira	(Japan)	10	0	–	–	–	–	10
41	Noh Seon-yeong	(South Korea)	0	8	1	0	0	–	9
41	Anna Ringsred	(United States)	–	–	–	8	1	–	9
43	Ivanie Blondin	(Canada)	–	–	8	–	–	–	8
43	Katarzyna Woźniak	(Poland)	–	–	–	–	8	–	8
45	Zhao Xin	(China)	0	2	–	2	4	–	8
46	Isabell Ost	(Germany)	2	1	4	0	0	–	7
47	Jennifer Bay	(Germany)	–	–	–	0	6	–	6
47	Gabriele Hirschbichler	(Germany)	6	–	–	0	–	–	6
49	Yuki Matsuda	(Germany)	–	–	–	4	–	–	4
49	Jilleanne Rookard	(United States)	4	0	–	–	–	–	4
51	Anna Rokita	(Austria)	–	–	–	–	2	–	2
51	Tatyana Sokirko	(Kazakhstan)	–	0	2	–	0	–	2
53	Kaitlyn McGregor	(Switzerland)	–	–	–	1	–	–	1
