= 2012–13 ISU Speed Skating World Cup – Men's 5000 and 10000 metres =

The 5000 and 10000 meters distances for men in the 2012–13 ISU Speed Skating World Cup were contested over six races on six occasions, out of a total of nine World Cup occasions for the season, with the first occasion taking place in Heerenveen, Netherlands, on 16–18 November 2012, and the final occasion also taking place in Heerenveen on 8–10 March 2013.

Just like the previous season, Dutch skaters dominated the 5000/10000 distance, taking 16 out of 18 available podium places over the season, including all gold and silver medals, and only letting two bronze medals slip to a non-Dutchman. The medallists were the same as the previous season, however in a different order: Jorrit Bergsma won the cup, while his countrymen Bob de Jong – the defending champion – and Sven Kramer came second and third, respectively.

== Top three ==
Medal	Athlete	Points	Previous season
Gold	(Netherlands) Jorrit Bergsma	520	3rd
Silver	(Netherlands) Bob de Jong	485	1st
Bronze	(Netherlands) Sven Kramer	450	2nd

== Race medallists ==
Occasion #	Location	Date	Distance	Gold	Time	Silver	Time	Bronze	Time	Report
1	Heerenveen, Netherlands	16 November	5000 metres	Sven Kramer; Netherlands	6:16.09	Jorrit Bergsma; Netherlands	6:16.78	Jan Blokhuijsen; Netherlands	6:16.81	
2	Kolomna, Russia	24 November	5000 metres	Sven Kramer; Netherlands	6:10.62	Jan Blokhuijsen; Netherlands	6:11.97	Jorrit Bergsma; Netherlands	6:13.08	
3	Astana, Kazachstan	2 December	10000 metres	Jorrit Bergsma; Netherlands	12:50.40	Bob de Jong; Netherlands	12:51.22	Lee Seung-hoon; South Korea	13:07.06	
7	Inzell, Germany	9 February	5000 metres	Sven Kramer; Netherlands	6:11.76	Bob de Jong; Netherlands	6:14.08	Jorrit Bergsma; Netherlands	6:14.55	
8	Erfurt, Germany	1 March	10000 metres	Bob de Jong; Netherlands	12:53.56	Jorrit Bergsma; Netherlands	12:55.36	Lee Seung-hoon; South Korea	13:19.84	
9	Heerenveen, Netherlands	9 March	5000 metres	Sven Kramer; Netherlands	6:10.78	Jorrit Bergsma; Netherlands	6:15.74	Bob de Jong; Netherlands	6:18.26	

== Standings ==
Standings as of 10 March 2013 (end of the season).

#	Name	Nat.	HVN1	KOL	AST	INZ	ERF	HVN2	Total
1	Jorrit Bergsma	(Netherlands)	80	70	100	70	80	120	520
2	Bob de Jong	(Netherlands)	60	60	80	80	100	105	485
3	Sven Kramer	(Netherlands)	100	100	–	100	–	150	450
4	Lee Seung-hoon	(South Korea)	32	50	70	35	70	90	347
5	Jan Blokhuijsen	(Netherlands)	70	80	40	40	–	75	305
6	Sverre Lunde Pedersen	(Norway)	30	40	50	50	–	45	215
7	Håvard Bøkko	(Norway)	35	45	60	30	–	40	210
8	Ted-Jan Bloemen	(Netherlands)	45	21	25	–	60	32	183
9	Bart Swings	(Belgium)	25	25	30	45	–	36	161
10	Moritz Geisreiter	(Germany)	10	32	35	60	–	18	155
11	Patrick Beckert	(Germany)	16	15	19	25	45	24	144
12	Marco Weber	(Germany)	18	16	27	16	50	16	143
13	Aleksandr Rumyantsev	(Russia)	9	19	5	27	35	21	116
14	Dmitry Babenko	(Kazakhstan)	19	18	45	10	21	–	113
15	Alexej Baumgärtner	(Germany)	21	14	21	12	25	12	105
16	Jordan Belchos	(Canada)	7	27	23	14	18	14	103
17	Alexis Contin	(France)	40	30	18	–	–	–	88
18	Ivan Skobrev	(Russia)	50	35	–	–	–	–	85
19	Shane Dobbin	(New Zealand)	14	–	6	23	40	–	83
20	Jonathan Kuck	(United States)	–	–	–	21	32	28	81
21	Denis Yuskov	(Russia)	27	12	–	32	–	–	71
22	Rob Hadders	(Netherlands)	–	–	32	–	30	–	62
23	Robert Lehmann	(Germany)	11	23	0	19	–	–	53
24	Jan Szymański	(Poland)	23	10	15	0	–	–	48
25	Ko Byung-wook	(South Korea)	6	1	0	11	15	–	33
26	Patrick Meek	(United States)	1	0	–	2	27	–	30
27	Daniil Sinitsyn	(Russia)	–	–	2	–	23	–	25
28	Ewen Fernandez	(France)	5	11	7	–	–	–	23
29	Martin Hänggi	(Switzerland)	0	0	1	0	19	–	20
30	Lucas Makowsky	(Canada)	15	4	–	0	–	–	19
31	Emery Lehman	(United States)	12	7	–	0	–	–	19
32	Bob de Vries	(Netherlands)	–	–	–	18	0	–	18
33	Joo Hyung-joon	(South Korea)	4	9	4	–	–	–	17
34	Marco Cignini	(Italy)	3	2	11	–	–	–	16
35	Kim Cheol-min	(South Korea)	–	–	–	15	0	–	15
36	Roland Cieslak	(Poland)	–	0	0	7	7	–	14
37	Mikhail Kochnev	(Russia)	–	0	0	–	11	–	11
38	Luca Stefani	(Italy)	–	–	–	5	6	–	11
39	Roger Schneider	(Switzerland)	0	0	9	0	1	–	10
40	Thomas-Henrik Søfteland	(Norway)	–	–	–	–	9	–	9
40	Sergey Gryaztsov	(Russia)	–	–	–	9	–	–	9
42	Sun Longjiang	(China)	0	3	–	0	5	–	8
43	Bram Smallenbroek	(Austria)	0	0	–	6	–	–	6
43	Haralds Silovs	(Latvia)	–	6	–	–	–	–	6
45	Brian Hansen	(United States)	–	5	–	–	–	–	5
46	Ferre Spruyt	(Belgium)	0	0	3	0	2	–	5
47	Vitaly Mikhailov	(Belarus)	0	0	0	0	4	–	4
47	Simen Spieler Nilsen	(Norway)	–	–	–	4	–	–	4
49	Paul Dyrud	(United States)	–	–	–	0	3	–	3
49	Mathieu Giroux	(Canada)	–	0	–	3	–	–	3
51	Tormod Bjørnetun Haugen	(Norway)	2	0	–	–	–	–	2
52	Sebastian Druszkiewicz	(Poland)	0	0	0	1	–	–	1
