= 2012–13 ISU Speed Skating World Cup – Men's team pursuit =

The men's team pursuit in the 2012–13 ISU Speed Skating World Cup was contested over four races on four occasions, out of a total of nine World Cup occasions for the season, with the first occasion taking place in Heerenveen, Netherlands, on 16–18 November 2012, and the final occasion also taking place in Heerenveen on 8–10 March 2013.

The Netherlands successfully defended their title from the previous season, while South Korea came second and Russia came third.

== Top three ==
Medal	Country	Points	Previous season
Gold	Netherlands	450	1st
Silver	South Korea	350	2nd
Bronze	Russia	285	5th

== Race medallists ==
Occasion #	Location	Date	Gold	Time	Silver	Time	Bronze	Time	Report
1	Heerenveen, Netherlands	17 November	Netherlands; Jan Blokhuijsen; Sven Kramer; Koen Verweij	3:39.76	Russia; Yevgeny Lalenkov; Ivan Skobrev; Denis Yuskov	3:42.90	South Korea; Joo Hyung-joon; Ko Byung-wook; Lee Seung-hoon	3:43.57	
3	Astana, Kazachstan	1 December	Netherlands; Jorrit Bergsma; Koen Verweij; Jan Blokhuijsen	3:41.27	South Korea; Lee Seung-hoon; Joo Hyung-joon; Kim Cheol-min	3:41.49	Norway; Håvard Bøkko; Sverre Lunde Pedersen; Simen Spieler Nilsen	3:43.43	
8	Erfurt, Germany	2 March	Netherlands; Sven Kramer; Jorrit Bergsma; Koen Verweij	3:45.21	South Korea; Lee Seung-hoon; Ko Byung-wook; Kim Cheol-min	3:45.33	Poland; Zbigniew Bródka; Konrad Niedźwiedzki; Jan Szymański	3:45.79	
9	Heerenveen, Netherlands	8 March	Netherlands; Jan Blokhuijsen; Sven Kramer; Koen Verweij; Jorrit Bergsma	3:40.64	South Korea; Joo Hyung-joon; Ko Byung-wook; Lee Seung-hoon; Kim Cheol-min	3:42.69	Russia; Yevgeny Lalenkov; Ivan Skobrev; Denis Yuskov	3:43.02	

== Standings ==
Standings as of 10 March 2013 (end of the season).

#	Country	HVN1	AST	ERF	HVN2	Total
1	Netherlands	100	100	100	150	450
2	South Korea	70	80	80	120	350
3	Russia	80	40	60	105	285
4	Norway	45	70	50	90	255
5	Poland	40	50	70	–	160
6	Canada	60	60	30	–	150
7	Germany	50	35	45	–	130
8	Italy	35	25	40	–	100
9	France	30	45	–	–	75
10	Belgium	16	30	25	–	71
11	United States	25	–	35	–	60
12	Japan	21	18	18	–	57
13	China	18	–	21	–	39
14	Kazakhstan	–	21	–	–	21
