= 2012–13 ISU Speed Skating World Cup – Women's 1000 metres =

The 1000 meters distance for women in the 2012–13 ISU Speed Skating World Cup was contested over nine races on six occasions, out of a total of nine World Cup occasions for the season, with the first occasion taking place in Heerenveen, Netherlands, on 16–18 November 2012, and the final occasion also taking place in Heerenveen on 8–10 March 2013.

Heather Richardson of the United States won the cup, while Brittany Bowe, also of the United States, came second, and Karolína Erbanová of the Czech Republic came third. The defending champion, Christine Nesbitt of Canada, came fourth.

== Top three ==
Medal	Athlete	Points	Previous season
Gold	(United States) Heather Richardson	525	2nd
Silver	(United States) Brittany Bowe	480	10th
Bronze	(Czech Republic) Karolína Erbanová	465	18th

== Race medallists ==
Occasion #	Location	Date	Gold	Time	Silver	Time	Bronze	Time	Report
1	Heerenveen, Netherlands	18 November	Heather Richardson; United States	1:15.27	Zhang Hong; China	1:15.41	Lotte van Beek; Netherlands	1:15.83	
4	Nagano, Japan	8 December	Heather Richardson; United States	1:15.24	Christine Nesbitt; Canada	1:15.45	Lotte van Beek; Netherlands	1:16.15	
4	Nagano, Japan	9 December	Christine Nesbitt; Canada	1:15.13	Heather Richardson; United States	1:15.26	Lotte van Beek; Netherlands	1:15.87	
5	Harbin, China	15 December	Karolína Erbanová; Czech Republic	1:17.10	Zhang Hong; China	1:17.14	Margot Boer; Netherlands	1:17.35	
5	Harbin, China	16 December	Zhang Hong; China	1:16.717	Karolína Erbanová; Czech Republic	1:16.718	Olga Fatkulina; Russia	1:17.12	
6	Calgary, Alberta, Canada	19 January	Heather Richardson; United States	1:13.09	Christine Nesbitt; Canada	1:13.67	Brittany Bowe; United States	1:13.92	
6	Calgary, Alberta, Canada	20 January	Heather Richardson; United States	1:13.30	Ireen Wüst; Netherlands	1:13.89	Brittany Bowe; United States	1:13.96	
8	Erfurt, Germany	3 March	Brittany Bowe; United States	1:15.34	Ireen Wüst; Netherlands	1:15.74	Olga Fatkulina; Russia	1:15.79	
9	Heerenveen, Netherlands	9 March	Christine Nesbitt; Canada	1:15.48	Zhang Hong; China	1:15.50	Laurine van Riessen; Netherlands	1:15.95	

== Standings ==
Standings as of 10 March 2013 (end of the season).

#	Name	Nat.	HVN1	NAG1	NAG2	HAR1	HAR2	CAL1	CAL2	ERF	HVN2	Total
1	Heather Richardson	(United States)	100	100	80	–	–	100	100	21	24	525
2	Brittany Bowe	(United States)	45	45	60	–	–	70	70	100	90	480
3	Karolína Erbanová	(Czech Republic)	40	40	45	100	80	28	60	36	36	465
4	Christine Nesbitt	(Canada)	28	80	100	–	–	80	–	–	150	438
5	Zhang Hong	(China)	80	–	–	80	100	–	–	40	120	420
6	Olga Fatkulina	(Russia)	21	60	28	45	70	40	40	70	32	406
7	Lotte van Beek	(Netherlands)	70	70	70	–	–	21	30	45	75	381
8	Laurine van Riessen	(Netherlands)	50	36	32	28	60	32	35	0	105	378
9	Marrit Leenstra	(Netherlands)	60	50	50	–	–	50	45	60	28	343
10	Margot Boer	(Netherlands)	–	18	36	70	50	36	50	32	–	292
11	Yekaterina Aydova	(Kazakhstan)	36	28	40	–	–	14	18	50	45	231
12	Ireen Wüst	(Netherlands)	–	–	–	–	–	45	80	80	–	205
13	Monique Angermüller	(Germany)	24	16	21	18	21	18	21	28	21	188
14	Nao Kodaira	(Japan)	18	32	24	50	36	10	–	–	10	180
15	Miyako Sumiyoshi	(Japan)	6	24	18	40	28	24	–	16	14	170
16	Yekaterina Malysheva	(Russia)	12	21	16	36	40	5	14	14	8	166
17	Lee Sang-hwa	(South Korea)	25	14	–	60	45	16	0	–	–	160
18	Yu Jing	(China)	32	–	–	32	32	60	–	–	–	156
19	Wang Beixing	(China)	2	12	25	24	24	8	–	24	18	137
20	Yekaterina Lobysheva	(Russia)	16	–	–	–	–	25	25	18	40	124
21	Maki Tsuji	(Japan)	6	19	19	21	18	6	12	10	6	117
22	Kaylin Irvine	(Canada)	0	6	25	–	–	19	19	12	12	93
23	Brittany Schussler	(Canada)	11	12	14	–	–	15	25	6	–	83
24	Gabriele Hirschbichler	(Germany)	8	10	8	16	10	11	–	15	–	78
25	Anastasia Bucsis	(Canada)	15	5	6	14	16	0	11	8	–	75
26	Kali Christ	(Canada)	4	–	–	–	–	4	8	25	16	57
27	Erina Kamiya	(Japan)	1	11	15	10	12	1	0	0	–	50
28	Yuliya Liteykina	(Russia)	0	15	11	6	2	–	–	1	–	35
29	Jennifer Plate	(Germany)	0	–	2	12	14	0	–	6	–	34
30	Yuliya Skokova	(Russia)	5	–	–	–	–	0	4	19	–	28
31	Yekaterina Shikhova	(Russia)	–	–	–	–	–	12	16	–	–	28
32	Miho Takagi	(Japan)	8	8	10	–	–	–	–	–	–	26
33	Anice Das	(Netherlands)	14	6	5	–	–	–	–	–	–	25
34	Nadezhda Aseyeva	(Russia)	–	8	1	8	8	–	–	–	–	25
35	Yuki Matsuda	(Japan)	–	–	–	–	–	8	15	–	–	23
36	Jin Peiyu	(China)	19	–	–	0	–	–	–	–	–	19
37	Anna Ringsred	(United States)	–	–	–	–	–	0	6	8	–	14
38	Park Seung-ju	(South Korea)	0	1	0	5	4	2	2	–	–	14
39	Vanessa Bittner	(Austria)	–	–	–	–	–	–	–	11	–	11
40	Kim Hyun-yung	(South Korea)	0	0	4	0	6	0	1	–	–	11
41	Diane Valkenburg	(Netherlands)	10	–	–	–	–	–	–	–	–	10
42	Shannon Rempel	(Canada)	–	4	6	–	–	–	–	–	–	10
43	Denise Roth	(Germany)	0	0	2	4	3	0	0	0	–	9
44	Sugar Todd	(United States)	0	0	8	–	–	0	0	0	–	8
45	Yukana Nishina	(Japan)	–	–	–	3	5	–	–	–	–	8
46	Judith Hesse	(Germany)	–	–	–	–	–	6	–	–	–	6
47	Liu Yichi	(China)	–	–	–	–	–	–	–	4	–	4
48	Qi Shuai	(China)	–	0	0	2	–	0	0	2	–	4
49	Danielle Wotherspoon	(Canada)	–	–	–	1	1	–	0	–	–	2
