= 2012–13 ISU Speed Skating World Cup – Women's 500 metres =

The 500 meters distance for women in the 2012–13 ISU Speed Skating World Cup was contested over 12 races on six occasions, out of a total of nine World Cup occasions for the season, with the first occasion taking place in Heerenveen, Netherlands, on 16–18 November 2012, and the final occasion also taking place in Heerenveen on 8–10 March 2013.

A standout moment was South Korean skater Lee Sang-hwa breaking her own world record twice during the season. On January 19, 2013, at the World Cup event in Calgary, she set a new world record with a time of 36.99 seconds. The following day, January 20, she surpassed this achievement by recording a time of 36.80 seconds, further lowering the world record.

Lee Sang-hwa went on to win the cup, while Jenny Wolf of Germany came second, and Wang Beixing of China came third. The defending champion, Yu Jing of China, ended up in 10th place.

== Top three ==
Medal	Athlete	Points	Previous season
Gold	(South Korea) Lee Sang-hwa	1055	2nd
Silver	(Germany) Jenny Wolf	851	3rd
Bronze	(China) Wang Beixing	756	7th

== Race medallists ==
Occasion #	Location	Date	Gold	Time	Silver	Time	Bronze	Time	Report
1	Heerenveen, Netherlands	16 November	Lee Sang-hwa; South Korea	37.85	Heather Richardson; United States	37.95	Nao Kodaira; Japan	38.26	
1	Heerenveen, Netherlands	17 November	Lee Sang-hwa; South Korea	37.92	Heather Richardson; United States	38.13	Jenny Wolf; Germany	38.14	
4	Nagano, Japan	8 December	Lee Sang-hwa; South Korea	37.63	Nao Kodaira; Japan	37.96	Heather Richardson; United States	38.01	
4	Nagano, Japan	9 December	Lee Sang-hwa; South Korea	37.60	Jenny Wolf; Germany	37.91	Nao Kodaira; Japan	38.09	
5	Harbin, China	15 December	Lee Sang-hwa; South Korea	37.94	Jenny Wolf; Germany	37.95	Yu Jing; China	38.53	
5	Harbin, China	16 December	Lee Sang-hwa; South Korea	37.65	Yu Jing; China	38.34	Nao Kodaira; Japan	38.38	
6	Calgary, Alberta, Canada	19 January	Lee Sang-hwa; South Korea	36.99	Heather Richardson; United States	37.12	Yu Jing; China	37.28	
6	Calgary, Alberta, Canada	20 January	Lee Sang-hwa; South Korea	36.80 WR	Heather Richardson; United States	37.42	Margot Boer; Netherlands	37.54	
8	Erfurt, Germany	1 March	Wang Beixing; China	38.07	Thijsje Oenema; Netherlands	38.34	Jenny Wolf; Germany	38.39	
8	Erfurt, Germany	2 March	Wang Beixing; China	38.15	Olga Fatkulina; Russia	38.215	Thijsje Oenema; Netherlands	38.217	
9	Heerenveen, Netherlands	8 March	Jenny Wolf; Germany	37.77	Wang Beixing; China	37.81	Lee Sang-hwa; South Korea	37.82	
9	Heerenveen, Netherlands	10 March	Lee Sang-hwa; South Korea	37.77	Wang Beixing; China	37.78	Thijsje Oenema; Netherlands	38.10	

== Standings ==
Standings as of 10 March 2013 (end of the season).

#	Name	Nat.	HVN1	HVN2	NAG1	NAG2	HAR1	HAR2	CAL1	CAL2	ERF1	ERF2	HVN3	HVN4	Total
1	Lee Sang-hwa	(South Korea)	100	100	100	100	100	100	100	100	–	–	105	150	1055
2	Jenny Wolf	(Germany)	50	70	60	80	80	60	36	45	70	60	150	90	851
3	Wang Beixing	(China)	18	40	28	60	45	45	40	40	100	100	120	120	756
4	Olga Fatkulina	(Russia)	40	32	40	36	32	50	60	24	60	80	40	75	569
5	Heather Richardson	(United States)	80	80	70	45	–	–	80	80	50	45	14	24	568
6	Thijsje Oenema	(Netherlands)	8	21	50	28	8	24	45	32	80	70	75	105	546
7	Nao Kodaira	(Japan)	70	36	80	70	60	70	5	–	–	–	12	12	415
8	Margot Boer	(Netherlands)	32	45	14	50	50	40	32	70	45	32	–	–	410
9	Laurine van Riessen	(Netherlands)	10	24	16	10	40	32	50	50	18	36	75	45	406
10	Yu Jing	(China)	45	50	–	–	70	80	70	60	–	–	–	–	375
11	Zhang Hong	(China)	60	60	–	–	24	36	–	–	24	32	90	36	362
12	Miyako Sumiyoshi	(Japan)	24	12	45	21	18	18	24	36	36	50	21	40	345
13	Karolína Erbanová	(Czech Republic)	28	28	32	40	28	21	16	28	21	6	16	10	274
14	Maki Tsuji	(Japan)	21	12	18	24	36	28	21	16	32	18	32	16	274
15	Brittany Bowe	(United States)	15	25	24	18	–	–	18	18	40	40	36	32	266
16	Christine Nesbitt	(Canada)	36	14	36	32	–	–	28	–	–	–	28	–	174
17	Judith Hesse	(Germany)	19	8	–	–	–	–	25	21	28	21	24	14	160
18	Erina Kamiya	(Japan)	6	2	19	25	16	6	14	10	14	14	6	21	153
19	Yekaterina Aydova	(Kazakhstan)	11	11	12	12	–	–	0	6	25	24	21	28	150
20	Anastasia Bucsis	(Canada)	8	15	10	8	10	5	10	12	18	16	8	8	128
21	Anice Das	(Netherlands)	8	25	8	4	–	–	2	0	19	25	10	18	119
22	Denise Roth	(Germany)	0	4	11	19	6	14	15	15	6	10	5	6	111
23	Yekaterina Malysheva	(Russia)	0	19	5	6	21	16	8	8	8	–	–	–	91
24	Marrit Leenstra	(Netherlands)	14	16	21	16	–	–	12	–	10	–	–	–	89
25	Yuliya Liteykina	(Russia)	4	0	14	25	5	10	–	14	–	12	–	–	84
26	Danielle Wotherspoon	(Canada)	5	5	1	1	11	11	1	19	11	19	–	–	84
27	Jennifer Plate	(Germany)	6	4	4	15	12	8	4	8	12	0	–	–	73
28	Lauren Cholewinski	(United States)	12	6	6	5	–	–	0	25	5	8	–	–	67
29	Yukana Nishina	(Japan)	0	6	8	4	19	25	–	–	–	–	–	–	62
30	Jin Peiyu	(China)	16	18	–	–	14	12	–	–	–	–	–	–	60
31	Qi Shuai	(China)	–	–	0	0	25	4	6	6	8	8	–	–	57
32	Yvonne Daldossi	(Italy)	0	0	0	0	8	15	0	0	4	11	–	–	38
32	Kaylin Irvine	(Canada)	–	–	–	–	–	–	11	11	1	15	–	–	38
34	Mayon Kuipers	(Netherlands)	–	–	–	–	15	19	–	–	–	–	–	–	34
34	Yekaterina Lobysheva	(Russia)	–	–	–	–	–	–	19	–	15	–	–	–	34
36	Sugar Todd	(United States)	1	1	15	11	–	–	0	0	2	1	–	–	31
37	Kim Hyun-yung	(South Korea)	0	0	0	0	1	8	6	1	–	–	–	–	16
38	Shannon Rempel	(Canada)	2	0	6	6	–	–	0	2	–	–	–	–	16
39	Park Seung-ju	(South Korea)	0	0	0	2	4	6	0	0	–	–	–	–	12
40	Li Dan	(China)	0	0	2	8	–	–	–	–	–	–	–	–	10
41	Janine Smit	(Netherlands)	–	–	–	–	–	–	–	4	–	6	–	–	10
42	Svetlana Radkevich	(Belarus)	0	0	–	–	–	–	8	0	–	–	–	–	8
43	Paola Simionato	(Italy)	0	0	0	0	2	4	0	0	0	2	–	–	8
44	Kali Christ	(Canada)	–	–	–	–	–	–	–	0	6	–	–	–	6
44	Gabriele Hirschbichler	(Germany)	0	0	0	–	6	–	–	–	0	–	–	–	6
46	Vanessa Bittner	(Austria)	–	–	–	–	–	–	–	–	0	4	–	–	4
47	Elina Risku	(Finland)	0	0	–	–	0	2	0	–	0	0	–	–	2
