= 2012–13 ISU Speed Skating World Cup – Women's 3000 and 5000 metres =

The 3000 and 5000 meters distances for women in the 2012–13 ISU Speed Skating World Cup were contested over six races on six occasions, out of a total of nine World Cup occasions for the season, with the first occasion taking place in Heerenveen, Netherlands, on 16–18 November 2012, and the final occasion also taking place in Heerenveen on 8–10 March 2013.

Martina Sáblíková of the Czech Republic successfully defended her title from the previous season, while Claudia Pechstein of Germany came second, and Diane Valkenburg the Netherlands came third.

== Top three ==
Medal	Athlete	Points	Previous season
Gold	(Czech Republic) Martina Sáblíková	475	1st
Silver	(Germany) Claudia Pechstein	421	3rd
Bronze	(Netherlands) Diane Valkenburg	410	4th

== Race medallists ==
Occasion #	Location	Date	Distance	Gold	Time	Silver	Time	Bronze	Time	Report
1	Heerenveen, Netherlands	16 November	3000 metres	Stephanie Beckert; Germany	4:04.39	Martina Sáblíková; Czech Republic	4:06.71	Jorien Ter Mors; Netherlands	4:06.90	
2	Kolomna, Russia	25 November	3000 metres	Claudia Pechstein; Germany	4:02.31	Martina Sáblíková; Czech Republic	4:02.46	Marije Joling; Netherlands	4:03.90	
3	Astana, Kazachstan	1 December	5000 metres	Martina Sáblíková; Czech Republic	7:00.75	Claudia Pechstein; Germany	7:01.05	Olga Graf; Russia	7:01.38	
7	Inzell, Germany	10 February	3000 metres	Ireen Wüst; Netherlands	4:02.23	Diane Valkenburg; Netherlands	4:05.31	Martina Sáblíková; Czech Republic	4:05.41	
8	Erfurt, Germany	1 March	5000 metres	Martina Sáblíková; Czech Republic	7:01.33	Stephanie Beckert; Germany	7:02.84	Claudia Pechstein; Germany	7:06.96	
9	Heerenveen, Netherlands	9 March	3000 metres	Ireen Wüst; Netherlands	3:58.68	Diane Valkenburg; Netherlands	4:04.75	Linda de Vries; Netherlands	4:04.87	

== Standings ==
Standings as of 10 March 2013 (end of the season).

#	Name	Nat.	HVN1	KOL	AST	INZ	ERF	HVN2	Total
1	Martina Sáblíková	(Czech Republic)	80	80	100	70	100	45	475
2	Claudia Pechstein	(Germany)	21	100	80	60	70	90	421
3	Diane Valkenburg	(Netherlands)	60	50	50	80	50	120	410
4	Stephanie Beckert	(Germany)	100	60	60	50	80	21	371
5	Marije Joling	(Netherlands)	45	70	45	21	35	75	291
6	Ireen Wüst	(Netherlands)	35	–	–	100	–	150	285
7	Olga Graf	(Russia)	50	35	70	25	40	24	244
8	Linda de Vries	(Netherlands)	–	45	–	45	45	105	240
9	Masako Hozumi	(Japan)	16	23	25	35	60	40	199
10	Kim Bo-reum	(South Korea)	32	40	40	16	21	36	185
11	Katarzyna Bachleda-Curuś	(Poland)	27	25	18	40	0	32	142
12	Yevgenia Dmitrieva	(Russia)	18	18	35	18	30	14	133
13	Ida Njåtun	(Norway)	30	21	21	30	–	28	130
14	Ivanie Blondin	(Canada)	25	16	30	12	6	15	105
15	Annouk van der Weijden	(Netherlands)	–	12	15	32	25	12	96
16	Cindy Klassen	(Canada)	9	3	–	11	32	18	73
17	Jorien Ter Mors	(Netherlands)	70	–	–	–	–	–	70
18	Antoinette de Jong	(Netherlands)	40	30	–	–	–	–	70
19	Mari Hemmer	(Norway)	4	6	9	23	27	–	69
20	Jelena Peeters	(Belgium)	3	4	27	14	11	–	59
21	Natalia Czerwonka	(Poland)	19	14	–	19	–	–	52
22	Rixt Meijer	(Netherlands)	–	–	32	–	19	–	51
23	Eriko Ishino	(Japan)	14	15	11	10	1	–	51
24	Bente Kraus	(Germany)	0	2	19	27	–	–	48
25	Park Do-yeong	(South Korea)	23	10	0	2	7	–	42
26	Maria Lamb	(United States)	5	0	–	5	23	–	33
27	Christine Nesbitt	(Canada)	–	32	–	–	–	–	32
28	Yekaterina Shikhova	(Russia)	–	27	–	–	–	–	27
29	Carlijn Achtereekte	(Netherlands)	–	–	23	–	–	–	23
30	Brittany Schussler	(Canada)	11	5	7	–	–	–	23
31	Anna Rokita	(Austria)	–	–	–	7	15	–	22
31	Risa Takayama	(Japan)	15	1	6	–	–	–	22
33	Jilleanne Rookard	(United States)	0	19	–	–	–	–	19
34	Shoko Fujimura	(Japan)	–	–	–	15	–	–	15
35	Ayaka Kikuchi	(Japan)	12	0	3	–	–	–	15
36	Anna Chernova	(Russia)	–	–	–	6	9	–	15
36	Luiza Złotkowska	(Poland)	–	9	4	0	2	–	15
38	Isabell Ost	(Germany)	7	7	–	–	–	–	14
39	Yelena Sokhryakova	(Russia)	1	11	–	–	–	–	12
40	Tatiana Ushakova	(Russia)	2	0	–	4	5	–	11
41	Fuyo Matsuoka	(Japan)	6	0	1	3	–	–	10
42	Maki Tabata	(Japan)	–	–	–	9	–	–	9
43	Viktoriya Rusalyova	(Russia)	0	–	5	–	–	–	5
44	Jennifer Bay	(Germany)	–	–	–	0	4	–	4
45	Francesca Lollobrigida	(Italy)	–	–	–	–	3	–	3
46	Lada Zadonskaya	(Russia)	–	–	2	–	–	–	2
47	Kaitlyn McGregor	(Switzerland)	–	–	–	1	–	–	1
