= 2012–13 ISU Speed Skating World Cup – Women's mass start =

The women's mass start in the 2012–13 ISU Speed Skating World Cup was contested over four races on four occasions, out of a total of nine World Cup occasions for the season, with the first occasion taking place in Heerenveen, Netherlands, on 16–18 November 2012, and the final occasion also taking place in Heerenveen on 8–10 March 2013.

Kim Bo-reum of South Korea won the cup, while the defending champion, Mariska Huisman of the Netherlands, came second, and Ivanie Blondin of Canada came third.

== Top three ==
| Medal | Athlete | Points | Previous season |
|---|---|---|---|
| Gold | (South Korea) Kim Bo-reum | 365 | 7th |
| Silver | (Netherlands) Mariska Huisman | 330 | 1st |
| Bronze | (Canada) Ivanie Blondin | 300 | 16th |

== Race medallists ==
| Occasion # | Location | Date | Gold | Time | Silver | Time | Bronze | Time | Report |
|---|---|---|---|---|---|---|---|---|---|
| 1 | Heerenveen, Netherlands | 17 November | Mariska Huisman; Netherlands | 8:22.96 | Jorien Ter Mors; Netherlands | 8:22.97 | Claudia Pechstein; Germany | 8:23.05 | |
| 2 | Kolomna, Russia | 24 November | Kim Bo-reum; South Korea | 8:40.77 | Ivanie Blondin; Canada | 8:41.19 | Mariska Huisman; Netherlands | 8:40.90 | |
| 7 | Inzell, Germany | 9 February | Kim Bo-reum; South Korea | 8:13.80 | Francesca Lollobrigida; Italy | 8:14.10 | Mariska Huisman; Netherlands | 8:14.11 | |
| 9 | Heerenveen, Netherlands | 10 March | Irene Schouten; Netherlands | 9:14.26 | Ivanie Blondin; Canada | 9:14.29 | Kim Bo-reum; South Korea | 9:14.38 | |

== Standings ==
Standings as of 10 March 2013 (end of the season).

| # | Name | Nat. | HVN1 | KOL | INZ | HVN2 | Total |
|---|---|---|---|---|---|---|---|
| 1 | Kim Bo-reum | (South Korea) | 60 | 100 | 100 | 105 | 365 |
| 2 | Mariska Huisman | (Netherlands) | 100 | 70 | 70 | 90 | 330 |
| 3 | Ivanie Blondin | (Canada) | 50 | 80 | 50 | 120 | 300 |
| 4 | Irene Schouten | (Netherlands) | – | – | 60 | 150 | 210 |
| 5 | Claudia Pechstein | (Germany) | 70 | 60 | 21 | 32 | 183 |
| 6 | Francesca Lollobrigida | (Italy) | – | – | 80 | 75 | 155 |
| 7 | Park Do-yeong | (South Korea) | 45 | 50 | 28 | 18 | 141 |
| 8 | Bente Kraus | (Germany) | 40 | 40 | 6 | 24 | 110 |
| 9 | Vanessa Bittner | (Austria) | – | – | 45 | 45 | 90 |
| 10 | Jelena Peeters | (Belgium) | 32 | – | 24 | 28 | 84 |
| 11 | Jorien Ter Mors | (Netherlands) | 80 | – | – | – | 80 |
| 12 | Anna Rokita | (Austria) | – | – | 40 | 36 | 76 |
| 13 | Katarzyna Woźniak | (Poland) | – | 16 | 12 | 40 | 68 |
| 14 | Noh Seon-yeonh | (South Korea) | – | 28 | 14 | 21 | 63 |
| 15 | Viktoriya Rusalyova | (Russia) | 8 | 45 | – | – | 53 |
| 16 | Rixt Meijer | (Netherlands) | – | – | 32 | 16 | 48 |
| 17 | Maria Lamb | (United States) | 3 | 6 | 36 | – | 45 |
| 18 | Francesca Bettrone | (Italy) | – | 36 | – | – | 36 |
| 18 | Karolina Domanska-Ksyt | (Poland) | 36 | – | – | – | 36 |
| 20 | Brianne Tutt | (Canada) | 18 | 18 | – | – | 36 |
| 21 | Liu Yichi | (China) | – | 24 | 10 | – | 34 |
| 22 | Liu Feitong | (China) | – | 32 | – | – | 32 |
| 23 | Lim Yung-soo | (South Korea) | 28 | – | – | – | 28 |
| 24 | Wang Jianlu | (China) | 12 | – | 16 | – | 28 |
| 25 | Tatyana Mikhailova | (Belarus) | 6 | 14 | 5 | – | 25 |
| 26 | Masako Hozumi | (Japan) | 24 | – | – | – | 24 |
| 27 | Anna Chernova | (Russia) | 14 | 10 | – | – | 24 |
| 28 | Zhao Xin | (China) | – | 21 | – | – | 21 |
| 28 | Marije Joling | (Netherlands) | 21 | – | – | – | 21 |
| 30 | Lada Zadonskaya | (Russia) | – | – | 18 | – | 18 |
| 31 | Nele Armée | (Belgium) | 16 | – | – | – | 16 |
| 32 | Kali Christ | (Canada) | – | 12 | – | – | 12 |
| 33 | Tatiana Ushakova | (Russia) | 10 | – | – | – | 10 |
| 34 | Paola Simionato | (Italy) | – | – | 8 | – | 8 |
| 34 | Anastasiya Vorontsova | (Russia) | – | 8 | – | – | 8 |
| 36 | Brooke Lochland | (Australia) | 4 | – | 3 | – | 7 |
| 37 | Risa Takayama | (Japan) | 5 | – | – | – | 5 |
| 38 | Gabriele Hirschbichler | (Germany) | – | – | 4 | – | 4 |
