= 2011–12 ISU Speed Skating World Cup – Men's 500 metres =

The 500 metres distance for men in the 2011–12 ISU Speed Skating World Cup was contested over 12 races on six occasions, out of a total of seven World Cup occasions for the season, with the first occasion taking place in Chelyabinsk, Russia, on 18–20 November 2011, and the final occasion taking place in Berlin, Germany, on 9–11 March 2012.

Mo Tae-bum of South Korea won the cup, while Pekka Koskela of Finland came second, and Tucker Fredricks of the United States came third. Defending champion Lee Kang-seok of South Korea finished in 11th place.

== Top three ==
Medal	Athlete	Points	Previous season
Gold	(South Korea) Mo Tae-bum	702	–
Silver	(Finland) Pekka Koskela	674	13th
Bronze	(United States) Tucker Fredricks	646	4th

== Race medallists ==
Occasion #	Location	Date	Gold	Time	Silver	Time	Bronze	Time	Report
1	Chelyabinsk, Russia	18 November	Pekka Koskela; Finland	35.00	Jan Smeekens; Netherlands	35.01	Yūya Oikawa; Japan	35.07	
1	Chelyabinsk, Russia	19 November	Joji Kato; Japan	34.92	Mo Tae-bum; South Korea	35.01	Yūya Oikawa; Japan	35.14	
2	Astana, Kazakhstan	25 November	Mo Tae-bum; South Korea	34.89	Tucker Fredricks; United States	34.94	Stefan Groothuis; Netherlands	35.01	
2	Astana, Kazakhstan	26 November	Jan Smeekens; Netherlands	35.05	Mo Tae-bum; South Korea	35.06	Tucker Fredricks; United States	35.19	
3	Heerenveen, Netherlands	2 December	Tucker Fredricks; United States	34.98	Joji Kato; Japan	35.07	Mo Tae-bum; South Korea	35.08	
3	Heerenveen, Netherlands	3 December	Pekka Koskela; Finland	35.01	Joji Kato; Japan	35.02	Jesper Hospes; Netherlands	35.06	
4	Salt Lake City, United States	21 January	Keiichiro Nagashima; Japan	34.37	Jan Smeekens; Netherlands	34.40	Tucker Fredricks; United States	34.45	
4	Salt Lake City, United States	22 January	Dmitry Lobkov; Russia	34.54	Keiichiro Nagashima; Japan	34.57	Tucker Fredricks; United States	34.60	
6	Heerenveen, Netherlands	2 March	Dmitry Lobkov; Russia	35.11	Hein Otterspeer; Netherlands	35.14	Keiichiro Nagashima; Japan	35.20	
6	Heerenveen, Netherlands	3 March	Tucker Fredricks; United States	35.05	Michel Mulder; Netherlands	35.12	Joji Kato; Japan	35.16	
7	Berlin, Germany	9 March	Jamie Gregg; Canada	35.06	Pekka Koskela; Finland	35.07	Mo Tae-bum; South Korea	35.17	
7	Berlin, Germany	10 March	Michel Mulder; Netherlands	35.01	Mo Tae-bum; South Korea	35.04	Jan Smeekens; Netherlands	35.08	

== Standings ==
Standings as of 11 March 2012 (end of the season).

#	Name	Nat.	CHE1	CHE2	AST1	AST2	HVN1	HVN2	SLC1	SLC2	HVN3	HVN4	BER1	BER2	Total
1	Mo Tae-bum	(South Korea)	25	80	100	80	70	45	45	32	–	–	105	120	702
2	Pekka Koskela	(Finland)	100	3	21	21	60	100	50	40	24	45	120	90	674
3	Tucker Fredricks	(United States)	10	28	80	70	100	60	70	70	6	100	16	36	646
4	Jan Smeekens	(Netherlands)	80	50	16	100	14	50	80	45	16	24	45	105	625
5	Joji Kato	(Japan)	45	100	32	36	80	80	18	16	18	70	12	40	547
6	Michel Mulder	(Netherlands)	32	6	28	8	25	36	16	50	50	80	36	150	517
7	Jamie Gregg	(Canada)	36	45	5	18	6	32	60	18	45	21	150	75	511
8	Keiichiro Nagashima	(Japan)	40	40	8	14	45	5	100	80	70	40	18	45	505
9	Yūya Oikawa	(Japan)	70	70	50	16	50	24	21	24	40	50	14	32	461
10	Dmitry Lobkov	(Russia)	18	12	36	6	19	25	28	100	100	60	32	21	457
11	Lee Kang-seok	(South Korea)	6	60	60	60	40	8	40	28	–	–	75	8	385
12	Ronald Mulder	(Netherlands)	28	18	40	10	36	21	–	8	–	36	90	12	299
13	Mika Poutala	(Finland)	16	16	10	40	8	12	32	36	32	28	24	28	282
14	Artur Waś	(Poland)	19	25	45	12	24	28	24	12	28	18	21	4	260
15	Stefan Groothuis	(Netherlands)	50	21	70	–	21	–	36	–	60	–	–	–	258
16	Gilmore Junio	(Canada)	14	32	24	45	32	40	8	10	14	16	5	10	250
17	Jesper Hospes	(Netherlands)	4	10	25	24	28	70	12	5	12	6	10	18	224
18	Lee Kyou-hyuk	(South Korea)	60	14	21	50	12	14	14	–	–	–	28	6	219
19	Yuji Kamijo	(Japan)	12	36	12	32	18	10	10	21	36	14	6	5	212
20	Hein Otterspeer	(Netherlands)	–	–	–	–	–	–	11	25	80	32	40	14	202
21	Ryohei Haga	(Japan)	24	8	6	28	15	0	6	14	8	8	1	1	119
22	Wang Nan	(China)	21	24	–	–	0	4	1	–	15	25	3	24	117
23	Aleksey Yesin	(Russia)	3	4	19	0	11	8	6	–	19	19	8	18	115
24	William Dutton	(Canada)	8	0	15	19	16	18	–	–	21	4	4	2	107
25	Laurent Dubreuil	(Canada)	–	–	–	–	–	–	25	60	–	–	–	–	85
26	Markus Puolakka	(Finland)	6	15	14	0	0	19	5	6	5	5	–	–	75
27	Roman Krech	(Kazakhstan)	8	1	0	–	4	2	15	19	10	12	–	–	71
28	Alex Boisvert-Lacroix	(Canada)	–	–	–	–	–	–	4	15	25	10	2	3	59
29	Joey Lindsey	(United States)	0	0	2	25	10	16	–	–	–	–	–	–	53
30	Richard MacLennan	(Canada)	0	11	0	6	6	15	–	–	–	–	–	–	38
31	Muncef Ouardi	(Canada)	–	–	–	–	–	–	8	6	11	11	–	–	36
32	Lee Ki-ho	(South Korea)	15	4	4	11	0	0	0	0	–	–	–	–	34
33	Tyler Derraugh	(Canada)	5	5	1	2	8	11	–	–	–	–	–	–	32
34	Artyom Kuznetsov	(Russia)	0	0	–	–	–	–	19	4	2	6	–	–	31
35	Kim Seong-kyu	(South Korea)	1	1	6	15	2	6	–	–	–	–	–	–	31
36	Daniel Greig	(Australia)	0	0	0	–	–	–	0	8	6	15	–	–	29
37	Igor Bogolubsky	(Russia)	4	6	0	8	0	0	–	11	–	–	–	–	29
38	Viktor Gluschenko	(Kazakhstan)	0	2	11	1	1	0	0	0	8	1	–	–	24
39	Yu Fengtong	(China)	2	19	–	–	0	0	–	–	–	–	–	–	21
40	Espen Aarnes Hvammen	(Norway)	2	2	8	4	0	0	0	2	1	0	–	–	19
41	Ermanno Ioriatti	(Italy)	–	–	–	–	5	6	0	1	4	2	–	–	18
42	Nico Ihle	(Germany)	11	0	–	–	–	–	–	–	–	–	–	–	11
43	Mitchell Whitmore	(United States)	0	8	0	0	0	0	1	0	0	0	–	–	9
44	Mirko Giacomo Nenzi	(Italy)	0	–	0	0	0	–	0	0	–	8	–	–	8
45	Denny Ihle	(Germany)	0	0	0	0	0	0	0	0	0	4	–	–	4
46	Shani Davis	(United States)	–	–	0	0	0	0	2	–	–	–	–	–	2
47	Samuel Schwarz	(Germany)	1	0	0	0	0	1	0	0	0	0	–	–	2
