= 2011 World Single Distance Speed Skating Championships – Men's 500 metres =

The men's 500 m race of the 2011 World Single Distance Speed Skating Championships was held on March 13 at 12:45 (round 1) and 14:15 (round 2) local time.

== Results ==
| Rank | Name | Country | Pair | Lane | Race 1 | Rank | Pair | Lane | Race 2 | Rank | Total | Time behind |
|---|---|---|---|---|---|---|---|---|---|---|---|---|
| 1st place, gold medalist(s) | Lee Kyou-hyuk | South Korea | 12 | i | 34.78 | 2 | 10 | o | 34.32 | 1 | 69.100 | |
| 2nd place, silver medalist(s) | Joji Kato | Japan | 12 | o | 34.90 | 4 | 10 | i | 34.52 | 2 | 69.420 | +0.32 |
| 3rd place, bronze medalist(s) | Jan Smeekens | Netherlands | 10 | i | 34.77 | 1 | 11 | o | 34.66 | 4 | 69.430 | +0.33 |
| 4 | Mika Poutala | Finland | 3 | o | 34.89 | 3 | 11 | i | 34.76 | 5 | 69.650 | +0.55 |
| 5 | Dmitry Lobkov | Russia | 10 | o | 35.12 | 9 | 6 | i | 34.64 | 3 | 69.760 | +0.66 |
| 6 | Jamie Gregg | Canada | 7 | o | 35.00 | 5 | 9 | i | 34.96 | 7 | 69.960 | +0.86 |
| 7 | Jacques de Koning | Netherlands | 9 | i | 35.05 | 6 | 9 | o | 34.98 | 8 | 70.030 | +0.93 |
| 8 | Tucker Fredricks | United States | 11 | o | 35.07 | 7 | 8 | i | 34.96 | 6 | 70.030 | +0.93 |
| 9 | Shani Davis | United States | 5 | o | 35.14 | 10 | 5 | i | 34.98 | 9 | 70.120 | +1.02 |
| 10 | Ermanno Ioriatti | Italy | 2 | o | 35.07 | 8 | 7 | i | 35.09 | 12 | 70.160 | +1.06 |
| 11 | Aleksey Yesin | Russia | 5 | i | 35.16 | 12 | 7 | o | 35.08 | 11 | 70.240 | +1.14 |
| 12 | Vincent Labrie | Canada | 3 | i | 35.16 | 11 | 8 | o | 35.20 | 14 | 70.360 | +1.26 |
| 13 | Nico Ihle | Germany | 8 | i | 35.33 | 14 | 5 | o | 35.07 | 10 | 70.400 | +1.30 |
| 14 | Muncef Ouardi | Canada | 2 | i | 35.24 | 13 | 6 | o | 35.32 | 17 | 70.560 | +1.46 |
| 15 | Mo Tae-bum | South Korea | 6 | o | 35.53 | 16 | 3 | i | 35.15 | 13 | 70.680 | +1.58 |
| 16 | Espen Aarnes Hvammen | Norway | 4 | o | 42.34 | 19 | 4 | i | 35.28 | 16 | 70.690 | +1.59 |
| 17 | Simon Kuipers | Netherlands | 6 | i | 35.51 | 15 | 4 | o | 35.59 | 18 | 71.100 | +2.00 |
| 18 | Ryohei Haga | Japan | 8 | o | 35.79 | 17 | 2 | i | 35.71 | 19 | 71.500 | +2.40 |
| 19 | Yūya Oikawa | Japan | 9 | o | 1:19.50 | 20 | 1 | i | 35.20 | 15 | 114.700 | +45.60 |
| 20 | Daniel Greig | Australia | 1 | i | 35.86 | 18 | 3 | o | 1:32.39 | 20 | 128.250 | +59.15 |
| 21 | Lee Kang-seok | South Korea | 11 | i | 1:44.09 | 21 | | | | | | |
| 22 | Roman Krech | Kazakhstan | 1 | o | DQ | | | | | | | |
| 23 | Brian Hansen | United States | 4 | i | DQ | | | | | | | |
| 24 | Pekka Koskela | Finland | 7 | i | DNF | | | | | | | |
