= 2013–14 ISU Speed Skating World Cup – Women's mass start =

The women's mass start in the 2013–14 ISU Speed Skating World Cup was contested over two races on two occasions, out of a total of six World Cup occasions for the season, with the first occasion involving the event taking place in Inzell, Germany, on 7–9 March 2014, and the second occasion taking place in Heerenveen, Netherlands, on 14–16 March 2014. The races were over 15 laps.

Francesca Lollobrigida of Italy won the cup, while Irene Schouten of the Netherlands came second, and Janneke Ensing of the Netherlands came third. The defending champion, Kim Bo-reum of South Korea, did not participate this season.

== Top three ==
Position	Athlete	Points	Previous season
1	(Italy) Francesca Lollobrigida	200	6th
2	(Netherlands) Irene Schouten	190	4th
3	(Netherlands) Janneke Ensing	155	–

== Race medallists ==
Occasion #	Location	Date	Gold	Race points	Silver	Race points	Bronze	Race points	Report
5	Inzell, Germany	9 March	Claudia Pechstein; Germany	34	Janneke Ensing; Netherlands	26	Irene Schouten; Netherlands	13	
6	Heerenveen, Netherlands	14 March	Francesca Lollobrigida; Italy	35	Irene Schouten; Netherlands	16	Ivanie Blondin; Canada	12	

== Standings ==
Standings as of 14 March 2014 (end of the season).

#	Name	Nat.	INZ	HVN	Total
1	Francesca Lollobrigida	(Italy)	50	150	200
2	Irene Schouten	(Netherlands)	70	120	190
3	Janneke Ensing	(Netherlands)	80	75	155
4	Ivanie Blondin	(Canada)	45	105	150
5	Mariska Huisman	(Netherlands)	60	90	150
6	Claudia Pechstein	(Germany)	100	45	145
7	Maria Lamb	(United States)	40	40	80
8	Jelena Peeters	(Belgium)	32	36	68
9	Masako Hozumi	(Japan)	36	32	68
10	Saskia Alusalu	(Estonia)	28		28
11	Camilla Hallås-Farestveit	(Norway)	24		24
12	Shoko Fujimura	(Japan)	21		21
13	Isabell Ost	(Germany)	18		18
14	Nana Takagi	(Japan)	16		16
15	Anna Ringsred	(United States)	14		14
15	Luiza Złotkowska	(Poland)	14		14
17	Roxanne Dufter	(Germany)	10		10
