= Kolomna Speed Skating Center =

Speed skating rink in Kolomna, Russia

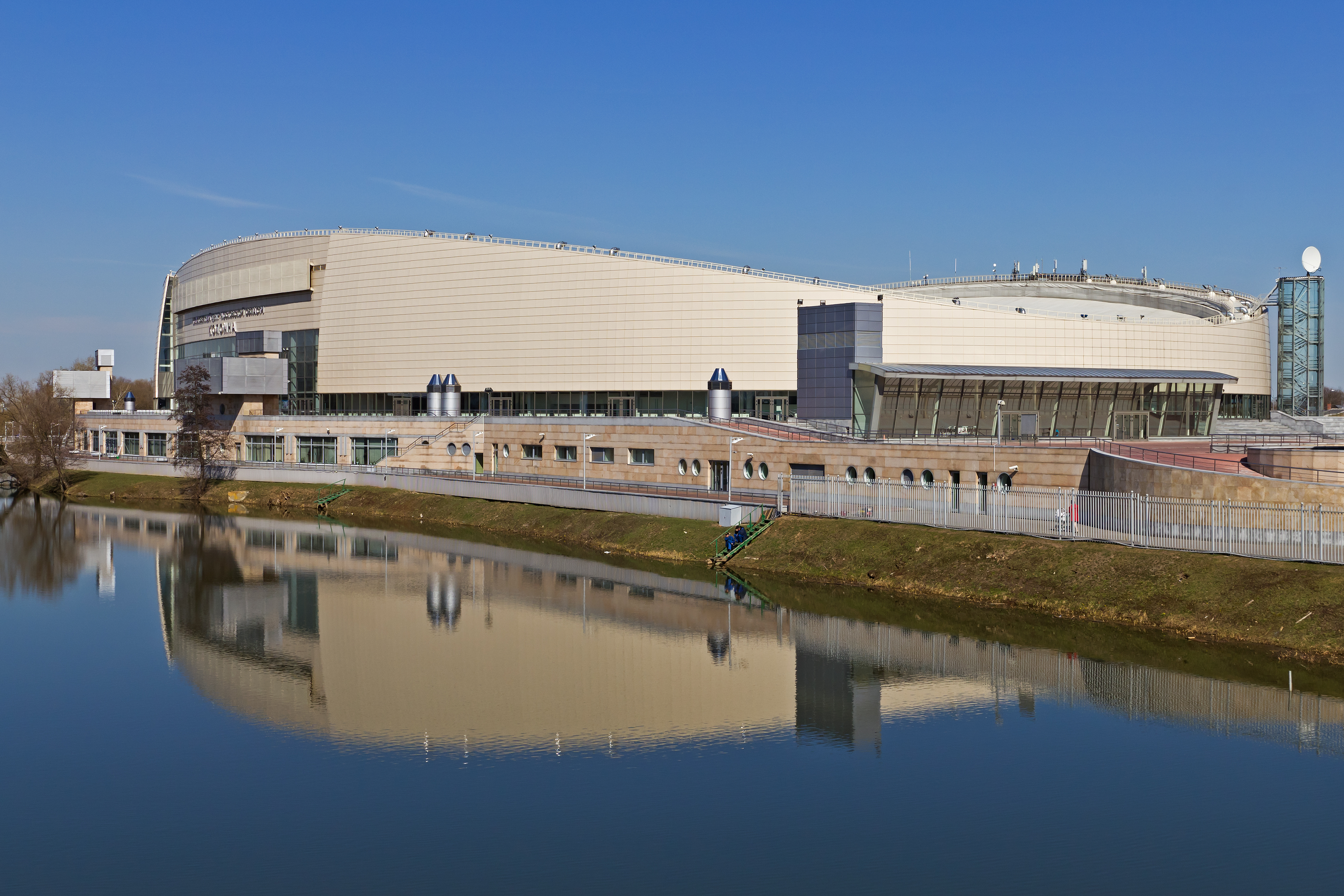
- Outside view
- Interactive map of Kolomna Speed Skating Center
- Location: Kolomna, Russia
- Coordinates: 55°06′23″N 38°45′06″E
- Capacity: 6,150

Construction
- Opened: 31 May 2006
- Cost: €150 million

Tenants
- 2008 European Championships; 2007–08 ISU World Cup 3; 2008–09 ISU World Cup 6; 2012–13 ISU World Cup 2

The Kolomna Speed Skating Center (Russian: Коломенский центр конькобежного спорта) is a 6,150-seat indoor speed skating oval in Kolomna, Russia, also known as the Kometa Ice Rink. It opened in May 2006.

It cost €150 million to build the venue. The venue hosted the 2008 European Speed Skating Championships in January 2008 as well as World Cup events in 2007, 2009 and 2013.

It hosted the 2016 World Single Distance Speed Skating Championships on 11–14 February 2016.

== Track records ==
=== Men ===
Distance	Skater	Time	Date	Event
500 m	(Russia) Dmitri Lobkov	34.35	10 February 2014	RussiaCup 2007
1000 m	(Canada) Denny Morrison	1:08.53	24 January 2009	2008–09 World Cup
1500 m	(Russia) Yevgeny Lalenkov	1:45.24	15 February 2008	2008 European
3000 m	(Russia) Ivan Skobrev	3:43.73	16 December 2006	Test competition
5000 m	(Netherlands) Sven Kramer	6:10.62	24 November 2012	2012–13 World Cup
10000 m	(Netherlands) Sven Kramer	12:56.77	11 February 2016	2016 ISU World Single Distances Championship 2016
Team pursuit (8 laps)	Russia	3:52.66	25 December 2009	Russian Championships
Combination	Skater	Points	Date	Match
2 x 500 m	(Russia) Dmitri Lobkov	69.480	22–23 March 2007	2007 Russian Championships
Sprint	(Japan) Tadashi Obara	140.840	24–25 January 2009	2008–09 World Cup
Big	(Netherlands) Sven Kramer	147.716	12–13 December 2008	2008 European

=== Women ===
Distance	Skater	Time	Date	Event
500 m	(Germany) Jenny Wolf	37.51	24 January 2009	2008–09 World Cup
1000 m	(Netherlands) Margot Boer	1:15.79	24 January 2009	2008–09 World Cup
1500 m	(Netherlands) Marrit Leenstra	1:55.03	24 November 2012	2012–13 World Cup
3000 m	(Czech Republic) Martina Sáblíková	4:01.67	12 January 2008	2008 European
5000 m	(Czech Republic) Martina Sáblíková	6:53.42	13 January 2008	2008 European
Team pursuit (6 laps)	Russia	2:58.05	20 March 2008	2007 Russian Championships
Combination	Skater	Points	Date	Match
2 x 500 m	(Russia) Svetlana Kaykan	76.500	22–23 March 2007	2007 Russian Championships
Sprint	(China) Yu Jing	152.575	24–25 January 2009	2008–09 World Cup
Small	(Netherlands) Ireen Wüst	160.553	12–13 January 2008	2008 European

Source: www.speedskatingnews.info
