= 2011–12 ISU Speed Skating World Cup – Men's team pursuit =

World skate tournament

The men's team pursuit in the 2011–12 ISU Speed Skating World Cup was contested over four races on four occasions, out of a total of seven World Cup occasions for the season, with the first occasion taking place in Chelyabinsk, Russia, on 18–20 November 2011, and the final occasion taking place in Berlin, Germany, on 9–11 March 2012.

The Netherlands won the cup, while South Korea came second and Germany came third. The defending champions, Norway, ended up in 8th place.

== Top three ==
Medal	Country	Points	Previous season
Gold	Netherlands	374	8th
Silver	South Korea	340	13th
Bronze	Germany	300	5th

== Race medallists ==
Occasion #	Location	Date	Gold	Time	Silver	Time	Bronze	Time	Report
1	Chelyabinsk, Russia	20 November	Netherlands; Sven Kramer; Jan Blokhuijsen; Wouter olde Heuvel	3:41.25	United States; Shani Davis; Jonathan Kuck; Brian Hansen	3:44.52	Germany; Patrick Beckert; Marco Weber; Alexej Baumgartner	3:45.29	
3	Heerenveen, Netherlands	4 December	Netherlands; Sven Kramer; Wouter olde Heuvel; Jan Blokhuijsen	3:42.35	South Korea; Lee Seung-hoon; Ko Byung-wook; Joo Hyong-jun	3:43.82	Germany; Patrick Beckert; Alexej Baumgartner; Marco Weber	3:45.28	
5	Hamar, Norway	12 February	Russia; Ivan Skobrev; Yevgeny Lalenkov; Denis Yuskov	3:45.42	South Korea; Joo Hyong-jun; Ko Byung-wook; Lee Seung-hoon	3:46.68	Germany; Robert Lehmann; Alexej Baumgartner; Patrick Beckert	3:46.87	
7	Berlin, Germany	11 March	Netherlands; Koen Verweij; Jan Blokhuijsen; Douwe de Vries	3:43.94	South Korea; Lee Seung-hoon; Joo Hyong-jun; Ko Byung-wook	3:44.04	United States; Shani Davis; Brian Hansen; Jonathan Kuck	3:45.44	

== Standings ==
Standings as of 11 March 2012 (end of the season).

#	Name	CHE	HVN	HAM	BER	Total
1	Netherlands	100	100	24	150	374
2	South Korea	60	80	80	120	340
3	Germany	70	70	70	90	300
4	United States	80	36	60	105	281
5	Russia	50	0	100	–	150
6	Poland	36	60	45	–	141
7	Canada	32	50	50	–	132
8	Norway	45	28	40	–	113
9	Italy	28	45	36	–	109
10	Czech Republic	21	32	28	–	81
11	Japan	0	40	32	–	72
12	France	40	–	–	–	40
13	Kazakhstan	24	–	–	–	24
