= 2012–13 ISU Speed Skating World Cup – World Cup 6 =

The sixth competition weekend of the 2012–13 ISU Speed Skating World Cup was held in the Olympic Oval in Calgary, Alberta, Canada, from Saturday, 19 January, until Sunday, 20 January 2013.

On the second day of the competition, South Korean Lee Sang-hwa set a new world record of 36.80 seconds in the women's 500 metres.

== Schedule of events ==
Schedule of the event:

Date	Time	Events
19 January	12:00 MST	500 m women 500 m men 1000 m women 1000 m men
20 January	11:45 MST	500 m women 500 m men 1000 m women 1000 m men

== Medal summary ==
=== Men's events ===
Event	Race #	Gold	Time	Silver	Time	Bronze	Time	Report
500 m	1	Jan Smeekens; Netherlands	34.32	Pekka Koskela; Finland	34.361	Jamie Gregg; Canada	34.369	
500 m	2	Jan Smeekens; Netherlands	34.39	Joji Kato; Japan	34.44	Michel Mulder; Netherlands	34.55	
1000 m	1	Shani Davis; United States	1:07.49	Kjeld Nuis; Netherlands	1:07.64	Michel Mulder; Netherlands	1:07.87	
1000 m	2	Hein Otterspeer; Netherlands	1:07.76	Shani Davis; United States	1:07.83	Samuel Schwarz; Germany	1:07.85	

=== Women's events ===
Event	Race #	Gold	Time	Silver	Time	Bronze	Time	Report
500 m	1	Lee Sang-hwa; South Korea	36.99	Heather Richardson; United States	37.12	Yu Jing; China	37.28	
500 m	2	Lee Sang-hwa; South Korea	36.80 WR	Heather Richardson; United States	37.42	Margot Boer; Netherlands	37.54	
1000 m	1	Heather Richardson; United States	1:13.09	Christine Nesbitt; Canada	1:13.67	Brittany Bowe; United States	1:13.92	
1000 m	2	Heather Richardson; United States	1:13.30	Ireen Wüst; Netherlands	1:13.89	Brittany Bowe; United States	1:13.96	
