= 2012–13 ISU Speed Skating World Cup – World Cup 5 =

The fifth competition weekend of the 2012–13 ISU Speed Skating World Cup was held in the Heilongjiang Indoor Rink in Harbin, China, from Saturday, 15 December, until Sunday, 16 December 2012.

== Schedule of events ==
Schedule of the event:

Date	Time	Events
15 December	15:00 CN	500 m women 500 m men 1000 m women 1000 m men
16 December	15:00 CN	500 m women 500 m men 1000 m women 1000 m men

== Medal summary ==
=== Men's events ===
Event	Race #	Gold	Time	Silver	Time	Bronze	Time	Report
500 m	1	Jan Smeekens; Netherlands	35.15	Michel Mulder; Netherlands	35.20	Joji Kato; Japan	35.22	
500 m	2	Joji Kato; Japan	34.94	Ronald Mulder; Netherlands	35.21	Jan Smeekens; Netherlands	35.27	
1000 m	1	Shani Davis; United States	1:10.05	Hein Otterspeer; Netherlands	1:10.07	Samuel Schwarz; Germany	1:10.10	
1000 m	2	Samuel Schwarz; Germany	1:09.69	Shani Davis; United States	1:09.87	Hein Otterspeer; Netherlands	1:09.92	

=== Women's events ===
Event	Race #	Gold	Time	Silver	Time	Bronze	Time	Report
500 m	1	Lee Sang-hwa; South Korea	37.94	Jenny Wolf; Germany	37.95	Yu Jing; China	38.53	
500 m	2	Lee Sang-hwa; South Korea	37.65	Yu Jing; China	38.34	Nao Kodaira; Japan	38.38	
1000 m	1	Karolína Erbanová; Czech Republic	1:17.10	Zhang Hong; China	1:17.14	Margot Boer; Netherlands	1:17.35	
1000 m	2	Zhang Hong; China	1:16.717	Karolína Erbanová; Czech Republic	1:16.718	Olga Fatkulina; Russia	1:17.12	
