= 2012–13 ISU Speed Skating World Cup – World Cup 4 =

The fourth competition weekend of the 2012–13 ISU Speed Skating World Cup was held in the M-Wave arena in Nagano, Japan, from Saturday, 8 December, until Sunday, 9 December 2012.

== Schedule of events ==
Schedule of the event:

Date	Time	Events
8 December	14:50 JST	500 m women 500 m men 1000 m women 1000 m men
9 December	13:50 JST	500 m women 500 m men 1000 m women 1000 m men

== Medal summary ==
=== Men's events ===
Event	Race #	Gold	Time	Silver	Time	Bronze	Time	Report
500 m	1	Pekka Koskela; Finland	34.64	Michel Mulder; Netherlands	34.95	Tucker Fredricks; United States	35.10	
500 m	2	Keiichiro Nagashima; Japan	35.14	Gilmore Junio; Canada	35.16	Jan Smeekens; Netherlands	35.18	
1000 m	1	Pekka Koskela; Finland	1:09.52	Samuel Schwarz; Germany	1:09.69	Lee Kyou-hyuk; South Korea	1:09.85	
1000 m	2	Hein Otterspeer; Netherlands	1:09.20	Denny Morrison; Canada	1:09.64	Kjeld Nuis; Netherlands	1:09.72	

=== Women's events ===
Event	Race #	Gold	Time	Silver	Time	Bronze	Time	Report
500 m	1	Lee Sang-hwa; South Korea	37.63	Nao Kodaira; Japan	37.96	Heather Richardson; United States	38.01	
500 m	2	Lee Sang-hwa; South Korea	37.60	Jenny Wolf; Germany	37.91	Nao Kodaira; Japan	38.09	
1000 m	1	Heather Richardson; United States	1:15.24	Christine Nesbitt; Canada	1:15.45	Lotte van Beek; Netherlands	1:16.15	
1000 m	2	Christine Nesbitt; Canada	1:15.13	Heather Richardson; United States	1:15.26	Lotte van Beek; Netherlands	1:15.87	
