= Anna Ringsred =

American speed skater

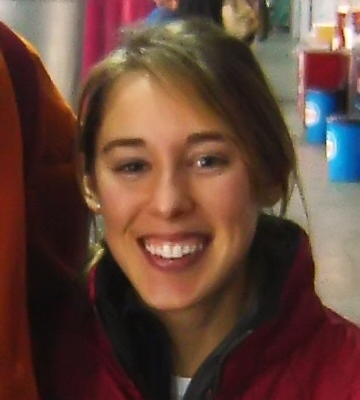
- Ringsred in 2006

Personal information
- Born: September 27, 1984 (age 41) Duluth, Minnesota
- Education: University of Calgary

Sport
- Country: United States
- Sport: Speed skating
- Coached by: Andrey Zhuikov

Anna Ringsred (born September 27, 1984) is an American speed skater who represented the United States at the 2014 Winter Olympics. She began speed skating at age 13 and made the United States junior team while in high school. In 2004, she qualified for the Junior World Allround Championships, placing 22nd. She qualified for World Championship events in 2007, 2008, and 2010, with her best finish being a fifth place in the 2007 team pursuit.

Ringsred had four third-place finishes at the 2010 National Championships, but was not selected to the 2010 Olympic team. She retired from speed skating at the end of the season, but launched a comeback effort in 2012. She made the 2013 Allround and Single Distance World Championship teams. Ringsred placed third in the 3000 meters at the 2013–2014 National Championships and followed it up with a second place in the event at the United States Olympic trials to make her first Olympic team. At the Olympics, she placed 26th in the 3000 meters.

== Early life ==
Anna Ringsred was born September 27, 1984, in Duluth, Minnesota. She was a ski jumper until she broke her ankle at age 13. At that time, she saw an ad for speed skating in the Duluth News Tribune and decided to give it a try.

Ringsred attended Montessori School of Duluth, and graduated from Duluth Marshall High School in 2003. After high school, she moved to Calgary, Alberta to train.

== Speed skating career ==
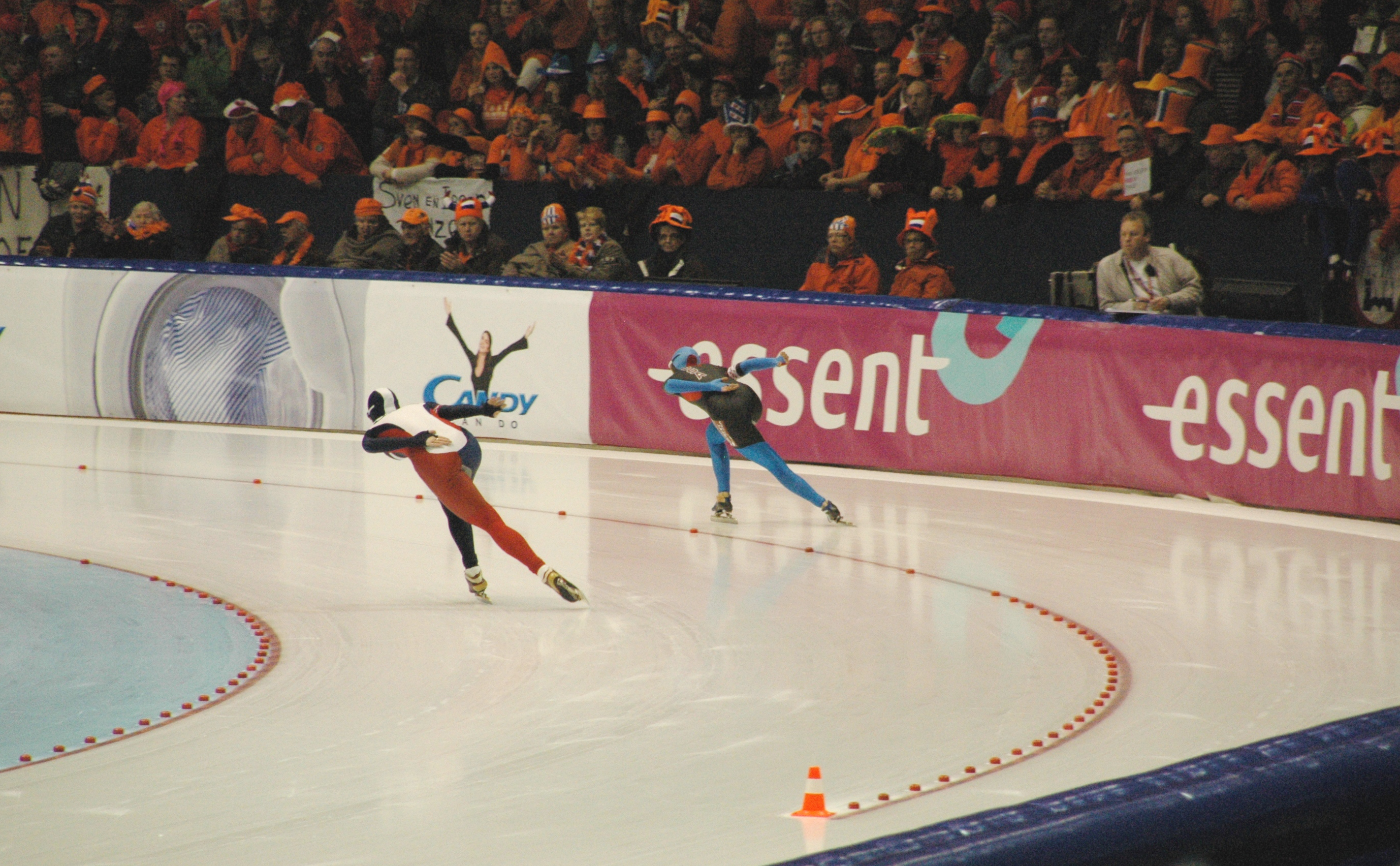
Ringsred (outside lane) and Karolína Erbanová make a turn during the 2010 World Allrounds

Rinsgred was named to the Junior National Team while in high school. At the 2004 Junior World Allround Championships, she placed 22nd. In 2007, she had a fifth-place finish at the World Championships in the team pursuit, and placed 15th in the 1500 meters. Ringsred qualified for the World Allround Championships in 2008 and 2010, placing 24th and 16th respectively.

Entering the 2010 National Championships/Olympic Trials, Ringsred was considered a favorite to make the Olympic Team. She set a personal best and placed third in the 500 meters. She placed third in 1000 meter, 1500 meter, and 5000 meter events, and fourth in the 3000 meters. Ringsred was not, however, selected to the Olympic team. After narrowly missing the team, she retired from speed skating, later explaining "I wasn't handling the pressure very well, and I was getting tired of training every day and pushing myself". She completed a degree in chemical engineering at University of Calgary and then spent time backpacking around Europe. She got a full-time job as an engineer in Calgary, but after a few months on the job she found she missed speed skating.

In 2012, Ringsred decided to return to speed skating to make one final try at the Olympics. She consulted with a sports psychologist to get better control of her nerves that had often made competition unpleasant. "I used to have a fear of racing," she explained. "It was always scary and nerve-racking ... [Now] I just go out there and forget about the results ... I sort of fell in love with it again." In the past, her best event was the 1000 meters, but after her comeback her best results have been in the distance events.

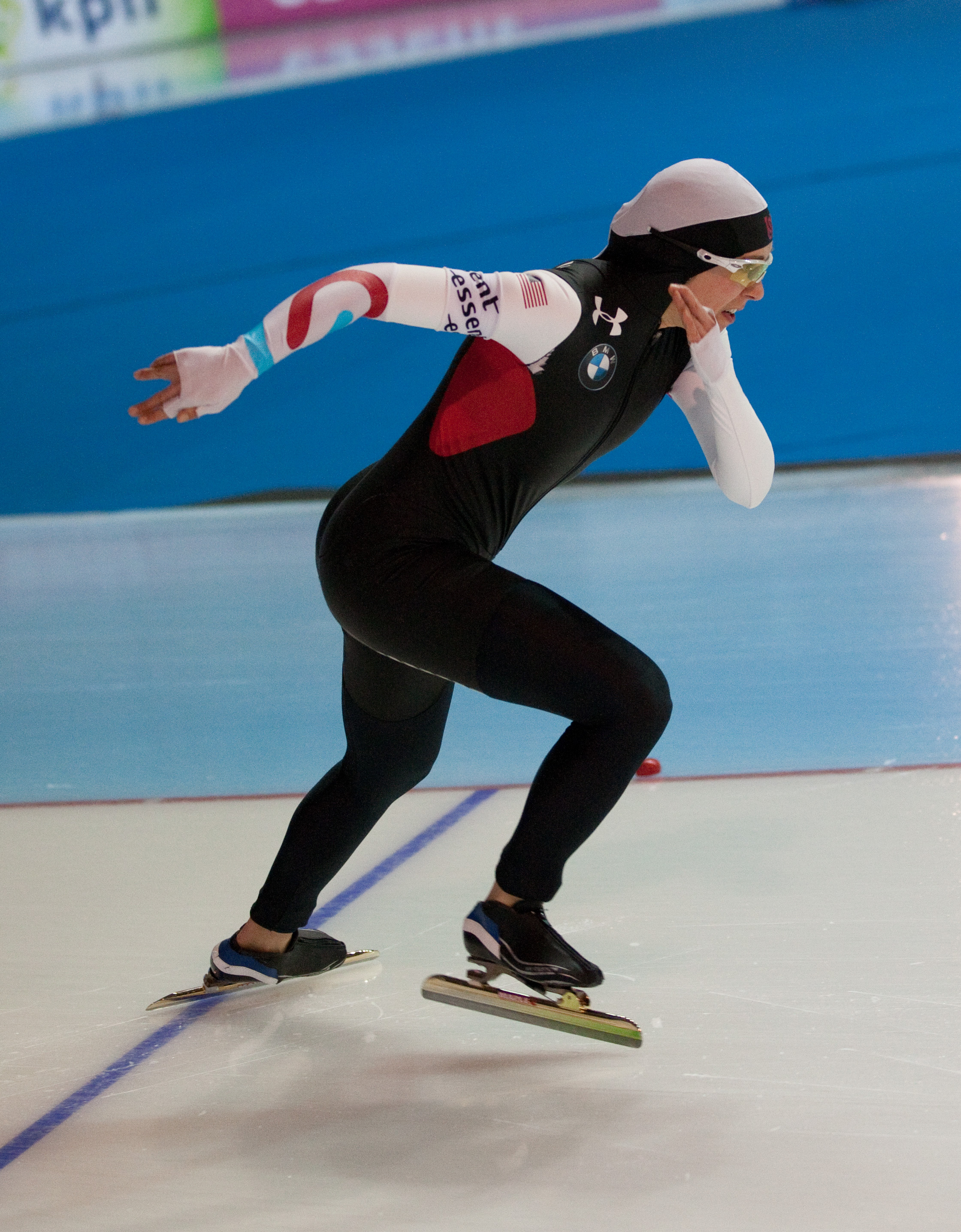
Ringsred accelerates out of her starting position during a 1500-meter race in 2013.

For the 2012–2013 season, Ringsred finished 37th overall in 1000 meter World Cup standings and 41st overall in the 1500 meters. Battling the flu, she placed 20th at the 2013 World Allround Speed Skating Championships. At the 2013 World Championships, she placed 21st in the 1000 meters and 18th in the 1500 meters. Ringsred placed third in the 3000 meters at the 2013–2014 National Championships.

Ringsred entered the 2014 United States Olympic Trials, planning to retire at the end of the season regardless of what happened in the Trials. In her first event, the 3000 meters, she placed second and qualified for the United States Olympic Team with a time of 4:13.80. "I was so scared going into this", she said afterwards. "A lot was at stake. This was my last chance. I can't believe it. I made it." Ringsred went on to compete in all five events at the Trials, placing in the top ten in all of them. She is no longer sure she will retire after the Olympics. "This puts her on the map, and with advanced training and coaching opportunities, who knows how far she can take it?" remarked her longtime coach Andrey Zhuikov. Prior to the Olympic Trials, Ringsred was considered a very good all-around skater, but not good enough at any given event to make the Olympics.

At the 2014 Winter Olympics, Ringsred finished the 3000 meter race in a time of 4:21.51. "(The ice) was slower than I expected," she said. "With the effort I was giving, I thought [my time] would be a bit faster ... I fought the whole way, so at least I'm happy with that." She placed 26th.

== Personal life ==
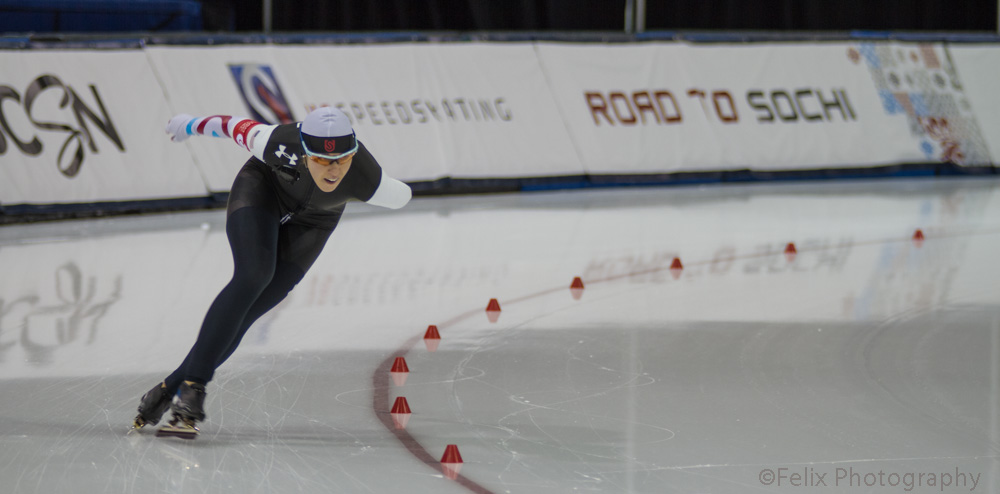
Ringsred skates the 5000 meters at the 2014 Olympic Trials.

Ringsred volunteers at the local homeless shelter in her spare time. She currently lives in Calgary.

== Personal records ==
Personal records
Women's speed skating
Event	Result	Date	Location	Notes
500 m	39.72	January 12, 2013	Utah Olympic Oval, Salt Lake City	
1000 m	1:16.71	January 20, 2013	Olympic Oval, Calgary	
1500 m	1:57.86	October 31, 2009	Olympic Oval, Calgary	
3000 m	4:12.49	November 15, 2013	Utah Olympic Oval, Salt Lake City	
5000 m	7:21.18	December 30, 2009	Utah Olympic Oval, Salt Lake City	
10000 m	24:02.20	June 29, 2008	Ushuaia, Argentina	
