= 2012–13 ISU Speed Skating World Cup – World Cup 3 =

The third competition weekend of the 2012–13 ISU Speed Skating World Cup was held in the Alau Ice Palace in Astana, Kazakhstan, from Saturday, 1 December, until Sunday, 2 December 2012.

== Schedule of events ==
Schedule of the event:

Date	Time	Events
1 December	15:00 BTT	1500 m men 5000 m women Team pursuit men
2 December	15:00 BTT	1500 m women 10000 m men Team pursuit women

== Medal summary ==
=== Men's events ===
Event	Gold	Time	Silver	Time	Bronze	Time	Report
1500 m	Shani Davis; United States	1:46.01	Håvard Bøkko; Norway	1:46.34	Zbigniew Bródka; Poland	1:46.42	
10000 m	Jorrit Bergsma; Netherlands	12:50.40	Bob de Jong; Netherlands	12:51.22	Lee Seung-hoon; South Korea	13:07.06	
Team pursuit	Netherlands; Jorrit Bergsma; Koen Verweij; Jan Blokhuijsen	3:41.27	South Korea; Lee Seung-hoon; Joo Hyung-joon; Kim Cheol-min	3:41.49	Norway; Håvard Bøkko; Sverre Lunde Pedersen; Simen Spieler Nilsen	3:43.43	

=== Women's events ===
Event	Gold	Time	Silver	Time	Bronze	Time	Report
1500 m	Christine Nesbitt; Canada	1:57.18	Marrit Leenstra; Netherlands	1:57.29	Linda de Vries; Netherlands	1:57.30	
5000 m	Martina Sáblíková; Czech Republic	7:00.75	Claudia Pechstein; Germany	7:01.05	Olga Graf; Russia	7:01.38	
Team pursuit	Canada; Ivanie Blondin; Christine Nesbitt; Brittany Schussler	2:58.40	South Korea; Kim Bo-reum; Noh Seon-yeong; Park Do-yeong	3:00.55	Netherlands; Marrit Leenstra; Diane Valkenburg; Linda de Vries	3:00.71	
