= 2012–13 ISU Speed Skating World Cup – World Cup 2 =

The second competition weekend of the 2012–13 ISU Speed Skating World Cup was held at the Kolomna Speed Skating Center in Kolomna, Russia, from Saturday, 24 November, until Sunday, 25 November 2012.

== Schedule of events ==
Schedule of the event:

Date	Time	Events
24 November	16:00 MSK	1500 m women 5000 m men Mass start women
25 November	16:00 MSK	1500 m men 3000 m women Mass start men

== Medal summary ==
=== Men's events ===
Event	Gold	Time	Silver	Time	Bronze	Time	Report
1500 m	Koen Verweij; Netherlands	1:45.56	Bart Swings; Belgium	1:45.77	Brian Hansen; United States	1:45.91	
5000 m	Sven Kramer; Netherlands	6:10.62	Jan Blokhuijsen; Netherlands	6:11.97	Jorrit Bergsma; Netherlands	6:13.08	
Mass start	Jorrit Bergsma; Netherlands	10:00.07	Ewen Fernandez; France	10:00.42	Alexis Contin; France	10:08.98	

=== Women's events ===
Event	Gold	Time	Silver	Time	Bronze	Time	Report
1500 m	Marrit Leenstra; Netherlands	1:55.03	Yekaterina Shikhova; Russia	1:55.52	Christine Nesbitt; Canada	1:56.16	
3000 m	Claudia Pechstein; Germany	4:02.31	Martina Sáblíková; Czech Republic	4:02.46	Marije Joling; Netherlands	4:03.90	
Mass start	Kim Bo-reum; South Korea	8:40.77	Ivanie Blondin; Canada	8:41.19	Mariska Huisman; Netherlands	8:40.90	

== Standings ==
The top ten standings in the contested cups after the weekend.

=== Men's cups ===
1500 m

#	Name	Nat.	HVN	KOL	Total
1	Maurice Vriend	(Netherlands)	100	45	145
2	Håvard Bøkko	(Norway)	80	50	130
3	Koen Verweij	(Netherlands)	28	100	128
4	Konrad Niedźwiedzki	(Poland)	60	60	120
5	Brian Hansen	(United States)	45	70	115
6	Bart Swings	(Belgium)	24	80	104
7	Sverre Lunde Pedersen	(Norway)	70	32	102
8	Zbigniew Bródka	(Poland)	50	40	90
9	Kjeld Nuis	(Netherlands)	32	36	68
10	Ivan Skobrev	(Russia)	40	21	61

5000/10000 m

#	Name	Nat.	HVN	KOL	Total
1	Sven Kramer	(Netherlands)	100	100	200
2	Jorrit Bergsma	(Netherlands)	80	70	150
2	Jan Blokhuijsen	(Netherlands)	70	80	150
4	Bob de Jong	(Netherlands)	60	60	120
5	Ivan Skobrev	(Russia)	50	35	85
6	Lee Seung-hoon	(South Korea)	32	50	82
7	Håvard Bøkko	(Norway)	35	45	80
8	Alexis Contin	(France)	40	30	70
8	Sverre Lunde Pedersen	(Norway)	30	40	70
10	Ted-Jan Bloemen	(Netherlands)	45	21	66

Mass start

#	Name	Nat.	HVN	KOL	Total
1	Jorrit Bergsma	(Netherlands)	45	100	145
2	Alexis Contin	(France)	70	70	140
3	Christijn Groeneveld	(Netherlands)	100	32	132
4	Arjan Stroetinga	(Netherlands)	80	45	125
5	Bart Swings	(Belgium)	60	40	100
6	Ewen Fernandez	(France)	19	80	99
7	Jordan Belchos	(Canada)	36	60	96
8	Marco Weber	(Germany)	40	50	90
9	Dmitry Babenko	(Kazakhstan)	50	24	74
10	Haralds Silovs	(Latvia)	14	36	50

=== Women's cups ===
1500 m

#	Name	Nat.	HVN	KOL	Total
1	Marrit Leenstra	(Netherlands)	80	100	180
2	Christine Nesbitt	(Canada)	100	70	170
3	Martina Sáblíková	(Czech Republic)	50	60	110
4	Claudia Pechstein	(Germany)	60	28	88
5	Yekaterina Shikhova	(Russia)	–	80	80
6	Olga Graf	(Russia)	32	45	77
6	Marije Joling	(Netherlands)	45	32	77
8	Kim Bo-reum	(South Korea)	25	50	75
9	Lotte van Beek	(Netherlands)	70	0	70
10	Yekaterina Lobysheva	(Russia)	24	40	64

3000/5000 m

#	Name	Nat.	HVN	KOL	Total
1	Stephanie Beckert	(Germany)	100	60	160
1	Martina Sáblíková	(Czech Republic)	80	80	160
3	Claudia Pechstein	(Russia)	21	100	121
4	Marije Joling	(Netherlands)	45	70	115
5	Diane Valkenburg	(Netherlands)	60	50	110
6	Olga Graf	(Russia)	50	35	85
7	Kim Bo-reum	(South Korea)	32	40	72
8	Antoinette de Jong	(Netherlands)	40	30	70
8	Jorien Ter Mors	(Netherlands)	70	–	70
10	Katarzyna Bachleda-Curuś	(Poland)	27	25	52

Mass start

#	Name	Nat.	HVN	KOL	Total
1	Mariska Huisman	(Netherlands)	100	70	170
2	Kim Bo-reum	(South Korea)	60	100	160
3	Ivanie Blondin	(Canada)	50	80	130
3	Claudia Pechstein	(Germany)	70	60	130
5	Park Do-yeong	(South Korea)	45	50	95
6	Bente Kraus	(Germany)	40	40	80
6	Jorien Ter Mors	(Netherlands)	80	–	80
8	Viktoriya Rusalyova	(Russia)	8	45	53
9	Francesca Bettrone	(Italy)	–	36	36
9	Karolina Domanska-Ksyt	(Poland)	36	–	36
9	Brianne Tutt	(Canada)	18	18	36
