= 2012–13 ISU Speed Skating World Cup – World Cup 7 =

The seventh competition weekend of the 2012–13 ISU Speed Skating World Cup was held in the Eisstadion Inzell in Inzell, Germany, from Saturday, 9 February, until Sunday, 10 February 2013.

== Schedule of events ==
Schedule of the event:

Date	Time	Events
9 February	12:10 CET	1500 m women 5000 m men Mass start women
10 February	11:00 CET	1500 m men 3000 m women Mass start men

== Medal summary ==
=== Men's events ===
Event	Gold	Time	Silver	Time	Bronze	Time	Report
1500 m	Denis Yuskov; Russia	1:46.07	Zbigniew Bródka; Poland	1:46.09	Brian Hansen; United States	1:46.14	
5000 m	Sven Kramer; Netherlands	6:11.76	Bob de Jong; Netherlands	6:14.08	Jorrit Bergsma; Netherlands	6:14.55	
Mass start	Arjan Stroetinga; Netherlands	9:57.56	Haralds Silovs; Latvia	9:58.93	Christijn Groeneveld; Netherlands	9:59.80	

=== Women's events ===
Event	Gold	Time	Silver	Time	Bronze	Time	Report
1500 m	Ireen Wüst; Netherlands	1:55.95	Diane Valkenburg; Netherlands	1:56.42	Yekaterina Shikhova; Russia	1:57.07	
3000 m	Ireen Wüst; Netherlands	4:02.23	Diane Valkenburg; Netherlands	4:05.31	Martina Sáblíková; Czech Republic	4:05.41	
Mass start	Kim Bo-reum; South Korea	8:13.80	Francesca Lollobrigida; Italy	8:14.10	Mariska Huisman; Netherlands	8:14.11	
