= 2012–13 ISU Speed Skating World Cup – World Cup 1 =

The first competition weekend of the 2012–13 ISU Speed Skating World Cup was held in the Thialf arena in Heerenveen, Netherlands, from Friday, 16 November, until Sunday, 18 November 2012.

== Schedule of events ==
Schedule of the event:

Date	Time	Events
16 November	16:00 CET	3000 m women 500 m women 5000 m men
17 November	14:00 CET	500 m men 500 m women 1000 m men 1500 m women Team pursuit men Mass start women
18 November	14:00 CET	500 m men 1000 m women 1500 m men Team pursuit women Mass start men

== Medal summary ==
=== Men's events ===
Event	Race #	Gold	Time	Silver	Time	Bronze	Time	Report
500 m	1	Pekka Koskela; Finland	34.96	Artur Waś; Poland	34.98	Jan Smeekens; Netherlands	35.07	
500 m	2	Joji Kato; Japan	34.98	Jan Smeekens; Netherlands	35.04	Mo Tae-bum; South Korea	35.15	
1000 m		Denny Morrison; Canada	1:09.43	Pekka Koskela; Finland	1:09.51	Kjeld Nuis; Netherlands	1:09.53	
1500 m		Maurice Vriend; Netherlands	1:46.13	Håvard Bøkko; Norway	1:46.40	Sverre Lunde Pedersen; Norway	1:46.54	
5000 m		Sven Kramer; Netherlands	6:16.09	Jorrit Bergsma; Netherlands	6:16.78	Jan Blokhuijsen; Netherlands	6:16.81	
Mass start		Christijn Groeneveld; Netherlands	10:14.55	Arjan Stroetinga; Netherlands	10:14.61	Alexis Contin; France	10:14.67	
Team pursuit		Netherlands; Jan Blokhuijsen; Sven Kramer; Koen Verweij	3:39.76	Russia; Yevgeny Lalenkov; Ivan Skobrev; Denis Yuskov	3:42.90	South Korea; Joo Hyung-joon; Ko Byung-wook; Lee Seung-hoon	3:43.57	

=== Women's events ===
Event	Race #	Gold	Time	Silver	Time	Bronze	Time	Report
500 m	1	Lee Sang-hwa; South Korea	37.85	Heather Richardson; United States	37.95	Nao Kodaira; Japan	38.26	
500 m	2	Lee Sang-hwa; South Korea	37.92	Heather Richardson; United States	38.13	Jenny Wolf; Germany	38.14	
1000 m		Heather Richardson; United States	1:15.27	Zhang Hong; China	1:15.41	Lotte van Beek; Netherlands	1:15.83	
1500 m		Christine Nesbitt; Canada	1:56.35	Marrit Leenstra; Netherlands	1:56.42	Lotte van Beek; Netherlands	1:57.42	
3000 m		Stephanie Beckert; Germany	4:04.39	Martina Sáblíková; Czech Republic	4:06.71	Jorien Ter Mors; Netherlands	4:06.90	
Mass start		Mariska Huisman; Netherlands	8:22.96	Jorien Ter Mors; Netherlands	8:22.97	Claudia Pechstein; Germany	8:23.05	
Team pursuit		Germany; Stephanie Beckert; Isabell Ost; Claudia Pechstein	3:01.14	Netherlands; Marije Joling; Marrit Leenstra; Diane Valkenburg	3:02.332	Canada; Ivanie Blondin; Christine Nesbitt; Brittany Schussler	3:02.337	

== Standings ==
The top ten standings in the contested cups after the weekend. The top five nations in the team pursuit cups.

=== Men's cups ===
500 m

#	Name	Nat.	HVN1	HVN2	Total
1	Joji Kato	(Japan)	50	100	150
1	Jan Smeekens	(Netherlands)	70	80	150
3	Mo Tae-bum	(South Korea)	60	70	130
3	Artur Waś	(Poland)	80	50	130
5	Pekka Koskela	(Finland)	100	0	100
6	Gilmore Junio	(Canada)	32	60	92
7	Keiichiro Nagashima	(Japan)	24	45	69
8	Jamie Gregg	(Canada)	40	25	65
9	Alex Boisvert-Lacroix	(Canada)	32	28	60
10	Hein Otterspeer	(Netherlands)	40	18	58

1000 m

#	Name	Nat.	HVN	Total
1	Denny Morrison	(Canada)	100	100
2	Pekka Koskela	(Finland)	80	80
3	Kjeld Nuis	(Netherlands)	70	70
4	Pim Schipper	(Netherlands)	60	60
5	Hein Otterspeer	(Netherlands)	50	50
6	Aleksey Yesin	(Russia)	45	45
7	Brian Hansen	(United States)	40	40
8	Lee Kyou-hyuk	(South Korea)	36	36
9	Sjoerd de Vries	(Netherlands)	32	32
10	Samuel Schwarz	(Germany)	28	28

1500 m

#	Name	Nat.	HVN	Total
1	Maurice Vriend	(Netherlands)	100	100
2	Håvard Bøkko	(Norway)	80	80
3	Sverre Lunde Pedersen	(Norway)	70	70
4	Konrad Niedźwiedzki	(Poland)	60	60
5	Zbigniew Bródka	(Poland)	50	50
6	Brian Hansen	(United States)	45	45
7	Ivan Skobrev	(Russia)	40	40
8	Denis Yuskov	(Russia)	36	36
9	Kjeld Nuis	(Netherlands)	32	32
10	Koen Verweij	(Netherlands)	28	28

5000/10000 m

#	Name	Nat.	HVN	Total
1	Sven Kramer	(Netherlands)	100	100
2	Jorrit Bergsma	(Netherlands)	80	80
3	Jan Blokhuijsen	(Netherlands)	70	70
4	Bob de Jong	(Netherlands)	60	60
5	Ivan Skobrev	(Russia)	50	50
6	Ted-Jan Bloemen	(Netherlands)	45	45
7	Alexis Contin	(France)	40	40
8	Håvard Bøkko	(Norway)	35	35
9	Lee Seung-hoon	(South Korea)	32	32
10	Sverre Lunde Pedersen	(Norway)	30	30

Mass start

#	Name	Nat.	HVN	Total
1	Christijn Groeneveld	(Netherlands)	100	100
2	Arjan Stroetinga	(Netherlands)	80	80
3	Alexis Contin	(France)	70	70
4	Bart Swings	(Belgium)	60	60
5	Dmitry Babenko	(Kazakhstan)	50	50
6	Jorrit Bergsma	(Netherlands)	45	45
7	Marco Weber	(Germany)	40	40
8	Jordan Belchos	(Canada)	36	36
9	Fredrik van der Horst	(Norway)	32	32
10	Tyler Derraugh	(Canada)	28	28

Team pursuit

#	Name	HVN1	Total
1	Netherlands	100	100
2	Russia	80	80
3	South Korea	70	70
4	Canada	60	60
5	Germany	50	50

=== Women's cups ===
500 m

#	Name	Nat.	HVN1	HVN2	Total
1	Lee Sang-hwa	(South Korea)	100	100	200
2	Heather Richardson	(United States)	80	80	160
3	Jenny Wolf	(Germany)	50	70	120
3	Zhang Hong	(China)	60	60	120
5	Nao Kodaira	(Japan)	70	36	106
6	Yu Jing	(China)	45	50	95
7	Margot Boer	(Netherlands)	32	45	77
8	Olga Fatkulina	(Russia)	40	32	72
9	Wang Beixing	(China)	18	40	58
10	Karolína Erbanová	(Czech Republic)	28	28	56

1000 m

#	Name	Nat.	HVN	Total
1	Heather Richardson	(United States)	100	100
2	Zhang Hong	(China)	80	80
3	Lotte van Beek	(Netherlands)	70	70
4	Marrit Leenstra	(Netherlands)	60	60
5	Laurine van Riessen	(Netherlands)	50	50
6	Brittany Bowe	(United States)	45	45
7	Karolína Erbanová	(Czech Republic)	40	40
8	Yekaterina Aydova	(Kazakhstan)	36	36
9	Yu Jing	(China)	32	32
10	Christine Nesbitt	(Canada)	28	28

1500 m

#	Name	Nat.	HVN	Total
1	Christine Nesbitt	(Canada)	100	100
2	Marrit Leenstra	(Netherlands)	80	80
3	Lotte van Beek	(Netherlands)	70	70
4	Claudia Pechstein	(Germany)	60	60
5	Martina Sáblíková	(Czech Republic)	50	50
6	Marije Joling	(Netherlands)	45	45
7	Laurine van Riessen	(Netherlands)	40	40
8	Ida Njåtun	(Norway)	36	36
9	Olga Graf	(Russia)	32	32
10	Brittany Schussler	(Canada)	28	28

3000/5000 m

#	Name	Nat.	HVN	Total
1	Stephanie Beckert	(Germany)	100	100
2	Martina Sáblíková	(Czech Republic)	80	80
3	Jorien Ter Mors	(Netherlands)	70	70
4	Diane Valkenburg	(Netherlands)	60	60
5	Olga Graf	(Russia)	50	50
6	Marije Joling	(Netherlands)	45	45
7	Antoinette de Jong	(Netherlands)	40	40
8	Ireen Wüst	(Netherlands)	35	35
9	Kim Bo-reum	(South Korea)	32	32
10	Ida Njåtun	(Norway)	30	30

Mass start

#	Name	Nat.	HVN	Total
1	Mariska Huisman	(Netherlands)	100	100
2	Jorien Ter Mors	(Netherlands)	80	80
3	Claudia Pechstein	(Germany)	70	70
4	Kim Bo-reum	(South Korea)	60	60
5	Ivanie Blondin	(Canada)	50	50
6	Park Do-yeong	(South Korea)	45	45
7	Bente Kraus	(Germany)	40	40
8	Karolina Domanska-Ksyt	(Poland)	36	36
9	Jelena Peeters	(Belgium)	32	32
10	Lim Yung-soo	(South Korea)	28	28

Team pursuit

#	Name	HVN1	Total
1	Germany	100	100
2	Netherlands	80	80
3	Canada	70	70
4	Poland	60	60
5	South Korea	50	50
