= 2012–13 ISU Speed Skating World Cup – World Cup 8 =

The eighth competition weekend of the 2012–13 ISU Speed Skating World Cup was held in the Gunda Niemann-Stirnemann Halle in Erfurt, Germany, from Friday, 1 March, until Sunday, 3 March 2013.

== Schedule of events ==
Schedule of the event:

Date	Time	Events
1 March	15:00 CET	500 m women 10000 m men 5000 m women
2 March	12:30 CET	500 m men 500 m women 1000 m men 1500 m women Team pursuit men
3 March	12:30 CET	500 m men 1000 m women 1500 m men Team pursuit women

== Medal summary ==
=== Men's events ===
Event	Race #	Gold	Time	Silver	Time	Bronze	Time	Report
500 m	1	Jan Smeekens; Netherlands	35.06	Joji Kato; Japan	35.16	Ronald Mulder; Netherlands	35.28	
500 m	2	Jan Smeekens; Netherlands	34.96	Joji Kato; Japan	35.05	Ronald Mulder; Netherlands	35.28	
1000 m		Brian Hansen; United States	1:09.79	Stefan Groothuis; Netherlands	1:09.84	Dmitry Lobkov; Russia; Nico Ihle; Germany	1:10.18	
1500 m		Zbigniew Bródka; Poland	1:46.88	Haralds Silovs; Latvia	1:46.98	Brian Hansen; United States	1:47.01	
10000 m		Bob de Jong; Netherlands	12:53.56	Jorrit Bergsma; Netherlands	12:55.36	Lee Seung-hoon; South Korea	13:19.84	
Team pursuit		Netherlands; Sven Kramer; Jorrit Bergsma; Koen Verweij	3:45.21	South Korea; Lee Seung-hoon; Ko Byung-wook; Kim Cheol-min	3:45.33	Poland; Zbigniew Bródka; Konrad Niedźwiedzki; Jan Szymański	3:45.79	

=== Women's events ===
Event	Race #	Gold	Time	Silver	Time	Bronze	Time	Report
500 m	1	Wang Beixing; China	38.07	Thijsje Oenema; Netherlands	38.34	Jenny Wolf; Germany	38.39	
500 m	2	Wang Beixing; China	38.15	Olga Fatkulina; Russia	38.215	Thijsje Oenema; Netherlands	38.217	
1000 m		Brittany Bowe; United States	1:15.34	Ireen Wüst; Netherlands	1:15.74	Olga Fatkulina; Russia	1:15.79	
1500 m		Ireen Wüst; Netherlands	1:55.61	Diane Valkenburg; Netherlands	1:58.32	Marrit Leenstra; Netherlands	1:58.38	
5000 m		Martina Sáblíková; Czech Republic	7:01.33	Stephanie Beckert; Germany	7:02.84	Claudia Pechstein; Germany	7:06.96	
Team pursuit		Netherlands; Marrit Leenstra; Diane Valkenburg; Ireen Wüst	3:02.83	Canada; Ivanie Blondin; Kali Christ; Cindy Klassen	3:04.34	Poland; Katarzyna Bachleda-Curuś; Natalia Czerwonka; Luiza Złotkowska	3:05.23	
