= 2012–13 ISU Speed Skating World Cup – World Cup 9 =

The ninth and final competition weekend 2012–13 ISU Speed Skating World Cup was held in the Thialf arena in Heerenveen, Netherlands, from Friday, 8 March, until Sunday, 10 March 2013.

== Schedule of events ==
Schedule of the event:

Date	Time	Events
8 March	18:00 CET	500 m women 500 m men Team pursuit women Team pursuit men
9 March	13:15 CET	1000 m women 1000 m men 3000 m women 5000 m men
10 March	14:00 CET	500 m women 500 m men 1500 m women 1500 m men Mass start women Mass start men

== Medal summary ==
=== Men's events ===
Event	Race #	Gold	Time	Silver	Time	Bronze	Time	Report
500 m	1	Jan Smeekens; Netherlands	34.84	Jamie Gregg; Canada	34.96	Ronald Mulder; Netherlands	35.04	
500 m	2	Jan Smeekens; Netherlands	34.83	Joji Kato; Japan	34.92	Michel Mulder; Netherlands	34.97	
1000 m		Stefan Groothuis; Netherlands	1:08.91	Mark Tuitert; Netherlands	1:09.22	Kjeld Nuis; Netherlands	1:09.240	
1500 m		Bart Swings; Belgium	1:45.50	Zbigniew Bródka; Poland	1:45.96	Shani Davis; United States	1:46.13	
5000 m		Sven Kramer; Netherlands	6:10.78	Jorrit Bergsma; Netherlands	6:15.74	Bob de Jong; Netherlands	6:18.26	
Mass start		Bart Swings; Belgium	10:32.32	Joo Hyung-joon; South Korea	10:32.37	Arjan Stroetinga; Netherlands	10:32.40	
Team pursuit		Netherlands; Jan Blokhuijsen; Sven Kramer; Koen Verweij; Jorrit Bergsma	3:40.64	South Korea; Joo Hyung-joon; Ko Byung-wook; Lee Seung-hoon; Kim Cheol-min	3:42.69	Russia; Yevgeny Lalenkov; Ivan Skobrev; Denis Yuskov	3:43.02	

=== Women's events ===
Event	Race #	Gold	Time	Silver	Time	Bronze	Time	Report
500 m	1	Jenny Wolf; Germany	37.77	Wang Beixing; China	37.81	Lee Sang-hwa; South Korea	37.82	
500 m	2	Lee Sang-hwa; South Korea	37.77	Wang Beixing; China	37.78	Thijsje Oenema; Netherlands	38.10	
1000 m		Christine Nesbitt; Canada	1:15.48	Zhang Hong; China	1:15.50	Laurine van Riessen; Netherlands	1:15.95	
1500 m		Ireen Wüst; Netherlands	1:54.67	Lotte van Beek; Netherlands	1:56.58	Christine Nesbitt; Canada	1:56.86	
3000 m		Ireen Wüst; Netherlands	3:58.68	Diane Valkenburg; Netherlands	4:04.75	Linda de Vries; Netherlands	4:04.87	
Mass start		Irene Schouten; Netherlands	9:14.26	Ivanie Blondin; Canada	9:14.29	Kim Bo-reum; South Korea	9:14.38	
Team pursuit		Netherlands; Marrit Leenstra; Linda de Vries; Ireen Wüst; Diane Valkenburg	3:00.50	Canada; Kali Christ; Christine Nesbitt; Brittany Schussler; Ivanie Blondin	3:03.50	Poland; Katarzyna Bachleda-Curuś; Katarzyna Woźniak; Luiza Złotkowska; Natalia Czerwonka	3:04.19	
