= Ko Byung-wook =

South Korean footballer (born 1992)

Personal information
- Full name: Ko Byung-wook
- Date of birth: 21 August 1992 (age 34)
- Place of birth: South Korea
- Height: 1.75 m (5 ft 9 in)
- Position: Forward

Team information
- Current team: Jeonnam Dragons
- Number: 22

Senior career*
Years	Team	Apps	(Gls)
2012–2013	Incheon Korail	23	(6)
2014	Gangneung City	23	(16)
2015–	Jeonnam Dragons	4	(0)
- * Club domestic league appearances and goals as of 12 December 2015

- Ko Byung-wook
- Hangul: 고병욱
- Hanja: 高竝旭
- RR: Go Byeonguk
- MR: Ko Pyŏnguk

Ko Byung-wook (Korean: 고병욱; Hanja: 高竝旭; born 21 August 1992) is a South Korean football forward who plays for Jeonnam Dragons in K League Classic.

== Club career ==
Ko joined Incheon Korail in 2012 and made his league debut against Changwon FC on 20 July 2012.and he played 23 league games and scored 6 goals in Incheon Korail. he also won 2012 Korea National League.

In 2014, he signed with Gangneung City and played 26 league games and scored 16 goals.

In 2015, he transferred to Jeonnam Dragons.

== Club career statistics ==
Club performance			League		Cup		continental		Total	
Season	Club	League	Apps	Goals	Apps	Goals	Apps	Goals	Apps	Goals
South Korea			League		KFA Cup		Asia		Total	
2012	Incheon Korail	National League	12	4	0	0	—		12	4
2013	Incheon Korail	National League	11	2	0	0	—		11	2
2014	Gangneung City	National League	23	16	2	1	—		25	17
2015	Jeonnam Dragons	KL Classic	4	0	0	0	—		4	0
Total	South Korea		50	22	2	1	0	0	52	23
Career total			50	22	2	1	0	0	52	23
