= Samuel Schwarz (speed skater) =

German speed skater

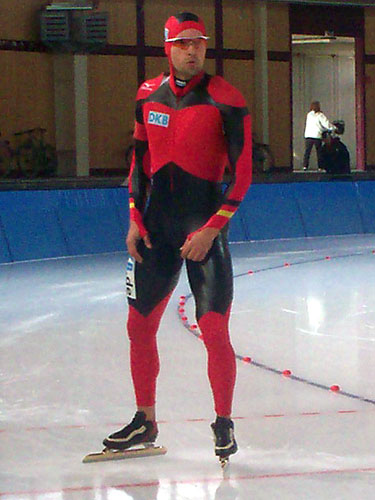
- Schwarz in 2008

Personal information
- Born: 22 August 1983 (age 42) Berlin, Germany
- Height: 1.84 m (6 ft 0 in)
- Weight: 83 kg (183 lb)

Sport
- Country: Germany
- Sport: Speed skating

Samuel Schwarz (born 22 August 1983) is a German speed skater. He finished sixth in the men's 1000 metres event at the 2013 World Single Distance Championships.
