= Pekka Koskela =

Finnish speed skater

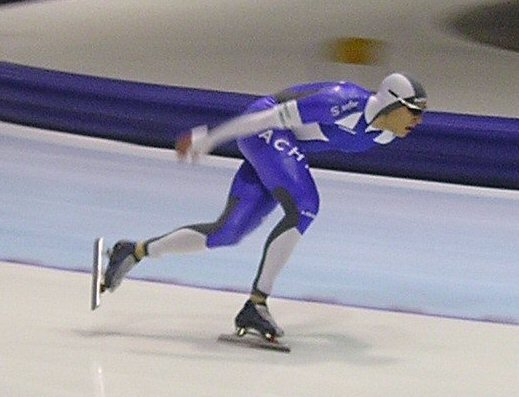

Personal information
- Born: 29 November 1982 (age 43) Mänttä, Finland
- Height: 1.88 m (6 ft 2 in)
- Weight: 88 kg (194 lb)

Sport
- Country: Finland
- Sport: Speed skating
Medal record
Men's speed skating
Representing Finland
World Sprint Championships
Silver medal – second place	2007 Hamar	Sprint
Silver medal – second place	2013 Salt Lake City	Sprint
World Single Distance Championships
Bronze medal – third place	2005 Inzell	1000 m
Bronze medal – third place	2012 Heerenveen	500 m
European Single Distance Championships
Silver medal – second place	2018 Kolomna	Team sprint

Pekka Koskela (born 29 November 1982) is a retired Finnish speed skater, specialised on the sprint distances 500 m and 1000 m. He is the former world record holder on the 1000 m with the time 1:07.00. In December 2001 he set a junior world record on the 500 m with the time 35.89. Since that time he has established himself as one of the best speed skating sprinters in the world. He won his first medal, a bronze, on the 1000 m in the 2005 World Single Distance Championships. Koskela was number 10 in the 500 m of the 2006 Winter Olympics.

Koskela was one of the two dominating skaters at the 2007 World Sprint Championship in Vikingskipet, Hamar. He won both 500 metres, and set a rink record with 34.80, and was leading the proceedings up to the last distance, where he lost the world championship title to Lee Kyou-hyuk. Skating in the last 1000m pair, Koskela needed 1:09.03 to equal Lee, which by coincidence was the exact time Koskela achieved on the first day of the championships. Koskela was 0.14 seconds too late to become world champion, however.

Koskela has won four medals in World Championships. As of August 2013, he has won the 500 m 11 times and the 1000 m 3 times in the Speed Skating World Cup. He has been at the podium of World Cup competition 29 times altogether (500 and 1000 m) and he has been in the top ten 70 times at World Cup competitions. He has also two Finnish championship gold medals in track cycling.

Koskela's brother Pasi Koskela was also world cup-level speed skater, and he is now head coach of the Finnish national speed skating team.

== Records ==
=== Personal records ===
Personal records
Men's speed skating
Event	Result	Date	Location	Notes
500 m	34.36	2013	Salt Lake City, Utah	
1000 m	1:07.00	2007	Salt Lake City, Utah	
1500 m	1:51.52	2002	Calgary	
3000 m	4:10.39	2002	Collalbo	
5000 m	7:35.09	2000	Helsinki	
10000 m	16:30.16	1999	Seinäjoki	

=== World record ===
Event	Time	Date	Venue
1000 m	1:07.00	10 November 2007	Salt Lake City

Source: SpeedSkatingStats.com
