= Jamie Gregg =

Canadian speed skater

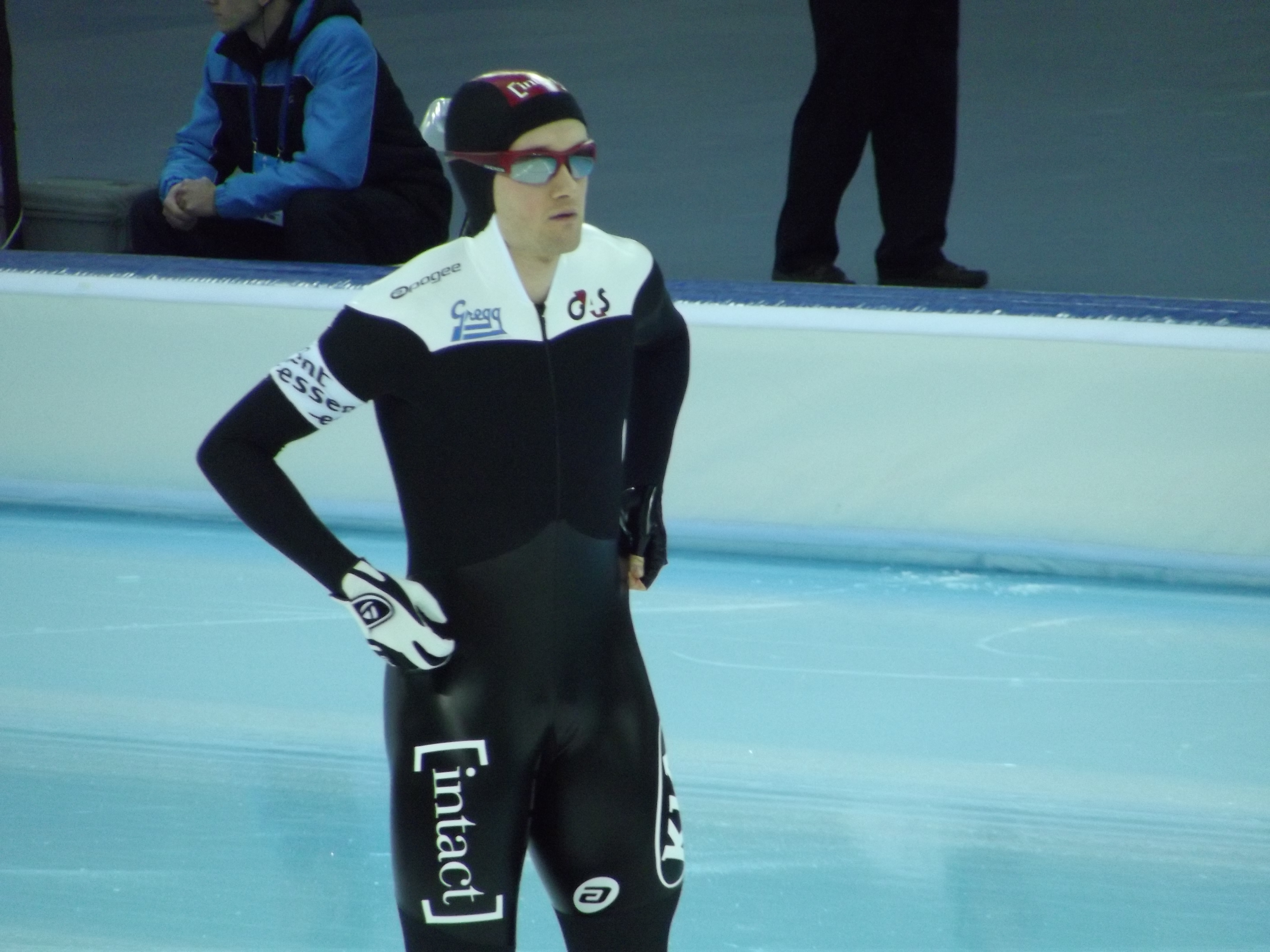
- Gregg in 2013

Personal information
- Born: March 18, 1985 (age 40); Edmonton, Alberta
- Height: 1.80 m (5 ft 11 in)
- Weight: 80 kg (180 lb)

Sport
- Country: Canada
- Sport: Speed skating

Jamie Gregg (born March 18, 1985, in Edmonton, Alberta) is a Canadian long track speed skater.

Gregg was ranked 10th in overall World Cup standings for the 2009–10 season. He competed for Canada at the 2010 Winter Olympics in the 500 m. At the Olympics, Gregg competed in the Richmond Olympic Oval where he finished 8th in the 500 m as the top North American skater, one spot ahead of Jeremy Wotherspoon. He also competed at the 2014 Winter Olympics in Sochi, Russia.

Gregg's younger sister Jessica Gregg also competed at the 2010 Olympics although she competed in short track speed skating.

== Personal life ==
Gregg's father is five times Stanley Cup champion and Canadian former Olympian ice hockey player Randy Gregg. His mother Kathy Vogt participated in long track speed skating for Canada at the 1976 and 1980 Winter Olympics. His sister Sarah Gregg is a former international speed skater and Jessica Gregg is a national team short track speed skater and he is married to Canadian speed skater Danielle Wotherspoon-Gregg. Gregg graduated from medical school at the University of Alberta in 2019.
