= Joji Kato =

Japanese speed skater (born 1985)

Joji Kato (加藤条治)
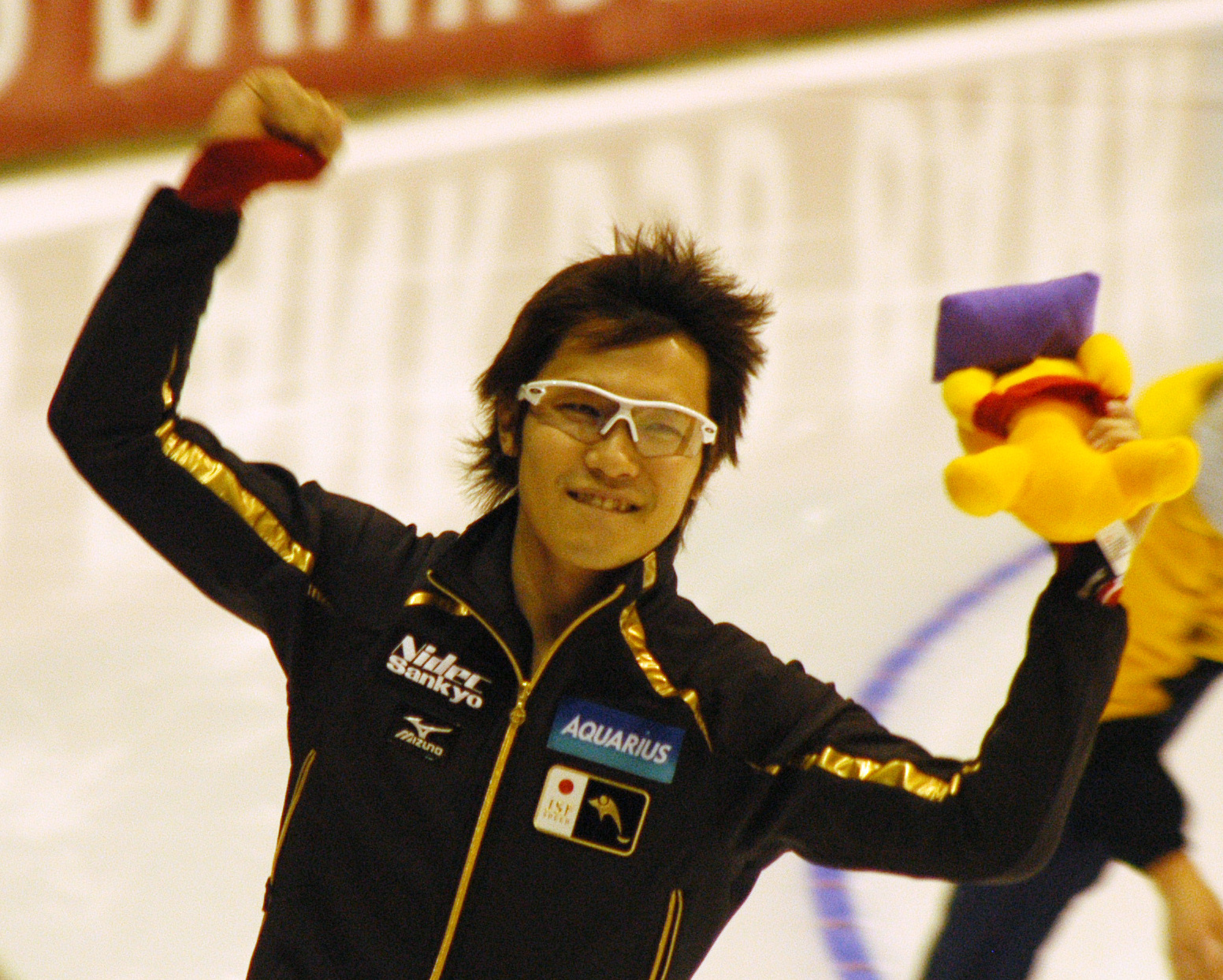
- Kato at a 2008 World Cup in Thialf (Heerenveen, Netherlands)

Personal information
- Born: 6 February 1985 (age 41) Yamagata, Yamagata
- Height: 1.65 m (5 ft 5 in)
- Weight: 61 kg (134 lb; 9.6 st)

Sport
- Country: Japan
- Sport: Speed skating
Medal record
Men's speed skating
Representing Japan
Olympic Games
Bronze medal – third place	2010 Vancouver	500 m
World Championships
Gold medal – first place	2005 Inzell	500 m
Silver medal – second place	2011 Inzell	500 m
Silver medal – second place	2013 Sochi	500 m
Bronze medal – third place	2008 Nagano	500 m
Asian Games
Gold medal – first place	2011 Astana/Almaty	500 m
Bronze medal – third place	2003 Aomori	500 m

Joji Kato (加藤条治, Katō Jōji) (born 6 February 1985) is a Japanese speedskater whose specialty is in the sprinting distance event of 500 metres. At the age of 17 he became the first junior speedskater to skate the 500 metres in less than 35 seconds.

Until 9 March 2007 he was the world record holder with the 34.30 he skated in Salt Lake City on 19 November 2005. He lost the world record to Lee Kang-seok, who skated 34.25 in Salt Lake City.

At the age of 20, he became the 500 metres world champion at the 2005 World Single Distance Championships, leaving behind Hiroyasu Shimizu and Jeremy Wotherspoon. After this achievement he was considered to be one of the favourites for achieving a medal at the 2006 Winter Olympics in Turin. Prior to that 500 metre race, he named three skaters as his toughest competition: Jeremy Wotherspoon of Canada, Joey Cheek of the United States, and Dmitry Dorofeyev of Russia. Cheek and Dorofeyev won gold and silver, respectively, while Kato finished in sixth place. He was also beaten by his own countryman, Yūya Oikawa, who was fourth.

He represented Japan at the 2010 Winter Olympics in Vancouver where he won bronze at men's 500 metres.

At the 2014 Olympics in Sochi, Russia, he again represented Japan and finished 5th in the 500 m with a combined time over two runs of 69.74 and a fastest single time of 34.77 behind the Mulder brothers (Michel and Ronald), Jan Smeekens and Mo Tae-bum.

He is a member of the Nidec Sankyo speed skating team.

== World record ==
Event	Time	Date	Venue
500 m	34.30	19 November 2005	Salt Lake City

Source: SpeedSkatingStats.com

Olympic Games
Preceded by Eriko Sanmiya	Flagbearer for Japan; 2006 Torino	Succeeded by Tomomi Okazaki
