= 2012–13 ISU Speed Skating World Cup =

ISU Speed Skating World Cup
- Dates: 16 November 2012 – 10 March 2013

The 2012–13 ISU Speed Skating World Cup, officially the Essent ISU World Cup Speed Skating 2012–2013, was a series of international speed skating competitions which ran the entire season. The season started on 16 November 2012 in Heerenveen, Netherlands, and ended with the final on 10 March 2013, also in Heerenveen. In total, nine competition weekends were held at eight different locations, twelve cups were contested (six for men, and six for women), and 82 races took place.

This season world cup points was awarded in the mass start event. Additionally, the team sprint was contested as a demonstration event at both Heerenveen competitions. The World Cup is organized by the International Skating Union (ISU).

== Calendar ==
WC #	City	Venue	Date	500 m	1000 m	1500 m	3000 m	5000 m	10000 m	Mass start	Team pursuit
1	(Netherlands) Heerenveen	Thialf	16–18 November	2m, 2w	m, w	m, w	w	m		m, w	m, w
2	(Russia) Kolomna	Speed Skating Centre	24–25 November			m, w	w	m		m, w	
3	(Kazakhstan) Astana	Alau Ice Palace	1–2 December			m, w		w	m		m, w
4	(Japan) Nagano	M-Wave	8–9 December	2m, 2w	2m, 2w						
5	(China) Harbin	Heilongjiang Indoor Rink	15–16 December	2m, 2w	2m, 2w						
	(Netherlands) Heerenveen	Thialf	11–13 January	2013 European Speed Skating Championships							
6	(Canada) Calgary	Olympic Oval	19–20 January	2m, 2w	2m, 2w						
	(United States) Salt Lake City	Utah Olympic Oval	26–27 January	2013 World Sprint Speed Skating Championships							
7	(Germany) Inzell	Eisstadion Inzell	9–10 February			m, w	w	m		m, w	
	(Norway) Hamar	Vikingskipet	16–17 February	2013 World Allround Speed Skating Championships							
8	(Germany) Erfurt	Gunda Niemann-Stirnemann Halle	1–3 March	2m, 2w	m, w	m, w		w	m		m, w
9	(Netherlands) Heerenveen	Thialf	8–10 March	2m, 2w	m, w	m, w	w	m		m, w	m, w
Total				12m, 12w	9m, 9w	6m, 6w	4w	4m, 2w	2m	4m, 4w	4m, 4w

Note: the men's 5000 and 10000 metres were contested as one cup, and the women's 3000 and 5000 metres were contested as one cup, as indicated by the color coding.

Source: ISU

== World records ==
World records going into the 2012–13 season.

=== Men ===
Distance	Time	Nat.	Holder	Date	Venue	Reference
500 m	34.03	(Canada)	Jeremy Wotherspoon	9 November 2007	Utah Olympic Oval, Salt Lake City	
1000 m	1:06.42	(United States)	Shani Davis	7 March 2009	Utah Olympic Oval, Salt Lake City	
1500 m	1:41.04	(United States)	Shani Davis	11 December 2009	Utah Olympic Oval, Salt Lake City	
5000 m	6:03.32	(Netherlands)	Sven Kramer	17 November 2007	Olympic Oval, Calgary	
10000 m	12:41.69	(Netherlands)	Sven Kramer	10 March 2007	Utah Olympic Oval, Salt Lake City	
Team pursuit (8 laps)	3:37.80	(Netherlands)	Sven Kramer; Carl Verheijen; Erben Wennemars	11 March 2007	Utah Olympic Oval, Salt Lake City	

=== Women ===
Distance	Time	Nat.	Holder	Date	Venue	Reference
500 m	36.94	(China)	Yu Jing	29 January 2012	Olympic Oval, Calgary	
1000 m	1:12.68	(Canada)	Christine Nesbitt	28 January 2012	Olympic Oval, Calgary	
1500 m	1:51.79	(Canada)	Cindy Klassen	20 November 2005	Utah Olympic Oval, Salt Lake City	
3000 m	3:53.34	(Canada)	Cindy Klassen	18 March 2006	Olympic Oval, Calgary	
5000 m	6:42.66	(Czech Republic)	Martina Sáblíková	18 February 2011	Utah Olympic Oval, Salt Lake City	
Team pursuit (6 laps)	2:55.79	(Canada)	Kristina Groves; Christine Nesbitt; Brittany Schussler	6 December 2009	Olympic Oval, Calgary	

At the World Cup stop in Calgary on 20 January 2013, Lee Sang-hwa of South Korea set a new world record on the women's 500 metres with a time of 36.80 seconds.

== Men's standings ==
=== 500 m ===
Rank	Name	Points
1	(Netherlands) Jan Smeekens	1130
2	(Japan) Joji Kato	896
3	(Netherlands) Michel Mulder	665

=== 1000 m ===
Rank	Name	Points
1	(Netherlands) Kjeld Nuis	587
2	(United States) Shani Davis	546
3	(Netherlands) Hein Otterspeer	507

=== 1500 m ===
Rank	Name	Points
1	(Poland) Zbigniew Bródka	460
2	(Belgium) Bart Swings	336
3	(Norway) Håvard Bøkko	329

=== 5000 and 10000 m ===
Rank	Name	Points
1	(Netherlands) Jorrit Bergsma	520
2	(Netherlands) Bob de Jong	485
3	(Netherlands) Sven Kramer	450

=== Mass start ===
Rank	Name	Points
1	(Netherlands) Arjan Stroetinga	330
2	(Belgium) Bart Swings	310
3	(Canada) Jordan Belchos	216

=== Team pursuit ===
Rank	Team	Points
1	Netherlands	450
2	South Korea	350
3	Russia	285

== Women's standings ==
=== 500 m ===
Rank	Name	Points
1	(South Korea) Lee Sang-hwa	1055
2	(Germany) Jenny Wolf	851
3	(China) Wang Beixing	756

=== 1000 m ===
Rank	Name	Points
1	(United States) Heather Richardson	525
2	(United States) Brittany Bowe	480
3	(Czech Republic) Karolína Erbanová	465

=== 1500 m ===
Rank	Name	Points
1	(Netherlands) Marrit Leenstra	411
2	(Canada) Christine Nesbitt	375
3	(Netherlands) Ireen Wüst	350

=== 3000 and 5000 m ===
Rank	Name	Points
1	(Czech Republic) Martina Sáblíková	475
2	(Germany) Claudia Pechstein	421
3	(Netherlands) Diane Valkenburg	410

=== Mass start ===
Rank	Name	Points
1	(South Korea) Kim Bo-reum	365
2	(Netherlands) Mariska Huisman	330
3	(Canada) Ivanie Blondin	300

=== Team pursuit ===
Rank	Team	Points
1	Netherlands	400
2	Canada	370
3	Poland	295

== Medal table ==
Rank	Nation	Gold	Silver	Bronze	Total
1	Netherlands	35	27	36	98
2	South Korea	11	5	7	23
3	United States	9	7	8	24
4	Canada	6	9	4	19
5	Germany	5	5	7	17
6	China	3	6	2	11
7	Japan	3	5	4	12
8	Czech Republic	3	3	1	7
9	Finland	3	2	0	5
10	Belgium	2	1	0	3
11	Russia	1	3	6	10
12	Poland	1	3	4	8
13	Norway	0	2	2	4
14	Latvia	0	2	0	2
15	France	0	1	2	3
16	Italy	0	1	0	1
Totals (16 entries)		82	82	83	247
