= 2011–12 ISU Speed Skating World Cup – Women's 500 metres =

The 500 metres distance for women in the 2011–12 ISU Speed Skating World Cup was contested over 12 races on six occasions, out of a total of seven World Cup occasions for the season, with the first occasion taking place in Chelyabinsk, Russia, on 18–20 November 2011, and the final occasion taking place in Berlin, Germany, on 9–11 March 2012.

Yu Jing of China won the cup, while Lee Sang-hwa of South Korea came second, and the defending champion, Jenny Wolf of Germany, came third.

== Top three ==
Medal	Athlete	Points	Previous season
Gold	(China) Yu Jing	960	12th
Silver	(South Korea) Lee Sang-hwa	890	2nd
Bronze	(Germany) Jenny Wolf	869	1st

== Race medallists ==
Occasion #	Location	Date	Gold	Time	Silver	Time	Bronze	Time	Report
1	Chelyabinsk, Russia	18 November	Yu Jing; China	37.81	Maki Tsuji; Japan; Thijsje Oenema; Netherlands	38.22			
1	Chelyabinsk, Russia	19 November	Yu Jing; China	37.65	Lee Sang-hwa; South Korea	38.09	Jenny Wolf; Germany	38.22	
2	Astana, Kazakhstan	25 November	Lee Sang-hwa; South Korea	37.78	Jenny Wolf; Germany	38.04	Thijsje Oenema; Netherlands	38.22	
2	Astana, Kazakhstan	26 November	Jenny Wolf; Germany	37.984	Lee Sang-hwa; South Korea	37.985	Nao Kodaira; Japan	37.99	
3	Heerenveen, Netherlands	2 December	Yu Jing; China	37.84	Lee Sang-hwa; South Korea	37.91	Wang Beixing; China	38.17	
3	Heerenveen, Netherlands	3 December	Yu Jing; China	37.67	Jenny Wolf; Germany	38.19	Laurine van Riessen; Netherlands	38.20	
4	Salt Lake City, United States	21 January	Lee Sang-hwa; South Korea	37.36	Nao Kodaira; Japan	37.42	Heather Richardson; United States	37.58	
4	Salt Lake City, United States	22 January	Lee Sang-hwa; South Korea	37.27	Yu Jing; China	37.51	Jenny Wolf; Germany	37.62	
6	Heerenveen, Netherlands	2 March	Yu Jing; China	38.03	Margot Boer; Netherlands	38.30	Heather Richardson; United States	38.51	
6	Heerenveen, Netherlands	3 March	Jenny Wolf; Germany	37.93	Yu Jing; China	38.01	Heather Richardson; United States	38.28	
7	Berlin, Germany	9 March	Yu Jing; China	37.94	Lee Sang-hwa; South Korea	38.00	Jenny Wolf; Germany	38.37	
7	Berlin, Germany	10 March	Yu Jing; China	37.63	Lee Sang-hwa; South Korea	37.66	Christine Nesbitt; Canada	38.17	

== Standings ==
Standings as of 11 March 2012 (end of the season).

#	Name	Nat.	CHE1	CHE2	AST1	AST2	HVN1	HVN2	SLC1	SLC2	HVN3	HVN4	BER1	BER2	Total
1	Yu Jing	(China)	100	100	–	–	100	100	0	80	100	80	150	150	960
2	Lee Sang-hwa	(South Korea)	50	80	100	80	80	60	100	100	–	–	120	120	890
3	Jenny Wolf	(Germany)	40	70	80	100	50	80	24	70	60	100	105	90	869
4	Margot Boer	(Netherlands)	45	50	45	60	18	18	40	36	80	60	75	28	555
5	Thijsje Oenema	(Netherlands)	80	60	70	40	36	24	32	50	36	16	45	45	534
6	Nao Kodaira	(Japan)	24	36	60	70	60	–	80	45	50	32	32	18	507
7	Wang Beixing	(China)	36	32	–	–	70	32	50	60	45	45	40	75	485
8	Maki Tsuji	(Japan)	80	40	50	50	45	28	21	14	40	50	24	32	474
9	Heather Richardson	(United States)	18	18	21	24	24	40	70	32	70	70	28	36	451
10	Christine Nesbitt	(Canada)	5	14	24	36	28	50	60	–	–	–	90	105	412
11	Annette Gerritsen	(Netherlands)	60	28	28	32	32	16	28	28	28	14	8	16	318
12	Laurine van Riessen	(Netherlands)	16	21	40	21	21	70	18	24	32	24	10	6	303
13	Miyako Sumiyoshi	(Japan)	12	5	18	16	14	14	45	40	14	40	12	21	251
14	Zhang Hong	(China)	32	45	–	–	40	21	6	18	–	–	36	40	238
15	Jin Peiyu	(China)	21	24	–	–	25	36	36	16	21	–	21	24	224
16	Judith Hesse	(Germany)	28	16	36	45	–	–	14	21	24	12	5	8	209
17	Karolína Erbanová	(Czech Republic)	11	25	32	28	16	45	–	–	–	–	18	5	180
18	Anastasia Bucsis	(Canada)	8	8	8	8	1	11	19	25	12	21	14	12	147
19	Olga Fatkulina	(Russia)	19	19	5	4	11	15	16	10	6	10	16	14	145
20	Brittany Bowe	(United States)	4	2	19	25	10	10	12	12	18	8	4	4	128
21	Yekaterina Aydova	(Kazakhstan)	0	2	2	15	6	25	8	5	25	36	–	1	125
22	Jennifer Plate	(Germany)	15	15	16	18	8	0	–	–	19	15	6	10	122
23	Yukana Nishina	(Japan)	10	12	10	5	15	19	10	6	8	6	2	2	105
24	Monique Angermüller	(Germany)	14	10	12	10	19	–	15	15	–	–	–	–	95
25	Svetlana Radkevich	(Belarus)	1	6	25	6	5	12	0	4	8	19	–	–	86
26	Yekaterina Malysheva	(Russia)	25	6	14	14	12	8	–	–	–	–	–	–	79
27	Mayon Kuipers	(Netherlands)	–	–	–	–	–	–	11	19	10	28	–	–	68
28	Qi Shuai	(China)	–	–	–	–	–	–	25	8	16	18	–	–	67
29	Shannon Rempel	(Canada)	8	8	15	8	6	6	–	11	0	1	–	–	63
30	Svetlana Kaykan	(Russia)	6	4	–	–	8	11	6	0	15	11	–	–	61
31	Danielle Wotherspoon	(Canada)	–	–	–	–	–	–	4	8	11	25	3	3	54
32	Lauren Cholewinski	(United States)	1	0	1	19	4	1	8	2	4	8	–	–	48
33	Kim Hyun-yung	(South Korea)	6	11	6	12	0	2	–	–	–	–	–	–	37
34	Anice Das	(Netherlands)	3	3	8	11	–	–	–	–	–	–	–	–	25
35	Yuliya Liteykina	(Russia)	2	4	11	4	–	–	–	–	–	–	–	–	21
36	Lee Bo-ra	(South Korea)	2	1	6	6	2	4	–	–	–	–	–	–	21
37	Heike Hartmann	(Germany)	–	–	–	–	0	0	2	6	6	6	–	–	20
38	Erina Kamiya	(Japan)	4	1	4	2	0	0	–	–	–	–	–	–	11
39	Janine Smit	(Netherlands)	–	–	–	–	0	6	–	–	–	–	–	–	6
40	Yvonne Daldossi	(Italy)	–	–	–	–	–	–	–	–	0	4	–	–	4
41	Irina Arshinova	(Russia)	–	–	–	–	–	–	–	–	2	2	–	–	4
42	Kelly Gunther	(United States)	0	0	0	1	0	0	0	1	1	0	–	–	3
43	Miho Takagi	(Japan)	–	–	–	–	–	–	1	1	–	–	–	–	2
