= 2011–12 ISU Speed Skating World Cup – Women's 1000 metres =

The 1000 metres distance for women in the 2011–12 ISU Speed Skating World Cup was contested over seven races on six occasions, out of a total of seven World Cup occasions for the season, with the first occasion taking place in Chelyabinsk, Russia, on 18–20 November 2011, and the final occasion taking place in Berlin, Germany, on 9–11 March 2012.

Christine Nesbitt of Canada won the cup, while the defending champion, Heather Richardson of the United States, came second, and Marrit Leenstra of the Netherlands came third.

== Top three ==
Medal	Athlete	Points	Previous season
Gold	(Canada) Christine Nesbitt	550	2nd
Silver	(United States) Heather Richardson	459	1st
Bronze	(Netherlands) Marrit Leenstra	420	9th

== Race medallists ==
Occasion #	Location	Date	Gold	Time	Silver	Time	Bronze	Time	Report
1	Chelyabinsk, Russia	20 November	Christine Nesbitt; Canada	1:15.97	Margot Boer; Netherlands	1:16.52	Marrit Leenstra; Netherlands	1:16.77	
2	Astana, Kazakhstan	27 November	Christine Nesbitt; Canada	1:14.82	Thijsje Oenema; Netherlands	1:16.120	Margot Boer; Netherlands	1:16.127	
3	Heerenveen, Netherlands	4 December	Christine Nesbitt; Canada	1:15.32	Yu Jing; China	1:15.85	Yekaterina Shikhova; Russia	1:16.16	
4	Salt Lake City, United States	21 January	Christine Nesbitt; Canada	1:13.36	Heather Richardson; United States	1:13.99	Ireen Wüst; Netherlands	1:14.51	
4	Salt Lake City, United States	22 January	Laurine van Riessen; Netherlands	1:14.21	Marrit Leenstra; Netherlands	1:14.41	Monique Angermüller; Germany	1:14.83	
6	Heerenveen, Netherlands	4 March	Heather Richardson; United States	1:15.82	Ireen Wüst; Netherlands	1:16.48	Marrit Leenstra; Netherlands	1:16.54	
7	Berlin, Germany	11 March	Christine Nesbitt; Canada	1:15.04	Heather Richardson; United States	1:15.77	Zhang Hong; China	1:15.83	

== Standings ==
Standings as of 11 March 2012 (end of the season).

#	Name	Nat.	CHE	AST	HVN	SLC1	SLC2	HVN2	BER	Total
1	Christine Nesbitt	(Canada)	100	100	100	100	–	–	150	550
2	Heather Richardson	(United States)	40	24	45	80	50	100	120	459
3	Marrit Leenstra	(Netherlands)	70	60	50	45	80	70	45	420
4	Margot Boer	(Netherlands)	80	70	16	28	36	60	75	365
5	Ireen Wüst	(Netherlands)	24	50	40	70	50	80	–	314
6	Laurine van Riessen	(Netherlands)	60	40	28	16	100	16	40	300
7	Yekaterina Shikhova	(Russia)	45	28	70	8	24	32	12	219
8	Zhang Hong	(China)	25	–	21	60	–	–	105	211
9	Yu Jing	(China)	36	–	80	–	–	–	90	206
10	Brittany Bowe	(United States)	12	21	14	50	10	50	24	181
11	Monique Angermüller	(Germany)	2	25	36	36	70	–	–	169
12	Annette Gerritsen	(Netherlands)	–	–	–	25	60	36	32	153
13	Thijsje Oenema	(Netherlands)	18	80	18	–	–	–	36	152
14	Nao Kodaira	(Japan)	6	19	32	24	0	40	21	142
15	Maki Tsuji	(Japan)	32	32	8	18	16	28	6	140
16	Yekaterina Lobysheva	(Russia)	21	8	10	40	32	14	8	133
17	Yuliya Skokova	(Russia)	15	18	24	6	21	24	18	126
18	Karolína Erbanová	(Czech Republic)	19	45	60	–	–	–	–	124
19	Olga Fatkulina	(Russia)	6	0	19	12	40	21	10	108
20	Yekaterina Aydova	(Kazakhstan)	–	5	15	10	12	45	16	103
21	Judith Hesse	(Germany)	14	36	–	14	28	8	–	100
22	Lee Sang-hwa	(South Korea)	50	16	12	21	0	–	–	99
23	Miho Takagi	(Japan)	16	14	6	19	15	–	28	98
24	Jin Peiyu	(China)	–	–	25	32	14	–	5	76
25	Gabriele Hirschbichler	(Germany)	10	12	0	2	25	10	–	59
26	Kali Christ	(Canada)	–	–	–	11	0	25	14	50
27	Ida Njåtun	(Norway)	5	15	5	–	–	18	–	43
28	Kaylin Irvine	(Canada)	–	–	–	4	11	19	–	34
29	Yekaterina Malysheva	(Russia)	32	–	–	–	–	–	–	32
30	Miyako Sumiyoshi	(Japan)	11	10	11	–	–	–	–	32
31	Cindy Klassen	(Canada)	3	11	4	–	–	12	–	30
32	Heike Hartmann	(Germany)	–	–	0	15	6	6	–	27
33	Anastasia Bucsis	(Canada)	4	6	8	6	1	–	–	25
34	Qi Shuai	(China)	–	–	–	–	19	5	–	24
35	Brittany Schussler	(Canada)	–	–	–	5	18	–	–	23
36	Hege Bøkko	(Norway)	0	2	6	–	–	15	–	23
37	Shannon Rempel	(Canada)	8	6	0	–	8	–	–	22
38	Yukana Nishina	(Japan)	–	–	–	8	0	8	–	16
39	Claudia Pechstein	(Germany)	8	8	–	–	–	–	–	16
40	Kelly Gunther	(United States)	2	0	0	1	4	6	–	13
41	Svetlana Radkevich	(Belarus)	0	4	2	0	2	4	–	12
42	Yevgenia Dmitrieva	(Russia)	–	0	–	–	–	11	–	11
43	Wang Beixing	(China)	4	–	–	–	–	–	–	4
44	Denise Roth	(Germany)	–	–	–	–	–	2	–	2
45	Kim Hyun-yung	(South Korea)	0	1	1	–	–	–	–	2
46	Elina Risku	(Finland)	0	0	0	–	–	1	–	1
47	Tamara Oudenaarden	(Canada)	1	0	0	–	–	–	–	1
