= 2011–12 ISU Speed Skating World Cup – Women's 3000 and 5000 metres =

The 3000 and 5000 metres distances for women in the 2011–12 ISU Speed Skating World Cup were contested over six races on six occasions, out of a total of seven World Cup occasions for the season, with the first occasion taking place in Chelyabinsk, Russia, on 18–20 November 2011, and the final occasion taking place in Berlin, Germany, on 9–11 March 2012.

Martina Sáblíková of the Czech Republic successfully defended her title from the previous season by winning all races, while Stephanie Beckert of Germany came second, and Claudia Pechstein, also of Germany, came third.

== Top three ==
Medal	Athlete	Points	Previous season
Gold	(Czech Republic) Martina Sáblíková	650	1st
Silver	(Germany) Stephanie Beckert	410	2nd
Bronze	(Germany) Claudia Pechstein	405	15th

== Race medallists ==
Occasion #	Location	Date	Distance	Gold	Time	Silver	Time	Bronze	Time	Report
1	Chelyabinsk, Russia	18 November	3000 metres	Martina Sáblíková; Czech Republic	4:06.54	Ireen Wüst; Netherlands	4:07.16	Claudia Pechstein; Germany	4:07.81	
2	Astana, Kazakhstan	25 November	3000 metres	Martina Sáblíková; Czech Republic	4:03.28	Claudia Pechstein; Germany	4:03.59	Diane Valkenburg; Netherlands	4:05.36	
3	Heerenveen, Netherlands	2 December	5000 metres	Martina Sáblíková; Czech Republic	6:58.87	Claudia Pechstein; Germany	7:02.92	Stephanie Beckert; Germany	7:04.77	
5	Hamar, Norway	12 February	3000 metres	Martina Sáblíková; Czech Republic	4:05.88	Stephanie Beckert; Germany	4:06.42	Ireen Wüst; Netherlands	4:06.57	
6	Heerenveen, Netherlands	2 March	5000 metres	Martina Sáblíková; Czech Republic	6:52.50	Stephanie Beckert; Germany	6:53.36	Claudia Pechstein; Germany	7:05.37	
7	Berlin, Germany	9 March	3000 metres	Martina Sáblíková; Czech Republic	4:03.14	Stephanie Beckert; Germany	4:05.62	Claudia Pechstein; Germany	4:07.64	

== Standings ==
Standings as of 11 March 2012 (end of the season).

#	Name	Nat.	CHE	AST	HVN1	HAM	HVN2	BER	Total
1	Martina Sáblíková	(Czech Republic)	100	100	100	100	100	150	650
2	Stephanie Beckert	(Germany)	36	24	70	80	80	120	410
3	Claudia Pechstein	(Germany)	70	80	80	–	70	105	405
4	Diane Valkenburg	(Netherlands)	50	70	–	60	40	75	295
5	Linda de Vries	(Netherlands)	60	36	60	–	–	90	246
6	Masako Hozumi	(Japan)	40	40	0	45	60	40	225
7	Cindy Klassen	(Canada)	45	50	45	50	25	10	225
8	Ireen Wüst	(Netherlands)	80	60	–	70	–	–	210
9	Olga Graf	(Russia)	32	18	20	24	50	32	176
10	Yevgenia Dmitrieva	(Russia)	25	45	35	21	20	8	154
11	Eriko Ishino	(Japan)	16	12	25	32	45	21	151
12	Shiho Ishizawa	(Japan)	21	16	50	8	35	16	146
13	Annouk van der Weijden	(Netherlands)	–	–	30	40	35	28	133
14	Jorien Voorhuis	(Netherlands)	–	–	–	36	30	45	111
15	Ida Njåtun	(Norway)	28	32	–	16	15	12	103
16	Jilleanne Rookard	(United States)	8	25	30	10	11	18	102
17	Ayaka Kikuchi	(Japan)	15	8	21	14	21	14	93
18	Marije Joling	(Netherlands)	–	–	–	25	30	36	91
19	Janneke Ensing	(Netherlands)	24	21	40	–	–	–	85
20	Brittany Schussler	(Canada)	18	6	18	18	–	24	84
21	Carlijn Achtereekte	(Netherlands)	12	14	25	–	13	–	64
22	Christine Nesbitt	(Canada)	–	28	–	28	–	–	56
23	Isabell Ost	(Germany)	8	15	–	6	18	5	52
24	Bente Kraus	(Germany)	–	–	8	11	25	6	50
25	Kim Bo-reum	(South Korea)	19	5	7	12	–	–	43
26	Pien Keulstra	(Netherlands)	–	–	35	–	–	–	35
27	Natalia Czerwonka	(Poland)	4	4	–	19	8	–	35
28	Anna Rokita	(Austria)	6	2	10	8	9	–	35
29	Nicole Garrido	(Canada)	10	0	13	5	5	–	33
30	Mari Hemmer	(Norway)	0	0	1	15	15	–	31
31	Yekaterina Shikhova	(Russia)	6	19	–	–	–	–	25
32	Katrin Mattscherodt	(Germany)	–	–	15	0	10	–	25
33	Yekaterina Lobysheva	(Russia)	14	10	–	–	–	–	24
34	Maria Lamb	(United States)	2	1	9	0	6	–	18
35	Yuliya Skokova	(Russia)	11	6	–	–	–	–	17
36	Hege Bøkko	(Norway)	3	8	–	6	–	–	17
37	Noh Seon-yeong	(South Korea)	4	11	–	1	–	–	16
38	Fuyo Matsuoka	(Japan)	5	0	11	–	–	–	16
39	Luiza Złotkowska	(Poland)	–	–	5	0	7	–	12
40	Ivanie Blondin	(Canada)	1	0	6	–	–	–	7
41	Lee Ju-yeon	(South Korea)	1	0	–	4	–	–	5
42	Victoria Spence	(Canada)	–	–	2	–	3	–	5
43	Jelena Peeters	(Belgium)	–	–	–	–	4	–	4
44	Lada Zadonskaya	(Russia)	–	–	4	0	–	–	4
45	Anastasiya Vorontsova	(Russia)	–	–	3	0	–	–	3
46	Shoko Fujimura	(Japan)	–	–	–	2	–	–	2
46	Katarzyna Woźniak	(Poland)	2	0	–	0	–	–	2
