= 2011–12 ISU Speed Skating World Cup – Men's 1000 metres =

The 1000 metres distance for men in the 2011–12 ISU Speed Skating World Cup was contested over seven races on six occasions, out of a total of seven World Cup occasions for the season, with the first occasion taking place in Chelyabinsk, Russia, on 18–20 November 2011, and the final occasion taking place in Berlin, Germany, on 9–11 March 2012.

Shani Davis of the United States won the cup, while the defending champion, Stefan Groothuis of the Netherlands, came second, and Kjeld Nuis, also of the Netherlands, came third.

== Top three ==
Medal	Athlete	Points	Previous season
Gold	(United States) Shani Davis	600	3rd
Silver	(Netherlands) Stefan Groothuis	580	1st
Bronze	(Netherlands) Kjeld Nuis	486	19th

== Race medallists ==
Occasion #	Location	Date	Gold	Time	Silver	Time	Bronze	Time	Report
1	Chelyabinsk, Russia	20 November	Stefan Groothuis; Netherlands	1:08.49	Kjeld Nuis; Netherlands	1:08.56	Denny Morrison; Canada	1:09.26	
2	Astana, Kazakhstan	27 November	Stefan Groothuis; Netherlands	1:08.85	Kjeld Nuis; Netherlands	1:08.92	Mo Tae-bum; South Korea	1:09.29	
3	Heerenveen, Netherlands	4 December	Kjeld Nuis; Netherlands	1:08.64	Sjoerd de Vries; Netherlands	1:09.14	Mo Tae-bum; South Korea	1:09.18	
4	Salt Lake City, United States	21 January	Shani Davis; United States	1:07.20	Denny Morrison; Canada	1:07.39	Stefan Groothuis; Netherlands	1:07.45	
4	Salt Lake City, United States	22 January	Shani Davis; United States	1:07.69	Stefan Groothuis; Netherlands	1:07.94	Pekka Koskela; Finland	1:08.17	
6	Heerenveen, Netherlands	4 March	Shani Davis; United States	1:08.88	Stefan Groothuis; Netherlands	1:09.00	Kjeld Nuis; Netherlands	1:09.05	
7	Berlin, Germany	11 March	Shani Davis; United States	1:09.24	Kjeld Nuis; Netherlands	1:09.36	Mo Tae-bum; South Korea	1:09.37	

== Standings ==
Standings as of 11 March 2012 (end of the season).

#	Name	Nat.	CHE	AST	HVN1	SLC1	SLC2	HVN2	BER	Total
1	Shani Davis	(United States)	50	60	40	100	100	100	150	600
2	Stefan Groothuis	(Netherlands)	100	100	60	70	80	80	90	580
3	Kjeld Nuis	(Netherlands)	80	80	100	0	36	70	120	486
4	Denny Morrison	(Canada)	70	50	45	80	60	14	75	394
5	Sjoerd de Vries	(Netherlands)	60	40	80	60	45	50	24	359
6	Mo Tae-bum	(South Korea)	25	70	70	36	0	–	105	306
7	Samuel Schwarz	(Germany)	45	45	36	32	40	21	21	240
8	Jamie Gregg	(Canada)	21	14	50	50	–	28	45	208
9	Pekka Koskela	(Finland)	15	24	8	45	70	36	3	201
10	Aleksey Yesin	(Russia)	14	21	24	24	32	45	36	196
11	Michel Mulder	(Netherlands)	12	8	–	2	15	60	32	129
12	Brian Hansen	(United States)	32	36	–	–	–	32	28	128
13	Yevgeny Lalenkov	(Russia)	28	10	16	21	16	18	16	125
14	Dmitry Lobkov	(Russia)	3	8	15	40	50	–	8	124
15	Benjamin Macé	(France)	0	25	18	28	18	8	18	115
16	Hein Otterspeer	(Netherlands)	–	–	–	0	25	40	40	105
17	Pim Schipper	(Netherlands)	40	32	28	–	–	–	–	100
18	Mikael Flygind Larsen	(Norway)	16	28	21	10	–	12	10	97
19	Håvard Holmefjord Lorentzen	(Norway)	11	18	32	16	14	–	4	95
20	Denis Kuzin	(Kazakhstan)	24	16	6	12	12	16	6	92
21	Roman Krech	(Kazakhstan)	1	6	19	18	24	6	12	86
22	Mika Poutala	(Finland)	8	0	11	19	19	24	5	86
23	Mirko Giacomo Nenzi	(Italy)	18	6	14	14	21	10	0	83
24	Lee Kyou-hyuk	(South Korea)	36	12	12	0	–	–	–	60
25	Haralds Silovs	(Latvia)	–	0	0	25	28	–	–	53
26	Wang Nan	(China)	19	–	4	8	10	5	–	46
27	Håvard Bøkko	(Norway)	6	–	–	–	–	25	14	45
28	Lucas Makowsky	(Canada)	5	15	–	0	11	–	–	31
29	Daniel Greig	(Australia)	–	–	–	0	15	11	–	26
30	Aleksandr Lebedev	(Russia)	10	0	2	6	8	0	–	26
31	Mark Tuitert	(Netherlands)	–	–	25	–	–	–	–	25
32	Konrad Niedźwiedzki	(Poland)	2	0	–	–	–	19	–	21
33	Christoffer Fagerli Rukke	(Norway)	0	19	0	0	–	–	–	19
34	Artyom Kuznetsov	(Russia)	–	–	–	11	–	8	–	19
35	Muncef Ouardi	(Italy)	–	–	–	–	2	15	–	17
36	Gilmore Junio	(Canada)	4	11	1	–	–	–	–	16
37	Philippe Riopel	(Canada)	–	–	10	1	1	4	–	16
38	Kyle Parrott	(Canada)	1	0	8	0	6	1	–	16
39	Keiichiro Nagashima	(Japan)	–	4	–	8	0	2	–	14
40	Lee Kang-seok	(South Korea)	8	0	6	–	–	–	–	14
41	Ermanno Ioriatti	(Italy)	–	–	0	–	–	6	–	6
42	Yuji Kamijo	(Japan)	6	0	0	–	–	–	–	6
43	Espen-Aarnes Hvammen	(Norway)	0	2	0	0	4	–	–	6
44	Mitchell Whitmore	(United States)	4	1	0	0	0	0	–	5
45	Tucker Fredricks	(United States)	–	–	–	4	0	–	–	4
46	Matteo Anesi	(Italy)	2	0	–	0	0	–	–	2
