= 2011–12 ISU Speed Skating World Cup – Women's 1500 metres =

The 1500 metres distance for women in the 2011–12 ISU Speed Skating World Cup was contested over six races on six occasions, out of a total of seven World Cup occasions for the season, with the first occasion taking place in Chelyabinsk, Russia, on 18–20 November 2011, and the final occasion taking place in Berlin, Germany, on 9–11 March 2012.

Christine Nesbitt of Canada successfully defended her title from the previous season, while Ireen Wüst of the Netherlands came second, and Marrit Leenstra, also of the Netherlands, came third.

== Top three ==
Medal	Athlete	Points	Previous season
Gold	(Canada) Christine Nesbitt	510	1st
Silver	(Netherlands) Ireen Wüst	450	3rd
Bronze	(Netherlands) Marrit Leenstra	401	2nd

== Race medallists ==
Occasion #	Location	Date	Gold	Time	Silver	Time	Bronze	Time	Report
1	Chelyabinsk, Russia	19 November	Ireen Wüst; Netherlands	1:57.02	Christine Nesbitt; Canada	1:57.44	Marrit Leenstra; Netherlands	1:58.27	
2	Astana, Kazakhstan	26 November	Christine Nesbitt; Canada	1:56.10	Claudia Pechstein; Germany	1:56.77	Ireen Wüst; Netherlands	1:57.00	
3	Heerenveen, Netherlands	3 December	Christine Nesbitt; Canada	1:55.68	Ireen Wüst; Netherlands	1:57.15	Yekaterina Shikhova; Russia	1:57.17	
5	Hamar, Norway	11 February	Ireen Wüst; Netherlands	1:56.99	Christine Nesbitt; Canada	1:57.03	Marrit Leenstra; Netherlands	1:57.59	
6	Heerenveen, Netherlands	3 March	Ireen Wüst; Netherlands	1:56.01	Marrit Leenstra; Netherlands	1:57.35	Diane Valkenburg; Netherlands	1:58.05	
7	Berlin, Germany	10 March	Christine Nesbitt; Canada	1:56.77	Marrit Leenstra; Netherlands	1:56.93	Martina Sáblíková; Czech Republic	1:57.36	

== Standings ==
Standings as of 11 March 2012 (end of the season).

#	Name	Nat.	CHE	AST	HVN1	HAM	HVN2	BER	Total
1	Christine Nesbitt	(Canada)	80	100	100	80	–	150	510
2	Ireen Wüst	(Netherlands)	100	70	80	100	100	–	450
3	Marrit Leenstra	(Netherlands)	70	40	21	70	80	120	401
4	Martina Sáblíková	(Czech Republic)	21	60	50	40	–	105	276
5	Diane Valkenburg	(Netherlands)	40	45	24	50	70	36	265
6	Yekaterina Shikhova	(Russia)	60	18	70	14	60	12	234
7	Yuliya Skokova	(Russia)	19	16	60	32	40	18	185
8	Yekaterina Lobysheva	(Russia)	24	32	32	60	18	16	182
9	Ida Njåtun	(Norway)	45	28	16	45	32	14	180
10	Brittany Schussler	(Canada)	14	10	36	6	–	90	156
11	Claudia Pechstein	(Germany)	36	80	18	8	–	–	142
12	Linda de Vries	(Netherlands)	32	36	28	–	–	45	141
13	Miho Takagi	(Japan)	25	14	10	10	–	75	134
14	Cindy Klassen	(Canada)	28	50	6	16	–	32	132
15	Yevgenia Dmitrieva	(Russia)	18	25	45	12	24	8	131
16	Margot Boer	(Netherlands)	16	21	–	36	50	–	123
17	Hege Bøkko	(Norway)	8	25	8	18	36	28	123
18	Natalia Czerwonka	(Poland)	8	4	11	24	28	40	115
19	Monique Angermüller	(Germany)	60	8	40	–	–	–	108
20	Ayaka Kikuchi	(Japan)	6	15	14	21	16	10	82
21	Heather Richardson	(United States)	10	19	5	–	45	–	79
22	Kim Bo-reum	(South Korea)	11	5	8	28	–	21	73
23	Kali Christ	(Canada)	–	–	–	4	25	24	53
24	Nao Kodaira	(Japan)	12	12	12	–	–	–	36
25	Noh Seon-yeong	(South Korea)	4	11	4	15	–	–	34
26	Paulien van Deutekom	(Netherlands)	–	–	–	19	12	–	31
27	Olga Graf	(Russia)	–	–	–	8	21	–	29
28	Isabell Ost	(Germany)	6	6	6	1	10	–	29
29	Lee Ju-yeon	(South Korea)	1	0	1	25	–	–	27
30	Annouk van der Weijden	(Netherlands)	–	–	25	–	–	–	25
31	Brittany Bowe	(United States)	3	8	0	–	14	–	25
32	Jilleanne Rookard	(United States)	–	–	–	5	19	–	24
33	Dong Feifei	(China)	–	–	15	–	8	–	23
34	Gabriele Hirschbichler	(Germany)	15	6	0	2	–	–	23
35	Alla Shabanova	(Russia)	1	1	19	–	–	–	21
36	Luiza Złotkowska	(Poland)	–	–	–	0	15	–	15
37	Karolína Erbanová	(Czech Republic)	4	–	–	11	–	–	15
38	Shiho Ishizawa	(Japan)	0	0	0	0	11	–	11
39	Katarzyna Woźniak	(Poland)	0	0	–	0	8	–	8
40	Mari Hemmer	(Norway)	0	0	0	6	1	–	7
41	Bente Kraus	(Germany)	–	–	0	0	6	–	6
42	Nicole Garrido	(Canada)	5	0	0	0	–	–	5
43	Anna Rokita	(Austria)	0	0	0	–	4	–	4
44	Eriko Ishino	(Japan)	2	2	0	0	0	–	4
45	Ji Jia	(China)	–	–	–	–	2	–	2
46	Shannon Rempel	(Canada)	2	0	–	–	–	–	2
46	Wang Fei	(China)	–	–	2	–	–	–	2
