= 2011–12 ISU Speed Skating World Cup – Men's 5000 and 10000 metres =

The 5000 and 10000 metres distances for men in the 2011–12 ISU Speed Skating World Cup were contested over six races on six occasions, out of a total of seven World Cup occasions for the season, with the first occasion taking place in Chelyabinsk, Russia, on 18–20 November 2011, and the final occasion taking place in Berlin, Germany, on 9–11 March 2012.

Dutch skaters dominated the 5000/10000 distance, taking 15 out of 18 available podium places over the season, including all gold and silver medals, and only letting three bronze medals slip to other countries' skaters. Bob de Jong successfully defended his title from the previous season, while his countrymen Sven Kramer and Jorrit Bergsma came second and third, respectively.

== Top three ==
Medal	Athlete	Points	Previous season
Gold	(Netherlands) Bob de Jong	510	1st
Silver	(Netherlands) Sven Kramer	440	–
Bronze	(Netherlands) Jorrit Bergsma	435	7th

== Race medallists ==
Occasion #	Location	Date	Distance	Gold	Time	Silver	Time	Bronze	Time	Report
1	Chelyabinsk, Russia	19 November	5000 metres	Jorrit Bergsma; Netherlands	6:18.74	Sven Kramer; Netherlands	6:20.60	Bob de Jong; Netherlands	6:21.96	
2	Astana, Kazakhstan	26 November	5000 metres	Sven Kramer; Netherlands	6:13.38	Jorrit Bergsma; Netherlands	6:15.40	Alexis Contin; France	6:17.43	
3	Heerenveen, Netherlands	3 December	10000 metres	Jorrit Bergsma; Netherlands	12:50.33	Bob de Jong; Netherlands	12:55.11	Bob de Vries; Netherlands	13:03.41	
5	Hamar, Norway	11 February	5000 metres	Bob de Jong; Netherlands	6:21.23	Sven Kramer; Netherlands	6:21.87	Jan Blokhuijsen; Netherlands	6:22.47	
6	Heerenveen, Netherlands	3 March	10000 metres	Bob de Jong; Netherlands	12:58.47	Jorrit Bergsma; Netherlands	12:59.34	Håvard Bøkko; Norway	13:11.95	
7	Berlin, Germany	10 March	5000 metres	Sven Kramer; Netherlands	6:14.69	Bob de Jong; Netherlands	6:17.83	Jonathan Kuck; United States	6:19.98	

== Standings ==
Standings as of 11 March 2012 (end of the season).

#	Name	Nat.	CHE	AST	HVN1	HAM	HVN2	BER	Total
1	Bob de Jong	(Netherlands)	70	40	80	100	100	120	510
2	Sven Kramer	(Netherlands)	80	100	30	80	–	150	440
3	Jorrit Bergsma	(Netherlands)	100	80	100	–	80	75	435
4	Håvard Bøkko	(Norway)	32	60	60	50	70	36	308
5	Alexis Contin	(France)	50	70	35	60	45	40	300
6	Jan Blokhuijsen	(Netherlands)	36	50	–	70	–	90	246
7	Jonathan Kuck	(United States)	60	10	40	–	25	105	240
8	Douwe de Vries	(Netherlands)	28	32	50	–	60	45	215
9	Moritz Geisreiter	(Germany)	45	45	25	40	30	28	213
10	Bart Swings	(Belgium)	25	24	15	36	50	18	168
11	Patrick Beckert	(Germany)	21	21	21	28	35	24	150
12	Ivan Skobrev	(Russia)	24	36	45	–	–	32	137
13	Marco Weber	(Germany)	16	16	25	16	40	21	134
14	Alexej Baumgartner	(Germany)	19	14	35	32	20	12	132
15	Shane Dobbin	(New Zealand)	40	18	–	24	15	14	111
16	Bob de Vries	(Netherlands)	–	–	70	–	35	–	105
17	Sverre Lunde Pedersen	(Norway)	18	28	–	45	–	10	101
18	Dmitry Babenko	(Kazakhstan)	10	19	13	21	25	5	93
19	Denis Yuskov	(Russia)	4	15	15	–	30	16	80
20	Lee Seung-hoon	(South Korea)	14	12	30	18	–	6	80
21	Jordan Belchos	(Canada)	15	6	11	14	13	8	67
22	Hiroki Hirako	(Japan)	12	8	18	5	8	4	55
23	Ewen Fernandez	(France)	8	8	4	12	9	3	44
24	Roger Schneider	(Switzerland)	–	–	8	6	21	2	37
25	Joo Hyong-jun	(South Korea)	11	5	9	10	–	–	35
26	Øystein Grødum	(Norway)	–	–	20	8	–	–	28
27	Patrick Meek	(United States)	5	0	6	0	15	–	26
28	Shani Davis	(United States)	–	25	–	–	–	–	25
28	Ted-Jan Bloemen	(Netherlands)	–	–	–	25	–	–	25
30	Brian Hansen	(United States)	6	–	–	15	–	–	21
31	Fredrik van der Horst	(Norway)	–	–	10	–	11	–	21
32	Kristian Reistad Frederiksen	(Norway)	8	6	–	6	–	–	20
33	Koen Verweij	(Netherlands)	–	–	–	19	–	–	19
34	Rob Hadders	(Netherlands)	–	–	–	–	18	–	18
35	Jan Szymański	(Poland)	4	2	2	8	–	–	16
36	Aleksandr Rumyantsev	(Russia)	–	–	–	4	10	–	14
37	Joshua Lose	(Australia)	6	0	7	0	–	–	13
38	Luca Stefani	(Italy)	0	–	5	0	7	–	12
39	Roland Cieslak	(Poland)	0	0	–	11	–	–	11
39	Haralds Silovs	(Latvia)	–	11	–	–	–	–	11
41	Stefan Waples	(Canada)	–	–	3	0	6	–	9
42	Scott Bickerton	(Canada)	–	–	1	0	5	–	6
43	Norimasa Zaike	(Japan)	0	4	0	–	–	–	4
44	Lucas Makowsky	(Canada)	3	0	–	–	–	–	3
45	Sławomir Chmura	(Poland)	2	0	0	0	–	–	2
45	Martin Hänggi	(Switzerland)	0	0	–	2	–	–	2
45	Robert Lehmann	(Germany)	2	0	–	–	–	–	2
48	Marco Cignini	(Italy)	–	–	–	1	–	–	1
48	Mathieu Giroux	(Canada)	–	1	–	–	–	–	1
48	Teppei Mori	(Japan)	1	0	–	0	–	–	1
