= 2011–12 ISU Speed Skating World Cup – Women's mass start =

The women's mass start in the 2011–12 ISU Speed Skating World Cup was contested over three races on three occasions, out of a total of seven World Cup occasions for the season, with the first occasion involving the event taking place in Astana, Kazakhstan, on 25–27 November 2011, and the final occasion taking place in Berlin, Germany, on 9–11 March 2012.

Mariska Huisman of the Netherlands won the cup, while Claudia Pechstein of Germany came second, and Anna Rokita of Austria came third.

The mass start was a new event for the season.

== Top three ==
Medal	Athlete	Points
Gold	(Netherlands) Mariska Huisman	320
Silver	(Germany) Claudia Pechstein	310
Bronze	(Austria) Anna Rokita	175

== Race medallists ==
Occasion #	Location	Date	Gold	Time	Silver	Time	Bronze	Time	Report
2	Astana, Kazakhstan	27 November	Mariska Huisman; Netherlands	7:26.53	Claudia Pechstein; Germany	7:26.61	Kim Bo-reum; South Korea	7:26.85	
6	Heerenveen, Netherlands	4 March	Mariska Huisman; Netherlands	8:23.46	Claudia Pechstein; Germany	8:24.13	Foske Tamar van der Wal; Netherlands	8:23.47	
7	Berlin, Germany	11 March	Claudia Pechstein; Germany	8:52.06	Mariska Huisman; Netherlands	8:52.32	Anna Rokita; Austria	8:52.60	

== Standings ==
Standings as of 11 March 2012 (end of the season).

#	Name	Nat.	AST	HVN2	BER	Total
1	Mariska Huisman	(Netherlands)	100	100	120	320
2	Claudia Pechstein	(Germany)	80	80	150	310
3	Anna Rokita	(Austria)	10	60	105	175
4	Foske Tamar van der Wal	(Netherlands)	–	70	90	160
5	Maria Lamb	(United States)	60	50	45	155
6	Brooke Lochland	(Australia)	36	0	75	111
7	Kim Bo-reum	(South Korea)	70	–	40	110
8	Janneke Ensing	(Netherlands)	45	40	–	85
9	Karolina Domanska-Ksyt	(Poland)	14	32	28	74
10	Nicole Garrido	(Canada)	24	–	32	56
11	Isabell Ost	(Germany)	18	–	36	54
12	Tatyana Mikhailova	(Belarus)	–	28	24	52
13	Jilleanne Rookard	(United States)	50	–	–	50
14	Mari Hemmer	(Norway)	28	18	0	46
15	Yevgenia Dmitrieva	(Russia)	–	45	–	45
16	Ivanie Blondin	(Canada)	40	–	–	40
17	Olga Graf	(Russia)	–	36	–	36
18	Linda de Vries	(Netherlands)	32	–	–	32
19	Nele Armée	(Belgium)	–	24	–	24
20	Yelena Urvantseva	(Kazakhstan)	21	–	–	21
21	Jelena Peeters	(Belgium)	–	21	–	21
22	Kaitlyn McGregor	(Switzerland)	16	–	–	16
23	Victoria Spence	(Canada)	–	16	–	16
24	Cindy Klassen	(Canada)	14	–	–	14
