= 2011–12 ISU Speed Skating World Cup – Men's mass start =

The men's mass start in the 2011–12 ISU Speed Skating World Cup was contested over three races on three occasions, out of a total of seven World Cup occasions for the season, with the first occasion involving the event taking place in Astana, Kazakhstan, on 25–27 November 2011, and the final occasion taking place in Berlin, Germany, on 9–11 March 2012.

Alexis Contin of France won the cup, while Jorrit Bergsma of the Netherlands came second, and Jonathan Kuck of the United States came third.

The mass start was a new event for the season.

== Top three ==
Medal	Athlete	Points
Gold	(France) Alexis Contin	250
Silver	(Netherlands) Jorrit Bergsma	212
Bronze	(United States) Jonathan Kuck	196

== Race medallists ==
Occasion #	Location	Date	Gold	Time	Silver	Time	Bronze	Time	Report
2	Astana, Kazakhstan	27 November	Lee Seung-hoon; South Korea	9:40.51	Jonathan Kuck; United States	9:40.67	Joo Hyong-jun; South Korea	9:40.81	
6	Heerenveen, Netherlands	4 March	Jonathan Kuck; United States	10:09.89	Arjan Stroetinga; Netherlands	10:10.25	Alexis Contin; France	10:10.31	
7	Berlin, Germany	11 March	Jorrit Bergsma; Netherlands	10:39.27	Alexis Contin; France	10:43.14	Arjan Stroetinga; Netherlands	10:43.82	

== Standings ==
Standings as of 11 March 2012 (end of the season).

#	Name	Nat.	AST	HVN2	BER	Total
1	Alexis Contin	(France)	60	70	120	250
2	Jorrit Bergsma	(Netherlands)	50	12	150	212
3	Jonathan Kuck	(United States)	80	100	16	196
4	Arjan Stroetinga	(Netherlands)	–	80	105	185
5	Lee Seung-hoon	(South Korea)	100	–	75	175
6	Marco Weber	(Germany)	–	18	90	108
7	Alexej Baumgartner	(Germany)	28	50	28	106
8	Joo Hyong-jun	(South Korea)	70	–	24	94
9	Jan Szymański	(Poland)	12	32	45	89
10	Dmitry Babenko	(Kazakhstan)	10	60	18	88
11	Patrick Beckert	(Germany)	32	36	–	68
12	Shane Dobbin	(New Zealand)	–	24	40	64
13	Bart Swings	(Belgium)	24	40	–	64
14	Philippe Riopel	(Canada)	6	16	32	54
15	Jordan Belchos	(Canada)	16	–	36	52
16	Crispijn Ariens	(Belgium)	–	28	21	49
17	Brian Hansen	(United States)	21	14	14	49
18	Kristian Reistad Frederiksen	(Norway)	45	–	–	45
18	Ivan Skobrev	(Russia)	–	45	–	45
20	Douwe de Vries	(Netherlands)	40	–	–	40
21	Trevor Marsicano	(United States)	36	–	–	36
22	Fredrik van der Horst	(Norway)	–	21	–	21
23	Haralds Silovs	(Latvia)	18	–	–	18
24	Bob de Jong	(Netherlands)	14	–	–	14
25	Sun Longjiang	(China)	–	10	–	10
26	Tyler Derraugh	(Canada)	–	8	–	8
27	Zdeněk Haselberger	(Czech Republic)	8	–	–	8
28	Ferre Spruyt	(Belgium)	4	3	–	7
29	Scott Bickerton	(Canada)	–	6	–	6
30	Benjamin Macé	(France)	0	5	–	5
31	Moritz Geisreiter	(Germany)	5	–	–	5
32	Aleksandr Rumyantsev	(Russia)	–	4	–	4
33	Martin Hänggi	(Switzerland)	3	–	–	3
34	Bram Smallenbroek	(Austria)	–	2	–	2
35	Joshua Lose	(Australia)	2	–	–	2
36	Joshua Wood	(United States)	–	1	–	1
37	Milan Sáblík	(Czech Republic)	1	–	–	1
