= 2015–16 ISU Speed Skating World Cup – Women's 1000 metres =

The 1000 meters distance for women in the 2015–16 ISU Speed Skating World Cup will be contested over 7 races on six occasions, out of a total of World Cup occasions for the season, with the first occasion taking place in Calgary, Alberta, Canada, on 13–15 November 2015, and the final occasion taking place in Heerenveen, Netherlands, on 11–13 March 2016.

The defending champion is Brittany Bowe of the United States.

== Top three ==
Position	Athlete	Points	Previous season

== Race medallists ==
WC #	Location	Date	Gold	Time	Silver	Time	Bronze	Time	Report
1	Calgary, Canada	14 November	Heather Richardson-Bergsma; United States	1:12.51; WR	Brittany Bowe; United States	1:12.54	Zhang Hong; China	1:12.65	
2	Salt Lake City, United States	22 November	Brittany Bowe; United States	1:12.18; WR	Zhang Hong; China	1:12.77	Heather Richardson-Bergsma; United States	1:13.45	
3	Inzell, Germany	5 December	Brittany Bowe; United States	1:14.01	Heather Richardson-Bergsma; United States	1:14.52	Lee Sang-hwa; South Korea	1:15.27	
4	Heerenveen, Netherlands	12 December	Brittany Bowe; United States	1:14.49	Heather Richardson-Bergsma; United States	1:15.33	Marrit Leenstra; Netherlands	1:15.77	
5	Stavanger, Norway	29 January	Jorien ter Mors; Netherlands	1:14.52	Brittany Bowe; United States	1:14.61	Marrit Leenstra; Netherlands	1:15.59	
5	Stavanger, Norway	31 January	Brittany Bowe; United States	1:14.35	Marrit Leenstra; Netherlands	1:15.22	Vanessa Bittner; Austria	1:15.52	
6	Heerenveen, Netherlands	13 March	Brittany Bowe; United States	1:14.22	Jorien ter Mors; Netherlands	1:14.44	Heather Richardson-Bergsma; United States	1:15.07	

== Standings ==
#	Name	Nat.	CGY	SLC	INZ	HVN1	STA1	STA2	HVN2	Total
1	Brittany Bowe	(United States)	80	100	100	100	80	100		560
2	Heather Richardson-Bergsma	(United States)	100	70	80	80	24	50		404
3	Marrit Leenstra	(Netherlands)	45	60	50	70	70	80		375
4	Vanessa Bittner	(Austria)	50	40	40	60	45	70		305
5	Olga Fatkulina	(Russia)	24	45	28	40	60	60		257
6	Zhang Hong	(China)	70	80	—	45	32	—		227
7	Li Qishi	(China)	25	50	60	24	40	28		227
8	Karolina Erbanová	(Czech Republic)	36	21	18	50	50	14		189
9	Miho Takagi	(Japan)	11	28	32	28	40	45		184
10	Ida Njåtun	(Norway)	40	8	45	36	18	16		163
11	Margot Boer	(Netherlands)	32	32	16	18	28	36		162
12	Jorien ter Mors	(Netherlands)	60	—	—	—	100	—		160
13	Yekaterina Shikhova	(Russia)	0	25	36	32	—	32		125
14	Sanneke de Neeling	(Netherlands)	21	24	24	21	—	18		108
15	Hege Bøkko	(Norway)	6	15	12	8	21	40		102
16	Gabriele Hirschbichler	(Germany)	16	36	14	8	16	10		100
17	Lee Sang-hwa	(South Korea)	28	—	70	—	—	—		98
18	Ayaka Kikuchi	(Japan)	18	16	21	16	12	12		95
19	Nao Kodaira	(Japan)	8	12	5	19	14	24		82
20	Yu Jing	(China)	15	14	—	15	10	21		75
21	Maki Tsuji	(Japan)	14	18	8	12	5	5		62
22	Erina Kamiya	(Japan)	4	6	25	10	6	—		51
23	Kaylin Irvine	(Canada)	0	0	8	25	8	8		49
24	Martina Sábliková	(Czech Republic)	2	11	4	11	19	—		47
25	Nadezhda Aseyeva	(Russia)	0	19	6	0	11	6		42
26	Janine Smit	(Netherlands)	—	—	6	—	8	25		39
27	Roxanne Dufter	(Germany)	12	10	10	0	—	—		32
28	Anice Das	(Netherlands)	—	—	—	—	25	6		31
29	Yekaterina Aydova	(Kazakhstan)	10	5	11	4	1	0		31
30	Kim Hyun-yung	(South Korea)	0	0	19	6	0	4		29
31	Margarita Ryzhova	(Russia)	0	0	15	14	—	—		29
32	Sugar Todd	(United States)	1	8	0	0	0	11		20
33	Kali Christ	(Canada)	0	—	—	—	0	19		19
34	Ivanie Blondin	(Canada)	19	—	—	—	—	—		19
35	Zhan Xue	(China)	—	—	—	—	2	15		17
36	Park Seung-Hi	(South Korea)	5	0	—	—	4	8		17
37	Heather McLean	(Canada)	6	2	1	6	—	2		17
38	Elizaveta Kazelina	(Russia)	—	0	—	—	15	—		15
39	Hao Jiachen	(China)	8	6	—	—	—	—		14
40	Natalia Czerwonka	(Poland)	0	1	2	—	6	—		9
41	Linda de Vries	(Netherlands)	0	4	0	—	—	—		4
42	Paige Schwartzburg	(United States)	0	0	0	2	0	0		2
43	Anastasia Bucsis	(United States)	—	—	—	—	0	1		1
44	Kim Min-sun	(South Korea)	—	0	0	1	0	0		1
