= World and Olympic records set at the 1988 Winter Olympics =

Numerous world records and Olympic records were set in various events at the 1988 Winter Olympics in Calgary.

== Ski Jumping ==
Finnish ski jumper Matti Nykänen became the first person to win both the 70 metre and 90 metre events in a single Olympic Games.

== Speed Skating ==
All of the long track world (WR) and Olympic records (OR) that occurred during these Games were later broken at succeeding Winter Olympics and other world events.

Date	Event	NOC	Name	Time	Type	Ref
February 14	Men's 500 metres	East Germany	Uwe-Jens Mey	36.45	(WR)	
February 17	Men's 5000 metres	Sweden	Tomas Gustafson	6:44.63	(OR)	
February 18	Men's 1000 metres	Soviet Union	Nikolay Gulyayev	1:13.03	(OR)	
February 20	Men's 1500 metres	East Germany	André Hoffmann	1:52.06	(WR)	
February 21	Men's 10000 metres	Sweden	Tomas Gustafson	13:48.20	(WR)	
February 22	Women's 500 metres	United States	Bonnie Blair	39.10	(WR)	
February 23	Women's 3000 metres	Netherlands	Yvonne van Gennip	4:11.94	(WR)	
February 26	Women's 1000 metres	East Germany	Christa Luding-Rothenburger	1:17.65	(WR)	
February 27	Women's 1500 metres	Netherlands	Yvonne van Gennip	2:00.68	(OR)	
February 28	Women's 5000 metres	Netherlands	Yvonne van Gennip	7:14.13	(WR)	
