= Zofia Nehringowa =

Polish speed skater

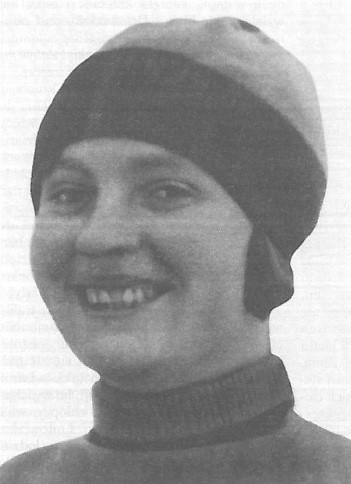

Personal information
- Born: 10 May 1910 Warsaw, Poland
- Died: 1 January 1972 (aged 61) Warsaw, Poland

Sport
- Country: Poland
- Sport: Speed skating
- Retired: 1939

Zofia Nehringowa (sometimes identified by her married surnames Duda and later Krzeszczyk; 10 May 1910 – 1 January 1972) was a Polish long track speed skater in the late 1920s and 1930s.

== Biography ==
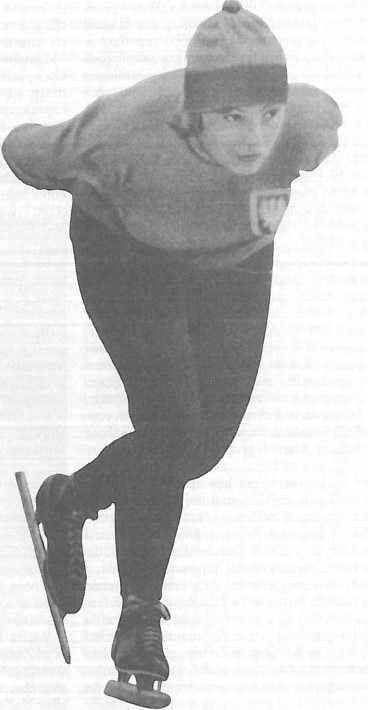
Nehringowa skating circa 1935

Born in Warsaw, Nehringowa started skating when she was 15 years old at the Warszawskie Towarzystwo Łyżwiarskie (Warsaw Ice Skating Society) and was trained by Edward Nehring (born 1892). From 1930 she skated for KS Polonia Warszawa.

Twelve times she was the Polish champion, including 4 times champion at the Polish Allround Championships in 1931, 1932, 1935, and 1939. She won the 5000m national title in 1931 and 1934.

Her results in the 500m (1:02.00 from 15 February 1931), 1000m (2:16.4 from 26 January 1929) 1500m (3:28.0 from 27 January 1929), 3000m (6:52.8 from 8 February 1931) and 5000 m (11:30.5 from 15 February 1931) were approved by the International Skating Union (ISU) on 3 December 1931 as the first women's speed skating world records.

Nehringowa competed during 1932 European Speed Skating Championships for Men in Davos, because there was not a rule yet that women's were not allowed to enter races of the men's championships she could take ride all four the distances. Newspapers wrote about this conspicuity and an Austrian skater even withdrew demonstratively from the championship, refusing to compete at the same time against a woman. During these race she broke the women's world record in the 1500m (3:10.4 on 10 January 1932). A few days later she took back the world record in the 1000m from Liselotte Landbeck (2:03.4 on 17 January 1932 in Engelberg). These successes brought her the 10th place in the Polish Sports Personality of the Year (Plebiscyt Przeglądu Sportowego 1932) for the best Polish athlete in 1932.

On 9 February 1935 she improved her own world record in the 3000m to 6:22,40, and the day afterwards also in the 5000m to 10:54,80. On 30 December 1935 in Vienna, she also set a world record in the 10,000m (23:48,5), which was never officially beaten, because in 1953 the ISU decided not to record women's records at this distance.

During her career she rode sixteen Polish national records in the individual distances.

Nehringowa represented her nation at the World Allround Speed Skating Championships for Women in 1939 where she finished 5th overall (in the individual distances she was 8th (500 m), 4th (3000 m), 7th (1000 m) and 3rd (10,000 m).

On 20 September 1936 she was awarded the Silver Cross of Merit, awarded by Colonel Władysław Kiliński.

== Personal life ==
In 1927, at 16 or 17, she married her trainer Edward Nehring, then about 35, and had two children with him. They divorced, and after World War II she married Nehring a second time.

== Records ==
=== World records ===
Nehringowa was the first person to set world records recognized by the ISU. She set the world records in all individual distances (500 m, 1000 m, 1500 m, 3000 m, 5000 m and 10000 m).

Distance	Time	Date	Location	Ref
500 m	1:02.0	15 February 1931	Warszawa	
1000 m	2:16.4	26 January 1929	Warszawa	
1000 m	2.03,4	17 January 1932	Engelberg	
1500 m	3:28.0	27 January 1929	Warszawa	
1500 m	3:10.4	10 January 1932	Davos	
3000 m	6:52.8	8 February 1931	Warszawa	
3000 m	6.22,4	9 February 1935	Warszawa	
5000 m	11:30.5	15 February 1931	Warszawa	
5000 m	10:54.8	10 February 1935	Warszawa	
10000 m	23:48.5	30 December 1935	Wien	

=== Personal records ===
Personal records
Women's speed skating
Event	Result	Date	Location	Notes
500 m	58.7	10 February 1935	Warszawa (POL)	
1000 m	2:01.4	9 January 1932	Davos (SUI)	
1500 m	3:07.0	9 February 1935	Warszawa (POL)	
3000 m	6:22.4	9 February 1935	Warszawa (POL)	
5000 m	10:54.8	9 February 1935	Warszawa (POL)	
10000 m	23:48.5	30 December 1935	Wien (AUT)	
