= 2012 World Sprint Speed Skating Championships =

World championship

World Sprint Speed Skating Championships
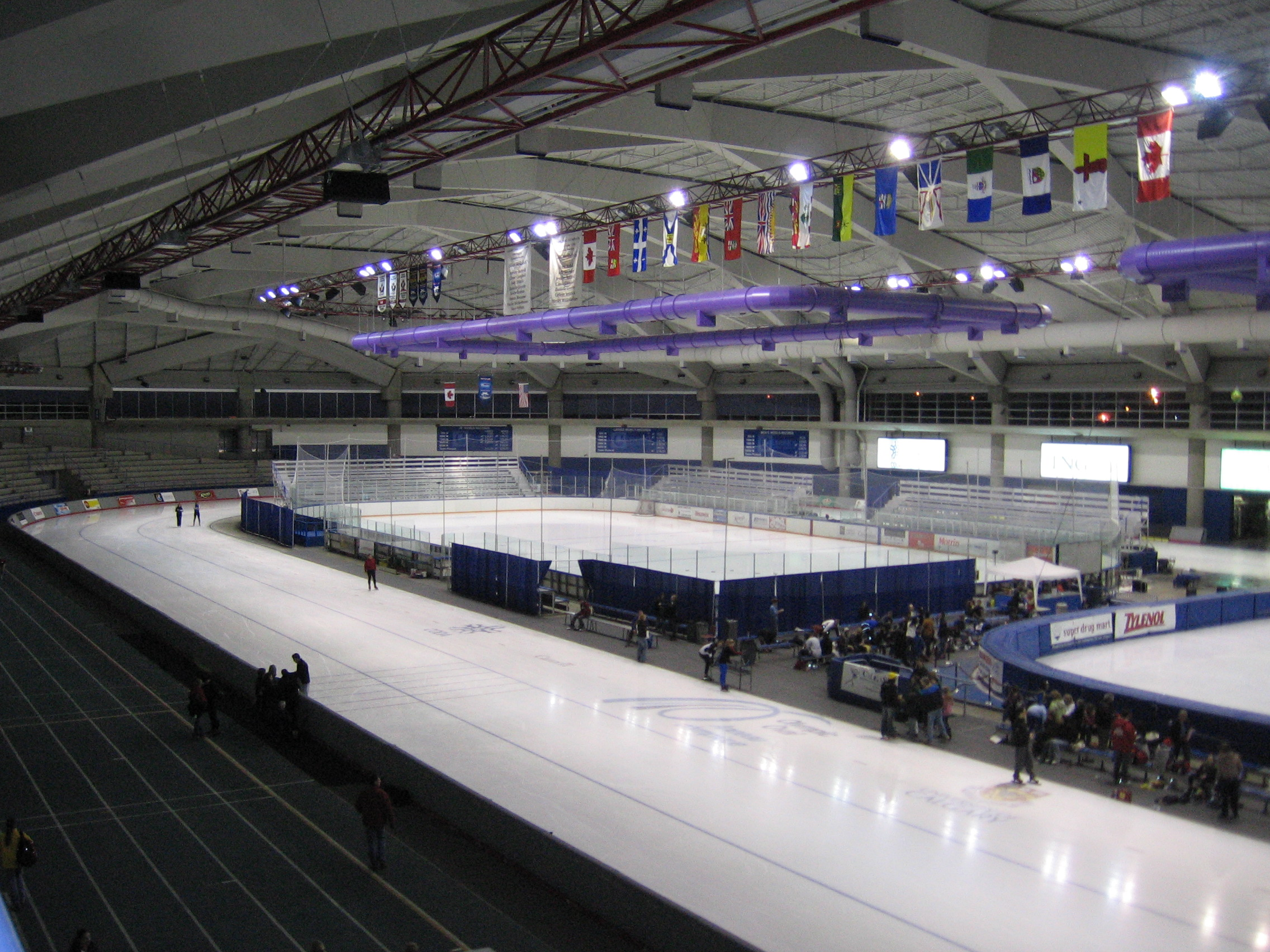
- Olympic Oval (Calgary)
- Venue: Olympic Oval (Calgary)
- Dates: 28 and 29 January 2011
- Competitors: 34 men 28 women

Medalist men
1st place, gold medalist(s)		Stefan Groothuis	Netherlands
2nd place, silver medalist(s)		Lee Kyou-hyuk	South Korea
3rd place, bronze medalist(s)		Mo Tae-bum	South Korea

Medalist women
1st place, gold medalist(s)		Yu Jing	China
2nd place, silver medalist(s)		Christine Nesbitt	Canada
3rd place, bronze medalist(s)		Zhang Hong	China

The 2012 World Sprint Speed Skating Championships were a long track speed skating event held on 28 and 29 January 2012 in Olympic Oval, Calgary, Canada.

== Men championships ==
=== Sprint results ===
Stefan Groothuis skated a new points record (136.810), the previous record belonged to Jeremy Wotherspoon (137.230 [2003])

Rank	Name	Nation	500 m (1)	1000 m (1)	500 m (2)	1000 m (2)	Total	Behind
1st place, gold medalist(s)	Stefan Groothuis	Netherlands	34.84	1:07.50	34.74	1:06.96	136.810WR	
2nd place, silver medalist(s)	Lee Kyou-hyuk	South Korea	34.33	1:08.01	34.67	1:07.99	137.000	+0.18
3rd place, bronze medalist(s)	Mo Tae-bum	South Korea	34.67	1:07.99	34.42	1:07.99	137.080	+0.26
4	Mika Poutala	Finland	34.62	1:08.20	34.38	1:08.34	137.270	+0.45
5	Shani Davis	United States	35.16	1:07.25	35.03	1:07.11	137.360	+0.54
6	Dmitry Lobkov	Russia	34.46	1:08.10	34.71	1:08.40	137.420	+0.60
7	Hein Otterspeer	Netherlands	34.72	1:08.54	34.48	1:08.08	137.510	+0.69
8	Joji Kato	Japan	34.56	1:09.08	34.35	1:08.68	137.790	+0.98
9	Jamie Gregg	Canada	34.69	1:09.13	34.48	1:08.24	137.855	+1.05
10	Muncef Ouardi	Canada	34.54	1:09.06	34.69	1:08.57	138.045	+1.24
11	Aleksey Yesin	Russia	35.26	1:08.51	34.77	1:07.84	138.205	+1.40
12	Artyom Kuznetsov	Russia	34.92	1:09.27	34.63	1:08.77	138.570	+1.76
13	Denny Morrison	Canada	35.25	1:08.05	35.20	1:08.28	138.615	+1.81
14	Artur Waś	Poland	34.89	1:09.21	34.61	1:09.44	138.825	+2.02
15	Yūya Oikawa	Japan	34.85	1:10.07	34.43	1:09.54	139.085	+2.28
16	Sjoerd de Vries	Netherlands	35.53	1:09.45	35.01	1:07.72	139.125	+2.32
17	Haralds Silovs	Latvia	35.56	1:08.31	35.55	1:07.98	139.255	+2.45
18	Pim Schipper	Netherlands	35.72	1:08.87	35.18	1:08.32	139.495	+2.69
19	Samuel Schwarz	Germany	35.65	1:09.02	35.16	1:08.50	139.570	+2.76
20	Espen Aarnes Hvammen	Norway	35.16	1:09.03	35.19	1:09.54	139.635	+2.83
21	Mirko Giacomo Nenzi	Italy	35.63	1:08.80	35.15	1:09.42	139.890	+3.08
22	Denis Kuzin	Kazakhstan	35.80	1:08.65	35.58	1:08.55	139.980	+3.17
23	Ryohei Haga	Japan	35.10	1:10.48	34.84	1:09.69	140.025	+3.22
24	Benjamin Macé	France	36.04	1:08.41	36.35	1:09.12	141.155	+4.35
NQ25	Roman Krech	Kazakhstan	34.91	1:09.05	34.97			
NQ26	Daniel Greig	Australia	35.54	1:09.38	34.99			
NQ27	Lee Ki-ho	South Korea	35.17	1:10.47	35.04			
NQ28	Ermanno Ioratti	Italy	35.26	1:09.97	35.22			
NQ29	Håvard Holmefjord Lorentzen	Norway	35.66	1:09.16	35.72			
NQ30	Denny Ihle	Germany	35.23	1:10.78	35.43			
NQ31	Mitchell Whitmore	United States	35.59	1:10.20	35.78			
NQ32	Bram Smallenbroek	Austria	37.09	1:11.02	36.71			
NQ33	Marius Paraschivoiu	Romania	35.89	1:11.64	DQ			
NQ34	Lee Kang-seok	South Korea	35.11	NS				

NQ = Not qualified for the second 1000m (only the best 24 are qualified)
DQ = disqualified

== Women championships ==
=== Sprint results ===
The previous record of 149.305 set by Cindy Klassen in 2006 was beaten by Yu Jing and Christine Nesbitt, both of whom skated in the same pair for the second 1000m.

Rank	Name	Nation	500 m (1)	1000 m (1)	500 m (2)	1000 m (2)	Total	Behind
1st place, gold medalist(s)	Yu Jing	China	37.72	1:14.43	36.94 WR	1:13.47	148.610WR	
2nd place, silver medalist(s)	Christine Nesbitt	Canada	37.93	1:12.68 WR	37.89	1:12.94	148.630	+0.02
3rd place, bronze medalist(s)	Zhang Hong	China	37.63	1:14.44	37.87	1:13.95	149.700	+1.09
4	Margot Boer	Netherlands	37.71	1:14.37	37.83	1:14.17	149.810	+1.20
5	Annette Gerritsen	Netherlands	37.67	1:14.67	37.75	1:14.33	149.920	+1.31
6	Heather Richardson	United States	38.07	1:14.49	37.85	1:14.05	150.190	+1.58
7	Wang Beixing	China	37.50	1:15.75	37.32	1:15.07	150.230	+1.62
8	Marrit Leenstra	Netherlands	38.15	1:14.16	38.29	1:13.89	150.465	+1.86
9	Jenny Wolf	Germany	37.35	1:14.95	38.04	1:15.59	150.665	+2.06
10	Thijsje Oenema	Netherlands	38.09	1:14.92	37.88	1:14.67	150.765	+2.16
11	Lee Sang-hwa	South Korea	37.70	1:15.94	37.36	1:15.58	150.820	+2.21
12	Olga Fatkulina	Russia	38.33	1:15.28	38.03	1:14.86	151.430	+2.82
13	Nao Kodaira	Japan	38.07	1:15.24	38.05	1:15.52	151.500	+2.89
14	Judith Hesse	Germany	38.05	1:15.83	37.79	1:17.00	152.255	+3.65
15	Yukana Nishina	Japan	38.12	1:16.03	38.17	1:15.94	152.275	+3.67
16	Yekaterina Aydova	Kazakhstan	38.27	1:16.17	38.15	1:15.80	152.405	+3.80
17	Karolína Erbanová	Czech Republic	38.17	1:16.97	38.11	1:15.40	152.465	+3.86
18	Brittany Bowe	United States	38.67	1:15.50	38.40	1:15.80	152.720	+4.11
19	Miho Takagi	Japan	38.75	1:15.48	38.75	1:15.62	153.050	+4.44
20	Svetlana Kaykan	Russia	38.33	1:17.94	38.04	1:16.60	153.640	+5.03
21	Svetlana Radkevich	Belarus	38.80	1:17.61	38.55	1:16.79	154.550	+5.94
22	Irina Arshinova	Russia	39.07	1:16.47	38.91	1:17.27	154.850	+6.24
23	Kaylin Irvine	Canada	39.09	1:17.26	38.87	1:16.71	154.945	+6.34
24	Kim Hyun-yung	South Korea	38.98	1:17.65	38.44	1:17.45	154.970	+6.36
NQ25	Shannon Rempel	Canada	38.75	1:16.50	38.54			
NQ26	Monique Angermüller	Germany	1:10.88	1:15.37	DNS			
NQ27	Elina Risku	Finland	DQ					

NQ = Not qualified for the second 1000m (only the best 24 are qualified)
DQ = disqualified

== Rules ==
All participating skaters are allowed to skate the two 500 meters and one 1000 meters; 24 skaters may take part on the second 1000 meters. These 24 skaters are determined by the samalog standings after the three skated distances, and comparing these lists as follows:

1. Skaters among the top 24 on both lists are qualified.
2. To make up a total of 24, skaters are then added in order of their best rank on either list.
