= 2015–16 ISU Speed Skating World Cup – World Cup 2 – Women's 1000 metres =

The women's 1000 metres race of the 2015–16 ISU Speed Skating World Cup 2, arranged in the Utah Olympic Oval, in Salt Lake City, United States, was held on November 22, 2015.

Brittany Bowe of the United States won the race on a new world record, while Zhang Hong of China came second, and Heather Richardson-Bergsma of the United States came third. Yekaterina Shikhova of Russia won the Division B race.

== Results ==
The race took place on Sunday, November 22, with Division B scheduled in the morning session, at 09:00, and Division A scheduled in the afternoon session, at 13:00.

=== Division A ===
Rank	Name	Nat.	Pair	Lane	Time	WC points	GWC points
1st place, gold medalist(s)	Brittany Bowe	(United States)	10	o	1:12.18 WR	100	100
2nd place, silver medalist(s)	Zhang Hong	(China)	9	i	1:12.77	80	80
3rd place, bronze medalist(s)	Heather Richardson-Bergsma	(United States)	10	i	1:13.45	70	70
4	Marrit Leenstra	(Netherlands)	8	i	1:13.93	60	60
5	Li Qishi	(China)	6	i	1:13.94	50	50
6	Olga Fatkulina	(Russia)	6	o	1:14.13	45	—
7	Vanessa Bittner	(Austria)	9	o	1:14.65	40	
8	Gabriele Hirschbichler	(Germany)	4	i	1:14.682	36	
9	Margot Boer	(Netherlands)	7	o	1:14.689	32	
10	Miho Takagi	(Japan)	2	i	1:14.75	28	
11	Sanneke de Neeling	(Netherlands)	5	i	1:14.92	24	
12	Karolína Erbanová	(Czech Republic)	7	i	1:15.24	21	
13	Maki Tsuji	(Japan)	3	i	1:15.25	18	
14	Ayaka Kikuchi	(Japan)	5	o	1:15.29	16	
15	Yu Jing	(China)	4	o	1:15.33	14	
16	Nao Kodaira	(Japan)	1	o	1:15.44	12	
17	Roxanne Dufter	(Germany)	3	o	1:15.45	10	
18	Ida Njåtun	(Norway)	8	o	1:15.75	8	
19	Hao Jiachen	(China)	1	i	1:15.94	6	
20	Yekaterina Aydova	(Kazakhstan)	2	o	1:16.23	5	

Note: WR = world record.

=== Division B ===
Rank	Name	Nat.	Pair	Lane	Time	WC points
1	Yekaterina Shikhova	(Russia)	9	o	1:15.52	25
2	Nadezhda Aseyeva	(Russia)	6	i	1:15.55	19
3	Hege Bøkko	(Norway)	12	i	1:15.69	15
4	Martina Sáblíková	(Czech Republic)	10	i	1:15.94	11
5	Sugar Todd	(United States)	10	o	1:15.97	8
6	Erina Kamiya	(Japan)	11	o	1:15.98	6
7	Linda de Vries	(Netherlands)	7	i	1:16.10	4
8	Heather McLean	(Canada)	12	o	1:16.13	2
9	Natalia Czerwonka	(Poland)	5	i	1:16.33	1
10	Lotte van Beek	(Netherlands)	4	i	1:16.40	—
11	Margarita Ryzhova	(Russia)	9	i	1:16.46	
12	Kaylin Irvine	(Canada)	8	o	1:16.54	
13	Elizaveta Kazelina	(Russia)	2	o	1:16.56	
14	Luiza Złotkowska	(Poland)	3	o	1:16.59	
15	Kim Hyun-yung	(South Korea)	8	i	1:16.67	
16	Jang Mi	(South Korea)	7	o	1:16.69	
17	Kim Min-sun	(South Korea)	2	i	1:16.80	
18	Paige Schwartzburg	(United States)	5	o	1:16.84	
19	Park Seung-hi	(South Korea)	11	i	1:17.31	
20	Marsha Hudey	(Canada)	6	o	1:17.59	
21	Tatyana Mikhailova	(Belarus)	1	i	1:17.90	
22	Kelly Gunther	(United States)	3	i	1:17.98	
23	Yvonne Daldossi	(Italy)	1	o	1:18.95	
24	Elina Risku	(Finland)	4	o	1:18.99	
