= 2015–16 ISU Speed Skating World Cup – World Cup 1 – Women's 1000 metres =

The women's 1000 metres race of the 2015–16 ISU Speed Skating World Cup 1, arranged in the Olympic Oval, in Calgary, Alberta, Canada, was held on 14 November 2015.

Heather Richardson-Bergsma of the United States won the race on a new world record, while compatriot and previous world record holder Brittany Bowe came second, also beating the old record, and Zhang Hong of China came third. Li Qishi of China won the Division B race.

== Results ==
The race took place on Saturday, 14 November, with Division B scheduled in the morning session, at 09:30, and Division A scheduled in the afternoon session, at 12:30.

=== Division A ===
Rank	Name	Nat.	Pair	Lane	Time	WC points	GWC points
1st place, gold medalist(s)	Heather Richardson-Bergsma	(United States)	9	i	1:12.51 WR	100	100
2nd place, silver medalist(s)	Brittany Bowe	(United States)	8	o	1:12.54	80	80
3rd place, bronze medalist(s)	Zhang Hong	(China)	9	o	1:12.65 NR	70	70
4	Jorien ter Mors	(Netherlands)	10	o	1:12:66 NR	60	60
5	Vanessa Bittner	(Austria)	8	i	1:13.68 NR	50	50
6	Marrit Leenstra	(Netherlands)	6	o	1:14.35	45	—
7	Ida Njåtun	(Norway)	5	i	1:14.37 NR	40	
8	Karolína Erbanová	(Czech Republic)	10	i	1:14.98	36	
9	Margot Boer	(Netherlands)	2	i	1:15.09	32	
10	Lee Sang-hwa	(South Korea)	1	i	1:15.24	28	
11	Olga Fatkulina	(Russia)	5	o	1:15.26	24	
12	Sanneke de Neeling	(Netherlands)	7	o	1:15.41	21	
13	Ayaka Kikuchi	(Japan)	6	i	1:15.54	18	
14	Gabriele Hirschbichler	(Germany)	3	i	1:15.56	16	
15	Maki Tsuji	(Japan)	4	i	1:15.77	14	
16	Roxanne Dufter	(Germany)	4	o	1:15.90	12	
17	Yekaterina Aydova	(Kazakhstan)	7	i	1:16.42	10	
18	Nao Kodaira	(Japan)	2	o	1:16.46	8	
19	Heather McLean	(Canada)	3	o	1:17.07	6	
20	Park Seung-hi	(South Korea)	1	o	1:17.18	5	

Note: WR = world record, NR = national record.

=== Division B ===
Rank	Name	Nat.	Pair	Lane	Time	WC points
1	Li Qishi	(China)	12	o	1:14.44	25
2	Ivanie Blondin	(Canada)	5	i	1:14.72	19
3	Yu Jing	(China)	7	i	1:14.91	15
4	Miho Takagi	(Japan)	10	o	1:15.11	11
5	Hao Jiachen	(China)	8	i	1:15.55	8
6	Hege Bøkko	(Norway)	10	i	1:15.71	6
7	Erina Kamiya	(Japan)	9	i	1:15.82	4
8	Martina Sáblíková	(Czech Republic)	6	o	1:15.86	2
9	Sugar Todd	(United States)	5	o	1:15.89	1
10	Margarita Ryzhova	(Russia)	9	o	1:15.97	—
11	Yekaterina Shikhova	(Russia)	11	o	1:15.98	
12	Kim Hyun-yung	(South Korea)	4	o	1:16.22	
13	Kaylin Irvine	(Canada)	11	i	1:16.24	
14	Linda de Vries	(Netherlands)	12	i	1:16.41	
15	Jang Mi	(South Korea)	6	i	1:16.50	
16	Nadezhda Aseyeva	(Russia)	8	o	1:16.71	
17	Kali Christ	(Canada)	2	i	1:16.76	
18	Natalia Czerwonka	(Poland)	7	o	1:16.98	
19	Marsha Hudey	(Canada)	2	o	1:17.01	
20	Paige Schwartzburg	(United States)	3	i	1:17.28	
21	Francesca Bettrone	(Italy)	1	i	1:17.60	
22	Elina Risku	(Finland)	4	i	1:18.19 NR	
23	Ksenia Sadovskaya	(Belarus)	3	o	1:19.84	

Note: NR = national record.
