= Liselotte Landbeck =

Austrian skater (1916–2013)

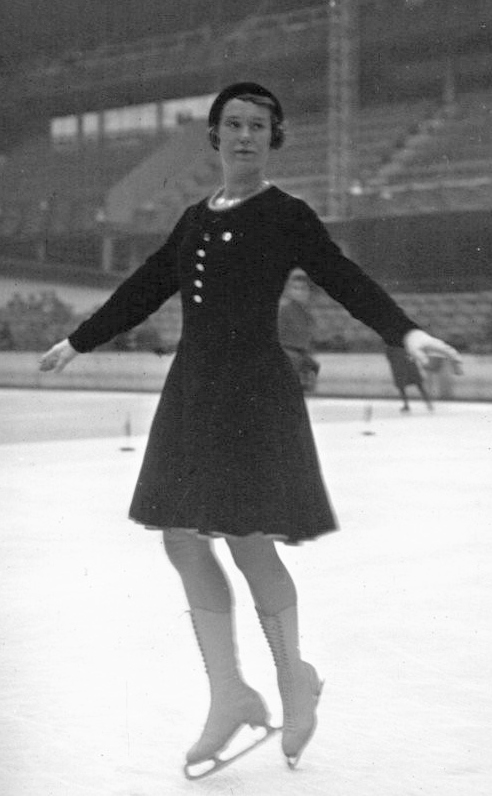
- Liselotte Landbeck at the 1932 European Championships

Personal information
- Born: 13 January 1916 Vienna, Austria-Hungary
- Died: 15 February 2013 (aged 97) Quintal, Haute-Savoie, France

Figure skating career
- Skating club: WEV, Wien
- Retired: 1936
Medal record
Representing Austria
Ladies' Figure skating
World Championships
Bronze medal – third place	1934 Oslo	Ladies' singles
European Championships
Silver medal – second place	1935 St. Moritz	Ladies' singles
Silver medal – second place	1934 Prague	Ladies' singles

Liselotte Landbeck (13 January 1916 – 15 February 2013) was an Austrian athlete who competed at a high level in both figure skating and speed skating in the 1930s. In figure skating, she won the bronze medal at the 1934 World Championships.

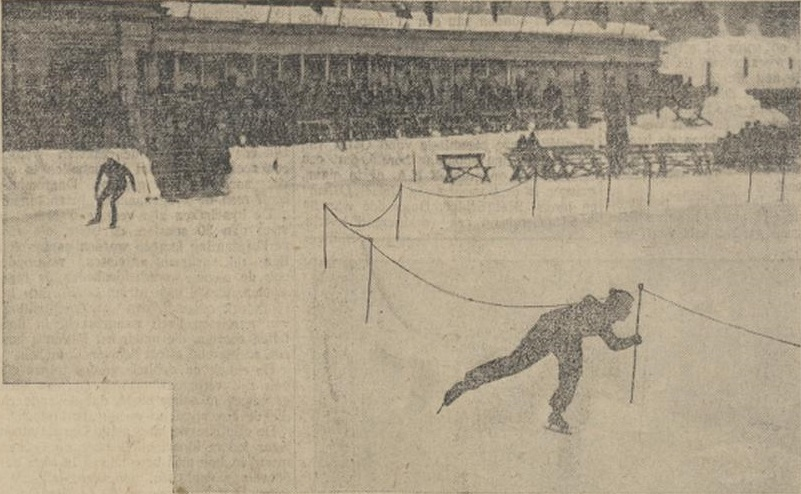
Elly Taconis versus Landbeck (right) during the first official international women's long track speed skating competition in 1932 in Davos.

In speed skating, Landbeck competed at the first ever international long track speed skating competition for women during the 1932 European Speed Skating Championships in Davos on 9–10 January 1932. She won this competition against Dutchwomen Elly Taconis by setting a new world record in the 500m as well as the world record in the 1000 m. Landbeck won the next season the first unofficial 1933 World Allround Speed Skating Championships for Women.

Although she originally was from Vienna, in 1935, she married the Belgian figure skater Robert Verdun and moved to that country. She represented Belgium in the 1936 Winter Olympics.

== Competitive highlights (figure skating) ==
Event	1932	1933	1934	1935	1936	1937
Winter Olympics					4th	
World Championships		6th	3rd			
European Championships	5th	6th	2nd	2nd	4th	
Austrian Championships	5th	2nd	1st	1st		
Belgian Championships					1st	1st
Czechoslovak Championships		1st (Note: Guest skater)				
