= 2011–12 ISU Speed Skating World Cup – World Cup 4 =

The fourth competition weekend of the 2011–12 ISU Speed Skating World Cup was held in the Utah Olympic Oval in Salt Lake City, United States, from Saturday, January 21, until Sunday, January 22, 2012.

== Schedule of events ==
The schedule of the event is below:

Date	Time	Events
January 21	20:00 CET	500 m women 500 m men 1000 m women 1000 m men
January 22	20:00 CET	500 m women 500 m men 1000 m women 1000 m men

== Medal summary ==
=== Men's events ===
Event	Race #	Gold	Time	Silver	Time	Bronze	Time	Report
500 m	1	Keiichiro Nagashima; Japan	34.37	Jan Smeekens; Netherlands	34.40	Tucker Fredricks; United States	34.45	
500 m	2	Dmitry Lobkov; Russia	34.54	Keiichiro Nagashima; Japan	34.57	Tucker Fredricks; United States	34.60	
1000 m	1	Shani Davis; United States	1:07.20	Denny Morrison; Canada	1:07.39	Stefan Groothuis; Netherlands	1:07.45	
1000 m	2	Shani Davis; United States	1:07.69	Stefan Groothuis; Netherlands	1:07.94	Pekka Koskela; Finland	1:08.17	

=== Women's events ===
Event	Race #	Gold	Time	Silver	Time	Bronze	Time	Report
500 m	1	Lee Sang-hwa; South Korea	37.36	Nao Kodaira; Japan	37.42	Heather Richardson; United States	37.58	
500 m	2	Lee Sang-hwa; South Korea	37.27	Yu Jing; China	37.51	Jenny Wolf; Germany	37.62	
1000 m	1	Christine Nesbitt; Canada	1:13.36	Heather Richardson; United States	1:13.99	Ireen Wüst; Netherlands	1:14.51	
1000 m	2	Laurine van Riessen; Netherlands	1:14.21	Marrit Leenstra; Netherlands	1:14.41	Monique Angermüller; Germany	1:14.83	
