= 2011–12 ISU Speed Skating World Cup – World Cup 5 =

The fifth competition weekend of the 2011–12 ISU Speed Skating World Cup was held in the Vikingskipet arena in Hamar, Norway, from Saturday, 11 February, until Sunday, 12 February 2012.

== Schedule of events ==
The schedule of the event is below:

Date	Time	Events
11 February	15:15 CET	1500 m women 5000 m men
12 February	12:30 CET	3000 m women 1500 m men Team pursuit women Team pursuit men

== Medal summary ==
=== Men's events ===
Event	Gold	Time	Silver	Time	Bronze	Time	Report
1500 m	Shani Davis; United States	1:47.08	Håvard Bøkko; Norway	1:47.21	Stefan Groothuis; Netherlands	1:47.55	
5000 m	Bob de Jong; Netherlands	6:21.23	Sven Kramer; Netherlands	6:21.87	Jan Blokhuijsen; Netherlands	6:22.47	
Team pursuit	Russia; Ivan Skobrev; Yevgeny Lalenkov; Denis Yuskov	3:45.42	South Korea; Joo Hyung-joon; Ko Byung-wook; Lee Seung-hoon	3:46.68	Germany; Robert Lehmann; Alexej Baumgartner; Patrick Beckert	3:46.87	

=== Women's events ===
Event	Gold	Time	Silver	Time	Bronze	Time	Report
1500 m	Ireen Wüst; Netherlands	1:56.99	Christine Nesbitt; Canada	1:57.03	Marrit Leenstra; Netherlands	1:57.59	
3000 m	Martina Sáblíková; Czech Republic	4:05.88	Stephanie Beckert; Germany	4:06.42	Ireen Wüst; Netherlands	4:06.57	
Team pursuit	Russia; Yekaterina Lobysheva; Yekaterina Shikhova; Yuliya Skokova	3:04.83	Poland; Natalia Czerwonka; Luiza Złotkowska; Katarzyna Woźniak	3:05.57	South Korea; Kim Bo-reum; Lee Ju-yeon; Noh Seon-yeong	3:05.65	
