= Anne Henning =

American speed skater (born 1955)

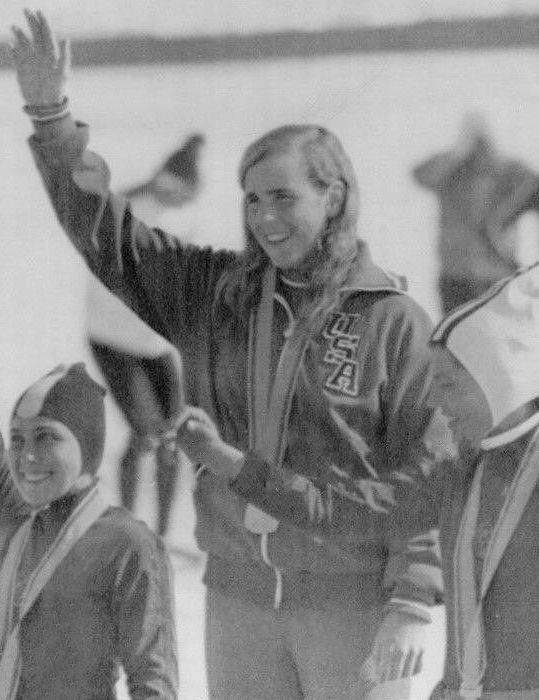
- Henning (center) at the 1972 Olympics

Personal information
- Born: September 6, 1955 (age 70) Raleigh, North Carolina, U.S.
- Height: 170 cm (5 ft 7 in)
- Weight: 66 kg (146 lb)

Sport
- Sport: Speed skating
- Club: Northbrook Speedskating Club

Achievements and titles
- Personal best(s): 500 m – 42.5 (1972); 1000 m – 1:27.3 (1972); 1500 m – 2:27.30 (1972); 3000 m – 5:25.9 (1971)
Medal record
Representing the United States
Olympic Games
Gold medal – first place	1972 Sapporo	500 m
Bronze medal – third place	1972 Sapporo	1000 m
World Championships
Silver medal – second place	1971 Inzell	Sprint

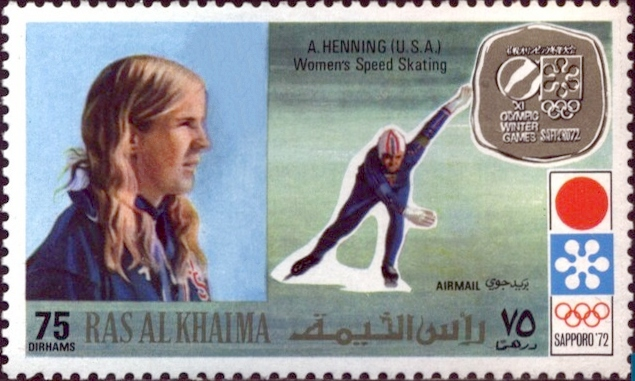
Henning on a 1972 UAE stamp

Anne Elizabeth Henning (born September 6, 1955) is an American retired speed skater. She grew up in Northbrook, Illinois, and started in short track speed skating, but then, like many short track speed skaters before and after her, switched to long track speed skating. In 1971, 15-year-old Henning won silver at the ISU Sprint Championships, the forerunner of the World Sprint Championships. During those championships, she set new world records in both her 500 m races.

In 1972, Henning broke the world records on the 500 m and the 1,000 m, which made her the favorite on those distances at the 1972 Winter Olympics in Sapporo. During her 500 m race against Sylvia Burka at those Olympics, Henning was obstructed at the crossing by Burka, but she still set the fastest time and a new Olympic record (43.70). In her re-skate, which she was allowed to take according to the rules, she improved her time to 43.33. Aged 16, this made Henning the youngest Olympic Champion in the history of Olympic speed skating. On the 1,000 m, Henning took the bronze medal behind surprise winner Monika Pflug and only 0.01 seconds behind silver medallist Atje Keulen-Deelstra. After that season, a still only 16 year old Henning retired from speed skating. She said, “People know about speed skating, that was not part of the game when I won my medals. I wanted to go to college and see what else I could do."

Anne Henning is a retired fourth grade teacher in Aurora, Colorado. She has 3 grown children and 5 grandchildren. She is married to Erik Palmer and resides in Aurora, Colorado.

== World records ==
Over the course of her career, Henning skated four world records:

Distance	Time	Date	Location
500 m	42.91	February 20, 1971	Inzell
500 m	42.75	February 21, 1971	Inzell
500 m	42.5	January 7, 1972	Davos
1,000 m	1:27.3	January 8, 1972	Davos

== Personal records ==
To put these personal records in perspective, the last column (WR) lists the official world records on the dates that Henning skated her personal records.

Distance	Time	Date	Location	WR
500 m	42.5	January 7, 1972	Davos	42.75
1,000 m	1:27.3	January 8, 1972	Davos	1:27.7
1,500 m	2:27.30	January 16, 1972	Madonna di Campiglio	2:15,8
3,000 m	5:25.9	December 5, 1970	Innsbruck	4:50.3
