= World record progression 500 m speed skating women =

The world record progression 500 m speed skating women as recognised by the International Skating Union:

Name	Result	Date	Venue
(Poland) Zofia Nehringowa	1:02.0	15 February 1931	Warsaw
(Austria) Liselotte Landbeck	58.7	9 January 1932	Davos
(Norway) Synnøve Lie	56.0	20 March 1932	Brandbu
(Austria) Liselotte Landbeck	51.5	20 January 1933	Davos
(Austria) Liselotte Landbeck	51.3	13 January 1934	Davos
(Norway) Synnøve Lie	50.3	12 February 1934	Oslo
(Norway) Laila Schou Nilsen	49.3	27 February 1935	Oslo
(Norway) Laila Schou Nilsen	46.4	30 January 1937	Davos
(Soviet Union) Tamara Rylova	45.6	11 January 1955	Medeo
(Soviet Union) Inga Artamonova	44.9	27 January 1962	Medeo
(Soviet Union) Tatyana Sidorova	44.7	3 February 1968	Davos
(East Germany) Ruth Schleiermacher	44.6	4 February 1969	Davos
(Soviet Union) Tatyana Sidorova	43.29	9 January 1970	Medeo
(Soviet Union) Tatyana Sidorova	43.22	17 January 1970	Medeo
(United States) Anne Henning	42.91	20 February 1971	Inzell
(United States) Anne Henning	42.75	21 February 1971	Inzell
(United States) Anne Henning	42.5	7 January 1972	Davos
(United States) Sheila Young	41.8	19 January 1973	Davos
(Soviet Union) Tatyana Averina	41.70	11 March 1975	Medeo
(Soviet Union) Lyubov Sadchikova	41.69	21 March 1975	Medeo
(Soviet Union) Tatyana Averina	41.06	29 March 1975	Medeo
(United States) Sheila Young	40.91	31 January 1976	Davos
(United States) Sheila Young	40.68	13 March 1976	Inzell
(East Germany) Christa Rothenburger	40.28	27 March 1981	Medeo
(East Germany) Christa Rothenburger	40.18	28 March 1981	Medeo
(East Germany) Christa Rothenburger	39.69	25 March 1983	Medeo
(East Germany) Karin Kania	39.52	21 March 1986	Medeo
(United States) Bonnie Blair	39.43	19 March 1987	Heerenveen
(East Germany) Christa Rothenburger	39.39	6 December 1987	Calgary
(United States) Bonnie Blair	39.10	22 February 1988	Calgary
(United States) Bonnie Blair	38.99	26 March 1994	Calgary
(United States) Bonnie Blair	38.69	2 February 1995	Calgary
(Canada) Catriona Le May Doan	37.90	22 November 1997	Calgary
(Canada) Catriona Le May Doan	37.90	23 November 1997	Calgary
(Canada) Catriona Le May Doan	37.71	28 December 1997	Calgary
(Canada) Catriona Le May Doan	37.55	29 December 1997	Calgary
(Canada) Catriona Le May Doan	37.40	6 January 2001	Calgary
(Canada) Catriona Le May Doan	37.29	9 March 2001	Salt Lake City
(Canada) Catriona Le May Doan	37.29	8 December 2001	Calgary
(Canada) Catriona Le May Doan	37.22	9 December 2001	Calgary
(Germany) Jenny Wolf	37.04	10 March 2007	Salt Lake City
(Germany) Jenny Wolf	37.02	16 November 2007	Calgary
(Germany) Jenny Wolf	37.00	11 December 2009	Salt Lake City
(China) Yu Jing	36.94	29 January 2012	Calgary
(South Korea) Lee Sang-hwa	36.80	20 January 2013	Calgary
(South Korea) Lee Sang-hwa	36.74	9 November 2013	Calgary
(South Korea) Lee Sang-hwa	36.57	15 November 2013	Salt Lake City
(South Korea) Lee Sang-hwa	36.36	16 November 2013	Salt Lake City
(Netherlands) Femke Kok	36.09	16 November 2025	Salt Lake City
