= 2011–12 ISU Speed Skating World Cup =

International speed skating competition

ISU Speed Skating World Cup
- Dates: 18 November 2011 – 11 March 2012

The 2011–12 ISU Speed Skating World Cup, officially the Essent ISU World Cup Speed Skating 2011–2012, was a series of international speed skating competitions which ran the entire season. The season started on 18 November 2011 in Chelyabinsk, Russia, and ended on 11 March 2012 in Berlin, Germany. In total, seven competition weekends were held at six different locations, twelve cups were contested (six for men, and six for women), and 72 races took place.

The mass start was introduced as a new event for the season. Additionally, the team sprint was contested as a demonstration event at both Heerenveen competitions. The World Cup is organized by the International Skating Union (ISU).

== Calendar ==
WC #	City	Venue	Date	500 m	1000 m	1500 m	3000 m	5000 m	10000 m	Mass start	Team pursuit
1	Chelyabinsk	Uralskaya Molniya	18–20 November	2m, 2w	m, w	m, w	w	m			m, w
2	Astana	Alau Ice Palace	25–27 November	2m, 2w	m, w	m, w	w	m		m, w	
3	Heerenveen	Thialf	2–4 December	2m, 2w	m, w	m, w		w	m		m, w
	Budapest	City Park Ice Rink	6–8 January	2012 European Speed Skating Championships							
4	Salt Lake City	Utah Olympic Oval	21–22 January	2m, 2w	2m, 2w						
	Calgary	Olympic Oval	28–29 January	2012 World Sprint Speed Skating Championships							
5	Hamar	Vikingskipet	11–12 February			m, w	w	m			m, w
	Moscow	Krylatskoye Sport Complex	18–19 February	2012 World Allround Speed Skating Championships							
6	Heerenveen	Thialf	2–4 March	2m, 2w	m, w	m, w		w	m	m, w	
7	Berlin	Sportforum Hohenschönhausen	9–11 March	2m, 2w	m, w	m, w	w	m		m, w	m, w
	Heerenveen	Thialf	22–25 March	2012 World Single Distance Speed Skating Championships							
Total				12m, 12w	7m, 7w	6m, 6w	4w	4m, 2w	2m	3m, 3w	4m, 4w

Note: the men's 5000 and 10000 metres were contested as one cup, and the women's 3000 and 5000 metres were contested as one cup, as indicated by the color coding.

Source: ISU.

== World records ==
World records going into the 2011–12 season.

=== Men ===
Distance	Time	Nat.	Holder	Date	Venue	Reference
500 m	34.03	(Canada)	Jeremy Wotherspoon	9 November 2007	Utah Olympic Oval, Salt Lake City	
1000 m	1:06.42	(United States)	Shani Davis	7 March 2009	Utah Olympic Oval, Salt Lake City	
1500 m	1:41.04	(United States)	Shani Davis	11 December 2009	Utah Olympic Oval, Salt Lake City	
5000 m	6:03.32	(Netherlands)	Sven Kramer	17 November 2007	Olympic Oval, Calgary	
10000 m	12:41.69	(Netherlands)	Sven Kramer	10 March 2007	Utah Olympic Oval, Salt Lake City	
Team pursuit (8 laps)	3:37.80	(Netherlands)	Sven Kramer; Carl Verheijen; Erben Wennemars	11 March 2007	Utah Olympic Oval, Salt Lake City	

=== Women ===
Distance	Time	Nat.	Holder	Date	Venue	Reference
500 m	37.00	(Germany)	Jenny Wolf	11 December 2009	Utah Olympic Oval, Salt Lake City	
1000 m	1:13.11	(Canada)	Cindy Klassen	25 March 2006	Olympic Oval, Calgary	
1500 m	1:51.79	(Canada)	Cindy Klassen	20 November 2005	Utah Olympic Oval, Salt Lake City	
3000 m	3:53.34	(Canada)	Cindy Klassen	18 March 2006	Olympic Oval, Calgary	
5000 m	6:42.66	(Czech Republic)	Martina Sáblíková	18 February 2011	Utah Olympic Oval, Salt Lake City	
Team pursuit (6 laps)	2:55.79	(Canada)	Kristina Groves; Christine Nesbitt; Brittany Schussler	6 December 2009	Olympic Oval, Calgary	

== Men's standings ==
=== 500 m ===
Rank	Name	Points
1	(South Korea) Mo Tae-bum	702
2	(Finland) Pekka Koskela	674
3	(United States) Tucker Fredricks	646

=== 1000 m ===
Rank	Name	Points
1	(United States) Shani Davis	600
2	(Netherlands) Stefan Groothuis	580
3	(Netherlands) Kjeld Nuis	486

=== 1500 m ===
Rank	Name	Points
1	(Norway) Håvard Bøkko	472
2	(Netherlands) Kjeld Nuis	430
3	(United States) Shani Davis	425

=== 5000 and 10000 m ===
Rank	Name	Points
1	(Netherlands) Bob de Jong	510
2	(Netherlands) Sven Kramer	440
3	(Netherlands) Jorrit Bergsma	435

=== Mass start ===
Rank	Name	Points
1	(France) Alexis Contin	250
2	(Netherlands) Jorrit Bergsma	212
3	(United States) Jonathan Kuck	196

=== Team pursuit ===
Rank	Team	Points
1	Netherlands	374
2	South Korea	340
3	Germany	300

== Women's standings ==
=== 500 m ===
Rank	Name	Points
1	(China) Yu Jing	960
2	(South Korea) Lee Sang-hwa	890
3	(Germany) Jenny Wolf	869

=== 1000 m ===
Rank	Name	Points
1	(Canada) Christine Nesbitt	550
2	(United States) Heather Richardson	459
3	(Netherlands) Marrit Leenstra	420

=== 1500 m ===
Rank	Name	Points
1	(Canada) Christine Nesbitt	510
2	(Netherlands) Ireen Wüst	450
3	(Netherlands) Marrit Leenstra	401

=== 3000 and 5000 m ===
Rank	Name	Points
1	(Czech Republic) Martina Sáblíková	650
2	(Germany) Stephanie Beckert	410
3	(Germany) Claudia Pechstein	405

=== Mass start ===
Rank	Name	Points
1	(Netherlands) Mariska Huisman	320
2	(Germany) Claudia Pechstein	310
3	(Austria) Anna Rokita	175

=== Team pursuit ===
Rank	Team	Points
1	Canada	390
2	Russia	355
3	South Korea	320

== See also ==
- 2012 World Allround Speed Skating Championships
- 2012 World Sprint Speed Skating Championships
- 2012 World Single Distance Speed Skating Championships
