= World record progression 5000 m speed skating women =

The world record progression 5000 m speed skating women as recognised by the International Skating Union:

Name	Result	Date	Venue
(Poland) Zofia Nehringowa	11:30.5	15 February 1931	Warsaw
(Poland) Zofia Nehringowa	10:54.8	10 February 1935	Warsaw
(Finland) Verné Lesche	10:15.3	2 February 1936	Stockholm
(Norway) Laila Schou Nilsen	9:28.3	31 January 1937	Davos
(Finland) Verné Lesche	9:26.8	13 February 1949	Kongsberg
(Soviet Union) Rimma Zhukova	9:22.3	17 March 1950	Kirov
(Soviet Union) Tatyana Karelina	9:10.7	12 February 1951	Medeo
(Soviet Union) Rimma Zhukova	9:01.6	24 January 1953	Medeo
Suspended as a world record event by the ISU between 1955 and 1982.
(East Germany) Andrea Schöne	7:40.97	23 January 1983	Heerenveen
(East Germany) Gabi Schönbrunn	7:39.44	15 January 1984	Medeo
(East Germany) Andrea Schöne	7:34.52	24 March 1984	Medeo
(East Germany) Andrea Schöne	7:32.82	10 February 1985	Sarajevo
(East Germany) Andrea Ehrig	7:31.45	12 January 1986	Geithus
(East Germany) Andrea Ehrig	7:20.99	22 March 1986	Medeo
(Netherlands) Yvonne van Gennip	7:20.36	20 March 1987	Heerenveen
(Netherlands) Yvonne van Gennip	7:14.13	28 February 1988	Calgary
(Germany) Gunda Niemann	7:13.29	6 December 1993	Hamar
(Germany) Gunda Niemann	7:03.26	26 March 1994	Calgary
(Germany) Claudia Pechstein	6:59.61	20 February 1998	Nagano
(Germany) Gunda Niemann-Stirnemann	6:58.63	28 March 1998	Calgary
(Germany) Gunda Niemann-Stirnemann	6:57.24	7 February 1999	Hamar
(Germany) Gunda Niemann-Stirnemann	6:56.84	16 January 2000	Hamar
(Germany) Gunda Niemann-Stirnemann	6:55.34	25 November 2000	Heerenveen
(Germany) Gunda Niemann-Stirnemann	6:52.44	10 March 2001	Salt Lake City
(Germany) Claudia Pechstein	6:46.91	23 February 2002	Salt Lake City
(Czech Republic) Martina Sáblíková	6:45.61	11 March 2007	Salt Lake City
(Czech Republic) Martina Sáblíková	6:42.66	18 February 2011	Salt Lake City
(Czech Republic) Martina Sáblíková	6:42.01	3 March 2019	Calgary
(Russia) Natalya Voronina	6:39.02	15 February 2020	Salt Lake City
