= World record progression 1000 m speed skating women =

The 1000 m speed skating is skated over two and a half laps on a 400 m rink, and three on a 333.3 m rink. On a 400 m rink it is the only distance that uses another finish line than other distances, while on the 333.3 m rink the distance has a common start- and finish line.

== History ==
=== 1930s: Recognition ===
The history of the world record 1000 m speed skating for women starts in 1931, when the ISU (then still called IEV, Internationale Eislauf Vereinigung) decides to recognize records for women. The first official world record to be recognized was the 2:16.4 of Zofia Nehringowa from Poland, skated on 26 January 1929, in Warsaw, though at least two female Soviet skaters are known to have skated faster before 1929, Ljudmila Aleksejeva skated 1:57.6 in 1928, and later a 1:56.5 in 1930. However, because the Soviet Union was not a member of the ISU, their results could not be ratified.

The next record to be recognised by the ISU was the 2:08.8 of Austrian figure- and speed skater Liselotte Landbeck, skated on 10 January 1932, in Davos, which Zofia Nehringowa a week later in Engelberg improved to 2:03.4, still above the results of Aleksejeva. The first skater that set a world's best performance together with her official world record was the Norwegian Synnøve Lie, who skated 1:51.2 at the end of the 1931/32 season in Brandbu.

The first woman below 1:50.0 was Liselotte Landbeck, who skated a 1:48.5 on 22 January 1933 in Davos, which Synnøve Lie a year later improved on the same rink to 1:48.1. This soon proved not fast enough, as Verné Lesche from Finland set the record to 1:45.7 a month later, during the unofficial Women's World Allround Speed Skating Championships of 1934 in Oslo. At the end of the 1934/35 season that time fell to U.S. speed skater Kit Klein, who skated a 1:42.3 in Kongsberg. The next woman to improve the world record, Laila Schou Nilsen, brought the record down to 1:38.8 during the Women's World Allround Speed Skating Championships of 1937 in Davos.

=== 1950s: Slow improvement ===
The 1:38.8 proved to be a tough nut to crack, and it took till 5 February 1951 before Soviet speed skater Sofya Kondakova managed to skate 1:36.8 on the Medeo rink in Alma Ata, the Soviet Union meanwhile being a member of the ISU. In the years that followed three other Soviet skaters brought the record lower: Rimma Zhukova 1:36.6 in 1952, Lidia Selikova 1:36.4 in 1953 and Tamara Rylova 1:33.4 in 1955.

=== 1960s: Artificial ice ===
The 1960s saw a first technological breakthrough in speed skating: the 400 m artificial ice rink. The first world record 1000 m speed skating women on artificial ice was skated by Soviet speed skater Lidia Skoblikova, who skated a 1:31.8 during the Women's World Allround Speed Skating Championships of 1963 in Karuizawa. The next records would bring the 1:30.0 limit in sight, as Stien Kaiser of the Netherlands skated a 1.31.0 on the artificial ice of Inzell on 3 March 1968 and Elly van der Brom of the Netherlands skated a 1:30.0 on the natural ice of Davos on 9 February 1969.

=== 1970s: Acceleration ===
The 1970s saw a second technological breakthrough in the form of the skin suit, though that came only into general use by 1976. The 1970s saw a faster improvement than the decades before, beginning with Soviet skater Lyudmila Titova, who was the first woman below 1:30.0 with her 1:29.5 on 9 January 1970 on the Medeo rink, a record that stood only a day because Lyudmila Fechina skated 1:29.0 the next day of the same event. This result was equalled next year by Stien Kaiser on 16 January 1971 in Davos and by Lyudmila Titova during day one of the World Sprint Speed Skating Championships for Women 1971 in Inzell. A day later however Lyudmila Titova made the record her own again when she skated a 1:27.7. The last skater who set the world record on natural ice was U.S. skater Anne Henning, who managed a 1:27.3 on 8 January 1972 in Davos. Medeo by now had an artificial rink, and the next records of the 1970s would be skated here by Soviet skater Tatyana Averina: 1:26.40 in 1974, and 1:26.12, 1:25.28 and 1:23.46 in 1975.

=== 1980s: Indoor rinks ===
The 1980s saw a third technological breakthrough in the form of the indoor 400 m rink, though the first major races were not on indoor ice before 1987. The first 1000 m record of the decade, 1:23.01, was skated by Soviet skater Natalya Petrusyova on the Medeo rink at the end of the 1979/80 season. A year later Christa Rothenburger of East Germany improved that to 1:20.95, also on the Medeo rink, only to lose it a day later again to Natalya Petrusyova, when she managed a 1:20.81.

At the end of the 1982/83 season Natalya Petrusyova became the first woman to skate below 1:20.00, when she skated a 1:19.31 on the Medeo rink. The last woman to set a world record on outdoor ice was Karin Kania of East Germany, when she skated a 1:18.84 during the World Sprint Speed Skating Championships for Women of 1986 in Karuizawa. She would also be the first to skate a 1000 m world record indoor: 1:18.11 on 5 December 1987 in Calgary. During the 1988 Winter Olympics, Christa Rothenburger brought the record lower still with 1:17.65.

=== 1990s: The clap skate ===
The 1990s saw a fourth technological breakthrough, the clap skate, though that only came into general use at the end of the decade. But when it arrived, faster times became possible. Catriona Le May Doan of Canada was the first woman to skate a world record 1000 m for women on clap skates when she skated a 1:16.07 on 22 November 1997 in Calgary. U.S. skater Chris Witty would improve that twice during that season, from 1:15.43 to 1:14.96, while Monique Garbrecht of Germany skated 1:14.61 on 21 February 1999 during the World Sprint Speed Skating Championships for Women of 1999 in Calgary.

=== From 2000: Higher and faster ===
During the last decades it has become evident that world records on the 1000 m for women can only be broken on (indoor) highland rinks. The last lowland record was set in 1935, the last outdoor record in 1986. Later world records were set at altitude in Calgary, and from 2002 the even higher indoor rink of Salt Lake City came into use. Monique Garbrecht was the first to skate a world record 1000 m for women there with 1:14.13, followed by Sabine Völker from Germany with 1:14.06 and Chris Witty with 1:13.83. The role of Calgary was not over yet, the next records were for Cindy Klassen of Canada with 1:13.46 and 1:13.11 during the 24/25 March 2006 Calgary Olympic Oval final and Christine Nesbitt of Canada skated 1:12.68 during the World Sprint Speed Skating Championships for Women of 2012 in Calgary.

== The world record progression as recognised by the International Skating Union ==
Name	Result	Date	Venue	Meeting
(Poland) Zofia Nehringowa	2:16.4	26 January 1929	Warsaw	
(Austria) Liselotte Landbeck	2:08.8	10 January 1932	Davos	
(Poland) Zofia Nehringowa	2:03.4	17 January 1932	Engelberg	
(Norway) Synnøve Lie	1:51.2	20 March 1932	Brandbu	
(Austria) Liselotte Landbeck	1:48.5	22 January 1933	Davos	
(Norway) Synnøve Lie	1:48.1	14 January 1934	Davos	
(Finland) Verné Lesche	1:45.7	11 February 1934	Oslo	
(United States) Kit Klein	1:42.3	1 March 1935	Kongsberg	
(Norway) Laila Schou Nilsen	1:38.8	31 January 1937	Davos	
(Soviet Union) Sofya Kondakova	1:36.8	5 February 1951	Medeo	
(Soviet Union) Rimma Zhukova	1:36.6	22 January 1952	Medeo	
(Soviet Union) Lidia Selikhova	1:36.4	30 January 1953	Medeo	
(Soviet Union) Tamara Rylova	1:33.4	12 January 1955	Medeo	
(Soviet Union) Lidiya Skoblikova	1:31.8	22 February 1963	Karuizawa	
(Netherlands) Stien Kaiser	1:31.0	3 March 1968	Inzell	
(Netherlands) Ellie van den Brom	1:30.0	9 February 1969	Davos	
(Soviet Union) Lyudmila Titova	1:29.5	9 January 1970	Medeo	
(Soviet Union) Lyudmila Fechina	1:29.0	10 January 1970	Medeo	
(Netherlands) Stien Baas-Kaiser	1:29.0	16 January 1971	Davos	
(Soviet Union) Lyudmila Titova	1:29.0	20 February 1971	Inzell	
(Soviet Union) Lyudmila Titova	1:27.7	21 February 1971	Inzell	
(United States) Anne Henning	1:27.3	8 January 1972	Davos	
(Soviet Union) Tatyana Averina	1:26.40	2 April 1974	Medeo	
(Soviet Union) Tatyana Averina	1:26.12	12 March 1975	Medeo	
(Soviet Union) Tatyana Averina	1:25.28	22 March 1975	Medeo	
(Soviet Union) Tatyana Averina	1:23.46	29 March 1975	Medeo	
(Soviet Union) Natalya Petrusyova	1:23.01	27 March 1980	Medeo	
(East Germany) Christa Rothenburger	1:20.95	27 March 1981	Medeo	
(Soviet Union) Natalya Petrusyova	1:20.81	28 March 1981	Medeo	
(Soviet Union) Natalya Petrusyova	1:19.31	26 March 1983	Medeo	
(East Germany) Karin Kania	1:18.84	22 February 1986	Karuizawa	
(East Germany) Karin Kania	1:18.11	5 December 1987	Calgary	
(East Germany) Christa Rothenburger	1:17.65	26 February 1988	Calgary	
(Canada) Catriona Le May Doan	1:16.07	22 November 1997	Calgary	
(United States) Chris Witty	1:15.43	23 November 1997	Calgary	
(United States) Chris Witty	1:14.96	28 March 1998	Calgary	
(Germany) Monique Garbrecht	1:14.61	21 February 1999	Calgary	
(United States) Chris Witty	1:14.58	3 March 2001	Calgary	
(Germany) Monique Garbrecht-Enfeldt	1:14.13	10 March 2001	Salt Lake City	
(Germany) Sabine Völker	1:14.06	2 December 2001	Salt Lake City	
(United States) Chris Witty	1:13.83	17 February 2002	Salt Lake City	OG 2002
(Canada) Cindy Klassen	1:13.46	24 March 2006	Calgary	
(Canada) Cindy Klassen	1:13.11	25 March 2006	Calgary	
(Canada) Christine Nesbitt	1:12.68	28 January 2012	Calgary	
(United States) Brittany Bowe	1:12.58	17 November 2013	Salt Lake City	
(United States) Heather Richardson-Bergsma	1:12.51	14 November 2015	Calgary	World Cup
(United States) Brittany Bowe	1:12.18	22 November 2015	Salt Lake City	World Cup
(Japan) Nao Kodaira	1:12.09	10 December 2017	Salt Lake City	
(United States) Brittany Bowe	1:11.61	9 March 2019	Salt Lake City	
