= Mariska Huisman =

Dutch marathon skater and speed skater (born 1983)

Personal information
- Born: 23 November 1983 (age 42) Andijk, Netherlands

Sport
- Country: Netherlands
- Sport: Speed skating
Medal record
Women's speed skating
World Championships
Bronze medal – third place	2015 Heerenveen	Mass start

Mariska Huisman (born 23 November 1983) is a Dutch marathon skater and speed skater. She was the first winner of a mass start worldcup in Astana. At this moment she is the number 2 on the world ranking list.

She won the 2011–12 mass start World Cup with a total of 320 points. She did not start in the 2013 national championship mass start on 30 December 2013 due to the death of her brother Sjoerd Huisman a few hours beforehand. Sjoerd was also a marathon skater and his death was the reason the event was cancelled.

== Personal records ==
Personal records
Women's speed skating
Event	Result	Date	Location	Notes
500 m	40.79	19 March 2003	Olympic Oval, Calgary	
1000 m	1:18.96	22 March 2003	Olympic Oval, Calgary	
1500 m	2:00.65	12 October 2014	Inzell	
3000 m	4:12.64	10 November 2012	Thialf, Heerenveen	
5000 m	7:21.31	11 November 2012	Thialf, Heerenveen	
