= 2011–12 ISU Speed Skating World Cup – World Cup 1 =

The first competition weekend of the 2011–12 ISU Speed Skating World Cup was held in the Uralskaya Molniya in Chelyabinsk, Russia, from Friday, 18 November, until Sunday, 20 November 2011.

== Schedule of events ==
The schedule of the event is below:

Date	Time	Events
18 November	15:00 YEKT	500 m women 500 m men 3000 m women 1500 m men
19 November	15:00 YEKT	500 m women 500 m men 1500 m women 5000 m men
20 November	15:00 YEKT	1000 m women 1000 m men Team pursuit women Team pursuit men

== Medal summary ==
=== Men's events ===
Event	Race #	Gold	Time	Silver	Time	Bronze	Time	Report
500 m	1	Pekka Koskela; Finland	35.00	Jan Smeekens; Netherlands	35.01	Yūya Oikawa; Japan	35.07	
500 m	2	Joji Kato; Japan	34.92	Mo Tae-bum; South Korea	35.01	Yūya Oikawa; Japan	35.14	
1000 m		Stefan Groothuis; Netherlands	1:08.49	Kjeld Nuis; Netherlands	1:08.56	Denny Morrison; Canada	1:09.26	
1500 m		Stefan Groothuis; Netherlands	1:45.70	Shani Davis; United States	1:46.27	Ivan Skobrev; Russia	1:46.47	
5000 m		Jorrit Bergsma; Netherlands	6:18.74	Sven Kramer; Netherlands	6:20.60	Bob de Jong; Netherlands	6:21.96	
Team pursuit		Netherlands; Sven Kramer; Jan Blokhuijsen; Wouter olde Heuvel	3:41.25	United States; Shani Davis; Jonathan Kuck; Brian Hansen	3:44.52	Germany; Patrick Beckert; Marco Weber; Alexej Baumgartner	3:45.29	

=== Women's events ===
Event	Race #	Gold	Time	Silver	Time	Bronze	Time	Report
500 m	1	Yu Jing; China	37.81	Maki Tsuji; Japan; Thijsje Oenema; Netherlands	38.22			
500 m	2	Yu Jing; China	37.65	Lee Sang-hwa; South Korea	38.09	Jenny Wolf; Germany	38.22	
1000 m		Christine Nesbitt; Canada	1:15.97	Margot Boer; Netherlands	1:16.52	Marrit Leenstra; Netherlands	1:16.77	
1500 m		Ireen Wüst; Netherlands	1:57.02	Christine Nesbitt; Canada	1:57.44	Marrit Leenstra; Netherlands	1:58.27	
3000 m		Martina Sáblíková; Czech Republic	4:06.54	Ireen Wüst; Netherlands	4:07.16	Claudia Pechstein; Germany	4:07.81	
Team pursuit		Canada; Brittany Schussler; Cindy Klassen; Christine Nesbitt	3:02.07	Netherlands; Ireen Wüst; Diane Valkenburg; Marrit Leenstra	3:02.72	Russia; Yuliya Skokova; Yekaterina Lobysheva; Yekaterina Shikhova	3:03.37	
