= 2011–12 ISU Speed Skating World Cup – World Cup 7 =

Speed skating competition 2011-12

The seventh and final competition weekend of the 2011–12 ISU Speed Skating World Cup was held in the Sportforum Hohenschönhausen arena in Berlin, Germany, from Friday, 9 March, until Sunday, 11 March 2012.

== Schedule of events ==
The schedule of the event is below:

Date	Time	Events
9 March	14:30 CET	500 m women 500 m men 3000 m women 1500 m men
10 March	13:15 CET	500 m women 500 m men 1500 m women 5000 m men
11 March	13:30 CET	1000 m women 1000 m men Team pursuit women Team pursuit men Mass start women Mass start men

== Medal summary ==
=== Men's events ===
Event	Race #	Gold	Time	Silver	Time	Bronze	Time	Report
500 m	1	Jamie Gregg; Canada	35.06	Pekka Koskela; Finland	35.07	Mo Tae-bum; South Korea	35.17	
500 m	2	Michel Mulder; Netherlands	35.01	Mo Tae-bum; South Korea	35.04	Jan Smeekens; Netherlands	35.08	
1000 m		Shani Davis; United States	1:09.24	Kjeld Nuis; Netherlands	1:09.36	Mo Tae-bum; South Korea	1:09.37	
1500 m		Håvard Bøkko; Norway	1:47.49	Kjeld Nuis; Netherlands	1:47.69	Koen Verweij; Netherlands	1:47.727	
5000 m		Sven Kramer; Netherlands	6:14.69	Bob de Jong; Netherlands	6:17.83	Jonathan Kuck; United States	6:19.98	
Mass start		Jorrit Bergsma; Netherlands	10:39.27	Alexis Contin; France	10:43.14	Arjan Stroetinga; Netherlands	10:43.82	
Team pursuit		Netherlands; Koen Verweij; Jan Blokhuijsen; Douwe de Vries	3:43.94	South Korea; Lee Seung-hoon; Joo Hyung-joon; Ko Byung-wook	3:44.04	United States; Shani Davis; Brian Hansen; Jonathan Kuck	3:45.44	

Source: ISU

=== Women's events ===
Event	Race #	Gold	Time	Silver	Time	Bronze	Time	Report
500 m	1	Yu Jing; China	37.94	Lee Sang-hwa; South Korea	38.00	Jenny Wolf; Germany	38.37	
500 m	2	Yu Jing; China	37.63	Lee Sang-hwa; South Korea	37.66	Christine Nesbitt; Canada	38.17	
1000 m		Christine Nesbitt; Canada	1:15.04	Heather Richardson; United States	1:15.77	Zhang Hong; China	1:15.83	
1500 m		Christine Nesbitt; Canada	1:56.77	Marrit Leenstra; Netherlands	1:56.93	Martina Sáblíková; Czech Republic	1:57.36	
3000 m		Martina Sáblíková; Czech Republic	4:03.14	Stephanie Beckert; Germany	4:05.62	Claudia Pechstein; Germany	4:07.64	
Mass start		Claudia Pechstein; Germany	8:52.06	Mariska Huisman; Netherlands	8:52.32	Anna Rokita; Austria	8:52.60	
Team pursuit		Canada; Cindy Klassen; Christine Nesbitt; Brittany Schussler	3:01.03	South Korea; Kim Bo-reum; Lee Ju-yeon; Noh Seon-yeong	3:03.29	Russia; Yekaterina Lobysheva; Yekaterina Shikhova; Yuliya Skokova	3:04.51	

Source: ISU
