= 2011–12 ISU Speed Skating World Cup – World Cup 3 =

The third competition weekend of the 2011–12 ISU Speed Skating World Cup was held in the Thialf arena in Heerenveen, Netherlands, from Friday, 2 December, until Sunday, 4 December 2011.

== Schedule of events ==
The schedule of the event is below:

Date	Time	Events
2 December	16:00 CET	500 m women 500 m men 5000 m women 1500 m men
3 December	13:15 CET	500 m women 500 m men 1500 m women 10000 m men
4 December	13:00 CET	1000 m women 1000 m men Team pursuit women Team pursuit men Team sprint women^{[a1]} Team sprint men^{[a2]}

== Medal summary ==
=== Men's events ===
Event	Race #	Gold	Time	Silver	Time	Bronze	Time	Report
500 m	1	Tucker Fredricks; United States	34.98	Joji Kato; Japan	35.07	Mo Tae-bum; South Korea	35.08	
500 m	2	Pekka Koskela; Finland	35.01	Joji Kato; Japan	35.02	Jesper Hospes; Netherlands	35.06	
1000 m		Kjeld Nuis; Netherlands	1:08.64	Sjoerd de Vries; Netherlands	1:09.14	Mo Tae-bum; South Korea	1:09.18	
1500 m		Ivan Skobrev; Russia	1:45.81	Kjeld Nuis; Netherlands	1:45.99	Håvard Bøkko; Norway	1:46.49	
10000 m		Jorrit Bergsma; Netherlands	12:50.33	Bob de Jong; Netherlands	12:55.11	Bob de Vries; Netherlands	13:03.41	
Team pursuit		Netherlands; Sven Kramer; Wouter olde Heuvel; Jan Blokhuijsen	3:42.35	South Korea; Lee Seung-hoon; Ko Byung-wook; Joo Hyung-joon	3:43.82	Germany; Patrick Beckert; Alexej Baumgartner; Marco Weber	3:45.28	

=== Women's events ===
Event	Race #	Gold	Time	Silver	Time	Bronze	Time	Report
500 m	1	Yu Jing; China	37.84	Lee Sang-hwa; South Korea	37.91	Wang Beixing; China	38.17	
500 m	2	Yu Jing; China	37.67	Jenny Wolf; Germany	38.19	Laurine van Riessen; Netherlands	38.20	
1000 m		Christine Nesbitt; Canada	1:15.32	Yu Jing; China	1:15.85	Yekaterina Shikhova; Russia	1:16.16	
1500 m		Christine Nesbitt; Canada	1:55.68	Ireen Wüst; Netherlands	1:57.15	Yekaterina Shikhova; Russia	1:57.17	
5000 m		Martina Sáblíková; Czech Republic	6:58.87	Claudia Pechstein; Germany	7:02.92	Stephanie Beckert; Germany	7:04.77	
Team pursuit		Canada; Brittany Schussler; Christine Nesbitt; Cindy Klassen	3:00.01	Russia; Yekaterina Lobysheva; Yekaterina Shikhova; Yuliya Skokova	3:02.38	South Korea; Lee Ju-yeon; Noh Seon-yeong; Kim Bo-reum	3:03.18	

== Notes ==
- ^{a1} ^{a2} The team sprint events were included as demonstration events.
