= Yu Jing =

Chinese speed skater

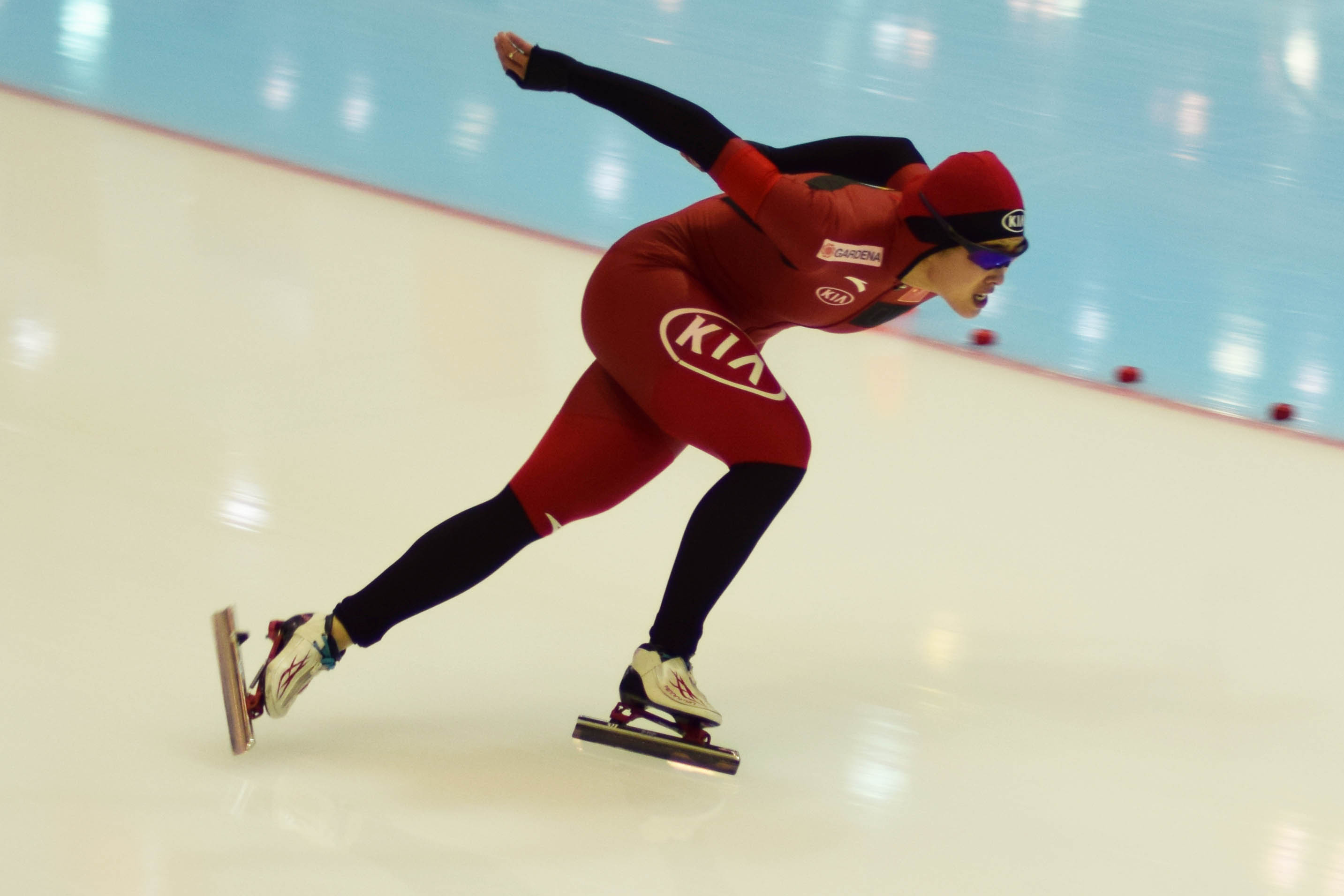

Personal information
- Born: 29 May 1985 (age 41)
- Height: 1.63 m (5 ft 4 in)
- Weight: 55 kg (121 lb)

Sport
- Country: China
- Sport: Speed skating
Medal record
World Sprint Championships
Gold medal – first place	2012 Calgary	Sprint
Gold medal – first place	2014 Nagano	Sprint
Bronze medal – third place	2009 Moscow	Sprint
World Single Distance Championships
Silver medal – second place	2012 Heerenveen	500 m
Silver medal – second place	2012 Heerenveen	1000 m
Bronze medal – third place	2017 Gangneung	500 m
Asian Winter Games
Gold medal – first place	2011 Astana	500 m
Winter Universiade
Gold medal – first place	2009 Harbin	100 m
Silver medal – second place	2009 Harbin	500 m
Silver medal – second place	2009 Harbin	1000 m
Bronze medal – third place	2007 Turin	500 m

Yu Jing
- Simplified Chinese: 于静
- Traditional Chinese: 于靜
Transcriptions
Standard Mandarin
- Hanyu Pinyin: Yú Jìng
- IPA: [y̌ tɕîŋ]

Yu Jing (Chinese: 于静; pinyin: Yú Jìng; Mandarin pronunciation: [y̌ tɕîŋ]; born 29 May 1985) is a Chinese long-track speed-skater who specializes in the sprint distances. She became the World Sprint Champion in 2012, setting world records in both the sprint combination and the 500 metres. She held the world record in the sprint combination until Heather Richardson bettered it in January 2013, and the world record in 500 metres until Lee Sang-hwa broke it in November 2013. The time, 36.94 seconds, was the Chinese record until broken by Wang Beixing in November 2013.

== Career ==
Yu Jing made her World Cup debut at the Changchun meeting in 2008, after winning a gold and a bronze at the Asian Championships the year before. Already a week later, Yu won her first World Cup victory in the 500 m at Nagano, and a second-place in the 1000 m. During the 2009 World Sprint Championships in Moscow, she managed to secure a bronze medal. The rest of the season, she raced consistently and acquired multiple podium places in the World Cup, but there were no more victories. In the World Cup total, Yu placed 5th in the 500 m and 9th in the 1000 m. At the 2009 World Single Distance Championships in Richmond, Yu missed the podium in both the 500 m and 1000 m events, finishing 4th and 12th, respectively.

Her next season at the top level was a lot less fruitful than the first. In the World Cup, she was struggling to copy the results of her first year, and at the end of the season, she was never anywhere near reaching the podium. At the 2010 World Sprint Championships in Obihiro, Yu finished 6th. Yu also represented China at the 2010 Winter Olympics in Vancouver, but finished a disappointing 32nd in the 1000 m.

In the 2010–11 season, Yu returned as a force to be reckoned with and was on the podium three times in the 500 m World Cup stops in Changchun and Obihiro in December 2010. She chose not to compete anymore in the World Cup in order to concentrate on the 2011 Asian Winter Games in Astana, starting in the end of January 2011. The gamble turned out to be successful, and on 1 February, she managed to take the gold medal in the 500 m event, beating Wang Beixing and Lee Sang-hwa.

When the World Cup circuit started again in the fall of 2011, Yu began to dominate in the 500 m. At the first meeting in Chelyabinsk, she won both of the races over that distance, each time with a winning margin over 0.4 seconds. After skipping the second meeting in Astana, she likewise went on to triumph in both 500 m races in Heerenveen and also gained a second place in the 1000 m. Obviously, she could be a major contender for the 2012 World Sprint Championships in Calgary, and perhaps the only one capable of challenging the reigning champion, Christine Nesbitt.

On the first day of the championships, Yu had technical trouble in the 500 m and finished a disappointing 7th there, as well as gaining a respectable 4th spot in the 1000 m. After the first day of racing, she was in the fifth position, 0.665 points behind Nesbitt, who had set a world record in the 1000 m and looked like the clear favorite. On the second 500 m, Yu was paired with the then-current world record holder Jenny Wolf, but raced phenomenally, and passed the finishing line setting the time 36.94, thereby snatching the world record and becoming the first woman ever to skate a 500 m in under 37 seconds. She also overtook Nesbitt as the leader of the championships, though having a slim lead of 0.57 seconds before the final 1000 m, where the two would face each other in the final pair. There, Yu started aggressively and had the lead over Nesbitt after 200 m and 600 m. As expected, Nesbitt had the better last round and went on to win this distance, but she only managed beat Yu with 0.54 seconds. Yu finished with the time 1.13.47, and cut her personal best with over a second. In the end, Yu became the world champion by only 0.02 point margin, and also set the world record in the sprint combined.

== Records ==
=== Personal records ===
Personal records
Women's speed skating
Event	Result	Date	Location	Notes
500 m	36.94	29 January 2012	Olympic Oval, Calgary	World record until broken by Lee Sang-hwa on 20 January 2013. Chinese record until broken by Wang Beixing on 15 November 2013.
1000 m	1:13.47	29 January 2012	Olympic Oval, Calgary	
Sprint comb.	148.610	28–29 January 2012	Olympic Oval, Calgary	World record until broken by Heather Richardson on 19–20 January 2013.
1500 m	2:01.47	24 September 2017	Olympic Oval, Calgary	
3000 m	4:35.09	19 October 2007	Jilin Provincial Speed Skating Rink, Changchun	
5000 m	8:12.99	7 December 2007	Jilin Provincial Speed Skating Rink, Changchun	

=== World records ===
World records
Women's speed skating
Event	Result	Date	Location	Notes
500 m	36.94	29 January 2012	Olympic Oval, Calgary	World record until broken by Lee Sang-hwa on 20 January 2013. Chinese record until broken by Wang Beixing on 15 November 2013.
Sprint comb.	148.610	28–29 January 2012	Olympic Oval, Calgary	World record until broken by Heather Richardson on 19–20 January 2013.
Team sprint	1:24.65	22 November 2015	Utah Olympic Oval, Salt Lake City	

Records
Preceded by (Germany) Jenny Wolf	Women's 500 m speed skating world record 29 January 2012 – 20 January 2013	Succeeded by (South Korea) Lee Sang-hwa
Preceded by (Canada) Cindy Klassen	Women's sprint combination speed skating world record 29 January 2012 – 20 January 2013	Succeeded by (United States) Heather Richardson
