= 2011–12 ISU Speed Skating World Cup – World Cup 6 =

The sixth competition weekend of the 2011–12 ISU Speed Skating World Cup was held in the Thialf arena in Heerenveen, Netherlands, from Friday, 2 March, until Sunday, 4 March 2012.

== Schedule of events ==
The schedule of the event is below:

Date	Time	Events
2 March	16:00 CET	500 m women 500 m men 5000 m women 1500 m men
3 March	13:15 CET	500 m women 500 m men 1500 m women 10000 m men
4 March	14:00 CET	1000 m women 1000 m men Mass start women Mass start men

== Medal summary ==
=== Men's events ===
Event	Race #	Gold	Time	Silver	Time	Bronze	Time	Report
500 m	1	Dmitry Lobkov; Russia	35.11	Hein Otterspeer; Netherlands	35.14	Keiichiro Nagashima; Japan	35.20	
500 m	2	Tucker Fredricks; United States	35.05	Michel Mulder; Netherlands	35.12	Joji Kato; Japan	35.16	
1000 m		Shani Davis; United States	1:08.88	Stefan Groothuis; Netherlands	1:09.00	Kjeld Nuis; Netherlands	1:09.05	
1500 m		Shani Davis; United States	1:46.89	Kjeld Nuis; Netherlands	1:46.98	Håvard Bøkko; Norway	1:47.21	
10000 m		Bob de Jong; Netherlands	12:58.47	Jorrit Bergsma; Netherlands	12:59.34	Håvard Bøkko; Norway	13:11.95	
Mass start		Jonathan Kuck; United States	10:09.89	Arjan Stroetinga; Netherlands	10:10.25	Alexis Contin; France	10:10.31	

=== Women's events ===
Event	Race #	Gold	Time	Silver	Time	Bronze	Time	Report
500 m	1	Yu Jing; China	38.03	Margot Boer; Netherlands	38.30	Heather Richardson; United States	38.51	
500 m	2	Jenny Wolf; Germany	37.93	Yu Jing; China	38.01	Heather Richardson; United States	38.28	
1000 m		Heather Richardson; United States	1:15.82	Ireen Wüst; Netherlands	1:16.48	Marrit Leenstra; Netherlands	1:16.54	
1500 m		Ireen Wüst; Netherlands	1:56.01	Marrit Leenstra; Netherlands	1:57.35	Diane Valkenburg; Netherlands	1:58.05	
5000 m		Martina Sáblíková; Czech Republic	6:52.50	Stephanie Beckert; Germany	6:53.36	Claudia Pechstein; Germany	7:05.37	
Mass start		Mariska Huisman; Netherlands	8:23.46	Claudia Pechstein; Germany	8:24.13	Foske Tamar van der Wal; Netherlands	8:23.47	
