= 2011–12 ISU Speed Skating World Cup – World Cup 2 =

The second competition weekend of the 2011–12 ISU Speed Skating World Cup was held in the Alau Ice Palace in Astana, Kazakhstan, from Friday, 25 November, until Sunday, 27 November 2011.

== Schedule of events ==
The schedule of the event is below:

Date	Time	Events
25 November	15:00 BTT	500 m women 500 m men 3000 m women 1500 m men
26 November	15:00 BTT	500 m women 500 m men 1500 m women 5000 m men
27 November	15:00 BTT	1000 m women 1000 m men Mass start women Mass start men

== Medal summary ==
=== Men's events ===
Event	Race #	Gold	Time	Silver	Time	Bronze	Time	Report
500 m	1	Mo Tae-bum; South Korea	34.89	Tucker Fredricks; United States	34.94	Stefan Groothuis; Netherlands	35.01	
500 m	2	Jan Smeekens; Netherlands	35.05	Mo Tae-bum; South Korea	35.06	Tucker Fredricks; United States	35.19	
1000 m		Stefan Groothuis; Netherlands	1:08.85	Kjeld Nuis; Netherlands	1:08.92	Mo Tae-bum; South Korea	1:09.29	
1500 m		Wouter olde Heuvel; Netherlands	1:45.69	Denny Morrison; Canada	1:45.80	Håvard Bøkko; Norway	1:45.97	
5000 m		Sven Kramer; Netherlands	6:13.38	Jorrit Bergsma; Netherlands	6:15.40	Alexis Contin; France	6:17.43	
Mass start		Lee Seung-hoon; South Korea	9:40.51	Jonathan Kuck; United States	9:40.67	Joo Hyong-jun; South Korea	9:40.81	

=== Women's events ===
Event	Race #	Gold	Time	Silver	Time	Bronze	Time	Report
500 m	1	Lee Sang-hwa; South Korea	37.78	Jenny Wolf; Germany	38.04	Thijsje Oenema; Netherlands	38.22	
500 m	2	Jenny Wolf; Germany	37.984	Lee Sang-hwa; South Korea	37.985	Nao Kodaira; Japan	37.99	
1000 m		Christine Nesbitt; Canada	1:14.82	Thijsje Oenema; Netherlands	1:16.120	Margot Boer; Netherlands	1:16.127	
1500 m		Christine Nesbitt; Canada	1:56.10	Claudia Pechstein; Germany	1:56.77	Ireen Wüst; Netherlands	1:57.00	
3000 m		Martina Sáblíková; Czech Republic	4:03.28	Claudia Pechstein; Germany	4:03.59	Diane Valkenburg; Netherlands	4:05.36	
Mass start		Mariska Huisman; Netherlands	7:26.53	Claudia Pechstein; Germany	7:26.61	Kim Bo-reum; South Korea	7:26.85	
