= Christine Nesbitt =

Canadian speed skater

Christine Nesbitt OLY OOnt
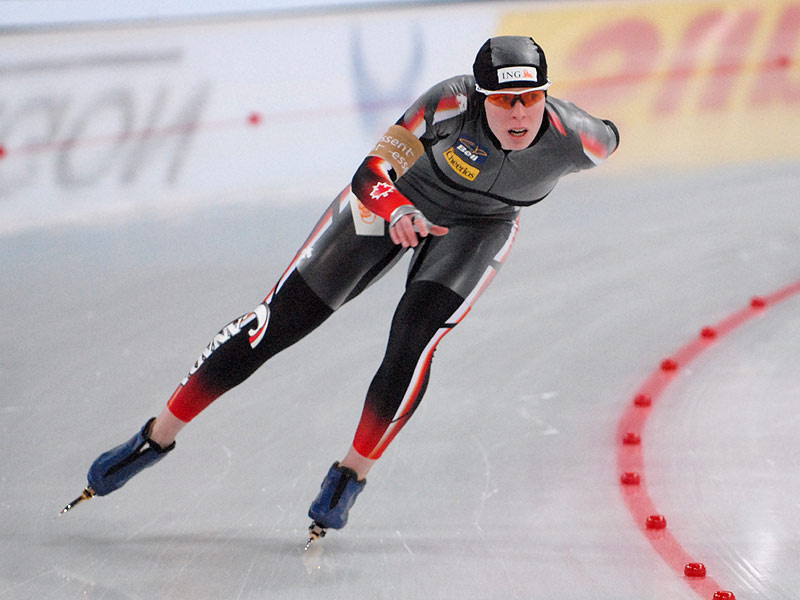

Personal information
- Born: 17 May 1985 (age 41) Melbourne, Australia
- Height: 1.71 m (5 ft 7 in)
- Weight: 68 kg (150 lb)
- Website: ChristineNesbitt.net

Sport
- Country: Canada
- Sport: Speed skating
Medal record
Women's speed skating
Representing Canada
Olympic Games
Gold medal – first place	2010 Vancouver	1000 m
Silver medal – second place	2006 Turin	Team pursuit
World Allround Championships
Silver medal – second place	2011 Calgary	Allround
Bronze medal – third place	2012 Moscow	Allround
World Sprint Championships
Gold medal – first place	2011 Heerenveen	Sprint
Silver medal – second place	2012 Calgary	Sprint
World Single Distance Championships
Gold medal – first place	2007 Salt Lake City	Team pursuit
Gold medal – first place	2009 Vancouver	1000 m
Gold medal – first place	2009 Vancouver	Team pursuit
Gold medal – first place	2011 Inzell	1000 m
Gold medal – first place	2011 Inzell	Team pursuit
Gold medal – first place	2012 Heerenveen	1000 m
Gold medal – first place	2012 Heerenveen	1500 m
Silver medal – second place	2008 Nagano	Team pursuit
Silver medal – second place	2012 Heerenveen	Team pursuit
Bronze medal – third place	2007 Salt Lake City	1000 m
Bronze medal – third place	2009 Vancouver	1500 m
Bronze medal – third place	2013 Sochi	1500 m

Christine Nesbitt (born 17 May 1985) is a Canadian retired long track speed skater who currently resides in Vancouver, British Columbia. She won the gold medal in the 1000 metres event at the Vancouver 2010 Winter Olympics. She had previously won a silver medal in the team pursuit at the 2006 Winter Olympics in Turin. She is also the 2011 sprint champion, 2012 1500 metres world champion, three-time world champion for 1000 metres (2009, 2011, 2012), and three-time world champion for team pursuit (2007, 2009, 2011). On 4 June 2015 she announced her retirement.

Nesbitt previously held the world record for 1000 metres, with a time of 1:12:68 recorded in Calgary on 28 January 2012. The time is still the current Canadian record.

== Personal life ==
Nesbitt was born to a Canadian father and an Australian mother in Melbourne, Australia. As a youth Nesbitt took an interest in track events, cross-country competitions, and ice hockey while attending Jeanne Sauvé Primary School in London, Ontario. Nesbitt played competitive hockey with the London Devilettes until switching to short track speed skating at age 12. Nesbitt continued her interests in running and speed skating while at Sir Frederick Banting Secondary School in London, where she graduated as an Ontario scholar. She entered the University of Calgary in the autumn of 2003 as an engineering student.

== Career ==
=== Early career ===
While a short track competitor Nesbitt was nationally ranked and was the top ranked short track junior in Ontario setting numerous provincial records, some of which still stand. In 1999, at age 13, she won a silver medal with the Ontario short track 3000 metres relay team in the Canada Winter Games, and also won a bronze in the same event in the 2003 Canada Winter Games.

Nesbitt took up long track speed skating in August 2003 and moved to Calgary, Alberta, to train at the University of Calgary Olympic Oval. She earned a spot on the national team in January 2005, commenced ISU World Cup competitions the same month, and competed in her first world championships, the 2005 Single Distance Championships at Inzell, Germany, finishing 17th at both the 1000 m and 1500 m distances. Nesbitt won the Canadian long track "Rising Star Award" in the spring of 2005, in part on the strength of her results in the 2005 Single Distance Championships.

Nesbitt first qualified for World Cup competitions in January 2005 and skated in her first world cup meet during the season of 2004–05 under guidance of her coach, Marcel Lacroix. The next season (2005–06), she won her first world cup medal, a bronze in the 1500 m at Salt Lake City on 20 November 2005, and later won two silver medals with the Canadian women's team pursuit. She ended the season ranked 11th in the 1500 m and 21st in the 1000 m.

Nesbitt first qualified for the Allround Championships in 2005–06, which were held in Calgary. Her overall rank was 16th at the competition, after finishing 8th in the 500 m, 10th in the 1500 m, and 22nd in the 3000 m.

=== Turin to Vancouver ===
Nesbitt clinched a spot in the 2006 Winter Olympics after winning two golds and a bronze in the 2005 Canada Post Single Distance Championships. On 15 February 2006, Nesbitt, with Cindy Klassen and Kristina Groves, set the team pursuit Olympic record, and won her first Olympic medal, a silver, in the team pursuit on the following day. In the 1000 m event, Nesbitt placed 14th with a time of 1:17.54 and placed 7th in the 1500 m with a time of 1:59.15.

During the 2006–07 World Cup season, she reached the podium 9 times, capturing five silver and two bronze medals in the 1000 m and 1500 m distances, and two silver medals in team pursuits. At the end of the season, her World Cup rankings were 4th in the 1500 m and 7th in the 1000 m.

At the 2007 Heerenveen Allround Championships, she received an overall rank of 9th, having won a bronze medal in the 1500 m, placing 6th in the 500 m, 14th in the 3000 m and 11th in the 5000 m. The 2007 Single Distance Championships, held at Kearns (Salt Lake City), Utah, brought her a gold medal in the team pursuit (with Shannon Rempel and Kristina Groves), a bronze medal in the 1000 m, and a 6th-place finish in the 1500 m race.

The 2007–08 World Cup competitions saw Nesbitt win her first gold medal in the first competition of the year, a win in the 1500 m at Salt Lake City. There she skated four distances the 500 m, 1000 m, 1500 m and 3000 m, setting personal best times at each distance. During the season she had 12 podium finishes, amassing 2 gold, 6 silver and 4 bronze World Cup medals. Although suffering an injury before the final World Cup meet, she ended the season ranked 2nd in the 1500 m and 6th in the 1000 m. The 2008 Single Distance Championships in Nagano were somewhat of a disappointment. She skated while carrying a groin injury, placing 4th in the 1000 m, 5th in the 1500 m and winning a silver medal in the team pursuit.

The 2008 Allround Championships were held in Berlin, where she finished first in the 500 m, third in the 1500 m, placed 5th in the 3000 m, and 9th in the 5000 m. Nesbitt thus completed the competition with a final rank of 4th overall among the 24 qualifiers.

=== Olympic Gold ===
The 2008–09 World Cup competitions commenced with a new coach, Ingrid Paul. Her season opened with a 1500 m competition in Berlin, in which she finished a disappointing 6th, but rebounded the next day with a gold medal in the 1000 m race. She had three 1000 m gold medal performances during fall World Cup competitions, and ended a successful racing season with 11 podium finishes including 3 gold, 4 silver and 4 bronze medals. She ranked first in 1000 m World Cup competitions, thus capturing the 1000 m World Cup title. Although she missed the Salt Lake City World Cup Finale 1500 m race due to injury, she ended the season ranked third in the 1500 m World Cup competition.

Richmond, British Columbia, hosted the 2009 World Single Distance Championships. Nesbitt competed in the 1000 m, 1500 m and team pursuit, collecting gold in the 1000 m and pursuit races, and a bronze medal in the 1500 m. Hamar, Norway, hosted the 2009 Allround Championships. Nesbitt won the 500 m and placed second in the 1500 m. She finished 13th in the 3000 m and 11th in the 5000 m, her final ranking being 6th among the 24 competitors.

Nesbitt qualified for the 2010 Winter Olympics in Vancouver. On 16 February, she finished 10th in the 500 metres. Two days later, on 18 February, she won gold in the 1000 metres.

=== Build-up to Sochi and retirement ===
The summer after the Olympics Nesbitt was involved in a car accident. Nesbitt usually commutes to and from the track by road bicycle and was t-boned by an SUV, suffering a fractured elbow and injuring a knee. Despite the injuries, she qualified with ease for the 2010–11 World Cup by winning the 1500 m at the national World Cup trials.

At the 2011 World Single Distance Championships she won gold medals in the sprint, the 1000-metre and team pursuit events. She also won the 2011 World Sprint Speed Skating Championships, the women's 1500-metre World Cup title and had a silver medal finish in the 2011 World Allround Championships. On 28 January 2012 she set a world record of 1:12.68 for the 1000 m distance at the Calgary Olympic Oval. In March 2012 she won the women's 1500-metre World Cup title and the Grand World Cup for the season's best skater.

Nesbitt was soon after diagnosed with coeliac disease, this resulted in a change of diet and lifestyle which compromised her results and saw her fail to podium thereafter leading up to and including the 2014 Winter Olympics. In the summer of 2015 Nesbitt announced her retirement from skating.

== Records ==
=== Personal records ===
Personal records
Women's speed skating
Event	Result	Date	Location	Notes
500 m	37.59	21 January 2012	Utah Olympic Oval, Salt Lake City	
1000 m	1:12.68	28 January 2012	Olympic Oval, Calgary	Current Canadian record (world record until 17 November 2013)
1500 m	1:52.75	10 November 2007	Utah Olympic Oval, Salt Lake City	
3000 m	4:03.44	12 February 2011	Olympic Oval, Calgary	
5000 m	7:07.15	13 January 2008	Olympic Oval, Calgary	
Team pursuit	2:55.79	6 December 2009	Olympic Oval, Calgary	Current world record (with Kristina Groves and Brittany Schussler)

=== World records ===
Event	Time	Date	Venue
Mini combination	153.856	11 November 2007	Utah Olympic Oval, Salt Lake City
Team pursuit	2:55.79	6 December 2009	Olympic Oval, Calgary
1000 m	1:12.68	28 January 2012	Olympic Oval, Calgary

Source: SpeedSkatingStats.com

== Awards ==
Awards
Preceded by (Netherlands) Bob de Jong	Oscar Mathisen Award; 2012	Succeeded by (Netherlands) Ireen Wüst

Award	Year
Order of Ontario	2023

== See also ==
- The traditional Adelskalender ranking is based on a skater's best time in the 500 m, 1500 m, 3k and 5k distances
- List of Canadian sports personalities
