= 2009–10 ISU Speed Skating World Cup – Women's 500 metres =

The 500 metres distance for women in the 2009–10 ISU Speed Skating World Cup was contested over 12 races on six occasions, out of a total of seven World Cup occasions for the season, with the first occasion taking place in Berlin, Germany, on 6–8 November 2009, and the final occasion taking place in Heerenveen, Netherlands, on 12–14 March 2010.

Jenny Wolf of Germany successfully defended her title, while Margot Boer of the Netherlands repeated her second place from the previous season. Wang Beixing of China came third.

On the fifth competition weekend, in Salt Lake City, Wolf set a new world record of 37.00.

== Top three ==
Medal	Athlete	Points	Previous season
Gold	(Germany) Jenny Wolf	1260	1st
Silver	(Netherlands) Margot Boer	700	2nd
Bronze	(China) Wang Beixing	680	7th

== Race medallists ==
Occasion #	Location	Date	Gold	Time	Silver	Time	Bronze	Time	Report
1	Berlin, Germany	7 November	Wang Beixing; China	37.85	Jenny Wolf; Germany	38.04	Nao Kodaira; Japan	38.19	
1	Berlin, Germany	8 November	Jenny Wolf; Germany	37.52	Wang Beixing; China	37.94	Annette Gerritsen; Netherlands	38.27	
2	Heerenveen, Netherlands	13 November	Jenny Wolf; Germany	37.92	Wang Beixing; China	38.19	Annette Gerritsen; Netherlands	38.23	
2	Heerenveen, Netherlands	14 November	Jenny Wolf; Germany	37.83	Wang Beixing; China	38.07	Annette Gerritsen; Netherlands	38.18	
4	Calgary, Canada	4 December	Jenny Wolf; Germany	37.33	Wang Beixing; China; Lee Sang-hwa; South Korea	37.34			
4	Calgary, Canada	5 December	Jenny Wolf; Germany	37.21	Wang Beixing; China	37.60	Lee Sang-hwa; South Korea	37.64	
5	Salt Lake City, United States	11 December	Jenny Wolf; Germany	37.00; WR	Wang Beixing; China	37.14	Lee Sang-hwa; South Korea	37.24	
5	Salt Lake City, United States	12 December	Wang Beixing; China	37.02	Jenny Wolf; Germany	37.17	Lee Sang-hwa; South Korea	37.24	
6	Erfurt, Germany	6 March	Jenny Wolf; Germany	38.08	Margot Boer; Netherlands	38.49	Heather Richardson; United States	38.93	
6	Erfurt, Germany	7 March	Jenny Wolf; Germany	38.10	Margot Boer; Netherlands	38.41	Thijsje Oenema; Netherlands	38.80	
7	Heerenveen, Netherlands	12 March	Jenny Wolf; Germany	38.18	Margot Boer; Netherlands	38.22	Annette Gerritsen; Netherlands	38.67	
7	Heerenveen, Netherlands	13 March	Jenny Wolf; Germany	37.96	Annette Gerritsen; Netherlands	38.32	Margot Boer; Netherlands	38.41	

== Final standings ==
Standings as of 14 March 2010 (end of the season).

#	Name	Nat.	BER1	BER2	HVN1	HVN2	CAL1	CAL2	SLC1	SLC2	ERF1	ERF2	HVN3	HVN4	Total
1	Jenny Wolf	(Germany)	80	100	100	100	100	100	100	80	100	100	150	150	1260
2	Margot Boer	(Netherlands)	50	60	45	50	60	50	–	–	80	80	120	105	700
3	Wang Beixing	(China)	100	80	80	80	80	80	80	100	–	–	–	–	680
4	Annette Gerritsen	(Netherlands)	60	70	70	70	40	45	–	–	45	–	105	120	625
5	Lee Sang-hwa	(South Korea)	45	50	60	60	80	70	70	70	–	–	–	–	505
6	Nao Kodaira	(Japan)	70	40	50	36	45	60	60	–	–	–	90	40	491
7	Sayuri Yoshii	(Japan)	12	24	40	40	24	24	40	60	40	36	18	8	366
8	Thijsje Oenema	(Netherlands)	4	6	11	19	32	32	50	24	32	70	36	45	361
9	Heather Richardson	(United States)	25	14	16	14	8	8	32	18	70	32	75	36	348
10	Laurine van Riessen	(Netherlands)	0	6	0	15	25	28	8	50	24	40	40	90	326
11	Yuliya Nemaya	(Russia)	36	36	32	45	50	36	6	40	–	–	14	21	316
12	Tomomi Okazaki	(Japan)	28	18	21	12	21	16	36	6	21	26	24	32	259
13	Elli Ochowicz	(United States)	10	16	24	18	10	10	45	32	10	45	10	24	254
14	Shihomi Shinya	(Japan)	16	10	18	24	16	6	14	45	28	18	28	16	239
15	Natasja Bruintjes	(Netherlands)	–	–	–	–	0	1	15	19	60	60	45	18	218
16	Jin Peiyu	(China)	–	25	–	32	36	12	16	–	–	–	16	75	212
17	Zhang Shuang	(China)	24	45	0	–	28	40	24	36	–	–	–	–	197
18	Xing Aihua	(China)	14	–	19	25	21	–	28	28	–	–	21	28	184
19	Christine Nesbitt	(Canada)	18	32	36	16	14	21	18	16	–	–	–	–	171
20	Yekaterina Malysheva	(Russia)	8	8	14	10	4	19	21	14	18	28	12	12	168
21	Svetlana Kaykan	(Russia)	3	4	15	11	1	0	4	25	36	21	32	10	162
22	Monique Angermüller	(Germany)	21	–	–	–	19	–	19	–	50	–	–	14	123
23	Sayuri Osuga	(Japan)	5	12	28	28	12	18	12	8	–	–	–	–	123
24	Heike Hartmann	(Germany)	19	19	12	8	6	5	5	5	6	2	8	6	101
25	Olga Fatkulina	(Russia)	0	0	0	0	11	4	25	12	16	20	–	–	88
26	Judith Hesse	(Germany)	0	1	0	2	15	11	10	21	12	14	–	–	86
27	Yu Jing	(China)	32	28	0	–	5	–	–	11	–	–	–	–	76
28	Yekaterina Lobysheva	(Russia)	–	–	–	–	0	–	–	–	25	50	–	–	75
29	Shannon Rempel	(Canada)	2	3	4	0	8	0	11	15	14	13	–	–	70
30	Ren Hui	(China)	0	–	25	21	–	14	8	–	–	–	–	–	68
31	Marianne Timmer	(Netherlands)	40	21	0	–	–	–	–	–	–	–	–	–	61
32	Sheng Xiaomei	(China)	–	15	–	6	–	25	–	10	–	–	–	–	56
33	Lauren Cholewinski	(United States)	6	8	2	8	0	0	0	8	8	11	–	–	51
34	Chiara Simionato	(Italy)	1	0	8	1	0	6	0	1	15	18	–	–	50
35	Yekaterina Shikhova	(Russia)	15	–	–	–	–	–	–	–	19	–	–	–	34
36	Rebekah Bradford	(United States)	0	0	0	0	0	0	6	0	11	16	–	–	33
37	Lee Bo-ra	(South Korea)	6	5	6	4	0	8	0	0	–	–	–	–	29
38	Tamara Oudenaarden	(Canada)	8	4	0	0	0	0	0	0	2	10	–	–	24
39	Anastasia Bucsis	(Canada)	0	0	0	0	0	0	0	0	6	12	–	–	18
40	Ko Hyon-Suk	(North Korea)	–	–	–	–	2	15	–	–	–	–	–	–	17
41	An Jee-min	(South Korea)	11	2	0	0	0	2	1	0	–	–	–	–	16
42	Gabriele Hirschbichler	(Germany)	0	–	–	–	0	0	–	–	4	9	–	–	13
43	Yekaterina Aydova	(Kazakhstan)	0	11	0	0	0	0	0	0	–	–	–	–	11
44	Jennifer Rodriguez	(United States)	2	–	1	–	6	–	2	–	–	–	–	–	11
45	Sophie Muir	(Australia)	0	0	0	0	0	0	0	2	8	–	–	–	10
46	Katarzyna Bachleda-Curuś	(Poland)	–	–	0	–	0	–	0	–	0	7	–	–	7
47	Oh Min-jee	(South Korea)	0	0	0	0	0	0	0	6	–	–	–	–	6
47	Denise Roth	(Germany)	–	–	–	–	–	–	–	–	–	6	–	–	6
49	Anna Ringsred	(United States)	–	–	–	–	–	–	–	–	0	5	–	–	5
50	Daniela Dumitru	(Romania)	–	–	–	–	0	0	0	0	1	4	–	–	5
51	Svetlana Radkevich	(Belarus)	0	0	0	0	0	0	0	4	–	–	–	–	4
51	Paulina Wallin	(Sweden)	4	0	0	0	–	–	0	0	–	–	–	–	4
