= 2009–10 ISU Speed Skating World Cup – Women's 1500 metres =

The 1500 metres distance for women in the 2009–10 ISU Speed Skating World Cup was contested over six races on six occasions, out of a total of seven World Cup occasions for the season, with the first occasion taking place in Berlin, Germany, on 6–8 November 2009, and the final occasion taking place in Heerenveen, Netherlands, on 12–14 March 2010.

Kristina Groves of Canada successfully defended her title from the previous season, while fellow Canadian Christine Nesbitt came second, and Martina Sáblíková of the Czech Republic came third.

== Top three ==
Medal	Athlete	Points	Previous season
Gold	(Canada) Kristina Groves	560	1st
Silver	(Canada) Christine Nesbitt	374	3rd
Bronze	(Czech Republic) Martina Sáblíková	348	16th

== Race medallists ==
Occasion #	Location	Date	Gold	Time	Silver	Time	Bronze	Time	Report
1	Berlin, Germany	8 November	Christine Nesbitt; Canada	1:55.54	Martina Sáblíková; Czech Republic	1:56.99	Brittany Schussler; Canada	1:57.26	
2	Heerenveen, Netherlands	14 November	Ireen Wüst; Netherlands	1:56.69	Christine Nesbitt; Canada	1:56.74	Kristina Groves; Canada	1:57.05	
3	Hamar, Norway	22 November	Kristina Groves; Canada	1:55.16	Ireen Wüst; Netherlands	1:55.95	Martina Sáblíková; Czech Republic	1:56.34	
4	Calgary, Canada	5 December	Kristina Groves; Canada	1:54.35	Christine Nesbitt; Canada	1:54.43	Elma de Vries; Netherlands	1:54.55	
5	Salt Lake City, United States	12 December	Christine Nesbitt; Canada	1:52.76	Kristina Groves; Canada	1:53.32	Jennifer Rodriguez; United States	1:54.19	
7	Heerenveen, Netherlands	13 March	Kristina Groves; Canada	1:58.15	Martina Sáblíková; Czech Republic	1:58.27	Brittany Schussler; Canada	1:58.60	

== Final standings ==
Standings as of 14 March 2010 (end of the season).

#	Name	Nat.	BER	HVN1	HAM	CAL	SLC	HVN2	Total
1	Kristina Groves	(Canada)	60	70	100	100	80	150	560
2	Christine Nesbitt	(Canada)	100	80	–	80	100	14	374
3	Martina Sáblíková	(Czech Republic)	80	10	70	32	36	120	348
4	Brittany Schussler	(Canada)	70	21	–	60	40	105	296
5	Daniela Anschütz-Thoms	(Germany)	36	60	60	28	–	75	259
6	Ireen Wüst	(Netherlands)	24	100	80	21	32	–	257
7	Diane Valkenburg	(Netherlands)	45	45	40	12	–	90	232
8	Katarzyna Bachleda-Curuś	(Poland)	21	28	45	50	28	36	208
9	Jennifer Rodriguez	(United States)	25	32	–	45	70	18	190
10	Yekaterina Shikhova	(Russia)	18	40	–	36	45	45	184
11	Anni Friesinger-Postma	(Germany)	40	50	–	45	–	32	167
12	Maki Tabata	(Japan)	16	16	28	18	60	21	159
13	Margot Boer	(Netherlands)	50	36	14	–	–	40	140
14	Elma de Vries	(Netherlands)	–	–	25	70	14	5	114
15	Cindy Klassen	(Canada)	32	24	–	24	18	16	114
16	Alla Shabanova	(Russia)	4	25	50	6	8	8	101
17	Nao Kodaira	(Japan)	28	12	–	15	21	12	88
18	Annette Gerritsen	(Netherlands)	6	19	36	–	–	24	85
19	Monique Angermüller	(Germany)	10	–	–	19	50	–	79
20	Masako Hozumi	(Japan)	15	8	18	8	24	6	79
21	Laurine van Riessen	(Netherlands)	–	–	–	14	25	28	67
22	Karolína Erbanová	(Czech Republic)	2	6	24	25	5	–	62
23	Wang Fei	(China)	8	15	32	0	–	–	55
24	Jilleanne Rookard	(United States)	0	8	21	4	12	10	55
25	Noh Seon-yeong	(South Korea)	19	18	–	–	16	–	53
26	Shannon Rempel	(Canada)	–	–	–	16	19	–	35
27	Dong Feifei	(China)	4	4	16	0	10	–	34
28	Lee Ju-yeon	(South Korea)	14	14	–	6	–	–	34
29	Catherine Raney	(United States)	–	–	19	5	6	–	30
30	Hege Bøkko	(Norway)	12	6	–	2	2	–	22
31	Natasja Bruintjes	(Netherlands)	8	11	–	–	–	–	19
31	Yekaterina Lobysheva	(Russia)	–	–	–	8	11	–	19
31	Luiza Złotkowska	(Poland)	0	–	8	11	–	–	19
34	Galina Likhachova	(Russia)	11	5	–	0	–	–	16
35	Paulien van Deutekom	(Netherlands)	–	–	–	–	15	–	15
35	Olga Graf	(Russia)	–	–	15	–	–	–	15
37	Justine L'Heureux	(Canada)	1	0	12	–	–	–	13
38	Katrin Mattscherodt	(Germany)	5	0	8	0	–	–	13
39	Ida Njåtun	(Norway)	–	–	11	0	–	–	11
40	Nancy Swider-Peltz, Jr	(United States)	0	1	10	0	0	–	11
41	Marrit Leenstra	(Netherlands)	–	–	–	10	0	–	10
42	Isabell Ost	(Germany)	2	2	–	0	6	–	10
43	Fu Chunyan	(China)	3	0	6	0	–	–	9
44	Maren Haugli	(Norway)	0	0	–	–	8	–	8
45	Stephanie Beckert	(Germany)	–	0	6	–	0	–	6
45	Eriko Ishino	(Japan)	6	0	–	0	0	–	6
47	Ji Jia	(China)	1	0	5	0	0	–	6
48	Natalia Czerwonka	(Poland)	0	0	–	0	4	–	4
48	Katarzyna Woźniak	(Poland)	–	0	4	–	0	–	4
50	Shiho Ishizawa	(Japan)	–	–	2	–	–	–	2
51	Yekaterina Abramova	(Russia)	–	–	–	1	–	–	1
51	Nicole Garrido	(Canada)	–	–	1	–	–	–	1
51	Anna Rokita	(Austria)	0	0	0	0	1	–	1
