= 2009–10 ISU Speed Skating World Cup – Women's 1000 metres =

The 1000 metres distance for women in the 2009–10 ISU Speed Skating World Cup was contested over seven races on six occasions, out of a total of seven World Cup occasions for the season, with the first occasion taking place in Berlin, Germany, on 6–8 November 2009, and the final occasion taking place in Heerenveen, Netherlands, on 12–14 March 2010.

Christine Nesbitt of Canada defended her title from the previous season, while Margot Boer of the Netherlands came second, and Monique Angermüller of Germany came third.

== Top three ==
Medal	Athlete	Points	Previous season
Gold	(Canada) Christine Nesbitt	646	1st
Silver	(Netherlands) Margot Boer	507	5th
Bronze	(Germany) Monique Angermüller	468	6th

== Race medallists ==
Occasion #	Location	Date	Gold	Time	Silver	Time	Bronze	Time	Report
1	Berlin, Germany	7 November	Christine Nesbitt; Canada	1:15.41	Nao Kodaira; Japan	1:15.92	Marianne Timmer; Netherlands	1:16.13	
2	Heerenveen, Netherlands	15 November	Christine Nesbitt; Canada	1:15.47	Annette Gerritsen; Netherlands	1:16.03	Natasja Bruintjes; Netherlands	1:16.08	
4	Calgary, Canada	6 December	Christine Nesbitt; Canada	1:14.03	Annette Gerritsen; Netherlands	1:14.48	Monique Angermüller; Germany	1:14.68	
5	Salt Lake City, United States	13 December	Christine Nesbitt; Canada	1:13.36	Wang Beixing; China	1:14.01	Nao Kodaira; Japan	1:14.17	
6	Erfurt, Germany	6 March	Monique Angermüller; Germany	1:16.36	Margot Boer; Netherlands	1:16.48	Natasja Bruintjes; Netherlands	1:16.59	
6	Erfurt, Germany	7 March	Yekaterina Shikhova; Russia	1:16.93	Laurine van Riessen; Netherlands	1:17.18	Natasja Bruintjes; Netherlands	1:17.29	
7	Heerenveen, Netherlands	14 March	Yekaterina Shikhova; Russia	1:16.25	Annette Gerritsen; Netherlands	1:16.35	Natasja Bruintjes; Netherlands	1:16.60	

== Final standings ==
Standings as of 14 March 2010 (end of the season).

#	Name	Nat.	BER	HVN1	CAL	SLC	ERF1	ERF2	HVN2	Total
1	Christine Nesbitt	(Canada)	100	100	100	100	–	32	40	472
2	Margot Boer	(Netherlands)	60	60	45	–	80	60	90	395
3	Monique Angermüller	(Germany)	40	–	70	60	100	45	36	351
4	Natasja Bruintjes	(Netherlands)	–	70	10	21	70	70	105	346
5	Annette Gerritsen	(Netherlands)	45	80	80	–	–	–	120	325
6	Yekaterina Shikhova	(Russia)	12	–	–	25	36	100	150	323
7	Laurine van Riessen	(Netherlands)	2	25	36	50	50	80	75	318
8	Nao Kodaira	(Japan)	80	24	28	70	–	–	28	230
9	Heather Richardson	(United States)	36	21	21	32	45	40	32	227
10	Sayuri Yoshii	(Japan)	28	16	50	36	28	36	18	212
11	Jennifer Rodriguez	(United States)	24	18	40	28	32	0	45	187
12	Wang Beixing	(China)	32	36	32	80	–	–	–	180
13	Kristina Groves	(Canada)	16	45	60	40	–	–	–	161
14	Olga Fatkulina	(Russia)	0	8	25	45	21	22	10	131
15	Yekaterina Malysheva	(Russia)	11	10	19	14	60	–	–	114
16	Yekaterina Lobysheva	(Russia)	5	–	0	19	40	50		114
17	Katarzyna Bachleda-Curuś	(Poland)	2	19	14	10	24	20	24	113
18	Elli Ochowicz	(United States)	15	28	24	18	–	–	16	101
19	Ireen Wüst	(Netherlands)	25	50	12	–	–	–	12	99
20	Shannon Rempel	(Canada)	4	11	11	5	18	24	14	87
21	Anni Friesinger-Postma	(Germany)	14	40	–	24	–	–	–	78
22	Rebekah Bradford	(United States)	0	0	0	0	28	25	21	74
23	Brittany Schussler	(Canada)	50	14	8	–	–	–	–	72
24	Marianne Timmer	(Netherlands)	70	–	–	–	–	–	–	70
25	Lee Sang-hwa	(South Korea)	18	12	18	12	–	–	–	60
26	Chiara Simionato	(Italy)	0	1	8	6	16	26	–	57
27	Jin Peiyu	(China)	–	32	16	8	–	–	–	56
28	Tomomi Okazaki	(Japan)	10	5	0	0	12	18	–	45
29	Ren Hui	(China)	6	6	15	16	–	–	–	43
30	Sophie Nijman	(Netherlands)	–	–	–	–	16	19	–	35
31	Cindy Klassen	(Canada)	19	8	–	6	–	–	–	33
32	Maki Tabata	(Japan)	8	6	4	15	–	–	–	33
33	Yu Jing	(China)	21	–	–	11	–	–	–	32
34	Svetlana Kaykan	(Russia)	–	–	–	–	13	15	–	28
35	Gabriele Hirschbichler	(Germany)	1	0	0	–	14	11	–	26
36	Anastasia Bucsis	(Canada)	–	–	–	–	14	8	–	22
37	Hege Bøkko	(Norway)	0	15	6	0	–	–	–	21
38	Kelly Gunther	(United States)	–	–	–	0	9	11	–	20
39	Shihomi Shinya	(China)	0	0	0	8	10	–	–	18
40	Tamara Oudenaarden	(Canada)	–	–	–	–	12	4	–	16
41	Daniela Dumitru	(Romania)	0	0	0	0	8	6	–	14
42	Anna Ringsred	(United States)	–	–	–	–	–	10	–	10
43	Heike Hartmann	(Germany)	6	4	0	0	0	–	–	10
44	Denise Roth	(Germany)	–	–	–	–	7	2	–	9
45	Karolína Erbanová	(Czech Republic)	4	0	1	4	–	–	–	9
46	Wang Fei	(China)	8	–	–	–	–	–	–	8
47	Yekaterina Aydova	(Kazakhstan)	0	0	6	0	–	–	–	6
48	Kim Yoo-rim	(South Korea)	0	2	2	0	–	–	–	4
49	Pamela Zoellner	(Germany)	3	0	0	–	–	–	–	3
50	Daniela Anschütz-Thoms	(Germany)	–	–	–	2	–	–	–	2
51	Yuliya Nemaya	(Russia)	1	0	–	–	–	–	–	1
51	Xing Aihua	(China)	–	–	0	1	–	–	–	1
