= 2009–10 ISU Speed Skating World Cup – Men's 1000 metres =

The 1000 metres distance for men in the 2009–10 ISU Speed Skating World Cup was contested over seven races on six occasions, out of a total of seven World Cup occasions for the season, with the first occasion taking place in Berlin, Germany, on 6–8 November 2009, and the final occasion taking place in Heerenveen, Netherlands, on 12–14 March 2010.

Shani Davis of the United States successfully defended his title from the previous season by winning all races, while Mark Tuitert of the Netherlands came second, and Stefan Groothuis, also of the Netherlands, repeated his third place from the previous season.

== Top three ==
Medal	Athlete	Points	Previous season
Gold	(United States) Shani Davis	750	1st
Silver	(Netherlands) Mark Tuitert	425	7th
Bronze	(Netherlands) Stefan Groothuis	355	3rd

== Race medallists ==
Occasion #	Location	Date	Gold	Time	Silver	Time	Bronze	Time	Report
1	Berlin, Germany	6 November	Shani Davis; United States	1:08.53	Yevgeny Lalenkov; Russia	1:09.11	Mun Jun; South Korea	1:09.43	
2	Heerenveen, Netherlands	15 November	Shani Davis; United States	1:08.48	Simon Kuipers; Netherlands	1:09.06	Mo Tae-bum; South Korea	1:09.11	
4	Calgary, Canada	6 December	Shani Davis; United States	1:06.91	Lee Kyou-hyuk; South Korea	1:07.61	Denny Morrison; Canada	1:07.77	
5	Salt Lake City, United States	13 December	Shani Davis; United States	1:06.67	Lee Kyou-hyuk; South Korea	1:07.07	Mika Poutala; Finland	1:07.24	
6	Erfurt, Germany	6 March	Shani Davis; United States	1:09.29	Mark Tuitert; Netherlands	1:09.43	Stefan Groothuis; Netherlands	1:09.48	
6	Erfurt, Germany	7 March	Shani Davis; United States	1:09.25	Stefan Groothuis; Netherlands	1:09.50	Mark Tuitert; Netherlands	1:09.64	
7	Heerenveen, Netherlands	14 March	Shani Davis; United States	1:08.89	Stefan Groothuis; Netherlands	1:09.07	Mark Tuitert; Netherlands	1:09.13	

== Final standings ==
Standings as of 14 March 2010 (end of the season).

#	Name	Nat.	BER	HVN1	CAL	SLC	ERF1	ERF2	HVN2	Total
1	Shani Davis	(United States)	100	100	100	100	100	100	150	750
2	Mark Tuitert	(Netherlands)	60	60	50	–	80	70	105	425
3	Stefan Groothuis	(Netherlands)	0	25	60	–	70	80	120	355
4	Simon Kuipers	(Netherlands)	–	80	36	–	60	40	90	306
5	Denny Morrison	(Canada)	45	21	70	21	40	50	45	292
6	Yevgeny Lalenkov	(Russia)	80	10	–	–	45	60	75	270
7	Mika Poutala	(Finland)	28	32	32	70	10	21	32	225
8	Lars Elgersma	(Netherlands)	21	40	–	36	50	45	24	216
9	Mo Tae-bum	(South Korea)	40	70	45	60	–	–	–	215
10	Lee Kyou-hyuk	(South Korea)	24	28	80	80	–	–	–	212
11	Chad Hedrick	(United States)	50	36	21	50	–	–	–	157
12	Mun Jun	(South Korea)	70	45	28	–	–	–	–	143
13	Trevor Marsicano	(United States)	14	18	40	18	–	–	40	130
14	Samuel Schwarz	(Germany)	15	14	12	–	28	32	28	129
15	Jan Bos	(Netherlands)	36	60	16	12	–	–	–	124
16	Dmitry Lobkov	(Russia)	16	6	5	6	18	28	36	115
17	Jamie Gregg	(Canada)	–	19	24	32	16	16	8	115
18	Mikael Flygind-Larsen	(Norway)	6	15	10	8	32	36	–	107
19	Jeremy Wotherspoon	(Canada)	–	–	19	45	36	–	–	100
20	Nico Ihle	(Germany)	12	5	8	40	12	10	12	99
21	Kyle Parrott	(Canada)	–	24	18	24	14	0	10	90
22	Aleksey Yesin	(Russia)	4	–	0	6	24	24	16	74
23	Nick Pearson	(United States)	18	12	14	28	–	–	–	72
24	Matteo Anesi	(Italy)	–	–	–	19	21	18	14	72
25	Frank Steiner	(Germany)	0	6	0	–	11	25	21	63
26	Christoffer Fagerli Rukke	(Norway)	19	8	6	5	6	14	–	58
27	Håvard Bøkko	(Norway)	25	16	–	16	–	–	–	57
28	Rhian Ket	(Netherlands)	–	–	–	–	12	25	18	55
29	Beorn Nijenhuis	(Netherlands)	32	–	–	14	–	–	–	46
30	Maciej Ustynowicz	(Poland)	0	11	0	25	0	6	–	42
31	Keiichiro Nagashima	(Japan)	4	8	15	10	–	–	–	37
32	Joey Lindsey	(United States)	–	–	–	–	15	15	–	30
33	Ryohei Haga	(Japan)	8	0	6	–	8	8	–	30
34	Aleksandr Lebedev	(Russia)	8	4	0	15	–	–	–	27
35	Remco olde Heuvel	(Netherlands)	–	–	25	–	–	–	–	25
36	Denis Kuzin	(Kazakhstan)	2	–	–	0	19	–	–	21
37	Ermanno Ioriatti	(Italy)	0	–	0	–	–	19	–	19
38	Even Johansen	(Norway)	–	–	–	–	4	11	–	15
39	Lee Jong-woo	(South Korea)	11	–	2	0	–	–	–	13
40	Konrad Niedźwiedzki	(Poland)	1	–	11	–	–	–	–	12
41	Maciej Biega	(Poland)	–	–	–	0	8	4	–	12
42	Ronald Mulder	(Netherlands)	–	–	–	11	–	–	–	11
43	François-Olivier Roberge	(Canada)	6	1	4	0	–	–	–	11
44	Richard MacClennan	(Canada)	10	0	–	–	–	–	–	10
45	Takaharu Nakajima	(Japan)	0	2	8	–	–	–	–	10
46	Lee Ki-ho	(South Korea)	–	0	–	8	–	–	–	8
46	Aleksandr Zhigin	(Kazakhstan)	–	–	–	–	–	8	–	8
48	Mike Blumel	(United States)	–	–	–	0	2	6	–	8
49	Espen-Aarnes Hvammen	(Norway)	–	–	–	–	6	0	–	6
50	Jan Friesinger	(Germany)	5	0	0	–	–	–	–	5
51	Kjeld Nuis	(Netherlands)	–	–	–	4	–	–	–	4
52	Teruhiro Sugimori	(Japan)	3	0	0	1	–	–	–	4
53	Eric Rauschenbach	(Germany)	0	0	–	–	1	2	–	3
54	Haralds Silovs	(Latvia)	–	–	0	2	–	–	–	2
55	James-Clay Cholewinski	(United States)	–	–	–	–	0	2	–	2
55	Jörg Dallmann	(Germany)	–	–	1	–	0	–	–	1
