= 2009–10 ISU Speed Skating World Cup – Men's 500 metres =

The 500 metres distance for men in the 2009–10 ISU Speed Skating World Cup was contested over 12 races on six occasions, out of a total of seven World Cup occasions for the season, with the first occasion taking place in Berlin, Germany, on 6–8 November 2009, and the final occasion taking place in Heerenveen, Netherlands, on 12–14 March 2010.

Tucker Fredricks of the United States won the cup, while Jan Smeekens of the Netherlands came second, and Mika Poutala of Finland came third. Defending champion Yu Fengtong of China finished in 20th place.

== Top three ==
Medal	Athlete	Points	Previous season
Gold	(United States) Tucker Fredricks	788	3rd
Silver	(Netherlands) Jan Smeekens	742	11th
Bronze	(Finland) Mika Poutala	702	4th

== Race medallists ==
Occasion #	Location	Date	Gold	Time	Silver	Time	Bronze	Time	Report
1	Berlin, Germany	6 November	Lee Kang-seok; South Korea	34.80	Lee Kyou-hyuk; South Korea	35.02	Keiichiro Nagashima; Japan	35.13	
1	Berlin, Germany	8 November	Tucker Fredricks; United States	35.06	Lee Kang-seok; South Korea	35.10	Lee Kyou-hyuk; South Korea	35.10	
2	Heerenveen, Netherlands	13 November	Keiichiro Nagashima; Japan	34.98	Tucker Fredricks; United States	35.00	Ronald Mulder; Netherlands	35.07	
2	Heerenveen, Netherlands	14 November	Joji Kato; Japan	34.98	Jan Smeekens; Netherlands	35.02	Lee Kang-seok; South Korea	35.13	
4	Calgary, Canada	4 December	Mika Poutala; Finland	34.38	Joji Kato; Japan	34.45	Jamie Gregg; Canada	34.45	
4	Calgary, Canada	5 December	Lee Kyou-hyuk; South Korea	34.28	Mika Poutala; Finland	34.38	Tucker Fredricks; United States	34.50	
5	Salt Lake City, United States	11 December	Lee Kyou-hyuk; South Korea	34.26	Yuya Oikawa; Japan	34.27	Mika Poutala; Finland	34.31	
5	Salt Lake City, United States	12 December	Lee Kyou-hyuk; South Korea	34.26	Lee Kang-seok; South Korea	34.28	Tucker Fredricks; United States	34.35	
6	Erfurt, Germany	6 March	Jan Smeekens; Netherlands	34.97	Yuya Oikawa; Japan	35.10	Ronald Mulder; Netherlands	35.25	
6	Erfurt, Germany	7 March	Jan Smeekens; Netherlands	35.20	Yuya Oikawa; Japan	35.21	Mika Poutala; Finland; Dmitry Lobkov; Russia	35.22	
7	Heerenveen, Netherlands	12 March	Jan Smeekens; Netherlands	34.99	Tucker Fredricks; United States	35.01	Ronald Mulder; Netherlands	35.24	
7	Heerenveen, Netherlands	13 March	Jan Smeekens; Netherlands	35.05	Ronald Mulder; Netherlands	35.19	Akio Ohta; Japan	35.35	

== Final standings ==
Standings as of 14 March 2010 (end of the season).

#	Name	Nat.	BER1	BER2	HVN1	HVN2	CAL1	CAL2	SLC1	SLC2	ERF1	ERF2	HVN3	HVN4	Total
1	Tucker Fredricks	(United States)	16	100	80	50	32	70	50	70	60	50	120	90	788
2	Jan Smeekens	(Netherlands)	36	28	50	80	16	32	–	–	100	100	150	150	742
3	Mika Poutala	(Finland)	60	50	45	60	100	80	70	36	50	70	36	45	702
4	Yuya Oikawa	(Japan)	21	14	36	32	60	40	80	45	80	80	24	75	587
5	Ronald Mulder	(Netherlands)	18	24	70	45	45	36	–	28	70	6	105	120	567
6	Lee Kang-seok	(South Korea)	100	80	60	70	28	45	60	80	–	–	–	–	523
7	Lee Kyou-hyuk	(South Korea)	80	70	–	21	50	100	100	100	–	–	–	–	521
8	Keiichiro Nagashima	(Japan)	70	45	100	36	40	21	45	50	–	–	–	–	407
9	Joji Kato	(Japan)	45	18	10	100	80	60	36	24	–	–	–	–	373
10	Akio Ota	(Japan)	11	25	24	14	10	10	28	16	36	45	45	105	369
11	Ryohei Haga	(Japan)	40	60	18	5	24	14	12	12	45	32	75	24	361
12	Jamie Gregg	(Canada)	–	–	12	40	70	–	32	60	32	24	40	32	342
13	Dmitry Lobkov	(Russia)	6	12	0	15	4	19	25	4	40	70	90	36	321
14	Mun Jun	(South Korea)	25	45	40	18	36	24	6	–	–	–	–	–	194
15	Zhang Zhongqi	(China)	32	36	32	28	8	28	14	14	–	–	–	–	192
16	Mo Tae-bum	(South Korea)	10	6	4	19	21	50	40	32	–	–	–	–	182
17	Kyle Parrott	(Canada)	–	–	19	25	18	12	24	18	14	14	16	16	176
18	Maciej Ustynowicz	(Poland)	19	6	2	11	11	4	19	25	10	12	32	14	165
19	Nico Ihle	(Germany)	6	8	0	6	2	6	11	15	21	21	28	40	164
20	Yu Fengtong	(China)	12	21	16	16	19	11	18	40	–	–	–	–	153
21	Shani Davis	(United States)	15	19	28	24	14	16	21	10	5	–	–	–	152
22	Pekka Koskela	(Finland)	50	16	8	6	12	0	–	–	–	–	14	18	124
23	Stefan Groothuis	(Netherlands)	24	10	21	8	0	0	–	–	16	36	–	–	115
24	Samuel Schwarz	(Germany)	4	0	1	0	0	0	–	0	25	18	21	28	97
25	Mike Ireland	(Canada)	–	–	8	8	25	18	16	21	–	–	–	–	96
26	Lee Ki-ho	(South Korea)	14	32	14	12	0	0	10	6	–	–	–	–	88
27	Simon Kuipers	(Netherlands)	2	–	–	–	6	8	–	–	28	40	–	–	84
28	Espen-Aarnes Hvammen	(Norway)	–	–	–	–	–	–	–	–	19	25	18	21	83
29	Vincent Labrie	(Canada)	5	0	0	0	15	15	15	19	6	8	–	–	83
30	Ermanno Ioriatti	(Italy)	–	–	11	1	8	0	6	11	12	28	–	–	77
31	Liu Fangyi	(China)	8	1	10	25	6	8	8	8	–	–	–	–	74
32	Brent Aussprung	(United States)	28	5	6	4	–	–	0	0	8	10	–	–	61
33	Jeremy Wotherspoon	(Canada)	–	–	–	–	–	25	–	5	24	–	–	–	54
34	Mark Tuitert	(Netherlands)	8	8	0	0	–	–	–	–	18	16	–	–	50
35	Wang Nan	(China)	2	15	6	0	0	0	8	8	–	–	–	–	39
36	Markus Puolakka	(Finland)	0	0	0	0	0	0	1	6	8	19	–	–	34
37	Roman Krech	(Kazakhstan)	0	0	0	–	0	–	0	–	11	15	–	–	26
38	Tuomas Nieminen	(Finland)	0	0	0	0	0	0	4	4	6	11	–	–	25
39	Michel Mulder	(Netherlands)	–	4	15	4	–	–	–	–	–	–	–	–	23
40	Yevgeny Lalenkov	(Russia)	–	–	–	–	0	–	0	–	15	–	–	–	15
41	Nick Pearson	(United States)	0	11	0	0	0	0	0	2	–	–	–	–	13
42	Muncef Ouardi	(Canada)	3	4	0	0	0	2	2	–	–	–	–	–	11
43	Frank Steiner	(Germany)	0	–	0	0	0	–	–	–	0	8	–	–	8
44	Zhang Yaolin	(China)	4	–	0	2	0	0	0	1	–	–	–	–	7
45	Joey Lindsey	(United States)	–	–	–	–	–	–	–	–	–	6	–	–	6
46	Denny Morrison	(Canada)	1	–	–	–	–	–	–	–	4	0	–	–	5
47	Maciej Biega	(Poland)	0	0	0	0	0	0	0	0	0	4	–	–	4
48	Matthias Schwierz	(Germany)	–	–	–	–	–	–	–	–	1	2	–	–	3
49	Daniel Greig	(Australia)	–	–	–	–	0	–	0	–	2	0	–	–	2
49	Richard MacLennan	(Canada)	0	2	–	–	–	–	–	–	–	–	–	–	2
51	Jan Bos	(Netherlands)	–	–	–	–	–	1	0	0	–	–	–	–	1
51	Sergey Chadayev	(Russia)	1	0	0	0	0	0	–	0	–	–	–	–	1
51	Aleksandr Lebedev	(Russia)	0	0	0	0	1	–	–	0	–	–	–	–	1
51	Matthew Plummer	(United States)	0	0	0	0	0	0	0	0	0	1	–	–	1
