= 2009–10 ISU Speed Skating World Cup – Men's 1500 metres =

The 1500 metres distance for men in the 2009–10 ISU Speed Skating World Cup was contested over six races on six occasions, out of a total of seven World Cup occasions for the season, with the first occasion taking place in Berlin, Germany, on 6–8 November 2009, and the final occasion taking place in Heerenveen, Netherlands, on 12–14 March 2010.

Shani Davis of the United States successfully defended his title from the previous season, while Håvard Bøkko of Norway came second, improving on his third place from the previous season, and Denny Morrison of Canada came third.

On the fifth competition weekend, in Salt Lake City, Davis set a new world record of 1:41.04.

== Top three ==
Medal	Athlete	Points	Previous season
Gold	(United States) Shani Davis	630	1st
Silver	(Norway) Håvard Bøkko	395	3rd
Bronze	(Canada) Denny Morrison	338	7th

== Race medallists ==
Occasion #	Location	Date	Gold	Time	Silver	Time	Bronze	Time	Report
1	Berlin, Germany	8 November	Shani Davis; United States	1:44.47	Håvard Bøkko; Norway	1:45.56	Denny Morrison; Canada	1:45.69	
2	Heerenveen, Netherlands	13 November	Shani Davis; United States	1:44.48	Håvard Bøkko; Norway	1:45.57	Stefan Groothuis; Netherlands	1:45.74	
3	Hamar, Norway	21 November	Shani Davis; United States	1:44.27	Lucas Makowsky; Canada	1:45.40	Håvard Bøkko; Norway	1:45.61	
4	Calgary, Canada	4 December	Chad Hedrick; United States	1:42.14	Shani Davis; United States	1:42.19	Denny Morrison; Canada	1:42.74	
5	Salt Lake City, United States	11 December	Shani Davis; United States	1:41.04; WR	Chad Hedrick; United States	1:42.19	Mo Tae-bum; South Korea	1:42.85	
7	Heerenveen, Netherlands	12 March	Shani Davis; United States	1:45.20	Denny Morrison; Canada	1:46.12	Kjeld Nuis; Netherlands	1:46.61	

== Final standings ==
Standings as of 14 March 2010 (end of the season).

#	Name	Nat.	BER	HVN1	HAM	CAL	SLC	HVN2	Total
1	Shani Davis	(United States)	100	100	100	80	100	150	630
2	Håvard Bøkko	(Norway)	80	80	70	60	60	45	395
3	Denny Morrison	(Canada)	70	28	–	70	50	120	338
4	Mark Tuitert	(Netherlands)	50	60	45	45	–	90	290
5	Chad Hedrick	(United States)	28	0	60	100	80	–	268
6	Stefan Groothuis	(Netherlands)	60	70	10	50	–	75	265
7	Lucas Makowsky	(Canada)	18	36	80	28	36	32	230
8	Ivan Skobrev	(Russia)	36	45	40	36	40	–	197
9	Rhian Ket	(Netherlands)	40	50	14	32	–	28	164
10	Kjeld Nuis	(Netherlands)	–	–	25	18	6	105	154
11	Trevor Marsicano	(United States)	10	19	28	40	21	36	154
12	Enrico Fabris	(Italy)	21	32	50	5	45	–	153
13	Yevgeny Lalenkov	(Russia)	45	18	–	24	16	18	121
14	Konrad Niedźwiedzki	(Poland)	24	12	21	21	28	12	118
15	Remco olde Heuvel	(Netherlands)	16	40	36	–	–	24	116
16	Mo Tae-bum	(South Korea)	12	8	–	25	70	–	115
17	Mikael Flygind-Larsen	(Norway)	32	21	12	8	14	21	108
18	Mathieu Giroux	(Canada)	14	24	32	14	8	14	106
19	Matteo Anesi	(Italy)	15	16	18	12	24	10	95
20	Denis Kuzin	(Kazakhstan)	19	14	8	6	–	40	87
21	Aleksey Yesin	(Russia)	11	10	–	15	10	16	62
22	Brian Hansen	(United States)	8	1	24	16	12	–	61
23	Robert Lehmann	(Germany)	1	0	11	–	25	8	45
24	Joel Eriksson	(Sweden)	0	6	16	4	18	–	44
25	Teruhiro Sugimori	(Japan)	5	0	4	6	19	–	34
26	Erben Wennemars	(Netherlands)	8	25	–	–	0	–	33
27	Sven Kramer	(Netherlands)	–	–	–	–	32	–	32
28	Mun Jun	(South Korea)	25	6	–	0	–	–	31
29	Steven Elm	(Canada)	4	2	–	8	15	–	29
30	Jonathan Kuck	(United States)	4	15	5	2	1	–	27
31	Alexis Contin	(France)	0	–	15	10	–	–	25
32	Simon Kuipers	(Netherlands)	–	–	–	19	–	–	19
33	Jeff Kitura	(Canada)	–	–	19	–	–	–	19
34	Zbigniew Bródka	(Poland)	0	–	6	11	0	–	17
34	Christoffer Fagerli Rukke	(Norway)	6	11	–	0	0	–	17
36	Jörg Dallmann	(Germany)	2	4	6	0	4	–	16
37	Samuel Schwarz	(Germany)	–	–	–	–	11	–	11
38	Lee Jong-woo	(South Korea)	0	8	–	0	2	–	10
39	Johan Röjler	(Sweden)	–	–	8	1	–	–	9
40	Haralds Silovs	(Latvia)	–	–	–	0	8	–	8
41	Aleksandr Lebedev	(Russia)	2	0	–	0	6	–	8
42	Ha Hong-sun	(South Korea)	6	0	–	0	0	–	6
43	Daniel Friberg	(Sweden)	3	0	–	0	0	–	3
44	Takaharu Nakajima	(Japan)	0	0	2	0	0	–	2
45	Sverre Haugli	(Norway)	–	0	1	–	–	–	1
45	Jan Friesinger	(Germany)	1	–	–	0	–	–	1
