= 2009–10 ISU Speed Skating World Cup – Women's 3000 and 5000 metres =

The 3000 and 5000 metres distances for women in the 2009–10 ISU Speed Skating World Cup were contested over six races on six occasions, out of a total of nine World Cup occasions for the season, with the first occasion taking place in Berlin, Germany, on 6–8 November 2009, and the final occasion taking place in Heerenveen, Netherlands, on 12–14 March 2010.

Martina Sáblíková of the Czech Republic successfully defended her title from the previous season, while Stephanie Beckert of Germany came second, and Daniela Anschütz-Thoms, also of Germany, came third.

== Top three ==
Medal	Athlete	Points	Previous season
Gold	(Czech Republic) Martina Sáblíková	610	1st
Silver	(Germany) Stephanie Beckert	535	4th
Bronze	(Germany) Daniela Anschütz-Thoms	435	2nd

== Race medallists ==
Occasion #	Location	Date	Distance	Gold	Time	Silver	Time	Bronze	Time	Report
1	Berlin, Germany	6 November	3000 metres	Martina Sáblíková; Czech Republic	4:00.75	Masako Hozumi; Japan	4:06.25	Stephanie Beckert; Germany	4:07.17	
2	Heerenveen, Netherlands	13 November	3000 metres	Stephanie Beckert; Germany	4:05.29	Martina Sáblíková; Czech Republic	4:05.68	Daniela Anschütz-Thoms; Germany	4:05.73	
3	Hamar, Norway	21 November	5000 metres	Martina Sáblíková; Czech Republic	6:50.07	Stephanie Beckert; Germany	6:52.79	Daniela Anschütz-Thoms; Germany	6:59.62	
4	Calgary, Canada	4 December	3000 metres	Stephanie Beckert; Germany	3:56.80	Martina Sáblíková; Czech Republic	3:56.83	Daniela Anschütz-Thoms; Germany	3:58.07	
5	Salt Lake City, United States	11 December	3000 metres	Martina Sáblíková; Czech Republic	3:56.29	Stephanie Beckert; Germany	3:57.78	Kristina Groves; Canada	3:58.67	
7	Heerenveen, Netherlands	12 March	3000 metres	Martina Sáblíková; Czech Republic	4:06.25	Daniela Anschütz-Thoms; Germany	4:06.54	Stephanie Beckert; Germany	4:07.57	

== Final standings ==
Standings as of 14 March 2010 (end of the season).

#	Name	Nat.	BER	HVN1	HAM	CAL	SLC	HVN2	Total
1	Martina Sáblíková	(Czech Republic)	100	80	100	80	100	150	610
2	Stephanie Beckert	(Germany)	70	100	80	100	80	105	535
3	Daniela Anschütz-Thoms	(Germany)	60	70	70	70	45	120	435
4	Kristina Groves	(Canada)	50	60	50	60	70	90	380
5	Masako Hozumi	(Japan)	80	32	30	40	40	36	258
6	Maren Haugli	(Norway)	36	36	45	50	50	40	257
7	Clara Hughes	(Canada)	40	50	60	24	36	–	210
8	Brittany Schussler	(Canada)	45	40	–	36	32	28	181
9	Ireen Wüst	(Netherlands)	24	45	–	45	60	–	174
10	Shiho Ishizawa	(Japan)	28	28	40	10	24	10	140
11	Renate Groenewold	(Netherlands)	18	16	20	8	–	75	137
12	Jilleanne Rookard	(United States)	6	4	35	28	16	32	121
13	Cindy Klassen	(Canada)	32	18	–	32	21	18	121
14	Katrin Mattscherodt	(Germany)	4	0	30	18	28	24	104
15	Catherine Raney-Norman	(United States)	25	14	25	21	14	–	99
16	Diane Valkenburg	(Netherlands)	10	25	–	16	0	45	96
17	Nancy Swider-Peltz, Jr	(United States)	11	12	25	12	8	21	89
18	Moniek Kleinsman	(Netherlands)	21	21	15	5	10	14	86
19	Elma de Vries	(Netherlands)	–	–	35	–	25	16	76
20	Lee Ju-yeon	(South Korea)	15	24	–	6	12	–	57
21	Hiromi Otsu	(Japan)	12	8	13	15	6	–	54
22	Cathrine Grage	(Denmark)	8	0	21	0	15	8	52
23	Eri Natori	(Japan)	0	6	9	19	5	12	51
24	Wang Fei	(China)	0	–	15	25	–	–	40
25	Anna Rokita	(Austria)	0	1	7	11	19	–	38
26	Luiza Złotkowska	(Poland)	6	8	8	8	8	–	38
27	Svetlana Vysokova	(Russia)	2	11	18	0	6	–	37
28	Mari Hemmer	(Norway)	4	19	5	0	0	–	28
29	Eriko Ishino	(Japan)	16	10	0	0	2	–	28
30	Noh Seon-yeong	(South Korea)	19	6	–	0	0	–	25
31	Fu Chunyan	(China)	0	2	6	1	11	–	20
32	Claudia Pechstein	(Germany)	–	–	–	–	18	–	18
33	Maria Lamb	(United States)	5	0	10	–	0	–	15
33	Park Do-yeong	(South Korea)	3	15	–	0	0	–	18
35	Jorien Voorhuis	(Netherlands)	–	–	–	14	0	–	14
36	Katarzyna Bachleda-Curuś	(Poland)	14	0	–	–	–	–	14
37	Annouk van der Weijden	(Netherlands)	8	0	4	–	–	–	12
38	Nicole Garrido	(Canada)	0	0	11	0	–	–	11
39	Yuliya Skokova	(Russia)	0	0	–	6	0	–	6
40	Paulien van Deutekom	(Netherlands)	–	–	–	–	4	–	4
41	Galina Likhachova	(Russia)	0	–	–	4	–	–	4
42	Kristina Tsybina	(Russia)	–	–	3	–	–	–	3
43	Isabell Ost	(Germany)	2	0	–	0	1	–	3
43	Katarzyna Woźniak	(Poland)	1	–	–	2	–	–	3
45	Gretha Smit	(Netherlands)	–	–	2	–	–	–	2
46	Olga Graf	(Russia)	0	0	1	–	–	–	1
46	Alexandra Lipp	(Germany)	1	–	–	–	–	–	1
