= 2009–10 ISU Speed Skating World Cup – Women's team pursuit =

The women's team pursuit in the 2009–10 ISU Speed Skating World Cup was contested over four races on four occasions, out of a total of seven World Cup occasions for the season, with the first occasion involving the event taking place in Heerenveen, Netherlands, on 13–15 November 2009, and the last occasion taking place, also in Heerenveen, on 12–14 March 2010.

Canada won the cup, while Russia came second, and Germany came third. The defending champions, the Czech Republic, ended up in 11th place.

On the fourth competition weekend, Canada's team, comprised by Kristina Groves, Christine Nesbitt and Brittany Schussler, set a new world record of 2:55.79.

== Top three ==
Medal	Country	Points	Previous season
Gold	Canada	430	8th
Silver	Russia	320	7th
Bronze	Germany	210	4th

== Race medallists ==
Occasion #	Date	Location	Gold	Time	Silver	Time	Bronze	Time	Report
2	Heerenveen, Netherlands	15 November	Canada; Kristina Groves; Christine Nesbitt; Brittany Schussler	3:00.39	Netherlands; Diane Valkenburg; Elma de Vries; Ireen Wüst	3:02.12	Russia; Yekaterina Abramova; Galina Likhachova; Yekaterina Shikhova	3:02.40	
4	Calgary, Canada	6 December	Canada; Kristina Groves; Christine Nesbitt; Brittany Schussler	2:55.79; WR	Japan; Masako Hozumi; Maki Tabata; Shiho Ishizawa	2:59.79	Germany; Isabell Ost; Stephanie Beckert; Katrin Mattscherodt	3:00.25	
5	Salt Lake City, United States	13 December	Russia; Yekaterina Abramova; Galina Likhachova; Yekaterina Shikhova	2:57.18	Canada; Kristina Groves; Christine Nesbitt; Cindy Klassen	2:57.35	Germany; Daniela Anschütz-Thoms; Stephanie Beckert; Katrin Mattscherodt	2:57.36	
7	Heerenveen, Netherlands	14 March	Canada; Kristina Groves; Cindy Klassen; Brittany Schussler	3:02.05	Germany; Stephanie Beckert; Anni Friesinger-Postma; Katrin Mattscherodt	3:03.43	Japan; Masako Hozumi; Nao Kodaira; Maki Tabata	3:04.58	

== Final standings ==
Standings as of 14 March 2010 (end of the season).

#	Name	HVN1	CAL	SLC	HVN2	Total
1	Canada	100	100	80	150	430
2	Russia	70	60	100	90	320
3	Germany	50	70	70	120	310
3	Japan	60	80	50	105	295
5	Netherlands	80	45	60		185
6	South Korea	40	50	45	–	135
7	United States	45	32	40	–	117
8	China	36	40	32	–	108
9	Poland	32	36	36	–	104
10	Kazakhstan	–	28	28	–	56
11	Czech Republic	28	–	–	–	28
12	Norway	24	0	–	–	24
