= 2009–10 ISU Speed Skating World Cup – Men's team pursuit =

The men's team pursuit in the 2009–10 ISU Speed Skating World Cup was contested over four races on four occasions, out of a total of seven World Cup occasions for the season, with the first occasion involving the event taking place in Heerenveen, Netherlands, on 13–15 November 2009, and the last occasion also taking place in Heerenveen, on 12–14 March 2010.

Norway won the cup, while the Netherlands came second, and Canada, the defending champions, came third.

== Top three ==
Medal	Country	Points	Previous season
Gold	Norway	380	6th
Silver	Netherlands	350	7th
Bronze	Canada	306	1st

== Race medallists ==
Occasion #	Location	Date	Gold	Time	Silver	Time	Bronze	Time	Report
2	Heerenveen, Netherlands	15 November	United States; Shani Davis; Chad Hedrick; Trevor Marsicano; Netherlands; Jan Blokhuijsen; Remco olde Heuvel; Koen Verweij	3:43.94			Italy; Matteo Anesi; Enrico Fabris; Luca Stefani	3:45.62	
4	Calgary, Canada	6 December	Netherlands; Sven Kramer; Carl Verheijen; Jan Blokhuijsen	3:38.05	Canada; Denny Morrison; Lucas Makowsky; Mathieu Giroux	3:39.17	Norway; Håvard Bøkko; Sverre Lunde Pedersen; Fredrik van der Horst	3:41.59	
5	Salt Lake City, United States	13 December	Norway; Håvard Bøkko; Mikael Flygind Larsen; Henrik Christiansen	3:39.55	Italy; Matteo Anesi; Enrico Fabris; Luca Stefani	3:39.72	Canada; Steven Elm; Lucas Makowsky; Mathieu Giroux	3:40.34	
7	Heerenveen, Netherlands	14 March	Norway; Håvard Bøkko; Henrik Christiansen; Mikael Flygind Larsen	3:42.77	Canada; Mathieu Giroux; Denny Morrison; Lucas Makowsky	3:44.30	United States; Ryan Bedford; Shani Davis; Jonathan Kuck	3:45.70	

== Final standings ==
Standings as of 14 March 2010 (end of the season).

#	Name	HVN1	CAL	SLC	HVN2	Total
1	Norway	60	70	100	150	380
2	Netherlands	100	100	60	90	350
3	Canada	36	80	70	120	306
4	United States	100	40	40	105	285
5	Italy	70	28	80	–	178
6	Japan	45	60	50	–	155
7	Sweden	50	50	36	–	136
8	Russia	32	45	32	–	109
9	Poland	40	32	21	–	93
10	Germany	28	36	28	–	92
11	South Korea	24	14	45	–	83
12	Kazakhstan	16	21	24	–	61
13	China	18	24	–	–	42
14	Romania	–	16	18	–	34
15	Czech Republic	14	18	–	–	32
16	France	21	–	–	–	21
