= 2011 World Single Distance Speed Skating Championships – Women's 500 metres =

The women's 500 metres race of the 2011 World Single Distance Speed Skating Championships was held on 13 March at 12:00 (Round 1) and 13:30 (Round 2) local time.

== Results ==
Rank	Name	Country	Pair	Lane	Race 1	Rank	Pair	Lane	Race 2	Rank	Total	Time behind
1st place, gold medalist(s)	Jenny Wolf	Germany	11	o	37.98	1	11	i	37.95	1	75.930	
2nd place, silver medalist(s)	Lee Sang-hwa	South Korea	12	i	38.14	3	10	o	38.03	2	76.170	+0.24
3rd place, bronze medalist(s)	Wang Beixing	China	6	o	38.35	4	10	i	38.04	3	76.390	+0.46
4	Annette Gerritsen	Netherlands	8	i	38.14	2	11	o	38.33	7	76.470	+0.54
5	Judith Hesse	Germany	9	o	38.50	6	9	i	38.13	4	76.630	+0.70
6	Heather Richardson	United States	11	i	38.51	8	8	o	38.30	6	76.810	+0.88
7	Margot Boer	Netherlands	12	o	38.51	7	8	i	38.37	8	76.880	+0.95
8	Nao Kodaira	Japan	10	o	38.67	10	7	i	38.27	5	76.940	+1.01
9	Zhang Hong	China	5	i	38.48	5	9	o	38.61	11	77.090	+1.16
10	Maki Tsuji	Japan	9	i	38.67	9	7	o	38.51	10	77.180	+1.25
11	Karolína Erbanová	Czech Republic	5	o	38.97	14	4	i	38.49	9	77.460	+1.53
12	Shannon Rempel	Canada	7	o	38.95	13	5	i	38.72	13	77.670	+1.74
13	Lauren Cholewinski	United States	4	o	39.03	15	3	i	38.69	12	77.720	+1.79
14	Olga Fatkulina	Russia	3	o	38.94	12	6	i	38.93	15	77.870	+1.94
15	Yekaterina Aydova	Kazakhstan	3	i	38.84	11	6	o	39.22	20	78.060	+2.13
16	Chiara Simionato	Italy	1	i	39.18	17	4	o	39.07	16	78.250	+2.32
17	Yukana Nishina	Japan	6	i	39.12	16	5	o	39.16	18	78.280	+2.35
18	Rebekah Bradford	United States	2	i	39.29	18	3	o	39.08	17	78.370	+2.44
19	Lee Bo-ra	South Korea	7	i	39.36	20	2	o	39.20	19	78.560	+2.63
20	Anastasia Bucsis	Canada	2	o	39.32	19	2	i	39.24	21	78.560	+2.63
21	Qi Shuai	China	8	o	39.36	21	1	i	39.43	22	78.790	+2.86
22	Laurine van Riessen	Netherlands	10	i	1:41.56	23	1	o	38.84	14	140.400	+64.47
23	Monique Angermüller	Germany	4	i	1:35.85	22						
