= List of Australian records in speed skating =

The following are the national records in speed skating in Australia maintained by the Australian Ice Racing Inc.

== Men ==
Key to tables: Awaiting ratification Not ratified or later rescinded by Australian Ice Racing Inc.

| Event | Record | Athlete | Date | Meet | Place | Ref |
|---|---|---|---|---|---|---|
| 500 meters | 34.64 | Daniel Greig | 26 January 2013 | World Sprint Championships | Salt Lake City, United States | |
| 500 meters × 2 | | | | | | |
| 1000 meters | 1:08.26 | Daniel Greig | 10 December 2017 | World Cup | Salt Lake City, United States | |
| 1500 meters | 1:47.65 | Ben Southee | 11 December 2009 | World Cup | Salt Lake City, United States | |
| 3000 meters | 3:53.79 | Joshua Capponi | 12 December 2016 | | Heerenveen, Netherlands | |
| 5000 meters | 6:27.03 | Joshua Lose | 12 December 2009 | World Cup | Salt Lake City, United States | |
| 10000 meters | 13:23.47 | Joshua Lose | 19 February 2011 | World Cup | Salt Lake City, United States | |
| Team pursuit (8 laps) | | | | | | |
| Sprint combination | 140.145 pts | Daniel Greig | 21–22 January 2012 | World Cup | Salt Lake City, United States | |
| Small combination | 161.580 pts | Luke Zeliff | 20–23 March 2025 | Olympic Oval Finale | Calgary, Canada | |
| Big combination | 158.569 pts | Joshua Lose | 18–20 March 2009 | Olympic Oval Finale | Calgary, Canada | |

== Women ==
| Event | Record | Athlete | Date | Meet | Place | Ref |
|---|---|---|---|---|---|---|
| 500 meters | 38.60 | Sophie Muir | 12 December 2009 | World Cup | Salt Lake City, United States | |
| 500 meters × 2 | | | | | | |
| 1000 meters | 1:16.18 | Sophie Muir | 13 December 2009 | World Cup | Salt Lake City, United States | |
| 1500 meters | 2:04.45 | Brooke Lochland | 20 March 2011 | Olympic Oval Final | Calgary, Canada | |
| 3000 meters | 4:20.25 | Brooke Lochland | 16 March 2011 | Olympic Oval Final | Calgary, Canada | |
| 5000 meters | 7:35.20 | Brooke Lochland | 16 March 2011 | Olympic Oval Final | Calgary, Canada | |
| 10000 meters | | | | | | |
| Team pursuit (6 laps) | | | | | | |
| Sprint combination | 159.060 | Sophie Muir | 16–17 January 2010 | World Sprint Championships | Obihiro, Japan | |
| Mini combination | 169.278 pts | Brooke Lochland | 15–16 March 2011 | Olympic Oval Final | Calgary, Canada | |
| Small combination | 176.393 pts | Brooke Lochland | 14–15 January 2012 | North America/Oceania Qualification | Calgary, Canada | |
