= Justine L'Heureux =

Canadian speed skater

Personal information
- Born: March 1989 (age 37)

Sport
- Country: Canada
- Sport: Speed skating

Justine L'Heureux (born March 1989) is a Canadian former long track speed skater.

L'Heureux represented her nation at international competitions. After competing at the 2005, 2006 and 2007 World Junior Speed Skating Championships, she finished in 2008 overall second. She made at elite level her ISU Speed Skating World Cup debut during the 2005–06 ISU Speed Skating World Cup season in the B-division. The later seasons she also competed sometimes in the A-division. She rode her last world cup race during the 2009–10 ISU Speed Skating World Cup season.

At the 2006 Canadian Single Distance Championships she won the bronze medal in the 3000 metres event.

== Records ==
=== Personal records ===
Personal records
Women's speed skating
Event	Result	Date	Location	Notes
500 m	39,75	04.01.2008	Calgary	
1000 m	1.16,80	04.01.2008	Calgary	
1500 m	1.58,79	05.01.2008	Calgary	
3000 m	4.12,75	08.01.2006	Calgary	
5000 m	7.23,67	29.10.2005	Calgary	
