= 2009–10 ISU Speed Skating World Cup – World Cup 6 =

The sixth competition weekend of the 2009–10 ISU Speed Skating World Cup was held in the Gunda Niemann-Stirnemann-Halle, Erfurt, Germany, from Saturday, 6 March, until Sunday, 7 March 2010.

== Schedule of events ==
The schedule of the event is below.

Date	Time	Events
6 March	13:30 CET	500 m women 500 m men 1000 m women 1000 m men
7 March	14:30 CET	500 m women 500 m men 1000 m women 1000 m men

== Medal summary ==
=== Men's events ===
Event	Race #	Gold	Time	Silver	Time	Bronze	Time	Report
500 m	1	Jan Smeekens; Netherlands	34.97	Yuya Oikawa; Japan	35.10	Ronald Mulder; Netherlands	35.25	
500 m	2	Jan Smeekens; Netherlands	35.20	Yuya Oikawa; Japan	35.21	Mika Poutala; Finland; Dmitry Lobkov; Russia	35.22	
1000 m	1	Shani Davis; United States	1:09.29	Mark Tuitert; Netherlands	1:09.43	Stefan Groothuis; Netherlands	1:09.48	
1000 m	2	Shani Davis; United States	1:09.25	Stefan Groothuis; Netherlands	1:09.50	Mark Tuitert; Netherlands	1:09.64	

=== Women's events ===
Event	Race #	Gold	Time	Silver	Time	Bronze	Time	Report
500 m	1	Jenny Wolf; Germany	38.08	Margot Boer; Netherlands	38.49	Heather Richardson; United States	38.93	
500 m	2	Jenny Wolf; Germany	38.10	Margot Boer; Netherlands	38.41	Thijsje Oenema; Netherlands	38.80	
1000 m	1	Monique Angermüller; Germany	1:16.36	Margot Boer; Netherlands	1:16.48	Natasja Bruintjes; Netherlands	1:16.59	
1000 m	2	Yekaterina Shikhova; Russia	1:16.93	Laurine van Riessen; Netherlands	1:17.18	Natasja Bruintjes; Netherlands	1:17.29	
