= ISU Speed Skating World Cup =

International speed skating competition

The ISU Speed Skating World Cup is a series of international speed skating competitions, organised annually by the International Skating Union since the winter of 1985–86. Every year during the winter season, a number of competitions on different distances and on different locations are held. Skaters can earn points at each competition, and the skater who has the most points on a given distance at the end of the series is the winner. Initially not very popular with skaters nor spectators, the World Cup has gradually become more and more popular, and this was due to the creation of the World Single Distance Championships. The results of the separate distances in the World Cup ranking are the main qualifying method for the World Single Distance Championships.

The number of races per season per distance varies, but it is usually between five and ten. Ten World Cup titles are awarded every season, five for men (the 500 m, the 1000 m, the 1500 m, the combined 5000 m / 10000 m, and the team pursuit), and five for women (the 500 m, the 1000 m, the 1500 m, the combined 3000 m / 5000 m, and the team pursuit).

The team pursuit was added to the World Cup in the 2005–06 season. Between the seasons 2003–04 and 2008–09, the 100 m was also contested for men and women, but this category is now defunct.

The mass start was re-introduced for both women and men in the World Cup in Astana in 2011.

== Overall World Cup winners ==
=== Men ===
Season	100 m	500 m	1000 m	1500 m	5000 / 10000 m	Team pursuit	Team sprint	Mass start
1985–86		(United States) Dan Jansen	(United States) Dan Jansen	(Austria) Michael Hadschieff	(United States) Dave Silk			
1986–87		(United States) Nick Thometz	(United States) Nick Thometz	(Sweden) Hans Magnusson	(Norway) Geir Karlstad			
1987–88		(United States) Dan Jansen	(East Germany) Uwe-Jens Mey	(East Germany) André Hoffmann	(Sweden) Tomas Gustafson			
1988–89		(East Germany) Uwe-Jens Mey	(East Germany) Uwe-Jens Mey	(United States) Eric Flaim (Austria) Michael Hadschieff (2)	(Netherlands) Gerard Kemkers			
1989–90		(East Germany) Uwe-Jens Mey	(East Germany) Uwe-Jens Mey (3)	(Norway) Johann Olav Koss	(Netherlands) Bart Veldkamp			
1990–91		(Germany) Uwe-Jens Mey (3)	(Soviet Union) Igor Zhelezovski	(Norway) Johann Olav Koss (2)	(Norway) Johann Olav Koss			
1991–92		(United States) Dan Jansen	(Commonwealth of Independent States) Igor Zhelezovski	(Netherlands) Falko Zandstra	(Norway) Geir Karlstad (2)			
1992–93		(United States) Dan Jansen	(Belarus) Igor Zhelezovski (3)	(Netherlands) Rintje Ritsma	(Netherlands) Bart Veldkamp			
1993–94		(United States) Dan Jansen (5)	(United States) Dan Jansen (2)	(Netherlands) Falko Zandstra (2)	(Norway) Johann Olav Koss (2)			
1994–95		(Japan) Hiroyasu Shimizu	(Japan) Yukinori Miyabe	(Canada) Neal Marshall	(Netherlands) Rintje Ritsma			
1995–96		(Japan) Manabu Horii	(Norway) Ådne Søndrål	(Japan) Hiroyuki Noake	(Netherlands) Rintje Ritsma			
1996–97		(Japan) Hiroyasu Shimizu	(Japan) Manabu Horii	(Netherlands) Rintje Ritsma (2)	(Netherlands) Rintje Ritsma (3)			
1997–98		(Canada) Jeremy Wotherspoon	(Canada) Jeremy Wotherspoon	(Netherlands) Ids Postma	(Netherlands) Gianni Romme			
1998–99		(Canada) Jeremy Wotherspoon	(Canada) Jeremy Wotherspoon	(Norway) Ådne Søndrål	(Belgium) Bart Veldkamp (3)			
1999–2000		(Canada) Jeremy Wotherspoon	(Canada) Jeremy Wotherspoon	(Norway) Ådne Søndrål	(Netherlands) Gianni Romme			
2000–01		(Japan) Hiroyasu Shimizu (3)	(Canada) Jeremy Wotherspoon	(Russia) Aleksandr Kibalko	(Netherlands) Gianni Romme			
2001–02		(Canada) Jeremy Wotherspoon	(Canada) Jeremy Wotherspoon (5)	(Norway) Ådne Søndrål (3)	(Netherlands) Gianni Romme (4)			
2002–03		(Canada) Jeremy Wotherspoon	(Netherlands) Erben Wennemars	(Russia) Yevgeny Lalenkov	(Netherlands) Carl Verheijen			
2003–04	(China) Yu Fengtong	(Canada) Jeremy Wotherspoon	(Netherlands) Erben Wennemars	(Netherlands) Mark Tuitert	(Netherlands) Bob de Jong			
2004–05	(China) Yu Fengtong (2)	(Canada) Jeremy Wotherspoon	(Netherlands) Erben Wennemars	(Netherlands) Mark Tuitert (2)	(Norway) Øystein Grødum	Italy		
2005–06	(Japan) Yūya Oikawa	(South Korea) Lee Kang-seok	(United States) Shani Davis	(United States) Chad Hedrick	(United States) Chad Hedrick	Canada		
2006–07	(Japan) Yūya Oikawa	(United States) Tucker Fredricks	(Netherlands) Erben Wennemars (4)	(Netherlands) Erben Wennemars	(Netherlands) Sven Kramer	Netherlands		
2007–08	(South Korea) Lee Kang-seok	(Canada) Jeremy Wotherspoon (8)	(United States) Shani Davis	(United States) Shani Davis	(Norway) Håvard Bøkko	Netherlands		
2008–09	(Japan) Yūya Oikawa (3)	(China) Yu Fengtong	(United States) Shani Davis	(United States) Shani Davis	(Netherlands) Sven Kramer	Canada (2)		
2009–10		(United States) Tucker Fredricks (2)	(United States) Shani Davis	(United States) Shani Davis	(Norway) Håvard Bøkko (2)	Norway		
2010–11		(South Korea) Lee Kang-seok (2)	(Netherlands) Stefan Groothuis	(United States) Shani Davis (4)	(Netherlands) Bob de Jong	Norway		
2011–12		(South Korea) Mo Tae-bum	(United States) Shani Davis	(Norway) Håvard Bøkko	(Netherlands) Bob de Jong (3)	Netherlands		(France) Alexis Contin
2012–13		(Netherlands) Jan Smeekens	(Netherlands) Kjeld Nuis	(Poland) Zbigniew Bródka	(Netherlands) Jorrit Bergsma	Netherlands		(Netherlands) Arjan Stroetinga
2013–14		(Netherlands) Ronald Mulder	(United States) Shani Davis (6)	(Netherlands) Koen Verweij	(Netherlands) Jorrit Bergsma	Netherlands		(Netherlands) Bob de Vries
2014–15		(Russia) Pavel Kulizhnikov	(Russia) Pavel Kulizhnikov	(Canada) Denny Morrison	(Netherlands) Jorrit Bergsma	South Korea		(South Korea) Lee Seung-hoon
2015–16		(Russia) Pavel Kulizhnikov	(Netherlands) Kjeld Nuis	(Russia) Denis Yuskov	(Netherlands) Sven Kramer (3)	Netherlands	Netherlands	(Netherlands) Arjan Stroetinga (2)
2016–17		(Netherlands) Dai Dai N'tab	(Netherlands) Kjeld Nuis	(Netherlands) Kjeld Nuis	(Netherlands) Jorrit Bergsma (4)	Netherlands (7)	Canada	(South Korea) Lee Seung-hoon (2)
2017–18		(Norway) Håvard Holmefjord Lorentzen	(Netherlands) Kjeld Nuis	(Russia) Denis Yuskov	(Canada) Ted-Jan Bloemen	Norway	Norway	(Belgium) Bart Swings
2018–19		(Russia) Pavel Kulizhnikov (3)	(Netherlands) Kjeld Nuis (5)	(Russia) Denis Yuskov (3)	(Russia) Aleksandr Rumyantsev	Norway	Netherlands	(South Korea) Um Cheon-ho
2019–20		(Japan) Tatsuya Shinhama	(Netherlands) Thomas Krol	(Netherlands) Kjeld Nuis	(Netherlands) Patrick Roest	Russia	Netherlands	(Belgium) Bart Swings
2020–21		(Netherlands) Dai Dai N'tab (2)	(Netherlands) Kai Verbij	(Netherlands) Thomas Krol	(Netherlands) Patrick Roest (2)	Norway (5)		(Belgium) Bart Swings
2021–22		(Canada) Laurent Dubreuil	(Netherlands) Thomas Krol (2)	(United States) Joey Mantia	(Sweden) Nils van der Poel	United States	China	(Belgium) Bart Swings
2022–23		(Canada) Laurent Dubreuil (2)	(Netherlands) Hein Otterspeer	(Netherlands) Kjeld Nuis (3)	(Netherlands) Beau Snellink	United States	Netherlands (4)	(Belgium) Bart Swings (5)
2023–24		(Japan) Wataru Morishige	(China) Ning Zhongyan	(China) Ning Zhongyan	(Italy) Davide Ghiotto	United States	United States	(Italy) Andrea Giovannini
2024–25		(United States) Jordan Stolz	(United States) Jordan Stolz	(United States) Jordan Stolz	(Norway) Sander Eitrem	United States	United States	(Italy) Andrea Giovannini (2)
2025–26		(United States) Jordan Stolz (2)	(United States) Jordan Stolz (2)	(United States) Jordan Stolz (2)	(Czech Republic) Metoděj Jílek	United States (5)	United States (3)	(Netherlands) Jorrit Bergsma
2026–27								

Source: SpeedSkatingStats.com

=== Women ===
Season	100 m	500 m	1000 m	1500 m	3000 / 5000 m	Team pursuit	Team sprint	Mass start
1985–86		(East Germany) Christa Rothenburger	(East Germany) Karin Kania	(Sweden) Annette Carlén-Karlsson	(East Germany) Andrea Ehrig			
1986–87		(United States) Bonnie Blair	(United States) Bonnie Blair	(Netherlands) Yvonne van Gennip	(Netherlands) Yvonne van Gennip			
1987–88		(East Germany) Christa Rothenburger	(East Germany) Christa Rothenburger	(United States) Bonnie Blair	(East Germany) Gabi Zange			
1988–89		(East Germany) Christa Luding-Rothenburger (3)	(East Germany) Angela Hauck-Stahnke	(East Germany) Constanze Moser	(Germany) Heike Schalling			
1989–90		(United States) Bonnie Blair (East Germany) Angela Stahnke	(Japan) Seiko Hashimoto	(East Germany) Jacqueline Börner	(East Germany) Gunda Kleemann			
1990–91		(Japan) Kyoko Shimazaki	(Germany) Monique Garbrecht	(Germany) Gunda Kleemann	(Germany) Heike Warnicke (2)			
1991–92		(United States) Bonnie Blair	(United States) Bonnie Blair	(Germany) Gunda Niemann	(Germany) Gunda Niemann			
1992–93		(China) Ye Qiaobo	(United States) Bonnie Blair	(Germany) Gunda Niemann	(Germany) Gunda Niemann			
1993–94		(United States) Bonnie Blair	(United States) Bonnie Blair	(Austria) Emese Hunyady	(Germany) Gunda Niemann			
1994–95		(United States) Bonnie Blair (5)	(United States) Bonnie Blair (5)	(Germany) Gunda Niemann	(Germany) Gunda Niemann			
1995–96		(Russia) Svetlana Zhurova	(United States) Chris Witty	(Germany) Gunda Niemann	(Germany) Gunda Niemann			
1996–97		(China) Xue Ruihong	(Germany) Franziska Schenk	(Germany) Gunda Niemann	(Netherlands) Tonny de Jong			
1997–98		(Canada) Catriona Le May Doan	(Canada) Catriona Le May Doan	(Germany) Gunda Niemann-Stirnemann	(Germany) Gunda Niemann-Stirnemann			
1998–99		(Canada) Catriona Le May Doan	(Germany) Monique Garbrecht	(Germany) Gunda Niemann-Stirnemann	(Germany) Gunda Niemann-Stirnemann			
1999–2000		(Germany) Monique Garbrecht	(Germany) Monique Garbrecht	(Germany) Gunda Niemann-Stirnemann (9)	(Germany) Gunda Niemann-Stirnemann			
2000–01		(Canada) Catriona Le May Doan	(Germany) Monique Garbrecht-Enfeldt	(Germany) Anni Friesinger	(Germany) Gunda Niemann-Stirnemann (9)			
2001–02		(Canada) Catriona Le May Doan (4)	(Germany) Sabine Völker	(Germany) Anni Friesinger	(Germany) Anni Friesinger			
2002–03		(Germany) Monique Garbrecht-Enfeldt (2)	(Germany) Monique Garbrecht-Enfeldt (5)	(Canada) Cindy Klassen	(Germany) Claudia Pechstein			
2003–04	(Japan) Shihomi Shinya	(China) Wang Manli	(United States) Jennifer Rodriguez	(Germany) Anni Friesinger (3)	(Germany) Claudia Pechstein			
2004–05	(Japan) Sayuri Osuga	(China) Wang Manli (2)	(Italy) Chiara Simionato	(Canada) Cindy Klassen	(Germany) Claudia Pechstein (3)	Japan		
2005–06	(Germany) Jenny Wolf	(Germany) Jenny Wolf	(Germany) Anni Friesinger	(Canada) Cindy Klassen (3)	(Canada) Cindy Klassen	Germany		
2006–07	(Germany) Jenny Wolf	(Germany) Jenny Wolf	(Italy) Chiara Simionato (2)	(Netherlands) Ireen Wüst	(Czech Republic) Martina Sáblíková	Netherlands		
2007–08	(Germany) Jenny Wolf	(Germany) Jenny Wolf	(Germany) Anni Friesinger (2)	(Canada) Kristina Groves	(Czech Republic) Martina Sáblíková	Canada		
2008–09	(Germany) Jenny Wolf (4)	(Germany) Jenny Wolf	(Canada) Christine Nesbitt	(Canada) Kristina Groves	(Czech Republic) Martina Sáblíková	Czech Republic		
2009–10		(Germany) Jenny Wolf	(Canada) Christine Nesbitt	(Canada) Kristina Groves (3)	(Czech Republic) Martina Sáblíková	Canada		
2010–11		(Germany) Jenny Wolf (6)	(United States) Heather Richardson	(Canada) Christine Nesbitt	(Czech Republic) Martina Sáblíková	Netherlands		
2011–12		(China) Yu Jing	(Canada) Christine Nesbitt (3)	(Canada) Christine Nesbitt (2)	(Czech Republic) Martina Sáblíková	Canada		(Netherlands) Mariska Huisman
2012–13		(South Korea) Lee Sang-hwa	(United States) Heather Richardson	(Netherlands) Marrit Leenstra	(Czech Republic) Martina Sáblíková	Netherlands		(South Korea) Kim Bo-reum
2013–14		(Russia) Olga Fatkulina	(United States) Heather Richardson	(Netherlands) Ireen Wüst	(Czech Republic) Martina Sáblíková	Netherlands		(Italy) Francesca Lollobrigida
2014–15		(Japan) Nao Kodaira	(United States) Brittany Bowe	(Netherlands) Marrit Leenstra (2)	(Czech Republic) Martina Sáblíková	Netherlands		(Canada) Ivanie Blondin
2015–16		(United States) Heather Richardson-Bergsma	(United States) Brittany Bowe	(United States) Brittany Bowe	(Czech Republic) Martina Sáblíková	Japan	China	(Netherlands) Irene Schouten
2016–17		(Japan) Nao Kodaira	(United States) Heather Bergsma (4)	(United States) Heather Bergsma	(Czech Republic) Martina Sáblíková	Japan	Japan	(South Korea) Kim Bo-reum
2017–18		(Austria) Vanessa Herzog	(Russia) Yekaterina Shikhova	(Japan) Miho Takagi	(Netherlands) Antoinette de Jong	Japan	Russia	(Italy) Francesca Lollobrigida
2018–19		(Austria) Vanessa Herzog (2)	(United States) Brittany Bowe	(United States) Brittany Bowe	(Czech Republic) Martina Sáblíková	Japan	Russia (2)	(South Korea) Kim Bo-reum (3)
2019–20		(Japan) Nao Kodaira (3)	(United States) Brittany Bowe	(Netherlands) Ireen Wüst (3)	(Czech Republic) Martina Sáblíková (13)	Canada	Netherlands	(Canada) Ivanie Blondin
2020–21		(Netherlands) Femke Kok	(United States) Brittany Bowe	(United States) Brittany Bowe (3)	(Netherlands) Irene Schouten	Canada		(Netherlands) Irene Schouten (2)
2021–22		(United States) Erin Jackson	(United States) Brittany Bowe (6)	(Japan) Miho Takagi	(Netherlands) Irene Schouten (2)	Canada	Poland	(Italy) Francesca Lollobrigida (3)
2022–23		(South Korea) Kim Min-sun	(Japan) Miho Takagi	(Japan) Miho Takagi	(Norway) Ragne Wiklund	Canada	United States	(Canada) Ivanie Blondin (3)
2023–24		(United States) Erin Jackson	(Japan) Miho Takagi	(Japan) Miho Takagi	(Norway) Ragne Wiklund	Japan (6)	Netherlands	(Canada) Valérie Maltais
2024–25		(United States) Erin Jackson (3)	(Japan) Miho Takagi (3)	(Japan) Miho Takagi	(Norway) Ragne Wiklund	Netherlands (6)	Poland (2)	(Netherlands) Marijke Groenewoud
2025–26		(Netherlands) Femke Kok (2)	(Netherlands) Femke Kok	(Japan) Miho Takagi (6)	(Norway) Ragne Wiklund (4)	Canada (8)	Netherlands (3)	(United States) Mia Manganello
2026–27								

Source: SpeedSkatingStats.com

=== Mixed ===
Season	Mixed Relay
2024–25	Canada
2025–26	Germany
2026–27	

Source: SpeedSkatingStats.com

== Most World Cup victories ==
The skaters with the highest number of individual World Cup victories as of 25 December 2025. Active skaters in bold.

=== Men ===
Pos	Athlete	100 m	500 m	1000 m	1500 m	5000 m	10000 m	Mass start	Total wins
1	(Canada) Jeremy Wotherspoon		**49**	18					67
2	(United States) Shani Davis			**40**	**18**				58
3	(East Germany) (Germany) Uwe-Jens Mey		36	12					48
4	(United States) **Jordan Stolz**		15	16	15			1	47
5	(United States) Dan Jansen		32	14					46
6	(Netherlands) Sven Kramer				3	**34**	5		42
7	(Russia) Pavel Kulizhnikov		24	12					36
8	(Japan) Hiroyasu Shimizu	1	34						35
9	(Norway) Ådne Søndrål		1	11	**18**				30
9	(Soviet Union) (Commonwealth of Independent States) (Belarus) Igor Zhelezovski		4	24	2				30

Source: SpeedSkatingStats.com

=== Women ===
Pos	Athlete	100 m	500 m	1000 m	1500 m	3000 m	5000 m	Mass start	Total wins
1	(East Germany) (Germany) Gunda Niemann-Stirnemann			2	**39**	**42**	**15**		98
2	(United States) Bonnie Blair		39	**27**	3				69
3	(Germany) Jenny Wolf	**12**	**49**						61
4	(Germany) Anni Friesinger			19	26	10	1		56
5	(Czech Republic) Martina Sáblíková				1	35	14	2	52
6	(Japan) Miho Takagi			13	24	1			38
7	(South Korea) Lee Sang-hwa	1	36						37
8	(Germany) Monique Garbrecht-Enfeldt		17	19					36
8	(Netherlands) Ireen Wüst			4	26	6			36
10	(Japan) Nao Kodaira		28	6					34
10	(Canada) Catriona Le May Doan	1	27	6					34
10	(United States) Heather Richardson Bergsma		6	21	7				34

Source: SpeedSkatingStats.com

== All-time medal count ==
Update after 2025–26 ISU Speed Skating World Cup result.

Rank	Nation	Gold	Silver	Bronze	Total
1	Netherlands	659	698	701	2,058
2	United States	433	321	289	1,043
3	Germany	332	275	238	845
4	Japan	309	314	335	958
5	Canada	260	285	272	817
6	Russia	162	172	210	544
7	Norway	134	141	144	419
8	South Korea	121	147	148	416
9	East Germany	121	78	65	264
10	China	94	115	101	310
11	Czech Republic	65	35	26	126
12	Italy	41	52	74	167
13	Austria	29	41	47	117
14	Soviet Union	23	22	34	79
15	Poland	17	39	58	114
16	Finland	16	19	25	60
17	Belarus	14	22	9	45
18	Belgium	13	19	20	52
19	Sweden	10	22	14	46
20	Kazakhstan	5	8	11	24
21	France	5	7	7	19
22	CIS	5	1	1	7
23	New Zealand	2	5	6	13
24	Switzerland	1	4	5	10
25	West Germany	0	5	5	10
26	Latvia	0	3	0	3
27	Chinese Taipei	0	1	0	1
27	Denmark	0	1	0	1
27	Spain	0	1	0	1
30	Estonia	0	0	2	2
31	Australia	0	0	1	1
31	Hungary	0	0	1	1
31	Romania	0	0	1	1
Totals (33 entries)		2,871	2,853	2,850	8,574

== See also ==
- ISU Junior World Cup Speed Skating
- Cup Ranking - Country Medal Table
- World Speed Skating Championships
