= Sophie Muir =

Australian speed skater

Personal information
- Nationality: Australian
- Born: May 7, 1983 (age 43)

Sport
- Sport: Speed skating
- Events: 500m and 1000m

Achievements and titles
- Olympic finals: 2010

Sophie Muir (born 7 May 1983) is an Australian speed skater and a former inline speed skating world champion. Muir was selected in the Australian squad to compete in the Women's 500 metres and Women's 1000 metres, at the 2010 Winter Olympics at Vancouver.
