= Nick Pearson =

American speed skater

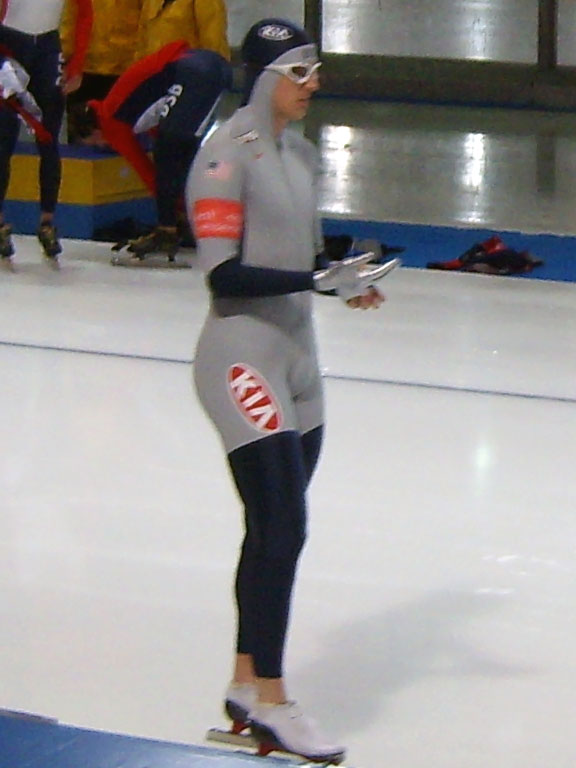

Personal information
- Nationality: American
- Born: Nicholas Otto Pearson; August 13, 1979 (age 46) West Allis, Wisconsin, U.S.
- Height: 6 ft 4 in (193 cm)

Sport
- Country: USA
- Sport: Speed skating

Nick Pearson (born August 13, 1979 in Vernon, Wisconsin) is an American speed skater who has competed since 1997. He was named to the U.S. team for the 2010 Winter Olympics.

Pearson previously competed at the 2002 Winter Olympics in Salt Lake City, finishing sixth in both the 1000 m and 1500 m events. He retired in 2005, but returned in 2008 to compete.

Pearson was a guest on the NPR humorous quiz show Wait Wait...Don't Tell Me! taped on February 16, 2012 at Abravanel Hall in Salt Lake City, Utah and broadcast on February 18, 2012. Pearson got one of three questions correct.
