= 2009–10 ISU Speed Skating World Cup – World Cup 3 =

The third competition weekend of the 2009–10 ISU Speed Skating World Cup was held in the Vikingskipet, Hamar, Norway, from Saturday, 21 November, until Sunday, 22 November 2009.

== Schedule of events ==
The schedule of the event is below.

Date	Time	Events
21 November	13:00 CET	1500 m men 5000 m women
22 November	14:00 CET	1500 m women 10000 m men

== Medal summary ==
=== Men's events ===
Event	Gold	Time	Silver	Time	Bronze	Time	Report
1500 m	Shani Davis; United States	1:44.27	Lucas Makowsky; Canada	1:45.40	Håvard Bøkko; Norway	1:45.61	
10000 m	Sven Kramer; Netherlands	12:50.96	Bob de Jong; Netherlands	12:54.97	Ivan Skobrev; Russia	13:01.41	

=== Women's events ===
Event	Gold	Time	Silver	Time	Bronze	Time	Report
1500 m	Kristina Groves; Canada	1:55.16	Ireen Wüst; Netherlands	1:55.95	Martina Sáblíková; Czech Republic	1:56.34	
5000 m	Martina Sáblíková; Czech Republic	6:50.07	Stephanie Beckert; Germany	6:52.79	Daniela Anschütz-Thoms; Germany	6:59.62	
