= Rebekah Bradford =

American speed skater

Rebekah Bradford OLY (born April 30, 1983, in Apple Valley, Minnesota) is an American speed skater who has competed since 2002. She was named to the U.S. team for the 2010 Winter Olympics.

Rebekah graduated from Apple Valley High School in 2001.
