= 2009–10 ISU Speed Skating World Cup – World Cup 1 =

The first competition weekend of the 2009–10 ISU Speed Skating World Cup was held in the Sportforum Hohenschönhausen in Berlin, Germany, from Friday, 6 November, until Sunday, 8 November 2009.

== Schedule of events ==
The schedule of the event is below.

Date	Time	Events
6 November	17:00 CET	500 m men 3000 m women 1000 m men
7 November	14:00 CET	500 m women 5000 m men 1000 m women
8 November	14:00 CET	500 m women 500 m men 1500 m women 1500 m men

== Medal summary ==
=== Men's events ===
Event	Race #	Gold	Time	Silver	Time	Bronze	Time	Report
500 m	1	Lee Kang-seok; South Korea	34.80	Lee Kyou-hyuk; South Korea	35.02	Keiichiro Nagashima; Japan	35.13	
500 m	2	Tucker Fredricks; United States	35.06	Lee Kang-seok; South Korea	35.10	Lee Kyou-hyuk; South Korea	35.10	
1000 m		Shani Davis; United States	1:08.53	Yevgeny Lalenkov; Russia	1:09.11	Mun Jun; South Korea	1:09.43	
1500 m		Shani Davis; United States	1:44.47	Håvard Bøkko; Norway	1:45.56	Denny Morrison; Canada	1:45.69	
5000 m		Sven Kramer; Netherlands	6:14.69	Håvard Bøkko; Norway	6:17.17	Bob de Jong; Netherlands	6:19.22	

=== Women's events ===
Event	Race #	Gold	Time	Silver	Time	Bronze	Time	Report
500 m	1	Wang Beixing; China	37.85	Jenny Wolf; Germany	38.04	Nao Kodaira; Japan	38.19	
500 m	2	Jenny Wolf; Germany	37.52	Wang Beixing; China	37.94	Annette Gerritsen; Netherlands	38.27	
1000 m		Christine Nesbitt; Canada	1:15.41	Nao Kodaira; Japan	1:15.92	Marianne Timmer; Netherlands	1:16.13	
1500 m		Christine Nesbitt; Canada	1:55.54	Martina Sáblíková; Czech Republic	1:56.99	Brittany Schussler; Canada	1:57.26	
3000 m		Martina Sáblíková; Czech Republic	4:00.75	Masako Hozumi; Japan	4:06.25	Stephanie Beckert; Germany	4:07.17	
