= 2009–10 ISU Speed Skating World Cup – World Cup 2 =

The second competition weekend of the 2009–10 ISU Speed Skating World Cup was held in Thialf, Heerenveen, Netherlands, from Friday, 13 November, until Sunday, 15 November 2009.

== Schedule of events ==
The schedule of the event is below.

Date	Time	Events
13 November	16:00 CET	500 m women 500 m men 3000 m women 1500 m men
14 November	13:45 CET	500 m women 500 m men 1500 m women 5000 m men
15 November	13:00 CET	1000 m women 1000 m men Team pursuit women Team pursuit men

== Medal summary ==
=== Men's events ===
Event	Race #	Gold	Time	Silver	Time	Bronze	Time	Report
500 m	1	Keiichiro Nagashima; Japan	34.98	Tucker Fredricks; United States	35.00	Ronald Mulder; Netherlands	35.07	
500 m	2	Joji Kato; Japan	34.98	Jan Smeekens; Netherlands	35.02	Lee Kang-seok; South Korea	35.13	
1000 m		Shani Davis; United States	1:08.48	Simon Kuipers; Netherlands	1:09.06	Mo Tae-bum; South Korea	1:09.11	
1500 m		Shani Davis; United States	1:44.48	Håvard Bøkko; Norway	1:45.57	Stefan Groothuis; Netherlands	1:45.74	
5000 m		Sven Kramer; Netherlands	6:16.29	Bob de Jong; Netherlands	6:16.38	Håvard Bøkko; Norway	6:17.10	
Team pursuit		United States; Shani Davis; Chad Hedrick; Trevor Marsicano; Netherlands; Jan Blokhuijsen; Remco olde Heuvel; Koen Verweij	3:43.94			Italy; Matteo Anesi; Enrico Fabris; Luca Stefani	3:45.62	

=== Women's events ===
Event	Race #	Gold	Time	Silver	Time	Bronze	Time	Report
500 m	1	Jenny Wolf; Germany	37.92	Wang Beixing; China	38.19	Annette Gerritsen; Netherlands	38.23	
500 m	2	Jenny Wolf; Germany	37.83	Wang Beixing; China	38.07	Annette Gerritsen; Netherlands	38.18	
1000 m		Christine Nesbitt; Canada	1:15.47	Annette Gerritsen; Netherlands	1:16.03	Natasja Bruintjes; Netherlands	1:16.08	
1500 m		Ireen Wüst; Netherlands	1:56.69	Christine Nesbitt; Canada	1:56.74	Kristina Groves; Canada	1:57.05	
3000 m		Stephanie Beckert; Germany	4:05.29	Martina Sáblíková; Czech Republic	4:05.68	Daniela Anschütz-Thoms; Germany	4:05.73	
Team pursuit		Canada; Kristina Groves; Christine Nesbitt; Brittany Schussler	3:00.39	Netherlands; Diane Valkenburg; Elma de Vries; Ireen Wüst	3:02.12	Russia; Yekaterina Abramova; Galina Likhachova; Yekaterina Shikhova	3:02.40	
