= 2009–10 ISU Speed Skating World Cup – World Cup 7 =

The seventh and final competition weekend of the 2009–10 ISU Speed Skating World Cup was held in Thialf, Heerenveen, Netherlands, from Friday, 12 March, until Sunday, 14 March 2010.

== Schedule of events ==
The schedule of the event is below.

Date	Time	Events
12 March	15:00 UTC+1	500 m women 500 m men 1500 m men 3000 m women
13 March	13:00 UTC+1	500 m women 500 m men 1500 m women 5000 m men
14 March	13:30 UTC+1	1000 m women 1000 m men Team pursuit

== Medal summary ==
=== Men's events ===
Event	Race #	Gold	Time	Silver	Time	Bronze	Time	Report
500 m	1	Jan Smeekens; Netherlands	34.99	Tucker Fredricks; United States	35.01	Ronald Mulder; Netherlands	35.24	
500 m	2	Jan Smeekens; Netherlands	35.05	Ronald Mulder; Netherlands	35.19	Akio Ohta; Japan	35.35	
1000 m		Shani Davis; United States	1:08.89	Stefan Groothuis; Netherlands	1:09.07	Mark Tuitert; Netherlands	1:09.13	
1500 m		Shani Davis; United States	1:45.20	Denny Morrison; Canada	1:46.12	Kjeld Nuis; Netherlands	1:46.61	
5000 m		Håvard Bøkko; Norway	6:20.52	Sverre Haugli; Norway	6:21.69	Ivan Skobrev; Russia	6:23.24	
Team pursuit		Norway; Håvard Bøkko; Henrik Christiansen; Mikael Flygind Larsen	3:42.77	Canada; Mathieu Giroux; Denny Morrison; Lucas Makowsky	3:44.30	United States; Ryan Bedford; Shani Davis; Jonathan Kuck	3:45.70	

=== Women's events ===
Event	Race #	Gold	Time	Silver	Time	Bronze	Time	Report
500 m	1	Jenny Wolf; Germany	38.18	Margot Boer; Netherlands	38.22	Annette Gerritsen; Netherlands	38.67	
500 m	2	Jenny Wolf; Germany	37.96	Annette Gerritsen; Netherlands	38.32	Margot Boer; Netherlands	38.41	
1000 m		Yekaterina Shikhova; Russia	1:16.25	Annette Gerritsen; Netherlands	1:16.35	Natasja Bruintjes; Netherlands	1:16.60	
1500 m		Kristina Groves; Canada	1:58.15	Martina Sáblíková; Czech Republic	1:58.27	Brittany Schussler; Canada	1:58.60	
3000 m		Martina Sáblíková; Czech Republic	4:06.25	Daniela Anschütz-Thoms; Germany	4:06.54	Stephanie Beckert; Germany	4:07.57	
Team pursuit		Canada; Kristina Groves; Cindy Klassen; Brittany Schussler	3:02.05	Germany; Stephanie Beckert; Anni Friesinger-Postma; Katrin Mattscherodt	3:03.43	Japan; Masako Hozumi; Nao Kodaira; Maki Tabata	3:04.58	
