= 2009–10 ISU Speed Skating World Cup – World Cup 4 =

The fourth competition weekend of the 2009–10 ISU Speed Skating World Cup was held in the Olympic Oval, Calgary, Canada, from Friday, 4 December, until Sunday, 6 December 2009.

In the women's team pursuit event, Canada's team, comprised by Kristina Groves, Christine Nesbitt and Brittany Schussler, set a new world record of 2:55.79.

== Schedule of events ==
The schedule of the event is below.

Date	Time	Events
4 December	12:30	500 m women 500 m men 3000 m women 1500 m men
5 December	12:30	500 m women 500 m men 1500 m women 5000 m men
6 December	12:30	1000 m women 1000 m men Team pursuit women Team pursuit men

== Medal summary ==
=== Men's events ===
Event	Race #	Gold	Time	Silver	Time	Bronze	Time	Report
500 m	1	Mika Poutala; Finland	34.38	Joji Kato; Japan	34.45	Jamie Gregg; Canada	34.45	
500 m	2	Lee Kyou-hyuk; South Korea	34.28	Mika Poutala; Finland	34.38	Tucker Fredricks; United States	34.50	
1000 m		Shani Davis; United States	1:06.91	Lee Kyou-hyuk; South Korea	1:07.61	Denny Morrison; Canada	1:07.77	
1500 m		Chad Hedrick; United States	1:42.14	Shani Davis; United States	1:42.19	Denny Morrison; Canada	1:42.74	
5000 m		Sven Kramer; Netherlands	6:11.11	Ivan Skobrev; Russia	6:13.19	Bob de Jong; Netherlands	6:13.80	
Team pursuit		Netherlands; Sven Kramer; Carl Verheijen; Wouter olde Heuvel	3:38.05	Canada; Denny Morrison; Lucas Makowsky; Mathieu Giroux	3:39.17	Norway; Håvard Bøkko; Sverre Lunde Pedersen; Fredrik van der Horst	3:41.59	

=== Women's events ===
Event	Race #	Gold	Time	Silver	Time	Bronze	Time	Report
500 m	1	Jenny Wolf; Germany	37.33	Wang Beixing; China; Lee Sang-hwa; South Korea	37.34			
500 m	2	Jenny Wolf; Germany	37.21	Wang Beixing; China	37.60	Lee Sang-hwa; South Korea	37.64	
1000 m		Christine Nesbitt; Canada	1:14.03	Annette Gerritsen; Netherlands	1:14.48	Monique Angermüller; Germany	1:14.68	
1500 m		Kristina Groves; Canada	1:54.35	Christine Nesbitt; Canada	1:54.43	Elma de Vries; Netherlands	1:54.55	
3000 m		Stephanie Beckert; Germany	3:56.80	Martina Sáblíková; Czech Republic	3:56.83	Daniela Anschütz-Thoms; Germany	3:58.07	
Team pursuit		Canada; Kristina Groves; Christine Nesbitt; Brittany Schussler	2:55.79; WR	Japan; Masako Hozumi; Maki Tabata; Shiho Ishizawa	2:59.79	Germany; Isabell Ost; Stephanie Beckert; Katrin Mattscherodt	3:00.25	
