= Monique Angermüller =

German speed skater

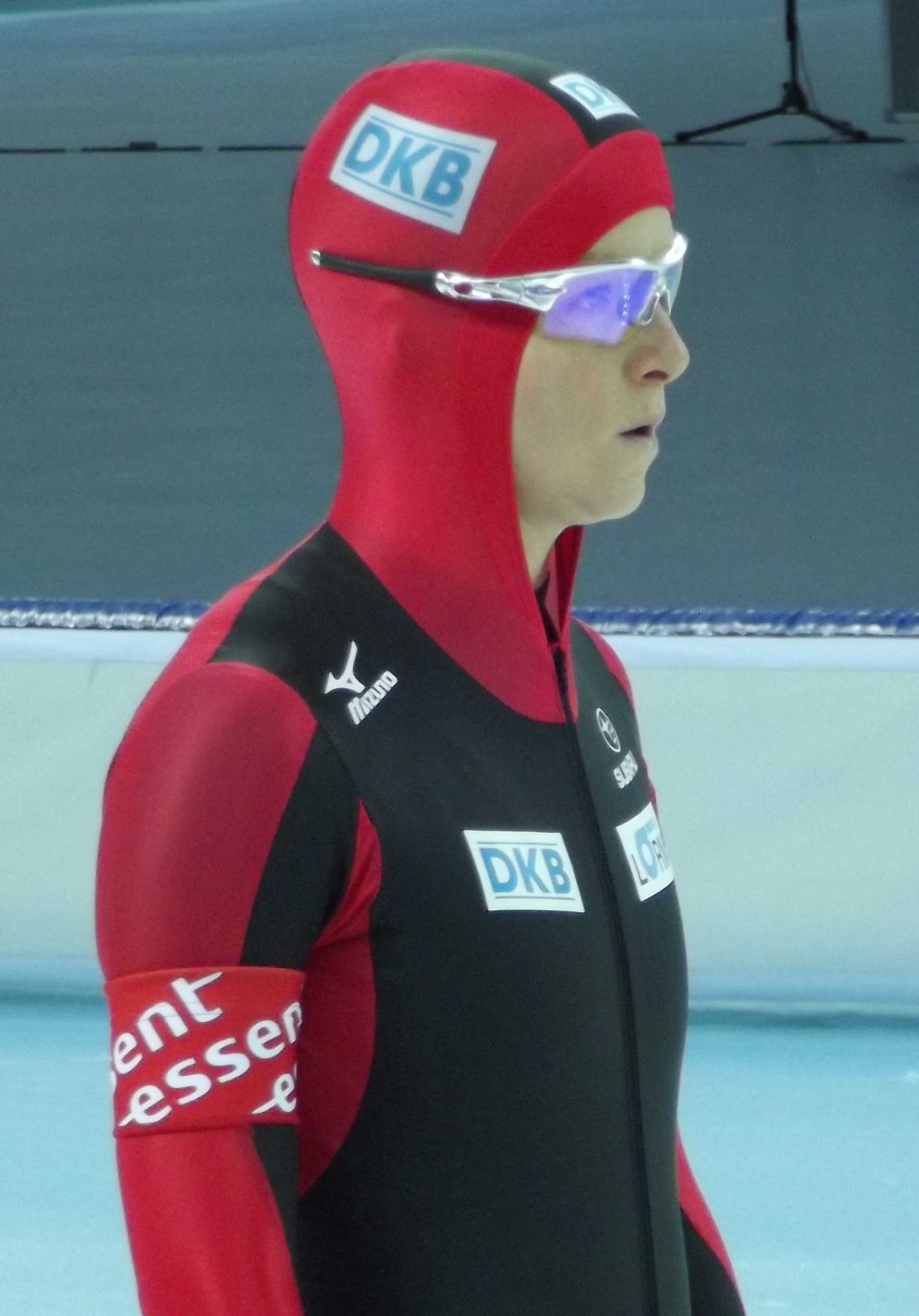
- Angermüller in 2013

Personal information
- Born: 27 January 1984 (age 42) Berlin, East Germany

Sport
- Country: Germany
- Sport: Speed skating

Monique Angermüller (born 27 January 1984) is a retired German speed skater who represented Germany at the 2010 Winter Olympics. She participated in the 500, 1000, and 1500 metres distances. Her specialty is considered to be the 1000 m.
