= 2009–10 ISU Speed Skating World Cup – World Cup 5 =

The fifth competition weekend of the 2009–10 ISU Speed Skating World Cup was held at the Utah Olympic Oval, Salt Lake City, United States, from Friday, December 11, until Sunday, December 13, 2009.

World records were set by American Shani Davis on the men's 1500 metres, and by Germany's Jenny Wolf on the women's 500 metres.

== Schedule of events ==
The schedule of the event is below.

Date	Time	Events
December 11	12:30	500 m women 500 m men 3000 m women 1500 m men
December 12	12:30	500 m women 500 m men 1500 m women 5000 m men
December 13	12:30	1000 m women 1000 m men Team pursuit women Team pursuit men

== Medal summary ==
=== Men's events ===
Event	Race #	Gold	Time	Silver	Time	Bronze	Time	Report
500 m	1	Lee Kyou-hyuk; South Korea	34.26	Yuya Oikawa; Japan	34.27	Mika Poutala; Finland	34.31	
500 m	2	Lee Kyou-hyuk; South Korea	34.26	Lee Kang-seok; South Korea	34.28	Tucker Fredricks; United States	34.35	
1000 m		Shani Davis; United States	1:06.67	Lee Kyou-hyuk; South Korea	1:07.07	Mika Poutala; Finland	1:07.24	
1500 m		Shani Davis; United States	1:41.04; WR	Chad Hedrick; United States	1:42.19	Mo Tae-bum; South Korea	1:42.85	
5000 m		Enrico Fabris; Italy	6:06.06	Bob de Jong; Netherlands	6:08.76	Ivan Skobrev; Russia	6:10.58	
Team pursuit		Norway; Håvard Bøkko; Mikael Flygind-Larsen; Henrik Christiansen	3:39.55	Italy; Matteo Anesi; Enrico Fabris; Luca Stefani	3:39.72	Canada; Steven Elm; Lucas Makowsky; Mathieu Giroux	3:40.34	

=== Women's events ===
Event	Race #	Gold	Time	Silver	Time	Bronze	Time	Report
500 m	1	Jenny Wolf; Germany	37.00; WR	Wang Beixing; China	37.14	Lee Sang-hwa; South Korea	37.24	
500 m	2	Wang Beixing; China	37.02	Jenny Wolf; Germany	37.17	Lee Sang-hwa; South Korea	37.24	
1000 m		Christine Nesbitt; Canada	1:13.36	Wang Beixing; China	1:14.01	Nao Kodaira; Japan	1:14.17	
1500 m		Christine Nesbitt; Canada	1:52.76	Kristina Groves; Canada	1:53.32	Jennifer Rodriguez; United States	1:54.19	
3000 m		Martina Sáblíková; Czech Republic	3:56.29	Stephanie Beckert; Germany	3:57.78	Kristina Groves; Canada	3:58.67	
Team pursuit		Russia; Yekaterina Abramova; Galina Likhachova; Yekaterina Shikhova	2:57.18	Canada; Kristina Groves; Christine Nesbitt; Cindy Klassen	2:57.35	Germany; Daniela Anschütz-Thoms; Stephanie Beckert; Katrin Mattscherodt	2:57.36	
