= Yekaterina Shikhova =

Russian speed skater

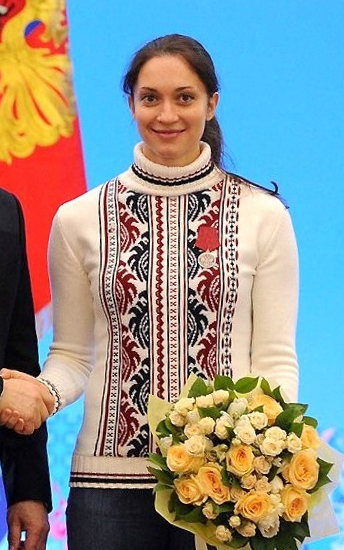
- Shikhova in 2014

Personal information
- Born: 25 June 1985 (age 41) Kirov, Soviet Union
- Height: 172 cm (5 ft 8 in)
- Weight: 63 kg (139 lb)

Sport
- Country: Russia
- Sport: Speed skating
Medal record
Olympic Games
Bronze medal – third place	2014 Sochi	Team pursuit
World Allround Championships
Bronze medal – third place	2013 Hamar	Allround
World Single Distance Championships
Bronze medal – third place	2017 Gangneung	Team pursuit
ISU World Cup
Gold medal – first place	2017–18 Season	1000 m
Bronze medal – third place	2017–18 Season	1500 m
European Single Distance Championships
Gold medal – first place	2018 Kolomna	1000 m
Silver medal – second place	2018 Kolomna	1500 m
Silver medal – second place	2018 Kolomna	Team pursuit
Silver medal – second place	2020 Heerenveen	1000 m
Bronze medal – third place	2020 Heerenveen	1500 m

Yekaterina Vladimirovna Shikhova (Russian: Екатерина Владимировна Шихова; born 25 June 1985) is a Russian speed skater. She won a team bronze medal at the 2014 Winter Olympics, and an individual allround bronze medal at the 2013 World Championships.

== Winter Olympics ==
At the 2010 Winter Olympics, Shikhova competed in two individual and one team events. In her first event, the 1000 m, she finished 11th with a time of 1:17.46. In her second event, the 1500 m, she placed 8th with a time of 1:58.54. Her pursuit team finished seventh.

At the 2014 Olympics Shikhova added 3000 m to her previous three events. She won a bronze medal with the pursuit team, and placed 10th–20th individually.

== Personal records ==
Personal records
Women's speed skating
Event	Result	Date	Location	Notes
500 m	38.11	25 February 2017	Olympic Oval, Calgary	
1000 m	1:12.46	9 March 2019	Utah Olympic Oval, Salt Lake City	
1500 m	1:50.63	10 March 2019	Utah Olympic Oval, Salt Lake City	
3000 m	4:07.36	25 November 2012	Kolomna Speed Skating Center, Kolomna	
5000 m	7:16.48	17 February 2013	Vikingskipet, Hamar	

She is currently in 33rd position in the adelskalender.

== World Cup podiums ==
Date	Season	Location	Rank	Event
9 November 2008	2008–09	Erfurt	2nd place, silver medalist(s)	Team pursuit
15 November 2009	2009–10	Heerenveen	3rd place, bronze medalist(s)	Team pursuit
13 December 2009	2009–10	Salt Lake City	1st place, gold medalist(s)	Team pursuit
7 March 2010	2009–10	Erfurt	1st place, gold medalist(s)	1000 m
14 March 2010	2009–10	Heerenveen (Final)	1st place, gold medalist(s)	1000 m
20 November 2011	2011–12	Chelyabinsk	3rd place, bronze medalist(s)	Team pursuit
3 December 2011	2011–12	Heerenveen	2nd place, silver medalist(s)	1500 m
4 December 2011	2011–12	Heerenveen	3rd place, bronze medalist(s)	1000 m
4 December 2011	2011–12	Heerenveen	2nd place, silver medalist(s)	Team pursuit
12 February 2012	2011–12	Hamar	1st place, gold medalist(s)	Team pursuit
11 March 2012	2011–12	Berlin	3rd place, bronze medalist(s)	Team pursuit
24 November 2012	2012–13	Kolomna	2nd place, silver medalist(s)	1500 m
9 February 2013	2012–13	Inzell	3rd place, bronze medalist(s)	1500 m
22 November 2015	2015–16	Salt Lake City	2nd place, silver medalist(s)	Team sprint
11 December 2015	2015–16	Heerenveen	2nd place, silver medalist(s)	Team sprint
19 November 2016	2016–17	Nagano	2nd place, silver medalist(s)	Team sprint
2 December 2017	2017–18	Calgary	2nd place, silver medalist(s)	1000 m
3 December 2017	2017–18	Calgary	3rd place, bronze medalist(s)	1500 m
9 December 2017	2017–18	Salt Lake City	3rd place, bronze medalist(s)	1500 m
10 December 2017	2017–18	Salt Lake City	3rd place, bronze medalist(s)	1000 m
19 January 2018	2017–18	Erfurt	3rd place, bronze medalist(s)	1000 m
21 January 2018	2017–18	Erfurt	3rd place, bronze medalist(s)	1500 m
17 March 2018	2017–18	Minsk	3rd place, bronze medalist(s)	1000 m
17 November 2018	2018–19	Obihiro	3rd place, bronze medalist(s)	1500 m
18 November 2018	2018–19	Obihiro	1st place, gold medalist(s)	Team sprint
15 December 2018	2018–19	Heerenveen	3rd place, bronze medalist(s)	1500 m
16 December 2018	2018–19	Heerenveen	3rd place, bronze medalist(s)	1000 m
16 November 2019	2019–20	Minsk	2nd place, silver medalist(s)	1500 m
17 November 2019	2019–20	Minsk	3rd place, bronze medalist(s)	1000 m
23 November 2019	2019–20	Tomaszów Mazowiecki	1st place, gold medalist(s)	Team pursuit
7 February 2020	2019–20	Calgary	3rd place, bronze medalist(s)	1000 m
