= Jenny Wolf =

German speed skater

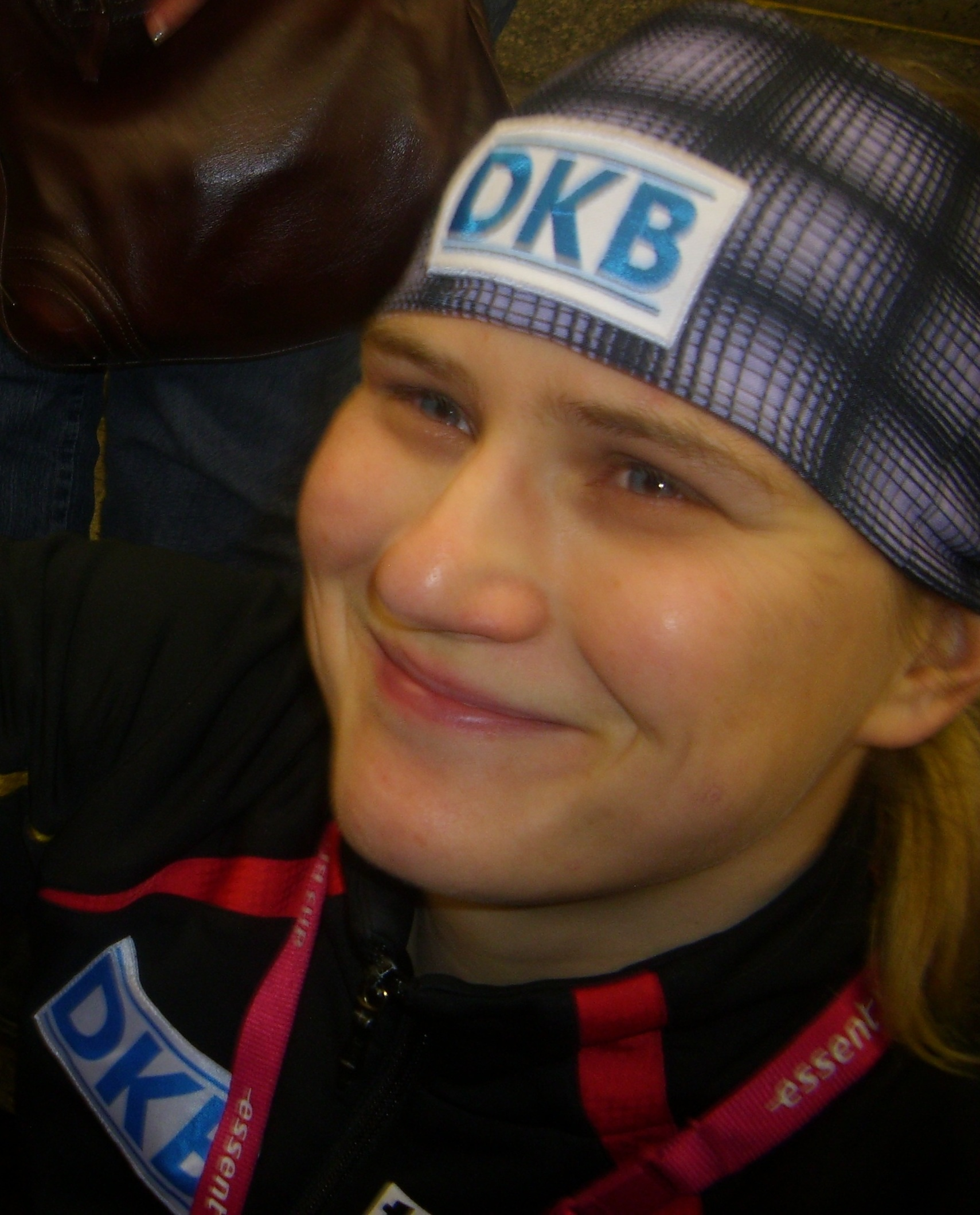

Personal information
- Born: 31 January 1979 (age 47) East Berlin, East Germany
- Height: 1.72 m (5 ft 8 in)
- Weight: 72 kg (159 lb)

Sport
- Country: Germany
- Sport: Speed skating
- Retired: 2014
Medal record
Women's speed skating
Representing Germany
Olympic Games
Silver medal – second place	2010 Vancouver	500 m
World Sprint Championships
Gold medal – first place	2008 Heerenveen	Sprint
Silver medal – second place	2009 Moscow	Sprint
Bronze medal – third place	2010 Obihiro	Sprint
World Single Distance Championships
Gold medal – first place	2007 Salt Lake City	500 m
Gold medal – first place	2008 Nagano	500 m
Gold medal – first place	2009 Vancouver	500 m
Gold medal – first place	2011 Inzell	500 m

Jenny Wolf (born 31 January 1979) is a former German speed skater. On 10 March 2007 at the ISU World Single Distances Speed Skating Championships in Salt Lake City, Utah, she broke the world record for the women's 500 m in her second race. She finished sixth on the 500 m at the 2006 Winter Olympics of Turin, and tenth on the same distance in 2002.

Wolf won the Speed Skating World Cup in the 2005–06 season on the 500 m. Her favorite distance is the 100 m, but this is not an Olympic event.

Wolf won the silver medal at the 500 m at the 2010 Winter Olympics in Vancouver, five hundredths of a second after South Korean Lee Sang-hwa over two races. Wolf was the world record holder in the event at the time.

On 13 November 2010, Wolf won her 40th 500 m World Cup race, thereby breaking Bonnie Blair's record, who won 39 World Cup races on that distance.

Records
Preceded by (Canada) Catriona Le May Doan	Women's 500 m speed skating world record 10 March 2007 – 29 January 2012	Succeeded by (China) Yu Jing
Preceded by (Canada) Catriona Le May Doan	Women's 2 x 500 m speed skating world record 10 March 2007 – 28 December 2013	Succeeded by (United States) Heather Richardson
