= 2009–10 ISU Speed Skating World Cup =

International speed skating competition

ISU Speed Skating World Cup
- Dates: 6 November 2009 – 14 March 2010

The 2009–10 ISU Speed Skating World Cup, officially the Essent ISU World Cup Speed Skating 2009–2010, was a series of international speed skating competitions which ran the entire season. The season started on 6 November 2009 in Berlin, Germany, and ended on 14 March 2010 in Heerenveen, Netherlands. Compared to previous seasons, fewer competition weekends were held; the season was restricted due to the 2010 Winter Olympics, which were arranged in Vancouver, Canada, during February 2010. In total, seven competition weekends were held at six different locations, ten cups were contested (five for men, and five for women), and 70 races took place.

The World Cup is organized by the International Skating Union (ISU).

== Calendar ==
WC #	City	Venue	Date	500 m	1000 m	1500 m	3000 m	5000 m	10000 m	Team pursuit
1	Berlin	Sportforum Hohenschönhausen	6–8 November	2m, 2w	m, w	m, w	w	m		
2	Heerenveen	Thialf	13–15 November	2m, 2w	m, w	m, w	w	m		m, w
3	Hamar	Vikingskipet	21–22 November			m, w		w	m	
4	Calgary	Olympic Oval	4–6 December	2m, 2w	m, w	m, w	w	m		m, w
5	Salt Lake City	Utah Olympic Oval	11–13 December	2m, 2w	m, w	m, w	w	m		m, w
	Obihiro	Meiji Hokkaido-Tokachi Oval	9–10 January	2010 Asian Speed Skating Championships						
	Hamar	Vikingskipet	9–10 January	2010 European Speed Skating Championships						
	Obihiro	Meiji Hokkaido-Tokachi Oval	16–17 January	2010 World Sprint Speed Skating Championships						
	Vancouver	Richmond Olympic Oval	13–27 February	Speed skating at the 2010 Winter Olympics						
6	Erfurt	Gunda-Niemann-Stirnemann-Halle	6–7 March	2m, 2w	2m, 2w					
7	Heerenveen	Thialf	12–14 March	2m, 2w	m, w	m, w	w	m		m, w
	Heerenveen	Thialf	19–21 March	2010 World Allround Speed Skating Championships						
Total				12m, 12w	7m, 7w	6m, 6w	5w	5m, 1w	1m	4m, 4w

Note: the men's 5000 and 10000 metres were contested as one cup, and the women's 3000 and 5000 metres were contested as one cup, as indicated by the color coding.

== World records ==
World records going into the 2009–10 season.

=== Men ===
Distance	Time	Nat.	Holder	Date	Venue	Reference
500 m	34.03	(Canada)	Jeremy Wotherspoon	9 November 2007	Utah Olympic Oval, Salt Lake City	
1000 m	1:06.42	(United States)	Shani Davis	7 March 2009	Utah Olympic Oval, Salt Lake City	
1500 m	1:41.80	(United States)	Shani Davis	6 March 2009	Utah Olympic Oval, Salt Lake City	
5000 m	6:03.32	(Netherlands)	Sven Kramer	17 November 2007	Olympic Oval, Calgary	
10000 m	12:41.69	(Netherlands)	Sven Kramer	10 March 2007	Utah Olympic Oval, Salt Lake City	
Team pursuit (8 laps)	3:37.80	(Netherlands)	Sven Kramer; Carl Verheijen; Erben Wennemars	11 March 2007	Utah Olympic Oval, Salt Lake City	

At the World Cup stop in Salt Lake City on 11 December 2009, Shani Davis of the United States set a new world record on the men's 1500 metres with a time of 1:41.04.

=== Women ===
Distance	Time	Nat.	Holder	Date	Venue	Reference
500 m	37.02	(Germany)	Jenny Wolf	16 November 2007	Olympic Oval, Calgary	
1000 m	1:13.11	(Canada)	Cindy Klassen	25 March 2006	Olympic Oval, Calgary	
1500 m	1:51.79	(Canada)	Cindy Klassen	20 November 2005	Utah Olympic Oval, Salt Lake City	
3000 m	3:53.34	(Canada)	Cindy Klassen	18 March 2006	Olympic Oval, Calgary	
5000 m	6:45.61	(Czech Republic)	Martina Sáblíková	11 March 2007	Utah Olympic Oval, Salt Lake City	
Team pursuit (6 laps)	2:56.04	(Germany)	Daniela Anschütz-Thoms; Anni Friesinger; Claudia Pechstein	12 November 2005	Olympic Oval, Calgary	

At the World Cup stop in Calgary on 6 December 2009, the Canadian team – consisting of Kristina Groves, Christine Nesbitt and Brittany Schussler – set a new world record on the women's team pursuit with a time of 2:55.79.

At the World Cup stop in Salt Lake City on 11 December 2009, Jenny Wolf of Germany set a new world record on the women's 500 metres with a time of 37.00 seconds.

== Men's standings ==
=== 500 m ===
Rank	Name	Points
1	(United States) Tucker Fredricks	788
2	(Netherlands) Jan Smeekens	742
3	(Finland) Mika Poutala	702

=== 1000 m ===
Rank	Name	Points
1	(United States) Shani Davis	750
2	(Netherlands) Mark Tuitert	425
3	(Netherlands) Stefan Groothuis	355

=== 1500 m ===
Rank	Name	Points
1	(United States) Shani Davis	630
2	(Norway) Håvard Bøkko	395
3	(Canada) Denny Morrison	338

=== 5000 and 10000 m ===
Rank	Name	Points
1	(Norway) Håvard Bøkko	455
2	(Russia) Ivan Skobrev	430
3	(Netherlands) Bob de Jong	416

=== Team pursuit ===
Rank	Name	Points
1	Norway	380
2	Netherlands	350
3	Canada	306

== Women's standings ==
=== 500 m ===
Rank	Name	Points
1	(Germany) Jenny Wolf	1260
2	(Netherlands) Margot Boer	700
3	(China) Wang Beixing	680

=== 1000 m ===
Rank	Name	Points
1	(Canada) Christine Nesbitt	472
2	(Netherlands) Margot Boer	395
3	(Germany) Monique Angermüller	351

=== 1500 m ===
Rank	Name	Points
1	(Canada) Kristina Groves	560
2	(Canada) Christine Nesbitt	374
3	(Czech Republic) Martina Sáblíková	348

=== 3000 and 5000 m ===
Rank	Name	Points
1	(Czech Republic) Martina Sáblíková	610
2	(Germany) Stephanie Beckert	535
3	(Germany) Daniela Anschütz-Thoms	435

=== Team pursuit ===
Rank	Name	Points
1	Canada	430
2	Russia	320
3	Germany	310
