= Shani Davis =

American speed skater

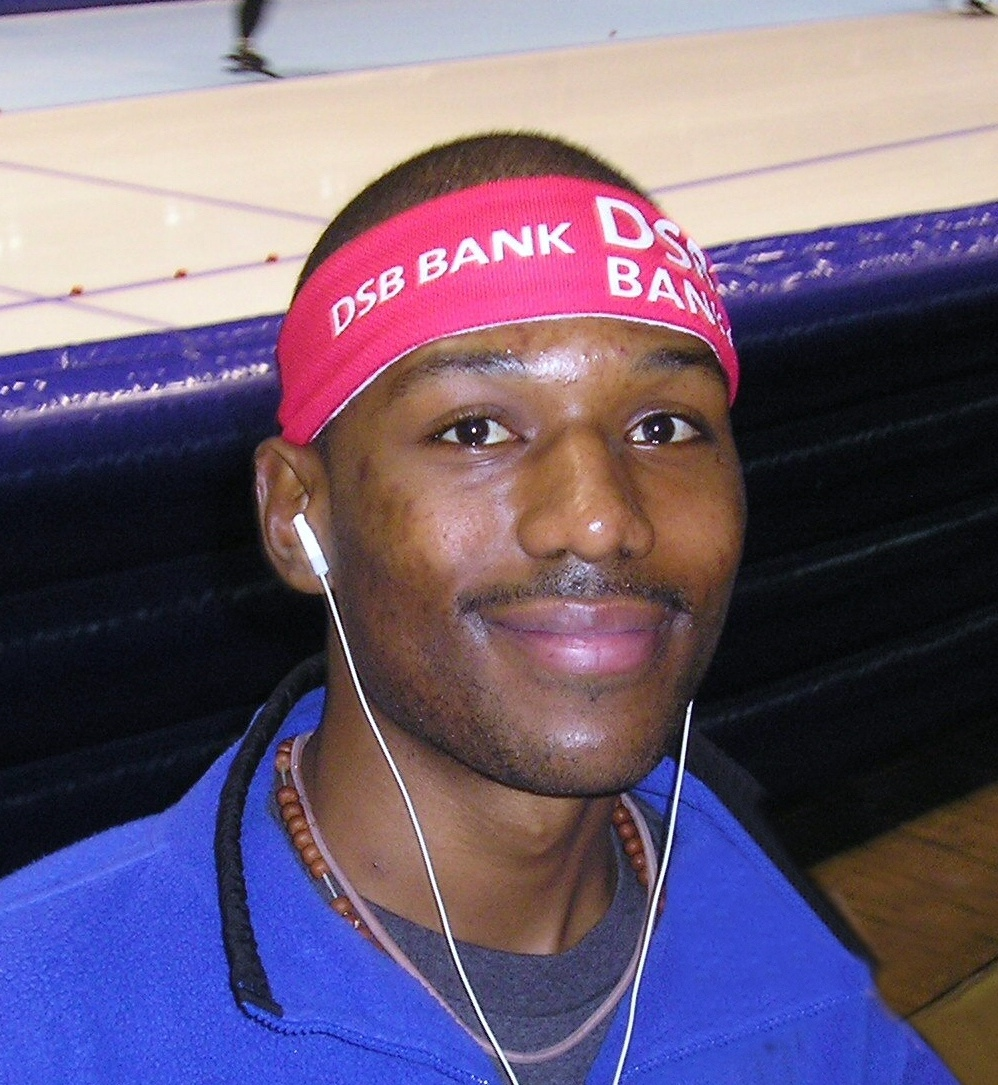
- Davis in 2006

Personal information
- Full name: Shani Earl Davis
- Born: August 13, 1982 (age 44) Chicago, Illinois, U.S.
- Education: Northern Michigan University
- Height: 6 ft 2 in (188 cm)
- Weight: 190 lb (86 kg)
- Website: shanidavis.org

Sport
- Country: United States
- Sport: Speed skating
Medal record
Men's speed skating
Representing the United States
Event	1st	2nd	3rd
Olympic Games	2	2	0
World Allround Championships	2	1	1
World Sprint Championships	1	1	2
World Single Distance Championships	8	4	3
World Short Track Championships	0	0	1
Total	13	8	7
Olympic Games
Gold medal – first place	2006 Turin	1000 m
Gold medal – first place	2010 Vancouver	1000 m
Silver medal – second place	2006 Turin	1500 m
Silver medal – second place	2010 Vancouver	1500 m
World Allround Championships
Gold medal – first place	2005 Moscow	Allround
Gold medal – first place	2006 Calgary	Allround
Silver medal – second place	2004 Hamar	Allround
Bronze medal – third place	2008 Berlin	Allround
World Sprint Championships
Gold medal – first place	2009 Moscow	Sprint
Silver medal – second place	2014 Nagano	Sprint
Bronze medal – third place	2007 Hamar	Sprint
Bronze medal – third place	2011 Heerenveen	Sprint
World Single Distance Championships
Gold medal – first place	2004 Seoul	1500 m
Gold medal – first place	2007 Salt Lake City	1000 m
Gold medal – first place	2007 Salt Lake City	1500 m
Gold medal – first place	2008 Nagano	1000 m
Gold medal – first place	2009 Vancouver	1500 m
Gold medal – first place	2011 Inzell	1000 m
Gold medal – first place	2011 Inzell	Team pursuit
Gold medal – first place	2015 Heerenveen	1000 m
Silver medal – second place	2008 Nagano	1500 m
Silver medal – second place	2011 Inzell	1500 m
Silver medal – second place	2012 Heerenveen	Team pursuit
Silver medal – second place	2013 Sochi	1500 m
Bronze medal – third place	2009 Vancouver	1000 m
Bronze medal – third place	2012 Heerenveen	1000 m
Bronze medal – third place	2013 Sochi	1000 m
Men's short track speed skating
World Championships
Bronze medal – third place	2005 Beijing	5000 m relay

Shani Earl Davis (/ˈʃɑːni/; born August 13, 1982) is an American former speed skater. At the 2006 Winter Olympics in Turin, Italy, Davis won a gold medal in an individual event at the Winter Olympic Games, winning the speedskating 1000 meter event. He also won a silver medal in the 1500 meter event. At the 2010 Winter Olympics in Vancouver, British Columbia, Canada, he repeated the feat, becoming the first man to successfully defend the 1000 meters and repeating as the 1500 meter silver medalist.

Davis won the silver medal at the 2004 World Allround Speed Skating Championships. He then proceeded to win the World Allround Championships in both 2005 and 2006. In 2009, he won the World Sprint Championships in Moscow, the site of his first World Allround Championship victory. When Davis won those events, he became the second male skater to win both the Sprint and Allround in his career, after Eric Heiden. He has won six World Single Distance Championships titles, three at 1500 meters (in 2004, 2007 and 2009) and three at 1000 meters (in 2007, 2008 and 2011), and he led the United States to its first and only World Championship gold medal in the Team Pursuit event in 2011. He has won ten career Overall World Cup titles, six at 1000 meters (in 2006, 2008–10, 2012, 2014) and four at 1500 meters (2008–2011). Davis also earned the title of Grand World Cup Champion for the 2013–14 season, earning the most points across all distances. His 58 career individual victories on the ISU Speed Skating World Cup circuit (through March 2014) place him second all-time among men.

Davis has set a total of nine world records. He held the top spot on the world Adelskalender list after taking the lead from Sven Kramer in March 2009 for a little over ten years until Patrick Roest surpassed him in March 2019. The Adelskalender ranks the all-time fastest long track speed skaters by personal best times in the four World Allround Championship distances. Davis is known for his consistency and technical proficiency. Davis is a native of Chicago, Illinois, and trained at two U.S. Olympic training facilities, the Pettit National Ice Center in West Allis, Wisconsin, and the Utah Olympic Oval in Salt Lake City, Utah.

== Early life ==
Davis was born on Friday, August 13, 1982, in Chicago, Illinois, to Reginald Shuck and Cherie Davis. His father selected the name "Shani" from an African name dictionary; the name translates "to adventure." His mother, Cherie, worked for a local lawyer who happened to be a speed skating official and at whose suggestion, Cherie enrolled Shani at the Robert Crown Center in nearby Evanston when he was six years old. She and Davis moved from the South Side neighborhood of Hyde Park to Rogers Park on Chicago's North Side to be closer to his skating club.

== Career ==
=== Junior-level competition ===
At 16, Davis was invited to Lake Placid, New York, to participate in a development program for young speed skaters. After training there for a year, Davis decided to pursue his Olympic dreams and moved to Marquette, Michigan, to further his training. There, he would graduate from Marquette Senior High School, where he ran track his senior year.

Davis earned spots on both the long track and short track teams at the 1999 junior world championship, simultaneously making the national team. In 2000, he made history by becoming the first U.S. skater to make the long and short track teams at the Junior World Teams, a feat he would accomplish again in 2001 and 2002. His height has always made him unique among short trackers, who are much shorter. The extra height made it easier for Davis to race low to the ice. Davis would go on to win a bronze medal in the Team Relay at the 2005 World Short Track Championships in Beijing, China, shared by U.S. teammates Apolo Ohno, Rusty Smith and Alex Izykowski.

=== 2002 Winter Olympics ===
==== Olympic qualification controversy ====
In December 2001, Davis was in Utah to compete for a spot on the 2002 Winter Olympics short track team. Teammates Apolo Ohno and Rusty Smith already had slots on the six-man team, and Ron Biondo was a lock for the third spot; Davis needed to finish first in the final race to qualify. Ohno and Smith were both participating, and Ohno had been dominant; a win by Davis seemed to be a long shot. In a major surprise, Davis won the 1000m race, with Smith second and Ohno third. Davis's first-place finish earned him enough points to move past Tommy O'Hare in the final point standings; he now qualified for sixth place. Davis became the first African-American skater to earn a spot on the team. The euphoria of the victory was short-lived, however. Rumors began to swirl that Ohno and Smith—both good friends of Davis—intentionally threw the race in order to let Davis win the event. O'Hare filed a formal complaint. For three days, Ohno, Smith and Davis stood before an arbitration panel as three of their fellow skaters testified that they heard Ohno telling Smith that he was going to let Davis win.

Ohno later confessed that he had subconsciously held back for fear of suddenly crashing into Davis or Smith, a common occurrence in the sport. He pointed out that he did not need to win the race because he already had a spot on the team. Questions persisted as to whether Ohno had really held back, since he kept passing Biondo. Some speculated that Ohno was holding off Biondo from challenging Smith, as Smith also needed to finish ahead of Biondo in order to secure a spot in the 1000 m for Salt Lake. Even this scenario would have been a violation of the rules of team skating. Both claims went unproven in the arbitration case, and all three were absolved of guilt.

On February 13, 2002, Sports Illustrated writer Brian Cazeneuve published an article stating that, after reviewing the race, "To this day, there is no concrete proof that any skaters violated the spirit of competition." Cazeneuve however, also published the comments of Outdoor Life Network commentator Todd Harris and 1998 Winter Olympian speed skater Eric Flaim, which were made during the broadcast of the race; both men agreed that Ohno and Smith had not skated to the best of their abilities.

Davis wanted to be able to concentrate on both long track and short track. At the time, he was living in Marquette, Michigan, a town with no long track. In 2003, he decided to move to Calgary, Alberta, Canada. Once there, he trained with 1998 short track gold medalist Derrick Campbell.

Davis arrived in Salt Lake City for the 2002 Winter Olympics. After the opening day ceremonies, he decided to leave the Games early to compete in the 2002 Junior Country March and Junior World Championships held in Italy, where he won the 1500m at both competitions. Davis became the only U.S. skater to ever make both short track and long track junior world teams three years in a row.

=== Turning pro ===
Davis made the jump from junior competition to men's speed skating in 2003. In February of that year, he earned the title of North American long track champion, which qualified him for the World Championship in Gothenburg, Sweden. During the competition, Davis was not yet adjusted to skating in the men's division, and his scores were much lower than usual; he finished 16th overall.

In January 2004, Davis became a North American champion for the second consecutive year. He finished in second place overall in the 2004 World Allround Long Track Championships in Hamar, Norway. In March, Davis won the 1500 m at the men's World Single Distance Championships in Seoul, finishing the race in 1:48.64 in March 2004.

Davis set three world records in 2005 – two of them in Salt Lake City. At the World Championship Qualifier on January 9, 2005, he broke the 1500 m world record, recording a time of 1:43.33. He also set the world record for best overall time in the history of the Qualifiers – 1:49.359. A month later, Davis would win the World Champion all-round, scoring 150.778 points. In November, Davis would break another world record at the third World Cup match in the fall of 2005, skating the 1000 m in 1:07.03. Davis did not participate at the Olympic Trials in Salt Lake City in December 2005 because his performances in the Fall World Cup events had already pre-qualified him for the Olympic Team in the 1000 m, 1500 m and 5000 m events.

=== 2006 Winter Olympics ===
Davis won the gold medal in the 1000 m and the silver medal in the 1500 m in Turin.

==== Turin and the team pursuit controversy ====
Leading up to the Olympic Games, coach Tom Cushman attempted to convince Davis to participate in the team pursuit, an event making its debut at those Games. Davis declined the invitation, wishing to focus on the individual events and allow the skaters who had not qualified for individual races a chance to skate. When the U.S. submitted its final roster to the International Skating Union, three days before the first round, Davis was listed as a substitute; a decision Cushman said was made "in case [Davis] changed his mind," although substitutes are only allowed to race in the event of an emergency or illness. Cushman attributed the false reports suggesting Davis had withdrawn from an event he was supposed to race to Cushman's own decision to list him as a substitute.

Fellow skater Chad Hedrick, who was attempting to win five Olympic gold medals, initially reacted to the news that Davis would not participate by saying, "I'm not going to beg Shani to skate the pursuit with me.... My goals are the 1,000, the 1,500, the 10,000 and then the pursuit. If he feels it's not right for him to do it because of other events, that's his prerogative." However, after the 1000m event, in which Davis won gold and Hedrick finished seventh, Hedrick refused to shake Davis's hand, and U.S. coach Eric Heiden commented that Davis was "not a team player." Criticism that included racial slurs was posted to Davis's personal website. While U.S. speedskating released no official statement, Cushman later expressed support for Davis, saying, "I hoped Shani would skate the pursuit but I understand completely why he didn't want to, and I would have done the same thing." U.S. Olympic Committee Chief Executive Jim Scherr commented that "[t]he way the public understood and the media portrayed the situation is inaccurate. Shani never pulled out because he never entered. He made clear his desire to win the individual events he was focused on, and in the light of hindsight, with his two medals, that was the right decision."

=== Post-Olympic performance ===
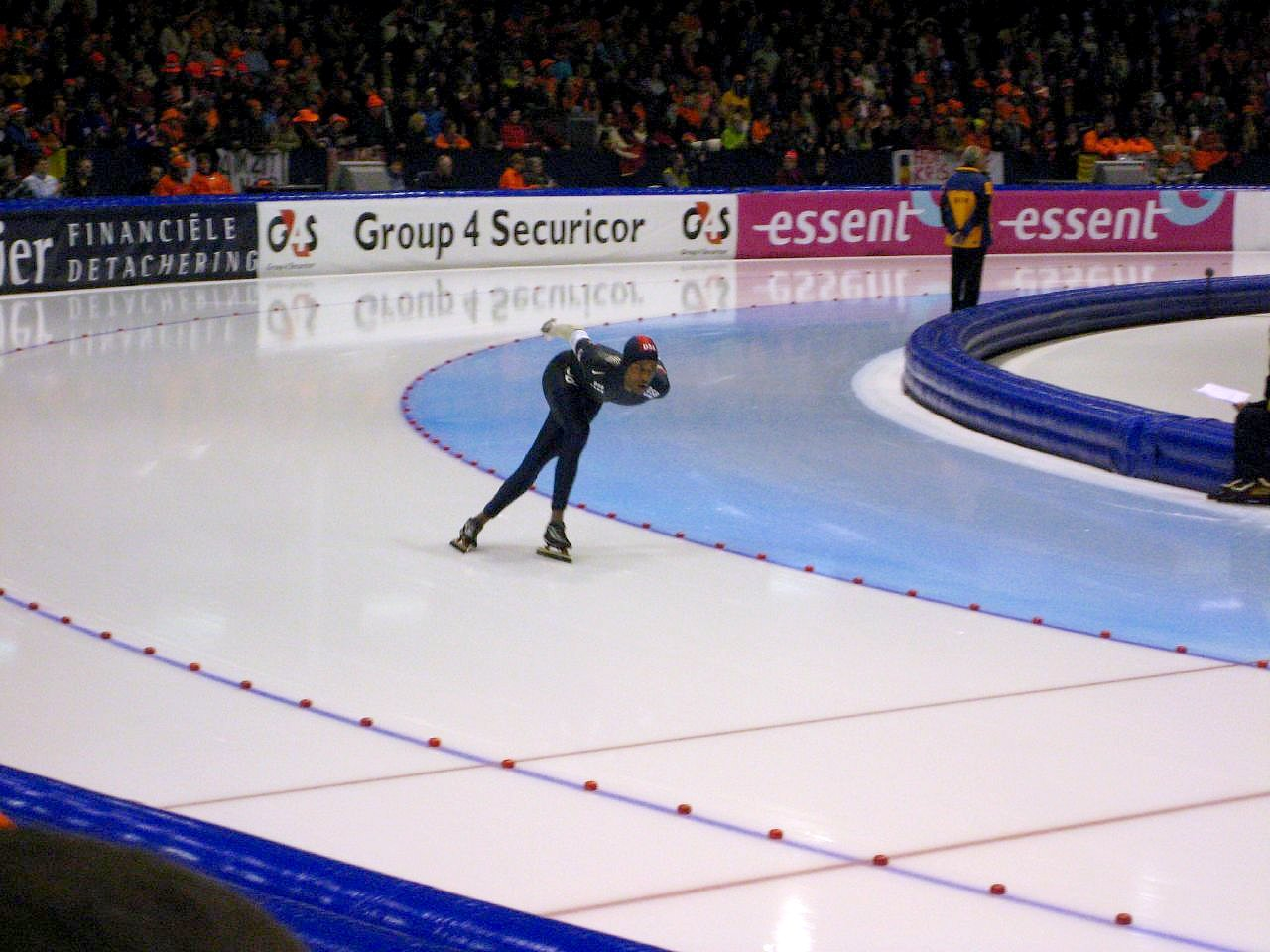
Davis during the World Cup in Heerenveen in 2007

Davis won the final 1000 m World Cup event of the 2006 season at Thialf, Heerenveen, with a time of 1:08.91, becoming the first skater to skate below 1:09 in Heerenveen and also winning the overall World Cup on the 1000 meters. He placed fourth overall in the 1500 meters World Cup, despite only competing in three of the five races.

Davis then defended his World Allround Championships title in Calgary in March 2006 with a world record allround score of 145.742. At the competition, Davis was paired with teammate Chad Hedrick in the 1500 meter race, and dramatically broke Hedrick's own world record with a time of 1:42.68, which Davis would later rebreak that year with a time of 1:42.32. Regarding his world allround title, Davis said, "To me, this is bigger than the Olympics. This medal is prestigious. Not only do you have to skate 500 meters, but you have to skate 10000, you have to skate a 1500 and a 5000 and you only have two days to do it."

In the 2006–07 season, Davis placed third at the World Sprint Championships held in Hamar in January 2007 and also won world titles in the 1000 m and 1500 m events at the World Single Distance Championships held in Salt Lake City in March 2007.

In the 2007–08 season, Davis won overall world cup titles in the 1000 m and 1500 m, defended his 1000 m world title at the World Single Distance Championships held in Nagano, Japan, and tied for second in the 1500 m with Sven Kramer of the Netherlands.

In the 2008–09 season, Davis defended his world cup titles in the 1000 m and 1500 m. He broke world records in the 1000 m and 1500 m and won the 1500 world title at the World Single Distance Championships held in Vancouver, British Columbia, Canada. He placed third in 1000 m and won the 2009 World Sprint Speed Skating Championship in Moscow. He became only the second male skater in history—joining Eric Heiden—to win both the World Allround and World Sprint titles.

=== 2010 Winter Olympics ===
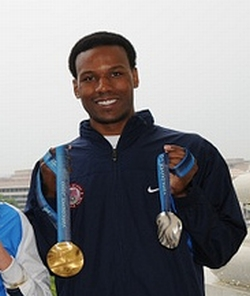
Davis with the medals that he won in the 2010 Winter Olympics

At the 2010 Winter Olympics in Vancouver, British Columbia, Canada, Davis competed in four long-track speed skating events: the 500, 1000, 1500 and 5000 meter races. All four of these events were held at the Richmond Olympic Oval, where Davis had held the track record in the 1000 and 1500 meter races, setting those records in 2009. Davis won the 1000-meter speed skating event, becoming the first man to win back-to-back 1000-meter Olympic speed skating gold medals and the only gold medal for speed skating from the United States at these games. Davis won in 1 minute and 8.94 seconds, finishing just 18/100ths of a second quicker than his rival, South Korea's Mo Tae-bum. Davis won a silver medal at the 1500 m distance, being defeated for the gold medal by Mark Tuitert of the Netherlands. Davis finished 12th in the 5000 meters and withdrew after a poor first race in the 500 meters.

=== 2014 Winter Olympics ===
In the 1000-meter race, Davis finished 8th at 1:09.12. In the 500-meter race, Davis finished 24th at 70.98. In the 1500-meter race, Davis finished 11th at 1:45.98. He did not compete in the 5000.

=== 2018 Winter Olympics ===
On February 13, 2018, in the 1500-meter race, Davis finished 19th at 1:46.74. On February 23, 2018, in the 1000-meter race, Davis finished 7th at 1:08.78.

==== American flagbearer voting controversy ====
One day before the February 9 opening ceremonies for the 2018 Winter Olympics, Davis Tweeted his displeasure with the process for choosing the American team flag bearer. Following a vote among representative athletes from each of the eight winter sports federations, Davis and four-time Olympic luger Erin Hamlin had each received four votes. Following the pre-determined procedure for settling a tie vote, a coin toss was made. Hamlin won the toss and was therefore selected to carry the flag. Davis's Tweet called the coin toss "dishonorable" and included the hashtag #BlackHistoryMonth2018. Hamlin is white.

=== Retirement ===
He announced his retirement from skating in November 2019.

== Records ==
=== Personal records ===
Personal records
Men's speed skating
Event	Result	Date	Location	Notes
500 m	34.78	March 6, 2009	Utah Olympic Oval, Salt Lake City	
1000 m	1:06.42	March 7, 2009	Utah Olympic Oval, Salt Lake City	World record until beaten by Kjeld Nuis on March 9, 2019. Still current American record.
1500 m	1:41.04	December 11, 2009	Utah Olympic Oval, Salt Lake City	World record until beaten by Denis Yuskov on December 9, 2017. Still current American record.
3000 m	3:41.43	September 23, 2017	Olympic Oval, Calgary	
5000 m	6:10.49	March 18, 2006	Olympic Oval, Calgary	
10000 m	13:05.94	March 19, 2006	Olympic Oval, Calgary	
Big combination	145.742	March 18–19, 2006	Olympic Oval, Calgary	World record until beaten by Patrick Roest on March 2–3, 2019.

=== World records ===
World records
Men's speed skating
Event	Result	Date	Location	Notes
1500 m	1:43.33	January 9, 2005	Utah Olympic Oval, Salt Lake City	World record until beaten by Chad Hedrick on November 18, 2005.
Big combination	149.359	January 8–9, 2005	Utah Olympic Oval, Salt Lake City	World record until beaten by Chad Hedrick on January 21–22, 2006.
1000 m	1:07.03	November 20, 2005	Utah Olympic Oval, Salt Lake City	World record until beaten by Pekka Koskela on November 10, 2007.
1500 m	1:42.68	March 19, 2006	Olympic Oval, Calgary	World record until beaten by himself on March 4, 2007.
Big combination	145.742	March 18–19, 2006	Olympic Oval, Calgary	World record until beaten by Patrick Roest on March 2–3, 2019.
1500 m	1:42.32	March 4, 2007	Olympic Oval, Calgary	World record – shared with Erben Wennemars from November 9, 2007 – until beaten by Denny Morrison on March 14, 2008.
1500 m	1:41.80	March 6, 2009	Utah Olympic Oval, Salt Lake City	World record until beaten by himself on December 11, 2009.
1000 m	1:06.42	March 7, 2009	Utah Olympic Oval, Salt Lake City	World record until beaten by Kjeld Nuis on March 9, 2019.
1500 m	1:41.04	December 11, 2009	Utah Olympic Oval, Salt Lake City	World record until beaten by Denis Yuskov on December 9, 2017.

== Personal life ==
Davis trained at the Olympic speedskating center in Marquette, Michigan, where as of February 2010 he also was attending classes at Northern Michigan University.

Frozone, an African-American superhero with ice powers from the animated movie The Incredibles, was allegedly inspired by Shani Davis.

Records
Preceded by (Netherlands) Gerard van Velde (Finland) Pekka Koskela	Men's 1000 m speed skating world record November 20, 2005 – November 10, 2007; March 7, 2009 – March 9, 2019	Succeeded by (Finland) Pekka Koskela (Netherlands) Kjeld Nuis
Preceded by (United States) Derek Parra (United States) Chad Hedrick (Canada) Denny Morrison	Men's 1500 m speed skating world record January 9, 2005 – November 18, 2005; March 19, 2006 – March 14, 2008; March 6, 2009 – December 9, 2017	Succeeded by (United States) Chad Hedrick (Canada) Denny Morrison (Russia) Denis Yuskov
Preceded by (United States) Chad Hedrick (United States) Chad Hedrick	Men's big combination speed skating world record January 9, 2005 – January 21, 2006; March 19, 2006 – March 3, 2019	Succeeded by (United States) Chad Hedrick (Netherlands) Patrick Roest
Awards
Preceded by (United States) Chad Hedrick (Canada) Jeremy Wotherspoon	Oscar Mathisen Award; 2005; 2009	Succeeded by (Canada) Cindy Klassen (Czech Republic) Martina Sáblíková
