= 2016 World Allround Speed Skating Championships – Women =

Women's at the 2016 World Allround Speed Skating Championships
- Venue: Sportforum Hohenschönhausen, Berlin
- Date: 5–6 March
- Competitors: 24
- Winning points: 159.042

Medalists
gold medal	Martina Sáblíková	Czech Republic
silver medal	Ireen Wüst	Netherlands
bronze medal	Antoinette de Jong	Netherlands

The women's event of the 2016 World Allround Speed Skating Championships was held on 5 and 6 March 2016.

== Results ==
=== 500 m ===
The race was started at 12:58.

Rank	Pair	Lane	Name	Country	Time	Diff
1	10	o	Miho Takagi	JPN	38.93	
2	12	i	Misaki Oshigiri	JPN	38.95	+0.02
3	9	i	Ayaka Kikuchi	JPN	39.34	+0.41
4	8	i	Ireen Wüst	NED	39.41	+0.48
5	7	o	Antoinette de Jong	NED	39.44	+0.51
6	8	o	Yuliya Skokova	RUS	39.59	+0.66
7	7	i	Martina Sáblíková	CZE	39.62	+0.69
8	9	o	Ida Njåtun	NOR	39.73	+0.80
9	6	o	Linda de Vries	NED	39.84	+0.91
10	11	o	Ivanie Blondin	CAN	39.86	+0.93
11	4	o	Natalia Czerwonka	POL	39.91	+0.98
12	5	o	Zhao Xin	CHN	39.98	+1.05
13	12	o	Hao Jiachen	CHN	40.04	+1.11
14	3	i	Natalya Voronina	RUS	40.05	+1.12
15	6	i	Kelly Gunther	USA	40.06	+1.13
16	11	i	Liu Jing	CHN	40.14	+1.21
17	5	i	Roxanne Dufter	GER	40.26	+1.33
18	2	i	Olga Graf	RUS	40.41	+1.48
19	10	i	Luiza Złotkowska	POL	40.51	+1.58
20	1	o	Claudia Pechstein	GER	40.54	+1.61
21	1	i	Francesca Lollobrigida	ITA	40.55	+1.62
22	4	i	Marina Zueva	BLR	40.85	+1.92
23	2	o	Sofie-Karoline Haugen	NOR	41.15	+2.22
24	3	o	Aleksandra Goss	POL	41.81	+2.88

=== 3000 m ===
The race was started at 16:06.

Rank	Pair	Lane	Name	Country	Time	Diff
1	12	i	Martina Sáblíková	CZE	3:58.11	
2	9	o	Ireen Wüst	NED	3:59.43	+1.32
3	5	i	Antoinette de Jong	NED	4:02.88	+4.77
4	10	i	Natalya Voronina	RUS	4:04.98	+6.87
5	10	o	Linda de Vries	NED	4:05.61	+7.50
6	7	i	Misaki Oshigiri	JPN	4:07.82	+9.71
7	11	i	Claudia Pechstein	GER	4:08.01	+9.90
8	11	o	Olga Graf	RUS	4:08.19	+10.08
9	9	i	Ida Njåtun	NOR	4:08.79	+10.68
10	5	o	Miho Takagi	JPN	4:09.04	+10.93
11	2	i	Luiza Złotkowska	POL	4:09.56	+11.45
12	6	i	Ayaka Kikuchi	JPN	4:10.75	+12.64
13	3	i	Yuliya Skokova	RUS	4:11.42	+13.31
14	2	o	Natalia Czerwonka	POL	4:12.77	+14.66
15	8	o	Marina Zueva	BLR	4:14.06	+15.95
16	12	o	Ivanie Blondin	CAN	4:14.13	+16.02
17	8	i	Hao Jiachen	CHN	4:14.55	+16.44
18	7	o	Francesca Lollobrigida	ITA	4:14.60	+16.49
19	1	o	Roxanne Dufter	GER	4:15.39	+17.28
20	4	o	Liu Jing	CHN	4:15.61	+17.50
21	6	o	Zhao Xin	CHN	4:17.17	+19.06
22	1	i	Sofie-Karoline Haugen	NOR	4:19.14	+21.03
23	3	o	Kelly Gunther	USA	4:22.26	+24.15
24	4	i	Aleksandra Goss	POL	4:23.70	+25.59

=== 1500 m ===
The race was started at 14:24.

Rank	Pair	Lane	Name	Country	Time	Diff
1	12	o	Ireen Wüst	NED	1:54.83	
2	12	i	Martina Sáblíková	CZE	1:55.44	+0.61
3	10	o	Linda de Vries	NED	1:57.04	+2.21
4	11	i	Antoinette de Jong	NED	1:57.17	+2.34
5	7	i	Olga Graf	RUS	1:57.28	+2.45
6	11	o	Misaki Oshigiri	JPN	1:57.55	+2.72
7	8	o	Yuliya Skokova	RUS	1:57.93	+3.10
8	8	i	Ida Njåtun	NOR	1:58.22	+3.39
9	9	o	Ayaka Kikuchi	JPN	1:58.31	+3.48
10	10	i	Miho Takagi	JPN	1:58.53	+3.70
11	6	i	Natalia Czerwonka	POL	1:58.76	+3.93
12	6	o	Luiza Złotkowska	POL	1:59.17	+4.34
13	7	o	Claudia Pechstein	GER	1:59.69	+4.86
14	4	o	Roxanne Dufter	GER	1:59.89	+5.07
15	5	o	Hao Jiachen	CHN	2:00.09	+5.26
16	9	i	Natalya Voronina	RUS	2:00.32	+5.49
17	3	o	Francesca Lollobrigida	ITA	2:00.75	+5.92
18	5	i	Ivanie Blondin	CAN	2:01.29	+6.46
19	3	i	Zhao Xin	CHN	2:01.31	+6.48
20	4	i	Liu Jing	CHN	2:01.94	+7.11
21	2	o	Kelly Gunther	USA	2:03.48	+8.65
22	2	i	Marina Zueva	BLR	2:03.52	+8.69
23	1	i	Sofie-Karoline Haugen	NOR	2:05.60	+10.77
—	1	o	Aleksandra Goss	POL	DNS	

=== 5000 m ===
The race was started at 16:44.

Rank	Pair	Lane	Name	Country	Time	Diff
1	4	i	Martina Sáblíková	CZE	6:52.57	
2	4	o	Ireen Wüst	NED	7:01.41	+8.84
3	2	o	Antoinette de Jong	NED	7:04.04	+11.47
4	3	i	Linda de Vries	NED	7:06.79	+14.22
5	2	i	Natalya Voronina	RUS	7:08.54	+15.97
6	3	o	Misaki Oshigiri	JPN	7:13.01	+20.44
7	1	o	Ayaka Kikuchi	JPN	7:18.12	+25.55
8	1	i	Miho Takagi	JPN	7:18.61	+26.04

=== Final standings ===
After all events.

Rank	Name	Country	points	Diff
1st place, gold medalist(s)	Martina Sáblíková	CZE	159.042	
2nd place, silver medalist(s)	Ireen Wüst	NED	159.732	+0.69
3rd place, bronze medalist(s)	Antoinette de Jong	NED	161.380	+2.34
4	Linda de Vries	NED	162.467	+3.43
5	Misaki Oshigiri	JPN	162.737	+3.70
6	Miho Takagi	JPN	163.807	+4.77
7	Natalya Voronina	RUS	163.840	+4.80
8	Ayaka Kikuchi	JPN	164.379	+5.34
9	Ida Njåtun	NOR	120.601	
10	Yuliya Skokova	RUS	120.803	
11	Olga Graf	RUS	120.868	
12	Natalia Czerwonka	POL	121.624	
13	Claudia Pechstein	GER	121.771	
14	Luiza Złotkowska	POL	121.826	
15	Hao Jiachen	CHN	122.495	
16	Ivanie Blondin	CAN	122.645	
17	Roxanne Dufter	GER	122.791	
18	Francesca Lollobrigida	ITA	123.233	
19	Zhao Xin	CHN	123.277	
20	Liu Jing	CHN	123.387	
21	Marina Zueva	BLR	124.366	
22	Kelly Gunther	USA	124.930	
23	Sofie-Karoline Haugen	NOR	126.206	
—	Aleksandra Goss	POL		
