= 2018 World Allround Speed Skating Championships – Women =

Women at the 2018 World Allround Speed Skating Championships
- Venue: Olympic Stadium
- Location: Amsterdam, Netherlands
- Dates: 9–10 March
- Competitors: 22 from 11 nations
- Winning points: 166.905

Medalists
gold medal	Miho Takagi	Japan
silver medal	Ireen Wüst	Netherlands
bronze medal	Annouk van der Weijden	Netherlands

The Women competition at the 2018 World Allround Speed Skating Championships was held on 9 and 10 March 2018.

== Results ==
=== 500 m ===
The race was started on 9 March at 19:30.

Rank	Pair	Lane	Name	Country	Time	Diff
1	2	o	Miho Takagi	Japan	39.01	
2	11	o	Gabriele Hirschbichler	Germany	40.22	+1.21
3	3	o	Ayaka Kikuchi	Japan	40.32	+1.31
4	10	i	Antoinette de Jong	Netherlands	40.47	+1.46
4	8	i	Nikola Zdráhalová	Czech Republic	40.47	+1.46
6	10	o	Ida Njåtun	Norway	40.55	+1.54
7	9	o	Natalia Czerwonka	Poland	40.75	+1.74
8	1	o	Francesca Lollobrigida	Italy	40.78	+1.77
9	11	i	Ireen Wüst	Netherlands	40.81	+1.80
10	9	i	Annouk van der Weijden	Netherlands	40.89	+1.88
11	1	i	Li Dan	China	40.90	+1.89
12	2	i	Ivanie Blondin	Canada	41.10	+2.09
13	4	o	Yuliya Skokova	Russia	41.13	+2.12
14	5	i	Sofie Karoline Haugen	Norway	41.24	+2.23
15	6	o	Evgeniia Lalenkova	Russia	41.36	+2.35
16	8	o	Hao Jiachen	China	41.68	+2.67
17	7	i	Luiza Złotkowska	Poland	41.70	+2.69
18	6	i	Claudia Pechstein	Germany	41.77	+2.76
19	7	o	Martina Sáblíková	Czech Republic	41.81	+2.80
20	4	i	Katarzyna Woźniak	Poland	42.21	+3.20
21	5	o	Jelena Peeters	Belgium	42.36	+3.35
22	3	i	Natálie Kerschbaummayr	Czech Republic	42.98	+3.97

=== 3000 m ===
The race was started on 9 of March at 20:24.

Rank	Pair	Lane	Name	Country	Time	Diff
1	9	i	Ireen Wüst	Netherlands	4:15.80	
2	11	o	Miho Takagi	Japan	4:19.78	+3.98
3	8	o	Martina Sáblíková	Czech Republic	4:21.05	+5.25
4	7	i	Annouk van der Weijden	Netherlands	4:22.35	+6.55
5	10	i	Antoinette de Jong	Netherlands	4:23.05	+7.24
6	9	o	Ayaka Kikuchi	Japan	4:24.01	+8.21
7	8	i	Francesca Lollobrigida	Italy	4:24.05	+8.24
8	1	o	Evgeniia Lalenkova	Russia	4:24.50	+8.70
9	6	i	Nikola Zdráhalová	Czech Republic	4:26.47	+10.67
10	10	o	Ivanie Blondin	Canada	4:26.55	+10.75
11	11	i	Claudia Pechstein	Germany	4:27.43	+11.63
12	7	o	Hao Jiachen	China	4:28.86	+13.05
13	5	o	Ida Njåtun	Norway	4:28.93	+13.13
14	2	o	Sofie Karoline Haugen	Norway	4:29.68	+13.87
15	3	i	Natalia Czerwonka	Poland	4:30.29	+14.49
16	3	o	Yuliya Skokova	Russia	4:30.31	+14.51
17	4	i	Luiza Złotkowska	Poland	4:32.62	+16.82
18	5	i	Katarzyna Woźniak	Poland	4:33.07	+17.27
19	2	i	Natálie Kerschbaummayr	Czech Republic	4:34.17	+18.37
20	6	o	Li Dan	China	4:35.64	+19.84
21	4	o	Jelena Peeters	Belgium	4:36.27	+20.47
22	1	i	Gabriele Hirschbichler	Germany	4:40.21	+24.41

=== 1500 m ===
The race was started on 10 March at 17:00.

Rank	Pair	Lane	Name	Country	Time	Diff
1	11	i	Miho Takagi	Japan	1:58.82	
2	11	o	Ireen Wüst	Netherlands	1:58.89	+0.07
3	9	o	Francesca Lollobrigida	Italy	2:00.48	+1.66
4	9	i	Annouk van der Weijden	Netherlands	2:00.94	+2.12
5	2	i	Luiza Zlotkowska	Poland	2:01.80	+2.98
6	10	i	Antoinette de Jong	Netherlands	2:01.90	+3.08
7	8	o	Martina Sáblíková	Czech Republic	2:02.49	+3.67
8	7	i	Ida Njåtun	Norway	2:02.86	+4.04
9	10	o	Ayaka Kikuchi	Japan	2:03.15	+4.33
10	7	o	Evgeniia Lalenkova	Russia	2:03.35	+4.53
11	4	i	Claudia Pechstein	Germany	2:03.53	+4.71
12	8	i	Nikola Zdráhalová	Czech Republic	2:03.60	+4.78
13	6	o	Natalia Czerwonka	Poland	2:03.66	+4.84
14	2	o	Katarzyna Wozniak	Poland	2:04.09	+5.27
15	5	i	Yuliya Skokova	Russia	2:05.06	+6.24
16	5	o	Sofie Karoline Haugen	Norway	2:05.24	+6.42
17	6	i	Ivanie Blondin	Canada	2:05.32	+6.50
18	3	o	Gabriele Hirschbichler	Germany	2:05.48	+6.66
19	3	i	Li Dan	China	2:05.94	+7.12
20	4	o	Hao Jiachen	China	2:06.55	+7.73
21	1	i	Natálie Kerschbaummayr	Czech Republic	2:10.63	+11.81

=== 5000 m ===
The race was started on 10 March at 21:06.

Rank	Pair	Lane	Name	Country	Time	Diff
1	4	i	Ireen Wüst	Netherlands	7:26.85	
2	1	i	Martina Sáblíková	Czech Republic	7:28.17	+1.32
3	3	i	Annouk van der Weijden	Netherlands	7:29.12	+2.27
4	4	o	Miho Takagi	Japan	7:29.93	+3.08
5	3	o	Antoinette de Jong	Netherlands	7:30.73	+3.88
6	2	i	Francesca Lollobrigida	Italy	7:32.35	+5.50
7	2	o	Nikola Zdráhalová	Czech Republic	7:39.70	+12.85
8	1	o	Ayaka Kikuchi	Japan	7:46.71	+19.86

=== Overall standings ===
After all events.

Rank	Name	Country	500m	3000m	1500m	5000m	Points	Diff
1st place, gold medalist(s)	Miho Takagi	Japan	39.01	4:19.78	1:58.82	7:29.93	166.905	
2nd place, silver medalist(s)	Ireen Wüst	Netherlands	40.81	4:15.80	1:58.89	7:26.85	167.758	+0.86
3rd place, bronze medalist(s)	Annouk van der Weijden	Netherlands	40.89	4:22.35	2:00.94	7:29.12	169.840	+2.94
4	Antoinette de Jong	Netherlands	40.47	4:23.04	2:01.90	7:30.73	170.016	+3.12
5	Francesca Lollobrigida	Italy	40.78	4:24.04	2:00.48	7:32.35	170.181	+3.28
6	Martina Sáblíková	Czech Republic	41.81	4:21.05	2:02.49	7:28.17	170.965	+4.06
7	Ayaka Kikuchi	Japan	40.32	4:24.01	2:03.15	7:46.71	172.042	+5.14
8	Nikola Zdráhalová	Czech Republic	40.47	4:26.47	2:03.60	7:39.70	171.051	+5.15
9	Ida Njåtun	Norway	40.55	4:28.93	2:02.86	—N/a	126.324	—N/a
10	Evgeniia Lalenkova	Russia	41.36	4:24.50	2:03.35	—N/a	126.559	—N/a
11	Natalia Czerwonka	Poland	40.75	4:30.29	2:03.66	—N/a	127.018	—N/a
12	Ivanie Blondin	Canada	41.10	4:26.55	2:05.32	—N/a	127.298	—N/a
13	Claudia Pechstein	Germany	41.77	4:27.43	2:03.53	—N/a	127.517	—N/a
14	Luiza Złotkowska	Poland	41.70	4:32.62	2:01.80	—N/a	127.736	—N/a
15	Yuliya Skokova	Russia	41.13	4:30.31	2:05.06	—N/a	127.867	—N/a
16	Sofie Karoline Haugen	Norway	41.24	4:29.67	2:05.24	—N/a	127.931	—N/a
17	Hao Jiachen	China	41.68	4:28.85	2:06.55	—N/a	128.671	—N/a
18	Gabriele Hirschbichler	Germany	40.22	4:40.21	2:05.48	—N/a	128.747	—N/a
19	Li Dan	China	40.90	4:35.64	2:05.94	—N/a	128.820	—N/a
20	Katarzyna Woźniak	Poland	42.21	4:33.07	2:04.09	—N/a	129.084	—N/a
21	Natálie Kerschbaummayr	Czech Republic	42.98	4:34.17	2:10.63	—N/a	132.218	—N/a
	Jelena Peeters	Belgium	42.36	4:36.27	DNS	—N/a	–	—N/a
