= 2019 World Single Distances Speed Skating Championships – Women's 1500 metres =

Women's 1500 metres at the 2019 World Single Distances Speed Skating Championships
- Venue: Max Aicher Arena
- Location: Inzell, Germany
- Dates: 10 February
- Competitors: 24 from 12 nations
- Winning time: 1:52.81

Medalists
gold medal	Ireen Wüst	Netherlands
silver medal	Miho Takagi	Japan
bronze medal	Brittany Bowe	United States

The Women's 1500 metres competition at the 2019 World Single Distances Speed Skating Championships was held on 10 February 2019.

== Results ==
The race was started at 14:30.

Rank	Pair	Lane	Name	Country	Time	Diff
1st place, gold medalist(s)	10	o	Ireen Wüst	Netherlands	1:52.81	
2nd place, silver medalist(s)	11	o	Miho Takagi	Japan	1:53.32	+0.51
3rd place, bronze medalist(s)	12	i	Brittany Bowe	United States	1:53.36	+0.55
4	10	i	Yekaterina Shikhova	Russia	1:53.41	+0.60
5	9	o	Antoinette de Jong	Netherlands	1:53.76	+0.95
6	7	o	Melissa Wijfje	Netherlands	1:54.50	+1.69
7	12	o	Evgeniia Lalenkova	Russia	1:54.94	+2.13
8	11	i	Francesca Lollobrigida	Italy	1:55.15	+2.34
9	6	o	Elizaveta Kazelina	Russia	1:56.11	+3.30
10	2	i	Noemi Bonazza	Italy	1:56.14	+3.33
11	3	o	Roxanne Dufter	Germany	1:56.37	+3.56
12	7	i	Natalia Czerwonka	Poland	1:56.40	+3.59
13	8	i	Nana Takagi	Japan	1:56.44	+3.63
14	5	o	Zhao Xin	China	1:56.86	+4.05
15	6	i	Valerie Maltais	Canada	1:56.90	+4.09
16	8	o	Ayano Sato	Japan	1:57.15	+4.34
17	1	o	Nikola Zdráhalová	Czech Republic	1:57.42	+4.61
18	3	i	Yekaterina Aydova	Kazakhstan	1:57.46	+4.65
19	9	i	Ragne Wiklund	Norway	1:57.59	+4.78
20	4	i	Han Mei	China	1:57.74	+4.93
21	2	o	Kali Christ	Canada	1:57.79	+4.98
22	1	i	Li Dan	China	1:58.02	+5.21
23	4	o	Gabriele Hirschbichler	Germany	1:58.62	+5.81
24	5	i	Karolina Bosiek	Poland	1:58.86	+6.05
