= 2017 World Single Distances Speed Skating Championships – Women's 1500 metres =

Women's 1500 metres at the 2017 World Single Distances Speed Skating Championships
- Venue: Gangneung Oval
- Location: Gangneung, South Korea
- Dates: 12 February
- Competitors: 24 from 10 nations
- Winning time: 1:54.08

Medalists
gold medal	Heather Bergsma	United States
silver medal	Ireen Wüst	Netherlands
bronze medal	Miho Takagi	Japan

The Women's 1500 metres competition at the 2017 World Single Distances Speed Skating Championships was held on 12 February 2017.

== Results ==
The race was started at 18:00.

Rank	Pair	Lane	Name	Country	Time	Diff
1st place, gold medalist(s)	12	o	Heather Bergsma	United States	1:54.08	
2nd place, silver medalist(s)	12	i	Ireen Wüst	Netherlands	1:54.19	+0.11
3rd place, bronze medalist(s)	10	i	Miho Takagi	Japan	1:55.12	+1.04
4	10	o	Marrit Leenstra	Netherlands	1:55.85	+1.77
5	5	i	Jorien ter Mors	Netherlands	1:56.18	+2.10
6	9	o	Martina Sáblíková	Czech Republic	1:56.20	+2.12
7	11	o	Olga Graf	Russia	1:57.43	+3.35
8	3	i	Katarzyna Bachleda-Curuś	Poland	1:57.51	+3.43
9	8	i	Yekaterina Shikhova	Russia	1:57.73	+3.65
10	9	i	Natalia Czerwonka	Poland	1:57.87	+3.79
11	7	o	Yekaterina Lobysheva	Russia	1:58.30	+4.22
12	11	i	Misaki Oshigiri	Japan	1:58.63	+4.55
13	3	o	Luiza Złotkowska	Poland	1:58.70	+4.62
14	7	i	Mia Manganello	United States	1:58.95	+4.87
15	1	o	Nikola Zdráhalová	Czech Republic	1:59.04	+4.96
16	6	o	Ida Njåtun	Norway	1:59.15	+5.07
17	2	o	Bente Kraus	Germany	1:59.35	+5.27
18	4	i	Isabelle Weidemann	Canada	1:59.47	+5.39
19	8	o	Roxanne Dufter	Germany	2:00.46	+6.38
20	5	o	Ayano Sato	Japan	2:00.58	+6.50
21	4	o	Gabriele Hirschbichler	Germany	2:00.94	+6.86
22	6	i	Brianne Tutt	Canada	2:01.26	+7.18
23	1	i	Park Ji-woo	South Korea	2:01.43	+7.35
24	2	i	Kelly Gunther	United States	2:01.86	+7.78
