= Speed skating at the 2018 Winter Olympics – Women's team pursuit =

Women's team pursuit at the XXIII Olympic Winter Games
- Venue: Gangneung Oval, Gangneung, South Korea
- Date: 19 February 2018 (quarterfinals); 21 February 2018 (semifinals, finals)
- Competitors: 29 from 8 nations
- Winning time: 2:53.89

Medalists
1st place, gold medalist(s)		Miho Takagi; Ayano Sato; Nana Takagi; Ayaka Kikuchi	Japan
2nd place, silver medalist(s)		Marrit Leenstra; Ireen Wüst; Antoinette de Jong; Lotte van Beek	Netherlands
3rd place, bronze medalist(s)		Heather Bergsma; Brittany Bowe; Mia Manganello; Carlijn Schoutens	United States

The women's team pursuit speed skating competition of the 2018 Winter Olympics was held on 19 and 21 February 2018 at Gangneung Oval in Gangneung on 21 February 2018.

== Records ==
Prior to this competition, the existing world, Olympic and track records were as follows.

World record	Japan; Miho Takagi; Ayano Sato; Nana Takagi	2:50.87	Salt Lake City, United States	8 December 2017
Olympic record	Netherlands; Marrit Leenstra; Jorien ter Mors; Ireen Wüst	2:58.05	Sochi, Russia	22 February 2014
Track record	Netherlands; Marrit Leenstra; Ireen Wüst; Antoinette de Jong	2:55.85		10 February 2017

The following records were set during this competition.

Date	Round	Athlete	Country	Time	Record
19 February	Quarterfinal 1	Marrit Leenstra; Ireen Wüst; Antoinette de Jong	Netherlands	2:55.61	OR; WB (sea level); TR
21 February	Final A	Miho Takagi; Ayano Sato; Nana Takagi	Japan	2:53.89	OR; WB (sea level); TR

OR = Olympic record, TR = track record

== Results ==
=== Quarterfinals ===
The quarterfinals were held on 19 February at 20:00.

Rank	Heat	Country	Name	Time	Notes
1	1	Netherlands	Antoinette de Jong; Marrit Leenstra; Ireen Wüst	2:55.61; OR, TR	Semifinal 1
2	2	Japan	Ayano Sato; Miho Takagi; Nana Takagi	2:56.09	Semifinal 2
3	3	Canada	Ivanie Blondin; Josie Morrison; Isabelle Weidemann	2:59.02	Semifinal 2
4	4	United States	Heather Bergsma; Brittany Bowe; Mia Manganello	2:59.75	Semifinal 1
5	2	China	Han Mei; Hao Jiachen; Li Dan	3:00.01	Final C
6	3	Germany	Roxanne Dufter; Gabriele Hirschbichler; Claudia Pechstein	3:02.65	Final C
7	1	South Korea	Kim Bo-reum; Noh Seon-yeong; Park Ji-woo	3:03.76	Final D
8	4	Poland	Katarzyna Bachleda-Curuś; Natalia Czerwonka; Luiza Złotkowska	3:04.80	Final D

=== Semifinals ===
The semifinals were held on 21 February at 20:00.

Rank	Country	Name	Time	Deficit	Notes
Semifinal 1
1	Netherlands	Antoinette de Jong; Lotte van Beek; Ireen Wüst	3:00.41		Final A
2	United States	Heather Bergsma; Mia Manganello; Carlijn Schoutens	3:07.28	+6.87	Final B
Semifinal 2
1	Japan	Ayaka Kikuchi; Miho Takagi; Nana Takagi	2:58.94		Final A
2	Canada	Ivanie Blondin; Keri Morrison; Isabelle Weidemann	3:01.84	+2.90	Final B

=== Finals ===
The finals were held on 21 February at 20:54.

Rank	Country	Name	Time	Deficit	Notes
Final A
1st place, gold medalist(s)	Japan	Ayano Sato; Miho Takagi; Nana Takagi	2:53.89		OR, TR
2nd place, silver medalist(s)	Netherlands	Antoinette de Jong; Marrit Leenstra; Ireen Wüst	2:55.48	+1.59	
Final B
3rd place, bronze medalist(s)	United States	Heather Bergsma; Brittany Bowe; Mia Manganello	2:59.27		
4	Canada	Ivanie Blondin; Josie Morrison; Isabelle Weidemann	2:59.72	+0.45	
Final C
5	China	Hao Jiachen; Li Dan; Liu Jing	3:00.04		
6	Germany	Roxanne Dufter; Gabriele Hirschbichler; Claudia Pechstein	3:04.67	+4.63	
Final D
7	Poland	Karolina Bosiek; Natalia Czerwonka; Luiza Złotkowska	3:03.11		
8	South Korea	Kim Bo-reum; Noh Seon-yeong; Park Ji-woo	3:07.30	+4.19	
