= 2017 European Speed Skating Championships =

International speed skating competition

- Venue: Thialf, Heerenveen, Netherlands
- Dates: 6–8 January 2017
- Competitors: 80 from 16 nations

Medalist men
1st place, gold medalist(s)		Sven Kramer	NED
1st place, gold medalist(s)		Kai Verbij	NED
2nd place, silver medalist(s)		Jan Blokhuijsen	NED
2nd place, silver medalist(s)		Kjeld Nuis	NED
3rd place, bronze medalist(s)		Bart Swings	BEL
3rd place, bronze medalist(s)		Nico Ihle	GER

Medalist women
1st place, gold medalist(s)		Ireen Wüst	NED
1st place, gold medalist(s)		Karolína Erbanová	CZE
2nd place, silver medalist(s)		Martina Sáblíková	CZE
2nd place, silver medalist(s)		Jorien ter Mors	NED
3rd place, bronze medalist(s)		Antoinette de Jong	NED
3rd place, bronze medalist(s)		Olga Fatkulina	RUS

The 2017 European Speed Skating Championships were held in Heerenveen, Netherlands, from 6 to 8 January 2017. Skaters from 12 countries participated. It was the first time that allround and sprint were held at the same time and venue.

The event was originally planned to be held in Zakopane, Poland, but in October 2016, the Polish skating union informed the ISU that it was not able to organize the event.

Sven Kramer of Netherlands and Martina Sáblíková of the Czech Republic were the defending champions in allround. Kramer successfully defended his allround title, winning a record 9th title overall, and Ireen Wüst of the Netherlands won her 5th allround title. In sprint, Kai Verbij won the men's title, while Czech Karolína Erbanová won the women's event.

== Schedule ==
The schedule of events:

Date	Allround	Sprint
Friday, 6 January; 18:15h	500 m women 3000 m women	1st 500 m men 1st 1000m m men
Saturday, 7 January; 11:00h	1500 m women 500 m men 5000 m women 5000 m men	1st 500 m women 2nd 500 m men 1st 1000m m women 2nd 1000m m men
Sunday, 8 January; 13:30h	1500 m men 10000 m men	2nd 500 m women 2nd 1000m m women

All times are CET (UTC+1).

== Allround ==
=== Men's championships ===
DNS = did not start, WDR = withdrew, DQ = disqualified

==== Day 2 ====
===== 500 metres =====
Rank	Skater	Nat.	Time	Behind	Points
1	Sindre Henriksen	(Norway)	36.30		36.300
2	Jan Blokhuijsen	(Netherlands)	36.43	+0.13	36.430
3	Denis Yuskov	(Russia)	36.44	+0.14	36.440
4	Konrad Niedźwiedzki	(Poland)	36.50	+0.20	36.500
5	Simen Spieler Nilsen	(Norway)	36.55	+0.25	36.550
6	Sverre Lunde Pedersen	(Norway)	36.73	+0.43	36.730
7	Jan Szymański	(Poland)	36.75	+0.45	36.750
8	Sven Kramer	(Netherlands)	36.81	+0.51	36.810
9	Sergey Trofimov	(Russia)	36.91	+0.61	36.910
10	Andrea Giovannini	(Italy)	36.95	+0.65	36.950
11	Konrád Nagy	(Hungary)	37.04	+0.74	37.040
12	Danil Sinitsyn	(Russia)	37.11	+0.81	37.110
13	Nicola Tumolero	(Italy)	37.19	+0.89	37.190
14	Vitaly Mikhailov	(Belarus)	37.24	+0.94	37.240
15	Bart Swings	(Belgium)	37.33	+1.03	37.330
16	Douwe de Vries	(Netherlands)	37.46	+1.16	37.460
17	Nils van der Poel	(Sweden)	37.97	+1.57	37.970
18	Linus Heidegger	(Austria)	37.88	+1.58	37.880
19	Sebastian Druszkiewicz	(Czech Republic)	38.93	+2.63	38.930
20	Davide Ghiotto	(Italy)	38.94	+2.64	38.940
21	Martin Hänggi	(Switzerland)	38.97	+2.67	38.970
22	Viktor Hald Thorup	(Denmark)	39.06	+2.76	39.060

===== 5000 metres =====
Rank	Skater	Nat.	Time	Behind	Points
1	Sven Kramer	(Netherlands)	6:10.58		37.058
2	Jan Blokhuijsen	(Netherlands)	6:16.86	+6.28	37.686
3	Sverre Lunde Pedersen	(Norway)	6:20.17	+9.59	38.017
4	Andrea Giovannini	(Italy)	6:21.78	+11.20	38.178
5	Bart Swings	(Belgium)	6:21.80	+11.22	38.180
6	Douwe de Vries	(Netherlands)	6:23.00	+12.42	38.300
7	Nils van der Poel	(Sweden)	6:24.57	+13.99	38.457
8	Denis Yuskov	(Russia)	6:26.89	+16.31	38.689
9	Davide Ghiotto	(Italy)	6:28.13	+17.55	38.813
10	Nicola Tumolero	(Italy)	6:29.78	+19.20	38.978
11	Vitaly Mikhailov	(Belarus)	6:32.51	+21.93	39.251
12	Danil Sinitsyn	(Russia)	6:33.02	+22.44	39.302
13	Sebastian Druszkiewicz	(Czech Republic)	6:33.73	+23.15	39.373
14	Simen Spieler Nilsen	(Norway)	6:35.15	+24.57	39.515
15	Sindre Henriksen	(Norway)	6:35.76	+25.18	39.576
16	Viktor Hald Thorup	(Denmark)	6:36.90	+26.32	39.690
17	Sergey Trofimov	(Russia)	6:39.71	+29.13	39.971
18	Martin Hänggi	(Switzerland)	6:42.25	+31.67	40.225
19	Konrad Niedźwiedzki	(Poland)	6:42.89	+32.31	40.289
20	Jan Szymański	(Poland)	6:43.81	+33.23	40.381
21	Konrád Nagy	(Hungary)	7:04.02	+53.44	42.402
22	Linus Heidegger	(Austria)	DQ		-

==== Day 3 ====
===== 1500 metres =====
Rank	Skater	Nat.	Time	Behind	Points
1	Denis Yuskov	(Russia)	1:46.54		35.513
2	Sven Kramer	(Netherlands)	1:46.55	+0.01	35.516
3	Sindre Henriksen	(Norway)	1:47.82	+1.28	35.940
4	Konrad Niedźwiedzki	(Poland)	1:47.83	+1.29	35.943
5	Bart Swings	(Belgium)	1:48.02	+1.48	36.006
6	Sverre Lunde Pedersen	(Norway)	1:48.14	+1.60	36.046
7	Jan Blokhuijsen	(Netherlands)	1:48.31	+1.77	36.103
8	Sergey Trofimov	(Russia)	1:48.34	+1.80	36.113
9	Nicola Tumolero	(Italy)	1:48.46	+1.92	36.153
10	Jan Szymański	(Poland)	1:48.47	+1.93	36.156
11	Douwe de Vries	(Netherlands)	1:48.75	+2.21	36.250
12	Konrád Nagy	(Hungary)	1:49.54	+3.00	36.513
13	Danil Sinitsyn	(Russia)	1:49.61	+3.07	36.536
14	Andrea Giovannini	(Italy)	1:49.82	+3.28	36.606
15	Nils van der Poel	(Sweden)	1:49.83	+3.29	36.610
16	Simen Spieler Nilsen	(Norway)	1:50.06	+3.52	36.686
17	Vitaly Mikhailov	(Belarus)	1:50.69	+4.15	36.896
18	Sebastian Druszkiewicz	(Czech Republic)	1:52.14	+5.60	37.380
19	Davide Ghiotto	(Italy)	1:53.72	+7.18	37.906
20	Viktor Hald Thorup	(Denmark)	1:54.77	+8.23	38.256
21	Martin Hänggi	(Switzerland)	1:56.08	+9.54	38.693

===== 10,000 metres =====
Rank	Skater	Nat.	Time	Behind	Points
1	Sven Kramer	(Netherlands)	13:06.30		39.315
2	Jan Blokhuijsen	(Netherlands)	13:11.95	+5.65	39.597
3	Bart Swings	(Belgium)	13:15.54	+9.24	39.777
4	Douwe de Vries	(Netherlands)	13:24.83	+18.53	40.241
5	Andrea Giovannini	(Italy)	13:41.37	+35.07	41.068
6	Sverre Lunde Pedersen	(Norway)	13:42.81	+36.51	41.140
7	Sindre Henriksen	(Norway)	13:52.95	+46.65	41.647
8	Denis Yuskov	(Russia)	14:04.07	+57.77	42.203

==== Final ranking ====
Rank	Skater	Nat.	500 m	5000 m	1500 m	10,000 m	Points	Behind
1st place, gold medalist(s)	Sven Kramer	(Netherlands)	36.81 (8)	6:10.58 (1)	1:46.55 (2)	13:06.30 (1)	148.699	
2nd place, silver medalist(s)	Jan Blokhuijsen	(Netherlands)	36.43 (2)	6:16.86 (2)	1:48.31 (7)	13:11.95 (2)	149.816	+1.12
3rd place, bronze medalist(s)	Bart Swings	(Belgium)	37.33 (15)	6:21.80 (5)	1:48.02 (5)	13:15.54 (3)	151.293	+2.60
4	Sverre Lunde Pedersen	(Norway)	36.73 (6)	6:20.17 (3)	1:48.14 (6)	13:42.81 (6)	151.933	+3.24
5	Douwe de Vries	(Netherlands)	37.46 (16)	6:23.00 (6)	1:48.75 (11)	13:24.83 (4)	152.251	+3.56
6	Andrea Giovannini	(Italy)	36.95 (10)	6:21.78 (4)	1:49.82 (14)	13:41.37 (5)	152.802	+4.11
7	Denis Yuskov	(Russia)	36.44 (3)	6:26.89 (8)	1:46.54 (1)	14:04.07 (8)	152.845	+4.15
8	Sindre Henriksen	(Norway)	36.30 (1)	6:35.76 (15)	1:47.82 (3)	13:52.95 (7)	153.463	+4.77
9	Nicola Tumolero	(Italy)	37.19 (13)	6:29.78 (10)	1:48.46 (9)		112.321	
10	Konrad Niedźwiedzki	(Poland)	36.50 (4)	6:42.89 (19)	1:47.83 (4)		112.756	
11	Simen Spieler Nilsen	(Norway)	37.02 (14)	6:39.18 (12)	1:48.70 (8)		112.732	
12	Nils van der Poel	(Sweden)	37.87 (17)	6:24.57 (7)	1:49.83 (15)		112.937	
13	Danil Sinitsyn	(Russia)	37.11 (12)	6:33.02 (12)	1:49.61 (13)		112.948	
14	Sergey Trofimov	(Russia)	36.91 (9)	6:39.71 (17)	1:48.34 (8)		112.994	
15	Jan Szymański	(Poland)	36.75 (7)	6:43.81 (20)	1:48.47 (10)		113.287	
16	Vitaly Mikhailov	(Belarus)	37.24 (14)	6:32.51 (11)	1:50.69 (17)		113.387	
17	Davide Ghiotto	(Italy)	38.94 (20)	6:28.13 (9)	1:53.72 (19)		115.659	
18	Sebastian Druszkiewicz	(Czech Republic)	38.93 (19)	6:33.73 (13)	1:52.14 (18)		115.683	
19	Konrád Nagy	(Hungary)	37.04 (11)	7:04.02 (21)	1:49.54 (12)		115.955	
20	Viktor Hald Thorup	(Denmark)	39.06 (22)	6:36.90 (16)	1:54.77 (20)		117.006	
21	Martin Hänggi	(Switzerland)	38.97 (21)	6:42.25 (18)	1:56.08 (21)		117.888	
22	Linus Heidegger	(Austria)	37.88 (18)	DQ (22)			–	+-

=== Women's championships ===
==== Day 1 ====
===== 500 metres =====
Rank	Skater	Nat.	Time	Behind	Points
1	Ireen Wüst	(Netherlands)	39.26		39.260
2	Antoinette de Jong	(Netherlands)	39.56	+0.30	39.560
3	Natalia Czerwonka	(Poland)	39.90	+0.59	39.850
4	Ida Njåtun	(Norway)	39.98	+0.72	39.980
5	Martina Sáblíková	(Czech Republic)	40.18	+0.92	40.180
6	Nikola Zdráhalová	(Czech Republic)	40.26	+1.00	40.260
7	Olga Graf	(Russia)	40.31	+1.05	40.310
8	Sofie-Karoline Haugen	(Norway)	40.57	+1.31	40.570
9	Claudia Pechstein	(Germany)	40.59	+1.33	40.590
10	Francesca Lollobrigida	(Italy)	40.77	+1.51	40.770
11	Katarzyna Bachleda-Curuś	(Poland)	40.80	+1.54	40.800
12	Ellen Bjertnes	(Norway)	40.81	+1.55	40.810
13	Yvonne Nauta	(Netherlands)	40.82	+1.56	40.820
14	Katarzyna Woźniak	(Poland)	41.12	+1.86	41.120
15	Anna Chernova	(Russia)	41.48	+2.22	41.480
16	Jelena Peeters	(Belgium)	41.79	+2.53	41.790
17	Elena Møller-Rigas	(Denmark)	41.98	+2.72	41.980
18	Saskia Alusalu	(Estonia)	42.42	+3.16	42.420
19	Viola Feichtner	(Austria)	43.92	+4.66	43.920

===== 3000 metres =====
Rank	Skater	Nat.	Time	Behind	Points
1	Ireen Wüst	(Netherlands)	4:03.93		40.655
2	Martina Sáblíková	(Czech Republic)	4:04.73	+0.80	40.788
3	Antoinette de Jong	(Netherlands)	4:05.44	+1.51	40.906
4	Anna Chernova	(Russia)	4:06.50	+2.57	41.083
5	Yvonne Nauta	(Netherlands)	4:07.32	+3.39	41.220
6	Olga Graf	(Russia)	4:08.89	+4.96	41.481
7	Claudia Pechstein	(Germany)	4:10.02	+6.09	41.670
8	Natalia Czerwonka	(Poland)	4:12.66	+8.73	42.110
9	Jelena Peeters	(Belgium)	4:13.28	+9.35	42.213
10	Ida Njåtun	(Norway)	4:13.70	+9.77	42.283
11	Katarzyna Woźniak	(Poland)	4:14.31	+10.38	42.385
12	Nikola Zdráhalová	(Czech Republic)	4:15.86	+11.93	42.643
13	Katarzyna Bachleda-Curuś	(Poland)	4:17.56	+13.63	42.926
14	Francesca Lollobrigida	(Italy)	4:18.44	+14.51	43.073
15	Saskia Alusalu	(Estonia)	4:20.03	+16.10	43.338
16	Sofie-Karoline Haugen	(Norway)	4:21.74	+17.81	43.623
17	Viola Feichtner	(Austria)	4:27.94	+24.01	44.656
18	Ellen Bjertnes	(Norway)	4:29.14	+25.21	44.856
19	Elena Møller-Rigas	(Denmark)	4:38.15	+34.22	46.358

==== Day 2 ====
===== 1500 metres =====
Rank	Skater	Nat.	Time	Behind	Points
1	Ireen Wüst	(Netherlands)	1:56.57		38.856
2	Antoinette de Jong	(Netherlands)	1:58.34	+1.77	39.446
3	Martina Sáblíková	(Czech Republic)	1:58.72	+2.15	39.573
4	Yvonne Nauta	(Netherlands)	1:59.06	+2.49	39.686
5	Natalia Czerwonka	(Poland)	1:59.17	+2.60	39.723
6	Olga Graf	(Russia)	1:59.23	+2.66	39.743
7	Ida Njåtun	(Norway)	1:59.77	+3.20	39.923
8	Katarzyna Bachleda-Curuś	(Poland)	2:00.44	+3.87	40.146
9	Claudia Pechstein	(Germany)	2:00.56	+3.99	40.186
10	Katarzyna Woźniak	(Poland)	2:01.07	+4.50	40.356
11	Nikola Zdráhalová	(Czech Republic)	2:02.06	+5.49	40.686
12	Francesca Lollobrigida	(Italy)	2:03.12	+6.55	41.040
13	Jelena Peeters	(Belgium)	2:03.26	+6.69	41.086
14	Sofie-Karoline Haugen	(Norway)	2:03.94	+7.37	41.313
15	Ellen Bjertnes	(Norway)	2:06.91	+10.34	42.303
16	Saskia Alusalu	(Estonia)	2:07.51	+10.94	42.503
17	Anna Chernova	(Russia)	DQ		

===== 5000 metres =====
Rank	Skater	Nat.	Time	Behind	Points
1	Martina Sáblíková	(Czech Republic)	6:57.47		41.747
2	Ireen Wüst	(Netherlands)	7:03.54	+6.07	42.354
3	Yvonne Nauta	(Netherlands)	7:05.41	+7.94	42.541
4	Antoinette de Jong	(Netherlands)	7:07.33	+9.86	42.733
5	Olga Graf	(Russia)	7:11.98	+14.51	43.198
6	Claudia Pechstein	(Germany)	7:12.18	+14.71	43.218
7	Natalia Czerwonka	(Poland)	7:23.87	+26.40	44.387
8	Ida Njåtun	(Norway)	7:27.47	+30.00	44.747

==== Final ranking ====
Rank	Skater	Nat.	500 m	3000 m	1500 m	5000 m	Points	Behind
1st place, gold medalist(s)	Ireen Wüst	(Netherlands)	39.26 (1)	4:03.93 (1)	1:56.57 (1)	7:03.54 (2)	161.125	
2nd place, silver medalist(s)	Martina Sáblíková	(Czech Republic)	40.18 (5)	4:04.73 (2)	1:58.72 (3)	6:57.47 (1)	162.288	+1.17
3rd place, bronze medalist(s)	Antoinette de Jong	(Netherlands)	39.56 (2)	4:05.44 (3)	1:58.34 (2)	7:07.33 (4)	162.645	+1.52
4	Yvonne Nauta	(Netherlands)	40.82 (13)	4:07.32 (5)	1:59.06 (4)	7:05.41 (3)	164.267	+3.15
5	Olga Graf	(Russia)	40.31 (7)	4:08.89 (6)	1:59.23 (6)	7:11.98 (5)	164.732	+3.61
6	Claudia Pechstein	(Germany)	40.59 (9)	4:10.02 (7)	2:00.56 (9)	7:12.18 (6)	165.664	+4.54
7	Natalia Czerwonka	(Poland)	39.85 (3)	4:12.66 (8)	1:59.17 (5)	7:23.87 (7)	166.070	+4.95
8	Ida Njåtun	(Norway)	39.98 (4)	4:13.70 (10)	1:59.77 (7)	7:27.47 (8)	166.933	+5.81
9	Nikola Zdráhalová	(Czech Republic)	40.26 (6)	4:15.86 (12)	2:02.06 (11)		123.589	
10	Katarzyna Woźniak	(Poland)	41.12 (14)	4:14.31 (11)	2:01.07 (10)		123.861	
11	Katarzyna Bachleda-Curuś	(Poland)	40.80 (11)	4:17.56 (13)	2:00.44 (8)		123.872	
12	Francesca Lollobrigida	(Italy)	40.77 (10)	4:18.44 (14)	2:03.12 (12)		124.883	
13	Jelena Peeters	(Belgium)	41.79 (16)	4:13.28 (9)	2:03.26 (13)		125.089	
14	Sofie-Karoline Haugen	(Norway)	40.57 (8)	4:21.74 (16)	2:03.94 (14)		125.506	
15	Ellen Bjertnes	(Norway)	40.81 (12)	4:29.14 (18)	2:06.91 (15)		127.969	
16	Saskia Alusalu	(Estonia)	42.42 (18)	4:20.03 (15)	2:07.51 (16)		128.261	
17	Anna Chernova	(Russia)	41.48 (15)	4:06.50 (4)	DQ (17)		-	+-
18	Elena Møller-Rigas	(Denmark)	41.98 (17)	4:38.15 (19)			88.338	
19	Viola Feichtner	(Austria)	43.92 (19)	4:27.94 (17)			88.576	

== Sprint ==
=== Men's championships ===
DNS = did not start, WDR = withdrew, DQ = disqualified

==== Day 1 ====
===== 500 metres =====
Rank	Skater	Nat.	Time	Behind	Points
1	Ronald Mulder	(Netherlands)	34.87		34.870
2	Ruslan Murashov	(Russia)	34.88	+0.01	34.880
3	Nico Ihle	(Germany)	34.95	+0.08	36.950
4	Kai Verbij	(Netherlands)	34.98	+0.11	36.980
5	Mika Poutala	(Finland)	35.10	+0.23	35.100
6	Håvard Holmefjord Lorentzen	(Norway)	35.16	+0.29	35.160
7	Aleksey Yesin	(Russia)	35.28	+0.41	35.280
8	Piotr Michalski	(Poland)	35.41	+0.54	35.410
9	Kjeld Nuis	(Netherlands)	35.49	+0.62	35.490
10	Espen Aarnes Hvammen	(Norway)	35.54	+0.67	35.540
11	Pekka Koskela	(Finland)	35.58	+0.71	35.580
12	Artur Nogal	(Poland)	35.60	+0.73	35.600
13	Mirko Giacomo Nenzi	(Italy)	35.66	+0.79	35.660
14	Ignat Golovatsiuk	(Belarus)	35.77	+0.90	35.770
15	Mikhail Kazelin	(Russia)	35.86	+0.99	35.860
16	Denny Ihle	(Germany)	35.89	+1.02	35.890
17	Sebastian Klosinski	(Poland)	35.93	+1.06	35.930
18	Luca Zanghellini	(Italy)	36.08	+1.21	36.080
19	David Andersson	(Sweden)	36.15	+1.28	36.150
20	Marten Liiv	(Estonia)	36.44	+1.57	36.440
21	Mathias Vosté	(Belgium)	36.53	+1.66	36.530
22	Samuli Suomalainen	(Finland)	36.71	+1.84	36.710

===== 1000 metres =====
Rank	Skater	Nat.	Time	Behind	Points
1	Kjeld Nuis	(Netherlands)	1:08.77		34.385
2	Kai Verbij	(Netherlands)	1:09.01	+0.24	34.505
3	Håvard Holmefjord Lorentzen	(Norway)	1:09.23	+0.46	34.615
4	Nico Ihle	(Germany)	1:09.45	+0.68	34.725
5	Aleksey Yesin	(Russia)	1:09.48	+0.71	34.740
6	Sebastian Klosinski	(Poland)	1:10.23	+1.46	35.115
7	Piotr Michalski	(Poland)	1:10.34	+1.57	35.170
8	Ronald Mulder	(Netherlands)	1:10.46	+1.69	35.230
9	Mika Poutala	(Finland)	1:10.51	+1.74	35.255
10	Espen Aarnes Hvammen	(Norway)	1:10.78	+2.01	35.390
11	Mikhail Kazelin	(Russia)	1:10.91	+2.14	35.455
12	Marten Liiv	(Estonia)	1:11.14	+2.37	35.570
13	David Andersson	(Sweden)	1:11.41	+2.64	35.705
14	Artur Nogal	(Poland)	1:11.43	+2.66	35.715
15	Pekka Koskela	(Finland)	1:11.50	+2.73	35.750
16	Ignat Golovatsiuk	(Belarus)	1:11.82	+3.05	35.910
17	Denny Ihle	(Germany)	1:12.35	+3.58	36.175
18	Luca Zanghellini	(Italy)	1:12.62	+3.85	36.310
19	Mirko Giacomo Nenzi	(Italy)	1:13.61	+4.84	36.805
20	Mathias Vosté	(Belgium)	1:13.83	+5.06	36.915
21	Samuli Suomalainen	(Finland)	1:14.09	+5.32	37.045
22	Ruslan Murashov	(Russia)	DNS		-

==== Day 2 ====
===== 500 metres =====
Rank	Skater	Nat.	Time	Behind	Points
1	Ronald Mulder	(Netherlands)	35.08		35.080
2	Kai Verbij	(Netherlands)	35.12	+0.04	35.120
3	Aleksey Yesin	(Russia)	35.20	+0.12	35.200
4	Mika Poutala	(Finland)	35.27	+0.19	35.270
5	Espen Aarnes Hvammen	(Norway)	35.30	+0.22	35.300
6	Håvard Holmefjord Lorentzen	(Norway)	35.38	+0.30	35.380
7	Kjeld Nuis	(Netherlands)	35.40	+0.32	35.400
8	Nico Ihle	(Germany)	35.51	+0.43	35.510
9	Piotr Michalski	(Poland)	35.54	+0.46	35.540
10	Pekka Koskela	(Finland)	35.65	+0.57	35.650
11	Artur Nogal	(Poland)	35.70	+0.62	35.700
12	Sebastian Klosinski	(Poland)	35.76	+0.68	35.760
13	Luca Zanghellini	(Italy)	35.79	+0.71	35.790
14	Denny Ihle	(Germany)	35.89	+0.81	35.890
15	Mikhail Kazelin	(Russia)	36.03	+0.95	36.030
16	Mirko Giacomo Nenzi	(Italy)	36.09	+1.01	36.090
17	Ignat Golovatsiuk	(Belarus)	36.19	+1.11	36.190
18	Marten Liiv	(Estonia)	36.43	+1.35	36.430
19	Mathias Vosté	(Belgium)	36.48	+1.40	36.480
20	David Andersson	(Sweden)	36.50	+1.42	36.500
21	Samuli Suomalainen	(Finland)	36.89	+1.81	36.890

===== 1000 metres =====
Rank	Skater	Nat.	Time	Behind	Points
1	Kjeld Nuis	(Netherlands)	1:08.85		34.425
2	Nico Ihle	(Germany)	1:09.20	+0.35	34.600
3	Kai Verbij	(Netherlands)	1:09.25	+0.40	34.625
4	Aleksey Yesin	(Russia)	1:09.34	+0.49	34.670
5	Mika Poutala	(Finland)	1:09.45	+0.60	34.725
6	Håvard Holmefjord Lorentzen	(Norway)	1:09.77	+0.92	34.885
7	Sebastian Klosinski	(Poland)	1:09.85	+1.00	34.925
8	Ronald Mulder	(Netherlands)	1:10.38	+1.53	35.190
9	Piotr Michalski	(Poland)	1:10.93	+2.08	35.465
10	Espen Aarnes Hvammen	(Norway)	1:11.00	+2.15	35.500
11	Pekka Koskela	(Finland)	1:11.32	+2.47	35.660
12	Artur Nogal	(Poland)	1:11.38	+2.53	35.690
13	Ignat Golovatsiuk	(Belarus)	1:11.66	+2.81	35.830
14	Marten Liiv	(Estonia)	1:11.67	+2.82	35.835
15	Denny Ihle	(Germany)	1:11.83	+2.98	35.915
16	Mikhail Kazelin	(Russia)	1:12.05	+3.20	36.025
17	Luca Zanghellini	(Italy)	1:12.37	+3.52	36.185
18	Mirko Giacomo Nenzi	(Italy)	1:13.22	+4.37	36.610
19	Samuli Suomalainen	(Finland)	1:14.46	+5.61	37.230
20	Mathias Vosté	(Belgium)	DNS		-
21	David Andersson	(Sweden)	WDR		-

==== Final ranking ====
Rank	Skater	Nat.	500 m	1000 m	500 m	1000 m	Points	Behind
1st place, gold medalist(s)	Kai Verbij	(Netherlands)	34.98 (4)	1:09.01 (2)	35.12 (2)	1:09.25 (3)	139.230	
2nd place, silver medalist(s)	Kjeld Nuis	(Netherlands)	35.49 (9)	1:08.77 (1)	35.40 (7)	1:08.85 (1)	139.700	+0.47
3rd place, bronze medalist(s)	Nico Ihle	(Germany)	34.95 (3)	1:09.45 (4)	35.51 (8)	1:09.20 (2)	139.785	+0.56
4	Aleksey Yesin	(Russia)	35.28 (7)	1:09.48 (5)	35.20 (3)	1:09.34 (4)	139.890	+0.66
5	Håvard Holmefjord Lorentzen	(Norway)	35.16 (6)	1:09.23 (3)	35.38 (6)	1:09.77 (6)	140.040	+0.81
6	Mika Poutala	(Finland)	35.10 (5)	1:10.51 (9)	35.27 (4)	1:09.45 (5)	140.350	+1.12
7	Ronald Mulder	(Netherlands)	34.87 (1)	1:10.46 (8)	35.08 (1)	1:10.38 (8)	140.370	+1.14
8	Piotr Michalski	(Poland)	35.41 (8)	1:10.34 (7)	35.54 (9)	1:10.93 (9)	141.585	+2.36
9	Espen Aarnes Hvammen	(Norway)	35.54 (10)	1:10.78 (10)	35.30 (5)	1:11.00 (10)	141.730	+2.50
10	Sebastian Klosinski	(Poland)	35.93 (17)	1:10.23 (6)	35.76 (12)	1:09.85 (7)	141.730	+2.50
11	Pekka Koskela	(Finland)	35.58 (11)	1:11.50 (15)	35.65 (10)	1:11.32 (11)	142.640	+3.41
12	Artur Nogal	(Poland)	35.60 (12)	1:11.43 (14)	35.70 (11)	1:11.38 (12)	142.705	+3.48
13	Mikhail Kazelin	(Russia)	35.86 (15)	1:10.91 (11)	36.03 (15)	1:12.05 (16)	143.370	+4.14
14	Ignat Golovatsiuk	(Belarus)	35.77 (14)	1:11.82 (16)	36.19 (17)	1:11.66 (13)	143.700	+4.47
15	Denny Ihle	(Germany)	35.89 (16)	1:12.35 (17)	35.89 (14)	1:11.83 (15)	143.870	+4.64
16	Marten Liiv	(Estonia)	36.44 (20)	1:11.14 (12)	36.43 (18)	1:11.67 (14)	144.275	+5.05
17	Luca Zanghellini	(Italy)	36.08 (18)	1:12.62 (18)	35.79 (13)	1:12.37 (17)	144.365	+5.14
18	Mirko Giacomo Nenzi	(Italy)	35.66 (13)	1:13.61 (19)	36.09 (16)	1:13.22 (18)	145.165	+5.94
19	Samuli Suomalainen	(Finland)	36.71 (22)	1:14.09 (21)	36.89 (21)	1:14.46 (19)	147.875	+8.65
20	Mathias Vosté	(Belgium)	36.53 (21)	1:13.83 (20)	36.48 (19)	DNS (20)	-	+-
21	David Andersson	(Sweden)	36.15 (19)	1:11.41 (13)	36.50 (20)	WDR (21)	-	+-
22	Ruslan Murashov	(Russia)	34.88 (2)	DNS (22)			–	+-

=== Women's championships ===
==== Day 2 ====
===== 500 metres =====
Rank	Skater	Nat.	Time	Behind	Points
1	Olga Fatkulina	(Russia)	38.16		38.160
2	Karolina Erbanova	(Czech Republic)	38.23	+0.07	38.230
3	Marrit Leenstra	(Netherlands)	38.55	+0.39	38.550
4	Jorien ter Mors	(Netherlands)	38.75	+0.59	38.750
5	Hege Bøkko	(Norway)	38.81	+0.65	38.810
6	Gabriele Hirschbichler	(Germany)	38.93	+0.77	38.930
7	Yekaterina Shikhova	(Russia)	38.95	+0.79	38.950
8	Vanessa Herzog	(Austria)	38.97	+0.81	38.970
9	Yekaterina Lobysheva	(Russia)	39.11	+0.95	39.110
10	Sanneke de Neeling	(Netherlands)	39.14	+0.98	39.140
11	Martine Ripsrud	(Norway)	39.39	+1.23	39.390
12	Elina Risku	(Finland)	39.86	+1.70	39.860
13	Kaja Ziomek	(Poland)	40.05	+1.89	40.050
14	Tatsiana Mikhailava	(Belarus)	40.53	+2.37	40.530
15	Francesca Bettrone	(Italy)	40.69	+2.53	40.690
16	Roxanne Dufter	(Germany)	40.75	+2.59	40.750
17	Andzelika Wójcik	(Poland)	40.82	+2.66	40.820

===== 1000 metres =====
Rank	Skater	Nat.	Time	Behind	Points
1	Jorien ter Mors	(Netherlands)	1:15.58		37.790
2	Karolina Erbanova	(Czech Republic)	1:15.69	+0.11	37.845
3	Marrit Leenstra	(Netherlands)	1:15.95	+0.37	37.975
4	Olga Fatkulina	(Russia)	1:16.15	+0.57	38.075
5	Yekaterina Lobysheva	(Russia)	1:16.27	+0.69	38.135
6	Yekaterina Shikhova	(Russia)	1:16.37	+0.79	38.185
7	Sanneke de Neeling	(Netherlands)	1:16.87	+1.29	38.435
8	Hege Bøkko	(Norway)	1:17.06	+1.48	38.530
9	Roxanne Dufter	(Germany)	1:18.08	+2.50	39.040
10	Gabriele Hirschbichler	(Germany)	1:18.22	+2.64	39.110
11	Vanessa Herzog	(Austria)	1:18.51	+2.93	39.255
12	Tatsiana Mikhailava	(Belarus)	1:19.72	+4.14	39.860
13	Francesca Bettrone	(Italy)	1:19.75	+4.17	39.875
14	Martine Ripsrud	(Norway)	1:20.01	+4.43	40.005
15	Andzelika Wójcik	(Poland)	1:20.89	+5.31	40.445
16	Kaja Ziomek	(Poland)	1:21.05	+5.47	40.525
17	Elina Risku	(Finland)	1:23.20	+7.62	41.600

==== Day 3 ====
===== 500 metres =====
Rank	Skater	Nat.	Time	Behind	Points
1	Olga Fatkulina	(Russia)	38.07		38.070
2	Karolina Erbanova	(Czech Republic)	38.19	+0.12	38.190
3	Jorien ter Mors	(Netherlands)	38.29	+0.22	38.290
4	Sanneke de Neeling	(Netherlands)	38.77	+0.70	38.770
5	Hege Bøkko	(Norway)	38.78	+0.71	38.780
6	Vanessa Herzog	(Austria)	38.82	+0.75	38.820
7	Marrit Leenstra	(Netherlands)	38.88	+0.81	38.880
8	Yekaterina Shikhova	(Russia)	38.91	+0.84	38.910
9	Martine Ripsrud	(Norway)	39.27	+1.20	39.270
10	Gabriele Hirschbichler	(Germany)	39.38	+1.31	39.380
11	Elina Risku	(Finland)	39.98	+1.91	39.980
12	Kaja Ziomek	(Poland)	40.09	+2.02	40.090
13	Francesca Bettrone	(Italy)	40.34	+2.27	40.340
13	Roxanne Dufter	(Germany)	40.34	+2.27	40.340
15	Tatsiana Mikhailava	(Belarus)	40.35	+2.28	40.350
16	Andzelika Wójcik	(Poland)	40.67	+2.60	40.670
17	Yekaterina Lobysheva	(Russia)	WDR		–

===== 1000 metres =====
Rank	Skater	Nat.	Time	Behind	Points
1	Jorien ter Mors	(Netherlands)	1:14.88		37.440
2	Karolina Erbanova	(Czech Republic)	1:15.83	+0.95	37.915
3	Marrit Leenstra	(Netherlands)	1:16.35	+1.47	38.175
4	Olga Fatkulina	(Russia)	1:16.46	+1.58	38.230
5	Sanneke de Neeling	(Netherlands)	1:16.74	+1.86	38.370
6	Hege Bøkko	(Norway)	1:16.95	+2.07	38.475
7	Yekaterina Shikhova	(Russia)	1:17.22	+2.34	38.610
8	Roxanne Dufter	(Germany)	1:18.01	+3.13	39.005
9	Vanessa Herzog	(Austria)	1:18.17	+3.29	39.085
10	Gabriele Hirschbichler	(Germany)	1:18.80	+3.92	39.400
11	Francesca Bettrone	(Italy)	1:19.72	+4.84	39.860
12	Martine Ripsrud	(Norway)	1:19.87	+4.99	39.935
13	Tatsiana Mikhailava	(Belarus)	1:20.70	+5.82	40.350
14	Kaja Ziomek	(Poland)	1:21.01	+6.13	40.505
15	Andzelika Wójcik	(Poland)	1:21.27	+6.39	40.635
16	Elina Risku	(Finland)	1:22.82	+7.94	41.410

==== Final ranking ====
Rank	Skater	Nat.	500 m	1000 m	500 m	1000 m	Points	Behind
1st place, gold medalist(s)	Karolina Erbanova	(Czech Republic)	38.23 (2)	1:15.69 (2)	38.19 (2)	1:15.83 (2)	152.180	
2nd place, silver medalist(s)	Jorien ter Mors	(Netherlands)	38.75 (4)	1:15.58 (1)	38.29 (3)	1:14.88 (1)	152.270	+0.09
3rd place, bronze medalist(s)	Olga Fatkulina	(Russia)	38.16 (1)	1:16.15 (4)	38.07 (1)	1:16.46 (4)	152.535	+0.36
4	Marrit Leenstra	(Netherlands)	38.55 (3)	1:15.95 (3)	38.88 (7)	1:16.35 (3)	153.580	+1.40
5	Hege Bøkko	(Norway)	38.81 (5)	1:17.06 (8)	38.78 (5)	1:16.95 (6)	154.595	+2.42
6	Yekaterina Shikhova	(Russia)	38.95 (7)	1:16.37 (6)	38.91 (8)	1:17.22 (7)	154.655	+2.48
7	Sanneke de Neeling	(Netherlands)	39.14 (10)	1:16.87 (7)	38.77 (4)	1:16.74 (5)	154.715	+2.54
8	Vanessa Herzog	(Austria)	38.97 (8)	1:18.51 (11)	38.82 (6)	1:18.17 (9)	156.130	+3.95
9	Gabriele Hirschbichler	(Germany)	38.93 (6)	1:18.22 (10)	39.38 (10)	1:18.80 (10)	156.820	+4.64
10	Martine Ripsrud	(Norway)	39.39 (11)	1:20.01 (14)	39.27 (9)	1:19.87 (12)	158.600	+6.42
11	Roxanne Dufter	(Germany)	40.75 (16)	1:18.08 (9)	40.34 (13)	1:18.01 (8)	159.135	+6.96
12	Francesca Bettrone	(Italy)	40.69 (15)	1:19.75 (13)	40.34 (13)	1:19.72 (11)	160.765	+8.59
13	Tatsiana Mikhailava	(Belarus)	40.53 (14)	1:19.72 (12)	40.35 (15)	1:20.70 (13)	161.090	+8.91
14	Kaja Ziomek	(Poland)	40.05 (13)	1:21.05 (16)	40.09 (12)	1:21.01 (14)	161.170	+8.99
15	Andzelika Wójcik	(Poland)	40.82 (17)	1:20.89 (15)	40.67 (16)	1:21.27 (15)	162.570	+10.39
16	Elina Risku	(Finland)	39.86 (12)	1:23.20 (17)	39.98 (11)	1:22.82 (16)	162.850	+10.67
17	Yekaterina Lobysheva	(Russia)	39.11 (9)	1:16.27 (5)	WDR (17)		-	+-

== See also ==
- 2017 World Allround Speed Skating Championships
- 2017 World Sprint Speed Skating Championships
