= 2020 European Speed Skating Championships – Women's 1500 metres =

Women's 1500 metres at the 2020 European Speed Skating Championships
- Venue: Thialf
- Location: Heerenveen, Netherlands
- Dates: 10 January
- Competitors: 19 from 8 nations
- Winning time: 1:54.88

Medalists
gold medal	Ireen Wüst	Netherlands
silver medal	Evgeniia Lalenkova	Russia
bronze medal	Yekaterina Shikhova	Russia

The women's 1500 metres competition at the 2020 European Speed Skating Championships was held on 10 January 2020.

== Results ==
The race was started at 19:30.

Rank	Pair	Lane	Name	Country	Time	Diff
1st place, gold medalist(s)	8	i	Ireen Wüst	Netherlands	1:54.88	
2nd place, silver medalist(s)	5	o	Evgeniia Lalenkova	Russia	1:55.22	+0.34
3rd place, bronze medalist(s)	10	i	Yekaterina Shikhova	Russia	1:55.31	+0.43
4	9	i	Melissa Wijfje	Netherlands	1:55.42	+0.54
5	8	o	Martina Sáblíková	Czech Republic	1:55.52	+0.64
6	6	o	Elizaveta Kazelina	Russia	1:55.77	+0.89
7	10	o	Joy Beune	Netherlands	1:56.41	+1.53
8	6	i	Nikola Zdráhalová	Czech Republic	1:56.82	+1.94
9	7	o	Natalia Czerwonka	Poland	1:57.05	+2.17
10	7	i	Francesca Lollobrigida	Italy	1:57.15	+2.27
11	5	i	Noemi Bonazza	Italy	1:57.52	+2.64
12	9	o	Ida Njåtun	Norway	1:58.44	+3.56
13	4	o	Roxanne Dufter	Germany	1:59.44	+4.56
14	3	o	Karolina Bosiek	Poland	2:00.00	+5.12
15	2	o	Sofie Karoline Haugen	Norway	2:00.89	+6.01
16	3	i	Michelle Uhrig	Germany	2:01.31	+6.43
17	2	i	Ragne Wiklund	Norway	2:01.50	+6.62
18	1	i	Ellia Smeding	Great Britain	2:02.52	+7.64
19	4	i	Karolina Gąsecka	Poland	2:02.73	+7.85
