= 2015 World Allround Speed Skating Championships – Women =

Women at the 2015 World Allround Speed Skating Championships
- Date: 7–8 March 2015
- Competitors: 24 from 13 nations
- Winning points: 157.717

Medalists
gold medal	Martina Sáblíková	Czech Republic
silver medal	Ireen Wüst	Netherlands
bronze medal	Ida Njåtun	Norway

The Women event of the 2015 World Allround Speed Skating Championships was held on 7–8 March 2015.

== Results ==
=== 500 m ===
The race was started at 12:04.

Rank	Pair	Lane	Name	Country	Time	Diff
1	11	i	Heather Richardson	USA	37.11	
2	10	o	Kali Christ	CAN	38.67	+1.56
3	9	i	Ireen Wüst	NED	38.73	+1.62
4	10	i	Ivanie Blondin	CAN	38.93	+1.82
5	7	o	Zhao Xin	CHN	38.98	+1.87
6	12	i	Ida Njåtun	NOR	39.01	+1.90
7	9	o	Ayaka Kikuchi	JPN	39.04	+1.93
8	11	o	Nana Takagi	JPN	39.18	+2.07
9	12	o	Yuliya Skokova	RUS	39.22	+2.11
10	8	i	Martina Sáblíková	CZE	39.23	+2.12
11	7	i	Marije Joling	NED	39.24	+2.13
11	5	i	Miho Takagi	JPN	39.24	+2.13
13	5	o	Linda de Vries	NED	39.26	+2.15
14	6	o	Luiza Złotkowska	POL	39.52	+2.41
15	6	i	Liu Jing	CHN	39.62	+2.51
16	8	o	Natalya Voronina	RUS	39.77	+2.66
17	1	i	Claudia Pechstein	GER	40.00	+2.89
17	4	o	Francesca Lollobrigida	ITA	40.00	+2.89
19	2	i	Hao Jiachen	CHN	40.06	+2.95
20	2	o	Olga Graf	RUS	40.12	+3.01
21	4	i	Marina Zueva	BLR	40.45	+3.34
22	1	o	Kim Bo-reum	KOR	40.68	+3.57
23	3	o	Leia Behlau	GER	41.40	+4.29
24	3	i	Frida van Megen	NOR	41.74	+4.63

=== 3000 m ===
The race was started at 13:23.

Rank	Pair	Lane	Name	Country	Time	Diff
1	9	i	Martina Sáblíková	CZE	3:55.10	
2	11	i	Ireen Wüst	NED	4:00.34	+5.24
3	12	i	Linda de Vries	NED	4:02.41	+7.31
4	9	o	Marije Joling	NED	4:02.85	+7.75
5	10	o	Claudia Pechstein	GER	4:02.93	+7.83
6	12	o	Ivanie Blondin	CAN	4:04.03	+8.93
7	5	i	Natalya Voronina	RUS	4:04.54	+9.44
8	6	i	Ida Njåtun	NOR	4:04.90	+9.79
9	10	i	Heather Richardson	USA	4:05.00	+9.89
10	5	o	Luiza Złotkowska	POL	4:06.79	+11.69
11	8	i	Kali Christ	CAN	4:06.99	+11.89
12	4	i	Miho Takagi	JPN	4:07.11	+12.01
13	6	o	Nana Takagi	JPN	4:07.60	+12.50
14	7	o	Ayaka Kikuchi	JPN	4:08.88	+13.78
15	4	o	Francesca Lollobrigida	ITA	4:09.50	+14.40
16	8	o	Kim Bo-reum	KOR	4:10.00	+14.90
17	11	o	Olga Graf	RUS	4:10.64	+15.54
18	3	i	Frida van Megen	NOR	4:11.28	+16.18
19	3	o	Zhao Xin	CHN	4:11.92	+16.82
20	2	i	Marina Zueva	BLR	4:12.05	+16.95
21	2	o	Leia Behlau	GER	4:12.38	+17.28
22	7	i	Yuliya Skokova	RUS	4:12.89	+17.79
23	1	o	Hao Jiachen	CHN	4:13.00	+17.90
24	1	i	Liu Jing	CHN	4:17.26	+22.16

=== 1500 m ===
The race was started at 11:00.

Rank	Pair	Lane	Name	Country	Time	Diff
1	9	i	Ida Njåtun	NOR	1:52.71	
2	12	i	Heather Richardson	USA	1:54.23	+1.52
3	11	i	Ireen Wüst	NED	1:54.28	+1.57
4	9	o	Kali Christ	CAN	1:54.44	+1.73
5	12	o	Martina Sáblíková	CZE	1:54.55	+1.84
6	10	i	Linda de Vries	NED	1:55.57	+2.86
7	5	o	Yuliya Skokova	RUS	1:56.30	+3.59
8	7	i	Claudia Pechstein	GER	1:56.35	+3.64
9	8	o	Nana Takagi	JPN	1:56.46	+3.75
10	6	o	Luiza Złotkowska	POL	1:56.50	+3.79
11	8	i	Miho Takagi	JPN	1:56.83	+4.12
12	11	o	Ivanie Blondin	CAN	1:56.85	+4.14
13	5	i	Zhao Xin	CHN	1:57.44	+4.73
14	7	o	Ayaka Kikuchi	JPN	1:57.61	+4.90
15	6	i	Natalya Voronina	RUS	1:58.11	+5.40
16	10	o	Marije Joling	NED	1:58.86	+6.15
16	3	i	Kim Bo-reum	KOR	1:58.86	+6.15
18	4	i	Francesca Lollobrigida	ITA	1:59.59	+6.88
19	2	o	Leia Behlau	GER	1:59.96	+7.25
20	4	o	Hao Jiachen	CHN	2:00.11	+7.39
21	2	i	Liu Jing	CHN	2:00.35	+7.64
22	3	o	Marina Zueva	BLR	2:01.09	+8.38
23	1	i	Frida van Megen	NOR	2:02.34	+9.63

=== 5000 m ===
The race was started at 13:05.

Rank	Pair	Lane	Name	Country	Time	Diff
1	3	i	Martina Sáblíková	CZE	6:51.21	
2	1	i	Linda de Vries	NED	7:03.43	+12.22
3	3	o	Ireen Wüst	NED	7:03.99	+12.78
4	4	i	Ida Njåtun	NOR	7:04.00	+12.79
5	2	i	Ivanie Blondin	CAN	7:06.99	+15.78
6	1	o	Marije Joling	NED	7:08.80	+17.59
7	4	o	Heather Richardson	USA	7:20.27	+29.06
8	2	o	Kali Christ	CAN	7:24.10	+32.89

=== Overall standings ===
After all events.

Rank	Name	Country	Points	Diff
1st place, gold medalist(s)	Martina Sáblíková	CZE	157.717	
2nd place, silver medalist(s)	Ireen Wüst	NED	159.278	+1.57
3rd place, bronze medalist(s)	Ida Njåtun	NOR	159.795	+2.08
4	Heather Richardson	USA	160.046	+2.33
5	Linda de Vries	NED	160.527	+2.81
6	Ivanie Blondin	CAN	161.250	+3.54
7	Marije Joling	NED	162.215	+4.50
8	Kali Christ	CAN	162.391	+4.68
9	Nana Takagi	JPN	119.266	
10	Claudia Pechstein	GER	119.271	
11	Miho Takagi	JPN	119.368	
12	Luiza Złotkowska	POL	119.484	
13	Ayaka Kikuchi	JPN	119.723	
14	Natalya Voronina	RUS	119.896	
15	Zhao Xin	CHN	120.112	
16	Yuliya Skokova	RUS	120.134	
17	Francesca Lollobrigida	ITA	121.446	
18	Kim Bo-reum	KOR	121.966	
19	Hao Jiachen	CHN	122.259	
20	Liu Jing	CHN	122.612	
21	Marina Zueva	BLR	122.821	
22	Leia Behlau	GER	123.449	
23	Frida van Megen	NOR	124.400	
	Olga Graf	RUS		
