= 2011 World Single Distance Speed Skating Championships – Women's 1000 metres =

The Women's 1000m race of the 2011 World Single Distance Speed Skating Championships was held on March 12 at 12:00 local time.

== Results ==
Rank	Pair	Lane	Name	Country	Time	Time Behind	Notes
1st place, gold medalist(s)	12	i	Christine Nesbitt	Canada	1:14.84		
2nd place, silver medalist(s)	10	o	Ireen Wüst	Netherlands	1:15.42	+0.58	
3rd place, bronze medalist(s)	12	o	Heather Richardson	United States	1:15.45	+0.61	
4	9	i	Marrit Leenstra	Netherlands	1:16.38	+1.54	
5	3	i	Yekaterina Shikhova	Russia	1:16.56	+1.72	
6	11	i	Margot Boer	Netherlands	1:16.90	+2.06	
7	4	i	Zhang Hong	China	1:17.09	+2.25	
8	6	i	Yekaterina Aydova	Kazakhstan	1:17.19	+2.35	
9	4	o	Yekaterina Lobysheva	Russia	1:17.25	+2.41	
10	8	i	Brittany Schussler	Canada	1:17.29	+2.45	
11	3	o	Hege Bøkko	Norway	1:17.31	+2.47	
12	5	o	Ida Njåtun	Norway	1:17.31	+2.47	
13	8	o	Monique Angermüller	Germany	1:17.33	+2.49	
14	9	o	Judith Hesse	Germany	1:17.35	+ 2.51	
15	10	i	Shannon Rempel	Canada	1:17.44	+2.60	
16	11	o	Nao Kodaira	Japan	1:17.61	+2.77	
17	1	i	Karolína Erbanová	Czech Republic	1:17.79	+2.95	
18	6	o	Miho Takagi	Japan	1:17.86	+3.02	
19	7	o	Maki Tsuji	Japan	1:17.89	+3.05	
20	7	i	Gabriele Hirschbichler	Germany	1:18.03	+3.19	
21	5	i	Chiara Simionato	Italy	1:18.12	+3.28	
22	1	o	Yevgenia Dmitrieva	Russia	1:18.23	+3.39	
23	2	o	Rebekah Bradford	United States	1:18.74	+3.90	
24	2	i	Natalia Czerwonka	Poland	1:18.78	+3.94	
