= 2015 World Single Distance Speed Skating Championships – Women's 1500 metres =

Women's 1500 metres at the 2015 World Single Distance Speed Skating Championships
- Venue: Thialf, Heerenveen
- Date: 15 February 2015
- Competitors: 23 from 12 nations
- Winning time: 1:54.27

Medalists
gold medal	Brittany Bowe	United States
silver medal	Ireen Wüst	Netherlands
bronze medal	Heather Richardson	United States

The Women's 1500 metres race of the 2015 World Single Distance Speed Skating Championships was held on 15 February 2015.

== Results ==
The race was started at 13:58.

Rank	Pair	Lane	Name	Country	Time	Diff
1st place, gold medalist(s)	10	i	Brittany Bowe	USA	1:54.27	
2nd place, silver medalist(s)	11	o	Ireen Wüst	NED	1:54.76	+0.49
3rd place, bronze medalist(s)	12	o	Heather Richardson	USA	1:55.60	+1.33
4	9	o	Martina Sáblíková	CZE	1:55.65	+1.38
5	11	i	Marrit Leenstra	NED	1:55.90	+1.63
6	9	i	Marije Joling	NED	1:56.85	+2.58
7	12	i	Ida Njåtun	NOR	1:57.79	+3.52
8	8	o	Kali Christ	CAN	1:57.82	+3.55
9	7	o	Luiza Złotkowska	POL	1:58.22	+3.95
10	8	i	Yuliya Skokova	RUS	1:58.25	+3.98
11	10	o	Olga Graf	RUS	1:58.57	+4.30
12	5	i	Ayaka Kikuchi	JPN	1:59.12	+4.85
13	5	o	Zhao Xin	CHN	1:59.12	+4.85
14	6	o	Gabriele Hirschbichler	GER	1:59.49	+5.22
15	7	i	Nana Takagi	JPN	1:59.68	+5.41
16	3	o	Margarita Ryzhova	RUS	1:59.93	+5.66
17	3	i	Noh Seon-yeong	KOR	2:00.18	+5.91
18	4	i	Isabell Ost	GER	2:00.91	+6.64
19	2	i	Maki Tabata	JPN	2:01.02	+6.75
20	6	i	Katarzyna Woźniak	POL	2:01.31	+7.04
21	4	o	Tatyana Mikhailova	BLR	2:01.61	+7.34
22	1	i	Liu Jing	CHN	2:02.60	+8.33
23	2	o	Josie Spence	CAN	2:03.11	+8.84
