= 2021 World Single Distances Speed Skating Championships – Women's 1500 metres =

Women's 1500 metres at the 2021 World Single Distances Speed Skating Championships
- Venue: Thialf
- Location: Heerenveen, Netherlands
- Date: 14 February
- Competitors: 24 from 12 nations
- Winning time: 1:54.613

Medalists
gold medal	Ragne Wiklund	Norway
silver medal	Brittany Bowe	United States
bronze medal	Evgeniia Lalenkova

The Women's 1500 metres competition at the 2021 World Single Distances Speed Skating Championships was held on 14 February 2021.

== Results ==
The race was started at 12:35.

Rank	Pair	Lane	Name	Country	Time	Diff
1st place, gold medalist(s)	7	i	Ragne Wiklund	Norway	1:54.613	
2nd place, silver medalist(s)	10	i	Brittany Bowe	United States	1:55.034	+0.42
3rd place, bronze medalist(s)	10	o	Evgeniia Lalenkova	Russian Skating Union	1:55.099	+0.48
4	12	o	Antoinette de Jong	Netherlands	1:55.362	+0.74
5	12	i	Ireen Wüst	Netherlands	1:55.880	+1.26
6	9	i	Natalia Czerwonka	Poland	1:55.892	+1.27
7	11	o	Elizaveta Golubeva	Russian Skating Union	1:55.898	+1.28
8	6	o	Yekaterina Aydova	Kazakhstan	1:56.079	+1.46
9	8	o	Melissa Wijfje	Netherlands	1:56.310	+1.69
10	11	i	Nadezhda Morozova	Kazakhstan	1:57.024	+2.41
11	7	o	Daria Kachanova	Russian Skating Union	1:57.075	+2.46
12	8	i	Francesca Lollobrigida	Italy	1:57.290	+2.67
13	4	i	Valérie Maltais	Canada	1:57.417	+2.80
14	9	o	Nikola Zdráhalová	Czech Republic	1:58.602	+3.98
15	5	i	Karolina Bosiek	Poland	1:58.696	+4.08
16	2	o	Béatrice Lamarche	Canada	1:58.995	+4.38
17	6	i	Ekaterina Sloeva	Belarus	2:00.024	+5.41
18	4	o	Sofie Karoline Haugen	Norway	2:00.164	+5.55
19	3	o	Mareike Thum	Germany	2:00.234	+5.62
20	5	o	Ida Njåtun	Norway	2:00.255	+5.64
21	1	i	Abigail McCluskey	Canada	2:01.255	+6.64
22	2	i	Linda Rossi	Italy	2:01.998	+7.38
23	3	i	Tatsiana Mikhailava	Belarus	2:04.105	+9.49
24	1	o	Sandrine Tas	Belgium	2:05.154	+10.54
