= 2020 World Single Distances Speed Skating Championships – Women's 1500 metres =

Women's 1500 metres at the 2020 World Single Distances Speed Skating Championships
- Venue: Utah Olympic Oval
- Location: Salt Lake City, United States
- Dates: February 16
- Competitors: 24 from 12 nations
- Winning time: 1:50.92

Medalists
gold medal	Ireen Wüst	Netherlands
silver medal	Evgeniia Lalenkova	Russia
bronze medal	Elizaveta Kazelina	Russia

The Women's 1500 metres competition at the 2020 World Single Distances Speed Skating Championships was held on February 16, 2020.

== Results ==
The race was started at 12:30.

Rank	Pair	Lane	Name	Country	Time	Diff
1st place, gold medalist(s)	10	o	Ireen Wüst	Netherlands	1:50.92	
2nd place, silver medalist(s)	10	i	Evgeniia Lalenkova	Russia	1:51.13	+0.21
3rd place, bronze medalist(s)	12	o	Elizaveta Kazelina	Russia	1:51.41	+0.49
4	8	i	Miho Takagi	Japan	1:51.58	+0.66
5	12	i	Melissa Wijfje	Netherlands	1:51.78	+0.86
6	11	o	Yekaterina Shikhova	Russia	1:52.07	+1.15
7	8	o	Ivanie Blondin	Canada	1:52.43	+1.51
8	6	i	Nana Takagi	Japan	1:52.72	+1.80
9	9	i	Nao Kodaira	Japan	1:52.82	+1.90
10	1	o	Joy Beune	Netherlands	1:53.11	+2.19
11	9	o	Natalia Czerwonka	Poland	1:53.56	+2.64
12	3	i	Roxanne Dufter	Germany	1:53.96	+3.04
13	5	o	Francesca Lollobrigida	Italy	1:54.13	+3.21
14	11	i	Brittany Bowe	United States	1:54.20	+3.28
15	7	o	Nikola Zdráhalová	Czech Republic	1:54.24	+3.32
16	6	o	Isabelle Weidemann	Canada	1:54.32	+3.40
17	4	i	Zhao Xin	China	1:54.49	+3.57
18	2	o	Karolina Bosiek	Poland	1:55.02	+4.10
19	2	i	Abigail McCluskey	Canada	1:55.19	+4.27
20	5	i	Marina Zueva	Belarus	1:55.257	+4.33
21	3	o	Kimi Goetz	United States	1:55.259	+4.33
22	1	i	Yin Qi	China	1:55.49	+4.57
23	4	o	Nadezhda Morozova	Kazakhstan	1:56.22	+5.30
24	7	i	Han Mei	China	1:56.88	+5.96
