= Ireen Wüst =

Dutch speed skater

Ireen Wüst OLY
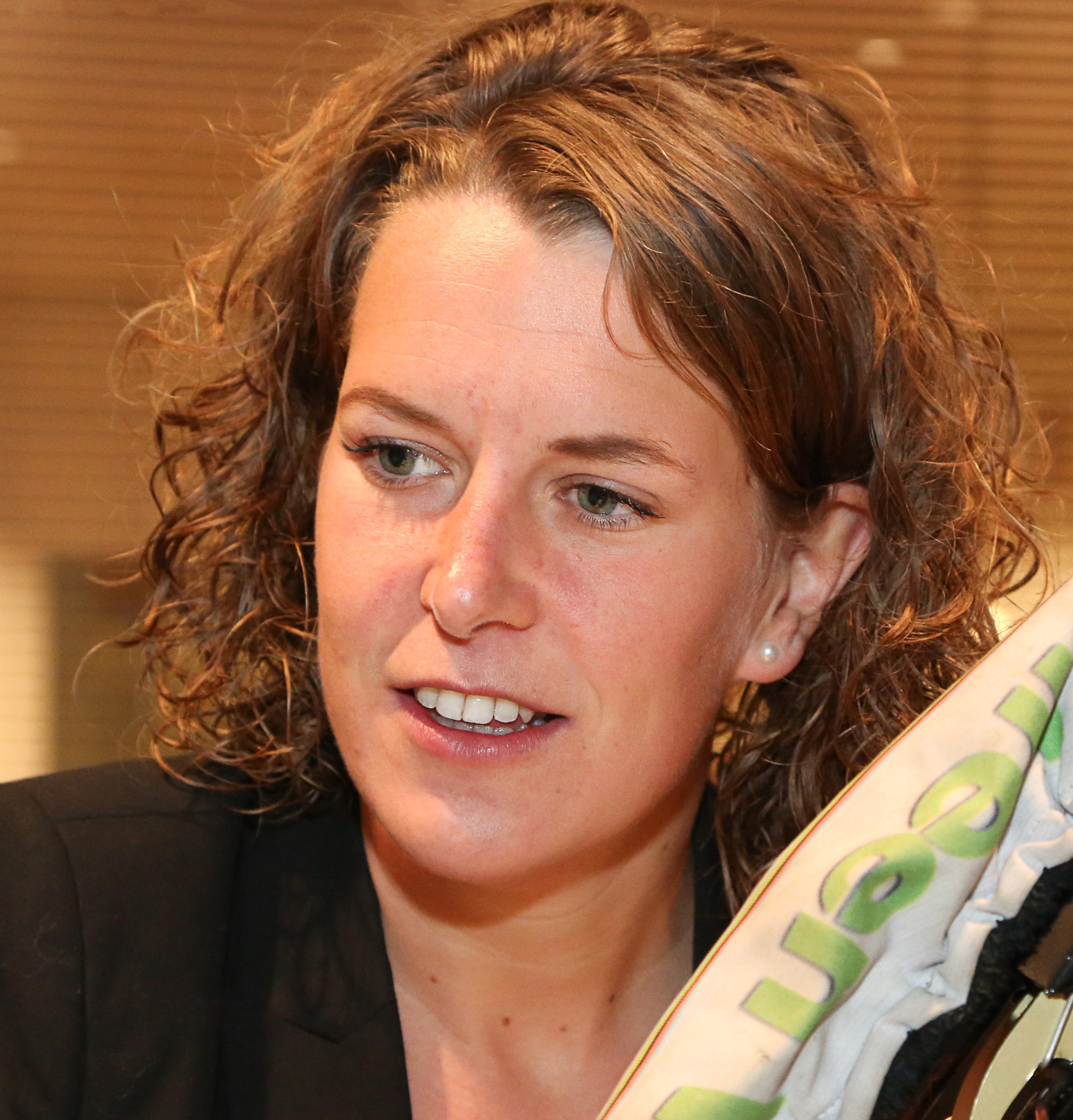
- Wüst in 2013

Personal information
- Nationality: Dutch
- Born: 1 April 1986 (age 40) Goirle, Netherlands
- Height: 1.68 m (5 ft 6 in)
- Weight: 63 kg (139 lb)
- Website: ireenwust.nl

Sport
- Country: Netherlands
- Sport: Speed skating
- Events: 1000 m, 1500 m, 3000 m, 5000 m
- Club: IJsclub Tilburg; TVM Schaatsploeg; Reggeborgh
- Turned pro: 2005
- Retired: 2022
Medal record
Speed skating
Representing the Netherlands
Event	1st	2nd	3rd
Olympic Games	6	5	2
World Allround	7	4	2
World Sprint	0	1	0
World Distance	15	15	1
European Allround	5	4	2
European Distance	3	2	0
Total	36	31	7
Olympic Games
Gold medal – first place	2006 Turin	3000 m
Gold medal – first place	2010 Vancouver	1500 m
Gold medal – first place	2014 Sochi	3000 m
Gold medal – first place	2014 Sochi	Team pursuit
Gold medal – first place	2018 Pyeongchang	1500 m
Gold medal – first place	2022 Beijing	1500 m
Silver medal – second place	2014 Sochi	1000 m
Silver medal – second place	2014 Sochi	1500 m
Silver medal – second place	2014 Sochi	5000m
Silver medal – second place	2018 Pyeongchang	3000m
Silver medal – second place	2018 Pyeongchang	Team pursuit
Bronze medal – third place	2006 Turin	1500m
Bronze medal – third place	2022 Beijing	Team pursuit
World Allround Championships
Gold medal – first place	2007 Heerenveen	Allround
Gold medal – first place	2011 Calgary	Allround
Gold medal – first place	2012 Moscow	Allround
Gold medal – first place	2013 Hamar	Allround
Gold medal – first place	2014 Heerenveen	Allround
Gold medal – first place	2017 Hamar	Allround
Gold medal – first place	2020 Hamar	Allround
Silver medal – second place	2008 Berlin	Allround
Silver medal – second place	2015 Calgary	Allround
Silver medal – second place	2016 Berlin	Allround
Silver medal – second place	2018 Amsterdam	Allround
Bronze medal – third place	2009 Hamar	Allround
Bronze medal – third place	2010 Heerenveen	Allround
World Sprint Championships
Silver medal – second place	2007 Hamar	Sprint
World Single Distance Championships
Gold medal – first place	2007 Salt Lake City	1000 m
Gold medal – first place	2007 Salt Lake City	1500 m
Gold medal – first place	2008 Nagano	Team pursuit
Gold medal – first place	2011 Inzell	1500m
Gold medal – first place	2011 Inzell	3000m
Gold medal – first place	2012 Heerenveen	Team pursuit
Gold medal – first place	2013 Sochi	1500m
Gold medal – first place	2013 Sochi	3000m
Gold medal – first place	2013 Sochi	Team pursuit
Gold medal – first place	2016 Kolomna	Team pursuit
Gold medal – first place	2017 Gangneung	3000m
Gold medal – first place	2017 Gangneung	Team pursuit
Gold medal – first place	2019 Inzell	1500 m
Gold medal – first place	2020 Salt Lake City	1500 m
Gold medal – first place	2021 Heerenveen	Team pursuit
Silver medal – second place	2007 Salt Lake City	Team pursuit
Silver medal – second place	2009 Vancouver	1500m
Silver medal – second place	2009 Vancouver	Team pursuit
Silver medal – second place	2011 Inzell	1000m
Silver medal – second place	2011 Inzell	Team pursuit
Silver medal – second place	2012 Heerenveen	1500m
Silver medal – second place	2013 Sochi	1000m
Silver medal – second place	2013 Sochi	5000m
Silver medal – second place	2015 Heerenveen	1500m
Silver medal – second place	2015 Heerenveen	3000m
Silver medal – second place	2015 Heerenveen	Team pursuit
Silver medal – second place	2016 Kolomna	3000m
Silver medal – second place	2017 Gangneung	1500m
Silver medal – second place	2019 Inzell	Team pursuit
Silver medal – second place	2020 Salt Lake City	Team pursuit
Bronze medal – third place	2012 Heerenveen	3000m
European Allround Championships
Gold medal – first place	2008 Kolomna	Allround
Gold medal – first place	2013 Heerenveen	Allround
Gold medal – first place	2014 Hamar	Allround
Gold medal – first place	2015 Chelyabinsk	Allround
Gold medal – first place	2017 Heerenveen	Allround
Silver medal – second place	2007 Collalbo	Allround
Silver medal – second place	2010 Hamar	Allround
Silver medal – second place	2011 Collalbo	Allround
Silver medal – second place	2016 Minsk	Allround
Bronze medal – third place	2006 Hamar	Allround
Bronze medal – third place	2012 Budapest	Allround
European Single Distance Championships
Gold medal – first place	2020 Heerenveen	1500 m
Gold medal – first place	2020 Heerenveen	Team pursuit
Gold medal – first place	2022 Heerenveen	Team pursuit
Silver medal – second place	2020 Heerenveen	Team sprint
Silver medal – second place	2022 Heerenveen	1500 m

Irene Karlijn "Ireen" Wüst (Dutch pronunciation: [iˈreːɱ ˈʋyst]; born 1 April 1986) is a Dutch former long track speed skater. Wüst became the most successful speed skating Olympian ever by achieving at least one gold medal in each of five consecutive Winter Olympic appearances. Wüst is the second athlete (after Britain's Steve Redgrave) to win a gold medal at five consecutive Olympics, Summer or Winter, and the first to do so in individual events.

Wüst is both the youngest Dutch Olympic gold medalist and the oldest speed skating gold medalist in the history of the Winter Games. At the age of nineteen, on 12 February 2006, she won the gold medal at the 2006 Winter Olympic Games 3000 metre event; four years later at the 2010 Winter Olympic Games she won the 1500 metre event; at the 2014 Winter Olympic Games she won two gold and three silver medals, making her the most decorated athlete at the Sochi Games. Following her record sixth speed skating gold medal in the 1500 metres and bronze in the team pursuit event at the 2022 Winter Olympics she has won a record thirteen Olympic medals, more than any other speed skater, making her the most successful athlete of the Netherlands at the Olympics. She is also a seven-time world allround champion, a fifteen-time world single distance champion, and a five-time European allround champion. In 2014, she was elected by Reuters as the Sportswoman of the World.

== Skating career ==
Wüst debuted at the 2004 KNSB Dutch Single Distance Championships in November 2003 with ninth place in both the 500m and 1500m events. At the end of the season, she won the silver medal in the world junior championships in Roseville, Minnesota, USA. The following season she qualified for the 2004–05 World Cup during the 2005 KNSB Dutch Single Distance Championships with fifth place in the 1000m and fourth place in the 1500m. With a third place at the 2005 KNSB Dutch Allround Championships, she qualified for her first international senior tournament, the 2005 European Championships in Heerenveen. There she came fourth and secured a spot in the Dutch team for the 2005 World Allround Championships in Moscow, Russia, where she finished in fifth place. She then became World Junior Champion in Seinäjoki, Finland.

=== Season 2005–2006 ===
Before the start of the season, Wüst signed a deal with TVM and started training under the guidance of Gerard Kemkers. At the 2006 KNSB Dutch Single Distance Championships, which also served as the Olympic Trials, Wüst won the 1000m, 1500m, and 3000m, which gave her a spot in the Dutch Olympic Team for the 2006 Winter Olympics in Turin. Before the Olympics, she started in the 2006 European Championships in Hamar, where she won the bronze medal behind Claudia Pechstein of Germany and teammate Renate Groenewold.

==== Olympic Games in Turin ====
At the 2006 Olympics, her first distance was the 3000 metres where Wüst beat Groenewold and Cindy Klassen of Canada for the gold medal and became The Netherlands' youngest ever Winter Olympics champion. She missed out on the podium in the 1000 metres, finishing fourth. At her last event, the 1500 metres, she won a bronze medal behind Cindy Klassen and Kristina Groves of Canada. At her last event of the season, the 2006 World Allround Championships, Wüst finished fourth after she had been ill a few days before the tournament.

After the end of the season, Wüst was elected as the best Dutch Sportswoman of the Year 2006. She was also elected female skater of the year.

=== Season 2006–2007 ===
Wüst started the season with two titles and one second place at the 2007 Dutch Distance Championships. She also won the 2007 Dutch Allround Championships. At the 2007 European Championships, Wüst led the championships after 3 of 4 distances but was beaten by Martina Sáblíková. The following weekend she competed in the 2007 World Sprint Speed Skating Championships in Hamar, again winning the silver medal. She became World Allround Champion during the 2007 World Allround Championships for the home crowd in Heerenveen. She won the 2006–07 World Cup in the 1500 m after winning two of the six races, as well as the 1000 m during the World Cup Final in Calgary. At the 2007 World Distance Championships, she won a gold medal in the 1000 m, breaking the national record, and another in the 1500 m. With Renate Groenewold and Paulien van Deutekom, she won silver in the team pursuit behind Canada.

=== Season 2007–2008 ===
After a difficult start to the season, Wüst won the European allround title in January 2008. Her main competitor this year was Paulien van Deutekom. Wüst finished second behind van Deutekom during the World Allround Championships in Berlin. In Nagano during the 2008 World Distance Championships, she won the gold medal in the team pursuit alongside Groenewold and Van Deutekom. Wüst won only one world race this season, the 1500m in Hamar.

=== 2010 Olympic Games in Vancouver ===
At the 2010 Winter Olympics she won a gold medal in the 1500 metres.

=== 2014 Olympic Games in Sochi ===
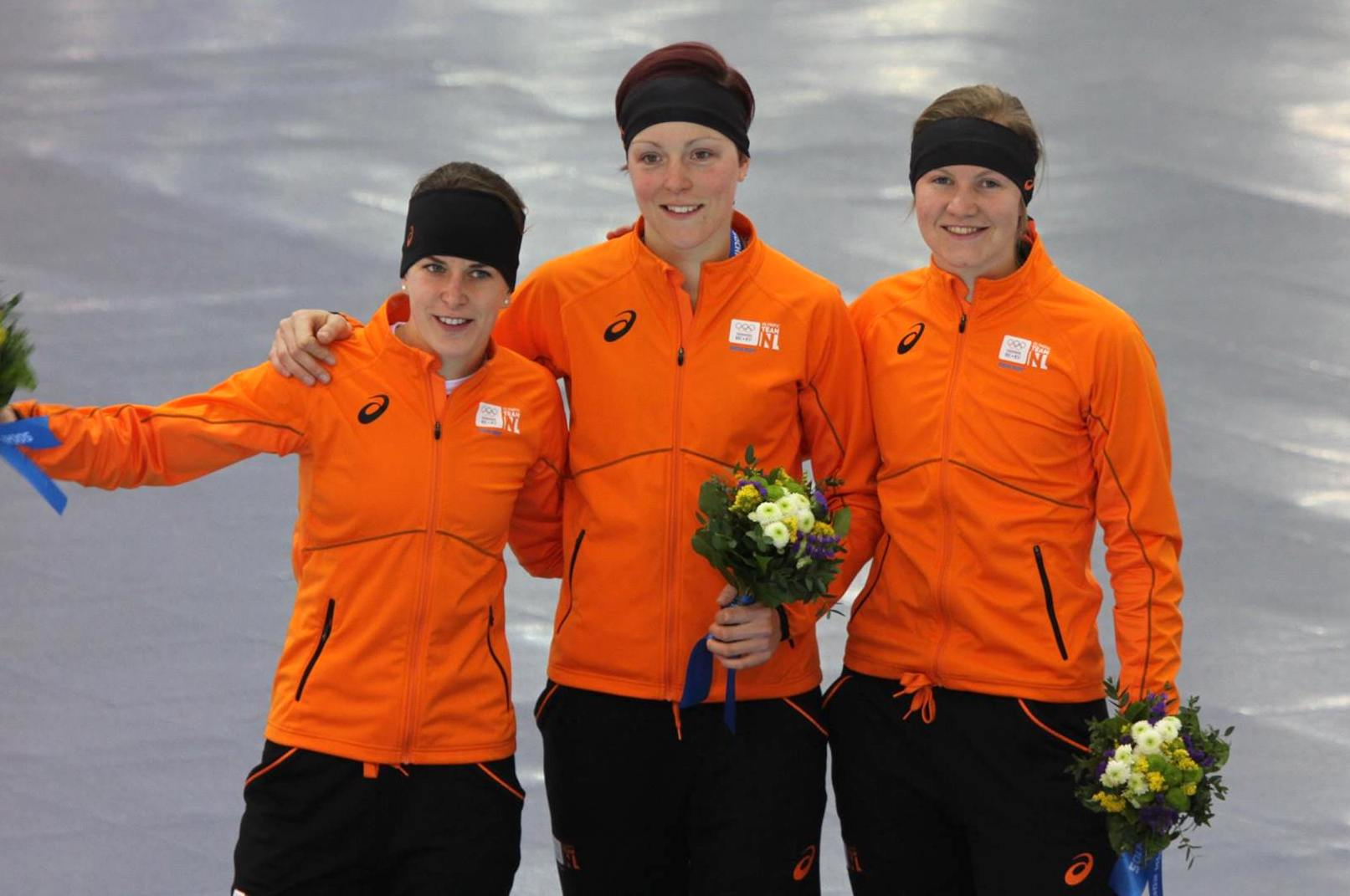
Wüst (left) with teammates Jorien ter Mors (center) and Lotte van Beek (right) at the women's team pursuit podium during the 2014 Olympic Games

At the 2014 Winter Olympics, she won gold medals in the 3000 metres and in the team pursuit, and silver medals in the 1000m, 1500m and 5000m.

=== 2018 Olympic Games in Pyeongchang ===
At the 2018 Winter Olympics, she won a gold medal in the 1500 metres and a silver medal in the 3000 metres. Her 1500 m gold medal was her fourth consecutive medal at this distance at the Olympics, and this was the fourth Olympics in a row in which she won an individual gold medal, the first time this was achieved by a Winter Olympian. She also became the second speed skater to win the Olympic 1500 metres twice (after Lidiya Skoblikova in 1960 and 1964), and the first Dutch athlete to win five gold medals and ten medals overall at the Olympics. She also became the first speed skater, male or female, to win eleven Olympic medals, and the first female Winter Olympian to win nine individual medals.

=== 2022 Olympic Games in Beijing ===
At the 2022 Winter Olympics, she won a gold medal in the 1500 metres, setting a new Olympic record time and becoming the first athlete to earn individual gold medals at five different Olympics (spanning 16 years).

== Personal records ==
Personal records
Speed skating
Event	Result	Date	Location	Notes
500m	38.44	9 February 2007	Heerenveen	
1000m	1:12.64	15 February 2020	Salt Lake City	
1500m	1:50.718	10 March 2019	Salt Lake City	ER
3000m	3:58.01	12 February 2011	Calgary	
5000m	6:54.28	19 February 2014	Sochi	
Team pursuit	2:56.02	17 November 2013	Salt Lake City	ER

She is currently in 5th position on the Adelskalender with a score of 156.436 points.

== Tournament overview ==
Season	Dutch Championships Single Distances	Dutch Championships Sprint	Dutch Championships Allround	European Championships Allround	World Championships Allround	World Championships Sprint	World Championships Single Distances	Olympic Games	World Cup GWC	World Championships Junior Allround	European Championships Single Distances
2003–04	9th 500m 9th 1500m									ROSEVILLE 11th 500m (silver) 1500m (silver) 1000m (silver) 3000m (silver) overall (gold) Team pursuit	
2004–05	5th 1000m 4th 1500m		(silver) 500m 5th 3000m (gold) 1500m 5th 5000m (bronze) overall	HEERENVEEN 7th 500m (silver) 3000m (bronze) 1500m 6th 5000m 4th overall	MOSCOW 5th 500m 4th 3000m (silver) 1500m 6th 5000m 5th overall				28th 1500m	SEINÄJOKI (bronze) 500m (gold) 1500m (gold) 1000m (silver) 3000m (gold) overall (gold) Team pursuit	
2005–06	(gold) 1000m (gold) 1500m (gold) 3000m			HAMAR 5th 500m 4th 3000m (gold) 1500m 4th 5000m (bronze) overall	CALGARY 5th 500m 7th 3000m (silver) 1500m 7th 5000m 4th overall			TURIN 4th 1000m (bronze) 1500m (gold) 3000m 6th Team pursuit	7th 1000m (bronze) 1500m 25th 3/5 km 5th team pursuit		
2006–07	4th 500m (gold) 1000m (gold) 1500m (silver) 3000m		(gold) 500m (silver) 3000m (gold) 1500m (bronze) 5000m (gold) overall	COLLALBO (gold) 500m (bronze) 3000m (gold) 1500m 6th 5000m (silver) overall	HEERENVEEN (silver) 500m (gold) 3000m (gold) 1500m (bronze) 5000m (gold) overall	HAMAR 14th 500m (silver) 1000m 10th 500m (silver) 1000m (silver) overall	SALT LAKE CITY (gold) 1000m (gold) 1500m 5th 3000m (silver) Team pursuit		29th 500m 6th 1000m (gold) 1500m 6th 3/5 km (gold) Team pursuit		
2007–08	8th 500m (bronze) 1000m (silver) 1500m 4th 3000m	5th 500m (gold) 1000m 4th 500m (gold) 1000m (silver) overall	(gold) 500m (silver) 3000m 4th 1500m (silver) 5000m (gold) overall	KOLOMNA 4th 500m (silver) 3000m (gold) 1500m (silver) 5000m (gold) overall	BERLIN (silver) 500m 4th 3000m (gold) 1500m 4th 5000m (silver) overall	HEERENVEEN 19th 500m (silver) 1000m 19th 500m (gold) 1000m 6th overall	NAGANO 9th 1000m 7th 1500m (gold) Team pursuit		42nd 500m (silver) 1000m (bronze) 1500m 7th 3/5 km		
2008–09	10th 500m 6th 1000m (silver) 1500m DQ 3000m	13th 500m 7th 1000m DNS 500m DNQ 1000m NC overall	(gold) 500m (bronze) 3000m (gold) 1500m (gold) 5000m (gold) overall	HEERENVEEN 6th 500m 7th 3000m 4th 1500m 5th 5000m 6th overall	HAMAR (bronze) 500m 7th 3000m (bronze) 1500m 8th 5000m (bronze) overall		VANCOUVER (silver) 1500m (silver) Team pursuit		36th 1000m 6th 1500m (bronze) Team pursuit		
2009–10	6th 500m 5th 1000m (silver) 1500m (gold) 3000m			HAMAR 4th 500m (silver) 3000m (gold) 1500m 5th 5000m (silver) overall	HEERENVEEN 6th 500m (silver) 3000m (silver) 1500m 7th 5000m (bronze) overall			VANCOUVER 8th 1000m (gold) 1500m 7th 3000m 6th Team pursuit	53rd 500m 19th 1000m 6th 1500m 9th 3/5 km 5th Team pursuit		
2010–11	NC 500m 5th 1000m (gold) 1500m (gold) 3000m	5th 500m (gold) 1000m 8th 500m (gold) 1000m 4th overall		COLLALBO 6th 500m (silver) 3000m (gold) 1500m (silver) 5000m (silver) overall	CALGARY (bronze) 500m (silver) 3000m (gold) 1500m (silver) 5000m (gold) overall	HEERENVEEN 13th 500m (silver) 1000m 16th 500m (silver) 1000m 7th overall	INZELL (silver) 1000m (gold) 1500m (gold) 3000m (silver) Team pursuit		5th 1000m (bronze) 1500m 9th 3/5 km (gold) Team pursuit		
2011–12	(bronze) 1000m (gold) 1500m (bronze) 3000m	8th 500m (gold) 1000m 9th 500m (silver) 1000m 5th overall		BUDAPEST (silver) 500m 5th 3000m 6th 1500m (bronze) 5000m (bronze) overall	MOSCOW (bronze) 500m (silver) 3000m (silver) 1500m (silver) 5000m (gold) overall		HEERENVEEN 5th 1000m (silver) 1500m (bronze) 3000m (gold) Team pursuit		5th 1000m (silver) 1500m 8th 3/5 km 6th Team pursuit (bronze) Grand World Cup		
2012–13	6th 1000m (gold) 1500m (silver) 3000m	10th 500m (gold) 1000m 11th 500m (silver) 1000m 5th overall	(gold) 500m (bronze) 3000m (silver) 1500m (bronze) 5000m (silver) overall	HEERENVEEN 4th 500m (gold) 3000m (gold) 1500m (silver) 5000m (gold) overall	HAMAR (silver) 500m (gold) 3000m (gold) 1500m (gold) 5000m (gold) overall		SOCHI (silver) 1000m (gold) 1500m (gold) 3000m (silver) 5000m (gold) Team pursuit		12th 1000m (bronze) 1500m 6th 3/5 km (gold) Team pursuit (gold) Grand World Cup		
2013–14	(silver) 1000m (bronze) 1500m (gold) 3000m	8th 500m (gold) 1000m 7th 500m DQ 1000m NC overall		HAMAR (gold) 500m (gold) 3000m (gold) 1500m (bronze) 5000m (gold) overall	HEERENVEEN (gold) 500m (gold) 3000m (gold) 1500m (silver) 5000m (gold) overall			SOCHI (silver) 1000m (silver) 1500m (gold) 3000m (silver) 5000m (gold) Team pursuit	6th 1000m (gold) 1500m 6th 3/5 km (gold) Team pursuit (silver) Grand World Cup		
2014–15	(silver) 1000m (gold) 1500m (gold) 3000m	13th 500m (silver) 1000m DNS 500m DNS 1000m NC overall	(gold) 500m (gold) 3000m (gold) 1500m (bronze) 5000m (gold) overall	CHELYABINSK (gold) 500m (silver) 3000m (gold) 1500m (silver) 5000m (gold) overall	CALGARY (bronze) 500m (silver) 3000m (bronze) 1500m (bronze) 5000m (silver) overall		HEERENVEEN 4th 1000m (silver) 1500m (silver) 3000m (silver) Team pursuit		6th 1000m 4th 1500m (bronze) 3/5 km (gold) Team pursuit 4th Grand World Cup		
2015–16	(bronze) 1000m (silver) 1500m (gold) 3000m	11th 500m (bronze) 1000m 12th 500m (silver) 1000m 6th overall		MINSK (bronze) 500m (bronze) 3000m (silver) 1500m 4th 5000m (silver) overall	BERLIN 4th 500m (silver) 3000m (gold) 1500m (silver) 5000m (silver) overall		KOLOMNA 6th 1000m 4th 1500m (silver) 3000m (gold) Team pursuit		20th 1500m 17th 3/5 km (silver) Team pursuit		
2016–17	10th 500m (bronze) 1000m (gold) 1500m (gold) 3000m	5th 500m (gold) 1000m 5th 500m (gold) 1000m (gold) overall		HEERENVEEN (gold) 500m (gold) 3000m (gold) 1500m (silver) 5000m (gold) overall	HAMAR (silver) 500m (silver) 3000m (gold) 1500m (silver) 5000m (gold) overall		GANGNEUNG (silver) 1500m (gold) 3000m (gold) Team pursuit		11th 1000m 4th 1500m 9th 3/5 km (silver) Team pursuit		
2017–18	(bronze) 1000m (silver) 1500m (silver) 3000m				AMSTERDAM 9th 500m (gold) 3000m (silver) 1500m (gold) 5000m (silver) overall			GANGNEUNG 9th 1000m (gold) 1500m (silver) 3000m (silver) Team pursuit	16th 1000m 7th 1500m 12th 3/5 km (bronze) Team pursuit		
2018–19	(gold) 1000m (gold) 1500m (silver) 3000m			COLLALBO 4th 500m 7th 3000m 5th 1500m 7th 5000m 4th overall	CALGARY (silver) 500m 6th 3000m (silver) 1500m 7th 5000m 5th overall		INZELL (gold) 1500m 5th 3000m (silver) Team pursuit		53rd 500m 8th 1000m (bronze) 1500m 24th 3/5 km 4th Team pursuit (silver) Team sprint		
2019–20	(bronze) 1000m (silver) 1500m 5th 3000m				HAMAR 4th 500m (bronze) 3000m (gold) 1500m (silver) 5000m (gold) overall		SALT LAKE CITY 4th 1000m (gold) 1500m (silver) Team pursuit		14th 1000m (gold) 1500m		HEERENVEEN 5th 1000m (gold) 1500m (gold) Team pursuit (silver) Team sprint
2020–21	(bronze) 1000m 4th 1500m 5th 3000m	12th 500m 4th 1000m 10th 500m (bronze) 1000m 6th overall					HEERENVEEN 5th 1500m (gold) Team pursuit		5th 1000m (bronze) 1500m (silver) Team pursuit		
2021–22	(bronze) 1000m (silver) 1500m 5th 3000m	7th 500m (gold) 1000m 8th 500m DQ 1000m NC overall						BEIJING 6th 1000m (gold) 1500m (bronze) Team pursuit	19th 1000m 6th 1500m (bronze) Team Pursuit		HEERENVEEN (silver) 1500 m (gold) Team pursuit

== World Cup overview ==
Season	500 meter											
2004–2005												
2005–2006												
2006–2007	8th	–	14th	–	–	–	–	–	–	–	–	–
2007–2008	–	–	–	–	–	–	–	–	1st(b)			
2008–2009												
2009–2010												
2010–2011												
2011–2012												
2012–2013												
2013–2014												
2014–2015												
2015–2016												
2016–2017												
2017–2018												
2018–2019												
2019–2020												
2020–2021												
2021–2022												

Season	1000 meter									
2004–2005										
2005–2006	6th	–	–	–	–	1st place, gold medalist(s)				
2006–2007	3rd place, bronze medalist(s)	3rd place, bronze medalist(s)	2nd place, silver medalist(s)	–	–	–	–	–	–	1st place, gold medalist(s)
2007–2008	7th	8th	12th	6th	4th	2nd place, silver medalist(s)	3rd place, bronze medalist(s)	2nd place, silver medalist(s)	2nd place, silver medalist(s)	4th
2008–2009	16th	13th	–	–	–	–	–	–	–	–
2009–2010	1st(b)	5th	16th	–	–	–	16th			
2010–2011	3rd place, bronze medalist(s)	5th	–	–	–	–	2nd place, silver medalist(s)	1st place, gold medalist(s)		
2011–2012	11th	5th	7th	3rd place, bronze medalist(s)	5th	2nd place, silver medalist(s)	–			
2012–2013	–	–	–	–	–	5th	2nd place, silver medalist(s)	2nd place, silver medalist(s)	–	
2013–2014	7th	3rd place, bronze medalist(s)	–	–	–	1st place, gold medalist(s)				
2014–2015	2nd place, silver medalist(s)	6th	–	4th	5th	–	–			
2015–2016										
2016–2017	5th	6th	–	5th	–	–	–			
2017–2018	11th	14th	–	–	4th	–				
2018–2019	5th	4th	4th	8th	–	6th				
2019–2020	7th	5th	–	10th	–					
2020–2021	5th	6th								
2021–2022	6th	9th	9th	–						

Season	1500 meter						
2004–2005	–	–	–	1st(b)	–		
2005–2006	6th	7th	4th	–	1st place, gold medalist(s)		
2006–2007	3rd place, bronze medalist(s)	2nd place, silver medalist(s)	–	1st place, gold medalist(s)	2nd place, silver medalist(s)	1st place, gold medalist(s)	
2007–2008	5th	13th	–	5th	1st place, gold medalist(s)	–	2nd place, silver medalist(s)
2008–2009	8th	7th	–	3rd place, bronze medalist(s)	4th	11th	
2009–2010	11th	1st place, gold medalist(s)	2nd place, silver medalist(s)	12th	9th	–	
2010–2011	2nd place, silver medalist(s)	3rd place, bronze medalist(s)	–	2nd place, silver medalist(s)	2nd place, silver medalist(s)	1st place, gold medalist(s)	
2011–2012	1st place, gold medalist(s)	3rd place, bronze medalist(s)	2nd place, silver medalist(s)	1st place, gold medalist(s)	1st place, gold medalist(s)	–	
2012–2013	–*	–	–	1st place, gold medalist(s)	1st place, gold medalist(s)	1st place, gold medalist(s)	
2013–2014	2nd place, silver medalist(s)	1st place, gold medalist(s)	–	1st place, gold medalist(s)	1st place, gold medalist(s)	1st place, gold medalist(s)	
2014–2015	1st place, gold medalist(s)	2nd place, silver medalist(s)	1st place, gold medalist(s)	4th	–	–	
2015–2016	–	–	–	–	4th	–	
2016–2017	3rd place, bronze medalist(s)	2nd place, silver medalist(s)	–	1st place, gold medalist(s)	–	–	
2017–2018	4th	–	4th	–	1st place, gold medalist(s)	–	
2018–2019	4th	1st place, gold medalist(s)	2nd place, silver medalist(s)	1st place, gold medalist(s)	–	4th	
2019–2020	1st place, gold medalist(s)	1st place, gold medalist(s)	2nd place, silver medalist(s)	3rd place, bronze medalist(s)	1st place, gold medalist(s)		
2020–2021	2nd place, silver medalist(s)	3rd place, bronze medalist(s)					
2021–2022	4th	2nd place, silver medalist(s)	4th	-			

Season	3000/5000 meter						
2004–2005							
2005–2006	–	–	–*	1st(b)	–		
2006–2007	2nd place, silver medalist(s)	3rd place, bronze medalist(s)	–	2nd place, silver medalist(s)	–*	–	
2007–2008	9th	7th	–*	3rd place, bronze medalist(s)	–*	–	2nd place, silver medalist(s)
2008–2009							
2009–2010	11th	6th	–*	6th	4th	–	
2010–2011	4th	8th	–*	2nd place, silver medalist(s)	–*	–	
2011–2012	2nd place, silver medalist(s)	4th	–*	3rd place, bronze medalist(s)	–*	–	
2012–2013	8th	–	–	1st place, gold medalist(s)	–*	1st place, gold medalist(s)	
2013–2014	3rd place, bronze medalist(s)	–	–*	3rd place, bronze medalist(s)	1st place, gold medalist(s)	–	
2014–2015	1st place, gold medalist(s)	–*	1st place, gold medalist(s)	2nd place, silver medalist(s)	3rd place, bronze medalist(s)	–	
2015–2016	–	–*	–	–	2nd place, silver medalist(s)	–	
2016–2017	7th	5th	–	–*	1st place, gold medalist(s)	–	
2017–2018	6th	–	3rd place, bronze medalist(s)	–	–		
2018–2019	6th	6th	–*				
2019–2020							
2020–2021							
2021–2022							

Season	Team pursuit			
2004–2005				
2005–2006	–	1st place, gold medalist(s)	–	
2006–2007	1st place, gold medalist(s)	–	3rd place, bronze medalist(s)	
2007–2008	–	–	–	–
2008–2009	1st place, gold medalist(s)	1st place, gold medalist(s)	–	
2009–2010	2nd place, silver medalist(s)	–	4th	–
2010–2011	2nd place, silver medalist(s)	–	1st place, gold medalist(s)	
2011–2012	2nd place, silver medalist(s)	DNF	–	–
2012–2013	–	–	1st place, gold medalist(s)	1st place, gold medalist(s)
2013–2014	1st place, gold medalist(s)	1st place, gold medalist(s)	1st place, gold medalist(s)	–
2014–2015	1st place, gold medalist(s)	1st place, gold medalist(s)	–	
2015–2016				
2016–2017	1st place, gold medalist(s)	–	–	2nd place, silver medalist(s)
2017–2018	2nd place, silver medalist(s)	–	–	–
2018–2019	2nd place, silver medalist(s)	–	4th	
2019–2020	2nd place, silver medalist(s)	2nd place, silver medalist(s)	–	
2020–2021	2nd place, silver medalist(s)	2nd place, silver medalist(s)		
2021–2022	3rd place, bronze medalist(s)	2nd place, silver medalist(s)	-	

– = Did not participate
* = 5000m
(b) = Division B
DNF = Did not finish
DQ = Disqualified
NC = No classification
DNQ =Did not qualify

=== Medals won ===
updated December 2021

Championship	Gold (gold)	Silver (silver)	Bronze (bronze)
Dutch Single Distances	18	12	9
Dutch Allround	15	6	6
Dutch Sprint	10	5	2
European Allround	21	16	8
Olympic Games	6	5	2
World Single Distances	15	15	1
World Allround	22	26	11
World Sprint Classification	1	6	0
World Cup	48	41	22
World Cup GWC	9	7	10
World Junior	4	5	1

== Personal life ==
On 1 March 2006, Wüst was awarded as Knight of the Order of the Netherlands Lion for services to sport, i.e., winning the women's 3000 m speed skating competition at the 2006 Winter Olympics in Turin. On 22 February 2022, she was further appointed a Commander of the Order of Orange-Nassau for her outstanding performance in sport in general over the years and winning the women's 1500 m speed skating competition at the 2022 Winter Olympics in Beijing.

Wüst is bisexual and first discussed being in a relationship with a woman in a 2009 Dutch interview.

The umlaut "ü" in her family name, which is normally not used in Dutch, stems from a German ancestor who settled as a merchant in the Friesian town of Dokkum at the end of the 18th century.

== See also ==
- List of multiple Olympic gold medalists
- List of multiple Winter Olympic medalists
