= 2020 European Speed Skating Championships – Women's team pursuit =

Women's team pursuit at the 2020 European Speed Skating Championships
- Venue: Thialf
- Location: Heerenveen, Netherlands
- Dates: 12 January
- Competitors: 15 from 5 nations
- Teams: 5
- Winning time: 2:57.97

Medalists
gold medal	Antoinette de Jong; Melissa Wijfje; Ireen Wüst	Netherlands
silver medal	Elizaveta Kazelina; Evgeniia Lalenkova; Natalia Voronina	Russia
bronze medal	Tatsiana Mikhailava; Yeugeniya Vorobyova; Maryna Zuyeva	Belarus

The women's team pursuit competition at the 2020 European Speed Skating Championships was held on 12 January 2020.

== Results ==
The race was started at 14:15.

Rank	Pair	Lane	Country	Time	Diff
1st place, gold medalist(s)	2	c	Netherlands; Antoinette de Jong; Melissa Wijfje; Ireen Wüst	2:57.97	
2nd place, silver medalist(s)	2	s	Russia; Elizaveta Kazelina; Evgeniia Lalenkova; Natalia Voronina	2:59.04	+1.07
3rd place, bronze medalist(s)	3	s	Belarus; Tatsiana Mikhailava; Yeugeniya Vorobyova; Maryna Zuyeva	3:05.47	+7.50
4	3	c	Poland; Karolina Bosiek; Natalia Czerwonka; Karolina Gąsecka	3:05.62	+7.65
5	1	s	Belgium; Sandrine Tas; Stien Vanhoutte; Anke Vos	3:17.99	+20.02
