= 2022 European Speed Skating Championships – Women's team pursuit =

Women's team pursuit at the 2022 European Speed Skating Championships
- Venue: Thialf
- Location: Heerenveen, Netherlands
- Dates: 9 January
- Competitors: 18 from 6 nations
- Teams: 6
- Winning time: 2:54.12

Medalists
gold medal	Ireen Wüst; Antoinette de Jong; Irene Schouten	Netherlands
silver medal	Marit Fjellanger Bøhm; Ragne Wiklund; Sofie Karoline Haugen	Norway
bronze medal	Elizaveta Golubeva; Natalya Voronina; Evgeniia Lalenkova	Russia

The women's team pursuit competition at the 2022 European Speed Skating Championships was held on 9 January 2022.

== Results ==
The race was started at 14:00.

Rank	Pair	Lane	Country	Time	Diff
1st place, gold medalist(s)	3	c	Netherlands; Ireen Wüst; Antoinette de Jong; Irene Schouten	2:54.12 TR	
2nd place, silver medalist(s)	2	s	Norway; Marit Fjellanger Bøhm; Ragne Wiklund; Sofie Karoline Haugen	2:58.54	+4.42
3rd place, bronze medalist(s)	3	s	Russia; Elizaveta Golubeva; Natalya Voronina; Evgeniia Lalenkova	2:59.32	+5.19
4	1	s	Belarus; Yauheniya Varabyova; Ekaterina Sloeva; Maryna Zuyeva	3:03.14	+9.02
5	1	c	Germany; Michelle Uhrig; Leia Behlau; Lea Sophie Scholz	3:08.31	+14.19
6	2	c	Poland; Kaja Ziomek; Karolina Bosiek; Magdalena Czyszczoń	3:09.55	+15.43
