= Kelly Gunther =

American speed skater (born 1987)

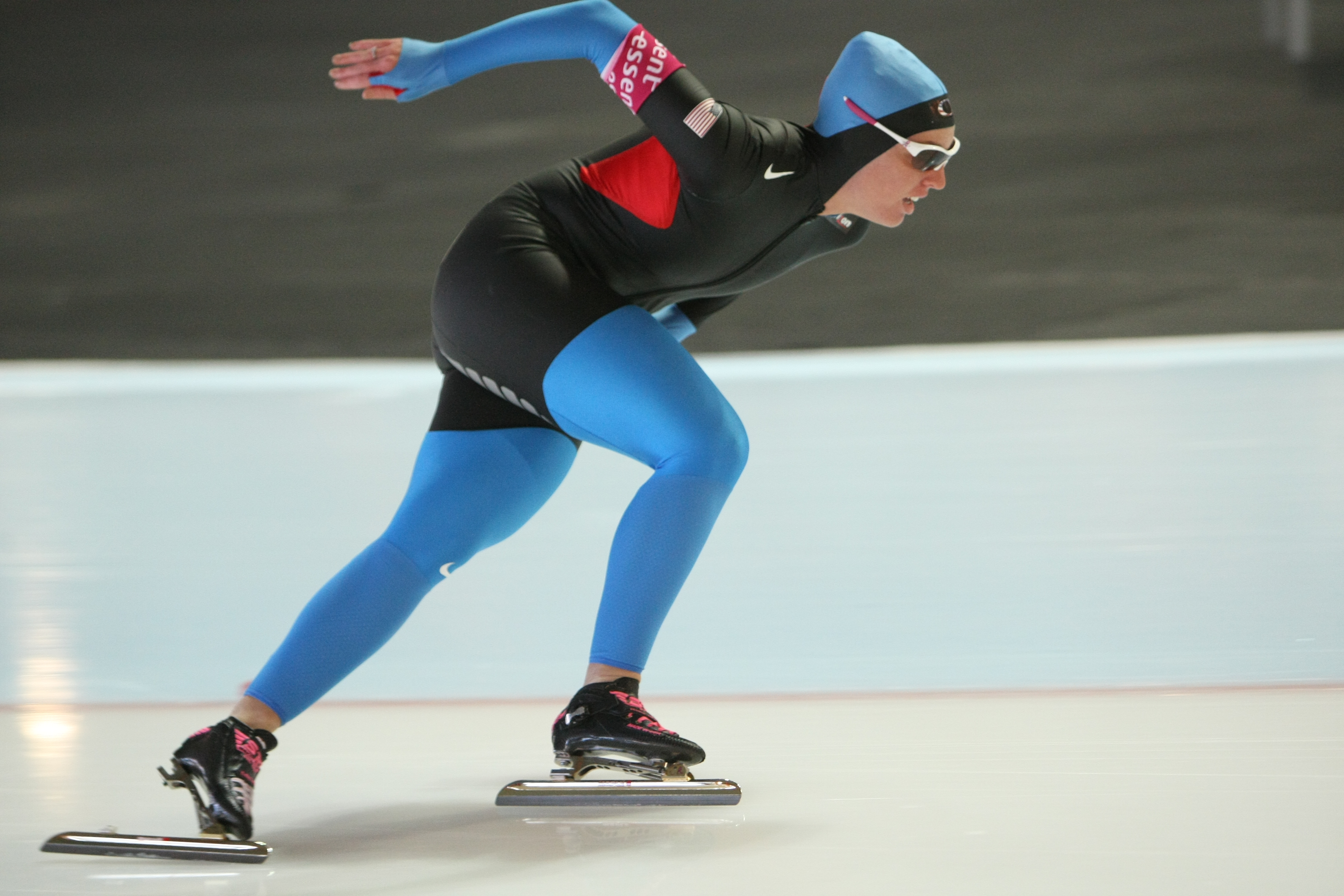
- Kelly Gunther skating during a March 2010 event

Personal information
- Born: August 14, 1987 (age 38) Lorain, Ohio

Sport
- Country: United States
- Sport: Speed skating
- Coached by: Ryan Shimabukuro

Kelly Gunther (born August 14, 1987) is an American speed skater who participated in the 2014 Winter Olympics. She began roller skating at age six, briefly tried figure skating, then took up inline speed skating. As an inline skater, she won multiple World Championship gold medals on the United States relay team. In 2009, she transitioned to ice speed skating.

At the 2010 Olympic trials, Gunther appeared to make the United States speed skating team, but was bumped from the team after another skater was granted a re-skate. In March 2010, she fell during a race and suffered a double-compound fracture that nearly severed her foot from her leg. After intensive rehab, Gunther was able to return to skating and set two personal best times in November 2011. She made the 2011–2012 World Cup team and placed third in the 1000 meters at the 2011–2012 national championships. At the 2014 U.S. Olympic trials, she skated a personal best time of 1:16.43 in the 1000 meters to place fourth and make the Olympic team.

== Early life ==
Kelly Gunther was born August 14, 1987, to mother Julie Sprague in Lorain, Ohio. She began roller skating at age six after "[falling] in love with it" at Lorain Skate World. She tried figure skating, but found she wanted to skate faster than the music allowed, prompting her to take up inline skating.

When she was 11, Gunther's father walked out on the family, prompting Sprague to move Gunther to Macomb County, Michigan, and take on two jobs. During the day she worked as a caseworker and at night she ran a company that cleaned up apartments after people moved. After inline skating practice, Gunther would help her mother clean. "It was fun," Gunther recalled. "As fun as cleaning can be."

Gunther attended Washington Elementary and Whittier Middle schools in Lorain before moving to Michigan. As a child, she had a learning disability and was placed in special classes. She graduated from Chippewa Valley High School in 2006.

== Skating career ==
During her ten years as an inline skater, Gunther made the United States' Junior World Championship team several times and won multiple gold medals as part of American relay teams. In 2009, she switched from inline skating to ice speed skating and moved to Utah to join the national team. To support herself, she worked part-time at General Electric.

At the 2010 Olympic trials, Gunther appeared to win the 1000 meter race and with it the final Olympic spot in the event. (Three women were selected by a panel before the trials.) However, another skater – Rebekah Bradford – was granted a re-skate after falling in her heat. Bradford ended up bettering Gunther's time and taking the Olympic spot. "It was a major setback, more emotionally than anything else," Gunther recalled. "It was heartbreaking."

A few months later, in March 2010, Gunther slipped during a 500-meter race at the Utah Olympic Oval. She crashed into the pads, causing a double-compound fracture in her ankle that nearly severed her foot from her leg. "2010 was definitely not one of my better years on the ice," she later reflected. "But it was the year that helped shape who I am". Most people who saw the injury felt Gunther would never skate again, let alone compete at a high level.

After surgery to repair her ankle, Gunther moved to Colorado Springs to be near the USOC Training Center's rehabilitation facility. She spent four months in a cast. Six months after the accident, she was skating again, but was not able to seriously train. Even so, Gunther decided to race again in December 2010. By coincidence, her first race was a 500-meter race at the Utah Olympic Oval, in the same lane as her accident. "I actually had tears in my eyes when I approached the starting line", she recalled. After a year, the screws in her ankle were removed and she could start training again. Gunther returned to professional-level competition on the American Cup circuit, winning the 1000 meters. At the U.S. Single Distance Championships in November 2011, she set personal bests in the 500 meter and 1500 meter races. She made the 2011–2012 World Cup Team and took third place in the 1000 meters at the national championships.

At the 2014 Olympic trials, Gunther skated a personal best of 1:16.43 in the 1000 meters on the same track as her accident. Her time placed her fourth, and earned her an Olympic berth. "I'm a really big believer that everything happens for a reason," she said. "There's a reason I fell at this rink, so making this 2014 team is just icing on the cake with everything I've been through." Earlier at the trials, she finished seventh in the 500 meters. She concluded the trials with a seventh-place finish in the 1500 meters.

Gunther is coached by Ryan Shimabukuro. Previously, she was coached by inline coach Robb Dunn.

== Personal life ==
Gunther's father died in November 2012. Although it had been years since he was in contact with the family, Gunther attended his funeral. "My dad was an alcoholic," she commented. "I forgave him." As of 2014, Gunther lives in West Jordan, Utah. She is taking classes at Salt Lake Community College in pursuit of a degree in early childhood education. In her free time she likes to go shopping, hang out with friends, and vacation in St. Thomas. Gunther lists her mother as the greatest influence in her life. Kelly has a brother, Brad Sprague that still resides in Lorain, Ohio.

== Personal records ==
Personal records
Women's speed skating
| Event | Result | Date | Location | Notes |
| 500 m | 39.14 | November 5, 2011 | Utah Olympic Oval, Salt Lake City | |
| 1000 m | 1:16.43 | December 29, 2013 | Utah Olympic Oval, Salt Lake City | |
| 1500 m | 1:58.65 | October 27, 2013 | Utah Olympic Oval, Salt Lake City | |
| 3000 m | 4:16.27 | November 2, 2012 | Pettit National Ice Center, Milwaukee | |
| 5000 m | 7:43.77 | December 31, 2012 | Utah Olympic Oval, Salt Lake City | |
