= Li Dan (speed skater, born 1994) =

Chinese speed skater, born 1994

Personal information
- Nationality: Chinese
- Born: 6 May 1994 (age 31)

Sport
- Sport: Speed skating

Li Dan (born 6 May 1994) is a Chinese speed skater. She competed in the 2018 Winter Olympics.
