= Evgeniia Lalenkova =

Russian speed skater

Evgenia Lalenkova
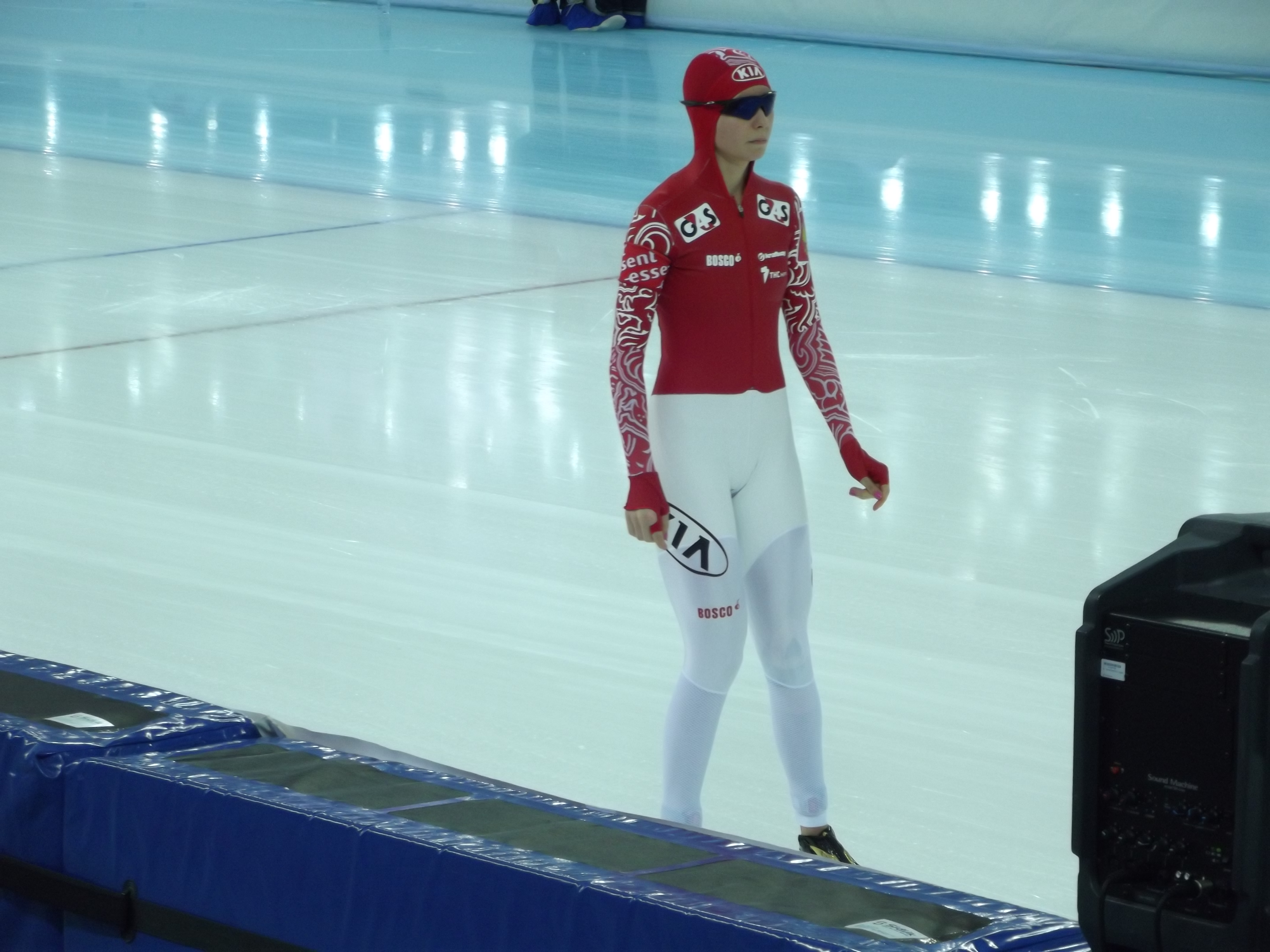
- Lalenkova in 2013

Personal information
- Nationality: Russian
- Born: 8 September 1990 (age 35) Furmanov, Russia
- Height: 1.71 m (5 ft 7 in)
- Weight: 57 kg (126 lb)

Sport
- Country: Russia
- Sport: Speed skating
- Event: 1500 m
- Club: Cherepovets Youth Sports School
Medal record
Women's speed skating
Representing Russia
World Single Distances Championships
Silver medal – second place	2020 Salt Lake City	1500 m
Bronze medal – third place	2019 Inzell	Team pursuit
European Championships
Silver medal – second place	2020 Heerenveen	1500 m
Silver medal – second place	2020 Heerenveen	Team pursuit
Bronze medal – third place	2022 Heerenveen	Team pursuit
Representing Russian Skating Union
World Single Distances Championships
Bronze medal – third place	2021 Heerenveen	1500 m
Bronze medal – third place	2021 Heerenveen	Team pursuit

Evgenia Mikhailovna Lalenkova (Russian: Евгения Михайловна Лаленкова, née Dmitrieva; born 8 September 1990) is a Russian speed skater.

She participated at the 2019 World Single Distances Speed Skating Championships, winning the bronze medal in the team pursuit.

She is married to speed skater Yevgeny Lalenkov.

== World Cup results ==
=== Podiums ===
Date	Season	Location	Rank	Event
23 November 2019	2019–20	Tomaszów Mazowiecki	1st place, gold medalist(s)	Team pursuit
24 November 2019	2019–20	Tomaszów Mazowiecki	3rd place, bronze medalist(s)	1500 m
8 December 2019	2019–20	Nur-Sultan	3rd place, bronze medalist(s)	Team pursuit
15 December 2019	2019–20	Nagano	3rd place, bronze medalist(s)	Team pursuit
