= Hao Jiachen =

Chinese speed skater

Personal information
- Born: 7 May 1990 (age 35) Shuangyashan, Heilongjiang, China
- Height: 167 cm (5 ft 6 in)
- Weight: 56 kg (123 lb)

Sport
- Country: China
- Sport: Speed skating

Hao Jiachen (Chinese: 郝佳晨; pinyin: Hǎo Jiāchén; Mandarin pronunciation: [xàʊ tɕjá ʈʂʰə̌n]; born 7 May 1990) is a Chinese speed skater. She competed in the women's 3000 metres at the 2018 Winter Olympics.
