= Sofie Karoline Haugen =

Norwegian speed skater

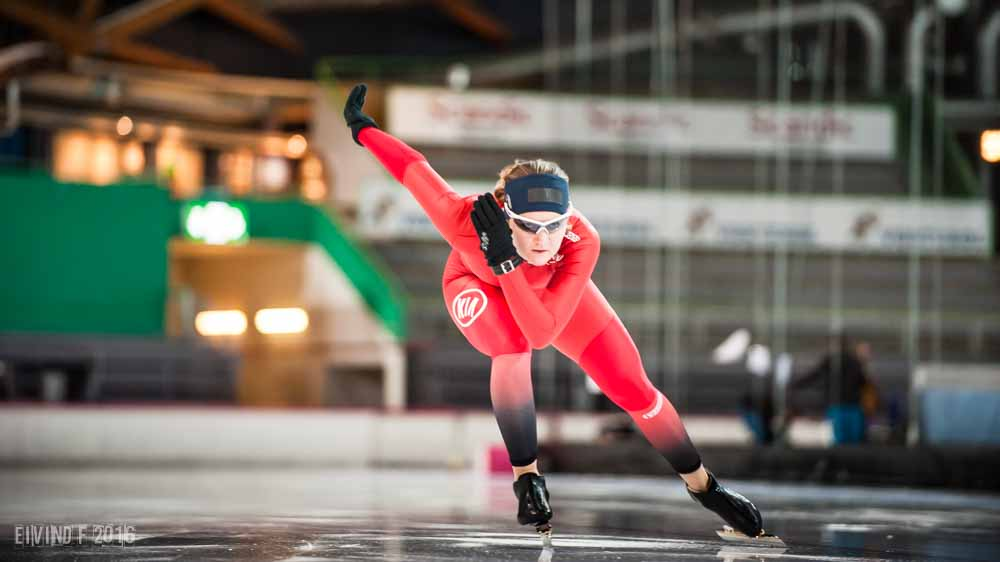
- Haugen, 2016

Personal information
- Born: 22 April 1995 (age 31) Tønsberg, Norway
- Height: 169 cm (5 ft 7 in)

Sport
- Country: Norway
- Sport: Speed skating
- Club: Sandefjord SK
Medal record
European Championships
Silver medal – second place	2022 Heerenveen	Team pursuit
Bronze medal – third place	2018 Kolomna	Team sprint

Sofie Karoline Haugen (born 22 April 1995) is a Norwegian speed skater. She won a bronze medal in team sprint at the 2018 European Speed Skating Championships in Kolomna, Russia, along with Martine Ripsrud and Anne Gulbrandsen. Haugen participated in the World Allround Speed Skating Championships in 2016, 2017 and 2018.

Taking up long-distance running in 2026, she won the bronze medal in 5000 metres and the silver medal in 10,000 metres at the 2026 Norwegian Championships. Haugen proceeded to make her marathon race debut at the 2026 Malaga Marathon, finishing in 2:27.12 hours as the fourth fastest Norwegian of all time, behind Ingrid Kristiansen, Grete Waitz and Stine Larsen.
