= Zhao Xin (speed skater, born 1992) =

Chinese speed skater

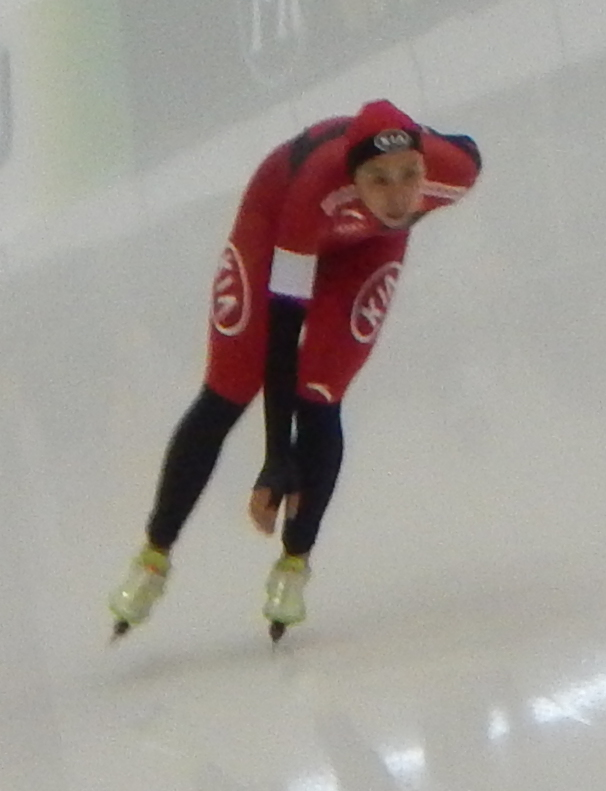

Personal information
- Born: December 31, 1992 (age 33) Jilin, China
- Height: 5 ft 9 in (175 cm)
- Weight: 154 lb (70 kg)

Sport
- Country: China
- Sport: Speed skating

Achievements and titles
- Highest world ranking: 28 (mass start)

Zhao Xin (Chinese: 趙欣, born 31 December 1992) is a Chinese speed-skater.

Zhao competed at the 2014 Winter Olympics for China. In the 1500 metres she placed 34th.

As of September 2014, Zhao's best performance at the World Allround Speed Skating Championships is 13th, in 2014.

Zhao made her World Cup debut in November 2012. As of September 2014, Zhao's top World Cup finish is 12th in a mass start race at Kolomna in 2012–13. Her best overall finish in the World Cup is 28th, in the 2012–13 mass start.
