= Roxanne Dufter =

German speed skater

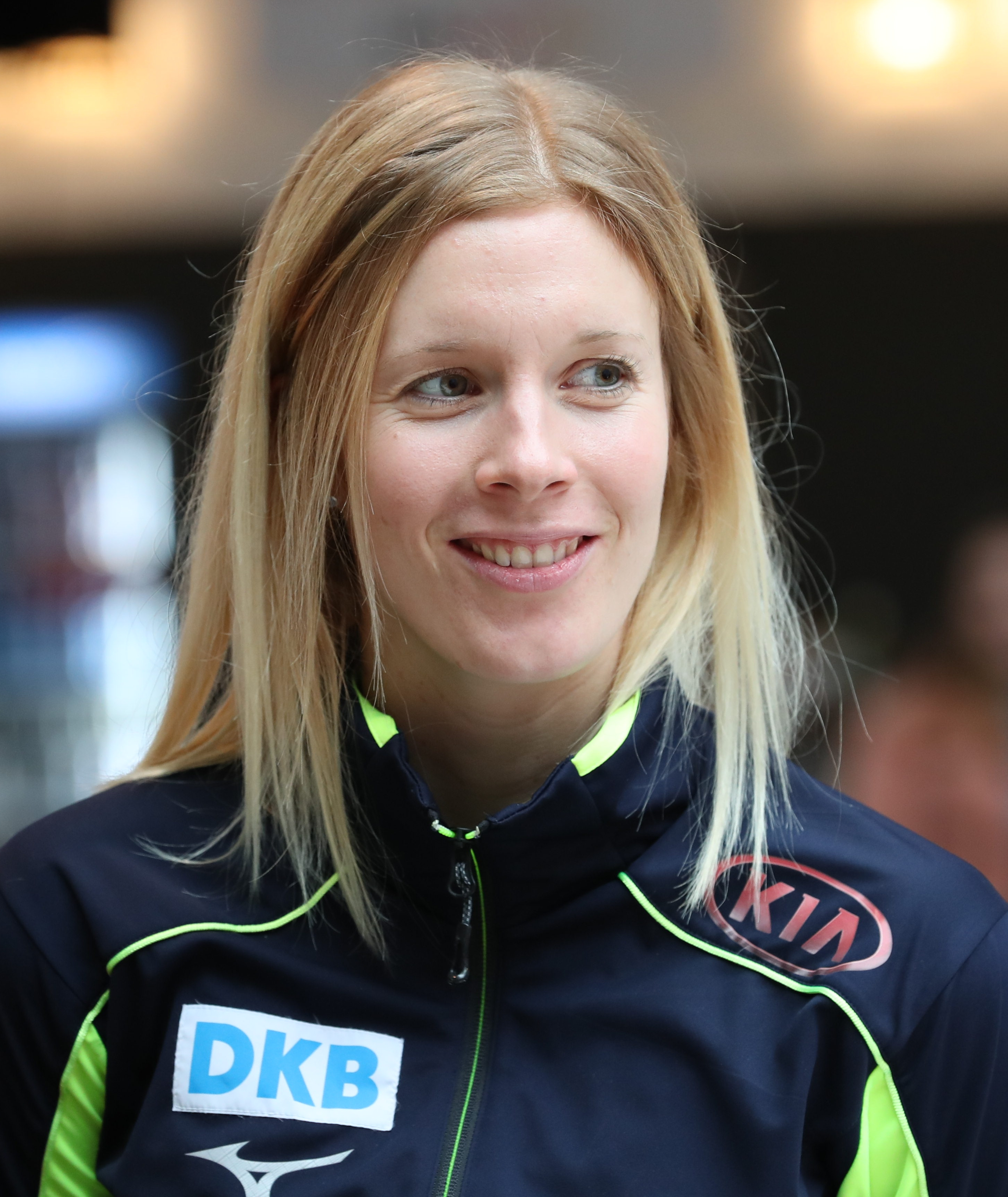
- Dufter in 2018

Personal information
- Born: 13 February 1992 (age 33) Kempten, Germany
- Height: 185 cm (6 ft 1 in)
- Weight: 74 kg (163 lb)

Sport
- Country: Germany
- Sport: Speed skating

Roxanne Dufter (born 13 February 1992) is a German speed skater. She competed in the women's 3000 metres at the 2018 Winter Olympics.
