= Ida Njåtun =

Norwegian speed skater (born 1991)

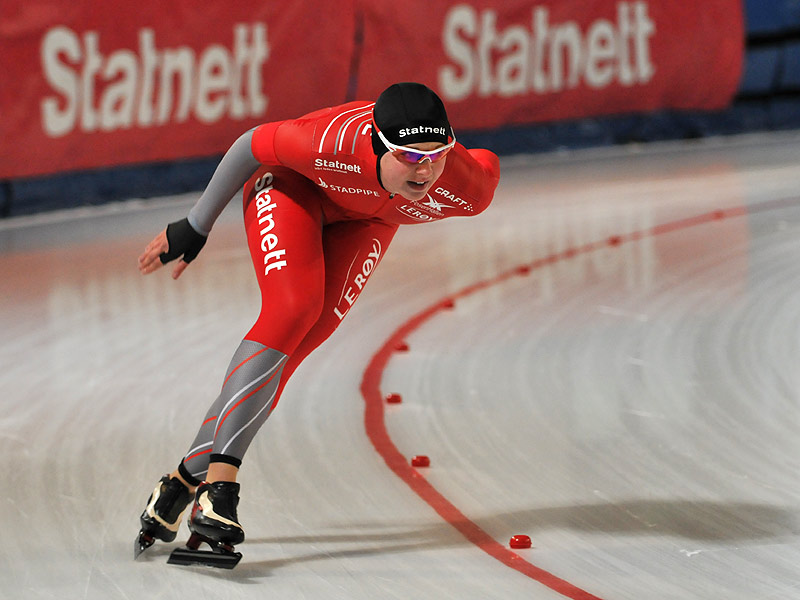
- Njåtun in 2011

Personal information
- Nationality: Norwegian
- Born: 6 February 1991 (age 35) Bærum, Norway
- Height: 1.79 m (5 ft 10 in) (2014)

Sport
- Country: Norway
- Sport: Speed skating
Medal record
World Allround Championships
Bronze medal – third place	2015 Calgary	Allround
- Updated on 8 March 2015

Ida Njåtun (Norwegian: [ˈîːdɑ ˈnjôːtʉːn]; born 6 February 1991) is a Norwegian speed skater specialising in the 1500 and 3000 metres distances. She represents the club Asker SK.

Njåtun won her first medal at a Norwegian senior championship in 2008 (then aged 16), and became Norwegian allround champion in 2011. Njåtun withdrew from defending her national title the following season due to illness, but came back to win four successive gold medals in the allround championships from 2013 to 2016, and again in 2019. Njåtun has been on the podium in the World Cup twice, in Berlin 2010 and in Erfurt in 2018 (both in the 1500 metre event).

During the 2014-15 World Cup season, she came sixth in the 1500 metres overall ranking (with four individual fourth places, including at the World Cup Final in Erfurt). Despite coming in seventh place at the 2015 World Single Distance Championships, she came back to win the bronze medal at the 2015 World Allround Championships. Njåtun's medal was the first by a Norwegian female skater at the World Allround Championships since Bjørg Eva Jensen in 1980. During the competition, Njåtun also won the 1500 metres event and set a new national distance record of 1:52.71.

Njåtun came fifth in the 2015-16 World Cup 1500 metres rankings, but only finished in tenth place at the 2016 World Single Distance Championships. She also failed to qualify for the final distance at the 2016 World Allround Championships, finishing as number nine.

== Personal records ==
Personal records
Women's speed skating
Event	Result	Date	Location	Notes
500 m	39.38	7 March 2015	Olympic Oval, Calgary	
1000 m	1:15.68	14 November 2015	Olympic Oval, Calgary	
1500 m	1:54.51	8 March 2015	Olympic Oval, Calgary	
3000 m	3:57.58	15 November 2013	Utah Olympic Oval, Salt Lake City	
5000 m	6:56.45	8 March 2015	Olympic Oval, Calgary	

She is currently in 16th position in the adelskalender.
