= 2011 KNSB Dutch Single Distance Championships – Women's 1500 m =

- Venue: Thialf, Heerenveen, Netherlands
- Date: 7 November 2010
- Competitors: 22 skaters

Medalist men
1st place, gold medalist(s)		Ireen Wüst	NED
2nd place, silver medalist(s)		Marrit Leenstra	NED
3rd place, bronze medalist(s)		Laurine van Riessen	NED

The women's 1500 meter at the 2011 KNSB Dutch Single Distance Championships took place in Heerenveen at the Thialf ice skating rink on Sunday 7 November 2010. Although this tournament was held in 2010, it was part of the 2010–2011 speed skating season.

There were 22 participants.

Title holder was Annette Gerritsen.

There was a qualification selection incentive for the next following 2010–11 ISU Speed Skating World Cup tournaments.

== Overview ==
=== Result ===
Rank	Skater	Time
1st place, gold medalist(s)	Ireen Wüst	1:57.33
2nd place, silver medalist(s)	Marrit Leenstra	1:57.39
3rd place, bronze medalist(s)	Laurine van Riessen	1:59.58
4	Ingeborg Kroon	1:59.68
5	Jorien Voorhuis	1:59.69
6	Lotte van Beek	1:59.81
7	Margot Boer	1:59.97
8	Linda de Vries	2:00.03 PR
9	Diane Valkenburg	2:00.43
10	Roxanne van Hemert	2:00.49
11	Marije Joling	2:00.58 PR
12	Anice Das	2:01.86
13	Yvonne Nauta	2:01.88
14	Pien Keulstra	2:01.99 PR
15	Marit Dekker	2:02.31 PR
16	Janine Smit	2:02.45
17	Rixt Meijer	2:02.74 PR
18	Natasja Bruintjes	2:03.11
19	Bo van der Werff	2:04.14 PR
20	Carlijn Achtereekte	2:04.26 PR
21	Elma de Vries	2:07.96
–	Irene Schouten	WDR

WDR = Withdrew

=== Draw ===
Heat	Inner lane	Outer lane
1	Pien Keulstra	Bo van der Werff
2	Rixt Meijer	Irene Schouten
3	Marit Dekker	Carlijn Achtereekte
4	Janine Smit	Linda de Vries
5	Roxanne van Hemert	Anice Das
6	Marrit Leenstra	Yvonne Nauta
7	Ingeborg Kroon	Marije Joling
8	Diane Valkenburg	Margot Boer
9	Ireen Wüst	Elma de Vries
10	Jorien Voorhuis	Laurine van Riessen
11	Lotte van Beek	Natasja Bruintjes
