= 2014 KNSB Dutch Sprint Championships =

Dutch speed skating competition

KNSB Dutch Sprint Championships
- Venue: Olympic Stadium, Amsterdam
- Dates: 28 February – 1 March 2014
- Competitors: 22 men 20 women

Medalist men
1st place, gold medalist(s)		Michel Mulder	NED
2nd place, silver medalist(s)		Hein Otterspeer	NED
3rd place, bronze medalist(s)		Kjeld Nuis	NED

Medalist women
1st place, gold medalist(s)		Margot Boer	NED
2nd place, silver medalist(s)		Lotte van Beek	NED
3rd place, bronze medalist(s)		Thijsje Oenema	NED

The 2014 KNSB Dutch Sprint Championships in speed skating were held in Amsterdam at the Olympic Stadium (Amsterdam) from 28 February to 1 March 2014. The tournament was part of the 2013–2014 speed skating season. Michel Mulder and Margot Boer won the sprint titles. The sprint championships were held together with the 2014 Dutch Allround Championships.

== Schedule ==
Friday 28 February 2014	Saturday 1 March 2014
500 meter women sprint 1st run 500 meter men sprint 1st run 1000 meter women sprint 1st run 1000 meter men sprint 1st run	500 meter women sprint 2nd run 500 meter men sprint 2nd run 1000 meter women sprint 2nd run 1000 meter men sprint 2nd run

== Medalist ==
Event	Gold		Silver		Bronze	
Women's Sprint overall	Margot Boer	156.360	Lotte van Beek	156.625	Thijsje Oenema	159.315
Men's Sprint overall	Michel Mulder	142.700	Hein Otterspeer	142.775	Kjeld Nuis	142.850

=== Men's sprint ===
Event	1st place, gold medalist(s)	2nd place, silver medalist(s)	3rd place, bronze medalist(s)
Classification	Michel Mulder	Hein Otterspeer	Kjeld Nuis
500 meter (1st)	Michel Mulder	Jan Smeekens	Jesper Hospes
1000 meter (1st)	Kjeld Nuis	Thomas Krol	Hein Otterspeer
500 meter (2nd)	Michel Mulder	Jan Smeekens	Hein Otterspeer
1000 meter (2nd)	Hein Otterspeer	Kjeld Nuis	Stefan Groothuis

=== Women's sprint ===
Event	1st place, gold medalist(s)	2nd place, silver medalist(s)	3rd place, bronze medalist(s)
Classification	Margot Boer	Lotte van Beek	Thijsje Oenema
500 meter (1st)	Margot Boer	Lotte van Beek	Floor van den Brandt
1000 meter (1st)	Ireen Wüst	Lotte van Beek	Margot Boer
500 meter (2nd)	Margot Boer	Lotte van Beek	Laurine van Riessen
1000 meter (2nd)	Lotte van Beek	Margot Boer	Marrit Leenstra

== Classification ==
=== Men's sprint ===
Position	Skater	Total points Samalog	500m	1000m	500m	1000m
1st place, gold medalist(s)	Michel Mulder	142.700 TR	35.52 (1) TR	1:11.99 (4)	35.44 (1) TR	1:11.49 (6)
2nd place, silver medalist(s)	Hein Otterspeer	142.775	35.75 (4)	1:11.81 (3)	35.76 (3)	1:10.72 (1) TR
3rd place, bronze medalist(s)	Kjeld Nuis	142.850	35.97 (6)	1:11.11 (1) TR	35.81 (4)	1:11.03 (2)
4	Pim Schipper	144.210	36.07 (7)	1:12.41 (6)	36.23 (5)	1:11.41 (4)
5	Jan Smeekens	144.725	35.60 (2)	1:13.17 (10)	35.74 (2)	1:13.60 (13)
6	Stefan Groothuis	144.865	36.07 (07)	1:13.46 (12)	36.44 (8)	1:11.25 (3)
7	Mark Tuitert	145.115	36.69 (12)	1:12.69 (7)	36.35 (7)	1:11.46 (5)
8	Jesper Hospes	145.450	35.62 (3)	1:13.96 (13)	36.23 (5)	1:13.24 (11)
9	Sjoerd de Vries	145.670	36.93 (13)	1:12.38 (5)	36.56 (9)	1:11.98 (7)
10	Aron Romeijn	146.300	36.48 (9)	1:12.87 (8)	36.92 (11)	1:12.93 (10)
11	Lieuwe Mulder	146.885 PR	36.61 (10)	1:14.01 (14)	36.91 (10)	1:12.72 (9)
12	Joost Born	147.885	37.04 (15)	1:13.44 (11)	37.21 (14)	1:13.83 (14)
13	Carlo Cesar	149.025 PR	37.41 (19)	1:14.46 (16)	37.69 (16)	1:13.39 (12)
14	Karsten van Zeijl	149.050	37.15 (16)	1:14.65 (17)	37.61 (15)	1:13.93 (15)
15	Martijn van Oosten	149.155	37.26 (18)	1:14.20 (15)	37.81 (17)	1:13.97 (16)
16	Ruben Romeijn	149.295 PR	36.63 (11)	1:15.39 (21)	37.20 (13)	1:15.54 (20)
17	Paul-Yme Brunsmann	149.820	37.21 (17)	1:14.69 (18)	38.17 (19)	1:14.19 (17)
18	Berend Feldbrugge	150.720 PR	37.64 (20)	1:14.86 (19)	37.94 (18)	1:15.42 (18)
19	Lars Scheenstra	151.520	37.78 (21)	1:15.24 (20)	38.38 (20)	1:15.48 (19)
20	Thomas Krol	164.650	55.77 (22)	1:11.60 (2)	36.94 (12)	1:12.28 (8)
NC	Ronald Mulder	72.390	35.83 (5)	1:13.12 (9)	WDR	
NC	Gerben Jorritsma	37.030	37.03 (14)	DNS		

=== Women's sprint ===
Position	Skater	Total points Samalog	500m	1000m	500m	1000m
1st place, gold medalist(s)	Margot Boer	156.360 TR	38.90 (1) TR	1:18.39 (3)	39.00 (1)	1:18.53 (2)
2nd place, silver medalist(s)	Lotte van Beek	156.625	39.25 (2)	1:18.08 (2)	39.36 (2)	1:17.95 (1)
3rd place, bronze medalist(s)	Thijsje Oenema	159.315	39.69 (6)	1:19.59 (6)	39.85 (4)	1:19.96 (7)
4	Laurine van Riessen	159.425	39.66 (5)	1:20.11 (8)	39.76 (3)	1:19.90 (6)
5	Marrit Leenstra	159.695	40.09 (10)	1:19.48 (5)	40.46 (12)	1:18.81 (3)
6	Manon Kamminga	160.285	40.36 (14)	1:19.21 (4)	40.58 (15)	1:19.48 (4)
7	Letitia de Jong	160.520	40.09 (10)	1:19.66(7)	40.66 (16)	1:19.88(5)
8	Floor van den Brandt	160.725	39.47 (3)	1:21.53 (13)	40.02 (6)	1:20.94 (10)
9	Janine Smit	161.125	40.23 (13)	1:20.14 (9)	40.28 (8)	1:21.09 (11)
10	Rosa Pater	161.525	40.15 (12)	1:22.15 (17)	39.96 (5)	1:20.68 (8)
11	Mayon Kuipers	161.985	39.79 (7)	1:21.85 (14)	40.35 (10)	1:21.84 (13)
12	Bo van der Werff	162.325	40.66 (16)	1:21.06 (11)	40.41 (11)	1:21.45 (12)
13	Annette Gerritsen	162.815	40.53 (15)	1:22.01 (15)	40.31 (9)	1:21.94 (14)
14	Moniek Klijnstra	163.150	40.08 (9)	1:22.69 (18)	40.50 (14)	1:22.45 (16)
15	Roxanne van Hemert	163.715	40.90 (18)	1:21.26 (12)	41.79 (18)	1:20.79 (9)
16	Leeyen Harteveld	165.125 TRjr	41.36 (19) TRjr	1:22.10 (16) TRjr	41.63 (17)	1:22.17 (15)
17	Anna Julia Janssen	167.235	40.85 (17)	1:24.38 (19)	42.07 (19)	1:24.25 (17)
18	Stephanie Wubben	172.530	41.62 (20)	1:28.45 (20)	42.92 (20)	1:27.53 (18)
NC	Ireen Wüst	118.680	40.00 (8)	1:17.12 (1) TR	40.12 (7)	DSQ
NC	Anice Das	120.115	39.54 (4)	1:20.23 (10)	40.46 (12)	WDR
