= 2011 KNSB Dutch Single Distance Championships – Women's 500 m =

- Venue: Thialf, Heerenveen, Netherlands
- Date: 5 November 2010
- Competitors: 22 skaters

Medalist men
1st place, gold medalist(s)		Margot Boer	NED
2nd place, silver medalist(s)		Laurine van Riessen	NED
3rd place, bronze medalist(s)		Marrit Leenstra	NED

The women's 500 meter at the 2011 KNSB Dutch Single Distance Championships took place in Heerenveen at the Thialf ice skating rink on Friday 5 November 2010. Although this edition was held in 2010, it was part of the 2010–2011 speed skating season.

There were 22 participants who raced twice over 500m so that all skaters had to start once in the inner lane and once in the outer lane. There was a qualification selection incentive for the next following 2010–11 ISU Speed Skating World Cup tournaments.

Title holder was Annette Gerritsen.

== Overview ==
=== Result ===
Rank	Skater	Time 1st 500m	Time 2nd 500m	Points Samalog
1st place, gold medalist(s)	Margot Boer	38.72	38.55 (gold)	77.270
2nd place, silver medalist(s)	Laurine van Riessen	38.70 (gold)	38.63	77.330
3rd place, bronze medalist(s)	Marrit Leenstra	39.50	39.48	78.980
4	Anice Das	39.61	39.53 PR	79.140
5	Thijsje Oenema	39.80	39.50	79.300
6	Jorien Kranenborg	39.72	39.61	79.330 PR
7	Janine Smit	39.69	39.65	79.340
8	Sophie Nijman	39.71	39.80	79.510
9	Natasja Bruintjes	39.86	39.70	79.560
10	Mayon Kuipers	39.93	39.85	79.780
11	Lotte van Beek	40.07	39.73	79.800
12	Floor van den Brandt	39.99	39.84	79.830
13	Marit Dekker	39.96 PR	39.90 PR	79.860 PR
14	Britt van der Star	40.22 PR	39.78 PR	80.000 PR
15	Esmeralda Nieuwendorp	40.05 PR	40.11	80.160 PR
16	Roxanne van Hemert	40.43	40.24	80.670
17	Inge Bervoets	40.20 PR	40.72	80.920
18	Bo van der Werff	40.63	40.45 PR	81.080
19	Inge van Essen	40.36	40.82	81.180
20	Moniek Klijnstra	40.75 PR	40.72 PR	81.470
21	Marianne Timmer	39.39	1:28.52 *	127.910
–	Ireen Wüst	39.93	WDR	39.930

WDR = Withdrew
* = Fell

=== Draw 1st 500m ===
Heat	Inner lane	Outer lane
1	Inge van Essen	Inge Bervoets
2	Bo van der Werff	Esmeralda Nieuwendorp
3	Britt van der Star	Marit Dekker
4	Marrit Leenstra	Anice Das
5	Jorien Kranenborg	Janine Smit
6	Roxanne van Hemert	Floor van den Brandt
7	Moniek Klijnstra	Mayon Kuipers
8	Ireen Wüst	Laurine van Riessen
9	Thijsje Oenema	Marianne Timmer
10	Lotte van Beek	Natasja Bruintjes
11	Margot Boer	Sophie Nijman

=== Draw 2nd 500m ===
Heat	Inner lane	Outer lane
1	Inge Bervoets	–
2	Esmeralda Nieuwendorp	Moniek Klijnstra
3	Floor van den Brandt	Bo van der Werff
4	Marit Dekker	Roxanne van Hemert
5	Mayon Kuipers	Inge van Essen
6	Natasja Bruintjes	Britt van der Star
7	Sophie Nijman	Lotte van Beek
8	Janine Smit	Thijsje Oenema
9	Anice Das	Jorien Kranenborg
10	Marianne Timmer	Marrit Leenstra
11	Laurine van Riessen	Margot Boer
