= 2014 KNSB Dutch Single Distance Championships – Women's 500 m =

Competition in Heerenveen on November 26, 2013

- Venue: Thialf, Heerenveen, Netherlands
- Date: 26 October 2013
- Competitors: 22 skaters

Medalist men
1st place, gold medalist(s)		Margot Boer	NED
2nd place, silver medalist(s)		Laurine van Riessen	NED
3rd place, bronze medalist(s)		Thijsje Oenema	NED

The women's 500 meter at the 2014 KNSB Dutch Single Distance Championships took place in Heerenveen at the Thialf ice skating rink on Saturday 26 November 2013. Although this edition was held in 2013, it was part of the 2013–2014 speed skating season.

There were 22 participants who raced twice over 500m so that all skaters had to start once in the inner lane and once in the outer lane. There was a qualification selection incentive for the next following 2013–14 ISU Speed Skating World Cup tournaments.

Title holder was Thijsje Oenema.

== Overview ==
=== Result ===
Rank	Skater	Time 1st 500m	Time 2nd 500m	Points Samalog
1st place, gold medalist(s)	Margot Boer	38.54 (gold)	38.30 (gold)	76.840
2nd place, silver medalist(s)	Laurine van Riessen	38.61 (3)	38.64 (3)	77.250
3rd place, bronze medalist(s)	Thijsje Oenema	38.57 (2)	38.91 (5)	77.480
4	Marrit Leenstra	38.89 (4)	38.83 (4)	77.720
5	Anice Das	39.19 (8)	38.61 (2)	77.800
6	Annette Gerritsen	39.01 (5)	38.99 (7)	78.000
7	Mayon Kuipers	39.12 (7)	38.95 (6)	78.070
8	Janine Smit	39.24 (9)	39.10 (9)	78.340
9	Floor van den Brandt	39.01 (5)	39.36 (12)	78.370
10	Bo van der Werff	39.43 (12)	39.00 (8) PR	78.430
11	Lotte van Beek	39.36 (10)	39.13 (10)	78.490
12	Rosa Pater	39.39 (11)	39.37 (13) PR	78.760
13	Natasja Bruintjes	39.48 (13)	39.41 (14)	78.890
14	Manon Kamminga	39.69 (14)	39.30 (11) PR	78.990
15	Letitia de Jong	39.87 (15)	39.56 (15) PR	79.430
16	Moniek Klijnstra	39.97 (16)	39.72 (16) PR	79.690
17	Sanneke de Neeling	40.01 (17)	40.04 (17)	80.050
18	Roxanne van Hemert	40.29 (18)	40.20 (18)	80.490
19	Leslie Koen	40.38 (19)	40.42 (19)	80.800
20	Bente van den Berge	40.69 (20)	40.50 (20)	81.190
21	Tessa Boogaard	41.32 (21)	40.88 (21) PR	82.200
22	Cerise Tersteeg	41.39 (22)	41.19 (22)	82.580

=== Draw 1st 500m ===
Heat	Inner lane	Outer lane
1	Bente van den Berge	Tessa Boogaard
2	Cerise Tersteeg	Sanneke de Neeling
3	Leslie Koen	Roxanne van Hemert
4	Moniek Klijnstra	Bo van der Werff
5	Rosa Pater	Letitia de Jong
6	Natasja Bruintjes	Floor van den Brandt
7	Manon Kamminga	Janine Smit
8	Mayon Kuipers	Thijsje Oenema
9	Anice Das	Margot Boer
10	Lotte van Beek	Marrit Leenstra
11	Laurine van Riessen	Annette Gerritsen

=== Draw 2nd 500m ===
Heat	Inner lane	Outer lane
1	Tessa Boogaard	Cerise Tersteeg
2	Roxanne van Hemert	Bente van den Berge
3	Sanneke de Neeling	Leslie Koen
4	Letitia de Jong	Moniek Klijnstra
5	Bo van der Werff	Manon Kamminga
6	Janine Smit	Natasja Bruintjes
7	Floor van den Brandt	Rosa Pater
8	Annette Gerritsen	Lotte van Beek
9	Marrit Leenstra	Anice Das
10	Thijsje Oenema	Mayon Kuipers
11	Margot Boer	Laurine van Riessen
