= 2014 KNSB Dutch Single Distance Championships – Women's 1000 m =

- Venue: Thialf, Heerenveen, Netherlands
- Date: 27 October 2013
- Competitors: 24 skaters

Medalist men
1st place, gold medalist(s)		Marrit Leenstra	NED
2nd place, silver medalist(s)		Ireen Wüst	NED
3rd place, bronze medalist(s)		Lotte van Beek	NED

The women's 1000 meter at the 2014 KNSB Dutch Single Distance Championships took place in Heerenveen at the Thialf ice skating rink on Sunday 27 October 2013. Although this tournament was held in 2013, it was part of the speed skating season 2013–2014.

There were 24 participants.

Title holder was Marrit Leenstra.

== Result ==
Rank	Skater	Time
1st place, gold medalist(s)	Marrit Leenstra	1:15.38
2nd place, silver medalist(s)	Ireen Wüst	1:15.42
3rd place, bronze medalist(s)	Lotte van Beek	1:15.49
4	Margot Boer	1:15.55
5	Jorien ter Mors	1:15.89 PR
6	Manon Kamminga	1:16.59 PR
7	Laurine van Riessen	1:16.70
8	Antoinette de Jong	1:16.78
9	Natasja Bruintjes	1:16.93
10	Thijsje Oenema	1:16.98
11	Sanneke de Neeling	1:17.18 PR
12	Letitia de Jong	1:17.23 PR
13	Anice Das	1:17.50
14	Janine Smit	1:17.65 PR
15	Annette Gerritsen	1:17.91
16	Roxanne van Hemert	1:17.95
17	Bo van der Werff	1:18.05 PR
18	Floor van den Brandt	1:18.14
19	Mayon Kuipers	1:18.19 PR
20	Irene Schouten	1:18.41 PR
21	Melissa Wijfje	1:18.48 PR
22	Janneke Ensing	1:18.91 PR
23	Rosa Pater	1:19.05
24	Moniek Klijnstra	1:19.81 PR

== Draw ==
Heat	Inner lane	Outer lane
1	Rosa Pater	Bo van der Werff
2	Moniek Klijnstra	Mayon Kuipers
3	Irene Schouten	Janneke Ensing
4	Melissa Wijfje	Floor van den Brandt
5	Annette Gerritsen	Thijsje Oenema
6	Manon Kamminga	Sanneke de Neeling
7	Janine Smit	Natasja Bruintjes
8	Antoinette de Jong	Letitia de Jong
9	Margot Boer	Marrit Leenstra
10	Ireen Wüst	Lotte van Beek
11	Laurine van Riessen	Anice Das
12	Roxanne van Hemert	Jorien ter Mors
