= 2012 KNSB Dutch Single Distance Championships – Women's 1000 m =

- Venue: Thialf, Heerenveen, Netherlands
- Date: 5 November 2011
- Competitors: 22 skaters

Medalist men
1st place, gold medalist(s)		Thijsje Oenema	NED
2nd place, silver medalist(s)		Marrit Leenstra	NED
3rd place, bronze medalist(s)		Ireen Wüst	NED

The women's 1000 meter at the 2012 KNSB Dutch Single Distance Championships took place in Heerenveen at the Thialf ice skating rink on Saturday 5 November 2011. Although this tournament was held in 2011, it was part of the speed skating season 2011–2012.

There were 22 participants.

Title holder was Marrit Leenstra.

== Statistics ==
=== Result ===
Rank	Skater	Time
1st place, gold medalist(s)	Thijsje Oenema	1:16.53 PR
2nd place, silver medalist(s)	Marrit Leenstra	1:16.79
3rd place, bronze medalist(s)	Ireen Wüst	1:16.88
4	Margot Boer	1:16.92
5	Laurine van Riessen	1:17.05
6	Annette Gerritsen	1:17.34
7	Lotte van Beek	1:17.66
8	Anice Das	1:17.91
9	Natasja Bruintjes	1:17.98
10	Janine Smit	1:18.34 PR
11	Floor van den Brandt	1:18.59 PR
12	Paulien van Deutekom	1:18.79
13	Letitia de Jong	1:19.042 PR
14	Sophie Nijman	1:19.044
15	Ingeborg Kroon	1:19.16
16	Bo van der Werff	1:19.17 PR
17	Roxanne van Hemert	1:19.21
18	Mayon Kuipers	1:19.31
19	Jorien Kranenborg	1:19.99
20	Reina Anema	1:21.26
21	Emma van Rijn	1:21.34 PR
22	Esmeralda Nieuwendorp	1:22.78

=== Draw ===
Heat	Inner lane	Outer lane
1	Esmeralda Nieuwendorp	Reina Anema
2	Emma van Rijn	Letitia de Jong
3	Floor van den Brandt	Paulien van Deutekom
4	Ingeborg Kroon	Janine Smit
5	Mayon Kuipers	Jorien Kranenborg
6	Thijsje Oenema	Lotte van Beek
7	Bo van der Werff	Anice Das
8	Ireen Wüst	Laurine van Riessen
9	Annette Gerritsen	Roxanne van Hemert
10	Marrit Leenstra	Natasja Bruintjes
11	Margot Boer	Sophie Nijman
