= 2016 KNSB Dutch Single Distance Championships – Women's 1000 m =

- Venue: Thialf, Heerenveen, Netherlands
- Date: 29 December 2015
- Competitors: 22 skaters

Medalist men
1st place, gold medalist(s)		Jorien ter Mors	NED
2nd place, silver medalist(s)		Marrit Leenstra	NED
3rd place, bronze medalist(s)		Ireen Wüst	NED

The women's 1000 meter at the 2016 KNSB Dutch Single Distance Championships took place in Heerenveen at the Thialf ice skating rink on Sunday 29 December 2015. Though this tournament was held in 2015, it was part of the speed skating season 2015–2016. There were 22 participants.

Title holder was Marrit Leenstra.

== Result ==
Rank	Skater	Time
1st place, gold medalist(s)	Jorien ter Mors	1:15.17
2nd place, silver medalist(s)	Marrit Leenstra	1:16.27
3rd place, bronze medalist(s)	Ireen Wüst	1:16.29
4	Sanneke de Neeling	1:16.59
5	Margot Boer	1:16.62
6	Anice Das	1:17.65
7	Janine Smit	1:17.66
8	Roxanne van Hemert	1:17.68
9	Annouk van der Weijden	1:17.88
10	Linda de Vries	1:18.14
11	Suzanne Schulting	1:18.36
12	Letitia de Jong	1:18.41
13	Bo van der Werff	1:18.93
14	Rosa Pater	1:19.01
15	Lotte van Beek	1:19.15
16	Annette Gerritsen	1:19.29
17	Sanne van der Schaar	1:19.50
18	Melissa Wijfje	1:19.73
19	Isabelle van Elst	1:19.81
20	Floor van den Brandt	1:19.92
21	Julia Berentschot	1:19.98
22	Moniek Klijnstra	2:01.41
–	Antoinette de Jong	WDR

WDR = Withdrew
