= 2011 KNSB Dutch Sprint Championships =

KNSB Dutch Sprint Championships
- Venue: Thialf, Heerenveen
- Dates: 27 and 28 December 2010
- Competitors: 46

Medalist men
1st place, gold medalist(s)		Stefan Groothuis	NED
2nd place, silver medalist(s)		Jan Smeekens	NED
3rd place, bronze medalist(s)		Jan Bos	NED

Medalist women
1st place, gold medalist(s)		Margot Boer	NED
2nd place, silver medalist(s)		Annette Gerritsen	NED
3rd place, bronze medalist(s)		Laurine van Riessen	NED

The 2011 KNSB Dutch Sprint Championships in speed skating were held at the Thialf ice stadium in Heerenveen, Netherlands.

== Schedule ==
Schedule
Date	Event
27 December 2010	Women's 500m 1st run Men's 500m 1st run Women's 1000m 1st run Men's 1000m 1st run
28 December 2010	Women's 500m 2nd run Men's 500m 2nd run Women's 1000m 2nd run Men's 1000m 2nd run

== Medalist ==
Event	Gold		Silver		Bronze	
Women's Sprint	Margot Boer	153.825	Annette Gerritsen	154.625	Laurine van Riessen	154.965
Men's Sprint	Stefan Groothuis	139.060	Jan Smeekens	140.870	Jan Bos	141.110

== Results ==
=== Men's Sprint ===
Place	Athlete	500m	1000m	500m	1000m	Points
1st place, gold medalist(s)	Stefan Groothuis	35.26 (2)	1:08.54 (1)	35.25 (2)	1:08.56 (1)	139.060
2nd place, silver medalist(s)	Jan Smeekens	35.04 (1)	1:10.23 (4)	35.12 (1)	1:11.19 (8)	140.870
3rd place, bronze medalist(s)	Jan Bos	35.51 (3)	1:09.82 (2)	35.69 (6)	1:10.00 (2)	141.110
4	Michel Mulder	35.76 (8)	1:10.64 (9)	35.53 (4)	1:10.41 (5)	141.815
5	Sjoerd de Vries	35.77 (9)	1:09.90 (3)	36.09 (10)	1:10.25 (3)	141.935
6	Remco olde Heuvel	36.02 (12)	1:10.28 (5)	36.11 (11)	1:10.26 (4)	142.400
7	Lars Elgersma	35.90 (10)	1:10.40 (7)	35.93 (8)	1:10.90 (6)	142.480
8	Jacques de Koning	35.54 (4)	1:11.74 (12)	35.54 (5)	07.13 (9)	142.640
9	Jesper Hospes	35.74 (6)	1:12.14 (15)	35.97 (9)	1:12.80 (17)	144.180
10	Jesper van Veen	36.51 (13)	1:11.55 (10)	36.48 (14)	1:11.48 (10)	144.415
11	Rienk Nauta	36.65 (16)	1:11.59 (11)	36.45 (13)	1:11.54 (11)	144.665
12	Rens Boekhoff	36.50 (14)	1:12.19 (16)	36.34 (12)	1:11.84 (12)	144.855
13	Freddy Wennemars	36.51 (15)	1:13.06 (20)	36.74 (15)	1:12.38 (15)	145.970
14	Aron Romeijn	36.92 (17)	1:12.27 (17)	36.87 (16)	1:12.12 (14)	145.985
15	Wietse van der Heide	37.21 (20)	1:12.68 (19)	37.09 (18)	1:11.90 (13)	146.590
16	Lieuwe Mulder	37.09 (19)	1:12.60 (18)	37.29 (19)	1:12.45 (16)	146.905
17	Joep Pennartz	37.39 (22)	1:11.95 (13)	37.40 (20)	1:13.88 (19)	147.705
18	Bart Schipper	37.29 (21)	1:13.33 (21)	37.41 (21)	1:12.85 (18)	147.790
19	Gijs Esders	37.45 (23)	1:13.40 (22)	37.56 (22)	1:13.96 (20)	148.690
20	Hein Otterspeer	1:21.34 (24)	1:10.29 (6)	35.40 (3)	1:10.96 (7)	187.365
DNS4	Demian Roelofs	37.06 (18)	1:12.13 (14)	37.04 (17)	DNS	110.165
DQ3	Pim Schipper	35.95 (11)	1:10.47 (8)	DQ	-	71.185
DQ2	Kjeld Nuis	35.65 (5)	DQ	35.88 (7)	-	71.530
DNS2	Simon Kuipers	35.75 (7)	DNS	-	-	35.750

Note:
DNS = Did Not Start
DQ = Disqualified

Men's results: SchaatsStatistieken.nl

=== Women's Sprint ===
Place	Athlete	500m	1000m	500m	1000m	Points
1st place, gold medalist(s)	Margot Boer	38.49 (1)	1:17.06 (3)	38.38 (1)	1:16.85 (3)	153.825
2nd place, silver medalist(s)	Annette Gerritsen	38.68 (2)	1:16.93 (2)	38.84 (2)	1:17.28 (4)	154.625
3rd place, bronze medalist(s)	Laurine van Riessen	38.89 (3)	1:17.37 (4)	39.06 (4)	1:16.66 (2)	154.965
4	Ireen Wüst	39.18 (5)	1:16.60 (1)	39.51 (8)	1:16.52 (1)	155.250
5	Thijsje Oenema	39.05 (4)	1:18.86 (10)	39.01 (3)	1:18.31 (8)	156.645
6	Sophie Nijman	39.32 (6)	1:17.81 (5)	39.51 (8)	1:17.88 (6)	156.675
7	Natasja Bruintjes	39.63 (9)	1:18.46 (8)	39.50 (6)	1:17.92 (7)	157.320
8	Anice Das	39.39 (7)	1:18.35 (7)	39.79 (10)	1:18.61 (10)	157.660
9	Janine Smit	39.78 (10)	1:18.47 (9)	39.50 (6)	1:18.39 (9)	157.710
10	Roxanne van Hemert	40.31 (21)	1:18.34 (6)	40.05 (14)	1:17.85 (5)	158.455
11	Mayon Kuipers	39.40 (8)	1:20.75 (17)	39.24 (5)	1:19.15 (11)	158.590
12	Jorien Kranenborg	39.95 (13)	1:19.66 (13)	39.94 (12)	1:19.22 (12)	159.330
13	Floor van den Brandt	39.85 (12)	1:20.02 (14)	39.81 (11)	1:19.40 (14)	159.370
14	Marit Dekker	39.82 (11)	1:20.34 (15)	39.99 (13)	1:19.81 (15)	159.900
15	Letitia de Jong	40.10 (16)	1:19.35 (12)	40.62 (18)	1:19.38 (13)	160.085
16	Esmeralda Nieuwendorp	40.10 (16)	1:20.75 (17)	40.20 (15)	1:20.88 (17)	161.115
17	Rosa Pater	40.08 (15)	1:21.50 (20)	40.50 (16)	1:20.60 (16)	161.630
18	Inge Bervoets	40.15 (18)	1:20.90 (19)	40.67 (19)	1:20.88 (17)	161.710
19	Inge van Essen	40.27 (20)	1:21.50 (20)	40.58 (17)	1:22.26 (19)	162.730
DNS3	Lotte van Beek	40.23 (19)	1:19.05 (11)	DNS	-	79.755
DNS2	Marianne Timmer	40.03 (14)	DNS	-	-	40.030
DQ1	Bo van der Werff	DQ	1:20.41 (16)	41.15 (20)	-	81.355

Note:
DNS = Did Not Start
DQ = Disqualified

Women's results: SchaatsStatistieken.nl
