= 2013 KNSB Dutch Single Distance Championships – Women's 500 m =

- Venue: Thialf, Heerenveen, Netherlands
- Date: 10 November 2012
- Competitors: 22 skaters

Medalist men
1st place, gold medalist(s)		Thijsje Oenema	NED
2nd place, silver medalist(s)		Margot Boer	NED
3rd place, bronze medalist(s)		Laurine van Riessen	NED

The women's 500 meter at the 2013 KNSB Dutch Single Distance Championships took place in Heerenveen at the Thialf ice skating rink on Saturday 10 November 2012. Although this edition was held in 2012, it was part of the 2012–2013 speed skating season.

There were 22 participants who raced twice over 500m so that all skaters had to start once in the inner lane and once in the outer lane. There was a qualification selection incentive for the next following 2012–13 ISU Speed Skating World Cup tournaments.

Title holder was Thijsje Oenema.

== Overview ==
=== Result ===
Rank	Skater	Time 1st 500m	Time 2nd 500m	Points Samalog
1st place, gold medalist(s)	Thijsje Oenema	38.51 (gold)	38.36 (gold)	76.870
2nd place, silver medalist(s)	Margot Boer	38.66 (2)	38.62 (3)	77.280
3rd place, bronze medalist(s)	Laurine van Riessen	38.81 (4)	38.52 (2)	77.330
4	Anice Das	38.73 (3) PR	38.87 (6)	77.600
5	Marrit Leenstra	39.06 (7)	38.73 (4)	77.790
6	Annette Gerritsen	38.92 (6)	38.99 (7)	77.920
7	Lotte van Beek	39.01 (6)	39.12 (8)	78.130
8	Mayon Kuipers	39.37 (10)	38.86 (5)	78.230
9	Janine Smit	39.23 (9)	39.13 (9)	78.360
10	Natasja Bruintjes	39.16 (8)	39.42 (10)	78.580
11	Marit Dekker	39.37 (10) PR	39.48 (11)	78.850
12	Floor van den Brandt	39.61 (12)	39.50 (12)	79.110
13	Bo van der Werff	39.76 (13)	39.72 (13) PR	79.480
14	Moniek Klijnstra	39.82 (14) PR	39.90 (16)	79.720
15	Letitia de Jong	39.95 (19)	39.78 (14)	79.730
16	Leslie Koen	39.941 (18)	39.870 (15)	79.811
17	Manon Kamminga	39.897 (17) PR	39.926 (17)	79.823
18	Britt van der Star	39.88 (16)	40.02 (18)	79.900
19	Rosa Pater	39.83 (15)	40.26 (20)	80.090
19	Bente van den Berge	40.37 (20) PR	40.13 (19) PR	80.500 PR
21	Emma van Rijn	40.42 (21)	40.66 (21)	81.080
22	Anna Julia Janssen	41.44 (22)	41.19 (22) PR	82.630

=== Draw 1st 500m ===
Heat	Inner lane	Outer lane
1	Anna Julia Janssen	Emma van Rijn
2	Moniek Klijnstra	Bente van den Berge
3	Manon Kamminga	Leslie Koen
4	Rosa Pater	Floor van den Brandt
5	Lotte van Beek	Letitia de Jong
6	Natasja Bruintjes	Marit Dekker
7	Britt van der Star	Bo van der Werff
8	Marrit Leenstra	Anice Das
9	Mayon Kuipers	Laurine van Riessen
10	Annette Gerritsen	Thijsje Oenema
11	Margot Boer	Janine Smit

=== Draw 2nd 500m ===
Heat	Inner lane	Outer lane
1	Emma van Rijn	Anna Julia Janssen
2	Bente van den Berge	Manon Kamminga
3	Letitia de Jong	Britt van der Star
4	Leslie Koen	Rosa Pater
5	Bo van der Werff	Moniek Klijnstra
6	Floor van den Brandt	Mayon Kuipers
7	Marit Dekker	Natasja Bruintjes
8	Janine Smit	Marrit Leenstra
9	Laurine van Riessen	Lotte van Beek
10	Anice Das	Annette Gerritsen
11	Thijsje Oenema	Margot Boer
