= 2013 KNSB Dutch Single Distance Championships – Women's 1000 m =

- Venue: Thialf, Heerenveen, Netherlands
- Date: 11 November 2012
- Competitors: 24 skaters

Medalist men
| 1st place, gold medalist(s) | | Marrit Leenstra | NED |
| 2nd place, silver medalist(s) | | Lotte van Beek | NED |
| 3rd place, bronze medalist(s) | | Diane Valkenburg | NED |

The women's 1000 meter at the 2013 KNSB Dutch Single Distance Championships took place in Heerenveen at the Thialf ice skating rink on Sunday 11 November 2012. Although this tournament was held in 2012, it was part of the speed skating season 2012–2013.

There were 24 participants.

Title holder was Thijsje Oenema.

== Statistics ==
=== Result ===
| Rank | Skater | Time |
|---|---|---|
| 1st place, gold medalist(s) | Marrit Leenstra | 1:16.39 |
| 2nd place, silver medalist(s) | Lotte van Beek | 1:16.97 |
| 3rd place, bronze medalist(s) | Diane Valkenburg | 1:17.07 |
| 4 | Laurine van Riessen | 1:17.14 |
| 5 | Anice Das | 1:17.16 |
| 6 | Ireen Wüst | 1:17.32 |
| 7 | Margot Boer | 1:17.67 |
| 8 | Natasja Bruintjes | 1:17.82 |
| 9 | Annette Gerritsen | 1:18.10 |
| 10 | Janine Smit | 1:18.26(2) |
| 11 | Antoinette de Jong | 1:18.26(3) |
| 12 | Linda de Vries | 1:18.38 |
| 13 | Thijsje Oenema | 1:18.40 |
| 14 | Marit Dekker | 1:18.47 |
| 15 | Manon Kamminga | 1:18.60 |
| 16 | Letitia de Jong | 1:18.66 |
| 17 | Reina Anema | 1:19.10 |
| 18 | Bo van der Werff | 1:19.28 |
| 19 | Irene Schouten | 1:19.29 |
| 20 | Floor van den Brandt | 1:19.36 |
| 21 | Roxanne van Hemert | 1:19.75 |
| 22 | Emma van Rijn | 1:21.27 PR |
| 23 | Cerise Tersteeg | 1:21.42 PR |
| 24 | Leslie Koen | 1:21.71 |

=== Draw ===
| Heat | Inner lane | Outer lane |
|---|---|---|
| 1 | Leslie Koen | Marit Dekker |
| 2 | Bo van der Werff | Emma van Rijn |
| 3 | Cerise Tersteeg | Irene Schouten |
| 4 | Reina Anema | Manon Kamminga |
| 5 | Diane Valkenburg | Janine Smit |
| 6 | Floor van den Brandt | Antoinette de Jong |
| 7 | Letitia de Jong | Linda de Vries |
| 8 | Anice Das | Natasja Bruintjes |
| 9 | Laurine van Riessen | Roxanne van Hemert |
| 10 | Annette Gerritsen | Marrit Leenstra |
| 11 | Ireen Wüst | Margot Boer |
| 12 | Lotte van Beek | Thijsje Oenema |
