= 2015 KNSB Dutch Single Distance Championships – Women's 500 m =

- Venue: Thialf, Heerenveen, Netherlands
- Date: 1 November 2014
- Competitors: 24 skaters

Medalist men
1st place, gold medalist(s)		Margot Boer	NED
2nd place, silver medalist(s)		Thijsje Oenema	NED
3rd place, bronze medalist(s)		Bo van der Werff	NED

The women's 500 meter at the 2015 KNSB Dutch Single Distance Championships took place in Heerenveen at the Thialf ice skating rink on Saturday 1 November 2014. Although this edition was held in 2014, it was part of the 2014–2015 speed skating season.

There were 24 participants who raced twice over 500m so that all skaters had to start once in the inner lane and once in the outer lane. There was a qualification selection incentive for the next following 2014–15 ISU Speed Skating World Cup tournaments.

Title holder was Margot Boer.

== Overview ==
=== Result ===
Rank	Skater	Time 1st 500m	Time 2nd 500m	Points Samalog
1st place, gold medalist(s)	Margot Boer	38.31 (gold)	38.39 (2)	76.700
2nd place, silver medalist(s)	Thijsje Oenema	38.52 (2)	38.37 (gold)	76.890
3rd place, bronze medalist(s)	Bo van der Werff	38.84 (3)	38.61 (5)	77.450 PR
4	Floor van den Brandt	38.88 (4)	38.60 (4)	77.480
5	Anice Das	39.00 (8)	38.50 (3)	77.500 PR
6	Annette Gerritsen	38.90 (5)	38.76 (6)	77.660
7	Mayon Kuipers	38.95 (6)	38.83 (7)	77.780
8	Laurine van Riessen	38.97 (7)	38.89 (8)	77.860
9	Janine Smit	39.16 (9)	38.99 (9)	78.150
10	Letitia de Jong	39.30 (10)	39.22 (10)	78.520 PR
11	Manon Kamminga	39.40 (11)	39.35 (11)	78.750
12	Rosa Pater	39.70 (14)	39.43 (12)	79.130
13	Moniek Klijnstra	39.67 (13)	39.53 (13)	79.200
14	Emma van Rijn	39.60 (12) PR	39.90 (14)	79.500 PR
15	Sanneke de Neeling	40.05 (15)	40.05 (15)	80.100
16	Bente van den Berge	40.33 (16)	40.12 (16)	80.450
17	Leeyen Harteveld	40.56 (18)	40.17 (17)	80.730 PR
18	Aveline Hijlkema	40.46 (17)	40.36 (18)	80.820 PR
19	Danouk Bannink	40.75 (19)	40.71 (20)	81.460 PR
20	Tessa Boogaard	40.83 (21)	40.69 (19)	81.520 PR
21	Dione Voskamp	40.81 (20)	41.20 (24)	82.010
22	Julia Berentschot	41.18 (22)	41.19 (23)	82.370 PR
23	Maaike Laagland	41.37 (23)	41.12 (22) PR	82.490 PR
24	Naomi Weeland	41.51 (24)	41.10 (21)	82.610

=== Draw 1st 500m ===
Heat	Inner lane	Outer lane
1	Bente van den Berge	Leeyen Harteveld
2	Tessa Boogaard	Aveline Hijlkema
3	Maaike Laagland	Naomi Weeland
4	Danouk Bannink	Julia Berentschot
5	Sanneke de Neeling	Letitia de Jong
6	Manon Kamminga	Emma van Rijn
7	Bo van der Werff	Rosa Pater
8	Moniek Klijnstra	Dione Voskamp
9	Julia Berentschot	Mayon Kuipers
10	Annette Gerritsen	Margot Boer
11	Thijsje Oenema	Janine Smit
12	Laurine van Riessen	Anice Das

=== Draw 2nd 500m ===
Heat	Inner lane	Outer lane
1	Naomi Weeland	Maaike Laagland
2	Julia Berentschot	Tessa Boogaard
3	Dione Voskamp	Danouk Bannink
4	Leeyen Harteveld	Bente van den Berge
5	Aveline Hijlkema	Sanneke de Neeling
6	Rosa Pater	Moniek Klijnstra
7	Emma van Rijn	Manon Kamminga
8	Letitia de Jong	Laurine van Riessen
9	Janine Smit	Annette Gerritsen
10	Anice Das	Julia Berentschot
11	Mayon Kuipers	Bo van der Werff
12	Margot Boer	Thijsje Oenema
