= 2016 KNSB Dutch Single Distance Championships – Women's 500 m =

Dutch speed skating event

- Venue: Thialf, Heerenveen, Netherlands
- Date: 28 December 2015
- Competitors: 20 skaters

Medalist men
1st place, gold medalist(s)		Margot Boer	NED
2nd place, silver medalist(s)		Janine Smit	NED
3rd place, bronze medalist(s)		Marrit Leenstra	NED

The women's 500 meter at the 2016 KNSB Dutch Single Distance Championships took place in Heerenveen at the Thialf ice skating rink on Monday 28 December 2015. Although this edition was held in 2015, it was part of the 2015–2016 speed skating season.

There were 20 participants, with one withdrawal, who raced twice over 500m so that all skaters had to start once in the inner lane and once in the outer lane. There was a qualification selection incentive for the next following 2015–16 ISU Speed Skating World Cup tournaments.

Title holder was Margot Boer.

== Overview ==
=== Result ===
Rank	Skater	Time 1st 500m	Time 2nd 500m	Points Samalog
1st place, gold medalist(s)	Margot Boer	38.60 (gold)	38.66 (2)	77.275
2nd place, silver medalist(s)	Janine Smit	39.08 (5)	38.52 (gold)	77.611PR
3rd place, bronze medalist(s)	Marrit Leenstra	38.86 (3)	38.85 (4)	77.711
4	Floor van den Brandt	38.74 (2)	38.97 (6)	77.724
5	Mayon Kuipers	39.01 (4)	38.84 (3)	77.868
6	Anice Das	39.22 (6)	38.92 (5)	78.151
7	Bo van der Werff	39.23 (7)	39.15 (7)	78.386
8	Annette Gerritsen	39.48 (9)	39.25 (8)	78.739
9	Rosa Pater	39.34 (8)	39.61 (11)	78.957
10	Moniek Klijnstra	39.55 (10)	39.47 (9)	79.026
11	Letitia de Jong	39.55 (11)	39.54 (10)	79.099
12	Bente van den Berge	39.86 (12)	39.71 (12) PR	79.576PR
13	Dione Voskamp	40.00 (13) PR	39.95 (13) PR	79.961PR
14	Lotte van Beek	40.16 (14)	40.03 (14)	80.207
15	Naomi Weeland	40.45 (15)	40.19 (15) PR	80.644PR
16	Manouk van Tol	40.73 (19)	40.632 (16)	81.368
17	Aveline Hijlkema	40.61 (16)	40.88 (19)	81.491
18	Isabelle van Elst	40.68 (17)	40.85 (18)	81.541
19	Danouk Bannink	40.72 (18)	40.96 (20)	81.690
20	Leeyen Harteveld	41.09 (20)	40.639 (17)	81.732
WDR	Jorien ter Mors	–	–	–

=== Draw 1st 500m ===
Heat	Inner lane	Outer lane
1	Leeyen Harteveld	Manouk van Tol
2	Aveline Hijlkema	Dione Voskamp
3	Bente van den Berge	Rosa Pater
4	Annette Gerritsen	Isabelle van Elst
5	Lotte van Beek	Danouk Bannink
6	Mayon Kuipers	Naomi Weeland
7	Marrit Leenstra	Bo van der Werff
8	Janine Smit	Moniek Klijnstra
9	Anice Das	Letitia de Jong
10	Floor van den Brandt	Margot Boer

=== Draw 2nd 500m ===
Heat	Inner lane	Outer lane
1	Manouk van Tol	Leeyen Harteveld
2	Danouk Bannink	Aveline Hijlkema
3	Isabelle van Elst	Lotte van Beek
4	Naomi Weeland	Bente van den Berge
5	Dione Voskamp	Annette Gerritsen
6	Letitia de Jong	Anice Das
7	Moniek Klijnstra	Janine Smit
8	Rosa Pater	Mayon Kuipers
9	Bo van der Werff	Marrit Leenstra
10	Margot Boer	Floor van den Brandt
