= 2012 KNSB Dutch Single Distance Championships – Women's 500 m =

- Venue: Thialf, Heerenveen, Netherlands
- Date: 4–5 November 2011
- Competitors: 22 skaters

Medalist men
| 1st place, gold medalist(s) | | Thijsje Oenema | NED |
| 2nd place, silver medalist(s) | | Margot Boer | NED |
| 3rd place, bronze medalist(s) | | Annette Gerritsen | NED |

The women's 500 meter at the 2012 KNSB Dutch Single Distance Championships took place in Heerenveen at the Thialf ice skating rink on 4–5 November 2011. Although this edition was held in 2011, it was part of the 2011–2012 speed skating season.

There were 22 participants who raced twice over 500m so that all skaters had to start once in the inner lane and once in the outer lane. There was a qualification selection incentive for the next following 2011–12 ISU Speed Skating World Cup tournaments.

Title holder was Margot Boer.

== Overview ==
=== Result ===
| Rank | Skater | Time 1st 500m | Time 2nd 500m | Points Samalog |
|---|---|---|---|---|
| 1st place, gold medalist(s) | Thijsje Oenema | 38.41 (gold) | 38.68 (gold) | 77.090 |
| 2nd place, silver medalist(s) | Margot Boer | 38.65 (2) | 38.83 (2) | 77.480 |
| 3rd place, bronze medalist(s) | Annette Gerritsen | 38.93 (3) | 38.94 (3) | 77.870 |
| 4 | Laurine van Riessen | 39.27 (5) | 39.04 (4) | 78.310 |
| 5 | Anice Das | 39.15 (4) PR | 39.18 (5) | 78.330 |
| 6 | Janine Smit | 39.34 (8) PR | 39.24 (6) PR | 78.580 |
| 7 | Floor van den Brandt | 39.29 (6) PR | 39.38 (7) | 78.670 |
| 8 | Sophie Nijman | 39.83 (13) | 39.62 (8) | 79.450 |
| 9 | Jorien Kranenborg | 39.82 (12) | 39.82 (9) | 79.640 |
| 10 | Marit Dekker | 39.80 (11) PR | 39.91 (11) | 79.710 |
| 11 | Britt van der Star | 39.98 (14) | 39.84 (10) | 79.820 PR |
| 12 | Ingeborg Kroon | 40.10 (15) | 40.08 (13) | 80.180 |
| 13 | Bo van der Werff | 40.246 (17) PR | 40.114 (14) PR | 80.360 PR |
| 14 | Antoinette de Jong | 40.247 (17) PR | 40.114 (14) PR | 80.361 PR |
| 15 | Moniek Klijnstra | 40.32 (20) | 40.04 (12) | 80.372 |
| 16 | Inge Bervoets | 40.13 (16) PR | 40.28 (16) | 80.410 |
| 17 | Rosa Pater | 40.246 (17) | 40.40 (18) | 80.640 |
| 18 | Emma van Rijn | 40.34 (21) PR | 40.49 (19) | 80.830 |
| 19 | Letitia de Jong | 40.82 (22) | 40.34 (17) | 81.160 |
| 20 | Mayon Kuipers | 39.32 (7) | 1:11.93 *(20) | 111.250 |
| – | Marrit Leenstra | 39.39 (9) | WDR | – |
| – | Natasja Bruintjes | 39.41 (10) | WDR | – |

WDR = Withdrew
* = Fell

=== Draw 1st 500m ===
| Heat | Inner lane | Outer lane |
|---|---|---|
| 1 | Letitia de Jong | Ingeborg Kroon |
| 2 | Inge Bervoets | Emma van Rijn |
| 3 | Antoinette de Jong | Bo van der Werff |
| 4 | Marit Dekker | Anice Das |
| 5 | Britt van der Star | Moniek Klijnstra |
| 6 | Janine Smit | Jorien Kranenborg |
| 7 | Rosa Pater | Floor van den Brandt |
| 8 | Marrit Leenstra | Mayon Kuipers |
| 9 | Sophie Nijman | Annette Gerritsen |
| 10 | Thijsje Oenema | Laurine van Riessen |
| 11 | Natasja Bruintjes | Margot Boer |

=== Draw 2nd 500m ===
| Heat | Inner lane | Outer lane |
|---|---|---|
| 1 | Emma van Rijn | – |
| 2 | Moniek Klijnstra | Letitia de Jong |
| 3 | Bo van der Werff | Antoinette de Jong |
| 4 | Ingeborg Kroon | Rosa Pater |
| 5 | Jorien Kranenborg | Inge Bervoets |
| 6 | Mayon Kuipers | Britt van der Star |
| 7 | Floor van den Brandt | Sophie Nijman |
| 8 | Laurine van Riessen | Marit Dekker |
| 9 | Anice Das | |
| 10 | Annette Gerritsen | Janine Smit |
| 11 | Margot Boer | Thijsje Oenema |
