= 2017 KNSB Dutch Single Distance Championships – Women's 500 m =

- Venue: Thialf, Heerenveen, Netherlands
- Date: 29 December 2016
- Competitors: 20 skaters

Medalist men
1st place, gold medalist(s)		Jorien ter Mors	NED
2nd place, silver medalist(s)		Floor van den Brandt	NED
3rd place, bronze medalist(s)		Anice Das	NED

The women's 500 meter at the 2017 KNSB Dutch Single Distance Championships took place in Heerenveen at the Thialf ice skating rink on Thursday 29 December 2016. Although this edition was held in 2016, it was part of the 2016–2017 speed skating season.

There were 20 participants. Beginning this season, there was just one run over 500m. There was a qualification selection incentive for the next following 2016–17 ISU Speed Skating World Cup tournaments.

Title holder was Margot Boer.

== Overview ==
=== Result ===
Rank	Skater	Time
1st place, gold medalist(s)	Jorien ter Mors	38.48
2nd place, silver medalist(s)	Floor van den Brandt	38.66
3rd place, bronze medalist(s)	Anice Das	38.79
4	Marrit Leenstra	38.90
5	Bo van der Werff	39.14
6	Suzanne Schulting	39.17 PR
7	Sanneke de Neeling	39.24
8	Janine Smit	39.29
9	Letitia de Jong	39.371
10	Ireen Wüst	39.375
11	Moniek Klijnstra	39.49
12	Esmé Stollenga	39.49 PR
13	Isabelle van Elst	39.51
14	Jutta Leerdam	39.53 PR
15	Leeyen Harteveld	39.98 PR
16	Tessa Boogaard	40.01
17	Helga Drost	40.06
18	Naomi Weeland	40.22
19	Sanne van der Schaar	40.24
20	Roxanne van Hemert	40.43

=== Draw ===
Heat	Inner lane	Outer lane
1	Leeyen Harteveld	Helga Drost
2	Naomi Weeland	Esmé Stollenga
3	Moniek Klijnstra	Jutta Leerdam
4	Tessa Boogaard	Sanne van der Schaar
5	Isabelle van Elst	Roxanne van Hemert
6	Letitia de Jong	Ireen Wüst
7	Suzanne Schulting	Bo van der Werff
8	Jorien ter Mors	Floor van den Brandt
9	Janine Smit	Anice Das
10	Sanneke de Neeling	Marrit Leenstra
