= 2015 KNSB Dutch Single Distance Championships – Women's 1000 m =

- Venue: Thialf, Heerenveen, Netherlands
- Date: 2 November 2014
- Competitors: 24 skaters

Medalist men
| 1st place, gold medalist(s) | | Marrit Leenstra | NED |
| 2nd place, silver medalist(s) | | Ireen Wüst | NED |
| 3rd place, bronze medalist(s) | | Laurine van Riessen | NED |

The women's 1000 meter at the 2015 KNSB Dutch Single Distance Championships took place in Heerenveen at the Thialf ice skating rink on Sunday 2 November 2014. Although this tournament was held in 2014, it was part of the speed skating season 2014–2015. There were 24 participants.

Title holder was Marrit Leenstra.

== Result ==
| Rank | Skater | Time |
|---|---|---|
| 1st place, gold medalist(s) | Marrit Leenstra | 1:15.17 |
| 2nd place, silver medalist(s) | Ireen Wüst | 1:15.28 |
| 3rd place, bronze medalist(s) | Laurine van Riessen | 1:16.59 |
| 4 | Sanneke de Neeling | 1:16.68 |
| 5 | Roxanne van Hemert | 1:16.84 |
| 6 | Letitia de Jong | 1:16.85 |
| 7 | Janine Smit | 1:16.94 |
| 8 | Margot Boer | 1:17.06 |
| 9 | Manon Kamminga | 1:17.07 |
| 10 | Annette Gerritsen | 1:17.18 |
| 11 | Thijsje Oenema | 1:17.22 |
| 12 | Melissa Wijfje | 1:17.28 |
| 13 | Bo van der Werff | 1:17.38 |
| 14 | Floor van den Brandt | 1:17.45 PR |
| 15 | Linda de Vries | 1:18.08 |
| 16 | Antoinette de Jong | 1:18.14 |
| 17 | Anice Das | 1:18.16 |
| 18 | Irene Schouten | 1:18.67 |
| 19 | Moniek Klijnstra | 1:18.86 |
| 20 | Diane Valkenburg | 1:18.89 |
| 21 | Rosa Pater | 1:19.07 |
| 22 | Leeyen Harteveld | 1:19.53 |
| 23 | Mayon Kuipers | 1:19.98 |
| 24 | Paulien Westerhof | 1:21.32 |
