= 2014 KNSB Dutch Single Distance Championships =

KNSB Dutch Single Distance Championships
- Venue: Thialf, Heerenveen
- Dates: 25-27 October 2013

The 2014 KNSB Dutch Single Distance Championships were held at the Thialf ice stadium in Heerenveen from 25 October until 27 October 2013. Although the tournament was held in 2013 it was the 2014 edition as it is part of the 2013/2014 speed skating season.

== Schedule ==
Schedule
Date	Time	Distance
Friday; 25 October 2013	15:30	Men's 500 meter 1st run Men's 5000 meter Men's 500 meter 2nd run Women's 1500 meter
Saturday; 26 October 2013	14:00	Women's 3000 meter Women's 500 meter 1st run Men's 1500 meter Women's 500 meter 2nd run
Sunday; 27 October 2013	12:15	Women's 5000 meter Men's 1000 meter Women's 1000 meter Men's 10,000 meter

== Medalists ==
=== Men ===
Distance	Gold		Silver		Bronze	
2x500 m details	Jan Smeekens	69.900 (34.98 / 34.92)	Ronald Mulder	69.960 (34.90 / 35.06)	Michel Mulder	70.020 (35.10 / 34.92)
1000 m details	Kjeld Nuis	1:08.84	Koen Verweij	1:09.20	Sjoerd de Vries	1:09.32
1500 m details	Koen Verweij	1:46.22	Kjeld Nuis	1:46.94	Rhian Ket	1:46.98
5000 m details	Sven Kramer	6:12.89	Jorrit Bergsma	6:17.79	Bob de Jong	6:19.20
10,000 m details	Sven Kramer	12:46.96	Jorrit Bergsma	12:52.27	Bob de Jong	12:52.31

Men's results: Schaatsen.nl & SchaatsStatistieken.nl

=== Women ===
Distance	Gold		Silver		Bronze	
2x500 m details	Margot Boer	76.840 (38.54/38.30)	Laurine van Riessen	77.250 (38.61/38.64)	Thijsje Oenema	77.480 (38.57/38.91)
1000 m details	Marrit Leenstra	1:15.38	Ireen Wüst	1:15.42	Lotte van Beek	1:15.49
1500 m details	Jorien ter Mors	1:55.88	Lotte van Beek	1:56.11	Ireen Wüst	1:56.37
3000 m details	Ireen Wüst	4:02.77	Jorien ter Mors	4:04.07	Antoinette de Jong	4:05.07
5000 m details	Yvonne Nauta	7:01.62	Carien Kleibeuker	7:04.02	Antoinette de Jong	4:06.09

Women's results: Schaatsen.nl & SchaatsStatistieken.nl
