= 2017 KNSB Dutch Single Distance Championships – Women's 1000 m =

Dutch speed skater

- Venue: Thialf, Heerenveen, Netherlands
- Date: 30 December 2016
- Competitors: 20 skaters

Medalist men
1st place, gold medalist(s)		Jorien ter Mors	NED
2nd place, silver medalist(s)		Marrit Leenstra	NED
3rd place, bronze medalist(s)		Ireen Wüst	NED

The women's 1000 meter at the 2017 KNSB Dutch Single Distance Championships took place in Heerenveen at the Thialf ice skating rink on Sunday 30 December 2016. Though this tournament was held in 2016, it was part of the speed skating season 2016–2017. There were 20 participants.

Title holder was Jorien ter Mors.

== Result ==
Rank	Skater	Time
1st place, gold medalist(s)	Jorien ter Mors	1:15.15
2nd place, silver medalist(s)	Marrit Leenstra	1:15.25
3rd place, bronze medalist(s)	Ireen Wüst	1:15.98
4	Suzanne Schulting	1:16.17
5	Sanneke de Neeling	1:16.75
6	Letitia de Jong	1:17.74
7	Janine Smit	1:17.80
8	Bo van der Werff	1:17.80
9	Sanne van der Schaar	1:17.81
10	Esmé Stollenga	1:18.10
11	Anice Das	1:18.13
12	Jutta Leerdam	1:18.39
13	Lotte van Beek	1:18.50
14	Leeyen Harteveld	1:18.60
15	Roxanne van Hemert	1:19.19
16	Isabelle van Elst	1:19.39
17	Elisa Dul	1:19.48
18	Sanne in 't Hof	1:20.40
19	Lina Miedema	1:20.68
–	Floor van den Brandt	DNF

DNF = Did not finish
