= 2011 KNSB Dutch Single Distance Championships – Women's 1000 m =

- Venue: Thialf, Heerenveen, Netherlands
- Date: 6 November 2010
- Competitors: 22 skaters

Medalist men
| 1st place, gold medalist(s) | | Marrit Leenstra | NED |
| 2nd place, silver medalist(s) | | Margot Boer | NED |
| 3rd place, bronze medalist(s) | | Laurine van Riessen | NED |

The women's 1000 meter at the 2011 KNSB Dutch Single Distance Championships took place in Heerenveen at the Thialf ice skating rink on Saturday 6 November 2010. Although this tournament was held in 2010, it was part of the speed skating season 2010–2011.

There were 22 participants.

Title holder was Annette Gerritsen.

== Statistics ==
=== Result ===
| Rank | Skater | Time |
|---|---|---|
| 1st place, gold medalist(s) | Marrit Leenstra | 1:16.84 |
| 2nd place, silver medalist(s) | Margot Boer | 1:17.26 |
| 3rd place, bronze medalist(s) | Laurine van Riessen | 1:17.28 |
| 4 | Natasja Bruintjes | 1:17.38 |
| 5 | Ireen Wüst | 1:17.79 |
| 6 | Lotte van Beek | 1:17.96 |
| 7 | Roxanne van Hemert | 1:18.08 |
| 8 | Ingeborg Kroon | 1:18.14 |
| 9 | Marit Dekker | 1:18.18 PR |
| 10 | Marianne Timmer | 1:18.21 |
| 11 | Janine Smit | 1:18.44 |
| 12 | Jorien Kranenborg | 1:18.58 |
| 13 | Anice Das | 1:18.61 |
| 14 | Sophie Nijman | 1:18.64 |
| 15 | Linda de Vries | 1:18.82 |
| 16 | Bo van der Werff | 1:19.25 |
| 17 | Irene Schouten | 1:19.40 |
| 18 | Thijsje Oenema | 1:19.56 |
| 19 | Frederika Buwalda | 1:19.78 |
| 20 | Rixt Meijer | 1:20.26 |
| 21 | Brecht Kramer | 1:20.27 |
| 22 | Jorieke van der Geest | 1:20.52 PR |

=== Draw ===
| Heat | Inner lane | Outer lane |
|---|---|---|
| 1 | Rixt Meijer | Jorieke van der Geest |
| 2 | Marit Dekker | Brecht Kramer |
| 3 | Bo van der Werff | Irene Schouten |
| 4 | Janine Smit | Anice Das |
| 5 | Frederika Buwalda | Marrit Leenstra |
| 6 | Jorien Kranenborg | Thijsje Oenema |
| 7 | Roxanne van Hemert | Linda de Vries |
| 8 | Ingeborg Kroon | Laurine van Riessen |
| 9 | Natasja Bruintjes | Sophie Nijman |
| 10 | Marianne Timmer | Ireen Wüst |
| 11 | Margot Boer | Lotte van Beek |
