= 2010 KNSB Dutch Single Distance Championships – Women's 500 m =

- Venue: Thialf, Heerenveen, Netherlands
- Date: 30 October 2009
- Competitors: 22 skaters

Medalist men
| 1st place, gold medalist(s) | | Annette Gerritsen | NED |
| 2nd place, silver medalist(s) | | Margot Boer | NED |
| 3rd place, bronze medalist(s) | | Marianne Timmer | NED |

The women's 500 meter at the 2010 KNSB Dutch Single Distance Championships took place in Heerenveen at the Thialf ice skating rink on Friday 30 October 2009. Although this edition was held in 2009, it was part of the 2009–2010 speed skating season.

There were 22 participants who raced twice over 500m so that all skaters had to start once in the inner lane and once in the outer lane. There was a qualification selection incentive for the next following 2009–10 ISU Speed Skating World Cup tournaments.

Title holder was Annette Gerritsen.

== Overview ==
=== Result ===
| Rank | Skater | Time 1st 500m | Time 2nd 500m | Points Samalog |
|---|---|---|---|---|
| 1st place, gold medalist(s) | Annette Gerritsen | 38.51 (2) | 38.37 (gold) | 76.880 |
| 2nd place, silver medalist(s) | Margot Boer | 38.44 (gold) | 38.63 (2) | 77.070 |
| 3rd place, bronze medalist(s) | Marianne Timmer | 38.78 (3) | 38.48 (3) | 77.760 |
| 4 | Thijsje Oenema | 39.07 (4) | 39.00 (4) | 78.070 |
| 5 | Laurine van Riessen | 39.47 (5) | 39.48 (5) | 78.950 |
| 6 | Ireen Wüst | 39.54 (6) | 39.57 (7) | 79.110 |
| 7 | Natasja Bruintjes | 39.66 (7) | 39.55 (6) | 79.210 |
| 8 | Mayon Kuipers | 39.70 (8) | 39.58 (8) | 79.280 |
| 9 | Sanne van der Star | 39.88 (9) | 40.07 (10) | 79.950 |
| 10 | Jorien Kranenborg | 39.93 (10) | 40.18 (12) | 80.110 |
| 11 | Ingeborg Kroon | 40.08 (12) | 40.13 (11) | 80.210 |
| 12 | Tosca Hilbrands | 40.42 (17) | 39.88 (9) PR | 80.300 |
| 13 | Floor van den Brandt | 40.12 (13) PR | 40.25 (14) | 80.370 |
| 14 | Anice Das | 40.28 (15) | 40.20 (13) | 80.480 |
| 15 | Lotte van Beek | 40.26 (14) PR | 40.45 (16) | 80.710 |
| 16 | Roxanne van Hemert | 40.34 (16) PR | 40.40 (15) | 80.740 |
| 17 | Janine Smit | 40.62 (18) | 40.71 (18) | 81.330 |
| 18 | Leslie Koen | 40.75 (19) PR | 40.71 (17) PR | 81.460 |
| 19 | Marit Dekker | 40.80 (20) | 40.87 (19) | 81.670 |
| 20 | Sanne Delfgou | 41.13 (22) | 41.51 (20) | 82.640 |
| – | Frederika Buwalda | 40.08 (11) PR | DQ | 40.080 |
| – | Sophie Nijman | 40.83 (21) | DNS | 40.830 |

DQ = Disqualified
DNS = Did not start

=== Draw 1st 500m ===
| Heat | Inner lane | Outer lane |
|---|---|---|
| 1 | Floor van den Brandt | Lotte van Beek |
| 2 | Marit Dekker | Frederika Buwalda |
| 3 | Roxanne van Hemert | Leslie Koen |
| 4 | Sanne Delfgou | Anice Das |
| 5 | Sanne van der Star | Janine Smit |
| 6 | Sophie Nijman | Ingeborg Kroon |
| 7 | Jorien Kranenborg | Tosca Hilbrands |
| 8 | Natasja Bruintjes | Laurine van Riessen |
| 9 | Thijsje Oenema | Marianne Timmer |
| 10 | Annette Gerritsen | Ireen Wüst |
| 11 | Mayon Kuipers | Margot Boer |

=== Draw 2nd 500m ===
| Heat | Inner lane | Outer lane |
|---|---|---|
| 1 | Leslie Koen | – |
| 2 | Janine Smit | Sanne Delfgou |
| 3 | Tosca Hilbrands | Marit Dekker |
| 4 | Anice Das | Roxanne van Hemert |
| 5 | Lotte van Beek | Floor van den Brandt |
| 6 | Ingeborg Kroon | Jorien Kranenborg |
| 7 | Frederika Buwalda | Sanne van der Star |
| 8 | Ireen Wüst | Mayon Kuipers |
| 9 | Laurine van Riessen | Natasja Bruintjes |
| 10 | Marianne Timmer | Thijsje Oenema |
| 11 | Margot Boer | Annette Gerritsen |
