= 2017 KNSB Dutch Sprint Championships =

Dutch speed skating competition

KNSB Dutch Sprint Championships
- Venue: Thialf, Heerenveen
- Dates: 21–22 January 2017
- Competitors: 20 men 20 women

Medalist men
1st place, gold medalist(s)		Ronald Mulder	NED
2nd place, silver medalist(s)		Jan Smeekens	NED
3rd place, bronze medalist(s)		Pim Schipper	NED

Medalist women
1st place, gold medalist(s)		Ireen Wüst	NED
2nd place, silver medalist(s)		Anice Das	NED
3rd place, bronze medalist(s)		Sanneke de Neeling	NED

The 2017 KNSB Dutch Sprint Championships in speed skating were held in Heerenveen at the Thialf ice skating rink from 21 January to 22 January 2017 organized by the Royal Dutch Speed Skating Association (KNSB). The tournament was part of the 2016–2017 speed skating season. Ronald Mulder and Ireen Wüst won the sprint titles. The sprint championships were held at the same time as the 2017 KNSB Dutch Allround Championships.

== Schedule ==
Saturday 21 January 2017	Sunday 22 January 2017
500 meter women sprint 1st run 500 meter men sprint 1st run 1000 meter women sprint 1st run 1000 meter men sprint 1st run	500 meter women sprint 2nd run 500 meter men sprint 2nd run 1000 meter women sprint 2nd run 1000 meter men sprint 2nd run

== Medalist ==
Event	Gold		Silver		Bronze	
Women's Sprint overall	Ireen Wüst	154.225	Anice Das	154.975	Sanneke de Neeling	155.035
Men's Sprint overall	Ronald Mulder	139.555	Jan Smeekens	140.645	Pim Schipper	141.125

=== Men's sprint ===
Event	1st place, gold medalist(s)	2nd place, silver medalist(s)	3rd place, bronze medalist(s)
Classification	Ronald Mulder	Jan Smeekens	Pim Schipper
500 meter (1st)	Jan Smeekens	Ronald Mulder	Dai Dai N'tab
1000 meter (1st)	Hein Otterspeer	Ronald Mulder	Lucas van Alphen
500 meter (2nd)	Jan Smeekens; Dai Dai N'tab		Ronald Mulder
1000 meter (2nd)	Ronald Mulder	Thomas Krol	Pim Schipper

=== Women's sprint ===
Event	1st place, gold medalist(s)	2nd place, silver medalist(s)	3rd place, bronze medalist(s)
Classification	Ireen Wüst	Anice Das	Sanneke de Neeling
500 meter (1st)	Sanneke de Neeling	Floor van den Brandt	Anice Das
1000 meter (1st)	Ireen Wüst	Sanneke de Neeling	Anice Das
500 meter (2nd)	Floor van den Brandt	Anice Das	Sanneke de Neeling
1000 meter (2nd)	Ireen Wüst	Letitia de Jong	Anice Das

== Classification ==
=== Men's sprint ===
Position	Skater	Total points Samalog	500m	1000m	500m	1000m
1st place, gold medalist(s)	Ronald Mulder	139.555	34.98 (2)	1:10.01 (2)	35.00 (3)	1:09.14 (1)
2nd place, silver medalist(s)	Jan Smeekens	140.645	34.85 (1)	1:10.77 (8)	34.94 (1)	1:10.44 (9)
3rd place, bronze medalist(s)	Pim Schipper	141.125	35.65 (7)	1:10.29 (5)	35.42 (4)	1:09.82 (3)
4	Dai Dai N'tab	141.130	35.08 (3)	1:11.33 (11)	34.94 (1)	1:10.89 (8)
5	Thomas Krol	141.365	35.82 (10)	1:10.27 (4)	35.77 (10)	1:09.28 (2)
6	Michel Mulder	141.765	35.43 (4)	1:11.04 (10)	35.51 (5)	1:10.61 (7)
7	Martijn van Oosten	142.010	35.62 (6)	1:10.60 (7)	35.90 (13)	1:10.38 (6)
8	Lennart Velema	14.020	36.11 (14)	1:10.37 (6)	35.71 (9)	1:10.03 (5)
9	Lucas van Alphen	142.045	35.93 (12)	1:10.15 (3)	36.06 (14)	1:109.96 (4)
10	Gerben Jorritsma	142.650	35.88 (11)	1:11.01 (9)	35.62 (8)	1:11.29 (11)
11	Gijs Esders	143.425	36.36 (17)	1:11.38 (12)	35.86 (11)	1:11.03 (10)
12	Jesper Hospes	143.850	35.68 (9)	1:12.54 (12)	35.90 (12)	1:12.00 (14)
13	Aron Romeijn	143.890	35.94 (13)	1:11.71 (14)	36.15 (15)	1:11.89 (13)
14	Thijs Roozen	145.040	36.66 (18)	1:12.12 (15)	36.50 (17)	1:11.64 (12
15	Niek Deelstra	145.770	36.17 (15)	1:12.96 (18)	36.68 (19)	1:12.88 (16)
16	Frerik Scheffer	146.185	37.02 (19)	1:12.71 (17)	36.62 (18)	1:12.38 (15)
NC	Hein Otterspeer	105.980	35.66 (8)	1:09.44 (1)	35.60 (7)	DNS
NC	Joost Born	108.330	36.21 (16)	1:11.62 (13)	36.31 (16)	DNF
NC	Sjoerd de Vries	71.130	35.55 (5)	DNF	35.58 (6)	
NC	Sander Meijerink	WDR				

=== Women's sprint ===
Position	Skater	Total points Samalog	500m	1000m	500m	1000m
1st place, gold medalist(s)	Ireen Wüst	154.225	39.28 (5)	1:15.73 (1)	39.20 (5)	1:15.76 (1)
2nd place, silver medalist(s)	Anice Das	154.975	38.95 (3)	1:17.21 (3)	38.82 (2)	1:17.20 (3)
3rd place, bronze medalist(s)	Sanneke de Neeling	155.035	38.88 (1)	1:16.92 (2)	38.98 (3)	1:17.43 (4)
4	Floor van den Brandt	155.850	38.93 (2)	1:18.12 (4)	38.78 (1)	1:18.16 (7)
5	Letitia de Jong	156.390	39.46 (6)	1:18.35 (8)	39.23 (7)	1:17.05 (2)
6	Janine Smit	156.405	39.14 (4)	1:18.21 (7)	39.02 (4)	1:18.28 (8)
7	Bo van der Werff	157.380	39.56 (7)	1:18.74 (10)	39.21 (6)	1:18.48 (9)
8	Lotte van Beek	158.060	39.93 (9)	1:18.17 (5)	40.01 (12)	1:18.07 (5)
9	Tessa Boogaard	158.385	39.93 (9)	1:19.37 (12)	39.48 (8) PR	1:18.58 (10) PR
10	Roxanne van Hemert	158.525	40.32 (14)	1:18.19 (6)	40.07 (13)	1:18.08 (6)
11	Leeyen Harteveld	158.845	40.14 (11)	1:18.56 (9) PR	39.93 (10)	1:18.99 (11)
12	Esmé Stollenga	159.325	39.59 (8)	1:19.70 (13)	39.86 (9)	1:20.05 (12)
13	Helga Drost	160.970	40.50 (15)	1:20.52 (14)	39.99 (11)	1:20.44 (14)
14	Manouk van Tol	160.985	40.50 (15)	1:19.24 (11)	40.66 (17)	1:20.41 (13)
15	Danouk Bannink	161.520	40.21 (13)	1:21.28 (15)	40.08 (14)	1:21.018 (15)
16	Josien van der Wal	162.360	40.20 (12)	1:22.01 (17)	40.43 (16)	1:21.45 (16)
17	Naomi Weeland	163.140	40.55 (17)	1:22.62 (18)	40.37 (15)	1:21.82 (17)
18	Fabienne Winkel	164.305	40.88 (19)	1:21.85 (16)	40.88 (18)	1:23.24 (18)
19	Ariane Smit	165.775	41.34 (20)	1:2.65 (19)	41.45 (19)	1:23.32 (19)
NC	Dione Voskamp	40.730	40.73 (18)	DNS		
