= 2014 KNSB Dutch Single Distance Championships – Women's 1500 m =

- Venue: Thialf, Heerenveen, Netherlands
- Date: 25 October 2013
- Competitors: 24 skaters

Medalist men
1st place, gold medalist(s)		Jorien ter Mors	NED
2nd place, silver medalist(s)		Lotte van Beek	NED
3rd place, bronze medalist(s)		Ireen Wüst	NED

The women's 1500 meter at the 2014 KNSB Dutch Single Distance Championships took place in Heerenveen at the Thialf ice skating rink on Friday 25 October 2013. Although this tournament was held in 2013, it was part of the 2013–2014 speed skating season.

There were 24 participants.

Title holder was Ireen Wüst.

There was a qualification selection incentive for the next following 2013–14 ISU Speed Skating World Cup tournaments.

== Overview ==
=== Result ===
Rank	Skater	Time
1st place, gold medalist(s)	Jorien ter Mors	1:55.88 PR
2nd place, silver medalist(s)	Lotte van Beek	1:56.11 PR
3rd place, bronze medalist(s)	Ireen Wüst	1:56.37
4	Marrit Leenstra	1:56.83
5	Jorien Voorhuis	1:58.67
6	Annouk van der Weijden	1:58.71 PR
7	Margot Boer	1:58.81
8	Antoinette de Jong	1:58.87
9	Linda de Vries	1:58.97
10	Manon Kamminga	1:59.12 PR
11	Melissa Wijfje	1:59.32 PR
12	Irene Schouten	1:59.96 PR
13	Yvonne Nauta	2:00.08 PR
14	Roxanne van Hemert	2:00.10
15	Diane Valkenburg	2:00.11
16	Sanneke de Neeling	2:00.43 PR
17	Carlijn Achtereekte	2:00.59 PR
18	Natasja Bruintjes	2:00.94
19	Laurine van Riessen	2:01.33
20	Imke Vormeer	2:01.47 PR
21	Annette Gerritsen	2:01.79
22	Letitia de Jong	2:02.43
23	Mariska Huisman	2:02.88
24	Carla Ketellapper-Zielman	2:03.74

=== Draw ===
Heat	Inner lane	Outer lane
1	Sanneke de Neeling	Melissa Wijfje
2	Imke Vormeer	Letitia de Jong
3	Manon Kamminga	Carla Ketellapper-Zielman
4	Roxanne van Hemert	Annette Gerritsen
5	Jorien Voorhuis	Margot Boer
6	Natasja Bruintjes	Irene Schouten
7	Annouk van der Weijden	Yvonne Nauta
8	Carlijn Achtereekte	Mariska Huisman
9	Lotte van Beek	Linda de Vries
10	Marrit Leenstra	Jorien ter Mors
11	Antoinette de Jong	Diane Valkenburg
12	Ireen Wüst	Laurine van Riessen
