= 2011 KNSB Dutch Single Distance Championships =

KNSB Dutch Single Distance Championships
- Venue: Thialf, Heerenveen
- Dates: 5–7 November 2010

The 2011 KNSB Dutch Single Distance Championships were held at the Thialf ice stadium in Heerenveen from 5 November until 7 November 2010. Although the tournament was held in 2010 it was the 2011 edition as it is part of the 2010/2011 speed skating season.

== Schedule ==
Schedule
Date	Time	Distance
Friday; 5 November 2010	14:30	Men's 500 meter 1st run Women's 500 meter 1st run Men's 500 meter 2nd run Women's 500 meter 2nd run Men's 5000 meter
Saturday; 6 November 2010	14:15	Women's 1000 meter Men's 1000 meter Women's 3000 meter
Sunday; 7 November 2010	12:30	Women's 1500 meter Men's 1500 meter Women's 5000 meter Men's 10,000 meter

== Medalists ==
=== Men ===
Distance	Gold		Silver		Bronze	
2x500 m details	Ronald Mulder; APPM	70.230 (35.12/35.11)	Jan Smeekens; Control	70.310 (35.19/35.12)	Stefan Groothuis; Control	70.940 (35.38/35.56)
1000 m details	Simon Kuipers; TVM	1:08.87	Stefan Groothuis; Control	1:08.99	Jan Bos; Independent rider	1:09.66
1500 m details	Simon Kuipers; TVM	1:44.81	Mark Tuitert; Control	1:45.87	Stefan Groothuis; Control	1:46.31
5000 m details	Bob de Vries; BAM	6:22.29	Wouter olde Heuvel; TVM	6:22.74	Jorrit Bergsma; BAM	6:23.77
10,000 m details	Bob de Jong; BAM	12:59.95	Bob de Vries; BAM	13:08.13	Jorrit Bergsma; BAM	13:11.54

Source: SchaatsStatistieken.nl

=== Women ===
Distance	Gold		Silver		Bronze	
2x500 m details	Margot Boer; Team Liga	78.270 (38.72/38.55)	Laurine van Riessen; Control	78.330 (38.70/38.63)	Marrit Leenstra; Hofmeier	78.980 (39.50/39.48)
1000 m details	Marrit Leenstra; Hofmeier	1:16.84	Margot Boer; Team Liga	1:17.26	Laurine van Riessen; Control	1:17.28
1500 m details	Ireen Wüst; TVM	1:57.33	Marrit Leenstra; Hofmeier	1:57.39	Laurine van Riessen; Control	1:59.58
3000 m details	Ireen Wüst; TVM	4:12.32	Marrit Leenstra; Hofmeier	4:14.72	Marije Joling; Gewest Drenthe	4:15.41
5000 m details	Moniek Kleinsman; Gewest Overijssel	7:15.61	Carlijn Achtereekte; Gewest Overijssel	7:18.14	Marije Joling; Gewest Drenthe	7:19.49

Source: SchaatsStatistieken.nl
