= 2018 KNSB Dutch Sprint Championships =

Dutch speed skating competition

KNSB Dutch Sprint Championships
- Venue: Thialf, Heerenveen
- Dates: 27 January–28 January 2018
- Competitors: 22 men 20 women

Medalist men
1st place, gold medalist(s)		Dai Dai N'tab	NED
2nd place, silver medalist(s)		Hein Otterspeer	NED
3rd place, bronze medalist(s)		Thomas Krol	NED

Medalist women
1st place, gold medalist(s)		Letitia de Jong	NED
2nd place, silver medalist(s)		Anice Das	NED
3rd place, bronze medalist(s)		Sanneke de Neeling	NED

The 2018 KNSB Dutch Sprint Championships in speed skating were held in Heerenveen at the Thialf ice skating rink from 27 January to 28 January 2018. The tournament was part of the 2017–2018 speed skating season. Dai Dai N'tab and Letitia de Jong won the sprint titles. The sprint championships were held at the same time as the 2018 KNSB Dutch Allround Championships.

== Schedule ==
Saturday 27 January 2018	Sunday 28 January 2018
500 meter women sprint 1st run 500 meter men sprint 1st run 1000 meter women sprint 1st run 1000 meter men sprint 1st run	500 meter women sprint 2nd run 500 meter men sprint 2nd run 1000 meter women sprint 2nd run 1000 meter men sprint 2nd run

== Medalist ==
Event	Gold		Silver		Bronze	
Women's Sprint overall	Letitia de Jong	153.585	Anice Das	155.055	Sanneke de Neeling	155.435
Men's Sprint overall	Dai Dai N'tab	139.415	Hein Otterspeer	139.500	Thomas Krol	139.665

=== Men's sprint ===
Event	1st place, gold medalist(s)	2nd place, silver medalist(s)	3rd place, bronze medalist(s)
Classification	Dai Dai N'tab	Hein Otterspeer	Thomas Krol
500 meter (1st)	Dai Dai N'tab	Michel Mulder	Hein Otterspeer
1000 meter (1st)	Thomas Krol	Hein Otterspeer	Lucas van Alphen
500 meter (2nd)	Michel Mulder	Dai Dai N'tab	Hein Otterspeer
1000 meter (2nd)	Thomas Krol	Hein Otterspeer	Michel Mulder

=== Women's sprint ===
Event	1st place, gold medalist(s)	2nd place, silver medalist(s)	3rd place, bronze medalist(s)
Classification	Letitia de Jong	Anice Das	Sanneke de Neeling
500 meter (1st)	Anice Das	Letitia de Jong	Floor van den Brandt
1000 meter (1st)	Letitia de Jong	Anice Das	Lotte van Beek
500 meter (2nd)	Letitia de Jong	Sanneke de Neeling	Floor van den Brandt
1000 meter (2nd)	Letitia de Jong	Sanneke de Neeling	Anice Das

== Classification ==
=== Men's sprint ===
Position	Skater	Total points Samalog	500m	1000m	500m	1000m
1st place, gold medalist(s)	Dai Dai N'tab	139.415	34.87 (1)	1:09.72 (4)	34.85 (2)	1:09.67 (4)
2nd place, silver medalist(s)	Hein Otterspeer	139.500	35.30 (3)	1:08.91 (2)	35.24 (3)	1:09.01 (2)
3rd place, bronze medalist(s)	Thomas Krol	139.665 PR	35.55 (6)	1:08.52 (1)	35.36 (5) PR	1:08.99 (1)
4	Michel Mulder	139.805	35.08 (2)	1:10.35 (6)	34.74 (1)	1:09.62 (3)
5	Pim Schipper	141.410	35.79 (10)	1:10.07 (5)	35.62 (8)	1:09.93 (7)
6	Lennart Velema	141.450	35.56 (7)	1:10.59 (8)	35.67 (10)	1:09.85 (6)
7	Aron Romeijn	141.865	35.70 (8)	1:10.77 (10)	35.55 (6)	1:10.46 (8)
8	Wesly Dijs	142.080	36.03 (11) PR	1:10.44 (7)	35.98 (12) PR	1:09.70 (5) PR
9	Lucas van Alphen	142.635	35.34 (4) PR	1:09.27 (3)	35.26 (4) PR	1:14.80 (20)
10	Jesper Hospes	142.720	35.74 (9)	1:11.61 (12)	35.61 (7)	1:11.13 (10)
11	Gijs Esders	143.125	36.20 (14)	1:11.61 (12)	35.70 (11) PR	1:10.84 (9)
12	Niek Deelstra	144.135	36.11 (12)	1:12.35 (16)	36.15 (13)	1:11.40 (12)
13	Thijs Govers	144.255	36.18 (13)	1:11.97 (15)	36.35 (15)	1:11.48 (13)
14	Tom Kant	144.375	36.66 (19)	1:11.49 (11)	36.36 (17) PR	1:11.22 (11)
15	Joost Born	144.705	36.35 (16)	1:11.94 (14)	36.36 (17)	1:12.05 (15)
16	Mark Nomden	145.100 PR	36.46 (17)	1:12.54 (18)	36.33 (14)	1:12.08 (16)
16	Frerik Scheffer	145.100 PR	36.48 (18)	1:12.46 (17)	36.46 (19) PR	1:11.86 (14)
18	Joost van Dobbenburgh	145.200	36.22 (15) PR	1:12.90 (20)	36.35 (15)	1:12.36 (18)
19	Joep Kalverdijk	145.835	36.78 (20)	1:12.75 (19)	36.57 (20)	1:12.22 (17)
20	Thijmen Polman	148.955 PR	37.34 (21)	1:14.12 (21)	37.49 (21)	1:14.13 (19)
NC	Martijn van Oosten	106.350	35.38 (5)	1:10.70 (9)	35.62 (8)	DQ
NC	Wessel Schilders	75.160	37.70 (22)	1:14.92 (22)	WDR	

=== Women's sprint ===
Position	Skater	Total points Samalog	500m	1000m	500m	1000m
1st place, gold medalist(s)	Letitia de Jong	153.585	38.78 (2)	1:16.15 (1)	38.62 (1)	1:16.22 (1)
2nd place, silver medalist(s)	Anice Das	155.055	38.76 (1)	1:17.16 (2)	39.14 (5)	1:17.15 (3)
3rd place, bronze medalist(s)	Sanneke de Neeling	155.435	39.17 (4)	1:17.79 (5)	38.95 (2)	1:16.84 (2)
4	Lotte van Beek	156.790	39.85 (10)	1:17.23 (3)	39.45 (6)	1:17.75 (5)
5	Roxanne van Hemert	156.985	39.66 (8)	1:17.70 (4)	39.69 (8)	1:17.57 (4)
6	Floor van den Brandt	157.435	39.07 (3)	1:19.54 (10)	38.98 (3)	1:19.23 (7)
7	Manouk van Tol	157.710	39.77 (9)	1:18.35 (7)	39.66 (7) PR	1:18.21 (6)
8	Dione Voskamp	158.000	39.37 (5)	1:19.47 (8)	39.00 (4) PR	1:19.79 (9)
9	Helga Drost	159.875	40.01 (13)	1:20.05 (12)	39.72 (9)	1:20.18 (10)
10	Tessa Boogaard	159.930	40.14 (14)	1:20.07 (13)	40.02 (13)	1:19.47 (8)
11	Anouk Karel	160.370 PR	39.85 (10)	1:20.77 (16)	39.74 (10) PR	1:20.79 (14)
12	Leeyen Harteveld	160.585	40.23 (17)	1:19.86 (11)	40.32 (15)	1:20.21 (11)
13	Rachelle van de Griek	160.655	40.22 (16)	1:20.46 (14)	39.98 (12)	1:20.47 (13)
14	Danouk Bannink	161.115	40.19 (15)	1:21.36 (17)	40.12 (14)	1:20.25 (12)
15	Anouk Sanders	162.780	40.78 (19) PR	1:20.72 (15) PR	41.05 (18)	1:21.18 (15)
16	Naomi Weeland	163.465	40.41 (18)	1:23.04 (19)	40.47 (16)	1:22.13 (16)
17	Nienke Kleinsman	164.435 PR	40.96 (20)	1:22.80 (18)	40.64 (17)	1:22.87 (17)
NC	Isabelle van Elst	119.500	39.93 (12)	1:19.50 (9)	39.82 (11)	WDR
NC	Sanne van der Schaar	78.365	39.45 (6)	1:17.83 (6)	DNF	
NC	Ireen Wüst	39.560	39.56 (7)	WDR		
