= 2010 KNSB Dutch Single Distance Championships – Women's 1000 m =

- Venue: Thialf, Heerenveen, Netherlands
- Date: 31 October 2009
- Competitors: 22 skaters

Medalist men
1st place, gold medalist(s)		Annette Gerritsen	NED
2nd place, silver medalist(s)		Margot Boer	NED
3rd place, bronze medalist(s)		Marianne Timmer	NED

The women's 1000 meter at the 2010 KNSB Dutch Single Distance Championships took place in Heerenveen at the Thialf ice skating rink on Saturday 31 October 2009. Although this tournament was held in 2009, it was part of the speed skating season 2009–2010.

There were 22 participants.

Title holder was Paulien van Deutekom.

== Statistics ==
=== Result ===
Rank	Skater	Time
1st place, gold medalist(s)	Annette Gerritsen	1:16.83
2nd place, silver medalist(s)	Margot Boer	1:17.18
3rd place, bronze medalist(s)	Marianne Timmer	1:17.26
4	Laurine van Riessen	1:17.41
5	Ireen Wüst	1:17.61(2)
6	Natasja Bruintjes	1:17.61(8)
7	Lotte van Beek	1:18.17 PR
8	Ingeborg Kroon	1:18.30
9	Thijsje Oenema	1:18.89
10	Roxanne van Hemert	1:19.06
11	Janine Smit	1:19.24 PR
12	Linda de Vries	1:19.33 PR
13	Paulien van Deutekom	1:19.34
14	Frederika Buwalda	1:19.64(6)
15	Marrit Leenstra	1:19.64(9)
16	Jorien Kranenborg	1:19.89
17	Brecht Kramer	1:20.06
18	Tosca Hilbrands	1:20.07
19	Elma de Vries	1:20.13
20	Marit Dekker	1:20.25
21	Anice Das	1:20.58
22	Rosa Pater	1:21.81 PR

=== Draw ===
Heat	Inner lane	Outer lane
1	Jorien Kranenborg	Rosa Pater
2	Janine Smit	Elma de Vries
3	Brecht Kramer	Linda de Vries
4	Thijsje Oenema	Marit Dekker
5	Lotte van Beek	Ingeborg Kroon
6	Tosca Hilbrands	Marianne Timmer
7	Frederika Buwalda	Anice Das
8	Annette Gerritsen	Laurine van Riessen
9	Ireen Wüst	Marrit Leenstra
10	Natasja Bruintjes	Roxanne van Hemert
11	Margot Boer	Paulien van Deutekom
