= 2013 KNSB Dutch Single Distance Championships – Women's 1500 m =

- Venue: Thialf, Heerenveen, Netherlands
- Date: 9 November 2012
- Competitors: 24 skaters

Medalist men
1st place, gold medalist(s)		Ireen Wüst	NED
2nd place, silver medalist(s)		Lotte van Beek	NED
3rd place, bronze medalist(s)		Marrit Leenstra	NED

The women's 1500 meter at the 2013 KNSB Dutch Single Distance Championships took place in Heerenveen at the Thialf ice skating rink on Friday 9 November 2012. Although this tournament was held in 2012, it was part of the 2012–2013 speed skating season.

There were 24 participants.

Title holder was Ireen Wüst.

There was a qualification selection incentive for the next following 2012–13 ISU Speed Skating World Cup tournaments.

== Overview ==
=== Result ===
Rank	Skater	Time
1st place, gold medalist(s)	Ireen Wüst	1:57.11
2nd place, silver medalist(s)	Lotte van Beek	1:57.46 PR
3rd place, bronze medalist(s)	Marrit Leenstra	1:58.33
4	Marije Joling	1:58.68 PR
5	Linda de Vries	1:59.08
6	Laurine van Riessen	1:59.13
7	Antoinette de Jong	1:59.36 PR
8	Irene Schouten	2:01.22 PR
9	Annouk van der Weijden	2:01.33
10	Janneke Ensing	2:01.61
11	Reina Anema	2:01.82 PR
12	Jorien Voorhuis	2:01.95
13	Carla Zielman	2:01.98 PR
14	Annette Gerritsen	2:02.00
15	Letitia de Jong	2:02.31 PR
16	Marit Dekker	2:02.35
17	Mariska Huisman	2:02.70
18	Yvonne Nauta	2:02.84
19	Manon Kamminga	2:02.89 PR
20	Roxanne van Hemert	2:03.76
21	Miranda Dekker	2:04.48
22	Elma de Vries	2:04.75
23	Rianne Hadders	2:05.23 PR
–	Diane Valkenburg	DQ

=== Draw ===
Heat	Inner lane	Outer lane
1	Elma de Vries	Rianne Hadders
2	Mariska Huisman	Miranda Dekker
3	Manon Kamminga	Marit Dekker
4	Irene Schouten	Letitia de Jong
5	Yvonne Nauta	Carla Zielman
6	Lotte van Beek	Laurine van Riessen
7	Reina Anema	Annette Gerritsen
8	Roxanne van Hemert	Janneke Ensing
9	Linda de Vries	Jorien Voorhuis
10	Ireen Wüst	Annouk van der Weijden
11	Diane Valkenburg	Marrit Leenstra
12	Antoinette de Jong	Marije Joling
