= 2019 KNSB Dutch Sprint Championships =

Dutch speed skating competition

KNSB Dutch Sprint Championships
- Venue: Thialf, Heerenveen
- Dates: 26 January–27 January 2019
- Competitors: 20 men 20 women

Medalist men
1st place, gold medalist(s)		Hein Otterspeer	NED
2nd place, silver medalist(s)		Dai Dai N'tab	NED
3rd place, bronze medalist(s)		Lennart Velema	NED

Medalist women
1st place, gold medalist(s)		Jutta Leerdam	NED
2nd place, silver medalist(s)		Letitia de Jong	NED
3rd place, bronze medalist(s)		Sanneke de Neeling	NED

The 2019 KNSB Dutch Sprint Championships in speed skating were held in Heerenveen at the Thialf ice skating rink from 26 January to 27 January 2019. The tournament was part of the 2018–2019 speed skating season. Hein Otterspeer and Jutta Leerdam won the sprint titles. The sprint championships were held at the same time as the 2019 KNSB Dutch Allround Championships.

== Schedule ==
Saturday 26 January 2019	Sunday 27 January 2019
500 meter women sprint 1st run 500 meter men sprint 1st run 1000 meter women sprint 1st run 1000 meter men sprint 1st run	500 meter women sprint 2nd run 500 meter men sprint 2nd run 1000 meter women sprint 2nd run 1000 meter men sprint 2nd run

== Medalist ==
Event	Gold		Silver		Bronze	
Women's Sprint overall	Jutta Leerdam	150.070	Letitia de Jong	150.930	Sanneke de Neeling	152.710
Men's Sprint overall	Hein Otterspeer	137.93	Dai Dai N'tab	138.750	Lennart Velema	138.055

=== Men's sprint ===
Event	1st place, gold medalist(s)	2nd place, silver medalist(s)	3rd place, bronze medalist(s)	
Classification	Hein Otterspeer	Dai Dai N'tab	Lennart Velema	data
500 meter (1st)	Dai Dai N'tab	Michel Mulder; Jan Smeekens		data
1000 meter (1st)	Hein Otterspeer	Lennart Velema	Gijs Esders	data
500 meter (2nd)	Michel Mulder	Dai Dai N'tab	Hein Otterspeer	data
1000 meter (2nd)	Hein Otterspeer	Lennart Velema	Pim Schipper	data

=== Women's sprint ===
Event	1st place, gold medalist(s)	2nd place, silver medalist(s)	3rd place, bronze medalist(s)	
Classification	Jutta Leerdam	Letitia de Jong	Sanneke de Neeling	data
500 meter (1st)	Jutta Leerdam	Letitia de Jong	Janine Smit; Dione Voskamp	data
1000 meter (1st)	Jutta Leerdam	Letitia de Jong	Lotte van Beek	data
500 meter (2nd)	Letitia de Jong	Jutta Leerdam	Sanneke de Neeling	data
1000 meter (2nd)	Jutta Leerdam	Letitia de Jong	Sanneke de Neeling	data

== Classification ==
=== Men's sprint ===
Position	Skater	Total points Samalog	500m	1000m	500m	1000m
1st place, gold medalist(s)	Hein Otterspeer	137.935 TR	35.06 (6)	1:08.05 (1)	34.74 (3)	1:08.22 (1)
2nd place, silver medalist(s)	Dai Dai N'tab	138.750 PR	34.67 (1)	1:09.35 (5)	34.65 (2)	1:09.51 (6)
3rd place, bronze medalist(s)	Lennart Velema	139.055 PR	35.07 (7) PR	1:08.89 (2) PR	35.24 (6)	1:08.60 (2) PR
4	Pim Schipper	139.215 PR	35.15 (8)	1:09.33 (4)	34.96 (4) PR	1:08.88 (3)
5	Michel Mulder	139.265	34.92 (2)	1:10.11 (9)	34.62 (1)	1:09.34 (5)
6	Gijs Esders	139.360 PR	34.99 (4) PR	1:09.19 (3)	35.26 (7)	1:09.03 (4) PR
7	Jesper Hospes	140.440 PR	34.99 (4)	1:10.78 (14)	35.08 (5)	1:09.96 (9)
8	Martijn van Oosten	140.965 PR	35.60 (12)	1:10.08 (8)	35.40 (8)	1:09.85 (8)
9	Aron Romeijn	141.170 PR	35.41 (10)	1:10.18 (10)	35.43 (9)	1:10.48 (12)
10	Wesly Dijs	141.715 PR	35.93 (15) PR	1:09.98 (7)	36.04 (15)	1:09.51 (6) PR
11	Tom Kant	141.790 PR	35.86 (14)	1:10.48 (11) PR	35.64 (11) PR	1:10.10 (10) PR
12	Joost Born	141.800 PR	35.53 (11) PR	1:10.59 (12)	35.56 (10)	1:10.83 (15)
13	Niek Deelstra	142.300 PR	35.71 (13)	1:11.05 (16)	35.87 (12)	1:10.39 (11)
14	Joost van Dobbenburgh	142.585 PR	36.04 (17) PR	1:10.78 (14) PR	35.90 (13) PR	1:10.51 (13) PR
15	Thijs Govers	142.995 PR	35.99 (16)	1:10.76 (13)	36.01 (14)	1:11.23 (16)
16	Joep Kalverdijk	144.510 PR	36.78 (20)	1:12.14 (18)	36.37 (16)	1:10.58 (14) PR
17	Hille Drenth	144.665 PR	36.24 (18) PR	1:12.22 (19) PR	36.48 (17)	1:11.67 (18) PR
18	Olaf Gerritsen	145.255 PR	36.59 (19) PR	1:12.41 (20) PR	36.63 (18)	1:11.66 (17) PR
NC	Gerben Jorritsma	69.935	35.15 (8)	1:09.57 (6)	DQ	
NC	Jan Smeekens	70.590	34.92 (2)	1:11.34 (17)	WDR	

=== Women's sprint ===
Position	Skater	Total points Samalog	500m	1000m	500m	1000m
1st place, gold medalist(s)	Jutta Leerdam	150.070 PR/BR	38.01 (1) PR	1:14.47 (1)	37.83 (2) PR	1:13.99 (1) PR
2nd place, silver medalist(s)	Letitia de Jong	150.930	38.18 (2)	1:14.89 (2)	37.79 (1) PR	1:15.03 (2)
3rd place, bronze medalist(s)	Sanneke de Neeling	152.710	38.75 (5)	1:16.21 (6)	38.16 (3) PR	1:15.39 (3)
4	Janine Smit	153.000 PR	38.42 (3) PR	1:16.75 (7)	38.22 (4) PR	1:15.97 (6) PR
5	Lotte van Beek	153.635 PR	39.14 (9)	1:15.49 (3)	38.98 (12)	1:15.54 (4)
6	Sanne van der Schaar	153.995 PR	39.26 (11)	1:16.12 (4) PR	38.65 (5) PR	1:15.97 (6) PR
7	Isabelle van Elst	154.065 PR	38.75 (5)	1:16.84 (8) PR	38.67 (6) PR	1:16.45 (8) PR
8	Elisa Dul	154.405	39.45 (14)	1:16.16 (5)	38.96 (11)	1:15.83 (5)
9	Esmé Stollenga	155.115 PR	39.46 (15)	1:17.10 (10) PR	38.84 (8)	1:16.53 (9) PR
10	Dione Voskamp	155.165	38.42 (3)	1:17.57 (14)	38.95 (9)	1:18.02 (15)
11	Lina Miedema	155.660 PR	38.91 (7) PR	1:17.56 (13) PR	38.695 (9)	1:18.04 (16)
12	Bo van der Werff	155.785 PR	39.33 (12)	1:17.41 (12)	39.28 (15)	1:16.94 (12) PR
13	Manouk van Tol	155.865 PR	39.44 (13)	1:17.59 (15)	39.19 (13)	1:16.88 (10)
14	Tessa Boogaard	155.915 PR	39.19 (10) PR	1:17.94 (16)	38.78 (7) PR	1:17.95 (14)
15	Roxanne van Hemert	155.925 PR	39.52 (16)	1:17.38 (11)	39.25 (14)	1:16.93 (11)
16	Helga Drost	158.125	39.61 (17)	1:19.57 (19)	39.50 (17)	1:18.46 (17)
17	Danouk Bannink	159.275 PR	39.81 (18)	1:20.61 (20)	39.43 (16)	1:19.46 (19) PR
18	Anouk Sanders	159.560 PR	40.27 (19)	1:19.32 (18) PR	40.12 (19) PR	1:19.02 (18) PR
19	Leeyen Harteveld	163.135	45.32 (20)	1:18.25 (17) PR	39.90 (18)	1:17.58 (13) PR
NC	Anice Das	77.460	39.01 (8)	1:16.90 (9)	DQ	
