= Letitia de Jong =

Dutch speed skater

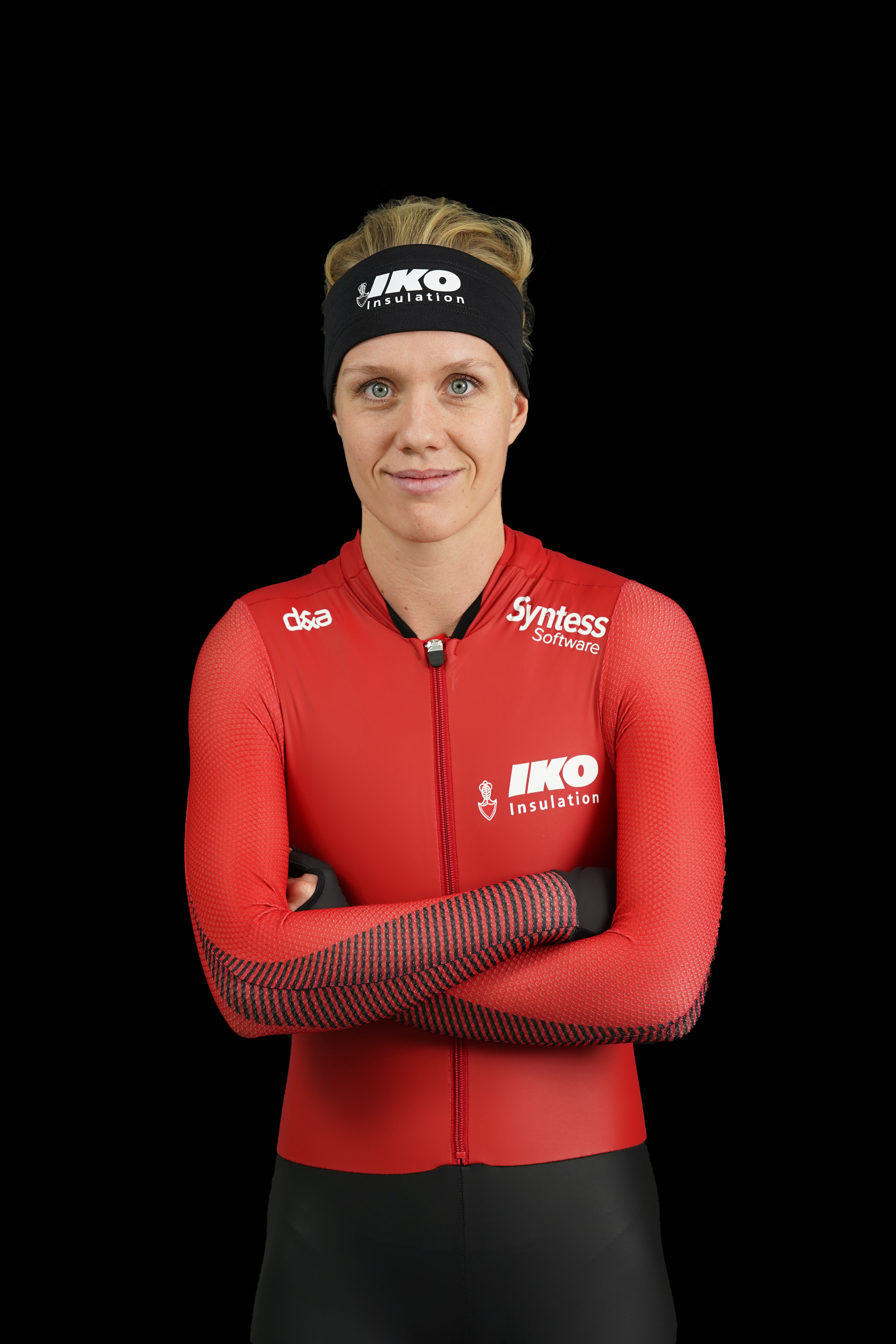
- De Jong in 2020

Personal information
- Nationality: Dutch
- Born: 5 March 1993 (age 33) Feanwâlden, Netherlands
- Height: 1.71 m (5 ft 7 in)
- Weight: 61 kg (134 lb)

Sport
- Country: Netherlands
- Sport: Speed skating
- Event: Sprint
- Club: Team IKO
- Turned pro: 2011
Medal record
World Single Distance Championships
Gold medal – first place	2019 Inzell	Team sprint
Gold medal – first place	2020 Salt Lake City	Team sprint
European Championships
Silver medal – second place	2018 Kolomma	Team sprint
Silver medal – second place	2020 Heerenven	Team sprint
Dutch Sprint Championships
Gold medal – first place	2018 Heerenveen	Sprint

Letitia de Jong (born 5 March 1993) is a Dutch former speed skater who specialized in the sprint distances.

== Career ==
In January 2018 she won the silver medal at the team sprint event of the 2018 European Championships in Kolomna, Russia, partnering Mayon Kuipers and Sanneke de Neeling. That same month she won the national title at the KNSB Dutch Sprint Championships. This result qualified her for the 2018 World Sprint Speed Skating Championships in Changchun, China, in March where she finished eighth.

De Jong was a member of Team IKO.

== Records ==
=== Personal records ===
Personal records
Speed skating
Event	Result	Date	Location	Notes
500 m	37.19	14 February 2020	Utah Olympic Oval, Salt Lake City	
1000 m	1:12.99	15 February 2020	Utah Olympic Oval, Salt Lake City	
1500 m	1:57.00	20 October 2018	Max Aicher Arena, Inzell	
3000 m	4:25.92	27 February 2010	Thialf, Heerenveen	

=== World records ===
Nr.	Event	Result	Date	Location	Notes
1.	Team sprint	1:24.02	13 February 2020	Utah Olympic Oval, Salt Lake City	Together with Jutta Leerdam and Femke Kok

== Tournament overview ==
Season	Dutch Championships Single Distances	Dutch Championships Sprint	European Championships Sprint	European Championships Single Distances	World Championships Sprint	World Cup GWC	World Championships Single Distances	World Championships Junior
2010–11		HEERENVEEN 16th 500m 12th 1000m 18th 500m 13th 1000m 15th overall						SEINÄJOKI 6th 500m 12th 1000m 17th 1500m DQ team pursuit
2011–12	HEERENVEEN 19th 500m 13th 1000m	HEERENVEEN 17th 500m 14th 1000m 14th 500m 13th 1000m 15th overall						OBIHIRO 10th 500m 13th 1000m
2012–13	HEERENVEEN 15th 500m 16th 1000m 15th 1500m	GRONINGEN 16th 500m 11th 1000m 17th 500m DNQ 1000m NC overall						
2013–14	HEERENVEEN 15th 500m 12th 1000m 22nd 1500m	AMSTERDAM 10th 500m 7th 1000m 16th 500m 5th 1000m 7th overall						
2014–15	HEERENVEEN 10th 500m 6th 1000m 13th 1500m	HEERENVEEN 10th 500m 9th 1000m 11th 500m 7th 1000m 9th overall				37th 1000m		
2015–16	HEERENVEEN 11th 500m 12th 1000m	HEERENVEEN 18th 500m 12th 1000m 13th 500m 9th 1000m 12th overall				38th 500m		
2016–17	HEERENVEEN 9th 500m 6th 1000m	HEERENVEEN 6th 500m 8th 1000m 7th 500m (silver) 1000m 5th overall				34th 1000m		
2017–18	HEERENVEEN 4th 500m 13th 1000m 12th 1500m	HEERENVEEN (silver) 500m (gold) 1000m (gold) 500m (gold) 1000m (gold) overall		KOLOMNA 6th 500m 5th 1000m (silver) team sprint	CHANGCHUN 11th 500m 6th 1000m 11th 500m 7th 1000m 8th overall	9th 500m 18th 1000m		
2018–19	HEERENVEEN (silver) 500m 5th 1000m	HEERENVEEN (silver) 500m (silver) 1000m (gold) 500m (silver) 1000m (silver) overall	COLLALBO 5th 500m (bronze) 1000m 6th 500m 6th 1000m 6th overall		HEERENVEEN 14th 500m 13th 1000m 9th 500m 10th 1000m 13th overall	17th 500m 10th 1000m	INZELL 13th 500m (gold) team sprint	
2019–20	HEERENVEEN (silver) 500m (silver) 1000m	HEERENVEEN (gold) 500m (gold) 1000m (silver) 500m (gold) 1000m (gold) overall		HEERENVEEN 6th 500m 4th 1000m (silver) team sprint	HAMAR 11th 500m 4th 1000m 10th 500m 7th 1000m 8th overall	33rd 500m 8th 1000m (gold) team sprint	SALT LAKE CITY 6th 500m 9th 1000m (gold) team sprint	
2020–21		HEERENVEEN 19th 500m 17th 1000m DNS 500m DNQ 1000m NC overall						

== World Cup overview ==
Season	500 meter											
2014–15												
2015–16	–	–	–	–	–	3rd(b)	–	–	–	–	–	–
2016–17												
2017–18	16th	19th	19th	17th	3rd(b)	–	–	9th	6th	5th	7th	
2018–19	15th	20th	3rd(b)	12th	3rd(b)	15th	1st(b)	10th	–	–	–	
2019–20	2nd(b)	–	–	–	–	1st(b)						

Season	1000 meter						
2014–15	–	–	2nd(b)	–	–	–	–
2015–16							
2016–17	–	–	–	–	–	1st(b)	–
2017–18	–	–	2nd(b)	–	7th	–	8th
2018–19	9th	12th	11th	9th	14th	7th	
2019–20	5th	7th	–	8th	4th		

Season	Team sprint			
2014–15				
2015–16				
2016–17				
2017–18				
2018–19				
2019–20	1st place, gold medalist(s)	–	1st place, gold medalist(s)	–

- DQ = Disqualified
- – = Did not participate
- (b) = Division B
- GWC = Grand World Cup
