= 2015 KNSB Dutch Single Distance Championships – Women's 1500 m =

Speed skating tournament

- Venue: Thialf, Heerenveen, Netherlands
- Date: 31 October 2014
- Competitors: 24 skaters

Medalist men
1st place, gold medalist(s)		Ireen Wüst	NED
2nd place, silver medalist(s)		Marrit Leenstra	NED
3rd place, bronze medalist(s)		Antoinette de Jong	NED

The women's 1500 meter at the 2015 KNSB Dutch Single Distance Championships took place in Heerenveen at the Thialf ice skating rink on Friday 31 October 2014. Although this tournament was held in 2014, it was part of the 2014–2015 speed skating season.

There were 24 participants.

Title holder was Jorien ter Mors.

== Result ==
Rank	Skater	Time
1st place, gold medalist(s)	Ireen Wüst	1:55.43
2nd place, silver medalist(s)	Marrit Leenstra	1:57.27
3rd place, bronze medalist(s)	Antoinette de Jong	1:57.54
4	Marije Joling	1:57.62
5	Linda de Vries	1:58.32
6	Melissa Wijfje	1:58.70
7	Sanneke de Neeling	1:59.17 PR
8	Jorien Voorhuis	1:59.36
9	Roxanne van Hemert	1:59.62 PR
10	Irene Schouten	1:59.65
11	Manon Kamminga	1:59.72
12	Diane Valkenburg	1:59.75
13	Letitia de Jong	2:00.38 PR
14	Yvonne Nauta	2:00.52
15	Margot Boer	2:01.34
16	Mariska Huisman	2:01.36
17	Reina Anema	2:01.67
18	Jade van der Molen	2:02.325 PR
18	Miranda Dekker	2:02.325
20	Sanne van der Schaar	2:03.93 PR
21	Paulien Westerhof	2:04.70 PR
22	Natasja Roest	2:04.99 PR
23	Leeyen Harteveld	2:06.46
–	Carlijn Achtereekte	DQ

DQ = Disqualified
