= Anice Das =

Dutch speed skater

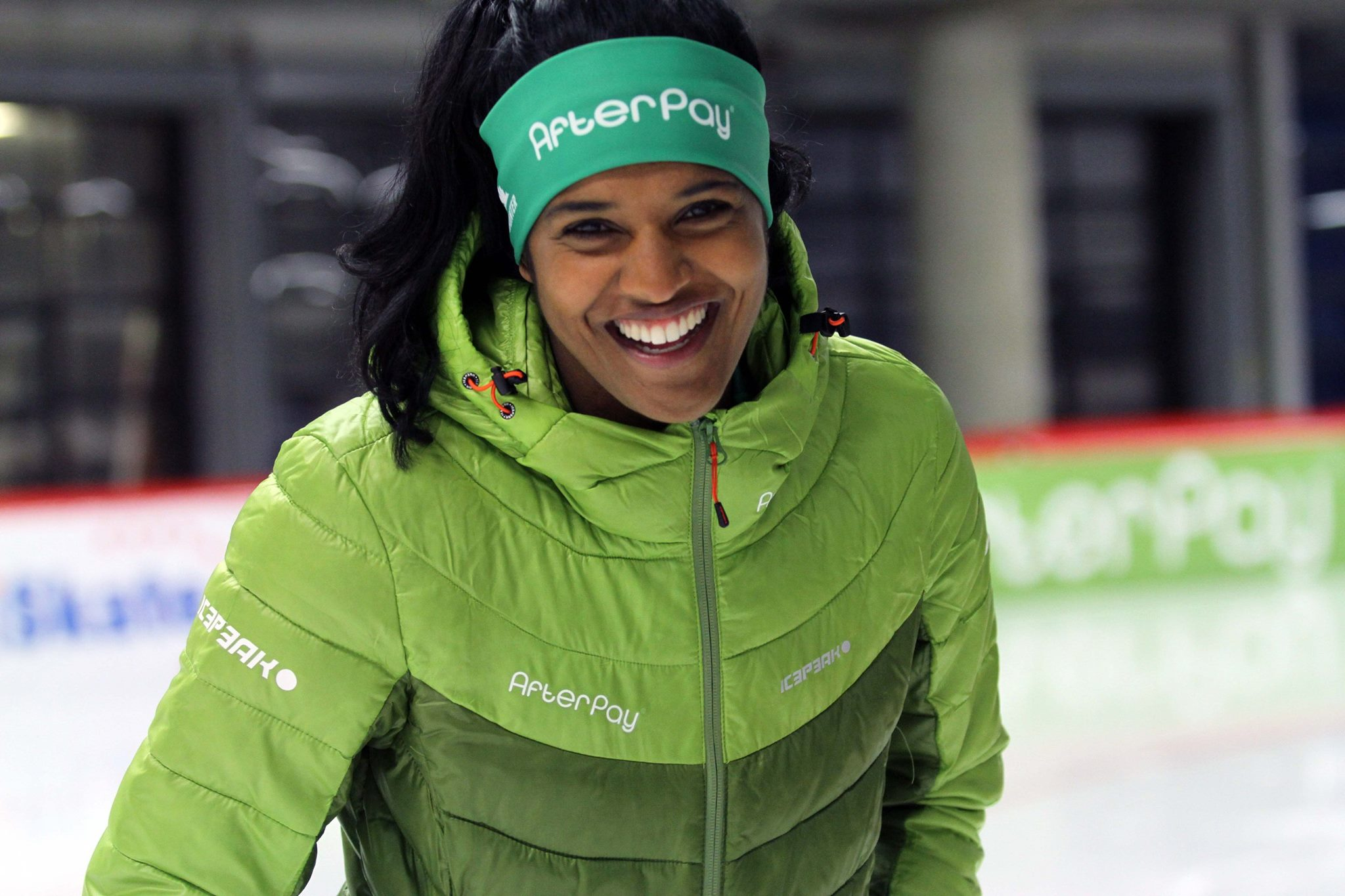
- Anice Das in Inzell, Bavaria, Germany

Personal information
- Born: Anice Asha Farzana Das; 31 December 1985 (age 40) Mumbai, India
- Height: 1.70 m (5 ft 7 in)
- Weight: 65 kg (143 lb)
- Website: www.anicedas.nl

Sport
- Country: Netherlands
- Sport: Speed skating

Achievements and titles
- Personal best(s): 500 m: 37.84 (2013); 1000 m: 1:15.11 (2017); 1500 m: 2:00.06 (2008); 3000 m: 4:23:61 (2008)
Medal record
Women's speed skating
Representing the Netherlands
Event	1st	2nd	3rd
Dutch single distance	0	0	1
Dutch sprint	0	2	0
Total	0	2	1

Anice Asha Farzana Das (born 31 December 1985 in Mumbai) is a retired Dutch speed skater, specialized in sprint distances.

== Professional career ==
Das made her first appearance at the Dutch single distance championships on 30 December 2005, aged 19. Since then she competed in nearly all Dutch single distance championships and Dutch sprint championships. She has achieved a slow but steady progress in her results, with her best results occurring at the 2017 Dutch championships (3rd place in 500m single distance, 2nd place overall in sprint). In February 2017, she competed at the world single distance championships for the first time. That same month, she competed at the world sprint championships for a second time. She was plagued by illness, including fever, in the week leading up to the event. She did manage to improve her personal best on 1000 meters in both races, finishing 18th overall.

On 28 December 2017, Das won the 500 meter event at the Dutch qualification tournament for the 2018 Olympic Games, beating all expected favorites. On 18 February 2018, she ended in 19th place at the Olympic 500 meter event, after skating in the first run without having an opponent in the other lane.

On 17 March 2020, Das announced her retirement from professional speed skating.

== Personal life ==
Das was born in Mumbai, India and was adopted by a Dutch family as an infant, along with her twin sister.

== Personal records ==
Distance	Time	Date	Track
500 meters	37,84	15 November 2013	Salt Lake City
1000 meters	1.15,11	26 February 2017	Calgary
1500 meters	2.00,06	12 March 2008	Calgary
3000 meters	4.23,61	13 March 2008	Calgary

== Results ==
Season	Dutch Championships Single Distances	Dutch Championships Allround	Dutch Championships Sprint	World Championships Single Distances	Olympic Games	World Championships Sprint	World Cup
2005–06	21st 1000m						
2007–08	19th 500m		19th 500m 19th 1000m 17th 500m 17th 1000m 18th overall				
2008–09	9th 500m 15th 1000m		11th 500m 10th 1000m 7th 500m 6th 1000m 6th overall				
2009–10	14th 500m 21st 1000m	(bronze) 500m 20th 3000m 9th 1500m DNS 5000m NC13 overall	13th 500m 12th 1000m DSQ 500m DNS 1000m DSQ overall				
2010–11	4th 500m 13th 1000m 12th 1500m		7th 500m 7th 1000m 10th 500m 10th 1000m 8th overall				31st 500m
2011–12	5th 500m 8th 1000m		6th 500m 9th 1000m 5th 500m 12th 1000m 7th overall				34th 500m
2012–13	4th 500m 5th 1000m		5th 500m 8th 1000m 5th 500m 8th 1000m 7th overall				21st 500m 33rd 1000m
2013–14	5th 500m 13th 1000m		4th 500m 10th 1000m 12th 500m WDR 1000m NC overall			NAGANO 10th 500m 9th 1000m 17th 500m 10th 1000m 11th overall	15th 500m 41st 1000m
2014–15	5th 500m 17th 1000m		6th 500m 13th 1000m 8th 500m 15th 1000m 10th overall				20th 500m
2015–16	6th 500m 6th 1000m		5th 500m 7th 1000m 5th 500m 4th 1000m 4th overall				35th 500m 28th 1000m
2016–17	(bronze) 500m 11th 1000m		(bronze) 500m (bronze) 1000m (silver) 500m (bronze) 1000m (silver) overall	GANGNEUNG 22nd 500m		CALGARY 20th 500m 20th 1000m 15th 500m 16th 1000m 18th Overall	18th 500m 26th 1000m (silver) Team sprint
2017–18	10th 500m 9th 1000m		(gold) 500m (silver) 1000m 5th 500m (bronze) 1000m (silver) overall		GANGNEUNG 19th 500m		32nd 500m 40th 1000m
2018–19	10th 500m		8th 500m 9th 1000m DQ 500m DNS 1000m DQ overall				
2019–20	8th 500m 11th 1000m		8th 500m 5th 1000m 7th 500m 4th 1000m 5th overall				
