= Margot Boer =

Dutch speed skater

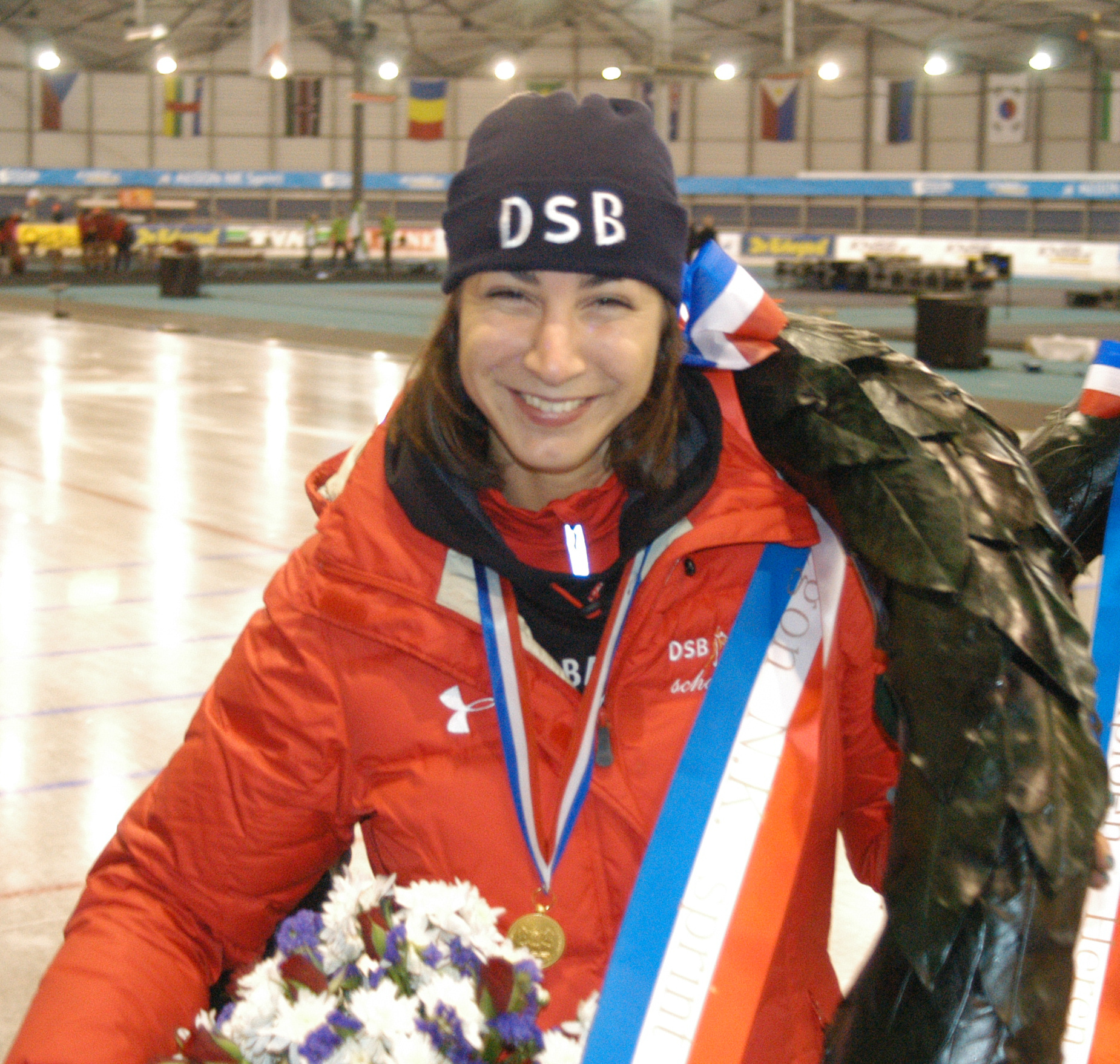
- Boer in 2009

Personal information
- Born: 7 August 1985 (age 41) Woubrugge, Netherlands
- Height: 1.80 m (5 ft 11 in)
- Weight: 70 kg (154 lb)

Sport
- Country: Netherlands
- Sport: Speed skating
- Turned pro: 2006
- Retired: 2016
Medal record
Women's speed skating
Representing the Netherlands
Olympic Games
Bronze medal – third place	2014 Sochi	500 m
Bronze medal – third place	2014 Sochi	1000 m
World Single Distance Championships
Bronze medal – third place	2009 Vancouver	1000 m
Bronze medal – third place	2012 Heerenveen	1000 m
World Sprint Championships
Bronze medal – third place	2011 Heerenveen	Sprint
Dutch Single Distance Championships
Gold medal – first place	2007 Assen	500 m
Gold medal – first place	2011 Heerenveen	500 m
Silver medal – second place	2008 Heerenveen	500 m
Silver medal – second place	2009 Heerenveen	500 m
Silver medal – second place	2010 Heerenveen	500 m
Silver medal – second place	2010 Heerenveen	1000 m
Silver medal – second place	2011 Heerenveen	1000 m
Silver medal – second place	2012 Heerenveen	500 m
Dutch Sprint Championships
Gold medal – first place	2009 Groningen	Sprint
Gold medal – first place	2011 Heerenveen	Sprint
Gold medal – first place	2012 Heerenveen	Sprint
Gold medal – first place	2014 Amsterdam	Sprint
Silver medal – second place	2010 Heerenveen	Sprint
Silver medal – second place	2013 Groningen	Sprint
Bronze medal – third place	2007 Groningen	Sprint
Bronze medal – third place	2008 Heerenveen	Sprint
Bronze medal – third place	2016 Heerenveen	Sprint

Margot Madelaine Boer (born 7 August 1985) is a Dutch former speed skater. She specialised in the 500, 1000 and 1500 m.

== Sports career ==
After spending a few years at local teams in the South Holland area, Boer was seen as one of the Netherlands main future talents and was offered a contract at the KNSB youth development team for the 2006–07 season. In the years before she already participated in several World Cup meetings.

Her first success in her new team was winning a gold medal in the 500 m at the 2007 KNSB Dutch Single Distance Championships. She won both races beating all the opponents, including favourites such as Marianne Timmer and Annette Gerritsen.

=== 2010 Winter Olympics ===
Boer qualified to participate in all of her specialty distances at the 2010 Winter Olympics in Vancouver. She just missed out on medals in each of them, coming in 4th on both the 500 and 1500 m and 6th on the 1000 m, 0.22, 0.14, and 0.22 seconds from winning a bronze medal, respectively.

=== 2014 Winter Olympics ===
On 11 February 2014, Boer won the bronze medal in the women's 500 m longtrack speedskating event at the 2014 Sochi Winter Olympics. This is the first medal at the Olympic women's 500 m longtrack speedskating event for the Netherlands. Two days later on 13 February 2014 Boer also won the bronze medal in the women's longtrack 1000 m event, making her the nation's first female skater to win Olympic medals on both sprint distances.

== Personal records ==
Personal records
Speed skating
Event	Result	Date	Location	Notes
500 m	37.28	15 November 2013	Calgary	
1000 m	1:13.77	17 November 2013	Calgary	
1500 m	1:57.00	29 December 2013	Heerenveen	
3000 m	4:35.70	26 February 2005	Kardinge, Groningen	
5000 m	8:12.56	26 February 2006	Kardinge, Groningen	

== Tournament overview ==
Season	Dutch Championships Single Distances	Dutch Championships Sprint	World Championships Sprint	World Championships Single Distances	Olympic Games	World Cup GWC
2003–04	HEERENVEEN 20th 1000m					
2004–05	ASSEN 8th 500m 14th 1000m	GRONINGEN 14th 500m 13th 1000m 15th 500m 17th 1000m 14th overall				35th 500m 20th 1000m
2005–06	HEERENVEEN 6th 500m 11th 1000m	ASSEN 4th 500m (bronze) 1000m 8th 500m 6th 1000m 6th overall				14th 100m 18th 500m 18th 1000m
2006–07	ASSEN (gold) 500m 5th 1000m 5th 1500m	GRONINGEN (bronze) 500m (silver) 1000m (bronze) 500m (silver) 1000m (bronze) overall	HAMAR 9th 500m 8th 1000m 11th 500m 6th 1000m 6th overall	SALT LAKE CITY 10th 2x500m 7th 1000m		19th 100m 8th 500m 12th 1000m 30th 1500m
2007–08	HEERENVEEN (silver) 500m 22nd 1000m	HEERENVEEN (silver) 500m 5th 1000m (silver) 500m 6th 1000m (bronze) overall				30th 500m 13th 1000m 26th 1500m
2008–09	HEERENVEEN (silver) 500m 7th 1000m 17th 1500m	GRONINGEN (gold) 500m (bronze) 1000m (silver) 500m (silver) 1000m (gold) overall	MOSCOW 8th 500m (gold) 1000m 9th 500m (bronze) 1000m 4th overall	VANCOUVER 6th 2x500m (bronze) 1000m		21st 100m (silver) 500m 5th 1000m
2009–10	HEERENVEEN (silver) 500m (silver) 1000m	GRONINGEN (silver) 500m (bronze) 1000m (gold) 500m (gold) 1000m (silver) overall			VANCOUVER 4th 500m*2 6th 1000m 4th 1500m	(silver) 500m (silver) 1000m 13th 1500m
2010–11	HEERENVEEN (gold) 500m (silver) 1000m 7th 1500m	HEERENVEEN (gold) 500m (bronze) 1000m (gold) 500m (bronze) 1000m (gold) overall	HEERENVEEN (silver) 500m 7th 1000m (silver) 500m 18th 1000m (bronze) overall	INZELL 7th 2x500m 6th 1000m		(bronze) 500m (bronze) 1000m 17th 1500m
2011–12	HEERENVEEN (silver) 500m 4th 1000m 4th 1500m	HEERENVEEN (bronze) 500m (silver) 1000m (silver) 500m (bronze) 1000m (gold) overall	CALGARY 4th 500m 4th 1000m 4th 500m 4th 1000m 4th overall	HEERENVEEN 9th 2x500m (bronze) 1000m		4th 500m 4th 1000m 16th 1500m
2012–13	HEERENVEEN (silver) 500m 7th 1000m	GRONINGEN (gold) 500m 4th 1000m (gold) 500m 5th 1000m (silver) overall	SALT LAKE CITY 8th 500m 9th 1000m 11th 500m 7th 1000m 7th overall	SOCHI 16th 2x500m		8th 500m 10th 1000m
2013–14	HEERENVEEN (gold) 500m 4th 1000m 7th 1500m	AMSTERDAM (gold) 500m (bronze) 1000m (gold) 500m (silver) 1000m (gold) overall	NAGANO (silver) 500m (silver) 1000m (silver) 500m (bronze) 1000m 4th overall		SOCHI (bronze) 500m*2 (bronze) 1000m	6th 500m 5th 1000m 11th GWC
2014–15	HEERENVEEN (gold) 500m 8th 1000m 15th 1500m	GRONINGEN (bronze) 500m 5th 1000m (silver) 500m (bronze) 1000m (bronze) overall	ASTANA 9th 500m (bronze) 1000m 10th 500m 7th 1000m 7th overall	HEERENVEEN 11th 2x500m		8th 500m 19th 1000m 24th GWC
2015–16	HEERENVEEN (gold) 500m 5th 1000m	HEERENVEEN (gold) 500m 5th 1000m (gold) 500m 5th 1000m (bronze) overall		KOLOMNA 11th 2x500m		

Awards
Preceded by Paulien van Deutekom	Ard Schenk Award; 2009	Succeeded by Ireen Wüst
