= Floor van den Brandt =

Dutch speed skater

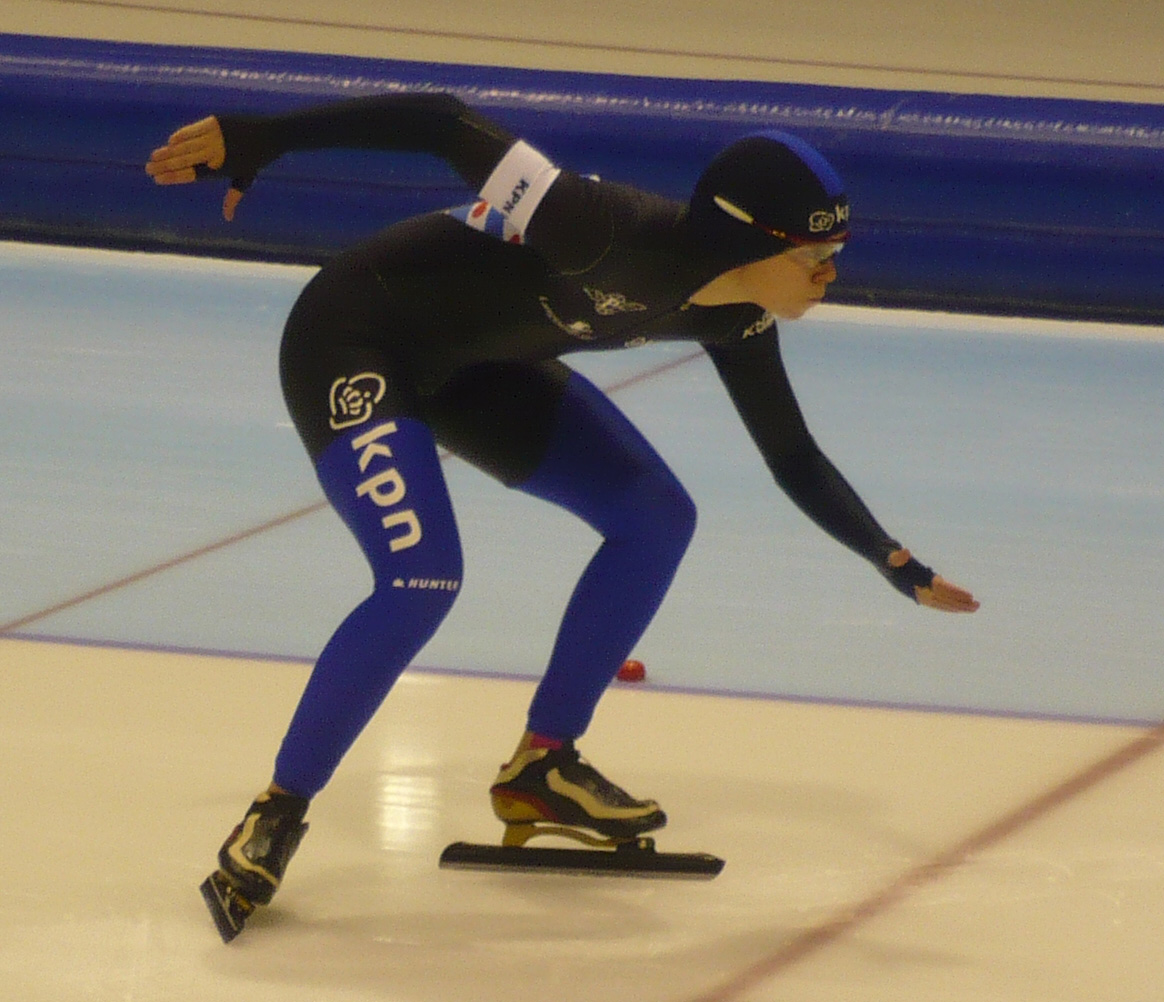

Personal information
- Born: 23 November 1990 (age 35) 's-Hertogenbosch, Netherlands
- Height: 1.66 m (5 ft 5 1/2 in)

Sport
- Country: Netherlands
- Sport: Speed skating

Floor van den Brandt (born 23 November 1990) is a Dutch speed skater who is specialized in the sprint distances.

== Career ==
Van den Brandt finished fourth at the ISU World Cup 500m event in Seoul in November 2014. She is a member of Team AfterPay.

== Personal records ==
Personal records
Speed skating
Event	Result	Date	Location	Notes
500 m	37.76	21 November 2015	Utah Olympic Oval, Salt Lake City	
1000 m	1:17.45	2 November 2014	Thialf, Heerenveen	
1500 m	2:04.17	23 January 2012	Thialf, Heerenveen	
3000 m	4:33.43	8 March 2008	Thialf, Heerenveen	
