= Laurine van Riessen =

Dutch speed skater and track cyclist

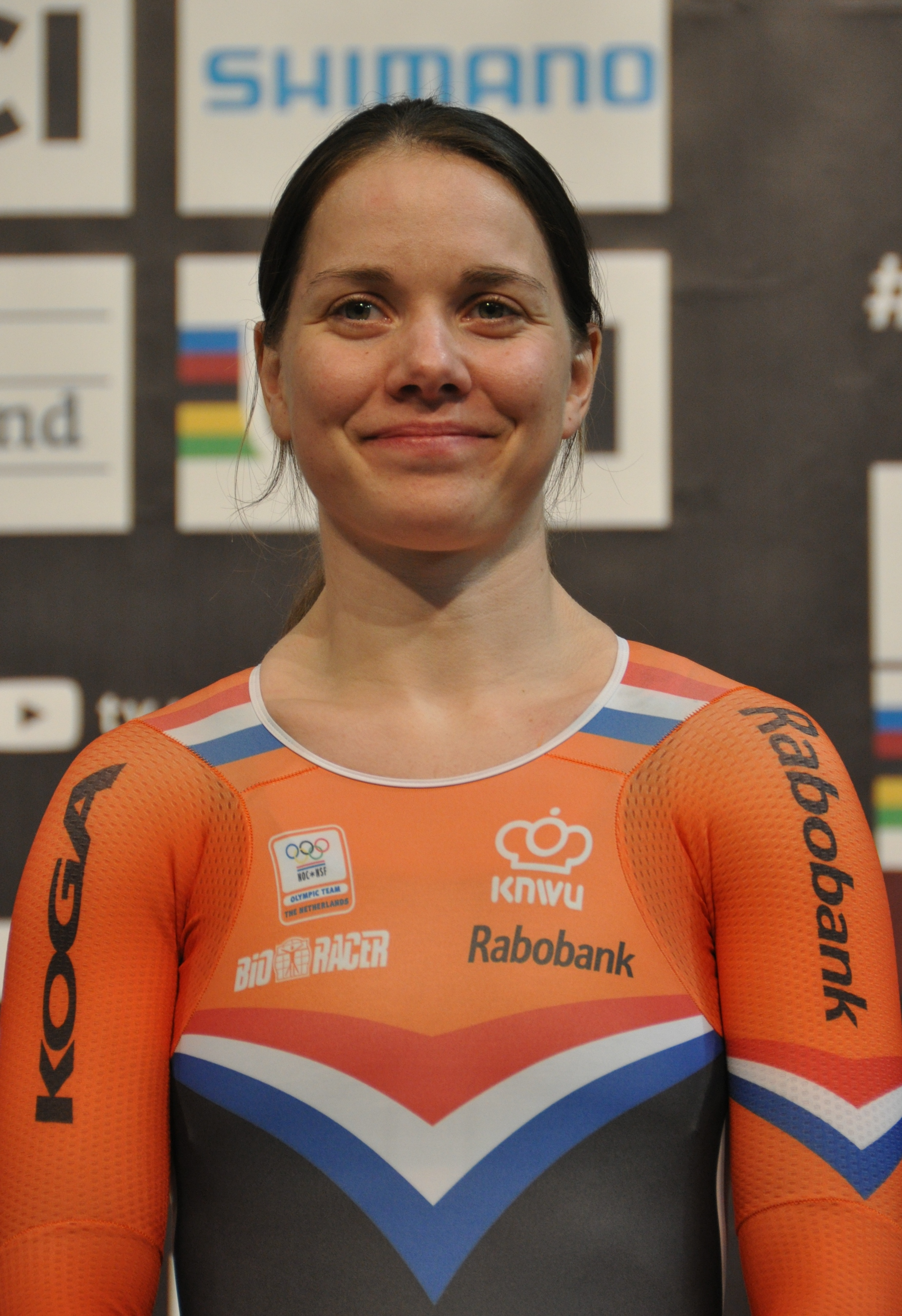
- Van Riessen in 2016

Personal information
- Born: Laurine van Riessen; 10 August 1987 (age 39) Leiden, Netherlands
- Cycling career
- Height: 1.68 m (5 ft 6 in)
- Weight: 62 kg (137 lb)
- Sport: Cycling
- Current team: BEAT CC p/b Saxo
- Discipline: Track
- Role: Rider

Professional teams
- 2017: Matrix Pro Cycling
- 2018–: BEAT Cycling Club

Sport
- Sport: Track cycling; Speed skating
Medal record
Representing the Netherlands
Women's speed skating
Olympic Games
Bronze medal – third place	2010 Vancouver	1000 m
Women's track cycling
World Championships
Silver medal – second place	2018 Apeldoorn	Team sprint
European Track Championships
Bronze medal – third place	2015 Grenchen	Team sprint
Bronze medal – third place	2022 Munich	Sprint

Laurine van Riessen (born 10 August 1987) is a Dutch long track speed skater and track cyclist, who currently rides for UCI Track Team BEAT CC p/b Saxo. She competed for the Netherlands at the 2010 Winter Olympics in Vancouver in the 500, 1000, and 1500 metres and won the bronze medal in the 1000 metres. In 2015, she switched to track cycling and won a bronze medal in the team sprint at the 2015 UEC European Track Championships in Grenchen, Switzerland.

Van Riessen competed for the Netherlands in track cycling at the 2016 Summer Olympics in Rio de Janeiro, Brazil. In 2017, she rode for the British team Matrix Pro Cycling. On 4 September 2018 she joined BEAT Cycling Club.

== Major results ==
2015
National Track Championships

1st 500m time trial
1st Individual sprint
1st Keirin

US Grand Prix of Sprinting

1st 500m time trial
2nd Individual sprint

Independence Day Grand Prix

1st Keirin
1st Sprint
3rd 500m Time Trial

Grand Prix of Colorado Springs

1st Keirin
1st Sprint
1st Team Sprint (with Yesna Rijkhoff)

Vic Williams Memorial Grand Prix

1st 500m time trial
2nd Individual sprint

2nd Keirin, Internationale Radsport Meeting
3rd European Track Championships (Team sprint)

2016
Milton International Challenge

1st Keirin
1st Sprint
1st 500m Time Trial

National Track Championships

1st Individual sprint
3rd Keirin

Apeldoorn Track Championships

2nd Team sprint
3rd Individual sprint

3rd Grenchen Track Cycling Challenge (Individual sprint)
3rd Sprint, Dudenhofen
3rd Sprint, Öschelbronn

2017
Belgian International Track Meeting

1st Sprint
1st Keirin

Internationaal Baan Sprint Keirin Toernooi

1st Sprint
1st Keirin

Dublin International

1st Sprint
1st Keirin

3rd Keirin, Six Days of Rotterdam
3rd Sprint, Öschelbronn

2018
1st Keirin, Worldcup Track Cycling Saint Quentin-en-Yvelines
