= Bo van der Werff =

Dutch speed skater

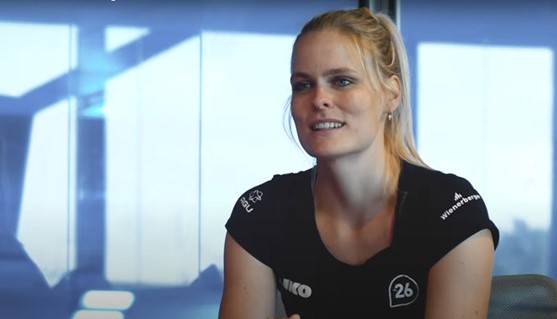
Bo van der Werff (2019)

Bo van der Werff (born 24 August 1992 in Eelde) is a Dutch long track speed skater, who prefers short and middle distances. She won a gold medal in the 1000 meters at the Dutch Junior speed skating championship in 2010. In the 2011–2012 season, she was contracted to the speed skating team Team Anker. She later joined the iSkate Development Team.

== Records ==
=== Personal records ===
Personal records
Speed skating
Event	Result	Date	Location	Notes
500 m	38.21	13 November 2015	Olympic Oval, Calgary	
1000 m	1:17.38	2 November 2014	Thialf, Heerenveen	
1500 m	2:04.12	8 January 2011	Thialf, Heerenveen	
3000 m	4:25.53	27 February 2010	Thialf, Heerenveen	
