= Lotte van Beek =

Dutch speed skater (born 1991)

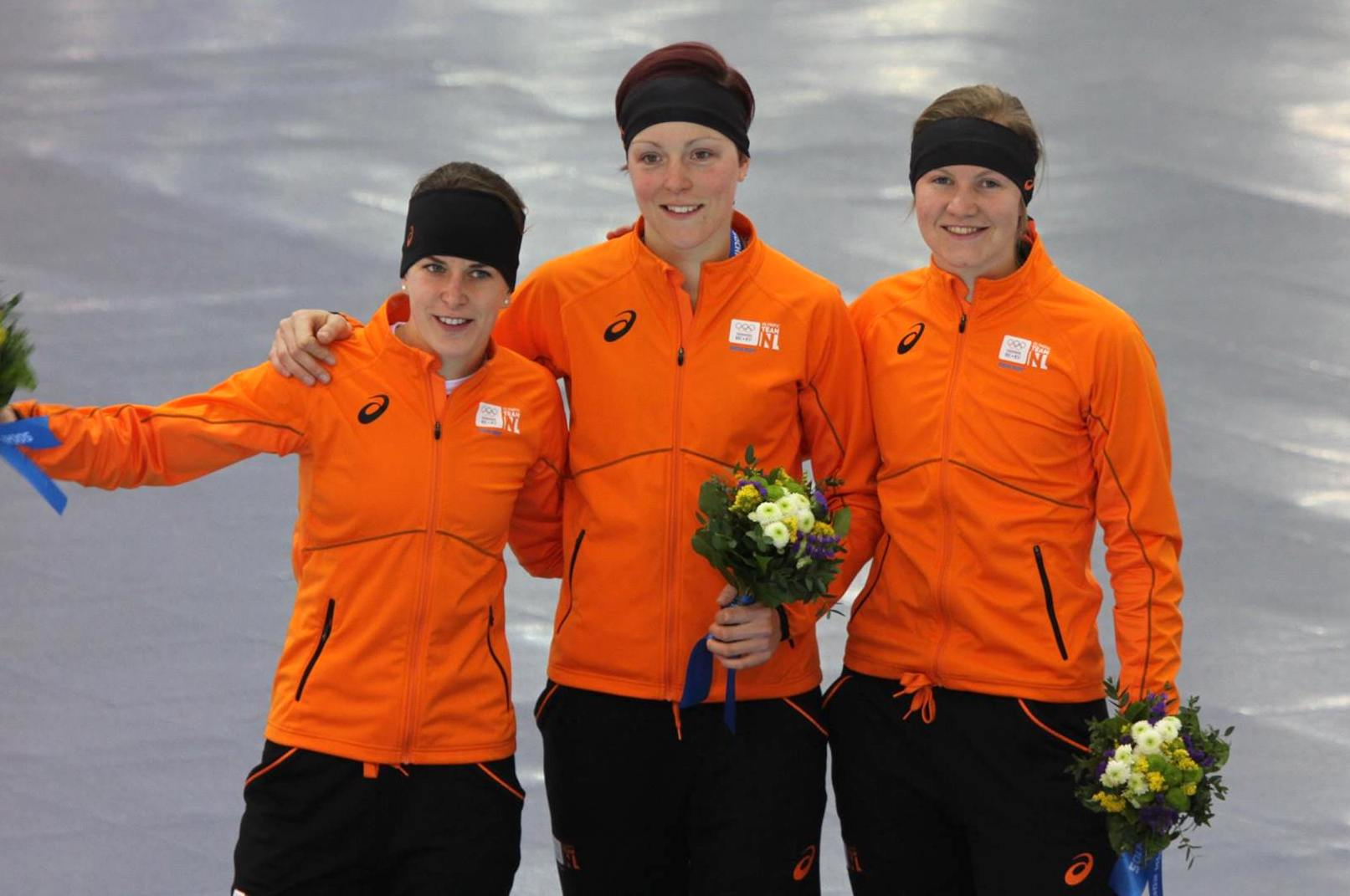
- Van Beek (right) with Ireen Wüst (left) and Jorien ter Mors (centre) on the 2014 Winter Olympics women's team pursuit podium

Personal information
- Born: 9 December 1991 (age 34) Zwolle, Netherlands
- Height: 1.80 m (5 ft 11 in)
- Weight: 69 kg (152 lb)

Sport
- Country: Netherlands
- Sport: Speed skating
Medal record
Women's speed skating
Representing Netherlands
Olympic Games
Gold medal – first place	2014 Sochi	Team pursuit
Silver medal – second place	2018 Pyeongchang	Team pursuit
Bronze medal – third place	2014 Sochi	1500 m
World Championships
Silver medal – second place	2013 Sochi	1500 m
European Single Distance Championships
Gold medal – first place	2018 Kolomna	1500 m
Gold medal – first place	2018 Kolomna	Team pursuit

Lotte van Beek (Dutch pronunciation: [ˈlɔtə vɑm ˈbeːk]; born 9 December 1991) is a retired Dutch speed skater.

She finished second on the women's 1500 metres event at the 2013 World Single Distance Championships. At the 2014 Winter Olympics, she was part of the Dutch team who won a gold medal on the women team pursuit; she also won a bronze medal on the women's 1500 metres. At the 2018 European Single Distance Speed Skating Championships, she won a gold medal on the women's 1500 metres and another with the Dutch women pursuit team.

At the 2018 Winter Olympics, she was part of the Dutch women pursuit team who won a silver medal.

== Records ==
=== Personal records ===
Personal records
Speed skating
Event	Result	Date	Location	Notes
500 m	38.25	26 January 2013	Salt Lake City	
1000 m	1:13.36	10 November 2013	Calgary	
1500 m	1:52.95	9 November 2013	Calgary	
3000 m	4:09.04	20 October 2018	Inzell	
5000 m	7:32.59	17 February 2013	Hamar	
