= List of Norwegian records in speed skating =

The following are the national records in speed skating in Norway maintained by the Norges Skøyteforbund (NSF).

== Men ==
Key to tables: Awaiting ratification Record not kept by NSF Not ratified or later rescinded by NSF

Event	Record	Athlete	Date	Meet	Place	Ref
500 meters	33.99	Bjørn Magnussen	15 November 2025	World Cup	Salt Lake City, United States	
500 meters × 2	69.70	Bjørn Magnussen	25 October 2025 (Note: 25 October 2015 by NSF source, probably a typo)		Stavanger, Norway	
1000 meters	1:06.51	Håvard Holmefjord Lorentzen	9 March 2019	World Cup	Salt Lake City, United States	
1500 meters	1:41.34	Peder Kongshaug	15 November 2025	World Cup	Salt Lake City, United States	
3000 meters	3:37.28 WR	Eskil Ervik	5 November 2005		Calgary, Canada	
5000 meters	5:58.52 WR	Sander Eitrem	24 January 2026	World Cup	Inzell, Germany	
10000 meters	12:38.04	Sander Eitrem	25 January 2025	World Cup	Calgary, Canada	
Team sprint (3 laps)	1:17.31	Henrik Fagerli Rukke; Bjørn Magnussen; Håvard Holmefjord Lorentzen	15 February 2024	World Single Distances Championships	Calgary, Canada	
Team pursuit (8 laps)	3:34.22	Sander Eitrem; Peder Kongshaug; Sverre Lunde Pedersen	5 January 2024	European Championships	Heerenveen, Netherlands	
Sprint combination	136.280 pts	Håvard Holmefjord Lorentzen	25–26 February 2017	World Sprint Championships	Calgary, Canada	
Small combination	148.457 pts	Petter Andersen	15–17 March 2001		Calgary, Canada	
Big combination	145.804 pts	Sander Eitrem	7–8 March 2026	World Allround Championships	Heerenveen, Netherlands	

== Women ==
Event	Record	Athlete	Date	Meet	Place	Ref
500 meters	37.43	Hege Bøkko	25 February 2017	World Sprint Championships	Calgary, Canada	
500 meters × 2	77.79	Hege Bøkko	13 February 2016	World Single Distance Championships	Kolomna, Russia	
1000 meters	1:13.81	Hege Bøkko	10 December 2017	World Cup	Salt Lake City, United States	
1500 meters	1:51.96	Ragne Wiklund	15 November 2025	World Cup	Salt Lake City, United States	
3000 meters	3:54.74	Sander Eitrem	24 January 2026	World Cup	Inzell, Germany	
5000 meters	6:46.15	Ragne Wiklund	5 March 2023	World Single Distances Championships	Heerenveen, Netherlands	
10000 meters	14:47.49	Mari Hemmer	20 March 2009	Olympic Oval Final	Calgary, Canada	
Team sprint (3 laps)	1:26.38	Martine Ripsrud; Hege Bøkko; Ida Njåtun	1 December 2017	World Cup	Calgary, Canada	
Team pursuit (6 laps)	2:56.79	Sofie Karoline Haugen; Marit Fjellanger Bøhm; Ragne Wiklund	4 December 2021	World Cup	Salt Lake City, United States	
Sprint combination	149.310 pts	Hege Bøkko	25–26 February 2017	World Sprint Championships	Calgary, Canada	
Mini combination	161.014 pts	Hege Bøkko	12–13 March 2010	World Junior Championships	Moscow, Russia	
Small combination	157.457 pts	Ragne Wiklund	7–8 March 2026	World Allround Championships	Heerenveen, Netherlands	

== Mixed ==
Event	Record	Athlete	Date	Meet	Place	Ref
Relay	2:57.63	Bjørn Magnussen; Julie Nistad Samsonsen	14 December 2025	World Cup	Hamar, Norway	
