= List of Dutch records in speed skating =

The following are the national records in speed skating in The Netherlands maintained by the Royal Dutch Speed Skating Association (KNSB).

== Men ==
Event	Record	Athlete	Date	Meet	Place	Ref
500 meters	33.63	Jenning de Boo	16 November 2025	World Cup	Salt Lake City, United States	
500 meters × 2	68.73	Jenning de Boo	8 November 2024	KNSB International Qualification & Invitation Cup	Heerenveen, Netherlands	
1000 meters	1:06.05	Jenning de Boo	25 January 2025	World Cup	Calgary, Canada	
1500 meters	1:40.17 WR	Kjeld Nuis	10 March 2019	World Cup	Salt Lake City, United States	
3000 meters	3.35.49	Patrick Roest	20 December 2021		Heerenveen, Netherlands	
5000 meters	6:02.98	Patrick Roest	28 January 2024	World Cup	Salt Lake City, United States	
10,000 meters	12:35.20	Patrick Roest	28 December 2020	Dutch Qualification Tournament	Heerenveen, Netherlands	
Team sprint (3 laps)	1:17.17	Janno Botman; Jenning de Boo; Tim Prins	15 February 2024	World Single Distances Championships	Calgary, Canada	
Team pursuit (8 laps)	3:34.68	Sven Kramer; Marcel Bosker; Douwe de Vries	15 February 2020	World Single Distances Championships	Salt Lake City, United States	
Sprint combination	134.670 pts WR	Jenning de Boo	5–6 March 2026	World Sprint Championships	Heerenveen, Netherlands	
Small combination	146.365 pts WR	Erben Wennemars	12–13 August 2005	Summer Classic	Calgary, Canada	
Big combination	145.561 pts	Patrick Roest	2–3 March 2019	World Allround Championships	Calgary, Canada	
One hour	43,735.34 m WB	Erik Jan Kooiman	9 December 2015		Inzell, Germany	

== Women ==
Event	Record	Athlete	Date	Meet	Place	Ref
500 meters	36.09 WR	Femke Kok	16 November 2025	World Cup	Salt Lake City, United States	
500 meters × 2	74.44	Femke Kok	27 December 2020	Dutch Qualification Tournament	Heerenveen, Netherlands	
1000 meters	1:11.84	Jutta Leerdam	15 February 2020	World Single Distances Championships	Salt Lake City, United States	
1500 meters	1:50.70	Ireen Wüst	10 March 2019	World Cup	Salt Lake City, United States	
3000 meters	3:52.89	Irene Schouten	3 December 2021	World Cup	Salt Lake City, United States	
5000 meters	6:41.25	Irene Schouten	5 March 2023	World Single Distances Championships	Heerenveen, Netherlands	
10,000 meters	14:35.61	Carien Kleibeuker	13 March 2018	Kleine en Grote Meerkamp STW Wageningen	Heerenveen, Netherlands	
Team sprint (3 laps)	1:24.02 WR	Femke Kok; Jutta Leerdam; Letitia de Jong	13 February 2020	World Single Distances Championships	Salt Lake City, United States	
Team pursuit (6 laps)	2:51.20	Joy Beune; Irene Schouten; Marijke Groenewoud	16 February 2024	World Single Distances Championships	Calgary, Canada	
Sprint combination	146.670 pts	Femke Kok	5–6 March 2026	World Sprint Championships	Heerenveen, Netherlands	
Mini combination	153.776 pts WR	Joy Beune	9–10 March 2018	World Junior Championships	Salt Lake City, United States	
Small combination	157.268 pts	Joy Beune	9–10 March 2024	World Allround Championships	Inzell, Germany	
One hour	40,569.68 m WB	Carien Kleibeuker	9 December 2015		Inzell, Germany	

== Mixed ==
Event	Record	Athlete	Date	Meet	Place	Ref
Relay	2:54.05 WR	Wesly Dijs; Chloé Hoogendoorn	23 November 2025	World Cup	Calgary, Canada	
