= List of world records in speed skating =

This list of speed skating records is an overview of the records currently held in various speed skating events, as ratified by the International Skating Union.

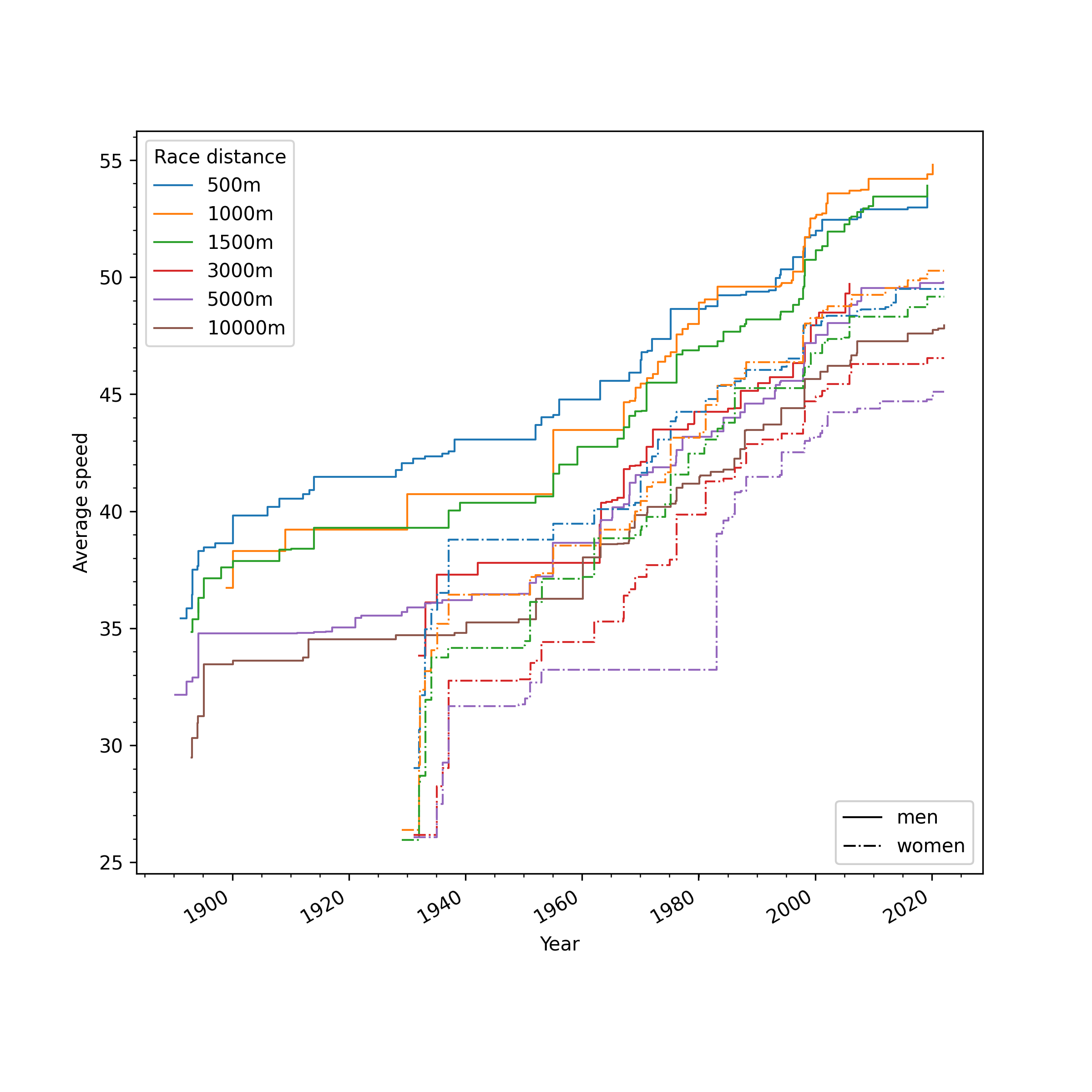
World record progression

== World records ==
=== Men ===
Event	Name	Country	Time	Date	Place	Average speed	Meeting	Ref
500 meters Progression	Pavel Kulizhnikov	Russia	33.61	9 March 2019	(United States) Salt Lake City	53.56 km/h (33.28 mph)	2018–19 World Cup Final	
500 meters × 2 Progression	Jenning de Boo	Netherlands	68.22	14 February 2025	(Netherlands) Heerenveen		2025 Dutch Single Distances Championships	
1000 meters Progression	Jordan Stolz	United States	1:05.37	26 January 2024	(United States) Salt Lake City	55.38 km/h (34.41 mph)	2023–24 World Cup	
1500 meters Progression	Kjeld Nuis	Netherlands	1:40.17	10 March 2019	(United States) Salt Lake City	53.91 km/h (33.50 mph)	2018–19 World Cup Final	
3000 meters Progression	Metoděj Jílek	Czechia	3:32.52	26 October 2025	(United States) Salt Lake City	50.82 km/h (31.58 mph)	2025 Fall World Cup Qualifier	
5000 meters Progression	Sander Eitrem	Norway	5:58.52	24 January 2026	(Germany) Inzell	50.20 km/h (31.19 mph)	2025–26 World Cup 5	
10000 meters Progression	Davide Ghiotto	Italy	12:25.69	25 January 2025	(Canada) Calgary	48.28 km/h (30.00 mph)	2024–25 ISU World Cup 3	
Team sprint (3 laps); Progression	Austin Kleba; Cooper McLeod; Zach Stoppelmoor	United States	1:16.98	26 January 2025	(Canada) Calgary		2024–25 ISU World Cup 3	
Team pursuit (8 laps) * Progression	Casey Dawson; Emery Lehman; Ethan Cepuran	United States	3:32.49	16 November 2025	(United States) Salt Lake City		2025–26 World Cup	
Sprint combination Progression	Jenning de Boo	Netherlands	134.670 pts	5–6 March 2026	(Netherlands) Heerenveen		2026 World Sprint Championships	
Small combination	Erben Wennemars	Netherlands	146.365 pts	12–13 August 2005	(Canada) Calgary		Summer Classic 2005	
Big combination Progression	Jordan Stolz	United States	144.740 pts	9–10 March 2024	(Germany) Inzell		2024 World Allround Championships	
One hour **	Erik Jan Kooiman	Netherlands	43,735.94 m	9 December 2015	(Germany) Inzell	43.73 km/h (27.17 mph)		

- * The average speed for the team pursuit race was calculated using a distance of 3098,88 meters for the men's race. The skaters only utilize the inner lane and the lap distance is accordingly less than the 400 meters of a regular lap skated with one inner curve and one outer curve. For comparison, the fastest known 400m lap was skated by Jenning de Boo on 25 January 2025 in Calgary during a 1000-meter, with a lap time of 23.92 seconds and an average speed of 60.20 km/h (37.41 mph).
- ** unofficial world best (not recognized as a world record by ISU)

=== Women ===
Event	Name	Country	Time	Date	Place	Average speed	Meeting	Ref
500 meters Progression	Femke Kok	Netherlands	36.09	16 November 2025	(United States) Salt Lake City	49.88 km/h (30.99 mph)	2025–26 World Cup	
500 meters × 2	Femke Kok	Netherlands	73.97	15 February 2025	(Netherlands) Heerenveen		2025 Dutch Single Distances Championships	
1000 meters Progression	Brittany Bowe	United States	1:11.61	9 March 2019	(United States) Salt Lake City	50.27 km/h (31.24 mph)	2018–19 World Cup Final	
1500 meters Progression	Miho Takagi	Japan	1:49.83	10 March 2019	(United States) Salt Lake City	49.17 km/h (30.55 mph)	2018–19 World Cup Final	
3000 meters Progression	Martina Sáblíková	Czech Republic	3:52.02	9 March 2019	(United States) Salt Lake City	46.55 km/h (28.92 mph)	2018–19 World Cup Final	
5000 meters Progression	Natalya Voronina	Russia	6:39.02	15 February 2020	(United States) Salt Lake City	45.11 km/h (28.03 mph)	2020 World Single Distances Championships	
10,000 meters *** Progression	Martina Sáblíková	Czech Republic	13:48.33	15 March 2007	(Canada) Calgary	43.46 km/h (27.00 mph)	Olympic Oval Finale 2007	
Team sprint (3 laps); Progression	Femke Kok; Jutta Leerdam; Letitia de Jong	Netherlands	1:24.02	13 February 2020	(United States) Salt Lake City		2020 World Single Distances Championships	
Team pursuit (6 laps) ** Progression	Nana Takagi; Ayano Sato; Miho Takagi	Japan	2:50.76	14 February 2020	(United States) Salt Lake City	49.00 km/h (30.45 mph)	2020 World Single Distances Championships	
Sprint combination Progression	Nao Kodaira	Japan	146.390 pts	25–26 February 2017	(Canada) Calgary		2017 World Sprint Championships	
Mini combination	Joy Beune	Netherlands	153.776 pts	9–10 March 2018	(United States) Salt Lake City		2018 World Junior Championships	
Small combination Progression	Cindy Klassen	Canada	154.580 pts	18–19 March 2006	(Canada) Calgary		2006 World Allround Championships	
One hour ***	Carien Kleibeuker	Netherlands	40,569.56 m	9 December 2015	(Germany) Inzell	40.57 km/h (25.21 mph)		

- ** The average speed for the team pursuit race was calculated using a distance of 2324,16 meters for the women's race. The skaters only utilize the inner lane and the lap distance is accordingly less than the 400 meters of a regular lap skated with one inner curve and one outer curve. For comparison, the fastest known 400m lap was skated by Femke Kok during a 500m race in Salt Lake City on 16 November 2025, with a lap time of 25.90 seconds and an average speed of 55.60 km/h (34.55 mph).
- *** unofficial world best (not recognized as a world record by ISU)

=== Mixed ===
Event	Name	Country	Time	Date	Place	Average speed	Meeting	Ref
Mixed Gender Relay	Wesley Dijs; Chloé Hoogendoorn	Netherlands	2:54.05	23 November 2025	(Canada) Calgary		2025–26 World Cup	

== Sea-level world bests ==
Salt Lake City and Calgary, where most of the current world records were set (see above), are at comparatively high altitudes (greater than 1 km above sea level). Performance is better at these high altitudes because the lower oxygen levels are compensated by the reduced air resistance. Skating statisticians therefore record separate lists of "sea-level world bests" for speed skating records that are set at (or close to) sea level, from which results in Salt Lake City and Calgary are excluded.

=== Men ===
Event	Name	Country	Time	Date	Place	Meeting	Ref
500 meters	Jordan Stolz	United States	33.77	14 February 2026	(Italy) Milan	2026 Winter Olympics	
500 meters × 2	Jenning de Boo	Netherlands	68.22	14 February 2025	(Netherlands) Heerenveen	2025 Dutch Single Distances Championships	
1000 meters	Jordan Stolz	United States	1:06.16	31 January 2025	(United States) Milwaukee	2024–25 World Cup	
1500 meters	Jordan Stolz	United States	1:41.46	1 February 2025	(United States) Milwaukee	2024–25 World Cup	
3000 meters	Metoděj Jílek	Czech Republic	3:34.09	16 September 2025	(Netherlands) Heerenveen	Rick Schipper Test Match	
5000 meters	Sander Eitrem	Norway	5:58.52	24 January 2026	(Germany) Inzell	2025–26 World Cup	
10000 meters	Davide Ghiotto	Italy	12:26.30	26 October 2024	(Germany) Inzell	Invitation Race	
Team sprint (3 laps)	Stefan Westenbroek; Jenning de Boo; Tim Prins	Netherlands	1:17.22	7 December 2025	(Netherlands) Heerenveen	2025–26 World Cup	
Team pursuit (8 laps)	Sander Eitrem; Peder Kongshaug; Sverre Lunde Pedersen	Norway	3:34.22	5 January 2024	(Netherlands) Heerenveen	2024 European Championships	
Sprint combination	Jenning de Boo	Netherlands	134.670 pts	5–6 March 2026	(Netherlands) Heerenveen	2026 World Sprint Championships	
Small combination	Koen Verweij	Netherlands	148.517 pts	12–13 March 2010	(Russia) Moscow	2010 World Junior Championships	
Big combination	Jordan Stolz	United States	144.740 pts	9–10 March 2024	(Germany) Inzell	2024 World Allround Championships	

=== Women ===
Event	Name	Country	Time	Date	Place	Meeting	Ref
500 meters	Femke Kok	Netherlands	36.49	15 February 2026	(Italy) Milan	2026 Winter Olympics	
500 meters × 2	Femke Kok	Netherlands	73.97	15 February 2025	(Netherlands) Heerenveen	2025 Dutch Single Distances Championships	
1000 meters	Jutta Leerdam	Netherlands	1:12.31	9 February 2026	(Italy) Milan	2026 Winter Olympics	
1500 meters	Joy Beune	Netherlands	1:52.11	1 February 2025	(United States) Milwaukee	2024–25 World Cup	
3000 meters	Irene Schouten	Netherlands	3:54.04	20 November 2022	(Netherlands) Heerenveen	2022–23 World Cup	
5000 meters	Irene Schouten	Netherlands	6:41.25	5 March 2023	(Netherlands) Heerenveen	2023 World Single Distances Championships	
Team sprint (3 laps)	Anna Boersma; Marrit Fledderus; Femke Kok	Netherlands	1:25.18	7 December 2025	(Netherlands) Heerenveen	2025–26 World Cup	
Team pursuit (6 laps)	Ivanie Blondin; Valérie Maltais; Isabelle Weidemann	Canada	2:53.44	15 February 2022	(China) Beijing	2022 Winter Olympics	
Sprint combination	Femke Kok	Netherlands	146.670 pts	5–6 March 2026	(Netherlands) Heerenveen	2026 World Sprint Championships	
Mini combination	Cindy Klassen	Canada	157.950 pts	15–17 November 2002	(Germany) Erfurt	2002–03 World Cup	
Small combination	Joy Beune	Netherlands	157.268 pts	9–10 March 2024	(Germany) Inzell	2024 World Allround Championships	
