= Speed skating at the 2026 Winter Olympics – Women's 1500 metres =

Women's 1500 metres at the XXV Olympic Winter Games
- Speed skating
- Venue: Milano Speed Skating Stadium, Milan
- Date: 20 February 2026
- Competitors: 29 from 16 nations
- Winning time: 1:54.09

Medalists
1st place, gold medalist(s)		Antoinette Rijpma-de Jong	Netherlands
2nd place, silver medalist(s)		Ragne Wiklund	Norway
3rd place, bronze medalist(s)		Valérie Maltais	Canada

The women's 1500 m competition in speed skating at the 2026 Winter Olympics was held on 20 February, at the Milano Speed Skating Stadium in Milan.

Antoinette Rijpma-de Jong of the Netherlands won the event, her first Olympic gold medal and fifth straight gold for the Netherlands in this event. Ragne Wiklund of Norway won silver, her third medal. Valérie Maltais of Canada won bronze, her third medal of the games and fourth medal overall.

== Background ==
The 2022 champion, Ireen Wüst, retired from competitions. The silver medalist, Miho Takagi, qualified for the event, as did the bronze medalist, Antoinette Rijpma-de Jong. Before the Olympics, Takagi was leading the 1500m standings of the 2025–26 ISU Speed Skating World Cup. Joy Beune was the 1500m 2025 world champion.

== Records ==
Prior to this competition, the existing world, Olympic and track records were as follows.

World record	Miho Takagi (JPN)	1:49.83	Salt Lake City, United States	10 March 2019
Olympic record	Ireen Wüst (NED)	1:53.28	Beijing, China	7 February 2022
Track record	Meike Veen (NED)	1:57.66		30 November 2025

== Results ==
Rank	Pair	Lane	Name	Country	Time	Time behind	Notes
1st place, gold medalist(s)	14	O	Antoinette Rijpma-de Jong	Netherlands	1:54.09		TR
2nd place, silver medalist(s)	13	O	Ragne Wiklund	Norway	1:54.15	+0.06	
3rd place, bronze medalist(s)	10	O	Valérie Maltais	Canada	1:54.40	+0.31	
4	14	I	Brittany Bowe	United States	1:54.70	+0.61	
5	1	I	Femke Kok	Netherlands	1:54.79	+0.70	
6	15	O	Miho Takagi	Japan	1:54.865	+0.77	
7	11	I	Elizaveta Golubeva	Kazakhstan	1:54.868	+0.77	
8	12	I	Ivanie Blondin	Canada	1:54.93	+0.84	
9	11	O	Han Mei	China	1:54.97	+0.88	
10	7	I	Marijke Groenewoud	Netherlands	1:55.16	+1.07	
11	12	O	Kaitlyn McGregor	Switzerland	1:55.39	+1.30	
12	13	I	Nadezhda Morozova	Kazakhstan	1:55.76	+1.67	
13	9	O	Francesca Lollobrigida	Italy	1:56.51	+2.42	
14	15	I	Nikola Zdráhalová	Czech Republic	1:56.93	+2.84	
15	7	O	Natalia Czerwonka	Poland	1:56.96	+2.87	
16	5	I	Jeannine Rosner	Austria	1:57.24	+3.15	
17	4	I	Béatrice Lamarche	Canada	1:57.65	+3.56	
18	6	I	Lea Sophie Scholz	Germany	1:57.68	+3.59	
19	8	O	Yin Qi	China	1:57.75	+3.66	
20	10	I	Isabelle van Elst	Belgium	1:57.82	+3.73	
21	5	O	Park Ji-woo	South Korea	1:58.26	+4.17	
22	9	I	Ayano Sato	Japan	1:58.36	+4.27	
23	2	I	Ellia Smeding	Great Britain	1:58.40	+4.31	
24	2	O	Arina Ilyachshenko	Kazakhstan	1:58.43	+4.34	
25	3	I	Aurora Grinden Løvås	Norway	1:58.77	+4.68	
26	6	O	Momoka Horikawa	Japan	1:59.33	+5.24	
27	4	O	Li Jiaxuan	China	1:59.36	+5.27	
28	3	O	Lim Lee-won	South Korea	1:59.73	+5.64	
29	8	I	Greta Myers	United States	1:59.81	+5.72	
