= 2019 World Allround Speed Skating Championships – Women =

Women at the World Allround Speed Skating Championships
- Venue: Olympic Oval
- Location: Calgary, Canada
- Dates: 2–3 March
- Competitors: 24 from 13 nations
- Winning points: 156.306

Medalists
gold medal	Martina Sáblíková	Czech Republic
silver medal	Miho Takagi	Japan
bronze medal	Antoinette de Jong	Netherlands

The Women competition at the 2019 World Allround Speed Skating Championships was held on 2 and 3 March 2019.

== Results ==
=== 500 m ===
The race was started on 2 March at 12:00.

Rank	Pair	Lane	Name	Country	Time	Diff
1	9	O	Miho Takagi	Japan	37.22	
2	9	I	Ireen Wüst	Netherlands	38.46	+1.24
3	11	O	Antoinette de Jong	Netherlands	38.52	+1.30
4	12	O	Nana Takagi	Japan	38.67	+1.45
5	7	O	Ida Njåtun	Norway	38.69	+1.47
6	7	I	Han Mei	China	38.80	+1.58
7	10	I	Elizaveta Kazelina	Russia	38.86	+1.64
8	6	I	Nikola Zdráhalová	Czech Republic	38.91	+1.69
9	10	O	Ayano Sato	Japan	38.99	+1.77
10	12	I	Ivanie Blondin	Canada	39.02	+1.80
11	11	I	Francesca Lollobrigida	Italy	39.06	+1.84
12	8	I	Carlijn Achtereekte	Netherlands	39.25	+2.03
13	5	O	Martina Sáblíková	Czech Republic	39.32	+2.10
14	2	I	Evgeniia Lalenkova	Russia	39.42	+2.20
15	6	O	Karolina Bosiek	Poland	39.57	+2.35
16	1	I	Natalia Voronina	Russia	39.73	+2.51
17	8	O	Ragne Wiklund	Norway	40.03	+2.81
17	5	I	Maryna Zuyeva	Belarus	40.03	+2.81
19	4	I	Isabelle Weidemann	Canada	40.34	+3.12
20	4	O	Roxanne Dufter	Germany	40.37	+3.15
21	3	O	Valérie Maltais	Canada	40.42	+3.20
22	1	O	Saskia Alusalu	Estonia	41.38	+4.16
23	3	I	Carlijn Schoutens	United States	41.70	+4.48
—	2	O	Claudia Pechstein	Germany	Disqualified	

=== 3000 m ===
The race was started on 2 March at 13:05.

Rank	Pair	Lane	Name	Country	Time	Diff
1	11	O	Martina Sáblíková	Czech Republic	3:53.31 WR	
2	11	I	Antoinette de Jong	Netherlands	3:58.25	+4.94
3	10	I	Isabelle Weidemann	Canada	3:58.51	+5.20
4	12	O	Carlijn Achtereekte	Netherlands	3:58.70	+5.39
5	12	I	Natalia Voronina	Russia	3:59.48	+6.17
6	8	O	Ireen Wüst	Netherlands	3:59.79	+6.48
7	5	I	Maryna Zuyeva	Belarus	3:59.80	+6.49
8	10	O	Miho Takagi	Japan	4:00.16	+6.85
9	9	I	Ivanie Blondin	Canada	4:01.77	+8.46
10	9	O	Valérie Maltais	Canada	4:03.20	+9.89
11	7	I	Claudia Pechstein	Germany	4:03.96	+10.65
12	8	I	Ida Njåtun	Norway	4:04.14	+10.83
13	6	I	Evgeniia Lalenkova	Russia	4:05.06	+11.75
14	5	O	Francesca Lollobrigida	Italy	4:06.11	+12.80
15	6	O	Ayano Sato	Japan	4:08.13	+14.82
16	4	O	Nana Takagi	Japan	4:08.18	+14.87
17	7	O	Roxanne Dufter	Germany	4:08.57	+15.26
18	2	I	Nikola Zdráhalová	Czech Republic	4:09.24	+15.93
19	3	O	Carlijn Schoutens	United States	4:10.12	+16.81
20	2	O	Ragne Wiklund	Norway	4:11.31	+18.00
21	1	O	Elizaveta Kazelina	Russia	4:12.08	+18.77
22	4	I	Karolina Bosiek	Poland	4:13.28	+19.97
23	1	I	Han Mei	China	4:14.60	+21.29
—	3	I	Saskia Alusalu	Estonia	Disqualified	

=== 1500 m ===
The race was started on 3 March at 12:00.

Rank	Pair	Lane	Name	Country	Time	Diff
1	11	I	Miho Takagi	Japan	1:52.08	
2	10	O	Ireen Wüst	Netherlands	1:53.48	+1.39
3	9	O	Ivanie Blondin	Canada	1:53.59	+1.50
4	11	O	Martina Sáblíková	Czech Republic	1:53.70	+1.61
5	9	I	Carlijn Achtereekte	Netherlands	1:53.93	+1.84
6	10	I	Antoinette de Jong	Netherlands	1:53.96	+1.87
7	7	I	Maryna Zuyeva	Belarus	1:54.83	+2.74
8	5	I	Evgeniia Lalenkova	Russia	1:55.09	+3.00
9	6	O	Isabelle Weidemann	Canada	1:55.22	+3.14
10	7	O	Nana Takagi	Japan	1:55.40	+3.32
11	8	I	Ida Njåtun	Norway	1:55.42	+3.33
12	5	O	Ayano Sato	Japan	1:55.56	+3.47
13	4	O	Elizaveta Kazelina	Russia	1:55.73	+3.65
14	4	I	Nikola Zdráhalová	Czech Republic	1:55.81	+3.72
15	8	O	Natalia Voronina	Russia	1:55.93	+3.84
16	3	I	Valérie Maltais	Canada	1:55.99	+3.90
17	2	O	Roxanne Dufter	Germany	1:56.64	+4.55
18	6	I	Francesca Lollobrigida	Italy	1:56.92	+4.83
19	3	O	Han Mei	China	1:57.56	+5.47
20	2	I	Karolina Bosiek	Poland	1:58.09	+6.00
21	1	I	Ragne Wiklund	Norway	1:58.64	+6.55
22	1	O	Carlijn Schoutens	United States	2:01.20	+9.11

=== 5000 m ===
The race was started on 3 March at 13:38.

Rank	Pair	Lane	Name	Country	Time	Diff
1	3	I	Martina Sáblíková	Czech Republic	6:42.01 WR	
2	2	I	Isabelle Weidemann	Canada	6:49.68	+7.66
3	2	O	Carlijn Achtereekte	Netherlands	6:50.12	+8.10
4	1	O	Maryna Zuyeva	Belarus	6:53.19	+11.17
5	3	O	Antoinette de Jong	Netherlands	6:56.26	+14.24
6	1	I	Natalia Voronina	Russia	6:59.25	+17.23
7	4	I	Ireen Wüst	Netherlands	6:59.80	+17.78
8	4	O	Miho Takagi	Japan	7:02.72	+20.70

=== Overall standings ===
After all events.

Rank	Name	Country	500m	3000m	1500m	5000m	Points	Diff
1st place, gold medalist(s)	Martina Sáblíková	Czech Republic	39.32	3:53.31	1:53.70	6:42.01	156.306	
2nd place, silver medalist(s)	Miho Takagi	Japan	37.22	4:00.16	1:52.08	7:02.72	156.878	+0.58
3rd place, bronze medalist(s)	Antoinette de Jong	Netherlands	38.52	3:58.25	1:53.96	6:56.26	157.840	+1.54
4	Carlijn Achtereekte	Netherlands	39.25	3:58.70	1:53.93	6:50.12	158.021	+1.72
5	Ireen Wüst	Netherlands	38.46	3:59.79	1:53.48	6:59.80	158.231	+1.93
6	Isabelle Weidemann	Canada	40.34	3:58.51	1:55.22	6:49.68	159.465	+3.16
7	Maryna Zuyeva	Belarus	40.03	3:59.80	1:54.83	6:53.19	159.591	+3.29
8	Natalia Voronina	Russia	39.73	3:59.48	1:55.93	6:59.25	160.211	+3.91
9	Ivanie Blondin	Canada	39.02	4:01.77	1:53.59	—	117.178	—
10	Ida Njåtun	Norway	38.69	4:04.14	1:55.42	—	117.853	—
11	Nana Takagi	Japan	38.67	4:08.18	1:55.40	—	118.499	—
12	Evgeniia Lalenkova	Russia	39.42	4:05.06	1:55.09	—	118.626	—
13	Ayano Sato	Japan	38.99	4:08.13	1:55.56	—	118.865	—
14	Francesca Lollobrigida	Italy	39.06	4:06.11	1:56.92	—	119.051	—
15	Nikola Zdráhalová	Czech Republic	38.91	4:09.24	1:55.81	—	119.053	—
16	Elizaveta Kazelina	Russia	38.86	4:12.08	1:55.73	—	119.449	—
17	Valérie Maltais	Canada	40.42	4:03.20	1:55.99	—	119.616	—
18	Han Mei	China	38.80	4:14.60	1:57.56	—	120.419	—
19	Roxanne Dufter	Germany	40.37	4:08.57	1:56.64	—	120.678	—
20	Karolina Bosiek	Poland	39.57	4:13.28	1:58.09	—	121.146	—
21	Ragne Wiklund	Norway	40.03	4:11.31	1:58.64	—	121.461	—
22	Carlijn Schoutens	United States	41.70	4:10.12	2:01.20	—	123.786	—
	Saskia Alusalu	Estonia	41.38	DSQ	DNS	—		—
	Claudia Pechstein	Germany	DSQ	4:03.96	DNS	—		—
