= 2026 World Allround Speed Skating Championships – Women =

Women at the 2026 World Allround Speed Skating Championships
- Venue: Thialf
- Location: Heerenveen, Netherlands
- Dates: 7–8 March
- Competitors: 24 from 14 nations
- Winning points: 157.457

Medalists
gold medal	Ragne Wiklund	Norway
silver medal	Marijke Groenewoud	Netherlands
bronze medal	Miho Takagi	Japan

The Women competition at the 2026 World Allround Speed Skating Championships was held on 7 and 8 March 2026.

== Results ==
=== 500 m ===
The race was started on 7 March at 13:05.

Rank	Pair	Lane	Name	Country	Time	Diff
1	11	O	Miho Takagi	Japan	37.75	
2	6	O	Antoinette Rijpma-de Jong	Netherlands	38.59	+0.84
3	12	O	Nadezhda Morozova	Kazakhstan	38.72	+0.97
4	11	I	Nikola Zdráhalová	Czech Republic	38.78	+1.03
5	7	O	Ragne Wiklund	Norway	38.84; PB	+1.09
6	4	O	Joy Beune	Netherlands	38.94	+1.19
7	1	O	Ayano Sato	Japan	39.00	+1.25
8	2	O	Han Mei	China	39.22	+1.47
9	8	O	Aurora Grinden Løvås	Norway	39.27; PB	+1.52
10	12	I	Kaitlyn McGregor	Switzerland	39.30	+1.55
11	10	I	Marijke Groenewoud	Netherlands	39.32	+1.57
12	7	I	Park Ji-woo	South Korea	39.33; PB	+1.58
13	10	O	Lea Sophie Scholz	Germany	39.35	+1.60
14	9	I	Francesca Lollobrigida	Italy	39.47	+1.72
15	3	I	Valérie Maltais	Canada	39.50	+1.75
16	4	I	Li Jiaxuan	China	39.80	+2.05
17	8	I	Zofia Braun	Poland	39.96	+2.21
18	5	O	Martina Sáblíková	Czech Republic	40.02	+2.27
19	5	I	Sandrine Tas	Belgium	40.04	+2.29
20	1	I	Tai Zhien	China	40.30; PB	+2.55
20	9	O	Jeannine Rosner	Austria	40.30	+2.55
22	3	O	Josie Hofmann	Germany	40.53; PB	+2.78
23	2	I	Momoka Horikawa	Japan	40.94	+3.19
24	6	I	Laura Hall	Canada	41.79	+4.04

=== 3000 m ===
The race was started on 7 March at 14:22.

Rank	Pair	Lane	Name	Country	Time	Diff
1	10	O	Ragne Wiklund	Norway	3:56.83	
2	12	O	Marijke Groenewoud	Netherlands	3:57.39	+0.56
3	12	I	Joy Beune	Netherlands	4:00.09	+3.26
4	11	O	Francesca Lollobrigida	Italy	4:00.60	+3.77
5	9	I	Sandrine Tas	Belgium	4:02.17	+5.34
6	1	I	Antoinette Rijpma-de Jong	Netherlands	4:03.22	+6.39
7	6	I	Miho Takagi	Japan	4:03.37	+6.54
8	9	O	Jeannine Rosner	Austria	4:04.31	+7.48
9	5	O	Ayano Sato	Japan	4:05.20	+8.37
10	8	I	Nadezhda Morozova	Kazakhstan	4:06.33	+9.50
11	11	I	Valérie Maltais	Canada	4:07.25	+10.42
12	3	O	Aurora Grinden Løvås	Norway	4:07.63	+10.80
13	10	I	Josie Hofmann	Germany	4:08.04	+11.21
14	7	I	Kaitlyn McGregor	Switzerland	4:09.73	+12.90
15	4	O	Han Mei	China	4:10.18	+13.35
16	2	O	Zofia Braun	Poland	4:10.21	+13.38
17	5	I	Nikola Zdráhalová	Czech Republic	4:10.49	+13.66
18	4	I	Tai Zhien	China	4:11.16	+14.33
19	2	I	Laura Hall	Canada	4:11.75	+14.92
20	1	O	Lea Sophie Scholz	Germany	4:11.82; PB	+14.99
21	6	O	Li Jiaxuan	China	4:11.85	+15.02
22	3	I	Park Ji-woo	South Korea	4:15.28	+18.45
23	7	O	Martina Sáblíková	Czech Republic	4:21.72	+24.89
	8	O	Momoka Horikawa	Japan	Did not start	

=== 1500 m ===
The race was started on 8 March at 13:30.

Rank	Pair	Lane	Name	Country	Time	Diff
1	10	O	Joy Beune	Netherlands	1:53.19	
2	11	I	Miho Takagi	Japan	1:53.48	+0.29
3	11	O	Ragne Wiklund	Norway	1:53.83	+0.64
4	10	I	Marijke Groenewoud	Netherlands	1:53.84	+0.65
5	9	I	Antoinette Rijpma-de Jong	Netherlands	1:53.86	+0.67
6	8	I	Nadezhda Morozova	Kazakhstan	1:55.29	+2.10
7	8	O	Ayano Sato	Japan	1:55.46	+2.27
8	5	I	Han Mei	China	1:55.78	+2.59
9	9	O	Francesca Lollobrigida	Italy	1:56.27	+3.08
10	7	O	Nikola Zdráhalová	Czech Republic	1:56.55	+3.36
11	4	O	Lea Sophie Scholz	Germany	1:56.73	+3.54
12	5	O	Kaitlyn McGregor	Switzerland	1:56.83	+3.64
13	6	O	Valérie Maltais	Canada	1:56.94	+3.75
14	7	I	Sandrine Tas	Belgium	1:57.32	+4.13
15	4	I	Jeannine Rosner	Austria	1:57.36	+4.17
16	6	I	Aurora Grinden Løvås	Norway	1:58.26	+5.07
17	3	O	Li Jiaxuan	China	1:58.53	+5.34
18	2	I	Josie Hofmann	Germany	1:58.59	+5.40
19	2	O	Park Ji-woo	South Korea	1:58.65	+5.46
20	3	I	Zofia Braun	Poland	1:59.06	+5.87
21	1	O	Laura Hall	Canada	2:00.19	+7.00
22	1	I	Tai Zhien	China	2:01.97	+8.78

=== 5000 m ===
The race was started on 8 March at 15:16.

Rank	Pair	Lane	Name	Country	Time	Diff
1	4	O	Ragne Wiklund	Norway	6:52.03	
2	3	O	Marijke Groenewoud	Netherlands	6:52.55	+0.52
3	1	I	Francesca Lollobrigida	Italy	6:56.77	+4.74
4	1	O	Sandrine Tas	Belgium	6:57.24	+5.21
5	3	I	Joy Beune	Netherlands	6:57.61	+5.58
6	4	I	Miho Takagi	Japan	7:01.50	+9.47
7	2	O	Nadezhda Morozova	Kazakhstan	7:02.30; PB	+10.27
8	2	I	Antoinette Rijpma-de Jong	Netherlands	7:08.41	+16.38

=== Overall standings ===
After all events.

Rank	Name	Country	500m	3000m	1500m	5000m	Points	Diff
1st place, gold medalist(s)	Ragne Wiklund	Norway	38.84	3:56.83	1:53.83	6:52.03	157.457	
2nd place, silver medalist(s)	Marijke Groenewoud	Netherlands	39.32	3:57.39	1:53.84	6:52.55	158.086	+6.29
3rd place, bronze medalist(s)	Miho Takagi	Japan	37.75	4:03.37	1:53.48	7:01.50	158.287	+8.30
4	Joy Beune	Netherlands	38.94	4:00.09	1:53.19	6:57.61	158.446	+9.89
5	Antoinette Rijpma-de Jong	Netherlands	38.59	4:03.22	1:53.86	7:08.41	159.920	+24.63
6	Francesca Lollobrigida	Italy	39.47	4:00.60	1:56.27	6:56.77	160.003	+25.46
7	Nadezhda Morozova	Kazakhstan	38.72	4:06.33	1:55.29	7:02.30	160.435	+25.46
8	Sandrine Tas	Belgium	40.04	4:02.17	1:57.32	6:57.24	161.231	+37.74
9	Ayano Sato	Japan	39.00	4:05.20	1:55.46	—	118.352	—
10	Nikola Zdráhalová	Czech Republic	38.78	4:10.49	1:56.55	—	119.378	—
11	Han Mei	China	39.22	4:10.18	1:55.78	—	119.509	—
12	Valérie Maltais	Canada	39.50	4:07.25	1:56.94	—	119.688	—
13	Kaitlyn McGregor	Switzerland	39.30	4:09.73	1:56.83	—	119.864	—
14	Aurora Grinden Løvås	Norway	39.27	4:07.63	1:58.26	—	119.961	—
15	Jeannine Rosner	Austria	40.30	4:04.31	1:57.36	—	120.138	—
16	Lea Sophie Scholz	Germany	39.35	4:11.82	1:56.73	—	120.230	—
17	Li Jiaxuan	China	39.80	4:11.85	1:58.53	—	121.285	—
18	Zofia Braun	Poland	39.96	4:10.21	1:59.06	—	121.347	—
19	Josie Hofmann	Germany	40.53	4:08.04	1:58.59	—	121.400	—
20	Park Ji-woo	South Korea	39.33	4:15.28	1:58.65	—	121.426	—
21	Tai Zhien	China	40.30	4:11.16	2:01.97	—	122.816	—
22	Laura Hall	Canada	41.79	4:11.75	2:00.19	—	123.811	—
	Martina Sáblíková	Czech Republic	40.02	4:21.72	DNS	—	—	—
	Momoka Horikawa	Japan	40.94	Did not start		—	—	—
