= 2023 World Single Distances Speed Skating Championships – Women's 3000 metres =

Women's 3000 metres at the 2023 World Single Distances Speed Skating Championships
- Venue: Thialf
- Location: Heerenveen, Netherlands
- Date: 2 March
- Competitors: 20 from 12 nations
- Winning time: 3:56.86

Medalists
gold medal	Ragne Wiklund	Norway
silver medal	Irene Schouten	Netherlands
bronze medal	Martina Sáblíková	Czech Republic

The Women's 3000 metres competition at the 2023 World Single Distances Speed Skating Championships was held on 2 March 2023.

== Results ==
The race was started at 18:20.

Rank	Pair	Lane	Name	Country	Time	Diff
1st place, gold medalist(s)	8	i	Ragne Wiklund	Norway	3:56.86	
2nd place, silver medalist(s)	5	i	Irene Schouten	Netherlands	3:57.40	+0.54
3rd place, bronze medalist(s)	9	o	Martina Sáblíková	Czech Republic	3:58.35	+1.49
4	9	i	Joy Beune	Netherlands	3:59.18	+2.32
5	8	o	Valérie Maltais	Canada	3:59.88	+3.02
6	10	i	Isabelle Weidemann	Canada	4:01.32	+4.46
7	6	i	Antoinette Rijpma-de Jong	Netherlands	4:02.11	+5.25
8	4	o	Momoka Horikawa	Japan	4:02.34	+5.48
9	10	o	Ivanie Blondin	Canada	4:05.44	+8.58
10	7	i	Ayano Sato	Japan	4:06.23	+9.37
11	7	o	Han Mei	China	4:06.78	+9.92
12	5	o	Magdalena Czyszczoń	Poland	4:07.31	+10.45
13	2	o	Sofie Karoline Haugen	Norway	4:09.61	+12.75
14	2	i	Mia Kilburg	United States	4:11.57	+14.71
15	4	i	Yang Binyu	China	4:13.71	+16.85
16	6	o	Nadezhda Morozova	Kazakhstan	4:14.25	+17.39
17	3	i	Sandrine Tas	Belgium	4:14.65	+17.79
18	1	i	Yuna Onodera	Japan	4:15.57	+18.71
19	1	o	Michelle Uhrig	Germany	4:19.15	+22.29
20	3	o	Kaitlyn McGregor	Switzerland	4:19.97	+23.11
