= 2021 World Single Distances Speed Skating Championships – Women's 3000 metres =

Women's 3000 metres at the 2021 World Single Distances Speed Skating Championships
- Venue: Thialf
- Location: Heerenveen, Netherlands
- Date: 11 February
- Competitors: 20 from 10 nations
- Winning time: 3:58.470

Medalists
gold medal	Antoinette de Jong	Netherlands
silver medal	Martina Sáblíková	Czech Republic
bronze medal	Irene Schouten	Netherlands

The Women's 3000 metres competition at the 2021 World Single Distances Speed Skating Championships was held on 11 February 2021.

== Results ==
The race started at 14:40.

Rank	Pair	Lane	Name	Country	Time	Diff
1st place, gold medalist(s)	8	i	Antoinette de Jong	Netherlands	3:58.470	
2nd place, silver medalist(s)	9	i	Martina Sáblíková	Czech Republic	3:58.579	+0.10
3rd place, bronze medalist(s)	10	i	Irene Schouten	Netherlands	3:59.757	+1.28
4	9	o	Ragne Wiklund	Norway	4:00.491	+2.02
5	6	i	Isabelle Weidemann	Canada	4:00.965	+2.49
6	8	o	Joy Beune	Netherlands	4:02.219	+3.74
7	10	o	Natalya Voronina	Russian Skating Union	4:02.858	+4.38
8	6	o	Valérie Maltais	Canada	4:03.008	+4.53
9	5	i	Francesca Lollobrigida	Italy	4:04.372	+5.90
10	7	o	Evgeniia Lalenkova	Russian Skating Union	4:05.056	+6.58
11	5	o	Nadezhda Morozova	Kazakhstan	4:06.738	+8.26
12	7	i	Maryna Zuyeva	Belarus	4:07.564	+9.09
13	3	i	Mareike Thum	Germany	4:08.390	+9.92
14	3	o	Nikola Zdráhalová	Czech Republic	4:09.136	+10.66
15	4	o	Sofie Karoline Haugen	Norway	4:10.773	+12.30
16	2	i	Elena Eranina	Russian Skating Union	4:11.121	+12.65
17	2	o	Magdalena Czyszczoń	Poland	4:11.671	+13.20
18	1	o	Abigail McCluskey	Canada	4:12.252	+13.78
19	1	i	Linda Rossi	Italy	4:12.585	+14.11
20	4	i	Ekaterina Sloeva	Belarus	4:14.975	+16.50
