= List of Kazakhstani records in speed skating =

The following are the national records in speed skating in Kazakhstan maintained by the National Skating Federation of the Republic of Kazakhstan.

== Men ==
Event	Record	Athlete	Date	Meet	Place	Ref
500 meters	33.67	Yevgeniy Koshkin	16 November 2025	World Cup	Salt Lake City, United States	
500 meters × 2	70.04	Roman Krech	10 February 2014	Olympic Games	Sochi, Russia	
1000 meters	1:07.65	Denis Kuzin	12 December 2021	World Cup	Calgary, Canada	
1500 meters	1:43.60	Denis Kuzin	15 November 2013	World Cup	Salt Lake City, United States	
3000 meters	3:40.15	Dmitry Babenko	2 November 2013	Time Trials	Calgary, Canada	
5000 meters	6:16.90	Vitaliy Schigolev	8 February 2020	World Cup	Calgary, Canada	
10000 meters	13.03.94	Dmitry Morozov	16 March 2019	Olympic Oval Finale	Calgary, Canada	
Team sprint (3 laps)	1:20.39	Artur Galiyev; Stanislav Palkin; Alexander Klenko	13 February 2020	World Single Distances Championships	Salt Lake City, United States	
Team pursuit (8 laps)	3:46.20	Nuraly Akzhol; Vitaliy Chshigolev; Dmitry Morozov	27 January 2024	World Cup	Salt Lake City, United States	
Sprint combination	137.050 pts	Roman Krech	25–26 February 2017	World Sprint Championships	Calgary, Canada	
Small combination	152.366 pts	Aleksandr Zhigin	March 2006	Olympic Oval Final	Calgary, Canada	
Big combination	151.059 pts	Dmitry Babenko	March 2006	Olympic Oval Final	Calgary, Canada	

== Women ==
Event	Record	Athlete	Date	Meet	Place	Ref
500 meters	37.25	Kristina Silaeva	26 January 2025	World Cup	Calgary, Canada	
500 meters × 2	76.62	Yekaterina Aydova	14 February 2015	World Single Distance Championships	Heerenveen, Netherlands	
1000 meters	1:13.46	Yekaterina Aydova	4 December 2021	World Cup	Salt Lake City, United States	
1500 meters	1:51.65	Nadezhda Morozova	15 November 2025	World Cup	Salt Lake City, United States	
3000 meters	3:58.03	Nadezhda Morozova	14 November 2025	World Cup	Salt Lake City, United States	
3000 meters	3:58.03	Nadezhda Morozova	21 November 2025	World Cup	Calgary, Canada	
5000 meters	7:02.30	Nadezhda Morozova	8 March 2026	World Allround Championships	Heerenveen, Netherlands	
10000 meters						
Team sprint (3 laps)	1:26.36	Kristina Silaeva; Darya Vazhenina; Nadezhda Morozova	26 January 2025	World Cup	Calgary, Canada	
Team pursuit (6 laps)	2:57.71	Nadezhda Morozova; Arina Ilyachsehenko; Elizaveta Golubeva	23 November 2025	World Cup	Calgary, Canada	
Sprint combination	150.710 pts	Yekaterina Aydova	25–26 February 2017	World Sprint Championships	Calgary, Canada	
Mini combination	165.244 pts	Yekaterina Aydova	28–29 March 2016	Kazakhstan Allround Championships	Astana, Kazakhstan	
Small combination	160.435 pts	Nadezhda Morozova	7–8 March 2026	World Allround Championships	Heerenveen, Netherlands	

== Mixed ==
Event	Record	Athlete	Date	Meet	Place	Ref
Relay	2:58.73	Alexandr Klenko; Arina Ilyachsehenko	23 November 2025	World Cup	Calgary, Canada	
