= Speed skating at the 2022 Winter Olympics – Women's 5000 metres =

Speed skating event at the 2022 Winter Olympics

Women's 5000 metres at the XXIV Olympic Winter Games
- Speed skating
- Venue: National Speed Skating Oval, Beijing
- Date: 10 February 2022
- Competitors: 12 from 10 nations
- Winning time: 6:43.51

Medalists
1st place, gold medalist(s)		Irene Schouten	Netherlands
2nd place, silver medalist(s)		Isabelle Weidemann	Canada
3rd place, bronze medalist(s)		Martina Sáblíková	Czech Republic

The women's 5000 m competition in speed skating at the 2022 Winter Olympics was held on 10 February, at the National Speed Skating Oval ("Ice Ribbon") in Beijing. Irene Schouten of the Netherlands, who already became the champion on 3000 m a few days earlier, won the event. Isabelle Weidemann of Canada won the silver medal, and Martina Sáblíková of the Czech Republic, the 2010 and 2014 Olympic champion at this distance, bronze.

The 2018 champion, Esmee Visser, did not qualify for the Olympics. The 2018 silver medalist, Sáblíková, and the bronze medalist, Natalya Voronina, the world record holder at the start of the Olympics, both qualified. Schouten was the 2021 World Single Distances champion at the 5000 m distance. Voronina and Carlijn Achtereekte were the silver and bronze medalist, respectively. Weidemann was leading the 2021–22 ISU World Cup in long distances with three races completed before the Olympics, followed by Ragne Wiklund, Schouten, and Francesca Lollobrigida. Schouten skated the season best time, 6:45.69 in Heerenveen on 31 October 2021.

Maryna Zuyeva won the first pair and set the lead. Her time was better than the track record, but still 16 seconds above the Olympic record. Voronina has improved her time in pair 3 by 6 seconds. In pair 4, Sáblíková took the lead, improving Voronina's time by 7 seconds, with two pairs to go. Weidemann in pair 5 further improved Sáblíková's time by 2 seconds, but skated still slower than the Olympic record. In the last pair Schouten set a new Olympic record, thereby winning the event.

== Qualification ==
A total of 12 entry quotas were available for the event, with a maximum of two athletes per NOC. The first eight athletes qualified through their performance at the 2021–22 ISU Speed Skating World Cup, while the last four earned quotas by having the best times among athletes not already qualified. A country could only earn the maximum two spots through the World Cup rankings.

The qualification time for the event (7:20.00 or 4:08.00 (3000 m)) was released on 1 July 2021, and was unchanged from 2018. Skaters had the time period of 1 July 2021 to 16 January 2022 to achieve qualification times at valid International Skating Union (ISU) events.

== Records ==
Prior to this competition, the existing world, Olympic and track records were as follows.

World record	Natalya Voronina (RUS)	6:39.02	Salt Lake City, United States	15 February 2020
Olympic record	Claudia Pechstein (GER)	6:46.91	Salt Lake City, United States	23 February 2002
Track record	Chen Xiangyu (CHN)	7:28.04		8 April 2021

A new Olympic record was set in the competition.

Date	Round	Athlete	Country	Time	Record
10 February	Pair 6	Irene Schouten	Netherlands	6:43.51	OR, TR

== Results ==
The races were started at 20:00.

Rank	Pair	Lane	Name	Country	Time	Time behind	Notes
1st place, gold medalist(s)	6	I	Irene Schouten	Netherlands	6:43.51		OR, NR
2nd place, silver medalist(s)	5	I	Isabelle Weidemann	Canada	6:48.18	+4.67	
3rd place, bronze medalist(s)	4	I	Martina Sáblíková	Czech Republic	6:50.09	+6.58	
4	6	O	Francesca Lollobrigida	Italy	6:51.76	+8.25	NR
5	5	O	Ragne Wiklund	Norway	6:56.34	+12.83	
6	3	O	Natalya Voronina	ROC	6:56.99	+13.48	
7	3	I	Sanne in 't Hof	Netherlands	6:59.77	+16.26	
8	4	O	Misaki Oshigiri	Japan	7:01.17	+17.66	
9	1	O	Maryna Zuyeva	Belarus	7:02.91	+19.40	
10	1	I	Momoka Horikawa	Japan	7:06.92	+23.41	
11	2	I	Han Mei	China	7:08.37	+24.86	
12	2	O	Magdalena Czyszczoń	Poland	7:21.49	+37.98	
