= 2017 World Single Distances Speed Skating Championships – Women's 5000 metres =

Women's 5000 metres at the 2017 World Single Distances Speed Skating Championships
- Venue: Gangneung Oval
- Location: Gangneung, South Korea
- Dates: 11 February
- Competitors: 12 from 8 nations
- Winning time: 6:52.38

Medalists
gold medal	Martina Sáblíková	Czech Republic
silver medal	Claudia Pechstein	Germany
bronze medal	Ivanie Blondin	Canada

The Women's 5000 metres competition at the 2017 World Single Distances Speed Skating Championships was held on 11 February 2017.

== Results ==
The race was started at 17:30.

Rank	Pair	Lane	Name	Country	Time	Diff
1st place, gold medalist(s)	6	o	Martina Sáblíková	Czech Republic	6:52.38	
2nd place, silver medalist(s)	5	o	Claudia Pechstein	Germany	6:53.93	+1.55
3rd place, bronze medalist(s)	5	i	Ivanie Blondin	Canada	6:57.14	+4.76
4	4	i	Anna Yurakova	Russia	6:57.27	+4.89
5	4	o	Antoinette de Jong	Netherlands	6:59.33	+6.95
6	2	i	Isabelle Weidemann	Canada	6:59.75	+7.37
7	2	o	Carien Kleibeuker	Netherlands	6:59.79	+7.41
8	6	i	Bente Kraus	Germany	7:00.62	+8.24
9	3	i	Natalya Voronina	Russia	7:02.94	+10.56
10	1	o	Marina Zueva	Belarus	7:03.40	+11.02
11	3	o	Mia Manganello	United States	7:10.77	+18.39
12	1	i	Jelena Peeters	Belgium	7:14.68	+22.30
