= 2016 World Single Distances Speed Skating Championships – Women's 3000 metres =

Women's 3000 metres at the 2016 World Single Distances Speed Skating Championships
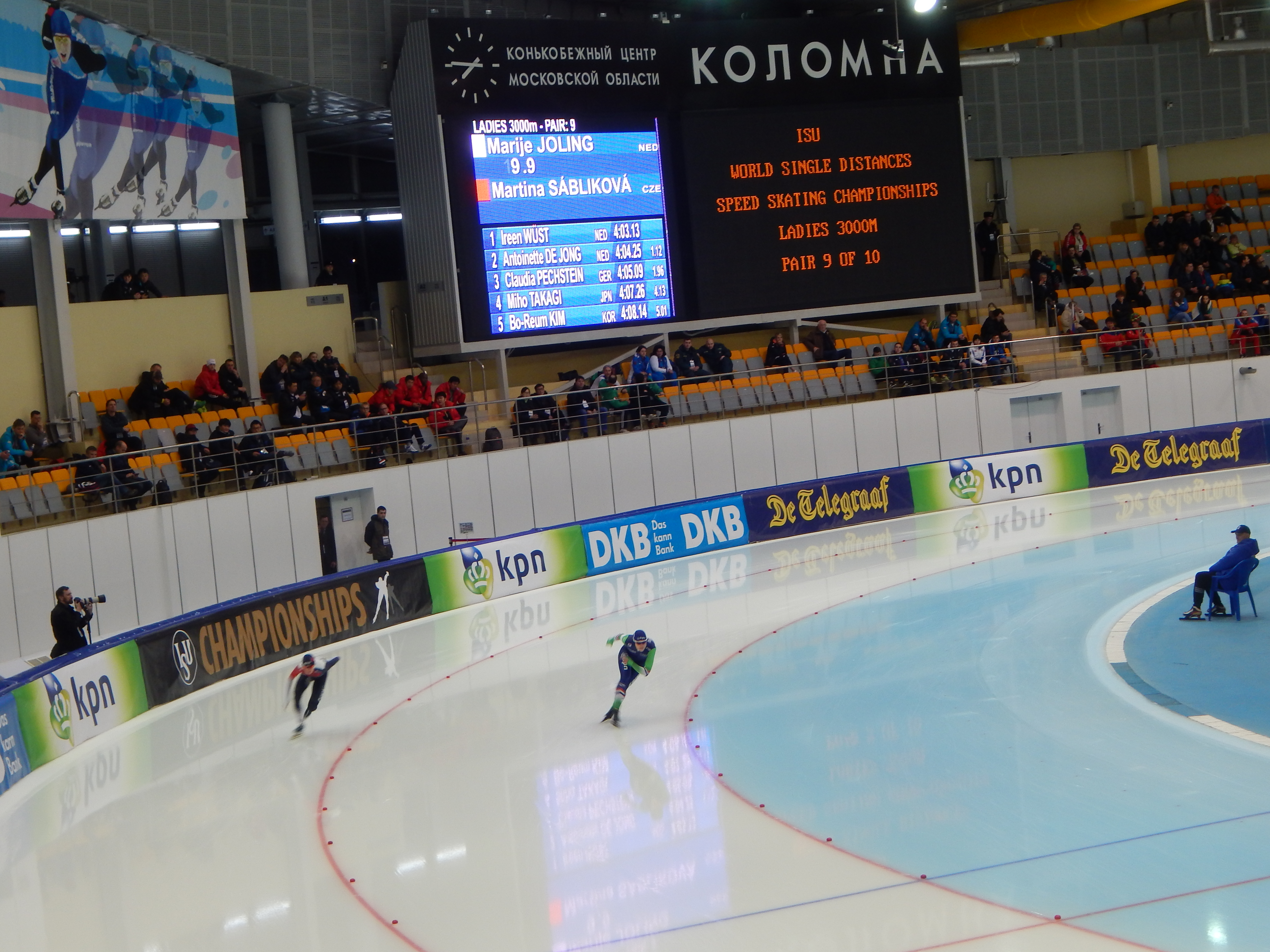
- Pair 9
- Venue: Kolomna Speed Skating Center, Kolomna
- Date: 11 February
- Competitors: 20 from 11 nations
- Winning time: 4:03.05

Medalists
gold medal	Martina Sáblíková	Czech Republic
silver medal	Ireen Wüst	Netherlands
bronze medal	Antoinette de Jong	Netherlands

The Women's 3000 metres race of the 2016 World Single Distances Speed Skating Championships was held on 11 February 2016.

== Results ==
The race was started at 19:00.

Rank	Pair	Lane	Name	Country	Time	Diff
1st place, gold medalist(s)	9	o	Martina Sáblíková	CZE	4:03.05	
2nd place, silver medalist(s)	2	o	Ireen Wüst	NED	4:03.13	+0.08
3rd place, bronze medalist(s)	1	i	Antoinette de Jong	NED	4:04.25	+1.20
4	8	i	Claudia Pechstein	GER	4:05.09	+2.04
5	9	i	Marije Joling	NED	4:06.62	+3.57
6	8	o	Miho Takagi	JPN	4:07.26	+4.21
7	3	i	Kim Bo-reum	KOR	4:08.14	+5.09
8	10	o	Olga Graf	RUS	4:09.10	+6.05
9	3	o	Bente Kraus	GER	4:09.19	+6.14
10	6	i	Isabelle Weidemann	CAN	4:09.72	+6.67
11	5	i	Anna Yurakova	RUS	4:10.20	+7.15
12	10	i	Natalya Voronina	RUS	4:10.57	+7.52
13	1	o	Luiza Złotkowska	POL	4:11.52	+8.47
14	7	o	Misaki Oshigiri	JPN	4:11.84	+8.79
15	4	o	Francesca Lollobrigida	ITA	4:13.28	+10.23
16	5	o	Fuyo Matsuoka	JPN	4:13.65	+10.60
17	7	i	Ivanie Blondin	CAN	4:15.52	+12.47
18	2	i	Zhao Xin	CHN	4:16.80	+13.75
19	4	i	Marina Zueva	BLR	4:18.16	+15.11
20	6	o	Stephanie Beckert	GER	4:20.23	+17.18
