= 2014 KNSB Dutch Single Distance Championships – Women's 5000 m =

Dutch Championships: Speed Skating (2013, Netherlands)

- Venue: Thialf, Heerenveen, Netherlands
- Date: 27 October 2013
- Competitors: 10 skaters

Medalist men
1st place, gold medalist(s)		Yvonne Nauta	NED
2nd place, silver medalist(s)		Carien Kleibeuker	NED
3rd place, bronze medalist(s)		Antoinette de Jong	NED

The women's 5000 meter at the 2014 KNSB Dutch Single Distance Championships took place in Heerenveen at the Thialf ice skating rink on Sunday 27 October 2013. Although this tournament was held in 2013, it was part of the 2013–2014 speed skating season.

There were 10 participants. There was a qualification selection incentive for the next following 2013–14 ISU Speed Skating World Cup tournaments.

Title holder was Marije Joling.

== Overview ==
=== Result ===
Rank	Skater	Time
1st place, gold medalist(s)	Yvonne Nauta	7:01.62 PR
2nd place, silver medalist(s)	Carien Kleibeuker	7:04.02
3rd place, bronze medalist(s)	Antoinette de Jong	7:06.09 PR
4	Annouk van der Weijden	7:08.58
5	Carlijn Achtereekte	7:09.07 PR
6	Rixt Meijer	7:09.52
7	Pien Keulstra	7:09.87
8	Linda de Vries	7:10.15
9	Lisa van der Geest	7:12.56 PR
10	Diane Valkenburg	7:13.12

=== Draw ===
Heat	Inner lane	Outer lane
1	Pien Keulstra	Lisa van der Geest
2	Rixt Meijer	Yvonne Nauta
3	Annouk van der Weijden	Carlijn Achtereekte
4	Antoinette de Jong	Carien Kleibeuker
5	Linda de Vries	Diane Valkenburg
