= World record progression 2x500 m speed skating men =

The world record progression of the 2 times 500 meter men as recognised by the International Skating Union:

Some international skating events, such as World Single Distance Championships and World Cups, may include two races of 500 meters. A world record will be registered by ISU for the combined result of the two 500 meter races, only from competitions where the final result of the 500m is determined by the total time after 2 races.

Nr	Nation	Names	Result	Date	Venue	Meeting
1	JAP	Hiroyasu Shimizu	1:08.96	10 March 2001	Salt Lake City	World Championship
2	South Korea	Lee Kang-seok	1:08.69	9 March 2007	Salt Lake City	World Championship
3	CAN	Jeremy Wotherspoon	1:08.31	15 March 2008	Calgary	Olympic Oval Final
4	NED	Ronald Mulder	1:08.26	26 February 2017	Calgary	World Championship
5*	JAP	Tatsuya Shinhama	1.07:63	10 March 2019	Salt Lake City	World Cup
6	NED	Jenning de Boo	1:08.22	14 February 2025	Heerenveen	Dutch Single Distances Championships

*Fastest double 500 meter recorded by ISU in one event but not listed as a world record.
