= 2025 World Single Distances Speed Skating Championships – Women's 1500 metres =

Women's 1500 metres at the 2025 World Single Distances Speed Skating Championships
- Venue: Vikingskipet
- Location: Hamar, Norway
- Dates: 16 March
- Competitors: 24 from 12 nations
- Winning time: 1:55.28

Medalists
gold medal	Joy Beune	Netherlands
silver medal	Antoinette Rijpma-de Jong	Netherlands
bronze medal	Han Mei	China

The Women's 1500 metres competition at the 2025 World Single Distances Speed Skating Championships took place on 16 March 2025.

== Qualification ==
A total of 24 entry quotas were available for the event, with a maximum of three per country. The entry quotas were assigned to countries following a Special Qualification Ranking List based on rankings and performances of skaters during the 2024–25 ISU Speed Skating World Cup.

== Records ==
Prior to this competition, the existing world and track records were as follows.

	Time	Athlete	Date
World Record	1:49.83	Miho Takagi (JPN)	10 March 2019
Track Record	1:53.89	Ireen Wüst (NED)	1 March 2020

== Results ==
The race was started at 12:56.

Rank	Pair	Lane	Name	Country	Time	Diff
1st place, gold medalist(s)	11	o	Joy Beune	Netherlands	1:55.28	
2nd place, silver medalist(s)	8	i	Antoinette Rijpma-de Jong	Netherlands	1:55.50	+0.22
3rd place, bronze medalist(s)	10	i	Han Mei	China	1:55.53	+0.25
4	12	i	Miho Takagi	Japan	1:55.71	+0.43
5	6	o	Nikola Zdráhalova	Czech Republic	1:55.99	+0.71
6	10	o	Marijke Groenewoud	Netherlands	1:56.26	+0.98
7	9	i	Ragne Wiklund	Norway	1:56.27	+0.99
8	8	o	Ivanie Blondin	Canada	1:56.31	+1.03
9	11	i	Francesca Lollobrigida	Italy	1:56.90	+1.62
10	12	o	Brittany Bowe	United States	1:57.18	+1.90
11	6	i	Yin Qi	China	1:57.50	+2.22
12	4	i	Natalia Jabrzyk	Poland	1:57.73	+2.45
13	7	i	Valerie Maltais	Canada	1:58.17	+2.89
14	9	o	Isabelle van Elst	Belgium	1:58.24	+2.96
15	5	i	Ayano Sato	Japan	1:59.13	+3.85
16	7	o	Yang Binyu	China	1:59.19	+3.91
17	5	o	Momoka Horikawa	Japan	2:00.48	+5.20
18	3	o	Marlen Ehseluns	Germany	2:01.04	+5.76
19	3	i	Sofia Thorup-Prosvirnova	Denmark	2:01.24	+5.96
20	4	o	Greta Myers	United States	2:01.41	+6.13
21	1	o	Josie Hofmann	Germany	2:01.74	+6.46
22	2	i	Mia Manganello	United States	2:02.12	+6.84
23	1	i	Laura Hall	Canada	2:03.57	+8.29
24	2	o	Lucie Korvasová	Czech Republic	2:06.09	+10.81
