= 2023 World Single Distances Speed Skating Championships – Women's 1500 metres =

Women's 1500 metres at the 2023 World Single Distances Speed Skating Championships
- Venue: Thialf
- Location: Heerenveen, Netherlands
- Date: 5 March
- Competitors: 23 from 13 nations
- Winning time: 1:53.54

Medalists
gold medal	Antoinette Rijpma-de Jong	Netherlands
silver medal	Ragne Wiklund	Norway
bronze medal	Miho Takagi	Japan

The Women's 1500 metres competition at the 2023 World Single Distances Speed Skating Championships was held on 5 March 2023.

== Results ==
The race was started at 13:45.

Rank	Pair	Lane	Name	Country	Time	Diff
1st place, gold medalist(s)	11	o	Antoinette Rijpma-de Jong	Netherlands	1:53.54	
2nd place, silver medalist(s)	10	o	Ragne Wiklund	Norway	1:54.30	+0.76
3rd place, bronze medalist(s)	12	o	Miho Takagi	Japan	1:54.39	+0.85
4	11	i	Ivanie Blondin	Canada	1:54.71	+1.17
5	12	i	Marijke Groenewoud	Netherlands	1:55.10	+1.56
6	9	i	Kimi Goetz	United States	1:55.26	+1.72
7	6	o	Jutta Leerdam	Netherlands	1:55.32	+1.78
8	7	o	Han Mei	China	1:55.62	+2.07
9	4	o	Brittany Bowe	United States	1:55.67	+2.13
10	8	o	Ayano Sato	Japan	1:55.76	+2.22
11	4	i	Ellia Smeding	Great Britain	1:56.38	+2.84
12	5	i	Béatrice Lamarche	Canada	1:58.49	+4.95
13	8	i	Yekaterina Aydova	Kazakhstan	1:58.54	+5.00
14	7	i	Karolina Bosiek	Poland	1:59.01	+5.47
15	2	i	Yang Binyu	China	1:59.17	+5.63
16	1	o	Maddison Pearman	Canada	1:59.71	+6.17
17	2	o	Mia Kilburg	United States	1:59.96	+6.42
18	6	i	Kaitlyn McGregor	Switzerland	2:00.01	+6.47
19	9	o	Yuna Onodera	Japan	2:00.17	+6.63
20	3	o	Laura Peveri	Italy	2:00.19	+6.65
21	1	i	Alina Dauranova	Kazakhstan	2:01.36	+7.82
22	5	o	Sandrine Tas	Belgium	2:01.42	+7.88
23	3	i	Lea Sophie Scholz	Germany	2:02.20	+8.66
—	10	i	Li Qishi	China	Withdrawn	
