= 2016 World Single Distances Speed Skating Championships – Women's 5000 metres =

Women's 5000 metres at the 2016 World Single Distances Speed Skating Championships
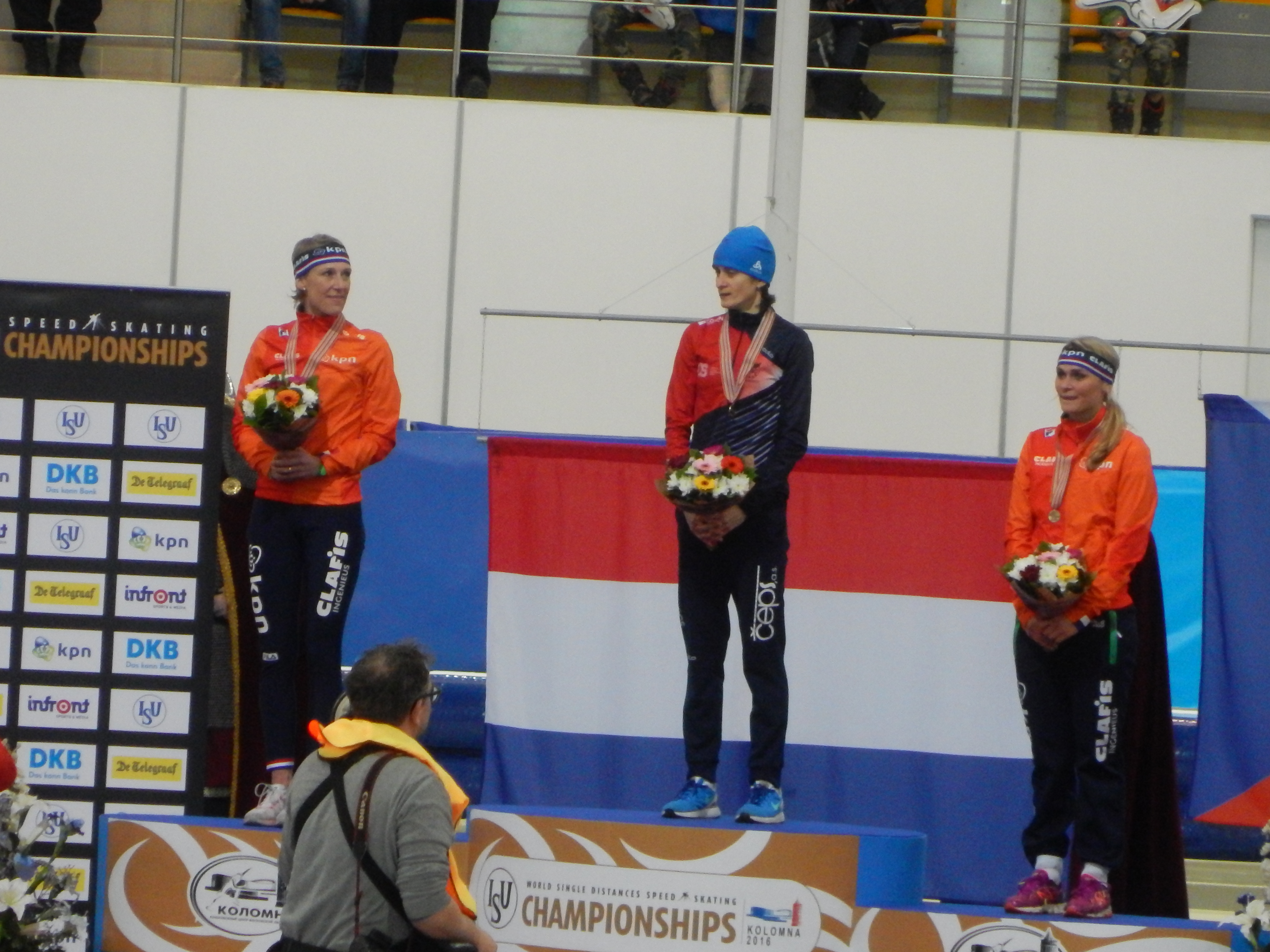
- Victory Ceremony
- Venue: Kolomna Speed Skating Center, Kolomna
- Date: 12 February
- Competitors: 12 from 7 nations
- Winning time: 6:51.09

Medalists
gold medal	Martina Sáblíková	Czech Republic
silver medal	Carien Kleibeuker	Netherlands
bronze medal	Irene Schouten	Netherlands

The Women's 5000 metres race of the 2016 World Single Distances Speed Skating Championships was held on 12 February 2016.

== Results ==
The race was started at 19:05.

Rank	Pair	Lane	Name	Country	Time	Diff
1st place, gold medalist(s)	6	o	Martina Sáblíková	CZE	6:51.09	
2nd place, silver medalist(s)	5	o	Carien Kleibeuker	NED	6:54.96	+3.87
3rd place, bronze medalist(s)	6	i	Irene Schouten	NED	6:55.93	+4.84
4	3	o	Claudia Pechstein	GER	6:58.99	+7.90
5	2	o	Isabelle Weidemann	CAN	7:08.35	+17.26
6	4	i	Anna Yurakova	RUS	7:08.84	+17.75
7	1	i	Bente Kraus	GER	7:09.47	+18.38
8	5	i	Natalya Voronina	RUS	7:11.95	+20.86
9	2	i	Fuyo Matsuoka	JPN	7:14.41	+23.32
10	1	o	Nana Takagi	JPN	7:15.51	+24.42
11	3	i	Jelena Peeters	BEL	7:17.88	+26.79
12	4	o	Josie Spence	CAN	7:29.17	+38.08
