= 2017 World Single Distances Speed Skating Championships – Women's 3000 metres =

Women's 3000 metres at the 2017 World Single Distances Speed Skating Championships
- Venue: Gangneung Oval
- Location: Gangneung, South Korea
- Dates: 9 February
- Competitors: 20 from 12 nations
- Winning time: 3:59.05

Medalists
| gold medal | Ireen Wüst | Netherlands |
| silver medal | Martina Sáblíková | Czech Republic |
| bronze medal | Antoinette de Jong | Netherlands |

The Women's 3000 metres competition at the 2017 World Single Distances Speed Skating Championships was held on 9 February 2017.

== Results ==
The race started at 17:15.

| Rank | Pair | Lane | Name | Country | Time | Diff |
|---|---|---|---|---|---|---|
| 1st place, gold medalist(s) | 5 | o | Ireen Wüst | Netherlands | 3:59.05 | |
| 2nd place, silver medalist(s) | 8 | o | Martina Sáblíková | Czech Republic | 3:59.65 | +0.60 |
| 3rd place, bronze medalist(s) | 9 | o | Antoinette de Jong | Netherlands | 4:01.99 | +2.94 |
| 4 | 8 | i | Ivanie Blondin | Canada | 4:02.45 | +3.40 |
| 5 | 1 | o | Yvonne Nauta | Netherlands | 4:02.56 | +3.51 |
| 6 | 6 | i | Kim Bo-reum | South Korea | 4:03.85 | +4.80 |
| 7 | 7 | o | Olga Graf | Russia | 4:04.45 | +5.40 |
| 8 | 10 | o | Miho Takagi | Japan | 4:04.50 | +5.45 |
| 9 | 7 | i | Isabelle Weidemann | Canada | 4:04.54 | +5.49 |
| 10 | 5 | i | Natalya Voronina | Russia | 4:05.00 | +5.95 |
| 11 | 9 | i | Anna Yurakova | Russia | 4:05.12 | +6.07 |
| 12 | 10 | i | Bente Kraus | Germany | 4:05.38 | +6.33 |
| 13 | 4 | i | Mia Manganello | United States | 4:05.48 | +6.43 |
| 14 | 4 | o | Maryna Zuyeva | Belarus | 4:06.24 | +7.19 |
| 15 | 1 | i | Ayano Sato | Japan | 4:08.23 | +9.18 |
| 16 | 2 | i | Stephanie Beckert | Germany | 4:09.13 | +10.08 |
| 17 | 3 | o | Katarzyna Woźniak | Poland | 4:10.23 | +11.18 |
| 18 | 3 | i | Nikola Zdráhalová | Czech Republic | 4:10.46 | +11.41 |
| 19 | 6 | o | Francesca Lollobrigida | Italy | 4:10.58 | +11.53 |
| 20 | 2 | o | Jelena Peeters | Belgium | 4:12.51 | +13.46 |
