= 2019 World Single Distances Speed Skating Championships – Women's 3000 metres =

Women's 3000 metres at the 2019 World Single Distances Speed Skating Championships
- Venue: Max Aicher Arena
- Location: Inzell, Germany
- Dates: 7 February
- Competitors: 20 from 12 nations
- Winning time: 3:58.91

Medalists
gold medal	Martina Sáblíková	Czech Republic
silver medal	Antoinette de Jong	Netherlands
bronze medal	Natalya Voronina	Russia

The Women's 3000 metres competition at the 2019 World Single Distances Speed Skating Championships was held on 7 February 2019.

== Results ==
The race was started at 16:45.

Rank	Pair	Lane	Name	Country	Time	Diff
1st place, gold medalist(s)	10	i	Martina Sáblíková	Czech Republic	3:58.91	
2nd place, silver medalist(s)	7	i	Antoinette de Jong	Netherlands	3:59.41	+0.50
3rd place, bronze medalist(s)	8	o	Natalya Voronina	Russia	3:59.99	+1.08
4	3	i	Carlijn Achtereekte	Netherlands	4:00.47	+1.56
5	2	o	Ireen Wüst	Netherlands	4:01.45	+2.54
6	6	o	Miho Takagi	Japan	4:02.17	+3.26
7	9	i	Isabelle Weidemann	Canada	4:03.49	+4.58
8	6	i	Evgeniia Lalenkova	Russia	4:03.57	+4.66
9	10	o	Maryna Zuyeva	Belarus	4:05.39	+6.48
10	5	o	Elena Sokhryakova	Russia	4:06.48	+7.57
11	8	i	Francesca Lollobrigida	Italy	4:06.95	+8.04
12	4	o	Valérie Maltais	Canada	4:06.98	+8.07
13	7	o	Ayano Sato	Japan	4:07.40	+8.49
14	2	i	Han Mei	China	4:08.47	+9.56
15	3	o	Roxanne Dufter	Germany	4:09.07	+10.16
16	4	i	Nana Takagi	Japan	4:10.46	+11.55
17	1	i	Karolina Bosiek	Poland	4:14.91	+16.00
18	5	i	Saskia Alusalu	Estonia	4:16.22	+17.31
19	1	o	Sofie Karoline Haugen	Norway	4:23.71	+24.80
—	9	o	Ivanie Blondin	Canada	Disqualified	
