= Antoinette Rijpma-de Jong =

Dutch speed skater (born 1995)

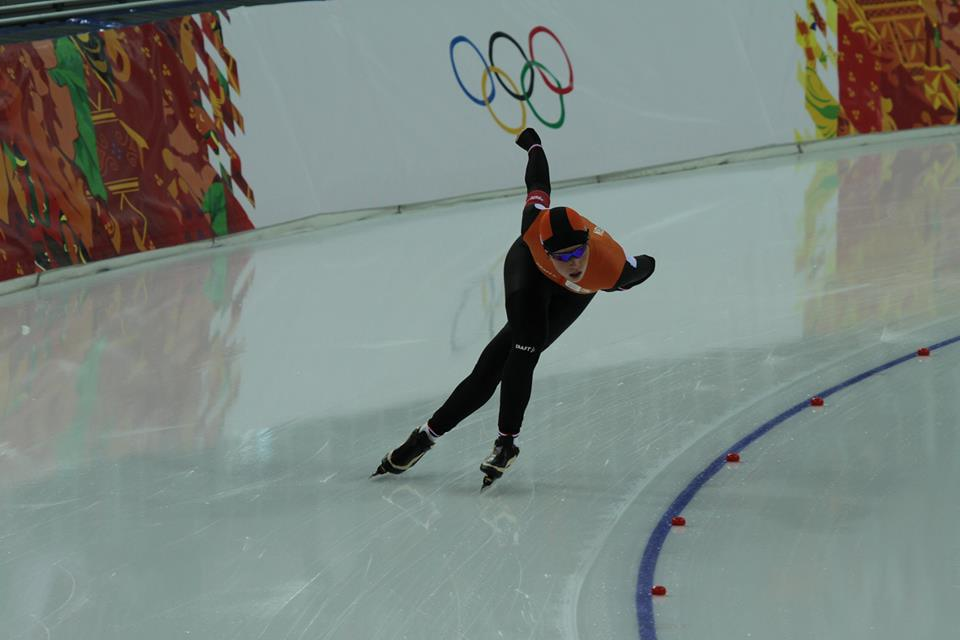
- De Jong at the 2014 Winter Olympics

Personal information
- Nationality: Dutch
- Born: Antoinette de Jong; 6 April 1995 (age 31) Rottum, Netherlands
- Height: 1.73 m (5 ft 8 in)
- Weight: 68 kg (150 lb)
- Spouse: Coen Rijpma (m. 2022)

Sport
- Country: Netherlands
- Sport: Speed skating
- Event(s): 1000 m, 1500 m, 3000 m
- Club: Team Reggeborgh
Medal record
Women's speed skating
Representing the Netherlands
Olympic Games
Gold medal – first place	2026 Milano Cortina	1500 m
Silver medal – second place	2018 Pyeongchang	Team pursuit
Silver medal – second place	2026 Milano Cortina	Team pursuit
Bronze medal – third place	2018 Pyeongchang	3000 m
Bronze medal – third place	2022 Beijing	1500 m
Bronze medal – third place	2022 Beijing	Team pursuit
World Single Distance Championships
Gold medal – first place	2016 Kolomna	Team pursuit
Gold medal – first place	2017 Gangneung	Team pursuit
Gold medal – first place	2021 Heerenveen	3000 m
Gold medal – first place	2021 Heerenveen	Team pursuit
Gold medal – first place	2023 Heerenveen	1500 m
Gold medal – first place	2025 Hamar	Team pursuit
Silver medal – second place	2019 Inzell	3000 m
Silver medal – second place	2019 Inzell	Team pursuit
Silver medal – second place	2020 Salt Lake City	Team pursuit
Silver medal – second place	2023 Heerenveen	1000 m
Silver medal – second place	2025 Hamar	1500 m
Bronze medal – third place	2016 Kolomna	3000 m
Bronze medal – third place	2017 Gangneung	3000 m
World Allround Championships
Bronze medal – third place	2016 Berlin	Allround
Bronze medal – third place	2019 Calgary	Allround
Bronze medal – third place	2020 Hamar	Allround
Bronze medal – third place	2022 Hamar	Allround
Bronze medal – third place	2024 Inzell	Allround
European Championships
Gold medal – first place	2019 Collalbo	Allround
Gold medal – first place	2020 Heerenveen	Team pursuit
Gold medal – first place	2021 Heerenveen	Allround
Gold medal – first place	2022 Heerenveen	1500 m
Gold medal – first place	2022 Heerenveen	Team pursuit
Gold medal – first place	2023 Hamar	Allround
Gold medal – first place	2024 Heerenveen	1500 m
Gold medal – first place	2024 Heerenveen	Team sprint
Gold medal – first place	2025 Heerenveen	Allround
Silver medal – second place	2022 Heerenveen	3000 m
Silver medal – second place	2024 Heerenveen	1000 m
Bronze medal – third place	2016 Minsk	Allround
Bronze medal – third place	2017 Heerenveen	Allround

Antoinette Rijpma-de Jong (Dutch pronunciation: [ɑntʋaːˈnɛtə ˈrɛipmaː də ˈjɔŋ]; née de Jong; born 6 April 1995) is a Dutch speed skater. She has won a gold medal in the 1500 m and a silver medal in the team pursuit at the 2026 Winter Olympics in Milan, Italy, a bronze medal in the 1500 m and a bronze medal in the team pursuit at the 2022 Winter Olympics in Beijing, China, and a bronze medal in the 3000 m at the 2018 Winter Olympics in Pyeongchang, South Korea. She also competed at the 2014 Winter Olympics in Sochi, where she placed seventh in 3000 meters. She is the world record holder of 3000 meters in juniors.

== Personal records ==
Personal records
Speed skating
Event	Result	Date	Location	Notes
500 m	38.22	24 February 2024	Thialf, Heerenveen	
1000 m	1:13.61	18 December 2022	Olympic Oval, Calgary	
1500 m	1:51.71	15 November 2025	Utah Olympic Oval, Salt Lake City	
3000 m	3:55.19	3 December 2021	Utah Olympic Oval, Salt Lake City	
5000 m	6:56.26	3 March 2019	Olympic Oval, Calgary	

She is currently in 7th position in the adelskalender with a points total of 156.444.

== World records ==
=== World records ===
World records
Speed skating
Event	Result	Date	Location	Notes
3000 m jr.	4:00.56	8 November 2013	Utah Olympic Oval, Salt Lake City	World record for juniors until beaten by herself on 15 November 2013.
3000 m jr.	3:59.49	15 November 2013	Olympic Oval, Calgary	World record for juniors until beaten by Joy Beune on 10 March 2018.

== Tournament overview ==
Season	Dutch Championships Single Distances	Dutch Championships Sprint	Dutch Championships Allround	European Championships Allround	European Championships Single Distances	World Championships Allround	World Championships Single Distances	Olympic Games	World Cup GWC	Dutch Championships Juniors	World Championships Juniors
2008–09										Junior C. 15th 500m 10th 1500m 9th overall	
2009–10										Junior C. (bronze) 500m (gold) 1500m (gold) overall	
2010–11										Junior B. (gold) 500m (silver) 1500m (bronze) 1000m (silver) 3000m (gold) overall	
2011–12	HEERENVEEN 14th 500m 13th 1500m	HEERENVEEN 16th 500m 13th 1000m 15th 500m 16th 1000m 16th overall	HEERENVEEN 8th 500m 10th 3000m 7th 1500m 9th 5000m 10th overall								OBIHIRO 5th 500m 6th 1500m 4th 1000m 5th 3000m 5th overall DNF team Pursuit
2012–13	HEERENVEEN 11th 1000m 7th 1500m 5th 3000m 8th 5000m		HEERENVEEN 5th 500m 7th 3000m 6th 1500m 5th 5000m 5th overall	HEERENVEEN (bronze) 500m 8th 3000m 6th 1500m 5th 5000m 5th overall						Junior A. (gold) 500m (gold) 1500m (gold) 1000m (gold) 3000m (gold) overall	COLLALBO 4th 500m (bronze) 1500m (bronze) 1000m (gold) 3000m (silver) overall (bronze) team Pursuit
2013–14	HEERENVEEN 8th 1000m 8th 1500m (bronze) 3000m (bronze) 5000m							SOCHI 7th 3000m			BJUGN (silver) 500m (silver) 150m (gold) 1000m (gold) 3000m (gold) overall (gold) team Pursuit
2014–15	HEERENVEEN 16th 1000m (bronze) 1500m 12th 3000m 7th 5000m		HEERENVEEN 10th 500m 8th 3000m 15th 1500m DNQ 5000m NC9th overall								
2015–16	HEERENVEEN 5th 1500m (silver) 3000m 4th 5000m		HEERENVEEN (gold) 500m (silver) 3000m (silver) 1500m (silver) 5000m (gold) overall	MINSK (silver) 500m 4th 3000m 4th 1500m 5th 5000m (bronze) overall		BERLIN 5th 500m (bronze) 3000m 4th 1500m (bronze) 5000m (bronze) overall	HEERENVEEN (bronze) 3000m (gold) team Pursuit				
2016–17	HEERENVEEN 6th 1500m (silver) 3000m (silver) 5000m			HEERENVEEN (silver) 500m (bronze) 3000m (silver) 1500m 4th 5000m (bronze) overall		HAMAR 7th 500m (bronze) 3000m 5th 1500m (bronze) 5000m 4th overall	KOLOMNA (bronze) 3000m 5th 5000m (gold) team Pursuit				
2017–18	HEERENVEEN 4th 1500m (gold) 3000m (gold) 5000m					AMSTERDAM 4th 500m 5th 3000m 6th 1500m 5th 5000m 4th overall		GANGNEUNG (bronze) 3000m (silver) team Pursuit			
2018–19	HEERENVEEN (silver) 1000m (silver) 1500m (gold) 3000m 4th 5000m			COLLALBO (gold) 500m (gold) 3000m (gold) 1500m (silver) 5000m (gold) overall		CALGARY (bronze) 500m (silver) 3000m 6th 1500m 5th 5000m (bronze) overall	INZELL 5th 1500m (silver) 3000m (silver) team Pursuit				
2019–20	HEERENVEEN 9th 1000m 4th 1500m 4th 3000m		HEERENVEEN (gold) 500m (gold) 3000m (silver) 1500m (silver) 5000m (gold) overall		HEERENVEEN (bronze) team pursuit	HAMAR 12th 500m 5th 3000m 4th 1500m (bronze) 5000m (bronze) overall	SALT LAKE CITY (silver) team Pursuit		34th 1000m 5th 1500m 5th 3000m/5000m (bronze) team Pursuit		
2020–21	HEERENVEEN 9th 1000m (silver) 1500m (bronze) 3000m 7th 5000m		HEERENVEEN (silver) 500m (silver) 3000m (gold) 1500m (bronze) 5000m (gold) overall	HEERENVEEN (bronze) 500m (bronze) 3000m (gold) 1500m (bronze) 5000m (gold) overall			HEERENVEEN 4th 1500m (gold) 3000m (gold) team pursuit		(silver) 1500m (silver) 3000m/5000m (silver) team Pursuit		
2021–22	HEERENVEEN 5th 1000m (gold) 1500m (silver) 3000m				HEERENVEEN (gold) 1500 m (silver) 3000 m (gold) team pursuit	HAMAR 5th 500m (silver) 3000m (silver) 1500m 5th 5000m (bronze) overall		BEIJING (bronze) 1500m 8th 3000m (bronze) team pursuit	32nd 1000m 5th 1500m 15th 3000m/5000m (bronze) team pursuit		
2022–23	HEERENVEEN (silver) 1000m (gold) 1500m (gold) 3000m		HEERENVEEN (gold) 500m (silver) 3000m (gold) 1500m (bronze) 5000m (gold) overall	HAMAR (gold) 500m (silver) 3000m (gold) 1500m (bronze) 5000m (gold) overall			HEERENVEEN (silver) 1000m (gold) 1500m 7th 3000m		7th 1000m (bronze) 1500m 13th 3000m/5000m (silver) team pursuit		
2023–24	HEERENVEEN (silver) 1000m (bronze) 1500m 5th 3000m		HEERENVEEN (gold) 500m (silver) 3000m (gold) 1500m (silver) 5000m (gold) overall		HEERENVEEN (silver) 1000 m (gold) 1500 m (gold) team sprint	INZELL 4th 500m 5th 3000m (bronze) 1500m 5th 5000m (bronze) overall			11th 1000m 7th 1500m 35th 3000m/5000m (gold) team sprint		
2024–25	HEERENVEEN (bronze) 1000m (bronze) 1500m		HEERENVEEN 6th 500m (silver) 3000m (gold) 1500m 4th 5000m (bronze) overall	HEERENVEEN (gold) 500m 5th 3000m (silver) 1500m 5th 5000m (gold) overall			HAMAR 5th 1000m (silver) 1500m (gold) team pursuit		6th 1000m 9th 1500m (gold) team pursuit		
2024–25	HEERENVEEN 5th 1000m (silver) 1500m							MILANO (gold) 1500m (silver) team pursuit			

== Personal life ==
In 2019, De Jong met former cyclist Coen Rijpma and they started dating. They got married in the summer of 2022 and live together in her birth town of Rottum.
