= World record progression team sprint speed skating women =

The world record progression team sprint women as recognised by the International Skating Union.

Team sprint was first introduced on the calendar of the 2015-16 World Cup. It is part of the European Championships since 2018 and the World Single Distances Speed Skating Championships of 2018-19. Official results are recorded since the 2015-2016 skating season. The first World Cup with a team sprint event was on November 14th, 2015, a race that was won by the team from Japan. The first official world record was recognised by ISU at the Calgary World Cup on December 1st, 2017.

Nr	Nation	Names	Result	Date	Venue	Meeting
1*	JAP	Erina Kamiya; Maki Tsuji; Nao Kodaira	1:26.82	14 November 2015	Calgary	World Cup
2*	CHN	Yu Jing; Zhang Hong; Li Qishi	1:24.65	22 November 2015	Salt Lake City	World Cup
3	Russia	Yekaterina Shikhova; Olga Fatkulina; Angelina Golikova	1:24.84	1 December 2017	Calgary	World Cup
4	NED	Femke Kok; Jutta Leerdam; Laetitia de Jong	1:24.02	13 February 2020	Salt Lake City	World Championship

* Unofficial world record
