= Ragne Wiklund =

Norwegian speed skater and orienteer

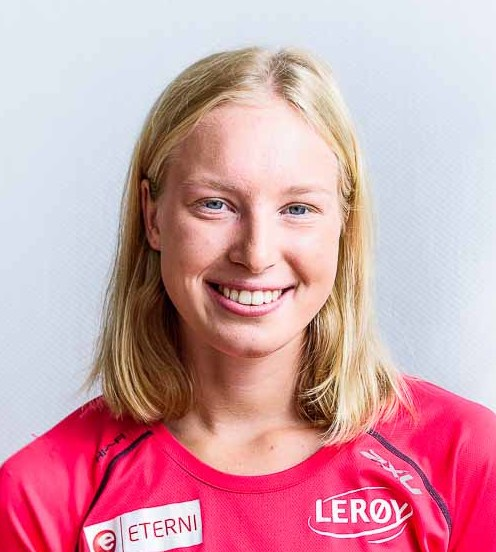
- Wiklund in 2018

Personal information
- Nationality: Norwegian
- Born: 9 May 2000 (age 26) Oslo, Norway
- Height: 1.78 m (5 ft 10 in)

Sport
- Country: Norway
- Sport: Speed skating
- Event: 1500 m
- Club: Aktiv SK
Medal record
Women's speed skating
Representing Norway
Olympic Games
Silver medal – second place	2026 Milano Cortina	1500 m
Silver medal – second place	2026 Milano Cortina	3000 m
Bronze medal – third place	2026 Milano Cortina	5000 m
World Single Distances Championships
Gold medal – first place	2021 Heerenveen	1500 m
Gold medal – first place	2023 Heerenveen	3000 m
Silver medal – second place	2023 Heerenveen	1500 m
Silver medal – second place	2023 Heerenveen	5000 m
Silver medal – second place	2025 Hamar	5000 m
World Allround Championships
Gold medal – first place	2026 Heerenveen	Allround
European Championships
Gold medal – first place	2026 Tomaszow Mazowiecki	3000 m
Gold medal – first place	2026 Tomaszow Mazowiecki	1500 m
Silver medal – second place	2022 Heerenveen	Team pursuit
Silver medal – second place	2023 Hamar	Allround
Bronze medal – third place	2024 Heerenveen	3000 m
Bronze medal – third place	2025 Heerenveen	Allround
Women's Orienteering
Junior World Championships
Bronze medal – third place	2018 Kecskemét	Relay

Ragne Wiklund (born 9 May 2000) is a Norwegian long track speed skater and orienteer.

Wiklund represented her nation at the 2019 World Single Distance Speed Skating Championships in the 1500 metres event (19th) and at the 2019 World Allround Speed Skating Championships, finishing 21st overall. She participated at the European Speed Skating Championships for Women in 2019. She also competed at other international competitions, including at ISU Speed Skating World Cups.

Wiklund won the 1500m event at the 2021 World Single Distances Speed Skating Championships, held in Heerenveen, achieving a personal record of 1.54,61. She won ahead of Brittany Bowe from the United States and Evgeniia Lalenkova, competing for the Russian Skating Union.

After winning the 3000m event at the 2026 European Speed Skating Championships, becoming the first female Norwegian European Champion ever in speed skating, Wiklund captured three medals at the 2026 Milano Cortina Winter Olympics. She won the silver medal in the Women's 1500m and in the Women's 3000m, and won the Bronze Medal in the Women's 5000m.

Wiklund is also an active orienteer. Wiklund achieved a bronze medal in the Junior World Orienteering Championships in the 2018 relay, running for Norway. In 2021, she ran for the senior Norwegian team for the first time at a world cup event in Dalarna, Sweden.

== Records ==
=== Personal records ===
Personal records
Speed skating
Event	Result	Date	Location	Notes
500 m	38,84	7 March 2026	Heerenveen	
1000 m	1.14,11	4 December 2021	Salt Lake City	
1500 m	1.51,96	15 November 2025	Salt Lake City	NR
3000 m	3.54,74	24 January 2026	Inzell	NR
5000 m	6.46,15	5 March 2023	Heerenveen	NR

Wiklund occupies the 11th position on the Adelskalender with a score of 156.648 points

== Tournament overview ==
Season	Norwegian Championships Single Distances	Norwegian Championships Allround	European Championships Allround	European Championships Single Distances	World Championships Allround	World Championships Single Distances	Olympic Games	World Cup	Norwegian Championships Juniors	World Championships Juniors
2017–18	STAVANGER 5th 1000m 4th 1500m 4th 3000m (silver) 5000m	JEVNAKER (silver) 500m (bronze) 3000m (silver) 1500m (bronze) 5000m (bronze) overall						74th 1500m 73rd 3000m/5000m	ASKER (gold) 500m (gold) 1500m (gold) 1000m (gold) 3000m (gold) overall	SALT LAKE CITY 16th 500m 10th 1500m 11th 1000m 6th 3000m (bronze) overall 6th team sprint
2018–19	HAMAR (bronze) 1000m (silver) 1500m (bronze) 3000m (bronze) 5000m	ARENDAL (silver) 500m (bronze) 3000m (bronze) 1500m 4th 5000m (silver) overall	COLLALBO 6th 500m 9th 3000m 8th 1500m DNQ 5000m NC11th overall		CALGARY 17th 500m 20th 3000m 21st 1500m DNQ 5000m NC21th overall	INZELL 15th 1500m		21st 1000m 15th 1500m 25th 3000m/5000m		BASELGA di PINÈ 15th 500m (bronze) 1500m 4th 1000m (gold) 3000m (bronze) overall (bronze) team sprint
2019–20				HEERENVEEN 17th 1500 m				39th 1500m 29th 3000m/5000m		
2020–21	HAMAR (silver) 1000m (silver) 1500m (gold) 3000m (gold) 5000m	HAMAR (gold) 500m (gold) 3000m (gold) 1500m (gold) 5000m (gold) overall	HEERENVEEN 6th 500m 13th 3000m 7th 1500m 6th 5000m 6th overall			HEERENVEEN (gold) 1500m 4th 3000m 6th 5000m 4th Team pursuit		8th 1500m 9th 3000m/5000m (bronze) team pursuit		
2021–22				HEERENVEEN 5th 1500 m 4th 3000 m (silver) team pursuit	HAMAR (bronze) 500m (silver) 3000m (bronze) 1500m 9th 5000m 4th overall		BEIJING 12th 1500m 5th 3000m 5th 5000m 6th team pursuit	39th 1000m 4th 1500m (silver) 3000m/5000m 5th team pursuit		
2022–23	HAMAR (gold) 1500m (gold) 3000m (gold) 5000m	STAVANGER (gold) 500m (gold) 3000m (gold) 1500m (gold) 5000m (gold) overall	HAMAR (gold) 500m 4th 3000m (gold) 1500m (bronze) 5000m (silver) overall			HEERENVEEN (silver) 1500m (gold) 3000m (silver) 5000m 5th Team pursuit		47th 1000m (silver) 1500m (gold) 3000m/5000m 10th team pursuit		
