= 2019 World Allround Speed Skating Championships =

International speed skating competition

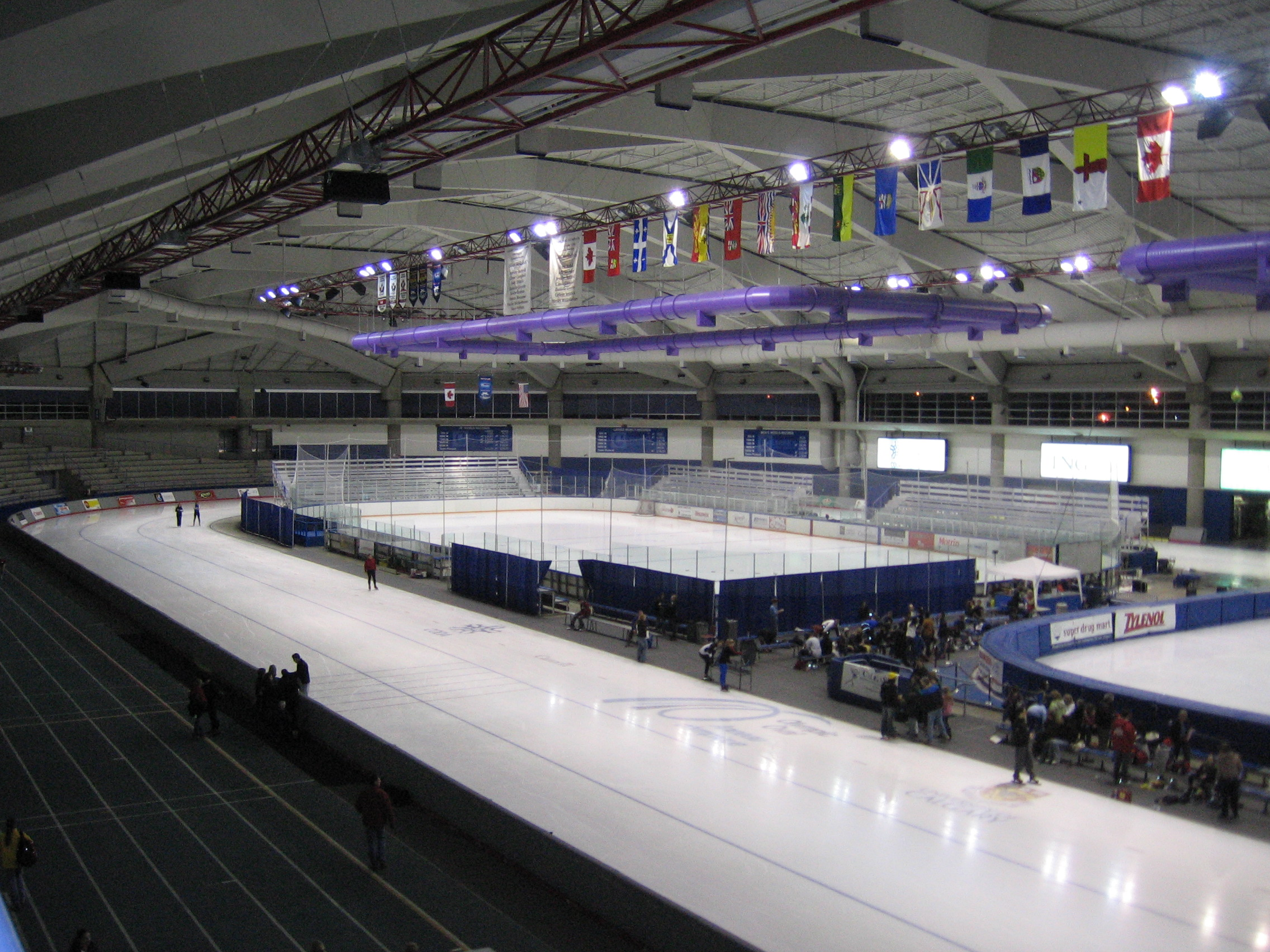
- Olympic Oval Calgary
- Location: Calgary, Canada
- Venue: Olympic Oval
- Dates: 2–3 March

Medalist men
1st place, gold medalist(s)		Patrick Roest	Netherlands
2nd place, silver medalist(s)		Sverre Lunde Pedersen	Norway
3rd place, bronze medalist(s)		Sven Kramer	Netherlands

Medalist women
1st place, gold medalist(s)		Martina Sáblíková	Czech Republic
2nd place, silver medalist(s)		Miho Takagi	Japan
3rd place, bronze medalist(s)		Antoinette de Jong	Netherlands

The 2019 World Allround Speed Skating Championships were held at the Olympic Oval in Calgary, Canada, from 2 –3 March 2019.

== Schedule ==
All times are local (UTC−6).

Date	Time	Event
2 March	12:00	Women's 500 m
2 March	12:00	Men's 500 m
2 March	12:00	Women's 3000 m
2 March	12:00	Men's 5000 m
3 March	12:00	Women's 1500 m
3 March	12:00	Men's 1500 m
3 March	12:00	Women's 5000 m
3 March	12:00	Men's 10,000 m

== Medal summary ==
=== Medal table ===
Rank	Nation	Gold	Silver	Bronze	Total
1	Netherlands (NED)	1	0	2	3
2	Czech Republic (CZE)	1	0	0	1
3	Japan (JPN)	0	1	0	1
3	Norway (NOR)	0	1	0	1
Totals (4 entries)		2	2	2	6

=== Medalists ===
Event	Gold		Silver		Bronze	
Men	Patrick Roest; Netherlands	145.561	Sverre Lunde Pedersen; Norway	146.075	Sven Kramer; Netherlands	146.962
Women	Martina Sáblíková; Czech Republic	156.306	Miho Takagi; Japan	156.878	Antoinette de Jong; Netherlands	157.840
