= Martina Sáblíková =

Czech speed skater and cyclist

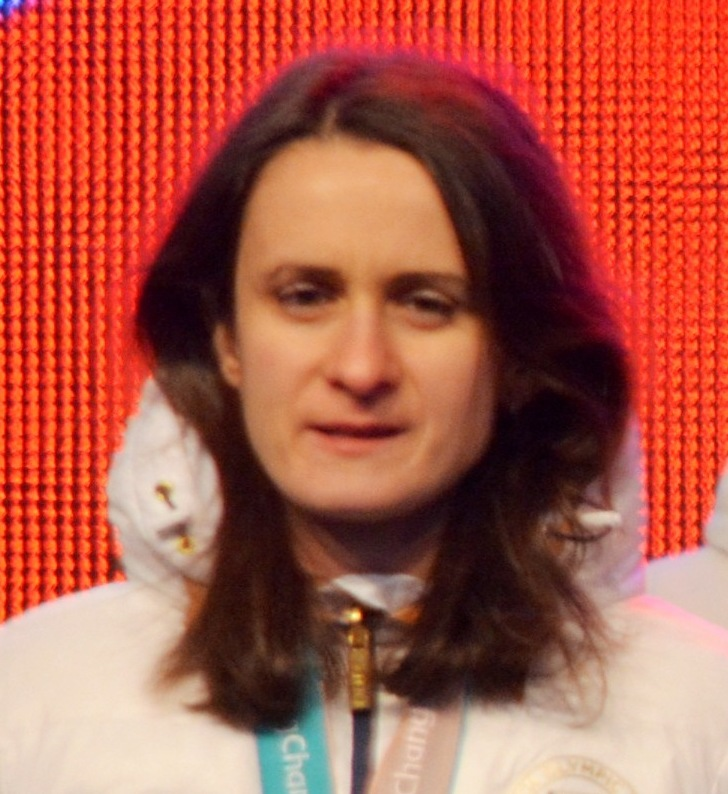
- Sáblíková in 2018

Personal information
- Nationality: Czech
- Born: 27 May 1987 (age 39) Nové Město na Moravě, Czechoslovakia
- Height: 1.71 m (5 ft 7 in)
- Weight: 54 kg (119 lb)

Sport
- Country: Czech Republic
- Sport: Speed skating, cycling
- Events: 3000 m, 5000 m
- Club: NOWIS
Medal record
Women's speed skating
Representing Czech Republic
Event	1st	2nd	3rd
Olympic Games	3	2	2
World Championships	5	2	1
World Single Distances Championships	16	7	4
European Championships	5	3	4
Winter Universiade	2	0	0
World Junior Championships	0	1	0
Total	31	15	11
Olympic Games
Gold medal – first place	2010 Vancouver	3000 m
Gold medal – first place	2010 Vancouver	5000 m
Gold medal – first place	2014 Sochi	5000 m
Silver medal – second place	2014 Sochi	3000 m
Silver medal – second place	2018 Pyeongchang	5000 m
Bronze medal – third place	2010 Vancouver	1500 m
Bronze medal – third place	2022 Beijing	5000 m
World Single Distance Championships
Gold medal – first place	2007 Salt Lake City	3000 m
Gold medal – first place	2007 Salt Lake City	5000 m
Gold medal – first place	2008 Nagano	5000 m
Gold medal – first place	2009 Vancouver	5000 m
Gold medal – first place	2011 Inzell	5000 m
Gold medal – first place	2012 Heerenveen	3000 m
Gold medal – first place	2012 Heerenveen	5000 m
Gold medal – first place	2013 Sochi	5000 m
Gold medal – first place	2015 Heerenveen	3000 m
Gold medal – first place	2015 Heerenveen	5000 m
Gold medal – first place	2016 Kolomna	3000 m
Gold medal – first place	2016 Kolomna	5000 m
Gold medal – first place	2017 Gangneung	5000 m
Gold medal – first place	2019 Inzell	3000 m
Gold medal – first place	2019 Inzell	5000 m
Gold medal – first place	2020 Salt Lake City	3000 m
Silver medal – second place	2009 Vancouver	3000 m
Silver medal – second place	2011 Inzell	3000 m
Silver medal – second place	2013 Sochi	3000 m
Silver medal – second place	2017 Gangneung	3000 m
Silver medal – second place	2020 Salt Lake City	5000 m
Silver medal – second place	2021 Heerenveen	3000 m
Silver medal – second place	2025 Hamar	3000 m
Bronze medal – third place	2023 Heerenveen	3000 m
Bronze medal – third place	2023 Heerenveen	5000 m
Bronze medal – third place	2024 Calgary	3000 m
Bronze medal – third place	2024 Calgary	5000 m
World Allround Championships
Gold medal – first place	2009 Hamar	Allround
Gold medal – first place	2010 Heerenveen	Allround
Gold medal – first place	2015 Calgary	Allround
Gold medal – first place	2016 Berlin	Allround
Gold medal – first place	2019 Calgary	Allround
Silver medal – second place	2012 Moscow	Allround
Silver medal – second place	2017 Hamar	Allround
Bronze medal – third place	2011 Calgary	Allround
European Championships
Gold medal – first place	2007 Collalbo	Allround
Gold medal – first place	2010 Hamar	Allround
Gold medal – first place	2011 Collalbo	Allround
Gold medal – first place	2012 Budapest	Allround
Gold medal – first place	2016 Minsk	Allround
Silver medal – second place	2015 Chelyabinsk	Allround
Silver medal – second place	2017 Heerenveen	Allround
Silver medal – second place	2019 Collalbo	Allround
Bronze medal – third place	2008 Kolomna	Allround
Bronze medal – third place	2009 Heerenveen	Allround
Bronze medal – third place	2014 Hamar	Allround
Bronze medal – third place	2021 Heerenveen	Allround
Winter Universiade
Gold medal – first place	2013 Trentino	3000 m
Gold medal – first place	2013 Trentino	5000 m
World Junior Championships
Silver medal – second place	2006 Erfurt	Allround

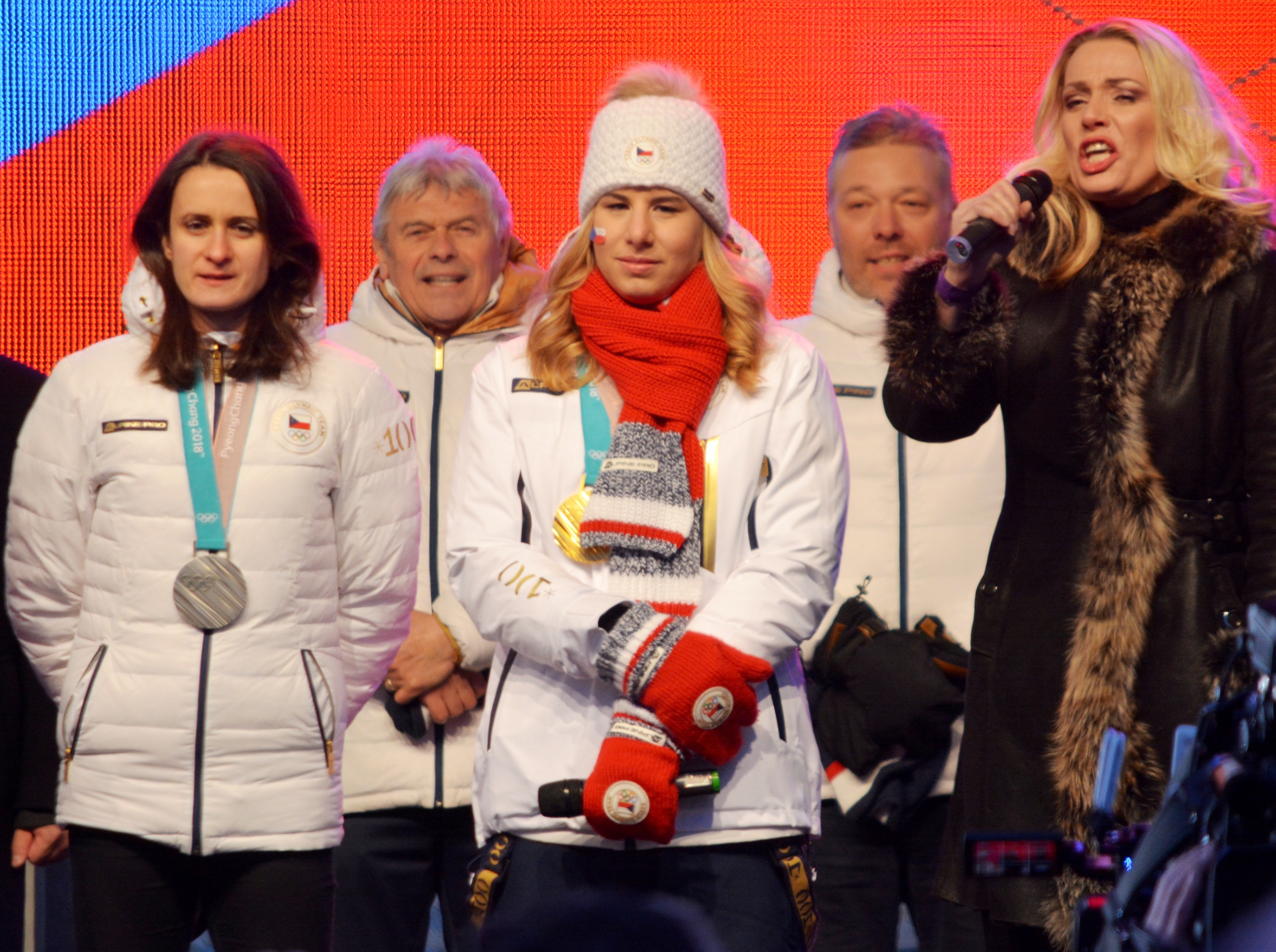
Sáblíková (left) with Ester Ledecká at Old Town Square in Prague after their return from Olympic Games in South Korea

Martina Sáblíková (Czech pronunciation: [ˈmarcɪna ˈsaːbliːkovaː]) (born 27 May 1987) is a Czech former speed skater, specializing in long track speed skating. She is a three-time Olympic gold medal winner and a multiple European and World allround champion. She became the first Czech to win two Olympic gold medals at one Winter Games in 2010. Sáblíková also competes in inline speed skating and road cycling races as a part of her summer preparation for the skating season. In cycling, she focuses on individual time trial discipline in which Sáblíková holds multiple Czech Republic National Championships titles and belongs to the world's top 15 female time-trialists. Sáblíková is the elder sister of fellow speedskater Milan Sáblík.

== Career ==
As a junior, Sáblíková already achieved some notable results during international tournaments. In 2005, she came seventh in the 5000 m during the World Single Distance Championships. On 18 November 2005, she skated the 3000 m junior world record 4:00.69 in Salt Lake City. She was the Czech youth champion in 1999, 2001, and 2004.

In the 2006 European allround championships in Hamar, she finished fourth overall, placing third at the 3000 m and winning the 5000 m. In the 5000 m, she surprisingly beat favorite Claudia Pechstein. At the 2006 Winter Olympics in Turin, she finished fourth in the 5000 m behind Clara Hughes, Pechstein, and Cindy Klassen. During her race against Klassen, she was more than three seconds faster in the last round but eventually missed the bronze medal by a second.

Because of Sáblíková's results, her position on the all-time world ranking, the Adelskalender, increased from 94th to 15th place within a year. In March 2006, she skated a world record at the 10,000 m, beating Hughes's best time by more than 11 seconds.

=== European champion ===
The following year she won her first major tournament, the 2007 European Speed Skating Championships in Collalbo, with an outdoor world record samalog score of 162.954 points. She won both the 3000 m and the 5000 m in outdoor world record times. She did not perform as well at the World allround championships in Heerenveen, where she finished fifth, but she managed to win the 3000 and 5000 m events at the 2006–07 Speed Skating World Cup. At the end of the season, she won two gold medals at the 2007 World Single Distance Speed Skating Championships in Salt Lake City in the 3000 m and 5000 m events. At those Championships, she set a new world record of 6:45.61 in the 5000 m event, 1.3 seconds faster than the previous record of Claudia Pechstein.

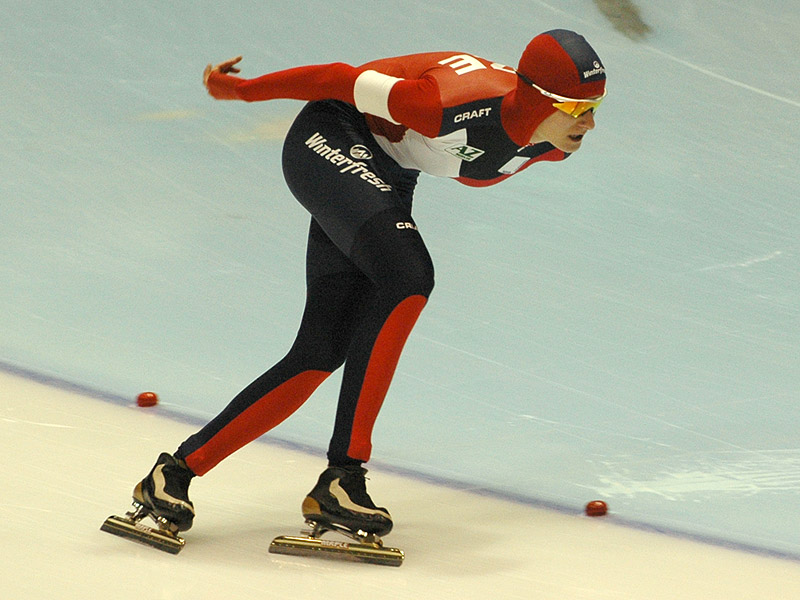
Martina Sáblíková at the 2007 World Championships in Heerenveen.

On 15 March 2007, Sáblíková became the first female speed skater to skate a 10,000 m below 14 minutes when she went 13:48.33 in Calgary. She improved her one-year-old world record by almost 20 seconds, which would have belonged to the top 100 men of all time. In December 2007, she took 18th place in the poll European Sportsperson of the Year of the Polish Press Agency. She also won the title of the Sportsperson of the Year of the Czech Republic twice – in 2007 and 2009.

One week before the start of the 2007–08 World Cup season, Sáblíková fell during her training, and fractured her humerus and stretched ligaments. Although the injury limited her training in the beginning, she had an excellent season, and finally got the title with 6 out of 7 world cup wins (including the final) at the 3000 m and 5000 m distances. She also finished 9th at the 1500 m.

On 13 January, she took bronze at the 2008 European allround championships in Kolomna, Russia. On 12 January, the first day of the event, she improved her personal best at the 500 m distance, her weakest distance, with a time of 40.58 seconds. However, it was still too slow to compete with the best skaters. She finished 3rd despite winning the 3000 m and 5000 m distances. On 10 February she finished 5th at the World Allround Championships in Heerenveen, again winning the 5000 m, but with a poor 500 m result.

On 9 March 2008, she won gold at the 5000 m at the World Single Distance Championships in Nagano, Japan. However, she was very disappointed with her 3000 m performance two days before, when she finished 4th.

On 11 January 2009 she repeated her previous bronze performance at the European allround championships despite her traditionally weak performance at the 500 m and surprising 4th place at the 3000 m. However, on 8 February she took gold at the World allround championships in Hamar after setting a new Czech national record in the 500 m at 40.28 seconds and winning the 3000 m and 5000 m distances. It was the first world allround medal in her career. On 1 February 2009, Sáblíková and her fellow Czech competitors Andrea Jirků and Karolína Erbanová won the team pursuit competition at the World Cup Final in Erfurt, setting new Czech national record of 3:05.32. After the leading Dutch team did not finish the race, they also won the whole 2008/2009 World Cup.

=== Olympic champion ===
At the Winter Olympic Games in Vancouver in 2010, Sáblíková won three medals, two golds (3000 and 5000 metres), and one bronze (1500 metres). She thus became the first Czech to win two gold medals in the same Winter Olympic Games.

At the 2014 Winter Olympics in Sochi, Sáblíková successfully defended her title in the 5000 meter, while also winning a silver medal in the 3000 meter. At the 2018 Winter Olympics in Pyeongchang County, she won silver in the 5000 m behind Esmee Visser. Sáblíková also won a bronze medal in the 5000m at the 2022 Winter Olympics in Beijing. Her last Olympic appearance at the 2026 Winter Olympics in Milan had Sáblíková skipping the 3000 meters due to illness, and still not in the best shape in the 5000 meters, finished a whole lap behind champion Francesca Lollobrigida and 11th overall, but followed completion with a lap of honor and bowing to the audience. Sáblíková retired after the World Allround Speed Skating Championships at the Thialf in Heerenveen, held in March 2026.

Martina Sáblíková and Milan Sáblík are a rare example of sister and brother both holding world records in the same sport at the same time; Martina holds the (senior) world records in the 5000 m and 10,000 m events (both from March 2007) and in the 3000 m event (from March 2019), while Milan shared the junior world record for the team pursuit with fellow Czech junior skaters Pavel Kulma and Zdeněk Haselberger (from November 2007 till March 2010). Sáblíková has been successful despite there being no speed skating rinks in the Czech Republic. Because of this, Sáblíková's coach Petr Novák had to devise several unorthodox but successful training methods.

== Rio 2016 qualification controversy ==
As an international caliber cyclist, Sáblíková had long harboured the dream of competing in the Olympic time trial event at the 2016 Summer Olympics in Rio de Janeiro. After finishing 12th in 2015 in the women's time trial at the UCI World Road Championships in Richmond, U.S. (9th in the reduced rankings), Sáblíková was thought to have secured a place at Rio 2016. However, when the UCI published the list of nations that qualified for this event at Rio 2016, the Czech Republic was not among them. The UCI used an interpretation of the qualification rules where an athlete also has to qualify for the road race. She traveled to Rio, hoping the decision might be overturned but did not compete.

== 2025 World Speed Skating Single Distances Championships ==
Sáblíková took part In the 2025 World Single Distances Speed Skating Championships, in Hamar, Norway. Even though battling illness, Sáblíková finished fifth in the women's 5000m at the World Single Distances Speed Skating Championships. This marked the first time in her career that she did not secure a medal in this event. Despite a fever making her participation uncertain until two hours before the race, Sáblíková chose to compete, stating her desire to "leave with honour." She plans to retire after the next season.

== Records ==
=== Personal records ===
Personal records
Women's speed skating
Event	Result	Date	Location	Notes
500 m	39.23	7 March 2015	Calgary	
1000 m	1:15.86	14 November 2015	Calgary	
1500 m	1:53.44	21 November 2015	Salt Lake City	NR
3000 m	3:52.02	9 March 2019	Salt Lake City	WR
5000 m	6:41.18	15 February 2020	Salt Lake City	NR
10,000 m*	13:48.33	15 March 2007	Calgary	Best world performance

*=not an official distance for women, so no official World record.
Source: SpeedskatingResults.com

She is currently in 5th position in the adelskalender.

=== World records ===
Event	Time	Date	Venue
10,000 m	14:08.28	23 March 2006	Calgary
5000 m	6:45.61	11 March 2007	Salt Lake City
10000 m	13:48.33	15 March 2007	Calgary
5000 m	6:42.66	18 February 2011	Salt Lake City
3000 m	3:53.31	2 March 2019	Calgary
5000 m	6:42.01	3 March 2019	Calgary
3000 m	3:52.027	9 March 2019	Salt Lake City
5000 m	6:41.18	15 February 2020	Salt Lake City

Source: SpeedSkatingStats.com

== In-line skating and cycling ==
Sáblíková also competed in several inline speed skating and cycling races as a part of her summer preparation for the skating season. In 2004, she finished 16th at the Junior Inline Speed Skating World Championships on the 20 km distance in Sulmona. In 2006, she won the marathon (42.2 km) at the Czech Inline Speed Skating Championships in Plzeň and in 2007 the half marathon (21.6 km) in Ostrava. In 2007, she also took bronze in individual time trial on the 24 km distance at the European U23-Junior Road Cycling Championships in Sofia and another bronze on the 18 km distance at the Czech Road Cycling Championships in Žďár nad Sázavou. In 2010, she took gold at the Czech Road and Time Trial National Championship.

== Personal life ==
On 27 April 2025, Sáblíková in her post on Instagram came out as lesbian. She revealed her twelve year long relationship with another Czech speed skater Nikola Zdráhalová. They married in 2026.

Olympic Games
Preceded by Aleš Valenta	Flagbearer for the Czech Republic; Turin 2006	Succeeded by Jaromír Jágr
