= Carien Kleibeuker =

Dutch speed skater

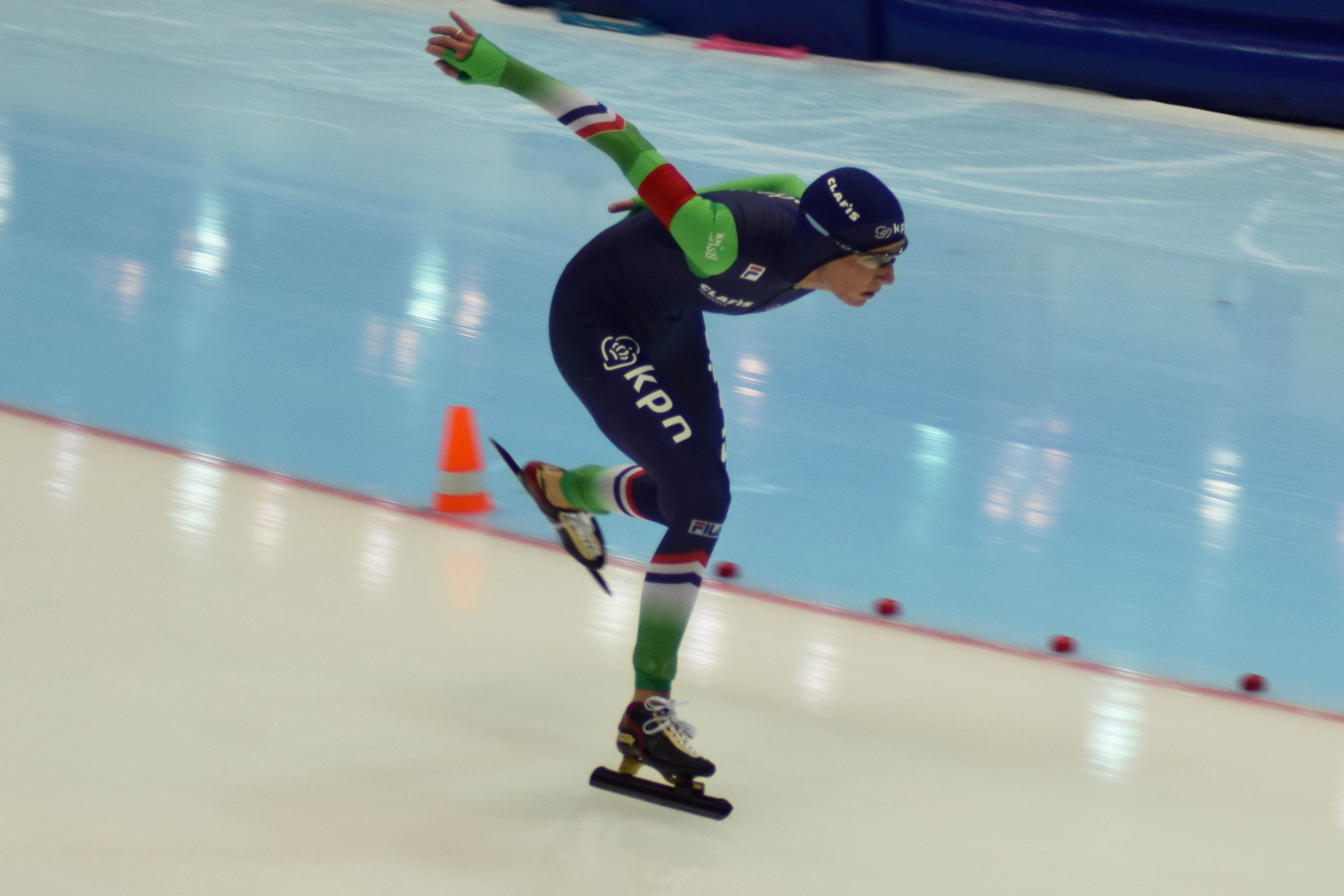

Personal information
- Born: 12 March 1978 (age 48) Rotterdam, Netherlands
- Height: 172 cm (5 ft 8 in)
- Weight: 58 kg (128 lb)

Sport
- Country: Netherlands
- Sport: Speed skating
Medal record
Olympic Games
Bronze medal – third place	2014 Sochi	5000 m
World Championships
Silver medal – second place	2016 Kolomna	5000 m

Carien Kleibeuker (born 12 March 1978) is a Dutch former speed skater who is specialised in the long distances, 3000 and mainly 5000 metres. She is the current holder of the Dutch record on the 10,000 metres distances, as well as the current holder of the unofficial world one-hour record, with 40,569.56 metres skated.

== Speed skating ==
During the Dutch Single Distance Championships Kleibeuker won her first medal at a highly rated tournament as she finished in third position at the 5000 metres. In the following years she participated, but never managed to equal or improve her effort from 2000, until December 2005, when she won the 5000 metres race in the B Division at a World Cup meeting. This effort secured her a nomination for the 2006 Winter Olympics held in Turin. A top-3 ranking at the 2005 Dutch Single Distance Championships would definitely qualify her for the Olympics. She let no hesitation and won the distance with big names as Renate Groenewold, Gretha Smit and Moniek Kleinsman behind her. At the 2006 Winter Olympics Kleibeuker would finish in 10th position in the women's 5000 metres.

Besides long track speed skating, Kleibeuker also is a marathon speed skater. As of the 2007–08 season she will only focus on marathon skating, dropping her long track appearances.

=== Bribery witness ===
At the 2006 Turin Olympics, Kleibeuker witnessed a bribery attempt by two members of the Dutch speed skating team. In 2009, she was called in as a witness by the Netherlands Olympic Committee and Sports Federation, which found that coach Ingrid Paul had offered Polish speed-skater Katarzyna Bachleda-Curuś money to forfeit the race. If she had withdrawn, it would have allowed Gretha Smit, who was eliminated, to be reinstated. Bachleda-Curuś refused.

=== Records ===
==== Personal records ====
Personal records
Speed skating
Event	Result	Date	Location	Notes
500 m	43:29	12 October 2019	Max Aicher Arena, Inzell	
1000 m	1:24.41	6 February 1999	Stadio del Ghiaccio, Baselga di Pinè	
1500 m	2:02.07	15 October 2017	Max Aicher Arena, Inzell	
3000 m	4:03.79	5 December 2014	Sportforum Hohenschönhausen, Berlin	
5000 m	6:45.04	20 November 2015	Utah Olympic Oval, Salt Lake City	Dutch record until beaten by Irene Schouten on 10 February 2022.
10000 m	14:35.61	13 March 2018	Thialf, Heerenveen	Current Dutch record.
1 hour	40,569.56 m	9 December 2015	Max Aicher Arena, Inzell	Current world record (unofficial).

==== World records ====
World records
Women's speed skating
Event	Result	Date	Location	Notes
1 hour	40,569.56 m	9 December 2015	Max Aicher Arena, Inzell	Current world record (unofficial).

== Tournament overview ==
Season	Dutch Championships Allround	Dutch Championships Single Distances	World Championships Single Distances	Olympic Games
1996–97		THE HAGUE 8th 3000m		
1997–98	DEVENTER 14th 500m 13th 3000m 13th 1500m DNQ 5000m NC overall			
1998–99	THE HAGUE 14th 500m 7th 3000m DNS 1500m DNQ 5000m NC overall	GRONINGEN 11th 3000m 4th 5000m		
1999–2000		DEVENTER 5th 3000m (bronze) 5000m	NAGANO 4th 5000m	
2000–01	HEERENVEEN 16th 500m 16th 3000m 14th 1500m DNQ 5000m NC overall	THE HAGUE 13 1500m 6th 3000m 5th 5000m		
2001–02		GRONINGEN 8th 3000m 5th 5000m		
2002–03		UTRECHT 15th 3000m		
2003–04		HEERENVEEN 12th 3000m		
2004–05	HEERENVEEN 18th 500m 11th 3000m 18th 1500m DNQ 5000m NC overall	ASSEN 11th 3000; 5th 5000m		
2005–06		HEERENVEEN 9th 3000; (gold) 5000m		TURIN 10th 5000m
2006–07		ASSEN 10th 3000m (bronze) 5000m		
2012–13		HEERENVEEN 6th Mass start		
2013–14		HEERENVEEN 10th 3000m (silver) 5000m 15th Mass start		SOCHI (bronze) 5000m
2014–15		HEERENVEEN 5th 3000m (gold) 5000m 4th Mass start		
2015–16		HEERENVEEN 5th 3000m (gold) 5000m 10th Mass start	HEERENVEEN (silver) 5000m	
2016–17		HEERENVEEN (gold) 5000m 7th Mass start		
2017–18		HEERENVEEN 5th 3000m (silver) 5000m		
2018–19		HEERENVEEN 5th 3000m (silver) 5000m 8th Mass start	INZELL 5th 5000m	
2019–20		HEERENVEEN 5th 5000m		

Records
Preceded by (Netherlands) Maria Sterk	Women's 1 hour speed skating world record (unofficial); 9 December 2015 – present	Succeeded by Current holder
