= 2018–19 ISU Speed Skating World Cup – World Cup 6 =

The sixth and final competition weekend of the 2018–19 ISU Speed Skating World Cup was held at the Utah Olympic Oval in Salt Lake City, United States, from Sunday, 9 March, until Sunday, 10 March 2019.

== Schedule ==
The detailed event schedule:

Date	Events
Saturday, 9 March	500 m women (1); 1000 m women 3000 m women 500 m men (1); 1000 m men 5000 m men
Sunday, 10 March	500 m women (2); 1500 m women Mass start 500 m men (2); 1500 m men Mass start

== Medal summary ==
=== Men's events ===
Event	Race #	Gold	Time	Silver	Time	Bronze	Time	Report
500 m	1	(Russia) Pavel Kulizhnikov	33.62 WR, TR	(Japan) Tatsuya Shinhama	33.84	(Japan) Yuma Murakami	34.11	
500 m	2	(Japan) Tatsuya Shinhama	33.79	(South Korea) Min Kyu Cha	34.03	(Japan) Yuma Murakami	34.10	
1000 m		(Netherlands) Kjeld Nuis	1:06.18 WR, TR	(Netherlands) Thomas Krol	1:06.26	(Netherlands) Kai Verbij	1:06.35	
1500 m		(Netherlands) Kjeld Nuis	1:40.18 WR, TR	(Netherlands) Thomas Krol	1:40.54	(Russia) Denis Yuskov	1:41.50	
5000 m		(Netherlands) Patrick Roest	6:03.71	(Netherlands) Marcel Bosker	6:08.90	(Canada) Ted-Jan Bloemen	6:09.65	
Mass Start		(Japan) Ryosuke Tsuchiya	69	(Belarus) Vitaly Mikhailov	46	(Netherlands) Simon Schouten	20	

=== Women's events ===
Event	Race #	Gold	Time	Silver	Time	Bronze	Time	Report
500 m	1	(Japan) Nao Kodaira	36.47	(Austria) Vanessa Herzog	36.85	(Russia) Angelina Golikova	36.93	
500 m	2	(Japan) Nao Kodaira	36.49	(Russia) Olga Fatkulina	36.83	(Austria) Vanessa Herzog	36.84	
1000 m		(United States) Brittany Bowe	1:11.61 WR, TR	(Japan) Miho Takagi	1:11.71	(Japan) Nao Kodaira	1:11.78	
1500 m		(Japan) Miho Takagi	1:49.84 WR, TR	(United States) Brittany Bowe	1:50.33	(Russia) Yekaterina Shikhova	1:50.64	
3000 m		(Czech Republic) Martina Sáblíková	3:52.02 WR, TR	(Netherlands) Esmee Visser	3:54.02	(Russia) Natalia Voronina	3:54.06	
Mass Start		(Netherlands) Irene Schouten	60	(South Korea) Kim Bo-reum	40	(Canada) Ivanie Blondin	21	

== Standings ==
Standings after completion of the event.

=== Men ===
500 m

Rank	Name	Points
1	(Russia) Pavel Kulizhnikov	630
2	(Japan) Tatsuya Shinhama	594
3	(Norway) Håvard Holmefjord Lorentzen	498

1000 m

Rank	Name	Points
1	(Netherlands) Kjeld Nuis	342
2	(Netherlands) Kai Verbij	304
3	(Russia) Pavel Kulizhnikov	303

1500 m

Rank	Name	Points
1	(Russia) Denis Yuskov	319
2	(South Korea) Min Seok Kim	279
3	(Netherlands) Kjeld Nuis	274

Long distance

Rank	Name	Points
1	(Russia) Aleksandr Rumyantsev	322
2	(Netherlands) Marcel Bosker	320
3	(Norway) Sverre Lunde Pedersen	317

Mass start

Rank	Name	Points
1	(South Korea) Um Cheon-ho	535
2	(Belgium) Bart Swings	502
3	(Russia) Ruslan Zakharov	434

=== Women ===
500 m

Rank	Name	Points
1	(Austria) Vanessa Herzog	708
2	(Japan) Nao Kodaira	600
3	(Russia) Olga Fatkulina	587

1000 m

Rank	Name	Points
1	(United States) Brittany Bowe	397
2	(Japan) Miho Takagi	310
3	(Japan) Nao Kodaira	298

1500 m

Rank	Name	Points
1	(United States) Brittany Bowe	378
2	(Japan) Miho Takagi	331
3	(Netherlands) Ireen Wüst	303

Long distance

Rank	Name	Points
1	(Czech Republic) Martina Sáblíková	370
2	(Netherlands) Esmee Visser	343
3	(Russia) Natalia Voronina	335

Mass start

Rank	Name	Points
1	(South Korea) Kim Bo-reum	478
2	(Netherlands) Irene Schouten	456
3	(Italy) Francesca Lollobrigida	414
