= 2023 World Single Distances Speed Skating Championships – Women's 5000 metres =

Women's 5000 metres at the 2023 World Single Distances Speed Skating Championships
- Venue: Thialf
- Location: Heerenveen, Netherlands
- Date: 5 March
- Competitors: 11 from 7 nations
- Winning time: 6:41.25

Medalists
gold medal	Irene Schouten	Netherlands
silver medal	Ragne Wiklund	Norway
bronze medal	Martina Sáblíková	Czech Republic

The Women's 5000 metres competition at the 2023 World Single Distances Speed Skating Championships was held on 5 March 2023.

== Results ==
The race was started at 16:48.

Rank	Pair	Lane	Name	Country	Time	Diff
1st place, gold medalist(s)	6	o	Irene Schouten	Netherlands	6:41.25	
2nd place, silver medalist(s)	6	i	Ragne Wiklund	Norway	6:46.15	+4.90
3rd place, bronze medalist(s)	4	o	Martina Sáblíková	Czech Republic	6:47.78	+6.53
4	5	i	Isabelle Weidemann	Canada	6:49.94	+8.69
5	4	i	Sanne in 't Hof	Netherlands	6:54.77	+13.52
6	2	o	Momoka Horikawa	Japan	6:58.78	+17.53
7	2	i	Sofie Karoline Haugen	Norway	7:06.52	+25.27
8	5	o	Valérie Maltais	Canada	7:07.25	+26.00
9	1	o	Magdalena Czyszczoń	Poland	7:15.67	+34.42
10	3	o	Claudia Pechstein	Germany	7:15.76	+34.51
11	3	i	Josie Hofmann	Germany	7:21.41	+40.16
