= Nadezhda Morozova (speed skater) =

Kazakh speed skater (born 1998)

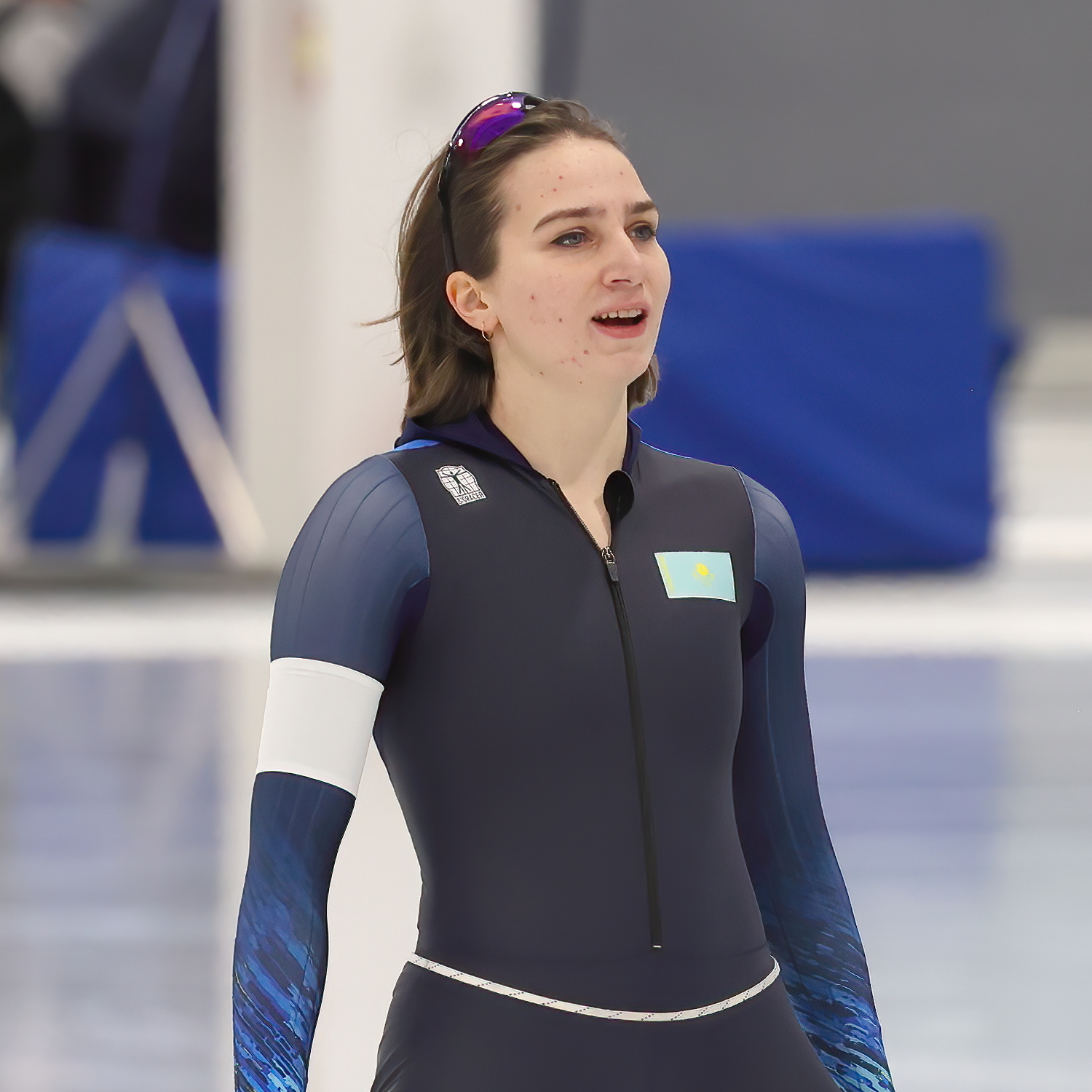
- Morozova in 2022

Personal information
- Native name: Надежда Николаевна Морозова
- Born: 22 September 1998 (age 27) Almaty, Kazakhstan

Sport
- Country: Kazakhstan
- Sport: Speed skating
Medal record
Women's speed skating
Representing Kazakhstan
Four Continents Championships
Gold medal – first place	2023 Quebec	1500 m
Silver medal – second place	2020 Milwaukee	1500 m
Silver medal – second place	2020 Milwaukee	3000 m
Silver medal – second place	2023 Quebec	3000 m
Silver medal – second place	2025 Hachinohe	1000 m
Bronze medal – third place	2025 Hachinohe	Team sprint
Asian Winter Games
Bronze medal – third place	2025 Harbin	Team sprint

Nadezhda Nikolayevna Morozova (née Nadezjda Sidelnik; Russian: Надежда Николаевна Морозова; born September 1998) is a Kazakh long track speed skater.

== Career ==
Morozova participated in the 2020 World Single Distance Speed Skating Championships, in the 1500 metres event and 5000 metres event, and at the 2020 World Allround Speed Skating Championships, finishing 18th overall. She won two silver medals at the 2020 Four Continents Speed Skating Championships. She also competes at other international competitions, including at ISU Speed Skating World Cups. At the 2022 Winter Olympics, she finished 14th in the 1500 metres.

As of 2020 she had been national champion six times.

== Records ==
=== National records ===
1500 m - 1.52,41 - 05.12.2021 - Salt Lake City
3000 m - 3.58,03 - 14.11.2025 - Salt Lake City
5000 m - 7.02,30 - 08.03.2026 - Heerenveen

=== Personal records ===
Personal records
Women's speed skating
Event	Result	Date	Location	Notes
500 m	37,73	22.11.2025	Calgary	
1000 m	1.13,52	15.11.2025	Calgary	
1500 m	1.52,41	05.12.2021	Salt Lake City	Kazakhstani national record
3000 m	3.58,03	14.11.2025	Salt Lake City	Kazakhstani national record
5000 m	7.07,19	15.02.2020	Salt Lake City	Kazakhstani national record
