= 2005 KNSB Dutch Single Distance Championships =

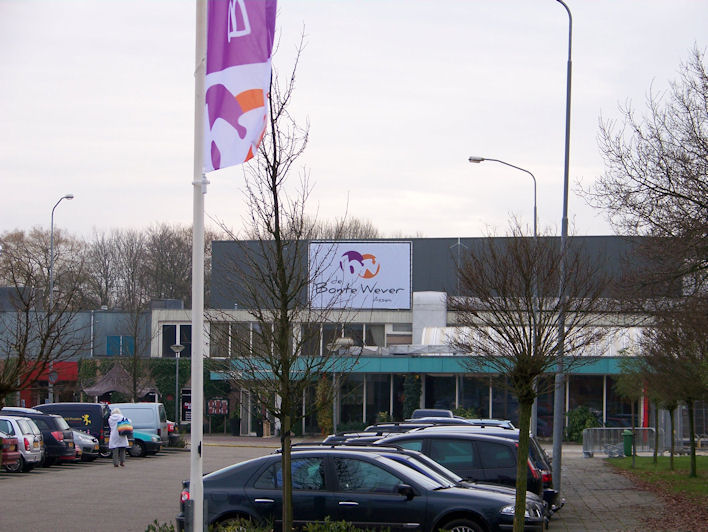
- Ice rink De smelt
- Venue: De Smelt, Assen, Netherlands
- Dates: 5–7 November 2004
- Competitors: 95 skaters with 53 men and 42 women

The 2005 KNSB Dutch Single Distance Championships took place in Assen at the De Smelt ice rink on 5–7 November 2004. Although this tournament was held in 2004 it was the 2005 edition as it was part of the 2004–2005 speed skating season.

== Schedule ==
Schedule
| Date | Distance |
| 5 November 2004 | Men's 500 meter 1st run Women's 500 meter 1st run Men's 500 meter 2nd run Women's 500 meter 2nd run Men's 5000 meter |
| 6 November 2004 | Women's 1000 meter Men's 1000 meter Women's 3000 meter |
| 7 November 2004 | Women's 1500 meter Men's 1500 meter Women's 5000 meter Men's 10,000 meter |

== Medalists ==
=== Men ===
| Event | Gold | | Silver | | Bronze | |
|---|---|---|---|---|---|---|
| 2x500 m details | Gerard van Velde | 72.850 | Beorn Nijenhuis | 72.920 | Erben Wennemars | 72.960 |
| 1000 m details | Beorn Nijenhuis | 1:11.31 | Erben Wennemars | 1:11.86 | Simon Kuipers | 1:12.12 |
| 1500 m details | Beorn Nijenhuis | 1:49.09 | Erben Wennemars | 1:50.36 | Simon Kuipers | 1:50.59 |
| 5000 m details | Bob de Jong | 6:35.32 | Carl Verheijen | 6:37.56 | Gianni Romme | 6:38.82 |
| 10000 m details | Bob de Jong | 13:35.11; BR | Gianni Romme | 13:36.68 | Brigt Rykkje | 13:45.44 |

Source: www.schaatsen.nl & SchaatsStatistieken.nl

=== Women ===
| Event | Gold | | Silver | | Bronze | |
|---|---|---|---|---|---|---|
| 2x500 m details | Marianne Timmer | 79.300 | Frouke Oonk | 80.130 | Annette Gerritsen | 80.750 |
| 1000 m details | Marianne Timmer | 1:20.10 | Renate Groenewold | 1:21.16 | Annamarie Thomas | 1:21.49 |
| 1500 m details | Renate Groenewold | 2:03.22 | Marianne Timmer | 2:04.10 | Frédérique Ankoné | 2:04.30 |
| 3000 m details | Gretha Smit | 4:15.56 | Renate Groenewold | 4:15.82 | Moniek Kleinsman | 4:20.17 |
| 5000 m details | Jenita Hulzebosch | 7:15.76 | Gretha Smit | 7:18.85 | Moniek Kleinsman | 7:26.15 |

Source: www.schaatsen.nl & SchaatsStatistieken.nl
