= KNSB Dutch Single Distance Championships =

Speed skating tournament in the Netherlands

The Dutch Single Distance Championships of speed skating, organised by the Royal Dutch Speed Skating Association (KNSB), is the official Dutch championship to determine the Dutch champion over a single distance, in contrast to the KNSB Dutch Allround Championships, which determine the Dutch allround champion. The single distance championships date back to 1987, and is often used as qualification races for World Cup and Olympic races. The skaters compete for medals in the five Olympic distances: 500, 1000, 1500, 3000 (women only), 5000 and 10,000 (men only) metres. In 2013 the mass start was introduced as a new discipline.

== List of champions ==
Men's events							
Year	Venue	500 m	1000 m	1500 m	5000 m	10.000 m	Mass start
1987	Den Haag / Utrecht (Note: 4-day championship. 500, 1000 and 5000 metres (3000 for women) held in Den Haag the first two days, then the last two distances in Utrecht the following two.)	Menno Boelsma	Bauke Jonkman	Leo Visser	Hein Vergeer	Robert Vunderink	
1988	Heerenveen	Maarten Noyens	Jan Ykema	Leo Visser	Gerard Kemkers	Leo Visser	
1989	Heerenveen	Jan Ykema	Jan Ykema	Annejan Portijk	Gerard Kemkers	Robert Vunderink	
1990	Heerenveen	Arie Loef	Arie Loef	Ben van der Burg	Ben van der Burg	Thomas Bos	
1991	Den Haag	Gerard van Velde	Gerard van Velde	Leo Visser	Bart Veldkamp	Bart Veldkamp	
1992	Heerenveen	Gerard van Velde	Falko Zandstra	Rintje Ritsma	Bart Veldkamp	Bart Veldkamp	
1993	Deventer	Gerard van Velde	Marco Groeneveld	Rintje Ritsma	Rintje Ritsma	Falko Zandstra	
1994	Heerenveen	Gerard van Velde	Gerard van Velde	Rintje Ritsma	Rintje Ritsma	Falko Zandstra	
1995	Den Haag	Gerard van Velde	Gerard van Velde	Falko Zandstra	Rintje Ritsma	Rintje Ritsma	
1996 (Note: 500 and 1 000 metre races held separately three weeks later)	Groningen	Gerard van Velde	Gerard van Velde	Rintje Ritsma	Gianni Romme	Bob de Jong	
1997 (Note: The championship collided with a World Cup race in Davos.)	Den Haag	Andries Kramer	Erben Wennemars	Gijs Buitelaar	Berry Rohling	Berry Rohling	
1998	Heerenveen	Jan Bos	Jan Bos	Rintje Ritsma	Rintje Ritsma	Bob de Jong	
1999	Groningen	Jan Bos	Jakko Jan Leeuwangh	Rintje Ritsma	Gianni Romme	Bob de Jong	
2000	Deventer	Erben Wennemars	Erben Wennemars	Martin Hersman	Bob de Jong	Jochem Uytdehaage	
2001	Den Haag	Erben Wennemars	Erben Wennemars	Gianni Romme	Gianni Romme	Carl Verheijen	
2002	Groningen	Jan Bos	Jan Bos	Martin Hersman	Gianni Romme	Casper Helling	
2003	Utrecht	Erben Wennemars	Erben Wennemars	Erben Wennemars	Gianni Romme	Henk Angenent	
2004	Heerenveen	Gerard van Velde	Erben Wennemars	Erben Wennemars	Carl Verheijen	Jochem Uytdehaage	
2005	Assen	Gerard van Velde	Beorn Nijenhuis	Beorn Nijenhuis	Bob de Jong	Bob de Jong	
2006	Heerenveen	Jan Bos	Jan Bos	Jan Bos	Carl Verheijen	Carl Verheijen	
2007	Assen	Jan Bos	Jan Bos	Sven Kramer	Sven Kramer	Sven Kramer	
2008	Heerenveen	Jan Smeekens	Simon Kuipers	Simon Kuipers	Sven Kramer	Sven Kramer	
2009	Heerenveen	Jan Smeekens	Stefan Groothuis	Sven Kramer	Sven Kramer	Sven Kramer	
2010	Heerenveen	Jan Smeekens	Stefan Groothuis	Rhian Ket	Sven Kramer	Sven Kramer	
2011	Heerenveen	Ronald Mulder	Simon Kuipers	Simon Kuipers	Bob de Vries	Bob de Jong	
2012	Heerenveen	Jan Smeekens	Stefan Groothuis	Stefan Groothuis	Jorrit Bergsma	Bob de Jong	
2013	Heerenveen	Michel Mulder	Kjeld Nuis	Kjeld Nuis	Sven Kramer	Jorrit Bergsma	Arjan Stroetinga
2014	Heerenveen	Jan Smeekens	Kjeld Nuis	Koen Verweij	Sven Kramer	Sven Kramer	Arjan Stroetinga
2015	Heerenveen	Jan Smeekens	Kjeld Nuis	Beorn Nijenhuis	Sven Kramer	Jorrit Bergsma	Arjan Stroetinga
2016	Heerenveen	Kai Verbij	Kjeld Nuis	Kjeld Nuis	Sven Kramer	Sven Kramer	Willem Hoolwerf
2017	Heerenveen	Dai Dai N'tab	Kai Verbij	Sven Kramer	Sven Kramer	Jorrit Bergsma	Gary Hekman
2018	Heerenveen	Dai Dai N'tab	Kai Verbij	Koen Verweij	Sven Kramer	Jorrit Bergsma	Willem Hoolwerf
2019	Heerenveen	Ronald Mulder	Kjeld Nuis	Kjeld Nuis	Patrick Roest	Jorrit Bergsma	Douwe de Vries
2020	Heerenveen	Dai Dai N'tab	Thomas Krol	Thomas Krol	Patrick Roest	Jorrit Bergsma	Arjan Stroetinga
2021	Heerenveen	Dai Dai N'tab	Thomas Krol	Thomas Krol	Patrick Roest	Marwin Talsma	cancelled
2022	Heerenveen	Kai Verbij	Kai Verbij	Thomas Krol	Jorrit Bergsma	Jorrit Bergsma	Bart Hoolwerf
2023	Heerenveen	Merijn Scheperkamp	Kjeld Nuis	Patrick Roest	Patrick Roest	Patrick Roest	Jorrit Bergsma
2024	Heerenveen	Jenning de Boo	Jenning de Boo	Kjeld Nuis	Patrick Roest	Patrick Roest	Harm Visser
2025	Heerenveen	Jenning de Boo	Jenning de Boo	Kjeld Nuis	Chris Huizinga	Chris Huizinga	Bart Hoolwerf
2026	Heerenveen	Jenning de Boo	Joep Wennemars	Kjeld Nuis	Marcel Bosker	Jorrit Bergsma	Jorian ten Cate

Source: Schaatsstatistieken.nl, KNSB.nl

Women's events							
Year	Place	500 m	1000 m	1500 m	3000 m	5000 m	Mass start
1987	Den Haag / Utrecht	Ingrid Haringa	Petra Moolhuizen	Yvonne van Gennip	Yvonne van Gennip	Yvonne van Gennip	
1988	Heerenveen	Ingrid Haringa	Ingrid Haringa	Yvonne van Gennip	Yvonne van Gennip	Yvonne van Gennip	
1989	Heerenveen	Herma Meijer	Ingrid Haringa	Yvonne van Gennip	Marieke Stam	Yvonne van Gennip	
1990	Heerenveen	Christine Aaftink	Christine Aaftink	Herma Meijer	Hanneke de Vries	Hanneke de Vries	
1991	Haarlem	Christine Aaftink	Christine Aaftink	Lia van Schie	Lia van Schie	Lia van Schie	
1992	Heerenveen	Christine Aaftink	Christine Aaftink	Sandra Voetelink	Yvonne van Gennip	Carla Zijlstra	
1993	Deventer	Christine Aaftink	Christine Aaftink	Barbara de Loor	Carla Zijlstra	Carla Zijlstra	
1994	Heerenveen	Christine Aaftink	Christine Aaftink	Annamarie Thomas	Carla Zijlstra	Carla Zijlstra	
1995	Den Haag	Christine Aaftink	Sandra Zwolle	Annamarie Thomas	Carla Zijlstra	Carla Zijlstra	
1996	Groningen	Christine Aaftink	Sandra Zwolle	Marieke Wijsman	Tonny de Jong	Tonny de Jong	
1997	Den Haag	Judith Straathof	Judith Straathof	Judith Straathof	Martine Oosting	Martine Oosting	
1998	Heerenveen	Andrea Nuyt	Marianne Timmer	Annamarie Thomas	Tonny de Jong	Carla Zijlstra	
1999	Groningen	Andrea Nuyt	Marianne Timmer	Barbara de Loor	Tonny de Jong	Carla Zijlstra	
2000	Deventer	Andrea Nuyt	Marianne Timmer	Wieteke Cramer	Marja Vis	Barbara de Loor	
2001	Den Haag	Andrea Nuyt	Andrea Nuyt	Renate Groenewold	Renate Groenewold	Marja Vis	
2002	Groningen	Andrea Nuyt	Marianne Timmer	Tonny de Jong	Tonny de Jong	Tonny de Jong	
2003	Utrecht	Marianne Timmer	Marianne Timmer	Renate Groenewold	Barbara de Loor	Jenita Hulzebosch-Smit	
2004	Heerenveen	Marianne Timmer	Marianne Timmer	Annamarie Thomas	Renate Groenewold	Gretha Smit	
2005	Assen	Marianne Timmer	Marianne Timmer	Renate Groenewold	Gretha Smit	Jenita Hulzebosch-Smit	
2006	Heerenveen	Marianne Timmer	Ireen Wüst	Ireen Wüst	Ireen Wüst	Carien Kleibeuker	
2007	Assen	Margot Boer	Ireen Wüst	Ireen Wüst	Renate Groenewold	Gretha Smit	
2008	Heerenveen	Annette Gerritsen	Paulien van Deutekom	Paulien van Deutekom	Renate Groenewold	Gretha Smit	
2009	Heerenveen	Annette Gerritsen	Paulien van Deutekom	Paulien van Deutekom	Renate Groenewold	Renate Groenewold	
2010	Heerenveen	Annette Gerritsen	Annette Gerritsen	Annette Gerritsen	Ireen Wüst	Renate Groenewold	
2011	Heerenveen	Margot Boer	Marrit Leenstra	Ireen Wüst	Ireen Wüst	Moniek Kleinsman	
2012	Heerenveen	Thijsje Oenema	Thijsje Oenema	Ireen Wüst	Pien Keulstra	Pien Keulstra	
2013	Heerenveen	Thijsje Oenema	Marrit Leenstra	Ireen Wüst	Diane Valkenburg	Marije Joling	Irene Schouten
2014	Heerenveen	Margot Boer	Marrit Leenstra	Jorien ter Mors	Ireen Wüst	Yvonne Nauta	Irene Schouten
2015	Heerenveen	Margot Boer	Marrit Leenstra	Ireen Wüst	Ireen Wüst	Carien Kleibeuker	Irene Schouten
2016	Heerenveen	Margot Boer	Jorien ter Mors	Jorien ter Mors	Ireen Wüst	Carien Kleibeuker	Irene Schouten
2017	Heerenveen	Jorien ter Mors	Jorien ter Mors	Ireen Wüst	Ireen Wüst	Carien Kleibeuker	Irene Schouten
2018	Heerenveen	Jorien ter Mors	Jorien ter Mors	Jorien ter Mors	Antoinette de Jong	Antoinette de Jong	Annouk van der Weijden
2019	Heerenveen	Janine Smit	Ireen Wüst	Ireen Wüst	Antoinette de Jong	Esmee Visser	Irene Schouten
2020	Heerenveen	Jutta Leerdam	Jutta Leerdam	Melissa Wijfje	Esmee Visser	Esmee Visser	Irene Schouten
2021	Heerenveen	Femke Kok	Jutta Leerdam	Jorien ter Mors	Irene Schouten	Irene Schouten	cancelled
2022	Heerenveen	Jutta Leerdam	Jutta Leerdam	Antoinette de Jong	Irene Schouten	Irene Schouten	Irene Schouten
2023	Heerenveen	Femke Kok	Jutta Leerdam	Antoinette Rijpma-de Jong	Antoinette Rijpma-de Jong	Irene Schouten	Irene Schouten
2024	Heerenveen	Femke Kok	Jutta Leerdam	Joy Beune	Irene Schouten	Irene Schouten	Irene Schouten
2025	Heerenveen	Femke Kok	Jutta Leerdam	Marijke Groenewoud	Marijke Groenewoud	Merel Conijn	Marijke Groenewoud
2026	Heerenveen	Femke Kok	Femke Kok	Marijke Groenewoud	Merel Conijn	Merel Conijn	Marijke Groenewoud

Source: Schaatsstatistieken.nl, KNSB.nl
