= 2007 KNSB Dutch Single Distance Championships =

- Venue: De Smelt, Assen, Netherlands
- Dates: 3–5 November 2006
- Competitors: 89 with 50 men and 39 women

The 2007 KNSB Dutch Single Distance Championships took place in Assen at De Smelt ice rink on 3–5 November 2006. Although this tournament was held in 2006 it was the 2006 edition as it was part of the 2006–2007 speed skating season.

== Schedule ==
Schedule
Date	Distances
3 November 2006	Women's 500 meter 1st run Men's 500 meter 1st run Men's 5000 meter Women's 500 meter 2nd run Men's 500 meter 2nd run
4 November 2006	Women's 1000 meter Men's 1000 meter Women's 3000 meter
5 November 2006	Women's 1500 meter Men's 1500 meter Women's 5000 meter Men's 10,000 meter

== Medalists ==
=== Men ===
Distance	Gold		Silver		Bronze	
2x500 m details	Jan Bos	72.730 (36.51/36.22)	Jan Smeekens	72.770 (36,26/36,51)	Erben Wennemars	72.930 (36,28/36,65)
1000 m details	Jan Bos	1:11.36	Stefan Groothuis	1:11.52	Beorn Nijenhuis	1:11.70
1500 m details	Sven Kramer	1:50.96	Simon Kuipers	1:51.30	Jan Bos	1:51.41
5000 m details	Sven Kramer	6:31.34 TR	Carl Verheijen	6:32.64	Bob de Jong	6:42.24
10,000 m details	Sven Kramer	13:32.70 TR	Carl Verheijen	13:39.59	Bob de Jong	13:53.58

Source: www.schaatsen.nl & SchaatsStatistieken.nl

Notes:
500m Smeekens surprised by winning the first race, Bos won the second race and overall classification. Simon Kuipers and Beorn Nijenhuis fell during the second race.
1000m Jan Bos claims his second title of the Championships and his fifth title in two years.
1500m Sven Kramer claims his second title of the Championships, while Bos was unable to defend the third of the three titles he won in 2005.
5000m Defending champion Verheijen broke the track record before being overtaken by Kramer in the last pairings.
10,000m Sven Kramer was named King of the Championships after his third title in a new track record.

=== Women ===
Distance	Gold		Silver		Bronze	
2x500 m details	Margot Boer	79.570 (39.86/39.71)	Marianne Timmer	80.070 (40.15/39.92)	Annette Gerritsen	80.430 (40.31/40.12)
1000 m details	Ireen Wüst	1:18.88 TR	Annette Gerritsen	1:20.63	Marianne Timmer	1:20.73
1500 m details	Ireen Wüst	2:02.84 TR	Renate Groenewold	2:05.21	Paulien van Deutekom	2:06.69
3000 m details	Renate Groenewold	4:14.98 TR	Ireen Wüst	4:15.38	Paulien van Deutekom	4:18.44
5000 m details	Gretha Smit	7:32.57 TR	Tessa van Dijk	7:37.28	Carien Kleibeuker	7:39.74

Source: www.schaatsen.nl & SchaatsStatistieken.nl

Notes:
500m Boer surprised Timmer by unexpectedly winning both races overtaking all the favourites with a fair distance. Gerritsen who had the best pre-season disappointed.
1000m Wüst successfully defended her title beating her opponents with a huge difference and a track record.
1500m Wüst became Queen of the Championships with her third title. She finished way ahead of the other competitors, from who Renate Groenewold turned out to be the best.
3000m Groenewold beats defending and 2006 Winter Olympics champion Wüst by less than a second, but in a new track record.
5000m Smit took revenge on her weak 3000 m earlier in the week while the top-3 of that distance didn't participate in the 5000 m. Defending champion Kleibeuker won the bronze.

== Men's results (details) ==
=== 500 m ===
Place	1st race	Time	Place	2nd race	Time	Place	Classification	Points
1.	Jan Smeekens	36,26	1.	Jan Bos	36,22	1st place, gold medalist(s)	Jan Bos	72.730
2.	Erben Wennemars	36,28	2.	Jan Smeekens	36,51	2nd place, silver medalist(s)	Jan Smeekens	72.770
3.	Simon Kuipers	36,29	3.	Gerard van Velde	36,52	3rd place, bronze medalist(s)	Erben Wennemars	72.930
4.	Beorn Nijenhuis	36,43	4.	Lars Elgersma	36,59	4.	Gerard van Velde	73.050
5.	Stefan Groothuis	36,46	5.	Erben Wennemars	36,65	5.	Lars Elgersma	73.230
6.	Jan Bos	36,51	6.	Jacques de Koning	36,82	6.	Stefan Groothuis	73.300
7.	Gerard van Velde	36,53	7.	Stefan Groothuis	36,84	7.	Jacques de Koning	73.590
8.	Lars Elgersma	36,64	8.	Remco olde Heuvel	37,01	8.	Tim Salomons	74.100
9.	Jacques de Koning	36,77	9.	Tim Salomons	37,08	9.	Alexander Oltrop	74.110
10.	Alexander Oltrop	36,97	10.	Alexander Oltrop	37,14	10.	Remco olde Heuvel	74.115

=== 1000 m ===
Place	Athlete	Time
1st place, gold medalist(s)	Jan Bos	1.11,36
2nd place, silver medalist(s)	Stefan Groothuis	1.11,52
3rd place, bronze medalist(s)	Beorn Nijenhuis	1.11,70
4.	Simon Kuipers	1.11,79
5.	Mark Tuitert	1.11,83
6.	Remco olde Heuvel	1.11,92
7.	Erben Wennemars	1.12,38
8.	Lars Elgersma	1.12,48
9.	Gerard van Velde	1.12,64
10.	Rhian Ket	1.12,89

=== 1500 m ===
Place	Athlete	Time
1st place, gold medalist(s)	Sven Kramer	1.50,96
2nd place, silver medalist(s)	Simon Kuipers	1.51,30
3rd place, bronze medalist(s)	Jan Bos	1.51,41
4.	Erben Wennemars	1.51,45
5.	Carl Verheijen	1.51,81
6.	Rhian Ket	1.52,60
7.	Beorn Nijenhuis	1.52,78
8.	Stefan Groothuis	1.52,95
	Remco olde Heuvel	1.52,95
10.	Ben Jongejan	1.53,67

=== 5000 m ===
Place	Athlete	Time
1st place, gold medalist(s)	Sven Kramer	TR 6.31,34
2nd place, silver medalist(s)	Carl Verheijen	6.32,64
3rd place, bronze medalist(s)	Bob de Jong	6.42,24
4.	Brigt Rykkje	6.42,85
5.	Mark Tuitert	6.43,87
6.	Arjen van der Kieft	6.45,78
7.	Boris Kucsmirak	6.47,56
8.	Ben Jongejan	6.47,93
9.	Jochem Uytdehaage	6.48,91
10.	Mark Ooijevaar	6.49,32

=== 10000 m ===
Place	Athlete	Time
1st place, gold medalist(s)	Sven Kramer	TR 13.32,70
2nd place, silver medalist(s)	Carl Verheijen	13.39,59
3rd place, bronze medalist(s)	Bob de Jong	13.53,58
4.	Arjen van der Kieft	14.01,32
5.	Brigt Rykkje	13.57,90
6.	Kurt Wubben	14.03,43
7.	Mark Ooijevaar	14.13,34
8.	Jochem Uytdehaage	14.19,12
9.	Bjarne Rykkje	14.23,03
10.	Sicco Janmaat	14.26,75

== Women's results (details) ==
=== 500 m ===
Place	1st race	Time	Place	2nd race	Time	Place	Classification	Points
1.	Margot Boer	39,86	1.	Margot Boer	39,71	1st place, gold medalist(s)	Margot Boer	79.570
2.	Marianne Timmer	40,15	2.	Marianne Timmer	39,92	2nd place, silver medalist(s)	Marianne Timmer	80.070
3.	Annette Gerritsen	40,31	3.	Annette Gerritsen	40,12	3rd place, bronze medalist(s)	Annette Gerritsen	80.430
4.	Ireen Wüst	40,45	4.	Ireen Wüst	40,32	4.	Ireen Wüst	70.770
5.	Laurine van Riessen	41,03	5.	Jorien Kranenborg	41,15	5.	Laurine van Riessen	82.250
6.	Marieke Wijsman	41,17	6.	Mayon Kuipers	41,21	6.	Marieke Wijsman	82.390
7.	Jorien Kranenborg	41,28	7.	Laurine van Riessen	41,22	7.	Jorien Kranenborg	82.430
8.	Sanne van der Star	43,34		Marieke Wijsman	41,22	8.	Mayon Kuipers	82.600
9.	Mayon Kuipers	41,39	9.	Sanne van der Star	41,26		Sanne van der Star	82.600
10.	Thijsje Oenema	41,47	10.	Frederika Buwalda	41,52	10.	Els Murris	83.110

=== 1000 m ===
Place	Athlete	Time
1st place, gold medalist(s)	Ireen Wüst	TR 1.18,88
2nd place, silver medalist(s)	Annette Gerritsen	1.20,63
3rd place, bronze medalist(s)	Marianne Timmer	1.20,73
4.	Paulien van Deutekom	1.20,78
5.	Margot Boer	1.20,90
6.	Wieteke Cramer	1.21,05
7.	Tessa van Dijk	1.21,96
8.	Els Murris	1.22,09
9.	Sophie Nijman	1.22,80
10.	Helga Luning	1.22,83

=== 1500 m ===
Place	Athlete	Time
1st place, gold medalist(s)	Ireen Wüst	TR 2.02,84
2nd place, silver medalist(s)	Renate Groenewold	2.05,21
3rd place, bronze medalist(s)	Paulien van Deutekom	2.06,69
4.	Tessa van Dijk	2.06,70
5.	Margot Boer	2.06,81
6.	Marja Vis	2.07,72
7.	Jorien Voorhuis	2.07,99
8.	Laurine van Riessen	2.08,43
9.	Marrit Leenstra	2.09,45
10.	Janneke Ensing	2.09,71

=== 3000 m ===
Place	Athlete	Time
1st place, gold medalist(s)	Renate Groenewold	TR 4.14,98
2nd place, silver medalist(s)	Ireen Wüst	4.15,38
3rd place, bronze medalist(s)	Paulien van Deutekom	4.18,44
4.	Marja Vis	4.18,94
5.	Tessa van Dijk	4.20,22
6.	Wieteke Cramer	4.21,24
7.	Elma de Vries	4.21,29
8.	Gretha Smit	4.21,52
9.	Moniek Kleinsman	4.22,37
10.	Carien Kleibeuker	4.22,81

=== 5000 m ===
Place	Athlete	Time
1st place, gold medalist(s)	Gretha Smit	7.32,57
2nd place, silver medalist(s)	Tessa van Dijk	7.37,28
3rd place, bronze medalist(s)	Carien Kleibeuker	7.39,74
4.	Marja Vis	7.42,12
5.	Wieteke Cramer	7.42,90
6.	Elma de Vries	7.44,16
7.	Jorien Voorhuis	7.48,94
8.	Moniek Kleinsman	7.54,21
