= 2010 KNSB Dutch Single Distance Championships =

KNSB Dutch Single Distance Championships
- Venue: Thialf, Heerenveen
- Dates: 30 October - 1 November 2009

The 2010 KNSB Dutch Single Distance Championships were held at the Thialf ice stadium in Heerenveen from Friday October 30 until Sunday November 1, 2009. Although the tournament was held in 2009 it was the 2010 edition as it is part of the 2009/2010 speed skating season.

== Schedule ==
Schedule
Date	Time	Distance
Friday; 30 October 2009	14:30	Men's 500 meter 1st run Women's 500 meter 1st run Men's 500 meter 2nd run Women's 500 meter 2nd run Men's 5000 meter
Saturday; 31 October 2009	14:15	Women's 1000 meter Men's 1000 meter Women's 3000 meter
Sunday; 1 November 2009	12:30	Women's 1500 meter Men's 1500 meter Women's 5000 meter Men's 10,000 meter

== Medalists ==
=== Men ===
Distance	Gold		Silver		Bronze	
2x500 m details	Jan Smeekens; DSB	70.780 (35.23/35.55)	Ronald Mulder; APPM	70.800 (35.47/35.33)	Mark Tuitert; DSB	71.010 (35.54/35.47)
1000 m details	Stefan Groothuis; DSB	1:09.30	Simon Kuipers; DSB	1:09.53	Mark Tuitert; DSB	1:09.57
1500 m details	Rhian Ket; APPM	1:45.89 PR	Mark Tuitert; DSB	1:46.19	Stefan Groothuis; DSB	1:46.39
5000 m details	Sven Kramer; TVM	6:20.71	Bob de Jong; VPZ	6:23.13	Wouter olde Heuvel; TVM	6:25.33
10000 m details	Sven Kramer; TVM	13:04.55	Bob de Jong; VPZ	13:06.61	Carl Verheijen; TVM	13:11.81

Source: SchaatsStatistieken.nl

=== Women ===
Distance	Gold		Silver		Bronze	
2x500 m details	Annette Gerritsen; DSB	76.880 (38.51/38.37)	Margot Boer; DSB	77.070 (38.44/38.63)	Marianne Timmer; DSB	77.760 (38.78/38.98)
1000 m details	Annette Gerritsen; DSB	1:16.83	Margot Boer; DSB	1:17.18	Marianne Timmer; DSB	1:17.26
1500 m details	Annette Gerritsen; DSB	1:58.69	Ireen Wüst; TVM	1:58,93	Diane Valkenburg; VPZ	1:59.29
3000 m details	Ireen Wüst; TVM	4:11.52	Renate Groenewold; TVM	4:12.46	Diane Valkenburg; VPZ	4:13.30
5000 m details	Renate Groenewold; TVM	7:14.91	Moniek Kleinsman; Gewest Zuid-Holland	7:17.23	Gretha Smit; Hofmeier	7:19.18

Source: SchaatsStatistieken.nl
