= 2010 KNSB Dutch Single Distance Championships – Women's 5000 m =

- Venue: Thialf, Heerenveen, Netherlands
- Date: 1 November 2009
- Competitors: 10 skaters

Medalist men
1st place, gold medalist(s)		Renate Groenewold	NED
2nd place, silver medalist(s)		Moniek Kleinsman	NED
3rd place, bronze medalist(s)		Gretha Smit	NED

The women's 5000 meter at the 2010 KNSB Dutch Single Distance Championships took place in Heerenveen at the Thialf ice skating rink on Sunday 1 November 2009. Although this tournament was held in 2009, it was part of the 2009–2010 speed skating season.

There were 10 participants. There was a qualification selection incentive for the next following 2009–10 ISU Speed Skating World Cup tournaments.

Title holder was Renate Groenewold.

== Overview ==
=== Result ===
Rank	Skater	Time
1st place, gold medalist(s)	Renate Groenewold	7:14.91
2nd place, silver medalist(s)	Moniek Kleinsman	7:17.23
3rd place, bronze medalist(s)	Gretha Smit	7:19.18
4	Elma de Vries	7:20.46
5	Annouk van der Weijden	7:21.30
6	Yvonne Nauta	7:24.34
7	Maria Sterk	7:24.51 PR
8	Marja Vis	7:29.15
9	Linda Bouwens	7:32.85
10	Janneke Ensing	7:33.85

=== Draw ===
Heat	Inner lane	Outer lane
1	Yvonne Nauta	Janneke Ensing
2	Maria Sterk	Moniek Kleinsman
3	Linda Bouwens	Gretha Smit
4	Annouk van der Weijden	Marja Vis
5	Renate Groenewold	Elma de Vries
