= 2003 World Sprint Speed Skating Championships =

International speed skating competition

The 34th World Sprint Speed Skating Championships took place in Calgary, Canada (Olympic Oval) on the 18th the 19th of January, 2003.

== Competition ==
- 66 athletes from 14 countries took part in multiple events

| Belarus; Canada; China, People's Republic of Finland; Germany; Hungary; Italy | Japan; Korean Republic; Netherlands; Norway; Poland; Russia; United States |

=== Women ===
==== Final standings ====
Table shows the 12 highest finishing athletes at the Championships

| Pos. | Country | Name of Athlete | 1st Race 500m | Pts. | 1st Race 1,000m | Pts. | 2nd Race 500m | Pts. | 2nd Race 1.000m | Pts. | Total |
|---|---|---|---|---|---|---|---|---|---|---|---|
| 1 | Germany | Monique Garbrecht-Enfeldt | 37,76 (1) | 37,76 | 1:14,89 (1) | 37,44 | 37,75 (1) | 37,75 | 1:14,54 (1) | 37,27 | 150,225 |
| 2 | Canada | Cindy Klassen | 38,58 (10) | 38,58 | 1:15,16 (3) | 37,58 | 38,41 (11) | 38,41 | 1:14,71 (2) | 37,35 | 151,925 |
| 3 | Japan | Shihomi Shinya | 38,09 (3) | 38,09 | 1:15,57 (5) | 37,78 | 38,05 (3) | 38,05 | 1:16,11 (9) | 38,05 | 151,980 |
| 4 | China | Wang Manli | 37,82 (2) | 37,82 | 1:16,18 (8) | 38,09 | 37,96 (2) | 37,96 | 1:16,23 (10) | 38,11 | 151,985 |
| 5 | United States | Jennifer Rodriguez | 38,52 (9) | 38,52 | 1:15,05 (2) | 37,52 | 38,78 (16) | 38,78 | 1:14,97 (3) | 37,48 | 152,310 |
| 6 | Belarus | Anzhelika Kotyuga | 38,47 (8) | 38,47 | 1:15,83 (6) | 37,91 | 38,33 (9) | 38,33 | 1:15,55 (4) | 37,77 | 152,490 |
| 7 | Canada | Catriona LeMay Doan | 38,16 (5) | 38,16 | 1:15,92 (7) | 37,96 | 38,13 (6) | 38,13 | 1:17,06 (16) | 38,53 | 152,780 |
| 8 | Netherlands | Marianne Timmer | 39,06 (20) | 39,06 | 1:15,42 (4) | 37,71 | 38,34 (10) | 38,34 | 1:15,57 (5) | 37,78 | 152,895 |
| 9 | Japan | Sayuri Osuga | 38,14 (4) | 38,14 | 1:16,72 (13) | 38,36 | 38,10 (5) | 38,10 | 1:17,01 (15) | 38,50 | 153,105 |
| 10 | Netherlands | Andrea Nuyt | 38,33 (6) | 38,33 | 1:16,54 (11) | 38,27 | 38,25 (7) | 38,25 | 1:16,52 (12) | 38,26 | 153,110 |
| 11 | Germany | Pamela Zoellner | 38,72 (12) | 38,72 | 1:16,66 (12) | 38,33 | 38,32 (8) | 38,32 | 1:15,87 (7) | 37,93 | 153,305 |
| 12 | United States | Becky Sundstrom | 38,74 (13) | 38,74 | 1:16,34 (10) | 38,17 | 38,76 (14) | 38,76 | 1:15,67 (6) | 37,83 | 153,505 |

==== 1st Race - 500m ====
| Pos | Name | Country | Time | Points |
|---|---|---|---|---|
| 1 | Monique Garbrecht-Enfeldt | Germany | 37,76 | 37,76 |
| 2 | Wang Manli | China | 37,82 | 37,82 |
| 3 | Shihomi Shinya | Japan | 38,09 | 38,09 |
| 4 | Sayuri Osuga | Japan | 38,14 | 38,14 |
| 5 | Catriona LeMay-Doan | Canada | 38,16 | 38,16 |
| 6 | Andrea Nuyt | Netherlands | 38,33 | 38,33 |
| 7 | Svetlana Zhurova | Russia | 38,44 | 38,44 |
| 8 | Anzhelika Kotyuga | Belarus | 38,47 | 38,47 |
| 9 | Jennifer Rodriguez | United States | 38,52 | 38,52 |
| 10 | Cindy Klassen | Canada | 38,58 | 38,58 |
| 11 | Jenny Wolf | Germany | 38,60 | 38,60 |
| 12 | Pamela Zoellner | Germany | 38,72 | 38,72 |
| 25 | Heike Hartmann | Germany | 39,50 | 39,50 |

==== 1st Race - 1,000m ====
| Pos | Name | Country | Time | Points |
|---|---|---|---|---|
| 1 | Monique Garbrecht-Enfeldt | Germany | 1:14,89 | 37,44 |
| 2 | Jennifer Rodriguez | United States | 1:15,05 | 37,52 |
| 3 | Cindy Klassen | Canada | 1:15,16 | 37,58 |
| 4 | Marianne Timmer | Netherlands | 1:15,42 | 37,71 |
| 5 | Shihomi Shinya | Japan | 1:15,57 | 37,78 |
| 6 | Anzhelika Kotyuga | Belarus | 1:15,83 | 37,91 |
| 7 | Catriona LeMay-Doan | Canada | 1:15,92 | 37,96 |
| 8 | Wang Manli | China | 1:16,18 | 38,09 |
| 9 | Chris Witty | United States | 1:16,33 | 38,16 |
| 10 | Becky Sundstrom | United States | 1:16,34 | 38,17 |
| 12 | Pamela Zoellner | Germany | 1:16,66 | 38,33 |
| 16 | Heike Hartmann | Germany | 1:17,42 | 38,71 |
| 26 | Jenny Wolf | Germany | 1:18,87 | 39,43 |

==== 2nd Race - 500m ====
| Pos | Name | Country | Time | Points |
|---|---|---|---|---|
| 1 | Monique Garbrecht-Enfeldt | Germany | 37,75 | 37,75 |
| 2 | Wang Manli | China | 37,96 | 37,96 |
| 3 | Shihomi Shinya | Japan | 38,05 | 38,05 |
| 4 | Jenny Wolf | Germany | 38,06 | 38,06 |
| 5 | Sayuri Osuga | Japan | 38,10 | 38,10 |
| 6 | Catriona LeMay-Doan | Canada | 38,13 | 38,13 |
| 7 | Andrea Nuyt | Netherlands | 38,25 | 38,25 |
| 8 | Pamela Zoellner | Germany | 38,32 | 38,32 |
| 9 | Anzhelika Kotyuga | Belarus | 38,33 | 38,33 |
| 10 | Marianne Timmer | Netherlands | 38,34 | 38,34 |
| 25 | Heike Hartmann | Germany | 39,15 | 39,15 |

==== 2nd Race - 1,000m ====
| Pos | Name | Country | Time | Points |
|---|---|---|---|---|
| 1 | Monique Garbrecht-Enfeldt | Germany | 1:14,54 | 37,27 |
| 2 | Cindy Klassen | Canada | 1:14,71 | 37,35 |
| 3 | Jennifer Rodriguez | United States | 1:14,97 | 37,48 |
| 4 | Anzhelika Kotyuga | Belarus | 1:15,55 | 37,77 |
| 5 | Marianne Timmer | Netherlands | 1:15,57 | 37,78 |
| 6 | Becky Sundstrom | United States | 1:15,67 | 37,83 |
| 7 | Pamela Zoellner | Germany | 1:15,87 | 37,93 |
| 8 | Chris Witty | United States | 1:15,90 | 37,95 |
| 9 | Shihomi Shinya | Japan | 1:16,11 | 38,05 |
| 10 | Wang Manli | China | 1:16,23 | 38,11 |
| 17 | Heike Hartmann | Germany | 1:17,30 | 38,65 |
| 19 | Jenny Wolf | Germany | 1:17,43 | 38,71 |

=== Men ===
==== Final standings ====
- Shows the top 12 male athletes at the Championships

| Pos | Country | Name of Athlete | 1st Race 500m | Pts | 1st Race 1,000m | Pts | 2nd Race 500m | Pts | 2nd Race 1,000m | Pts | Total |
|---|---|---|---|---|---|---|---|---|---|---|---|
| 1 | Canada | Jeremy Wotherspoon | 34,41 (1) | 34,41 | 1:08,41 (2) | 34,20 | 34,49 (1) | 34,49 | 1:08,25 (3) | 34,12 | 137,230WR |
| 2 | Netherlands | Gerard van Velde | 34,68 (3) | 34,68 | 1:08,65 (4) | 34,32 | 34,61 (2) | 34,61 | 1:08,43 (4) | 34,21 | 137,830 |
| 3 | Netherlands | Erben Wennemars | 35,00 (4) | 35,00 | 1:08,40 (1) | 34,20 | 34,96 (5) | 34,96 | 1:07,98 (2) | 33,99 | 138,150 |
| 4 | United States | Joey Cheek | 35,10 (5) | 35,10 | 1:08,57 (3) | 34,28 | 34,87 (4) | 34,87 | 1:07,95 (1) | 33,97 | 138,230 |
| 5 | Japan | Hiroyasu Shimizu | 34,52 (2) | 34,52 | 1:09,28 (12) | 34,64 | 34,67 (3) | 34,67 | 1:09,07 (10) | 34,53 | 138,365 |
| 6 | South Korea | Lee Kyou-hyeok | 35,22 (7) | 35,22 | 1:08,81 (5) | 34,40 | 35,08 (8) | 35,08 | 1:08,76 (6) | 34,38 | 139,085 |
| 7 | Netherlands | Jan Bos | 35,30 (11) | 35,30 | 1:09,00 (6) | 34,50 | 35,01 (7) | 35,01 | 1:08,81 (7) | 34,40 | 139,215 |
| 8 | United States | Kip Carpenter | 35,22 (7) | 35,22 | 1:09,05 (8) | 34,52 | 35,17 (9) | 35,17 | 1:09,00 (9) | 34,50 | 139,415 |
| 9 | Canada | Mike Ireland | 35,13 (6) | 35,13 | 1:09,22 (11) | 34,61 | 34,99 (6) | 34,99 | 1:09,59 (14) | 34,79 | 139,525 |
| 10 | Finland | Janne Hänninen | 35,40 (14) | 35,40 | 1:09,03 (7) | 34,51 | 35,20 (11) | 35,20 | 1:08,87 (8) | 34,43 | 139,550 |
| 11 | Netherlands | Beorn Nijenhuis | 35,29 (10) | 35,29 | 1:09,21 (9) | 34,60 | 35,59 (15) | 35,59 | 1:08,53 (5) (JWR) | 34,26 | 139,750 (JWR) |
| 12 | South Korea | Choi Jae-bong | 35,38 (13) | 35,38 | 1:09,91 (15) | 34,95 | 35,39 (13) | 35,39 | 1:09,63 (15) | 34,81 | 140,540 |

- JWR = Junior World Record

==== 1st Race - 500m ====
| Pos | Name | Country | Time | Points |
|---|---|---|---|---|
| 1 | Jeremy Wotherspoon | Canada | 34,41 | 34,41 |
| 2 | Hiroyasu Shimizu | Japan | 34,52 | 34,52 |
| 3 | Gerard van Velde | Netherlands | 34,68 | 34,68 |
| 4 | Erben Wennemars | Netherlands | 35,00 | 35,00 |
| 5 | Joey Cheek | United States | 35,10 | 35,10 |
| 6 | Mike Ireland | Canada | 35,13 | 35,13 |
| 7 | Lee Kyou-hyeok Kip Carpenter | South Korea United States | 35,22 | 35,22 |
| 9 | Masaaki Kobayashi | Japan | 35,27 | 35,27 |
| 10 | Beorn Nijenhuis | Netherlands | 35,29 | 35,29 |
| 26 | Andreas Behr | Germany | 36,16 | 36,16 |

==== 1st Race - 1,000m ====
| Pos | Name | Country | Time | Points |
|---|---|---|---|---|
| 1 | Erben Wennemars | Netherlands | 1:08,40 | 34,20 |
| 2 | Jeremy Wotherspoon | Canada | 1:08,41 | 34,20 |
| 3 | Joey Cheek | United States | 1:08,57 | 34,28 |
| 4 | Gerard van Velde | Netherlands | 1:08,65 | 34,32 |
| 5 | Lee Kyu-hyeok | South Korea | 1:08,81 | 34,40 |
| 6 | Jan Bos | Netherlands | 1:09,00 | 34,50 |
| 7 | Janne Hänninen | Finland | 1:09,03 | 34,51 |
| 8 | Kip Carpenter | United States | 1:09,05 | 34,52 |
| 9 | Beorn Nijenhuis Chris Callis | Netherlands United States | 1:09,21 | 34,60 |
| 22 | Christian Breuer | Germany | 1:11,27 | 35,63 |
| 28 | Andreas Behr | Germany | 1:12,10 | 36,05 |

==== 2nd Race - 500m ====
| Pos | Name | Country | Time | Points |
|---|---|---|---|---|
| 1 | Jeremy Wotherspoon | Canada | 34,49 | 34,49 |
| 2 | Gerard van Velde | Netherlands | 34,61 | 34,61 |
| 3 | Hiroyasu Shimizu | Japan | 34,67 | 34,67 |
| 4 | Joey Cheek | United States | 34,87 | 34,87 |
| 5 | Erben Wennemars | Netherlands | 34,96 | 34,96 |
| 6 | Mike Ireland | Canada | 34,99 | 34,99 |
| 7 | Jan Bos | Netherlands | 35,01 | 35,01 |
| 8 | Lee Kyu-hyeok | South Korea | 35,08 | 35,08 |
| 9 | Kip Carpenter Dmitri Lobkow | United States Russia | 35,17 | 35,17 |
| 24 | Christian Breuer | Germany | 36,02 | 36,02 |
| 26 | Andreas Behr | Germany | 36,03 | 36,03 |

==== 2nd Race - 1,000m ====
| Platz | Name | Land | Zeit | Punkte |
|---|---|---|---|---|
| 1 | Joey Cheek | United States | 1:07,95 | 33,97 |
| 2 | Erben Wennemars | Netherlands | 1:07,98 | 33,99 |
| 3 | Jeremy Wotherspoon | Canada | 1:08,25 | 34,12 |
| 4 | Gerard van Velde | Netherlands | 1:08,43 | 34,21 |
| 5 | Beorn Nijenhuis | Netherlands | 1:08,53 (JWR) | 34,26 |
| 6 | Lee Kyu-hyeok | South Korea | 1:08,76 | 34,38 |
| 7 | Jan Bos | Netherlands | 1:08,81 | 34,40 |
| 8 | Janne Hänninen | Finland | 1:08,87 | 34,43 |
| 9 | Kip Carpenter | United States | 1:09,00 | 34,50 |
| 10 | Hiroyasu Shimizu | Japan | 1:09,07 | 34,53 |
| 26 | Christian Breuer | Germany | 1:11,59 | 35,79 |
| 29 | Andreas Behr | Germany | 1:11,95 | 35,97 |

- JWR = Junior World Record
