= 2006 KNSB Dutch Single Distance Championships =

- Venue: Thialf, Heerenveen, Netherland
- Dates: 27–30 December 2005
- Competitors: 101 skaters with 56 men and 45 women

The 2006 KNSB Dutch Single Distance Championships took place in Heerenveen at the Thialf ice rink on 27–30 December 2005. Although this tournament was held in 2005 it was the 2006 edition as it was part of the 2005–2006 speed skating season.

== Schedule ==
Schedule
| Date | Distance |
| 27 December 2005 | Women's 1500 meter Men's 5000 meter |
| 28 December 2005 | Women's 3000 meter Men's 500 meter 1st run Men's 500 meter 2nd run |
| 29 December 2005 | Men's 1000 meter Women's 500 meter 1st run Women's 500 meter 2nd run Men's 10,000 meter |
| 30 December 2005 | Women's 1000 meter Men's 1500 meter Women's 5000 meter |

== Medalists ==
=== Men ===
| Event | Gold | | Silver | | Bronze | |
|---|---|---|---|---|---|---|
| 2x500 m details | Jan Bos | 70.950 | Beorn Nijenhuis | 71.200 | Erben Wennemars | 71.240 |
| 1000 m details | Jan Bos | 1:09.08 | Erben Wennemars | 1:09.58 | Beorn Nijenhuis | 1.09.61 |
| 1500 m details | Jan Bos | 1:46.56 | Erben Wennemars | 1:46.84 | Sven Kramer | 1:46.88 |
| 5000 m details | Carl Verheijen | 6:17.58 | Sven Kramer | 6:18.78 | Bob de Jong | 6:22.38 |
| 10000 m details | Carl Verheijen | 13:00.27 | Sven Kramer | 13:05.59 | Bob de Jong | 13:22.58 |

Source: www.schaatsen.nl & SchaatsStatistieken.nl

=== Women ===
| Event | Gold | | Silver | | Bronze | |
|---|---|---|---|---|---|---|
| 2x500 m details | Marianne Timmer | 77.170 | Annette Gerritsen | 77.700 | Sanne van der Star | 78.110 |
| 1000 m details | Ireen Wüst | 1:15.83 | Marianne Timmer | 1:16.65 | Annette Gerritsen | 1:17.22 |
| 1500 m details | Ireen Wüst | 1:56.71 | Paulien van Deutekom | 1:58.93 | Renate Groenewold | 1:59.00 |
| 3000 m details | Ireen Wüst | 4:04.33 | Renate Groenewold | 4:04.64 | Moniek Kleinsman | 4:07.03 |
| 5000 m details | Carien Kleibeuker | 7:02.38 | Renate Groenewold | 7:05.85 | Gretha Smit | 7:06.08 |

Source: www.schaatsen.nl & SchaatsStatistieken.nl
