= 2008 KNSB Dutch Single Distance Championships =

Speed skating competition

- Venue: Thialf, Heerenveen, Netherlands
- Dates: 26–28 October 2007
- Competitors: 99 skaters with 57 men and 42 women

The 2008 KNSB Dutch Single Distance Championships took place in Heerenveen at the Thialf ice rink on 26–28 October 2007. Although this tournament was held in 2007 it was the 2008 edition as it was part of the 2007–2008 speed skating season.

== Schedule ==
Schedule
Date	Distance
Friday; 26 October 2007	Men's 500 meter 1st run Women's 500 meter 1st run Men's 500 meter 2nd run Women's 500 meter 2nd run Men's 5000 meter
Saturday; 27 October 2007	Women's 1000 meter Men's 1000 meter Women's 3000 meter
Sunday; 28 October 2007	Women's 1500 meter Men's 1500 meter Women's 5000 meter Men's 10,000 meter

== Medalists ==
=== Men ===
Distance	Gold		Silver		Bronze	
2x500 m details	Jan Smeekens; TVM	71.220 (35.66/35.56)	Simon Kuipers; DSB	71.470 (35.74/35.73)	Erben Wennemars; TVM	71.490 (35.69/35.80)
1000 m details	Simon Kuipers; DSB	1:09.59	Jan Bos; Telfort	1:09.88	Erben Wennemars; TVM	1:10.00
1500 m details	Simon Kuipers; DSB	1:45.80	Erben Wennemars; TVM	1:46.98	Sven Kramer; TVM	1:47.31
5000 m details	Sven Kramer; TVM	6:24.51	Carl Verheijen; TVM	6:26.54	Wouter olde Heuvel; TVM	6:28.48
10000 m details	Sven Kramer; TVM	13:17.80	Bob de Jong no team	13:20.26	Brigt Rykkje no team	13:26.51

Source: www.schaatsen.nl & SchaatsStatistieken.nl

=== Women ===
Distance	Gold		Silver		Bronze	
2x500 m details	Annette Gerritsen; DSB	77.890 (39.07/38.82)	Margot Boer; DSB	78.380 (39.27/39.11)	Marianne Timmer; DSB	78.760 (39.59/39.17)
1000 m details	Paulien van Deutekom; TVM	1:17.18	Annette Gerritsen; DSB	1:17.09	Ireen Wüst; TVM	1:18.04
1500 m details	Paulien van Deutekom; TVM	1:58.26	Ireen Wüst; TVM	1:58.35	Diane Valkenburg; South Holland; Marrit Leenstra; National Youth Team	1:59.30
3000 m details	Renate Groenewold; TVM	4:09.70	Gretha Smit; Telfort	4:10.06	Paulien van Deutekom; TVM	4:11.18
5000 m details	Gretha Smit; Telfort	7:09.23	Diane Valkenburg; South Holland	7:16.91	Mireille Reitsma no team	7:21.45

Source: www.schaatsen.nl & SchaatsStatistieken.nl
