= 2010 KNSB Dutch Single Distance Championships – Women's 1500 m =

KNSB Dutch Single Distance Championships – Women's 1500 m
- Venue: Thialf, Heerenveen
- Dates: 30 October - 1 November 2009

The women's 1500 m at the 2010 KNSB Dutch Single Distance Championships in Heerenveen took place at Thialf on 1 November 2009. The top five speed skaters qualified for the 1500 m event at the 2009–10 ISU Speed Skating World Cup. Paulien van Deutekom held the title.

== Results ==
=== Final results ===
Rank	Athlete	Time
1st place, gold medalist(s)	Annette Gerritsen	1:58.69
2nd place, silver medalist(s)	Ireen Wüst	1:58.93
3rd place, bronze medalist(s)	Diane Valkenburg	1:59.29
4	Margot Boer	1:59.54
5	Natasja Bruintjes	1:59.69
6	Elma de Vries	2:00.21
7	Lotte van Beek	2:00.31 PR
8	Laurine van Riessen	2:00.50
9	Yvonne Nauta	2:00.79 PR
10	Marrit Leenstra	2:00.96
11	Ingeborg Kroon	2:01.31
12	Linda de Vries	2:01.53 PR
13	Roxanne van Hemert	2:01.66
14	Annouk van der Weijden	2:01.73
15	Jorien Voorhuis	2:01.77
16	Linda Bouwens	2:02.20 PR
17	Rixt Meijer	2:02.95 PR
18	Janneke Ensing	2:03.49
19	Marije Joling	2:04.49
20	Cindy Vergeer	2:05.38
21	Paulien van Deutekom	2:07.68
-	Marit Dekker	DNS

Notes:

PR = personal record
DNS = did not start

Source: KNSB.nl

=== Draw ===
Heat	Inner lane	Outer lane
1	Annouk van der Weijden	Ingeborg Kroon
2	Rixt Meijer	Linda de Vries
3	Cindy Vergeer	Marit Dekker
4	Margot Boer	Lotte van Beek
5	Natasja Bruintjes	Linda Bouwens
6	Yvonne Nauta	Annette Gerritsen
7	Janneke Ensing	Marije Joling
8	Paulien van Deutekom	Ireen Wüst
9	Diane Valkenburg	Marrit Leenstra
10	Roxanne van Hemert	Laurine van Riessen
11	Elma de Vries	Jorien Voorhuis

Source: KNSB.nl
