= 2003 World Championships =

2003 World Championships may refer to:

- Alpine skiing: Alpine World Ski Championships 2003
- Aquatics: 2003 World Aquatics Championships
- Athletics: 2003 World Championships in Athletics
  - Cross-country running: 2003 IAAF World Cross Country Championships
  - Road running: 2003 IAAF World Half Marathon Championships
- Badminton: 2003 IBF World Championships
- Bandy: 2003 Bandy World Championship
- Biathlon: Biathlon World Championships 2003
- Boxing: 2003 World Amateur Boxing Championships
- Curling:
  - 2003 World Men's Curling Championship
  - 2003 World Women's Curling Championship
- Darts: 2003 BDO World Darts Championship
- Darts: 2003 PDC World Darts Championship
- Figure skating: 2003 World Figure Skating Championships
- 2003 World Artistic Gymnastics Championships
- Ice hockey: 2003 Men's World Ice Hockey Championships
- Ice hockey: 2003 Women's World Ice Hockey Championships
- Netball: 2003 Netball World Championships
- Nordic skiing: FIS Nordic World Ski Championships 2003
- Speed skating:
  - Allround: 2003 World Allround Speed Skating Championships
  - Sprint: 2003 World Sprint Speed Skating Championships
  - Single distances: 2003 World Single Distance Speed Skating Championships

== See also ==
- 2003 World Cup (disambiguation)
- 2003 Continental Championships (disambiguation)
- 2003 World Junior Championships (disambiguation)
