= Ard Schenk Award =

AEGON Ard Schenk Award
- Description: Dutch speedskating award for long track speed skating
- Country: Netherlands

The AEGON Ard Schenk Award is a Dutch speedskating award, instated in 1990, named after famous Dutch speedskater Ard Schenk. Initially it was an award for the best speed skater, the marathon included. Since 2002 it is only for long track speed skating. Since 2003, the best skating teams are awarded as well.

The statue is made by Wim Jonker (an artist from Haarlem, Netherlands). The statue is based on an old action photo of Ard Schenk.

== Winners ==
Year	Skater of the year	Male skater of the year	Female skater of the year	Skate team of the year
1990	Bart Veldkamp	none existing		
1991	Dries van Wijhe	none existing		
1992	Falko Zandstra	none existing		
1993	Falko Zandstra	none existing		
1994	Rintje Ritsma	none existing		
1995	Annamarie Thomas	none existing		
1996	Rintje Ritsma	none existing		
1997	Ids Postma	none existing		
1998	Marianne Timmer	none existing		
1999	Rintje Ritsma	none existing		
2000	Gianni Romme	none existing		
2001	Gerard van Velde	none existing		
2002		Jochem Uytdehaage	Andrea Nuyt	
2003		Erben Wennemars	Gretha Smit	Sponsor Bingo Loterij
2004		Erben Wennemars	Marianne Timmer	Sponsor Loterij
2005		Erben Wennemars	Renate Groenewold	Jong Oranje
2006		Bob de Jong	Marianne Timmer	TVM
2007		Sven Kramer	Ireen Wüst	TVM
2008		Sven Kramer	Paulien van Deutekom	TVM
2009		Sven Kramer	Margot Boer	Jong Oranje
2010		Sven Kramer	Ireen Wüst	TVM
2011		Bob de Jong	Ireen Wüst	-
2012		Stefan Groothuis	Ireen Wüst	-
2013		Sven Kramer	Ireen Wüst	TVM
2014		Michel Mulder	Ireen Wüst	-
2015		Sven Kramer	Ireen Wüst	-
2016		Sven Kramer	Jorien ter Mors	-
2017		Sven Kramer	Ireen Wüst	-
2018		Kjeld Nuis	Jorien ter Mors	-
2019		Kai Verbij	Ireen Wüst	-
2020		Patrick Roest	Ireen Wüst	-
2021		Not awarded		-
2022		Thomas Krol	Irene Schouten	-
2023		Patrick Roest	Jutta Leerdam	-
2024		Patrick Roest	Irene Schouten	-

== Number of wins ==
=== Man ===
Rank	Name	Amount
1	Sven Kramer	8
2	Rintje Ritsma	3
2	Patrick Roest	3
2	Erben Wennemars	3
5	Bob de Jong	2
5	Falko Zandstra	2

=== Women ===
Rank	Name	Amount
1	Ireen Wüst	10
2	Marianne Timmer	3
3	Jorien ter Mors	2
3	Irene Schouten	2
