= De Bonte Wever =

Sports arena in Assen, Netherlands

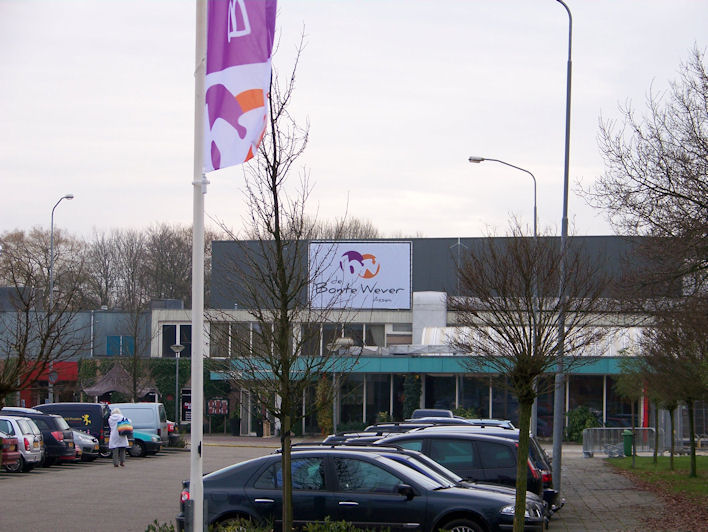
- De Bonte Wever
- Interactive map of De Bonte Wever
- Former names: De Smelt
- Location: Stadsbroek 17; Assen, Netherlands
- Coordinates: 52.983254°N 6.540792°E

De Bonte Wever (formerly De Smelt) is a sports arena located in Assen, Netherlands.

De venue opened in the 1970s with a 400-meter speed skating track. Later an ice hockey hall was added. In the early 1990s, the city of Assen became the owner of the sports complex. The speed skating track became semi-indoors and a subtropic swimming pool was added. In 2009 De Smelt was bought by Jan Smit, who changed the name to De Bonte Wever. In 2010 a hotel was built near the complex.

== Events ==
- 1973 ISU Allround World Junior Championships
- 1975 ISU Women's Allround World Championships
- 1980 ISU Allround World Junior Championships
- 1982 ISU Men's Allround World Championships
- 1984 ISU Allround World Junior Championships
- 2006-2009 Dutch Open Dance Sport Championships
- 2007 KNSB Dutch Single Distance Championships

== Track records ==
=== Speed skating ===
These are the current track records in Assen.

Men
Distance	Time	Skater	Date	Duration
500 m	36.09	Hein Otterspeer	19 November 2011	5398 days
1000 m	1:11.31	Beorn Nijenhuis	6 November 2004	7967 days
1500 m	1:49.09	Beorn Nijenhuis	7 November 2004	7966 days
3000m	3:54.30	Rhian Ket	4 February 2005	7877 days
5000 m	6:31.34	Sven Kramer	3 November 2006	7240 days
10000 m	13.32.70	Sven Kramer	3 November 2006	7240 days

Women
Distance	Time	Skater	Date	Duration
500 m	39.49	Marianne Timmer	5 November 2004	7968 days
1000 m	1:18.88	Ireen Wüst	4 November 2006	7239 days
1500 m	2:02.84	Ireen Wüst	3 November 2006	7240 days
3000 m	4:14.98	Renate Groenewold	3 November 2006	7240 days
5000 m	7:15.76	Jenita Hulzebosch	7 November 2004	7966 days
10000 m	16:30.85	Martine Oosting	22 February 1996	11147 days

=== Icetrack cycling ===
- 400 m Ice Track Cycling flying lap World Record (33,18) 2015-12-11
