= 2003 World Cup =

2003 World Cup may refer to:

- 2003 Alpine Skiing World Cup
- 2003 Cricket World Cup
- 2003 FIFA Women's World Cup
- 2003 FIVB Women's World Cup
- 2003 IFAF World Championship, an American football championship
- 2003 Rugby World Cup
- 2003 Speedway World Cup

== See also ==
- 2003 Continental Championships (disambiguation)
- 2003 World Championships (disambiguation)
- 2003 World Junior Championships (disambiguation)
