= 2003 Continental Championships =

2003 Continental Championships may refer to:

== African Championships ==
- Multisport: 2003 All-Africa Games

== Asian Championships ==
- Athletics: 2003 Asian Athletics Championships
- Football (soccer): 2002–03 AFC Champions League
- Multisport: 2003 Asian Winter Games

== European Championships ==
- Basketball: EuroBasket 2003
- Figure skating: 2003 European Figure Skating Championships
- Football (soccer): 2002–03 UEFA Champions League
- Football (soccer): 2002–03 UEFA Cup
- Football (soccer): 2003 UEFA European Under-17 Championship
- Football (soccer): 2002–03 UEFA Women's Cup
- Volleyball: 2003–04 CEV Champions League

== Oceanian Championships ==
- Football (soccer): 2003 OFC Women's Championship

== Pan American Championships/North American Championships ==
- Football (soccer): 2003 CONCACAF Champions' Cup
- Football (soccer): 2003 CONCACAF Gold Cup
- Multisport: 2003 Pan American Games

== South American Championships ==
- Football (soccer): 2003 Copa Libertadores

== See also ==
- 2003 World Championships (disambiguation)
- 2003 World Junior Championships (disambiguation)
- 2003 World Cup (disambiguation)
- Continental championship (disambiguation)
