= 2003 World Junior Championships =

2003 World Junior Championships may refer to:

- Figure skating: 2003 World Junior Figure Skating Championships
- Ice hockey: 2003 World Junior Ice Hockey Championships
- Motorcycle speedway: 2003 Individual Speedway Junior World Championship

== See also ==
- 2003 World Cup (disambiguation)
- 2003 Continental Championships (disambiguation)
- 2003 World Championships (disambiguation)
