= Gerard van Velde =

Dutch speed skater (born 1971)

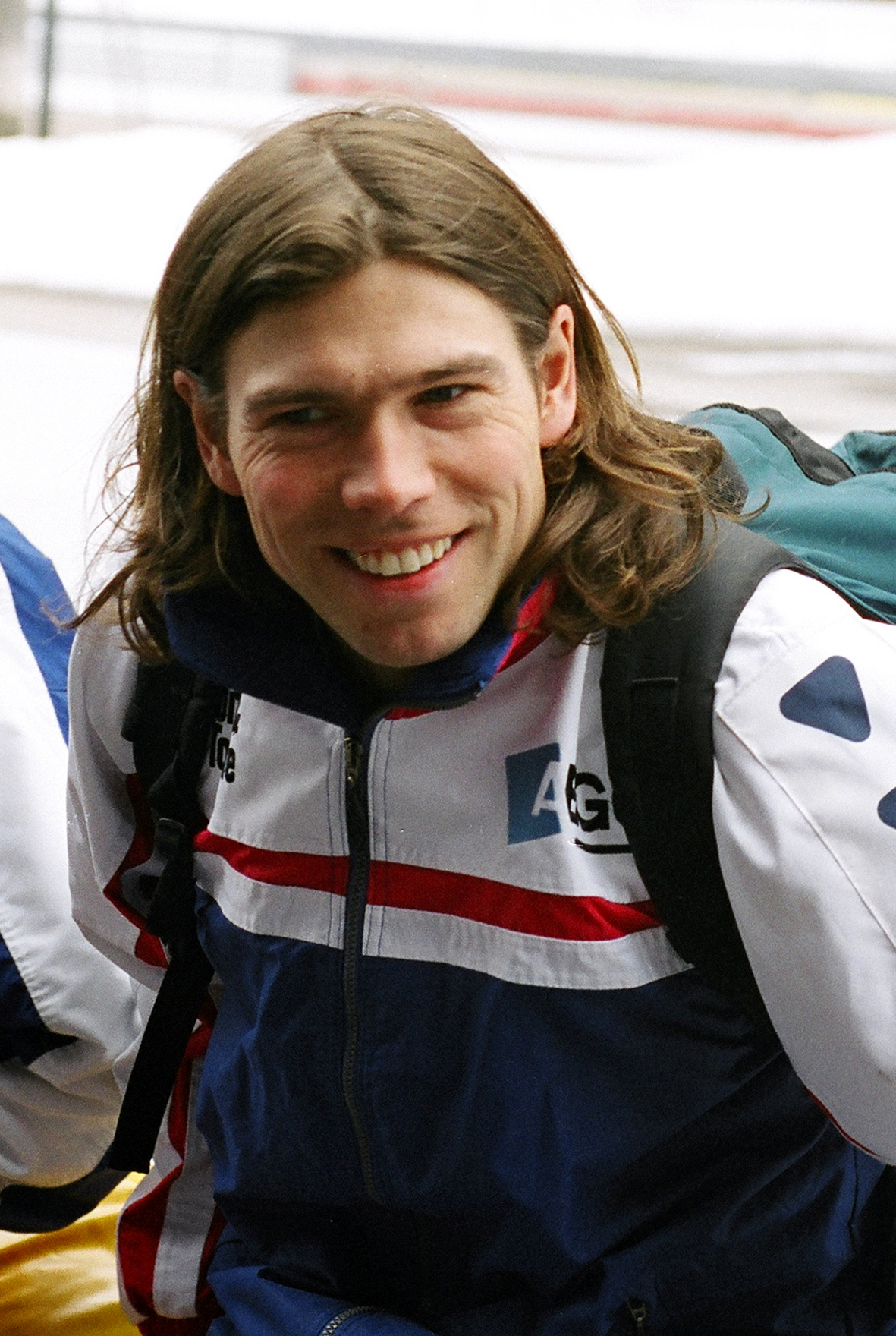

Personal information
- Born: 30 November 1971 (age 54) Wapenveld, Netherlands
- Height: 1.92 m (6 ft 4 in)
- Weight: 87 kg (192 lb)

Sport
- Country: Netherlands
- Sport: Speed skating
- Turned pro: 1990
- Retired: 2008
Medal record
Men's speed skating
Representing the Netherlands
Olympic Games
Gold medal – first place	2002 Salt Lake City	1000 m
World Sprint Championships
Silver medal – second place	2003 Calgary	Sprint
World Single Distance Championships
Silver medal – second place	2003 Berlin	1000 m

Gerard Pieter Hendrik van Velde (born 30 November 1971) is a Dutch retired speed skater who specialised in sprinting. He won an Olympic gold medal in 2002.

== Biography ==
Van Velde was considered the best Dutch sprinter during the early 1990s, but did not manage to win a medal in either the 1992 or 1994 Winter Olympics. Particularly frustrating were the 1992 Games, where he missed a bronze medal by one-hundredth of a second.

During the late 1990s, clap skates became standard in Olympic competition. Van Velde had such difficulty adjusting to the techniques required with these new skates that he retired from skating and became a car salesman. However, he was not finished with the skating world.

Rintje Ritsma, another Dutch skater invited Van Velde to be his training partner, and, during training, he mastered the clap skate techniques. He decided to try out for the 2002 Winter Olympics, in spite of the arrival of a new generation of Dutch sprinters such as Jan Bos, Erben Wennemars and Jakko Jan Leeuwangh. Van Velde became the fourth sprinter to qualify for the games.

In Salt Lake City, he started before all the other favorites and raced to a world record finish. His time of 1:07.18 shaved more than half a second from the previous best world time, and more than a second from his personal best. The skaters who followed were unable to best him, and he won the gold medal.

In December 2005, at the Dutch Olympic trials in Heerenveen, van Velde failed to qualify for the 2006 Winter Olympics in Turin. In retirement he became a coach.

== Records ==
=== Personal records ===
Personal records
Men's speed skating
Event	Result	Date	Location	Notes
500 m	34.59	6 February 2003	Calgary	
1000 m	1:07.18	16 February 2002	Salt Lake City	Olympic record
1500 m	1:48.53	26 September 2004	Calgary	
3000 m	4:02.18	30 November 2004	Calgary	

Source: SpeedskatingResults.com

=== World records ===
Event	Result	Date	Location	Notes
1000 m	1:07.18	16 February 2002	(United States) Salt Lake City	World record until 20 November 2005

Source: SpeedSkatingStats.com

== Tournament overview ==
Season	Dutch Championships Single Distances	Dutch Championships Sprint	Olympic Games	World Championships Single Distances	World Championships Sprint	World Cup GWC
1989–90	HEERENVEEN 16th 500m 17e 1000m	ASSEN 10th 500m 10th 1000m 6th 500m (bronze) 1000m 8th overall				
1990–91	THE HAGUE (gold) 500m (gold) 1000m 10 th1500m				INZELL 20th 500m 10th 1000m 16th 500m 17th 1000m 15th overall	
1991–92	HEERENVEEN (gold) 500m 4th 1000m	HEERENVEEN (gold) 500m (gold) 1000m (gold) 500m (gold) 1000m (gold) overall	ALBERTVILLE 5th 500m 4th 1000m		OSLO 9th 500m 16th 1000m 6th 500m (bronze) 1000m 6th overall	
1992–93	DEVENTER (gold) 500m (bronze) 1000m	UTRECHT (gold) 500m 5th 1000m (gold) 500m 4th 1000m (gold) overall			IKAHO 18th 500m 9th 1000m 15th 500m 8th 1000m 11th overall	
1993–94	HEERENVEEN (gold) 500m (gold) 1000m 12th 1500m	THE HAGUE (gold) 500m (gold) 1000m 13th 500m (gold) 1000m 13th overall	LILLEHAMMAR 21st 500m 9th 1000m		CALGARY 15h 500m 5th 1000m 17th 500m 33rd 1000m 30th overall	
1994–95	THE HAGUE (gold) 500m (gold) 1000m	ALKMAAR (gold) 500m (gold) 1000m (gold) 500m (gold) 1000m (gold) overall			MILWAUKEE 17th 500m 4th 1000m 11th 500m 5th 1000m 10th overall	
1995–96	GRONINGEN (gold) 500m (gold) 1000m	ASSEN (gold) 500m (gold) 1000m (gold) 500m (gold) 1000m (gold) overall		HAMAR 10th 500m 4th 1000m	HEERENVEEN 36th 500m 4th 1000m 25th 500m 10th 1000m 33rd overall	13th 500m (bronze) 1000m
1996–97		GRONINGEN (silver) 500m (silver) 1000m (gold) 500m (silver) 1000m (silver) overall		WARSAW 18th 500m 6th 1000m	HAMAR 12th 500m 10th 1000m 13th 500m 8th 1000m 11th overall	15th 500m 6th 1000m
1997–98	HEERENVEEN 4th 500m 7th 1000m	GRONINGEN 7th 500m 7th 1000m 7th 500m 10th 1000m 6th overall		CALGARY NS2 500m		44th 500m 23rd 1000m
1998–99						
1999–2000	DEVENTER (bronze) 500m 5th 1000m	UTRECHT (bronze) 500m 4th 1000m 4th 500m 4th 1000m (bronze) overall		NAGANO 19th 500m	SEOUL 22nd 500m 19th 1000m 20th 500m 23rd 1000m 21st overall	32nd 500m 37th 1000m
2000–01	THE HAGUE 7th 500m 12th 1000m 19th 1500m	HEERENVEEN (silver) 500m 5th 1000m (silver) 500m 4th 1000m (silver) overall		SALT LAKE CITY 11th 500m 5th 500m	INZELL 11th 500m 4th 1000m 9th 500m 5th 1000m 7th overall	19th 500m 14th 1000m
2001–02	HEERENVEEN (bronze) 500m (silver) 1000m 7th 1500m	GRONINGEN (gold) 500m (silver) 1000m (silver) 500m 4th 1000m (gold) overall	SALT LAKE CITY 4th 500m (gold) 1000m		HAMAR 7th 500m (silver) 1000m 5th 500m 5th 1000m 4th overall	5th 500m 9th 1000m
2002–03	UTRECHT (silver) 500m (silver) 1000m 8th 1500m	GRONINGEN (silver) 500m 4th 1000m (silver) 500m DNF 1000m NC overall		BERLIN 4th 500m (silver) 1000m	CALGARY (bronze) 500m 4th 1000m (silver) 500m 4th 1000m (silver) overall	4th 500m (silver) 1000m
2003–04	HEERENVEEN (gold) 500m (silver) 1000m	UTRECHT (gold) 500m (silver) 1000m (silver) 500m (silver) 1000m (silver) overall		SEOUL 8th 500m NF 1000m	NAGANO 7th 500m 6th 1000m (gold) 500m (silver) 1000m 4th overall	27th 100m 7th 500m (silver) 1000m
2004–05	ASSEN (gold) 500m 6th 1000m 14th 1500m	GRONINGEN (gold) 500m 4th 1000m (gold) 500m (bronze) 1000m (gold) overall		INZELL 10th 500m	SALT LAKE CITY (gold) 500m DNS 1000m DNS 500m DNS 1000m NC overall	11th 500m (bronze) 1000m
2005–06	HEERENVEEN 5th 500m 6th 1000m	ASSEN (silver) 500m (silver) 1000m (silver) 500m 5th 1000m (silver) overall			HEERENVEEN 9th 500m 10th 1000m 9th 500m 11th 1000m 6th overall	9th 500m 7th 1000m
2006–07	ASSEN 4th 500m 9th 1000m	GRONINGEN 4th 500m 6th 1000m (silver) 500m 6th 1000m 4th overall			HAMAR 15h 500m 14th 1000m DNS 500m DNS 1000m NC overall	15th 500m
2007–08		HEERENVEEN 8th 500m 13th 1000m 12th 500m 11th 1000m 10th overall				
2008–09		GRONINGEN 5th 500m 4th 1000m 6th 500m 4th 1000m 6th overall				

DQ = Disqualified
DNF = Did not finish
DNS = Did not start
NC = No classification

== Medals won ==
Championship	Gold (gold)	Silver (silver)	Bronze (bronze)
Dutch Single Distances	12	5	3
Dutch Sprint	6	4	1
Olympic Games	1	0	0
World Single Distances	0	1	0
World Sprint	0	1	0

Awards
Preceded by (Netherlands) Gianni Romme	Ard Schenk Award; 2001	Succeeded by (Netherlands) Jochem Uytdehaage (Netherlands) Andrea Nuyt
