= Andrea Nuyt =

Dutch speed skater

Personal information
- Born: 10 July 1974 (age 51) Gouda, the Netherlands
- Height: 1.72 m (5 ft 7 1/2 in)
- Weight: 65 kg (143 lb)

Sport
- Sport: Speed skating
- Club: Schaatsclub Gouda
Medal record
Women's speed skating
World Championships
Silver medal – second place	2002 Hamar	Sprint
Dutch Championships
Gold medal – first place	2000 Utrecht	Sprint
Gold medal – first place	2002 Groningen	Sprint
Silver medal – second place	1999 Groningen	Sprint
Silver medal – second place	2001 Heerenveen	Sprint
Silver medal – second place	2004 Utrecht	Sprint
Bronze medal – third place	1996 Assen	Sprint
Bronze medal – third place	1998 Groningen	Sprint

Andrea Nuyt (born 10 July 1974) is a retired speed skater from the Netherlands who won a silver medal at the World Sprint Speed Skating Championships for Women in 2002. She also competed at the 1998 and 2002 Winter Olympics in the 500 m and 1000 m. Her best achievement was fourth place in the 500 m in 2002.

Nuyt has two daughters, Lisan and Manouk, with her partner Carl Verheijen, who is also an Olympic speed skater.

== Personal records ==
Personal records
Women's Speed skating
Event	Result	Date	Location	Notes
500m	37.54	13 February 2002	Salt Lake City	
1000m	1:14.65	17 February 2002	Salt Lake City	
1500m	2:00.38	20 March 1999	Calgary	
3000m	4:29.14	16 August 1998	Calgary	
5000m	7:59.17	9 March 1995	Heerenveen	

== Tournament overview ==
Season	Dutch Championships Single Distances	Dutch Championships Sprint	Olympic Games	World Championships Sprint	World Championships Single Distances	World Championships Allround Junior
1993–94						BERLIN 16th 500m 14th 1500m 11th 1000m DNQ 3000m NC overall
1995–96	GRONINGEN (bronze) 500m	ASSEN (bronze) 500m (silver) 1000m (silver) 500m 5th 1000m (bronze) overall				
1996–97	THE HAGUE (bronze) 500m (bronze) 1000m					
1997–98	HEERENVEEN (gold) 500m	GRONINGEN (silver) 500m 4th 1000m (silver) 500m 6th 1000m (bronze) overall	NAGANO 37th 500m [fell]	BERLIN 16th 500m 18th 1000m 19th 500m 24th 1000m 19th overall		
1998–99	GRONINGEN (gold) 500m	GRONINGEN (gold) 500m 6th 1000m (silver) 500m 5th 1000m (silver) overall		CALGARY 11th 500m 9th 1000m 6th 500m 11th 1000m 9th overall		
1999–2000	DEVENTER (gold) 500m (silver) 1000m	UTRECHT (gold) 500m (gold) 1000m (gold) 500m (gold) 1000m (gold) overall		SEOUL 27th 500m 9th 1000m 8th 500m 8th 1000m 27th overall	NAGANO 9th 500m 4th 1000m	
2000–01	THE HAGUE (gold) 500m (gold) 1000m	HEERENVEEN (gold) 500m (silver) 1000m (gold) 500m (silver) 1000m (silver) overall		INZELL 6th 500m 7th 1000m 7th 500m 16th 1000m 8th overall	SALT LAKE CITY 5th 500m	
2001–02	GRONINGEN (gold) 500m (bronze) 1000m	GRONINGEN (gold) 500m (silver) 1000m (gold) 500m (silver) 1000m (gold) overall	SALT LAKE CITY 4th 500m 8th 1000m	HAMAR 4th 500m (silver) 1000m (silver) 500m (bronze) 1000m (silver) overall		
2002–03	UTRECHT (silver) 500m			CALGARY 6th 500m 11th 1000m 7th 500m 12th 1000m 10th overall		
2003–04	HEERENVEEN (silver) 500m (bronze) 1000m	UTRECHT (silver) 500m 4th1000m (silver) 500m 4th 1000m (silver) overall		NAGANO 14th 500m 12th 1000m 12th 500m 6th 1000m 11th overall	SEOUL 8th 500m	
