= Annette Gerritsen =

Dutch speed skater (born 1985)

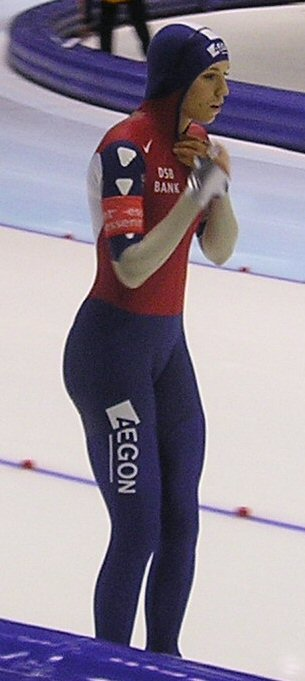
- Gerritsen prepares for a race in 2006

Personal information
- Full name: Annette Albertine Gerritsen
- Born: 11 October 1985 (age 40) Ilpendam, Netherlands
- Height: 171 cm (5 ft 7 in)
- Weight: 61 kg (134 lb)

Sport
- Country: Netherlands
- Sport: Speed skating
- Turned pro: 2005
Medal record
Women's speed skating
Representing the Netherlands
Olympic Games
Silver medal – second place	2010 Vancouver	1000 m
World Sprint Championships
Bronze medal – third place	2008 Heerenveen	Sprint
Silver medal – second place	2011 Heerenveen	Sprint
World Single Distance Championships
Bronze medal – third place	2008 Nagano	500 m
Bronze medal – third place	2008 Nagano	1000 m

Annette Albertine Gerritsen (born 11 October 1985) is a Dutch former speed skater. She specialised in the 500 m and 1000 m distances, and won a silver medal in the 1000 metres at the 2010 Winter Olympics in Vancouver. She is the current Dutch junior record holder in the 500 m (38.57) and her personal best (1.16.14) used to be the world junior record. She also holds the world junior record with her Dutch teammates in the team pursuit (3.12.37).

== Skating career ==
Gerritsen's breakthrough came during the 2004–05 speed skating season when she won the bronze medal in the 500 m at the 2005 KNSB Dutch Single Distance Championships. She won another bronze medal that same year at the 2005 KNSB Dutch Sprint Championships and qualified for the 2005 ISU World Sprint Championships where she finished in the 17th position.

=== 2005–06 season ===
The year after, at the 2006 KNSB Dutch Single Distance Championships she improved her bronze 500 m medal to a silver and was also able to win a bronze medal in the 1000 m. She then successfully defended her bronze medal at the 2006 KNSB Dutch Sprint Championships and also managed to qualify for both the 2006 ISU World Sprint Championships and the 2006 Winter Olympics. While her Sprint Championships were successful when she finished in the 6th position her Olympics were disappointing. Gerritsen qualified in two distances. She finished the12th in the 500 m and 23rd in the 1000 m.

=== 2006–07 season ===
In the 2006–07 pre-season Gerritsen showed her potential to become the fastest Dutch sprint speed skater while beating teammate Marianne Timmer several times. However at the 2007 KNSB Dutch Single Distance Championships she was unable to keep her pre-season form and only finished in the third position behind the surprising Margot Boer and Timmer. Her performances allowed her to participate in the 2007 World Sprint Championships, where she finished 7th overall, with a 4th place in the second 1000 m race. On 28 January, Gerritsen won her first World Cup event, a 500 m in Heerenveen, although only after the favorite Jenny Wolf fell after 50 m. Her victory guaranteed her a spot in the 500 m at the 2007 World Single Distance Championship, to be held in Salt Lake City on 10 March.

Gerritsen used to date multiple Olympic speed skating medallist Sven Kramer.

=== 2010 Olympics ===
Gerritsen won silver in the 1000 m at the 2010 Winter Olympics in Vancouver with a time of 1.16.58, only a fiftieth of a second behind gold medallist Christine Nesbitt of Canada.

== Personal bests ==
Personal records
Speed skating
Event	Result	Date	Location	Notes
500 m	37.63	17 November 2007	Olympic Oval, Calgary	
1000 m	1.14.33	29 January 2012	Olympic Oval, Calgary	
1500 m	1.55.91	17 November 2007	Olympic Oval, Calgary	
3000 m	4.14.08	11 March 2005	Olympic Oval, Calgary	
