= Thialf =

Ice rink in Heerenveen, the Netherlands

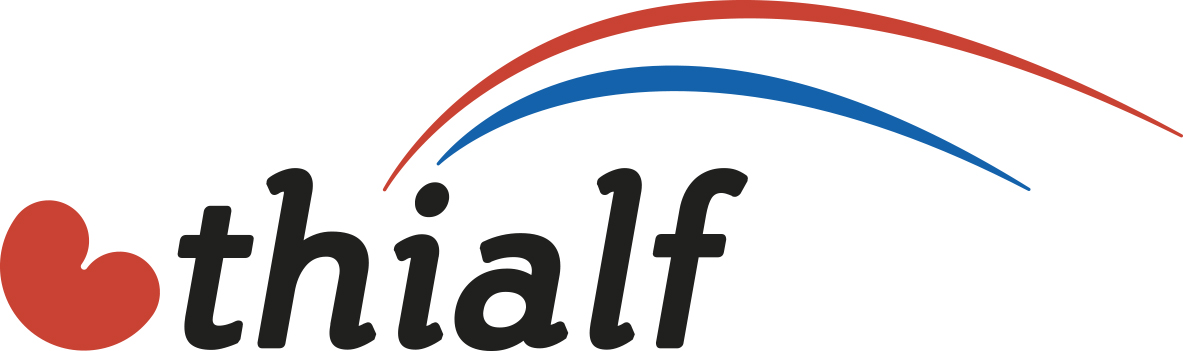

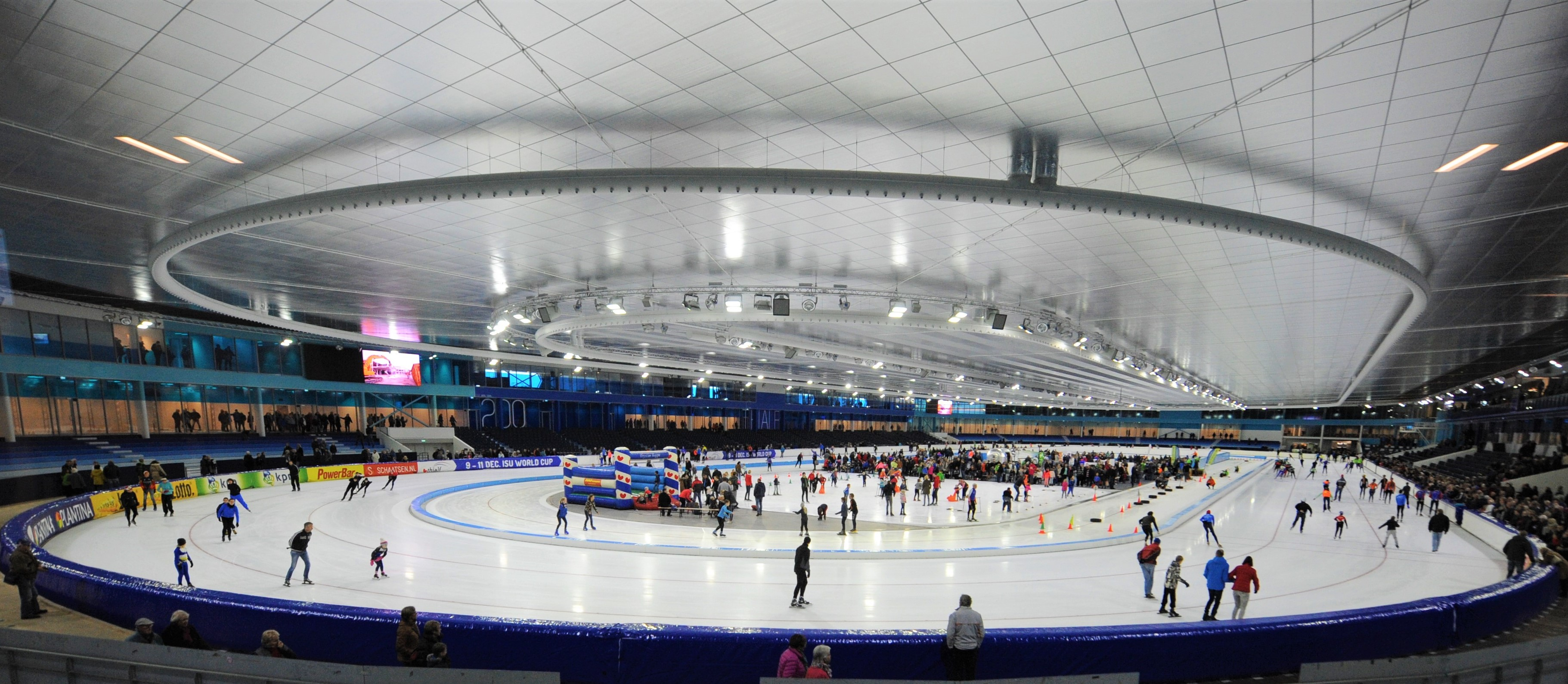
- Interactive map of Thialf
- Location: Pim Mulierlaan 1 Heerenveen, Netherlands
- Coordinates: 52.9386°N 5.94201°E
- Owner: Essent, Aegon, and the city of Heerenveen
- Capacity: 12,500 seats
- Surface: 15,000 m^{2} (Hal 1); 1800 m^{2} (Hal 2)

Construction
- Groundbreaking: 1966
- Opened: 14 October 1967 (outdoor); 17 November 1986 (indoor)
- Renovated: 2001, 2004, 2015–16
- Architect: Alynia Architecten Harlingen bv

Tenant
- UNIS Flyers (Ice hockey venue)

Thialf (Dutch pronunciation: [ˈtijɑlf]) is an ice arena in Heerenveen, Netherlands. Thialf is used for long track speed skating, short track speed skating, ice hockey, figure skating, ice speedway, and non-sporting events. The outdoor rink was opened in 1967, and the indoor stadium was opened in 1986. Several world records have been set in the indoor stadium.

Annually, Thialf hosts two Speed Skating World Cup events. Jan de Jong was the ice rink master at Thialf for many years. Thialf will host the speed skating competition during the 2030 Winter Olympics.

== History ==
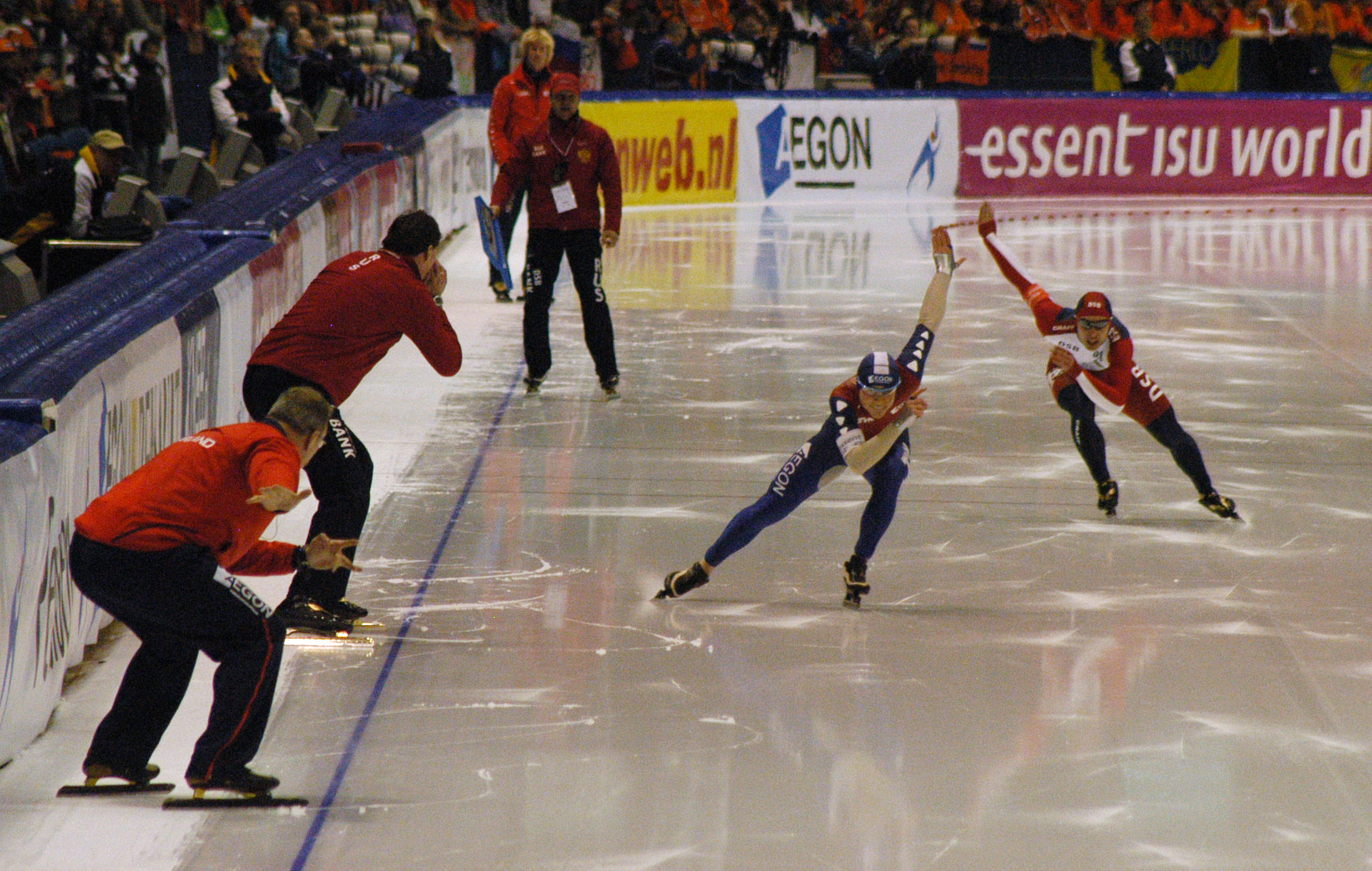
Ice skaters and their coaches during the World Cup in the season 2007–2008

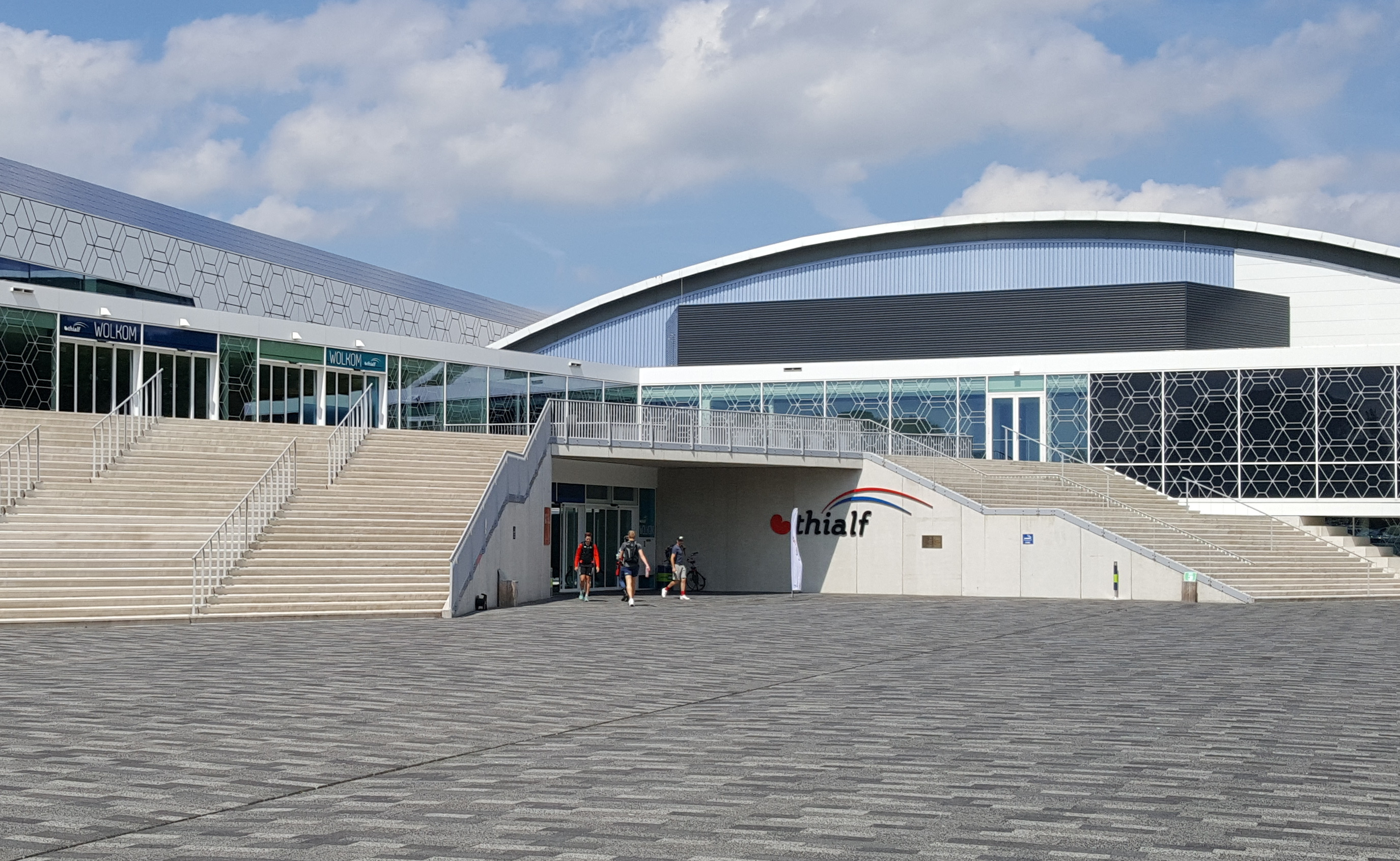
Main entrance after renovation

Thialf is named after Thialfi, a character in Norse mythology, who was Thor's servant and had to race a giant.

Construction on the artificial outdoor ice rink was started in 1966, and it was opened on 14 October 1967 by Princess Christina of the Netherlands. It was the third 400m artificial ice rink in the Netherlands, after the Jaap Eden baan in Amsterdam and the IJsselstadion in Deventer. Several national and international tournaments have been held in Thialf, but only one world record has been set on the outdoor rink, by Andrea Schöne on the 5000 m in 1983.

The roofed stadium, which seats 12,500 people, opened on 17 November 1986, about a year after Sportforum Hohenschönhausen in Berlin, which was the first 400m indoor speed skating oval in the world. Thanks to the indoor conditions, allowing climate control, almost all world speed skating records were broken at Thialf in the first season. Since 1988 it has been overtaken as the "fastest ice in the world" by the high-altitude indoor rinks in Calgary and Salt Lake City, which have the additional benefit of low air pressure.

Every year there are main skating events like the Dutch, European and World championships, and one or two Speed Skating World Cup events in Thialf.

The 2500-seat ice hockey arena adjacent to the speed skating oval is the home arena of the Heerenveen Flyers, one of the Netherlands' most successful ice hockey clubs. It is also the main arena used in the Netherlands for international ice hockey tournaments, hosting the IIHF World U18 Championships (Division II, Group A) in late March 2012.

The stadium was renovated in 2016.

=== 2030 Winter Olympics ===
In April 2025, the organizing committee for the 2030 Winter Olympics in the French Alps started to consider having long track speed skating in Thialf. The organizing committee determined that it was not economical to develop a new or temporary speed skating venue in France for the games and instead looked for an existing venue elsewhere. In June 2026, Thialf was confirmed as the speed skating venue, making the 2026 games the first Winter Olympics (and the fourth overall, after 1920, 1956, and 2008) to have events that would be hosted outside of the host country. It will be the first Olympic events held in The Netherlands in 102 years, following the 1928 Summer Olympics in Amsterdam.

== Long track speed skating ==
=== Events ===
Dutch championships

| Discipline | in: |
|---|---|
| Allround | 1968*, 1969, 1973, 1979, 1982, 2001, 2005, 2007, 2008, 2009, 2010, 2011, 2012, 2013 |
| Sprint | 1969*, 1973*, 1979*, 1982*, 1989, 1992, 2001, 2008, 2011, 2012 |
| Single Distance | 1988, 1989, 1990, 1992, 1994, 1998, 2004, 2006, 2009, 2009, 2010, 2011, 2012, 2013 |

* Dutch allround 1968: only for women.
* Dutch sprint: 1969, 1973, 1979, 1982: only for men.

European championships

| Discipline | in: |
|---|---|
| Allround | Men: 1971, 1975; Women: 1970, 1981, 1982, 1983; M+W: 1990, 1992, 1993, 1995, 1996, 1997, 1999, 2003, 2004, 2005, 2009, 2013, 2017, 2021, 2025 |
| Sprint | 2017, 2021, 2025 |
| Single Distance | 2020, 2022, 2024 |

World championships

| Discipline | in: |
|---|---|
| Allround | Men: 1976, 1977, 1980, 1987, 1991; Women: 1972, 1974, 1992; M+W: 1998, 2002, 2007, 2010, 2014, 2026 |
| Sprint | 1985, 1989, 1996, 2006, 2008, 2011, 2026 |
| Single Distance | 1999, 2012, 2015, 2021, 2023 |

World Cup

| Discipline | in: |
|---|---|
| World Cup | 2006–07: WC1 + WC6; 2007–08: WC4 + WC9; 2008–09: WC2 + WC8; 2009–10: WC2 + WC7; 2010–11: WC1 + WC8 (final); 2011–12: WC3 + WC6; 2012–13: WC1 + WC9 (final); 2013–14: WC6 (final); 2014–15: WC4 + WC6; 2015–16: WC4 + WC6 (final) |

=== Track records ===
These are the current track records in Thialf.

Men
| Distance | Time | Skater | Date | Duration |
|---|---|---|---|---|
| 500 m | 33.78 | (Netherlands) Jenning de Boo | 5 March 2026 | 179 days |
| 1000 m | 1:06.38 | (United States) Jordan Stolz | 6 December 2025 | 268 days |
| 1500 m | 1:42.55 | (United States) Jordan Stolz | 5 December 2025 | 269 days |
| 3000 m | 3:34.09 | (Czech Republic) Metoděj Jílek | 16 September 2025 | 349 days |
| 5000 m | 6:01.61 | (Norway) Sander Eitrem | 7 March 2026 | 177 days |
| 10000 m | 12:29.63 | (Czech Republic) Metoděj Jílek | 6 December 2025 | 268 days |
| Team sprint | 1:18.31 | Poland | 6 January 2024 | 968 days |
| Team pursuit | 3:34.22 | Norway | 5 January 2024 | 969 days |

Women
| Distance | Time | Skater | Date | Duration |
|---|---|---|---|---|
| 500 m | 36.67 | (Netherlands) Femke Kok | 5 March 2026 | 179 days |
| 1000 m | 1:12.80 | (Netherlands) Jutta Leerdam | 28 December 2022 | 1342 days |
| 1500 m | 1:52.69 | (Netherlands) Femke Kok | 4 October 2025 | 331 days |
| 3000 m | 3:54.04 | (Netherlands) Irene Schouten | 20 November 2022 | 1380 days |
| 5000 m | 6:41.25 | (Netherlands) Irene Schouten | 5 March 2023 | 1275 days |
| 10000 m | 14:35.61 | (Netherlands) Carien Kleibeuker | 13 March 2018 | 3093 days |
| Team sprint | 1:26.17 | Russia | 10 January 2020 | 2425 days |
| Team pursuit | 2:54.12 | Netherlands | 9 January 2022 | 1695 days |

=== World records ===
The following world records were set in Thialf.

Men
| Distance | Time | Skater | Dates | |
| Distance | Time | Skater | Set | Broken |
|---|---|---|---|---|
| 500 m | 36.55 | (United States) Nick Thometz | 19–03–1987 | 14–02–1988 |
| 1000 m | 1:12.58 | (Soviet Union) Igor Zhelezovski | 25–02–1989 | 17–12–1993 |
| 1500 m | 1:52.70 | (Soviet Union) Nikolay Gulyayev | 15–02–1987 | 05–12–1987 |
| 1500 m | 1:48.88 | (Netherlands) Rintje Ritsma | 20–12–1997 | 12–02–1998 |
| 3000 m | 3:59.27 | (Netherlands) Leo Visser | 19–03–1987 | 13–03–1990 |
| 3000 m | 3:57.52 | (Norway) Johann Olav Koss | 13–03–1990 | 03–04–1992 |
| 3000 m | 3:52.67 | (Netherlands) Jelmer Beulenkamp | 25–02–1998 | 21–03–1998 |
| 5000 m | 6:47.01 | (Netherlands) Leo Visser | 14–02–1987 | 22–11–1987 |
| 5000 m | 6:45.44 | (Norway) Geir Karlstad | 22–11–1987 | 04–12–1987 |
| 5000 m | 6:41.73 | (Norway) Johann Olav Koss | 09–02–1991 | 22–01–1993 |
| 5000 m | 6:38.77 | (Norway) Johann Olav Koss | 22–01–1993 | 13–03–1993 |
| 5000 m | 6:36.57 | (Norway) Johann Olav Koss | 13–03–1993 | 04–12–1993 |
| 5000 m | 6:30.63 | (Netherlands) Gianni Romme | 07–12–1997 | 08–02–1998 |
| 10000 m | 14:03.92 | (Norway) Geir Karlstad | 15–02–1987 | 06–12–1987 |
| 10000 m | 13:43.54 | (Norway) Johann Olav Koss | 10–02–1991 | 20–02–1994 |
| 10000 m | 13:03.40 | (Netherlands) Gianni Romme | 26–11–2000 | 20–02–2002 |
| 10000 m | 12:57.92 | (Netherlands) Carl Verheijen | 04–12–2005 | 31–12–2005 |
| 10000 m | 12:49.88 | (Netherlands) Sven Kramer | 11–02–2007 | 10–03–2007 |
| 10000 m | 12:32.95 | (Sweden) Nils van der Poel | 14–02–2021 | 11–02–2022 |

Women
| Distance | Time | Skater | Dates | |
| Distance | Time | Skater | Set | Broken |
|---|---|---|---|---|
| 500 m | 39.43 | (United States) Bonnie Blair | 19–03–1987 | 06–12–1987 |
| 3000 m | 4:16.85 | (Netherlands) Yvonne van Gennip | 19–03–1987 | 05–12–1987 |
| 3000 m | 4:07.80 | (Germany) Gunda Niemann-Stirnemann | 07–12–1997 | 13–12–1997 |
| 3000 m | 4:05.08 | (Germany) Gunda Niemann-Stirnemann | 14–03–1998 | 27–03–1998 |
| 5000 m | 7:40.97 | (East Germany) Andrea Schöne | 23–01–1983 | 15–01–1984 |
| 5000 m | 7:20.36 | (Netherlands) Yvonne van Gennip | 20–03–1987 | 28–02–1988 |
| 5000 m | 6:55.34 | (Germany) Gunda Niemann-Stirnemann | 25–11–2000 | 10–03–2001 |

== Other events ==
The arena has hosted concerts by many famous artists, including Whitney Houston, Tina Turner, André Rieu, TOTO, Trance Energy and Prince, among others.

Also, the Miss Universe competition was held in Thialf several times.

== See also ==
- List of indoor arenas in the Netherlands
- List of indoor speed skating rinks
