= Beorn Nijenhuis =

Dutch speed skater (born 1984)

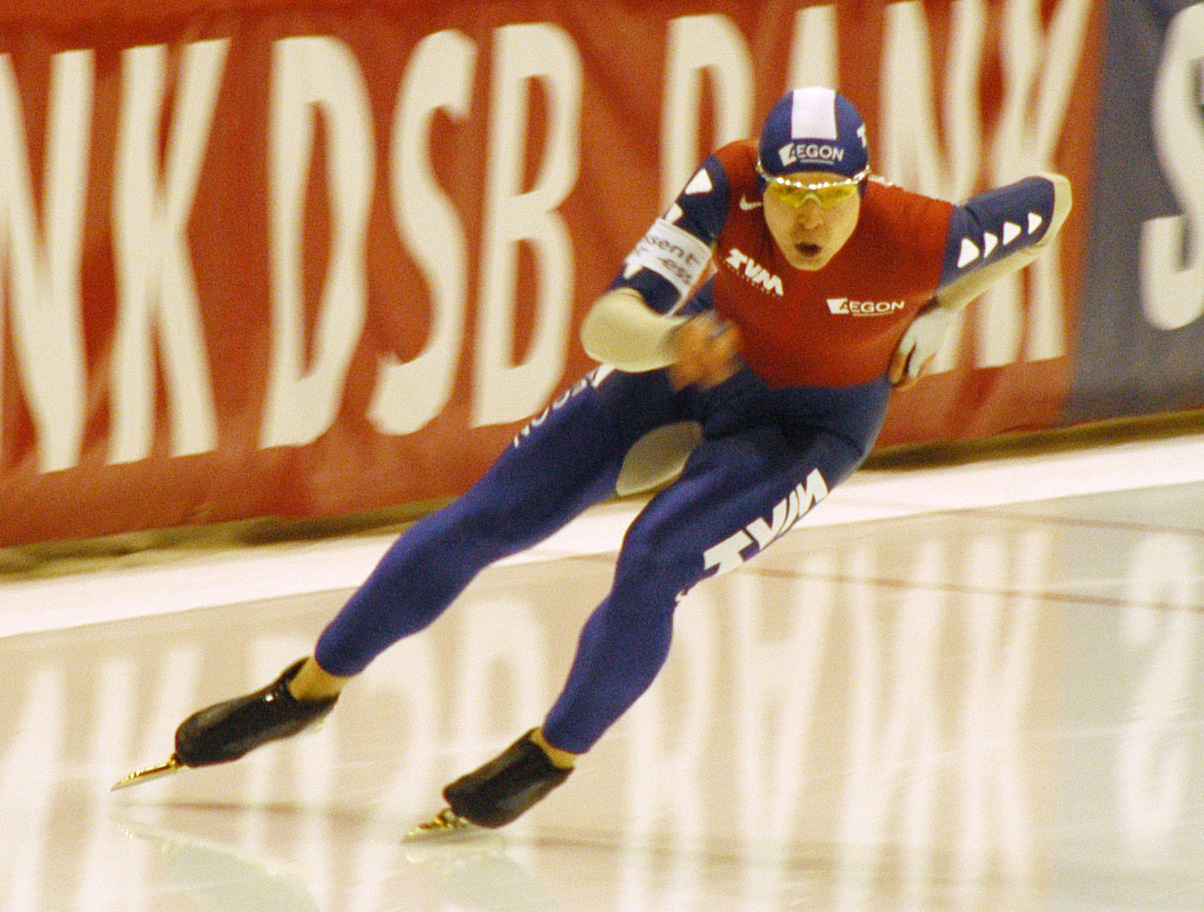
- Nijenhuis in 2008

Personal information
- Born: 2 April 1984 (age 42) Rocky Mountain House, Alberta, Canada

Sport
- Country: Netherlands
- Sport: Speed skating

Achievements and titles
- Personal best: 2006 Winter Olympics

Beorn Nijenhuis (born 2 April 1984) is a Dutch speed skater, who represented the Netherlands at the 2006 Winter Olympics.

Born in Canada, where he started speed skating, he eventually moved to the Netherlands at the age of 13. A year later he received his Dutch citizenship, and started competing for them soon after.

He has been a standout in the men's 1000m on the international scene, ranking second in the Speed Skating World Cup standings and finishing fifth at the 2005 World Single Distance Championships. He was third in the final 1500m World Cup rankings. He was national record holder in the 1000 meter from 2008 to 2012.

The Torino Olympics was his first appearance at the Olympics. He finished 35th in the 500 metres and 12th in the 1000 meters.

== Personal records ==
Personal records
speed skating
Event	Result	Date	Location	Notes
500 meter	35.00	20 November 2005	Salt Lake City	
1000 meter	1:07.07	16 March 2008	Calgary	
1500 meter	1:43.66	13 March 2008	Calgary	
3000 meter	3:50.24	24 March 2002	Calgary	
5000 meter	6:45.54	22 March 2002	Calgary	
10000 meter	15:05.37	27 November 2002	Groningen	

Nijenhuis has an Adelskalender score of 155.350 points

== World records established ==
Event	Result	Date	Location	Notes
1500 meter	1:46.80	21 March 2002	Calgary	Junior world record until 21 March 2003
1000 meter	1:10.65	23 March 2002	Calgary	Junior world record until 11 January 2003
1000 meter	1:08.83	11 January 2003	Salt Lake City	Junior world record until 19 January 2003
Sprint combination	140.315	12 January 2003	Calgary	Junior world record until 19 January 2003
1000 meter	1:08.53	19 January 2003	Calgary	Junior world record until 2 December 2017
Sprint combination	139.750	19 January 2003	Calgary	Junior world record

== Tournament overview ==
Season	Dutch Championships Single Distances	Dutch Championships Sprint	World Championships Sprint	World Championships Single Distances	Olympic Games	World Cup	World Championships Junior Allround
2000–01	THE HAGUE 21st 1000m						
2001–02							COLLALBO 5th 500m 7th 3000m 4th 1500m 4th 5000m (gold) overall (bronze) Team pursuit
2002–03	UTRECHT 6th 500m 10th 1000m 13th 1500m	GRONINGEN 4th 500m (bronze) 1000m 4th 500m (silver) 1000m (bronze) overall	CALGARY 10th 500m 9th 1000m 15th 500m 5th 1000m 11th overall			42nd 500m 13th 1000m 25th 1500m	
2003–04	HEERENVEEN 4th 500m 4th 1000m 6th 1500m	UTRECHT 5th 500m 4th 1000m 5th 500m (bronze) 1000m (bronze) overall	NAGANO 13th 500m (silver) 1000m 13th 500m 12th 1000m 11th overall			21st 100m 15th 500m (bronze) 1000m	
2004–05	ASSEN (silver) 500m (gold) 1000m (gold) 1500m	GRONINGEN (silver) 500m (gold) 1000m DNF 500m (silver) 1000m 22nd overall		INZELL 12th 500m 5th 1000m		15th 500m (silver) 1000m (bronze) 1500m	
2005–06	HEERENVEEN (silver) 500m (bronze) 1000m 5th 1500m	ASSEN (gold) 500m (bronze) 1000m 7th 500m (gold) 1000m (bronze) overall	HEERENVEEN 17th 500m 9th 1000m 16th 500m 12th 1000m 9th overall		TURIN 35th 500m 12th 1000m	35th 500m 19th 1000m 5th 1500m	
2006–07	ASSEN DNF 500m (bronze) 1000m 7th 1500m	GRONINGEN (silver) 500m 4th 1000m 4th 500m (bronze) 1000m (bronze) overall	HAMAR 7th 500m 5th 1000m 6th 500m 5th 1000m 5th overall	SALT LAKE CITY 8th 1000m		33rd 100m 37th 500m 6th 1000m 15th 1500m	
2007–08		HEERENVEEN 5th 500m 6th 1000m 8th 500m 6th 1000m 6th overall				23rd 1500m	
2008–09	HEERENVEEN 4th 500m DQ 1000m 7th 1500m	GRONINGEN 9th 500m 7th 1000m 5th 500m 6th 1000m 6th overall				35th 100m 24th 500m	
2009–10	HEERENVEEN 13th 500m 5th 1000m	GRONINGEN 5th 500m (silver) 1000m 9th 500m (bronze) 1000m (bronze) overall	№OBIHIRO 10th 500m (silver) 1000m 13th 500m 5th 1000m 7th overall			29th 1000m	

- DNF = Did not finish
- DQ = Disqualified

== Medals won ==
Championship	Gold (gold)	Silver (silver)	Bronze (bronze)
Dutch Single Distances	2	2	2
Dutch Sprint	0	0	5
