= Marianne Timmer =

Dutch speed skater (born 1974)

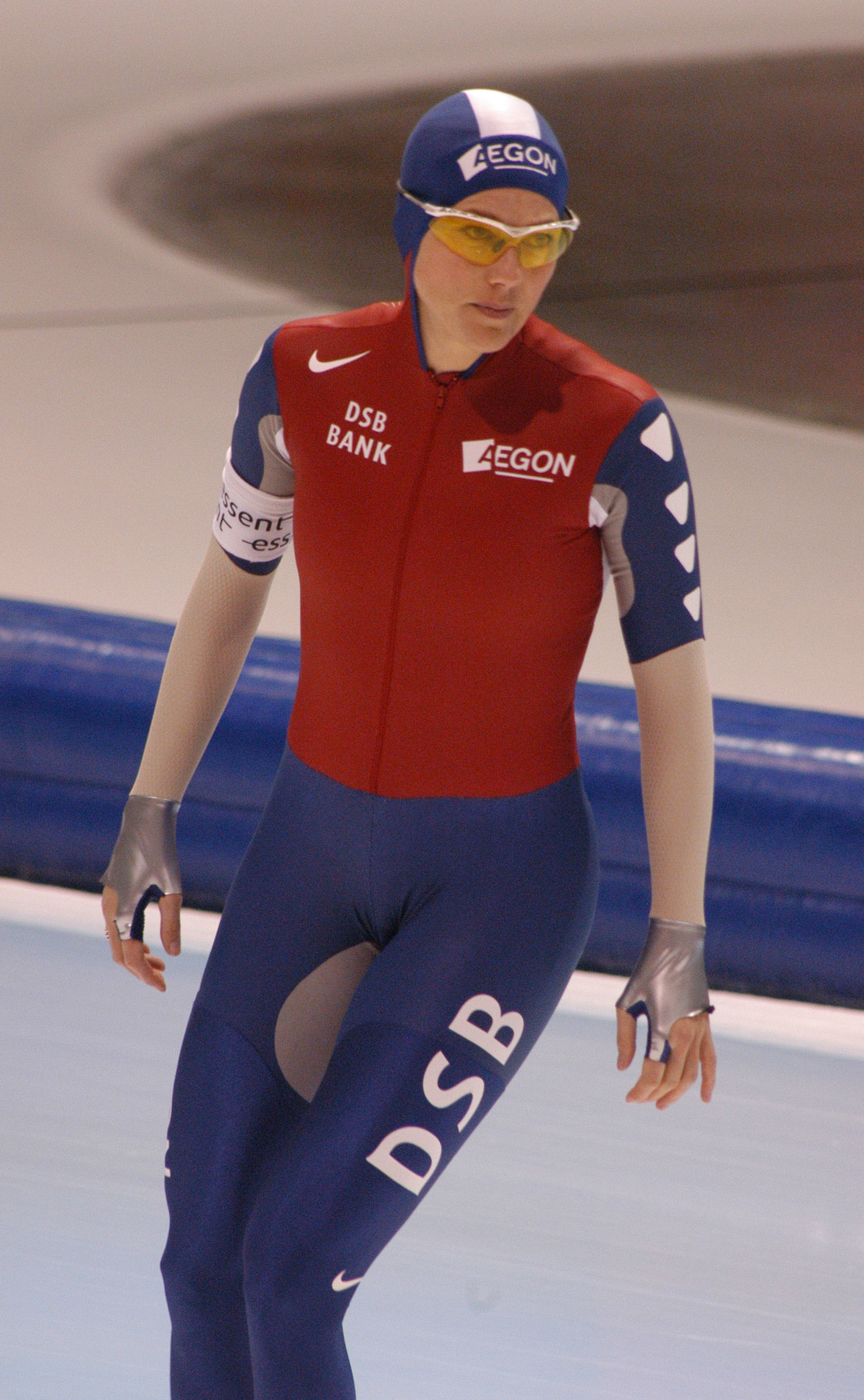
- Marianne Timmer

Personal information
- Born: 3 October 1974 (age 52) Sappemeer, Netherlands
- Height: 1.74 m (5 ft 9 in)
- Weight: 63 kg (139 lb)
- Spouses: Peter Mueller (divorced); Henk Timmer (separated)

Sport
- Country: Netherlands
- Sport: Speed skating
Medal record
Women's speed skating
Representing the Netherlands
Olympic Games
Gold medal – first place	1998 Nagano	1000 m
Gold medal – first place	1998 Nagano	1500 m
Gold medal – first place	2006 Turin	1000 m
World Championships
Gold medal – first place	1997 Warsaw	1000 m
Gold medal – first place	1999 Heerenveen	1000 m
Gold medal – first place	2004 Seoul	Sprint
Silver medal – second place	2000 Nagano	1000 m
Silver medal – second place	2004 Seoul	1000 m
Bronze medal – third place	2000 Nagano	Sprint
Bronze medal – third place	1997 Warsaw	1500 m
Bronze medal – third place	1999 Heerenveen	500 m
Bronze medal – third place	2005 Inzell	1000 m

Maria Aaltje "Marianne" Timmer (born 3 October 1974) is a Dutch former speed skater specializing in the middle distances (1000 and 1500 m). At the 1998 Winter Olympics she won a gold medal in both these events.

== Speed skating career ==
In 1999 she won the 1000 m in the World Single Distance Championships and in 2004 became world champion in the sprint. In 2006, she won the 1000 m at the 2006 Winter Olympics in Turin. This made her the first skater from the Netherlands to win a gold medal at two different Winter Games.

Timmer broke through at the Junior World Championship in 1994, winning bronze. She began to specialize in the shorter distances.

=== Nagano 1998 ===
Timmer won gold in the 1000 and 1500 meter races during the 1998 Winter Olympics in Nagano, beating Chris Witty in the 1000m and Gunda Niemann in the 1500m.

=== Salt Lake City 2002 ===
At the 2002 Winter Olympics in Salt Lake City, Timmer finished 8th in the 500m, fourth in the 1000m, and 21st in the 1500m.

=== World Sprint Speed Skating Championships, Nagano 2004 ===
On 18 January 2004, Timmer became the first Dutch woman to win a World Sprint Speed Skating Championship. Though she did not win any individual distances (she got three third and one fourth place), she was the most consistent athlete and won the overall championship.

=== Turin 2006 ===
At the Dutch championships, Timmer qualified for the 500m and 1000m events at the 2006 Winter Olympics. She was disqualified after a false start in the 500m race, but a week later she surprisingly won gold in the 1000m, beating out favorites Cindy Klassen and Anni Friesinger by a very slim margin. This result qualified her for the 1500m, where she finished 14th.

=== 2008–09 season ===
In January 2008, Timmer announced she wished to extend her contract with sponsor DSB Bank, until the 2010 Winter Olympics in Vancouver, and at the end of February 2008 the contract was signed.

=== 2009–10 season ===
On 13 November 2009, Timmer broke her heel on the 500m, during a World Cup event in Thialf. She failed to qualify for the Winter Games in Vancouver.

=== 2010–11 season ===
At the 2011 Dutch Single Distance Championships in Thialf, Timmer got the third-fastest time on the first 500m, but ran into Marrit Leenstra on the second 500m, and fell. The next day, on the 1000m, she did not get farther than tenth place. Because of her first 500m result, she did qualify for the 2010–11 ISU Speed Skating World Cup.

She published a biography in 2010, written by De Telegraaf journalist Frank Woestenburg.

She withdrew from the Dutch Sprint Championship on 27 December 2010 after a disappointing 500m on the first day. In May 2010 Timmer, Annette Gerritsen, and Margot Boer left the Control team to start their own team, sponsored by Liga, a company manufacturing biscuits and crackers. She stopped skating on 28 December 2010, though she said she would remain involved with Team Liga. Her official goodbye took place during the Tijdens het 2011 World Sprint Speed Skating Championships in Heerenveen, on 22 January 2011. On that occasion she was named an honorary member of the KNSB.

== Records ==
=== Personal records ===
Personal records
Speed skating
Event	Result	Date	Location	Notes
500 m	37.86	17 November 2007	Olympic Oval, Calgary	
1000 m	1:14.45	17 February 2002	Utah Olympic Oval, Salt Lake City	
1500 m	1:57.58	16 February 1998	M-Wave, Nagano	World record until beaten by Anni Friesinger on 29 March 1998.
3000 m	4:15.76	21 October 2001	Olympic Oval, Calgary	
5000 m	7:53.32	17 March 1994	Thialf, Heerenveen	

=== World records ===
Distance	Time	Date	Location
1500 m	1:57.58	16 February 1998	M-Wave, Nagano
Small allround	163.315	16 March 1997	Olympic Oval, Calgary

== Tournament summary ==
Year	Dutch Distance	Dutch Allround	Dutch Sprint	Olympics	World Cup	World Distance	World Sprint	World Juniors
1993							27th	
1994	(silver) 1000 m 10th 1500 m 11th 3000 m				26th 500 m 26th 1000 m 39th 1500 m		23rd	3rd place, bronze medalist(s)
1995	14th 1500 m		NS4		27th 500 m 41st 1000 m 28th 1500 m			
1996	(silver) 500 m (bronze) 1000 m (silver) 1500 m 4th 3000 m 8th 5000 m	6th	6th		52nd 1000 m 44th 1500 m 32nd 3k/5k			
1997			1st place, gold medalist(s)		8th 500 m 4th 1000 m 6th 1500 m	4th 500 m (gold) 1000 m (bronze) 1500 m	6th	
1998	(silver) 500 m (gold) 1000 m (silver) 1500 m		1st place, gold medalist(s)	6th 500 m (gold) 1000 m (gold) 1500 m	16th 500 m 7th 1000 m 9th 1500 m	14th 500 m 8th 1000 m NF 1500 m	8th	
1999	(silver) 500 m (gold) 1000 m 4th 1500 m 7th 3000 m		1st place, gold medalist(s)		10th 500 m 7th 1000 m 10th 1500 m	(bronze) 500 m (gold) 1000 m	4th	
2000	(silver) 500 m (gold) 1000 m 8th 1500 m	7th	2nd place, silver medalist(s)		11th 500 m 8th 1000 m 18th 1500 m 30th 3k/5k	10th 500 m (silver) 1000 m	3rd place, bronze medalist(s)	
2001	(silver) 500 m (bronze) 1000 m 7th 1500 m		1st place, gold medalist(s)		20th 500 m 11th 1000 m 29th 1500 m	9th 500 m 8th 1000 m	6th	
2002	(silver) 500 m (gold) 1000 m (silver) 1500 m			8th 500 m 4th 1000 m 21st 1500 m	17th 500 m 9th 1000 m 14th 1500 m		10th	
2003	(gold) 500 m (gold) 1000 m 15th 1500 m		1st place, gold medalist(s)		10th 500 m 4th 1000 m 20th 1500 m	9th 500 m 4th 1000 m	8th	
2004	(gold) 500 m (gold) 1000 m (bronze) 1500 m		1st place, gold medalist(s)		(silver) 500 m (silver) 1000 m 6th 1500 m	5th 500 m (silver) 1000 m 9th 1500 m	1st place, gold medalist(s)	
2005	(gold) 500 m (gold) 1000 m (silver) 1500 m		1st place, gold medalist(s)		7th 500 m (silver) 1000 m 15th 1500 m	10th 500 m (bronze) 1000 m	11th	
2006	(gold) 500 m (silver) 1000 m 14th 1500 m		1st place, gold medalist(s)	DQ 500 m (gold) 1000 m 14th 1500 m	13th 500 m 6th 1000 m		4th	
2007	(silver) 500 m (bronze) 1000 m		1st place, gold medalist(s)		16th 100 m 14th 500 m 4th 1000 m		NS3	
2008	(bronze) 500 m 6th 1000 m		1st place, gold medalist(s)		15th 100 m 6th 500 m 8th 1000 m	6th 500 m	5th	
2009	4th 500 m 9th 1000 m				24th 100 m 15th 500 m 27th 1000 m	11th 500 m		
2010	(bronze) 500 m (bronze) 1000 m				31st 500 m 24th 1000 m			
2011	fell 500 m 10th 1000 m		NS2					

== Personal life ==
Timmer was born in Sappemeer. She was previously married to her former coach Peter Mueller. They were married in Las Vegas in 2001, after which he added her to Spaar Select, his skating team, against the wishes of the other skaters, in what a reviewer of his autobiography called a "dominating and intimidating" way. Timmer and Mueller broke up in 2003, and Mueller avenged himself on Timmer in his autobiography. She was married to ex-goalkeeper Henk Timmer. After a fifteen-year relationship and seven years of marriage, the couple split up in 2019.

Awards
Preceded by Tonny de Jong	Dutch Sportswoman of the Year; 1998	Succeeded by Leontien van Moorsel
Preceded by Ids Postma; Gretha Smit; Renate Groenewold	Ard Schenk Award; 1998; 2004; 2006	Succeeded by Rintje Ritsma; Renate Groenewold; Ireen Wüst
