= Gretha Smit =

Dutch speed skater

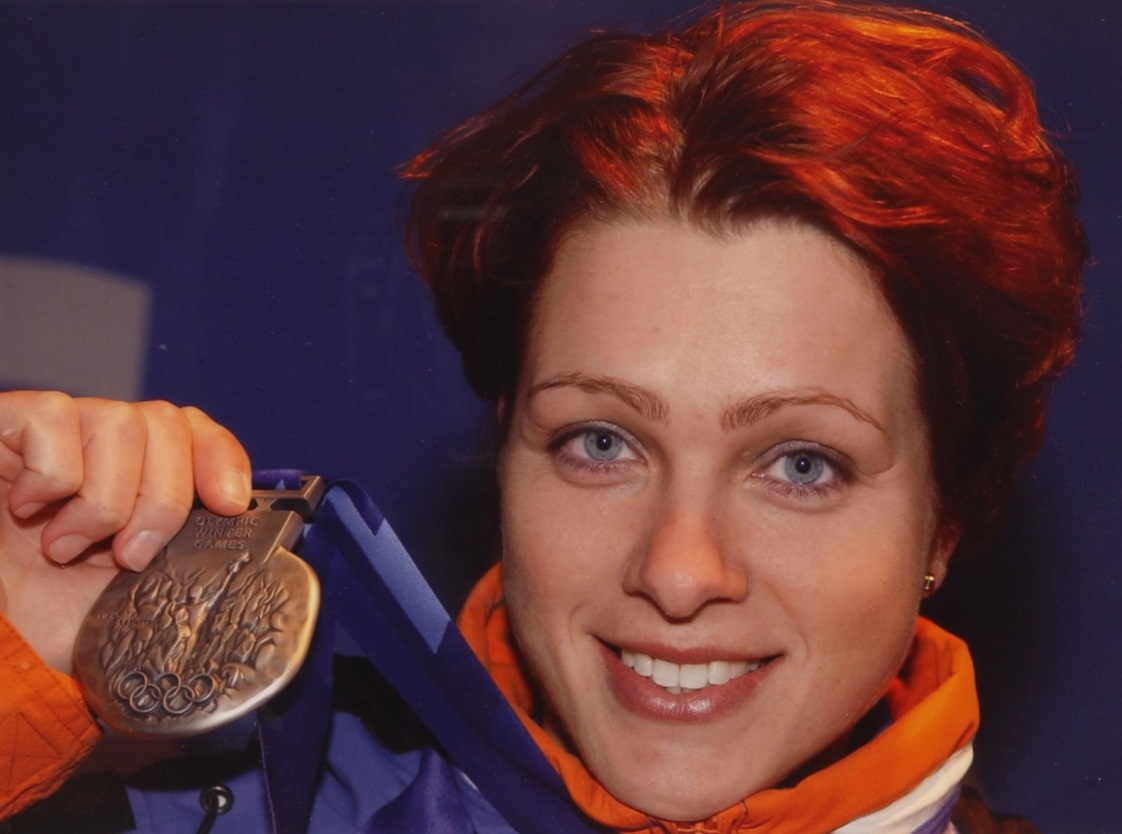
- Smit (w. silver medal Olympic Games 2002)

Personal information
- Born: 20 January 1976 (age 50) Rouveen, Netherlands
- Height: 1.67 m (5 ft 6 in)
- Weight: 60 kg (132 lb)

Sport
- Country: Netherlands
- Sport: Speed skating
Medal record
Speed Skating
Representing the Netherlands
Olympic Games
| Silver medal – second place | 2002 Salt Lake City | 5000 metres |
World Championships
| Silver medal – second place | 2004 Seoul | 3000 metres |
| Silver medal – second place | 2004 Seoul | 5000 metres |
| Bronze medal – third place | 2003 Berlin | 3000 metres |
| Bronze medal – third place | 2003 Berlin | 5000 metres |
Dutch Marathon Championships
| Gold medal – first place | 1995 Ermerzand | Natural Ice |
| Gold medal – first place | 2000 | Artificial Ice |
| Gold medal – first place | 2001 | Artificial Ice |
| Gold medal – first place | 2002 | Artificial Ice |
| Gold medal – first place | 2004 | Artificial Ice |

Grietje "Greta" Smit (born 20 January 1976) is a Dutch former speed skater.

Smit won a surprising silver medal in the 2002 Winter Olympics in the 5000 metre event. She skated a world record broken in a later pair by Claudia Pechstein. Prior to that season, she had not competed in long track speed skating competitions for several years, and had only taken up practice again shortly before the Dutch trials in late 2001.

However, she had been a very successful marathon skater in the years before 2002. She had become Dutch marathon skating champion on natural ice in 1995, 1998, 2000 and 2001, and on artificial ice in 1999, 2000 and 2001. During the last held Elfstedentocht in 1997 she finished second. She also won the alternative Elfstedentocht - skated in Finland - in 1998, 2000 and 2001.

Smit's two sisters, Jenita and Marianne, were also good (marathon) skaters; Jenita also took up long track skating in the 2002/2003 season.

== Personal records ==
Personal records
Speed skating
| Event | Result | Date | Location | Notes |
| 500 m | 42:18 | 7 February 2004 | Vikingskipet, Hamar | |
| 1000 m | 1:28.94 | 26 February 2004 | Deventer | |
| 1500 m | 2:02.02 | 8 February 2004 | Hamar | |
| 3000 m | 4:03.80 | 4 March 2007 | Olympic Oval, Calgary | |
| 5000 m | 6:49.22 | 23 February 2002 | Utah Olympic Oval, Salt Lake City | |

Awards
| Preceded by Andrea Nuyt | Ard Schenk Award; 2003 | Succeeded by Marianne Timmer |
