= Renate Groenewold =

Dutch speed skater and cyclist

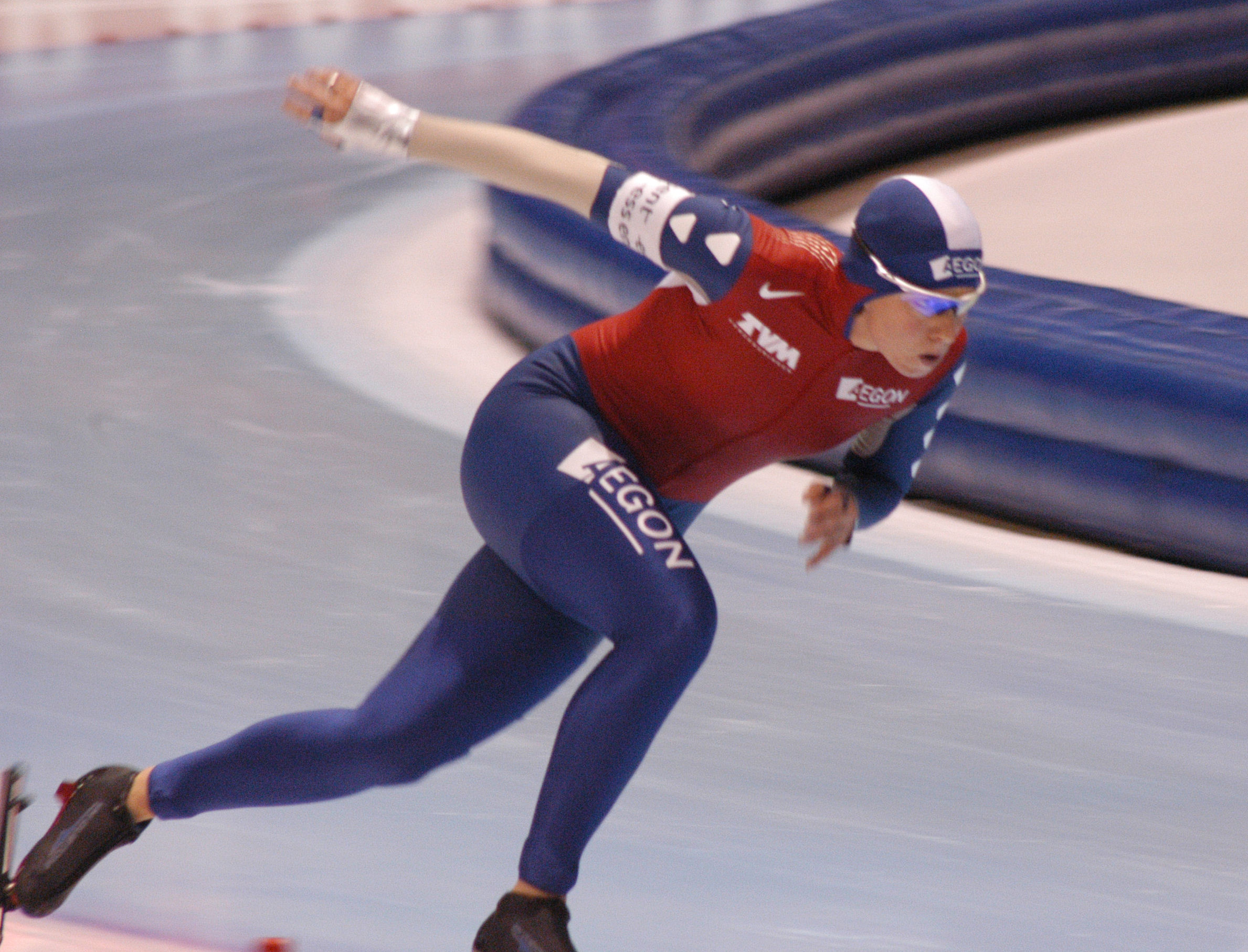
- Groenewold in 2007

Personal information
- Born: Renate Titzia Groenewold; 8 October 1976 (age 49) Veendam, Netherlands
- Height: 1.78 m (5 ft 10 in)
- Weight: 73.5 kg (162 lb)

Sport
- Country: Netherlands
- Sport: Speed skating
- Turned pro: 1997
- Retired: 2010
Medal record
Women's speed skating
Olympic Games
Silver medal – second place	2002 Salt Lake City	3000 m
Silver medal – second place	2006 Turin	3000 m
World Championships
Gold medal – first place	2009 Vancouver	3000 m
Gold medal – first place	2004 Hamar	Allround
Gold medal – first place	2008 Nagano	Team pursuit
Silver medal – second place	2007 Salt Lake City	3000 m
Silver medal – second place	2007 Salt Lake City	Team pursuit
Silver medal – second place	2009 Vancouver	Team pursuit
Bronze medal – third place	2001 Budapest	Allround
European Championships
Silver medal – second place	2006 Hamar	Allround
Bronze medal – third place	2000 Hamar	Allround
Bronze medal – third place	2002 Erfurt	Allround
Bronze medal – third place	2003 Heerenveen	Allround
Bronze medal – third place	2004 Heerenveen	Allround
Bronze medal – third place	2007 Collalbo	Allround

Renate Titzia Groenewold (born 8 October 1976) is a Dutch former long track speed skater and road bicycle racer.

Groenewold has won several Dutch Championships. In 1999, 2002 and 2003 she won the Dutch allround championship. At the European Allround Championships she has won various medals. Five times she came in third in the overall ranking. In 2005, she won the silver medal which was her best result at the European Championships. In 2001, she also came in third in the overall ranking on the World Allround Championships, which she won in 2004.

Besides participating in the all-round championships Groenewold has participated in the championships for individual distances. Her best results there were winning the team pursuit in 2008 and the 3000 meters in 2009.

In 2002 Groenewold participated at the 2002 Winter Olympics. She won the silver medal in the 3000 m. However, on the 1500 m she fell in the second turn. At the 2006 Winter Olympics, rookie compatriot Ireen Wüst beat her to the gold on the 3000 m, leaving Groenewold with silver once more.

In 2007, Groenewold joined Team DSB Bank, which was a women's professional cycling team that competed in international and UCI Women's Road World Cup events. In 2010, Groenewold competed again at the 2010 Winter Olympics, in Vancouver. She falsely listed as one of lesbian athletes at the Games.

After her active skating career she was a coach from 2011 until 2014. In October 2018 she was appointed in the speed skating Technical Committee of the International Skating Union (ISU).

== Personal records ==
Personal records
500 m	39.48	26 January 2002	Olympic Oval, Calgary
1000 m	1:17.16	24 February 2001	Olympic Oval, Calgary
1500 m	1:55.29	20 November 2005	Utah Olympic Oval, Salt Lake City
3000 m	3:55.98	16 November 2007	Olympic Oval, Calgary
5000 m	7:01.21	27 November 2004	Thialf, Heerenveen

Awards
Preceded by Marianne Timmer	Ard Schenk Award; 2005	Succeeded by Marianne Timmer
