= List of the Dutch Speed Skating Championships medalists =

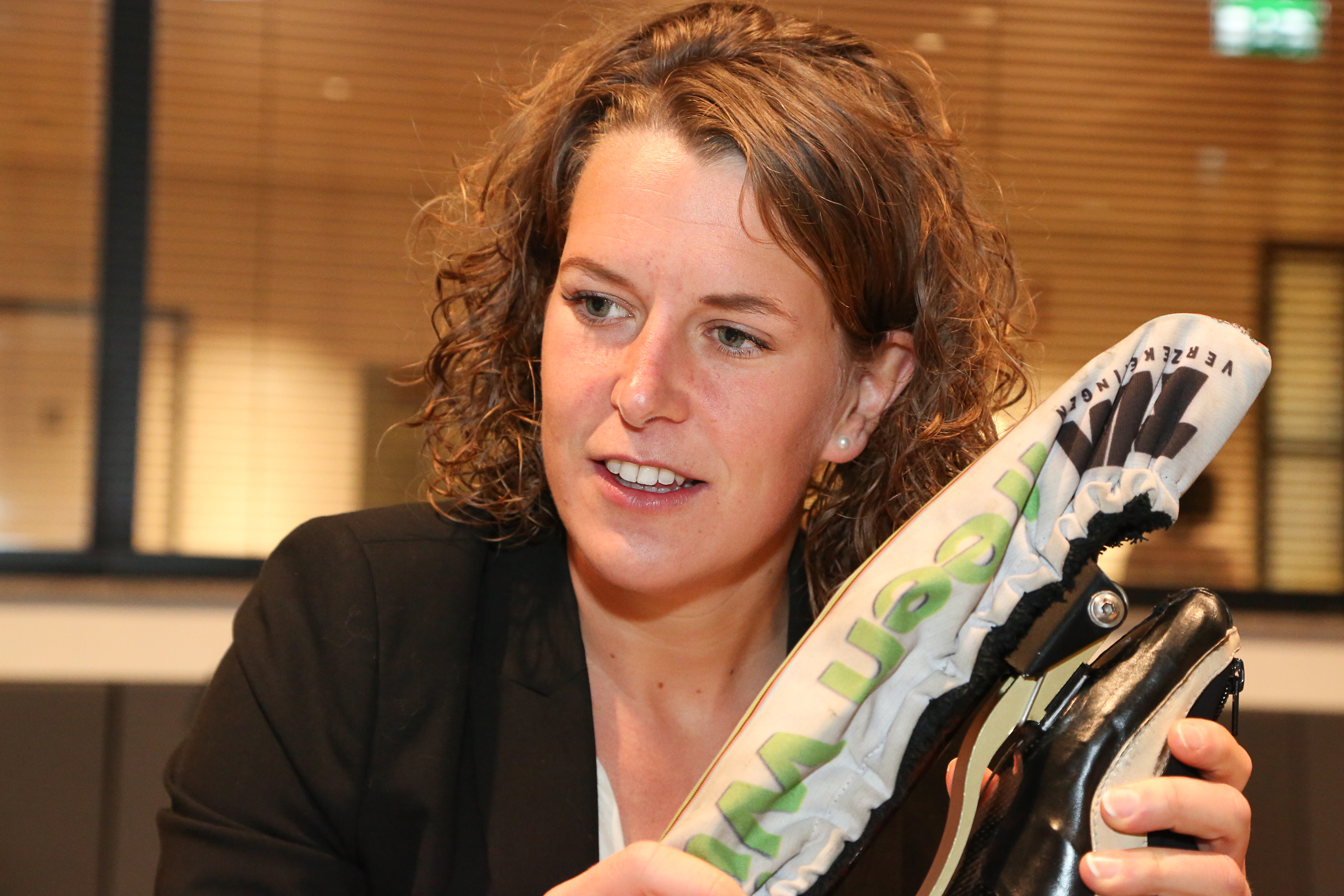
Ireen Wüst – 46-time medalist at the Dutch Speed Skating Championships between 2005 and 2020

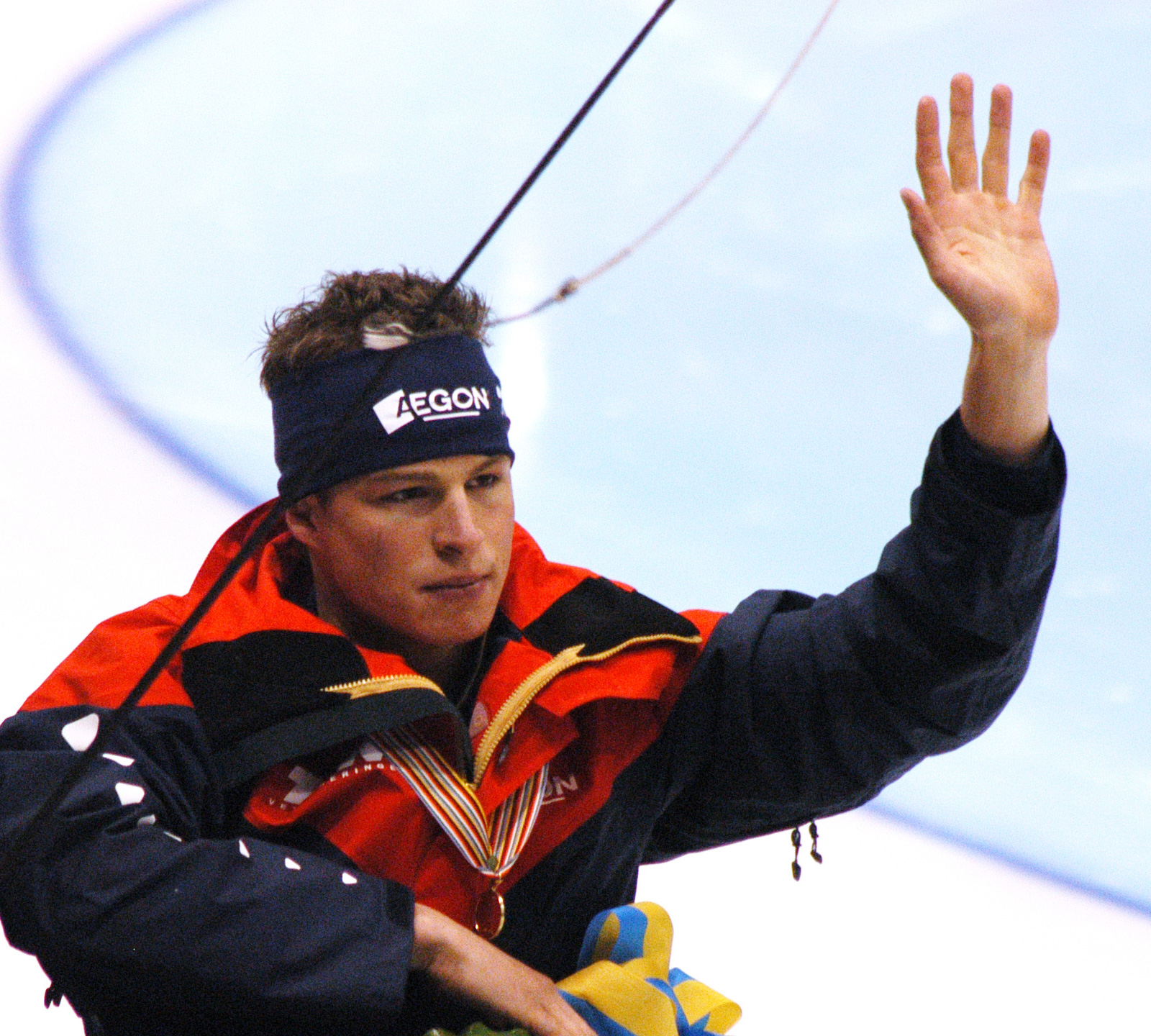
Sven Kramer – 37-time medalist at the Dutch Speed Skating Championships between 2005 and 2020

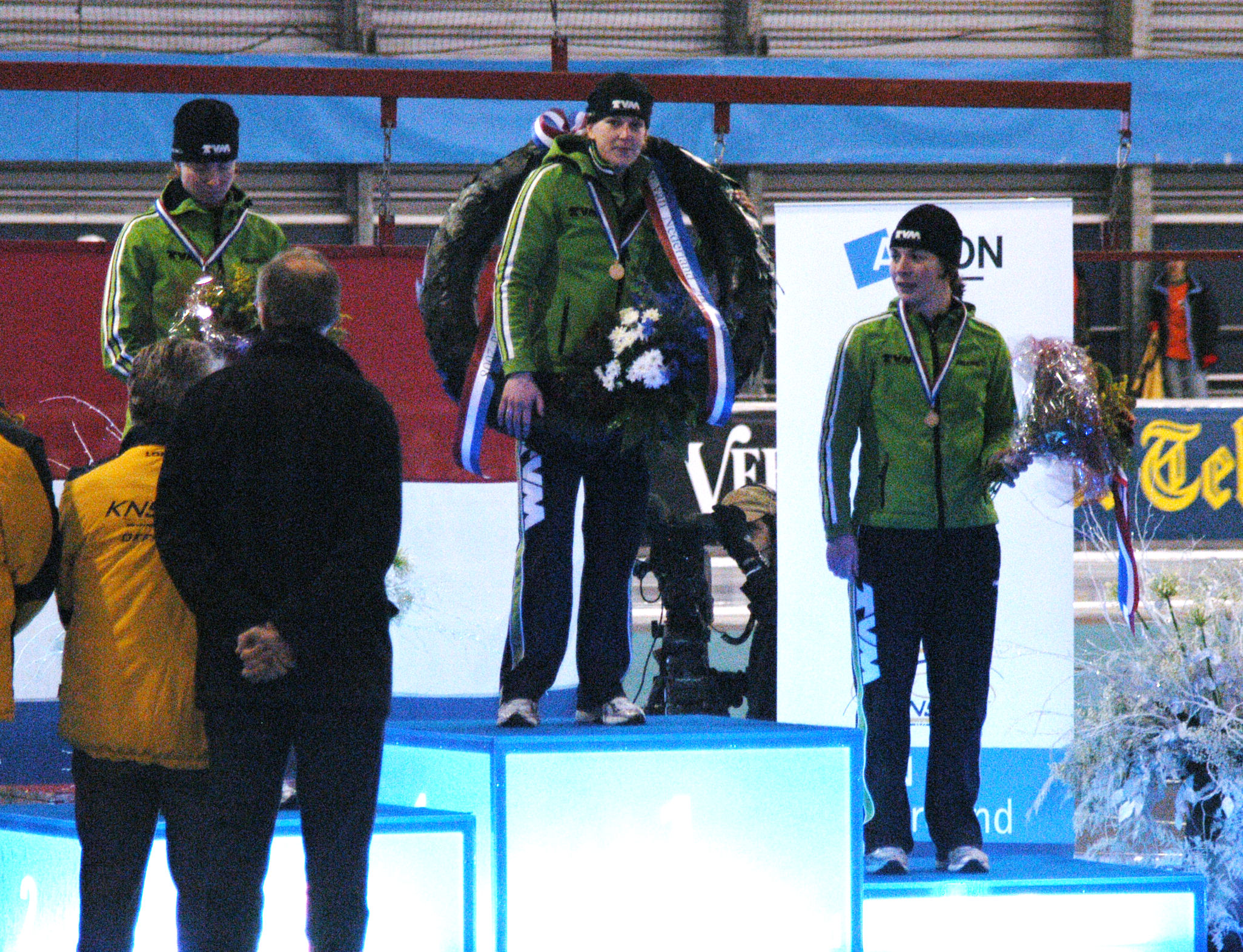
Medalists of the Dutch Allround Championships in 2008; from left: Renate Groenewold (silver), Ireen Wüst (gold), Paulien van Deutekom (bronze)

Medalists of the Dutch Speed Skating Championships refers to athletes who have won medals at the Dutch National Speed Skating Championships in various disciplines, including individual distances, sprint, and allround events.

The first Dutch National Speed Skating Championships were held on 19 January 1887 in Slikkerveer, where Charles Goodman Tebbutt won the one-mile race, defeating Dutch skater Willem Jan van Vollenhoven in the final. This event was unofficial.

Official championships began in 1901 in Leeuwarden, organized by the Royal Dutch Skating Association (Dutch: Koninklijke Nederlandsche Schaatsenrijders Bond). From 1901 to 1954, only men's allround events were held. Women's allround competitions started in 1955. Men's sprint allround events were introduced in 1970, followed by women's sprint in 1983. Since 1987, individual distance championships have been held for men (500 m, 1,000 m, 1,500 m, 5,000 m, and 10,000 m) and women (500 m, 1,000 m, 1,500 m, 3,000 m, and 5,000 m). Competitions are typically held in winter (January, February, March, or December), with medals awarded for the following year.

In the oldest discipline, men's allround, Hilbert van der Duim holds the record with seven consecutive titles from 1979 to 1985. In men's sprint allround, Gerard van Velde, Jan Bos, and Stefan Groothuis each won six titles between 1992 and 2013. Van Velde also leads in the 500 m with eight gold medals (1991–2005). Erben Wennemars and Kjeld Nuis share the record for the 1,000 m with five golds each (Wennemars: 1997–2004; Nuis: 2013–2019). Rintje Ritsma won the 1,500 m six times (1992–1999). Sven Kramer dominates the 5,000 m with ten golds (2007–2018) and also won two silver and two bronze medals in this event. The 10,000 m has seen Bob de Jong, Sven Kramer, and Jorrit Bergsma each win six times (1996–2020). In the men's mass start, Arjan Stroetinga secured four golds (2013–2020).

Among women, Stien Kaiser won the allround event six times (1964–1971). Marianne Timmer dominated the women's sprint allround with ten titles (1997–2008). In individual distances, Christine Aaftink won seven consecutive 500 m golds (1990–1996), Timmer won seven 1,000 m golds (1998–2005), Ireen Wüst secured eight 1,500 m golds (2006–2019) and seven 3,000 m golds (2006–2017), and Carla Zijlstra won six 5,000 m golds (1992–1999). Irene Schouten claimed all seven mass start golds from 2013 to 2020.

Ireen Wüst holds the overall record for women with 46 medals (23 gold, 14 silver, 9 bronze), while Bob de Jong leads men with 31 distance medals. Sven Kramer has 37 medals across all events (26 gold, 5 silver, 6 bronze), though Erben Wennemars has 40 medals but fewer golds.

== Medalists by year ==
=== Men's sprint allround ===
| Year and venue | Gold | Silver | Bronze | Source |
|---|---|---|---|---|
| 1970, Deventer | Jan Bazen | Marten Hoekstra | Jos Valentijn | |
| 1971, Amsterdam | Jan Bazen | Marten Hoekstra | Eppie Bleeker | |
| 1972, Deventer | Jan Bazen | Marten Hoekstra | Anne Brouwer | |
| 1973, Heerenveen | Jos Valentijn | Jan Bazen | Eppie Bleeker | |
| 1974, Assen | Eppie Bleeker | Jan Bazen | Johnny Olof | |
| 1975, Assen | Eppie Bleeker | Jos Valentijn | Jan Bazen | |
| 1976, Groningen | Jos Valentijn | Piet de Boer | Jan Bazen | |
| 1977, Assen | Jos Valentijn | Sies Uilkema | Eppie Bleeker | |
| 1978, Eindhoven | Miel Govaert | Jos Valentijn | Lieuwe de Boer | |
| 1979, Heerenveen | Miel Govaert | Lieuwe de Boer | Jan van de Roemer | |
| 1980, The Hague | Jan van de Roemer | Lieuwe de Boer | Bert de Jong | |
| 1981, Assen | Lieuwe de Boer | Sies Uilkema | Jan van de Roemer | |
| 1982, Heerenveen | Jan Ykema | Miel Govaert | Lieuwe de Boer | |
| 1983, Utrecht | Sies Uilkema | Hein Vergeer | Hilbert van der Duim | |
| 1984, Eindhoven | Hein Vergeer | Geert Kuiper | Ron Ket | |
| 1985, Utrecht | Hein Vergeer | Geert Kuiper | Hilbert van der Duim | |
| 1986, Utrecht | Geert Kuiper | Hein Vergeer | Jan Ykema | |
| 1987, Deventer | Jan Ykema | Geert Kuiper | Menno Boelsma | |
| 1988, Alkmaar | Jan Ykema | Arie Loef | Hein Vergeer | |
| 1989, Heerenveen | Arie Loef | Jan Ykema | Tjerk Terpstra | |
| 1990, Assen | Tjerk Terpstra | Gerjan van de Brink | Menno Boelsma | |
| 1991, Assen | Arie Loef | Hans Janssen | Gerjan van de Brink | |
| 1992, Heerenveen | Gerard van Velde | Jan Jan Brouwer | Menno Boelsma | |
| 1993, Utrecht | Gerard van Velde | Arjan Schreuder | Marco Groeneveld | |
| 1994, The Hague | Nico van der Vlies | Arie Loef | Jakko Jan Leeuwangh | |
| 1995, Alkmaar | Gerard van Velde | Jakko Jan Leeuwangh | Arnold van der Poel | |
| 1996, Assen | Gerard van Velde | Jakko Jan Leeuwangh | Jan Bos | |
| 1997, Groningen | Jan Bos | Gerard van Velde | Erben Wennemars | |
| 1998, Groningen | Jan Bos | Erben Wennemars | Ids Postma | |
| 1999, Groningen | Jan Bos | Jakko Jan Leeuwangh | Erben Wennemars | |
| 2000, Utrecht | Jan Bos | Jakko Jan Leeuwangh | Gerard van Velde | |
| 2001, Heerenveen | Erben Wennemars | Gerard van Velde | Jeroen Straathof | |
| 2002, Groningen | Gerard van Velde | Jan Bos | Erben Wennemars | |
| 2003, Groningen | Jan Bos | Jacques de Koning | Beorn Nijenhuis | |
| 2004, Utrecht | Erben Wennemars | Gerard van Velde | Beorn Nijenhuis | |
| 2005, Groningen | Gerard van Velde | Jan Bos | Jacques de Koning | |
| 2006, Assen | Stefan Groothuis | Gerard van Velde | Beorn Nijenhuis | |
| 2007, Groningen | Erben Wennemars | Jan Bos | Beorn Nijenhuis | |
| 2008, Heerenveen | Jan Bos | Jacques de Koning | Lars Elgersma | |
| 2009, Heerenveen | Stefan Groothuis | Erben Wennemars | Mark Tuitert | |
| 2010, Groningen | Stefan Groothuis | Mark Tuitert | Beorn Nijenhuis | |
| 2011, Heerenveen | Stefan Groothuis | Jan Smeekens | Jan Bos | |
| 2012, Heerenveen | Stefan Groothuis | Hein Otterspeer | Sjoerd de Vries | |
| 2013, Groningen | Stefan Groothuis | Michel Mulder | Hein Otterspeer | |
| 2014, Amsterdam | Michel Mulder | Hein Otterspeer | Kjeld Nuis | |
| 2015, Groningen | Hein Otterspeer | Michel Mulder | Pim Schipper | |
| 2016, Heerenveen | Kai Verbij | Ronald Mulder | Gerben Jorritsma | |
| 2017, Heerenveen | Ronald Mulder | Jan Smeekens | Pim Schipper | |
| 2018, Heerenveen | Dai Dai Ntab | Hein Otterspeer | Thomas Krol | |
| 2019, Heerenveen | Hein Otterspeer | Dai Dai Ntab | Lennart Velema | |
| 2020, Heerenveen | Kjeld Nuis | Lennart Velema | Gijs Esders | |

=== Men's 500 m ===
| Year and venue | Gold | Silver | Bronze | Source |
|---|---|---|---|---|
| 1987, The Hague | Menno Boelsma | Hans Kaats | Bauke Jonkman | |
| 1988, Heerenveen | Maarten Noyens | Jan Ykema | Hans Janssen | |
| 1988, Heerenveen | Maarten Noyens | Jan Ykema | Tjerk Terpstra | |
| 1989, Heerenveen | Jan Ykema | Menno Boelsma | Maarten Noyens | |
| 1990, Heerenveen | Arie Loef | Menno Boelsma | Maarten Noyens | |
| 1991, The Hague | Gerard van Velde | Bauke Jonkman | Hans Janssen | |
| 1992, Heerenveen | Gerard van Velde | Arie Loef | Jan Jan Brouwer | |
| 1993, Deventer | Gerard van Velde | Andries Kramer | Arie Loef | |
| 1994, Heerenveen | Gerard van Velde | Arie Loef | Nico van der Vlies | |
| 1995, The Hague | Andries Kramer | Erben Wennemars | Jakko Jan Leeuwangh | |
| 1996, Groningen | Gerard van Velde | Jan Bos | Maarten Blanken | |
| 1997, The Hague | Gerard van Velde | Andries Kramer | Nico van der Vlies | |
| 1998, Heerenveen | Jan Bos | Erben Wennemars | Jakko Jan Leeuwangh | |
| 1999, Groningen | Jan Bos | Jakko Jan Leeuwangh | Erben Wennemars | |
| 2000, Deventer | Erben Wennemars | Jan Bos | Gerard van Velde | |
| 2001, The Hague | Erben Wennemars | Jan Bos | Jeroen Straathof | |
| 2002, Groningen | Jan Bos | Erben Wennemars | Gerard van Velde | |
| 2003, Utrecht | Erben Wennemars | Gerard van Velde | Jan Bos | |
| 2004, Heerenveen | Gerard van Velde | Erben Wennemars | Jan Bos | |
| 2005, Assen | Gerard van Velde | Beorn Nijenhuis | Erben Wennemars | |
| 2006, Heerenveen | Jan Bos | Beorn Nijenhuis | Erben Wennemars | |
| 2007, Assen | Jan Bos | Jan Smeekens | Erben Wennemars | |
| 2008, Heerenveen | Jan Smeekens | Simon Kuipers | Erben Wennemars | |
| 2009, Heerenveen | Jan Smeekens | Simon Kuipers | Mark Tuitert | |
| 2010, Heerenveen | Jan Smeekens | Ronald Mulder | Mark Tuitert | |
| 2011, Heerenveen | Ronald Mulder | Jan Smeekens | Stefan Groothuis | |
| 2012, Heerenveen | Jan Smeekens | Michel Mulder | Stefan Groothuis | |
| 2013, Heerenveen | Michel Mulder | Jan Smeekens | Hein Otterspeer | |
| 2014, Heerenveen | Jan Smeekens | Ronald Mulder | Michel Mulder | |
| 2015, Heerenveen | Jan Smeekens | Michel Mulder | Pim Schipper | |
| 2016, Heerenveen | Kai Verbij | Jan Smeekens | Ronald Mulder | |
| 2017, Heerenveen | Dai Dai Ntab | Ronald Mulder | Jan Smeekens | |
| 2018, Heerenveen | Dai Dai Ntab | Ronald Mulder | Kai Verbij | |
| 2019, Heerenveen | Ronald Mulder | Dai Dai Ntab | Jan Smeekens | |
| 2020, Heerenveen | Dai Dai Ntab | Jan Smeekens | Kai Verbij | |

=== Men's 1,000 m ===
| Year and venue | Gold | Silver | Bronze | Source |
|---|---|---|---|---|
| 1987, The Hague | Bauke Jonkman | Geert Kuiper | Jaco Mos | |
| 1988, Heerenveen | Jan Ykema | Hein Vergeer | Bauke Jonkman | |
| 1989, Heerenveen | Jan Ykema | – | Menno Boelsma | |
| 1989, Heerenveen | Maarten Noyens | – | Menno Boelsma | |
| 1990, Heerenveen | Arie Loef | Arnold van der Poel | Menno Boelsma | |
| 1991, The Hague | Gerard van Velde | Marco Groeneveld | Erik de Vries | |
| 1992, Heerenveen | Falko Zandstra | Leo Visser | Arnold van der Poel | |
| 1993, Deventer | Marco Groeneveld | Nico van der Vlies | Gerard van Velde | |
| 1994, Heerenveen | Gerard van Velde | Arie Loef | Nico van der Vlies | |
| 1995, The Hague | Gerard van Velde | Arnold van der Poel | Andries Kramer | |
| 1996, Groningen | Gerard van Velde | Jan Bos | Arjan Schreuder | |
| 1997, The Hague | Erben Wennemars | Nico van der Vlies | Andries Kramer | |
| 1998, Heerenveen | Jan Bos | – | Ids Postma | |
| 1998, Heerenveen | Erben Wennemars | – | Ids Postma | |
| 1999, Groningen | Jakko Jan Leeuwangh | Jan Bos | Ids Postma | |
| 2000, Deventer | Erben Wennemars | Jan Bos | Martin Hersman | |
| 2001, The Hague | Erben Wennemars | Jan Bos | Jeroen Straathof | |
| 2002, Groningen | Jan Bos | Gerard van Velde | Erben Wennemars | |
| 2003, Utrecht | Erben Wennemars | Gerard van Velde | Jan Bos | |
| 2004, Heerenveen | Erben Wennemars | Alexander Oltrop | – | |
| 2004, Heerenveen | Erben Wennemars | Gerard van Velde | – | |
| 2005, Assen | Beorn Nijenhuis | Erben Wennemars | Simon Kuipers | |
| 2006, Heerenveen | Jan Bos | Erben Wennemars | Beorn Nijenhuis | |
| 2007, Assen | Jan Bos | Stefan Groothuis | Beorn Nijenhuis | |
| 2008, Heerenveen | Simon Kuipers | Jan Bos | Erben Wennemars | |
| 2009, Heerenveen | Stefan Groothuis | Erben Wennemars | Mark Tuitert | |
| 2010, Heerenveen | Stefan Groothuis | Simon Kuipers | Mark Tuitert | |
| 2011, Heerenveen | Simon Kuipers | Stefan Groothuis | Jan Bos | |
| 2012, Heerenveen | Stefan Groothuis | Sjoerd de Vries | Kjeld Nuis | |
| 2013, Heerenveen | Kjeld Nuis | Hein Otterspeer | Sjoerd de Vries | |
| 2014, Heerenveen | Kjeld Nuis | Koen Verweij | Sjoerd de Vries | |
| 2015, Heerenveen | Kjeld Nuis | Stefan Groothuis | Koen Verweij | |
| 2016, Heerenveen | Kjeld Nuis | Kai Verbij | Stefan Groothuis | |
| 2017, Heerenveen | Kai Verbij | Kjeld Nuis | Ronald Mulder | |
| 2018, Heerenveen | Kai Verbij | Kjeld Nuis | Koen Verweij | |
| 2019, Heerenveen | Kjeld Nuis | Thomas Krol | Kai Verbij | |
| 2020, Heerenveen | Thomas Krol | Kai Verbij | Dai Dai Ntab | |

=== Men's 1,500 m ===
| Year and venue | Gold | Silver | Bronze | Source |
|---|---|---|---|---|
| 1987, Utrecht | Leo Visser | Hein Vergeer | Gerard Kemkers | |
| 1988, Heerenveen | Leo Visser | Annejan Portijk | Hein Vergeer | |
| 1989, Heerenveen | Annejan Portijk | Gerard Kemkers | Leo Visser | |
| 1990, Heerenveen | Ben van der Burg | Leo Visser | Thomas Bos | |
| 1991, The Hague | Leo Visser | Bart Veldkamp | Thomas Bos | |
| 1992, Heerenveen | Rintje Ritsma | Leo Visser | Falko Zandstra | |
| 1993, Deventer | Rintje Ritsma | Falko Zandstra | Jeroen Straathof | |
| 1994, Heerenveen | Rintje Ritsma | Martin Hersman | Ids Postma | |
| 1995, The Hague | Falko Zandstra | Rintje Ritsma | Jeroen Straathof | |
| 1996, Groningen | Rintje Ritsma | Jeroen Straathof | Jan Maarten Heideman | |
| 1997, The Hague | Gijs Buitelaar | Erben Wennemars | Hans Klein-Hesselink | |
| 1998, Heerenveen | Rintje Ritsma | Martin Hersman | Erben Wennemars | |
| 1999, Groningen | Rintje Ritsma | Jeroen Straathof | Jan Bos | |
| 2000, Deventer | Martin Hersman | Jakko Jan Leeuwangh | Jeroen Straathof | |
| 2001, The Hague | Gianni Romme | Mark Tuitert | Erben Wennemars | |
| 2002, Groningen | Martin Hersman | Jakko Jan Leeuwangh | Rintje Ritsma | |
| 2003, Utrecht | Erben Wennemars | Martin Hersman | Mark Tuitert | |
| 2004, Heerenveen | Erben Wennemars | Mark Tuitert | Ids Postma | |
| 2005, Assen | Beorn Nijenhuis | Erben Wennemars | Simon Kuipers | |
| 2006, Heerenveen | Jan Bos | Erben Wennemars | Sven Kramer | |
| 2007, Assen | Sven Kramer | Simon Kuipers | Jan Bos | |
| 2008, Heerenveen | Simon Kuipers | Erben Wennemars | Sven Kramer | |
| 2009, Heerenveen | Sven Kramer | Mark Tuitert | Simon Kuipers | |
| 2010, Heerenveen | Rhian Ket | Mark Tuitert | Stefan Groothuis | |
| 2011, Heerenveen | Simon Kuipers | Mark Tuitert | Stefan Groothuis | |
| 2012, Heerenveen | Stefan Groothuis | Kjeld Nuis | Sjoerd de Vries | |
| 2013, Heerenveen | Kjeld Nuis | Renz Rotteveel | Maurice Vriend | |
| 2014, Heerenveen | Koen Verweij | Kjeld Nuis | Rhian Ket | |
| 2015, Heerenveen | Sven Kramer | Koen Verweij | Thomas Krol | |
| 2016, Heerenveen | Kjeld Nuis | Thomas Krol | Stefan Groothuis | |
| 2017, Heerenveen | Sven Kramer | Kjeld Nuis | Patrick Roest | |
| 2018, Heerenveen | Koen Verweij | Thomas Krol | Sven Kramer | |
| 2019, Heerenveen | Kjeld Nuis | Patrick Roest | Thomas Krol | |
| 2020, Heerenveen | Thomas Krol | Patrick Roest | Koen Verweij | |

=== Men's 5,000 m ===
| Year and venue | Gold | Silver | Bronze | Source |
|---|---|---|---|---|
| 1987, The Hague | Hein Vergeer | Leo Visser | Bert Koopmans | |
| 1988, Heerenveen | Gerard Kemkers | Herbert Dijkstra | Bart Veldkamp | |
| 1989, Heerenveen | Gerard Kemkers | Robert Vunderink | Leo Visser | |
| 1990, Heerenveen | Ben van der Burg | Falko Zandstra | Bart Veldkamp | |
| 1991, The Hague | Bart Veldkamp | Leo Visser | Robert Vunderink | |
| 1992, Heerenveen | Bart Veldkamp | Leo Visser | Robert Vunderink | |
| 1993, Deventer | Rintje Ritsma | Falko Zandstra | Bart Veldkamp | |
| 1994, Heerenveen | Rintje Ritsma | Falko Zandstra | Bart Veldkamp | |
| 1995, The Hague | Rintje Ritsma | Falko Zandstra | Martin Hersman | |
| 1996, Groningen | Gianni Romme | Bob de Jong | Ids Postma | |
| 1997, The Hague | Berry Rohling | Jelmer Beulenkamp | Maurijn de Wit | |
| 1998, Heerenveen | Rintje Ritsma | Jelmer Beulenkamp | Bob de Jong | |
| 1999, Groningen | Gianni Romme | Rintje Ritsma | Carl Verheijen | |
| 2000, Deventer | Bob de Jong | Carl Verheijen | Martin Hersman | |
| 2001, The Hague | Gianni Romme | Rintje Ritsma | Bob de Jong | |
| 2002, Groningen | Gianni Romme | Bob de Jong | Rintje Ritsma | |
| 2003, Utrecht | Gianni Romme | Carl Verheijen | Ids Postma | |
| 2004, Heerenveen | Carl Verheijen | Jochem Uytdehaage | Bob de Jong | |
| 2005, Assen | Bob de Jong | Carl Verheijen | Gianni Romme | |
| 2006, Heerenveen | Carl Verheijen | Sven Kramer | Bob de Jong | |
| 2007, Assen | Sven Kramer | Carl Verheijen | Bob de Jong | |
| 2008, Heerenveen | Sven Kramer | Carl Verheijen | Wouter Olde Heuvel | |
| 2009, Heerenveen | Sven Kramer | Carl Verheijen | Wouter Olde Heuvel | |
| 2010, Heerenveen | Sven Kramer | Bob de Jong | Wouter Olde Heuvel | |
| 2011, Heerenveen | Bob de Vries | Wouter Olde Heuvel | Jorrit Bergsma | |
| 2012, Heerenveen | Jorrit Bergsma | Bob de Jong | Sven Kramer | |
| 2013, Heerenveen | Sven Kramer | Jan Blokhuijsen | Jorrit Bergsma | |
| 2014, Heerenveen | Sven Kramer | Jorrit Bergsma | Bob de Jong | |
| 2015, Heerenveen | Sven Kramer | Jorrit Bergsma | Wouter Olde Heuvel | |
| 2016, Heerenveen | Sven Kramer | Jorrit Bergsma | Douwe de Vries | |
| 2017, Heerenveen | Sven Kramer | Jorrit Bergsma | Douwe de Vries | |
| 2018, Heerenveen | Sven Kramer | Jorrit Bergsma | Erik Jan Kooiman | |
| 2019, Heerenveen | Patrick Roest | Jorrit Bergsma | Sven Kramer | |
| 2020, Heerenveen | Patrick Roest | Sven Kramer | Jorrit Bergsma | |

=== Men's 10,000 m ===
| Year and venue | Gold | Silver | Bronze | Source |
|---|---|---|---|---|
| 1987, Utrecht | Robert Vunderink | Herbert Dijkstra | Leo Visser | |
| 1988, Heerenveen | Leo Visser | Gerard Kemkers | Herbert Dijkstra | |
| 1989, Heerenveen | Robert Vunderink | Thomas Bos | Leo Visser | |
| 1990, Heerenveen | Thomas Bos | Bart Veldkamp | Robert Vunderink | |
| 1991, The Hague | Bart Veldkamp | Robert Vunderink | Arnold Stam | |
| 1992, Heerenveen | Bart Veldkamp | Robert Vunderink | Thomas Bos | |
| 1993, Deventer | Falko Zandstra | Bart Veldkamp | Rintje Ritsma | |
| 1994, Heerenveen | Falko Zandstra | Rintje Ritsma | Ids Postma | |
| 1995, The Hague | Rintje Ritsma | Falko Zandstra | Bob de Jong | |
| 1996, Groningen | Bob de Jong | Gianni Romme | Carl Verheijen | |
| 1997, The Hague | Berry Rohling | Jurgen Meijer | Jelmer Beulenkamp | |
| 1998, Heerenveen | Bob de Jong | Falko Zandstra | Jelmer Beulenkamp | |
| 1999, Groningen | Bob de Jong | Gianni Romme | Carl Verheijen | |
| 2000, Deventer | Jochem Uytdehaage | Bob de Jong | Brigt Rykkje | |
| 2001, The Hague | Carl Verheijen | Bob de Jong | Jochem Uytdehaage | |
| 2002, Groningen | Casper Helling | Brigt Rykkje | Jarno Meijer | |
| 2003, Utrecht | Henk Angenent | Bob de Jong | Carl Verheijen | |
| 2004, Heerenveen | Jochem Uytdehaage | Carl Verheijen | Bob de Jong | |
| 2005, Assen | Bob de Jong | Gianni Romme | Brigt Rykkje | |
| 2006, Heerenveen | Carl Verheijen | Sven Kramer | Bob de Jong | |
| 2007, Assen | Sven Kramer | Carl Verheijen | Bob de Jong | |
| 2008, Heerenveen | Sven Kramer | Bob de Jong | Brigt Rykkje | |
| 2009, Heerenveen | Sven Kramer | Carl Verheijen | Bob de Jong | |
| 2010, Heerenveen | Sven Kramer | Bob de Jong | Carl Verheijen | |
| 2011, Heerenveen | Bob de Jong | Bob de Vries | Jorrit Bergsma | |
| 2012, Heerenveen | Bob de Jong | Jorrit Bergsma | Sven Kramer | |
| 2013, Heerenveen | Jorrit Bergsma | Bob de Jong | Jan Blokhuijsen | |
| 2014, Heerenveen | Sven Kramer | Jorrit Bergsma | Bob de Jong | |
| 2015, Heerenveen | Jorrit Bergsma | Bob de Jong | Erik Jan Kooiman | |
| 2016, Heerenveen | Sven Kramer | Erik Jan Kooiman | Bob de Vries | |
| 2017, Heerenveen | Jorrit Bergsma | Sven Kramer | Bob de Vries | |
| 2018, Heerenveen | Jorrit Bergsma | Sven Kramer | Erik Jan Kooiman | |
| 2019, Heerenveen | Jorrit Bergsma | Patrick Roest | Douwe de Vries | |
| 2020, Heerenveen | Jorrit Bergsma | Patrick Roest | Marwin Talsma | |

=== Men's mass start ===
| Year and venue | Gold | Silver | Bronze | Source |
|---|---|---|---|---|
| 2013, Heerenveen | Arjan Stroetinga | Gary Hekman | Johan Knol | |
| 2014, Heerenveen | Arjan Stroetinga | Christijn Grooeneveld | Frank Vreugdenhil | |
| 2015, Groningen | Arjan Stroetinga | Evert Hoolwerf | Ingmar Berga | |
| 2016, Heerenveen | Willem Hoolwerf | Thom van Beek | Douwe de Vries | |
| 2017, Heerenveen | Gary Hekman | Arjan Stroetinga | Jan Blokhuijsen | |
| 2019, Heerenveen | Douwe de Vries | Victor Ramler | Arjan Stroetinga | |
| 2020, Heerenveen | Arjan Stroetinga | Koen Verweij | Jan Blokhuijsen | |

=== Men's allround ===
| Year and venue | Gold | Silver | Bronze | Source |
|---|---|---|---|---|
| 1901, Leeuwarden | Eeko Banning | Sytze Bouma | – | |
| 1903, Groningen | Coen de Koning | Jan Greve | Bernhard Bezemer | |
| 1905, Deventer | Coen de Koning | Jan Greve | Bernhard Bezemer | |
| 1912, Leeuwarden | Coen de Koning | Tamme Geertsema | Jacques P. de Koning | |
| 1914, Zwolle | Jacques P. de Koning | Jan Harke Bakker | Marinus Zwart | |
| 1917, Veendam | Jan Harke Bakker | Anton Wilkens | Jacques P. de Koning | |
| 1919, Zwolle | Max Tetzner | Jacques P. de Koning | Albert Wajer | |
| 1922, Groningen | Max Tetzner | Jan Harke Bakker | Harrie Krul | |
| 1929, Groningen | Dolf van der Scheer | Siem Heiden | Teun Hooftman | |
| 1933, Heerenveen | Dolf van der Scheer | Lou Dijkstra | Jan Langedijk | |
| 1940, Groningen | Jan Langedijk | Roelof Koops | Jan Roos | |
| 1941, Bergen | Herman Buyen | Jan Langedijk | Roelof Koops | |
| 1942, Zutphen | Herman Buyen | Jaap Havekotte | Piet Keijzer | |
| 1946, Heerenveen | Piet Keijzer | Herman Buyen | Siem van Hoorn | |
| 1947, Rotterdam | Jan Langedijk | Frans Verbiezen | Jaap Havekotte | |
| 1951, Zutphen | Kees Broekman | Gerard Maarse | Jan Charisius | |
| 1954, Zwolle | Egbert van 't Oever | Cockie van der Elst | Jan Wervers | |
| 1955, Heerenveen | Gerard Maarse | Egbert van 't Oever | Wim de Graaff | |
| 1956, Rotterdam | Wim de Graaff | Jeen van den Berg | Gerard Maarse | |
| 1962, Amsterdam | Henk van der Grift | Chris Meeuwisse | Arnold Vroege | |
| 1963, Groningen | Rudie Liebrechts | Arie Zee | Chris Meeuwisse | |
| 1964, Deventer | Rudie Liebrechts | Ard Schenk | Piet Meijer | |
| 1965, Amsterdam | Ard Schenk | Rudie Liebrechts | Kees Verkerk | |
| 1966, Deventer | Kees Verkerk | Ard Schenk | Rudie Liebrechts | |
| 1967, Amsterdam | Kees Verkerk | Ard Schenk | Peter Nottet | |
| 1968, Amsterdam | Ard Schenk | Peter Nottet | Jan Bols | |
| 1969, Heerenveen | Kees Verkerk | Jan Bols | Ard Schenk | |
| 1970, Deventer | Ard Schenk | Jan Bols | Jappie van Dijk | |
| 1971, Amsterdam | Jan Bols | Ard Schenk | Eddy Verheijen | |
| 1972, Deventer | Kees Verkerk | Jan Bols | Eddy Verheijen | |
| 1973, Heerenveen | Jappie van Dijk | Piet Kleine | Hans van Helden | |
| 1974, Assen | Harm Kuipers | Piet Kleine | Jan Derksen | |
| 1975, Assen | Harm Kuipers | Piet Kleine | Jan Derksen | |
| 1976, Groningen | Hans van Helden | Piet Kleine | Joop Pasman | |
| 1977, Assen | Hans van Helden | Piet Kleine | Klaas Vriend | |
| 1978, Eindhoven | Piet Kleine | Hilbert van der Duim | Joop Pasman | |
| 1979, Heerenveen | Hilbert van der Duim | Yep Kramer | Klaas Vriend | |
| 1980, The Hague | Hilbert van der Duim | Yep Kramer | Piet Kleine | |
| 1981, Assen | Hilbert van der Duim | Piet Kleine | Frits Schalij | |
| 1982, Heerenveen | Hilbert van der Duim | Frits Schalij | Rolf Sibrandy | |
| 1983, Deventer | Hilbert van der Duim | Robert Vunderink | Frits Schalij | |
| 1984, Groningen | Hilbert van der Duim | Frits Schalij | Yep Kramer | |
| 1985, Alkmaar | Hilbert van der Duim | Hein Vergeer | Frits Schalij | |
| 1986, Assen | Hein Vergeer | Gerard Kemkers | Frits Schalij | |
| 1987, Deventer | Hein Vergeer | Gerard Kemkers | Leo Visser | |
| 1988, Alkmaar | Leo Visser | Gerard Kemkers | Annejan Portijk | |
| 1989, The Hague | Leo Visser | Gerard Kemkers | Bart Veldkamp | |
| 1990, Assen | Ben van der Burg | Gerard Kemkers | Thomas Bos | |
| 1991, Alkmaar | Leo Visser | Bart Veldkamp | Ben van der Burg | |
| 1992, Alkmaar | Falko Zandstra | Bart Veldkamp | Rintje Ritsma | |
| 1993, Assen | Falko Zandstra | Bart Veldkamp | Rintje Ritsma | |
| 1994, The Hague | Ids Postma | Rintje Ritsma | Bart Veldkamp | |
| 1995, Assen | Falko Zandstra | Rintje Ritsma | Bart Veldkamp | |
| 1996, The Hague | Rintje Ritsma | Ids Postma | Martin Hersman | |
| 1997, Assen | Rintje Ritsma | Falko Zandstra | Gianni Romme | |
| 1998, Deventer | Jelmer Beulenkamp | Carl Verheijen | Jochem Uytdehaage | |
| 1999, The Hague | Ids Postma | Jochem Uytdehaage | Bob de Jong | |
| 2000, The Hague | Gianni Romme | Rintje Ritsma | Ids Postma | |
| 2001, Heerenveen | Jochem Uytdehaage | Ids Postma | Mark Tuitert | |
| 2002, Alkmaar | Gianni Romme | Ids Postma | Jarno Meijer | |
| 2003, Assen | Gianni Romme | Mark Tuitert | Rintje Ritsma | |
| 2004, Eindhoven | Jochem Uytdehaage | Carl Verheijen | Mark Tuitert | |
| 2005, Heerenveen | Sven Kramer | Carl Verheijen | Mark Tuitert | |
| 2006, Utrecht | Mark Tuitert | Rintje Ritsma | Bob de Jong | |
| 2007, Heerenveen | Sven Kramer | Carl Verheijen | Erben Wennemars | |
| 2008, Groningen | Sven Kramer | Wouter Olde Heuvel | Ben Jongejan | |
| 2009, Heerenveen | Sven Kramer | Wouter Olde Heuvel | Carl Verheijen | |
| 2010, Heerenveen | Wouter Olde Heuvel | Ted-Jan Bloemen | Koen Verweij | |
| 2011, Heerenveen | Wouter Olde Heuvel | Koen Verweij | Jan Blokhuijsen | |
| 2012, Heerenveen | Ted-Jan Bloemen | Koen Verweij | Ben Jongejan | |
| 2013, Heerenveen | Sven Kramer | Jan Blokhuijsen | Renz Rotteveel | |
| 2014, Amsterdam | Koen Verweij | Renz Rotteveel | Wouter Olde Heuvel | |
| 2015, Heerenveen | Sven Kramer | Wouter Olde Heuvel | Koen Verweij | |
| 2016, Heerenveen | Jan Blokhuijsen | Douwe de Vries | Patrick Roest | |
| 2017, Heerenveen | Jan Blokhuijsen | Patrick Roest | Marcel Bosker | |
| 2018, Heerenveen | Marcel Bosker | Lex Dijkstra | Thomas Geerdinck | |
| 2019, Heerenveen | Douwe de Vries | Marcel Bosker | Chris Huizinga | |
| 2020, Heerenveen | Jan Blokhuijsen | Marcel Bosker | Douwe de Vries | |

=== Women's sprint allround ===
| Year and venue | Gold | Silver | Bronze | Source |
|---|---|---|---|---|
| 1983, Utrecht | Alie Boorsma | Yvonne van Gennip | Thea Limbach | |
| 1984, Eindhoven | Yvonne van Gennip | Els Meijer | Alie Boorsma | |
| 1985, Utrecht | Yvonne van Gennip | Alie Boorsma | Els Meijer | |
| 1986, Utrecht | Petra Moolhuizen | Yvonne van Gennip | Marieke Stam | |
| 1987, Deventer | Christine Aaftink | Els Meijer | Boukje Keulen | |
| 1988, Alkmaar | Christine Aaftink | Ingrid Haringa | Mariska Hekkers | |
| 1989, Heerenveen | Christine Aaftink | Anita Loorbach | Anja Bollaart | |
| 1990, Assen | Christine Aaftink | Marion van Zuilen | Anita Loorbach | |
| 1991, Assen | Marieke Stam | Christine Aaftink | Herma Meijer | |
| 1992, Heerenveen | Christine Aaftink | Anita Loorbach | Marieke Stam | |
| 1993, Utrecht | Christine Aaftink | Herma Meijer | Marieke Stam | |
| 1994, The Hague | Christine Aaftink | Sandra Zwolle | Leontine van Meggelen | |
| 1995, Alkmaar | Annamarie Thomas | Sandra Zwolle | Christine Aaftink | |
| 1996, Assen | Annamarie Thomas | Christine Aaftink | Andrea Nuyt | |
| 1997, Groningen | Marianne Timmer | Annamarie Thomas | Sandra Zwolle | |
| 1998, Groningen | Marianne Timmer | Annamarie Thomas | Andrea Nuyt | |
| 1999, Groningen | Marianne Timmer | Andrea Nuyt | Tonny de Jong | |
| 2000, Utrecht | Andrea Nuyt | Marianne Timmer | Marieke Wijsman | |
| 2001, Heerenveen | Marianne Timmer | Andrea Nuyt | Frouke Oonk | |
| 2002, Groningen | Andrea Nuyt | Annamarie Thomas | Marieke Wijsman | |
| 2003, Groningen | Marianne Timmer | Marieke Wijsman | Frouke Oonk | |
| 2004, Utrecht | Marianne Timmer | Andrea Nuyt | Annamarie Thomas | |
| 2005, Groningen | Marianne Timmer | Frouke Oonk | Annette Gerritsen | |
| 2006, Assen | Marianne Timmer | Sanne van der Star | Annette Gerritsen | |
| 2007, Groningen | Marianne Timmer | Annette Gerritsen | Margot Boer | |
| 2008, Heerenveen | Marianne Timmer | Ireen Wüst | Margot Boer | |
| 2009, Heerenveen | Margot Boer | Natasja Bruintjes | Laurine van Riessen | |
| 2010, Groningen | Annette Gerritsen | Margot Boer | Laurine van Riessen | |
| 2011, Heerenveen | Margot Boer | Annette Gerritsen | Laurine van Riessen | |
| 2012, Heerenveen | Margot Boer | Thijsje Oenema | Marrit Leenstra | |
| 2013, Groningen | Marrit Leenstra | Margot Boer | Laurine van Riessen | |
| 2014, Amsterdam | Margot Boer | Lotte van Beek | Thijsje Oenema | |
| 2015, Groningen | Thijsje Oenema | Laurine van Riessen | Margot Boer | |
| 2016, Heerenveen | Sanneke de Neeling | Marrit Leenstra | Margot Boer | |
| 2017, Heerenveen | Ireen Wüst | Anice Das | Sanneke de Neeling | |
| 2018, Heerenveen | Letitia de Jong | Anice Das | Sanneke de Neeling | |
| 2019, Heerenveen | Jutta Leerdam | Letitia de Jong | Sanneke de Neeling | |
| 2020, Heerenveen | Letitia de Jong | Jorien ter Mors | Femke Kok | |

=== Women's 500 m ===
| Year and venue | Gold | Silver | Bronze | Source |
|---|---|---|---|---|
| 1987, The Hague | Ingrid Haringa | Yvonne van Gennip | Christine Aaftink | |
| 1988, Heerenveen | Ingrid Haringa | Christine Aaftink | Herma Meijer | |
| 1989, Heerenveen | Herma Meijer | Marieke Stam | Christine Aaftink | |
| 1990, Heerenveen | Christine Aaftink | Herma Meijer | Sandra Voetelink | |
| 1991, Haarlem | Christine Aaftink | Marieke Stam | Anita Loorbach | |
| 1992, Heerenveen | Christine Aaftink | Sandra Voetelink | Anita Loorbach | |
| 1993, Deventer | Christine Aaftink | Herma Meijer | Renske Vellinga | |
| 1994, Heerenveen | Christine Aaftink | Sandra Voetelink | Sandra Zwolle | |
| 1995, The Hague | Christine Aaftink | Anita Loorbach | Sandra Zwolle | |
| 1996, Groningen | Christine Aaftink | Marianne Timmer | Andrea Nuyt | |
| 1997, The Hague | Judith Straathof | Frouke Oonk | Andrea Nuyt | |
| 1998, Heerenveen | Andrea Nuyt | Marianne Timmer | Sandra Zwolle | |
| 1999, Groningen | Andrea Nuyt | Marianne Timmer | Sandra Zwolle | |
| 2000, Deventer | Andrea Nuyt | Marianne Timmer | Frouke Oonk | |
| 2001, The Hague | Andrea Nuyt | Marianne Timmer | Christine Heins | |
| 2002, Groningen | Andrea Nuyt | Marianne Timmer | Yvonne Leever | |
| 2003, Utrecht | Marianne Timmer | Andrea Nuyt | Yvonne Leever | |
| 2004, Heerenveen | Marianne Timmer | Andrea Nuyt | Yvonne Leever | |
| 2005, Assen | Marianne Timmer | Frouke Oonk | Annette Gerritsen | |
| 2006, Heerenveen | Marianne Timmer | Annette Gerritsen | Sanne van der Star | |
| 2007, Assen | Margot Boer | Marianne Timmer | Annette Gerritsen | |
| 2008, Heerenveen | Annette Gerritsen | Margot Boer | Marianne Timmer | |
| 2009, Heerenveen | Annette Gerritsen | Margot Boer | Thijsje Oenema | |
| 2010, Heerenveen | Annette Gerritsen | Margot Boer | Marianne Timmer | |
| 2011, Heerenveen | Margot Boer | Laurine van Riessen | Marrit Leenstra | |
| 2012, Heerenveen | Thijsje Oenema | Margot Boer | Annette Gerritsen | |
| 2013, Heerenveen | Thijsje Oenema | Margot Boer | Laurine van Riessen | |
| 2014, Heerenveen | Margot Boer | Laurine van Riessen | Thijsje Oenema | |
| 2015, Heerenveen | Margot Boer | Thijsje Oenema | Bo van der Werff | |
| 2016, Heerenveen | Margot Boer | Janine Smit | Marrit Leenstra | |
| 2017, Heerenveen | Jorien ter Mors | Floor van den Brandt | Anice Das | |
| 2018, Heerenveen | Jorien ter Mors | Marrit Leenstra | Sanneke de Neeling | |
| 2019, Heerenveen | Janine Smit | Letitia de Jong | Jutta Leerdam | |
| 2020, Heerenveen | Jutta Leerdam | Letitia de Jong | Femke Kok | |

=== Women's 1,000 m ===
| Year and venue | Gold | Silver | Bronze | Source |
|---|---|---|---|---|
| 1987, The Hague | Petra Moolhuizen | Yvonne van Gennip | Christine Aaftink | |
| 1988, Heerenveen | Ingrid Haringa | Anja Bollaart | Marga Preuter | |
| 1989, Heerenveen | Ingrid Haringa | Christine Aaftink | Sandra Voetelink | |
| 1990, Heerenveen | Christine Aaftink | Anita Loorbach | Marieke Stam | |
| 1991, Haarlem | Christine Aaftink | Marieke Stam | Anita Loorbach | |
| 1992, Heerenveen | Christine Aaftink | Sandra Voetelink | Herma Meijer | |
| 1993, Deventer | Christine Aaftink | Renske Vellinga | Leontine van Meggelen | |
| 1994, Heerenveen | Christine Aaftink | Marianne Timmer | Sandra Zwolle | |
| 1995, The Hague | Sandra Zwolle | Christine Aaftink | Leontine van Meggelen | |
| 1996, Groningen | Sandra Zwolle | Christine Aaftink | Marianne Timmer | |
| 1997, The Hague | Judith Straathof | Frouke Oonk | Andrea Nuyt | |
| 1998, Heerenveen | Marianne Timmer | Annamarie Thomas | Sandra Zwolle | |
| 1999, Groningen | Marianne Timmer | Tonny de Jong | Annamarie Thomas | |
| 2000, Deventer | Marianne Timmer | Andrea Nuyt | Sandra 't Hart | |
| 2001, The Hague | Andrea Nuyt | Tonny de Jong | Marianne Timmer | |
| 2002, Groningen | Marianne Timmer | Renate Groenewold | Andrea Nuyt | |
| 2003, Utrecht | Marianne Timmer | Renate Groenewold | Annamarie Thomas | |
| 2004, Heerenveen | Marianne Timmer | Annamarie Thomas | Andrea Nuyt | |
| 2005, Assen | Marianne Timmer | Renate Groenewold | Annamarie Thomas | |
| 2006, Heerenveen | Ireen Wüst | Marianne Timmer | Annette Gerritsen | |
| 2007, Assen | Ireen Wüst | Annette Gerritsen | Marianne Timmer | |
| 2008, Heerenveen | Paulien van Deutekom | Annette Gerritsen | Ireen Wüst | |
| 2009, Heerenveen | Paulien van Deutekom | Annette Gerritsen | Natasja Bruintjes | |
| 2010, Heerenveen | Annette Gerritsen | Margot Boer | Marianne Timmer | |
| 2011, Heerenveen | Marrit Leenstra | Margot Boer | Laurine van Riessen | |
| 2012, Heerenveen | Thijsje Oenema | Marrit Leenstra | Ireen Wüst | |
| 2013, Heerenveen | Marrit Leenstra | Lotte van Beek | Diane Valkenburg | |
| 2014, Heerenveen | Marrit Leenstra | Ireen Wüst | Lotte van Beek | |
| 2015, Heerenveen | Marrit Leenstra | Ireen Wüst | Laurine van Riessen | |
| 2016, Heerenveen | Jorien ter Mors | Marrit Leenstra | Ireen Wüst | |
| 2017, Heerenveen | Jorien ter Mors | Marrit Leenstra | Ireen Wüst | |
| 2018, Heerenveen | Jorien ter Mors | Marrit Leenstra | Ireen Wüst | |
| 2019, Heerenveen | Ireen Wüst | Antoinette de Jong | Jutta Leerdam | |
| 2020, Heerenveen | Jutta Leerdam | Letitia de Jong | Ireen Wüst | |

=== Women's 1,500 m ===
| Year and venue | Gold | Silver | Bronze | Source |
|---|---|---|---|---|
| 1987, Utrecht | Yvonne van Gennip | Petra Moolhuizen | Ingrid Paul | |
| 1988, Heerenveen | Yvonne van Gennip | Marieke Stam | Grietje Mulder | |
| 1989, Heerenveen | Yvonne van Gennip | Ingrid Paul | Marieke Stam | |
| 1990, Heerenveen | Herma Meijer | Marieke Stam | Jolanda Grimbergen | |
| 1991, Haarlem | Lia van Schie | Marieke Stam | Herma Meijer | |
| 1992, Heerenveen | Sandra Voetelink | Yvonne van Gennip | Lia van Schie | |
| 1993, Deventer | Barbara de Loor | Carla Zijlstra | Leontine van Meggelen | |
| 1994, Heerenveen | Annamarie Thomas | Tonny de Jong | Carla Zijlstra | |
| 1995, The Hague | Annamarie Thomas | Tonny de Jong | Renate Groenewold | |
| 1996, Groningen | Marieke Wijsman | Marianne Timmer | Sandra 't Hart | |
| 1997, The Hague | Judith Straathof | Frouke Oonk | Martine Oosting | |
| 1998, Heerenveen | Annamarie Thomas | Marianne Timmer | Tonny de Jong | |
| 1999, Groningen | Barbara de Loor | Tonny de Jong | Annamarie Thomas | |
| 2000, Deventer | Wieteke Cramer | Sandra 't Hart | Barbara de Loor | |
| 2001, The Hague | Renate Groenewold | Barbara de Loor | Tonny de Jong | |
| 2002, Groningen | Tonny de Jong | Marianne Timmer | Frédérique Ankoné | |
| 2003, Utrecht | Renate Groenewold | Annamarie Thomas | Barbara de Loor | |
| 2004, Heerenveen | Annamarie Thomas | Marja Vis | Marianne Timmer | |
| 2005, Assen | Renate Groenewold | Marianne Timmer | Frédérique Ankoné | |
| 2006, Heerenveen | Ireen Wüst | Paulien van Deutekom | Renate Groenewold | |
| 2007, Assen | Ireen Wüst | Renate Groenewold | Paulien van Deutekom | |
| 2008, Heerenveen | Paulien van Deutekom | Ireen Wüst | Diane Valkenburg | |
| 2008, Heerenveen | Paulien van Deutekom | Ireen Wüst | Marrit Leenstra | |
| 2009, Heerenveen | Paulien van Deutekom | Ireen Wüst | Marrit Leenstra | |
| 2010, Heerenveen | Annette Gerritsen | Ireen Wüst | Diane Valkenburg | |
| 2011, Heerenveen | Ireen Wüst | Marrit Leenstra | Laurine van Riessen | |
| 2012, Heerenveen | Ireen Wüst | Marrit Leenstra | Diane Valkenburg | |
| 2013, Heerenveen | Ireen Wüst | Lotte van Beek | Marrit Leenstra | |
| 2014, Heerenveen | Jorien ter Mors | Lotte van Beek | Ireen Wüst | |
| 2015, Heerenveen | Ireen Wüst | Marrit Leenstra | Antoinette de Jong | |
| 2016, Heerenveen | Jorien ter Mors | Ireen Wüst | Marrit Leenstra | |
| 2017, Heerenveen | Ireen Wüst | Jorien ter Mors | Marrit Leenstra | |
| 2018, Heerenveen | Jorien ter Mors | Ireen Wüst | Marrit Leenstra | |
| 2019, Heerenveen | Ireen Wüst | Antoinette de Jong | Melissa Wijfje | |
| 2020, Heerenveen | Melissa Wijfje | Ireen Wüst | Joy Beune | |

=== Women's 3,000 m ===
| Year and venue | Gold | Silver | Bronze | Source |
|---|---|---|---|---|
| 1987, The Hague | Yvonne van Gennip | Marieke Stam | Petra Moolhuizen | |
| 1988, Heerenveen | Yvonne van Gennip | Ingrid Paul | Ria Visser | |
| 1989, Heerenveen | Marieke Stam | Yvonne van Gennip | Hanneke de Vries | |
| 1990, Heerenveen | Hanneke de Vries | Lia van Schie | Jolanda Grimbergen | |
| 1991, Haarlem | Lia van Schie | Jolanda Grimbergen | Hanneke de Vries | |
| 1992, Heerenveen | Yvonne van Gennip | Carla Zijlstra | Lia van Schie | |
| 1993, Deventer | Carla Zijlstra | Ingrid van der Voort | Barbara de Loor | |
| 1994, Heerenveen | Carla Zijlstra | Annamarie Thomas | Barbara de Loor | |
| 1995, The Hague | Carla Zijlstra | Annamarie Thomas | Lia van Schie | |
| 1996, Groningen | Tonny de Jong | Barbara de Loor | Sandra 't Hart | |
| 1997, The Hague | Martine Oosting | Marja Vis | Roosmarie Dieleman | |
| 1998, Heerenveen | Tonny de Jong | Carla Zijlstra | Annamarie Thomas | |
| 1999, Groningen | Tonny de Jong | Carla Zijlstra | Barbara de Loor | |
| 2000, Deventer | Marja Vis | Barbara de Loor | Wieteke Cramer | |
| 2001, The Hague | Renate Groenewold | Tonny de Jong | Barbara de Loor | |
| 2002, Groningen | Tonny de Jong | Marja Vis | Frédérique Ankoné | |
| 2003, Utrecht | Barbara de Loor | Jenita Hulzebosch-Smit | Renate Groenewold | |
| 2004, Heerenveen | Renate Groenewold | Gretha Smit | Barbara de Loor | |
| 2005, Assen | Gretha Smit | Renate Groenewold | Moniek Kleinsman | |
| 2006, Heerenveen | Ireen Wüst | Renate Groenewold | Moniek Kleinsman | |
| 2007, Assen | Renate Groenewold | Ireen Wüst | Paulien van Deutekom | |
| 2008, Heerenveen | Renate Groenewold | Gretha Smit | Paulien van Deutekom | |
| 2009, Heerenveen | Renate Groenewold | Paulien van Deutekom | Lisette van der Geest | |
| 2010, Heerenveen | Ireen Wüst | Renate Groenewold | Diane Valkenburg | |
| 2011, Heerenveen | Ireen Wüst | Marrit Leenstra | Marije Joling | |
| 2012, Heerenveen | Pien Keulstra | Diane Valkenburg | Ireen Wüst | |
| 2013, Heerenveen | Diane Valkenburg | Ireen Wüst | Jorien ter Mors | |
| 2014, Heerenveen | Ireen Wüst | Jorien ter Mors | Antoinette de Jong | |
| 2015, Heerenveen | Ireen Wüst | Jorien Voorhuis | Carlijn Achtereekte | |
| 2016, Heerenveen | Ireen Wüst | Antoinette de Jong | Jorien Voorhuis | |
| 2017, Heerenveen | Ireen Wüst | Antoinette de Jong | Yvonne Nauta | |
| 2018, Heerenveen | Antoinette de Jong | Ireen Wüst | Irene Schouten | |
| 2019, Heerenveen | Antoinette de Jong | Ireen Wüst | Carlijn Achtereekte | |
| 2020, Heerenveen | Esmee Visser | Irene Schouten | Carlijn Achtereekte | |

=== Women's 5,000 m ===
| Year and venue | Gold | Silver | Bronze | Source |
|---|---|---|---|---|
| 1987, Utrecht | Yvonne van Gennip | Marieke Stam | Hanneke de Vries | |
| 1988, Heerenveen | Yvonne van Gennip | Grietje Mulder | Marieke Stam | |
| 1989, Heerenveen | Yvonne van Gennip | Marieke Stam | Hanneke de Vries | |
| 1990, Heerenveen | Hanneke de Vries | Jolanda Grimbergen | Lia van Schie | |
| 1991, Haarlem | Lia van Schie | Hanneke de Vries | Esmeralda Ossendrijver | |
| 1992, Heerenveen | Carla Zijlstra | Lia van Schie | Yvonne van Gennip | |
| 1993, Deventer | Carla Zijlstra | Tina Huisman | Barbara de Loor | |
| 1994, Heerenveen | Carla Zijlstra | Tonny de Jong | Barbara de Loor | |
| 1995, The Hague | Carla Zijlstra | Tonny de Jong | Annamarie Thomas | |
| 1996, Groningen | Tonny de Jong | Martine Oosting | Sandra 't Hart | |
| 1997, The Hague | Martine Oosting | Marja Vis | Sandra de Ronde | |
| 1998, Heerenveen | Carla Zijlstra | Tonny de Jong | Renate Groenewold | |
| 1999, Groningen | Carla Zijlstra | Renate Groenewold | Barbara de Loor | |
| 2000, Deventer | Barbara de Loor | Marja Vis | Carien Kleibeuker | |
| 2001, The Hague | Marja Vis | Renate Groenewold | Wieteke Cramer | |
| 2002, Groningen | Tonny de Jong | Martine Oosting | Marja Vis | |
| 2003, Utrecht | Jenita Hulzebosch-Smit | Barbara de Loor | Helen van Goozen | |
| 2004, Heerenveen | Gretha Smit | Jenita Hulzebosch-Smit | Renate Groenewold | |
| 2005, Assen | Jenita Hulzebosch-Smit | Gretha Smit | Moniek Kleinsman | |
| 2006, Heerenveen | Carien Kleibeuker | Renate Groenewold | Gretha Smit | |
| 2007, Assen | Gretha Smit | Tessa van Dijk | Carien Kleibeuker | |
| 2008, Heerenveen | Gretha Smit | Diane Valkenburg | Mireille Reitsma | |
| 2009, Heerenveen | Renate Groenewold | Gretha Smit | Lisette van der Geest | |
| 2010, Heerenveen | Renate Groenewold | Moniek Kleinsman | Gretha Smit | |
| 2011, Heerenveen | Moniek Kleinsman | Carlijn Achtereekte | Marije Joling | |
| 2012, Heerenveen | Pien Keulstra | Carlijn Achtereekte | Annouk van der Weijden | |
| 2013, Heerenveen | Marije Joling | Diane Valkenburg | Rixt Meijer | |
| 2014, Heerenveen | Yvonne Nauta | Carien Kleibeuker | Antoinette de Jong | |
| 2015, Heerenveen | Carien Kleibeuker | Carlijn Achtereekte | Jorien Voorhuis | |
| 2016, Heerenveen | Carien Kleibeuker | Irene Schouten | Lisa van der Geest | |
| 2017, Heerenveen | Carien Kleibeuker | Antoinette de Jong | Carlijn Achtereekte | |
| 2018, Heerenveen | Antoinette de Jong | Carien Kleibeuker | Carlijn Achtereekte | |
| 2019, Heerenveen | Esmee Visser | Carien Kleibeuker | Carlijn Achtereekte | |
| 2020, Heerenveen | Esmee Visser | Irene Schouten | Carlijn Achtereekte | |

=== Women's mass start ===
| Year and venue | Gold | Silver | Bronze | Source |
|---|---|---|---|---|
| 2013, Heerenveen | Irene Schouten | Mariska Huisman | Carla Zielman | |
| 2014, Amsterdam | Irene Schouten | Mariska Huisman | Janneke Ensing | |
| 2015, Groningen | Irene Schouten | Mariska Huisman | Manon Kamminga | |
| 2016, Heerenveen | Irene Schouten | Janneke Ensing | Annouk van der Weijden | |
| 2017, Heerenveen | Irene Schouten | Melissa Wijfje | Suzanne Schulting | |
| 2019, Heerenveen | Irene Schouten | Marijke Groenewoud | Elisa Dul | |
| 2020, Heerenveen | Irene Schouten | Marijke Groenewoud | Suzanne Schulting | |

=== Women's allround ===
| Year and venue | Gold | Silver | Bronze | Source |
|---|---|---|---|---|
| 1955, Zutphen | Rie Meijer | Ietje Louwen | Tiny Pol | |
| 1956, Zutphen | Rie Meijer | Ietje Louwen | Rie van Stijn | |
| 1959, Gorredijk | Rie Meijer | Annie Hulshof | Annemarie Wiegerink | |
| 1962, Amsterdam | Willy de Beer | Gré Broers | Riet Lokhorst | |
| 1963, Groningen | Willy de Beer | Annie van der Aa | Ietje Pfrommer-Louwen | |
| 1964, Deventer | Stien Kaiser | Wil van Wees | Willy de Beer | |
| 1965, Amsterdam | Stien Kaiser | Carry Geijssen | Ans Schut | |
| 1966, Deventer | Carry Geijssen | Willy de Beer | Stien Kaiser | |
| 1967, Amsterdam | Stien Kaiser | Carry Geijssen | Ans Schut | |
| 1968, Amsterdam | Stien Kaiser | Carry Geijssen | Ans Schut | |
| 1969, Heerenveen | Stien Kaiser | Ans Schut | Ellie van den Brom | |
| 1970, Deventer | Atje Keulen-Deelstra | Stien Kaiser | Ellie van den Brom | |
| 1971, Amsterdam | Stien Kaiser | Atje Keulen-Deelstra | Trijnie Rep | |
| 1972, Deventer | Atje Keulen-Deelstra | Stien Baas-Kaiser | Trijnie Rep | |
| 1973, Heerenveen | Atje Keulen-Deelstra | Trijnie Rep | Sippie Tigchelaar | |
| 1974, Assen | Atje Keulen-Deelstra | Sippie Tigchelaar | Sijtje van der Lende | |
| 1975, Assen | Sippie Tigchelaar | Sophie Westenbroek | Sijtje van der Lende | |
| 1976, Groningen | Sijtje van der Lende | Annie Borckink | Ina Steenbruggen | |
| 1977, Assen | Sijtje van der Lende | Haitske Pijlman | Sophie Westenbroek | |
| 1978, Eindhoven | Joke van Rijssel | Ina Steenbruggen | Sijtje van der Lende | |
| 1979, Heerenveen | Annie Borckink | Janneke Heemstra | Gerda Timmer-Volmer | |
| 1980, The Hague | Ria Visser | Annie Borckink | Sijtje van der Lende | |
| 1981, Assen | Alie Boorsma | Ina Steenbruggen | Annie Borckink | |
| 1982, Heerenveen | Alie Boorsma | Ria Visser | Thea Limbach | |
| 1983, Deventer | Ria Visser | Ina Steenbruggen | Alie Boorsma | |
| 1984, Groningen | Ria Visser | Yvonne van Gennip | Thea Limbach | |
| 1985, Alkmaar | Ria Visser | Marieke Stam | Thea Limbach | |
| 1986, Assen | Ria Visser | Marieke Stam | Petra Moolhuizen | |
| 1987, Deventer | Yvonne van Gennip | Petra Moolhuizen | Marieke Stam | |
| 1988, Alkmaar | Yvonne van Gennip | Marga Preuter | Hanneke de Vries | |
| 1989, The Hague | Henriët van der Meer | Grietje Mulder | Hanneke de Vries | |
| 1990, Assen | Herma Meijer | Lia van Schie | Henriët van der Meer | |
| 1991, Alkmaar | Jolanda Grimbergen | Sandra Zwolle | Carla Zijlstra | |
| 1992, Alkmaar | Lia van Schie | Carla Zijlstra | Hanneke de Vries | |
| 1993, Assen | Carla Zijlstra | Barbara de Loor | Annamarie Thomas | |
| 1994, The Hague | Annamarie Thomas | Barbara de Loor | Carla Zijlstra | |
| 1995, Assen | Annamarie Thomas | Tonny de Jong | Carla Zijlstra | |
| 1996, The Hague | Annamarie Thomas | Tonny de Jong | Carla Zijlstra | |
| 1997, Assen | Tonny de Jong | Carla Zijlstra | Barbara de Loor | |
| 1998, Deventer | Tonny de Jong | Barbara de Loor | Sandra Zwolle | |
| 1999, The Hague | Sandra 't Hart | Helen van Goozen | Irene Visser | |
| 2000, The Hague | Renate Groenewold | Tonny de Jong | Annamarie Thomas | |
| 2001, Heerenveen | Tonny de Jong | Renate Groenewold | Barbara de Loor | |
| 2002, Alkmaar | Marja Vis | Wieteke Cramer | Sandra 't Hart | |
| 2003, Assen | Renate Groenewold | Annamarie Thomas | Marja Vis | |
| 2004, Eindhoven | Renate Groenewold | Gretha Smit | Wieteke Cramer | |
| 2005, Heerenveen | Moniek Kleinsman | Renate Groenewold | Ireen Wüst | |
| 2006, Utrecht | Wieteke Cramer | Tessa van Dijk | Jorien Voorhuis | |
| 2007, Heerenveen | Ireen Wüst | Renate Groenewold | Marja Vis | |
| 2008, Groningen | Ireen Wüst | Renate Groenewold | Paulien van Deutekom | |
| 2009, Heerenveen | Ireen Wüst | Elma de Vries | Paulien van Deutekom | |
| 2010, Heerenveen | Elma de Vries | Jorien Voorhuis | Marrit Leenstra | |
| 2011, Heerenveen | Marrit Leenstra | Jorien Voorhuis | Diane Valkenburg | |
| 2012, Heerenveen | Marrit Leenstra | Linda de Vries | Jorien Voorhuis | |
| 2013, Heerenveen | Jorien ter Mors | Ireen Wüst | Diane Valkenburg | |
| 2014, Amsterdam | Yvonne Nauta | Diane Valkenburg | Irene Schouten | |
| 2015, Heerenveen | Ireen Wüst | Jorien Voorhuis | Linda de Vries | |
| 2016, Heerenveen | Antoinette de Jong | Annouk van der Weijden | Linda de Vries | |
| 2017, Heerenveen | Marije Joling | Yvonne Nauta | Carlijn Achtereekte | |
| 2018, Heerenveen | Annouk van der Weijden | Linda de Vries | Melissa Wijfje | |
| 2019, Heerenveen | Carlijn Achtereekte | Joy Beune | Esmee Visser | |
| 2020, Heerenveen | Antoinette de Jong | Melissa Wijfje | Carlijn Achtereekte | |

== Medal rankings ==
=== Athlete rankings by discipline ===
==== Men's allround ====
| Place | Athlete | Years | Gold | Silver | Bronze | Total |
|---|---|---|---|---|---|---|
| 1. | Hilbert van der Duim | 1978–1985 | 7 | 1 | – | 8 |
| 2. | Sven Kramer | 2005–2015 | 6 | – | – | 6 |
| 3. | Kees Verkerk | 1965–1972 | 4 | – | 1 | 5 |
| 4. | Ard Schenk | 1964–1971 | 3 | 4 | 1 | 8 |
| 5. | Jan Blokhuijsen | 2011–2020 | 3 | 1 | 1 | 5 |
| 6. | Falko Zandstra | 1992–1997 | 3 | 1 | – | 4 |
| 7. | Gianni Romme | 1997–2003 | 3 | – | 1 | 4 |
| 7. | Leo Visser | 1987–1991 | 3 | – | 1 | 4 |
| 9. | Coen de Koning | 1903–1912 | 3 | – | – | 3 |
| 10. | Rintje Ritsma | 1992–2006 | 2 | 4 | 3 | 9 |

==== Men's sprint allround ====
| Place | Athlete | Years | Gold | Silver | Bronze | Total |
|---|---|---|---|---|---|---|
| 1. | Gerard van Velde | 1992–2006 | 6 | 4 | 1 | 11 |
| 2. | Jan Bos | 1996–2011 | 6 | 3 | 2 | 11 |
| 3. | Stefan Groothuis | 2006–2013 | 6 | – | – | 6 |
| 4. | Jan Bazen | 1969–1976 | 3 | 3 | 2 | 8 |
| 5. | Erben Wennemars | 1997–2009 | 3 | 2 | 3 | 8 |
| 6. | Jos Valentijn | 1970–1978 | 3 | 2 | 1 | 6 |
| 7. | Jan Ykema | 1982–1989 | 3 | 1 | 1 | 3 |
| 8. | Hein Vergeer | 1983–1988 | 2 | 2 | 1 | 5 |
| 9. | Arie Loef | 1988–1994 | 2 | 2 | – | 4 |
| 10. | Miel Govaert | 1978–1982 | 2 | 1 | – | 3 |

==== Men's distance races ====
| Place | Athlete | Years | Gold | Silver | Bronze | Total |
|---|---|---|---|---|---|---|
| 1. | Sven Kramer | 2006–2020 | 20 | 5 | 6 | 31 |
| 2. | Gerard van Velde | 1991–2005 | 12 | 3 | 4 | 19 |
| 3. | Erben Wennemars | 1997–2009 | 11 | 11 | 9 | 31 |
| 4. | Rintje Ritsma | 1992–2002 | 11 | 4 | 3 | 18 |
| 5. | Jan Bos | 1996–2011 | 10 | 8 | 6 | 24 |
| 6. | Bob de Jong | 1995–2015 | 8 | 11 | 12 | 31 |
| 7. | Kjeld Nuis | 2012–2019 | 8 | 5 | 1 | 14 |
| 8. | Jorrit Bergsma | 2011–2020 | 7 | 8 | 4 | 19 |
| 9. | Jan Smeekens | 2007–2020 | 6 | 5 | 2 | 13 |
| 10. | Gianni Romme | 1996–2005 | 6 | 3 | 1 | 10 |

==== Women's allround ====
| Place | Athlete | Years | Gold | Silver | Bronze | Total |
|---|---|---|---|---|---|---|
| 1. | Stien Kaiser | 1964–1972 | 6 | 2 | 1 | 9 |
| 2. | Ria Visser | 1979–1986 | 5 | 2 | – | 7 |
| 3. | Ireen Wüst | 2005–2015 | 4 | 1 | 1 | 6 |
| 4. | Atje Keulen-Deelstra | 1970–1974 | 4 | 1 | – | 5 |
| 5. | Renate Groenewold | 2000–2008 | 3 | 4 | – | 7 |
| 6. | Tonny de Jong | 1995–2001 | 3 | 3 | – | 6 |
| 7. | Annamarie Thomas | 1993–2003 | 3 | 1 | 2 | 6 |
| 8. | Sijtje van der Lende | 1974–1980 | 3 | – | 4 | 7 |
| 9. | Rie Meyer | 1955–1959 | 3 | – | – | 3 |
| 10. | Willy de Beer | 1962–1966 | 2 | 1 | 1 | 4 |

==== Women's sprint allround ====
| Place | Athlete | Years | Gold | Silver | Bronze | Total |
|---|---|---|---|---|---|---|
| 1. | Marianne Timmer | 1997–2008 | 10 | 1 | – | 11 |
| 2. | Christine Aaftink | 1987–1996 | 7 | 2 | 1 | 10 |
| 3. | Margot Boer | 2007–2016 | 4 | 2 | 4 | 10 |
| 4. | Andrea Nuyt | 1996–2004 | 2 | 3 | 2 | 7 |
| 5. | Annamarie Thomas | 1995–2004 | 2 | 3 | 1 | 6 |
| 6. | Yvonne van Gennip | 1983–1986 | 2 | 2 | – | 4 |
| 7. | Letitia de Jong | 2018–2020 | 2 | 1 | – | 3 |
| 8. | Annette Gerritsen | 2005–2011 | 1 | 2 | 2 | 5 |
| 9. | Alie Boorsma | 1983–1985 | 1 | 1 | 1 | 3 |
| 9. | Marrit Leenstra | 2012–2016 | 1 | 1 | 1 | 3 |
| 9. | Thijsje Oenema | 2012–2015 | 1 | 1 | 1 | 3 |

==== Women's distance races ====
| Place | Athlete | Years | Gold | Silver | Bronze | Total |
|---|---|---|---|---|---|---|
| 1. | Ireen Wüst | 2006–2020 | 18 | 12 | 8 | 38 |
| 2. | Christine Aaftink | 1987–1996 | 12 | 4 | 3 | 19 |
| 3. | Marianne Timmer | 1994–2010 | 11 | 13 | 7 | 31 |
| 4. | Renate Groenewold | 1995–2010 | 10 | 10 | 5 | 25 |
| 5. | Yvonne van Gennip | 1987–1992 | 9 | 4 | 1 | 14 |
| 5. | Carla Zijlstra | 1992–1999 | 9 | 4 | 1 | 14 |
| 7. | Jorien ter Mors | 2013–2018 | 8 | 2 | 1 | 11 |
| 8. | Tonny de Jong | 1994–2002 | 7 | 9 | 2 | 18 |
| 9. | Irene Schouten | 2013–2020 | 7 | 3 | 1 | 11 |
| 10. | Andrea Nuyt | 1996–2004 | 6 | 3 | 5 | 14 |
