= Netherlands at the 1992 Winter Olympics =

- Flag of the Netherlands
- IOC code: NED
- NOC: Dutch Olympic Committee

in Albertville
- Competitors: 19 (9 men, 10 women) in 2 sports
- Flag bearer: Leo Visser (speed skating)
- Medals Ranked 12th: Gold 1 Silver 1 Bronze 2 Total 4

Winter Olympics appearances (overview)
- 1928; 1932; 1936; 1948; 1952; 1956; 1960; 1964; 1968; 1972; 1976; 1980; 1984; 1988; 1992; 1994; 1998; 2002; 2006; 2010; 2014; 2018; 2022; 2026

The Netherlands was represented at the 1992 Winter Olympics in Albertville, France by the Dutch Olympic Committee*Dutch Sports Federation.

In total, 19 athletes including nine men and 10 woman represented the Netherlands in two different sports including short track speed skating and speed skating.

The Netherlands won four medals at the games, all in speed skating, after Bart Veldkamp won gold in the men's 10,000 m, Falko Zandstra won silver in the men's 5,000 m and Leo Visser won bronze in both the men's 5,000 m and the men's 1,500 m.

== Competitors ==
In total, 19 athletes represented the Netherlands at the 1992 Winter Olympics in Albertville, France across two different sports.

Sport	Men	Women	Total
Short track speed skating	1	4	5
Speed skating	8	6	14
Total	9	10	19

== Medalists ==
The Netherlands won a total of four medals at the games including one gold, two silver and two bronze.

Medal	Name	Sport	Event	Date
Gold	Bart Veldkamp	Speed skating	Men's 10,000 metres	20 February
Silver	Falko Zandstra	Speed skating	Men's 5,000 metres	13 February
Bronze	Leo Visser	Speed skating	Men's 5,000 metres	13 February
Bronze	Leo Visser	Speed skating	Men's 1,500 metres	16 February

== Short track speed skating ==
In total, five Dutch athletes participated in the Short track speed skating events – Priscilla Ernst, Joëlle van Koetsveld van Ankeren, Mark Velzeboer, Monique Velzeboer and Simone Velzeboer.

The short track speed skating events took place at La Halle de Glace Olympique in Albertville, France from 18 to 22 February 1992.

Men

Event	Athlete	Heat		Quarterfinal		Semifinal		Final	
Event	Athlete	Time	Position	Time	Position	Time	Position	Time	Position
1000 m	Mark Velzeboer	1:38.74	2 Q	1:33.86	3	Did not advance			

Women

Event	Athlete	Heat		Quarterfinal		Semifinal		Final	
Event	Athlete	Time	Position	Time	Position	Time	Position	Time	Position
500 m	Joëlle van Koetsveld van Ankeren	1:00.29	2 Q	1:07.23	3	Did not advance			
500 m	Monique Velzeboer	48.09	1 Q	53:46	2 Q	47:52	2 Q	47.28	4
500 m	Simone Velzeboer	55:43	4	Did not advance					
3000 m relay	Monique Velzeboer; Simone Velzeboer; Joëlle van Koetsveld van Ankeren; Priscilla Ernst					4:47.21	3	Did not advance	

== Speed skating ==
In total, 14 Dutch athletes participated in the speed skating events – Christine Aaftink, Thomas Bos, Yvonne van Gennip, Arie Loef, Rintje Ritsma, Herma Meijer, Lia van Schie, Gerard van Velde, Bart Veldkamp, Leo Visser, Sandra Voetelink, Robert Vunderink, Falko Zandstra and Carla Zijlstra.

The speed skating events took place at L'Anneau de Vitesse in Albertville, France from 9 to 20 February 1992.

Men

Event	Athlete	Race	
Event	Athlete	Time	Rank
500 m	Arie Loef	38.61	29
500 m	Rintje Ritsma	38.51	27
500 m	Gerard van Velde	37.49	5
1000 m	Arie Loef	1:16.18	14
1000 m	Rintje Ritsma	1:15.96	12
1000 m	Gerard van Velde	1:14.93	4
1000 m	Falko Zandstra	1:15.57	10
1500 m	Rintje Ritsma	1:55.70	4
1500 m	Bart Veldkamp	1:56.33	5
1500 m	Leo Visser	1:54.90	3rd place, bronze medalist(s)
1500 m	Falko Zandstra	1:56.96	7
5000 m	Bart Veldkamp	7:08.00	5
5000 m	Leo Visser	7:04.96	3rd place, bronze medalist(s)
5000 m	Falko Zandstra	7:02.28	2nd place, silver medalist(s)
10,000 m	Thomas Bos	14:40.13	11
10,000 m	Bart Veldkamp	14:12.12	1st place, gold medalist(s)
10,000 m	Robert Vunderink	14:22.92	4

Women

Event	Athlete	Race	
Event	Athlete	Time	Rank
500 m	Christine Aaftink	40.66	5
500 m	Herma Meijer	41.31	11
500 m	Sandra Voetelink	DNF	–
1000 m	Christine Aaftink	1:22.60	4
1000 m	Herma Meijer	1:23.50	12
1000 m	Sandra Voetelink	1:24.21	16
1500 m	Yvonne van Gennip	DNF	–
1500 m	Lia van Schie	2:09.70	16
1500 m	Sandra Voetelink	2:10.31	18
1500 m	Carla Zijlstra	2:08.54	9
3000 m	Yvonne van Gennip	4:28.10	6
3000 m	Lia van Schie	4:30.57	9
3000 m	Carla Zijlstra	4:27.18	4
5000 m	Lia van Schie	7:46.94	8
5000 m	Carla Zijlstra	7:41.10	4
