= National championship =

Competition at national level

A national championship(s) is the top achievement for any sport or contest within a league of a particular nation or country. The title is usually awarded by contests, ranking systems, stature, ability, etc. This determines the best team, individual (or other entity) in a particular nation and in a particular field. Often, the use of the term cup or championship is just a choice of words.

== Bandy ==
- (Finland) List of Finnish bandy champions
- (Norway) List of Norwegian bandy champions
- (Russia) List of Russian bandy champions
- (Sweden) List of Swedish bandy champions
- List of United States bandy champions

== Basketball ==
- (United States) (Canada) NBA Finals
- (United States) NCAA Division I men's basketball tournament
- (United States) NCAA Division I women's basketball tournament
- (Iceland) Úrvalsdeild karla
- (Iceland) Úrvalsdeild kvenna

== Bridge ==
- (United States) (Canada) North American Bridge Championships

== Boxing ==
- England Boxing National Amateur Championships
- United States national amateur boxing championships
- (United States) Golden Gloves

== Curling ==
=== Men's ===
- (Canada) Tim Hortons Brier
- United States Curling Men's Championships
- (Scotland) Bruadar Scottish Men's Championship
- (France) French national men's curling championship
- (Russia) Russian Men's Curling Championship
- (Italy) Italian Curling Championship

=== Women's ===
- (Canada) Scotties Tournament of Hearts
- United States Curling Women's Championships
- (Scotland) Columba Cream Scottish Women's Championship
- (France) French national women's curling championship
- (Italy) Italian Curling Championship

== American football ==
- (United States) Super Bowl
- (United States) College football national championships in NCAA Division I FBS
  - (United States) College Football Playoff (2014–present)
  - (United States) Bowl Championship Series (1998–2013)
  - (United States) Bowl Alliance (1995–1997)
  - (United States) Bowl Coalition (1992–1994)
  - (United States) Mythical national championship (term used more commonly before BCS and CFP)
- (United States) NCAA Division I Football Championship
- (United States) Black college football national championship
- (United States) High School Football National Championship
- (Republic of Ireland) (Northern Ireland) Irish American Football League
- (Republic of Ireland) (Northern Ireland) Shamrock Bowl

== Sailing ==
- (United States) (Canada) Intercollegiate Sailing Association National Championships

== Rowing ==
- (United States) USRowing National Championships
- (United States) Intercollegiate Rowing Association National Championships (college men and lightweight men and women)
- (United States) NCAA Division I Rowing Championship (college openweight women)
- (United Kingdom) British Rowing Championships
- (Australia) Australian Rowing Championships

== Speed skating ==
- (Netherlands) KNSB Dutch Speed Skating Championships

== Swimming ==
- United States Swimming National Championships
- United States Short Course Swimming Championships
- (South Africa) Telkom SA National Aquatic Championships
- (Australia) Australian Swimming Championships
- (United Kingdom) British Swimming Championships
- (Lithuania) Lithuanian Swimming Championships
- (Sweden) Swedish Swimming Championships
- (Sweden) Swedish Short Course Swimming Championships

== Volleyball ==
- (United States) NCAA Men's Volleyball Championship

== Wrestling ==
- (Canada) U Sports Wrestling Championships
- Wrestling Canada Lutte Canadian Wrestling Championships
- Pahlevan of Iran
- (Russia) Russian National Championships
- (United States) NCAA Division I Wrestling Championships, Division II Wrestling Championships, Division III Wrestling Championships, NAIA Wrestling Championship, NCWA Championships
