= Dutch Speed Skating Championships =

The Dutch Championships are organised by the Royal Dutch Speed Skating Association (KNSB).

In 1887 the first Dutch open championships took place in Slikkerveer. The men skated one distance, the Dutch mile. In the final the Englishmen Charles Tebbit the Dutch skater Willem-Jan van Vollenhoven (the great-grandfather of Pieter van Vollenhoven. The first official Dutch Allround championships took place in 1901 in Leeuwarden. The champion became Eeko Banning.

The Dutch Allround Championships for women has been organised since 1955, when only 3 distances were skated.

Since 1969 there is also organised a Dutch Sprint championship and since 1987 also a Dutch Single Distance championship.

== Championships ==
- KNSB Dutch Allround Championships
- KNSB Dutch Sprint Championships
- KNSB Dutch Single Distance Championships
- KNSB Dutch Super Sprint Championships
- Dutch National Kortebaan Speed Skating Championships

== Other Championships ==
- KNSB Dutch Marathon Championships Natural ice
- KNSB Dutch Marathon Championships Artificial ice
- KNSB Dutch Short Track Championships

== See also ==
- List of the Dutch Speed Skating Championships medalists
