= Jelmer Beulenkamp =

Dutch speed skater

Personal information
- Born: 16 November 1977 (age 48) Utrecht

Sport
- Country: Netherlands
- Sport: Speed skating

Jelmer Beulenkamp (born 16 November 1977) is a former speed skater. He was the Dutch speed skating champion in 1998. In 2003, he switched to marathon skating.

In his speed skating career Beulenkamp skated one world record.

== World record ==
Event	Time	Date	Venue
3000 m	3:52.67	25 February 1998	(Netherlands) Heerenveen

Source: SpeedSkatingStats.com
