= Marieke Wijsman =

Dutch speed skater

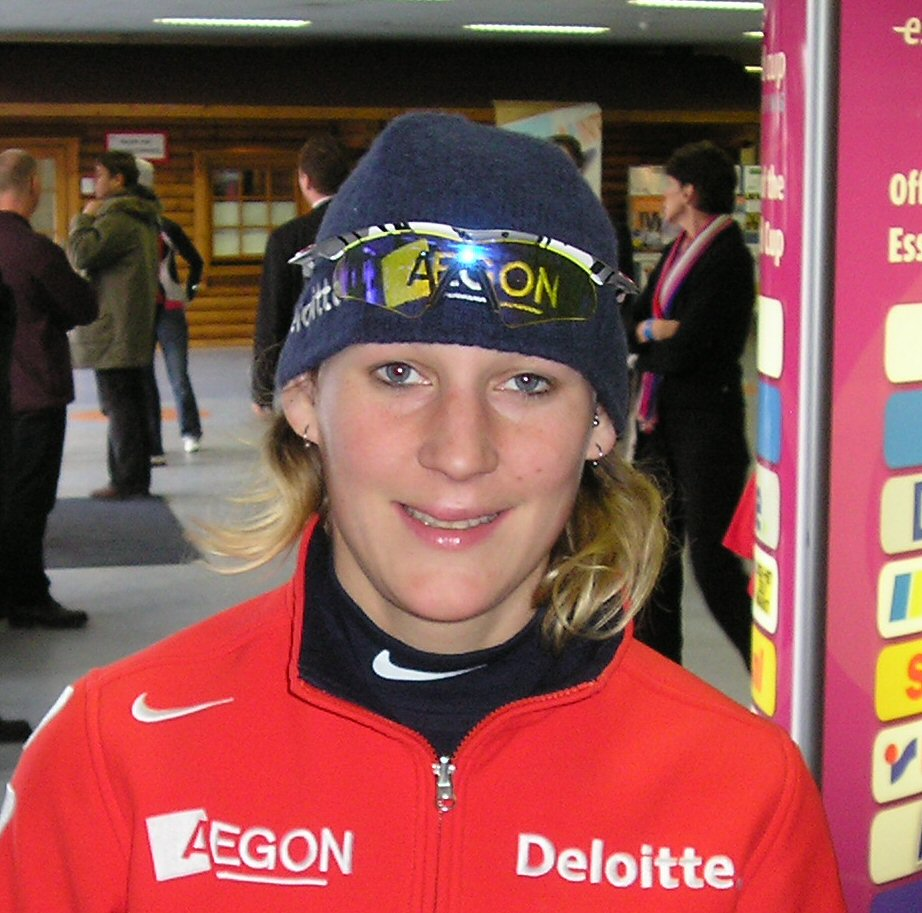
- Marieke Wijsman

Personal information
- Born: 9 May 1975 (age 51) Leusden, Netherlands

Sport
- Country: Netherlands
- Sport: Speed skating
- Retired: 2006

Anne Marie Louise (Marieke) Wijsman (born 9 May 1975) is a Dutch former speed skater who represented her country in two Winter Olympics, and who was the first female speed skater to compete internationally on clap skates.

== Early years ==
Wijsman was born in Leusden, near Utrecht, Netherlands, and became a member of a local speed skating club in Ankeveen during the 1988–89 season. She first competed at the age of thirteen at the Jaap Edenbaan in Amsterdam, where she fell in the 500m race due to nervousness. In the second 500m race she recovered and finished in 1:07.1, while she skated in her first competitive 1000m race that same weekend, finishing with a time of 2:44.0. In her first-ever competitive races as part of a team, she skated 53.10 in the 500m and 2:53.80 in the 1500m. In following years, she improved steadily as her training capabilities gradually increased.

In 1992, Wijsman participated in a Dutch national championship for the first time, at the Supersprint Championships in Groningen, where she finished in 17th place. In 1994, she was placed 8th in the Dutch national junior A allround championships, thus earning a spot on the regional district team. In December 1995, while on this district team, she took part in her first international race, in Hamar, where the skating components of the 1994 Winter Olympics had been held. At the 1996 KNSB Dutch Single Distance Championships in Groningen, Wijsman won the title of Dutch national 1500m champion.

== National team ==
Wijsman's early success led her to be promoted onto the national team, which at the time was headed by Eddy Verheijen. She qualified for World Cup meetings in South Korea and Japan, and became the first female skater to compete in international races on clap skates. Her international win took place on 11 January 1997 in Milwaukee in the 1000 m of the B-Group. Later, in 1997, she was promoted again, this time into the Kernploeg, which is the most renowned team managed by the KNSB, which at the time was headed by Peter Mueller.

== 1998 Olympics - 2000 ==
She has taken part in several World Cups, winning two B-Group races over 1000 and 1500m in Baselga di Pine and Innsbruck; World Sprint Championships in Hamar, where she came in 20th place; and also qualified for the 1998 Winter Olympics in Nagano. In Nagano she finished 24th in the 500m and 20th in the 1000m. Later that year she took part in the World Single Distance Championships over 1500m, in Calgary, where she finished in 13th place. The following year she finished in 6th place in the World Cup standings and 9th at the World Single Distance Championships, both over 1500m. She qualified for the 2000 European and World Allround Championships, finishing in 11th and 14th position respectively. In February 2000, she won a bronze medal at the Dutch Sprint Championships in Utrecht, and also finished 18th at the Sprint World Championships in Seoul.

== 2001 - 2006 ==
In January 2001, she won another World Cup race in the B-Group, this time a 1000m race in Helsinki. A month later she had a hard fall and suffered a skull fracture. Though she recovered, she was not selected for any of the Kernploeg teams. She trained on Marianne Timmer's professional team for a while, but as this team did not last long, she was shortly on her own again. However, in that period she won another B-Group World Cup 500m race in Heerenveen, won another bronze medal at the Dutch National Sprint Championships, finished 11th in the World Sprint Championships, and qualified for the 2002 Winter Olympics, her second Olympics, which was held in Salt Lake City. There she finished 18th in both the 500m and the 1000m. Following the 2002 Olympics and with help from Tjalling van den Bosch, she was sponsored to start her own professional team. During the summer of 2002 she trained with Peter Mueller again, but when Van den Bosch became a fitness coach with the American national speed skating team, she moved with him to Salt Lake City to prepare for the 2004 season and the 2006 Winter Olympics. This training resulted in Wijsman winning a silver medal in the 2003 Dutch Sprint Championships. At the 2003 World Sprint Championships she only placed 23rd, but at the 2003 World Single Distance Championships she was 12th in the 500m and 13th in the 1000m.

Though Wijsman had a good relationship with Van den Bosch, they decided to go separate ways at the end of the 2004–05 season, after Wijsman finished 23rd at the World Sprint Championships. In June 2005, she began to train with the KNSB regional top team again, on which she participated in several World Cup meets and the World Sprint Championships in Heerenveen, where she placed 16th. She won a B-Group race over 1000m in Milwaukee, but was unable to qualify for the 2006 Winter Olympics. In the summer of 2006, she applied for a job with the police and was hired. A contract was signed between the police station and the KNSB making sure that Wijsman was still able to compete in speed skating while learning to become a general police officer. Together with Frouke Oonk, she then joined the team of Chris Witty, who quit her international career after the 2006 Olympics to begin training her own team.

Wijsman's last notable result was a B-Group World Cup win over 500m in Heerenveen, which took place on 11 November 2006.

== Retirement ==
In late December 2006, Marieke Wijsman ended her international career as a speed skater in order to devote herself to working as a police officer.

Wijsman is openly lesbian.
