= Jan Ykema =

Dutch speed skater

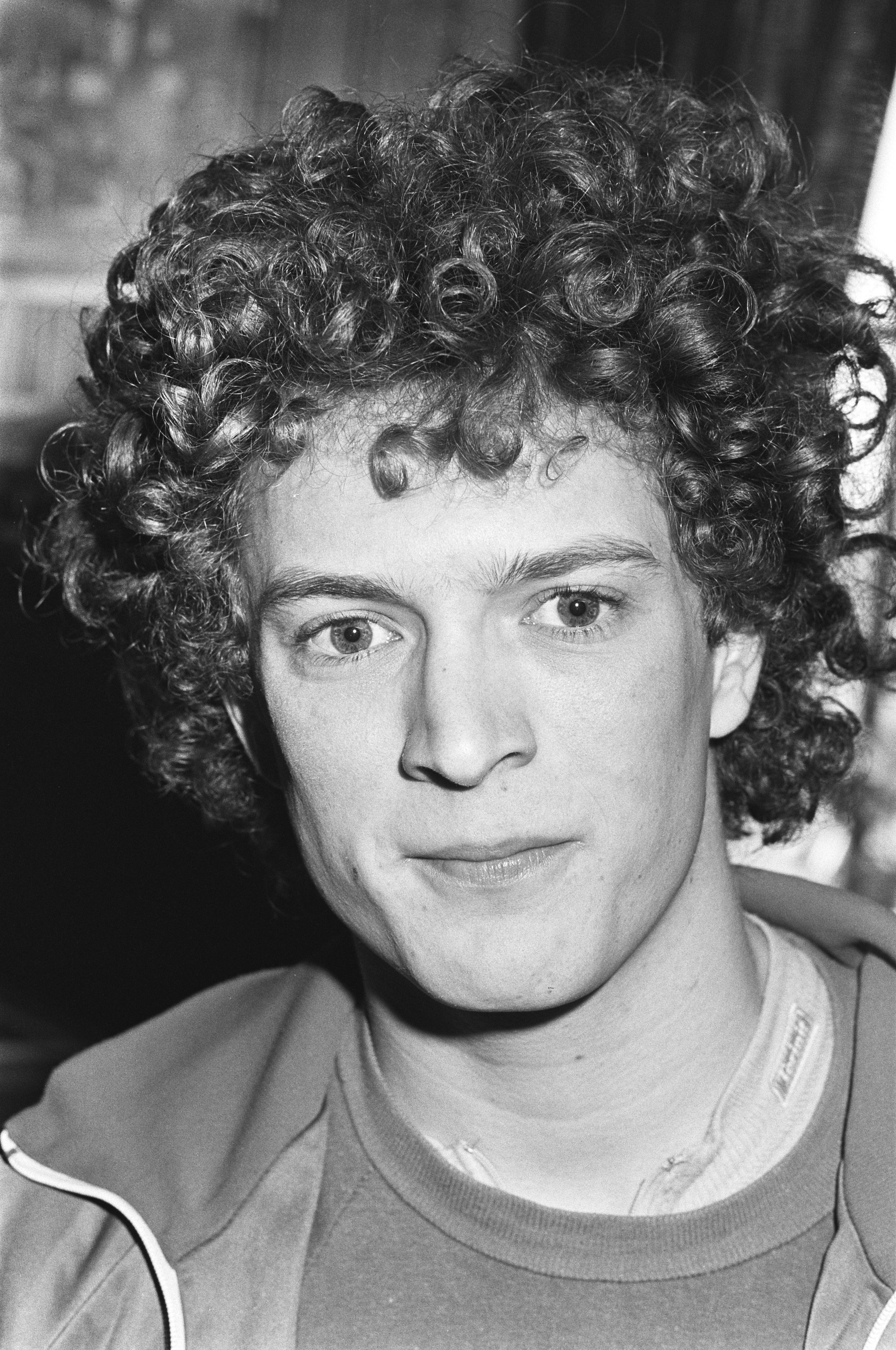
- Jan Ykema in 1982

Personal information
- Born: 18 April 1963 (age 63) Harlingen, Netherlands
- Height: 1.81 m (5 ft 11 in)
- Weight: 79 kg (174 lb)

Sport
- Country: Netherlands
- Sport: Speed skating

Achievements and titles
- Personal best(s): 1984 Winter Olympics; 1988 Winter Olympics
Medal record
Men's speed skating
Representing Netherlands
Olympic Games
Silver medal – second place	1988 Calgary	500 metres

Jan Jelte Ykema (born 18 April 1963) is a former ice speed skater from the Netherlands, who represented his native country at two consecutive Winter Olympics, starting in 1984 in Sarajevo, Yugoslavia. In 1988 (Calgary) he won the silver medal in the men's 500 metres. The same year he won all of his three World Cup races. A year later Ykema retired from international competition to work in real estate business. During his career he won three national sprint titles (1982, 1987 and 1988) and three distance titles.

After retiring from skating, Ykema became addicted to cocaine, and this addiction lasted for about 15 years. After he recovered he started giving lessons at secondary schools about his addiction. Source :

In 2008 he returned to competitive speed skating as assistant coach for the APPM team.

== Records ==
=== Personal records ===
Personal records
Men's Speed skating
Event	Result	Date	Location	Notes
500 meter	36.76	14 February 1988	Calgary	
1000 meter	1:14.24	6 December 1987	Calgary	
1500 meter	1:59.11	20 March 1988	Heerenveen	
3000 meter	4:40.92	10 December 1979	Alkmaar	
5000 meter	8:23.10	18 November 1979	Groningen	
10000 meter	16:27.30	20 February 1982	Inzell	

=== World records ===
Nr.	Event	Result	Date	Location	Notes
1.	1000 meter (juniors)	1:17.78	30 January 1981	Davos	Junior world record until 31 January 1981
2.	500 meter (juniors)	38.42	31 January 1981	Davos	Junior world record until 23 January 1982
3.	1000 meter (juniors)	1:17.49	31 January 1981	Davos	Junior world record until 23 March 1983
4.	Sprint combination (juniors)	155.935	31 January 1981	Davos	Junior world record until 11 March 1984

== Tournament overview ==
Season	Dutch Championships Single Distances	Dutch Championships Sprint	Olympic Games	World Championships Sprint
1980–81		ASSEN 4th 500m 6th 1000m 8th 500m 7th 1000m 5th overall		GRENOBLE 23rd 500m 26th 1000m 23rd 500m 22nd 1000m 20th overall
1981–82		HEERENVEEN (gold) 500m (silver) 1000m (gold) 500m (bronze) 1000m (gold) overall		ALKMAAR 30th 500m 5th 1000m 8th 500m 13th 1000m 28th overall
1982–83		UTRECHT 6th 500m (bronze) 1000m 5th 500m 8th 1000m 6th overall		
1983–84		EINDHOVEN (bronze) 500m 5th 1000m 6th 500m 14th 1000m 5th overall	SARAJEVO 14th 500m 20th 1000m	TRONDHEIM 12th 500m 20th 1000m 25th 500m 17th 1000m 18th overall
1984–85		UTRECHT (silver) 500m (bronze) 1000m (gold) 500m 21st 1000m 12th overall		
1985–86		UTRECHT (bronze) 500m 4th 1000m (silver) 500m (bronze) overall		KARUIZAWA 12th 500m 8th 1000m 9th 500m 32nd 1000m 31st overall
1986–87	THE HAGUE UTRECHT 4th 500m 22nd 1000m	DEVENTER (gold) 500m (gold) 1000m (gold) 500m (gold) 1000m (gold) overall		QUEBEC CITY 18th 500m 22nd 1000m 10th 500m 25th 1000m 18th overall
1987–88	HEERENVEEN (silver) 500m (gold) 1000m	ALKMAAR (gold) 500m (silver) 1000m (gold) 500m (gold) 1000m (gold) overall	CALGARY (silver) 500m DNS 1000m	WEST ALLIS 10th 500m (silver) 1000m 7th 500m 8th 1000m 6th overall
1988–89	HEERENVEEN (gold) 500m (gold) 1000m	HEERENVEEN (silver) 500m (bronze) 1000m (gold) 500m (silver) 1000m (silver) overall		HEERENVEEN 16th 500m 10th 1000m 15th 500m 5th1000m 12th overall

Olympic Games
Preceded by Hilbert van der Duim	Flagbearer for Netherlands; Calgary 1988	Succeeded by Leo Visser
