= Marten Hoekstra =

American business executive (born 1961)

- Born: May 21, 1961 (age 65)
- Education: University of North Dakota; Northwestern University, Kellogg School
- Occupation: Financial Services Businessperson

Marten Hoekstra (born May 21, 1961) is an American business executive in the financial industry.

== Business career ==
Marten Hoekstra’s career at UBS AG and PaineWebber, which began in 1982 as a financial advisor trainee, included executive leadership roles in the United States and Switzerland. In July 2005, five years after PaineWebber was acquired by UBS, Hoekstra was named Head of the Wealth Management business in the US. He was subsequently appointed CEO of Wealth Management Americas (WMA) with oversight for approximately $700 billion in client assets and 18,000 employees as well as Deputy CEO of Global Wealth Management & Business Banking. Hoekstra was a member of UBS AG's Group Executive Board.

Subsequently, Marten became CEO of Emerging Global Advisors, a start-up ETF firm specializing in Emerging Market equities which sold in 2016 to Columbia Threadneedle, the asset management arm of Ameriprise. Hoekstra is Senior Advisor to organizations involved in financial services in North America, Europe and China including public and private companies.

== Education & Affiliations ==
Hoekstra previously served as a Director of the Securities Industry and Financial Markets Association (SIFMA). He graduated from the University of North Dakota with a bachelor's degree in Political Science and earned a Masters in Business Administration from Kellogg Graduate School of Management at Northwestern University.

== Civic Activities ==
Hoekstra serves on the board of Prison Fellowship Ministries and the Zurich International School Foundation, and the University of North Dakota Alumni Association and Foundation where he is the Chair of the Investment Committee.
