= Nico van der Vlies =

Dutch speed skater

Personal information
- Nationality: Dutch
- Born: 11 October 1972 (age 52); Zijpe, Netherlands

Sport
- Sport: Speed skating

Nico van der Vlies (born 11 October 1972) is a Dutch former speed skater. He competed in two events at the 1994 Winter Olympics.
