= Menno Boelsma =

Dutch speed skater (1961–2022)

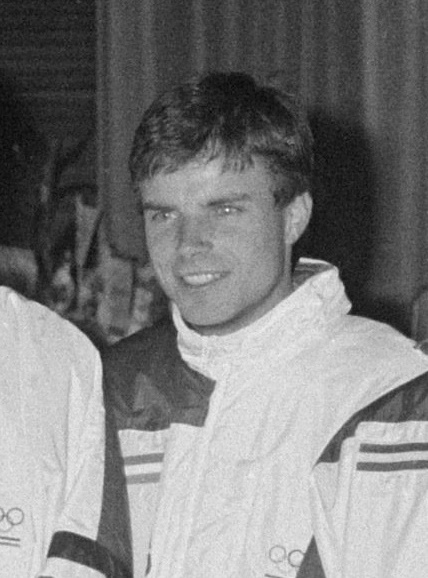
- Boelsma in 1988

Personal information
- Born: 8 January 1961 Monster, Netherlands
- Died: 10 September 2022 (aged 61)

Sport
- Sport: Speed skating and short track speed skating
- Club: Delftse Kunstijsbaan Vereniging (DKIJV)

Menno Boelsma (8 January 1961 – 10 September 2022) was a Dutch speed skater. He competed at the 1988 Winter Olympics in the 500 m and 1000 m events and finished in 16th and 24th place, respectively.

Boelsma achieved his best results in the 500 m, winning a national title in 1986 and a silver medal at the World Cup in Davos in 1990.

Personal bests:

- 500 m – 37.40 (1988)
- 1000 m – 1:15.33 (1988)
- 1500 m – 1:59.41 (1988)
- 5000 m – 7:47.2 (1984)

Boelsma died of cancer on 10 September 2022, at the age of 61.
