= Herbert Dijkstra =

Dutch speed skater

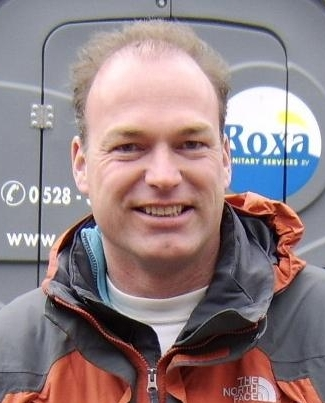

Personal information
- Nationality: Dutch
- Born: 13 July 1966 (age 58); Smilde, Netherlands

Sport
- Sport: Speed skating

Herbert Dijkstra (born 13 July 1966) is a Dutch speed skater and sports commentator. He competed in two events at the 1988 Winter Olympics.
