= Ingrid Paul =

Dutch speed skater

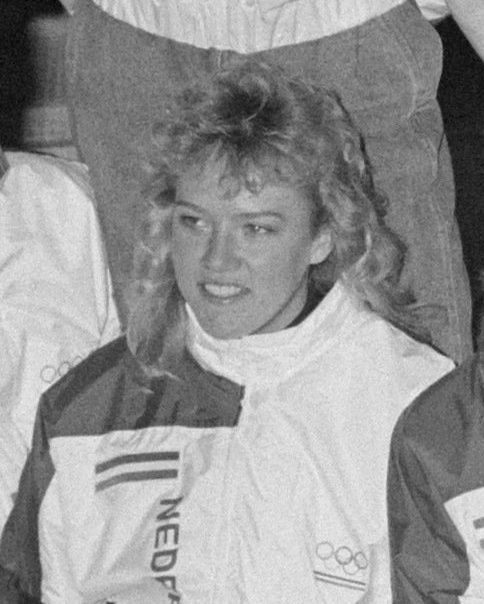
- Ingrid Paul in 1988

Personal information
- Born: 14 December 1964 (age 61) Gouda, the Netherlands
- Height: 1.71 m (5 ft 7 1/2 in)
- Weight: 62 kg (137 lb)

Sport
- Sport: Speed skating

Dirkina Wilhelmina "Ingrid" Paul (born 14 December 1964) is a retired speed skater and speed skating coach from the Netherlands. She competed at the 1988 Winter Olympics in the 3000 m and 5000 m and finished in 14th place in the latter event.

== Biography ==
=== Skating ===
In 1986, Paul won the Dutch Marathon Skating Championships. In 1988, she competed in two events in the Calgary Olympics. On the 3000 meters she was disqualified because of an error when crossing lanes with her opponent. On the 5000 meters she finished in 14th place.

Personal bests:

- 500 m – 43.0 (1988)
- 1000 m – 1:24.78 (1989)
- 1500 m – 2:08.44 (1988)
- 3000 m – 4:27.25 (1989)
- 5000 m – 7:38.25 (1988)

=== Skating coach ===
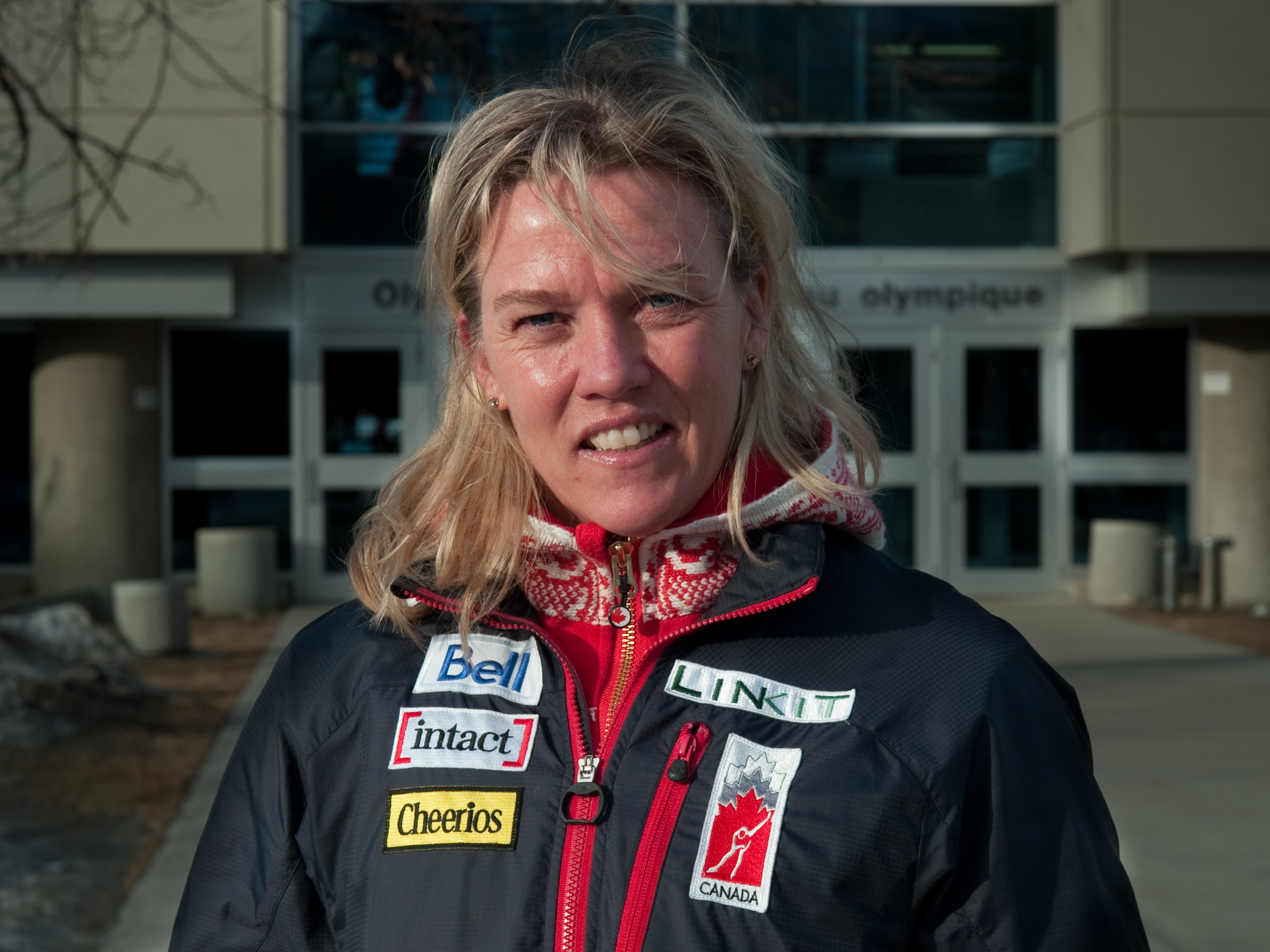
Paul in 2010

In the 1990s Paul moved to Canada where from 1992 to 1998 she was head coach of the national team. In 1995, she was named Coach of the Year. At the 1998 Olympics, the team won four medals, including gold for Catriona Le May. Paul then returned to the Netherlands to finish her studies, but very soon received a training offer from the Norwegian skating association and for two years coached in Norway.

In 2000, Paul returned to the Netherlands to work with junior skaters, but soon became a personal trainer of Gretha Smit. They formed a small "team DPA", which was later joined by other skaters and became Team Telfort. The team consisted of Jan Bos, Stefan Groothuis, Tom Prince, Remco olde Heuvel, Gretha Smit, Jochem Uytdehaage, Bob de Jong and Ralf van der Rice.

=== Bribery scandal ===
In 2009, a bribery scandal evolved suggesting that someone from the Dutch Olympic team tried to buy a starting place for Gretha Smit in the 5000 m race at the 2006 Winter Olympics. An amount of 50,000 Euro was offered to the Polish skater Katarzyna Wójcicka to drop out of the race, so that Smit, who has not qualified, could compete. Wójcicka refused, and in December 2009 made the case public. A commission was appointed by the Dutch Olympic Committee and Royal Netherlands Speedskating Association to investigate the matter and confirmed the bribery attempt.

Smit won a silver medal in the 5000 m at the 2002 Olympics; Paul was her long-time coach, as well as a national coach for both the 2002 and 2006 Olympics. The name of Ab Krook, another national coach, was also mentioned. All three denied their involvement, though Paul admitted to trying to get a starting position for Smit, one way or another.

=== Cycling ===
After 2010, Paul quit speed skating and in November 2011 started working as physician with the cycling team AA Drink–leontien.nl. In October 2012, she joined the Cyclingteam De Rijke-Shanks as performance adviser.
