= Geert Kuiper =

Dutch speed skater

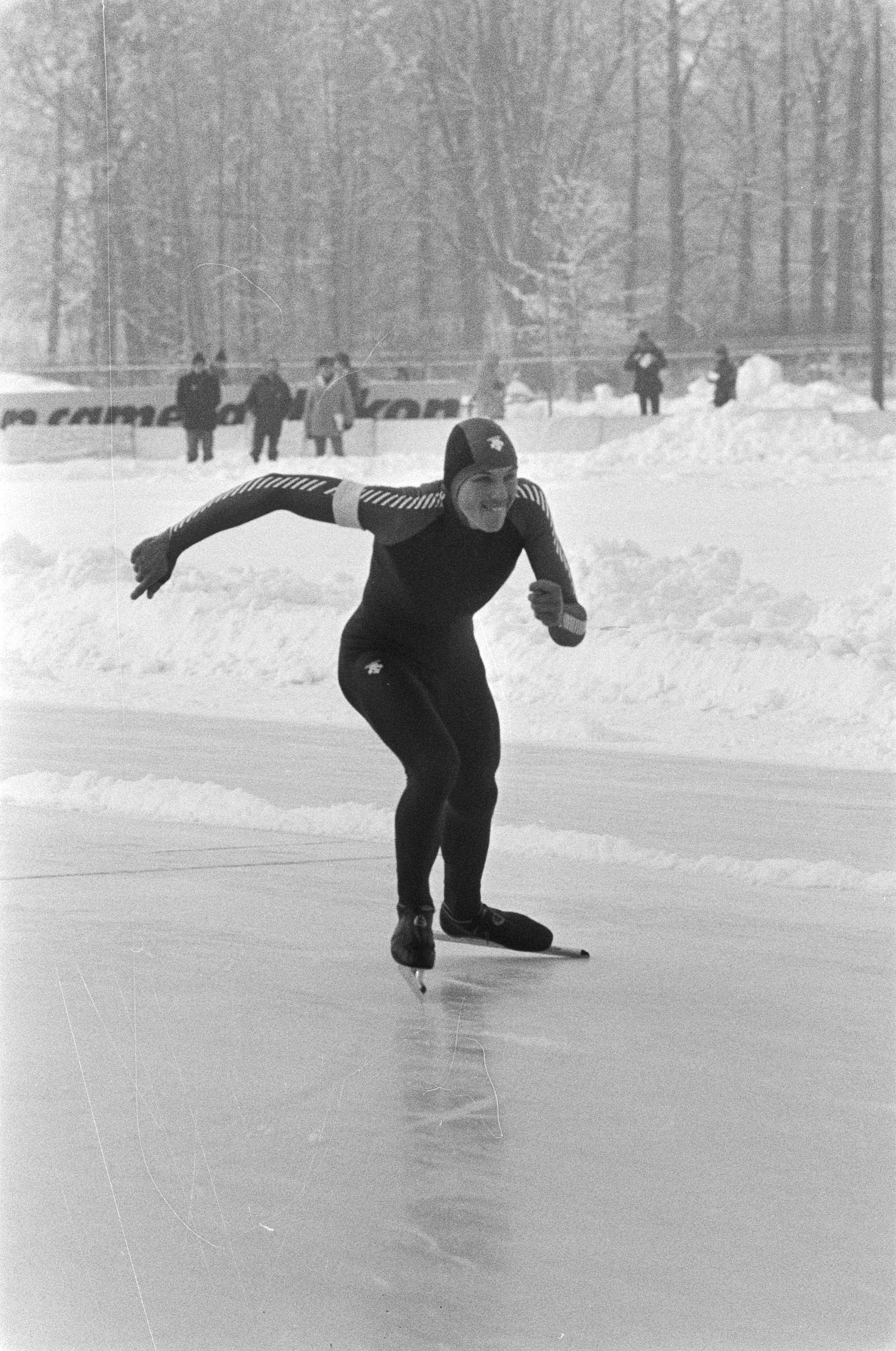
- Geert Kuiper in 1981

Personal information
- Nationality: Dutch
- Born: 5 July 1960 (age 65) Wolvega, Netherlands

Sport
- Sport: Speed skating

Geert Kuiper (born 5 July 1960) is a Dutch speed skater. He competed in the men's 500 metres event at the 1984 Winter Olympics.
