= Marieke Stam =

Dutch speed skater

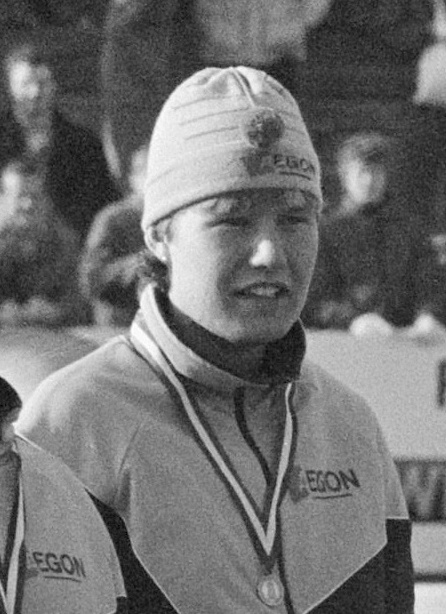
- Marieke Stam in 1985

Personal information
- Born: 21 April 1964 (age 62) Alkmaar, the Netherlands
- Height: 1.73 m (5 ft 8 in)
- Weight: 64 kg (141 lb)

Sport
- Sport: Speed skating
- Club: Egmond aan Zee

Marieke Stam (born 21 April 1964) is a retired speed skater from the Netherlands. She competed at the 1988 Winter Olympics in the 1500 m, 3000 m and 5000 m events and finished in 12th, 16th and 13th place, respectively.

Nationally, she won two titles, in 3000 m in 1989 and allround sprint in 1991, and had at least one medal in some speed skating event every year between 1985 and 1993. She retired in 1994.

Personal bests:

- 500 m – 40.78 (1991)
- 1000 m – 1:21.47 (1989)
- 1500 m – 2:05.59 (1989)
- 3000 m – 4:23.06 (1987)
- 5000 m – 7:34.29 (1987)
