= Haitske Pijlman =

Dutch speed skater

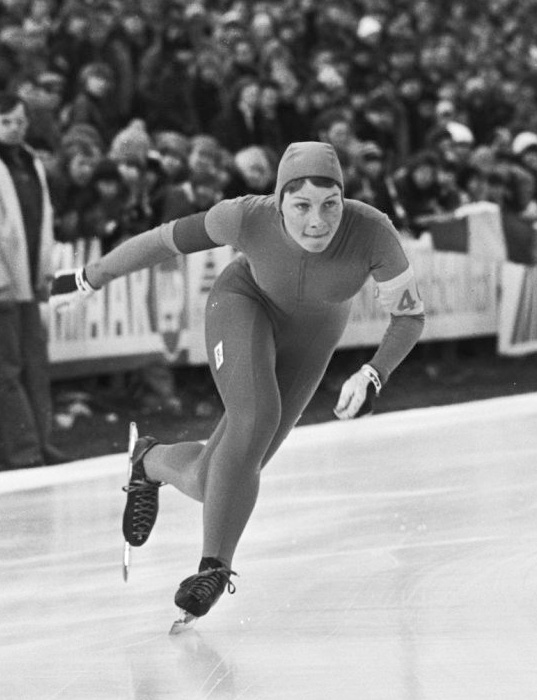
- Haitske Pijlman in 1977

Personal information
- Born: 16 June 1954 (age 72) Grouw, the Netherlands

Sport
- Sport: Speed skating

Haitske Pijlman (16 June 1954) is a retired speed skater from the Netherlands who was active between 1975 and 1980. She competed at the 1980 Winter Olympics in the 500 and 1000 m and finished in 15th and 14th place, respectively. She won a bronze medal at the World Sprint Speed Skating Championships for Women in 1977.

She married Jos Valentijn, also a competitive speed skater; their daughter Rikst Valentijn is an artistic gymnast.

Personal bests:

- 500 m – 42.44 (1980)
- 1000 m – 1:25.54 (1980)
- 1500 m – 2:14.77 (1979)
- 3000 m – 4:49.05 (1976)
