= Brigt Rykkje =

Norwegian-Dutch speed skater

Personal information
- Born: Johan Ingebrigt Rykkje; 16 June 1975 (age 51) Bergen, Norway
- Height: 1.85 m (6 ft 1 in)
- Weight: 73 kg (161 lb)

Sport
- Country: Norway; Netherlands
- Sport: Speed skating
- Club: Hardanger Skøiteklub
- Turned pro: 1992
- Retired: 2009

Achievements and titles
- Personal best(s): 500 m: 37.88 (2000); 1000 m: 1:16.20 (2001); 1500 m: 1:50.28 (2001); 3000 m: 3:48.02 (2002); 5000 m: 6:22.38 (2007); 10 000 m: 13:06.03 (2007)
Medal record
Men's speed skating
Representing the Netherlands
World Championships
Bronze medal – third place	2007 Salt Lake City	10000 m

Brigt Rykkje (born 16 June 1975) is a Dutch and Norwegian speed skater. He was born in Bergen to a Dutch mother and Norwegian father, and grew up in the Netherlands. He is the brother of Bjarne Rykkje. He competed for Norway at the 1998 Winter Olympics in Nagano. He has competed for both Norway and the Netherlands at the world championships.
