= Jos Valentijn =

Dutch speed skater

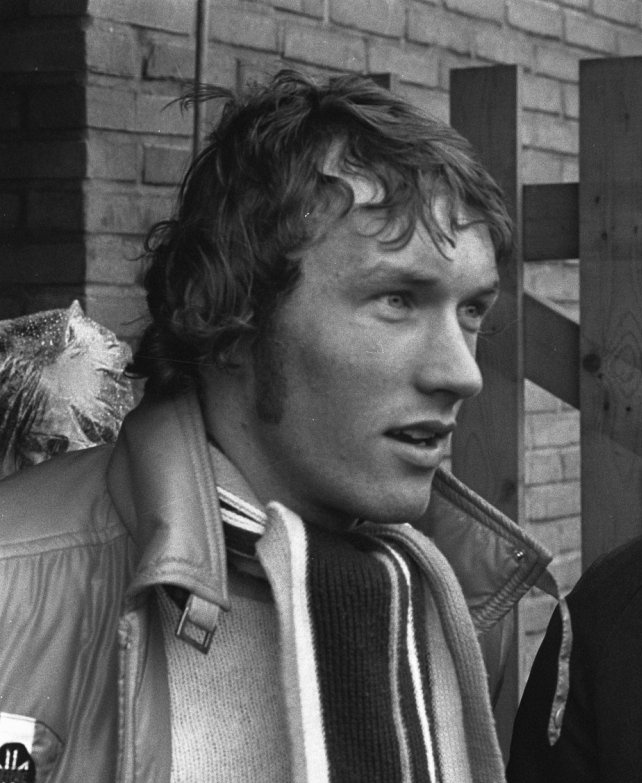
- Valentijn in 1973

Personal information
- Born: 28 March 1952 (age 74) Ter Aar, Netherlands

Sport
- Country: Netherlands
- Sport: Speed skating
Medal record
World Sprint Championships
Silver medal – second place	1973 Oslo	Sprint

Jos Valentijn (born 28 March 1952) is a retired speed skater from the Netherlands who specialized in the 500 m and 1000 m distances.

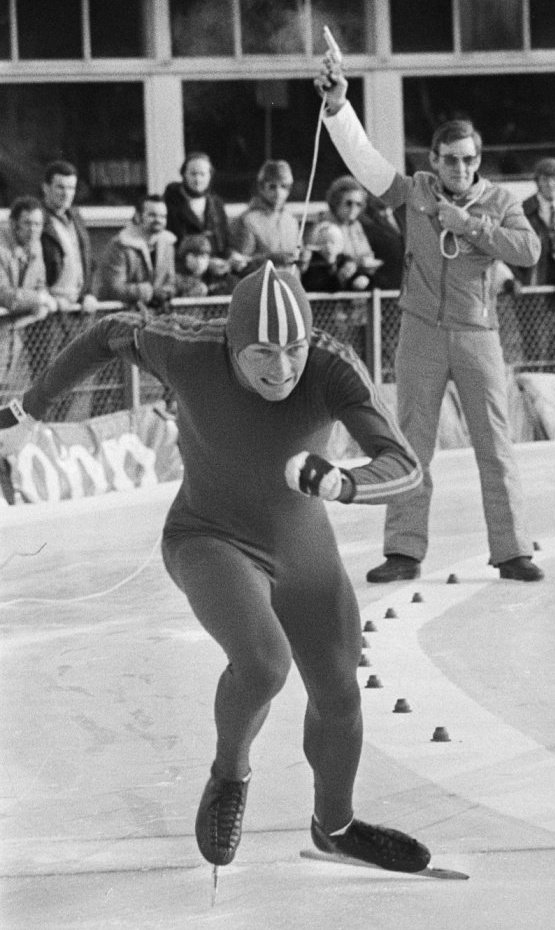
Valentijn in 1976

In 1973, Valentijn won a silver medal at the World Sprint Championships. In 1976, while leading after three events he was disqualified at the 1000 m for three consecutive false starts and was left without a medal.

His wife, Haitske Pijlman, is also a former competitive speed skater; their daughter Rikst Valentijn is an artistic gymnast.

== Personal records ==
Personal records
Men's Speed skating
Event	Result	Date	Location	Notes
500 meter	38.40	20 February 1977	Innsbruck	
1000 meter	1:17.3	5 February 1976	Davos	
1500 meter	2:00.33	31 January 1976	Davos	
3000 meter	4:33.53	22 February 1976	Inzell	
5000 meter	7:58.4	24 January 1971	Inzell	
Sprint combination	155.375	21/22 February 1976	Inzell	

== Tournament overview ==
Season	Dutch Championships Sprint	World Championships Sprint
1969–70	DEVENTER (bronze) 500m 4th 1000m (bronze) 500m (bronze) 1000m (bronze) overall	
1970–71	AMSTERDAM 6th 500m 5th 1000m (bronze) 500m (silver) 1000m 4th overall	
1971–72	DEVENTER (silver) 500m (gold) 1000m (silver) 500m 6th 1000m 6th overall	ESKILSTUNA 9th 500m 13th 1000m 12th 500m 14th 1000m 10th overall
1972–73	HEERENVEEN (gold) 500m (bronze) 1000m (gold) 500m (gold) 1000m (gold) overall	OSLO (bronze) 500m (gold) 1000m 5th 500m (silver) 1000m (silver) overall
1973–74		
1974–75	ASSEN (silver) 500m (silver) 1000m (gold) 500m (silver) 1000m (silver) overall	
1975–76	GRONINGEN (silver) 500m (gold) 1000m (silver) 500m (bronze) 1000m (gold) overall	BERLIN (bronze) 500m 4th 1000m (silver) 500m DQ 1000m NC overall
1976–77	ASSEN (gold) 500m (gold) 1000m (silver) 500m (silver) 1000m (gold) overall	ALKMAAR 4th 500m (bronze) 1000m 5th 500m 12th 1000m 4th overall
1977–78	EINDHOVEN (silver) 500m (silver) 1000m (gold) 500m (silver) 1000m (silver) overall	LAKE PLACID 9th 500m 4th 1000m 9th 500m 5th 1000m 4th overall
1978–79	HEERENVEEN (bronze) 500m 5th 1000m 10th 500m 5th 1000m 5th overall	
1979–80	THE HAGUE (silver) 500m 4th 1000m 4th 500m DNF 1000m NC overall	

DQ = Disqualified
DNF = Did not finish
NC = No classification

== Medals won ==
Championship	Gold (gold)	Silver (silver)	Bronze (bronze)
World Sprint classification	0	1	0
Dutch Sprint classification	3	2	1
