= Renske Vellinga =

Dutch ice speed skater

Personal information
- Born: 26 October 1974 Heerenveen, Netherlands
- Died: 19 February 1994 (aged 19) Sneek, Netherlands

Sport
- Country: Netherlands
- Sport: Speed skating

Renske Vellinga (26 October 1974 – 19 February 1994) was a speed skater from the Netherlands, who won a bronze and a silver medal at the 1993 Dutch Single Distance Championships.

== Death ==
A year later she died when she drove her car into a tree. Her death shocked the Dutch Olympians who were in Hamar, Norway at that time to compete at the 1994 Winter Olympics. Her friend Marianne Timmer twice won an Olympic Gold medal on the anniversary of Vellinga's death, at the 1998 and 2006 Winter Olympics. Vellinga was fellow skater Ids Postma's girlfriend at the time of her death.
