= Herma Meijer =

Dutch speed skater

Personal information
- Born: 16 April 1969 (age 57) Assen, the Netherlands
- Height: 1.71 m (5 ft 7 in)
- Weight: 62 kg (137 lb)

Sport
- Sport: Speed skating
- Club: Trainingsgroep De Scheuvelloper, Assen
Medal record
Dutch Allround championships
Gold medal – first place	1990 Assen	Allround

Herma Meijer (born 16 April 1969) is a retired speed skater from the Netherlands who was active between 1987 and 1993. She competed at the 1992 Winter Olympics in the 500 and 1000 m and finished in 11th and 12th place, respectively. She won two national titles, in the 500 m (1989) and 1500 m (1990).

Personal bests:

- 500 m – 40.53 (1989)
- 1000 m – 1:22.88 (1989)
- 1500 m – 2:05.98 (1990)
- 3000 m – 4:27.62 (1990)
- 5000 m – 7:37.65 (1990)
