= Thomas Bos =

Dutch speed skater

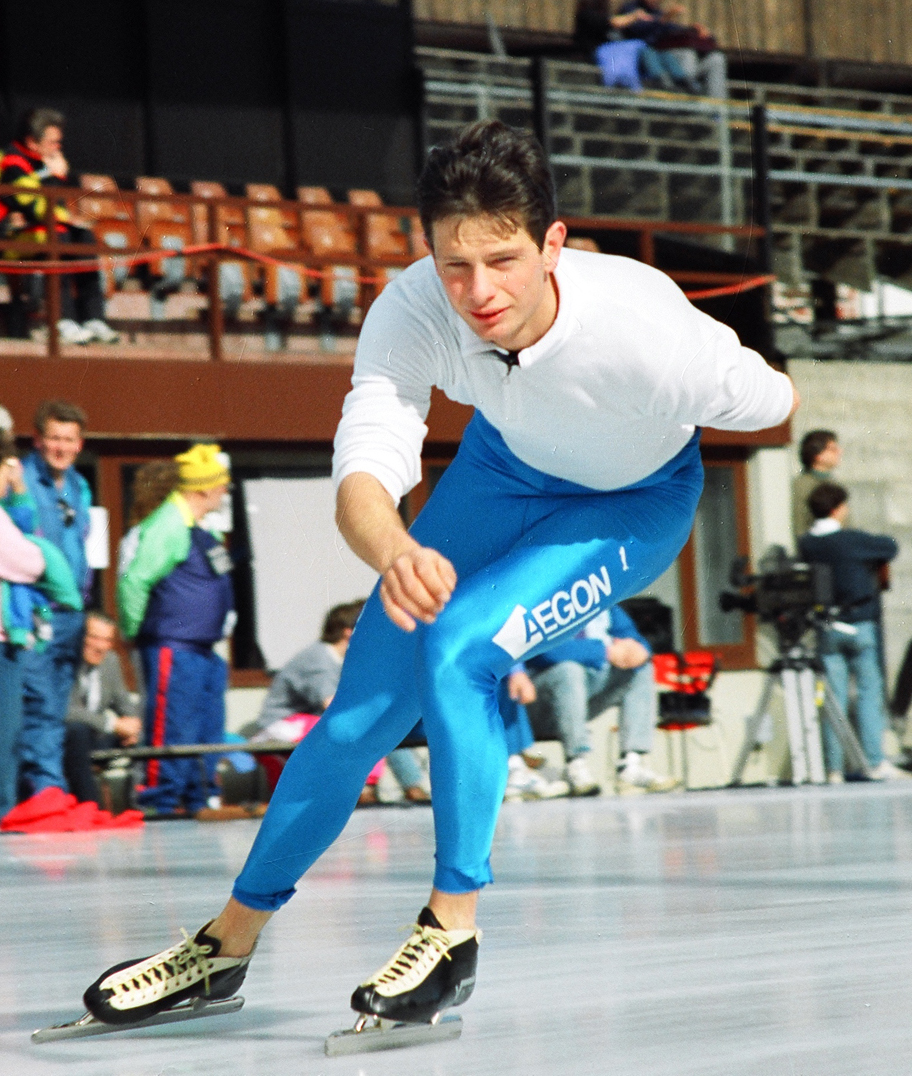

Personal information
- Born: 5 July 1968 (age 57) The Hague, the Netherlands
- Height: 1.90 m (6 ft 3 in)
- Weight: 82 kg (181 lb)

Sport
- Sport: Speed skating
- Club: Delftse Kunstijsbaan Vereniging

Thomas Bos (born 5 July 1968) is a retired speed skater from the Netherlands who was active between 1987 and 1993. In 1992, he set a new world record in the 3000 m. The same year he competed in 10000 m at the 1992 Winter Olympics and finished in 11th place. He won the same event at the national championships in 1990 and finished second in 1989 and third in 1992. His best all round achievement was a bronze medal at the national championships in 1990 and fourth place at the world championships in 1991.

Personal bests:

- 500 m – 0:38.52 (1992)
- 1000 m – 1:15.02 (1992)
- 1500 m – 1:53.16 (1992)
- 5000 m – 6:44.24 (1992)
- 10000 m – 13:54.99 (1992)
