= Arie Loef =

Dutch speed skater

Personal information
- Born: 11 February 1969 (age 57) Gorinchem, the Netherlands
- Height: 1.90 m (6 ft 3 in)
- Weight: 87 kg (192 lb)

Sport
- Country: Netherlands
- Sport: Speed skating
- Club: IJsclub Eindhoven

Arie Cornelis Loef (born 11 February 1969) is a retired speed skater from the Netherlands who was active between 1987 and 1994. He competed at the 1992 and 1994 Winter Olympics in the 500 m and 1000 m with the best achievement of 14th place in the 1000 m in 1992. He won four national titles: in the 500 m (1990), 1000 m (1990) and sprint allround (1989 and 1991).

He married Anke Baier, an Olympic speed skater from Germany.

Personal bests:

- 500 m – 37.18 (1994)
- 1000 m – 1:14.03 (1989)
- 1500 m – 1:57.15 (1993)
- 5000 m – 7:56.17 (1987)
