= Robert Vunderink =

Dutch speed skater

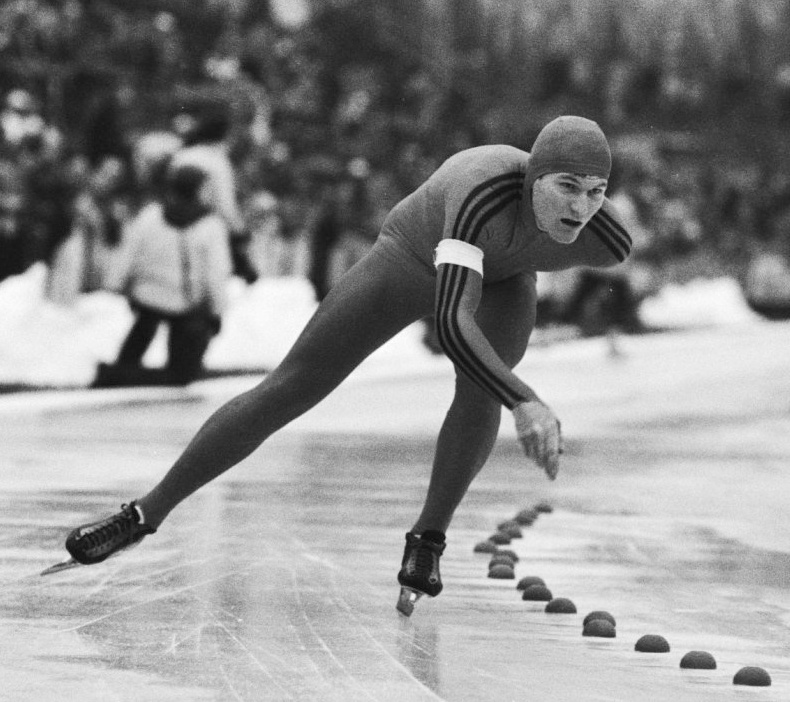
- Robert Vunderink in 1983

Personal information
- Born: 28 August 1961 (age 64) Zwolle, the Netherlands
- Height: 1.82 m (6 ft 0 in)
- Weight: 77 kg (170 lb)

Sport
- Sport: Speed skating

Robert Vunderink (born 28 August 1961) is a retired speed skater from the Netherlands who was active between 1981 and 1993. He competed at the 1984 and 1992 Winter Olympics in the 5000 m and 10000 m; his best achievement was fourth place in the 10000 m in 1992.

He finished in second place at the national allround championships in 1983 and then focused on long distances, winning the 10000 m in 1987 and 1989, finishing second in 1991 and 1992, and third in 1990. He was less successful in 5000 m, with a silver medal at the national championship in 1989 and two bronze medals in 1991 and 1992.

Personal bests:

- 500 m – 40.03 (1985)
- 1000 m – 1:18.60 (1985)
- 1500 m – 1:59.23 (1982)
- 5000 m – 6:51.43 (1992)
- 10000 m – 14:02.34 (1992)
