= Christine Aaftink =

Dutch speed skater (born 1966)

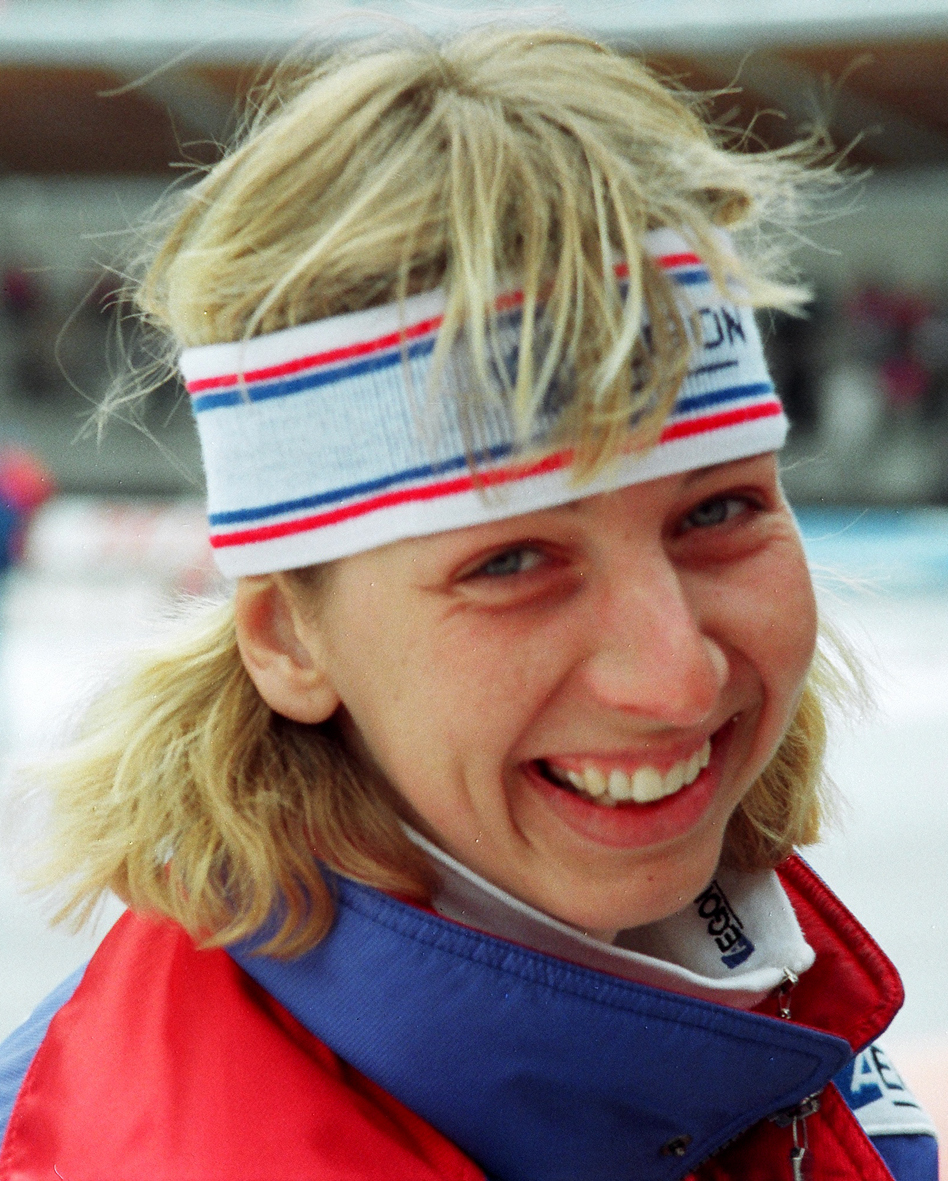

Personal information
- Born: Christine Jacoba Aaftink; 25 August 1966 (age 59) Abcoude, Netherlands
- Height: 1.85 m (6 ft 1 in)
- Weight: 82 kg (181 lb)

Sport
- Sport: Speed skating
- Club: IJsclub Baambrugge
Medal record
Women's speed skating
World Championships
Bronze medal – third place	1990 Tromsø	Sprint
Bronze medal – third place	1991 Inzell	Sprint
Dutch Sprint Championships
Gold medal – first place	1987 Deventer	Sprint
Gold medal – first place	1988 Alkmaar	Sprint
Gold medal – first place	1989 Heerenveen	Sprint
Gold medal – first place	1990 Assen	Sprint
Gold medal – first place	1992 Heerenveen	Sprint
Gold medal – first place	1993 Utrecht	Sprint
Gold medal – first place	1994 Den Haag	Sprint
Silver medal – second place	1991 Assen	Sprint
Silver medal – second place	1996 Assen	Sprint
Bronze medal – third place	1995 Alkmaar	Sprint

Christine Jacoba Aaftink (born 25 August 1966) is a Dutch former speed skater. She made her international debut in 1988 and was the best Dutch sprinter in the first half of the 1990s. She specialized in the 500 m and 1000 m distances, in which she competed at the 1988, 1992 and 1994 Winter Olympics. Her best achievements were fifth and fourth place in 1992 in 500 m and 1000 m, respectively. In 1994 she was the Olympic flag bearer for the Netherlands. She won two bronze medals at the World Sprint Speed Skating Championships for Women in 1990 and 1991.

Nationally, she won at least one sprint title every year between 1987 and 1996. She won all three (500 m, 1000 m and allround sprint) in 1990 and 1992–1994.

== Personal Bests ==
- 500 m – 39.88 (1996)
- 1000 m – 1:20.21 (1996)
- 1500 m – 2:11.57 (1994)
- 3000 m – 5:04.33 (1987)

== Records ==
- 8th place in the World Sprint Championships (1988)
- 12th place in the Olympic Games in Calgary (1989)
- 5th place in the World Sprint Championships in Netherlands (1990)
- 3rd place in the World Sprints (1990)
- 3rd place in the tournament in Inzell (1991)
- 5th position in the 500 and a 4th in the 1,000 in the Olympics in Albertville (1992)
- 19th and 20th at a World Sprints podium (1993)
- 5th place in the 1,000 m of the inaugural World Single Distance Championships (1996)
- Won seven consecutive 500 metre titles (1990–96)
- Won Five 1,000 metre titles (1990–94)
- Won the Dutch sprinting title seven times (1987-1990 and 1992–1994)
- Won one World Cup race, over 500 metres
