= 2023 KNSB Dutch Single Distance Championships – Men's 500 m =

Dutch speed skating competition

- Venue: Thialf, Heerenveen
- Dates: 3 February 2023
- Competitors: 20 skaters

Medalist men
1st place, gold medalist(s)		Merijn Scheperkamp	NED
2nd place, silver medalist(s)		Hein Otterspeer	NED
3rd place, bronze medalist(s)		Stefan Westenbroek	NED

The men's 500 meter at the 2023 KNSB Dutch Single Distance Championships took place in Heerenveen at the Thialf ice skating rink on Friday 3 February 2023. There were 20 participants who raced twice over 500m so that all skaters had to start once in the inner lane and once in the outer lane. Merijn Scheperkamp, Hein Otterspeer, and Dai Dai N'tab qualified for the 2023 ISU World Speed Skating Championships in Heerenveen.

== Statistics ==
=== Result ===
Rank	Skater	1st. 500 meter	2nd. 500 meter	Samalog
1st place, gold medalist(s)	Merijn Scheperkamp	34.61 (1)	34.81 (1)	69.420
2nd place, silver medalist(s)	Hein Otterspeer	34.91 (3)	35.04 (4)	69.950
3rd place, bronze medalist(s)	Stefan Westenbroek	35.04 (5)	34.93 (2)	69.970 PR
4	Janno Botman	34.96 (4)	35.03 (3)	69.990 PR
5	Dai Dai N'tab	34.89 (2)	35.28 (5)	70.170
6	Serge Yoro	35.25 (7)	35.34 (6)	70.590
7	Mika van Essen	35.33 (9) PR	35.43 (7)	70.760
8	Gijs Esders	35.27 (8)	35.51 (10)	70.780
9	Tijmen Snel	35.36 (11)	35.47 (9)	70.830
10	Joep Wennemars	35.34 (10)	35.54 (11)	70.880
11	Rem de Haar	35.58 (15)	35.46 (8) PR	71.040 PR
12	Mats Siemons	35.58 (14)	35.57 (12)	71.150 PR
13	Joost Van Dobbenburgh	35.73 (16)	35.93 (14)	71.660 PR
14	Jim Dhore	35.79 (17) PR	35.91 (13)	71.700 PR
15	Thomas Geerdinck	35.97 (19)	36.14 (15)	72.110
16	Pim Stuij	36.09 (20)	36.16 (16)	72.250
NC	Armand Broos	35.87 (18)	DNS	NC
NC	Kayo Vos	35.58 (13)	DNS	NC
NC	Sebas Diniz	35.46 (12)	DQ	NC
NC	Thomas Krol	35.16 (6)	DNS	NC

· DNS = Did not start · NC = No classification

=== Draw 1st. 500 meter ===
Heat	Outer lane	Inner lane
1	Joost Van Dobbenburgh	Jim Dhore
2	Mats Siemons	Rem de Haar
3	Pim Stuij	Armand Broos
4	Mika van Essen	Thomas Geerdinck
5	Joep Wennemars	Serge Yoro
6	Tijmen Snel	Kayo Vos
7	Thomas Krol	Gijs Esders
8	Dai Dai N'tab	Merijn Scheperkamp
9	Sebas Diniz	Janno Botman
10	Hein Otterspeer	Stefan Westenbroek

=== Draw 2nd. 500 meter ===
Heat	Outer lane	Inner lane
1	Pim Stuij	
2	Thomas Geerdinck	Joost Van Dobbenburgh
3	Jim Dhore	Mats Siemons
4	Rem de Haar	Sebas Diniz
5	Gijs Esders	Tijmen Snel
6	Serge Yoro	Joep Wennemars
7	Stefan Westenbroek	Mika van Essen
8	Janno Botman	Hein Otterspeer
9	Merijn Scheperkamp	Dai Dai N'tab

Referee: Bert Timmerman. Assistant: Frank Spoel. Starter: Janny Smegen
