= KNSB Dutch Super Sprint Championships =

The Dutch Super Sprint Championships of speed skating, organised by the Royal Dutch Speed Skating Association (KNSB), is the official Dutch championship to determine the Dutch Super Sprint champion. The Sprint distance championships date back to 1991 for men and 1992 for women.

Usually two distances are skated twice, the 100m and the 300m. The championships were created as a modern substitute in indoor skating rinks for the more traditional straight track form used in Kortebaanschaatsen tournaments over a distance of 140 and 160 meters, which are only available in winter on city canals. In 2013 and 2014 a new format called 'Pure Sprint' was introduced where competitors skate the 100, 300, and 500 meters once each.

== Men's super sprint ==
Men's medalists
Year	Venue	Gold	Silver	Bronze
1991	The Hague	Tjerk Terpstra	Gerard Aardema	Bauke Jonkman
1992	Deventer	Arie Loef	Jan Jan Brouwer	Gerad van Velde
1993	Groningen	Gerard van Velde	Nico van der Vlies	Rien Smulders
1994	Utrecht	Arjan Overdevest	Wojciech Biziuk	Marcel Bliek
1995	Alkmaar	Andries Kramer	Arjan Overdevest	Rogier Pastor
1996	Deventer	Andries Kramer	Sander Velt	Niels Greidanus
1997	Deventer	Andries Kramer	Jakko Jan Leeuwangh	Richard de Jong
1998	Utrecht	Jakko Jan Leeuwangh	André Zonderland	Sander Velt
1999	Utrecht	André Zonderland	Robbert Westerveld	Richard de Jong
2000	Utrecht	André Zonderland	Jacob Kleibeuker	Bas Brusche
2001	Groningen	Jakko Jan Leeuwangh	Jeroen Hairwassers	Dennis Kalker
2002	Deventer	Dennis Kalker	Arjen Rients	Arjan Samplonius
2003	Assen	Gerard van Velde	Dennis Kalker	Alexander Oltrop
2004	Assen	Michael Poot	Bas Brusche	Pim Brusche
2005	Assen	Michael Poot	Dennis Kalker	Johan Zonderland
2006	Alkmaar	Michael Poot	Ronald Mulder	Dennis Kalker
2007	Groningen	Ronald van Slooten	Michael Poot	Freddy Wennemars
2008	Breda	Ronald van Slooten	Freddy Wennemars	Michel Mulder
2009	Enschede	Jan Smeekens	Michel Mulder	Jesper Hospes
2010	Hoorn	Michael Poot	Ronald Mulder	Michel Mulder
2011	Enschede	Jacques de Koning	Ronald Mulder	Michel Mulder
2012	Tilburg	Bas Bervoets	Freddy Wennemars	Bauke Wiersma
2013	The Hague	Jesper Hospes	Jacques de Koning	Allard Niemeijer
2014	Hoorn	Jesper Hospes	Oscar van Leen	Rudy Meereboer
2015	Tilburg	Dai Dai Ntab	Oscar van Leen	Rudy Meereboer
2016	The Hague	Michel Mulder	Dai Dai Ntab	Oscar van Leen
2017	Breda	Dai Dai Ntab	Jesper Hospes	Martijn van Oosten
2018	Groningen	Michel Mulder	Jesper Hospes	Dai Dai Ntab
2019	Deventer	Aron Romeijn	Jesper Hospes	Dai Dai Ntab
2020	Amsterdam	Aron Romeijn	Jesper Hospes	Tijmen Snel

Source: www.schaatsen.nl

== Women's super sprint ==
Women's medalists
Year	Venue	Gold	Silver	Bronze
1992	Deventer	Herma Meijer	Christine Aaftink	Anita Loorbach
1993	Groningen	Herma Meijer	Anita Loorbach	Christine Aaftink
1994	Utrecht	Sandra Voetelink	Janine Koudenburg	Annet Koeleman
1995	Alkmaar	Anita Loorbach	Leontien van Meggelen	Andrea Nuyt
1996	Deventer	Yvonne Leever	Paula Buijtenhuijs	Arina Schingenga
1997	Deventer	Leontien van Meggelen	Nathalie ten Hoor	Dianne Kootstra
1998	Utrecht	Frouke Oonk	Yvonne Leever	Dianne Kootstra
1999	Utrecht	Marloes Gelderblom	Dianne Kootstra	Cindy Groen
2000	Utrecht	Marloes Gelderblom	Dianne Koostra	Cindy Groen
2001	Groningen	Dianne Kootstra	Arina Schingenga	Janet Boelen
2002	Deventer	Arina Schingenga	Frouke Oonk	Cindy Groen
2003	Assen	Andrea Nuyt	Cindy Groen	Tijn Ponjee
2004	Assen	Willeke van Benthem	Marloes Gelderblom	Emilie Gale
2005	Assen	Marloes Gelderblom	Emilie Gale	Esther Boer
2006	Alkmaar	Laurine van Riessen	Marloes Gelderblom	Emilie Gale
2007	Groningen	Emilie Gale	Esmeralda Nieuwendorp	Inge van Essen
2008	Breda	Emilie Gale	Mayon Kuipers	Jorien Kranenborg
2009	Enschede	Thijsje Oenema	Esmeralda Nieuwendorp	Ellen Hazelaar
2010	Hoorn	Leslie Koen	Jorien Kranenborg	Ellen Hazelaar; Renske Herder
2011	Enschede	Thijsje Oenema	Mayon Kuipers	Jorien Kranenborg
2012	Tilburg	Floor van den Brandt	Leslie Koen	Esmeralda Nieuwendorp
2013	The Hague	Mayon Kuipers	Leslie Koen	Floor van den Brandt
2014	Hoorn	Floor van den Brandt	Janine Smit	Mayon Kuipers
2015	Tilburg	Thijsje Oenema	Floor van den Brandt	Annette Gerritsen
2016	The Hague	Annette Gerritsen	Bente van de Berge	Rosa Pater
2017	Breda	Floor van den Brandt	Janine Smit	Dione Voskamp
2018	Groningen	Dione Voskamp	Floor van den Brandt	Janine Smit
2019	Deventer	Janine Smit	Floor van den Brandt	Dione Voskamp
2020	Amsterdam	Dione Voskamp	Helga Drost	Isabelle van Elst

Source: www.schaatsen.nl
