= 2023 KNSB Dutch Single Distance Championships – Men's 1000 m =

Dutch speed skating competition

- Venue: Thialf, Heerenveen
- Dates: 5 February 2023
- Competitors: 22 skaters

Medalist men
1st place, gold medalist(s)		Kjeld Nuis	NED
2nd place, silver medalist(s)		Hein Otterspeer	NED
3rd place, bronze medalist(s)		Thomas Krol	NED

The men's 1000 meter at the 2023 KNSB Dutch Single Distance Championships took place in Heerenveen at the Thialf ice skating rink on Sunday 5 February 2023. There were 22 participants. Kjeld Nuis, Hein Otterspeer, and Thomas Krol qualified for the 2023 ISU World Speed Skating Championships in Heerenveen.

== Statistics ==
=== Result ===
Rank	Skater	Time
1st place, gold medalist(s)	Kjeld Nuis	1:08.04
2nd place, silver medalist(s)	Hein Otterspeer	1:08.08
3rd place, bronze medalist(s)	Thomas Krol	1:08.37
4	Joep Wennemars	1:08.43
5	Merijn Scheperkamp	1:08.99
6	Wesly Dijs	1:09.05
7	Tijmen Snel	1:09.35
8	Janno Botman	1:09.38
9	Dai Dai N'tab	1:09.46
10	Serge Yoro	1:09.54
11	Mats Siemons	1:09.58
12	Tim Prins	1:09.71
13	Gijs Esders	1:09.78
14	Kayo Vos	1:10.11
15	Stefan Westenbroek	1:10.49
16	Mika van Essen	1:10.50
17	Sebas Diniz	1:10.85
18	Chris Fredriks	1:11.22
19	Joost Van Dobbenburgh	1:11.40
20	Joep Kalverdijk	1:13.52
NC	Louis Hollaar	WDR
NC	Armond Broos	WDR

- WDR = Withdrew

Referee: Bert Timmermans. Assistant: Frank Spoel. Starter: Janny Smegen

=== Draw ===
Heat	Inner lane	Outer lane
1	Joost Van Dobbenburgh	Joep Kalverdijk
2	Mika van Essen	Chris Fredriks
3	Tim Prins	Sebas Diniz
4	Mats Siemons	Serge Yoro
5	Tijmen Snel	Dai Dai N'tab
6	Joep Wennemars	Gijs Esders
7	Kayo Vos	Stefan Westenbroek
8	Thomas Krol	Hein Otterspeer
9	Kjeld Nuis	Janno Botman
10	Wesly Dijs	Merijn Scheperkamp
