= 2013 KNSB Dutch Super Sprint Championships =

Speed skating competition in the Netherlands

KNSB Dutch Super Sprint Championships
- Venue: De Uithof, The Hague
- Dates: 2 February 2013

The 2013 KNSB Dutch Super Sprint Championships in speed skating were held at De Uithof The Hague at 2 February 2013. It was the 23rd edition of this championships.

The seniors and the juniors in category A skate a combination, called "pure sprint", over the distances 100m, 300m and 500m. The juniors in category B and C skate a combination, called "supersprint", over the distances 2x100m and 2x300m. The resulting times have been measured in seconds and then converted to points, using the average times on 100 meter units; thus the number of points for a 300 meters race is the time in seconds divided by three; for the 500 meters, the time in seconds is divided by five. Points are calculated to three decimal places and truncation is applied; the numbers are not rounded. All points are added up; the lower the score the better.

== Medalists ==
Category		1st place, gold medalist(s)		2nd place, silver medalist(s)		3rd place, bronze medalist(s)	
Category		Skater	Total Points	Skater	Total Points	Skater	Total Points
Seniors	Men	Jesper Hospes	24,683	Jacques de Koning	25,020	Allard Neijmeijer	25,163
Seniors	Women	Mayon Kuipers	27,135	Leslie Koen	27,566	Floor van den Brandt	27,574
Juniors A	Boys	Alexander van Hasselt	25,535	Dai Dai Ntab	25,836	Bob Beijen	26,060
Juniors A	Girls	Bente van den Berge	27,708	Steffi Wubben	28,308	Maud van der Meer	28,388
Juniors B	Boys	Jelte Boersma	37,216	Thomas van Dijk	37,740	Barry Spaan	37,766
Juniors B	Girls	Dione Voskamp	40,016	Tessa Boogaard	40,459	Aveline Hylkema	40,496
Juniors C	Boys	Niek Deelstra	38,372	Niels Delen	38,626	Daan Baks	39,003
Juniors C	Girls	Aafke Soet	40,813	Freya Reitsma	41,116	Jutta Leerdam	41,193
