= 2022 KNSB Dutch Single Distance Championships – Men's 1000 m =

Dutch speed skating competition

- Venue: Thialf, Heerenveen
- Dates: 31 October 2021
- Competitors: 24 skaters

Medalist men
1st place, gold medalist(s)		Kai Verbij	NED
2nd place, silver medalist(s)		Hein Otterspeer	NED
3rd place, bronze medalist(s)		Thomas Krol	NED

The men's 1000 meter at the 2022 KNSB Dutch Single Distance Championships took place in Heerenveen at the Thialf ice skating rink on Sunday 31 October 2021. There were 24 participants. Although the tournament was held in 2021 it was the 2022 edition as it was part of the 2021–2022 speed skating season. The first 5 skaters were eligible for the following World Cup tournaments.

== Statistics ==
=== Result ===
Rank	Skater	Time
1st place, gold medalist(s)	Kai Verbij	1:07.69
2nd place, silver medalist(s)	Hein Otterspeer	1:07.82
3rd place, bronze medalist(s)	Thomas Krol	1:07.87
4	Kjeld Nuis	1:07.88
5	Merijn Scheperkamp	1:08.10 PR
6	Tijmen Snel	1:08.46 PR
7	Dai Dai N'tab	1:08.64
8	Serge Yoro	1:08.70
9	Wesly Dijs	1:08.75
10	Louis Hollaar	1:08.89
11	Tjerk de Boer	1:09.14 PR
12	Tim Prins	1:09.15 PR
13	Lennart Velema	1:09.36
14	Janno Botman	1:09.46 PR
15	Thomas Geerdinck	1:09.55 PR
16	Gils Esders	1:09.63
17	Joep Wennemars	1:09.82 PR
18	Joost Van Dobbenburgh	1:10.28
19	Chris Fredriks	1:10.53 PR
20	Jur Veenje	1:10.87 PR
21	Gert Wieda	1:10.95 PR
22	Niels d'Huy	1:10.99 PR
23	Joep Kalverdijk	1:11.13
24	Sebas Diniz	1:11.88

Referee: Bert Timmermans. Assistant: Wil Schildwacht. Starter: Jans Rosing
Start: 15:32.00 hr. Finish: 16:02.17 hr.

=== Draw ===
Heat	Inner lane	Outer lane
1	Sebas Diniz	Gert Wieda
2	Jur Veenje	Joep Kalverdijk
3	Niels d'Huy	Chris Fredriks
4	Tim Prins	Tjerk de Boer
5	Joost van Dobbenburgh	Joep Wennemars
6	Thomas Geerdinck	Janno Botman
7	Lennart Velema	Merijn Scheperkamp
8	Louis Hollaar	Gijs Esders
9	Dai Dai N'tab	Tijmen Snel
10	Hein Otterspeer	Wesly Dijs
11	Thomas Krol	Kai Verbij
12	Serge Yoro	Kjeld Nuis
