= 2020 KNSB Dutch Single Distance Championships – Men's 500 m =

- Venue: Thialf, Heerenveen
- Dates: 27 December 2019

Medalist men
1st place, gold medalist(s)		Dai Dai N'tab	NED
2nd place, silver medalist(s)		Jan Smeekens	NED
3rd place, bronze medalist(s)		Kai Verbij	NED

The men's 500 meter at the 2020 KNSB Dutch Single Distance Championships took place in Heerenveen at the Thialf ice skating rink on Friday 27 December 2019. There were 22 participants.

== Statistics ==
=== Result ===
Position	Skater	Heat	Lane	Time
1st place, gold medalist(s)	Dai Dai N'tab	9	O	34.37
2nd place, silver medalist(s)	Jan Smeekens	11	O	34.81
3rd place, bronze medalist(s)	Kai Verbij	10	O	34.87
4	Hein Otterspeer	8	I	34.91
5	Jesper Hospes	7	O	35.12
6	Thomas Krol	6	I	35.17
7	Lennart Velema	7	I	35.23
8	Gijs Esders	10	I	35.25
9	Michel Mulder	11	I	35.27
10	Tijmen Snel	4	O	35.35 PR
11	Ronald Mulder	9	I	35.38
12	Aron Romeijn	6	O	35.51
13	Thomas Geerdinck	2	O	35.57 PR
14	Janno Botman	3	O	35.58
15	Merijn Scheperkamp	3	I	35.68
16	Gerben Jorritsma	8	O	35.70
17	Tom Kant	5	O	35.82
18	Sebas Diniz	2	I	35.90 PR
19	Joost van Dobbenburgh	5	I	35.95
20	Mika van Essen	4	I	36.12
21	Jarle Gerrits	1	I	36.14 PR
22	Thijs Govers	1	O	36.30

Referee: Hanjo Heideman. Assistant: Wil Schildwacht
Starter: Janny Smegen Start: 18:20 hr. Finish: 18:41 hr

=== Draw ===
Heat	Inside lane	Outside lane
1	Jarle Gerrits	Thijs Govers
2	Sebas Diniz	Thomas Geerdinck
3	Merijn Scheperkamp	Janno Botman
4	Mika van Essen	Tijmen Snel
5	Joost van Dobbenburgh	Tom Kant
6	Thomas Krol	Aron Romeijn
7	Lennart Velema	Jesper Hospes
8	Hein Otterspeer	Gerben Jorritsma
9	Ronald Mulder	Dai Dai N'tab
10	Gijs Esders	Kai Verbij
11	Michel Mulder	Jan Smeekens
