= 2022 KNSB Dutch Single Distance Championships – Men's 500 m =

Dutch speed skating competition

- Venue: Thialf, Heerenveen
- Dates: 29 October 2021
- Competitors: 24 skaters

Medalist men
1st place, gold medalist(s)		Kai Verbij	NED
2nd place, silver medalist(s)		Dai Dai N'tab	NED
3rd place, bronze medalist(s)		Hein Otterspeer	NED

The men's 500 meter at the 2022 KNSB Dutch Single Distance Championships took place in Heerenveen at the Thialf ice skating rink on Friday 29 October 2021. Although the tournament was held in 2021 it was the 2022 edition as it was part of the 2021–2022 speed skating season. There were 24 participants who raced twice over 500m so that all skaters had to start once in the inner lane and once in the outer lane. The first 4 skaters plus Merijn Scheperkamp were eligible for the following World Cup tournaments.

== Statistics ==
=== Result ===
Rank	Skater	1st. 500 meter	2nd. 500 meter	Time
1st place, gold medalist(s)	Kai Verbij	34.796 (1)	34.710 (1)	69.506
2nd place, silver medalist(s)	Dai Dai N'tab	35.164 (4)	34.927 (3)	70.091
3rd place, bronze medalist(s)	Hein Otterspeer	34.897 (2)	35.226 (6)	70.123
4	Janno Botman	35.050 (3) PR	35.189 (5)	70.239
5	Tijmen Snel	35.249 (7)	35.144 (4) PR	70.393
6	Thomas Geerdinck	35.300 (9) PR	35.266 (7) PR	70.566
7	Gijs Esders	35.368 (10)	35.270 (8)	70.638
8	Aron Romeijn	35.248 (6)	35.544 (11)	70.792
9	Thijs Govers	35.713 (11) PR	35.434 (10) PR	71.147
10	Joost Van Dobbenburgh	35.773 (16)	35.676 (12)	71.449
11	Joep Wennemars	35.718 (12) PR	35.878 (14)	71.596
12	Sebas Diniz	35.752 (15)	35.909 (15)	71.661
13	Armand Broos	35.933 (17) PR	35.739 (13) PR	71.672
14	Rem de Haar	35.274 (13) PR	36.157 (17)	71.881
15	Sven Kemp	36.021 (19) PR	36.050 (16)	72.071
16	Kai in 't Veld	36.369 (20)	36.369 (19)	72.895
NC	Serge Yoro	DNF	35.368 (9)	NC
NC	Merijn Scheperkamp	DQ	34.827 (2)	NC
NC	Stefan Westenbroek	35.222 (5) PR	DQ	NC
NC	Lennart Velema	35.274 (13)	DQ	NC
NC	Tim Prins	DQ	36.450 (18)	NC
NC	Kjeld Nuis	35.273 (8)	DNS	NC
NC	Jesper Hospes	35.981 (18)	DNS	NC
NC	Ronald Mulder	46.385 (21)	DNS	NC

=== Draw 1st. 500 meter ===
Heat	Inner lane	Outer lane
1	Armand Broos	Kai in 't Veld
2	Joep Wennemars	Rem de Haar
3	Aron Romeijn	Sven Kemp
4	Sebas Diniz	Thomas Geerdinck
5	Tim Prins	Serge Yoro
6	Joost Van Dobbenburgh	Thijs Govers
7	Gijs Esders	Stefan Westenbroek
8	Tijmen Snel	Janno Botman
9	Jesper Hospes	Kjeld Nuis
10	Merijn Scheperkamp	Hein Otterspeer
11	Lennart Velema	Kai Verbij
12	Ronald Mulder	Dai Dai N'tab

=== Draw 2nd. 500 meter ===
Heat	Inner lane	Outer lane
1	Serge Yoro	
2	Kai in 't Veld	Merijn Scheperkamp
3	Sven Kemp	Tim Prins
4	Rem de Haar	Armand Broos
5	Thijs Govers	Joost Van Dobbenburgh
6	Thomas Geerdinck	Sebas Diniz
7	Stefan Westenbroek	Lennart Velema
8	Dai Dai N'tab	Joep Wennemars
9	Janno Botman	Gijs Esders
10	Hein Otterspeer	Tijmen Snel
11	Kai Verbij	Aron Romeijn

Referee: Bert Timmermans. Assistant: Wil Schildwacht. Starter: André de Vries
