= 2021 KNSB Dutch Single Distance Championships – Men's 500 m =

Dutch speed skating competition

- Venue: Thialf, Heerenveen
- Dates: 30 October 2020
- Competitors: 18 skaters

Medalist men
1st place, gold medalist(s)		Dai Dai N'tab	NED
2nd place, silver medalist(s)		Hein Otterspeer	NED
3rd place, bronze medalist(s)		Kai Verbij	NED

The men's 500 meter at the 2021 KNSB Dutch Single Distance Championships took place in Heerenveen at the Thialf ice skating rink on Friday 30 October 2020. Although the tournament was held in 2020 it was part of the 2020–2021 speed skating season. There were 18 participants.

== Statistics ==
=== Result ===
Rank	Skater	1st. 500 meter	2nd. 500 meter	Time
1st place, gold medalist(s)	Dai Dai N'tab	34.80 (1)	34.84 (1)	69.640
2nd place, silver medalist(s)	Hein Otterspeer	35.02 (2)	34.86 (2)	69.880
3rd place, bronze medalist(s)	Kai Verbij	35.13 (3)	35.24 (3)	70.370
4	Lennart Velema	35.36 (4)	35.34 (5)	70.700
5	Tijmen Snel	35.39 (6)	35.31 (4)	70.700
6	Jesper Hospes	35.46 (8)	35.42 (7)	70.880
7	Merijn Scheperkamp	35.37 (5)	35.53 (8)	70.900
8	Stefan Westenbroek	35.58 (9)	35.36 (6)	70.940
9	Thomas Geerdinck	35.85 (11)	35.71 (9)	71.560
10	Serge Yoro	35.64 (10)	35.95 (10)	71.590
11	Gijs Esders	35.86 (12)	36.05 (11)	71.910
12	Joost Van Dobbenburgh	36.16 (14)	36.09 (12)	72.250
13	Tom Kant	36.21 (15)	36.17 (14)	72.380
14	Thijs Govers	36.56 (17)	36.13 (13)	72.690
15	Elwin Jongman	36.36 (16)	36.70 (15)	73.060
NC	Kjeld Nuis	35.40 (7)	DNS	NC
NC	Mika van Essen	36.14 (13)	DQ	NC
NC	Sebas Diniz	DQ	36.98 (16)	NC

=== Draw 1st. 500 meter ===
Heat	Inside lane	Outside lane
1	Joost Van Dobbenburgh	Thijs Govers
2	Mika van Essen	Elwin Jongman
3	Sebas Diniz	Tom Kant
4	Serge Yoro	Kjeld Nuis
5	Thomas Geerdinck	Merijn Scheperkamp
6	Stefan Westenbroek	Tijmen Snel
7	Gijs Esders	Lennart Velema
8	Dai Dai N'tab	Hein Otterspeer
9	Kai Verbij	Jesper Hospes

=== Draw 2nd. 500 meter ===
Heat	Inside lane	Outside lane
1		Sebas Diniz
2	Thijs Govers	Joost Van Dobbenburgh
3	Elwin Jongman	Mika van Essen
4	Tom Kant	Gijs Esders
5	Jesper Hospes	Thomas Geerdinck
6	Tijmen Snel	Serge Yoro
7	Merijn Scheperkamp	Stefan Westenbroek
8	Lennart Velema	Kai Verbij
9	Hein Otterspeer	Dai Dai N'tab
