= 2018 KNSB Dutch Single Distance Championships =

Speed skating tournament

KNSB Dutch Single Distance Championships
- Venue: Thialf, Heerenveen
- Dates: 27–29 October 2017

The 2018 KNSB Dutch Single Distance Championships were held at the Thialf skating rink in Heerenveen from Friday 27 October 2017 to Sunday 29 October 2017. Although the tournament was held in 2017 it was the 2018 edition as it was part of the 2017–2018 speed skating season.

== Schedule ==
Schedule
Date	Starting time	Event
Friday; 27 October 2017	18:20	Women's 3000 meter Men's 1500 meter Women's 500 meter
Saturday; 28 October 2017	15:25	Men's 5000 meter Women's 1500 meter Men's 500 meter
Sunday; 29 October 2017	13:10	Women's 5000 meter Men's 10.000 meter Women's 1000 meter Men's 1000 meter

== Medalists ==
=== Men ===
Distance	Gold		Silver		Bronze	
500m details	Dai Dai Ntab	34.67	Ronald Mulder	34.69	Kai Verbij	34.95
1000m details	Kai Verbij	1:08.30	Kjeld Nuis	1:08.52	Koen Verweij	1:08.96
1500m details	Koen Verweij	1:45.07	Thomas Krol	1:45.35	Sven Kramer	1:46.50
5000m details	Sven Kramer	6:16.15	Jorrit Bergsma	6:17.16	Erik Jan Kooiman	6:19.59
10000m details	Jorrit Bergsma	12:55.83	Sven Kramer	12:88.02	Erik Jan Kooiman	12:59.48

=== Women ===
Distance	Gold		Silver		Bronze	
500m details	Jorien ter Mors	38.51	Marrit Leenstra	38.88	Sanneke de Neeling	39.27
1000m details	Jorien ter Mors	1:15.94	Marrit Leenstra	1:16.18	Ireen Wüst	1:16.50
1500m details	Jorien ter Mors	1:54.93	Ireen Wüst	1:56.17	Marrit Leenstra	1:56.64
3000m details	Antoinette de Jong	4:05.59	Ireen Wüst	4:06.13	Irene Schouten	4:06.31
5000m details	Antoinette de Jong	6:59.65	Carien Kleibeuker	7:00.38	Carlijn Achtereekte	7:00.86
