= 2021 KNSB Dutch Single Distance Championships – Men's 1000 m =

Dutch speed skater

- Venue: Thialf, Heerenveen
- Dates: 1 November 2020
- Competitors: 19 skaters

Medalist men
1st place, gold medalist(s)		Thomas Krol	NED
2nd place, silver medalist(s)		Kai Verbij	NED
3rd place, bronze medalist(s)		Kjeld Nuis	NED

The men's 1000 meter at the 2021 KNSB Dutch Single Distance Championships took place in Heerenveen at the Thialf ice skating rink on Sunday 1 November 2020. There were 19 participants.

== Statistics ==
=== Result ===
Rank	Skater	Time
1st place, gold medalist(s)	Thomas Krol	1:08.02
2nd place, silver medalist(s)	Kai Verbij	1:08.17
3rd place, bronze medalist(s)	Kjeld Nuis	1:08.27
4	Hein Otterspeer	1:08.41
5	Wesly Dijs	1:08.67
6	Dai Dai N'tab	1:09.11(0)
7	Lennart Velema	1:09.11(3)
8	Louis Hollaar	1:09.57 PR
9	Gijs Esders	1:10.06
10	Serge Yoro	1:10.11 PR
11	Merijn Scheperkamp	1:10.17
12	Joost Van Dobbenburgh	1:10.24
13	Tijmen Snel	1:10.37
14	Jesper Hospes	1:10.56
15	Tjerk De Boer	1:10.81
16	Thomas Geerdinck	1:11.06
17	Tom Kant	1:11.07
18	Mika Van Essen	1:11.26
NC	Koen Verweij	DNS

Referee: Berri de Jonge. Assistant: Rieks van Lubek
Starter: Jan Rosing

=== Draw ===
Heat	Inside lane	Outside lane
1	Mika Van Essen	Merijn Scheperkamp
2	Joost Van Dobbenburgh	Louis Hollaar
3	Tjerk De Boer	Jesper Hospes
4	Serge Yoro	Thomas Geerdinck
5	Tijmen Snel	Dai Dai N'tab
6	Wesly Dijs	Tom Kant
7	Thomas Krol	Kai Verbij
8	Hein Otterspeer	Lennart Velema
