= 2018 KNSB Dutch Single Distance Championships – Men's 1000 m =

Dutch speed skater

- Venue: Thialf, Heerenveen
- Dates: 29 October 2017

Medalist men
1st place, gold medalist(s)		Kai Verbij	NED
2nd place, silver medalist(s)		Kjeld Nuis	NED
3rd place, bronze medalist(s)		Koen Verweij	NED

The men's 1000 meter at the 2018 KNSB Dutch Single Distance Championships took place in Heerenveen at the Thialf ice skating rink on Sunday 29 October 2017. There were 24 participants.

== Statistics ==
=== Result ===
Position	Skater	Heat	Lane	Time
1st place, gold medalist(s)	Kai Verbij	10	I	1:08.30
2nd place, silver medalist(s)	Kjeld Nuis	10	O	1:08.52
3rd place, bronze medalist(s)	Koen Verweij	8	O	1:08.96
4	Thomas Krol	12	I	1:09.22
5	Pim Schipper	9	I	1:09.46
6	Hein Otterspeer	12	O	1:09.49
7	Dai Dai Ntab	6	O	1:09.70 PR
8	Lucas van Alphen	11	I	1:09.79
9	Lennart Velema	7	I	1:09.95(0)
10	Michel Mulder	9	O	1:09.95(4)
11	Ronald Mulder	11	O	1:10.04
12	Martijn van Oosten	7	O	1:10.37
13	Jan Smeekens	6	I	1:10.40
14	Sjoerd de Vries	8	I	1:10.41
15	Gerben Jorritsma	5	I	1:10.56
16	Gijs Esders	3	I	1:10.59 PR
17	Aron Romeijn	4	I	1:10.84
18	Joost Born	5	O	1:10.98
19	Niek Deelstra	4	O	1:11.15
20	Tijmen Snel	2	I	1:11.34 PR
21	Jesper Hospes	1	I	1:11.45
22	Frerik Scheffer	1	O	1:12.01
23	Thijs Roozen	3	O	1:12.15
NC	Tom Kant	2	O	DNF

Referee: Berri de Jonge. Assistant: Ingrid Heijnsbroek
Starter: André de Vries
Start: 17:19hr. Finish: 17:47hr.

=== Draw ===
Heat	Inside lane	Outside lane
1	Jesper Hospes	Frerik Scheffer
2	Tijmen Snel	Tom Kant
3	Gijs Esders	Thijs Roozen
4	Aron Romeijn	Niek Deelstra
5	Gerben Jorritsma	Joost Born
6	Jan Smeekens	Dai Dai Ntab
7	Lennart Velema	Martijn van Oosten
8	Sjoerd de Vries	Koen Verweij
9	Pim Schipper	Michel Mulder
10	Kai Verbij	Kjeld Nuis
11	Lucas van Alphen	Ronald Mulder
12	Thomas Krol	Hein Otterspeer
