= 2018 KNSB Dutch Single Distance Championships – Men's 500 m =

Dutch speed skating competition

- Venue: Thialf, Heerenveen
- Dates: 28 October 2017

Medalist men
1st place, gold medalist(s)		Dai Dai N'tab	NED
2nd place, silver medalist(s)		Ronald Mulder	NED
3rd place, bronze medalist(s)		Kai Verbij	NED

The men's 500 meter at the 2018 KNSB Dutch Single Distance Championships took place in Heerenveen at the Thialf ice skating rink on Saturday 28 October 2017. There were 24 participants.

== Statistics ==
=== Result ===
Position	Skater	Heat	Lane	Time
1st place, gold medalist(s)	Dai Dai N'tab	12	I	34.67
2nd place, silver medalist(s)	Ronald Mulder	10	O	34.69
3rd place, bronze medalist(s)	Kai Verbij	11	I	34.95
4	Hein Otterspeer	8	I	35.13
5	Jan Smeekens	10	I	35.15
6	Aron Romeijn	4	I	35.36 PR
7	Kjeld Nuis	11	O	35.44
8	Jesper Hospes	8	O	35.52
9	Michel Mulder	12	O	35.58
10	Gerben Jorritsma	7	O	35.65(7)
11	Sjoerd de Vries	7	I	35.65(9)
12	Niek Deelstra	6	O	35.67
13	Martijn van Oosten	9	I	35.73
14	Gijs Esders	4	O	35.79(1) PR
15	Pim Schipper	9	O	35.79(7)
16	Joost Born	5	I	35.91
17	Thijs Govers	6	I	35.96 PR
18	Tijmen Snel	2	I	36.30 PR
19	Joost van Dobbenburgh	1	I	36.47 PR
20	Frerik Scheffer	3	I	36.48
21	Mark Nomden	1	O	36.53
22	Daan Baks	2	O	36.83
23	Joep Kalverdijk	3	O	36.89
NC	Lennart Velema	5	O	DQ
NC	Thomas Krol	WDR		

Referee: Berri de Jonge. Assistant: Ingrid Heijnsbroek
Starter: André de Vries
Start: 17:13 hr. Finish: 17:41 hr

=== Draw ===
Heat	Inside lane	Outside lane
1	Joost van Dobbenburgh	Mark Nomden
2	Tijmen Snel	Daan Baks
3	Frerik Scheffer	Joep Kalverdijk
4	Aron Romeijn	Gijs Esders
5	Joost Born	Lennart Velema
6	Thijs Govers	Niek Deelstra
7	Sjoerd de Vries	Gerben Jorritsma
8	Hein Otterspeer	Jesper Hospes
9	Martijn van Oosten	Pim Schipper
10	Jan Smeekens	Ronald Mulder
11	Kai Verbij	Kjeld Nuis
12	Dai Dai N'tab	Michel Mulder
