= 2023 European Speed Skating Championships =

International speed skating competition

- Venue: Vikingskipet, Hamar, Norway
- Dates: 6–8 January
- Competitors: 64 from 15 nations

Medalist men
1st place, gold medalist(s)		Patrick Roest	NED
1st place, gold medalist(s)		Merijn Scheperkamp	NED
2nd place, silver medalist(s)		Sander Eitrem	NOR
2nd place, silver medalist(s)		Hein Otterspeer	NED
3rd place, bronze medalist(s)		Bart Swings	BEL
3rd place, bronze medalist(s)		Marten Liiv	EST

Medalist women
1st place, gold medalist(s)		Antoinette Rijpma-de Jong	NED
1st place, gold medalist(s)		Jutta Leerdam	NED
2nd place, silver medalist(s)		Ragne Wiklund	NOR
2nd place, silver medalist(s)		Femke Kok	NED
3rd place, bronze medalist(s)		Marijke Groenewoud	NED
3rd place, bronze medalist(s)		Vanessa Herzog	AUT

The 2023 European Speed Skating Championships took place in Hamar, Norway from 6 to 8 January 2023.

== Medal summary ==
=== Medal table ===
* Host nation (Norway)

Rank	Nation	Gold	Silver	Bronze	Total
1	Netherlands	4	2	1	7
2	Norway*	0	2	0	2
3	Austria	0	0	1	1
3	Belgium	0	0	1	1
3	Estonia	0	0	1	1
Totals (5 entries)		4	4	4	12

=== Medalists ===
Event	Gold		Silver		Bronze	
Men's allround	Patrick Roest; Netherlands	147.961	Sander Eitrem; Norway	148.180	Bart Swings; Belgium	150.567
Women's allround	Antoinette Rijpma-de Jong; Netherlands	159.769	Ragne Wiklund; Norway	160.228	Marijke Groenewoud; Netherlands	160.506
Men's sprint	Merijn Scheperkamp; Netherlands	139.050	Hein Otterspeer; Netherlands	139.290	Marten Liiv; Estonia	139.410
Women's sprint	Jutta Leerdam; Netherlands	149.960	Femke Kok; Netherlands	151.290	Vanessa Herzog; Austria	153.395

== Allround ==
=== Men's championships ===
==== 500 m ====
Rank	Pair	Lane	Name	Nat.	Time	Diff	Points
1	7	o	Patrick Roest	(Netherlands)	36.45		36.450
2	5	o	Peder Kongshaug	(Norway)	36.55	+0.10	36.550
3	1	i	Sander Eitrem	(Norway)	36.94	+0.49	36.940
4	4	i	Bart Swings	(Belgium)	37.00	+0.55	37.000
5	7	i	Szymon Palka	(Poland)	37.44	+0.99	37.440
6	6	o	Marcel Bosker	(Netherlands)	37.55	+1.10	37.550
7	2	o	Mathieu Belloir	(France)	37.97	+1.52	37.970
8	5	i	Beau Snellink	(Netherlands)	38.03	+1.58	38.030
9	3	i	Sigurd Henriksen	(Norway)	38.26	+1.81	38.260
10	3	o	Wilhelm Ekensskär	(Sweden)	38.27	+1.82	38.270
11	2	i	Konstantin Götze	(Germany)	38.32	+1.87	38.320
12	1	o	Davide Ghiotto	(Italy)	38.41	+1.96	38.410
13	4	o	Timothy Loubineaud	(France)	38.61	+2.16	38.610
	6	i	Gabriel Odor	(Austria)	Disqualified		

==== 5000 m ====
Rank	Pair	Lane	Name	Nat.	Time	Diff	Points
1	7	i	Sander Eitrem	(Norway)	6:12.15		37.215
2	5	o	Patrick Roest	(Netherlands)	6:13.31	+1.16	37.331
3	6	i	Davide Ghiotto	(Italy)	6:16.85	+4.70	37.685
4	7	o	Beau Snellink	(Netherlands)	6:17.13	+4.98	37.713
5	3	o	Bart Swings	(Belgium)	6:20.78	+8.63	38.078
6	3	i	Marcel Bosker	(Netherlands)	6:22.33	+10.18	38.233
7	5	i	Sigurd Henriksen	(Norway)	6:26.23	+14.08	38.623
8	6	o	Peder Kongshaug	(Norway)	6:26.58	+14.43	38.658
9	4	o	Gabriel Odor	(Austria)	6:37.97	+25.82	39.797
10	4	i	Timothy Loubineaud	(France)	6:42.40	+30.25	40.240
11	2	i	Szymon Palka	(Poland)	6:43.49	+31.34	40.349
12	2	o	Mathieu Belloir	(France)	6:51.52	+39.37	41.152
13	1	i	Konstantin Götze	(Germany)	6:52.82	+40.67	41.282
14	1	o	Wilhelm Ekensskär	(Sweden)	7:05.91	+53.76	42.591

==== 1500 m ====
Rank	Pair	Lane	Name	Nat.	Time	Diff	Points
1	7	o	Sander Eitrem	(Norway)	1:44.44		34.813
2	7	i	Patrick Roest	(Netherlands)	1:45.83	+1.39	35.276
3	6	o	Peder Kongshaug	(Norway)	1:46.01	+1.57	35.336
4	6	i	Bart Swings	(Belgium)	1:46.03	+1.59	35.343
5	5	o	Marcel Bosker	(Netherlands)	1:47.24	+2.80	35.746
6	4	i	Davide Ghiotto	(Italy)	1:48.66	+4.22	36.220
7	1	o	Gabriel Odor	(Austria)	1:48.78	+4.34	36.260
8	5	i	Beau Snellink	(Netherlands)	1:49.01	+4.57	36.336
9	4	o	Sigurd Henriksen	(Norway)	1:49.92	+5.48	36.640
10	3	i	Szymon Palka	(Poland)	1:50.29	+5.85	36.763
11	2	i	Mathieu Belloir	(France)	1:50.51	+6.07	36.836
12	2	o	Konstantin Götze	(Germany)	1:52.39	+7.95	37.463
13	1	i	Wilhelm Ekensskär	(Sweden)	1:53.15	+8.71	37.716
14	3	o	Timothy Loubineaud	(France)	1:55.12	+10.68	38.373

==== 10,000 m ====
Rank	Pair	Lane	Name	Nat.	Time	Diff	Points
1	4	o	Patrick Roest	(Netherlands)	12:58.09		38.904
2	1	i	Davide Ghiotto	(Italy)	13:00.09	+2.00	39.004
3	4	i	Sander Eitrem	(Norway)	13:04.24	+6.15	39.212
4	2	o	Beau Snellink	(Netherlands)	13:08.52	+10.43	39.426
5	3	i	Bart Swings	(Belgium)	13:22.92	+24.83	40.146
6	1	o	Sigurd Henriksen	(Norway)	13:22.96	+24.87	40.148
7	2	i	Marcel Bosker	(Netherlands)	13:26.73	+28.64	40.336
8	3	o	Peder Kongshaug	(Norway)	13:38.64	+40.55	40.932

==== Final ranking ====
Rank	Skater	Nation	500 m	5000 m	1500 m	10,000 m	Points	Behind
1st place, gold medalist(s)	Patrick Roest	Netherlands	36.45 (1)	6:13.31 (2)	1:45.83 (2)	12:58.09 (1)	147.961	
2nd place, silver medalist(s)	Sander Eitrem	Norway	36.94 (3)	6:12.15 (1)	1:44.44 (1)	13:04.24 (3)	148.180	+4.38
3rd place, bronze medalist(s)	Bart Swings	Belgium	37.00 (4)	6:20.78 (5)	1:46.03 (4)	13:22.92 (5)	150.567	+52.12
4	Davide Ghiotto	Italy	38.41 (12)	6:16.85 (3)	1:48.66 (6)	13:00.09 (2)	151.319	+1:07.16
5	Peder Kongshaug	Norway	36.55 (2)	6:26.58 (8)	1:46.01 (3)	13:38.64 (8)	151.476	+1:10.30
6	Beau Snellink	Netherlands	38.03 (8)	6:17.13 (4)	1:49.01 (8)	13:08.52 (4)	151.505	+1:10.88
7	Marcel Bosker	Netherlands	37.55 (6)	6:22.33 (6)	1:47.24 (5)	13:26.73 (7)	151.865	+1:18.08
8	Sigurd Henriksen	Norway	38.26 (9)	6:26.23 (7)	1:49.92 (9)	13:22.96 (6)	153.671	+1:54.20
9	Szymon Palka	Poland	37.44 (5)	6:43.49 (11)	1:50.29 (10)	—	114.552	—
10	Mathieu Belloir	France	37.97 (7)	6:51.52 (12)	1:50.51 (11)	—	115.958	—
11	Konstantin Götze	Germany	38.32 (11)	6:52.82 (13)	1:52.39 (12)	—	117.065	—
12	Timothy Loubineaud	France	38.61 (13)	6:42.40 (10)	1:55.12 (14)	—	117.223	—
13	Wilhelm Ekensskär	Sweden	38.27 (10)	7:05.91 (14)	1:53.15 (13)	—	118.577	—
	Gabriel Odor	Austria	DQ	6:37.97 (9)	1:48.78 (7)	—		

=== Women's championships ===
==== 500 m ====
Rank	Pair	Lane	Name	Nat.	Time	Diff	Points
1	7	o	Antoinette Rijpma-de Jong	(Netherlands)	38.55		38.550
2	7	i	Marijke Groenewoud	(Netherlands)	39.03	+0.48	39.030
3	8	o	Robin Groot	(Netherlands)	39.72	+1.17	39.720
4	2	o	Ragne Wiklund	(Norway)	39.76	+1.21	39.760
5	1	i	Sandrine Tas	(Belgium)	40.35	+1.80	40.350
6	6	o	Laura Peveri	(Italy)	40.47	+1.92	40.470
7	5	i	Veronika Antošová	(Czech Republic)	40.86	+2.31	40.860
8	4	i	Michelle Uhrig	(Germany)	40.94	+2.39	40.940
9	8	i	Aurora Løvås	(Norway)	41.20	+2.65	41.200
10	6	i	Olga Kaczmarek	(Poland)	41.23	+2.68	41.230
11	4	o	Eva Lagrange	(Sweden)	41.67	+3.12	41.670
12	2	i	Marlen Ehseluns	(Germany)	42.06	+3.51	42.060
13	5	o	Sofie Karoline Haugen	(Norway)	42.41	+3.86	42.410
14	3	i	Magdalena Czyszczoń	(Poland)	42.51	+3.96	42.510
15	3	o	Zuzana Kuršová	(Czech Republic)	43.08	+4.53	43.080

==== 3000 m ====
Rank	Pair	Lane	Name	Nat.	Time	Diff	Points
1	6	i	Ragne Wiklund	(Norway)	3:59.92		39.986
2	6	o	Antoinette Rijpma-de Jong	(Netherlands)	4:01.40	+1.48	40.233
3	7	i	Marijke Groenewoud	(Netherlands)	4:04.18	+4.26	40.696
4	8	i	Robin Groot	(Netherlands)	4:09.40	+9.48	41.566
5	5	o	Sofie Karoline Haugen	(Norway)	4:15.05	+15.13	42.508
6	4	o	Laura Peveri	(Italy)	4:16.36	+16.44	42.726
7	8	o	Magdalena Czyszczoń	(Poland)	4:17.66	+17.74	42.943
8	3	o	Michelle Uhrig	(Germany)	4:20.46	+20.54	43.410
9	2	i	Eva Lagrange	(Sweden)	4:21.24	+21.32	43.540
10	3	i	Aurora Løvås	(Norway)	4:27.76	+27.84	44.626
11	1	i	Veronika Antošová	(Czech Republic)	4:28.81	+28.89	44.801
12	2	o	Marlen Ehseluns	(Germany)	4:33.63	+33.71	45.605
13	5	i	Olga Kaczmarek	(Poland)	4:34.62	+34.70	45.770
14	4	i	Zuzana Kuršová	(Czech Republic)	4:35.24	+35.32	45.873
	7	o	Sandrine Tas	(Belgium)	Did not start		

==== 1500 m ====
Rank	Pair	Lane	Name	Nat.	Time	Diff	Points
1	7	i	Antoinette Rijpma-de Jong	(Netherlands)	1:55.39		38.463
2	7	o	Marijke Groenewoud	(Netherlands)	1:55.66	+0.27	38.553
3	6	i	Ragne Wiklund	(Norway)	1:56.29	+0.90	38.763
4	6	o	Robin Groot	(Netherlands)	1:58.57	+3.18	39.523
5	5	i	Laura Peveri	(Italy)	2:02.27	+6.88	40.756
6	3	i	Magdalena Czyszczoń	(Poland)	2:02.73	+7.34	40.910
7	5	o	Michelle Uhrig	(Germany)	2:03.86	+8.47	41.286
8	4	i	Sofie Karoline Haugen	(Norway)	2:04.12	+8.73	41.373
9	4	o	Eva Lagrange	(Sweden)	2:04.42	+9.03	41.473
10	2	i	Aurora Løvås	(Norway)	2:05.58	+10.19	41.860
11	3	o	Veronika Antošová	(Czech Republic)	2:05.65	+10.26	41.883
12	1	i	Marlen Ehseluns	(Germany)	2:09.06	+13.67	43.020
13	2	o	Zuzana Kuršová	(Czech Republic)	2:11.65	+16.26	43.883
	8	i	Olga Kaczmarek	(Poland)	Did not start		

==== 5000 m ====
Rank	Pair	Lane	Name	Nat.	Time	Diff	Points
1	3	i	Ragne Wiklund	(Norway)	6:57.19		41.719
2	4	o	Marijke Groenewoud	(Netherlands)	7:02.27	+5.08	42.227
3	4	i	Antoinette Rijpma-de Jong	(Netherlands)	7:05.23	+8.04	42.533
4	3	o	Robin Groot	(Netherlands)	7:11.52	+14.33	43.142
5	1	o	Magdalena Czyszczoń	(Poland)	7:15.04	+17.85	43.554
6	1	i	Sofie Karoline Haugen	(Norway)	7:17.04	+19.85	43.764
7	2	i	Laura Peveri	(Italy)	7:27.35	+30.16	44.775
8	2	o	Michelle Uhrig	(Germany)	7:39.81	+42.62	45.981

==== Final ranking ====
Rank	Skater	Nation	500 m	3000 m	1500 m	5000 m	Points	Behind
1st place, gold medalist(s)	Antoinette Rijpma-de Jong	Netherlands	38.55 (1)	4:01.40 (2)	1:55.39 (1)	7:05.23 (3)	159.769	
2nd place, silver medalist(s)	Ragne Wiklund	Norway	39.76 (4)	3:59.92 (1)	1:56.29 (3)	6:57.19 (1)	160.228	+4.59
3rd place, bronze medalist(s)	Marijke Groenewoud	Netherlands	39.03 (2)	4:04.18 (3)	1:55.66 (2)	7:02.27 (2)	160.506	+7.37
4	Robin Groot	Netherlands	39.72 (3)	4:09.40 (4)	1:58.57 (4)	7:11.52 (4)	163.961	+41.92
5	Laura Peveri	Italy	40.47 (6)	4:16.36 (6)	2:02.27 (5)	7:27.35 (7)	168.687	+1:29.18
6	Magdalena Czyszczoń	Poland	42.51 (14)	4:17.66 (7)	2:02.73 (6)	7:15.04 (5)	169.867	+1:40.98
7	Sofie Karoline Haugen	Norway	42.41 (13)	4:15.05 (5)	2:04.12 (8)	7:17.04 (6)	169.995	+1:42.26
8	Michelle Uhrig	Germany	40.94 (8)	4:20.46 (8)	2:03.86 (7)	7:39.81 (8)	171.617	+1:58.48
9	Eva Lagrange	Sweden	41.67 (11)	4:21.24 (9)	2:04.42 (9)	—	126.683	—
10	Veronika Antošová	Czech Republic	40.86 (7)	4:28.81 (11)	2:05.65 (11)	—	127.544	—
11	Aurora Løvås	Norway	41.20 (9)	4:27.76 (10)	2:05.58 (10)	—	127.686	—
12	Marlen Ehseluns	Germany	42.06 (12)	4:33.63 (12)	2:09.06 (12)	—	130.685	—
13	Zuzana Kuršová	Czech Republic	43.08 (15)	4:35.24 (14)	2:11.65 (13)	—	132.836	—
	Olga Kaczmarek	Poland	41.23 (10)	4:34.62 (13)	WDR	—		
	Sandrine Tas	Belgium	40.35 (5)	WDR	—			

== Sprint ==
=== Men's championships ===
==== 1st 500 m ====
Rank	Pair	Lane	Name	Nat.	Time	Diff	Points
1	8	o	David Bosa	(Italy)	35.02		35.020
2	8	i	Merijn Scheperkamp	(Netherlands)	35.04	+0.02	35.040
3	5	o	Marten Liiv	(Estonia)	35.06	+0.04	35.060
4	5	i	Kai Verbij	(Netherlands)	35.11	+0.09	35.110
5	10	o	Hein Otterspeer	(Netherlands)	35.12	+0.10	35.120
6	10	i	Piotr Michalski	(Poland)	35.20	+0.18	35.200
7	9	i	Nil Llop	(Spain)	35.41	+0.39	35.410
8	9	o	Damian Żurek	(Poland)	35.42	+0.40	35.420
9	6	i	Håvard Holmefjord Lorentzen	(Norway)	35.45	+0.43	35.450
10	7	o	Henrik Fagerli Rukke	(Norway)	35.48	+0.46	35.480
11	7	i	Moritz Klein	(Germany)	35.62	+0.60	35.620
12	3	i	Hendrik Dombek	(Germany)	35.77	+0.75	35.770
13	4	o	Odin By Farstad	(Norway)	35.87	+0.85	35.870
14	4	i	Cornelius Kersten	(United Kingdom)	36.23	+1.21	36.230
15	2	i	Jakub Piotrowski	(Poland)	36.28	+1.26	36.280
16	1	o	Stefan Emele	(Germany)	36.30	+1.28	36.300
17	2	o	Alessio Trentini	(Italy)	36.32	+1.30	36.320
18	1	i	Samuli Suomalainen	(Finland)	36.77	+1.75	36.770
19	3	o	Ignaz Gschwentner	(Austria)	37.08	+2.06	37.080
	6	o	Mathias Vosté	(Belgium)	Disqualified		

==== 1st 1000 m ====
Rank	Pair	Lane	Name	Nat.	Time	Diff	Points
1	8	o	Hein Otterspeer	(Netherlands)	1:08.32		34.160
2	5	o	Merijn Scheperkamp	(Netherlands)	1:08.76	+0.44	34.380
3	8	i	Marten Liiv	(Estonia)	1:09.00	+0.68	34.500
4	10	o	Kai Verbij	(Netherlands)	1:09.05	+0.73	34.525
5	10	i	Håvard Holmefjord Lorentzen	(Norway)	1:09.38	+1.06	34.690
6	7	i	Mathias Vosté	(Belgium)	1:09.65	+1.33	34.825
7	5	i	Nil Llop	(Spain)	1:09.73	+1.41	34.865
8	9	i	David Bosa	(Italy)	1:09.74	+1.42	34.870
9	6	o	Hendrik Dombek	(Germany)	1:09.93	+1.61	34.965
10	4	i	Stefan Emele	(Germany)	1:10.02	+1.70	35.010
11	7	o	Cornelius Kersten	(United Kingdom)	1:10.07	+1.75	35.035
12	4	o	Piotr Michalski	(Poland)	1:10.17	+1.85	35.085
13	3	o	Odin By Farstad	(Norway)	1:10.23	+1.91	35.115
14	6	i	Damian Żurek	(Poland)	1:10.27	+1.95	35.135
15	9	o	Moritz Klein	(Germany)	1:10.35	+2.03	35.175
16	3	i	Alessio Trentini	(Italy)	1:10.39	+2.07	35.195
17	2	o	Henrik Fagerli Rukke	(Norway)	1:10.43	+2.11	35.215
18	2	i	Samuli Suomalainen	(Finland)	1:11.52	+3.20	35.760
19	1	o	Jakub Piotrowski	(Poland)	1:11.74	+3.42	35.870
20	1	i	Ignaz Gschwentner	(Austria)	1:14.09	+5.77	37.045

==== 2nd 500 m ====
Rank	Pair	Lane	Name	Nat.	Time	Diff	Points
1	10	o	Merijn Scheperkamp	(Netherlands)	35.13		35.130
2	9	i	Marten Liiv	(Estonia)	35.23	+0.10	35.230
3	9	o	Kai Verbij	(Netherlands)	35.28	+0.15	35.280
4	8	i	David Bosa	(Italy)	35.30	+0.17	35.300
5	6	o	Piotr Michalski	(Poland)	35.31	+0.18	35.310
6	7	o	Nil Llop	(Spain)	35.45	+0.32	35.450
7	8	o	Håvard Holmefjord Lorentzen	(Norway)	35.46	+0.33	35.460
8	6	i	Henrik Fagerli Rukke	(Norway)	35.51	+0.38	35.510
9	7	i	Damian Żurek	(Poland)	35.53	+0.40	35.530
10	5	o	Hendrik Dombek	(Germany)	35.58	+0.45	35.580
11	10	i	Hein Otterspeer	(Netherlands)	35.68	+0.55	35.680
12	4	o	Moritz Klein	(Germany)	35.73	+0.60	35.730
13	1	i	Mathias Vosté	(Belgium)	35.92	+0.79	35.920
14	5	i	Odin By Farstad	(Norway)	35.94	+0.81	35.940
15	3	o	Cornelius Kersten	(United Kingdom)	36.06	+0.93	36.060
16	4	i	Stefan Emele	(Germany)	36.21	+1.08	36.210
17	3	i	Alessio Trentini	(Italy)	36.39	+1.26	36.390
18	2	o	Jakub Piotrowski	(Poland)	36.42	+1.29	36.420
19	1	o	Samuli Suomalainen	(Finland)	36.78	+1.65	36.780
20	2	i	Ignaz Gschwentner	(Austria)	36.99	+1.86	36.990

==== 2nd 1000 m ====
Rank	Pair	Lane	Name	Nat.	Time	Diff	Points
1	8	i	Hein Otterspeer	(Netherlands)	1:08.66		34.330
2	10	i	Merijn Scheperkamp	(Netherlands)	1:09.00	+0.34	34.500
3	10	o	Marten Liiv	(Estonia)	1:09.24	+0.58	34.620
4	9	i	Kai Verbij	(Netherlands)	1:09.34	+0.68	34.670
5	4	i	Moritz Klein	(Germany)	1:09.52	+0.86	34.760
6	7	o	Nil Llop	(Spain)	1:09.79	+1.13	34.895
7	9	o	David Bosa	(Italy)	1:09.81	+1.15	34.905
8	6	o	Damian Żurek	(Poland)	1:09.84	+1.18	34.920
9	3	i	Odin By Farstad	(Norway)	1:09.95	+1.29	34.975
10	6	i	Henrik Fagerli Rukke	(Norway)	1:09.99	+1.33	34.995
11	8	o	Håvard Holmefjord Lorentzen	(Norway)	1:09.99	+1.33	34.995
12	7	i	Piotr Michalski	(Poland)	1:10.05	+1.39	35.025
13	5	i	Hendrik Dombek	(Germany)	1:10.16	+1.50	35.080
14	5	o	Stefan Emele	(Germany)	1:10.21	+1.55	35.105
15	4	o	Alessio Trentini	(Italy)	1:10.24	+1.58	35.120
16	2	i	Cornelius Kersten	(United Kingdom)	1:10.60	+1.94	35.300
17	3	o	Samuli Suomalainen	(Finland)	1:11.45	+2.79	35.725
18	1	i	Jakub Piotrowski	(Poland)	1:11.92	+3.26	35.960
19	2	o	Ignaz Gschwentner	(Austria)	1:13.56	+4.90	36.780

==== Final ranking ====
Rank	Skater	Nation	500 m	1000 m	500 m	1000 m	Points	Behind
1st place, gold medalist(s)	Merijn Scheperkamp	Netherlands	35.04 (2)	1:08.76 (2)	35.13 (1)	1:09.00 (2)	139.050	
2nd place, silver medalist(s)	Hein Otterspeer	Netherlands	35.12 (5)	1:08.32 (1)	35.68 (11)	1:08.66 (1)	139.290	+0.48
3rd place, bronze medalist(s)	Marten Liiv	Estonia	35.06 (3)	1:09.00 (3)	35.23 (2)	1:09.24 (3)	139.410	+0.72
4	Kai Verbij	Netherlands	35.11 (4)	1:09.05 (4)	35.28 (3)	1:09.34 (4)	139.585	+1.07
5	David Bosa	Italy	35.02 (1)	1:09.74 (8)	35.30 (4)	1:09.81 (7)	140.095	+2.09
6	Håvard Holmefjord Lorentzen	Norway	35.45 (9)	1:09.38 (5)	35.46 (7)	1:09.99 (11)	140.595	+3.09
7	Nil Llop	Spain	35.41 (7)	1:09.73 (7)	35.45 (6)	1:09.79 (6)	140.620	+3.14
7	Piotr Michalski	Poland	35.20 (6)	1:10.17 (12)	35.31 (5)	1:10.05 (12)	140.620	+3.14
9	Damian Żurek	Poland	35.42 (8)	1:10.27 (14)	35.53 (9)	1:09.84 (8)	141.005	+3.91
10	Henrik Fagerli Rukke	Norway	35.48 (10)	1:10.43 (17)	35.51 (8)	1:09.99 (10)	141.200	+4.30
11	Moritz Klein	Germany	35.62 (11)	1:10.35 (15)	35.73 (12)	1:09.52 (5)	141.285	+4.47
12	Hendrik Dombek	Germany	35.77 (12)	1:09.93 (9)	35.58 (10)	1:10.16 (13)	141.395	+4.69
13	Odin By Farstad	Norway	35.87 (13)	1:10.23 (13)	35.94 (14)	1:09.95 (9)	141.900	+5.70
14	Stefan Emele	Germany	36.30 (16)	1:10.02 (10)	36.21 (16)	1:10.21 (14)	142.625	+7.15
14	Cornelius Kersten	Great Britain	36.23 (14)	1:10.07 (11)	36.06 (15)	1:10.60 (16)	142.625	+7.15
16	Alessio Trentini	Italy	36.32 (17)	1:10.39 (16)	36.39 (17)	1:10.24 (15)	143.025	+7.95
17	Jakub Piotrowski	Poland	36.28 (15)	1:11.74 (19)	36.42 (18)	1:11.92 (18)	144.530	+10.96
18	Samuli Suomalainen	Finland	36.77 (18)	1:11.52 (18)	36.78 (19)	1:11.45 (17)	145.035	+11.97
19	Ignaz Gschwentner	Austria	37.08 (19)	1:14.09 (20)	36.99 (20)	1:13.56 (19)	147.895	+17.69
	Mathias Vosté	Belgium	DQ	1:09.65 (6)	35.92 (13)	—		

=== Women's championships ===
==== 1st 500 m ====
Rank	Pair	Lane	Name	Nat.	Time	Diff	Points
1	7	i	Femke Kok	(Netherlands)	37.55		37.550
2	7	o	Jutta Leerdam	(Netherlands)	37.61	+0.06	37.610
3	8	i	Vanessa Herzog	(Austria)	38.15	+0.60	38.150
4	8	o	Marrit Fledderus	(Netherlands)	38.20	+0.65	38.200
5	4	i	Karolina Bosiek	(Poland)	38.87	+1.32	38.870
6	6	o	Andżelika Wójcik	(Poland)	38.91	+1.36	38.910
7	4	o	Ellia Smeding	(United Kingdom)	38.99	+1.44	38.990
8	6	i	Martine Ripsrud	(Norway)	39.01	+1.46	39.010
9	3	o	Isabelle van Elst	(Belgium)	39.13	+1.58	39.130
10	5	i	Serena Pergher	(Italy)	39.26	+1.71	39.260
11	5	o	Julie Nistad Samsonsen	(Norway)	39.31	+1.76	39.310
12	3	i	Luisa González	(Spain)	39.76	+2.21	39.760
13	1	i	Mihaela Hogaș	(Romania)	39.91	+2.36	39.910
14	2	i	Lea Sophie Scholz	(Germany)	39.95	+2.40	39.950
15	2	o	Iga Wojtasik	(Poland)	39.95	+2.40	39.950

==== 1st 1000 m ====
Rank	Pair	Lane	Name	Nat.	Time	Diff	Points
1	7	i	Jutta Leerdam	(Netherlands)	1:14.38		37.190
2	6	o	Femke Kok	(Netherlands)	1:15.68	+1.30	37.840
3	7	o	Vanessa Herzog	(Austria)	1:16.80	+2.42	38.400
4	4	i	Karolina Bosiek	(Poland)	1:17.30	+2.92	38.650
5	6	i	Ellia Smeding	(United Kingdom)	1:17.36	+2.98	38.680
6	8	i	Marrit Fledderus	(Netherlands)	1:17.41	+3.03	38.705
7	8	o	Martine Ripsrud	(Norway)	1:17.96	+3.58	38.980
8	3	i	Isabelle van Elst	(Belgium)	1:18.37	+3.99	39.185
9	3	o	Andżelika Wójcik	(Poland)	1:18.75	+4.37	39.375
10	5	o	Lea Sophie Scholz	(Germany)	1:18.89	+4.51	39.445
11	5	i	Julie Nistad Samsonsen	(Norway)	1:19.72	+5.34	39.860
12	2	i	Iga Wojtasik	(Poland)	1:20.79	+6.41	40.395
13	4	o	Mihaela Hogaș	(Romania)	1:20.94	+6.56	40.470
14	1	i	Serena Pergher	(Italy)	1:21.84	+7.46	40.920
15	2	o	Luisa González	(Spain)	1:21.88	+7.50	40.940

==== 2nd 500 m ====
Rank	Pair	Lane	Name	Nat.	Time	Diff	Points
1	8	i	Jutta Leerdam	(Netherlands)	37.76		37.760
2	8	o	Femke Kok	(Netherlands)	37.87	+0.11	37.870
3	7	o	Vanessa Herzog	(Austria)	38.25	+0.49	38.250
4	7	i	Marrit Fledderus	(Netherlands)	38.53	+0.77	38.530
5	5	i	Andżelika Wójcik	(Poland)	38.72	+0.96	38.720
6	3	o	Serena Pergher	(Italy)	38.92	+1.16	38.920
7	6	o	Karolina Bosiek	(Poland)	39.02	+1.26	39.020
8	6	i	Ellia Smeding	(United Kingdom)	39.17	+1.41	39.170
9	3	i	Julie Nistad Samsonsen	(Norway)	39.27	+1.51	39.270
10	4	i	Isabelle van Elst	(Belgium)	39.33	+1.57	39.330
11	2	o	Mihaela Hogaș	(Romania)	39.69	+1.93	39.690
12	2	i	Iga Wojtasik	(Poland)	39.85	+2.09	39.850
13	4	o	Lea Sophie Scholz	(Germany)	40.11	+2.35	40.110
14	1	o	Luisa González	(Spain)	40.24	+2.48	40.240
	5	o	Martine Ripsrud	(Norway)	Did not start		

==== 2nd 1000 m ====
Rank	Pair	Lane	Name	Nat.	Time	Diff	Points
1	8	o	Jutta Leerdam	(Netherlands)	1:14.80		37.400
2	8	i	Femke Kok	(Netherlands)	1:16.06	+1.26	38.030
3	5	o	Ellia Smeding	(United Kingdom)	1:17.13	+2.33	38.565
4	6	o	Karolina Bosiek	(Poland)	1:17.17	+2.37	38.585
5	7	i	Vanessa Herzog	(Austria)	1:17.19	+2.39	38.595
6	7	o	Marrit Fledderus	(Netherlands)	1:17.39	+2.59	38.695
7	4	o	Isabelle van Elst	(Belgium)	1:17.66	+2.86	38.830
8	6	i	Andżelika Wójcik	(Poland)	1:18.50	+3.70	39.250
9	5	i	Lea Sophie Scholz	(Germany)	1:18.95	+4.15	39.475
10	3	o	Julie Nistad Samsonsen	(Norway)	1:19.67	+4.87	39.835
11	1	o	Iga Wojtasik	(Poland)	1:20.36	+5.56	40.180
12	4	i	Mihaela Hogaș	(Romania)	1:20.55	+5.75	40.275
13	2	o	Serena Pergher	(Italy)	1:20.74	+5.94	40.370
14	3	i	Luisa González	(Spain)	1:20.89	+6.09	40.445

==== Final ranking ====
Rank	Skater	Nation	500 m	1000 m	500 m	1000 m	Points	Behind
1st place, gold medalist(s)	Jutta Leerdam	Netherlands	37.61 (2)	1:14.38 (1)	37.76 (1)	1:14.80 (1)	149.960	
2nd place, silver medalist(s)	Femke Kok	Netherlands	37.55 (1)	1:15.68 (2)	37.87 (2)	1:16.06 (2)	151.290	+2.66
3rd place, bronze medalist(s)	Vanessa Herzog	Austria	38.15 (3)	1:16.80 (3)	38.25 (3)	1:17.19 (5)	153.395	+6.87
4	Marrit Fledderus	Netherlands	38.20 (4)	1:17.41 (6)	38.53 (4)	1:17.39 (6)	154.130	+8.34
5	Karolina Bosiek	Poland	38.87 (5)	1:17.30 (4)	39.02 (7)	1:17.17 (4)	155.125	+10.33
6	Ellia Smeding	Great Britain	38.99 (7)	1:17.36 (5)	39.17 (8)	1:17.13 (3)	155.405	+10.89
7	Andżelika Wójcik	Poland	38.91 (6)	1:18.75 (9)	38.72 (5)	1:18.50 (8)	156.255	+12.59
8	Isabelle van Elst	Belgium	39.13 (9)	1:18.37 (8)	39.33 (10)	1:17.66 (7)	156.475	+13.03
9	Julie Nistad Samsonsen	Norway	39.31 (11)	1:19.72 (11)	39.27 (9)	1:19.67 (10)	158.275	+16.63
10	Lea Sophie Scholz	Germany	39.95 (14)	1:18.89 (10)	40.11 (13)	1:18.95 (9)	158.980	+18.04
11	Serena Pergher	Italy	39.26 (10)	1:21.84 (14)	38.92 (6)	1:20.74 (13)	159.470	+19.02
12	Mihaela Hogaș	Romania	39.91 (13)	1:20.94 (13)	39.69 (11)	1:20.55 (12)	160.345	+20.77
13	Iga Wojtasik	Poland	39.95 (15)	1:20.79 (12)	39.85 (12)	1:20.36 (11)	160.375	+20.83
14	Luisa González	Spain	39.76 (12)	1:21.88 (15)	40.24 (14)	1:20.89 (14)	161.385	+22.85
	Martine Ripsrud	Norway	39.01 (8)	1:17.96 (7)	WDR	—		
