= 2020 KNSB Dutch Single Distance Championships – Men's 1000 m =

- Venue: Thialf, Heerenveen
- Dates: 29 December 2019
- Competitors: 22 skaters

Medalist men
1st place, gold medalist(s)		Thomas Krol	NED
2nd place, silver medalist(s)		Kai Verbij	NED
3rd place, bronze medalist(s)		Dai Dai Ntab	NED

The men's 1000 meter at the 2020 KNSB Dutch Single Distance Championships took place in Heerenveen at the Thialf ice skating rink on Sunday 29 December 2019. There were 22 participants.

== Statistics ==
=== Result ===
Position	Skater	Time
1st place, gold medalist(s)	Thomas Krol	1:08.35
2nd place, silver medalist(s)	Kai Verbij	1:08.53
3rd place, bronze medalist(s)	Dai Dai Ntab	1:08.87
4	Lennart Velema	1:09.23
5	Koen Verweij	1:09.26
6	Wesly Dijs	1:09.50 PR
7	Ronald Mulder	1:09.65
8	Thomas Geerdinck	1:09.80 PR
9	Tijmen Snel	1:09.84
10	Gijs Esders	1:10.08
11	Merijn Scheperkamp	1:10.24
12	Joost van Dobbenburgh	1:10.29
13	Tom Kant	1:10.55
14	Gerben Jorritsma	1:10.76
15	Janno Botman	1:10.96
16	Jesper Hospes	1:11.27
17	Serge Yoro	1:11.31
18	Aron Romeijn	1:11.45
19	Kai in 't Veld	1:11.51 PR
20	Jarle Gerrits	1:12.60
NC	Joep Kalverdijk	DQ
NC	Hein Otterspeer	DQ

Referee: Hanjo Heideman. Assistant: Wil Schildwacht
Starter: Janny Smegen
Start: 16:41 hr. Finish: 17:13 hr.

=== Draw ===
Heat	Inside lane	Outside lane
1	Joep Kalverdijk	Jarle Gerrits
2	Jesper Hospes	Serge Yoro
3	Joost van Dobbenburgh	Kai in 't Veld
4	Merijn Scheperkamp	Thomas Geerdinck
5	Ronald Mulder	Aron Romeijn
6	Gerben Jorritsma	Tijmen Snel
7	Janno Botman	Koen Verweij
8	Tom Kant	Wesly Dijs
9	Kai Verbij	Gijs Esders
10	Lennart Velema	Thomas Krol
11	Hein Otterspeer	Dai Dai Ntab
