= 2022 KNSB Dutch Sprint Championships =

Dutch speed skating competition

KNSB Dutch Sprint Championships
- Competitors: 20 men 20women

Medalist men
1st place, gold medalist(s)		Tijmen Snel	NED
2nd place, silver medalist(s)		Janno Botman	NED
3rd place, bronze medalist(s)		Serge Yoro	NED

Medalist women
1st place, gold medalist(s)		Michelle de Jong	NED
2nd place, silver medalist(s)		Marrit Fledderus	NED
3rd place, bronze medalist(s)		Helga Drost	NED

The 2022 KNSB Dutch Sprint Championships in speed skating were held in Heerenveen at the Thialf ice skating rink from 22 January to 23 January 2022. The tournament was part of the 2021–2022 speed skating season. Tijmen Snel and Michelle de Jong won the sprint titles. The sprint championships were held at the same time as the 2022 KNSB Dutch Allround Championships.

== Schedule ==
Saturday 22 January 2022	Sunday 23 January 2022
500 meter women sprint 1st run 500 meter men sprint 1st run 1000 meter women sprint 1st run 1000 meter men sprint 1st run	500 meter women sprint 2nd run 500 meter men sprint 2nd run 1000 meter women sprint 2nd run 1000 meter men sprint 2nd run

== Medalist ==
Event	Gold		Silver		Bronze	
Women's Sprint overall	Michelle de Jong	152.090	Marrit Fledderus	153.120	Helga Drost	153.495
Men's Sprint overall	Tijmen Snel	139.015	Janno Botman	139.905	Serge Yoro	140.010

=== Men's sprint ===
Position	Skater	Total points Samalog	500m	1000m	500m	1000m
1st place, gold medalist(s)	Tijmen Snel	139.015	35.21 (3)	1:08.51 (1)	34.88 (1)	1:09.34 (3)
2nd place, silver medalist(s)	Janno Botman	139.905	35.29 (4)	1:09.51 (4)	35.03 (2)	1:09.66 (5)
3rd place, bronze medalist(s)	Serge Yoro	140.010	35.38 (6)	1:09.73 (5)	35.22 (4)	1:09.09 (1)
4	Lennart Velema	140.075	35.30 (5)	1:09.43 (3)	35.30 (5)	1:09.52 (4)
5	Wesly Dijs	141.090	35.85 (14)	1:09.25 (2)	35.97 (12)	1:09.29 (2)
6	Mats Siemons	142.395	35.95 (16)	1:10.54 (6)	35.78 (9)	1:10.79 (6)
7	Aron Romeijn	142.720	36.00 (17)	1:11.23 (8)	35.69 (8)	1:10.83 (7)
8	Elwin Jongman	142.895	35.77 (12)	1:11.29 (9)	35.97 (12)	1:11.02 (8)
9	Sebas Diniz	143.000	35.70 (9)	1:11.87 (13)	35.48 (6)	1:11.77 (14)
10	Rem de Hair	143.380	35.86 (15)	1:12.14 (15)	35.80 (10)	1:11.30 (12)
11	Armand Broos	143.495	35.78 (13)	1:12.01 (14)	35.85 (11)	1:11.72 (13)
12	Joost van Dobbenburgh	143.605	35.73 (10)	1:12.60 (16)	36.00 (14)	1:11.15 (9)
13	Jenning de Boo	143.970	36.46 (19)	1:11.72 (10)	36.03 (16)	1:11.24 (11)
14	Thijs Govers	144.895	36.27 (18)	1:11.84 (12)	36.35 (17)	1:12.71 (15)
15	Gijs Esders	202.550	35.50 (7)	1:11.86 (17)	35.53 (7)	1:11.18 (10)
	Ronald Mulder	105.735	35.18 (2)	3:10.87 (7)	35.12 (3)	
	Thomas Geerdinck	107.655	35.73 (10)	1:11.81 (11)	36.02 (15)	
	Dai Dai N'tab	34.900	34.90 (1)	DQ		
	Stefan Westenbroek	35.570	35.57 (8)			
	Kjeld Nuis	DNF	DNF			

=== Women's sprint ===
Position	Skater	Total points Samalog	500m	1000m	500m	1000m
1st place, gold medalist(s)	Michelle de Jong	152.090	38.15 (1)	1:16.17 (2)	37.85 (1)	1:16.01 (2)
2nd place, silver medalist(s)	Marrit Fledderus	153.120	38.32 (3)	1:16.33 (3)	38.24 (3)	1:16.79 (5)
3rd place, bronze medalist(s)	Helga Drost	153.495	38.39 (4)	1:16.61 (4)	38.57 (6)	1:16.46 (4)
4	Jorien ter Mors	153.605	38.85 (10)	1:16.85 (6)	38.41 (4)	1:15.84 (1)
5	Dione Voskamp	153.700	38.15 (1)	1:17.20 (9)	38.10 (2)	1:17.70 (10)
6	Naomi Verkerk	154.080	38.60 (6)	1:17.04 (8)	38.76 (9)	1:16.40 (3)
7	Esmé Stollenga	154.400	38.44 (5)	1:17.53 (10)	38.43 (5)	1:17.53 (9)
8	Isabelle van Elst	154.800	38.78 (9)	1:16.76 (5)	38.99 (12)	1:17.30 (7)
9	Letitia de Jong	154.855	39.01 (12)	1:16.98 (7)	38.90 (10)	1:16.91 (6)
10	Isabel Grevelt	155.450	38.99 (11)	1:17.55 (11)	38.95 (11)	1:17.47 (8)
11	Femke Beuling	155.525	38.70 (8)	1:18.48 (14)	38.65 (7)	1:17.87 (11)
12	Lotte van Beek	157.755	39.57 (16)	1:18.34 (13)	39.83 (16)	1:18.37 (12)
13	Pien Hersman	160.405	39.44 (15)	1:20.65 (16)	39.81 (15)	1:21.66 (15)
14	Ramona Westerhuis	160.680	39.95 (17)	1:21.22 (17)	39.67 (14)	1:20.90 (14)
15	Marit van Beijnum	200.530	39.10 (13)	1:18.30 (12)	1:22.94 (17)	1:18.68 (13)
	Ireen Wüst	114.815	38.61 (7)	1:15.07 (1)	38.67 (8)	DQ
	Maud Lugters	118.325	39.19 (14)	1:19.49 (15)	39.39 (13)	
