= 2019 KNSB Dutch Single Distance Championships – Men's 500 m =

Dutch speed skating competition

- Venue: Thialf, Heerenveen
- Dates: 28 December 2018

Medalist men
1st place, gold medalist(s)		Ronald Mulder	NED
2nd place, silver medalist(s)		Dai Dai N'tab	NED
3rd place, bronze medalist(s)		Jan Smeekens	NED

The men's 500 meter at the 2019 KNSB Dutch Single Distance Championships took place in Heerenveen at the Thialf ice skating rink on Friday 28 December 2018. There were 22 participants.

== Statistics ==
=== Result ===
Position	Skater	Heat	Lane	Time
1st place, gold medalist(s)	Ronald Mulder	10	O	34.60
2nd place, silver medalist(s)	Dai Dai N'tab	9	O	34.72
3rd place, bronze medalist(s)	Jan Smeekens	9	I	34.88
4	Kjeld Nuis	7	I	34.91
5	Kai Verbij	11	O	34.97
6	Michel Mulder	10	I	35.04
7	Hein Otterspeer	8	O	35.11
8	Thomas Krol	1	I	35.14 PR
9	Jesper Hospes	11	I	35.22
10	Lennart Velema	6	I	35.26 PR
11	Martijn van Oosten	4	I	35.50
12	Gerben Jorritsma	7	O	35.55
13	Gijs Esders	8	I	35.59
14	Pim Schipper	3	I	35.62
15	Niek Deelstra	4	O	35.67
16	Joost Born	5	I	35.70
17	Tom Kant	5	O	35.85 PR
18	Tijmen Snel	3	O	35.91
19	Janno Botman	2	I	36.24
20	Thomas Geerdinck	1	O	36.29
NC	Stef Brandsen	2	O	DQ
NC	Aron Romeijn	6	O	DQ

Scheidsrechter: D. Melis. Assistant: F. Zwitser
Starter: J. Smegen
Start: 18:20 hr. Finish: 18:44 hr

=== Draw ===
Heat	Inside lane	Outside lane
1	Thomas Krol	Thomas Geerdinck
2	Janno Botman	Stef Brandsen
3	Pim Schipper	Tijmen Snel
4	Martijn van Oosten	Niek Deelstra
5	Joost Born	Tom Kant
6	Lennart Velema	Aron Romeijn
7	Kjeld Nuis	Gerben Jorritsma
8	Gijs Esders	Hein Otterspeer
9	Jan Smeekens	Dai Dai N'tab
10	Michel Mulder	Ronald Mulder
11	Jesper Hospes	Kai Verbij
