= 2020 World Single Distances Speed Skating Championships – Men's team sprint =

Men's team sprint at the 2020 World Single Distances Speed Skating Championships
- Venue: Utah Olympic Oval
- Location: Salt Lake City, United States
- Dates: February 13
- Competitors: 24 from 8 nations
- Teams: 8
- Winning time: 1:18.18

Medalists
| gold medal | Dai Dai N'tab; Kai Verbij; Thomas Krol | Netherlands |
| silver medal | Gao Tingyu; Wang Shiwei; Ning Zhongyan | China |
| bronze medal | Bjørn Magnussen; Håvard Holmefjord Lorentzen; Odin By Farstad | Norway |

The Men's team sprint competition at the 2020 World Single Distances Speed Skating Championships was held on February 13, 2020.

== Results ==
The race was started at 15:40.

| Rank | Pair | Lane | Country | Time | Diff |
|---|---|---|---|---|---|
| 1st place, gold medalist(s) | 4 | c | Netherlands; Dai Dai N'tab; Kai Verbij; Thomas Krol | 1:18.18 | |
| 2nd place, silver medalist(s) | 1 | c | China; Gao Tingyu; Wang Shiwei; Ning Zhongyan | 1:18.53 | +0.35 |
| 3rd place, bronze medalist(s) | 2 | c | Norway; Bjørn Magnussen; Håvard Holmefjord Lorentzen; Odin By Farstad | 1:19.54 | +1.36 |
| 4 | 1 | s | Japan; Yuma Murakami; Yamato Matsui; Masaya Yamada | 1:19.59 | +1.41 |
| 5 | 4 | s | Switzerland; Oliver Grob; Christian Oberbichler; Livio Wenger | 1:20.03 | +1.85 |
| 6 | 3 | s | Kazakhstan; Artur Galiyev; Stanislav Palkin; Alexander Klenko | 1:20.39 | +2.21 |
| | 2 | s | Russia; Ruslan Murashov; Viktor Mushtakov; Pavel Kulizhnikov | Did not finish | |
| | 3 | c | Canada; Gilmore Junio; Laurent Dubreuil; Antoine Gélinas-Beaulieu | Disqualified | |
