= Merijn Scheperkamp =

Dutch speed skater (born 2000)

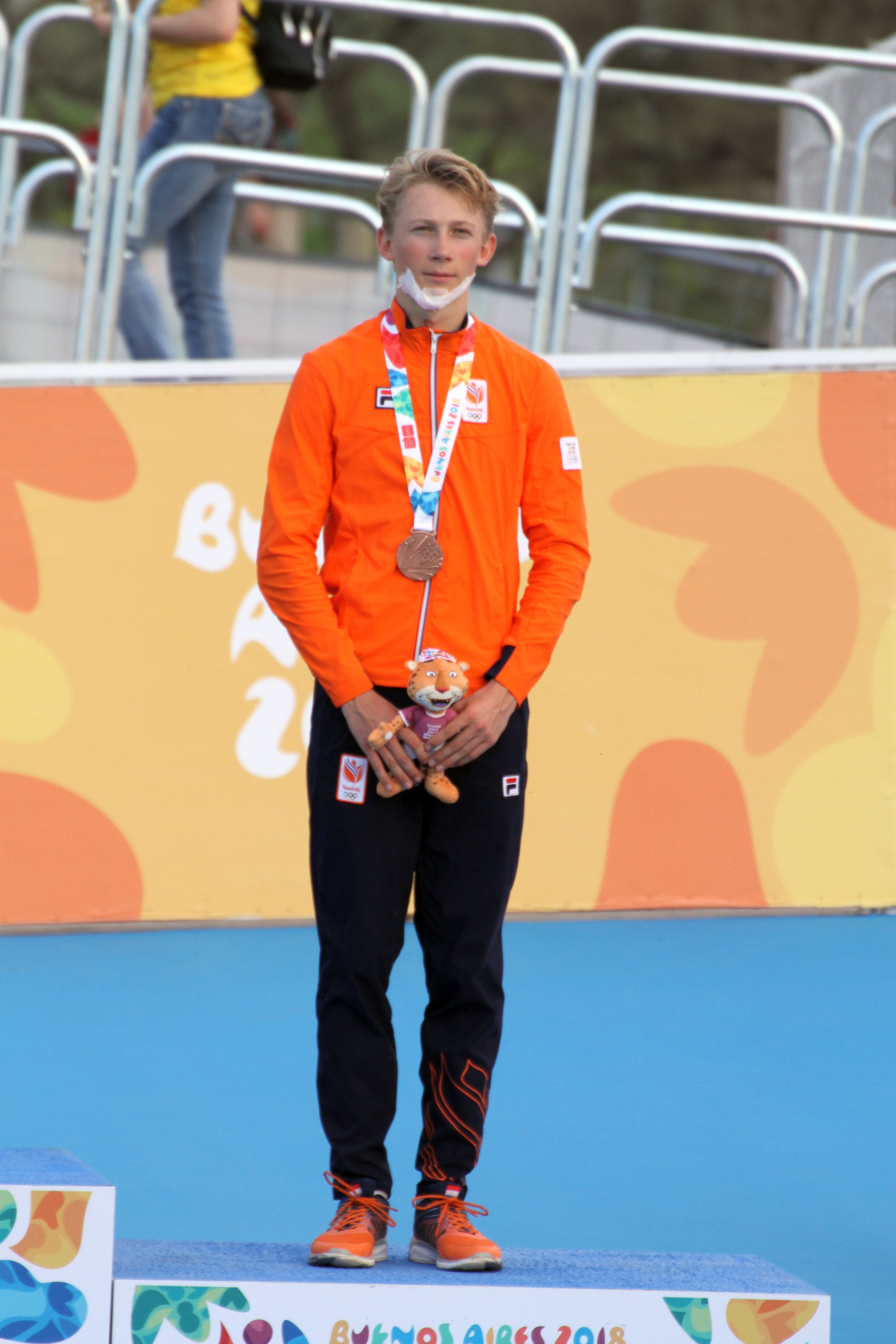
- Scheperkamp at the 2018 Summer Youth Olympics

Personal information
- Born: 6 March 2000 (age 26) Hilversum, Netherlands

Sport
- Country: Netherlands
- Sport: Speed skating
- Event(s): 500m, 1000m, 1500m
- Club: Team Reggeborgh
- Turned pro: 2019
Medal record
Representing the Netherlands
Men's speed skating
World Single Distances Championships
Silver medal – second place	2023 Heerenveen	Team sprint
World Sprint Championships
Bronze medal – third place	2022 Hamar	Team sprint
European Championships
Gold medal – first place	2022 Heerenveen	Team sprint
Gold medal – first place	2023 Hamar	Sprint
Silver medal – second place	2022 Heerenveen	500 m
Silver medal – second place	2025 Heerenveen	Sprint
Silver medal – second place	2026 Tomaszów Mazowiecki	Team sprint
Men's inline speed skating
Youth Olympic Games
Bronze medal – third place	2018 Buenos Aires	Combined

Merijn Scheperkamp (born 6 March 2000) is a Dutch speed skater who specializes in the sprint distances.

== Career ==
Scheperkamp won the bronze medal at inline skating at the 2018 Youth Olympic Games in Buenos Aires. He made his ISU Speed Skating World Cup debut in October 2021 at the Ice Arena Tomaszów Mazowiecki in Poland where he finished ninth in the first heat.

Scheperkamp qualified for the 2022 Winter Olympics by winning the 500m at the 2021 Dutch Olympic Trials. At the Olympic 500m event in Beijing, he finished in twelfth place.

After spending seven seasons with Team Essent (previously known as Team Jumbo-Visma), Scheperkamp moved to Team Reggeborgh in April 2026, signing a contract until the 2027–28 season.

== Personal records ==
Personal records
Speed skating
Event	Result	Date	Location	Notes
500 m	34.41	2 February 2025	Pettit National Ice Center, Milwaukee	
1000 m	1:07.46	5 December 2021	Utah Olympic Oval, Salt Lake City	
1500 m	1:46.18	30 December 2021	Thialf, Heerenveen	
3000 m	3:49.38	20 February 2021	Thialf, Heerenveen	
5000 m	7:03.84	3 February 2019	Kardinge, Groningen	

== Tournament overview ==
Season	Dutch Championships Single Distances	Dutch Championships Sprint	European Championships Single Distances	Olympic Games	World Cup GWC	European Championships Sprint	World Championships Single Distances	World Championships Junior
2018–19								BASELGA di PINÈ 7th 500m 15th 1500m 11th 1000m DNQ 5000m 21st overall
2019–20	HEERENVEEN 15th 500m 11th 1000m 9th 1500m	HEERENVEEN 9th 500m 6th 1000m 10th 500m 7th 1000m 5th overall						
2020–21	HEERENVEEN 7th 500m 11th 1000m 11th 1500m	HEERENVEEN 8th 500m 7th 1000m 7th 500m 11th 1000m 5th overall			34th 500m			
2021–22	HEERENVEEN DQ 500m–1 2nd 500m–2 5th 1000m		HEERENVEEN (silver) 500m (gold) team sprint	BEIJING 12th 500m				
2022–23	HEERENVEEN (gold) 500m–1 (gold) 500m–2 5th 1000m	HEERENVEEN (bronze) 500m 6th 1000m (gold) 500m 5th 1000m (silver) overall			7th 500m 46th 1000m	HAMAR (silver) 500m (silver) 1000m (gold) 500m (silver) 1000m (gold) overall	HEERENVEEN 5th 500m (silver) team sprint	

== Medals won ==
Championship	Gold (gold)	Silver (silver)	Bronze (bronze)
European Single Distances	1	1	0
