= 2018 KNSB Dutch Single Distance Championships – Men's 1500 m =

- Venue: Thialf, Heerenveen
- Dates: 27 October 2017
- Competitors: 23 skaters

Medalist men
1st place, gold medalist(s)		Koen Verweij	NED
2nd place, silver medalist(s)		Thomas Krol	NED
3rd place, bronze medalist(s)		Sven Kramer	NED

The men's 1500 meter at the 2018 KNSB Dutch Single Distance Championships took place in Heerenveen at the Thialf ice skating rink on Friday 27 October 2017. There were 23 participants.

== Statistics ==
=== Result ===
Position	Skater	Heat	Lane	Time
1st place, gold medalist(s)	Koen Verweij	10	I	1:45.07
2nd place, silver medalist(s)	Thomas Krol	10	O	1:45.35
3rd place, bronze medalist(s)	Sven Kramer	11	O	1:46.50
4	Lucas van Alphen	7	O	1:46.70 PR
5	Marcel Bosker	7	I	1:46.83
6	Kjeld Nuis	12	I	1:47.20
7	Jan Blokhuijsen	12	O	1:47.46
8	Patrick Roest	11	I	1:47.80
9	Chris Huizinga	6	O	1:48.69 PR
10	Jos de Vos	4	O	1:48.79
11	Pim Schipper	5	I	1:48.91
12	Lennart Velema	9	O	1:48.99
13	Thomas Geerdinck	4	I	1:49.45
14	Thijs Roozen	8	I	1:49.70
15	Wesly Dijs	8	O	1:50.43
16	Gijs Esders	2	O	1:50.70
17	Tijmen Snel	6	I	1:51.00
18	Gerben Jorritsma	3	I	1:51.02
19	Daan Baks	5	O	1:51.03
20	Jeroen Janissen	2	I	1:52.05
21	Joep Kalverdijk	9	I	1:52.47
22	Lex Dijkstra	1	I	1:52.61
23	Kees Heemskerk	3	O	1:52.86

Referee: Berri de Jonge. Assistant: Ingrid Heijnsbroek
Starter: André de Vries
Start: 20:56 hr. Finish: 21:32 hr.

=== Draw ===
Heat	Inside lane	Outside lane
1	Lex Dijkstra	
2	Jeroen Janissen	Gijs Esders
3	Gerben Jorritsma	Kees Heemskerk
4	Thomas Geerdinck	Jos de Vos
5	Pim Schipper	Daan Baks
6	Tijmen Snel	Chris Huizinga
7	Marcel Bosker	Lucas van Alphen
8	Thijs Roozen	Wesly Dijs
9	Joep Kalverdijk	Lennart Velema
10	Koen Verweij	Thomas Krol
11	Patrick Roest	Sven Kramer
12	Kjeld Nuis	Jan Blokhuijsen
