= 2011 KNSB Dutch Super Sprint Championships =

Speed skating competition in the Netherlands

KNSB Dutch Super Sprint Championships
- Venue: IJsbaan Twente, Enschede
- Dates: 19 February 2011

Medalist men
1st place, gold medalist(s)		Jacques de Koning	NED
2nd place, silver medalist(s)		Ronald Mulder	NED
3rd place, bronze medalist(s)		Michel Mulder	NED

Medalist women
1st place, gold medalist(s)		Thijsje Oenema	NED
2nd place, silver medalist(s)		Mayon Kuipers	NED
3rd place, bronze medalist(s)		Jorien Kranenborg	NED

The 2011 KNSB Dutch Super Sprint Championships in speed skating were held at the IJsbaan Twente ice stadium in Enschede, Netherlands at 19 February 2011.

== Schedule ==
Schedule
Date	Event
19 February 2011	Girls juniors C Boys juniors C Girls juniors B Boys juniors B Women's juniors A Men's juniors A Women's seniors Men's seniors

== Medalist ==
Event	Gold		Silver		Bronze	
Women's seniors	Thijsje Oenema	70.770	Mayon Kuipers	72.550	Jorien Kranenborg	73.990
Men's seniors	Jacques de Koning	65.390	Ronald Mulder	65.500	Michel Mulder	65.750
Women's juniors A	Leonie Smit	73.760	Sanne van der Wal	74.600	Myrthe Brommer	75.580
Men's juniors A	Bauke Wiersma	67.970	Jan Wiebe Riemersma	69.030	Martijn van Oosten	69.100
Girls juniors B	Eveline Kiela	74.490	Bente van de Berge	74.990	Steffi Wubben	75.290
Boys juniors B	Gerben Jorritsma	68.550	Kai Verbij	68.620	Paul-Yme Brunsmann	70.030
Girls juniors C	Sanneke de Neeling	75.970	Tessa Boogaard	76.750	Iza Stekelenburg	77.820
Boys juniors C	Wesly Dijs	71.900	Jelle van Klink	72.480	Kevin Schelling	73.250

== Results ==
=== Senior Results ===
==== Women's seniors ====
Place	Athlete	100m	100m	300m	300m	Points

Source: speedskatingnews.info

==== Men's seniors ====
Place	Athlete	100m	100m	300m	300m	Points

Source: speedskatingnews.info
