= 2019 KNSB Dutch Single Distance Championships – Men's 1000 m =

Dutch speed skater

- Venue: Thialf, Heerenveen
- Dates: 30 December 2018
- Competitors: 24 skaters

Medalist men
1st place, gold medalist(s)		Kjeld Nuis	NED
2nd place, silver medalist(s)		Thomas Krol	NED
3rd place, bronze medalist(s)		Kai Verbij	NED

The men's 1000 meter at the 2019 KNSB Dutch Single Distance Championships took place in Heerenveen at the Thialf ice skating rink on Sunday 30 December 2018. There were 24 participants.

== Statistics ==
=== Result ===
Position	Skater	Heat	Lane	Time
1st place, gold medalist(s)	Kjeld Nuis	12	O	1:08.16
2nd place, silver medalist(s)	Thomas Krol	11	O	1:08.26
3rd place, bronze medalist(s)	Kai Verbij	11	I	1:08.54
4	Hein Otterspeer	10	O	1:09.16
5	Pim Schipper	7	I	1:09.43
6	Dai Dai Ntab	9	I	1:09.80
7	Lennart Velema	12	I	1:09.81
8	Ronald Mulder	1	O	1:09.83
9	Gijs Esders	10	I	1:10.11
10	Wesly Dijs	4	I	1:10.25
11	Martijn van Oosten	8	I	1:10.41
12	Louis Hollaar	4	O	1:10.47
13	Aron Romeijn	8	O	1:10.59
14	Mika van Essen	6	O	1:10.76
15	Tijmen Snel	9	O	1:10.92
16	Michel Mulder	7	O	1:11.01
17	Joost van Dobbenburgh	3	O	1:11.08 PR
18	Joost Born	6	I	1:11.10
19	Jan Smeekens	2	I	1:11.20
20	Tom Kant	1	I	1:11.35
21	Janno Botman	5	O	1:12.00
22	Joep Kalverdijk	2	O	1:12.86
23	Stef Brandsen	3	I	1:12.92
24	Thijs Govers	5	I	1:13.05

Source: Referee: D. Melis. Assistant: F. Zwitser
Starter: J. Rosing

=== Draw ===
Heat	Inside lane	Outside lane
1	Tom Kant	Ronald Mulder
2	Jan Smeekens	Joep Kalverdijk
3	Stef Brandsen	Joost van Dobbenburgh
4	Wesly Dijs	Louis Hollaar
5	Thijs Govers	Janno Botman
6	Joost Born	Mika van Essen
7	Pim Schipper	Michel Mulder
8	Martijn van Oosten	Aron Romeijn
9	Dai Dai Ntab	Tijmen Snel
10	Gijs Esders	Hein Otterspeer
11	Kai Verbij	Thomas Krol
12	Lennart Velema	Kjeld Nuis
