= 2020 European Speed Skating Championships – Men's 500 metres =

Men's 500 metres at the 2020 European Speed Skating Championships
- Venue: Thialf
- Location: Heerenveen, Netherlands
- Dates: 11 January
- Competitors: 20 from 8 nations
- Winning time: 34.38

Medalists
gold medal	Pavel Kulizhnikov	Russia
silver medal	Dai Dai N'tab	Netherlands
bronze medal	Ruslan Murashov	Russia

The men's 500 metres competition at the 2020 European Speed Skating Championships was held on 11 January 2020.

== Results ==
The race was started at 14:08.

Rank	Pair	Lane	Name	Country	Time	Diff
1st place, gold medalist(s)	10	i	Pavel Kulizhnikov	Russia	34.38	
2nd place, silver medalist(s)	8	o	Dai Dai N'tab	Netherlands	34.47	+0.09
3rd place, bronze medalist(s)	8	i	Ruslan Murashov	Russia	34.59	+0.21
4	7	o	Artur Nogal	Poland	34.68	+0.30
5	4	i	Jan Smeekens	Netherlands	34.78	+0.40
6	9	i	Kai Verbij	Netherlands	34.91	+0.53
7	9	o	Håvard Holmefjord Lorentzen	Norway	35.00	+0.62
8	6	i	Bjørn Magnussen	Norway	35.150	+0.77
9	5	o	Artiom Chaban	Belarus	35.159	+0.77
10	4	o	Mathias Vosté	Belgium	35.18	+0.80
11	7	i	Mirko Giacomo Nenzi	Italy	35.19	+0.81
12	6	o	Ignat Golovatsiuk	Belarus	35.20	+0.82
13	5	i	Piotr Michalski	Poland	35.35	+0.97
14	2	i	Damian Żurek	Poland	35.58	+1.20
15	3	o	Jeremias Marx	Germany	35.67	+1.29
16	3	i	Odin By Farstad	Norway	35.68	+1.30
17	1	o	Stefan Emele	Germany	35.89	+1.51
18	1	i	Jeffrey Rosanelli	Italy	35.92	+1.54
19	2	o	Ole Jeske	Germany	36.28	+1.90
20	10	o	Viktor Mushtakov	Russia	38.13	+3.75
