= 2012 KNSB Dutch Super Sprint Championships =

Speed skating competition in the Netherlands

KNSB Dutch Super Sprint Championships
- Venue: Ireen Wüst baan, Tilburg
- Dates: 18 February 2012
- Competitors: 140

Medalist men
1st place, gold medalist(s)		Bas Bervoets	NED
2nd place, silver medalist(s)		Freddy Wennemars	NED
3rd place, bronze medalist(s)		Bauke Wiersma	NED

Medalist women
1st place, gold medalist(s)		Floor van den Brandt	NED
2nd place, silver medalist(s)		Leslie Koen	NED
3rd place, bronze medalist(s)		Esmeralda Nieuwendorp	NED

The 2012 KNSB Dutch Super Sprint Championships in speed skating were held at the Ireen Wüst baan ice stadium in Tilburg, Netherlands at 18 February 2012.

== Schedule ==
Schedule
Date	Time	Event
18 February 2012	13:30	Girls juniors C Boys juniors C Girls juniors B Boys juniors B Women's juniors A Men's juniors A Women's seniors Men's seniors

== Medalist ==
Event	Gold		Silver		Bronze	
Women's seniors	Floor van den Brandt	72.570	Leslie Koen	73.200	Esmeralda Nieuwendorp	74.480
Men's seniors	Bas Bervoets	68.300	Freddy Wennemars	68.400	Bauke Wiersma	68.600
Women's juniors A	Moniek Klijnstra	74.870	Eveline Kiela	75.320	Anna Julia Janssen	76.530
Men's juniors A	Niels Olivier	68.460	Oscar van Leen	68.890	Gerben Jorritsma	69.380
Girls juniors B	Bente van den Berge	74.650	Steffi Wubben	76.670	Janetta Tolsma	77.100
Boys juniors B	Barry Spaan	71.370	Kay Schipper	71.460	Sam van Damme	71.980
Girls juniors C	Dione Voskamp	78.320	Anouk Karel	78.480	Demi van Benthem	78.480
Boys juniors C	Jelte Boersma	71.070	Jesse Visser	73.310	Tim van Benthem	73.410

== Results ==
=== Senior Results ===
==== Women's seniors ====
Place	Athlete	Points	100m	100m	300m	300m
1st place, gold medalist(s)	Floor van den Brandt	72.570	10.74	10.75	25.55	25.53
2nd place, silver medalist(s)	Leslie Koen	73.200	10.79	10.82	25.70	25.89
3rd place, bronze medalist(s)	Esmeralda Nieuwendorp	74.480	10.98	10.94	26.33	26.23
4	Myrthe Brommer	75.150	11.16 pr	11.32	26.42	26.25 pr
5	Britt van der Star	76.220	11.16	11.37	26.78	26.91
6	Chris Geraets	76.660	11.34	11.42	27.08	26.82
7	Kirsten Velzeboer	77.270	11.33	11.48	27.17	27.29
8	Rianne de Vries	77.860	11.62	11.47	27.40	27.37
9	Jorien Kranenborg	78.250	11.51	11.52	27.62	27.60
10	Paulien Westerhof	78.890	11.64	11.74	27.85	27.66
11	Nynke de Jong	78.930	11.56	11.57	28.09	27.71
12	Carolien Hunneman	79.110	11.66	11.67	27.85	27.93
13	Carola Kiers	79.280	11.61	11.55	28.01	28.11
14	Marieke Mast	79.490	11.77	11.66 pr	27.89	28.17
15	Kristel van de Westelaken	79.810	11.88	11.87	28.08	27.98
16	Annabel Regtvoort	80.100	11.90	11.82	28.17	28.21
17	Charlotte Pennings	80.250	11.61 pr	11.62	28.50	28.52
18	Marloes Westerhof	80.650	11.83	11.85	28.46	28.51

Source: Schaatsen.nl

==== Men's seniors ====
Place	Athlete	Points	100m	100m	300m	300m
1st place, gold medalist(s)	Bas Bervoets	68.300	10.25	10.11 pr	24.02	23.92
2nd place, silver medalist(s)	Freddy Wennemars	68.400	10.26	10.03	24.14	23.97
3rd place, bronze medalist(s)	Bauke Wiersma	68.600	10.33	10.17	24.05	24.05
4	Rob van Grinsven	68.790	10.16	10.14	24.20	24.29
5	Piter Sybesma	69.280	10.28	10.51	24.25	24.24
6	Rudy Meereboer	69.300	10.30	10.24	24.45	24.31
7	Jeljer Haarsma	69.330	10.36 pr	10.38	24.25 pr	24.34
8	Jan Wiebe Riemersma	69.920	10.40	10.35	24.66	24.51
9	Pawel Lamme	70.320	10.42	10.43	24.83	24.64 pr
10	Dedjer Wymenga	70.440	10.41	10.49	24.75	24.79
11	Bart Schipper	70.510	10.61	10.58	24.63	24.69
12	Yvo Waalewijn	71.870	10.70	10.72	25.23	25.22
13	Axel Smit	72.000	10.78	10.69	25.35	25.18
14	Bas van Genabeek	72.150	10.80	10.64	25.22	25.49
-	Rienk Nauta	-	10.39	10.47	NS	NS
-	Allard Neijmeijer	-	13.01	NS	NS	NS

Source: Schaatsen.nl

=== Junior A Results ===
==== Women's juniors A ====
Place	Athlete	100m	100m	300m	300m	Points

Source: Schaatsen.nl

==== Men's juniors A ====
Place	Athlete	100m	100m	300m	300m	Points

Source: Schaatsen.nl

=== Junior B Results ===
==== Girls juniors B ====
Place	Athlete	100m	100m	300m	300m	Points

Source: Schaatsen.nl

==== Boys juniors B ====
Place	Athlete	100m	100m	300m	300m	Points

Source: Schaatsen.nl

=== Junior C Results ===
==== Girls juniors C ====
Place	Athlete	100m	100m	300m	300m	Points

Source: Schaatsen.nl

==== Boys juniors C ====
Place	Athlete	100m	100m	300m	300m	Points

Source: Schaatsen.nl
