= 2018 KNSB Dutch Single Distance Championships – Men's 10,000 m =

Dutch speed skating competition

KNSB Dutch Single Distance Championships – Men's 10000 m
- Venue: Thialf, Heerenveen
- Dates: 29 October 2017
- Competitors: 12 skaters

Medalist men
1st place, gold medalist(s)		Jorrit Bergsma	NED
2nd place, silver medalist(s)		Sven Kramer	NED
3rd place, bronze medalist(s)		Erik Jan Kooiman	NED

The men's 10,000 meter at the 2018 KNSB Dutch Single Distance Championships took place in Heerenveen at the Thialf ice skating rink on Sunday 29 October 2017. There were 12 participants.

== Statistics ==
=== Result ===
Position	Skater	Time
1st place, gold medalist(s)	Jorrit Bergsma	12:55.83
2nd place, silver medalist(s)	Sven Kramer	12:58.02
3rd place, bronze medalist(s)	Erik Jan Kooiman	12:59.48
4	Jan Blokhuijsen	13:02.56
5	Jouke Hoogeveen	13:10.08(1) PR
6	Simon Schouten	13:10.08(9)
7	Bob de Vries	13:12.77
8	Douwe de Vries	13:14.46
9	Marcel Bosker	13:17.41 PR
10	Jos de Vos	13:19.45
11	Patrick Roest	13:25.11
12	Mats Stoltenborg	DQ

Referee: Berri de Jonge. Assistant: Ingrid Heijnsbroek
Starter: Alfred van Zwam
Start: 14:31 hr. Finish: 16:14 hr.

=== Draw ===
Heat	Inside lane	Outside lane
1	Marcel Bosker	Jos de Vos
2	Simon Schouten	Patrick Roest
3	Jan Blokhuijsen	Mats Stoltenborg
4	Douwe de Vries	Jouke Hoogeveen
5	Erik Jan Kooiman	Sven Kramer
6	Jorrit Bergsma	Bob de Vries
