= 2010 KNSB Dutch Super Sprint Championships =

Speed skating competition in the Netherlands

KNSB Dutch Super Sprint Championships
- Venue: De Westfries, Hoorn
- Dates: 23 January 2010
- Competitors: 40

Medalist men
1st place, gold medalist(s)		Michael Poot	NED
2nd place, silver medalist(s)		Ronald Mulder	NED
3rd place, bronze medalist(s)		Michel Mulder	NED

Medalist women
1st place, gold medalist(s)		Leslie Koen	NED
2nd place, silver medalist(s)		Jorien Kranenborg	NED
3rd place, bronze medalist(s)		Ellen Hazelaar	NED

The 2010 KNSB Dutch Super Sprint Championships in speed skating were held at the Ice-rink De Westfries ice stadium in Hoorn, Netherlands at 21 January 2010.

== Schedule ==
Schedule
Date	Event
21 January 2010	Women's seniors Men's seniors

== Medalist ==
Event	Gold		Silver		Bronze	
Women's seniors	Leslie Koen	74.020	Jorien Kranenborg	75.030	Ellen Hazelaar; Renske Herder	75.610
Men's seniors	Michael Poot	65.940	Ronald Mulder	66.000	Michel Mulder	66.080
