= Hein Otterspeer =

Dutch speed skater

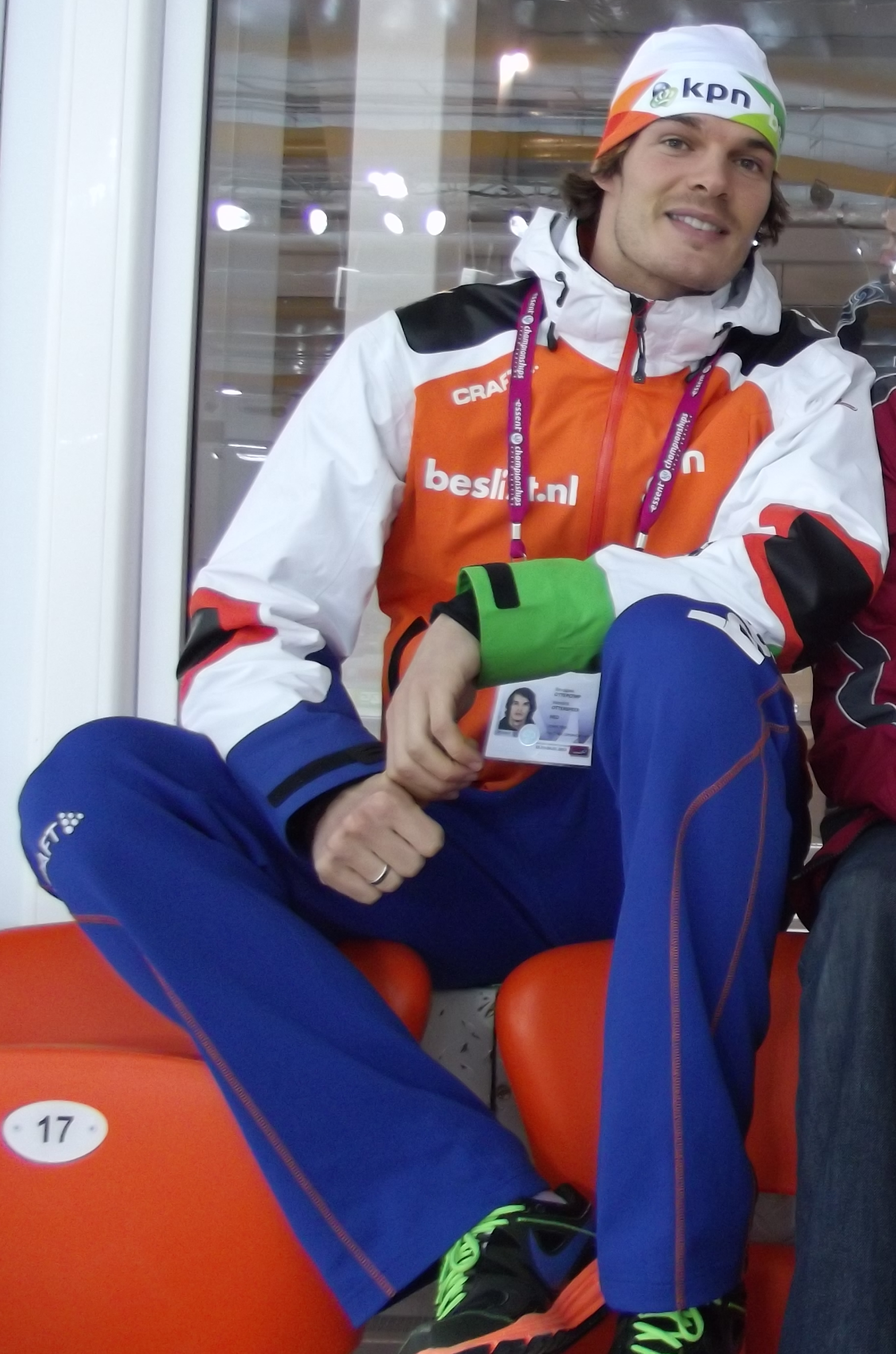
- Otterspeer in 2013

Personal information
- Full name: Hendrik Otterspeer
- Born: 11 November 1988 (age 37) Gouda, Netherlands
- Height: 193 cm (6 ft 4 in)
- Weight: 89 kg (196 lb)

Sport
- Country: Netherlands
- Sport: Speed skating
Medal record
Men's speed skating
Representing the Netherlands
World Single Distances Championships
Silver medal – second place	2023 Heerenveen	Team sprint
World Sprint Championships
Silver medal – second place	2015 Astana	Sprint
Bronze medal – third place	2013 Salt Lake City	Sprint
European Championships
Silver medal – second place	2021 Heerenven	Sprint
Silver medal – second place	2023 Hamar	Sprint

Hendrik "Hein" Otterspeer (born 11 November 1988) is a Dutch speed skater who specialises in the sprint distances.

== Career ==
Otterspeer finished second in the 2014 Dutch sprint championships, held at the Olympisch Stadium in Amsterdam. In January 2015, he became the Dutch sprint champion in Groningen. He finished second at the 2015 World Sprint Speed Skating Championships in Astana, Kazakhstan, behind Pavel Kulizhnikov.

From 2011 through 2014, he was a member of Team Beslist; since 2015, Otterspeer has been a member of Team LottoNL-Jumbo.

== Personal records ==
Personal records
Men's speed skating
Event	Result	Date	Location	Notes
500 m	34.48	29 January 2012	Calgary	
1000 m	1:07.14	2 December 2017	Calgary	
1500 m	1:47.68	9 September 2016	Inzell	
3000 m	4:04.11	20 October 2007	Erfurt	
5000 m	7:14.47	24 November 2007	Eindhoven	

Source: SpeedskatingResults.com

== Tournament overview ==
Season	Dutch Championships Allround	Dutch Championships Single Distances	Dutch Championships Sprint	World Championships Sprint	World Championships Single Distances	World Cup GWC	European Championships Sprint	Olympic Games
2007–08	GRONINGEN 5th 500m 23rd 5000m 20th 1500m DNQ 10000m NC(22) overall							
2008–09		HEERENVEEN 23rd 500m						
2009–10		HEERENVEEN 15th 500m 19th 1000m	GRONINGEN 17th 500m 18th 1000m 16th 500m 20th 1000m 17th overall					
2010–11		HEERENVEEN 6th 500m 4th 1000m 13th 1500m	HEERENVEEN 24th 500m 6th 1000m (bronze) 500m 7th 1000m 20th overall			16th 500m 13th 1000m		
2011–12		HEERENVEEN 5th 500m DQ 1000m	HEERENVEEN (bronze) 500m (gold) 1000m (silver) 500m 9th 1000m (silver) overall	CALGARY 8th 500m 11th 1000m 5th 500m 8th 1000m 7th overall	HEERENVEEN 6th 1000m	20th 500m 23rd 1000m		
2012–13		HEERENVEEN (bronze) 500m (silver) 1000m	GRONINGEN 4th 500m (silver) 1000m 5th 500m 5th 1000m (bronze) overall	SALT LAKE CITY 17th 500m (gold) 1000m 18th 500m (gold) 1000m (bronze) overall		14th 500m (bronze) 1000m		
2013–14		HEERENVEEN 9th 500m 8th 1000m	HEERENVEEN 4th 500m (bronze) 1000m (bronze) 500m (gold) 1000m (silver) overall			34th 500m 36th 1000m		
2014–15		HEERENVEEN 5th 500m 4th 1000m	GRONINGEN (gold) 500m (gold) 1000m (bronze) 500m (gold) 1000m (gold) overall	ASTANA 10th 500m (gold) 1000m (silver) 500m 4th 1000m (silver) overall	HEERENVEEN 4th 500m 5th 1000m	12th 500m 7th 1000m		
2015–16		HEERENVEEN 5th 500m 5th 1000m	HEERENVEEN (silver) 500m 24th 1000m 5th 500m (bronze) 1000m 21st overall			18th 500m		
2016–17		HEERENVEEN 7th 500m 9th 1000m	HEERENVEEN 8th 500m (gold) 1000m 7th 500m DNS 1000m NC overall					
2017–18		HEERENVEEN 4th 500m 6th 1000m	HEERENVEEN (bronze) 500m (silver) 1000m (bronze) 500m (silver) 1000m (silver) overall			(silver) 500m 9th 1000m		
2018–19		HEERENVEEN 7th 500m 4th 1000m	HEERENVEEN 6th 500m (gold) 1000m (bronze) 500m (gold) 1000m (gold) overall	HEERENVEEN 7th 500m 6th 1000m 10th 500m 8th 1000m 8th overall		34th 500m 25th 1000m		
2019–20		HEERENVEEN 4th 500m DQ 1000m	HEERENVEEN 5th 500m DQ 1000m (silver) 500m DNQ 1000m NC overall			23rd 500m 19th 1000m		
2020–21		HEERENVEEN (silver) 500m 4th 1000m	HEERENVEEN (silver) 500m (gold) 1000m (bronze) 500m (bronze) 1000m (gold) overall			6th 500m (bronze) 1000m	HEERENVEEN (bronze) 500m (bronze) 1000m 5th 500m 4th 1000m (silver) overall	
2021–22		HEERENVEEN (bronze) 500m (silver) 1000m				15th 500m (bronze) 1000m		BEIJING 10th 1000m
2022–23		HEERENVEEN (silver) 500m (silver) 1000m	HEERENVEEN 4th 500m (gold) 1000m 4th 500m (bronze) 1000m (silver) overall		HEERENVEEN 6th 500m 6th 1000m (silver) team sprint	19th 500m (gold) 1000m	HAMAR 5th 500m (gold) 1000m 11th 500m (gold) 1000m (silver) overall	

== World Cup overview ==
Season	500 meter											
2010–2011	2nd(b)	2nd(b)	11th	10th	18th	19th	15th	14th	16th	8th	12th	16th
2011–2012	–	–	–	–	–	–	4th(b)	1st(b)	2nd place, silver medalist(s)	9th	7th	15th
2012–2013	7th	13th	9th	15th	9th	13th	11th	16th	9th	13th	16th	7th
2013–2014	–	–	–	–	–	–	4th(b)	4th(b)	DNF	2nd(b)	–	–
2014–2015	4th	17th	6th	11th	13th	10th	8th	10th	7th	–	–	–
2015–2016	DNF	16th	19th	26th	5th	8th	14th	10th	–	–	–	–
2016–2017												
2017–2018	2nd place, silver medalist(s)	5th	2nd place, silver medalist(s)	3rd place, bronze medalist(s)	10th	–	–	8th	13th	1st place, gold medalist(s)	3rd place, bronze medalist(s)	
2018–2019	–	19th	–	4th(b)	–	–	–	–	2nd(b)	–	–	
2019–2020	3rd(b)	14th	–	7th(b)	2nd(b)	19th	–	–				
2020–2021	7th	10th	18th	2nd place, silver medalist(s)								
2021–2022	12th	8th	14th	15th	7th	DQ	–	–	13th	12th		
2022–2023	19th	6th(b)	–	1st(b)	4th	1st(b)						

Season	1000 meter								
2010–2011	13th	8th	11th	9th	9th	10th	–	–	
2011–2012	–	–	–	DNF(b)	7th	7th	–	–	
2012–2013	5th	17th	1st place, gold medalist(s)	2nd place, silver medalist(s)	3rd place, bronze medalist(s)	6th	1st place, gold medalist(s)	11th	10th
2013–2014	–	–	–	13th	–	–			
2014–2015	8th	13th	3rd place, bronze medalist(s)	3rd place, bronze medalist(s)	4th	–			
2015–2016									
2016–2017									
2017–2018	–	–	1st(b)	–	2nd place, silver medalist(s)	6th			
2018–2019	13th	11th	–	DQ	2nd(b)	–			
2019–2020	4th	–	3rd place, bronze medalist(s)	–	–				
2020–2021	5th	4th							
2021–2022	1st place, gold medalist(s)	8th	3rd place, bronze medalist(s)	–	3rd place, bronze medalist(s)				
2022–2023	6th	8th	1st place, gold medalist(s)	4th	1st place, gold medalist(s)	3rd place, bronze medalist(s)			

- GWC = Grand World Cup
- – = Did not participate
- DQ = Disqualified
- (b) = World Cup division B
- DNF = Did not finish
