= Wilhelm Ekensskär =

Swedish speed skater

Personal information
- Born: June 18, 1998 (age 28)

Sport
- Country: Sweden
- Sport: Speed skating

Wilhelm Ekensskär (born 18 June 1998) is a Swedish speed skater.

He took part in the 2022 European Speed Skating Championships - individual distances where he came 16th in the 5000 metres.
