= Janno Botman =

Dutch long track speed skater

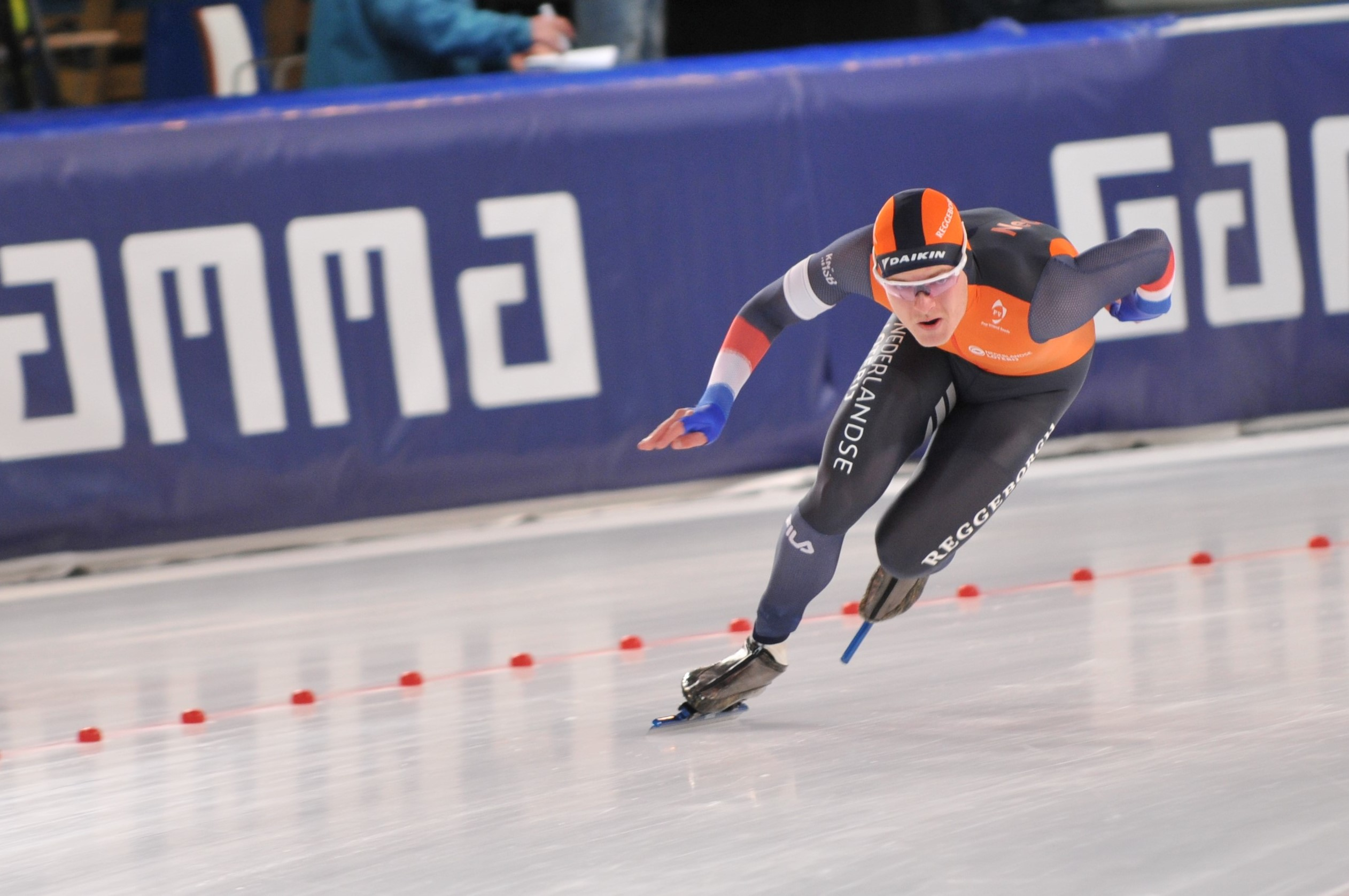
- Janno Botman (2022)

Personal information
- Nationality: Dutch
- Born: 8 March 2000 (age 26) Andijk, Netherlands
- Height: 180 cm (5 ft 11 in)

Sport
- Country: Netherlands
- Sport: Speed skating
- Event: sprint distances
- Club: Team Reggeborgh
- Coached by: Gerard van Velde
Medal record
Men's speed skating
Representing the Netherlands
World Single Distances Championships
| Silver medal – second place | 2024 Calgary | Team sprint |
| Silver medal – second place | 2025 Hamar | Team sprint |

Janno Botman (born 8 March 2000) is a Dutch long track speed skater.

== Personal records ==
Personal records
Speed skating
| Event | Result | Date | Location | Notes |
| 500 meter | 34.35 | 27 January 2024 | Salt Lake City | |
| 1000 meter | 1:08.06 | 28 December 2022 | Heerenveen | |
| 1500 meter | 1:48.68 | 10 October 2021 | Inzell | |
| 3000 meter | 4:01.08 | 12 November 2017 | Inzell | |
| 5000 meter | 7:30.92 | 11 February 2018 | Enschede | |

== Tournament overview ==
| Season | Dutch Championships Single Distances | Dutch Championships Sprint | World Championships Junior |
|---|---|---|---|
| 2017–18 | | | SALT LAKE CITY 11th 500m 19th mass start 4th team sprint 8th team pursuit |
| 2018–19 | HEERENVEEN 20th 500m 21st 1000m | | BASELGA di PINÉ (bronze) 500m (gold) 1000m 22nd 1500m (gold) team sprint (bronze) team pursuit |
| 2019–20 | HEERENVEEN 14th 500m 15th 1000m | HEERENVEEN 7th 500m 10th 1000m 7th 500m 6th 1000m 6th overall | |
| 2020–21 | | HEERENVEEN 11th 500m 13th 1000m 13th 500m DNS 1000m NC overall | |
| 2021–22 | HEERENVEEN 4th 500m 14th 1000m | HEERENVEEN 4th 500m 4th 1000m (silver) 500m 5th 1000m (silver) overall | |
