= Tijmen Snel =

Dutch speed skater (born 1997)

Personal information
- Nationality: Dutch
- Born: 11 December 1997 (age 28) Amsterdam, Netherlands
- Height: 1.81 m (5 ft 11 in)

Sport
- Country: Netherlands
- Sport: Speed skating
- Event(s): 500m, 1000m, 1500m
- Club: Team Essent
- Coached by: Jac Orie

Tijmen Snel (born 11 December 1997) is a Dutch speed skater who specializes in the sprint distances.

== Career ==
In February 2026, Snel represented the Netherlands at the 2026 Winter Olympics in the 1500 metres. He finished in eleventh place.

== Personal records ==
Personal records
Speed skating
Event	Result	Date	Location	Notes
500 meter	34.75	14 February 2025	Heerenveen	
1000 meter	1:08.09	29 October 2023	Heerenveen	
1500 meter	1:43.14	15 November 2025	Salt Lake City	
3000 meter	3:52.97	20 February 2021	Heerenveen	
5000 meter	6:41.34	26 January 2019	Heerenveen	
10000 meter	14:12.71	27 January 2019	Heerenveen	

== Tournament overview ==
Season	Dutch Championships Single Distances	Dutch Championships Allround	Dutch Championships Sprint	World Championships Sprint	European Championships Single Distances	World Championships Junior
2016–17						HELSINKI 16th 500m DNF 1000m 12th 1500m (gold) team sprint (silver) team pursuit
2017–18	HEERENVEEN 18th 500m 20th 1000m 17th 1500m	HEERENVEEN (gold) 500m 10th 5000m (silver) 1500m DNQ 10000m NC overall				
2018–19	HEERENVEEN 19th 500m 15th 1000m 11th 1500m	HEERENVEEN (gold) 500m 13th 5000m 6th 1500m 8th 10000m 7th overall				
2019–20	HEERENVEEN 10th 500m 9th 1000m		HEERENVEEN 10th 500 m 4th 1000m 5th 500m 4th 1000m 5th overall			
2020–21	HEERENVEEN 5th 500m 13th 1000m 4th 1500m		HEERENVEEN 6th 500m 10th 1000m 5th 500 m 4th 1000m 5th overall			
2021–22	HEERENVEEN 5th 500m 6th 1000m 8th 1500m		HEERENVEEN (bronze) 500m (gold) 1000m (gold) 500m (bronze) 1000m (gold) overall	HAMAR 14th 500m 6th 1000m 12th 500m 9th 1000m 10th overall	HEERENVEEN 10th 1500m (gold) team sprint	
