= Dai Dai N'tab =

Dutch speed skater (born 1994)

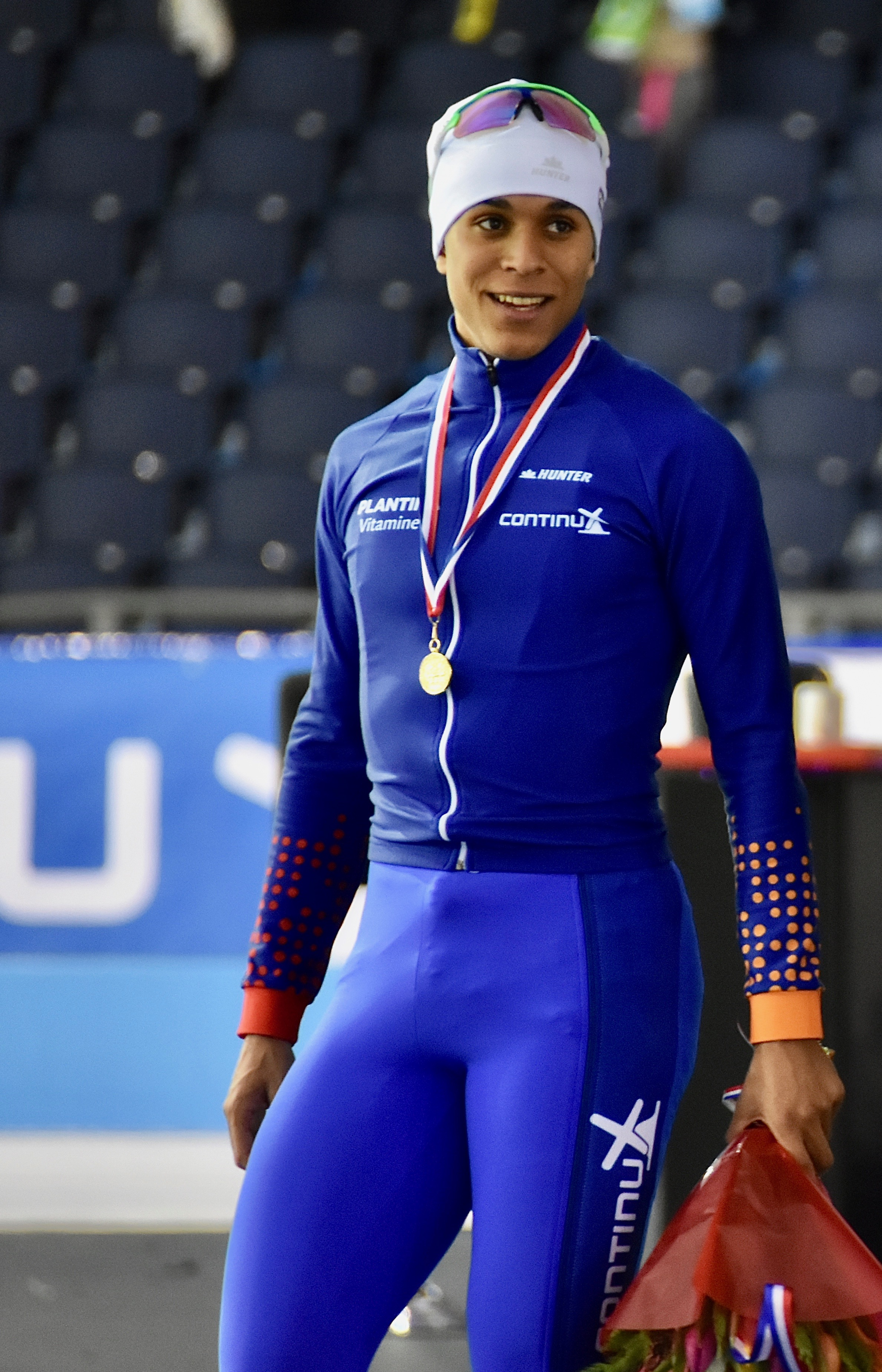

Personal information
- Nationality: Dutch
- Born: 17 August 1994 (age 32) Amsterdam, Netherlands
- Height: 1.85 m (6 ft 1 in)

Sport
- Country: Netherlands
- Sport: Speed skating
- Event: 500 m
- Club: Team jumbo visma
- Coached by: Jac orie
Medal record
World Single Distances Championships
Gold medal – first place	2020 Salt Lake City	Team sprint
Bronze medal – third place	2021 Heerenveen	500 m
European Championships
Silver medal – second place	2020 Heerenveen	500 m
Bronze medal – third place	2022 Heerenveen	500 m

Dai Dai N'tab (born 17 August 1994) is a Dutch professional long track speed skater who specializes in the sprint distances. He is a member of Team Plantina. He has a Senegalese father and a Dutch mother.

== Career ==
At the 2016 Dutch Sprint Championships he finished 12th but won the second 500m.

On 3 December 2016 he won the 500 m at the third World Cup of the 2016/17 season, held in Astana. It was his first World Cup win and in doing so he improved his personal record by 0.44s and set a new track record.

He studied Communication and Marketing at the Johan Cruyff College in Groningen.

== Personal records ==
Personal records
Men's speed skating
Event	Result	Date	Location	Notes
500 meter	34.15	9 December 2017	Salt Lake City	
1000 meter	1:08.39	28 December 2020	Heerenveen	
1500 meter	1:50.56	22 March 2015	Calgary	
3000 meter	4:24.35	8 October 2015	Heerenveen	

== Tournament overview ==
Season	Dutch Championships Junior	Dutch Championships Single Distances	Dutch Championships Sprint	World Championships Sprint	World Championships Single Distances	World Cup Classification GWC	World Championships Junior	European Championships Single Distances
2013–14	TILBURG (silver) 500m[1] (gold) 500m[2] 8th 1000m (silver) 500m samalog	HEERENVEEN 16th 500m[1] 19th 500m[2] 18th 500m samalog					BJUGN (bronze) 500m 14th 1000m	
2014–15		HEERENVEEN 6th 500m 16th 1000m	GRONINGEN 4th 500m 24th 1000m 6th 500m 17th 1000m 18th overall			29th 500m		
2015–16		HEERENVEEN 4th 500m 13th 1000m	HEERENVEEN 10th 500m 20th 1000m (gold) 500m 14th 1000m 12th overall					
2016–17		HEERENVEEN (gold) 500m 10th 1000m	HEERENVEEN (bronze) 500m 11th 1000m (gold) 500m 8th 1000m 4th overall		GANGNEUNG DQ 500m	(gold) 500m		
2017–18		HEERENVEEN (gold) 500m 7th 1000m	HEERENVEEN (gold) 500m 4th 1000m (silver) 500m 4th 1000m (gold) overall			8th 500m 41st 1000m		
2018–19		HEERENVEEN (silver) 500m 6th 1000m	HEERENVEEN (gold) 500m 5th 1000m (silver) 500m 6th 1000m (silver) overall			15th 500m 43rd 1000m		
2019–20		HEERENVEEN (gold) 500m (bronze) 1000m		HAMAR 10th 500m 13th 1000m 6th 500m 11th 1000m 9th overall	SALT LAKE CITY 13th 500m (gold) team sprint	7th 500m 20th 1000m		HEERENVEEN (silver) 500m 6th 1000m
2020–21		HEERENVEEN (gold) 500m 6th 1000m	HEERENVEEN (gold) 500m 6th 1000m (silver) 500m 6th 1000m (bronze) overall		HEERENVEEN (bronze) 500m	(gold) 500m 5th 1000m		
2021–22		HEERENVEEN (silver) 500m 7th 1000m	HEERENVEEN (gold) 500m DQ 1000m DNS 500m DNS 1000m NC overall			12th 500m		
2022–23		HEERENVEEN (silver) 500m[1] 5th 500m[2] 5th 500m samalog 9th 1000m	HEERENVEEN 7th 500m 14th 1000m DQ 500m DNS 1000m NC overall		HEERENVEEN 7th 500m	9th 500m		

== World Cup overview ==
Season	500 meter											
2014–2015	–	–	1st(b)	9th	–	–	–	–	–	–	–	–
2016–2017	4th(b)	9th	11th	1st place, gold medalist(s)	4th	12th	14th	12th	1st place, gold medalist(s)	1st place, gold medalist(s)		
2017–2018	5th	19th	17th	8th	13th	4th	3rd place, bronze medalist(s)	15th	8th	6th	2nd place, silver medalist(s)	
2018–2019	15th	5th	7th	12th	9th	DQ	5th	3rd place, bronze medalist(s)	–	–	–	
2019–2020	3rd place, bronze medalist(s)	9th	15th	11th	5th	14th	7th	6th				
2020–2021	1st place, gold medalist(s)	2nd place, silver medalist(s)	3rd place, bronze medalist(s)	6th								
2021–2022	14th	14th	13th	6th	12th	10th	–	–	14th	10th		
2022–2023	10th	7th	17th	8th	–	3rd place, bronze medalist(s)						

Season	1000 meter					
2014–2015						
2016–2017						
2017–2018						
2018–2019	–	–	16th(b)	5th(b)	–	–
2019–2020	10th	9th	14th	–	–	
2020–2021	7th	5th	–			
2021–2022	–	–	–			
2022–2023						

Season	Team sprint				
2014–2015					
2016–2017					
2017–2018					
2018–2019					
2019–2020	–	–	–	–	5th
2020–2021					
2021–2022					
2022–2023					

- GWC = Grand World Cup
- – = Did not participate
- DQ = Disqualified
- (b) = World Cup division B
