= Sebas Diniz =

Dutch speed skater (born 2002)

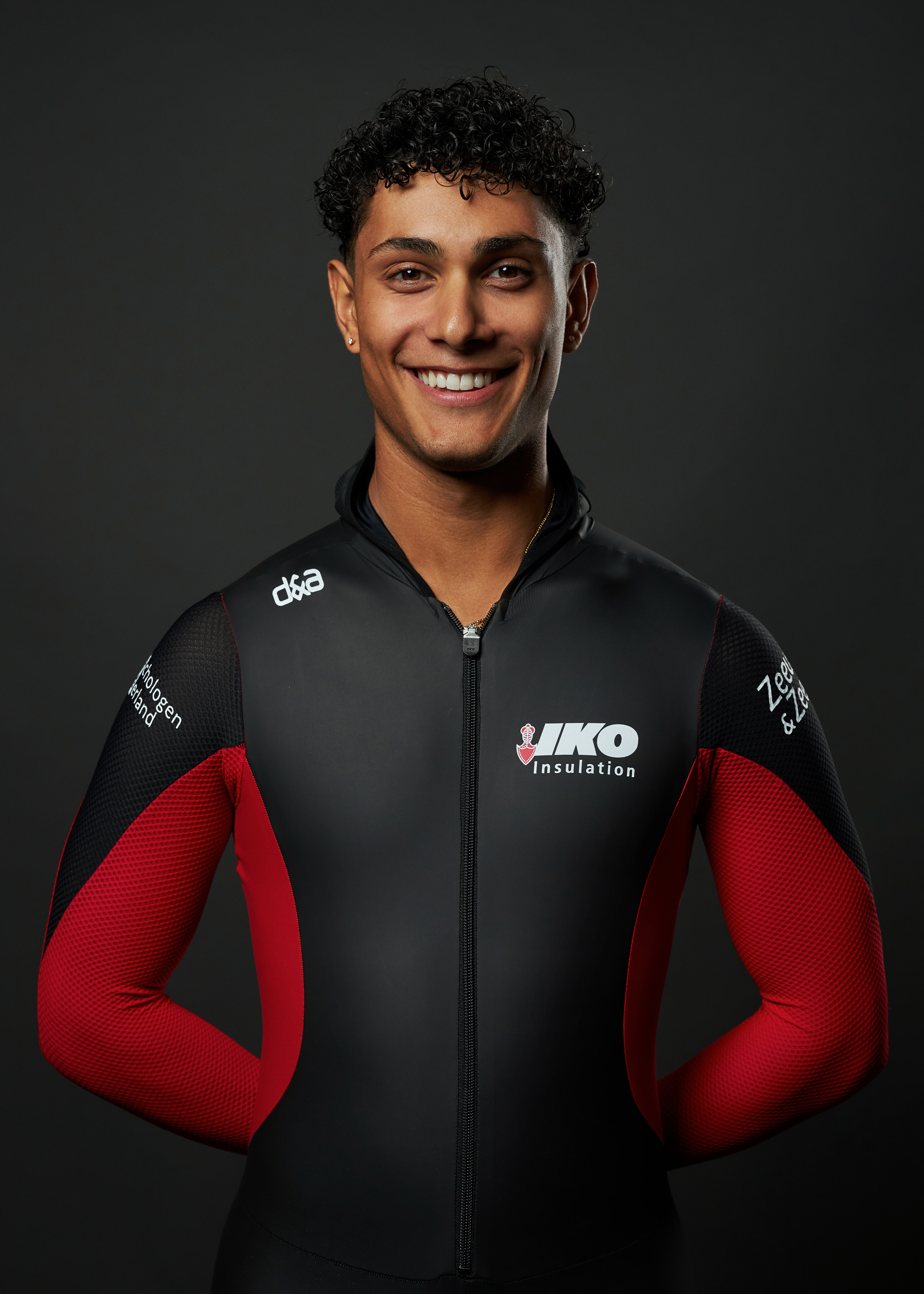
- Diniz in 2022

Personal information
- Full name: Sebastian Diniz
- Born: 16 January 2002 (age 24) Eibergen, Netherlands

Sport
- Country: Netherlands
- Sport: Speed skating
- Events: 500 m, 1000 m
- Club: Team Essent

Sebastian Diniz (born 16 January 2002) is a Dutch speed skater who is specializes in the sprint distances.

== Career ==
Diniz made his breakthrough at the 2025–26 Dutch National Single Distances Championships, when he clocked a personal record of 34.34 en route to a silver medal in the 500 m. Later that season, he represented the Netherlands at the 2026 Winter Olympics in the men's 500 metres, clocking a time of 34.46 to place fifth.

In May 2026, Diniz left Team IKO-X²O to join Team Essent.

== Personal life ==
Diniz's father is of Kenyan descent. Through him, he holds dual British and Dutch citizenship. His younger brother Philip is also a speed skater.

== Personal records ==
Personal records
Speed skating
Event	Result	Date	Location	Notes
500 m	34.11	22 November 2025	Calgary	
1000 m	1:09.37	28 February 2026	Heerenveen	
1500 m	1:53.43	15 November 2025	Inzell	
3000 m	4:11.31	31 July 2021	Heerenveen	
