= Jesper Hospes =

Dutch speed skater (born 1988)

- Jesper Hospes in Thialf

Personal information
- Born: 19 October 1988 (age 38) Heerenveen, Friesland, Netherlands
- Years active: 2008-2022

Sport
- Sport: Short-track speed skating 500-metre
- Coached by: Tuomas Nieminen

Jesper Hospes (born 19 October 1988) is a Dutch former long-track speed skater who competed for the Friesland regional branch of the KNSB (Royal Dutch Skating Federation).

== Biography ==
Like his father, Henk Hospes, Jesper is a specialist in short-track speed skating. Hospes was part of the KNSB Training Team, a squad dedicated to developing emerging long-track speed skaters. There, he trained under the guidance of Peter Kolder and Jeroen van der Lee. Hospes made his senior-level début during the 2008/2009 season at the Dutch Single Distances Championships held at Thialf. He competed in the 500-metre and 1000-metre events, finishing 13th and 18th, respectively. In January 2009, Hospes became the Frisian champion in short-track speed skating, and a year later, he went on to win the Dutch national title. On 6 January 2012, Hospes secured his second national short-track title. Furthermore, in the autumn of 2010, Hospes won the first short-track speed skating competition held on natural ice.. In 2010, he made the move to the short track development team.

In the two years that followed, Hospes competed only in the 500 metres, finishing 19th and 11th, respectively. Until 2016, Hospes trained under the guidance of Gerard van Velde as part of Team Beslist.nl; the partnership ended when the team was disbanded. During the 2015 Dutch Sprint Championships, Hospes placed third, qualifying for the 2015 World Single Distances Championships in Thialf and finishing ahead of Olympic medalists Ronald Mulder and Jan Smeekens. From the 2016–2017 skating season, he trained with Team Victorie under the leadership of Desly Hill. In the 2017–2018 season, he joined the Friesland regional team (Gewest Friesland). In the autumn of 2020, he completed his level 4 (ST4) skating coach certification, and the next season, he joined the Polish national team..

== Personal life ==
Hospes is in a relationship with fellow long-track speed skater Janine Smit, who, like him, hails from Heerenveen.

== Personal bests ==
Distance	Time	Date	Track
500 m	34.50	2 November 2013	(Canada) Calgary
1000 m	1:09.93	2 January 2016	(Netherlands) Heerenveen
1500 m	1:50.38	13 March 2008	(Canada) Calgary
3000 m	4:07.96	18 March 2007	(Netherlands) Heerenveen
5000 m	7:14.95	19 March 2007	(Netherlands) Heerenveen

== Results ==
Year	NK Distance	NK Sprint	NK short-track	WK Distance	World Cup
2008	15th 500 m				
2009	13th 500 m 18th 1000 m	18th			
2010	19th 500 m	16th	1st place, gold medalist(s)		
2011	11th 500 m	9th			
2012	4th 500 m 19th 1000 m	11th	1st place, gold medalist(s)		17th 500 m
2013	6th 500 m 13th 1000 m	11th	1st place, gold medalist(s)		40th 500 m
2014	4th 500 m 16th 1000 m	8th			7th 500 m
2015	8th 500 m	8th		10th 500 m	33rd 500 m
2016	7th 500 m 15th 1000 m	5th			
2017		12th			
2018	8th 500 m 21st 1000 m	10th			
2019	9th 500 m	7th			
2020	5th 500 m 16th 1000 m	4th			
2021	6th 500 m 14th 1000 m	11th			
2022	NS2 500 m				

== External link ==
- "Profiel: Jesper Hospes" Lisette van der Geest, schaatsen.nl, 1 January 2013
