= KNSB Dutch Sprint Championships =

National speed skating championship

The Dutch Sprint Championships of speed skating, organised by the Royal Dutch Speed Skating Association (KNSB), is the official Dutch championship to determine the Dutch Sprint champion. The Sprint distance championships date back to 1969 for men and 1983 for women.

== Men's sprint ==
Men's medalists
Year	Venue	Gold	Silver	Bronze
1969	Heerenveen	Frits Bartling	Jan Bazen	Marten Hoekstra
1970	Deventer	Jan Bazen	Marten Hoekstra	Jos Valentijn
1971	Amsterdam	Jan Bazen	Marten Hoekstra	Eppie Bleeker
1972	Deventer	Jan Bazen	Marten Hoekstra	Anne Brouwer
1973	Heerenveen	Jos Valentijn	Jan Bazen	Eppie Bleeker
1974	Assen	Eppie Bleeker	Jan Bazen	Johnny Olof
1975	Assen	Eppie Bleeker	Jos Valentijn	Jan Bazen
1976	Groningen	Jos Valentijn	Piet de Boer	Jan Bazen
1977	Assen	Jos Valentijn	Sies Uilkema	Eppie Bleeker
1978	Eindhoven	Miel Govaert	Jos Valentijn	Lieuwe de Boer
1979	Heerenveen	Miel Govaert	Lieuwe de Boer	Jan van de Roemer
1980	The Hague	Jan van de Roemer	Lieuwe de Boer	Bert de Jong
1981	Assen	Lieuwe de Boer	Sies Uilkema	Jan van de Roemer
1982	Heerenveen	Jan Ykema	Miel Govaert	Lieuwe de Boer
1983	Utrecht	Sies Uilkema	Hein Vergeer	Hilbert van der Duim
1984	Eindhoven	Hein Vergeer	Geert Kuiper	Ron Ket
1985	Utrecht	Hein Vergeer	Geert Kuiper	Hilbert van der Duim
1986	Utrecht	Geert Kuiper	Hein Vergeer	Jan Ykema
1987	Deventer	Jan Ykema	Geert Kuiper	Menno Boelsma
1988	Alkmaar	Jan Ykema	Arie Loef	Hein Vergeer
1989	Heerenveen	Arie Loef	Jan Ykema	Tjerk Terpstra
1990	Assen	Tjerk Terpstra	Gerjan van de Brink	Menno Boelsma
1991	Assen	Arie Loef	Hans Janssen	Gerjan van de Brink
1992	Heerenveen	Gerard van Velde	Jan Jan Brouwer	Menno Boelsma
1993	Utrecht	Gerard van Velde	Arjan Schreuder	Marco Groeneveld
1994	The Hague	Nico van der Vlies	Arie Loef	Jakko Jan Leeuwangh
1995	Alkmaar	Gerard van Velde	Jakko Jan Leeuwangh	Arnold van der Poel
1996	Assen	Gerard van Velde	Jakko Jan Leeuwangh	Jan Bos
1997	Groningen	Jan Bos	Gerard van Velde	Erben Wennemars
1998	Groningen	Jan Bos	Erben Wennemars	Ids Postma
1999	Groningen	Jan Bos	Jakko Jan Leeuwangh	Erben Wennemars
2000	Utrecht	Jan Bos	Jakko Jan Leeuwangh	Gerard van Velde
2001	Heerenveen	Erben Wennemars	Gerard van Velde	Jeroen Straathof
2002	Groningen	Gerard van Velde	Jan Bos	Erben Wennemars
2003	Groningen	Jan Bos	Jacques de Koning	Beorn Nijenhuis
2004	Utrecht	Erben Wennemars	Gerard van Velde	Beorn Nijenhuis
2005	Groningen	Gerard van Velde	Jan Bos	Jacques de Koning
2006	Assen	Stefan Groothuis	Gerard van Velde	Beorn Nijenhuis
2007	Groningen	Erben Wennemars	Jan Bos	Beorn Nijenhuis
2008	Heerenveen	Jan Bos	Jacques de Koning	Lars Elgersma
2009	Groningen	Stefan Groothuis	Erben Wennemars	Mark Tuitert
2010	Groningen	Stefan Groothuis	Mark Tuitert	Beorn Nijenhuis
2011	Heerenveen	Stefan Groothuis	Jan Smeekens	Jan Bos
2012	Heerenveen	Stefan Groothuis	Hein Otterspeer	Sjoerd de Vries
2013	Groningen	Stefan Groothuis	Michel Mulder	Hein Otterspeer
2014	Amsterdam	Michel Mulder	Hein Otterspeer	Kjeld Nuis
2015	Groningen	Hein Otterspeer	Michel Mulder	Pim Schipper
2016	Heerenveen	Kai Verbij	Ronald Mulder	Gerben Jorritsma
2017	Heerenveen	Ronald Mulder	Jan Smeekens	Pim Schipper
2018	Heerenveen	Dai Dai N'tab	Hein Otterspeer	Thomas Krol
2019	Heerenveen	Hein Otterspeer	Dai Dai N'tab	Lennart Velema
2020	Heerenveen	Kjeld Nuis	Lennart Velema	Gijs Esders
2021	Heerenveen	Hein Otterspeer	Kai Verbij	Dai Dai N'tab
2022	Heerenveen	Tijmen Snel	Janno Botman	Serge Yoro
2023	Heerenveen	Hein Otterspeer	Merijn Scheperkamp	Kai Verbij

Source: www.knsb.nl, schaatsen.nl

== Women's sprint ==
Women's medalists
Year	Venue	Gold	Silver	Bronze
1983	Utrecht	Alie Boorsma	Yvonne van Gennip	Thea Limbach
1984	Eindhoven	Yvonne van Gennip	Els Meijer	Alie Boorsma
1985	Utrecht	Yvonne van Gennip	Alie Boorsma	Els Meijer
1986	Utrecht	Petra Moolhuizen	Yvonne van Gennip	Marieke Stam
1987	Deventer	Christine Aaftink	Els Meijer	Boukje Keulen
1988	Alkmaar	Christine Aaftink	Ingrid Haringa	Mariska Hekkers
1989	Heerenveen	Christine Aaftink	Anita Loorbach	Anja Bollaart
1990	Assen	Christine Aaftink	Marion van Zuilen	Anita Loorbach
1991	Assen	Marieke Stam	Christine Aaftink	Herma Meijer
1992	Heerenveen	Christine Aaftink	Anita Loorbach	Marieke Stam
1993	Utrecht	Christine Aaftink	Herma Meijer	Marieke Stam
1994	The Hague	Christine Aaftink	Sandra Zwolle	Leontine van Meggelen
1995	Alkmaar	Annamarie Thomas	Sandra Zwolle	Christine Aaftink
1996	Assen	Annamarie Thomas	Christine Aaftink	Andrea Nuyt
1997	Groningen	Marianne Timmer	Annamarie Thomas	Sandra Zwolle
1998	Groningen	Marianne Timmer	Annamarie Thomas	Andrea Nuyt
1999	Groningen	Marianne Timmer	Andrea Nuyt	Tonny de Jong
2000	Utrecht	Andrea Nuyt	Marianne Timmer	Marieke Wijsman
2001	Heerenveen	Marianne Timmer	Andrea Nuyt	Frouke Oonk
2002	Groningen	Andrea Nuyt	Annamarie Thomas	Marieke Wijsman
2003	Groningen	Marianne Timmer	Marieke Wijsman	Frouke Oonk
2004	Utrecht	Marianne Timmer	Andrea Nuyt	Annamarie Thomas
2005	Groningen	Marianne Timmer	Frouke Oonk	Annette Gerritsen
2006	Assen	Marianne Timmer	Sanne van der Star	Annette Gerritsen
2007	Groningen	Marianne Timmer	Annette Gerritsen	Margot Boer
2008	Heerenveen	Marianne Timmer	Ireen Wüst	Margot Boer
2009	Groningen	Margot Boer	Natasja Bruintjes	Laurine van Riessen
2010	Groningen	Annette Gerritsen	Margot Boer	Laurine van Riessen
2011	Heerenveen	Margot Boer	Annette Gerritsen	Laurine van Riessen
2012	Heerenveen	Margot Boer	Thijsje Oenema	Marrit Leenstra
2013	Groningen	Marrit Leenstra	Margot Boer	Laurine van Riessen
2014	Amsterdam	Margot Boer	Lotte van Beek	Thijsje Oenema
2015	Groningen	Thijsje Oenema	Laurine van Riessen	Margot Boer
2016	Heerenveen	Sanneke de Neeling	Marrit Leenstra	Margot Boer
2017	Heerenveen	Ireen Wüst	Anice Das	Sanneke de Neeling
2018	Heerenveen	Letitia de Jong	Anice Das	Sanneke de Neeling
2019	Heerenveen	Jutta Leerdam	Letitia de Jong	Sanneke de Neeling
2020	Heerenveen	Letitia de Jong	Jorien ter Mors	Femke Kok
2021	Heerenveen	Jutta Leerdam	Femke Kok	Suzanne Schulting
2022	Heerenveen	Michelle de Jong	Marrit Fledderus	Helga Drost
2023	Heerenveen	Jutta Leerdam	Femke Kok	Marrit Fledderus

Source: www.knsb.nl, schaatsen.nl

== See also ==
- KNSB Dutch Allround Championships
