= 2017 KNSB Dutch Single Distance Championships – Men's mass start =

Dutch speed skating competition

- Venue: Thialf, Heerenveen
- Dates: 30 December 2016
- Competitors: 30 skaters

Medalist men
1st place, gold medalist(s)		Gary Hekman	NED
2nd place, silver medalist(s)		Arjan Stroetinga	NED
3rd place, bronze medalist(s)		Jan Blokhuijsen	NED

The men's mass start at the 2017 KNSB Dutch Single Distance Championships in Heerenveen took place at Thialf ice rink on Friday 30 December 2016. There were 30 participants.

== Result ==
Rank	Skater	Rounds	Points				
Rank	Skater	Rounds	Sprint 1	Sprint 2	Sprint 3	Final sprint	Total
1st place, gold medalist(s)	Gary Hekman	16				60	60
2nd place, silver medalist(s)	Arjan Stroetinga	16				40	40
3rd place, bronze medalist(s)	Jan Blokhuijsen	16				20	20
4	Willem Hoolwerf	16		1	5		6
5	Kars Jansman	16	5				5
6	Rémon Kwant	16		5			5
7	Ronald Kruijer	16	3				3
8	Casper de Gier	16			3		3
9	Arjen van der Kieft	16		3			3
10	Peter van de Pol	16	1				1
11	Luc ter Haar	16					0
12	Sjinkie Knegt	16					0
13	Sjaak Schipper	16					0
14	Mart Bruggink	16					0
15	Chris Huizinga	16					0
16	Jorjan Jorritsma	16					0
17	Marcel Bosker	16					0
18	Wesly Dijs	16					0
19	Mark Prinsen	16					0
20	Pim Schipper	16					0
21	Lex Dijkstra	16					0
22	Rick Schipper	16					0
23	Erik Valent	16					0
24	Chiel Smit	16					0
25	Kay Schipper	16					0
26	Tiemen van der Kolk	16					0
27	Robert Post	16					0
28	Simon Schouten	15		1			0
29	Thomas Geerdinck	2					0
NC	Gerben Jorritsma	DNS					

Source: Source:
