= 2015 KNSB Dutch Single Distance Championships =

KNSB Dutch Single Distance Championships
- Venue: Thialf, Heerenveen
- Dates: 31 October 2014 – 2 November 2014

The 2015 KNSB Dutch Single Distance Championships were held at the Thialf ice skating rink in Heerenveen from Friday 31 October 2014 to Sunday 2 November 2014. Although the tournament was held in 2014 it was the 2015 edition as it is part of the 2014–2015 speed skating season.

== Schedule ==
Schedule
Date	Starting time	Event
Friday; 30 October 2014	14:25	Men's 500 meter (1); Women's 5000 meter Men's 500 meter {2); Women's 1500 meter
Saturday; 1 November 2014	14:00	Women's 500 meter (1); Women's 3000 meter Women's 500 meter (2); Men's 1500 meter
Sunday; 2 November 2014	12:15	Women's 5000 meter Men's 10.000 meter Women's 1000 meter Men's 1000 meter

== Medalists ==
=== Men ===
Distance	Gold		Silver		Bronze	
2*500m details	Jan Smeekens	69.870 35.02–34.85	Michel Mulder	70.380 35.15–35.23	Pim Schipper	70.590 35.41–35.18
1000m details	Kjeld Nuis	1:08.25	Stefan Groothuis	1:08.56	Koen Verweij	1:09.15
1500m details	Sven Kramer	1:46.14	Koen Verweij	1:46.478	Thomas Krol	1:46.479
5000m details	Sven Kramer	6:16.60	Jorrit Bergsma	6:18.49	Wouter olde Heuvel	6:21.47
10000m details	Jorrit Bergsma	12:59.16	Bob de Jong	13:07.98	Erik Jan Kooiman	13:09.84

=== Women ===
Distance	Gold		Silver		Bronze	
2*500m details	Margot Boer	76.700 38.31–38.39	Thijsje Oenema	76.890 38.52–38.37	Bo van der Werff	77.450 38.84–38.61
1000m details	Marrit Leenstra	1:15.17	Ireen Wüst	1:15.28	Laurine van Riessen	1:16.59
1500m details	Ireen Wüst	1:55.43	Marrit Leenstra	1:57.27	Antoinette de Jong	1:57.54
3000m details	Ireen Wüst	4:04.50	Jorien Voorhuis	4:06.00	Carlijn Achtereekte	4:07.13
5000m details	Carien Kleibeuker	7:00.67	Carlijn Achtereekte	7:02.45	Jorien Voorhuis	7:03.54
