= 2016 KNSB Dutch Sprint Championships =

KNSB Dutch Sprint Championships
- Venue: Thialf, Heerenveen
- Dates: 22 January – 23 January 2016
- Competitors: 24 men 24 women

Medalist men
1st place, gold medalist(s)		Kai Verbij	NED
2nd place, silver medalist(s)		Ronald Mulder	NED
3rd place, bronze medalist(s)		Gerben Jorritsma	NED

Medalist women
1st place, gold medalist(s)		Sanneke de Neeling	NED
2nd place, silver medalist(s)		Marrit Leenstra	NED
3rd place, bronze medalist(s)		Margot Boer	NED

The 2016 KNSB Dutch Sprint Championships in speed skating were held in Heerenveen at the Thialf ice skating rink from 22 January to 23 January 2016. The tournament was part of the 2015–2016 speed skating season. Kai Verbij and Sanneke de Neeling won the sprint titles. The sprint championships were held at the same time as the 2016 KNSB Dutch Allround Championships.

== Schedule ==
Friday 22 January 2016	Saturday 23 January 2016
500 meter women sprint 1st run 500 meter men sprint 1st run 1000 meter women sprint 1st run 1000 meter men sprint 1st run	500 meter women sprint 2nd run 500 meter men sprint 2nd run 1000 meter women sprint 2nd run 1000 meter men sprint 2nd run

== Medalist ==
Event	Gold		Silver		Bronze	
Women's Sprint overall	Sanneke de Neeling	154.065	Marrit Leenstra	154.155	Margot Boer	155.530
Men's Sprint overall	Kai Verbij	139.440	Ronald Mulder	140.260	Gerben Jorritsma	140.440

=== Men's sprint ===
Event	1st place, gold medalist(s)	2nd place, silver medalist(s)	3rd place, bronze medalist(s)
Classification	Kai Verbij	Ronald Mulder	Gerben Jorritsma
500 meter (1st)	Ronald Mulder	Hein Otterspeer	Jan Smeekens
1000 meter (1st)	Kai Verbij	Gerben Jorritsma	Thomas Krol
500 meter (2nd)	Dai Dai N'tab	Kai Verbij; Jan Smeekens	
1000 meter (2nd)	Kai Verbij	Gerben Jorritsma	Hein Otterspeer

=== Women's sprint ===
Event	1st place, gold medalist(s)	2nd place, silver medalist(s)	3rd place, bronze medalist(s)
Classification	Sanneke de Neeling	Marrit Leenstra	Margot Boer
500 meter (1st)	Margot Boer	Sanneke de Neeling	Janine Smit
1000 meter (1st)	Sanneke de Neeling	Marrit Leenstra	Ireen Wüst
500 meter (2nd)	Margot Boer	Floor van den Brandt	Janine Smit
1000 meter (2nd)	Marrit Leenstra	Ireen Wüst	Sanneke de Neeling

== Classification ==
=== Men's sprint ===
Position	Skater	500m	1000m	500m	1000m	Total points Samalog
1st place, gold medalist(s)	Kai Verbij	35.26 (4)	1:09.12 (1)	35.05 (2)	1:09.14 (1)	139.440
2nd place, silver medalist(s)	Ronald Mulder	34.92 (1)	1:10.04 (7)	35.25 (6)	1:10.14 (9)	140.260
3rd place, bronze medalist(s)	Gerben Jorritsma	35.45 (6)	1:09.32 (2)	35.61 (9)	1:09.44 (2)	140.440 PR
4	Pim Schipper	35.48 (7)	1:09.81 (5)	35.43 (7)	1:09.47 (4)	140.550
5	Jesper Hospes	35.32 (5)	1:09.93 (6)	35.43 (7)	1:10.37 (11)	140.900
6	Michel Mulder	35.63 (11)	1:10.98 (12)	35.14 (4)	1:09.58 (5)	141.050
7	Thomas Krol	35.64 (12)	1:09.44 (3)	35.89 (13)	1:09.65 (6)	141.075
8	Sjoerd de Vries	35.59 (9)	1:09.64 (4)	36.01 (15)	1:10.08 (8)	141.460
9	Jan Smeekens	35.14 (3)	1:11.03 (13)	35.05 (2)	1:11.86 (15)	141.635
10	Lucas van Alphen	36.07 (16)	1:10.50 (9)	35.72 (11)	1:10.03 (7)	142.055
11	Martijn van Oosten	35.84 (14)	1:10.32 (8)	35.88 (12)	1:10.36 (10)	142.060
12	Dai Dai N'tab	35.61 (10)	1:12.25 (20)	35.03 (1)	1:11.30 (14)	142.415
13	Aron Romeijn	35.52 (8)	1:10.78 (10)	35.67 (10)	1:12.61 (18)	142.885
14	Thijs Roozen	36.13 (17)	1:10.92 (11)	36.35 (17)	1:11.21 (13)	143.545 PR
15	Thijs Govers	36.41 (18)	1:11.86 (18)	36.37 (18)	1:12.91 (20)	145.165
16	Wessel Schilders	36.57 (19)	1:11.78 (17) PR	36.64 (19)	1:12.81 (19)	145.505 PR
17	Sander Meijerink	36.91 (23)	1:11.35 (15) PR	36.97 (21)	1:12.05 (16)	145.580 PR
18	Alexander van Hasselt	36.79 (21)	1:11.93 (19)	36.74 (20)	1:12.31 (17)	145.650 PR
19	Frerik Scheffer	37.14 (24)	1:13.59 (23)	37.16 (22)	1:13.63 (21)	147.910
20	Joost Born	35.71 (13)	1:11.19 (14)	42.14 (23)	1:11.12 (12)	149.005
21	Hein Otterspeer	35.03 (2)	1:48.35 (24)	35.20 (5)	1:09.46 (3)	159.135
NC	Oscar van Leen	36.84 (22)	1:11.50 (16)	35.91 (14)	DQ	
NC	Niek Deelstra	36.02 (15)	1:12.60 (22)	36.25 (16)		
NC	Carlo Cesar	36.58 (20) PR	1:12.44 (21) PR	DQ		
WDR	Stefan Groothuis					
WDR	Arvin Wijsman					
WDR	Kjeld Nuis					

=== Women's sprint ===
Position	Skater	500m	1000m	500m	1000m	Total points Samalog
1st place, gold medalist(s)	Sanneke de Neeling	38.86 (2)	1:16.08 (1)	38.89 (4)	1:16.55 (3)	154.065
2nd place, silver medalist(s)	Marrit Leenstra	39.06 (6)	1:16.18 (2)	38.98 (7)	1:16.05 (1)	154.155
3rd place, bronze medalist(s)	Margot Boer	38.77 (1)	1:17.11 (5)	38.74 (1)	1:16.93 (5)	154.530
4	Anice Das	39.02 (5)	1:17.41 (7)	38.97 (5)	1:16.82 (4)	155.105
5	Janine Smit	38.92 (3)	1:17.30 (6)	38.82 (3)	1:17.45 (7)	155.115
6	Ireen Wüst	39.56 (11)	1:16.40 (3)	39.55 (12)	1:16.28 (2)	155.450
7	Annette Gerritsen	38.97 (4)	1:17.81 (8)	39.09 (8)	1:17.94 (9)	155.935
8	Roxanne van Hemert	39.56 (11)	1:16.96 (4)	39.42 (9)	1:17.27 (6)	156.095
9	Floor van den Brandt	39.16 (7)	1:18.57 (9)	38.75 (2)	1:18.48 (11)	156.435
10	Bo van der Werff	39.31 (8)	1:18.60 (10)	39.45 (10)	1:17.88 (8)	157.000
11	Rosa Pater	39.45 (9)	1:19.06 (13)	39.48 (11)	1:19.02 (13)	157.970 PR
12	Letitia de Jong	40.29 (18)	1:18.84 (12)	39.92 (13)	1:17.94 (9)	158.600
13	Mayon Kuipers	39.47 (10)	1:21.88 (24)	38.97 (5)	1:19.80 (16)	159.280
14	Manouk van Tol	40.26 (17)	1:18.80 (11)	40.29 (20)	1:18.67 (12)	159.285
15	Lotte van Beek	40.12 (16)	1:19.63 (14)	40.05 (15)	1:19.06 (14)	159.515
16	Tessa Boogaard	40.09 (15)	1:19.80 (15)	40.19 (18)	1:19.10 (15)	159.730
17	Maud van der Meer	40.57 (20)	1:19.97 (16) PR	40.27 (19) PR	1:20.22 (18)	160.935 PR
18	Bente van den Berge	39.69 (13)	1:21.41 (19)	39.99 (14)	1:21.11 (21)	160.940 PR
19	Aveline Hijlkema	40.61 (21)	1:20.36 (17)	40.35 (21)	1:19.98 (17)	161.130 PR
20	Leeyen Harteveld	40.67 (22)	1:20.78 (18)	40.88 (24)	1:20.50 (19)	162.190
21	Dione Voskamp	40.54 (19)	1:21.67 (22)	40.09 (17)	1:21.59 (22)	162.260
22	Danouk Bannink	40.77 (24)	1:21.50 (20)	40.54 (23)	1:21.09 (20)	162.605
23	Steffi Wubben	40.75 (23)	1:21.64 (21) PR	40.43 (22) PR	1:21.65 (23)	162.825 PR
NC	Moniek Klijnstra	39.75 (14)	1:21.84 (23)	40.06 (16)		120.730
