= 2015 KNSB Dutch Single Distance Championships – Men's 5000 m =

Dutch speed skating competition

- Venue: Thialf, Heerenveen
- Dates: 31 October 2014
- Competitors: 20 skaters

Medalist men
1st place, gold medalist(s)		Sven Kramer	NED
2nd place, silver medalist(s)		Jorrit Bergsma	NED
3rd place, bronze medalist(s)		Wouter olde Heuvel	NED

The men's 5000 meter at the 2015 KNSB Dutch Single Distance Championships took place in Heerenveen at the Thialf ice skating rink on Friday 31 October 2014. There were 20 participants.

== Statistics ==
=== Result ===
Position	Skater	Heat	Lane	Time
1st place, gold medalist(s)	Sven Kramer	10	O	6:16.60
2nd place, silver medalist(s)	Jorrit Bergsma	9	O	6:18.49
3rd place, bronze medalist(s)	Wouter olde Heuvel	8	O	6:21.47
4	Douwe de Vries	8	I	6:22.42
5	Bob de Jong	10	I	6:23.84
6	Koen Verweij	7	O	6:26.06
7	Frank Vreugdenhil	6	O	6:29.00
8	Arjan Stroetinga	2	O	6:29.11
9	Erik Jan Kooiman	4	I	6:29.58
10	Bob de Vries	5	O	6:29.86
11	Robert Bovenhuis	3	O	6:30.61
12	Evert Hoolwerf	2	I	6:30.67 PR
13	Arjen van der Kieft	4	O	6:31.98
14	Simon Schouten	1	O	6:33.38
15	Renz Rotteveel	5	I	6:37.21
16	Jos de Vos	6	I	6:37.73
17	Maurice Vriend	3	I	6:38.54
18	Rob Hadders	7	I	6:42.07
19	Frank Hermans	1	I	6:43.53
NC	Jan Blokhuijsen	9	I	DNF

Referee: Jan Bolt
Starter: Janny Smegen
Start: 15:13 hr. Finish: 16:51 hr.

=== Draw ===
Heat	Inside lane	Outside lane
1	Frank Hermans	Simon Schouten
2	Evert Hoolwerf	Arjan Stroetinga
3	Maurice Vriend	Robert Bovenhuis
4	Erik Jan Kooiman	Arjen van der Kieft
5	Renz Rotteveel	Bob de Vries
6	Jos de Vos	Frank Vreugdenhil
7	Rob Hadders	Koen Verweij
8	Douwe de Vries	Wouter olde Heuvel
9	Jan Blokhuijsen	Jorrit Bergsma
10	Bob de Jong	Sven Kramer
