= 2013 KNSB Dutch Sprint Championships =

Speed skating event in Grongingen

KNSB Dutch Sprint Championships
- Venue: Kardinge, Groningen
- Dates: 5 and 6 January 2013
- Competitors: 47

Medalist men
1st place, gold medalist(s)		Stefan Groothuis	NED
2nd place, silver medalist(s)		Michel Mulder	NED
3rd place, bronze medalist(s)		Hein Otterspeer	NED

Medalist women
1st place, gold medalist(s)		Marrit Leenstra	NED
2nd place, silver medalist(s)		Margot Boer	NED
3rd place, bronze medalist(s)		Laurine van Riessen	NED

The 2013 KNSB Dutch Sprint Championships in speed skating were held at the Kardinge ice stadium in Groningen, Netherlands. Stefan Groothuis and Margot Boer were the defending champions. Stefan Groothuis succeeded his title but Margot Boer lost hers to Marrit Leenstra. Stefan Groothuis got his 6th Dutch Sprint Championship title.

== Schedule ==
Schedule
Date	Event
5 January 2013	Women's 500m 1st run Men's 500m 1st run Women's 1000m 1st run Men's 1000m 1st run
6 January 2013	Women's 500m 2nd run Men's 500m 2nd run Women's 1000m 2nd run Men's 1000m 2nd run

== Medalist ==
Event	Gold		Silver		Bronze	
Women's Sprint	Marrit Leenstra	156.720	Margot Boer	156.875	Laurine van Riessen	157.530
Men's Sprint	Stefan Groothuis	141.695	Michel Mulder	141.715	Hein Otterspeer	141.765

== Results ==
=== Men's Sprint ===
Place	Athlete	500m	1000m	500m	1000m	Points
1st place, gold medalist(s)	Stefan Groothuis	35.71 (5)	1:10.21 (1)	0:35.70 (4)	1:10.36 (3)	141.695
2nd place, silver medalist(s)	Michel Mulder	35.45 (1)	1:10.50 (3)	35.84 (8)	1:10.35 (2)	141.715
3rd place, bronze medalist(s)	Hein Otterspeer	35.59 (4)	1:10.24 (2)	35.73 (5)	1:10.65 (5)	141.765
4	Mark Tuitert	35.97 (8)	1:10.56 (4)	35.75 (6)	1:10.13 (1)	142.065
5	Ronald Mulder	35.52 (3)	1:11.12 (5)	35.23 (1)	1:11.85 (10)	142.235
6	Kjeld Nuis	35.89 (6)	1:11.37(7)	35.62 (3)	1:10.91 (7)	142.650
7	Jan Smeekens	35.46 (2)	1:12.26 (11)	35.32 (2)	1:12.20 (14)	143.010
8	Sjoerd de Vries	36.21 (11)	1:11.22 (6)	35.90 (9)	1:10.58 (4)	143.010
9	Pim Schipper	36.02 (9)	1:11.50 (9)	36.08 (10)	1:10.90 (6)	143.300
10	Lucas van Alphen	36.62 (12)	1:11.43 (8)	36.49 (13)	1:11.11 (8)	144.375
11	Jesper Hospes	35.97 (7)	1:12.92 (15)	35.82 (7)	1:13.58 (19)	145.040
12	Lennart Velema	36.72 (13)	1:12.02 (10)	36.49 (12)	1:11.93 (12)	145.185
13	Kai Verbij	36.95 (15)	1:12.40 (13)	36.88 (17)	1:11.86 (11)	145.960
14	Rhian Ket	37.08 (21)	1:12.74 (14)	36.97 (18)	1:11.65 (9)	146.245
15	Thomas Krol	37.04 (19)	1:12.28 (12)	37.07 (20)	1:12.18 (13)	146.340
16	Jacques de Koning	36.10 (10)	1:15.66 (23)	36.13 (11)	1:13.09 (15)	146.605
17	Aron Romeijn	36.98 (17)	1:12.94 (16)	36.73 (16)	1:13.42 (17)	146.890
18	Lieuwe Mulder	37.07 (20)	1:13.12 (18)	36.72 (15)	1:13.27 (16)	146.985
19	Gerben Jorritsma	37.01 (18)	1:13.44 (20)	36.99 (19)	1:13.54 (18)	147.490
20	Frank Hermans	37.25 (22)	1:13.16 (19)	37.49 (21)	1:14.27 (21)	148.455
21	Pepijn van der Vinne	37.67 (23)	1:14.06 (21)	37.86 (23)	1:14.09 (20)	149.605
22	Allard Neijmeijer	36.82 (14)	1:16.06 (24)	36.57 (14)	1:17.89 (24)	150.365
23	Carlo Cesar	37.69 (24)	1:15.43 (22)	37.64 (22)	1:15.92 (23)	151.005
24	Guus Baan	36.97 (16)	1:13.10 (17)	1:24.85 (24)↓	1:14.48 (22)	195.610
NC	Koen Verweij	WDR

↓ Fell

Men's results: SchaatsStatistieken.nl

=== Women's Sprint ===
Place	Athlete	500m	1000m	500m	1000m	Points
1st place, gold medalist(s)	Marrit Leenstra	39.42 (4)	1:18.22 (2)	39.39 (4)	1:17.60 (1)	156.720
2nd place, silver medalist(s)	Margot Boer	39:18 (1)	1:18.74 (4)	38.98 (1)	1:18.69 (5)	156.875
3rd place, bronze medalist(s)	Laurine van Riessen	39.38 (3)	1:19.23 (7)	39.30 (2)	1:18.47 (4)	157.530
4	Thijsje Oenema	39.30 (2)	1:19.07 (5)	39.37 (3)	1:19.09 (6)	157.750
5	Ireen Wüst	39.98 (10)	1:17.58 (1)	40.12 (11)	1:17.74 (2)	157.760
6	Lotte van Beek	39.79 (6)	1:18.63 (3)	39.78 (7)	1:18.07 (3)	157.910
7	Anice Das	39.71 (5)	1:19.69 (8)	39.74 (5)	1:19.36 (8)	158.975
8	Natasja Bruintjes	39.88 (8)	1:19.22 (6)	40.11 (10)	1:19.20 (7)	159.200
9	Marit Dekker	40.15 (11)	1:20.24 (9)	39.79 (8)	1:20.90 (11)	160.510
10	Janine Smit	39.83 (7)	1:21.71 (17)	39.77 (6)	1:20.61 (10)	160.760
11	Irene Schouten	40.73 (17)	1:20.28 (10)	40.76 (16)	1:20.41 (9)	161.835
12	Floor van den Brandt	40.42 (13)	1:21.50 (14)	40.33 (12)	1:21.17 (14)	162.085
13	Bo van der Werff	40.48 (14)	1:21.56 (16)	40.51 (14)	1:21.14 (13)	162.340
14	Manon Kamminga	40.84 (18)	1:21.53 (15)	40.39 (13)	1:21.06 (12)	162.525
15	Mayon Kuipers	40.21 (12)	1:23.33 (21)	39.93 (9)	1:21.91 (16)	162.760
16	Rosa Pater	40.58 (15)	1:23.14 (19)	40.84 (18)	1:22.56 (18)	164.260
17	Roxanne van Hemert	41.29 (20)	1:21.45 (13)	41.27 (19)	1:22.06 (17)	164.315
18	Leslie Koen	40.87 (19)	1:23.30 (20)	40.67 (15)	1:23.15 (19)	164.765
19	Manouk van Tol	41.64 (22)	1:21.92 (18)	41.98 (21)	1:21.69 (15)	165.425
20	Cerise Tersteeg	41.59 (21)	1:23.63 (22)	41.49 (20)	1:23.44 (20)	166.615
NC	Letitia de Jong	40.67 (16)	1:20.42 (11)	40.81 (17)	DQ
NC	Annette Gerritsen	39.94 (9)	1:20.47 (12)	WDR

Women's results: SchaatsStatistieken.nl
