= 2013 KNSB Dutch Single Distance Championships – Men's 500 m =

Dutch speed skating competition

- Venue: Thialf, Heerenveen
- Dates: 9 November 2012
- Competitors: 24

Medalist men
1st place, gold medalist(s)		Michel Mulder	NED
2nd place, silver medalist(s)		Jan Smeekens	NED
3rd place, bronze medalist(s)		Hein Otterspeer	NED

The men's 500 meter at the 2013 KNSB Dutch Single Distance Championships took place in Heerenveen at the Thialf ice skating rink on Friday 9 November 2012. It consisted of twice 500 meter where the speed skaters started once in the inner and once in the outer lane. Although this tournament was held in 2012 it was part of the speed skating season 2012–2013. There were 24 participants.

== Statistics ==
=== Result ===
Position	Skater	Time 1st 500m	Time 2nd 500m	Total points Samalog
1st place, gold medalist(s)	Michel Mulder	34.96 (1)	34.98 (1)	69.940
2nd place, silver medalist(s)	Jan Smeekens	35.23 (3)	35.07 (2)	70.300
3rd place, bronze medalist(s)	Hein Otterspeer	35.18 (2)	35.14 (3)	70.320
4	Ronald Mulder	35.33 (5)	35.15 (4)	70.480
5	Kjeld Nuis	35.23 (3)	35.41 (5)	70.640
6	Jesper Hospes	35.61 (7)	35.47 (6)	71.080
7	Sjoerd de Vries	35.63 (8)	35.60 (7)	71.230
8	Stefan Groothuis	35.53 (6)	35.86 (10)	71.390
9	Allard Neijmeijer	35.81 (9) PR	35.84 (9)	71.650 PR
10	Pim Schipper	36.10 (10)	35.81 (8)	71.910
11	Lucas van Alphen	36.15 (11)	36.07 (12)	72.220 PR
12	Bas Bervoets	36.34 (13)	36.06 (11) PR	72.400 PR
13	Aron Romeijn	36.48 (15)	36.31 (13)	72.790
14	Kai Verbij	36.30 (12)	36.50 (16)	72.800
15	Freddy Wennemars	36.57 (18)	36.31 (13)	72.880
16	Thomas Krol	36.41 (14)	36.50 (16)	72.910
17	Lennart Velema	36.50 (17)	36.46 (15)	72.960
18	Rens Boekhoff	36.60 (19)	36.52 (18)	73.120
19	Lieuwe Mulder	36.645 (20)	36.541 (19)	73.186
19	Jesper van Veen	36.495 (16)	36.691 (20)	73.186
21	Rienk Nauta	37.03 (21)	36.88 (21)	73.910
22	Martijn van Oosten	37.03 (21)	36.89 (22)	73.920
23	Cornelius Kersten	37.13 (23)	42.20 (23)	79.330
NC	Jacques de Koning	DQ		

=== Draw 1st 500 meter ===
Heat	Inside lane	Outside lane
1	Martijn van Oosten	Freddy Wennemars
2	Cornelius Kersten	Lieuwe Mulder
3	Aron Romeijn	Rienk Nauta
4	Lennart Velema	Thomas Krol
5	Allard Neijmeijer	Jesper van Veen
6	Lucas van Alphen	Jacques de Koning
7	Bas Bervoets	Pim Schipper
8	Kai Verbij	Rens Boekhoff
9	Sjoerd de Vries	Stefan Groothuis
10	Jesper Hospes	Ronald Mulder
11	Kjeld Nuis	Michel Mulder
12	Hein Otterspeer	Jan Smeekens

=== Draw 2nd 500 meter ===
Heat	Inside lane	Outside lane
1		Cornelius Kersten
2	Rienk Nauta	Martijn van Oosten
3	Lieuwe Mulder	Lennart Velema
4	Rens Boekhoff	Aron Romeijn
5	Freddy Wennemars	Bas Bervoets
6	Jesper van Veen	Kai Verbij
7	Thomas Krol	Lucas van Alphen
8	Pim Schipper	Allard Neijmeijer
9	Stefan Groothuis	Sjoerd de Vries
10	Ronald Mulder	Jesper Hospes
11	Jan Smeekens	Kjeld Nuis
12	Michel Mulder	Hein Otterspeer
