= 2017 KNSB Dutch Single Distance Championships =

KNSB Dutch Single Distance Championships
- Venue: Thialf, Heerenveen
- Dates: 28–30 December 2016

The 2017 KNSB Dutch Single Distance Championships were held at the Thialf ice skating rink in Heerenveen from Wednesday 28 December 2016 to Friday 30 December 2016. Although the tournament was held in 2016 it was the 2017 edition as it was part of the 2016–2017 speed skating season.

== Schedule ==
Schedule
Date	Starting time	Event
Wednesday; 28 December 2016	16:30	Men's 5000 meter Men's 500 meter Women's 1500 meter
Thursday; 29 December 2016	17:00	Women's 3000 meter Women's 500 meter Men's 1500 meter
Friday; 30 December 2016	15:20	Women's 5000 meter Men's 10.000 meter Women's 1000 meter Men's 1000 meter Women's Mass start Men's Mass start

== Medalists ==
=== Men ===
Distance	Gold		Silver		Bronze	
500m details	Dai Dai Ntab	34.80	Ronald Mulder	34.83	Jan Smeekens	34.91
1000m details	Kai Verbij	1:08.22	Kjeld Nuis	1:08.54	Ronald Mulder	1:09.40
1500m details	Sven Kramer	1:45.82	Kjeld Nuis	1:46.05	Patrick Roest	1:46.15
5000m details	Sven Kramer	6:14.17	Jorrit Bergsma	6:18.08	Douwe de Vries	6:18.51
10000m details	Jorrit Bergsma	12:52.34	Sven Kramer	12:53.59	Bob de Vries	13:01.93
Mass start details	Gary Hekman	60 points	Arjan Stroetinga	40 points	Jan Blokhuijsen	20 points

=== Women ===
Distance	Gold		Silver		Bronze	
500m details	Jorien ter Mors	38.48	Floor van den Brandt	38.66	Anice Das	38.79
1000m details	Jorien ter Mors	1:15.15	Marrit Leenstra	1:15.25	Ireen Wüst	1:15.98
1500m details	Ireen Wüst	1:57.19	Jorien ter Mors	1:57.47	Marrit Leenstra	1:57.75
3000m details	Ireen Wüst	4:02.31	Antoinette de Jong	4:02.76	Yvonne Nauta	4:04.50
5000m details	Carien Kleibeuker	6:58.78	Antoinette de Jong	6:59.79	Carlijn Achtereekte	7:00.83
Mass start details	Irene Schouten	60 points	Melissa Wijfje	40 points	Suzanne Schulting	20 points
