= 2017 KNSB Dutch Single Distance Championships – Women's mass start =

Dutch speed skating competition

2017 KNSB Dutch Single Distance Championships – Women's Mass Start
- Venue: Thialf, Heerenveen
- Dates: 30 December 2016
- Competitors: 32 skaters

Medalist women
1st place, gold medalist(s)		Irene Schouten	NED
2nd place, silver medalist(s)		Melissa Wijfje	NED
3rd place, bronze medalist(s)		Suzanne Schulting	NED

The women's Mass Start at the 2017 KNSB Dutch Single Distance Championships in Heerenveen took place at Thialf ice skating rink on Friday 30 December 2016.

== Result ==
Rank	Skater	Rounds	sprint 1	sprint 2	sprint 3	sprint 4	Total points
1st place, gold medalist(s)	Irene Schouten	16				60	60
2nd place, silver medalist(s)	Melissa Wijfje	16				40	40
3rd place, bronze medalist(s)	Suzanne Schulting	16				20	20
4	Imke Vormeer	16			5		5
5	Elma de Vries	16	5				5
6	Jade van der Molen	16			3		3
7	Carien Kleibeuker	16	3				3
8	Tessa Witteman	16		3			3
9	Janneke Ensing	16			1		1
10	Esther Kiel	16	1				1
11	Marijke Groenewoud	16					0
12	Annouk van der Weijden	16					0
13	Manon Kamminga	16					0
14	Carla Ketellapper-Zielman	16					0
15	Lisa van der Geest	16					0
16	Kelly Schouten	16					0
17	Margo van de Merwe	16					0
18	Carlijn Achtereekte	16					0
19	Emma Engbers	16					0
20	Bianca Roosenboom	16					0
21	Femke Markus	16					0
22	Merel Bosma	16					0
23	Sanne van der Schaar	16					0
24	Corina Strikwerda	16					0
25	Sanne in 't Hof	16					0
26	Elisa Dul	16					0
27	Rianne de Vries	16					0
28	Jessica Merkens	15		5			0
29	Aggie Walsma	15		1			0
30	Moniek Klijnstra	14					0
31	Annemarie Boer	14					0
32	Willemijn Cnossen	14					0
