= 2017 KNSB Dutch Single Distance Championships – Men's 1000 m =

- Venue: Thialf, Heerenveen
- Dates: 30 December 2016
- Competitors: 22

Medalist men
1st place, gold medalist(s)		Kai Verbij	NED
2nd place, silver medalist(s)		Kjeld Nuis	NED
3rd place, bronze medalist(s)		Ronald Mulder	NED

The men's 1000 meter at the Dutch Single Distance Championships 2017 took place in Heerenveen at the Thialf ice skating rink on Friday 30 December 2016. There were 22 participants.

== Statistics ==
=== Result ===
Position	Skater	Heat	Lane	Time
1st place, gold medalist(s)	Kai Verbij	11	I	1:08.22
2nd place, silver medalist(s)	Kjeld Nuis	10	I	1:08.54
3rd place, bronze medalist(s)	Ronald Mulder	11	O	1:09.40
4	Koen Verweij	2	O	1:09.48
5	Pim Schipper	10	O	1:09.68
6	Thomas Krol	9	I	1:09.80
7	Sjoerd de Vries	7	I	1:09.83
8	Lennart Velema	4	I	1:09.85
9	Hein Otterspeer	9	O	1:09.92
10	Dai Dai Ntab	3	I	1:09.94 PR
11	Gerben Jorritsma	7	O	1:10.14
12	Martijn van Oosten	4	O	1:10.44
13	Lucas van Alphen	8	O	1:10.55
14	Jan Smeekens	8	I	1:10.78
15	Gijs Esders	3	O	1:10.85
16	Joost Born	6	I	1:10.86
17	Thijs Roozen	5	I	1:10.94
18	Wesly Dijs	5	O	1:11.04
19	Aron Romeijn	6	O	1:11.19
20	Sander Meijerink	2	I	1:11.42
21	Marcel Bosker	1	O	1:11.70 PR
22	Niek Deelstra	1	I	1:11.74 PR
NC	Michel Mulder	WDR		

Referee: Dina Melis Starter: André de Vries
Start: 19:12 hr. Finish: 19:38 hr.

=== Draw ===
Heat	Inside lane	Outside lane
1	Niek Deelstra	Marcel Bosker
2	Sander Meijerink	Koen Verweij
3	Dai Dai Ntab	Gijs Esders
4	Lennart Velema	Martijn van Oosten
5	Thijs Roozen	Wesly Dijs
6	Joost Born	Aron Romeijn
7	Sjoerd de Vries	Gerben Jorritsma
8	Jan Smeekens	Lucas van Alphen
9	Thomas Krol	Hein Otterspeer
10	Kjeld Nuis	Pim Schipper
11	Kai Verbij	Ronald Mulder
