= 2015 KNSB Dutch Single Distance Championships – Men's 1500 m =

- Venue: Thialf, Heerenveen
- Dates: 31 October 2014
- Competitors: 24 skaters

Medalist men
1st place, gold medalist(s)		Sven Kramer	NED
2nd place, silver medalist(s)		Koen Verweij	NED
3rd place, bronze medalist(s)		Thomas Krol	NED

The men's 1500 meter at the 2015 KNSB Dutch Single Distance Championships took place in Heerenveen at the Thialf ice skating rink on Friday 31 October 2014. There were 24 participants.

== Statistics ==
=== Result ===
Position	Skater	Heat	Lane	Time
1st place, gold medalist(s)	Sven Kramer	10	O	1:46.14
2nd place, silver medalist(s)	Koen Verweij	10	I	1:46.47(8)
3rd place, bronze medalist(s)	Thomas Krol	5	I	1:46.47(9)
4	Kjeld Nuis	9	O	1:46.89
5	Wouter olde Heuvel	9	I	1:46.95
6	Pim Schipper	6	O	1:47.11
7	Kai Verbij	7	O	1:47.53
8	Jan Blokhuijsen	12	O	1:47.61
9	Douwe de Vries	12	I	1:47.83
10	Maurice Vriend	8	O	1:48.04
11	Stefan Groothuis	11	O	1:48.23
12	Thijs Roozen	3	O	1:48.92
13	Jos de Vos	5	O	1:49.30
14	Wesly Dijs	2	O	1:49.48
15	Marcel Bosker	3	I	1:49.56
16	Sjoerd de Vries	7	I	1:49.65
17	Gerben Jorritsma	2	I	1:49.72(1)
18	Renz Rotteveel	11	I	1:49.72(4)
19	Patrick Roest	1	I	1:49.73
20	Lucas van Alphen	6	I	1:49.95
21	Peter Groen	4	O	1:50.01
22	Frank Hermans	8	I	1:50.39
23	Alexander van Hasselt	1	O	1:51.33
24	Dedjer Wymenga	4	I	1:52.55

Referee: Jan Bolt. Starter: Janny Smegen
Start: 17.04hr. Finish: 17.39hr.

=== Draw ===
Heat	Inside lane	Outside lane
1	Patrick Roest	Alexander van Hasselt
2	Gerben Jorritsma	Wesly Dijs
3	Marcel Bosker	Thijs Roozen
4	Dedjer Wymenga	Peter Groen
5	Thomas Krol	Jos de Vos
6	Lucas van Alphen	Pim Schipper
7	Sjoerd de Vries	Kai Verbij
8	Frank Hermans	Maurice Vriend
9	Wouter olde Heuvel	Kjeld Nuis
10	Koen Verweij	Sven Kramer
11	Renz Rotteveel	Stefan Groothuis
12	Douwe de Vries	Jan Blokhuijsen
