= 2010 KNSB Dutch Sprint Championships =

KNSB Dutch Sprint Championships
- Venue: Kardinge, Groningen
- Dates: 9 and 10 January 2010
- Competitors: 42

Medalist men
| 1st place, gold medalist(s) | | Stefan Groothuis | NED |
| 2nd place, silver medalist(s) | | Mark Tuitert | NED |
| 3rd place, bronze medalist(s) | | Beorn Nijenhuis | NED |

Medalist women
| 1st place, gold medalist(s) | | Annette Gerritsen | NED |
| 2nd place, silver medalist(s) | | Margot Boer | NED |
| 3rd place, bronze medalist(s) | | Laurine van Riessen | NED |

The 2010 KNSB Dutch Sprint Championships in speed skating were held at the Kardinge ice stadium in Groningen, Netherlands.

== Schedule ==
Schedule
| Date | Event |
| 9 January 2010 | Women's 500m 1st run Men's 500m 1st run Women's 1000m 1st run Men's 1000m 1st run |
| 10 January 2010 | Women's 500m 2nd run Men's 500m 2nd run Women's 1000m 2nd run Men's 1000m 2nd run |

== Medalist ==
| Event | Gold | | Silver | | Bronze | |
|---|---|---|---|---|---|---|
| Women's Sprint | Annette Gerritsen | 158.630 | Margot Boer | 158.960 | Laurine van Riessen | 159.665 |
| Men's Sprint | Stefan Groothuis | 143.380 | Mark Tuitert | 144.850 | Beorn Nijenhuis | 144.920 |

== Results ==
=== Men's Sprint ===
| Place | Athlete | 500m | 1000m | 500m | 1000m | Points |
|---|---|---|---|---|---|---|
| 1st place, gold medalist(s) | Stefan Groothuis | 36.22 (2) | 1:10.93 (1) | 36.32 (2) | 1:10.75 (1) | 143.380 |
| 2nd place, silver medalist(s) | Mark Tuitert | 36.62 (6) | 1:12.02 (3) | 36.58 (5) | 1:11.28 (2) | 144.850 |
| 3rd place, bronze medalist(s) | Beorn Nijenhuis | 36.56 (5) | 1:11.90 (2) | 36.67 (9) | 1:11.48 (3) | 144.920 |
| 4 | Jan Smeekens | 36.15 (1) | 1:13.29 (8) | 36.01 (1) | 1:13.18 (10) | 145.395 |
| 5 | Kjeld Nuis | 36.81 (11) | 1:12.54 (4) | 36.54 (4) | 1:11.79 (4) | 145.515 |
| 6 | Sietse Heslinga | 36.63 (7) | 1:12.91 (5) | 36.53 (3) | 1:12.83 (7) | 146.030 |
| 7 | Michel Mulder | 36.50 (3) | 1:13.14 (6) | 36.65 (8) | 1:12.84 (8) | 146.140 |
| 8 | Pim Schipper | 36.66 (8) | 1:13.54 (10) | 36.70 (10) | 1:12.50 (5) | 146.380 |
| 9 | Sjoerd de Vries | 37.12 (14) | 1:13.50 (9) | 36.63 (7) | 1:12.63 (6) | 146.815 |
| 10 | Michael Poot | 36.74 (9) | 1:14.61 (16) | 36.61 (6) | 1:13.48 (12) | 147.395 |
| 11 | Tim Salomons | 37.42 (19) | 1:13.68 (12) | 37.17 (14) | 1:12.97 (9) | 147.915 |
| 12 | Rens Boekhoff | 37.11 (13) | 1:13.96 (14) | 37.17 (14) | 1:13.42 (11) | 147.970 |
| 13 | Berden de Vries | 37.39 (18) | 1:13.58 (11) | 37.11 (12) | 1:13.71 (13) | 148.145 |
| 14 | Rhian Ket | 37.19 (15) | 1:13.27 (7) | 37.16 (13) | 1:14.40 (17) | 148.185 |
| 15 | Huub van der Wart | 37.20 (16) | 1:14.84 (17) | 37.19 (17) | 1:14.17 (15) | 148.895 |
| 16 | Jesper Hospes | 37.10 (12) | 1:15.21 (22) | 36.74 (11) | 1:15.10 (21) | 148.995 |
| 17 | Hein Otterspeer | 37.23 (17) | 1:14.86 (18) | 37.18 (16) | 1:14.68 (20) | 149.180 |
| 18 | Freddy Wennemars | 37.51 (20) | 1:14.86 (18) | 37.19 (17) | 1:14.16 (14) | 149.210 |
| 19 | Bram Smallenbroek | 37.70 (23) | 1:14.48 (15) | 37.34 (19) | 1:14.42 (18) | 149.490 |
| 20 | Maarten Hitman | 37.65 (22) | 1:14.89 (20) | 37.47 (20) | 1:14.52 (19) | 149.825 |
| 21 | Demian Roelofs | 37.62 (21) | 1:15.04 (21) | 37.66 (21) | 1:14.24 (16) | 149.920 |
| 22 | Jesper van Veen | 37.82 (24) | 1:16.57 (23) | 37.79 (22) | 1:16.07 (22) | 151.930 |
| DNS3 | Simon Kuipers | 36.50 (3) | 1:13.68 (12) | DNS | DNS | 73.340 |
| DNS2 | Remco olde Heuvel | 36.76 (10) | DNS | DNS | DNS | 36.760 |

Note:
DNS = Did Not Start

Men's results: SchaatsStatistieken.nl

=== Women's Sprint ===
| Place | Athlete | 500m | 1000m | 500m | 1000m | Points |
|---|---|---|---|---|---|---|
| 1st place, gold medalist(s) | Annette Gerritsen | 39.49 (1) | 1:19.61 (1) | 39.49 (2) | 1:19.69 (3) | 158.630 |
| 2nd place, silver medalist(s) | Margot Boer | 39.65 (2) | 1:20.58 (3) | 39.43 (1) | 1:19.18 (1) | 158.960 |
| 3rd place, bronze medalist(s) | Laurine van Riessen | 39.95 (4) | 1:20.47 (2) | 39.81 (3) | 1:19.34 (2) | 159.665 |
| 4 | Sanne van der Star | 40.66 (5) | 1:22.11 (7) | 40.81 (4) | 1:21.25 (6) | 163.150 |
| 5 | Lotte van Beek | 41.30 (9) | 1:21.80 (4) | 40.85 (5) | 1:20.22 (4) | 163.160 |
| 6 | Janine Smit | 41.25 (7) | 1:22.75 (11) | 40.88 (6) | 1:21.41 (7) | 164.210 |
| 7 | Roxanne van Hemert | 41.38 (12) | 1:21.95 (5) | 41.52 (10) | 1:21.02 (5) | 164.385 |
| 8 | Frederika Buwalda | 41.20 (6) | 1:22.25 (10) | 41.15 (7) | 1:22.42 (10) | 164.685 |
| 9 | Marrit Leenstra | 41.30 (9) | 1:22.13 (8) | 41.82 (13) | 1:22.82 (12) | 165.595 |
| 10 | Linda de Vries | 42.04 (17) | 1:22.05 (6) | 41.78 (11) | 1:21.53 (8) | 165.610 |
| 11 | Maren van Spronsen | 41.53 (14) | 1:23.10 (13) | 41.49 (9) | 1:22.19 (9) | 165.665 |
| 12 | Floor van den Brandt | 41.26 (8) | 1:23.84 (15) | 41.25 (8) | 1:22.69 (11) | 165.775 |
| 13 | Jorien Kranenborg | 41.59 (16) | 1:24.46 (17) | 41.79 (12) | 1:24.34 (14) | 167.780 |
| 14 | Brecht Kramer | 41.33 (11) | 1:24.21 (16) | 42.25 (14) | 1:24.68 (15) | 168.025 |
| 15 | Sanne Delfgou | 42.61 (18) | 1:24.63 (18) | 42.38 (15) | 1:23.46 (13) | 169.035 |
| DQ3 | Anice Das | 41.43 (13) | 1:22.85 (12) | DQ | DNS | 82.850 |
| DNS3 | Thijsje Oenema | 39.93 (3) | 1:22.19 (9) | DNS | DNS | 81.025 |
| DNS3 | Tosca Hilbrands | 41.57 (15) | 1:23.59 (14) | DNS | DNS | 83.365 |

Note:
DNS = Did Not Start
DQ = Disqualified

Women's results: SchaatsStatistieken.nl
