= Igor Bogolyubskiy =

Russian speed skater (born 1985)

Personal information
- Born: 27 May 1985 (age 41) Chelyabinsk, Russian SSR, Soviet Union
- Height: 1.80 m (5 ft 11 in)
- Weight: 81 kg (179 lb)

Sport
- Country: Russia
- Sport: Speed skating

Achievements and titles
- Highest world ranking: No. 37 (500m)

Igor Bogolyubskiy (born 27 May 1985) is a Russian speed skater.

Bogolyubskiy competed at the 2014 Winter Olympics for Russia. In the 1000 metres he finished 39th overall.

Bogolyubskiy made his World Cup debut in November 2011. As of September 2014, Bogolyubskiy's top World Cup finish is 2nd in a 500m B race at Inzell in 2013–14. His best overall finish in the World Cup is 37th, in a pair of 500m seasons.
