= 2017 KNSB Dutch Single Distance Championships – Men's 500 m =

Dutch speed skating competition

- Venue: Thialf, Heerenveen
- Dates: 28 December 2016
- Competitors: 20 skaters

Medalist men
1st place, gold medalist(s)		Dai Dai N'tab	NED
2nd place, silver medalist(s)		Ronald Mulder	NED
3rd place, bronze medalist(s)		Jan Smeekens	NED

The men's 500 meter at the 2017 KNSB Dutch Single Distance Championships took place in Heerenveen at the Thialf ice skating rink on Wednesday 28 December 2016. Although the tournament was held in 2016 it was part of the 2016–2017 speed skating season. There were 20 participants.

== Statistics ==
=== Result ===
Position	Skater	Heat	Lane	Time
1st place, gold medalist(s)	Dai Dai N'tab	10	I	34.80
2nd place, silver medalist(s)	Ronald Mulder	8	O	34.83
3rd place, bronze medalist(s)	Jan Smeekens	8	I	34.91
4	Kjeld Nuis	6	I	34.93
5	Kai Verbij	9	I	34.98
6	Michel Mulder	9	O	35.23
7	Hein Otterspeer	10	O	35.35
8	Pim Schipper	5	O	35.57
9	Martijn van Oosten	7	O	35.68
10	Thomas Krol	5	I	35.74
11	Gerben Jorritsma	7	I	35.75(1)
12	Joost Born	3	O	35.75(2)
13	Niek Deelstra	2	O	35.83
14	Gijs Esders	4	I	35.97(3)
15	Lennart Velema	2	I	35.97(5)
16	Lucas van Alphen	4	O	35.99
17	Aron Romeijn	6	O	36.12
18	Rudy Meereboer	3	I	36.36 PR
19	Sander Meijerink	1	O	36.56 PR
20	Joost van Dobbenburgh	1	I	37.07
NC	Jesper Hospes	WDR		

=== Draw ===
Heat	Inside lane	Outside lane
1	Joost van Dobbenburgh	Sander Meijerink
2	Lennart Velema	Niek Deelstra
3	Rudy Meereboer	Joost Born
4	Gijs Esders	Lucas van Alphen
5	Thomas Krol	Pim Schipper
6	Kjeld Nuis	Aron Romeijn
7	Gerben Jorritsma	Martijn van Oosten
8	Jan Smeekens	Ronald Mulder
9	Kai Verbij	Michel Mulder
10	Dai Dai N'tab	Hein Otterspeer

Referee: Dina Melis. Starter: André de Vries
Start: 19:19hr. Finish: 19:46hr.
