= 2010 KNSB Dutch Single Distance Championships – Men's 500 m =

Dutch speed skating competition

- Venue: Thialf, Heerenveen
- Dates: 30 October – 1 November 2009
- Competitors: 24

Medalist men
1st place, gold medalist(s)		Jan Smeekens	NED
2nd place, silver medalist(s)		Ronald Mulder	NED
3rd place, bronze medalist(s)		Mark Tuitert	NED

The men's 500 meter at the 2010 KNSB Dutch Single Distance Championships took place in Heerenveen at the Thialf ice skating rink on 30 October – 1 November 2009. It consisted of twice 500 meter where the speed skaters started once in the inner and once in the outer lane. Although this tournament was held in 2009 it was part of the speed skating season 2009–2010. There were 24 participants.

== Statistics ==
=== Result ===
Position	Skater	Time 1st 500m	Time 2nd 500m	Total points Samalog
1st place, gold medalist(s)	Jan Smeekens	35.23 (1)	35.55 (7)	70.780
2nd place, silver medalist(s)	Ronald Mulder	35.47 (2)	35.33 (1)	70.800
3rd place, bronze medalist(s)	Mark Tuitert	35.54 (3)	35.47 (4)	71.010
4	Stefan Groothuis	35.64 (5)	35.47 (3)	71.110
5	Lars Elgersma	35.59 (4)	35.54 (6)	71.130
6	Simon Kuipers	35.79 (8)	35.39 (2)	71.180
7	Michel Mulder	35.83 (10)	35.52 (5)	71.350
8	Jan Bos	35.66 (6)	35.71 (9)	71.370
9	Jacques de Koning	35.73 (7)	35.73 (10)	71.460
10	Pim Schipper	35.83 (9)	35.78 (12)	71.610
11	Erben Wennemars	36.07 (13)	35.66 (8)	71.730
12	Michael Poot	35.97 (12)	35.78 (11)	71.750
13	Beorn Nijenhuis	35.89 (11)	36.03 (14)	71.920
14	Sietse Heslinga	36.13 (15)	35.91 (13)	72.040 PR
15	Hein Otterspeer	36.13 (14) PR	36.17 (17)	72.300
16	Kjeld Nuis	36.25 (17) PR	36.06 (15) PR	72.310
17	Jurre Trouw	36.18 (16)	36.29 (18)	72.470
18	Sjoerd de Vries	36.36 (18)	36.12 (16)	72.480
19	Jesper Hospes	36.37 (19)	36.32 (19)	72.690
20	Freddy Wennemars	36.38 (20)	36.33 (20)	72.710
21	Maarten Hitman	36.45 (22)	36.49 (22)	72.940 PR
22	Tim Salomons	36.44 (21)	36.51 (23)	72.950
23	Huub van de Wart	36.49 (23)	36.49 (21)	72.980
24	Allard Neijmeijer	36.68 (24)	37.33 (24)	74.010

=== Draw 1st 500 meter ===
Heat	Inside lane	Outside lane
1	Maarten Hitman	Jurre Trouw
2	Kjeld Nuis	Allard Neijmeijer
3	Freddy Wennemars	Pim Schipper
4	Huub van der Wart	Hein Otterspeer
5	Tim Salomons	Ronald Mulder
6	Sietse Heslinga	Michel Mulder
7	Jesper Hospes	Sjoerd de Vries
8	Erben Wennemars	Michael Poot
9	Mark Tuitert	Lars Elgersma
10	Jan Bos	Beorn Nijenhuis
11	Jacques de Koning	Simon Kuipers
12	Stefan Groothuis	Jan Smeekens

=== Draw 2nd 500 meter ===
Heat	Inside lane	Outside lane
1	Allard Neijmeijer	Huub van der Wart
2	Sjoerd de Vries	Maarten Hitman
3	Jurre Trouw	Tim Salomons
4	Hein Otterspeer	Freddy Wennemars
5	Michael Poot	Jesper Hospes
6	Beorn Nijenhuis	Kjeld Nuis
7	Michel Mulder	Sietse Heslinga
8	Pim Schipper	Erben Wennemars
9	Simon Kuipers	Jacques de Koning
10	Lars Elgersma	Jan Bos
11	Ronald Mulder	Stefan Groothuis
12	Jan Smeekens	Mark Tuitert
