= 2015 KNSB Dutch Single Distance Championships – Men's 1000 m =

- Venue: Thialf, Heerenveen
- Dates: 2 November 2014

Medalist men
1st place, gold medalist(s)		Kjeld Nuis	NED
2nd place, silver medalist(s)		Stefan Groothuis	NED
3rd place, bronze medalist(s)		Koen Verweij	NED

The men's 1000 meter at the 2015 KNSB Dutch Single Distance Championships took place in Heerenveen at the Thialf ice skating rink on Sunday 2 November 2014. There were 24 participants.

== Statistics ==
=== Result ===
Position	Skater	Heat	Lane	Time
1st place, gold medalist(s)	Kjeld Nuis	9	I	1:08.25 TR
2nd place, silver medalist(s)	Stefan Groothuis	9	O	1:08.56
3rd place, bronze medalist(s)	Koen Verweij	10	I	1:09.15
4	Hein Otterspeer	8	O	1:09.25
5	Kai Verbij	11	O	1:09.56
6	Pim Schipper	5	O	1:09.79
7	Gerben Jorritsma	8	I	1:09.84 PR
8	Michel Mulder	10	O	1:09.86
9	Thomas Krol	11	I	1:10.29
10	Sjoerd de Vries	12	O	1:10.45
11	Aron Romeijn	6	I	1:10.75(5)
11	Lucas van Alphen	6	O	1:10.75(5)
13	Thijs Roozen	2	I	1:10.76 PR
14	Paul-Yme Brunsmann	7	O	1:10.96 PR
15	Peter Groen	1	I	1:11.14 PR
16	Dai Dai Ntab	3	I	1:11.33 PR
17	Lieuwe Mulder	5	I	1:11.47
18	Joost Born	3	O	1:11.59 PR
19	Patrick Roest	1	O	1:11.69 PR
20	Alexander van Hasselt	4	I	1:11.80 PR
NC	Carlo Cesar	4	O	DNF
NC	Maurice Vriend	7	I	DNF
NC	Lennart Velema	12	I	DQ
NC	Karsten van Zeijl	2	O	DQ

Referee: Jan Bolt
Starter: Wim van Biezen
Start: 13:26 hr. Finish: 13:57 hr.

=== Draw ===
Heat	Inside lane	Outside lane
1	Peter Groen	Patrick Roest
2	Thijs Roozen	Karsten van Zeijl
3	Dai Dai Ntab	Joost Born
4	Alexander van Hasselt	Carlo Cesar
5	Lieuwe Mulder	Pim Schipper
6	Aron Romeijn	Lucas van Alphen
7	Maurice Vriend	Paul-Yme Brunsmann
8	Gerben Jorritsma	Hein Otterspeer
9	Kjeld Nuis	Stefan Groothuis
10	Koen Verweij	Michel Mulder
11	Thomas Krol	Kai Verbij
12	Lennart Velema	Sjoerd de Vries
