= Speed skating at the 2014 Winter Olympics – Men's 1000 metres =

Men's 1000 metres at the XXII Olympic Winter Games
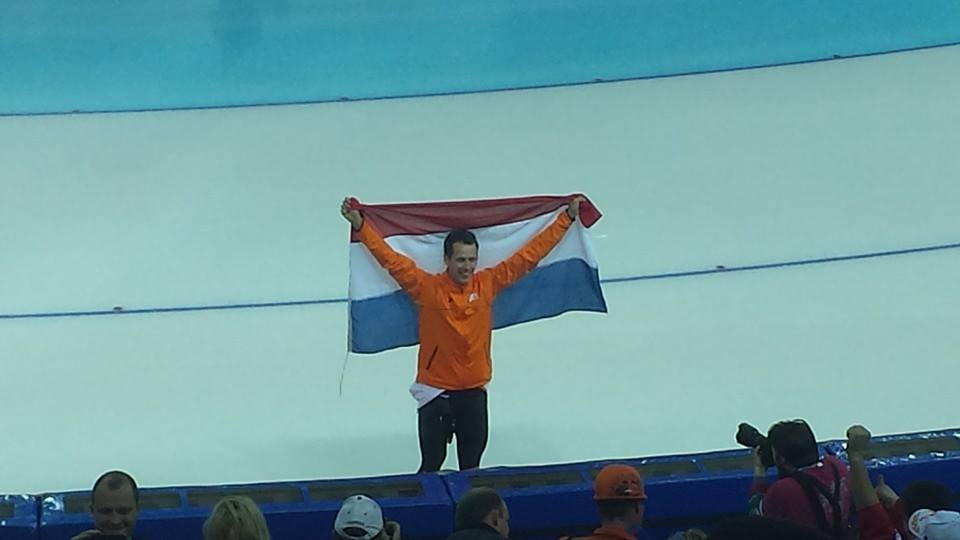
- Gold medal winner Stefan Groothuis
- Venue: Adler Arena Skating Center
- Date: 12 February 2014
- Competitors: 40 from 19 nations
- Winning time: 1:08.39

Medalists
1st place, gold medalist(s)		Stefan Groothuis	Netherlands
2nd place, silver medalist(s)		Denny Morrison	Canada
3rd place, bronze medalist(s)		Michel Mulder	Netherlands

The men's 1000 metres speed skating competition of the 2014 Sochi Olympics was held at Adler Arena Skating Center on 12 February 2014. Stefan Groothuis won the gold medal.

== Qualification ==
A total of forty speed skaters could qualify for this distance, with a maximum of four skaters per country. The top 20 of the men's 1000 metres World Cup standings after World Cup 4 in Berlin secured a spot for their country. Then the additional 20 spots were awarded based on a time ranking of all times skated in the World Cup and the 2014 World Sprint Speed Skating Championships. A reserve list was also made.

== Records ==
Prior to this competition, the existing world and Olympic records were as follows.

World record	Shani Davis (USA)	1:06.42	Salt Lake City, United States	7 March 2009
Olympic record	Gerard van Velde (NED)	1:07.18	Salt Lake City, United States	16 February 2002

At the 2013 World Single Distance Speed Skating Championships the track record was set by Denis Kuzin at 1:09.14.

The following records were set during this competition.

Date	Round	Athlete	Country	Time	Record
12 February	Pair 16	Stefan Groothuis	Netherlands	1:08.39	TR
12 February	Pair 14	Samuel Schwarz	Germany	1:08.89	TR

TR = track record

== Results ==
The race started at 18:00.

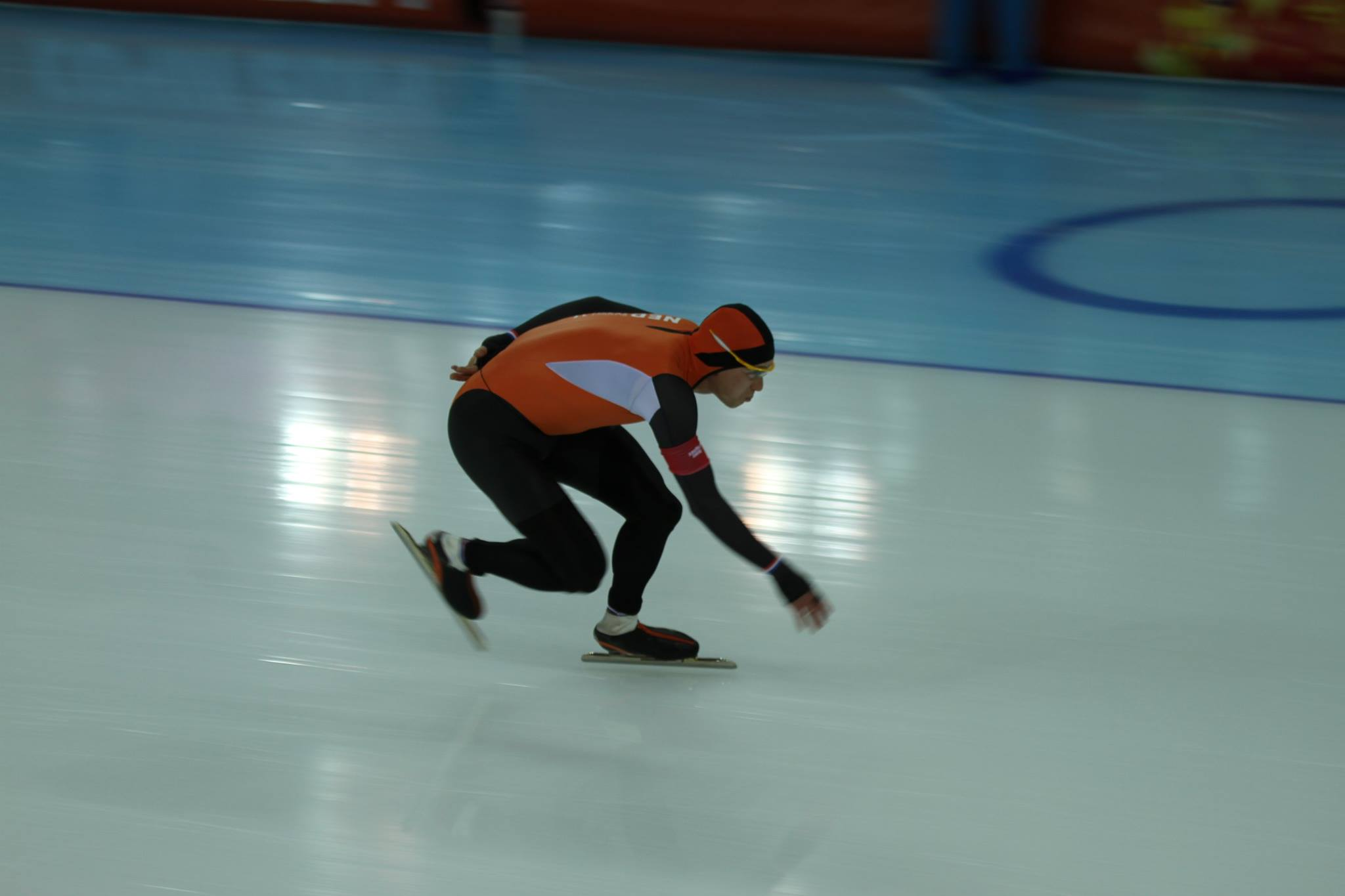
Stefan Groothuis

Rank	Pair	Lane	Name	Country	Time	Time behind	Notes
1st place, gold medalist(s)	16	O	Stefan Groothuis	Netherlands	1:08.39	—	TR
2nd place, silver medalist(s)	17	O	Denny Morrison	Canada	1:08.43	+0.04	
3rd place, bronze medalist(s)	17	I	Michel Mulder	Netherlands	1:08.74	+0.35	
4	16	I	Nico Ihle	Germany	1:08.86	+0.47	
5	14	O	Samuel Schwarz	Germany	1:08.89	+0.5	TR
6	18	I	Koen Verweij	Netherlands	1:09.09	+0.7	
7	20	I	Denis Kuzin	Kazakhstan	1:09.10	+0.71	
8	18	O	Shani Davis	United States	1:09.12	+0.73	
9	19	I	Brian Hansen	United States	1:09.21	+0.82	
10	4	I	Mark Tuitert	Netherlands	1:09.29	+0.9	
11	13	O	Håvard Holmefjord Lorentzen	Norway	1:09.33	+0.94	
12	19	O	Mo Tae-bum	South Korea	1:09.37	+0.98	
13	8	O	Roman Krech	Kazakhstan	1:09.63	+1.24	
14	10	O	Zbigniew Bródka	Poland	1:09.66	+1.27	
15	15	O	Joey Mantia	United States	1:09.72	+1.33	
16	13	I	Konrad Niedźwiedzki	Poland	1:09.76	+1.37	
17	3	I	Denis Yuskov	Russia	1:09.81	+1.42	
18	15	I	Aleksey Yesin	Russia	1:09.93	+1.54	
19	1	I	Håvard Bøkko	Norway	1:09.98	+1.59	
20	3	O	Vincent De Haître	Canada	1:10.04	+1.65	
21	6	O	Lee Kyou-hyuk	South Korea	1:10.04	+1.65	
22	12	I	Daniel Greig	Australia	1:10.13	+1.74	
23	7	I	Bart Swings	Belgium	1:10.14	+1.75	
24	9	I	Haralds Silovs	Latvia	1:10.29	+1.9	
25	20	O	Mirko Giacomo Nenzi	Italy	1:10.32	+1.93	
26	8	I	William Dutton	Canada	1:10.61	+2.22	
27	14	I	Dmitry Lobkov	Russia	1:10.65	+2.26	
28	7	O	Jonathan Garcia	United States	1:10.74	+2.35	
29	9	O	Benjamin Macé	France	1:10.80	+2.41	
30	11	O	Kim Tae-yun	South Korea	1:10.81	+2.42	
31	5	I	Espen Aarnes Hvammen	Norway	1:11.01	+2.62	
32	4	O	Muncef Ouardi	Canada	1:11.07	+2.68	
33	11	I	Fyodor Mezentsev	Kazakhstan	1:11.08	+2.69	
34	5	O	Tian Guojun	China	1:11.17	+2.78	
35	1	O	Taro Kondo	Japan	1:11.44	+3.05	
36	12	O	Daichi Yamanaka	Japan	1:11.93	+3.54	
37	2	O	Tommi Pulli	Finland	1:12.16	+3.77	
38	2	I	David Andersson	Sweden	1:12.40	+4.01	
39	6	I	Igor Bogolyubskiy	Russia	1:12.85	+4.46	
40	10	I	Sung Ching-yang	Chinese Taipei	1:13.79	+5.40	

TR = track record
