= 2015 KNSB Dutch Single Distance Championships – Women's 5000 m =

- Venue: Thialf, Heerenveen, Netherlands
- Date: 2 November 2014
- Competitors: 14 skaters

Medalist men
1st place, gold medalist(s)		Carien Kleibeuker	NED
2nd place, silver medalist(s)		Carlijn Achtereekte	NED
3rd place, bronze medalist(s)		Jorien Voorhuis	NED

The women's 5000 meter at the 2015 KNSB Dutch Single Distance Championships took place in Heerenveen at the Thialf ice skating rink on Sunday 2 November 2014. Although this tournament was held in 2014, it was part of the 2014–2015 speed skating season.

There were 14 participants.

Title holder was Yvonne Nauta.

== Result ==
Rank	Skater	Time
1st place, gold medalist(s)	Carien Kleibeuker	7:00.67
2nd place, silver medalist(s)	Carlijn Achtereekte	7:02.45 PR
3rd place, bronze medalist(s)	Jorien Voorhuis	7:03.54
4	Yvonne Nauta	7:03.60
5	Diane Valkenburg	7:04.14
6	Rixt Meijer	7:05.87 PR
7	Antoinette de Jong	7:05.95 PR
8	Lisa van der Geest	7:07.97
9	Irene Schouten	7:08.18 PR
10	Jade van der Molen	7:10.52 PR
11	Linda de Vries	7:10.86
12	Annouk van der Weijden	7:14.96
13	Marije Joling	7:19.39
14	Imke Vormeer	7:20.23
