= 2014 KNSB Dutch Single Distance Championships – Men's 1000 m =

Dutch speed skating competition

- Venue: Thialf, Heerenveen
- Dates: 27 October 2013
- Competitors: 24

Medalist men
1st place, gold medalist(s)		Kjeld Nuis	NED
2nd place, silver medalist(s)		Koen Verweij	NED
3rd place, bronze medalist(s)		Sjoerd de Vries	NED

The men's 1000 meter at the 2014 KNSB Dutch Single Distance Championships took place in Heerenveen at the Thialf ice skating rink on Sunday 27 October 2013. Although this tournament was held in 2013 it was part of the speed skating season 2013–2014. There were 24 participants.

== Statistics ==
=== Result ===
Position	Skater	Time
1st place, gold medalist(s)	Kjeld Nuis	1:08.84
2nd place, silver medalist(s)	Koen Verweij	1:09.20
3rd place, bronze medalist(s)	Sjoerd de Vries	1:09.32
4	Stefan Groothuis	1:09.41
5	Michel Mulder	1:09.58
6	Pim Schipper	1:09.64
7	Ronald Mulder	1:09.65
8	Hein Otterspeer	1:09.66
9	Thomas Krol	1:09.68
10	Lennart Velema	1:09.76
11	Mark Tuitert	1:09.79
12	Kai Verbij	1:10.37
13	Wouter olde Heuvel	1:10.49
14	Rhian Ket	1:10.55
15	Maurice Vriend	1:10.72
16	Jesper Hospes	1:10.87
17	Lieuwe Mulder	1:10.89 PR
18	Gerben Jorritsma	1:11.12
19	Aron Romeijn	1:11.17
20	Lucas van Alphen	1:11.18
21	Wesly Dijs	1:11.41
22	Tim Roelofsen	1:12.05
23	Martijn van Oosten	1:12.20
24	Gijs Esders	1:12.35

=== Draw ===
Heat	Inside lane	Outside lane
1	Martijn van Oosten	Gerben Jorritsma
2	Lieuwe Mulder	Lennart Velema
3	Tim Roelofsen	Wesly Dijs
4	Kai Verbij	Gijs Esders
5	Koen Verweij	Ronald Mulder
6	Wouter olde Heuvel	Aron Romeijn
7	Lucas van Alphen	Thomas Krol
8	Jesper Hospes	Maurice Vriend
9	Sjoerd de Vries	Hein Otterspeer
10	Kjeld Nuis	Pim Schipper
11	Mark Tuitert	Rhian Ket
12	Stefan Groothuis	Michel Mulder
