= 2015 KNSB Dutch Single Distance Championships – Men's 500 m =

Dutch speed skating competition

- Venue: Thialf, Heerenveen
- Dates: 31 October 2014
- Competitors: 24 skaters

Medalist men
1st place, gold medalist(s)		Jan Smeekens	NED
2nd place, silver medalist(s)		Michel Mulder	NED
3rd place, bronze medalist(s)		Pim Schipper	NED

The men's 500 meter at the 2015 KNSB Dutch Single Distance Championships took place in Heerenveen at the Thialf ice skating rink on Friday 31 October 2014. Although the tournament was held in 2014 it was part of the 2014–2015 speed skating season. There were 24 participants.

== Result ==
Position	Skater	1st. 500 meter	2nd. 500 meter	Time
1st place, gold medalist(s)	Jan Smeekens	35.028 (1)	34.856 (1)	69.884
2nd place, silver medalist(s)	Michel Mulder	35.156 (2)	35.231 (3)	70.387
3rd place, bronze medalist(s)	Pim Schipper	35.415 (5)	35.182 (2)	70.597 PR
4	Gerben Jorritsma	35.274 (4)	35.418 (4)	70.692
5	Hein Otterspeer	35.257 (3)	35.553 (7)	70.810
6	Dai Dai N'tab	35.561 (9)	35.432 (5)	70.993
7	Kai Verbij	35.564 (10)	35.434 (6)	70.998
8	Jesper Hospes	35.458 (7)	35.644 (10)	71.102
9	Lennart Velema	35.529 (8)	35.629 (8)	71.158
10	Stefan Groothuis	35.618 (11)	35.631 (9)	71.249
11	Kjeld Nuis	35.421 (6)	35.988 (12)	71.409
12	Thomas Krol	35.748 (12)	35.696 (11)	71.444
13	Paul-Yme Brunsmann	36.279 (13)	36.102 (13) PR	72.381 PR
14	Sjoerd de Vries	36.407 (14)	36.135 (14)	72.542
15	Oscar van Leen	36.452 (15)	36.345 (15)	72.797
16	Rudy Meereboer	36.618 (17)	36.584 (17)	73.202 PR
17	Lieuwe Mulder	36.562 (16)	36.718 (19)	73.280
18	Ruben Romeijn	36.926 (21)	36.661 (18)	73.587 PR
19	Alexander van Hasselt	36.727 (18)	36.860 (21)	73.587 PR
20	Carlo Cesar	36.869 (20)	36.813 (20)	73.682 PR
21	Aron Romeijn	1:06.491 (22)	36.474 (16)	102.965
NC	Martijn van Oosten	36.765 (19)	DQ	
NC	Joost Born	DNF		
NC	Arvin Wijsman	DNF		
