= 2015 KNSB Dutch Sprint Championships =

Sport season from dutch

KNSB Dutch Sprint Championships
- Venue: Sportcentrum Kardinge, Groningen
- Dates: 17 January – 18 January 2015
- Competitors: 24 men 24 women

Medalist men
1st place, gold medalist(s)		Hein Otterspeer	NED
2nd place, silver medalist(s)		Michel Mulder	NED
3rd place, bronze medalist(s)		Pim Schipper	NED

Medalist women
1st place, gold medalist(s)		Thijsje Oenema	NED
2nd place, silver medalist(s)		Laurine van Riessen	NED
3rd place, bronze medalist(s)		Margot Boer	NED

The 2015 KNSB Dutch Sprint Championships in speed skating were held in Groningen at the Sportcentrum Kardinge from 17 January to 18 January 2015. The tournament was part of the 2014–2015 speed skating season. Hein Otterspeer and Thijsje Oenema won the sprint titles.

== Schedule ==
Saturday 17 January 2015	Sunday 18 January 2015
500 meter women sprint 1st run 500 meter men sprint 1st run 1000 meter women sprint 1st run 1000 meter men sprint 1st run	500 meter women sprint 2nd run 500 meter men sprint 2nd run 1000 meter women sprint 2nd run 1000 meter men sprint 2nd run

== Medalist ==
Event	Gold		Silver		Bronze	
Women's Sprint overall	Thijsje Oenema	156.200	Laurine van Riessen	156.865	Margot Boer	156.895
Men's Sprint overall	Hein Otterspeer	141.380	Michel Mulder	141.885	Pim Schipper	142.385

=== Men's sprint ===
Event	1st place, gold medalist(s)	2nd place, silver medalist(s)	3rd place, bronze medalist(s)
Classification	Hein Otterspeer	Michel Mulder	Pim Schipper
500 meter (1st)	Hein Otterspeer	Michel Mulder	Jesper Hospes
1000 meter (1st)	Hein Otterspeer	Stefan Groothuis; Kjeld Nuis	
500 meter (2nd)	Michel Mulder	Jesper Hospes	Hein Otterspeer
1000 meter (2nd)	Hein Otterspeer	Kjeld Nuis	Koen Verweij

=== Women's sprint ===
Event	1st place, gold medalist(s)	2nd place, silver medalist(s)	3rd place, bronze medalist(s)
Classification	Thijsje Oenema	Laurine van Riessen	Margot Boer
500 meter (1st)	Thijsje Oenema	Floor van den Brandt	Margot Boer
1000 meter (1st)	Marrit Leenstra	Ireen Wüst	Thijsje Oenema
500 meter (2nd)	Thijsje Oenema	Margot Boer	Laurine van Riessen
1000 meter (2nd)	Marrit Leenstra	Laurine van Riessen	Margot Boer

== Classification ==
=== Men's sprint ===
Position	Skater	500m	1000m	500m	1000m	Total points Samalog
1st place, gold medalist(s)	Hein Otterspeer	35.53 (1)	1:10.24 (1)	35.66 (3)	1:10.14 (1)	141.380 TR
2nd place, silver medalist(s)	Michel Mulder	35.56 (2)	1:11.03 (7)	35.38 (1)	1:10.86 (6)	141.885
3rd place, bronze medalist(s)	Pim Schipper	35.85 (7)	1:10.76 (5)	35.84 (8)	1:10.63 (4)	142.385
4	Kjeld Nuis	36.00 (9)	1:10.48 (2)	35.99 (10)	1:10.58 (2)	142.520
5	Stefan Groothuis	36.12 (11)	1:10.48 (2)	36.22 (13)	1:10.97 (8)	143.065
6	Kai Verbij	35.90 (8)	1:11.59 (8)	36.03 (11)	1:11.18 (9)	143.315 PR
7	Gerben Jorritsma	36.25 (13)	1:11.84 (11)	35.82 (6)	1:10.69 (5)	143.335
8	Ronald Mulder	35.78 (5)	1:12.21 (13)	35.72 (5)	1:11.55 (10)	143.380
9	Thomas Krol	36.34 (14)	1:10.95 (6)	36.25 (14)	1:10.94 (7)	143.535
10	Koen Verweij	36.61 (16)	1:10.62 (4)	36.76 (20)	1:10.61 (3)	143.985
11	Lennart Velema	36.22 (12)	1:11.72 (9)	35.97 (9)	1:12.52 (16)	144.310
12	Aron Romeijn	36.00 (9)	1:12.39 (15)	36.19 (12)	1:12.45 (15)	144.610
13	Jesper Hospes	35.68 (3)	1:13.16 (17)	35.61 (2)	1:13.88 (22)	144.810
14	Sjoerd de Vries	36.50 (15)	1:11.96 (12)	36.66 (18)	1:11.57 (11)	144.925
15	Jan Smeekens	35.84 (6)	1:13.55 (21)	35.67 (4)	1:13.61 (21)	145.090
16	Lucas van Alphen	36.91 (21)	1:11.80 (10)	36.54 (15)	1:12.23 (12)	145.465
17	Paul-Yme Brunsmann	36.68 (18)	1:12.37 (14)	36.54 (15)	1:12.34 (13)	145.575 PR
18	Dai Dai N'tab	35.76 (4)	1:14.89 (24)	35.82 (6)	1:13.21 (17)	145.630
19	Martijn van Oosten	36.75 (19)	1:13.19 (18)	36.64 (17)	1:13.51 (20)	146.740
20	Lieuwe Mulder	36.86 (20)	1:13.33 (20)	36.74 (19)	1:13.45 (19)	146.990
21	Maurice Vriend	37.30 (23)	1:12.93 (16)	37.14 (22)	1:12.44 (14)	147.125
22	Arvin Wijsman	37.32 (24)	1:13.31 (19)	36.94 (21)	1:13.31 (18)	147.570
23	Oscar van Leen	36.65 (17)	1:14.62 (23)	37.16 (23)	1:14.93 (24)	148.585
24	Alexander van Hasselt	37.14 (22)	1:14.30 (22)	37.21 (24)	1:14.40 (23)	148.700

=== Women's sprint ===
Position	Skater	500m	1000m	500m	1000m	Total points Samalog
1st place, gold medalist(s)	Thijsje Oenema	38.78 (1) TR	1:18.40 (3)	38.78 (1) TR	1:18.88 (6)	156.200 TR
2nd place, silver medalist(s)	Laurine van Riessen	39.43 (5)	1:18.51 (4)	39.14 (3)	1:18.08 (2)	156.865
3rd place, bronze medalist(s)	Margot Boer	39.15 (3)	1:18.68 (5)	39.10 (2)	1:18.61 (3)	156.895
4	Marrit Leenstra	39.59 (8)	1:17.81 (1)	39.70 (10)	1:17.72 (1)	157.055
5	Floor van den Brandt	39.12 (2)	1:19.92 (14)	39.26 (4)	1:19.71 (12)	158.195
6	Janine Smit	39.40 (4)	1:19.52 (10)	39.40 (5)	1:19.61 (11)	158.365
7	Annette Gerritsen	39.58 (7)	1:19.83 (12)	39.52 (7)	1:19.53 (10)	158.780
8	Bo van der Werff	40.26 (12)	1:19.04 (7)	39.42 (6)	1:19.32 (9)	158.860
9	Letitia de Jong	39.91 (10)	1:19.27 (9)	39.85 (11)	1:18.99 (7)	158.890
10	Anice Das	39.46 (6)	1:19.84 (13)	39.57 (8)	1:20.95 (15)	159.425
11	Manon Kamminga	40.20 (11)	1:19.03 (6)	40.25 (12)	1:19.09 (8)	159.510 PR
12	Annouk van der Weijden	40.45 (18)	1:19.14 (8)	40.45 (16)	1:18.70 (4)	159.820 PR
13	Roxanne van Hemert	40.34 (14)	1:19.55 (11)	40.50 (17)	1:18.86 (5)	160.045
14	Lotte van Beek	40.49 (19)	1:20.23 (16)	40.40 (15)	1:19.90 (13)	160.955
15	Mayon Kuipers	39.87 (9)	1:22.71 (22)	39.69 (9)	1:23.04 (21)	162.435
16	Irene Schouten	41.01 (21)	1:19.92 (14)	41.70 (23)	1:20.51 (14)	162.925
17	Bente van den Berge	40.44 (17)	1:22.58 (21)	40.30 (14)	1:22.83 (20)	163.445
18	Sanne van der Schaar	40.93 (20)	1:21.84 (19)	41.13 (20)	1:21.05 (16)	163.505
19	Leeyen Harteveld	41.45 (23)	1:21.73 (18)	41.06 (19)	1:22.35 (19)	164.550
20	Manouk van Tol	41.94 (24)	1:20.99 (17)	41.66 (22)	1:21.91 (17)	165.050
21	Rosa Pater	40.41 (15)	2:27.87 (24)	40.83 (18)	1:22.13 (18)	196.240
NC	Moniek Klijnstra	40.42 (16)	1:22.32 (20)	40.27 (13)	DNS	DNS
NC	Emma van Rijn	41.35 (22)	1:24.04 (23)	41.28 (21)	DNS	DNC
NC	Ireen Wüst	40.30 (13)	1:17.99 (2)	DNS	DNS	DNS
