= 2023 KNSB Dutch Sprint Championships =

Dutch speed skating competition

KNSB Dutch Sprint Championships
- Venue: Thialf ice skating rink, Heerenveen
- Dates: 27–28 December 2022
- Competitors: 20 men 20 women

Medalist men
1st place, gold medalist(s)		Hein Otterspeer	NED
2nd place, silver medalist(s)		Merijn Scheperkamp	NED
3rd place, bronze medalist(s)		Kai Verbij	NED

Medalist women
1st place, gold medalist(s)		Jutta Leerdam	NED
2nd place, silver medalist(s)		Femke Kok	NED
3rd place, bronze medalist(s)		Marrit Fledderus	NED

The 2023 KNSB Dutch Sprint Championships in speed skating were held in Heerenveen at the Thialf ice skating rink from 27 December to 28 December 2022. The tournament was part of the 2022–2023 speed skating season. Hein Otterspeer and Jutta Leerdam won the sprint titles. The sprint championships were held on the same day as the 2023 KNSB Dutch Allround Championships.

== Schedule ==
Tuesday 27 December 2022	Wednesday 28 December 2022
500 meter women sprint 1st run 500-meter men sprint 1st run 1000 meter women sprint 1st run 1000 meter men sprint 1st run	500-meter women sprint 2nd run 500-meter men sprint 2nd run 1000 meter women sprint 2nd run 1000 meter men sprint 2nd run

== Medalists ==
Event	Gold		Silver		Bronze	
Women's Sprint overall	Jutta Leerdam	147.135	Femke Kok	148.610	Marrit Fledderus	150.225
Men's Sprint overall	Hein Otterspeer	137.400	Merijn Scheperkamp	137.700	Kai Verbij	137.935

== Men's sprint classification ==
Rank	Athlete	Team	500m	1000m	500m	1000m	Total points Samalog
1st place, gold medalist(s)	Hein Otterspeer	Team Reggeborgh	34.89 (4)	1:07.53 (1)	34.89 (4)	1:07.71 (3)	137.400
2nd place, silver medalist(s)	Merijn Scheperkamp	Team Jumbo-Visma	34.81 (3)	1:08.44 (6)	34.69 (1)	1:07.96 (5)	137.700
3rd place, bronze medalist(s)	Kai Verbij	Team Jumbo-Visma	34.79 (2)	1:08.41 (5)	34.90 (5)	1:08.08 (7)	137.935
4	Janno Botman	Team Reggeborgh	34.79 (1)	1:08.90 (7)	34.69 (2)	1:08.06 (6)	137.960
5	Kjeld Nuis	Team Reggeborgh	35.20 (9)	1:08.23 (3)	35.05 (7)	1:07.39 (1)	138.060
6	Thomas Krol	Team Jumbo-Visma	35.21 (10)	1:07.88 (2)	35.39 (10)	1:07.64 (2)	138.360
7	Wesly Dijs	Team Reggeborgh	35.64 (17)	1:08.24 (4)	35.74 (17)	1:07.86 (4)	139.430
8	Stefan Westenbroek	Team Reggeborgh	35.07 (5)	1:09.38 (11)	34.97 (6)	1:09.43 (11)	139.445
9	Tijmen Snel	Team Jumbo-Visma	35.14 (8)	1:09.29 (9)	35.62 (16)	1:08.61 (9)	139.710
10	Kayo Vos	Team IKO	35.25 (11)	1:09.27 (8)	35.44 (11)	1:09.24 (10)	139.945
11	Joep Wennemars	Team Jumbo-Visma	35.82 (20)	1:09.30 (10)	35.25 (8)	1:08.49 (8)	139.965
12	Sebas Diniz	Team IKO	35.10 (6)	1:10.27 (17)	34.84 (3)	1:10.34 (15)	140.245
13	Louis Hollaar	Team Reggeborgh	35.62 (15)	1:09.62 (15)	35.48 (12)	1:09.43 (12)	140.625
14	Gijs Esders	Team IKO	35.41 (14)	1:09.39 (12)	35.60 (14)	1:09.90 (13)	140.655
15	Armand Broos	Team IKO	35.33 (13)	1:10.53 (18)	35.38 (9)	1:09.94 (14)	140.945
16	Mats Siemons	Team Reggeborgh	35.62 (16)	1:09.45 (13)	35.51 (13)	1:10.37 (16)	141.040
17	Joost van Dobbenburgh	Gewest Friesland	35.75 (18)	1:10.24 (16)	35.90 (18)	1:10.64 (17)	142.090
18	Dai Dai N'tab	Team Jumbo-Visma	35.12 (7)	1:09.51 (14)	DQ		69.875
19	Rem de Hair	Gewest Friesland	35.76 (19)	1:11.85 (19)			71.685
20	Serge Yoro	Team Jumbo-Visma	35.31 (12)	DNF			35.310

- DNF = Did not finish

== Women's sprint classification ==
Rank	Athlete	Team	500m	1000m	500m	1000m	Total points Samalog
1st place, gold medalist(s)	Jutta Leerdam	Team Jumbo-Visma	37.14 (2)	1:12.83 (1)	37.18 (1)	1:12.80 (1)	147.135
2nd place, silver medalist(s)	Femke Kok	Team Reggeborgh	37.07 (1)	1:14.13 (2)	37.32 (2)	1:14.31 (2)	148.610
3rd place, bronze medalist(s)	Marrit Fledderus	Team Reggeborgh	37.78 (3)	1:15.11 (3)	37.61 (3)	1:14.56 (3)	150.225
4	Isabel Grevelt	Gewest Friesland	38.09 (5)	1:15.30 (4)	37.96 (5)	1:15.11 (4)	151.255
5	Michelle de Jong	Team Reggeborgh	37.91 (4)	1:16.40 (5)	37.74 (4)	1:15.95 (7)	151.825
6	Naomi Verkerk	Team Novus	38.13 (6)	1:16.48 (6)	38.08 (6)	1:15.48 (6)	152.190
7	Helga Drost	Gewest Friesland	38.52 (8)	1:17.39 (9)	38.23 (8)	1:15.45 (5)	153.170
8	Sanneke de Neeling	Gewest Friesland	38.74 (11)	1:16.52 (7)	38.66 (10)	1:15.97 (8)	153.645
9	Esmé Stollenga	Gewest Friesland	38.64 (10)	1:17.66 (10)	38.17 (7)	1:16.50 (9)	153.890
10	Marit van Beijnum	Gewest Friesland	38.56 (9)	1:17.69 (11)	38.40 (9)	1:17.27 (11)	154.440
11	Maud Lugters	Gewest Friesland	38.83 (12)	1:17.26 (8)	38.69 (11)	1:17.20 (10)	154.750
12	Anna Boersma	Team FrySk	38.99 (14)	1:17.99 (13)	38.89 (12)	1:17.50 (12)	155.625
13	Sylke Kas	KNSB Talent Team Noordwest	39.21 (15)	1:18.49 (14)	38.94 (13)	1:18.15 (14)	156.470
14	Ramona Westerhuis	Gewest Friesland	38.94 (13)	1:18.77 (16)	38.95 (14)	1:18.79 (15)	156.670
15	Chloé Hoogendoorn	TalentNED	39.54 (18)	1:18.70 (15)	39.26 (16)	1:17.82 (13)	157.060
16	Pien Smit	TalentNED	39.29 (16)	1:19.31 (18)	39.39 (17)	1:19.07 (16)	157.870
17	Sacha van der Weide	Gewest Friesland	39.35 (17)	1:21.38 (19)	39.19 (15)	1:19.86 (17)	159.160
18	Amber Duizendstraal	Team FrySk	39.77 (19)	1:19.24 (17)	39.45 (18)	1:20.99 (19)	159.335
19	Anne Plat		40.58 (20)	1:21.67 (20)	40.31 (19)	1:20.84 (18)	162.145
20	Dione Voskamp	Team Novus	38.32 (7)	1:17.81 (12)			77.225
