= 2015 World Sprint Speed Skating Championships – Men =

Men at the 2015 World Sprint Speed Skating Championships
- Date: 28 February – 1 March 2015
- Competitors: 32 from 13 nations
- Winning time: 138.325

Medalists
gold medal	Pavel Kulizhnikov	Russia
silver medal	Hein Otterspeer	Netherlands
bronze medal	Aleksey Yesin	Russia

The men event of the 2015 World Sprint Speed Skating Championships was held on 28 February – 1 March 2015.

== Results ==
=== 500 m ===
The race was started at 18:19.

Rank	Pair	Lane	Name	Country	Time	Diff
1	15	i	Pavel Kulizhnikov	RUS	34.56	
2	15	o	Michel Mulder	NED	34.84	+0.28
3	16	o	Laurent Dubreuil	CAN	34.89	+0.33
4	11	o	Roman Krech	KAZ	34.92	+0.36
5	9	o	Ruslan Murashov	RUS	34.95	+0.39
6	11	i	Aleksey Yesin	RUS	35.04	+0.48
7	10	i	Mika Poutala	FIN	35.05	+0.49
7	12	o	Espen Aarnes Hvammen	NOR	35.05	+0.49
7	9	i	Nico Ihle	GER	35.05	+0.49
10	16	i	Hein Otterspeer	NED	35.08	+0.52
11	14	o	Gilmore Junio	CAN	35.22	+0.66
12	3	o	Pekka Koskela	FIN	35.31	+0.75
13	14	i	Mitchell Whitmore	USA	35.32	+0.76
14	8	i	Pim Schipper	NED	35.35	+0.80
15	5	i	Mirko Giacomo Nenzi	ITA	35.38	+0.82
16	8	o	Jonathan Garcia	USA	35.41	+0.85
17	13	i	Jamie Gregg	CAN	35.42	+0.86
18	10	o	Kim Jun-ho	KOR	35.44	+0.88
19	5	o	Mu Zhongsheng	CHN	35.46	+0.90
20	6	i	Artur Nogal	POL	35.47	+0.91
20	7	o	Samuel Schwarz	GER	35.47	+0.91
22	7	i	Xie Jiaxuan	CHN	35.48	+0.92
23	4	i	Piotr Michalski	POL	35.62	+1.06
23	6	o	Shani Davis	USA	35.62	+1.06
25	2	i	David Bosa	ITA	35.67	+1.11
26	12	i	Ryohei Haga	JPN	35.68	+1.12
27	4	o	Denis Kuzin	KAZ	35.74	+1.19
28	1	o	Håvard Holmefjord Lorentzen	NOR	35.92	+1.36
29	3	i	Shunsuke Nakamura	JPN	35.93	+1.37
30	13	o	Mo Tae-bum	KOR	36.31	+1.75
31	2	o	Aleksandr Zhigin	KAZ	36.54	+1.98
32	1	i	Yang Fan	CHN	36.55	+1.99

=== 1000 m ===
The race was started at 20:07.

Rank	Pair	Lane	Name	Country	Time	Diff
1	13	o	Hein Otterspeer	NED	1:08.93	
2	13	i	Nico Ihle	GER	1:09.10	+0.17
3	16	i	Pavel Kulizhnikov	RUS	1:09.11	+0.18
4	15	i	Shani Davis	USA	1:09.12	+0.19
5	10	i	Aleksey Yesin	RUS	1:09.46	+0.53
6	12	i	Pim Schipper	NED	1:09.67	+0.74
6	11	i	Samuel Schwarz	GER	1:09.67	+0.74
8	12	o	Denis Kuzin	KAZ	1:09.73	+0.80
9	9	i	Jonathan Garcia	USA	1:09.83	+0.90
10	11	o	Michel Mulder	NED	1:10.02	+1.09
11	1	o	Ruslan Murashov	RUS	1:10.03	+1.10
12	10	o	Håvard Holmefjord Lorentzen	NOR	1:10.21	+1.28
13	14	i	Laurent Dubreuil	CAN	1:10.28	+1.35
14	7	o	Mirko Giacomo Nenzi	ITA	1:10.34	+1.41
15	2	o	Espen Aarnes Hvammen	NOR	1:10.39	+1.46
16	3	o	Mika Poutala	FIN	1:10.61	+1.68
17	14	o	Mitchell Whitmore	USA	1:10.83	+1.90
18	5	i	Piotr Michalski	POL	1:10.87	+1.94
19	8	i	Kim Jun-ho	KOR	1:11.07	+2.14
20	4	o	Artur Nogal	POL	1:11.27	+2.34
21	3	i	Roman Krech	KAZ	1:11.28	+2.35
22	7	i	Pekka Koskela	FIN	1:11.32	+2.39
23	6	o	Yang Fan	CHN	1:11.41	+2.48
24	8	o	Shunsuke Nakamura	JPN	1:11.49	+2.56
25	4	i	David Bosa	ITA	1:11.63	+2.70
26	9	o	Mo Tae-bum	KOR	1:11.67	+2.74
27	15	o	Gilmore Junio	CAN	1:11.74	+2.81
27	6	i	Aleksandr Zhigin	KAZ	1:11.74	+2.81
29	16	o	Jamie Gregg	CAN	1:11.75	+2.82
30	5	o	Mu Zhongsheng	CHN	1:11.79	+2.86
31	1	i	Xie Jiaxuan	CHN	1:12.32	+3.39
32	2	i	Ryohei Haga	JPN	1:15.03	+6.10

=== 500 m ===
The race was started at 19:13.

Rank	Pair	Lane	Name	Country	Time	Diff
1	16	o	Pavel Kulizhnikov	RUS	34.68	
2	11	o	Mika Poutala	FIN	35.03	+0.35
2	15	o	Hein Otterspeer	NED	35.03	+0.35
4	15	i	Ruslan Murashov	RUS	35.06	+0.38
5	16	i	Michel Mulder	NED	35.11	+0.43
6	9	i	Roman Krech	KAZ	35.13	+0.45
6	12	i	Espen Aarnes Hvammen	NOR	35.13	+0.45
8	9	o	Mitchell Whitmore	USA	35.24	+0.56
9	7	o	Artur Nogal	POL	35.27	+0.59
10	10	o	Mirko Giacomo Nenzi	ITA	35.34	+0.66
11	6	i	Håvard Holmefjord Lorentzen	NOR	35.37	+0.69
12	13	o	Aleksey Yesin	RUS	35.38	+0.70
12	7	i	Kim Jun-ho	KOR	35.38	+0.70
14	12	o	Pim Schipper	NED	35.40	+0.72
15	6	o	Jamie Gregg	CAN	35.41	+0.73
16	5	i	Gilmore Junio	CAN	35.42	+0.74
16	14	i	Laurent Dubreuil	CAN	35.42	+0.74
18	8	o	Piotr Michalski	POL	35.48	+0.80
19	8	i	Denis Kuzin	KAZ	35.58	+0.90
20	11	i	Samuel Schwarz	GER	35.62	+0.94
21	4	o	Xie Jiaxuan	CHN	35.65	+0.97
22	5	o	David Bosa	ITA	35.67	+0.99
23	10	i	Jonathan Garcia	USA	35.69	+1.01
24	1	o	Ryohei Haga	JPN	35.82	+1.14
25	3	i	Mo Tae-bum	KOR	36.04	+1.36
26	3	o	Shunsuke Nakamura	JPN	36.11	+1.43
27	4	i	Mu Zhongsheng	CHN	36.19	+1.51
28	13	i	Shani Davis	USA	37.05	+2.37
	2	i	Aleksandr Zhigin	KAZ	DNF	
	2	o	Yang Fan	CHN	DSQ	
	14	o	Nico Ihle	GER	DSQ	

=== 1000 m ===
The race was started at 20:56.

Rank	Pair	Lane	Name	Country	Time	Diff
1	12	o	Pavel Kulizhnikov	RUS	1:09.06	
2	11	o	Aleksey Yesin	RUS	1:09.41	+0.35
3	3	i	Håvard Holmefjord Lorentzen	NOR	1:09.43	+0.37
4	12	i	Hein Otterspeer	NED	1:09.52	+0.46
5	9	o	Pim Schipper	NED	1:09.73	+0.67
6	5	i	Denis Kuzin	KAZ	1:09.75	+0.69
6	9	i	Espen Aarnes Hvammen	NOR	1:09.75	+0.69
8	11	i	Michel Mulder	NED	1:09.81	+0.75
9	6	o	Jonathan Garcia	USA	1:09.82	+0.76
10	7	o	Samuel Schwarz	GER	1:09.87	+0.81
11	10	o	Laurent Dubreuil	CAN	1:10.28	+1.22
12	8	i	Mika Poutala	FIN	1:10.32	+1.26
13	7	i	Mirko Giacomo Nenzi	ITA	1:10.37	+1.31
14	6	i	Mitchell Whitmore	USA	1:10.73	+1.67
15	4	o	Piotr Michalski	POL	1:10.80	+1.74
16	4	i	Artur Nogal	POL	1:10.86	+1.80
17	5	o	Kim Jun-ho	KOR	1:10.98	+1.92
18	2	i	Gilmore Junio	CAN	1:11.00	+1.94
19	8	o	Roman Krech	KAZ	1:11.22	+2.16
20	2	o	Xie Jiaxuan	CHN	1:11.56	+2.50
21	1	i	Jamie Gregg	CAN	1:11.64	+2.58
22	3	o	David Bosa	ITA	1:11.81	+2.75
	10	i	Ruslan Murashov	RUS	DSQ	

=== Overall standings ===
After all events.

Rank	Name	Country	Points	Diff
1st place, gold medalist(s)	Pavel Kulizhnikov	RUS	138.325	
2nd place, silver medalist(s)	Hein Otterspeer	NED	139.335	+1.01
3rd place, bronze medalist(s)	Aleksey Yesin	RUS	139.855	+1.53
4	Michel Mulder	NED	139.865	+1.54
5	Espen Aarnes Hvammen	NOR	140.250	+1.93
6	Pim Schipper	NED	140.460	+2.14
7	Mika Poutala	FIN	140.545	+2.22
8	Laurent Dubreuil	CAN	140.590	+2.27
9	Samuel Schwarz	GER	140.860	+2.54
10	Jonathan Garcia	USA	140.925	+2.60
11	Denis Kuzin	KAZ	141.070	+2.75
12	Mirko Giacomo Nenzi	ITA	141.075	+2.75
13	Håvard Holmefjord Lorentzen	NOR	141.110	+2.79
14	Roman Krech	KAZ	141.300	+2.98
15	Mitchell Whitmore	USA	141.340	+3.02
16	Artur Nogal	POL	141.805	+3.48
17	Kim Jun-ho	KOR	141.845	+3.52
18	Piotr Michalski	POL	141.935	+3.61
19	Gilmore Junio	CAN	142.010	+3.69
20	Jamie Gregg	CAN	142.525	+4.20
21	David Bosa	ITA	143.060	+4.74
22	Xie Jiaxuan	CHN	143.070	+4.75
	Shani Davis	USA	—	
	Mu Zhongsheng	CHN	—	
	Shunsuke Nakamura	JPN	—	
	Mo Tae-bum	KOR	—	
	Ruslan Murashov	RUS	—	
	Ryohei Haga	JPN	—	
	Nico Ihle	GER	—	
	Yang Fan	CHN	—	
	Aleksandr Zhigin	KAZ	—	
	Pekka Koskela	FIN	—	
