= 2017 KNSB Dutch Single Distance Championships – Men's 5000 m =

Dutch speed skating competition

- Venue: Thialf, Heerenveen
- Dates: 28 December 2016
- Competitors: 18 skaters

Medalist men
1st place, gold medalist(s)		Sven Kramer	NED
2nd place, silver medalist(s)		Jorrit Bergsma	NED
3rd place, bronze medalist(s)		Douwe de Vries	NED

The men's 5000 meter at the 2017 KNSB Dutch Single Distance Championships took place in Heerenveen at the Thialf ice skating rink on Wednesday 28 December 2016. There were 18 participants.

== Statistics ==
=== Result ===
Position	Skater	Heat	Lane	Time
1st place, gold medalist(s)	Sven Kramer	7	O	6:14.17
2nd place, silver medalist(s)	Jorrit Bergsma	9	I	6:18.08
3rd place, bronze medalist(s)	Douwe de Vries	8	O	6:18.51
4	Jan Blokhuijsen	8	I	6:19.54
5	Bob de Vries	2	O	6:23.85
6	Marcel Bosker	4	I	6:25.93 PR
7	Erik Jan Kooiman	5	I	6:26.89
8	Jos de Vos	4	O	6:27.34
9	Arjan Stroetinga	1	I	6:27.54
10	Mats Stoltenborg	7	I	6:28.49
11	Bart de Vries	1	O	6:29.68 PR
12	Patrick Roest	9	O	6:29.71
13	Bart Mol	6	I	6:29.94
14	Marwin Talsma	6	O	6:30.76
15	Evert Hoolwerf	3	I	6:31.20
16	Remco Schouten	5	O	6:33.91
17	Simon Schouten	2	I	6:37.87
18	Kars Jansman	3	O	6:39.44

Referee: Dina Melis
Starter: Raymond Micka
Start: 16:35 hr. Finish: 17:59 hr.

=== Draw ===
Heat	Inside lane	Outside lane
1	Arjan Stroetinga	Bart de Vries
2	Simon Schouten	Bob de Vries
3	Evert Hoolwerf	Kars Jansman
4	Marcel Bosker	Jos de Vos
5	Erik Jan Kooiman	Remco Schouten
6	Bart Mol	Marwin Talsma
7	Mats Stoltenborg	Sven Kramer
8	Jan Blokhuijsen	Douwe de Vries
9	Jorrit Bergsma	Patrick Roest
