= 2017 KNSB Dutch Single Distance Championships – Men's 10,000 m =

Dutch speed skating competition

2017 KNSB Dutch Single Distance Championships – Men's 10000 m
- Venue: Thialf, Heerenveen
- Dates: 30 December 2016
- Competitors: 12 skaters

Medalist men
1st place, gold medalist(s)		Jorrit Bergsma	NED
2nd place, silver medalist(s)		Sven Kramer	NED
3rd place, bronze medalist(s)		Bob de Vries	NED

The men's 10,000 meter at the 2017 KNSB Dutch Single Distance Championships took place in Heerenveen at the Thialf ice skating rink on Friday 30 December 2016. There were 12 participants.

== Statistics ==
=== Result ===
Position	Skater	Time
1st place, gold medalist(s)	Jorrit Bergsma	12:52.34
2nd place, silver medalist(s)	Sven Kramer	12:53.59
3rd place, bronze medalist(s)	Bob de Vries	13:01.93
4	Mats Stoltenborg	13:06.38 PR
5	Erik Jan Kooiman	13.08.92
6	Jan Blokhuijsen	13:15.73
7	Bart Mol	13:16.56 PR
8	Jos de Vos	13:23.35 PR
9	Patrick Roest	13:26.63 PR
10	Bart de Vries	13:27.36 PR
11	Jouke Hoogeveen	13:28.61
12	Marcel Bosker	13:37.44 PR

Source: Referee: Dina Melis. Assistant: Loretta Staring
Starter: Raymond Micka
Start: 16:12 hr. Finish: 17:56 hr.

=== Draw ===
Heat	Inside lane	Outside lane
1	Bart de Vries	Patrick Roest
2	Marcel Bosker	Jan Blokhuijsen
3	Bart Mol	Mats Stoltenborg
4	Sven Kramer	Jos de Vos
5	Jorrit Bergsma	Erik Jan Kooiman
6	Jouke Hoogeveen	Bob de Vries
