= Gerben Jorritsma =

Dutch former speed skater (born 1993)

Personal information
- Born: 21 August 1993 (age 32) Diever, Netherlands

Sport
- Country: Netherlands
- Sport: Speed skating
- Turned pro: 2013
- Retired: 2020

Gerben Jorritsma (born 21 August 1993) is a Dutch former speed skater who specialized in the sprint distances.

== Career ==
He won the 1,500 meters 2015–16 ISU Speed Skating World Cup event in Calgary on 15 November 2015 in a personal record of 1:07,20, ahead of Russia's Pavel Kulizhnikov. Jorritsma was a member of the Team LottoNL-Jumbo and later TalentNED. In the 2020–21 season he didn't have a sponsor and he had to quit with speed skating. His cousin Jorjan Jorritsma was also a speed skater.

== Personal records ==
Personal records
Men's speed skating
| Event | Result | Date | Location | Notes |
| 500 m | 34.53 | 22 November 2015 | Utah Olympic Oval, Salt Lake City | |
| 1000 m | 1:07.20 | 14 November 2015 | Olympic Oval, Calgary | |
| 1500 m | 1:44.43 | 20 November 2015 | Utah Olympic Oval, Salt Lake City | |
| 3000 m | 3:51.01 | 18 January 2014 | Eisstadion Inzell, Inzell | |
| 5000 m | 6:47.28 | 11 March 2012 | Kunstijsbaan Breda, Breda | |

== Tournament overview ==
| Season | Dutch Championships Single Distances | Dutch Championships Sprint | World Championships Junior | World Cup GWC |
|---|---|---|---|---|
| 2012–13 | | GRONINGEN 18th 500m 20th 1000m 19th 500m 18th 1000m 19th overall | COLLALBO (silver) 500m 6th 3000m 8th 1500m 7th 5000m 5th overall 7th 5000m 6th team pursuit | |
| 2013–14 | HEERENVEEN 11th 500m 18th 1000m 22nd 1500m | AMSTERDAM 14th 500m DNS 1000m DNS 500m DNS 1000m NC overall | | |
| 2014–15 | HEERENVEEN 4th 500m 7th 1000m 17th 1500m | GRONINGEN 13th 500m 11th 1000m 7th 500m 5th 1000m 7th overall | | 15th 500m 26th mass start |
| 2015–16 | HEERENVEEN DNF 500m | HEERENVEEN 6th 500m (silver) 1000m 9th 500m (silver) ) 1000m (bronze) overall | | 23rd 500m (bronze) 1000m 12th 1500m |
| 2016–17 | HEERENVEEN 11th 500m 11th 1000m | HEERENVEEN 11th 500m 9th 1000m 8th 500m 11th 1000m 10th overall | | |
| 2017–18 | HEERENVEEN 10th 500m 15th 1000m 18th 1500m | | | |
| 2018–19 | HEERENVEEN 12th 500m | HEERENVEEN 8th 500m 6th 1000m DQ 500m DNS 1000m NC overall | | |
| 2019–20 | HEERENVEEN 16th 500m 14th 1000m | HEERENVEEN 7th 500m DNS 1000m DNS 500m DNS 1000m NC overall | | |

DNS = Did not start
DNF = Did not finish
NC = No classification
