= Eppie Bleeker =

Dutch speed skater (born 1949)

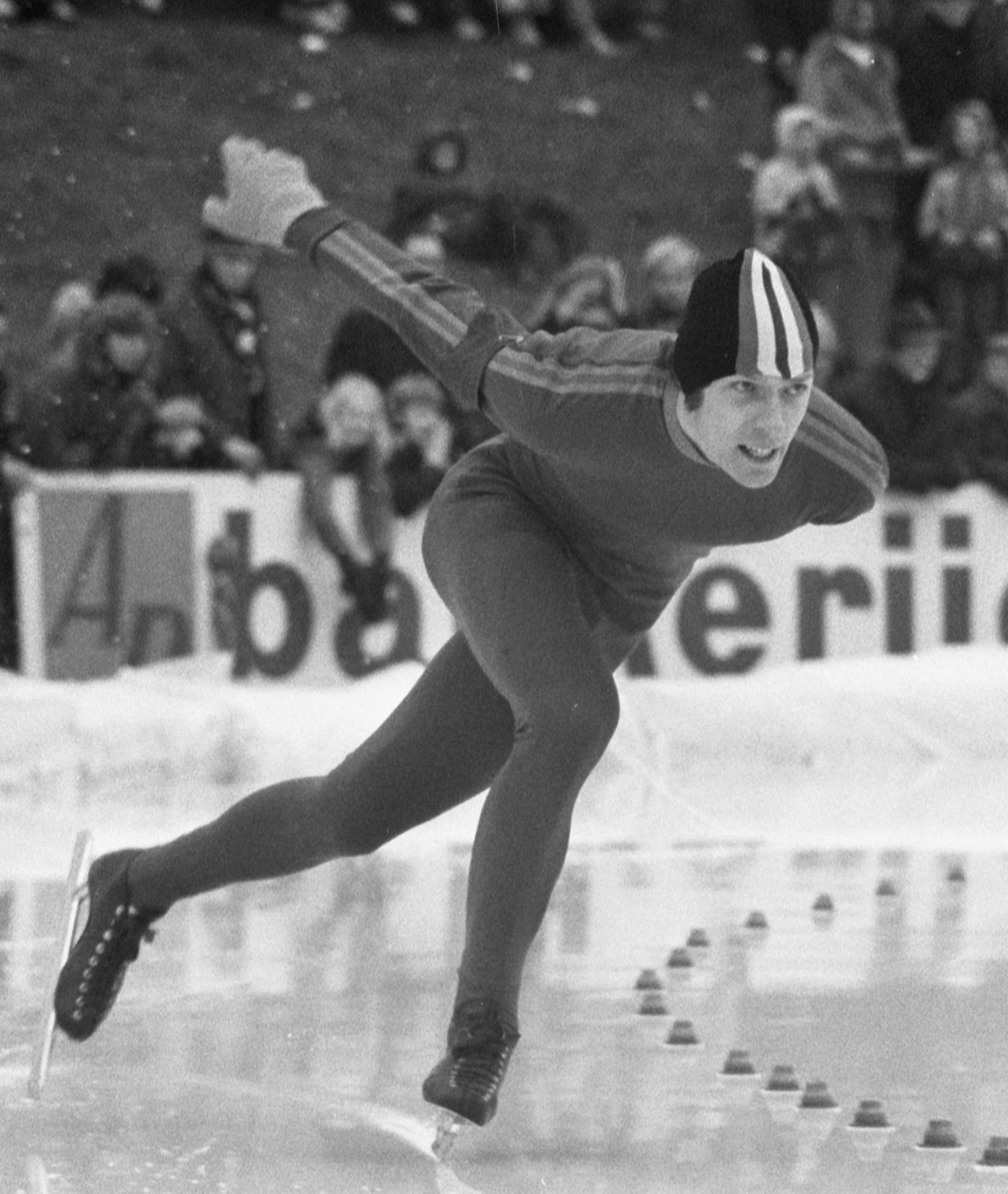
- Bleeker in 1974

Personal information
- Born: 5 May 1949 (age 77) Bolsward, Netherlands

Sport
- Country: Netherlands
- Sport: Speed skating
Medal record
World Sprint Championships
Bronze medal – third place	1973 Oslo	Sprint
Bronze medal – third place	1974 Innsbruk	Sprint

Eppie Bleeker (born 5 May 1949) is a retired Dutch speedskater who won bronze medals at the World Sprint Championships in 1973 and 1974. He also won the national sprint titles in 1974 and 1975.

Personal bests:

- 500 m – 38.70 (1977)
- 1000 m – 1:19.34 (1974)
- 1500 m – 2:04.59 (1974)
- 3000 m – 4:34.30 (1975)
- 5000 m – 8:01.90 (1974)
