= Jan Bazen =

Dutch speed skater

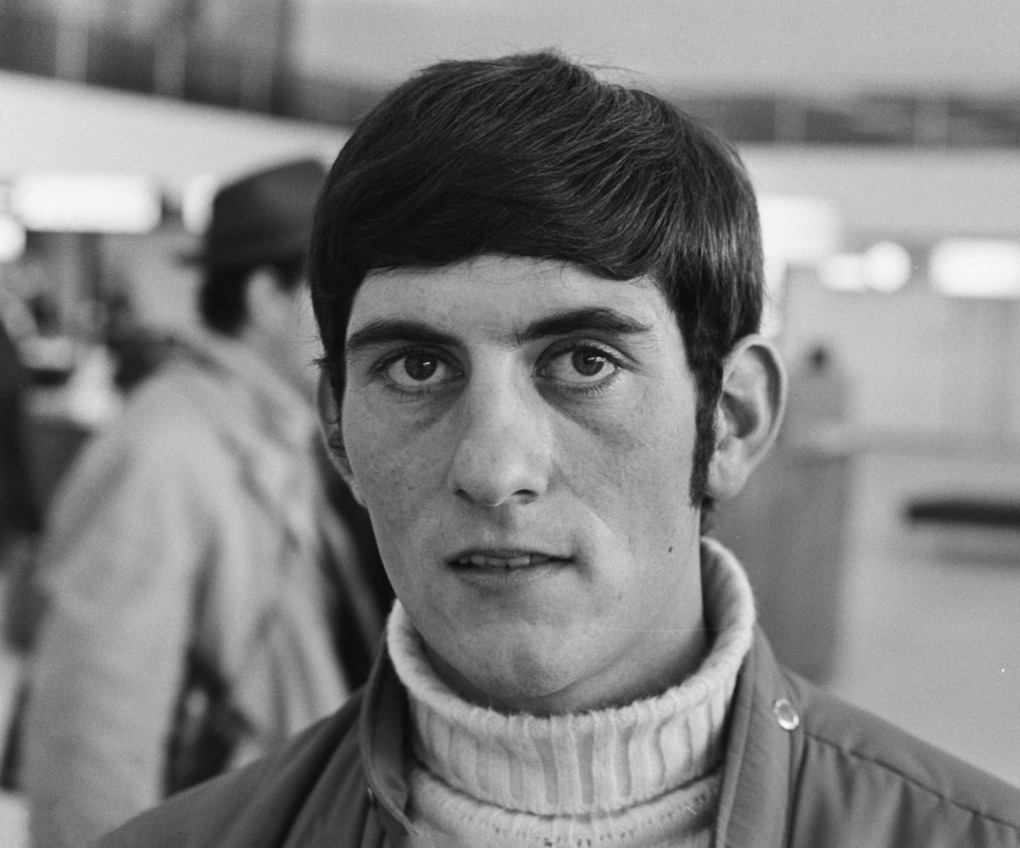
- Jan Bazen in 1970

Personal information
- Born: 3 January 1948 Zevenhuizen, Zuidplas, Netherlands
- Height: 1.79 m (5 ft 10 in)
- Weight: 76 kg (168 lb)

Sport
- Country: Netherlands
- Sport: Speed skating

Cornelis Jan Bazen (born 3 January 1948) is a former speed skater from the Netherlands. He dominated the national sprint championships in the early 1970s, winning them in 1970–1972, finishing second in 1973–1974 and third in 1975–1976. He competed at the 1976 Winter Olympics in the 500 m and finished in 6th place.

Personal bests:

- 500 m – 38.8 (1972)
- 1000 m – 1:18.1 (1976)
- 1500 m – 2:06.0 (1970)
- 5000 m – 8:42.1 (1968)
