= Lieuwe de Boer =

Dutch speed skater

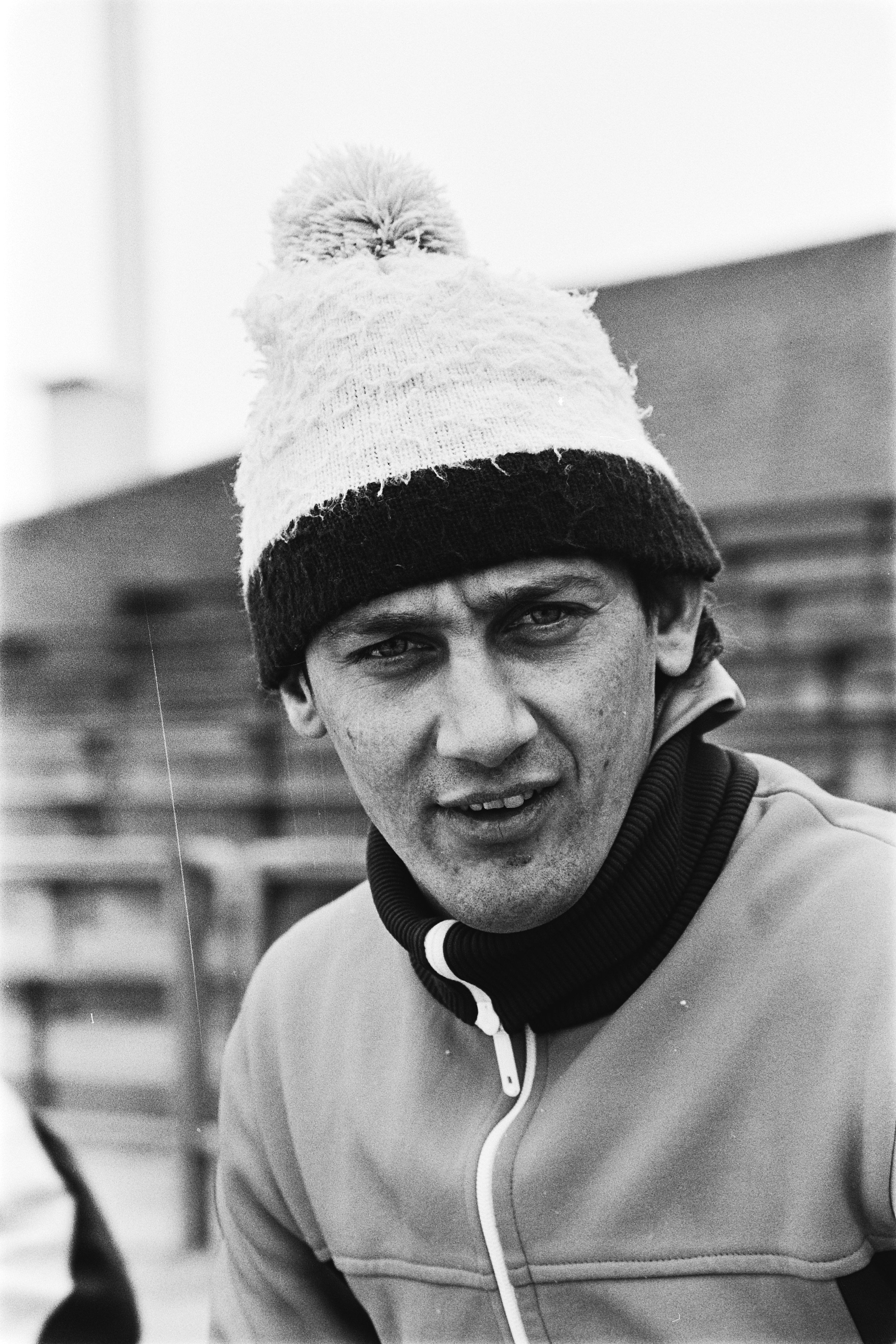

Personal information
- Born: 26 June 1951 (age 75) Ureterp, Netherlands

Sport
- Country: Netherlands
- Sport: Speed skating
Medal record
Men's speed skating
Representing the Netherlands
Olympic Games
Bronze medal – third place	1980 Lake Placid	500 metres

Lieuwe de Boer (born 26 June 1951) is a former ice speed skater from the Netherlands, who represented his native country at the 1980 Winter Olympics in Lake Placid, United States. There he won the bronze medal in the men's 500 metres.
