= Stefan Groothuis =

Dutch speed skater

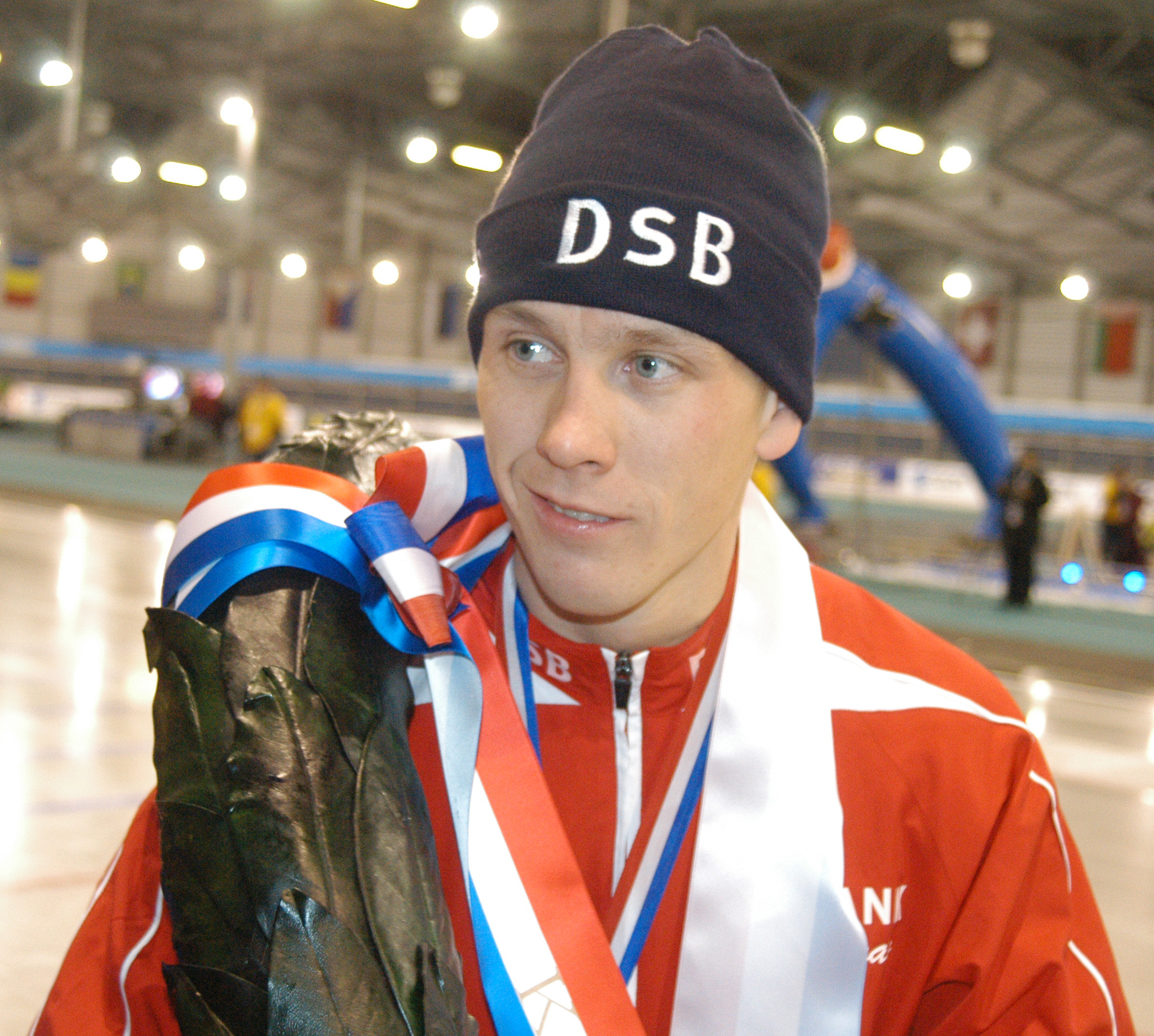
- Groothuis in 2009

Personal information
- Born: 23 November 1981 (age 44) Empe, Netherlands
- Height: 1.81 m (5 ft 11 in)
- Weight: 78 kg (172 lb)
- Website: www.stefangroothuis.nl

Sport
- Country: Netherlands
- Sport: Speed skating
- Turned pro: 2003
- Retired: 2016
Medal record
Men's speed skating
Representing the Netherlands
Olympic Games
Gold medal – first place	2014 Sochi	1000 m
World Sprint Championships
Gold medal – first place	2012 Calgary	Sprint
World Single Distance Championships
Gold medal – first place	2012 Heerenveen	1000 m
Bronze medal – third place	2011 Inzell	1000 m
Dutch Sprint Championships
Gold medal – first place	2006 Assen	Sprint
Gold medal – first place	2009 Heerenveen	Sprint
Gold medal – first place	2010 Groningen	Sprint
Gold medal – first place	2011 Heerenveen	Sprint
Gold medal – first place	2012 Heerenveen	Sprint
Gold medal – first place	2013 Groningen	Sprint
Dutch Single Distance Championships
Gold medal – first place	2009 Heerenveen	1000 m
Gold medal – first place	2010 Heerenveen	1000 m
Gold medal – first place	2012 Heerenveen	1000 m
Gold medal – first place	2012 Heerenveen	1500 m
Silver medal – second place	2007 Heerenveen	1000 m
Silver medal – second place	2011 Heerenveen	1000 m
Bronze medal – third place	2007 Heerenveen	500 m
Bronze medal – third place	2009 Heerenveen	500 m
Bronze medal – third place	2010 Heerenveen	1500 m
Bronze medal – third place	2011 Heerenveen	1500 m

Stefan Groothuis (born 23 November 1981) is a Dutch retired speed skater. He is the World Sprint Champion for 2012 and the gold medal winner in the 1000 metres at the 2014 Winter Olympics.

== Career ==
Groothuis, a specialist in the middle distances (1000 and 1500 metres), had his international breakthrough in 2005. In that year he reached a second spot during the Speed Skating World Cup meeting in Salt Lake City competing in the 1000 metres. This earned him a nomination for the 2006 Winter Olympics in Turin. During the Dutch Single Distance Championships in December 2005, he switched this nomination into a qualification by placing fourth behind Jan Bos, Erben Wennemars, and Beorn Nijenhuis, who all qualified as well.

In January 2006 Groothuis surprisingly became the Dutch national sprint champion, finishing first in two 500 metres and two 1000 metres races, outsprinting common names like Gerard van Velde, Nijenhuis, and Wennemars. A month later at the 2006 Winter Olympics, Groothuis would finish in eighth position in the 1000 metres. His time of 1:09.57 was 0.68 behind the winner Shani Davis.

In the 2010-2011 World Cup season, Groothuis would win the 1000 metre overall World Cup, dethroning perennial winner Shani Davis. He would also lead the 2011-2012 1000 metre standings going into the final race, but would be beaten out in the season finale by Davis and also just edged for the season 1000 title by Davis as a result.

At the 2012 World Sprint Speed Skating Championships in Calgary, Groothuis won the gold medal. His point total of 136.810 broke the world record for the sprint combination held by Jeremy Wotherspoon. He also won gold in the 1000 metres at the World Single Distance Championships that year.

== Personal records ==
Personal records
Men's speed skating
Event	Result	Date	Location	Notes
500 m	34.55	21 January 2012	Salt Lake City	
1000 m	1:06.96	29 January 2012	Calgary	
1500 m	1:43.48	4 December 2009	Calgary	
3000 m	3:53.72	16 March 2001	Calgary	
5000 m	6:54.59	20 March 2002	Calgary	
10000 m	14:41.70	21 March 2002	Calgary	

Source: SpeedskatingResults.com

== World record ==
Nr.	Event	Result	Date	Location	Note
1.	Sprint combination	136.810	29 January 2012	Calgary	World record until 28 January 2013

== Tournament overview ==
Season	Dutch Championships Single Distances	Dutch Championships Sprint	World Championships Sprint	World Championships Single Distances	Olympic Games	World Cup GWC	World Championships Junior Allround
2000–01	THE HAGUE 18th 500m 25th 1000m						GRONINGEN 7th 500m 12th 3000m (bronze) 1500m 12th 5000m 6th overall
2001–02	GRONINGEN 11th 500m 6th 1000m 12th 1500m	GRONINGEN 11th 500m 6th 1000m 9th 500m 9th 1000m 7th overall					
2002–03	UTRECHT 8th 500m 4th 1000m 16th 1500m	GRONINGEN 8th 500m 6th 1000m 9th 500m 5th 1000m 6th overall				29th 1000m	
2003–04	HEERENVEEN 7th 500m 9th 1000m 22nd 1500m	UTRECHT 8th 500m 6th 1000m 11th 500m 8th 1000m 8th overall					
2004–05	ASSEN 6th 500m 7th 1000m 5th 1500m	GRONINGEN 7th 500m 6th 1000m 7th 500m 6th 1000m 4th overall				24th 1000m 34th 1500m	
2005–06	HEERENVEEN 4th 1000m 8th 1500m	ASSEN 5th 500m (gold) 1000m 8th 500m (silver) 1000m (gold) overall	HEERENVEEN 30th 500m 11th 1000m 31st 500m 7th 1000m 17th overall		TURIN 8th 1000m	9th 1000m	
2006–07	ASSEN 6th 500m (silver) 1000m 8th 1500m	GRONINGEN 7th 500m (gold) 1000m 8th 500m 5th 1000m 5th overall				45th 500m 5th 1000m 9th 1500m	
2007–08							
2008–09	HEERENVEEN 4th 500m (gold) 1000m 5th 1500m	GRONINGEN (gold) 500m (gold) 1000m 4th 500m (gold) 1000m (gold) overall	MOSCOW 30th 500m (bronze) 1000m 12th 500m 5th 1000m 18th overall	VANCOUVER 15th 500m 4th 1000m 7th 1500m		27th 100m 19th 500m (bronze) 1000m 9th 1500m	
2009–10	HEERENVEEN 4th 500m (gold) 1000m (bronze) 1500m	GRONINGEN (silver) 500m (gold) 1000m (silver) 500m (gold) 1000m (gold) overall			VANCOUVER 4th 1000m 16th 1500m	23rd 500m (bronze) 1000m 6th 1500m	
2010–11	HEERENVEEN (bronze) 500m (silver) 1000m (bronze) 1500m	HEERENVEEN (silver) 500m (gold) 1000m (silver) 500m (gold) 1000m (gold) overall	HEERENVEEN (bronze) 500m (gold) 1000m 12th 500m (silver) 1000m 4th overall	INZELL (bronze) 1000m		15th 500m (gold) 1000m (bronze) 1500m	
2011–12	HEERENVEEN (bronze) 500m (gold) 1000m (gold) 1500m	HEERENVEEN (gold) 500m (silver) 1000m 9th 500m (gold) 1000m (gold) overall	CALGARY 9th 500m (silver) 1000m 12th 500m (gold) 1000m (gold) overall	HEERENVEEN (gold) 1000m 5th 1500m		15th 500m (silver) 1000m 6th 1500m (silver) GWC	
2012–13	HEERENVEEN 8th 500m 7th 1000m	GRONINGEN 5th 500m (gold) 1000m 4th 500m (bronze) 1000m (gold) overall	SALT LAKE CITY 18th 500m 4th 1000m 25th 500m 17th 1000m 17th overall	SOCHI 8th 1000m		7th 1000m 24th 1500m	
2013–14	HEERENVEEN 6th 500m 4th 1000m 7th 1500m	AMSTERDAM 8th 500m 12th 1000m 8th 500m (bronze) 1000m 6th overall			SOCHI 38th 500m (gold) 1000m 12th 1500m	41st 500m 8th 1000m 22nd 1500m	
2014–15	HEERENVEEN 10th 500m (silver) 1000m 11th 1500m	GRONINGEN 11th 500m (silver) 1000m 13th 500m 8th 1000m 5th overall		HEERENVEEN 6th 1000m		4th 1000m	
2015–16	HEERENVEEN 9th 500m (bronze) 1000m (bronze) 1500m			KOLOMNA 14th 1000m 14th 1500m		32nd 1000m	

== World Cup overview ==
Season	500 meter												
2002–2003													
2003–2004													
2004–2005													
2005–2006													
2006–2007	–	–	–	–	–	3rd(b)	–	–	–	–	–	–	–
2007–2008													
2008–2009	12th	17th	15th	17th	15th	14th	–	–	12th	14th	16th	9th	19th
2009–2010	11th	17th	12th	18th	11th(b)	DNF	–	–	14th	8th	–	–	
2010–2011	6th	7th	16th	13th	20th	16th	–	–	12th	10th	5th	–	
2011–2012	5th	12th	3rd place, bronze medalist(s)	–	12th	–	8th	–	4th	–	–	–	
2012–2013	–	–	–	–	–	–	–	13th(b)	–	–	–	-	
2013–2014	–	–	11th(b)	–	–	3rd(b)	–	–	–	–	–	–	
2014–2015													
2015–2016													

Season	1000 meter									
2002–2003	18th	17th	16th	18th	–	–	–	–	–	
2003–2004										
2004–2005	21st	20th	1st(b)	3rd(b)	–	–	–	–	–	
2005–2006	2nd place, silver medalist(s)	16th	7th	DQ	18th	3rd place, bronze medalist(s)	–	–	–	5th
2006–2007	7th	5th	18th	5th	3rd place, bronze medalist(s)	6th	6th	6th	4th	11th
2007–2008										
2008–2009	1st place, gold medalist(s)	6th	2nd place, silver medalist(s)	3rd place, bronze medalist(s)	–	–	2nd place, silver medalist(s)	2nd place, silver medalist(s)	6th	4th
2009–2010	DNF	1st(b)	4th	–	3rd place, bronze medalist(s)	2nd place, silver medalist(s)	2nd place, silver medalist(s)			
2010–2011	2nd place, silver medalist(s)	5th	1st place, gold medalist(s)	1st place, gold medalist(s)	–	1st place, gold medalist(s)	1st place, gold medalist(s)			
2011–2012	1st place, gold medalist(s)	1st place, gold medalist(s)	4th	3rd place, bronze medalist(s)	2nd place, silver medalist(s)	2nd place, silver medalist(s)	4th			
2012–2013	–	–	–	–	–	7th	8th	2nd place, silver medalist(s)	1st place, gold medalist(s)	
2013–2014	10th	DQ	7th	–	2nd place, silver medalist(s)	6th				
2014–2015	9th	2nd place, silver medalist(s)	6th	11th	6th	3rd place, bronze medalist(s)	10th			
2015–2016	DQ	5th(b)	–	3rd(b)	–	–	–			

Season	1500 meter					
2002–2003						
2003–2004						
2004–2005	–	3rd(b)	–	–	–	
2005–2006						
2006–2007	–	–	–	1st(b)	8th	5th
2007–2008						
2008–2009	10th	2nd place, silver medalist(s)	8th	11th	5th	–
2009/–010	4th	3rd place, bronze medalist(s)	17th	5th	–	5th
2010–2011	4th	3rd place, bronze medalist(s)	9th	4th	–	2nd place, silver medalist(s)
2011–2012	1st place, gold medalist(s)	6th	12th	3rd place, bronze medalist(s)	5th	15th
2012–2013	–	–	–	19th	1st(b)	18th
2013–2014	–	–	3rd(b)	–	11th	11th
2014–2015						
2015–2016						

– = Did not participate
(b) = Division B
DQ = Disqualified
DNF = Did not finish

== Medals won ==
Championship	Gold (gold)	Silver (silver)	Bronze (bronze)
Dutch Single Distances	4	3	4
Dutch Sprint	6	0	0
World Sprint	1	0	0
World Single Distances	1	0	1
World Cup 500m	0	0	1
World Cup 1000m	8	12	6
World Cup 1500m	1	2	3
World Cup classification	1	2	2
Olympic Games	1	0	0

== Career highlights ==
- 2001, 6th, Junior World Championships
- 2002, 6th, 1000 metres, Dutch National Single Distance Championships
- 2002, 7th, Dutch National Sprint Championships
- 2003, 4th, 1000 metres and 8th, 500 metres, Dutch National Single Distance Championships
- 2003, 6th, Dutch National Sprint Championships
- 2004, 6th, 500 metres and 9th, 1000 metres, Dutch National Single Distance Championships
- 2004, 8th, Dutch National Sprint Championships
- 2005, 5th, 1500 metres; 6th, 500 metres; and 7th, 1000 metres; Dutch National Single Distance Championships
- 2005, 4th, Dutch National Sprint Championships
- 2006, 4th, 1000 metres and 8th, 1500 metres, Dutch National Single Distance Championships
- 2006, 1st, Dutch National Sprint Championships
- 2006, 8th, 1000 metres, 2006 Winter Olympics
- 2006, 9th, 1000 metres, World Cup
- 2007, 2nd, 1000 metres; 6th, 500 metres; and 8th, 1500 metres; Dutch National Single Distance Championships
- 2014, 1st, 1000 metres, 2014 Winter Olympics

Source: www.sskating.com

Awards
Preceded by (Netherlands) Bob de Jong	Ard Schenk Award; 2012	Succeeded by Sven Kramer
