= 2011 KNSB Dutch Single Distance Championships – Men's 1000 m =

Dutch speed skating competition

- Venue: Thialf, Heerenveen
- Dates: 6 November 2010
- Competitors: 24

Medalist men
1st place, gold medalist(s)		Simon Kuipers	NED
2nd place, silver medalist(s)		Stefan Groothuis	NED
3rd place, bronze medalist(s)		Jan Bos	NED

The men's 1000 meter at the 2011 KNSB Dutch Single Distance Championships took place in Heerenveen at the Thialf ice skating rink on Saturday 6 November 2010. Although this tournament was held in 2010 it was part of the speed skating season 2010–2011. There were 24 participants.

== Statistics ==
=== Result ===
Position	Skater	Time
1st place, gold medalist(s)	Simon Kuipers	1:08.87
2nd place, silver medalist(s)	Stefan Groothuis	1:08.99
3rd place, bronze medalist(s)	Jan Bos	1:09.66
4	Hein Otterspeer	1:09.83 PR
5	Sjoerd de Vries	1:09.89
6	Lars Elgersma	1:09.97
7	Ronald Mulder	1:09.99
8	Pim Schipper	1:10.01
9	Rhian Ket	1:10.08
10	Koen Verweij	1:10.26 PR
11	Michel Mulder	1:10.28
12	Jan Smeekens	1:10.44
13	Allard Neijmeijer	1:10.93 PR
14	Tim Roelofsen	1:11.14
15	Thomas Krol	1:11.20 PR
16	Thom van Beek	1:11.69 PR
17	Robbert de Rijk	1:11.95
18	Joep Pennartz	1:12.14 PR
19	Stevin Hilbrands	1:12.28
20	Demian Roelofs	1:12.35
21	Rienk Nauta	1.12.59
NC	Jacques de Koning	DQ
NC	Remco Olde Heuvel	DQ
NC	Mark Tuitert	DQ

=== Draw ===
Heat	Inside lane	Outside lane
1	Rienk Nauta	Joep Pennartz
2	Allard Neijmeijer	Thomas Krol
3	Stevin Hilbrands	Thom van Beek
4	Tim Roelofsen	Robbert de Rijk
5	Koen Verweij	Pim Schipper
6	Hein Otterspeer	Demian Roelofs
7	Michel Mulder	Sjoerd de Vries
8	Jan Smeekens	Jacques de Koning
9	Lars Elgersma	Rhian Ket
10	Remco Olde Heuvel	Stefan Groothuis
11	Mark Tuitert	Simon Kuipers
12	Ronald Mulder	Jan Bos
