= 2010 KNSB Dutch Single Distance Championships – Men's 1000 m =

Dutch speed skating competition

- Venue: Thialf, Heerenveen
- Dates: 31 October 2009
- Competitors: 24

Medalist men
| 1st place, gold medalist(s) | | Stefan Groothuis | NED |
| 2nd place, silver medalist(s) | | Simon Kuipers | NED |
| 3rd place, bronze medalist(s) | | Mark Tuitert | NED |

The men's 1000 meter at the 2010 KNSB Dutch Single Distance Championships took place in Heerenveen at the Thialf ice skating rink on Saturday 31 October 2009. Although this tournament was held in 2009 it was part of the speed skating season 2009–2010. There were 24 participants.

== Statistics ==
=== Result ===
| Position | Skater | Time |
|---|---|---|
| 1st place, gold medalist(s) | Stefan Groothuis | 1:09.30 |
| 2nd place, silver medalist(s) | Simon Kuipers | 1:09.53 |
| 3rd place, bronze medalist(s) | Mark Tuitert | 1:09.57 |
| 4 | Lars Elgersma | 1:09.71 |
| 5 | Beorn Nijenhuis | 1:09.90 |
| 6 | Remco Olde Heuvel | 1:10.01 |
| 7 | Jan Bos | 1:10.11 |
| 8 | Ronald Mulder | 1:10.15 |
| 9 | Erben Wennemars | 1:10.28 |
| 10 | Jacques de Koning | 1:10.32 |
| 11 | Kjeld Nuis | 1:10.34 PR |
| 12 | Pim Schipper | 1:10.88 |
| 13 | Sietse Heslinga | 1:10.98 |
| 14 | Michael Poot | 1:11.07 |
| 15 | Sjoerd de Vries | 1:11.11 |
| 16 | Jan Smeekens | 1:11.16 |
| 17 | Michel Mulder | 1:11.18 |
| 18 | Tim Salomons | 1:11.23 |
| 19 | Hein Otterspeer | 1:11.32 PR |
| 20 | Berden de Vries | 1:11.51 |
| 21 | Jurre Trouw | 1:12.47 |
| 22 | Demian Roelofs | 1:12.47 PR |
| 23 | Freddy Wennemars | 1:12.49 |
| NC | Rhian Ket | DQ |

=== Draw ===
| Heat | Inside lane | Outside lane |
|---|---|---|
| 1 | Hein Otterspeer | Freddy Wennemars |
| 2 | Michel Mulder | Demian Roelofs |
| 3 | Michael Poot | Jan Smeekens |
| 4 | Jurre Trouw | Berden de Vries |
| 5 | Jacques de Koning | Kjeld Nuis |
| 6 | Lars Elgersma | Ronald Mulder |
| 7 | Sietse Heslinga | Rhian Ket |
| 8 | Pim Schipper | Tim Salomons |
| 9 | Erben Wennemars | Stefan Groothuis |
| 10 | Beorn Nijenhuis | Jan Bos |
| 11 | Sjoerd de Vries | Remco Olde Heuvel |
| 12 | Simon Kuipers | Mark Tuitert |
