= Netherlands at the 2010 Winter Olympics =

- Flag of the Netherlands
- IOC code: NED
- NOC: Dutch Olympic Committee*; Dutch Sports Federation
- Website: www.nocnsf.nl (in Dutch)

in Vancouver
- Competitors: 34 in 4 sports
- Flag bearer (opening): Timothy Beck (bobsleigh)
- Flag bearer (closing): Sven Kramer (speed skating)
- Medals Ranked 10th: Gold 4 Silver 1 Bronze 3 Total 8

Winter Olympics appearances (overview)
- 1928; 1932; 1936; 1948; 1952; 1956; 1960; 1964; 1968; 1972; 1976; 1980; 1984; 1988; 1992; 1994; 1998; 2002; 2006; 2010; 2014; 2018; 2022; 2026

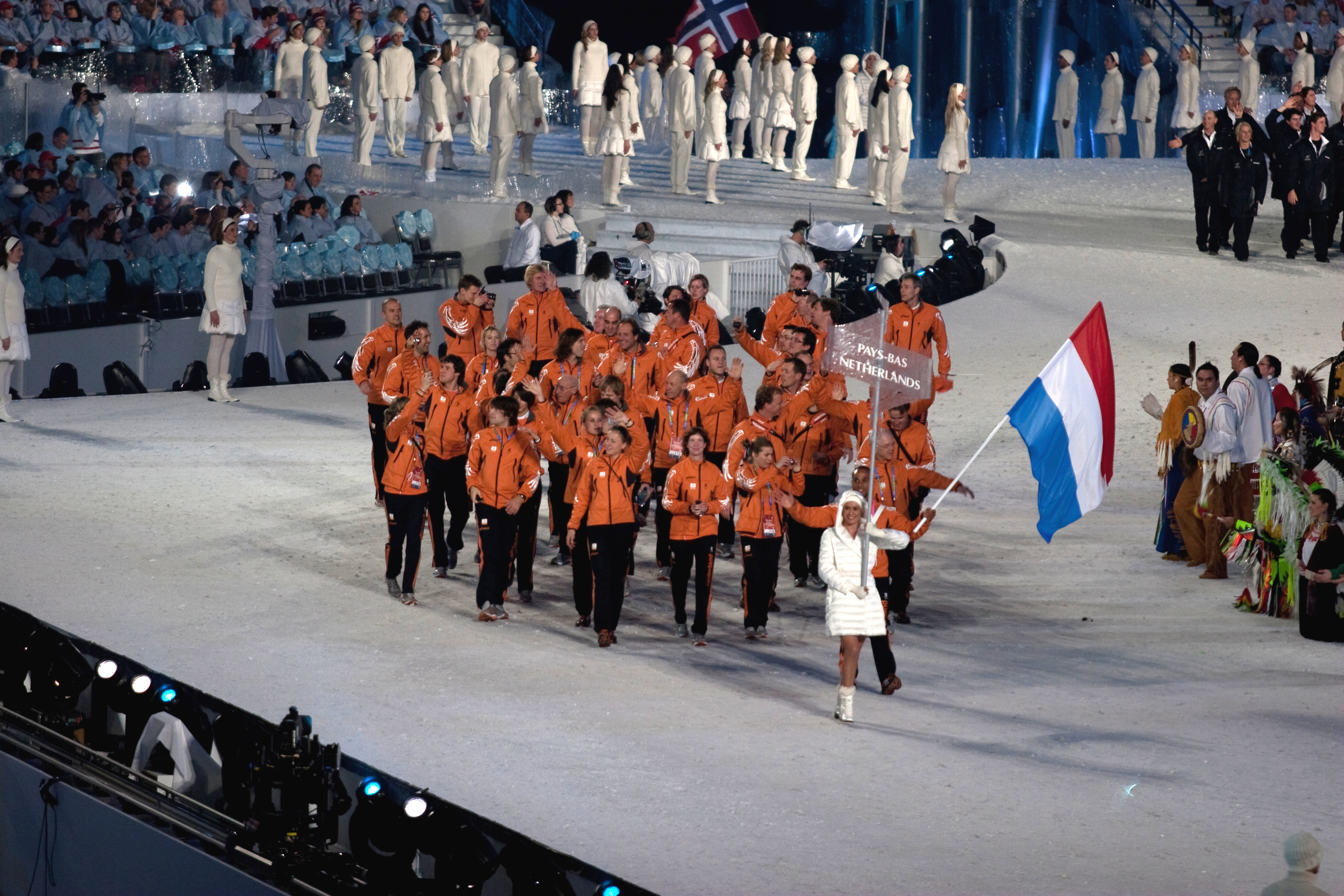
The athletes entering the stadium during the opening ceremonies.

The Netherlands participated at the 2010 Winter Olympics in Vancouver, British Columbia, Canada. The Dutch team consisted of 34 competitors and participated in bobsleigh, short track speed skating, snowboarding, and speed skating.

The Dutch team won eight medals, of which four are gold medals. Seven medals were won in speed skating, one in snowboarding. The gold medal Nicolien Sauerbreij won on the women's parallel giant slalom was the first Dutch medal outside speed skating at the Winter Olympics since Sjoukje Dijkstra's medal for figure skating in 1964 and the 100th Dutch gold medal at the Olympics overall. This was also the first medal for the Netherlands at the Winter Olympics at a snow event.

== Records ==
=== Olympic record ===
Sven Kramer set a new Olympic record of 6:14.60 in the 5000m men's longtrack speedskating event. He also finished in an Olympic record time in the 10,000 m, but he was disqualified for finishing in the wrong lane.

Jan Blokhuijsen, Sven Kramer, Simon Kuipers and Mark Tuitert set a new Olympic record of 3:39.95 in the men's team pursuit longtrack speedskating event. It brought them no more than the bronze medal, since they had lost their semifinal before.

=== Track records ===
Mark Tuitert set a new track record of 1:45.57 in the men's 1500m longtrack speedskating event. Ireen Wüst equalled the track record of 1:56.89 in the women's 1500 m race. The above-mentioned 5,000 m and men's team pursuit Olympic records were also track records.

== Medalists ==
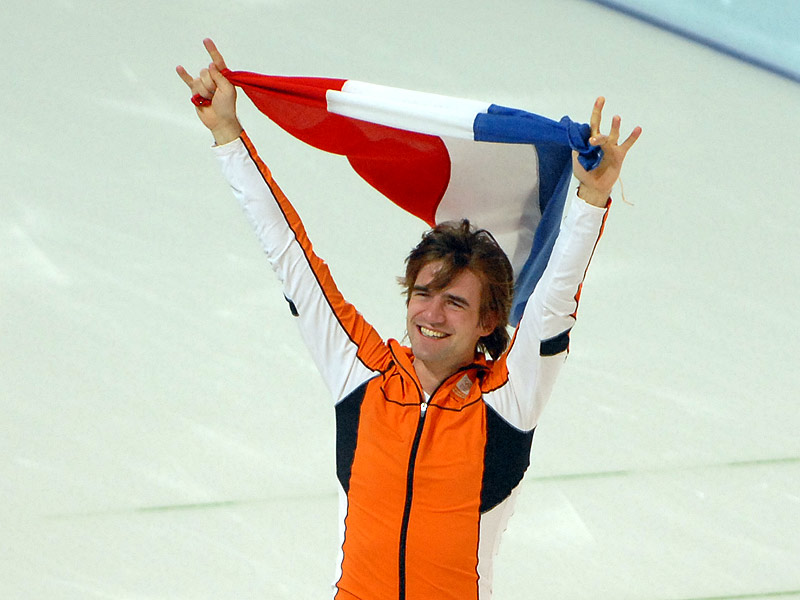
Gold medalist 1,500 m speed skating Mark Tuitert

Medal	Name	Sport	Event
Gold	Sven Kramer	Speed skating	Men's 5000 metres
Gold	Mark Tuitert	Speed skating	Men's 1500 metres
Gold	Ireen Wüst	Speed skating	Women's 1500 metres
Gold	Nicolien Sauerbreij	Snowboarding	Women's parallel giant slaloms
Silver	Annette Gerritsen	Speed skating	Women's 1000 metres
Bronze	Laurine van Riessen	Speed skating	Women's 1000 metres
Bronze	Bob de Jong	Speed skating	Men's 10,000 metres
Bronze	Jan Blokhuijsen; Sven Kramer; Simon Kuipers; Mark Tuitert	Speed skating	Men's team pursuit

== Bobsleigh ==
Men & Women

Event	Athlete	Run 1		Run 2		Run 3		Run 4		Total	
Event	Athlete	Time	Rank	Time	Rank	Time	Rank	Time	Rank	Time	Rank
Two-man	Edwin van Calker; Sybren Jansma	52.37	14	52.83	15	52.63	17	52.62	16	3:30.45	16
Two-woman	Esmé Kamphuis; Tine Veenstra	53.81	9	53.59	10	54.09	12	53.65	6	3:35.14	8
Four-man	Edwin van Calker; Sybren Jansma; Arnold van Calker; Timothy Beck	Pre-competition withdrawal									

== Short track speed skating ==
Men

Event	Athlete	Heat		Quarterfinal		Semifinal		Final	
Event	Athlete	Time	Position	Time	Position	Time	Position	Time	Position
500 m	Niels Kerstholt	42.180	2 Q	42.128	4	Did not advance			
500 m	Sjinkie Knegt	44.448	4	Did not advance					
1000 m	Sjinkie Knegt	1:25.449	2 Q	1:26.176	3	Did not advance			
1500 m	Niels Kerstholt	2:46.222	5 ADV			2:16.352	7	Did not advance	
1500 m	Sjinkie Knegt	2:14.862	2 Q			2:13.870	5	Did not advance	

Women

Event	Athlete	Heat		Quarterfinal		Semifinal		Final	
Event	Athlete	Time	Position	Time	Position	Time	Position	Time	Position
500 m	Annita van Doorn	44.751	3	Did not advance					
500 m	Liesbeth Mau Asam	45.135	4	Did not advance					
500 m	Jorien Ter Mors	45.120	3	Did not advance					
1000 m	Annita van Doorn	1:31.516	2 Q	1:32.067	3	Did not advance			
1000 m	Liesbeth Mau Asam	-	DSQ	Did not advance					
1000 m	Jorien Ter Mors	-	DSQ	Did not advance					
3000 m relay	Annita van Doorn; Liesbeth Mau Asam; Jorien ter Mors; Sanne van Kerkhof; Maaike Vos					4:16.520	3 QB	4:16.120	4

== Snowboarding ==
Women

Event	Athlete	Qualification		1st round	Quarterfinals	Semifinals	Finals	
Event	Athlete	Time	Rank	Opposition time	Opposition time	Opposition time	Opposition time	Rank
Women's parallel giant slalom	Nicolien Sauerbreij	1:23.18	2 Q	(Germany) Isabella Laboeck; W +17.98	(Austria) Claudia Riegler; W +0.30	(Germany) Selina Jörg; W DNF	(Russia) Ekaterina Ilyukhina; W +0.23	1st place, gold medalist(s)

Men

Event	Athlete	Qualification			Semifinals			Finals		
Event	Athlete	Run 1	Run 2	Rank	Run 1	Run 2	Rank	Run 1	Run 2	Rank
Men's halfpipe	Dolf van der Wal	14.5	11.8	18	Did not advance					

== Speed skating ==
Men

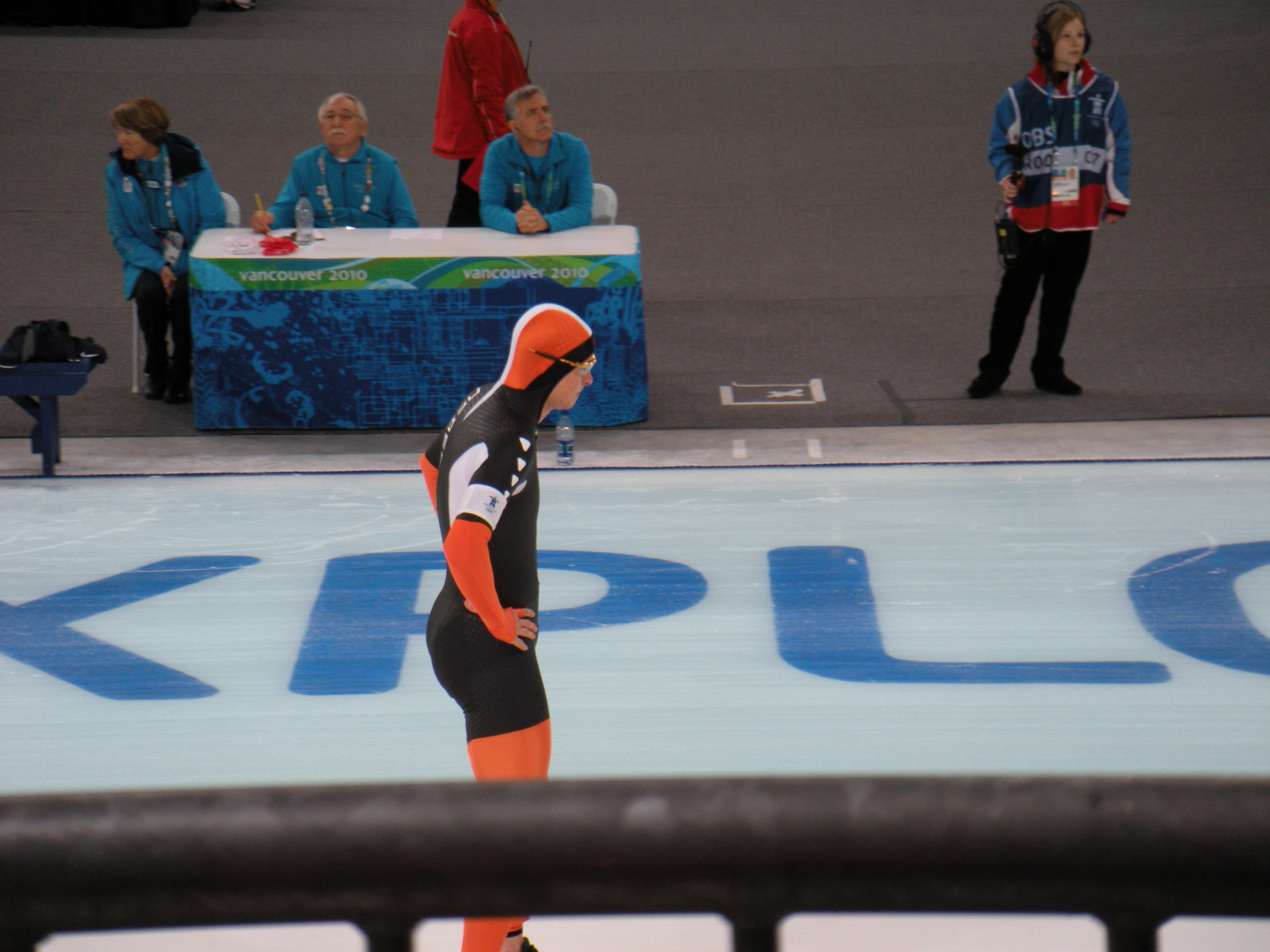
Sven Kramer before his gold 5,000 m

Event	Athlete	Race 1		Race 2		Final	
Event	Athlete	Time	Rank	Time	Rank	Time	Rank
500 m	Jan Bos	36.149	31	36.111	29	72.26	29
500 m	Simon Kuipers	35.662	23	35.669	20	71.33	20
500 m	Ronald Mulder	35.155	11	35.146	10	70.30	11
500 m	Jan Smeekens	35.160	12	35.051	4	70.21	6
1000 m	Jan Bos					1:10.29	12
1000 m	Stefan Groothuis					1:09.45	4
1000 m	Simon Kuipers					1:09.65	6
1000 m	Mark Tuitert					1:09.48	5
1500 m	Stefan Groothuis					1:48.03	16
1500 m	Sven Kramer					1:47.40	13
1500 m	Simon Kuipers					1:46.76	7
1500 m	Mark Tuitert					1:45.57 TR	1st place, gold medalist(s)
5000 m	Jan Blokhuijsen					6:26.30	9
5000 m	Bob de Jong					6:19.02	5
5000 m	Sven Kramer					6:14.60 OR	1st place, gold medalist(s)
10,000 m	Bob de Jong					13:06.73	3rd place, bronze medalist(s)
10,000 m	Arjen van der Kieft					13:33.37	9
10,000 m	Sven Kramer					DSQ	—

Event	Athletes	Quarterfinal	Semifinal	Final	
Event	Athletes	Opposition time	Opposition time	Opposition time	Rank
Team pursuit	Jan Blokhuijsen; Sven Kramer; Simon Kuipers; Mark Tuitert	(Sweden) Sweden; 3:44.25 Q	(United States) United States; 3:43.11 QB	(Norway) Norway; 3:39.95 OR	3rd place, bronze medalist(s)

Women

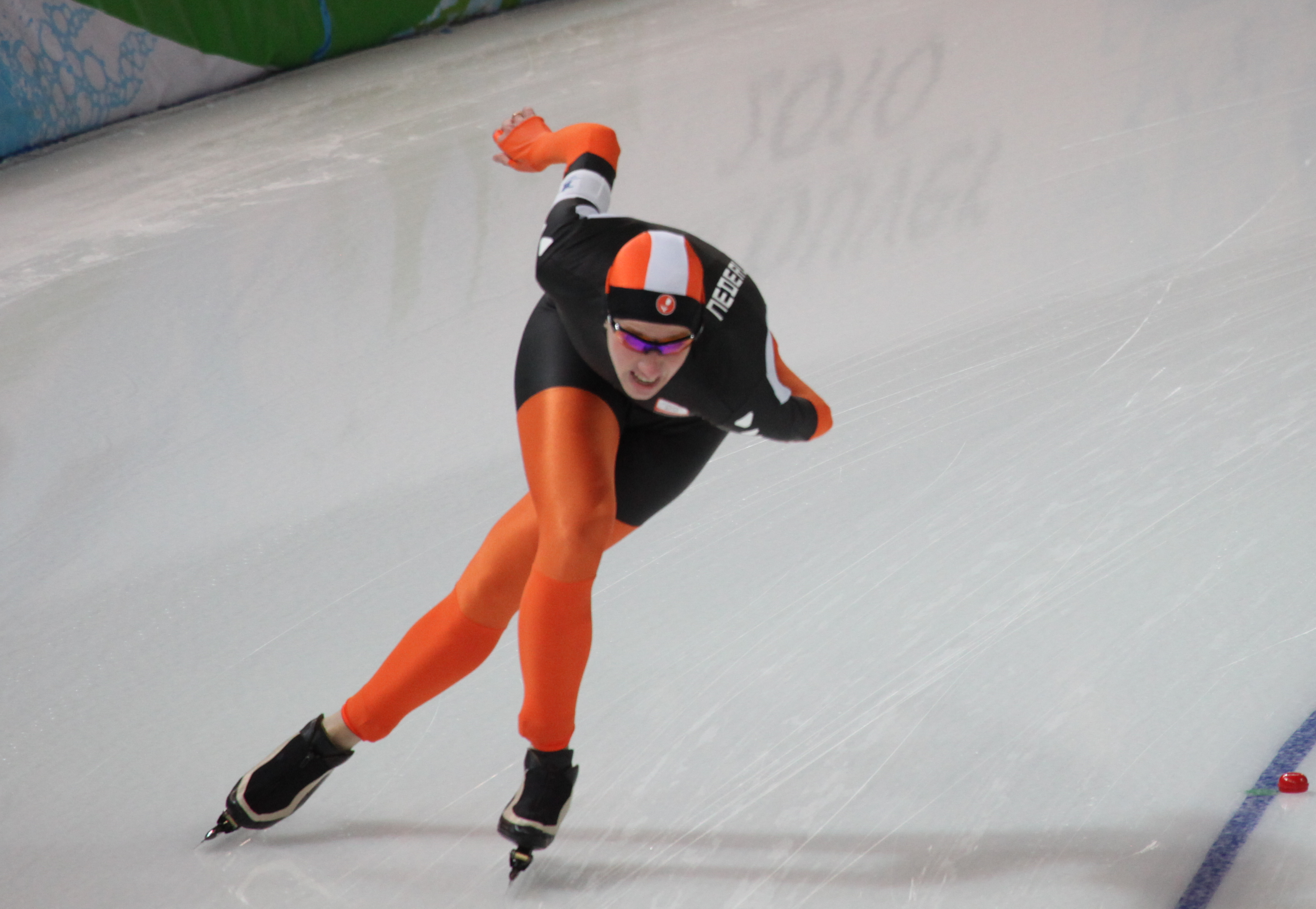
Jorien Voorhuis during her 5,000 m

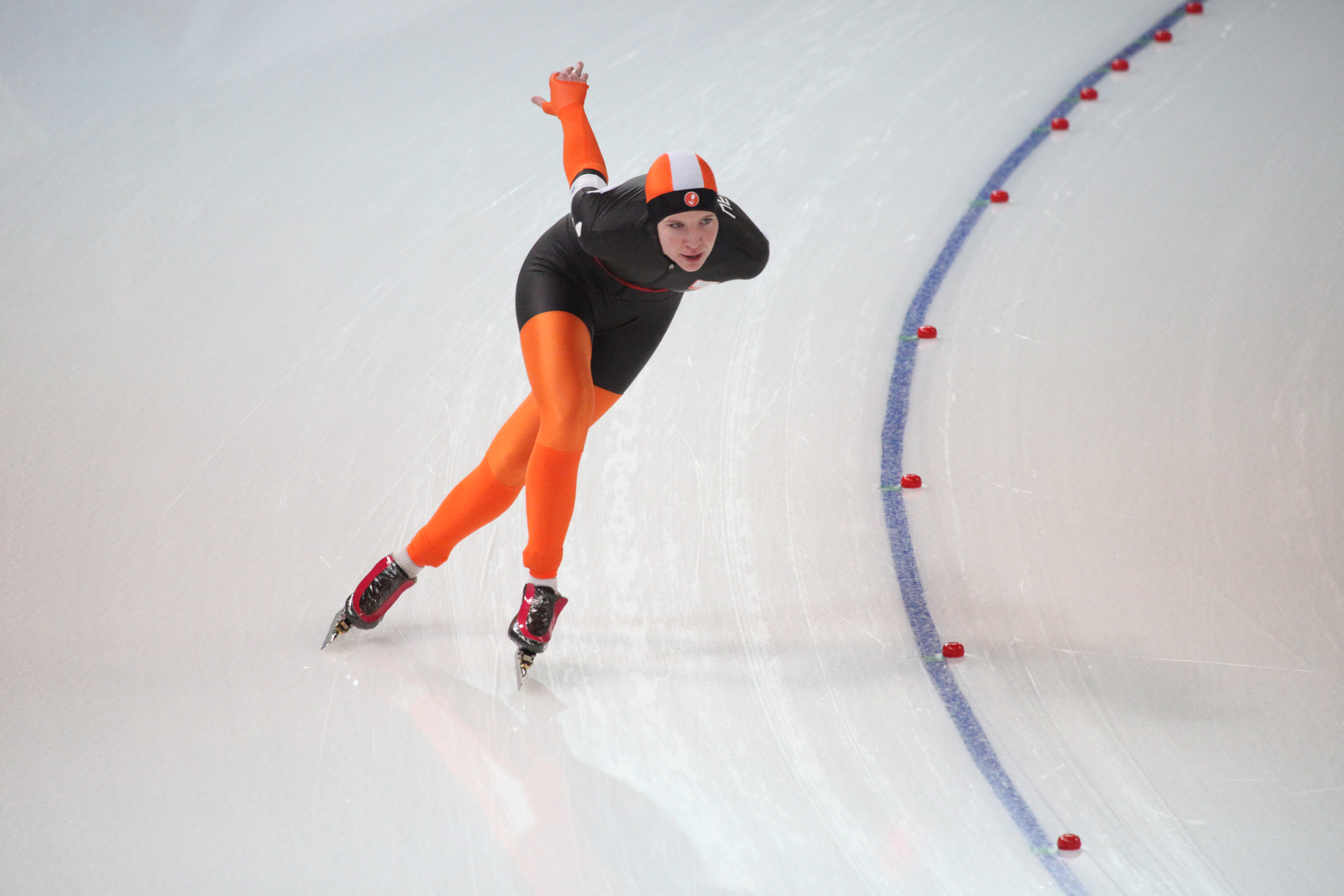
Elma de Vries during her 5,000 m

Event	Athlete	Race 1		Race 2		Final	
Event	Athlete	Time	Rank	Time	Rank	Time	Rank
500 m	Margot Boer	38.511	4	38.365	4	76.87	4
500 m	Annette Gerritsen	97.952	36	38.709	9	136.66	35
500 m	Thijsje Oenema	38.892	14	38.869	17	77.76	15
500 m	Laurine van Riessen	39.302	21	38.845	15	78.15	19
1000 m	Margot Boer					1:16.94	6
1000 m	Annette Gerritsen					1:16.58	2nd place, silver medalist(s)
1000 m	Laurine van Riessen					1:16.72	3rd place, bronze medalist(s)
1000 m	Ireen Wüst					1:17.28	8
1500 m	Margot Boer					1:58.10	4
1500 m	Annette Gerritsen					1:58.46	7
1500 m	Laurine van Riessen					1:59.79	17
1500 m	Ireen Wüst					1:56.89	1st place, gold medalist(s)
3000 m	Renate Groenewold					4:11.25	10
3000 m	Diane Valkenburg					4:11.71	11
3000 m	Ireen Wüst					4:08.09	7
5000 m	Jorien Voorhuis					7:13.27	10
5000 m	Elma de Vries					7:16.68	11

Event	Athletes	Quarterfinal	Semifinal	Final	
Event	Athletes	Opposition time	Opposition time	Opposition time	Rank
Team pursuit	Renate Groenewold; Ireen Wüst; Diane Valkenburg; Jorien Voorhuis	(Germany) Germany; 3:03.38 QC		(Canada) Canada; 3:02.04	6

== See also ==
- Netherlands at the 2010 Winter Paralympics
- Netherlands at the Olympics
