= 2012 KNSB Dutch Single Distance Championships – Men's 1000 m =

Dutch speed skating competition

- Venue: Thialf, Heerenveen
- Dates: 5 November 2011
- Competitors: 24

Medalist men
1st place, gold medalist(s)		Stefan Groothuis	NED
2nd place, silver medalist(s)		Sjoerd de Vries	NED
3rd place, bronze medalist(s)		Kjeld Nuis	NED

The men's 1000 meter at the 2012 KNSB Dutch Single Distance Championships took place in Heerenveen at the Thialf ice skating rink on Saturday 5 November 2011. Although this tournament was held in 2011 it was part of the speed skating season 2011–2012. There were 24 participants.

== Statistics ==
=== Result ===
Position	Skater	Time
1st place, gold medalist(s)	Stefan Groothuis	1:08.68
2nd place, silver medalist(s)	Sjoerd de Vries	1:09.15
3rd place, bronze medalist(s)	Kjeld Nuis	1:09.50
4	Michel Mulder	1:09.57
5	Pim Schipper	1:09.75
6	Mark Tuitert	1:09.79
7	Lars Elgersma	1:09.80
8	Ronald Mulder	1:09.95
9	Rhian Ket	1:10.02
10	Maurice Vriend	1:10.73 PR
11	Remco Olde Heuvel	1:10.76
12	Simon Kuipers	1:10.77
13	Thomas Krol	1:11.16 PR
14	Jan Smeekens	1:11.44
15	Lucas van Alphen	1:11.66 PR
16	Jesper van Veen	1:11.67
17	Karsten van Zeijl	1:11.87 PR
18	Lieuwe Mulder	1:11.98 PR
19	Jesper Hospes	1:12.16
20	Kai Verbij	1:12.29 PR
21	Aron Romeijn	1:12.38
22	Rens Boekhoff	1:12.41
23	Wietse van der Heide	1:13.23
NC	Hein Otterspeer	DQ

=== Draw ===
Heat	Inside lane	Outside lane
1	Kai Verbij	Lieuwe Mulder
2	Wietse van der Heide	Karsten van Zeijl
3	Aron Romeijn	Lucas van Alphen
4	Jesper Hospes	Maurice Vriend
5	Thomas Krol	Pim Schipper
6	Michel Mulder	Rhian Ket
7	Remco Olde Heuvel	Rens Boekhoff
8	Jesper van Veen	Jan Smeekens
9	Sjoerd de Vries	Stefan Groothuis
10	Ronald Mulder	Lars Elgersma
11	Simon Kuipers	Kjeld Nuis
12	Mark Tuitert	Hein Otterspeer
