= 2012 KNSB Dutch Single Distance Championships =

KNSB Dutch Single Distance Championships
- Venue: Thialf, Heerenveen
- Dates: 4–6 November 2011

The 2012 KNSB Dutch Single Distance Championships were a speed skating event held at the Thialf ice stadium in Heerenveen from 4 November until 6 November 2011. Although the tournament was held in 2011 it was the 2012 edition as it is part of the 2011/2012 speed skating season.

== Schedule ==
Schedule
Date	Time	Distance
Friday; 4 November 2011	16:00	Men's 5000 meter Women's 500 meter 1st run Men's 500 meter 1st run
Saturday; 5 November 2011	13:00	Women's 500 meter 2nd run Men's 500 meter 2nd run Women's 1000 meter Men's 1000 meter Women's 3000 meter
Sunday; 6 November 2011	12:00	Women's 1500 meter Men's 1500 meter Women's 5000 meter Men's 10,000 meter

== Medalists ==
=== Men ===
Distance	Gold		Silver		Bronze	
2x500 m details	Jan Smeekens; Control	70.600 (35.08/35.52)	Michel Mulder; APPM	70.610 (35.20/35.41)	Stefan Groothuis; Control	70.850 (35.27/35.58)
1000 m details	Stefan Groothuis; Control	1:08.68	Sjoerd de Vries; APPM	1:09.15	Kjeld Nuis; Control	1:09.50
1500 m details	Stefan Groothuis; Control	1:46.26	Kjeld Nuis; Control	1:46.88	Sjoerd de Vries; APPM	1:46.89
5000 m details	Jorrit Bergsma; BAM	6:17.84	Bob de Jong; BAM	6:18.72	Sven Kramer; TVM	6:19.35
10,000 m details	Bob de Jong; BAM	12:57.29	Jorrit Bergsma; BAM	13:00.45	Sven Kramer; TVM	13:09.96

Men's results: Schaatsen.nl & SchaatsStatistieken.nl

=== Women ===
Distance	Gold		Silver		Bronze	
2x500 m details	Thijsje Oenema; Team Op=Op	77.090 (38.41/38.68)	Margot Boer; Team Liga	77.480 (38.65/38.83)	Annette Gerritsen; Team Liga	77.780 (38.93/38.94)
1000 m details	Thijsje Oenema; Team Op=Op	1:16.53	Marrit Leenstra; Team Hart	1:16.79	Ireen Wüst; TVM	1:16.88
1500 m details	Ireen Wüst; TVM	1:57.77	Marrit Leenstra; Team Hart	1:57.91	Diane Valkenburg; Control	1:59.31
3000 m details	Pien Keulstra; Jong Oranje	4:09.75	Diane Valkenburg; Control	4:10.37	Ireen Wüst; TVM	4:10.58
5000 m details	Pien Keulstra; Jong Oranje	7:12.55	Carlijn Achtereekte; Team Op=Op	7:15.31	Annouk van der Weijden; Team Op=Op	7:15.89

Women's results: Schaatsen.nl & SchaatsStatistieken.nl
