= 2012 KNSB Dutch Single Distance Championships – Men's 500 m =

Dutch speed skating competition

- Venue: Thialf, Heerenveen
- Dates: 4–6 November 2011
- Competitors: 24

Medalist men
1st place, gold medalist(s)		Jan Smeekens	NED
2nd place, silver medalist(s)		Michel Mulder	NED
3rd place, bronze medalist(s)		Stefan Groothuis	NED

The men's 500 meter at the 2012 KNSB Dutch Single Distance Championships took place in Heerenveen at the Thialf ice skating rink on 4–6 November 2011. It consisted of twice 500 meter where the speed skaters started once in the inner and once in the outer lane. Although this tournament was held in 2011 it was part of the speed skating season 2011–2012. There were 24 participants.

== Statistics ==
=== Result ===
Position	Skater	Time 1st 500m	Time 2nd 500m	Total points Samalog
1st place, gold medalist(s)	Jan Smeekens	35.08 (1)	35.52 (3)	70.600
2nd place, silver medalist(s)	Michel Mulder	35.20 (2)	35.41 (2)	70.610
3rd place, bronze medalist(s)	Stefan Groothuis	35.27 (4)	35.58 (6)	70.850
4	Jesper Hospes	35.26 (3) PR	36.63 (8)	70.890
5	Hein Otterspeer	35.42 (6)	35.53 (4)	70.950
6	Ronald Mulder	35.76 (11)	35.31 (1)	71.070
7	Kjeld Nuis	35.48 (7) PR	35.67 (9)	71.150
8	Mark Tuitert	35.41 (5)	35.75 (11)	71.160
9	Sjoerd de Vries	35.635 (9)	35.622 (7)	71.257
10	Pim Schipper	35.584 (8) PR	35.674 (9)	71.258
11	Simon Kuipers	35.90 (12)	35.55 (5)	71.450
12	Jesper van Veen	36.44 (16)	36.29 (12) PR	72.730
13	Rens Boekhoff	36.32 (13) PR	36.53 (14)	72.850 PR
14	Maurice Vriend	36.40 (14) PR	35.56 (16)	72.960 PR
15	Lieuwe Mulder	36.43 (15) PR	36.54 (15)	72.970 PR
16	Bas Bervoets	36.73 (19)	36.42 (13) PR	73.150
17	Niels Olivier	36.54 (18) PR	36.63 (18)	73.170 PR
18	Freddy Wennemars	36.46 (17)	36.89 (22)	73.350
19	Aron Romeijn	36.76 (20) PR	36.61 (17) PR	73.370
20	Jacques de Koning	36.81 (21)	36.72 (19)	73.530
21	Kai Verbij	36.81 (21)	36.78 (21)	73.590
22	Allard Neijmeijer	37.05 (23)	36.73 (20)	73.780
NC	Lars Elgersma	35.70 (10)	WDR	
NC	Ruben Romeijn	DQ		

=== Draw 1st 500 meter ===
Heat	Inside lane	Outside lane
1	Ruben Romeijn	Niels Olivier
2	Aron Romeijn	Allard Neijmeijer
3	Kai Verbij	Maurice Vriend
4	Lieuwe Mulder	Bas Bervoets
5	Lars Elgersma	Freddy Wennemars
6	Rens Boekhoff	Pim Schipper
7	Mark Tuitert	Jesper Hospes
8	Sjoerd de Vries	Jesper van Veen
9	Ronald Mulder	Hein Otterspeer
10	Jacques de Koning	Jan Smeekens
11	Stefan Groothuis	Kjeld Nuis
12	Michel Mulder	Simon Kuipers

=== Draw 2nd 500 meter ===
Heat	Inside lane	Outside lane
1	Allard Neijmeijer	
2	Bas Bervoets	Kai Verbij
3	Niels Olivier	Jacques de Koning
4	Freddy Wennemars	Aron Romeijn
5	Jesper van Veen	Lieuwe Mulder
6	Maurice Vriend	Rens Boekhoff
7	Simon Kuipers	Ronald Mulder
8	Pim Schipper	Lars Elgersma
9	Kjeld Nuis	Sjoerd de Vries
10	Hein Otterspeer	Mark Tuitert
11	Jesper Hospes	Stefan Groothuis
12	Jan Smeekens	Michel Mulder
