= 2012 KNSB Dutch Sprint Championships =

KNSB Dutch Sprint Championships
- Venue: Thialf, Heerenveen
- Dates: 29 and 30 December 2011
- Competitors: 46

Medalist men
1st place, gold medalist(s)		Stefan Groothuis	NED
2nd place, silver medalist(s)		Hein Otterspeer	NED
3rd place, bronze medalist(s)		Sjoerd de Vries	NED

Medalist women
1st place, gold medalist(s)		Margot Boer	NED
2nd place, silver medalist(s)		Thijsje Oenema	NED
3rd place, bronze medalist(s)		Marrit Leenstra	NED

The 2012 KNSB Dutch Sprint Championships in speed skating were held at the Thialf ice stadium in Heerenveen, Netherlands.

== Schedule ==
Schedule
Date	Event
29 December 2012	Women's 500m 1st run Men's 500m 1st run Women's 1000m 1st run Men's 1000m 1st run
30 December 2012	Women's 500m 2nd run Men's 500m 2nd run Women's 1000m 2nd run Men's 1000m 2nd run

== Medalist ==
Event	Gold		Silver		Bronze	
Women's Sprint	Margot Boer	153.495	Thijsje Oenema	154.035	Marrit Leenstra	154.120
Men's Sprint	Stefan Groothuis	139.690	Hein Otterspeer	139.865	Sjoerd de Vries	140.385

== Results ==
=== Men's Sprint ===
Place	Athlete	500m	1000m	500m	1000m	Points
1st place, gold medalist(s)	Stefan Groothuis	0:35.09 (1)	1:09.11 (2)	0:35.62 (9)	1:08.85 (1)	139.690
2nd place, silver medalist(s)	Hein Otterspeer	0:35.23 (3)	1:08.82 (1)	0:35.20 (2)	1:10.05 (9)	139.865
3rd place, bronze medalist(s)	Sjoerd de Vries	0:35.38 (6)	1:09.64 (5)	0:35.45 (5)	1:09.47 (4)	140.385
4	Pim Schipper	0:35.51 (7)	1:09.61 (4)	0:35.50 (7)	1:09.40 (3)	140.515
5	Michel Mulder	0:35.63 (8)	1:10.81 (10)	0:35.07 (1)	1:09.36 (2)	140.785
6	Lars Elgersma	0:35.76 (9)	1:09.69 (6)	0:35.47 (6)	1:09.61 (6)	140.880
7	Ronald Mulder	0:35.34 (5)	1:10.60 (9)	0:35.40 (4)	1:10.10 (10)	141.090
8	Mark Tuitert	0:35.82 (11)	1:09.77 (8)	0:35.68 (11)	1:09.52 (5)	141.145
9	Remco olde Heuvel	0:35.79 (10)	1:09.69 (6)	0:35.85 (12)	1:09.75 (8)	141.360
10	Jan Smeekens	0:35.31 (4)	1:11.97 (18)	0:35.28 (3)	1:11.00 (12)	142.075
11	Jesper Hospes	0:35.22 (2)	1:12.32 (21)	0:35.64 (10)	1:11.22 (15)	142.630
12	Kai Verbij	0:36.28 (12)	1:11.14 (12)	0:36.17 (13)	1:11.08 (13)	143.560
13	Maurice Vriend	0:36.62 (18)	1:10.91 (11)	0:36.49 (17)	1:10.83 (11)	143.980
14	Lucas van Alphen	0:36.58 (17)	1:11.19 (13)	0:36.35 (15)	1:11.16 (14)	144.105
15	Bas Bervoets	0:36.35 (13)	1:12.09 (20)	0:36.32 (14)	1:11.32 (16)	144.375
16	Rens Boekhoff	0:36.46 (15)	1:11.92 (17)	0:36.46 (16)	1:11.47 (18)	144.615
17	Jesper van Veen	0:36.39 (14)	1:11.72 (15)	0:36.81 (20)	1:11.86 (21)	144.990
18	Aron Romeijn	0:36.48 (16)	1:12.00 (19)	0:36.55 (18)	1:11.96 (22)	145.010
19	Frank Hermans	0:37.03 (20)	1:11.24 (14)	0:36.92 (23)	1:11.58 (20)	145.360
20	Lennart Velema	0:37.10 (21)	1:11.82 (16)	0:36.79 (19)	1:11.37 (17)	145.485
21	Thom van Beek	0:37.44 (22)	1:12.34 (22)	0:36.87 (21)	1:11.48 (19)	146.220
22	Rienk Nauta	0:37.02 (19)	1:12.62 (23)	0:36.90 (22)	1:12.82 (23)	146.640
23	Kjeld Nuis	1:09.85 (24f)	1:09.25 (3)	0:35.60 (8)	1:09.71 (7)	174.930
DNS2	Rhian Ket	1:00.86 (23)	DNS	DNS	DNS	60.860

Men's results: SchaatsStatistieken.nl

=== Women's Sprint ===
Place	Athlete	500m	1000m	500m	1000m	Points
1st place, gold medalist(s)	Margot Boer	38.62 (3)	1:16.45 (2)	38.40 (2)	1:16.50 (3)	153.495
2nd place, silver medalist(s)	Thijsje Oenema	38.52 (1)	1:17.14 (6)	38.31 (1)	1:17.27 (6)	154.035
3rd place, bronze medalist(s)	Marrit Leenstra	39.02 (7)	1:16.56 (3)	39.00 (6)	1:15.64 (1)	154.120
4	Annette Gerritsen	38.52 (1)	1:17.03 (5)	38.60 (3)	1:16.99 (5)	154.130
5	Ireen Wüst	39.08 (8)	1:15.72 (1)	39.21 (9)	1:15.97 (2)	154.135
6	Laurine van Riessen	38.82 (4)	1:16.94 (4)	38.62 (4)	1:16.66 (4)	154.240
7	Anice Das	38.96 (6)	1:18.10 (9)	38.96 (5)	1:18.24 (12)	156.090
8	Floor van den Brandt	39.45 (10)	1:18.12 (10)	39.35 (10)	1:17.79 (8)	156.755
9	Janine Smit	39.55 (14)	1:18.42 (12)	39.09 (8)	1:17.98 (10)	156.840
10	Sophie Nijman	39.45 (10)	1:17.79 (8)	39.65 (12)	1:17.88 (9)	156.935
11	Lotte van Beek	39.30 (9)	1:18.21 (11)	39.58 (11)	1:18.15 (11)	157.060
12	Roxanne van Hemert	40.20 (19)	1:17.54 (7)	40.14 (19)	1:17.65 (7)	157.935
13	Rosa Pater	39.52 (13)	1:19.03 (15)	39.67 (13)	1:18.59 (14)	158.000
14	Mayon Kuipers	38.90 (5)	1:20.91 (20)	39.06 (7)	1:19.41 (15)	158.120
15	Letitia de Jong	39.91 (17)	1:18.87 (14)	39.68 (14)	1:18.42 (13)	158.235
16	Antoinette de Jong	39.85 (16)	1:18.57 (13)	39.89 (15)	1:19.71 (16)	158.880
17	Marit Dekker	39.50 (12)	1:19.72 (17)	39.96 (17)	1:20.59 (18)	159.615
18	Inge Bervoets	40.13 (18)	1:20.52 (19)	39.92 (16)	1:20.81 (19)	160.715
19	Myrthe Brommer	40.44 (20)	1:21.22 (21)	40.24 (20)	1:20.93 (20)	161.755
20	Miranda Dekker	40.87 (22)	1:20.19 (18)	40.76 (22)	1:20.53 (17)	161.990
21	Jorien Kranenborg	40.63 (21)	1:22.10 (22)	40.68 (21)	1:22.52 (21)	163.620
22	Bo van der Werff	39.74 (15)	1:19.60 (16)	40.05 (18)	–	119.590

Women's results: SchaatsStatistieken.nl
