= 2011 KNSB Dutch Single Distance Championships – Men's 500 m =

KNSB Dutch Single Distance Championships – Men's 500 m
- Venue: Thialf, Heerenveen
- Dates: 5–7 November 2010

The men's 500 m at the 2011 KNSB Dutch Single Distance Championships in Heerenveen took place at Thialf on Friday 5 November 2010. 24 athletes participated in the contest. The championship consisted of 2 times a 500 m. Every rider skated started once in the inner and once outer lane. Five speed skaters qualified for the 500 m at the 2010–11 ISU Speed Skating World Cup. Jan Smeekens was the title holder.

== Results ==
=== Draw 1st 500 m ===
Heat	Inner lane	Outer lane
1	Rigard van Klooster	Bernd Zweden
2	Lieuwe Mulder	Rob van Grinsven
3	Niels Olivier	Rienk Nauta
4	Jesper van Veen	Thomas Krol
5	Bas Bervoets	Sjoerd de Vries
6	Hein Otterspeer	Jacques de Koning
7	Jesper Hospes	Pim Schipper
8	Rens Boekhoff	Freddy Wennemars
9	Stefan Groothuis	Ronald Mulder
10	Jan Bos	Mark Tuitert
11	Michel Mulder	Simon Kuipers
12	Jan Smeekens	Lars Elgersma

Source: KNSB.nl Draw 1st 500 m

=== Results 1st 500 m ===
Rank	Athlete	Time	Dif.	Points
1	Ronald Mulder	35.12		35.120
2	Jan Smeekens	35.19	+ 0.07	35.190
3	Stefan Groothuis	35.38	+ 0.26	35.380
4	Jacques de Koning	35.49	+ 0.37	35.490
5	Hein Otterspeer	35.50	+ 0.38	35.50
6	Simon Kuipers	35.59	+ 0.47	35.590
7	Mark Tuitert	35.62	+ 0.50	35.620
8	Pim Schipper	35.83	+ 0.71	35.830
9	Lars Elgersma	35.86	+ 0.74	35.860
10	Michel Mulder	35.94	+ 0.82	35.940
11	Sjoerd de Vries	35.98	+ 0.86	35.980
12	Jesper Hospes	36.12	+ 1.00	36.120
13	Jan Bos	36.19	+ 1.07	36.190
14	Freddy Wennemars	36.37	+ 1.25	36.370
15	Thomas Krol	36.74	+ 1.62	36.740
16	Jesper van Veen	36.8	+ 1.68	36.800
17	Bas Bervoets	36.86	+ 1.74	36.860
18	Rigard van Klooster	36.95	+ 1.83	36.950
19	Rob van Grinsven	37.00	+ 1.88	37.000
20	Rienk Nauta	37.09	+ 1.97	37.090
21	Niels Olivier	37.18	+ 2.06	37.180
22	Lieuwe Mulder	37.29	+ 2.17	37.290
23	Bernd Zweden	37.42	+ 2.30	37.420
	Rens Boekhoff	DQ

Notes:
DQ = disqualified

Source: Schaatsupdate.nl

=== Draw 2nd 500 m ===
Heat	Inner lane	Outer lane
1	Bernd Zweden
2	Rienk Nauta
3	Rob van Grinsven	Niels Olivier
4	Thomas Krol	Rigard van Klooster
5	Freddy Wennemars	Bas Bervoets
6	Sjoerd de Vries	Jesper van Veen
7	Lars Elgersma	Jan Bos
8	Pim Schipper	Jesper Hospes
9	Mark Tuitert	Michel Mulder
10	Simon Kuipers	Hein Otterspeer
11	Jacques de Koning	Stefan Groothuis
12	Ronald Mulder	Jan Smeekens

Source: KNSB.nl Draw 2nd 500 m

=== Results 2nd 500 m ===
Rank	Athlete	Time	Dif.	Points
1	Ronald Mulder	35.11		35.110
2	Jan Smeekens	35.13	+ 0.02	35.130
3	Stefan Groothuis	35.56	+ 0.45	35.560
4	Mark Tuitert	35.64	+ 0.53	35.640
5	Jacques de Koning	35.70	+ 0.59	35.700
6	Jan Bos	35.74	+ 0.63	35.740
7	Hein Otterspeer	35.77	+ 0.66	35.770
8	Lars Elgersma	35.79	+ 0.68	35.790
9	Sjoerd de Vries	35.82	+ 0.71	35.820
10	Pim Schipper	35.89	+ 0.78	35.890
11	Freddy Wennemars	36.08	+ 0.97	36.080
12	Jesper Hospes	36.12	+ 1.01	36.120
13	Thomas Krol	36.60	+ 1.49	36.600
14	Bas Bervoets	36.71	+ 1.60	36.710
15	Jesper van Veen	36.73	+ 1.62	36.730
16	Rob van Grinsven	36.83	+ 1.72	36.830
17	Rienk Nauta	37.14	+ 2.03	37.140
18	Niels Olivier	37.15	+ 2.04	37.150
19	Rigard van Klooster	37.23	+ 2.12	37.230
20	Bernd Zweden	37.44	+ 2.33	37.440
	Simon Kuipers	DQ
	Michel Mulder	DNF

Notes:
DQ = disqualified
DNF = did not finish

Source: Schaatsupdate.nl

== Final results ==
Rank	Athlete	1st run	2nd run	Points
1st place, gold medalist(s)	Ronald Mulder	35.12	35.11	70.230
2nd place, silver medalist(s)	Jan Smeekens	35.19	35.12	70.310
3rd place, bronze medalist(s)	Stefan Groothuis	35.38	35.56	70.940
4	Jacques de Koning	35.49	35.70	71.190
5	Mark Tuitert	35.62	35.64	71.260
6	Hein Otterspeer	35.50	35.78	71.280
7	Lars Elgersma	35.86	35.79	71.650
8	Pim Schipper	35.83	35.89	71.720
9	Sjoerd de Vries	35.98	35.82	71.800
10	Jan Bos	36.19	35.74	71.930
11	Jesper Hospes	36.10	36.11	72.210
12	Freddy Wennemars	36.37	36.08	72.450
13	Thomas Krol	36.74	36.60	73.340
14	Jesper van Veen	36.80	36.73	73.530
15	Bas Bervoets	36.86	36.71	73.570
16	Rob van Grinsven	37.00	36.83	73.830
17	Rigard van Klooster	36.93	37.23	74.160
18	Rienk Nauta	37.09	37.14	74.230
19	Niels Olivier	37.18	37.15	74.330
20	Bernd Zweden	37.41	37.44	74.850
–	Simon Kuipers	35.59	DQ	35.590
–	Michel Mulder	35.94	DNF	35.940
–	Rens Boekhoff	DQ
–	Lieuwe Mulder	DQ

{{{1}}}
