= 2011 KNSB Dutch Single Distance Championships – Men's 1500 m =

Dutch speed skating competition

- Venue: Thialf, Heerenveen
- Dates: 7 November 2010
- Competitors: 24 skaters

Medalist men
1st place, gold medalist(s)		Simon Kuipers	NED
2nd place, silver medalist(s)		Mark Tuitert	NED
3rd place, bronze medalist(s)		Stefan Groothuis	NED

The men's 1500 meter at the 2011 KNSB Dutch Single Distance Championships took place in Heerenveen at the Thialf ice skating rink on Sunday 7 November 2010. Although this tournament was held in 2010 it was part of the speed skating season 2010–2011. There were 24 participants.

== Statistics ==
=== Result ===
Position	Skater	Time
1st place, gold medalist(s)	Simon Kuipers	1:44.81
2nd place, silver medalist(s)	Mark Tuitert	1:45.86
3rd place, bronze medalist(s)	Stefan Groothuis	1:46.31
4	Wouter Olde Heuvel	1:46.97
5	Rhian Ket	1:47.07
6	Koen Verweij	1:47.76
7	Remco Olde Heuvel	1:48.04
8	Renz Rotteveel	1:48.30
9	Jan Blokhuijsen	1:48.38
10	Tim Roelofsen	1:48.56
11	Ted-Jan Bloemen	1:48.93
12	Sjoerd de Vries	1:48.942
13	Hein Otterspeer	1:48.943
14	Maurice Vriend	1:49.18
15	Pim Schipper	1:49.19
16	Pim Cazemier	1:49.25
17	Bart van den Berg	1:49.41 PR
18	Frank Hermans	1:49.62
19	Thom van Beek	1:49.70
20	Boris Kusmirak	1:50.35
21	Lars Elgersma	1:50.49
22	Joep Pennartz	1:50.60 PR
23	Pepijn van der Vinne	1:51.64
24	Marco Bos	1:51.74

Referee: Jan Augustinus. Starter: Jan Zwier

Start: 12:56 hr. Finish: 13:36 hr.

=== Draw ===
Heat	Inside lane	Outside lane
1	Frank Hermans	Joep Pennartz
2	Lars Elgersma	Marco Bos
3	Pepijn van der Vinne	Thom van Beek
4	Boris Kusmirak	Hein Otterspeer
5	Maurice Vriend	Pim Cazemier
6	Renz Rotteveel	Sjoerd de Vries
7	Ted-Jan Bloemen	Pim Schipper
8	Tim Roelofsen	Bart van den Berg
9	Rhian Ket	Mark Tuitert
10	Remco Olde Heuvel	Stefan Groothuis
11	Koen Verweij	Wouter Olde Heuvel
12	Jan Blokhuijsen	Simon Kuipers
