= 2012 KNSB Dutch Single Distance Championships – Men's 1500 m =

Dutch speed skating competition

- Venue: Thialf, Heerenveen
- Dates: 6 November 2011
- Competitors: 24 skaters

Medalist men
1st place, gold medalist(s)		Stefan Groothuis	NED
2nd place, silver medalist(s)		Kjeld Nuis	NED
3rd place, bronze medalist(s)		Sjoerd de Vries	NED

The men's 1500 meter at the 2012 KNSB Dutch Single Distance Championships took place in Heerenveen at the Thialf ice skating rink on Sunday 6 November 2011. Although this tournament was held in 2011 it was part of the speed skating season 2011–2012. There were 24 participants.

== Statistics ==
=== Result ===
Position	Skater	Time
1st place, gold medalist(s)	Stefan Groothuis	1:46.26
2nd place, silver medalist(s)	Kjeld Nuis	1:46.88
3rd place, bronze medalist(s)	Sjoerd de Vries	1:46.89
4	Wouter Olde Heuvel	1:47.30
5	Mark Tuitert	1:47.342
6	Jan Blokhuijsen	1:47.343
7	Rhian Ket	1:47.62
8	Lars Elgersma	1:47.80
9	Maurice Vriend	1:48.01 PR
10	Koen Verweij	1:48.09
11	Pim Schipper	1:48.13
12	Renz Rotteveel	1:48.63
13	Simon Kuipers	1:48.89
14	Ben Jongejan	1:48.90
15	Thomas Krol	1:49.02 PR
16	Robbert de Rijk	1:49.20
17	Ted-Jan Bloemen	1:49.50
18	Thom van Beek	1:49.54 PR
19	Pim Cazemier	1:49.86
20	Karsten van Zeijl	1:50.09 PR
21	Lucas van Alphen	1:50.66
22	Frank Hermans	1:52.43
23	Wietse van der Heide	1:53.56
24	Rens Boekhoff	1:54.47

=== Draw ===
Heat	Inside lane	Outside lane
1	Lucas van Alphen	Rens Boekhoff
2	Lars Elgersma	Wietse van der Heide
3	Karsten van Zeijl	Thom van Beek
4	Robbert de Rijk	Thomas Krol
5	Maurice Vriend	Pim Cazemier
6	Ted-Jan Bloemen	Ben Jongejan
7	Sjoerd de Vries	Pim Schipper
8	Frank Hermans	Koen Verweij
9	Simon Kuipers	Mark Tuitert
10	Stefan Groothuis	Kjeld Nuis
11	Wouter Olde Heuvel	Renz Rotteveel
12	Rhian Ket	Jan Blokhuijsen
