= 2014 KNSB Dutch Single Distance Championships – Men's 500 m =

Dutch speed skating competition

- Venue: Thialf, Heerenveen
- Dates: 25 October 2013
- Competitors: 24

Medalist men
1st place, gold medalist(s)		Jan Smeekens	NED
2nd place, silver medalist(s)		Ronald Mulder	NED
3rd place, bronze medalist(s)		Michel Mulder	NED

The men's 500 meter at the 2014 KNSB Dutch Single Distance Championships took place in Heerenveen at the Thialf ice skating rink on Friday 25 October 2013. It consisted of twice 500 meter where the speed skaters started once in the inner and once in the outer lane. Although this tournament was held in 2013 it was part of the speed skating season 2013–2014. There were 24 participants.

== Statistics ==
=== Result ===
Position	Skater	Time 1st 500m	Time 2nd 500m	Total points Samalog
1st place, gold medalist(s)	Jan Smeekens	34.98 (2)	34.92 (1)	69.900
2nd place, silver medalist(s)	Ronald Mulder	34.90 (1)	35.06 (3)	69.960
3rd place, bronze medalist(s)	Michel Mulder	35.10 (3)	34.92 (1)	70.020
4	Jesper Hospes	35.28 (4)	35.12 (4)	70.400
5	Kjeld Nuis	35.45 (5)	35.18 (5)	70.630
6	Stefan Groothuis	35.64 (7)	35.33 (6)	70.970
7	Pim Schipper	35.67 (8)	35.34 (7)	71.010
8	Lennart Velema	35.70 (10)	35.60 (8)	71.300
9	Hein Otterspeer	35.70 (9)	35.63 (9)	71.330
10	Mark Tuitert	35.57 (6)	35.80 (12)	71.370
11	Gerben Jorritsma	35.88 (12)	35.66 (10)	71.540
12	Jacques de Koning	35.88 (11)	35.86 (14)	71.740
13	Aron Romeijn	35.90 (13)	35.96 (15)	71.860
14	Thomas Krol	36.10 (15)	35.78 (11)	71.880
15	Kai Verbij	35.91 (14)	36.14 (16)	72.050
16	Sjoerd de Vries	37.13 (21)	35.81 (13)	72.940
17	Joost Born	36.64 (17)	36.33 (18)	72.970
18	Dai Dai N'tab	36.52 (16)	36.56 (19)	73.080
19	Lucas van Alphen	36.67 (18)	36.63 (20)	73.300
20	Gijs Esders	36.68 (19)	36.89 (22)	73.570
21	Jeljer Haarsma	37.08 (20)	36.97 (23) PR	74.050 PR
22	Martijn van Oosten	37.20 (22)	36.88 (21)	74.080
23	Lieuwe Mulder	39.25 (23)	36.31 (17) PR	75.560
NC	Allard Neijmeijer	1.07.70 (24)	DNS	

=== Draw 1st 500 meter ===
Heat	Inside lane	Outside lane
1	Martijn van Oosten	Gerben Jorritsma
2	Lieuwe Mulder	Aron Romeijn
3	Jeljer Haarsma	Dai Dai N'tab
4	Joost Born	Gijs Esders
5	Pim Schipper	Thomas Krol
6	Jacques de Koning	Kai Verbij
7	Sjoerd de Vries	Lennart Velema
8	Allard Neijmeijer	Lucas van Alphen
9	Jan Smeekens	Stefan Groothuis
10	Mark Tuitert	Ronald Mulder
11	Michel Mulder	Hein Otterspeer
12	Kjeld Nuis	Jesper Hospes

=== Draw 2nd 500 meter ===
Heat	Inside lane	Outside lane
1	Gijs Esders	
2	Lucas van Alphen	Lieuwe Mulder
3	Dai Dai N'tab	Martijn van Oosten
4	Thomas Krol	Sjoerd de Vries
5	Kai Verbij	Jeljer Haarsma
6	Aron Romeijn	Joost Born
7	Gerben Jorritsma	Jacques de Koning
8	Lennart Velema	Pim Schipper
9	Hein Otterspeer	Mark Tuitert
10	Stefan Groothuis	Kjeld Nuis
11	Jesper Hospes	Michel Mulder
12	Ronald Mulder	Jan Smeekens
