= 2012 KNSB Dutch Single Distance Championships – Women's 3000 m =

- Venue: Thialf, Heerenveen, Netherlands
- Date: 5 November 2011
- Competitors: 20 skaters

Medalist men
| 1st place, gold medalist(s) | | Pien Keulstra | NED |
| 2nd place, silver medalist(s) | | Diane Valkenburg | NED |
| 3rd place, bronze medalist(s) | | Ireen Wüst | NED |

The women's 3000 meter at the 2012 KNSB Dutch Single Distance Championships took place in Heerenveen at the Thialf ice skating rink on Saturday 5 November 2011. Although this tournament was held in 2011, it was part of the 2011–2012 speed skating season.

There were 20 participants.

Title holder was Ireen Wüst.

The first 5 skaters qualified for the next following 2011–12 ISU Speed Skating World Cup tournaments.

== Overview ==
=== Result ===
| Rank | Skater | Time |
|---|---|---|
| 1st place, gold medalist(s) | Pien Keulstra | 4:09.75 PR |
| 2nd place, silver medalist(s) | Diane Valkenburg | 4:10.37 |
| 3rd place, bronze medalist(s) | Ireen Wüst | 4:10.58 |
| 4 | Linda de Vries | 4:11.11 |
| 5 | Janneke Ensing | 4:12.39 PR |
| 6 | Carlijn Achtereekte | 4:13.11 PR |
| 7 | Annouk van der Weijden | 4:13.47 |
| 8 | Jorien ter Mors | 4:13.75 PR |
| 9 | Marrit Leenstra | 4:13.96 |
| 10 | Marije Joling | 4:14.14 |
| 11 | Rixt Meijer | 4:15.22 PR |
| 12 | Jorien Voorhuis | 4:15.51 |
| 13 | Paulien van Deutekom | 4:15.78 |
| 14 | Wieteke Cramer | 4:15.98 |
| 15 | Yvonne Nauta | 4:16.58 |
| 16 | Mariska Huisman | 4:18.75 PR |
| 17 | Miranda Dekker | 4:21.10 PR |
| 18 | Reina Anema | 4:22.01 |
| 19 | Moniek Kleinsman | 4:28.20 |
| 20 | Lotte van Beek | 4:29.08 |

=== Draw ===
| Heat | Inner lane | Outer lane |
|---|---|---|
| 1 | Miranda Dekker | Janneke Ensing |
| 2 | Lotte van Beek | Rixt Meijer |
| 3 | Jorien ter Mors | Wieteke Cramer |
| 4 | Reina Anema | Mariska Huisman |
| 5 | Moniek Kleinsman | Annouk van der Weijden |
| 6 | Paulien van Deutekom | Carlijn Achtereekte |
| 7 | Linda de Vries | Yvonne Nauta |
| 8 | Marije Joling | Pien Keulstra |
| 9 | Ireen Wüst | Diane Valkenburg |
| 10 | Jorien Voorhuis | Marrit Leenstra |
