= 2012 KNSB Dutch Single Distance Championships – Women's 5000 m =

- Venue: Thialf, Heerenveen, Netherlands
- Date: 6 November 2011
- Competitors: 10 skaters

Medalist men
1st place, gold medalist(s)		Pien Keulstra	NED
2nd place, silver medalist(s)		Carlijn Achtereekte	NED
3rd place, bronze medalist(s)		Annouk van der Weijden	NED

The women's 5000 meter at the 2012 KNSB Dutch Single Distance Championships took place in Heerenveen at the Thialf ice skating rink on Sunday 6 November 2011. Although this tournament was held in 2011, it was part of the 2011–2012 speed skating season.

There were 10 participants. There was a qualification selection incentive for the next following 2011–12 ISU Speed Skating World Cup tournaments.

Title holder was Moniek Kleinsman.

== Overview ==
=== Result ===
Rank	Skater	Time
1st place, gold medalist(s)	Pien Keulstra	7:12.55 PR
2nd place, silver medalist(s)	Carlijn Achtereekte	7:15.31
3rd place, bronze medalist(s)	Annouk van der Weijden	7:15.89
4	Janneke Ensing	7:16.90 PR
5	Linda de Vries	7:18.73
6	Rixt Meijer	7:21.54 PR
7	Yvonne Nauta	7:22.11
8	Jorien Voorhuis	7:24.07
9	Marije Joling	7:26.58
10	Moniek Kleinsman	7:31.98

=== Draw ===
Heat	Inner lane	Outer lane
1	Pien Keulstra	Janneke Ensing
2	Annouk van der Weijden	Yvonne Nauta
3	Marije Joling	Linda de Vries
4	Rixt Meijer	Carlijn Achtereekte
5	Jorien Voorhuis	Moniek Kleinsman
