= 2012 KNSB Dutch Single Distance Championships – Women's 1500 m =

- Venue: Thialf, Heerenveen, Netherlands
- Date: 6 November 2011
- Competitors: 22 skaters

Medalist men
1st place, gold medalist(s)		Ireen Wüst	NED
2nd place, silver medalist(s)		Marrit Leenstra	NED
3rd place, bronze medalist(s)		Diane Valkenburg	NED

The women's 1500 meter at the 2012 KNSB Dutch Single Distance Championships took place in Heerenveen at the Thialf ice skating rink on Sunday 6 November 2011. Although this tournament was held in 2011, it was part of the 2011–2012 speed skating season.

There were 22 participants.

Title holder was Ireen Wüst.

There was a qualification selection incentive for the next following 2011–12 ISU Speed Skating World Cup tournaments.

== Overview ==
=== Result ===
Rank	Skater	Time
1st place, gold medalist(s)	Ireen Wüst	1:57.77
2nd place, silver medalist(s)	Marrit Leenstra	1:57.91
3rd place, bronze medalist(s)	Diane Valkenburg	1:59.31
4	Margot Boer	1:59.33
5	Linda de Vries	1:59.58
6	Annouk van der Weijden	1:59.82
7	Lotte van Beek	2:00.17
8	Annette Gerritsen	2:00.21
9	Jorien Voorhuis	2:00.33
10	Pien Keulstra	2:00.58 PR
11	Marije Joling	2:00.60
12	Laurine van Riessen	2:00.66
13	Antoinette de Jong	2:00.73 PR
14	Roxanne van Hemert	2:00.97
15	Paulien van Deutekom	2:01.17
16	Yvonne Nauta	2:01.81
17	Janneke Ensing	2:01.90
18	Reina Anema	2:02.36 PR
19	Thijsje Oenema	2:02.48
20	Lisette van der Geest	2:02.96
21	Miranda Dekker	2:03.06
22	Ingeborg Kroon	2:03.31

=== Draw ===
Heat	Inner lane	Outer lane
1	Miranda Dekker	Thijsje Oenema
2	Reina Anema	Antoinette de Jong
3	Pien Keulstra	Janneke Ensing
4	Annette Gerritsen	Marije Joling
5	Paulien van Deutekom	Yvonne Nauta
6	Lotte van Beek	Roxanne van Hemert
7	Annouk van der Weijden	Lisette van der Geest
8	Ireen Wüst	Margot Boer
9	Ingeborg Kroon	Linda de Vries
10	Diane Valkenburg	Marrit Leenstra
11	Jorien Voorhuis	Laurine van Riessen
