= 2011 World Single Distance Speed Skating Championships – Men's 1500 metres =

The men's 1500 m race of the 2011 World Single Distance Speed Skating Championships was held on 10 March at 15:30 local time.

== Results ==
Rank	Pair	Lane	Name	Country	Time	Time behind	Notes
1st place, gold medalist(s)	12	o	Håvard Bøkko	Norway	1:45.04		
2nd place, silver medalist(s)	12	i	Shani Davis	United States	1:45.09	+0.05	
3rd place, bronze medalist(s)	7	i	Lucas Makowsky	Canada	1:45.22	+0.18	
4	11	i	Stefan Groothuis	Netherlands	1:45.51	+0.47	
5	11	o	Ivan Skobrev	Russia	1:45.58	+0.54	
6	10	o	Denny Morrison	Canada	1:45.66	+0.62	
7	9	o	Trevor Marsicano	United States	1:45.74	+0.70	
8	6	o	Mathieu Giroux	Canada	1:45.92	+0.88	
9	8	i	Jonathan Kuck	United States	1:46.26	+1.22	
10	8	o	Alexis Contin	France	1:46.47	+1.43	
11	10	i	Simon Kuipers	Netherlands	1:46.83	+1.79	
12	5	o	Konrad Niedźwiedzki	Poland	1:47.22	+2.18	
13	6	i	Yevgeny Lalenkov	Russia	1:47.26	+2.22	
14	3	i	Aleksandr Zhigin	Kazakhstan	1:47.40	+2.36	
15	4	i	Sverre Lunde Pedersen	Norway	1:47.64	+2.60	
16	3	o	Robert Lehmann	Germany	1:47.73	+2.69	
17	7	o	Mikael Flygind Larsen	Norway	1:47.89	+2.85	
18	4	o	Joel Eriksson	Sweden	1:48.32	+3.28	
19	5	i	Zbigniew Bródka	Poland	1:48.72	+3.68	
20	2	o	Pavel Baynov	Russia	1:49.17	+4.13	
21	1	o	Matteo Anesi	Italy	1:50.21	+5.17	
22	1	i	Shane Dobbin	New Zealand	1:50.58	+5.54	
23	2	i	Jörg Dallmann	Germany	1:50.62	+5.58	
	9	i	Mark Tuitert	Netherlands	DQ		
