= Jan Smeekens =

Dutch speed skater

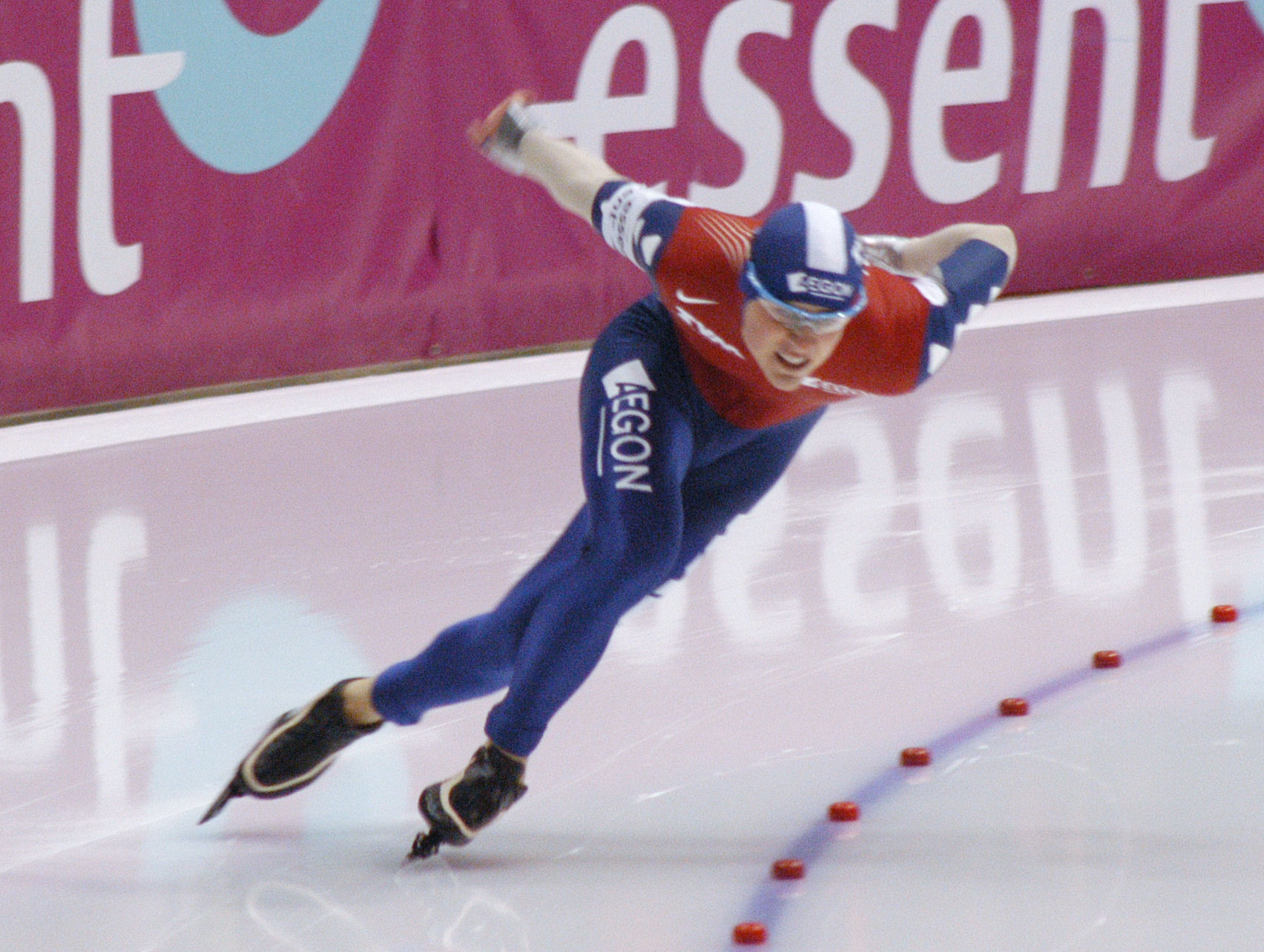
- Jan Smeekens

Personal information
- Born: 11 February 1987 (age 39) Raalte, Netherlands
- Height: 1.77 m (5 ft 10 in)
- Weight: 72 kg (159 lb)

Sport
- Country: Netherlands
- Sport: Speed skating
- Turned pro: 2001
- Retired: 2020
Medal record
Men's speed skating
Representing Netherlands
Olympic Games
Silver medal – second place	2014 Sochi	500 m
World Single Distance Championships
Gold medal – first place	2017 Gangneung	500 m
Bronze medal – third place	2011 Inzell	500 m
Bronze medal – third place	2013 Sochi	500 m

Jan Smeekens (born 11 February 1987) is a Dutch former speed skater. He is a 500 m specialist.

Smeekens won his first international medal during the 2004 World Junior Single Distance Championships in Moscow where he won the gold medal at the 500 m. At the 2006 KNSB Dutch Single Distance Championships on 28 October 2005 he made his début among the senior skaters in his country, resulting in claiming a World Cup spot for races in Collalbo and Baselga di Pinè. In the A-group of these World Cup meetings he finished in 6th and 7th position.

On 7 January 2006, later during the 2005–06 season he also made his début at the 2006 KNSB Dutch Sprint Championships. At these championships he won the second race over 500 m. In February 2006 Smeekens signed a professional contract with the TVM Speed skating team.

His first success in his new team was winning a silver medal on the 500 m at the 2007 KNSB Dutch Single Distance Championships. He won the first race beating all the favourites, while finishing second behind Jan Bos in the final race. Bos claimed and defended his title.

In 2006 Smeekens became the Dutch junior record holder in the 500 m with a personal best of 35.16, which he achieved during the 2006 speed skating finals in Calgary.

At the 2010 Winter Olympics in Vancouver, Smeekens finished sixth in the 500 m race.

He won Silver in the Men's 500 metres Speed Skating event at the 2014 Winter Olympics in Sochi, Russia; he had thought he won gold in that event, but his time was adjusted.

At the 2018 Winter Olympics in Pyeongchang, Smeekens finished tenth in the 500 m race.

== Records ==
=== Personal records ===
Personal records
Men's speed skating
Event	Result	Date	Location	Notes
100 meter	9.69	14 February 2009	Enschede	Dutch national record
300 meter	22.78	14 February 2009	Enschede	World record
500 meter	34.32	19 January 2013	Calgary	
1000 meter	1:08.89	16 March 2007	Calgary	
1500 meter	1:48.44	15 March 2007	Calgary	
3000 meter	4:05.18	21 January 2006	Erfurt	
5000 meter	7:23.36	5 February 2005	Assen	

Source: SpeedskatingResults.com

=== World records ===
Event	Result	Date	Location	Avg. speed
300 m	22.78	14 February 2009	Enschede	47.4 km/h

== Tournament overview ==
Season	Dutch Championships Single Distances	Dutch Championships Sprint	World Championships Sprint	World Championships Single Distances	Olympic Games	World Cup	European Championships Single Distances
2004–05	ASSEN 10th 500m						
2005–06	HEERENVEEN 7th 500m 14th 1000m	ASSEN 4th 500m 16th 1000m (gold) 500m 18th 1000m 10th overall				25th 500m	
2006–07	ASSEN (silver) 500m 25th 1000m	GRONINGEN (bronze) 500m 15th 1000m (gold) 500m 14th 1000m 7th overall		SALT LAKE CITY 13th 500m		12th 500m	
2007–08	HEERENVEEN (gold) 500m	HEERENVEEN 6th 500m DNF 1000m DNS 500m DNS 1000m NC overall		NAGANO 16th 500m		11th 500m	
2008–09	HEERENVEEN (gold) 500m	GRONINGEN (silver) 500m 17th 1000m (gold) 500m 17th 1000m 10th overall		VANCOUVER 13th 500m		11th 500m	
2009–10	HEERENVEEN (gold) 500m 16th 1000m	GRONINGEN (gold) 500m 8th 1000m (gold) 500m 10th 1000m 4th overall			VANCOUVER 6th 500m	(silver) 500m	
2010–11	HEERENVEEN (silver) 500m 12th 1000m	HEERENVEEN (gold) 500m 4th 1000m (gold) 500m 8th 1000m (silver) overall	HEERENVEEN 14th 500m 22nd 1000m (silver) 500m 15th 1000m 13th overall	INZELL (bronze) 500m		5th 500m	
2011–12	HEERENVEEN (gold) 500m 14th 1000m	HEERENVEEN 4th 500m 18th 1000m (bronze) 500m 12th 1000m 7th overall		HEERENVEEN 14th 500m		4th 500m	
2012–13	HEERENVEEN (silver) 500m	GRONINGEN (silver) 500m 11th 1000m (silver) 500m 14th 1000m 7th overall		SOCHI (bronze) 500m		(gold) 500m	
2013–14	HEERENVEEN (gold) 500m	AMSTERDAM (silver) 500m 10th 1000m (silver) 500m 13th 1000m 5th overall			SOCHI (silver) 500m	(bronze) 500m	
2014–15	HEERENVEEN (gold) 500m	GRONINGEN 6th 500m 21st 1000m 4th 500m 21st 1000m 15th overall				8th 500m	
2015–16	HEERENVEEN (silver) 500m	HEERENVEEN (bronze) 500m 13th 1000m (silver) 500m 15th 1000m 9th overall		KOLOMNA 15th 500m		21st 500m	
2016–17	HEERENVEEN (bronze) 500m 14th 1000m	HEERENVEEN (gold) 500m 8th 1000m (gold) 500m 9th 1000m (silver) overall		GANGNEUNG (gold) 500m		5th 500m 63rd 1000m	
2017–18	HEERENVEEN 5th 500m 13th 1000m				GANGNEUNG 10th 500m	4th 500m	
2018–19	HEERENVEEN (bronze) 500m 19th 1000m	HEERENVEEN (silver) 500m 17th 1000m DNS 500m DNS 1000m NC overall		INZELL 10th 500m		17th 500m	
2019–20	HEERENVEEN (silver) 500m			SALT LAKE CITY 12th 500m		39th 500m	HEERENVEEN 5th 500m

- DNF = Did not finish
- DNS = Did not start
- NC = No classification

== World Cup ==
Season	500 meter													
2005–2006	–	–	7th(b)	10th(b)	–	–	9th	10th	19th	19th	16th	13th		
2006–2007	6th	13th	7th	12th	13th	13th	15th	16th	7th	9th	19th	8th		
2007–2008	23rd	12th	11th	14th	12th	10th	13th	4th	11th	8th	15th	10th	10th	8th
2008–2009	17th	12th	13th	5th	14th	15th	14th	15th	14th	15th	6th	3rd place, bronze medalist(s)	11th	
2009–2010	8th	10th	5th	2nd place, silver medalist(s)	14th	9th	–	–	1st place, gold medalist(s)	1st place, gold medalist(s)	1st place, gold medalist(s)	1st place, gold medalist(s)		
2010–2011	4th	9th	2nd place, silver medalist(s)	9th	10th	2nd place, silver medalist(s)	–	–	6th	1st place, gold medalist(s)	4th	6th		
2011–2012	2nd place, silver medalist(s)	5th	14th	1st place, gold medalist(s)	15th	5th	2nd place, silver medalist(s)	6th	14th	11th	6th	3rd place, bronze medalist(s)		
2012–2013	3rd place, bronze medalist(s)	2nd place, silver medalist(s)	7th	3rd place, bronze medalist(s)	1st place, gold medalist(s)	3rd place, bronze medalist(s)	1st place, gold medalist(s)	1st place, gold medalist(s)	1st place, gold medalist(s)	1st place, gold medalist(s)	1st place, gold medalist(s)	1st place, gold medalist(s)		
2013–2014	7th	7th	6th	16th	4th	10th	–	–	4th	1st place, gold medalist(s)	2nd place, silver medalist(s)	1st place, gold medalist(s)		
2014–2015	1st place, gold medalist(s)	2nd place, silver medalist(s)	10th	4th	14th	6th	16th	3rd place, bronze medalist(s)	17th	–	15th	7th		
2015–2016	–	3rd(b)	6th	–	13th	7th	8th	10th(b)						
2016–2017	4th	15th	2nd place, silver medalist(s)	–	–	8th	3rd place, bronze medalist(s)	–	4th	3rd place, bronze medalist(s)				
2017–2018	1st(b)	2nd place, silver medalist(s)	8th	17th	17th	–	–	–	2nd place, silver medalist(s)	2nd place, silver medalist(s)	1st place, gold medalist(s)			
2018–2019	7th	15th	3rd place, bronze medalist(s)	5th	–	–	18th	12th	4th	–	–			
2019–2020	–	–	–	–	–	17th	–	–						

== Medals won ==
Championship	Gold (gold)	Silver (silver)	Bronze (bronze)
Dutch Single Distances	6	5	2
Dutch Sprint Classification	0	2	0
Dutch Sprint Single Distances	9	7	3
World Sprint Classification	0	0	0
World Sprint Single Distances	0	1	0
World Cup 500m	16	12	9
World Cup Classification	1	1	1
World Single Distances	1	0	2
Olympic Games	0	1	0
