= Mark Tuitert =

Dutch speed skater

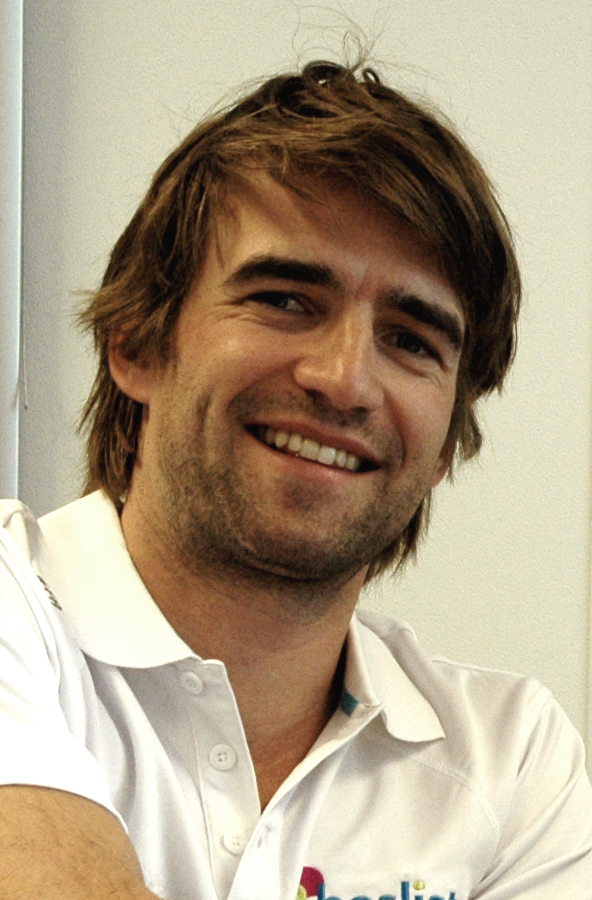
- Tuitert in 2012

Personal information
- Born: 4 April 1980 (age 46) Holten, Netherlands
- Height: 180 cm (5 ft 11 in)
- Weight: 84 kg (185 lb)
- Website: marktuitert.nl

Sport
- Country: Netherlands
- Sport: Speed skating
- Turned pro: 1998
- Retired: 2014
Medal record
Men's speed skating
Representing the Netherlands
Olympic Games
Gold medal – first place	2010 Vancouver	1500 m
Bronze medal – third place	2006 Turin	Team pursuit
Bronze medal – third place	2010 Vancouver	Team pursuit
World Championships
Gold medal – first place	2005 Inzell	Team pursuit
Silver medal – second place	2004 Seoul	1500 m
Silver medal – second place	2005 Inzell	1500 m
European Championships
Gold medal – first place	2004 Heerenveen	All round
Bronze medal – third place	2003 Heerenveen	All round
World Junior Championships
Gold medal – first place	1999 Geithus	Allround
Silver medal – second place	1998 Roseville	Allround

Mark Jan Hendrik Tuitert (Dutch pronunciation: [ˈmɑr(ə)k ˈtœytərt]; born 4 April 1980) is a retired Dutch speed skater. He won gold at the 1500 m at the 2010 Winter Olympics.

== Personal life ==
Tuitert married fellow Dutch speed skater Helen van Goozen in 2009. Ten years before, they both won gold medals at the World Junior Speed Skating Championships.

== Speed skating career ==
=== 2006 Olympic Games in Turin ===
Tuitert participated in the team pursuit event at the 2006 Winter Olympics, with teammates Sven Kramer, Carl Verheijen, Erben Wennemars and Rintje Ritsma. The Dutch team was a favourite and was leading Italy by nearly a full second in their semifinal matchup, but Sven Kramer stepped on a block and fell, taking Carl Verheijen with him. In the race for bronze they defeated Norway, giving Tuitert his first Olympic medal.

=== 2010 Olympic Games in Vancouver ===
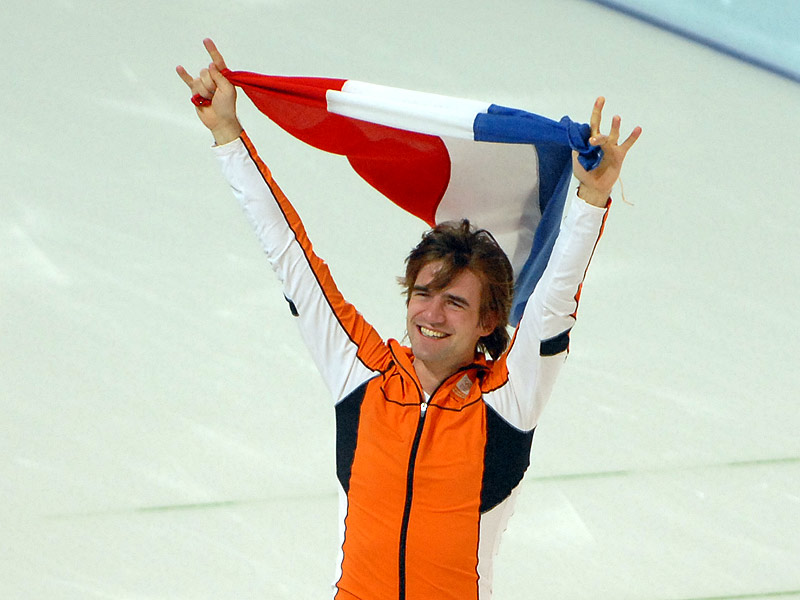
Tuitert after winning the 1500m at the 2010 Winter Olympics

At the 2010 Winter Olympics in Vancouver, British Columbia he won the gold medal in the 1500 m. In the 17th pair against Håvard Bøkko he set a new track record time (1:45.57), which had been in the hands of Shani Davis (1:46.19). In the last heat, Davis failed by 0.13 seconds to improve on Tuitert's time and finished second.

Until then, the only other Dutch Olympic gold medal winners in the 1500 meters speed skating were Kees Verkerk at the 1968 Winter Olympics and Ard Schenk at the 1972 Winter Olympics.

=== 2014 Olympic Games in Sochi ===
At the 2014 Winter Olympics in Sochi Tuitert finished 10th in the 1000 m and 5th in the 1500 m.

=== Other ===
Tuitert highest ranking on the adelskalender. was the 6th position between 30 December 2000 and 2 March 2001.

=== Life after skating ===
After his speed skating career Tuitert co-founded First Energy Gum, a company which produces caffeinated Energy Gum for athletes. Tuitert is also a pundit in speed skating for Dutch broadcaster NOS and an online fitness coach for FitChannel.com. Further, he has a podcast called "Drive", in which he interviews a large variety of professionals (i.e. athletes, scientists, entrepreneurs) with a drive. In 2021 his book " Drive: train your stoic mindset" was published in the Netherlands (Drive: train je stoicijnse mindset).

== Records ==
=== World records ===
Event	Result	Date	Location	Notes
1500 meter	1:48.45	20 March 1999	Calgary	Junior world record until 17 March 2001
3000 meter	3:48.56	19 March 1999	Calgary	Junior world record until 21 March 2002
5000 meter	6:33.26	20 March 1999	Calgary	Junior world record until 3 March 2001
Big combination classification	151.691	11 January 2004	Heerenveen	World record until 8 February 2004
Team pursuit**	3:46.44	21 November 2004	Berlin	World record until 12 November 2005

- ** Together with Carl Verheijen and Erben Wennemars

=== Personal records ===
To put his personal records in perspective, the column Notes lists the official world records on the dates that Tuitert skated his personal records.

Personal records
Men's speed skating
Event	Result	Date	Location	Notes
500 meter	35.20	27 December 2009	Heerenveen	WR 34.03
1000 meter	1:07.84	11 November 2007	Salt Lake City	WR 1:07.00
1500 meter	1:42.87	17 December 2007	Salt Lake City	WR 1:42.32
3000 meter	3.41.16	12 August 2005	Salt Lake City	WR 3:39.02
5000 meter	6:27.63	9 January 2004	Heerenveen	WR 6:14.66
10000 meter	13:38.91	11 January 2004	Heerenveen	WR 12:58.92
Big combination	151.536	8 February 2004	Hamar	WR 151.691

Source: marktuitert.nl

Tuitert has a score of 149.198 points on the Adelskalender

== Tournament overview ==
Season	Dutch Championships Allround	European Championships Allround	World Championships Allround	Dutch Championships Sprint	World Championships Sprint	Dutch Championships Single Distances	World Championships Single Distances	Olympic Games	World Cup GWC	World Championships Juniors
1997–98										ROSEVILLE (bronze) 500m 4th 3000m (gold) 1500m (gold) 5000m (silver) overall
1998–99	THE HAGUE 13th 500m 6th 1500m (bronze) 5000m 4th 10000m 4th overall									GIETHUS (silver) 500m (gold) 3000m 4th 1500m (bronze) 5000m (gold) overall
1999–00	THE HAGUE 6th 500m 8th 5000m 6th 1500m 6th 10000m 6th overall					DEVENTER 5th 1500m 5th 5000m 6th 10000m				
2000–01	HEERENVEEN 7th 500m 9th 5000m (gold) 1500m 5th 10000m (bronze) overall	BASELGA di PINÈ (silver) 500m (silver) 5000m DNF 1500m DNQ 10000m NC overall				THE HAGUE 4th 1000m (silver) 1500m 9th 5000m			18th 1500m	
2001–02						GRONINGEN DNF 1000m 13th 1500m 18th 5000m				
2002–03	ASSEN (gold) 500m 4th 5000m 6th 1500m 7th 10000m (silver) overall	HEERENVEEN (silver) 500m 6th 5000m (bronze) 1500m 7th 10000m (bronze) overall	GOTHENBURG 7th 500m 8th 5000m (silver) 1500m 4th 10000m 4th overall			UTRECHT (bronze) 1500m 10th 5000m			5th 1500m	
2003–04	EINDHOVEN (gold) 500m 11th 5000m (gold) 1500m 6th 10000m (bronze) overall	HEERENVEEN (silver) 500m (silver) 5000m (gold) 1500m 5th 10000m (gold) overall	HAMAR (silver) 500m 7th 5000m (silver) 1500m 7th 10000m 5th overall			HEERENVEEN 6th 1000m (silver) 1500m 4th 5000m	SEOUL (silver) 1500m		(gold) 1500m 17th 5000/10000m	
2004–05	HEERENVEEN (gold) 500m 7th 5000m (silver) 1500m 6th 10000m (bronze) overall	HEERENVEEN (gold) 500m 7th 5000m (silver) 1500m 10th 10000m 4th overall				ASSEN 4th 1000m 6th 1500m 12th 5000m	INZELL (silver) 1500m (gold) Team pursuit		(gold) 1500m	
2005–06	UTRECHT (gold) 500m 4th 5000m (silver) 1500m 4th 10000m (gold) overall			ASSEN 8th 500m 5th 1000m 6th 500m (bronze) 1000m 5th overall		HEERENVEEN 5th 1000m 6th 1500m		TURIN (bronze) Team pursuit	20th 1500m	
2006–07	HEERENVEEN (silver) 500m 7th 5000m (bronze) 1500m 7th 10000m 4th overall	COLLALBO 4th 500m 11th 5000m (bronze) 1500m 11th 10000m 8th overall				ASSEN 5th 1000m DNF 1500m 5th 5000m			11th 1500m 34th 5000/10000m	
2007–08				HEERENVEEN 8th 500m 4th 1000m 10th 500m 5th 1000m 7th overall		HEERENVEEN 4th 1000m 4th 1500m	NAGANO DNF 1000m 6th 1500m		8th 1000m (bronze) 1500m (silver) Team pursuit	
2008–09				GRONINGEN 10th 500m (bronze) 1000m (bronze) 500m (silver) 1000m (bronze) overall	MOSCOW 13th 500m 6th 1000m 17th 500m 9th 1000m 9th overall	HEERENVEEN (bronze) 500m (bronze) 1000m (silver) 1500m	VANCOUVER 9th 1500m		25th 100m 17th 500m 7th 1000m 5th 1500m 7th Team pursuit	
2009–10				GRONINGEN 6th 500m (bronze) 1000m 5th 500m (silver) 1000m (silver) overall		HEERENVEEN (bronze) 500m (bronze) 1000m (silver) 1500m		VANCOUVER 5th 1000m (gold) 1500m (bronze) Team pursuit	34th 500m (silver) 1000m 4th 1500m	
2010–11						HEERENVEEN 5th 500m DSQ 1000m (silver) 1500m	INZELL DSQ 1500m		21st 1000m 7th 1500m	
2011–12				HEERENVEEN 11th 500m 8th 1000m 11th 500m 5th 1000m 8th overall		HEERENVEEN 8th 500m 6th 1000m 5th 1500m			31st 500m 7th 1500m	
2012–13				GRONINGEN 8th 500m 4th 1000m 6th 500m (gold) 1000m 4th overall	SALT LAKE CITY DNF 500m DNF 1000m DNQ 500m DNQ 1000m NC overall		SOCHI DNF 1000m 7th 1500m		12th 1000m 15th 1500m	
2013–14				AMSTERDAM 12th 500m 7th 1000m 7th 500m 5th 1000m 7th overall		HEERENVEEN 10th 500m 11th 1000m 4th 1500m		SOCHI 10th 1000m 5th 1500m	NC 500; 14th 1000m 8th 1500m	

== World Cup overview ==
Season	500 meter												
2000–2001													
2001–2002													
2002–2003													
2003–2004													
2004–2005													
2005–2006													
2006–2007													
2007–2008													
2008–2009	11th	15th	DSQ	15th	10th	11th	–	–	11th	13th	15th	15th	22nd
2009–2010	18th	18th	DSQ(b)	10th(b)	–	–	–	–	13th	14th	–	–	
2010–2011													
2011–2012													
2012–2013													

Season	1000 meter									
2000–2001										
2001–2002										
2002–2003										
2003–2004										
2004–2005										
2005–2006										
2006–2007										
2007–2008	28th	10th	7th	7th	6th	16th	–	6th	5th	7th
2008–2009	9th	11th	4th	5th	–	–	10th	3rd place, bronze medalist(s)	17th	16th
2009–2010	4th	4th	5th	–	2nd place, silver medalist(s)	3rd place, bronze medalist(s)	3rd place, bronze medalist(s)			
2010–2011	5th	6th	–	–	–	–	–	–		
2011–2012	–	–	1st(b)	–	–	–	–			
2012–2013	–	–	–	–	–	11th	1st(b)	6th	2nd place, silver medalist(s)	

Season	1500 meter						
2000–2001	6th	7th	–	–			
2001–2002							
2002–2003	4th	10th	–	10th	2nd place, silver medalist(s)	6th	
2003–2004	2nd place, silver medalist(s)	1st place, gold medalist(s)	2nd place, silver medalist(s)	1st place, gold medalist(s)	1st place, gold medalist(s)		
2004–2005	1st place, gold medalist(s)	2nd place, silver medalist(s)	8th	6th	1st place, gold medalist(s)		
2005–2006	DNF	1st(b)	10th	DNF	–		
2006–2007	–	–	–	2nd(b)	3rd place, bronze medalist(s)	6th	
2007–2008	10th	3rd place, bronze medalist(s)	5th	3rd place, bronze medalist(s)	5th	3rd place, bronze medalist(s)	5th
2008–2009	4th	3rd place, bronze medalist(s)	2nd place, silver medalist(s)	19th	8th	7th	
2009–2010	5th	4th	6th	6th	–	4th	
2010–2011	3rd place, bronze medalist(s)	10th	10th	3rd place, bronze medalist(s)	3rd place, bronze medalist(s)	9th	
2011–2012	6th	8th	6th	–	–	4th	
2012–2013	–	–	–	8th	8th	7th	

Season	5000/10000 meter					
2000–2001						
2001–2002						
2002–2003						
2003–2004	7th	–*	9th	–	–	–*
2004–2005						
2005–2006						
2006–2007	–	1st(b)	–*	–	–*	–
2007–2008						
2008–2009						
2009–2010						
2010–2011						
2011–2012						
2012–2013						

Season	Team Pursuit			
2000–2001				
2001–2002				
2002–2003				
2003–2004				
2004–2005	–	1st place, gold medalist(s)	–	
2005–2006				
2006–2007				
2007–2008	6th	–	–	–
2008–2009				
2009–2010				
2010–2011				
2011–2012				
2012–2013				

- NC = No classification
- DSQ = Disqualified
- DNF = Did not finish
- DNQ = Did not qualify
- * = 10000 meter

== Medals won ==
Championship	Gold (gold)	Silver (silver)	Bronze (bronze)
Dutch Allround	7	4	5
European Allround	3	6	3
World Allround	0	3	0
Dutch Sprint	1	3	5
Dutch Single Distance	0	5	5
World Single Distance	1	2	0
Olympic Games	1	0	2
World Cup 1000m	0	1	4
World Cup 1500m	5	5	7
World Cup Team pursuit	1	0	0
World Cup GWC Classification	2	2	1
World Junior Allround	4	2	2

Awards
Preceded by Epke Zonderland	Dutch Sportsman of the year 2010	Succeeded by Epke Zonderland
