= Jan Bos =

Dutch speed skater and cyclist

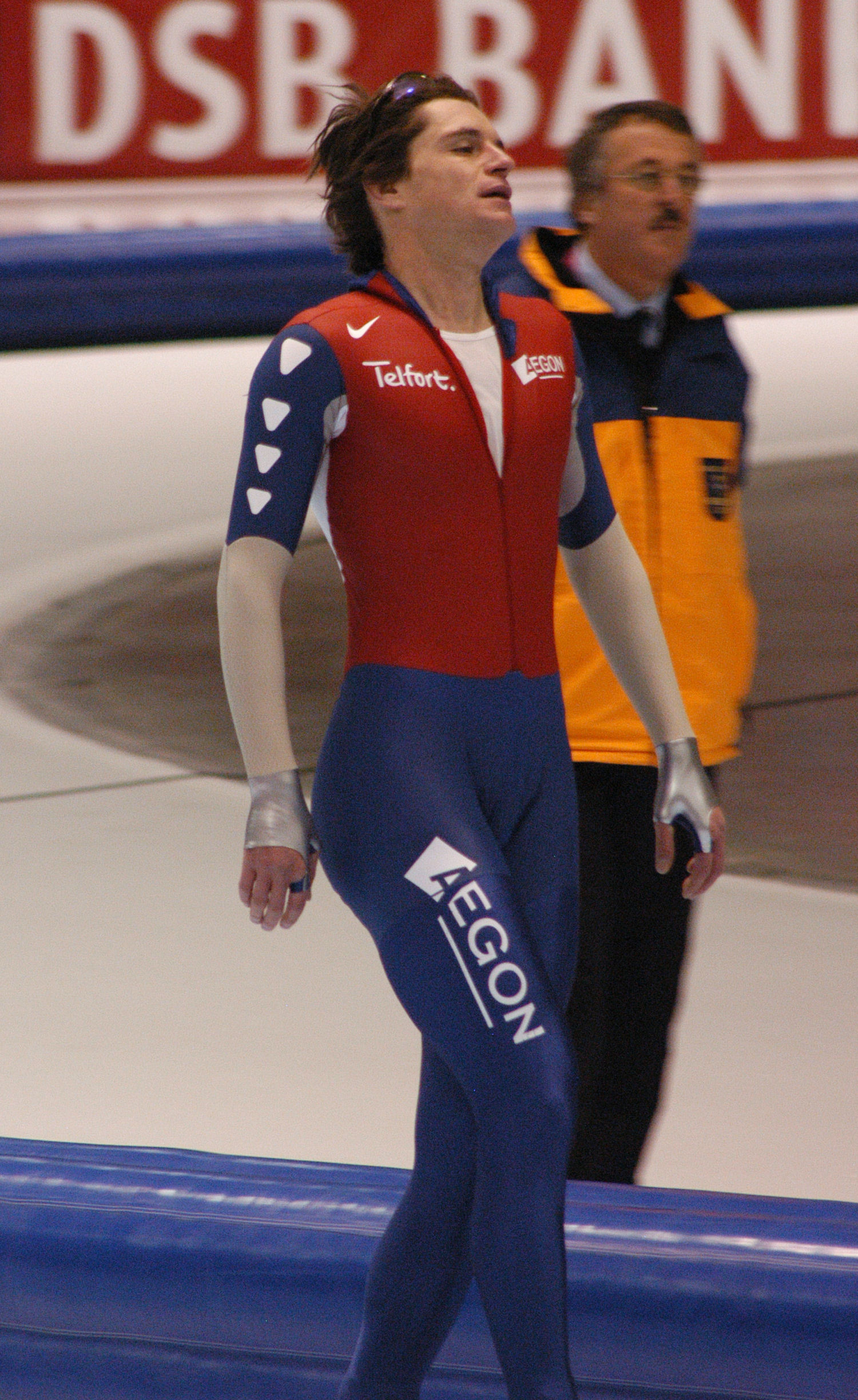
- Bos in 2007

Personal information
- Born: 29 March 1975 (age 51) Harderwijk, Netherlands
- Height: 190 cm (6 ft 3 in)
- Weight: 83 kg (183 lb)

Sport
- Country: Netherlands
- Sport: Speed skating
Medal record
Men's speed skating
Representing the Netherlands
Olympic Games
Silver medal – second place	1998 Nagano	1000 m
Silver medal – second place	2002 Salt Lake City	1000 m
World Sprint Championships
Gold medal – first place	1998 Berlin	Sprint
Silver medal – second place	1999 Calgary	Sprint
Bronze medal – third place	2006 Heerenveen	Sprint
World Single Distance Championships
Silver medal – second place	1997 Warsaw	1000 m
Gold medal – first place	1999 Heerenveen	1000 m
Silver medal – second place	2000 Nagano	1000 m
Bronze medal – third place	2000 Nagano	1500 m
Silver medal – second place	2005 Inzell	1000 m

Jan Bos (born 29 March 1975) is a Dutch former speedskater and sprint cyclist. In the late 1990s he was world champion in speed skating and he competed in the 1998, 2002, 2006 and 2010 Winter Olympics.

== Speed skater ==
In 1998 Bos both became the world champion sprint and won the silver medal that year in the 1000 meter sprint during the Winter Olympics in Nagano. He won the silver medal on that same distance in Salt Lake City.

He competed at the 2004 Summer Olympics in Athens in the team sprint track cycling event, together with his brother Theo Bos, who won the silver at the individual sprint, and Teun Mulder. The Dutch finished sixth after being knocked out by Japan.

Bos ended his career as a competitive speed skater in 2011.

== Cyclist ==
In 2012 Bos (in cooperation with the Human Power Team from Delft) tried to become the fastest cyclist in the world during the World Human Powered Speed Challenge in Battle Mountain, Nevada. At the time, the International Human Powered Vehicle Association record was 133 km/h, held by the Canadian Sam Whittingham. Bos used a recumbent bicycle specially developed for the occasion by students of the Delft University of Technology and the Vrije Universiteit Amsterdam, but only managed a maximum speed of 126.5 km/h. In September 2013, his teammate Sebastiaan Bowier did manage to break the record, reaching a speed of 133.78 kilometres per hour (83.13 mph)

== Records ==
=== Personal records ===
Personal records
Men's speed skating
Event	Result	Date	Location	Notes
500 meter	34.72	12 February 2002	Salt Lake City	
1000 meter	1:07.20	22 March 2009	Calgary	
1500 meter	1:44.87	4 March 2007	Calgary	
3000 meter	3:50.53	16 March 2001	Calgary	
5000 meter	6:46.59	17 March 2001	Calgary	
10000 meter	15:23.18	11 March 1993	Heerenveen	

Bos specialized in the sprint events but does have an Adelsalender score of 156.494

Source: www.sskating.com & SpeedskatingResults.com

=== World records ===
Event	Result	Date	Location	Notes
1000 meter	1:10.63	22 November 1997	Calgary	World record until 23 November 1997
1000 meter	1:08.55	21 February 1999	Calgary	World record until 12 January 2000

Source: SpeedSkatingStats.com

== Tournament overview ==
Season	Dutch Championships Allround	Dutch Championships Single Distances	Dutch Championships Sprint	World Championships Sprint	World Championships Single Distances	Olympic Games	World Cup	World Championships Junior Allround
1992–93		DEVENTER 18th 500m 12th 1000m 22nd 1500m						BASELGA di PINÈ 22nd 500m 5th 3000m 9th 1500m 12th 5000m 9th overall
1993–94	THE HAGUE 4th 500m 14th 5000m 8th 1500m 12th 10000m 12th overall	HEERENVEEN 9th 500m 6th 1000m 10th 1500m						BERLIN 10th 500m (silver) 3000m (gold) 1500m (gold) 5000m (gold) overall
1994–95		THE HAGUE 5th 500m 4th 1000m 10th 1500m	ALKMAAR (bronze) 500m 4th 1000m 8th 500m (bronze) 1000m 5th overall					
1995–96		GRONINGEN (silver) 500m (silver) 1000m	ASSEN 5th 500m (bronze) 1000m 7th 500m 4th 1000m (bronze) overall	HEERENVEEN 30th 500m 24th 1000m 31st 500m 25th 1000m 24th overall			39th 1000m	
1996–97			GRONINGEN (gold) 500m (gold) 1000m (silver) 500m (gold) 1000m (gold) overall	HAMAR 17th 500m 15th 1000m 16th 500m 10th 1000m 13th overall	WARSAW 8th 500m (silver) 1000m		20th 500m 4th 1000m	
1997–98		HEERENVEEN (gold) 500m (gold) 1000m 5th 1500m	GRONINGEN (gold) 500m (gold) 1000m (gold) 500m (silver) 1000m (gold) overall	BERLIN (gold) 500m (gold) 1000m 4th 500m (gold) 1000m (gold) overall	CALGARY 5th 500m 4th 1000m	NAGANO 12th 500m (silver) 1000m 4th 1500m	5th 500m (silver) 1000m 17th 1500m	
1998–99		GRONINGEN (gold) 500m (silver) 1000m (bronze) 1500m	GRONINGEN (gold) 500m (gold) 1000m (gold) 500m 5th 1000m (gold) overall	COLLALBO 6th 500m (gold) 1000m (bronze) 500m (gold) 1000m (silver) overall	HEERENVEEN DNF 500m (gold) 1000m		4th 500m (silver) 1000m 6th 1500m	
1999–2000		DEVENTER (silver) 500m (silver) 1000m	UTRECHT (gold) 500m (gold) 1000m (bronze) 500m (gold) 1000m (gold) overall	SEOUL 6th 500m (gold) 1000m 5th 500m (gold) 1000m 4th overall	NAGANO 5th 500m (silver) 1000m (bronze) 1500m		5th 500m (bronze) 1000m 6th 1500m	
2000–01		THE HAGUE (silver) 500m (silver) 1000m 10th 1500m		INZELL 6th 500m 6th 1000m 7th 500m (silver) 1000m 4th overall	SALT LAKE CITY 21st 500m 10th 1000m		8th 500m 10th 1000m 23rd 1500m	
2001–02		GRONINGEN (gold) 500m (gold) 1000m 5th 1500m	GRONINGEN (silver) 500m (bronze) 1000m (bronze) 500m (gold) 1000m (silver) overall	HAMAR (bronze) 500m 14th 1000m 39th 500m DQ 1000m NC overall		SALT LAKE CITY 9th 500m (silver) 1000m 7th 1500m	7th 500m (silver) 1000m 26th 1500m	
2002–03		UTRECHT (bronze) 500m (bronze) 1000m	GRONINGEN (gold) 500m (gold) 1000m (gold) 500m (bronze) 1000m (gold) overall	CALGARY 11th 500m 6th 1000m 7th 500m 7th 1000m 7th overall	BERLIN 5th 500m 15th 1000m		5th 500m (bronze) 1000m	
2003–04		HEERENVEEN (bronze) 500m 7th 1000m	UTRECHT 4th 500m 7th 1000m (bronze) 500m 6th 1000m 6th overall		SEOUL 14th 500m 5th 1000m		28th 100m 16th 500m 9th 1000m	
2004–05		ASSEN 4th 500m 5th 1000m 10th 1500m	GRONINGEN 4th 500m (silver) 1000m (silver) 500m 4th 1000m (silver) overall	SALT LAKE CITY 14th 500m (gold) 1000m 11th 500m (bronze) 1000m 6th overall	INZELL (silver) 1000m		23rd 500m 5th 1000m	
2005–06		HEERENVEEN (gold) 500m (gold) 1000m (gold) 1500m		HEERENVEEN (bronze) 500m (gold) 1000m 10th 500m 5th 1000m (bronze) overall		TURIN 11th 500m 5th 1000m 20th 1500m	43rd 500m 12th 1000m 7th 1500m	
2006–07		ASSEN (gold) 500m (gold) 1000m (bronze) 1500m	GRONINGEN (gold) 500m (silver) 1000m 6th 500m (silver) 1000m (silver) overall	HAMAR 15th 500m 8th 1000m 17th 500m 8th 1000m 12th overall	SALT LAKE CITY 16th 500m		36th 100m 19th 500m 4th 1000m 6th 1500m	
2007–08		HEERENVEEN 5th 500m (silver) 1000m 9th 1500m	HEERENVEEN 4th 500m (gold) 1000m 4th 500m (gold) 1000m (gold) overall	HEERENVEEN 6th 500m (gold) 1000m 40th 500m (silver) 1000m 39th overall	NAGANO 5th 1000m		25th 100m 24th 500m (bronze) 1000m	
2008–09		HEERENVEEN 8th 500m 6th 1000m	GRONINGEN (bronze) 500m 4th 1000m 7th 500m 4th 1000m 4th overall		VANCOUVER 5th 1000m		12th 1000m	
2009–10		HEERENVEEN 8th 500m 7th 1000m				VANCOUVER 29th 500m 12th 1000m	51st 500m 15th 1000m	
2010–11		HEERENVEEN 10th 500m (bronze) 1000m	HEERENVEEN (bronze) 500m (silver) 1000m 6th 500m (silver) 1000m (bronze) overall	HEERENVEEN 14th 500m 11th 1000m 21st 500m 7th 1000m 12th overall			41st 500m 6th 1000m	

- DNF = Did not finish
- DQ = Disqualified

== See also ==
- List of Dutch Olympic cyclists

Olympic Games
Preceded by Nicolien Sauerbreij	Flagbearer for Netherlands; Turin 2006	Succeeded by Timothy Beck
