= Remco olde Heuvel =

Dutch former speed skater

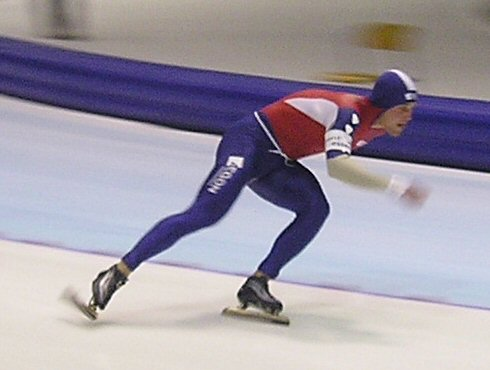

Personal information
- Born: November 24, 1983 (age 42) Losser

Sport
- Country: Netherlands
- Sport: Speed skating
- Retired: 2012

Achievements and titles
- Personal best(s): 500 m: 35.10 (2009); 1000 m: 1:08.15 (2007); 1500 m: 1:43.49 (2009); 3000 m: 3:45.87 (2003); 5000 m: 6:39.99 (2002); 10,000 m: 15:09.48 (2002)

Remco olde Heuvel (Losser, November 24, 1983) is a Dutch former speed skater. His specialty was the sprint and middle distances. After riding for the VPZ skating team for several years, he made the switch to TVM in 2010 for which his younger brother Wouter had been riding for several years. In 2012, he left TVM again. On November 20, 2012, he announced that he would stop skating because he could no longer muster the motivation to continue.

== Biography ==
On November 12, 2005 Olde Heuvel, together with Jochem Uytdehaage and Rintje Ritsma, rode in the team pursuit in Calgary to 3.41.63. At the end of October 2006, Olde Heuvel set the unofficial world record outdoor track in the 1500 meters on the ice rink of the Bavarian Inzell. His finishing time was 1.47.81: that made him five hundredths of a second faster than the old record held by Mark Tuitert. In the 2007/2008 season he qualified for the first two World Cup competitions during the National Distances Championships at 1000 meters. In 2009, Olde Heuvel finished fourth in the 1500 meters. He was also selected for the team pursuit where he, together with Jan Blokhuijsen and Koen Verweij, set the winning time in Thialf, together with the USA team at 3.43.94. His younger brother Wouter is also a speed skater.
