= Pien Keulstra =

Dutch speed skater and triathlete (born 1993)

Personal information
- Born: 6 November 1993 (age 33) Boekelo, Overijssel, Netherlands

Sport
- Sport: Triathlon, duathlon (nowadays); Speed skating (formerly)

Pien Keulstra (born 6 November 1993) is a Dutch triathlete and former long-track speed skater. Her brother, Ynze Keulstra, is also a triathlete.

== Biography ==
=== Speed skating ===
Keulstra began her speed skating career within the Overijssel regional branch of the Royal Dutch Skating Federation (Koninklijke Nederlandsche Schaatsenrijders Bond; KNSB) and at the Hengelo Ice Skating Club. In the 2010/2011 season, she was a member of the Jong Oranje (Young Orange) speed skating team. In November 2010, on her seventeenth birthday, she made her début at the 2011 Dutch Single Distances Championships. As a "B-junior" (a category for skaters aged 15–17), Keulstra was granted a special exemption by the KNSB after qualifying for the 1500-metre and 3000-metre events through the Holland Cup. She finished fourteenth and tenth in those respective distances, setting personal bests in both.

At the 2011 World Junior All-round Speed Skating Championships in Seinäjoki, Finland, Keulstra finished second, behind world champion Karolína Erbanová and ahead of the previous year's champion, Lotte van Beek.

During the 2012 NK Distances, in November 2011, one day before her 18th birthday, Keulstra became the youngest Dutch champion over 3000 metres in a new personal record: 4:09.75. A day later, on her birthday, she won the 5000 metres in another personal record: 7:12.55. On 8 November, Ab Krook stated that he believed that it was important "to cherish this talent and protect her". Krook emphasized to the KNSB that caution was required because it regularly happens that juniors "no longer count" when they reach the age of 23. She made her senior World Cup debut on 2 December 2011. She won the 5000 metres in the B-group, setting a new national junior record of 7:03.60, the day's third-fastest time.

=== Health problems ===
Keulstra did not participate in the qualifying races for the 2012 European All-round Speed Skating Championships owing to a swollen ankle arising from an injury. On 8 October 2012, the KNSB announced that Keulstra needed to take time off for health issues related to her recovery from an eating disorder.

In an extensive interview with the penultimate issue of NUsport in October 2013, it was revealed that homesickness, experienced while living in an apartment for seniors, far from her familiar surroundings, had led to an eating disorder. Furthermore, there was a strained relationship with the Dutch speed skating federation (KNSB), which introduced the term "anorexia" to the press. Tensions also escalated between her father, Jos Keulstra, and discipline manager Emiel Kluin after discussions regarding her "ideal weight." Although she made a comeback in late November with a training race at Thialf, a training camp in Inzell around mid-December 2012 ultimately brought her season to an end, and she returned to Boekelo. In April 2013, she began a new training programme with the aim of joining Jac Orie's Team Activia.

=== Marathon speed skating and triathlon ===
In 2014, Keulstra was part of Schaatsmeiden.nl, a team active in the marathon speed skating peloton, and during the summer, she competed in triathlon and duathlon. That year, she won the silver medal at the European U23 Duathlon Championships in Weyer, Austria. On 31 May 2015, Keulstra became the Dutch national champion in the Olympic-distance triathlon (1.5-kilometre swim, 40-kilometre cycle, and 10-kilometre run) in Weert, finishing ahead of Sarissa de Vries and Ilona Eversdijk. A month later, she decided to focus wholly on triathlon. In 2015, she won the winter triathlon with a time of 2:41:39.

Since May 2015, Keulstra has been affiliated with the National Training Centre for triathletes in Sittard. Earlier, she had been a member of Triathlon Club Twente, based in Borne and Enschede.

== Titles ==
- Dutch national champion in Olympic-distance triathlon — 2015

== Personal bests in speed skating ==
Distance	Time	Date	Track
500 m	40.68	18 December 2010	(Germany) Erfurt
1000 m	1:20.08	19 March 2011	(Netherlands) Heerenveen
1500 m	2:00.58	6 November 2011	(Netherlands) Heerenveen
3000 m	4:05.72	18 January 2014	(Germany) Inzell
5000 m	7:03.60 *	2 December 2011	(Netherlands) Heerenveen

* NR juniors

== Speed skating results ==
Year	NK Distance	NK All-round	NK Juniors	WK Juniors
2009			2nd (C-jr)	
2010			2nd (B-jr)	
2011	14th 1500 m 10th 3000 m	NC13 (15th, 18th, 11th, -)	2nd (A-jr)	(silver) (6th, (silver) , 5th, (bronze) )
2012	10th 1500 m (gold) 3000 m (gold) 5000 m	5th (11th, (bronze) , 9th, (bronze) )		6th (19th, (bronze) , 10th, (bronze) )
2013	-			
2014	11th 3000 m 7th 5000 m	9th		

=== Medal table ===
Championship	Gold (gold)	Silver (silver)	Bronze (bronze)
NK Distance	2	0	0
NK All-round Distance	0	0	2
WK Juniors	0	1	0
