= Lars Elgersma =

Dutch speed skater

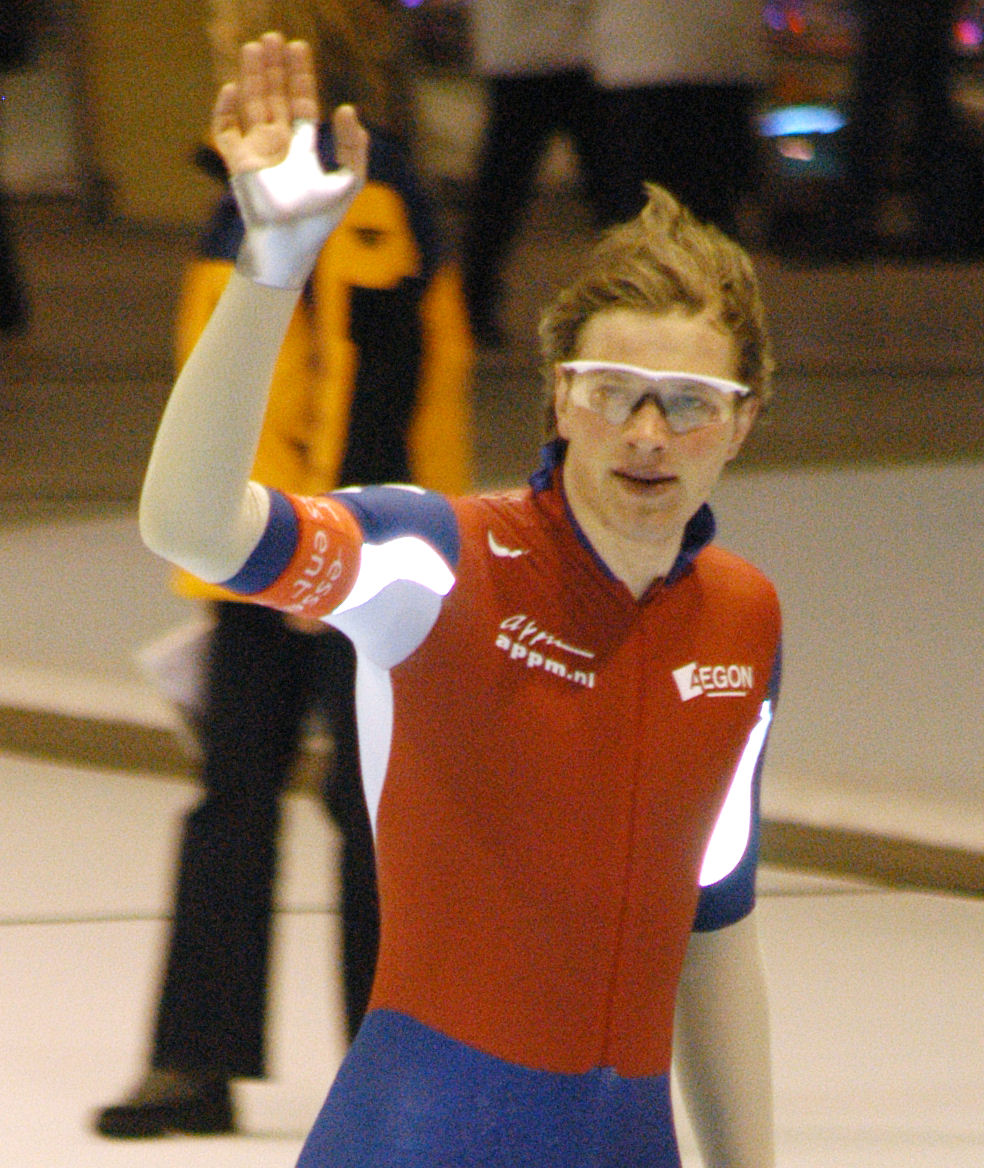

Personal information
- Born: 25 October 1983 (age 42) Nieuwerkerk aan den IJssel, Netherlands

Sport
- Country: Netherlands
- Sport: Speed skating
Medal record
Men's speed skating
Representing the Netherlands
Winter Universiade
Bronze medal – third place	2007 Turin	1000 m

Lars Elgersma (born 25 October 1983) is a Dutch speed skater, specialising in short and middle distances.

At the 2007 KNSB Dutch Single Distance Championships Elgersma finished fifth over 500 metres and eighth over 1000 metres, which gave him the opportunity to skate in several Speed Skating World Cup meetings throughout the season. He also represented his country at the 2007 Winter Universiade held in Turin where he won the bronze medal over 1000 metres.
