= Michel Mulder =

Dutch speed skater (born 1986)

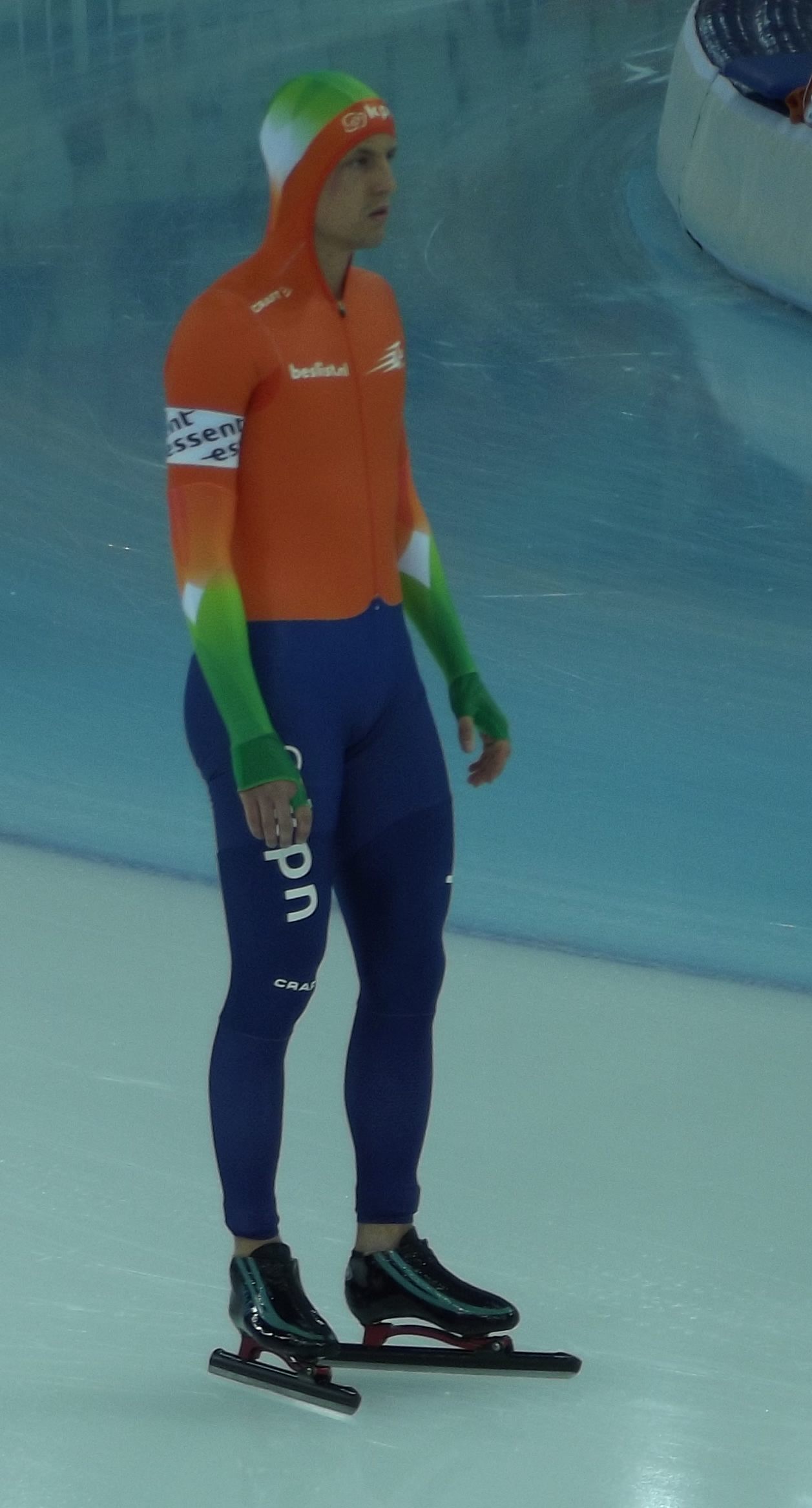

Personal information
- Born: 27 February 1986 (age 40) Zwolle, Netherlands
- Height: 1.84 m (6 ft 0 in)
- Weight: 82 kg (181 lb)

Sport
- Country: Netherlands
- Sport: Speed skating
Medal record
Men's speed skating
Representing Netherlands
Olympic Games
Gold medal – first place	2014 Sochi	500 m
Bronze medal – third place	2014 Sochi	1000 m
World Sprint Championships
Gold medal – first place	2013 Salt Lake City	Sprint
Gold medal – first place	2014 Nagano	Sprint
World Single Distance Championships
Silver medal – second place	2012 Heerenveen	500 m
Silver medal – second place	2015 Heerenveen	500 m

Michel Mulder (born 27 February 1986) is a Dutch speed skater. He is the 2014 Olympic Champion at the 500 m distance and 2014 Olympic bronze medalist at the 1,000 m distance. He finished second in the men's 500 metres event at the 2012 World Single Distance Speed Skating Championships. His twin brother, Ronald Mulder, is also a speed skater. Despite being the defending champion for the 500m distance at the Olympic Games, Michel did not qualify for the 2018 Olympics. His twin brother competed in the event and finished in 7th place.

In 2024, he won the first season of the television show Stars on Stage. He is also a contestant in the 2026 season of the photography television show Het Perfecte Plaatje.

== Personal records ==
Distance	Result	Date	Location
500 m	34.26	15 November 2013	Salt Lake City
1000 m	1:07.46	16 November 2013	Salt Lake City
1500 m	1:48.59	20 March 2011	Calgary
3000 m	4:09.63	13 January 2008	Heerenveen
5000 m	7:31.06	11 November 2007	Heerenveen

Source: SpeedskatingResults.com

== See also ==
- List of Olympic medalist families
