= Simon Kuipers =

Dutch speed skater (born 1982)

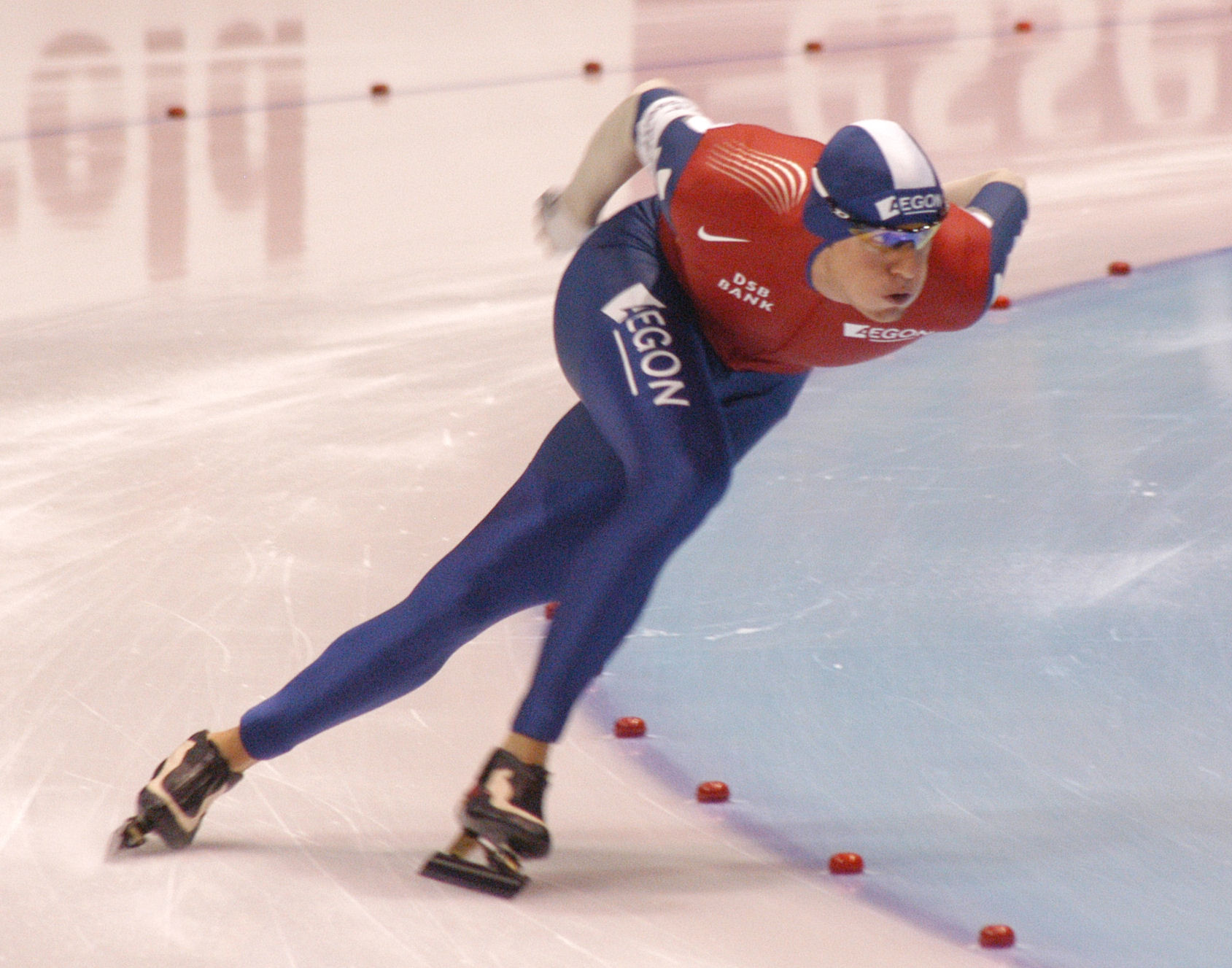
- Kuipers in 2007

Personal information
- Born: 9 August 1982 (age 43) Haarlem, Netherlands
- Website: www.simonkuipers.nl

Sport
- Country: Netherlands
- Sport: Speed skating
- Turned pro: 2001
Medal record
Men's speed skating
Representing the Netherlands
Olympic Games
Bronze medal – third place	2010 Vancouver	Team pursuit
World Sprint Championships
Bronze medal – third place	2009 Moscow	Sprint

Simon Kuipers (born 9 August 1982) is a retired Dutch speed skater. He won a 1500 meters World Cup competitions on 3 December 2005. It was his first World Cup victory. He participated in two events at the 2006 Winter Olympics in Turin, finishing 23rd in the 500 metres, and 4th in the 1500 metres, less than four-tenths of a second off the podium, as well as being the fastest Dutchman in that event. He officially retired in March 2012.

== Personal records ==
Personal records
Men's speed skating
Event	Result	Date	Location	Notes
500 m	34.78	17 November 2007	Calgary	
1000 m	1:07.39	18 November 2007	Calgary	
1500 m	1:42.37	16 November 2007	Calgary	
3000 m	3:42.42	14 March 2007	Calgary	
5000 m	6:21.57	15 March 2007	Calgary	
10000 m	14:56.67	27 January 2002	Groningen	

Source: SpeedskatingResults.com

== Tournament overview ==
Season	Dutch Championships Single Distances	Dutch Championships Sprint	Dutch Championships Allround	World Championships Sprint	World Championships Single Distances	Olympic Games	World Cup GWC	World Championships Junior Allround
2000–01								GRONINGEN 11th 500m 15th 3000m 15th 1500m 10th 5000m 10th overall
2001–02	GRONINGEN 18th 500m		ALKMAAR (silver) 500m 16th 5000m 4th 1500m 10th 10000m 8th overall					
2002–03	UTRECHT 11th 500m 9th 1000m 9th 1500m	GRONINGEN 9th 500m 13th 1000m 8th 500m 7th 1000m 8th overall						
2003–04	HEERENVEEN 8th 500m 5th 1000m 9th 1500m	UTRECHT 6th 500m (bronze) 1000m 6th 500m 4th 1000m 4th overall		NAGANO 25th 500m 7th 1000m 23rd 500m 8th 1000m 17th overall			39th 500m 23rd 1000m	
2004–05	ASSEN 5th 500m (bronze) 1000m (bronze) 1500m	GRONINGEN 5th 500m 9th 1000m 5th 500m 7th 1000m 5th overall			INZELL 21st 1500m		27th 500m 11th 1000m 6th 1500m	
2005–06	HEERENVEEN 500m					TURIN 23rd 500m 4th 1500m	31st 500m 41st 1000m 6th 1500m	
2006–07	ASSEN 18th 500m 4th 1000m (silver) 1500m	GRONINGEN 9th 500m 5th 1000m 7th 500m (bronze) 1000m 6th overall			SALT LAKE CITY 11th 1000m 8th 1500m		19th 1000m 7th 1500m	
2007–08	HEERENVEEN (silver) 500m (gold) 1000m (gold) 1500m	HEERENVEEN (silver) 500m 7th 1000m (bronze) 500m 7th 1000m 4th overall		HEERENVEEN 14th 500m (silver) 1000m 4th 500m 6th 1000m 4th overall	NAGANO 15th 500m 7th 1000m 5th 1500m		20th 100m 13th 500m 4th 1000m (silver) 1500m	
2008–09	HEERENVEEN (silver) 500m 4th 1000m (bronze) 1500m	GRONINGEN 6th 500m 5th 1000m (silver) 500m 9th 1000m 5th overall		MOSCOW 6th 500m (silver) 1000m 16th 500m 4th 1000m (bronze) overall	VANCOUVER 16th 500m 6th 1000m		19th 100m 12th 500m 4th 1000m 11th 1500m 6th Team pursuit	
2009–10	HEERENVEEN 6th 500m (silver) 1000m 8th 1500m	GRONINGEN (bronze) 500m 12th 1000m DNS 500m DNS 1000m NC overall				VANCOUVER 20th 500m 6th 1000m 7th 1500; (bronze) Team pursuit	27th 500m 4th 1000m 32nd 1500m	
2010–11	HEERENVEEN DQ 500m (gold) 1000m (gold) 1500m	HEERENVEEN 7th 500m DNS 1000m DNS 500m DNS 1000m NC overall			INZELL 17th 500m 6th 1000m 11th 1500m		21st 500m 4th 1000m 6th 1500m	
2011–12	HEERENVEEN 11th 500m 12th 1000m 13th 1500m							

- DNS = Did not start
- DNF = Did not finish
- DQ = Disqualified
- NC = No classification

== Medals won ==
Championship	Gold (gold)	Silver (silver)	Bronze (bronze)
Dutch Single Distances	2	4	3
World Sprint	0	0	1
World Cup	0	1	0
