= 2013–14 ISU Speed Skating World Cup – World Cup 4 – Women's 500 metres =

The women's 500 metres races of the 2013–14 ISU Speed Skating World Cup 4, arranged in Sportforum Hohenschönhausen, in Berlin, Germany, were held on 6 and 7 December 2013.

In race one, Lee Sang-hwa of South Korea extended her suite of victories from the start of the season, while Olga Fatkulina of Russia came second, and Wang Beixing of China came third. Vanessa Bittner of Austria won the Division B race.

Lee didn't skate in race two. In her absence, Fatkulina and Wang both advanced one place on the podium, taking the gold and silver medals, while Heather Richardson of the United States, who was in fourth place in race one, made it to the podium, taking the bronze. Mayon Kuipers of the Netherlands won the second Division B race.

== Race 1 ==
Race one took place on Friday, 6 December, with Division B scheduled in the morning session, at 09:50, and Division A scheduled in the afternoon session, at 15:15.

=== Division A ===
Rank	Name	Nat.	Pair	Lane	Time	WC points	GWC points
1st place, gold medalist(s)	Lee Sang-hwa	(South Korea)	10	i	37.36	100	5
2nd place, silver medalist(s)	Olga Fatkulina	(Russia)	9	o	37.71	80	4
3rd place, bronze medalist(s)	Wang Beixing	(China)	8	i	37.79	70	3.5
4	Heather Richardson	(United States)	9	i	37.801	60	3
5	Nao Kodaira	(Japan)	8	o	37.802	50	2.5
6	Thijsje Oenema	(Netherlands)	6	i	38.22	45	—
7	Brittany Bowe	(United States)	7	o	38.26	40	
8	Margot Boer	(Netherlands)	7	i	38.32	36	
9	Anice Das	(Netherlands)	3	o	38.41	32	
10	Maki Tsuji	(Japan)	6	o	38.45	28	
11	Miyako Sumiyoshi	(Japan)	4	i	38.46	24	
12	Erina Kamiya	(Japan)	3	i	38.65	21	
13	Lauren Cholewinski	(United States)	4	o	38.67	18	
14	Lee Bo-ra	(South Korea)	1	i	38.68	16	
15	Yekaterina Aydova	(Kazakhstan)	5	o	38.70	14	
16	Kaylin Irvine	(Canada)	1	o	38.71	12	
17	Karolína Erbanová	(Czech Republic)	2	i	38.73	10	
18	Judith Hesse	(Germany)	5	i	38.74	8	
19	Elli Ochowicz	(United States)	2	o	38.90	6	
20	Jenny Wolf	(Germany)	10	o	1:22.08	5	

=== Division B ===
Rank	Name	Nat.	Pair	Lane	Time	WC points
1	Vanessa Bittner	(Austria)	7	o	38.78	25
2	Mayon Kuipers	(Netherlands)	12	i	38.90	19
3	Jennifer Plate	(Germany)	13	o	38.99	15
4	Denise Roth	(Germany)	10	o	39.08	11
5	Yuliya Skokova	(Russia)	9	o	39.176	8
6	Marrit Leenstra	(Netherlands)	2	o	39.178	6
7	Marsha Hudey	(Canada)	10	i	39.23	4
8	Yekaterina Lobysheva	(Russia)	8	o	39.240	2
9	Qi Shuai	(China)	6	i	39.244	1
10	Sugar Todd	(United States)	11	o	39.245	—
11	Kali Christ	(Canada)	1	i	39.29	
12	Yekaterina Shikhova	(Russia)	11	i	39.31	
13	Zhang Shuang	(China)	7	i	39.32	
14	Yuliya Liteykina	(Russia)	13	i	39.44	
15	Park Seung-ju	(South Korea)	8	i	39.46	
16	Reika Shimizu	(Japan)	9	i	39.59	
17	Kim Hyun-yung	(South Korea)	12	o	39.66	
18	Elina Risku	(Finland)	5	o	39.670	
19	Paola Simionato	(Italy)	5	i	39.676	
20	Yvonne Daldossi	(Italy)	6	o	39.69	
21	Hege Bøkko	(Norway)	3	o	40.59	
22	Francesca Bettrone	(Italy)	4	i	40.61	
23	Ksenia Zadovskaya	(Belarus)	3	i	40.62	
24	Ágota Lykovcán	(Hungary)	4	o	40.96	
25	Tatyana Sokirko	(Kazakhstan)	2	i	41.34	

== Race 2 ==
Race two took place on Saturday, 7 December, with Division B scheduled in the morning session, at 09:00, and Division A scheduled in the afternoon session, at 13:00.

=== Division A ===
Rank	Name	Nat.	Pair	Lane	Time	WC points	GWC points
1st place, gold medalist(s)	Olga Fatkulina	(Russia)	10	i	37.92	100	5
2nd place, silver medalist(s)	Wang Beixing	(China)	10	o	37.96	80	4
3rd place, bronze medalist(s)	Heather Richardson	(United States)	9	o	38.00	70	3.5
4	Jenny Wolf	(Germany)	1	i	38.23	60	3
5	Thijsje Oenema	(Netherlands)	8	o	38.26	50	2.5
6	Nao Kodaira	(Japan)	9	i	38.35	45	—
7	Miyako Sumiyoshi	(Japan)	6	o	38.49	40	
8	Margot Boer	(Netherlands)	7	o	38.50	36	
9	Judith Hesse	(Germany)	2	o	38.65	32	
10	Maki Tsuji	(Japan)	7	i	38.75	28	
11	Lee Bo-ra	(South Korea)	4	o	38.76	24	
12	Yekaterina Aydova	(Kazakhstan)	5	i	38.80	21	
13	Anice Das	(Netherlands)	8	i	38.87	18	
14	Karolína Erbanová	(Czech Republic)	3	o	38.90	16	
15	Erina Kamiya	(Japan)	5	o	38.992	14	
16	Elli Ochowicz	(United States)	2	i	38.994	12	
17	Vanessa Bittner	(Austria)	3	i	39.00	10	
18	Kaylin Irvine	(Canada)	4	i	39.05	8	
19	Lauren Cholewinski	(United States)	6	i	39.21	6	

=== Division B ===
Rank	Name	Nat.	Pair	Lane	Time	WC points
1	Mayon Kuipers	(Netherlands)	10	o	38.96	25
2	Jennifer Plate	(Germany)	10	i	39.16	19
3	Denise Roth	(Germany)	9	i	39.21	15
4	Marrit Leenstra	(Netherlands)	8	i	39.24	11
5	Zhang Shuang	(China)	7	o	39.29	8
6	Sugar Todd	(United States)	7	i	39.32	6
7	Qi Shuai	(China)	8	o	39.39	4
8	Marsha Hudey	(Canada)	9	o	39.40	2
9	Yuliya Liteykina	(Russia)	6	o	39.59	1
10	Reika Shimizu	(Japan)	4	o	39.61	—
11	Kim Hyun-yung	(South Korea)	6	i	39.69	
12	Park Seung-ju	(South Korea)	5	o	39.78	
13	Paola Simionato	(Italy)	3	o	39.90	
14	Yvonne Daldossi	(Italy)	4	i	39.92	
15	Gabriele Hirschbichler	(Germany)	2	i	39.93	
16	Elina Risku	(Finland)	5	i	39.96	
17	Yevgeniya Dmitriyeva	(Russia)	1	o	40.60	
18	Ágota Lykovcán	(Hungary)	3	i	40.67	
19	Ksenia Sadovskaya	(Belarus)	2	o	40.84	
20	Olga Graf	(Russia)	1	i	41.18	
