= 2013–14 ISU Speed Skating World Cup – World Cup 1 – Women's 1000 metres =

The women's 1000 metres race of the 2013–14 ISU Speed Skating World Cup 1, arranged in the Olympic Oval, in Calgary, Alberta, Canada, was held on 10 November 2013.

Heather Richardson of the United States won, while Lotte van Beek of the Netherlands came second, and Brittany Bowe of the United States came third. Kim Hyun-yung of South Korea won Division B on a new world record for girls, 1:15.18.

== Results ==
The race took place on Sunday, 10 November, with Division A scheduled in the morning session, at 11:30, and Division B scheduled in the afternoon session, at 16:26.

=== Division A ===
Rank	Name	Nat.	Pair	Lane	Time	WC points	GWC points
1st place, gold medalist(s)	Heather Richardson	(United States)	9	o	1:13.23	100	10
2nd place, silver medalist(s)	Lotte van Beek	(Netherlands)	7	i	1:13.36	80	8
3rd place, bronze medalist(s)	Brittany Bowe	(United States)	10	o	1:13.70	70	7
4	Lee Sang-hwa	(South Korea)	1	o	1:14.19	60	6
5	Olga Fatkulina	(Russia)	8	o	1:14.28	50	5
6	Margot Boer	(Netherlands)	5	i	1:14.36	45	—
7	Ireen Wüst	(Netherlands)	8	i	1:14.46	40	
8	Wang Beixing	(China)	2	i	1:14.59	36	
9	Judith Hesse	(Germany)	3	o	1:14.78	32	
10	Christine Nesbitt	(Canada)	10	i	1:15.00	28	
11	Nao Kodaira	(Japan)	4	i	1:15.040	24	
12	Yekaterina Lobysheva	(Russia)	3	i	1:15.041	21	
13	Yu Jing	(China)	7	o	1:15.05	18	
14	Karolína Erbanová	(Czech Republic)	9	i	1:15.07	16	
15	Yekaterina Shikhova	(Russia)	1	i	1:15.13	14	
16	Yekaterina Aydova	(Russia)	6	o	1:15.33	12	
17	Laurine van Riessen	(Netherlands)	5	o	1:15.41	10	
18	Manon Kamminga	(Netherlands)	6	i	1:16.03	8	
19	Yuki Matsuda	(Japan)	4	o	1:16.85	6	
20	Ji Jia	(China)	2	o	1:18.13	5	

=== Division B ===
Rank	Name	Nat.	Pair	Lane	Time	WC points
1	Kim Hyun-yung	(South Korea)	11	o	1:15.18	25
2	Monique Angermüller	(Germany)	17	i	1:15.23	19
3	Yuliya Skokova	(Russia)	14	i	1:15.42	15
4	Luiza Złotkowska	(Poland)	9	o	1:15.46	11
5	Gabriele Hirschbichler	(Germany)	13	o	1:15.64	8
6	Vanessa Bittner	(Austria)	10	i	1:15.71	6
7	Maki Tsuji	(Japan)	12	i	1:15.86	4
8	Kaylin Irvine	(Canada)	16	o	1:15.94	2
9	Yekaterina Malysheva	(Russia)	12	o	1:16.02	1
10	Erina Kamiya	(Japan)	17	o	1:16.08	—
11	Elli Ochowicz	(United States)	1	o	1:16.27	
12	Natalia Czerwonka	(Poland)	2	i	1:16.33	
13	Kali Christ	(Canada)	16	i	1:16.42	
14	Jennifer Plate	(Germany)	4	i	1:16.67	
15	Lee Bo-ra	(South Korea)	11	i	1:16.89	
16	Miho Takagi	(Japan)	15	o	1:16.92	
17	Ida Njåtun	(Norway)	5	o	1:16.97	
18	Sugar Todd	(United States)	10	o	1:17.14	
19	Francesca Bettrone	(Italy)	4	o	1:17.28	
20	Rebekah Bradford	(United States)	3	o	1:17.30	
21	Shannon Rempel	(Canada)	14	o	1:17.48	
22	Kaitlyn McGregor	(Switzerland)	1	i	1:17.62	
23	Ahn Jee-min	(South Korea)	8	i	1:17.71	
24	Qi Shuai	(China)	2	o	1:17.73	
25	Denise Roth	(Germany)	6	i	1:17.83	
26	Zhao Xin	(China)	13	i	1:17.98	
27	Paola Simionato	(Italy)	8	o	1:18.21	
28	Ágota Lykovcán	(Hungary)	7	o	1:18.55	
29	Tatyana Mikhailova	(Belarus)	3	i	1:18.58	
30	Johanna Östlund	(Sweden)	9	i	1:18.75	
31	Tatyana Sokirko	(Kazakhstan)	5	i	1:19.01	
32	Heather McLean	(Canada)	15	i	1:19.27	
33	Elina Risku	(Finland)	7	i	1:19.60	
34	Yvonne Daldossi	(Italy)	6	o	1:19.86	
