= 2012 World Single Distance Speed Skating Championships – Women's 500 metres =

The women's 500 metres race of the 2012 World Single Distance Speed Skating Championships was held on 25 March.

== Results ==
Rank	Name	Country	Pair	Lane	Race 1	Rank	Pair	Lane	Race 2	Rank	Total	Time behind
1st place, gold medalist(s)	Lee Sang-hwa	South Korea	11	i	38.03	1	12	o	37.66	1	75.69	
2nd place, silver medalist(s)	Yu Jing	China	12	o	38.32	6	9	i	37.80	2	76.12	+0.43
3rd place, bronze medalist(s)	Thijsje Oenema	Netherlands	10	o	38.16	2	12	i	38.12	3	76.28	+0.59
4	Heather Richardson	United States	7	o	38.27	3	11	i	38.22	4	76.49	+0.80
5	Christine Nesbitt	Canada	7	i	38.28	4	11	o	38.42	7	76.70	+1.01
6	Jenny Wolf	Germany	11	o	38.54	10	7	i	38.24	5	76.78	+1.09
7	Wang Beixing	China	9	i	38.44	7	10	o	38.36	6	76.80	+1.11
8	Karolína Erbanová	Czech Republic	4	o	38.30	5	10	i	38.59	10	76.89	+1.20
9	Margot Boer	Netherlands	12	i	38.47	8	9	o	38.60	11	77.07	+1.38
10	Maki Tsuji	Japan	9	o	38.49	9	8	i	38.62	12	77.11	+1.42
11	Judith Hesse	Germany	5	i	38.76	12	7	o	38.51	8	77.27	+1.58
12	Miyako Sumiyoshi	Japan	8	i	38.65	11	8	o	38.77	14	77.42	+1.73
13	Laurine van Riessen	Netherlands	8	o	38.89	15	4	i	38.55	9	77.44	+1.75
14	Yekaterina Aydova	Kazakhstan	3	o	38.86	14	5	i	38.67	13	77.53	+1.84
15	Anastasia Bucsis	Canada	6	o	38.76	12	6	i	38.92	16	77.68	+1.99
16	Brittany Bowe	United States	3	i	39.03	18	5	o	38.85	15	77.88	+2.19
17	Olga Fatkulina	Russia	5	o	38.91	16	3	i	39.00	19	77.91	+2.22
18	Nao Kodaira	Japan	10	i	38.98	17	6	o	38.94	17	77.92	+2.23
19	Zhang Hong	China	6	i	39.04	19	4	o	38.97	18	78.01	+2.32
20	Svetlana Radkevich	Belarus	2	o	39.36	22	2	i	39.02	20	78.38	+2.69
21	Shannon Rempel	Canada	2	i	39.25	20	3	o	39.40	21	78.65	+2.96
22	Svetlana Kaykan	Russia	4	i	39.32	21	2	o	39.43	22	78.75	+3.06
23	Kim Hyun-yung	South Korea	1	o	39.41	23	1	i	39.47	23	78.88	+3.19
24	Lauren Cholewinski	United States	1	i	39.88	24	1	o	39.72	24	79.60	+3.91
