= Speed skating at the 2014 Winter Olympics – Women's 500 metres =

Women's 500 metres at the XXII Olympic Winter Games
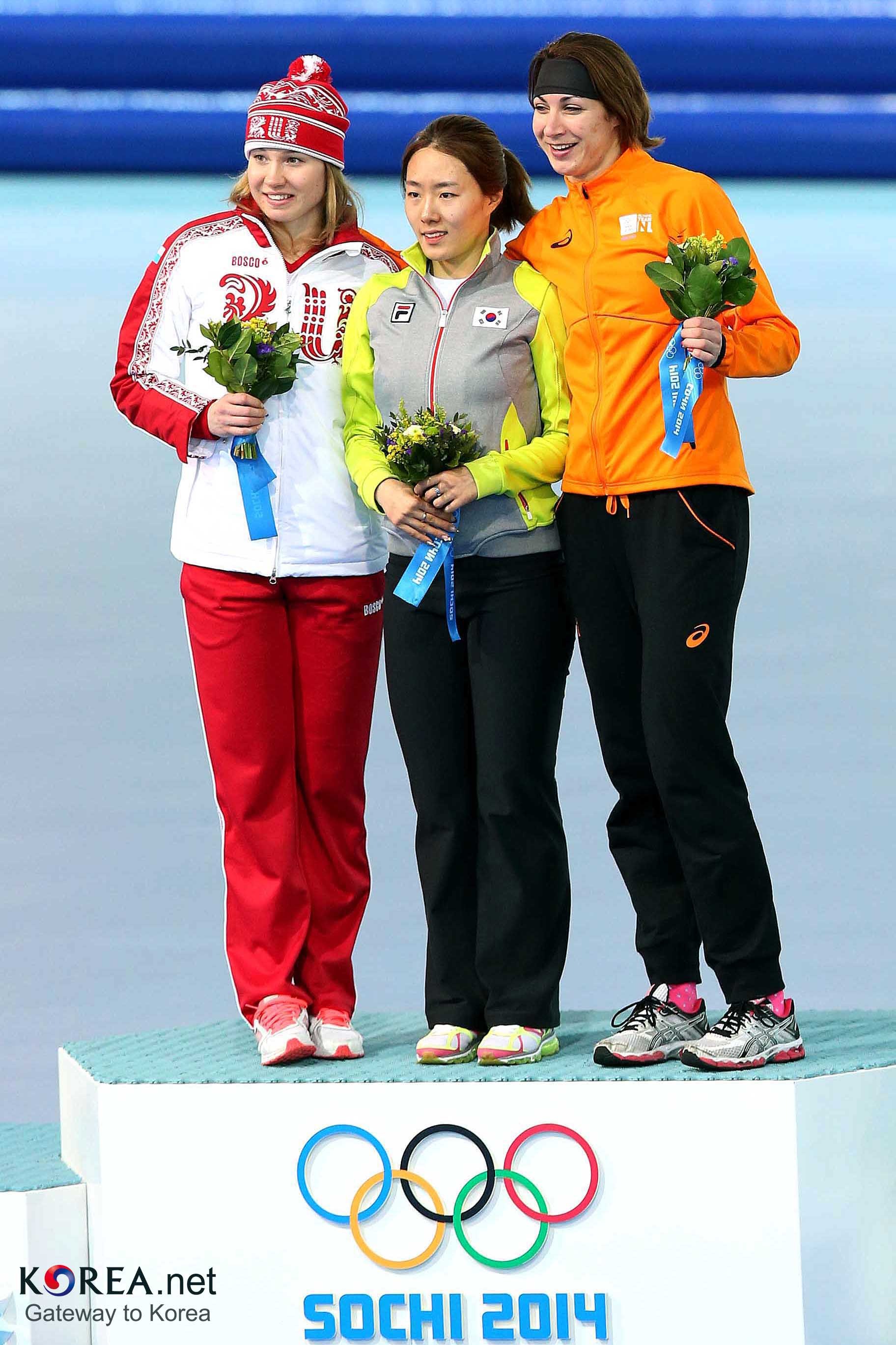
- The podium
- Venue: Adler Arena Skating Center
- Date: 11 February 2014
- Competitors: 35 from 12 nations
- Winning time: 74.70

Medalists
1st place, gold medalist(s)		Lee Sang-hwa	South Korea
2nd place, silver medalist(s)		Olga Fatkulina	Russia
3rd place, bronze medalist(s)		Margot Boer	Netherlands

The women's 500 metres speed skating competition of the 2014 Sochi Olympics was held at Adler Arena Skating Center on 11 February 2014.

The reigning 2014 World Sprint Speed Skating Champion Yu Jing did not start due to reoccurrence of an old waist injury.

== Qualification ==
A total of thirty-six speed skaters could qualify for this distance, with a maximum of four skaters per country. The top 20 of the 2013–14 ISU Speed Skating World Cup – Women's 500 metres standings after the fourth World Cup race in Berlin secured a spot for their country. Then the additional 16 spots were awarded based on a time ranking of all times skated in the World Cup and the 2014 World Sprint Speed Skating Championships. A reserve list was also made.

== Records ==
Prior to this competition, the existing world and Olympic records were as follows.

500 meters (1 race)

World record	Lee Sang-hwa (KOR)	36.36	Salt Lake City, United States	16 November 2013
Olympic record	Catriona Le May Doan (CAN)	37.30	Salt Lake City, United States	13 February 2002

500 meters x 2 (2 races)

World record	Lee Sang-hwa (KOR)	72.93	Salt Lake City, United States	16 November 2013
Olympic record	Catriona Le May Doan (CAN)	74.75	Salt Lake City, United States	14 February 2002

At the 2013 World Single Distance Speed Skating Championships the track records were set by Lee Sang-hwa at 37.65 (single race) and 75.347 (combination).

The following records were set during this competition.

Date	Round	Athlete	Country	Time	Record	Note
11 February	Race 1 Pair 18; Race 2 Pair 17	Lee Sang-hwa	South Korea	74.70	OR, TR	
11 February	Race 1 Pair 16; Race 2 Pair 16	Olga Fatkulina	Russia	75.06	TR	
11 February	Race 2 Pair 17	Lee Sang-hwa	South Korea	37.28	OR, TR	
11 February	Race 1 Pair 18	Lee Sang-hwa	South Korea	37.42	TR	
11 February	Race 1 Pair 16	Olga Fatkulina	Russia	37.57	TR	
11 February	Race 1 Pair 8	Zhang Hong	China	37.58	TR	

OR = Olympic record, TR = track record

== Results ==
The races were held at 16:45 and 18:34. Lee Sang-hwa became the third woman to win back-to-back golds, having previously won the distance at the 2010 Olympics, and the first Korean woman to do so.

On 24 November 2017, silver medalist from Russia Olga Fatkulina was disqualified for a doping violation. On 1 February 2018, her results were restored as a result of the successful appeal.

Rank	Name	Country	Pair	Lane	Race 1	Rank	Notes	Pair	Lane	Race 2	Rank	Notes	Total	Time behind	Notes
1st place, gold medalist(s)	Lee Sang-hwa	South Korea	18	O	37.42	1	TR	17	I	37.28	1	OR, TR	74.70	—	OR, TR
2nd place, silver medalist(s)	Olga Fatkulina	Russia	16	O	37.57	2	TR	16	I	37.49	2		75.06	+0.36	TR
3rd place, bronze medalist(s)	Margot Boer	Netherlands	17	O	37.77	5		13	I	37.71	3		75.48	+0.78	
4	Zhang Hong	China	8	O	37.58	3	TR	15	I	37.99	7		75.58	+0.88	
5	Nao Kodaira	Japan	17	I	37.88	7		16	O	37.72	4		75.61	+0.91	
6	Jenny Wolf	Germany	15	I	37.93	8		15	O	37.73	5		75.67	+0.97	
7	Wang Beixing	China	16	I	37.82	6		17	O	37.86	6		75.68	+0.98	
8	Heather Richardson	United States	15	O	37.73	4		14	I	38.02	8		75.75	+1.05	
9	Maki Tsuji	Japan	14	O	38.4	10		11	I	38.44	11		76.84	+2.14	
10	Karolína Erbanová	Czech Republic	11	O	38.23	9		12	I	38.62	13		76.86	+2.16	
11	Laurine van Riessen	Netherlands	14	I	38.645	14		13	O	38.35	9		76.99	+2.29	
12	Christine Nesbitt	Canada	10	O	38.53	11		10	I	38.61	12		77.15	+2.45	
13	Brittany Bowe	United States	18	I	38.81	17		10	O	38.37	10		77.19	+2.49	
14	Miyako Sumiyoshi	Japan	13	O	38.644	13		9	I	38.62	13		77.26	+2.56	
15	Lauren Cholewinski	United States	12	I	38.54	12		14	O	38.80	19		77.35	+2.65	
16	Lotte van Beek	Netherlands	6	I	38.67	15		12	O	38.73	17		77.40	+2.70	
17	Yekaterina Malysheva	Russia	11	I	38.78	16		11	O	38.76	18		77.55	+2.85	
18	Angelina Golikova	Russia	5	O	38.82	18		8	I	38.85	22		77.68	+2.98	
19	Marrit Leenstra	Netherlands	2	I	39.03	21		7	O	38.70	16		77.74	+3.04	
20	Lee Bo-ra	South Korea	10	I	38.93	20		8	O	38.82	21		77.75	+3.05	
21	Denise Roth	Germany	1	I	39.08	23		6	O	38.69	15		77.78	+3.08	
22	Yekaterina Aydova	Kazakhstan	12	O	39.04	22		7	I	38.80	19		77.85	+3.15	
23	Qi Shuai	China	3	I	38.89	19		9	O	38.99	23		77.89	+3.19	
24	Kim Hyun-yung	South Korea	7	O	39.19	24		6	I	39.04	24		78.23	+3.53	
25	Yekaterina Lobysheva	Russia	8	I	39.202	25		5	O	39.04	24		78.24	+3.54	
26	Park Seung-ju	South Korea	2	O	39.207	26		5	I	39.11	26		78.31	+3.61	
27	Vanessa Bittner	Austria	9	I	39.33	30		2	O	39.17	27		78.50	+3.80	
28	Anastasia Bucsis	Canada	5	I	39.272	27		4	O	39.25	28		78.52	+3.82	
29	Sugar Todd	United States	4	O	39.278	28		4	I	39.25	28		78.53	+3.83	
30	Yvonne Daldossi	Italy	4	I	39.30	29		3	O	39.34	31		78.64	+3.94	
31	Zhang Shuang	China	6	O	39.40	31		3	I	39.25	28		78.65	+3.95	
32	Marsha Hudey	Canada	7	I	39.59	32		1	O	39.63	33		79.22	+4.52	
33	Danielle Wotherspoon-Gregg	Canada	9	O	39.76	33		2	I	39.56	32		79.32	+4.62	
34	Gabriele Hirschbichler	Germany	3	O	39.82	34		1	I	39.69	34		79.51	+4.81	
	Judith Hesse	Germany	13	I	DQ										

OR = Olympic record, TR = track record, DQ = disqualified
