= Japan at the 2014 Winter Olympics =

- IOC code: JPN
- NOC: Japanese Olympic Committee
- Website: www.joc.or.jp (in Japanese and English)

in Sochi
- Competitors: 136 in 15 sports
- Flag bearers: Ayumi Ogasawara (opening and closing)
- Medals Ranked 17th: Gold 1 Silver 4 Bronze 3 Total 8

Winter Olympics appearances (overview)
- 1928; 1932; 1936; 1948; 1952; 1956; 1960; 1964; 1968; 1972; 1976; 1980; 1984; 1988; 1992; 1994; 1998; 2002; 2006; 2010; 2014; 2018; 2022; 2026

Japan competed at the 2014 Winter Olympics in Sochi, Russia from 7 to 23 February 2014. Japan's team consisted of 136 athletes in all 15 sports. The use of Russian alphabet placed it last before the host nation in the Parade of Nations.

The 2014 Games marked the first time a Japanese Olympic team competed in Russia, as Japan and 64 western countries did not take part at the American-led boycott in the 1980 Summer Olympics held in Moscow due to the Soviet–Afghan War.

Japan's Prime Minister Shinzo Abe attended the opening ceremony, wanting to show the Russians how important the relationship between the two countries is.

== Medalists ==
Medals by sport
Sport	1st place, gold medalist(s)	2nd place, silver medalist(s)	3rd place, bronze medalist(s)	Total
Figure skating	1	0	0	1
Snowboarding	0	2	1	3
Ski jumping	0	1	1	2
Nordic combined	0	1	0	1
Freestyle skiing	0	0	1	1
Total	1	4	3	8

Medal	Name	Sport	Event	Date
Gold	Yuzuru Hanyu	Figure skating	Men's singles	14 February
Silver	Ayumu Hirano	Snowboarding	Men's halfpipe	11 February
Silver	Akito Watabe	Nordic combined	Normal hill/10 km	12 February
Silver	Noriaki Kasai	Ski jumping	Men's large hill individual	15 February
Silver	Tomoka Takeuchi	Snowboarding	Women's giant slalom	19 February
Bronze	Taku Hiraoka	Snowboarding	Men's halfpipe	11 February
Bronze	Daiki Ito; Noriaki Kasai; Reruhi Shimizu; Taku Takeuchi	Ski jumping	Team large hill	17 February
Bronze	Ayana Onozuka	Freestyle skiing	Women's halfpipe	20 February

== Alpine skiing ==
According to the quota allocation released on January 27, 2014, Japan has achieved two quota spots in alpine skiing. No one of the several female skiers regularly competing in the World Cup managed to achieve qualification.

Athlete	Event	Run 1		Run 2		Total	
Athlete	Event	Time	Rank	Time	Rank	Time	Rank
Akira Sasaki	Men's slalom	49.54	28	DNF			
Naoki Yuasa	Men's slalom	48.74	20	DNF			

== Biathlon ==
Based on their performance at the 2012 and 2013 Biathlon World Championships Japan qualified 1 man and 4 women.

Athlete	Event	Time	Misses	Rank
Hidenori Isa	Men's sprint	27:15.2	3 (1+2)	71
Hidenori Isa	Men's individual	58:56.1	6 (2+1+1+2)	84
Miki Kobayashi	Women's sprint	25:52.3	5 (1+4)	81
Miki Kobayashi	Women's individual	54:01.0	4 (1+2+1+0)	68
Yuki Nakajima	Women's sprint	24:12.9	2 (1+1)	68
Yuki Nakajima	Women's individual	56:00.2	6 (3+2+1+0)	75
Fuyuko Suzuki	Women's sprint	22:47.4	1 (0+1)	39
Fuyuko Suzuki	Women's pursuit	32:49.0	1 (0+0+0+1)	32
Fuyuko Suzuki	Women's individual	50:27.4	3 (0+1+0+2)	52
Rina Suzuki	Women's sprint	25:40.6	2 (0+2)	80
Rina Suzuki	Women's individual	DNF	2 (0+2)	DNF
Fuyuko Suzuki; Yuki Nakajima; Miki Kobayashi; Rina Suzuki	Women's team relay	LAP	11 (0+11)	13

== Bobsleigh ==
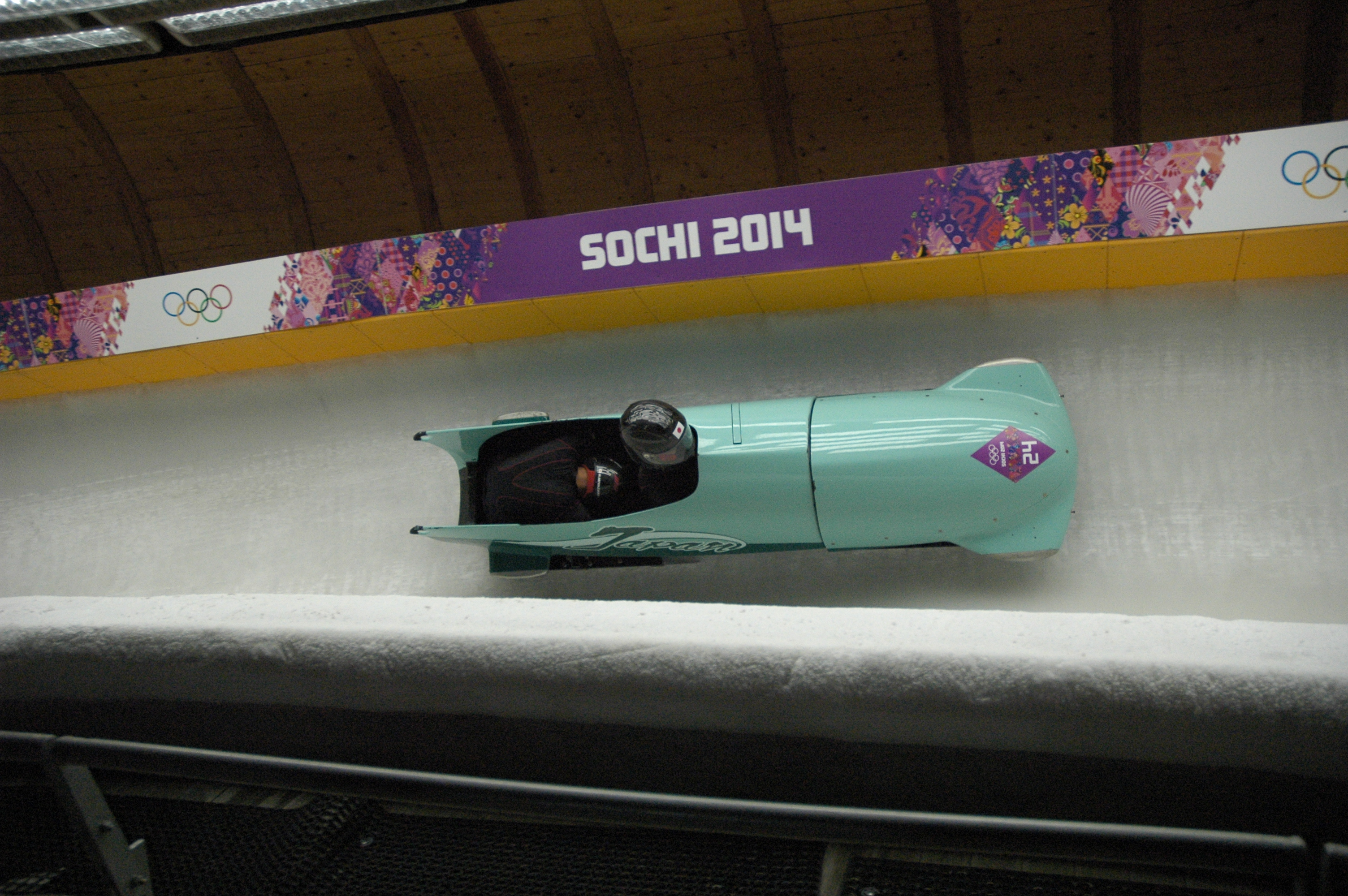
Japanese two-man sled

Athlete	Event	Run 1		Run 2		Run 3		Run 4		Total	
Athlete	Event	Time	Rank	Time	Rank	Time	Rank	Time	Rank	Time	Rank
Hisashi Miyazaki; Hiroshi Suzuki*	Two-man	57.91	27	58.21	28	58.02	28	Did not advance		2:54.14	28
Toshiki Kuroiwa; Hisashi Miyazaki; Shintaro Sato; Hiroshi Suzuki*	Four-man	56.41	26	56.42	26	56.63	28	Did not advance		2:49.46	26

* – Denotes the driver of each sled

== Cross-country skiing ==
According to the quota allocation released on January 27, 2014, Japan has qualified a total of 6 athletes (5 men and 1 woman) in cross-country skiing.

Distance
Men

Athlete	Event	Final		
Athlete	Event	Time	Deficit	Rank
Akira Lenting; Hiroyuki Miyazawa; Nobu Naruse; Keishin Yoshida	4×10 km relay	LAP		

Women

Athlete	Event	Classical		Freestyle		Final		
Athlete	Event	Time	Rank	Time	Rank	Time	Deficit	Rank
Masako Ishida	10 km classical	—N/a				29:55.7	+1:37.9	14
Masako Ishida	15 km skiathlon	19:24.4	8	20:09.6	27	40:08.3	+1:34.7	10
Masako Ishida	30 km freestyle	—N/a				1:14:09.0	+3:03.8	23

Sprint

Athlete	Event	Qualification		Quarterfinal		Semifinal		Final	
Athlete	Event	Time	Rank	Time	Rank	Time	Rank	Time	Rank
Yuichi Onda	Men's sprint	3:40.98	45	Did not advance					
Hiroyuki Miyazawa; Yuichi Onda	Men's team sprint	—N/a				23:49.91	7	Did not advance	

== Curling ==
=== Women's tournament ===
- Ayumi Ogasawara
- Yumie Funayama
- Kaho Onodera
- Michiko Tomabechi
- Chinami Yoshida

Final round robin standings
Team	Skip	Pld	W	L	PF	PA	EW	EL	BE	SE	S%	Qualification
Canada	Jennifer Jones	9	9	0	72	40	43	27	12	14	86%	Playoffs
Sweden	Margaretha Sigfridsson	9	7	2	58	52	37	35	13	7	80%	Playoffs
Switzerland	Mirjam Ott	9	5	4	63	60	37	38	13	7	78%	Playoffs
Great Britain	Eve Muirhead	9	5	4	74	58	39	35	9	11	80%	Playoffs
Japan	Ayumi Ogasawara	9	4	5	59	67	39	41	4	10	76%	
Denmark	Lene Nielsen	9	4	5	57	56	34	40	12	9	78%	
China	Wang Bingyu	9	4	5	58	62	36	38	10	4	81%	
South Korea	Kim Ji-sun	9	3	6	60	65	35	37	10	6	79%	
Russia	Anna Sidorova	9	3	6	48	56	33	35	19	6	82%	
United States	Erika Brown	9	1	8	42	75	33	40	8	5	76%	

Round-robin

Japan has a bye in draws 1, 5 and 9.

Draw 2

Monday, February 11, 9:00

Sheet D	1	2	3	4	5	6	7	8	9	10	Final
South Korea (Kim)	0	2	0	2	0	3	0	2	1	2	12
Japan (Ogasawara) 🔨	2	0	1	0	2	0	2	0	0	0	7

Draw 3

Tuesday, February 11, 19:00

Sheet C	1	2	3	4	5	6	7	8	9	10	Final
Denmark (Nielsen)	0	0	0	0	1	0	2	0	X	X	3
Japan (Ogasawara) 🔨	1	1	2	1	0	1	0	2	X	X	8

Draw 4

Wednesday, February 12, 14:00

Sheet A	1	2	3	4	5	6	7	8	9	10	Final
Japan (Ogasawara) 🔨	0	2	0	0	1	1	1	0	1	2	8
Russia (Sidorova)	0	0	1	1	0	0	0	2	0	0	4

Draw 6

Thursday, February 13, 19:00

Sheet D	1	2	3	4	5	6	7	8	9	10	Final
Japan (Ogasawara) 🔨	0	2	0	0	1	0	1	0	2	0	6
United States (Brown)	1	0	1	2	0	1	0	2	0	1	8

Draw 7

Friday, February 14, 14:00

Sheet B	1	2	3	4	5	6	7	8	9	10	Final
Great Britain (Muirhead) 🔨	2	0	2	1	0	2	5	X	X	X	12
Japan (Ogasawara)	0	2	0	0	1	0	0	X	X	X	3

Draw 8

Saturday, February 15, 9:00

Sheet A	1	2	3	4	5	6	7	8	9	10	Final
Canada (Jones)🔨	2	0	2	0	0	0	2	1	0	1	8
Japan (Ogasawara)	0	2	0	2	1	0	0	0	1	0	6

Draw 10

Sunday, February 16, 14:00

Sheet B	1	2	3	4	5	6	7	8	9	10	11	Final
Japan (Ogasawara)	0	0	2	1	2	0	2	0	0	0	2	9
Switzerland (Ott) 🔨	1	1	0	0	0	3	0	0	1	1	0	7

Draw 11

Monday, February 17, 9:00

Sheet C	1	2	3	4	5	6	7	8	9	10	Final
Japan (Ogasawara) 🔨	2	0	1	0	2	0	1	0	2	X	8
China (Wang)	0	2	0	1	0	1	0	1	0	X	5

Draw 12

Monday, February 17, 19:00

Sheet D	1	2	3	4	5	6	7	8	9	10	Final
Sweden (Sigfridsson) 🔨	0	2	0	2	1	0	0	2	1	X	8
Japan (Ogasawara)	0	0	2	0	0	1	1	0	0	X	4

== Figure skating ==
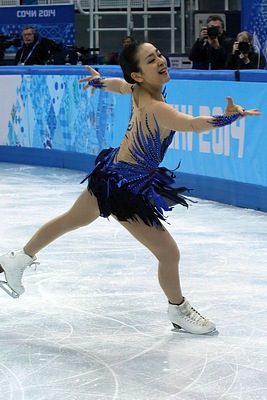
Mao Asada

Japan's ten member team was announced on December 23, 2013. Japan has achieved the following quota places:

Athlete	Event	SP/OD		FS/FD		Total	
Athlete	Event	Points	Rank	Points	Rank	Points	Rank
Yuzuru Hanyu	Men's singles	101.45	1 Q	178.64	1	280.09	1st place, gold medalist(s)
Tatsuki Machida	Men's singles	83.48	11 Q	169.94	4	253.42	5
Daisuke Takahashi	Men's singles	86.40	4 Q	164.27	6	250.67	6
Mao Asada	Ladies' singles	55.51	16 Q	142.71	3	198.22	6
Kanako Murakami	Ladies' singles	55.60	15 Q	115.38	12	170.98	12
Akiko Suzuki	Ladies' singles	60.97	8 Q	125.35	8	186.32	8
Narumi Takahashi / Ryuichi Kihara	Pairs	48.45	18	Did not advance			
Cathy Reed / Chris Reed	Ice dancing	52.29	21	Did not advance			

Team trophy

Athlete	Event	Short program/Short dance						Free skate/Free dance					
Athlete	Event	Men's	Ladies'	Pairs	Ice dance	Total		Men's	Ladies'	Pairs	Ice dance	Total	
Athlete	Event	Points Team points	Points Team points	Points Team points	Points Team points	Points	Rank	Points Team points	Points Team points	Points Team points	Points Team points	Points	Rank
Yuzuru Hanyu (M); Tatsuki Machida (M); Mao Asada (L); Akiko Suzuki (L); Narumi Takahashi / Ryuichi Kihara (P); Cathy Reed / Chris Reed (I)	Team trophy	97.98; 10	64.07; 8	46.56; 3	52.00; 3	24	5 Q	165.85; 8	112.33; 7	86.33; 6	76.34; 6	51	5

== Freestyle skiing ==
Halfpipe

Athlete	Event	Qualification				Final			
Athlete	Event	Run 1	Run 2	Best	Rank	Run 1	Run 2	Best	Rank
Kentaro Tsuda	Men's halfpipe	53.00	23.40	53.00	22	Did not advance			
Manami Mitsuboshi	Women's halfpipe	15.60	9.20	15.60	23	Did not advance			
Ayana Onozuka	Women's halfpipe	83.80	59.80	83.80	4 Q	79.00	83.20	83.20	3rd place, bronze medalist(s)

Moguls

Athlete	Event	Qualification								Final											
Athlete	Event	Run 1				Run 2				Run 1				Run 2				Run 3			
Athlete	Event	Time	Points	Total	Rank	Time	Points	Total	Rank	Time	Points	Total	Rank	Time	Points	Total	Rank	Time	Points	Total	Rank
Sho Endo	Men's moguls	25.19	17.26	23.38	4 QF	Bye				25.53	15.77	21.73	15	Did not advance							
Nobuyuki Nishi	Men's moguls	24.98	14.45	20.67	13	25.96	14.65	20.41	8 Q	24.73	15.39	21.73	14	Did not advance							
Junko Hoshino	Women's moguls	30.95	14.06	19.72	15	32.37	4.52	9.62	15	Did not advance											
Miki Ito	Women's moguls	DNS								Did not advance											
Arisa Murata	Women's moguls	31.33	11.81	16.69	22	32.65	14.39	19.38	5 Q	DNS				Did not advance							
Aiko Uemura	Women's moguls	30.74	15.26	21.01	7 Q	Bye				30.68	14.66	20.43	9 Q	31.19	15.58	21.15	6 Q	30.46	14.8	20.66	4

Slopestyle

Athlete	Event	Qualification				Final			
Athlete	Event	Run 1	Run 2	Best	Rank	Run 1	Run 2	Best	Rank
Chiho Takao	Women's slopestyle	10.00	8.60	10.00	22	Did not advance			

== Ice hockey ==
Japan qualified a women's team by winning a qualification tournament.

- Women's Tournament - 1 team of 21 athletes

=== Women's tournament ===
Roster

The following is the Japanese roster in the women's ice hockey tournament of the 2014 Winter Olympics.

No.	Pos.	Name	Height	Weight	Birthdate	Birthplace	2013–14 team
1	G	Azusa Nakaoku	157 cm (5 ft 2 in)	53 kg (117 lb)	17 May 1985	Yufutsu	(Japan) Toyota Cygnus (JWHL)
2	D	Shiori Koike	158 cm (5 ft 2 in)	51 kg (112 lb)	21 March 1993	Kujiramachi	(Japan) Mitsuboshi Daito Peregrine (JWHL)
3	D	Yoko Kondo	165 cm (5 ft 5 in)	60 kg (130 lb)	13 February 1979	Niida	(Japan) Seibu Princess Rabbits (JWHL)
4	D	Ayaka Toko	161 cm (5 ft 3 in)	59 kg (130 lb)	22 August 1994	Fujimi	(Japan) Daishin (JWHL)
5	D	Kanae Aoki	165 cm (5 ft 5 in)	60 kg (130 lb)	20 February 1985	Aoba	(Japan) Mitsuboshi Daito Peregrine (JWHL)
6	D	Sena Suzuki	166 cm (5 ft 5 in)	57 kg (126 lb)	4 August 1991	Sanko	(Japan) Seibu Princess Rabbits (JWHL)
7	D	Mika Hori	163 cm (5 ft 4 in)	54 kg (119 lb)	17 February 1992	Atsuma	(Japan) Toyota Cygnus (JWHL)
8	D	Tomoe Yamane	168 cm (5 ft 6 in)	70 kg (150 lb)	24 March 1986	Mihara	(Japan) Daishin (JWHL)
9	D	Aina Takeuchi	166 cm (5 ft 5 in)	63 kg (139 lb)	16 August 1991	Musa	(Japan) Daishin (JWHL)
10	F	Haruna Yoneyama	160 cm (5 ft 3 in)	55 kg (121 lb)	7 November 1991	Shizunai	(Japan) Mitsuboshi Daito Peregrine (JWHL)
11	F	Yurie Adachi	156 cm (5 ft 1 in)	51 kg (112 lb)	26 April 1985	Maruyama	(Japan) Seibu Princess Rabbits (JWHL)
12	F	Chiho Osawa	162 cm (5 ft 4 in)	63 kg (139 lb)	10 February 1992	Ojimachi	(Japan) Mitsuboshi Daito Peregrine (JWHL)
13	F	Moeko Fujimoto	155 cm (5 ft 1 in)	53 kg (117 lb)	5 August 1992	Shinkai	(Japan) Mitsuboshi Daito Peregrine (JWHL)
15	F	Rui Ukita	168 cm (5 ft 6 in)	71 kg (157 lb)	6 June 1996	Masuura	(Japan) Daishin (JWHL)
17	F	Yuka Hirano	157 cm (5 ft 2 in)	52 kg (115 lb)	26 January 1987	Yokkaichi	(Japan) Mitsuboshi Daito Peregrine (JWHL)
18	F	Tomoko Sakagami	163 cm (5 ft 4 in)	58 kg (128 lb)	18 October 1983	Sanko	(Japan) Mitsuboshi Daito Peregrine (JWHL)
21	F	Hanae Kubo	168 cm (5 ft 6 in)	63 kg (139 lb)	10 December 1982	Sanko	(Japan) Seibu Princess Rabbits (JWHL)
22	F	Miho Shishiuchi	164 cm (5 ft 5 in)	62 kg (137 lb)	21 August 1992	Kaizuka	(Japan) Kushiro Bears (JWHL)
23	F	Ami Nakamura	162 cm (5 ft 4 in)	62 kg (137 lb)	15 November 1987	Toyosakimachi	(Japan) Seibu Princess Rabbits (JWHL)
29	G	Akane Konishi	164 cm (5 ft 5 in)	62 kg (137 lb)	14 August 1995	Kushiro	(Japan) Kushiro Bears (JWHL)
30	G	Nana Fujimoto	163 cm (5 ft 4 in)	54 kg (119 lb)	3 March 1989	Sapporo	(Japan) Vortex Sapporo (JWHL)

Group stage

Team	Pld	W	OTW	OTL	L	GF	GA	GD	Pts	Qualification
Russia	3	3	0	0	0	9	3	+6	9	Quarterfinals
Sweden	3	2	0	0	1	6	3	+3	6	Quarterfinals
Germany	3	1	0	0	2	5	8	−3	3	5–8th place semifinals
Japan	3	0	0	0	3	1	7	−6	0	5–8th place semifinals

Source: IIHF

9 February 2014; 12:00	Sweden	1–0 (1–0, 0–0, 0–0)	Japan	Shayba Arena, Sochi; Attendance: 2,928

Game reference
Valentina Wallner	Goalies	Nana Fujimoto	Referee: (United States) Erin Blair; Linesmen: (France) Charlotte Girard (Czech Republic) Zuzana Svobodová
J. Asserholt (E. Eliasson, E. Grahm) (PP) – 12:38 / 1–0			Referee: (United States) Erin Blair; Linesmen: (France) Charlotte Girard (Czech Republic) Zuzana Svobodová
8 min	Penalties	4 min	Referee: (United States) Erin Blair; Linesmen: (France) Charlotte Girard (Czech Republic) Zuzana Svobodová
23	Shots	19	Referee: (United States) Erin Blair; Linesmen: (France) Charlotte Girard (Czech Republic) Zuzana Svobodová

11 February 2014; 19:00	Russia	2–1 (1–0, 0–0, 1–1)	Japan	Shayba Arena, Sochi; Attendance: 4,897

Game reference

Anna Prugova
Goalies
Nana Fujimoto
Referee:
(Germany) Nicole Hertrich
Linesmen:
(Canada) Denise Caughey
(United States) Alicia Hanrahan

T. Burina – 11:39	1–0
	1–1	40:33 – A. Toko (H. Kubo)
A. Vafina (SH) – 51:36	2–1

6 min
Penalties
6 min
38
Shots
22

13 February 2014; 12:00	Japan	0–4 (0–1, 0–1, 0–2)	Germany	Shayba Arena, Sochi; Attendance: 2,618

Game reference

Nana Fujimoto
Goalies
Viona Harrer
Referee:
(Canada) Melanie Bordeleau
Linesmen:
(Sweden) Therese Bjorkman
(France) Carlotte Girard

0–1	13:23 – M. Anwander (S. Kratzer, M. Becker) (PP)
0–2	20:48 – F. Busch (A. Lanzl)
0–3	58:31 – K. Spielberger (T. Eisenschmid, N. Kamenik)
0–4	59:28 – F. Busch (S. Gotz)

8 min
Penalties
10 min
30
Shots
25

== Luge ==
Based on the performance at the 2013–14 Luge World Cup, Japan has achieved only a single quota.

Athlete	Event	Run 1		Run 2		Run 3		Run 4		Total	
Athlete	Event	Time	Rank	Time	Rank	Time	Rank	Time	Rank	Time	Rank
Hidenari Kanayama	Men's singles	53.626	32	53.663	33	53.220	31	53.074	31	3:33.583	30

== Nordic combined ==
Athlete	Event	Ski jumping			Cross-country		Total	
Athlete	Event	Distance	Points	Rank	Time	Rank	Time	Rank
Taihei Kato	Normal hill/10 km	100.0	124.1	4	25:45.0	39	26:15.0	31
Taihei Kato	Large hill/10 km	126.5	87.6	45	DNS		DNF	
Hideaki Nagai	Normal hill/10 km	97.0	119.6	14	24:42.1	30	25:30.1	22
Hideaki Nagai	Large hill/10 km	119.0	99.3	=27	23:11.7	23	25:10.7	26
Akito Watabe	Normal hill/10 km	100.5	130.0	2	23:48.4	10	23:54.4	2nd place, silver medalist(s)
Akito Watabe	Large hill/10 km	134.0	120.8	4	23:06.0	19	23:39.0	6
Yoshito Watabe	Normal hill/10 km	100.0	124.4	10	24:22.3	25	24:58.3	15
Yoshito Watabe	Large hill/10 km	119.5	95.4	36	24:00.4	33	26:14.4	35
Yūsuke Minato; Hideaki Nagai; Akito Watabe; Yoshito Watabe	Team large hill/4×5 km	488.0	433.3	6	47:25.6	4	48:30.6	5

== Short track speed skating ==
Based on their performance at World Cup 3 & 4 in November 2013 Japan qualified 5 women and 3 men.

Men

Athlete	Event	Heat		Quarterfinal		Semifinal		Final	
Athlete	Event	Time	Rank	Time	Rank	Time	Rank	Time	Rank
Satoshi Sakashita	500 m	41.629	2 Q	59.249	3 ADV	41.661	5	Did not advance	9
Satoshi Sakashita	1500 m	2:18.298	6	—N/a		Did not advance			32
Ryosuke Sakazume	1000 m	1:26.468	3	Did not advance					22
Ryosuke Sakazume	1500 m	2:17.985	4	—N/a		Did not advance			24
Yuzo Takamido	1000 m	1:25.905	3	Did not advance					20
Yuzo Takamido	1500 m	PEN		—N/a		Did not advance			

Women

Athlete	Event	Heat		Quarterfinal		Semifinal		Final	
Athlete	Event	Time	Rank	Time	Rank	Time	Rank	Time	Rank
Ayuko Ito	500 m	44.174	3	Did not advance					19
Ayuko Ito	1000 m	1:33.188	3	Did not advance					22
Ayuko Ito	1500 m	2:30.354	3 Q	—N/a		2:56.961	7	Did not advance	18
Yui Sakai	500 m	45.051	3	Did not advance					22
Yui Sakai	1000 m	1:29.824	2 Q	1:29.328	4	Did not advance			13
Yui Sakai	1500 m	2:27.198	5	—N/a		Did not advance			27
Biba Sakurai	500 m	44.628	4	Did not advance					27
Biba Sakurai	1500 m	2:28.127	6	—N/a		Did not advance			33
Sayuri Shimizu	1000 m	1:31.879	4	Did not advance					25
Ayuko Ito; Moemi Kikuchi; Yui Sakai; Biba Sakurai; Sayuri Shimizu	3000 m relay	—N/a				4:11.913	3 FB	4:15.253	5

Qualification legend: ADV – Advanced due to being impeded by another skater; FA – Qualify to medal round; FB – Qualify to consolation round

== Skeleton ==
Athlete	Event	Run 1		Run 2		Run 3		Run 4		Total	
Athlete	Event	Time	Rank	Time	Rank	Time	Rank	Time	Rank	Time	Rank
Yuki Sasahara	Men's	58.22	24	58.07	21	57.91	21	Did not advance		2:54.20	22
Hiroatsu Takahashi	Men's	57.53	14	57.10	13	57.13	11	56.98	12	3:48.74	12
Nozomi Komuro	Women's	59.94	18	59.82	19	59.24	19	58.76	18	3:57.76	19

== Ski jumping ==
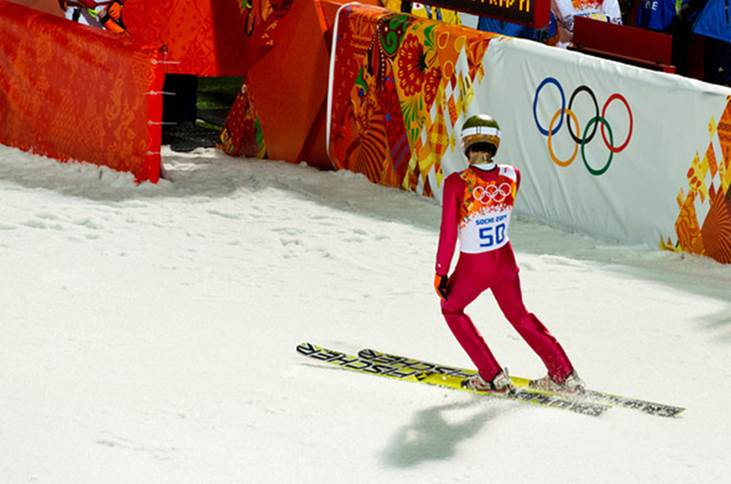
Taku Takeuchi after his jump in the normal hill competition.

Japan has received the following start quotas:

Men

Athlete	Event	Qualification			First round			Final			Total	
Athlete	Event	Distance	Points	Rank	Distance	Points	Rank	Distance	Points	Rank	Points	Rank
Daiki Ito	Large hill	130.5	122.0	2 Q	137.5	128.1	8 Q	124.0	124.4	14	252.5	9
Noriaki Kasai	Normal hill	BYE			101.5	131.2	8 Q	100.0	124.6	11	255.8	7
Noriaki Kasai	Large hill	BYE			139.0	140.6	2 Q	133.5	136.8	3	277.4	2nd place, silver medalist(s)
Reruhi Shimizu	Normal hill	101.5	126.2	3 Q	99.5	122.2	25 Q	99.5	124.2	14	246.4	18
Reruhi Shimizu	Large hill	130.5	120.4	3 Q	130.0	122.2	15 Q	134.5	130.0	8	252.2	10
Taku Takeuchi	Normal hill	97.5	119.1	7 Q	98.0	123.1	21 Q	95.5	116.3	24	239.4	24
Taku Takeuchi	Large hill	127.0	116.0	6 Q	132.5	126.7	10 Q	122.5	122.6	18	249.3	13
Yuta Watase	Normal hill	95.0	113.5	20 Q	99.5	123.0	22 Q	97.0	120.0	20	243.0	21
Daiki Ito; Noriaki Kasai; Reruhi Shimizu; Taku Takeuchi	Team large hill	—N/a			524.0	507.5	3 Q	527.5	517.4	4	1024.9	3rd place, bronze medalist(s)

Women

Athlete	Event	First round			Final			Total	
Athlete	Event	Distance	Points	Rank	Distance	Points	Rank	Points	Rank
Yuki Ito	Normal hill	97.5	117.4	10	101.0	124.4	2	241.8	7
Sara Takanashi	Normal hill	100.0	124.1	3	98.5	118.9	9	243.0	4
Yurina Yamada	Normal hill	78.0	73.3	30	64.5	42.4	30	115.7	30

== Snowboarding ==
Alpine

Athlete	Event	Qualification		Round of 16	Quarterfinal	Semifinal	Final	
Athlete	Event	Time	Rank	Opposition Time	Opposition Time	Opposition Time	Opposition Time	Rank
Tomoka Takeuchi	Women's giant slalom	1:46.33	1 Q	Boccacini (ITA); W −1.93	Calvé (CAN); W −4.00	Meschik (AUT); W DSQ	Kummer (SUI); L +7.32	2nd place, silver medalist(s)
Tomoka Takeuchi	Women's slalom	1:05.41	13 Q	Zogg (SUI); L DSQ	Did not advance			

Freestyle

Athlete	Event	Qualification				Semifinal				Final			
Athlete	Event	Run 1	Run 2	Best	Rank	Run 1	Run 2	Best	Rank	Run 1	Run 2	Best	Rank
Ryo Aono	Men's halfpipe	37.50	13.00	37.50	19	Did not advance							
Ayumu Hirano	Men's halfpipe	92.25	64.75	92.25	1 QF	Bye				90.75	93.50	93.50	2nd place, silver medalist(s)
Taku Hiraoka	Men's halfpipe	92.25	63.50	92.25	2 QF	Bye				45.50	92.25	92.25	3rd place, bronze medalist(s)
Ayumu Nedefuji	Men's halfpipe	54.50	28.75	54.50	17	Did not advance							
Rana Okada	Women's halfpipe	66.00	69.75	69.75	7 QS	58.50	70.00	70.00	6 QF	47.75	85.50	85.50	5
Yuki Kadono	Men's slopestyle	31.00	16.50	31.00	13 QS	84.75	80.50	84.75	4 QF	53.00	75.75	75.75	8

Qualification Legend: QF – Qualify directly to final; QS – Qualify to semifinal

Snowboard cross

Athlete	Event	Seeding		Quarterfinal	Semifinal	Final	
Athlete	Event	Time	Rank	Position	Position	Position	Rank
Yuka Fujimori	Women's snowboard cross	1:23.22	6	6	Did not advance		22

Qualification legend: FA – Qualify to medal round; FB – Qualify to consolation round

== Speed skating ==
Based on the results from the fall World Cups during the 2013–14 ISU Speed Skating World Cup season, Japan has earned the following start quotas:

Men

Athlete	Event	Race 1		Race 2		Final	
Athlete	Event	Time	Rank	Time	Rank	Time	Rank
Yuji Kamijo	500 m	35.37	21	35.48	24	70.85	20
Joji Kato	500 m	34.96	5	34.77	4	69.74	5
Taro Kondo	1000 m	—N/a				1:11.44	35
Taro Kondo	1500 m	—N/a				1:49.31	29
Keiichiro Nagashima	500 m	34.79	3	35.25	16	70.04	6
Yūya Oikawa	500 m	35.24	17	35.22	14	70.46	15
Shane Williamson	5000 m	—N/a				6:42.88	26
Daichi Yamanaka	1000 m	—N/a				1:11.93	36

Women

Athlete	Event	Race 1		Race 2		Final	
Athlete	Event	Time	Rank	Time	Rank	Time	Rank
Shoko Fujimura	3000 m	—N/a				4:12.71	15
Shoko Fujimura	5000 m	—N/a				7:09.65	10
Masako Hozumi	3000 m	—N/a				4:15.52	21
Masako Hozumi	5000 m	—N/a				7:12.42	13
Shiho Ishizawa	3000 m	—N/a				4:09.39	9
Shiho Ishizawa	5000 m	—N/a				7:11.54	12
Ayaka Kikuchi	1500 m	—N/a				2:01.29	31
Nao Kodaira	500 m	37.88	7	37.72	4	75.61	5
Nao Kodaira	1000 m	—N/a				1:16.45	13
Misaki Oshigiri	1500 m	—N/a				2:00.03	22
Miyako Sumiyoshi	500 m	38.644	13	38.62	13	77.26	14
Miyako Sumiyoshi	1000 m	—N/a				1:17.68	22
Maki Tabata	1500 m	—N/a				2:00.64	25
Nana Takagi	1500 m	—N/a				2:02.16	32
Maki Tsuji	500 m	38.4	10	38.44	11	76.84	9
Maki Tsuji	1000 m	—N/a				1:18.07	27

Team pursuit

Athlete	Event	Quarterfinal	Semifinal	Final	
Athlete	Event	Opposition Time	Opposition Time	Opposition Time	Rank
Ayaka Kikuchi; Misaki Oshigiri; Maki Tabata; Nana Takagi	Women's team pursuit	South Korea; W 3:03.99	Netherlands; L 3:10.19	Russia; L 3:02.57	4

== See also ==
- Japan at the 2014 Summer Youth Olympics
- Japan at the 2014 Winter Paralympics
