= 2011 World Sprint Speed Skating Championships =

Speed skating event held on 22 and 23 January 2011

World Sprint Speed Skating Championships
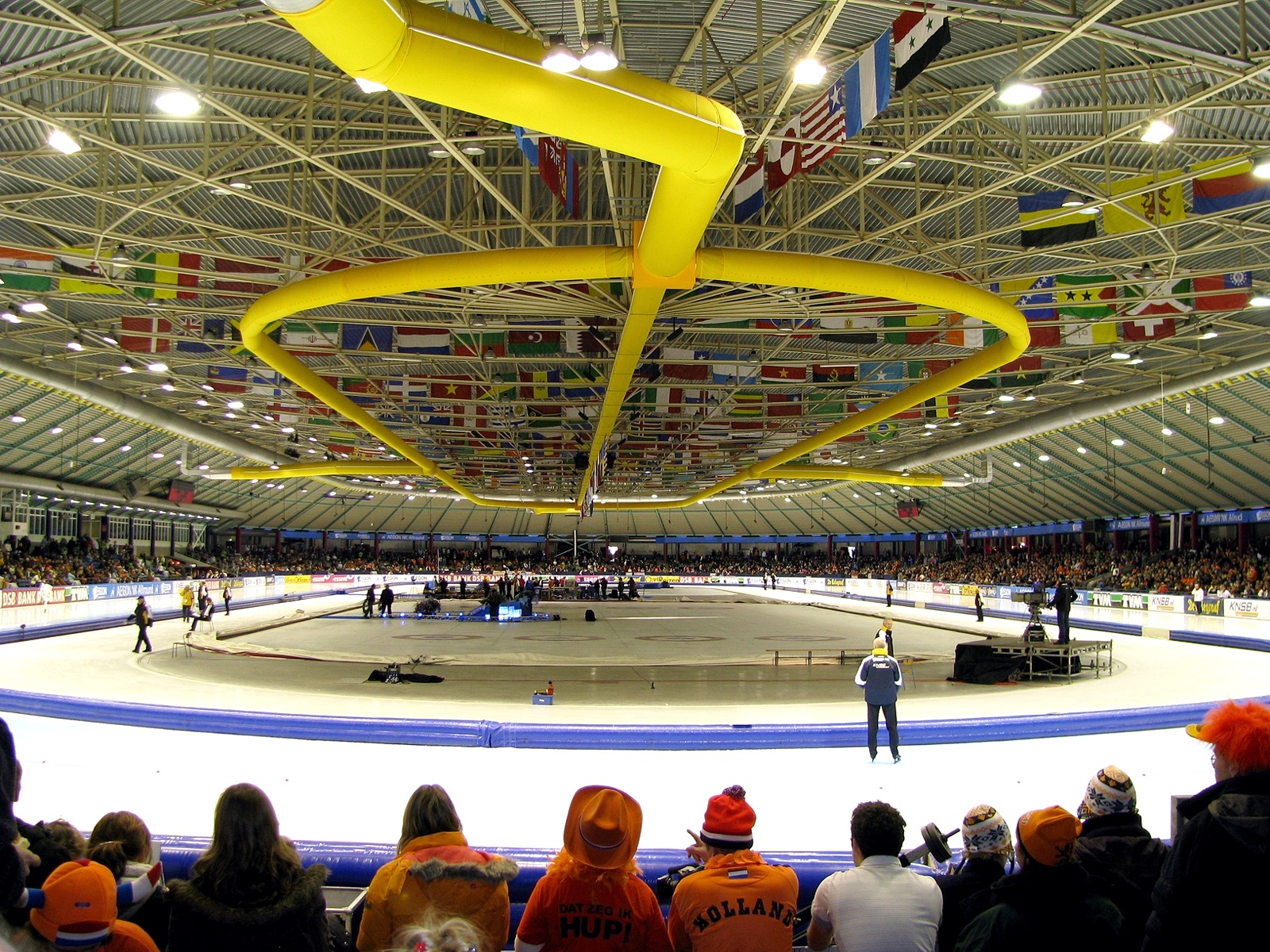
- Thialf (Heerenveen)
- Venue: Thialf (Heerenveen)
- Dates: 22 and 23 January 2011
- Competitors: 43 men 29 women

Medalist men
1st place, gold medalist(s)		Lee Kyou-hyuk	KOR
2nd place, silver medalist(s)		Mo Tae-bum	KOR
3rd place, bronze medalist(s)		Shani Davis	USA

Medalist women
1st place, gold medalist(s)		Christine Nesbitt	CAN
2nd place, silver medalist(s)		Annette Gerritsen	NED
3rd place, bronze medalist(s)		Margot Boer	NED

The 2011 World Sprint Speed Skating Championships were a long track speed skating event held on 22 and 23 January 2011 in Thialf, Heerenveen, Netherlands.

== Rules ==
All participating skaters are allowed to skate the two 500 meters and one 1000 meters; 24 skaters may take part on the second 1000 meters. These 24 skaters are determined by the samalog standings after the three skated distances, and comparing these lists as follows:

1. Skaters among the top 24 on both lists are qualified.
2. To make up a total of 24, skaters are then added in order of their best rank on either list.

== Results ==
=== Men's championships ===
Rank	Name	Nation	500 m (1)	1000 m (1)	500 m (2)	1000 m (2)	Total	Behind
1st place, gold medalist(s)	Lee Kyou-hyuk	South Korea	34.92	1:09.65	34.77	1:09.48	139.255	
2nd place, silver medalist(s)	Mo Tae-bum	South Korea	35.19	1:09.38	35.01	1:08.95	139.365	+0.11
3rd place, bronze medalist(s)	Shani Davis	United States	35.25	1:09.14	35.40	1:08.76	139.600	+0.35
4	Stefan Groothuis	Netherlands	35.21	1:08.97	35.56	1:08.82	139.665	+0.41
5	Kjeld Nuis	Netherlands	35.48	1:09.88	35.68	1:09.09	140.645	+1.39
6	Jamie Gregg	Canada	35.53	1:10.05	35.10	1:09.99	140.650	+1.40
7	Denny Morrison	Canada	35.97	1:09.88	35.86	1:09.14	141.340	+2.09
8	Mun Jun	South Korea	35.42	1:10.64	35.39	1:10.70	141.480	+2.23
9	Aleksey Yesin	Russia	35.74	1:10.06	35.73	1:10.07	141.535	+2.28
10	Nico Ihle	Germany	35.35	1:10.37	35.61	1:10.83	141.560	+2.31
11	Dmitry Lobkov	Russia	35.51	1:10.59	35.46	1:10.76	141.645	+2.39
12	Jan Bos	Netherlands	35.71	1:10.49	35.84	1:09.80	141.695	+2.44
13	Jan Smeekens	Netherlands	35.71	1:11.31	34.99	1:10.81	141.760	+2.51
14	Pekka Koskela	Finland	35.92	1:11.12	35.32	1:11.38	142.490	+3.24
15	Ryohei Haga	Japan	35.27	1:11.41	35.42	1:12.27	142.530	+3.28
16	Tucker Fredricks	United States	35.58	1:11.84	35.11	1:11.92	142.570	+3.32
17	Daniel Greig	Australia	35.99	1:10.58	35.71	1:11.39	142.685	+3.43
18	Akio Ota	Japan	35.55	1:12.13	35.03	1:12.15	142.720	+3.47
19	Christoffer Fagerli Rukke	Norway	36.20	1:10.46	36.09	1:10.57	142.805	+3.55
20	Ermanno Ioriatti	Italy	35.81	1:11.62	35.56	1:11.28	142.820	+3.57
21	Håvard Bøkko	Norway	36.50	1:10.80	36.21	1:10.17	143.195	+3.94
22	Denis Kuzin	Kazakhstan	36.62	1:10.90	36.26	1:10.32	143.490	+4.24
23	Konrad Niedźwiedzki	Poland	36.02	1:11.10	36.31	1:11.30	143.530	+4.28
24	Joel Eriksson	Sweden	36.46	1:11.03	36.69	1:11.01	144.170	+4.92
NQ25	Joey Lindsey	United States	35.80	1:11.25	35.67			
NQ26	Roman Krech	Kazakhstan	35.79	1:11.68	35.60			
NQ27	Takaharu Nakajima	Japan	35.87	1:11.30	35.96			
NQ28	Sergey Chadayev	Russia	35.96	1:11.50	36.03			
NQ29	Yuji Kamijo	Japan	35.78	1:12.96	35.73			
NQ30	Samuel Schwarz	Germany	36.12	1:11.56	36.20			
NQ31	Denny Ihle	Germany	35.80	1:12.76	36.29			
NQ32	Wang Nan	China	36.08	1:13.00	36.02			
NQ33	Matteo Anesi	Australia	36.64	1:12.06	36.97			
NQ34	Artur Waś	Poland	36.39	1:13.74	36.48			
NQ35	Haralds Silovs	Latvia	37.10	1:12.00	36.76			
NQ36	Philip Brojaka	United Kingdom	37.04	1:13.98	37.24			
NQ37	Marius Paraschivoiu	Romania	37.38	1:14.27	36.80			
NQ38	Vitaly Mikhailov	Belarus	37.39	1:12.93	37.62			
NQ39	Mika Poutala	Finland	35.52	1:12.06	47.07			
NQ40	Even Johansen	Norway	1:08.83	1:11.37	36.41			
NQ41	Pascal Briand	France	38.06	1:14.34				
NQ42	Nan Minghao	China	36.91					
NQ43	Zhang Yaolin	China	36.93					

NQ = Not qualified for the second 1000 m (only the best 24 are qualified)
DQ = Disqualified

=== Women's championships ===
Rank	Name	Nation	500 m (1)	1000 m (1)	500 m (2)	1000 m (2)	Total	Behind
1st place, gold medalist(s)	Christine Nesbitt	Canada	38.57	1.15.01	38.45	1.15.39	152.220	
2nd place, silver medalist(s)	Annette Gerritsen	Netherlands	38.53	1.16.89	38.47	1.17.14	154.015	+1.80
3rd place, bronze medalist(s)	Margot Boer	Netherlands	38.28	1.17.47	38.44	1.17.14	154.025	+1.81
4	Heather Richardson	United States	38.51	1.17.46	38.46	1.16.67	154.035	+1.82
5	Nao Kodaira	Japan	38.28	1.17.40	38.80	1.17.25	154.405	+2.19
6	Laurine van Riessen	Netherlands	38.93	1.17.23	38.62	1.16.61	154.470	+2.25
7	Ireen Wüst	Netherlands	39.08	1.16.49	39.21	1.15.93	154.500	+2.28
8	Jenny Wolf	Germany	38.21	1.17.36	38.33	1.19.07	154.755	+2.54
9	Zhang Hong	China	38.86	1.17.96	38.96	1.18.29	155.915	+3.70
10	Maki Tsuji	Japan	38.78	1.18.56	38.89	1.18.13	156.015	+3.80
11	Judith Hesse	Germany	38.93	1.18.33	39.02	1.17.98	156.105	+3.89
12	Yekaterina Aydova	Kazakhstan	39.40	1.18.13	39.17	1.17.17	156.220	+4.00
13	Shannon Rempel	Canada	39.12	1.18.20	39.11	1.17.81	156.235	+4.02
14	Jin Peiyu	China	38.94	1.18.86	38.79	1.18.82	156.570	+4.35
15	Yekaterina Lobysheva	Russia	39.35	1.18.28	39.44	1.17.72	156.790	+4.57
16	Lee Bo-ra	South Korea	39.14	1.19.59	38.94	1.18.75	157.250	+5.03
17	Chiara Simionato	Italy	39.26	1.19.07	39.65	1.18.53	157.710	+5.49
18	Olga Fatkulina	Russia	39.38	1.19.37	39.38	1.18.81	157.850	+5.63
19	Miho Takagi	Japan	39.61	1.18.39	39.68	1.18.99	157.980	+5.76
20	Gabriele Hirschbichler	Germany	39.79	1.18.75	39.72	1.18.38	158.075	+5.86
21	Qi Shuai	China	39.00	1.20.92	39.18	1.19.59	158.435	+6.22
22	Alla Shabanova	Russia	39.78	1.19.18	39.68	1.18.93	158.515	+6.30
23	Hege Bøkko	Norway	40.070	1.18.56	40.28	1.19.20	159.230	+7.01
NC24	Russia	Jekaterina Sjichova	39,84 (24)	1.17,56 (9)	39,59 (20)	DSQ	118,210	
NQ25	South Korea	Kim Hyun-yung	40,58 (29)	1.19,83 (24)	40,00 (25)		120,495	
NQ26	China	Li Dan	39,54 (20)	1.23,61 (29)	39,55 (19)		120,895	
NQ27	Italy	Yvonne Daldossi	40,14 (26)	1.21,62 (27)	40,17 (26)		121,120	
NQ28	Japan	Yuki Matsuda	40,51 (28)	1.20,17 (25)	40,72 (29)		121,315	
NQ29	Belarus	Anna Badajeva	40,28 (27)	1.23,11 (28)	40,43 (28)		122,265	

NQ = Not qualified for the second 1000 m (only the best 24 are qualified)
DQ = Disqualified
