= Speed skating at the 2014 Winter Olympics – Women's 1000 metres =

Women's 1000 metres at the XXII Olympic Winter Games
- Venue: Adler Arena Skating Center
- Date: 13 February 2014
- Competitors: 36 from 13 nations

Medalists
1st place, gold medalist(s)		Zhang Hong	China
2nd place, silver medalist(s)		Ireen Wüst	Netherlands
3rd place, bronze medalist(s)		Margot Boer	Netherlands

The women's 1000 metres speed skating competition of the 2014 Sochi Olympics was held at Adler Arena Skating Center on 13 February 2014.

== Qualification ==
A total of thirty-six speed skaters could qualify for this distance, with a maximum of four skaters per country. The top 20 of the 2013–14 ISU Speed Skating World Cup – Women's 1000 metres standings after the fourth World Cup race in Berlin secured a spot for their country. Then the additional 16 spots were awarded based on a time ranking of all times skated in the World Cup and the 2014 World Sprint Speed Skating Championships. A reserve list was also made.

== Records ==
Prior to this competition, the existing world and Olympic records were as follows.

World record	Brittany Bowe (USA)	1:12.58	Salt Lake City, United States	17 November 2013
Olympic record	Chris Witty (USA)	1:13.83	Salt Lake City, United States	17 February 2002

At the 2013 World Single Distance Speed Skating Championships the track record was set by Olga Fatkulina at 1:15.44.

The following record was set during this competition.

Date	Round	Athlete	Country	Time	Record
13 February	Pair 7	Zhang Hong	China	1:14.02	TR

TR = track record

== Results ==
The race was started at 18:00.

On 24 November 2017, Russian athlete Olga Fatkulina was disqualified for a doping offence. In January 2018, she successfully appealed against the disqualification at the court of arbitration for sport.

Rank	Pair	Lane	Name	Country	Time	Time behind	Notes
1st place, gold medalist(s)	7	I	Zhang Hong	China	1:14.02	—	TR
2nd place, silver medalist(s)	17	I	Ireen Wüst	Netherlands	1:14.69	+0.67	
3rd place, bronze medalist(s)	16	I	Margot Boer	Netherlands	1:14.90	+0.88	
4	16	O	Olga Fatkulina	Russia	1:15.08	+1.06	
5	18	I	Lotte van Beek	Netherlands	1:15.10	+1.08	
6	14	I	Marrit Leenstra	Netherlands	1:15.15	+1.13	
7	15	I	Heather Richardson	United States	1:15.23	+1.21	
8	17	O	Brittany Bowe	United States	1:15.47	+1.45	
9	7	O	Christine Nesbitt	Canada	1:15.62	+1.60	
10	12	O	Karolína Erbanová	Czech Republic	1:15.74	+1.72	
11	10	O	Judith Hesse	Germany	1:15.84	+1.82	
12	18	O	Lee Sang-hwa	South Korea	1:15.94	+1.92	
13	15	O	Nao Kodaira	Japan	1:16.45	+2.43	
14	12	I	Wang Beixing	China	1:16.59	+2.57	
15	10	I	Yekaterina Shikhova	Russia	1:17.01	+2.99	
16	11	O	Yuliya Skokova	Russia	1:17.02	+3.00	
17	1	O	Ida Njåtun	Norway	1:17.15	+3.13	
18	13	O	Kaylin Irvine	Canada	1:17.24	+3.22	
19	14	O	Yekaterina Aydova	Kazakhstan	1:17.25	+3.23	
20	9	I	Yekaterina Lobysheva	Russia	1:17.31	+3.29	
21	3	O	Kali Christ	Canada	1:17.41	+3.39	
22	5	I	Miyako Sumiyoshi	Japan	1:17.68	+3.66	
23	2	I	Natalia Czerwonka	Poland	1:17.933	+3.91	
24	9	O	Vanessa Bittner	Austria	1:17.937	+3.91	
25	3	I	Jenny Wolf	Germany	1:17.99	+3.97	
26	11	I	Gabriele Hirschbichler	Germany	1:18.00	+3.98	
27	1	I	Maki Tsuji	Japan	1:18.07	+4.05	
28	8	O	Kim Hyun-Yung	South Korea	1:18.10	+4.08	
29	8	I	Luiza Złotkowska	Poland	1:18.38	+4.36	
30	6	O	Brittany Schussler	Canada	1:18.53	+4.51	
31	4	O	Park Seung-Ju	South Korea	1:18.94	+4.92	
32	2	O	Sugar Todd	United States	1:19.13	+5.11	
33	4	I	Kelly Gunther	United States	1:19.43	+5.41	
34	5	O	Li Dan	China	1:20.20	+6.18	
35	6	I	Lee Bo-ra	South Korea	1:57.49	+43.47	
	13	I	Monique Angermüller	Germany	DQ		

TR = track record, DQ = disqualified
