= 2011 World Championships =

2011 World Championships may refer to:

- Alpine skiing:
  - Alpine World Ski Championships 2011
  - 2011 IPC Alpine Skiing World Championships
- Aquatics: 2011 World Aquatics Championships
- Athletics: 2011 World Championships in Athletics
  - Cross-country running: 2011 IAAF World Cross Country Championships
- Athletics: 2011 IPC Athletics World Championships
- Badminton: 2011 BWF World Championships
- Boxing: 2011 World Amateur Boxing Championships
- Curling:
  - 2011 Ford World Men's Curling Championship
  - 2011 Capital One World Women's Curling Championship
  - 2011 World Mixed Doubles Curling Championship
- Darts: 2011 BDO World Darts Championship
- Darts: 2011 PDC World Darts Championship
- Fencing: 2011 World Fencing Championships
- Figure skating: 2011 World Figure Skating Championships
- Gymnastics
  - Artistic Gymnastics 2011 World Artistic Gymnastics Championships
  - Rhythmic Gymnastics 2011 World Rhythmic Gymnastics Championships
- Freestyle skiing: FIS Freestyle World Ski Championships 2011
- Handball:
  - 2011 World Men's Handball Championship
  - 2011 World Women's Handball Championship
- Ice hockey: 2011 Men's World Ice Hockey Championships
- Ice hockey: 2011 Women's World Ice Hockey Championships
- Netball: 2011 World Netball Championships
- Nordic skiing: FIS Nordic World Ski Championships 2011
- Speed skating
  - Allround: 2011 World Allround Speed Skating Championships
  - Sprint: 2011 World Sprint Speed Skating Championships
  - Single distances: 2011 World Single Distance Speed Skating Championships
- Snooker: 2011 World Snooker Championship
- Table tennis: 2011 World Table Tennis Championships

== See also ==
- 2011 World Cup (disambiguation)
