= 2013 World Sprint Speed Skating Championships =

International speed skating competition

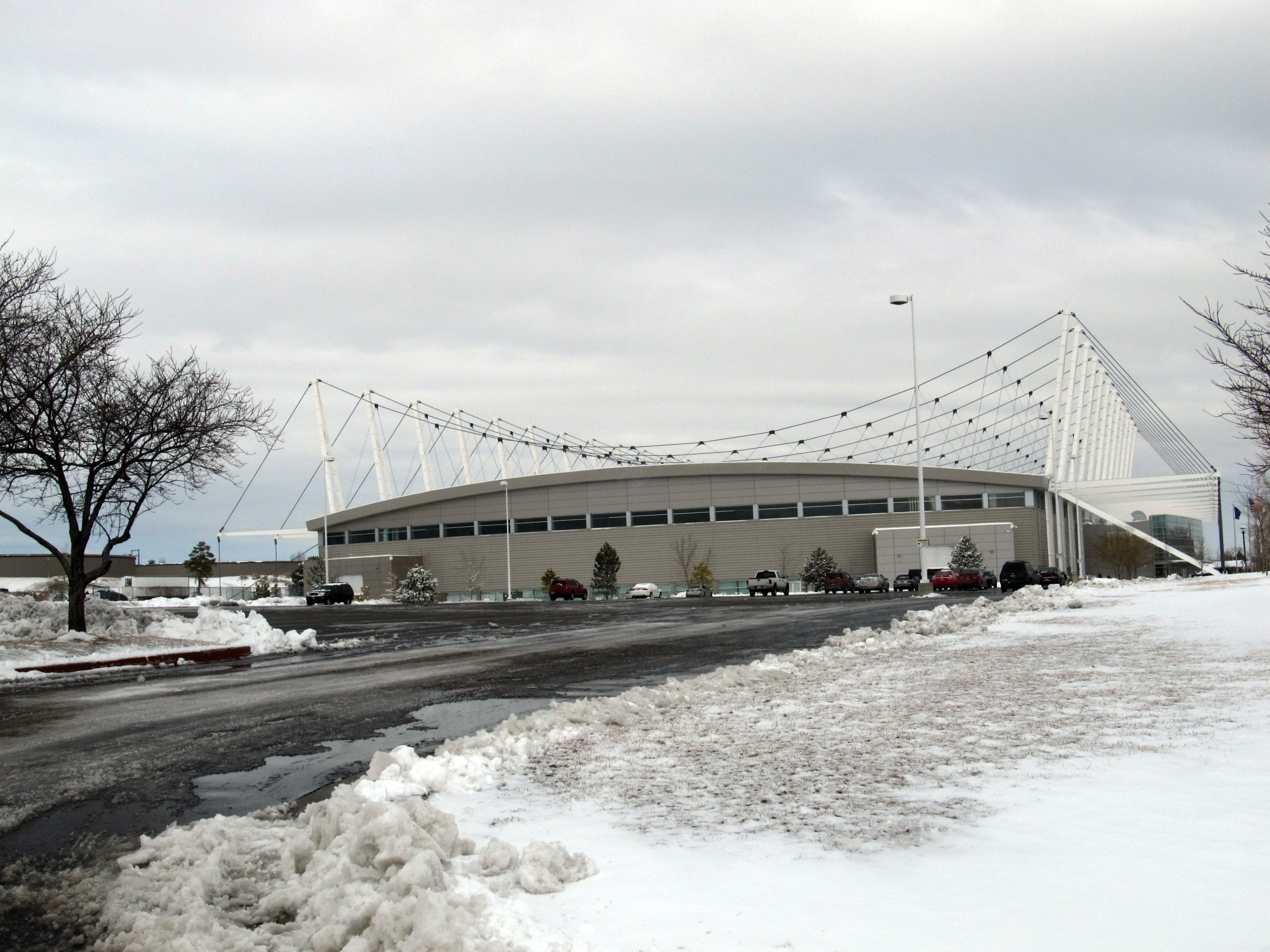
- Utah Olympic Oval (Salt Lake City)
- Venue: Utah Olympic Oval (Salt Lake City)
- Dates: January 26–27, 2013

Medalist men
1st place, gold medalist(s)		Michel Mulder	Netherlands
2nd place, silver medalist(s)		Pekka Koskela	Finland
3rd place, bronze medalist(s)		Hein Otterspeer	Netherlands

Medalist women
1st place, gold medalist(s)		Heather Richardson	United States
2nd place, silver medalist(s)		Yu Jing	China
3rd place, bronze medalist(s)		Lee Sang-hwa	South Korea

The 2013 World Sprint Speed Skating Championships is a long track speed skating event that was held on January 26–27, 2013, in the Utah Olympic Oval, in Salt Lake City, United States.

== Rules ==
All participating skaters are allowed to skate the two 500 meters and one 1000 meters; 24 skaters may take part on the second 1000 meters. These 24 skaters are determined by the samalog standings after the three skated distances, and comparing these lists as follows:

1. Skaters among the top 24 on both lists are qualified.
2. To make up a total of 24, skaters are then added in order of their best rank on either list.

== Men championships ==
=== Sprint results ===
Rank	Name	Nation	500 m (1)	1000 m (1)	500 m (2)	1000 m (2)	Total	Behind
1st place, gold medalist(s)	Michel Mulder	Netherlands	34.47	1:07.49	34.75	1:07.65	136.790WR	
2nd place, silver medalist(s)	Pekka Koskela	Finland	34.44	1:07.92	34.63	1:07.97	137.015	+0.23
3rd place, bronze medalist(s)	Hein Otterspeer	Netherlands	34.79	1:07.46	34.81	1:07.43	137.045	+0.26
4	Jamie Gregg	Canada	34.43	1:08.41	34.50	1:07.85	137.060	+0.27
5	Mo Tae-bum	South Korea	34.60	1:08.27	34.72	1:07.91	137.410	+0.62
6	Lee Kyou-hyuk	South Korea	34.70	1:07.87	34.73	1:08.23	137.480	+0.69
7	Mika Poutala	Finland	34.62	1:08.53	34.54	1:08.28	137.575	+0.79
8	Dmitry Lobkov	Russia	34.62	1:08.25	34.60	1:08.55	137.620	+0.83
9	Aleksey Yesin	Russia	35.10	1:08.12	34.75	1:08.02	137.920	+1.13
10	Nico Ihle	Germany	34.87	1:08.63	34.64	1:08.24	137.945	+1.16
11	Samuel Schwarz	Germany	35.19	1:07.86	34.93	1:08.13	138.115	+1.33
12	Mitchell Whitmore	United States	34.76	1:08.45	34.63	1:09.04	138.135	+1.35
13	Laurent Dubreuil	Canada	34.71	1:08.63	34.83	1:08.64	138.175	+1.39
14	Gilmore Junio	Canada	34.58	1:08.42	34.53	1:09.75	138.195	+1.41
15	Tyler Derraugh	Canada	35.06	1:08.15	35.01	1:08.15	138.220	+1.43
16	Denis Koval	Russia	34.60	1:09.25	34.56	1:09.29	138.430	+1.64
17	Stefan Groothuis	Netherlands	34.82	1:07.80	35.28	1:08.91	138.455	+1.67
18	Haralds Silovs	Latvia	35.60	1:07.47	35.32	1:07.72	138.515	+1.73
19	Mirko Giacomo Nenzi	Italy	35.04	1:08.67	34.99	1:08.55	138.640	+1.85
20	Ryohei Haga	Japan	34.43	1:08.88	34.62	1:10.33	138.655	+1.87
21	Keiichiro Nagashima	Japan	34.59	1:08.99	34.70	1:09.86	138.715	+1.93
22	Joji Kato	Japan	34.21	1:11.29	34.29	1:10.16	139.225	+2.44
23	Artur Waś	Poland	34.78	1:09.80	34.61	1:10.39	139.485	+2.70
24	Benjamin Macé	France	35.87	1:08.28	35.59	1:08.13	139.665	+2.88
NQ25	Espen Aarnes Hvammen	Norway	35.04	1:08.90	34.73			
NQ26	Daniel Greig	Australia	34.64	1:09.12	35.13			
NQ27	Jonathan Garcia	United States	35.37	1:08.94	35.56			
NQ28	Fyodor Mezentsev	Kazakhstan	35.49	1:09.26	35.50			
NQ29	Christoffer Fagerli Rukke	Norway	35.83	1:09.09	35.44			
NQ30	Kim Yeong-Ho	South Korea	35.50	1:09.50	35.63			
NQ31	Sergey Chadayev	Russia	35.54	1:10.82	35.13			
NQ32	Aleksandr Zhigin	Kazakhstan	35.94	1:09.72	35.76			
NQ33	Ermanno Ioriatti	Italy	35.58	1:11.69	35.59			
NQ34	Marius Paraschivoiu	Romania	37.53	1:15.61	37.10			
NQ35	Bram Smallenbroek	Austria	37.04	1:11.22				
NQ36	Mark Tuitert	Netherlands	DNF	DNF				

NQ = Not qualified for the second 1000 m (only the best 24 are qualified)
DQ = disqualified

== Women championships ==
=== Sprint results ===
Rank	Name	Nation	500 m (1)	1000 m (1)	500 m (2)	1000 m (2)	Total	Behind
1st place, gold medalist(s)	Heather Richardson	United States	37.31	1:13.74	37.24	1:13.19	148.015	
2nd place, silver medalist(s)	Yu Jing	China	37.21	1:13.93	37.28	1:13.65	148.280	+0.27
3rd place, bronze medalist(s)	Lee Sang-hwa	South Korea	37.28	1:14.39	36.99	1:14.19	148.560	+0.55
4	Thijsje Oenema	Netherlands	37.38	1:14.22	37.06	1:14.23	148.665	+0.65
5	Christine Nesbitt	Canada	38.02	1:12.91	37.83	1:13.28	148.945	+0.93
6	Zhang Hong	China	38.09	1:13.93	37.69	1:13.64	149.565	+1.55
7	Margot Boer	Netherlands	37.64	1:14.25	37.82	1:14.17	149.670	+1.66
8	Brittany Bowe	United States	38.03	1:13.68	37.90	1:13.83	149.685	+1.67
9	Olga Fatkulina	Russia	37.71	1:13.92	37.93	1:14.20	149.700	+1.69
10	Wang Beixing	China	37.51	1:14.80	37.23	1:15.12	149.700	+1.69
11	Marrit Leenstra	Netherlands	38.24	1:14.36	38.02	1:13.88	150.380	+2.37
12	Yekaterina Lobysheva	Russia	37.89	1:14.38	37.98	1:14.85	150.485	+2.47
13	Miyako Sumiyoshi	Japan	38.00	1:15.72	37.49	1:14.66	150.680	+2.67
14	Laurine van Riessen	Netherlands	38.16	1:15.44	37.98	1:15.10	151.410	+3.40
15	Judith Hesse	Germany	38.24	1:15.38	37.83	1:15.50	151.510	+3.50
16	Yekaterina Aydova	Kazakhstan	38.23	1:14.95	38.05	1:15.53	151.520	+3.51
17	Anastasia Bucsis	Canada	38.07	1:15.58	37.91	1:16.09	151.815	+3.80
18	Maki Tsuji	Japan	38.09	1:17.13	37.92	1:17.55	153.350	+5.34
19	Svetlana Radkevich	Belarus	38.59	1:17.11	38.47	1:16.61	153.920	+5.91
20	Jennifer Plate	Germany	38.19	1:17.15	38.34	1:17.72	153.965	+5.95
21	Yuliya Liteykina	Russia	38.64	1:17.51	38.40	1:17.37	154.480	+6.47
22	Nao Kodaira	Japan	37.57	1:14.85	37.54	1:53.32	169.195	+21.18
23	Jenny Wolf	Germany	37.53	1:16.68	37.28	2:06.93	176.615	+28.60
DQ24	Karolína Erbanová	Czech Republic	38.11	1:13.84	37.67	DQ		
NQ25	Sugar Todd	United States	38.68	1:17.39	38.46			
NQ26	Kim Hyun-yung	South Korea	39.04	1:17.34	38.38			
NQ27	Yvonne Daldossi	Italy	38.74	1:17.92	38.69			
NQ28	Qi Shuai	China	39.04	1:17.50	38.83			
NQ29	Vanessa Bittner	Austria	39.40	1:18.93	39.51			
NQ30	Elina Risku	Finland	39.59	1:19.05	39.35			
NQ31	Hanne Haugland	Norway	40.03	1:19.48	39.75			
NQ32	Ágota Tóth-Lykovcán	Hungary	40.31	1:19.54	39.67			
NQ33	Johanna Östlund	Sweden	40.68	1:19.75	40.28			

NQ = Not qualified for the second 1000 m (only the best 24 are qualified)
DQ = disqualified
