= Park Seung-ju =

South Korean speed-skater (born 1990)

Personal information
- Born: September 15, 1990 (age 35) Seoul, South Korea
- Height: 5 ft 3 in (160 cm)
- Weight: 112 lb (51 kg)

Korean name
- Hangul: 박승주
- RR: Bak Seungju
- MR: Pak Sŭngju

Sport
- Country: South Korea
- Sport: Speed skating

Achievements and titles
- Highest world ranking: 38 (1000 m)

Park Seung-ju (Korean: 박승주; born September 15, 1990, in Seoul) is a South Korean speed-skater.

Park competed at the 2014 Winter Olympics for South Korea. In the 500 metres she finished 26th overall, and in the 1000 metres she was 31st.

As of September 2014, Park's best performance at the World Single Distance Speed Skating Championships is 20th, in the 2013 1000m. Her best performance at the World Sprint Speed Skating Championships is 16th, in 2014. Park also won a silver medal at the 2007 World Junior Speed Skating Championships.

Park made her World Cup debut in November 2012. As of September 2014, Park's top World Cup finish is 20th in a 1000m race at Harbin in 2012–13. Her best overall finish in the World Cup is 38th, in the 2012–13 1000m.

Her sister Park Seung-hi and her brother Park Se-yeong are short track speed skaters.

== Education ==
- Dankook University
- Seongnam Seohyun High School
