= 2011 World Cup =

2011 World Cup may refer to:

- 2011 Cricket World Cup
- 2011 Baseball World Cup
- 2011 Rugby World Cup
- 2011 IFAF World Cup - American Football
- 2011 World Cup (snooker)
- 2011 World Cup (men's golf)
- Chess World Cup 2011

== Football (soccer) ==
- Women: 2011 FIFA Women's World Cup
- Youth: 2011 FIFA U-20 World Cup
- Junior: 2011 FIFA U-17 World Cup
- Club: 2011 FIFA Club World Cup
- Beach soccer: 2011 FIFA Beach Soccer World Cup
