= Li Dan (speed skater) =

Chinese speed skater, born 1986

Personal information
- Born: May 12, 1986 (age 40) Jilin, China
- Height: 5 ft 5 in (165 cm)
- Weight: 137 lb (62 kg)

Sport
- Country: China
- Sport: Speed skating

Achievements and titles
- Highest world ranking: 25 (1000m)

Li Dan (Chinese: 李丹; pinyin: Lǐ Dān; Mandarin pronunciation: [lì tán]; born 12 May 1986 in Jilin) is a Chinese speed-skater.

Li competed at the 2014 Winter Olympics for China. In the 1000 metres she placed 34th.

As of September 2014, Li's best performance at the World Sprint Speed Skating Championships is 21st, in 2014.

Li made her World Cup debut in December 2002. As of September 2014, Li's top World Cup finish is 5th in a pair of races at Harbin in 2003–04. Her best overall finish in the World Cup is 25th, in the 2003–04 1000m.
