= 2014 World Sprint Speed Skating Championships =

International speed skating competition

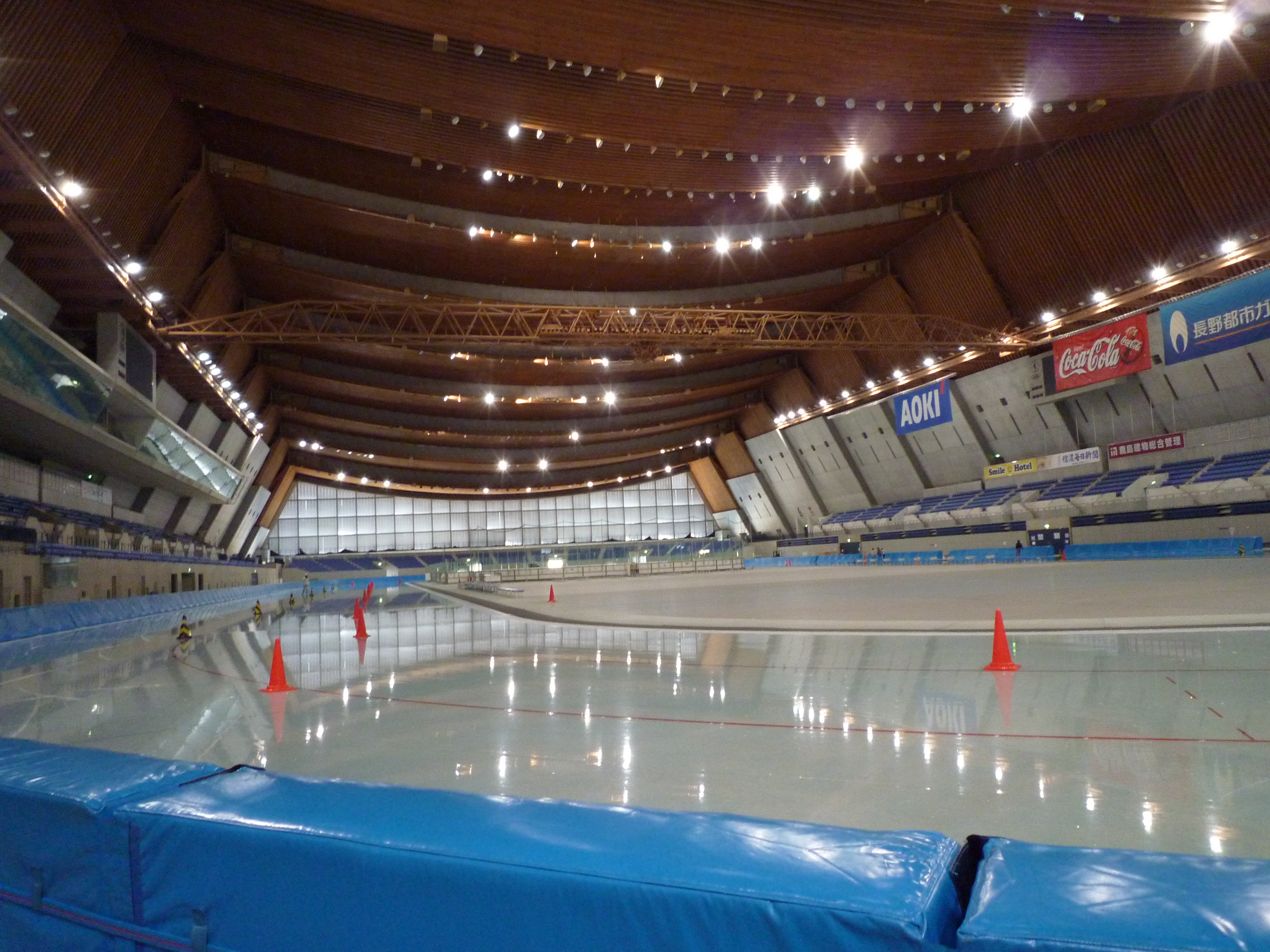
- M-Wave (Nagano)
- Venue: M-Wave, Nagano, Japan
- Dates: 18–19 January 2014
- Competitors: Men 26; Women 24

Medalist men
1st place, gold medalist(s)		Michel Mulder	NED
2nd place, silver medalist(s)		Shani Davis	USA
3rd place, bronze medalist(s)		Daniel Greig	AUS

Medalist women
1st place, gold medalist(s)		Yu Jing	CHN
2nd place, silver medalist(s)		Zhang Hong	CHN
3rd place, bronze medalist(s)		Heather Richardson	USA

The 2014 World Sprint Speed Skating Championships, officially the Essent ISU World Sprint Speed Skating Championships 2014, were held in Nagano, Japan, from 18 to 19 January 2014.

The defending champions were Michel Mulder of the Netherlands for men and Heather Richardson of the United States for women. In the men's championships, Mulder was able to retain his title. Shani Davis of the United States won the silver, and Daniel Greig of Australia won the bronze, thereby clinching his nation's first-ever medal at an international long-track speed skating competition. In the women's championships, Yu Jing of China re-claimed her title from 2012, while her compatriot Zhang Hong won the silver, and Richardson had to settle for the bronze medal.

== Schedule ==
The schedule of events:

Date	Events
Saturday, 18 January	14:00: 500 m women 14:44: 500 m men 15:35: 1000 m women 16:25: 1000 m men
Sunday, 19 January	14:30: 500 m women 15:21: 500 m men 16:12: 1000 m women 17:09: 1000 m men

All times are JST (UTC+9).

== Rules ==
All participating skaters are allowed to skate the two 500 meters and one 1000 meters; 24 skaters may take part on the second 1000 meters. These 24 skaters are determined by the samalog standings after the three skated distances, and comparing these lists as follows:

1. Skaters among the top 24 on both lists are qualified.
2. To make up a total of 24, skaters are then added in order of their best rank on either list.

== World records ==
World records going into the championships.

=== Men ===
Distance	Time	Holder	Nat.	Date	Venue	Reference
500 m	34.03	Jeremy Wotherspoon	(Canada)	9 November 2007	Utah Olympic Oval, Salt Lake City	
1000 m	1:06.42	Shani Davis	(United States)	7 March 2009	Utah Olympic Oval, Salt Lake City	

=== Women ===
Distance	Time	Holder	Nat.	Date	Venue	Reference
500 m	36.36	Lee Sang-hwa	(South Korea)	17 November 2013	Olympic Oval, Calgary	
1000 m	1:12.58	Brittany Bowe	(United States)	17 November 2013	Olympic Oval, Calgary	

== Men's championships ==
=== Day 1 ===
==== 500 metres ====
Rank	Skater	Nat.	Pair	Lane	Time	Notes	Points
1	Michel Mulder	(Netherlands)	11	i	34.83		34.830
2	Daniel Greig	(Australia)	7	i	35.19		35.190
3	Mirko Giacomo Nenzi	(Italy)	6	i	35.27		35.270
4	Roman Krech	(Kazakhstan)	2	o	35.32		35.320
5	William Dutton	(Canada)	11	o	35.37		35.370
6	Yuji Kamijo	(Japan)	4	o	35.40		35.400
7	Espen Aarnes Hvammen	(Norway)	7	o	35.41		35.410
8	Keiichiro Nagashima	(Japan)	13	i	35.43		35.430
9	Laurent Dubreuil	(Canada)	10	o	35.45		35.450
10	Takayuki Numazaki	(Japan)	3	o	35.50		35.500
11	Shani Davis	(United States)	6	o	35.58		35.580
12	Alexandre St-Jean	(Canada)	10	i	35.60		35.600
13	Ronald Mulder	(Netherlands)	12	o	35.67		35.670
14	Lee Kyou-hyuk	(South Korea)	8	i	35.68		35.680
15	Denis Kuzin	(Kazakhstan)	5	i	35.73		35.730
16	David Bosa	(Italy)	4	i	35.84		35.840
16	Tyler Derraugh	(Canada)	13	o	35.84		35.840
18	Kim Tae-yun	(South Korea)	5	o	35.90		35.900
18	Kjeld Nuis	(Netherlands)	9	i	35.90		35.900
20	Mitchell Whitmore	(United States)	12	i	36.00		36.000
21	Denis Dressel	(Germany)	2	i	36.35		36.350
21	Christoffer Fagerli Rukke	(Norway)	9	o	36.35		36.350
23	Tommi Pulli	(Finland)	3	i	36.43		36.430
24	Sergey Chadayev	(Russia)	1	o	36.55		36.550
25	Yevgeny Lalenkov	(Russia)	1	i	36.73		36.730
26	Denny Ihle	(Germany)	8	o	36.78		36.780

==== 1000 metres ====
Rank	Skater	Nat.	Pair	Lane	Time	Notes	Points
1	Denis Kuzin	(Kazakhstan)	13	i	1:09.37		34.685
2	Shani Davis	(United States)	13	o	1:09.44		34.720
3	Kjeld Nuis	(Netherlands)	10	i	1:09.56		34.780
4	William Dutton	(Canada)	8	i	1:09.89		34.945
5	Michel Mulder	(Netherlands)	12	o	1:09.91		34.955
6	Ronald Mulder	(Netherlands)	9	i	1:09.93		34.965
7	Kim Tae-yun	(South Korea)	7	i	1:10.27		35.135
8	Daniel Greig	(Australia)	9	o	1:10.36		35.180
9	Mirko Giacomo Nenzi	(Italy)	11	o	1:10.45		35.225
10	Alexandre St-Jean	(Canada)	8	o	1:10.49		35.245
11	Tyler Derraugh	(Canada)	6	o	1:10.51		35.255
12	Roman Krech	(Kazakhstan)	4	o	1:10.60		35.300
13	Laurent Dubreuil	(Canada)	7	o	1:10.64		35.320
14	Mitchell Whitmore	(United States)	12	i	1:10.94		35.470
15	Yevgeny Lalenkov	(Russia)	11	i	1:11.42		35.710
16	Lee Kyou-hyuk	(South Korea)	10	o	1:11.44		35.720
17	Yuji Kamijo	(Japan)	4	i	1:11.51		35.755
18	Christoffer Fagerli Rukke	(Norway)	6	i	1:11.54		35.770
19	Keiichiro Nagashima	(Japan)	2	i	1:11.92		35.960
20	Denis Dressel	(Germany)	5	o	1:12.00		36.000
21	Espen Aarnes Hvammen	(Norway)	5	i	1:12.02		36.010
22	David Bosa	(Italy)	2	o	1:12.39		36.195
23	Denny Ihle	(Germany)	3	o	1:12.42		36.210
24	Tommi Pulli	(Finland)	3	i	1:12.48		36.240
25	Takayuki Numazaki	(Japan)	1	o	1:12.79		36.395
26	Sergey Chadayev	(Russia)	1	i	1:14.07		37.035

=== Day 2 ===
==== 500 metres ====
Rank	Skater	Nat.	Pair	Lane	Time	Notes	Points
1	Michel Mulder	(Netherlands)	13	o	35.12		35.120
2	Daniel Greig	(Australia)	12	o	35.17		35.170
3	Keiichiro Nagashima	(Japan)	7	o	35.28		35.280
4	Laurent Dubreuil	(Canada)	9	i	35.34		35.340
5	Ronald Mulder	(Netherlands)	10	i	35.43		35.430
6	Alexandre St-Jean	(Canada)	8	o	35.45		35.450
7	Roman Krech	(Kazakhstan)	11	i	35.51		35.510
8	Kjeld Nuis	(Netherlands)	9	o	35.53		35.530
9	Yuji Kamijo	(Japan)	6	i	35.57		35.570
9	Mitchell Whitmore	(United States)	5	o	35.57		35.570
11	William Dutton	(Canada)	12	i	35.69		35.690
12	Espen Aarnes Hvammen	(Norway)	5	i	35.75		35.750
13	Takayuki Numazaki	(Japan)	4	i	35.76		35.760
14	Shani Davis	(United States)	13	i	35.82		35.820
14	Denis Kuzin	(Kazakhstan)	11	o	35.82		35.820
16	Mirko Giacomo Nenzi	(Italy)	10	o	35.88		35.880
17	Tyler Derraugh	(Canada)	7	i	35.95		35.950
18	Kim Tae-yun	(South Korea)	8	i	35.96		35.960
19	David Bosa	(Italy)	4	o	36.13		36.130
20	Denis Dressel	(Germany)	3	o	36.17		36.170
21	Lee Kyou-hyuk	(South Korea)	6	o	36.21		36.210
22	Christoffer Fagerli Rukke	(Norway)	3	i	36.25		36.250
22	Denny Ihle	(Germany)	2	i	36.25		36.250
24	Sergey Chadayev	(Russia)	1	i	36.36		36.360
25	Yevgeny Lalenkov	(Russia)	2	o	36.59		36.590
26	Tommi Pulli	(Finland)	1	o	36.62		36.620

==== Ranking after three events ====
Rank	Skater	Nat.	500 m (1)	1000 m	500 m (2)	Points
1						
2						
3						
4						

==== 1000 metres ====
Rank	Skater	Nat.	Pair	Lane	Time	Notes	Points
1	Shani Davis	(United States)	9	i	1:08.96		34.480
2	Denis Kuzin	(Kazakhstan)	9	o	1:09.54		34.770
3	Michel Mulder	(Netherlands)	12	i	1:09.96		34.980
4	Kjeld Nuis	(Netherlands)	10	o	1:09.99		34.995
5	Daniel Greig	(Australia)	11	i	1:10.35		35.175
6	Ronald Mulder	(Netherlands)	11	o	1:10.59		35.295
7	Alexandre St-Jean	(Canada)	7	i	1:10.61		35.305
8	William Dutton	(Canada)	12	o	1:10.78		35.390
9	Tyler Derraugh	(Canada)	5	i	1:10.83		35.415
10	Mitchell Whitmore	(United States)	5	o	1:10.85		35.425
11	Kim Tae-yun	(South Korea)	6	o	1:10.87		35.435
12	Mirko Giacomo Nenzi	(Italy)	6	i	1:10.88		35.440
13	Laurent Dubreuil	(Canada)	10	i	1:11.06		35.530
14	Roman Krech	(Kazakhstan)	8	i	1:11.10		35.550
15	Yevgeny Lalenkov	(Russia)	2	o	1:11.60		35.800
16	Christoffer Fagerli Rukke	(Norway)	3	o	1:11.71		35.855
17	Yuji Kamijo	(Japan)	7	o	1:11.78		35.890
17	Takayuki Numazaki	(Japan)	4	i	1:11.78		35.890
19	Espen Aarnes Hvammen	(Norway)	4	o	1:12.08		36.040
20	Denis Dressel	(Germany)	2	i	1:12.17		36.085
21	David Bosa	(Italy)	3	i	1:12.19		36.095
22	Keiichiro Nagashima	(Japan)	8	o	1:12.74		36.370
23	Denny Ihle	(Germany)	1	i	1:13.05		36.525
24	Tommi Pulli	(Finland)	1	o	1:15.07		37.535

=== Final ranking ===
Rank	Skater	Nat.	500 m (1)	1000 m (1)	500 m (2)	1000 m (2)	Points
1st place, gold medalist(s)	Michel Mulder	(Netherlands)	34.83 (1)	1:09.91 (5)	35.12 (1)	1:09.96 (3)	139.885
2nd place, silver medalist(s)	Shani Davis	(United States)	35.58 (11)	1:09.44 (2)	35.82 (14)	1:08.96 (1)	140.600
3rd place, bronze medalist(s)	Daniel Greig	(Australia)	35.19 (2)	1:10.36 (8)	35.17 (2)	1:10.35 (5)	140.715
4	Denis Kuzin	(Kazakhstan)	35.73 (15)	1:09.37 (1)	35.82 (14)	1:09.54 (2)	141.005
5	Kjeld Nuis	(Netherlands)	35.90 (18)	1:09.56 (3)	35.53 (8)	1:09.99 (4)	141.205
6	Ronald Mulder	(Netherlands)	35.67 (13)	1:09.93 (6)	35.43 (5)	1:10.59 (6)	141.360
7	William Dutton	(Canada)	35.37 (5)	1:09.89 (4)	35.69 (11)	1:10.78 (8)	141.395
8	Alexandre St-Jean	(Canada)	35.60 (12)	1:10.49 (10)	35.45 (6)	1:10.61 (7)	141.600
9	Laurent Dubreuil	(Canada)	35.45 (9)	1:10.64 (13)	35.34 (4)	1:11.06 (13)	141.640
10	Roman Krech	(Kazakhstan)	35.32 (4)	1:10.60 (12)	35.51 (7)	1:11.10 (14)	141.680
11	Mirko Giacomo Nenzi	(Italy)	35.27 (3)	1:10.45 (9)	35.88 (16)	1:10.88 (12)	141.815
12	Kim Tae-yun	(South Korea)	35.90 (18)	1:10.27 (7)	35.96 (18)	1:10.87 (11)	142.430
13	Tyler Derraugh	(Canada)	35.84 (16)	1:10.51 (11)	35.95 (17)	1:10.83 (9)	142.460
14	Mitchell Whitmore	(United States)	36.00 (20)	1:10.94 (14)	35.57 (9)	1:10.85 (10)	142.465
15	Yuji Kamijo	(Japan)	35.40 (6)	1:11.51 (17)	35.57 (9)	1:11.78 (17)	142.615
16	Keiichiro Nagashima	(Japan)	35.43 (8)	1:11.92 (19)	35.28 (3)	1:12.74 (22)	143.040
17	Espen Aarnes Hvammen	(Norway)	35.41 (7)	1:12.02 (21)	35.75 (12)	1:12.08 (19)	143.210
18	Takayuki Numazaki	(Japan)	35.50 (10)	1:12.79 (25)	35.76 (13)	1:11.78 (17)	143.545
19	Christoffer Fagerli Rukke	(Norway)	36.35 (21)	1:11.54 (18)	36.25 (22)	1:11.71 (16)	144.225
20	David Bosa	(Italy)	35.84 (16)	1:12.39 (22)	36.13 (19)	1:12.19 (21)	144.260
21	Denis Dressel	(Germany)	36.35 (21)	1:12.00 (20)	36.17 (20)	1:12.17 (20)	144.605
22	Yevgeny Lalenkov	(Russia)	36.73 (25)	1:11.42 (15)	36.59 (25)	1:11.60 (15)	144.830
23	Denny Ihle	(Germany)	36.78 (26)	1:12.42 (23)	36.25 (22)	1:13.05 (23)	145.765
24	Tommi Pulli	(Finland)	36.43 (23)	1:12.48 (24)	36.62 (26)	1:15.07 (24)	146.825
25	Lee Kyou-hyuk	(South Korea)	35.68 (14)	1:11.44 (16)	36.21 (21)		107.610
26	Sergey Chadayev	(Russia)	36.55 (24)	1:14.07 (26)	36.36 (24)		109.945

== Women's championships ==
=== Day 1 ===
==== 500 metres ====
Rank	Skater	Nat.	Pair	Lane	Time	Notes	Points
1	Yu Jing	(China)	9	i	37.67		37.670
2	Margot Boer	(Netherlands)	12	i	38.00		38.000
3	Heather Richardson	(United States)	10	i	38.04		38.040
4	Nao Kodaira	(Japan)	12	o	38.06		38.060
5	Zhang Hong	(China)	11	i	38.11		38.110
6	Laurine van Riessen	(Netherlands)	8	o	38.29		38.290
7	Thijsje Oenema	(Netherlands)	9	o	38.46		38.460
8	Yekaterina Aydova	(Kazakhstan)	11	o	38.48		38.480
9	Maki Tsuji	(Japan)	7	o	38.60		38.600
10	Anice Das	(Netherlands)	6	o	38.77		38.770
11	Miyako Sumiyoshi	(Japan)	10	o	38.91		38.910
12	Sugar Todd	(United States)	5	o	38.98		38.980
13	Denise Roth	(Germany)	6	i	39.01		39.010
14	Kim Hyun-yung	(South Korea)	5	i	39.05		39.050
15	Christine Nesbitt	(Canada)	8	i	39.08		39.080
16	Yuliya Kozyreva	(Russia)	2	o	39.23		39.230
17	Li Dan	(China)	3	i	39.27		39.270
18	Park Seung-ju	(South Korea)	2	i	39.34		39.340
19	Jennifer Plate	(Germany)	7	i	39.39		39.390
20	Nadezhda Aseyeva	(Russia)	1	o	39.52		39.520
21	Angelina Golikova	(Russia)	4	i	39.74		39.740
22	Elina Risku	(Finland)	4	o	40.12		40.120
23	Yvonne Daldossi	(Italy)	1	i	40.24		40.240
24	Hege Bøkko	(Norway)	3	o	40.40		40.400

==== 1000 metres ====
Rank	Skater	Nat.	Pair	Lane	Time	Notes	Points
1	Zhang Hong	(China)	12	i	1:15.17		37.585
2	Margot Boer	(Netherlands)	10	o	1:15.31		37.655
3	Yu Jing	(China)	9	i	1:15.61		37.805
4	Heather Richardson	(United States)	11	i	1:15.86		37.930
5	Christine Nesbitt	(Canada)	12	o	1:16.42		38.210
6	Thijsje Oenema	(Netherlands)	7	i	1:16.45		38.225
7	Laurine van Riessen	(Netherlands)	11	o	1:16.98		38.490
8	Nao Kodaira	(Japan)	10	i	1:17.22		38.610
9	Anice Das	(Netherlands)	6	o	1:17.43		38.715
10	Yekaterina Aydova	(Kazakhstan)	5	i	1:17.45		38.725
11	Kim Hyun-yung	(South Korea)	9	o	1:18.19		39.095
12	Maki Tsuji	(Japan)	6	i	1:18.50		39.250
13	Angelina Golikova	(Russia)	4	i	1:18.77		39.385
14	Sugar Todd	(United States)	7	o	1:18.97		39.485
15	Park Seung-ju	(South Korea)	2	o	1:19.29		39.645
16	Jennifer Plate	(Germany)	5	o	1:19.37		39.685
17	Denise Roth	(Germany)	8	o	1:19.62		39.810
18	Miyako Sumiyoshi	(Japan)	8	i	1:19.70		39.850
19	Hege Bøkko	(Norway)	1	o	1:20.06		40.030
20	Yuliya Kozyreva	(Russia)	4	o	1:20.13		40.065
21	Nadezhda Aseyeva	(Russia)	3	i	1:20.26		40.130
22	Li Dan	(China)	2	i	1:21.12		40.560
23	Yvonne Daldossi	(Italy)	3	o	1:22.02		41.010
24	Elina Risku	(Finland)	1	i	1:22.18		41.090

=== Day 2 ===
==== 500 metres ====
Rank	Skater	Nat.	Pair	Lane	Time	Notes	Points
1	Yu Jing	(China)	12	o	37.72		37.720
2	Margot Boer	(Netherlands)	11	o	38.15		38.150
3	Heather Richardson	(United States)	9	o	38.18		38.180
4	Zhang Hong	(China)	10	o	38.29		38.290
5	Nao Kodaira	(Japan)	12	i	38.33		38.330
6	Thijsje Oenema	(Netherlands)	11	i	38.59		38.590
7	Laurine van Riessen	(Netherlands)	10	i	38.68		38.680
8	Maki Tsuji	(Japan)	7	i	38.72		38.720
9	Yekaterina Aydova	(Kazakhstan)	9	i	38.75		38.750
10	Miyako Sumiyoshi	(Japan)	5	i	38.81		38.810
11	Kim Hyun-yung	(South Korea)	7	o	38.93		38.930
12	Yuliya Kozyreva	(Russia)	4	i	38.95		38.950
13	Denise Roth	(Germany)	6	o	39.02		39.020
14	Christine Nesbitt	(Canada)	8	o	39.03		39.030
15	Sugar Todd	(United States)	6	i	39.22		39.220
16	Jennifer Plate	(Germany)	4	o	39.28		39.280
17	Anice Das	(Netherlands)	8	i	39.31		39.310
18	Park Seung-ju	(South Korea)	5	o	39.36		39.360
19	Li Dan	(China)	2	o	39.63		39.630
20	Angelina Golikova	(Russia)	3	o	39.70		39.700
21	Nadezhda Aseyeva	(Russia)	3	i	39.85		39.850
22	Yvonne Daldossi	(Italy)	1	o	40.04		40.040
23	Elina Risku	(Finland)	1	i	40.09		40.090
24	Hege Bøkko	(Norway)	2	i	40.67		40.670

==== Ranking after three events ====
Rank	Skater	Nat.	500 m (1)	1000 m	500 m (2)	Points
1						
2						
3						
4						

==== 1000 metres ====
Rank	Skater	Nat.	Pair	Lane	Time	Notes	Points
1	Heather Richardson	(United States)	10	o	1:15.28		37.640
2	Zhang Hong	(China)	11	o	1:15.44		37.720
3	Margot Boer	(Netherlands)	12	i	1:16.12		38.060
4	Yu Jing	(China)	12	o	1:16.16		38.080
5	Christine Nesbitt	(Canada)	10	i	1:16.60		38.300
6	Laurine van Riessen	(Netherlands)	11	i	1:16.95		38.475
7	Nao Kodaira	(Japan)	9	o	1:17.01		38.505
8	Yekaterina Aydova	(Kazakhstan)	7	o	1:17.15		38.575
9	Thijsje Oenema	(Netherlands)	8	o	1:17.70		38.850
10	Anice Das	(Netherlands)	9	i	1:18.15		39.075
11	Maki Tsuji	(Japan)	6	o	1:18.59		39.295
12	Kim Hyun-yung	(South Korea)	8	i	1:18.61		39.305
13	Miyako Sumiyoshi	(Japan)	5	o	1:18.62		39.310
14	Park Seung-ju	(South Korea)	4	i	1:19.04		39.520
15	Sugar Todd	(United States)	7	i	1:19.45		39.725
16	Denise Roth	(Germany)	6	i	1:19.46		39.730
17	Hege Bøkko	(Norway)	2	i	1:19.49		39.745
18	Angelina Golikova	(Russia)	4	o	1:19.97		39.985
19	Jennifer Plate	(Germany)	3	i	1:20.02		40.010
20	Yuliya Kozyreva	(Russia)	5	i	1:20.14		40.070
21	Nadezhda Aseyeva	(Russia)	2	o	1:21.35		40.675
22	Yvonne Daldossi	(Italy)	1	i	1:21.37		40.685
23	Li Dan	(China)	3	o	1:21.97		40.985
24	Elina Risku	(Finland)	1	o	1:22.36		41.180

=== Final ranking ===
Rank	Skater	Nat.	500 m (1)	1000 m (1)	500 m (2)	1000 m (2)	Points
1st place, gold medalist(s)	Yu Jing	(China)	37.67 (1)	1:15.61 (3)	37.72 (1)	1:16.16 (4)	151.275
2nd place, silver medalist(s)	Zhang Hong	(China)	38.11 (5)	1:15.17 (1)	38.29 (4)	1:15.44 (2)	151.705
3rd place, bronze medalist(s)	Heather Richardson	(United States)	38.04 (3)	1:15.86 (4)	38.18 (3)	1:15.28 (1)	151.790
4	Margot Boer	(Netherlands)	38.00 (2)	1:15.31 (2)	38.15 (2)	1:16.12 (3)	151.865
5	Nao Kodaira	(Japan)	38.06 (4)	1:17.22 (8)	38.33 (5)	1:17.01 (7)	153.505
6	Laurine van Riessen	(Netherlands)	38.29 (6)	1:16.98 (7)	38.68 (7)	1:16.95 (6)	153.935
7	Thijsje Oenema	(Netherlands)	38.46 (7)	1:16.45 (6)	38.59 (6)	1:17.70 (9)	154.125
8	Yekaterina Aydova	(Kazakhstan)	38.48 (8)	1:17.45 (10)	38.75 (9)	1:17.15 (8)	154.530
9	Christine Nesbitt	(Canada)	39.08 (15)	1:16.42 (5)	39.03 (14)	1:16.60 (5)	154.620
10	Maki Tsuji	(Japan)	38.60 (9)	1:18.50 (12)	38.72 (8)	1:18.59 (11)	155.865
11	Anice Das	(Netherlands)	38.77 (10)	1:17.43 (9)	39.31 (17)	1:18.15 (10)	155.870
12	Kim Hyun-yung	(South Korea)	39.05 (14)	1:18.19 (11)	38.93 (11)	1:18.61 (12)	156.380
13	Miyako Sumiyoshi	(Japan)	38.91 (11)	1:19.70 (18)	38.81 (10)	1:18.62 (13)	156.880
14	Sugar Todd	(United States)	38.98 (12)	1:18.97 (14)	39.22 (15)	1:19.45 (15)	157.410
15	Denise Roth	(Germany)	39.01 (13)	1:19.62 (17)	39.02 (13)	1:19.46 (16)	157.570
16	Park Seung-ju	(South Korea)	39.34 (18)	1:19.29 (15)	39.36 (18)	1:19.04 (14)	157.865
17	Yuliya Kozyreva	(Russia)	39.23 (16)	1:20.13 (20)	38.95 (12)	1:20.14 (20)	158.315
18	Jennifer Plate	(Germany)	39.39 (19)	1:19.37 (16)	39.28 (16)	1:20.02 (19)	158.365
19	Angelina Golikova	(Russia)	39.74 (21)	1:18.77 (13)	39.70 (20)	1:19.97 (18)	158.810
20	Nadezhda Aseyeva	(Russia)	39.52 (20)	1:20.26 (21)	39.85 (21)	1:21.35 (21)	160.175
21	Li Dan	(China)	39.27 (17)	1:21.12 (22)	39.63 (19)	1:21.97 (23)	160.445
22	Hege Bøkko	(Norway)	40.40 (24)	1:20.06 (19)	40.67 (24)	1:19.49 (17)	160.845
23	Yvonne Daldossi	(Italy)	40.24 (23)	1:22.02 (23)	40.04 (22)	1:21.37 (22)	161.975
24	Elina Risku	(Finland)	40.12 (22)	1:22.18 (24)	40.09 (23)	1:22.36 (24)	162.480
