= Denise Roth =

German speed skater (born 1988)

Personal information
- Born: 12 September 1988 (age 37) Berlin, East Germany
- Height: 1.64 m (5 ft 5 in)
- Weight: 60 kg (132 lb)

Sport
- Country: Germany
- Sport: Speed skating

Denise Roth (born 12 September 1988) is a German speed skater. She was born in Berlin. She competed at the 2014 World Sprint Championships in Nagano, and at the 2014 Winter Olympics in Sochi, in 500 meters.
