= Gabriele Hirschbichler =

German speed skater

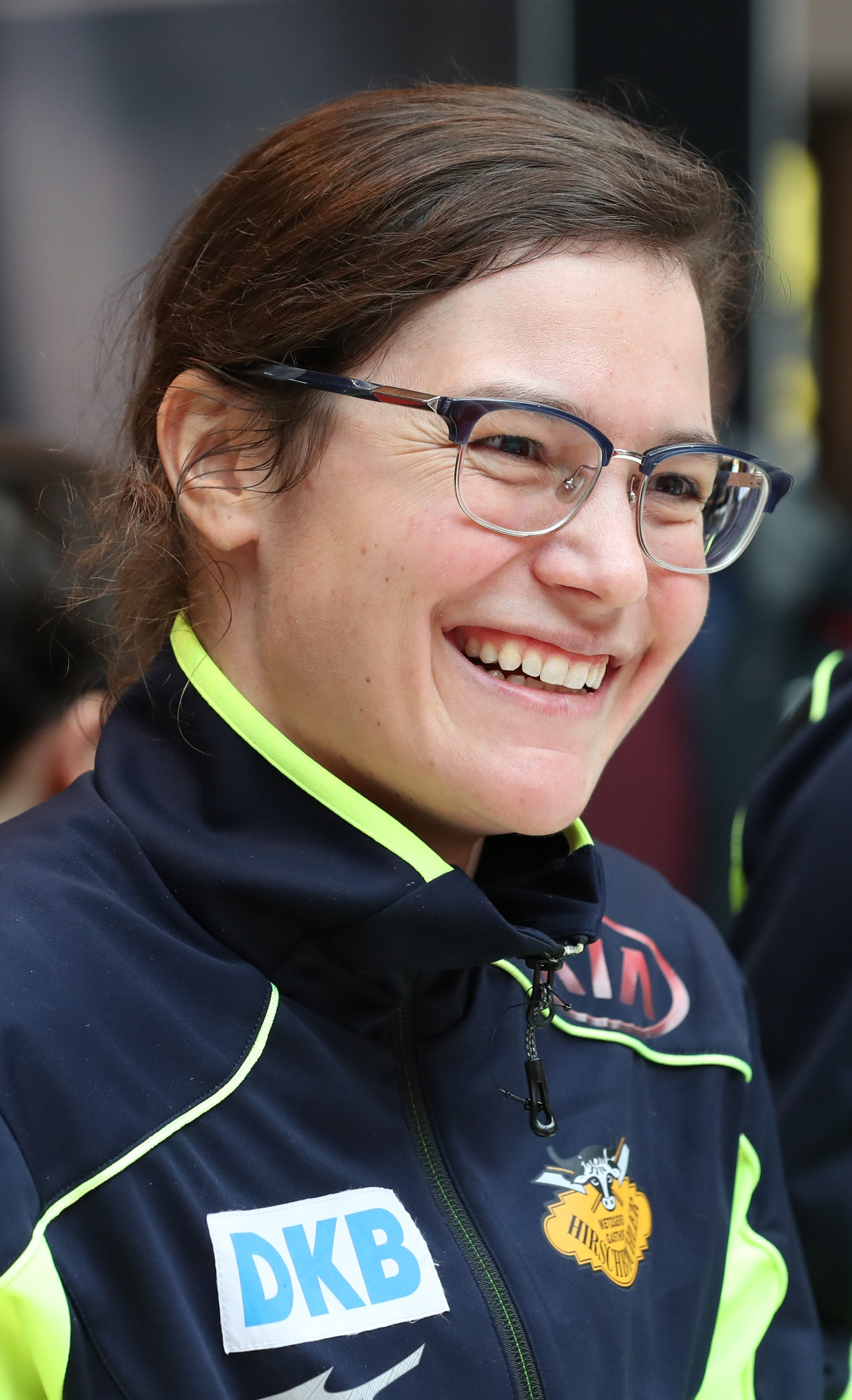
- Hirschbichler in 2018

Personal information
- Full name: Gabriele Renate Hirschbichler
- Born: 26 December 1983 (age 42) Traunstein, Germany
- Height: 168 cm (5 ft 6 in)
- Weight: 62 kg (137 lb)

Sport
- Sport: Speed skating

Gabriele Renate "Gabi" Hirschbichler (born 26 December 1983) is a German speed skater. She was born in Traunstein. She competed at the 2011 World Sprint Speed Skating Championships in Heerenveen, and at the 2014 Winter Olympics in Sochi, in 500 meters and 1000 meters.
