= Miyako Sumiyoshi =

Japanese speed skater (1987–2018)

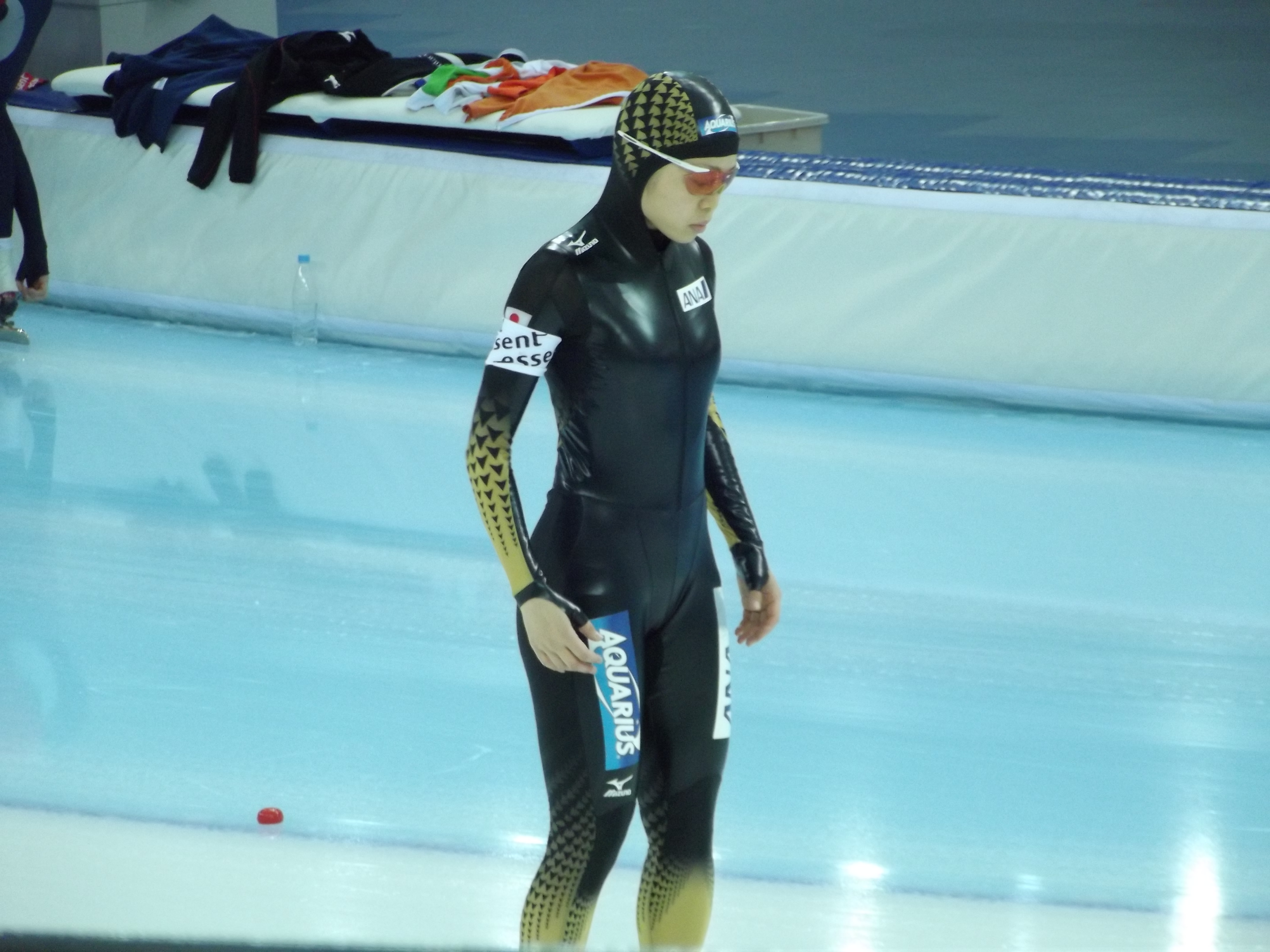
- Sumiyoshi in Sochi in 2013

Personal information
- Nationality: Japanese
- Born: 19 March 1987 Kushiro, Japan
- Died: 20 January 2018 (aged 30) Nagano, Japan

Sport
- Sport: Speed skating

Miyako Sumiyoshi (住吉 都, Sumiyoshi Miyako; 19 March 1987 – 20 January 2018) was a Japanese speed skater. She competed at the 2013 World Sprint Championships in Salt Lake City, where she placed thirteenth. She also placed thirteenth in the sprint combination at the 2014 World Sprint Championships in Nagano. She competed at the 2014 Winter Olympics in Sochi, in the 500 metres (14th) and in the 1000 metres (22nd).

On 20 January 2018, she was found dead in her home in Nagano. NHK reported that she seemed to have committed suicide.
