= Qi Shuai =

Chinese speed-skater (born 1988)

Personal information
- Born: February 13, 1988 (age 38) Anda, China
- Height: 5 ft 7 in (170 cm)
- Weight: 134 lb (61 kg)

Sport
- Country: China
- Sport: Speed skating

Achievements and titles
- Highest world ranking: 14 (500m)

Qi Shuai (born February 13, 1988, in Anda) is a Chinese speed-skater.

Qi competed at the 2014 Winter Olympics for China. In the 500 metres she finished 23rd overall.

As of September 2014, Qi's best performance at the World Single Distance Speed Skating Championships is 21st, in the 2011 500m. Her best performance at the World Sprint Speed Skating Championships is 21st, in 2011.

Qi made her World Cup debut in November 2010. As of September 2014, Qi's top World Cup finish is 7th in a pair of 500m races in 2010–11. Her best overall finish in the World Cup is 14th, in the 2010–11 500m.
