= Yuji Kamijo =

Japanese speed skater (born 1986)

Personal information
- Born: 7 April 1986 (age 40)

Sport
- Country: Japan
- Sport: Speed skating

Yuji Kamijo (上條 有司, Kamijō Yūji; born 7 April 1986) is a Japanese speed skater. He competed at the 2014 Winter Olympics in Sochi, in the 500 meters.
