= Zhang Hong (speed skater) =

Chinese long track speed skater

Zhang Hong OLY
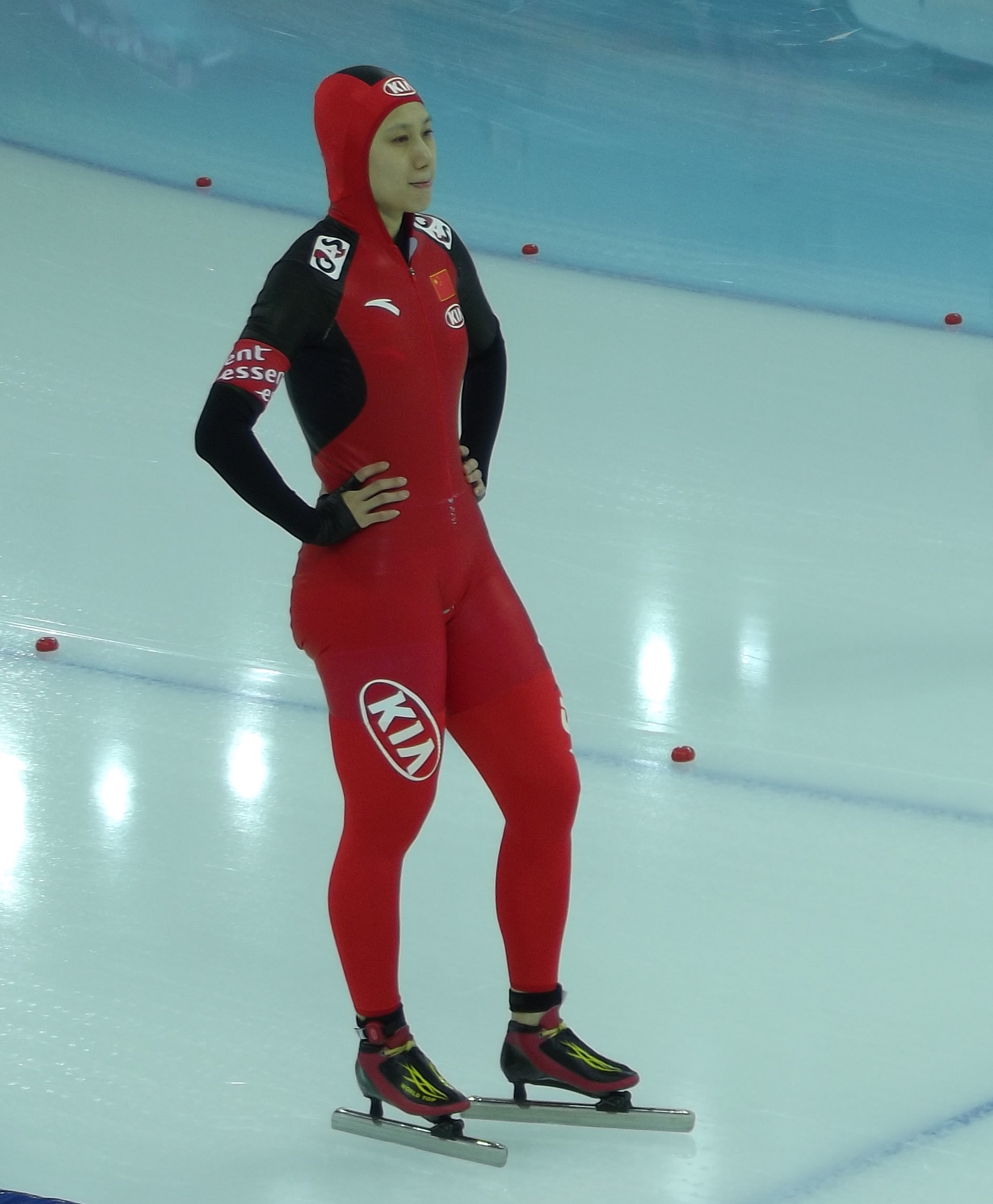
- Zhang Hong at the 2013 World Single Distance Championships

Personal information
- Born: 12 April 1988 (age 38) Harbin, Heilongjiang, China
- Height: 1.74 m (5 ft 9 in)
- Weight: 65 kg (143 lb)

Sport
- Country: China
- Sport: Speed skating
- Turned pro: 2008
- Retired: 2023
Medal record
Olympic Games
| Gold medal – first place | 2014 Sochi | 1000 m |
World Sprint Championships
| Silver medal – second place | 2014 Nagano | Women |
| Bronze medal – third place | 2012 Calgary | Women |
World Single Distance Championships
| Bronze medal – third place | 2016 Kolomna | 500 m |

Zhang Hong
- Simplified Chinese: 张虹
- Traditional Chinese: 張虹
Transcriptions
Standard Mandarin
- Hanyu Pinyin: Zhāng Hóng
- IPA: [ʈʂáŋ xʊ̌ŋ]

Zhang Hong (Chinese: 张虹; pinyin: Zhāng Hóng; Mandarin pronunciation: [ʈʂáŋ xʊ̌ŋ]; born 12 April 1988), alternatively spelled as Chang Hung is a Chinese long track speed skater, known best from her gold medal in the 1000 meters in the 2014 Winter Olympics in Sochi.

Previously Zhang won a bronze medal in the 2012 World Sprint Championships. She set two personal records and received bronze medal in the 500 meters (28 January 2012). Her total points record for the championships (all four races) was the third best of all times. She started her skating career in 2008 and had victories in the Chinese National Winter Games 2012 where she represented the People's Liberation Army delegation.

Zhang is the current holder of the Chinese records on 500 and 1000 metres. In 2018, she became a member of the International Olympic Committee (IOC). She is an executive board member of the Chinese Olympic Committee.

== Merits ==
- Chinese National Winter Games 2012: (gold) short-track (1000 m: 1.17,27 / 1.16,66 = 154.145), (silver) 500 m (38,45)
- 2012 World Sprint Speed Skating Championships: Sprint (bronze)
- 2014 World Sprint Speed Skating Championships: Sprint (silver)
- 2014 Winter Olympics – 1000 meters: (gold)
- 2016 World Single Distance Speed Skating Championships – 500 meters: (bronze)

== Personal bests ==
Personal records
Women's speed skating
| Event | Result | Date | Location | Notes |
| 500 m | 36.56 | 20 November 2015 | Utah Olympic Oval, Salt Lake City | Current Chinese record. |
| 1000 m | 1:12.65 | 14 November 2015 | Olympic Oval, Calgary | Current Chinese record. |
| 1500 m | 1:59.42 | 17 November 2012 | Thialf, Heerenveen | |
| 3000 m | 4:30.77 | 20 December 2012 | Jilin Provincial Speed Skating Rink, Changchun | |
| 5000 m | 7:43.08 | 21 December 2012 | Jilin Provincial Speed Skating Rink, Changchun | |

- Total points sprint: 37,63 + 37,87 + 1.14,44 + 1.13,97 = 149.705 (bronze medal and the third best ever total points record)
