= Kim Hyun-yung =

South Korean speed skater

Personal information
- Born: October 19, 1994 (age 31) Seoul, South Korea
- Height: 5 ft 6 in (168 cm)
- Weight: 123 lb (56 kg)

Sport
- Country: South Korea
- Sport: Speed skating

Achievements and titles
- Highest world ranking: 22 (1000 m)
Medal record
Women's speed skating
Representing South Korea
Four Continents Championships
Silver medal – second place	2020 Milwaukee	Team Sprint
Bronze medal – third place	2020 Milwaukee	500 m

- Kim Hyun-yung
- Hangul: 김현영
- Hanja: 金賢榮
- RR: Gim Hyeonyeong
- MR: Kim Hyŏnyŏng

Kim Hyun-yung (Korean: 김현영, born October 19, 1994 in Seoul) is a South Korean former speed-skater.

Kim competed at the 2014 Winter Olympics for South Korea. In the 500 metres she finished 24th overall, and in the 1000 metres she was 28th.

As of September 2014, Kim's best performance at the World Single Distance Speed Skating Championships is 22nd, in the 2013 500 m. Her best performance at the World Sprint Speed Skating Championships is 12th, in 2014. Kim has won five medals across four World Junior Speed Skating Championships, including the 500 m championship in 2013.

Kim made her World Cup debut in November 2011. As of September 2014, Kim's top World Cup finish is 15th in a 1000 m race at Salt Lake City in 2013–14. Her best overall finish in the World Cup is 22nd, in the 2013–14 1000 m.
