= Yekaterina Aydova =

Kazakhstani speed skater (born 1991)

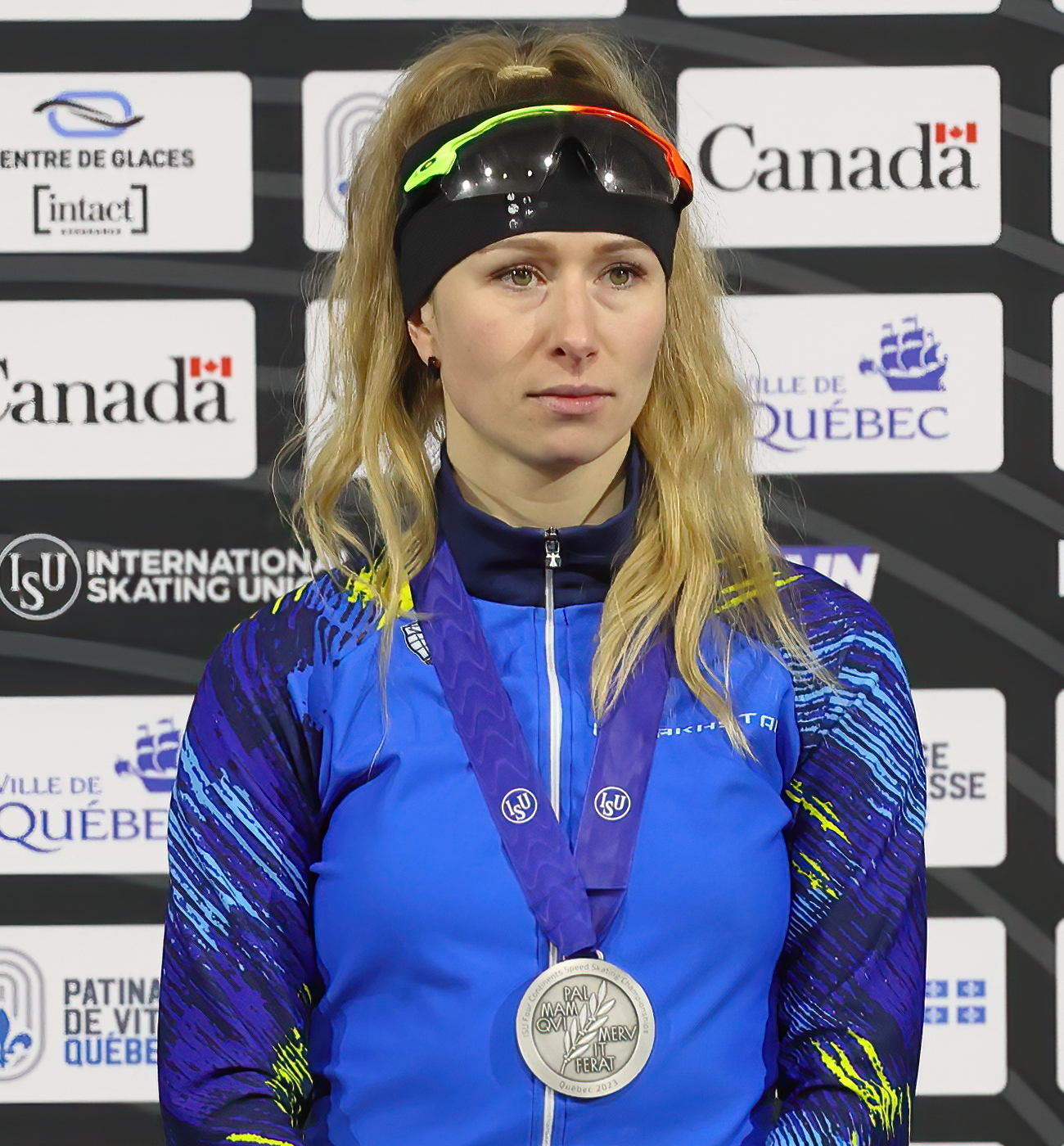
- Aydova in 2022

Personal information
- Born: 30 July 1991 (age 34)

Sport
- Country: Kazakhstan
- Sport: Speed skating
Medal record
Women's speed skating
Representing Kazakhstan
Four Continents Championships
Silver medal – second place	2023 Quebec	1000 m
Silver medal – second place	2023 Quebec	1500 m

Yekaterina Aydova (Екатерина Айдова, born 30 July 1991) is a Kazakhstani speed skater, born in Karaganda.

== Career ==
She competed at the 2011, 2012 and 2013 World Sprint Championships in Salt Lake City, the 2014 World Sprint Championships in Nagano, and at the 2014 Winter Olympics in Sochi.

In January 2022, Aydova was named as one of Kazakhstan's flagbearer during the opening ceremony of the 2022 Winter Olympics.
