= Maki Tsuji =

Japanese speed skater (born 1985)

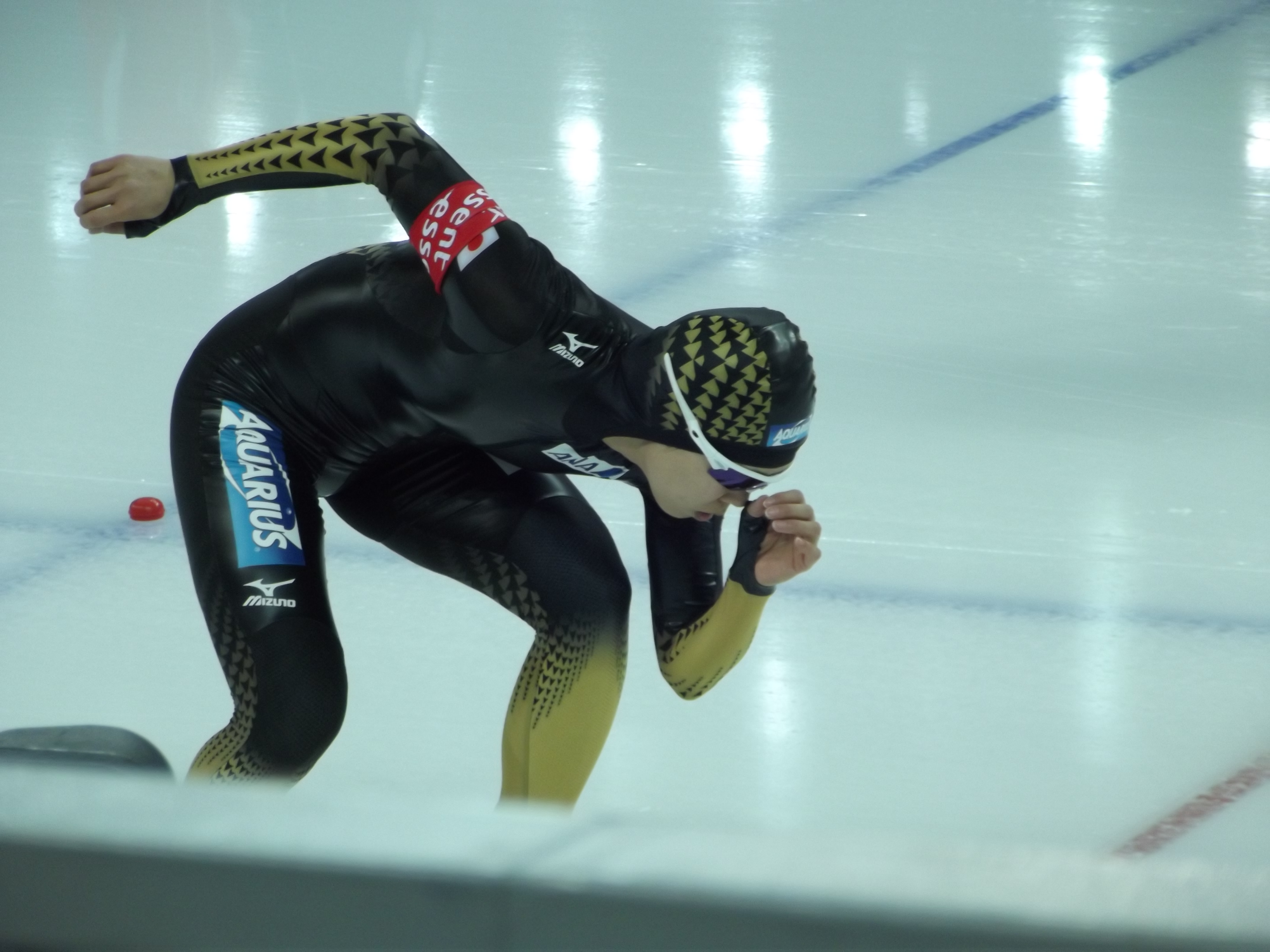

Personal information
- Born: 27 April 1985 (age 41) Obihiro, Hokkaido, Japan
- Height: 1.62 m (5 ft 4 in)
- Weight: 58 kg (128 lb)

Sport
- Country: Japan
- Sport: Speed skating

Maki Tsuji (辻 麻希, Tsuji Maki; born 27 April 1985) is a Japanese speed skater. She competed at the 2011, 2013 and 2014 World Sprint Championships, and at the 2014 Winter Olympics in Sochi.
