= Speed skating at the 2014 Winter Olympics – Women's 5000 metres =

Women's 5000 metres at the XXII Olympic Winter Games
- Pictogram of speed skating
- Venue: Adler Arena Skating Center
- Date: 19 February 2014
- Competitors: 16 from 9 nations
- Winning time: 6:51.54

Medalists
1st place, gold medalist(s)		Martina Sáblíková	Czech Republic
2nd place, silver medalist(s)		Ireen Wüst	Netherlands
3rd place, bronze medalist(s)		Carien Kleibeuker	Netherlands

The women's 5000 metres speed skating competition of the 2014 Sochi Olympics was held at Adler Arena Skating Center on 19 February 2014.

== Qualification ==
A total of sixteen speed skaters could qualify for this distance, with a maximum of three skaters per country. The top 10 of the 2013–14 ISU Speed Skating World Cup – Women's 3000 and 5000 metres standings after the fourth World Cup race in Berlin secured a spot for their country. Then the additional six spots were awarded based on a time ranking of the World Cup 5000 metres race in Astana. A reserve list was also made.

By virtue of Ivanie Blondin's top eight classification at the 2013 World Single Distance Speed Skating Championships – Women's 5000 metres in the pre-olympic season, Canada was given a wildcard at the expense of number 16 Mari Hemmer (who would have secured Norway a second spot).

== Records ==
Prior to this competition, the existing world and Olympic records were as follows.

World record	Martina Sáblíková (CZE)	6:42.66	Salt Lake City, United States	18 February 2011
Olympic record	Claudia Pechstein (GER)	6:46.91	Salt Lake City, United States	23 February 2002

At the 2013 World Single Distance Speed Skating Championships the track record was set by Martina Sáblíková at 6:54.31.

The following record was set during this competition.

Date	Round	Athlete	Country	Time	Record
19 February	Pair 7	Martina Sáblíková	Czech Republic	6:51.54	TR

TR = track record

== Results ==
The races were started at 17:30.

Rank	Pair	Lane	Name	Country	Time	Time behind	Notes
1st place, gold medalist(s)	7	O	Martina Sáblíková	Czech Republic	6:51.54	—	TR
2nd place, silver medalist(s)	7	I	Ireen Wüst	Netherlands	6:54.28	+2.74	
3rd place, bronze medalist(s)	5	O	Carien Kleibeuker	Netherlands	6:55.66	+4.12	
4	6	O	Olga Graf	Russia	6:55.77	+4.23	
5	8	O	Claudia Pechstein	Germany	6:58.39	+6.85	
6	8	I	Yvonne Nauta	Netherlands	7:01.76	+10.22	
7	3	O	Mari Hemmer	Norway	7:04.45	+12.91	
8	4	I	Stephanie Beckert	Germany	7:07.79	+16.25	
9	3	I	Anna Chernova	Russia	7:08.71	+17.17	
10	2	O	Shoko Fujimura	Japan	7:09.65	+18.11	
11	1	O	Bente Kraus	Germany	7:10.65	+19.11	
12	6	I	Shiho Ishizawa	Japan	7:11.54	+20.00	
13	5	I	Masako Hozumi	Japan	7:12.42	+20.88	
14	2	I	Ivanie Blondin	Canada	7:20.10	+28.56	
15	1	I	Katarzyna Wozniak	Poland	7:28.53	+36.99	
16	4	O	Maria Lamb	United States	7:29.64	+38.10	

TR = track record
