= Speed skating at the 2014 Winter Olympics – Qualification =

The following is about the qualification rules and the quota allocation for the speed skating events at the 2014 Winter Olympics.

== Qualification ==
Each NOC is allowed to delegate a maximal number of ten men and ten women speed skaters who reached the qualification criteria. A proposal of the Dutch skating association (KNSB) to add an extra athlete, especially for the team pursuit event, was rejected at the congress of the international federation ISU in Kuala Lumpur in June 2012.

=== Qualification times ===
The qualification times were released in July 2013. The women's times stay the same from Vancouver except for a more stringent standard in the 3000 m, while the men's qualification times have all slightly decreased.

Event	Men	Women
500 m	35.90	39.50
1000 m	1:10.80	1:18.50
1500 m	1:48.50	2:00.00
3000 m	n.a.	4:15.00
5000 m	6:33.00	7:20.00 or 4:10.00 (3000 m)
10000 m	13:30.00 or 6:28.00 (5000 m)	n.a.

=== Pre-qualification ===
Every nation that would not achieve any quota places in the 2013–14 ISU Speed Skating World Cup could be allocated one spot based on the results in the previous season if one skater would have achieved at least the following result. For the 500, 1000, 1500 meters, 3000 meters women, and 5000 meters men, a place among the top 16 of the 2012–13 ISU Speed Skating World Cup or the 2013 World Single Distance Speed Skating Championships; for the 5000 meters women and 10000 meters men, a place among the top 8 of the 2012–13 ISU Speed Skating World Cup or the 2013 World Single Distance Speed Skating Championships. Also, as hosts, both the Russian men and women will be allocated one of eight spots in the team pursuit events.

The following table shows which countries met these criteria for which distance.

	Men					Women				
Countries	500 m	1000 m	1500 m	5000 m	10000 m	500 m	1000 m	1500 m	3000 m	5000 m
Australia		Yes								
Belgium			Yes	Yes	Yes				Yes	
Canada	Yes	Yes		Yes		Yes	Yes	Yes	Yes	Yes
China						Yes	Yes			
Czech Republic						Yes	Yes	Yes	Yes	Yes
Finland	Yes	Yes								
France			Yes	Yes						
Germany	Yes	Yes		Yes	Yes	Yes	Yes	Yes	Yes	Yes
Italy	Yes	Yes								
Japan	Yes					Yes	Yes	Yes	Yes	
Kazakhstan		Yes		Yes		Yes	Yes			
Latvia		Yes	Yes							
Netherlands	Yes	Yes	Yes	Yes	Yes	Yes	Yes	Yes	Yes	Yes
New Zealand				Yes	Yes					
Norway			Yes	Yes	Yes			Yes	Yes	
Poland	Yes	Yes	Yes	Yes				Yes	Yes	
Russia	Yes	Yes	Yes	Yes		Yes	Yes	Yes	Yes	Yes
South Korea	Yes	Yes		Yes	Yes	Yes		Yes	Yes	
United States	Yes	Yes	Yes	Yes		Yes	Yes			

=== Current quotas ===
Qualification standings after the final World Cup. Current quotas as of 23 December 2013:

	Men							Women						
Countries	Max quota	500 m	1000 m	1500 m	5000 m	10000 m	Team pursuit	Max quota	500 m	1000 m	1500 m	3000 m	5000 m	Team pursuit
Australia	2	1	1											
Austria	1			1				3	1	1		1		
Belgium	3			1	1	1		2			1	1		
Canada	8	4	4	4	1		X	10	4	4	4	2	1	X
China	3	2	1					8	4	3	2			
Chinese Taipei	2	1	1											
Czech Republic								6	1	1	2	1	1	
Finland	4	2	2											
France	6		1	2	2	1	X							
Germany	8	3	2	2	3	2		8	4	4	3	3	2	
Hungary	1			1										
Italy	6	2	1	2	1			2	1			1		
Japan	8	4	2	1	1			10	4	4	4	3	3	X
Kazakhstan	8	1	3	3	1	1		3	1	1	1			
Latvia	3		1	1	1									
Netherlands	10	4	4	4	3	3	X	10	4	4	4	3	3	X
New Zealand	3			1	1	1								
Norway	10	2	4	3	3	2	X	6		1	2	2	1	X
Poland	8	2	2	3	2		X	8		3	3	3	1	X
Russia	10	4	4	4	3	3	X	10	4	4	4	3	2	X
South Korea	10	4	3	2	2	1	X	10	4	2	3	3	1	X
Sweden	1			1										
United States	10	4	4	4	3	1	X	10	4	4	3	2	1	X
Total: 23 NOCs	125	40	40	40	28	16	8	106	36	36	36	28	16	8
