= Speed skating at the 2014 Winter Olympics =

Speed skating at the XXII Olympic Winter Games
- Venue: Adler Arena, Sochi, Russia
- Dates: 8–22 February 2014
- No. of events: 12
- Competitors: 179 from 23 nations

Speed skating at the 2014 Winter Olympics was held at the Adler Arena, Sochi, Russia, between 8 and 22 February 2014.

== Competition schedule ==
The following is the competition schedule for all twelve events. With the exception of the Team pursuit events, all rounds of each event were concluded within a single session.

All times are (UTC+4).

Date	Time	Event
8 February	15:30	Men's 5000 metres
9 February	15:30	Women's 3000 metres
10 February	17:00	Men's 500 metres
11 February	16:45	Women's 500 metres
12 February	18:00	Men's 1000 metres
13 February	18:00	Women's 1000 metres
15 February	17:30	Men's 1500 metres
16 February	18:00	Women's 1500 metres
18 February	17:00	Men's 10000 metres
19 February	17:30	Women's 5000 metres
21 February	17:30	Team pursuit men – qualification
21 February	17:30	Team pursuit women – qualification
22 February	17:30	Team pursuit men – Finals
22 February	17:30	Team pursuit women – Finals

== Medal summary ==
Netherlands dominated in speed skating, winning a total of 23 medals including eight out of the twelve gold medals and medals in all events. There were four Dutch podium sweeps where the Netherlands won the gold, silver and bronze medal, making the Netherlands the first country in Olympic speed skating history to achieve this. The events were the: Men's 5000m, Men's 500m, Women's 1500m and Men's 10,000m. In the women's 1,500 metres, Dutch athletes placed 1st, 2nd, 3rd and 4th; the first such result in Olympic speed skating history by athletes from a single nation.

On 24 November 2017 the silver medal of Olga Fatkulina was disqualified as part of the Russian team doping case. On 1 February 2018, Olga Fatkulina successfully appealed against IOC decision at the Court of Arbitration for Sport. As a result, her silver medal was reinstated.

(WR = World Record, OR = Olympic Record)

=== Medal table ===
* Host nation (Russia)

Rank	Nation	Gold	Silver	Bronze	Total
1	Netherlands	8	7	8	23
2	Poland	1	1	1	3
3	Czech Republic	1	1	0	2
3	South Korea	1	1	0	2
5	China	1	0	0	1
6	Russia*	0	1	2	3
7	Canada	0	1	1	2
Totals (7 entries)		12	12	12	36

=== Men's events ===
Event	Gold		Silver		Bronze	
500 metres	Michel Mulder; Netherlands	69.31	Jan Smeekens; Netherlands	69.32	Ronald Mulder; Netherlands	69.46
1000 metres	Stefan Groothuis; Netherlands	1:08.39	Denny Morrison; Canada	1:08.43	Michel Mulder; Netherlands	1:08.74
1500 metres	Zbigniew Bródka; Poland	1:45.006	Koen Verweij; Netherlands	1:45.009	Denny Morrison; Canada	1:45.22
5000 metres	Sven Kramer; Netherlands	6:10.76; OR	Jan Blokhuijsen; Netherlands	6:15.71	Jorrit Bergsma; Netherlands	6:16.66
10,000 metres	Jorrit Bergsma; Netherlands	12:44.45; OR	Sven Kramer; Netherlands	12:49.02	Bob de Jong; Netherlands	13:07.19
Team pursuit	Netherlands; Jan Blokhuijsen; Sven Kramer; Koen Verweij	3:37.71; OR	South Korea; Joo Hyong-jun; Kim Cheol-min; Lee Seung-hoon	3:40.85	Poland; Zbigniew Bródka; Konrad Niedźwiedzki; Jan Szymański	3:41.94

=== Women's events ===
Event	Gold		Silver		Bronze	
500 metres^{[a]}	Lee Sang-hwa; South Korea	74.70; OR	Olga Fatkulina; Russia	75.06	Margot Boer; Netherlands	75.48
1000 metres	Zhang Hong; China	1:14.02	Ireen Wüst; Netherlands	1:14.69	Margot Boer; Netherlands	1:14.90
1500 metres	Jorien ter Mors; Netherlands	1:53.51; OR	Ireen Wüst; Netherlands	1:54.09	Lotte van Beek; Netherlands	1:54.54
3000 metres	Ireen Wüst; Netherlands	4:00.34	Martina Sáblíková; Czech Republic	4:01.95	Olga Graf; Russia	4:03.47
5000 metres	Martina Sáblíková; Czech Republic	6:51.54	Ireen Wüst; Netherlands	6:54.28	Carien Kleibeuker; Netherlands	6:55.66
Team pursuit	Netherlands; Jorien ter Mors; Marrit Leenstra; Lotte van Beek; Ireen Wüst	2:58.05; OR	Poland; Katarzyna Bachleda-Curuś; Natalia Czerwonka; Luiza Złotkowska; Katarzyna Woźniak	3:05.55	Russia; Olga Graf; Yekaterina Lobysheva; Yekaterina Shikhova; Yuliya Skokova	2:59.73

- ^{women's 500 m} On 24 November 2017, silver medalist from Russia Olga Fatkulina was disqualified for a doping violation. On 1 February 2018, her results were restored as a result of the successful appeal.

== Olympic records broken ==
Event	Date	Round	Name	Country	Time	Record	Ref
Men's 5000 metres	8 February	Pair 10	Sven Kramer	Netherlands	6:10.76	OR	
Women's 500 metres	11 February	Race 2 Pair 17	Lee Sang-hwa	South Korea	37.28	OR	
Women's 500 metres	11 February	Race 1 Pair 18; Race 2 Pair 17	Lee Sang-hwa	South Korea	74.70	OR	
Women's 1500 metres	16 February	Pair 9	Jorien ter Mors	Netherlands	1:53.51	OR	
Men's 10,000 metres	18 February	Pair 6	Jorrit Bergsma	Netherlands	12:44.45	OR	

=== Other records ===
- A total of four podium sweeps were recorded in speed skating, where one nation won the gold, silver and bronze medals in a single event. This was the highest number of podium sweeps to have occurred in speed skating in Olympic history. Every one of these four podium sweeps was won by the Netherlands team.

Date	Event	NOC	Gold	Silver	Bronze	Ref
8 February	Men's 5000m	Netherlands	Sven Kramer	Jan Blokhuijsen	Jorrit Bergsma	
10 February	Men's 500m	Netherlands	Michel Mulder	Jan Smeekens	Ronald Mulder	
16 February	Women's 1500m	Netherlands	Jorien ter Mors	Ireen Wüst	Lotte van Beek	
18 February	Men's 10,000m	Netherlands	Jorrit Bergsma	Sven Kramer	Bob de Jong	

== Qualification ==
Each NOC was allowed to delegate a maximal number of ten men and ten women speed skaters who reached the qualification criteria. A proposal of the Dutch skating association (KNSB) to add an extra athlete, especially for the team pursuit event, was rejected at the congress of the international federation ISU in Kuala Lumpur in June 2012.

=== Qualification times ===
The qualification times were released in July 2013. The women's times stayed the same from Vancouver except for a more stringent standard in the 3000 m, while the men's qualification times have all slightly decreased.

Event	Men	Women
500 m	35.90	39.50
1000 m	1:10.80	1:18.50
1500 m	1:48.50	2:00.00
3000 m	—	4:15.00
5000 m	6:33.00	7:20.00 or 4:10.00 (3000 m)
10,000 m	13:30.00 or 6:28.00 (5000 m)	—

== Participating nations ==
A total of 181 athletes from 23 nations participated (the numbers of athletes are shown in parentheses). Chinese Taipei made its debut in the sport.

- Australia (1)
- Austria (2)
- Belgium (2)
- Canada (17)
- China (10)
- Chinese Taipei (1)
- Czech Republic (2)
- Finland (3)
- France (3)
- Germany (14)
- Hungary (1)
- Italy (6)
- Japan (17)
- Kazakhstan (6)
- Latvia (1)
- Netherlands (20)
- New Zealand (1)
- Norway (9)
- Poland (10)
- Russia (19)
- South Korea (18)
- Sweden (1)
- United States (17)
