= Speed skating at the 2014 Winter Olympics – Women's 3000 metres =

Women's 3000 metres at the XXII Olympic Winter Games
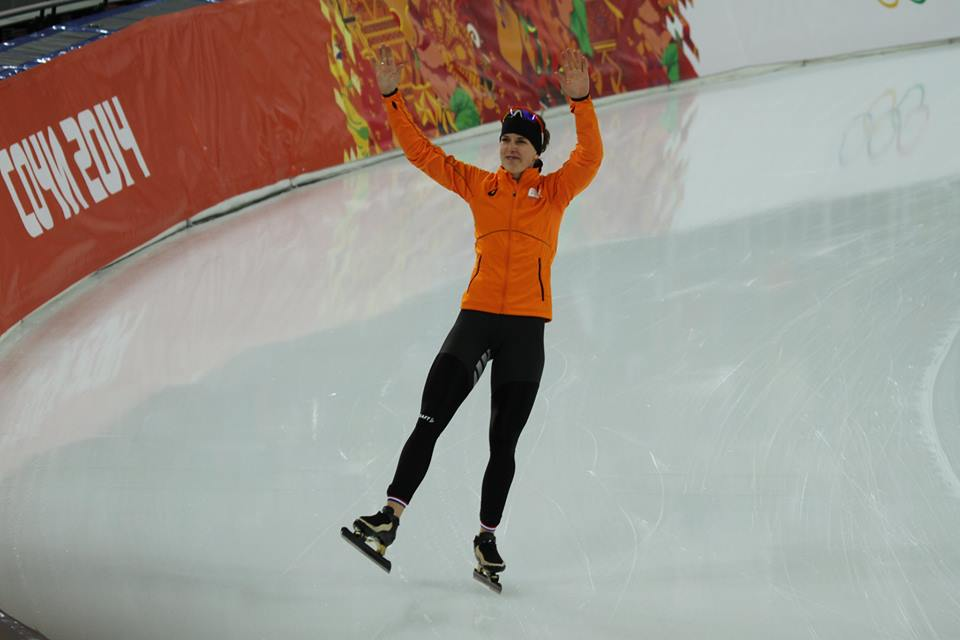
- Ireen Wüst
- Venue: Adler Arena Skating Center
- Date: 9 February 2014
- Competitors: 28 from 13 nations
- Winning time: 4:00.34

Medalists
1st place, gold medalist(s)		Ireen Wüst	Netherlands
2nd place, silver medalist(s)		Martina Sáblíková	Czech Republic
3rd place, bronze medalist(s)		Olga Graf	Russia

The women's 3000 metres speed skating competition of the 2014 Sochi Olympics was held at Adler Arena Skating Center on 9 February 2014 at 15:30 MSK. The competition was won by Ireen Wüst from the Netherlands, who previously won the same distance at the 2006 Winter Olympics. Martina Sáblíková from the Czech Republic, the defending champion, finished second, while Olga Graf won the bronze medal.

The race featured three Olympic Champions at this distance: Sáblíková of 2010, Wüst of 2006, and Claudia Pechstein of 2002. Pechstein, also the Olympic record holder, finished fourth. Stephanie Beckert, the silver medalist of the 2010 Winter Olympics, finished 17th.

Kim Bo-reum in the third pair took an early lead, and her result was subsequently improved by Yuliya Skokova in the 6th pair, Annouk van der Weijden in the 8th pair, and Olga Graf in the 10th pair. Pechstein in the 11th pair was racing better than the Graf's pace for most of the distance, but in the end lost to the Graf's time. In the next two pairs, first Sáblíková and then Wüst took the lead, each of them beating a track record, pushing Pechstein out of the medals. In the last pair, Antoinette de Jong finished seventh, leaving Graf as a surprise medal winner and the first medal winner for Russia at the 2014 Olympics. None of the athletes posted time better than 4 minutes.

== Qualification ==
A total of twenty-eight speed skaters could qualify for this distance, with a maximum of three skaters per country. The top 16 of the 2013–14 ISU Speed Skating World Cup – Women's 3000 and 5000 metres standings after the fourth World Cup race in Berlin secured a spot for their country. Then the additional 12 spots were awarded based on a time ranking of all times skated in the World Cup 3000 metres. A reserve list was also made.

== Records ==
Prior to this competition, the existing world and Olympic records were as follows.

World record	Cindy Klassen (CAN)	3:53.34	Calgary, Canada	18 March 2006
Olympic record	Claudia Pechstein (GER)	3:57.70	Salt Lake City, United States	20 February 2002

At the 2013 World Single Distance Speed Skating Championships the track record was set by Ireen Wüst at 4:02.43.

The following records were set during this competition.

Date	Round	Athlete	Country	Time	Record
9 February	Pair 13	Ireen Wüst	Netherlands	4:00.34	TR
9 February	Pair 12	Martina Sáblíková	Czech Republic	4:01.94	TR

TR = track record

== Results ==
The races were started at 15:30.

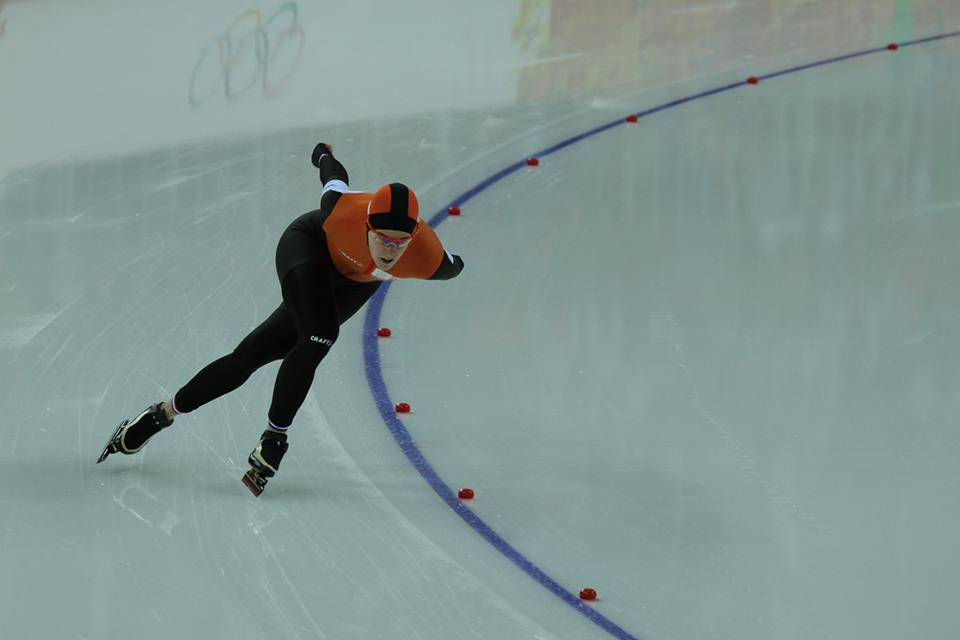
Ireen Wüst

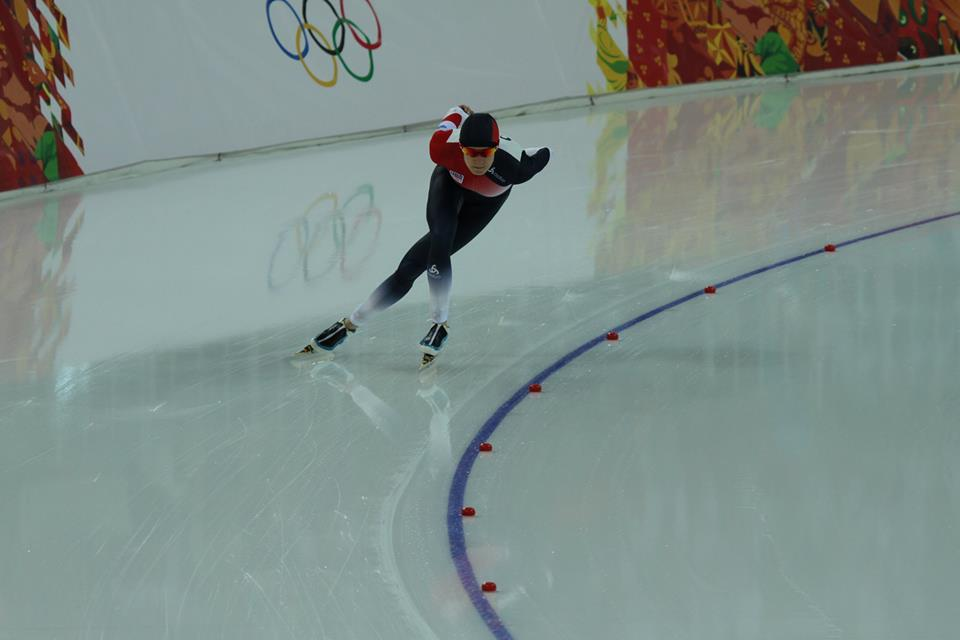
Martina Sáblíková

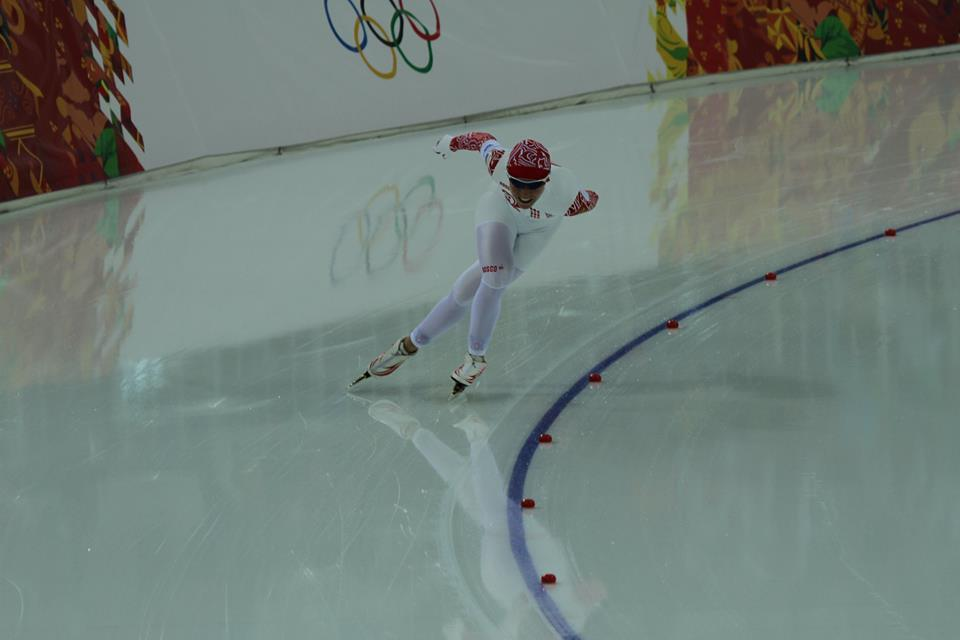
Olga Graf

Rank	Pair	Lane	Name	Country	Time	Time behind	Notes
1st place, gold medalist(s)	13	I	Ireen Wüst	Netherlands	4:00.34	—	TR
2nd place, silver medalist(s)	12	I	Martina Sáblíková	Czech Republic	4:01.94	+1.61	TR
3rd place, bronze medalist(s)	10	I	Olga Graf	Russia	4:03.47	+3.13	
4	11	I	Claudia Pechstein	Germany	4:05.26	+4.92	
5	8	I	Annouk van der Weijden	Netherlands	4:05.75	+5.41	
6	11	O	Ida Njåtun	Norway	4:06.73	+6.39	
7	14	O	Antoinette de Jong	Netherlands	4:06.77	+6.43	
8	6	I	Yuliya Skokova	Russia	4:09.35	+9.02	
9	13	O	Shiho Ishizawa	Japan	4:09.39	+9.05	
10	10	O	Jilleanne Rookard	United States	4:10.01	+9.68	
11	8	O	Bente Kraus	Germany	4:10.16	+9.83	
12	9	I	Jelena Peeters	Belgium	4:10.87	+10.53	
13	3	O	Kim Bo-reum	South Korea	4:12.08	+11.74	
14	5	I	Mari Hemmer	Norway	4:12.21	+11.87	
15	1	I	Shoko Fujimura	Japan	4:12.71	+12.37	
16	9	O	Natalia Czerwonka	Poland	4:13.26	+12.92	
17	4	O	Stephanie Beckert	Germany	4:13.54	+13.21	
18	7	I	Luiza Złotkowska	Poland	4:14.18	+13.85	
19	7	O	Brittany Schussler	Canada	4:14.65	+14.31	
20	1	O	Yekaterina Shikhova	Russia	4:14.97	+14.63	
21	14	I	Masako Hozumi	Japan	4:15.52	+15.18	
22	2	I	Anna Rokita	Austria	4:16.43	+16.09	
23	4	I	Francesca Lollobrigida	Italy	4:16.51	+16.18	
24	3	I	Ivanie Blondin	Canada	4:18.69	+18.36	
25	5	O	Noh Seon-yeong	South Korea	4:19.02	+18.68	
26	2	O	Anna Ringsred	United States	4:21.51	+21.17	
27	6	O	Yang Shin-young	South Korea	4:23.67	+23.33	
	12	O	Katarzyna Bachleda-Curuś	Poland	DQ		

TR = track record, DQ = disqualified
