= Speed skating at the 2014 Winter Olympics – Men's 10,000 metres =

Men's 10,000 metres at the XXII Olympic Winter Games
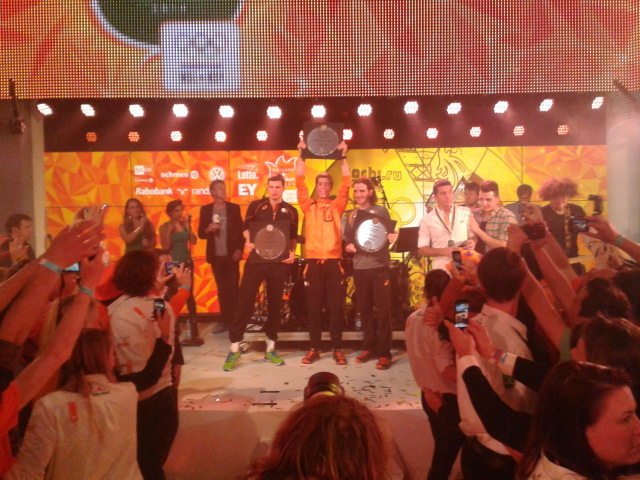
- Honoring of the medalists in the Holland Heineken House
- Venue: Adler Arena Skating Center
- Date: 18 February 2014
- Competitors: 14 from 9 nations
- Winning time: 12:44.45

Medalists
1st place, gold medalist(s)		Jorrit Bergsma; Netherlands
2nd place, silver medalist(s)		Sven Kramer; Netherlands
3rd place, bronze medalist(s)		Bob de Jong; Netherlands

The men's 10,000 metres speed skating competition of the 2014 Sochi Olympics was held at Adler Arena Skating Center on 18 February 2014.

== Qualification ==
A total of sixteen speed skaters could qualify for this distance, with a maximum of three skaters per country. The top 10 of the 2013–14 ISU Speed Skating World Cup – Men's 5000 and 10000 metres standings after the fourth World Cup race in Berlin secured a spot for their country. Then the additional six spots were awarded based on a time ranking of the World Cup 10,000 metres race in Astana. A reserve list was also made.

By virtue of Shane Dobbin's top eight classification at the 2013 World Single Distance Speed Skating Championships – Men's 10000 metres in the pre-olympic season, New Zealand was given a wildcard at the expense of number 16 Jordan Belchos of Canada.

== Records ==
Prior to this competition, the existing world and Olympic records were as follows.

World record	Sven Kramer (NED)	12:41.69	Salt Lake City, United States	10 March 2007
Olympic record	Lee Seung-hoon (KOR)	12:58.55	Vancouver, Canada	23 February 2010

At the 2013 World Single Distance Speed Skating Championships the track record was set by Jorrit Bergsma at 12:57.69.

The following records were set during this competition.

Date	Round	Athlete	Country	Time	Record
18 February	Pair 6	Jorrit Bergsma	Netherlands	12:44.45	OR, TR

OR = Olympic record, TR = track record

== Results ==
During the Olympics, the Norwegian speed skaters Håvard Bøkko and Sverre Lunde Pedersen, who were all on the original start list, decided not to start the 10,000 meters to focus on the team pursuit that would be held a few days later. Norwegian speed skater Simen Spieler Nilsen, on the reserve list for the 10,000 meter, did not start for the same reason. Russian speed skater Ivan Skobrev and French Alexis Contin also did not start. The open places were taken by Moritz Geisreiter, Patrick Meek and Sebastian Druszkiewicz.

The races were started at 17:00.

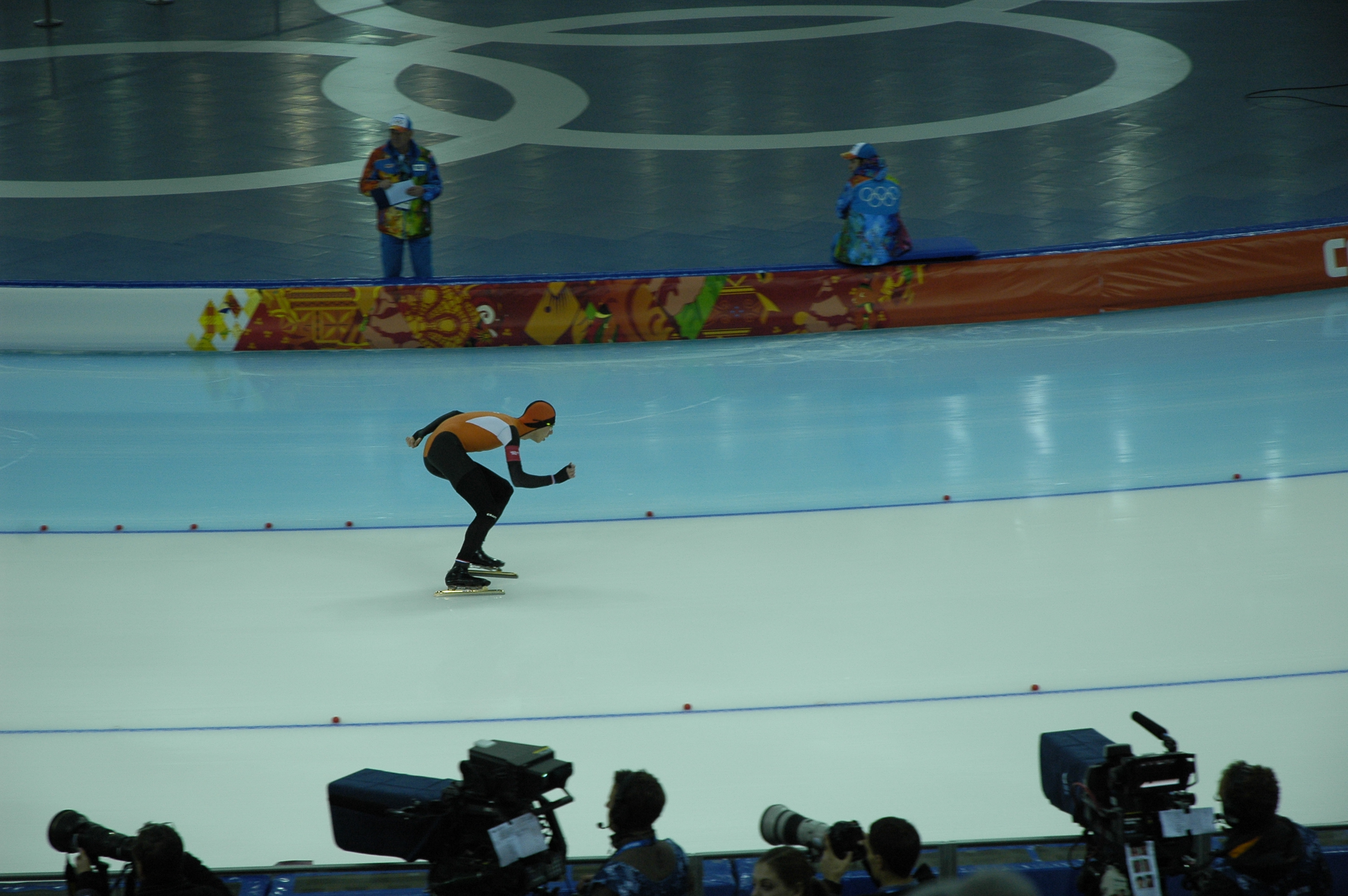
Gold medalist Jorrit Bergsma

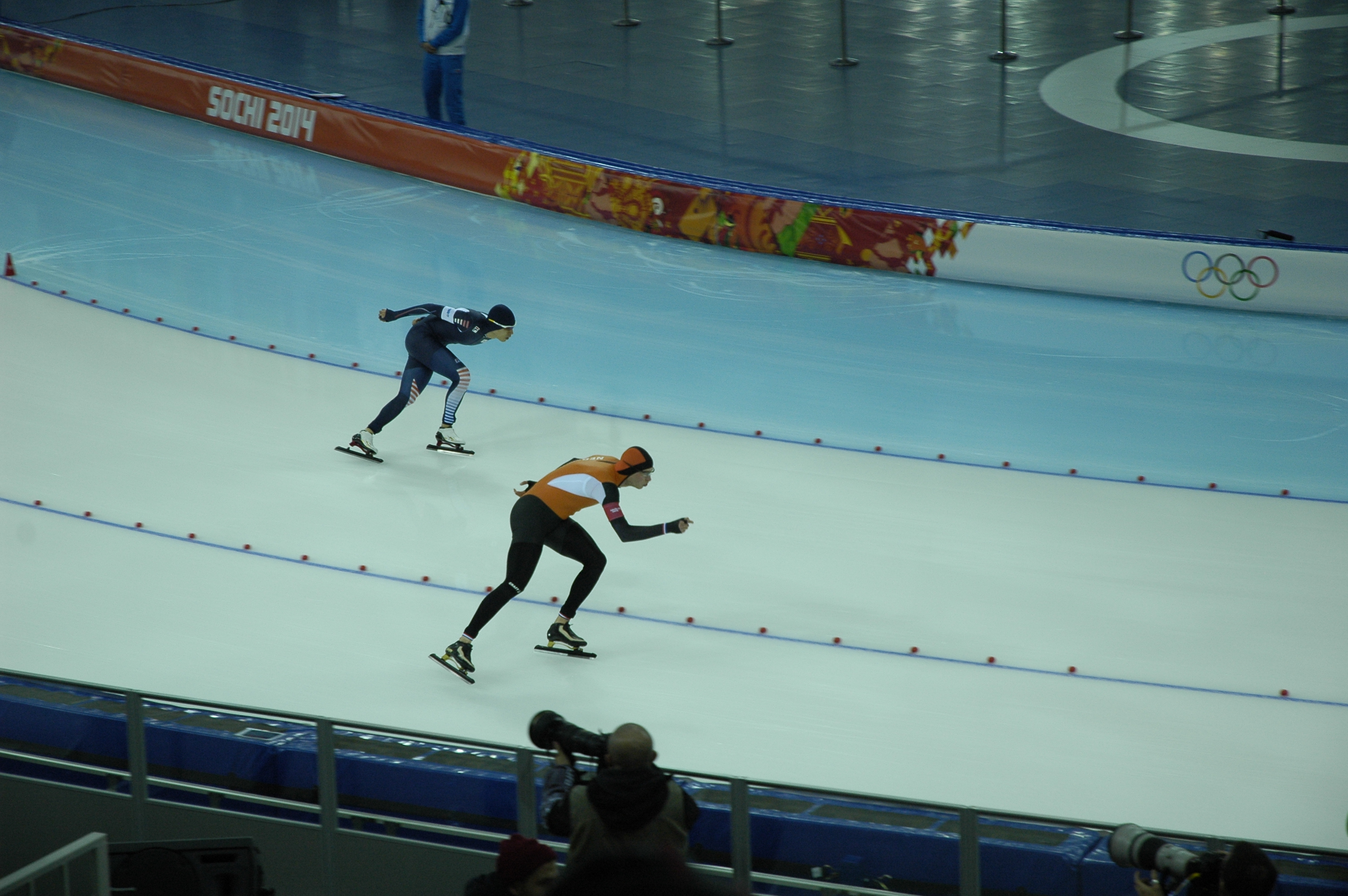
Silver medalist Sven Kramer

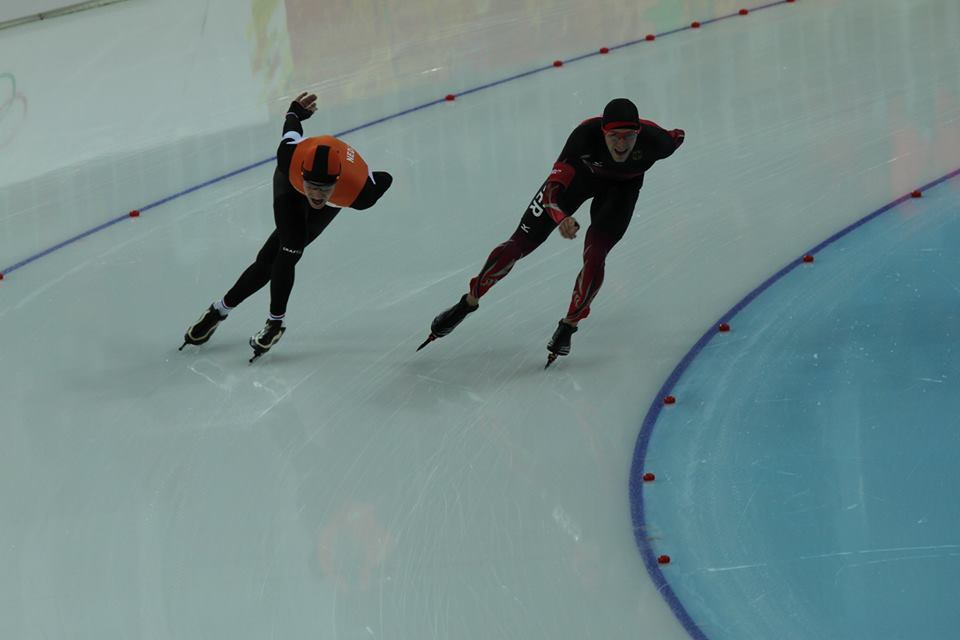
Bronze medalist Bob de Jong (left)

Rank	Pair	Lane	Name	Country	Time	Time behind	Notes
1st place, gold medalist(s)	6	O	Jorrit Bergsma	Netherlands	12:44.45	—	OR, TR
2nd place, silver medalist(s)	7	O	Sven Kramer	Netherlands	12:49.02	+4.57	
3rd place, bronze medalist(s)	5	I	Bob de Jong	Netherlands	13:07.19	+22.74	
4	7	I	Lee Seung-hoon	South Korea	13:11.68	+27.23	
5	6	I	Bart Swings	Belgium	13:13.99	+29.54	
6	4	O	Patrick Beckert	Germany	13:14.26	+29.81	
7	2	O	Shane Dobbin	New Zealand	13:16.42	+31.97	
8	2	I	Moritz Geisreiter	Germany	13:20.26	+35.81	
9	3	I	Yevgeny Seryayev	Russia	13:28.61	+44.16	
10	3	O	Emery Lehman	United States	13:28.67	+44.22	
11	1	O	Patrick Meek	United States	13:28.72	+44.27	
12	4	I	Dmitry Babenko	Kazakhstan	13:33.18	+48.73	
13	5	O	Alexej Baumgärtner	Germany	13:44.39	+59.94	
14	1	I	Sebastian Druszkiewicz	Poland	13:45.31	+1:00.86	

OR = Olympic record, TR = track record
