= 2013–14 ISU Speed Skating World Cup – Women's 3000 and 5000 metres =

The 3000 and 5000 meters distances for women in the 2013–14 ISU Speed Skating World Cup was contested over six races on six occasions, out of a total of six World Cup occasions for the season, with the first occasion taking place in Calgary, Alberta, Canada, on 8–10 November 2013, and the final occasion taking place in Heerenveen, Netherlands, on 14–16 March 2014. Five of the races were over 3000 metres, and one race was over 5000 metres.

On the first competition weekend in Calgary, Antoinette de Jong of the Netherlands improved the 3000 metres world record for juniors with a time of 4:00.56. The next weekend, in Salt Lake City, she improved it again, this time with a time of 3:59.49, becoming the first junior to achieve a time under four minutes for the distance, a result that was good enough for a bronze medal.

Martina Sáblíková of the Czech Republic successfully defended her title from the previous season, while Claudia Pechstein of Germany repeated her second place, and Yvonne Nauta of the Netherlands came third.

== Top three ==
| Position | Athlete | Points | Previous season |
|---|---|---|---|
| 1 | (Czech Republic) Martina Sáblíková | 550 | 1st |
| 2 | (Germany) Claudia Pechstein | 416 | 2nd |
| 3 | (Netherlands) Yvonne Nauta | 326 | – |

== Race medallists ==
| Occasion # | Location | Date | Distance | Gold | Time | Silver | Time | Bronze | Time | Report |
|---|---|---|---|---|---|---|---|---|---|---|
| 1 | Calgary, Alberta, Canada | 8 November | 3000 metres | Claudia Pechstein; Germany | 3:59.04 | Martina Sáblíková; Czech Republic | 3:59.39 | Ireen Wüst; Netherlands | 3:59.68 | |
| 2 | Salt Lake City, United States | 15 November | 3000 metres | Martina Sáblíková; Czech Republic | 3:57.79 | Claudia Pechstein; Germany | 3:57.80 | Antoinette de Jong; Netherlands | 3:59.49; WRJ | |
| 3 | Astana, Kazakhstan | 29 November | 5000 metres | Martina Sáblíková; Czech Republic | 6:59.88 | Claudia Pechstein; Germany | 7:01.10 | Yvonne Nauta; Netherlands | 7:04.64 | |
| 4 | Berlin, Germany | 6 December | 3000 metres | Martina Sáblíková; Czech Republic | 4:02.25 | Claudia Pechstein; Germany | 4:02.96 | Ireen Wüst; Netherlands | 4:03.50 | |
| 5 | Inzell, Germany | 8 March | 3000 metres | Ireen Wüst; Netherlands | 4:01.52 | Martina Sáblíková; Czech Republic | 4:04.00 | Yvonne Nauta; Netherlands | 4:04.44 | |
| 6 | Heerenveen, Netherlands | 15 March | 3000 metres | Annouk van der Weijden; Netherlands | 4:02.22 | Yvonne Nauta; Netherlands | 4:03.36 | Olga Graf; Russia | 4:03.79 | |

== Standings ==
Standings as of 15 March 2014 (end of the season).

| # | Name | Nat. | CAL | SLC | AST | BER | INZ | HVN | Total |
|---|---|---|---|---|---|---|---|---|---|
| 1 | Martina Sáblíková | (Czech Republic) | 80 | 100 | 100 | 100 | 80 | 90 | 550 |
| 2 | Claudia Pechstein | (Germany) | 100 | 80 | 80 | 80 | 40 | 36 | 416 |
| 3 | Yvonne Nauta | (Netherlands) | 45 | 21 | 70 | | 70 | 120 | 326 |
| 4 | Olga Graf | (Russia) | 21 | 18 | 40 | 30 | 60 | 105 | 274 |
| 5 | Jorien Voorhuis | (Netherlands) | 50 | 60 | | 45 | 50 | 40 | 245 |
| 6 | Ireen Wüst | (Netherlands) | 70 | | | 70 | 100 | | 240 |
| 7 | Katarzyna Bachleda-Curuś | (Poland) | 35 | 40 | 35 | 60 | 35 | 32 | 237 |
| 8 | Antoinette de Jong | (Netherlands) | 60 | 70 | | 50 | | 45 | 225 |
| 9 | Annouk van der Weijden | (Netherlands) | | 19 | 23 | | 32 | 150 | 224 |
| 10 | Ida Njåtun | (Norway) | 40 | 45 | 30 | 40 | 45 | 21 | 221 |
| 11 | Linda de Vries | (Netherlands) | 30 | 50 | | 35 | | 75 | 190 |
| 12 | Shiho Ishizawa | (Japan) | 27 | 25 | 60 | 16 | 30 | 24 | 182 |
| 13 | Masako Hozumi | (Japan) | 23 | 35 | 45 | 25 | 10 | 14 | 152 |
| 14 | Luiza Złotkowska | (Poland) | 32 | 30 | 18 | 18 | 21 | 28 | 147 |
| 15 | Nana Takagi | (Japan) | 25 | 16 | 50 | 14 | 12 | 18 | 135 |
| 16 | Ayaka Kikuchi | (Japan) | 9 | 32 | 25 | 10 | 16 | 12 | 104 |
| 17 | Bente Kraus | (Germany) | 7 | 27 | 4 | 12 | 25 | 16 | 91 |
| 18 | Jilleanne Rookard | (United States) | 15 | 27 | 21 | 21 | | | 84 |
| 19 | Natalia Czerwonka | (Poland) | 6 | 9 | | 27 | 14 | | 56 |
| 20 | Ivanie Blondin | (Canada) | 10 | | 3 | 23 | 18 | | 54 |
| 21 | Mari Hemmer | (Norway) | | 7 | 6 | 19 | 19 | | 51 |
| 22 | Jelena Peeters | (Belgium) | 5 | 15 | | 4 | 23 | | 47 |
| 23 | Francesca Lollobrigida | (Italy) | 4 | 11 | 5 | 11 | 15 | | 46 |
| 24 | Yuliya Skokova | (Russia) | 14 | 4 | | | 27 | | 45 |
| 25 | Brittany Schussler | (Canada) | 16 | 14 | | 15 | | | 45 |
| 26 | Kim Bo-reum | (South Korea) | 18 | 12 | 11 | | | | 41 |
| 27 | Stephanie Beckert | (Germany) | 12 | 5 | 15 | 3 | 6 | | 41 |
| 28 | Carlijn Achtereekte | (Netherlands) | | | 32 | | | | 32 |
| 28 | Jorien ter Mors | (Netherlands) | | | | 32 | | | 32 |
| 30 | Katarzyna Woźniak | (Poland) | 19 | 10 | | 2 | | | 31 |
| 31 | Anna Chernova | (Russia) | 3 | | 7 | 9 | 11 | | 30 |
| 32 | Carien Kleibeuker | (Netherlands) | | | 27 | | | | 27 |
| 33 | Rixt Meijer | (Netherlands) | | | 19 | | | | 19 |
| 34 | Jennifer Bay | (Germany) | 11 | 6 | | 1 | | | 18 |
| 35 | Maria Lamb | (United States) | | | 9 | | 3 | | 12 |
| 36 | Isabell Ost | (Germany) | | | | 5 | 7 | | 12 |
| 37 | Yevgeniya Dmitriyeva | (Russia) | | | | | 9 | | 9 |
| 38 | Liu Jing | (China) | | | | 7 | | | 7 |
| 39 | Anna Rokita | (Austria) | 1 | | | 6 | | | 7 |
| 40 | Yekaterina Shikhova | (Russia) | | | | | 5 | | 5 |
| 41 | Shoko Fujimura | (Japan) | | | | | 4 | | 4 |
| 42 | Shin Young-yang | (South Korea) | | 3 | 1 | | | | 4 |
| 43 | Miho Takagi | (Japan) | 2 | 2 | | | | | 4 |
| 44 | Fuyo Matsuoka | (Japan) | | | 2 | | | | 2 |
| 44 | Anna Ringsred | (United States) | | | | | 2 | | 2 |
| 46 | Marije Joling | (Netherlands) | | | | | 1 | | 1 |
| 46 | Noh Seon-yeong | (South Korea) | | 1 | | | | | 1 |
