= Speed skating at the 2014 Winter Olympics – Men's 5000 metres =

Men's 5000 metres at the XXII Olympic Winter Games
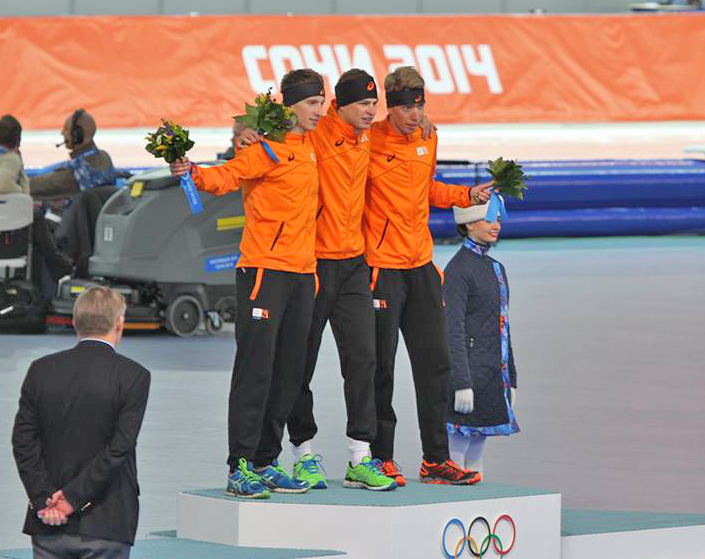
- The podium
- Venue: Adler Arena Skating Center
- Date: 8 February 2014
- Competitors: 26 from 14 nations
- Winning time: 6:10.76 OR

Medalists
| 1st place, gold medalist(s) | | Sven Kramer; Netherlands |
| 2nd place, silver medalist(s) | | Jan Blokhuijsen; Netherlands |
| 3rd place, bronze medalist(s) | | Jorrit Bergsma; Netherlands |

The men's 5000 metres speed skating competition of the 2014 Sochi Olympics was held at 15:30 MSK on 8 February 2014 at the Adler Arena Skating Center. All the medals were won by Dutch athletes — Sven Kramer, who set a new Olympic record, Jan Blokhuijsen (silver), and Jorrit Bergsma (bronze).

Jan Szymański in the second pair set the time of 6:26.35, which was only beaten by both athletes in the 6th pair, and Håvard Bøkko set the new leading time. Already in the next, 7th pair Denis Yuskov beat Bøkko' s time by more than three seconds, and in the middle of the distance developed even a bigger lead. In the next pair, Ivan Skobrev, the bronze medalist of the 2010 Olympics, failed to improve Yuskov's result and was provisionally left second. In the 10th pair, Sven Kramer, widely regarded as the main gold medal contender, initially was losing to the Yuskov's pace, but then accelerated and set the new Olympic record. The athletes in the 11th and 12th pairs all lost to Kramer but beat Yuskov, finally taking places from the second to the fifth, with all three Dutch athletes in medal positions. Only one pair remained, featuring Lee Seung-hoon, the 2010 silver medalist and the 2010 champion at 10000 m. However, he started to lose to Kramer's pace early in the race, and ended up twelfth, losing also to Patrick Beckert from his pair.

== Qualification ==
A total of twenty-eight speed skaters could qualify for this distance, with a maximum of three skaters per country. The top 16 of the 2013–14 ISU Speed Skating World Cup – Men's 5000 and 10000 metres standings after the fourth World Cup race in Berlin secured a spot for their country. Then the additional 12 spots were awarded based on a time ranking of all times skated in the World Cup 5000 metres. A reserve list was also made. Each athlete qualifying must have also hit a maximum time standard of 6:33.00 over the distance.

Alexis Contin of France and Haralds Silovs of Latvia qualified but withdrew. They were not replaced.

== Records ==
Prior to this competition, the existing world and Olympic records were as follows.

| World record | Sven Kramer (NED) | 6:03.32 | Calgary, Canada | 17 November 2007 |
| Olympic record | Sven Kramer (NED) | 6:14.60 | Vancouver, Canada | 13 February 2010 |

At the 2013 World Single Distance Speed Skating Championships the track record was set by Sven Kramer at 6:14.41.

The following records were set during this competition.

| Date | Round | Athlete | Country | Time | Record |
|---|---|---|---|---|---|
| 8 February | Pair 10 | Sven Kramer | Netherlands | 6:10.76 | OR, TR |

OR = Olympic record, TR = track record

== Competition schedule ==
All times are (UTC+4).

| Date | Time | Event |
|---|---|---|
| 8 February | 15:30 | 5000 m men's final |

== Results ==
The races were started at 15:30. On 24 November 2017, Russian skater Aleksandr Rumyantsev was disqualified for a doping violation.

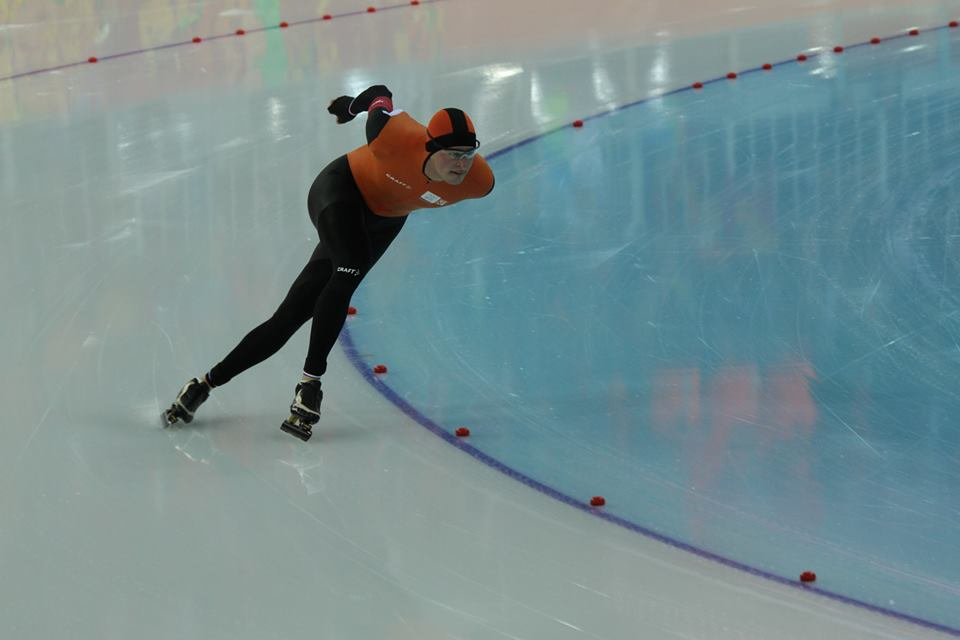
Sven Kramer

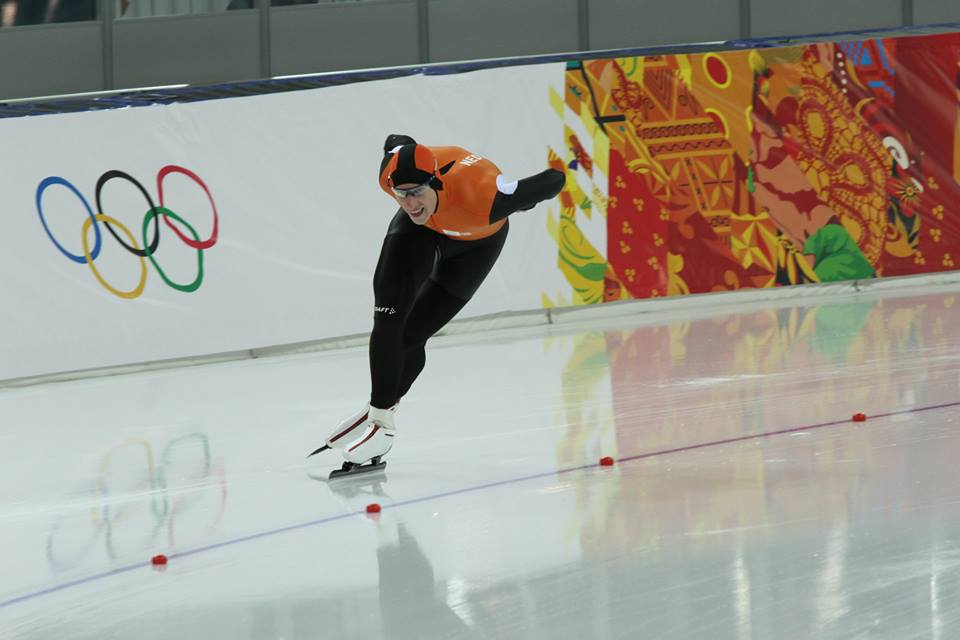
Jan Blokhuijsen

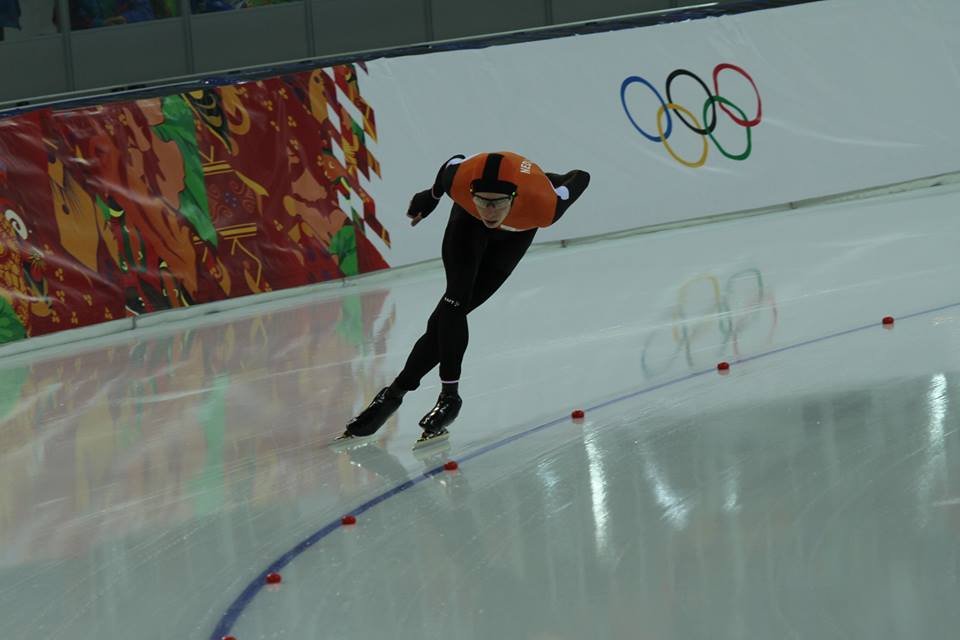
Jorrit Bergsma

| Rank | Pair | Lane | Name | Country | Time | Time behind | Notes |
|---|---|---|---|---|---|---|---|
| 1st place, gold medalist(s) | 10 | O | Sven Kramer | Netherlands | 6:10.76 | — | OR, TR |
| 2nd place, silver medalist(s) | 12 | I | Jan Blokhuijsen | Netherlands | 6:15.71 | +4.95 | |
| 3rd place, bronze medalist(s) | 11 | I | Jorrit Bergsma | Netherlands | 6:16.66 | +5.90 | |
| 4 | 12 | O | Bart Swings | Belgium | 6:17.79 | +7.03 | |
| 5 | 11 | O | Sverre Lunde Pedersen | Norway | 6:18.84 | +8.08 | |
| 6 | 7 | O | Denis Yuskov | Russia | 6:19.51 | +8.75 | |
| 7 | 8 | O | Ivan Skobrev | Russia | 6:19.83 | +9.07 | |
| 8 | 13 | I | Patrick Beckert | Germany | 6:21.18 | +10.42 | |
| 9 | 6 | O | Håvard Bøkko | Norway | 6:22.83 | +12:07 | |
| 10 | 6 | I | Moritz Geisreiter | Germany | 6:24.79 | +14.03 | |
| 11 | 9 | O | Aleksandr Rumyantsev | Russia | 6:24.93 | +14.17 | |
| 12 | 13 | O | Lee Seung-hoon | South Korea | 6:25.61 | +14.85 | |
| 13 | 2 | O | Jan Szymański | Poland | 6:26.35 | +15.59 | |
| 14 | 8 | I | Shane Dobbin | New Zealand | 6:26.90 | +16.14 | |
| 15 | 9 | I | Dmitry Babenko | Kazakhstan | 6:28.26 | +17.50 | |
| 16 | 7 | I | Emery Lehman | United States | 6:29.94 | +19.18 | |
| 17 | 3 | O | Andrea Giovannini | Italy | 6:30.84 | +20.08 | |
| 18 | 3 | I | Ewen Fernandez | France | 6:31.08 | +20.32 | |
| 19 | 10 | I | Jonathan Kuck | United States | 6:31.53 | +20.77 | |
| 20 | 1 | O | Patrick Meek | United States | 6:32.94 | +22.18 | |
| 21 | 5 | I | Alexej Baumgärtner | Germany | 6:34.35 | +23.58 | |
| 22 | 2 | I | Mathieu Giroux | Canada | 6:35.77 | +25.01 | |
| 23 | 1 | I | Sebastian Druszkiewicz | Poland | 6:37.16 | +26.40 | |
| 24 | 4 | O | Kim Cheol-min | South Korea | 6:37.28 | +26.52 | |
| 25 | 5 | O | Simen Spieler Nilsen | Norway | 6:42.47 | +31.71 | |
| 26 | 4 | I | Shane Williamson | Japan | 6:42.88 | +32.12 | |

OR = Olympic record, TR = track record
