= Speed skating at the 2014 Winter Olympics – Men's team pursuit =

Men's team pursuit at the XXII Olympic Winter Games
- Pictogram of speed skating
- Venue: Adler Arena Skating Center
- Date: 21–22 February 2014
- Competitors: 24 from 8 nations
- Winning time: 3:37.71

Medalists
1st place, gold medalist(s)		Jan Blokhuijsen; Sven Kramer; Koen Verweij	Netherlands
2nd place, silver medalist(s)		Joo Hyong-jun; Kim Cheol-min; Lee Seung-hoon	South Korea
3rd place, bronze medalist(s)		Zbigniew Bródka; Konrad Niedźwiedzki; Jan Szymański	Poland

The men's team pursuit speed skating competition of the 2014 Sochi Olympics was held at Adler Arena Skating Center on 21 and 22 February 2014. The distance was 3,200 metres.

== Qualification ==
A total of eight teams of three or four speed skaters could qualify for this team event. The top 6 of the 2013–14 ISU Speed Skating World Cup – Men's team pursuit standings after the World Cup race in Berlin secured a spot in the Olympics. Of the teams outside the top six, France qualified based on the time ranking and Russia qualified as hosts. A reserve list was also made.

== Records ==
Prior to this competition, the existing world and Olympic records were as follows.

World record	Netherlands; Koen Verweij; Jan Blokhuijsen; Sven Kramer	3:35.60	Salt Lake City, United States	16 November 2013
Olympic record	Netherlands; Jan Blokhuijsen; Sven Kramer; Simon Kuipers	3:39.95	Vancouver, Canada	27 February 2010

At the 2013 World Single Distance Speed Skating Championships the track record was at 3:42.03 by the team of the Netherlands consisting of Jan Blokhuijsen, Sven Kramer, and Koen Verweij.

The following records were set during this competition.

Date	Round	Athlete	Country	Time	Record
22 February	Final A	Jan Blokhuijsen; Sven Kramer; Koen Verweij	Netherlands	3:37.71	OR, TR
21 February	Quarterfinal 2	Joo Hyong-jun; Kim Cheol-min; Lee Seung-hoon	South Korea	3:40.84	TR
21 February	Semifinal 2	Jan Blokhuijsen; Sven Kramer; Koen Verweij	Netherlands	3:40.79	TR

OR = Olympic record, TR = track record

== Results ==
On 24 November 2017, the Russian team were disqualified after Aleksandr Rumyantsev was sanctioned for a doping violation. On 22 December, Ivan Skobrev was disqualified as well. In January 2018, they successfully appealed against the lifetime ban as well as decision to disqualify them from Sochi Olympics at the court of arbitration for sport. Their results were reinstated.

=== Bracket ===
Quarterfinal
1	Netherlands	3:44.48
7	France	3:53.17
4	Norway	3:43.19
5	Poland	3:42.78
3	United States	3:46.82
6	Canada	3:43.30
2	South Korea	3:40.84
8	Russia	3:44.22

Semifinal
1	Netherlands	3:40.79
5	Poland	3:52.08
6	Canada	3:45.28
2	South Korea	3:42.32

Final
1	Netherlands	3:37.71
2	South Korea	3:40.85
Third place
5	Poland	3:41.94
6	Canada	3:44.27

=== Quarterfinals ===
The quarterfinals were held on 21 February.

Rank	Country	Name	Time	Deficit	Notes
Quarterfinal 1
1	Canada	Mathieu Giroux; Lucas Makowsky; Denny Morrison	3:43.30		Semifinal 1
2	United States	Shani Davis; Brian Hansen; Jonathan Kuck	3:46.82	+3.52	Final D
Quarterfinal 2
1	South Korea	Joo Hyong-jun; Kim Cheol-min; Lee Seung-hoon	3:40.84		Semifinal 1 TR
2	Russia	Aleksandr Rumyantsev; Denis Yuskov; Ivan Skobrev	3:44.22	+3.38	
Quarterfinal 3
1	Poland	Zbigniew Bródka; Konrad Niedźwiedzki; Jan Szymański	3:42.78		Semifinal 2
2	Norway	Håvard Bøkko; Håvard Lorentzen; Sverre Lunde Pedersen	3:43.19	+0.41	Final C
Quarterfinal 4
1	Netherlands	Jan Blokhuijsen; Sven Kramer; Koen Verweij	3:44.48		Semifinal 2
2	France	Alexis Contin; Ewen Fernandez; Benjamin Macé	3:53.17	+8.69	Final D

TR = track record

=== Semifinals ===
The semifinals were held on 21 February.

Rank	Country	Name	Time	Deficit	Notes
Semifinal 1
1	South Korea	Joo Hyong-jun; Kim Cheol-min; Lee Seung-hoon	3:42.32		Final A
2	Canada	Mathieu Giroux; Lucas Makowsky; Denny Morrison	3:45.28	+2.96	Final B
Semifinal 2
1	Netherlands	Jan Blokhuijsen; Sven Kramer; Koen Verweij	3:40.79		Final A TR
2	Poland	Zbigniew Bródka; Konrad Niedźwiedzki; Jan Szymański	3:52.08	+11.29	Final B

TR = track record

=== Finals ===
The finals were held on 22 February.

Rank	Country	Name	Time	Deficit	Notes
Final A
1st place, gold medalist(s)	Netherlands	Jan Blokhuijsen; Sven Kramer; Koen Verweij	3:37.71		OR, TR
2nd place, silver medalist(s)	South Korea	Joo Hyong-jun; Kim Cheol-min; Lee Seung-hoon	3:40.85	+3.14	
Final B
3rd place, bronze medalist(s)	Poland	Zbigniew Bródka; Konrad Niedźwiedzki; Jan Szymański	3:41.94		
4	Canada	Mathieu Giroux; Lucas Makowsky; Denny Morrison	3:44.27	+2.33	
Final C
5	Norway	Håvard Bøkko; Sverre Lunde Pedersen; Simen Spieler Nilsen	3:44.91		
6	Russia	Aleksandr Rumyantsev; Aleksey Yesin; Denis Yuskov	3:49.85	+4.94	
Final D
7	United States	Brian Hansen; Jonathan Kuck; Joey Mantia	3:46.50		
8	France	Alexis Contin; Ewen Fernandez; Benjamin Macé	3:51.76	+5.26	

OR = Olympic record, TR = track record
