= Speed skating at the 2014 Winter Olympics – Women's 1500 metres =

Women's 1500 metres at the XXII Olympic Winter Games
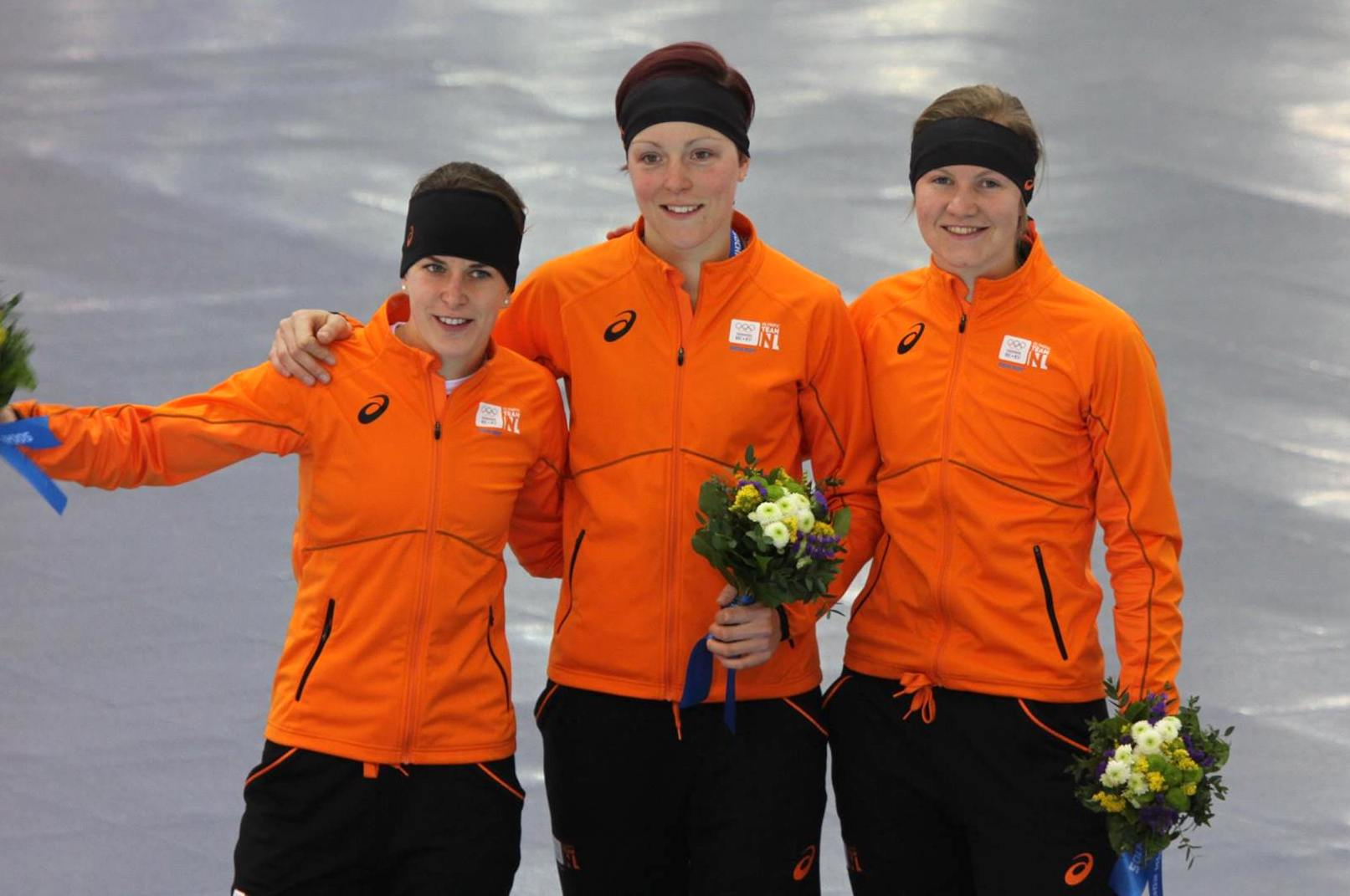
- Podium
- Venue: Adler Arena Skating Center
- Date: 16 February 2014
- Competitors: 36 from 13 nations
- Winning time: 1:53.51

Medalists
1st place, gold medalist(s)		Jorien ter Mors	Netherlands
2nd place, silver medalist(s)		Ireen Wüst	Netherlands
3rd place, bronze medalist(s)		Lotte van Beek	Netherlands

The women's 1500 metres speed skating competition of the 2014 Sochi Olympics was held at Adler Arena Skating Center on 16 February 2014.

== Qualification ==
A total of thirty-six speed skaters could qualify for this distance, with a maximum of four skaters per country. The top 20 of the 2013–14 ISU Speed Skating World Cup – Women's 1500 metres standings after the fourth World Cup race in Berlin secured a spot for their country. Then the additional 16 spots were awarded based on a time ranking of all times skated in the World Cup. A reserve list was also made.

== Records ==
Prior to this competition, the existing world and Olympic records were as follows.

World record	Cindy Klassen (CAN)	1:51.79	Salt Lake City, United States	20 November 2005
Olympic record	Anni Friesinger (GER)	1:54.02	Salt Lake City, United States	20 February 2002

At the 2013 World Single Distance Speed Skating Championships the track record was set by Ireen Wüst at 1:55.38.

The following records were set during this competition.

Date	Round	Athlete	Country	Time	Record
16 February	Pair 9	Jorien ter Mors	Netherlands	1:53.51	OR, TR

OR = Olympic record, TR = track record

== Results ==
On 24 November 2017, Russian athlete Olga Fatkulina was disqualified for a doping offence.

The races were started at 18:00.

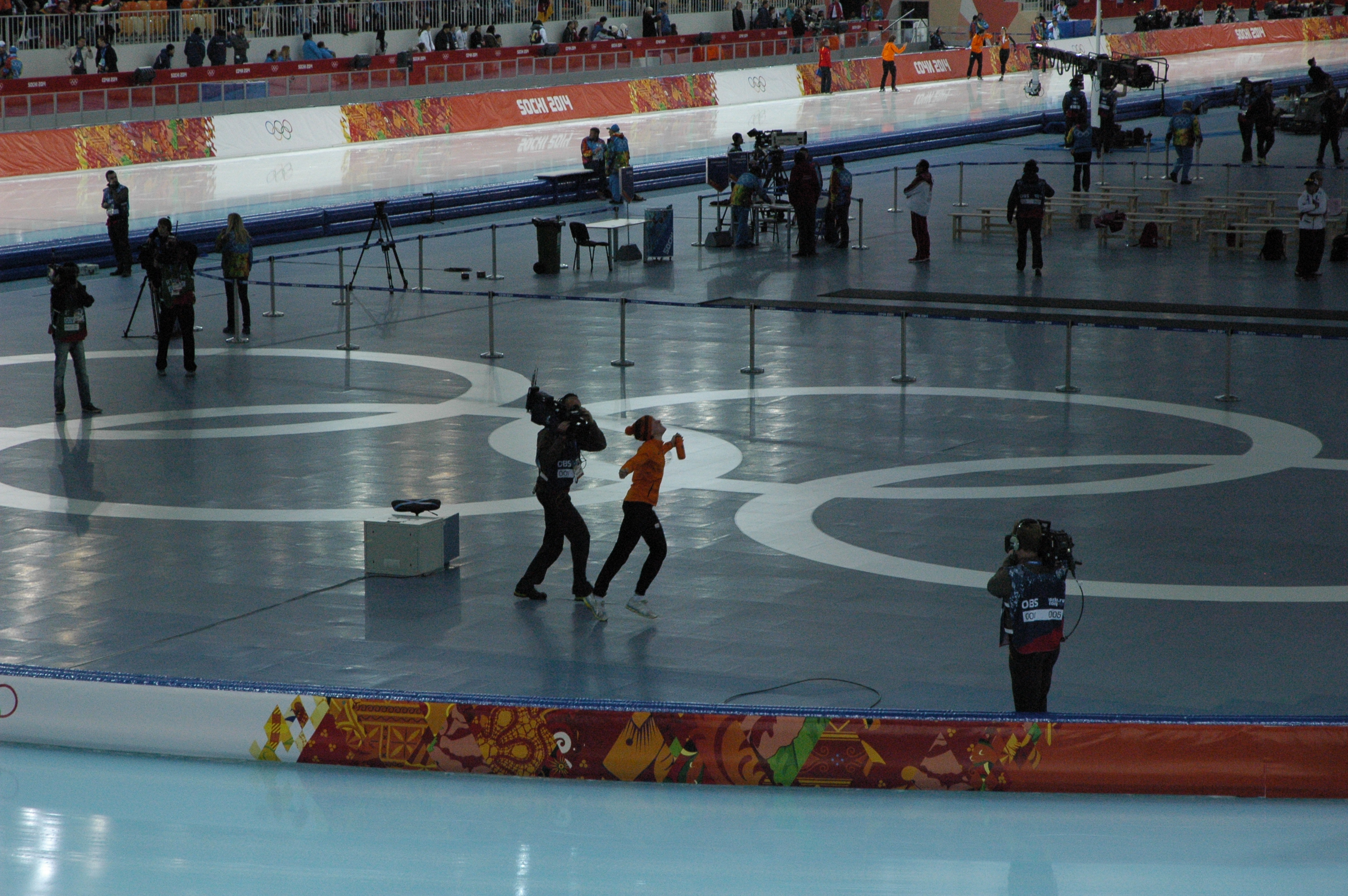
Jorien ter Mors happy after winning gold

Rank	Pair	Lane	Name	Country	Time	Time behind	Notes
1st place, gold medalist(s)	9	I	Jorien ter Mors	Netherlands	1:53.51	—	OR, TR
2nd place, silver medalist(s)	15	I	Ireen Wüst	Netherlands	1:54.09	+0.58	
3rd place, bronze medalist(s)	18	O	Lotte van Beek	Netherlands	1:54.54	+1.03	
4	13	I	Marrit Leenstra	Netherlands	1:56.40	+2.89	
5	16	O	Yuliya Skokova	Russia	1:56.45	+2.94	
6	16	I	Katarzyna Bachleda-Curuś	Poland	1:57.18	+3.67	
7	14	I	Heather Richardson	United States	1:57.60	+4.09	
8	17	O	Yekaterina Lobysheva	Russia	1:57.70	+4.19	
DSQ	5	O	Olga Fatkulina	Russia	1:57.88	+4.37	
10	11	I	Yekaterina Shikhova	Russia	1:58.09	+4.58	
11	11	O	Luiza Złotkowska	Poland	1:58.18	+4.67	
12	15	O	Ida Njåtun	Norway	1:58.21	+4.70	
13	12	O	Karolína Erbanová	Czech Republic	1:58.23	+4.72	
14	17	I	Brittany Bowe	United States	1:58.31	+4.80	
15	10	O	Natalia Czerwonka	Poland	1:58.46	+4.95	
16	7	I	Kali Christ	Canada	1:58.63	+5.12	
17	8	I	Christine Nesbitt	Canada	1:58.67	+5.16	
18	8	O	Jilleanne Rookard	United States	1:59.15	+5.64	
19	18	I	Claudia Pechstein	Germany	1:59.47	+5.96	
20	2	I	Jelena Peeters	Belgium	1:59.73	+6.22	
21	2	O	Kim Bo-reum	South Korea	1:59.78	+6.27	
22	6	O	Misaki Oshigiri	Japan	2:00.03	+6.52	
23	3	O	Zhao Xin	China	2:00.27	+6.76	
24	14	O	Monique Angermüller	Germany	2:00.32	+6.81	
25	13	O	Maki Tabata	Japan	2:00.64	+7.13	
26	12	I	Brittany Schussler	Canada	2:00.65	+7.14	
27	6	I	Li Qishi	China	2:00.89	+7.38	
28	1	I	Yekaterina Aydova	Kazakhstan	2:00.93	+7.42	
29	3	I	Noh Seon-yeong	South Korea	2:01.07	+7.56	
30	7	O	Gabriele Hirschbichler	Germany	2:01.18	+7.67	
31	9	O	Ayaka Kikuchi	Japan	2:01.29	+7.78	
32	10	I	Nana Takagi	Japan	2:02.16	+8.65	
33	5	I	Hege Bøkko	Norway	2:02.53	+9.02	
34	1	O	Vanessa Bittner	Austria	2:02.84	+9.33	
35	4	O	Brianne Tutt	Canada	2:03.69	+10.18	
36	4	I	Yang Shin-young	South Korea	2:04.13	+10.62	

OR = Olympic record, TR = track record
