= Sebastian Druszkiewicz =

Polish speed skater (born 1986)

Sebastian Druszkiewicz (born 14 June 1986) is a Polish speed skater representing The Czech Republic. He was born in Zakopane. He competed at the 2010 Winter Olympics in Vancouver, where he placed 14th in men's 10,000 metres. He competed at the 2014 Winter Olympics in Sochi, in 5,000 metres and 10,000 metres.
