= Netherlands at the 2014 Winter Olympics =

- Flag of the Netherlands
- IOC code: NED
- NOC: Dutch Olympic Committee*; Dutch Sports Federation
- Website: www.nocnsf.nl (in Dutch)

in Sochi
- Competitors: 41 in 4 sports
- Flag bearer (opening): Jorien ter Mors
- Flag bearer (closing): Bob de Jong
- Medals Ranked 5th: Gold 8 Silver 7 Bronze 9 Total 24

Winter Olympics appearances (overview)
- 1928; 1932; 1936; 1948; 1952; 1956; 1960; 1964; 1968; 1972; 1976; 1980; 1984; 1988; 1992; 1994; 1998; 2002; 2006; 2010; 2014; 2018; 2022; 2026

The Netherlands competed at the 2014 Winter Olympics in Sochi, Russia from 7 to 23 February 2014. The Dutch team was the largest Dutch delegation at a Winter Olympics, with 41 competitors that participated in bobsleigh, short track speed skating, snowboarding, and speed skating.

With a total of 24 medals, it turned out to be the most successful Winter Games ever for the Dutch team. The Dutch team won 23 medals in speed skating and one medal in short track speed skating. Olympic speed skating records were set on the men's 5,000 metres by Sven Kramer, the men's 10,000 metres by Jorrit Bergsma, the men's team pursuit by Jan Blokhuijsen, Sven Kramer and Koen Verweij, the women's 1,500 metres by Jorien ter Mors and the women's team pursuit by Marrit Leenstra, Jorien ter Mors and Ireen Wüst. By sweeping the podium in speed skating at the men's 500 m, 5,000 metres and 10,000 metres, and the women's 1,500 m, the Netherlands became the first country in Winter Olympics history to achieve four podium sweeps at one edition of the Games.

King Willem-Alexander, Queen Máxima, Prime Minister Mark Rutte, and Minister of Health, Welfare, and Sport Edith Schippers attended the Olympics. The Holland Heineken House was the meeting place for supporters and athletes during the Olympics.

== Medalists ==
The Dutch team won 24 medals of which 23 were in (long track) speed skating and one in short track speed skating.

The speed skaters swept the podiums in the men's 500 metres, men's 5,000 metres, men's 10,000 metres, and the women's 1,500 metres. The Netherlands is the first country to achieve four podium sweeps at one Winter Olympics edition (beating the previous record of two which was achieved by Norway in 1924, 1928 and 1932, Soviet Union in 1964, East Germany in 1972 and 1984 and Germany in 1998).

In the women's 1,500 metres speed skating, Dutch athletes placed 1st, 2nd, 3rd and 4th; the first such result in Olympic speed skating history by athletes from a single nation.

Medal	Name	Sport	Event	Date
Gold	Sven Kramer	Speed skating	Men's 5000 metres	8 February
Gold	Ireen Wüst	Speed skating	Women's 3000 metres	9 February
Gold	Michel Mulder	Speed skating	Men's 500 metres	10 February
Gold	Stefan Groothuis	Speed skating	Men's 1000 metres	12 February
Gold	Jorien ter Mors	Speed skating	Women's 1500 metres	16 February
Gold	Jorrit Bergsma	Speed skating	Men's 10,000 metres	18 February
Gold	Jan Blokhuijsen; Sven Kramer; Koen Verweij	Speed skating	Men's team pursuit	22 February
Gold	Lotte van Beek; Marrit Leenstra; Jorien ter Mors; Ireen Wüst	Speed skating	Women's team pursuit	22 February
Silver	Jan Blokhuijsen	Speed skating	Men's 5000 metres	8 February
Silver	Jan Smeekens	Speed skating	Men's 500 metres	10 February
Silver	Ireen Wüst	Speed skating	Women's 1000 metres	13 February
Silver	Koen Verweij	Speed skating	Men's 1500 metres	15 February
Silver	Ireen Wüst	Speed skating	Women's 1500 metres	16 February
Silver	Sven Kramer	Speed skating	Men's 10,000 metres	18 February
Silver	Ireen Wüst	Speed skating	Women's 5000 metres	19 February
Bronze	Jorrit Bergsma	Speed skating	Men's 5000 metres	8 February
Bronze	Ronald Mulder	Speed skating	Men's 500 metres	10 February
Bronze	Margot Boer	Speed skating	Women's 500 metres	11 February
Bronze	Michel Mulder	Speed skating	Men's 1000 metres	12 February
Bronze	Margot Boer	Speed skating	Women's 1000 metres	13 February
Bronze	Sjinkie Knegt	Short track speed skating	Men's 1000 metres	15 February
Bronze	Lotte van Beek	Speed skating	Women's 1500 metres	16 February
Bronze	Bob de Jong	Speed skating	Men's 10,000 metres	18 February
Bronze	Carien Kleibeuker	Speed skating	Women's 5000 metres	19 February

Medals by sport
Sport	1st place, gold medalist(s)	2nd place, silver medalist(s)	3rd place, bronze medalist(s)	Total
Speed skating	8	7	8	23
Short track speed skating	0	0	1	1
Total	8	7	9	24

Medals by date
Day	Date	1st place, gold medalist(s)	2nd place, silver medalist(s)	3rd place, bronze medalist(s)	Total
Day 1	8 February	1	1	1	3
Day 2	9 February	1	0	0	1
Day 3	10 February	1	1	1	3
Day 4	11 February	0	0	1	1
Day 5	12 February	1	0	1	2
Day 6	13 February	0	1	1	2
Day 7	14 February	0	0	0	0
Day 8	15 February	0	1	1	2
Day 9	16 February	1	1	1	3
Day 10	17 February	0	0	0	0
Day 11	18 February	1	1	1	3
Day 12	19 February	0	1	1	2
Day 13	20 February	0	0	0	0
Day 14	21 February	0	0	0	0
Day 15	22 February	2	0	0	2
Day 16	23 February	0	0	0	0
Total		8	7	9	24

== Team ==
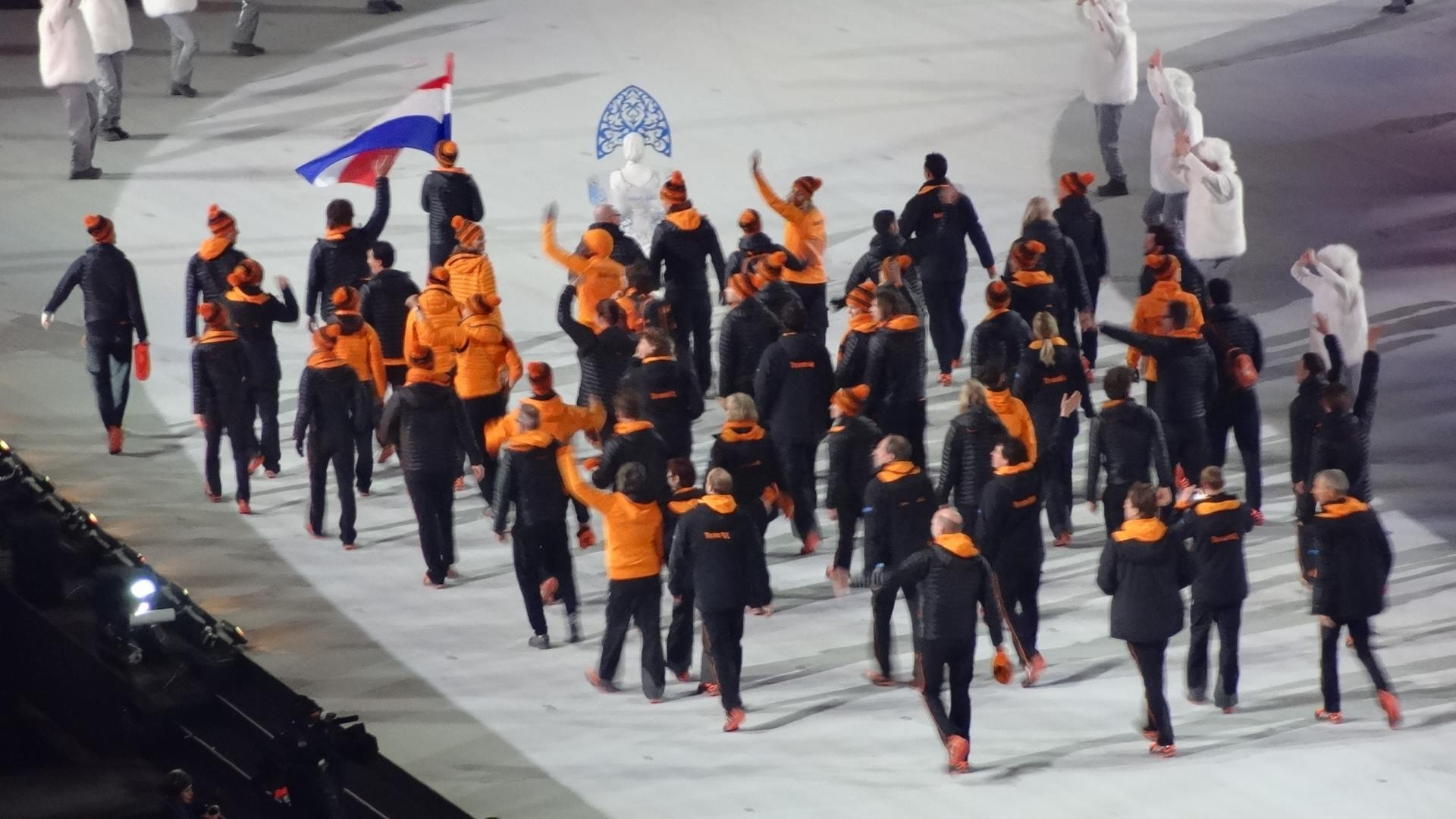
Dutch team entering the stadium during the opening ceremony

The Dutch team consisted of 41 competitors that participated in bobsleigh (6), short track speed skating (10), snowboarding (6), and speed skating (20). It was the largest Dutch delegation ever at the Winter Olympics. It was also the first time that the Netherlands had an athlete competing in two different sports: Jorien ter Mors competed in both short track speed skating and speed skating. Jorien ter Mors was the Dutch flag bearer at the opening ceremony and Bob de Jong was the flag bearer at the closing ceremony. Maurits Hendriks was the chef de mission for the Dutch team.

== Sports ==
=== Bobsleigh ===
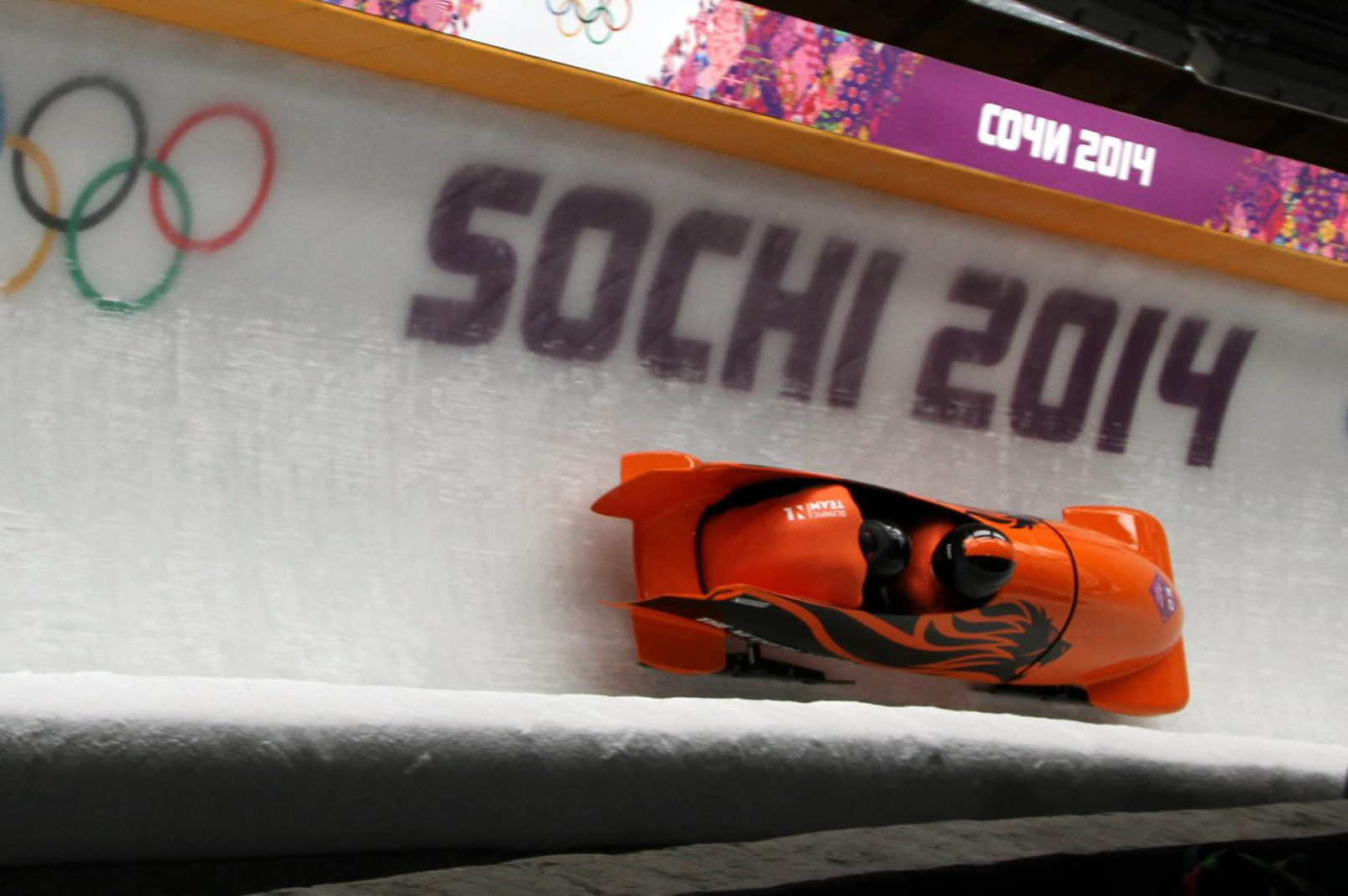
Pilot Edwin van Calker and crewman Bror van der Zijde in the Dutch two-man bobsleigh on 17 February 2014

The Dutch bobsledders (6 athletes) competed with one team in each bobsleigh event: two-man, four-man, and two-woman. Their best result was a fourth place of the two-woman team.

Athlete	Event	Run 1		Run 2		Run 3		Run 4		Total	
Athlete	Event	Time	Rank	Time	Rank	Time	Rank	Time	Rank	Time	Rank
Edwin van Calker* Bror van der Zijde	Two-man	57.54	=21	57.46	21	57.38	=18	56.95	15	3:49.33	19
Edwin van Calker* Sybren Jansma Arno Klaassen Bror van der Zijde	Four-man	55.55	13	55.57	15	55.82	12	55.75	12	3:42.69	11
Esmé Kamphuis* Judith Vis	Two-woman	57.94	5	58.10	6	58.20	6	58.03	2	3:52.27	4

Key: * denotes pilot of each sled, = denotes multiple teams share the same rank. Source:

=== Short track speed skating ===
The Dutch short track speed skaters (10 athletes) competed in all eight short track events.

The Netherlands qualified the maximum of five skaters of each gender for the Olympics during World Cup 3 & 4 in November 2013. Four men qualified for the 500 metres, but only three were allowed to start. The selection committee of the Dutch Speed Skating Federation (KNSB) decided that Daan Breeuwsma would not compete in the 500 metres.

Sjinkie Knegt won the bronze medal in the men's 1000 metres, which is the first ever Olympic medal in short track speed skating for the Netherlands.

Men

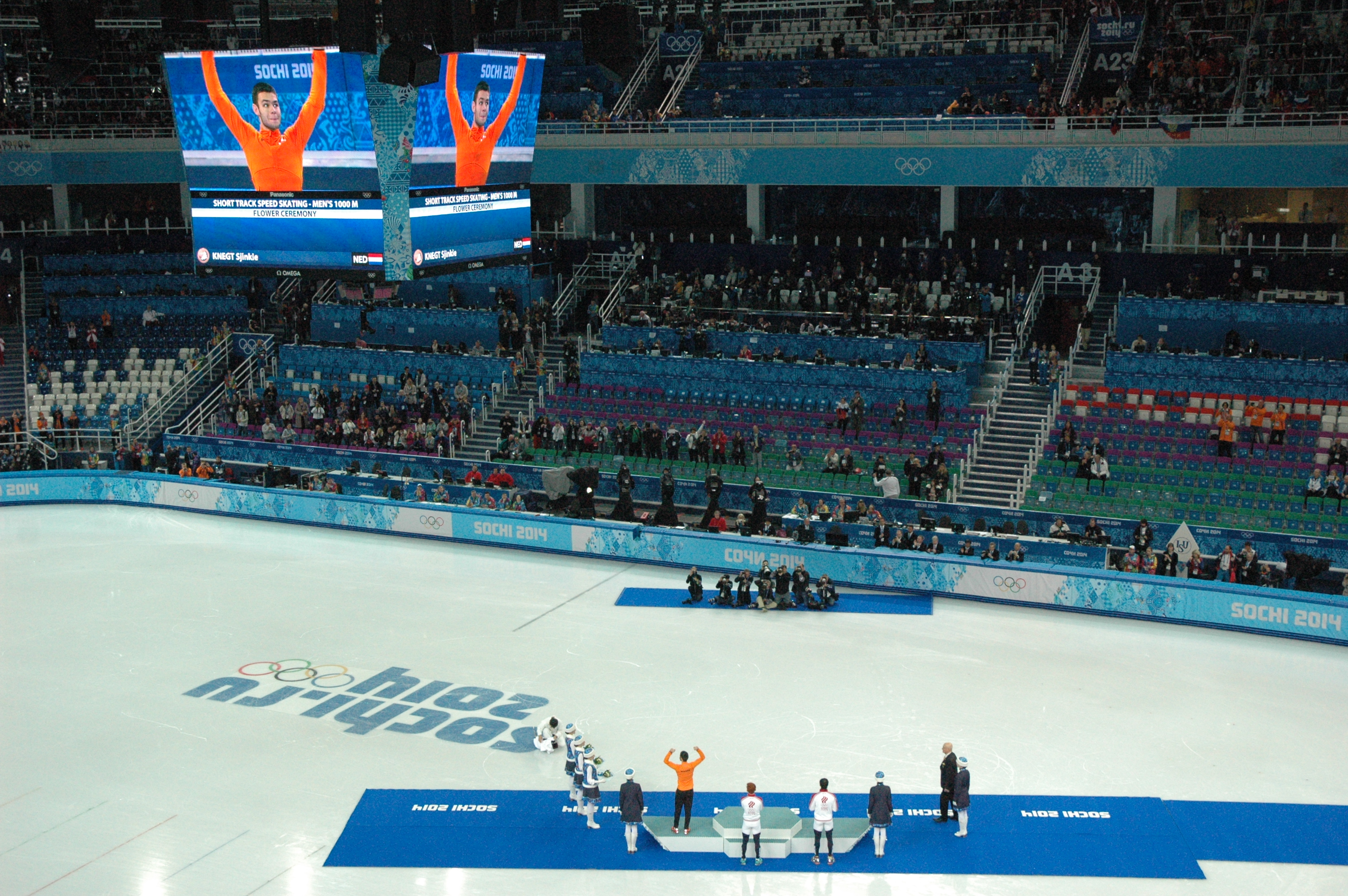
Sjinkie Knegt won bronze at the 1000 m.

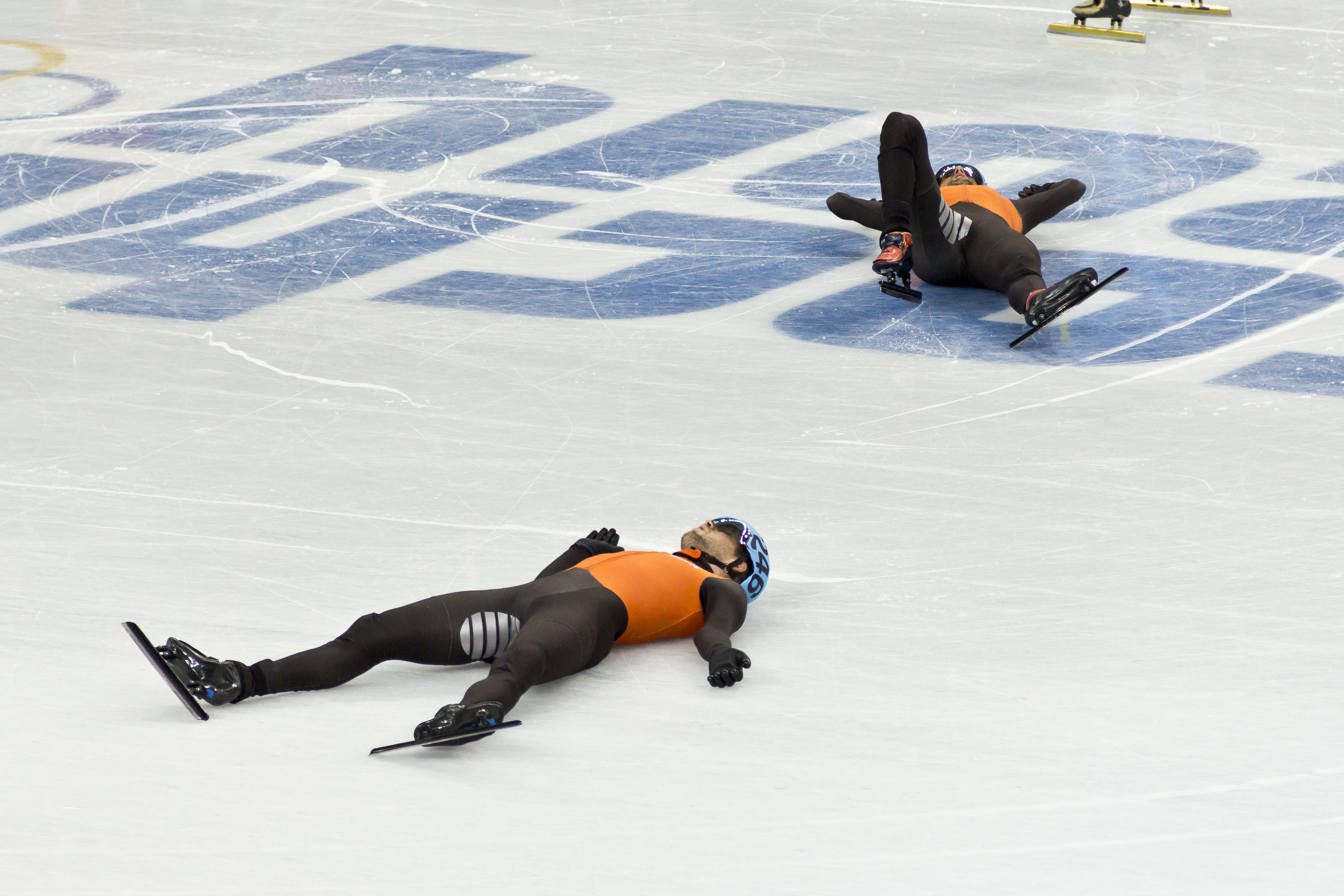
Dutch relay team after finishing fourth

Athlete	Event	Heat		Quarter-final		Semi-final		Final	
Athlete	Event	Time	Rank	Time	Rank	Time	Rank	Time	Rank
Niels Kerstholt	500 m	42.441	3	Did not advance					24
Niels Kerstholt	1000 m	1:25.695	3	Did not advance					19
Niels Kerstholt	1500 m	2:13.848	1 Q	—N/a		2:17.134	6	DNA	16
Freek van der Wart	500 m	41.190	2 Q	1:01.371	3	Did not advance			10
Freek van der Wart	1000 m	PEN		Did not advance					—
Sjinkie Knegt	500 m	41.235	1 Q	41.683	1 Q	41.290	3 FB	42.608	8
Sjinkie Knegt	1000 m	1:26.091	2 Q	1:25.695	2 Q	1:27.258	3 AA	1:25.611	3rd place, bronze medalist(s)
Sjinkie Knegt	1500 m	2:14.249	3 Q	—N/a		2:14.677	3 FB	2:39.581	12
Daan Breeuwsma Niels Kerstholt Sjinkie Knegt Freek van der Wart	5000 m relay	—N/a				6:45.385	1 FA	6:49.149	4

- Christiaan Bokkerink was selected as part of the relay squad but did not compete during the event.

Key: AA = Advanced to medal round due to being impeded by another skater; DNA = Did not advance; FA = Qualify to medal round; FB = Qualify to consolation round; PEN = Penalty; Q = Qualified to next round. Source:

Women

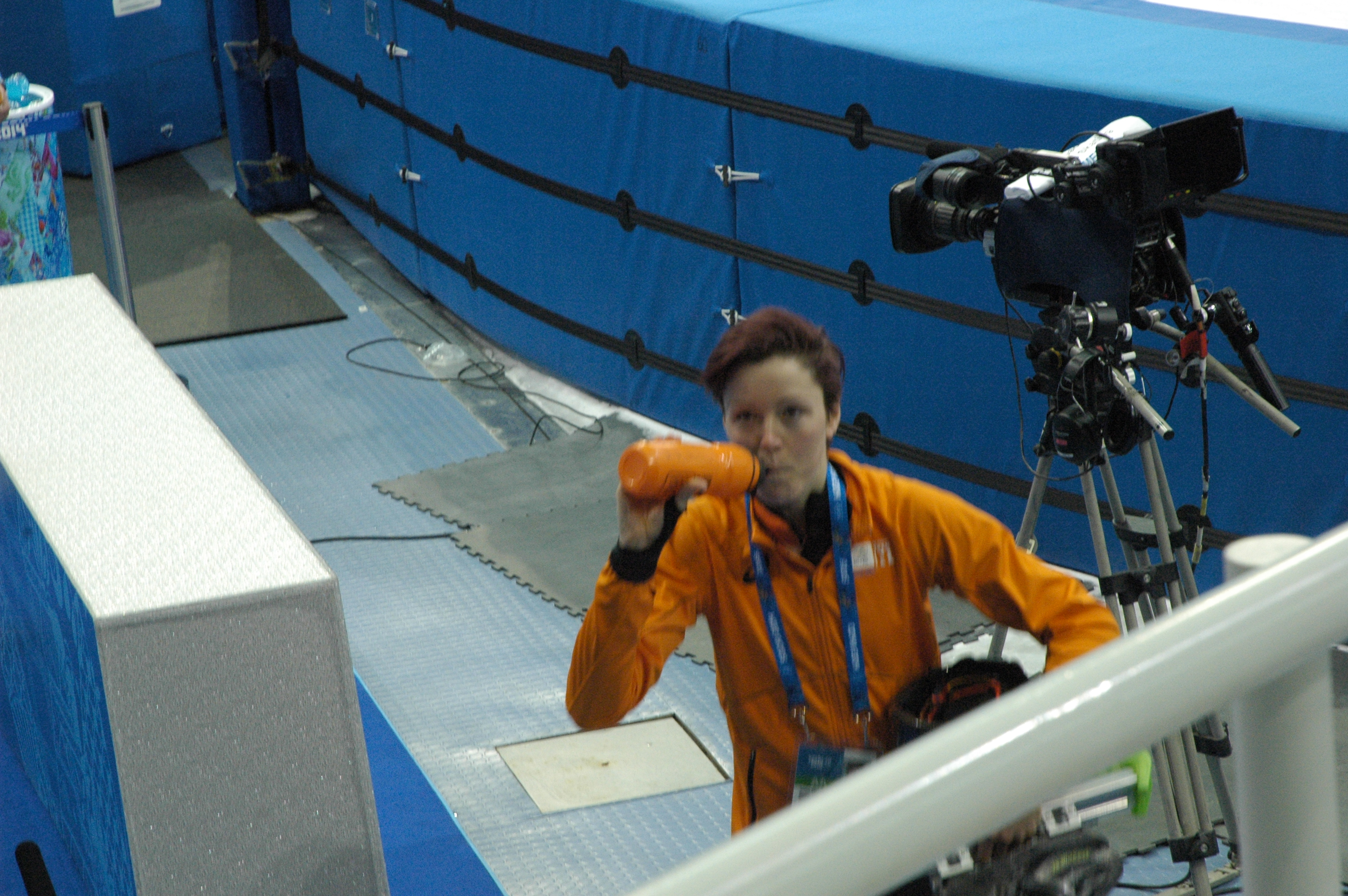
Jorien ter Mors

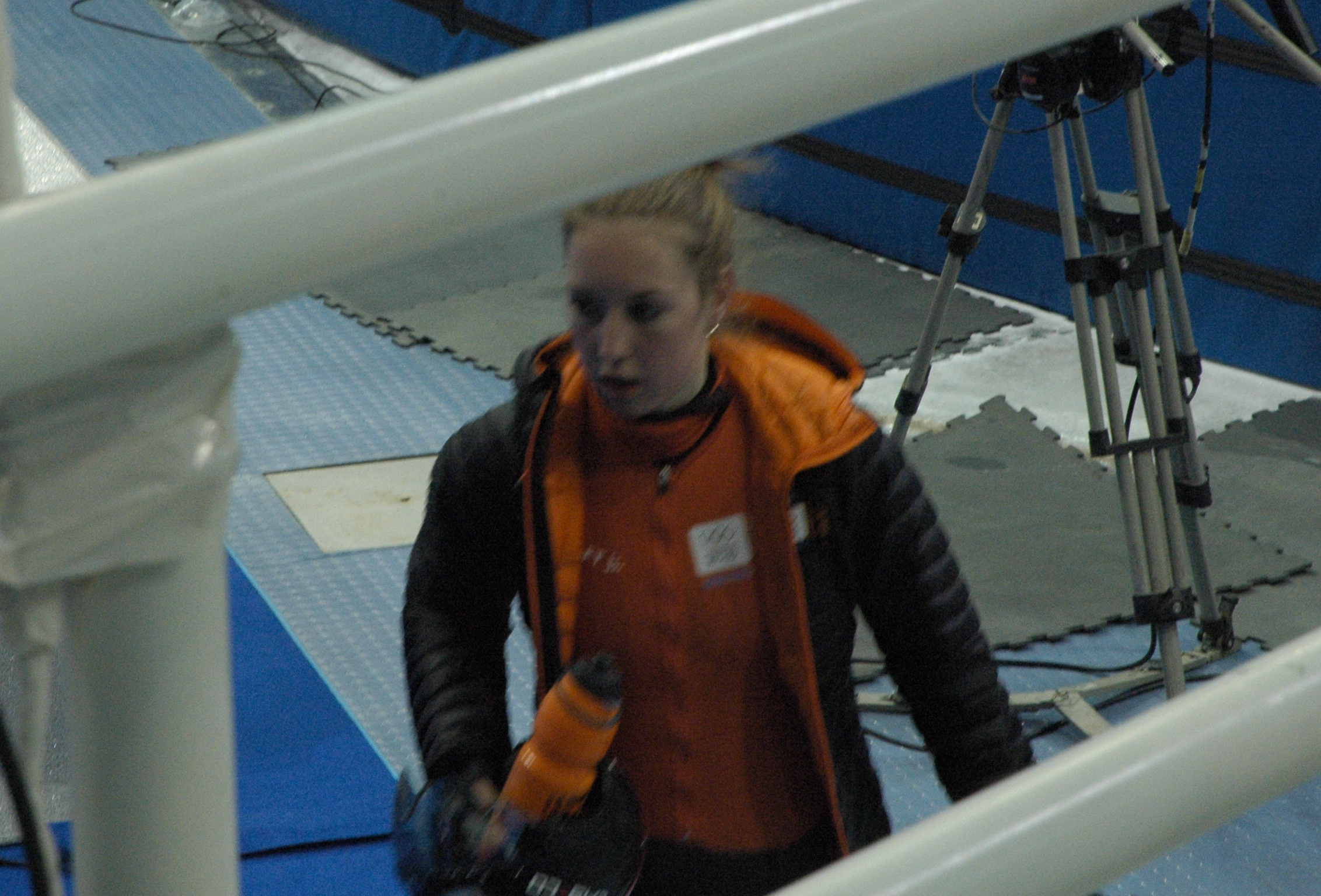
Lara van Ruijven

Athlete	Event	Heat		Quarter-final		Semi-final		Final	
Athlete	Event	Time	Rank	Time	Rank	Time	Rank	Time	Rank
Jorien ter Mors	500 m	44.262	1 Q	43.572	2 Q	44.242	4 FB	44.331	6
Jorien ter Mors	1000 m	1:46.661	3 A	1:29.119	2 Q	1:30.481	3 FB	1:36.835	5
Jorien ter Mors	1500 m	2:21.626	1 Q	—N/a		2:19.382	2 FA	2:19.656	4
Yara van Kerkhof	500 m	44.044	2 Q	43.888	3	Did not advance			11
Yara van Kerkhof	1000 m	1:29.980	3	Did not advance					18
Yara van Kerkhof	1500 m	2:26.809	3 Q	—N/a		2:20.291	5	DNA	15
Lara van Ruijven	500 m	44.023	3	Did not advance					17
Jorien ter Mors Sanne van Kerkhof Yara van Kerkhof Lara van Ruijven	3000 m relay	—N/a				PEN		DNA	—

- Rianne de Vries was selected as part of the relay squad but did not compete during the event.

Key: A = Advanced to next round due to being impeded by another skater; DNA = Did not advance; FA = Qualify to medal round; FB = Qualify to consolation round; PEN = Penalty; Q = Qualified to next round. Source:

=== Snowboarding ===
The Dutch snowboarders (6 athletes) competed in five of ten snowboarding events: men's halfpipe (2), women's slopestyle (1), women's parallel giant slalom (2), women's parallel slalom (2), and women's snowboard cross (1). None of the competitors advanced to the finals of their disciplines.

Freestyle

Athlete	Event	Qualification				Semi-final				Final			
Athlete	Event	Run 1	Run 2	Best	Rank	Run 1	Run 2	Best	Rank	Run 1	Run 2	Best	Rank
Dimi de Jong	Men's halfpipe	25.25	64.25	64.25	12	Did not advance							24
Dolf van der Wal	Men's halfpipe	25.50	62.50	62.50	14	Did not advance							26
Cheryl Maas	Women's slopestyle	18.00	31.25	31.25	9 QS	30.75	14.75	30.75	12	Did not advance			20

Key: QS = Qualify to semifinal. Source:

Parallel

Athlete	Event	Qualification		Round of 16	Quarter-final	Semi-final	Final	
Athlete	Event	Time	Rank	Opposition Time	Opposition Time	Opposition Time	Opposition Time	Rank
Michelle Dekker	Women's giant slalom	1:53.74	22	Did not advance				22
Michelle Dekker	Women's slalom	1:05.66	19	Did not advance				19
Nicolien Sauerbreij	Women's giant slalom	1:47.22	4 Q	Meschik (AUT); L +0.05	Did not advance			10
Nicolien Sauerbreij	Women's slalom	1:05.69	20	Did not advance				20

Key: L = Lost, Q = Qualify to next round. Source:

Snowboard cross

Athlete	Event	Seeding				Quarter-final	Semi-final	Final	
Athlete	Event	Run 1	Run 2	Best	Rank	Position	Position	Position	Rank
Bell Berghuis	Women's snowboard cross	1:28.19	1:28.70	1:28.19	22	5	Did not advance		20

=== Speed skating ===
The Netherlands qualified the maximum of ten speed skaters of each gender. Individual riders were selected from the results of the Dutch Olympic Qualification Tournament, held between 27 and 30 December 2013 in Thialf, Heerenveen.

The Dutch speed skaters competed in all twelve long track events. The Netherlands dominated in speed skating, winning eight out of the 12 gold medals and a total of 23 out of 36 medals (of which any team, of course, could win a maximum of 32), with medals in all events. There were four Dutch podium sweeps at the men's 5000 m, men's 500 m, women's 1500 m and men's 10000 m. The women's 1,500 metres resulted in the Dutch women placing 1st, 2nd, 3rd, and 4th; the first such result by a single nation since East Germany dominated the men's singles luge competition at the 1972 Winter Olympics.

Margot Boer, by winning the bronze medal in the women's 500 metres, won the first ever Dutch Olympic medal in that event, while Michel Mulder was the first Dutch man to win gold at the 500 metres.

Men

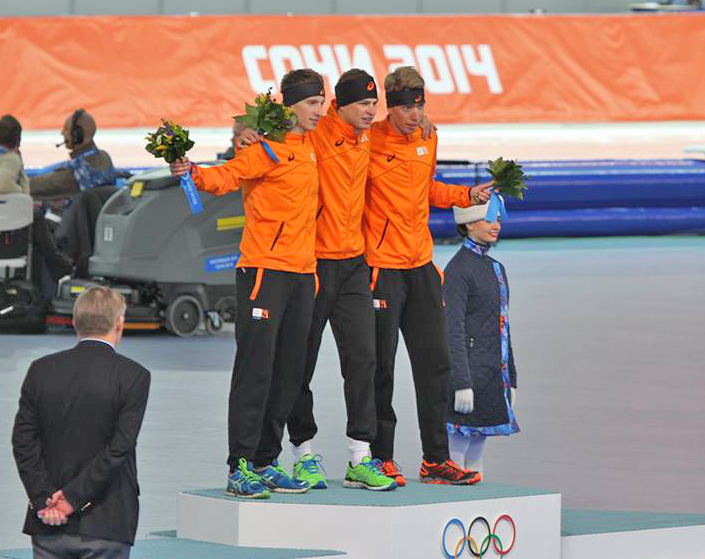
Dutch podium at the men's 5000 metres. 1) Sven Kramer 2) Jan Blokhuijsen 3) Jorrit Bergsma

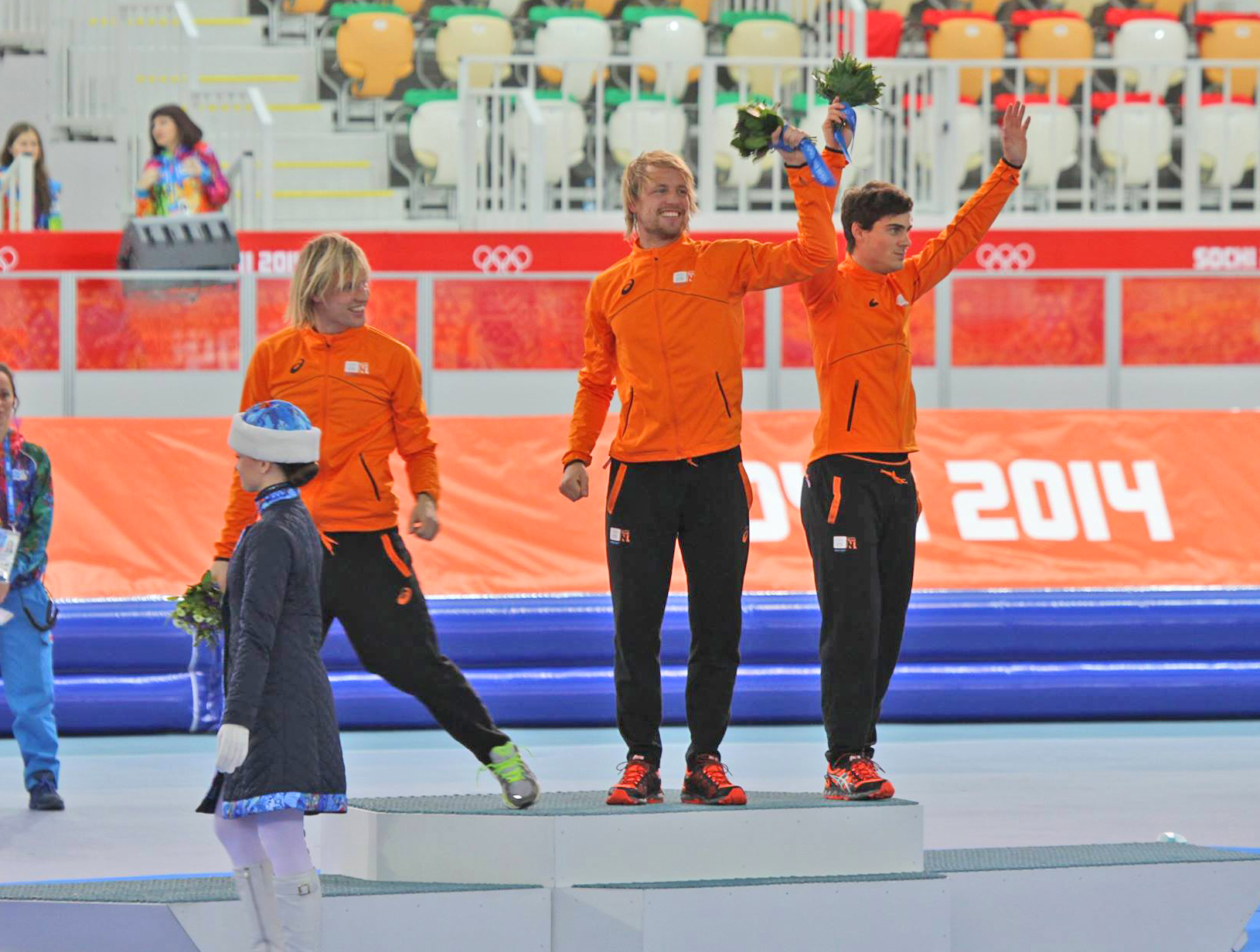
Another Dutch podium at the men's 500 metres. 1) Michel Mulder 2) Jan Smeekens 3) Ronald Mulder

Athlete	Event	Race 1		Race 2		Final	
Athlete	Event	Time	Rank	Time	Rank	Time	Rank
Jorrit Bergsma	5000 m	—N/a				6:16.66	3rd place, bronze medalist(s)
Jorrit Bergsma	10000 m	—N/a				OR 12:44.45	1st place, gold medalist(s)
Jan Blokhuijsen	1500 m	—N/a				1:46.50	13
Jan Blokhuijsen	5000 m	—N/a				6:15.71	2nd place, silver medalist(s)
Stefan Groothuis	500 m	35.42	24	56.81	39	92.24	38
Stefan Groothuis	1000 m	—N/a				1:08.39	1st place, gold medalist(s)
Stefan Groothuis	1500 m	—N/a				1:46.08	12
Bob de Jong	10000 m	—N/a				13:07.19	3rd place, bronze medalist(s)
Sven Kramer	5000 m	—N/a				OR 6:10.76	1st place, gold medalist(s)
Sven Kramer	10000 m	—N/a				12:49.02	2nd place, silver medalist(s)
Michel Mulder	500 m	34.63	2	34.67	2	69.312	1st place, gold medalist(s)
Michel Mulder	1000 m	—N/a				1:08.74	3rd place, bronze medalist(s)
Ronald Mulder	500 m	34.969	6	34.49	1	69.46	3rd place, bronze medalist(s)
Jan Smeekens	500 m	34.59	1	34.72	3	69.324	2nd place, silver medalist(s)
Mark Tuitert	1000 m	—N/a				1:09.29	10
Mark Tuitert	1500 m	—N/a				1:45.42	5
Koen Verweij	1000 m	—N/a				1:09.09	6
Koen Verweij	1500 m	—N/a				1:45.009	2nd place, silver medalist(s)

Key: OR = Olympic record. Source:

Women

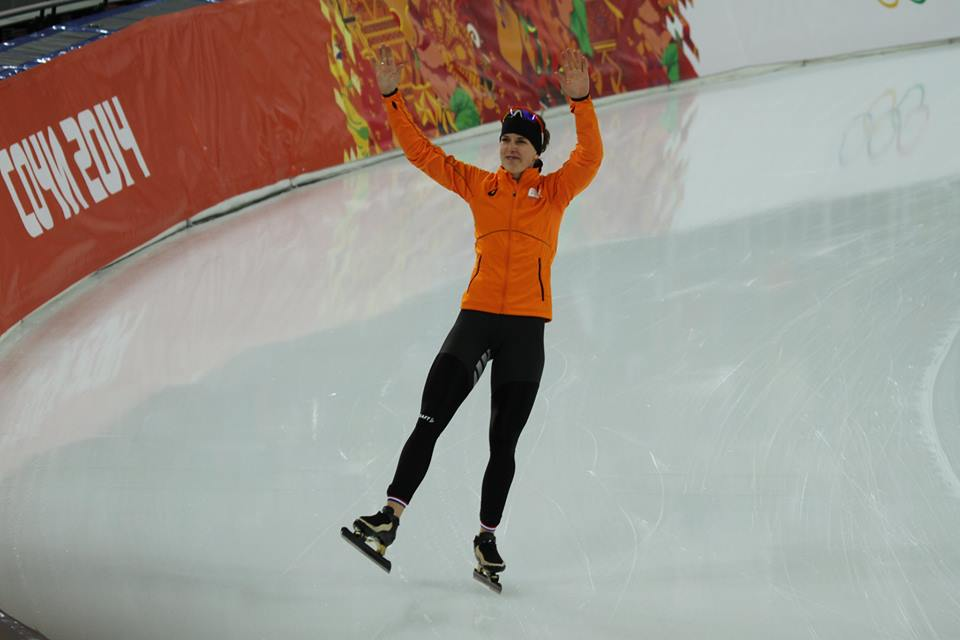
Ireen Wüst after winning the women's 3000 metres.

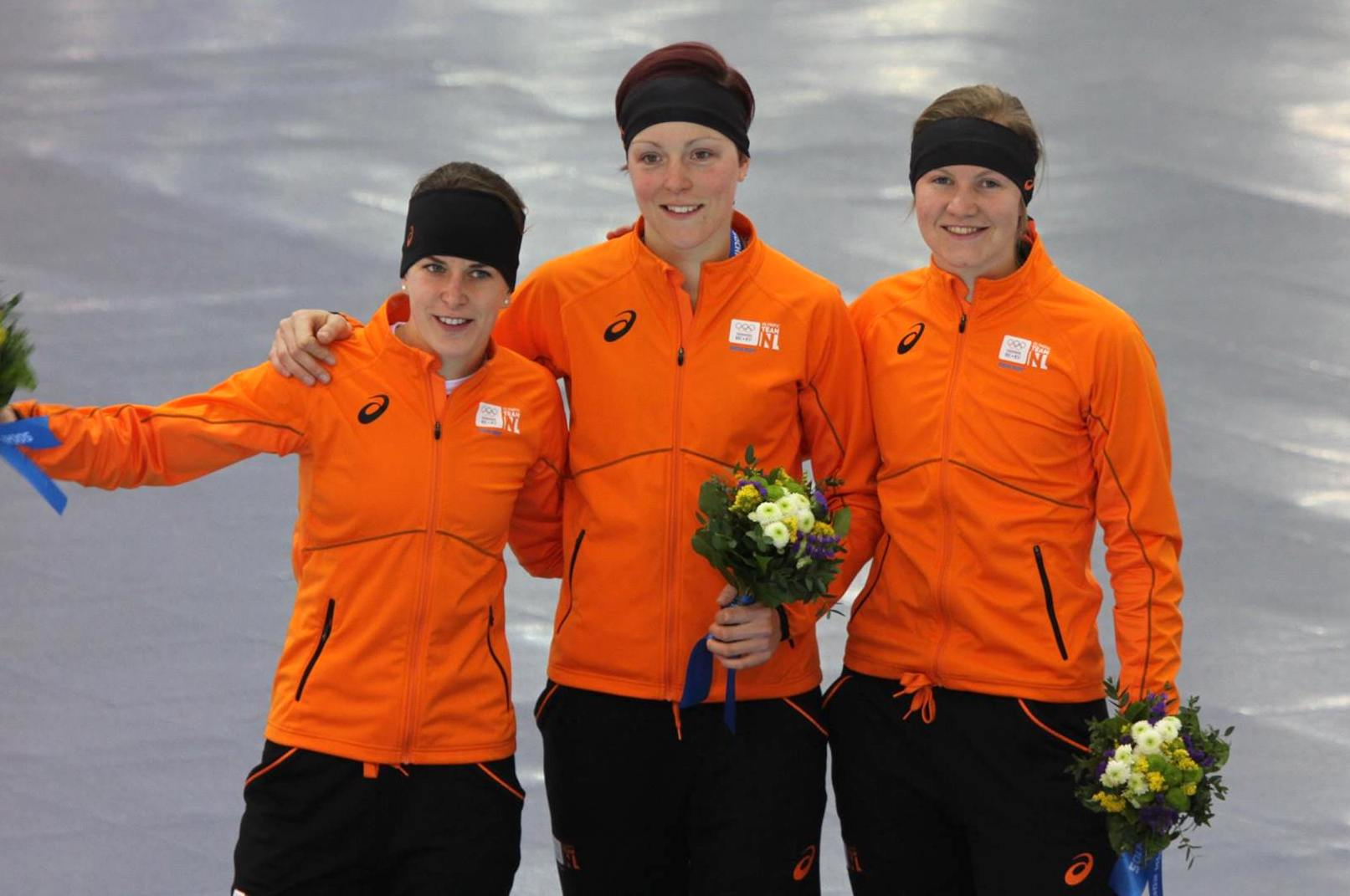
Dutch podium at the women's 1500 metres. 1) Jorien ter Mors 2) Ireen Wust 3) Lotte van Beek

Athlete	Event	Race 1		Race 2		Final	
Athlete	Event	Time	Rank	Time	Rank	Time	Rank
Lotte van Beek	500 m	38.67	15	38.73	17	77.40	16
Lotte van Beek	1000 m	—N/a				1:15.10	5
Lotte van Beek	1500 m	—N/a				1:54.54	3rd place, bronze medalist(s)
Margot Boer	500 m	37.77	5	37.71	3	75.48	3rd place, bronze medalist(s)
Margot Boer	1000 m	—N/a				1:14.90	3rd place, bronze medalist(s)
Antoinette de Jong	3000 m	—N/a				4:06.77	7
Carien Kleibeuker	5000 m	—N/a				6:55.66	3rd place, bronze medalist(s)
Marrit Leenstra	500 m	39.03	21	38.7	16	77.74	19
Marrit Leenstra	1000 m	—N/a				1:15.15	6
Marrit Leenstra	1500 m	—N/a				1:56.40	4
Jorien ter Mors	1500 m	—N/a				OR 1:53.51	1st place, gold medalist(s)
Yvonne Nauta	5000 m	—N/a				7:01.76	6
Laurine van Riessen	500 m	38.645	14	38.35	9	76.99	11
Annouk van der Weijden	3000 m	—N/a				4:05.75	5
Ireen Wüst	1000 m	—N/a				1:14.69	2nd place, silver medalist(s)
Ireen Wüst	1500 m	—N/a				1:54.09	2nd place, silver medalist(s)
Ireen Wüst	3000 m	—N/a				4:00.34	1st place, gold medalist(s)
Ireen Wüst	5000 m	—N/a				6:54.28	2nd place, silver medalist(s)

Key: OR = Olympic record. Source:

Team pursuit

Athlete	Event	Quarter-final	Semi-final	Final	
Athlete	Event	Opposition Time	Opposition Time	Opposition Time	Rank
Sven Kramer Koen Verweij Jan Blokhuijsen	Men's team pursuit	France; W 3:44.48	Poland; W 3:40.79	South Korea; W 3:37.71 OR	1st place, gold medalist(s)
Ireen Wüst Lotte van Beek Marrit Leenstra Jorien ter Mors	Women's team pursuit	United States; W 2:58.61 OR	Japan; W 2:58.43 OR	Poland; W 2:58.05 OR	1st place, gold medalist(s)

- Jorrit Bergsma was selected as part of the men's team pursuit squad but did not compete during the event.

Key: OR = Olympic record, W = Won. Source:

== Supporters ==
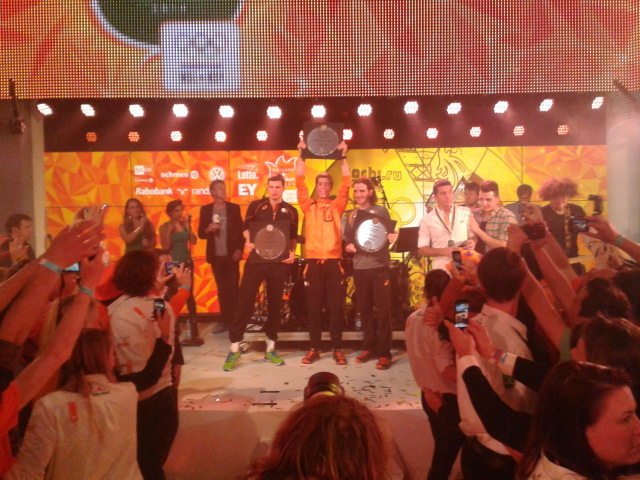
The medalists of the men's 10000 metres in speed skating celebrated with fans in the Holland Heineken House

=== Dignitaries ===
Dutch Prime Minister Mark Rutte and King Willem-Alexander attended the Olympics, despite the recent troubled Dutch relationship with Russia. The pair was accompanied by the King's wife Queen Máxima and Dutch Minister of Health, Welfare and Sport Edith Schippers, with the King's status as an Honorary member of the IOC adding to the significance of his visit. The visit was controversial due to the Russian anti-gay laws. On the second day of the Games, King Willem-Alexander awarded the medals to the three Dutch medalists of the men's 5000 metres speed skating during the victory ceremony at medal plaza.

=== National house ===
During the Games, the Netherlands had a national house; the 12th edition of the Holland Heineken House. Organized by NOC*NSF and Heineken, the Dutch national house was a meeting place for Dutch supporters, athletes and other followers. The Dutch national house was located 5 km south of the Olympic Park at the Azimut Hotel Resort. King Willem-Alexander and Queen Máxima, as well as Russian president Vladimir Putin visited the Dutch national house during the Games.
