= Shoko Fujimura =

Japanese speed skater (born 1987)

Shoko Fujimura (藤村 祥子, Fujimura Shōko, born 26 April 1987) is a Japanese speed skater. She was born in Hokkaido. She competed at the 2014 Winter Olympics in Sochi, where she placed 15th in the 3000 meters and 10th in the 5000 meters.
