= Shiho Ishizawa =

Japanese speed skater (born 1986)

Medal record

Women's speed skating

Representing Japan

Asian Games
Bronze medal – third place	2011 Astana–Almaty	Team pursuit

Shiho Ishizawa (石澤 志穂, Ishizawa Shiho, born 23 October 1986) is a Japanese speed skater. She was born in Hokkaido. She won a bronze medal in the women's team pursuit at the 2011 Asian Winter Games. She competed at the 2010 and 2014 Winter Olympics, placing ninth in the 3000 meters in Sochi.
