= Adler Arena Skating Center =

Skating oval in Sochi, Russia

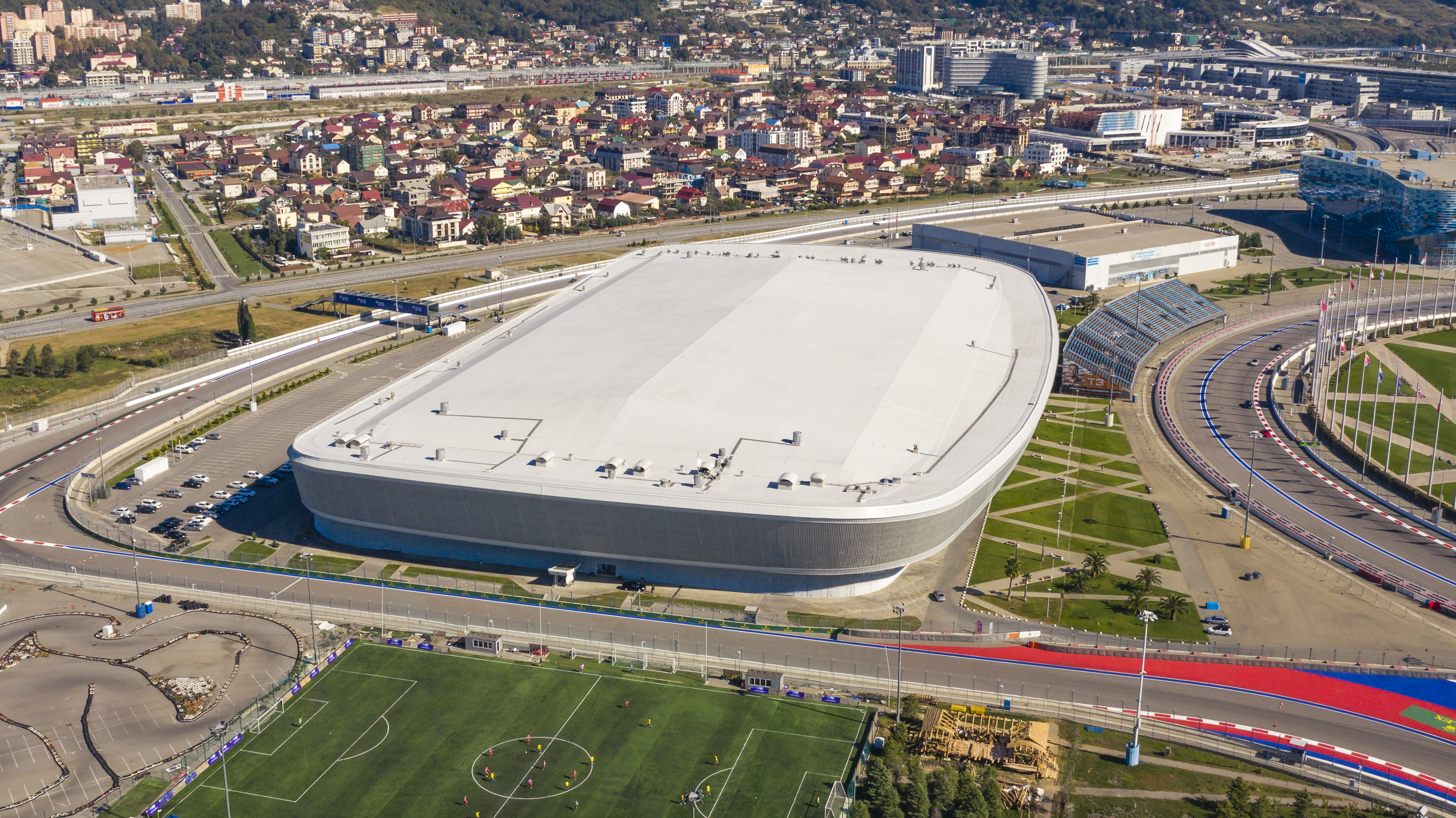
- The Adler Arena outside. Next to it is the Sochi Autodrom.
- Interactive map of Adler Arena Skating Center
- Location: Sochi, Russia
- Coordinates: 43°24′31″N 39°57′10″E
- Capacity: 8,000 Olympic Mode

Construction
- Opened: 2012
- Cost: $32,8 million

Tenants
- 2013 Russian Speed Skating Championships; 2013 World Single Distance Speed Skating Championships; 2014 Winter Olympics (speed skating)

The Adler Arena Trade And Exhibition Center (Адлер-Арена) is an 8,000-seat speed skating oval in the Olympic Park, Sochi, Russia. It opened in 2012 and looks like an iceberg or ice fault. The center hosted the speed skating events at the 2014 Winter Olympics. Original plans for after the Olympics were for the Adler Arena to be turned into an exhibition center.

It cost $32.8 million to build the venue, including the temporary works for the Olympics. Before the Olympics it hosted the 2013 Russian Speed Skating Championships in December 2012 and the 2013 World Single Distance Speed Skating Championships from 21 to 24 March 2013.

== Construction ==
A crystal face theme is supported by angular walls and triangular stained-glass windows. The gray and white color of the building enhances this impression. The walls along the sides of the skating rink are made transparent so that spectators can look outside. The skating center is designed to make the utmost use of local natural features.

== Track records ==
=== Men ===
| Distance | Skater | Time | Date | Event |
|---|---|---|---|---|
| 500 m | (Netherlands) Ronald Mulder | 34.49 | 10 February 2014 | Winter Olympics |
| 1000 m | (Netherlands) Stefan Groothuis | 1:08.39 | 12 February 2014 | Winter Olympics |
| 1500 m | (Poland) Zbigniew Bródka | 1:45.006 | 15 February 2014 | Winter Olympics |
| 3000 m | (Russia) Ivan Skobrev | 3:43.49 | 3 February 2014 | Test Competition |
| 5000 m | (Netherlands) Sven Kramer | 6:10.76 | 8 February 2014 | Winter Olympics |
| 10000 m | (Netherlands) Jorrit Bergsma | 12:44.45 | 18 February 2014 | Winter Olympics |
| Team pursuit (8 laps) | Netherlands; Jan Blokhuijsen; Sven Kramer; Koen Verweij | 3:37.71 | 22 February 2014 | Winter Olympics |
| Combination | Skater | Points | Date | Match |
| 2 x 500 m | (Netherlands) Michel Mulder | 69.312 | 10 February 2014 | Winter Olympics |
| Sprint | (Russia) Dmitry Lobkov | 143.840 | 28–29 December 2012 | National Championship |
| All-Round | (Russia) Ivan Skobrev | 152.747 | 26–27 December 2012 | National Championship |

=== Women ===
| Distance | Skater | Time | Date | Event |
|---|---|---|---|---|
| 500 m | (South Korea) Lee Sang-hwa | 37.28 | 11 February 2014 | Winter Olympics |
| 1000 m | (China) Zhang Hong | 1:14.02 | 13 February 2014 | Winter Olympics |
| 1500 m | (Netherlands) Jorien ter Mors | 1:53.51 | 16 February 2014 | Winter Olympics |
| 3000 m | (Netherlands) Ireen Wüst | 4:00.34 | 9 February 2014 | Winter Olympics |
| 5000 m | (Czech Republic) Martina Sáblíková | 6:51.54 | 19 February 2014 | Winter Olympics |
| Team pursuit (6 laps) | Netherlands; Marrit Leenstra; Jorien ter Mors; Ireen Wüst | 2:58.05 | 22 February 2014 | Winter Olympics |
| Combination | Skater | Points | Date | Match |
| 2 x 500 m | (South Korea) Lee Sang-hwa | 74.700 | 11 February 2014 | Winter Olympics |
| Sprint | (Russia) Olga Fatkulina | 155.255 | 28–29 December 2012 | National Championship |
| All-Round | (Russia) Yekaterina Shikhova | 166.461 | 26–27 December 2012 | National Championship |

Source: www.speedskatingnews.info

== Other uses ==
The skating centre hosted the 2014 World Robot Olympiad. Russia hosted their 2015 Fed Cup World Group semifinals tie at the Adler Arena.

== See also ==
- List of indoor arenas in Russia
