= Russia at the 2014 Winter Olympics =

- IOC code: RUS
- NOC: Russian Olympic Committee
- Website: www.roc.ru (in Russian)

in Sochi
- Competitors: 232 in 15 sports
- Flag bearers: Alexandr Zubkov (opening); Maxim Trankov (closing)
- Medals Ranked 2nd: Gold 10 Silver 10 Bronze 9 Total 29

Winter Olympics appearances (overview)
- 1994; 1998; 2002; 2006; 2010; 2014; 2018–2026

Other related appearances
- Soviet Union (1956–1988); Unified Team (1992); Olympic Athletes from Russia (2018); ROC (2022); Individual Neutral Athletes (2026)

Russia hosted the 2014 Winter Olympics in Sochi, Krasnodar Krai from 7 to 23 February 2014 and was the top medal recipient at those Games. As hosts, Russia participated in all 15 sports, with a team consisting of 232 athletes. It is Russia's largest Winter Olympics team to date.

In preparation for the Games the Russian Olympic Committee naturalized a South Korean-born short-track speed-skater Ahn Hyun-soo and an American-born snowboarder Vic Wild. They won a total of 5 gold and 1 bronze medals in Sochi.

Russia's medal count in 2014, 33 (before doping disqualifications), was its highest ever in the Winter Olympics, improving on the 1994 Games, when the Russian team earned 23 medals overall, and also beating the Soviet Union's best-ever medal count at the Winter Olympics.

Bobsledder Aleksandr Zubkov was the flag bearer of the Russian team in the Parade of Nations during the opening ceremony.

Following the Games, it was discovered that Russia's performance has been aided by a wider state-sponsored doping program. On December 9, 2016, Canadian lawyer Richard McLaren published the second part of his independent report. The investigation found that from 2011 to 2015, more than 1,000 Russian competitors in various sports (including summer, winter, and Paralympic sports) benefited from the cover-up.

At the end of 2017, IOC disqualified 43 Russian athletes and stripped Russia from 13 Sochi medals, but Court of Arbitration for Sport nullified 28 out of 43 disqualifications citing insufficient evidence and returned 9 out of 13 medals. In particular, on November 1, 2017, cross-country skiers Evgeniy Belov and gold and silver medalist Alexander Legkov became the first athletes to be disqualified for doping violations after an investigation was completed. Four more were disqualified on November 9, 2017, when Maksim Vylegzhanin, Evgenia Shapovalova, Alexei Petukhov, and Julia Ivanova were sanctioned. The total was brought to ten when gold medalist Aleksandr Tretyakov and bronze medalist Elena Nikitina were banned along with Maria Orlova and Olga Potylitsina who were all skeleton racers. On November 24, 2017, the IOC imposed life bans on bobsledder Alexandr Zubkov and speed skater Olga Fatkulina who won a combined of 3 medals (2 gold, 1 silver). All their results were disqualified, meaning that Russia lost its first place in the medal standings. On November 27, 2017, IOC disqualified Olga Vilukhina, Yana Romanova, Sergey Chudinov, Alexey Negodaylo, and Dmitry Trunenkov, and stripped Vilyukhina and Romanova of their medals in biathlon. Three athletes who didn't win medals (Alexander Kasjanov, Ilvir Huzin, Aleksei Pushkarev) were sanctioned on November 29, 2017. Biathlete Olga Zaitseva, who won silver in a relay was disqualified on December 1, 2017. Two other athletes, Anastasia Dotsenko and Yuliya Chekalyova, were also banned. On December 12, 2017, six Russian ice hockey players were disqualified. On 18 December 2017 the IOC imposed a life ban on bobsledder Alexey Voyevoda. Eleven athletes were disqualified on December 22, 2017. Among them, silver medalists Albert Demchenko and Tatiana Ivanova who were stripped of their medals in luge. On 1 February 2018, nine medals were returned after a successful Russian appeal to the Court of Arbitration for Sport. On 24 September 2020, one more medal was returned after an appeal to the Court of Arbitration for Sport. On 15 February 2020, the International Biathlon Union announced that because of a doping violation, Evgeny Ustyugov and Russian men's 4 x 7.5km relay team had been disqualified from the 2014 Olympics. The International Olympic Committee results affirm the decision, but medals have not been reallocated yet.

== Medalists ==
Medals by sport
Sport	1st place, gold medalist(s)	2nd place, silver medalist(s)	3rd place, bronze medalist(s)	Total
Figure skating	3	1	1	5
Short track speed skating	3	1	1	5
Snowboarding	2	1	1	4
Cross-country skiing	1	3	1	5
Biathlon	0	1	1	2
Skeleton	1	0	1	2
Luge	0	2	0	2
Speed skating	0	1	2	3
Freestyle skiing	0	0	1	1
Total	10	10	9	29

Medals by date
Day	Date	1st place, gold medalist(s)	2nd place, silver medalist(s)	3rd place, bronze medalist(s)	Total
Day 1	8 February	0	0	0	0
Day 2	9 February	1	2	1	4
Day 3	10 February	0	0	2	2
Day 4	11 February	0	1	0	1
Day 5	12 February	1	1	0	2
Day 6	13 February	0	1	1	2
Day 7	14 February	0	0	1	1
Day 8	15 February	2	1	0	3
Day 9	16 February	0	1	0	1
Day 10	17 February	0	0	1	1
Day 11	18 February	0	1	0	1
Day 12	19 February	1	1	1	3
Day 13	20 February	1	0	0	1
Day 14	21 February	2	0	0	2
Day 15	22 February	1	0	1	2
Day 16	23 February	1	1	1	3
Total		10	10	9	29

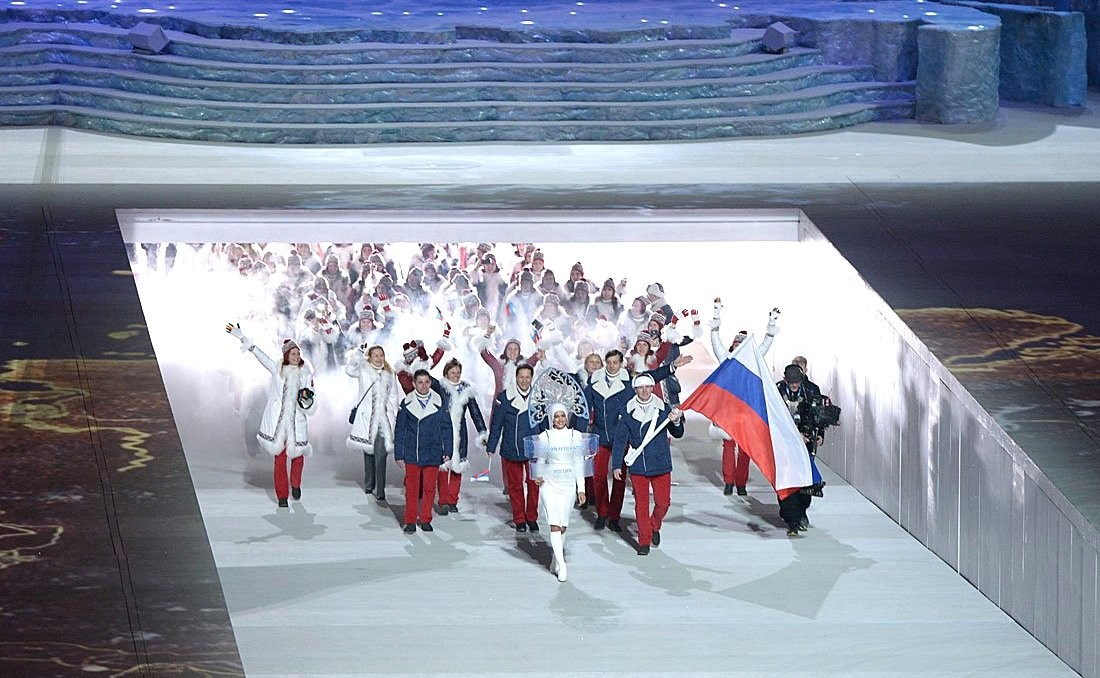
Russian team entering the stadium during the opening ceremony

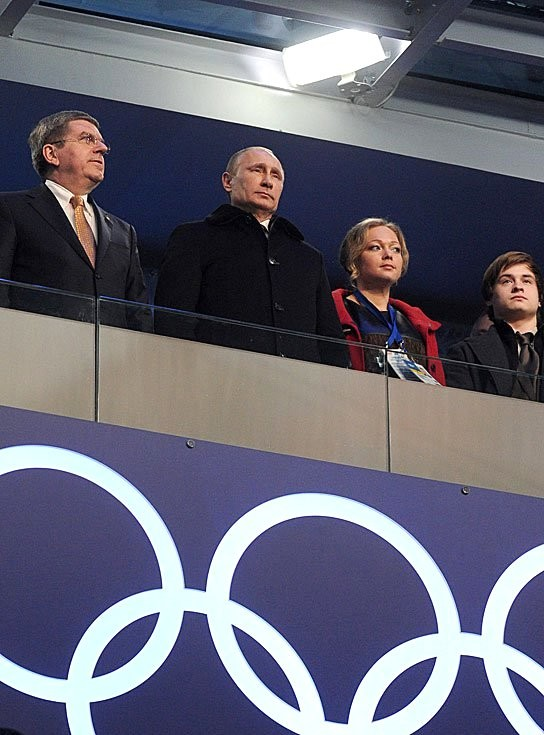
Thomas Bach, President Vladimir Putin and bobsledder Irina Skvortsova at the opening ceremony

Medal	Name	Sport	Event	Date
Gold	Evgeni Plushenko; Yulia Lipnitskaya; Tatiana Volosozhar / Maxim Trankov; Ksenia Stolbova / Fedor Klimov; Ekaterina Bobrova / Dmitri Soloviev; Elena Ilinykh / Nikita Katsalapov	Figure skating	Team event	9 February
Gold	Tatiana Volosozhar / Maxim Trankov	Figure skating	Pair skating	12 February
Gold	Viktor Ahn	Short track speed skating	Men's 1000 metres	15 February
Gold	Aleksandr Tretyakov	Skeleton	Men's singles	15 February
Gold	Vic Wild	Snowboarding	Men's parallel giant slalom	19 February
Gold	Adelina Sotnikova	Figure skating	Ladies' singles	20 February
Gold	Viktor Ahn	Short track speed skating	Men's 500 metres	21 February
Gold	Viktor Ahn; Semion Elistratov; Vladimir Grigorev; Ruslan Zakharov	Short track speed skating	Men's 5000 metre relay	21 February
Gold	Vic Wild	Snowboarding	Men's parallel slalom	22 February
Gold	Alexander Legkov	Cross-country skiing	Men's 50 km freestyle	23 February
Silver	Albert Demchenko	Luge	Men's singles	9 February
Silver	Olga Fatkulina	Speed skating	Women's 500 metres	11 February
Silver	Ksenia Stolbova / Fedor Klimov	Figure skating	Pair skating	12 February
Silver	Tatiana Ivanova; Albert Demchenko; Alexander Denisyev / Vladislav Antonov	Luge	Team relay	13 February
Silver	Vladimir Grigorev	Short track speed skating	Men's 1000 metres	15 February
Silver	Alexander Bessmertnykh; Alexander Legkov; Maxim Vylegzhanin; Dmitry Japarov	Cross-country skiing	Men's 4×10 km relay	16 February
Silver	Nikolay Olyunin	Snowboarding	Men's snowboard cross	18 February
Silver	Maxim Vylegzhanin; Nikita Kriukov	Cross-country skiing	Men's team sprint	19 February
Silver	Maxim Vylegzhanin	Cross-country skiing	Men's 50 km freestyle	23 February
Silver	Olga Vilukhina	Biathlon	Women's sprint	9 February
Bronze	Olga Graf	Speed skating	Women's 3000 metres	9 February
Bronze	Viktor Ahn	Short track speed skating	Men's 1500 metres	10 February
Bronze	Alexandr Smyshlyaev	Freestyle skiing	Men's moguls	10 February
Bronze	Evgeniy Garanichev	Biathlon	Men's individual	13 February
Bronze	Elena Nikitina	Skeleton	Women's singles	14 February
Bronze	Elena Ilinykh; Nikita Katsalapov	Figure skating	Ice dancing	17 February
Bronze	Alena Zavarzina	Snowboarding	Women's parallel giant slalom	19 February
Bronze	Olga Graf; Yekaterina Lobysheva; Yekaterina Shikhova; Yuliya Skokova	Speed skating	Women's team pursuit	22 February
Bronze	Ilia Chernousov	Cross-country skiing	Men's 50 km freestyle	23 February

== Alpine skiing ==
As a host nation, Russia has qualified a total quota of nine athletes in alpine skiing.

Men

Athlete	Event	Run 1		Run 2		Total	
Athlete	Event	Time	Rank	Time	Rank	Time	Rank
Aleksandr Glebov	Downhill	—N/a				2:08.96	23
Aleksandr Glebov	Super-G	—N/a				DNF	
Aleksandr Khoroshilov	Combined	1:56.03	24	1:02.43	33	2:58.46	30
Aleksandr Khoroshilov	Slalom	48.71	19	55.52	=10	1:44.23	14
Sergei Maitakov	Giant slalom	1:23.75	28	1:25.92	29	2:49.67	26
Sergei Maitakov	Slalom	DNF					
Vladislav Novikov	Giant slalom	1:25.68	37	1:26.97	37	2:52.65	35
Pavel Trikhichev	Super-G	—N/a				1:20.62	26
Pavel Trikhichev	Combined	1:56.65	31	56.64	28	2:53.29	24
Pavel Trikhichev	Giant slalom	DNF					
Pavel Trikhichev	Slalom	51.63	41	1:08.16	38	1:59.79	33
Stepan Zuev	Super-G	—N/a				1:21.54	31
Stepan Zuev	Giant slalom	1:24.90	34	DNF			
Stepan Zuev	Slalom	DNF					

Women

Athlete	Event	Run 1		Run 2		Total	
Athlete	Event	Time	Rank	Time	Rank	Time	Rank
Kseniya Alopina	Slalom	58.37	29	53.37	20	1:51.74	23
Maria Bedareva	Downhill	—N/a				1:45.29	30
Maria Bedareva	Super-G	—N/a				DNF	
Maria Bedareva	Giant slalom	1:24.26	40	DNF			
Elena Yakovishina	Downhill	—N/a				1:44.45	28
Elena Yakovishina	Super-G	—N/a				1:29.38	24
Elena Yakovishina	Combined	1:44.91	19	53.97	16	2:38.88	14

== Biathlon ==
Based on their performance at the 2012 and 2013 Biathlon World Championships Russia qualified 6 men and 6 women. Irina Starykh originally qualified, but she withdrew from the team after testing positive for doping and was replaced by Olga Podchufarova. On 15 February 2020, the International Biathlon Union announced that because of a doping violation, Evgeny Ustyugov and Russian men's 4 x 7.5km relay team had been disqualified from the 2014 Olympics. The IOC results affirm the decision, but medals have not been reallocated yet.

Men

Athlete	Event	Time	Misses	Rank
Evgeniy Garanichev	Sprint	25:43.0	1 (0+1)	27
Evgeniy Garanichev	Pursuit	34:47.7	1 (0+0+0+1)	15
Evgeniy Garanichev	Individual	50:06.2	1 (0+1+0+0)	3rd place, bronze medalist(s)
Evgeniy Garanichev	Mass start	43:23.3	3 (0+1+1+1)	5
Alexander Loginov	Individual	53:04.3	2 (0+1+1+0)	DSQ (30th)
Dmitry Malyshko	Sprint	25:48.5	0 (0+0)	28
Dmitry Malyshko	Pursuit	36:17.0	2 (0+1+1+0)	33
Dmitry Malyshko	Mass start	44:42.9	4 (1+0+3+0)	20
Anton Shipulin	Sprint	24:39.9	1 (0+1)	4
Anton Shipulin	Pursuit	34:47.1	3 (0+1+1+1)	13
Anton Shipulin	Mass start	43:48.2	3 (0+1+1+1)	11
Evgeny Ustyugov	Sprint	25:19.1	1 (1+0)	DSQ (16)
Evgeny Ustyugov	Pursuit	34:25.3	1 (0+1+0+0)	DSQ (5)
Evgeny Ustyugov	Individual	53:47.8	3 (2+0+0+1)	DSQ (38)
Evgeny Ustyugov	Mass start	44:37.3	3 (0+0+1+2)	DSQ (19)
Alexey Volkov	Individual	56:30.3	4 (1+1+1+1)	64
Dmitry Malyshko; Anton Shipulin; Evgeny Ustyugov; Alexey Volkov	Team relay	1:12:15.9	8 (0+8)	DSQ (1)

Women

Athlete	Event	Time	Misses	Rank
Ekaterina Glazyrina	Individual	52:13.7	4 (1+0+2+1)	DSQ (61st)
Olga Podchufarova	Individual	50:13.3	2 (0+1+0+1)	49
Yana Romanova	Sprint	21:53.4	0 (0+0)	19
Yana Romanova	Pursuit	31:55.1	2 (0+1+1+0)	23
Yana Romanova	Individual	50:42.1	4 (1+1+2+0)	53
Ekaterina Shumilova	Sprint	23:38.4	2 (0+2)	60
Ekaterina Shumilova	Pursuit	34:34.2	3 (0+2+1+0)	47
Olga Vilukhina	Sprint	21:26.7	0 (0+0)	2nd place, silver medalist(s)
Olga Vilukhina	Pursuit	30:32.9	1 (0+1+0+0)	7
Olga Vilukhina	Mass start	38:05.3	2 (1+0+0+1)	21
Olga Zaitseva	Sprint	22:16.6	1 (1+0)	DSQ (28th)
Olga Zaitseva	Pursuit	30:43.0	0 (0+0+0+0)	DSQ (11th)
Olga Zaitseva	Individual	47:06.9	2 (0+0+1+1)	DSQ (15th)
Olga Zaitseva	Mass start	38:14.2	0 (0+0+1+0)	DSQ (23rd)
Yana Romanova; Olga Zaitseva; Ekaterina Shumilova; Olga Vilukhina	Team relay	1:10:28.9	4 (0+4)	DSQ (2nd)

Mixed

Athlete	Event	Time	Misses	Rank
Evgeniy Garanichev; Anton Shipulin; Olga Vilukhina; Olga Zaitseva	Team relay	1:11:04.4	9 (1+8)	DSQ (4th)

== Bobsleigh ==
Men

Athlete	Event	Run 1		Run 2		Run 3		Run 4		Total	
Athlete	Event	Time	Rank	Time	Rank	Time	Rank	Time	Rank	Time	Rank
Maksim Belugin; Alexander Kasjanov*	Two-man	56.69	11	56.60	2	56.44	6	56.57	2	3:46.30	DSQ (4)
Alexey Voyevoda; Alexandr Zubkov*	Two-man	56.25 TR	1	56.57	1	56.08 TR	1	56.49	1	3:45.39	DSQ (1)
Maksim Belugin; Ilvir Huzin; Alexander Kasjanov*; Aleksei Pushkarev	Four-man	55.11	6	55.41	5	55.29	3	55.21	1	3:41.02	DSQ (4)
Nikolay Khrenkov; Petr Moiseev; Maxim Mokrousov; Nikita Zakharov*	Four-man	55.74	16	55.53	14	55.88	=13	55.91	19	3:43.06	15
Alexey Negodaylo; Dmitry Trunenkov; Alexey Voyevoda; Alexandr Zubkov*	Four-man	54.82 TR	1	55.37	4	55.02	1	55.39	6	3:40.60	DSQ (1)

* – Denotes the driver of each sled

Women

Athlete	Event	Run 1		Run 2		Run 3		Run 4		Total	
Athlete	Event	Time	Rank	Time	Rank	Time	Rank	Time	Rank	Time	Rank
Olga Stulneva*; Liudmila Udobkina	Two-woman	58.03	8	58.24	7	58.45	9	58.74	=12	3:53.46	9
Nadezhda Paleeva; Nadezhda Sergeeva*	Two-woman	58.80	16	58.69	16	59.27	16	59.10	17	3:55.86	16

* – Denotes the driver of each sled

== Cross-country skiing ==
Russia qualified a maximum of 20 quotas (12 men and 8 women). For the first time since 1956, Russia (previously Soviet Union) failed to win a medal in women's cross-country skiing.

Distance
Men

Athlete	Event	Classical		Freestyle		Final		
Athlete	Event	Time	Rank	Time	Rank	Time	Deficit	Rank
Evgeniy Belov	15 km classical	—N/a				40:36.8	+2:07.1	25
Evgeniy Belov	30 km skiathlon	36:11.0	17	33:19.0	31	1:10:00.5	+1:45.1	19
Alexander Bessmertnykh	15 km classical	—N/a				39:37.7	+1:08.0	7
Ilia Chernousov	30 km skiathlon	36:12.8	18	31:36.7	1	1:08:29.0	+13.6	5
Ilia Chernousov	50 km freestyle	—N/a				1:46:56.0	+0.8	3rd place, bronze medalist(s)
Konstantin Glavatskikh	50 km freestyle	—N/a				1:50:33.4	+3:38.2	38
Dmitry Japarov	15 km classical	—N/a				40:10.7	+1:41.7	16
Alexander Legkov	30 km skiathlon	36:02.4	7	32:09.5	12	1:08:43.1	+27.7	11
Alexander Legkov	50 km freestyle	—N/a				1:46:55.2	+0.0	1st place, gold medalist(s)
Stanislav Volzhentsev	15 km classical	—N/a				40:15.0	+1:45.3	19
Maxim Vylegzhanin	30 km skiathlon	36:01.1	5	31:44.0	4	1:08:16.9	+1.5	4
Maxim Vylegzhanin	50 km freestyle	—N/a				1:46:55.9	+0.7	2nd place, silver medalist(s)
Alexander Bessmertnykh; Dmitry Japarov; Alexander Legkov; Maxim Vylegzhanin	4×10 km relay	—N/a				1:29:09.3	+27.3	2nd place, silver medalist(s)

Women

Athlete	Event	Classical		Freestyle		Final		
Athlete	Event	Time	Rank	Time	Rank	Time	Deficit	Rank
Yuliya Chekaleva	10 km classical	—N/a				29:36.1	+1:18.3	DSQ (11)
Yuliya Chekaleva	15 km skiathlon	19:50.6	16	19:44.6	12	40:11.6	+1:38.0	DSQ (15)
Yuliya Chekaleva	30 km freestyle	—N/a				1:15:46.6	+4:41.4	DSQ (32)
Julia Ivanova	10 km classical	—N/a				29:59.4	+1:41.6	DSQ (17)
Julia Ivanova	30 km freestyle	—N/a				1:15:22.1	+4:16.9	DSQ (30)
Irina Khazova	15 km skiathlon	20:04.9	28	20:16.5	28	41:00.3	+2:26.7	28
Irina Khazova	30 km freestyle	—N/a				1:15:19.2	+4:14.0	29
Olga Kuziukova	10 km classical	—N/a				29:41.9	+1:24.1	12
Olga Kuziukova	15 km skiathlon	19:39.2	12	20:29.0	34	40:43.2	+2:09.6	24
Natalia Zhukova	10 km classical	—N/a				29:15.5	+57.7	7
Natalia Zhukova	15 km skiathlon	19:48.2	13	19:52.2	15	40:15.5	+1:41.9	17
Natalia Zhukova	30 km freestyle	—N/a				1:12:56.7	+1:51.5	15
Yuliya Chekaleva; Julia Ivanova; Olga Kuziukova; Natalia Zhukova	4×5 km relay	—N/a				54:06.3	+1:03.6	DSQ (6)

Sprint
Men

Athlete	Event	Qualification		Quarterfinal		Semifinal		Final	
Athlete	Event	Total	Rank	Total	Rank	Total	Rank	Total	Rank
Anton Gafarov	Sprint	3:36.10	20 Q	3:38.52	2 Q	6:25.95	6	did not advance	
Nikita Kriukov	Sprint	3:34.04	11 Q	3:39.10	'3	did not advance			
Alexei Petukhov	Sprint	3:32.67	9 Q	3:36.39	2 Q	3:37.89	4	did not advance	
Sergey Ustiugov	Sprint	3:30.26	2 Q	3:36.14	1 Q	3:37.37	1 Q	4:32.48	5
Nikita Kriukov; Maxim Vylegzhanin	Team sprint	—N/a				23:26.91	2 Q	23:15.86	2nd place, silver medalist(s)

Women

Athlete	Event	Qualification		Quarterfinal		Semifinal		Final	
Athlete	Event	Total	Rank	Total	Rank	Total	Rank	Total	Rank
Anastasia Dotsenko	Sprint	2:38.14	22 Q	2:38.83	DSQ (5)	did not advance			
Irina Khazova	Sprint	2:48.64	50	did not advance					
Natalya Matveyeva	Sprint	2:40.15	29 Q	2:38.66	4	did not advance			
Yevgeniya Shapovalova	Sprint	2:37.03	19	2:38.83	6	did not advance			
Anastasia Dotsenko; Julia Ivanova	Team sprint	—N/a				16:49.61	3 q	16:44.91	DSQ (6)

== Curling ==
=== Men's tournament ===
Roster

Team: Andrey Drozdov, Aleksey Stukalskiy, Evgeniy Arkhipov, Petr Dron, Aleksandr Kozyrev

Standings

Final round robin standings
Team	Skip	Pld	W	L	PF	PA	EW	EL	BE	SE	S%	Qualification
Sweden	Niklas Edin	9	8	1	60	44	38	30	18	8	86%	Playoffs
Canada	Brad Jacobs	9	7	2	69	53	39	36	14	7	84%	Playoffs
China	Liu Rui	9	7	2	67	50	41	37	11	5	85%	Playoffs
Norway	Thomas Ulsrud	9	5	4	52	53	36	33	18	5	86%	Tiebreaker
Great Britain	David Murdoch	9	5	4	51	49	37	35	15	8	83%	Tiebreaker
Denmark	Rasmus Stjerne	9	4	5	54	61	32	37	17	4	81%	
Russia	Andrey Drozdov	9	3	6	58	70	36	38	13	7	77%	
Switzerland	Sven Michel	9	3	6	47	46	31	34	22	7	83%	
United States	John Shuster	9	2	7	47	58	30	39	14	7	80%	
Germany	John Jahr	9	1	8	53	74	38	39	10	9	76%	

Round robin

Russia has a bye in draws 4, 7 and 11.

Draw 1

Monday, 10 February, 9:00 am

Sheet A	1	2	3	4	5	6	7	8	9	10	Final
Russia (Drozdov)	0	0	0	0	1	0	1	0	2	X	4
Great Britain (Murdoch) 🔨	0	2	0	0	0	4	0	1	0	X	7

Draw 2

Monday, 10 February, 7:00 pm

Sheet B	1	2	3	4	5	6	7	8	9	10	11	Final
Denmark (Stjerne)	0	0	2	0	3	0	2	0	3	0	1	11
Russia (Drozdov) 🔨	2	3	0	1	0	1	0	2	0	1	0	10

Draw 3

Tuesday, 11 February, 2:00 pm

Sheet D	1	2	3	4	5	6	7	8	9	10	Final
Norway (Ulsrud) 🔨	2	1	0	2	0	2	0	2	0	0	9
Russia (Drozdov)	0	0	1	0	2	0	2	0	0	3	8

Draw 5

Wednesday, 12 February, 7:00 pm

Sheet C	1	2	3	4	5	6	7	8	9	10	Final
Russia (Drozdov) 🔨	0	1	0	1	0	0	0	2	0	X	4
Canada (Jacobs)	2	0	0	0	4	0	0	0	1	X	7

Draw 6

Thursday, 13 February, 2:00 pm

Sheet A	1	2	3	4	5	6	7	8	9	10	Final
Switzerland (Michel)	0	2	1	0	0	0	1	2	0	0	6
Russia (Drozdov) 🔨	0	0	0	0	2	1	0	0	1	3	7

Draw 8

Friday, 14 February, 7:00 pm

Sheet B	1	2	3	4	5	6	7	8	9	10	Final
Russia (Drozdov) 🔨	0	2	1	0	2	0	0	0	1	1	7
United States (Shuster)	0	0	0	3	0	2	1	0	0	0	6

Draw 9

Saturday, 15 February, 2:00 pm

Sheet D	1	2	3	4	5	6	7	8	9	10	Final
Russia (Drozdov)	0	0	2	0	1	0	1	0	2	X	6
China (Liu) 🔨	2	1	0	2	0	2	0	2	0	X	9

Draw 10

Sunday, 16 February, 9:00 am

Sheet C	1	2	3	4	5	6	7	8	9	10	Final
Sweden (Edin) 🔨	0	2	0	1	0	2	0	2	1	X	8
Russia (Drozdov)	0	0	2	0	1	0	1	0	0	X	4

Draw 12

Monday, 17 February, 2:00 pm

Sheet B	1	2	3	4	5	6	7	8	9	10	Final
Germany (Jahr)	0	0	2	0	2	0	1	0	1	1	7
Russia (Drozdov) 🔨	2	0	0	2	0	2	0	2	0	0	8

=== Women's tournament ===
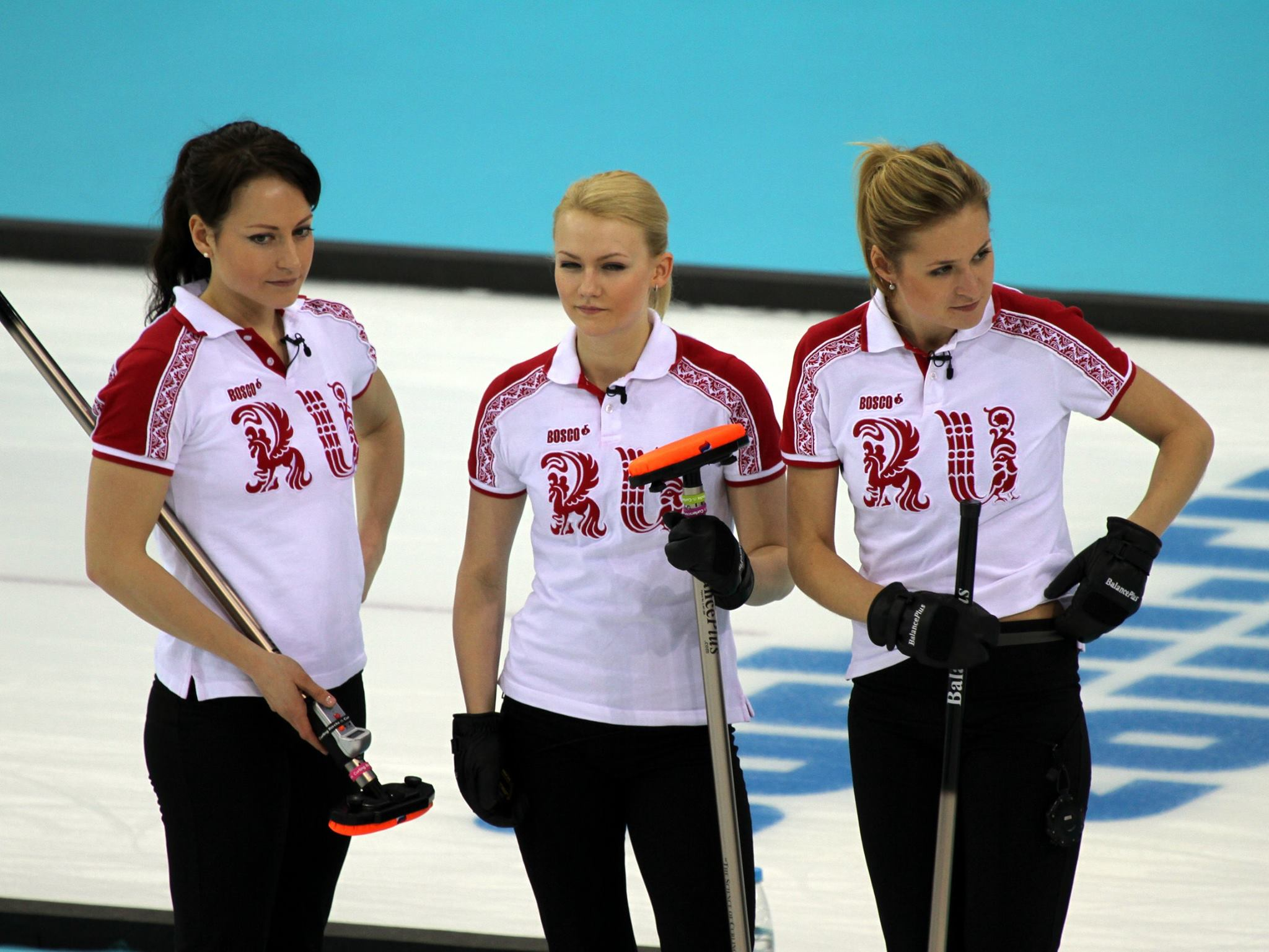
Russian women's team

Roster

Team: Anna Sidorova, Margarita Fomina, Alexandra Saitova, Ekaterina Galkina, Nkeirouka Ezekh

Standings

Final round robin standings
Team	Skip	Pld	W	L	PF	PA	EW	EL	BE	SE	S%	Qualification
Canada	Jennifer Jones	9	9	0	72	40	43	27	12	14	86%	Playoffs
Sweden	Margaretha Sigfridsson	9	7	2	58	52	37	35	13	7	80%	Playoffs
Switzerland	Mirjam Ott	9	5	4	63	60	37	38	13	7	78%	Playoffs
Great Britain	Eve Muirhead	9	5	4	74	58	39	35	9	11	80%	Playoffs
Japan	Ayumi Ogasawara	9	4	5	59	67	39	41	4	10	76%	
Denmark	Lene Nielsen	9	4	5	57	56	34	40	12	9	78%	
China	Wang Bingyu	9	4	5	58	62	36	38	10	4	81%	
South Korea	Kim Ji-sun	9	3	6	60	65	35	37	10	6	79%	
Russia	Anna Sidorova	9	3	6	48	56	33	35	19	6	82%	
United States	Erika Brown	9	1	8	42	75	33	40	8	5	76%	

Round robin

Russia has a bye in draws 5, 8 and 12.

Draw 1

Monday, 10 February, 2:00 pm

Sheet D	1	2	3	4	5	6	7	8	9	10	Final
Russia (Sidorova)	0	0	1	2	1	0	0	0	2	1	7
Denmark (Nielsen) 🔨	0	1	0	0	0	1	1	1	0	0	4

Draw 2

Tuesday, 11 February, 9:00 am

Sheet C	1	2	3	4	5	6	7	8	9	10	Final
Russia (Sidorova)	0	1	0	2	2	0	2	0	2	X	9
United States (Brown) 🔨	1	0	3	0	0	1	0	1	0	X	6

Draw 3

Tuesday, 11 February, 7:00 pm

Sheet D	1	2	3	4	5	6	7	8	9	10	Final
China (Wang) 🔨	0	0	1	0	0	2	0	3	0	1	7
Russia (Sidorova)	0	2	0	1	0	0	1	0	1	0	5

Draw 4

Wednesday, 12 February, 2:00 pm

Sheet A	1	2	3	4	5	6	7	8	9	10	Final
Japan (Ogasawara) 🔨	0	2	0	0	1	1	1	0	1	2	8
Russia (Sidorova)	0	0	1	1	0	0	0	2	0	0	4

Draw 6

Thursday, 13 February, 7:00 pm

Sheet B	1	2	3	4	5	6	7	8	9	10	Final
Russia (Sidorova) 🔨	1	0	1	0	1	0	0	1	0	X	4
South Korea (Kim)	0	2	0	2	0	0	3	0	1	X	8

Draw 7

Friday, 14 February, 2:00 pm

Sheet D	1	2	3	4	5	6	7	8	9	10	Final
Russia (Sidorova)	0	2	0	0	0	2	0	0	2	X	6
Switzerland (Ott) 🔨	1	0	0	1	0	0	0	1	0	X	3

Draw 9

Saturday, 15 February, 7:00 pm

Sheet B	1	2	3	4	5	6	7	8	9	10	Final
Canada (Jones)	0	0	3	0	2	0	0	0	0	X	5
Russia (Sidorova) 🔨	0	1	0	1	0	0	0	0	1	X	3

Draw 10

Sunday, 16 February, 2:00 pm

Sheet C	1	2	3	4	5	6	7	8	9	10	Final
Sweden (Sigfridsson)	0	0	0	2	0	0	0	1	0	2	5
Russia (Sidorova) 🔨	0	0	2	0	0	1	0	0	1	0	4

Draw 11

Monday, 17 February, 9:00 am

Sheet A	1	2	3	4	5	6	7	8	9	10	Final
Russia (Sidorova)	0	0	2	0	0	1	0	0	3	0	6
Great Britain (Muirhead) 🔨	0	1	0	2	0	0	0	4	0	2	9

== Figure skating ==
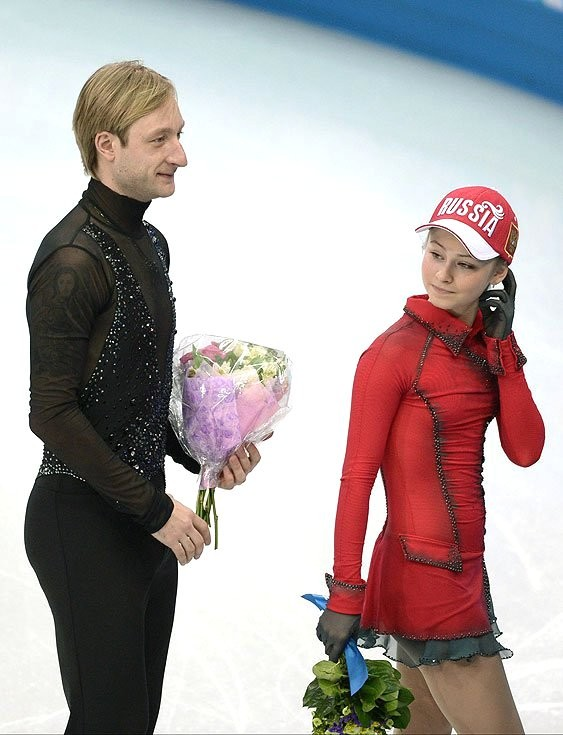
Evgeni Plushenko and Yulia Lipnitskaya after winning the team event

As hosts, Russia was guaranteed a skater in each event.

Russia captured the inaugural gold medal in the team event. Yulia Lipnitskaya, at 15, became the youngest Russian Winter Olympic medalist, while Adelina Sotnikova won the first ever Russian ladies figure skating gold medal.

Athlete	Event	SP/SD		FS/FD		Total	
Athlete	Event	Points	Rank	Points	Rank	Points	Rank
Evgeni Plushenko	Men's singles	Withdrew					
Yulia Lipnitskaya	Ladies' singles	65.23	5 Q	135.34	6	200.57	5
Adelina Sotnikova	Ladies' singles	74.64	2 Q	149.95	1	224.59	1st place, gold medalist(s)
Vera Bazarova / Yuri Larionov	Pairs	69.66	8 Q	129.94	6	199.60	6
Ksenia Stolbova / Fedor Klimov	Pairs	75.21	3 Q	143.47	2	218.68	2nd place, silver medalist(s)
Tatiana Volosozhar / Maxim Trankov	Pairs	84.17	1 Q	152.69	1	236.86	1st place, gold medalist(s)
Dmitri Soloviev / Ekaterina Bobrova	Ice dancing	69.97	5 Q	102.95	6	172.92	5
Elena Ilinykh / Nikita Katsalapov	Ice dancing	73.04	3 Q	110.44	3	183.48	3rd place, bronze medalist(s)
Victoria Sinitsina / Ruslan Zhiganshin	Ice dancing	58.01	16 Q	82.65	17	140.66	16

Team trophy

Athlete	Event	Short program/Short dance						Free skate/Free dance					
Athlete	Event	Men's	Ladies'	Pairs	Ice dance	Total		Men's	Ladies'	Pairs	Ice dance	Total	
Athlete	Event	Points Team points	Points Team points	Points Team points	Points Team points	Points	Rank	Points Team points	Points Team points	Points Team points	Points Team points	Points	Rank
Evgeni Plushenko (M); Tatiana Volosozhar / Maxim Trankov (P) (SP); Ksenia Stolbova / Fedor Klimov (P) (FS); Yulia Lipnitskaya (L); Ekaterina Bobrova / Dmitri Soloviev (D) (SP); Elena Ilinykh / Nikita Katsalapov (D) (FS)	Team trophy	91.39; 9	72.90; 10	83.79; 10	70.27; 8	37	1 Q	168.20; 10	141.51; 10	135.09; 10	103.48; 8	75	1st place, gold medalist(s)

== Freestyle skiing ==
Russia qualified a maximum of 26 athletes (14 women and 12 men). Among them, Maria Komissarova had qualified to compete, but was seriously injured at the start of the Games during training, in a fall that left her paralysed below the waist.

Aerials

Athlete	Event	Qualification				Final					
Athlete	Event	Jump 1		Jump 2		Jump 1		Jump 2		Jump 3	
Athlete	Event	Points	Rank	Points	Rank	Points	Rank	Points	Rank	Points	Rank
Ilya Burov	Men's aerials	105.88	10	86.73	10	did not advance					
Pavel Krotov	Men's aerials	106.33	9	115.05	3 Q	96.46	10	did not advance			
Timofei Slivets	Men's aerials	87.33	15	108.41	7	did not advance					
Veronika Korsunova	Women's aerials	72.50	10	81.58	4 Q	68.35	11	did not advance			
Aleksandra Orlova	Women's aerials	76.27	8	55.75	14	did not advance					
Assoli Slivets	Women's aerials	78.40	6 Q	Bye		62.30	12	did not advance			

Halfpipe

Athlete	Event	Qualification				Final			
Athlete	Event	Run 1	Run 2	Best	Rank	Run 1	Run 2	Best	Rank
Pavel Nabokikh	Men's halfpipe	13.40	50.40	50.40	24	did not advance			
Elizaveta Chesnokova	Women's halfpipe	43.80	50.00	50.00	19	did not advance			
Natalia Makagonova	Women's halfpipe	42.60	43.80	43.80	20	did not advance			

Moguls

Athlete	Event	Qualification								Final											
Athlete	Event	Run 1				Run 2				Run 1				Run 2				Run 3			
Athlete	Event	Time	Points	Total	Rank	Time	Points	Total	Rank	Time	Points	Total	Rank	Time	Points	Total	Rank	Time	Points	Total	Rank
Aleksey Pavlenko	Men's moguls	24.88	14.51	20.78	12	25.61	15.04	20.96	6 Q	24.90	15.40	21.66	16	did not advance							
Alexandr Smyshlyaev	Men's moguls	25.07	17.34	23.52	3 QF	Bye				25.14	17.92	24.37	1 Q	25.22	17.74	23.85	4 Q	24.94	18.10	24.34	3rd place, bronze medalist(s)
Andrey Volkov	Men's moguls	25.58	14.1	20.04	18	25.43	15.18	21.19	5 Q	26.17	15.98	21.64	17	did not advance							
Sergey Volkov	Men's moguls	27.64	5.8	10.77	24	DNF				Did not advance											
Elena Muratova	Women's moguls	31.65	12.56	17.95	18	33.36	11.54	16.64	11	Did not advance											
Marika Pertakhiya	Women's moguls	29.64	11.34	17.53	19	31.10	11.34	16.94	10 Q	31.11	11.98	17.58	17	did not advance							
Regina Rakhimova	Women's moguls	31.02	15.84	20.48	10 Q	Bye				31.84	15.88	21.19	6 Q	31.89	15.78	21.07	8	did not advance			
Ekaterina Stolyarova	Women's moguls	38.78	5.90	8.44	25	31.97	16.06	21.32	1 Q	34.85	6.88	10.99	19	did not advance							

Ski cross

Athlete	Event	Seeding		Round of 16	Quarterfinal	Semifinal	Final	
Athlete	Event	Time	Rank	Position	Position	Position	Position	Rank
Egor Korotkov	Men's ski cross	1:17.87	17	2 Q	2 Q	3 FB	1	5
Sergey Mozhaev	Men's ski cross	1:17.83	16	3	did not advance			21
Anastasia Chirtsova	Women's ski cross	1:25.99	21	4	did not advance			26
Yulia Livinskaya	Women's ski cross	1:24.21	14	2 Q	3	did not advance		11

Qualification legend: FA – Qualify to medal round; FB – Qualify to consolation round

Slopestyle

Athlete	Event	Qualification				Final			
Athlete	Event	Run 1	Run 2	Best	Rank	Run 1	Run 2	Best	Rank
Pavel Korpachev	Men's slopestyle	46.4	43.6	46.4	28	did not advance			
Anna Mirtova	Women's slopestyle	17.40	21.60	21.60	21	did not advance			

== Ice hockey ==
As hosts, Russia automatically qualified a women's team. The men's team qualified as being one of the 9 highest ranked teams in the IIHF World Ranking following the 2012 World Championships (and would have qualified automatically as hosts if it didn't qualify through rankings).

=== Men's tournament ===
Roster

The following is the Russian roster in the men's ice hockey tournament of the 2014 Winter Olympics.

Head coach: (Russia) Zinetula Bilyaletdinov Assistant coach: (Russia) Valery Belov

No.	Pos.	Name	Height	Weight	Birthdate	Birthplace	2013–14 team
1	G	Semyon Varlamov	185 cm (6 ft 1 in)	85 kg (187 lb)	27 April 1988	Kuybyshev, Soviet Union	(United States) Colorado Avalanche (NHL)
5	D	Ilya Nikulin	191 cm (6 ft 3 in)	98 kg (216 lb)	12 March 1982	Moscow, Soviet Union	(Russia) Ak Bars Kazan (KHL)
6	D	Nikita Nikitin	193 cm (6 ft 4 in)	89 kg (196 lb)	16 June 1986	Omsk, Soviet Union	(United States) Columbus Blue Jackets (NHL)
8	F	Alexander Ovechkin – A	189 cm (6 ft 2 in)	99 kg (218 lb)	17 September 1985	Moscow, Soviet Union	(United States) Washington Capitals (NHL)
10	F	Viktor Tikhonov	188 cm (6 ft 2 in)	83 kg (183 lb)	12 May 1988	Riga, Latvian SSR, Soviet Union	(Russia) SKA Saint Petersburg (KHL)
11	F	Evgeni Malkin	192 cm (6 ft 4 in)	86 kg (190 lb)	31 July 1986	Magnitogorsk, Soviet Union	(United States) Pittsburgh Penguins (NHL)
13	F	Pavel Datsyuk – C	180 cm (5 ft 11 in)	86 kg (190 lb)	20 July 1978	Sverdlovsk, Soviet Union	(United States) Detroit Red Wings (NHL)
15	F	Alexander Svitov	192 cm (6 ft 4 in)	106 kg (234 lb)	3 November 1982	Omsk, Soviet Union	(Russia) Ak Bars Kazan (KHL)
24	F	Alexander Popov	178 cm (5 ft 10 in)	82 kg (181 lb)	31 August 1980	Angarsk, Soviet Union	(Russia) Avangard Omsk (KHL)
26	D	Vyacheslav Voynov	180 cm (5 ft 11 in)	83 kg (183 lb)	15 January 1990	Chelyabinsk, Soviet Union	(United States) Los Angeles Kings (NHL)
27	F	Alexei Tereshchenko	180 cm (5 ft 11 in)	80 kg (176 lb)	16 December 1980	Mozhaisk, Soviet Union	(Russia) Ak Bars Kazan (KHL)
28	F	Alexander Semin	189 cm (6 ft 2 in)	95 kg (209 lb)	3 March 1984	Krasnoyarsk, Soviet Union	(United States) Carolina Hurricanes (NHL)
30	G	Alexander Yeryomenko	179 cm (5 ft 10 in)	75 kg (165 lb)	10 April 1980	Moscow, Soviet Union	(Russia) Dynamo Moscow (KHL)
41	F	Nikolai Kulemin	185 cm (6 ft 1 in)	100 kg (220 lb)	14 July 1986	Magnitogorsk, Soviet Union	(Canada) Toronto Maple Leafs (NHL)
42	F	Artem Anisimov	193 cm (6 ft 4 in)	88 kg (194 lb)	24 May 1988	Yaroslavl, Soviet Union	(United States) Columbus Blue Jackets (NHL)
43	F	Valeri Nichushkin	190 cm (6 ft 3 in)	80 kg (176 lb)	4 March 1995	Chelyabinsk	(United States) Dallas Stars (NHL)
47	F	Alexander Radulov	186 cm (6 ft 1 in)	91 kg (201 lb)	5 July 1986	Nizhny Tagil, Soviet Union	(Russia) CSKA Moscow (KHL)
51	D	Fedor Tyutin	188 cm (6 ft 2 in)	95 kg (209 lb)	19 July 1983	Izhevsk, Soviet Union	(United States) Columbus Blue Jackets (NHL)
71	F	Ilya Kovalchuk – A	188 cm (6 ft 2 in)	104 kg (229 lb)	15 April 1983	Kalinin, Soviet Union	(Russia) SKA Saint Petersburg (KHL)
72	G	Sergei Bobrovsky	188 cm (6 ft 2 in)	86 kg (190 lb)	20 September 1988	Novokuznetsk, Soviet Union	(United States) Columbus Blue Jackets (NHL)
74	D	Alexei Emelin	185 cm (6 ft 1 in)	97 kg (214 lb)	25 April 1986	Togliatti, Soviet Union	(Canada) Montreal Canadiens (NHL)
77	D	Anton Belov	192 cm (6 ft 4 in)	96 kg (212 lb)	29 July 1986	Ryazan, Soviet Union	(Canada) Edmonton Oilers (NHL)
79	D	Andrei Markov	183 cm (6 ft 0 in)	92 kg (203 lb)	20 December 1978	Voskresensk, Soviet Union	(Canada) Montreal Canadiens (NHL)
82	D	Yevgeny Medvedev	190 cm (6 ft 3 in)	87 kg (192 lb)	27 August 1982	Chelyabinsk, Soviet Union	(Russia) Ak Bars Kazan (KHL)
91	F	Vladimir Tarasenko	184 cm (6 ft 0 in)	95 kg (209 lb)	13 December 1991	Yaroslavl, Soviet Union	(United States) St. Louis Blues (NHL)

Group stage

Team	Pld	W	OTW	OTL	L	GF	GA	GD	Pts	Qualification
United States	3	2	1	0	0	15	4	+11	8	Quarterfinals
Russia	3	1	1	1	0	8	5	+3	6	
Slovenia	3	1	0	0	2	6	11	−5	3	
Slovakia	3	0	0	1	2	2	11	−9	1	

Source: IIHF

13 February 2014; 16:30	Russia	5–2 (2–0, 1–2, 2–0)	Slovenia	Bolshoy Ice Dome, Sochi; Attendance: 11,653

Game reference

Semyon Varlamov
Goalies
Robert Kristan
Referees:
(Canada) Dave Jackson
(Czech Republic) Vladimír Šindler
Linesmen:
(Canada) Lonnie Cameron
(Canada) Chris Carlson

A. Ovechkin (E. Malkin, A. Semin) – 1:17	1–0
E. Malkin (A. Ovechkin, E. Medvedev) – 3:54	2–0
	2–1	21:43 – Ž. Jeglič (M. Robar)
I. Kovalchuk (E. Malkin, A. Radulov) (PP) – 37:48	3–1
	3–2	38:52 – Ž. Jeglič (R. Sabolič, A. Kopitar)
V. Nichushkin (A. Tereshchenko) – 43:59	4–2
A. Belov (N. Nikitin, A. Tereshchenko) – 47:53	5–2

6 min
Penalties
6 min
35
Shots
14

15 February 2014; 16:30	United States	3–2 (SO) (0–0, 1–1, 1–1, 0–0, 1–0)	Russia	Bolshoy Ice Dome, Sochi; Attendance: 11,678

Game reference

Jonathan Quick
Goalies
Sergei Bobrovsky
Referees:
(United States) Brad Meier
(Sweden) Marcus Vinnerborg
Linesmen:
(Canada) Greg Devorski
(Canada) Jesse Wilmot

	0–1	29:15 – P. Datsyuk (A. Markov, A. Radulov)
C. Fowler (J. van Riemsdyk, P. Kessel) (PP) – 36:34	1–1
J. Pavelski (P. Kane, K. Shattenkirk) (PP) – 49:27	2–1
	2–2	52:44 – P. Datsyuk (A. Markov) (PP)

T. Oshie
J. van Riemsdyk (miss)
J. Pavelski (miss)
T. Oshie (miss)
T. Oshie
T. Oshie
T. Oshie (miss)
T. Oshie
Shootout
(miss) E. Malkin
(miss) P. Datsyuk
I. Kovalchuk
(miss) I. Kovalchuk
P. Datsyuk
I. Kovalchuk
(miss) P. Datsyuk
(miss) I. Kovalchuk
12 min
Penalties
10 min
34
Shots
31

A Russian goal scored late in the third period, which would have given the team a 3–2 lead, was disallowed after referees ruled that the net was moved when the goal was scored. The decision resulted in the score remaining 2–2. USA went on to win the game in a shootout, which resulted in Russia playing a playoff qualification game while USA received a bye to the quarterfinals. The decision was criticized by many Russian politicians, TV hosts and commentators. Following the game, protesters led by the Kremlin party's youth group held a demonstration in front of the U.S. Embassy in Moscow to protest the decision. In response to the controversy, Konstantin Komissarov, the referee supervisor of International Ice Hockey Federation, officially confirmed that the decision by the referee was correct, citing the appropriate use of video review in assessing the play.

16 February 2014; 16:30	Russia	1–0 (SO) (0–0, 0–0, 0–0, 0–0, 1–0)	Slovakia	Bolshoy Ice Dome, Sochi; Attendance: 11,097

Game reference
Semyon Varlamov	Goalies	Ján Laco	Referees: (Germany) Lars Brüggemann (Canada) Kelly Sutherland; Linesmen: (Canada) Chris Carlson (United States) Andy McElman
A. Radulov; I. Kovalchuk	Shootout	(miss) M. Handzuš; (miss) T. Tatar	Referees: (Germany) Lars Brüggemann (Canada) Kelly Sutherland; Linesmen: (Canada) Chris Carlson (United States) Andy McElman
4 min	Penalties	10 min	Referees: (Germany) Lars Brüggemann (Canada) Kelly Sutherland; Linesmen: (Canada) Chris Carlson (United States) Andy McElman
37	Shots	27	Referees: (Germany) Lars Brüggemann (Canada) Kelly Sutherland; Linesmen: (Canada) Chris Carlson (United States) Andy McElman

Qualification playoffs

18 February 2014; 16:30	Russia	4–0 (0–0, 2–0, 2–0)	Norway	Bolshoy Ice Dome, Sochi; Attendance: 11,423

Game reference

Sergei Bobrovsky
Goalies
Lars Haugen
Referees:
(Germany) Daniel Piechaczek
(Canada) Kevin Pollock
Linesmen:
(United States) Andy McElman
(Slovakia) Miroslav Valach

A. Radulov (P. Datsyuk) – 24:12	1–0
I. Kovalchuk (A. Radulov, P. Datsyuk) – 37:11	2–0
A. Radulov (P. Datsyuk) (EN) – 58:53	3–0
A. Tereshchenko (V. Tikhonov, V. Tarasenko) – 59:20	4–0

2 min
Penalties
6 min
31
Shots
22

Quarterfinals

19 February 2014; 16:30	Finland	3–1 (2–1, 1–0, 0–0)	Russia	Bolshoy Ice Dome, Sochi; Attendance: 11,654

Game reference

Tuukka Rask
Goalies
Semyon Varlamov (out 26:42)
Sergei Bobrovsky (in 26:42)
Referees:
(Canada) Kelly Sutherland
(Sweden) Marcus Vinnerborg
Linesmen:
(Canada) Greg Devorski
(Canada) Jesse Wilmot

	0–1	7:51 – I. Kovalchuk (P. Datsyuk) (PP)
J. Aaltonen (P. Kontiola) – 9:18	1–1
T. Selänne (M. Granlund) – 17:38	2–1
M. Granlund (T. Selänne, K. Timonen) (PP) – 25:37	3–1

6 min
Penalties
8 min
22
Shots
38

=== Women's tournament ===
On December 12, 2017, six Russian players were disqualified for doping violations and all results of the team were annulled. Tatiana Burina and Anna Shukina were also disqualified ten days later.

Roster

The following is the Russian roster in the women's ice hockey tournament of the 2014 Winter Olympics.

Head coach: (Russia) Mikhail Chekanov Assistant coach: (Russia) Yuri Novikov

No.	Pos.	Name	Height	Weight	Birthdate	Birthplace	2013–14 team
1	G	Anna Prugova	175 cm (5 ft 9 in)	62 kg (137 lb)	20 November 1993	Khabarovsk	(Russia) Tornado Moscow Region (RWHL)
2	D	Angelina Goncharenko	177 cm (5 ft 10 in)	71 kg (157 lb)	23 May 1994	Moscow	(Russia) Agidel Ufa (RWHL)
4	D	Alena Khomich	168 cm (5 ft 6 in)	53 kg (117 lb)	26 February 1981	Pervouralsk, Soviet Union	(Russia) Agidel Ufa (RWHL)
8	F	Iya Gavrilova	170 cm (5 ft 7 in)	63 kg (139 lb)	3 September 1987	Krasnoyarsk, Soviet Union	(Russia) Tornado Moscow Region (RWHL)
9	F	Alexandra Vafina	165 cm (5 ft 5 in)	58 kg (128 lb)	28 July 1990	Almaty, Kazakh SSR, Soviet Union	(Russia) Fakel Chelyabinsk (RWHL)
17	F	Yekaterina Smolentseva	176 cm (5 ft 9 in)	64 kg (141 lb)	15 September 1981	Pervouralsk	(Russia) Tornado Moscow Region (RWHL)
18	F	Olga Sosina	163 cm (5 ft 4 in)	77 kg (170 lb)	27 July 1992	Almetyevsk	(Russia) SKIF Nizhni Novgorod (RWHL)
20	G	Yulia Leskina	178 cm (5 ft 10 in)	76 kg (168 lb)	9 February 1991	Pervouralsk, Soviet Union	(Russia) Spartak-Merkuri Yekaterinburg (RWHL)
21	D	Anna Shukina	171 cm (5 ft 7 in)	76 kg (168 lb)	5 November 1987	Balakirevo, Soviet Union	(Russia) Tornado Moscow Region (RWHL)
23	F	Tatiana Burina	163 cm (5 ft 4 in)	68 kg (150 lb)	20 March 1980	Novosibirsk, Soviet Union	(Russia) Tornado Moscow Region (RWHL)
25	F	Yekaterina Lebedeva	165 cm (5 ft 5 in)	69 kg (152 lb)	14 September 1989	Sverdlovsk, Soviet Union	(Russia) Fakel Chelyabinsk (RWHL)
29	F	Anna Shokhina	163 cm (5 ft 4 in)	60 kg (132 lb)	23 June 1997	Novosinkovo	(Russia) Tornado Moscow Region (RWHL)
34	D	Svetlana Tkacheva	170 cm (5 ft 7 in)	60 kg (132 lb)	3 November 1984	Moscow, Soviet Union	(Russia) Tornado Moscow Region (RWHL)
44	D	Alexandra Kapustina	166 cm (5 ft 5 in)	74 kg (163 lb)	7 April 1984	Pervouralsk, Soviet Union	(Russia) SKIF Nizhny Novgorod (RWHL)
55	F	Galina Skiba	164 cm (5 ft 5 in)	66 kg (146 lb)	9 May 1984	Kharkiv, Ukrainian SSR, Soviet Union	(Russia) Tornado Moscow Region (RWHL)
70	D	Anna Shibanova	164 cm (5 ft 5 in)	62 kg (137 lb)	10 November 1994	Omsk	(Russia) Agidel Ufa (RWHL)
72	F	Yekaterina Pashkevich	174 cm (5 ft 9 in)	74 kg (163 lb)	19 December 1972	Moscow, Soviet Union	(Russia) Agidel Ufa (RWHL)
77	D	Inna Dyubanok	170 cm (5 ft 7 in)	74 kg (163 lb)	20 February 1990	Mozhaysk, Soviet Union	(Russia) Agidel Ufa (RWHL)
88	F	Yekaterina Smolina	164 cm (5 ft 5 in)	54 kg (119 lb)	8 October 1988	Ust-Kamenogorsk, Kazakh SSR, Soviet Union	(Russia) Tornado Moscow Region (RWHL)
95	F	Yelena Dergachyova	159 cm (5 ft 3 in)	57 kg (126 lb)	8 November 1995	Moscow	(Russia) Agidel Ufa (RWHL)
97	G	Anna Vinogradova	167 cm (5 ft 6 in)	69 kg (152 lb)	6 April 1991	Chelyabinsk, Soviet Union	(Russia) Fakel Chelyabinsk (RWHL)

Group stage

Team	Pld	W	OTW	OTL	L	GF	GA	GD	Pts	Qualification
Russia	3	3	0	0	0	9	3	+6	9	Quarterfinals
Sweden	3	2	0	0	1	6	3	+3	6	Quarterfinals
Germany	3	1	0	0	2	5	8	−3	3	5–8th place semifinals
Japan	3	0	0	0	3	1	7	−6	0	5–8th place semifinals

Source: IIHF

9 February 2014; 17:00	Russia	4–1 (0–0, 0–1, 4–0)	Germany	Shayba Arena, Sochi; Attendance: 5,048

Game reference

Yulia Leskina
Goalies
Viona Harrer
Referee:
(Finland) Anna Eskola
Linesmen:
(United States) Laura Johnson
(Czech Republic) Ilona Novotná

	0–1	26:48 – F. Busch (M. Anwander)
I. Gavrilova (A. Khomich, Y. Smolentseva) – 45:04	1–1
O. Sosina (I. Dyubanok, T. Burina) (PP) – 48:49	2–1
Y. Smolentseva (A. Shibanova) – 49:27	3–1
O. Sosina (I. Dyubanok, Y. Smolentseva) – 52:15	4–1

4 min
Penalties
8 min
37
Shots
15

11 February 2014; 19:00	Russia	2–1 (1–0, 0–0, 1–1)	Japan	Shayba Arena, Sochi; Attendance: 4,897

Game reference

Anna Prugova
Goalies
Nana Fujimoto
Referee:
(Germany) Nicole Hertrich
Linesmen:
(Canada) Denise Caughey
(United States) Alicia Hanrahan

T. Burina – 11:39	1–0
	1–1	40:33 – A. Toko (H. Kubo)
A. Vafina (SH) – 51:36	2–1

6 min
Penalties
6 min
38
Shots
22

13 February 2014; 21:00	Sweden	1–3 (0–1, 1–1, 0–1)	Russia	Shayba Arena, Sochi; Attendance: 5,092

Game reference

Valentina Wallner
Goalies
Anna Prugova
Referee:
(United Kingdom) Joy Tottman
Linesmen:
(Canada) Stephanie Gagnon
(United States) Alicia Hanrahan

	0–1	08:38 – A. Shukina (Y. Pashkevich, A. Shokhina)
	0–2	29:20 – A. Khomich (Y. Smolina)
P. Winberg – 38:58	1–2
	1–3	58:07 – Y. Smolentseva (O. Sosina)

14 min
Penalties
4 min
16
Shots
31

Quarterfinals

15 February 2014; 16:30	Switzerland	2–0 (1–0, 0–0, 1–0)	Russia	Shayba Arena, Sochi; Attendance: 4,962

Game reference
Florence Schelling	Goalies	Anna Prugova	Referee: (United Kingdom) Joy Tottman; Linesmen: (Sweden) Therese Bjorkman (Canada) Denise Caughey
S. Marty (A. Müller, S. Thalmann) – 10:46 / 1–0; L. Stalder (N. Bullo) (ENG) – 59:39 / 2–0			Referee: (United Kingdom) Joy Tottman; Linesmen: (Sweden) Therese Bjorkman (Canada) Denise Caughey
8 min	Penalties	2 min	Referee: (United Kingdom) Joy Tottman; Linesmen: (Sweden) Therese Bjorkman (Canada) Denise Caughey
27	Shots	41	Referee: (United Kingdom) Joy Tottman; Linesmen: (Sweden) Therese Bjorkman (Canada) Denise Caughey

5–8th place semifinals

16 February 2014; 21:00	Russia	6–3 (1–0, 3–2, 2–1)	Japan	Shayba Arena, Sochi; Attendance: 4,793

Game reference

Anna Prugova
Yulia Leskina
Goalies
Nana Fujimoto
Referee:
(Finland) Anna Eskola
Linesmen:
(France) Charlotte Girard
(Czech Republic) Ilona Novotná

A. Shukina (A. Shokhina) – 16:12	1–0
	1–1	26:14 – T. Yamane (R. Ukita)
A. Shokhina (Y. Smolentseva) – 26:44	2–1
	2–2	26:50 – A. Toko (H. Kubo)
G. Skiba (I. Gavrilova, T. Burina) – 27:33	3–2
O. Sosina (Y. Smolentseva, A. Shokhina) (PP) – 31:32	4–2
	4–3	42:23 – C. Osawa (T. Yamane, Y. Hirano)
G. Skiba (T. Burina, I. Gavrilova) (PP) – 49:39	5–3
T. Burina (A. Shibanova, A. Khomich) (PP) – 55:42	6–3

6 min
Penalties
10 min
32
Shots
27

Fifth place game

18 February 2014; 16:30	Finland	4–0 (2–0, 0–0, 2–0)	Russia	Shayba Arena, Sochi; Attendance: 4,112

Game reference

Noora Räty
Goalies
Anna Prugova
Referee:
(United States) Erin Blair
Linesmen:
(Canada) Stephanie Gagnon
(United States) Laura Johnson

L. Välimäki (K. Rantamäki, V. Hovi) – 16:37	1–0
R. Välilä (S. Tapani, J. Hiirikoski) – 17:28	2–0
M. Karvinen (R. Välilä, S. Tarkki) – 42:30	3–0
M. Karvinen (R. Välilä, M. Tuominen) (PP) – 43:31	4–0

14 min
Penalties
12 min
29
Shots
19

== Luge ==
Earning automatic places as a host nation, Russia has qualified a maximum of 10 spots (7 men, 3 women, and a relay team).

Men

Athlete	Event	Run 1		Run 2		Run 3		Run 4		Total	
Athlete	Event	Time	Rank	Time	Rank	Time	Rank	Time	Rank	Time	Rank
Albert Demchenko	Singles	52.170	1	52.273	2	51.707	2	51.852	2	3:28.002	2nd place, silver medalist(s)
Semyon Pavlichenko	Singles	52.660	6	52.593	10	51.928	4	52.255	14	3:29.355	5
Alexander Peretyagin	Singles	52.675	7	52.590	9	52.069	6	52.161	7	3:29.495	7
Alexander Denisyev; Vladislav Antonov	Doubles	49.936	6	50.013	7	—N/a				1:39.949	5
Vladimir Makhnutin; Vladislav Yuzhakov	Doubles	50.068	9	50.269	10	—N/a				1:40.337	9

Women

Athlete	Event	Run 1		Run 2		Run 3		Run 4		Total	
Athlete	Event	Time	Rank	Time	Rank	Time	Rank	Time	Rank	Time	Rank
Ekaterina Baturina	Singles	51.263	21	50.457	8	50.629	10	50.382	4	3:22.731	11
Tatiana Ivanova	Singles	50.457	4	50.492	10	50.450	6	50.607	9	3:22.006	7
Natalia Khoreva	Singles	50.500	8	50.348	4	50.599	9	50.620	11	3:22.067	8

Mixed team relay

Athlete	Event	Run 1		Run 2		Run 3		Total	
Athlete	Event	Time	Rank	Time	Rank	Time	Rank	Time	Rank
Vladislav Antonov; Albert Demchenko; Alexander Denisyev; Tatiana Ivanova	Team relay	54.429	3	56.245	2	56.475	3	2:46.679	2nd place, silver medalist(s)

== Nordic combined ==
Athlete	Event	Ski jumping			Cross-country		Total	
Athlete	Event	Distance	Points	Rank	Time	Rank	Time	Rank
Evgenii Klimov	Normal hill/10 km	99.0	124.7	3	28:04.0	45	28:21.0	45
Ivan Panin	Large hill/10 km	114.5	89.5	43	24:45.8	42	27:23.8	43
Evgenii Klimov; Niyaz Nabeev; Ivan Panin; Ernest Yahin	Team large hill/4×5 km	486.5	426.2	7	51:35.8	9	52:49.8	9

== Short track speed skating ==
As hosts, Russia have been given the maximum 5 men and 5 women to compete. On 10 February 2014, Viktor Ahn won the bronze medal in the 1500 m short track speedskating event. He won the first short track speedskating medal that Russia has earned while competing as Russia. On 15 February 2014, Ahn won the first Russian gold medal in short track at the 1000 m event, leading the first Russian 1-2 finish in short track, with Vladimir Grigorev winning silver. At 31 years and 191 days, Grigorev also became the oldest man to win a short track Olympic medal, with that silver. On 21 February 2014, he won the gold in the 5000 m relay, upping the oldest shorttrack male athlete record for both medals and gold medals.

Men

Athlete	Event	Heat		Quarterfinal		Semifinal		Final	
Athlete	Event	Time	Rank	Time	Rank	Time	Rank	Time	Rank
Viktor Ahn	500 m	41.450	1 Q	41.257	1 Q	41.063	1 Q	41.312	1st place, gold medalist(s)
Viktor Ahn	1000 m	1:25.834	1 Q	1:25.666	1 Q	1:24.102	1 FA	1:25.325	1st place, gold medalist(s)
Viktor Ahn	1500 m	2:20.865	1 Q	—N/a		2:16.000	2 Q	2:15.062	3rd place, bronze medalist(s)
Semen Elistratov	500 m	41.355	2 Q	PEN	4	did not advance			15
Semen Elistratov	1000 m	1:26.121	2 Q	1:24.239	2 Q	1:24.275	3 FB	1:29.429	6
Semen Elistratov	1500 m	2:16.904	2 Q	—N/a		2:14.783	4 FB	2:24.352	11
Vladimir Grigorev	500 m	41.883	2 Q	PEN	4	did not advance			16
Vladimir Grigorev	1000 m	1:26.422	1 Q	1:24.868	2 Q	1:25.346	1 FA	1:25.399	2nd place, silver medalist(s)
Viktor Ahn; Semen Elistratov; Vladimir Grigorev; Ruslan Zakharov	5000 m relay	—N/a				6:44.331	1 FA	6:42.100 OR	1st place, gold medalist(s)

Women

Athlete	Event	Heat		Quarterfinal		Semifinal		Final	
Athlete	Event	Time	Rank	Time	Rank	Time	Rank	Time	Rank
Olga Belyakova	1000 m	1:32.034	3	did not advance					20
Olga Belyakova	1500 m	2:29.880	2 Q	—N/a		2:20.391	5	Did not advance	14
Tatiana Borodulina	500 m	DSQ		did not advance					32
Tatiana Borodulina	1000 m	1:31.559	3	did not advance					19
Tatiana Borodulina	1500 m	DNF		—N/a		did not advance			35
Sofia Prosvirnova	500 m	44.94	2 Q	43.862	4	did not advance			15
Sofia Prosvirnova	1000 m	1:36.521	3	did not advance					24
Valeriya Reznik	500 m	45.349	3	did not advance					23
Valeriya Reznik	1500 m	PEN		—N/a		did not advance			36
Olga Belyakova; Tatiana Borodulina; Sofia Prosvirnova; Valeriya Reznik	3000 m relay	—N/a				4:13.938	3 FB	4:14.862	4

Qualification legend: ADV – Advanced due to being impeded by another skater; FA – Qualify to medal round; FB – Qualify to consolation round

== Skeleton ==
Russia qualified a maximum of 6 athletes (3 men and 3 women).

Athlete	Event	Run 1		Run 2		Run 3		Run 4		Total	
Athlete	Event	Time	Rank	Time	Rank	Time	Rank	Time	Rank	Time	Rank
Sergey Chudinov	Men's	56.98	5	57.04	11	56.86	6	56.71	6	3:47.59	5
Nikita Tregubov	Men's	57.44	13	56.96	7	56.57	3	56.65	3	3:47.62	6
Aleksandr Tretyakov	Men's	55.95	1	56.04	1	56.28	2	56.02	1	3:44.29	1st place, gold medalist(s)
Elena Nikitina	Women's	58.48	2	58.96	5	58.33	6	58.53	12	3:54.30	3rd place, bronze medalist(s)
Maria Orlova	Women's	58.97	5	59.02	6	58.30	5	58.43	8	3:54.72	6
Olga Potylitsina	Women's	59.00	6	58.75	3	58.13	2	58.52	11	3:54.40	5

== Ski jumping ==
Russia has qualified a total of six athletes (five men and one woman)

Men

Athlete	Event	Qualification			First round			Final			Total	
Athlete	Event	Distance	Points	Rank	Distance	Points	Rank	Distance	Points	Rank	Points	Rank
Ilmir Hazetdinov	Normal hill	96.0	113.7	18 Q	94.0	114.8	35	did not advance				
Ilmir Hazetdinov	Large hill	114.5	93.8	32 Q	124.5	111.3	30 Q	125.0	109.5	29	220.8	29
Denis Kornilov	Normal hill	92.0	109.6	25 Q	89.0	103.2	48	did not advance				
Denis Kornilov	Large hill	121.5	104.0	23 Q	125.0	109.7	31	did not advance				
Mikhail Maksimochkin	Normal hill	91.0	107.2	29 Q	104.0	129.6	10 Q	90.5	98.3	31	227.9	30
Alexey Romashov	Normal hill	90.5	102.6	39 Q	92.0	109.0	43	did not advance				
Alexey Romashov	Large hill	119.0	91.8	34 Q	120.0	93.6	46	did not advance				
Dimitry Vassiliev	Large hill	119.0	102.8	26 Q	130.5	116.8	25 Q	144.5	118.2	23	235.0	26
Ilmir Hazetdinov; Denis Kornilov; Alexey Romashov; Dimitry Vassiliev	Team large hill	—N/a			487.5	422.3	9	did not advance				

Women

Athlete	Event	First round			Final			Total	
Athlete	Event	Distance	Points	Rank	Distance	Points	Rank	Points	Rank
Irina Avvakumova	Normal hill	98.5	114.4	16 Q	94.5	107.8	19	222.2	16

== Snowboarding ==
Russia qualified a total of 15 athletes (11 men and 4 women). Vic Wild won two gold medals, which became the first ever gold medals for Russia in snowboarding. Alena Zavarzina won a bronze medal in giant parallel slalom.

Alpine
Men

Athlete	Event	Qualification		Round of 16	Quarterfinal	Semifinal	Final	
Athlete	Event	Time	Rank	Opposition Time	Opposition Time	Opposition Time	Opposition Time	Rank
Stanislav Detkov	Giant slalom	DSQ		did not advance				
Stanislav Detkov	Slalom	DSQ		did not advance				
Valery Kolegov	Giant slalom	1:40.69	19	did not advance				
Valery Kolegov	Slalom	DSQ		did not advance				
Andrey Sobolev	Giant slalom	1:35.62	1 Q	Prommegger (AUT); L +1.61	did not advance			
Andrey Sobolev	Slalom	1:02.70	27	did not advance				
Vic Wild	Giant slalom	1:35.88	2 Q	Dufour (FRA); W −5.65	S Schoch (SUI); W −4.19	Bussler (GER); W −2.61	Galmarini (SUI); W −2.14	1st place, gold medalist(s)
Vic Wild	Slalom	57.96	1 Q	Lambert (CAN); W −1.78	Fischnaller (ITA); W −0.52	Karl (AUT); W −0.04	Košir (SLO); W −0.11	1st place, gold medalist(s)

Women

Athlete	Event	Qualification		Round of 16	Quarterfinal	Semifinal	Final	
Athlete	Event	Time	Rank	Opposition Time	Opposition Time	Opposition Time	Opposition Time	Rank
Yekaterina Ilyukhina	Giant slalom	1:49.02	9 Q	Calvé (CAN); L +0.03	did not advance			
Yekaterina Ilyukhina	Slalom	1:06.73	29	did not advance				
Yekaterina Tudegesheva	Giant slalom	1:51.77	15 Q	Kummer (SUI); L +0.76	did not advance			
Yekaterina Tudegesheva	Slalom	1:05.54	16 Q	Kreiner (AUT); L +6.04	did not advance			
Natalia Soboleva	Giant slalom	DSQ		did not advance				
Natalia Soboleva	Slalom	1:05.48	15 Q	Ledecká (CZE); L +0.18	did not advance			
Alena Zavarzina	Giant slalom	1:47.65	6 Q	Jörg (GER); W −13.53	Lavigne (FRA); W −7.27	Kummer (SUI); L DSQ	Meschik (AUT); W −0.82	3rd place, bronze medalist(s)
Alena Zavarzina	Slalom	1:05.32	12 Q	Dujmovits (AUT); L +0.24	did not advance			

Freestyle

Athlete	Event	Qualification				Semifinal				Final			
Athlete	Event	Run 1	Run 2	Best	Rank	Run 1	Run 2	Best	Rank	Run 1	Run 2	Best	Rank
Nikita Avtaneev	Men's halfpipe	34.50	63.75	63.75	13	did not advance							
Pavel Kharitonov	Men's halfpipe	58.75	54.50	58.75	15	did not advance							
Sergey Tarasov	Men's halfpipe	23.00	39.50	39.50	18	did not advance							
Alexey Sobolev	Men's slopestyle	63.00	28.50	63.00	10 QS	20.00	57.50	57.50	12	did not advance			

Qualification Legend: QF – Qualify directly to final; QS – Qualify to semifinal

Snowboard cross

Athlete	Event	Seeding		Round of 16	Quarterfinal	Semifinal	Final	
Athlete	Event	Time	Rank	Position	Position	Position	Position	Rank
Andrey Boldykov	Men's snowboard cross	CAN		5	did not advance			=33
Anton Koprivitsa	Men's snowboard cross	CAN		5	did not advance			=33
Nikolay Olyunin	Men's snowboard cross	CAN		1 Q	1 Q	1 FA	2	2nd place, silver medalist(s)

Qualification legend: FA – Qualify to medal round; FB – Qualify to consolation round

== Speed skating ==
Based on the results from the fall World Cups during the 2013–14 ISU Speed Skating World Cup season, Russia earned the following start quotas:^{a}

Men

Athlete	Event	Race 1		Race 2		Final	
Athlete	Event	Time	Rank	Time	Rank	Time	Rank
Igor Bogolyubskiy	1000 m	—N/a				1:12.85	39
Artyom Kuznetsov	500 m	35.51	28	35.14	10	70.66	19
Denis Koval	500 m	35.19	14	35.24	15	70.44	13
Dmitry Lobkov	500 m	35.5	27	35.36	18	70.88	23
Dmitry Lobkov	1000 m	—N/a				1:10.65	27
Aleksandr Rumyantsev	5000 m	—N/a				6:24.93	11
Yevgeny Seryayev	10000 m	—N/a				13:28.61	9
Ivan Skobrev	1500 m	—N/a				1:47.62	18
Ivan Skobrev	5000 m	—N/a				6:19.83	7
Aleksey Suvorov	1500 m	—N/a				1:48.11	25
Aleksey Yesin	500 m	35.09	10	35.41	19	70.5	16
Aleksey Yesin	1000 m	—N/a				1:09.93	18
Aleksey Yesin	1500 m	—N/a				1:48.10	24
Denis Yuskov	1000 m	—N/a				1:09.81	17
Denis Yuskov	1500 m	—N/a				1:45.37	4
Denis Yuskov	5000 m	—N/a				6:19.51	6

Women

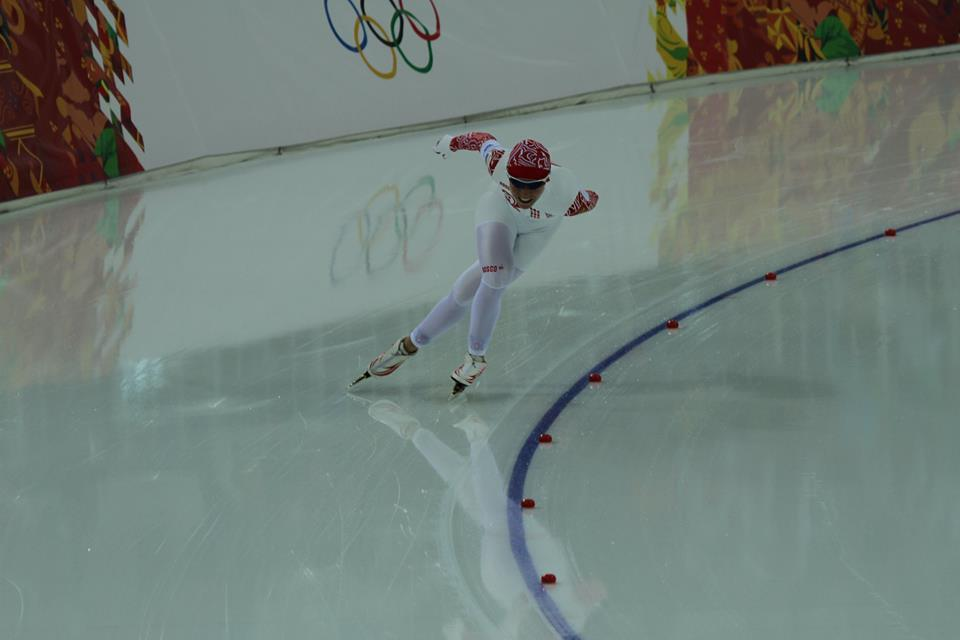
Olga Graf won bronze in the 3000 m

Athlete	Event	Race 1		Race 2		Final	
Athlete	Event	Time	Rank	Time	Rank	Time	Rank
Anna Chernova	5000 m	—N/a				7:08.71	9
Olga Fatkulina	500 m	37.57	2	37.49	2	75.06	2nd place, silver medalist(s)
Olga Fatkulina	1000 m	—N/a				1:15.08	4
Olga Fatkulina	1500 m	—N/a				1:57.88	9
Angelina Golikova	500 m	38.82	18	38.85	22	77.68	18
Olga Graf	3000 m	—N/a				4:03.47	3rd place, bronze medalist(s)
Olga Graf	5000 m	—N/a				6:55.77	4
Yekaterina Lobysheva	500 m	39.202	25	39.04	24	78.24	25
Yekaterina Lobysheva	1000 m	—N/a				1:17.31	20
Yekaterina Lobysheva	1500 m	—N/a				1:57.70	8
Yekaterina Malysheva	500 m	38.78	16	38.76	18	77.55	17
Yuliya Skokova	1000 m	—N/a				1:17.02	16
Yuliya Skokova	1500 m	—N/a				1:56.45	5
Yuliya Skokova	3000 m	—N/a				4:09.35	8
Yekaterina Shikhova	1000 m	—N/a				1:17.01	15
Yekaterina Shikhova	1500 m	—N/a				1:58.09	10
Yekaterina Shikhova	3000 m	—N/a				4:14.97	20

Team pursuit

Athlete	Event	Quarterfinal	Semifinal	Final	
Athlete	Event	Opposition Time	Opposition Time	Opposition Time	Rank
Aleksandr Rumyantsev; Ivan Skobrev; Aleksey Yesin; Denis Yuskov	Men's team pursuit	South Korea; L 3:44.22	Did not advance	Final C Norway; L 3:49.85	6
Olga Graf; Yekaterina Lobysheva; Yuliya Skokova; Yekaterina Shikhova	Women's team pursuit	Canada; W 3:01.53	Poland; L 3:02.09	Final B Japan; W 2:59.73	3rd place, bronze medalist(s)

^a Russia earned the max quotas (ten women and ten men) for speed skating, but only eight women competed. Viktoriya Filyushkina was a reserve for ladies' 3000 meter and Lada Zadonskaya was a reserve for ladies' 5000 meter. Both women qualified and were included in the Russian speed skating squad but did not get to compete by the decision of the Russian speed skating federation.

== Doping scandal after Olympics ==
In December 2014, German public broadcaster ARD aired a documentary which made wide-ranging allegations that Russia organized a state-run doping program which supplied their athletes with performance-enhancing drugs. In November 2015, Russia's track and field team was provisionally suspended by the IAAF.

In May 2016, The New York Times published allegations by the former director of Russia's anti-doping laboratory, Grigory Rodchenkov, that a conspiracy of corrupt anti-doping officials, FSB intelligence agents, and compliant Russian athletes used banned substances to gain an unfair advantage during the Games. Rodchenkov stated that the FSB tampered with over 100 urine samples as part of a cover-up, and that at least fifteen of the Russian medals won at Sochi were the result of doping.

In December, 2016, following the release of the McLaren report on Russian doping at the Sochi Olympics, the International Olympic Committee announced the initiation of an investigation of 28 Russian athletes at the Sochi Olympic Games. Italian newspaper La Gazzetta dello Sport reported the names of 17 athletes, of whom 15 are among the 28 under investigation. The Russian team potentially could be stripped of up to 12 Olympic medals.

Three ladies artistic skaters were named as being under investigation. They are Adelina Sotnikova, the singles gold medalist, as well as pairs skaters Tatiana Volosozhar and Ksenia Stolbova. Volosozhar and Stolbova won gold and silver medals, respectively, in pairs skating. Both also won gold medals in the team event, which also puts the other eight team medalists at risk of losing their golds.

Six skiers were suspended from competition on the basis of the McLaren report: Evgeniy Belov, Alexander Legkov, Alexey Petukhov, Maxim Vylegzhanin, Yulia Ivanova, and Yevgeniya Shapovalova. Legkov won a gold medal, and Vylegzhanin won three silver medals.

The International Biathlon Union suspended two biathletes who were in the Sochi games: Olga Vilukhina and Yana Romanova, according to La Gazzetta dello Sport. Vilukhina won silver in sprint, and both women were on a relay team that won the silver medal.

The International Bobsleigh and Skeleton Federation suspended four skeleton sliders. They are among the six athletes on the skeleton team: Nikita Tregubov, Alexander Tretyakov, Elena Nikitina, Maria Orlova, and Olga Potylitsina. Tretyakov won a gold medal, and Nikitina won a bronze.

== See also ==
- Russia at the 2014 Summer Youth Olympics
