= Speed skating at the Winter World University Games =

- Events: 14 (men: 7; women: 7)

Games
- 1959; 1960; 1961; 1962; 1963; 1964; 1965; 1966; 1967; 1968; 1970; 1970; 1973; 1972; 1975; 1975; 1977; 1978; 1979; 1981; 1983; 1985; 1987; 1989; 1991; 1993; 1995; 1997; 1999; 2001; 2003; 2005; 2007; 2009; 2011; 2013; 2015; 2017; 2019; 2023; 2025

Speed skating events have been contested at the Universiade since 1968. The sport has a special status at the event, because the host cities are not expected to build a speed skating rink specifically for the Winter World University Games. In years where the Winter World University Games do not take place, or do not include speed skating, the World University Speed Skating Championships are sometimes held instead.

== Editions ==
Games	Year	Host city	Host country	Winner	Second	Third
V	1968	Innsbruck	Austria	Soviet Union	West Germany	Japan
VI	1972	Rovaniemi	Finland	Soviet Union	West Germany	North Korea
VII	1972	Lake Placid	United States	Soviet Union	Netherlands	South Korea
XV	1991	Sapporo	Japan	Japan	Soviet Union	Netherlands
XVIII	1997	Jeonju	South Korea	Netherlands	Japan	South Korea
XXII	2005	Innsbruck	Austria	Netherlands	Japan	China
XXIII	2007	Torino	Italy	Netherlands	Italy	South Korea
XXIV	2009	Harbin	China	China	South Korea	Netherlands
XXVI	2013	Baselga di Piné	Italy	South Korea	Poland	Japan
XXVIII	2017	Almaty	Kazakhstan	South Korea	Russia	Italy
XXXI	2023	Lake Placid	United States	Japan	South Korea	Canada
XXXIII	2027	Changchun	China			

== Events ==
Event	68	70	72	91	97	05	07	09	13	17	23	Years
Men's 100 metres								•				1
Men's 500 metres	•	•	•	•	•	•	•	•	•	•	•	11
Men's 1000 metres				•	•	•	•	•	•	•	•	8
Men's 1500 metres	•	•	•	•	•	•	•	•	•	•	•	11
Men's 3000 metres	•		•									2
Men's 5000 metres	•	•	•	•	•	•	•	•	•	•	•	11
Men's 10000 metres		•		•	•	•	•	•	•	•		8
Men's mass start										•	•	2
Men's team pursuit							•	•	•	•	•	5
Women's 100 metres								•				1
Women's 500 metres		•	•	•	•	•	•	•	•	•	•	10
Women's 1000 metres		•	•	•	•	•	•	•	•	•	•	10
Women's 1500 metres		•	•	•	•	•	•	•	•	•	•	10
Women's 3000 metres		•	•	•	•	•	•	•	•	•	•	10
Women's 5000 metres				•	•	•	•	•	•	•		7
Women's mass start										•	•	2
Women's team pursuit							•	•	•	•	•	5
Mixed relay											•	1
Total	4	8	8	10	10	10	12	14	12	14	13	

== Medalists ==
=== Men ===
==== 100 m ====
Year	Gold	Silver	Bronze
1968-2007	not included in the program		
2009	(South Korea) Lee Kang-seok	(China) Zhang Yaoling	(China) Yu Fengtong
2011–2023	not included in the program		

==== 500 m ====
Year	Gold	Silver	Bronze
1968	(West Germany) Erhard Keller	(Japan) Keiichi Suzuki	(Japan) Takayuki Hida
1970	(West Germany) Erhard Keller	(Soviet Union) Valery Muratov	(Soviet Union) Valery Troicky
1972	(Norway) Ole Christian Iversen		(Norway) Per Bjørang
1972	(Netherlands) Jos Valentijn		(Norway) Per Bjørang
1975-1989	not included in the program		
1991	(Japan) Toshiyuki Kuroiwa	(Japan) Yasunori Miyabe	(Japan) Satoru Kuroiwa
1993-1995	not included in the program		
1997	(Japan) Hiroaki Yamakage	(South Korea) Lee Kyou-hyuk	(Japan) Keiju Takahashi
1999-2003	not included in the program		
2005	(Japan) Keiichiro Nagashima	(China) Zhang Zhongqi	(South Korea) Lee Kang-seok
2007	(South Korea) Lee Kang-seok	(South Korea) Lee Ki-ho	(South Korea) Mo Tae-bum
2009	(South Korea) Lee Kang-seok	(China) Yu Fengtong	(South Korea) Mo Tae-bum
2011	not included in the program		
2013	(Japan) Tsubasa Hasegawa	(Italy) Mirko Nenzi	(South Korea) Kim Sung-gyu
2015	not included in the program		
2017	(South Korea) Cha Min-kyu	(Japan) Koto Nakao	(South Korea) Kim Young-jin
2019	not included in the program		
2023	(Japan) Wataru Morishige	(Japan) Kazuya Yamada	(Poland) Marek Kania

==== 1000 m ====
Year	Gold	Silver	Bronze
1968-1989	not included in the program		
1991	(Japan) Toshiyuki Kuroiwa	(Japan) Yasunori Miyabe	(United States) Nathaniel Mills
1993-1995	not included in the program		
1997	(Japan) Hiroaki Yamakage	(Netherlands) Jan Nijboer	(Netherlands) Andre Zonderland
1999-2003	not included in the program		
2005	(Japan) Takaharu Nakajima	(Japan) Tadashi Obara	(Italy) Enrico Fabris
2007	(Italy) Enrico Fabris	(South Korea) Lee Kang-seok	(Netherlands) Lars Elgersma
2009	(South Korea) Mo Tae-bum	(Poland) Konrad Niedźwiedzki	(South Korea) Lee Kang-seok
2011	not included in the program		
2013	(Italy) Mirko Nenzi	(Poland) Jan Szymański	Sung Ching-yang
2015	not included in the program		
2017	(South Korea) Cha Min-kyu	(Netherlands) Martijn Renier Van Oosten	(Japan) Ryo Kosaka
2019	not included in the program		
2023	(Japan) Kazuya Yamada	(Japan) Taiyo Nonomura	(Canada) David La Rue

==== 1500 m ====
Year	Gold	Silver	Bronze
1968	(Soviet Union) Aleksander Chekulaev	(Soviet Union) Valery Bayonov	(Finland) Pekka Halinen
1968	(Soviet Union) Aleksander Chekulaev	(Soviet Union) Valery Bayonov	(Soviet Union) Arkady Kichenko
1970	(Soviet Union) Valery Troitsky	(Soviet Union) Aleksander Chekulaev	
1970	(Soviet Union) Valery Troitsky	(Soviet Union) Valery Lavrushkin	
1972	(Soviet Union) Valery Lavrushkin	(Netherlands) Harm Kuipers	(Netherlands) Ronnie Nooitgedagt
1975-1989	not included in the program		
1991	(Austria) Michael Hadschieff	(Austria) Zsolt Zakaris	(Japan) Toru Aoyanagi
1993-1995	not included in the program		
1997	(Netherlands) Jan Nijboer	(Netherlands) Patrick Van Failer	(South Korea) Lee Kyou-hyuk
1999-2003	not included in the program		
2005	(Italy) Enrico Fabris	(Netherlands) Rhian Ket	(Japan) Takaharu Nakajima
2007	(Italy) Enrico Fabris	(South Korea) Lee Kang-seok	(Netherlands) Lars Elgersma
2009	(South Korea) Mo Tae-bum	(Poland) Konrad Niedźwiedzki	(Russia) Aleksey Yesin
2011	not included in the program		
2013	(Poland) Jan Szymański	(Italy) Mirko Nenzi	(South Korea) Joo Hyong-jun
2015	not included in the program		
2017	(Russia) Kirill Golubev	(Netherlands) Martijn Renier Van Oosten	(Japan) Junya Miya
2019	not included in the program		
2023	(Japan) Taiyo Nonomura	(Japan) Kazuya Yamada	(Japan) Motonaga Arito

==== 3000 m ====
Year	Gold	Silver	Bronze
1968	(Soviet Union) Aleksander Chekulaev	(Finland) Pekka Halinen	(Soviet Union) Anatoly Nokhrin
1970	not included in the program		
1972	(Netherlands) Harm Kuipers	(Soviet Union) Valery Lavrushkin	(Soviet Union) Aleksander Chekulaev
1975-2023	not included in the program		

==== 5000 m ====
Year	Gold	Silver	Bronze
1968	(Soviet Union) Aleksander Chekulaev	(Soviet Union) Anatoly Nokhrin	(Japan) Yoshiaki Demachi
1970	(Soviet Union) Aleksander Chekulaev	(Soviet Union) Valery Troitsky	(Soviet Union) Valery Lavrushkin
1972	(Netherlands) Harm Kuipers	(Soviet Union) Valery Lavrushkin	(Soviet Union) Aleksander Chekulaev
1975-1989	not included in the program		
1991	(Soviet Union) Andrey Krivosheev	(Japan) Kazuiro Sato	(Netherlands) Ronald Bosker
1993-1995	not included in the program		
1997	(Netherlands) Carl Verheijen	(Belarus) Vitaly Novichenko	(Japan) Mamoru Ishioka
1999-2003	not included in the program		
2005	(Italy) Enrico Fabris	(Japan) Kesato Miyazaki	(Netherlands) Arjen van der Kieft
2007	(Netherlands) Mark Ooijevaar	(Russia) Ivan Skobrev	(Russia) Andrey Burlyaev
2009	(Netherlands) Arjen van der Kieft	(Netherlands) Renz Rotteveel	(Russia) Artyom Belousov
2011	not included in the program		
2013	(Poland) Jan Szymański	(Russia) Yevgeny Seryayev	(South Korea) Lee Jin-yeong
2015	not included in the program		
2017	(Italy) Davide Ghiotto	(Japan) Seitaro Ichinohe	(Austria) Linus Heidegger
2019	not included in the program		
2023	(Italy) Riccardo Lorello	(Italy) Daniele Di Stefano	(Japan) Motonaga Arito

==== 10000 m ====
Year	Gold	Silver	Bronze
1968	not included in the program		
1970	(Soviet Union) Aleksander Chekulaev	(Soviet Union) Valery Lavrushkin	(Japan) Osamu Naito
1972-1989	not included in the program		
1991	(Japan) Kazuhiro Sato	(Soviet Union) Andrey Krivosheev	(Netherlands) Ronald Bosker
1993-1995	not included in the program		
1997	(Netherlands) Carl Verheijen	(Netherlands) Jochem Uytdehaage	(Japan) Daisuke Yonekura
1999-2003	not included in the program		
2005	(Japan) Kesato Miyazaki	(Netherlands) Arjen van der Kieft	(Japan) Hiroki Hirako
2007	(Netherlands) Mark Ooijevaar	(Russia) Artyom Belousov	(South Korea) Kim Myung-seok
2009	(Netherlands) Arjen van der Kieft	(Russia) Artyom Belousov	(Netherlands) Renz Rotteveel
2011	not included in the program		
2013	(Netherlands) Pim Cazemier	(South Korea) Lee Jin-yeong	(Russia) Yevgeny Seryayev
2015	not included in the program		
2017	(Italy) Davide Ghiotto	(Japan) Masahito Obayashi	(South Korea) Moon Hyun-Woong
2019-2023	not included in the program		

==== Mass start ====
Year	Gold	Silver	Bronze
1968-2015	not included in the program		
2017	(Japan) Seitaro Ichinohe	(South Korea) Lee Jin-young	(Russia) Aleksander Razorenov
2019	not included in the program		
2023	(Canada) David La Rue	(Italy) Daniele Di Stefano	(Canada) Hubert Marcotte

==== Team pursuit ====
Year	Gold	Silver	Bronze
1968-2005	not included in the program		
2007	Italy	Russia	Poland
2009	Poland	South Korea	Russia
2011	not included in the program		
2013	South Korea	Russia	Italy
2015	not included in the program		
2017	South Korea	Japan	Netherlands
2019	not included in the program		
2023	Japan	South Korea	Canada

=== Women ===
==== 100 m ====
Year	Gold	Silver	Bronze
1968-2007	not included in the program		
2009	(China) Yu Jing	(China) Zhang Shuang	(South Korea) Lee Sang-hwa
2011–2023	not included in the program		

==== 500 m ====
Year	Gold	Silver	Bronze
1968	not included in the program		
1970	(Soviet Union) Nina Statkevich		(Soviet Union) Lyudmila Mironova
1970	(Soviet Union) Lyudmila Titova		(Soviet Union) Lyudmila Mironova
1972	(Soviet Union) Tatyana Averina	(South Korea) Choi Jung-hee	(Soviet Union) Natalia Solbatova
1975-1989	not included in the program		
1991	(South Korea) You Sun-hee	(Japan) Shiho Kusunose	(North Korea) Song Hwa-son
1993-1995	not included in the program		
1997	(China) Yang Chunyuan	(China) Li Yanzi	(South Korea) Chun Hee-joo
1999-2003	not included in the program		
2005	(China) Hui Ren	(Netherlands) Sanne van der Star	(Japan) Aya Kajiki
2007	(South Korea) Lee Sang-hwa	(China) Sheng Xiaomei	(China) Yu Jing
2009	(South Korea) Lee Sang-hwa	(China) Yu Jing	(China) Zhang Shuang
2011	not included in the program		
2013	(South Korea) Kim Hyun-yung	(South Korea) Park Seung-ju	(South Korea) Ahn Jee-min
2015	not included in the program		
2017	(South Korea) Kim Hyun-yung	(Japan) Arisa Tsujimoto	(Russia) Aleksandra Kachurkina
2019	not included in the program		
2023	(South Korea) Kim Min-sun	(Japan) Moe Kumagai	(South Korea) Park Chae-eun

==== 1000 m ====
Year	Gold	Silver	Bronze
1968	not included in the program		
1970	(Soviet Union) Nina Statkevich	(Soviet Union) Lyudmila Titova	(Soviet Union) Galina Nefedova
1972	(South Korea) Ok Chun Sun	(Soviet Union) Tatyana Gorobetz	(Soviet Union) Lyubov Sadchikova
1975-1989	not included in the program		
1991	(North Korea) Song Hwa-son	(South Korea) You Sun-hee	(China) Liu Yuexi
1993-1995	not included in the program		
1997	(South Korea) Chun Hee-joo	(Netherlands) Colette Zee	(China) Xu Yang
1999-2003	not included in the program		
2005	(China) Hui Ren	(Netherlands) Paulien van Deutekom	(Poland) Katarzyna Wójcicka
2007	(Russia) Yulia Skokova	(Japan) Nao Kodaira	(Poland) Katarzyna Wójcicka
2009	(China) Jin Peiyu	(China) Yu Jing	(Japan) Nao Kodaira
2011	not included in the program		
2013	(Japan) Miho Takagi	(South Korea) Kim Hyun-yung	(Russia) Angelina Golikova
2015	not included in the program		
2017	(Russia) Aleksandra Kachurkina	(South Korea) Kim Hyun-yung	(Kazakhstan) Yekaterina Aydova
2019	not included in the program		
2023	(South Korea) Kim Min-sun	(Poland) Iga Wojtasik	(South Korea) Park Chae-eun

==== 1500 m ====
Year	Gold	Silver	Bronze
1968	not included in the program		
1970	(Soviet Union) Nina Statkevich	(North Korea) Hwa Hanpil	(Soviet Union) Lyudmila Titova
1972	(Soviet Union) Natalia Solbatova	(South Korea) Ok Chun Sun	(Soviet Union) Tatyana Gorobetz
1975-1989	not included in the program		
1991	(Soviet Union) Natalia Polozkova	(Japan) Mie Uehara	(Netherlands) Carla Zijlstra
1993-1995	not included in the program		
1997	(Netherlands) Renate Groenewold	(China) Xu Yang	(Japan) Yayoi Nagaoka
1999-2003	not included in the program		
2005	(Netherlands) Paulien van Deutekom	(China) Hui Ren	(Netherlands) Jorien Voorhuis
2007	(Poland) Katarzyna Wójcicka	(South Korea) Lee Ju-youn	(Netherlands) Moniek Kleinsman
2009	(Japan) Nao Kodaira	(China) Dong Feifei	(China) Ji Jia
2011	not included in the program		
2013	(South Korea) Kim Bo-reum	(Poland) Natalia Czerwonka	(Russia) Yevgeniya Dmitriyeva
2015	not included in the program		
2017	(Russia) Aleksandra Kachurkina	(Japan) Nana Takahashi	(Kazakhstan) Yekaterina Aydova
2019	not included in the program		
2023	(South Korea) Park Ji-woo	(Poland) Natalia Jabrzyk	(Czech Republic) Veronika Antošová

==== 3000 m ====
Year	Gold	Silver	Bronze
1970	(Soviet Union) Kapitolina Seregina	(Soviet Union) Nina Statkevich	(North Korea) Hwa Hanpil
1972	(Soviet Union) Natalia Solbatova	(Soviet Union) Tatyana Gorobetz	(South Korea) Choi Jung-hee
1975-1989	not included in the program		
1991	(Netherlands) Carla Zijlstra	(Romania) Mihaela Dascălu	(Japan) Mie Uehara
1993-1995	not included in the program		
1997	(Netherlands) Renate Groenewold	(Japan) Emi Kuroba	(China) Xu Yang
1999-2003	not included in the program		
2005	(Netherlands) Moniek Kleinsman	(Netherlands) Jorien Voorhuis	(Russia) Galina Likhachyova
2007	(Austria) Anna Rokita	(Poland) Katarzyna Wójcicka	(South Korea) Lee Ju-youn
2009	(China) Fu Chunyan	(China) Dong Feifei	(Poland) Luiza Złotkowska
2011	not included in the program		
2013	(Czech Republic) Martina Sáblíková	(South Korea) Kim Bo-reum	(South Korea) Park Do-yeong
2015	not included in the program		
2017	(Belarus) Maryna Zueva	(Japan) Nana Takahashi	(Russia) Elena Sokhryakova
2019	not included in the program		
2023	(Canada) Laura Hall	(South Korea) Park Ji-woo	(Canada) Rose-Anne Grenier

==== 5000 m ====
Year	Gold	Silver	Bronze
1968-1989	not included in the program		
1991	(Germany) Heike Warnicke	(Netherlands) Carla Zijlstra	(Romania) Mihaela Dascălu
1993-1995	not included in the program		
1997	(Netherlands) Renate Groenewold	(Japan) Emi Kuroba	(South Korea) Park Jung-eun
1999-2003	not included in the program		
2005	(Netherlands) Jorien Voorhuis	(Austria) Anna Rokita	(South Korea) Lee So-yeon
2007	(Austria) Anna Rokita	(Netherlands) Moniek Kleinsman	(South Korea) Lee Ju-youn
2009	(China) Dong Feifei	(China) Fu Chunyan	(Poland) Luiza Złotkowska
2011	not included in the program		
2013	(Czech Republic) Martina Sáblíková	(South Korea) Kim Bo-reum	(South Korea) Park Do-yeong
2015	not included in the program		
2017	(Belarus) Maryna Zueva	(Japan) Nene Sakai	(South Korea) Lim Jung-soo
2019-2023	not included in the program		

==== Mass start ====
Year	Gold	Silver	Bronze
1968-2015	not included in the program		
2017	(Russia) Anna Pristalova	(Japan) Nene Sakai	(South Korea) Ye-Jin Jun
2019	not included in the program		
2023	(Japan) Misaki Shinno	(Japan) Yuka Takahashi	(Germany) Josephine Heimerl

==== Team pursuit ====
Year	Gold	Silver	Bronze
1968-2005	not included in the program		
2007	Netherlands	Russia	Japan
2009	China	South Korea	Poland
2011	not included in the program		
2013	South Korea	Japan	Italy
2015	not included in the program		
2017	South Korea	Russia	Japan
2019	not included in the program		
2023	Poland	South Korea	Japan

=== Mixed ===
==== Mixed relay ====
Year	Gold	Silver	Bronze
1968-2019	not included in the program		
2023	South Korea	Japan	Spain

== Medal table ==
Last updated after the 2023 Winter Universiade

Rank	Nation	Gold	Silver	Bronze	Total
1	South Korea (KOR)	21	20	25	66
2	Netherlands (NED)	18	15	12	45
3	Japan (JPN)	17	26	20	63
4	Soviet Union (URS)	17	15	12	44
5	China (CHN)	9	13	7	29
6	Italy (ITA)	9	4	3	16
7	Russia (RUS)	5	8	11	24
8	Poland (POL)	5	7	7	19
9	Austria (AUT)	3	1	1	5
10	Belarus (BLR)	2	1	0	3
11	Canada (CAN)	2	0	4	6
12	Czech Republic (CZE)	2	0	1	3
13	West Germany (FRG)	2	0	0	2
14	North Korea (PRK)	1	1	2	4
15	Germany (GER)	1	0	1	2
15	Norway (NOR)	1	0	1	2
17	Finland (FIN)	0	1	1	2
17	Romania (ROM)	0	1	1	2
19	Kazakhstan (KAZ)	0	0	2	2
20	Chinese Taipei (TPE)	0	0	1	1
20	Spain (ESP)	0	0	1	1
20	United States (USA)	0	0	1	1
Totals (22 entries)		115	113	114	342
