= Alexander Kasjanov =

Russian bobsledder (born 1983)

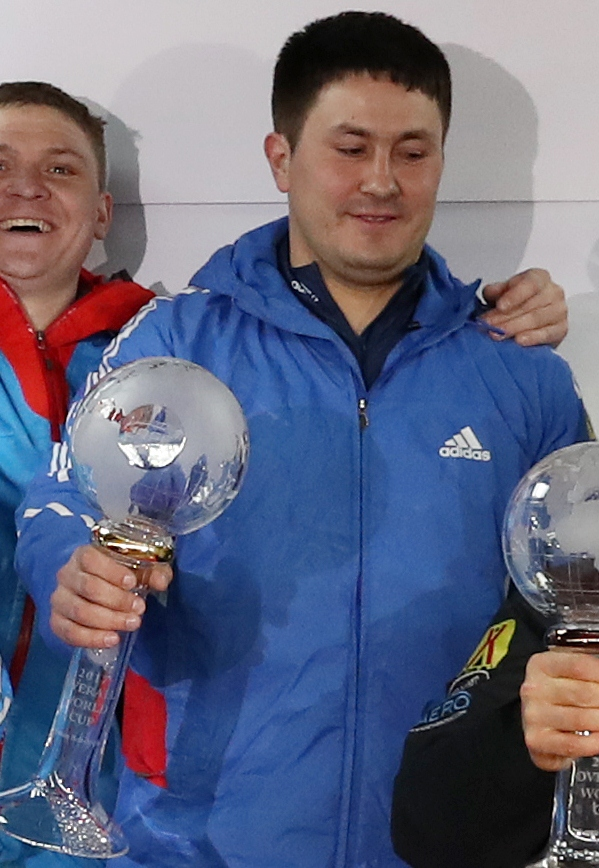

Personal information
- Nationality: Russian
- Born: 30 September 1983 (age 42) Bratsk, Soviet Union
- Height: 1.89 m (6 ft 2 in)
- Weight: 108 kg (238 lb)

Sport
- Country: Russia
- Turned pro: 2006
Medal record
World Championships
| Disqualified | 2015 Winterberg | Mixed team |
| Disqualified | 2016 Igls | Mixed team |

Alexander Vladimirovich Kasjanov (Russian: Александр Владимирович Касьянов, born 30 September 1983) is a Russian bobsledder who has competed since 2006. He has competed at the 2014 Winter Olympics, where he got 4th place in two-man and four-men event. On November 29, 2017, he was disqualified for doping and received a life-time ban from the Olympics.

== World Cup podiums ==
| Season | Date | Location | Teammates | Discipline | Place |
|---|---|---|---|---|---|
| 2010–11 | 15 January 2011 | Igls, Austria | Alexander Tretiakov; Olga Fedorova; Olga Potylitsina; Yulia Timofeeva; Aleksandr Shilkin | Mixed | 3rd |
| 2011–12 | 3 December 2011 | Igls, Austria | Alexander Tretiakov; Olga Fedorova; Olga Potylitsina; Yulia Timofeeva; Maxim Mokrousov | Mixed | 3rd |
| 2011–12 | 5 December 2012 | Whistler, Canada | Maxim Belugin; Denis Moiseychenkov; Nikolay Khrenkov | Four-man | 2nd |
| 2012–13 | 24 November 2012 | Whistler, Canada | Maxim Belugin; Ilvir Huzin; Nikolay Khrenkov | Four-man | 2nd |
| 2012–13 | 16 December 2012 | La Plagne, France | Petr Moiseev; Maxim Belugin; Ilvir Huzin | Four-man | 3rd |
| 2012–13 | 17 February 2013 | Sochi, Russia | Maxim Belugin; Ilvir Huzin; Kirill Antukh | Four-man | 3rd |
| 2013–14 | 7 December 2013 | Park City, United States | Philipp Egorov; Maxim Belugin; Aleksei Pushkarev | Four-man | 3rd |
| 2014–15 | 13 December 2014 | Lake Placid, United States | Maxim Mokrousov; Ilvir Huzin; Aleksei Pushkarev | Four-man | 2nd |
| 2014–15 | 1 February 2015 | La Plagne, France | Ilvir Huzin; Aleksei Pushkarev; Aleksey Zaytsev | Four-man | 2nd |
| 2014–15 | 15 February 2015 | Sochi, Russia | Ilvir Huzin; Aleksei Pushkarev; Aleksey Zaytsev | Four-man | 2nd |
| 2015–16 | 9 January 2016 | Lake Placid, United States | Aleksei Pushkarev; Ilvir Huzin; Aleksey Zaytsev | Four-man | 2nd |
| 2015–16 | 16 January 2016 | Park City, United States | Ilvir Huzin; Aleksei Pushkarev; Aleksey Zaytsev | Four-man | 1st |
| 2015–16 | 23 January 2016 | Whistler, Canada | Aleksei Pushkarev | Two-man | 3rd |
| 2015–16 | 24 January 2016 | Whistler, Canada | Aleksei Pushkarev | Two-man | 3rd |
| 2016–17 | 4 December 2016 | Whistler, Canada | Aleksey Zaytsev; Aleksei Pushkarev; Maxim Belugin | Four-man | 1st |
| 2016–17 | 1 January 2017 | Altenberg, Germany | Aleksei Pushkarev | Two-man | 2nd |
