= Ilvir Huzin =

Russian bobsledder (born 1990)

Personal information
- Nationality: Russian
- Born: 14 June 1990 (age 36) Neftekamsk, Russian SSR, Soviet Union
- Height: 1.90 m (6 ft 3 in)
- Weight: 94 kg (207 lb)

Sport
- Country: Russia
- Sport: Bobsleigh
Medal record
World Championships
Disqualified	2015 Winterberg	Mixed team

Ilvir Ildarovich Huzin (Russian: Ильвир Ильдарович Хузин; born 14 June 1990) is a Russian bobsledder.

== Career ==
Huzin competed at the 2014 Winter Olympics for Russia. He teamed with driver Alexander Kasjanov, Maxim Belugin and Aleksei Pushkarev as the Russia-2 sled in the four-man event, finishing fourth, missing out on the bronze medal position by three-hundredths of a second.

As of April 2014, his best showing at the World Championships is 11th, coming in the four-man event in 2012.

Huzin made his World Cup debut in November 2012. As of April 2014, he has three World Cup podium finishes, with the best a silver medal at Whistler in 2012-13.

On November 29, 2017, he was disqualified for doping.

== World Cup podiums ==
Season	Date	Location	Teammates	Discipline	Place
2012–13	24 November 2012	Whistler, Canada	Alexander Kasjanov; Maxim Belugin; Nikolay Khrenkov	Four-man	2nd
2012–13	16 December 2012	La Plagne, France	Alexander Kasjanov; Maxim Belugin; Petr Moiseev	Four-man	3rd
2012–13	17 February 2013	Sochi, Russia	Alexander Kasjanov; Maxim Belugin; Kirill Antukh	Four-man	3rd
2014–15	13 December 2014	Lake Placid, United States	Alexander Kasjanov; Maxim Mokrousov; Aleksei Pushkarev	Four-man	2nd
2014–15	1 February 2015	(Austria) La Plagne, France	Alexander Kasjanov; Aleksei Pushkarev; Aleksey Zaytsev	Four-man	2nd
2014–15	15 February 2015	Sochi, Russia	Alexander Kasjanov; Aleksei Pushkarev; Aleksey Zaytsev	Four-man	2nd
2015–16	9 January 2016	Lake Placid, United States	Alexander Kasjanov; Aleksei Pushkarev; Aleksey Zaytsev	Four-man	2nd
2015–16	16 January 2016	Park City, United States	Alexander Kasjanov; Aleksei Pushkarev; Aleksey Zaytsev	Four-man	1st
