= Maxim Belugin =

Russian bobsledder (born 1985)

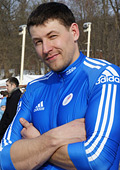

Personal information
- Nationality: Russian
- Born: 5 March 1985 (age 40) Krasnokamensk, Zabaykalsky Krai, Russian SSR, Soviet Union
- Height: 1.97 m (6 ft 6 in)
- Weight: 115 kg (254 lb)

Sport
- Country: Russia
- Sport: Bobsleigh (brakeman)

Maxim Eduardovich Belugin (Russian: Максим Эдуардович Белугин; born March 5, 1985) is a Russian bobsledder. In December 2017, he was one of eleven Russian athletes who were banned for life from the Olympics by the International Olympic Committee, after doping offences at the 2014 Winter Olympics.

== Career ==
Belugin competed at the 2014 Winter Olympics for Russia. He teamed with driver Alexander Kasjanov in the Russia-2 sled in the two-man event and with Kasjanov, Ilvir Huzin and Aleksei Pushkarev in the four-man event, finishing fourth in both competitions, missing out on the bronze medal position by three-hundredths of a second in each event. All three of his teammates were later disqualified and banned for life from the Olympics for doping offences, and the result of the team was annulled.

As of April 2014, his best showing at the World Championships is 6th, in the 2011 mixed team event. His best finish in an Olympic discipline is 10th, coming in the four-man event in both 2011 and 2013.

Belugin made his World Cup debut in November 2008. As of April 2014, he has five World Cup podium finishes, with the best a pair of silver medals at Whistler.

== World Cup podiums ==
Season	Date	Location	Teammates	Discipline	Place
2011–12	5 February 2012	Whistler, Canada	Four-man	Alexander Kasjanov; Denis Moiseychenkov; Nikolay Khrenkov	2nd
2012–13	24 November 2012	Whistler, Canada	Four-man	Alexander Kasjanov; Ilvir Khuzin; Nikolay Khrenkov	2nd
2012–13	16 December 2012	La Plagne, France	Four-man	Alexander Kasjanov; Ilvir Khuzin; Petr Moiseev	3rd
2012–13	17 February 2013	Sochi, Russia	Four-man	Alexander Kasjanov; Ilvir Khuzin; Kirill Antukh	3rd
2013–14	7 December 2013	Park City, United States	Four-man	Alexander Kasjanov; Philipp Egorov; Aleksei Pushkarev	3rd
2016–17	4 December 2016	Whistler, Canada	Four-man	Alexander Kasjanov; Philipp Egorov; Aleksei Pushkarev	1st
