= Aleksei Pushkarev =

Russian bobsledder

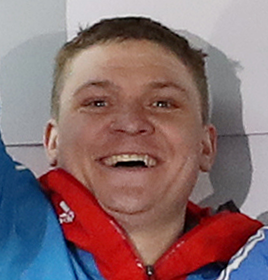
- Pushkarev at IBSF World Cup in 2017

Personal information
- Full name: Aleksei Sergeyevich Pushkarev
- Nationality: Russian
- Born: 4 November 1986 (age 39) Staronizhestebliyevskaya, Russian SSR, Soviet Union (now Russia)
- Height: 1.82 m (6 ft 0 in)
- Weight: 90 kg (198 lb)

Sport
- Country: Russia
- Sport: Bobsleigh

Aleksei Sergeyevich Pushkarev (Russian: Алексей Сергеевич Пушкарёв; born 4 November 1986), also known as Aleksey Pushkaryov, is a Russian bobsledder.

== Career ==
Pushkarev competed in the 2014 Winter Olympics for Russia. He teamed with driver Alexander Kasjanov, Maxim Belugin and Ilvir Huzin as the Russia-2 bobsledding team in the four-man event, finishing fourth, missing out on the bronze medal position by three-hundredths of a second.

As of April 2014, his best showing at the World Championships is 11th, coming in the four-man event in 2013.

Pushkarev made his World Cup debut in December 2012. As of April 2014, he has two World Cup podium finishes, a pair of bronze medals in 2013-14.

On 29 November 2017, he was disqualified for doping.

== World Cup podiums ==
Season	Date	Location	Teammates	Discipline	Place
2013–14	7 December 2013	Park City, United States	Alexander Kasjanov; Philipp Egorov; Maxim Belugin	Four-man	3rd
2013–14	4 January 2014	Winterberg, Germany	Alexander Zubkov; Alexey Negodaylo; Dmitry Trunenkov	Four-man	3rd
2014–15	13 December 2014	Lake Placid, United States	Alexander Kasjanov; Maxim Mokrousov; Ilvir Huzin	Four-man	2nd
2014–15	1 February 2015	(Austria) La Plagne, France	Alexander Kasjanov; Ilvir Huzin; Aleksey Zaytsev	Four-man	2nd
2014–15	15 February 2015	Sochi, Russia	Alexander Kasjanov; Ilvir Huzin; Aleksey Zaytsev	Four-man	2nd
2015–16	9 January 2016	Lake Placid, United States	Alexander Kasjanov; Ilvir Huzin; Aleksey Zaytsev	Four-man	2nd
2015–16	16 January 2016	Park City, United States	Alexander Kasjanov; Ilvir Huzin; Aleksey Zaytsev	Four-man	1st
2015–16	23 January 2016	Whistler, Canada	Alexander Kasjanov	Two-man	3rd
2015–16	24 January 2016	Whistler, Canada	Alexander Kasjanov	Two-man	3rd
2016–17	4 December 2016	Whistler, Canada	Alexander Kasjanov; Aleksey Zaytsev; Maxim Belugin	Four-man	1st
2016–17	1 January 2017	Altenberg, Germany	Alexander Kasjanov	Two-man	2nd
