= Yamakage =

Yamakage (written: 山影) is a Japanese surname. Notable people with the surname include:

- Hiroaki Yamakage (山影 博明, born 1974), Japanese speed skater
- Takeshi Yamakage (山影 武士, born 1945), Japanese swimmer
