= Antyukh =

Antyukh or Antukh (Cyrillic: Антюх or Антух) is a gender-neutral Belarusian surname derived from the masculine given name Anton. The surname may refer to the following notable people:

- Denys Antyukh (born 1997), Ukrainian football midfielder
- Kirill Antyukh (born 1986), Russian bobsledder
- Natalya Antyukh (born 1981), Russian sprint runner
