= Speed skating at the 2013 Winter Universiade =

Speed skating at the XXVI Winter Universiade
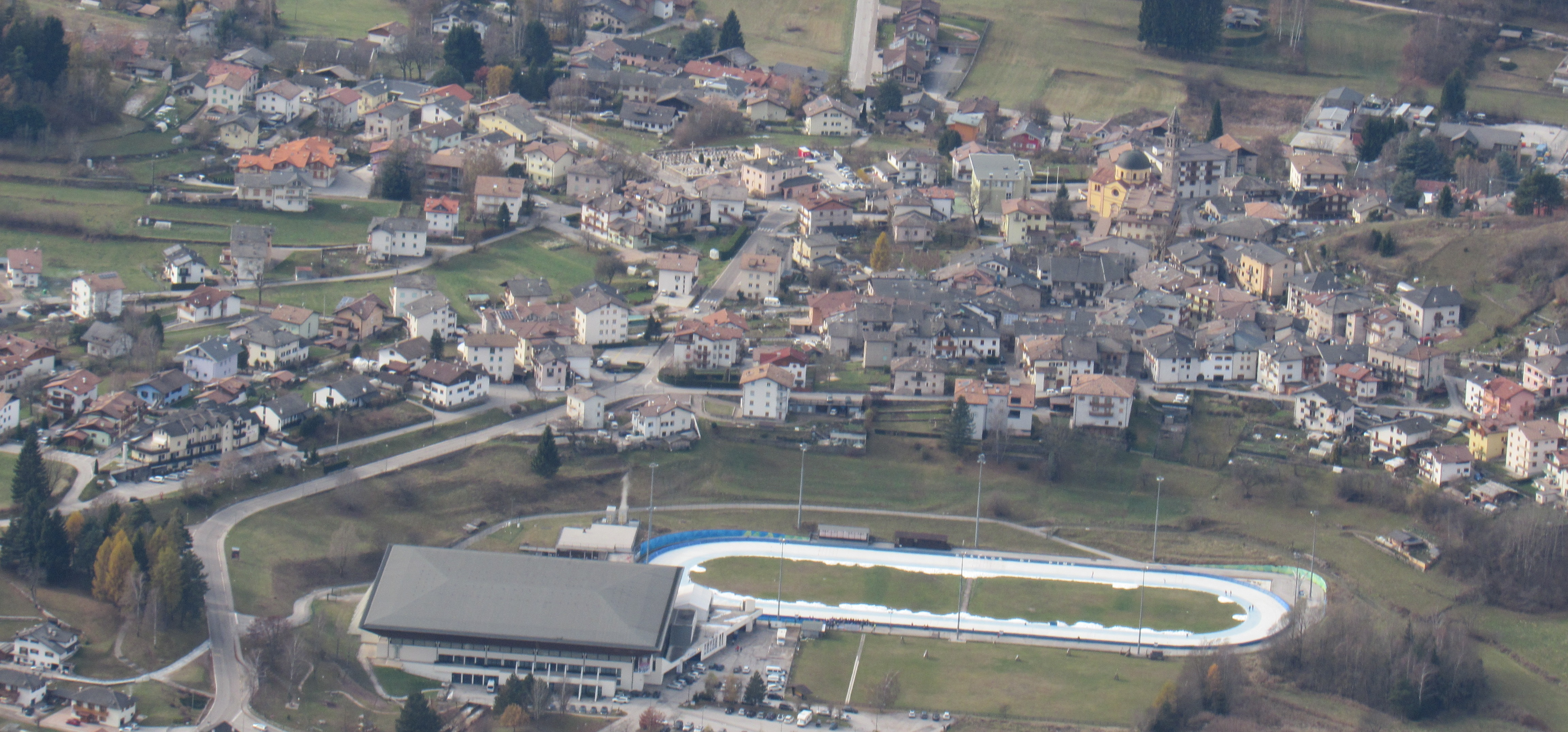
- Venue: Ice Rink Piné
- Dates: 13 – 19 December 2013

Speed skating at the 2013 Winter Universiade was held at Baselga di Piné Stadio del Ghiaccio from 13 to 19 December 2013.

== Men's events ==
Event	Gold		Silver		Bronze	
500 meters × 2	Tsubasa Hasegawa; Japan	71.00	Mirko Giacomo Nenzi; Italy	71.25	Kim Sung-gyu; South Korea	71.36
1000 metres	Mirko Giacomo Nenzi; Italy	1:09.32 (UR)	Jan Szymański; Poland	1:10.30	Sung Ching-yang; Chinese Taipei	1:10.64
1500 metres	Jan Szymański; Poland	1:47.80	Mirko Giacomo Nenzi; Italy	1:48.54	Joo Hyong-jun; South Korea	1:48.74
5000 metres	Jan Szymański; Poland	6:32.47	Yevgeny Seryayev; Russia	6:34.10	Lee Jin-yeong; South Korea	6:37.26
10000 metres	Pim Cazemier; Netherlands	13:44.19	Lee Jin-yeong; South Korea	13:48.32	Yevgeny Seryayev; Russia	13:50.72
Team pursuit	South Korea (KOR); Joo Hyong-jun; Kim Cheol-min; Ko Byung-wook		Russia (RUS); Dmitrii Fedotov; Kirill Golubev; Yevgeny Seryayev		Italy (ITA); Jan Daldossi; Andrea Giovannini; Mirko Giacomo Nenzi; Andrea Stefani	

== Women's events ==
Event	Gold		Silver		Bronze	
500 meters × 2	Kim Hyun-yung; South Korea	79.03	Park Seung-ju; South Korea	79.17	Ahn Jee-min; South Korea	79.45
1000 metres	Miho Takagi; Japan	1:19.58	Kim Hyun-yung; South Korea	1:19.84	Angelina Golikova; Russia	1:19.85
1500 metres	Kim Bo-reum; South Korea	2:02.19	Natalia Czerwonka; Poland	2:02.33	Yevgeniya Dmitriyeva; Russia	2:03.81
3000 metres	Martina Sáblíková; Czech Republic	4:13.72	Kim Bo-reum; South Korea	4:17.27	Park Do-yeong; South Korea	4:19.05
5000 metres	Martina Sáblíková; Czech Republic	7:05.17 (UR)	Kim Bo-reum; South Korea	7:17.82	Park Do-yeong; South Korea	7:26.58
Team pursuit	South Korea (KOR); Kim Bo-reum; Park Do-yeong; Yang Shin-young		Japan (JPN); Yuka Abe; Chinatsu Nagaya; Nana Takahashi		Italy (ITA); Francesca Bettrone; Francesca Lollobrigida; Giulia Lollobrigida	
