= Staronizhestebliyevskaya =

Staronizhestebliyevskaya Старонижестеблиевская
- Rural locality
- Location within Krasnodar Krai Location within Russia
- Coordinates: 45°22′31″N 38°26′41″E
- Country: Russia
- Region: Krasnodar Krai
- District: Krasnoarmeysky District
- Time zone: UTC+3:00

Staronizhestebliyevskaya (Russian: Старонижестеблие́вская) is a rural locality (a stanitsa) in Krasnoarmeysky District of Krasnodar Krai, Russia. Population: 10,260 (2010 census); 10,344 (2002 census);
