= Speed skating at the 2017 Winter Universiade =

Speed skating at the XXVIII Winter Universiade
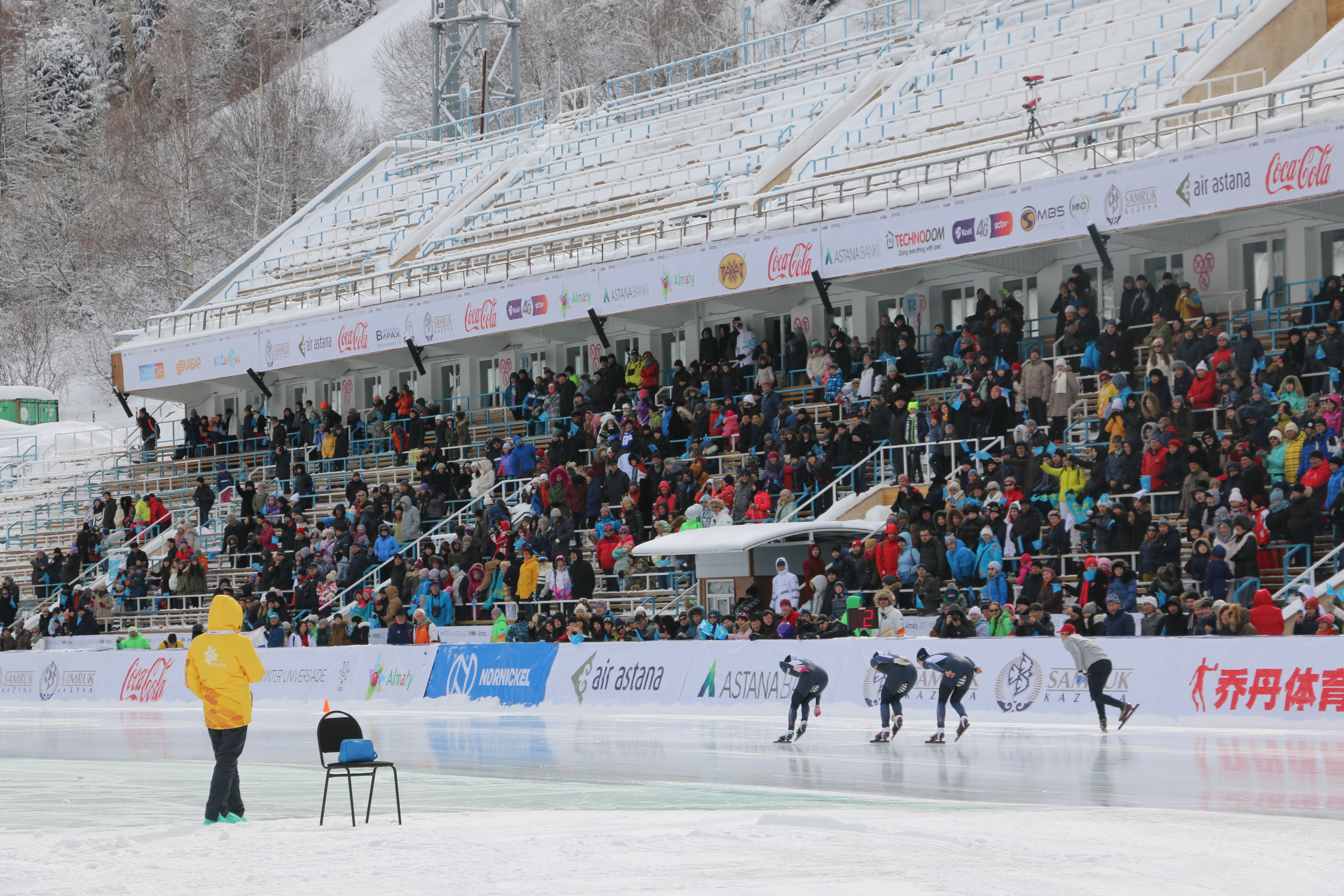
- Venue: Medeu High Mountain Ice Rink
- Dates: 31 January – 6 February 2017

Speed skating at the 2017 Winter Universiade was held at the Medeu High Mountain Ice Rink from 31 January to 6 February 2017.

== Medal table ==
Rank	Nation	Gold	Silver	Bronze	Total
1	South Korea (KOR)	5	2	4	11
2	Russia (RUS)	4	1	3	8
3	Belarus (BLR)	2	0	0	2
3	Italy (ITA)	2	0	0	2
5	Japan (JPN)	1	9	3	13
6	Netherlands (NED)	0	2	1	3
7	Kazakhstan (KAZ)*	0	0	2	2
8	Austria (AUT)	0	0	1	1
Totals (8 entries)		14	14	14	42

== Men's events ==
Event	Gold		Silver		Bronze	
500 meters × 2	(South Korea) Cha Min-kyu	70.40	(Japan) Koto Nakao	70.76	(South Korea) Kim Young-jin	71.13
1000 metres	(South Korea) Cha Min-kyu	1:09.56	(Netherlands) Martijn van Oosten	1:10.12	(Japan) Ryu Kosaka	1:10.58
1500 metres	(Russia) Kirill Golubev	1:49.30	(Netherlands) Martijn van Oosten	1:49.53	(Japan) Junya Miwa	1:49.61
5000 metres	(Italy) Davide Ghiotto	6:51.64	(Japan) Seitaro Ichinohe	6:52.94	(Austria) Linus Heidegger	6:55.46
10000 metres	(Italy) Davide Ghiotto	13:48.12	(Japan) Masahito Obayashi	14:24.95	(South Korea) Moon Hyun-woong	14:26.00
Mass start	(Japan) Seitaro Ichinohe	65 pts	(South Korea) Lee Jin-yeong	40 pts	(Russia) Aleksandr Razorenov	20 pts
Team pursuit	South Korea (KOR); Lee Jin-yeong; Moon Hyun-woong; Oh Hyun-min		Japan (JPN); Seitaro Ichinohe; Junya Miwa; Shohya Ogawa		Netherlands (NED); Olof Gerritsen; Ronald Ligtenberg; Jacob Vreugdenhil; Gerwin Coljé	

== Women's events ==
Event	Gold		Silver		Bronze	
500 meters × 2	(South Korea) Kim Hyun-yung	77.83	(Japan) Arisa Tsujimoto	78.52	(Russia) Aleksandra Kachurkina	78.71
1000 metres	(Russia) Aleksandra Kachurkina	1:19.10	(South Korea) Kim Hyun-yung	1:19.19	(Kazakhstan) Yekaterina Aydova	1:19.53
1500 metres	(Russia) Aleksandra Kachurkina	2:06.20	(Japan) Nana Takahashi	2:06.35	(Kazakhstan) Yekaterina Aydova	2:06.58
3000 metres	(Belarus) Maryna Zuyeva	4:18.26	(Japan) Nana Takahashi	4:27.68	(Russia) Elena Sokhryakova	4:27.89
5000 metres	(Belarus) Maryna Zuyeva	7:20.11	(Japan) Nana Takahashi	7:35.14	(South Korea) Lim Jung-soo	7:49.09
Mass start	(Russia) Anna Pristalova	68 pts	(Japan) Nene Sakai	40 pts	(South Korea) Jun Ye-jin	21 pts
Team pursuit	South Korea (KOR); Jun Ye-jin; Lim Jung-soo; Park Cho-won		Russia (RUS); Olesya Chernega; Elena Sokhryakova; Anastasiia Zdravkova; Anastasiia Zueva		Japan (JPN); Nene Sakai; Nana Takahashi; Mai Yamada	
