= Pavel Kharitonov =

Russian snowboarder

Pavel Kharitonov (born 25 July 1989 in Moscow) is a Russian snowboarder. He has competed at the 2014 Winter Olympics in Sochi.
