= Denis Moiseychenkov =

Russian bobsledder (born 1986)

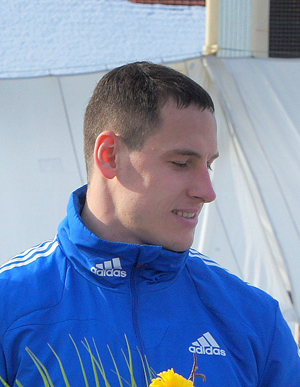
Denis Moiseychenkov

Denis Moiseychenkov (born 21 May 1986) is a Russian bobsledder who has competed since 2007. His best World Cup finish was third in a four-man event at Altenberg, Germany in December 2009.

Moiseychenkov finished eighth in the four-man event at the 2010 Winter Olympics in Vancouver.
