= Hiroaki Yamakage =

Japanese speed skater (born 1974)

Personal information
- Nationality: Japanese
- Born: 30 October 1974 (age 51) Hokkaido, Japan

Sport
- Sport: Speed skating

Hiroaki Yamakage (山影 博明, Yamakage Hiroaki; born 30 October 1974) is a Japanese speed skater. He competed in the men's 500 metres event at the 1998 Winter Olympics.
