= Yevgeny Seryayev =

Russian speed skater

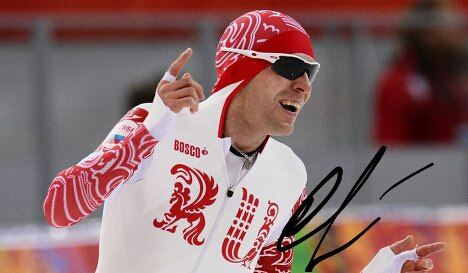

Personal information
- Born: December 11, 1988 (age 37) Moscow, Russian SSR
- Height: 6 ft 0 in (183 cm)
- Weight: 176 lb (80 kg)

Sport
- Country: Russia
- Sport: Speed skating

Achievements and titles
- Highest world ranking: 15 (mass start)

Yevgeny Seryayev (born December 11, 1988) is a Russian speed-skater.

Seryayev competed at the 2014 Winter Olympics for Russia. He competed in the 10000 metres, finishing 9th.

Seryayev made his World Cup debut in November 2013. As of September 2014, his best World Cup finish is 8th, in a 5000m race at Inzell in 2013–14. His best overall finish in the World Cup is 15th, in the 2013–14 mass start.
