= Alexey Zaitsev =

Russian bobsledder

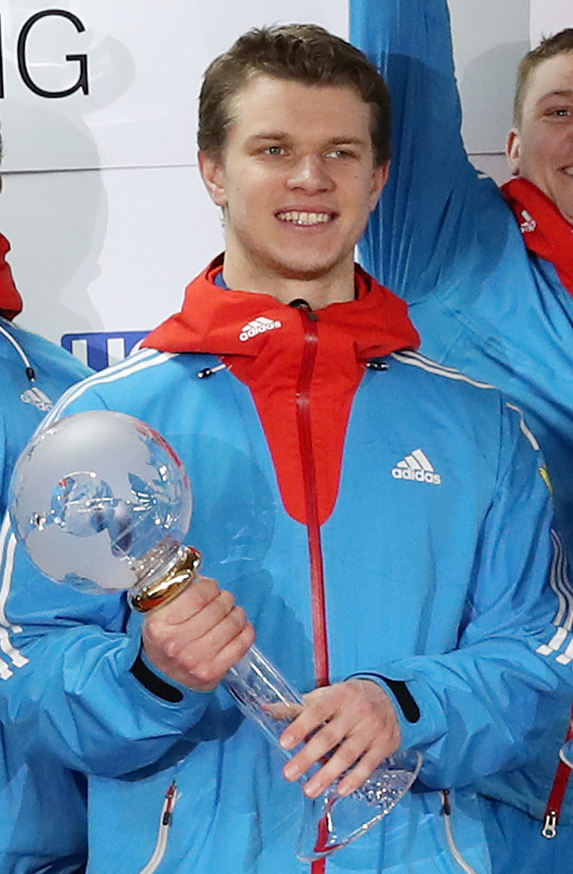
- Zaitsev in 2017

Personal information
- Nationality: Russian
- Born: 17 September 1993 (age 33)
- Spouse: Aliya Mustafina (m. 2016; div. 2018)

Sport
- Sport: Bobsleigh

Alexey Zaitsev (born 17 September 1993) is a Russian bobsledder. He competed in the four-man event at the 2018 Winter Olympics.

== Personal life ==
Zaitsev began dating Russian gymnast Aliya Mustafina in the fall of 2015 after meeting at a hospital where both were recovering from sports injuries. They married on 3 November 2016 in his hometown of Krasnodar.

In January 2017, it was announced that Aliya was pregnant and that the baby was due in July. Mustafina gave birth to a girl named Alisa (Алиса) Mustafina-Zaytseva on 9 June 2017. On 29 April 2018, Mustafina announced that they had divorced one month earlier.
