= Kirill Antyukh =

Russian bobsledder, brakeman

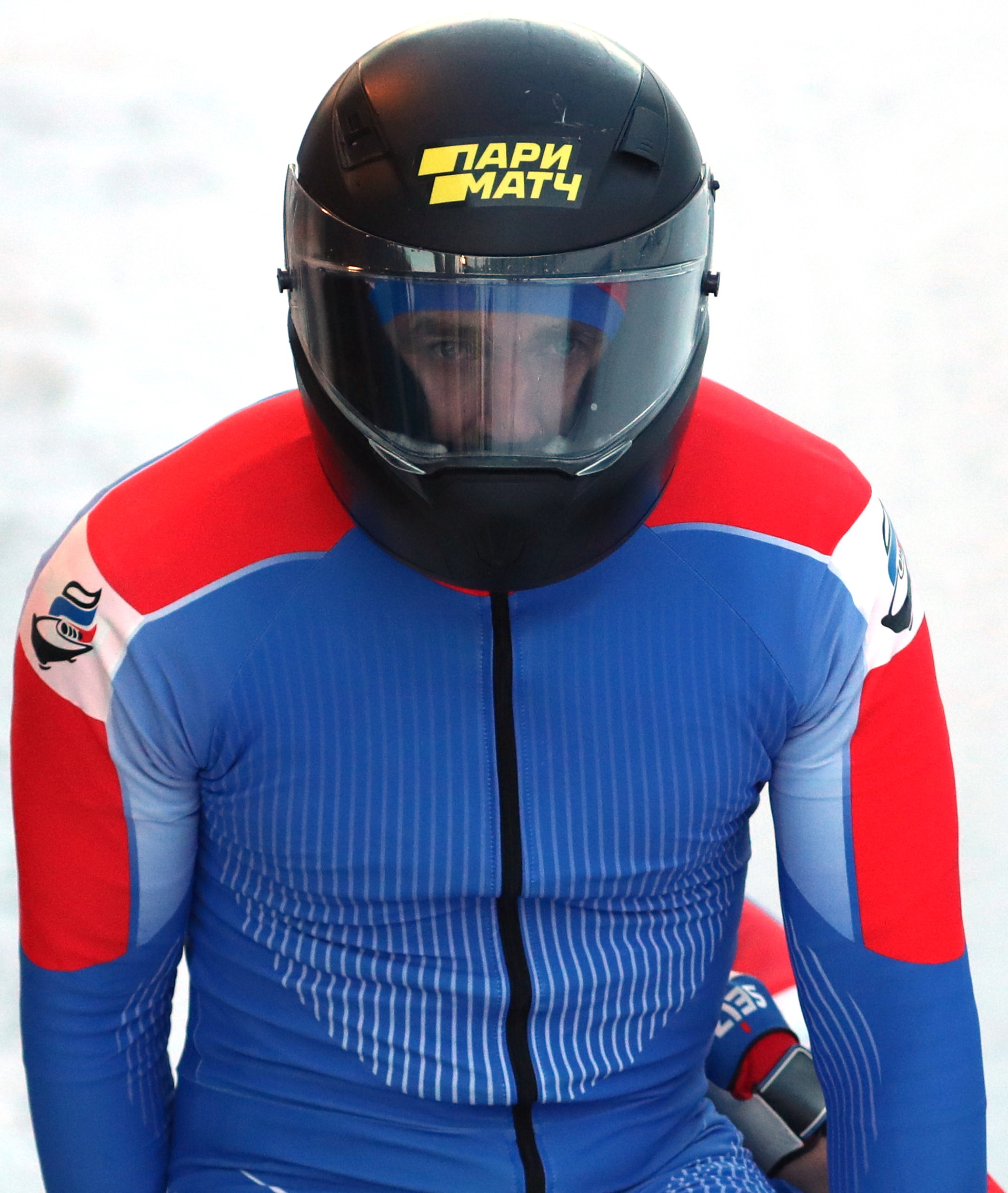
- Antyukh in 2021

Personal information
- Born: 6 May 1986 (age 40) Saint Petersburg, Russia
- Height: 187 cm (6 ft 2 in)
- Weight: 89 kg (196 lb)

Sport
- Sport: Bobsleigh
- Coached by: M. Yu. Mikhailova

Kirill Nikolaevich Antyukh (Russian: Кирилл Николаевич Антюх, born 6 May 1986) is a Russian bobsledder. Competing in two-man and four-man events he won a bronze medal at the 2013 World Cup and was part of the Russian team at the 2014 Winter Olympics. At the world championships his best result was eighth place in 2017

Between 2002 and 2010 Antyukh competed in sprint running, following his elder sister Natalya Antyukh. He is married and has a daughter.
