= Petr Moiseev =

Russian bobsledder

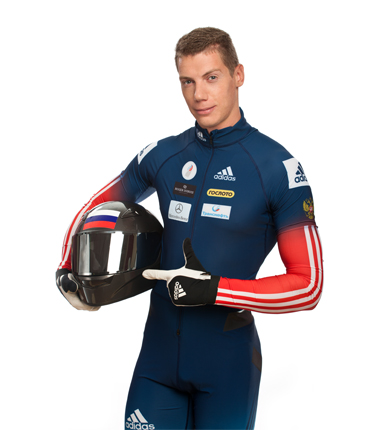
Petr Moiseev

Petr Aleksandrovich Moiseev (Russian: Пётр Александрович Моисеев; born 7 March 1986 in Podolsk) is a Russian bobsledder who has competed since 2006. His best World Cup finish was third place twice in the four-man event during the 2008–09 season.

Moiseev also finished ninth in the four-man event at the FIBT World Championships 2008 in Altenberg, Germany.

He crashed out during the four-man event at the 2010 Winter Olympics in Vancouver.
