= Austria at the 2014 Winter Olympics =

- IOC code: AUT
- NOC: Austrian Olympic Committee
- Website: www.olympia.at (in German)

in Sochi
- Competitors: 130 in 14 sports
- Flag bearers: Mario Stecher (opening); Julia Dujmovits (closing)
- Medals Ranked 9th: Gold 4 Silver 9 Bronze 4 Total 17

Winter Olympics appearances (overview)
- 1924; 1928; 1932; 1936; 1948; 1952; 1956; 1960; 1964; 1968; 1972; 1976; 1980; 1984; 1988; 1992; 1994; 1998; 2002; 2006; 2010; 2014; 2018; 2022; 2026

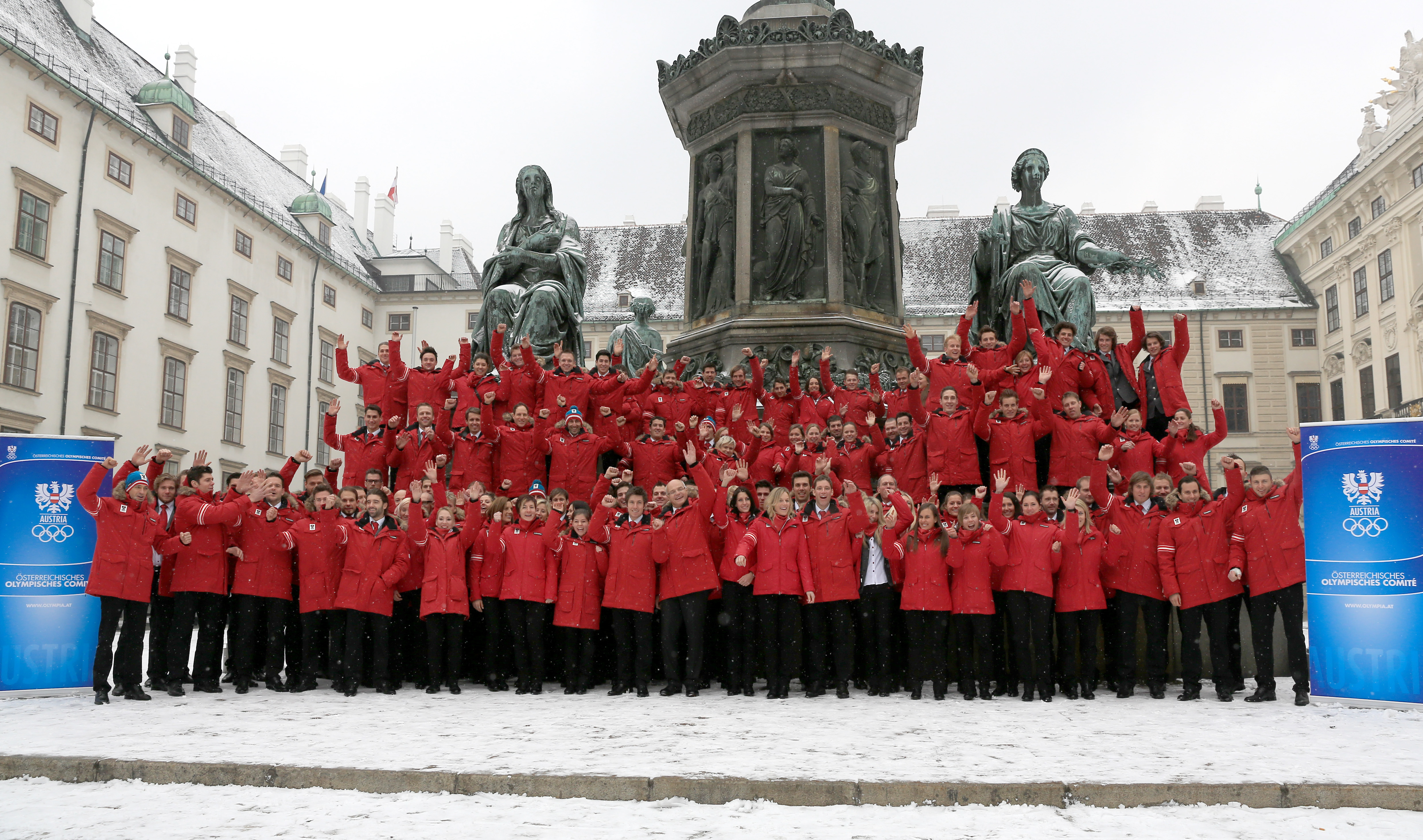
The Austrian athletes for the 2014 Winter Olympics

Austria competed at the 2014 Winter Olympics in Sochi, Russia, from 7 to 23 February 2014. The team was composed of 132 athletes in 14 sports, consisting of 90 men and 42 women. The 132 athletes is 27 more than the country's previous largest Winter Olympics team.

Originally Benjamin Raich was scheduled to carry the flag at the opening ceremony, however he withdrew after he decided to skip the combined competition, thus delaying his arrival in Sochi. Nordic combined athlete Mario Stecher was named his replacement.

The Austrian Olympic Committee received a Russian letter containing a kidnap threat against Alpine skier Bernadette Schild and skeleton pilot Janine Flock during the Sochi Games.

On 23 February, skier Johannes Dürr was suspended from the Winter Olympics after testing positive for EPO.

In 2025 the men's biathlon relay was retrospectively awarded the silver medal after the winning Russian quartett was suspended due to doping.

== Medalists ==
Medals by sport
Sport	1st place, gold medalist(s)	2nd place, silver medalist(s)	3rd place, bronze medalist(s)	Total
Alpine skiing	3	4	2	9
Snowboarding	1	0	1	2
Ski jumping	0	2	0	2
Biathlon	0	2	0	2
Luge	0	1	0	1
Nordic combined	0	0	1	1
Total	4	9	4	17

Medals by date
Day	Date	1st place, gold medalist(s)	2nd place, silver medalist(s)	3rd place, bronze medalist(s)	Total
Day 1	8 February	0	1	0	1
Day 2	9 February	1	0	0	1
Day 3	10 February	0	1	0	1
Day 4	11 February	0	1	0	1
Day 5	12 February	0	1	0	1
Day 8	15 February	1	0	1	2
Day 10	17 February	0	1	0	1
Day 11	18 February	0	1	0	1
Day 13	20 February	0	0	1	1
Day 14	21 February	0	1	1	2
Day 15	22 February	2	2	1	5
Total		4	9	4	17

Medal	Name	Sport	Event	Date
Gold	Matthias Mayer	Alpine skiing	Men's downhill	9 February
Gold	Anna Fenninger	Alpine skiing	Women's super-G	15 February
Gold	Julia Dujmovits	Snowboarding	Women's parallel slalom	22 February
Gold	Mario Matt	Alpine skiing	Men's slalom	22 February
Silver	Dominik Landertinger	Biathlon	Men's sprint	8 February
Silver	Nicole Hosp	Alpine skiing	Women's combined	10 February
Silver	Daniela Iraschko-Stolz	Ski jumping	Women's normal hill individual	11 February
Silver	Andreas Linger; Wolfgang Linger	Luge	Doubles	12 February
Silver	Thomas Diethart; Michael Hayböck; Thomas Morgenstern; Gregor Schlierenzauer	Ski jumping	Team large hill	17 February
Silver	Anna Fenninger	Alpine skiing	Women's giant slalom	18 February
Silver	Marlies Schild	Alpine skiing	Women's slalom	21 February
Silver	Marcel Hirscher	Alpine skiing	Men's slalom	22 February
Silver	Christoph Sumann; Daniel Mesotitsch; Simon Eder; Dominik Landertinger	Biathlon	Men's relay	22 February
Bronze	Nicole Hosp	Alpine skiing	Women's super-G	15 February
Bronze	Christoph Bieler; Bernhard Gruber; Lukas Klapfer; Mario Stecher	Nordic combined	Team large hill/4 x 5 km	20 February
Bronze	Kathrin Zettel	Alpine skiing	Women's slalom	21 February
Bronze	Benjamin Karl	Snowboarding	Men's parallel slalom	22 February

== Alpine skiing ==
According to the quota allocation released on 24 January 2014, Austria qualified a total quota of twenty-two athletes in alpine skiing. Joachim Puchner and Nicole Schmidhofer were selected to the team but did not compete in any races.

Men

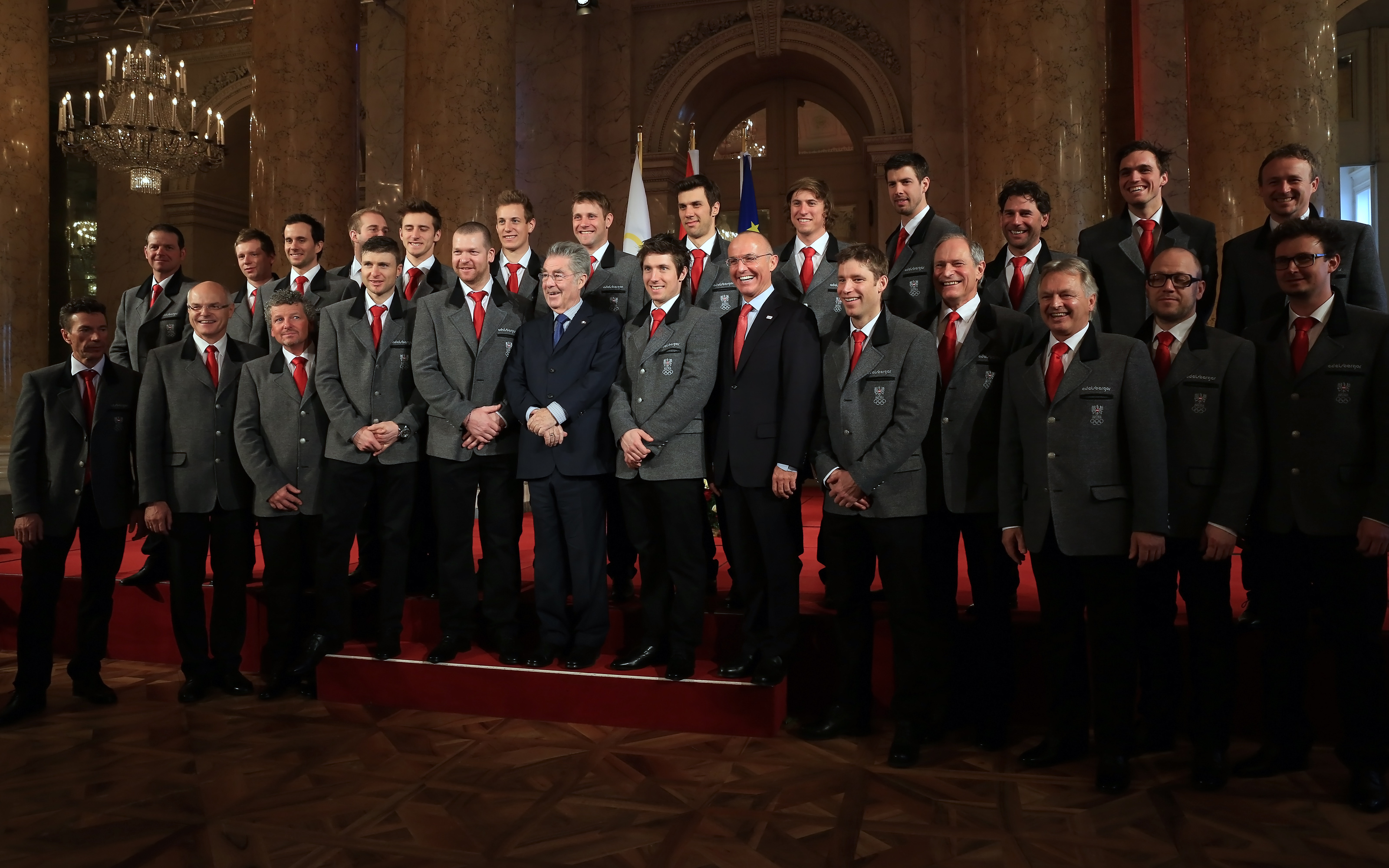
The Austrian men's alpine skiing team

Athlete	Event	Run 1		Run 2		Total	
Athlete	Event	Time	Rank	Time	Rank	Time	Rank
Romed Baumann	Combined	1:55.36	21	52.23	9	2:47.59	14
Max Franz	Combined	1:53.93	5	DNF			
Max Franz	Downhill	—N/a				2:07.03	9
Max Franz	Super-G	—N/a				1:18.74	6
Reinfried Herbst	Slalom	DNF					
Marcel Hirscher	Giant slalom	1:22.47	7	1:23.76	5	2:46.23	4
Marcel Hirscher	Slalom	47.98	9	54.14	2	1:42.12	2nd place, silver medalist(s)
Klaus Kröll	Downhill	—N/a				2:08.50	22
Mario Matt	Slalom	46.70	1	55.14	6	1:41.84	1st place, gold medalist(s)
Matthias Mayer	Downhill	—N/a				2:06.23	1st place, gold medalist(s)
Matthias Mayer	Super-G	—N/a				DNF	
Matthias Mayer	Combined	1:53.61	3	53.85	20	2:47.46	13
Matthias Mayer	Giant slalom	1:22.41	=4	1:23.93	9	2:46.34	6
Benjamin Raich	Giant slalom	1:22.67	13	1:23.68	4	2:46.35	7
Benjamin Raich	Slalom	DNF					
Philipp Schörghofer	Giant slalom	1:22.83	15	1:24.63	20	2:47.46	18
Georg Streitberger	Downhill	—N/a				2:07.86	17
Georg Streitberger	Super-G	—N/a				1:19.77	21
Otmar Striedinger	Super-G	—N/a				1:18.69	5
Otmar Striedinger	Combined	1:55.48	22	54.98	21	2:50.46	21

Women

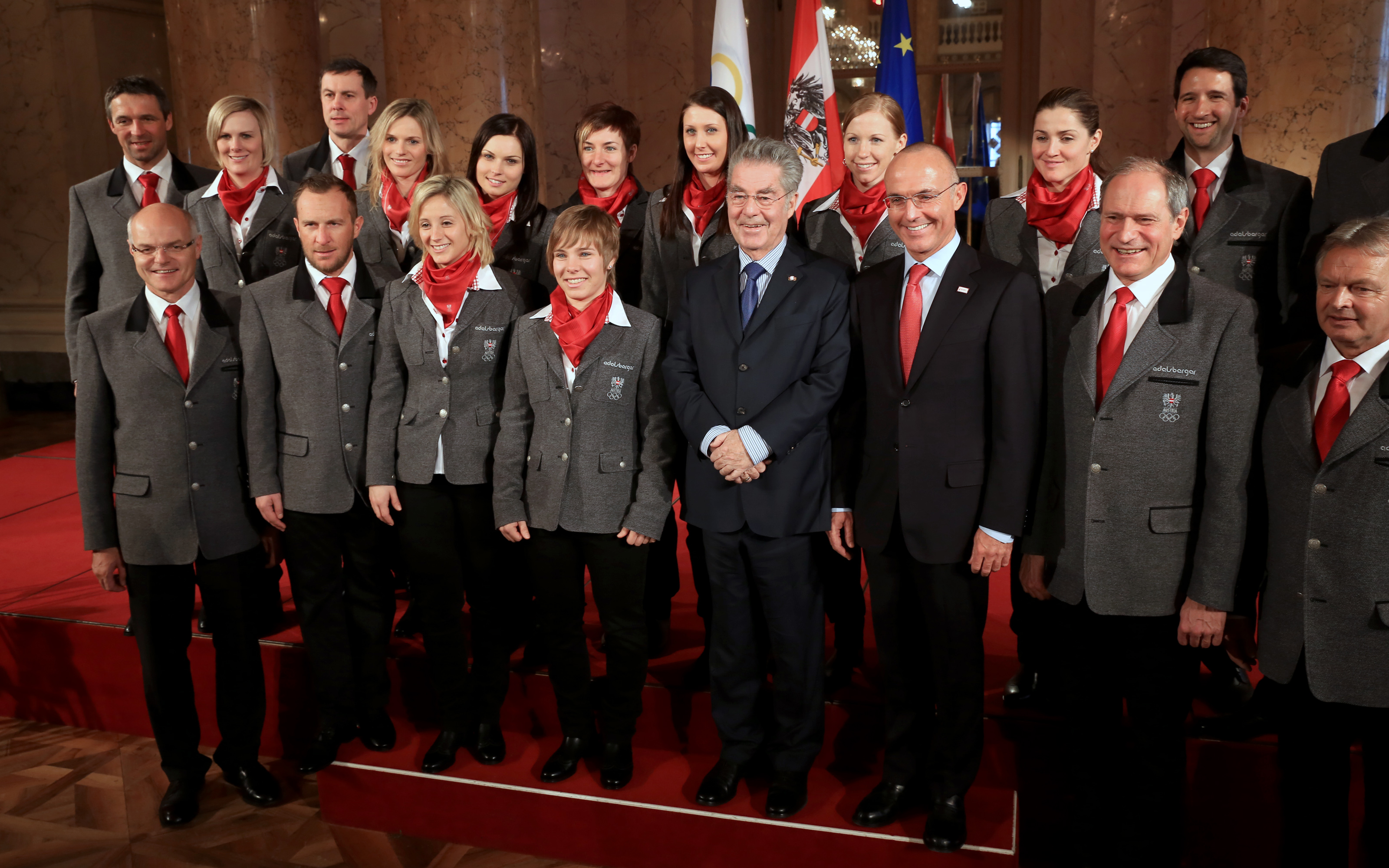
The Austrian women's alpine skiing team

Athlete	Event	Run 1		Run 2		Total	
Athlete	Event	Time	Rank	Time	Rank	Time	Rank
Anna Fenninger	Downhill	—N/a				DNF	
Anna Fenninger	Super-G	—N/a				1:25.52	1st place, gold medalist(s)
Anna Fenninger	Combined	1:43.67	4	52.77	14	2:36.44	8
Anna Fenninger	Giant slalom	1:18.73	4	1:18.21	3	2:36.94	2nd place, silver medalist(s)
Elisabeth Görgl	Downhill	—N/a				1:42.82	16
Elisabeth Görgl	Super-G	—N/a				DNF	
Elisabeth Görgl	Combined	1:43.89	7	DNF			
Elisabeth Görgl	Giant slalom	1:19.84	10	1:19.80	22	2:39.64	11
Nicole Hosp	Downhill	—N/a				1:42.62	9
Nicole Hosp	Super-G	—N/a				1:26.18	3rd place, bronze medalist(s)
Nicole Hosp	Combined	1:43.95	8	51.07	4	2:35.02	2nd place, silver medalist(s)
Cornelia Hütter	Downhill	—N/a				1:43.82	24
Michaela Kirchgasser	Combined	1:45.72	23	50.69	2	2:36.41	7
Michaela Kirchgasser	Giant slalom	1:20.39	13	1:19.42	=15	2:39.81	12
Michaela Kirchgasser	Slalom	54.06	9	DNF			
Bernadette Schild	Slalom	53.41	4	DNF			
Marlies Schild	Slalom	53.96	6	51.11	1	1:45.07	2nd place, silver medalist(s)
Regina Sterz	Super-G	—N/a				1:27.52	=11
Kathrin Zettel	Giant slalom	1:21.60	25	1:18.73	8	2:40.33	19
Kathrin Zettel	Slalom	54.00	7	51.35	2	1:45.35	3rd place, bronze medalist(s)

== Biathlon ==
Based on their performance at the 2012 and 2013 Biathlon World Championships, Austria qualified 6 men and 4 women.

Men

Athlete	Event	Time	Misses	Rank
Simon Eder	Sprint	24:47.2	0 (0+0)	7
Simon Eder	Pursuit	34:28.9	2 (1+0+0+1)	8
Simon Eder	Individual	50:09.5	1 (0+1+0+0)	4
Simon Eder	Mass start	44:30.7	4 (1+1+1+1)	16
Dominik Landertinger	Sprint	24:34.8	0 (0+0)	2nd place, silver medalist(s)
Dominik Landertinger	Pursuit	34:37.5	3 (0+0+1+2)	10
Dominik Landertinger	Individual	50:14.2	0 (0+0+0+0)	5
Dominik Landertinger	Mass start	43:32.8	2 (1+0+0+1)	7
Daniel Mesotitsch	Sprint	26:06.6	2 (0+2)	38
Daniel Mesotitsch	Pursuit	36:23.4	3 (1+0+1+1)	37
Daniel Mesotitsch	Individual	53:53.3	3 (2+0+1+0)	40
Christoph Sumann	Sprint	25:25.5	0 (0+0)	20
Christoph Sumann	Pursuit	34:43.0	0 (0+0+0+0)	12
Christoph Sumann	Individual	52:39.1	1 (0+1+0+0)	24
Christoph Sumann	Mass start	45:39.0	4 (1+2+1+0)	27
Simon Eder; Dominik Landertinger; Daniel Mesotitsch; Christoph Sumann	Team relay	1:12:45.7	7 (0+7)	3rd place, bronze medalist(s)

Women

Athlete	Event	Time	Misses	Rank
Lisa Hauser	Sprint	22:15.6	0 (0+0)	27
Lisa Hauser	Pursuit	33:25.0	3 (1+0+1+1)	39
Lisa Hauser	Individual	48:56.4	1 (0+0+0+1)	36
Katharina Innerhofer	Sprint	24:49.0	4 (1+3)	76
Katharina Innerhofer	Individual	48:28.3	4 (1+1+1+1)	28

Mixed

Athlete	Event	Time	Misses	Rank
Lisa Hauser; Katharina Innerhofer; Daniel Mesotitsch; Friedrich Pinter	Team relay	1:12:34.8	8 (1+7)	9

== Bobsleigh ==
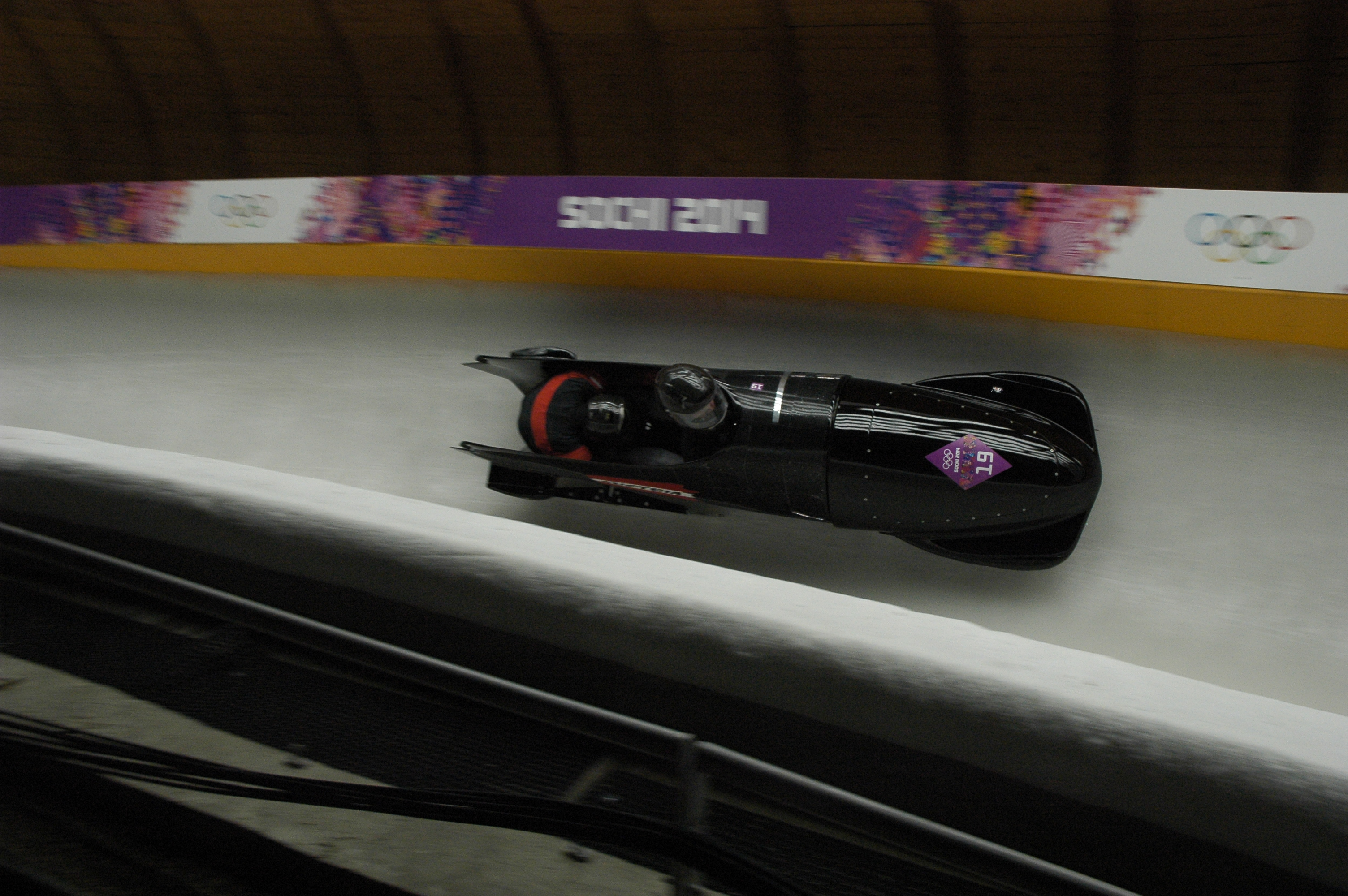
Austrian two-man bobsleigh

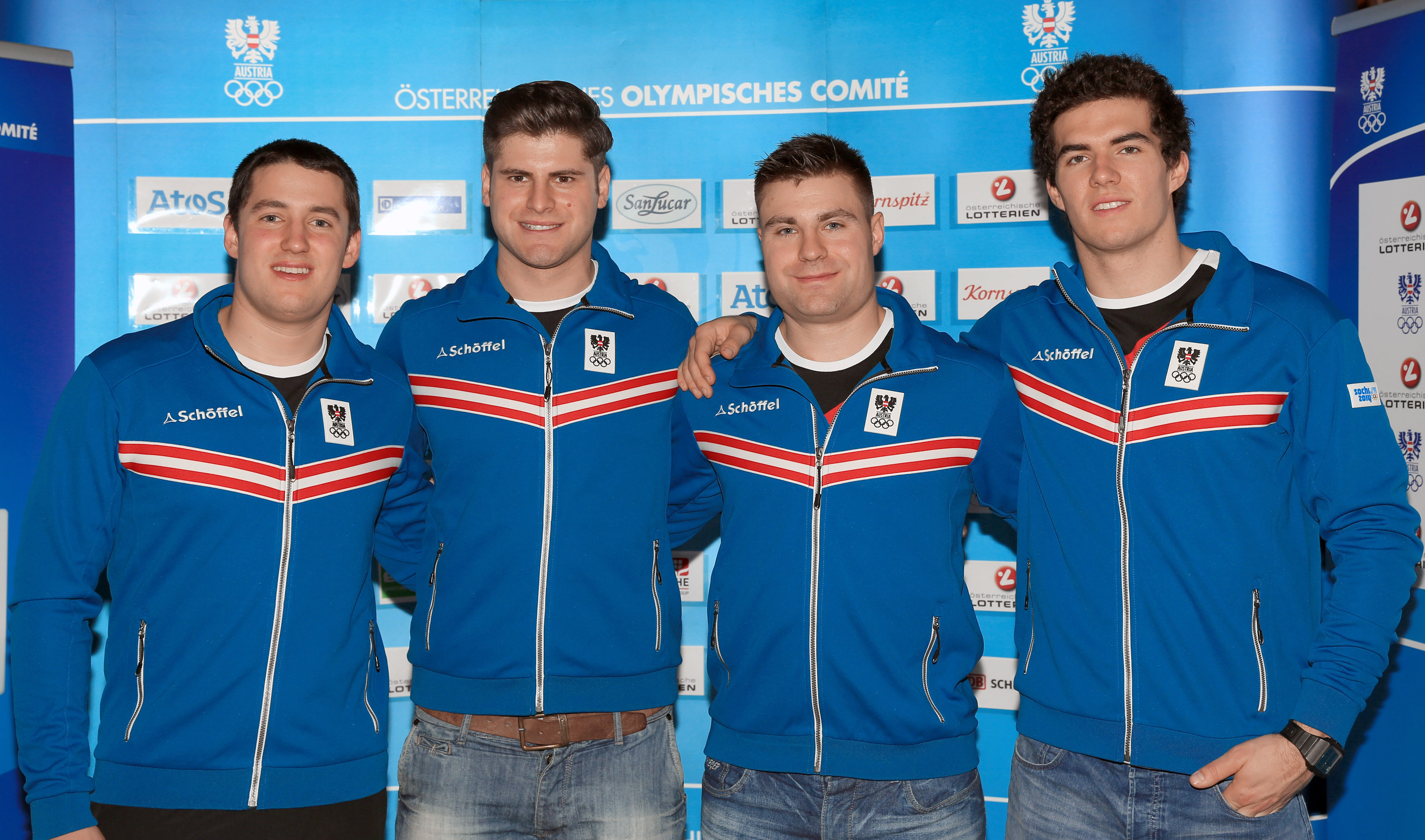
The Austrian men's bobsleigh team

Athlete	Event	Run 1		Run 2		Run 3		Run 4		Total	
Athlete	Event	Time	Rank	Time	Rank	Time	Rank	Time	Rank	Time	Rank
Benjamin Maier*; Markus Sammer	Two-man	57.57	23	57.74	22	57.41	20	Did not advance		2:52.72	22
Benjamin Maier*; Sebastian Heufler***; Markus Sammer**; Angel Somov; Stefan Withalm	Four-man	56.25	=21	56.11	19	56.27	21	Did not advance		2:48.63	19
Christina Hengster*; Viola Kleiser**; Alexandra Tüchi***	Two-woman	58.59	14	58.56	14	58.73	13	58.91	15	3:54.79	15

* – Denotes the driver of each sled
** – Competed only in runs 1 and 2
*** - Competed only in runs 3 and 4

== Cross-country skiing ==
According to the quota allocation released on 20 January 2014, Austria had eight athletes in qualification position.

Distance
Men

Athlete	Event	Classical		Freestyle		Final		
Athlete	Event	Time	Rank	Time	Rank	Time	Deficit	Rank
Johannes Dürr	30 km skiathlon	36:04.0	11	31:55.8	8	1:08:32.0	+16.6	8
Max Hauke	15 km classical	—N/a				43:23.4	+4:53.7	57
Bernhard Tritscher	50 km freestyle	—N/a				1:47:51.7	+56.5	24

Women

Athlete	Event	Classical		Freestyle		Final		
Athlete	Event	Time	Rank	Time	Rank	Time	Deficit	Rank
Veronika Mayerhofer	10 km classical	—N/a				31:59.6	+3:41.8	44
Nathalie Schwarz	10 km classical	—N/a				31:23.2	+3:05.4	35
Katerina Smutna	10 km classical	—N/a				30:13.6	+1:55.8	20
Katerina Smutna	15 km skiathlon	20:14.2	30	21:41.7	53	42:32.8	+3:59.2	46
Teresa Stadlober	15 km skiathlon	20:35.7	42	20:24.5	32	41:38.8	+3:05.2	37
Teresa Stadlober	30 km freestyle	—N/a				1:13:50.1	+2:44.9	20
Veronika Mayerhofer; Nathalie Schwarz; Katerina Smutna; Teresa Stadlober	4×5 km relay	—N/a				57:04.7	+4:02.0	13

Sprint

Athlete	Event	Qualification		Quarterfinal		Semifinal		Final	
Athlete	Event	Time	Rank	Time	Rank	Time	Rank	Time	Rank
Max Hauke	Men's sprint	3:41.55	46	Did not advance					
Bernhard Tritscher	Men's sprint	3:32.60	8 Q	3:44.01	2 Q	3:37.64	3	Did not advance	
Harald Wurm	Men's sprint	3:37.18	24 Q	3:38.32	5	Did not advance			
Max Hauke; Harald Wurm	Men's team sprint	—N/a				25:01.23	8	Did not advance	
Nathalie Schwarz	Women's sprint	2:49.54	53	Did not advance					
Katerina Smutna; Teresa Stadlober	Women's team sprint	—N/a				16:59.50	5 q	16:49.16	9

== Figure skating ==
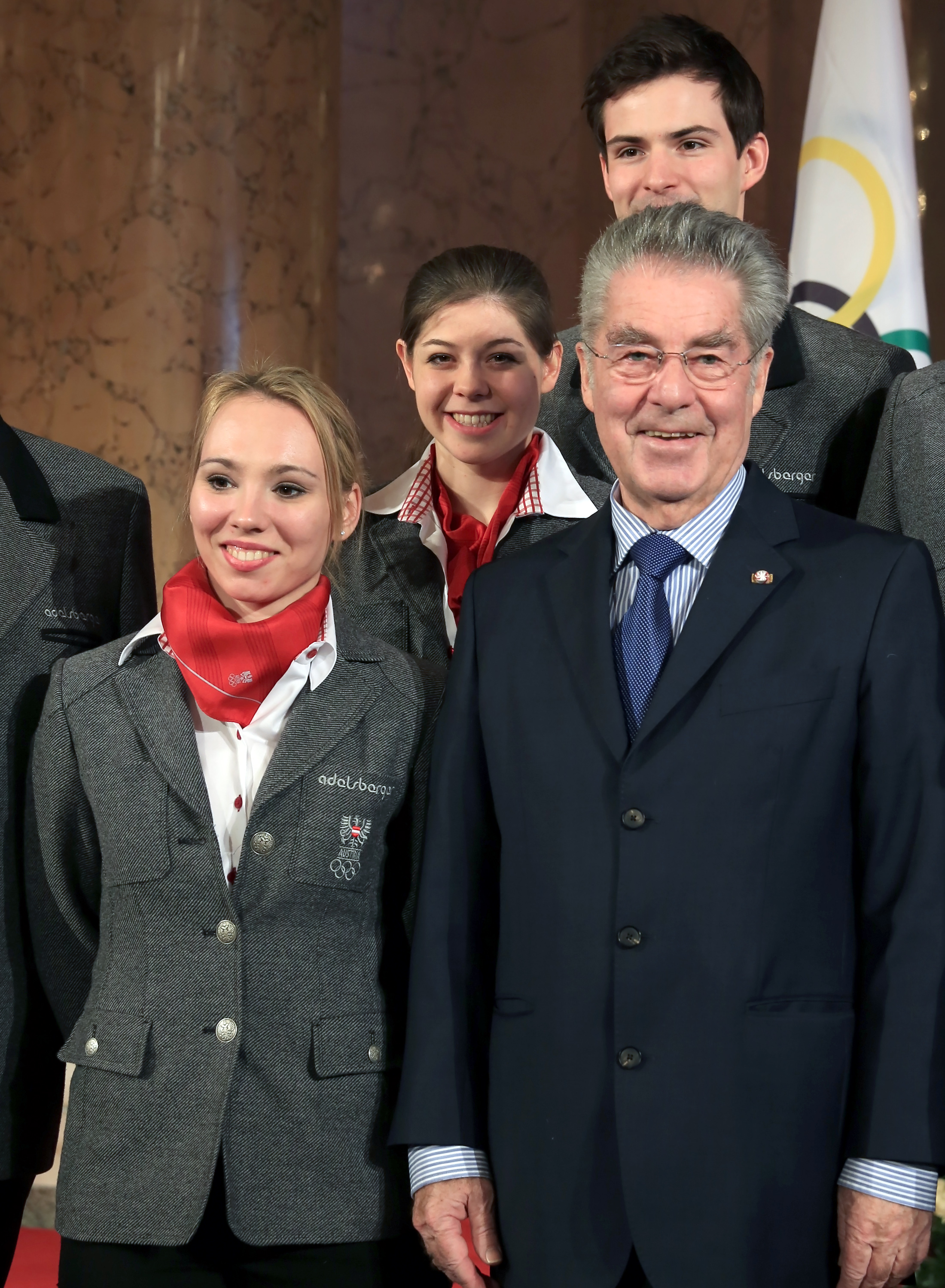
The Austrian figure skating team

Austria achieved the following quota places:

Athlete	Event	SP		FS		Total	
Athlete	Event	Points	Rank	Points	Rank	Points	Rank
Viktor Pfeifer	Men's singles	56.60	26	Did not advance			
Kerstin Frank	Ladies' singles	48.00	26	Did not advance			
Miriam Ziegler / Severin Kiefer	Pairs	49.62	17	Did not advance			

== Freestyle skiing ==
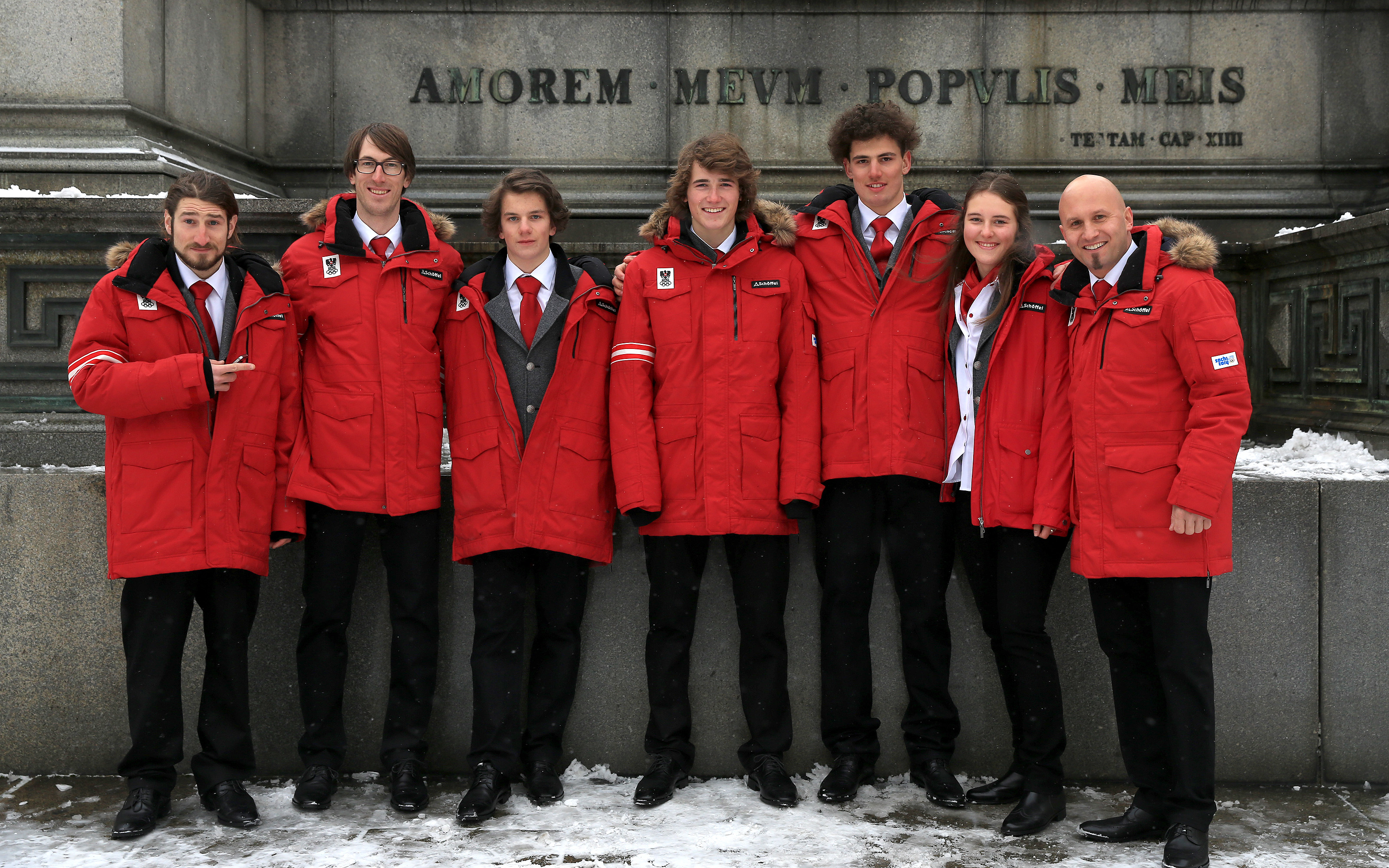
The Austrian freestyle skiing team

Halfpipe

Athlete	Event	Qualification				Final			
Athlete	Event	Run 1	Run 2	Best	Rank	Run 1	Run 2	Best	Rank
Andreas Gohl	Men's halfpipe	54.80	22.80	54.80	20	Did not advance			
Marco Ladner	Men's halfpipe	56.60	58.60	58.60	19	Did not advance			

Ski cross

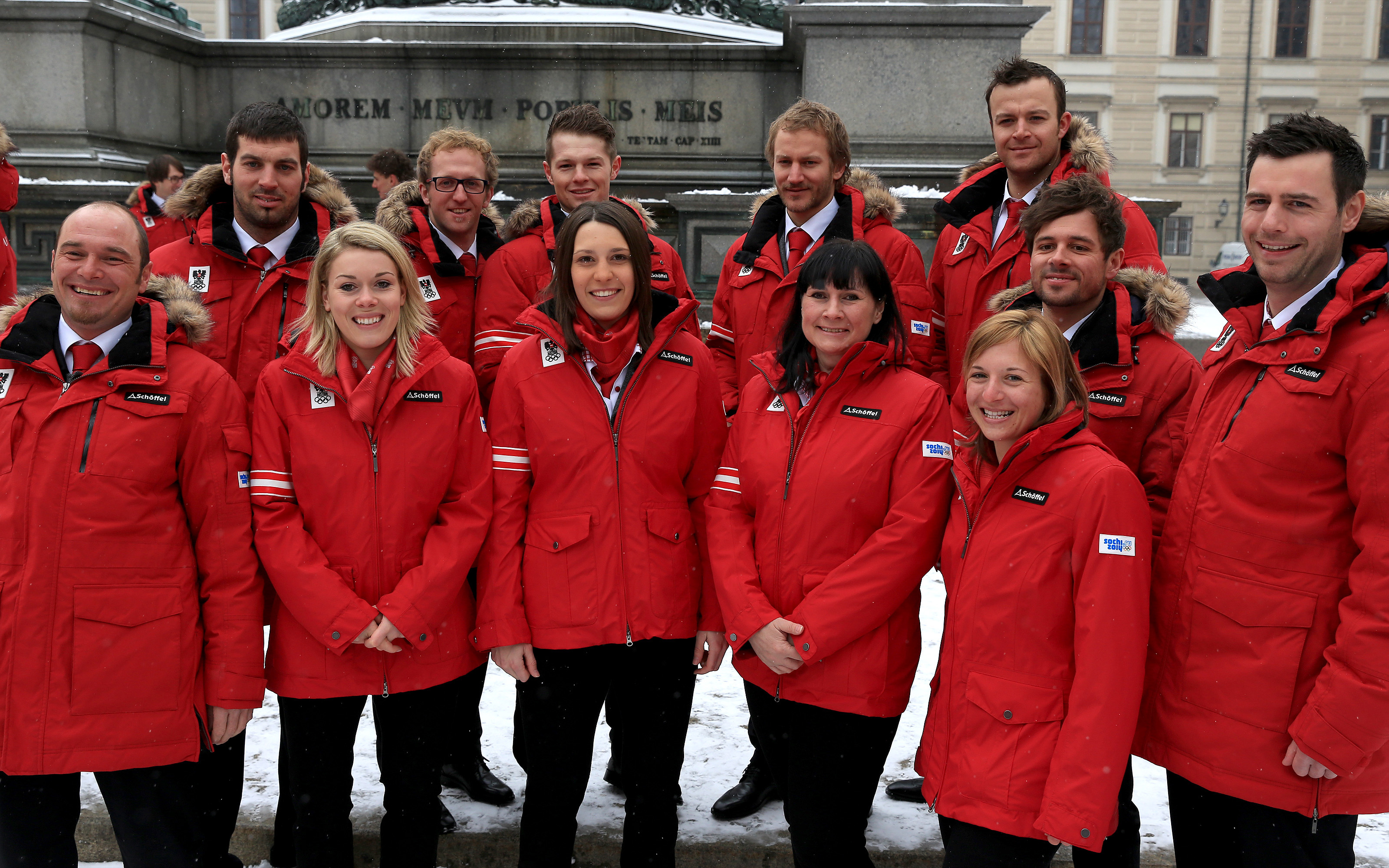
The Austrian ski cross team

Athlete	Event	Seeding		Round of 16	Quarterfinal	Semifinal	Final	
Athlete	Event	Time	Rank	Position	Position	Position	Position	Rank
Patrick Koller	Men's ski cross	1:19.12	28	3	Did not advance			24
Andreas Matt	Men's ski cross	1:17.55	12	1 Q	4	Did not advance		14
Christoph Wahrstötter	Men's ski cross	1:17.72	14	3	Did not advance			20
Thomas Zangerl	Men's ski cross	1:17.72	15	4	Did not advance			27
Andrea Limbacher	Women's ski cross	1:26.88	23	3	Did not advance			22
Katrin Ofner	Women's ski cross	1:24.10	13	2 Q	1 Q	3 FB	2	6
Christina Staudinger	Women's ski cross	1:28.30	24	3	Did not advance			23

Qualification legend: FA – Qualify to medal round; FB – Qualify to consolation round

Slopestyle

Athlete	Event	Qualification				Final			
Athlete	Event	Run 1	Run 2	Best	Rank	Run 1	Run 2	Best	Rank
Luca Tribondeau	Men's slopestyle	80.20	80.80	80.80	14	Did not advance			
Philomena Bair	Women's slopestyle	57.60	20.00	57.60	16	Did not advance			

== Ice hockey ==
Austria qualified a men's team by winning a qualification tournament.

=== Men's tournament ===
Roster

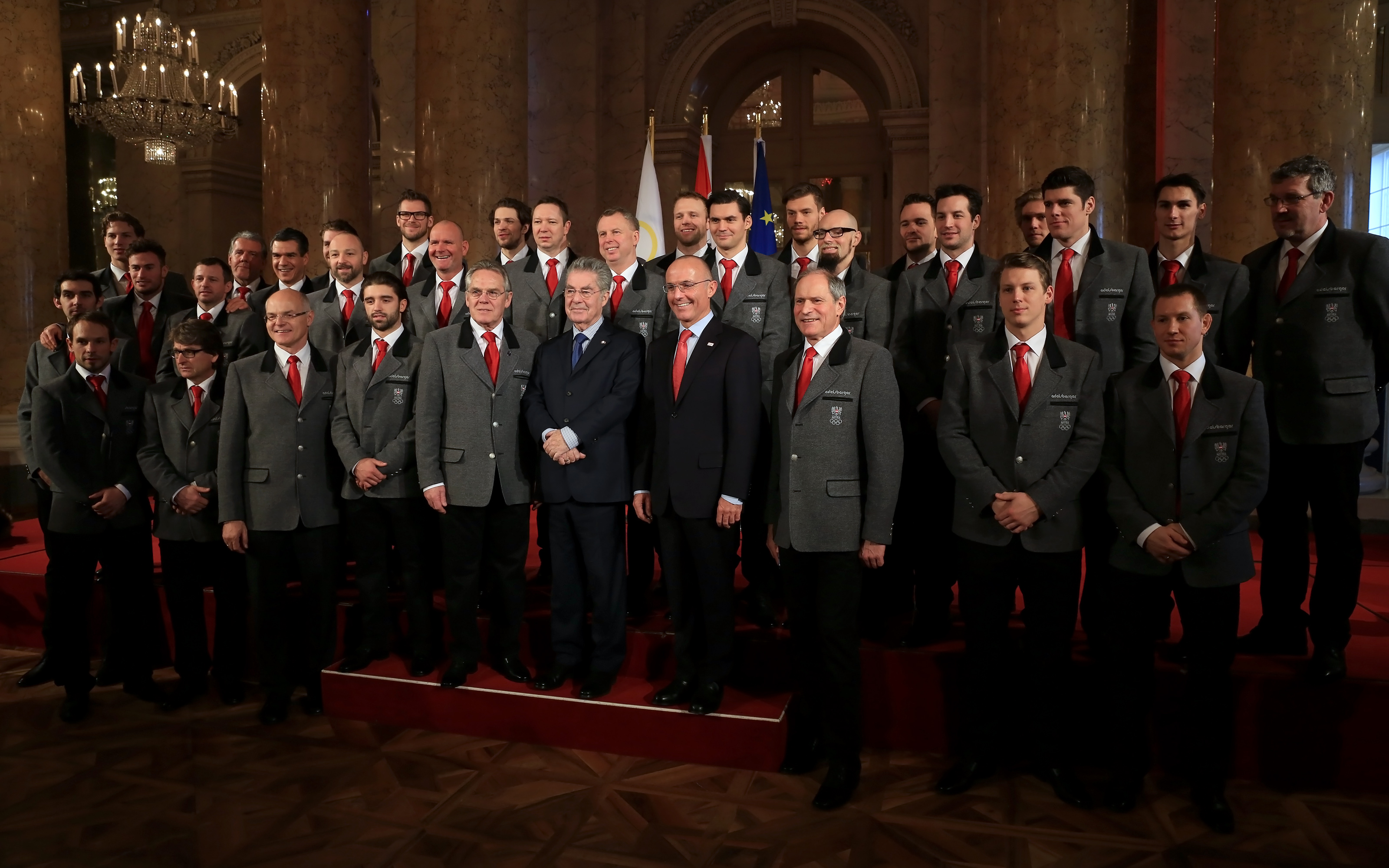
The Austrian ice hockey team

The following is the Austrian roster in the men's ice hockey tournament of the 2014 Winter Olympics.

No.	Pos.	Name	Height	Weight	Birthdate	Birthplace	2013–14 team
4	D	Gerhard Unterluggauer	177 cm (5 ft 10 in)	88 kg (194 lb)	15 August 1976	Villach	(Austria) Villacher SV (AUT)
5	F	Thomas Raffl	194 cm (6 ft 4 in)	97 kg (214 lb)	19 June 1986	Villach	(Austria) Red Bull Salzburg (AUT)
7	D	Stefan Ulmer	176 cm (5 ft 9 in)	72 kg (159 lb)	1 December 1990	Dornbirn	(Switzerland) HC Lugano (NLA)
10	F	Daniel Oberkofler	183 cm (6 ft 0 in)	74 kg (163 lb)	16 July 1988	Graz	(Austria) Black Wings Linz (AUT)
12	F	Michael Raffl	185 cm (6 ft 1 in)	87 kg (192 lb)	1 December 1988	Villach	(United States) Philadelphia Flyers (NHL)
14	F	Andreas Nödl	187 cm (6 ft 2 in)	90 kg (200 lb)	28 February 1987	Vienna	(Austria) Red Bull Salzburg (AUT)
15	F	Manuel Latusa	182 cm (6 ft 0 in)	88 kg (194 lb)	23 January 1984	Vienna	(Austria) Red Bull Salzburg (AUT)
18	F	Thomas Koch – A	173 cm (5 ft 8 in)	77 kg (170 lb)	17 August 1983	Klagenfurt	(Austria) Klagenfurter AC (AUT)
20	F	Daniel Welser	180 cm (5 ft 11 in)	86 kg (190 lb)	16 February 1983	Klagenfurt	(Austria) Red Bull Salzburg (AUT)
22	D	Thomas Pöck	186 cm (6 ft 1 in)	93 kg (205 lb)	2 December 1981	Klagenfurt	(Austria) Klagenfurter AC (AUT)
24	G	Mathias Lange	178 cm (5 ft 10 in)	82 kg (181 lb)	13 April 1985	Klagenfurt	(Germany) Iserlohn Roosters (GER)
25	F	Matthias Iberer	188 cm (6 ft 2 in)	91 kg (201 lb)	29 April 1985	Graz	(Austria) Black Wings Linz (AUT)
26	F	Thomas Vanek – C	188 cm (6 ft 2 in)	94 kg (207 lb)	19 January 1984	Baden bei Wien	(United States) New York Islanders (NHL)
27	F	Thomas Hundertpfund	189 cm (6 ft 2 in)	85 kg (187 lb)	14 December 1989	Klagenfurt	(Sweden) Timrå IK (SWE-2)
29	G	Bernhard Starkbaum	186 cm (6 ft 1 in)	89 kg (196 lb)	19 February 1986	Vienna	(Sweden) Brynäs IF (SHL)
30	G	René Swette	183 cm (6 ft 0 in)	82 kg (181 lb)	21 August 1988	Lustenau	(Austria) Klagenfurter AC (AUT)
40	F	Michael René Grabner	185 cm (6 ft 1 in)	85 kg (187 lb)	5 October 1987	Villach	(United States) New York Islanders (NHL)
41	D	Mario Altmann	194 cm (6 ft 4 in)	98 kg (216 lb)	4 November 1986	Vienna	(Austria) Villacher SV (AUT)
48	D	Florian Iberer	185 cm (6 ft 1 in)	95 kg (209 lb)	7 December 1982	Graz	(Austria) Klagenfurter AC (AUT)
51	D	Matthias Trattnig – A	185 cm (6 ft 1 in)	96 kg (212 lb)	22 April 1979	Graz	(Austria) Red Bull Salzburg (AUT)
55	D	Robert Lukas	177 cm (5 ft 10 in)	84 kg (185 lb)	29 August 1978	Vienna	(Austria) Black Wings Linz (AUT)
64	D	Andre Lakos	200 cm (6 ft 7 in)	107 kg (236 lb)	29 July 1979	Vienna	(Austria) Vienna Capitals (AUT)
77	F	Brian Lebler	191 cm (6 ft 3 in)	96 kg (212 lb)	16 July 1988	Klagenfurt	(Austria) Black Wings Linz (AUT)
89	F	Raphael Herburger	178 cm (5 ft 10 in)	72 kg (159 lb)	2 January 1989	Dornbirn	(Switzerland) EHC Biel (NLA)
91	F	Oliver Setzinger	183 cm (6 ft 0 in)	89 kg (196 lb)	11 July 1983	Horn	(Switzerland) HC Lausanne (NLA)

Group stage

Team	Pld	W	OTW	OTL	L	GF	GA	GD	Pts	Qualification
Canada	3	2	1	0	0	11	2	+9	8	Quarterfinals
Finland	3	2	0	1	0	15	7	+8	7	Quarterfinals
Austria	3	1	0	0	2	7	15	−8	3	
Norway	3	0	0	0	3	3	12	−9	0	

Source: IIHF

13 February 2014; 12:00	Finland	8–4 (4–2, 2–0, 2–2)	Austria	Bolshoy Ice Dome, Sochi; Attendance: 5,664

Game reference

Tuukka Rask
Goalies
Bernhard Starkbaum
Referees:
(Germany) Daniel Piechaczek
(United States) Ian Walsh
Linesmen:
(United States) Tommy George
(Canada) Brad Kovachik

	0–1	0:36 – M. Grabner (M. Raffl)
M. Granlund (T. Selänne, S. Vatanen) – 5:15	1–1
	1–2	9:19 – T. Hundertpfund (T. Vanek, O. Setzinger)
S. Lepistö (J. Jokinen, T. Ruutu) – 11:23	2–2
O. Määttä (O. Jokinen) – 19:25	3–2
J. Immonen (J. Lehterä, O. Väänänen) – 19:33	4–2
J. Jokinen (P. Kontiola) – 21:43	5–2
P. Kontiola (M. Granlund) – 32:10	6–2
	6–3	41:29 – M. Grabner (M. Raffl, B. Lebler)
J. Immonen (A. Barkov, S. Vatanen) (PP) – 51:25	7–3
	7–4	54:22 – M. Grabner (M. Trattnig, B. Lebler)
M. Granlund (K. Timonen, S. Vatanen) (PP) – 58:25	8–4

4 min
Penalties
10 min
52
Shots
20

14 February 2014; 21:00	Canada	6–0 (2–0, 4–0, 0–0)	Austria	Bolshoy Ice Dome, Sochi; Attendance: 8,969

Game reference

Roberto Luongo
Goalies
Bernhard Starkbaum (out 40:00)
Mathias Lange (in 40:00)
Referees:
(Canada) Dave Jackson
(Russia) Konstantin Olenin
Linesmen:
(Canada) Lonnie Cameron
(Slovakia) Miroslav Valach

D. Doughty (J. Toews) – 5:24	1–0
S. Weber (C. Perry, R. Getzlaf) – 10:12	2–0
J. Carter (P. Marleau, S. Crosby) – 22:39	3–0
J. Carter (P. Marleau, A. Pietrangelo) – 24:09	4–0
J. Carter (P. Marleau, S. Weber) – 34:33	5–0
R. Getzlaf (SH) – 36:48	6–0

8 min
Penalties
2 min
46
Shots
23

16 February 2014; 12:00	Austria	3–1 (2–0, 0–1, 1–0)	Norway	Bolshoy Ice Dome, Sochi; Attendance: 6,882

Game reference

Mathias Lange
Goalies
Lars Haugen
Referees:
(Czech Republic) Vladimír Šindler
(United States) Ian Walsh
Linesmen:
(Canada) Lonnie Cameron
(Germany) André Schrader

M. Grabner (T. Pöck, R. Lukas) – 4:27	1–0
M. Raffl (M. Grabner) (PP) – 6:52	2–0
	2–1	28:05 – P. Skrøder (P. Thoresen)
M. Grabner (D. Welser) – 58:23	3–1

12 min
Penalties
8 min
27
Shots
35

Qualification playoffs

18 February 2014; 12:00	Slovenia	4–0 (2–0, 1–0, 1–0)	Austria	Bolshoy Ice Dome, Sochi; Attendance: 6,821

Game reference

Robert Kristan
Goalies
Mathias Lange
Referees:
(Canada) Dave Jackson
(Czech Republic) Vladimír Šindler
Linesmen:
(United States) Tommy George
(United States) Chris Woodworth

A. Kopitar (R. Tičar, Ž. Jeglič) (PP) – 5:29	1–0
J. Urbas (S. Kovačević) (SH) – 11:57	2–0
S. Kovačević (D. Rodman, J. Muršak) – 23:21	3–0
J. Muršak (D. Rodman) (EN) – 57:02	4–0

6 min
Penalties
10 min
35
Shots
30

Austria finished the tournament on the 10th rank.

== Luge ==
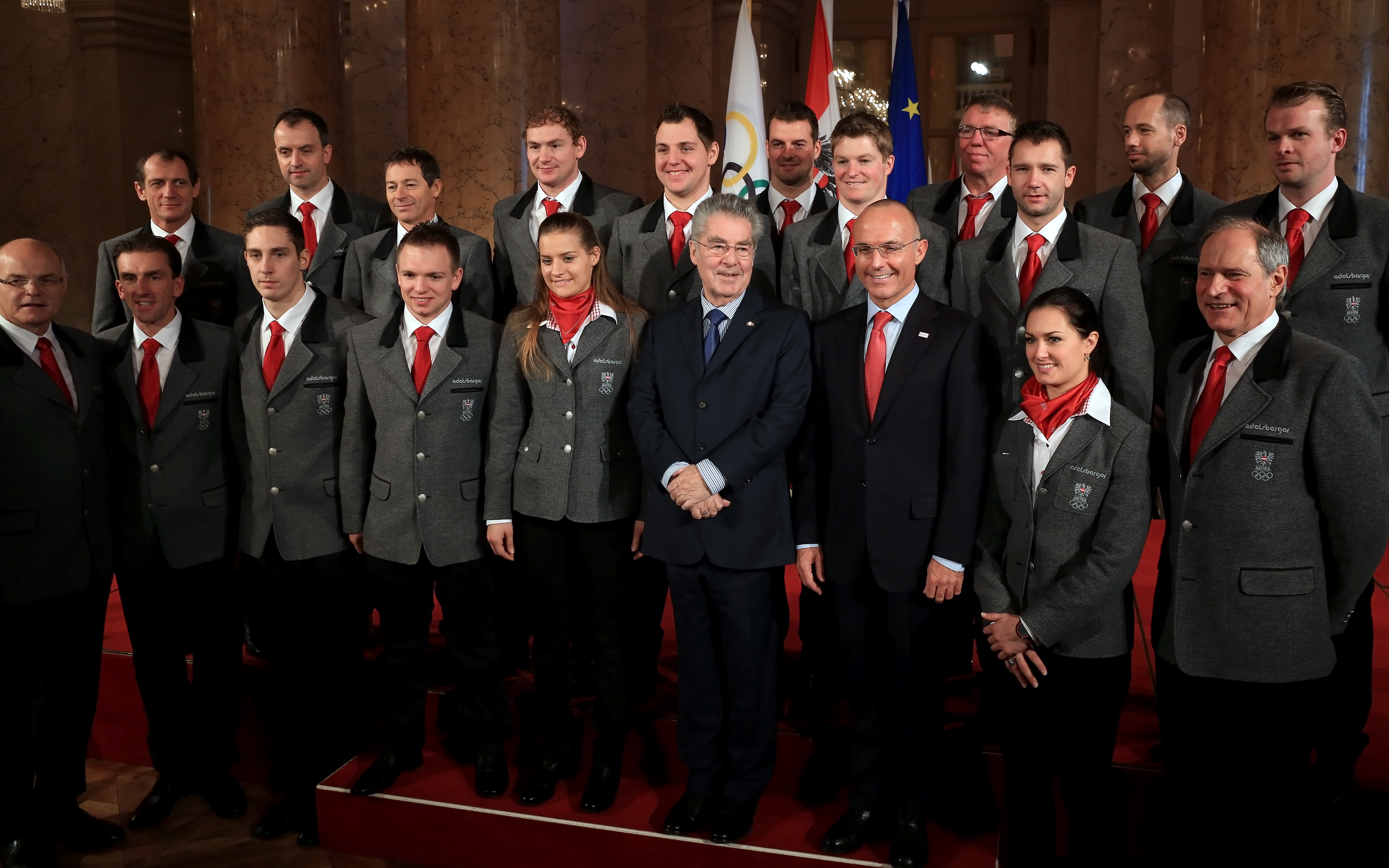
The Austrian luge team

Austria earned the maximum quota of ten spots.

Men

Athlete	Event	Run 1		Run 2		Run 3		Run 4		Total	
Athlete	Event	Time	Rank	Time	Rank	Time	Rank	Time	Rank	Time	Rank
Reinhard Egger	Singles	52.564	4	52.630	11	52.152	9	52.160	6	3:29.506	8
Wolfgang Kindl	Singles	52.586	5	52.714	13	52.145	8	52.218	12	3:29.663	9
Daniel Pfister	Singles	52.925	16	52.802	14	52.306	13	52.243	13	3:30.276	15
Georg Fischler; Peter Penz	Doubles	49.793	3	54.252	19	—N/a				1:44.045	19
Andreas Linger; Wolfgang Linger	Doubles	49.685	2	49.770	2	—N/a				1:39.455	2nd place, silver medalist(s)

Women

Athlete	Event	Run 1		Run 2		Run 3		Run 4		Total	
Athlete	Event	Time	Rank	Time	Rank	Time	Rank	Time	Rank	Time	Rank
Miriam Kastlunger	Singles	51.622	24	50.795	13	51.139	18	51.109	16	3:24.665	17
Birgit Platzer	Singles	51.201	17	51.518	25	51.760	24	52.097	28	3:26.576	23
Nina Reithmayer	Singles	51.225	20	51.143	20	51.614	22	51.174	17	3:25.156	20

Mixed team relay

Athlete	Event	Run 1		Run 2		Run 3		Total	
Athlete	Event	Time	Rank	Time	Rank	Time	Rank	Time	Rank
Miriam Kastlunger; Wolfgang Kindl; Andreas Linger; Wolfgang Linger	Team relay	55.596	8	56.434	7	56.447	2	2:48.477	7

== Nordic combined ==
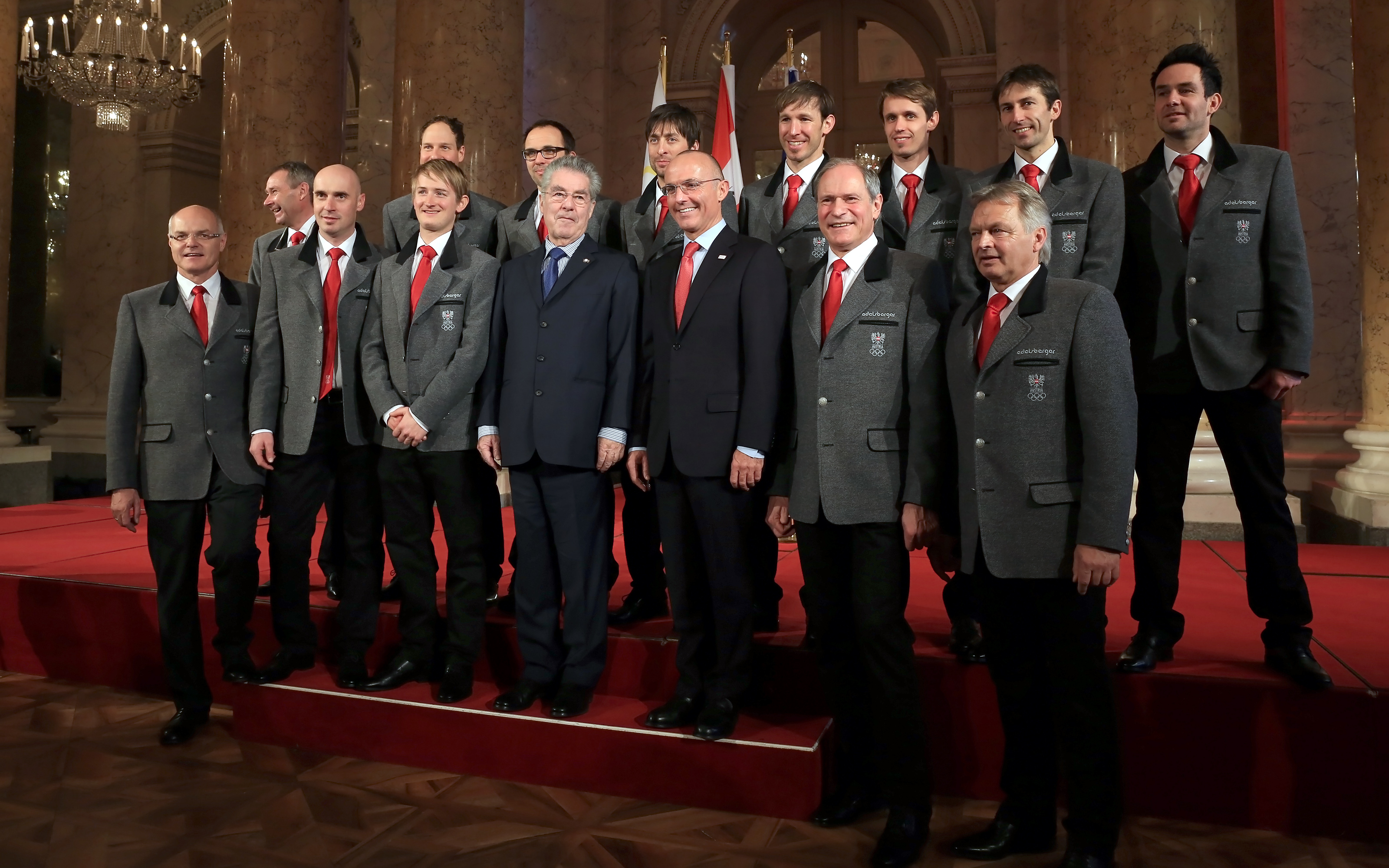
The Austrian Nordic combined team

According to the quota allocation released on 20 January 2014, Austria qualified a maximum quota of five athletes and a spot in the team large hill relay.

Athlete	Event	Ski jumping			Cross-country		Total	
Athlete	Event	Distance	Points	Rank	Time	Rank	Time	Rank
Christoph Bieler	Normal hill/10 km	98.5	121.9	11	23:52.4	13	24:20.4	11
Christoph Bieler	Large hill/10 km	125.5	106.4	17	23:03.9	17	24:33.9	17
Wilhelm Denifl	Normal hill/10 km	97.0	117.6	16	24:10.4	24	25:06.4	19
Bernhard Gruber	Large hill/10 km	136.5	123.4	3	23:16.8	24	23:38.8	5
Lukas Klapfer	Normal hill/10 km	99.0	124.0	5	24:24.5	26	24:54.7	19
Lukas Klapfer	Large hill/10 km	127.5	109.9	13	23:03.7	16	24:19.7	15
Mario Stecher	Normal hill/10 km	95.5	114.6	23	23:54.8	16	25:02.8	18
Mario Stecher	Large hill/10 km	124.5	104.0	23	23:04.1	18	24:44.1	19
Christoph Bieler; Bernhard Gruber; Lukas Klapfer; Mario Stecher	Team large hill/4×5 km	513.5	476.3	2	47:09.9	2	47:16.9	3rd place, bronze medalist(s)

== Short track speed skating ==
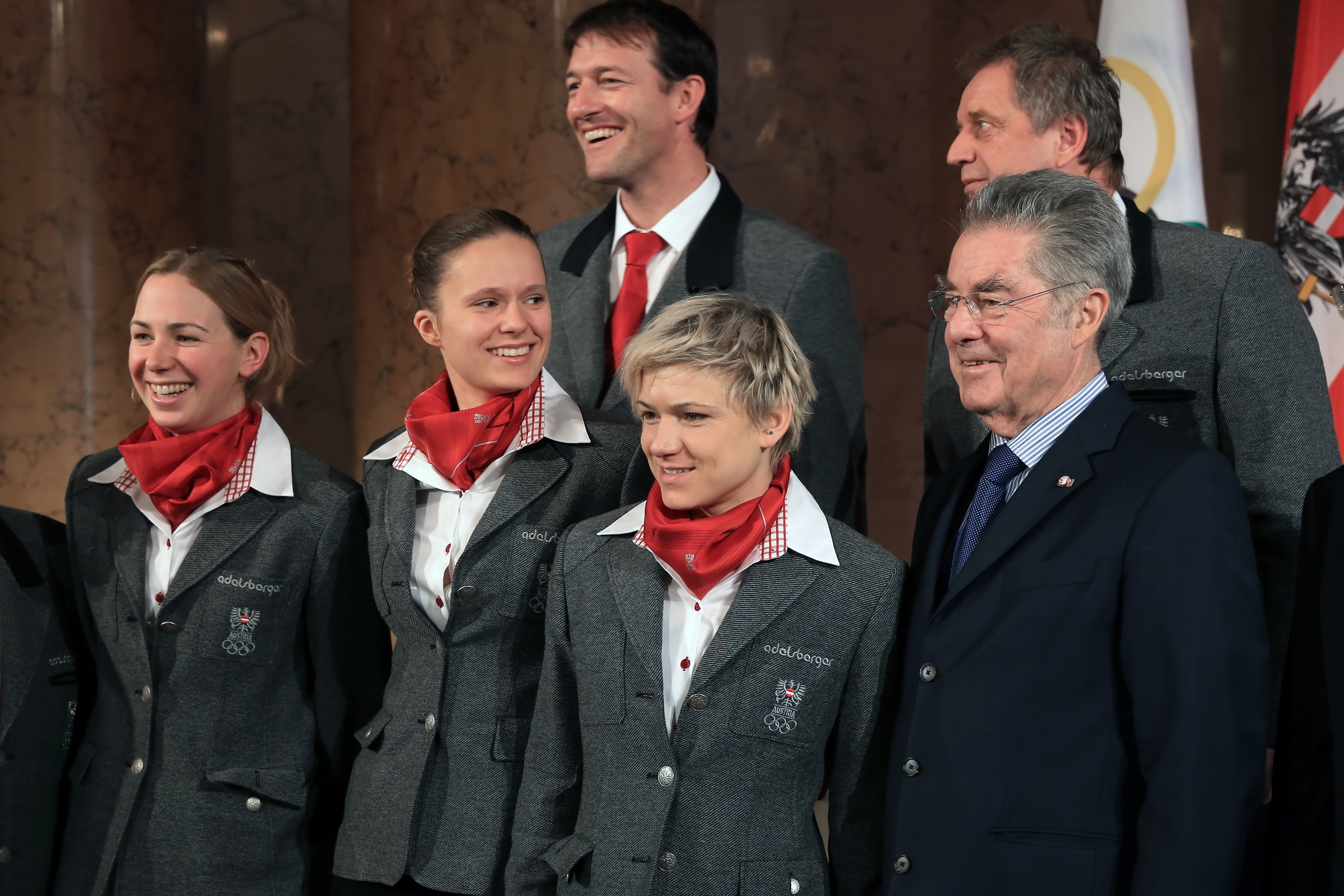
The Austrian short track speed skating team

Based on their performance at World Cup 3 and 4 in November 2013, Austria qualified 1 woman.

Athlete	Event	Heat		Quarterfinal		Semifinal		Final	
Athlete	Event	Time	Rank	Time	Rank	Time	Rank	Time	Rank
Veronika Windisch	500 m	44.586	3	Did not advance					21
Veronika Windisch	1000 m	1:36.018	2 Q	1:30.017	5	Did not advance			15
Veronika Windisch	1500 m	2:23.042	3 Q	—N/a		2:23.241	4 FB	2:26.296	11

Qualification legend: ADV – Advanced due to being impeded by another skater; FA – Qualify to medal round; FB – Qualify to consolation round

== Skeleton ==
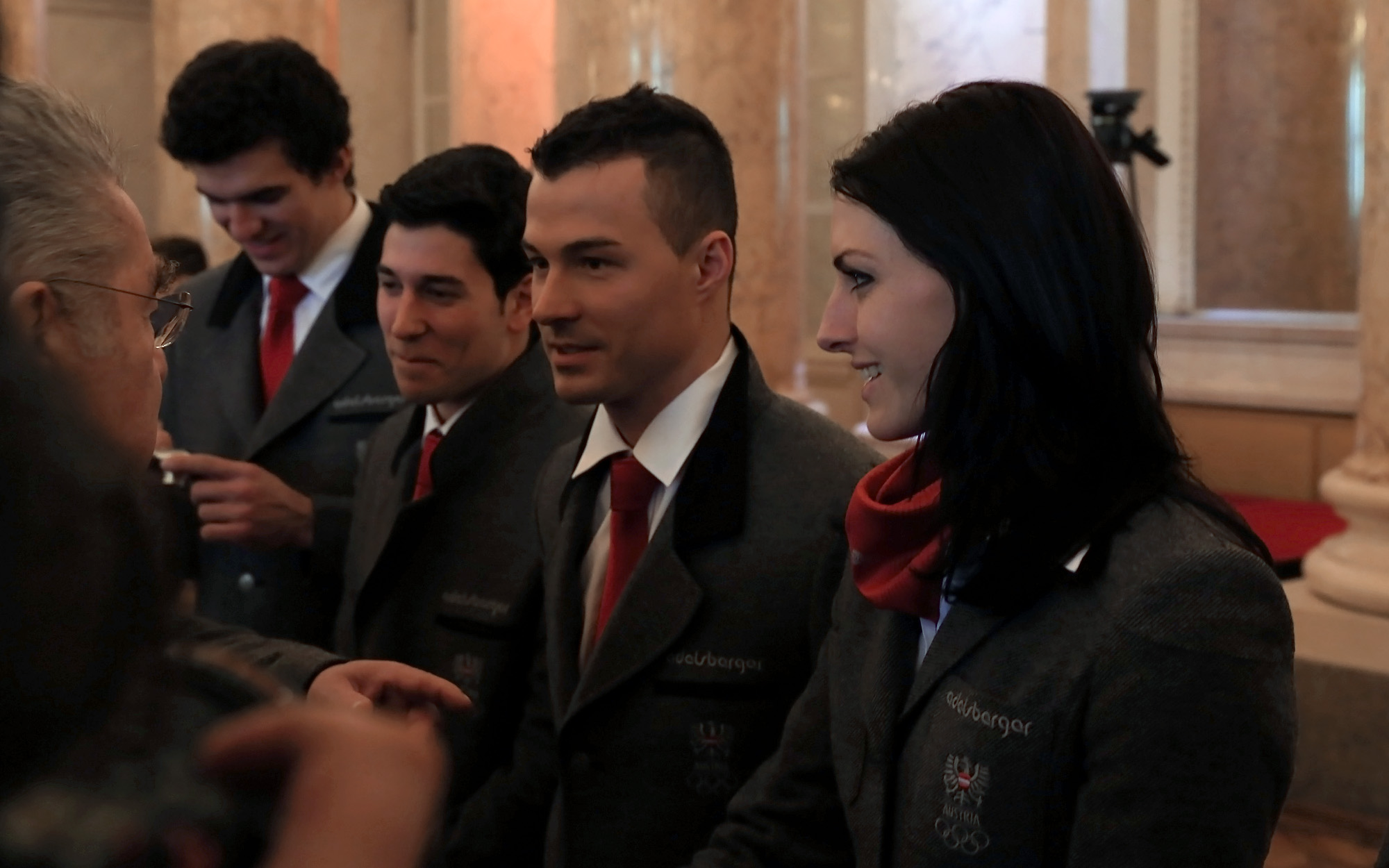
The Austrian skeleton team

Athlete	Event	Run 1		Run 2		Run 3		Run 4		Total	
Athlete	Event	Time	Rank	Time	Rank	Time	Rank	Time	Rank	Time	Rank
Matthias Guggenberger	Men's	57.70	17	57.12	14	57.24	13	56.94	9	3:49.00	14
Raphael Maier	Men's	57.83	18	57.51	18	57.95	22	57.57	17	3:50.86	19
Janine Flock	Women's	59.47	13	59.39	13	58.61	8	58.56	14	3:56.03	9

== Ski jumping ==
Austria received the following start quotas:

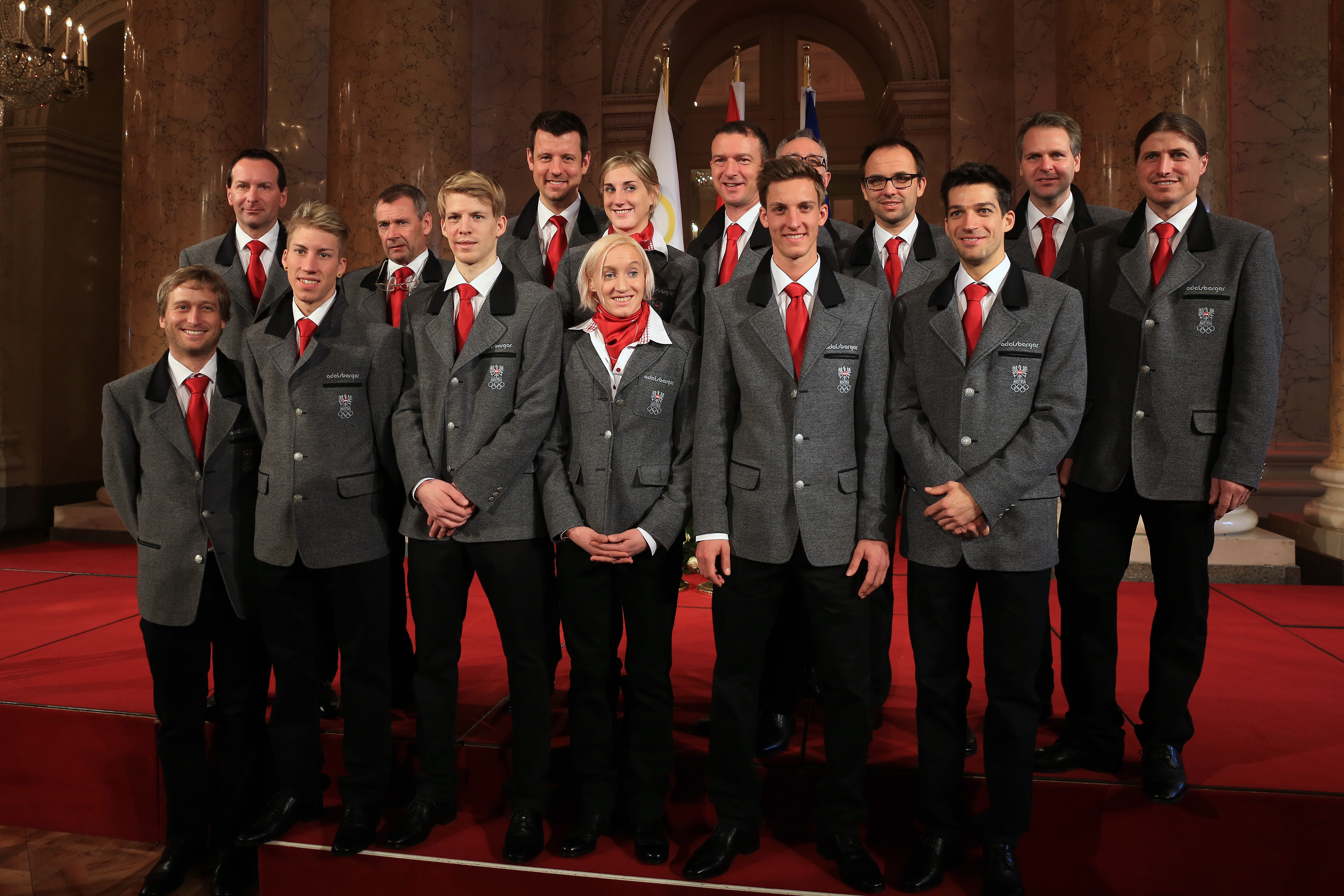
The Austrian ski jumping team

Men

Athlete	Event	Qualification			First round			Final			Total	
Athlete	Event	Distance	Points	Rank	Distance	Points	Rank	Distance	Points	Rank	Points	Rank
Thomas Diethart	Normal hill	BYE			99.0	132.6	5 Q	98.0	125.7	9	258.3	4
Thomas Diethart	Large hill	BYE			126.5	109.1	32	Did not advance				
Michael Hayböck	Normal hill	101.0	128.6	1 Q	101.0	133.4	4 Q	98.5	124.6	11	258.0	5
Michael Hayböck	Large hill	131.0	124.8	1 Q	134.0	127.3	9 Q	125.5	127.4	9	254.7	8
Thomas Morgenstern	Normal hill	99.5	118.3	9 Q	97.5	125.6	15 Q	101.0	126.0	8	251.6	14
Thomas Morgenstern	Large hill	128.0	116.0	6 Q	122.0	106.3	40	Did not advance				
Gregor Schlierenzauer	Normal hill	BYE			96.0	123.9	18 Q	101.0	129.7	4	253.6	10
Gregor Schlierenzauer	Large hill	BYE			132.5	124.6	14 Q	130.5	130.6	7	255.2	7
Thomas Diethart; Michael Hayböck; Thomas Morgenstern; Gregor Schlierenzauer	Team large hill	—N/a			527.5	516.5	2 Q	528.0	521.9	3	1038.4	2nd place, silver medalist(s)

Women

Athlete	Event	First round			Final			Total	
Athlete	Event	Distance	Points	Rank	Distance	Points	Rank	Points	Rank
Chiara Hölzl	Normal hill	92.0	102.5	25	96.0	104.6	23	207.1	25
Daniela Iraschko-Stolz	Normal hill	98.5	120.2	5	104.5	126.0	1	246.2	2nd place, silver medalist(s)

== Snowboarding ==
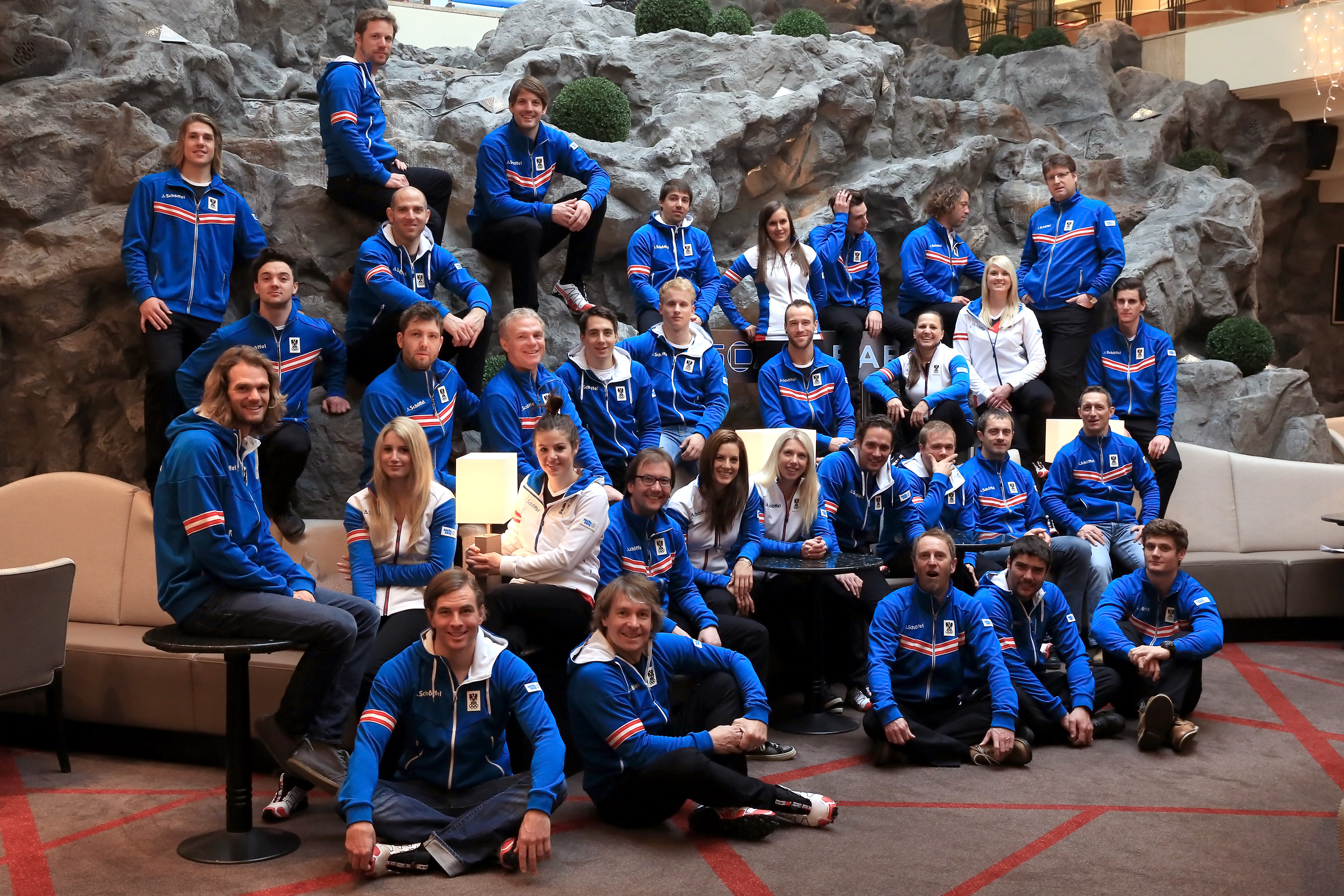
The Austrian snowboard team

Alpine
Men

Athlete	Event	Qualification		Round of 16	Quarterfinal	Semifinal	Final	
Athlete	Event	Time	Rank	Opposition Time	Opposition Time	Opposition Time	Opposition Time	Rank
Benjamin Karl	Giant slalom	1:37.44	5 Q	Galmarini (SUI); L +0.10	Did not advance			
Benjamin Karl	Slalom	58.95	4 Q	Prommegger (AUT); W −0.19	Bussler (GER); W −0.15	Wild (RUS); L +0.04	March (ITA); W −16.25	3rd place, bronze medalist(s)
Lukas Mathies	Giant slalom	DSQ		Did not advance				
Lukas Mathies	Slalom	58.93	3 Q	Baumeister (GER); W −0.45	March (ITA); L +0.29	Did not advance		
Andreas Prommegger	Giant slalom	1:39.76	16 Q	Sobolev (RUS); W −1.61	Košir (SLO); L +0.53	Did not advance		
Andreas Prommegger	Slalom	59.58	13 Q	Karl (AUT); L +0.19	Did not advance			
Anton Unterkofler	Giant slalom	1:41.04	22	Did not advance				
Anton Unterkofler	Slalom	59.80	17	Did not advance				

Women

Athlete	Event	Qualification		Round of 16	Quarterfinal	Semifinal	Final	
Athlete	Event	Time	Rank	Opposition Time	Opposition Time	Opposition Time	Opposition Time	Rank
Julia Dujmovits	Giant slalom	DSQ		Did not advance				
Julia Dujmovits	Slalom	1:04.33	5 Q	Zavarzina (RUS); W −0.24	Zogg (SUI); W DSQ	Boccacini (ITA); W −5.18	Karstens (GER); W −0.12	1st place, gold medalist(s)
Marion Kreiner	Giant slalom	1:52.40	20	Did not advance				
Marion Kreiner	Slalom	1:03.58	1 Q	Tudegesheva (RUS); W −6.04	Boccacini (ITA); L +0.05	Did not advance		
Ina Meschik	Giant slalom	1:51.32	13 Q	Sauerbreij (NED); W −0.05	Leeson (CAN); W −0.30	Takeuchi (JPN); L DSQ	Zavarzina (RUS); L +0.82	4
Ina Meschik	Slalom	1:05.15	11 Q	Laböck (GER); W −0.24	Kober (GER); L +0.01	Did not advance		
Claudia Riegler	Giant slalom	1:48.62	7 Q	Ledecká (CZE); L +0.49	Did not advance			
Claudia Riegler	Slalom	1:05.14	9 Q	Boccacini (ITA); L +2.78	Did not advance			

Freestyle

Athlete	Event	Qualification				Semifinal				Final			
Athlete	Event	Run 1	Run 2	Best	Rank	Run 1	Run 2	Best	Rank	Run 1	Run 2	Best	Rank
Adrian Krainer	Men's slopestyle	24.25	16.00	24.25	14 QS	DNS				Did not advance			
Clemens Schattschneider	Men's slopestyle	90.00	24.25	90.00	6 QS	29.50	26.25	29.50	17	Did not advance			
Mathias Weißenbacher	Men's slopestyle	18.00	28.75	28.75	14 QS	14.00	28.50	28.50	18	Did not advance			
Anna Gasser	Women's slopestyle	89.50	95.50	95.50	1 QF	BYE				49.00	51.75	51.75	10

Qualification Legend: QF – Qualify directly to final; QS – Qualify to semifinal

Snowboard cross

Athlete	Event	Seeding		Round of 16	Quarterfinal	Semifinal	Final	
Athlete	Event	Time	Rank	Position	Position	Position	Position	Rank
Hanno Douschan	Men's snowboard cross	CAN		2 Q	3 Q	DSQ FB	4	10
Alessandro Hämmerle	Men's snowboard cross	CAN		2 Q	5	Did not advance		=17
Markus Schairer	Men's snowboard cross	CAN		DNF	Did not advance			=33
Susanne Moll	Women's snowboard cross	1:25.43	21	—N/a	3 Q	DSQ FB	DNS	12
Maria Ramberger	Women's snowboard cross	1:24.55	14	—N/a	5	Did not advance		19

Qualification legend: FA – Qualify to medal round; FB – Qualify to consolation round

== Speed skating ==
Based on the results from the fall World Cups during the 2013–14 ISU Speed Skating World Cup season, Austria earned the following start quotas:

Women

Athlete	Event	Race 1		Race 2		Final	
Athlete	Event	Time	Rank	Time	Rank	Time	Rank
Vanessa Bittner	500 m	39.33	30	39.17	27	78.50	27
Vanessa Bittner	1000 m	—N/a				1:17.937	24
Vanessa Bittner	1500 m	—N/a				2:02.84	34
Anna Rokita	3000 m	—N/a				4:16.43	22
