= IBSF World Championships 2021 – Four-man =

Four-man at the IBSF World Championships 2021
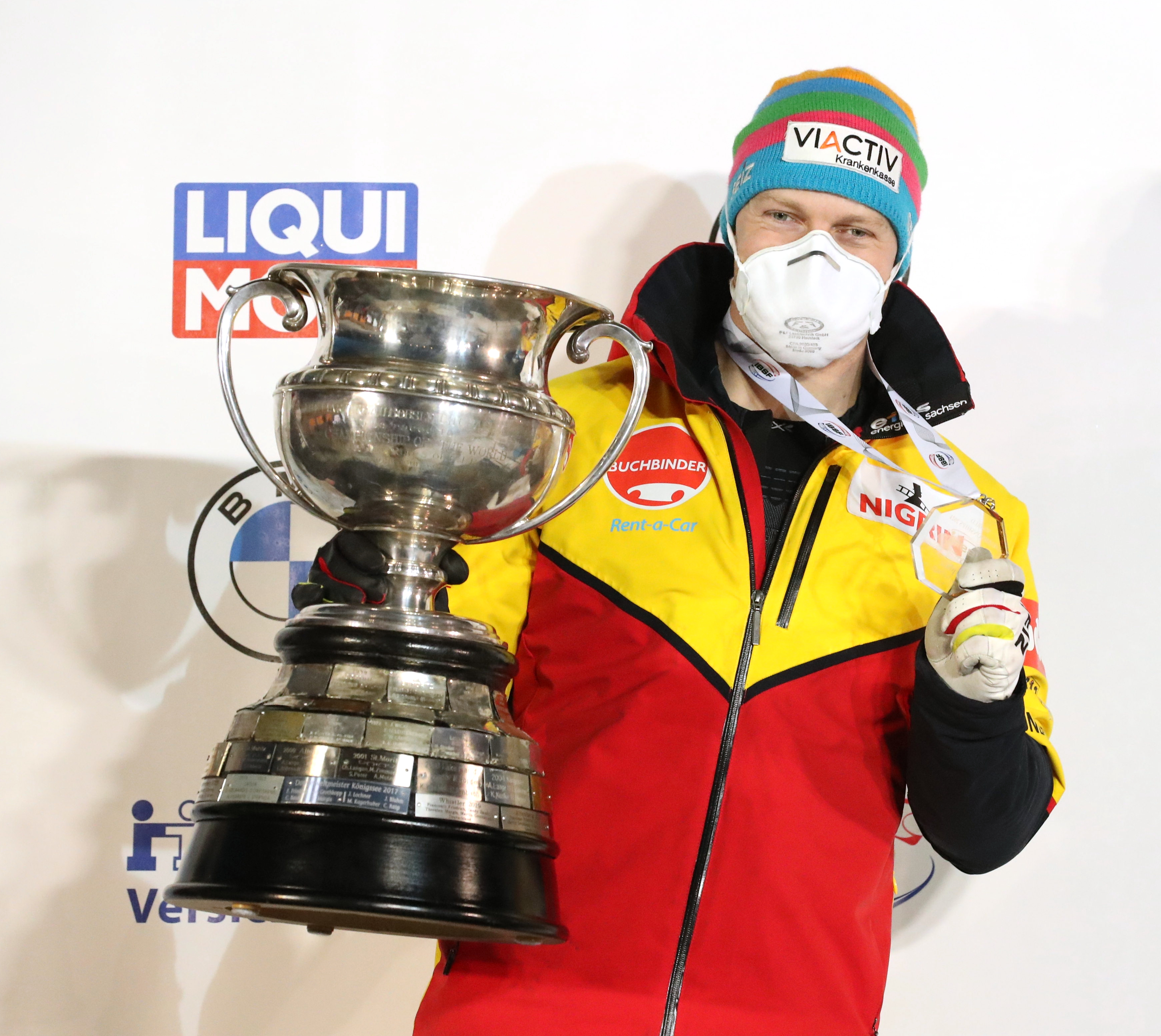
- Four-man bobsleigh Medal Ceremony (Bobsleigh & Skeleton World Championships Altenberg 2021)
- Venue: Altenberg bobsleigh, luge, and skeleton track
- Location: Altenberg, Germany
- Dates: 13–14 February
- Competitors: 98 from 13 nations
- Teams: 24
- Winning time: 3:35.02

Medalists
gold medal	Francesco Friedrich; Thorsten Margis; Candy Bauer; Alexander Schüller	Germany
silver medal	Benjamin Maier; Dănuț Moldovan; Markus Sammer; Kristian Huber	Austria
bronze medal	Johannes Lochner; Florian Bauer; Christopher Weber; Christian Rasp	Germany

The Four-man competition at the IBSF World Championships 2021 was held on 13 and 14 February 2021.

== Results ==
The first two runs were held on 13 February at 15:49 and the last two runs on 14 February at 15:00.

Rank	Bib	Country	Athletes	Run 1	Rank	Run 2	Rank	Run 3	Rank	Run 4	Rank	Total	Behind
1st place, gold medalist(s)	4	Germany	Francesco Friedrich; Thorsten Margis; Candy Bauer; Alexander Schüller	53.78	1	54.26	1	53.22	1	53.76	1	3:35.02	
2nd place, silver medalist(s)	5	Austria	Benjamin Maier; Dănuț Moldovan; Markus Sammer; Kristian Huber	53.86	2	54.56	4	53.46	2	53.93	2	3:35.81	+0.79
3rd place, bronze medalist(s)	7	Germany	Johannes Lochner; Florian Bauer; Christopher Weber; Christian Rasp	54.22	3	54.53	3	53.68	3	54.10	4	3:36.53	+1.51
4	23	Latvia	Oskars Ķibermanis; Dāvis Spriņģis; Matīss Miknis; Krists Lindenblats	54.45	6	54.41	2	53.81	4	54.02	3	3:36.69	+1.67
5	6	Canada	Justin Kripps; Cameron Stones; Ryan Sommer; Ben Coakwell	54.33	4	54.56	4	53.87	5	54.19	6	3:36.95	+1.93
6	9	Germany	Christoph Hafer; Kevin Korona; Christian Hammers; Philipp Wobeto	54.42	5	54.85	14	53.98	6	54.46	12	3:37.71	+2.69
6	8	Bobsleigh Federation of Russia	Rostislav Gaitiukevich; Mikhail Mordasov; Ilya Malykh; Ruslan Samitov	54.46	7	54.95	16	54.12	8	54.18	5	3:37.71	+2.69
8	11	Latvia	Oskars Melbārdis; Edgars Nemme; Lauris Kaufmanis; Intars Dambis	54.51	8	54.71	6	54.05	7	54.49	13	3:37.76	+2.74
9	19	South Korea	Won Yun-jong; Kim Jin-su; Lee Gyeong-min; Jung Hyun-woo	54.65	11	54.75	7	54.12	8	54.43	11	3:37.95	+2.93
10	16	Canada	Christopher Spring; Mike Evelyn; Mark Mlakar; Chris Patrician	54.78	14	54.76	9	54.21	10	54.37	8	3:38.12	+3.10
11	10	Bobsleigh Federation of Russia	Alexey Stulnev; Alexey Zaitsev; Vasiliy Kondratenko; Roman Koshelev	54.88	16	54.77	10	54.31	11	54.41	9	3:38.37	+3.35
12	2	Great Britain	Lamin Deen; Ben Simons; Joel Fearon; Tremayne Gilling	54.89	17	54.81	12	54.36	12	54.41	9	3:38.47	+3.45
13	20	Switzerland	Michael Vogt; Silvio Weber; Sandro Michel (Run 1–2); Oliver Gyger (Run 3–4); Andreas Haas	54.62	10	54.82	13	54.51	13	54.54	15	3:38.49	+3.47
14	22	Bobsleigh Federation of Russia	Maksim Andrianov; Kirill Antukh; Vladislav Zharovtsev; Pavel Travkin	54.96	19	54.75	7	54.52	14	54.27	7	3:38.50	+3.48
15	15	Italy	Patrick Baumgartner; Eric Fantazzini; Costantino Ughi; Lorenzo Bilotti	54.76	13	54.80	11	54.64	15	54.49	13	3:38.69	+3.67
16	12	Czech Republic	Dominik Dvořák; Dominik Suchý; Jan Šindelář; Jáchym Procházka	55.11	21	55.27	19	54.83	17	54.78	18	3:39.99	+4.97
17	14	Netherlands	Ivo de Bruin; Joost Dumas; Dennis Veenker; Janko Franjic	55.19	23	55.37	20	54.84	18	54.63	16	3:40.03	+5.01
18	3	South Korea	Suk Young-jin; Lee Seon-woo; Chae Byung-do; Kim Dong-hyun	54.89	16	55.71	22	54.75	16	54.76	17	3:40.11	+5.09
19	24	Switzerland	Cédric Follador; Nicola Mariani; Dominik Hufschmid; Maruan Giumma	55.26	24	55.48	21	54.90	19	54.79	19	3:40.43	+5.41
–	1	Switzerland	Simon Friedli; Adrian Fässler; Dominik Schläpfer; Gregory Jones	54.57	9	55.77	23	Did not start					
–	17	Great Britain	Brad Hall; Taylor Lawrence; Nick Gleeson; Luke Dawes	54.65	11	55.01	18	Did not start					
–	18	Romania	Mihai Cristian Tentea; Raul Constantin Dobre; Nicolae Ciprian Daroczi; Cristian Radu	54.80	15	55.00	17	Did not start					
–	21	Austria	Markus Treichl; Markus Glück; Sebastian Mitterer; Gregor Glaboniat	55.07	20	54.86	15	Did not start					
–	13	France	Romain Heinrich; Dorian Hauterville; Alan Alais; Steven Borges Mendonaca	55.18	22	Did not start							
