= Kristian Huber =

Austrian bobsledder (born 1997)

Personal information
- Nationality: Austrian
- Born: 13 June 1997 (age 29) Feldkirch, Vorarlberg, Austria
- Height: 1.90 m (6 ft 3 in)
- Weight: 100 kg (220 lb)

Sport
- Country: Austria
- Sport: Bobsleigh
- Event: 4-man / 2-man
- Club: BSC Stubai
Medal record
World Championships
Silver medal – second place	2021 Altenberg	Four-man
European Championships
Silver medal – second place	2021 Winterberg	Four-man

Kristian Huber (born 13 June 1997) is an Austrian bobsledder.

== Career ==
He won a silver medal at the IBSF World Championships 2021 in the four-man event.

Huber also competed for Austria at the 2022 Winter Olympics.
