= Max Hauke =

Austrian cross-country skier

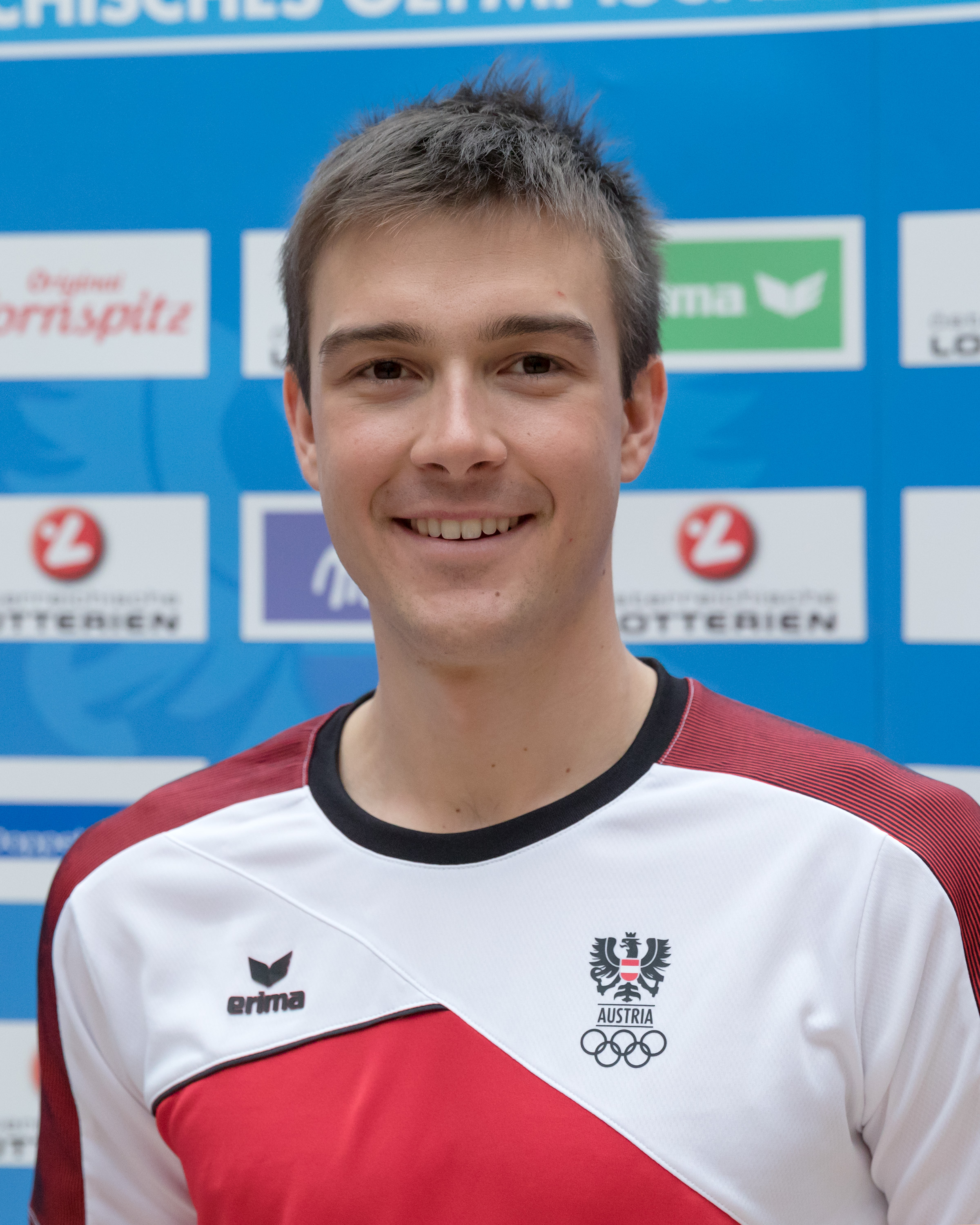
- Hauke in 2018

Personal information
- Nationality: Austria
- Born: 29 August 1992 (age 34) Rottenmann, Austria

Sport
- Sport: Skiing
- Club: WSV Ramsau

World Cup career
- Seasons: 2012–2019
- Indiv. starts: 54
- Indiv. podiums: 0
- Team starts: 2
- Team podiums: 0
- Overall titles: 0 – (80th in 2018)
- Discipline titles: 0
- Updated on 12 April 2019

Max Hauke (born 29 August 1992) is a cross-country skier from Austria.

== Career ==
He competed for Austria at the 2014 Winter Olympics in the cross-country skiing events.

During the FIS Nordic World Ski Championships 2019, he was apprehended during a raid by Austrian police and charged with doping offenses alongside his teammate Dominik Baldauf and three other athletes from Estonia and Kazakhstan.

Soon after, a video surfaced showing Hauke being caught red-handed by the Austrian police in the middle of a blood transfusion as part of the act of blood doping. The policeman, who leaked the video in the private group of an instant messaging app, subsequent to which the video spread on the Internet, was charged with malpractice. The unidentified officer may face up to three years in prison, if found guilty. In a lengthy interview to the Swedish newspaper Expressen, Hauke thought this to be the first such depiction in sports.

In July 2019, Hauke was handed a four-year ban by the Austrian Anti-Doping Commission.

== World Cup results ==
All results are sourced from the International Ski Federation (FIS).

=== World Cup standings ===
Season	Age	Season standings				Ski Tour standings			
Season	Age	Overall	Distance	Sprint	U23	Nordic Opening	Tour de Ski	World Cup Final	Ski Tour Canada
2012	20	NC	DNP	NC	—N/a	DNP	DNP	DNP	—N/a
2013	21	NC	DNP	NC	—N/a	DNP	DNP	DNP	—N/a
2014	22	130	83	NC	—N/a	DNP	DNP	DNP	—N/a
2015	23	NC	NC	NC	NC	89	43	—N/a	—N/a
2016	24	NC	DNP	NC	—N/a	DNP	DNP	—N/a	DNP
2017	25	166	114	NC	—N/a	DNP	38	DNP	—N/a
2018	26	80	51	DNP	—N/a	DNP	DNP	DNP	—N/a
2019	27	97	63	NC	—N/a	37	DNF	DNP	—N/a
