= IBSF European Championships 2021 =

- Venue: Winterberg bobsleigh, luge, and skeleton track
- Location: Winterberg, Germany
- Dates: 8–10 January

The 2021 IBSF European Championships were held from 8 to 10 January 2021 in Winterberg, Germany. IBSF European Championships is the European Championships for bobsleigh and skeleton.

== Medal summary ==
=== Medal table ===
* Host nation (Germany)

Rank	Nation	Gold	Silver	Bronze	Total
1	Germany*	3	3	2	8
2	Russia	2	0	1	3
3	Austria	0	1	3	4
4	Latvia	0	1	0	1
Totals (4 entries)		5	5	6	16

=== Bobsleigh ===
Event	Gold		Silver		Bronze	
Two-man	Germany; Francesco Friedrich; Thorsten Margis	1:50.08	Germany; Johannes Lochner; Eric Franke	1:50.75	Austria; Benjamin Maier; Markus Sammer	1:50.93
Four-man	Germany; Francesco Friedrich; Thorsten Margis; Candy Bauer; Alexander Schüller	1:48.13	Austria; Benjamin Maier; Sascha Stepan; Markus Sammer; Kristian Huber	1:48.89	Russia; Rostislav Gaitiukevich; Mikhail Mordasov; Ilya Malykh; Ruslan Samitov	1:49.08
Two-woman	Germany; Laura Nolte; Deborah Levi	1:53.60	Germany; Kim Kalicki; Ann-Christin Strack	1:54.02	Austria; Katrin Beierl; Jennifer Onasanya Germany; Mariama Jamanka; Leonie Fiebig	1:54.39

=== Skeleton ===
Event	Gold		Silver		Bronze	
Men	Aleksandr Tretyakov; Russia	1:52.36	Martins Dukurs; Latvia	1:52.53	Alexander Gassner; Germany	1:52.57
Women	Elena Nikitina; Russia	1:55.10	Tina Hermann; Germany	1:55.16	Janine Flock; Austria	1:55.29

== See also ==
- IBSF World Championships 2021
- IBSF Junior World Championships 2021
