= Mayerhofer =

Mayerhofer or Mayerhöfer is a German language habitational surname. Notable people with the name include:

- Christian Mayerhöfer (born 1971), German former field hockey player
- Elfie Mayerhofer (1917–1992), Austrian film actress and singer
- Veronika Mayerhofer (born 1992), Austrian cross-country skier

== See also ==
- Anna Paulina Luna (née Mayerhofer, born 1989), American politician
