= Sebastian Heufler =

Austrian bobsledder (born 1991)

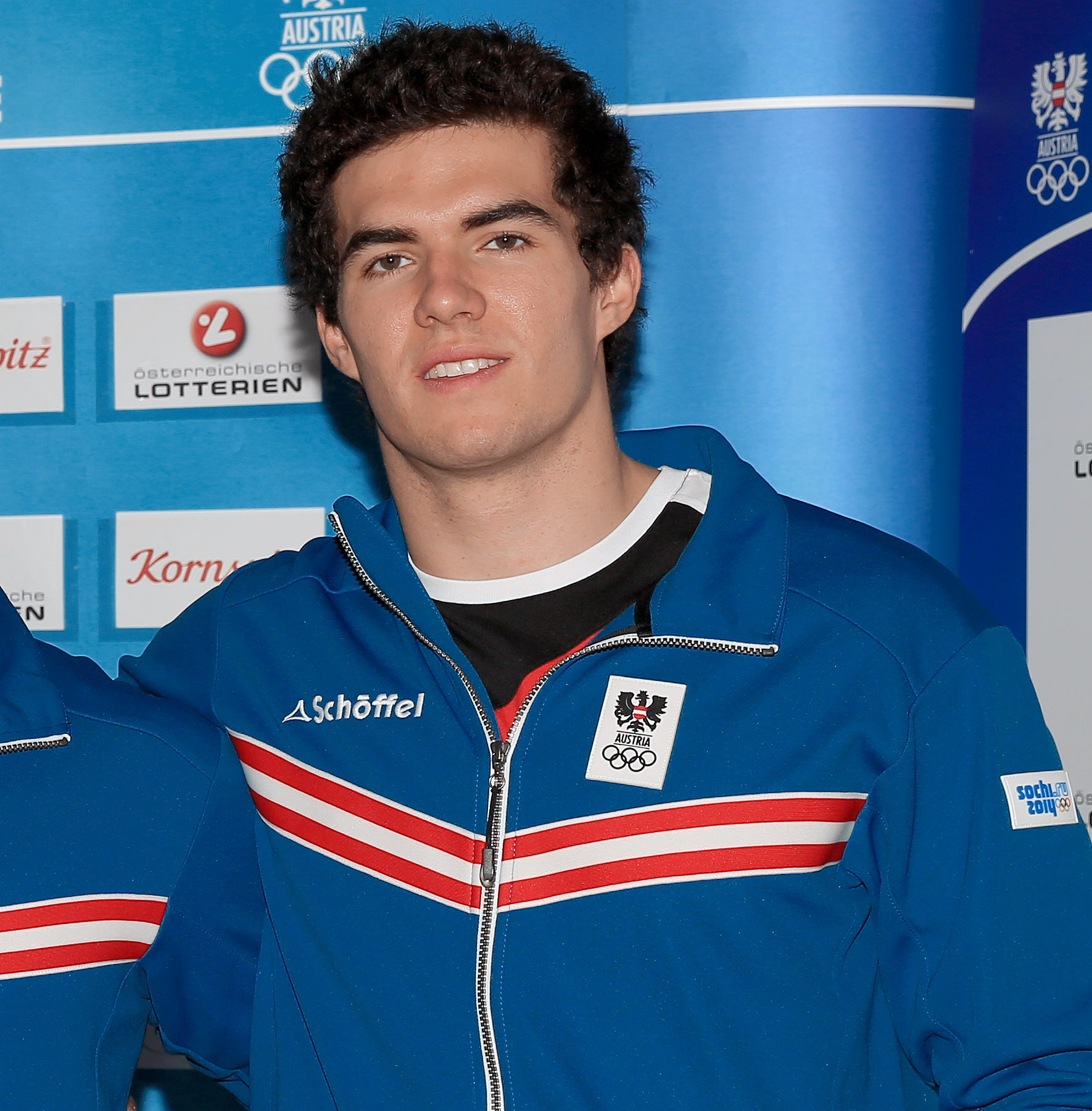

Personal information
- Nationality: Austrian
- Born: 14 October 1991 (age 34) Vienna, Austria
- Height: 1.92 m (6 ft 4 in)
- Weight: 97 kg (214 lb)

Sport
- Country: Austria
- Sport: Bobsleigh

Sebastian Heufler (born 14 October 1991 in Vienna) is an Austrian bobsledder.

Heufler competed at the 2014 Winter Olympics for Austria. He teamed with driver Benjamin Maier, Markus Sammer, Stefan Withalm and Angel Somov in the four-man event, finishing 21st. Heufler replaced Sammer in the sled for the third run.

As of April 2014, his best showing at the World Championships is 11th, coming in the team event in 2013. His best finish in an Olympic discipline is 29th, in the two-man in 2013.

Heufler made his World Cup debut in January 2012. As of April 2014, his best finish is 8th, in a four-man event in 2012-13 at Altenberg.
