= Markus Sammer =

Austrian bobsledder (born 1988)

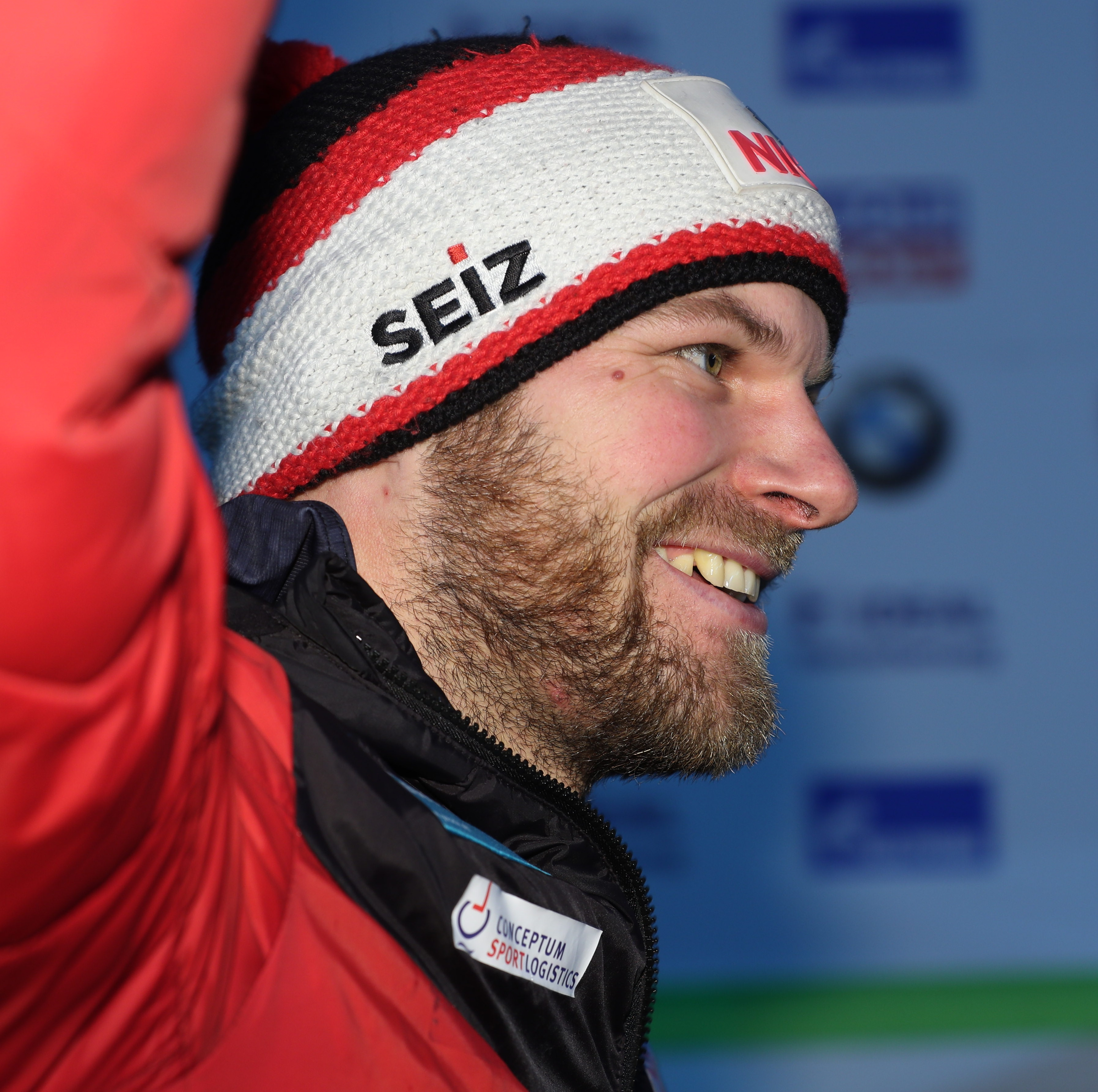
- Sammer in 2020

Personal information
- Nationality: Austrian
- Born: 20 May 1988 (age 38) Kufstein, Austria
- Height: 1.88 m (6 ft 2 in)
- Weight: 95 kg (209 lb)

Sport
- Country: Austria
- Sport: Bobsleigh
- Event: Four-man
Medal record
World Championships
Silver medal – second place	2021 Altenberg	Four-man
European Championships
Silver medal – second place	2016 St. Moritz	Four-man
Silver medal – second place	2021 Winterberg	Four-man
Bronze medal – third place	2017 Winterberg	Four-man
Bronze medal – third place	2021 Winterberg	Two-man

Markus Sammer (born 20 May 1988) is an Austrian bobsledder.

== Career ==
Sammer competed at the 2014 Winter Olympics for Austria. He teamed with driver Benjamin Maier in the two-man event, finishing 22nd, and with Maier, Stefan Withalm, Angel Somov and Sebastian Heufler in the four-man event, finishing 21st.

As of April 2014, his best showing at the World Championships is 22nd, in the 2013 four-man event.

Sammer made his World Cup debut in November 2012. As of April 2014, his best finish is 8th in a four-man event in 2013–14 at Altenberg.

He also competed for Austria at the 2022 Winter Olympics.
