= Angel Somov =

Austrian bobsledder (born 1990)

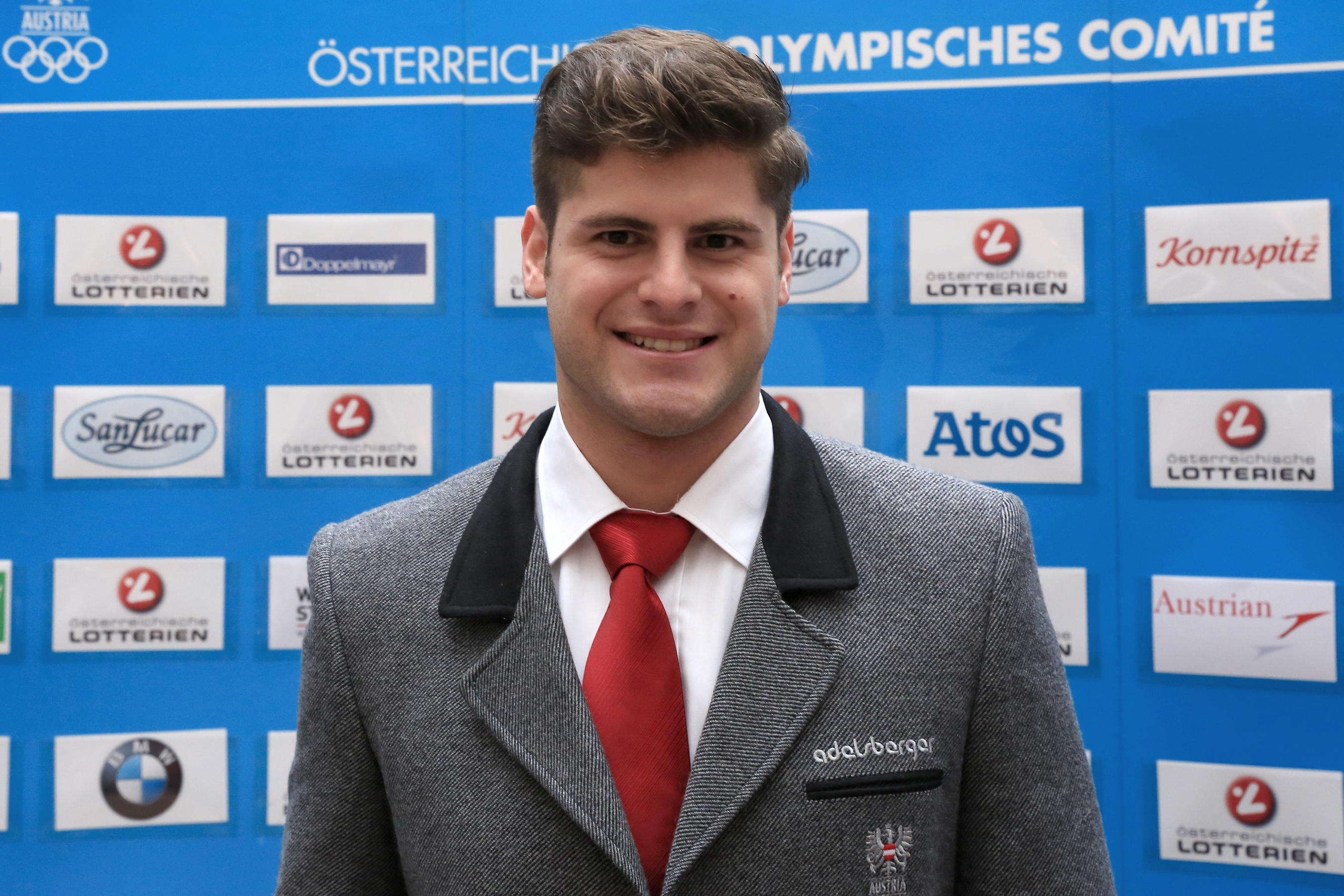
- Angel Somov at the Winter Olympics in 2014

Personal information
- Nationality: Austrian
- Born: 29 August 1990 (age 35) Vienna, Austria
- Height: 1.90 m (6 ft 3 in)
- Weight: 98 kg (216 lb)

Sport
- Country: Austria
- Sport: Bobsleigh

Angel Somov (born August 29, 1990 in Vienna) is an Austrian bobsledder.

Somov competed at the 2014 Winter Olympics for Austria. He teamed with driver Benjamin Maier, Markus Sammer, Stefan Withalm and Sebastian Heufler in the four-man event, finishing 21st.

Somov made his World Cup debut in January 2014. As of April 2014, his best finish is 22nd, in a four-man event in 2013-14 at Konigssee.
