= Stefan Withalm =

Austrian bobsledder

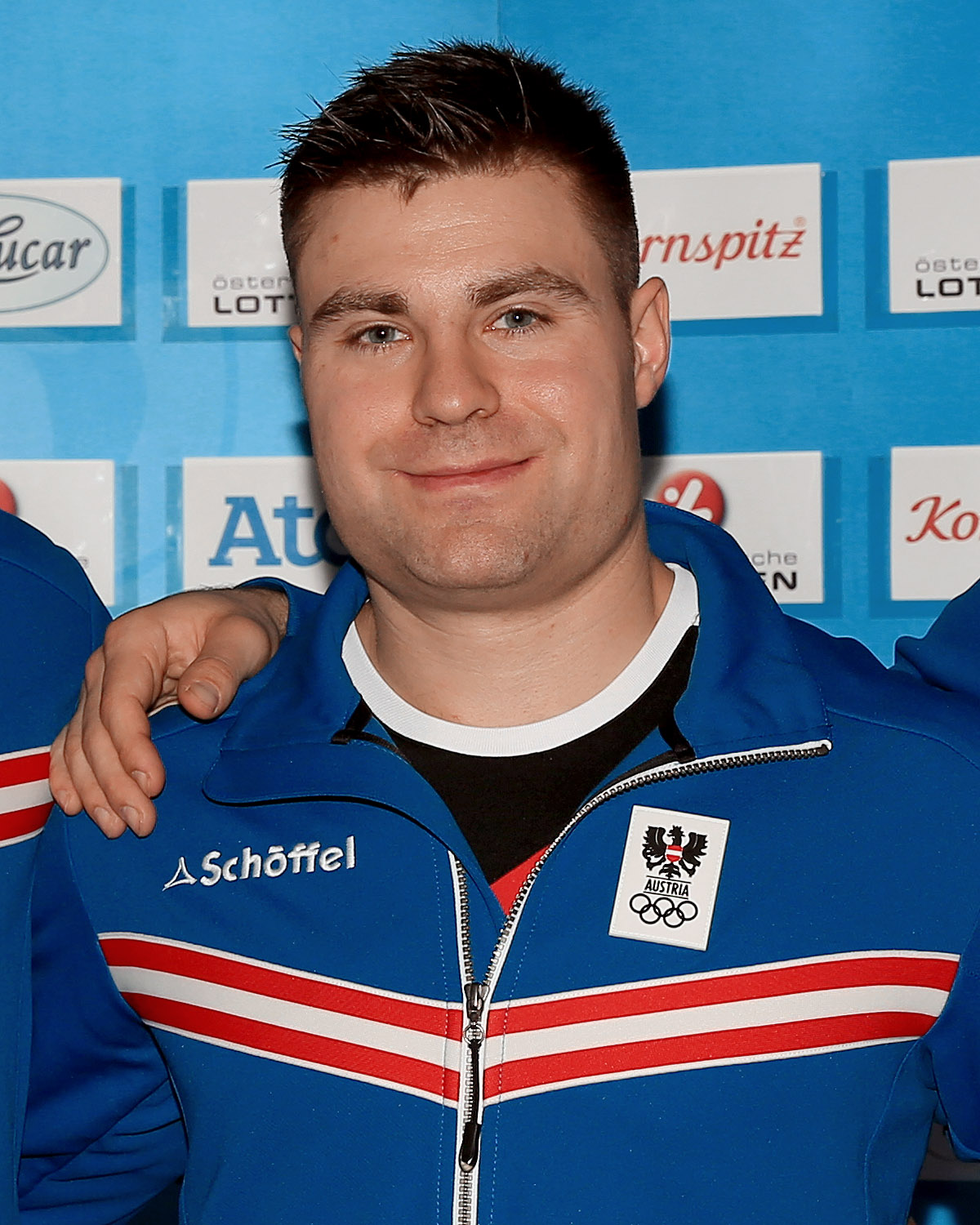

Personal information
- Nationality: Austrian
- Born: 29 March 1983 (age 42) Vienna, Austria
- Height: 1.81 m (5 ft 11 in)
- Weight: 100 kg (220 lb)

Sport
- Country: Austria
- Sport: Bobsleigh

Stefan Withalm (born 29 March 1983 in Vienna) is an Austrian bobsledder.

Withalm competed at the 2014 Winter Olympics for Austria. He teamed with driver Benjamin Maier, Markus Sammer, Angel Somov and Sebastian Heufler in the four-man event, finishing 21st.

Withalm made his World Cup debut in December 2011. As of April 2014, his best finish is 7th, in a four-man event in 2011-12 at Konigssee.
