= Philomena Bair =

Austrian freestyle skier (born 1996)

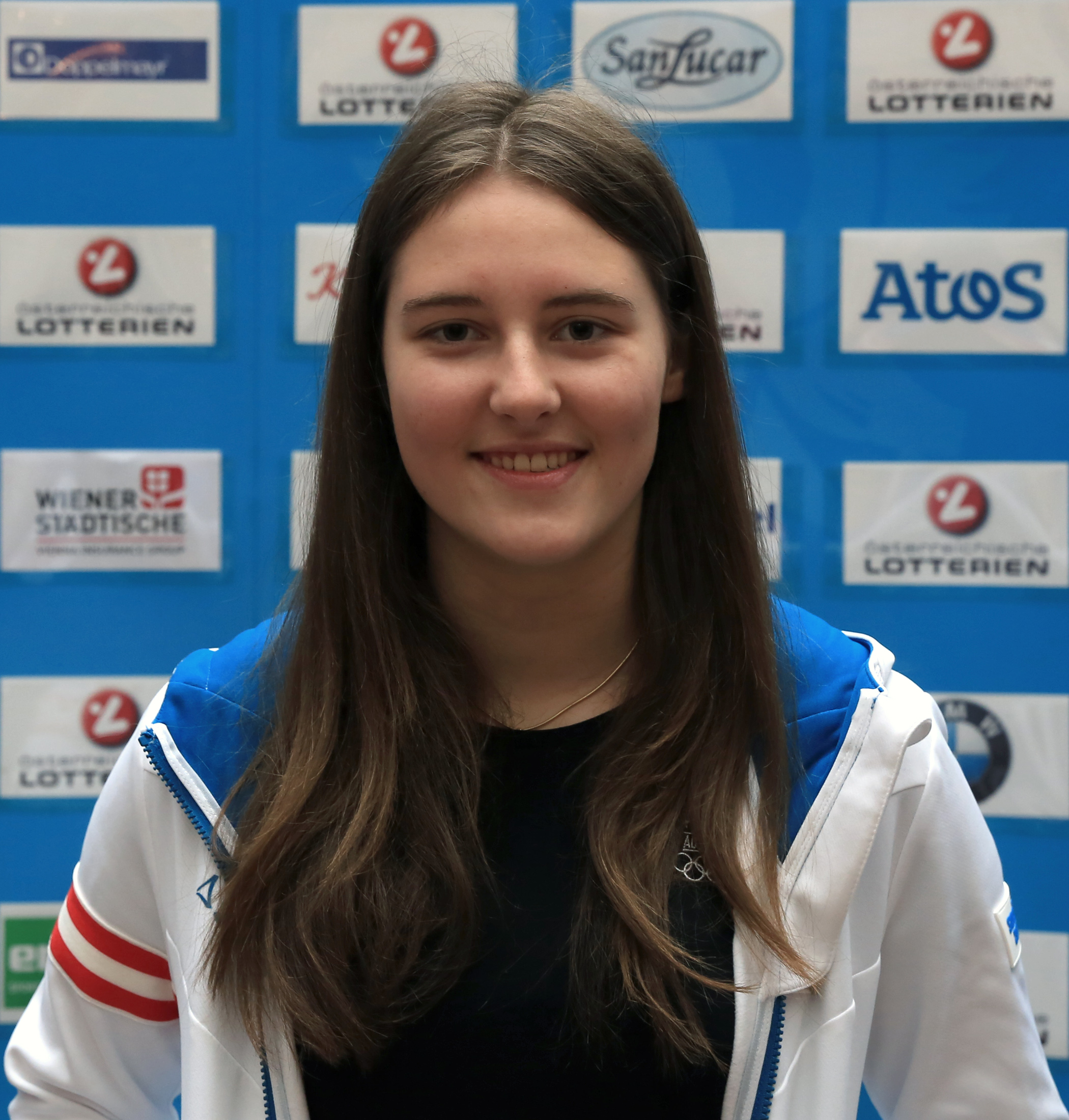

Personal information
- Nationality: Austria
- Born: 24 February 1996 (age 29) Hall in Tirol, Austria
- Height: 5 ft 7 in (1.70 m)
- Weight: 137 lb (62 kg)

Philomena Bair (born 24 February 1996 in Hall in Tirol) is an Austrian freestyle skier who competed at the 2014 Winter Olympics.
