= Ruslan Samitov =

Russian athlete (born 1991)

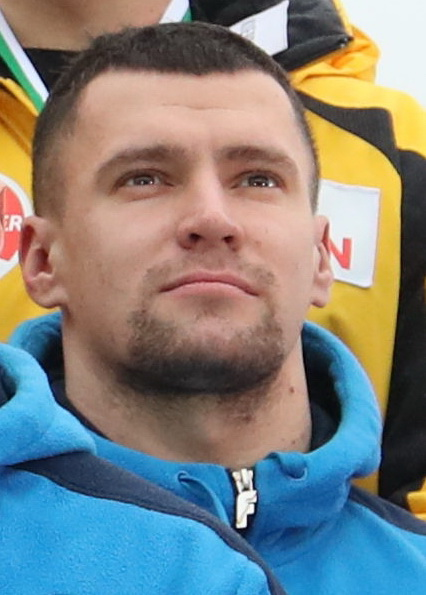
- Samitov in 2019

Medal record

Representing Russia

Men's athletics

European Indoor Championships
| Silver medal – second place | 2013 Gothenburg | Triple jump |

Men's bobsleigh

European Championships
| Bronze medal – third place | 2021 Winterberg | Four-man |

Ruslan Rustemovich Samitov (Russian: Руслан Рустемович Самитов; born 11 July 1991) is a Russian bobsleigh athlete and former track and field athlete who competed in the triple jump. His personal best is 17.30 metres. He was the runner-up at the 2013 European Athletics Indoor Championships.

== Triple jump ==
Samitov made his international debut at the 2009 European Athletics Junior Championships, where he finished fourth. He also cleared sixteen metres in the event for the first time that year. He improved to 16.51 m in 2010 and jumped 16.90 m the following year.

At the regional Volga championships in 2011, he pushed himself into second in the Russian rankings behind Lyukman Adams by clearing 17.25 m. He was chosen to compete at the 2012 European Athletics Championships, but did not progress beyond the qualifiers. At the start of the 2013 season, he jumped an indoor best of 17.06 m to win the Russian indoor title, and he surprised with a new lifetime best of 17.30 m at the 2013 European Athletics Indoor Championships to win the silver medal behind Daniele Greco.

== Bobsleigh ==
He began competing in bobsleigh as a brakeman in 2016. He took part in the 2017 European Bobsleigh Championships. He represented Russia at the 2018 Winter Olympics, then competed at the European and World Bobsleigh Championships in 2019 and 2020.
