= Benjamin Maier =

Austrian bobsledder

- Maier in 2026

Personal information
- Nationality: Austrian
- Born: 19 April 1994 (age 32) Hall in Tirol, Austria
- Height: 1.82 m (6 ft 0 in)
- Weight: 93 kg (205 lb)
- Spouse: Elisabeth Vathje (m. 2018)

Sport
- Country: Austria
- Sport: Bobsleigh
- Event: Two-man Four-man
- Club: BSC-Stubai
Medal record
World Championships
Silver medal – second place	2016 Igls	Mixed team
Silver medal – second place	2021 Altenberg	Four-man
European Championships
Silver medal – second place	2016 St. Moritz	Four-man
Silver medal – second place	2021 Winterberg	Four-man
Bronze medal – third place	2017 Winterberg	Four-man
Bronze medal – third place	2021 Winterberg	Two-man
World Cup
Silver medal – second place	2021 Igls	Four-man
Silver medal – second place	2021 Königssee	Four-man
Silver medal – second place	2021 St. Moritz	Four-man
Silver medal – second place	2018 Königssee	Four-man
Silver medal – second place	2016 Königssee	Four-man
Silver medal – second place	2016 St. Moritz	Four-man
Bronze medal – third place	2021 Königssee	Two-man
Bronze medal – third place	2021 Winterberg	Two-man
Bronze medal – third place	2021 Winterberg	Four-man
Bronze medal – third place	2020 Lake Placid	Four-man
Bronze medal – third place	2019 Sigulda	Two-man
Bronze medal – third place	2017 Igls	Two-man
Bronze medal – third place	2017 Winterberg	Four-man

Benjamin Maier (born 19 April 1994) is an Austrian bobsledder.

== Career ==
Maier competed at the 2014 Winter Olympics for Austria. He teamed with brakeman Markus Sammer in the two-man event, finishing 22nd, and with Sammer, Stefan Withalm, Angel Somov and Sebastian Heufler in the four-man event, finishing 21st.

As of February 2016, his best showing at the World Championships is a bronze medal in the 2013 team event. His best finish in an Olympic event is 5th in the 2016 four-man event.

Maier made his World Cup debut in January 2014. As of February 2016, his best finish is 2nd two times, in 2015–16 at St. Moritz and Schönau am Königssee.

He also competed at the 2018 Winter Olympics and 2022 Winter Olympics.

== Personal life ==
Maier married Canadian skeleton athlete Elisabeth Vathje in 2018.
