= 2015–16 ISU Speed Skating World Cup =

Series of international speed skating competitions

The 2015–16 ISU Speed Skating World Cup, officially the ISU World Cup Speed Skating 2015–2016, was a series of international speed skating competitions that ran the entire season. The season started on 13 November 2015 in Calgary, Alberta, Canada, and ended with the final on 13 March 2016 in Heerenveen, Netherlands.

In total, six competition weekends were held at five different locations, 18 cups were contested (nine for men, and nine for women), and 88 races took place. Additionally, there were two Grand World Cups, one for men and one for women, in which all individual races, regardless of distance, counted.

The World Cup is organized by the International Skating Union (ISU).

== Calendar ==
The detailed schedule for the season.

WC #	City	Venue	Date	500 m	1000 m	1500 m	3000 m	5000 m	10000 m	Mass start	Team pursuit	Team sprint
1	Calgary	Olympic Oval	13–15 November	2m, 2w	m, w	m, w	w	m		m, w	m, w	m, w
2	Salt Lake City	Utah Olympic Oval	20–22 November	2m, 2w	m, w	m, w		w	m	m, w		m, w
3	Inzell	Eisstadion Inzell	4–6 December	2m, 2w	m, w	m, w	w	m		m, w	m, w	
4	Heerenveen	Thialf	11–13 December	2m, 2w	m, w	m, w	w	m		m, w	m, w	m, w
	Minsk	Minsk-Arena	9–10 January	2016 European Speed Skating Championships								
5	Stavanger	Sørmarka Arena	29–31 January	2m, 2w	2m, 2w	m, w	w	m				
	Kolomna	Kolomna Speed Skating Center	11–14 February	2016 World Single Distance Speed Skating Championships								
	Seoul	Taereung International Ice Rink	27–28 February	2016 World Sprint Speed Skating Championships								
	Berlin	Sportforum Hohenschönhausen	5–6 March	2016 World Allround Speed Skating Championships								
6	Heerenveen	Thialf	11–13 March	2m, 2w	m, w	m, w	w	m		m, w	m, w	m, w
Total				12m, 12w	7m, 7w	6m, 6w	5w	5m, 1w	1m	5m, 5w	4m, 4w	4m, 4w

Note: the men's 5000 and 10000 metres were contested as one cup, and the women's 3000 and 5000 metres were contested as one cup, as indicated by the color coding.

In addition, there were two combination cups, the allround combination and the sprint combination. For the allround combination, the distances were 1500 + 5000 metres for men, and 1500 + 3000 metres for women. For the sprint combination, the distances were 500 + 1000 metres, both for men and women. These cups were contested only in World Cup 5, in Stavanger, Norway.

== Entry rules ==
=== Qualification criteria ===
In order to qualify, skaters had to achieve the following results in ISU events, international competitions or national championships between 1 July 2014 and the entry deadline for the competition concerned.

Men
Distance	Time required ^{A}	Time required ^{B}
500 m	36.20	36.60
1000 m	1:11.90	1:12.80
1500 m	1:51.00	1:52.50
3000 m	—	—
5000 m	6:48.00	6:52.00
10000 m	13:40.00 ^{C}	13:50.00 ^{D}

Women
Distance	Time required ^{A}	Time required ^{B}
500 m	40.00	40.50
1000 m	1:20.00	1:21.00
1500 m	2:03.00	2:05.00
3000 m	4:24.00	4:28.00
5000 m	7:25.00 ^{E}	7:32.00 ^{F}
10000 m	—	—

^{A} in the Olympic Oval, Calgary, or the Utah Olympic Oval, Salt Lake City
^{B} in other ice rinks
^{C} or 6:35.00 on 5000 m
^{D} or 6:40.00 on 5000 m
^{E} or 4:15.00 on 3000 m
^{F} or 4:20.00 on 3000 m

For the mass start and team pursuit events, skaters who had achieved any one of the above results were qualified. However, every ISU member nation was allowed to enter a maximum of one skater per gender who had not achieved any of these results, provided that they had achieved a 1500 m result of 1:57.50 (men) or 2:10.00 (women).

== World records ==
World records going into the 2015–16 season.

=== Men ===
Distance	Time	Holder(s)	Nat.	Date	Venue	Reference
500 m	34.03	Jeremy Wotherspoon	(Canada)	9 November 2007	Utah Olympic Oval, Salt Lake City	
1000 m	1:06.42	Shani Davis	(United States)	7 March 2009	Utah Olympic Oval, Salt Lake City	
1500 m	1:41.04	Shani Davis	(United States)	11 December 2009	Utah Olympic Oval, Salt Lake City	
5000 m	6:03.32	Sven Kramer	(Netherlands)	17 November 2007	Olympic Oval, Calgary	
10000 m	12:41.69	Sven Kramer	(Netherlands)	10 March 2007	Utah Olympic Oval, Salt Lake City	
Team pursuit (8 laps)	3:35.60	Koen Verweij; Jan Blokhuijsen; Sven Kramer	(Netherlands)	16 November 2013	Utah Olympic Oval, Salt Lake City	

=== Women ===
Distance	Time	Holder(s)	Nat.	Date	Venue	Reference
500 m	36.36	Lee Sang-hwa	(South Korea)	16 November 2013	Utah Olympic Oval, Salt Lake City	
1000 m	1:12.58	Brittany Bowe	(United States)	17 November 2013	Utah Olympic Oval, Salt Lake City	
1500 m	1:51.79	Cindy Klassen	(Canada)	20 November 2005	Utah Olympic Oval, Salt Lake City	
3000 m	3:53.34	Cindy Klassen	(Canada)	18 March 2006	Olympic Oval, Calgary	
5000 m	6:42.66	Martina Sáblíková	(Czech Republic)	18 February 2011	Utah Olympic Oval, Salt Lake City	
Team pursuit (6 laps)	2:55.79	Kristina Groves; Christine Nesbitt; Brittany Schussler	(Canada)	6 December 2009	Olympic Oval, Calgary	

- New records :
- 500 m (Russia) Pavel Kulizhnikov
- 1000 m (lowland) (Russia) Pavel Kulizhnikov
- 1500 (United States) Heather Richardson-Bergsma
- 1000 m (United States) Brittany Bowe
- 10.000 m (Canada) Ted-Jan Bloemen

== Men's standings ==
=== 500 m ===
Rank	Name	Points
1	(Russia) Pavel Kulizhnikov	705
2	(Russia) Ruslan Murashov	705
3	(Canada) Gilmore Junio	637

=== 1000 m ===
Rank	Name	Points
1	(Netherlands) Kjeld Nuis	630
2	(Russia) Pavel Kulizhnikov	480
3	(Netherlands) Gerben Jorritsma	396

=== 1500 m ===
Rank	Name	Points
1	(Russia) Denis Yuskov	530
2	(Netherlands) Kjeld Nuis	456
3	(United States) Joey Mantia	405

=== 5000 and 10000 m ===
Rank	Name	Points
1	(Netherlands) Sven Kramer	530
2	(Netherlands) Jorrit Bergsma	530
3	(Norway) Sverre Lunde Pedersen	369

=== Mass start ===
Rank	Name	Points
1	(Netherlands) Arjan Stroetinga	404
2	(Netherlands) Jorrit Bergsma	380
3	(Italy) Fabio Francolini	378

=== Team pursuit ===
Rank	Country	Points
1	Netherlands	350
2	Norway	280
3	Poland	279

=== Team sprint ===
Rank	Country	Points
1	Netherlands	390
2	Russia	334
3	Canada	320

=== Grand World Cup ===
Rank	Name	Points
1	(Netherlands) Kjeld Nuis	630
2	(Belgium) Bart Swings	580
2	(Russia) Pavel Kulizhnikov	530

== Women's standings ==
=== 500 m ===
Rank	Name	Points
1	(United States) Heather Richardson-Bergsma	848
2	(China) Zhang Hong	842
3	(United States) Brittany Bowe	785

=== 1000 m ===
Rank	Name	Points
1	(United States) Brittany Bowe	710
2	(United States) Heather Richardson-Bergsma	508
3	(Netherlands) Marrit Leenstra	465

=== 1500 m ===
Rank	Name	Points
1	(United States) Brittany Bowe	590
2	(United States) Heather Richardson-Bergsma	501
3	(Netherlands) Marrit Leenstra	396

=== 3000 and 5000 m ===
Rank	Name	Points
1	(Czech Republic) Martina Sábliková	500
2	(Russia) Natalya Voronina	450
3	(Netherlands) Irene Schouten	361

=== Mass start ===
Rank	Name	Points
1	(Netherlands) Irene Schouten	466
2	(Canada) Ivanie Blondin	420
3	(Japan) Misaki Oshigiri	271

=== Team pursuit ===
Rank	Country	Points
1	Japan	430
2	Netherlands	380
3	Russia	290

=== Team sprint ===
Rank	Country	Points
1	China	330
2	Netherlands	314
3	Japan	290

=== Grand World Cup ===
Rank	Name	Points
1	(United States) Heather Richardson-Bergsma	1020
2	(United States) Brittany Bowe	960
3	(Czech Republic) Martina Sábliková	770
