= 2015–16 ISU Speed Skating World Cup – Men's 1500 metres =

The 1500 meters distance for men in the 2015–16 ISU Speed Skating World Cup will be contested over six races on six occasions, out of a total of World Cup occasions for the season, with the first occasion taking place in Calgary, Alberta, Canada, on 13–15 November 2015, and the final occasion taking place in Heerenveen, Netherlands, on 11–13 March 2016.

The defending champion is Denny Morrison of Canada.

== Top three ==
Position	Athlete	Points	Previous season

== Race medallists ==
WC #	Location	Date	Gold	Time	Silver	Time	Bronze	Time	Report
1	Calgary, Canada	15 November	Denis Yuskov; Russia	1:41.88	Bart Swings; Belgium	1:42.480	Joey Mantia; United States	1:42.482	
2	Salt Lake City, United States	20 November	Kjeld Nuis; Netherlands	1:42.14	Joey Mantia; United States	1:42.45	Shani Davis; United States	1:42.90	
3	Inzell, Germany	6 December	Denis Yuskov; Russia	1:44.21	Kjeld Nuis; Netherlands	1:45.20	Joey Mantia; United States	1:45.25	
4	Heerenveen, Netherlands	13 December	Joey Mantia; United States	1:44.26	Denis Yuskov; Russia	1:44.38	Kjeld Nuis; Netherlands	1:45.33	
5	Stavanger, Norway	29 January	Denis Yuskov; Russia	1:44.94	Bart Swings; Belgium	1:45.88	Kjeld Nuis; Netherlands	1:46.11	
6	Heerenveen, Netherlands	13 March	Denis Yuskov; Russia	1:45.39	Sverre Lunde Pedersen; Norway	1:45.46	Bart Swings; Belgium	1:45.65	

== Standings ==
#	Name	Nat.	CGY	SLC	INZ	HVN1	STA	HVN2	Total
1	Denis Yuskov	(Russia)	100	0	100	80	100	150	530
2	Kjeld Nuis	(Netherlands)	60	100	80	70	70	76	456
3	Joey Mantia	(United States)	70	80	70	100	45	40	405
4	Bart Swings	(Belgium)	80	50	—	50	80	104	364
5	Thomas Krol	(Netherlands)	45	28	60	60	60	0	253
6	Shani Davis	(United States)	36	70	18	36	50	36	210
7	Sverre Lunde Pedersen	(Norway)	40	60	32	45	32	120	209
8	Jan Szymanski	(Poland)	24	32	45	40	36		177
9	Håvard Bøkko	(Norway)	21	45	40	28	40		174
10	Konrad Niedzwiedzki	(Poland)	50	12	50	—	28		140
11	Vincent De Haitre	(Canada)	12	21	24	32	16		105
12	Gerben Jorritsma	(Netherlands)	32	36	36	—	—		104
13	Li Bailin	(China)	28	40	—	—	18		86
14	Sergey Trofimov	(Poland)	16	14	10	21	24		85
15	Haralds Silovs	(Latvia)	14	10	28	—	21		73
16	Takuro Oda	(Japan)	—	25	21	14	12		72
17	Sindre Henriksen	(Norway)	15	18	16	16	6		71
18	Joo Hyung-joon	(South Korea)	18	24	5	12	10		69
19	Kirill Golubev	(Russia)	19	16	14	8	—		57
20	Andrea Giovannini	(Italy)	0	2	19	18	14		53
21	Zbigniew Brodka	(Poland)	8	4	11	2	25		50
22	Peter Michael	(New Zealand)	—	—	25	24	—		49
23	Sergey Gryaztsov	(Russia)	0	15	12	19	—		46
24	Jan Blokhuijsen	(Japan)	—	19	8	10	—		37
25	Jeffrey Swider-Peltz	(United States)	—	—	2	25	5		32
26	Denis Kuzin	(Kazakhstan)	4	0	—	15	8		27
27	Konrád Nagy	(Hungary)	8	6	4	0	8		26
28	Ted-Jan Bloemen	(Canada)	25	—	—	—	0		25
29	Vitaly Mikhailov	(Belarus)	11	8	6	0	0		25
30	Kim Jin-su	(South Korea)	0	0	15	6	—		21
31	Patrick Roest	(Netherlands)	—	—	0	0	19		19
32	Danil Sinitsyn	(Russia)	—	—	8	8	0		16
33	Mikhail Kozlov	(Russia)	—	—	—	—	15		15
34	Benjamin Donnelly	(Canada)	0	0	—	—	11		11
35	David Andersson	(Sweden)	0	11	—	—	0		11
36	Jonathan Garcia	(United States)	—	—	—	11	—		11
37	Wouter olde Heuvel	(Netherlands)	10	0	—	—	—		10
38	Kim Cheol-min	(South Korea)	1	8	1	0	0		10
39	Alexis Contin	(France)	—	6	—	4	—		10
40	Douwe de Vries	(Netherlands)	—	—	—	—	6		6
41	Olivier Jean	(Canada)	0	0	0	6	0		6
42	Fan Yang	(China)	6	0	0	0	—		6
43	Sven Kramer	(Netherlands)	6	—	—	—	—		6
44	Aleksander Waagenes	(Norway)	—	—	6	0	—		6
45	Shota Nakamura	(Japan)	0	—	—	—	4		4
46	Taro Kondo	(Japan)	—		—	—	2		2
47	Patrick Beckert	(Germany)	2	—	—	—	0		2
48	Magnus Myhren Kristensen	(Norway)	—	—	—	—	1		1
49	Hubert Hirschbichler	(Germany)	—	0	0	1	0		1
50	Sebastian Klosinski	(United States)	0	1	0	0	—		1
