= 2015–16 ISU Speed Skating World Cup – Men's team sprint =

The men's team sprint in the 2015–16 ISU Speed Skating World Cup was contested over four races, out of a total of six World Cup occasions for the season, with the first occasion taking place in Calgary, Alberta, Canada, on 14 November 2015, and the final occasion taking place in Heerenveen, Netherlands, on 12 March 2016.

The team sprint was a new event for the season. The Netherlands won the inaugural world cup classification.

== Top three ==
Position	Country	Points

== Race medallists ==
WC #	Location	Date	Gold	Time	Silver	Time	Bronze	Time	Report
1	Calgary, Canada	14 November	Netherlands; Ronald Mulder; Kai Verbij; Stefan Groothuis	1:18.79; WR	United States; Mitchell Whitmore; Jonathan Garcia; Joey Mantia	1:19.39	Russia; Ruslan Murashov; Artyom Kuznetsov; Aleksey Yesin	1:19.59	
2	Salt Lake City, United States	22 November	Canada; William Dutton; Alexandre St-Jean; Vincent De Haître	1.17.75; WR	Russia; Kirill Golubev; Artyom Kuznetsov; Aleksey Yesin	1.19.12	Netherlands; Hein Otterspeer; Kai Verbij; Stefan Groothuis	1.19.20	
4	Heerenveen, Netherlands	11 December	Canada; Gilmore Junio; Alexandre St-Jean; Vincent De Haître	1:19.75	Russia; Ruslan Murashov; Aleksey Yesin; Kirill Golubev; Artyom Kuznetsov	1:21.27	Netherlands; Jesper Hospes; Michel Mulder; Stefan Groothuis	1:21.29	
6	Heerenveen, Netherlands	12 March	Netherlands; Ronald Mulder; Jesper Hospes; Kai Verbij; Stefan Groothuis	1:20.40	Canada; Gilmore Junio; William Dutton; Alexandre St-Jean; Vincent De Haître	1:20.41	Russia; Ruslan Murashov; Aleksey Yesin; Kirill Golubev; Denis Yuskov	1:20.86	

Note: the races are over 3 laps.

== Standings ==
#	Country	CGY	SLC	HVN1	HVN2	Total
1	Netherlands	100	70	70	150	390
2	Russia	70	80	80	104	334
3	Canada	0	100	100	120	320
4	Poland	45	40	50	90	225
5	United States	80	45	—		125
6	China	0	60	60		120
7	Japan	60	0	—		60
8	Germany	—	50	—		50
9	Kazakhstan	50	—	—		50
10	South Korea	—	0	45		45
11	Norway	—	—	40		40
12	Belarus	—	—	35		35
13	Italy	—	0	—		0
