= 2015–16 ISU Speed Skating World Cup – World Cup 4 – Men's 1000 metres =

The men's 1000 metres race of the 2015–16 ISU Speed Skating World Cup 4, arranged in the Thialf arena in Heerenveen, Netherlands, was held on 12 December 2015.

Pavel Kulizhnikov of Russia won the race, while his compatriot Denis Yuskov came second, and Kjeld Nuis of the Netherlands came third. Jonathan Garcia of the United States won the Division B race.

== Results ==
The race took place on Saturday, 12 December, with Division B scheduled in the morning session, at 10:31, and Division A scheduled in the afternoon session, at 17:18.

=== Division A ===
Rank	Name	Nat.	Pair	Lane	Time	WC points	GWC points
1st place, gold medalist(s)	Pavel Kulizhnikov	(Russia)	9	i	1:08.16	100	100
2nd place, silver medalist(s)	Denis Yuskov	(Russia)	6	i	1:08.59	80	80
3rd place, bronze medalist(s)	Kjeld Nuis	(Netherlands)	10	i	1:08.61	70	70
4	Shani Davis	(United States)	8	o	1:08.66	60	60
5	Aleksey Yesin	(Russia)	7	i	1:08.76	50	50
6	Joey Mantia	(United States)	9	o	1:08.88	45	—
7	Kai Verbij	(Netherlands)	8	i	1:08.98	40	
8	Gerben Jorritsma	(Netherlands)	10	o	1:09.01	36	
9	Thomas Krol	(Netherlands)	6	o	1:09.18	32	
10	Vincent De Haître	(Canada)	7	o	1:09.44	28	
11	Alexandre St-Jean	(Canada)	5	i	1:09.46	24	
12	Mika Poutala	(Finland)	5	o	1:09.64	21	
13	Denis Kuzin	(Kazakhstan)	3	o	1:09.92	18	
14	Kim Tae-yun	(South Korea)	4	i	1:09.96	16	
15	Kirill Golubev	(Russia)	3	i	1:10:00	14	
16	Kim Jin-su	(South Korea)	4	o	1:10:02	12	
17	Mo Tae-bum	(South Korea)	1	o	1:10.08	10	
18	Gilmore Junio	(Canada)	2	o	1:10.37	8	
19	Piotr Michalski	(Poland)	2	i	1:10.62	6	
20	Konrad Niedźwiedzki	(Poland)	1	i	1:23.48	5	

=== Division B ===
Rank	Name	Nat.	Pair	Lane	Time	WC points
1	Jonathan Garcia	(United States)	14	o	1:09.67	25
2	Nico Ihle	(Germany)	13	o	1:10.331	19
3	Stefan Groothuis	(Netherlands)	11	i	1:10.332	15
4	Yang Fan	(China)	9	i	1:10.42	11
5	Taro Kondo	(Japan)	10	i	1:10.69	8
6	Jan Szymański	(Poland)	9	o	1:10.75	6
7	Konrád Nagy	(Hungary)	7	i	1:11.100	4
8	Tian Guojun	(China)	12	i	1:11.109	2
9	Hubert Hirschbichler	(Germany)	10	o	1:11.16	1
10	Jang Won-hoon	(South Korea)	13	i	1:11.17	—
11	Tsukasa Owada	(Japan)	7	o	1:11.62	
12	Mirko Giacomo Nenzi	(Italy)	8	i	1:11.66	
13	Roman Krech	(Kazakhstan)	14	i	1:11.74	
14	Mathias Vosté	(Belgium)	5	o	1:11.79	
15	Christoffer Fagerli Rukke	(Norway)	4	o	1:12.03	
16	Jan Daldossi	(Italy)	5	i	1:12.09	
17	Sebastian Klosinski	(Poland)	3	o	1:12.10	
18	Aleksander Waagenes	(Norway)	2	o	1:12.15	
19	Joel Dufter	(Germany)	12	o	1:12.30	
20	David Bosa	(Italy)	11	o	1:12.37	
21	Marten Liiv	(Estonia)	3	i	1:12.39	
22	Henrik Fagerli Rukke	(Norway)	1	o	1:12.455	
23	Wang Chaoyu	(China)	2	i	1:12.457	
24	Christian Oberbichler	(Switzerland)	4	i	1:12.90	
25	David Andersson	(Sweden)	8	o	1:12.92	
26	Magnus Myhren Kristensen	(Norway)	1	i	1:13.04	
27	Pedro Causil	(Colombia)	6	o	1:13.16	
28	Daniel Greig	(Australia)	6	i	1:17.06	
