= 2015–16 ISU Speed Skating World Cup – World Cup 3 – Men's 1000 metres =

The men's 1000 metres race of the 2015–16 ISU Speed Skating World Cup 3, arranged in Eisstadion Inzell, in Inzell, Germany, was held on 5 December 2015.

Kjeld Nuis of the Netherlands won the race, while Denis Yuskov of Russia came second, and Kai Verbij of the Netherlands came third. Gilmore Junio of Canada won the Division B race.

== Results ==
The race took place on Saturday, 5 December, with Division B scheduled in the morning session, at 09:30, and Division A scheduled in the afternoon session, at 14:00.

=== Division A ===
Rank	Name	Nat.	Pair	Lane	Time	WC points	GWC points
1st place, gold medalist(s)	Kjeld Nuis	(Netherlands)	9	i	1:08.31	100	100
2nd place, silver medalist(s)	Denis Yuskov	(Russia)	3	i	1:08.55	80	80
3rd place, bronze medalist(s)	Kai Verbij	(Netherlands)	7	i	1:08.60	70	70
4	Joey Mantia	(United States)	8	i	1:08.81	60	60
5	Thomas Krol	(Netherlands)	6	i	1:08.93	50	50
6	Aleksey Yesin	(Russia)	7	o	1:08.96	45	—
7	Kim Tae-yun	(South Korea)	2	o	1:08.97	40	
8	Kim Jin-su	(South Korea)	2	i	1:09.18	36	
9	Alexandre St-Jean	(Canada)	5	o	1:09.19	32	
10	Gerben Jorritsma	(Netherlands)	10	o	1:09.26	28	
11	Shani Davis	(United States)	9	o	1:09.49	24	
12	Vincent De Haître	(Canada)	8	o	1:09.50	21	
13	Kirill Golubev	(Russia)	6	o	1:09.80	18	
14	Espen Aarnes Hvammen	(Norway)	3	o	1:09.85	16	
15	Denis Kuzin	(Kazakhstan)	5	i	1:09.96	14	
16	Jonathan Garcia	(United States)	1	o	1:09.97	12	
17	Jang Won-hoon	(South Korea)	1	i	1:10.08	10	
18	Roman Krech	(Kazakhstan)	4	o	1:10.24	8	
19	Piotr Michalski	(Poland)	4	i	1:10.42	6	
20	Pavel Kulizhnikov	(Russia)	10	i	DNS		

=== Division B ===
Rank	Name	Nat.	Pair	Lane	Time	WC points
1	Gilmore Junio	(Canada)	14	i	1:09.95	25
2	Konrad Niedźwiedzki	(Poland)	12	i	1:10.12	19
3	Mo Tae-bum	(South Korea)	5	o	1:10.27	15
4	Lennart Velema	(Netherlands)	4	i	1:10.35	11
5	Tian Guojun	(China)	10	i	1:10.59	8
6	David Bosa	(Italy)	8	i	1:10.68	6
7	Taro Kondo	(Japan)	13	i	1:10.75	4
8	Yang Fan	(China)	14	o	1:10.92	2
9	Xie Jiaxuan	(China)	12	o	1:10.93	1
10	Mirko Giacomo Nenzi	(Italy)	11	i	1:10.94	—
11	Sebastian Klosinski	(Poland)	8	o	1:11.20	
12	Daniel Greig	(Australia)	9	i	1:11.22	
13	Tsukasa Owada	(Japan)	10	o	1:11.35	
14	Konrád Nagy	(Hungary)	11	o	1:11.370	
15	Joel Dufter	(Germany)	16	o	1:11.375	
16	William Dutton	(Canada)	15	o	1:11.51	
17	Christoffer Fagerli Rukke	(Norway)	4	o	1:11.571	
18	Jeffrey Swider-Peltz	(United States)	3	o	1:11.572	
19	Johann Jørgen Sæves	(Norway)	2	o	1:11.59	
20	Jan Daldossi	(Italy)	7	o	1:11.65	
21	Mu Zhongsheng	(China)	3	i	1:11.94	
22	Sindre Henriksen	(Norway)	13	o	1:11.95	
23	Pedro Causil	(Colombia)	7	i	1:12.06	
24	Mathias Vosté	(Belgium)	6	i	1:12.17	
25	Christian Oberbichler	(Switzerland)	6	o	1:12.73	
26	Juho Vaittinen	(Finland)	5	i	1:13.37	
27	Verneri Kinnunen	(Finland)	1	i	1:14.01	
28	Zbigniew Bródka	(Poland)	9	o	DNF	
29	Hubert Hirschbichler	(Germany)	15	i	DQ	
29	Nico Ihle	(Germany)	16	i	DQ	
29	Marten Liiv	(Estonia)	2	i	DQ	
