= 2015–16 ISU Speed Skating World Cup – World Cup 4 =

The fourth competition weekend of the 2015–16 ISU Speed Skating World Cup was held in the Thialf arena in Heerenveen, Netherlands, from Friday, 11 December, until Sunday, 13 December 2015.

There were no world records over the weekend. Multiple winners were Pavel Kulizhnikov of Russia, who won one of the men's 500 m races and the 1000 m race, and Sven Kramer of the Netherlands, who won the men's 5000 m race and the team pursuit.

== Schedule ==
The detailed schedule of events:

Date	Session	Events	Comment
Friday, 11 December	Afternoon	12:45: 3000 m women 13:40: 500 m women (1); 14:00: 500 m men (1)	Division B
Friday, 11 December	Evening	15:55: 3000 m women 16:59: 500 m women (1); 17:22: 500 m men (1)	Division A
Friday, 11 December	Evening	18:12: Team pursuit men 19:14: Team sprint women 19:29: Team sprint men	
Saturday, 12 December	Morning	10:00: 1000 m women 10:31: 1000 m men 11:32: 5000 m men	Division B
Saturday, 12 December	Afternoon	14:00: 1000 m women 14:46: 5000 m men	Division A
Saturday, 12 December	Afternoon	16:40: Team pursuit women	
Saturday, 12 December	Afternoon	17:18: 1000 m men	Division A
Sunday, 13 December	Morning	09:45: 1500 m women 10:45: 1500 m men 11:54: 500 m women (2); 12:15: 500 m men (2)	Division B
Sunday, 13 December	Afternoon	14:00: 1500 m women 14:54: 1500 m men 15:47: 500 m women (2); 16:27: 500 m men (2); 17:07: Mass start women 17:27: Mass start men	Division A
Sunday, 13 December	Afternoon	17:45: Mass start women 18:05: Mass start men	Division B

All times are CET (UTC+1).

== Medal summary ==
=== Men's events ===
Event	Race #	Gold	Time	Silver	Time	Bronze	Time	Report
500 m	1	Pavel Kulizhnikov; Russia	34.48	Aleksey Yesin; Russia	34.65	Alex Boisvert-Lacroix; Canada	34.78	
500 m	2	Ruslan Murashov; Russia	34.67	Alex Boisvert-Lacroix; Canada	34.76	Espen Aarnes Hvammen; Norway	34.86	
1000 m		Pavel Kulizhnikov; Russia	1:08:16	Denis Yuskov; Russia	1:08:59	Kjeld Nuis; Netherlands	1:08.61	
1500 m		Joey Mantia; United States	1:44.26	Denis Yuskov; Russia	1:44.38	Kjeld Nuis; Netherlands	1:45.33	
5000 m		Sven Kramer; Netherlands	6:14.99	Jorrit Bergsma; Netherlands	6:16.41	Bart Swings; Belgium	6:20.80	
Mass start		Arjan Stroetinga; Netherlands	63 ^{A}	Fabio Francolini; Italy	40 ^{A}	Lee Seung-hoon; South Korea	20 ^{A}	
Team pursuit		Netherlands; Sven Kramer; Jorrit Bergsma; Jan Blokhuijsen	3:43.77	Norway; Sverre Lunde Pedersen; Håvard Bøkko; Sindre Henriksen	3:44.66	Russia; Danil Sinitsyn; Aleksandr Rumyantsev; Sergey Gryaztsov	3:46.24	
Team sprint		Canada; Gilmore Junio; Alexandre St-Jean; Vincent De Haître	1:19.75	Russia; Ruslan Murashov; Aleksey Yesin; Kirill Golubev	1:21.27	Netherlands; Jesper Hospes; Michel Mulder; Stefan Groothuis	1:21.29	

^{A} In mass start, race points are accumulated during the race. The skater with most race points is the winner.

=== Women's events ===
Event	Race #	Gold	Time	Silver	Time	Bronze	Time	Report
500 m	1	Lee Sang-hwa; South Korea	37.59	Brittany Bowe; United States	37.86	Heather Richardson-Bergsma; United States	37.93	
500 m	2	Yu Jing; China	37.84	Heather Richardson-Bergsma; United States	37.87	Zhang Hong; China	37.90	
1000 m		Brittany Bowe; United States	1:14.49	Heather Richardson-Bergsma; United States	1:15.33	Marrit Leenstra; Netherlands	1:15.77	
1500 m		Heather Richardson-Bergsma; United States	1:55.29	Brittany Bowe; United States	1:55.44	Marrit Leenstra; Netherlands	1:56.12	
3000 m		Martina Sáblíková; Czech Republic	4:03.50	Annouk van der Weijden; Netherlands	4:05.39	Olga Graf; Russia	4:06.57	
Mass start		Misaki Oshigiri; Japan	65 ^{A}	Carien Kleibeuker; Netherlands	43 ^{A}	Ivanie Blondin; Canada	20 ^{A}	
Team pursuit		Japan; Ayaka Kikuchi; Nana Takagi; Miho Takagi	2:59.58	Netherlands; Marrit Leenstra; Antoinette de Jong; Linda de Vries	3:01.26	Poland; Natalia Czerwonka; Katarzyna Woźniak; Luiza Złotkowska	3:01.51	
Team sprint		Netherlands; Floor van den Brandt; Janine Smit; Margot Boer	1:29.23	Russia; Yekaterina Shikhova; Nadezhda Aseyeva; Olga Fatkulina	1:29.64	No bronze medalist team		

^{A} In mass start, race points are accumulated during the race. The skater with most race points is the winner.

== Standings ==
The top ten standings in the contested cups after the weekend. The top five nations in the team pursuit and team sprint cups.

=== Men's cups ===
500 m

#	Name	Nat.	CGY1	CGY2	SLC1	SLC2	INZ1	INZ2	HVN1	HVN2	Total
1	Pavel Kulizhnikov	(Russia)	100	100	100	100			100	5	505
2	Alex Boisvert-Lacroix	(Canada)	25	70	40	28	32	80	70	80	425
3	Artur Waś	(Poland)	40	12	8	50	70	100	60	18	358
4	William Dutton	(Canada)	70	80	70	80	8	16	10	6	340
5	Mika Poutala	(Finland)	80	36	36	60		50	45	32	339
6	Gilmore Junio	(Canada)	19	60	28	18	100	60	24	18	327
7	Laurent Dubreuil	(Canada)	36	45	14	70	60	32	18	50	325
8	Kai Verbij	(Netherlands)	16	21	60	12	16	70	50	40	285
9	Ruslan Murashov	(Russia)	50	8	5	40	24	8	40	100	275
10	Alexandre St-Jean	(Canada)	11	6	25	36	80	12	14	60	244

1000 m

#	Name	Nat.	CGY	SLC	INZ	HVN1	Total
1	Kjeld Nuis	(Netherlands)	70	80	100	70	320
2	Pavel Kulizhnikov	(Russia)	80	100		100	280
3	Gerben Jorritsma	(Netherlands)	100	70	28	36	234
4	Joey Mantia	(United States)	60	40	60	45	205
5	Kai Verbij	(Netherlands)	40	45	70	40	195
6	Shani Davis	(United States)	50	60	24	60	194
7	Denis Yuskov	(Russia)		25	80	80	185
8	Aleksey Yesin	(Russia)	45	32	45	50	172
9	Vincent De Haître	(Canada)	36	50	21	28	135
10	Thomas Krol	(Netherlands)	18	28	50	32	128

1500 m

#	Name	Nat.	CGY	SLC	INZ	HVN1	Total
1	Joey Mantia	(United States)	70	80	70	100	320
2	Kjeld Nuis	(Netherlands)	60	100	80	70	310
3	Denis Yuskov	(Russia)	100		100	80	280
4	Thomas Krol	(Netherlands)	45	28	60	60	193
5	Bart Swings	(Belgium)	80	50		50	180
6	Sverre Lunde Pedersen	(Norway)	40	60	32	45	177
7	Shani Davis	(United States)	36	70	18	36	160
8	Jan Szymański	(Poland)	24	32	45	40	141
9	Håvard Bøkko	(Norway)	21	45	40	28	134
10	Konrad Niedźwiedzki	(Poland)	50	12	50		112

5k/10k

#	Name	Nat.	CGY	SLC	INZ	HVN1	Total
1	Jorrit Bergsma	(Netherlands)	80	70	100	80	330
2	Sven Kramer	(Netherlands)	100	80		100	280
3	Sverre Lunde Pedersen	(Norway)	40	25	80	60	205
4	Patrick Beckert	(Germany)	60	60	40	35	195
5	Ted-Jan Bloemen	(Canada)	70	100			170
5	Bart Swings	(Belgium)	50	50		70	170
7	Erik Jan Kooiman	(Netherlands)	35	40	45	40	160
8	Peter Michael	(New Zealand)	32	45	50	25	152
9	Douwe de Vries	(Netherlands)	45		60	45	150
10	Arjan Stroetinga	(Canada)		27	70	30	127

Mass start

#	Name	Nat.	CGY	SLC	INZ	HVN1	Total
1	Arjan Stroetinga	(Netherlands)	50	100	50	100	300
2	Fabio Francolini	(Italy)	28	80	70	80	258
3	Jorrit Bergsma	(Netherlands)	80	40	80	36	236
4	Bart Swings	(Belgium)	100	70		60	230
5	Alexis Contin	(France)		60	100	50	210
6	Reyon Kay	(New Zealand)	70	16	40	18	144
7	Lee Seung-hoon	(South Korea)		28	25	70	123
8	Jordan Belchos	(Canada)	21	18	32	40	111
9	Peter Michael	(New Zealand)	40	32	28	8	108
10	Viktor Hald Thorup	(Denmark)	25	50	14	14	103

Team pursuit

#	Country	CGY	INZ	HVN1	Total
1	Netherlands		100	100	200
1	South Korea	80	60	60	200
3	Poland	60	70	45	175
4	Italy	70	50	50	170
5	Norway		80	80	160

Team sprint

#	Country	CGY	SLC	HVN1	Total
1	Netherlands	100	70	70	240
2	Russia	70	80	80	230
3	Canada		100	100	200
4	Poland	45	40	50	135
5	United States	80	45		125

Grand World Cup

#	Name	Nat.	CGY	SLC	INZ	HVN1	Total
1	Kjeld Nuis	(Netherlands)	130	180	180	140	630
2	Bart Swings	(Belgium)	230	170		180	580
3	Pavel Kulizhnikov	(Russia)	180	200		150	530
4	Jorrit Bergsma	(Netherlands)	160	70	180	80	490
5	Joey Mantia	(United States)	130	80	130	100	440
5	Dennis Yuskov	(Russia)	100		180	160	440
7	Arjan Stroetinga	(Netherlands)	50	100	120	100	370
8	Sven Kramer	(Netherlands)	100	80		100	280
9	Alexis Contin	(France)		60	100	100	260
10	Shani Davis	(United States)	50	130		60	240

=== Women's cups ===
500 m

#	Name	Nat.	CGY1	CGY2	SLC1	SLC2	INZ1	INZ2	HVN1	HVN2	Total
1	Lee Sang-hwa	(South Korea)	100	80	60	80	100	100	100	60	680
2	Heather Richardson-Bergsma	(United States)	60	70	70	60	70	80	70	80	560
3	Zhang Hong	(China)	80	100	100	100			60	70	510
4	Brittany Bowe	(United States)	70	60	80	70	80		80		440
5	Vanessa Bittner	(Austria)	50	36	45	21	50	50	45	40	337
6	Yu Jing	(China)	45	50	50	50			36	100	331
7	Heather McLean	(Canada)	19	28	16	45	60	70	32	28	298
8	Olga Fatkulina	(Russia)	28	21	32	40	45	18	50	45	279
9	Erina Kamiya	(Japan)	36	40	21	28	36	60	21	18	260
8	Maki Tsuji	(Japan)	40	32	28	36	24	36	16	24	236

1000 m

#	Name	Nat.	CGY	SLC	INZ	HVN1	Total
1	Brittany Bowe	(United States)	80	100	100	100	380
2	Heather Richardson-Bergsma	(United States)	100	70	80	80	330
3	Marrit Leenstra	(Netherlands)	45	60	50	70	225
4	Zhang Hong	(China)	70	80		45	195
5	Vanessa Bittner	(Austria)	50	40	40	60	190
6	Li Qishi	(China)	25	50	60	24	159
7	Olga Fatkulina	(Russia)	24	45	28	40	137
8	Ida Njåtun	(Norway)	40	8	45	36	129
9	Karolína Erbanová	(Czech Republic)	36	21	18	50	125
10	Miho Takagi	(Japan)	11	28	32	28	99

1500 m

#	Name	Nat.	CGY	SLC	INZ	HVN1	Total
1	Brittany Bowe	(United States)	100	80	100	80	360
1	Heather Richardson-Bergsma	(United States)	80	100	80	100	360
3	Marrit Leenstra	(Netherlands)	50	60	70	70	250
3	Martina Sáblíková	(Czech Republic)	70	70	50	60	250
5	Ida Njåtun	(Norway)	60	50	60	45	215
6	Marije Joling	(Netherlands)	45	28	40	40	153
7	Miho Takagi	(Japan)	25	32	45	50	152
8	Ayaka Kikuchi	(Japan)	21	40	36	32	129
8	Misaki Oshigiri	(Japan)	28	45	28	28	129
10	Antoinette de Jong	(Netherlands)	36	36	18	36	126

3k/5k

#	Name	Nat.	CGY	SLC	INZ	HVN1	Total
1	Martina Sáblíková	(Czech Republic)	100	100	100	100	400
2	Natalya Voronina	(Russia)	70	80	50	50	250
3	Irene Schouten	(Netherlands)	80	50	25	60	215
4	Olga Graf	(Russia)	30	40	70	70	210
5	Marije Joling	(Netherlands)	45		80	45	170
6	Ivanie Blondin	(Canada)	40	70	30	25	165
7	Claudia Pechstein	(Germany)	35	60	35	30	160
8	Jorien Voorhuis	(Netherlands)	60		60	35	155
9	Annouk van der Weijden	(Netherlands)	50		21	80	151
10	Yvonne Nauta	(Netherlands)	12	30	45	40	136

Mass start

#	Name	Nat.	CGY	SLC	INZ	HVN1	Total
1	Irene Schouten	(Netherlands)	80	100	100	36	316
2	Ivanie Blondin	(Canada)	70	80	80	70	300
3	Misaki Oshigiri	(Japan)	25	70		100	195
4	Janneke Ensing	(Netherlands)	32	60	40	25	157
5	Park Do-yeong	(South Korea)	40	19	70	21	150
6	Heather Richardson-Bergsma	(United States)	50	28	45	24	147
7	Luiza Złotkowska	(Poland)	11	50	32	40	133
8	Martina Sáblíková	(Czech Republic)	60		60	5	125
9	Miho Takagi	(Japan)	36	16	28	45	125
10	Carien Kleibeuker	(Netherlands)		11	25	80	116
10	Liu Jing	(China)	14	40	50	12	116

Team pursuit

#	Country	CGY	INZ	HVN1	Total
1	Japan	80	100	100	280
2	Netherlands	100	80	80	260
3	Russia	70	70	60	200
4	Poland	35	60	70	165
5	Canada	60	45	50	155

Team sprint

#	Country	CGY	SLC	HVN1	Total
1	Netherlands	60	50	100	210
2	China	80	100		180
3	Japan	100	70		170
4	Russia		80	80	160
5	Canada	70	60		130

Grand World Cup

#	Name	Nat.	CGY	SLC	INZ	HVN1	Total
1	Heather Richardson-Bergsma	(United States)	295	235	235	255	1020
2	Brittany Bowe	(United States)	245	255	240	220	960
3	Martina Sáblíková	(Czech Republic)	230	170	210	160	770
4	Irene Schouten	(Netherlands)	160	150	100	60	470
5	Marrit Leenstra	(Netherlands)	50	120	120	140	430
6	Lee Sang-hwa	(South Korea)	90	70	170	80	410
7	Zhang Hong	(China)	160	180		65	405
8	Ivanie Blondin	(Canada)	70	150	80	70	370
9	Natalya Voronina	(Russia)	70	80	50	50	250
10	Vanessa Bittner	(Austria)	75	75	50	120	245
