= 2015–16 ISU Speed Skating World Cup – World Cup 2 – Men's team sprint =

The men's team sprint race of the 2015–16 ISU Speed Skating World Cup 2, arranged in the Utah Olympic Oval, in Salt Lake City, United States, was held on November 22, 2015.

The Canadian team won the race on a new world record, which was held by the Dutch team, and only established the previous weekend. The Russian team came second, and the Dutch team came third.

== Results ==
The race took place on Sunday, November 22, in the afternoon session, scheduled at 15:47.

Rank	Country	Skaters	Pair	Lane	Time	WC points
1st place, gold medalist(s)	Canada	William Dutton; Alexandre St-Jean; Vincent De Haître	2	f	1:17.75 WR	100
2nd place, silver medalist(s)	Russia	Artyom Kuznetsov; Aleksey Yesin; Kirill Golubev	4	f	1:19.12 NR	80
3rd place, bronze medalist(s)	Netherlands	Stefan Groothuis; Hein Otterspeer; Kai Verbij	5	f	1:19.20	70
4	China	Xie Jiaxuan; Mu Zhongsheng; Yang Fan	3	c	1:19.32 NR	60
5	Germany	Joel Dufter; Nico Ihle; Hubert Hirschbichler	1	c	1:20.42 NR	50
6	United States	Kimani Griffin; Jonathan Garcia; Joey Mantia	5	c	1:20.84	45
7	Poland	Artur Waś; Artur Nogal; Piotr Michalski	3	f	1:20.97 NR	40
8	Italy	Jan Daldossi; David Bosa; Mirko Giacomo Nenzi	2	c	DQ	
8	Japan	Taro Kondo; Takuro Oda; Daichi Yamanaka	4	c	DQ	
8	South Korea	Kim Jun-ho; Kim Tae-yun; Jang Won-hoon	1	f	DQ	

Note: WR = world record, NR = national record.
