= 2015–16 ISU Speed Skating World Cup – World Cup 4 – Men's 1500 metres =

The men's 1500 metres race of the 2015–16 ISU Speed Skating World Cup 4, arranged in the Thialf arena in Heerenveen, Netherlands, was held on 13 December 2015.

Joey Mantia of the United States won the race, while Denis Yuskov of Russia came second, and Kjeld Nuis of the Netherlands came third. Jeffrey Swider-Peltz of the United States won the Division B race.

== Results ==
The race took place on Sunday, 13 December, with Division B scheduled in the morning session, at 10:45, and Division A scheduled in the afternoon session, at 14:54.

=== Division A ===
Rank	Name	Nat.	Pair	Lane	Time	WC points	GWC points
1st place, gold medalist(s)	Joey Mantia	(United States)	10	o	1:44.26	100	100
2nd place, silver medalist(s)	Denis Yuskov	(Russia)	9	i	1:44.38	80	80
3rd place, bronze medalist(s)	Kjeld Nuis	(Netherlands)	10	i	1:45.33	70	70
4	Thomas Krol	(Netherlands)	9	o	1:45.54	60	60
5	Bart Swings	(Belgium)	8	o	1:45.55	50	50
6	Sverre Lunde Pedersen	(Norway)	8	i	1:45.86	45	—
7	Jan Szymański	(Poland)	6	i	1:46.02	40	
8	Shani Davis	(United States)	7	i	1:46.08	36	
9	Vincent De Haître	(Canada)	6	o	1:46.19	32	
10	Håvard Bøkko	(Norway)	7	o	1:46.83	28	
11	Peter Michael	(New Zealand)	2	i	1:46.89	24	
12	Sergey Trofimov	(Russia)	3	i	1:47.13	21	
13	Andrea Giovannini	(Italy)	2	o	1:47.36	18	
14	Sindre Henriksen	(Norway)	5	o	1:47.66	16	
15	Takuro Oda	(Japan)	4	o	1:47.67	14	
16	Joo Hyung-joon	(South Korea)	4	i	1:47.81	12	
17	Jan Blokhuijsen	(Netherlands)	3	o	1:47.95	10	
18	Kirill Golubev	(Russia)	5	i	1:48.07	8	
19	Kim Jin-su	(South Korea)	1	i	1:50.68	6	
20	Gerben Jorritsma	(Netherlands)	—	—	WDR		
21	Konrad Niedźwiedzki	(Poland)	—	—	WDR		

=== Division B ===
Rank	Name	Nat.	Pair	Lane	Time	WC points
1	Jeffrey Swider-Peltz	(United States)	8	o	1:48.71	25
2	Sergey Gryaztsov	(Russia)	13	o	1:48.95	19
3	Denis Kuzin	(Kazakhstan)	8	i	1:49.02	15
4	Jonathan Garcia	(United States)	1	o	1:49.15	11
5	Danil Sinitsyn	(Russia)	10	i	1:49.27	8
6	Olivier Jean	(Canada)	6	o	1:49.37	6
7	Alexis Contin	(France)	9	o	1:49.59	4
8	Zbigniew Bródka	(Poland)	12	o	1:49.68	2
9	Hubert Hirschbichler	(Germany)	5	i	1:49.75	1
10	Yang Fan	(China)	9	i	1:50.02	—
11	Konrád Nagy	(Hungary)	11	i	1:50.03	
12	Linus Heidegger	(Austria)	4	o	1:50.37	
13	Piotr Puszkarski	(Poland)	5	o	1:50.45	
14	Patrick Roest	(Netherlands)	3	i	1:50.74	
15	Dmitry Babenko	(Kazakhstan)	7	o	1:50.82	
16	Aleksander Waagenes	(Norway)	10	o	1:50.91	
17	Vitaly Mikhailov	(Belarus)	12	i	1:50.92	
18	Mathias Vosté	(Belgium)	3	o	1:50.94	
19	Sebastian Klosinski	(Poland)	7	i	1:51.02	
20	Tian Guojun	(China)	1	i	1:51.03	
21	Viktor Hald Thorup	(Denmark)	4	i	1:51.11	
22	Kim Min-seok	(South Korea)	6	i	1:51.49	
23	Kim Cheol-min	(South Korea)	11	o	1:51.82	
24	Marten Liiv	(Estonia)	2	i	1:52.98	
25	Verneri Kinnunen	(Finland)	2	o	1:54.33	
26	Jan Blokhuijsen	(Netherlands)	—	—	DNS	
27	Stefan Waples	(Canada)	—	—	WDR	
27	David Andersson	(Sweden)	—	—	WDR	
27	Livio Wenger	(Switzerland)	—	—	WDR	
