= World record progression team sprint speed skating men =

The world record progression of the men's team sprint as recognised by the International Skating Union:

Team sprint was first introduced on the calendar of the 2015-16 World Cup. It is part of the European Championships since 2018 and the World Single Distances Speed Skating Championships of 2018-19. Official results are recorded since the 2015-2016 skating season. The first World Cup with a team sprint event was on November 14, 2015, a race that was won by the team from the Netherlands. The first official World Record was recognised by ISU at the Calgary World Cup on December 1, 2017.

Nr	Nation	Names	Result	Date	Venue	Meeting
1*	NED	Ronald Mulder; Kai Verbeij; Stefan Groothuis	1:18.79	14 November 2015	Calgary	World Cup
2*	CAN	William Dutton; Alexandre St-Jean; Vincent De Haître	1:17.75	22 November 2015	Salt Lake City	World Cup
3	CAN	Gilmore Junio; Laurent Dubreuil; Vincent De Haître	1:17.31	1 December 2017	Calgary	World Cup
4	NED	Janno Botman; Jenning de Boo; Tim Prins	1:17.175	15 February 2024	Calgary	World Championship
5	CAN	Antoine Gélinas-Beaulieu; Laurent Dubreuil; Anders Johnson	1:17.173	15 February 2024	Calgary	World Championship
6	USA	Cooper McLeod; Austin Kleba; Zach Stoppelmoor	1:16.98	26 January 2025	Calgary	World Cup

* Unofficial world record
