= 2015–16 ISU Speed Skating World Cup – World Cup 2 – Men's 1500 metres =

The men's 1500 metres race of the 2015–16 ISU Speed Skating World Cup 2, arranged in the Utah Olympic Oval, in Salt Lake City, United States, was held on November 20, 2015.

Kjeld Nuis of the Netherlands won the race, while Joey Mantia of the United States came second, and Shani Davis of the United States came third. Takuro Oda of Japan won the Division B race.

== Results ==
The race took place on Friday, November 20, in the afternoon session, with Division A scheduled at 15:15, and Division B scheduled at 16:52.

=== Division A ===
Rank	Name	Nat.	Pair	Lane	Time	WC points	GWC points
1st place, gold medalist(s)	Kjeld Nuis	(Netherlands)	9	o	1:42.14 NR	100	100
2nd place, silver medalist(s)	Joey Mantia	(United States)	9	i	1:42.45	80	80
3rd place, bronze medalist(s)	Shani Davis	(United States)	7	o	1:42.90	70	70
4	Sverre Lunde Pedersen	(Norway)	7	i	1:43.08	60	60
5	Bart Swings	(Belgium)	10	o	1:43.81	50	50
6	Håvard Bøkko	(Norway)	5	o	1:44.25	45	—
7	Li Bailin	(China)	6	o	1:44.31 NR	40	
8	Gerben Jorritsma	(Netherlands)	6	i	1:44.43	36	
9	Jan Szymański	(Poland)	5	i	1:44.46	32	
10	Thomas Krol	(Netherlands)	8	o	1:44.54	28	
11	Joo Hyung-joon	(South Korea)	4	o	1:44.550	24	
12	Vincent De Haître	(Canada)	2	o	1:44.556	21	
13	Sindre Henriksen	(Norway)	3	o	1:44.66	18	
14	Kirill Golubev	(Russia)	4	i	1:44.91	16	
15	Sergey Trofimov	(Russia)	3	i	1:45.24	14	
16	Konrad Niedźwiedzki	(Poland)	8	i	1:45.36	12	
17	Haralds Silovs	(Latvia)	2	i	1:45.76	10	
18	Vitaly Mikhailov	(Belarus)	1	o	1:46.13	8	
19	Alexis Contin	(France)	1	i	1:47.72	6	
20	Denis Yuskov	(Russia)	10	i	DQ		

Note: NR = national record.

=== Division B ===
Rank	Name	Nat.	Pair	Lane	Time	WC points
1	Takuro Oda	(Japan)	2	o	1:45.11	25
2	Jan Blokhuijsen	(Netherlands)	8	i	1:45.37	19
3	Sergey Gryaztsov	(Russia)	11	o	1:45.59	15
4	David Andersson	(Sweden)	9	o	1:45.61	11
5	Kim Cheol-min	(South Korea)	13	o	1:45.79	8
6	Konrád Nagy	(Hungary)	15	o	1:45.90	6
7	Zbigniew Bródka	(Poland)	14	i	1:46.10	4
8	Andrea Giovannini	(Italy)	12	i	1:46.43	2
9	Sebastian Klosinski	(Poland)	10	o	1:46.45	1
10	Jeffrey Swider-Peltz	(United States)	11	i	1:46.47	—
11	Wouter olde Heuvel	(Netherlands)	15	i	1:46.48	
12	Benjamin Donnelly	(Canada)	5	i	1:46.66	
13	Yang Fan	(China)	14	o	1:46.73	
14	Dmitry Babenko	(Kazakhstan)	10	i	1:46.83	
15	Kim Min-seok	(South Korea)	3	o	1:46.87 NRJ	
16	Denis Kuzin	(Kazakhstan)	13	i	1:47.22	
17	Hubert Hirschbichler	(Germany)	2	i	1:47.25	
18	Piotr Puszkarski	(Poland)	8	o	1:47.44	
19	Reyon Kay	(New Zealand)	5	o	1:47.48	
20	Livio Wenger	(Switzerland)	6	o	1:47.53 NR	
21	Linus Heidegger	(Austria)	6	i	1:48.22	
22	Viktor Hald Thorup	(Denmark)	7	i	1:48.33	
23	K. C. Boutiette	(United States)	1	o	1:48.74	
24	Martin Corbett	(Canada)	7	o	1:48.75	
25	Kimani Griffin	(United States)	4	i	1:49.25	
26	Mathias Vosté	(Belgium)	4	o	1:51.36	
27	Iñigo Vidondo	(Spain)	3	i	1:52.14	
28	Armin Hager	(Austria)	1	i	1:52.73	
29	Kim Jin-su	(South Korea)	12	o	DNF	
30	Olivier Jean	(Canada)	9	i	DQ	

Note: NR = national record, NRJ = national record for juniors.
