= 2015–16 ISU Speed Skating World Cup – World Cup 3 – Men's 1500 metres =

The men's 1500 metres race of the 2015–16 ISU Speed Skating World Cup 3, arranged in Eisstadion Inzell, in Inzell, Germany, was held on 6 December 2015.

Denis Yuskov of Russia won the race, while Kjeld Nuis of the Netherlands came second, and Joey Mantia of the United States came third. Peter Michael of New Zealand won the Division B race.

== Results ==
The race took place on Sunday, 6 December, with Division B scheduled in the morning session, at 11:41, and Division A scheduled in the afternoon session, at 14:53.

=== Division A ===
Rank	Name	Nat.	Pair	Lane	Time	WC points	GWC points
1st place, gold medalist(s)	Denis Yuskov	(Russia)	9	o	1:44.21	100	100
2nd place, silver medalist(s)	Kjeld Nuis	(Netherlands)	10	i	1:45.20	80	80
3rd place, bronze medalist(s)	Joey Mantia	(United States)	10	o	1:45.25	70	70
4	Thomas Krol	(Netherlands)	8	o	1:45.52	60	60
5	Konrad Niedźwiedzki	(Poland)	6	i	1:46.36	50	50
6	Jan Szymański	(Poland)	6	o	1:46.39	45	—
7	Håvard Bøkko	(Norway)	7	o	1:46.41	40	
8	Gerben Jorritsma	(Netherlands)	7	i	1:46.44	36	
9	Sverre Lunde Pedersen	(Norway)	8	i	1:46.48	32	
10	Haralds Silovs	(Latvia)	2	i	1:46.54	28	
11	Vincent De Haître	(Canada)	4	i	1:47.21	24	
12	Takuro Oda	(Japan)	3	o	1:47.21	21	
13	Shani Davis	(United States)	9	i	1:47.36	18	
14	Sindre Henriksen	(Norway)	4	o	1:47.68	16	
15	Kirill Golubev	(Russia)	5	o	1:47.80	14	
16	Sergey Gryaztsov	(Russia)	1	o	1:48.19	12	
17	Sergey Trofimov	(Russia)	3	i	1:48.29	10	
18	Jan Blokhuijsen	(Netherlands)	2	o	1:48.49	8	
19	Vitaly Mikhailov	(Belarus)	1	i	1:52.04	6	
20	Joo Hyung-joon	(South Korea)	5	i	2:13.73	5	

=== Division B ===
Rank	Name	Nat.	Pair	Lane	Time	WC points
1	Peter Michael	(New Zealand)	5	o	1:47.33	25
2	Andrea Giovannini	(Italy)	12	i	1:47.95	19
3	Kim Jin-su	(South Korea)	11	o	1:48.16	15
4	Zbigniew Bródka	(Poland)	14	o	1:48.17	11
5	Danil Sinitsyn	(Russia)	7	o	1:48.46	8
6	Aleksander Waagenes	(Norway)	5	i	1:48.53	6
7	Konrád Nagy	(Hungary)	14	i	1:48.61	4
8	Jeffrey Swider-Peltz	(United States)	11	i	1:48.70	2
9	Kim Cheol-min	(South Korea)	13	i	1:48.86	1
10	Dmitry Babenko	(Kazakhstan)	10	i	1:49.03	—
11	Kim Min-seok	(South Korea)	10	o	1:49.17	
12	Yang Fan	(China)	13	o	1:49.24	
13	Hubert Hirschbichler	(Germany)	9	o	1:49.26	
14	Olivier Jean	(Canada)	9	i	1:49.45	
15	Patrick Roest	(Netherlands)	6	i	1:49.62	
16	Sun Longjiang	(China)	4	o	1:49.76	
17	Joel Dufter	(Germany)	6	o	1:49.96	
18	Mathias Vosté	(Belgium)	8	o	1:50.04	
19	Moritz Geisreiter	(Germany)	3	i	1:50.33	
20	Jonas Pflug	(Germany)	2	o	1:50.41	
21	Sebastian Klosinski	(Poland)	12	o	1:50.53	
22	Marten Liiv	(Estonia)	2	i	1:51.87	
23	Ian Quinn	(United States)	3	o	1:52.05	
24	Viktor Hald Thorup	(Denmark)	8	i	1:52.10	
25	Iñigo Vidondo	(Spain)	7	i	1:52.91	
26	Aleksander Puszkarski	(Poland)	4	i	1:53.24	
27	Verneri Kinnunen	(Finland)	1	i	1:54.95	
