= 2015–16 ISU Speed Skating World Cup – World Cup 1 – Men's team sprint =

The men's team sprint race of the 2015–16 ISU Speed Skating World Cup 1, arranged in the Olympic Oval, in Calgary, Alberta, Canada, will be held on 14 November 2015.

The Dutch team won the race, while the American team came second, and the Russian team came third. As this was the first time the event was skated as an official ISU competition, the winning time automatically became the world record. The rest of the results became national records.

== Results ==
The race will take place on Saturday, 14 November, in the afternoon session, scheduled at 15:54.

Rank	Country	Skaters	Pair	Lane	Time	WC points
1st place, gold medalist(s)	Netherlands	Ronald Mulder; Kai Verbij; Stefan Groothuis	4	f	1:18.79 WR	100
2nd place, silver medalist(s)	United States	Mitchell Whitmore; Jonathan Garcia; Joey Mantia	3	c	1:19.39 NR	80
3rd place, bronze medalist(s)	Russia	Ruslan Murashov; Artyom Kuznetsov; Aleksey Yesin	3	f	1:19.59 NR	70
4	Japan	Tsubasa Hasegawa; Daichi Yamanaka; Taro Kondo	1	c	1:20.84 NR	60
5	Kazakhstan	Aleksandr Zhigin; Fyodor Mezentsev; Denis Kuzin	1	f	1:21.30 NR	50
6	Poland	Artur Waś; Artur Nogal; Piotr Michalski	2	f	1:21:47 NR	45
7	Canada	William Dutton; Laurent Dubreuil; Vincent De Haître	4	c	DQ	
7	China	Xie Jiaxuan; Mu Zhongsheng; Yang Fan	2	c	DQ	

Note: WR = world record, NR = national record.
