= 2015 World Allround Speed Skating Championships – Men =

Men at the 2015 World Allround Speed Skating Championships
- Date: 7–8 March 2015
- Competitors: 24 from 14 nations
- Winning points: 146.510

Medalists
gold medal	Sven Kramer	Netherlands
silver medal	Denis Yuskov	Russia
bronze medal	Sverre Lunde Pedersen	Norway

The Men event of the 2015 World Allround Speed Skating Championships was held on 7–8 March 2015.

== Results ==
=== 500 m ===
The race was started at 12:33.

Rank	Pair	Lane	Name	Country	Time	Diff
1	9	i	Denny Morrison	CAN	34.98	
2	12	o	Denis Yuskov	RUS	35.64	+0.66
3	11	i	Zbigniew Bródka	POL	35.78	+0.80
4	7	o	Sverre Lunde Pedersen	NOR	35.87	+0.89
5	12	i	Håvard Bøkko	NOR	35.91	+0.93
6	5	i	Konrad Niedźwiedzki	POL	35.93	+0.95
7	11	o	Jan Szymański	POL	35.97	+0.99
8	6	i	Kim Cheol-min	KOR	36.04	+1.06
9	7	i	Sergey Gryaztsov	RUS	36.17	+1.19
10	8	i	Sven Kramer	NED	36.20	+1.22
10	8	o	Haralds Silovs	LAT	36.20	+1.22
12	1	i	Lee Seung-hoon	KOR	36.34	+1.36
13	10	o	Shane Williamson	JPN	36.47	+1.49
14	9	o	Simen Spieler Nilsen	NOR	36.50	+1.52
15	2	i	Bram Smallenbroek	AUT	36.57	+1.59
15	4	i	Andrea Giovannini	ITA	36.57	+1.59
15	2	o	Alexis Contin	FRA	36.57	+1.59
18	6	o	Danil Sinitsyn	RUS	36.59	+1.61
18	3	i	Konrád Nagy	HUN	36.59	+1.61
20	4	o	Douwe de Vries	NED	36.63	+1.65
21	5	o	Bart Swings	BEL	36.70	+1.72
22	3	o	Ted-Jan Bloemen	CAN	37.03	+2.05
23	1	o	Patrick Beckert	GER	37.77	+2.79
	10	i	Koen Verweij	NED	DNF	

=== 5000 m ===
The race was started at 14:50.

Rank	Pair	Lane	Name	Country	Time	Diff
1	11	i	Sven Kramer	NED	6:07.49	
2	9	o	Sverre Lunde Pedersen	NOR	6:11.77	+4.28
3	10	i	Denis Yuskov	RUS	6:13.64	+6.15
4	9	i	Alexis Contin	FRA	6:15.02	+7.53
5	7	o	Bart Swings	BEL	6:15.42	+7.93
6	12	i	Patrick Beckert	GER	6:16.60	+9.11
7	10	o	Douwe de Vries	NED	6:17.81	+10.32
8	12	o	Ted-Jan Bloemen	CAN	6:22.40	+14.91
9	6	o	Andrea Giovannini	ITA	6:23.62	+16.13
10	1	o	Simen Spieler Nilsen	NOR	6:24.69	+17.20
11	3	o	Denny Morrison	CAN	6:25.01	+17.52
12	5	i	Konrad Niedźwiedzki	POL	6:25.09	+17.60
13	2	o	Haralds Silovs	LAT	6:25.22	+17.73
14	8	o	Håvard Bøkko	NOR	6:25.79	+18.30
15	11	o	Lee Seung-hoon	KOR	6:26.91	+19.42
16	4	o	Zbigniew Bródka	POL	6:27.79	+20.30
17	2	i	Sergey Gryaztsov	RUS	6:28.37	+20.88
18	1	i	Bram Smallenbroek	AUT	6:31.33	+23.84
19	7	i	Shane Williamson	JPN	6:34.92	+27.43
20	3	i	Kim Cheol-min	KOR	6:36.46	+28.97
21	4	i	Konrád Nagy	HUN	6:40.61	+33.12
22	6	i	Jan Szymański	POL	6:44.92	+37.43
	5	o	Danil Sinitsyn	RUS	DSQ	
	8	i	Koen Verweij	NED	DNS	

=== 1500 m ===
The race was started at 12:01.

Rank	Pair	Lane	Name	Country	Time	Diff
1	12	o	Denis Yuskov	RUS	1:42.92	
2	11	i	Sverre Lunde Pedersen	NOR	1:43.99	+1.07
3	10	o	Bart Swings	BEL	1:44.18	+1.26
3	12	i	Sven Kramer	NED	1:44.18	+1.26
5	11	o	Denny Morrison	CAN	1:44.35	+1.43
6	8	o	Zbigniew Bródka	POL	1:44.98	+2.06
7	9	o	Konrad Niedźwiedzki	POL	1:45.27	+2.35
8	7	i	Haralds Silovs	LAT	1:45.71	+2.79
9	5	i	Lee Seung-hoon	KOR	1:45.93	+3.01
10	6	o	Sergey Gryaztsov	RUS	1:45.95	+3.03
11	2	o	Konrád Nagy	HUN	1:46.04	+3.12
12	10	i	Alexis Contin	FRA	1:46.28	+3.36
13	8	i	Håvard Bøkko	NOR	1:46.45	+3.53
14	9	i	Douwe de Vries	NED	1:46.79	+3.87
15	4	i	Patrick Beckert	GER	1:46.81	+3.89
16	2	i	Jan Szymański	POL	1:46.82	+3.90
17	5	o	Ted-Jan Bloemen	CAN	1:46.89	+3.97
17	3	i	Bram Smallenbroek	AUT	1:46.89	+3.97
19	6	i	Simen Spieler Nilsen	NOR	1:47.08	+4.16
20	7	o	Andrea Giovannini	ITA	1:47.78	+4.86
21	3	o	Shane Williamson	JPN	1:47.89	+4.97
22	4	o	Kim Cheol-min	KOR	1:48.35	+5.43
23	1	i	Danil Sinitsyn	RUS	1:49.70	+6.78

=== 10000 m ===
The race was started at 13:57.

Rank	Pair	Lane	Name	Country	Time	Diff
1	3	i	Sven Kramer	NED	12:56.70	
2	2	i	Alexis Contin	FRA	13:04.80	+8.11
3	2	o	Bart Swings	BEL	13:06.62	+9.93
4	3	o	Sverre Lunde Pedersen	NOR	13:09.46	+12.76
5	4	i	Denis Yuskov	RUS	13:12.49	+15.80
6	1	i	Douwe de Vries	NED	13:17.64	+20.95
7	1	o	Konrad Niedźwiedzki	POL	13:42.86	+46.17
8	4	o	Denny Morrison	CAN	13:54.90	+58.21

=== Overall standings ===
After all events.

Rank	Name	Country	Points	Diff
1st place, gold medalist(s)	Sven Kramer	NED	146.509	
2nd place, silver medalist(s)	Denis Yuskov	RUS	146.934	+0.43
3rd place, bronze medalist(s)	Sverre Lunde Pedersen	NOR	147.182	+0.68
4	Bart Swings	BEL	148.299	+1.79
5	Alexis Contin	FRA	148.738	+2.23
6	Douwe de Vries	NED	149.889	+3.38
7	Denny Morrison	CAN	150.009	+3.50
8	Konrad Niedźwiedzki	POL	150.672	+4.17
9	Zbigniew Bródka	POL	109.552	
10	Haralds Silovs	LAT	109.958	
11	Håvard Bøkko	NOR	109.972	
12	Sergey Gryaztsov	RUS	110.323	
13	Lee Seung-hoon	KOR	110.341	
14	Simen Spieler Nilsen	NOR	110.662	
15	Andrea Giovannini	ITA	110.858	
16	Ted-Jan Bloemen	CAN	110.900	
17	Patrick Beckert	GER	111.033	
18	Bram Smallenbroek	AUT	111.333	
19	Kim Cheol-min	KOR	111.802	
20	Shane Williamson	JPN	111.925	
21	Konrád Nagy	HUN	111.997	
22	Jan Szymański	POL	112.068	
	Danil Sinitsyn	RUS		
	Koen Verweij	NED		
