= 2015–16 ISU Speed Skating World Cup – World Cup 4 – Men's team sprint =

The men's team sprint race of the 2015–16 ISU Speed Skating World Cup 4, arranged in the Thialf arena in Heerenveen, Netherlands, was held on 11 December 2015.

The Canadian team won the race, with the Russian team in second place, and the Dutch team in third.

== Results ==
The race took place on Friday, 11 December, in the evening session, scheduled at 19:29.

Rank	Country	Skaters	Pair	Lane	Time	WC points
1st place, gold medalist(s)	Canada	Gilmore Junio; Alexandre St-Jean; Vincent De Haître	2	f	1:19.75	100
2nd place, silver medalist(s)	Russia	Ruslan Murashov; Aleksey Yesin; Kirill Golubev	4	c	1:21.27	80
3rd place, bronze medalist(s)	Netherlands	Jesper Hospes; Michel Mulder; Stefan Groothuis	4	f	1:21.29	70
4	China	Xie Jiaxuan; Mu Zhongsheng; Yang Fan	3	f	1:21.40	60
5	Poland	Artur Nogal; Piotr Michalski; Sebastian Klosinski	3	c	1:22.00	50
6	South Korea	Kim Jun-ho; Kim Tae-yun; Jang Won-hoon	2	c	1:22.02 NR	45
7	Norway	Henrik Fagerli Rukke; Espen Aarnes Hvammen; Christoffer Fagerli Rukke	1	f	1:24.39 NR	40
8	Belarus	Maksim Kondratyev; Artyom Chaban; Vitaly Mikhailov	1	c	1:24.63 NR	35

Note: NR = national record.
