= Short-track speed skating at the 2011 Canada Winter Games =

Short track speed skating at the 2011 Canada Winter Games was held at the St. Margaret's Centre in Upper Tantallon, Nova Scotia.

The events will be held during the first week between February 13 and 17, 2011.

The seating capacity for these games will be 1,000 spectators.

== Men ==
Event	Gold		Silver		Bronze	
500 m	Alexandre St-Jean; Quebec	43.308	Andrew Evans; New Brunswick	43.633	Evan Brideau; New Brunswick	44.043
1000 m	Maxime Gauthier; Quebec	1:29.033	Yoan Gauthier; Quebec	1:29.663	Charles Evans; New Brunswick	1:32.015
1500 m	Maxime Gauthier; Quebec	2:29.139	Benoît Thériault; Quebec	2:29.500	Yoan Gauthier; Quebec	2:30.777
1500 m Super	Maxime Gauthier; Quebec	2:17.183	Alexandre St-Jean; Quebec	2:18.369	Yoan Gauthier; Quebec	2:18.463
3000 m relay	Alexandre St-Jean; Maxime Gauthier; Benoît Thériault; Jonathan Perez-Audy; Yoan Gauthier; Quebec	4:18.311	Julien Collin-Demers; Vincent De Haître; Dan Carruthers; Oliver Gervais; Kevin Ryu Sun; Ontario	4:19.632	Evan Brideau; Andrew Evans; Charles Evans; Jeff Retallick; Devin Patterson; New Brunswick	4:21.438

== Women ==
Event	Gold		Silver		Bronze	
500 m	Courtney Shmyr; British Columbia	46.409	Cynthia Mascitto; Quebec	46.515	Elisabeth Albert; Quebec	46.683
1000 m	Ann-Véronique Michaud; Quebec	1:36.521	Namasthée Harris-Gauthier; Quebec	1:36.648	Elisabeth Albert; Quebec	1:37.522
1500 m	Ann-Véronique Michaud; Quebec	2:37.178	Namasthée Harris-Gauthier; Quebec	2:38.124	Courtney Shmyr; British Columbia	2:38.282
1500 m Super	Ann-Véronique Michaud; Quebec	2:31.149	Namasthée Harris-Gauthier; Quebec	2:31.561	Courtney Shmyr; British Columbia	2:31.970
3000 m relay	Cynthia Mascitto; Ann-Véronique Michaud; Elisabeth Albert; Namasthée Harris-Gauthier; Jessica Santos-Bouffard; Quebec	4:32.466	Courtney Shmyr; Michelle MacKay; Jesse Keca; Jamie MacDonald; Robyn Kempers; British Columbia	4:34.517	Stephanie Bowskill; Keri Morrison; Hannah Morrison; Taylor Schmidt; Gabrielle St-Germain; Ontario	4:43.612
