= 2015–16 ISU Speed Skating World Cup – World Cup 4 – Men's 500 metres =

The men's 500 metres races of the 2015–16 ISU Speed Skating World Cup 4, arranged in the Thialf arena in Heerenveen, Netherlands, were held on 11 and 13 December 2015.

Pavel Kulizhnikov of Russia won race one, while his compatriot Aleksey Yesin came second, and Alex Boisvert-Lacroix of Canada came third. Espen Aarnes Hvammen of Norway won the first Division B race.

Ruslan Murashov of Russia won race two, with Boisvert-Lacroix in second place, and Hvammen in third. Denis Koval of Russia won the second Division B race.

== Race 1 ==
Race one took place on Friday, 11 December, with Division B scheduled in the afternoon session, at 14:00, and Division A scheduled in the evening session, at 17:22.

=== Division A ===
Rank	Name	Nat.	Pair	Lane	Time	WC points	GWC points
1st place, gold medalist(s)	Pavel Kulizhnikov	(Russia)	10	i	34.48	100	50
2nd place, silver medalist(s)	Aleksey Yesin	(Russia)	3	i	34.65	80	40
3rd place, bronze medalist(s)	Alex Boisvert-Lacroix	(Canada)	8	i	34.78	70	35
4	Artur Waś	(Poland)	9	o	34.80	60	30
5	Kai Verbij	(Netherlands)	7	o	34.86	50	25
6	Mika Poutala	(Finland)	8	o	34.90	45	—
7	Ruslan Murashov	(Russia)	4	i	34.96	40	
8	Tsubasa Hasegawa	(Japan)	2	o	34.97	36	
9	Mo Tae-bum	(South Korea)	2	i	35.03	32	
10	Roman Krech	(Kazakhstan)	3	o	35.04	28	
11	Gilmore Junio	(Canada)	9	i	35.09	24	
12	Ryohei Haga	(Japan)	5	i	35.12	21	
13	Laurent Dubreuil	(Canada)	7	i	35.13	18	
14	Hein Otterspeer	(Netherlands)	5	o	35.19	16	
15	Alexandre St-Jean	(Canada)	6	i	35.23	14	
16	Jesper Hospes	(Netherlands)	1	o	35.28	12	
17	William Dutton	(Canada)	10	o	35.30	10	
18	Yūya Oikawa	(Japan)	6	o	35.37	8	
19	Michel Mulder	(Netherlands)	1	i	35.48	6	
20	Joji Kato	(Japan)	4	o	35.68	5	

=== Division B ===
Rank	Name	Nat.	Pair	Lane	Time	WC points
1	Espen Aarnes Hvammen	(Norway)	15	o	35.16	25
2	Artyom Kuznetsov	(Russia)	14	i	35.22	19
3	Nico Ihle	(Germany)	11	i	35.27	15
4	Denis Koval	(Russia)	7	i	35.33	11
5	David Bosa	(Italy)	13	i	35.43	8
6	Pekka Koskela	(Finland)	10	o	35.49	6
7	Piotr Michalski	(Poland)	9	o	35.51	4
8	Xie Jiaxuan	(China)	10	i	35.522	2
9	Mirko Giacomo Nenzi	(Italy)	9	i	35.527	1
10	Jan Smeekens	(Netherlands)	15	i	35.54	—
11	Kim Tae-yun	(South Korea)	14	o	35.55	
12	Tsukasa Owada	(Japan)	7	o	35.61	
13	Lee Kang-seok	(South Korea)	11	o	35.640	
14	Artur Nogal	(Poland)	13	o	35.647	
15	Mu Zhongsheng	(China)	12	i	35.68	
16	Jonathan Garcia	(United States)	8	i	35.72	
17	Daniel Greig	(Australia)	6	o	35.74	
18	Liu An	(China)	6	i	35.76	
19	Wang Chaoyu	(China)	3	i	35.88	
20	Kim Jun-ho	(South Korea)	12	o	36.03	
21	Christian Oberbichler	(Switzerland)	5	o	36.18	
22	Joel Dufter	(Germany)	5	i	36.19	
23	Henrik Fagerli Rukke	(Norway)	1	i	36.37	
24	David Andersson	(Sweden)	4	o	36.38	
25	Marten Liiv	(Estonia)	3	o	36.56	
26	Harri Levo	(Finland)	4	i	36.63	
27	Denis Kuzin	(Kazakhstan)	2	o	36.73	
28	Artyom Chaban	(Belarus)	2	i	36.93	
29	Sung Ching-yang	(Chinese Taipei)	8	o	DQ	

== Race 2 ==
Race two took place on Sunday, 13 December, with Division B scheduled in the morning session, at 12:15, and Division A scheduled in the afternoon session, at 16:27.

=== Division A ===
Rank	Name	Nat.	Pair	Lane	Time	WC points	GWC points
1st place, gold medalist(s)	Ruslan Murashov	(Russia)	5	i	34.67	100	50
2nd place, silver medalist(s)	Alex Boisvert-Lacroix	(Canada)	10	o	34.76	80	40
3rd place, bronze medalist(s)	Espen Aarnes Hvammen	(Norway)	3	i	34.86	70	35
4	Alexandre St-Jean	(Canada)	6	o	34.87	60	30
5	Laurent Dubreuil	(Canada)	7	i	34.90	50	25
6	Aleksey Yesin	(Russia)	6	i	34.97	45	—
7	Kai Verbij	(Netherlands)	7	o	34.981	40	
8	Jan Smeekens	(Netherlands)	3	o	34.984	36	
9	Mika Poutala	(Finland)	8	o	35.01	32	
10	Hein Otterspeer	(Netherlands)	4	o	35.09	28	
11	Ryohei Haga	(Japan)	5	o	35.12	24	
12	Roman Krech	(Kazakhstan)	2	o	35.17	21	
13	Gilmore Junio	(Canada)	8	i	35.183	18	
13	Artur Waś	(Poland)	9	i	35.183	18	
15	Yūya Oikawa	(Japan)	4	i	35.22	14	
16	Kim Tae-yun	(South Korea)	1	i	35.28	12	
17	Artyom Kuznetsov	(Russia)	2	i	35.29	10	
18	Nico Ihle	(Germany)	1	o	35.30	8	
19	William Dutton	(Canada)	9	o	35.44	6	
20	Pavel Kulizhnikov	(Russia)	10	i	1:26.89	5	
21	Joji Kato	(Japan)	—	—	WDR	—	

=== Division B ===
Rank	Name	Nat.	Pair	Lane	Time	WC points
1	Denis Koval	(Russia)	9	o	35.17	25
2	Piotr Michalski	(Poland)	8	i	35.20	19
3	Mo Tae-bum	(South Korea)	13	i	35.23	15
4	Jonathan Garcia	(United States)	7	o	35.29	11
5	David Bosa	(Italy)	13	o	35.33	8
6	Jesper Hospes	(Netherlands)	9	i	35.35	6
7	Pekka Koskela	(Finland)	10	i	35.37	4
8	Tsubasa Hasegawa	(Japan)	12	i	35.41	2
9	Artur Nogal	(Poland)	12	o	35.44	1
10	Michel Mulder	(Netherlands)	7	i	35.475	—
11	Mirko Giacomo Nenzi	(Italy)	8	o	35.476	
12	Daniel Greig	(Australia)	5	o	35.50	
13	Liu An	(China)	5	i	35.56	
14	Xie Jiaxuan	(China)	10	o	35.57	
15	Tsukasa Owada	(Japan)	6	o	35.59	
16	Mu Zhongsheng	(China)	11	i	35.68	
17	Kim Jun-ho	(South Korea)	11	o	35.77	
18	Sung Ching-yang	(Chinese Taipei)	6	i	35.82	
19	Christian Oberbichler	(Switzerland)	4	o	36.05	
20	Wang Chaoyu	(China)	3	i	36.08	
21	Henrik Fagerli Rukke	(Norway)	2	i	36.09	
22	Joel Dufter	(Germany)	4	i	36.22	
23	Harri Levo	(Finland)	3	o	36.30	
24	Denis Kuzin	(Kazakhstan)	1	i	36.46	
25	Artyom Chaban	(Belarus)	2	o	36.84	
26	David Andersson	(Sweden)	—	—	WDR	
26	Hubert Hirschbichler	(Germany)	—	—	WDR	
