= 2019 World Single Distances Speed Skating Championships – Men's mass start =

Men's mass start at the 2019 World Single Distances Speed Skating Championships
- Venue: Max Aicher Arena
- Location: Inzell, Germany
- Dates: 10 February
- Competitors: 24 from 16 nations
- Winning points: 60

Medalists
gold medal	Joey Mantia	United States
silver medal	Um Cheon-ho	South Korea
bronze medal	Chung Jae-won	South Korea

The Men's mass start competition at the 2019 World Single Distances Speed Skating Championships was held on 10 February 2019.

== Results ==
The race was started at 16:30.

Rank	Name	Country	Time	Points
1st place, gold medalist(s)	Joey Mantia	United States	7:35.66	60
2nd place, silver medalist(s)	Um Cheon-ho	South Korea	7:36.11	40
3rd place, bronze medalist(s)	Chung Jae-won	South Korea	7:36.30	21
4	Andrea Giovannini	Italy	7:36.64	12
5	Seitaro Ichinohe	Japan	7:37.40	6
6	Peter Michael	New Zealand	7:49.43	6
7	Livio Wenger	Switzerland	7:37.44	3
7	Danila Semerikov	Russia	7:37.44	3
9	Haralds Silovs	Latvia	7:38.48	3
10	Felix Maly	Germany	8:02.37	2
11	Bart Swings	Belgium	9:25.26	2
12	Ning Zhongyan	China	7:49.67	1
13	Chris Huizinga	Netherlands	8:05.00	1
14	Douwe de Vries	Netherlands	7:39.71	
15	Daniel Niero	Italy	7:40.57	
16	Vitaly Mikhailov	Belarus	7:40.59	
17	Shane Williamson	Japan	7:41.44	
18	Ma Xinxuan	China	7:42.50	
19	Zbigniew Bródka	Poland	7:46.68	
20	Stefan Due Schmidt	Denmark	7:50.89	
21	Aliaksei Kirpichnik	Belarus	8:15.22	
22	Ruslan Zakharov	Russia	8:49.68	
23	Viktor Hald Thorup	Denmark	7:55.50	
24	Jess Neufeld	Canada	9:21.64	
