= 2015–16 ISU Speed Skating World Cup – World Cup 4 – Men's team pursuit =

The men's team pursuit race of the 2015–16 ISU Speed Skating World Cup 4, arranged in the Thialf arena in Heerenveen, Netherlands, was held on 11 December 2015.

The Dutch team won the race, with the Norwegian team in second place, and the Russian team in third.

== Results ==
The race took place on Friday, 11 December, in the evening session, scheduled at 18:12.

Rank	Country	Skaters	Pair	Lane	Time	WC points
1st place, gold medalist(s)	Netherlands	Sven Kramer; Jorrit Bergsma; Jan Blokhuijsen	5	c	3:43.77	100
2nd place, silver medalist(s)	Norway	Sverre Lunde Pedersen; Håvard Bøkko; Sindre Henriksen	3	f	3:44.66	80
3rd place, bronze medalist(s)	Russia	Danil Sinitsyn; Aleksandr Rumyantsev; Sergey Gryaztsov	2	f	3:46.24	70
4	South Korea	Lee Seung-hoon; Joo Hyung-joon; Kim Cheol-min	6	f	3:46.34	60
5	Italy	Andrea Giovannini; Luca Stefani; Nicola Tumolero	5	f	3:46.74	50
6	Poland	Zbigniew Bródka; Konrad Niedźwiedzki; Jan Szymański	6	c	3:48.11	45
7	Japan	Shota Nakamura; Shane Williamson; Ryousuke Tsuchiya	3	c	3:48.21	40
8	Canada	Jordan Belchos; Olivier Jean; Stefan Waples	4	f	3:48.93	35
9	United States	Joey Mantia; Jeffrey Swider-Peltz; K. C. Boutiette	2	c	3:49.29	30
10	Germany	Moritz Geisreiter; Hubert Hirschbichler; Jonas Pflug	4	c	3:54.15	25
11	Switzerland	Livio Wenger; Martin Hänggi; Christian Oberbichler	1	f	4:04.83	21
