= 2015–16 ISU Speed Skating World Cup – World Cup 4 – Women's 1000 metres =

The women's 1000 metres race of the 2015–16 ISU Speed Skating World Cup 4, arranged in the Thialf arena in Heerenveen, Netherlands, was held on 12 December 2015.

Brittany Bowe of the United States won the race, while compatriot Heather Richardson-Bergsma came second, and Marrit Leenstra of the Netherlands came third. Kaylin Irvine of Canada won the Division B race.

== Results ==
The race took place on Saturday, 12 December, with Division B scheduled in the morning session, at 10:00, and Division A scheduled in the afternoon session, at 14:00.

=== Division A ===
Rank	Name	Nat.	Pair	Lane	Time	WC points	GWC points
1st place, gold medalist(s)	Brittany Bowe	(United States)	10	i	1:14.59	100	100
2nd place, silver medalist(s)	Heather Richardson-Bergsma	(United States)	10	o	1:15.33	80	80
3rd place, bronze medalist(s)	Marrit Leenstra	(Netherlands)	9	i	1:15.77	70	70
4	Vanessa Bittner	(Austria)	8	o	1:16.09	60	60
5	Karolína Erbanová	(Czech Republic)	6	o	1:16.19	50	50
6	Zhang Hong	(China)	9	o	1:16.28	45	—
7	Olga Fatkulina	(Russia)	7	i	1:16.29	40	
8	Ida Njåtun	(Norway)	7	o	1:16.36	36	
9	Yekaterina Shikhova	(Russia)	4	o	1:16.56	32	
10	Miho Takagi	(Japan)	5	i	1:16.593	28	
11	Li Qishi	(China)	8	i	1:16.594	24	
12	Sanneke de Neeling	(Netherlands)	5	o	1:16.75	21	
13	Margot Boer	(Netherlands)	6	i	1:16.85	18	
14	Ayaka Kikuchi	(Japan)	3	i	1:17.60	16	
15	Margarita Ryzhova	(Russia)	1	i	1:17.70	14	
16	Maki Tsuji	(Japan)	3	o	1:18.15	12	
17	Erina Kamiya	(Japan)	2	i	1:18.37	10	
18	Gabriele Hirschbichler	(Germany)	4	i	1:18.69	8	
19	Kim Hyun-yung	(South Korea)	2	o	1:20.77	6	
20	Jorien ter Mors	(Netherlands)	—	—	WDR		

=== Division B ===
Rank	Name	Nat.	Pair	Lane	Time	WC points
1	Kaylin Irvine	(Canada)	6	o	1:17.32	25
2	Nao Kodaira	(Japan)	8	o	1:18.02	19
3	Yu Jing	(China)	9	i	1:18.14	15
4	Martina Sáblíková	(Czech Republic)	7	i	1:18.15	11
5	Hege Bøkko	(Norway)	10	i	1:18.21	8
6	Heather McLean	(Canada)	6	i	1:18.72	6
7	Yekaterina Aydova	(Kazakhstan)	9	o	1:19.12	4
8	Paige Schwartzburg	(United States)	5	o	1:19.15	2
9	Kim Min-sun	(South Korea)	5	i	1:19.18	1
10	Roxanne Dufter	(Germany)	10	o	1:19.30	—
11	Sugar Todd	(United States)	7	o	1:19.85	
12	Nadezhda Aseyeva	(Russia)	8	i	1:19.90	
13	Ellen Bjertnes	(Norway)	3	o	1:20.27	
14	Li Huawei	(China)	2	i	1:20.70	
15	Ksenia Sadovskaya	(Belarus)	2	o	1:21.57	
16	Elina Risku	(Finland)	4	o	1:21.78	
17	Yvonne Daldossi	(Italy)	3	i	1:22.10	
18	Yuliya Kozyreva	(Russia)	1	i	1:23.13	
19	Marsha Hudey	(Canada)	4	i	DQ	
