= 2015–16 ISU Speed Skating World Cup – World Cup 4 – Women's 1500 metres =

The women's 1500 metres race of the 2015–16 ISU Speed Skating World Cup 4, arranged in the Thialf arena in Heerenveen, Netherlands, was held on 13 December 2015.

Heather Richardson-Bergsma of the United States won the race, while compatriot Brittany Bowe came second, and Marrit Leenstra of the Netherlands came third. Natalia Czerwonka of Poland won the Division B race.

== Results ==
The race took place on Sunday, 13 December, with Division B scheduled in the morning session, at 09:45, and Division A scheduled in the afternoon session, at 14:00.

=== Division A ===
Rank	Name	Nat.	Pair	Lane	Time	WC points	GWC points
1st place, gold medalist(s)	Heather Richardson-Bergsma	(United States)	10	o	1:55.29	100	100
2nd place, silver medalist(s)	Brittany Bowe	(United States)	10	i	1:55.44	80	80
3rd place, bronze medalist(s)	Marrit Leenstra	(Netherlands)	9	o	1:56.12	70	70
4	Martina Sáblíková	(Czech Republic)	9	i	1:56.72	60	60
5	Miho Takagi	(Japan)	7	i	1:57.03	50	50
6	Ida Njåtun	(Norway)	8	i	1:57.34	45	—
7	Marije Joling	(Netherlands)	8	o	1:57.99	40	
8	Antoinette de Jong	(Netherlands)	6	o	1:58.00	36	
9	Ayaka Kikuchi	(Japan)	6	i	1:58.07	32	
10	Misaki Oshigiri	(Japan)	7	o	1:58.49	28	
11	Sanneke de Neeling	(Netherlands)	5	o	1:58.55	24	
12	Yekaterina Shikhova	(Russia)	3	i	1:58.76	21	
13	Diane Valkenburg	(Netherlands)	5	i	1:58.83	18	
14	Luiza Złotkowska	(Poland)	1	i	1:59.29	16	
15	Li Qishi	(China)	4	i	1:59.41	14	
16	Kali Christ	(Canada)	2	i	1:59.55	12	
17	Margarita Ryzhova	(Russia)	1	o	1:59.56	10	
18	Natalya Voronina	(Russia)	4	o	1:59.89	8	
19	Hao Jiachen	(China)	3	o	2:01.21	6	
20	Elizaveta Kazelina	(Russia)	2	o	2:01.32	5	

=== Division B ===
Rank	Name	Nat.	Pair	Lane	Time	WC points
1	Natalia Czerwonka	(Poland)	12	i	1:59.48	25
2	Nana Takagi	(Japan)	12	o	2:00.46	19
3	Zhao Xin	(China)	10	i	2:00.88	15
4	Noh Seon-yeong	(South Korea)	9	i	2:00.93	11
5	Gabriele Hirschbichler	(Germany)	11	o	2:00.97	8
6	Paige Schwartzburg	(United States)	10	o	2:01.48	6
7	Roxanne Dufter	(Germany)	11	i	2:01.76	4
8	Brianne Tutt	(Canada)	7	i	2:01.81	2
9	Hege Bøkko	(Norway)	9	o	2:01.95	1
10	Katarzyna Woźniak	(Poland)	8	i	2:02.69	—
11	Liu Jing	(China)	8	o	2:03.13	
12	Nikola Zdráhalová	(Czech Republic)	3	i	2:03.15	
13	Isabelle Weidemann	(Canada)	5	i	2:03.29	
14	Park Ji-woo	(South Korea)	3	o	2:04.12	
15	Saori Toi	(Japan)	6	o	2:04.47	
16	Tatyana Mikhailova	(Belarus)	5	o	2:04.51	
17	Marina Zueva	(Belarus)	4	i	2:04.71	
18	Natálie Kerschbaummayr	(Czech Republic)	2	o	2:04.92	
19	Bente Kraus	(Germany)	2	i	2:04.94	
20	Park Do-yeong	(South Korea)	4	o	2:05.57	
21	Ellen Bjertnes	(Norway)	1	i	2:05.96	
22	Saskia Alusalu	(Estonia)	1	o	2:08.15	
23	Francesca Bettrone	(Italy)	7	o	DQ	
24	Yekaterina Aydova	(Kazakhstan)	6	i	DNS	
