= 2015–16 ISU Speed Skating World Cup – World Cup 4 – Women's team pursuit =

The women's team pursuit race of the 2015–16 ISU Speed Skating World Cup 4, arranged in the Thialf arena in Heerenveen, Netherlands, was held on 12 December 2015.

The Japanese team won the race, while the Dutch team came second, and the Polish team came third.

== Results ==
The race took place on Saturday, 12 December, in the afternoon session, scheduled at 16:40.

Rank	Country	Skaters	Pair	Lane	Time	WC points
1st place, gold medalist(s)	Japan	Ayaka Kikuchi; Nana Takagi; Miho Takagi	4	f	2:59.58	100
2nd place, silver medalist(s)	Netherlands	Marrit Leenstra; Antoinette de Jong; Linda de Vries	4	c	3:01.26	80
3rd place, bronze medalist(s)	Poland	Natalia Czerwonka; Katarzyna Woźniak; Luiza Złotkowska	2	f	3:01.51	70
4	Russia	Natalya Voronina; Elizaveta Kazelina; Olga Graf	3	f	3:03.11	60
5	Canada	Ivanie Blondin; Josie Spence; Isabelle Weidemann	3	c	3:04.17	50
6	Germany	Gabriele Hirschbichler; Bente Kraus; Claudia Pechstein	2	c	3:05.44	45
7	China	Hao Jiachen; Liu Jing; Zhao Xin	1	f	3:05.60	40
8	Czech Republic	Eliška Dřímalová; Nikola Zdráhalová; Natálie Kerschbaummayr	1	c	3:21.92	35
