= 2015–16 ISU Speed Skating World Cup – World Cup 4 – Women's 500 metres =

The women's 500 metres races of the 2015–16 ISU Speed Skating World Cup 4, arranged in the Thialf arena in Heerenveen, Netherlands, were held on 11 and 13 December 2015.

Lee Sang-hwa of South Korea won race one, while Americans Brittany Bowe and Heather Richardson-Bergsma came second and third. Yekaterina Shikhova of Russia won the first Division B race.

Yu Jing of China won race two, with Richardson-Bergsma in second place, and Yu's compatriot Zhang Hong in third. Li Huawei, also of China, won the second Division B race.

== Race 1 ==
Race one took place on Friday, 11 December, with Division B scheduled in the afternoon session, at 13:40, and Division A scheduled in the evening session, at 16:59.

=== Division A ===
Rank	Name	Nat.	Pair	Lane	Time	WC points	GWC points
1st place, gold medalist(s)	Lee Sang-hwa	(South Korea)	10	i	37.59	100	50
2nd place, silver medalist(s)	Brittany Bowe	(United States)	9	o	37.86	80	40
3rd place, bronze medalist(s)	Heather Richardson-Bergsma	(United States)	10	o	37.93	70	35
4	Zhang Hong	(China)	9	i	38.016	60	30
5	Olga Fatkulina	(Russia)	6	o	38.018	50	25
6	Vanessa Bittner	(Austria)	8	i	38.02	45	—
7	Karolína Erbanová	(Czech Republic)	4	i	38.28	40	
8	Yu Jing	(China)	6	i	38.30	36	
9	Heather McLean	(Canada)	8	o	38.37	32	
10	Margot Boer	(Netherlands)	2	i	38.45	28	
11	Jorien ter Mors	(Netherlands)	2	o	38.46	24	
12	Erina Kamiya	(Japan)	7	i	38.474	21	
13	Nao Kodaira	(Japan)	5	i	38.479	18	
14	Maki Tsuji	(Japan)	7	o	38.51	16	
15	Sugar Todd	(United States)	5	o	38.66	14	
16	Marsha Hudey	(Canada)	4	o	38.79	12	
17	Kim Min-sun	(South Korea)	3	i	38.83	10	
18	Floor van den Brandt	(Netherlands)	3	o	38.93	8	
19	Kim Hyun-yung	(South Korea)	1	i	39.01	6	
20	Yvonne Daldossi	(Italy)	1	o	39.29	5	

=== Division B ===
Rank	Name	Nat.	Pair	Lane	Time	WC points
1	Yekaterina Shikhova	(Russia)	5	o	38.74	25
2	Yekaterina Aydova	(Kazakhstan)	8	i	38.91	19
3	Arisa Go	(Japan)	7	o	38.98	15
4	Li Qishi	(China)	6	o	39.10	11
5	Marrit Leenstra	(Netherlands)	6	i	39.11	8
6	Nadezhda Aseyeva	(Russia)	8	o	39.15	6
7	Janine Smit	(Netherlands)	7	i	39.24	4
8	Kaylin Irvine	(Canada)	5	i	39.28	2
9	Li Huawei	(China)	4	o	39.30	1
10	Park Soo-jin	(South Korea)	3	o	39.52	—
11	Elina Risku	(Finland)	3	i	39.64	
12	Zhang Xin	(China)	4	i	39.79	
13	Yuliya Kozyreva	(Russia)	2	o	39.83	
14	Paige Schwartzburg	(United States)	2	i	40.14	
15	Martine Ripsrud	(Norway)	1	o	40.29	
16	Tatyana Mikhailova	(Belarus)	1	i	40.93	

== Race 2 ==
Race two took place on Sunday, 13 December, with Division B scheduled in the morning session, at 11:54, and Division A scheduled in the afternoon session, at 15:47.

=== Division A ===
Rank	Name	Nat.	Pair	Lane	Time	WC points	GWC points
1st place, gold medalist(s)	Yu Jing	(China)	7	o	37.84	100	50
2nd place, silver medalist(s)	Heather Richardson-Bergsma	(United States)	10	o	37.87	80	40
3rd place, bronze medalist(s)	Zhang Hong	(China)	9	i	37.90	70	35
4	Lee Sang-hwa	(South Korea)	10	i	37.985	60	30
5	Jorien ter Mors	(Netherlands)	2	i	37.989	50	25
6	Olga Fatkulina	(Russia)	7	i	38.19	45	—
7	Vanessa Bittner	(Austria)	9	o	38.20	40	
8	Nao Kodaira	(Japan)	5	i	38.26	36	
9	Karolína Erbanová	(Czech Republic)	6	o	38.29	32	
10	Heather McLean	(Canada)	8	i	38.30	28	
11	Maki Tsuji	(Japan)	6	i	38.43	24	
12	Sugar Todd	(United States)	5	o	38.49	21	
13	Erina Kamiya	(Japan)	8	o	38.50	18	
14	Kim Min-sun	(South Korea)	4	o	38.51	16	
15	Margot Boer	(Netherlands)	3	i	38.69	14	
16	Marsha Hudey	(Canada)	4	i	38.73	12	
17	Yekaterina Aydova	(Kazakhstan)	2	o	38.75	10	
18	Yekaterina Shikhova	(Russia)	1	o	38.80	8	
19	Arisa Go	(Japan)	1	i	38.94	6	
20	Floor van den Brandt	(Netherlands)	3	o	38.97	5	

=== Division B ===
Rank	Name	Nat.	Pair	Lane	Time	WC points
1	Li Huawei	(China)	2	i	39.23	25
2	Janine Smit	(Netherlands)	5	i	39.248	19
3	Nadezhda Aseyeva	(Russia)	6	i	39.249	15
4	Kim Hyun-yung	(South Korea)	5	o	39.25	11
5	Kaylin Irvine	(Canada)	4	i	39.36	8
6	Yuliya Kozyreva	(Russia)	6	o	39.44	6
7	Hege Bøkko	(Norway)	3	o	39.481	4
8	Elina Risku	(Finland)	2	o	39.482	2
9	Yvonne Daldossi	(Italy)	4	o	39.58	1
10	Zhang Xin	(China)	3	i	39.68	—
11	Park Soo-jin	(South Korea)	1	i	39.81	
12	Ksenia Sadovskaya	(Belarus)	1	o	40.13	
13	Marrit Leenstra	(Netherlands)	—	—	WDR	
13	Li Qishi	(China)	—	—	WDR	
