= 2015–16 ISU Speed Skating World Cup – World Cup 4 – Women's mass start =

The women's mass start race of the 2015–16 ISU Speed Skating World Cup 4, arranged in the Thialf arena in Heerenveen, Netherlands, was held on 13 December 2015.

Misaki Oshigiri of Japan won the race, while Carien Kleibeuker of the Netherlands came second, and Ivanie Blondin of Canada came third. Janneke Ensing of the Netherlands won the Division B race.

== Results ==
The race took place on Sunday, 13 December, with Division A scheduled at 17:07, and Division B scheduled at 17:45 (both in the afternoon session).

=== Division A ===
				Race points							
Rank	Name	Nat.	Laps	Split 1	Split 2	Split 3	Finish	Total	Time	WC points	GWC points
1st place, gold medalist(s)	Misaki Oshigiri	(Japan)	16			5	60	65	8:22.80	100	100
2nd place, silver medalist(s)	Carien Kleibeuker	(Netherlands)	16			3	40	43	8:23.23	80	80
3rd place, bronze medalist(s)	Ivanie Blondin	(Canada)	16				20	20	8:27.96	70	70
4	Vanessa Bittner	(Austria)	16		5			5	8:30.44	60	60
5	Francesca Bettrone	(Italy)	16	5				5	8:43.71	50	50
6	Miho Takagi	(Japan)	16	3				3	8:31.22	45	—
7	Luiza Złotkowska	(Poland)	16		3			3	9:03.13	40	
8	Irene Schouten	(Netherlands)	16		1			1	8:28.03	36	
9	Hao Jiachen	(China)	16			1		1	8:28.42	32	
10	Josie Spence	(Canada)	16	1				1	8:31.52	28	
11	Heather Richardson-Bergsma	(United States)	16						8:28.20	24	
12	Park Do-young	(South Korea)	16						8:28.47	21	
13	Jelena Peeters	(Belgium)	16						8:29.65	18	
14	Marina Zueva	(Belarus)	16						8:29.66	16	
15	Francesca Lollobrigida	(Italy)	16						8:29.71	14	
16	Liu Jing	(China)	16						8:30.02	12	
17	Park Ji-woo	(South Korea)	16						8:32.67	10	
18	Claudia Pechstein	(Germany)	16						8:37.20	8	
19	Nikola Zdráhalová	(Czech Republic)	16						8:37.21	6	
20	Martina Sáblíková	(Czech Republic)	16						8:53.19	5	

=== Division B ===
				Race points						
Rank	Name	Nat.	Laps	Split 1	Split 2	Split 3	Finish	Total	Time	WC points
1	Janneke Ensing	(Netherlands)	16				60	60	9:05.58	25
2	Erin Bartlett	(United States)	16				40	40	9:06.38	19
3	Paige Schwartzburg	(United States)	16				20	20	9:06.53	15
4	Aleksandra Goss	(Poland)	16	1		5		6	9:10.66	11
5	Katarzyna Woźniak	(Poland)	16	3		3		6	9:11.60	8
6	Bente Kraus	(Germany)	16		5	1		6	9:13.41	6
7	Saskia Alusalu	(Estonia)	16	5				5	9:10.25	4
8	Natalya Voronina	(Russia)	16		3			3	9:08.17	2
9	Tatyana Mikhailova	(Belarus)	16		1			1	9:30.69	1
10	Isabelle Weidemann	(Canada)	16						9:07.52	—
11	Elena Møller-Rigas	(Denmark)	16						9:07.74	
12	Sofie-Karoline Haugen	(Norway)	16						9:14.14	
13	Eliska Drimalova	(Czech Republic)	16						9:14.18	
14	Nana Takagi	(Japan)	16						9:39.53	
15	Noh Seon-yeong	(South Korea)	1						DQ	
