= 2015–16 ISU Speed Skating World Cup – World Cup 4 – Women's 3000 metres =

The women's 3000 metres race of the 2015–16 ISU Speed Skating World Cup 4, arranged in the Thialf arena in Heerenveen, Netherlands, was held on 11 December 2015.

Martina Sáblíková of the Czech Republic won the race, while Annouk van der Weijden of the Netherlands came second, and Olga Graf of Russia came third. Zhao Xin of China won the Division B race.

== Results ==
The race took place on Friday, 11 December, with Division B scheduled in the afternoon session, at 12:45, and Division A scheduled in the evening session, at 15:55.

=== Division A ===
| Rank | Name | Nat. | Pair | Lane | Time | WC points | GWC points |
|---|---|---|---|---|---|---|---|
| 1st place, gold medalist(s) | Martina Sáblíková | (Czech Republic) | 8 | i | 4:03.50 | 100 | 100 |
| 2nd place, silver medalist(s) | Annouk van der Weijden | (Netherlands) | 3 | o | 4:05.39 | 80 | 80 |
| 3rd place, bronze medalist(s) | Olga Graf | (Russia) | 7 | o | 4:06.57 | 70 | 70 |
| 4 | Irene Schouten | (Netherlands) | 7 | i | 4:07.15 | 60 | 60 |
| 5 | Natalya Voronina | (Russia) | 8 | o | 4:07.85 | 50 | 50 |
| 6 | Marije Joling | (Netherlands) | 5 | i | 4:08.01 | 45 | — |
| 7 | Yvonne Nauta | (Netherlands) | 4 | o | 4:08.77 | 40 | |
| 8 | Jorien Voorhuis | (Netherlands) | 5 | o | 4:10.08 | 35 | |
| 9 | Claudia Pechstein | (Germany) | 6 | o | 4:10.43 | 30 | |
| 10 | Ivanie Blondin | (Canada) | 6 | i | 4:11.45 | 25 | |
| 11 | Misaki Oshigiri | (Japan) | 3 | i | 4:12.32 | 21 | |
| 12 | Nana Takagi | (Japan) | 2 | o | 4:13.64 | 18 | |
| 13 | Elizaveta Kazelina | (Russia) | 2 | i | 4:15.46 | 16 | |
| 14 | Francesca Lollobrigida | (Italy) | 1 | o | 4:20.14 | 14 | |
| 15 | Ayaka Kikuchi | (Japan) | 1 | i | DQ | | |
| 15 | Miho Takagi | (Japan) | 4 | i | DQ | | |

=== Division B ===
| Rank | Name | Nat. | Pair | Lane | Time | WC points |
|---|---|---|---|---|---|---|
| 1 | Zhao Xin | (China) | 7 | i | 4:10.70 | 32 |
| 2 | Josie Spence | (Canada) | 7 | o | 4:10.80 | 27 |
| 3 | Ida Njåtun | (Norway) | 10 | i | 4:11.27 | 23 |
| 4 | Luiza Złotkowska | (Poland) | 9 | o | 4:12.35 | 19 |
| 5 | Bente Kraus | (Germany) | 8 | i | 4:13.37 | 15 |
| 6 | Isabelle Weidemann | (Canada) | 11 | i | 4:13.38 | 11 |
| 7 | Fuyo Matsuoka | (Japan) | 10 | o | 4:13.71 | 9 |
| 8 | Katarzyna Woźniak | (Poland) | 6 | i | 4:15.47 | 7 |
| 9 | Marina Zueva | (Belarus) | 9 | i | 4:15.65 | 6 |
| 10 | Hao Jiachen | (China) | 5 | o | 4:15.89 | 5 |
| 11 | Natalia Czerwonka | (Poland) | 4 | i | 4:16.80 | 4 |
| 12 | Nikola Zdráhalová | (Czech Republic) | 3 | i | 4:18.34 | 3 |
| 13 | Liu Jing | (China) | 6 | o | 4:18.61 | 2 |
| 14 | Francesca Bettrone | (Italy) | 4 | o | 4:19.17 | 1 |
| 15 | Jelena Peeters | (Belgium) | 8 | o | 4:19.21 | — |
| 16 | Park Do-yeong | (South Korea) | 5 | i | 4:21.46 | |
| 17 | Urszula Włodarczyk | (Poland) | 3 | o | 4:21.63 | |
| 18 | Saskia Alusalu | (Estonia) | 2 | o | 4:22.02 | |
| 19 | Park Ji-woo | (South Korea) | 2 | i | 4:22.94 | |
| 20 | Sofie-Karoline Haugen | (Norway) | 1 | i | 4:24.17 | |
| 21 | Erin Bartlett | (United States) | 1 | o | 4:28.44 | |
| 22 | Stephanie Beckert | (Germany) | 11 | o | 4:55.85 | |
