= 2015–16 ISU Speed Skating World Cup – World Cup 4 – Women's team sprint =

The women's team sprint race of the 2015–16 ISU Speed Skating World Cup 4, arranged in the Thialf arena in Heerenveen, Netherlands, was held on 11 December 2015.

The Dutch team won the race, while the Russian team came second, and all other teams failed to start/finish or were disqualified.

== Results ==
The race took place on Friday, 11 December, in the evening session, scheduled at 19:14.

Rank	Country	Skaters	Pair	Lane	Time	WC points
1st place, gold medalist(s)	Netherlands	Floor van den Brandt; Janine Smit; Margot Boer	2	f	1:29.23	100
2nd place, silver medalist(s)	Russia	Yekaterina Shikhova; Nadezhda Aseyeva; Olga Fatkulina	2	c	1:29.64	80
3	Canada	Marsha Hudey; Kaylin Irvine; Heather McLean	3	c	DNF	
3	Norway	Martine Ripsrud; Hege Bøkko; Ida Njåtun	1	c	DNF	
5	China	Yu Jing; Zhang Hong; Li Qishi	3	f	DQ	
6	South Korea	Park Soo-jin; Kim Min-sun; Kim Hyun-yung	1	f	DNS	
