= Taro Kondo =

Japanese speed skater (born 1994)

Personal information
- Born: 8 September 1994 (age 31) Kitami, Japan
- Height: 5 ft 8 in (173 cm)
- Weight: 170 lb (77 kg)

Sport
- Country: Japan
- Sport: Speed skating

Achievements and titles
- Highest world ranking: 41 (1500 m)

Taro Kondo (近藤 太郎) (born 8 September 1994) is a Japanese speed skater.

Kondo competed at the 2014 Winter Olympics for Japan. In the 1000 metres he finished 35th overall and in the 1500 metres he finished 31st.

Kondo won a bronze medal at the 2014 World Junior Speed Skating Championships, in the 1000 m.

Kondo made his World Cup debut in December 2012. As of September 2014, Kondo's best World Cup finish is 4th in a 1000 m B race at the World Cup stop in Nagano in 2012–13. His best overall finish in the World Cup is 41st, in the 1500 metres in 2012–13.
