= Denis Yuskov =

Russian speed skater (born 1989)

Denis Igoryevich Yuskov
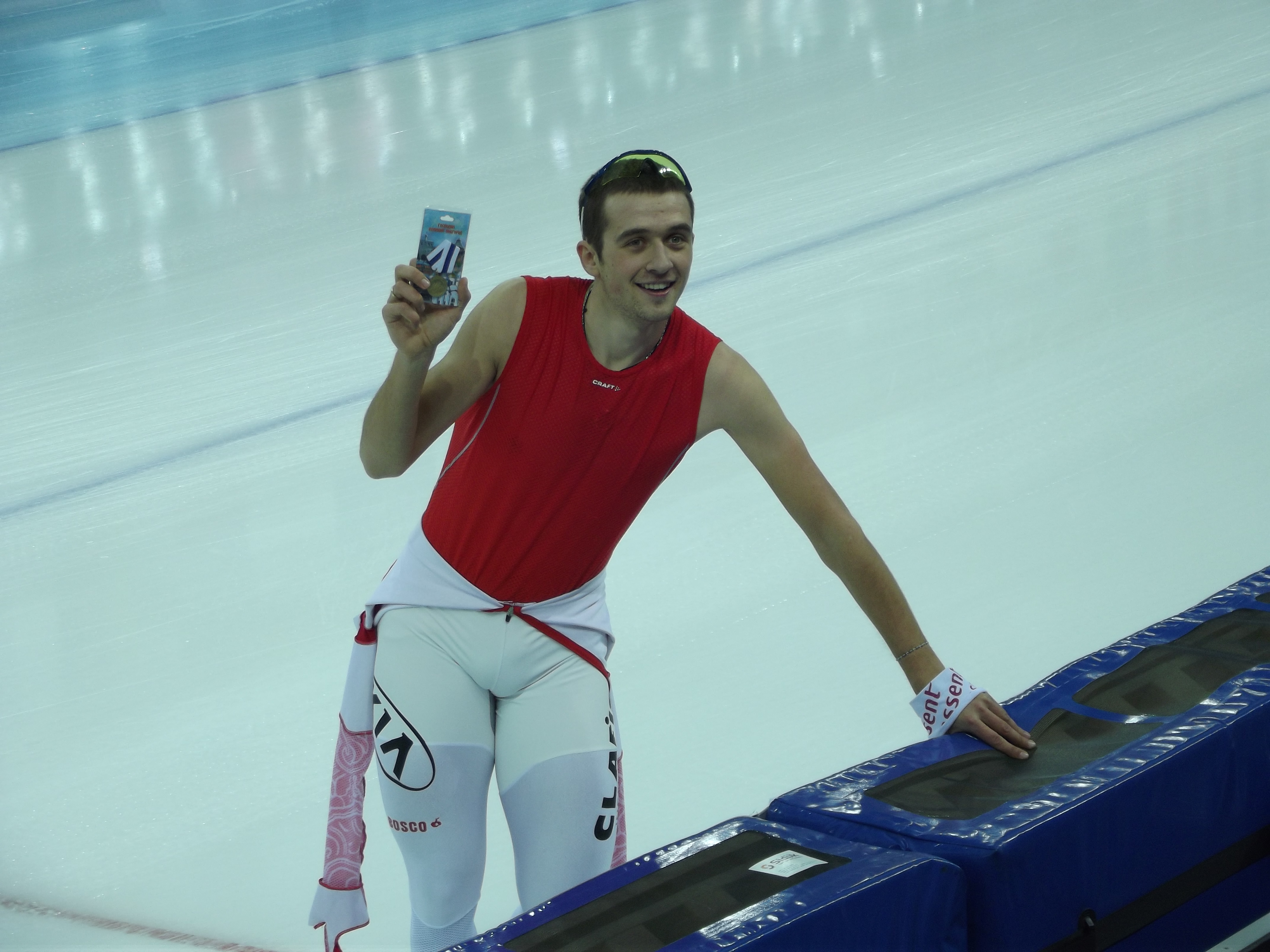
- Yuskov in 2013

Personal information
- Nationality: Russian
- Born: 11 October 1989 (age 36) Moscow, Russian SFSR, USSR
- Height: 1.90 m (6 ft 3 in)
- Weight: 83 kg (183 lb)

Sport
- Country: Russia
- Sport: Speed skating
- Events: 1500 m, 1000 m, 5000 m, allround
- Club: CSKA
Medal record
World Single Distance Championships
Gold medal – first place	2013 Sochi	1500 m
Gold medal – first place	2015 Heerenveen	1500 m
Gold medal – first place	2016 Kolomna	1500 m
Silver medal – second place	2016 Kolomna	1000 m
Silver medal – second place	2017 Gangneung	1500 m
Bronze medal – third place	2012 Heerenveen	Team pursuit
Bronze medal – third place	2019 Inzell	1500 m
World Allround Championships
Silver medal – second place	2015 Calgary	Allround
Bronze medal – third place	2014 Heerenveen	Allround
European Championships
Bronze medal – third place	2015 Chelyabinsk	Allround
European Single Distance Championships
Gold medal – first place	2018 Kolomna	1500 m
Gold medal – first place	2018 Kolomna	Team sprint
Silver medal – second place	2018 Kolomna	1000 m
Silver medal – second place	2020 Heerenveen	1500 m
Silver medal – second place	2020 Heerenveen	Team pursuit
Bronze medal – third place	2020 Heerenveen	5000 m

Denis Igoryevich Yuskov (Russian: Денис Игоревич Юсков; born 11 October 1989) is a former Russian speed skater. He is a three-time gold medalist in men's 1500 meters (2013, 2015, 2016) at the World Single Distance Championships and the World Cup-2016 holder at the distance 1500 m.

== Personal life ==
Yuskov is married and has one son, Adrian (born on 27 March 2010). His mother was Master of Sports of the USSR in volleyball. His wife Alla, her brother Anton and Denis's sister Yana were all skaters in the past. His nephew is professional ice hockey player Ilya Antonovsky.

== Career ==
Yuskov was born in Moscow, but spent his early childhood in Moldova. He later relocated with his mother back to Moscow before starting school. Dennis first met his sister from skating practice at the school, and then he started to do it, thinking it was a football team. Soon Yuskov became a member of the selected team of Moscow, setting national records in different age categories and at different distances and in the allround. Yuskov has been invited into the national junior national team.

2011–12 season — after his doping suspension was lifted, Denis Yuskov returned in the international field by competing at the 2012 European Championship, where he finished in 8th place. Later that year Yuskov competed at the World Single Distance Championships finishing in 6th place in the 1500 meters and 7th place in the 5000 meters. He also won a bronze in the team pursuit along with his compatriots Ivan Skobrev and Yevgeny Lalenkov.

2012–13 season — he won a World Cup event in Inzell, and on 21 March 2013, he became world champion in men's 1500 meters, 2013 World Single Distance Speed Skating Championships held at the Adler Arena in Sochi, updating the track record of 1:46.32. At the 5000 meter and team pursuit, he missed out the podium.

The Olympic season 2013–14 began Yuskov with a 3:34.37 at the 3000 meter run in a quartet starts during a training race before the first World Cup race of the season. This is the fastest time ever ridden, but is not recognized as an official world record. Yuskov competed at the 2014 Sochi Olympics, however only 6th place in 5000 m, 17th in men's 1000 m and finished on the 4th place in the 1500 meters. In March 2014, at the 2014 World Allround Speed Skating Championships in Heerenveen, Yuskov won the 1500 meters and took a new personal record in the 10,000 meters. He came 3rd in the allround standings earning him the bronze medal. In early April, at the National championships in Chelyabinsk, he won the gold medal in the 500 m, 1500 m, 5000 m and 10,000 m. Thus, becoming the new undisputed champion in allround of Russia.

In the 2014–15 season, Yuskov competed at the 2015 European Championships winning the allround bronze. On 13 February 2015, at the 2015 World Single Distance Speed Skating Championships, he repeated as gold medalist in 1500 meters.

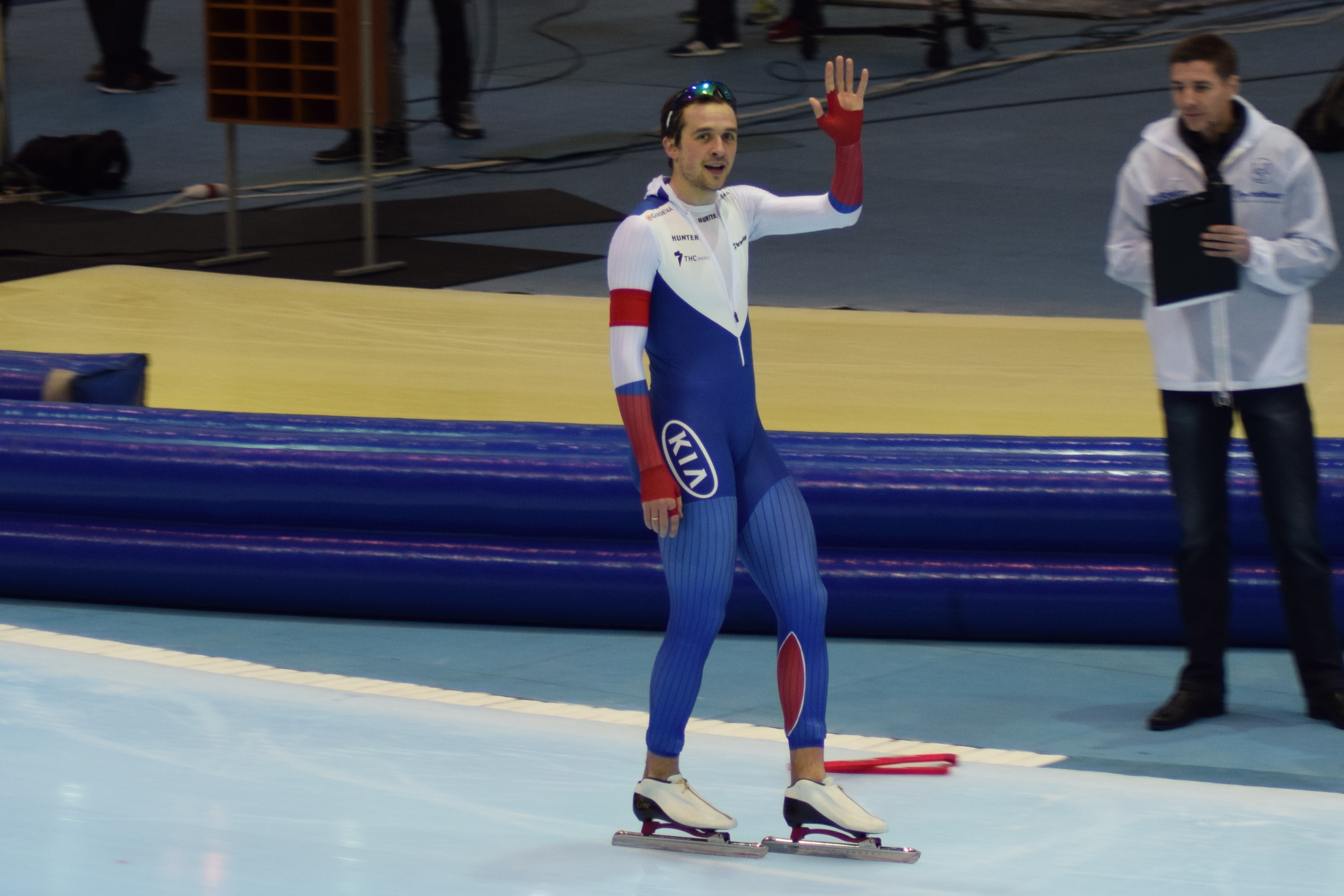
Yuskov in 2016

In the 2015–16 season. Yuskov opened his season winning the 1500 m gold at the 2015–16 ISU Speed Skating World Cup in Calgary, setting a new personal record clocking a time of 1:41.88. He then competed at the Inzell World Cup in Germany winning gold in men's 1500 m and a silver in 1000 m behind Dutch speed skater Kjeld Nuis. At the 2015–16 ISU World Cup in Heerenveen, Yuskov won 2 silver medals in 1000 m behind teammate Pavel Kulizhnikov and in 1500 m behind American Joey Mantia. In December 2015, he repeated as the allround champion at the 2016 Russian Nationals. On 9–10 January, Yuskov competed at the 2016 European Speed Skating Championships in Minsk where he placed first in men's 500 m and 1500 m however he was unable to finish the all-around events, as he later withdrew in men's 10000 m because of a minor groin injury. He returned to competition in 29–31 January at the ISU World Cup in Stavanger where he won gold in 1500 and bronze in 1000 m. On 11–14 February, At the 2016 World Single Distance Speed Skating Championships in Kolomna, Yuskov won the gold in men's 1500 m and silver in men's 1000 m behind teammate Pavel Kulizhnikov. Yuskov then competed at the 2016 World Allround Speed Skating Championships however he withdrew after the 500 m distance event because of a minor groin injury. On 11–13 March, after the World Cup Final in Heerenveen, Yuskov won the World Cup of the 2015–16 season in the 1500 m distance.

In the 2016–17 season. Yuskov won 1500 meters at the 2017 European Championships and took the 7th place on the all-round. In 2017 World Allround Speed Skating Championships Denis won the 1500 meters, but stopped on tree distances. On 9 December 2017, at the 2017 World Single Distance Speed Skating Championships, he was the silver medalist in 1500 meters, while Kjeld Nuis won gold and Sven Kramer won bronze. Yuskov won the silver on ISU World Cup after the gold medalist Kjeld Nuis.

In the 2017–18 season. Denis Yuskov competed four time before the winter Olympic games at the ISU World Cup and four time won the gold in distance 1500 meters and in Salt Lake City broke World record. In the distance 1000 m also won the gold medal. In 5–7 January 2018 Yuskov competed at the 2018 European Speed Skating Championships and won two gold medals in 1500 m and team sprint, and the silver medal in 1000 m.

== Personal records ==
Personal records
Men's speed skating
Event	Result	Date	Location	Notes
500 m	35:42	7 November 2015	Calgary	
1000 m	1:06.92	10 December 2017	Salt Lake City	
1500 m	1:41.02	9 December 2017	Salt Lake City	World record until 10 March 2019; Russian national record
3000 m	3:34.37	2 November 2013	Calgary	Below official world record, but skated in a quartet Russian national record
5000 m	6:11.79	17 November 2013	Salt Lake City	
10000 m	13:12.49	8 March 2015	Calgary	

He is currently in 8th position in the adelskalender with 145.896 points.

Source: SpeedskatingResults.com
* National record

== World Cup podiums ==
Date	Season	Location	Rank	Event
12 February 2012	2011–12	Hamar	1st place, gold medalist(s)	Team pursuit
17 November 2012	2012–13	Heerenveen	2nd place, silver medalist(s)	Team pursuit
8 March 2013	2012–13	Heerenveen (Final)	3rd place, bronze medalist(s)	Team pursuit
10 February 2013	2012–13	Inzell	1st place, gold medalist(s)	1500 m
29 November 2013	2013–14	Astana	1st place, gold medalist(s)	1500 m
6 December 2013	2013–14	Berlin	3rd place, bronze medalist(s)	1500 m
1 February 2015	2014–15	Hamar	1st place, gold medalist(s)	1500 m
15 November 2015	2015–16	Calgary	1st place, gold medalist(s)	1500 m
5 December 2015	2015–16	Inzell	2nd place, silver medalist(s)	1000 m
6 December 2015	2015–16	Inzell	1st place, gold medalist(s)	1500 m
12 December 2015	2015–16	Heerenveen	2nd place, silver medalist(s)	1000 m
13 December 2015	2015–16	Heerenveen	2nd place, silver medalist(s)	1500 m
29 January 2016	2015–16	Stavanger	1st place, gold medalist(s)	1500 m
30 January 2016	2015–16	Stavanger	3rd place, bronze medalist(s)	1000 m
12 March 2016	2015–16	Heerenveen (Final)	3rd place, bronze medalist(s)	1000 m
13 March 2016	2015–16	Heerenveen (Final)	1st place, gold medalist(s)	1500 m
13 November 2016	2016–17	Harbin	2nd place, silver medalist(s)	1500 m
4 December 2016	2016–17	Astana	1st place, gold medalist(s)	1500 m
10 December 2016	2016–17	Heerenveen	2nd place, silver medalist(s)	1500 m
27 January 2017	2016–17	Berlin	2nd place, silver medalist(s)	1500 m
11 November 2017	2017–18	Heerenveen	1st place, gold medalist(s)	1500 m
3 December 2017	2017–18	Calgary	1st place, gold medalist(s)	1500 m
9 December 2017	2017–18	Salt Lake City	1st place, gold medalist(s)	1500 m
10 December 2017	2017–18	Salt Lake City	1st place, gold medalist(s)	1000 m
19 January 2018	2017–18	Erfurt	1st place, gold medalist(s)	1500 m
18 March 2018	2017–18	Minsk	2nd place, silver medalist(s)	1500 m
17 November 2018	2018–19	Obihiro	1st place, gold medalist(s)	1500 m
8 December 2018	2018–19	Tomaszów Mazowiecki	1st place, gold medalist(s)	1500 m
16 December 2018	2018–19	Heerenveen	3rd place, bronze medalist(s)	1000 m
3 February 2019	2018–19	Hamar	1st place, gold medalist(s)	1500 m
15 November 2019	2019–20	Minsk	3rd place, bronze medalist(s)	5000 m
17 November 2019	2019–20	Minsk	2nd place, silver medalist(s)	1500 m
22 November 2019	2019–20	Tomaszów Mazowiecki	3rd place, bronze medalist(s)	5000 m
23 November 2019	2019–20	Tomaszów Mazowiecki	3rd place, bronze medalist(s)	1500 m
24 November 2019	2019–20	Tomaszów Mazowiecki	3rd place, bronze medalist(s)	Team pursuit
7 February 2020	2019–20	Calgary	1st place, gold medalist(s)	1500 m

=== Overall rankings ===
Season	Event	Rank
2012–13	Team pursuit	3rd place, bronze medalist(s)
2013–14	1500 m	2nd place, silver medalist(s)
2015–16	1500 m	1st place, gold medalist(s)
2016–17	1500 m	2nd place, silver medalist(s)
2017–18	1500 m	1st place, gold medalist(s)
2018–19	1500 m	1st place, gold medalist(s)
