= Jonathan Garcia =

American speed skater

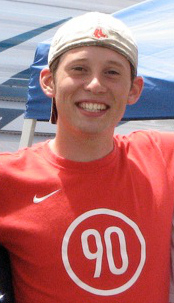
- Jonathan Garcia in 2007

Personal information
- Born: December 14, 1986 (age 39)
- Height: 170 cm (5 ft 7 in)
- Weight: 64 kg (141 lb)
- Website: www.jonathangarcia.us

Sport
- Country: United States
- Sport: Speed skating
- Coached by: Ryan Shimabukuro
Medal record
Inline World Championships
Bronze medal – third place	2006 Korea	Men's relay

Jonathan Garcia (born December 14, 1986) is an American former speed skater and ice hockey coach. Garcia began his skating career as an inline speed skater, winning his first national title in 2004. He represented the United States three times in the World Championships, winning a bronze medal in 2006.

In 2007, he represented the United States at the Pan American Games before transitioning to short track speed skating on the ice.

In 2010, Garcia made the short track World Cup team, won a national title. He finished 14th at the 2010 Olympic Trials. Garcia won a second national title in 2011 before transitioning to long-track speed skating. He made the World Cup team in 2012 and the World Championships in 2013.

At the 2014 Olympic Trials, Garcia appeared to qualify for the team in the 500-meter sprint, only to have his time disallowed due to his failure to wear a backup timing device. The following day, Garcia made the Olympic team by finishing fourth in the 1000-meter event.

== Early life ==
Jonathan Garcia was born on December 14, 1986, and grew up in Katy, Texas, in the Houston metropolitan area. In 1994, he began inline skating at age 7. He graduated from Katy Taylor High School in 2005.

== Sporting career ==
In 2004, Garcia won his first national championship in inline speed skating and was named Inline Skater of the Year. He subsequently made three world teams and won a bronze medal at the 2006 Inline World Championships in Korea.

In 2007, Garcia represented the United States at the 2007 Pan American Games. He finished fifth overall in the distance contest after placing third in the 20,000-meter elimination, sixth in the 10,000 meters, and fifth in the 15,000 meters.

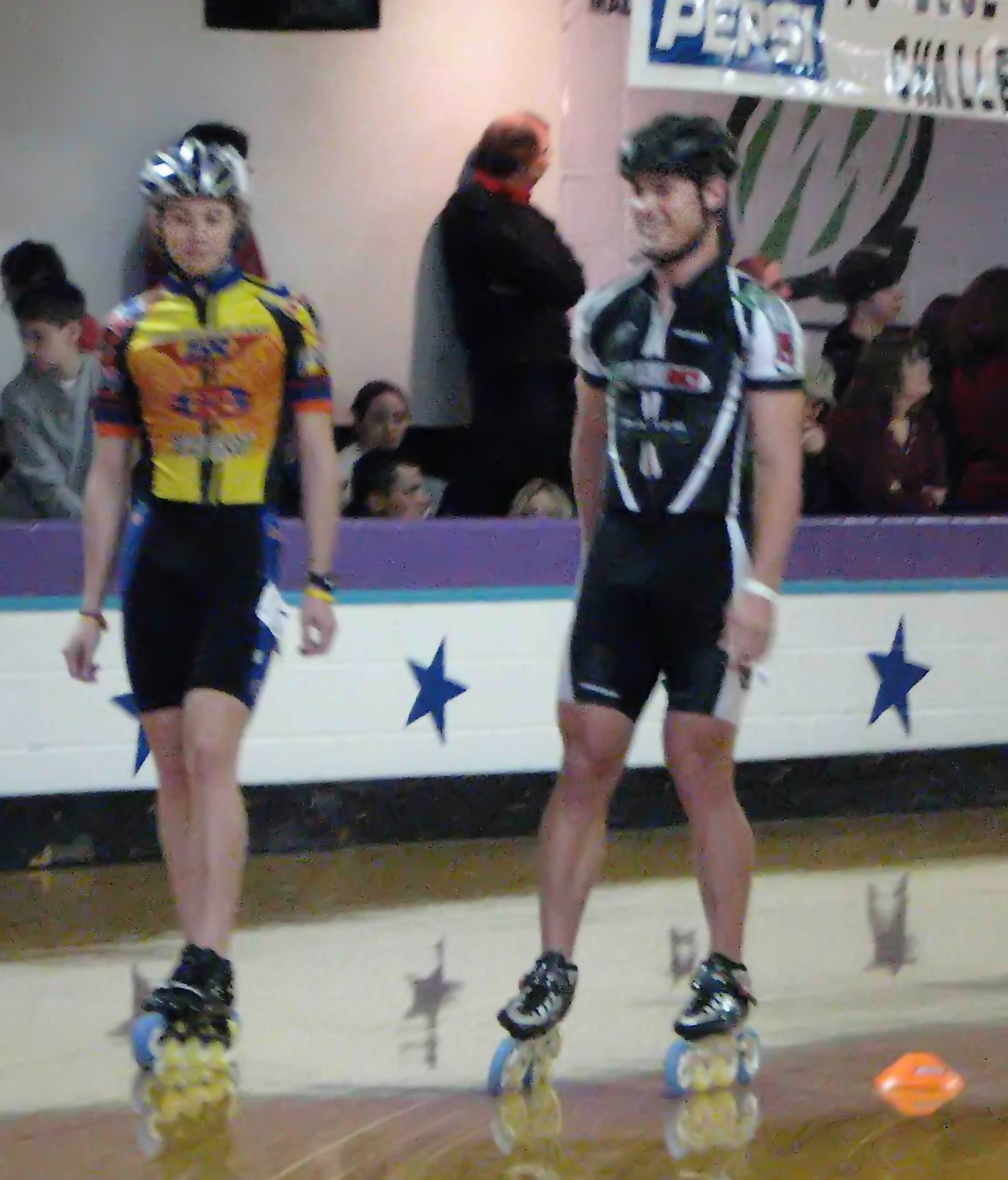
Jonathan Garcia and Joey Mantia warm up for an inline competition in 2007

In 2006, Garcia watched fellow Texan and former inline skater Chad Hedrick win three gold medals at the Olympics. Hendricks' wins inspired Garcia to make the transition to speed skating in hopes of making an Olympic team. To pursue his dream, Garcia moved to Salt Lake City, Utah, in 2007 to begin training on the ice. After a season of training, he decided he was best suited for short track.

In 2010, he made the United States World Cup team and won the national 3000-meter title. He competed in the 2010 short track Olympic trials, finishing 14th overall.

In 2011, Garcia won the national 1000-meter time trials.

In 2012, Garcia transitioned to long-track speed skating amidst turmoil within the short-track team. He made the long track World Cup team that same year and represented the United States at the 2013 Long Track World Sprint Championship.

At the United States Olympic Trials in December 2013, Garcia turned in a time of 34.85s, 0.29 better than his personal best, in his second 500-meter race. His combined time from two skates placed him fourth, and Garcia appeared to qualify for the 2014 Winter Olympics. However, he had failed to wear a transponder, which serves as a third timing device in some races, on his ankle. Garcia's time was disallowed as a result. He was granted a re-skate, but his re-skate time was good enough for only sixth place, outside the qualifying position. "Today was tough, especially because I qualified for that fourth spot," Garcia remarked. "I know I was good enough to be on the team. That’s something nobody can take away from me," he added. Shani Davis, who claimed the fourth spot after Garcia's disqualification remarked, "I was really pulling for Garcia to pull through and, make the spot, even if it knocked me off the team ... I want the best skaters to go."

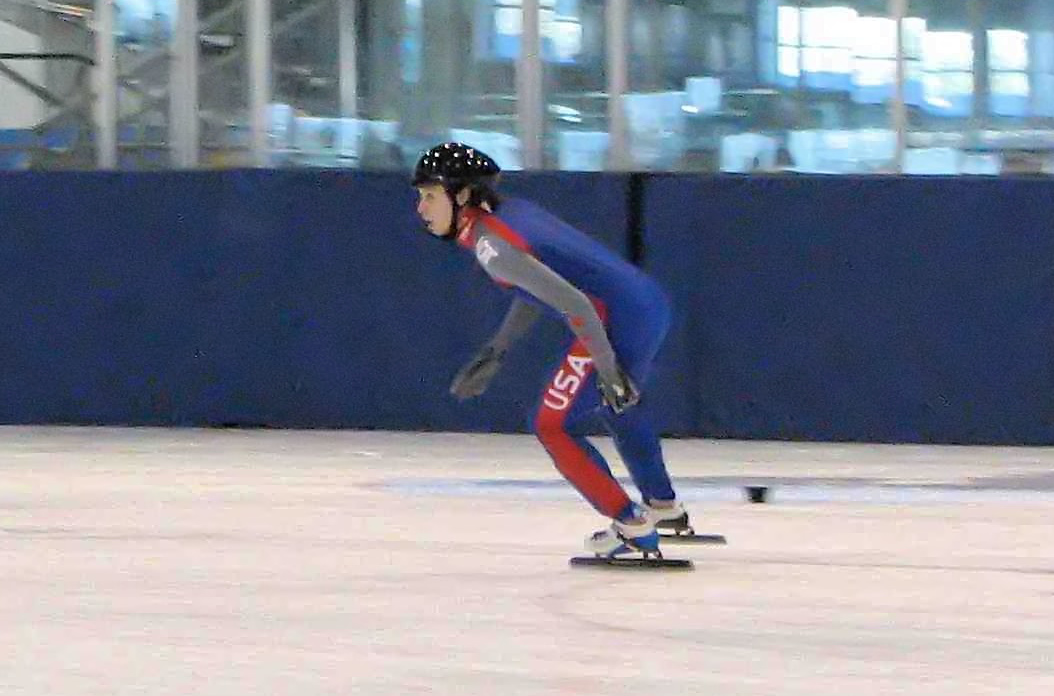
Jonathan Garcia practices his short track skating

The following day, Garcia skated in the 1000-meter event, where he was given "no chance" to qualify by many commentators. Garcia, however, turned in a career-best 1:07.95 and moved into fourth place with several skaters remaining. No one who came after Garcia bettered his time, allowing him to qualify for the Olympics. "I was definitely doing some praying after my race," he said. "Not to sound weird or cocky, but I kind of feel like I already made the team yesterday." After qualifying, he skated a celebratory lap holding the timing transponders above his head "[you] might as well be able to make fun of yourself," he commented.

Garcia was coached by Ryan Shimabukuro. He competed in the 500-meter, 1000-meter, and 1500-meter-long track events. He lists his turns as his greatest speed skating strength.

== Ice hockey coaching career ==
On January 12, 2026, Garcia was hired as an assistant skating coach by the Pittsburgh Penguins.

== Personal life ==
As of 2013, Garcia lives in Salt Lake City. When he is not speed skating, he plays soccer competitively. Garcia lists listening to music and playing guitar as his favorite hobbies. He calls Michael Jordan his greatest influence.

== Personal bests ==
Personal records
Men's speed skating
Event	Result	Date	Location	Notes
500 m	35.14	November 15, 2013	Utah Olympic Oval, Salt Lake City	
1000 m	1:07.95	December 29, 2013	Utah Olympic Oval, Salt Lake City	
1500 m	1:45.99	December 31, 2013	Utah Olympic Oval, Salt Lake City	
3000 m	4:00.17	October 5, 2013	Pettit National Ice Center, Milwaukee	
