= Konrád Nagy =

Hungarian speed skater (born 1992)

Konrád Nagy (born 26 March 1992, in Debrecen) is a Hungarian speed skater and former short track speed skater. He started in short track speed skating, but switched to "long-track" in 2013. He competed in speed skating for Hungary at the 2014 Winter Olympics.

Nagy is the current holder of the Hungarian records in 1000, 1500, 3000, 5000 and 10000 metres.

== Personal records ==
Personal records
Men's speed skating
Event	Result	Date	Location	Notes
500 m	36.48	9 January 2016	Minsk-Arena, Minsk	
1000 m	1:09.51	21 November 2015	Utah Olympic Oval, Salt Lake City	Current Hungarian record.
1500 m	1:45.69	15 November 2013	Utah Olympic Oval, Salt Lake City	Current Hungarian record.
3000 m	3:49.05	11 October 2014	Eisstadion Inzell, Inzell	Current Hungarian record.
5000 m	6:40.61	7 March 2015	Olympic Oval, Calgary	Current Hungarian record.
10000 m	14:26.43	18 December 2013	Stadio del Ghiaccio, Baselga di Pinè	Current Hungarian record.

Winter Olympics
Preceded by Bernadett Heidum	Flagbearer for Hungary; Pyeongchang 2018	Succeeded by Márton Kékesi; Zita Tóth
