= Alexandre St-Jean =

Canadian speed skater

Personal information
- Born: 10 May 1993 (age 33) Quebec City, Quebec

Sport
- Country: Canada
- Sport: Speed skating

Alexandre St-Jean (born 10 May 1993) is a Canadian speed skater who is specialized in the sprint distances.

== Career ==
St-Jean started his speed skating career as a short tracker. He switched from short track to long track speed skating in 2013. He won his first-ever World Cup medal, a gold medal in the team sprint event, at the World Cup in Salt Lake City in November 2015. In December he won a silver medal when he finished second in the World Cup 500m event in Inzell. St-Jean is coached by Gregor Jelonek.

=== 2018 Winter Olympics ===
St-Jean qualified to compete for Canada at the 2018 Winter Olympics.

== Personal records ==
Personal records
Men's speed skating
Event	Result	Date	Location	Notes
500 m	34.46	22 November 2015	Salt Lake City	
1000 m	1:07.84	2 December 2017	Calgary	
1500 m	1:49.39	2 January 2014	Calgary	
3000 m	4:02.12	15 August 2015	Calgary	
5000 m	9:19.28	16 December 2007	Quebec City	

Source: SpeedskatingResults.com
