= Kirill Golubev =

Russian ice hockey player

- Born: 1 February 1974 (age 52) Izhevsk, Russian SFSR, Soviet Union
- Height: 6 ft 4 in (193 cm)
- Weight: 205 lb (93 kg; 14 st 9 lb)
- Position: Left wing
- Played for: Izhstal Izhevsk; Itil Kazan; Ak Bars Kazan; HC Neftekhimik Nizhnekamsk; CSK VVS Samara; HC Lipetsk; Krylya Sovetov Moscow; Neftyanik Almetievsk
- Playing career: 1991–2005

Kirill Golubev (born 1 February 1974) is a Soviet and Russian former professional ice hockey forward. He is a one-time Russian Champion.

== Awards and honors ==
Award	Year
RSL
Winner (Ak Bars Kazan)	1998
