= Vincent De Haître =

Canadian speed skater and cyclist

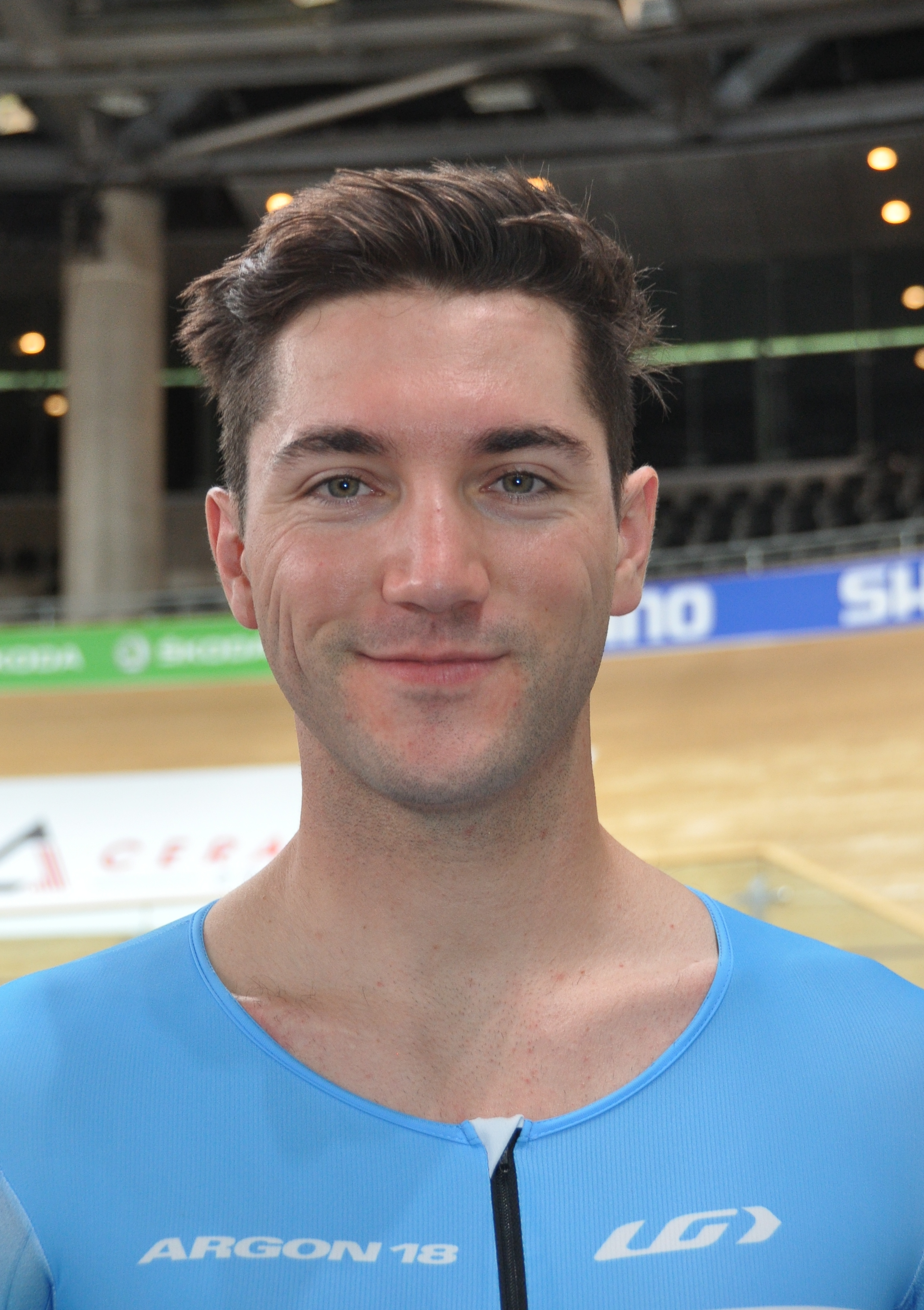
- De Haître in 2020

Personal information
- Born: June 16, 1994 (age 32) Ottawa, Ontario
- Education: University of Calgary
- Height: 183 cm (6 ft 0 in)
- Weight: 90 kg (198 lb)
- Website: https:/www.vincentdehaitre.com/

Sport
- Country: Canada
- Sport: Speed skating Track cycling
- Turned pro: 2013
Medal record
Representing Canada
Men's speed skating
World Championships
Silver medal – second place	2017 Gangneung	1000 m
Men's track cycling
Pan American Championships
Gold medal – first place	2019 Cochabamba	Team pursuit
Bronze medal – third place	2019 Cochabamba	1km time trial

Vincent De Haître (born June 16, 1994) is a Canadian dual-sport athlete competing as both a speed skater and track cyclist who has been in sport since 2000. After competing at his second Olympic games in PyeongChang De Haître made the switch back over to track cycling where he has been competing as a member of the Canadian national team since the fall of 2018 in an effort to qualify for the 2020 Summer Olympics in Tokyo.

== Career ==
=== Speed skating ===
De Haître started in speed skating competing in the Gloucester Concordes speed skating club. He looked up to fellow Olympian and Gloucester teammate Ivanie Blondin who would sometime compete at the club in her national team uniform to which De Haître looked at as inspiration. He won a silver medal in the 3000m relay at the 2011 Canada Winter Games and made his World Cup debut in 2013. De Haître qualified to compete as a member of Team Canada at the 2014 Winter Olympics in Sochi, Russia, by winning the 1000m event at the Canadian speed skating trials and finishing third in the 1500m. Along with the 500m race he set three personal bests by a significant margin to qualify. De Haître was the youngest speed skater for team Canada at the 2014 games and surprised himself by qualifying, he said that he was looking ahead to the 2018 games in PyeongChang and not Sochi. De Haître qualified to compete for Canada at the 2018 Winter Olympics.

=== Cycling ===
As a junior, he raced for the Ottawa Bicycle Club's Junior Team in both roads and track disciplines coached by Don Moxley, a team which produced several provincially and nationally successful junior cyclists. On the track, he won the 1 km time trial at the 2013 Canadian Track Championships over Zachary Bell. During the 2014 Canadian trials in Aguascalientes, Mexico, De Haître broke the Canadian record per kilometre. Also in 2014, De Haître competed at the 2014 Commonwealth games in Scotland, where he finished fourth in the team sprint and seventh in the per-kilometre event.

== Personal life ==
Born in Cumberland, Ontario, De Haître attended École secondaire catholique Béatrice-Desloges, a catholic French art high school, and subsequently attended the University of Calgary to pursue a Bachelor of Arts degree while training with Canada's national long-track team.

== Personal records ==
Distance	Nation	City	Date	Time
500 meters	Canada	Calgary	January 5, 2018	35.90
1000 meters	Canada	Calgary	February 25, 2017	1:06.72
1500 meters	Canada	Calgary	December 3, 2017	1:43.13
3000 meters	Canada	Calgary	September 23, 2017	3:44.76
5000 meters	Canada	Calgary	March 17, 2017	6:39.86
