= Joey Mantia =

American speed skater

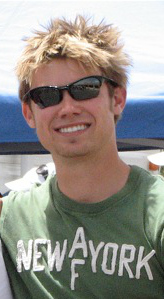
- Mantia in 2007

Personal information
- Born: February 7, 1986 (age 40) Ocala, Florida, United States
- Height: 1.73 m (5 ft 8 in)
- Weight: 76 kg (168 lb)

Sport
- Country: United States
- Sport: Speed skating
- Events: 1500 m, mass start
Medal record
Men's speed skating
Representing the United States
Olympic Games
Bronze medal – third place	2022 Beijing	Team pursuit
World Championships
Gold medal – first place	2017 Gangneung	Mass start
Gold medal – first place	2019 Inzell	Mass start
Gold medal – first place	2021 Heerenveen	Mass start
Bronze medal – third place	2020 Salt Lake City	1500 m
Men's inline speed skating
World Championships
Gold medal – first place	2009: Track	300 m
Gold medal – first place	2009: Track	1000 m
Gold medal – first place	2009: Track	15 K
Gold medal – first place	2009: Track	Relay
Gold medal – first place	2009: Road	20 K
Gold medal – first place	2009: Road	Marathon
Gold medal – first place	2009: Road	Relay
Gold medal – first place	2010: Track	500 m
Gold medal – first place	2010: Track	1000 m
Silver medal – second place	2009: Road	10 K
Silver medal – second place	2010: Track	300 m
Silver medal – second place	2010: Track	Relay
Bronze medal – third place	2009: Track	500 m
Bronze medal – third place	2009: Road	200 m
Bronze medal – third place	2010: Road	20 K

Joey Mantia (born February 7, 1986) is a former American speed skater and inline speed skater, an Olympic bronze medalist, 28-time world champion, and a world record holder. He also won two gold medals at the 2003 Pan American Games and a gold medal at the 2007 Pan American Games. He won the American Speed Skater of the Year award three times in a row, in 2005, 2006, and 2007, and the 2007 Elmer Ringeisen Sportsmanship Award. In October 2010, after winning two world titles at the inline skating championships in Colombia, he was ranked second among male competitors in the USOC Athlete of the Month competition.

As of January 7, 2010, Mantia held the world records for the road race over 500 m (38.6 seconds), 10,000 m (13 minutes, 46.801 seconds), and 20,000 m (28 minutes, 56.189 seconds), and the world records for the track race over 300 m (24.250 seconds) and 15,000 m (22 minutes, 32.644 seconds).

== Early life ==
Joey Mantia started skating on inline skates as a self-described "rink rat," often asking his parents to bring him to the local indoor skating rink. He spent a lot of time at public skating sessions and learned about speed skating by watching inline skating practice at the rink. After experiencing inline speed skating, Mantia decided to dedicate his life to "becoming the best speed skater in the world".

== Speed skating career ==
In 2010, Mantia switched from inline speed skating to speed skating on ice. He first moved to the Olympic Training Center in Colorado Springs, Colorado, then to Salt Lake City, Utah, to train with the national team two years later. Mantia finished fourth at the 2011 US speed skating championships over 5000 m, tenth in the 1000 m and eighth in the 1500 m.

In early 2013, Mantia made his debut on the World Cup competition circuit. He found success less than a year later, at the Berlin World Cup in December 2013, where he finished first in the 1500 m, beating out his teammate Shani Davis, a two-time Olympic silver medalist in the 1500 m, and Russia's Denis Yuskov, the reigning world champion, to win gold.

Mantia represented Team USA at the 2014 Sochi Winter Olympics, where he finished 15th in the 1000 m, 22nd in the 1500 m, and 7th in the team pursuit. In January 2018, Mantia qualified for the 2018 U.S. Olympic Team, winning the 1000 m and 1500 m events. He also qualified for the mass start.

On December 13, 2021, Mantia won his second-straight 1500m World Cup title in Salt Lake City.

His first Olympic medal was a bronze in the team pursuit with the U.S. team at the 2022 Winter Olympics in Beijing.

On July 7, 2023, Mantia announced his retirement. He is the coach of the Belgian women's short track speed skating team.

== Personal records ==
Personal records
Men's speed skating
Event	Result	Date	Location	Notes
500 m	35.06	December 28, 2013	Utah Olympic Oval, Salt Lake City	
1000 m	1:07.34	March 9, 2019	Utah Olympic Oval, Salt Lake City	
1500 m	1:41.15	December 4, 2021	Utah Olympic Oval, Salt Lake City	
3000 m	3:40.76	December 30, 2016	Utah Olympic Oval, Salt Lake City	
5000 m	6:28.50	March 14, 2012	Olympic Oval, Calgary	
10000 m	13:54.13	January 13, 2013	Utah Olympic Oval, Salt Lake City	

As of March 24, 2024, his ranking on the all-time Adelskalender is 75th.

== Personal life ==
Mantia is an investor and owner in Coffee Lab, a coffee shop located on the University of Utah campus. In his free time, Mantia taught himself to play piano. His partner is Belgian short track speed skater Hanne Desmet.

== Sponsorships ==
Mantia has appeared in XFINITY commercials, and a Giorgio Armani short film entitled The Scent of Life by Acqua di Giò – Joey Mantia – Episode 2.
