= 2015–16 ISU Speed Skating World Cup – Men's mass start =

The men's mass start in the 2015–16 ISU Speed Skating World Cup will be contested over five races on six occasions, out of a total of World Cup occasions for the season, with the first occasion taking place in Calgary, Alberta, Canada, on 13–15 November 2015, and the final occasion taking place in Heerenveen, Netherlands, on 11–13 March 2016.

The defending champion is Lee Seung-hoon of South Korea. This season Arjan Stroetinga won two of five races and the final classification.

== Top three ==
Position	Athlete	Points	Previous season

== Race medallists ==
WC #	Location	Date	Gold	Race points	Silver	Race points	Bronze	Race points	Report
1	Calgary, Canada	15 November	Bart Swings; Belgium	65	Jorrit Bergsma; Netherlands	45	Reyon Kay; New Zealand	25	
2	Salt Lake City, United States	22 November	Arjan Stroetinga; Netherlands	60	Fabio Francolini; Italy	41	Bart Swings; Belgium	21	
3	Inzell, Germany	6 December	Alexis Contin; France	60	Jorrit Bergsma; Netherlands	48	Fabio Francolini; Italy	22	
4	Heerenveen, Netherlands	13 December	Arjan Stroetinga; Netherlands	63	Fabio Francolini; Italy	40	Lee Seung-hoon; South Korea	20	
6	Heerenveen, Netherlands	13 March	Bart Swings; Belgium	68	Fabio Francolini; Italy	40	Arjan Stroetinga; Netherlands	21	

Note: in mass start, race points are accumulated during the race. The skater with most race points is the winner. The races are over 16 laps.

== Standings ==
#	Name	Nat.	CGY	SLC	INZ	HVN1	HVN2	Total
1	Arjan Stroetinga	(Netherlands)	50	100	50	100		300
2	Fabio Francolini	(Italy)	28	80	70	80		258
3	Jorrit Bergsma	(Netherlands)	80	40	80	32		232
4	Bart Swings	(Belgium)	100	70	—	60		230
5	Alexis Contin	(France)		60	100	50		210
6	Reyon Kay	(New Zealand)	70	16	40	18		144
7	Lee Seung-hoon	(South Korea)		28	25	70		123
8	Jordan Belchos	(Canada)	21	18	32	40		111
9	K. C. Boutiette	(United States)	24	24	16	45		109
10	Peter Michael	(New Zealand)	40	32	28	8		108
11	Viktor Hald Thorup	(Denmark)	25	50	14	14		103
12	Sun Longjiang	(China)	36	36	3	16		91
13	Kim Cheol-min	(South Korea)	19	45	24	2		90
14	Haralds Silovs	(Latvia)	4	19	60	—		83
15	Livio Wenger	(Switzerland)	60	2	8	12		82
16	Andrea Giovannini	(Italy)	32	14	36	—		82
17	Robert Watson	(Canada)	18	8	45	3		74
18	Joey Mantia	(United States)	2	25	21	21		69
19	Mathias Vosté	(Belgium)	8	12	4	36		60
20	Shane Williamson	(Japan)	45	5	6	1		57
21	Joo Hyung-joon	(South Korea)	16	15	18	—		49
22	Shota Nakamura	(Japan)	10	21	5	10		46
23	Jan Blokhuijsen	(Canada)	15	11	19	—		45
24	Nicola Tumolero	(Italy)	0	0	15	24		39
25	Armin Hager	(Austria)	14	3	12	4		33
26	Yevgeny Serayev	(Russia)	8	6	10	5		29
27	Sverre Lunde Pedersen	(Norway)	—	—	—	28		28
28	Vitaly Mikhailov	(Belarus)	12	4	1	6		23
29	Linus Heidegger	(Austria)	5	10	2	—		17
30	Takuro Ogawa	(Japan)	11	—	1	—		12
31	Andres Campo	(Colombia)	—	—	11	—		11
32	Olivier Jean	(Canada)	—	8	0	—		8
33	Joshua Capponi	(Australia)	—	—	8	—		8
34	Anton Kapustin	(Belarus)	6	1	—	—		7
34	Dmitry Babenko	(Kazakhstan)	1	6	0	—		7
36	Jan Szymański	(Poland)	3	2	2	—		7
37	Hubert Hirschbichler	(Germany)	6	—	—	—		6
37	Martin Hänggi	(Switzerland)	0	0	6	—		6
39	Marcin Bachanek	(Poland)	4	1	0	—		5
40	Ryosuke Tsuchiya	(Japan)	—	4	—	—		4
40	Tormod Bjørnetun Haugen	(Norway)	—	—	4	—		4
