= 2014–15 ISU Speed Skating World Cup – Men's mass start =

The men's mass start in the 2014–15 ISU Speed Skating World Cup was contested over six races on six occasions, out of a total of seven World Cup occasions for the season, with the first occasion taking place in Obihiro, Japan, on 14–16 November 2014, and the final occasion taking place in Erfurt, Germany, on 21–22 March 2015. The races were over 16 laps.

The defending champion was Bob de Vries of the Netherlands. Lee Seung-hoon of South Korea won the cup. De Vries did not participate this season.

== Top three ==
Position	Athlete	Points	Previous season
1	(South Korea) Lee Seung-hoon	450	–
2	(Belgium) Bart Swings	387	3rd
3	(Italy) Andrea Giovannini	362	8th

== Race medallists ==
WC #	Location	Date	Gold	Race points	Silver	Race points	Bronze	Race points	Report
1	Obihiro, Japan	16 November	Lee Seung-hoon; South Korea	60	Kim Cheol-min; South Korea	40	Bart Swings; Belgium	20	
2	Seoul, South Korea	23 November	Andrea Giovannini; Italy	70	Haralds Silovs; Latvia	40	Lee Seung-hoon; South Korea	20	
3	Berlin, Germany	7 December	Lee Seung-hoon; South Korea	61	Arjan Stroetinga; Netherlands	40	Bart Swings; Belgium	25	
4	Heerenveen, Netherlands	14 December	Jorrit Bergsma; Netherlands	70	Lee Seung-hoon; South Korea	40	Fabio Francolini; Italy	20	
5	Hamar, Norway	1 February	Lee Seung-hoon; South Korea	60	Marco Weber; Germany	40	Bart Swings; Belgium	25	
7	Erfurt, Germany	22 March	Bart Swings; Belgium	65	Jorrit Bergsma; Netherlands	41	Sverre Lunde Pedersen; Norway	23	

Note: in mass start, race points are accumulated during the race. The skater with most race points is the winner.

== Standings ==
Standings as of 22 March 2015 (end of the season).

#	Name	Nat.	OBI	SEO	BER	HVN	HAM	ERF	Total
1	Lee Seung-hoon	(South Korea)	100	70	100	80	100		450
2	Bart Swings	(Belgium)	70	3	70	24	70	150	387
3	Andrea Giovannini	(Italy)	40	100	36	50	60	76	362
4	Jorrit Bergsma	(Netherlands)			60	100		120	280
5	Marco Weber	(Germany)			16	32	80	90	218
6	Shane Williamson	(Japan)	45	21	45	14	32	32	189
7	Sverre Lunde Pedersen	(Norway)		32			45	106	183
8	Kim Cheol-min	(South Korea)	80	36	21	21	21		179
9	Haralds Silovs	(Latvia)		80	24	36	18		158
10	Linus Heidegger	(Austria)	36	60			36	18	150
11	Alexej Baumgärtner	(Germany)	60	14	6		10	45	135
12	Arjan Stroetinga	(Netherlands)			80	16		28	124
13	Sun Longjiang	(China)			18	40	40	24	122
14	Robert Watson	(Canada)	24	1	50	18	24		117
15	Nicola Tumolero	(Italy)	32	6	40		12	21	111
16	Armin Hager	(Austria)	12			3	50	40	105
17	Ryosuke Tsuchiya	(Japan)	6	45	14	4		36	105
18	Patrick Beckert	(Germany)	50			45			95
19	Jeffrey Swider-Peltz	(United States)	21	28	12	10	16		87
20	Tyler Derraugh	(Canada)		16	8	60			84
21	Alexis Contin	(France)			28	28	28		84
22	Bram Smallenbroek	(Austria)		50	32				82
23	Fabio Francolini	(Italy)				70			70
24	Roland Cieslak	(Poland)	10	40	1	6			57
25	Yevgeny Seryaev	(Russia)	4	18	5	8	8		43
26	Gerben Jorritsma	(Netherlands)	16	24					40
27	Douwe de Vries	(Netherlands)	28						28
28	Danila Semerikov	(Russia)	18	5					23
29	Martin Hänggi	(Switzerland)	5	8		1	3		17
30	Peter Michael	(New Zealand)			3	12			15
31	Reyon Kay	(New Zealand)					14		14
31	Rehanbai Talabuhan	(China)	14						14
33	Li Bailin	(China)		12					12
34	Håvard Holmefjord Lorentzen	(Norway)		10					10
34	Vitaly Mikhailov	(Belarus)			10				10
36	Liu Yiming	(China)	8						8
37	Viktor Hald Thorup	(Denmark)					6		6
38	Dmitry Babenko	(Kazakhstan)				5			5
38	Stefan Waples	(Canada)					5		5
40	Fredrik van der Horst	(Norway)			4				4
40	Konrád Nagy	(Hungary)					4		4
40	Koen Verweij	(Netherlands)		4					4
43	Stefan Due Schmidt	(Denmark)			2	2			4
44	Jan Szymański	(Poland)	3						3
45	Edwin Park	(United States)		2					2
45	Iñigo Vidondo	(Spain)					2		2
47	Joshua Capponi	(Australia)					1		1
