= 2015–16 ISU Speed Skating World Cup – Men's 5000 and 10000 metres =

The 5000 and 10000 meters distances for men in the 2015–16 ISU Speed Skating World Cup will be contested as one cup over six races on six occasions, out of a total of World Cup occasions for the season, with the first occasion taking place in Calgary, Alberta, Canada, on 13–15 November 2015, and the final occasion taking place in Heerenveen, Netherlands, on 11–13 March 2016.

The defending champion is Jorrit Bergsma of the Netherlands.

== Top three ==
Position	Athlete	Points	Previous season

== Race medallists ==
WC #	Location	Date	Distance	Gold	Time	Silver	Time	Bronze	Time	Report
1	Calgary, Canada	13 November	5000 metres	Sven Kramer; Netherlands	6:08.61	Jorrit Bergsma; Netherlands	6:10.44	Ted-Jan Bloemen; Canada	6:12.72	
2	Salt Lake City, United States	21 November	10000 metres	Ted-Jan Bloemen; Canada	12:36.30 WR	Sven Kramer; Netherlands	12:44.26	Jorrit Bergsma; Netherlands	12:53.79	
3	Inzell, Germany	5 December	5000 metres	Jorrit Bergsma; Netherlands	6:17.35	Sverre Lunde Pedersen; Norway	6:19.52	Arjan Stroetinga; Netherlands	6:21.66	
4	Heerenveen, Netherlands	12 December	5000 metres	Sven Kramer; Netherlands	6:14.99	Jorrit Bergsma; Netherlands	6:16.40	Bart Swings; Belgium	6:20.80	
5	Stavanger, Norway	30 January	5000 metres	Sven Kramer; Netherlands	6:15.71	Jorrit Bergsma; Netherlands	6:17.59	Ted-Jan Bloemen; Canada	6:18.05	
6	Heerenveen, Netherlands	12 March	5000 metres	Sven Kramer; Netherlands	6:11.44	Jorrit Bergsma; Netherlands	6:12.74	Sverre Lunde Pedersen; Norway	6:16.36	

== Standings ==
#	Name	Nat.	CGY	SLC	INZ	HVN1	STA	HVN2	Total
1	Sven Kramer	(Netherlands)	100	80	—	100	100	150	530
2	Jorrit Bergsma	(Netherlands)	80	70	100	80	80	120	530
3	Sverre Lunde Pedersen	(Norway)	40	25	80	60	60	104	369
4	Ted-Jan Bloemen	(Canada)	70	100	—	—	70	90	330
5	Patrick Beckert	(Germany)	60	60	40	35	50	28	273
6	Bart Swings	(Belgium)	50	50	—	70	45	45	260
7	Douwe de Vries	(Netherlands)	45	—	60	45	40	36	226
8	Arjan Stroetinga	(Netherlands)	-	27	70	30	12	76	215
9	Erik Jan Kooiman	(Netherlands)	35	40	45	40	—	40	200
10	Andrea Giovannini	(Italy)	25	35	25	21	30	24	160
11	Peter Michael	(New Zealand)	32	45	50	25	—	—	152
12	Jordan Belchos	(Canada)	27	30	21	16	18	32	144
13	Moritz Geisreiter	(Germany)	23	23	35	14	21	21	137
14	Håvard Bøkko	(Norway)	0	19	32	18	35	—	104
15	Alexis Contin	(France)	—	21	30	50	—	—	101
16	Aleksandr Rumyantsev	(Russia)	30	0	14	27	30	—	101
17	Yevgeny Serayev	(Russia)	12	9	16	23	16	—	76
18	Viktor Hald Thorup	(Denmark)	19	5	12	19	10	—	65
19	Ryosuke Tsuchiya	(Japan)	1	—	27	10	14	—	52
20	Jonas Pflug	(Germany)	—	—	19	32	—	—	51
21	Lee Seung-Hoon	(South Korea)	21	15	10	3	—	—	49
22	Ole Bjørnsmoen Næss	(Norway)	—	—	23	12	0	—	35
23	Thomas-Henrik Søfteland	(Norway)	—	—	5	6	23	—	34
24	Patrick Roest	(Netherlands)	—	—	—	—	32	—	32
25	Bob de Vries	(Netherlands)	—	32	—	—	—	—	32
26	Shane Williamson	(Japan)	0	4	15	2	7	—	28
27	Nicola Tumolero	(Italy)	0	—	—	—	27	—	27
28	Dmitry Babenko	(Kazakhstan)	9	11	0	7	0	—	27
29	Michele Malfatti	(Italy)	—	—	9	11	5	—	25
30	Reyon Kay	(New Zealand)	6	0	3	15	—	—	24
31	Vitaly Mikhailov	(Belarus)	15	7	—	1	0	—	23
32	Danil Sinitsyn	(Russia)	—	—	7	9	4	—	20
33	Liu Yiming	(China)	—	—	—	—	19	—	19
34	Jan Szymański	(Poland)	18	—	0	—	0	—	18
35	Bob de Jong	(Netherlands)	—	—	18	—	—	—	18
36	Konrad Niedzwiedzki	(Poland)	3	—	—	—	15	—	18
37	Denis Yuskov	(Russia)	16	—	—	—	—	—	16
38	Wouter olde Heuvel	(Netherlands)	14	—	—	—	—	—	14
39	Stefan Waples	(Canada)	7	6	—	0	—	—	13
40	Sergey Gryaztsov	(Russia)	5	2	1	5	—	—	13
41	Sindre Henriksen	(Norway)	11	1	—	0	—	—	12
42	Sebastian Druszkiewicz	(Czech Republic)	—	—	—	—	11	—	11
43	Haralds Silovs	(Latvia)	—	—	11	—	—	—	11
44	Simen Spieler Nilsen	(Norway)	—	—	—	—	9	—	9
45	Benjamin Donnelly	(Canada)	2	—	—	—	6	—	8
46	Kim Min-seok	(South Korea)	—	—	6	—	—	—	6
47	Sun Longjiang	(China)	4	0	2	0	0	—	6
48	Joo Hyong-jun	(South Korea)	0	0	—	4	0	—	4
49	Kim Cheol-min	(South Korea)	0	0	4	—	0	—	4
50	Zbigniew Bródka	(Poland)	—	—	—	—	3	—	3
51	Takuro Ogawa	(Japan)	—	3	—	—	0	—	3
52	Sergey Trofimov	(Russia)	—	—	—	—	2	—	2
53	Shota Nakamura	(Japan)	—	—	—	—	1	—	1
