= 2015–16 ISU Speed Skating World Cup – World Cup 1 =

The first competition weekend of the 2015–16 ISU Speed Skating World Cup was held in the Olympic Oval in Calgary, Alberta, Canada, from Friday, 13 November, until Sunday, 15 November 2015.

The weekend saw five world records. On Saturday, Heather Richardson-Bergsma of the United States beat fellow American Brittany Bowe's 1000 m world record from 2013. Bowe, who skated in the pairing before Richardson, also skated better than the old record, and finished second, 3/100 behind Richardson. World records were also noted in the team sprints, as they were raced officially for the first time, with the Dutch team winning the men's race, and the Japanese team winning the women's race.

On Sunday, Bowe beat the 1500 m world record, held by Cindy Klassen of Canada since 2005. In the men's 500 metres, Russian Pavel Kulizhnikov set a new world record in the Sunday race, stripping Jeremy Wotherspoon of Canada of the record he had held since 2007. Kulizhnikov had previously won the Friday race in a time that was a new national record.

== Schedule ==
The detailed schedule of events:

Date	Session	Events	Comment
Friday, 13 November	Morning	09:00: 3000 m women 10:04: 500 m women (1); 10:44: 500 m men (1)	Division B
Friday, 13 November	Afternoon	12:30: 3000 m women 13:34: 500 m women (1); 13:59: 500 m men (1); 14:44: 5000 m men	Division A
Friday, 13 November	Afternoon	16:51: 5000 m men	Division B
Saturday, 14 November	Morning	09:30: 1000 m women 10:21: 1000 m men	Division B
Saturday, 14 November	Afternoon	12:30: 1000 m women 13:00: 1000 m men	Division A
Saturday, 14 November	Afternoon	13:55: Team pursuit men 14:55: Team pursuit women 15:54: Team sprint men 16:17: Team sprint women	
Sunday, 15 November	Morning	09:30: 1500 m women 10:35: 1500 m men	Division B
Sunday, 15 November	Afternoon	12:30: 1500 m women 13:12: 1500 m men 14:02: 500 m women (2); 14:27: 500 m men (2); 15:07: Mass start women 15:37: Mass start men	Division A
Sunday, 15 November	Afternoon	16:57: 500 m women (2); 17:39: 500 m men (2); 18:27: Mass start women 18:42: Mass start men	Division B

All times are MST (UTC−7).

== Medal summary ==
=== Men's events ===
Event	Race #	Gold	Time	Silver	Time	Bronze	Time	Report
500 m	1	Pavel Kulizhnikov; Russia	34.11	Mika Poutala; Finland	34.28	William Dutton; Canada	34.46	
500 m	2	Pavel Kulizhnikov; Russia	34.00; WR	William Dutton; Canada	34.25	Alex Boisvert-Lacroix; Canada	34.30	
1000 m		Gerben Jorritsma; Netherlands	1:07.20	Pavel Kulizhnikov; Russia	1:07.33	Kjeld Nuis; Netherlands	1:07.40	
1500 m		Denis Yuskov; Russia	1:41.88	Bart Swings; Belgium	1:42.480	Joey Mantia; United States	1:42.482	
5000 m		Sven Kramer; Netherlands	6:08.61	Jorrit Bergsma; Netherlands	6:10.44	Ted-Jan Bloemen; Canada	6:12.72	
Mass start		Bart Swings; Belgium	65 ^{A}	Jorrit Bergsma; Netherlands	45 ^{A}	Reyon Kay; New Zealand	25 ^{A}	
Team pursuit		Canada; Ted-Jan Bloemen; Jordan Belchos; Benjamin Donnelly	3:39.32	South Korea; Lee Seung-hoon; Kim Cheol-min; Joo Hyong-jun	3:39.60	Italy; Andrea Giovannini; Luca Stefani; Fabio Francolini	3:41.97	
Team sprint		Netherlands; Ronald Mulder; Kai Verbij; Stefan Groothuis	1:18.79; WR	United States; Mitchell Whitmore; Jonathan Garcia; Joey Mantia	1:19.39	Russia; Ruslan Murashov; Artyom Kuznetsov; Aleksey Yesin	1:19.59	

^{A} In mass start, race points are accumulated during the race. The skater with most race points is the winner.

=== Women's events ===
Event	Race #	Gold	Time	Silver	Time	Bronze	Time	Report
500 m	1	Lee Sang-hwa; South Korea	36.96	Zhang Hong; China	37.18	Brittany Bowe; United States	37.22	
500 m	2	Zhang Hong; China	36.94	Lee Sang-hwa; South Korea	36.99	Heather Richardson-Bergsma; United States	37.06	
1000 m		Heather Richardson-Bergsma; United States	1:12.51; WR	Brittany Bowe; United States	1:12.54	Zhang Hong; China	1:12.65	
1500 m		Brittany Bowe; United States	1:51.59; WR	Heather Richardson-Bergsma; United States	1:52.27	Martina Sáblíková; Czech Republic	1:54.18	
3000 m		Martina Sáblíková; Czech Republic	3:57.21	Irene Schouten; Netherlands	3:58.39	Natalya Voronina; Russia	3:58.78	
Mass start		Kim Bo-reum; South Korea	60 ^{A}	Irene Schouten; Netherlands	41 ^{A}	Ivanie Blondin; Canada	23 ^{A}	
Team pursuit		Netherlands; Marrit Leenstra; Antoinette de Jong; Marije Joling	2:56.11	Japan; Ayaka Kikuchi; Miho Takagi; Misaki Oshigiri	2:56.46	Russia; Olga Graf; Natalya Voronina; Elizaveta Kazelina	2:56.98	
Team sprint		Japan; Erina Kamiya; Maki Tsuji; Nao Kodaira	1:26.82; WR	China; Yu Jing; Zhang Hong; Li Qishi	1:27.08	Canada; Marsha Hudey; Noémie Fiset; Heather McLean	1:28.39	

^{A} In mass start, race points are accumulated during the race. The skater with most race points is the winner.

== Standings ==
The top ten standings in the contested cups after the weekend. The top five nations in the team pursuit and team sprint cups.

=== Men's cups ===
500 m

#	Name	Nat.	CGY1	CGY2	Total
1	Pavel Kulizhnikov	(Russia)	100	100	200
2	William Dutton	(Canada)	70	80	150
3	Mika Poutala	(Finland)	80	36	116
4	Ronald Mulder	(Netherlands)	60	40	100
5	Alex Boisvert-Lacroix	(Canada)	25	70	95
6	Laurent Dubreuil	(Canada)	36	45	81
7	Gilmore Junio	(Canada)	19	60	79
8	Yūya Oikawa	(Japan)	45	32	77
9	Mitchell Whitmore	(United States)	15	50	65
10	Ruslan Murashov	(Russia)	50	8	58

1000 m

#	Name	Nat.	CGY	Total
1	Gerben Jorritsma	(Netherlands)	100	100
2	Pavel Kulizhnikov	(Russia)	80	80
3	Kjeld Nuis	(Netherlands)	70	70
4	Joey Mantia	(United States)	60	60
5	Shani Davis	(United States)	50	50
6	Aleksey Yesin	(Russia)	45	45
7	Kai Verbij	(Netherlands)	40	40
8	Vincent De Haître	(Canada)	36	36
9	Denis Kuzin	(Kazakhstan)	32	32
10	Piotr Michalski	(Poland)	28	28

1500 m

#	Name	Nat.	CGY	Total
1	Denis Yuskov	(Russia)	100	100
2	Bart Swings	(Belgium)	80	80
3	Joey Mantia	(United States)	70	70
4	Kjeld Nuis	(Netherlands)	60	60
5	Konrad Niedźwiedzki	(Poland)	50	50
6	Thomas Krol	(Netherlands)	45	45
7	Sverre Lunde Pedersen	(Norway)	40	40
8	Shani Davis	(United States)	36	36
9	Gerben Jorritsma	(Netherlands)	32	32
10	Li Bailin	(China)	28	28

5000/10000 m

#	Name	Nat.	CGY	Total
1	Sven Kramer	(Netherlands)	100	100
2	Jorrit Bergsma	(Netherlands)	80	80
3	Ted-Jan Bloemen	(Canada)	70	70
4	Patrick Beckert	(Germany)	60	60
5	Bart Swings	(Belgium)	50	50
6	Douwe de Vries	(Netherlands)	45	45
7	Sverre Lunde Pedersen	(Norway)	40	40
8	Erik Jan Kooiman	(Netherlands)	35	35
9	Peter Michael	(New Zealand)	32	32
10	Aleksandr Rumyantsev	(Russia)	30	30

Mass start

#	Name	Nat.	CGY	Total
1	Bart Swings	(Belgium)	100	100
2	Jorrit Bergsma	(Netherlands)	80	80
3	Reyon Kay	(New Zealand)	70	70
4	Livio Wenger	(Switzerland)	60	60
5	Arjan Stroetinga	(Netherlands)	50	50
6	Shane Williamson	(Japan)	45	45
7	Peter Michael	(New Zealand)	40	40
8	Sun Longjiang	(China)	36	36
9	Andrea Giovannini	(Italy)	32	32
10	Fabio Francolini	(Italy)	28	28

Team pursuit

#	Country	CGY	Total
1	Canada	100	100
2	South Korea	80	80
3	Italy	70	70
4	Poland	60	60
5	Japan	50	50

Team sprint

#	Country	CGY	Total
1	Netherlands	100	100
2	United States	80	80
3	Russia	70	70
4	Japan	60	60
5	Kazakhstan	50	50

Grand World Cup

#	Name	Nat.	CGY	Total
1	Bart Swings	(Belgium)	230	230
2	Pavel Kulizhnikov	(Russia)	180	180
3	Jorrit Bergsma	(Netherlands)	160	160
4	Joey Mantia	(United States)	130	130
4	Kjeld Nuis	(Netherlands)	130	130
6	Gerben Jorritsma	(Netherlands)	100	100
6	Sven Kramer	(Netherlands)	100	100
6	Denis Yuskov	(Russia)	100	100
9	William Dutton	(Canada)	75	75
10	Ted-Jan Bloemen	(Canada)	70	70
10	Reyon Kay	(New Zealand)	70	70

=== Women's cups ===
500 m

#	Name	Nat.	CGY1	CGY2	Total
1	Lee Sang-hwa	(South Korea)	100	80	180
1	Zhang Hong	(China)	80	100	180
3	Brittany Bowe	(United States)	70	60	130
3	Heather Richardson-Bergsma	(United States)	60	70	130
5	Yu Jing	(China)	45	50	95
6	Vanessa Bittner	(Austria)	50	36	86
7	Jorien ter Mors	(Netherlands)	21	45	77
8	Erina Kamiya	(Japan)	36	40	76
9	Maki Tsuji	(Japan)	40	32	72
10	Olga Fatkulina	(Russia)	28	21	49

1000 m

#	Name	Nat.	CGY	Total
1	Heather Richardson-Bergsma	(United States)	100	100
2	Brittany Bowe	(United States)	80	80
3	Zhang Hong	(China)	70	70
4	Jorien ter Mors	(Netherlands)	60	60
5	Vanessa Bittner	(Austria)	50	50
6	Marrit Leenstra	(Netherlands)	45	45
7	Ida Njåtun	(Norway)	40	40
8	Karolína Erbanová	(Czech Republic)	36	36
9	Margot Boer	(Netherlands)	32	32
10	Lee Sang-hwa	(South Korea)	28	28

1500 m

#	Name	Nat.	CGY	Total
1	Brittany Bowe	(United States)	100	100
2	Heather Richardson-Bergsma	(United States)	80	80
3	Martina Sáblíková	(Czech Republic)	70	70
4	Ida Njåtun	(Norway)	60	60
5	Marrit Leenstra	(Netherlands)	50	50
6	Marije Joling	(Netherlands)	45	45
7	Li Qishi	(China)	40	40
8	Antoinette de Jong	(Netherlands)	36	36
9	Sanneke de Neeling	(Netherlands)	32	32
10	Misaki Oshigiri	(Japan)	28	28

3000/5000 m

#	Name	Nat.	CGY	Total
1	Martina Sáblíková	(Czech Republic)	100	100
2	Irene Schouten	(Netherlands)	80	80
3	Natalya Voronina	(Russia)	70	70
4	Jorien Voorhuis	(Netherlands)	60	60
5	Annouk van der Weijden	(Netherlands)	50	50
6	Marije Joling	(Netherlands)	45	45
7	Ivanie Blondin	(Canada)	40	40
8	Claudia Pechstein	(Germany)	35	35
9	Misaki Oshigiri	(Japan)	32	32
10	Olga Graf	(Russia)	30	30

Mass start

#	Name	Nat.	CGY	Total
1	Kim Bo-reum	(South Korea)	100	100
2	Irene Schouten	(Netherlands)	80	80
3	Ivanie Blondin	(Canada)	70	70
4	Martina Sáblíková	(Czech Republic)	60	60
5	Heather Richardson-Bergsma	(United States)	50	50
6	Nikola Zdráhalová	(Czech Republic)	45	45
7	Park Do-yeong	(South Korea)	40	40
8	Miho Takagi	(Japan)	36	36
9	Janneke Ensing	(Netherlands)	32	32
10	Nana Takagi	(Japan)	28	28

Team pursuit

#	Country	CGY	Total
1	Netherlands	100	100
2	Japan	80	80
3	Russia	70	70
4	Canada	60	60
5	South Korea	50	50

Team sprint

#	Country	CGY	Total
1	Japan	100	100
2	China	80	80
3	Canada	70	70
4	Netherlands	60	60
5	Belarus	50	50

Grand World Cup

#	Name	Nat.	CGY	Total
1	Heather Richardson-Bergsma	(United States)	295	295
2	Brittany Bowe	(United States)	245	245
3	Martina Sáblíková	(Czech Republic)	230	230
4	Irene Schouten	(Netherlands)	160	160
4	Zhang Hong	(China)	160	160
6	Kim Bo-reum	(South Korea)	100	100
7	Lee Sang-hwa	(South Korea)	90	90
8	Vanessa Bittner	(Austria)	75	75
9	Ivanie Blondin	(Canada)	70	70
9	Natalya Voronina	(Russia)	70	70
