= 2015–16 ISU Speed Skating World Cup – World Cup 1 – Men's mass start =

Athletic speed skating competitive event

The men's mass start race of the 2015–16 ISU Speed Skating World Cup 1, arranged in the Olympic Oval, in Calgary, Alberta, Canada, was held on 15 November 2015.

Bart Swings of Belgium won the race, while Jorrit Bergsma of the Netherlands came second, and Reyon Kay of New Zealand came third. Viktor Hald Thorup of Denmark won the Division B race.

== Results ==
The race took place on Sunday, 15 November, in the afternoon session, with Division A scheduled at 15:37, and Division B scheduled at 18:42.

=== Division A ===
				Race points							
Rank	Name	Nat.	Laps	Split 1	Split 2	Split 3	Finish	Total	Time	WC points	GWC points
1st place, gold medalist(s)	Bart Swings	(Belgium)	16		5		60	65	7:31.30	100	100
2nd place, silver medalist(s)	Jorrit Bergsma	(Netherlands)	16	5			40	45	7:33.20	80	80
3rd place, bronze medalist(s)	Reyon Kay	(New Zealand)	16			5	20	25	7:34.17	70	70
4	Livio Wenger	(Switzerland)	16			3		3	7:37.50	60	60
5	Arjan Stroetinga	(Netherlands)	16		3			3	7:37.68	50	50
6	Shane Williamson	(Japan)	16	3				3	7:58.42	45	—
7	Peter Michael	(New Zealand)	16	1				1	7:42.68	40	
8	Sun Longjiang	(China)	16		1			1	7:46.65	36	
9	Andrea Giovannini	(Italy)	16			1		1	7:52.69	32	
10	Fabio Francolini	(Italy)	16						7:37.96	28	
11	K. C. Boutiette	(United States)	16						7:38.66	24	
12	Jordan Belchos	(Canada)	16						7:42.63	21	
13	Robert Watson	(Canada)	16						7:43.42	18	
14	Joo Hyung-joon	(South Korea)	16						7:45.55	16	
15	Armin Hager	(Austria)	16						7:46.05	14	
16	Vitaly Mikhailov	(Belarus)	16						7:46.07	12	
17	Shota Nakamura	(Japan)	16						7:53.59	10	
18	Yevgeny Seryaev	(Russia)	16						8:00.25	8	
19	Hubert Hirschbichler	(Germany)	16						8:07.98	6	
20	Linus Heidegger	(Austria)	16						8:10.16	5	
21	Haralds Silovs	(Latvia)	16						7:11.39	4	
22	Jan Szymański	(Poland)	5						2:39.91	3	

=== Division B ===
				Race points						
Rank	Name	Nat.	Laps	Split 1	Split 2	Split 3	Finish	Total	Time	WC points
1	Viktor Hald Thorup	(Denmark)	16		3	5	60	68	7:47.11	25
2	Kim Cheol-min	(South Korea)	16				40	40	7:51.83	19
3	Jan Blokhuijsen	(Netherlands)	16				20	20	7:52.07	15
4	Takuro Ogawa	(Japan)	16	1	5	3		9	8:00.73	11
5	Mathias Vosté	(Belgium)	16	5				5	8:09.16	8
6	Anton Kapustin	(Belarus)	16	3	1			4	8:08.61	6
7	Marcin Bachanek	(Poland)	16			1		1	8:03.83	4
8	Joey Mantia	(United States)	16						7:52.31	2
9	Dmitry Babenko	(Kazakhstan)	16						7:52.79	1
10	Nicola Tumolero	(Italy)	16						7:53.10	—
11	Stefan Waples	(Canada)	16						7:54.50	
12	Mario Valencia	(Colombia)	16						7:58.40	
13	Martin Hänggi	(Switzerland)	16						7:58.59	
14	Iñigo Vidondo	(Spain)	13						7:35.04	
