= 2015–16 ISU Speed Skating World Cup – World Cup 3 – Men's mass start =

The men's mass start race of the 2015–16 ISU Speed Skating World Cup 3, arranged in Eisstadion Inzell, in Inzell, Germany, was held on 6 December 2015.

Alexis Contin of France won the race, while Jorrit Bergsma of the Netherlands came second, and Fabio Francolini of Italy came third. Lee Seung-hoon of South Korea won the Division B race.

== Results ==
The race took place on Sunday, 6 December, with Division A scheduled in the afternoon session, at 17:17, and Division B scheduled in the evening session, at 18:39.

=== Division A ===
				Race points							
Rank	Name	Nat.	Laps	Split 1	Split 2	Split 3	Finish	Total	Time	WC points	GWC points
1st place, gold medalist(s)	Alexis Contin	(France)	16				60	60	7:33.37	100	100
2nd place, silver medalist(s)	Jorrit Bergsma	(Netherlands)	16		3	5	40	48	7:33.76	80	80
3rd place, bronze medalist(s)	Fabio Francolini	(Italy)	16		1	1	20	22	7:34.06	70	70
4	Haralds Silovs	(Latvia)	16		5			5	7:34.10	60	60
5	Arjan Stroetinga	(Netherlands)	16	5				5	7:41.73	50	50
6	Robert Watson	(Canada)	16	3				3	7:50.82	45	—
7	Reyon Kay	(New Zealand)	16			3		3	7:57.39	40	
8	Andrea Giovannini	(Italy)	16	1				1	7:49.26	36	
9	Jordan Belchos	(Canada)	16						7:35.38	32	
10	Peter Michael	(New Zealand)	16						7:37.20	28	
11	Kim Cheol-min	(South Korea)	16						7:37.95	24	
12	Joey Mantia	(United States)	16						7:39.41	21	
13	Joo Hyung-joon	(South Korea)	16						7:39.59	18	
14	K. C. Boutiette	(United States)	16						7:40.77	16	
15	Viktor Hald Thorup	(Denmark)	16						7:40.91	14	
16	Armin Hager	(Austria)	16						7:40.95	12	
17	Yevgeny Seryaev	(Russia)	16						7:41.05	10	
18	Livio Wenger	(Switzerland)	16						7:41.27	8	
19	Shane Williamson	(Japan)	16						7:41.29	6	
20	Shota Nakamura	(Japan)	16						7:42.37	5	
21	Mathias Vosté	(Belgium)	16						7:42.56	4	
22	Sun Longjiang	(China)	16						7:42.57	3	
23	Linus Heidegger	(Austria)	16						7:43.25	2	
24	Vitaly Mikhailov	(Belarus)	16						7:46.88	1	

=== Division B ===
				Race points						
Rank	Name	Nat.	Laps	Split 1	Split 2	Split 3	Finish	Total	Time	WC points
1	Lee Seung-hoon	(South Korea)	16				60	60	7:59.97	25
2	Jan Blokhuijsen	(Netherlands)	16			5	40	45	8:00.45	19
3	Nicola Tumolero	(Italy)	16			1	20	21	8:01.20	15
4	Andres Campo	(Colombia)	16	5	3			8	8:12.63	11
5	Joshua Capponi	(Australia)	16	1	5			6	8:12.96	8
6	Martin Hänggi	(Switzerland)	16	3	1			4	8:29.78	6
7	Tormod Bjørnetun Haugen	(Norway)	16			3		3	8:10.03	4
8	Jan Szymański	(Poland)	16						8:02.61	2
9	Takuro Ogawa	(Japan)	16						8:02.68	1
10	Dmitry Babenko	(Kazakhstan)	16						8:04.12	—
11	Jonas Pflug	(Germany)	16						8:06.37	
12	Yang Fan	(China)	16						8:06.99	
13	Marcin Bachanek	(Poland)	16						8:11.96	
14	Konstantin Nikitin	(Russia)	16						8:12.17	
15	Olivier Jean	(Canada)	16						8:17.63	
16	Mathias Hauer	(Austria)	16						8:24.82	
17	Verneri Kinnunen	(Finland)	16						8:32.32	
18	Iñigo Vidondo	(Spain)	13						7:04.29	
19	Håvard Bøkko	(Norway)							DNS	
