= 2015–16 ISU Speed Skating World Cup – World Cup 4 – Men's mass start =

The men's mass start race of the 2015–16 ISU Speed Skating World Cup 4, arranged in the Thialf arena in Heerenveen, Netherlands, was held on 13 December 2015.

Arjan Stroetinga of the Netherlands won the race, while Fabio Francolini of Italy came second, and Lee Seung-hoon of South Korea came third. Yan Fang of China won the Division B race.

== Results ==
The race took place on Sunday, 13 December, with Division A scheduled at 17:27, and Division B scheduled at 18:05 (both in the afternoon session).

=== Division A ===
				Race points							
Rank	Name	Nat.	Laps	Split 1	Split 2	Split 3	Finish	Total	Time	WC points	GWC points
1st place, gold medalist(s)	Arjan Stroetinga	(Netherlands)	16		3		60	63	7:22.37	100	100
2nd place, silver medalist(s)	Fabio Francolini	(Italy)	16				40	40	7:22.74	80	80
3rd place, bronze medalist(s)	Lee Seung-hoon	(South Korea)	16				20	20	7:23.13	70	70
4	Bart Swings	(Belgium)	16		5			5	7:23.50	60	60
5	Alexis Contin	(France)	16			5		5	7:26.90	50	50
6	Mathias Vosté	(Belgium)	16	5				5	7:53.71	45	—
7	Jordan Belchos	(Canada)	16			3		3	7:31.98	40	
8	Jorrit Bergsma	(Netherlands)	16		1			3	7:23.27	36	
9	Sverre Lunde Pedersen	(Norway)	16			1		1	7:31.84	32	
10	Robert Watson	(Canada)	16	1				1	7:48.40	28	
11	Nicola Tumolero	(Italy)	16						7:24.64	24	
12	Joey Mantia	(United States)	16						7:27.77	21	
13	Reyon Kay	(New Zealand)	16						7:29.95	18	
14	Sun Longjiang	(China)	16						7:31.98	16	
15	Viktor Hald Thorup	(Denmark)	16						7:32.16	14	
16	Livio Wenger	(Switzerland)	16						7:40.38	12	
17	Shota Nakamura	(Japan)	16						7:44.26	10	
18	Peter Michael	(New Zealand)	16						7:44.59	8	
19	Vitaly Mikhailov	(Belarus)	16						7:44.64	6	
20	Yevgeny Seryaev	(Russia)	16						7:45.54	5	
21	Armin Hager	(Austria)	16						7:46.33	4	
22	Kim Cheol-min	(South Korea)	12	3					6:18.15	3	
23	Shane Williamson	(Japan)	8						4:36.39	2	
24	K. C. Boutiette	(United States)	—						DQ		

=== Division B ===
				Race points						
Rank	Name	Nat.	Laps	Split 1	Split 2	Split 3	Finish	Total	Time	WC points
1	Yang Fan	(China)	16				60	60	8:06.89	25
2	Jan Blokhuijsen	(Netherlands)	16	3			40	43	8:07.58	19
3	Olivier Jean	(Canada)	16				20	20	8:07.70	15
4	Stefan Due Schmidt	(Denmark)	16		5	3		8	8:22.33	11
5	Jonas Pflug	(Germany)	16		3	5		8	8:28.77	8
6	Linus Heidegger	(Austria)	16	5	1			6	8:14.72	6
7	Håvard Bøkko	(Norway)	16			1		1	8:08.60	4
8	Joo Hyung-joon	(South Korea)	16	1				1	8:08.65	2
9	Marcin Bachanek	(Poland)	16		1			1	8:37.55	1
10	Dmitry Babenko	(Kazakhstan)	16						8:08.32	—
11	Konstantin Nikitin	(Russia)	16						8:08.96	
12	Takuro Ogawa	(Japan)	16						8:09.56	
13	Tormod Bjørnetun Haugen	(Norway)	16						8:10.30	
14	Adrian Wielgat	(Poland)	16						8:18.91	
15	Joshua Capponi	(Australia)	16						8:19.07	
16	Verneri Kinnunen	(Finland)	16						8:28.14	
17	Andres Campo	(Colombia)	16						8:33.61	
18	Oliver Grob	(Switzerland)	15						8:19.30	
