= 2015–16 ISU Speed Skating World Cup – World Cup 2 – Men's 10000 metres =

The men's 10000 metres race of the 2015–16 ISU Speed Skating World Cup 2, arranged in the Utah Olympic Oval, in Salt Lake City, United States, was held on November 21, 2015.

Ted-Jan Bloemen of Canada won the race on a new world record, while previous holder Sven Kramer of the Netherlands came second, and Jorrit Bergsma of the Netherlands came third. Bob de Vries of the Netherlands won the Division B race on a time that would have given him second place in Division A.

== Results ==
The race took place on Saturday, November 21, in the afternoon session, with Division A scheduled at 13:00, and Division B scheduled at 17:53.

=== Division A ===
Rank	Name	Nat.	Pair	Lane	Time	WC points	GWC points
1st place, gold medalist(s)	Ted-Jan Bloemen	(Canada)	5	i	12:36.30 WR	100	100
2nd place, silver medalist(s)	Sven Kramer	(Netherlands)	6	i	12:44.26	80	80
3rd place, bronze medalist(s)	Jorrit Bergsma	(Netherlands)	6	o	12:53.99	70	70
4	Patrick Beckert	(Germany)	5	o	12:55.01 NR	60	60
5	Bart Swings	(Belgium)	4	i	12:57.31 NR	50	50
6	Peter Michael	(New Zealand)	3	o	12:58.07 NR	45	—
7	Erik Jan Kooiman	(Netherlands)	3	i	12:58.24	40	
8	Andrea Giovannini	(Italy)	1	i	13:07.20 NR	35	
9	Jordan Belchos	(Canada)	2	o	13:09.06	30	
10	Sverre Lunde Pedersen	(Norway)	4	o	13:09.79	25	
11	Alexis Contin	(France)	1	o	13:34.79	21	
12	Aleksandr Rumyantsev	(Russia)	2	i	DNF		

Note: WR = world record, NR = national record.

=== Division B ===
Rank	Name	Nat.	Pair	Lane	Time	WC points
1	Bob de Vries	(Netherlands)	2	i	12:43.57	32
2	Arjan Stroetinga	(Netherlands)	3	i	12:51.92	27
3	Moritz Geisreiter	(Germany)	11	i	12:55.47	23
4	Håvard Bøkko	(Norway)	3	o	13:01.54	19
5	Lee Seung-hoon	(South Korea)	11	o	13:01.78	15
6	Dmitry Babenko	(Kazakhstan)	8	i	13:13.80	11
7	Yevgeny Seryaev	(Russia)	9	i	13:16.60	9
8	Vitaly Mikhailov	(Belarus)	10	o	13:19.59 NR	7
9	Stefan Waples	(Canada)	8	o	13:21.48	6
10	Viktor Hald Thorup	(Denmark)	10	i	13:25.30 NR	5
11	Shane Williamson	(Japan)	6	o	13:25.69	4
12	Takuro Ogawa	(Japan)	2	o	13:27.79	3
13	Sergey Gryaztsov	(Russia)	7	o	13:31.06	2
14	Sindre Henriksen	(Norway)	9	o	13:40.16	1
15	Joo Hyung-joon	(South Korea)	5	o	13:41.01	—
16	Fabio Francolini	(Italy)	1	o	13:41.32	
17	Sun Longjiang	(China)	6	i	13:46.21	
18	Kim Cheol-min	(South Korea)	4	i	13:46.49	
19	Linus Heidegger	(Austria)	5	i	13:56.64	
20	Aoi Yokoyama	(Japan)	4	o	14:00.96	
21	Martin Hänggi	(Switzerland)	1	i	14:07.40	
22	Reyon Kay	(New Zealand)	7	i	DNF	

Note: NR = national record.
