= 2015–16 ISU Speed Skating World Cup – World Cup 1 – Men's 5000 metres =

The men's 5000 metres race of the 2015–16 ISU Speed Skating World Cup 1, arranged in the Olympic Oval, in Calgary, Alberta, Canada, was held on 13 November 2015.

Sven Kramer of the Netherlands won the race, with compatriot Jorrit Bergsma in second place, and Ted-Jan Bloemen of Canada in third place. Peter Michael of New Zealand won the Division B race.

== Results ==
The race took place on Friday, 13 November, in the afternoon session, with Division A scheduled at 14:44, and Division B scheduled at 16:51.

=== Division A ===
Rank	Name	Nat.	Pair	Lane	Time	WC points	GWC points
1st place, gold medalist(s)	Sven Kramer	(Netherlands)	8	o	6:08.61	100	100
2nd place, silver medalist(s)	Jorrit Bergsma	(Netherlands)	7	i	6:10.44	80	80
3rd place, bronze medalist(s)	Ted-Jan Bloemen	(Canada)	1	o	6:12.72 NR	70	70
4	Patrick Beckert	(Germany)	7	o	6:13.14	60	60
5	Bart Swings	(Belgium)	6	o	6:14.04	50	50
6	Douwe de Vries	(Netherlands)	6	i	6:17.16	45	—
7	Sverre Lunde Pedersen	(Norway)	8	i	6:17.53	40	
8	Erik Jan Kooiman	(Netherlands)	4	o	6:17.95	35	
9	Aleksandr Rumyantsev	(Russia)	5	i	6:21.38	30	
10	Andrea Giovannini	(Italy)	3	i	6:21.77	25	
11	Lee Seung-hoon	(South Korea)	3	o	6:21.88	21	
12	Jan Szymański	(Poland)	4	i	6:24.21	18	
13	Denis Yuskov	(Russia)	2	o	6:24.43	16	
14	Wouter olde Heuvel	(Netherlands)	5	o	6:25.92	14	
15	Yevgeny Seryaev	(Russia)	1	i	6:31.39	12	
16	Håvard Bøkko	(Norway)	2	i	DNS		

Note: NR = national record.

=== Division B ===
Rank	Name	Nat.	Pair	Lane	Time	WC points
1	Peter Michael	(New Zealand)	2	o	6:15.19 NR	32
2	Jordan Belchos	(Canada)	12	i	6:17.16	27
3	Moritz Geisreiter	(Germany)	12	o	6:17.31	23
4	Viktor Hald Thorup	(Denmark)	9	i	6:22.37 NR	19
5	Vitaly Mikhailov	(Belarus)	4	i	6:22.52 NR	15
6	Sindre Henriksen	(Norway)	9	o	6:24.33	11
7	Dmitry Babenko	(Kazakhstan)	6	i	6:24.43	9
8	Stefan Waples	(Canada)	4	o	6:24.61	7
9	Reyon Kay	(New Zealand)	10	i	6:25.03	6
10	Sergey Gryaztsov	(Russia)	13	o	6:27.39	5
11	Sun Longjiang	(China)	10	o	6:27.99	4
12	Konrad Niedźwiedzki	(Poland)	11	o	6:28.21	3
13	Bejamin Donnelly	(Canada)	6	o	6:28.302	2
14	Ryosuke Tsuchiya	(Japan)	8	i	6:28.306	1
15	Nicola Tumolero	(Italy)	7	i	6:30.31	—
16	Livio Wenger	(Switzerland)	7	o	6:30.65	
17	Shane Williamson	(Japan)	11	i	6:32.48	
18	Linus Heidegger	(Austria)	3	i	6:33.62	
19	Joo Hyung-joon	(South Korea)	8	o	6:33.74	
20	Kim Cheol-min	(South Korea)	5	i	6:34.69	
21	Adrian Wielgat	(Poland)	5	o	6:36.44	
22	Ian Quinn	(United States)	3	o	6:36.77	
23	Aoi Yokoyama	(Japan)	13	i	6:37.38	
24	Antoine Gélinas-Beaulieu	(Canada)	1	i	6:38.07	
25	Iñigo Vidondo	(Spain)	2	i	6:43.71 NR	

Note: NR = national record.
