= 2014–15 ISU Speed Skating World Cup – World Cup 4 – Men's mass start =

The men's mass start race of the 2014–15 ISU Speed Skating World Cup 4, arranged in the Thialf arena in Heerenveen, Netherlands, was held on 14 December 2014.

Jorrit Bergsma of the Netherlands won the race, while Lee Seung-hoon of South Korea came second, and Fabio Francolini of Italy came third.

== Results ==
The race took place on Sunday, 14 December, scheduled in the afternoon session, at 17:31.

| | | | | Race points | | | | | | | |
| Rank | Name | Nat. | Laps | Split 1 | Split 2 | Split 3 | Finish | Total | Time | WC points | GWC points |
|---|---|---|---|---|---|---|---|---|---|---|---|
| 1st place, gold medalist(s) | Jorrit Bergsma | (Netherlands) | 16 | | 5 | 5 | 60 | 70 | 7:32.92 | 100 | 100 |
| 2nd place, silver medalist(s) | Lee Seung-hoon | (South Korea) | 16 | | | | 40 | 40 | 7:34.57 | 80 | 80 |
| 3rd place, bronze medalist(s) | Fabio Francolini | (Italy) | 16 | | | | 20 | 20 | 7:34.60 | 70 | 70 |
| 4 | Tyler Derraugh | (Canada) | 16 | 5 | | | | 5 | 7:46.38 | 60 | 60 |
| 5 | Andrea Giovannini | (Italy) | 16 | 3 | | 1 | | 4 | 7:46.33 | 50 | 50 |
| 6 | Patrick Beckert | (Germany) | 16 | | | 3 | | 3 | 7:39.60 | 45 | — |
| 7 | Sun Longjiang | (China) | 16 | | 3 | | | 3 | 7:40.44 | 40 | |
| 8 | Haralds Silovs | (Latvia) | 16 | 1 | | | | 1 | 7:35.05 | 36 | |
| 9 | Marco Weber | (Germany) | 16 | | 1 | | | 1 | 7:40.65 | 32 | |
| 10 | Alexis Contin | (France) | 16 | | | | | 0 | 7:34.65 | 28 | |
| 11 | Bart Swings | (Belgium) | 16 | | | | | 0 | 7:34.69 | 24 | |
| 12 | Kim Cheol-min | (South Korea) | 16 | | | | | 0 | 7:34.98 | 21 | |
| 13 | Robert Watson | (Canada) | 16 | | | | | 0 | 7:35.27 | 18 | |
| 14 | Arjan Stroetinga | (Netherlands) | 16 | | | | | 0 | 7:36.05 | 16 | |
| 15 | Shane Williamson | (Japan) | 16 | | | | | 0 | 7:37.45 | 14 | |
| 16 | Peter Michael | (New Zealand) | 16 | | | | | 0 | 7:39.07 | 12 | |
| 17 | Jeffrey Swider-Peltz | (United States) | 16 | | | | | 0 | 7:39.33 | 10 | |
| 18 | Yevgeny Seryaev | (Russia) | 16 | | | | | 0 | 7:39.73 | 8 | |
| 19 | Roland Cieslak | (Poland) | 16 | | | | | 0 | 7:40.09 | 6 | |
| 20 | Dmitry Babenko | (Kazakhstan) | 16 | | | | | 0 | 7:41.10 | 5 | |
| 21 | Ryosuke Tsuchiya | (Japan) | 16 | | | | | 0 | 7:41.24 | 4 | |
| 22 | Armin Hager | (Austria) | 16 | | | | | 0 | 7:42.25 | 3 | |
| 23 | Stefan Due Schmidt | (Denmark) | 16 | | | | | 0 | 7:43.51 | 2 | |
| 24 | Martin Hänggi | (Switzerland) | 16 | | | | | 0 | 7:45.07 | 1 | |
| 25 | Vitaly Mikhailov | (Belarus) | 16 | | | | | 0 | 7:45.63 | — | |
| 26 | Konrád Nagy | (Hungary) | 16 | | | | | 0 | 7:49.32 | | |
| 27 | Bram Smallenbroek | (Austria) | 16 | | | | | 0 | 7:53.38 | | |
| 28 | Joshua Capponi | (Australia) | 16 | | | | | 0 | 8:06.39 | | |
