= 2014–15 ISU Speed Skating World Cup – World Cup 3 – Men's mass start =

The men's mass start race of the 2014–15 ISU Speed Skating World Cup 3, arranged in Sportforum Hohenschönhausen, in Berlin, Germany, was held on 7 December 2014.

Lee Seung-hoon of South Korea won the race, while Arjan Stroetinga of the Netherlands came second, and Bart Swings of Belgium came third.

== Results ==
The race took place on Sunday, 7 December, scheduled in the afternoon session, at 16:14.

				Race points							
Rank	Name	Nat.	Laps	Split 1	Split 2	Split 3	Finish	Total	Time	WC points	GWC points
1st place, gold medalist(s)	Lee Seung-hoon	(South Korea)	16			1	60	61	7:42.33	100	100
2nd place, silver medalist(s)	Arjan Stroetinga	(Netherlands)	16				40	40	7:42.77	80	80
3rd place, bronze medalist(s)	Bart Swings	(Belgium)	16		5		20	25	7:42.88	70	70
4	Jorrit Bergsma	(Netherlands)	16		3	5		8	7:48.79	60	60
5	Robert Watson	(Canada)	16	5				5	8:14.81	50	50
6	Shane Williamson	(Japan)	16			3		3	7:50.00	45	—
7	Nicola Tumolero	(Italy)	16	3				3	8:03.74	40	
8	Andrea Giovannini	(Italy)	16	1				1	7:47.87	36	
9	Bram Smallenbroek	(Austria)	16		1			1	8:12.81	32	
10	Alexis Contin	(France)	16					0	7:43.10	28	
11	Haralds Silovs	(Latvia)	16					0	7:43.11	24	
12	Kim Cheol-min	(South Korea)	16					0	7:46.83	21	
13	Sun Longjiang	(China)	16					0	7:47.44	18	
14	Marco Weber	(Germany)	16					0	7:47.46	16	
15	Ryosuke Tsuchiya	(Japan)	16					0	7:47.76	14	
16	Jeffrey Swider-Peltz	(United States)	16					0	7:48.76	12	
17	Vitaly Mikhailov	(Belarus)	16					0	7:48.88	10	
18	Tyler Derraugh	(Canada)	16					0	7:48.90	8	
19	Alexej Baumgärtner	(Germany)	16					0	7:49.91	6	
20	Yevgeny Seryaev	(Russia)	16					0	7:49.93	5	
21	Fredrik van der Horst	(Norway)	16					0	7:50.27	4	
22	Peter Michael	(New Zealand)	16					0	7:54.06	3	
23	Stefan Due Schmidt	(Denmark)	16					0	7:56.66	2	
24	Roland Cieslak	(Poland)	16					0	7:59.38	1	
25	Joshua Capponi	(Australia)	16					0	8:08.38	—	
26	Martin Hänggi	(Switzerland)	16					0	8:13.70		
27	Konrád Nagy	(Hungary)	15					0	8:04.55		
28	Armin Hager	(Austria)	4					0	2:53.41		
