= 2013–14 ISU Speed Skating World Cup – World Cup 4 – Men's team pursuit =

The men's team pursuit race of the 2013–14 ISU Speed Skating World Cup 4, arranged in Sportforum Hohenschönhausen, in Berlin, Germany, was held on 7 December 2013.

The Dutch team took their third consecutive victory for the season, while the South Korean team came second, and the Polish team came third.

== Results ==
The race took place on Saturday, 7 December, in the afternoon session, scheduled at 15:30.

Rank	Country	Skaters	Pair	Lane	Time	WC points
1st place, gold medalist(s)	Netherlands	Douwe de Vries; Jan Blokhuijsen; Jorrit Bergsma	7	i	3:41.46	100
2nd place, silver medalist(s)	South Korea	Lee Seung-hoon; Kim Cheol-min; Joo Hyong-jun	6	i	3:41.92	80
3rd place, bronze medalist(s)	Poland	Zbigniew Bródka; Konrad Niedźwiedzki; Jan Szymański	4	i	3:43.81	70
4	Norway	Sverre Lunde Pedersen; Håvard Bøkko; Simen Spieler Nilsen	6	o	3:44.94	60
5	Germany	Patrick Beckert; Alexej Baumgärtner; Robert Lehmann	3	i	3:46.09	50
6	Russia	Ivan Skobrev; Denis Yuskov; Yevgeny Lalenkov	4	o	3:46.20	45
7	France	Benjamin Macé; Ewen Fernandez; Alexis Contin	5	o	3:46.67	40
8	Canada	Lucas Makowsky; Jordan Belchos; Mathieu Giroux	5	i	3:46.80	35
9	United States	Jonathan Kuck; Joey Mantia; Shani Davis	7	o	3:47.67	30
10	Italy	Andrea Giovannini; Marco Cignini; Luca Stefani	3	o	3:48.60	25
11	Japan	Shota Nakamura; Shane Williamson; Seitaro Ichinohe	2	i	3:51.18	21
12	Austria	Bram Smallenbroek; Armin Hager; Linus Heidegger	1	i	3:53.55	18
13	New Zealand	Shane Dobbin; Kalon Dobbin; Reyon Kay	2	o	3:55.51	16
14	China	Sun Longjiang; Tian Guojun; Liu Yan	1	o	3:58.70	14
