= 2015–16 ISU Speed Skating World Cup – World Cup 4 – Men's 5000 metres =

The men's 5000 metres race of the 2015–16 ISU Speed Skating World Cup 4, arranged in the Thialf arena in Heerenveen, Netherlands, was held on 12 December 2015.

Sven Kramer of the Netherlands won the race, while compatriot Jorrit Bergsma came second, and Bart Swings of Belgium came third. Jonas Pflug of Germany won the Division B race.

== Results ==
The race took place on Saturday, 12 December, with Division B scheduled in the morning session, at 11:32, and Division A scheduled in the afternoon session, at 14:46.

=== Division A ===
Rank	Name	Nat.	Pair	Lane	Time	WC points	GWC points
1st place, gold medalist(s)	Sven Kramer	(Netherlands)	8	o	6:14.99	100	100
2nd place, silver medalist(s)	Jorrit Bergsma	(Netherlands)	8	i	6:16.41	80	80
3rd place, bronze medalist(s)	Bart Swings	(Belgium)	5	o	6:20.80	70	70
4	Sverre Lunde Pedersen	(Norway)	7	o	6:20.98	60	60
5	Alexis Contin	(France)	2	o	6:22.39	50	50
6	Douwe de Vries	(Netherlands)	5	i	6:23.04	45	—
7	Erik Jan Kooiman	(Netherlands)	6	o	6:23.93	40	
8	Patrick Beckert	(Germany)	7	i	6:24.64	35	
9	Arjan Stroetinga	(Netherlands)	4	i	6:25.19	30	
10	Peter Michael	(New Zealand)	6	i	6:25.64	25	
11	Andrea Giovannini	(Italy)	4	o	6:28.43	21	
12	Håvard Bøkko	(Norway)	2	i	6:29.00	18	
13	Jordan Belchos	(Canada)	3	o	6:29.22	16	
14	Moritz Geisreiter	(Germany)	3	i	6:32.72	14	
15	Ole Bjørnsmoen Næss	(Norway)	1	o	6:33.06	12	
16	Ryosuke Tsuchiya	(Japan)	1	i	6:34.04	10	

=== Division B ===
Rank	Name	Nat.	Pair	Lane	Time	WC points
1	Jonas Pflug	(Germany)	10	i	6:29.10	32
2	Aleksandr Rumyantsev	(Russia)	13	o	6:29.67	27
3	Yevgeny Seryaev	(Russia)	12	i	6:30.30	23
4	Viktor Hald Thorup	(Denmark)	12	o	6:30.98	19
5	Reyon Kay	(New Zealand)	8	o	6:31.06	15
6	Michele Malfatti	(Italy)	8	i	6:32.96	11
7	Danil Sinitsyn	(Russia)	7	o	6:33.05	9
8	Dmitry Babenko	(Kazakhstan)	11	o	6:33.63	7
9	Thomas-Henrik Søfteland	(Norway)	6	o	6:33.92	6
10	Sergey Gryaztsov	(Russia)	7	i	6:34.14	5
11	Joo Hyung-joon	(South Korea)	5	o	6:35.08	4
12	Lee Seung-hoon	(South Korea)	13	i	6:36.96	3
13	Shane Williamson	(Japan)	10	o	6:37.06	2
14	Vitaly Mikhailov	(Belarus)	11	i	6:37.14	1
15	Sindre Henriksen	(Norway)	9	o	6:37.21	—
16	Linus Heidegger	(Austria)	5	i	6:38.36	
17	Sun Longjiang	(China)	6	i	6:39.53	
18	Ian Quinn	(United States)	4	o	6:43.89	
19	Piotr Puszkarski	(Poland)	3	o	6:49.25	
20	Stefan Waples	(Canada)	9	i	6:50.03	
21	Adrian Wielgat	(Poland)	4	i	6:50.09	
22	Martin Hänggi	(Switzerland)	2	i	6:52.33	
23	Aoi Yokoyama	(Japan)	3	i	6:52.61	
24	Tuomas Rahnasto	(Finland)	1	o	7:00.09	
25	Marcin Bachanek	(Poland)	1	i	7:00.10	
26	Konrád Nagy	(Hungary)	2	o	DNS	
