= 2015–16 ISU Speed Skating World Cup – World Cup 1 – Men's team pursuit =

Sports competition

The men's team pursuit race of the 2015–16 ISU Speed Skating World Cup 1, arranged in the Olympic Oval, in Calgary, Alberta, Canada, was held on 14 November 2015.

The Canadian team won the race, while the South Korean team came second, and the Italian team came third.

== Results ==
The race took place on Saturday, 14 November, in the afternoon session, scheduled at 13:55.

Rank	Country	Skaters	Pair	Lane	Time	WC points
1st place, gold medalist(s)	Canada	Ted-Jan Bloemen; Jordan Belchos; Benjamin Donnelly	4	c	3:39.32	100
2nd place, silver medalist(s)	South Korea	Lee Seung-hoon; Kim Cheol-min; Joo Hyong-jun	6	f	3:39.60	80
3rd place, bronze medalist(s)	Italy	Andrea Giovannini; Luca Stefani; Fabio Francolini	5	c	3:41.97	70
4	Poland	Zbigniew Bródka; Konrad Niedźwiedzki; Jan Szymański	5	f	3:42.46	60
5	Japan	Shota Nakamura; Takuro Oda; Shane Williamson	3	c	3:43.89	50
6	Russia	Aleksandr Rumyantsev; Sergey Gryaztsov; Sergey Trofimov	4	f	3:44.01	45
7	Germany	Hubert Hirschbichler; Patrick Beckert; Moritz Geisreiter	2	f	3:48.27	40
8	United States	Jeffrey Swider-Peltz; Ian Quinn; Chase Reichmann	1	c	3:51.50	35
9	China	Sun Longjiang; Li Bailin; Tian Guojun	2	c	3:52.92	30
10	Switzerland	Martin Hänggi; Livio Wenger; Christian Oberbichler	1	f	3:57.75 NR	25
11	Netherlands	Jan Blokhuijsen; Douwe de Vries; Arjan Stroetinga	6	c	DNF	
12	Norway	Håvard Bøkko; Sverre Lunde Pedersen; Sindre Henriksen	3	f	DNS	

Note: NR = national record.
