= 2015–16 ISU Speed Skating World Cup – World Cup 1 – Men's 1500 metres =

The men's 1500 metres race of the 2015–16 ISU Speed Skating World Cup 1, arranged in the Olympic Oval, in Calgary, Alberta, Canada, was held on 15 November 2015.

Denis Yuskov of Russia won the race, while Bart Swings of Belgium came second, and Joey Mantia of the United States came third. Ted-Jan Bloemen of Canada won the Division B race.

== Results ==
The race took place on Sunday, 15 November, with Division B scheduled in the morning session, at 10:35, and Division A scheduled in the afternoon session, at 13:12.

=== Division A ===
Rank	Name	Nat.	Pair	Lane	Time	WC points	GWC points
1st place, gold medalist(s)	Denis Yuskov	(Russia)	4	o	1:41.88 NR	100	100
2nd place, silver medalist(s)	Bart Swings	(Belgium)	7	i	1:42.480 NR	80	80
3rd place, bronze medalist(s)	Joey Mantia	(United States)	5	i	1:42.482	70	70
4	Kjeld Nuis	(Netherlands)	9	i	1:42.89	60	60
5	Konrad Niedźwiedzki	(Poland)	5	o	1:43.90	50	50
6	Thomas Krol	(Netherlands)	7	o	1:43.93	45	—
7	Sverre Lunde Pedersen	(Norway)	10	o	1:44.10	40	
8	Shani Davis	(United States)	2	o	1:44.22	36	
9	Gerben Jorritsma	(Netherlands)	9	o	1:44.44	32	
10	Li Bailin	(China)	6	o	1:44.49 NR	28	
11	Jan Szymański	(Poland)	8	o	1:44.57	24	
12	Håvard Bøkko	(Norway)	1	i	1:45.09	21	
13	Joo Hyung-joon	(South Korea)	1	o	1:45.35	18	
14	Sergey Trofimov	(Russia)	2	i	1:45.43	16	
15	Haralds Silovs	(Latvia)	4	i	1:45.54	14	
16	Vincent De Haître	(Canada)	10	i	1:45.70	12	
17	Wouter olde Heuvel	(Netherlands)	6	i	1:46.71	10	
18	Zbigniew Bródka	(Poland)	8	i	1:46.75	8	
19	Sven Kramer	(Netherlands)	3	o	1:46.91	6	
20	Kim Min-seok	(South Korea)	3	i	DNF		

Note: NR = national record.

=== Division B ===
Rank	Name	Nat.	Pair	Lane	Time	WC points
1	Ted-Jan Bloemen	(Canada)	9	o	1:44.91	25
2	Kirill Golubev	(Russia)	12	o	1:45.24	19
3	Sindre Henriksen	(Norway)	12	i	1:45.31	15
4	Vitaly Mikhailov	(Belarus)	2	o	1:45.86 NR	11
5	Konrád Nagy	(Hungary)	9	i	1:46.09	8
6	Yang Fan	(China)	7	i	1:46.21 NRJ	6
7	Denis Kuzin	(Kazakhstan)	13	o	1:46.25	4
8	Patrick Beckert	(Germany)	4	o	1:46.38	2
9	Kim Cheol-min	(South Korea)	14	o	1:46.39	1
10	Andrea Giovannini	(Italy)	4	i	1:46.47	—
11	Kim Jin-su	(South Korea)	7	o	1:46.56	
12	Jeffrey Swider-Peltz	(United States)	2	i	1:46.59	
13	Shota Nakamura	(Japan)	3	i	1:46.63	
14	Sergey Gryaztsov	(Russia)	14	i	1:46.66	
15	Dmitry Babenko	(Kazakhstan)	1	i	1:46.69	
16	Sebastian Klosinski	(Poland)	10	i	1:46.79	
17	Olivier Jean	(Canada)	8	i	1:46.89	
18	David Andersson	(Sweden)	5	o	1:47.19	
19	Piotr Puszkarski	(Poland)	10	o	1:47.66	
20	Viktor Hald Thorup	(Denmark)	5	i	1:47.92 NR	
21	Martin Corbett	(Canada)	6	o	1:47.99	
22	Linus Heidegger	(Austria)	11	i	1:48.041	
23	Livio Wenger	(Switzerland)	1	o	1:48.047 NR	
24	Benjamin Donnelly	(Canada)	13	i	1:48.23	
25	Reyon Kay	(New Zealand)	6	i	1:48.32	
26	Kimani Griffin	(United States)	11	o	1:48.72	
27	Mathias Vosté	(Belgium)	8	o	1:49.67	
28	Iñigo Vidondo	(Spain)	3	o	1:50.61	

Note: NR = national record, NRJ = national record for juniors.
