= 2013–14 ISU Speed Skating World Cup – World Cup 1 – Men's team pursuit =

The men's team pursuit race of the 2013–14 ISU Speed Skating World Cup 1, arranged in the Olympic Oval, in Calgary, Alberta, Canada, was held on 9 November 2013.

The Dutch team won on a new world record, while the American team came second, and the South Korean team came third.

== Results ==
The race took place on Saturday, 9 November, in the morning session, scheduled at 13:17.

Rank	Country	Skaters	Pair	Lane	Time	WC points
1	Netherlands	Koen Verweij; Jan Blokhuijsen; Sven Kramer	7	i	3:37.17	100
2	United States	Brian Hansen; Jonathan Kuck; Trevor Marsicano	2	i	3:38.66	80
3	South Korea	Lee Seung-hoon; Joo Hyong-jun; Kim Cheol-min	7	o	3:40.53	70
4	Canada	Denny Morrison; Lucas Makowsky; Mathieu Giroux	5	o	3:41.39	60
5	Poland	Zbigniew Bródka; Konrad Niedźwiedzki; Jan Szymański	5	i	3:41.72	50
6	Norway	Håvard Bøkko; Sverre Lunde Pedersen; Håvard Holmefjord Lorentzen	6	o	3:41.88	45
7	Russia	Ivan Skobrev; Denis Yuskov; Sergey Gryaztsov	6	i	3:42.53	40
8	Italy	Matteo Anesi; Andrea Giovannini; Luca Stefani	4	o	3:43.37	35
9	France	Benjamin Macé; Alexis Contin; Ewen Fernandez	3	i	3:44.18	30
10	Germany	Patrick Beckert; Alexej Baumgärtner; Robert Lehmann	4	i	3:45.48	25
11	Japan	Shota Nakamura; Shane Williamson; Seitaro Ichinohe	2	o	3:47.46	21
12	Belgium	Bart Swings; Ferre Spruyt; Maarten Swings	3	o	3:48.43	18
13	Austria	Bram Smallenbroek; Armin Hager; Linus Heidegger	1	o	3:50.07	16
14	China	Sun Longjiang; Tian Guojun; Liu Yan	1	i	3:52.82	14
