= 2015–16 ISU Speed Skating World Cup – Men's team pursuit =

The men's team pursuit in the 2015–16 ISU Speed Skating World Cup was contested over four races, out of a total of six World Cup occasions for the season, with the first occasion taking place in Calgary, Alberta, Canada, on 14 November 2015, and the final occasion taking place in Heerenveen, Netherlands, on 11 March 2016.

The defending champion was South Korea. This year the Netherlands won three out of four races and the final classification.

== Top three ==
Position	Country	Points	Previous season

== Race medallists ==
WC #	Location	Date	Gold	Time	Silver	Time	Bronze	Time	Report
1	Calgary, Canada	14 November	Canada; Ted-Jan Bloemen; Jordan Belchos; Benjamin Donnelly	3:39.32	South Korea; Lee Seung-hoon; Kim Cheol-min; Joo Hyong-jun	3:39.60	Italy; Andrea Giovannini; Luca Stefani; Fabio Francolini	3:41.97	
3	Inzell, Germany	4 December	Netherlands; Jan Blokhuijsen; Douwe de Vries; Arjan Stroetinga; Jorrit Bergsma	3:41.27	Norway; Sverre Lunde Pedersen; Håvard Bøkko; Sindre Henriksen; Aleksander Waagenes	3:44.88	Poland; Jan Szymański; Konrad Niedźwiedzki; Zbigniew Bródka; Sebastian Klosinski	3:46.17	
4	Heerenveen, Netherlands	11 December	Netherlands; Sven Kramer; Jorrit Bergsma; Jan Blokhuijsen; Douwe de Vries	3:43.77	Norway; Sverre Lunde Pedersen; Håvard Bøkko; Sindre Henriksen; Aleksander Waagenes	3:44.66	Russia; Danil Sinitsyn; Aleksandr Rumyantsev; Sergey Gryaztsov; Sergey Trofimov	3:46.24	
6	Heerenveen, Netherlands	11 March	Netherlands; Jan Blokhuijsen; Arjan Stroetinga; Douwe de Vries	3:42.28	Norway; Sverre Lunde Pedersen; Håvard Bøkko; Simen Spieler Nilsen	3:43.42	Poland; Jan Szymański; Konrad Niedźwiedzki; Zbigniew Bródka	3:47.03	

Note: the races are over 8 laps.

== Standings ==
#	Country	CGY	INZ	HVN1	HVN2	Total
1	Netherlands	0	100	100	150	350
2	Norway	0	80	80	120	280
3	Poland	60	70	45	104	279
4	Italy	70	50	50	90	260
5	South Korea	80	60	60		200
6	Russia	45	35	70		150
7	Canada	100	0	35		135
8	Japan	50	30	40		120
9	Germany	40	45	25		110
10	United States	35	40	30		105
11	Switzerland	25	25	21		71
12	China	30	—	—		30
13	Austria	—	21	—		21
