= 2015–16 ISU Speed Skating World Cup – World Cup 3 – Men's team pursuit =

The men's team pursuit race of the 2015–16 ISU Speed Skating World Cup 3, arranged in Eisstadion Inzell, in Inzell, Germany, was held on 4 December 2015.

The Dutch team won the race, with the Norwegian team in second place, and the Polish team in third.

== Results ==
The race took place on Friday, 4 December, in the afternoon session, scheduled at 18:19.

Rank	Country	Skaters	Pair	Lane	Time	WC points
1st place, gold medalist(s)	Netherlands	Jan Blokhuijsen; Douwe de Vries; Arjan Stroetinga	1	c	3:41.27	100
2nd place, silver medalist(s)	Norway	Sverre Lunde Pedersen; Håvard Bøkko; Sindre Henriksen	2	c	3:44.88	80
3rd place, bronze medalist(s)	Poland	Jan Szymański; Konrad Niedźwiedzki; Zbigniew Bródka	5	c	3:46.17	70
4	South Korea	Joo Hyung-joon; Kim Cheol-min; Lee Seung-hoon	6	c	3:46.62	60
5	Italy	Luca Stefani; Andrea Giovannini; Fabio Francolini	5	f	3:46.93	50
6	Germany	Patrick Beckert; Moritz Geisreiter; Jonas Pflug	3	f	3:49.23	45
7	United States	Joey Mantia; Jeffrey Swider-Peltz; Ian Quinn	3	c	3:49.45	40
8	Russia	Sergey Gryaztsov; Aleksandr Rumyantsev; Sergey Trofimov	4	c	3:50.26	36
9	Japan	Shota Nakamura; Shane Williamson; Takuro Oda	4	f	3:52.76	32
10	Switzerland	Livio Wenger; Martin Hänggi; Christian Oberbichler	2	f	4:03.50	28
11	Austria	Mathias Hauer; Armin Hager; Linus Heidegger	1	f	4:03.52	24
12	Canada	Olivier Jean; Jordan Belchos; Stefan Waples	6	f	DNS	
