= 2014–15 ISU Speed Skating World Cup – World Cup 3 – Men's team pursuit =

The men's team pursuit race of the 2014–15 ISU Speed Skating World Cup 3, arranged in Sportforum Hohenschönhausen, in Berlin, Germany, was held on 5 December 2014.

The Polish team won the race, while the South Korean team came second, and the Dutch team came third.

== Results ==
The race took place on Friday, 5 December, in the afternoon session, scheduled at 18:21.

Rank	Country	Skaters	Pair	Lane	Time	WC points
1st place, gold medalist(s)	Poland	Zbigniew Bródka; Jan Szymański; Konrad Niedźwiedzki	5	o	3:45.88	100
2nd place, silver medalist(s)	South Korea	Lee Seung-hoon; Kim Cheol-min; Ko Byung-wook	6	o	3:46.97	80
3rd place, bronze medalist(s)	Netherlands	Douwe de Vries; Arjan Stroetinga; Frank Vreugdenhil	6	i	3:47.58	70
4	Russia	Aleksandr Rumyantsev; Danila Semerikov; Danil Sinitsyn	5	i	3:47.87	60
5	Italy	Nicola Tumolero; Andrea Giovannini; Luca Stefani	3	i	3:48.48	50
6	Canada	Tyler Derraugh; Ted-Jan Bloemen; Jordan Belchos	2	i	3:49.88	45
7	Austria	Armin Hager; Bram Smallenbroek; Linus Heidegger	4	o	3:49.94 NR	40
8	Norway	Sverre Lunde Pedersen; Fredrik van der Horst; Aleksander Waagenes	1	i	3:51.92	35
9	Japan	Takuro Oda; Shane Williamson; Takuro Ogawa	4	i	3:52.84	30
10	Germany	Alexej Bamgärtner; Marco Weber; Jonas Pflug	3	o	3:55.24	25
11	China	Sun Longjiang; Li Bailin; Rehanbai Talabuhan	2	o	3:56.79	21

Notes: NR = national record.
