= 2014–15 ISU Speed Skating World Cup – Men's team pursuit =

The men's team pursuit in the 2014–15 ISU Speed Skating World Cup was contested over three races on three occasions, out of a total of seven World Cup occasions for the season, with the first occasion taking place in Obihiro, Japan, on 14–16 November 2014, and the last occasion taking place in Heerenveen, Netherlands, on 12–14 December 2014.

The defending champions were the Netherlands.

The South Korean team won the cup after having collected silver medals in the first two competitions, and a gold medal in the final competition.

== Top three ==
| Position | Country | Points | Previous season |
|---|---|---|---|
| 1 | South Korea | 310 | 5th |
| 2 | Netherlands | 290 | 1st |
| 3 | Poland | 205 | 4th |

== Race medallists ==
| WC # | Location | Date | Gold | Time | Silver | Time | Bronze | Time | Report |
|---|---|---|---|---|---|---|---|---|---|
| 1 | Obihiro, Japan | 15 November | Netherlands; Sven Kramer; Wouter olde Heuvel; Douwe de Vries | 3:43.68 | South Korea; Lee Seung-hoon; Kim Cheol-min; Ko Byung-wook | 3:47.15 | Russia; Aleksandr Rumyantsev; Danila Semerikov; Danil Sinitsyn | 3:48.22 | |
| 3 | Berlin, Germany | 5 December | Poland; Zbigniew Bródka; Jan Szymański; Konrad Niedźwiedzki | 3:45.88 | South Korea; Lee Seung-hoon; Kim Cheol-min; Ko Byung-wook | 3:46.97 | Netherlands; Douwe de Vries; Arjan Stroetinga; Frank Vreugdenhil | 3:47.58 | |
| 4 | Heerenveen, Netherlands | 12 December | South Korea; Kim Cheol-min; Ko Byung-wook; Lee Seung-hoon | 3:44.57 | Netherlands; Arjan Stroetinga; Frank Vreugdenhil; Douwe de Vries | 3:44.97 | Norway; Håvard Bøkko; Fredrik van der Horst; Sverre Lunde Pedersen | 3:45.52 | |

== Standings ==
Standings as of 12 December 2014 (end of the season).

| # | Country | OBI | BER | HVN | Total |
|---|---|---|---|---|---|
| 1 | South Korea | 80 | 80 | 150 | 310 |
| 2 | Netherlands | 100 | 70 | 120 | 290 |
| 3 | Poland | 60 | 100 | 45 | 205 |
| 4 | Italy | 40 | 50 | 76 | 166 |
| 5 | Russia | 70 | 60 | 36 | 166 |
| 6 | Canada | 30 | 45 | 90 | 165 |
| 7 | Norway | | 35 | 106 | 141 |
| 8 | Japan | 50 | 30 | 32 | 112 |
| 9 | Germany | 35 | 25 | 40 | 100 |
| 10 | Austria | 45 | 40 | | 85 |
| 11 | China | 25 | 21 | 28 | 74 |
