= 2014–15 ISU Speed Skating World Cup – World Cup 4 – Men's team pursuit =

The men's team pursuit race of the 2014–15 ISU Speed Skating World Cup 4, arranged in the Thialf arena in Heerenveen, Netherlands, was held on 12 December 2014.

The South Korean team won the race, while the Dutch team came second, and the Norwegian team came third.

== Results ==
The race took place on Friday, 12 December, in the afternoon session, scheduled at 18:12.

Rank	Country	Skaters	Pair	Lane	Time	WC points
1st place, gold medalist(s)	South Korea	Kim Cheol-min; Ko Byung-wook; Lee Seung-hoon	4	i	3:44.57	150
2nd place, silver medalist(s)	Netherlands	Arjan Stroetinga; Frank Vreugdenhil; Douwe de Vries	5	i	3:44.97	120
3rd place, bronze medalist(s)	Norway	Håvard Bøkko; Fredrik van der Horst; Sverre Lunde Pedersen	1	o	3:45.52	106
4	Canada	Jordan Belchos; Ted-Jan Bloemen; Denny Morrison	2	i	3:45.57	90
5	Italy	Andrea Giovannini; Luca Stefani; Nicola Tumolero	3	i	3:46.85	76
6	Poland	Zbigniew Bródka; Konrad Niedźwiedzki; Jan Szymański	5	o	3:47.90	45
7	Germany	Alexej Bamgärtner; Patrick Beckert; Marco Weber	2	o	3:48.24	40
8	Russia	Aleksandr Rumyantsev; Danil Sinitsyn; Denis Yuskov	4	o	3:49.15	36
9	Japan	Shota Nakamura; Takuro Ogawa; Shane Williamson	3	o	3:50.98	32
10	China	Liu Yiming; Sun Longjiang; Rehanbai Talabuhan	1	i	3:54.84	28
