= 2013–14 ISU Speed Skating World Cup – Men's team pursuit =

The men's team pursuit in the 2013–14 ISU Speed Skating World Cup was contested over four races on four occasions, out of a total of six World Cup occasions for the season, with the first occasion taking place in Calgary, Alberta, Canada, on 8–10 November 2013, and the last occasion taking place in Heerenveen, Netherlands, on 14–16 March 2014. The races were over eight laps.

The defending champions were the Netherlands.

On 9 November, in the race in Calgary, the Dutch team, comprised by Koen Verweij, Jan Blokhuijsen and Sven Kramer, set a new world record with a time of 3:37.17. In the next race, in Salt Lake City on 16 November, the same Dutch team improved the world record again, this time to 3:35.60.

The Dutch team – with Blokhuijsen participating in all races – went undefeated through the season, and won the cup with the maximum points possible, 450, and a margin of 170 points to the next team. Behind Netherlands, it was a closer call, with three teams within 15 points. The United States team eventually took the silver, while Norway took the bronze, 5 points before Poland.

== Top three ==
Position	Country	Points	Previous season
1	Netherlands	450	1st
2	United States	280	11th
3	Norway	270	4th

== Race medallists ==
Occasion #	Location	Date	Gold	Time	Silver	Time	Bronze	Time	Report
1	Calgary, Alberta, Canada	9 November	Netherlands; Koen Verweij; Jan Blokhuijsen; Sven Kramer	3:37.17; WR	United States; Brian Hansen; Jonathan Kuck; Trevor Marsicano	3:38.66	South Korea; Lee Seung-hoon; Joo Hyong-jun; Kim Cheol-min	3:40.53	
2	Salt Lake City, United States	16 November	Netherlands; Jan Blokhuijsen; Koen Verweij; Sven Kramer	3:35.60; WR	United States; Brian Hansen; Jonathan Kuck; Shani Davis	3:37.22	South Korea; Lee Seung-hoon; Kim Cheol-min; Joo Hyong-jun	3:37.51	
4	Berlin, Germany	7 December	Netherlands; Douwe de Vries; Jan Blokhuijsen; Jorrit Bergsma	3:41.46	South Korea; Lee Seung-hoon; Kim Cheol-min; Joo Hyong-jun	3:41.92	Poland; Zbigniew Bródka; Konrad Niedźwiedzki; Jan Szymański	3:43.81	
6	Heerenveen, Netherlands	15 March	Netherlands; Jan Blokhuijsen; Christijn Groeneveld; Douwe de Vries	3:45.00	Poland; Zbigniew Bródka; Konrad Niedźwiedzki; Artur Waś	3:45.73	Norway; Håvard Bøkko; Håvard Holmefjord Lorentzen; Sverre Lunde Pedersen	3:50.08	

== Standings ==
Standings as of 15 March 2014 (end of the season).

#	Country	CAL	SLC	BER	HVN	Total
1	Netherlands	100	100	100	150	450
2	United States	80	80	30	90	280
3	Norway	45	60	60	105	270
4	Poland	50	25	70	120	265
5	South Korea	70	70	80		220
6	Canada	60	40	35		135
7	France	30	50	40		120
7	Germany	25	45	50		120
9	Russia	40	35	45		120
10	Italy	35	30	25		90
11	Japan	21		21		42
12	Belgium	18	21			39
13	Austria	16		18		34
13	New Zealand		18	16		34
15	China	14		14		28
16	Kazakhstan		16			16
