= 2015–16 ISU Speed Skating World Cup – World Cup 1 – Men's 1000 metres =

The men's 1000 metres race of the 2015–16 ISU Speed Skating World Cup 1, arranged in the Olympic Oval, in Calgary, Alberta, Canada, was held on 14 November 2015.

Gerben Jorritsma of the Netherlands won the race, while Pavel Kulizhnikov of Russia came second, and Kjeld Nuis of the Netherlands came third. Mika Poutala of Finland won the Division B race.

== Results ==
The race took place on Saturday, 14 November, with Division B scheduled in the morning session, at 10:21, and Division A scheduled in the afternoon session, at 13:00.

=== Division A ===
Rank	Name	Nat.	Pair	Lane	Time	WC points	GWC points
1st place, gold medalist(s)	Gerben Jorritsma	(Netherlands)	5	o	1:07.20	100	100
2nd place, silver medalist(s)	Pavel Kulizhnikov	(Russia)	10	i	1:07.33 NR	80	80
3rd place, bronze medalist(s)	Kjeld Nuis	(Netherlands)	9	i	1:07.40	70	70
4	Joey Mantia	(United States)	1	o	1:07.51	60	60
5	Shani Davis	(United States)	8	i	1:07.75	50	50
6	Aleksey Yesin	(Russia)	5	i	1:07.83	45	—
7	Kai Verbij	(Netherlands)	8	o	1:07.89	40	
8	Vincent De Haître	(Canada)	7	i	1:08.11	36	
9	Denis Kuzin	(Kazakhstan)	4	i	1:08.12	32	
10	Piotr Michalski	(Poland)	1	i	1:08.54	28	
11	Kirill Golubev	(Russia)	2	i	1:08.57	24	
12	Li Bailin	(China)	4	o	1:08.59 NR	21	
13	Thomas Krol	(Netherlands)	3	o	1:08.62	18	
14	Alexandre St-Jean	(Canada)	3	i	1:08.69	16	
15	Alex Boisvert-Lacroix	(Canada)	6	i	1:08.74	14	
16	Espen Aarnes Hvammen	(Norway)	6	o	1:08.78	12	
17	Nico Ihle	(Germany)	10	o	1:09.13	10	
18	Joel Dufter	(Germany)	7	o	1:09.28	8	
19	Stefan Groothuis	(Netherlands)	9	o	DQ		
19	Kim Tae-yun	(South Korea)	2	o	DQ		

Note: NR = national record.

=== Division B ===
Rank	Name	Nat.	Pair	Lane	Time	WC points
1	Mika Poutala	(Finland)	14	i	1:07.90	25
2	Mitchell Whitmore	(United States)	19	i	1:08.43	19
3	Roman Krech	(Kazakhstan)	13	i	1:08.59	15
4	Kim Jin-su	(South Korea)	15	o	1:08.76	11
5	Richard Maclennan	(Canada)	18	o	1:08.89	8
6	Jang Won-hoon	(South Korea)	16	i	1:08.92	6
7	William Dutton	(Canada)	2	i	1:09.04	4
8	Yang Fan	(China)	15	i	1:09.06	2
9	Sindre Henriksen	(Norway)	13	o	1:09.10	1
10	Hubert Hirschbichler	(Germany)	18	i	1:09.19	—
11	Bart Swings	(Belgium)	12	o	1:09.28 NR	
12	Sverre Lunde Pedersen	(Norway)	11	o	1:09.312	
13	Ruslan Murashov	(Russia)	11	i	1:09.316	
14	Konrad Niedźwiedzki	(Poland)	17	i	1:09.42	
15	David Andersson	(Sweden)	6	i	1:09.440 NR	
15	Jonathan Garcia	(United States)	7	o	1:09.440	
17	Xie Jiaxuan	(China)	4	i	1:09.50	
18	Tian Guojun	(China)	9	i	1:09.55	
19	Haralds Silovs	(Latvia)	17	o	1:09.60	
20	Konrád Nagy	(Hungary)	8	o	1:09.74 NR	
21	Tsukasa Owada	(Japan)	4	o	1:09.75	
22	Mirko Giacomo Nenzi	(Italy)	16	o	1:09.88	
23	David Bosa	(Italy)	5	o	1:10.11	
24	Daichi Yamanaka	(Japan)	1	i	1:10.13	
25	Vitaly Mikhailov	(Belarus)	10	o	1:10.15 NR	
26	Sebastian Klosinski	(Poland)	6	o	1:10.200	
27	Daniel Greig	(Australia)	14	o	1:10.205	
28	Aleksandr Zhigin	(Kazakhstan)	7	i	1:10.27	
29	Pedro Causil	(Colombia)	8	i	1:10.29 NR	
30	Sung Ching-Yang	(Chinese Taipei)	5	i	1:10.48	
31	Artur Nogal	(Poland)	19	o	1:10.50	
32	Kim Jun-ho	(South Korea)	3	o	1:11.04	
33	Mathias Vosté	(Belgium)	10	i	1:11.10	
34	Christian Oberbichler	(Switzerland)	2	o	1:11.14 NR	
35	Juho Vaittinen	(Finland)	1	o	1:11.46	
36	Armin Hager	(Austria)	9	o	1:12.47	
37	Jan Daldossi	(Italy)	3	i	DQ	
38	Pekka Koskela	(Finland)	12	i	DNS	

Note: NR = national record.
