= 2017 World Single Distances Speed Skating Championships – Men's team pursuit =

Men's team pursuit at the 2017 World Single Distances Speed Skating Championships
- Venue: Gangneung Oval
- Location: Gangneung, South Korea
- Dates: 10 February
- Competitors: 24 from 8 nations
- Teams: 8
- Winning time: 3:40.66

Medalists
gold medal	Jorrit Bergsma; Jan Blokhuijsen; Douwe de Vries	Netherlands
silver medal	Shane Dobbin; Reyon Kay; Peter Michael	New Zealand
bronze medal	Sindre Henriksen; Simen Spieler Nilsen; Sverre Lunde Pedersen	Norway

The Men's team pursuit competition at the 2017 World Single Distances Speed Skating Championships was held on 10 February 2017.

== Results ==
The race started at 19:41.

Rank	Pair	Lane	Country	Time	Diff
1st place, gold medalist(s)	3	o	Netherlands	3:40.66	
2nd place, silver medalist(s)	2	i	New Zealand	3:41.08	+0.42
3rd place, bronze medalist(s)	3	i	Norway	3:41.60	+0.94
4	1	i	Canada	3:41.68	+1.02
5	4	o	Japan	3:42.77	+2.11
6	4	i	Italy	3:43.72	+3.06
7	1	o	Poland	3:44.79	+4.13
—	2	o	South Korea	DNF	
