= 2015–16 ISU Speed Skating World Cup – Women's team sprint =

The women's team sprint in the 2015–16 ISU Speed Skating World Cup was contested over four races, out of a total of six World Cup occasions for the season, with the first occasion taking place in Calgary, Alberta, Canada, on 14 November 2015, and the final occasion taking place in Heerenveen, Netherlands, on 11 March 2016.

The team sprint was a new event for the season. China won two out of four races and the inaugural classification.

== Top three ==
Position	Country	Points

== Race medallists ==
WC #	Location	Date	Gold	Time	Silver	Time	Bronze	Time	Report
1	Calgary, Canada	14 November	Japan; Erina Kamiya; Maki Tsuji; Nao Kodaira	1:26.82; WR	China; Yu Jing; Zhang Hong; Li Qishi	1:27.08	Canada; Marsha Hudey; Noémie Fiset; Heather McLean	1:28.39	
2	Salt Lake City, United States	22 November	China; Yu Jing; Zhang Hong; Li Qishi	1.24.65; WR	Russia; Yekaterina Shikhova; Nadezhda Aseyeva; Olga Fatkulina	1.26.07	Japan; Erina Kamiya; Maki Tsuji; Nao Kodaira	1.26.62	
4	Heerenveen, Netherlands	11 December	Netherlands; Floor van den Brandt; Janine Smit; Margot Boer; Sanneke de Neeling	1:29.23	Russia; Yekaterina Shikhova; Nadezhda Aseyeva; Olga Fatkulina; Margarita Ryzhova	1:29.64	Canada; Marsha Hudey; Kaylin Irvine; Heather McLean; Norway; Martine Ripsrud; Hege Bøkko; Ida Njåtun	DNF	
6	Heerenveen, Netherlands	11 March	China; Yu Jing; Zhang Hong; Li Qishi	1:28.98	Japan; Erina Kamiya; Maki Tsuji; Nao Kodaira	1:29.98	Netherlands; Bo Van Der Werff; Margot Boer; Janine Smit	1:30.04	

Note: the races are over 3 laps.

== Standings ==
#	Country	CGY	SLC	HVN1	HVN2	Total
1	China	80	100	0	150	330
2	Netherlands	60	50	100	104	314
3	Japan	100	70	—	120	290
4	Russia	0	80	80		160
5	Canada	70	60	0		130
6	Belarus	50	40	—		90
7	South Korea	—	45	0		45
8	Norway	—	—	0		0
