= 2015–16 ISU Speed Skating World Cup – World Cup 1 – Women's 500 metres =

The women's 500 metres races of the 2015–16 ISU Speed Skating World Cup 1, arranged in the Olympic Oval, in Calgary, Alberta, Canada, were held on 13 and 15 November 2015.

Lee Sang-hwa of South Korea won the first race, while Zhang Hong of China came second, and Brittany Bowe of the United States came third. Marsha Hudey of Canada won the first Division B race.

In the second race, Zhang was the winner, with Lee in second place, and Heather Richardson-Bergsma of the United States in third. Yekaterina Aydova of Kazakhstan won the second Division B race.

== Race 1 ==
Race one took place on Friday, 13 November, with Division B scheduled in the morning session, at 10:04, and Division A scheduled in the afternoon session, at 13:34.

=== Division A ===
Rank	Name	Nat.	Pair	Lane	Time	WC points	GWC points
1st place, gold medalist(s)	Lee Sang-hwa	(South Korea)	9	o	36.96	100	50
2nd place, silver medalist(s)	Zhang Hong	(China)	3	i	37.18	80	40
3rd place, bronze medalist(s)	Brittany Bowe	(United States)	9	i	37.22	70	35
4	Heather Richardson-Bergsma	(United States)	8	o	37.29	60	30
5	Vanessa Bittner	(Austria)	5	i	37.49 NR	50	25
6	Yu Jing	(China)	1	i	37.58	45	—
7	Maki Tsuji	(Japan)	4	o	37.62	40	
8	Erina Kamiya	(Japan)	3	o	37.77	36	
9	Jorien ter Mors	(Netherlands)	8	i	37.82	32	
10	Olga Fatkulina	(Russia)	6	i	37.88	28	
11	Nao Kodaira	(Japan)	10	o	38.01	24	
12	Karolína Erbanová	(Czech Republic)	7	o	38.10	21	
13	Arisa Go	(Japan)	1	o	38.12	18	
14	Bo van der Werff	(Netherlands)	7	i	38.21	16	
15	Margot Boer	(Netherlands)	4	i	38.27	14	
16	Nadezhda Aseyeva	(Russia)	2	i	38.35	12	
17	Floor van den Brandt	(Netherlands)	6	o	38.38	10	
18	Yekaterina Aydova	(Kazakhstan)	5	o	38.41	8	
19	Janine Smit	(Netherlands)	2	o	38.58	6	
20	Gabriele Hirschbichler	(Germany)	10	i	38.59	5	

Note: NR = national record.

=== Division B ===
Rank	Name	Nat.	Pair	Lane	Time	WC points
1	Marsha Hudey	(Canada)	8	o	37.86	25
2	Heather McLean	(Canada)	8	i	37.90	19
3	Li Qishi	(China)	7	o	37.93	15
4	Sugar Todd	(United States)	6	o	38.15	11
5	Kim Min-sun	(South Korea)	7	i	38.40	8
6	Kim Hyun-yung	(South Korea)	6	i	38.41	6
7	Kaylin Irvine	(Canada)	3	i	38.600	4
7	Shannon Rempel	(Canada)	4	i	38.600	4
9	Yekaterina Shikhova	(Russia)	9	o	38.64	1
10	Yvonne Daldossi	(Italy)	10	o	38.70	—
11	Park Soo-jin	(South Korea)	5	o	38.73	
12	Jang Mi	(South Korea)	10	i	38.81	
13	Hege Bøkko	(Norway)	2	o	38.84	
14	Elina Risku	(Finland)	4	o	38.86	
15	Jessica Gregg	(Canada)	5	i	38.97	
16	Margarita Ryzhova	(Russia)	9	i	39.05	
17	Zhang Xin	(China)	3	o	39.07	
18	Ksenia Sadovskaya	(Belarus)	2	i	39.57	
19	Paige Schwartzburg	(United States)	1	i	39.99	

== Race 2 ==
Race two took place on Sunday, 15 November, with Division A scheduled at 14:02, and Division B scheduled at 16:57.

=== Division A ===
Rank	Name	Nat.	Pair	Lane	Time	WC points	GWC points
1st place, gold medalist(s)	Zhang Hong	(China)	10	o	36.94	100	50
2nd place, silver medalist(s)	Lee Sang-hwa	(South Korea)	10	i	36.99	80	40
3rd place, bronze medalist(s)	Heather Richardson-Bergsma	(United States)	9	o	37.06	70	35
4	Brittany Bowe	(United States)	9	i	37.12	60	30
5	Yu Jing	(China)	8	o	37.32	50	25
6	Jorien ter Mors	(Netherlands)	6	i	37.50	45	—
7	Erina Kamiya	(Japan)	7	o	37.57	40	
8	Vanessa Bittner	(Austria)	8	i	37.64	36	
9	Maki Tsuji	(Japan)	7	i	37.65	32	
10	Heather McLean	(Canada)	4	o	37.67	28	
11	Nao Kodaira	(Japan)	5	o	37.73	24	
12	Olga Fatkulina	(Russia)	6	o	37.83	21	
13	Karolína Erbanová	(Czech Republic)	4	i	38.01	18	
14	Nadezhda Aseyeva	(Russia)	1	i	38.03	16	
15	Sugar Todd	(United States)	1	o	38.04	14	
16	Arisa Go	(Japan)	3	i	38.09	12	
17	Marsha Hudey	(Canada)	5	i	38.20	10	
18	Margot Boer	(Netherlands)	2	o	38.37	8	
19	Li Qishi	(China)	2	i	38.42	6	
20	Bo van der Werff	(Netherlands)	3	o	38.48	5	

=== Division B ===
Rank	Name	Nat.	Pair	Lane	Time	WC points
1	Yekaterina Aydova	(Kazakhstan)	8	i	38.21	25
2	Floor van den Brandt	(Netherlands)	9	i	38.24	19
3	Janine Smit	(Netherlands)	7	i	38.26	15
4	Shannon Rempel	(Canada)	7	o	38.332	11
5	Kim Hyun-yung	(South Korea)	8	o	38.333	8
6	Kim Min-sun	(South Korea)	9	o	38.39	6
7	Jang Mi	(South Korea)	4	i	38.44	4
8	Hege Bøkko	(Norway)	4	o	38.45	2
9	Yekaterina Shikhova	(Russia)	6	o	38.55	1
10	Jessica Gregg	(Canada)	3	o	38.63	—
11	Zhang Xin	(China)	2	i	38.65	
12	Elina Risku	(Finland)	3	i	38.70 NR	
13	Park Soo-jin	(South Korea)	5	o	38.75	
14	Kaylin Irvine	(Canada)	6	i	38.82	
15	Yvonne Daldossi	(Italy)	5	i	38.86	
16	Elizaveta Kazelina	(Russia)	1	o	39.30	
17	Ksenia Sadovskaya	(Belarus)	2	o	39.58	
18	Paige Schwartzburg	(United States)	1	i	39.65	

Note: NR = national record.
