= 2017 World Single Distances Speed Skating Championships =

- Venue: Gangneung Oval, Gangneung, South Korea
- Dates: 9–12 February

The 2017 World Single Distances Speed Skating Championships was held between 9 and 12 February 2017 at the Gangneung Oval in Gangneung, South Korea.

== Schedule ==
All times are local (UTC+9).

Date	Time	Events
9 February	17:15	3000 m women
9 February	17:15	5000 m men
10 February	17:30	500 m women
10 February	17:30	500 m men
10 February	17:30	Team pursuit women
10 February	17:30	Team pursuit men
11 February	17:30	5000 m women
11 February	17:30	1000 m men
11 February	17:30	1000 m women
11 February	17:30	10,000 m men
12 February	18:00	1500 m women
12 February	18:00	1500 m men
12 February	18:00	Mass start women
12 February	18:00	Mass start men

== Medal summary ==
=== Medal table ===
* Host nation (South Korea)

Rank	Nation	Gold	Silver	Bronze	Total
1	Netherlands (NED)	8	3	4	15
2	United States (USA)	3	0	1	4
3	Japan (JPN)	1	3	1	5
4	Czech Republic (CZE)	1	1	0	2
4	South Korea (KOR)*	1	1	0	2
6	Germany (GER)	0	2	1	3
7	Canada (CAN)	0	1	2	3
7	Russia (RUS)	0	1	2	3
9	New Zealand (NZL)	0	1	1	2
10	France (FRA)	0	1	0	1
11	China (CHN)	0	0	1	1
11	Norway (NOR)	0	0	1	1
Totals (12 entries)		14	14	14	42

=== Men's events ===
Event	Gold		Silver		Bronze	
500 m	Jan Smeekens; Netherlands	34.58	Nico Ihle; Germany	34.66	Ruslan Murashov; Russia	34.76
1000 m	Kjeld Nuis; Netherlands	1:08.26	Vincent De Haître; Canada	1:08.54	Kai Verbij; Netherlands	1:08.78
1500 m	Kjeld Nuis; Netherlands	1:44.36	Denis Yuskov; Russia	1:44.67	Sven Kramer; Netherlands	1:45.50
5000 m	Sven Kramer; Netherlands	6:06.82	Jorrit Bergsma; Netherlands	6:09.33	Peter Michael; New Zealand	6:11.67
10,000 m	Sven Kramer; Netherlands	12:38.89	Jorrit Bergsma; Netherlands	12:43.95	Patrick Beckert; Germany	12:52.76
Team pursuit	Netherlands; Jorrit Bergsma; Jan Blokhuijsen; Douwe de Vries	3:40.66	New Zealand; Shane Dobbin; Reyon Kay; Peter Michael	3:41.08	Norway; Sindre Henriksen; Simen Spieler Nilsen; Sverre Lunde Pedersen	3:41.60
Mass start	Joey Mantia; United States	7:40.16	Alexis Contin; France	7:41.11	Olivier Jean; Canada	7:47.62

=== Women's events ===
Event	Gold		Silver		Bronze	
500 m	Nao Kodaira; Japan	37.13	Lee Sang-hwa; South Korea	37.48	Yu Jing; China	37.57
1000 m	Heather Bergsma; United States	1:13.94	Nao Kodaira; Japan	1:14.43	Jorien ter Mors; Netherlands	1:14.66
1500 m	Heather Bergsma; United States	1:54.08	Ireen Wüst; Netherlands	1:54.19	Miho Takagi; Japan	1:55.12
3000 m	Ireen Wüst; Netherlands	3:59.05	Martina Sáblíková; Czech Republic	3:59.65	Antoinette de Jong; Netherlands	4:01.99
5000 m	Martina Sáblíková; Czech Republic	6:52.38	Claudia Pechstein; Germany	6:53.93	Ivanie Blondin; Canada	6:57.14
Team pursuit	Netherlands; Antoinette de Jong; Marrit Leenstra; Ireen Wüst	2:55.85	Japan; Misaki Oshigiri; Miho Takagi; Nana Takagi	2:56.49	Russia; Olga Graf; Yekaterina Shikhova; Natalya Voronina	3:00.51
Mass start	Kim Bo-reum; South Korea	8:00.79	Nana Takagi; Japan	8:00.90	Heather Bergsma; United States	8:01.36
