= 2015–16 ISU Speed Skating World Cup – World Cup 1 – Women's mass start =

The women's mass start race of the 2015–16 ISU Speed Skating World Cup 1, arranged in the Olympic Oval, in Calgary, Alberta, Canada, was held on 15 November 2015.

Kim Bo-reum of South Korea won the race, while Irene Schouten of the Netherlands came second, and Ivanie Blondin of Canada came third. Misaki Oshigiri of Japan won the Division B race.

== Results ==
The race took place on Sunday, 15 November, in the afternoon session, with Division A scheduled at 15:07, and Division B scheduled at 18:27.

=== Division A ===
				Race points							
Rank	Name	Nat.	Laps	Split 1	Split 2	Split 3	Finish	Total	Time	WC points	GWC points
1st place, gold medalist(s)	Kim Bo-reum	(South Korea)	16				60	60	8:36.04	100	100
2nd place, silver medalist(s)	Irene Schouten	(Netherlands)	16			1	40	41	8:36.09	80	80
3rd place, bronze medalist(s)	Ivanie Blondin	(Canada)	16			3	20	23	8:36.16	70	70
4	Martina Sáblíková	(Czech Republic)	16		5			5	8:38.48	60	60
5	Heather Richardson-Bergsma	(United States)	16	5				5	8:39.11	50	50
6	Nikola Zdráhalová	(Czech Republic)	16			5		5	8:41.01	45	—
7	Park Do-yeong	(South Korea)	16		3			3	8:36.96	40	
8	Miho Takagi	(Japan)	16	3				3	8:47.31	36	
9	Janneke Ensing	(Netherlands)	16	1	1			2	8:37.63	32	
10	Nana Takagi	(Japan)	16						8:36.23	28	
11	Francesca Lollobrigida	(Italy)	16						8:36.73	24	
12	Hao Jiachen	(China)	16						8:38.25	21	
13	Marina Zueva	(Belarus)	16						8:38.59	18	
14	Claudia Pechstein	(Germany)	16						8:38.84	16	
15	Liu Jing	(China)	16						8:39.50	14	
16	Bente Kraus	(Germany)	16						8:39.68	12	
17	Josie Spence	(Canada)	16						8:40.47	10	
18	Jelena Peeters	(Belgium)	16						9:09.14	8	
19	Vanessa Bittner	(Austria)	16						9:14.20	6	
20	Natalya Voronina	(Russia)	15						DQ		

=== Division B ===
				Race points						
Rank	Name	Nat.	Laps	Split 1	Split 2	Split 3	Finish	Total	Time	WC points
1	Misaki Oshigiri	(Japan)	16				60	60	9:08.97	25
2	Noh Seon-yeong	(South Korea)	16				40	40	9:09.53	19
3	Francesca Bettrone	(Italy)	16				20	20	9:09.83	15
4	Luiza Złotkowska	(Poland)	16	5		5		10	9:11.55	11
5	Aleksandra Goss	(Poland)	16		5	1		6	9:18.99	8
6	Paige Schwartzburg	(United States)	16	1		3		4	9:11.49	6
7	Tatyana Mikhailova	(Belarus)	16	3				3	9:15.98	4
8	Natálie Kerschbaummayr	(Czech Republic)	16		1			1	9:29.25	2
9	Lisa van der Geest	(Netherlands)	16						9:09.99	1
10	Isabelle Weidemann	(Canada)	16						9:10.49	—
11	Erin Bartlett	(United States)	15		3				9:27.11	
