= 2015–16 ISU Speed Skating World Cup – World Cup 1 – Women's 3000 metres =

The women's 3000 metres race of the 2015–16 ISU Speed Skating World Cup 1, arranged in the Olympic Oval, in Calgary, Alberta, Canada, was held on 13 November 2015.

Martina Sáblíková of the Czech Republic won the race, while Irene Schouten of the Netherlands came second, and Natalya Voronina of Russia came third. Misaki Oshigiri of Japan won the Division B race.

== Results ==
The race took place on Friday, 13 November, with Division B scheduled in the morning session, at 09:00, and Division A scheduled in the afternoon session, at 12:30.

=== Division A ===
| Rank | Name | Nat. | Pair | Lane | Time | WC points | GWC points |
|---|---|---|---|---|---|---|---|
| 1st place, gold medalist(s) | Martina Sáblíková | (Czech Republic) | 7 | i | 3:57.21 | 100 | 100 |
| 2nd place, silver medalist(s) | Irene Schouten | (Netherlands) | 5 | i | 3:58.39 | 80 | 80 |
| 3rd place, bronze medalist(s) | Natalya Voronina | (Russia) | 4 | i | 3:58.78 NR | 70 | 70 |
| 4 | Jorien Voorhuis | (Netherlands) | 8 | i | 4:00.39 | 60 | 60 |
| 5 | Annouk van der Weijden | (Netherlands) | 5 | o | 4:00.45 | 50 | 50 |
| 6 | Marije Joling | (Netherlands) | 6 | i | 4:00.48 | 45 | — |
| 7 | Ivanie Blondin | (Canada) | 6 | o | 4:02.19 | 40 | |
| 8 | Claudia Pechstein | (Germany) | 8 | o | 4:02.30 | 35 | |
| 9 | Olga Graf | (Russia) | 3 | o | 4:02.62 | 30 | |
| 10 | Ida Njåtun | (Norway) | 3 | i | 4:03.31 | 25 | |
| 11 | Yvonne Nauta | (Netherlands) | 7 | o | 4:03.77 | 21 | |
| 12 | Anna Yurakova | (Russia) | 2 | i | 4:04.09 | 18 | |
| 13 | Stephanie Beckert | (Germany) | 4 | o | 4:04.91 | 16 | |
| 14 | Ayaka Kikuchi | (Japan) | 2 | o | 4:08.03 | 14 | |
| 15 | Kim Bo-reum | (South Korea) | 1 | o | 4:08.95 | 12 | |
| 16 | Nana Takagi | (Japan) | 1 | i | 4:17.79 | 10 | |

Note: NR = national record.

=== Division B ===
| Rank | Name | Nat. | Pair | Lane | Time | WC points |
|---|---|---|---|---|---|---|
| 1 | Misaki Oshigiri | (Japan) | 13 | o | 4:03.97 | 32 |
| 2 | Elizaveta Kazelina | (Russia) | 13 | i | 4:05.20 NRJ | 27 |
| 3 | Miho Takagi | (Japan) | 9 | o | 4:05.34 | 23 |
| 4 | Isabelle Weidemann | (Canada) | 8 | o | 4:06.57 | 19 |
| 5 | Fuyo Matsuoka | (Japan) | 10 | o | 4:07.53 | 15 |
| 6 | Bente Kraus | (Germany) | 12 | o | 4:08.79 | 11 |
| 7 | Marina Zueva | (Belarus) | 11 | o | 4:08.95 NR | 9 |
| 8 | Zhao Xin | (China) | 9 | i | 4:09.16 | 7 |
| 9 | Liu Jing | (China) | 4 | i | 4:09.87 | 6 |
| 10 | Park Do-yeong | (South Korea) | 7 | o | 4:10.00 | 5 |
| 11 | Jelena Peeters | (Belgium) | 12 | i | 4:10.19 | 4 |
| 12 | Josie Spence | (Canada) | 5 | i | 4:10.21 | 3 |
| 13 | Francesca Bettrone | (Italy) | 3 | i | 4:10.24 | 2 |
| 14 | Lauren McGuire | (Canada) | 4 | o | 4:13.35 | 1 |
| 15 | Aleksandra Goss | (Poland) | 2 | o | 4:13.40 | — |
| 16 | Luiza Złotkowska | (Poland) | 14 | i | 4:13.59 | |
| 17 | Nikola Zdráhalová | (Czech Republic) | 2 | i | 4:13.61 | |
| 18 | Urszula Włodarczyk | (Poland) | 14 | o | 4:13.87 | |
| 19 | Kali Christ | (Canada) | 6 | o | 4:14.60 | |
| 20 | Francesca Lollobrigida | (Italy) | 11 | i | 4:14.65 | |
| 21 | Katarzyna Woźniak | (Poland) | 7 | i | 4:14.88 | |
| 22 | Park Ji-woo | (South Korea) | 5 | o | 4:15.96 | |
| 23 | Tatyana Mikhailova | (Belarus) | 1 | i | 4:17.61 | |
| 24 | Saskia Alusalu | (Estonia) | 6 | i | 4:17.71 | |
| 25 | Erin Bartlett | (United States) | 3 | o | 4:22.60 | |
| 26 | Maria Lamb | (United States) | 10 | i | DNF | |
| 27 | Hao Jiachen | (China) | 8 | i | DQ | |

Note: NR = national record, NRJ = national record for juniors.
