= 2015–16 ISU Speed Skating World Cup – World Cup 1 – Women's team sprint =

The women's team sprint race of the 2015–16 ISU Speed Skating World Cup 1, arranged in the Olympic Oval, in Calgary, Alberta, Canada, was held on 14 November 2015.

The Japanese team won the race, while the Chinese team came second, and the Canadian team came third. As this was the first time the event was skated as an official ISU competition, the winning time automatically became the world record. The rest of the results became national records.

== Results ==
The race took place on Saturday, 14 November, in the afternoon session, scheduled at 16:17.

Rank	Country	Skaters	Pair	Lane	Time	WC points
1st place, gold medalist(s)	Japan	Erina Kamiya; Maki Tsuji; Nao Kodaira	3	c	1:26.82 WR	100
2nd place, silver medalist(s)	China	Yu Jing; Zhang Hong; Li Qishi	2	c	1:27.08 NR	80
3rd place, bronze medalist(s)	Canada	Marsha Hudey; Noémie Fiset; Heather McLean	2	f	1:28.39 NR	70
4	Netherlands	Bo van der Werff; Janine Smit; Margot Boer	3	f	1:28.64 NR	60
5	Belarus	Ksenia Sadovskaya; Tatyana Mikhailova; Marina Zueva	1	c	1:29.46 NR	50
6	Russia	Nadezhda Aseyeva; Olga Fatkulina; Margarita Ryzhova	1	f	DQ	

Note: WR = world record, NR = national record.
