= Erina Kamiya (speed skater) =

Japanese speed skater

Personal information
- Born: 1 May 1992 (age 34) Obihiro, Japan
- Height: 1.67 m (5 ft 6 in)

Sport
- Country: Japan
- Sport: Speed skating

Erina Kamiya (神谷 衣理那, Kamiya Erina; born 1 May 1992) is a Japanese speed skater who specializes in sprint distances.

== Career ==
Kamiya competed in the 2013 World Single Distance Speed Skating Championships in Sochi and finished 19th in the 1000m event. She was part of the Japanese team, with Maki Tsuji and Nao Kodaira, that won the team sprint at the 2015–16 ISU Speed Skating World Cup – World Cup 1 and set a new world record of 1:26.82. Kamiya finished fourth at the 500m event of the 2015–16 ISU Speed Skating World Cup – World Cup 3.

== Personal records ==
Personal records
Women's speed skating
Event	Result	Date	Location	Notes
500 m	37.57	16 November 2013	Utah Olympic Oval, Salt Lake City	
1000 m	1:15.82	14 November 2015	Olympic Oval, Calgary	
1500 m	2:02.35	14 March 2008	Olympic Oval, Calgary	
3000 m	4:46.74	14 January 2007	Machiyama Highland Skating Center, Ikaho	
