= Stefan Due Schmidt =

Danish skater

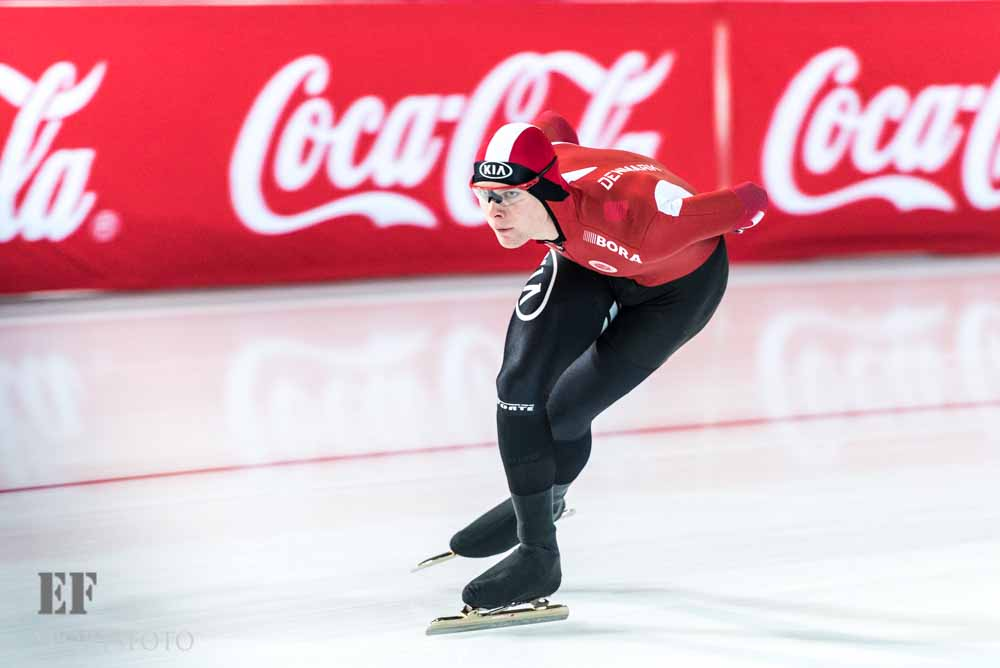
- Schmidt in 2017

Personal information
- Born: 28 August 1994 (age 31) Copenhagen, Denmark
- Height: 184 cm (6 ft 0 in)
- Weight: 77 kg (170 lb)

Sport
- Country: Denmark
- Sport: Speed skating

Stefan Due Schmidt (born 28 August 1994) is a speed skater from Copenhagen. He had been an inline speed skater before switching to ice. He competed for Denmark at the 2018 Winter Olympics.
