= Tian Guojun =

Chinese speed skater

Personal information
- Born: 10 March 1990 (age 36) Anda, China
- Height: 1.88 m (6 ft 2 in)
- Weight: 84 kg (185 lb)

Sport
- Country: China
- Sport: Speed skating

Achievements and titles
- Highest world ranking: 40 (1000m)

Tian Guojun (born 10 March 1990) is a Chinese speed-skater.

Tian competed at the 2014 Winter Olympics for China. In the 1000 metres he finished 34th overall, and in the 1500 metres he finished 21st.

Tian made his World Cup debut in November 2013. As of September 2014, Tian's top World Cup finish is 4th in a 1000m B race at Berlin in 2013–14. His best overall finish in the World Cup is 40th, in the 1000 metres in 2013–14.
