= Tyler Derraugh =

Personal information
- Born: July 19, 1986 (age 40) Winnipeg, Manitoba, Canada
- Website: http://tylerwd.com/Home.html

Sport
- Country: Canada
- Sport: Speed skating
Medal record
Men's speed skating
Representing Canada
Silver medal – second place	2015 Heerenveen	Team pursuit

Tyler Derraugh (born July 7, 1986) is a Canadian middle-distance and mass start speed skater who compete at the World Cup level.
