= Sindre Henriksen =

Norwegian speed skater

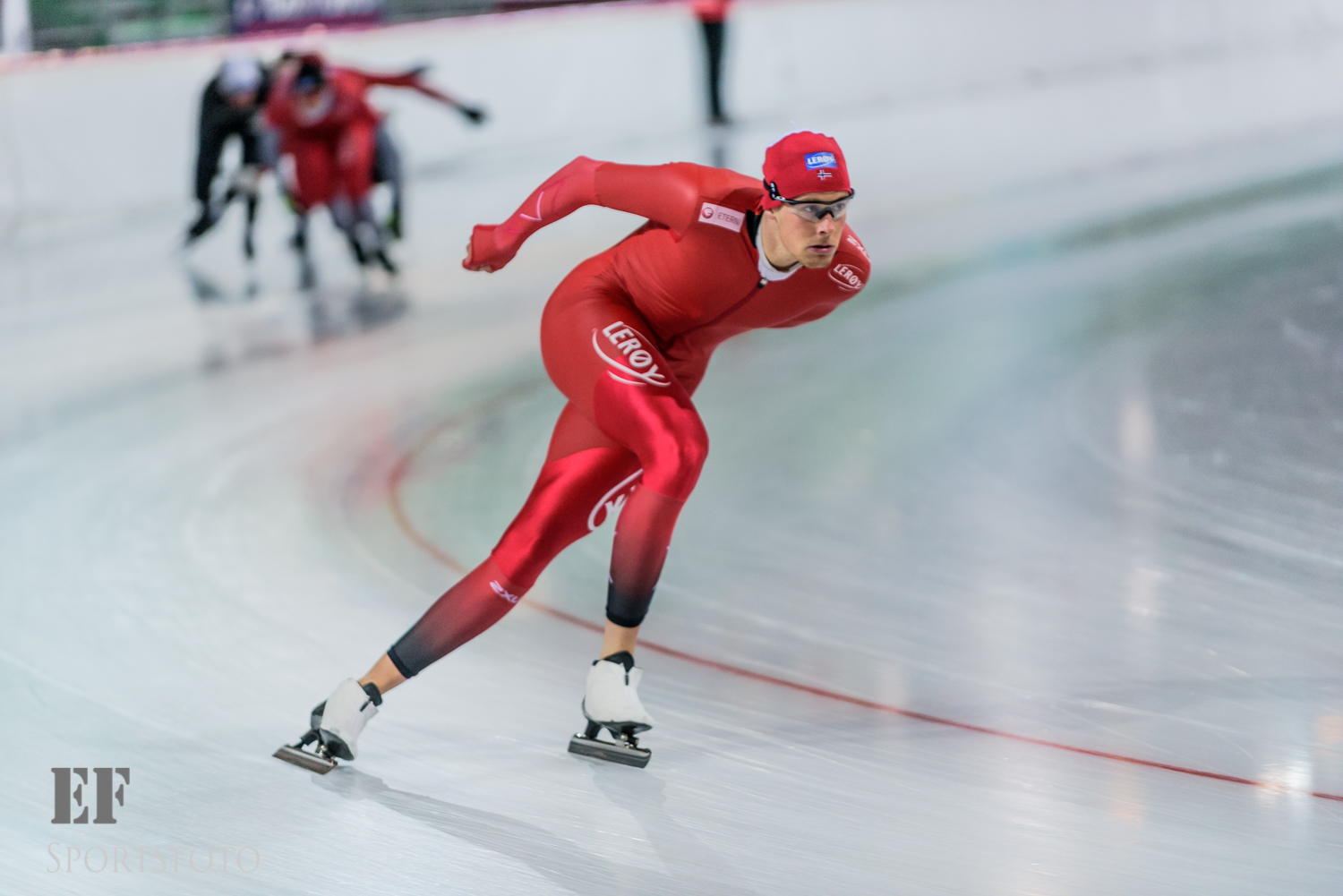
- Sindre Henriksen in 2017

Personal information
- Nationality: Norwegian
- Born: 24 July 1992 (age 33) Bergen, Norway
- Height: 1.90 m (6 ft 3 in)
- Weight: 82 kg (181 lb)

Sport
- Country: Norway
- Sport: Speed skating
- Club: Fana IL
Medal record
Olympic Games
| Gold medal – first place | 2018 Pyeongchang | Team pursuit |
World Single Distance Championships
| Silver medal – second place | 2019 Inzell | Team pursuit |
| Bronze medal – third place | 2017 Gangneung | Team pursuit |

Sindre Henriksen (born 24 July 1992) is a Norwegian speed skater.

At the 2017 World Single Distance Speed Skating Championships he won a bronze medal in team pursuit with the Norwegian team, along with Sverre Lunde Pedersen and Simen Spieler Nilsen.
