= Shota Nakamura =

Japanese speed skater (born 1993)

Personal information
- Born: 2 September 1993 (age 32)
- Height: 1.71 m (5 ft 7 in)
- Weight: 67 kg (148 lb)

Sport
- Country: Japan
- Sport: Speed skating

Shota Nakamura (中村 奨太, Nakamura Shōta; born 2 September 1993) is a Japanese speed skater. He competed in the 2018 Winter Olympics.
