= Peter Michael (speed skater) =

New Zealand speed skater (born 1989)

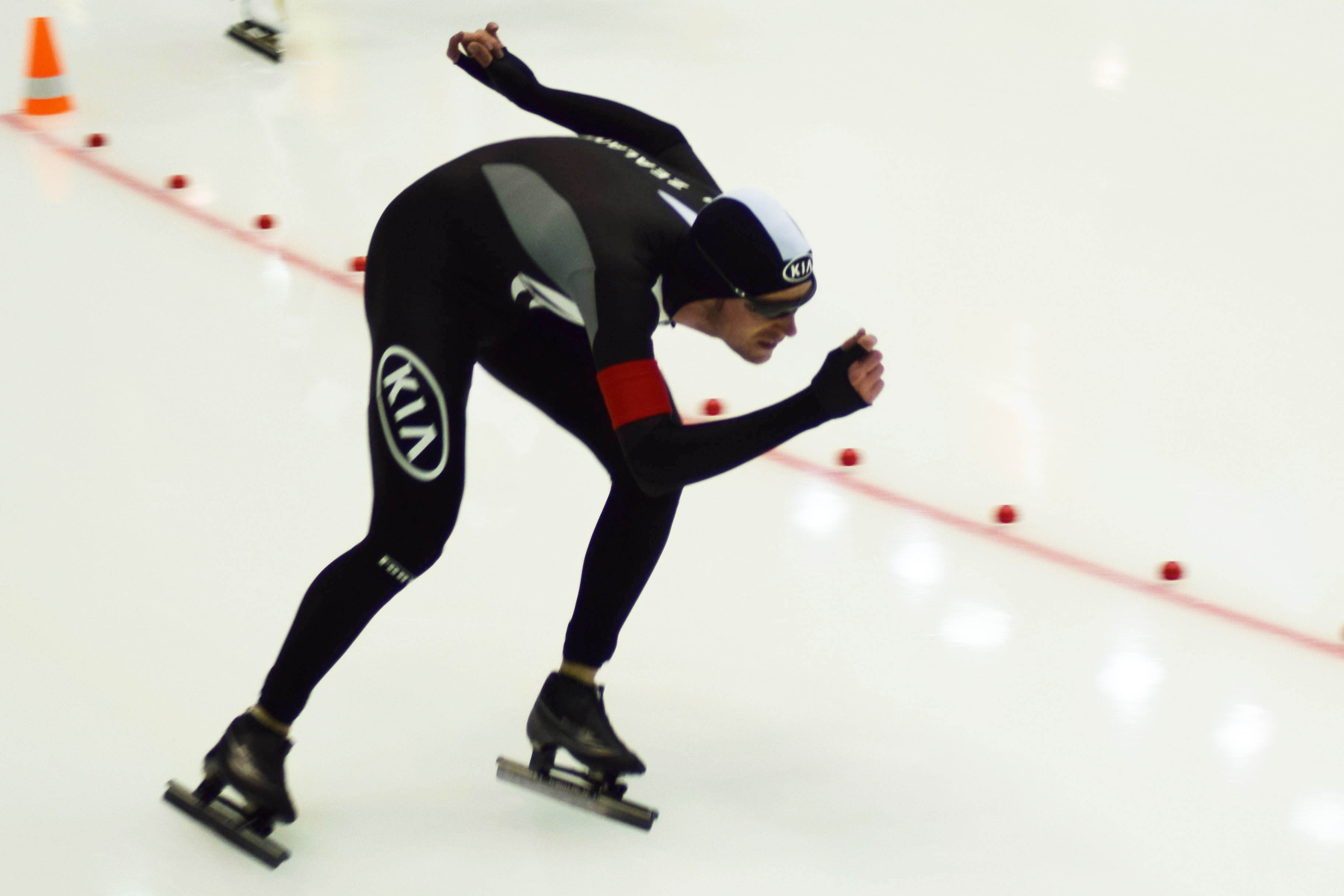
- Michael at the 2016 World Single Distance Championships

Personal information
- Born: 9 May 1989 (age 37) Wellington, New Zealand
- Height: 183 cm (6 ft 0 in)
- Weight: 72 kg (159 lb)

Sport
- Country: New Zealand
- Sport: Speed skating
Medal record
Representing New Zealand
Men's speed skating
World Single Distance Championships
| Silver medal – second place | 2017 Gangneung | Team pursuit |
| Bronze medal – third place | 2017 Gangneung | 5000 m |
Men's inline speed skating
The World Games
| Bronze medal – third place | 2017 Wroclaw | Track 15000 m E |
| Gold medal – first place | 2013 Cali | Track 15000 m E |
World Championships
| Gold medal – first place | 2016 Nanjing | Track 1000 m sprint |
| Gold medal – first place | 2016 Nanjing | Track 15000 m E |
| Gold medal – first place | 2014 Rosario | Track 15000 m E |
| Gold medal – first place | 2013 Ostend | Track 15000 m E |
| Gold medal – first place | 2012 Ascoli Piceno | Track 1000 m sprint |
| Gold medal – first place | 2012 Ascoli Piceno | Track 15000 m E |
| Gold medal – first place | 2011 Yeosu | Track 1000 m sprint |
| Gold medal – first place | 2011 Yeosu | Track 15000 m E |
| Silver medal – second place | 2016 Nanjing | Marathon |
| Silver medal – second place | 2013 Ostend | Marathon |
| Bronze medal – third place | 2012 Ascoli Piceno | Track 10000 m PE |
| Bronze medal – third place | 2011 Yeosu | Track 10000 m PE |
| Bronze medal – third place | 2009 Haining | Road 20000 m E |
| Bronze medal – third place | 2009 Haining | Road 5000 m relay |

Peter Michael (born 9 May 1989) is a New Zealand long track speed skater and multiple world champion inline speed skater. He is since 2022 a member of the Dutch Marathon team Team A6.nl.

Michael won a total of 12 (4 Junior, 8 Senior) titles at the world inline skating championships and two medals at The World Games; in 2013 (gold) and 2017 (bronze). He has also been competing in ice speed skating since 2016. In 2017, he won silver and bronze medals at the World Single Distance Championships in Gangneung, South Korea. Michael competed at the 2018 Winter Olympics, where his best finish was 4th in both the 5000 metres and the team pursuit.

Personal records
Men's speed skating
| Event | Result | Date | Location | Notes |
| 500 m | 37.44 | 28 February 2016 | Inzell, Germany | |
| 1000 m | 1:11.40 | 9 January 2022 | Inzell, Germany | |
| 1500 m | 1:44.96 | 9 December 2017 | Salt Lake City, USA | |
| 3000 m | 3:40.74 | 25 February 2017 | Inzell, Germany | |
| 5000 m | 6:09.68 | 10 December 2017 | Salt Lake City, USA | |
| 10000 m | 12:58.07 | 21 November 2015 | Salt Lake City, USA | |
