= Linus Heidegger =

Austrian speed skater (born 1995)

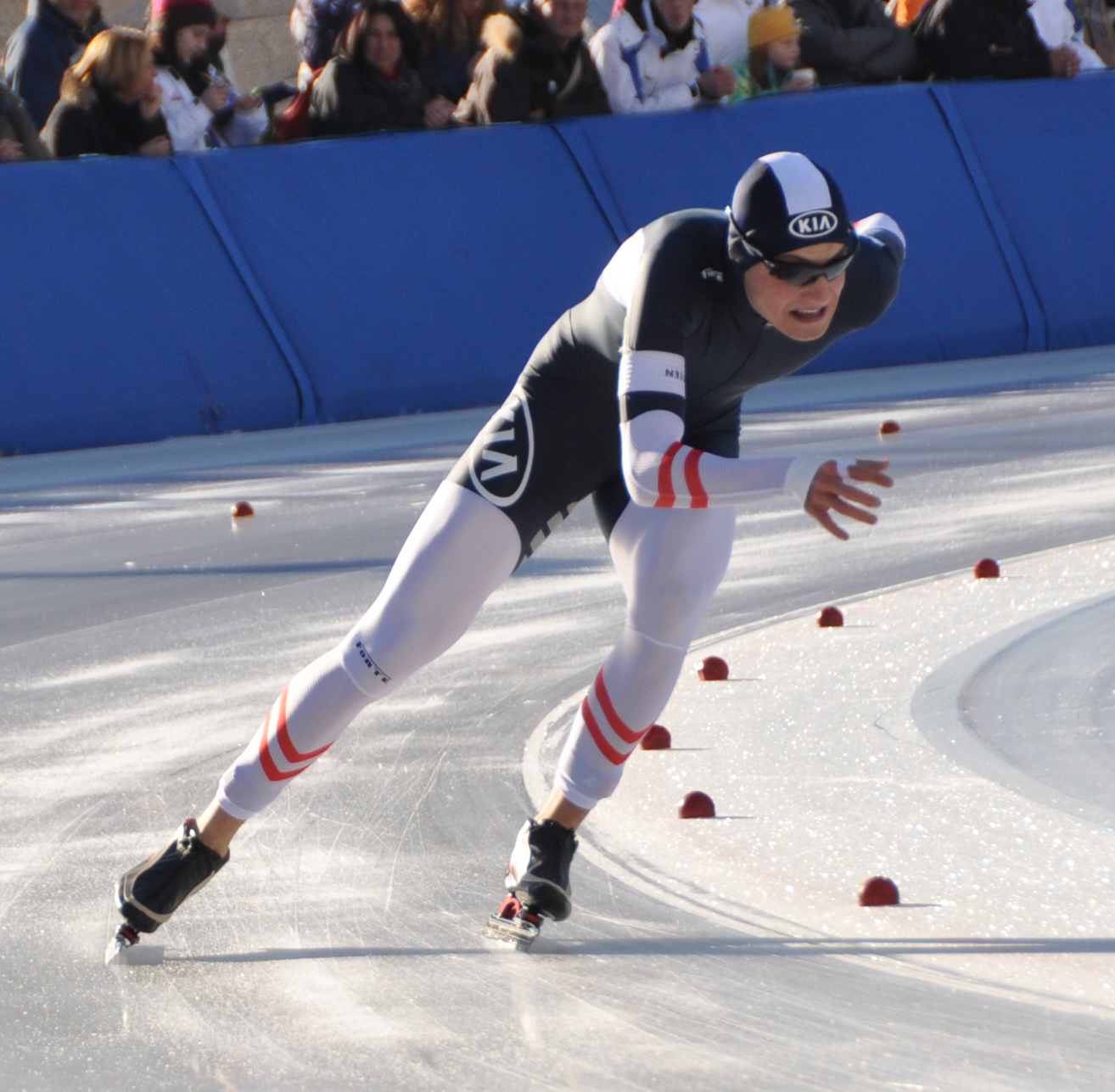
- Heidegger in 2015

Personal information
- Nationality: Austria
- Born: 23 August 1995 (age 30)

Sport
- Sport: Speed skating

Linus Heidegger (born 23 August 1995) is an Austrian speed skater who competes internationally.

He participated at the 2018 Winter Olympics.
