= Vitaly Mikhailov =

Belarusian long track speed skater (born 1986)

Vitaly Mikhailov (Belarusian: Віталь Сяргеевіч Міхайлаў; born 24 August 1986) is a Belarusian long track speed skater, born in Vitebsk, who participates in international competitions.

Mikhailov was the holder of the Belarusian record in 1000 meters, and is the current record-holder in 5000 and 10000 meters.

== Personal records ==
Personal records
Men's speed skating
Event	Result	Date	Location	Notes
500 m	36.36	2 November 2013	Olympic Oval, Calgary	
1000 m	1:09.97	21 November 2015	Utah Olympic Oval, Salt Lake City	
1500 m	1:45.86	15 November 2015	Olympic Oval, Calgary	
3000 m	3:44.71	26 August 2017	Olympic Oval, Calgary	
5000 m	6:16.92	8 February 2020	Olympic Oval, Calgary	Current Belarusian record.
10000 m	13:19.59	21 November 2015	Utah Olympic Oval, Salt Lake City	Current Belarusian record.

=== Career highlights ===
European Allround Championships
2006 - Hamar, 21st
2007 - Collalbo, 19th
2008 - Kolomna, 21st
World Junior Allround Championships
2004 - Roseville, Minnesota, 21st
2005 - Seinäjoki, 20th
2006 - Erfurt, 24th
National Championships
2003 - Minsk, (bronze) 3rd at allround
Nordic Junior Games
2004 - Berlin, (silver) 2nd at 3000 m
