= Reyon Kay =

New Zealand speed skater

Personal information
- Nationality: New Zealander
- Born: 10 December 1986 (age 39) Wellington, New Zealand
- Height: 175 cm (5 ft 9 in)
- Weight: 66 kg (146 lb)

Sport
- Country: New Zealand
- Sport: Speed skating

Reyon Kay (born 10 December 1986) is a New Zealand speed skater. He made his Olympic debut competing for New Zealand at the 2018 Winter Olympics.

He started with inline skating but transferred to speed skating in 2010 because he wanted to compete at the Winter Olympics.

He was the 2012 and 2016 Sportsperson of the Year in Kapiti, New Zealand.
