= Jan Szymański (speed skater) =

Polish speed skater (born 1989)

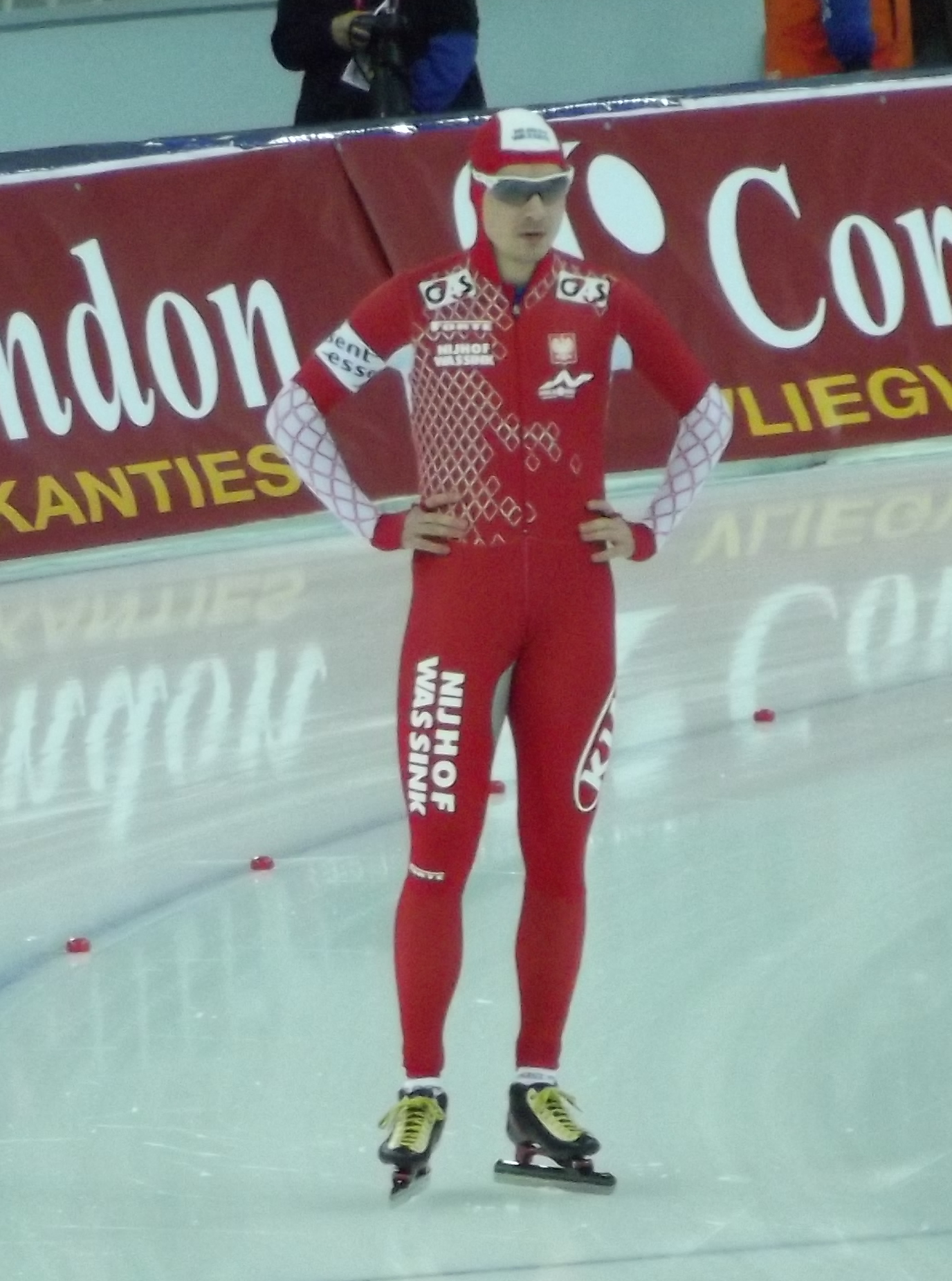

Personal information
- Born: 2 March 1989 (age 37) Poznań, Greater Poland Voivodeship, Poland
- Height: 1.80 m (5 ft 11 in)
- Weight: 77 kg (170 lb)
- Life partner: Luiza Złotkowska

Sport
- Country: Poland
- Sport: Speed skating
- Club: LKS Poroniec
- Coached by: Krzysztof Niedźwiedzki
Medal record
Men's speed skating
Representing Poland
Olympic Games
Bronze medal – third place	2014 Sochi	Team pursuit
European Championships
Bronze medal – third place	2018 Kolomna	Team pursuit
World Championships
Bronze medal – third place	2013 Sochi	Team pursuit
Universiade
Gold medal – first place	2013 Trentino	1500 m
Gold medal – first place	2013 Trentino	5000 m
Silver medal – second place	2013 Trentino	1000 m
Medal summary
Event	1st	2nd	3rd
European Championships	0	0	1
Olympic Games	0	0	1
World Championships	0	0	1
Universiade	2	1	0
Total	2	1	3
- Updated on 22 February 2014

Jan Marek Szymański (pronounced [ˈjan ˈmarɛk ʂɨˈmaj̃skʲi]; born 2 March 1989) is a Polish speed skater. He is the current holder of the Polish records in 3000 and 5000 metres.

== Speed skating ==
In speed skating at the 2013 Winter Universiade, Szymański, who is a student at the University School of Physical Education in Poznań, won the gold medal in both the 1500 and 5000 meters.

Jan won the bronze medal at the 2018 European Speed Skating Championships in Kolomna in the Team pursuit event together with his fellow team mates Zbigniew Bródka and Adrian Wielgat.

=== Olympic Games ===
At the 2013 World Single Distance Championships in Sochi, Russia, Szymański won the bronze medal in the men's team pursuit together with Zbigniew Bródka and Konrad Niedźwiedzki. The same result was reached at the 2014 Winter Olympics at the same venue.

=== Personal records ===
Personal records
Men's speed skating
Event	Result	Date	Location	Notes
500 m	35.97	7 March 2015	Olympic Oval, Calgary	
1000 m	1:09.11	25 November 2017	Olympic Oval, Calgary	
1500 m	1:44.46	20 November 2015	Utah Olympic Oval, Salt Lake City	
3000 m	3:39.79	7 November 2015	Olympic Oval, Calgary	Current Polish record.
5000 m	6:16.84	1 December 2017	Olympic Oval, Calgary	Current Polish record.
10000 m	13:27.49	2 December 2012	Alau Ice Palace, Astana	

== Personal life ==
Szymański's fiancée Luiza Złotkowska is also a speed skater.
