= Sun Longjiang =

Chinese speed skater (born 1992)

Sun Longjiang (simplified Chinese: 孙龙将; traditional Chinese: 孫龍將; pinyin: Sūn Lóngjiāng; born August 23, 1992, in Jilin) is a Chinese male speed skater.

He competed for China at the 2010 Winter Olympics in the 1000m and 1500m events.
