= Arjan Stroetinga =

Dutch speed skater

Personal information
- Nationality: Dutch
- Born: 26 May 1981 (age 45) Oosterwolde, Netherlands

Sport
- Country: Netherlands
- Sport: Speed skating
- Event(s): Marathon; Mass start
Medal record
World Championships
Gold medal – first place	2015 Heerenveen	Mass start
Gold medal – first place	2016 Kolomna	Team pursuit
Silver medal – second place	2016 Kolomna	Mass start
Silver medal – second place	2021 Heerenveen	Mass start
European Championships
Silver medal – second place	2020 Heerenveen	Mass start

Arjan Stroetinga (born 26 June 1981) is a Dutch former professional speed skater.

He won the silver medal in the mass start event at the 2021 World Single Distances Speed Skating Championships, after gold in 2015. He became seven times Dutch national marathon champion. He retired at the end of the 2020-21 speed skating season.
