= Shane Williamson =

Australian–Japanese speed skater (born 1995)

Personal information
- Nationality: Japanese
- Born: 28 April 1995 (age 31) Urakawa, Japan
- Height: 1.75 m (5 ft 9 in)
- Weight: 67 kg (148 lb)

Sport
- Country: Japan
- Sport: Speed skating
- Event: Team pursuit
- Club: Nidec Sankyo

Achievements and titles
- Highest world ranking: No. 46 (5000 & 10000 m)
Medal record
World Single Distances Championships
Silver medal – second place	2020 Salt Lake City	Team pursuit

Shane Williamson (ウイリアムソン師円, Wiriamuson Shēn; born 28 April 1995) is an Australian–Japanese speed skater who competed at the 2014 Winter Olympics for Japan.

He competed in the 5000 metres, where he finished 26th out of 26.

Williamson made his World Cup debut in November 2013. As of September 2014, Williamson's best World Cup finish is 11th, in a 5000 m B race in 2013–14. His best overall finish in the World Cup is 46th, in the 2013–14 5000 and 10000 m.

He is a member of the Nidec Sankyo speed skating team.
