= Kim Cheol-min =

South Korean speed skater (born 1992)

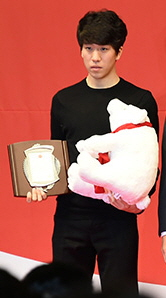

Personal information
- Born: 29 November 1992 (age 33) Seoul, South Korea
- Height: 172 cm (5 ft 8 in)
- Weight: 62 kg (137 lb)

Sport
- Country: South Korea
- Sport: Speed skating
Medal record
Men's speed skating
Representing South Korea
Olympic Games
| Silver medal – second place | 2014 Sochi | Team pursuit |
World Championships
| Silver medal – second place | 2013 Sochi | Team pursuit |
| Bronze medal – third place | 2015 Heerenveen | Team pursuit |
Winter Universiade
| Gold medal – first place | 2013 Trentino | Team pursuit |
World Junior Championships
| Silver medal – second place | 2012 Obihiro | Team pursuit |
| Bronze medal – third place | 2012 Obihiro | 5000 m |
Men's short track speed skating
World Championships
| Gold medal – first place | 2011 Warsaw | Team |

- Kim Cheol-min
- Hangul: 김철민
- Hanja: 金 哲民
- RR: Gim Cheolmin
- MR: Kim Ch'ŏlmin

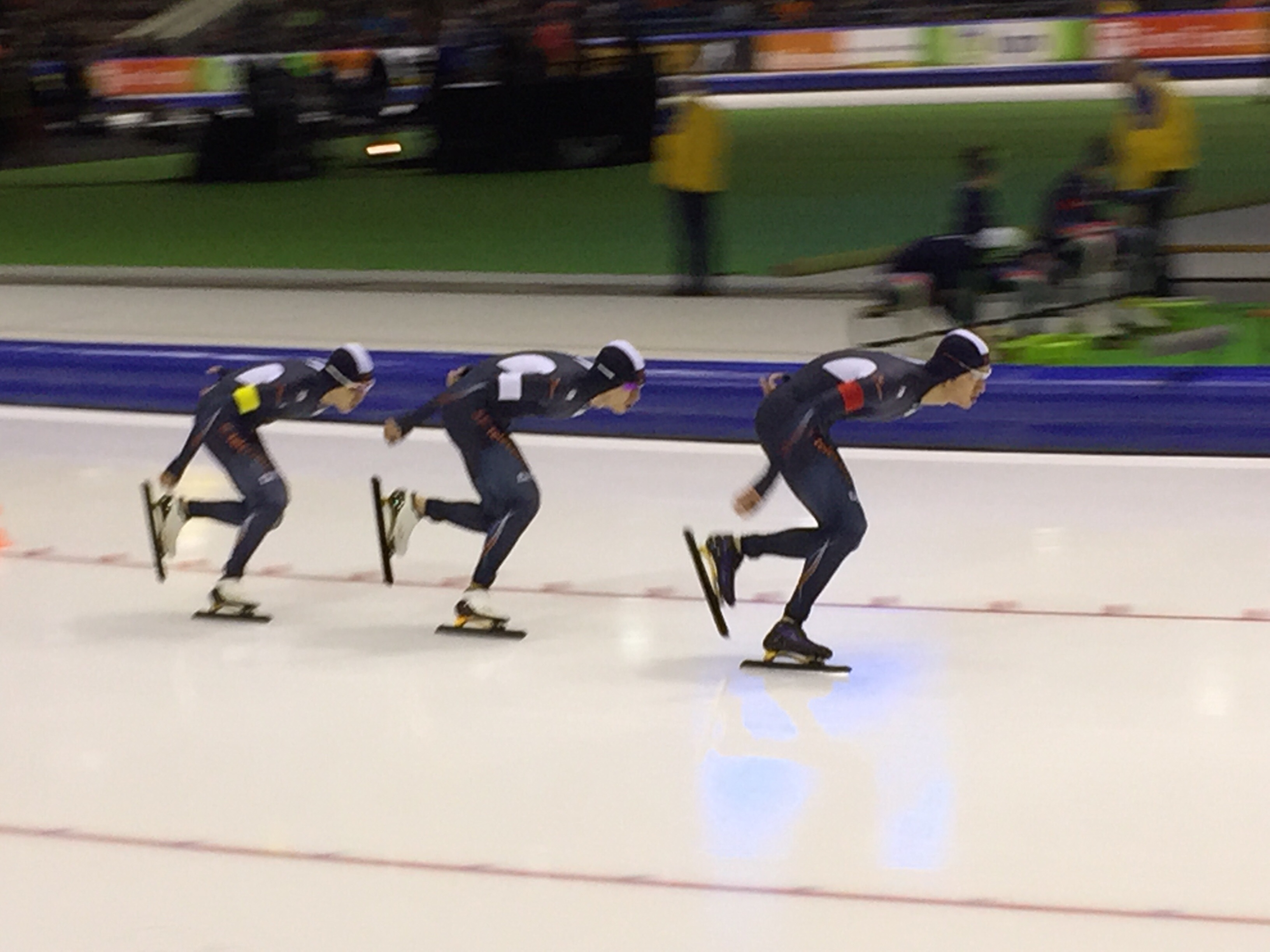
2015 World Single Distance Speed Skating Championships

Kim Cheol-min (Korean: 김철민, Korean pronunciation: [kim.tɕʰʌl.min]; born 29 November 1992) is a South Korean speed skater.

== Career ==
=== Short track career ===
Kim started short track speed skating as a child. In 2010, Kim was selected for the South Korean national short track speed skating team to compete in the 2010-11 ISU Short Track Speed Skating World Cup series, where he won gold in the 1500 metres at the fourth race in Shanghai and had two podium finishes as part of the relay team. In March 2011, Kim won the gold medal at the World Team Championships held in Warsaw, alongside overall world champions Noh Jin-kyu and Lee Ho-suk.

=== Long track career ===
In early 2011, Kim turned to long track speed skating. After winning two medals at the 2012 World Junior Speed Skating Championships in Obihiro, Kim was selected as a member of the South Korean national speed skating team for the 2012-13 season. He captured silver in the team pursuit race at the 2013 World Single Distance Championships, alongside 2010 Olympic champion Lee Seung-hoon and Joo Hyong-jun.

==== 2014 Winter Olympics ====
At the 2014 Winter Olympics in Sochi, Russia, Kim first competed on February 8, 2014 in the 5000 metres. In the 5000 m, Kim finished 24th among 26 skaters in 6:37.28.

The South Korean pursuit team for the 2014 Olympics consisted of Kim, Lee Seung-hoon and Joo Hyong-jun. South Korea eliminated Russia in the quarterfinal, which advanced them to face reigning Olympic Champion Canada in the semifinal. South Korea then beat the Canadian team by 2.96 seconds, with a final time of 3:42.32. The South Korean team eventually won the silver medal, defeated by the Netherlands in the gold medal final by 3.14 seconds, with a final time of 3:40.85.

== Personal life ==
He is the brother of short track speed skater Kim Dam-min.

== Records ==
=== Personal records (long track) ===
Personal records
Men's speed skating
| Event | Result | Date | Location | Notes |
| 500 m | 37.25 | 21 January 2013 | (South Korea); Seoul | |
| 1000 m | 1:24.75 | 22 February 2007 | (South Korea); Seoul | |
| 1500 m | 1:45.27 | 20 September 2013 | (Canada); Calgary | |
| 3000 m | 3:44.55 | 29 September 2012 | (Canada); Calgary | |
| 5000 m | 6:23.62 | 22 September 2013 | (Canada); Calgary | |
| 10000 m | 13:52.49 | 18 December 2013 | (Italy); Baselga di Pinè | |
