= 2015–16 ISU Speed Skating World Cup – World Cup 5 – Women's sprint combination =

The women's sprint combination of the 2015–16 ISU Speed Skating World Cup 5, arranged in the Sørmarka Arena in Stavanger, Norway, was contested on 29–31 January 2016. It was the only sprint combination competition of the 2015–16 World Cup.

The contest included each skater's best time from the 500 metres and 1000 metres competitions that were raced during the weekend. Jorien ter Mors of the Netherlands had the best combined result, while Brittany Bowe of the United States came second and Vanessa Bittner of Austria came third.

== Results ==
Rank	Name	Nat.	500 m (1)	1000 m (1)	500 m (2)	1000 m (2)	Points	GWC points
1st place, gold medalist(s)	Jorien ter Mors	(Netherlands)	37.99	1:14.52			75.250	100
2nd place, silver medalist(s)	Brittany Bowe	(United States)	38.10	1:14.61		1:14.35	75.275	80
3rd place, bronze medalist(s)	Vanessa Bittner	(Austria)	38.00	1:16.00	38.32	1:15.52	75.760	70
4	Yu Jing	(China)	37.93	1:17.74	37.63	1:16.37	75.815	60
5	Olga Fatkulina	(Russia)	38.18	1:15.74	38.09	1:15.68	75.930	50
6	Zhang Hong	(China)	37.82	1:16.40	37.82		76.020	—
7	Karolína Erbanová	(Czech Republic)	38.45	1:15.93	38.19	1:16.65	76.155	
8	Margot Boer	(Netherlands)	38.30	1:16.41	38.79	1:16.06	76.330	
9	Heather Richardson-Bergsma	(United States)	38.49	1:16.48	38.73	1:15.74	76.360	
10	Nao Kodaira	(Japan)	38.26	1:17.59	38.25	1:16.29	76.395	
11	Miho Takagi	(Japan)	38.46	1:16.39		1:16.00	76.460	
12	Li Qishi	(China)	38.76	1:16.39	38.97	1:16.17	76.845	
13	Yekaterina Shikhova	(Russia)	39.19		38.83	1:16.15	76.905	
14	Anice Das	(Netherlands)	38.65	1:16.65	38.90	1:17.21	76.975	
15	Hege Bøkko	(Norway)	39.20	1:16.98	39.11	1:16.02	77.120	
16	Heather McLean	(Canada)	38.06		38.02	1:18.40	77.220	
17	Janine Smit	(Netherlands)	38.71	1:17.84	38.90	1:17.09	77.255	
18	Nadezhda Aseyeva	(Russia)	38.93	1:17.70	38.65	1:18.30	77.500	
19	Gabriele Hirschbichler	(Germany)	39.09	1:17.39		1:17.11	77.645	
20	Kaylin Irvine	(Canada)	39.13	1:18.36	39.14	1:17.12	77.690	
21	Yekaterina Aydova	(Kazakhstan)	38.76	1:18.31	38.88	DQ	77.915	
22	Sugar Todd	(United States)	39.01	1:18.53	39.00	1:18.02	78.010	
23	Erina Kamiya	(Japan)	38.69	1:19.02	38.51		78.020	
24	Kim Hyun-yung	(South Korea)	39.06	1:18.68	39.22	1:18.31	78.215	
25	Park Seung-hi	(South Korea)	39.29	1:18.18	39.70	1:18.22	78.380	
26	Maki Tsuji	(Japan)	38.81	1:19.23	38.77	1:19.40	78.385	
27	Zhan Xue	(China)	39.52	1:18.29	39.51	1:17.93	78.475	
28	Anastasia Bucsis	(Canada)	39.34	1:19.36	39.32	1:18.47	78.555	
29	Kim Min-sun	(South Korea)	38.91	1:20.24	39.03	1:19.56	78.690	
30	Yvonne Daldossi	(Italy)	39.46	1:19.47	39.15	1:19.51	78.885	
31	Martine Ripsrud	(Norway)	39.64	1:19.37	39.41	1:19.04	78.930	
32	Shannon Rempel	(Canada)	38.99		39.04	1:20.06	79.020	
33	Ellen Bjertnes	(Norway)	39.97	1:18.82	40.64	1:19.59	79.380	
34	Shi Xiaoxuan	(China)	39.61	1:21.44	39.85	1:20.03	79.625	
35	Ksenia Sadovskaya	(Belarus)	39.88	1:19.75	40.02	1:20.17	79.755	
36	Paige Schwartzburg	(United States)	40.10	1:19.36	40.27	1:20.13	79.780	
37	Elina Risku	(Finland)	39.74	1:22.05	39.60	1:20.45	79.825	
38	Tatyana Mikhailova	(Belarus)	40.61	1:19.38	40.43	1:18.90	79.880	
39	Nam Ye-won	(South Korea)	39.59	1:20.86	39.84	1:21.58	80.020	
