= 2015–16 ISU Speed Skating World Cup – World Cup 5 – Women's 500 metres =

The women's 500 metres races of the 2015–16 ISU Speed Skating World Cup 5, arranged in the Sørmarka Arena in Stavanger, Norway, were held on 29 and 30 January 2016.

Zhang Hong of China won race one, while compatriot Yu Jing came second, and Jorien ter Mors of the Netherlands came third. Miho Takagi of Japan won the first Division B race.

Yu and Zhang shifted places at the top in race two, while Heather McLean of Canada finished in third place. Li Qishi of China won the second Division B race.

== Race 1 ==
Race one took place on Friday, 29 January, with Division B scheduled in the morning session, at 10:30, and Division A scheduled in the afternoon session, at 16:00.

=== Division A ===
Rank	Name	Nat.	Pair	Lane	Time	WC points	GWC points
1st place, gold medalist(s)	Zhang Hong	(China)	10	o	37.82	100	50
2nd place, silver medalist(s)	Yu Jing	(China)	8	i	37.93	80	40
3rd place, bronze medalist(s)	Jorien ter Mors	(Netherlands)	4	o	37.99	70	35
4	Vanessa Bittner	(Austria)	9	o	38.00	60	30
5	Heather McLean	(Canada)	8	o	38.06	50	25
6	Brittany Bowe	(United States)	9	i	38.10	45	—
7	Olga Fatkulina	(Russia)	7	i	38.18	40	
8	Nao Kodaira	(Japan)	6	o	38.26	36	
9	Margot Boer	(Netherlands)	3	o	38.30	32	
10	Karolína Erbanová	(Czech Republic)	5	i	38.45	28	
11	Heather Richardson-Bergsma	(United States)	10	i	38.49	24	
12	Marsha Hudey	(Canada)	4	i	38.58	21	
13	Erina Kamiya	(Japan)	7	o	38.69	18	
14	Janine Smit	(Netherlands)	1	o	38.71	16	
15	Yekaterina Aydova	(Kazakhstan)	2	o	38.76	14	
16	Maki Tsuji	(Japan)	6	i	38.81	12	
17	Kim Min-sun	(South Korea)	3	i	38.91	10	
18	Nadezhda Aseyeva	(Russia)	1	i	38.93	8	
19	Sugar Todd	(United States)	5	o	39.01	6	
20	Floor van den Brandt	(Netherlands)	2	i	39.05	5	

=== Division B ===
Rank	Name	Nat.	Pair	Lane	Time	WC points
1	Miho Takagi	(Japan)	6	o	38.46	25
2	Misaki Oshigiri	(Japan)	5	o	38.59	19
3	Anice Das	(Netherlands)	4	i	38.65	15
4	Li Qishi	(China)	12	i	38.76	11
5	Shannon Rempel	(Canada)	10	i	38.99	8
6	Kim Hyun-yung	(South Korea)	13	o	39.06	6
7	Gabriele Hirschbichler	(Germany)	9	i	39.09	4
8	Kaylin Irvine	(Canada)	12	o	39.13	2
9	Yekaterina Shikhova	(Russia)	13	i	39.19	1
10	Hege Bøkko	(Norway)	11	o	39.20	—
11	Park Seung-hi	(South Korea)	5	i	39.29	
12	Anastasia Bucsis	(Canada)	6	i	39.34	
13	Yvonne Daldossi	(Italy)	11	i	39.46	
14	Zhan Xue	(China)	3	i	39.52	
15	Nam Ye-won	(South Korea)	3	o	39.59	
16	Shi Xiaoxuan	(China)	4	o	39.61	
17	Martine Ripsrud	(Norway)	8	o	39.64	
18	Elina Risku	(Finland)	10	o	39.74	
19	Kaja Ziomek	(Poland)	1	o	39.78	
20	Ksenia Sadovskaya	(Belarus)	8	i	39.88	
21	Hanne Haugland	(Norway)	2	i	39.92	
22	Ellen Bjertnes	(Norway)	2	o	39.97	
23	Paige Schwartzburg	(United States)	9	o	40.10	
24	Tatyana Mikhailova	(Belarus)	7	i	40.61	
25	Karine Udahl	(Norway)	1	i	40.85	
26	Francesca Lollobrigida	(Italy)	7	o	40.88	

== Race 2 ==
Race two took place on Saturday, 30 January, with Division B scheduled in the morning session, at 08:45, and Division A scheduled in the afternoon session, at 14:30.

=== Division A ===
Rank	Name	Nat.	Pair	Lane	Time	WC points	GWC points
1st place, gold medalist(s)	Yu Jing	(China)	9	i	37.63	100	50
2nd place, silver medalist(s)	Zhang Hong	(China)	10	i	37.82	80	40
3rd place, bronze medalist(s)	Heather McLean	(Canada)	8	i	38.02	70	35
4	Olga Fatkulina	(Russia)	8	o	38.09	60	30
5	Karolína Erbanová	(Czech Republic)	6	o	38.19	50	25
6	Nao Kodaira	(Japan)	6	i	38.25	45	—
7	Vanessa Bittner	(Austria)	9	o	38.32	40	
8	Marsha Hudey	(Canada)	5	o	38.45	36	
9	Erina Kamiya	(Japan)	7	i	38.51	32	
10	Nadezhda Aseyeva	(Russia)	2	o	38.65	28	
11	Heather Richardson-Bergsma	(United States)	10	o	38.73	24	
12	Maki Tsuji	(Japan)	7	o	38.77	21	
13	Margot Boer	(Netherlands)	4	i	38.79	18	
14	Yekaterina Shikhova	(Russia)	1	i	38.83	16	
15	Yekaterina Aydova	(Kazakhstan)	3	i	38.88	14	
16	Janine Smit	(Netherlands)	2	i	38.900	12	
17	Anice Das	(Netherlands)	1	o	38.909	10	
18	Floor van den Brandt	(Netherlands)	3	o	38.94	8	
19	Sugar Todd	(United States)	5	i	39.00	6	
20	Kim Min-sun	(South Korea)	4	o	39.03	5	

=== Division B ===
Rank	Name	Nat.	Pair	Lane	Time	WC points
1	Li Qishi	(China)	11	o	38.97	25
2	Shannon Rempel	(Canada)	9	o	39.04	19
3	Hege Bøkko	(Norway)	9	i	39.11	15
4	Kaylin Irvine	(Canada)	10	i	39.14	11
5	Yvonne Daldossi	(Italy)	10	o	39.15	8
6	Kim Hyun-yung	(South Korea)	11	i	39.22	6
7	Anastasia Bucsis	(Canada)	6	o	39.32	4
8	Martine Ripsrud	(Norway)	4	o	39.41	2
9	Mayon Kuipers	(Netherlands)	7	i	39.47	1
10	Zhan Xue	(China)	5	i	39.51	—
11	Elina Risku	(Finland)	8	i	39.60	
12	Park Seung-hi	(South Korea)	6	i	39.70	
13	Kaja Ziomek	(Poland)	3	i	39.82	
14	Nam Ye-won	(South Korea)	5	o	39.84	
15	Shi Xiaoxuan	(China)	4	i	39.85	
16	Hanne Haugland	(Norway)	3	o	39.95	
17	Ksenia Sadovskaya	(Belarus)	7	o	40.02	
18	Paige Schwartzburg	(United States)	8	o	40.27	
19	Tatyana Mikhailova	(Belarus)	2	o	40.43	
20	Ellen Bjertnes	(Norway)	2	i	40.64	
21	Karine Udahl	(Norway)	1	i	41.09	
