= 2015 World Sprint Speed Skating Championships – Women =

Women at the 2015 World Sprint Speed Skating Championships
- Date: 28 February – 1 March 2015
- Competitors: 27 from 15 nations
- Winning points: 149.600

Medalists
gold medal	Brittany Bowe	United States
silver medal	Heather Richardson	United States
bronze medal	Karolína Erbanová	Czech Republic

The women's event of the 2015 World Sprint Speed Skating Championships was held on 28 February – 1 March 2015.

== Day 1 ==
=== 500 m ===
The race was started at 17:30.

Rank	Pair	Lane	Name	Country	Time	Diff
1	11	o	Brittany Bowe	USA	37.59	
2	13	i	Heather Richardson	USA	37.87	+0.28
3	14	o	Karolína Erbanová	CZE	38.04	+0.45
4	9	o	Olga Fatkulina	RUS	38.16	+0.57
5	13	o	Judith Hesse	GER	38.24	+0.65
6	11	i	Thijsje Oenema	NED	38.29	+0.71
7	8	i	Maki Tsuji	JPN	38.32	+0.74
8	14	i	Nao Kodaira	JPN	38.36	+0.77
9	12	i	Margot Boer	NED	38.38	+0.79
10	7	i	Vanessa Bittner	AUT	38.40	+0.81
11	10	o	Li Qishi	CHN	38.49	+0.90
12	5	o	Sugar Todd	USA	38.60	+1.01
13	12	o	Yekaterina Aydova	KAZ	38.62	+1.04
14	10	i	Nadezhda Aseyeva	RUS	38.78	+1.19
15	4	o	Laurine van Riessen	NED	39.17	+1.59
16	6	o	Jang Mi	KOR	39.28	+1.70
17	3	o	Angelina Golikova	RUS	39.30	+1.71
18	9	i	Marsha Hudey	CAN	39.39	+1.80
19	4	i	Li Huawei	CHN	39.43	+1.84
20	7	o	Jessica Gregg	CAN	39.48	+1.89
20	5	i	Yvonne Daldossi	ITA	39.48	+1.89
22	8	o	Heather McLean	CAN	39.53	+1.93
23	3	i	Hege Bøkko	NOR	39.67	+2.09
24	1	i	Elina Risku	FIN	39.69	+2.10
24	6	i	Ayaka Kikuchi	JPN	39.69	+2.10
26	2	i	Tatyana Mikhailova	BLR	39.78	+2.18
27	2	o	Ksenia Sadovskaya	BLR	40.02	+2.43

=== 1000 m ===
The race was started at 19:12.

Rank	Pair	Lane	Name	Country	Time	Diff
1	13	o	Brittany Bowe	USA	1:14.10	
2	13	i	Heather Richardson	USA	1:15.03	+0.93
3	7	o	Margot Boer	NED	1:16.33	+2.23
4	10	o	Yekaterina Aydova	KAZ	1:16.40	+2.30
5	10	i	Olga Fatkulina	RUS	1:16.59	+2.49
6	14	i	Li Qishi	CHN	1:16.79	+2.69
7	11	o	Karolína Erbanová	CZE	1:16.91	+2.81
8	7	i	Thijsje Oenema	NED	1:17.16	+3.06
9	12	i	Judith Hesse	GER	1:17.37	+3.27
10	12	o	Vanessa Bittner	AUT	1:17.40	+3.30
11	9	i	Ayaka Kikuchi	JPN	1:17.58	+3.48
12	9	o	Hege Bøkko	NOR	1:18.21	+4.11
13	3	i	Jang Mi	KOR	1:18.32	+4.22
14	6	i	Nadezhda Aseyeva	RUS	1:18.46	+4.36
15	5	i	Li Huawei	CHN	1:18.78	+4.68
16	5	o	Maki Tsuji	JPN	1:18.98	+4.88
17	4	o	Sugar Todd	USA	1:19.03	+4.93
18	8	i	Jessica Gregg	CAN	1:19.58	+5.48
19	3	o	Marsha Hudey	CAN	1:19.94	+5.84
20	4	i	Angelina Golikova	RUS	1:20.17	+6.07
21	6	o	Tatyana Mikhailova	BLR	1:20.21	+6.11
22	2	i	Yvonne Daldossi	ITA	1:20.44	+6.34
23	2	o	Ksenia Sadovskaya	BLR	1:21.42	+7.32
24	8	o	Heather McLean	CAN	1:21.56	+7.46
25	1	i	Elina Risku	FIN	1:21.75	+7.65
	11	i	Laurine van Riessen	NED	DSQ	
	14	o	Nao Kodaira	JPN	DNS	

== Day 2 ==
=== 500 m ===
The race was started at 18:30.

Rank	Pair	Lane	Name	Country	Time	Diff
1	13	i	Brittany Bowe	USA	37.71	
2	13	o	Heather Richardson	USA	37.90	+0.19
3	11	i	Karolína Erbanová	CZE	38.06	+0.35
4	10	i	Yekaterina Aydova	KAZ	38.18	+0.48
5	11	o	Thijsje Oenema	NED	38.27	+0.56
6	8	i	Judith Hesse	GER	38.35	+0.65
7	12	i	Olga Fatkulina	RUS	38.42	+0.71
8	10	o	Vanessa Bittner	AUT	38.43	+0.72
9	9	i	Li Qishi	CHN	38.52	+0.81
10	12	o	Margot Boer	NED	38.64	+0.93
11	8	o	Nadezhda Aseyeva	RUS	38.65	+0.94
12	9	o	Maki Tsuji	JPN	38.71	+1.00
13	7	i	Sugar Todd	USA	38.77	+1.06
14	4	i	Angelina Golikova	RUS	38.98	+1.27
14	4	o	Marsha Hudey	CAN	38.98	+1.27
14	1	i	Laurine van Riessen	NED	38.98	+1.27
17	3	o	Yvonne Daldossi	ITA	38.99	+1.28
18	5	o	Li Huawei	CHN	39.06	+1.35
19	5	i	Jessica Gregg	CAN	39.08	+1.37
20	1	o	Elina Risku	FIN	39.28	+1.57
21	3	i	Heather McLean	CAN	39.48	+1.77
22	6	i	Jang Mi	KOR	39.61	+1.90
23	7	o	Ayaka Kikuchi	JPN	39.82	+2.11
24	2	i	Ksenia Sadovskaya	BLR	39.86	+2.15
25	6	o	Hege Bøkko	NOR	39.94	+2.23
26	2	o	Tatyana Mikhailova	BLR	40.02	+2.31

=== 1000 m ===
The race was started at 20:09.

Rank	Pair	Lane	Name	Country	Time	Diff
1	12	i	Brittany Bowe	USA	1:14.50	
2	12	o	Heather Richardson	USA	1:15.06	+0.56
3	8	o	Li Qishi	CHN	1:15.85	+1.35
4	10	i	Yekaterina Aydova	KAZ	1:16.01	+1.51
5	11	i	Karolína Erbanová	CZE	1:16.14	+1.64
6	8	i	Vanessa Bittner	AUT	1:16.40	+1.90
7	9	i	Margot Boer	NED	1:16.80	+2.30
8	11	o	Olga Fatkulina	RUS	1:16.88	+2.38
9	10	o	Thijsje Oenema	NED	1:17.30	+2.80
10	9	o	Judith Hesse	GER	1:17.48	+2.98
11	6	i	Sugar Todd	USA	1:17.91	+3.41
12	4	i	Hege Bøkko	NOR	1:18.24	+3.74
13	7	o	Nadezhda Aseyeva	RUS	1:18.29	+3.79
14	7	i	Maki Tsuji	JPN	1:18.39	+3.89
15	2	o	Angelina Golikova	RUS	1:18.70	+4.20
16	4	o	Ayaka Kikuchi	JPN	1:18.74	+4.24
17	6	o	Li Huawei	CHN	1:19.02	+4.52
18	3	o	Jessica Gregg	CAN	1:19.16	+4.66
19	5	o	Jang Mi	KOR	1:19.17	+4.67
20	5	i	Marsha Hudey	CAN	1:19.57	+5.07
21	2	i	Tatyana Mikhailova	BLR	1:19.81	+5.31
22	3	i	Heather McLean	CAN	1:20.09	+5.59
23	1	o	Yvonne Daldossi	ITA	1:20.85	+6.35
24	1	i	Ksenia Sadovskaya	BLR	1:21.74	+7.24

== Overall standings ==
After all events.

Rank	Name	Country	Points	Diff
1st place, gold medalist(s)	Brittany Bowe	USA	149.600	
2nd place, silver medalist(s)	Heather Richardson	USA	150.815	+1.22
3rd place, bronze medalist(s)	Karolína Erbanová	CZE	152.625	+3.03
4	Yekaterina Aydova	KAZ	153.025	+3.43
5	Olga Fatkulina	RUS	153.315	+3.72
6	Li Qishi	CHN	153.330	+3.73
7	Margot Boer	NED	153.585	+3.99
8	Vanessa Bittner	AUT	153.730	+4.13
9	Thijsje Oenema	NED	153.800	+4.20
10	Judith Hesse	GER	154.025	+4.43
11	Maki Tsuji	JPN	155.725	+6.13
12	Nadezhda Aseyeva	RUS	155.805	+6.21
13	Sugar Todd	USA	155.840	+6.24
14	Li Huawei	CHN	157.390	+7.79
15	Jang Mi	KOR	157.645	+8.05
16	Ayaka Kikuchi	JPN	157.670	+8.07
17	Angelina Golikova	RUS	157.715	+8.12
18	Hege Bøkko	NOR	157.845	+8.25
19	Jessica Gregg	CAN	157.930	+8.33
20	Marsha Hudey	CAN	158.125	+8.53
21	Yvonne Daldossi	ITA	159.115	+9.52
22	Tatyana Mikhailova	BLR	159.800	+10.20
23	Heather McLean	CAN	159.825	+10.23
24	Ksenia Sadovskaya	BLR	161.460	+11.86
	Elina Risku	FIN	—	
	Laurine van Riessen	NED	—	
	Nao Kodaira	JPN	—	
