= 2015–16 ISU Speed Skating World Cup – World Cup 5 – Women's 1000 metres =

The women's 1000 metres races of the 2015–16 ISU Speed Skating World Cup 5, arranged in the Sørmarka Arena in Stavanger, Norway, were held on 29 and 30 January 2016.

Jorien ter Mors of the Netherlands won race one, while Brittany Bowe of the United States came second, and Marrit Leenstra of the Netherlands came third. Anice Das of the Netherlands won the first Division B race.

In race two, Bowe won before Leenstra, while Vanessa Bittner of Austria finished in third place. Janine Smit of the Netherlands won the second Division B race.

== Race 1 ==
Race one took place on Friday, 29 January, with Division B scheduled in the morning session, at 12:19, and Division A scheduled in the afternoon session, at 17:10.

=== Division A ===
Rank	Name	Nat.	Pair	Lane	Time	WC points	GWC points
1st place, gold medalist(s)	Jorien ter Mors	(Netherlands)	4	o	1:14.52	100	50
2nd place, silver medalist(s)	Brittany Bowe	(United States)	10	i	1:14.61	80	40
3rd place, bronze medalist(s)	Marrit Leenstra	(Netherlands)	9	i	1:15.59	70	35
4	Olga Fatkulina	(Russia)	7	i	1:15.74	60	30
5	Karolína Erbanová	(Czech Republic)	6	i	1:15.93	50	25
6	Vanessa Bittner	(Austria)	8	i	1:16.00	45	—
7	Li Qishi	(China)	8	o	1:16.394	40	
7	Miho Takagi	(Japan)	6	o	1:16.394	40	
9	Zhang Hong	(China)	9	o	1:16.40	32	
10	Margot Boer	(Netherlands)	5	i	1:16.41	28	
11	Heather Richardson-Bergsma	(United States)	10	o	1:16.48	24	
12	Hege Bøkko	(Norway)	1	i	1:16.98	21	
13	Ida Njåtun	(Norway)	7	o	1:17.22	18	
14	Gabriele Hirschbichler	(Germany)	5	o	1:17.39	16	
15	Nao Kodaira	(Japan)	2	i	1:17.59	14	
16	Ayaka Kikuchi	(Japan)	4	i	1:17.72	12	
17	Yu Jing	(China)	2	o	1:17.74	10	
18	Kaylin Irvine	(Canada)	1	o	1:18.36	8	
19	Erina Kamiya	(Japan)	3	o	1:19.02	6	
20	Maki Tsuji	(Japan)	3	i	1:19.23	5	

=== Division B ===
Rank	Name	Nat.	Pair	Lane	Time	WC points
1	Anice Das	(Netherlands)	4	i	1:16.65	25
2	Martina Sábliková	(Czech Republic)	13	o	1:17.46	19
3	Elizaveta Kazelina	(Russia)	8	i	1:17.49	15
4	Nadezhda Aseyeva	(Russia)	12	o	1:17.70	11
5	Janine Smit	(Netherlands)	11	o	1:17.84	8
6	Natalia Czerwonka	(Poland)	10	o	1:18.09	6
7	Park Seung-hi	(South Korea)	10	i	1:18.18	4
8	Zhan Xue	(China)	4	o	1:18.29	2
9	Yekaterina Aydova	(Kazakhstan)	13	i	1:18.31	1
10	Brianne Tutt	(Canada)	3	i	1:18.35	–
11	Sugar Todd	(United States)	11	i	1:18.53	
12	Kim Hyun-yung	(South Korea)	12	i	1:18.68	
13	Ellen Bjertnes	(Norway)	6	o	1:18.82	
14	Kali Christ	(Canada)	8	o	1:18.97	
15	Paige Schwartzburg	(United States)	9	i	1:19.364	
16	Anastasia Bucsis	(Canada)	5	o	1:19.369	
17	Martine Ripsrud	(Norway)	2	i	1:19.37	
18	Tatyana Mikhailova	(Belarus)	7	i	1:19.38	
19	Yvonne Daldossi	(Italy)	6	i	1:19.47	
20	Ksenia Sadovskaya	(Belarus)	5	i	1:19.75	
21	Kim Min-sun	(South Korea)	9	o	1:20.24	
22	Sofie-Karoline Haugen	(Norway)	2	o	1:20.41	
23	Nam Ye-won	(South Korea)	3	o	1:20.86	
24	Shi Xiaoxuan	(China)	1	i	1:21.44	
25	Elina Risku	(Finland)	7	o	1:22.05	
26	Nikola Zdráhalová	(Czech Republic)	1	o	DQ	

== Race 2 ==
Race two took place on Saturday, 30 January, with Division B scheduled in the morning session, at 10:25, and Division A scheduled in the afternoon session, at 14:55.

=== Division A ===
Rank	Name	Nat.	Pair	Lane	Time	WC points	GWC points
1st place, gold medalist(s)	Brittany Bowe	(United States)	10	i	1:14.35	100	50
2nd place, silver medalist(s)	Marrit Leenstra	(Netherlands)	9	i	1:15.22	80	40
3rd place, bronze medalist(s)	Vanessa Bittner	(Austria)	9	o	1:15.52	70	35
4	Olga Fatkulina	(Russia)	8	o	1:15.68	60	30
5	Heather Richardson-Bergsma	(United States)	10	o	1:15.74	50	25
6	Miho Takagi	(Japan)	6	i	1:16.00	45	—
7	Hege Bøkko	(Norway)	3	i	1:16.02	40	
8	Margot Boer	(Netherlands)	6	o	1:16.06	36	
9	Yekaterina Shikhova	(Russia)	5	i	1:16.15	32	
10	Li Qishi	(China)	8	i	1:16.17	28	
11	Nao Kodaira	(Japan)	3	o	1:16.29	24	
12	Yu Jing	(China)	2	o	1:16.37	21	
13	Sanneke de Neeling	(Netherlands)	4	i	1:16.45	18	
14	Ida Njåtun	(Norway)	7	o	1:16.46	16	
15	Karolína Erbanová	(Czech Republic)	7	i	1:16.65	14	
16	Ayaka Kikuchi	(Japan)	4	o	1:16.76	12	
17	Gabriele Hirschbichler	(Germany)	5	o	1:17.11	10	
18	Kaylin Irvine	(Canada)	1	i	1:17.12	8	
19	Anice Das	(Netherlands)	1	o	1:17.21	6	
20	Maki Tsuji	(Japan)	2	i	1:19.40	5	

=== Division B ===
Rank	Name	Nat.	Pair	Lane	Time	WC points
1	Janine Smit	(Netherlands)	9	i	1:17.09	25
2	Kali Christ	(Canada)	6	i	1:17.77	19
3	Zhan Xue	(China)	8	o	1:17.93	15
4	Sugar Todd	(United States)	9	o	1:18.02	11
5	Park Seung-hi	(South Korea)	8	i	1:18.22	8
6	Nadezhda Aseyeva	(Russia)	11	i	1:18.30	6
7	Kim Hyun-yung	(South Korea)	10	i	1:18.31	4
8	Heather McLean	(Canada)	10	o	1:18.40	2
9	Anastasia Bucsis	(Canada)	4	o	1:18.47	1
10	Tatyana Mikhailova	(Belarus)	6	o	1:18.90	—
11	Martine Ripsrud	(Norway)	3	i	1:19.04	
12	Yvonne Daldossi	(Italy)	4	i	1:19.51	
13	Kim Min-sun	(South Korea)	7	o	1:19.56	
14	Ellen Bjertnes	(Norway)	5	o	1:19.59	
15	Shi Xiaoxuan	(China)	2	o	1:20.03	
16	Shannon Rempel	(Canada)	1	i	1:20.06	
17	Paige Schwartzburg	(United States)	7	i	1:20.13	
18	Ksenia Sadovskaya	(Belarus)	3	o	1:20.17	
19	Elina Risku	(Finland)	5	i	1:20.45	
20	Nam Ye-won	(South Korea)	2	i	1:21.58	
21	Yekaterina Aydova	(Kazakhstan)	11	o	DQ	
