= 2014–15 ISU Speed Skating World Cup – World Cup 3 – Women's 500 metres =

The women's 500 metres races of the 2014–15 ISU Speed Skating World Cup 3, arranged in Sportforum Hohenschönhausen, in Berlin, Germany, were held on the weekend of 5–7 December 2014.

Race one was won by Lee Sang-hwa of South Korea, while Heather Richardson of the United States came second, and Margot Boer of the Netherlands came third. Brittany Bowe of the United States won Division B of race one, and was thus, under the rules, automatically promoted to Division A for race two.

In race two, the top two were the same as in race one, Lee and Richardson, while Nao Kodaira of Japan took the bronze. Jang Mi of South Korea won Division B of race two.

== Race 1 ==
Race one took place on Friday, 5 December, with Division B scheduled in the morning session, at 13:12, and Division A scheduled in the afternoon session, at 17:04.

=== Division A ===
Rank	Name	Nat.	Pair	Lane	Time	WC points	GWC points
1st place, gold medalist(s)	Lee Sang-hwa	(South Korea)	10	i	37.87	100	50
2nd place, silver medalist(s)	Heather Richardson	(United States)	1	i	38.21	80	40
3rd place, bronze medalist(s)	Margot Boer	(Netherlands)	7	i	38.40	70	35
4	Nao Kodaira	(Japan)	10	o	38.41	60	30
5	Judith Hesse	(Germany)	8	i	38.47	50	25
6	Olga Fatkulina	(Russia)	9	o	38.52	45	—
7	Karolína Erbanová	(Czech Republic)	8	o	38.62	40	
8	Vanessa Bittner	(Austria)	6	i	38.68	36	
9	Miyako Sumiyoshi	(Japan)	4	i	38.70	32	
10	Thijsje Oenema	(Netherlands)	7	o	38.72	28	
11	Maki Tsuji	(Japan)	6	o	38.78	24	
12	Bo van der Werff	(Netherlands)	5	o	38.79	21	
13	Floor van den Brandt	(Netherlands)	9	i	38.81	18	
14	Yekaterina Aydova	(Kazakhstan)	5	i	38.82	16	
15	Angelina Golikova	(Russia)	1	o	38.89	14	
16	Anice Das	(Netherlands)	4	o	38.93	12	
17	Nadezhda Aseyeva	(Russia)	3	o	38.98	10	
18	Park Seung-hi	(South Korea)	3	i	39.02	8	
19	Arisa Go	(Japan)	2	i	39.05	6	
20	Lee Bo-ra	(South Korea)	2	o	39.09	5	

=== Division B ===
Rank	Name	Nat.	Pair	Lane	Time	WC points
1	Brittany Bowe	(United States)	5	o	38.62	25
2	Yvonne Daldossi	(Italy)	8	o	39.25	19
3	Yuliya Kozyreva	(Russia)	10	o	39.30	15
4	Marsha Hudey	(Canada)	9	o	39.35	11
5	Heather McLean	(Canada)	7	i	39.386	8
6	Li Huawei	(China)	9	i	39.388	6
7	Alexandra Ianculescu	(Canada)	7	o	39.52	4
8	Gabriele Hirschbichler	(Germany)	8	i	39.69	2
9	Sugar Todd	(United States)	4	o	39.74	1
10	Sha Yuning	(China)	1	i	39.77	—
11	Jang Mi	(South Korea)	10	i	39.78	
12	Jennifer Plate	(Germany)	4	i	39.83	
13	Tamara Oudenaarden	(Canada)	6	o	39.87	
14	Hege Bøkko	(Norway)	2	i	39.99	
15	Zhang Yue	(China)	5	i	40.10	
16	Zhang Xin	(China)	2	o	40.13	
17	Mio Kuroiwa	(Japan)	6	i	40.25	
18	Elina Risku	(Finland)	3	i	40.26	
19	Tatyana Mikhailova	(Belarus)	1	o	40.63	
20	Ksenia Sadovskaya	(Belarus)	3	o	40.87	

== Race 2 ==
Race two took place on Sunday, 7 December, with Division B scheduled in the morning session, at 09:00, and Division A scheduled in the afternoon session, at 12:50.

=== Division A ===
Rank	Name	Nat.	Pair	Lane	Time	WC points	GWC points
1st place, gold medalist(s)	Lee Sang-hwa	(South Korea)	11	o	37.96	100	50
2nd place, silver medalist(s)	Heather Richardson	(United States)	10	o	38.07	80	40
3rd place, bronze medalist(s)	Nao Kodaira	(Japan)	11	i	38.11	70	35
4	Brittany Bowe	(United States)	8	i	38.30	60	30
5	Margot Boer	(Netherlands)	9	o	38.37	50	25
6	Floor van den Brandt	(Netherlands)	5	o	38.42	45	—
7	Vanessa Bittner	(Austria)	7	o	38.45	40	
8	Karolína Erbanová	(Czech Republic)	9	i	38.55	36	
9	Maki Tsuji	(Japan)	6	i	38.57	32	
10	Bo van der Werff	(Netherlands)	5	i	38.58	28	
11	Olga Fatkulina	(Russia)	10	i	38.60	24	
12	Yekaterina Aydova	(Kazakhstan)	4	o	38.67	21	
13	Judith Hesse	(Germany)	8	o	38.68	18	
14	Miyako Sumiyoshi	(Japan)	6	o	38.81	16	
15	Angelina Golikova	(Russia)	4	i	38.96	14	
16	Anice Das	(Netherlands)	3	i	38.97	12	
17	Thijsje Oenema	(Netherlands)	7	i	38.983	10	
18	Park Seung-hi	(South Korea)	3	o	38.987	8	
19	Arisa Go	(Japan)	2	o	39.122	6	
20	Nadezhda Aseyeva	(Russia)	2	i	39.125	5	
21	Lee Bo-ra	(South Korea)	1	i	39.17	4	
22	Li Qishi	(China)	1	o	39.18	3	

=== Division B ===
Rank	Name	Nat.	Pair	Lane	Time	WC points
1	Jang Mi	(South Korea)	6	o	39.25	25
2	Heather McLean	(Canada)	10	o	39.31	19
3	Yuliya Kozyreva	(Russia)	9	i	39.55	15
4	Li Huawei	(China)	9	o	39.59	11
5	Gabriele Hirschbichler	(Germany)	8	o	39.69	8
6	Marsha Hudey	(Canada)	8	i	39.71	6
7	Sha Yuning	(China)	7	o	39.74	4
8	Denise Roth	(Germany)	2	i	39.84	2
9	Hege Bøkko	(Norway)	4	o	39.92	1
10	Tamara Oudenaarden	(Canada)	5	i	39.93	—
11	Jennifer Plate	(Germany)	5	o	39.94	
12	Yvonne Daldossi	(Italy)	10	i	39.95	
13	Sugar Todd	(United States)	6	i	40.05	
14	Alexandra Ianculescu	(Canada)	7	i	40.06	
15	Mio Kuroiwa	(Japan)	2	o	40.13	
16	Zhang Yue	(China)	3	o	40.23	
17	Tatyana Mikhailova	(Belarus)	4	i	40.70	
18	Elina Risku	(Finland)	1	o	40.71	
19	Ksenia Sadovskaya	(Belarus)	3	i	40.95	
