= 2014–15 ISU Speed Skating World Cup – World Cup 4 – Women's 500 metres =

The women's 500 metres races of the 2014–15 ISU Speed Skating World Cup 4, arranged in the Thialf arena in Heerenveen, Netherlands, were held on the weekend of 12–14 December 2014.

Race one was won by Lee Sang-hwa of South Korea, while Nao Kodaira of Japan came second, and Judith Hesse of Germany came third. Angelina Golikova of Russia won Division B of race one, and was thus, under the rules, automatically promoted to Division A for race two.

Race two was won by Heather Richardson of the United States, while Brittany Bowe of the United States came second, and Nao Kodaira of Japan came third. Marsha Hudey of Canada won Division B of race two.

== Race 1 ==
Race one took place on Friday, 12 December, with Division B scheduled in the morning session, at 12:00, and Division A scheduled in the afternoon session, at 16:59.

=== Division A ===
Rank	Name	Nat.	Pair	Lane	Time	WC points	GWC points
1st place, gold medalist(s)	Lee Sang-hwa	(South Korea)	10	i	37.69	100	50
2nd place, silver medalist(s)	Nao Kodaira	(Japan)	10	o	37.70	80	40
3rd place, bronze medalist(s)	Judith Hesse	(Germany)	8	o	37.88	70	35
4	Brittany Bowe	(United States)	2	o	37.95	60	30
5	Heather Richardson	(United States)	5	i	38.01	50	25
6	Thijsje Oenema	(Netherlands)	6	o	38.14	45	—
7	Margot Boer	(Netherlands)	9	i	38.20	40	
8	Bo van der Werff	(Netherlands)	5	o	38.28	36	
9	Karolína Erbanová	(Czech Republic)	7	i	38.29	32	
10	Vanessa Bittner	(Austria)	7	o	38.35	28	
11	Olga Fatkulina	(Russia)	8	i	38.51	24	
12	Maki Tsuji	(Japan)	6	i	38.57	21	
13	Miyako Sumiyoshi	(Japan)	4	o	38.62	18	
14	Nadezhda Aseyeva	(Russia)	1	i	38.63	16	
15	Floor van den Brandt	(Netherlands)	9	o	38.65	14	
16	Park Seung-hi	(South Korea)	2	i	38.75	12	
17	Anice Das	(Netherlands)	3	o	38.83	10	
18	Li Qishi	(China)	3	i	38.89	8	
19	Yekaterina Aydova	(Kazakhstan)	4	i	38.95	6	
20	Jang Mi	(China)	1	o	39.27	5	

=== Division B ===
Rank	Name	Nat.	Pair	Lane	Time	WC points
1	Angelina Golikova	(Russia)	10	i	38.95	25
2	Arisa Go	(Japan)	10	o	39.15	19
3	Heather McLean	(Canada)	8	o	39.28	15
4	Li Huawei	(China)	9	o	39.31	11
5	Alexandra Ianculescu	(Canada)	6	o	39.36	8
6	Zhang Yue	(China)	3	o	39.52	6
7	Lee Bo-ra	(South Korea)	9	i	39.534	4
8	Sugar Todd	(United States)	4	o	39.538	2
9	Denise Roth	(Germany)	7	o	39.54	1
10	Marsha Hudey	(Canada)	8	i	39.59	—
11	Yvonne Daldossi	(Italy)	7	i	39.67	
12	Sha Yuning	(China)	5	i	39.70	
13	Hege Bøkko	(Norway)	4	i	39.72	
14	Gabriele Hirschbichler	(Germany)	6	i	39.76	
15	Elina Risku	(Finland)	2	i	40.14	
16	Mio Kuroiwa	(Japan)	5	o	40.18	
17	Tamara Oudenaarden	(Canada)	3	i	40.21	
18	Yuliya Skokova	(Russia)	1	i	40.35	
19	Ksenia Sadovskaya	(Belarus)	2	o	41.21	

== Race 2 ==
Race two took place on Sunday, 14 December, with Division B scheduled in the morning session, at 11:31, and Division A scheduled in the afternoon session, at 15:47.

=== Division A ===
Rank	Name	Nat.	Pair	Lane	Time	WC points	GWC points
1st place, gold medalist(s)	Heather Richardson	(United States)	10	o	37.72	100	50
2nd place, silver medalist(s)	Brittany Bowe	(United States)	9	i	38.05	80	40
3rd place, bronze medalist(s)	Lee Sang-hwa	(South Korea)	11	o	38.07	70	35
4	Nao Kodaira	(Japan)	11	i	38.16	60	30
5	Judith Hesse	(Germany)	10	i	38.17	50	25
6	Thijsje Oenema	(Netherlands)	8	i	38.19	45	—
7	Margot Boer	(Netherlands)	9	o	38.27	40	
8	Karolína Erbanová	(Czech Republic)	8	o	38.33	36	
9	Maki Tsuji	(Japan)	6	o	38.39	32	
10	Floor van den Brandt	(Netherlands)	4	i	38.45	28	
11	Vanessa Bittner	(Austria)	6	i	38.56	24	
12	Olga Fatkulina	(Russia)	7	o	38.60	21	
13	Bo van der Werff	(Netherlands)	7	i	38.736	18	
14	Miyako Sumiyoshi	(Japan)	5	i	38.737	16	
15	Yekaterina Aydova	(Kazakhstan)	2	o	38.77	14	
16	Nadezhda Aseyeva	(Russia)	5	o	38.87	12	
17	Li Qishi	(China)	3	o	38.997	10	
18	Anice Das	(Netherlands)	3	i	38.998	8	
19	Park Seung-hi	(South Korea)	4	o	39.02	6	
20	Angelina Golikova	(Russia)	1	o	39.09	5	
21	Jang Mi	(South Korea)	2	i	39.21	4	

=== Division B ===
Rank	Name	Nat.	Pair	Lane	Time	WC points
1	Marsha Hudey	(Canada)	7	o	39.14	25
2	Yuliya Kozyreva	(Russia)	2	o	39.32	19
3	Heather McLean	(Canada)	7	i	39.36	15
4	Arisa Go	(Japan)	8	i	39.43	11
5	Lee Bo-ra	(South Korea)	8	o	39.46	8
6	Li Huawei	(China)	6	i	39.490	6
6	Sugar Todd	(United States)	3	i	39.490	6
8	Denise Roth	(Germany)	2	i	39.62	2
9	Yvonne Daldossi	(Italy)	6	o	39.63	1
10	Alexandra Ianculescu	(Canada)	5	i	39.79	—
11	Elina Risku	(Finland)	4	o	40.00	
12	Sha Yuning	(China)	5	o	40.14	
13	Tamara Oudenaarden	(Canada)	3	o	40.19	
14	Zhang Yue	(China)	4	i	40.30	
15	Mio Kuroiwa	(Japan)	1	i	40.87	
16	Ksenia Sadovskaya	(Belarus)	1	o	41.33	
