= 2015–16 ISU Speed Skating World Cup – World Cup 3 – Women's 500 metres =

The women's 500 metres races of the 2015–16 ISU Speed Skating World Cup 3, arranged in Eisstadion Inzell, in Inzell, Germany, were held on 4 and 6 December 2015.

Lee Sang-hwa of South Korea won race one, while Americans Brittany Bowe and Heather Richardson-Bergsma came second and third. Janine Smit of the Netherlands won the first Division B race.

Lee also won race two, with Richardson in second place, and Heather McLean of Canada in third. Kim Hyun-yung of South Korea won the second Division B race.

== Race 1 ==
Race one took place on Friday, 4 December, with Division B scheduled in the afternoon session, at 12:00, and Division A scheduled in the evening session, at 17:04.

=== Division A ===
| Rank | Name | Nat. | Pair | Lane | Time | WC points | GWC points |
|---|---|---|---|---|---|---|---|
| 1st place, gold medalist(s) | Lee Sang-hwa | (South Korea) | 10 | i | 37.33 | 100 | 50 |
| 2nd place, silver medalist(s) | Brittany Bowe | (United States) | 10 | o | 37.70 | 80 | 40 |
| 3rd place, bronze medalist(s) | Heather Richardson-Bergsma | (United States) | 9 | i | 37.99 | 70 | 35 |
| 4 | Heather McLean | (Canada) | 7 | o | 38.01 | 60 | 30 |
| 5 | Vanessa Bittner | (Austria) | 9 | o | 38.08 | 50 | 25 |
| 6 | Olga Fatkulina | (Russia) | 7 | i | 38.15 | 45 | — |
| 7 | Nao Kodaira | (Japan) | 6 | i | 38.17 | 40 | |
| 8 | Erina Kamiya | (Japan) | 8 | o | 38.29 | 36 | |
| 9 | Karolína Erbanová | (Czech Republic) | 5 | i | 38.48 | 32 | |
| 10 | Kim Min-sun | (South Korea) | 3 | o | 38.50 | 28 | |
| 11 | Maki Tsuji | (Japan) | 8 | i | 38.55 | 24 | |
| 12 | Sugar Todd | (United States) | 6 | o | 38.59 | 21 | |
| 13 | Marsha Hudey | (Canada) | 5 | o | 38.621 | 18 | |
| 14 | Margot Boer | (Netherlands) | 3 | i | 38.628 | 16 | |
| 15 | Floor van den Brandt | (Netherlands) | 4 | i | 38.77 | 14 | |
| 16 | Yekaterina Aydova | (Kazakhstan) | 2 | i | 38.78 | 12 | |
| 17 | Kaylin Irvine | (Canada) | 1 | o | 38.84 | 10 | |
| 18 | Arisa Go | (Japan) | 2 | o | 38.97 | 8 | |
| 19 | Nadezhda Aseyeva | (Russia) | 4 | o | 39.07 | 6 | |
| 20 | Li Qishi | (China) | 1 | i | 39.17 | 5 | |

=== Division B ===
| Rank | Name | Nat. | Pair | Lane | Time | WC points |
|---|---|---|---|---|---|---|
| 1 | Janine Smit | (Netherlands) | 8 | i | 38.804 | 25 |
| 2 | Yekaterina Shikhova | (Russia) | 7 | o | 38.805 | 19 |
| 3 | Zhang Xin | (China) | 5 | o | 38.84 | 15 |
| 4 | Marrit Leenstra | (Netherlands) | 8 | o | 38.91 | 11 |
| 5 | Li Huawei | (China) | 2 | o | 38.99 | 8 |
| 6 | Kim Hyun-yung | (South Korea) | 6 | i | 39.04 | 6 |
| 7 | Yvonne Daldossi | (Italy) | 5 | i | 39.20 | 4 |
| 8 | Elina Risku | (Finland) | 4 | i | 39.21 | 2 |
| 9 | Kali Christ | (Canada) | 2 | i | 39.31 | 1 |
| 10 | Bo van der Werff | (Netherlands) | 7 | i | 39.40 | — |
| 11 | Paige Schwartzburg | (United States) | 3 | i | 39.735 | |
| 12 | Hege Bøkko | (Norway) | 6 | o | 39.736 | |
| 13 | Yuliya Kozyreva | (Russia) | 1 | i | 39.76 | |
| 14 | Park Soo-jin | (South Korea) | 4 | o | 39.77 | |
| 15 | Francesca Bettrone | (Italy) | 3 | o | 40.18 | |
| 16 | Tatyana Mikhailova | (Belarus) | 1 | o | 40.31 | |

== Race 2 ==
Race two took place on Sunday, 6 December, with Division B scheduled in the morning session, at 09:45, and Division A scheduled in the afternoon session, at 15:43.

=== Division A ===
| Rank | Name | Nat. | Pair | Lane | Time | WC points | GWC points |
|---|---|---|---|---|---|---|---|
| 1st place, gold medalist(s) | Lee Sang-hwa | (South Korea) | 10 | i | 37.36 | 100 | 50 |
| 2nd place, silver medalist(s) | Heather Richardson-Bergsma | (United States) | 10 | o | 37.84 | 80 | 40 |
| 3rd place, bronze medalist(s) | Heather McLean | (Canada) | 9 | o | 38.02 | 70 | 35 |
| 4 | Erina Kamiya | (Japan) | 8 | o | 38.17 | 60 | 30 |
| 5 | Vanessa Bittner | (Austria) | 9 | i | 38.27 | 50 | 25 |
| 6 | Marsha Hudey | (Canada) | 5 | i | 38.31 | 45 | — |
| 7 | Kim Min-sun | (South Korea) | 5 | o | 38.34 | 40 | |
| 8 | Maki Tsuji | (Japan) | 7 | i | 38.371 | 36 | |
| 9 | Sugar Todd | (United States) | 6 | i | 38.372 | 32 | |
| 10 | Karolína Erbanová | (Czech Republic) | 6 | o | 38.373 | 28 | |
| 11 | Marrit Leenstra | (Netherlands) | 1 | i | 38.39 | 24 | |
| 12 | Floor van den Brandt | (Netherlands) | 4 | i | 38.41 | 21 | |
| 13 | Olga Fatkulina | (Russia) | 8 | i | 38.44 | 18 | |
| 14 | Margot Boer | (Netherlands) | 4 | o | 38.51 | 16 | |
| 15 | Yekaterina Aydova | (Kazakhstan) | 3 | o | 38.52 | 14 | |
| 16 | Nao Kodaira | (Japan) | 7 | o | 38.58 | 12 | |
| 17 | Janine Smit | (Netherlands) | 2 | o | 38.67 | 10 | |
| 18 | Arisa Go | (Japan) | 2 | i | 38.71 | 8 | |
| 19 | Zhang Xin | (China) | 1 | o | 39.09 | 6 | |
| 20 | Nadezhda Aseyeva | (Russia) | 3 | i | 39.17 | 5 | |

=== Division B ===
| Rank | Name | Nat. | Pair | Lane | Time | WC points |
|---|---|---|---|---|---|---|
| 1 | Kim Hyun-yung | (South Korea) | 7 | o | 38.50 | 25 |
| 2 | Yvonne Daldossi | (Italy) | 6 | i | 38.87 | 19 |
| 3 | Letitia de Jong | (Netherlands) | 2 | i | 38.99 | 15 |
| 4 | Hege Bøkko | (Norway) | 6 | o | 39.02 | 11 |
| 5 | Li Huawei | (China) | 5 | i | 39.12 | 8 |
| 6 | Kaylin Irvine | (Canada) | 7 | i | 39.19 | 6 |
| 7 | Park Soo-jin | (South Korea) | 4 | i | 39.31 | 4 |
| 8 | Paige Schwartzburg | (United States) | 3 | i | 39.47 | 2 |
| 9 | Elina Risku | (Finland) | 5 | o | 39.52 | 1 |
| 10 | Yuliya Kozyreva | (Russia) | 3 | o | 39.56 | — |
| 11 | Margarita Ryzhova | (Russia) | 4 | o | 39.80 | |
| 12 | Francesca Lollobrigida | (Italy) | 1 | i | 41.18 | |
| 13 | Hao Jiachen | (China) | 1 | o | DNS | |
| 13 | Zhao Xin | (China) | 2 | o | DNS | |
