= 2016 World Sprint Speed Skating Championships – Women =

Women at the 2016 World Sprint Speed Skating Championships
- Venue: Korea National Training Center, Seoul
- Date: 27–28 February
- Competitors: 29 from 14 nations
- Winning time: 151.595

Medalists
gold medal	Brittany Bowe	United States
silver medal	Heather Richardson-Bergsma	United States
bronze medal	Jorien ter Mors	Netherlands

The women's event of the 2016 World Sprint Speed Skating Championships was held on 27–28 February 2016.

== Results ==
=== 500 m ===
The race was started on 27 February 2016 at 17:02.

Rank	Pair	Lane	Name	Country	Time	Diff
1	15	i	Zhang Hong	CHN	38.11	
2	13	o	Heather Richardson-Bergsma	USA	38.24	+0.13
3	12	o	Nao Kodaira	JPN	38.30	+0.19
4	11	i	Olga Fatkulina	RUS	38.32	+0.21
5	14	i	Brittany Bowe	USA	38.34	+0.23
6	14	o	Jorien ter Mors	NED	38.54	+0.43
7	9	o	Marrit Leenstra	NED	38.62	+0.51
8	8	i	Erina Kamiya	JPN	38.65	+0.54
9	15	o	Yu Jing	CHN	38.73	+0.62
10	8	o	Maki Tsuji	JPN	38.73	+0.63
11	9	i	Karolína Erbanová	CZE	38.79	+0.68
11	12	i	Heather McLean	CAN	38.79	+0.68
13	13	i	Vanessa Bittner	AUT	38.88	+0.77
14	6	i	Yekaterina Aydova	KAZ	38.90	+0.79
15	10	o	Li Qishi	CHN	39.02	+0.91
16	7	o	Nadezhda Aseyeva	RUS	39.04	+0.93
17	6	o	Yekaterina Shikhova	RUS	39.09	+0.98
18	10	i	Sugar Todd	USA	39.14	+1.03
19	7	i	Gabriele Hirschbichler	GER	39.17	+1.06
20	4	i	Hege Bøkko	NOR	39.44	+1.33
21	4	o	Kim Hyun-yung	KOR	39.50	+1.39
22	11	o	Kim Min-sun	KOR	39.51	+1.40
23	2	i	Park Seung-hi	KOR	39.53	+1.42
24	2	o	Martine Ripsrud	NOR	39.63	+1.52
25	5	i	Yvonne Daldossi	ITA	39.71	+1.60
26	5	o	Sanneke de Neeling	NED	39.77	+1.66
27	1	i	Ksenia Sadovskaya	BLR	39.93	+1.82
28	3	o	Tatyana Mikhailova	BLR	40.93	+2.82
29	3	i	Ellen Bjertnes	NOR	DSQ	

=== 1000 m ===
The race was started on 27 February 2016 at 18:44.

Rank	Pair	Lane	Name	Country	Time	Diff
1	13	o	Jorien ter Mors	NED	1:15.09	
2	13	i	Heather Richardson-Bergsma	USA	1:15.37	+0.28
3	14	o	Brittany Bowe	USA	1:15.51	+0.42
4	12	i	Marrit Leenstra	NED	1:16.18	+1.09
5	8	o	Karolína Erbanová	CZE	1:17.09	+2.00
6	12	o	Zhang Hong	CHN	1:17.23	+2.14
7	15	i	Li Qishi	CHN	1:17.30	+2.21
8	14	i	Vanessa Bittner	AUT	1:17.40	+2.31
9	15	o	Olga Fatkulina	RUS	1:17.53	+2.44
10	6	i	Yekaterina Aydova	KAZ	1:17.96	+2.87
11	9	o	Nao Kodaira	JPN	1:17.98	+2.89
11	10	i	Yu Jing	CHN	1:17.98	+2.89
13	5	i	Hege Bøkko	NOR	1:18.08	+2.88
14	10	o	Gabriele Hirschbichler	GER	1:18.30	+3.21
15	7	o	Erina Kamiya	JPN	1:18.47	+3.38
16	11	i	Sanneke de Neeling	NED	1:18.67	+3.58
17	9	i	Nadezhda Aseyeva	RUS	1:18.89	+3.80
18	4	i	Heather McLean	CAN	1:18.94	+3.85
19	6	o	Park Seung-hi	KOR	1:19.23	+4.14
20	8	i	Maki Tsuji	JPN	1:19.24	+4.15
21	7	i	Sugar Todd	USA	1:19.81	+4.72
22	4	o	Kim Hyun-yung	KOR	1:20.05	+4.96
23	11	o	Yekaterina Shikhova	RUS	1:20.09	+5.00
24	3	i	Ellen Bjertnes	NOR	1:20.45	+5.36
25	2	i	Martine Ripsrud	NOR	1:20.98	+5.89
26	3	o	Tatyana Mikhailova	BLR	1:20.99	+5.90
27	5	o	Kim Min-sun	KOR	1:21.57	+6.48
28	1	i	Ksenia Sadovskaya	BLR	1:22.14	+7.05
29	2	o	Yvonne Daldossi	ITA	1:22.87	+7.78

=== 500 m ===
The race was started on 27 February 2016 at 17:00.

Rank	Pair	Lane	Name	Country	Time	Diff
1	15	o	Brittany Bowe	USA	37.86	
2	8	o	Heather McLean	CAN	38.15	+0.29
3	15	i	Heather Richardson-Bergsma	USA	38.20	+0.34
4	14	o	Zhang Hong	CHN	38.37	+0.51
5	13	o	Olga Fatkulina	RUS	38.45	+0.59
6	12	o	Karolína Erbanová	CZE	38.51	+0.65
7	10	i	Yu Jing	CHN	38.54	+0.68
8	14	i	Jorien ter Mors	NED	38.58	+0.72
9	10	o	Yekaterina Aydova	KAZ	38.65	+0.79
10	12	i	Nao Kodaira	JPN	38.67	+0.81
11	9	o	Erina Kamiya	JPN	38.84	+0.98
11	13	i	Marrit Leenstra	NED	38.84	+0.98
13	11	o	Vanessa Bittner	AUT	39.00	+1.14
14	8	i	Nadezhda Aseyeva	RUS	39.09	+1.23
15	9	i	Maki Tsuji	JPN	39.11	+1.25
16	6	o	Hege Bøkko	NOR	39.20	+1.34
16	5	o	Sugar Todd	USA	39.20	+1.34
18	7	o	Gabriele Hirschbichler	GER	39.35	+1.49
19	11	i	Li Qishi	CHN	39.39	+1.53
20	2	o	Yvonne Daldossi	ITA	39.42	+1.56
21	6	i	Yekaterina Shikhova	RUS	39.45	+1.59
22	4	o	Park Seung-hi	KOR	39.59	+1.73
23	7	i	Sanneke de Neeling	NED	39.60	+1.74
24	5	i	Kim Hyun-yung	KOR	39.61	+1.75
25	3	i	Kim Min-sun	KOR	39.80	+1.94
26	4	i	Martine Ripsrud	NOR	39.99	+2.13
27	3	o	Ksenia Sadovskaya	BLR	40.33	+2.47
28	2	i	Tatyana Mikhailova	BLR	40.38	+2.52
29	1	o	Ellen Bjertnes	NOR	40.62	+2.76

=== 1000 m ===
The race was started on 27 February 2016 at 18:44.

Rank	Pair	Lane	Name	Country	Time	Diff
1	12	i	Brittany Bowe	USA	1:15.28	
2	11	i	Jorien ter Mors	NED	1:15.35	+0.07
3	12	o	Heather Richardson-Bergsma	USA	1:15.64	+0.36
4	11	o	Marrit Leenstra	NED	1:16.17	+0.89
5	7	o	Vanessa Bittner	AUT	1:17.14	+1.86
6	8	i	Karolína Erbanová	CZE	1:17.20	+1.92
7	10	i	Zhang Hong	CHN	1:17.69	+2.41
8	9	i	Olga Fatkulina	RUS	1:17.76	+2.48
9	6	i	Gabriele Hirschbichler	GER	1:17.78	+2.50
10	6	o	Li Qishi	CHN	1:17.95	+2.67
11	7	i	Nao Kodaira	JPN	1:18.03	+2.75
12	3	o	Hege Bøkko	NOR	1:18.35	+3.07
13	8	o	Yekaterina Aydova	KAZ	1:18.45	+3.17
14	4	o	Nadezhda Aseyeva	RUS	1:18.84	+3.56
14	9	o	Heather McLean	CAN	1:18.84	+3.56
16	5	i	Yekaterina Shikhova	RUS	1:18.88	+3.60
17	10	o	Yu Jing	CHN	1:19.12	+3.84
18	1	o	Sanneke de Neeling	NED	1:19.21	+3.93
19	4	i	Park Seung-hi	KOR	1:19.22	+3.94
20	5	o	Maki Tsuji	JPN	1:19.91	+4.63
21	3	i	Kim Hyun-yung	KOR	1:19.97	+4.69
22	2	o	Sugar Todd	USA	1:20.10	+4.82
23	2	i	Kim Min-sun	KOR	1:22.86	+7.58
24	1	i	Yvonne Daldossi	ITA	1:23.18	+7.90

=== Overall standings ===
After all events.

Rank	Name	Country	Points	Diff
1st place, gold medalist(s)	Brittany Bowe	USA	151.595	
2nd place, silver medalist(s)	Heather Richardson-Bergsma	USA	151.945	
3rd place, bronze medalist(s)	Jorien ter Mors	NED	152.340	
4	Marrit Leenstra	NED	153.635	
5	Zhang Hong	CHN	153.940	
6	Olga Fatkulina	RUS	154.415	
7	Karolína Erbanová	CZE	154.445	
8	Nao Kodaira	JPN	154.975	
9	Vanessa Bittner	AUT	155.150	
10	Yekaterina Aydova	KAZ	155.755	
11	Yu Jing	CHN	155.820	
12	Heather McLean	CAN	155.830	
13	Li Qishi	CHN	156.035	
14	Gabriele Hirschbichler	GER	156.560	
15	Hege Bøkko	NOR	156.855	
16	Nadezhda Aseyeva	RUS	156.995	
17	Maki Tsuji	JPN	157.425	
18	Yekaterina Shikhova	RUS	158.025	
19	Sugar Todd	USA	158.295	
20	Sanneke de Neeling	NED	158.310	
21	Park Seung-hi	KOR	158.345	
22	Kim Hyun-yung	KOR	159.120	
23	Kim Min-sun	KOR	161.525	
24	Yvonne Daldossi	ITA	162.155	
25	Erina Kamiya	JPN	—	
26	Martine Ripsrud	NOR	—	
27	Ksenia Sadovskaya	BLR	—	
28	Tatyana Mikhailova	BLR	—	
29	Ellen Bjertnes	NOR	—	
