= 2015–16 ISU Speed Skating World Cup – World Cup 5 – Men's sprint combination =

Men's sprint event (2015–2016)

The men's sprint combination of the 2015–16 ISU Speed Skating World Cup 5, arranged in the Sørmarka Arena in Stavanger, Norway, was contested on 29–31 January 2016. It was the only sprint combination competition of the 2015–16 World Cup.

The contest included each skater's best time from the 500 metres and 1000 metres competitions that were raced during the weekend. Pavel Kulizhnikov of Russia had the best combined result, while Dutchmen Kai Verbij and Kjeld Nuis came in second and third place.

== Results ==
Rank	Name	Nat.	500 m (1)	1000 m (1)	500 m (2)	1000 m (2)	Points	GWC points
1st place, gold medalist(s)	Pavel Kulizhnikov	(Russia)	34:71	1:08.10	34.52	1:08.10	68.750	100
2nd place, silver medalist(s)	Kai Verbij	(Netherlands)	34.87	1:08.86	34.91		69.300	80
3rd place, bronze medalist(s)	Kjeld Nuis	(Netherlands)		1:08.12	35.28	1:08.13	69.340	70
4	Aleksey Yesin	(Russia)	34.94	1:09.24	35.01	1:08.92	69.400	60
5	Alexandre St-Jean	(Canada)	35.11	1:09.59	35.15	1:09.08	69.650	50
6	Kim Tae-yun	(South Korea)	34.93	1:09.70	35.04	1:10.45	69.780	—
7	Joey Mantia	(United States)	35.72	1:08.74	35.42	1:08.76	69.790	
8	Ruslan Murashov	(Russia)	34.74		34.78	1:10.21	69.845	
9	Espen Aarnes Hvammen	(Norway)	34.96	1:09.87	34.95	1:10.10	69.885	
10	Mika Poutala	(Finland)	35.01	1:09.87	35.16	1:09.77	69.895	
11	Mo Tae-bum	(South Korea)	35.04	1:09.78		1:10.48	69.930	
12	Laurent Dubreuil	(Canada)	34.88	1:10.23	34.98		69.995	
13	Mitchell Whitmore	(United States)	35.20	1:09.79	35.12		70.015	
14	Jonathan Garcia	(United States)	35.21	1:09.65	35.33	1:30.28	70.035	
14	Gerben Jorritsma	(Netherlands)	35.42	1:09.36	35.58	1:09.23	70.035	
16	Nico Ihle	(Germany)	35.42	1:09.64	35.48	1:09.51	70.175	
17	Mikhail Kazelin	(Russia)	35.49	1:10.46	35.29	1:09.79	70.185	
18	Piotr Michalski	(Poland)	35.34	1:10.04	35.73	1:09.90	70.290	
19	Kim Jin-su	(South Korea)	35.72	1:09.89	35.40	1:37.89	70.345	
20	Jesper Hospes	(Netherlands)	35.46	1:10.21	35.29	1:10.47	70.395	
21	Jang Won-hoon	(South Korea)	35.65	1:10.03	35.40	1:10.39	70.415	
22	Pim Schipper	(Netherlands)	35.83	1:09.72	35.80	1:09.31	70.455	
23	David Bosa	(Italy)	35.57	1:10.37	35.32	1:12.17	70.505	
24	Roman Krech	(Kazakhstan)	35.17	1:11.10	34.96		70.510	
25	Yuto Fujino	(Japan)	35.87	1:10.57	35.60	1:10.03	70.615	
26	Ryohei Haga	(Japan)	34.97	1:11.31	35.35		70.625	
26	Artur Nogal	(Poland)	35.41	1:10.97	35.29	1:10.67	70.625	
28	Mirko Giacomo Nenzi	(Italy)	35.54	1:10.30	35.49	1:10.90	70.640	
29	Xie Jiaxuan	(China)	35.41	1:10.62	35.53	1:11.38	70.720	
30	Pekka Koskela	(Finland)	35.72	1:10.70	35.47	1:11.00	70.820	
31	Daniel Greig	(Australia)	35.54	1:10.82	35.78	1:10.70	70.890	
32	Gao Tingyu	(China)	35.96	1:11.88	35.27	1:11.50	71.020	
33	Mu Zhongsheng	(China)	35.63	1:11.29	35.43	1:11.26	71.060	
34	Håvard Holmefjord Lorentzen	(Norway)	36.06	1:10.34	DQ	1:10.17	71.145	
35	Liu An	(China)	35.72	1:11.20	35.57	1:11.38	71.170	
36	Christoffer Fagerli Rukke	(Norway)	35.95	1:10.72	35.89	1:10.73	71.250	
37	Ignat Golovatsyuk	(Belarus)	35.80	1:11.20	35.89	1:10.96	71.280	
38	Kimani Griffin	(United States)	36.09	1:10.55	36.20	1:10.73	71.365	
39	Hubert Hirschbichler	(Germany)		1:10.43	36.15	1:10.76	71.365	
40	Yuma Murakami	(Japan)	35.39	1:12.21	35.32		71.425	
41	Espen Tveit	(Norway)	35.91	1:11.33	36.14		71.575	
42	Kim Jun-ho	(South Korea)	35.54	1:12.48	35.38	DNS	71.620	
43	Tsukasa Owada	(Japan)	35.76	1:11.75	35.88	1:13.66	71.635	
44	Yang Fan	(China)	36.00	1:11.74	36.29	1:11.30	71.650	
45	Sung Ching-yang	(Chinese Taipei)	36.12	1:12.43	35.85	1:11.84	71.770	
46	Henrik Fagerli Rukke	(Norway)	36.05	1:11.47	36.09		71.785	
47	Mathias Vosté	(Belgium)	36.33	1:12.23	DQ	1:11.62	72.135	
48	Haralds Silovs	(Latvia)	36.57	1:11.17			72.155	
49	Juho Vaittinen	(Finland)	36.28	1:12.28	36.37	1:11.85	72.205	
50	Christian Oberbichler	(Austria)	36.18	1:13.05	36.20	1:12.06	72.210	
51	Tommi Pulli	(Finland)	DNF	1:12.47	36.66	1:11.67	72.495	
52	Yevgeny Kazimirenko	(Belarus)	36.84	1:13.80	36.91	1:14.09	73.740	
53	Armin Hager	(Austria)	37.32	1:13.60	37.37	1:13.18	74.120	
54	Pedro Causil	(Colombia)	37.19	1:14.70	37.63	DNS	74.540	
