= 2015–16 ISU Speed Skating World Cup – World Cup 5 – Men's 1000 metres =

The men's 1000 metres races of the 2015–16 ISU Speed Skating World Cup 5, arranged in the Sørmarka Arena in Stavanger, Norway, were held on 30 and 31 January 2016.

Pavel Kulizhnikov of Russia won race one, while Kjeld Nuis of the Netherlands came second, and Denis Yuskov of Russia came third. Pim Schipper of the Netherlands won the first Division B race.

Kulizhnikov and Nuis also took the top two places in race two, while Thomas Krol of the Netherlands finished in third place. Mikhail Kazelin of Russia won the second Division B race.

== Race 1 ==
Race one took place on Saturday, 30 January, with Division B scheduled in the morning session, at 09:09, and Division A scheduled in the afternoon session, at 14:55.

=== Division A ===
Rank	Name	Nat.	Pair	Lane	Time	WC points	GWC points
1st place, gold medalist(s)	Pavel Kulizhnikov	(Russia)	10	o	1:08.10	100	50
2nd place, silver medalist(s)	Kjeld Nuis	(Netherlands)	10	i	1:08.12	80	40
3rd place, bronze medalist(s)	Denis Yuskov	(Russia)	7	i	1:08.72	70	35
4	Joey Mantia	(United States)	9	o	1:08.74	60	30
5	Kai Verbij	(Netherlands)	8	i	1:08.86	50	25
6	Vincent De Haître	(Canada)	6	i	1:08.95	45	—
7	Aleksey Yesin	(Russia)	7	o	1:09.24	40	
8	Gerben Jorritsma	(Netherlands)	9	i	1:09.36	36	
9	Alexandre St-Jean	(Canada)	6	o	1:09.59	32	
10	Nico Ihle	(Germany)	1	o	1:09.64	28	
11	Jonathan Garcia	(United States)	3	i	1:09.65	24	
12	Shani Davis	(United States)	8	o	1:09.68	21	
13	Kim Tae-yun	(South Korea)	5	o	1:09.70	18	
14	Mitchell Whitmore	(United States)	2	i	1:09.79	16	
15	Mika Poutala	(Finland)	5	i	1:09.870	14	
16	Espen Aarnes Hvammen	(Norway)	2	o	1:09.877	12	
17	Kim Jin-su	(South Korea)	4	i	1:09.89	10	
18	Piotr Michalski	(Poland)	3	o	1:10.04	8	
19	Denis Kuzin	(Kazakhstan)	4	o	1:10.38	6	
20	Roman Krech	(Kazakhstan)	1	i	1:11.10	5	

=== Division B ===
Rank	Name	Nat.	Pair	Lane	Time	WC points
1	Pim Schipper	(Netherlands)	8	o	1:09.72	25
2	Mo Tae-bum	(South Korea)	22	o	1:09.78	19
3	Jang Won-hoon	(South Korea)	22	i	1:10.03	15
4	Richard Maclennan	(Canada)	20	i	1:10.214	11
5	Jesper Hospes	(Netherlands)	6	i	1:10.219	8
6	Laurent Dubreuil	(Canada)	9	o	1:10.23	6
7	Mirko Giacomo Nenzi	(Italy)	18	o	1:10.30	4
8	Håvard Holmefjord Lorentzen	(Norway)	8	i	1:10.34	2
9	David Bosa	(Italy)	20	o	1:10.37	1
10	Hubert Hirschbichler	(Germany)	19	o	1:10.43	—
11	Kimani Griffin	(United States)	19	i	1:10.55	
12	Mikhail Kazelin	(Russia)	5	o	1:10.56	
13	Yuto Fujino	(Japan)	5	i	1:10.57	
14	Taro Kondo	(Japan)	21	o	1:10.60	
15	Xie Jiaxuan	(China)	18	i	1:10.62	
16	Pekka Koskela	(Finland)	17	i	1:10.70	
17	Christoffer Fagerli Rukke	(Norway)	11	o	1:10.72	
18	Daniel Greig	(Australia)	15	o	1:10.82	
19	Artur Nogal	(Poland)	13	o	1:10.97	
20	Haralds Silovs	(Latvia)	16	i	1:11.17	
21	Ignat Golovatsyuk	(Belarus)	3	i	1:11.200	
22	Liu An	(China)	6	o	1:11.208	
23	Mu Zhongsheng	(China)	10	i	1:11.29	
24	Ryohei Haga	(Japan)	4	i	1:11.31	
25	Espen Tveit	(Norway)	7	i	1:11.33	
26	Sebastian Klosinski	(Poland)	14	i	1:11.42	
27	David Andersson	(Sweden)	17	o	1:11.43	
28	Henrik Fagerli Rukke	(Norway)	10	o	1:11.47	
29	Yang Fan	(China)	21	i	1:11.74	
30	Tsukasa Owada	(Japan)	16	o	1:11.75	
31	Gao Tingyu	(China)	2	o	1:11.88	
32	Olivier Jean	(Canada)	7	o	1:12.12	
33	Yuma Murakami	(Japan)	2	i	1:12.21	
34	Mathias Vosté	(Belgium)	12	i	1:12.23	
35	Juho Vaittinen	(Finland)	11	i	1:12.28	
36	Sung Ching-yang	(Chinese Taipei)	13	i	1:12.43	
37	Tommi Pulli	(Finland)	4	o	1:12.47	
38	Kim Jun-ho	(South Korea)	15	i	1:12.48	
39	Christian Oberbichler	(Switzerland)	12	o	1:13.05	
40	Aleksander Puszkarski	(Poland)	3	o	1:13.40	
41	Armin Hager	(Austria)	9	i	1:13.60	
42	Yevgeny Kazimirenko	(Belarus)	1	i	1:13.80	
43	Pedro Causil	(Colombia)	14	o	1:14.70	

== Race 2 ==
Race two took place on Saunday, 31 January, with Division B scheduled in the morning session, at 11:20, and Division A scheduled in the afternoon session, at 15:45.

=== Division A ===
Rank	Name	Nat.	Pair	Lane	Time	WC points	GWC points
1st place, gold medalist(s)	Pavel Kulizhnikov	(Netherlands)	10	o	1:08.10	100	50
2nd place, silver medalist(s)	Kjeld Nuis	(Netherlands)	10	i	1:08.13	80	40
3rd place, bronze medalist(s)	Thomas Krol	(Netherlands)	7	i	1:08.52	70	35
4	Joey Mantia	(United States)	9	o	1:08.76	60	30
5	Aleksey Yesin	(Russia)	8	i	1:08.92	50	25
6	Vincent De Haître	(Canada)	8	o	1:09.03	45	—
7	Alexandre St-Jean	(Canada)	7	o	1:09.08	40	
8	Gerben Jorritsma	(Netherlands)	9	i	1:09.23	36	
9	Pim Schipper	(Netherlands)	1	i	1:09.31	32	
10	Nico Ihle	(Germany)	4	o	1:09.51	28	
11	Mika Poutala	(Finland)	6	i	1:09.77	24	
12	Piotr Michalski	(Poland)	3	i	1:09.90	21	
13	Espen Aarnes Hvammen	(Norway)	3	o	1:10.10	18	
14	Jang Won-hoon	(South Korea)	2	o	1:10.39	16	
15	Kim Tae-yun	(South Korea)	6	o	1:10.45	14	
16	Mo Tae-bum	(South Korea)	2	i	1:10.48	12	
17	Richard Maclennan	(Canada)	1	o	1:10.67	10	
18	Denis Kuzin	(Kazakhstan)	4	i	1:10.89	8	
19	Jonathan Garcia	(United States)	5	o	1:30.28	6	
20	Kim Jin-su	(South Korea)	5	i	1:37.89	5	

=== Division B ===
Rank	Name	Nat.	Pair	Lane	Time	WC points
1	Mikhail Kazelin	(Russia)	11	i	1:09.79	25
2	Yuto Fujino	(Japan)	11	o	1:10.03	19
3	Takuro Oda	(Japan)	2	o	1:10.07	15
4	Håvard Holmefjord Lorentzen	(Norway)	19	o	1:10.17	11
5	Håvard Bøkko	(Norway)	3	o	1:10.18	8
6	Ruslan Murashov	(Russia)	17	o	1:10.21	6
7	Sverre Lunde Pedersen	(Norway)	17	i	1:10.27	4
8	Mikhail Kozlov	(Russia)	4	o	1:10.36	2
9	Shota Nakamura	(Japan)	2	i	1:10.45	1
10	Jesper Hospes	(Netherlands)	21	i	1:10.47	—
11	Bart Swings	(Belgium)	18	o	1:10.53	
12	Taro Kondo	(Japan)	22	o	1:10.64	
13	Artur Nogal	(Poland)	12	o	1:10.67	
14	Daniel Greig	(Australia)	14	i	1:10.70	
15	Christoffer Fagerli Rukke	(Norway)	10	o	1:10.732	
16	Kimani Griffin	(United States)	20	i	1:10.737	
17	Hubert Hirschbichler	(Germany)	20	o	1:10.76	
18	Mirko Giacomo Nenzi	(Italy)	19	i	1:10.90	
19	Ignat Golovatsyuk	(Belarus)	8	i	1:10.96	
20	Olivier Jean	(Canada)	6	o	1:10.98	
21	Zbigniew Bródka	(Poland)	14	o	1:10.99	
22	Pekka Koskela	(Finland)	16	i	1:11.00	
23	Mu Zhongsheng	(China)	7	i	1:11.26	
24	Yang Fan	(China)	22	i	1:11.30	
25	Liu An	(China)	8	o	1:11.381	
26	Xie Jiaxuan	(China)	18	i	1:11.389	
27	Sebastian Klosinski	(Poland)	13	i	1:11.47	
28	David Andersson	(Sweden)	16	o	1:11.49	
29	Gao Tingyu	(China)	6	i	1:11.50	
30	Mathias Vosté	(Belgium)	10	i	1:11.61	
31	Jeffrey Swider-Peltz	(United States)	7	o	1:11.63	
32	Tommi Pulli	(Finland)	5	i	1:11.67	
33	Sung Ching-yang	(Chinese Taipei)	12	i	1:11.84	
34	Juho Vaittinen	(Finland)	9	o	1:11.85	
35	Christian Oberbichler	(Switzerland)	9	i	1:12.06	
36	David Bosa	(Italy)	21	o	1:12.17	
37	Linus Heidegger	(Austria)	1	i	1:12.94	
38	Armin Hager	(Austria)	5	o	1:13.18	
39	Nicholas Goplen	(Canada)	3	i	1:13.42	
40	Tsukasa Owada	(Japan)	15	i	1:13.66	
41	Yevgeny Kazimirenko	(Belarus)	4	i	1:14.09	
42	Pedro Causil	(Colombia)	13	o	DNS	
42	Kim Jun-ho	(South Korea)	15	o	DNS	
