= 2015–16 ISU Speed Skating World Cup – World Cup 5 – Women's allround combination =

The women's allround combination of the 2015–16 ISU Speed Skating World Cup 5, arranged in the Sørmarka Arena in Stavanger, Norway, was contested on 29–31 January 2016. It was the only allround combination competition of the 2015–16 World Cup.

The contest included each skater's time from the 1500 metres and 3000 metres competitions that were raced during the weekend. Martina Sáblíková of the Czech Republic had the best combined result, while Dutch skaters Ireen Wüst and Linda de Vries came in second and third place.

== Results ==
Rank	Name	Nat.	1500 m	3000 m	Points	GWC points
1st place, gold medalist(s)	Martina Sáblíková	(Czech Republic)	2:01.68	4:17.68	78.493	100
2nd place, silver medalist(s)	Ireen Wüst	(Netherlands)	1:56.09	4:04.15	79.387	80
3rd place, bronze medalist(s)	Linda de Vries	(Netherlands)	1:57.30	4:01.80	79.400	70
4	Olga Graf	(Russia)	1:56.72	4:08.63	80.344	60
5	Marije Joling	(Netherlands)	1:58.10	4:05.94	80.356	50
6	Annouk van der Weijden	(Netherlands)	1:57.96	4:07.58	80.583	—
7	Miho Takagi	(Japan)	1:57.11	4:09.37	80.597	
8	Natalya Voronina	(Russia)	1:59.34	4:07.12	80.966	
9	Misaki Oshigiri	(Japan)	1:57.63	4:10.89	81.025	
10	Yuliya Skokova	(Russia)	1:58.53	4:11.26	81.386	
11	Claudia Pechstein	(Germany)	1:59.79	4:08.77	81.391	
12	Ayaka Kikuchi	(Japan)	1:57.71	4:13.46	81.479	
13	Ida Njåtun	(Norway)	1:58.64	4:12.21	81.581	
14	Elizaveta Kazelina	(Russia)	1:59.15	4:11.96	81.709	
15	Luiza Złotkowska	(Poland)	1:59.51	4:11.75	81.794	
16	Ivanie Blondin	(Canada)	2:00.36	4:11.19	81.984	
17	Brianne Tutt	(Canada)	1:59.64	4:12.88	82.026	
18	Natalia Czerwonka	(Poland)	1:58.61	4:15.21	82.071	
19	Bente Kraus	(Germany)	2:02.59	4:09.76	82.489	
20	Nana Takagi	(Japan)	2:00.47	4:14.23	82.527	
21	Hao Jiachen	(China)	2:01.16	4:13.99	82.717	
22	Fuyo Matsuoka	(Japan)	2:01.84	4:12.95	82.771	
23	Josie Spence	(Canada)	2:01.20	4:15.48	82.980	
24	Liu Jing	(China)	2:01.10	4:15.87	83.011	
25	Zhao Xin	(China)	2:01.54	4:16.25	83.221	
26	Francesca Lollobrigida	(Italy)	2:02.20	4:15.43	83.304	
27	Marina Zueva	(Belarus)	2:01.68	4:17.68	83.506	
28	Francesca Bettrone	(Italy)	2:01.88	4:20.92	84.112	
29	Magdalena Czyszczon	(Poland)	2:03.91	4:17.44	84.209	
30	Sofie-Karoline Haugen	(Norway)	2:03.78	4:17.90	84.243	
31	Lim Jung-soo	(South Korea)	2:04.88	4:16.81	84.427	
32	Nikola Zdráhalová	(Czech Republic)	2:02.82	4:21.21	84.475	
33	Natálie Kerschbaummayr	(Czech Republic)	2:04.69	4:18.15	84.588	
34	Saskia Alusalu	(Estonia)	2:04.39	4:18.97	84.624	
35	Marte Vatn	(Norway)	2:04.97	4:21.17	85.184	
36	Nancy Swider-Peltz, Jr.	(United States)	2:06.90	4:22.98	86.130	
37	Elena Møller-Rigas	(Denmark)	2:06.73	4:28.41	86.978	
	Katarzyna Woźniak	(Poland)	2:03:06	DNS		
	Urszula Włodarczyk	(Poland)	2:04.79	DNS		
