= 2015–16 ISU Speed Skating World Cup – World Cup 5 – Men's 500 metres =

The men's 500 metres races of the 2015–16 ISU Speed Skating World Cup 5, arranged in the Sørmarka Arena in Stavanger, Norway, were held on 29 and 31 January 2016.

Pavel Kulizhnikov of Russia won race one, while compatriot Ruslan Murashov came second, and Kai Verbij of the Netherlands came third. Kim Tae-yun of South Korea won the first Division B race.

Kulizhnikov and Murashov also took the top two places in race two, while Gilmore Junio of Canada finished in third place. Gao Tingyu of China won the second Division B race.

== Race 1 ==
Race one took place on Friday, 29 January, with Division B scheduled in the morning session, at 10:59, and Division A scheduled in the afternoon session, at 16:25.

=== Division A ===
Rank	Name	Nat.	Pair	Lane	Time	WC points	GWC points
1st place, gold medalist(s)	Pavel Kulizhnikov	(Russia)	10	i	34.71	100	50
2nd place, silver medalist(s)	Ruslan Murashov	(Russia)	6	i	34.74	80	40
3rd place, bronze medalist(s)	Kai Verbij	(Netherlands)	7	o	34.87	70	35
4	Gilmore Junio	(Canada)	8	o	34.886	60	30
5	Laurent Dubreuil	(Canada)	7	i	34.887	50	25
6	Aleksey Yesin	(Russia)	5	i	34.94	45	—
7	Espen Aarnes Hvammen	(Norway)	5	o	34.96	40	
8	Ryohei Haga	(Japan)	4	i	34.97	36	
9	Mika Poutala	(Finland)	8	i	35.01	32	
10	William Dutton	(Canada)	9	o	35.02	28	
11	Ronald Mulder	(Netherlands)	3	o	35.03	24	
12	Mo Tae-bum	(South Korea)	1	i	35.04	21	
13	Yūya Oikawa	(Japan)	4	o	35.08	18	
14	Alexandre St-Jean	(Canada)	6	o	35.11	16	
15	Artyom Kuznetsov	(Russia)	2	o	35.14	14	
16	Roman Krech	(Kazakhstan)	2	i	35.17	12	
17	Mitchell Whitmore	(United States)	3	i	35.20	10	
18	Artur Waś	(Poland)	9	i	35.22	8	
19	Alex Boisvert-Lacroix	(Canada)	10	o	35.30	6	
20	Piotr Michalski	(Poland)	1	o	35.34	5	

=== Division B ===
Rank	Name	Nat.	Pair	Lane	Time	WC points
1	Kim Tae-yun	(South Korea)	20	o	34.93	25
2	Jonathan Garcia	(United States)	15	i	35.21	19
3	Yuma Murakami	(Japan)	9	i	35.39	15
4	Artur Nogal	(Poland)	18	i	35.411	11
5	Xie Jiaxuan	(China)	16	i	35.412	8
6	Gerben Jorritsma	(Netherlands)	20	i	35.423	6
7	Nico Ihle	(Germany)	19	o	35.426	4
8	Jesper Hospes	(Netherlands)	16	o	35.46	2
9	Mikhail Kazelin	(Russia)	8	i	35.49	1
10	Kim Jun-ho	(South Korea)	17	o	35.543	—
11	Mirko Giacomo Nenzi	(Italy)	15	o	35.545	
12	Daniel Greig	(Australia)	13	o	35.549	
13	David Bosa	(Italy)	19	i	35.57	
14	Mu Zhongsheng	(China)	17	i	35.63	
15	Jang Won-hoon	(South Korea)	3	i	35.65	
16	Pekka Koskela	(Finland)	18	o	35.720	
17	Liu An	(China)	13	i	35.723	
17	Joey Mantia	(United States)	8	o	35.723	
19	Kim Jin-su	(South Korea)	5	i	35.724	
20	Tsukasa Owada	(Japan)	14	o	35.76	
21	Ignat Golovatsyuk	(Belarus)	5	o	35.80	
22	Pim Schipper	(Netherlands)	10	o	35.83	
23	Yuto Fujino	(Japan)	6	i	35.87	
24	Espen Tveit	(Norway)	6	o	35.91	
25	Christoffer Fagerli Rukke	(Norway)	7	i	35.95	
26	Gao Tingyu	(China)	10	i	35.96	
27	Yang Fan	(China)	7	o	36.00	
28	Henrik Fagerli Rukke	(Norway)	11	o	36.05	
29	Håvard Holmefjord Lorentzen	(Norway)	9	o	36.06	
30	Kimani Griffin	(United States)	12	i	36.09	
31	Sung Ching-yang	(Chinese Taipei)	14	i	36.12	
32	Christian Oberbichler	(Switzerland)	12	o	36.18	
33	Juho Vaittinen	(Finland)	11	i	36.28	
34	Mathias Vosté	(Belgium)	1	i	36.33	
35	Haralds Silovs	(Latvia)	4	i	36.57	
36	Yevgeny Kazimirenko	(Belarus)	3	o	36.84	
37	Pedro Causil	(Colombia)	2	i	37.19	
38	Armin Hager	(Austria)	2	o	37.32	
39	Tommi Pulli	(Finland)	4	o	DNF	

== Race 2 ==
Race two took place on Sunday, 31 January, with Division B scheduled in the morning session, at 09:45, and Division A scheduled in the afternoon session, at 14:30.

=== Division A ===
Rank	Name	Nat.	Pair	Lane	Time	WC points	GWC points
1st place, gold medalist(s)	Pavel Kulizhnikov	(Russia)	10	i	34.52	100	50
2nd place, silver medalist(s)	Ruslan Murashov	(Russia)	7	o	34.78	80	40
3rd place, bronze medalist(s)	Gilmore Junio	(Canada)	9	i	34.86	70	35
4	Kai Verbij	(Netherlands)	6	i	34.91	60	30
5	Espen Aarnes Hvammen	(Norway)	5	o	34.95	50	25
6	Roman Krech	(Kazakhstan)	3	o	34.96	45	—
7	William Dutton	(Canada)	8	o	34.97	40	
8	Laurent Dubreuil	(Canada)	9	o	34.98	36	
9	Alex Boisvert-Lacroix	(Canada)	10	o	35.014	32	
10	Aleksey Yesin	(Russia)	6	o	35.018	28	
11	Kim Tae-yun	(South Korea)	2	o	35.04	24	
12	Yūya Oikawa	(Japan)	4	o	35.05	21	
13	Artyom Kuznetsov	(Russia)	2	i	35.06	18	
14	Mitchell Whitmore	(United States)	3	i	35.12	16	
15	Alexandre St-Jean	(Canada)	5	i	35.15	14	
16	Mika Poutala	(Finland)	8	i	35.16	12	
17	Artur Waś	(Poland)	7	i	35.17	10	
18	Yuma Murakami	(Japan)	1	o	35.32	8	
19	Jonathan Garcia	(United States)	1	i	35.33	6	
20	Ryohei Haga	(Japan)	4	i	35.35	5	

=== Division B ===
Rank	Name	Nat.	Pair	Lane	Time	WC points
1	Gao Tingyu	(China)	5	o	35.27	25
2	Kjeld Nuis	(Netherlands)	17	i	35.28	19
3	Jesper Hospes	(Netherlands)	14	i	35.295	15
3	Artur Nogal	(Poland)	18	o	35.295	15
5	Mikhail Kazelin	(Russia)	13	o	35.296	8
6	David Bosa	(Italy)	19	o	35.32	6
7	Kim Jun-ho	(South Korea)	15	o	35.38	4
8	Jang Won-hoon	(South Korea)	10	o	35.402	2
9	Kim Jin-su	(South Korea)	9	o	35.407	1
10	Joey Mantia	(United States)	9	i	35.42	—
11	Mu Zhongsheng	(China)	15	i	35.43	
12	Pekka Koskela	(Finland)	16	o	35.47	
13	Nico Ihle	(Germany)	18	i	35.48	
14	Mirko Giacomo Nenzi	(Italy)	14	o	35.49	
15	Xie Jiaxuan	(China)	16	i	35.53	
16	Liu An	(China)	12	o	35.57	
17	Gerben Jorritsma	(Netherlands)	19	i	35.58	
18	Yuto Fujino	(Japan)	6	i	35.60	
19	Piotr Michalski	(Poland)	17	o	35.73	
20	Daniel Greig	(Australia)	11	i	35.78	
21	Pim Schipper	(Netherlands)	7	i	35.80	
22	Sung Ching-yang	(Chinese Taipei)	13	i	35.85	
23	Tsukasa Owada	(Japan)	12	i	35.88	
24	Ignat Golovatsyuk	(Belarus)	8	i	35.895	
25	Christoffer Fagerli Rukke	(Norway)	5	i	35.899	
26	Henrik Fagerli Rukke	(Norway)	4	o	36.09	
27	Espen Tveit	(Norway)	6	o	36.14	
28	Hubert Hirschbichler	(Germany)	7	o	36.15	
29	Christian Oberbichler	(Switzerland)	10	i	36.202	
30	Kimani Griffin	(United States)	11	o	36.205	
31	Yang Fan	(China)	4	i	36.29	
32	Juho Vaittinen	(Finland)	8	o	36.37	
33	Tommi Pulli	(Finland)	1	o	36.66	
34	Yevgeny Kazimirenko	(Belarus)	2	i	36.91	
35	Armin Hager	(Austria)	1	i	37.37	
36	Pedro Causil	(Colombia)	2	o	37.63	
37	Håvard Holmefjord Lorentzen	(Norway)	3	i	DQ	
37	Mathias Vosté	(Belgium)	3	o	DQ	
