= 2015–16 ISU Speed Skating World Cup – World Cup 5 =

The fifth competition weekend of the 2015–16 ISU Speed Skating World Cup was held in the Sørmarka Arena in Stavanger, Norway, from Friday, 29 January, until Sunday, 31 January 2016.

== Schedule ==
The detailed schedule of events:

Date	Session	Events	Comment
Friday, 29 January	Morning	10:30: 500 m women (1); 10:59: 500 m men (1); 12:19: 1000 m women (1); 13:22: 1500 m men	Division B
Friday, 29 January	Afternoon	16:00: 500 m women (1); 16:25: 500 m men (1); 17:10: 1000 m women (1); 18:00: 1500 m men	Division A
Saturday, 30 January	Morning	08:45: 500 m women (2); 09:09: 1000 m men (1); 10:29: 1500 m women 11:47: 5000 m men	Division B
Saturday, 30 January	Afternoon	14:30: 500 m women (2); 14:55: 1000 m men (1); 15:45: 1500 m women 16:43: 5000 m men	Division A
Sunday, 31 January	Morning	09:45: 500 m men (2); 10:25: 1000 m women (2); 11:20: 1000 m men (2); 12:35: 3000 m women	Division B
Sunday, 31 January	Afternoon	14:30: 500 m men (2); 14:55: 1000 m women (2); 15:45: 1000 m men (2); 16:35: 3000 m women	Division A

All times are CET (UTC+1).

== Medal summary ==
=== Men's events ===
Event	Race #	Gold	Time	Silver	Time	Bronze	Time	Report
500 m	1	Pavel Kulizhnikov; Russia	34.71	Ruslan Murashov; Russia	34.74	Kai Verbij; Netherlands	34.87	
500 m	2	Pavel Kulizhnikov; Russia	34.52	Ruslan Murashov; Russia	34.78	Gilmore Junio; Canada	34.86	
1000 m	1	Pavel Kulizhnikov; Russia	1:08.10	Kjeld Nuis; Netherlands	1:08.12	Denis Yuskov; Russia	1:08.72	
1000 m	2	Pavel Kulizhnikov; Russia	1:08.10	Kjeld Nuis; Netherlands	1:08.13	Thomas Krol; Netherlands	1:08.52	
1500 m		Denis Yuskov; Russia	1:44.94	Bart Swings; Belgium	1:45.88	Kjeld Nuis; Netherlands	1:46.11	
5000 m		Sven Kramer; Netherlands	6:15.71	Jorrit Bergsma; Netherlands	6:17.59	Ted-Jan Bloemen; Canada	6:18.05	
Sprint combination		Pavel Kulizhnikov; Russia	68.570	Kai Verbij; Netherlands	69.300	Kjeld Nuis; Netherlands	69.340	
Allround combination		Bart Swings; Belgium	73.459	Sverre Lunde Pedersen; Norway	73.694	Håvard Bøkko; Norway	73.951	

=== Women's events ===
Event	Race #	Gold	Time	Silver	Time	Bronze	Time	Report
500 m	1	Zhang Hong; China	37.82	Yu Jing; China	37.93	Jorien ter Mors; Netherlands	37.99	
500 m	2	Yu Jing; China	37.63	Zhang Hong; China	37.82	Heather McLean; Canada	38.02	
1000 m	1	Jorien ter Mors; Netherlands	1:14.52	Brittany Bowe; United States	1:14.61	Marrit Leenstra; Netherlands	1:15.59	
1000 m	2	Brittany Bowe; United States	1:14.35	Marrit Leenstra; Netherlands	1:15.22	Vanessa Bittner; Austria	1:15.52	
1500 m		Martina Sáblíková; Czech Republic	1:55.44	Brittany Bowe; United States	1:55.47	Marrit Leenstra; Netherlands	1:55.93	
3000 m		Martina Sáblíková; Czech Republic	4:00.08	Ireen Wüst; Netherlands	4:04.15	Irene Schouten; Netherlands	4:05.51	
Sprint combination		Jorien ter Mors; Netherlands	75.250	Brittany Bowe; United States	75.275	Vanessa Bittner; Austria	75.760	
Allround combination		Martina Sáblíková; Czech Republic	78.493	Ireen Wüst; Netherlands	79.387	Linda de Vries; Netherlands	79.400	
