= 2015–16 ISU Speed Skating World Cup – World Cup 5 – Men's allround combination =

The men's allround combination of the 2015–16 ISU Speed Skating World Cup 5, arranged in the Sørmarka Arena in Stavanger, Norway, was contested on 29–31 January 2016. It was the only allround combination competition of the 2015–16 World Cup.

The contest included each skater's time from the 1500 metres and 5000 metres competitions that were raced during the weekend. Bart Swings of Belgium had the best combined result, while Norwegian skaters Sverre Lunde Pedersen and Håvard Bøkko came in second and third place.

== Results ==
Rank	Name	Nat.	1500 m	5000 m	Points	GWC points
1st place, gold medalist(s)	Bart Swings	(Belgium)	1:45.88	6:21.66	73.459	100
2nd place, silver medalist(s)	Sverre Lunde Pedersen	(Norway)	1:46.98	6:20.34	73.694	80
3rd place, bronze medalist(s)	Håvard Bøkko	(Norway)	1:46.80	6:23.51	73.951	70
4	Ted-Jan Bloemen	(Canada)	1:49.02	6:18.05	74.145	60
5	Patrick Roest	(Netherlands)	1:48.09	6:23.35	74.365	50
6	Douwe de Vries	(Netherlands)	1:48.46	6:22.33	74.386	—
7	Patrick Beckert	(Germany)	1:49.73	6:21.00	74.676	
8	Konrad Niedźwiedzki	(Poland)	1:47.07	6:31.41	74.831	
9	Andrea Giovannini	(Italy)	1:49.07	6:25.49	74.905	
10	Nicola Tumolero	(Italy)	1:48.97	6:26.33	74.956	
11	Sergey Trofimov	(Russia)	1:47.66	6:34.44	75.330	
12	Zbigniew Bródka	(Poland)	1:47.81	6:34.06	75.342	
13	Liu Yiming	(China)	1:48.98	6:30.76	75.402	
14	Benjamin Donnelly	(Canada)	1:48.35	6:33.59	75.475	
15	Shota Nakamura	(Japan)	1:48.55	6:34.86	75.669	
16	Simen Spieler Nilsen	(Norway)	1:49.45	6:32.27	75.710	
17	Shane Williamson	(Japan)	1:49.52	6:33.26	75.832	
18	Moritz Geisreiter	(Germany)	1:50.73	6:29.38	75.848	
19	Danil Sinitsyn	(Russia)	1:49.42	6:33.99	75.872	
20	Michele Malfatti	(Italy)	1:50.08	6:33.79	76.072	
21	Piotr Puszkarski	(Poland)	1:49.37	6:38.48	76.304	
22	Sebastian Druszkiewicz	(Czech Republic)	1:51.54	6:31.48	76.328	
23	Danila Semerikov	(Russia)	1:50.45	6:35.84	76.400	
24	Vitaly Mikhailov	(Belarus)	1:50.60	6:37.14	76.580	
25	Arjan Stroetinga	(Netherlands)	1:49.52	6:42.68	76.774	
26	Kim Cheol-min	(South Korea)	1:51.06	6:38.24	76.844	
27	Moon Hyun-woong	(South Korea)	1:51.02	6:40.37	77.043	
28	Dmitry Babenko	(Kazakhstan)	1:52.11	6:37.60	77.130	
29	Sun Longjiang	(China)	1:50.95	6:41.80	77.163	
30	Jeffrey Swider-Peltz	(United States)	1:50.67	6:42.73	77.163	
31	Joo Hyung-joon	(South Korea)	1:49.19	6:48.78	77.274	
32	Konrád Nagy	(Hungary)	1:48.38	6:53.44	74.470	
33	Alex Ochowicz	(United States)	1:51.62	6:44.98	77.704	
34	Nicholas Goplen	(Canada)	1:51.44	6:47.48	77.894	
35	K. C. Boutiette	(United States)	1:53.10	6:45.41	78.241	
36	Viktor Hald-Thorup	(Denmark)	1:50.79	6:59.48	78.878	
–	Jan Szymański	(Poland)	1:46.89	DNF		
–	Linus Heidegger	(Austria)	1:49.73	DQ		
