= 2015–16 ISU Speed Skating World Cup – Men's sprint combination =

The men's sprint combination in the 2015–16 ISU Speed Skating World Cup was contested over the 500 and 1000 metre distances on a single World Cup occasion, in Stavanger, Norway, on 29–31 January 2016.

The sprint combination was a new event for the season.

== Top three ==
| Position | Athlete |
|---|---|
| 1 | (Russia) Pavel Kulizhnikov |
| 2 | (Netherlands) Kai Verbij |
| 3 | (Netherlands) Kjeld Nuis |

== Race medallists ==
| WC # | Location | Date | Gold | Time | Silver | Time | Bronze | Time | Report |
|---|---|---|---|---|---|---|---|---|---|
| 5 | Stavanger, Norway | 29–31 January | Pavel Kulizhnikov; Russia | 68.570 | Kai Verbij; Netherlands | 69.300 | Kjeld Nuis; Netherlands | 69.340 | |
