= 2015–16 ISU Speed Skating World Cup – World Cup 5 – Women's 1500 metres =

The women's 1500 metres race of the 2015–16 ISU Speed Skating World Cup 5, arranged in the Sørmarka Arena in Stavanger, Norway, was held on 30 January 2016.

Martina Sáblíková of the Czech Republic won the race, while Brittany Bowe of the United States came second, and Marrit Leenstra of the Netherlands came third. Olga Graf of Russia won the Division B race.

== Results ==
The race took place on Friday, 29 January, with Division B scheduled in the morning session, at 10:29, and Division A scheduled in the afternoon session at 15:45.

=== Division A ===
Rank	Name	Nat.	Pair	Lane	Time	WC points	GWC points
1st place, gold medalist(s)	Martina Sáblíková	(Czech Republic)	9	o	1:55.44	100	100
2nd place, silver medalist(s)	Brittany Bowe	(United States)	10	o	1:55.47	80	80
3rd place, bronze medalist(s)	Marrit Leenstra	(Netherlands)	9	i	1:55.93	70	70
4	Ireen Wüst	(Netherlands)	1	i	1:56.09	60	60
5	Miho Takagi	(Japan)	7	i	1:57.11	50	50
6	Linda de Vries	(Netherlands)	1	o	1:57.30	45	—
7	Misaki Oshigiri	(Japan)	7	o	1:57.63	40	
8	Ayaka Kikuchi	(Japan)	6	i	1:57.71	36	
9	Marije Joling	(Netherlands)	8	o	1:58.10	32	
10	Natalia Czerwonka	(Poland)	5	i	1:58.61	28	
11	Ida Njåtun	(Norway)	8	i	1:58.64	24	
12	Heather Richardson-Bergsma	(United States)	10	i	1:58.85	21	
13	Elizaveta Kazelina	(Russia)	3	i	1:59.15	18	
14	Natalya Voronina	(Russia)	6	o	1:59.34	16	
15	Luiza Złotkowska	(Poland)	4	o	1:59.51	14	
16	Gabriele Hirschbichler	(Germany)	2	o	1:59.86	12	
17	Nana Takagi	(Japan)	3	o	2:00.47	10	
18	Kali Christ	(Canada)	5	o	2:00.85	8	
19	Hao Jiachen	(China)	4	i	2:01.16	6	
20	Zhao Xin	(China)	2	i	2:01.54	5	

=== Division B ===
Rank	Name	Nat.	Pair	Lane	Time	WC points
1	Olga Graf	(Russia)	12	o	1:56.72	25
2	Annouk van der Weijden	(Netherlands)	6	i	1:57.96	19
3	Yuliya Skokova	(Russia)	10	i	1:58.53	15
4	Brianne Tutt	(Canada)	13	o	1:59.64	11
5	Claudia Pechstein	(Germany)	10	o	1:59.79	8
6	Ivanie Blondin	(Canada)	14	i	2:00.36	6
7	Liu Jing	(China)	12	i	2:01.10	4
8	Josie Spence	(Canada)	11	i	2:01.20	2
9	Marina Zueva	(Belarus)	9	i	2:01.68	1
10	Fuyo Matsuoka	(Japan)	3	i	2:01.84	—
11	Francesca Bettrone	(Italy)	11	o	2:01.88	
12	Francesca Lollobrigida	(Italy)	6	o	2:02.20	
13	Bente Kraus	(Germany)	8	i	2:02.59	
14	Paige Schwartzburg	(United States)	14	o	2:02.73	
15	Nikola Zdráhalová	(Czech Republic)	9	o	2:02.82	
16	Katarzyna Woźniak	(Poland)	13	i	2:03.06	
17	Yekaterina Aydova	(Kazakhstan)	5	i	2:03.37	
18	Ellen Bjertnes	(Norway)	7	i	2:03.71	
19	Sofie-Karoline Haugen	(Norway)	4	i	2:03.78	
20	Magdalena Czyszczon	(Poland)	2	o	2:03.91	
21	Saskia Alusalu	(Estonia)	7	o	2:04.39	
22	Natálie Kerschbaummayr	(Czech Republic)	8	o	2:04.69	
23	Urszula Włodarczyk	(Poland)	2	i	2:04.79	
24	Lim Jung-soo	(South Korea)	5	o	2:04.88	
25	Marte Vatn	(Norway)	3	o	2:04.97	
26	Inga Anne Vasaasen	(Norway)	4	o	2:05.64	
27	Elena Møller-Rigas	(Denmark)	1	o	2:06.73	
28	Nancy Swider-Peltz, Jr.	(United States)	1	i	2:06.90	
