= 2015–16 ISU Speed Skating World Cup – Women's sprint combination =

Women's sprint competition in 2016

The women's sprint combination in the 2015–16 ISU Speed Skating World Cup was contested over the 500 and 1000 metre distances on a single World Cup occasion, in Stavanger, Norway, on 29–31 January 2016.

The sprint combination was a new event for the season.

== Top three ==
| Position | Athlete |
|---|---|
| 1 | (Netherlands) Jorien ter Mors |
| 2 | (United States) Brittany Bowe |
| 3 | (Austria) Vanessa Bittner |

== Race medallists ==
| WC # | Location | Date | Gold | Time | Silver | Time | Bronze | Time | Report |
|---|---|---|---|---|---|---|---|---|---|
| 5 | Stavanger, Norway | 29–31 January | Jorien ter Mors; Netherlands | 75.250 | Brittany Bowe; United States | 75.275 | Vanessa Bittner; Austria | 75.760 | |
