= 2015–16 ISU Speed Skating World Cup – Men's allround combination =

The men's allround combination in the 2015–16 ISU Speed Skating World Cup will be contested over the 1500 and 5000 metre distances on a single World Cup occasion, in Stavanger, Norway, on 29–31 January 2016.

The allround combination is a new event for the season.

== Top three ==
Position	Athlete
1	(Belgium) Bart Swings
2	(Norway) Sverre Lunde Pedersen
3	(Norway) Håvard Bøkko

== Race medallists ==
WC #	Location	Date	Gold	Time	Silver	Time	Bronze	Time	Report
5	Stavanger, Norway	29–30 January	Bart Swings; Belgium	73.459	Sverre Lunde Pedersen; Norway	73.694	Håvard Bøkko; Norway	73.951	
