= 2015–16 ISU Speed Skating World Cup – World Cup 5 – Women's 3000 metres =

The women's 3000 metres race of the 2015–16 ISU Speed Skating World Cup 5, arranged in the Sørmarka Arena in Stavanger, Norway, was held on 31 January 2016.

Martina Sáblíková of the Czech Republic won the race, while Ireen Wüst and Irene Schouten, both of the Netherlands, came second came second and third. Linda de Vries of the Netherlands won the Division B race.

== Results ==
The race took place on Sunday, 31 January, with Division B scheduled in the morning session, at 12:35, and Division A scheduled in the afternoon session, at 16:35.

=== Division A ===
Rank	Name	Nat.	Pair	Lane	Time	WC points	GWC points
1st place, gold medalist(s)	Martina Sáblíková	(Czech Republic)	8	i	4:00.08	100	100
2nd place, silver medalist(s)	Ireen Wüst	(Netherlands)	1	o	4:04.15	80	80
3rd place, bronze medalist(s)	Irene Schouten	(Netherlands)	7	i	4:05.51	70	70
4	Marije Joling	(Netherlands)	6	i	4:05.94	60	60
5	Natalya Voronina	(Russia)	8	o	4:07.12	50	50
6	Annouk van der Weijden	(Netherlands)	5	o	4:07.58	45	—
7	Olga Graf	(Russia)	7	o	4:08.63	40	
8	Claudia Pechstein	(Germany)	5	i	4:08.77	35	
9	Miho Takagi	(Japan)	4	o	4:09.37	30	
10	Misaki Oshigiri	(Japan)	4	i	4:10.89	25	
11	Isabelle Weidemann	(Canada)	2	i	4:11.00	21	
12	Ivanie Blondin	(Canada)	6	o	4:11.19	18	
13	Elizaveta Kazelina	(Russia)	3	i	4:11.96	16	
14	Ida Njåtun	(Norway)	3	o	4:12.21	14	
15	Josie Spence	(Canada)	1	i	4:15.48	12	
16	Zhao Xin	(China)	2	o	4:16.25	10	

=== Division B ===
Rank	Name	Nat.	Pair	Lane	Time	WC points
1	Linda de Vries	(Netherlands)	6	o	4:01.80	32
2	Bente Kraus	(Germany)	12	i	4:09.76	27
3	Yuliya Skokova	(Russia)	5	i	4:11.26	23
4	Luiza Złotkowska	(Poland)	13	o	4:11.75	19
5	Anna Yurakova	(Russia)	11	i	4:12.15	15
6	Brianne Tutt	(Canada)	5	o	4:12.88	11
7	Fuyo Matsuoka	(Japan)	12	o	4:12.95	9
8	Ayaka Kikuchi	(Japan)	13	i	4:13.46	7
9	Hao Jiachen	(China)	9	i	4:13.99	6
10	Nana Takagi	(Japan)	14	i	4:14.23	5
11	Natalia Czerwonka	(Poland)	9	o	4:15.21	4
12	Francesca Lollobrigida	(Italy)	14	o	4:15.43	3
13	Liu Jing	(China)	10	o	4:15.87	2
14	Lim Jung-soo	(South Korea)	4	o	4:16.81	1
15	Magdalena Czyszczon	(Poland)	1	i	4:17.44	—
16	Marina Zueva	(Belarus)	11	o	4:17.68	
17	Sofie-Karoline Haugen	(Norway)	6	i	4:17.89	
18	Camilla Lund	(Norway)	4	i	4:18.07	
19	Natálie Kerschbaummayr	(Czech Republic)	3	o	4:18.14	
20	Saskia Alusalu	(Estonia)	7	o	4:18.97	
21	Marit Fjellanger Bøhm	(Norway)	1	o	4:19.99	
22	Francesca Bettrone	(Italy)	8	o	4:20.92	
23	Marte Vatn	(Norway)	2	i	4:21.17	
24	Nikola Zdráhalová	(Czech Republic)	8	i	4:21.20	
25	Nancy Swider-Peltz, Jr.	(United States)	3	i	4:22.98	
26	Elena Møller-Rigas	(Denmark)	2	o	4:28.41	
27	Urszula Włodarczyk	(Poland)	7	i	DNS	
27	Katarzyna Woźniak	(Poland)	10	i	DNS	
