= 2015–16 ISU Speed Skating World Cup – Women's allround combination =

The women's allround combination in the 2015–16 ISU Speed Skating World Cup will be contested over the 1500 and 3000 metre distances on a single World Cup occasion, in Stavanger, Norway, on 29–31 January 2016.

The allround combination is a new event for the season.

== Top three ==
Position	Athlete
1	(Czech Republic) Martina Sáblíková
2	(Netherlands) Ireen Wüst
3	(Netherlands) Linda de Vries

== Race medallists ==
WC #	Location	Date	Gold	Time	Silver	Time	Bronze	Time	Report
5	Stavanger, Norway	30–31 January	Martina Sáblíková; Czech Republic	78.493	Ireen Wüst; Netherlands	79.387	Linda de Vries; Netherlands	79.400	
