= 2015–16 ISU Speed Skating World Cup – World Cup 5 – Men's 1500 metres =

The men's 1500 metres race of the 2015–16 ISU Speed Skating World Cup 5, arranged in the Sørmarka Arena in Stavanger, Norway, was held on 29 January 2016.

Denis Yuskov of Russia won the race, while Bart Swings of Belgium came second, and Kjeld Nuis of the Netherlands came third. Zbigniew Bródka of Poland won the Division B race.

== Results ==
The race took place on Friday, 29 January, with Division B scheduled in the morning session, at 13:22, and Division A scheduled in the afternoon session, at 18:00.

=== Division A ===
Rank	Name	Nat.	Pair	Lane	Time	WC points	GWC points
1st place, gold medalist(s)	Denis Yuskov	(Russia)	9	i	1:44.94	100	100
2nd place, silver medalist(s)	Bart Swings	(Belgium)	8	i	1:45.88	80	80
3rd place, bronze medalist(s)	Kjeld Nuis	(Netherlands)	10	o	1:46.11	70	70
4	Thomas Krol	(Netherlands)	9	o	1:46.45	60	60
5	Shani Davis	(United States)	7	i	1:46.73	50	50
6	Joey Mantia	(United States)	10	i	1:46.74	45	—
7	Håvard Bøkko	(Norway)	6	i	1:46.80	40	
8	Jan Szymański	(Poland)	7	o	1:46.89	36	
9	Sverre Lunde Pedersen	(Norway)	8	o	1:46.98	32	
10	Konrad Niedźwiedzki	(Poland)	6	o	1:47.07	28	
11	Sergey Trofimov	(Russia)	4	o	1:47.66	24	
12	Haralds Silovs	(Latvia)	2	i	1:48.13	21	
13	Li Bailin	(China)	5	o	1:48.65	18	
14	Vincent De Haître	(Canada)	5	i	1:48.76	16	
15	Andrea Giovannini	(Italy)	2	o	1:49.07	14	
16	Takuro Oda	(Japan)	3	i	1:49.18	12	
17	Joo Hyung-joon	(South Korea)	3	o	1:49.19	10	
18	Denis Kuzin	(Kazakhstan)	1	o	1:50.13	8	
19	Sindre Henriksen	(Norway)	4	i	1:50.15	6	
20	Jeffrey Swider-Peltz	(United States)	1	i	1:50.67	5	

=== Division B ===
Rank	Name	Nat.	Pair	Lane	Time	WC points
1	Zbigniew Bródka	(Poland)	19	o	1:47.81	25
2	Patrick Roest	(Netherlands)	11	o	1:48.09	19
3	Mikhail Kozlov	(Russia)	7	o	1:48.24	15
4	Benjamin Donnelly	(Canada)	14	o	1:48.35	11
5	Konrád Nagy	(Hungary)	18	o	1:48.38	8
6	Douwe de Vries	(Netherlands)	8	o	1:48.46	6
7	Shota Nakamura	(Japan)	14	i	1:48.55	4
8	Taro Kondo	(Japan)	5	i	1:48.70	2
9	Magnus Myhren Kristensen	(Norway)	5	o	1:48.71	1
10	Nicola Tumolero	(Italy)	2	i	1:48.97	—
11	Liu Yiming	(China)	8	i	1:48.98	
12	Ted-Jan Bloemen	(Canada)	19	i	1:49.02	
13	David Andersson	(Sweden)	17	o	1:49.35	
14	Piotr Puszkarski	(Poland)	13	o	1:49.37	
15	Danil Sinitsyn	(Russia)	17	i	1:49.42	
16	Simen Spieler Nilsen	(Norway)	7	i	1:49.45	
17	Arjan Stroetinga	(Netherlands)	4	o	1:49.526	
18	Shane Williamson	(Japan)	6	i	1:49.528	
19	Patrick Beckert	(Germany)	15	i	1:49.733	
20	Linus Heidegger	(Austria)	12	o	1:49.735	
21	Olivier Jean	(Canada)	16	o	1:49.75	
22	Michele Malfatti	(Italy)	2	o	1:50.08	
23	Hubert Hirschbichler	(Germany)	15	o	1:50.34	
24	Danila Semerikov	(Russia)	3	o	1:50.45	
25	Vitaly Mikhailov	(Russia)	18	i	1:50.60	
26	Moritz Geisreiter	(Germany)	10	o	1:50.73	
27	Viktor Hald Thorup	(Denmark)	12	i	1:50.79	
28	Sun Longjiang	(China)	10	i	1:50.95	
29	Moon Hyun-woong	(South Korea)	4	i	1:51.02	
30	Kim Cheol-min	(South Korea)	16	i	1:51.06	
31	Nicholas Goplen	(Canada)	6	o	1:51.44	
32	Sebastian Druszkiewicz	(Czech Republic)	1	i	1:51.54	
33	Alex Ochowicz	(United States)	3	i	1:51.62	
34	Aleksander Puszkarski	(Poland)	9	o	1:52.07	
35	Dmitry Babenko	(Kazakhstan)	13	i	1:52.11	
36	K. C. Boutiette	(United States)	11	i	1:53.10	
37	Armin Hager	(Austria)	9	i	1:53.41	
