= 2015–16 ISU Speed Skating World Cup – World Cup 5 – Men's 5000 metres =

The men's 5000 metres race of the 2015–16 ISU Speed Skating World Cup 5, arranged in the Sørmarka Arena in Stavanger, Norway, was held on 30 January 2016.

Sven Kramer of the Netherlands won the race, while his compatriot Jorrit Bergsma came second, and Ted-Jan Bloemen of Canada came third. Patrick Roest of the Netherlands won the Division B race.

== Results ==
The race took place on Saturday, 30 January, with Division B scheduled in the morning session, at 11:47, and Division A scheduled in the afternoon session, at 16:43.

=== Division A ===
| Rank | Name | Nat. | Pair | Lane | Time | WC points | GWC points |
|---|---|---|---|---|---|---|---|
| 1st place, gold medalist(s) | Sven Kramer | (Netherlands) | 8 | o | 6:15.71 | 100 | 100 |
| 2nd place, silver medalist(s) | Jorrit Bergsma | (Netherlands) | 8 | i | 6:17.59 | 80 | 80 |
| 3rd place, bronze medalist(s) | Ted-Jan Bloemen | (Canada) | 6 | i | 6:18.05 | 70 | 70 |
| 4 | Sverre Lunde Pedersen | (Norway) | 7 | i | 6:20.34 | 60 | 60 |
| 5 | Patrick Beckert | (Germany) | 7 | o | 6:21.00 | 50 | 50 |
| 6 | Bart Swings | (Belgium) | 6 | o | 6:21.66 | 45 | — |
| 7 | Douwe de Vries | (Netherlands) | 5 | i | 6:22.33 | 40 | |
| 8 | Håvard Bøkko | (Norway) | 2 | i | 6:23.51 | 35 | |
| 9 | Andrea Giovannini | (Italy) | 4 | i | 6:25.490 | 30 | |
| 9 | Aleksandr Rumyantsev | (Russia) | 3 | o | 6:25.490 | 30 | |
| 11 | Moritz Geisreiter | (Germany) | 4 | o | 6:29.38 | 21 | |
| 12 | Jordan Belchos | (Canada) | 3 | i | 6:30.79 | 18 | |
| 13 | Yevgeny Seryaev | (Russia) | 2 | o | 6:31.55 | 16 | |
| 14 | Ryosuke Tsuchiya | (Japan) | 1 | o | 6:37.09 | 14 | |
| 15 | Arjan Stroetinga | (Netherlands) | 5 | o | 6:42.68 | 12 | |
| 16 | Viktor Hald Thorup | (Denmark) | 1 | i | 6:59.48 | 10 | |

=== Division B ===
| Rank | Name | Nat. | Pair | Lane | Time | WC points |
|---|---|---|---|---|---|---|
| 1 | Patrick Roest | (Netherlands) | 7 | o | 6:23.35 | 32 |
| 2 | Nicola Tumolero | (Italy) | 10 | i | 6:26.33 | 27 |
| 3 | Thomas-Henrik Søfteland | (Norway) | 14 | o | 6:28.72 | 23 |
| 4 | Liu Yiming | (China) | 6 | i | 6:30.76 | 19 |
| 5 | Konrad Niedźwiedzki | (Poland) | 12 | o | 6:31.41 | 15 |
| 6 | Sebastian Druszkiewicz | (Czech Republic) | 1 | i | 6:31.48 | 11 |
| 7 | Simen Spieler Nilsen | (Norway) | 8 | o | 6:32.27 | 9 |
| 8 | Shane Williamson | (Japan) | 16 | o | 6:33.26 | 7 |
| 9 | Benjamin Donnelly | (Canada) | 11 | o | 6:33.59 | 6 |
| 10 | Michele Malfatti | (Italy) | 15 | i | 6:33.79 | 5 |
| 11 | Danil Sinitsyn | (Russia) | 14 | i | 6:33.99 | 4 |
| 12 | Zbigniew Bródka | (Poland) | 7 | i | 6:34.06 | 3 |
| 13 | Sergey Trofimov | (Russia) | 4 | o | 6:34.44 | 2 |
| 14 | Shota Nakamura | (Japan) | 3 | o | 6:34.86 | 1 |
| 15 | Danila Semerikov | (Russia) | 6 | o | 6:35.84 | — |
| 16 | Vitaly Mikhailov | (Belarus) | 16 | i | 6:37.14 | |
| 17 | Dmitry Babenko | (Kazakhstan) | 17 | o | 6:37.60 | |
| 18 | Kim Cheol-min | (South Korea) | 12 | i | 6:38.24 | |
| 19 | Piotr Puszkarski | (Poland) | 9 | o | 6:38.48 | |
| 20 | Adrian Wielgat | (Poland) | 9 | i | 6:40.05 | |
| 21 | Moon Hyun-woong | (South Korea) | 4 | i | 6:40.37 | |
| 22 | Sun Longjiang | (China) | 13 | i | 6:41.80 | |
| 23 | Jeffrey Swider-Peltz | (United States) | 5 | o | 6:42.73 | |
| 24 | Martin Hänggi | (Switzerland) | 8 | i | 6:44.49 | |
| 25 | Alex Ochowicz | (United States) | 2 | o | 6:44.98 | |
| 26 | K. C. Boutiette | (United States) | 5 | i | 6:45.41 | |
| 27 | Takuro Ogawa | (Japan) | 11 | i | 6:46.57 | |
| 28 | Nicholas Goplen | (Canada) | 3 | i | 6:47.48 | |
| 29 | Joo Hyung-joon | (South Korea) | 13 | o | 6:48.78 | |
| 30 | Konrád Nagy | (Hungary) | 2 | i | 6:53.44 | |
| 31 | Jan Szymański | (Poland) | 15 | o | DNF | |
| 32 | Ole Bjørnsmoen Næss | (Norway) | 17 | i | DQ | |
| 32 | Linus Heidegger | (Austria) | 10 | o | DQ | |
