= Hanne Haugland (speed skater) =

Norwegian speed skater

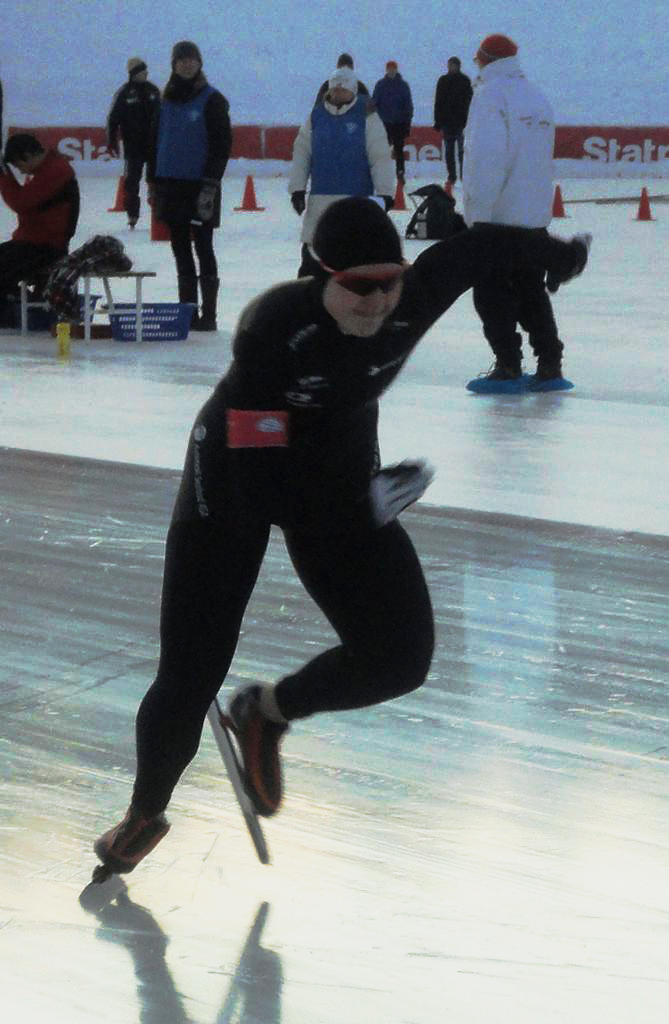
Hanne Haugland

Hanne Skjønhaug Haugland (Norwegian: [ˈhɑ̂nːə ˈhæ̂ʉɡlɑn]; born 7 September 1991) is a Norwegian speed skater specialising in 500m and 1000m races. She won the Norwegian Sprint Championship in 2012, and was single distance champion on 500m in 2010 and on 1000m in 2012. Haugland made 3 starts in the World Cup in 2010 and 2012, but is yet to qualify for the A group. Haugland represents Austevoll IK and as of 2012 is coached by Peter Mueller in Team CBA.
