= Mikhail Kazelin =

Russian speed skater

Personal information
- Born: 19 September 1996 (age 29) Kirovo-Chepetsk, Russia
- Height: 1.80 m (5 ft 11 in)
- Weight: 75 kg (165 lb)

Sport
- Country: Russia
- Sport: Speed skating

Mikhail Sergeyevich Kazelin (Russian: Михаил Сергеевич Казелин, born 19 September 1996) is a Russian speed skater.

== Career ==
In November 2015 Kazelin won the 1000m event at the Junior World Cup in Groningen. That season he won the overall 500m competition. He took part in the first competition weekend of the 2018–19 ISU Speed Skating World Cup where he finished 10th in the 1500m Division B event.

== Personal records ==
Personal records
Men's speed skating
Event	Result	Date	Location	Notes
500 m	34.87	3 December 2017	Olympic Oval, Calgary	
1000 m	1:09.79	31 January 2016	Sørmarka Arena, Stavanger	
1500 m	1:48.40	25 October 2018	Kolomna Speed Skating Center, Kolomna	
3000 m	3:51.01	4 February 2013	Kolomna Speed Skating Center, Kolomna	
5000 m	6:42.88	11 March 2013	Kolomna Speed Skating Center, Kolomna	

== Personal life ==
He is the twinbrother of speed skater Elizaveta Kazelina.
