= Kimani Griffin =

American speed skater (born 1990)

Personal information
- Nationality: United States
- Born: July 2, 1990 (age 36) Winston-Salem, North Carolina, U.S.

Sport
- Sport: Speed skating

Kimani Griffin (born July 2, 1990) is an American speed skater who competes internationally. He participated at the 2018 Winter Olympics.

== Biography ==
Griffin is from Winston-Salem, North Carolina and graduated from Richard J. Reynolds High School.

He competed at the 2018 Winter Olympics.
