= Espen Tveit =

Norwegian speed skater

Espen Tveit (Norwegian: [ˈɛ̂spn̩ ˈtvæɪt]; born 31 December 1991) is a Norwegian speed skater specialising in the 500, 1000 and 1500 distances. He represents Herkules IF in Skien, and began training with the KIA Speed Skating Academy in Inzell, Germany, in 2012. Tveit's best placing to date at a Norwegian Championship is 4th, on the 1500 m in 2012, and he made his World Cup debut during the 2011–12 season, finishing 17th in the B division of the 1500 m.

Tveit was selected for the opening races of the 2012–13 World Cup season after winning four of four races at a Norwegian Cup meeting in Hamar on 10 and 11 November 2012.
