= Brianne Tutt =

Canadian speed skater

Personal information
- Born: June 9, 1992 (age 34) Airdrie, Alberta
- Height: 1.75 m (5 ft 9 in)
- Weight: 60 kg (130 lb; 9.4 st)

Sport
- Country: Canada
- Sport: Speed skating

Brianne Tutt (born June 9, 1992) is a Canadian speedskater from Airdrie, Alberta.

She skated in the 1500 m event at the 2014 Winter Olympics. Just over a year before the Sochi Olympics, Tutt was run over by another skater as she stood waiting to do a practice start at the Calgary Olympic Oval. The collision resulted in severe injuries to Tutt including two broken neck vertebrae, fractured skull, two broken ribs, broken collar bone, hearing loss, Bells Pasly and a concussion. Despite this prognosis, Tutt would overcome most of these injuries with only hearing loss, nagging neck pain, and concussion symptoms as a long-term result.

== Olympics ==
=== 2014 Winter Olympics ===
Tutt competing in her first Olympic games skated in the 1500 meter race in Sochi.

=== 2018 Winter Olympics ===
Tutt qualified to compete for Canada at the 2018 Winter Olympics.

== ISU World Cup ==
Tutt skated in the ISU World Cup in 2013, 2014, 2015, and 2016. She is presently a member of the Speed Skating Canada National Team Senior Pool. She had her best finish at a world cup in 2016, 4th place in the B group 1500m. She also represented Canada at her first World Championships finishing 21st.

== Personal life ==
Her father, Brian Tutt, played professional hockey in North America and Europe, and represented Canada at the 1992 Winter Olympics in Albertville, France, winning a silver medal.
