= Marsha Hudey =

Canadian speed skater

Personal information
- Born: August 3, 1990 (age 36) White City, Saskatchewan
- Height: 1.57 m (5 ft 2 in)

Sport
- Country: Canada
- Sport: Speed skating

Marsha Hudey is a Canadian speedskater from White City, Saskatchewan. She skated in the 500 m event at the 2014 Winter Olympics. At the 2007 Canada Winter Games Hudey won two gold medals as a competitor for Saskatchewan.

== Career ==
=== 2018 Winter Olympics ===
Hudey qualified to compete for Canada at the 2018 Winter Olympics.
