= Hege Bøkko =

Norwegian speed skater

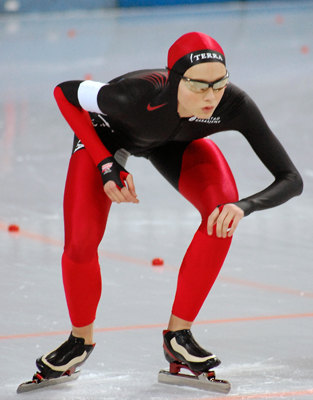
- National Championship single distances, Hamar 2 November 2008

Personal information
- Born: 5 September 1991 (age 34) Hønefoss
- Height: 173 cm (5.68 ft)

Sport
- Country: Norway
- Sport: Speed skating

Hege Bøkko (Norwegian: [ˈhêːɡə ˈbœ̂kːʊ]; born 5 September 1991) is a Norwegian long-track speedskater, and the younger sister of Håvard Bøkko.

== Personal life ==
Hege was born in Hønefoss in Buskerud county, Norway in 1991, but she has been living in Hovet, Buskerud her whole life. She has two older brothers, amongst them is Håvard Bøkko.

Hege has been interested in ice skating all her life, but she also played other sports during her youth. She has been ice skating since the age of three, and from a young age has attended lesser contests at the local ice skating stadium in Hol.

From 1997 to 2004 she attended Hovet School. From 2004 to 2007 she attended Hol Lower Secondary School in Geilo. From 2007 to 2010, she attended Gol Upper Secondary School.

== 2008/2009 season ==
Competing at the 2009 Norwegian senior national championships at individual distances, while still at junior age 17, she won gold medals at the 500-m and 1000-m events, the bronze medal at the 1500-m and a fourth place at the 3000-m, very nearly accomplishing four medals in four events. She holds several national records for the younger year classes.

In the first ever Junior World Cup speedskating event organised by the International Skating Union, in Inzell, 28–30 November 2008, Bøkko won the 1500-m and became number three in the 500-m and 1000-m. At the second Junior World Cup, organised one week later in Asker, Bøkko won the 1000-m and came second in the 500-m.

Competing for the first time in the senior class, Bøkko won six medals over two days in the Norwegian 2009 championships at Gol, 20–21 December 2008; gold in the 500-m, silver in the 1500-m, bronze in the 3000-m and 5000-m (where the results also are valid as that season's national championships single distances event), as well as in the allround samalogue.

On 3 January 2009, Bøkko managed the feat of winning three competitions in two different cities – after reaching the required 3000-m qualification time for participation in the European Allround Championship, skating the distance in 4:24.59 at Hamar, she went on to win both distances in the Norwegian Junior Sprint Championships at Valle Hovin in Oslo. She won in fact all four events at the latter championships event, each time with a better result than that of the best senior skater.

At her European Allround Championships debut at age 17, January 2009, she set two personal bests and ended up ranked no. 15, just 0.039 points away from securing Norway an extra position for the World Allround Championships. She also took part in the 2009 World Sprint Championships, where her best race was the second 1000-m in a time of 1:19.04.

== Personal records ==
Personal records
Women's speed skating
Event	Result	Date	Location	Notes
500 m	37.43	25 February 2017	Olympic Oval, Calgary	
1000 m	1:13.81	10 December 2017	Utah Olympic Oval, Salt Lake City	
1500 m	1:56.56	3 December 2017	Olympic Oval, Calgary	
3000 m	4:12.81	12 February 2011	Olympic Oval, Calgary	
5000 m	7:42.10	6 November 2011	Sørmarka Arena, Stavanger	

She is currently in 120th position in the adelskalender.
