= Tatsiana Mikhailava =

Belarusian speed skater

Personal information
- Nationality: Belarusian
- Born: 18 January 1987 (age 39)
- Height: 1.64 m (5 ft 5 in)
- Weight: 62 kg (137 lb)
- Spouse: Vitaly Mikhailov

Sport
- Country: Belarus
- Sport: Speed skating
- Coached by: Siep Hoekstra
Medal record
European Championships
Bronze medal – third place	2020 Heerenven	Team pursuit

Tatsiana Mikhailava (Belarusian: Тацяна Міхайлава) also known as Tatyana Mikhailova (born 18 January 1987) is a Belarusian speed skater. She competed in the women's mass start event during the 2018 Winter Olympics.

She was influenced to take the sport of speed skating by her husband, Vitaly Mikhailov who is also a fellow Belarusian speed skater and a national record holder. Coincidentally, both Tatsiana Mikhailava and Vitaly Mikhailov made their Olympic debuts at the 2018 Winter Olympics.
