= Kseniya Sadouskaya =

Belarusian speed skater

Personal information
- Nationality: Belarusian
- Born: 17 March 1991 (age 34)

Sport
- Sport: Speed skating

Kseniya Sadouskaya (born 17 March 1991) is a Belarusian speed skater. She competed in the women's 500 metres at the 2018 Winter Olympics.

== Records ==
=== Personal records ===
Personal records
Women's speed skating
Event	Result	Date	Location	Notes
500 m	38,89	08.12.2017	Salt Lake City	
1000 m	1.19,57	18.11.2017	Calgary	
1500 m	2.04,64	07.11.2015	Calgary	
3000 m	4.41,52	28.11.2015	Minsk	
5000 m	8.21,63	20.03.2010	Minsk	
