= Elina Risku =

Finnish speed skater

Personal information
- Nationality: Finnish
- Born: 7 March 1992 (age 33) Seinäjoki, Finland

Sport
- Sport: Speed skating

Elina Risku (born 7 March 1992) is a Finnish speed skater. She competed in the women's 500 metres at the 2018 Winter Olympics.
