= Sugar Todd =

American speed skater

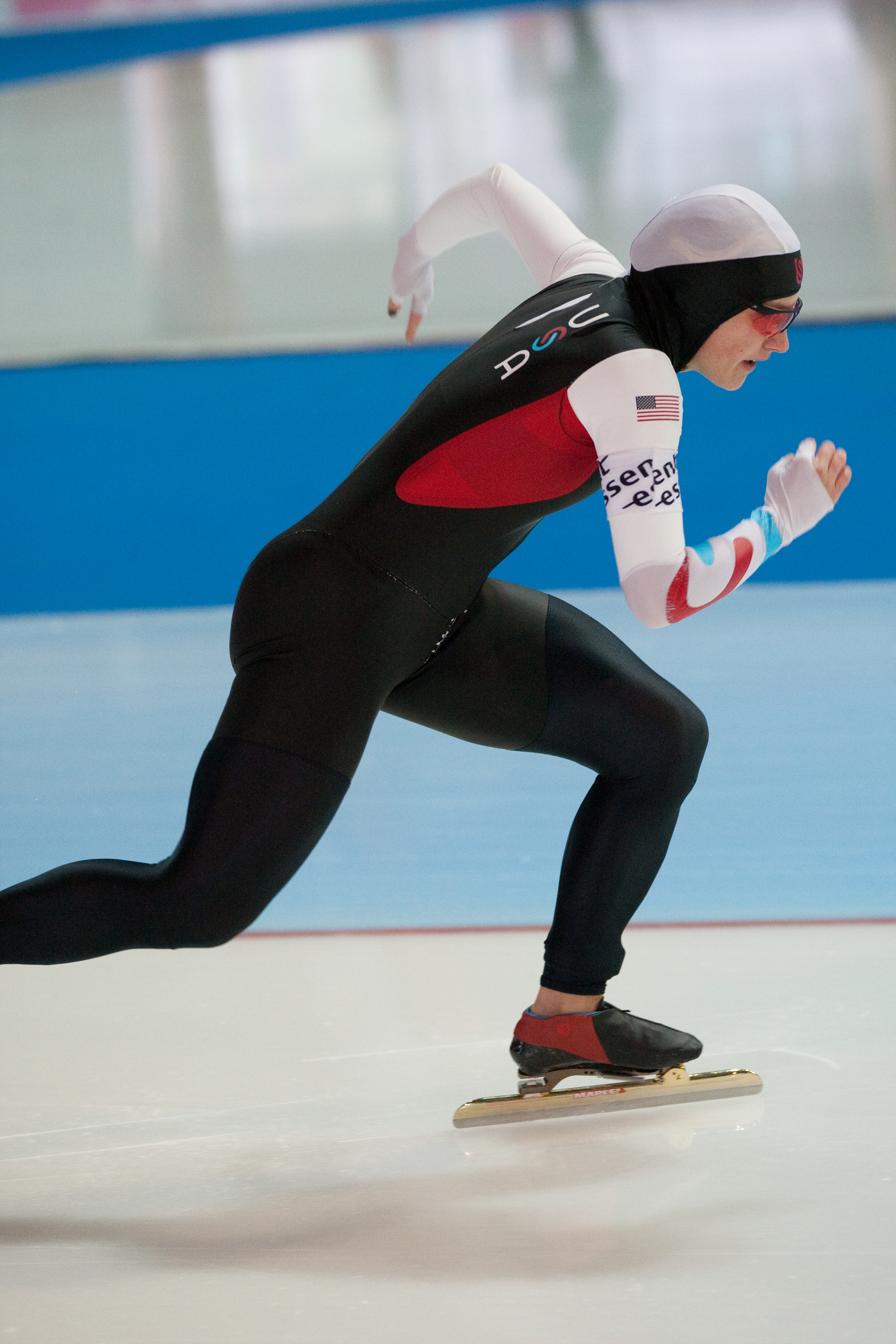
- Sugar Todd skating the 1500 meters at a 2013 World Cup event

Personal information
- Born: July 19, 1990 (age 35) Omaha, Nebraska
- Height: 5 ft 5 in (165 cm)
- Weight: 141 lb (64 kg)

Sport
- Country: United States
- Sport: Speed skating
- Coached by: Ryan Shimabukuro

Sugar Raeshelle-Faye Chelsea Todd (born July 19, 1990) is an American speed skater who qualified for the 2014 Winter Olympics in the 500-meter and 1000-meter events. Todd began speed skating at age eight and quickly excelled at the sport, convincing her parents to move to Wisconsin to further her training. In 2003, she set five national records and won the United States and North American titles for her age group. From 2008–2010, she made the junior world team. In 2010, she participated in the Olympic trials and made her first senior World Cup team.

Todd relocated to Salt Lake City, Utah, in 2012 to train with the national team. In 2013, she placed third in the 1000-meters at the national championships. At the 2014 Olympic trials, she set three personal bests en route to a third-place finish in the 1000-meters and fourth-place finishes in the 500-meter and 1500-meter events. At the Olympics, she placed 29th in the 500-meters and 32nd in the 1000-meters.

== Early life ==
Sugar Raeshelle-Faye Chelsea Todd was born July 19, 1990, in Omaha, Nebraska, to parents Mike and Diana Todd. Todd's parents considered giving her a more conventional first name. However, after she was born, they affectionately called her Sugar and decided that it would be her given name. She grew up on a Nebraskan farm. At age eight, a flyer prompted Todd to join the Omaha Speedskating Club. She quickly discovered she had a passion for the sport and convinced her family to move to Milwaukee the following year so that she could train at the Pettit National Ice Center.

Todd graduated from Wauwatosa East High School in 2008.

== Speed-skating career ==
In February 2003, Todd won the midget girls (age 11–12) division at the national championships and set national age groups records for the 300, 400, 500, 600 and 800 meter races. She went on to win her age division at the North American championships that year. In 2006, Todd underwent a successful surgery to overcome compartment syndrome in both shins and continue training. She made the United States Junior World team three times from 2008 to 2010, and her first senior World Cup team in 2010. Todd attended the 2010 Olympic trials, placing 11th in the 500 meters, 11th in the 1000 meters, and 13th in the 5000 meters. At the 2011 National championships, she placed eighth in the 500 meters and ninth in the 1000 meters.

In 2012, Todd relocated to Salt Lake City, Utah, to train with the national team. At the 2012 national championships, she placed fifth in the 500 meters and fifth in the 1000 meters. She qualified for the 2012–13 World Cup team, finishing 36th overall in the 500 meters and 44th in the 1000 meters. Todd attended the 2012–2013 World Sprint Championships, calling it the most memorable event of her career to date. At the 2013 national championships, she placed fourth in the 500 meters, third in the 1000 meters, and fourth in the 1500 meters.

At the 2014 Olympic trials, Todd completed the 500 meters with a combined time of 76.42s in two heats (38.18s and 38.24s). Her time was good enough for fourth place and a spot on the Olympic team. "I feel so good right now. It's amazing. I am so happy. It's immeasurable joy", she remarked after making the Olympic team. The following day, Todd turned in a personal best in the 1000 meters en route to a third-place finish and second Olympic berth. "Knowing I had already secured a spot in the 500 made today that much easier", she commented. She concluded the trials by finishing fourth in the 1500 meters with a personal best time of 1:58.59.

After making the Olympic team, Todd realized her parents could not afford to make the trip to Sochi, Russia, the site of the Olympic games. She started a GoFundMe campaign to raise funds for her parents' travel expenses.

At the 2014 Winter Olympics, Todd placed 29th in the 500 meters with a combined time of 78.53 from two runs. However, she called the race the "most fun I've ever had" and photos of her celebrating after the race caused a Twitter sensation.c Todd specializes in sprint events, listing the 500 meter start as her greatest strength. She is coached by Ryan Shimabukuro.

Todd participated in the US Olympic Trials in January, 2018, but did not qualify for the 2018 Winter Olympics after finishing 4th in the 500m. In a Tweet, she announced, "I may not be going out on top, but I am going out with a smile."

== Personal life ==
As of 2014, Todd lives in Park City, Utah, with fellow speed skaters Brittany Bowe and Heather Richardson-Bergsma. Her parents have retired to Northeastern Texas where they have a farm. In addition to speed skating, Todd has competed in track cycling. In her free time, she enjoys camping, cooking, and visiting the library to find a new book to read. She lists her parents as her greatest influence in life. Her sporting hero is Tucker Fredricks.

== Personal records ==
Personal records
Women's speed skating
Event	Result	Date	Location	Notes
500 m	37.63	November 20, 2015	Utah Olympic Oval, Salt Lake City	
1000 m	1:15.69	October 18, 2015	Utah Olympic Oval, Salt Lake City	
1500 m	1:58.59	December 31, 2013	Utah Olympic Oval, Salt Lake City	
3000 m	4:30.98	November 27, 2005	Olympic Oval, Calgary	
