= Yvonne Daldossi =

Italian speed skater (born 1992)

Personal information
- Born: 26 January 1992 (age 34) Merano, Italy
- Height: 1.64 m (5 ft 5 in)
- Weight: 64 kg (141 lb)

Sport
- Country: Italy
- Sport: Speed skating

Yvonne Daldossi (born 26 January 1992) is an Italian speed skater. She was born in Merano. She competed at the 2013 World Sprint Speed Skating Championships, and at the 2014 Winter Olympics in Sochi, in 500 meters.
