= Heather McLean =

Canadian speed skater

Personal information
- Born: 4 January 1993 (age 33) Winnipeg, Manitoba, Canada
- Height: 1.64 m (5 ft 5 in)
- Weight: 57 kg (126 lb)

Sport
- Country: Canada
- Sport: Speed skating
Medal record
World Single Distances Championships
Silver medal – second place	2019 Inzell	Team sprint

Heather McLean (born January 4, 1993) is a Canadian speed skater who is specialized in the sprint distances.

== Career ==
McLean won her first World Cup medal in November 2015 at the World Cup stop in Calgary when she finished third in the women's team sprint event. In December, she won her first medal in a singles event when she finished third in the women's 500 m event in Inzell. She is coached by Kevin Crockett.

=== 2018 Winter Olympics ===
McLean qualified to compete for Canada at the 2018 Winter Olympics.

== Personal records ==
Personal records
Women's speed skating
Event	Result	Date	Location	Notes
500 m	37.34	5 January 2016	Olympic Oval, Calgary	
1000 m	1:15.63	5 January 2016	Olympic Oval, Calgary	
1500 m	2:01.04	2 January 2014	Olympic Oval, Calgary	
3000 m	4:31.69	16 February 2013	Olympic Oval, Calgary	
