= Sørmarka Arena =

Indoor multi-purpose ice rink in Stavanger, Norway

Coordinates: 58°56′22″N 5°43′16″E

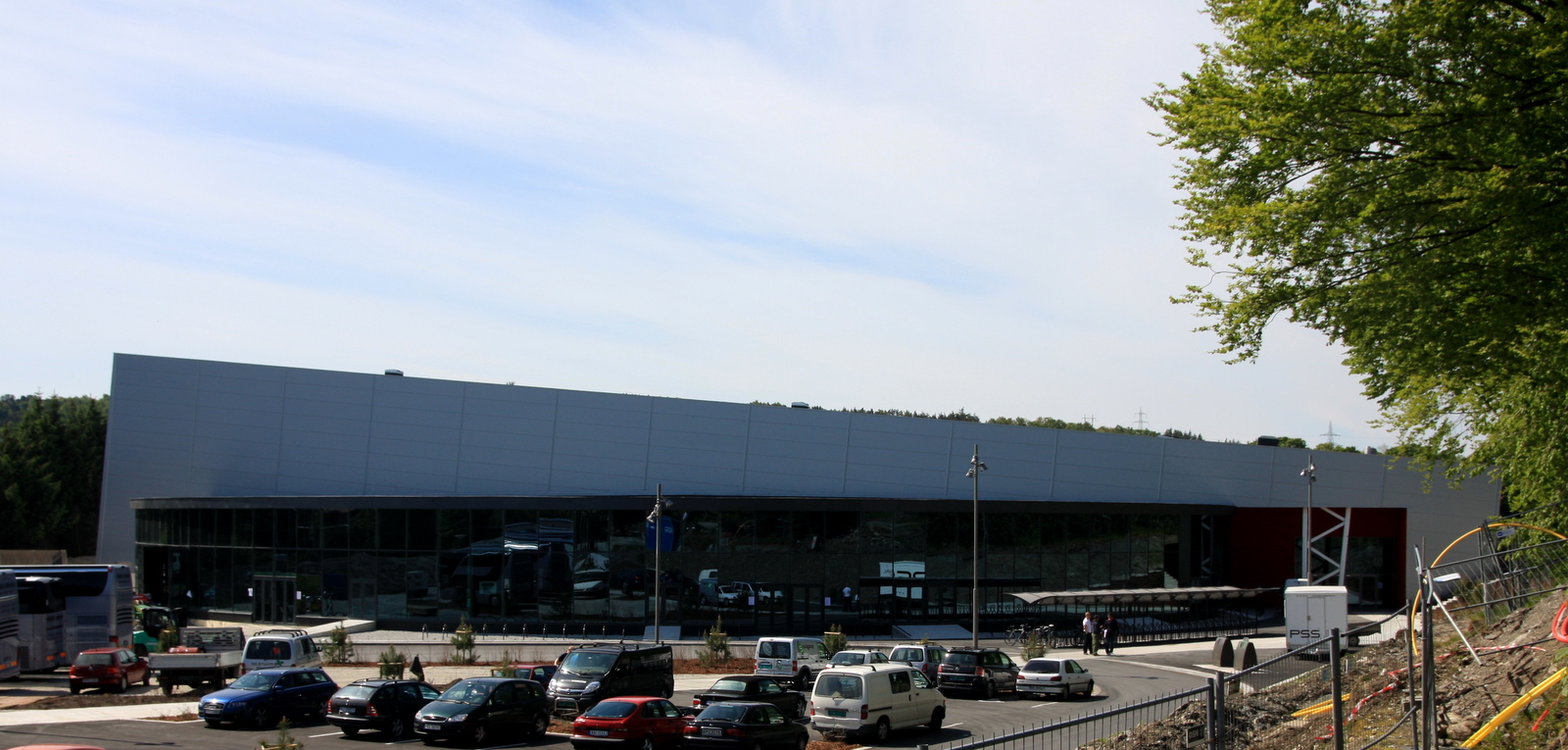
- Interactive map of Sørmarka Arena
- Location: Stavanger, Norway
- Capacity: 4,000

Construction
- Opened: 2010

Sørmarka Arena is an indoor multi-purpose ice rink located in Stavanger, Norway. It consists of a 400-meter speed skating rink, an ice hockey rink, six curling rinks, and a "penguin rink" for newbeginners. There is also a 17-meter (56 ft) tall climbing wall. It can seat 4,000 spectators.

The venue was not designed to host concerts, but on 6 June 2010 a Whitney Houston concert was held with 13,000 spectators. It was not possible to place the stage on the short end, and instead it had to be placed on the long end, making seating difficult.

== See also ==
- List of indoor arenas in Norway
- List of indoor ice rinks in Norway
