= 2015–16 ISU Speed Skating World Cup – World Cup 2 =

The second competition weekend of the 2015–16 ISU Speed Skating World Cup was held in the Utah Olympic Oval in Salt Lake City, United States, from Friday, November 20, until Sunday, November 22, 2015.

There were six world records over the course of the weekend. On Friday, Pavel Kulizhnikov of Russia shaved another 2/100 off his 500 m world record from the previous weekend. On Saturday, Ted-Jan Bloemen of Canada unexpectedly beat Dutchman Sven Kramer's 10000 m world record from 2007 with more than five seconds, and American Heather Richardson-Bergsma beat compatriot Brittany Bowe's 1500 m world record from the weekend before.

On Sunday, Bowe responded by taking back her 1000 m world record, which she had lost to Richardson the previous weekend. Additionally, both the men's and the women's team sprint records, established only the weekend before, were beaten.

Multiple winners were Kulizhnikov, who won both 500 m races and the 1000 m race, and Zhang Hong of China, who won both women's 500 m races and the team sprint.

== Schedule ==
The detailed schedule of events:

Date	Session	Events	Comment
Friday, November 20	Morning	09:00: 5000 m women 10:23: 500 m women (1); 11:04: 500 m men (1)	Division B
Friday, November 20	Afternoon	13:00: 5000 m women 14:10: 500 m women (1); 14:35: 500 m men (1); 15:15: 1500 m men	Division A
Friday, November 20	Afternoon	16:52: 1500 m men	Division B
Saturday, November 21	Morning	09:00: 500 m women (2); 09:26: 1000 m men 10:48: 1500 m women	Division B
Saturday, November 21	Afternoon	13:00: 10000 m men 15:06: 500 m women (2); 15:31: 1000 m men 16:16: 1500 m women	Division A
Saturday, November 21	Afternoon	17:53: 10000 m men	Division B
Sunday, November 22	Morning	09:00: 1000 m women 09:50: 500 m men (2); 10:43: Mass start women 11:13: Mass start men	Division B
Sunday, November 22	Afternoon	13:00: 1000 m women 13:35: 500 m men (2); 14:15: Mass start women 14:45: Mass start men	Division A
Sunday, November 22	Afternoon	15:30: Team sprint women 15:47: Team sprint men	

All times are MST (UTC−7).

== Medal summary ==
=== Men's events ===
Event	Race #	Gold	Time	Silver	Time	Bronze	Time	Report
500 m	1	Pavel Kulizhnikov; Russia	33.98; WR	Mitchell Whitmore; United States	34.19	William Dutton; Canada	34.35	
500 m	2	Pavel Kulizhnikov; Russia	34.13	William Dutton; Canada	34.34	Laurent Dubreuil; Canada	34.36	
1000 m		Pavel Kulizhnikov; Russia	1:06.70	Kjeld Nuis; Netherlands	1:07.02	Gerben Jorritsma; Netherlands	1:07.23	
1500 m		Kjeld Nuis; Netherlands	1:42.18	Joey Mantia; United States	1:42.45	Shani Davis; United States	1:42.90	
10000 m		Ted-Jan Bloemen; Canada	12:36.30; WR	Sven Kramer; Netherlands	12:44.26	Jorrit Bergsma; Netherlands	12:53.99	
Mass start		Arjan Stroetinga; Netherlands	60 ^{A}	Fabio Francolini; Italy	41 ^{A}	Bart Swings; Belgium	21 ^{A}	
Team sprint		Canada; William Dutton; Alexandre St-Jean; Vincent De Haître	1:17.75; WR	Russia; Kirill Golubev; Artyom Kuznetsov; Aleksey Yesin	1:19.12	Netherlands; Hein Otterspeer; Kai Verbij; Stefan Groothuis	1:19.20	

^{A} In mass start, race points are accumulated during the race. The skater with most race points is the winner.

=== Women's events ===
Event	Race #	Gold	Time	Silver	Time	Bronze	Time	Report
500 m	1	Zhang Hong; China	36.56	Brittany Bowe; United States	37.03	Heather Richardson-Bergsma; United States	37.13	
500 m	2	Zhang Hong; China	36.82	Lee Sang-hwa; South Korea	36.83	Brittany Bowe; United States	37.08	
1000 m		Brittany Bowe; United States	1:12.18; WR	Zhang Hong; China	1:12.77	Heather Richardson-Bergsma; United States	1:13.45	
1500 m		Heather Richardson-Bergsma; United States	1:50.85; WR	Brittany Bowe; United States	1:51.31	Martina Sáblíková; Czech Republic	1:53.44	
5000 m		Martina Sáblíková; Czech Republic	6:47.42	Natalya Voronina; Russia	6:53.16	Ivanie Blondin; Canada	6:55.88	
Mass start		Irene Schouten; Netherlands	60 ^{A}	Ivanie Blondin; Canada	40 ^{A}	Misaki Oshigiri; Japan	20 ^{A}	
Team sprint		China; Yu Jing; Zhang Hong; Li Qishi	1:24.65; WR	Russia; Yekaterina Shikhova; Nadezhda Aseyeva; Olga Fatkulina	1:26.07	Japan; Erina Kamiya; Maki Tsuji; Nao Kodaira	1:26.62	

^{A} In mass start, race points are accumulated during the race. The skater with most race points is the winner.

== Standings ==
The top ten standings in the contested cups after the weekend. The top five nations in the team sprint cups.

=== Men's cups ===
500 m

#	Name	Nat.	CGY1	CGY2	SLC1	SLC2	Total
1	Pavel Kulizhnikov	(Russia)	100	100	100	100	400
2	William Dutton	(Canada)	70	80	70	80	300
3	Mika Poutala	(Finland)	80	36	36	60	212
4	Mitchell Whitmore	(United States)	15	50	80	24	169
5	Laurent Dubreuil	(Canada)	36	45	14	70	165
6	Ronald Mulder	(Netherlands)	60	40	50	14	164
7	Alex Boisvert-Lacroix	(Canada)	25	70	40	28	163
8	Gilmore Junio	(Canada)	19	60	28	18	125
9	Joji Kato	(Japan)	12	28	32	45	117
10	Artur Waś	(Poland)	40	12	8	50	110

1000 m

#	Name	Nat.	CGY	SLC	Total
1	Pavel Kulizhnikov	(Russia)	80	100	180
2	Gerben Jorritsma	(Netherlands)	100	70	170
3	Kjeld Nuis	(Netherlands)	70	80	150
4	Shani Davis	(United States)	50	60	110
5	Joey Mantia	(United States)	60	40	100
6	Vincent De Haître	(Canada)	36	50	86
7	Kai Verbij	(Netherlands)	40	45	85
8	Aleksey Yesin	(Russia)	45	32	77
9	Mika Poutala	(Finland)	25	36	61
10	Thomas Krol	(Netherlands)	18	28	46

1500 m

#	Name	Nat.	CGY	SLC	Total
1	Kjeld Nuis	(Netherlands)	60	100	160
2	Joey Mantia	(United States)	70	80	150
3	Bart Swings	(Belgium)	80	50	130
4	Shani Davis	(United States)	36	70	106
5	Sverre Lunde Pedersen	(Norway)	40	60	100
5	Denis Yuskov	(Russia)	100		100
7	Thomas Krol	(Netherlands)	45	28	73
8	Gerben Jorritsma	(Netherlands)	32	36	68
8	Li Bailin	(China)	28	40	68
10	Håvard Bøkko	(Norway)	21	45	66

5000/10000 m

#	Name	Nat.	CGY	SLC	Total
1	Sven Kramer	(Netherlands)	100	80	180
2	Ted-Jan Bloemen	(Canada)	70	100	170
3	Jorrit Bergsma	(Netherlands)	80	70	150
4	Patrick Beckert	(Germany)	60	60	120
5	Bart Swings	(Belgium)	50	50	100
6	Peter Michael	(New Zealand)	32	45	77
7	Erik Jan Kooiman	(Netherlands)	35	40	75
8	Sverre Lunde Pedersen	(Norway)	40	25	65
9	Andrea Giovannini	(Italy)	25	35	60
10	Jordan Belchos	(Canada)	27	30	57

Mass start

#	Name	Nat.	CGY	SLC	Total
1	Bart Swings	(Belgium)	100	70	170
2	Arjan Stroetinga	(Netherlands)	50	100	150
3	Jorrit Bergsma	(Netherlands)	80	40	120
4	Fabio Francolini	(Italy)	28	80	108
5	Reyon Kay	(New Zealand)	70	16	86
6	Viktor Hald Thorup	(Denmark)	25	50	75
7	Peter Michael	(New Zealand)	40	32	72
7	Sun Longjiang	(China)	36	36	72
9	Kim Cheol-min	(South Korea)	19	45	64
10	Livio Wenger	(Switzerland)	60	2	62

Team sprint

#	Country	CGY	SLC	Total
1	Netherlands	100	70	170
2	Russia	70	80	150
3	United States	80	45	125
4	Canada		100	100
5	Poland	45	40	85

Grand World Cup

#	Name	Nat.	CGY	SLC	Total
1	Bart Swings	(Belgium)	230	170	400
2	Pavel Kulizhnikov	(Russia)	180	200	380
3	Kjeld Nuis	(Netherlands)	130	180	310
4	Jorrit Bergsma	(Netherlands)	160	70	230
5	Joey Mantia	(United States)	130	80	210
6	Shani Davis	(United States)	50	130	180
6	Sven Kramer	(Netherlands)	100	80	180
8	Ted-Jan Bloemen	(Canada)	70	100	170
9	Gerben Jorritsma	(Netherlands)	100	70	170
10	William Dutton	(Canada)	75	75	150
10	Arjan Stroetinga	(Netherlands)	50	100	150

=== Women's cups ===
500 m

#	Name	Nat.	CGY1	CGY2	SLC1	SLC2	Total
1	Zhang Hong	(China)	80	100	100	100	380
2	Lee Sang-hwa	(South Korea)	100	80	60	80	320
3	Brittany Bowe	(United States)	70	60	80	70	280
4	Heather Richardson-Bergsma	(United States)	60	70	70	60	260
5	Yu Jing	(China)	45	50	50	50	195
6	Vanessa Bittner	(Austria)	50	36	45	21	152
7	Maki Tsuji	(Japan)	40	32	28	36	136
8	Erina Kamiya	(Japan)	36	40	21	28	125
9	Olga Fatkulina	(Russia)	28	21	32	40	121
10	Heather McLean	(Canada)	19	28	16	45	108

1000 m

#	Name	Nat.	CGY	SLC	Total
1	Brittany Bowe	(United States)	80	100	180
2	Heather Richardson-Bergsma	(United States)	100	70	170
3	Zhang Hong	(China)	70	80	150
4	Marrit Leenstra	(Netherlands)	45	60	105
5	Vanessa Bittner	(Austria)	50	40	90
6	Li Qishi	(China)	25	50	75
7	Olga Fatkulina	(Russia)	24	45	69
8	Margot Boer	(Netherlands)	32	32	64
9	Jorien ter Mors	(Netherlands)	60		60
10	Karolína Erbanová	(Czech Republic)	36	21	57

1500 m

#	Name	Nat.	CGY	SLC	Total
1	Brittany Bowe	(United States)	100	80	180
1	Heather Richardson-Bergsma	(United States)	80	100	180
3	Martina Sáblíková	(Czech Republic)	70	70	140
4	Marrit Leenstra	(Netherlands)	50	60	110
4	Ida Njåtun	(Norway)	60	50	110
6	Marije Joling	(Netherlands)	45	28	73
6	Misaki Oshigiri	(Japan)	28	45	73
8	Antoinette de Jong	(Netherlands)	36	36	72
9	Ayaka Kikuchi	(Japan)	21	40	61
9	Li Qishi	(China)	40	21	61

3000/5000 m

#	Name	Nat.	CGY	SLC	Total
1	Martina Sáblíková	(Czech Republic)	100	100	200
2	Natalya Voronina	(Russia)	70	80	150
3	Irene Schouten	(Netherlands)	80	50	130
4	Ivanie Blondin	(Canada)	40	70	110
5	Claudia Pechstein	(Germany)	35	60	95
6	Misaki Oshigiri	(Japan)	32	45	77
7	Olga Graf	(Russia)	30	40	70
8	Jorien Voorhuis	(Netherlands)	60		60
9	Miho Takagi	(Japan)	23	35	58
10	Yvonne Nauta	(Netherlands)	12	30	51

Mass start

#	Name	Nat.	CGY	SLC	Total
1	Irene Schouten	(Netherlands)	80	100	180
2	Ivanie Blondin	(Canada)	70	80	150
3	Kim Bo-reum	(South Korea)	100	5	105
4	Misaki Oshigiri	(Japan)	25	70	95
5	Janneke Ensing	(Netherlands)	32	60	92
6	Heather Richardson-Bergsma	(United States)	50	28	78
7	Luiza Złotkowska	(Poland)	11	50	61
8	Martina Sáblíková	(Czech Republic)	60		60
9	Park Do-yeong	(South Korea)	40	19	59
10	Hao Jiachen	(Japan)	21	36	57

Team sprint

#	Country	CGY	SLC	Total
1	China	80	100	180
2	Japan	100	70	170
3	Canada	70	60	130
4	Netherlands	60	50	110
5	Belarus	50	40	90

Grand World Cup

#	Name	Nat.	CGY	SLC	Total
1	Heather Richardson-Bergsma	(United States)	295	235	530
2	Brittany Bowe	(United States)	245	255	500
3	Martina Sáblíková	(Czech Republic)	230	170	400
4	Zhang Hong	(China)	160	180	340
5	Irene Schouten	(Netherlands)	160	150	310
6	Ivanie Blondin	(Canada)	70	150	220
7	Marrit Leenstra	(Netherlands)	50	120	170
8	Lee Sang-hwa	(South Korea)	90	70	160
9	Natalya Voronina	(Russia)	70	80	150
10	Ida Njåtun	(Norway)	60	50	110
