= 2015–16 ISU Speed Skating World Cup – World Cup 3 =

The third competition weekend of the 2015–16 ISU Speed Skating World Cup was held in Eisstadion Inzell in Inzell, Germany, from Friday, 4 December, until Sunday, 6 December 2015.

There were no world records over the weekend. Multiple winners were Lee Sang-hwa of South Korea, who won both women's 500 m races, and Brittany Bowe of the United States, who won the women's 1000 and 1500 m races.

== Schedule ==
The detailed schedule of events:

| Date | Session | Events | Comment |
|---|---|---|---|
| Friday, 4 December | Afternoon | 12:00: 500 m women (1); 12:20: 500 m men (1); 13:10: 3000 m women | Division B |
| Friday, 4 December | Evening | 16:00: 3000 m women 17:04: 500 m women (1); 17:29: 500 m men (1) | Division A |
| Friday, 4 December | Evening | 18:19: Team pursuit men | |
| Saturday, 5 December | Morning | 09:30: 1000 m men 10:35: 1000 m women 11:23: 5000 m men | Division B |
| Saturday, 5 December | Afternoon | 14:00: 1000 m men 14:30: 1000 m women 15:15: 5000 m men | Division A |
| Saturday, 5 December | Afternoon | 16:47: Team pursuit women | |
| Sunday, 6 December | Morning | 09:45: 500 m women (2); 09:59: 500 m men (2); 10:45: 1500 m women 11:41: 1500 m men | Division B |
| Sunday, 6 December | Afternoon | 14:00: 1500 m women 14:53: 1500 m men 15:43: 500 m women (2); 16:08: 500 m men (2); 16:48: Mass start women 17:17: Mass start men | Division A |
| Sunday, 6 December | Evening | 18:07: Mass start women 18:39: Mass start men | Division B |

All times are CET (UTC+1).

== Medal summary ==
=== Men's events ===
| Event | Race # | Gold | Time | Silver | Time | Bronze | Time | Report |
|---|---|---|---|---|---|---|---|---|
| 500 m | 1 | Gilmore Junio; Canada | 34.86 | Alexandre St-Jean; Canada | 34.90 | Artur Waś; Poland | 34.97 | |
| 500 m | 2 | Artur Waś; Poland | 34.65 | Alex Boisvert-Lacroix; Canada | 34.74 | Kai Verbij; Netherlands | 34.80 | |
| 1000 m | | Kjeld Nuis; Netherlands | 1:08:31 | Denis Yuskov; Russia | 1:08:55 | Kai Verbij; Netherlands | 1:08.60 | |
| 1500 m | | Denis Yuskov; Russia | 1:44:21 | Kjeld Nuis; Netherlands | 1:45:20 | Joey Mantia; United States | 1:45.25 | |
| 5000 m | | Jorrit Bergsma; Netherlands | 6:17.35 | Sverre Lunde Pedersen; Norway | 6:19.52 | Arjan Stroetinga; Netherlands | 6:21.66 | |
| Mass start | | Alexis Contin; France | 60 ^{A} | Jorrit Bergsma; Netherlands | 48 ^{A} | Fabio Francolini; Italy | 22 ^{A} | |
| Team pursuit | | Netherlands; Jan Blokhuijsen; Douwe de Vries; Arjan Stroetinga | 3:41.27 | Norway; Sverre Lunde Pedersen; Håvard Bøkko; Sindre Henriksen | 3:44.88 | Poland; Jan Szymański; Konrad Niedźwiedzki; Zbigniew Bródka | 3:46.17 | |

^{A} In mass start, race points are accumulated during the race. The skater with most race points is the winner.

=== Women's events ===
| Event | Race # | Gold | Time | Silver | Time | Bronze | Time | Report |
|---|---|---|---|---|---|---|---|---|
| 500 m | 1 | Lee Sang-hwa; South Korea | 37.33 | Brittany Bowe; United States | 37.70 | Heather Richardson-Bergsma; United States | 37.99 | |
| 500 m | 2 | Lee Sang-hwa; South Korea | 37.36 | Heather Richardson-Bergsma; United States | 37.84 | Heather McLean; Canada | 38.02 | |
| 1000 m | | Brittany Bowe; United States | 1:14.01 | Heather Richardson-Bergsma; United States | 1:14.52 | Lee Sang-hwa; South Korea | 1:15.27 | |
| 1500 m | | Brittany Bowe; United States | 1:54.68 | Heather Richardson-Bergsma; United States | 1:54.94 | Marrit Leenstra; Netherlands | 1:55.79 | |
| 3000 m | | Martina Sáblíková; Czech Republic | 4:03.18 | Marije Joling; Netherlands | 4:04.08 | Olga Graf; Russia | 4:05.87 | |
| Mass start | | Irene Schouten; Netherlands | 60 ^{A} | Ivanie Blondin; Canada | 40 ^{A} | Park Do-yeong; South Korea | 20 ^{A} | |
| Team pursuit | | Japan; Miho Takagi; Nana Takagi; Misaki Oshigiri | 2:59.08 | Netherlands; Marrit Leenstra; Antoinette de Jong; Marije Joling | 2:59.69 | Russia; Natalya Voronina; Olga Graf; Elizaveta Kazelina | 3:00.36 | |

^{A} In mass start, race points are accumulated during the race. The skater with most race points is the winner.

== Standings ==
The top ten standings in the contested cups after the weekend. The top five nations in the team pursuit cups.

=== Men's cups ===
500 m

| # | Name | Nat. | CGY1 | CGY2 | SLC1 | SLC2 | INZ1 | INZ2 | Total |
|---|---|---|---|---|---|---|---|---|---|
| 1 | Pavel Kulizhnikov | (Russia) | 100 | 100 | 100 | 100 | | | 400 |
| 2 | William Dutton | (Canada) | 70 | 80 | 70 | 80 | 8 | 16 | 324 |
| 3 | Gilmore Junio | (Canada) | 19 | 60 | 28 | 18 | 100 | 60 | 285 |
| 4 | Artur Waś | (Poland) | 40 | 12 | 8 | 50 | 70 | 100 | 280 |
| 5 | Alex Boisvert-Lacroix | (Canada) | 25 | 70 | 40 | 28 | 32 | 80 | 275 |
| 6 | Mika Poutala | (Finland) | 80 | 36 | 36 | 60 | | 50 | 262 |
| 7 | Laurent Dubreuil | (Canada) | 36 | 45 | 14 | 70 | 60 | 32 | 257 |
| 8 | Kai Verbij | (Netherlands) | 16 | 21 | 60 | 12 | 16 | 70 | 195 |
| 9 | Alexandre St-Jean | (Canada) | 11 | 6 | 25 | 36 | 80 | 12 | 170 |
| 10 | Mitchell Whitmore | (United States) | 15 | 50 | 80 | 24 | | | 169 |

1000 m

| # | Name | Nat. | CGY | SLC | INZ | Total |
|---|---|---|---|---|---|---|
| 1 | Kjeld Nuis | (Netherlands) | 70 | 80 | 100 | 250 |
| 2 | Gerben Jorritsma | (Netherlands) | 100 | 70 | 28 | 198 |
| 3 | Pavel Kulizhnikov | (Russia) | 80 | 100 | | 180 |
| 4 | Joey Mantia | (United States) | 60 | 40 | 60 | 160 |
| 5 | Kai Verbij | (Netherlands) | 40 | 45 | 70 | 155 |
| 6 | Shani Davis | (United States) | 50 | 60 | 24 | 134 |
| 7 | Aleksey Yesin | (Russia) | 45 | 32 | 45 | 122 |
| 8 | Vincent De Haître | (Canada) | 36 | 50 | 21 | 107 |
| 9 | Denis Yuskov | (Russia) | | 25 | 80 | 105 |
| 10 | Thomas Krol | (Netherlands) | 18 | 28 | 50 | 96 |

1500 m

| # | Name | Nat. | CGY | SLC | INZ | Total |
|---|---|---|---|---|---|---|
| 1 | Kjeld Nuis | (Netherlands) | 60 | 100 | 80 | 240 |
| 2 | Joey Mantia | (United States) | 70 | 80 | 70 | 220 |
| 3 | Denis Yuskov | (Russia) | 100 | | 100 | 200 |
| 4 | Thomas Krol | (Netherlands) | 45 | 28 | 60 | 133 |
| 5 | Sverre Lunde Pedersen | (Norway) | 40 | 60 | 32 | 132 |
| 6 | Bart Swings | (Belgium) | 80 | 50 | | 130 |
| 7 | Shani Davis | (United States) | 36 | 70 | 18 | 124 |
| 8 | Konrad Niedźwiedzki | (Poland) | 50 | 12 | 50 | 112 |
| 9 | Håvard Bøkko | (Norway) | 21 | 45 | 40 | 106 |
| 10 | Gerben Jorritsma | (Netherlands) | 32 | 36 | 36 | 104 |

5k/10k

| # | Name | Nat. | CGY | SLC | INZ | Total |
|---|---|---|---|---|---|---|
| 1 | Jorrit Bergsma | (Netherlands) | 80 | 70 | 100 | 250 |
| 2 | Sven Kramer | (Netherlands) | 100 | 80 | | 180 |
| 3 | Ted-Jan Bloemen | (Canada) | 70 | 100 | | 170 |
| 4 | Patrick Beckert | (Germany) | 60 | 60 | 40 | 160 |
| 5 | Sverre Lunde Pedersen | (Norway) | 40 | 25 | 80 | 145 |
| 6 | Peter Michael | (New Zealand) | 32 | 45 | 50 | 127 |
| 7 | Erik Jan Kooiman | (Netherlands) | 35 | 40 | 45 | 120 |
| 8 | Douwe de Vries | (Netherlands) | 45 | | 60 | 105 |
| 9 | Bart Swings | (Belgium) | 50 | 50 | | 100 |
| 10 | Arjan Stroetinga | (Canada) | | 27 | 70 | 97 |

Mass start

| # | Name | Nat. | CGY | SLC | INZ | Total |
|---|---|---|---|---|---|---|
| 1 | Jorrit Bergsma | (Netherlands) | 80 | 40 | 80 | 200 |
| 1 | Arjan Stroetinga | (Netherlands) | 50 | 100 | 50 | 200 |
| 3 | Fabio Francolini | (Italy) | 28 | 80 | 70 | 178 |
| 4 | Bart Swings | (Belgium) | 100 | 70 | | 170 |
| 5 | Alexis Contin | (France) | | 60 | 100 | 160 |
| 6 | Reyon Kay | (New Zealand) | 70 | 16 | 40 | 126 |
| 7 | Peter Michael | (New Zealand) | 40 | 32 | 28 | 100 |
| 8 | Viktor Hald Thorup | (Denmark) | 25 | 50 | 14 | 89 |
| 9 | Kim Cheol-min | (South Korea) | 19 | 45 | 24 | 88 |
| 10 | Haralds Silovs | (Latvia) | 4 | 19 | 60 | 83 |

Team pursuit

| # | Country | CGY | INZ | Total |
|---|---|---|---|---|
| 1 | South Korea | 80 | 60 | 140 |
| 2 | Poland | 60 | 70 | 130 |
| 3 | Italy | 70 | 50 | 120 |
| 4 | Canada | 100 | | 100 |
| 4 | Netherlands | | 100 | 100 |

Grand World Cup

| # | Name | Nat. | CGY | SLC | INZ | Total |
|---|---|---|---|---|---|---|
| 1 | Kjeld Nuis | (Netherlands) | 130 | 180 | 180 | 490 |
| 2 | Jorrit Bergsma | (Netherlands) | 160 | 70 | 180 | 410 |
| 3 | Bart Swings | (Belgium) | 230 | 170 | | 400 |
| 4 | Pavel Kulizhnikov | (Russia) | 180 | 200 | | 380 |
| 5 | Joey Mantia | (United States) | 130 | 80 | 130 | 340 |
| 6 | Dennis Yuskov | (Russia) | 100 | | 180 | 280 |
| 7 | Arjan Stroetinga | (Netherlands) | 50 | 100 | 120 | 270 |
| 8 | Shani Davis | (United States) | 50 | 130 | | 180 |
| 8 | Sven Kramer | (Netherlands) | 100 | 80 | | 180 |
| 10 | Ted-Jan Bloemen | (Canada) | 70 | 100 | | 170 |
| 10 | Gerben Jorritsma | (Netherlands) | 100 | 70 | | 170 |

=== Women's cups ===
500 m

| # | Name | Nat. | CGY1 | CGY2 | SLC1 | SLC2 | INZ1 | INZ2 | Total |
|---|---|---|---|---|---|---|---|---|---|
| 1 | Lee Sang-hwa | (South Korea) | 100 | 80 | 60 | 80 | 100 | 100 | 520 |
| 2 | Heather Richardson-Bergsma | (United States) | 60 | 70 | 70 | 60 | 70 | 80 | 410 |
| 3 | Zhang Hong | (China) | 80 | 100 | 100 | 100 | | | 380 |
| 4 | Brittany Bowe | (United States) | 70 | 60 | 80 | 70 | 80 | | 360 |
| 5 | Vanessa Bittner | (Austria) | 50 | 36 | 45 | 21 | 50 | 50 | 252 |
| 6 | Heather McLean | (Canada) | 19 | 28 | 16 | 45 | 60 | 70 | 238 |
| 7 | Erina Kamiya | (Japan) | 36 | 40 | 21 | 28 | 36 | 60 | 221 |
| 8 | Maki Tsuji | (Japan) | 40 | 32 | 28 | 36 | 24 | 36 | 196 |
| 9 | Yu Jing | (China) | 45 | 50 | 50 | 50 | | | 195 |
| 10 | Olga Fatkulina | (Russia) | 28 | 21 | 32 | 40 | 45 | 18 | 184 |

1000 m

| # | Name | Nat. | CGY | SLC | INZ | Total |
|---|---|---|---|---|---|---|
| 1 | Brittany Bowe | (United States) | 80 | 100 | 100 | 280 |
| 2 | Heather Richardson-Bergsma | (United States) | 100 | 70 | 80 | 250 |
| 3 | Marrit Leenstra | (Netherlands) | 45 | 60 | 50 | 155 |
| 4 | Zhang Hong | (China) | 70 | 80 | | 150 |
| 5 | Li Qishi | (China) | 25 | 50 | 60 | 135 |
| 6 | Vanessa Bittner | (Austria) | 50 | 40 | 40 | 130 |
| 7 | Lee Sang-hwa | (South Korea) | 28 | | 70 | 98 |
| 8 | Olga Fatkulina | (Russia) | 24 | 45 | 28 | 97 |
| 9 | Ida Njåtun | (Norway) | 40 | 8 | 45 | 93 |
| 10 | Margot Boer | (Netherlands) | 32 | 32 | 16 | 80 |

1500 m

| # | Name | Nat. | CGY | SLC | INZ | Total |
|---|---|---|---|---|---|---|
| 1 | Brittany Bowe | (United States) | 100 | 80 | 100 | 280 |
| 2 | Heather Richardson-Bergsma | (United States) | 80 | 100 | 80 | 260 |
| 3 | Martina Sáblíková | (Czech Republic) | 70 | 70 | 50 | 190 |
| 4 | Marrit Leenstra | (Netherlands) | 50 | 60 | 70 | 180 |
| 5 | Ida Njåtun | (Norway) | 60 | 50 | 60 | 170 |
| 6 | Marije Joling | (Netherlands) | 45 | 28 | 40 | 113 |
| 7 | Miho Takagi | (Japan) | 25 | 32 | 45 | 102 |
| 8 | Misaki Oshigiri | (Japan) | 28 | 45 | 28 | 101 |
| 9 | Ayaka Kikuchi | (Japan) | 21 | 40 | 36 | 97 |
| 10 | Antoinette de Jong | (Netherlands) | 36 | 36 | 18 | 90 |

3k/5k

| # | Name | Nat. | CGY | SLC | INZ | Total |
|---|---|---|---|---|---|---|
| 1 | Martina Sáblíková | (Czech Republic) | 100 | 100 | 100 | 300 |
| 2 | Natalya Voronina | (Russia) | 70 | 80 | 50 | 200 |
| 3 | Irene Schouten | (Netherlands) | 80 | 50 | 25 | 155 |
| 4 | Ivanie Blondin | (Canada) | 40 | 70 | 30 | 140 |
| 4 | Olga Graf | (Russia) | 30 | 40 | 70 | 140 |
| 6 | Claudia Pechstein | (Germany) | 35 | 60 | 35 | 130 |
| 7 | Marije Joling | (Netherlands) | 45 | | 80 | 125 |
| 8 | Jorien Voorhuis | (Netherlands) | 60 | | 60 | 120 |
| 9 | Miho Takagi | (Japan) | 23 | 35 | 40 | 98 |
| 10 | Yvonne Nauta | (Netherlands) | 12 | 30 | 45 | 96 |

Mass start

| # | Name | Nat. | CGY | SLC | INZ | Total |
|---|---|---|---|---|---|---|
| 1 | Irene Schouten | (Netherlands) | 80 | 100 | 100 | 280 |
| 2 | Ivanie Blondin | (Canada) | 70 | 80 | 80 | 230 |
| 3 | Janneke Ensing | (Netherlands) | 32 | 60 | 40 | 132 |
| 4 | Park Do-yeong | (South Korea) | 40 | 19 | 70 | 129 |
| 5 | Heather Richardson-Bergsma | (United States) | 50 | 28 | 45 | 123 |
| 6 | Martina Sáblíková | (Czech Republic) | 60 | | 60 | 120 |
| 7 | Kim Bo-reum | (South Korea) | 100 | 5 | | 105 |
| 8 | Liu Jing | (China) | 14 | 40 | 50 | 104 |
| 9 | Misaki Oshigiri | (Japan) | 25 | 70 | | 95 |
| 10 | Luiza Złotkowska | (Poland) | 11 | 50 | 32 | 93 |

Team pursuit

| # | Country | CGY | INZ | Total |
|---|---|---|---|---|
| 1 | Japan | 80 | 100 | 180 |
| 1 | Netherlands | 100 | 80 | 180 |
| 3 | Russia | 70 | 70 | 140 |
| 4 | Canada | 60 | 45 | 105 |
| 5 | Germany | 45 | 50 | 95 |
| 5 | Poland | 35 | 60 | 95 |

Grand World Cup

| # | Name | Nat. | CGY | SLC | INZ | Total |
|---|---|---|---|---|---|---|
| 1 | Heather Richardson-Bergsma | (United States) | 295 | 235 | 235 | 765 |
| 2 | Brittany Bowe | (United States) | 245 | 255 | 240 | 740 |
| 3 | Martina Sáblíková | (Czech Republic) | 230 | 170 | 210 | 610 |
| 4 | Irene Schouten | (Netherlands) | 160 | 150 | 100 | 410 |
| 5 | Zhang Hong | (China) | 160 | 180 | | 340 |
| 6 | Lee Sang-hwa | (South Korea) | 90 | 70 | 170 | 330 |
| 7 | Ivanie Blondin | (Canada) | 70 | 150 | 80 | 300 |
| 8 | Marrit Leenstra | (Netherlands) | 50 | 120 | 120 | 290 |
| 9 | Natalya Voronina | (Russia) | 70 | 80 | 50 | 200 |
| 10 | Ida Njåtun | (Norway) | 60 | 50 | 60 | 170 |
