= 2015–16 ISU Speed Skating World Cup – Women's 1500 metres =

The 1500 meters distance for women in the 2015–16 ISU Speed Skating World Cup will be contested over six races on six occasions, out of a total of World Cup occasions for the season, with the first occasion taking place in Calgary, Alberta, Canada, on 13–15 November 2015, and the final occasion taking place in Heerenveen, Netherlands, on 11–13 March 2016.

The defending champion is Marrit Leenstra of the Netherlands.

== Top three ==
Position	Athlete	Points	Previous season

== Race medallists ==
WC #	Location	Date	Gold	Time	Silver	Time	Bronze	Time	Report
1	Calgary, Canada	15 November	Brittany Bowe; United States	1:51.59; WR	Heather Richardson-Bergsma; United States	1:52.27	Martina Sáblíková; Czech Republic	1:54.18	
2	Salt Lake City, United States	21 November	Heather Richardson-Bergsma; United States	1:50.85; WR	Brittany Bowe; United States	1:51.31	Martina Sáblíková; Czech Republic	1:53.44	
3	Inzell, Germany	6 December	Brittany Bowe; United States	1:54.68	Heather Richardson-Bergsma; United States	1:54.94	Marrit Leenstra; Netherlands	1:55.27	
4	Heerenveen, Netherlands	13 December	Heather Richardson-Bergsma; United States	1:55.29	Brittany Bowe; United States	1:55.44	Marrit Leenstra; Netherlands	1:56.12	
5	Stavanger, Norway	30 January	Martina Sáblíková; Czech Republic	1:55.44	Brittany Bowe; United States	1:55.47	Marrit Leenstra; Netherlands	1:55.93	
6	Heerenveen, Netherlands	12 March	Brittany Bowe; United States	1:54.34	Heather Richardson-Bergsma; United States	1:54.90	Antoinette de Jong; Netherlands	1:56.32	

== Standings ==
#	Name	Nat.	CGY	SLC	INZ	HVN1	STA	HVN2	Total
1	Brittany Bowe	(United States)	100	80	100	80	80		440
2	Heather Richardson-Bergsma	(United States)	80	100	80	100	21		381
3	Martina Sábliková	(Czech Republic)	70	70	50	60	100		350
4	Marrit Leenstra	(Netherlands)	50	60	70	70	70		320
5	Ida Njåtun	(Norway)	60	50	60	45	24		239
6	Miho Takagi	(Japan)	25	32	45	50	50		202
7	Marije Joling	(Netherlands)	45	28	40	40	32		185
8	Misaki Oshigiri	(Japan)	28	45	28	28	40		169
9	Ayaka Kikuchi	(Japan)	21	40	36	32	36		165
10	Antoinette de Jong	(Netherlands)	36	36	18	36	—		126
11	Sanneke de Neeling	(Netherlands)	32	18	12	24	—		86
12	Natalia Czerwonka	(Poland)	14	10	8	25	28		85
13	Diane Valkenburg	(Netherlands)	18	14	32	18	—		82
14	Li Qishi	(China)	40	21	—	14	—		75
15	Natalya Voronina	(Russia)	24	5	21	8	16		74
16	Yekaterina Shikhova	(Russia)	16	8	24	21	—		69
17	Luiza Złotkowska	(Poland)	8	8	19	16	14		65
18	Elizaveta Kazelina	(Russia)	11	16	14	5	18		64
19	Kali Christ	(Canada)	6	11	25	12	8		62
20	Ireen Wüst	(Netherlands)	—	—	—	—	60		60
21	Hao Jiachen	(China)	19	12	16	6	6		59
22	Nana Takagi	(Japan)	0	19	6	19	10		54
23	Linda de Vries	(Netherlands)	—	—	—	—	45		45
24	Gabriele Hirschbichler	(Germany)	12	6	5	8	12		43
25	Vanessa Bittner	(Austria)	15	24	—	—	—		39
26	Zhao Xin	(China)	10	1	8	15	5		39
27	Margarita Ryzhova	(Russia)	8	—	15	10	—		33
28	Ivanie Blondin	(Canada)	—	25	—	—	6		31
29	Roxanne Dufter	(Germany)	0	15	10	4	—		29
30	Olga Graf	(Russia)	—	2	—	—	25		27
31	Noh Seon-Yeong	(South Korea)	4	6	0	11	—		21
32	Annouk van der Weijden	(Netherlands)	—	—	—	—	19		19
33	Paige Schwartzburg	(United States)	1	0	11	6	0		18
34	Brianne Tutt	(Canada)	0	4	—	2	11		17
35	Yuliya Skokova	(Russia)	—	—	—	—	15		15
36	Hege Bøkko	(Norway)	6	0	2	1	—		9
37	Claudia Pechstein	(Germany)	—	—	—	—	8		8
38	Liu Jing	(China)	0	0	4	0	4		8
39	Katarzyna Woźniak	(Poland)	0	0	6	0	0		6
40	Kim Bo-Reum	(South Korea)	5	0	—	—	—		5
41	Josie Spence	(Canada)	2	—	—	—	2		4
42	Marina Zueva	(Belarus)	0	0	—	0	1		1
43	Francesca Bettrone	(Italy)	0	0	1	0	0		1
