= 2015–16 ISU Speed Skating World Cup – Women's mass start =

The women's mass start in the 2015–16 ISU Speed Skating World Cup will be contested over five races on six occasions, out of a total of World Cup occasions for the season, with the first occasion taking place in Calgary, Alberta, Canada, on 13–15 November 2015, and the final occasion taking place in Heerenveen, Netherlands, on 11–13 March 2016.

The defending champion is Ivanie Blondin of Canada. Blondin finished podium in all five races, but failed to win one. Irene Schouten of the Netherlands won three races and the final classification.

== Top three ==
Position	Athlete	Points	Previous season

== Race medallists ==
WC #	Location	Date	Gold	Race points	Silver	Race points	Bronze	Race points	Report
1	Calgary, Canada	15 November	Kim Bo-reum; South Korea	60	Irene Schouten; Netherlands	41	Ivanie Blondin; Canada	23	
2	Salt Lake City, United States	22 November	Irene Schouten; Netherlands	60	Ivanie Blondin; Canada	40	Misaki Oshigiri; Japan	20	
3	Inzell, Germany	6 December	Irene Schouten; Netherlands	60	Ivanie Blondin; Canada	40	Park Do-yeong; South Korea	20	
4	Heerenveen, Netherlands	13 December	Misaki Oshigiri; Japan	65	Carien Kleibeuker; Netherlands	43	Ivanie Blondin; Canada	20	
6	Heerenveen, Netherlands	13 March	Irene Schouten; Netherlands	60	Ivanie Blondin; Canada	40	Miho Takagi; Japan	20	

Note: in mass start, race points are accumulated during the race. The skater with most race points is the winner. The races are over 16 laps.

== Standings ==
#	Name	Nat.	CGY	SLC	INZ	HVN1	HVN2	Total
1	Irene Schouten	(Netherlands)	80	100	100	36	150	466
2	Ivanie Blondin	(Canada)	70	80	80	70	120	420
3	Misaki Oshigiri	(Japan)	25	70	—	100	76	271
4	Miho Takagi	(Japan)	36	16	28	45	104	229
5	Hao Jiachen	(China)	21	36	24	32	90	203
6	Heather Richardson-Bergsma	(United States)	50	28	45	24	36	183
7	Luiza Złotkowska	(Poland)	11	50	32	40	32	165
8	Liu Jing	(China)	14	40	50	12	45	161
9	Janneke Ensing	(Netherlands)	32	60	40	19	—	151
10	Park Do-yeong	(South Korea)	40	19	70	21	—	150
11	Francesca Bettrone	(Italy)	15	18	18	50	40	141
12	Carien Kleibeuker	(Netherlands)	—	11	25	80	14	130
13	Martina Sáblíková	(Czech Republic)	60	—	60	5	—	125
14	Francesca Lollobrigida	(Italy)	24	24	36	14	21	119
15	Kim Bo-Reum	(South Korea)	100	5	—	—	—	105
16	Vanessa Bittner	(Austria)	6	—	19	69	12	97
17	Josie Spence	(Canada)	10	45	5	28	—	88
18	Marina Zueva	(Belarus)	18	12	16	16	24	86
19	Claudia Pechstein	(Germany)	16	32	12	8	16	84
20	Jelena Peeters	(Russia)	8	14	16	18	28	84
21	Nana Takagi	(Japan)	28	25	21	0	—	74
22	Nikola Zdráhalová	(Czech Republic)	45	10	10	6	—	71
23	Noh Seon-Yeong	(South Korea)	19	21	8	0	—	48
24	Aleksandra Goss	(Poland)	8	8	6	11	18	43
25	Paige Schwartzburg	(United States)	6	15	6	15	—	42
26	Katarzyna Wozniak	(Poland)	—	6	11	8	—	25
27	Park Ji-woo	(South Korea)	—	—	15	10	—	25
28	Bente Kraus	(Germany)	12	—	4	6	—	22
29	Erin Bartlett	(United States)	0	0	0	15	—	15
30	Saskia Alusalu	(Estonia)	—	6	2	4	—	12
31	Isabelle Weidemann	(Canada)	0	8	1	0	—	9
32	Tatyana Mikhailova	(Belarus)	4	4	0	1	—	9
33	Sofie Karoline Haugen	(Norway)	—	—	8	0	—	8
34	Natalie Kerschbaummayr	(Czech Republic)	2	1	0	—	—	3
35	Natalya Voronina	(Russia)	0	—	—	2	—	2
36	Katerina Novotná	(Czech Republic)	—	2	—	—	—	2
37	Lisa van der Geest	(Netherlands)	1	—	—	—	—	1
