= 2015–16 ISU Speed Skating World Cup – World Cup 3 – Women's 1500 metres =

The women's 1500 metres race of the 2015–16 ISU Speed Skating World Cup 3, arranged in Eisstadion Inzell, in Inzell, Germany, was held on 6 December 2015.

Brittany Bowe of the United States won the race, while compatriot Heather Richardson-Bergsma came second, and Marrit Leenstra of the Netherlands came third. Kali Christ of Canada won the Division B race.

== Results ==
The race took place on Sunday, 6 December, with Division B scheduled in the morning session, at 10:45, and Division A scheduled in the afternoon session, at 14:00.

=== Division A ===
Rank	Name	Nat.	Pair	Lane	Time	WC points	GWC points
1st place, gold medalist(s)	Brittany Bowe	(United States)	10	o	1:54.68	100	100
2nd place, silver medalist(s)	Heather Richardson-Bergsma	(United States)	10	i	1:54.94	80	80
3rd place, bronze medalist(s)	Marrit Leenstra	(Netherlands)	9	o	1:55.79	70	70
4	Ida Njåtun	(Norway)	8	i	1:55.99	60	60
5	Martina Sáblíková	(Czech Republic)	9	i	1:56.17	50	50
6	Miho Takagi	(Japan)	6	o	1:56.20	45	—
7	Marije Joling	(Netherlands)	7	i	1:56.96	40	
8	Ayaka Kikuchi	(Japan)	6	i	1:57.28	36	
9	Diane Valkenburg	(Netherlands)	5	o	1:57.44	32	
10	Misaki Oshigiri	(Japan)	8	o	1:57.51	28	
11	Yekaterina Shikhova	(Russia)	3	o	1:57.77	24	
12	Natalya Voronina	(Russia)	4	o	1:58.01	21	
13	Antoinette de Jong	(Netherlands)	7	o	1:58.33	18	
14	Hao Jiachen	(China)	4	i	1:58.41	16	
15	Elizaveta Kazelina	(Russia)	3	i	1:58.64	14	
16	Sanneke de Neeling	(Netherlands)	5	i	1:59.01	12	
17	Roxanne Dufter	(Germany)	1	o	1:59.32	10	
18	Natalia Czerwonka	(Poland)	2	i	1:59.37	8	
19	Nana Takagi	(Japan)	2	o	1:59.97	6	
20	Gabriele Hirschbichler	(Germany)	1	i	2:02.62	5	

=== Division B ===
Rank	Name	Nat.	Pair	Lane	Time	WC points
1	Kali Christ	(Canada)	11	i	1:58.20	25
2	Luiza Złotkowska	(Poland)	11	o	1:58.26	19
3	Margarita Ryzhova	(Russia)	9	i	1:59.11	15
4	Paige Schwartzburg	(United States)	8	i	2:00.04	11
5	Zhao Xin	(China)	10	i	2:00.10	8
6	Katarzyna Woźniak	(Poland)	5	i	2:00.12	6
7	Liu Jing	(China)	7	i	2:00.58	4
8	Hege Bøkko	(Norway)	9	o	2:00.61	2
9	Francesca Bettrone	(Italy)	7	o	2:00.90	1
10	Park Ji-woo	(South Korea)	3	i	2:01.02	—
11	Isabelle Weidemann	(Canada)	6	o	2:01.33	
12	Saori Toi	(Japan)	8	o	2:01.95	
13	Jelena Peeters	(Belgium)	6	i	2:02.21	
14	Ellen Bjertnes	(Norway)	1	o	2:02.38	
15	Nikola Zdráhalová	(Czech Republic)	4	o	2:02.84	
16	Bente Kraus	(Germany)	3	o	2:03.55	
17	Saskia Alusalu	(Estonia)	2	o	2:03.82	
18	Park Do-yeong	(South Korea)	4	i	2:04.36	
19	Natálie Kerschbaummayr	(Czech Republic)	2	i	2:04.84	
20	Zhang Xin	(China)	1	i	2:05.34	
21	Tatyana Mikhailova	(Belarus)	5	o	2:06.78	
22	Noh Seon-yeong	(South Korea)	10	o	2:07.09	
