= 2015–16 ISU Speed Skating World Cup – Women's 3000 and 5000 metres =

The 3000 and 5000 meters distances for women in the 2015–16 ISU Speed Skating World Cup was contested as one cup over six races on six occasions, out of a total of World Cup occasions for the season, with the first occasion taking place in Calgary, Alberta, Canada, on 13–15 November 2015, and the final occasion taking place in Heerenveen, Netherlands, on 11–13 March 2016.

Martina Sáblíková of the Czech Republic became the champion, winning 5 of 6 races. She did not take part in the final race in Heerenveen.

== Top three ==
Position	Athlete	Points	Previous season

== Race medallists ==
WC #	Location	Date	Distance	Gold	Time	Silver	Time	Bronze	Time	Report
1	Calgary, Canada	13 November	3000 metres	Martina Sáblíková; Czech Republic	3:57.21	Irene Schouten; Netherlands	3:58.39	Natalya Voronina; Russia	3:58.78	
2	Salt Lake City, United States	20 November	5000 metres	Martina Sáblíková; Czech Republic	6:47.42	Natalya Voronina; Russia	6:53.16	Ivanie Blondin; Canada	6:55.88	
3	Inzell, Germany	6 December	3000 metres	Martina Sáblíková; Czech Republic	4:03.18	Marije Joling; Netherlands	4:04.08	Olga Graf; Russia	4:05.87	
4	Heerenveen, Netherlands	12 December	3000 metres	Martina Sáblíková; Czech Republic	4:03.50	Annouk van der Weijden; Netherlands	4:05.39	Olga Graf; Russia	4:06.57	
5	Stavanger, Norway	31 January	3000 metres	Martina Sáblíková; Czech Republic	4:00.08	Ireen Wüst; Netherlands	4:04.15	Irene Schouten; Netherlands	4:05.51	
6	Heerenveen, Netherlands	11 March	3000 metres	Natalya Voronina; Russia	4:08.15	Jorien Voorhuis; Netherlands	4:08.18	Olga Graf; Russia	4:08.40	

== Standings ==
Standings as of 31 January 2016.

#	Name	Nat.	CGY	SLC	INZ	HVN1	STA	HVN2	Total
1	Martina Sáblíková	(Czech Republic)	100	100	100	100	100		500
2	Natalya Voronina	(Russia)	70	80	50	50	50		300
3	Irene Schouten	(Netherlands)	80	50	25	60	70		285
4	Olga Graf	(Russia)	30	40	70	70	40		250
5	Marije Joling	(Netherlands)	45	—	80	45	60		230
6	Annouk van der Weijden	(Netherlands)	50	—	21	80	45		196
7	Claudia Pechstein	(Germany)	35	60	35	30	35		195
8	Ivanie Blondin	(Canada)	40	70	30	25	18		183
9	Jorien Voorhuis	(Netherlands)	60	—	60	35	—		155
10	Misaki Oshigiri	(Japan)	32	45	16	21	25		139
11	Yvonne Nauta	(Netherlands)	21	30	45	40	—		136
12	Miho Takagi	(Japan)	23	35	40	0	30		128
13	Elizaveta Kazelina	(Russia)	27	18	10	16	16		87
14	Isabelle Weidemann	(Canada)	19	21	14	11	21		86
15	Ireen Wüst	(Netherlands)	—	—	—	—	80		80
16	Ida Njåtun	(Norway)	25	—	18	23	14		80
17	Nana Takagi	(Japan)	10	4	32	18	5		69
18	Bente Kraus	(Germany)	11	—	11	15	27		64
19	Zhao Xin	(China)	7	2	9	32	10		60
20	Luiza Złotkowska	(Poland)	0	3	19	19	19		60
21	Josie Spence	(Canada)	3	9	6	27	12		57
22	Ayaka Kikuchi	(Japan)	14	—	27	0	7		48
23	Anna Yurakova	(Russia)	18	15	—	—	15		48
24	Stephanie Beckert	(Germany)	16	19	12	0	—		47
25	Francesca Lollobrigida	(Italy)	0	5	23	14	3		45
26	Fuyo Matsuoka	(Japan)	15	6	5	9	9		44
27	Linda de Vries	(Netherlands)	—	—	—	—	32		32
28	Carien Kleibeuker	(Netherlands)	—	32	—	—	—		32
29	Marina Zueva	(Belarus)	9	0	15	6	0		30
30	Antoinette de Jong	(Netherlands)	—	27	—	—	—		27
31	Shoko Fujimura	(Japan)	—	25	—	—	—		25
32	Yuliya Skokova	(Russia)	—	—	—	—	23		23
33	Lisa van der Geest	(Netherlands)	—	23	—	—	—		23
34	Kim Bo-reum	(South Korea)	12	7	—	—	—		19
35	Jelena Peeters	(Belgium)	4	11	3	0	—		18
36	Hao Jiachen	(China)	0	0	4	5	6		15
37	Katarzyna Woźniak	(Poland)	0	—	7	7	0		14
38	Brianne Tutt	(Canada)	—	—	—	—	11		11
39	Liu Jing	(China)	6	1	0	2	2		11
40	Natalia Czerwonka	(Poland)	—	—	2	4	4		10
41	Park Do-yeong	(South Korea)	5	0	1	0	—		6
42	Nikola Zdráhalová	(Czech Republic)	0	0	0	3	0		3
43	Francesca Bettrone	(Italy)	2	0	0	1	0		3
44	Lim Jung-soo	(South Korea)	—	—	—	—	1		1
45	Lauren McGuire	(Canada)	1	—	—	—	—		1
