= 2015–16 ISU Speed Skating World Cup – World Cup 1 – Women's 1500 metres =

The women's 1500 metres race of the 2015–16 ISU Speed Skating World Cup 1, arranged in the Olympic Oval, in Calgary, Alberta, Canada, was held on 15 November 2015.

Brittany Bowe of the United States won the race on a new world record, while compatriot Heather Richardson-Bergsma came second, and Martina Sáblíková of the Czech Republic came third. Miho Takagi of Japan won the Division B race.

== Results ==
The race took place on Sunday, 15 November, with Division B scheduled in the morning session, at 09:30, and Division A scheduled in the afternoon session, at 12:30.

=== Division A ===
Rank	Name	Nat.	Pair	Lane	Time	WC points	GWC points
1st place, gold medalist(s)	Brittany Bowe	(United States)	10	o	1:51.59 WR	100	100
2nd place, silver medalist(s)	Heather Richardson-Bergsma	(United States)	9	i	1:52.27	80	80
3rd place, bronze medalist(s)	Martina Sáblíková	(Czech Republic)	8	o	1:54.18 NR	70	70
4	Ida Njåtun	(Norway)	8	i	1:54.19	60	60
5	Marrit Leenstra	(Netherlands)	9	o	1:54.22	50	50
6	Marije Joling	(Netherlands)	10	i	1:54.43	45	—
7	Li Qishi	(China)	3	i	1:54.45	40	
8	Antoinette de Jong	(Netherlands)	7	o	1:55.28	36	
9	Sanneke de Neeling	(Netherlands)	2	o	1:55.30	32	
10	Misaki Oshigiri	(Japan)	5	o	1:55.57	28	
11	Natalya Voronina	(Russia)	6	i	1:55.75	24	
12	Ayaka Kikuchi	(Japan)	3	o	1:55.78	21	
13	Diane Valkenburg	(Netherlands)	7	i	1:55.95	18	
14	Yekaterina Shikhova	(Russia)	6	o	1:56.06	16	
15	Natalia Czerwonka	(Poland)	2	i	1:56.23	14	
16	Gabriele Hirschbichler	(Germany)	1	o	1:56.60	12	
17	Zhao Xin	(China)	4	o	1:56.65	10	
18	Luiza Złotkowska	(Poland)	5	i	1:56.82	8	
19	Kali Christ	(Canada)	4	i	1:57.24	6	
20	Kim Bo-reum	(South Korea)	1	i	1:57.83	5	

Note: WR = world record, NR = national record.

=== Division B ===
Rank	Name	Nat.	Pair	Lane	Time	WC points
1	Miho Takagi	(Japan)	10	o	1:54.56	25
2	Hao Jiachen	(China)	8	i	1:56.14	19
3	Vanessa Bittner	(Austria)	2	o	1:56.30 NR	15
4	Elizaveta Kazelina	(Russia)	9	i	1:56.39 NRJ	11
5	Margarita Ryzhova	(Russia)	11	i	1:57.35	8
6	Hege Bøkko	(Norway)	12	o	1:57.72	6
7	Noh Seon-yeong	(South Korea)	13	i	1:58.11	4
8	Josie Spence	(Canada)	5	i	1:58.37	2
9	Paige Schwartzburg	(United States)	4	o	1:58.38	1
10	Liu Jing	(China)	3	i	1:58.62	—
11	Isabelle Weidemann	(Canada)	6	o	1:58.67	
12	Brianne Tutt	(Canada)	14	o	1:58.83	
13	Katarzyna Woźniak	(Poland)	7	o	1:58.92	
14	Francesca Bettrone	(Italy)	6	i	1:59.20	
15	Tatyana Mikhailova	(Belarus)	4	i	1:59.34	
16	Park Do-yeong	(South Korea)	7	i	1:59.46	
17	Nikola Zdráhalová	(Czech Republic)	13	o	1:59.50	
18	Saori Toi	(Japan)	9	o	1:59.74	
19	Jelena Peeters	(Belgium)	11	o	2:00.05	
20	Marina Zueva	(Belarus)	12	i	2:00.30	
21	Bente Kraus	(Germany)	8	o	2:01.39	
22	Natálie Kerschbaummayr	(Czech Republic)	5	o	2:01.87	
23	Kaylin Irvine	(Canada)	1	i	2:01.92	
24	Saskia Alusalu	(Estonia)	2	i	2:02.49 NR	
25	Park Ji-woo	(South Korea)	3	o	2:03.74	
26	Roxanne Dufter	(Germany)	10	i	DNF	
26	Nana Takagi	(Japan)	14	i	DNF	

Note: NR = national record, NRJ = national record for juniors.
