= 2015–16 ISU Speed Skating World Cup – World Cup 2 – Women's 1500 metres =

The women's 1500 metres race of the 2015–16 ISU Speed Skating World Cup 2, arranged in the Utah Olympic Oval, in Salt Lake City, United States, was held on November 21, 2015.

Heather Richardson-Bergsma of the United States won the race on a new world record, while Brittany Bowe of the United States came second, also beating the old record, and Martina Sáblíková of the Czech Republic came third. Ivanie Blondin of Canada won the Division B race.

== Results ==
The race took place on Saturday, November 21, with Division B scheduled in the morning session, at 10:48, and Division A scheduled in the afternoon session, at 16:16.

=== Division A ===
Rank	Name	Nat.	Pair	Lane	Time	WC points	GWC points
1st place, gold medalist(s)	Heather Richardson-Bergsma	(United States)	10	o	1:50.85 WR	100	100
2nd place, silver medalist(s)	Brittany Bowe	(United States)	10	i	1:51.31	80	80
3rd place, bronze medalist(s)	Martina Sáblíková	(Czech Republic)	9	i	1:53.44 NR	70	70
4	Marrit Leenstra	(Netherlands)	8	i	1:53.70	60	60
5	Ida Njåtun	(Norway)	9	o	1:53.96	50	50
6	Misaki Oshigiri	(Japan)	6	o	1:54.10 NR	45	—
7	Ayaka Kikuchi	(Japan)	4	i	1:54.12	40	
8	Antoinette de Jong	(Netherlands)	7	o	1:54.51	36	
9	Miho Takagi	(Japan)	5	i	1:54.72	32	
10	Marije Joling	(Netherlands)	8	o	1:54.82	28	
11	Vanessa Bittner	(Austria)	2	i	1:55.05 NR	24	
12	Li Qishi	(China)	7	i	1:55.23	21	
13	Sanneke de Neeling	(Netherlands)	6	i	1:55.27	18	
14	Elizaveta Kazelina	(Russia)	1	o	1:55.30 NRJ	16	
15	Diane Valkenburg	(Netherlands)	3	i	1:55.65	14	
16	Hao Jiachen	(China)	4	o	1:55.75	12	
17	Natalia Czerwonka	(Poland)	2	o	1:56.48	10	
18	Yekaterina Shikhova	(Russia)	3	o	1:56.50	8	
19	Gabriele Hirschbichler	(Germany)	1	i	1:56.86	6	
20	Natalya Voronina	(Russia)	5	o	1:57.81	5	

Note: WR = world record, NR = national record, NRJ = national record for juniors.

=== Division B ===
Rank	Name	Nat.	Pair	Lane	Time	WC points
1	Ivanie Blondin	(Canada)	3	i	1:55.14	25
2	Nana Takagi	(Japan)	4	o	1:55.77	19
3	Roxanne Dufter	(Germany)	3	o	1:56.05	15
4	Kali Christ	(Canada)	12	i	1:56.28	11
5	Luiza Złotkowska	(Poland)	13	o	1:56.46	8
6	Noh Seon-yeong	(South Korea)	11	o	1:56.63	6
7	Brianne Tutt	(Canada)	9	i	1:56.77	4
8	Olga Graf	(Russia)	2	i	1:57.05	2
9	Zhao Xin	(China)	13	i	1:57.12	1
10	Hege Bøkko	(Norway)	12	o	1:57.17	—
11	Paige Schwartzburg	(United States)	10	i	1:57.75	
12	Kim Bo-reum	(South Korea)	11	i	1:57.76	
13	Saori Toi	(Japan)	7	o	1:57.93	
14	Liu Jing	(China)	10	o	1:57.98	
15	Francesca Bettrone	(Italy)	9	o	1:58.33	
16	Jelena Peeters	(Belgium)	6	i	1:58.55	
17	Tatyana Mikhailova	(Belarus)	8	i	1:59.25	
18	Marina Zueva	(Belarus)	6	o	1:59.37	
19	Katarzyna Woźniak	(Poland)	1	o	1:59.61	
20	Park Do-yeong	(South Korea)	8	o	1:59.88	
21	Park Ji-woo	(South Korea)	4	i	2:00.10	
22	Nikola Zdráhalová	(Czech Republic)	7	i	2:00.27	
23	Erin Bartlett	(United States)	1	i	2:00.85	
24	Saskia Alusalu	(Estonia)	5	o	2:02.44 NR	
25	Natálie Kerschbaummayr	(Czech Republic)	5	i	2:25.06	
26	Yekaterina Aydova	(Kazakhstan)	2	o	DNS	

Note: NR = national record.
