= 2015–16 ISU Speed Skating World Cup – World Cup 2 – Women's mass start =

The women's mass start race of the 2015–16 ISU Speed Skating World Cup 2, arranged in the Utah Olympic Oval, in Salt Lake City, United States, was held on November 22, 2015.

Irene Schouten of the Netherlands won the race, while Ivanie Blondin of Canada came second, and Misaki Oshigiri of Japan came third. Nana Takagi of Japan won the Division B race.

== Results ==
The race took place on Sunday, November 22, with Division B scheduled in the morning session, at 10:43, and Division B scheduled in the afternoon session, at 14:15.

=== Division A ===
				Race points							
Rank	Name	Nat.	Laps	Split 1	Split 2	Split 3	Finish	Total	Time	WC points	GWC points
1st place, gold medalist(s)	Irene Schouten	(Netherlands)	16				60	60	8:27.19	100	100
2nd place, silver medalist(s)	Ivanie Blondin	(Canada)	16				40	40	8:27.45	80	80
3rd place, bronze medalist(s)	Misaki Oshigiri	(Japan)	16				20	20	8:27.82	70	70
4	Janneke Ensing	(Netherlands)	16		5	5		10	8:40.65	60	60
5	Luiza Złotkowska	(Poland)	16		3	3		6	8:44.90	50	50
6	Josie Spence	(Canada)	16	5				5	8:42.88	45	—
7	Liu Jing	(China)	16	3				3	8:32.44	40	
8	Hao Jiachen	(China)	16		1			1	8:29.56	36	
9	Claudia Pechstein	(Germany)	16			1		1	8:34.77	32	
10	Heather Richardson-Bergsma	(United States)	16	1				1	8:46.26	28	
11	Francesca Lollobrigida	(Italy)	16						8:28.18	24	
12	Noh Seon-yeong	(South Korea)	16						8:28.29	21	
13	Francesca Bettrone	(Italy)	16						8:28.51	18	
14	Miho Takagi	(Japan)	16						8:31.51	16	
15	Jelena Peeters	(Belgium)	16						8:31.77	14	
16	Marina Zueva	(Belarus)	16						8:32.55	12	
17	Nikola Zdráhalová	(Czech Republic)	16						8:35.48	10	
18	Aleksandra Goss	(Poland)	16						8:42.35	8	
19	Saskia Alusalu	(Estonia)	16						8:42.51	6	
20	Kim Bo-reum	(South Korea)	15						8:01.85	5	

=== Division B ===
				Race points						
Rank	Name	Nat.	Laps	Split 1	Split 2	Split 3	Finish	Total	Time	WC points
1	Nana Takagi	(Japan)	16	3	1		60	64	8:26.42	25
2	Park Do-yeong	(South Korea)	16				40	40	8:26.47	19
3	Paige Schwartzburg	(United States)	16				20	20	8:27.22	15
4	Carien Kleibeuker	(Netherlands)	16	5	3	3		11	8:27.96	11
5	Isabelle Weidemann	(Canada)	16			5		5	8:32.84	8
6	Katarzyna Woźniak	(Poland)	16		5			5	8:33.08	6
7	Tatyana Mikhailova	(Belarus)	16			3		3	8:46.49	4
8	Katerina Novotná	(Czech Republic)	16	1				1	8:27.32	2
9	Natálie Kerschbaummayr	(Czech Republic)	16						8:46.37	1
10	Erin Bartlett	(United States)	12						7:05.66	—
