= 2015–16 ISU Speed Skating World Cup – World Cup 3 – Women's 3000 metres =

The women's 3000 metres race of the 2015–16 ISU Speed Skating World Cup 3, arranged in Eisstadion Inzell, in Inzell, Germany, was held on 4 December 2015.

Martina Sáblíková of the Czech Republic won the race, while Marije Joling of the Netherlands came second, and Olga Graf of Russia came third. Nana Takagi of Japan won the Division B race.

== Results ==
The race took place on Friday, 4 December, with Division B scheduled in the afternoon session, at 13:10, and Division A scheduled in the evening session, at 16:00.

=== Division A ===
Rank	Name	Nat.	Pair	Lane	Time	WC points	GWC points
1st place, gold medalist(s)	Martina Sáblíková	(Czech Republic)	8	i	4:03.18	100	100
2nd place, silver medalist(s)	Marije Joling	(Netherlands)	3	o	4:04.08	80	80
3rd place, bronze medalist(s)	Olga Graf	(Russia)	5	i	4:05.87	70	70
4	Jorien Voorhuis	(Netherlands)	5	o	4:05.89	60	60
5	Natalya Voronina	(Russia)	8	o	4:07.59	50	50
6	Yvonne Nauta	(Netherlands)	4	o	4:08.62	45	—
7	Miho Takagi	(Japan)	4	i	4:08.90	40	
8	Claudia Pechstein	(Germany)	6	i	4:08.97	35	
9	Ivanie Blondin	(Canada)	7	o	4:09.48	30	
10	Irene Schouten	(Netherlands)	7	i	4:09.78	25	
11	Annouk van der Weijden	(Netherlands)	3	i	4:09.94	21	
12	Ida Njåtun	(Norway)	1	o	4:09.99	18	
13	Misaki Oshigiri	(Japan)	6	o	4:11.18	16	
14	Isabelle Weidemann	(Canada)	2	o	4:11.99	14	
15	Stephanie Beckert	(Germany)	1	i	4:14.64	12	
16	Elizaveta Kazelina	(Russia)	2	i	4:24.06	10	

=== Division B ===
Rank	Name	Nat.	Pair	Lane	Time	WC points
1	Nana Takagi	(Japan)	10	o	4:07.98	32
2	Ayaka Kikuchi	(Japan)	10	i	4:08.21	27
3	Francesca Lollobrigida	(Italy)	6	i	4:09.01	23
4	Luiza Złotkowska	(Poland)	6	o	4:10.52	19
5	Marina Zueva	(Belarus)	8	i	4:10.53	15
6	Bente Kraus	(Germany)	9	o	4:11.163	11
7	Zhao Xin	(China)	8	o	4:11.168	9
8	Katarzyna Woźniak	(Poland)	3	i	4:11.42	7
9	Josie Spence	(Canada)	9	i	4:11.72	6
10	Fuyo Matsuoka	(Japan)	11	i	4:11.84	5
11	Hao Jiachen	(China)	5	o	4:12.27	4
12	Jelena Peeters	(Belgium)	11	o	4:12.41	3
13	Natalia Czerwonka	(Poland)	2	o	4:12.49	2
14	Park Do-yeong	(South Korea)	7	o	4:15.23	1
15	Nikola Zdráhalová	(Czech Republic)	4	o	4:15.77	—
16	Francesca Bettrone	(Italy)	5	i	4:18.68	
17	Liu Jing	(China)	7	i	4:19.04	
18	Saskia Alusalu	(Estonia)	2	i	4:19.68	
19	Sofie-Karoline Haugen	(Norway)	1	i	4:20.20	
20	Park Ji-woo	(South Korea)	3	o	4:20.58	
21	Aleksandra Goss	(Poland)	4	i	4:21.14	
22	Viola Feichtner	(Austria)	1	o	4:26.43	
