= 2015–16 ISU Speed Skating World Cup – World Cup 2 – Women's 5000 metres =

The women's 5000 metres race of the 2015–16 ISU Speed Skating World Cup 2, arranged in the Utah Olympic Oval, in Salt Lake City, United States, was held on November 20, 2015.

Martina Sáblíková of the Czech Republic won the race, while Natalya Voronina of Russia came second, and Ivanie Blondin of Canada came third. Carien Kleibeuker of the Netherlands won the Division B race on the best time of the day.

== Results ==
The race took place on Friday, November 20, with Division B scheduled in the morning session, at 09:00, and Division A scheduled in the afternoon session, at 13:00.

=== Division A ===
Rank	Name	Nat.	Pair	Lane	Time	WC points	GWC points
1st place, gold medalist(s)	Martina Sáblíková	(Czech Republic)	6	i	6:47.42	100	100
2nd place, silver medalist(s)	Natalya Voronina	(Russia)	5	i	6:53.16 NR	80	80
3rd place, bronze medalist(s)	Ivanie Blondin	(Canada)	5	o	6:55.88	70	70
4	Claudia Pechstein	(Germany)	4	i	6:57.23	60	60
5	Irene Schouten	(Netherlands)	6	o	7:00.19	50	50
6	Misaki Oshigiri	(Japan)	4	o	7:01.93	45	—
7	Olga Graf	(Russia)	3	i	7:02.60	40	
8	Miho Takagi	(Japan)	2	i	7:04.63	35	
9	Yvonne Nauta	(Netherlands)	2	o	7:05.88	30	
10	Shoko Fujimura	(Japan)	1	o	7:06.10	25	
11	Isabelle Weidemann	(Canada)	1	i	7:12.00	21	
12	Elizaveta Kazelina	(Russia)	3	o	7:17.50	18	

Note: NR = national record.

=== Division B ===
Rank	Name	Nat.	Pair	Lane	Time	WC points
1	Carien Kleibeuker	(Netherlands)	2	i	6:45.04 NR	32
2	Antoinette de Jong	(Netherlands)	2	o	6:56.45	27
3	Lisa van der Geest	(Netherlands)	1	i	6:57.89	23
4	Stephanie Beckert	(Germany)	12	o	6:58.75	19
5	Anna Yurakova	(Russia)	12	i	7:01.91	15
6	Jelena Peeters	(Belgium)	8	o	7:03.69 NR	11
7	Josie Spence	(Canada)	7	i	7:04.76	9
8	Kim Bo-reum	(South Korea)	11	o	7:05.55 NR	7
9	Fuyo Matsuoka	(Japan)	11	i	7:09.07	6
10	Francesca Lollobrigida	(Italy)	4	i	7:09.37 NR	5
11	Nana Takagi	(Japan)	10	i	7:10.227	4
12	Luiza Złotkowska	(Poland)	6	o	7:10.228	3
13	Zhao Xin	(China)	9	i	7:10.72	2
14	Liu Jing	(China)	9	o	7:10.88	1
15	Hao Jiachen	(China)	3	o	7:11.10	—
16	Aleksandra Goss	(Poland)	6	i	7:11.17	
17	Park Do-yeong	(South Korea)	8	i	7:11.93	
18	Marina Zueva	(Belarus)	10	o	7:12.24 NR	
19	Nikola Zdráhalová	(Czech Republic)	5	i	7:17.00	
20	Urszula Włodarczyk	(Poland)	5	o	7:17.15	
21	Maria Lamb	(United States)	3	i	7:24.36	
22	Francesca Bettrone	(Italy)	7	o	7:29.92	
23	Saskia Alusalu	(Estonia)	4	o	7:30.81 NR	

Note: NR = national record.
