= 2015–16 ISU Speed Skating World Cup – World Cup 3 – Women's team pursuit =

The women's team pursuit race of the 2015–16 ISU Speed Skating World Cup 3, arranged in Eisstadion Inzell, in Inzell, Germany, was held on 5 December 2015.

The Japanese team won the race, while the Dutch team came second, and the Russian team came third.

== Results ==
The race took place on Saturday, 5 December, in the afternoon session, scheduled at 16:47.

Rank	Country	Skaters	Pair	Lane	Time	WC points
1st place, gold medalist(s)	Japan	Miho Takagi; Nana Takagi; Misaki Oshigiri	4	c	2:59.08	100
2nd place, silver medalist(s)	Netherlands	Marrit Leenstra; Antoinette de Jong; Marije Joling	4	f	2:59.69	80
3rd place, bronze medalist(s)	Russia	Natalya Voronina; Olga Graf; Elizaveta Kazelina	3	f	3:00.36	70
4	Poland	Luiza Złotkowska; Natalia Czerwonka; Katarzyna Woźniak	1	c	3:02.20	60
5	Germany	Claudia Pechstein; Roxanne Dufter; Gabriele Hirschbichler	2	c	3:02.58	50
6	Canada	Ivanie Blondin; Josie Spence; Isabelle Weidemann	3	c	3:02.70	45
7	South Korea	Noh Seon-yeong; Park Do-yeong; Park Ji-woo	2	f	3:05.27	40
8	China	Liu Jing; Zhao Xin; Hao Jiachen	1	f	3:06.36	35
