= 2015–16 ISU Speed Skating World Cup – World Cup 3 – Women's mass start =

The women's mass start race of the 2015–16 ISU Speed Skating World Cup 3, arranged in Eisstadion Inzell, in Inzell, Germany, was held on 6 December 2015.

Irene Schouten of the Netherlands won the race, while Ivanie Blondin of Canada came second, and Park Do-yeong of South Korea came third. Carien Kleibeuker of the Netherlands won the Division B race.

== Results ==
The race took place on Sunday, 6 December, with Division A scheduled in the afternoon session, at 16:48, and Division B scheduled in the evening session, at 18:07.

=== Division A ===
				Race points							
Rank	Name	Nat.	Laps	Split 1	Split 2	Split 3	Finish	Total	Time	WC points	GWC points
1st place, gold medalist(s)	Irene Schouten	(Netherlands)	16				60	60	8:18.41	100	100
2nd place, silver medalist(s)	Ivanie Blondin	(Canada)	16				40	40	8:18.43	80	80
3rd place, bronze medalist(s)	Park Do-yeong	(South Korea)	16				20	20	8:18.61	70	70
4	Martina Sáblíková	(Czech Republic)	16			5		5	8:21.39	60	60
5	Liu Jing	(China)	16		5			5	8:23.24	50	50
6	Heather Richardson-Bergsma	(United States)	16	5				5	8:55.08	45	—
7	Janneke Ensing	(Netherlands)	16	1		3		4	8:21.67	40	
8	Francesca Lollobrigida	(Italy)	16	3				3	8:18.83	36	
9	Luiza Złotkowska	(Poland)	16		3			3	8:23.46	32	
10	Miho Takagi	(Japan)	16			1		1	8:22.74	28	
11	Hao Jiachen	(China)	16		1			1	8:22.88	24	
12	Nana Takagi	(Japan)	16						8:19.00	21	
13	Francesca Bettrone	(Italy)	16						8:21.33	18	
14	Jelena Peeters	(Belgium)	16						8:22.68	16	
14	Marina Zueva	(Belarus)	16						8:22.68	16	
16	Claudia Pechstein	(Germany)	16						8:22.91	12	
17	Nikola Zdráhalová	(Czech Republic)	16						8:23.16	10	
18	Noh Seon-yeong	(South Korea)	16						8:42.35	8	
19	Paige Schwartzburg	(United States)	13						7:25.01	6	
20	Josie Spence	(Canada)	10						5:53.92	5	

=== Division B ===
				Race points						
Rank	Name	Nat.	Laps	Split 1	Split 2	Split 3	Finish	Total	Time	WC points
1	Carien Kleibeuker	(Netherlands)	16		5	5	60	70	8:33.94	25
2	Vanessa Bittner	(Austria)	16		3		40	43	8:58.06	19
3	Park Ji-woo	(South Korea)	16				20	20	8:58.15	15
4	Katarzyna Woźniak	(Poland)	16	5	1			6	8:59.35	11
5	Sofie-Karoline Haugen	(Norway)	16	1		3		4	9:02.04	8
6	Aleksandra Goss	(Poland)	16	3				3	9:01.43	6
7	Bente Kraus	(Germany)	16			1		1	9:01.72	4
8	Saskia Alusalu	(Estonia)	16	1				1	9:02.82	2
9	Isabelle Weidemann	(Canada)	16						8:59.63	1
10	Erin Bartlett	(United States)	16						9:00.37	—
11	Roxanne Dufter	(Germany)	16						9:00.43	
12	Viola Feichtner	(Austria)	16						9:00.88	
13	Tatyana Mikhailova	(Belarus)	16						9:08.29	
14	Natálie Kerschbaummayr	(Czech Republic)	15						8:40.54	
