= List of Estonian records =

The list of Estonian records might refer to:

- List of Estonian records in athletics
- List of Estonian records in Olympic weightlifting
- List of Estonian records in speed skating
- List of Estonian records in swimming
- List of Estonian records in track cycling

== See also ==
- Category:Albums by Estonian artists
- Estonian Record Productions
