= 2015–16 ISU Speed Skating World Cup – World Cup 3 – Men's 500 metres =

The men's 500 metres races of the 2015–16 ISU Speed Skating World Cup 3, arranged in Eisstadion Inzell, in Inzell, Germany, were held on 4 and 6 December 2015.

Gilmore Junio of Canada won race one, while his compatriot Alexandre St-Jean came second, and Artur Waś of Poland came third. David Bosa of Italy won the first Division B race.

Waś won race two, with Alex Boisvert-Lacroix of Canada in second place, and Kai Verbij of the Netherlands in third. Roman Krech of Kazakhstan won the second Division B race.

== Race 1 ==
Race one took place on Friday, 4 December, with Division B scheduled in the afternoon session, at 12:20, and Division A scheduled in the evening session, at 17:29.

=== Division A ===
Rank	Name	Nat.	Pair	Lane	Time	WC points	GWC points
1st place, gold medalist(s)	Gilmore Junio	(Canada)	9	o	34.86	100	50
2nd place, silver medalist(s)	Alexandre St-Jean	(Canada)	5	o	34.90	80	40
3rd place, bronze medalist(s)	Artur Waś	(Poland)	8	o	34.971	70	35
4	Laurent Dubreuil	(Canada)	10	o	34.972	60	30
5	Hein Otterspeer	(Netherlands)	2	i	34.975	50	25
6	Ryohei Haga	(Japan)	5	i	34.99	45	—
7	Gerben Jorritsma	(Netherlands)	4	i	35.00	40	
8	Yūya Oikawa	(Japan)	6	i	35.01	36	
9	Alex Boisvert-Lacroix	(Canada)	9	i	35.04	32	
10	Aleksey Yesin	(Russia)	2	o	35.06	28	
11	Ruslan Murashov	(Russia)	7	o	35.07	24	
12	Espen Aarnes Hvammen	(Norway)	6	o	35.083	21	
13	Jan Smeekens	(Netherlands)	3	o	35.088	18	
14	Kai Verbij	(Netherlands)	7	i	35.09	16	
15	Roman Krech	(Kazakhstan)	1	i	35.12	14	
16	Kim Tae-yun	(South Korea)	4	o	35.17	12	
17	Artyom Kuznetsov	(Russia)	3	i	35.18	10	
18	William Dutton	(Canada)	10	i	35.20	8	
19	Joji Kato	(Japan)	8	i	35.67	6	

=== Division B ===
Rank	Name	Nat.	Pair	Lane	Time	WC points
1	David Bosa	(Italy)	11	o	35.21	25
2	Artur Nogal	(Poland)	7	i	35.23	19
3	Kjeld Nuis	(Netherlands)	13	o	35.32	15
4	Mo Tae-bum	(South Korea)	13	i	35.33	11
5	Nico Ihle	(Germany)	10	o	35.34	8
6	Kim Jun-ho	(South Korea)	10	i	35.39	6
7	Xie Jiaxuan	(China)	11	i	35.40	4
8	Tsubasa Hasegawa	(Japan)	12	o	35.41	2
9	Piotr Michalski	(Poland)	9	i	35.42	1
10	Lee Kang-seok	(South Korea)	8	i	35.456	—
11	Mirko Giacomo Nenzi	(Italy)	8	o	35.459	
12	Mu Zhongsheng	(China)	12	i	35.51	
13	Pekka Koskela	(Finland)	9	o	35.55	
14	Jonathan Garcia	(United States)	6	i	35.59	
15	Tsukasa Owada	(Japan)	7	o	35.84	
16	Liu An	(China)	6	o	35.85	
17	Harri Levo	(Finland)	2	i	35.89	
18	Denis Koval	(Russia)	4	o	36.11	
19	Christian Oberbichler	(Switzerland)	5	o	36.13	
20	Marten Liiv	(Estonia)	2	o	36.35	
21	Simen Kroken	(Norway)	1	i	36.61	
22	Artyom Chaban	(Belarus)	1	o	36.82	
23	Denis Kuzin	(Kazakhstan)	3	o	36.88	
24	Juho Vaittinen	(Finland)	4	i	DQ	
24	Wang Chaoyu	(China)	3	i	DQ	
26	Daniel Greig	(Australia)	5	i	DNS	

== Race 2 ==
Race two took place on Sunday, 6 December, with Division B scheduled in the morning session, at 09:59, and Division A scheduled in the afternoon session, at 16:08.

=== Division A ===
Rank	Name	Nat.	Pair	Lane	Time	WC points	GWC points
1st place, gold medalist(s)	Artur Waś	(Poland)	8	o	34.65	100	50
2nd place, silver medalist(s)	Alex Boisvert-Lacroix	(Canada)	8	i	34.74	80	40
3rd place, bronze medalist(s)	Kai Verbij	(Netherlands)	5	i	34.80	70	35
4	Gilmore Junio	(Canada)	10	o	34.83	60	30
5	Mika Poutala	(Finland)	9	o	34.84	50	25
6	Aleksey Yesin	(Russia)	2	o	34.87	45	—
7	Jan Smeekens	(Netherlands)	3	o	34.921	40	
8	Hein Otterspeer	(Netherlands)	4	o	34.926	36	
9	Laurent Dubreuil	(Canada)	9	i	34.95	32	
10	David Bosa	(Italy)	1	i	34.96	28	
11	Artyom Kuznetsov	(Russia)	2	i	34.99	24	
12	Ryohei Haga	(Japan)	6	o	35.01	21	
13	Yūya Oikawa	(Japan)	7	o	35.02	18	
14	William Dutton	(Canada)	10	i	35.04	16	
15	Espen Aarnes Hvammen	(Norway)	4	i	35.06	14	
16	Alexandre St-Jean	(Canada)	7	i	35.08	12	
17	Kim Tae-yun	(South Korea)	3	i	35.12	10	
18	Ruslan Murashov	(Russia)	6	i	35.18	8	
19	Artur Nogal	(Poland)	1	o	35.36	6	
20	Joji Kato	(Japan)	5	o	35.38	5	

=== Division B ===
Rank	Name	Nat.	Pair	Lane	Time	WC points
1	Roman Krech	(Kazakhstan)	12	i	35.23	25
2	Tsubasa Hasegawa	(Japan)	9	i	35.32	19
3	Mo Tae-bum	(South Korea)	12	o	35.33	15
4	Lee Kang-seok	(South Korea)	8	o	35.412	11
5	Pekka Koskela	(Finland)	8	i	35.417	8
6	Jonathan Garcia	(United States)	6	o	35.46	6
7	Kim Jun-ho	(South Korea)	10	i	35.49	4
8	Mirko Giacomo Nenzi	(Italy)	7	i	35.54	2
9	Denis Koval	(Russia)	3	o	35.55	1
10	Tsukasa Owada	(Japan)	6	i	35.56	—
11	Daniel Greig	(Australia)	5	o	35.622	
12	Xie Jiaxuan	(China)	10	o	35.627	
13	Mu Zhongsheng	(China)	11	i	35.69	
14	Piotr Michalski	(Poland)	9	o	35.80	
15	Nico Ihle	(Germany)	11	o	35.85	
16	Liu An	(China)	5	i	35.87	
17	Christian Oberbichler	(Switzerland)	4	o	35.91	
18	Joel Dufter	(Germany)	4	i	35.98	
19	Wang Chaoyu	(China)	7	o	36.23	
20	Marten Liiv	(Estonia)	2	i	36.29	
21	Juho Vaittinen	(Finland)	3	i	36.47	
22	Artyom Chaban	(Belarus)	1	i	36.48	
23	Denis Kuzin	(Kazakhstan)	1	o	36.51	
24	Simen Kroken	(Norway)	2	o	36.68	
