= 2015–16 ISU Speed Skating World Cup – World Cup 3 – Men's 5000 metres =

The men's 5000 metres race of the 2015–16 ISU Speed Skating World Cup 3, arranged in Eisstadion Inzell, in Inzell, Germany, was held on 5 December 2015.

Jorrit Bergsma of the Netherlands won the race, while Sverre Lunde Pedersen of Norway came second, and Arjan Stroetinga of the Netherlands came third. Håvard Bøkko of Norway won the Division B race.

== Results ==
The race took place on Saturday, 5 December, with Division B scheduled in the morning session, at 11:23, and Division A scheduled in the afternoon session, at 15:15.

=== Division A ===
Rank	Name	Nat.	Pair	Lane	Time	WC points	GWC points
1st place, gold medalist(s)	Jorrit Bergsma	(Netherlands)	8	i	6:17.35	100	100
2nd place, silver medalist(s)	Sverre Lunde Pedersen	(Norway)	6	i	6:19.52	80	80
3rd place, bronze medalist(s)	Arjan Stroetinga	(Netherlands)	3	o	6:21.66	70	70
4	Douwe de Vries	(Netherlands)	4	i	6:21.85	60	60
5	Peter Michael	(New Zealand)	7	i	6:23.51	50	50
6	Erik Jan Kooiman	(Netherlands)	7	o	6:23.56	45	—
7	Patrick Beckert	(Germany)	8	o	6:23.76	40	
8	Moritz Geisreiter	(Germany)	5	o	6:24.11	35	
9	Alexis Contin	(France)	2	o	6:24.31	30	
10	Andrea Giovannini	(Italy)	6	o	6:26.06	25	
11	Jordan Belchos	(Canada)	5	i	6:26.41	21	
12	Bob de Jong	(Netherlands)	1	o	6:27.08	18	
13	Yevgeny Seryaev	(Russia)	1	i	6:28.75	16	
14	Aleksandr Rumyantsev	(Russia)	3	i	6:32.91	14	
15	Viktor Hald Thorup	(Denmark)	2	i	6:34.05	12	
16	Lee Seung-hoon	(South Korea)	4	o	6:43.26	10	

=== Division B ===
Rank	Name	Nat.	Pair	Lane	Time	WC points
1	Håvard Bøkko	(Norway)	12	o	6:22.88	32
2	Ryosuke Tsuchiya	(Japan)	9	o	6:24.38	27
3	Ole Bjørnsmoen Næss	(Norway)	5	o	6:26.97	23
4	Jonas Pflug	(Germany)	3	i	6:27.05	19
5	Shane Williamson	(Japan)	9	i	6:27.14	15
6	Haralds Silovs	(Latvia)	4	i	6:28.77	11
7	Michele Malfatti	(Italy)	2	i	6:28.83	9
8	Danil Sinitsyn	(Russia)	4	o	6:31.78	7
9	Kim Min-seok	(South Korea)	2	o	6:32.15	6
10	Thomas-Henrik Søfteland	(Norway)	3	o	6:33.92	5
11	Kim Cheol-min	(South Korea)	7	i	6:34.40	4
12	Reyon Kay	(New Zealand)	10	i	6:34.91	3
13	Sun Longjiang	(China)	10	o	6:35.66	2
14	Sergey Gryaztsov	(Russia)	11	o	6:36.63	1
15	Livio Wenger	(Switzerland)	8	i	6:38.69	—
16	Ian Quinn	(United States)	6	i	6:39.75	
17	Linus Heidegger	(Austria)	8	o	6:39.84	
18	Tormod Bjørnetun Haugen	(Norway)	1	o	6:39.94	
19	Piotr Puszkarski	(Poland)	1	i	6:44.85	
20	Adrian Wielgat	(Poland)	7	o	6:45.37	
21	Aoi Yokoyama	(Japan)	6	o	6:47.25	
22	Dmitry Babenko	(Kazakhstan)	12	i	6:47.30	
23	Iñigo Vidondo	(Spain)	5	i	6:50.71	
24	Jan Szymański	(Poland)	11	i	DNF	
