= 2015–16 ISU Speed Skating World Cup – World Cup 3 – Women's 1000 metres =

The women's 1000 metres race of the 2015–16 ISU Speed Skating World Cup 3, arranged in Eisstadion Inzell, in Inzell, Germany, was held on 5 December 2015.

Brittany Bowe of the United States won the race, while compatriot Heather Richardson-Bergsma came second, and Lee Sang-hwa of South Korea came third. Erina Kamiya of Japan won the Division B race.

== Results ==
The race took place on Saturday, 5 December, with Division B scheduled in the morning session, at 10:35, and Division A scheduled in the afternoon session, at 14:30.

=== Division A ===
Rank	Name	Nat.	Pair	Lane	Time	WC points	GWC points
1st place, gold medalist(s)	Brittany Bowe	(United States)	10	i	1:14.01	100	100
2nd place, silver medalist(s)	Heather Richardson-Bergsma	(United States)	10	o	1:14.52	80	80
3rd place, bronze medalist(s)	Lee Sang-hwa	(South Korea)	3	i	1:15.27	70	70
4	Li Qishi	(China)	8	i	1:15.47	60	60
5	Marrit Leenstra	(Netherlands)	9	i	1:15.53	50	50
6	Ida Njåtun	(Norway)	6	o	1:15.70	45	—
7	Vanessa Bittner	(Austria)	9	o	1:15.71	40	
8	Yekaterina Shikhova	(Russia)	3	o	1:15.92	36	
9	Miho Takagi	(Japan)	5	o	1:15.94	32	
10	Olga Fatkulina	(Russia)	8	o	1:15.98	28	
11	Sanneke de Neeling	(Netherlands)	5	i	1:16.01	24	
12	Ayaka Kikuchi	(Japan)	4	i	1:16.05	21	
13	Karolína Erbanová	(Czech Republic)	7	o	1:16.16	18	
14	Margot Boer	(Netherlands)	7	i	1:16.19	16	
15	Gabriele Hirschbichler	(Germany)	6	i	1:16.36	14	
16	Hege Bøkko	(Norway)	2	o	1:16.44	12	
17	Roxanne Dufter	(Germany)	2	i	1:16.98	10	
18	Maki Tsuji	(Japan)	4	o	1:17.79	8	
19	Nadezhda Aseyeva	(Russia)	1	o	1:18.74	6	
20	Nao Kodaira	(Japan)	1	i	1:43.40	5	

=== Division B ===
Rank	Name	Nat.	Pair	Lane	Time	WC points
1	Erina Kamiya	(Japan)	10	i	1:16.76	25
2	Kim Hyun-yung	(South Korea)	7	i	1:16.96	19
3	Margarita Ryzhova	(Russia)	8	o	1:17.00	15
4	Yekaterina Aydova	(Kazakhstan)	11	i	1:17.13	11
5	Kaylin Irvine	(Canada)	7	o	1:17.21	8
6	Janine Smit	(Netherlands)	3	i	1:17.42	6
7	Martina Sáblíková	(Czech Republic)	11	o	1:17.49	4
8	Natalia Czerwonka	(Poland)	8	i	1:17.607	2
9	Heather McLean	(Canada)	9	i	1:17.609	1
10	Sugar Todd	(United States)	10	o	1:17.63	—
11	Linda de Vries	(Netherlands)	9	o	1:17.77	
12	Kim Min-sun	(South Korea)	6	i	1:18.13	
13	Paige Schwartzburg	(United States)	6	o	1:18.26	
14	Ellen Bjertnes	(Norway)	2	i	1:19.19	
15	Yvonne Daldossi	(Italy)	4	i	1:19.37	
16	Li Huawei	(China)	3	o	1:19.49	
17	Aleksandra Kapruziak	(Poland)	2	o	1:20.34	
18	Zhang Xin	(China)	4	o	1:20.35	
19	Elina Risku	(Finland)	5	o	1:20.87	
20	Yuliya Kozyreva	(Russia)	1	i	1:22.03	
21	Marsha Hudey	(Canada)	5	i	DQ	
