= 2015–16 ISU Speed Skating World Cup – World Cup 2 – Men's 500 metres =

The men's 500 metres races of the 2015–16 ISU Speed Skating World Cup 2, arranged in the Utah Olympic Oval, in Salt Lake City, United States, was held on November 20 and 22, 2015.

Pavel Kulizhnikov of Russia won race one on a new world record, while Mitchell Whitmore of the United States came second, and William Dutton of Canada came third. Alexandre St-Jean of Canada won the first Division B race.

Kulizhnikov also won race two, with Dutton in second place, and Laurent Dubreuil of Canada in third. Kim Tae-yun of South Korea won the second Division B race.

== Race 1 ==
Race one took place on Friday, November 20, with Division B scheduled in the morning session, at 11:04, and Division A scheduled in the afternoon session, at 14:35.

=== Division A ===
Rank	Name	Nat.	Pair	Lane	Time	WC points	GWC points
1st place, gold medalist(s)	Pavel Kulizhnikov	(Russia)	10	i	33.98 WR	100	50
2nd place, silver medalist(s)	Mitchell Whitmore	(United States)	6	i	34.19 NR	80	40
3rd place, bronze medalist(s)	William Dutton	(Canada)	10	o	34.35	70	35
4	Kai Verbij	(Netherlands)	4	o	34.36	60	30
5	Ronald Mulder	(Netherlands)	9	o	34.37	50	25
6	Jan Smeekens	(Netherlands)	1	i	34.41	45	—
7	Alex Boisvert-Lacroix	(Canada)	8	i	34.44	40	
8	Mika Poutala	(Finland)	9	i	34.50	36	
9	Joji Kato	(Japan)	4	i	34.52	32	
10	Gilmore Junio	(Canada)	7	i	34.530	28	
11	Espen Aarnes Hvammen	(Norway)	2	i	34.538 NR	24	
12	Ryohei Haga	(Japan)	5	o	34.56	21	
13	Artyom Kuznetsov	(Russia)	3	i	34.58	18	
14	Kim Tae-yun	(South Korea)	1	o	34.59	16	
15	Laurent Dubreuil	(Canada)	8	o	34.60	14	
16	Yūya Oikawa	(Japan)	7	o	34.634	12	
17	Aleksey Yesin	(Russia)	3	o	34.637	10	
18	Artur Waś	(Poland)	5	i	34.662	8	
19	Hein Otterspeer	(Netherlands)	2	o	34.664	6	
20	Ruslan Murashov	(Russia)	6	o	34.81	5	

Note: WR = world record, NR = national record.

=== Division B ===
Rank	Name	Nat.	Pair	Lane	Time	WC points
1	Alexandre St-Jean	(Canada)	14	i	34.57	25
2	Mo Tae-bum	(South Korea)	8	o	34.70	19
3	Mu Zhongsheng	(China)	10	o	34.77	15
4	Roman Krech	(Kazakhstan)	14	o	34.79	11
5	Tsubasa Hasegawa	(Japan)	12	i	34.81	8
6	Piotr Michalski	(Poland)	9	o	34.83	6
7	Mirko Giacomo Nenzi	(Italy)	9	i	34.84	4
8	Xie Jiaxuan	(China)	7	o	34.93	2
9	Liu Fangyi	(China)	10	i	34.94	1
10	David Bosa	(Italy)	11	o	35.00	—
11	Kim Jun-ho	(South Korea)	13	i	35.01	
12	Sung Ching-Yang	(Chinese Taipei)	6	i	35.11	
13	Nico Ihle	(Germany)	13	o	35.13	
14	Tsukasa Owada	(Japan)	7	i	35.166	
15	Lee Kang-seok	(South Korea)	11	i	35.167	
16	Jonathan Garcia	(United States)	4	i	35.230	
17	Artur Nogal	(Poland)	8	i	35.233	
18	Liu An	(China)	6	o	35.26	
19	Kimani Griffin	(United States)	2	o	35.31	
20	Pekka Koskela	(Finland)	12	o	35.32	
21	Daniel Greig	(Australia)	5	i	35.37	
22	Christian Oberbichler	(Switzerland)	3	i	35.68 NR	
23	Fyodor Mezentsev	(Kazakhstan)	2	i	35.77	
24	Joel Dufter	(Germany)	4	o	35.81	
25	Juho Vaittinen	(Finland)	3	o	35.82	
26	Hubert Hirschbichler	(Germany)	1	o	35.96	
27	Brett Perry	(United States)	1	i	36.19	
28	Kirill Golubev	(Russia)	5	o	DQ	

Note: NR = national record.

== Race 2 ==
Race two took place on Sunday, November 22, with Division B scheduled at 09:50, and Division A scheduled at 13:35.

=== Division A ===
Rank	Name	Nat.	Pair	Lane	Time	WC points	GWC points
1st place, gold medalist(s)	Pavel Kulizhnikov	(Russia)	10	i	34.13	100	50
2nd place, silver medalist(s)	William Dutton	(Canada)	10	o	34.34	80	40
3rd place, bronze medalist(s)	Laurent Dubreuil	(Canada)	6	i	34.36	70	35
4	Mika Poutala	(Finland)	9	i	34.37	60	30
5	Artur Waś	(Poland)	4	o	34.42 NR	50	25
6	Joji Kato	(Japan)	5	i	34.432	45	—
7	Ruslan Murashov	(Russia)	4	i	34.434	40	
8	Alexandre St-Jean	(Canada)	2	o	34.460	36	
9	Espen Aarnes Hvammen	(Norway)	2	i	34.464 NR	32	
10	Alex Boisvert-Lacroix	(Canada)	8	o	34.467	28	
11	Mitchell Whitmore	(United States)	8	i	34.50	24	
12	Gerben Jorritsma	(Netherlands)	3	i	34.532	21	
13	Gilmore Junio	(Canada)	7	i	34.538	18	
14	Ryohei Haga	(Japan)	5	o	34.574	16	
15	Ronald Mulder	(Netherlands)	9	o	34.579	14	
16	Kai Verbij	(Netherlands)	7	o	34.58	12	
17	Artyom Kuznetsov	(Russia)	3	o	34.64	10	
18	Mo Tae-bum	(South Korea)	1	i	34.67	8	
19	Yūya Oikawa	(Japan)	6	o	34.69	6	
20	Mu Zhongsheng	(China)	1	o	34.89	5	

Note: NR = national record.

=== Division B ===
Rank	Name	Nat.	Pair	Lane	Time	WC points
1	Kim Tae-yun	(South Korea)	15	i	34.59	25
2	Hein Otterspeer	(Netherlands)	14	i	34.65	19
3	Roman Krech	(Kazakhstan)	14	o	34.66 NR	15
4	Xie Jiaxuan	(China)	8	i	34.795	11
5	David Bosa	(Italy)	9	i	34.796 NR	8
6	Kjeld Nuis	(Netherlands)	13	i	34.81	6
7	Artur Nogal	(Poland)	8	o	34.98	4
8	Sung Ching-Yang	(Chinese Taipei)	7	o	35.063	2
9	Mirko Giacomo Nenzi	(Italy)	10	o	35.064	1
10	Jonathan Garcia	(United States)	6	o	35.07	—
11	Tsukasa Owada	(Japan)	7	i	35.17	
12	Liu Fangyi	(China)	9	o	35.17	
13	Kim Jun-ho	(South Korea)	12	i	35.20	
14	Liu An	(China)	6	i	35.31	
15	Lee Kang-seok	(South Korea)	10	i	35.36	
16	Piotr Michalski	(Poland)	11	i	35.40	
17	Daniel Greig	(Australia)	5	i	35.54	
18	Christian Oberbichler	(Switzerland)	3	i	35.55 NR	
19	Kirill Golubev	(Russia)	4	i	35.60	
20	Kimani Griffin	(United States)	5	o	35.68	
21	Hubert Hirschbichler	(Germany)	2	i	35.84	
22	Joel Dufter	(Germany)	4	o	35.88	
23	Brett Perry	(United States)	2	o	36.20	
24	Nico Ihle	(Germany)	12	o	36.21	
25	Aleksandr Zhigin	(Kazakhstan)	1	o	36.45	
26	Tsubasa Hasegawa	(Japan)	13	o	1:04.52	
27	Aleksey Yesin	(Russia)	15	o	DQ	
27	Juho Vaittinen	(Finland)	3	o	DQ	
29	David Andersson	(Sweden)	1	i	DNS	
30	Pekka Koskela	(Finland)	11	o	WDR	

Note: NR = national record.
