= 2015–16 ISU Speed Skating World Cup – World Cup 2 – Men's mass start =

The men's mass start race of the 2015–16 ISU Speed Skating World Cup 2, arranged in the Utah Olympic Oval, in Salt Lake City, United States, was held on November 22, 2015.

Arjan Stroetinga of the Netherlands won the race, while Fabio Francolini of Italy came second, and Bart Swings of Belgium came third. Joey Mantia of the United States won the Division B race.

== Results ==
The race took place on Sunday, November 22, with Division B scheduled in the morning session, at 11:13, and Division B scheduled in the afternoon session, at 14:45.

=== Division A ===
				Race points							
Rank	Name	Nat.	Laps	Split 1	Split 2	Split 3	Finish	Total	Time	WC points	GWC points
1st place, gold medalist(s)	Arjan Stroetinga	(Netherlands)	16				60	60	7:19.76	100	100
2nd place, silver medalist(s)	Fabio Francolini	(Italy)	16	1			40	41	7:20.38	80	80
3rd place, bronze medalist(s)	Bart Swings	(Belgium)	16			1	20	21	7:20.51	70	70
4	Alexis Contin	(France)	16	3		5		8	7:34.56	60	60
5	Viktor Hald Thorup	(Denmark)	16		5			5	7:40.01	50	50
6	Kim Cheol-min	(South Korea)	16	5				5	7:47.12	45	—
7	Jorrit Bergsma	(Netherlands)	16		3			3	7:24.73	40	
8	Sun Longjiang	(China)	16			3		3	7:33.24	36	
9	Peter Michael	(New Zealand)	16		1			1	7:37.45	32	
10	Lee Seung-hoon	(South Korea)	16						7:36.45	28	
11	K. C. Boutiette	(United States)	16						7:26.56	24	
12	Shota Nakamura	(Japan)	16						7:26.63	21	
13	Jordan Belchos	(Canada)	16						7:27.20	18	
14	Reyon Kay	(New Zealand)	16						7:27.26	16	
15	Andrea Giovannini	(Italy)	16						7:27.99	14	
16	Mathias Vosté	(Belgium)	16						7:29.15	12	
17	Linus Heidegger	(Austria)	16						7:31.03	10	
18	Robert Watson	(Canada)	16						7:31.06	8	
19	Yevgeny Seryaev	(Russia)	16						7:31.22	6	
20	Shane Williamson	(Japan)	16						7:41.99	5	
21	Vitaly Mikhailov	(Belarus)	16						7:43.46	4	
22	Armin Hager	(Austria)	16						7:44.57	3	
23	Livio Wenger	(Switzerland)	16						7:47.39	2	
24	Anton Kapustin	(Belarus)	9						4:58.18	1	

=== Division B ===
				Race points						
Rank	Name	Nat.	Laps	Split 1	Split 2	Split 3	Finish	Total	Time	WC points
1	Joey Mantia	(United States)	16	1			60	61	7:55.98	25
2	Haralds Silovs	(Latvia)	16	1			40	41	7:56.35	19
3	Joo Hyung-joon	(South Korea)	16			1	20	21	7:56.66	15
4	Jan Blokhuijsen	(Netherlands)	16		5			5	7:57.49	11
5	Olivier Jean	(Canada)	16	5				5	8:09.73	8
6	Dmitry Babenko	(Kazakhstan)	16			5		5	8:14.60	6
7	Ryosuke Tsuchiya	(Japan)	16		3			3	7:58.69	4
8	Jan Szymański	(Poland)	16	3				3	8:07.10	2
9	Marcin Bachanek	(Poland)	16			3		3	8:26.28	1
10	Nicola Tumolero	(Italy)	16		1			1	7:57.35	—
11	Jeffrey Swider-Peltz	(United States)	16						7:57.65	
12	Yang Fan	(China)	16						7:57.93	
13	Patrick Beckert	(Germany)	16						8:01.98	
14	Håvard Bøkko	(Norway)	16						8:04.08	
15	Mario Valencia	(Colombia)	16						8:05.79	
16	Martin Hänggi	(Switzerland)	16						8:07.62	
17	Iñigo Vidondo	(Spain)	16						8:18.71	
