= 2015–16 ISU Speed Skating World Cup – World Cup 2 – Women's 500 metres =

The women's 500 metres races of the 2015–16 ISU Speed Skating World Cup 2, arranged in the Utah Olympic Oval, in Salt Lake City, United States, was held on November 20 and 21, 2015.

Zhang Hong of China won race one, while Brittany Bowe and Heather Richardson-Bergsma, both of the United States, came second and third. Kim Min-sun of South Korea won the first Division B race.

Zhang also won race two, while Lee Sang-hwa of South Korea came second, and Bowe came third. Nadezhda Aseyeva of Russia won the second Division B race.

== Race 1 ==
Race one took place on Friday, November 20, with Division B scheduled in the morning session, at 10:23, and Division A scheduled in the afternoon session, at 14:10.

=== Division A ===
Rank	Name	Nat.	Pair	Lane	Time	WC points	GWC points
1st place, gold medalist(s)	Zhang Hong	(China)	10	i	36.56 NR	100	50
2nd place, silver medalist(s)	Brittany Bowe	(United States)	9	o	37.03	80	40
3rd place, bronze medalist(s)	Heather Richardson-Bergsma	(United States)	9	i	37.13	70	35
4	Lee Sang-hwa	(South Korea)	10	o	37.19	60	30
5	Yu Jing	(China)	8	i	37.30	50	25
6	Vanessa Bittner	(Austria)	8	o	37.43 NR	45	—
7	Nao Kodaira	(Japan)	6	o	37.50	40	
8	Sugar Todd	(United States)	2	o	37.63	36	
9	Olga Fatkulina	(Russia)	6	i	37.64	32	
10	Maki Tsuji	(Japan)	7	o	37.68	28	
11	Karolína Erbanová	(Czech Republic)	5	o	37.75	24	
12	Erina Kamiya	(Japan)	7	i	37.78	21	
13	Margot Boer	(Netherlands)	1	i	37.96	18	
14	Heather McLean	(Canada)	5	i	37.98	16	
15	Marsha Hudey	(Canada)	4	i	38.10	14	
16	Arisa Go	(Japan)	3	i	38.14	12	
17	Yekaterina Aydova	(Kazakhstan)	4	o	38.21	10	
18	Janine Smit	(Netherlands)	1	o	38.33	8	
19	Floor van den Brandt	(Netherlands)	3	o	38.37	6	
20	Nadezhda Aseyeva	(Russia)	2	i	38.41	5	

Note: NR = national record.

=== Division B ===
Rank	Name	Nat.	Pair	Lane	Time	WC points
1	Kim Min-sun	(South Korea)	9	o	38.10	25
2	Marrit Leenstra	(Netherlands)	2	o	38.20	19
3	Li Qishi	(China)	10	i	38.24	15
4	Jang Mi	(South Korea)	8	o	38.54	11
5	Hege Bøkko	(Norway)	7	o	38.58	8
6	Yekaterina Shikhova	(Russia)	6	i	38.59	6
7	Yvonne Daldossi	(Italy)	5	o	38.62	4
8	Gabriele Hirschbichler	(Germany)	8	i	38.64	2
9	Kaylin Irvine	(Canada)	7	i	38.652	1
10	Kim Hyun-yung	(South Korea)	9	i	38.658	—
11	Bo van der Werff	(Netherlands)	10	o	38.67	
12	Elina Risku	(Finland)	4	i	38.79	
13	Park Soo-jin	(South Korea)	4	o	38.86	
14	Jessica Gregg	(Canada)	6	o	38.91	
15	Margarita Ryzhova	(Russia)	3	i	38.94	
16	Zhang Xin	(China)	5	i	39.18	
17	Ksenia Sadovskaya	(Belarus)	3	o	39.24	
18	Paige Schwartzburg	(United States)	2	i	39.25	
19	Roxanne Dufter	(Germany)	1	o	39.44	
20	Kelly Gunther	(United States)	1	i	40.14	

== Race 2 ==
Race two took place on Saturday, November 21, with Division B scheduled at 09:00, and Division A scheduled at 15:06.

=== Division A ===
Rank	Name	Nat.	Pair	Lane	Time	WC points	GWC points
1st place, gold medalist(s)	Zhang Hong	(China)	10	i	36.82	100	50
2nd place, silver medalist(s)	Lee Sang-hwa	(South Korea)	10	o	36.83	80	40
3rd place, bronze medalist(s)	Brittany Bowe	(United States)	9	i	37.08	70	35
4	Heather Richardson-Bergsma	(United States)	9	o	37.23	60	30
5	Yu Jing	(China)	8	i	37.58	50	25
6	Heather McLean	(Canada)	5	i	37.59	45	—
7	Olga Fatkulina	(Russia)	6	o	37.66	40	
8	Maki Tsuji	(Japan)	7	i	37.671	36	
9	Sugar Todd	(United States)	4	i	37.678	32	
10	Erina Kamiya	(Japan)	7	o	37.73	28	
11	Floor van den Brandt	(Netherlands)	1	i	37.76	24	
12	Vanessa Bittner	(Austria)	8	o	37.78	21	
13	Marsha Hudey	(Canada)	4	o	37.85	18	
14	Margot Boer	(Netherlands)	2	i	37.86	16	
15	Kim Min-sun	(South Korea)	2	o	37.873	14	
16	Nao Kodaira	(Japan)	6	i	37.879	12	
17	Karolína Erbanová	(Czech Republic)	5	o	37.89	10	
18	Marrit Leenstra	(Netherlands)	1	o	37.98	8	
19	Arisa Go	(Japan)	3	o	38.04	6	
20	Yekaterina Aydova	(Kazakhstan)	3	i	38.31	5	

=== Division B ===
Rank	Name	Nat.	Pair	Lane	Time	WC points
1	Nadezhda Aseyeva	(Russia)	9	i	38.23	25
2	Kaylin Irvine	(Canada)	6	o	38.45	19
3	Jang Mi	(South Korea)	8	o	38.48	15
4	Yekaterina Shikhova	(Russia)	6	i	38.51	11
5	Zhang Xin	(China)	4	i	38.70	8
6	Yvonne Daldossi	(Italy)	5	i	38.710	6
7	Elina Risku	(Finland)	4	o	38.718	4
8	Kim Hyun-yung	(South Korea)	7	i	38.76	2
9	Hege Bøkko	(Norway)	7	o	38.77	1
10	Jessica Gregg	(Canada)	5	o	38.84	—
11	Janine Smit	(Netherlands)	9	o	39.03	
12	Park Soo-jin	(South Korea)	3	i	39.21	
13	Paige Schwartzburg	(United States)	2	o	39.27	
14	Ksenia Sadovskaya	(Belarus)	2	i	39.37	
15	Bo van der Werff	(Netherlands)	8	i	39.38	
16	Margarita Ryzhova	(Russia)	3	o	39.56	
17	Francesca Bettrone	(Italy)	1	o	40.06	
18	Kelly Gunther	(United States)	1	i	40.14	
