= 2015–16 ISU Speed Skating World Cup – Women's 500 metres =

The 500 meters distance for women in the 2015–16 ISU Speed Skating World Cup will be contested over 12 races on six occasions, out of a total of World Cup occasions for the season, with the first occasion taking place in Calgary, Alberta, Canada, on 13–15 November 2015, and the final occasion taking place in Heerenveen, Netherlands, on 11–13 March 2016.

The defending champion is Nao Kodaira of Japan.

== Top three ==
Position	Athlete	Points	Previous season

== Race medallists ==
WC #	Location	Date	Gold	Time	Silver	Time	Bronze	Time	Report
1	Calgary, Canada	13 November	Lee Sang-hwa; South Korea	36.96	Zhang Hong; China	37.18	Brittany Bowe; United States	37.22	
1	Calgary, Canada	15 November	Zhang Hong; China	36.94	Lee Sang-hwa; South Korea	36.99	Heather Richardson-Bergsma; United States	37.06	
2	Salt Lake City, United States	20 November	Zhang Hong; China	36.56	Brittany Bowe; United States	37.03	Heather Richardson-Bergsma; United States	37.13	
2	Salt Lake City, United States	21 November	Zhang Hong; China	36.82	Lee Sang-hwa; South Korea	36.83	Brittany Bowe; United States	37.08	
3	Inzell, Germany	4 December	Lee Sang-hwa; South Korea	37.33	Brittany Bowe; United States	37.70	Heather Richardson-Bergsma; United States	38.00	
3	Inzell, Germany	6 December	Lee Sang-hwa; South Korea	37.36	Heather Richardson-Bergsma; United States	37.84	Heather McLean; Canada	38.02	
4	Heerenveen, Netherlands	11 December	Lee Sang-hwa; South Korea	37.59	Brittany Bowe; United States	37.86	Heather Richardson-Bergsma; United States	37.93	
4	Heerenveen, Netherlands	13 December	Yu Jing; China	37.84	Heather Richardson-Bergsma; United States	37.87	Zhang Hong; China	37.90	
5	Stavanger, Norway	29 January	Zhang Hong; China	37.82	Yu Jing; China	37.93	Jorien ter Mors; Netherlands	37.99	
5	Stavanger, Norway	30 January	Yu Jing; China	37.63	Zhang Hong; China	37.82	Heather McLean; Canada	38.02	
6	Heerenveen, Netherlands	11 March	Brittany Bowe; United States	37.84	Heather Richardson-Bergsma; United States	38.02	Jorien ter Mors; Netherlands	38.20	
6	Heerenveen, Netherlands	12 March	Brittany Bowe; United States	37.64	Heather Richardson-Bergsma; United States	37.88	Heather McLean; Canada	38.07	

== Standings ==
Standings as of 30 January 2016.

#	Name	Nat.	CGY1	CGY2	SLC1	SLC2	INZ1	INZ2	HVN1	HVN2	STA1	STA2	HVN3	HVN4	Total
1	Zhang Hong	(China)	80	100	100	100	—	—	60	70	100	80			690
2	Lee Sang-hwa	(South Korea)	100	80	60	80	100	100	100	60	—	—			680
3	Heather Richardson-Bergsma	(United States)	60	70	70	60	70	80	70	80	24	24			608
4	Yu Jing	(China)	45	50	50	50	—	—	36	100	80	100			511
5	Brittany Bowe	(United States)	70	60	80	70	80	—	80	—	45	—			485
6	Vanessa Bittner	(Austria)	50	36	45	21	50	50	45	40	60	40			437
7	Heather McLean	(Canada)	19	28	16	45	60	70	32	28	50	70			418
8	Olga Fatkulina	(Russia)	28	21	32	40	45	18	50	45	40	60			379
9	Erina Kamiya	(Japan)	36	40	21	28	36	60	21	18	18	32			310
10	Nao Kodaira	(Japan)	24	24	40	12	40	12	18	36	36	45			287
11	Karolína Erbanová	(Czech Republic)	21	18	24	10	32	28	40	32	28	50			283
12	Maki Tsuji	(Japan)	40	32	28	36	24	36	16	24	12	21			269
13	Jorien ter Mors	(Netherlands)	32	45	—	—	—	—	24	50	70	—			221
14	Marsha Hudey	(Canada)	25	10	14	18	18	45	12	12	21	36			211
15	Sugar Todd	(United States)	11	14	36	32	21	32	14	21	6	6			193
16	Margot Boer	(Netherlands)	14	8	18	16	16	16	28	14	32	18			180
17	Kim Min-sun	(South Korea)	8	6	25	14	28	40	10	16	10	5			162
18	Yekaterina Aydova	(Kazakhstan)	8	25	10	5	12	14	19	10	14	14			131
19	Nadezhda Aseyeva	(Russia)	12	16	5	25	6	5	6	15	8	28			126
20	Floor van den Brandt	(Netherlands)	10	19	6	24	14	21	8	5	5	8			120
21	Janine Smit	(Netherlands)	6	15	8	0	25	10	4	19	16	12			115
22	Li Qishi	(China)	15	6	15	—	5	—	11	—	11	25			88
23	Yekaterina Shikhova	(Russia)	1	1	6	11	19	—	25	8	1	16			88
24	Arisa Go	(Japan)	18	12	12	6	8	8	15	6	—	—			85
25	Kim Hyun-yung	(South Korea)	6	8	0	2	6	25	6	11	6	6			76
26	Marrit Leenstra	(Netherlands)	—	—	19	8	11	24	8	—	—	—			70
27	Kaylin Irvine	(Canada)	4	0	1	19	10	6	2	8	2	11			63
28	Yvonne Daldossi	(Italy)	0	0	4	6	4	19	5	1	0	8			47
29	Li Huawei	(China)	—	—	—	—	8	8	1	25	—	—			42
30	Shannon Rempel	(Canada)	4	11	—	—	—	—	—	—	8	19			42
31	Hege Bøkko	(Norway)	0	2	8	1	0	11	—	4	0	15			41
32	Jang Mi	(South Korea)	0	4	11	15	—	—	—	—	—	—			30
33	Zhang Xin	(China)	0	0	0	8	6	15	0	0	—	—			29
34	Miho Takagi	(Japan)	—	—	—	—	—	—	—	—	25	—			25
35	Anice Das	(Netherlands)	—	—	—	—	—	—	—	—	15	10			25
36	Bo van der Werff	(Netherlands)	16	5	0	0	0	—	—	—	—	—			21
37	Misaki Oshigiri	(Japan)	—	—	—	—	—	—	—	—	19	—			19
38	Letitia de Jong	(Netherlands)	—	—	—	—	15	—	—	—	—	—			15
39	Gabriele Hirschbichler	(Germany)	5	—	2	—	—	—	—	—	4	—			11
40	Elina Risku	(Finland)	0	0	0	4	2	1	0	2	0	0			9
41	Yuliya Kozyreva	(Russia)	—	—	—	—	0	0	0	6	—	—			6
42	Anastasia Bucsis	(Canada)	—	—	—	—	—	—	—	—	0	4			4
43	Park Soo-jin	(South Korea)	0	0	0	0	0	4	0	0	—	—			4
44	Martine Ripsrud	(Norway)	—	—	—	—	—	—	—	0	0	2			2
45	Paige Schwartzburg	(United States)	0	0	0	0	0	2	0	—	0	0			2
46	Mayon Kuipers	(Netherlands)	—	—	—	—	—	—	—	—	—	1			1
47	Kali Christ	(Canada)	—	—	—	—	1	—	—	—	—	—			1
