= List of Estonian records in speed skating =

The following are the national records in speed skating in Estonia maintained by the Estonian Skating Union.

== Men ==
Event	Record	Athlete	Date	Meet	Place	Ref
500 meters	34.12	Marten Liiv	15 November 2025	World Cup	Salt Lake City, United States	
500 meters × 2	71.06	Marten Liiv	27 December 2020	Dutch Qualification Tournament	Heerenveen, Netherlands	
1000 meters	1:06.73	Marten Liiv	14 November 2025	World Cup	Salt Lake City, United States	
1500 meters	1:44.51	Marten Liiv	15 November 2025	World Cup	Salt Lake City, United States	
3000 meters	3:55.51	Marten Liiv	8 October 2016		Inzell, Germany	
5000 meters	6:55.21	Marten Liiv	12 March 2016	World Junior Championships	Changchun, China	
10000 meters	15:03.39	Mart Markus	14 March 2024		Heerenveen, Netherlands	
Team pursuit (8 laps)	4:28.47	Marten Liiv; Risto Liiv; Aleks Luik	13 November 2011	Junior World Cup	Erfurt, Germany	
Sprint combination	138.050 pts	Marten Liiv	7–8 March 2024	World Sprint Championships	Inzell, Germany	
Small combination	169.412 pts	Aleks Luik	15–16 December 2012	Tatra Cup	Zakopane, Poland	
Big combination	177.595 pts	Joonas Valge	25–26 February 2023	Estonian Allround Championships	Tallinn, Estonia	

== Women ==
Event	Record	Athlete	Date	Meet	Place	Ref
500 meters	40.30	Saskia Kütt	30 October 2026		Inzell, Germany	
500 meters × 2						
1000 meters	1:19.01	Saskia Alusalu	16 March 2019	Olympic Oval Finale	Calgary, Canada	
1500 meters	1:58.64	Saskia Alusalu	17 March 2019	Olympic Oval Finale	Calgary, Canada	
3000 meters	4:07.43	Saskia Alusalu	13 October 2019	International Season Opening	Inzell, Germany	
5000 meters	7:19.14	Saskia Alusalu	30 September 2017	International Race	Inzell, Germany	
10000 meters						
Team pursuit (6 laps)						
Sprint combination	175.365 pts	Kristiine Kalev	11–12 March 2017	Belarus Open Sprint Championships	Minsk, Belarus	
Mini combination	178.553 pts	Saskia Alusalu	18–19 March 2011	Viking Race	Heerenveen, Netherlands	
Small combination	198.637 pts	Saskia Alusalu	18–19 December 2010		Helsinki, Finland	

== Mixed ==
Event	Record	Athlete	Date	Meet	Place	Ref
Relay	3:14.13	Saskia Kütt; Uku Märten Vaikmaa	1 March 2026	World Junior Championships	Inzell, Germany	
