= 2015–16 ISU Speed Skating World Cup – World Cup 2 – Women's team sprint =

Women's world cup speed skating 2015-16

The women's team sprint race of the 2015–16 ISU Speed Skating World Cup 2, arranged in the Utah Olympic Oval, in Salt Lake City, United States, was held on November 22, 2015.

The Chinese team won the race on a new world record, while the Russian team came second, and the Japanese team came third. All three teams beat the old record, which was held by the Japanese team, and established only the previous weekend.

== Results ==
The race took place on Sunday, November 22, in the afternoon session, scheduled at 15:30.

Rank	Country	Skaters	Pair	Lane	Time	WC points
1st place, gold medalist(s)	China	Yu Jing; Zhang Hong; Li Qishi	4	c	1:24.65 WR	100
2nd place, silver medalist(s)	Russia	Yekaterina Shikhova; Nadezhda Aseyeva; Olga Fatkulina	2	c	1:26.07 NR	80
3rd place, bronze medalist(s)	Japan	Erina Kamiya; Maki Tsuji; Nao Kodaira	4	f	1:26.62 NR	70
4	Canada	Marsha Hudey; Kaylin Irvine; Heather McLean	3	f	1:26.84 NR	60
5	Netherlands	Janine Smit; Margot Boer; Lotte van Beek	3	c	1:27.11 NR	50
6	South Korea	Kim Min-sun; Kim Hyun-yung; Jang Mi	1	f	1:27.45 NR	45
7	Belarus	Ksenia Sadovskaya; Tatyana Mikhailova; Marina Zueva	2	f	1:29.77	40

Note: WR = world record, NR = national record.
