= 2015–16 ISU Speed Skating World Cup – World Cup 2 – Men's 1000 metres =

The men's 1000 metres race of the 2015–16 ISU Speed Skating World Cup 2, arranged in the Utah Olympic Oval, in Salt Lake City, United States, was held on November 21, 2015.

Pavel Kulizhnikov of Russia won the race, while Kjeld Nuis of the Netherlands came second, and Gerben Jorritsma of the Netherlands came third. Denis Yuskov of Russia won the Division B race.

== Results ==
The race took place on Saturday, November 21, with Division B scheduled in the morning session, at 09:26, and Division A scheduled in the afternoon session, at 15:31.

=== Division A ===
Rank	Name	Nat.	Pair	Lane	Time	WC points	GWC points
1st place, gold medalist(s)	Pavel Kulizhnikov	(Russia)	10	o	1:06.70 NR	100	100
2nd place, silver medalist(s)	Kjeld Nuis	(Netherlands)	9	i	1:07.02	80	80
3rd place, bronze medalist(s)	Gerben Jorritsma	(Netherlands)	10	i	1:07.23	70	70
4	Shani Davis	(United States)	8	i	1:07.37	60	60
5	Vincent De Haître	(Canada)	7	o	1:07.450	50	50
6	Kai Verbij	(Netherlands)	7	i	1:07.453	45	—
7	Joey Mantia	(United States)	9	o	1:07.47	40	
8	Mika Poutala	(Finland)	5	i	1:07.63	36	
9	Aleksey Yesin	(Russia)	8	o	1:07.73	32	
10	Thomas Krol	(Netherlands)	3	i	1:07.79	28	
11	Mitchell Whitmore	(United States)	4	o	1:07.83	24	
12	Alexandre St-Jean	(Canada)	3	o	1:07.89	21	
13	Alex Boisvert-Lacroix	(Canada)	2	o	1:07.97	18	
14	Roman Krech	(Kazakhstan)	2	i	1:08.21	16	
15	Kirill Golubev	(Russia)	5	o	1:08.35	14	
16	Espen Aarnes Hvammen	(Norway)	1	i	1:08.37	12	
17	Kim Jin-su	(South Korea)	1	o	1:08.42	10	
18	Li Bailin	(China)	4	i	1:08.61	8	
19	Piotr Michalski	(Poland)	6	o	1:09.13	6	
20	Denis Kuzin	(Kazakhstan)	6	i	1:09.16	5	

Note: NR = national record.

=== Division B ===
Rank	Name	Nat.	Pair	Lane	Time	WC points
1	Denis Yuskov	(Russia)	4	i	1:08.07	25
2	Kim Tae-yun	(South Korea)	6	i	1:08.32	19
3	Jonathan Garcia	(United States)	14	o	1:08.61	15
4	Jang Won-hoon	(South Korea)	16	i	1:08.63	11
5	Stefan Groothuis	(Netherlands)	6	o	1:08.70	8
6	Kimani Griffin	(United States)	5	o	1:08.98	6
7	Hubert Hirschbichler	(Germany)	15	i	1:09.02	4
8	Gilmore Junio	(Canada)	5	i	1:09.04	2
9	Taro Kondo	(Japan)	2	o	1:09.08	1
10	Yang Fan	(China)	16	o	1:09.25	—
11	Jan Szymański	(Poland)	3	o	1:09.34	
12	Xie Jiaxuan	(China)	13	i	1:09.363	
13	Mirko Giacomo Nenzi	(Italy)	11	o	1:09.364	
14	Pekka Koskela	(Finland)	3	i	1:09.40	
15	Konrád Nagy	(Hungary)	12	o	1:09.51 NR	
16	Haralds Silovs	(Latvia)	12	i	1:09.63	
17	Kim Jun-ho	(South Korea)	8	i	1:09.78	
18	Joel Dufter	(Germany)	17	o	1:09:81	
19	Tian Guojun	(China)	13	o	1:09.88	
20	Fyodor Mezentsev	(Kazakhstan)	2	i	1:09.93	
21	Vitaly Mikhailov	(Belarus)	10	o	1:09.97 NR	
22	Tsukasa Owada	(Japan)	11	i	1:10.04	
23	Daniel Greig	(Australia)	9	i	1:10.08	
24	Zbigniew Bródka	(Poland)	4	o	1:10.11	
25	David Bosa	(Italy)	10	i	1:10.21	
26	Jan Daldossi	(Italy)	1	i	1:10.50	
27	Mathias Vosté	(Belgium)	8	o	1:10.70	
28	Christian Oberbichler	(Switzerland)	7	i	1:10.90 NR	
29	Juho Vaittinen	(Finland)	7	o	1:11.06	
30	Pedro Causil	(Colombia)	9	o	1:11.31	
31	David Andersson	(Sweden)	14	i	DQ	
31	Nico Ihle	(Germany)	17	i	DQ	
31	Konrad Niedźwiedzki	(Poland)	15	o	DQ	

Note: NR = national record.
