= List of Estonian records in track cycling =

The following are the national records in track cycling in Estonia maintained by Estonia's national cycling federation: Estonian Cycling Federation.

== Men ==
| Event | Record | Athlete | Date | Meet | Place | Ref |
|---|---|---|---|---|---|---|
| Flying 200 m time trial | 10.221 | Urmo Valter | 1990 | | Moscow, Soviet Union | |
| Flying 500 m time trial | 28.330 | Urmo Valter | 1987 | | Moscow, Soviet Union | |
| 1 km time trial | 1:05.061 | Daniel Novikov | 3 September 2008 | European U23 Championships | Pruszków, Poland | |
| 4000m individual pursuit | 4:37.232 | Juri Beljakov | 1985 | | Moscow, Soviet Union | |
| 4000m team pursuit | 4:24.550 | Urmas Tölp; Eduard Beljakov; Mark Revjagin; Veikko Kiisk | 1990 | | Moscow, Soviet Union | |

== Women ==
| Event | Record | Athlete | Date | Meet | Place | Ref |
|---|---|---|---|---|---|---|
| Flying 200 m time trial | 11.050 | Erika Salumäe | 1995 | World Cup | Quito, Ecuador | |
| Flying 500 m time trial | 29.655 | Erika Salumäe | 6 August 1987 | | Moscow, Soviet Union | |
| 500 m time trial | 35.151 | Erika Salumäe | 1995 | World Cup | Quito, Ecuador | |
| 3000m individual pursuit | 3:54.537 | Erika Salumäe | 1985 | | Moscow, Soviet Union | |
| 3000m team pursuit | | | | | | |
