= Marten Liiv =

Estonian speed skater (born 1996)

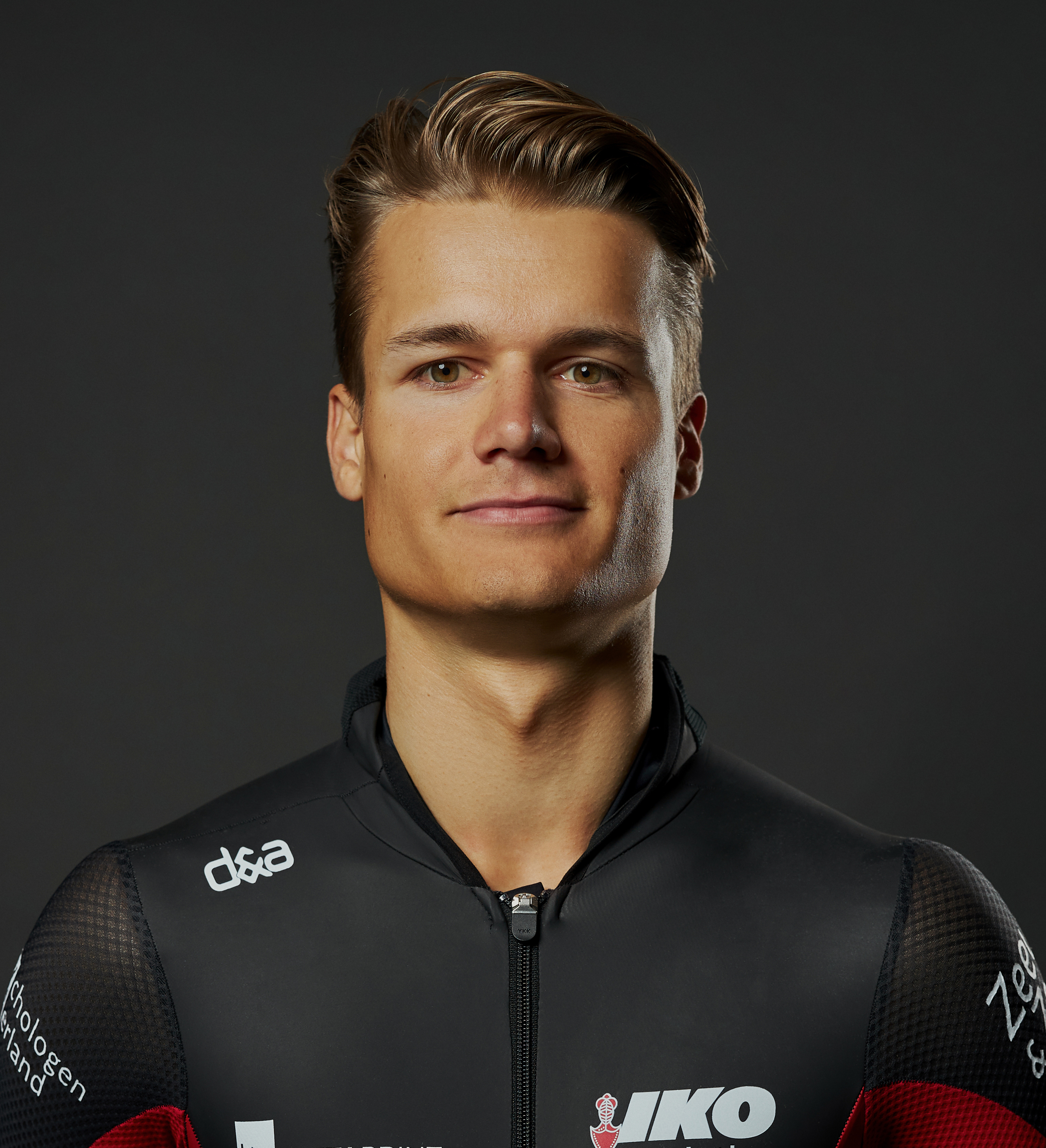
- Liiv in 2022

Personal information
- Born: 23 December 1996 (age 29) Jõgeva, Estonia
- Height: 1.80 m (5 ft 11 in)

Sport
- Country: Estonia
- Sport: Speed skating
Medal record
Men's speed skating
Representing Estonia
European Championships
Silver medal – second place	2024 Heerenveen	500 m
Bronze medal – third place	2023 Hamar	Sprint
Bronze medal – third place	2026 Tomaszów Mazowiecki	1000 m
World Junior Championships
Bronze medal – third place	2016 Changchun	1000 m

Marten Liiv (born 23 December 1996) is an Estonian speed skater. Liiv represented Estonia at the 2018, 2022 and 2026 Winter Olympics.

He won a bronze medal at the 2016 World Junior Speed Skating Championships in 1000 m event.

He also holds several national records.

== Records ==
=== Personal records ===
Personal records
Speed skating
Event	Result	Date	Location	Notes
500 m	34.12	15 November 2025	Salt Lake City	Current Estonian record
1000 m	1:06.73	15 November 2025	Salt Lake City	Current Estonian record
1500 m	1:46.11	11 December 2021	Calgary	Current Estonian record
3000 m	3:55.51	6 October 2016	Inzell	Current Estonian record
5000 m	6:55.21	12 March 2016	Changchun	Current Estonian record
10000 m	15:18.26	23 November 2014	Minsk	
