= Mart Markus =

Estonian speed skater and coach (born 1990)

Mart Markus (born 2 July 1990) is an Estonian speed skater and coach.

He was born in Adavere. In 2014 he graduated from Tallinn University's Institute of Health and Sport.

He started his skating exercising in 2006, coached by Väino Treiman. 2009-2021 he won many times Estonian championships in different disciplines. 2006-2014 he was a member of Estonian national speed skating team.

Since 2015 he is coaching at Tondiraba Ice Hall.

Records:

- 500 m 38,54 (2012)
- 1000 m 1.16,05 (2012)
- 1500 m 1.55,83 (2012)
- 3000 m 4.07,01 (2013)
- 5000 m 7.12,14 (2013)
- 10 000 m 15.14,28 (2012, current Estonian national record).
