= Tormod Bjørnetun Haugen =

Tormod Bjørnetun Haugen (Norwegian: [ˈtʊ̂rmʊd ˈbjø̂ːɳətʉːn ˈhæ̀ʉɡn̩]; born 28 October 1988) is a Norwegian speed skater and inline skater representing Sandefjord SK. Haugen has participated in World Championships in inline skating, and has been selected to make his debut at the 2012–13 ice speed skating World Cup series starting in Heerenveen on 16 November. Haugen won his first national medals at the 2012 Norwegian Single Distance Championships in Bjugn, taking bronze medals on 5000m and 10,000m. His cousins August Teodor Haugen and Sofie Karoline Haugen are also active speed skaters for Sandefjord SK.
