= World record progression 1500 m speed skating women =

The world record progression 1500 m speed skating women as recognised by the International Skating Union:

Name	Result	Date	Venue	
(Poland) Zofia Nehringowa	3:28.0	27 January 1929	Warsaw	
(Poland) Zofia Nehringowa	3:10.4	10 January 1932	Davos	
(Norway) Synnøve Lie	3:08.1	7 March 1932	Oslo	
(Finland) Verné Lesche	2:49.0	26 February 1933	Helsinki	
(Norway) Undis Blikken	2:40.0	12 February 1934	Oslo	
(Norway) Laila Schou Nilsen	2:38.1	23 January 1937	Oslo	
(Norway) Randi Thorvaldsen	2:37.5	25 February 1950	Gjøvik	
(Soviet Union) Rimma Zhukova	2:36.7	17 March 1950	Kirov	
(Soviet Union) Maria Isakova	2:29.5	12 February 1951	Medeo	
(Soviet Union) Khalida Shchegoleyeva	2:25.5	30 January 1953	Medeo	
(Soviet Union) Lidiya Skoblikova	2:25.2	12 February 1960	Squaw Valley	
(Soviet Union) Inga Artamonova	2:19.0	27 January 1962	Medeo	
(Netherlands) Ans Schut	2:18.5	22 February 1969	Inzell	
(Soviet Union) Nina Statkevich	2:17.8	17 January 1970	Medeo	
(Netherlands) Atje Keulen-Deelstra	2:17.2	14 March 1970	Inzell	
(Netherlands) Stien Kaiser	2:15.8	15 January 1971	Davos	
(Soviet Union) Tatyana Averina	2:14.00	1 April 1974	Medeo	
(Soviet Union) Tatyana Averina	2:09.90	11 March 1975	Medeo	
(Soviet Union) Khalida Vorobyeva	2:07.18	10 April 1978	Medeo	
(Soviet Union) Natalya Petrusyova	2:06.01	3 January 1981	Medeo	
(Soviet Union) Natalya Petrusyova	2:05.39	27 March 1981	Medeo	
(Soviet Union) Natalya Petrusyova	2:04.04	25 March 1983	Medeo	
(East Germany) Karin Enke	2:03.42	9 February 1984	Sarajevo	
(East Germany) Andrea Schöne	2:03.34	24 March 1984	Medeo	
(East Germany) Karin Kania	2:02.23	6 March 1986	Inzell	
(East Germany) Karin Kania	1:59.30	22 March 1986	Medeo	
(Canada) Catriona Le May Doan	1:57.87	29 November 1997	Calgary	
(Netherlands) Marianne Timmer	1:57.58	16 February 1998	Nagano	
(Germany) Anni Friesinger	1:56.95	29 March 1998	Calgary	
(Netherlands) Annamarie Thomas	1:55.50	20 March 1999	Calgary	
(Germany) Anni Friesinger	1:54.38	4 March 2001	Calgary	
(Germany) Anni Friesinger	1:54.02	20 February 2002	Salt Lake City	OG 2002
(Canada) Cindy Klassen	1:53.87	9 January 2005	Salt Lake City	
(Canada) Cindy Klassen	1:53.77	28 October 2005	Calgary	
(Germany) Anni Friesinger	1:53.22	6 November 2005	Calgary	
(Canada) Cindy Klassen	1:51.79	20 November 2005	Salt Lake City	
(United States) Brittany Bowe	1:51.59	15 November 2015	Calgary	World Cup
(United States) Heather Richardson-Bergsma	1:50.85	21 November 2015	Salt Lake City	World Cup
(Japan) Miho Takagi	1:49.84	10 March 2019	Salt Lake City	World Cup
