= Saskia Alusalu =

Estonian speed skater (born 1994)

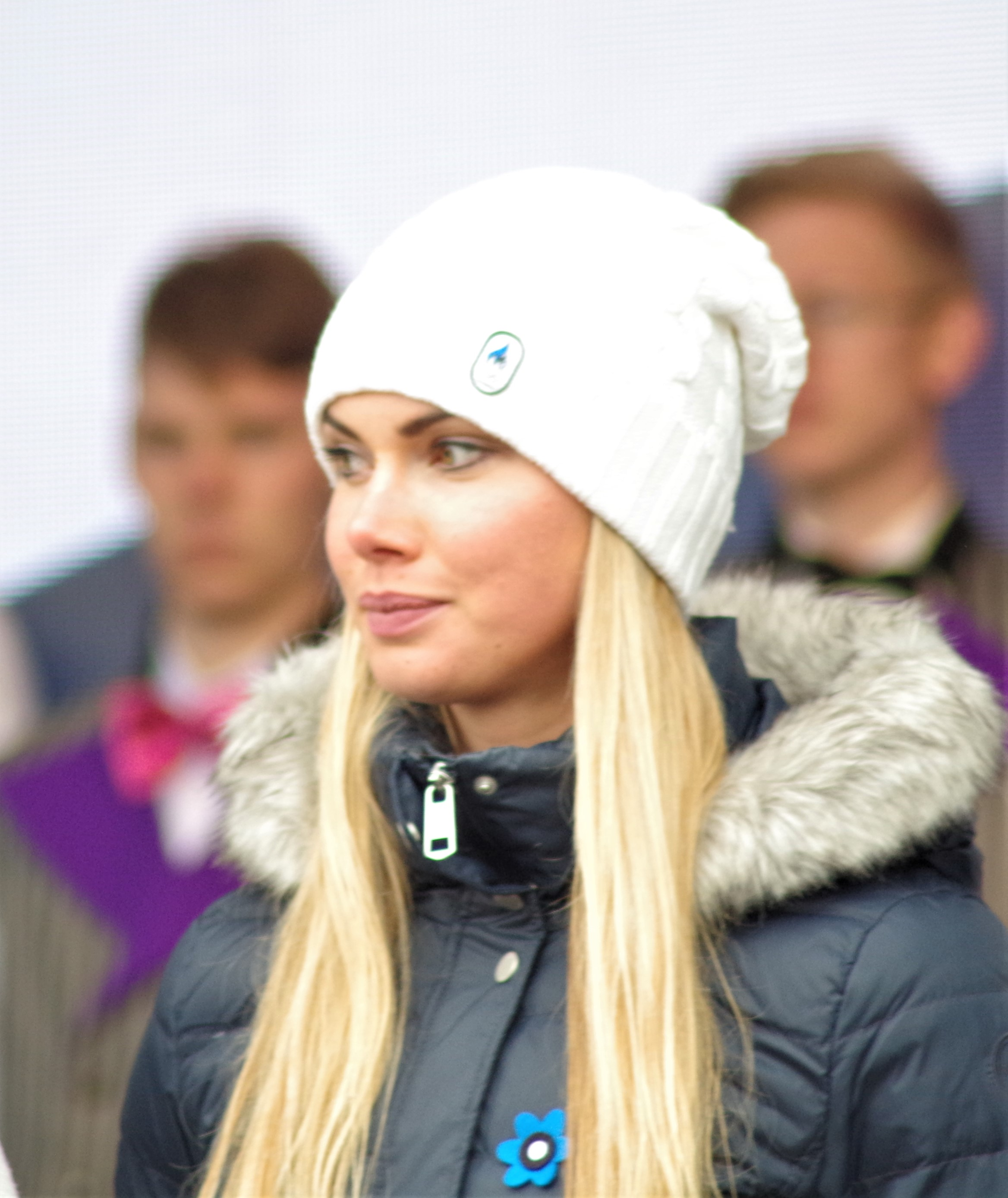
- Alusalu in 2018

Personal information
- Born: 14 April 1994 (age 31) Jõgeva, Estonia
- Height: 1.76 m (5 ft 9 in)

Sport
- Country: Estonia
- Sport: Speed skating

Saskia Alusalu (born 14 April 1994) is an Estonian speed skater. Alusalu represented Estonia at the 2018 Winter Olympics in Pyeongchang.

In the 2017/18 World Cup in Calgary, Alusalu achieved by far her best World Cup result to date when she placed fourth in the mass start. She attacked early and broke away from the field until three other athletes around the eventual winner Claudia Pechstein caught up with her and finally overtook her.

Alusalu was Estonias's flag bearer at the 2018 Winter Olympics.

She holds several national records.

In August 2021, despite already training for the 2022 Beijing Winter Olympics, she announced that she was ending her career as a speed skater because she wanted to focus more on her personal life and felt she could no longer handle the physical stresses. In addition to her current physiotherapy studies at the University of Tartu, she has obtained a coaching diploma to work as such in the future.

Winter Olympics
Preceded by Indrek Tobreluts	Flagbearer for Estonia; PyeongChang 2018	Succeeded by
Awards
Preceded by Julia Beljajeva	Estonian Athlete of the Year; 2018	Succeeded by Kelly Sildaru
