= Francesca Bettrone =

Italian speed skater

Personal information
- Born: 5 August 1991 (age 34) Venice, Italy
- Height: 1.64 m (5 ft 5 in)
- Weight: 59 kg (130 lb)

Sport
- Country: Italy
- Sport: Speed skating
- Turned pro: 2011

Francesca Bettrone (born 5 August 1991) is an Italian speed skater who competed in the 2015–16 ISU Speed Skating World Cup, the 2016–17 ISU Speed Skating World Cup and the 2017 European Speed Skating Championships.

== Personal records ==
Personal records
Women's speed skating
Event	Result	Date	Location	Notes
500 m	38.24	26 February 2017	Olympic Oval, Calgary	
1000 m	1:15.70	26 February 2017	Olympic Oval, Calgary	
1500 m	1:57.64	7 November 2015	Olympic Oval, Calgary	
3000 m	4:10.24	13 November 2015	Olympic Oval, Calgary	
5000 m	7:29.29	20 November 2015	Utah Olympic Oval, Salt Lake City	
