= Liu Jing (speed skater) =

Chinese speed skater

Personal information
- Born: 30 May 1988 (age 37) Qiqihar, Heilongjiang, China
- Height: 165 cm (5 ft 5 in)
- Weight: 58 kg (128 lb)

Sport
- Country: China
- Sport: Speed skating

Liu Jing
- Simplified Chinese: 刘晶
- Traditional Chinese: 劉晶
Transcriptions
Standard Mandarin
- Hanyu Pinyin: Liú Jīng
- IPA: [ljǒʊ tɕíŋ]

Liu Jing (Chinese: 刘晶; pinyin: Liú Jīng; Mandarin pronunciation: [ljǒʊ tɕíŋ]; born 30 May 1988) is a Chinese speed skater. She competed in the women's 3000 metres at the 2018 Winter Olympics.
