= Misaki Oshigiri =

Japanese speed skater (born 1992)

Personal information
- Born: 29 September 1992 (age 33) Nakasatsunai, Japan
- Height: 5 ft 6 in (168 cm)
- Weight: 132 lb (60 kg)

Sport
- Country: Japan
- Sport: Speed skating

Achievements and titles
- Highest world ranking: 38 (1500 m)
Medal record
World Championships
Silver medal – second place	2016 Kolomna	Team pursuit
Silver medal – second place	2017 Gangneung	Team pursuit

Misaki Oshigiri (押切 美沙紀) (born 29 September 1992) is a Japanese speed skater.

Oshigiri competed at the 2014 Winter Olympics for Japan. In the 1500 metres she placed 22nd. She was also part of the Japanese team pursuit squad, which won their semi-final, before losing to the Netherlands in the semi-final and to Russia in the bronze medal final, ending up 4th overall.

Oshigiri has won a pair of silver medals at the World Junior Speed Skating Championships, in two team pursuit events.

Oshigiri made her World Cup debut in November 2012. As of December 2014, Oshigiri's top World Cup finish is 17th in a 1500 m race. Her best overall finish in the World Cup is 38th, in the 1500 m World Cup of 2012–13.
