= 2018 World Sprint Speed Skating Championships – Men =

Men at the 2018 World Allround Sprint Skating Championships
- Venue: Jilin Provincial Speed Skating Rink
- Location: Changchun, China
- Dates: 3–4 March
- Competitors: 23 from 13 nations
- Winning points: 139.360

Medalists
gold medal	Håvard Holmefjord Lorentzen	Norway
silver medal	Kjeld Nuis	Netherlands
bronze medal	Kai Verbij	Netherlands

The Men competition at the 2018 World Sprint Speed Skating Championships was held on 3 and 4 March 2018.

== Results ==
=== 500 m ===
The race was started on 3 March at 17:52.

Rank	Pair	Lane	Name	Country	Time	Diff
1	6	O	Håvard Holmefjord Lorentzen	Norway	34.89	
2	10	O	Daichi Yamanaka	Japan	34.92	+0.03
3	11	O	Gao Tingyu	China	34.94	+0.05
4	11	I	Ronald Mulder	Netherlands	34.98	+0.09
5	10	I	Mika Poutala	Finland	35.00	+0.11
5	9	I	Mitchell Whitmore	United States	35.00	+0.11
7	5	O	Piotr Michalski	Poland	35.03	+0.14
7	12	O	Kai Verbij	Netherlands	35.03	+0.14
9	9	O	Nico Ihle	Germany	35.04	+0.15
10	5	I	Laurent Dubreuil	Canada	35.07	+0.18
11	12	I	Cha Min-kyu	South Korea	35.19	+0.30
12	3	I	Kjeld Nuis	Netherlands	35.21	+0.32
13	6	I	Tsubasa Hasegawa	Japan	35.22	+0.33
14	8	O	Aleksey Yesin	Russia	35.32	+0.43
15	2	I	Daniel Greig	Australia	35.34	+0.45
16	7	O	Henrik Fagerli Rukke	Norway	35.36	+0.47
17	7	I	Yang Tao	China	35.55	+0.66
18	8	I	Jonathan Garcia	United States	35.59	+0.70
19	3	O	Johann Jørgen Sæves	Norway	35.60	+0.71
20	4	O	Joel Dufter	Germany	35.68	+0.79
21	4	I	Sebastian Kłosiński	Poland	35.73	+0.84
22	1	I	Mikhail Kozlov	Russia	35.77	+0.88
23	2	O	Cornelius Kersten	Great Britain	36.46	+1.57

=== 1000 m ===
The race was started on 3 March at 19:38.

Rank	Pair	Lane	Name	Country	Time	Diff
1	10	O	Kjeld Nuis	Netherlands	1:08.97	
2	12	O	Håvard Holmefjord Lorentzen	Norway	1:09.21	+0.24
3	11	O	Kai Verbij	Netherlands	1:09.22	+0.25
4	6	I	Sebastian Kłosiński	Poland	1:09.71	+0.74
5	9	O	Nico Ihle	Germany	1:09.73	+0.76
6	12	I	Mika Poutala	Finland	1:09.82	+0.85
7	7	O	Mitchell Whitmore	United States	1:09.95	+0.98
8	7	I	Cha Min-kyu	South Korea	1:10.29	+1.06
9	8	I	Piotr Michalski	Poland	1:10.03	+1.17
10	11	I	Aleksey Yesin	Russia	1:10.14	+1.32
11	5	O	Ronald Mulder	Netherlands	1:10.33	+1.36
12	2	I	Mikhail Kozlov	Russia	1:10.52	+1.55
13	6	O	Henrik Fagerli Rukke	Norway	1:10.84	+1.87
14	3	I	Daichi Yamanaka	Japan	1:10.85	+1.88
15	2	O	Johann Jørgen Sæves	Norway	1:10.97	+2.00
16	9	I	Jonathan Garcia	United States	1:11.03	+2.06
17	8	O	Laurent Dubreuil	Canada	1:11.04	+2.07
18	10	I	Daniel Greig	Australia	1:11.07	+2.10
19	3	O	Tsubasa Hasegawa	Japan	1:11.57	+2.59
20	4	I	Cornelius Kersten	Great Britain	1:11.97	+3.00
21	4	O	Yang Tao	China	1:11.99	+3.02
22	1	I	Gao Tingyu	China	1:13.97	+5.00
–	5	I	Joel Dufter	Germany	DSQ	

=== 500 m ===
The race was started on 4 March at 16:50.

Rank	Pair	Lane	Name	Country	Time	Diff
1	12	I	Håvard Holmefjord Lorentzen	Norway	34.96	
2	6	O	Laurent Dubreuil	Canada	34.99	+0.03
3	9	O	Ronald Mulder	Netherlands	35.04	+0.08
4	10	O	Mitchell Whitmore	United States	35.06	+0.10
5	11	O	Mika Poutala	Finland	35.10	+0.14
5	8	I	Daichi Yamanaka	Japan	35.10	+0.14
7	10	I	Nico Ihle	Germany	35.11	+0.15
8	4	I	Gao Tingyu	China	35.12	+0.16
9	7	I	Aleksey Yesin	Russia	35.15	+0.19
9	9	I	Piotr Michalski	Poland	35.15	+0.19
11	11	I	Kai Verbij	Netherlands	35.16	+0.20
12	5	I	Johann Jørgen Sæves	Norway	35.23	+0.27
12	4	O	Tsubasa Hasegawa	Japan	35.23	+0.27
14	12	O	Kjeld Nuis	Netherlands	35.26	+0.30
15	8	O	Cha Min-kyu	South Korea	35.27	+0.31
16	6	I	Henrik Fagerli Rukke	Norway	35.43	+0.47
17	5	O	Daniel Greig	Australia	35.46	+0.50
18	7	O	Sebastian Kłosiński	Poland	35.55	+0.60
19	2	O	Jonathan Garcia	United States	35.72	+0.76
20	3	O	Mikhail Kozlov	Russia	35.73	+0.77
21	3	I	Cornelius Kersten	Great Britain	36.47	+1.51
22	2	I	Joel Dufter	Germany	36.59	+1.63
–	1	O	Yang Tao	China	WDR	

=== 1000 m ===
The race was started on 3 March at 18:42.

Rank	Pair	Lane	Name	Country	Time	Diff
1	8	I	Kjeld Nuis	Netherlands	1:09.11	
2	7	I	Nico Ihle	Germany	1:09.29	+0.18
3	9	I	Kai Verbij	Netherlands	1:09.47	+0.36
4	10	I	Håvard Holmefjord Lorentzen	Norway	1:09.81	+0.70
5	10	O	Mika Poutala	Finland	1:09.87	+0.76
6	3	O	Mikhail Kozlov	Russia	1:10.00	+0.89
7	9	O	Piotr Michalski	Poland	1:10.07	+0.96
8	6	I	Mitchell Whitmore	United States	1:10.10	+0.99
9	5	O	Sebastian Kłosiński	Poland	1:10.25	+1.14
10	7	O	Aleksey Yesin	Russia	1:10.32	+1.21
11	6	O	Cha Min-kyu	South Korea	1:10.64	+1.53
12	8	O	Daichi Yamanaka	Japan	1:10.67	+1.56
13	2	O	Jonathan Garcia	United States	1:10.78	+1.67
14	4	I	Laurent Dubreuil	Canada	1:10.82	+1.71
15	5	I	Ronald Mulder	Netherlands	1:10.83	+1.72
16	4	O	Daniel Greig	Australia	1:10.91	+1.80
17	3	I	Henrik Fagerli Rukke	Norway	1:11.00	+1.89
18	1	I	Johann Jørgen Sæves	Norway	1:11.41	+2.30
19	2	I	Tsubasa Hasegawa	Japan	1:12.19	+3.08
20	1	O	Cornelius Kersten	Great Britain	1:12.87	+3.76

=== Overall standings ===
After all events.

Rank	Name	Country	Time	Diff
1st place, gold medalist(s)	Håvard Holmefjord Lorentzen	Norway	139.360	
2nd place, silver medalist(s)	Kjeld Nuis	Netherlands	139.510	+0.15
3rd place, bronze medalist(s)	Kai Verbij	Netherlands	139.535	+0.18
4	Nico Ihle	Germany	139.660	+0.30
5	Mika Poutala	Finland	139.945	+0.59
6	Mitchell Whitmore	United States	140.085	+0.73
7	Piotr Michalski	Poland	140.230	+0.87
8	Ronald Mulder	Netherlands	140.600	+1.24
9	Aleksey Yesin	Russia	140.700	+1.34
10	Daichi Yamanaka	Japan	140.780	+1.42
11	Cha Min-kyu	South Korea	140.925	+1.57
12	Laurent Dubreuil	Canada	140.990	+1.63
13	Sebastian Kłosiński	Poland	141.270	+1.91
14	Henrik Fagerli Rukke	Norway	141.710	+2.35
15	Mikhail Kozlov	Russia	141.760	+2.40
16	Daniel Greig	Australia	141.790	+2.43
17	Johann Jørgen Sæves	Norway	142.020	+2.66
18	Jonathan Garcia	United States	142.215	+2.86
19	Tsubasa Hasegawa	Japan	142.325	+2.97
20	Cornelius Kersten	Great Britain	145.350	+5.99
–	Yang Tao	China	—	
–	Gao Tingyu	China	—	
–	Joel Dufter	Germany	—	
