= 2017 World Sprint Speed Skating Championships – Men =

Men at the 2017 World Sprint Speed Skating Championships
- Venue: Olympic Oval
- Location: Calgary, Canada
- Dates: 25–26 February
- Competitors: 28 from 14 nations
- Winning time: 136.065

Medalists
gold medal	Kai Verbij	Netherlands
silver medal	Håvard Holmefjord Lorentzen	Norway
bronze medal	Kjeld Nuis	Netherlands

The Men competition at the 2017 World Championships was held on 25 and 26 February 2017.

== Results ==
=== 500 m ===
The race was started on 25 February 2017 at 13:18.

Rank	Pair	Lane	Name	Country	Time	Diff
1	12	o	Ronald Mulder	Netherlands	34.18	
2	10	i	Roman Krech	Kazakhstan	34.21	+0.03
3	13	o	Ruslan Murashov	Russia	34.29	+0.11
4	12	i	Laurent Dubreuil	Canada	34.31	+0.13
5	14	o	Nico Ihle	Germany	34.37	+0.19
6	8	i	Håvard Holmefjord Lorentzen	Norway	34.43	+0.25
7	13	i	Mika Poutala	Finland	34.44	+0.26
8	11	i	Mitchell Whitmore	United States	34.46	+0.28
9	7	o	Kai Verbij	Netherlands	34.48	+0.30
10	8	o	Ryohei Haga	Japan	34.54	+0.36
11	6	o	David Bosa	Italy	34.59	+0.41
12	14	i	Tsubasa Hasegawa	Japan	34.68	+0.50
13	1	i	Espen Aarnes Hvammen	Norway	34.73	+0.55
14	6	i	Artur Nogal	Poland	34.77	+0.59
15	11	o	Kim Tae-yun	South Korea	34.80	+0.62
16	7	i	Jonathan Garcia	United States	34.87	+0.69
17	2	o	Piotr Michalski	Poland	34.88	+0.70
18	10	o	Kjeld Nuis	Netherlands	34.90	+0.72
19	3	o	Aleksey Yesin	Russia	34.92	+0.74
20	4	o	Shunsuke Nakamura	Japan	34.97	+0.79
21	4	i	Liu An	China	34.98	+0.80
22	2	i	Mikhail Kazelin	Russia	35.02	+0.84
23	9	o	Vincent De Haître	Canada	35.04	+0.86
24	3	i	Mirko Giacomo Nenzi	Italy	35.10	+0.92
25	5	o	Sebastian Kłosiński	Poland	35.15	+0.97
26	1	o	Joel Dufter	Germany	35.42	+1.24
27	5	i	Kim Young-ho	South Korea	35.64	+1.46
—	9	i	Daniel Greig	Australia	DSQ	

=== 1000 m ===
The race was started on 25 February 2017 at 15:07.

Rank	Pair	Lane	Name	Country	Time	Diff
1	13	i	Kjeld Nuis	Netherlands	1:06.61	
2	12	i	Vincent De Haître	Canada	1:06.72	+0.11
3	11	i	Kai Verbij	Netherlands	1:06.73	+0.12
4	10	i	Håvard Holmefjord Lorentzen	Norway	1:07.08	+0.47
5	10	o	Nico Ihle	Germany	1:07.16	+0.55
6	12	o	Jonathan Garcia	United States	1:07.83	+1.22
7	11	o	Mitchell Whitmore	United States	1:07.88	+1.27
7	7	o	Joel Dufter	Germany	1:07.88	+1.27
9	14	i	Mika Poutala	Finland	1:07.96	+1.35
10	8	o	Ronald Mulder	Netherlands	1:08.07	+1.46
10	14	o	Laurent Dubreuil	Canada	1:08.07	+1.46
12	5	i	Tsubasa Hasegawa	Japan	1:08.49	+1.88
12	7	i	Shunsuke Nakamura	Japan	1:08.49	+1.88
14	9	i	Ruslan Murashov	Russia	1:08.56	+1.95
15	2	o	Roman Krech	Kazakhstan	1:08.60	+1.99
16	13	o	Kim Tae-yun	South Korea	1:08.70	+2.09
17	1	o	Piotr Michalski	Poland	1:08.76	+2.15
18	6	o	Liu An	China	1:08.78	+2.17
19	6	i	Espen Aarnes Hvammen	Norway	1:08.79	+2.18
20	8	i	Sebastian Kłosiński	Poland	1:08.81	+2.20
21	4	i	David Bosa	Italy	1:08.88	+2.27
22	5	o	Ryohei Haga	Japan	1:09.19	+2.58
23	1	i	Mirko Giacomo Nenzi	Italy	1:09.24	+2.63
24	3	i	Kim Young-ho	South Korea	1:09.49	+2.88
25	3	o	Artur Nogal	Poland	1:09.75	+3.14
26	2	i	Daniel Greig	Australia	1:09.96	+3.35
27	4	o	Mikhail Kazelin	Russia	1:10.31	+3.70
—	9	o	Aleksey Yesin	Russia	DSQ	

=== 500 m ===
The race was started on 26 February 2017 at 13:22.

Rank	Pair	Lane	Name	Country	Time	Diff
1	11	i	Ronald Mulder	Netherlands	34.08	
2	10	o	Roman Krech	Kazakhstan	34.21	+0.13
3	11	o	Mika Poutala	Finland	34.23	+0.15
4	14	i	Kai Verbij	Netherlands	34.25	+0.17
5	9	i	Ruslan Murashov	Russia	34.26	+0.18
6	7	i	Ryohei Haga	Japan	34.44	+0.36
7	8	o	Tsubasa Hasegawa	Japan	34.46	+0.38
8	13	o	Laurent Dubreuil	Canada	34.50	+0.42
8	12	o	Mitchell Whitmore	United States	34.50	+0.42
10	14	o	Håvard Holmefjord Lorentzen	Norway	34.62	+0.54
11	6	i	Kim Tae-yun	South Korea	34.65	+0.57
12	5	o	Artur Nogal	Poland	34.71	+0.63
13	8	i	David Bosa	Italy	34.73	+0.65
14	4	o	Mirko Giacomo Nenzi	Italy	34.75	+0.67
15	7	o	Espen Aarnes Hvammen	Norway	34.77	+0.69
16	12	i	Kjeld Nuis	Netherlands	34.84	+0.76
16	4	i	Piotr Michalski	Poland	34.84	+0.76
18	9	o	Jonathan Garcia	United States	34.87	+0.79
19	3	o	Mikhail Kazelin	Russia	34.90	+0.82
20	3	i	Joel Dufter	Germany	35.00	+0.92
20	10	i	Vincent De Haître	Canada	35.00	+0.92
22	13	i	Nico Ihle	Germany	35.03	+0.95
23	5	i	Shunsuke Nakamura	Japan	35.04	+0.96
24	6	o	Liu An	China	35.09	+1.01
25	2	i	Sebastian Kłosiński	Poland	35.31	+1.23
26	2	o	Kim Young-ho	South Korea	35.66	+1.58
27	1	o	Daniel Greig	Australia	35.79	+1.71
—	1	i	Aleksey Yesin	Russia	DSQ	

=== 1000 m ===
The race was started on 26 February 2017 at 15:07.

Rank	Pair	Lane	Name	Country	Time	Diff
1	9	o	Kjeld Nuis	Netherlands	1:06.51	
2	7	o	Vincent De Haître	Canada	1:07.23	+0.72
3	12	o	Håvard Holmefjord Lorentzen	Norway	1:07.38	+0.87
4	7	i	Jonathan Garcia	United States	1:07.68	+1.17
5	9	i	Nico Ihle	Germany	1:07.75	+1.24
6	11	i	Laurent Dubreuil	Canada	1:07.77	+1.26
7	10	i	Mitchell Whitmore	United States	1:07.88	+1.37
8	3	i	Joel Dufter	Germany	1:07.92	+1.41
9	13	o	Kai Verbij	Netherlands	1:07.94	+1.43
10	11	o	Mika Poutala	Finland	1:07.97	+1.46
11	13	i	Ronald Mulder	Netherlands	1:08.23	+1.72
12	5	i	Piotr Michalski	Poland	1:08.29	+1.78
13	4	o	Shunsuke Nakamura	Japan	1:08.48	+1.97
14	6	i	Kim Tae-yun	South Korea	1:08.54	+2.03
15	8	i	Ryohei Haga	Japan	1:08.62	+2.11
16	2	o	Sebastian Kłosiński	Poland	1:08.65	+2.14
17	12	i	Roman Krech	Kazakhstan	1:08.66	+2.15
18	2	i	Liu An	China	1:08.71	+2.20
19	5	o	Espen Aarnes Hvammen	Norway	1:09.03	+2.52
20	8	o	Tsubasa Hasegawa	Japan	1:09.04	+2.53
21	1	o	Kim Young-ho	South Korea	1:09.41	+2.90
22	4	i	Artur Nogal	Poland	1:09.47	+2.96
23	6	o	David Bosa	Italy	1:09.70	+3.19
24	1	i	Mikhail Kazelin	Russia	1:09.94	+3.43
25	3	o	Mirko Giacomo Nenzi	Italy	1:10.36	+3.85
—	10	o	Ruslan Murashov	Russia	DNS	

=== Overall standings ===
After all events.

Rank	Name	Country	Points	Diff
1st place, gold medalist(s)	Kai Verbij	Netherlands	136.065 WR	
2nd place, silver medalist(s)	Håvard Holmefjord Lorentzen	Norway	136.280	+0.22
3rd place, bronze medalist(s)	Kjeld Nuis	Netherlands	136.300	+0.24
4	Ronald Mulder	Netherlands	136.410	+0.35
5	Mika Poutala	Finland	136.635	+0.57
6	Laurent Dubreuil	Canada	136.730	+0.67
7	Mitchell Whitmore	United States	136.840	+0.78
8	Nico Ihle	Germany	136.855	+0.79
9	Vincent De Haître	Canada	137.015	+0.95
10	Roman Krech	Kazakhstan	137.050	+0.99
11	Jonathan Garcia	United States	137.495	+1.43
12	Ryohei Haga	Japan	137.885	+1.82
13	Tsubasa Hasegawa	Japan	137.905	+1.84
14	Kim Tae-yun	South Korea	138.070	+2.01
15	Piotr Michalski	Poland	138.245	+2.18
16	Joel Dufter	Germany	138.320	+2.26
17	Espen Aarnes Hvammen	Norway	138.410	+2.35
18	Shunsuke Nakamura	Japan	138.495	+2.43
19	David Bosa	Italy	138.610	+2.55
20	Liu An	China	138.815	+2.75
21	Artur Nogal	Poland	139.090	+3.03
22	Sebastian Kłosiński	Poland	139.190	+3.13
23	Mirko Giacomo Nenzi	Italy	139.650	+3.59
24	Mikhail Kazelin	Russia	140.045	+3.98
25	Kim Young-ho	South Korea	140.750	+4.69
26	Ruslan Murashov	Russia	—	
27	Daniel Greig	Australia	—	
28	Alexey Yesin	Russia	—	
