= 2019 World Single Distances Speed Skating Championships – Men's 500 metres =

Men's 500 metres at the 2019 World Single Distances Speed Skating Championships
- Venue: Max Aicher Arena
- Location: Inzell, Germany
- Dates: 8 February
- Competitors: 24 from 10 nations
- Winning time: 34.22

Medalists
gold medal	Ruslan Murashov	Russia
silver medal	Håvard Holmefjord Lorentzen	Norway
bronze medal	Viktor Mushtakov	Russia

The Men's 500 metres competition at the 2019 World Single Distances Speed Skating Championships was held on 8 February 2019.

== Results ==
The race was started at 16:55.

Rank	Pair	Lane	Name	Country	Time	Diff
1st place, gold medalist(s)	8	i	Ruslan Murashov	Russia	34.22	
2nd place, silver medalist(s)	10	i	Håvard Holmefjord Lorentzen	Norway	34.35	+0.13
3rd place, bronze medalist(s)	10	o	Viktor Mushtakov	Russia	34.43	+0.21
4	7	o	Cha Min-kyu	South Korea	34.44	+0.22
5	11	i	Yuma Murakami	Japan	34.47	+0.25
6	1	o	Ronald Mulder	Netherlands	34.50	+0.28
7	12	i	Pavel Kulizhnikov	Russia	34.53	+0.31
8	7	i	Dai Dai Ntab	Netherlands	34.55	+0.33
9	3	o	Gao Tingyu	China	34.59	+0.37
10	6	i	Jan Smeekens	Netherlands	34.68	+0.46
11	9	o	Nico Ihle	Germany	34.69	+0.47
12	4	o	Artur Waś	Poland	34.72	+0.50
13	8	o	Kim Jun-ho	South Korea	34.74	+0.52
14	9	i	Laurent Dubreuil	Canada	34.803	+0.58
15	4	i	Artur Nogal	Poland	34.804	+0.58
16	11	o	Tatsuya Shinhama	Japan	34.84	+0.62
17	5	i	Gilmore Junio	Canada	34.85	+0.63
18	1	i	Piotr Michalski	Poland	34.92	+0.70
19	2	o	Henrik Fagerli Rukke	Norway	34.93	+0.71
20	5	o	Kim Tae-yun	South Korea	35.01	+0.79
21	3	i	David Bosa	Italy	35.15	+0.93
22	6	o	Bjørn Magnussen	Norway	35.33	+1.11
23	2	i	Christopher Fiola	Canada	35.55	+1.33
	12	o	Tsubasa Hasegawa	Japan	Disqualified	
