= Speed skating at the 2022 Winter Olympics – Men's 500 metres =

Men's 500 metres at the XXIV Olympic Winter Games
- Speed skating
- Venue: National Speed Skating Oval, Beijing
- Date: 12 February 2022
- Competitors: 30 from 15 nations
- Winning time: 34.32 OR

Medalists
1st place, gold medalist(s)		Gao Tingyu	China
2nd place, silver medalist(s)		Cha Min-kyu	South Korea
3rd place, bronze medalist(s)		Wataru Morishige	Japan

The men's 500 m competition in speed skating at the 2022 Winter Olympics was held on 12 February, at the National Speed Skating Oval ("Ice Ribbon") in Beijing. The event was won by three Asians, Gao Tingyu of China (gold medal), the 2018 bronze medalist, who set a new Olympic record, Cha Min-kyu of South Korea (silver medal), replicating his 2018 success, and Wataru Morishige of Japan (bronze medal), his first Olympic medal.

The defending champion and the Olympic record holder was Håvard Holmefjord Lorentzen. Laurent Dubreuil was the 2021 World Single Distances champion at the 500 m distance. The silver medalist and the world record holder was Pavel Kulizhnikov, who did not qualify for the event. Dubreuil was leading the 2021–22 ISU Speed Skating World Cup at the 500 m distance with eight events completed before the Olympics, followed by Morishige and Tatsuya Shinhama. Dubreuil skated the season best time, 33.77 in Calgary on 10 December 2021.

Jordan Stolz in pair 5 became the only skater with the time below 35 seconds. His time was improved in pair 7 by Gao, who set a new Olympic record at 34:32. In pair 10, Cha Min-kyu skated just 0.07 behind the time of Gao. In pair 14, Morishige skated provisionally third time, with one pair to go. In the last pair, Dubreuil was 0.02 seconds slower than Morishigem thus leaving the medal allocation unchanged.

== Qualification ==
A total of 30 entry quotas were available for the event, with a maximum of three athletes per NOC. The first 20 athletes qualified through their performance at the 2021–22 ISU Speed Skating World Cup, while the last ten earned quotas by having the best times among athletes not already qualified. A country could only earn the maximum three spots through the World Cup rankings.

The qualification time for the event (35.70) was released on July 1, 2021, and was unchanged from 2018. Skaters had the time period of July 1, 2021 – January 16, 2022 to achieve qualification times at valid International Skating Union (ISU) events.

== Records ==
Prior to this competition, the existing world, Olympic and track records were as follows.

World record	Pavel Kulizhnikov (RUS)	33.61	Salt Lake City, United States	9 March 2019
Olympic record	Håvard Holmefjord Lorentzen (NOR)	34.41	Gangneung, South Korea	19 February 2018
Track record	Kim Jun-ho (KOR)	35.17		8 October 2021

A new Olympic record was set during the competition; the previous record was set four years earlier and was broken by 0.09 seconds; the top two finishers were under the previous record.

Date	Round	Athlete	Country	Time	Record
12 February	Pair 7	Gao Tingyu	China	34.32	OR, TR

== Results ==
The race was started at 16:53.

Rank	Pair	Lane	Name	Country	Time	Time behind	Notes
1st place, gold medalist(s)	7	I	Gao Tingyu	China	34.32	—	OR
2nd place, silver medalist(s)	10	O	Cha Min-kyu	South Korea	34.39	+0.07	
3rd place, bronze medalist(s)	14	O	Wataru Morishige	Japan	34.50	+0.18	
4	15	I	Laurent Dubreuil	Canada	34.522	+0.20	
5	12	O	Piotr Michalski	Poland	34.524	+0.20	
6	11	I	Kim Jun-ho	South Korea	34.54	+0.22	
7	13	O	Artem Arefyev	ROC	34.56	+0.24	
8	13	I	Yuma Murakami	Japan	34.57	+0.25	
9	14	I	Viktor Mushtakov	ROC	34.60	+0.28	
10	9	I	Ruslan Murashov	ROC	34.63	+0.31	
11	7	O	Damian Żurek	Poland	34.734	+0.41	
12	8	O	Merijn Scheperkamp	Netherlands	34.736	+0.41	
13	5	O	Jordan Stolz	United States	34.85	+0.53	
14	9	O	Kai Verbij	Netherlands	34.87	+0.55	
15	11	O	Håvard Holmefjord Lorentzen	Norway	34.921	+0.60	
16	10	I	Marek Kania	Poland	34.928	+0.60	
17	5	I	Bjørn Magnussen	Norway	34.96	+0.64	
18	3	I	Thomas Krol	Netherlands	35.06	+0.74	
19	3	O	Jeffrey Rosanelli	Italy	35.08	+0.76	
20	15	O	Tatsuya Shinhama	Japan	35.12	+0.80	
21	4	I	Gilmore Junio	Canada	35.162	+0.84	
21	8	I	Yang Tao	China	35.162	+0.84	
23	4	O	David Bosa	Italy	35.168	+0.84	
24	6	I	Marten Liiv	Estonia	35.26	+0.94	
25	2	O	Cornelius Kersten	Great Britain	35.36	+1.04	
26	6	O	Joel Dufter	Germany	35.37	+1.05	
27	1	O	Austin Kleba	United States	35.41	+1.08	
28	2	I	Ivan Arzhanikov	Kazakhstan	35.82	+1.50	
29	1	I	Antoine Gélinas-Beaulieu	Canada	35.84	+1.52	
30	12	I	Ignat Golovatsiuk	Belarus	37.05	+2.73	
