= Speed skating at the 2018 Winter Olympics – Men's 1000 metres =

Men's 1000 metres at the XXIII Olympic Winter Games
- Venue: Gangneung Oval, Gangneung, South Korea
- Date: 23 February 2018
- Competitors: 36 from 19 nations
- Winning time: 1:07.95

Medalists
| 1st place, gold medalist(s) | | Kjeld Nuis | Netherlands |
| 2nd place, silver medalist(s) | | Håvard Holmefjord Lorentzen | Norway |
| 3rd place, bronze medalist(s) | | Kim Tae-yun | South Korea |

The men's 1000 metres speed skating competition of the 2018 Winter Olympics was held on 23 February 2018 at Gangneung Oval in Gangneung on 23 February 2018.

== Records ==
Prior to this competition, the existing world, Olympic and track records were as follows.

| World record | Shani Davis (USA) | 1:06.42 | Salt Lake City, United States | 7 March 2009 |
| Olympic record | Gerard van Velde (NED) | 1:07.18 | Salt Lake City, United States | 16 February 2002 |
| Track record | Kjeld Nuis (NED) | 1:08.26 | | 11 February 2017 |

The following records were set during this competition.

| Date | Round | Athlete | Country | Time | Record |
|---|---|---|---|---|---|
| 23 February | Pair 15 | Kim Tae-yun | South Korea | 1:08.22 | TR |
| 23 February | Pair 16 | Håvard Holmefjord Lorentzen | Norway | 1:07.99 | TR |
| 23 February | Pair 18 | Kjeld Nuis | Netherlands | 1:07.95 | TR |

TR = track record

== Results ==
The races started at 19:00.

| Rank | Pair | Lane | Name | Country | Time | Time behind | Notes |
|---|---|---|---|---|---|---|---|
| 1st place, gold medalist(s) | 18 | I | Kjeld Nuis | Netherlands | 1:07.95 | — | TR |
| 2nd place, silver medalist(s) | 16 | I | Håvard Holmefjord Lorentzen | Norway | 1:07.99 | +0.04 | |
| 3rd place, bronze medalist(s) | 15 | O | Kim Tae-yun | South Korea | 1:08.22 | +0.27 | |
| 4 | 13 | I | Joey Mantia | United States | 1:08.564 | +0.61 | |
| 5 | 14 | O | Takuro Oda | Japan | 1:08.568 | +0.61 | |
| 6 | 17 | I | Kai Verbij | Netherlands | 1:08.61 | +0.66 | |
| 7 | 14 | I | Shani Davis | United States | 1:08.78 | +0.83 | |
| 8 | 12 | O | Nico Ihle | Germany | 1:08.93 | +0.98 | |
| 9 | 16 | O | Koen Verweij | Netherlands | 1:09.14 | +1.19 | |
| 10 | 10 | I | Mitchell Whitmore | United States | 1:09.17 | +1.22 | |
| 11 | 15 | I | Alexandre St-Jean | Canada | 1:09.24 | +1.29 | |
| 12 | 5 | I | Cha Min-kyu | South Korea | 1:09.27 | +1.32 | |
| 13 | 9 | I | Chung Jae-woong | South Korea | 1:09.43 | +1.48 | |
| 14 | 13 | O | Joel Dufter | Germany | 1:09.46 | +1.51 | |
| 15 | 10 | O | Haralds Silovs | Latvia | 1:09.50 | +1.55 | |
| 16 | 18 | O | Mika Poutala | Finland | 1:09.58 | +1.63 | |
| 17 | 9 | O | Sebastian Kłosiński | Poland | 1:09.59 | +1.64 | |
| 18 | 7 | O | Marten Liiv | Estonia | 1:09.75 | +1.80 | |
| 19 | 17 | O | Vincent De Haître | Canada | 1:09.79 | +1.84 | |
| 20 | 4 | I | Tsubasa Hasegawa | Japan | 1:09.83 | +1.88 | |
| 21 | 4 | O | Konrád Nagy | Hungary | 1:09.92 | +1.97 | |
| 22 | 11 | O | Daniel Greig | Australia | 1:09.99 | +2.04 | |
| 23 | 12 | I | Konrad Niedźwiedzki | Poland | 1:10.026 | +2.07 | |
| 24 | 6 | O | Daichi Yamanaka | Japan | 1:10.027 | +2.07 | |
| 25 | 3 | O | Laurent Dubreuil | Canada | 1:10.03 | +2.08 | |
| 26 | 2 | O | Yang Tao | China | 1:10.10 | +2.15 | |
| 27 | 7 | I | Denis Kuzin | Kazakhstan | 1:10.13 | +2.18 | |
| 28 | 11 | I | Ignat Golovatsiuk | Belarus | 1:10.140 | +2.19 | |
| 29 | 8 | O | Stanislav Palkin | Kazakhstan | 1:10.149 | +2.19 | |
| 30 | 3 | I | Mirko Giacomo Nenzi | Italy | 1:10.16 | +2.21 | |
| 31 | 8 | I | Piotr Michalski | Poland | 1:10.17 | +2.22 | |
| 32 | 1 | O | Henrik Fagerli Rukke | Norway | 1:10.25 | +2.30 | |
| 33 | 5 | O | Fyodor Mezentsev | Kazakhstan | 1:10.62 | +2.67 | |
| 34 | 6 | I | Pedro Causil | Colombia | 1:10.71 | +2.76 | |
| 35 | 1 | I | Mathias Vosté | Belgium | 1:11.24 | +3.29 | |
| 36 | 2 | I | Pekka Koskela | Finland | 1:11.76 | +3.81 | |
