= 2021 World Single Distances Speed Skating Championships – Men's 1000 metres =

Men's 1000 metres at the 2021 World Single Distances Speed Skating Championships
- Venue: Thialf
- Location: Heerenveen, Netherlands
- Date: 13 February
- Competitors: 24 from 12 nations
- Winning time: 1:08.050

Medalists
gold medal	Kai Verbij	Netherlands
silver medal	Pavel Kulizhnikov
bronze medal	Laurent Dubreuil	Canada

The Men's 1000 metres competition at the 2021 World Single Distances Speed Skating Championships was held on 13 February 2021.

== Results ==
The race was started at 16:02.

Rank	Pair	Lane	Name	Country	Time	Diff
1st place, gold medalist(s)	10	o	Kai Verbij	Netherlands	1:08.052	
2nd place, silver medalist(s)	12	i	Pavel Kulizhnikov	Russian Skating Union	1:08.313	+0.26
3rd place, bronze medalist(s)	10	i	Laurent Dubreuil	Canada	1:08.569	+0.51
4	9	i	Håvard Holmefjord Lorentzen	Norway	1:08.704	+0.65
5	9	o	Marten Liiv	Estonia	1:08.922	+0.87
6	8	o	Viktor Mushtakov	Russian Skating Union	1:09.416	+1.36
7	12	o	Wesly Dijs	Netherlands	1:09.446	+1.39
8	7	i	Ignat Golovatsiuk	Belarus	1:09.521	+1.47
9	8	i	Piotr Michalski	Poland	1:09.630	+1.58
10	6	i	Connor Howe	Canada	1:09.720	+1.67
11	5	i	Cornelius Kersten	Great Britain	1:10.020	+1.97
12	6	o	Odin By Farstad	Norway	1:10.247	+2.19
13	11	o	Joel Dufter	Germany	1:10.307	+2.25
14	2	i	Peder Kongshaug	Norway	1:10.328	+2.27
15	3	o	David Bosa	Italy	1:10.418	+2.36
16	4	i	Artur Nogal	Poland	1:10.431	+2.28
17	4	o	Conor McDermott-Mostowy	United States	1:10.435	+2.38
18	1	o	Artem Arefyev	Russian Skating Union	1:10.547	+2.49
19	2	o	Artur Galiyev	Kazakhstan	1:10.606	+2.55
20	5	o	Nico Ihle	Germany	1:10.786	+2.73
21	1	i	Alex Boisvert-Lacroix	Canada	1:11.015	+2.96
22	7	o	Roman Krech	Kazakhstan	1:11.263	+3.21
23	3	i	Demyan Gavrilov	Kazakhstan	1:11.601	+3.55
	11	i	Thomas Krol	Netherlands	Disqualified	
