= 2019 European Speed Skating Championships =

International speed skating competition

- Venue: Ritten Arena, Collalbo, Italy
- Dates: 11–13 January 2019
- Competitors: 68 from 14 nations

Medalist men
1st place, gold medalist(s)		Sven Kramer	NED
1st place, gold medalist(s)		Kai Verbij	NED
2nd place, silver medalist(s)		Patrick Roest	NED
2nd place, silver medalist(s)		Håvard Holmefjord Lorentzen	NOR
3rd place, bronze medalist(s)		Sverre Lunde Pedersen	NOR
3rd place, bronze medalist(s)		Henrik Fagerli Rukke	NOR

Medalist women
1st place, gold medalist(s)		Antoinette de Jong	NED
1st place, gold medalist(s)		Vanessa Herzog	AUT
2nd place, silver medalist(s)		Martina Sáblíková	CZE
2nd place, silver medalist(s)		Daria Kachanova	RUS
3rd place, bronze medalist(s)		Francesca Lollobrigida	ITA
3rd place, bronze medalist(s)		Olga Fatkulina	RUS

The 2019 European Speed Skating Championships took place in Collalbo, Italy from 11 to 13 January 2019. Skaters from 14 countries participated. It was the second time that the allround and sprint tournaments had taken place at the same time and venue.

Sven Kramer and Ireen Wüst, both from the Netherlands, were the defending champions in the allround event. Kai Verbij from the Netherlands and Karolína Erbanová from the Czech Republic were the defending champions in the sprint event.

== Schedule ==
The schedule of events:

Date	Allround	Sprint
Friday, 11 January; 13:30h	500 m women 3000 m women	1st 500 m men 1st 1000m m men
Saturday, 12 January; 11:05h	1500 m women 500 m men 5000 m women 5000 m men	1st 500 m women 2nd 500 m men 1st 1000 m women 2nd 1000 m men
Sunday, 13 January; 12:30h	1500 m men 10000 m men	2nd 500 m women 2nd 1000m m women

All times are CET (UTC+1).

== Allround ==
DNF = did not finish; DNS = did not start, WDR = withdrew, DQ = disqualified, PR = personal record, TR = track record

=== Men's championships ===
==== Day 2 ====
===== 500 metres =====
Rank	Skater	Nat.	Time	Behind	Points
1	Haralds Silovs	(Latvia)	36.33		36.330
2	Håvard Bøkko	(Norway)	36.36	+0.03	36.360
3	Sverre Lunde Pedersen	(Norway)	36.42	+0.09	36.420
4	Patrick Roest	(Netherlands)	36.59	+0.26	36.590
5	Andrea Giovannini	(Italy)	36.65	+0.32	36.650
6	Sven Kramer	(Netherlands)	36.69	+0.36	36.690
7	Sindre Henriksen	(Norway)	36.98	+0.65	36.980
8	Sergey Trofimov	(Russia)	37.24	+0.91	37.240
9	Gabriele Galli	(Italy)	37.47 (PR)	+1.14	37.470
10	Lukas Mann	(Germany)	37.48	+1.15	37.480
11	Douwe de Vries	(Netherlands)	37.58	+1.25	37.580
11	Danila Semerikov	(Russia)	37.58	+1.25	37.580
13	Felix Maly	(Germany)	37.92	+1.59	37.920
14	Vitaly Mikhailov	(Belarus)	37.98	+1.65	37.980
15	Artur Janicki	(Poland)	38.14 (PR)	+1.81	38.140
16	Szymon Pałka	(Poland)	38.43	+2.10	38.430
17	Philip Due Schmidt	(Denmark)	38.69	+2.36	38.690
18	Sebastian Druszkiewicz	(Czech Republic)	39.38	+3.05	39.380
	Davide Ghiotto	(Italy)	DNF	–	–

===== 5000 metres =====
Rank	Skater	Nat.	Time	Behind	Points
1	Sven Kramer	(Netherlands)	6:17.66		37.766
2	Patrick Roest	(Netherlands)	6:18.21	+0.55	37.821
3	Sverre Lunde Pedersen	(Norway)	6:20.59	+2.93	38.059
4	Danila Semerikov	(Russia)	6:26.35	+8.69	38.635
5	Sergey Trofimov	(Russia)	6:27.29	+9.63	38.729
6	Håvard Bøkko	(Norway)	6:30.23	+12.57	39.023
7	Douwe de Vries	(Netherlands)	6:31.41	+13.75	39.141
8	Andrea Giovannini	(Italy)	6:33.13	+15.47	39.313
9	Haralds Silovs	(Latvia)	6:36.24	+18.58	39.624
10	Vitaly Mikhailov	(Belarus)	6:36.41	+18.75	39.641
11	Felix Maly	(Germany)	6:45.82	+28.16	40.582
12	Sebastian Druszkiewicz	(Czech Republic)	6:46.84	+29.18	40.684
13	Lukas Mann	(Germany)	6:48.79	+31.13	40.879
14	Sindre Henriksen	(Norway)	6:48.92	+31.26	40.892
15	Szymon Pałka	(Poland)	6:51.08	+33.42	41.108
16	Philip Due Schmidt	(Denmark)	6:51.74	+34.08	41.174
17	Artur Janicki	(Poland)	6:52.09	+34.43	41.209
18	Gabriele Galli	(Italy)	7:00.30	+42.64	42.030
	Davide Ghiotto	(Italy)	WDR	–	–

==== Day 3 ====
===== 1500 metres =====
Rank	Skater	Nat.	Time	Behind	Points
1	Sven Kramer	(Netherlands)	1:45.91		35.303
2	Patrick Roest	(Netherlands)	1:46.40	+0.49	35.466
3	Sverre Lunde Pedersen	(Norway)	1:46.650	+0.74	35.550
4	Håvard Bøkko	(Norway)	1:47.738	+1.82	35.910
5	Sindre Henriksen	(Norway)	1:48.30	+2.39	36.100
6	Haralds Silovs	(Latvia)	1:49.44	+3.53	36.480
7	Sergey Trofimov	(Russia)	1:49.68	+3.77	36.560
8	Douwe de Vries	(Netherlands)	1:50.21	+4.30	36.736
9	Andrea Giovannini	(Italy)	1:50.63	+4.72	36.878
10	Lukas Mann	(Germany)	1:50.98	+5.07	36.993
11	Felix Maly	(Germany)	1:51.22	+5.31	37.073
12	Artur Janicki	(Poland)	1:52.26	+6.35	37.420
13	Vitaly Mikhailov	(Belarus)	1:52.36	+6.45	37.453
14	Gabriele Galli	(Italy)	1:52.89	+6.98	37.630
15	Szymon Pałka	(Poland)	1:53.24	+7.32	37.746
16	Sebastian Druszkiewicz	(Czech Republic)	1:54.18	+8.27	38.060
17	Philip Due Schmidt	(Denmark)	1:57.09	+11.18	39.030
	Danila Semerikov	(Russia)	DQ	–	–

===== 10,000 metres =====
Rank	Skater	Nat.	Time	Behind	Points
1	Patrick Roest	(Netherlands)	13:26.45		40.323
2	Sven Kramer	(Netherlands)	13:26.88	+0.42	40.344
3	Douwe de Vries	(Netherlands)	13:35.87	+9.42	40.793
4	Sverre Lunde Pedersen	(Norway)	13:36.14	+9.69	40.807
5	Håvard Bøkko	(Norway)	13:43.26	+16.81	41.163
6	Andrea Giovannini	(Italy)	13:43.58	+17.13	41.179
7	Sergey Trofimov	(Russia)	13:47.18	+20.73	41.359
8	Sindre Henriksen	(Norway)	14:06.84	+40.39	42.342

==== Final ranking ====
Rank	Skater	Nat.	500 m	5000 m	1500 m	10,000 m	Points	Behind
1st place, gold medalist(s)	Sven Kramer	(Netherlands)	36.69 (6)	6:17.66 (1)	1:45.91 (1)	13:26.88 (2)	150.103	
2nd place, silver medalist(s)	Patrick Roest	(Netherlands)	36.59 (4)	6:18.21 (2)	1:46.40 (2)	13:26.45 (1)	150.199	0.10
3rd place, bronze medalist(s)	Sverre Lunde Pedersen	(Norway)	36.42 (3)	6:20.59 (3)	1:46.65 (3)	13:36.14 (4)	150.836	0.74
4	Håvard Bøkko	(Norway)	36.36 (2)	6:30.23 (6)	1:47.73 (4)	13:43.26 (5)	152.456	2.36
5	Sergey Trofimov	(Russia)	37.24 (8)	6:27.29 (5)	1:49.68 (7)	13:47.18 (7)	153.888	3.79
6	Andrea Giovannini	(Italy)	36.65 (5)	6:33.13 (8)	1:50.63 (9)	13:43.58 (6)	154.018	3.92
7	Douwe de Vries	(Netherlands)	37.58 (11)	6:31.41 (7)	1:50.21 (8)	13:35.87 (3)	154.250	4.15
8	Sindre Henriksen	(Norway)	36.98 (7)	6:48.92 (14)	1:48.30 (5)	14:06.84 (8)	156.314	6.22
9	Haralds Silovs	(Latvia)	36.33 (1)	6:36.24 (9)	1:49.44 (6)	WDR	112.434	
10	Vitaly Mikhailov	(Belarus)	37.98 (10)	6:36.41 (10)	1:52.36 (13)		115.074	
11	Lukas Mann	(Germany)	37.48 (10)	6:48.79 (13)	1:50.98 (10)		115.352	
12	Felix Maly	(Germany)	37.92 (13)	6:45.82 (11)	1:51.22 (11)		115.575	
13	Artur Janicki	(Poland)	38.14 (15)	6:52.09 (17)	1:52.26 (12)		116.769	
14	Gabriele Galli	(Italy)	37.47 (9)	7:00.30 (18)	1:52.89 (14)		117.130	
15	Szymon Pałka	(Poland)	38.43 (16)	6:51.08 (15)	1:53.24 (15)		117.284	
16	Sebastian Druszkiewicz	(Czech Republic)	39.38 (18)	6:46.84 (12)	1:54.18 (16)		118.124	
17	Philip Due Schmidt	(Denmark)	38.69 (17)	6:51.74 (16)	1:57.09 (17)		118.894	
18	Danila Semerikov	(Russia)	37.58 (11)	6:26.35 (4)	DQ		-	
19	Davide Ghiotto	(Italy)	DNF	WDR			-	

=== Women's championships ===
==== Day 1 ====
===== 500 metres =====
Rank	Skater	Nat.	Time	Behind	Points
1	Antoinette de Jong	(Netherlands)	39.19		39.190
2	Elizaveta Kazelina	(Russia)	39.26	+0.07	39.260
3	Francesca Lollobrigida	(Italy)	39.56 (PR)	+0.37	39.560
4	Ireen Wüst	(Netherlands)	39.72	+0.53	39.720
5	Nikola Zdráhalová	(Czech Republic)	40.04	+0.85	40.040
6	Ida Njåtun	(Norway)	40.46	+1.27	40.460
7	Evgeniia Lalenkova	(Russia)	40.65	+1.46	40.650
8	Ragne Wiklund	(Norway)	40.68	+1.49	40.680
9	Natalya Voronina	(Russia)	40.76	+1.57	40.760
10	Carlijn Achtereekte	(Netherlands)	40.91	+1.72	40.910
11	Martina Sáblíková	(Czech Republic)	40.95	+1.76	40.950
12	Roxanne Dufter	(Germany)	41.07	+1.88	41.070
13	Sofie Karoline Haugen	(Norway)	41.41	+2.22	41.410
14	Michelle Uhrig	(Germany)	41.43	+2.24	41.430
15	Karolina Gąsecka	(Poland)	41.53	+2.34	41.530
16	Saskia Alusalu	(Estonia)	41.91	+2.72	41.910

===== 3000 metres =====
Rank	Skater	Nat.	Time	Behind	Points
1	Antoinette de Jong	(Netherlands)	4:08.07		41.345
2	Martina Sáblíková	(Czech Republic)	4:08.22	+0.15	41.370
3	Francesca Lollobrigida	(Italy)	4:11.28	+3.21	41.880
4	Natalya Voronina	(Russia)	4:11.30	+3.23	41.883
5	Carlijn Achtereekte	(Netherlands)	4:11.93	+3.86	41.988
6	Evgeniia Lalenkova	(Russia)	4:14.15	+6.08	42.358
7	Ireen Wüst	(Netherlands)	4:14.61	+6.54	42.435
8	Roxanne Dufter	(Germany)	4:19.28	+11.21	43.213
9	Ida Njåtun	(Norway)	4:19.49	+11.42	43.248
10	Ragne Wiklund	(Norway)	4:20.33	+12.26	43.388
11	Saskia Alusalu	(Estonia)	4:22.20	+14.13	43.700
12	Elizaveta Kazelina	(Russia)	4:23.18	+15.11	43.863
13	Nikola Zdráhalová	(Czech Republic)	4:25.76	+17.69	44.293
14	Sofie Karoline Haugen	(Norway)	4:28.42	+20.35	44.736
15	Karolina Gąsecka	(Poland)	4:31.38	+23.31	45.230
16	Michelle Uhrig	(Germany)	4:32.50	+24.43	45.416

==== Day 2 ====
===== 1500 metres =====
Rank	Skater	Nat.	Time	Behind	Points
1	Antoinette de Jong	(Netherlands)	1:57.03		39.010
2	Francesca Lollobrigida	(Italy)	1:57.99	+0.96	39.330
3	Martina Sáblíková	(Czech Republic)	1:58.07	+1.04	39.356
4	Elizaveta Kazelina	(Russia)	1:58.65	+1.62	39.550
5	Ireen Wüst	(Netherlands)	1:58.80	+1.77	39.600
6	Evgeniia Lalenkova	(Russia)	1:58.90	+1.87	39.633
7	Natalya Voronina	(Russia)	2:00.12	+3.09	40.040
8	Ida Njåtun	(Norway)	2:00.15	+3.12	40.050
9	Ragne Wiklund	(Norway)	2:00.47	+3.44	40.156
10	Carlijn Achtereekte	(Netherlands)	2:00.64	+3.61	40.213
11	Roxanne Dufter	(Germany)	2:00.72	+3.69	40.240
12	Nikola Zdráhalová	(Czech Republic)	2:01.44	+4.41	40.480
13	Sofie Karoline Haugen	(Norway)	2:04.94	+7.91	41.646
14	Michelle Uhrig	(Germany)	2:05.57	+8.54	41.856
15	Saskia Alusalu	(Estonia)	2:05.76	+8.73	41.920
16	Karolina Gąsecka	(Poland)	2:06.72	+9.69	42.240

===== 5000 metres =====
Rank	Skater	Nat.	Time	Behind	Points
1	Martina Sáblíková	(Czech Republic)	7:03.88		42.388
2	Antoinette de Jong	(Netherlands)	7:13.73	+9.85	43.373
3	Carlijn Achtereekte	(Netherlands)	7:15.31	+11.43	43.531
4	Natalya Voronina	(Russia)	7:15.86	+11.98	43.586
5	Evgeniia Lalenkova	(Russia)	7:21.59	+17.71	44.159
6	Francesca Lollobrigida	(Italy)	7:21.67	+17.79	44.167
7	Ireen Wüst	(Netherlands)	7:22.99	+19.11	44.299
8	Roxanne Dufter	(Germany)	7:30.96	+27.08	45.096

==== Final ranking ====
Rank	Skater	Nat.	500 m	3000 m	1500 m	5000 m	Points	Behind
1st place, gold medalist(s)	Antoinette de Jong	(Netherlands)	39.19 (1)	4:08.07 (1)	1:57.03 (1)	7:13.73 (2)	162.918	
2nd place, silver medalist(s)	Martina Sáblíková	(Czech Republic)	40.95 (11)	4:08.22 (2)	1:58.07 (3)	7:03.88 (1)	164.064	+1.15
3rd place, bronze medalist(s)	Francesca Lollobrigida	(Italy)	39.56 (3)	4:11.28 (3)	1:57.99 (2)	7:21.67 (6)	164.937	+2.02
4	Ireen Wüst	(Netherlands)	39.72 (4)	4:14.61 (7)	1:58.80 (5)	7:22.99 (7)	166.054	+3.14
5	Natalya Voronina	(Russia)	40.76 (9)	4:11.30 (4)	2:00.12 (7)	7:15.86 (4)	166.269	+3.36
6	Carlijn Achtereekte	(Netherlands)	40.91 (10)	4:11.93 (5)	2:00.64 (10)	7:15.31 (3)	166.642	+3.73
7	Evgeniia Lalenkova	(Russia)	40.65 (7)	4:14.15 (6)	1:58.90 (6)	7:21.59 (5)	166.800	+3.89
8	Roxanne Dufter	(Germany)	41.07 (12)	4:19.28 (8)	2:00.72 (11)	7:30.96 (8)	169.619	+6.71
9	Elizaveta Kazelina	(Russia)	39.26 (2)	4:23.18 (12)	1:58.65 (4)		122.673	
10	Ida Njåtun	(Norway)	40.46 (6)	4:19.49 (9)	2:00.15 (8)		123.758	
11	Ragne Wiklund	(Norway)	40.68 (8)	4:20.33 (10)	2:00.47 (9)		124.224	
12	Nikola Zdráhalová	(Czech Republic)	40.04 (5)	4:25.76 (13)	2:01.44 (12)		124.813	
13	Saskia Alusalu	(Estonia)	41.91 (16)	4:22.20 (11)	2:05.76 (15)		127.530	
14	Sofie Karoline Haugen	(Norway)	41.41 (13)	4:28.42 (14)	2:04.94 (13)		127.792	
15	Michelle Uhrig	(Germany)	41.43 (14)	4:32.50 (16)	2:05.57 (14)		128.702	
16	Karolina Gąsecka	(Poland)	41.53 (15)	4:31.38 (15)	2:06.72 (16)		129.000	

== Sprint ==
DNF = did not finish; DNS = did not start, WDR = withdrew, DQ = disqualified, PR = personal record, TR = track record

=== Men's championships ===
==== Day 1 ====
===== 500 metres =====
Rank	Skater	Nat.	Time	Behind	Points
1	Kai Verbij	(Netherlands)	35.23		35.230
2	Henrik Fagerli Rukke	(Norway)	35.36	+0.13	35.360
3	Kjeld Nuis	(Netherlands)	35.47	+0.24	35.470
4	Håvard Holmefjord Lorentzen	(Norway)	35.58	+0.35	35.580
5	David Bosa	(Italy)	35.60	+0.37	35.600
6	Artyom Kuznetsov	(Russia)	35.62	+0.39	35.620
7	Piotr Michalski	(Poland)	35.64	+0.41	35.640
8	Joel Dufter	(Germany)	35.79	+0.56	35.790
9	Artur Nogal	(Poland)	35.85	+0.62	35.850
10	Bjørn Magnussen	(Norway)	35.86	+0.63	35.860
11	Nico Ihle	(Germany)	35.98	+0.75	35.980
12	Thomas Krol	(Netherlands)	36.00	+0.77	36.000
13	Aleksey Yesin	(Russia)	36.15	+0.92	36.150
14	Victor Lobas	(Russia)	36.21	+0.98	36.210
15	Mirko Giacomo Nenzi	(Italy)	36.45	+1.22	36.450
16	Marten Liiv	(Estonia)	36.47	+1.24	36.470
17	Ignat Golovatsiuk	(Belarus)	36.50	+1.27	36.500
18	Cornelius Kersten	(United Kingdom)	36.87	+1.64	36.870
19	Samuli Suomalainen	(Finland)	36.96	+1.73	36.960
20	Hendrik Dombek	(Germany)	37.20	+1.97	37.200

===== 1000 metres =====
Rank	Skater	Nat.	Time	Behind	Points
1	Kai Verbij	(Netherlands)	1:08.97 TR		34.485
2	Victor Lobas	(Russia)	1:09.80	+0.83	34.900
3	Håvard Holmefjord Lorentzen	(Norway)	1:09.88	+0.91	34.940
4	Nico Ihle	(Germany)	1:10.34	+1.37	35.170
5	Henrik Fagerli Rukke	(Norway)	1:10.57	+1.60	35.285
6	Aleksey Yesin	(Russia)	1:10.62	+1.65	35.310
7	Joel Dufter	(Germany)	1:10.66	+1.69	35.330
8	Ignat Golovatsiuk	(Belarus)	1:10.67	+1.70	35.335
9	Artyom Kuznetsov	(Russia)	1:10.75	+1.78	35.375
10	Piotr Michalski	(Poland)	1:11.01	+2.04	35.505
11	Marten Liiv	(Estonia)	1:11.17	+2.20	35.585
12	Mirko Giacomo Nenzi	(Italy)	1:11.34	+2.37	35.670
13	Bjørn Magnussen	(Norway)	1:11.63	+2.66	35.815
14	Artur Nogal	(Poland)	1:12.14	+3.17	36.070
15	David Bosa	(Italy)	1:12.17	+3.20	36.085
16	Samuli Suomalainen	(Finland)	1:12.56	+3.59	36.280
17	Hendrik Dombek	(Germany)	1:12.84	+3.87	36.420
18	Cornelius Kersten	(United Kingdom)	1:12.96	+3.99	36.480
19	Thomas Krol	(Netherlands)	1:53.88	+44.91	56.940
-	Kjeld Nuis	(Netherlands)	DQ		-

==== Day 2 ====
===== 500 metres =====
Rank	Skater	Nat.	Time	Behind	Points
1	Kai Verbij	(Netherlands)	34.93		34.930
2	Håvard Holmefjord Lorentzen	(Norway)	35.10	+0.17	35.100
3	Artyom Kuznetsov	(Russia)	35.27	+0.34	35.270
4	Kjeld Nuis	(Netherlands)	35.41	+0.48	35.410
5	David Bosa	(Italy)	35.44	+0.51	35.440
6	Henrik Fagerli Rukke	(Norway)	35.45	+0.52	35.450
7	Nico Ihle	(Germany)	35.46	+0.53	35.460
8	Aleksey Yesin	(Russia)	35.61	+0.68	35.610
9	Piotr Michalski	(Poland)	35.68	+0.75	35.680
10	Mirko Giacomo Nenzi	(Italy)	35.73	+0.80	35.730
11	Ignat Golovatsiuk	(Belarus)	35.77	+0.84	35.770
11	Thomas Krol	(Netherlands)	35.77	+0.84	35.770
13	Artur Nogal	(Poland)	35.83	+0.90	35.830
14	Joel Dufter	(Germany)	36.00	+1.07	36.000
14	Victor Lobas	(Russia)	36.00	+1.07	36.000
16	Hendrik Dombek	(Germany)	36.41	+1.48	36.410
17	Marten Liiv	(Estonia)	36.56	+1.63	36.560
18	Samuli Suomalainen	(Finland)	36.71	+1.78	36.710
19	Cornelius Kersten	(United Kingdom)	36.84	+1.91	36.840
-	Bjørn Magnussen	(Norway)	DNF		-

===== 1000 metres =====
Rank	Skater	Nat.	Time	Behind	Points
1	Thomas Krol	(Netherlands)	1:08.68 TR		34.340
2	Kai Verbij	(Netherlands)	1:08.88	+0.20	34.440
3	Nico Ihle	(Germany)	1:09.45	+0.77	34.725
4	Joel Dufter	(Germany)	1:09.57	+0.89	34.785
5	Håvard Holmefjord Lorentzen	(Norway)	1:09.60	+0.92	34.800
6	Victor Lobas	(Russia)	1:09.77	+1.09	34.885
7	Aleksey Yesin	(Russia)	1:09.81	+1.13	34.905
8	David Bosa	(Italy)	1:09.94	+1.26	34.970
9	Piotr Michalski	(Poland)	1:10.07	+1.39	35.035
10	Artyom Kuznetsov	(Russia)	1:10.12	+1.44	35.060
10	Henrik Fagerli Rukke	(Norway)	1:10.12	+1.44	35.060
12	Mirko Giacomo Nenzi	(Italy)	1:10.44	+1.76	35.220
13	Ignat Golovatsiuk	(Belarus)	1:10.54	+1.86	35.270
14	Artur Nogal	(Poland)	1:10.64	+1.96	35.320
15	Marten Liiv	(Estonia)	1:11.92	+3.24	35.960
16	Hendrik Dombek	(Germany)	1:12.65	+3.97	36.325
17	Samuli Suomalainen	(Finland)	1:12.72	+4.04	36.360
-	Cornelius Kersten	(United Kingdom)	WDR		-

==== Final ranking ====
Rank	Skater	Nat.	500 m	1000 m	500 m	1000 m	Points	Behind
1st place, gold medalist(s)	Kai Verbij	(Netherlands)	35.23 (1)	1:08.97 (1)	34.93 (1)	1:08.88 (2)	139.085	
2nd place, silver medalist(s)	Håvard Holmefjord Lorentzen	(Norway)	35.58 (4)	1:09.88 (3)	35.10 (2)	1:09.60 (5)	140.420	+1.34
3rd place, bronze medalist(s)	Henrik Fagerli Rukke	(Norway)	35.36 (2)	1:10.57 (5)	35.45 (6)	1:10.12 (10)	141.155	+2.07
4	Artyom Kuznetsov	(Russia)	35.62 (6)	1:10.75 (9)	35.27 (3)	1:10.12 (10)	141.325	+2.24
5	Nico Ihle	(Germany)	35.98 (11)	1:10.34 (4)	35.46 (7)	1:09.45 (3)	141.335	+2.25
6	Piotr Michalski	(Poland)	35.64 (7)	1:11.01 (10)	35.68 (9)	1:10.07 (9)	141.860	+2.78
7	Joel Dufter	(Germany)	35.79 (8)	1:10.66 (7)	36.00 (14)	1:09.57 (4)	141.905	+2.82
8	Aleksey Yesin	(Russia)	36.15 (13)	1:10.62 (6)	35.61 (8)	1:09.81 (7)	141.975	+2.89
9	Victor Lobas	(Russia)	36.21 (14)	1:09.80 (2)	36.00 (14)	1:09.77 (6)	141.995	+2.91
10	David Bosa	(Italy)	35.60 (5)	1:12.17 (15)	35.44 (5)	1:09.94 (8)	142.095	+3.01
11	Ignat Golovatsiuk	(Belarus)	36.50 (17)	1:10.67 (8)	35.77 (11)	1:10.54 (13)	142.875	+3.79
12	Mirko Giacomo Nenzi	(Italy)	36.45 (15)	1:11.34 (12)	35.73 (10)	1:10.44 (12)	143.070	+3.99
13	Artur Nogal	(Poland)	35.85 (9)	1:12.14 (14)	35.83 (13)	1:10.64 (14)	143.070	+3.99
14	Marten Liiv	(Estonia)	36.47 (16)	1:11.17 (11)	36.56 (17)	1:11.92 (15)	144.575	+5.49
15	Samuli Suomalainen	(Finland)	36.96 (19)	1:12.56 (16)	36.71 (18)	1:12.72 (17)	146.310	+7.23
16	Hendrik Dombek	(Germany)	37.20 (20)	1:12.84 (17)	36.41 (16)	1:12.65 (16)	146.355	+7.27
17	Thomas Krol	(Netherlands)	36.00 (12)	1:53.88 (19)	35.77 (11)	1:08.68 (1)	163.050	+23.97
18	Cornelius Kersten	(United Kingdom)	36.87 (18)	1:12.96 (18)	36.84 (19)	WDR	-	-
19	Bjørn Magnussen	(Norway)	35.86 (10)	1:11.63 (13)	DNF		-	-
20	Kjeld Nuis	(Netherlands)	35.47 (3)	DQ	35.41 (4)		-	-

=== Women's championships ===
==== Day 2 ====
===== 500 metres =====
Rank	Skater	Nat.	Time	Behind	Points
1	Vanessa Herzog	(Austria)	37.61 TR		37.610
2	Olga Fatkulina	(Russia)	38.13	+0.52	38.130
3	Daria Kachanova	(Russia)	38.15	+0.54	38.150
4	Jutta Leerdam	(Netherlands)	38.55	+0.94	38.550
5	Letitia de Jong	(Netherlands)	38.63	+1.02	38.630
5	Sanneke de Neeling	(Netherlands)	38.63	+1.02	38.630
7	Hege Bøkko	(Norway)	38.77	+1.16	38.770
8	Irina Kuznetsova	(Russia)	38.92	+1.31	38.920
9	Kaja Ziomek	(Poland)	39.04	+1.43	39.040
10	Gabriele Hirschbichler	(Germany)	39.19	+1.58	39.190
11	Noemi Bonazza	(Italy)	39.24 (PR)	+1.63	39.240
12	Andżelika Wójcik	(Poland)	39.31	+1.70	39.310
13	Anna Nifontova	(Belarus)	39.63	+2.02	39.630

===== 1000 metres =====
Rank	Skater	Nat.	Time	Behind	Points
1	Daria Kachanova	(Russia)	1:15.79		37.895
2	Jutta Leerdam	(Netherlands)	1:15.82	+0.03	37.910
3	Letitia de Jong	(Netherlands)	1:15.88	+0.09	37.940
4	Olga Fatkulina	(Russia)	1:16.04	+0.25	38.020
5	Vanessa Herzog	(Austria)	1:16.54	+0.75	38.270
6	Sanneke de Neeling	(Netherlands)	1:16.62	+0.83	38.310
7	Irina Kuznetsova	(Russia)	1:18.02	+2.23	39.010
8	Gabriele Hirschbichler	(Germany)	1:18.28	+2.49	39.140
9	Hege Bøkko	(Norway)	1:18.50	+2.71	39.250
10	Noemi Bonazza	(Italy)	1:18.81	+3.02	39.405
11	Kaja Ziomek	(Poland)	1:18.84	+3.05	39.420
12	Andżelika Wójcik	(Poland)	1:19.49	+3.70	39.745
13	Anna Nifontova	(Belarus)	1:20.56	+4.77	40.280

==== Day 3 ====
===== 500 metres =====
Rank	Skater	Nat.	Time	Behind	Points
1	Vanessa Herzog	(Austria)	37.62		37.620
2	Olga Fatkulina	(Russia)	38.05	+0.43	38.050
3	Daria Kachanova	(Russia)	38.22	+0.60	38.220
4	Jutta Leerdam	(Netherlands)	38.45	+0.83	38.450
5	Sanneke de Neeling	(Netherlands)	38.66	+1.04	38.660
6	Letitia de Jong	(Netherlands)	38.80	+1.18	38.800
7	Irina Kuznetsova	(Russia)	38.91	+1.29	38.910
8	Hege Bøkko	(Norway)	38.95	+1.33	38.950
8	Kaja Ziomek	(Poland)	38.95	+1.33	38.950
10	Noemi Bonazza	(Italy)	39.45	+1.83	39.450
11	Andżelika Wójcik	(Poland)	39.58	+1.96	39.580
12	Anna Nifontova	(Belarus)	39.72	+2.10	39.720
13	Gabriele Hirschbichler	(Germany)	39.76	+2.14	39.760

===== 1000 metres =====
Rank	Skater	Nat.	Time	Behind	Points
1	Daria Kachanova	(Russia)	1:15.21 TR, PR		37.605
2	Jutta Leerdam	(Netherlands)	1:15.76	+0.54	37.880
3	Vanessa Herzog	(Austria)	1:15.89	+0.67	37.945
4	Olga Fatkulina	(Russia)	1:16.46	+1.24	38.230
5	Sanneke de Neeling	(Netherlands)	1:16.53	+1.31	38.265
6	Letitia de Jong	(Netherlands)	1:17.57	+2.35	38.785
7	Irina Kuznetsova	(Russia)	1:18.23	+3.01	39.115
8	Hege Bøkko	(Norway)	1:18.55	+3.33	39.275
9	Noemi Bonazza	(Italy)	1:18.67	+3.46	39.335
10	Kaja Ziomek	(Poland)	1:18.76	+3.54	39.380
11	Gabriele Hirschbichler	(Germany)	1:18.99	+3.77	39.495
12	Andżelika Wójcik	(Poland)	1:20.17	+4.95	40.085
13	Anna Nifontova	(Belarus)	1:22.39	+7.17	41.195

==== Final ranking ====
Rank	Skater	Nat.	500 m	1000 m	500 m	1000 m	Points	Behind
1st place, gold medalist(s)	Vanessa Herzog	(Austria)	37.61 (1)	1:16.54 (5)	37.62 (1)	1:15.89 (3)	151.445	
2nd place, silver medalist(s)	Daria Kachanova	(Russia)	38.15 (3)	1:15.79 (1)	38.22 (3)	1:15.21 (1)	151.870	+0.85
3rd place, bronze medalist(s)	Olga Fatkulina	(Russia)	38.13 (2)	1:16.04 (4)	38.05 (2)	1:16.46 (4)	152.430	+1.97
4	Jutta Leerdam	(Netherlands)	38.55 (4)	1:15.82 (2)	38.45 (4)	1:15.76 (2)	152.790	+2.69
5	Sanneke de Neeling	(Netherlands)	38.63 (5)	1:16.62 (6)	38.66 (5)	1:16.53 (5)	153.865	+4.84
6	Letitia de Jong	(Netherlands)	38.63 (5)	1:15.88 (3)	38.80 (6)	1:17.57 (6)	154.155	+5.42
7	Irina Kuznetsova	(Russia)	38.92 (8)	1:18.02 (7)	38.91 (7)	1:18.23 (7)	155.955	+9.02
8	Hege Bøkko	(Norway)	38.77 (7)	1:18.50 (9)	38.95 (8)	1:18.55 (8)	156.245	+9.60
9	Kaja Ziomek	(Poland)	39.04 (9)	1:18.84 (11)	38.95 (8)	1:18.76 (10)	156.790	+10.69
10	Noemi Bonazza	(Italy)	39.24 (11)	1:18.81 (10)	39.45 (10)	1:18.67 (9)	157.430	+11.97
11	Gabriele Hirschbichler	(Germany)	39.19 (10)	1:18.28 (8)	39.76 (13)	1:18.99 (11)	157.585	+12.28
12	Andżelika Wójcik	(Poland)	39.31 (12)	1:19.49 (12)	39.58 (11)	1:20.17 (12)	158.720	+14.55
13	Anna Nifontova	(Belarus)	39.63 (13)	1:20.56 (13)	39.72 (12)	1:22.39 (13)	160.825	+18.76

== Participating nations ==
- Austria (1)
- Belarus (3)
- Czech Republic (3)
- Denmark (1)
- Estonia (2)
- Finland (1)
- Germany (8)
- United Kingdom (1)
- Italy (7)
- Latvia (1)
- Netherlands (12)
- Norway (10)
- Poland (7)
- Russia (11)

== See also ==
- 2019 World Allround Speed Skating Championships
- 2019 World Sprint Speed Skating Championships
