= 2016 World Sprint Speed Skating Championships – Men =

Men at the 2016 World Sprint Speed Skating Championships
- Venue: Korea National Training Center, Seoul
- Date: 27–28 February
- Competitors: 31 from 14 nations
- Winning time: 139.245

Medalists
gold medal	Pavel Kulizhnikov	Russia
silver medal	Kjeld Nuis	Netherlands
bronze medal	Kai Verbij	Netherlands

The Men's event of the 2016 World Sprint Speed Skating Championships was held on 27–28 February 2016.

== Results ==
=== 500 m ===
The race was started on 27 February 2016 at 17:52.

Rank	Pair	Lane	Name	Country	Time	Diff
1	15	i	Pavel Kulizhnikov	RUS	34.76	
2	16	i	Kai Verbij	NED	34.94	+0.18
3	16	o	Mika Poutala	FIN	34.95	+0.19
4	11	i	Kim Tae-yun	KOR	35.01	+0.25
5	7	o	Nico Ihle	GER	35.05	+0.29
6	14	i	Alex Boisvert-Lacroix	CAN	35.13	+0.37
7	6	o	Piotr Michalski	POL	35.16	+0.40
8	12	o	Aleksey Yesin	RUS	35.22	+0.46
9	13	i	Ronald Mulder	NED	35.23	+0.47
9	6	i	Gao Tingyu	CHN	35.23	+0.47
11	10	i	Espen Aarnes Hvammen	NOR	35.26	+0.50
11	10	o	Roman Krech	KAZ	35.26	+0.50
13	13	o	Ruslan Murashov	RUS	35.27	+0.51
14	9	o	Kjeld Nuis	NED	35.29	+0.53
15	11	o	Ryohei Haga	JPN	35.39	+0.63
16	8	i	Pekka Koskela	FIN	35.42	+0.66
16	15	o	Laurent Dubreuil	CAN	35.42	+0.66
18	7	i	Mirko Giacomo Nenzi	ITA	35.47	+0.71
19	14	o	Mitchell Whitmore	USA	35.48	+0.72
20	3	o	Kim Jin-su	KOR	35.49	+0.73
21	5	o	Artur Nogal	POL	35.51	+0.75
22	5	i	Daniel Greig	AUS	35.65	+0.89
23	8	o	Xie Jiaxuan	CHN	35.66	+0.90
24	4	i	Yuto Fujino	JPN	35.77	+1.01
25	4	o	Joey Mantia	USA	35.78	+1.02
26	12	i	Mu Zhongsheng	CHN	35.87	+1.11
27	2	o	Shani Davis	USA	35.88	+1.12
28	2	i	Håvard Holmefjord Lorentzen	NOR	35.97	+1.21
29	9	i	David Bosa	ITA	36.15	+1.39
30	1	i	Christoffer Fagerli Rukke	NOR	36.68	+1.92
31	3	i	Denis Kuzin	KAZ	DSQ	

=== 1000 m ===
The race was started on 27 February 2016 at 19:34.

Rank	Pair	Lane	Name	Country	Time	Diff
1	16	o	Kjeld Nuis	NED	1:09.28	
2	16	i	Pavel Kulizhnikov	RUS	1:09.87	+0.59
3	11	i	Nico Ihle	GER	1:10.15	+0.87
4	15	i	Shani Davis	USA	1:10.39	+1.11
5	9	o	Kim Jin-su	KOR	1:10.44	+1.16
6	15	o	Kai Verbij	NED	1:10.45	+1.17
7	12	o	Kim Tae-yun	KOR	1:10.47	+1.19
8	14	o	Mika Poutala	FIN	1:10.76	+1.48
9	13	i	Joey Mantia	USA	1:10.82	+1.54
10	14	i	Aleksey Yesin	RUS	1:10.87	+1.59
11	12	i	Piotr Michalski	POL	1:10.89	+1.61
12	7	i	Ruslan Murashov	RUS	1:10.98	+1.70
13	8	i	Ronald Mulder	NED	1:10.99	+1.71
14	7	o	Yuto Fujino	JPN	1:11.05	+1.77
15	2	o	Laurent Dubreuil	CAN	1:11.23	+1.95
16	10	i	Denis Kuzin	KAZ	1:11.35	+2.07
17	5	o	Daniel Greig	AUS	1:11.38	+2.10
18	13	o	Mitchell Whitmore	USA	1:11.39	+2.11
19	4	i	Håvard Holmefjord Lorentzen	NOR	1:11.46	+2.18
20	11	o	Roman Krech	KAZ	1:11.47	+2.19
21	6	i	Mirko Giacomo Nenzi	ITA	1:11.94	+2.66
22	9	i	Espen Aarnes Hvammen	NOR	1:11.98	+2.70
23	4	o	Artur Nogal	POL	1:12.23	+2.95
23	10	o	Alex Boisvert-Lacroix	CAN	1:12.23	+2.95
25	8	o	Pekka Koskela	FIN	1:12.65	+3.37
26	3	o	Mu Zhongsheng	CHN	1:12.81	+3.53
27	6	o	Xie Jiaxuan	CHN	1:13.09	+3.81
28	5	i	David Bosa	ITA	1:13.41	+4.13
29	1	i	Gao Tingyu	CHN	1:14.45	+5.17
30	2	i	Ryohei Haga	JPN	1:14.83	+5.55
31	3	i	Christoffer Fagerli Rukke	NOR	1:48.55	+39.27

=== 500 m ===
The race was started on 28 February 2016 at 17:50.

Rank	Pair	Lane	Name	Country	Time	Diff
1	16	o	Pavel Kulizhnikov	RUS	34.63	
2	10	i	Ruslan Murashov	RUS	35.06	+0.43
3	14	i	Mika Poutala	FIN	35.10	+0.47
4	13	o	Ronald Mulder	NED	35.13	+0.50
5	9	i	Roman Krech	KAZ	35.15	+0.52
6	15	o	Kai Verbij	NED	35.21	+0.58
7	13	i	Piotr Michalski	POL	35.22	+0.59
8	14	o	Kim Tae-yun	KOR	35.23	+0.60
9	6	i	Mitchell Whitmore	USA	35.24	+0.61
10	12	i	Aleksey Yesin	RUS	35.33	+0.70
11	11	o	Espen Aarnes Hvammen	NOR	35.35	+0.72
11	6	o	Pekka Koskela	FIN	35.35	+0.72
13	15	i	Nico Ihle	GER	35.36	+0.73
14	12	o	Alex Boisvert-Lacroix	CAN	35.39	+0.76
15	11	i	Kim Jin-su	KOR	35.49	+0.86
16	16	i	Kjeld Nuis	NED	35.52	+0.89
17	8	i	Laurent Dubreuil	CAN	35.53	+0.90
18	4	o	Gao Tingyu	CHN	35.55	+0.92
19	8	o	Mirko Giacomo Nenzi	ITA	35.59	+0.96
20	3	o	David Bosa	ITA	35.60	+0.97
21	4	i	Artur Nogal	POL	35.70	+1.07
22	7	i	Shani Davis	USA	35.71	+1.08
23	2	i	Ryohei Haga	JPN	35.77	+1.14
24	3	i	Xie Jiaxuan	CHN	35.86	+1.23
25	9	o	Daniel Greig	AUS	35.89	+1.26
26	5	o	Mu Zhongsheng	CHN	35.93	+1.30
27	7	o	Håvard Holmefjord Lorentzen	NOR	36.05	+1.42
28	5	i	Joey Mantia	USA	36.10	+1.47
29	10	o	Yuto Fujino	JPN	36.31	+1.68
30	2	o	Christoffer Fagerli Rukke	NOR	36.53	+1.70
31	1	o	Denis Kuzin	KAZ	36.80	+2.17

=== 1000 m ===
The race was started on 28 February 2016 at 19:34.

Rank	Pair	Lane	Name	Country	Time	Diff
1	10	i	Kjeld Nuis	NED	1:09.09	
2	12	o	Pavel Kulizhnikov	RUS	1:09.84	+0.75
3	5	o	Shani Davis	USA	1:09.95	+0.86
4	12	i	Kai Verbij	NED	1:10.09	+1.00
5	7	o	Aleksey Yesin	RUS	1:10.16	+1.07
6	11	o	Nico Ihle	GER	1:10.27	+1.18
6	7	i	Kim Jin-su	KOR	1:10.27	+1.18
8	9	i	Kim Tae-yun	KOR	1:10.37	+1.28
9	9	o	Piotr Michalski	POL	1:10.53	+1.44
10	6	i	Mitchell Whitmore	USA	1:10.61	+1.52
11	3	o	Joey Mantia	USA	1:10.64	+1.55
12	8	o	Ronald Mulder	NED	1:10.75	+1.66
13	11	i	Mika Poutala	FIN	1:10.86	+1.77
14	2	o	Håvard Holmefjord Lorentzen	NOR	1:11.07	+1.98
15	10	o	Ruslan Murashov	RUS	1:11.20	+2.11
16	8	i	Roman Krech	KAZ	1:11.26	+2.17
17	6	o	Espen Aarnes Hvammen	NOR	1:11.80	+2.71
17	1	i	Yuto Fujino	JPN	1:11.80	+2.71
19	2	i	Daniel Greig	AUS	1:11.83	+2.74
20	5	i	Laurent Dubreuil	CAN	1:11.96	+2.87
21	3	i	Pekka Koskela	FIN	1:12.00	+2.91
22	4	o	Mirko Giacomo Nenzi	ITA	1:12.11	+3.02
23	4	i	Alex Boisvert-Lacroix	CAN	1:12.55	+3.46
24	1	o	Gao Tingyu	CHN	1:13.30	+4.21

=== Overall standings ===
After all events.

Rank	Name	Country	Points	Diff
1st place, gold medalist(s)	Pavel Kulizhnikov	RUS	139.245	
2nd place, silver medalist(s)	Kjeld Nuis	NED	139.995	+0.75
3rd place, bronze medalist(s)	Kai Verbij	NED	140.420	+1.18
4	Nico Ihle	GER	140.620	+1.38
5	Kim Tae-yun	KOR	140.660	+1.42
6	Mika Poutala	FIN	140.860	+1.62
7	Aleksey Yesin	RUS	141.065	+1.82
8	Piotr Michalski	POL	141.090	+1.85
9	Ronald Mulder	NED	141.230	+1.99
10	Kim Jin-su	KOR	141.335	+2.09
11	Ruslan Murashov	RUS	141.420	+2.18
12	Mitchell Whitmore	USA	141.720	+2.48
13	Shani Davis	USA	141.760	+2.52
14	Roman Krech	KAZ	141.775	+2.53
15	Espen Aarnes Hvammen	NOR	142.500	+3.26
16	Laurent Dubreuil	CAN	142.545	+3.30
17	Joey Mantia	USA	142.610	+3.37
18	Alex Boisvert-Lacroix	CAN	142.910	+3.67
19	Mirko Giacomo Nenzi	ITA	143.085	+3.84
20	Pekka Koskela	FIN	143.095	+3.85
21	Daniel Greig	AUS	143.145	+3.90
22	Håvard Holmefjord Lorentzen	NOR	143.285	+4.04
23	Yuto Fujino	JPN	143.505	+4.26
24	Gao Tingyu	CHN	144.655	+5.41
25	Artur Nogal	POL	—	
26	Xie Jiaxuan	CHN	—	
27	Mu Zhongsheng	CHN	—	
28	David Bosa	ITA	—	
29	Ryohei Haga	JPN	—	
30	Christoffer Fagerli Rukke	NOR	—	
31	Denis Kuzin	KAZ	—	
