= 2022 European Speed Skating Championships – Men's 1000 metres =

Men's 1000 metres at the 2022 European Speed Skating Championships
- Venue: Thialf
- Location: Heerenveen, Netherlands
- Dates: 7 January
- Competitors: 20 from 9 nations
- Winning time: 1:07.77

Medalists
gold medal	Thomas Krol	Netherlands
silver medal	Kjeld Nuis	Netherlands
bronze medal	Kai Verbij	Netherlands

The men's 1000 metres competition at the 2022 European Speed Skating Championships was held on 7 January 2022.

== Results ==
The race was started at 20:42.

Rank	Pair	Lane	Name	Country	Time	Diff
1st place, gold medalist(s)	10	i	Thomas Krol	Netherlands	1:07.77	
2nd place, silver medalist(s)	9	o	Kjeld Nuis	Netherlands	1:07.86	+0.09
3rd place, bronze medalist(s)	9	i	Kai Verbij	Netherlands	1:07.94	+0.17
4	8	i	Cornelius Kersten	Great Britain	1:08.48	+0.71
5	6	i	Joel Dufter	Germany	1:08.69	+0.92
6	5	o	Piotr Michalski	Poland	1:08.73	+0.96
7	10	o	Ignat Golovatsiuk	Belarus	1:08.75	+0.98
8	8	o	Håvard Holmefjord Lorentzen	Norway	1:08.89	+1.12
9	5	i	David Bosa	Italy	1:09.22	+1.45
10	7	i	Moritz Klein	Germany	1:09.37	+1.60
11	4	i	Henrik Fagerli Rukke	Norway	1:09.47	+1.70
12	2	o	Nico Ihle	Germany	1:09.50	+1.73
13	2	i	Bjørn Magnussen	Norway	1:09.57	+1.80
14	6	o	Damian Żurek	Poland	1:09.66	+1.89
15	7	o	Mathias Vosté	Belgium	1:09.69	+1.92
16	3	i	Victor Rudenko	Belarus	1:10.27	+2.50
17	4	o	Mirko Giacomo Nenzi	Italy	1:10.53	+2.76
18	1	o	Artur Nogal	Poland	1:11.03	+3.26
19	1	i	Jeffrey Rosanelli	Italy	1:11.13	+3.36
20	3	o	Konrád Nagy	Hungary	1:11.85	+4.08
