= 2020 European Speed Skating Championships – Men's 1000 metres =

Men's 1000 metres at the 2020 European speed skating championships

Men's 1000 metres at the 2020 European Speed Skating Championships
- Venue: Thialf
- Location: Heerenveen, Netherlands
- Dates: 12 January
- Competitors: 20 from 9 nations
- Winning time: 1:07.09

Medalists
gold medal	Pavel Kulizhnikov	Russia
silver medal	Thomas Krol	Netherlands
bronze medal	Kai Verbij	Netherlands

The men's 1000 metres competition at the 2020 European Speed Skating Championships was held on 12 January 2020.

== Results ==
The race was started at 16:05.

Rank	Pair	Lane	Name	Country	Time	Diff
1st place, gold medalist(s)	6	i	Pavel Kulizhnikov	Russia	1:07.09 TR	
2nd place, silver medalist(s)	8	o	Thomas Krol	Netherlands	1:07.82	+0.73
3rd place, bronze medalist(s)	10	i	Kai Verbij	Netherlands	1:08.38	+1.29
4	9	o	Viktor Mushtakov	Russia	1:08.82	+1.73
5	6	o	Ignat Golovatsiuk	Belarus	1:08.83	+1.74
6	10	o	Dai Dai Ntab	Netherlands	1:08.92	+1.83
7	5	i	Artur Nogal	Poland	1:08.99	+1.90
8	9	i	Håvard Holmefjord Lorentzen	Norway	1:09.12	+2.03
9	5	o	Artem Arefyev	Russia	1:09.25	+2.16
10	8	i	Mathias Vosté	Belgium	1:09.51	+2.42
11	2	o	Mirko Giacomo Nenzi	Italy	1:09.97	+2.88
12	1	o	Stefan Emele	Germany	1:10.07	+2.98
13	4	i	Sebastian Kłosiński	Poland	1:10.08	+2.99
14	3	i	Marten Liiv	Estonia	1:10.09	+3.00
15	7	o	Sindre Henriksen	Norway	1:10.10	+3.01
16	4	o	Alessio Trentini	Italy	1:10.26	+3.17
17	7	i	Jeremias Marx	Germany	1:10.59	+3.50
18	3	o	Henrik Fagerli Rukke	Norway	1:10.68	+3.59
19	2	i	Piotr Michalski	Poland	1:11.54	+4.45
20	1	i	Michael Roth	Germany	1:11.93	+4.84
