= Speed skating at the 2018 Winter Olympics – Men's 500 metres =

Men's 500 metres at the XXIII Olympic Winter Games
- Venue: Gangneung Oval, Gangneung, South Korea
- Date: 19 February
- Competitors: 36 from 17 nations
- Winning time: 34.41 OR

Medalists
1st place, gold medalist(s)		Håvard Holmefjord Lorentzen	Norway
2nd place, silver medalist(s)		Cha Min-kyu	South Korea
3rd place, bronze medalist(s)		Gao Tingyu	China

The men's 500 metres speed skating competition of the 2018 Winter Olympics was held on 19 February 2018 at Gangneung Oval in Gangneung

== Competition schedule ==
All times are Korea Standard Time (UTC+9).

Date	Time	Event
19 February	20:53	Men's 500 m final

== Records ==
Prior to this competition, the existing world, Olympic and track records were as follows.

World record	Pavel Kulizhnikov (RUS)	33.98	Salt Lake City, United States	20 November 2015
Olympic record	Casey FitzRandolph (USA)	34.42	Salt Lake City, United States	11 February 2002
Track record	Jan Smeekens (NED)	34.58		10 February 2017

The following records were set during this competition.

Date	Round	Athlete	Country	Time	Record
19 February	Pair 14	Cha Min-kyu	South Korea	34.42	TR
19 February	Pair 16	Håvard Holmefjord Lorentzen	Norway	34.41	OR, TR

OR = Olympic record, TR = track record

== Results ==
The race was started at 20:53.

Rank	Pair	Lane	Name	Country	Time	Time behind	Notes
1st place, gold medalist(s)	16	O	Håvard Holmefjord Lorentzen	Norway	34.41	—	OR, TR
2nd place, silver medalist(s)	14	O	Cha Min-kyu	South Korea	34.42	+0.01	TR
3rd place, bronze medalist(s)	12	I	Gao Tingyu	China	34.65	+0.24	
4	18	O	Mika Poutala	Finland	34.68	+0.27	
5	17	I	Daichi Yamanaka	Japan	34.78	+0.37	
6	12	O	Joji Kato	Japan	34.831	+0.42	
7	16	I	Ronald Mulder	Netherlands	34.839	+0.42	
8	15	O	Nico Ihle	Germany	34.89	+0.48	
9	17	O	Kai Verbij	Netherlands	34.90	+0.49	
10	10	O	Jan Smeekens	Netherlands	34.930	+0.52	
11	18	I	Alex Boisvert-Lacroix	Canada	34.934	+0.52	
12	13	I	Kim Jun-ho	South Korea	35.01	+0.60	
13	15	I	Artur Waś	Poland	35.02	+0.61	
14	1	I	Tsubasa Hasegawa	Japan	35.08	+0.67	
15	10	I	Mitchell Whitmore	United States	35.13	+0.72	
16	11	O	Mo Tae-bum	South Korea	35.154	+0.74	
17	14	I	Gilmore Junio	Canada	35.158	+0.74	
18	13	O	Laurent Dubreuil	Canada	35.16	+0.75	
19	9	O	Pekka Koskela	Finland	35.192	+0.78	
20	6	O	Pedro Causil	Colombia	35.196	+0.78	
21	1	O	Daniel Greig	Australia	35.22	+0.81	
22	5	I	Ignat Golovatsiuk	Belarus	35.23	+0.82	
23	7	O	Jonathan Garcia	United States	35.31	+0.90	
24	6	I	Stanislav Palkin	Kazakhstan	35.33	+0.92	
25	2	O	Artyom Krikunov	Kazakhstan	35.34	+0.93	
26	2	I	Kimani Griffin	United States	35.38	+0.97	
27	5	O	Yang Tao	China	35.41	+1.00	
28	8	I	Henrik Fagerli Rukke	Norway	35.500	+1.09	
29	3	O	Joel Dufter	Germany	35.506	+1.09	
30	4	I	Mirko Giacomo Nenzi	Italy	35.51	+1.10	
31	4	O	Xie Jiaxuan	China	35.545	+1.13	
32	3	I	Mathias Vosté	Belgium	35.546	+1.13	
33	11	I	Piotr Michalski	Poland	35.64	+1.23	
34	7	I	Sung Ching-yang	Chinese Taipei	35.86	+1.45	
35	9	I	Roman Krech	Kazakhstan	35.92	+1.51	
36	8	O	Artur Nogal	Poland	58.71	+24.30	
