= 2019 World Single Distances Speed Skating Championships – Men's 1000 metres =

Men's 1000 metres at the 2019 World Single Distances Speed Skating Championships
- Venue: Max Aicher Arena
- Location: Inzell, Germany
- Dates: 9 February
- Competitors: 24 from 13 nations
- Winning time: 1:07.39

Medalists
gold medal	Kai Verbij	Netherlands
silver medal	Thomas Krol	Netherlands
bronze medal	Kjeld Nuis	Netherlands

The Men's 1000 metres competition at the 2019 World Single Distances Speed Skating Championships was held on 9 February 2019.

== Results ==
The race was started at 14:20.

Rank	Pair	Lane	Name	Country	Time	Diff
1st place, gold medalist(s)	11	i	Kai Verbij	Netherlands	1:07.39	
2nd place, silver medalist(s)	10	o	Thomas Krol	Netherlands	1:07.67	+0.28
3rd place, bronze medalist(s)	12	i	Kjeld Nuis	Netherlands	1:07.81	+0.42
4	10	i	Håvard Holmefjord Lorentzen	Norway	1:07.85	+0.46
5	4	i	Denis Yuskov	Russia	1:08.10	+0.71
6	12	o	Pavel Kulizhnikov	Russia	1:08.12	+0.74
7	11	o	Viktor Mushtakov	Russia	1:08.37	+0.99
8	8	o	Nico Ihle	Germany	1:08.40	+1.01
9	6	i	Masaya Yamada	Japan	1:08.49	+1.10
10	1	i	Yuto Fujino	Japan	1:08.56	+1.17
11	9	i	Joel Dufter	Germany	1:08.66	+1.27
12	7	i	Joey Mantia	United States	1:08.68	+1.29
13	3	i	Laurent Dubreuil	Canada	1:08.86	+1.47
14	5	o	Ning Zhongyan	China	1:08.87	+1.48
15	4	o	Mathias Vosté	Belgium	1:08.88	+1.49
16	7	o	Tatsuya Shinhama	Japan	1:08.99	+1.60
17	1	o	Kim Jin-su	South Korea	1:09.01	+1.62
18	9	o	Ignat Golovatsiuk	Belarus	1:09.07	+1.68
19	8	i	Kim Tae-yun	South Korea	1:09.42	+2.03
20	2	o	Piotr Michalski	Poland	1:09.44	+2.05
21	6	o	Antoine Gélinas-Beaulieu	Canada	1:09.61	+2.22
22	3	o	Kimani Griffin	United States	1:10.05	+2.66
23	5	i	Allan Dahl Johansson	Norway	1:10.11	+2.72
24	2	i	Marten Liiv	Estonia	1:10.35	+2.96
