= 2020 World Single Distances Speed Skating Championships – Men's 1000 metres =

Men's 1000 metres at the 2020 World Single Distances Speed Skating Championships
- Venue: Utah Olympic Oval
- Location: Salt Lake City, United States
- Dates: February 15
- Competitors: 24 from 11 nations
- Winning time: 1:05.69

Medalists
gold medal	Pavel Kulizhnikov	Russia
silver medal	Kjeld Nuis	Netherlands
bronze medal	Laurent Dubreuil	Canada

The Men's 1000 metres competition at the 2020 World Single Distances Speed Skating Championships was held on February 15, 2020.

== Results ==
The race was started at 13:36.

Rank	Pair	Lane	Name	Country	Time	Diff
1st place, gold medalist(s)	4	o	Pavel Kulizhnikov	Russia	1:05.69 WR	
2nd place, silver medalist(s)	11	i	Kjeld Nuis	Netherlands	1:06.73	+1.04
3rd place, bronze medalist(s)	12	i	Laurent Dubreuil	Canada	1:06.76	+1.07
4	9	o	Håvard Holmefjord Lorentzen	Norway	1:07.00	+1.31
5	5	o	Masaya Yamada	Japan	1:07.03	+1.34
6	12	o	Kai Verbij	Netherlands	1:07.05	+1.36
7	8	i	Nico Ihle	Germany	1:07.10	+1.41
8	4	i	Ruslan Murashov	Russia	1:07.13	+1.44
9	7	i	Antoine Gélinas-Beaulieu	Canada	1:07.25	+1.56
10	9	i	Ignat Golovatsiuk	Belarus	1:07.32	+1.63
11	10	i	Viktor Mushtakov	Russia	1:07.34	+1.75
12	5	i	Joey Mantia	United States	1:07.51	+1.82
13	7	o	Kim Jin-su	South Korea	1:07.52	+1.83
14	6	i	Ryota Kojima	Japan	1:07.55	+1.86
15	2	i	Yamato Matsui	Japan	1:07.59	+1.90
16	11	o	Ning Zhongyan	China	1:07.76	+2.07
17	3	o	Alexandre St-Jean	Canada	1:07.87	+2.18
18	8	o	Mathias Vosté	Belgium	1:07.95	+2.26
19	3	i	Jeremias Marx	Germany	1:08.064	+2.37
20	6	o	Kim Tae-yun	South Korea	1:08.069	+2.37
21	2	o	Kim Jun-ho	South Korea	1:08.16	+2.47
22	1	o	Odin By Farstad	Norway	1:08.60	+2.91
23	1	i	Hendrik Dombek	Germany	1:08.84	+3.15
	10	o	Thomas Krol	Netherlands	Disqualified	
