= 2017 World Single Distances Speed Skating Championships – Men's 1000 metres =

Men's 1000 metres at the 2017 World Single Distances Speed Skating Championships
- Venue: Gangneung Oval
- Location: Gangneung, South Korea
- Dates: 11 February
- Competitors: 24 from 11 nations
- Winning time: 1:08.26

Medalists
gold medal	Kjeld Nuis	Netherlands
silver medal	Vincent De Haître	Canada
bronze medal	Kai Verbij	Netherlands

The Men's 1000 metres competition at the 2017 World Single Distances Speed Skating Championships was held on 11 February 2017.

== Results ==
The race was started at 18:45.

Rank	Pair	Lane	Name	Country	Time	Diff
1st place, gold medalist(s)	10	o	Kjeld Nuis	Netherlands	1:08.26	
2nd place, silver medalist(s)	11	o	Vincent De Haître	Canada	1:08.54	+0.28
3rd place, bronze medalist(s)	10	i	Kai Verbij	Netherlands	1:08.78	+0.52
4	11	i	Nico Ihle	Germany	1:08.89	+0.63
5	12	o	Shani Davis	United States	1:08.98	+0.72
6	12	i	Håvard Holmefjord Lorentzen	Norway	1:09.12	+0.86
7	4	i	Denis Yuskov	Russia	1:09.19	+0.93
8	3	o	Laurent Dubreuil	Canada	1:09.43	+1.17
9	3	i	Alexey Yesin	Russia	1:09.48	+1.22
10	7	o	Joey Mantia	United States	1:09.53	+1.27
11	2	i	Denis Kuzin	Kazakhstan	1:09.55	+1.29
12	8	o	Alexandre St-Jean	Canada	1:09.56	+1.30
13	5	o	Kim Tae-yun	South Korea	1:09.62	+1.36
14	9	i	Takuro Oda	Japan	1:09.63	+1.37
15	9	o	Jonathan Garcia	United States	1:09.67	+1.41
16	5	i	Shunsuke Nakamura	Japan	1:09.77	+1.51
17	4	o	Joel Dufter	Germany	1:09.79	+1.53
18	2	o	Ronald Mulder	Netherlands	1:09.94	+1.68
19	6	o	Ruslan Murashov	Russia	1:10.11	+1.85
20	1	i	Sindre Henriksen	Norway	1:10.12	+1.86
21	8	i	Mika Poutala	Finland	1:10.19	+1.93
22	1	o	Shota Nakamura	Japan	1:10.74	+2.48
—	7	i	Kim Jin-su	South Korea	DSQ	
—	6	i	Sebastian Kłosiński	Poland	DSQ	
