= 2018–19 ISU Speed Skating World Cup – World Cup 2 =

The second competition weekend of the 2018–19 ISU Speed Skating World Cup was held at the Tomakomai Highland Sport Center in Tomakomai, Japan, from Friday, 23 November, until Sunday, 25 November 2018.

== Schedule ==
The detailed event schedule:

Date	Events	Division
Friday, 23 November	500 m women (1); 500 m men (1)	B
Friday, 23 November	Mass start men semifinal 1 men Mass start men semifinal 2 men Team pursuit women Team pursuit men	
Friday, 23 November	500 m women (1); 500 m men (1)	A
Saturday, 24 November	500 m women (2); 500 m men (2); 1500 m women 1500 m men	B
Saturday, 24 November	500 m women (2); 1500 m women 1500 m men 500 m men (2)	A
Saturday, 24 November	Mass start final women Mass start final men	
Sunday, 25 November	1000 m women 1000 m men 3000 m women 5000 m men	B
Sunday, 25 November	1000 m women 1000 m men 3000 m women 5000 m men	A
Sunday, 25 November	Team sprint women Team sprint men	

== Medal summary ==
=== Men's events ===
Event	Race #	Gold	Time	Silver	Time	Bronze	Time	Report
500 m	1	(Japan) Tatsuya Shinhama	35.451	(Japan) Yuma Murakami	35.535	(Netherlands) Jan Smeekens	35.587	
500 m	2	(Japan) Tatsuya Shinhama	35.203	(Russia) Viktor Mushtakov	35.445	(Japan) Yuma Murakami	35.534	
1000 m		(Netherlands) Kjeld Nuis	1:10.453	(Netherlands) Kai Verbij	1:10.722	(Netherlands) Thomas Krol	1:10.916	
1500 m		(Netherlands) Kjeld Nuis	1:47.611	(Netherlands) Patrick Roest	1:48.200	(Netherlands) Thomas Krol	1:48.393	
5000 m		(Belgium) Bart Swings	6:34.857	(Norway) Sverre Lunde Pedersen	6:36.865	(Netherlands) Patrick Roest	6:37.327	
Mass start		(Belarus) Vitaly Mikhailov	68 ^{A}	(South Korea) Um Cheon-ho	40 ^{A}	(Belgium) Bart Swings	20 ^{A}	
Team pursuit		Netherlands; Patrick Roest; Marcel Bosker; Douwe de Vries	3:45.870	Norway; Sverre Lunde Pedersen; Håvard Bøkko; Sindre Henriksen	3:47.150	Japan; Seitaro Ichinohe; Ryosuke Tsuchiya; Shane Williamson	3:47.170	
Team sprint		Russia; Ruslan Murashov; Aleksey Yesin; Viktor Mushtakov	1:23.540	Netherlands; Dai Dai Ntab; Kai Verbij; Kjeld Nuis	1:23.640	Canada; Christopher Fiola; Laurent Dubreuil; Antione Gelinas-Beaulieu	1:24.230	

^{A} In mass start, race points are accumulated during the race based on results of the intermediate sprints and the final sprint. The skater with most race points is the winner.

=== Women's events ===
Event	Race #	Gold	Time	Silver	Time	Bronze	Time	Report
500 m	1	(Japan) Nao Kodaira	38.031	(Austria) Vanessa Herzog	38.529	(Russia) Daria Kachanova	38.820	
500 m	2	(Japan) Nao Kodaira	38.263	(Austria) Vanessa Herzog	38.569	(United States) Brittany Bowe	38.997	
1000 m		(Japan) Nao Kodaira	1:17.318	(United States) Brittany Bowe	1:17.656	(Austria) Vanessa Herzog	1:17.779	
1500 m		(Netherlands) Ireen Wüst	1:58.742	(Japan) Miho Takagi	1:59.282	(United States) Brittany Bowe	1:59.828	
3000 m		(Canada) Isabelle Weidemann	4:10.185	(Czech Republic) Martina Sáblíková	4:13.005	(Italy) Francesca Lollobrigida	4:13.472	
Mass start		(South Korea) Kim Bo-reum	60 ^{A}	(Italy) Francesca Lollobrigida	40 ^{A}	(Canada) Ivanie Blondin	20 ^{A}	
Team pursuit		Japan; Nana Takagi; Miho Takagi; Ayano Sato	3:02.370	Canada; Ivanie Blondin; Isabelle Weidemann; Keri Morrison	3:05.950	Russia; Evgeniia Lalenkova; Elizaveta Kazelina; Natalia Voronina	3:06.690	
Team sprint		Netherlands; Janine Smit; Letitia de Jong; Jutta Leerdam	1:32.100	Italy; Francesca Bettrone; Noemi Bonazza; Francesca Lollobrigida	1:32.120	Canada; Kaylin Irvine; Heather Mclean; Ivanie Blondin	1:32.810	

^{A} In mass start, race points are accumulated during the race based on results of the intermediate sprints and the final sprint. The skater with most race points is the winner.
