= 2019 World Single Distances Speed Skating Championships – Men's team sprint =

Men's team sprint at the 2019 World Single Distances Speed Skating Championships
- Venue: Max Aicher Arena
- Location: Inzell, Germany
- Dates: 7 February
- Competitors: 24 from 8 nations
- Teams: 8
- Winning time: 1:19.05

Medalists
gold medal	Ronald Mulder; Kai Verbij; Kjeld Nuis	Netherlands
silver medal	Kim Jun-ho; Cha Min-kyu; Kim Tae-yun	South Korea
bronze medal	Ruslan Murashov; Pavel Kulizhnikov; Viktor Mushtakov	Russia

The Men's team sprint competition at the 2019 World Single Distances Speed Skating Championships was held on 7 February 2019.

== Results ==
The race was started at 16:17.

Rank	Pair	Lane	Country	Time	Diff
1st place, gold medalist(s)	4	s	Netherlands	1:19.05	
2nd place, silver medalist(s)	2	c	South Korea	1:20.00	+0.95
3rd place, bronze medalist(s)	3	s	Russia	1:20.10	+1.05
4	1	c	Germany	1:20.59	+1.54
5	4	c	Poland	1:22.76	+3.71
6	2	s	Belarus	1:23.51	+4.46
—	1	s	China	Disqualified	
—	3	c	Norway	Disqualified	
