= Daichi Yamanaka =

Japanese speed skater (born 1990)

Personal information
- Born: 1 May 1990 (age 36) Kawakami, Japan
- Height: 5 ft 9 in (175 cm)
- Weight: 165 lb (75 kg)

Sport
- Country: Japan
- Sport: Speed skating

Achievements and titles
- Highest world ranking: 9 (500 m)

Daichi Yamanaka (山中 大地) (born 1 May 1990) is a Japanese speed skater.

Yamanaka competed at the 2014 Winter Olympics for Japan. In the 1000 metres he finished 36th overall.

Yamanaka competed at the 2018 Winter Olympics for Japan. In the 500 metres he finished 5th overall and in the 1000 metres he finished 24th overall.

Yamanaka made his World Cup debut in December 2012. As of September 2014, Yamanaka's top World Cup finish is 6th in a 1000 m B race at Nagano in 2012–13. His best overall finish in the World Cup is 50th, in the 1000 metres in 2012–13.

As of May 2018, Yamanaka's top World Cup finish is 2nd in a 500 m A race at Stavanger in 2017–18. His best overall finish in the World Cup is 9th, in the 2017–18 ISU Speed Skating World Cup – Men's 500 metres.
