= Kai Verbij =

Dutch speed skater (born 1994)

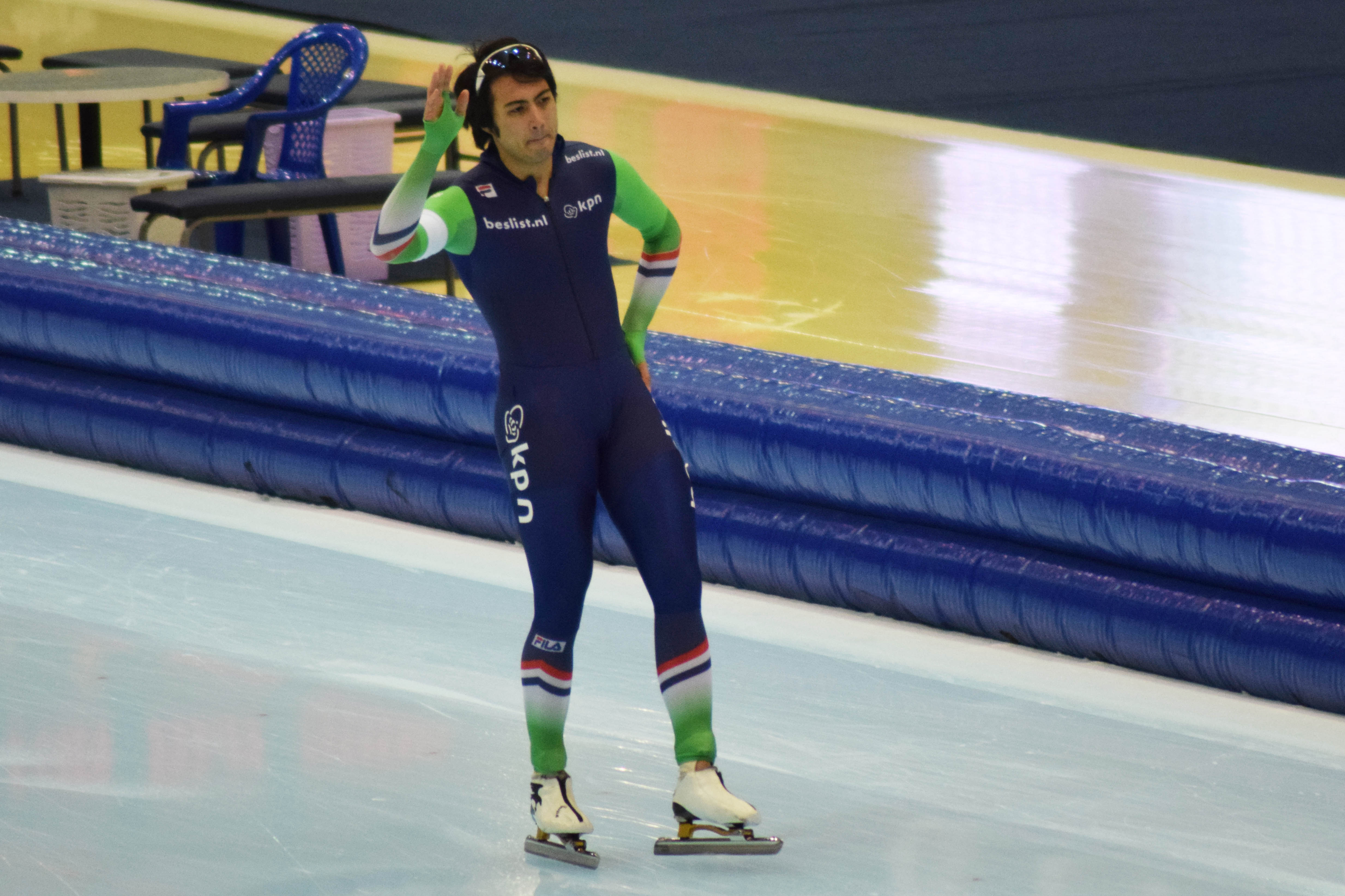
- Verbij in 2016

Personal information
- Nationality: Dutch
- Born: 25 September 1994 (age 31) Leiderdorp, Netherlands
- Height: 1.83 m (6 ft 0 in)
- Weight: 81 kg (179 lb)

Sport
- Country: Netherlands
- Sport: Speed skating
- Event: 1000 m
- Club: Team Jumbo-Visma
Medal record
Men's speed skating
Representing the Netherlands
World Sprint Championships
Gold medal – first place	2017 Calgary	Sprint
Silver medal – second place	2022 Hamar	Sprint
Bronze medal – third place	2016 Seoul	Sprint
Bronze medal – third place	2018 Changchun	Sprint
Bronze medal – third place	2022 Hamar	team sprint
World Single Distance Championships
Gold medal – first place	2019 Inzell	1000 m
Gold medal – first place	2019 Inzell	team sprint
Gold medal – first place	2020 Salt Lake City	team sprint
Gold medal – first place	2021 Heerenveen	1000 m
Bronze medal – third place	2017 Gangneung	1000 m
European Championships
Gold medal – first place	2017 Heerenveen	Sprint
Gold medal – first place	2019 Collalbo	Sprint
Gold medal – first place	2022 Heerenveen	team sprint
Bronze medal – third place	2020 Heerenveen	1000 m
Bronze medal – third place	2022 Heerenveen	1000 m

Kai Verbij (born 25 September 1994) is a Dutch speed skater who is specialized in the sprint distances. His mother is Japanese, while his father is Dutch.

== Career ==
Together with Ronald Mulder and Stefan Groothuis, Verbij won the team sprint event at the 2015–16 ISU Speed Skating World Cup event in Calgary on 14 November 2015. In January 2016 he won the title at the KNSB Dutch Sprint Championships.

== Records ==
=== Personal records ===
Personal records
Speed skating
Event	Result	Date	Location	Notes
500 meter	34.13	9 December 2017	Salt Lake City	
1000 meter	1:06.34	9 March 2019	Salt Lake City	
1500 meter	1:45.41	22 March 2015	Calgary	
3000 meter	3:53.70	9 December 2012	Inzell	
5000 meter	6:56.25	18 December 2011	Inzell	

=== World records ===
Nr.	Event	Points total	Date	Location	Notes
1.	Sprint combination	136.065	25–26 February 2017	Calgary	

== Tournament overview ==
Season	Dutch Championships Single Distances	Dutch Championships Sprint	Dutch Championships Allround	European Championships Sprint	World Championships Sprint	World Championships Single Distances	Olympic Games	World Cup GWC	World Championships Junior	European Championships Single Distances
2011–12	HEERENVEEN 21st 500m 20th 1000m	HEERENVEEN 12th 500m 12th 1000m 13th 500m 13th 1000m 12th overall							OBIHIRO (silver) 500m 16th 3000m (bronze) 1500m 18th 5000m 8th overall 10th 1000m 5th 1500m 17th 5000m (bronze) team pursuit	
2012–13	HEERENVEEN 14th 500m 18th 1000m 12th 1500m	GRONINGEN 15th 500m 13th 1000m 17th 500m 11th 1000m 13th overall	HEERENVEEN 6th 500m 22nd 5000m 9th 1500m DNQ 10000m 15th overall						COLLALBO 5th 500m (silver) 1000m 4th 1500m 6th team pursuit	
2013–14	HEERENVEEN 15th 500m 12th 1000m 14th 1500m								BJUGN (gold) 500m (gold) 1000m (silver) 1500m 4th team pursuit	
2014–15	HEERENVEEN 7th 500m 5th 1000m 7th 1500m	GRONINGEN 8th 500m 8th 1000m 11th 500m 9th 1000m 6th overall						41st 500m 13th 1000m 34th 1500m		
2015–16	HEERENVEEN (gold) 500m (silver) 1000m	HEERENVEEN 4th 500m (gold) 1000m (silver) 500m (gold) 1000m (gold) overall			SEOUL (silver) 500m 6th 1000m 6th 500m 4th 1000m (bronze) overall	KOLOMNO 23rd 500m 7th 1000m		7th 500m 4th 1000m		
2016–17	HEERENVEEN 5th 500m (gold) 1000m			HEERENVEEN 4th 500m (silver) 1000m (silver) 500m (bronze) 1000m (gold) overall	CALGARY 9th 500m (bronze) 1000m 4th 500m 9th 1000m (gold) overall	GANGNEUNG (bronze) 1000m		4th 500m (bronze) 1000m		
2017–18	HEERENVEEN (bronze) 500m (gold) 1000m				CHANGCHUN 7th 500m (bronze) 1000m 11th 500m (bronze) 1000m (bronze) overall		GANGNEUNG 9th 500m 6th 1000m	7th 500m (bronze) 1000m		
2018–19	HEERENVEEN 5th 500m (bronze) 1000m			COLLALBO (gold) 500m (gold) 1000m (gold) 500m (silver) 1000m (gold) overall	HEERENVEEN (silver) 500m 10th 1000m (bronze) 500m 6th 1000m 5th overall	INZELL (gold) team sprint (gold) 1000m		13th 500m (silver) 1000m		
2019–20	HEERENVEEN (bronze) 500m (silver) 1000m				HAMAR 9th 500m 8th 1000m 5th 500m 5th 1000m 4th overall	SALT LAKE CITY 10th 500m 6th 1000m (gold) team sprint		12th 500m (silver) 1000m (gold) team sprint		HEERENVEEN 6th 500m (bronze) 1000m
2020–21	HEERENVEEN (bronze) 500m (silver) 1000m	HEERENVEEN 4th 500m 4th 1000m 4th 500m (silver) 1000m (silver) overall		HEERENVEEN DNF 500m (silver) 1000m (gold) 500m DNQ 1000m NC overall		HEERENVEEN 4th 500m (gold) 1000m		25th 500m (gold) 1000m		
2021–22	HEERENVEEN (gold) 500m (gold) 1000m				HAMAR 4th 500m 4th 1000m 6th 500m (bronze) 1000m (silver) overall (bronze) team sprint		BEIJING 14th 500m 30th 1000m	17th 500m 5th 1000m		HEERENVEEN 4th 500m (bronze) 1000m
2022–23		HEERENVEEN (silver) 500m 5th 1000m 5th 500m 7th 1000m (bronze) overall		HAMAR 4th 500m 4th 1000m (bronze) 500m 4th 1000m 4th overall				47th 500m 41st 1000m		

== World Cup overview ==
	Season	500 meter										
2014–2015	6th(b)	6th(b)	–	–	–	–	–	–	–	–	–	–
2015–2016	14th	12th	4th	16th	14th	3rd place, bronze medalist(s)	5th	7th	3rd place, bronze medalist(s)	4th	8th	8th
2016–2017	3rd place, bronze medalist(s)	16th	4th	20th	15th	10th	11th	3rd place, bronze medalist(s)	3rd place, bronze medalist(s)	4th		
2017–2018	3rd place, bronze medalist(s)	4th	4th	12th	9th	6th	2nd place, silver medalist(s)	–	–	5th	6th	
2018–2019	12th	4th	15th	4th	4th	10th	DNS	4th	–	–	–	
2019–2020	5th	8th	14th	15th	9th	DQ	9th					
2020–2021	DNF	2nd(b)	7th	–								
2021–2022	8th	7th	8th	16th	11th	9th	–	–	7th	–		
2022–2023	–	–	9th(b)	–	–	–						

	Season	1000 meter					
2014–2015	12th	4th	10th	12th	–	–	–
2015–2016	7th	6th	3rd place, bronze medalist(s)	7th	5th	–	2nd place, silver medalist(s)
2016–2017	5th	18th	DNS	4th	2nd place, silver medalist(s)	1st place, gold medalist(s)	11th
2017–2018	2nd place, silver medalist(s)	2nd place, silver medalist(s)	1st place, gold medalist(s)	4th	–	–	2nd place, silver medalist(s)
2018–2019	5th	2nd place, silver medalist(s)	2nd place, silver medalist(s)	–	1st place, gold medalist(s)	3rd place, bronze medalist(s)	
2019–2020	5th	3rd place, bronze medalist(s)	2nd place, silver medalist(s)	8th	3rd place, bronze medalist(s)		
2020–2021	2nd place, silver medalist(s)	1st place, gold medalist(s)					
2021–2022	7th	2nd place, silver medalist(s)	5th	–	5th		
2022–2023	–	–	7th	–	–	–	

	Season	1500 meter				
2014–2015	–	–	2nd(b)	–	–	–
2015–2016						
2016–2017						
2017–2018						
2018–2019						
2019–2020						
2020–2021						
2021–2022						
2022–2023						

	Season	Team sprint		
2014–2015				
2015–2016				
2016–2017				
2017–2018				
2018–2019				
2019–2020	1st place, gold medalist(s)	–	1st place, gold medalist(s)	–
2020–2021				
2021–2022				
2022–2023				
