= Cha Min-kyu =

South Korean speed skater

Personal information
- Nationality: South Korean
- Born: 16 March 1993 (age 33) Anyang, Gyeonggi, South Korea
- Height: 1.79 m (5 ft 10 in)
- Weight: 74 kg (163 lb)

Sport
- Country: South Korea
- Sport: Speed skating
- Event: 500 m
- Club: Dongducheon City Hall
Medal record
Representing South Korea
Olympic Games
Silver medal – second place	2018 Pyeongchang	500 m
Silver medal – second place	2022 Beijing	500 m
World Single Distances Championships
Silver medal – second place	2019 Inzell	Team sprint
World Sprint Championships
Bronze medal – third place	2020 Hamar	Sprint
Four Continents Championships
Gold medal – first place	2020 Milwaukee	Team sprint
Silver medal – second place	2022 Calgary	500 m
Silver medal – second place	2022 Calgary	Team sprint
Asian Winter Games
Silver medal – second place	2025 Harbin	1000 m
Silver medal – second place	2025 Harbin	Team sprint
Bronze medal – third place	2017 Sapporo	500 m

Cha Min-kyu (Korean: 차민규, born 16 March 1993) is a South Korean speed skater who competes internationally.

Cha participated at the 2018 Winter Olympics and won a silver medal in the 500 metres race. He set the Olympic record for the event with a time of 34.42 seconds but had his record broken moments later by the eventual winner, Håvard Lorentzen who beat him by 0.01. He also competed at the 2022 Winter Olympics and won the silver in the 500 metres event with time of 34.39 seconds, which was only 0.07 seconds behind the gold medalist and new Olympic record holder, Gao Tingyu of China.

== Personal records ==
Personal records
Speed skating
Event	Result	Date	Location	Notes
500 m	34.03	10 March 2019	Utah Olympic Oval, Salt lake city	Current South Korean record.
1000 m	1:08.73	29 February 2020	Vikingskipet, Hamar	
1500 m	1:51.33	10 September 2016	Olympic Oval, Calgary	
3000 m	4:09.69	20 January 2016	Seoul	
