= Yuma Murakami =

Japanese speed skater (born 1992)

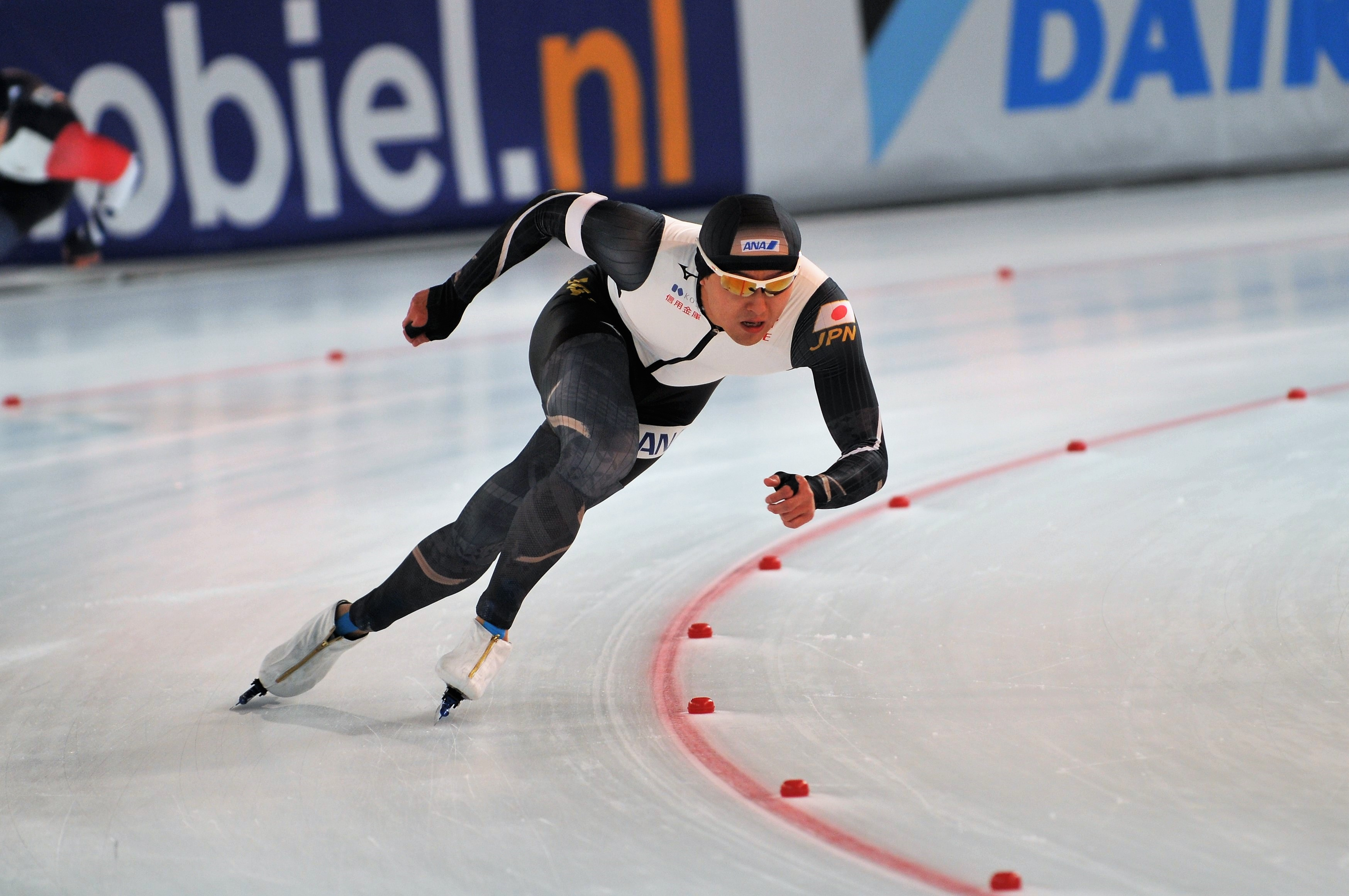
- Murakami at the 2022 World Cup in Stavanger, Norway

Personal information
- Born: 12 December 1992 (age 33) Obihiro, Hokkaidō, Japan
- Height: 1.75 m (5 ft 9 in)
- Weight: 77 kg (170 lb)

Sport
- Country: Japan
- Sport: Speed skating
Medal record
Men's speed skating
Representing Japan
Four Continents Championships
Silver medal – second place	2023 Quebec	500 m

Yuma Murakami (born 12 December 1992) is a Japanese speed skater who is specialized in the sprint distances.

== Career ==
At the fifth competition weekend of the 2016–17 ISU Speed Skating World Cup, held in Berlin, Germany Murakami finished in second place in the first 500m event following Nico Ihle. At the second competition weekend of the 2018–19 ISU Speed Skating World Cup in Tomakomai, Japan he finished second in the first 500m event behind Tatsuya Shinhama and third in the second 500m.

== Personal records ==
Personal records
Speed skating
Event	Result	Date	Location	Notes
500 m	34.11	9 March 2019	Utah Olympic Oval, Salt Lake City	
1000 m	1:10.94	27 October 2018	M-Wave, Nagano	
1500 m	1:55.79	12 February 2016	M-Wave, Nagano	
