= Gao Tingyu =

Chinese speed skater (born 1997)

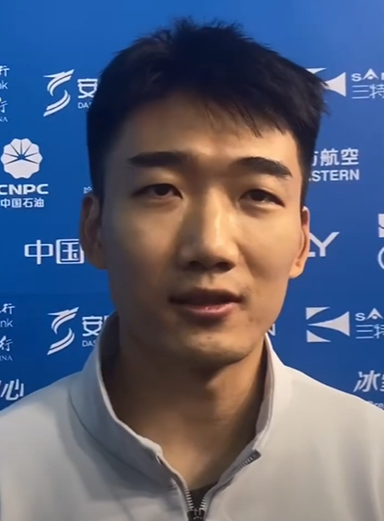
- Gao in 2025

Personal information
- Nationality: Chinese
- Born: 15 December 1997 (age 28) Yichun, China
- Height: 1.80 m (5 ft 11 in)
- Weight: 71 kg (157 lb)

Sport
- Country: China
- Event: 500 m
- Club: Heilongjiang Province Ice Training Centre
Medal record
Representing China
Olympic Games
Gold medal – first place	2022 Beijing	500 m
Bronze medal – third place	2018 Pyeongchang	500 m
World Single Distances Championships
Silver medal – second place	2020 Salt Lake City	Team sprint
Asian Winter Games
Gold medal – first place	2017 Sapporo	500 m
Gold medal – first place	2025 Harbin	100 m
Gold medal – first place	2025 Harbin	500 m
Gold medal – first place	2025 Harbin	Team sprint

Gao Tingyu
- Chinese: 高亭宇
Transcriptions
Standard Mandarin
- Hanyu Pinyin: Gāo Tíngyǔ
- IPA: [káʊ tʰǐŋ ỳ]

Gao Tingyu (born 15 December 1997, Chinese: 高亭宇) is a Chinese speed skater who is the former Olympic record holder and champion in the Men's 500m event. He had served as one of the flag bearers for Team China at both the 2022 Beijing Winter Olympic's opening ceremony, and its closing ceremony.

== Career ==
Gao made his Olympic debut at the 2018 PyeongChang Olympics, winning a bronze medal in the Men's 500m speed skating event. In doing so, Gao had become the first male speed skater from China to win a medal in Olympic speed skating.

Gao competed in the 500m event at the 2022 Beijing Winter Olympics, where he won a gold and also set the new Olympic record with a time of 34.32 seconds, making him the first Chinese man to win a gold medal in Olympic speedskating.

On April 8, 2022, he was designated by the State Council as an individual who rendered exceptional services to the Beijing Winter Olympic and Paralympic Games.

On February 8, 2025, during the Harbin Asian Winter Games men's 100-meter speed skating, Gao Tingyu achieved a time of 9.35 seconds, securing the gold medal and setting a new Asian record as well as a new Asian Winter record.

Olympic Games
Preceded by Zhou Yang	Flagbearer for China (with Zhao Dan); Beijing 2022	Succeeded by Ning Zhongyan & Zhang Chutong
Preceded by Wu Dajing	Flagbearer for China at the Olympics closing ceremony (with Xu Mengtao); Beijing 2022	Succeeded by Su Yiming
