= Cornelius Kersten =

British speed skater (born 1994)

Personal information
- Born: 19 July 1994 (age 31) Haarlem, Netherlands

Sport
- Country: Great Britain
- Sport: Speed skating
- Event(s): 500 m, 1000 m, 1500 m
Medal record
Men's speed skating
Representing Great Britain
World Single Distances Championships
Bronze medal – third place	2023 Heerenveen	1000 m

Cornelius Kersten (born 19 July 1994) is a British speed skater who represented Great Britain at the 2022 Winter Olympics.

== Biography ==
Kersten was born in the Netherlands and grew up in Heemstede, the son of an English mother and a Dutch father. He could not reach the top among the Dutch juniors in speed skating, and decided to represent England. Since there is no long track skating rink in England, he moved to Calgary, Canada, and joined a team there. Later, he moved to the Netherlands, and lives in Heerenveen with his partner Ellia Smeding, who is also a Dutch-English speed skater; they operate a coffee brewing business to finance their skating careers.

== Career ==
At the 2023 World Single Distances Speed Skating Championships, Kersten won a bronze medal in the 1000 metres events, becoming the first British representative to win a medal at the single distance world championships.

== Personal records ==
Personal records
Speed skating
Event	Result	Date	Location	Notes
500-meter	34.82	3 December 2021	Salt Lake City	
1000-meter	1:07.33	12 December 2021	Calgary	
1500-meter	1:44.29	11 December 2021	Calgary	
