= Sebastian Kłosiński =

Polish speed skater

Medal record

Men's speed skating

Representing Poland

European Championships
Bronze medal – third place	2018 Kolomna	Team sprint

Sebastian Kłosiński (born 4 August 1992, in Warsaw) is a Polish speed skater.

== Career ==
Kłosiński won the bronze medal in the Team sprint event at the 2018 European Speed Skating Championships in Kolomna together with Piotr Michalski and Artur Nogal. He is trained by Tuppu Nieminen, a retired Finnish speed skater.
