= Viktor Mushtakov =

Russian speed skater (born 1996)

Personal information
- Nationality: Russian
- Born: 19 December 1996 (age 29) Barnaul, Russia
- Height: 1.86 m (6 ft 1 in)
- Weight: 84 kg (185 lb)

Sport
- Country: Russia
- Sport: Speed skating
- Event(s): 500 m, team sprint
- Club: Central Sports Army Club
Medal record
Representing Russia
Men's speed skating
World Single Distance Championships
Bronze medal – third place	2019 Inzell	500 m
Bronze medal – third place	2019 Inzell	Team sprint
European Single Distance Championships
Gold medal – first place	2020 Thialf	Team sprint

Viktor Alekseyevich Mushtakov (Russian: Виктор Алексеевич Муштаков; born 19 December 1996) is a Russian speed skater who specializes in the sprint distances.

== Career ==
In 2016 he won the gold medal in the team sprint at the World Junior Championships in Changchun, China.

At the second competition weekend of the 2018–19 ISU Speed Skating World Cup he finished second in the second 500m event behind Tatsuya Shinhama.

He is coached by Dmitry Dorofeyev.

== World Cup podiums ==
Date	Season	Location	Rank	Event
24 November 2018	2018–19	Tomakomai	2nd place, silver medalist(s)	500 m
25 November 2018	2018–19	Tomakomai	1st place, gold medalist(s)	Team sprint
9 December 2018	2018–19	Tomaszów Mazowiecki	3rd place, bronze medalist(s)	Team sprint
6 December 2019	2019–20	Nur-Sultan	1st place, gold medalist(s)	500 m
13 December 2019	2019–20	Nagano	1st place, gold medalist(s)	Team sprint
14 December 2019	2019–20	Nagano	1st place, gold medalist(s)	500 m
7 February 2020	2019–20	Calgary	3rd place, bronze medalist(s)	500 m

== Personal records ==
Personal records
Men's speed skating
Event	Result	Date	Location	Notes
500 m	33.90	12 December 2021	Olympic Oval, Calgary	
1000 m	1:06.98	12 December 2021	Olympic Oval, Calgary	
1500 m	1:50.06	23 October 2019	Kolomna	
3000 m	4:02.16	4 March 2014	Uralskaya Molniya, Chelyabinsk	
5000 m	7:08.60	5 March 2014	Uralskaya Molniya, Chelyabinsk	
