= Daniel Greig =

Australian speed skater

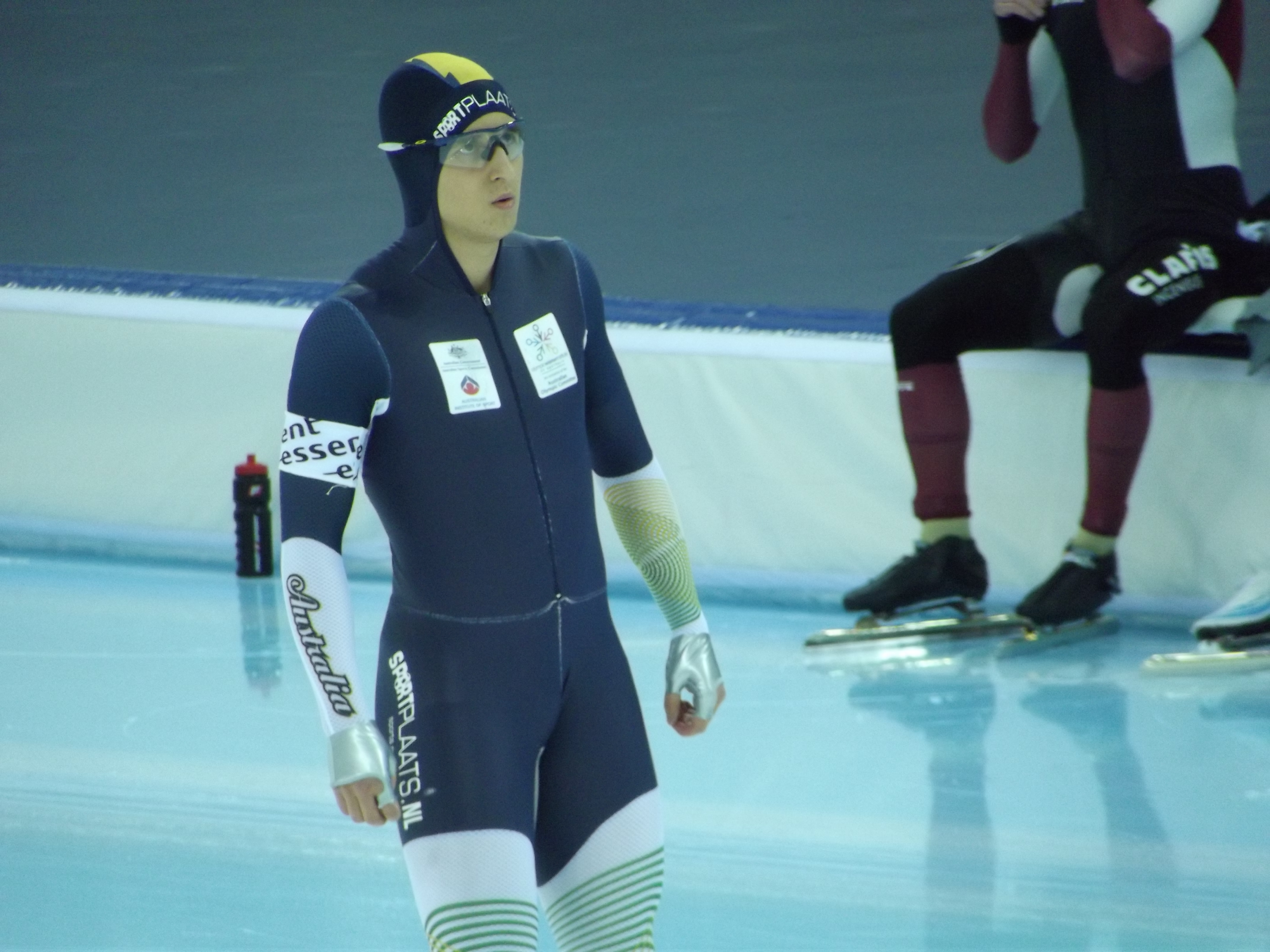
- Greig in 2013

Personal information
- Born: 13 March 1991 (age 35) Adelaide, South Australia
- Height: 172 cm (5 ft 8 in)
- Weight: 69 kg (152 lb)

Sport
- Sport: Speed skating
- Coached by: Desley Hill
Medal record
Men's speed skating
Representing Australia
World Sprint Championships
Bronze medal – third place	2014 Nagano	Sprint

Daniel Greig (born 13 March 1991) is an Australian speed skater. He was selected for Australia as a speed skater during the 2014 Winter Olympics for the men's 500, 1000 and 1500 m events. During the 2014 World Sprint Speed Skating Championships he won a bronze medal.

Greig is Australia's best speed skater, currently holding records in the 500m, 1000m and 1500m events.

Greig's formative years were spent as a world class inline skater. At age 17 he began taking the steps to make the Olympics and moved to the Netherlands to learn how to skate on ice. In 2013 Greig showed his rapid progression in the sport with a strong series of finishes before capping it off in 2014 with a bronze medal at the World Championships in Nagano and competing in the Sochi Winter Olympics.

He currently holds the Australian national record for the 500 and 1000 m.

Grieg studied a Bachelor of Mechanical Engineering (Honours) at Deakin University.
