= Tsubasa Hasegawa =

Japanese speed skater (born 1994)

Personal information
- Born: 8 February 1994 (age 32)

Sport
- Country: Japan
- Sport: Speed skating
Medal record
Men's speed skating
Representing Japan
Winter Universiade
Gold medal – first place	2013 Trentino	500 m

Tsubasa Hasegawa (長谷川 翼, Hasegawa Tsubasa; born 8 February 1994) is a Japanese speed skater who competes internationally.

He participated at the 2018 Winter Olympics.

== Personal records ==
Personal records
Speed skating
Event	Result	Date	Location	Notes
500 m	34.45	26 February 2017	Olympic Oval, Calgary	
1000 m	1:08.49	25 February 2017	M-Olympic Oval, Calgary	
1500 m	1:49.90	16 March 2014	Olympic Oval, Calgary	
3000 m	4:17.40	26 September 2010	Obihiro	
