= Kim Tae-yun (speed skater) =

South Korean speed skater (born 1994)

Personal information
- Nationality: South Korean
- Born: 28 September 1994 (age 31) Seoul, South Korea
- Height: 1.78 m (5 ft 10 in)
- Weight: 75 kg (165 lb)

Sport
- Country: South Korea
- Sport: Speed skating
- Club: Seoul Metropolitan Government

Achievements and titles
- Highest world ranking: 44 (1000 m)
Medal record
Olympic Games
Bronze medal – third place	2018 Pyeongchang	1000 m
World Single Distances Championships
Silver medal – second place	2019 Inzell	Team sprint
Four Continents Championships
Silver medal – second place	2023 Quebec	Team sprint
Bronze medal – third place	2023 Quebec	1000 m
Bronze medal – third place	2024 Salt Lake City	Team sprint

- Kim Tae-yun
- Hangul: 김태윤
- RR: Gim Taeyun
- MR: Kim T'aeyun

Kim Tae-yun (born 28 September 1994) is a South Korean speed skater.

== Career ==
Kim competed at the 2014 Winter Olympics for South Korea. In the 1000 metres he finished 30th overall.

Kim made his World Cup debut in November 2013. As of September 2014, Kim's top World Cup finish is 6th in a 1000m B race at Salt Lake City in 2013–14. His best overall finish in the World Cup is 44th, in the 1000 metres in 2013–14.

At the 2018 Winter Olympics in Pyeongchang, Kim exceeded expectations by winning the bronze medal in the 1000 metres race.
