= David Bosa =

Italian speed skater (born 1992)

Personal information
- Born: 28 April 1992 (age 34) Trento, Italy
- Height: 1.78 m (5 ft 10 in)
- Weight: 76 kg (168 lb)

Sport
- Country: Italy
- Sport: Speed skating
- Club: Fiamme Oro

Achievements and titles
- Highest world ranking: 31 (500m)

David Bosa (born 28 April 1992) is an Italian speed skater.

Bosa competed at the 2014 Winter Olympics for Italy. In the 500 metres he finished 31st overall.

As of September 2014, Bosa's best performance at the World Sprint Speed Skating Championships, was 20th at the 2014 event.

Bosa made his World Cup debut in January 2013. As of September 2014, Bosa's top World Cup finish is 16th in a 500m race at Heerenveen in 2013–14. His best overall finish in the World Cup is 31st, in the 500 metres in 2013–14.
