= Artur Nogal =

Polish speed skater

Medal record

Men's speed skating

Representing Poland

European Championships
Bronze medal – third place	2018 Kolomna	Team sprint

Artur Nogal (born 26 August 1990 in Warsaw) is a Polish speed skater.

== Career ==
He competed at the 2014 Winter Olympics in Sochi, in the 500 meters. Artur won the bronze medal in the Team sprint event at the 2018 European Speed Skating Championships in Kolomna together with Piotr Michalski and Sebastian Kłosiński. He is trained by Tuppu Nieminen, a retired finnish speed skater.
