= Joel Dufter =

German speed skater (born 1995)

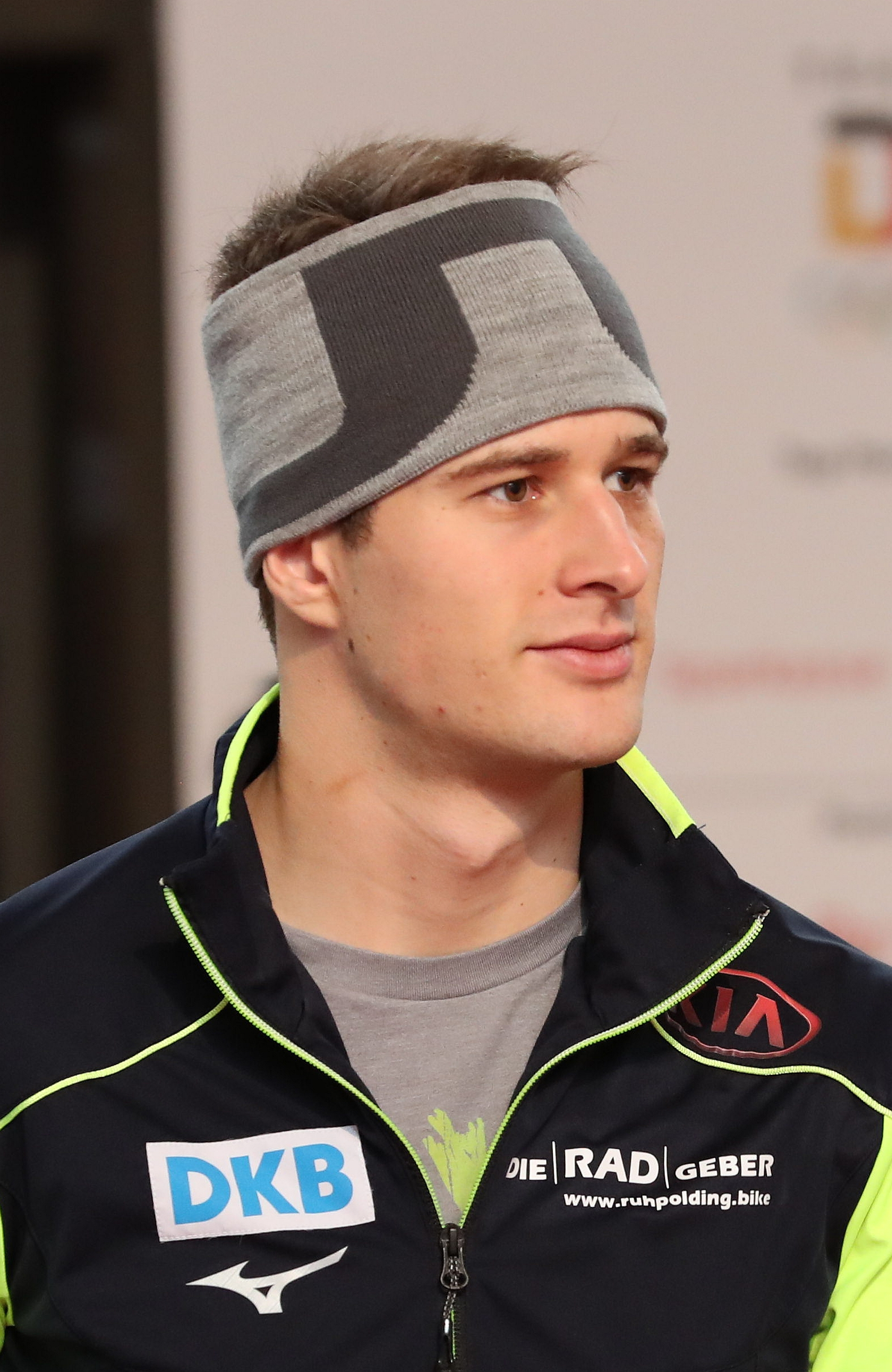
- Dufter in 2018

Personal information
- Nationality: German
- Born: 18 March 1995 (age 31) Traunstein, Germany
- Height: 1.86 m (6 ft 1 in)
- Weight: 83 kg (183 lb)

Sport
- Country: Germany
- Sport: Speed skating
Medal record
Men's speed skating
Representing Germany
European Championships
| Bronze medal – third place | 2021 Heerenven | Sprint |

Joel Dufter (born 18 March 1995) is a German male speed skater. He represented Germany at the 2018 Winter Olympics and competed in the men's 500m event eventually finishing at 29th position. Prior to the Olympic debut, he has participated at the 2015–16 ISU Speed Skating World Cup competing in different events.

He holds the German national record along with Nico Ihle and Hubert Hirschbichler in the men's team sprint event, which was set during the 2015–16 ISU Speed Skating World Cup on 22 November 2015.

== Speed skating ==
=== Personal records ===
Personal records
Speed skating
| Event | Result | Date | Location | Notes |
| 500 m | 34.32 | 5 December 2021 | Utah Olympic Oval, Salt Lake City, USA | German national record |
| 1000 m | 1:06.80 | 9 March 2019 | Utah Olympic Oval, Salt Lake City, USA | German national record |
| 1500 m | 1:47.52 | 10 February 2019 | Max Aicher Arena, Inzell, Germany | |
| 3000 m | 3:57.33 | 17 October 2015 | Max Aicher Arena, Inzell, Germany | |
| 5000 m | 7:04.48 | 24 November 2013 | Sportforum Hohenschönhausen, Berlin, Germany | |
| 10000 m | 15:30.95 | 30 December 2014 | Max Aicher Arena, Inzell, Germany | |

== Tournament overview ==
| Season | German Championships Single Distances | European Championships Sprint | World Championships Sprint | World Championships Single Distances | Olympic Games | World Cup GWC | World Championships Junior |
|---|---|---|---|---|---|---|---|
| 2012–13 | | | | | | | COLLALBO 19th 500m 24th 1000m 43rd 1500m |
| 2013–14 | 7th 500m 7th 1000m | | | | | | |
| 2014–15 | 7th 500m-1 (silver) 500m-2 6th 1000m | | | | | 71st 500m 76th 1500m | |
| 2015–16 | (silver) 500m (silver) 1000m (bronze) 1500m | | | | | 61st 500m 42nd 1000m 75th 1500m 8th Team sprint | |
| 2016–17 | (bronze) 500m (gold) 1000m DQ 1500m | | CALGARY 26th 500m 7th 1000m 20th 500m 8th 1000m 17th overall | GANGNEUNG 17th 1000m | | 47th 500m 12th 1000m (bronze) Team sprint 11th Team pursuit | |
| 2017–18 | (silver) 500m (gold) 1000m (bronze) 1500m | | CHANGCHUN 20th 500m DQ 1000m 22nd 500m DNQ 1000m NC overall | | GANGNEUNG 29th 500m 14th 1000m | 34th 500m 18th 1000m 95th 1500m | |
| 2018–19 | (silver) 500m (gold) 1000m (bronze) 1500m | COLLALBO 8th 500m 7th 1000m 15th 500m 4th 1000m 7th overall | THIALF 15th 500m 7th 1000m 15th 500m 9th 1000m 11th overall | INZELL 11th 1000m 22nd 1500m 4th Team sprint | | 32nd 500m 7th 1000m | |
| 2019–20 | (gold) 500m (silver) 1000m | | HAMAR 12th 500m (silver) 1000m 11th 500m 10th 1000m 8th overall | | | 27th 500m 9th 1000m 12th Team sprint | |

Source German data:

== World Cup overview ==
| Season | 500 meter | | | | | | | | | | | |
|---|---|---|---|---|---|---|---|---|---|---|---|---|
| 2014–2015 | – | – | – | – | 30th(b) | 21st(b) | – | – | – | – | – | – |
| 2015–2016 | 22nd(b) | 22nd(b) | 24th(b) | 22nd(b) | – | 18th(b) | 22nd(b) | 22nd(b) | – | – | | |
| 2016–2017 | – | – | – | – | – | – | 23rd(b) | 18th(b) | 6th(b) | – | | |
| 2017–2018 | 17th(b) | 11th(b) | – | 18th(b) | – | – | – | 8th(b) | 1st(b) | - | | |
| 2018–2019 | 12th(b) | 17th(b) | 11th(b) | 10th(b) | 28th(b) | – | 12th(b) | – | 1st(b) | – | – | |
| 2019–2020 | 19th | 10th(b) | 20th | 9th(b) | 6th(b) | 7th | – | – | | | | |

| Season | 1000 meter | | | | | | |
|---|---|---|---|---|---|---|---|
| 2014–2015 | | | | | | | |
| 2015–2016 | 18th | 18th(b) | 15th(b) | 19th(b) | – | – | |
| 2016–2017 | 13th | 17th | 16th | 5th | 14th | 10th | 8th |
| 2017–2018 | 12th | 9th | – | 19th | 15th | 17th | – |
| 2018–2019 | 6th | 18th | 14th | 6th | 8th | 6th | |
| 2019–2020 | 15th | 7th | 11th | 12th | 8th | | |

| Season | 1500 meter | | | | | |
|---|---|---|---|---|---|---|
| 2014–2015 | – | – | 29th(b) | – | – | – |
| 2015–2016 | – | – | 17th(b) | – | – | – |
| 2016–2017 | – | 36th(b) | – | – | – | – |
| 2017–2018 | | | | | | |
| 2018–2019 | | | | | | |
| 2019–2020 | | | | | | |

| Season | Team sprint | | | |
|---|---|---|---|---|
| 2014–2015 | | | | |
| 2015–2016 | – | 8th | – | – |
| 2016–2017 | 2nd place, silver medalist(s) | 5th | 3rd place, bronze medalist(s) | |
| 2017–2018 | 7th | – | – | – |
| 2018–2019 | 7th | 5th | – | |
| 2019–2020 | 9th | 10th | – | – |

- NC = No classification
- – = Did not participate
- (b) = Division B
- DQ = Disqualified
- DNQ = Did not qualify for final distance
