= Ignat Golovatsiuk =

Belarusian speed skater

Personal information
- Born: 5 May 1997 (age 28) Babruysk, Belarus
- Height: 1.88 m (6 ft 2 in)

Sport
- Country: Belarus
- Sport: Speed skating

Ignat Golovatsiuk (born 5 May 1997) is a Belarusian speed skater who competes internationally.

He participated at the 2018 Winter Olympics.
