= 2019–20 ISU Speed Skating World Cup – World Cup 2 =

Skating competition

The second competition weekend of the 2019–20 ISU Speed Skating World Cup was held at the Ice Arena in Tomaszów Mazowiecki, Poland, from Friday, 22 November, until Sunday, 24 November 2019.

== Medal summary ==
=== Men's events ===
Event	Gold	Time	Silver	Time	Bronze	Time	Report
500 m	(Japan) Tatsuya Shinhama	34.732	(Japan) Yuma Murakami	34.734	(Canada) Laurent Dubreuil	34.975	
1500 m	(Netherlands) Thomas Krol	1:45.768 TR	(Netherlands) Kjeld Nuis	1:45.964	(Russia) Denis Yuskov	1:46.288	
5000 m	(Netherlands) Patrick Roest	6:19.388 TR	(Russia) Danila Semerikov	6:20.469	(Russia) Denis Yuskov	6:24.303	
Mass start^{A}	(United States) Joey Mantia	60	(Netherlands) Jorrit Bergsma	40	(Netherlands) Arjan Stroetinga	20	
Team pursuit	Netherlands; Patrick Roest; Douwe de Vries; Marcel Bosker	3:45.689	Japan; Riku Tsuchiya; Seitaro Ichinohe; Shane Williamson	3:46.725	Russia; Alexander Rumyantsev; Ruslan Zakharov; Danila Semerikov	3:47.285	
Team sprint	Netherlands; Ronald Mulder; Kjeld Nuis; Thomas Krol	1:20.061	China; Wang Shiwei; Lian Ziwen; Ning Zhongyan	1:20.841	Canada; Alex Boisvert-Lacroix; Laurent Dubreuil; David La Rue	1:20.966	

^{A} In mass start, race points are accumulated during the race based on results of the intermediate sprints and the final sprint. The skater with most race points is the winner.

=== Women's events ===
Event	Gold	Time	Silver	Time	Bronze	Time	Report
500 m	(Japan) Nao Kodaira	37.775 TR	(Russia) Olga Fatkulina	37.973	(Russia) Daria Kachanova	38.084	
1500 m	(Netherlands) Ireen Wüst	1:56.627 TR	(Japan) Miho Takagi	1:57.176	(Russia) Evgeniia Lalenkova	1:57.283	
3000 m	(Czech Republic) Martina Sábliková	4:06.133 TR	(Netherlands) Carlijn Achtereekte	4:06.284	(Russia) Natalia Voronina	4:06.614	
Mass start^{A}	(Netherlands) Irene Schouten	61	(Canada) Ivanie Blondin	42	(Japan) Nana Takagi	20	
Team pursuit	Russia; Elizaveta Kazelina; Natalia Voronina; Evgeniia Lalenkova	1:29.950	Netherlands; Ireen Wüst; Antoinette de Jong; Melissa Wijfje	1:29.230	Canada; Ivanie Blondin; Isabelle Weidemann; Béatrice Lamarche	1:30.086	
Team sprint	Russia; Angelina Golikova; Olga Fatkulina; Daria Kachanova	1:27.650	Netherlands; Michelle de Jong; Jutta Leerdam; Sanneke de Neeling	1:29.340	Japan; Konami Soga; Arisa Go; Maki Tsuji	1:29.651	

^{A} In mass start, race points are accumulated during the race based on results of the intermediate sprints and the final sprint. The skater with most race points is the winner.
