= 2018–19 ISU Speed Skating World Cup – World Cup 5 =

The fifth competition weekend of the 2018–19 ISU Speed Skating World Cup was held at the Vikingskipet in Hamar, Norway, from Friday, 1 February, until Sunday, 3 February 2019.

== Schedule ==
The detailed event schedule:

Date	Events	Division
Friday, 1 February	3000 m women 5000 m men	B
Friday, 1 February	3000 m women 5000 m men	A
Saturday, 2 February	500 m women (1); 1000 m women 500 m men (1); 1000 m men	B
Saturday, 2 February	500 m women (1); 1000 m women 500 m men (1); 1000 m men	A
Sunday, 3 February	500 m women (2); 1500 m women 1500 m men 500 m men (2)	B
Sunday, 3 February	500 m women (2); 1500 m women 1500 m men 500 m men (2)	A

== Medal summary ==
=== Men's events ===
Event	Race #	Gold	Time	Silver	Time	Bronze	Time	Report
500 m	1	(Russia) Pavel Kulizhnikov	34.65	(South Korea) Kim Jun-ho	34.72	(Netherlands) Dai Dai Ntab	34.77	
500 m	2	(Russia) Pavel Kulizhnikov	34.79	(Russia) Ruslan Murashov	34.83	(South Korea) Kim Jun-ho	34.85	
1000 m		(Netherlands) Kai Verbij	1:08.47	(Netherlands) Thomas Krol	1:08.53	(Netherlands) Kjeld Nuis	1:08.71	
1500 m		(Russia) Denis Yuskov	1:44.96	(Norway) Håvard Bøkko	1:46.29	(South Korea) Kim Min-seok	1:46.40	
5000 m		(Norway) Sverre Lunde Pedersen	6:16.17	(Russia) Aleksandr Rumyantsev	6:19.25	(Canada) Ted-Jan Bloemen	6:20.45	

=== Women's events ===
Event	Race #	Gold	Time	Silver	Time	Bronze	Time	Report
500 m	1	(Japan) Nao Kodaira	37.25 TR	(Austria) Vanessa Herzog	37.38	(Russia) Angelina Golikova	37.92	
500 m	2	(Austria) Vanessa Herzog	37.61	(Russia) Angelina Golikova	37.90	(Russia) Olga Fatkulina	38.09	
1000 m		(United States) Brittany Bowe	1:14.79 TR	(Japan) Nao Kodaira	1:15.25	(Netherlands) Lotte van Beek	1:15.43	
1500 m		(United States) Brittany Bowe	1:55.89	(Netherlands) Lotte van Beek	1:56.13	(Netherlands) Joy Beune	1:57.15	
3000 m		(Czech Republic) Martina Sáblíková	4:02:18	(Russia) Natalia Voronina	4:03.77	(Belarus) Maryna Zuyeva	4:03.80	

== Standings ==
Standings after completion of the event.

=== Men ===
500 m

Rank	Name	Points
1	(Russia) Pavel Kulizhnikov	452
2	(Japan) Tatsuya Shinhama	366
3	(Norway) Håvard Holmefjord Lorentzen	350

1000 m

Rank	Name	Points
1	(Netherlands) Kjeld Nuis	222
2	(Russia) Pavel Kulizhnikov	217
3	(Norway) Håvard Holmefjord Lorentzen	217

1500 m

Rank	Name	Points
1	(Russia) Denis Yuskov	223
2	(Japan) Seitaro Ichinohe	203
3	(South Korea) Min Seok Kim	199

Long distance

Rank	Name	Points
1	(Norway) Sverre Lunde Pedersen	237
2	(Russia) Aleksandr Rumyantsev	236
3	(Netherlands) Marcel Bosker	212

Mass start

Rank	Name	Points
1	(South Korea) Um Cheon-ho	475
2	(Belgium) Bart Swings	430
3	(Russia) Ruslan Zakharov	366

Team pursuit

Rank	Name	Points
1	Norway	312
2	Russia	302
3	Japan	302

Team sprint

Rank	Name	Points
1	Netherlands	336
2	Norway	304
3	Russia	296

=== Women ===
500 m

Rank	Name	Points
1	(Austria) Vanessa Herzog	504
2	(Russia) Olga Fatkulina	403
3	(Russia) Angelina Golikova	388

1000 m

Rank	Name	Points
1	(United States) Brittany Bowe	277
2	(Austria) Vanessa Herzog	217
3	(Japan) Nao Kodaira	202

1500 m

Rank	Name	Points
1	(United States) Brittany Bowe	270
2	(Netherlands) Ireen Wüst	217
3	(Japan) Miho Takagi	211

Long distance

Rank	Name	Points
1	(Czech Republic) Martina Sáblíková	250
2	(Russia) Natalia Voronina	239
3	(Canada) Isabelle Weidemann	236

Mass start

Rank	Name	Points
1	(Italy) Francesca Lollobrigida	328
2	(South Korea) Kim Bo-reum	316
3	(Japan) Nana Takagi	294

Team pursuit

Rank	Name	Points
1	Japan	360
2	Russia	300
3	Canada	290

Team sprint

Rank	Name	Points
1	Russia	314
2	Netherlands	312
3	Japan	308
