= 2018–19 ISU Speed Skating World Cup – World Cup 3 =

The third competition weekend of the 2018–19 ISU Speed Skating World Cup was held at the Arena Lodow Tomaszów Mazowiecki-Lodsch in Tomaszów Mazowiecki, Poland, from Friday, 7 December, until Sunday, 9 December 2018.

== Schedule ==
The detailed event schedule:

Date	Events	Division
Friday, 7 December	500 m women (1); 500 m men (1); 1000 m women 1000 m men	B
Friday, 7 December	500 m women (1); 500 m men (1); 1000 m women 1000 m men Team pursuit women Team pursuit men	A
Saturday, 8 December	500 m women (2); 1500 m women 1500 m men 500 m men (2)	B
Saturday, 8 December	500 m women (1); 1500 m women 1500 m men 500 m men (2)	A
Sunday, 9 December	5000 m women 10000 m men	B
Sunday, 9 December	Team sprint women Team sprint men 5000 m women 10000 m men	A

== Medal summary ==
=== Men's events ===
Event	Race #	Gold	Time	Silver	Time	Bronze	Time	Report
500 m	1	(Russia) Pavel Kulizhnikov	34.83	(Japan) Ryohei Haga	34.98	(Norway) Håvard Holmefjord Lorentzen	35.10	
500 m	2	(Russia) Pavel Kulizhnikov	34.67	(Japan) Tatsuya Shinhama	34.88	(Japan) Yuma Murakami	34.95	
1000 m		(Russia) Pavel Kulizhnikov	1:09.23	(Netherlands) Kai Verbij	1:09.92	(Norway) Håvard Holmefjord Lorentzen	1:10.07	
1500 m		(Russia) Denis Yuskov	1:46.783	(Japan) Seitaro Ichinohe	1:47.381	(South Korea) Kim Min-seok	1:47.851	
10000 m		(Netherlands) Marcel Bosker	13:25.27	(Russia) Aleksandr Rumyantsev	13:26.76	(Russia) Danila Semerikov	13:28.71	
Team pursuit		Japan; Seitaro Ichinohe; Ryosuke Tsuchiya; Shane Williamson	3:47.50	Norway; Håvard Bøkko; Sindre Henriksen; Sverre Lunde Pedersen	3:47.76	Russia; Aleksandr Rumyantsev; Danila Semerikov; Sergey Trofimov	3:47.82	
Team sprint		Norway; Håvard Holmefjord Lorentzen; Henrik Fagerli Rukke; Bjørn Magnussen	1:21.27	Netherlands; Kai Verbij; Dai Dai Ntab; Michel Mulder	1:21.43	Russia; Viktor Mushtakov; Aleksey Yesin; Ruslan Murashov	1:21.74	

=== Women's events ===
Event	Race #	Gold	Time	Silver	Time	Bronze	Time	Report
500 m	1	(Austria) Vanessa Herzog	37.97	(Russia) Olga Fatkulina	38.07	(Russia) Daria Kachanova	38.29	
500 m	2	(Austria) Vanessa Herzog	37.95	(Russia) Olga Fatkulina	38.10	(United States) Brittany Bowe	38.23	
1000 m		(United States) Brittany Bowe	1:15.39	(Japan) Miho Takagi	1:16.42	(Russia) Daria Kachanova	1:16.57	
1500 m		(Japan) Miho Takagi	1:57:32	(Netherlands) Ireen Wüst	1:58:21	(United States) Brittany Bowe	1:58:25	
5000 m		(Netherlands) Esmee Visser	7:05:19	(Canada) Isabelle Weidemann	7:06.19	(Russia) Natalia Voronina	7:08.67	
Team pursuit		Japan; Nana Takagi; Miho Takagi; Ayano Sato	3:02.49	Russia; Elizaveta Kazelina; Evgeniya Lalenkova; Natalya Voronina	3:04.10	Canada; Ivanie Blondin; Keri Morrison; Isabelle Weidemann	3:05.70	
Team sprint		Japan; Miho Takagi; Ayano Sato; Konami Soga	1:27.82	Russia; Yekaterina Shikhova; Olga Fatkulina; Angelina Golikova	1:28.18	Netherlands; Ireen Wüst; Letitia de Jong; Femke Beuling	1:28.53	

== Standings ==
Standings after completion of the event.

=== Men ===
500 m

Rank	Name	Points
1	(Japan) Tatsuya Shinhama	296
2	(Russia) Pavel Kulizhnikov	272
3	(Norway) Håvard Holmefjord Lorentzen	260

1000 m

Rank	Name	Points
1	(Netherlands) Kai Verbij	148
2	(Norway) Håvard Holmefjord Lorentzen	134
3	(Russia) Pavel Kulizhnikov	120

1500 m

Rank	Name	Points
1	(Japan) Seitaro Ichinohe	137
2	(Russia) Denis Yuskov	120
3	(Norway) Sverre Lunde Pedersen	116

5000 and 10.000 m

Rank	Name	Points
1	(Russia) Aleksandr Rumyantsev	144
2	(Netherlands) Marcel Bosker	137
3	(Norway) Sverre Lunde Pedersen	134

Mass start

Rank	Name	Points
1	(South Korea) Um Cheon-ho	475
2	(Belgium) Bart Swings	430
3	(Russia) Ruslan Zakharov	366

Team pursuit

Rank	Name	Points
1	Norway	312
2	Russia	302
3	Japan	302

Team sprint

Rank	Name	Points
1	Netherlands	336
2	Norway	304
3	Russia	296

=== Women ===
500 m

Rank	Name	Points
1	(Austria) Vanessa Herzog	390
2	(Russia) Olga Fatkulina	315
3	(United States) Brittany Bowe	305

1000 m

Rank	Name	Points
1	(United States) Brittany Bowe	157
2	(Japan) Miho Takagi	148
3	(Austria) Vanessa Herzog	146

1500 m

Rank	Name	Points
1	(Netherlands) Ireen Wüst	217
2	(Japan) Miho Takagi	211
3	(United States) Brittany Bowe	210

3000 and 5000 m

Rank	Name	Points
1	(Netherlands) Esmee Visser	149
2	(Canada) Isabelle Weidemann	146
3	(Russia) Natalya Voronina	145

Mass start

Rank	Name	Points
1	(Italy) Francesca Lollobrigida	328
2	(South Korea) Kim Bo-reum	316
3	(Japan) Nana Takagi	294

Team pursuit

Rank	Name	Points
1	Japan	360
2	Russia	300
3	Canada	290

Team sprint

Rank	Name	Points
1	Russia	314
2	Netherlands	312
3	Japan	308
