= 2018–19 ISU Speed Skating World Cup – World Cup 4 =

The fourth competition weekend of the 2018–19 ISU Speed Skating World Cup was held at Thialf in Heerenveen, Netherlands, from Friday, 14 December until Sunday, 16 December 2018.

== Schedule ==
The detailed event schedule:

Date	Events	Division
Friday, 14 December	Mass start semifinal women 1 Mass start semifinal women 2 Mass start semifinal men 1 Mass start semifinal men 2	
Saturday, 15 December
Saturday, 15 December	500 m women 1500 m men 1500 m women 500 m men	B
Saturday, 15 December	500 m women 1500 m men 1500 m women 500 m men	A
Saturday, 15 December	Mass start final men Mass start final women	
Sunday, 16 December	1000 m women 1000 m men 3000 m women 5000 m men	B
Sunday, 16 December	1000 m women 1000 m men 3000 m women 5000 m men	A

== Medal summary ==
=== Men's events ===
Event	Gold	Time	Silver	Time	Bronze	Time	Report
500 m	(Russia) Pavel Kulizhnikov	34.494	(Japan) Tsubasa Hasegawa	34.521	(Japan) Yuma Murakami	34.557	
1000 m	(Netherlands) Kjeld Nuis	1:07.803	(Russia) Pavel Kulizhnikov	1:07.930	(Russia) Denis Yuskov	1:07.953	
1500 m	(Netherlands) Thomas Krol	1:43.782	(United States) Joey Mantia	1:44.092	(Netherlands) Patrick Roest	1:44.128	
5000 m	(Russia) Danila Semerikov	6:08.960 TR	(Netherlands) Patrick Roest	6:09.820	(Netherlands) Sven Kramer	6:10.614	
Mass start	(South Korea) Um Cheon-ho	60 ^{A}	(South Korea) Chung Jae-won	40 ^{A}	(Belgium) Bart Swings	22 ^{A}	

^{A} In mass start, race points are accumulated during the race based on results of the intermediate sprints and the final sprint. The skater with most race points is the winner.

=== Women's events ===
Event	Gold	Time	Silver	Time	Bronze	Time	Report
500 m	(Japan) Nao Kodaira	37.171 TR	(Austria) Vanessa Herzog	37.239	(United States) Brittany Bowe	37.707	
1000 m	(United States) Brittany Bowe	1:13.249 TR	(Japan) Miho Takagi	1:13.939	(Russia) Yekaterina Shikhova	1:14.031	
1500 m	(Netherlands) Ireen Wüst	1:53.300 TR	(United States) Brittany Bowe	1:54.007	(Russia) Yekaterina Shikhova	1:54.039	
3000 m	(Netherlands) Antoinette de Jong	3:59.419	(Canada) Isabelle Weidemann	4:00.129	(Czech Republic) Martina Sáblíková	4:00.337	
Mass start	(Japan) Nana Takagi	60 ^{A}	(Netherlands) Irene Schouten	40 ^{A}	(Japan) Ayano Sato	20 ^{A}	

^{A} In mass start, race points are accumulated during the race based on results of the intermediate sprints and the final sprint. The skater with most race points is the winner.

== Standings ==
Standings after completion of the event.

=== Men ===
500 m

Rank	Name	Points
1	(Japan) Tatsuya Shinhama	339
2	(Russia) Pavel Kulizhnikov	332
3	(Norway) Håvard Holmefjord Lorentzen	292

1000 m

Rank	Name	Points
1	(Norway) Håvard Holmefjord Lorentzen	177
2	(Netherlands) Kjeld Nuis	174
3	(Russia) Pavel Kulizhnikov	174

1500 m

Rank	Name	Points
1	(Japan) Seitaro Ichinohe	167
2	(Russia) Denis Yuskov	163
3	(Netherlands) Kjeld Nuis	154

5000 and 10.000 m

Rank	Name	Points
1	(Russia) Aleksandr Rumyantsev	182
2	(Norway) Sverre Lunde Pedersen	177
3	(Russia) Danila Semerikov	172

Mass start

Rank	Name	Points
1	(South Korea) Um Cheon-ho	475
2	(Belgium) Bart Swings	430
3	(Russia) Ruslan Zakharov	366

Team pursuit

Rank	Name	Points
1	Norway	312
2	Russia	302
3	Japan	302

Team sprint

Rank	Name	Points
1	Netherlands	336
2	Norway	304
3	Russia	296

=== Women ===
500 m

Rank	Name	Points
1	(Austria) Vanessa Herzog	390
2	(Russia) Olga Fatkulina	315
3	(United States) Brittany Bowe	305

1000 m

Rank	Name	Points
1	(United States) Brittany Bowe	217
2	(Japan) Miho Takagi	202
3	(Austria) Vanessa Herzog	177

1500 m

Rank	Name	Points
1	(Netherlands) Ireen Wüst	217
2	(Japan) Miho Takagi	211
3	(United States) Brittany Bowe	210

3000 and 5000 m

Rank	Name	Points
1	(Canada) Isabelle Weidemann	200
2	(Netherlands) Esmee Visser	192
3	(Czech Republic) Martina Sáblíková	190

Mass start

Rank	Name	Points
1	(Italy) Francesca Lollobrigida	328
2	(South Korea) Kim Bo-reum	316
3	(Japan) Nana Takagi	294

Team pursuit

Rank	Name	Points
1	Japan	360
2	Russia	300
3	Canada	290

Team sprint

Rank	Name	Points
1	Russia	314
2	Netherlands	312
3	Japan	308
