= 2019–20 ISU Speed Skating World Cup – World Cup 6 =

The sixth and last competition weekend of the 2019–20 ISU Speed Skating World Cup was held at Thialf in Heerenveen, the Netherlands, from Saturday, 7 March, until Sunday, 8 March 2020.

== Medal summary ==
=== Men's events ===
Event	Gold	Time	Silver	Time	Bronze	Time	Report
500 m (1)	(Japan) Tatsuya Shinhama	34.317	(Canada) Laurent Dubreuil	34.416	(South Korea) Kim Jun-ho	34.418	
500 m (2)	(Japan) Tatsuya Shinhama	34.070 TR	(Canada) Laurent Dubreuil	34.304	(Japan) Yamato Matsui	34.365	
1000 m	(Netherlands) Thomas Krol	1:07.858	(Canada) Laurent Dubreuil	1:08.118	(Netherlands) Kai Verbij	1:08.132	
1500 m	(Netherlands) Kjeld Nuis	1:43.000 TR	(Netherlands) Thomas Krol	1:43.302	(Netherlands) Patrick Roest	1:44.007	
5000 m	(Netherlands) Patrick Roest	6:11.152	(Canada) Graeme Fish	6:12.830	(Canada) Ted-Jan Bloemen	6:13.721	
Mass start^{A}	(South Korea) Chung Jae-won	60	(Belgium) Bart Swings	40	(United States) Joey Mantia	20	

^{A} In mass start, race points are accumulated during the race based on results of the intermediate sprints and the final sprint. The skater with most race points is the winner.

=== Women's events ===
Event	Gold	Time	Silver	Time	Bronze	Time	Report
500 m (1)	(Austria) Vanessa Herzog	37.319	(Russia) Olga Fatkulina	37.340	(Japan) Nao Kodaira	37.392	
500 m (2)	(Russia) Angelina Golikova	37.023 TR	(Japan) Nao Kodaira	37.199	(Austria) Vanessa Herzog	37.252	
1000 m	(Netherlands) Jutta Leerdam	1:13.699	(United States) Brittany Bowe	1:13.981	(Japan) Miho Takagi	1:13.992	
1500 m	(Netherlands) Ireen Wüst	1:53.101 TR	(Japan) Miho Takagi	1:53.274	(Netherlands) Melissa Wijfje	1:54.697	
3000 m	(Canada) Isabelle Weidemann	3:59.759	(Netherlands) Antoinette de Jong	4:00.035	(Russia) Natalya Voronina	4:01.339	
Mass start^{A}	(Netherlands) Melissa Wijfje	66	(Belarus) Maryna Zuyeva	45	(Netherlands) Irene Schouten	20	

^{A} In mass start, race points are accumulated during the race based on results of the intermediate sprints and the final sprint. The skater with most race points is the winner.

=== Mixed event ===
Event	Gold	Time	Silver	Time	Bronze	Time	Report
Mixed Gender Relay	China-1; Qishi Li & Alemasi Kahanbai	2.58.54	Austria; Vanessa Herzog & Gabriel Odor	2.58.99	Canada-1; Ivanie Blondin & Antoine Gélinas-Beaulieu	3.00.21	

Demonstration event. Teams will consist of one male and one female skater, from either the same or different national teams. Teams have to skate six laps in total, with the lady skating the first lap, the man skating the following two laps, the lady skating the fourth and the fifth lap and the man closing it of in the final lap. The relay to the other Skater in the team has to take place with a touch, and changeovers have to be done in the so-called relay zone between cones at the beginning of the finishing straight and before the entry to the corner after the finishing straight. The Team with the best time over 6 laps will be declared the winner. Team with the second-best time will be ranked second and so on.
