= 2019–20 ISU Speed Skating World Cup – World Cup 5 =

Skating competition

The fifth competition weekend of the 2019–20 ISU Speed Skating World Cup was held at the Olympic Oval in Calgary, Canada, from Saturday, 7 February, until Sunday, 8 February 2020.

== Medal summary ==
=== Men's events ===
Event	Gold	Time	Silver	Time	Bronze	Time	Report
500 m	(Russia) Ruslan Murashov	34.043	(Russia) Pavel Kulizhnikov	34.052	(Russia) Viktor Mushtakov	34.068	
1000 m	(Russia) Pavel Kulizhnikov	1:06.497 TR	(Netherlands) Thomas Krol	1:07.017	(Netherlands) Kjeld Nuis	1:07.019	
1500 m	(Russia) Denis Yuskov	1:43.234	(China) Ning Zhongyan	1:43.262	(United States) Joey Mantia	1:43.741	
5000 m	(Netherlands) Patrick Roest	6:07.404	(Canada) Ted-Jan Bloemen	6:07.426	(Canada) Graeme Fish	6:10.583	

=== Women's events ===
Event	Gold	Time	Silver	Time	Bronze	Time	Report
500 m	(Japan) Nao Kodaira	36.658	(Russia) Angelina Golikova	36.780	(Austria) Vanessa Herzog	37.088	
1000 m	(Japan) Nao Kodaira	1:12.652	(Russia) Olga Fatkulina	1:12.806	(Russia) Yekaterina Shikhova	1:12.842	
1500 m	(Japan) Miho Takagi	1:50.337 TR	(Canada) Ivanie Blondin	1:51.767	(Netherlands) Ireen Wüst	1:51.993	
3000 m	(Czech Republic) Martina Sábliková	3:54.936	(Netherlands) Antoinette de Jong	3:56.182	(Russia) Natalya Voronina	3:56.579	
