= 2019–20 ISU Speed Skating World Cup – World Cup 4 =

Skating competition

The fourth competition weekend of the 2019–20 ISU Speed Skating World Cup was held at the M-Wave in Nagano, Japan, from Friday, 13 December, until Sunday, 15 December 2019.

== Medal summary ==
=== Men's events ===
Event	Gold	Time	Silver	Time	Bronze	Time	Report
500 m (1)	(Japan) Yuma Murakami	34.584	(Japan) Tatsuya Shinhama	34.672	(Russia) Pavel Kulizhnikov	34.732	
500 m (2)	(Russia) Viktor Mushtakov	34.508 TR	(Russia) Pavel Kulizhnikov	34.520	(Japan) Yuma Murakami	34.545	
1000 m	(Russia) Pavel Kulizhnikov	1:08.454 TR	(Netherlands) Kai Verbij	1:08.676	(Netherlands) Hein Otterspeer	1:08.956	
5000 m	(Russia) Danila Semerikov	6:18.605	(New Zealand) Peter Michael	6:18.691	(Russia) Alexander Rumyantsev	6:19.663	
Mass start^{A}	(Canada) Jordan Belchos	61	(United States) Joey Mantia	40	(Belgium) Bart Swings	21	
Team pursuit	Russia; Alexander Rumyantsev; Ruslan Zakharov; Danila Semerikov	3:42.939	Japan; Seitaro Ichinohe; Riku Tsuchiya; Shane Williamson	3:42.999	Canada; Tyson Langelaar; Ted-Jan Bloemen; Jordan Belchos	3:44.876	
Team sprint	Russia; Ruslan Murashov; Artem Arefeyev; Pavel Kulizhnikov	1:20.139	Japan; Yuma Murakami; Tatsuya Shinhama; Masaya Yamada	1:20.846	Canada; Alex Boisvert-Lacroix; Antoine Gelinas-Beaulieu; David La Rue	1:20.979	

^{A} In mass start, race points are accumulated during the race based on results of the intermediate sprints and the final sprint. The skater with most race points is the winner.

=== Women's events ===
Event	Gold	Time	Silver	Time	Bronze	Time	Report
500 m (1)	(Japan) Nao Kodaira	37.496	(Russia) Angelina Golikova	37.515	(Austria) Vanessa Herzog	37.653	
500 m (2)	(Russia) Angelina Golikova	37.241	(Austria) Vanessa Herzog	37.455	(Japan) Nao Kodaira	37.505	
1000 m	(United States) Brittany Bowe	1:14.344 TR	(Japan) Miho Takagi	1:14.894	(Netherlands) Sanneke de Neeling	1:14.897	
3000 m	(Canada) Ivanie Blondin	4:00.243 TR	(Czech Republic) Martina Sábliková	4:01.976	(Canada) Isabelle Weidemann	4:03.051	
Mass start^{A}	(Canada) Ivanie Blondin	61	(Japan) Nana Takagi	40	(United States) Mia Kilburg-Manganello	20	
Team pursuit	Japan; Miho Takagi; Nana Takagi; Ayano Sato	2:56.371	Canada; Ivanie Blondin; Valerie Maltais; Isabelle Weidemann	2:57.811	Russia; Elizaveta Kazelina; Natalia Voronina; Evgeniia Lalenkova	3:02.396	
Team sprint	Netherlands; Dione Voskamp; Michelle de Jong; Sanneke de Neeling	1:28.056	Russia; Angelina Golikova; Olga Fatkulina; Daria Kachanova	1:29.113	Japan; Konami Soga; Maki Tsuji; Arisa Go	1:29.261	

^{A} In mass start, race points are accumulated during the race based on results of the intermediate sprints and the final sprint. The skater with most race points is the winner.
