= 2019–20 ISU Speed Skating World Cup – World Cup 3 =

The third competition weekend of the 2019–20 ISU Speed Skating World Cup was held at the Alau Ice Palace in Nur-Sultan, Kazakhstan, from Friday, 6 December, until Sunday, 8 December 2019.

== Medal summary ==
=== Men's events ===
Event	Gold	Time	Silver	Time	Bronze	Time	Report
500 m	(Russia) Viktor Mushtakov	34.636	(Russia) Ruslan Murashov	34.641	(Canada) Alex Boisvert-Lacroix	34.730	
1000 m	(Netherlands) Thomas Krol	1:08.420 TR	(Netherlands) Kjeld Nuis	1:08.535	(Netherlands) Kai Verbij	1:08.818	
1500 m	(China) Ning Zhongyan	1:44.918 TR	(Netherlands) Patrick Roest	1:45.088	(Netherlands) Kjeld Nuis	1:45.214	
10000 m	(Netherlands) Patrick Roest	12:59.442	(Russia) Danila Semerikov	13:02.439	(Canada) Graeme Fish	13:04.255	
Team pursuit	Italy; Andrea Giovannini; Nicola Tumolero; Michele Malfatti	3:46.317	Canada; Ted-Jan Bloemen; Jordan Belchos; Graeme Fish	3:47.661	Russia; Daniil Aldoshkin; Ruslan Zakharov; Danila Semerikov	3:48.260	
Team sprint	Netherlands; Ronald Mulder; Kai Verbij; Thomas Krol	1:19.958	Norway; Bjørn Magnussen; Håvard Holmefjord Lorentzen; Odin By Farstad	1:20.301	Switzerland; Oliver Grob; Christian Oberbichler; Livio Wenger	1:22.167	

=== Women's events ===
Event	Gold	Time	Silver	Time	Bronze	Time	Report
500 m	(Russia) Angelina Golikova	37.585	(Russia) Daria Kachanova	37.601	(Japan) Nao Kodaira	37.727	
1000 m	(United States) Brittany Bowe	1:14.280	(Russia) Daria Kachanova	1:14.753	(Russia) Olga Fatkulina	1:15.093	
1500 m	(Canada) Ivanie Blondin	1:55.599 TR	(Netherlands) Ireen Wüst	1:55.881	(United States) Brittany Bowe	1:55.960	
5000 m	(Canada) Ivanie Blondin	6:54.945 TR	(Czech Republic) Martina Sábliková	6:54.995	(Canada) Isabelle Weidemann	6:55.809	
Team pursuit	Canada; Ivanie Blondin; Valerie Maltais; Isabelle Weidemann	3:00.246	Netherlands; Ireen Wüst; Antoinette de Jong; Melissa Wijfje	3:00.350	Russia; Elizaveta Kazelina; Natalia Voronina; Evgeniia Lalenkova	3:04.346	
Team sprint	Netherlands; Michelle de Jong; Jutta Leerdam; Letitia de Jong	1:27.955	Russia; Angelina Golikova; Irina Kuznetsova; Daria Kachanova	1:29.700	Poland; Andzelika Wójcik; Kaja Ziomek; Karolina Bosiek	1:30.091	
