= 2017–18 ISU Speed Skating World Cup – World Cup 1 =

The first competition weekend of the 2017–18 ISU Speed Skating World Cup was held at Thialf in Heerenveen, Netherlands, from Friday, 10 November until Sunday, 12 November 2017.

== Schedule ==
The detailed event schedule:

| Date | Events | Division |
|---|---|---|
| Friday, 16 November | 500 m women (1); 500 m men (1) | B |
| Friday, 16 November | Mass start men semi-final 1 men Mass start men semi-final 2 men Team pursuit women Team pursuit men | |
| Friday, 16 November | 500 m women (1); 500 m men (1) | A |
| Saturday, 17 November | 500 m women (2); 500 m men (2); 1500 m women 1500 m men | B |
| Saturday, 17 November | 500 m women (1); 1500 m women 1500 m men 500 m men (2) | A |
| Saturday, 17 November | Mass start final women Mass start final men | |
| Sunday, 18 November | 1000 m women 1000 m men 3000 m women 5000 m men | B |
| Sunday, 18 November | 1000 m women 1000 m men 3000 m women 5000 m men | A |
| Sunday, 18 November | Team sprint women Team sprint men | B |

== Medal summary ==
=== Men's events ===
| Event | Gold | Time | Silver | Time | Bronze | Time | Report |
|---|---|---|---|---|---|---|---|
| 500 m | (Norway) Håvard Holmefjord Lorentzen | 34.690 | (Germany) Nico Ihle | 34.780 | (Netherlands) Kai Verbij | 34.840 | |
| 500 m | (Canada) Laurent Dubreuil | 34.800 | (Netherlands) Jan Smeekens | 34.840 | (Netherlands) Ronald Mulder | 34.850 | |
| 1000 m | (Russia) Pavel Kulizhnikov | 1:07.970 | (Netherlands) Kai Verbij | 1:08.120 | (Norway) Håvard Holmefjord Lorentzen | 1:08.280 | |
| 1500 m | (Russia) Denis Yuskov | 1:44.420 | (Canada) Vincent De Haître | 1:45.870 | (Netherlands) Thomas Krol | 1:45.920 | |
| 5000 m | (Netherlands) Sven Kramer | 6:12.880 | (Canada) Ted-Jan Bloemen | 6:14.950 | (Norway) Sverre Lunde Pedersen | 6:15.810 | |
| Mass start | (South Korea) Lee Seung-Hoon | 60 ^{A} | (United States) Joey Mantia | 40 ^{A} | (South Korea) Chung Jae-won | 21 ^{A} | |

^{A} In mass start, race points are accumulated during the race based on results of the intermediate sprints and the final sprint. The skater with most race points is the winner.

=== Women's events ===
| Event | Gold | Time | Silver | Time | Bronze | Time | Report |
|---|---|---|---|---|---|---|---|
| 500 m | (Japan) Nao Kodaira | 37.290 | (South Korea) Lee Sang-Hwa | 37.600 | (Russia) Angelina Golikova | 37.670 | |
| 500 m | (Japan) Nao Kodaira | 37.330 | (South Korea) Lee Sang-Hwa | 37.530 | (Japan) Arisa Go | 37.880 | |
| 1000 m | (Japan) Nao Kodaira | 1:13.990 | (Japan) Miho Takagi | 1:14.450 | (Netherlands) Jorien ter Mors | 1:14.650 | |
| 1500 m | (Japan) Miho Takagi | 1:54.680 | (Netherlands) Jorien ter Mors | 1:55.440 | (Netherlands) Lotte van Beek | 1:56.340 | |
| 3000 m | (Netherlands) Antoinette de Jong | 4:03.530 | (Russia) Natalia Voronina | 4:04.000 | (Canada) Ivanie Blondin | 4:04.160 | |
| Mass start | (Japan) Ayano Sato | 60 ^{A} | (Canada) Ivanie Blondin | 40 ^{A} | (Italy) Francesca Lollobrigida | 23 ^{A} | |

^{A} In mass start, race points are accumulated during the race based on results of the intermediate sprints and the final sprint. The skater with most race points is the winner.
