= 2019 World Sprint Speed Skating Championships – Men =

Men at the 2019 World Sprint Speed Skating Championships
- Venue: Thialf
- Location: Heerenveen, Netherlands
- Dates: 23–24 February
- Competitors: 28 from 15 nations
- Winning points: 137.390

Medalists
gold medal	Pavel Kulizhnikov	Russia
silver medal	Tatsuya Shinhama	Japan
bronze medal	Kjeld Nuis	Netherlands

The Men competition at the 2019 World Sprint Speed Skating Championships was held on 23 and 24 February 2019.

== Results ==
=== 500 m ===
The race was started on 23 February at 15:40.

Rank	Pair	Lane	Name	Country	Time	Diff
1	11	I	Tatsuya Shinhama	Japan	34.66	
2	8	I	Kai Verbij	Netherlands	34.72	+0.06
3	13	O	Pavel Kulizhnikov	Russia	34.74	+0.08
3	11	O	Håvard Holmefjord Lorentzen	Norway	34.74	+0.08
5	14	I	Viktor Mushtakov	Russia	34.75	+0.09
5	13	I	Ruslan Murashov	Russia	34.75	+0.09
7	9	I	Hein Otterspeer	Netherlands	34.92	+0.26
7	12	I	Nico Ihle	Germany	34.92	+0.26
9	10	I	Kjeld Nuis	Netherlands	34.98	+0.32
10	14	O	Laurent Dubreuil	Canada	35.05	+0.39
11	9	O	Artur Nogal	Poland	35.07	+0.41
11	10	O	Masaya Yamada	Japan	35.07	+0.41
13	6	I	Yuto Fujino	Japan	35.11	+0.45
14	8	O	Henrik Fagerli Rukke	Norway	35.12	+0.46
15	5	O	Joel Dufter	Germany	35.20	+0.54
16	7	I	Piotr Michalski	Poland	35.23	+0.57
17	12	O	Christopher Fiola	Canada	35.31	+0.65
18	3	I	Ignat Golovatsiuk	Belarus	35.37	+0.71
19	7	O	David Bosa	Italy	35.49	+0.83
19	4	I	Chung Jae-woong	South Korea	35.49	+0.83
21	3	O	Mathias Vosté	Belgium	35.56	+0.90
22	2	I	Noh Joon-soo	South Korea	35.73	+1.07
23	5	I	Marten Liiv	Estonia	35.78	+1.12
24	2	O	Alexander Klenko	Kazakhstan	35.90	+1.24
25	1	O	Samuli Suomalainen	Finland	35.93	+1.27
26	4	O	Joey Mantia	United States	36.06	+1.40
26	1	I	Jeremias Marx	Germany	36.06	+1.40
28	6	O	Kim Young-jin	South Korea	36.21	+1.55

=== 1000 m ===
The race was started on 23 February at 17:07.

Rank	Pair	Lane	Name	Country	Time	Diff
1	13	I	Kjeld Nuis	Netherlands	1:07.86	
2	7	I	Masaya Yamada	Japan	1:08.03	+0.17
3	14	I	Pavel Kulizhnikov	Russia	1:08.06	+0.20
4	11	I	Håvard Holmefjord Lorentzen	Norway	1:08.19	+0.33
5	10	I	Tatsuya Shinhama	Japan	1:08.57	+0.71
6	11	O	Hein Otterspeer	Netherlands	1:08.67	+0.81
7	8	I	Joel Dufter	Germany	1:08.79	+0.93
7	8	O	Nico Ihle	Germany	1:08.79	+0.93
9	12	O	Viktor Mushtakov	Russia	1:08.93	+1.07
10	14	O	Kai Verbij	Netherlands	1:09.21	+1.35
11	9	O	Yuto Fujino	Japan	1:09.43	+1.57
12	10	O	Ignat Golovatsiuk	Belarus	1:09.55	+1.69
13	13	O	Laurent Dubreuil	Canada	1:09.75	+1.89
14	1	I	Ruslan Murashov	Russia	1:10.07	+2.21
14	5	I	Chung Jae-woong	South Korea	1:10.07	+2.21
16	12	I	Joey Mantia	United States	1:10.15	+2.29
17	5	O	Henrik Fagerli Rukke	Norway	1:10.24	+2.38
18	6	I	Artur Nogal	Poland	1:10.38	+2.52
19	9	I	Mathias Vosté	Belgium	1:10.46	+2.60
20	7	O	Christopher Fiola	Canada	1:10.47	+2.61
21	6	O	Piotr Michalski	Poland	1:10.55	+2.69
22	4	I	Marten Liiv	Estonia	1:10.65	+2.79
23	1	O	Noh Joon-soo	South Korea	1:11.08	+3.22
24	2	I	Alexander Klenko	Kazakhstan	1:11.20	+3.34
25	3	O	Kim Young-jin	South Korea	1:11.23	+3.37
26	2	O	Samuli Suomalainen	Finland	1:11.26	+3.40
27	4	O	Jeremias Marx	Germany	1:11.28	+3.43
28	3	I	David Bosa	Italy	1:11.41	+3.55

=== 500 m ===
The race was started on 24 February at 15:40.

Rank	Pair	Lane	Name	Country	Time	Diff
1	14	I	Pavel Kulizhnikov	Russia	34.31	
2	13	O	Tatsuya Shinhama	Japan	34.45	+0.14
3	9	O	Kai Verbij	Netherlands	34.74	+0.43
4	8	O	Ruslan Murashov	Russia	34.77	+0.46
5	8	I	Artur Nogal	Poland	34.78	+0.47
6	13	I	Håvard Holmefjord Lorentzen	Norway	34.91	+0.60
7	12	O	Viktor Mushtakov	Russia	35.05	+0.74
7	10	I	Laurent Dubreuil	Canada	35.05	+0.74
7	14	O	Kjeld Nuis	Netherlands	35.05	+0.74
10	10	O	Nico Ihle	Germany	35.14	+0.83
10	11	O	Hein Otterspeer	Netherlands	35.14	+0.83
12	12	I	Masaya Yamada	Japan	35.17	+0.86
13	6	O	Ignat Golovatsiuk	Belarus	35.29	+0.98
13	5	O	Piotr Michalski	Poland	35.29	+0.98
15	11	I	Joel Dufter	Germany	35.41	+1.10
16	7	O	Yuto Fujino	Japan	35.44	+1.13
17	7	I	Christopher Fiola	Canada	35.56	+1.25
18	3	O	Marten Liiv	Estonia	35.63	+1.32
19	4	I	David Bosa	Italy	35.65	+1.34
20	4	O	Chung Jae-woong	South Korea	35.71	+1.40
21	1	I	Kim Young-jin	South Korea	35.75 7	+1.44
22	6	I	Mathias Vosté	Belgium	35.77	+1.46
23	2	O	Noh Joon-soo	South Korea	35.80	+1.49
24	2	I	Samuli Suomalainen	Finland	35.94	+1.63
25	3	I	Alexander Klenko	Kazakhstan	35.99	+1.68
26	1	O	Jeremias Marx	Germany	36.41	+2.10
—	9	I	Henrik Fagerli Rukke	Norway	Disqualified	
—	5	I	Joey Mantia	United States	Did not start	

=== 1000 m ===
The race was started on 24 February at 17:07.

Rank	Pair	Lane	Name	Country	Time	Diff
1	10	O	Kjeld Nuis	Netherlands	1:07.80	
2	13	O	Pavel Kulizhnikov	Russia	1:08.62	+0.82
3	11	O	Håvard Holmefjord Lorentzen	Norway	1:08.73	+0.92
4	10	I	Nico Ihle	Germany	1:08.76	+0.96
5	12	O	Tatsuya Shinhama	Japan	1:08.82	+1.02
6	13	I	Kai Verbij	Netherlands	1:08.85	+1.05
7	9	O	Masaya Yamada	Japan	1:09.00	+1.20
8	11	I	Hein Otterspeer	Netherlands	1:09.05	+1.25
9	7	O	Joel Dufter	Germany	1:09.26	+1.46
10	12	I	Viktor Mushtakov	Russia	1:09.38	+1.58
11	8	O	Ruslan Murashov	Russia	1:09.69	+1.89
12	9	I	Laurent Dubreuil	Canada	1:09.83	+2.03
13	7	I	Ignat Golovatsiuk	Belarus	1:09.86	+2.06
14	4	O	Mathias Vosté	Belgium	1:10.06	+2.26
15	6	O	Artur Nogal	Poland	1:10.11	+2.31
16	6	I	Piotr Michalski	Poland	1:10.62	+2.82
17	3	O	Marten Liiv	Estonia	1:10.63	+2.83
18	8	I	Yuto Fujino	Japan	1:10.85	+3.05
19	5	O	Chung Jae-woong	South Korea	1:11.03	+3.23
20	3	I	Samuli Suomalainen	Finland	1:11.30	+3.50
21	5	I	Christopher Fiola	Canada	1:11.38	+3.58
22	4	I	Noh Joon-soo	South Korea	1:11.52	+3.72
23	1	O	Alexander Klenko	Kazakhstan	1:11.54	+3.74
24	2	I	Kim Young-jin	South Korea	1:11.58	+3.78
25	2	O	David Bosa	Italy	1:11.65	+3.85
26	1	I	Jeremias Marx	Germany	1:11.87	+4.07

=== Overall standings ===
After all races.

Rank	Name	Country	Points	Diff
1st place, gold medalist(s)	Pavel Kulizhnikov	Russia	137.390	
2nd place, silver medalist(s)	Tatsuya Shinhama	Japan	137.805	+0.83
3rd place, bronze medalist(s)	Kjeld Nuis	Netherlands	137.860	+0.94
4	Håvard Holmefjord Lorentzen	Norway	138.110	+1.44
5	Kai Verbij	Netherlands	138.490	+2.20
6	Masaya Yamada	Japan	138.755	+2.73
7	Nico Ihle	Germany	138.835	+2.89
8	Hein Otterspeer	Netherlands	138.920	+3.06
9	Viktor Mushtakov	Russia	138.955	+3.13
10	Ruslan Murashov	Russia	139.400	+4.02
11	Joel Dufter	Germany	139.635	+4.49
12	Laurent Dubreuil	Canada	139.890	+5.00
13	Artur Nogal	Poland	140.095	+5.41
14	Ignat Golovatsiuk	Belarus	140.365	+5.95
15	Yuto Fujino	Japan	140.690	+6.60
16	Piotr Michalski	Poland	141.105	+7.43
17	Mathias Vosté	Belgium	141.590	+8.40
18	Chung Jae-woong	South Korea	141.750	+8.72
19	Christopher Fiola	Canada	141.795	+8.81
20	Marten Liiv	Estonia	142.050	+9.32
21	David Bosa	Italy	142.670	+10.56
22	Noh Joon-soo	South Korea	142.830	+10.88
23	Alexander Klenko	Kazakhstan	143.150	+11.52
24	Samuli Suomalainen	Finland	143.260	+11.74
25	Kim Young-jin	South Korea	143.365	+11.95
26	Jeremias Marx	Germany	144.050	+13.32
—	Henrik Fagerli Rukke	Norway	Did not finish	
—	Joey Mantia	United States	Did not finish	
