= 2019 World Single Distances Speed Skating Championships – Women's 5000 metres =

Women's 5000 metres at the 2019 World Single Distances Speed Skating Championships
- Venue: Max Aicher Arena
- Location: Inzell, Germany
- Dates: 9 February
- Competitors: 12 from 8 nations
- Winning time: 6:44.85

Medalists
| gold medal | Martina Sáblíková | Czech Republic |
| silver medal | Esmee Visser | Netherlands |
| bronze medal | Natalya Voronina | Russia |

The Women's 5000 metres competition at the 2019 World Single Distances Speed Skating Championships was held on 9 February 2019.

== Results ==
The race was started at 13:15.

| Rank | Pair | Lane | Name | Country | Time | Diff |
|---|---|---|---|---|---|---|
| 1st place, gold medalist(s) | 6 | i | Martina Sáblíková | Czech Republic | 6:44.85 | |
| 2nd place, silver medalist(s) | 4 | o | Esmee Visser | Netherlands | 6:46.14 | +1.29 |
| 3rd place, bronze medalist(s) | 5 | o | Natalya Voronina | Russia | 6:50.39 | +5.54 |
| 4 | 4 | i | Isabelle Weidemann | Canada | 6:56.13 | +11.28 |
| 5 | 2 | i | Carien Kleibeuker | Netherlands | 6:56.47 | +11.62 |
| 6 | 6 | o | Ivanie Blondin | Canada | 6:56.73 | +11.88 |
| 7 | 3 | o | Claudia Pechstein | Germany | 7:00.90 | +16.05 |
| 8 | 1 | o | Elena Sokhryakova | Russia | 7:04.60 | +19.75 |
| 9 | 5 | i | Maryna Zuyeva | Belarus | 7:04.71 | +19.86 |
| 10 | 3 | i | Nene Sakai | Japan | 7:08.59 | +23.74 |
| 11 | 2 | o | Lemi Williamson | Japan | 7:18.33 | +33.48 |
| 12 | 1 | i | Magdalena Czyszczoń | Poland | 7:18.61 | +33.76 |
