= 2019–20 ISU Speed Skating World Cup – World Cup 1 =

Skating competition

The first competition weekend of the 2019–20 ISU Speed Skating World Cup was held at the Minsk Arena in Minsk, Belarus, from Friday, 15 November, until Sunday 17 November 2019.

== Medal summary ==
=== Men's events ===
Event	Gold	Time	Silver	Time	Bronze	Time	Report
500 m	(South Korea) Kim Jun-ho	34.870	(China) Gao Tingyu	34.913	(Netherlands) Dai Dai Ntab	34.916	
1000 m	(Netherlands) Thomas Krol	1:09.001 TR	(China) Ning Zhongyan	1:09.220	(Netherlands) Kjeld Nuis	1:09.275	
1500 m	(Netherlands) Kjeld Nuis	1:46.223	(Russia) Denis Yuskov	1:46.456	(Netherlands) Thomas Krol	1:46.498	
5000 m	(Netherlands) Patrick Roest	6:16.615 TR	(Netherlands) Jorrit Bergsma	6:22.297	(Russia) Denis Yuskov	6:22.543	
Mass start^{A}	(Netherlands) Jorrit Bergsma	62	(South Korea) Chung Jae-won	40	(South Korea) Um Cheon-ho	20	
Team sprint	Netherlands; Ronald Mulder; Kjeld Nuis; Kai Verbij	1:21.163	China; Wang Shiwei; Lian Ziwen; Ning Zhongyan	1:21.322	Canada; Gilmore Junio; Laurent Dubreuil; David La Rue	1:21.680	

^{A} In mass start, race points are accumulated during the race based on results of the intermediate sprints and the final sprint. The skater with most race points is the winner.

=== Women's events ===
Event	Gold	Time	Silver	Time	Bronze	Time	Report
500 m	(Russia) Olga Fatkulina	37.920 TR	(Russia) Daria Kachanova	37.944	(Japan) Nao Kodaira	38.172	
1000 m	(United States) Brittany Bowe	1:15.354 TR	(Netherlands) Jorien ter Mors	1:15.950	(Russia) Yekaterina Shikhova	1:15.962	
1500 m	(Netherlands) Ireen Wüst	1:56.468	(Russia) Yekaterina Shikhova	1:56.864	(United States) Brittany Bowe	1:57.253	
3000 m	(Canada) Isabelle Weidemann	4:04.679	(Netherlands) Carlijn Achtereekte	4:05.153	(Canada) Ivanie Blondin	4:06.080	
Mass start^{A}	(Canada) Ivanie Blondin	60	(Netherlands) Irene Schouten	40	(Italy) Francesca Lollobrigida	20	
Team sprint	Netherlands; Michelle de Jong; Jutta Leerdam; Letitia de Jong	1:29.230	Russia; Irina Kuznetsova; Angelina Golikova; Olga Fatkulina	1:29.950	Japan; Konami Soga; Arisa Go; Maki Tsuji	1:30.086	

^{A} In mass start, race points are accumulated during the race based on results of the intermediate sprints and the final sprint. The skater with most race points is the winner.
