= 2023 World Single Distances Speed Skating Championships – Men's 1000 metres =

Men's 1000 metres at the 2023 World Single Distances Speed Skating Championships
- Venue: Thialf
- Location: Heerenveen, Netherlands
- Date: 4 March
- Competitors: 24 from 13 nations

Medalists
gold medal	Jordan Stolz	United States
silver medal	Thomas Krol	Netherlands
bronze medal	Cornelius Kersten	Great Britain

The Men's 1000 metres competition at the 2023 World Single Distances Speed Skating Championships was held on 4 March 2023.

== Results ==
The race was started at 15:14.

Rank	Pair	Lane	Name	Country	Time	Diff
1st place, gold medalist(s)	12	o	Jordan Stolz	United States	1:07.11	
2nd place, silver medalist(s)	10	o	Thomas Krol	Netherlands	1:07.78	+0.67
3rd place, bronze medalist(s)	4	i	Cornelius Kersten	Great Britain	1:08.02	+0.91
4	6	o	Kjeld Nuis	Netherlands	1:08.10	+0.99
5	7	o	Håvard Holmefjord Lorentzen	Norway	1:08.26	+1.15
6	12	i	Hein Otterspeer	Netherlands	1:08.31	+1.20
7	9	i	Antoine Gélinas-Beaulieu	Canada	1:08.73	+1.62
8	6	i	Mathias Vosté	Belgium	1:08.75	+1.64
9	8	i	Marten Liiv	Estonia	1:08.82	+1.71
10	5	i	Cooper McLeod	United States	1:08.82	+1.71
11	11	i	Laurent Dubreuil	Canada	1:08.90	+1.79
12	2	i	Tatsuya Shinhama	Japan	1:08.92	+1.81
13	9	o	Damian Żurek	Poland	1:09.09	+1.98
14	7	i	David Bosa	Italy	1:09.10	+1.99
15	4	o	Ning Zhongyan	China	1:09.15	+2.04
16	10	i	Ryota Kojima	Japan	1:09.21	+2.10
17	5	o	Piotr Michalski	Poland	1:09.32	+2.21
18	8	o	Moritz Klein	Germany	1:09.45	+2.34
19	2	o	Hendrik Dombek	Germany	1:09.60	+2.49
20	11	o	Kazuya Yamada	Japan	1:09.79	+2.68
21	1	o	Nil Llop	Spain	1:10.00	+2.89
22	3	o	Lian Ziwen	China	1:10.19	+3.08
23	3	i	Vincent De Haître	Canada	1:10.29	+3.18
24	1	i	Liu Bin	China	1:10.89	+3.78
