= List of Mongolian records in speed skating =

The following are the national records in speed skating in Mongolia maintained by the Skating Union of Mongolia.

== Men ==
Event	Record	Athlete	Date	Meet	Place	Ref
500 meters	36.33	Yalalt Zorigtbaatar	3 December 2017	World Cup	Calgary, Canada	
500 meters × 2						
1000 meters	1:11.17	Yalalt Zorigtbaatar	18 March 2017	Olympic Oval Final	Calgary, Canada	
1500 meters	1:50.89	Galbaatar Uuganbaatar	6 March 2013	Olympic Oval Final	Calgary, Canada	
3000 meters	4:01.58	Galbaatar Uuganbaatar	2 November 2013	Time Trials	Calgary, Canada	
5000 meters	6:40.92	Galbaatar Uuganbaatar	18 March 2009	Olympic Oval Final	Calgary, Canada	
10000 meters	14:48.50	Galbaatar Uuganbaatar	25 February 2009	Universiade	Harbin, China	
Team pursuit (8 laps)						
Sprint combination	150.800 pts	Galbaatar Uuganbaatar	21–22 March 2009	Olympic Oval Final	Calgary, Canada	
Small combination	159.744 pts	Ganbat Munkh-Amidral	18–19 March 2009	Olympic Oval Final	Calgary, Canada	
Big combination	175.977 pts	Radnaagin Khurelbator	March 1987		Almaty, Soviet Union	

== Women ==
Event	Record	Athlete	Date	Meet	Place	Ref
500 meters	40.70	Altan-Ochiryn Zul	19 November 2017	CanAm International	Calgary, Canada	
500 meters × 2	85.48 points	Altan-Ochiryn Zul	2 February 2017	Winter Universiade	Almaty, Kazakhstan	
1000 meters	1:21.22	Buyantogtokhyn Sumiyaa	16 March 2017	Olympic Oval Final	Calgary, Canada	
1500 meters	2:04.30	Altan-Ochiryn Zul	22 October 2021	AmCup #1	Salt Lake City, United States	
3000 meters	4:25.69	Dalanbayar Delgermaa	2 November 2013	Time Trials	Calgary, Canada	
5000 meters	8:08.68	Altan-Ochiryn Zul	20 November 2021	International Time Trial	Salt Lake City, United States	
10000 meters						
Team pursuit (6 laps)						
Sprint combination	174.080 pts	Dalanbayar Delgermaa	8–9 February 2014	Mongolian Sprint Championships	Ulaanbaatar, Mongolia	
Mini combination	185.541 pts	Dalanbayar Delgermaa	24–25 February 2013		Ulaanbaatar, Mongolia	
Small combination						
