= 2020 European Speed Skating Championships – Women's 3000 metres =

Women's 3000 metres at the 2020 European Speed Skating Championships
- Venue: Thialf
- Location: Heerenveen, Netherlands
- Dates: 11 January
- Competitors: 16 from 8 nations
- Winning time: 3:59.15

Medalists
gold medal	Esmee Visser	Netherlands
silver medal	Natalya Voronina	Russia
bronze medal	Francesca Lollobrigida	Italy

The women's 3000 metres competition at the 2020 European Speed Skating Championships was held on 11 January 2020.

== Results ==
The race was started at 14:59.

Rank	Pair	Lane	Name	Country	Time	Diff
1st place, gold medalist(s)	3	i	Esmee Visser	Netherlands	3:59.15	
2nd place, silver medalist(s)	7	i	Natalya Voronina	Russia	4:01.660	+2.51
3rd place, bronze medalist(s)	4	o	Francesca Lollobrigida	Italy	4:01.663	+2.51
4	8	i	Martina Sáblíková	Czech Republic	4:01.96	+2.81
5	4	i	Carlijn Achtereekte	Netherlands	4:02.19	+3.04
6	8	o	Maryna Zuyeva	Belarus	4:04.482	+5.33
7	1	i	Irene Schouten	Netherlands	4:04.484	+5.33
8	7	o	Evgeniia Lalenkova	Russia	4:04.78	+5.63
9	3	o	Noemi Bonazza	Italy	4:04.92	+5.77
10	6	o	Nikola Zdráhalová	Czech Republic	4:06.94	+7.79
11	5	o	Sofie Karoline Haugen	Norway	4:07.06	+7.91
12	6	i	Claudia Pechstein	Germany	4:07.30	+8.15
13	1	o	Elena Sokhryakova	Russia	4:07.43	+8.28
14	5	i	Roxanne Dufter	Germany	4:11.70	+12.55
15	2	o	Michelle Uhrig	Germany	4:14.28	+15.13
16	2	i	Magdalena Czyszczoń	Poland	4:15.63	+16.48
