= 2018 European Speed Skating Championships – Women's 3000 metres =

Women's 3000 metres at the 2018 European Speed Skating Championships
- Venue: Kolomna Speed Skating Center
- Location: Kolomna, Russia
- Dates: 6 January
- Competitors: 18 from 8 nations
- Winning time: 4:05.31

Medalists
gold medal	Esmee Visser	Netherlands
silver medal	Carlijn Achtereekte	Netherlands
bronze medal	Natalia Voronina	Russia

The women's 3000 metres competition at the 2018 European Speed Skating Championships was held on 6 January 2018.

== Results ==
The race was started at 16:16.

Rank	Pair	Lane	Name	Country	Time	Diff
1st place, gold medalist(s)	3	i	Esmee Visser	Netherlands	4:05.31	
2nd place, silver medalist(s)	9	o	Carlijn Achtereekte	Netherlands	4:06.81	+1.50
3rd place, bronze medalist(s)	9	i	Natalia Voronina	Russia	4:07.62	+2.31
4	7	i	Francesca Lollobrigida	Italy	4:08.77	+3.46
5	8	o	Anna Yurakova	Russia	4:09.33	+4.02
6	4	o	Olga Graf	Russia	4:11.28	+5.97
7	3	o	Camilla Lund	Norway	4:11.89	+6.58
8	8	i	Annouk van der Weijden	Netherlands	4:12.48	+7.17
9	5	o	Roxanne Dufter	Germany	4:13.24	+7.93
10	6	i	Nikola Zdráhalová	Czech Republic	4:13.71	+8.40
11	2	o	Sofie Karoline Haugen	Norway	4:14.25	+8.94
12	6	o	Saskia Alusalu	Estonia	4:14.61	+9.30
13	4	i	Katarzyna Bachleda-Curuś	Poland	4:14.84	+9.53
14	5	i	Luiza Zlotkowska	Poland	4:14.91	+9.60
15	7	o	Karolina Bosiek	Poland	4:15.59	+10.28
16	2	i	Natálie Kerschbaummayr	Czech Republic	4:19.90	+14.59
17	1	o	Gloria Malfatti	Italy	4:28.33	+23.02
18	1	i	Eliška Dřímalová	Czech Republic	4:30.20	+24.89
