= 2020 World Single Distances Speed Skating Championships – Women's 5000 metres =

Women's 5000 metres at the 2020 World Single Distances Speed Skating Championships
- Venue: Utah Olympic Oval
- Location: Salt Lake City, United States
- Dates: February 15
- Competitors: 12 from 9 nations
- Winning time: 6:39.02

Medalists
gold medal	Natalya Voronina	Russia
silver medal	Martina Sáblíková	Czech Republic
bronze medal	Esmee Visser	Netherlands

The Women's 5000 metres competition at the 2020 World Single Distances Speed Skating Championships was held on February 15, 2020.

== Results ==
The race was started at 12:30.

Rank	Pair	Lane	Name	Country	Time	Diff
1st place, gold medalist(s)	6	o	Natalya Voronina	Russia	6:39.02 WR	
2nd place, silver medalist(s)	4	i	Martina Sáblíková	Czech Republic	6:41.18	+2.16
3rd place, bronze medalist(s)	4	o	Esmee Visser	Netherlands	6:46.68	+7.66
4	6	i	Maryna Zuyeva	Belarus	6:48.22	+9.20
5	5	i	Ivanie Blondin	Canada	6:48.98	+9.96
6	5	o	Isabelle Weidemann	Canada	6:49.10	+10.08
7	2	o	Irene Schouten	Netherlands	6:50.59	+11.57
8	1	o	Claudia Pechstein	Germany	6:55.01	+15.99
9	1	i	Sofie Karoline Haugen	Norway	6:56.64	+17.62
10	3	i	Elena Sokhryakova	Russia	6:59.58	+20.56
11	2	i	Nene Sakai	Japan	7:04.32	+25.29
12	3	o	Nadezhda Morozova	Kazakhstan	7:07.19	+28.17
