= 2020 World Single Distances Speed Skating Championships – Women's 3000 metres =

Women's 3000 metres at the 2020 World Single Distances Speed Skating Championships
- Venue: Utah Olympic Oval
- Location: Salt Lake City, United States
- Dates: February 13
- Competitors: 20 from 10 nations
- Winning time: 3:54.25

Medalists
gold medal	Martina Sáblíková	Czech Republic
silver medal	Carlijn Achtereekte	Netherlands
bronze medal	Natalya Voronina	Russia

The Women's 3000 metres competition at the 2020 World Single Distances Speed Skating Championships was held on February 13, 2020.

== Results ==
The race was started at 12:30.

Rank	Pair	Lane	Name	Country	Time	Diff
1st place, gold medalist(s)	9	o	Martina Sáblíková	Czech Republic	3:54.25	
2nd place, silver medalist(s)	6	o	Carlijn Achtereekte	Netherlands	3:54.92	+0.67
3rd place, bronze medalist(s)	8	i	Natalya Voronina	Russia	3:55.54	+1.29
4	8	o	Evgeniia Lalenkova	Russia	3:55.81	+1.56
5	7	i	Esmee Visser	Netherlands	3:56.76	+2.53
6	9	i	Ivanie Blondin	Canada	3:57.56	+3.31
7	1	o	Irene Schouten	Netherlands	3:58.26	+4.01
8	7	o	Francesca Lollobrigida	Italy	3:58.71	+4.46
9	10	o	Maryna Zuyeva	Belarus	3:59.41	+5.16
10	10	i	Isabelle Weidemann	Canada	4:01.34	+7.09
11	5	o	Claudia Pechstein	Germany	4:01.91	+7.66
12	5	i	Valérie Maltais	Canada	4:02.13	+7.88
13	4	o	Nana Takagi	Japan	4:03.36	+9.11
14	6	i	Nikola Zdráhalová	Czech Republic	4:03.48	+9.23
15	2	o	Roxanne Dufter	Germany	4:03.71	+9.46
16	3	o	Mia Kilburg	United States	4:05.83	+11.58
17	4	i	Natalia Czerwonka	Poland	4:06.24	+11.99
18	3	i	Nene Sakai	Japan	4:07.23	+12.98
19	2	i	Noemi Bonazza	Italy	4:08.22	+13.97
–	1	i	Elena Sokhryakova	Russia	Disqualified	
