= 2023 World Single Distances Speed Skating Championships – Men's 1500 metres =

Men's 1500 metres at the 2023 World Single Distances Speed Skating Championships
- Venue: Thialf
- Location: Heerenveen, Netherlands
- Date: 5 March
- Competitors: 24 from 12 nations
- Winning time: 1:43.59

Medalists
| gold medal | Jordan Stolz | United States |
| silver medal | Kjeld Nuis | Netherlands |
| bronze medal | Thomas Krol | Netherlands |

The Men's 1500 metres competition at the 2023 World Single Distances Speed Skating Championships was held on 5 March 2023.

== Results ==
The race was started at 12:45.

| Rank | Pair | Lane | Name | Country | Time | Diff |
|---|---|---|---|---|---|---|
| 1st place, gold medalist(s) | 11 | i | Jordan Stolz | United States | 1:43.59 | |
| 2nd place, silver medalist(s) | 12 | o | Kjeld Nuis | Netherlands | 1:43.82 | +0.23 |
| 3rd place, bronze medalist(s) | 8 | o | Thomas Krol | Netherlands | 1:44.30 | +0.71 |
| 4 | 10 | i | Wesly Dijs | Netherlands | 1:44.59 | +1.00 |
| 5 | 10 | o | Sander Eitrem | Norway | 1:44.64 | +1.05 |
| 6 | 9 | o | Bart Swings | Belgium | 1:44.93 | +1.34 |
| 7 | 7 | i | Antoine Gélinas-Beaulieu | Canada | 1:45.24 | +1.65 |
| 8 | 5 | o | Allan Dahl Johansson | Norway | 1:45.40 | +1.81 |
| 9 | 8 | i | Ning Zhongyan | China | 1:45.50 | +1.91 |
| 10 | 12 | i | Connor Howe | Canada | 1:45.52 | +1.93 |
| 11 | 7 | o | Taiyo Nonomura | Japan | 1:45.55 | +1.96 |
| 12 | 5 | i | Alessio Trentini | Italy | 1:46.04 | +2.45 |
| 13 | 6 | o | Tyson Langelaar | Canada | 1:46.06 | +2.47 |
| 14 | 11 | o | Kazuya Yamada | Japan | 1:46.20 | +2.61 |
| 15 | 6 | i | Masaya Yamada | Japan | 1:46.54 | +2.95 |
| 16 | 1 | o | Casey Dawson | United States | 1:46.75 | +3.16 |
| 17 | 4 | o | Dmitry Morozov | Kazakhstan | 1:46.76 | +3.17 |
| 18 | 4 | i | Gabriel Odor | Austria | 1:46.89 | +3.30 |
| 19 | 1 | i | Emery Lehman | United States | 1:46.93 | +3.34 |
| 20 | 3 | o | Stefan Emele | Germany | 1:47.04 | +3.45 |
| 21 | 3 | i | Um Cheon-ho | South Korea | 1:47.10 | +3.51 |
| 22 | 2 | o | Francesco Betti | Italy | 1:47.98 | +4.39 |
| 23 | 2 | i | Shen Hanyang | China | 1:50.68 | +7.09 |
| — | 9 | i | Peder Kongshaug | Norway | Did not finish | |
