= 2018 European Speed Skating Championships – Men's 1500 metres =

Men's 1500 metres at the 2018 European Speed Skating Championships
- Venue: Kolomna Speed Skating Center
- Location: Kolomna, Russia
- Dates: 5 January
- Competitors: 22 from 12 nations
- Winning time: 1:44.53

Medalists
gold medal	Denis Yuskov	Russia
silver medal	Thomas Krol	Netherlands
bronze medal	Koen Verweij	Netherlands

The men's 1500 metres competition at the 2018 European Speed Skating Championships was held on 5 January 2018.

== Results ==
The race was started at 18:24.

Rank	Pair	Lane	Name	Country	Time	Diff
1st place, gold medalist(s)	9	i	Denis Yuskov	Russia	1:44.53	
2nd place, silver medalist(s)	9	o	Thomas Krol	Netherlands	1:45.20	+0.67
3rd place, bronze medalist(s)	11	i	Koen Verweij	Netherlands	1:46.40	+1.87
4	8	o	Marcel Bosker	Netherlands	1:46.50	+1.97
5	10	o	Sergey Gryaztsov	Russia	1:46.72	+2.19
6	6	o	Nicola Tumolero	Italy	1:47.59	+3.06
7	11	o	Haralds Silovs	Latvia	1:47.60	+3.07
8	10	i	Konrad Niedźwiedzki	Poland	1:47.98	+3.45
9	6	i	Jan Szymański	Poland	1:48.07	+3.54
10	8	i	Zbigniew Bródka	Poland	1:48.44	+3.91
11	1	i	Danil Sinitsyn	Russia	1:49.42	+4.89
12	5	o	Joel Dufter	Germany	1:49.52	+4.99
13.	7	o	Mathias Vosté	Belgium	1:50.24	+5.71
14	2	i	Magnus Bakken Haugli	Norway	1:50.33	+5.80
15	3	i	Runar Njåtun Krøyer	Norway	1:50.51	+5.98
16	3	o	Vitaly Mikhailov	Belarus	1:50.57	+6.04
17	7	i	David Andersson	Sweden	1:51.02	+6.49
18	4	o	Michele Malfatti	Italy	1:51.53	+7.00
19	5	i	Samuli Suomalainen	Finland	1:51.67	+7.14
20	4	i	Riccardo Bugari	Italy	1:51.75	+7.22
21	2	o	Hallgeir Engebråten	Norway	1:53.41	+8.88
22	1	o	Oliver Grob	Switzerland	1:55.15	+10.62
