= Speed skating at the 2018 Winter Olympics – Women's 5000 metres =

Women's 5000 metres at the XXIII Olympic Winter Games
- Venue: Gangneung Oval
- Date: 16 February 2018
- Competitors: 12 from 9 nations
- Winning time: 6:50.23

Medalists
1st place, gold medalist(s)		Esmee Visser	Netherlands
2nd place, silver medalist(s)		Martina Sáblíková	Czech Republic
3rd place, bronze medalist(s)		Natalya Voronina	Olympic Athletes from Russia

The women's 5000 metres speed skating competition of the 2018 Winter Olympics was held at Gangneung Oval in Gangneung on 16 February 2018. The event was won by Esmee Visser, skating her first Olympic race. The defending champion Martina Sáblíková finished second. Natalya Voronina was third, also earning her first Olympic medal.

== Summary ==
Skating in the first pair, Annouk van der Weijden raced to a time of 6:54.17, shaving two seconds off her personal best and taking the lead. She retained it until the fourth pair, where Esmee Visser, in a consistent race lapping in the low 32 seconds, posted a time of 6:50.23. This, too, was a personal best - over 6 seconds faster than her second-place time at the 2018 Dutch Olympic qualifying tournament, and a marked improvement over her season-start PB of 7:14.xx. In the last pair, Martina Sáblíková, recently recovered from a protracted back injury that hamstrung her preparations for the Olympics, skated to a silver medal time of 6:51.85; direct competitor Natalya Voronina took the bronze medal position, surpassing van der Weijden's time by 0.19s and nudging her off the podium into fourth place. Five-time Olympic gold medalist and the Olympic record holder at this distance Claudia Pechstein — now 45 years of age — came home in eighth place.

In the victory ceremony, the medals were presented by Sam Ramsamy, member of the International Olympic Committee, accompanied by Choi Jae-seok, ISU Speed Skating Technical Committee member.

== Records ==
Prior to this competition, the existing world, Olympic and track records were as follows.

World record	Martina Sáblíková (CZE)	6:42.66	Salt Lake City, United States	18 February 2011
Olympic record	Claudia Pechstein (GER)	6:46.91	Salt Lake City, United States	23 February 2002
Track record	Martina Sáblíková (CZE)	6:52.38		11 February 2017

The following record was set during this competition.

Date	Round	Athlete	Country	Time	Record
16 February	Pair 4	Esmee Visser	Netherlands	6:50.23	TR

TR = track record

== Results ==
The races were started at 20:00.

Rank	Pair	Lane	Name	Country	Time	Time behind	Notes
1st place, gold medalist(s)	4	O	Esmee Visser	Netherlands	6:50.23	–	TR
2nd place, silver medalist(s)	6	O	Martina Sáblíková	Czech Republic	6:51.85	+1.62	
3rd place, bronze medalist(s)	6	I	Natalya Voronina	Olympic Athletes from Russia	6:53.98	+3.75	
4	1	I	Annouk van der Weijden	Netherlands	6:54.17	+3.94	
5	5	I	Ivanie Blondin	Canada	6:59.38	+9.15	
6	3	O	Isabelle Weidemann	Canada	6:59.88	+9.65	
7	1	O	Maryna Zuyeva	Belarus	7:04.41	+14.18	
8	5	O	Claudia Pechstein	Germany	7:05.43	+15.20	
9	4	I	Misaki Oshigiri	Japan	7:07.71	+17.48	
10	2	I	Jelena Peeters	Belgium	7:10.26	+20.03	
11	2	O	Carlijn Schoutens	United States	7:13.28	+23.05	
12	3	I	Nana Takagi	Japan	7:17.45	+27.22	
