= 2012 World Junior Speed Skating Championships =

The 2012 World Junior Speed Skating Championships was held in Obihiro, Japan, from 2–4 March 2012.

Russian skater Pavel Kulizhnikov originally won the gold medal in the 1000 meter race and the bronze medal in the 500 meter race, but was later disqualified from the tournament (along with the Russian boys team pursuit) and suspended for a doping violation.

== Medal summary ==
=== Medal events ===
==== Men ====
Event	Gold	Silver	Bronze
Allround	Sverre Lunde Pedersen (NOR)	Thomas Krol (NED)	Simen Spieler Nilsen (NOR)
500 m	Laurent Dubreuil (CAN)	Tsubasa Hasegawa (JPN)	Kim Woo-jin (KOR)
1000 m	Håvard Holmefjord Lorentzen (NOR)	Tommi Pulli (FIN)	Laurent Dubreuil (CAN)
1500 m	Sverre Lunde Pedersen (NOR)	Thomas Krol (NED)	Håvard Holmefjord Lorentzen (NOR)
5000 m	Sverre Lunde Pedersen (NOR)	Simen Spieler Nilsen (NOR)	Kim Cheol-min (KOR)
Team pursuit	Norway; Sverre Lunde Pedersen; Håvard Holmefjord Lorentzen; Kristian Reistad Fredriksen	South Korea; Kim Jin-su; Kim Cheol-min; Lee Jin-yeong	Netherlands; Thomas Krol; Jorjan Jorritsma; Kai Verbij

==== Women ====
Event	Gold	Silver	Bronze
Allround	Miho Takagi (JPN)	Karolína Erbanová (CZE)	Kim Bo-reum (KOR)
500 m	Karolína Erbanová (CZE)	Kim Hyun-yung (KOR)	Miho Takagi (JPN)
1000 m	Miho Takagi (JPN)	Karolína Erbanová (CZE)	Kate Hanly (CAN)
1500 m	Karolína Erbanová (CZE)	Kim Bo-reum (KOR)	Pien Keulstra (NED)
3000 m	Park Do-yeong (KOR)	Kim Bo-reum (KOR)	Pien Keulstra (NED)
Team pursuit	South Korea; Park Do-yeong; Kim Bo-reum; Lim Jung-soo	Japan; Miho Takagi; Nana Takagi; Saori Toi	Russia; Anna Chernova; Aleksandra Stshelkonogova; Tatyana Ushakova

=== Medal table ===
Rank	Nation	Gold	Silver	Bronze	Total
1	Norway	5	1	2	8
2	South Korea	2	4	3	9
3	Czech Republic	2	2	0	4
4	Japan	2	1	1	4
5	Canada	1	1	2	4
6	Netherlands	0	2	3	5
7	Finland	0	1	0	1
8	Russia	0	0	1	1
Totals (8 entries)		12	12	12	36

== See also ==
- Speed skating at the 2012 Winter Youth Olympics
