= 2020 World Single Distances Speed Skating Championships – Men's 1500 metres =

Men's 1500 metres at the 2020 World Single Distances Speed Skating Championships
- Venue: Utah Olympic Oval
- Location: Salt Lake City, United States
- Dates: February 16
- Competitors: 24 from 13 nations
- Winning time: 1:41.66

Medalists
gold medal	Kjeld Nuis	Netherlands
silver medal	Thomas Krol	Netherlands
bronze medal	Joey Mantia	United States

The Men's 1500 metres competition at the 2020 World Single Distances Speed Skating Championships was held on February 16, 2020.

== Results ==
The race was started at 13:25.

Rank	Pair	Lane	Name	Country	Time	Diff
1st place, gold medalist(s)	12	i	Kjeld Nuis	Netherlands	1:41.66	
2nd place, silver medalist(s)	11	o	Thomas Krol	Netherlands	1:41.73	+0.07
3rd place, bronze medalist(s)	5	o	Joey Mantia	United States	1:42.16	+0.50
4	12	o	Ning Zhongyan	China	1:42.33	+0.67
5	7	i	Denis Yuskov	Russia	1:42.34	+0.68
6	1	o	Seitaro Ichinohe	Japan	1:42.36	+0.70
7	9	o	Antoine Gélinas-Beaulieu	Canada	1:42.55	+0.89
8	8	o	Sindre Henriksen	Norway	1:43.34	+1.68
9	7	o	Tyson Langelaar	Canada	1:43.39	+1.73
10	4	i	Sverre Lunde Pedersen	Norway	1:43.628	+1.96
10	10	i	Patrick Roest	Netherlands	1:43.628	+1.96
12	5	i	Masaya Yamada	Japan	1:43.83	+2.17
13	9	i	Livio Wenger	Switzerland	1:44.09	+2.43
14	6	o	Daniil Beliaev	Russia	1:44.12	+2.46
15	11	i	Kim Min-seok	South Korea	1:44.22	+2.56
16	3	o	Emery Lehman	United States	1:44.25	+2.59
17	4	o	Sergey Trofimov	Russia	1:44.31	+2.65
18	8	i	Allan Dahl Johansson	Norway	1:44.70	+3.04
19	2	i	Connor Howe	Canada	1:44.80	+3.14
20	1	i	Vitaliy Schigolev	Kazakhstan	1:45.59	+3.93
21	3	i	Marcin Bachanek	Poland	1:45.61	+3.95
22	2	o	Francesco Betti	Italy	1:46.70	+5.04
23	6	i	Mathias Vosté	Belgium	1:46.73	+5.07
–	10	o	Takuro Oda	Japan	Disqualified	
