= 2022 European Speed Skating Championships – Men's 1500 metres =

Men's 1500 metres at the 2022 European Speed Skating Championships
- Venue: Thialf
- Location: Heerenveen, Netherlands
- Dates: 9 January
- Competitors: 19 from 8 nations
- Winning time: 1:43.60

Medalists
gold medal	Kjeld Nuis	Netherlands
silver medal	Thomas Krol	Netherlands
bronze medal	Allan Dahl Johansson	Norway

The men's 1500 metres competition at the 2022 European Speed Skating Championships was held on 9 January 2022.

== Results ==
The race was started at 14:32.

Rank	Pair	Lane	Name	Country	Time	Diff
1st place, gold medalist(s)	9	o	Kjeld Nuis	Netherlands	1:43.60	
2nd place, silver medalist(s)	10	i	Thomas Krol	Netherlands	1:43.91	+0.31
3rd place, bronze medalist(s)	8	o	Allan Dahl Johansson	Norway	1:44.16	+0.56
4	6	o	Daniil Aldoshkin	Russia	1:44.81	+1.21
5	6	i	Sergey Trofimov	Russia	1:45.28	+1.68
6	10	o	Bart Swings	Belgium	1:45.82	+2.22
7	9	i	Peder Kongshaug	Norway	1:45.89	+2.29
8	7	o	Daniil Beliaev	Russia	1:46.15	+2.55
9	5	o	Stefan Emele	Germany	1:46.57	+2.97
10	1	o	Tijmen Snel	Netherlands	1:46.61	+3.01
11	8	i	Kristian Ulekleiv	Norway	1:46.64	+3.04
12	7	i	Mathias Vosté	Belgium	1:47.11	+3.51
13	2	o	Moritz Klein	Germany	1:47.26	+3.66
14	3	i	Alessio Trentini	Italy	1:47.28	+3.68
15	5	i	Jakub Piotrowski	Poland	1:48.23	+4.63
16	4	i	Zbigniew Bródka	Poland	1:48.36	+4.76
17	2	i	Francesco Betti	Italy	1:48.91	+5.31
18	4	o	Marcin Bachanek	Poland	1:49.12	+5.52
19	3	o	Konrád Nagy	Hungary	1:49.49	+5.89
