= 2019 World Single Distances Speed Skating Championships – Men's 1500 metres =

Men's 1500 metres at the 2019 World Single Distances Speed Skating Championships
- Venue: Max Aicher Arena
- Location: Inzell, Germany
- Dates: 10 February
- Competitors: 24 from 13 nations
- Winning time: 1:42.58

Medalists
gold medal	Thomas Krol	Netherlands
silver medal	Sverre Lunde Pedersen	Norway
bronze medal	Denis Yuskov	Russia

The Men's 1500 metres competition at the 2019 World Single Distances Speed Skating Championships was held on 10 February 2019.

== Results ==
The race was started at 15:25.

Rank	Pair	Lane	Name	Country	Time	Diff
1st place, gold medalist(s)	10	i	Thomas Krol	Netherlands	1:42.58	
2nd place, silver medalist(s)	7	i	Sverre Lunde Pedersen	Norway	1:43.16	+0.58
3rd place, bronze medalist(s)	10	o	Denis Yuskov	Russia	1:43.20	+0.62
4	11	o	Seitaro Ichinohe	Japan	1:43.54	+0.96
5	12	i	Kjeld Nuis	Netherlands	1:43.60	+1.02
6	6	i	Ning Zhongyan	China	1:44.27	+1.69
7	11	i	Patrick Roest	Netherlands	1:44.97	+2.39
8	9	i	Joey Mantia	United States	1:45.24	+2.66
9	4	o	Antoine Gélinas-Beaulieu	Canada	1:45.267	+2.68
10	8	i	Masaya Yamada	Japan	1:45.268	+2.68
11	8	o	Bart Swings	Belgium	1:45.39	+2.81
12	2	i	Takuro Oda	Japan	1:45.42	+2.84
13	4	i	Sindre Henriksen	Norway	1:45.77	+3.19
14	7	o	Sergey Trofimov	Russia	1:45.890	+3.31
15	5	o	Mathias Vosté	Belgium	1:45.895	+3.31
16	9	o	Håvard Bøkko	Norway	1:45.93	+3.35
17	5	i	Sergey Gryaztsov	Russia	1:46.54	+3.96
18	1	o	Zbigniew Bródka	Poland	1:46.92	+4.34
19	6	o	Kim Jin-su	South Korea	1:46.96	+4.38
20	12	o	Kim Min-seok	South Korea	1:47.10	+4.52
21	2	o	Haralds Silovs	Latvia	1:47.23	+4.65
22	1	i	Joel Dufter	Germany	1:47.52	+4.94
23	3	i	Alessio Trentini	Italy	1:47.91	+5.33
24	3	o	Connor Howe	Canada	1:48.26	+5.68
