= 2020 KNSB Dutch Single Distance Championships – Women's 5000 m =

Dutch speed skating competition

- Venue: Thialf, Heerenveen
- Dates: 29 December 2019
- Competitors: 10 skaters

Medalist women
1st place, gold medalist(s)		Esmee Visser	NED
2nd place, silver medalist(s)		Irene Schouten	NED
3rd place, bronze medalist(s)		Carlijn Achtereekte	NED

The women's 5000 meter at the 2020 KNSB Dutch Single Distance Championships in Heerenveen took place at Thialf ice skating rink on Sunday 29 December 2019.

== Statistics ==
=== Result ===
Position	Skater	Time
1st place, gold medalist(s)	Esmee Visser	6:50.96
2nd place, silver medalist(s)	Irene Schouten	6:54.87 PR
3rd place, bronze medalist(s)	Carlijn Achtereekte	6:55.04
4	Reina Anema	7:03.83
5	Carien Kleibeuker	7:03.90
6	Melissa Wijfje	7:07.77
7	Ineke Dedden	7:08.53
8	Aveline Hijlkema	7:14.05 PR
9	Imke Vormeer	7:14.46
10	Esther Kiel	7:23.79

Referee: Frank Zwitser. Assistant: Suzan van den Belt
Starter: Peter van Muiswinkel
Start: 13:10 hr. Finish: 13:52 hr.

=== Draw ===
Heat	Inner lane	Outer lane
1	Imke Vormeer	Carien Kleibeuker
2	Ineke Dedden	Esther Kiel
3	Aveline Hijlkema	Melissa Wijfje
4	Esmee Visser	Irene Schouten
5	Carlijn Achtereekte	Reina Anema
