= 2019–20 ISU Speed Skating World Cup =

ISU Speed Skating World Cup
- Dates: 15 November 2019 – 8 March 2020

The 2019–20 ISU Speed Skating World Cup, officially the ISU World Cup Speed Skating 2019–2020, was a series of six international speed skating competitions that ran from November 2019 through March 2020.

== Calendar ==
The detailed schedule for the season.

WC #	Location	Venue	Date	500 m	1000 m	1500 m	3000 m	5000 m	10000 m	Mass start	Team pursuit	Team sprint
1	Minsk, Belarus	Minsk Arena	15–17 Nov	m, w	m, w	m, w	w	m		m, w		m, w
2	Tomaszów Mazowiecki, Poland	Ice Arena	22–24 Nov	m, w		m, w	w	m		m, w	m, w	m, w
3	Nur-Sultan, Kazakhstan	Alau Ice Palace	6–8 Dec	m, w	m, w	m, w		w	m		m, w	m, w
4	Nagano, Japan	M-Wave	13–15 Dec	2m, 2w	m, w		w	m		m, w	m, w	m, w
5	Calgary, Canada	Calgary Olympic Oval	7–8 Feb	m, w	m, w	m, w	w	m				
6	Heerenveen, Netherlands	Thialf	7–8 Mar	2m, 2w	m, w	m, w	w	m		m, w		
Total				8m, 8w	5m, 5w	5m, 5w	5w	5m, 1w	1m	4m, 4w	3m, 3w	4m, 4w

== Men's standings ==
=== 500 m ===
Final classification

Rank	Name	Points
1	(Japan) Tatsuya Shinhama	483
2	(Russia) Viktor Mushtakov	433
3	(Canada) Laurent Dubreuil	420
4	(South Korea) Kim Jun-ho	404
5	(Japan) Yuma Murakami	400

=== 1000 m ===
Final classification

Rank	Name	Points
1	(Netherlands) Thomas Krol	294
2	(Netherlands) Kai Verbij	272
3	(Canada) Laurent Dubreuil	251
4	(Netherlands) Kjeld Nuis	230
5	(China) Ning Zhongyan	216

=== 1500 m ===
Final classification

Rank	Name	Points
1	(Netherlands) Kjeld Nuis	282
2	(China) Ning Zhongyan	266
3	(Netherlands) Thomas Krol	259
4	(Netherlands) Patrick Roest	228
5	(Russia) Denis Yuskov	224

=== Long distances ===
Final classification

Rank	Name	Points
1	(Netherlands) Patrick Roest	360
2	(Russia) Danila Semerikov	323
3	(Canada) Graeme Fish	306
4	(Canada) Ted-Jan Bloemen	292
5	(Russia) Alexander Rumyantsev	263

=== Mass start ===
Final classification

Rank	Name	Points
1	(Belgium) Bart Swings	570
2	(United States) Joey Mantia	569
3	(South Korea) Chung Jae-won	462
4	(South Korea) Um Cheon-ho	430
5	(Russia) Danila Semerikov	429

=== Team pursuit ===
Final classification

Rank	Name	Points
1	Russia	312
2	Japan	302
3	Canada	290
4	Italy	286
5	Netherlands	268

=== Team sprint ===
Final classification

Rank	Name	Points
1	Netherlands	440
2	Switzerland	316
3	Kazakhstan	290
4	Canada	288
5	China	284

== Women's standings ==
=== 500 m ===
Final classification

Rank	Name	Points
1	(Japan) Nao Kodaira	528
2	(Russia) Angelina Golikova	504
3	(Russia) Olga Fatkulina	474
4	(Austria) Vanessa Herzog	436
5	(Russia) Daria Kachanova	432

=== 1000 m ===
Final classification

Rank	Name	Points
1	(United States) Brittany Bowe	326
2	(Japan) Nao Kodaira	256
3	(Russia) Olga Fatkulina	242
4	(Netherlands) Jutta Leerdam	233
5	(Russia) Daria Kachanova	231

=== 1500 m ===
Final classification

Rank	Name	Points
1	(Netherlands) Ireen Wüst	342
2	(Japan) Miho Takagi	260
3	(Russia) Evgeniia Lalenkova	260
4	(Netherlands) Melissa Wijfje	243
5	(Netherlands) Antoinette de Jong	222

=== Long distances ===
Final classification

Rank	Name	Points
1	(Czech Republic) Martina Sábliková	357
2	(Canada) Isabelle Weidemann	353
3	(Canada) Ivanie Blondin	314
4	(Russia) Natalya Voronina	311
5	(Netherlands) Antoinette de Jong	274

=== Mass start ===
Final classification

Rank	Name	Points
1	(Canada) Ivanie Blondin	548
2	(Netherlands) Irene Schouten	492
3	(Japan) Nana Takagi	442
4	(South Korea) Kim Bo-reum	399
5	(Netherlands) Melissa Wijfje	396

=== Team pursuit ===
Final classification

Rank	Name	Points
1	Canada	324
2	Russia	312
3	Netherlands	302
4	Japan	256
5	United States	238

=== Team sprint ===
Final classification

Rank	Name	Points
1	Netherlands	468
2	Russia	444
3	China	338
4	South Korea	296
5	Japan	288
