= 2020 World Sprint Speed Skating Championships – Men =

Men at the 2020 World Sprint Speed Skating Championships
- Venue: Vikingskipet
- Location: Hamar, Norway
- Dates: 28–29 February
- Competitors: 28 from 13 nations
- Winning points: 137.465

Medalists
gold medal	Tatsuya Shinhama	Japan
silver medal	Laurent Dubreuil	Canada
bronze medal	Cha Min-kyu	South Korea

The Men competition at the 2020 World Sprint Speed Skating Championships was held on 28 and 29 February 2020.

== Results ==
=== 500 m ===
The race started on 28 February at 18:07.

Rank	Pair	Lane	Name	Country	Time	Diff
1	13	O	Laurent Dubreuil	Canada	34.55	
2	14	I	Tatsuya Shinhama	Japan	34.58	+0.03
3	11	O	Pavel Kulizhnikov	Russia	34.60	+0.05
4	12	I	Ruslan Murashov	Russia	34.65	+0.10
5	11	I	Cha Min-kyu	South Korea	34.71	+0.16
6	14	O	Viktor Mushtakov	Russia	34.83	+0.28
7	13	I	Yamato Matsui	Japan	34.89	+0.34
8	7	O	Håvard Holmefjord Lorentzen	Norway	34.90	+0.35
9	9	I	Kai Verbij	Netherlands	34.93	+0.38
10	8	O	Dai Dai Ntab	Netherlands	35.08	+0.53
11	12	O	Daichi Yamanaka	Japan	35.09	+0.54
12	8	I	Joel Dufter	Germany	35.11	+0.56
13	10	O	Nico Ihle	Germany	35.15	+0.60
14	7	I	Artur Nogal	Poland	35.24	+0.69
15	3	I	Kjeld Nuis	Netherlands	35.29	+0.74
16	2	I	Kim Young-jin	South Korea	35.34	+0.79
17	2	O	Henrik Fagerli Rukke	Norway	35.46	+0.91
18	9	O	David La Rue	Canada	35.48	+0.93
19	4	I	Mathias Vosté	Belgium	35.53	+0.98
20	10	I	Ignat Golovatsiuk	Belarus	35.55	+1.00
21	5	I	Ning Zhongyan	China	35.56	+1.01
22	3	O	Hendrik Dombek	Germany	35.61	+1.06
23	6	O	Alexander Klenko	Kazakhstan	35.62	+1.07
24	1	O	Odin By Farstad	Norway	35.69	+1.14
25	5	O	Damian Żurek	Poland	35.74	+1.19
26	1	I	Artur Galiyev	Kazakhstan	35.82	+1.27
27	6	I	David Bosa	Italy	35.89	+1.34
28	4	O	Chung Jae-woong	South Korea	1:21.55	+47.00

=== 1000 m ===
The race started on 28 February at 19:46.

Rank	Pair	Lane	Name	Country	Time	Diff
1	6	O	Tatsuya Shinhama	Japan	1:08.28	
2	8	O	Joel Dufter	Germany	1:08.65	+0.37
3	7	I	Yamato Matsui	Japan	1:08.69	+0.41
4	12	I	Kjeld Nuis	Netherlands	1:08.73	+0.45
5	12	O	Laurent Dubreuil	Canada	1:08.79	+0.51
6	14	O	Pavel Kulizhnikov	Russia	1:08.89	+0.61
7	13	O	Håvard Holmefjord Lorentzen	Norway	1:08.95	+0.67
8	11	O	Kai Verbij	Netherlands	1:08.96	+0.68
9	13	I	Nico Ihle	Germany	1:09.11	+0.83
10	11	I	Ning Zhongyan	China	1:09.23	+0.95
11	1	I	Cha Min-kyu	South Korea	1:09.26	+0.98
12	10	I	Mathias Vosté	Belgium	1:09.28	+1.00
13	2	O	Dai Dai Ntab	Netherlands	1:09.75	+1.47
14	7	O	Ignat Golovatsiuk	Belarus	1:10.19	+1.91
15	9	O	David La Rue	Canada	1:10.20	+1.92
16	14	I	Ruslan Murashov	Russia	1:10.32	+2.03
17	5	I	Artur Nogal	Poland	1:10.45	+2.17
18	5	O	Artur Galiyev	Kazakhstan	1:10.49	+2.21
19	8	I	Odin By Farstad	Norway	1:10.57	+2.29
20	4	O	Daichi Yamanaka	Japan	1:10.64	+2.36
20	6	I	Chung Jae-woong	South Korea	1:10.64	+2.36
22	3	O	Hendrik Dombek	Germany	1:10.82	+2.54
23	1	O	Henrik Fagerli Rukke	Norway	1:10.88	+2.60
24	4	I	Damian Żurek	Poland	1:10.90	+2.62
25	2	I	Kim Young-jin	South Korea	1:10.92	+2.64
25	10	O	David Bosa	Italy	1:10.92	+2.64
27	3	I	Alexander Klenko	Kazakhstan	1:11.25	+2.97
–	9	I	Viktor Mushtakov	Russia	Withdrawn	

=== 500 m ===
The race started on 29 February at 11:07.

Rank	Pair	Lane	Name	Country	Time	Diff
1	12	O	Tatsuya Shinhama	Japan	34.39	
2	12	I	Laurent Dubreuil	Canada	34.56	+0.17
3	10	O	Cha Min-kyu	South Korea	34.72	+0.33
4	11	O	Yamato Matsui	Japan	34.90	+0.51
5	9	O	Kai Verbij	Netherlands	35.04	+0.65
5	9	I	Dai Dai Ntab	Netherlands	35.04	+0.65
7	8	I	Daichi Yamanaka	Japan	35.09	+0.70
8	11	I	Håvard Holmefjord Lorentzen	Norway	35.15	+0.76
9	4	O	Artur Nogal	Poland	35.24	+0.85
10	3	O	Ignat Golovatsiuk	Belarus	35.30	+0.91
11	8	O	Joel Dufter	Germany	35.45	+1.06
11	7	O	Kjeld Nuis	Netherlands	35.45	+1.06
13	10	I	Nico Ihle	Germany	35.47	+1.08
14	2	O	Kim Young-jin	South Korea	35.54	+1.15
15	2	I	Chung Jae-woong	South Korea	35.63	+1.24
16	4	I	Damian Żurek	Poland	35.64	+1.25
16	6	O	Mathias Vosté	Belgium	35.64	+1.25
18	7	I	Henrik Fagerli Rukke	Norway	35.73	+1.34
19	5	O	Ning Zhongyan	China	35.76	+1.37
20	5	I	Hendrik Dombek	Germany	35.82	+1.43
21	3	I	Alexander Klenko	Kazakhstan	35.95	+1.56
22	1	O	Artur Galiyev	Kazakhstan	36.16	+1.77
23	1	I	David Bosa	Italy	36.20	+1.81
24	6	I	Odin By Farstad	Norway	36.24	+1.85
–	–		David La Rue	Canada	Withdrawn	
–	–		Ruslan Murashov	Russia	Withdrawn	
–	–		Pavel Kulizhnikov	Russia	Withdrawn	

=== 1000 m ===
The race was started at 13:59.

Rank	Pair	Lane	Name	Country	Time	Diff
1	10	O	Kjeld Nuis	Netherlands	1:08.38	
2	11	I	Laurent Dubreuil	Canada	1:08.39	+0.01
3	12	I	Tatsuya Shinhama	Japan	1:08.71	+0.32
4	12	O	Cha Min-kyu	South Korea	1:08.73	+0.35
5	10	I	Kai Verbij	Netherlands	1:08.74	+0.36
6	9	I	Håvard Holmefjord Lorentzen	Norway	1:08.84	+0.45
7	7	O	Mathias Vosté	Belgium	1:08.99	+0.61
8	6	O	Ning Zhongyan	China	1:09.03	+0.65
9	9	O	Nico Ihle	Germany	1:09.29	+0.90
10	8	I	Joel Dufter	Germany	1:09.44	+1.06
11	7	I	Dai Dai Ntab	Netherlands	1:09.47	+1.09
12	11	O	Yamato Matsui	Japan	1:09.89	+1.51
13	5	I	Ignat Golovatsiuk	Belarus	1:09.95	+1.57
14	6	I	Daichi Yamanaka	Japan	1:10.20	+1.82
15	3	O	Alexander Klenko	Kazakhstan	1:10.47	+2.09
16	2	O	Odin By Farstad	Norway	1:10.55	+2.16
17	8	O	Artur Nogal	Poland	1:10.69	+2.31
18	2	I	Artur Galiyev	Kazakhstan	1:10.72	+2.34
19	4	O	Damian Żurek	Poland	1:10.80	+2.42
20	3	I	Hendrik Dombek	Germany	1:10.91	+2.52
21	4	I	Henrik Fagerli Rukke	Norway	1:10.96	+2.58
22	5	O	Kim Young-jin	South Korea	1:11.18	+2.79
23	1	I	David Bosa	Italy	1:11.58	+3.20
–	–		Chung Jae-woong	South Korea	Withdrawn	

=== Overall standings ===
After all races.

Rank	Name	Country	500m	1000m	500m	1000m	Points	Diff
1st place, gold medalist(s)	Tatsuya Shinhama	Japan	34.58	1:08.28	34.39	1:08.71	137.465	
2nd place, silver medalist(s)	Laurent Dubreuil	Canada	34.55	1:08.79	34.56	1:08.39	137.700	+0.24
3rd place, bronze medalist(s)	Cha Min-kyu	South Korea	34.71	1:09.26	34.72	1:08.73	138.425	+0.96
4	Kai Verbij	Netherlands	34.93	1:08.96	35.04	1:08.74	138.820	+1.36
5	Håvard Holmefjord Lorentzen	Norway	34.90	1:08.95	35.15	1:08.84	138.945	+1.48
6	Yamato Matsui	Japan	34.89	1:08.69	34.90	1:09.89	139.080	+1.62
7	Kjeld Nuis	Netherlands	35.29	1:08.73	35.45	1:08.38	139.295	+1.83
8	Joel Dufter	Germany	35.11	1:08.65	35.45	1:09.44	139.605	+2.14
9	Dai Dai Ntab	Netherlands	35.08	1:09.75	35.04	1:09.47	139.730	+2.27
10	Nico Ihle	Germany	35.15	1:09.11	35.47	1:09.29	139.820	+2.36
11	Mathias Vosté	Belgium	35.53	1:09.28	35.64	1:08.99	140.305	+2.84
12	Ning Zhongyan	China	35.56	1:09.23	35.76	1:09.03	140.450	+2.99
13	Daichi Yamanaka	Japan	35.09	1:10.64	35.09	1:10.20	140.600	+3.14
14	Ignat Golovatsiuk	Belarus	35.55	1:10.19	35.30	1:09.95	140.920	+3.46
15	Artur Nogal	Poland	35.24	1:10.45	35.24	1:10.69	141.050	+3.59
16	Kim Young-jin	South Korea	35.34	1:10.92	35.54	1:11.18	141.930	+4.47
17	Henrik Fagerli Rukke	Norway	35.46	1:10.88	35.73	1:10.96	142.110	+4.65
18	Damian Żurek	Poland	35.74	1:10.90	35.64	1:10.80	142.230	+4.77
19	Hendrik Dombek	Germany	35.61	1:10.82	35.82	1:10.91	142.295	+4.83
20	Alexander Klenko	Kazakhstan	35.62	1:11.25	35.95	1:10.47	142.430	+4.97
21	Odin By Farstad	Norway	35.69	1:10.57	36.24	1:10.55	142.490	+5.03
22	Artur Galiyev	Kazakhstan	35.82	1:10.49	36.16	1:10.72	142.585	+5.12
23	David Bosa	Italy	35.89	1:10.92	36.20	1:11.58	143.340	+5.88
	Chung Jae-woong	South Korea	1:21.55	1:10.64	35.63	DNS	Did not finish	
	Pavel Kulizhnikov	Russia	34.60	1:08.89	Did not start		Did not finish	
	Ruslan Murashov	Russia	34.65	1:10.32	Did not start		Did not finish	
	David La Rue	Canada	35.48	1:10.20	Did not start		Did not finish	
	Viktor Mushtakov	Russia	34.83	Did not start			Did not finish	
