= Esmee Visser =

Dutch speed skater

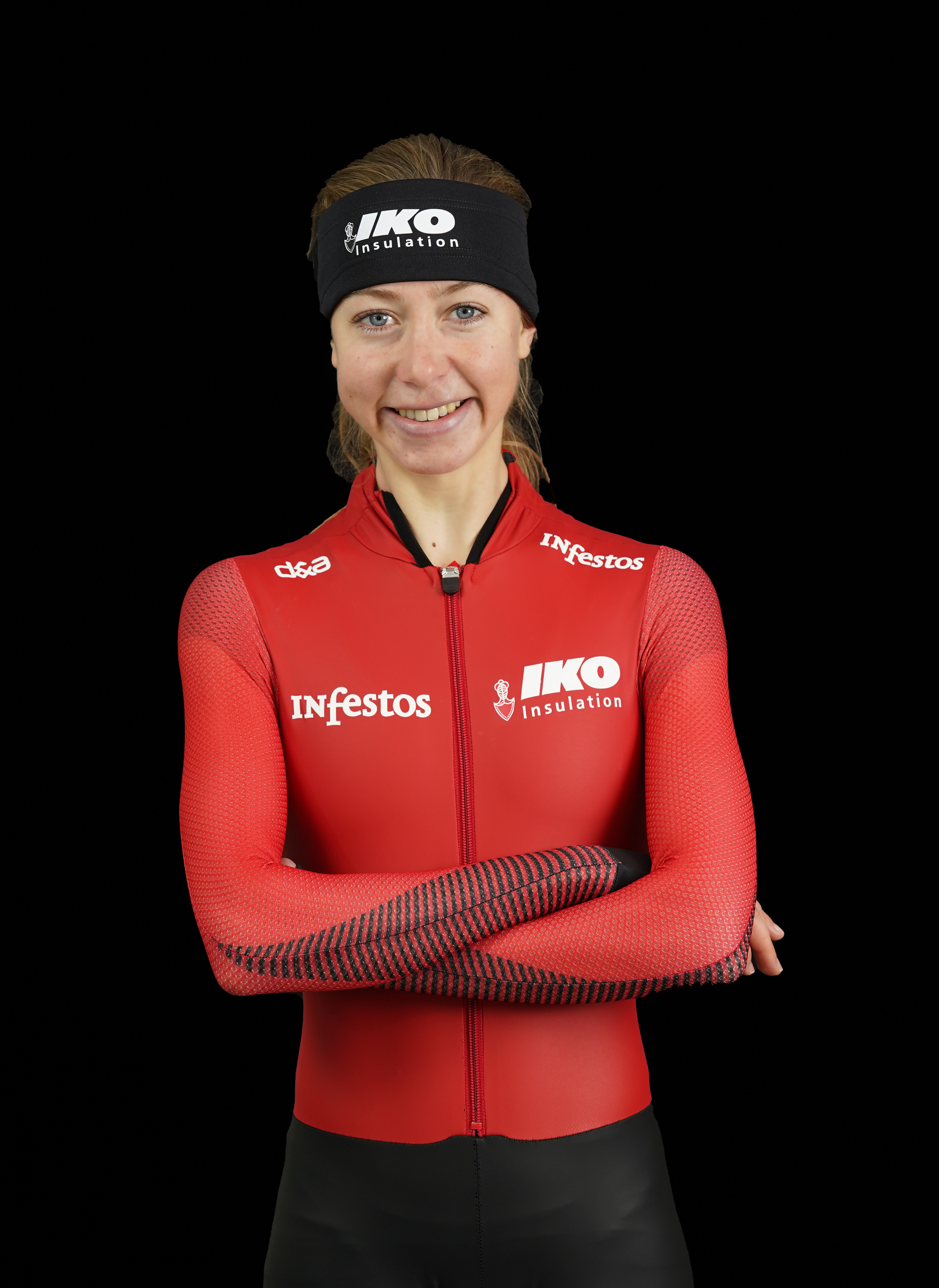
- Visser in 2020

Personal information
- Full name: Esmee Michelle Visser
- Nationality: Dutch
- Born: 27 January 1996 (age 30) Leiden, Netherlands
- Height: 1.70 m (5 ft 7 in)
- Weight: 51 kg (112 lb)

Sport
- Country: Netherlands
- Sport: Speed skating
- Events: 3000 m, 5000 m
- Club: TalentNED
Medal record
Women's speed skating
Representing the Netherlands
Olympic Games
Gold medal – first place	2018 Pyeongchang	5000 m
World Single Distances Championships
Silver medal – second place	2019 Inzell	5000 m
Bronze medal – third place	2020 Salt Lake City	5000 m
European Championships
Gold medal – first place	2018 Kolomna	3000 m
Gold medal – first place	2020 Heerenven	3000 m

Esmee Michelle Visser (Dutch pronunciation: [ɛsˈmeː ˈvɪsər]; born 26 January 1996) is a Dutch speed skater and Olympic Champion who specialises in long-distance events.

Born in Leiden, she qualified for the 5000 metres at the 2018 Winter Olympics in December 2017. At the 2018 European Championships, she won the 3000 metres in her second-ever international race. On 16 February 2018, she won the gold medal in the women's 5000 metres at the 2018 Winter Olympics with a time of 6:50.23.

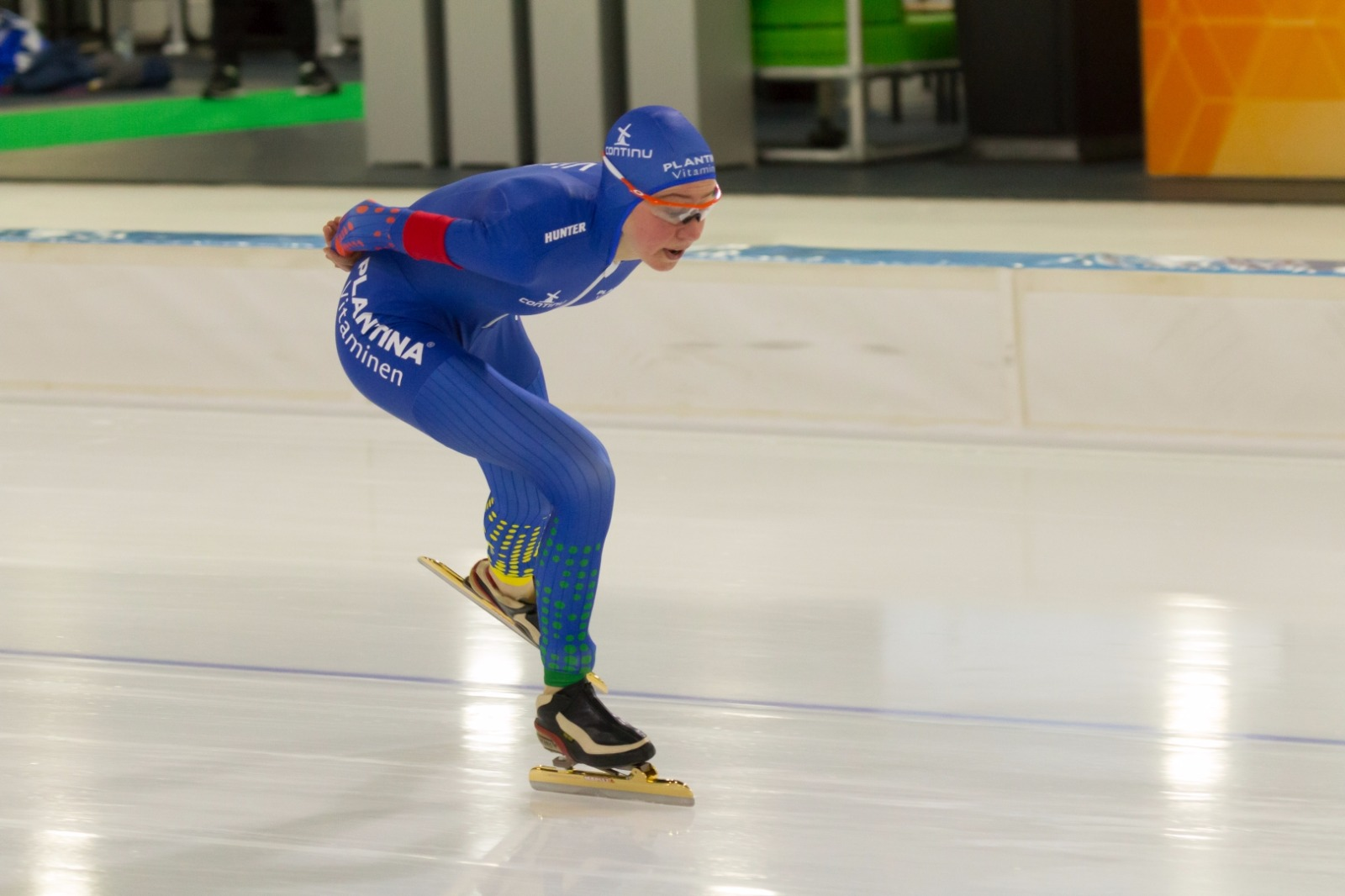
Visser in 2017

At the first competition weekend of the 2018–19 ISU World Cup in Obihiro, Japan, she won the 3000m event, the first World Cup victory of her career.

== Personal records ==
Personal records
Speed skating
Event	Result	Date	Location	Notes
500 m	41.42	25 January 2020	Thialf, Heerenveen	
1000 m	1:19.81	19 January 2019	Thialf, Heerenveen	
1500 m	1:57.69	27 January 2019	Thialf, Heerenveen	
3000 m	3:54.02	9 March 2019	Utah Olympic Oval, Salt Lake City	
5000 m	6:45.73	23 February 2019	Olympic Oval, Calgary	

At the end of the 2019–20 speed skating season, Visser occupied the 43rd position on the adelskalender with a points total of 160.226

== Tournament overview ==
Season	Dutch Championships Single Distances	Dutch Championships Allround	World Championships Junior	Dutch Championships Junior	European Championships Single Distances	World Championships Single Distances	Olympic Games	World Cup GWC
2013–14				31st 500m 4th 1500m 21st 1000m (bronze) 3000m 9th overall				
2014–15		22nd 500m 17th 3000m 20th 1500m DNQ 5000m 17th overall	WARSAW 22nd 1500m 7th 3000m (gold) Team pursuit	22nd 500m (bronze) 1500m 8th 1000m (bronze) 3000m 4th overall				
2015–16	21st 1500m 16th 3000m	20th 500m 10th 3000m 11th 1500m DNQ 5000m 11th overall						
2016–17	18th 1500m 9th 3000m 6th 5000m	20th 500m 9th 3000m 12th 1500m DNQ 5000m 12th overall						
2017–18	11th 3000m 5th 5000m				KOLOMNA (gold) 3000m		GANGNEUNG (gold) 5000m	
2018–19	4th 3000m (gold) 5000m	17th 500m (gold) 3000m 5th 1500m (gold) 5000m (bronze) overall				INZELL (silver) 5000m		(silver) 3000/5000m
2019–20	11th 1500m (gold) 3000m (gold) 5000m	16th 500m 5th 3000m DNP 1500m DNP 5000m NC overall			HEERENVEEN (gold) 3000m	SALT LAKE CITY 5th 3000m (bronze) 5000m		45th 1500m 10th 3000/5000m
2020–21	11th 3000m 4th 5000m	20th 500m 4th 3000m 16th 1500m (silver) 5000m 8th overall						

- DNQ : Did not qualify for the 5000m distance
- DNP : Did not participate
- GWC : Grand World Cup
- NC : No classification

== World Cup overview ==
Season	1500m				
2017–18					
2018–19					
2019–20	–	–	7th(b)	–	–

Season	3000/5000 meter					
2017–18	–	1st (b)	–	–	–	–
2018–19	1st place, gold medalist(s)	12th	1st place, gold medalist(s)	4th	4th	2nd place, silver medalist(s)
2019–20	9th	5th	4th	–	6th	8th

- (b) = Division B
- – = Did not participate

== Medals won ==
Championship	Gold (gold)	Silver (silver)	Bronze (bronze)
Dutch Allround Classification	0	0	1
Dutch Allround Distances	2	0	0
Dutch Single Distances	3	0	0
World Single Distances	1	1	1
World Cup 3000/5000m	2	1	0
World Cup Classification	0	1	0
European Single Distances	1	0	0
Olympic Games	1	0	0
World Junior Team Pursuit	1	0	0
