= 2018–19 ISU Speed Skating World Cup =

International speed skating competition

ISU Speed Skating World Cup
- Dates: 16 November 2018 – 10 March 2019

The 2018–19 ISU Speed Skating World Cup, officially the ISU World Cup Speed Skating 2018–2019, was a series of six international speed skating competitions that ran from November 2018 through March 2019.

== Calendar ==
The detailed schedule for the season:

WC #	Location	Venue	Date	500 m	1000 m	1500 m	3000 m	5000 m	10000 m	Mass start	Team pursuit	Team sprint
1	Obihiro, Japan	Meiji Hokkaido-Tokachi Oval	16–18 Nov	2m, 2w	m, w	m, w	w	m		m, w	m, w	m, w
2	Tomakomai, Japan	Tomakomai Highland Sport Center	23–25 Nov	2m, 2w	m, w	m, w	w	m		m, w	m, w	m, w
3	Tomaszów Mazowiecki, Poland	Ice Arena	7–9 Dec	2m, 2w	m, w	m, w		w	m		m, w	m, w
4	Heerenveen, Netherlands	Thialf	14–16 Dec	m, w	m, w	m, w	w	m		m, w		
5	Hamar, Norway	Vikingskipet	1–3 Feb	2m, 2w	m, w	m, w	w	m				
6	Salt Lake City, USA	Utah Olympic Oval	9–10 Mar	2m, 2w	m, w	m, w	w	m		m, w		
Total				11m, 11w	6m, 6w	6m, 6w	5w	5m, 1w	1m	4m, 4w	3m, 3w	3m, 3w

Note: the men's 5000 and 10000 metres were contested as one cup, and the women's 3000 and 5000 metres were contested as one cup, as indicated by the color coding.

== Men's standings ==
=== 500 m ===
Rank	Name	Points
1	(Russia) Pavel Kulizhnikov	630
2	(Japan) Tatsuya Shinhama	594
3	(Norway) Håvard Holmefjord Lorentzen	498

=== 1000 m ===
Rank	Name	Points
1	(Netherlands) Kjeld Nuis	342
2	(Netherlands) Kai Verbij	304
3	(Russia) Pavel Kulizhnikov	303

=== 1500 m ===
Rank	Name	Points
1	(Russia) Denis Yuskov	319
2	(South Korea) Min Seok Kim	279
3	(Netherlands) Kjeld Nuis	274

=== Long distance ===
Rank	Name	Points
1	(Russia) Aleksandr Rumyantsev	322
2	(Netherlands) Marcel Bosker	320
3	(Norway) Sverre Lunde Pedersen	317

=== Mass start ===
Rank	Name	Points
1	(South Korea) Um Cheon-ho	535
2	(Belgium) Bart Swings	502
3	(Russia) Ruslan Zakharov	434

=== Team pursuit ===
Rank	Name	Points
1	Norway	312
2	Russia	302
3	Japan	302

=== Team sprint ===
Rank	Name	Points
1	Netherlands	336
2	Norway	304
3	Russia	296

== Women's standings ==
=== 500 m ===
Rank	Name	Points
1	(Austria) Vanessa Herzog	708
2	(Japan) Nao Kodaira	600
3	(Russia) Olga Fatkulina	587

=== 1000 m ===
Rank	Name	Points
1	(United States) Brittany Bowe	397
2	(Japan) Miho Takagi	310
3	(Japan) Nao Kodaira	298

=== 1500 m ===
Rank	Name	Points
1	(United States) Brittany Bowe	378
2	(Japan) Miho Takagi	331
3	(Netherlands) Ireen Wüst	303

=== Long distance ===
Rank	Name	Points
1	(Czech Republic) Martina Sáblíková	370
2	(Netherlands) Esmee Visser	343
3	(Russia) Natalya Voronina	335

=== Mass start ===
Rank	Name	Points
1	(South Korea) Kim Bo-reum	478
2	(Netherlands) Irene Schouten	456
3	(Italy) Francesca Lollobrigida	414

=== Team pursuit ===
Rank	Name	Points
1	Japan	360
2	Russia	300
3	Canada	290

=== Team sprint ===
Rank	Name	Points
1	Russia	314
2	Netherlands	312
3	Japan	308
