= 2019 World Sprint Speed Skating Championships =

International speed skating competition

- Location: Heerenveen, Netherlands
- Venue: Thialf
- Dates: 23–24 February

The 2019 World Sprint Speed Skating Championships was held at the Thialf in Heerenveen, Netherlands, from 23 to 24 February 2019.

== Schedule ==
All times are local (UTC+1).

Date	Time	Event
23 February	15:00	500 m women
23 February	15:00	500 m men
23 February	15:00	1000 m women
23 February	15:00	1000 m men
24 February	15:00	500 m women
24 February	15:00	500 m men
24 February	15:00	1000 m women
24 February	15:00	1000 m men

== Medal summary ==
=== Medal table ===
* Host nation (Netherlands)

Rank	Nation	Gold	Silver	Bronze	Total
1	Japan (JPN)	1	2	0	3
2	Russia (RUS)	1	0	0	1
3	Netherlands (NED)*	0	0	1	1
3	United States (USA)	0	0	1	1
Totals (4 entries)		2	2	2	6

=== Medalists ===
Event	Gold		Silver		Bronze	
Men	Pavel Kulizhnikov; Russia	137.390	Tatsuya Shinhama; Japan	137.805	Kjeld Nuis; Netherlands	137.860
Women	Nao Kodaira; Japan	149.665	Miho Takagi; Japan	150.050	Brittany Bowe; United States	150.180
