= 2017–18 ISU Speed Skating World Cup =

2017–2018 series of speed skating competitions

ISU Speed Skating World Cup
- Dates: 10 November 2017 – 18 March 2018

The 2017–18 ISU Speed Skating World Cup, officially the ISU World Cup Speed Skating 2017–2018, was a series of international speed skating competitions that ran the entire season. Compared to previous seasons, there were fewer competition weekends; the season was restricted due to the 2018 Winter Olympics, which were arranged in Pyeongchang, South Korea, during February 2018.

== Calendar ==
The detailed schedule for the season.

WC #	City	Venue	Date	500 m	1000 m	1500 m	3000 m	5000 m	10000 m	Mass start	Team pursuit	Team sprint
1	Heerenveen	Thialf	10–12 November	2m, 2w	m, w	m, w	w	m		m, w	m, w	m, w
2	Stavanger	Sørmarka Arena	17–19 November	2m, 2w	m, w	m, w		w	m			m, w
3	Calgary	Olympic Oval	1–3 December	2m, 2w	m, w	m, w	w	m		m, w	m, w	
4	Salt Lake City	Utah Olympic Oval	8–10 December	2m, 2w	m, w	m, w	w	m		m, w	m, w	m, w
	Kolomna	Kolomna Speed Skating Center	5–7 January	2018 European Speed Skating Championships								
5	Erfurt	Gunda Niemann-Stirnemann Halle	19–21 January	2m, 2w	2m, 2w	m, w	w	m				
	PyeongChang	Gangneung Oval	2–25 February	2018 Winter Olympic games								
	Changchun	Jilin Provincial Speed Skating Rink	3–4 March	2018 World Sprint Speed Skating Championships								
	Amsterdam	Olympic Stadium	9–10 March	2018 World Allround Speed Skating Championships								
6	Minsk	Minsk-Arena	17–18 March	2m, 2w	m, w	m, w	w	m		m, w	m, w	m, w
Total				12m, 12w	7m, 7w	6m, 6w	5w	5m, 1w	1m	5m, 5w	4m, 4w	4m, 4w

Note: the men's 5000 and 10000 metres were contested as one cup, and the women's 3000 and 5000 metres were contested as one cup, as indicated by the color coding.

In addition, there were two combination cups, the allround combination and the sprint combination. For the allround combination, the distances were 1500 + 5000 metres for men, and 1500 + 3000 metres for women. For the sprint combination, the distances were 500 + 1000 metres, both for men and women. These cups were contested only in World Cup 5, in Stavanger, Norway.

== Men's standings ==
=== 500 m ===
Rank	Name	Points
1	(Norway) Håvard Holmefjord Lorentzen	716
2	(Netherlands) Hein Otterspeer	568
3	(Netherlands) Ronald Mulder	556

=== 1000 m ===
Rank	Name	Points
1	(Netherlands) Kjeld Nuis	530
2	(Norway) Håvard Holmefjord Lorentzen	516
3	(Netherlands) Kai Verbij	440

=== 1500 m ===
Rank	Name	Points
1	(Russia) Denis Yuskov	520
2	(Norway) Sverre Lunde Pedersen	385
3	(Netherlands) Thomas Krol	320

=== 5000 and 10000 m ===
Rank	Name	Points
1	(Canada) Ted-Jan Bloemen	486
2	(Norway) Sverre Lunde Pedersen	445
3	(Netherlands) Sven Kramer	300

=== Mass start ===
Rank	Name	Points
1	(Belgium) Bart Swings	234
2	(Italy) Andrea Giovannini	226
3	(South Korea) Lee Seung-hoon	218

=== Team pursuit ===
Rank	Name	Points
1	Norway	345
2	Italy	305
3	Japan	284

=== Team sprint ===
Rank	Name	Points
1	Norway	370
2	Russia	314
3	Canada	300

=== Grand World Cup ===
Rank	Name	Points
1	(Norway) Håvard Holmefjord Lorentzen	734
2	(Russia) Denis Yuskov	715
3	(Norway) Sverre Lunde Pedersen	700

== Women's standings ==
=== 500 m ===
Rank	Name	Points
1	(Austria) Vanessa Herzog	795
2	(Czech Republic) Karolína Erbanová	786
3	(Russia) Angelina Golikova	709

=== 1000 m ===
Rank	Name	Points
1	(Russia) Yekaterina Shikhova	444
2	(Netherlands) Marrit Leenstra	420
3	(Norway) Hege Bøkko	393

=== 1500 m ===
Rank	Name	Points
1	(Japan) Miho Takagi	550
2	(Netherlands) Marrit Leenstra	390
3	(Russia) Yekaterina Shikhova	281

=== 3000 and 5000 m ===
Rank	Name	Points
1	(Netherlands) Antoinette de Jong	445
2	(Canada) Ivanie Blondin	439
3	(Russia) Natalya Voronina	391

=== Mass start ===
Rank	Name	Points
1	(Italy) Francesca Lollobrigida	324
2	(Japan) Ayano Sato	290
3	(Canada) Ivanie Blondin	257

=== Team pursuit ===
Rank	Name	Points
1	Japan	450
2	Germany	299
3	Netherlands	280

=== Team sprint ===
Rank	Name	Points
1	Russia	350
2	Norway	344
3	Netherlands	230

=== Grand World Cup ===
Rank	Name	Points
1	(Japan) Miho Takagi	1040
2	(Netherlands) Marrit Leenstra	770
3	(Japan) Nao Kodaira	700
