= Elena Sokhryakova =

Russian speed skater

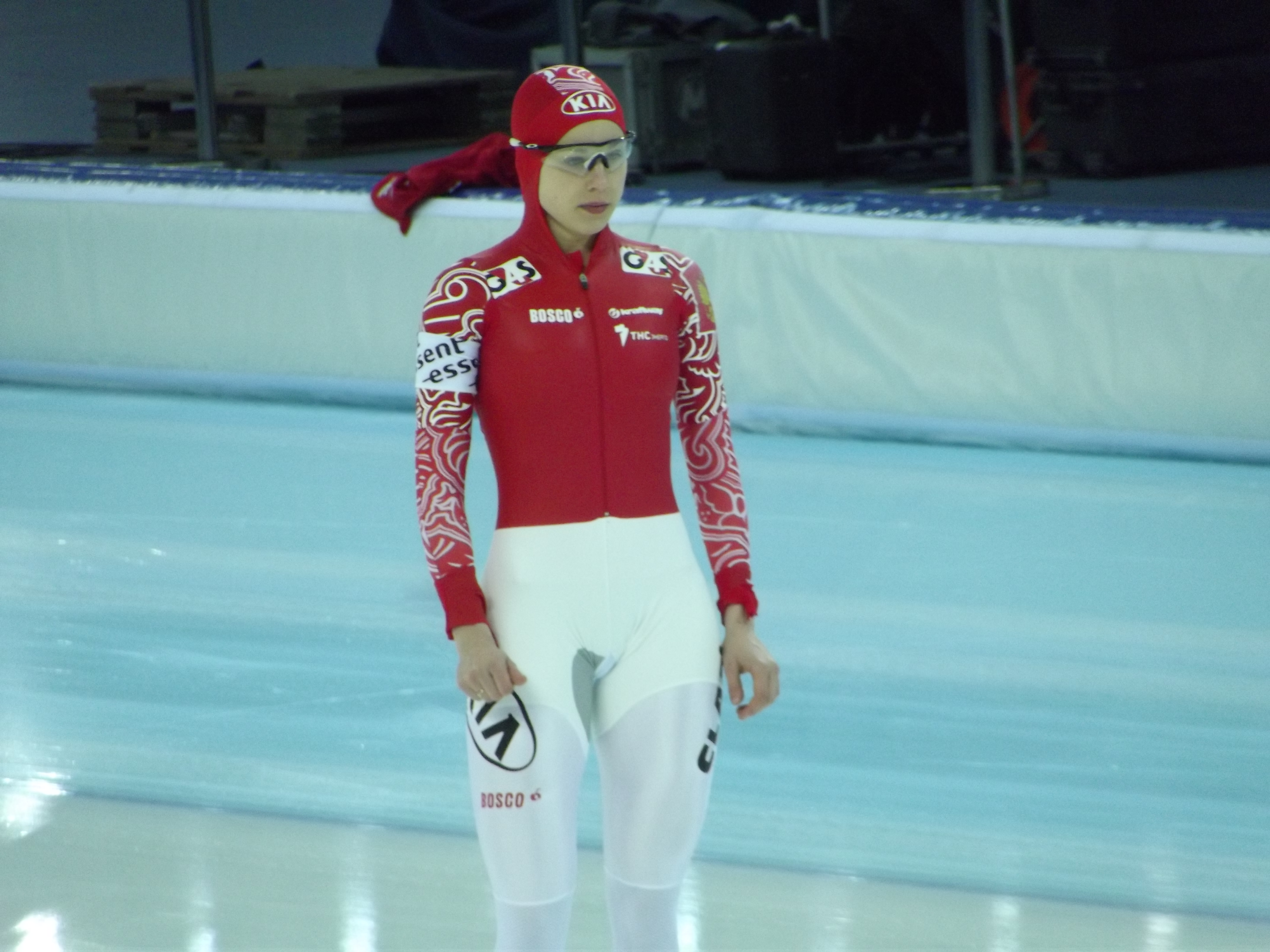
- Sokhryakova at the 2013 World Single Distance Speed Skating Championships

Personal information
- Born: 4 November 1990 (age 35) Ulan-Ude, Russia
- Height: 1.67 m (5 ft 6 in)

Sport
- Country: Russia
- Sport: Speed skating

Elena Sokhryakova (born 4 November 1990) is a Russian long track speed skater.

At the 2022 Winter Olympics, she finished 22nd in the 1500 metres.
