= Thomas Krol =

Dutch speed skater

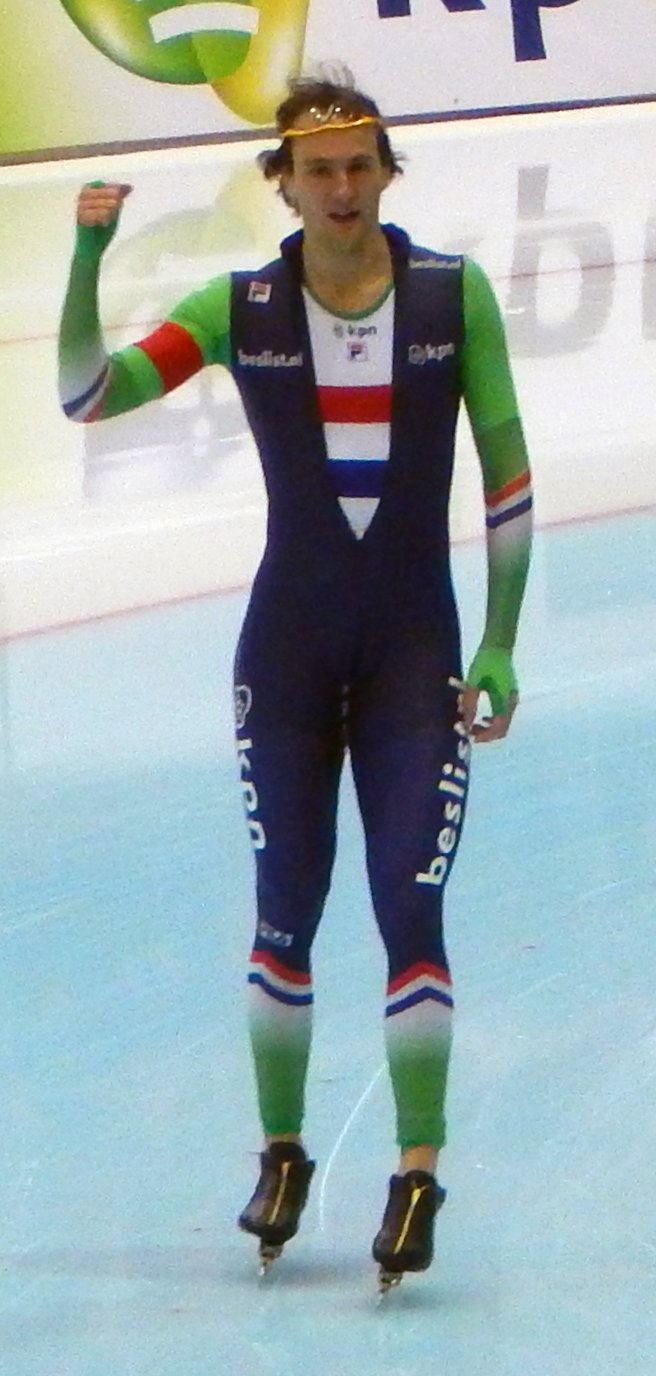
- Krol wins bronze in Kolomna in 2016

Personal information
- Nationality: Dutch
- Born: 16 August 1992 (age 33) Deventer, Netherlands
- Height: 1.92 m (6 ft 4 in)
- Weight: 86 kg (190 lb)

Sport
- Country: Netherlands
- Sport: Speed skating
- Event(s): 500m, 1000m, 1500m
- Turned pro: 2010
- Retired: 2024
Medal record
Men's speed skating
Representing the Netherlands
Olympic Games
Gold medal – first place	2022 Beijing	1000 m
Silver medal – second place	2022 Beijing	1500 m
World Single Distance Championships
Gold medal – first place	2019 Inzell	1500 m
Gold medal – first place	2020 Salt Lake City	Team sprint
Gold medal – first place	2021 Heerenveen	1500 m
Silver medal – second place	2019 Inzell	1000 m
Silver medal – second place	2020 Salt Lake City	1500 m
Silver medal – second place	2023 Heerenveen	1000 m
Bronze medal – third place	2016 Kolomna	1500 m
Bronze medal – third place	2023 Heerenveen	1500 m
World Sprint Championships
Gold medal – first place	2022 Hamar	Sprint
Bronze medal – third place	2022 Hamar	Team sprint
European Championships
Gold medal – first place	2020 Heerenveen	1500 m
Gold medal – first place	2021 Heerenveen	Sprint
Gold medal – first place	2022 Heerenveen	1000 m
Silver medal – second place	2018 Kolomna	1500 m
Silver medal – second place	2020 Heerenveen	1000 m
Silver medal – second place	2022 Heerenveen	1500 m

Thomas Krol (born 16 August 1992) is a retired Dutch speed skater and Olympic gold medalist, who specialized in the 1000m and 1500m.

== Career ==
Krol finished third at the ISU World Cup 1500m event in Berlin in December 2014.

In February 2022, Krol represented the Netherlands at the 2022 Winter Olympics in Beijing. He won a silver medal in the 1500m and, ten days later, claimed gold in the 1000m, clocking 1:07.92 to become Olympic champion.

In February 2024, the Dutchman announced his retirement and his intention to enroll in the KLM airline flight school. According to Krol, he had two dreams: to win the Olympics and to become a pilot.

== Personal records ==
Personal records
Speed skating
Event	Result	Date	Location	Notes
500-meter	34.90	16 January 2021	Thialf, Heerenveen	
1000 meter	1:06.25	9 March 2019	Utah Olympic Oval, Salt Lake City	
1500 meter	1:40.54	10 March 2019	Utah Olympic Oval, Salt Lake City	
3000 meter	3:42.86	30 September 2017	Max Aicher Arena, Inzell	
5000 meter	6:46.30	28 December 2010	Thialf, Heerenveen	
10000 meter	14:40.13	18 March 2012	nl:IJsbaan Twente, Enschede	

== Tournament overview ==
Season	Olympic Games	Dutch Championships Single Distances	Dutch Championships Sprint	Dutch Championships Allround	European Championships Sprint	World Championships Single Distances	World Cup GWC	World Championships Junior	European Championships Single Distances
2010–11		HEERENVEEN 13th 500m 15th 1000m		HEERENVEEN (bronze) 500m 21st 5000m 9th 1500m DNQ 10000m 13th overall				SEINÄJOKI 6th 500m 10th 3000m (bronze) 1500m 9th 5000m 8th overall 7th 1000m 4th 1500m (gold) Team pursuit	
2011–12		HEERENVEEN 13th 1000m 15th 1500m						OBIHIRO 4th 500m 9th 3000m 2nd 1500m 7th 5000m (silver) overall 6th 1000m (silver) 1500m (bronze) Team Pursuit	
2012–13		HEERENVEEN 16th 500m 12th 1000m 4th 1500m	HEERENVEEN 19th 500m 12th 1000m 20th 500m 13th 1000m 15th overall	HEERENVEEN (bronze) 500m 19th 5000m 6th 1500m DNQ 10000m 11th overall			28th 1500m		
2013–14		HEERENVEEN 14th 500m 9th 1000m 9th 1500m	HEERENVEEN 22nd 500m (silver) 1000m 12th 500m 8th 1000m 20th overall				31st 1000m 36th 1500m		
2014–15		HEERENVEEN 12th 500m 9th 1000m (bronze) 1500m	HEERENVEEN 14th 500m 6th 1000m 14th 500m 7th 1000m 9th overall				8th 1500m		
2015–16		HEERENVEEN NC 500m 4th 1000m (silver) 1500m	HEERENVEEN 12th 500m (bronze) 1000m 13th 500m 6th 1000m 7th overall			KOLOMNA (bronze) 1500m	10th 1000m 7th 1500m		
2016–17		HEERENVEEN 10th 500m 6th 1000m 5th 1500m	HEERENVEEN 10th 500m 4th 1000m 10th 500m (silver) 1000m 5th overall				55th 500m 7th 1000m 8th 1500m		
2017–18		HEERENVEEN 4th 1000m (silver) 1500m	HEERENVEEN 6th 500m (gold) 1000m 5th 500m (gold) 1000m (bronze) overall				5th 1000m (bronze) 1500m		
2018–19		HEERENVEEN 8th 500m (silver) 1000m (bronze) 1500m			COLLALBO 12th 500m 19th 1000m 11th 500m (gold) 1000m 17th overall	INZELL (silver) 1000m (gold) 1500m	(gold) 1500m		
2019–20		HEERENVEEN (gold) 1000m (gold) 1500m				SALT LAKE CITY DQ 1000m (silver) 1500m	(gold) 1000m (bronze) 1500m (gold) Team sprint		HEERENVEEN (silver) 1000m (gold) 1500m
2020–21		HEERENVEEN (gold) 1000m (gold) 1500m	HEERENVEEN 7th 500m (silver) 1000m 18th 500m (gold) 1000m 4th overall		HEERENVEEN 4th 500m (gold) 1000m 8th 500m (gold) 1000m (gold) overall	HEERENVEEN DQ 1000m (gold) 1500m	(silver) 1000m (gold) 1500m		
2021–22	BEIJING 18th 500m (gold) 1000m (silver) 1500m	HEERENVEEN (bronze) 1000m (gold) 1500m					(gold) 1000m 4th 1500m		HEERENVEEN (gold) 1000m (silver) 1500m
2022–23		HEERENVEEN 6th 500m-1 DNS 500m-2 (bronze) 1000m (silver) 1500m	HEERENVEEN 10th 500m (silver) 1000m 10th 500m (silver) 1000m 6th overall			HEERENVEEN (silver) 1000m (bronze) 1500m	4th 1000m 9th 1500m		

== World Cup overview ==
Season	1000 meter						
2012–2013							
2013–2014	–	–	–	1st(b)	–	–	
2014–2015							
2015–2016	13th	10th	5th	9th	–	3rd place, bronze medalist(s)	7th
2016–2017	8th	14th	12th	11th	–	8th	4th
2017–2018	16th	3rd place, bronze medalist(s)	7th	8th	7th	5th	5th
2018–2019	3rd place, bronze medalist(s)	3rd place, bronze medalist(s)	–	5th	2nd place, silver medalist(s)	2nd place, silver medalist(s)	
2019–2020	1st place, gold medalist(s)	1st place, gold medalist(s)	–	2nd place, silver medalist(s)	1st place, gold medalist(s)		
2020–2021	1st place, gold medalist(s)	2nd place, silver medalist(s)					
2021–2022	2nd place, silver medalist(s)	1st place, gold medalist(s)	1st place, gold medalist(s)	–	2nd place, silver medalist(s)		
2022–2023	5th	5th	8th	2nd place, silver medalist(s)	–	4th	

Season	1500 meter					
2012–2013	18th	–	3rd(b)	–	–	–
2013–2014	–	–	–	3rd(b)	–	–
2014–2015	9th	10th	3rd place, bronze medalist(s)	13th	4th	5th
2015–2016	6th	10th	4th	4th	4th	DNF
2016–2017	9th	16th	8th	9th	–	4th
2017–2018	3rd place, bronze medalist(s)	5th	7th	3rd place, bronze medalist(s)	–	4th
2018–2019	4th	3rd place, bronze medalist(s)	–	1st place, gold medalist(s)	–	2nd place, silver medalist(s)
2019–2020	3rd place, bronze medalist(s)	1st place, gold medalist(s)	4th	–	2nd place, silver medalist(s)	
2020–2021	1st place, gold medalist(s)	1st place, gold medalist(s)				
2021–2022	16th	5th	3rd place, bronze medalist(s)		2nd place, silver medalist(s)	
2022–2023	16th	3rd place, bronze medalist(s)	7th	3rd place, bronze medalist(s)	–	8th

Season	Team sprint			
2012–2013				
2013–2014				
2014–2015				
2015–2016				
2016–2017				
2017–2018				
2018–2019				
2019–2020	1st place, gold medalist(s)	1st place, gold medalist(s)	1st place, gold medalist(s)	–
2020–2021				
2021–2022				
2022–2023				

- – = Did not participate
- (b) = Division B
- DNF = Did not finish

== Medals won ==
Championship	Gold (gold)	Silver (silver)	Bronze (bronze)
Dutch Single Distances	4	3	2
Dutch Sprint	4	3	2
Dutch Allround	0	0	2
European Sprint	4	0	0
World Single Distances	2	2	1
World Cup	15	7	11
European Single Distances	2	2	0
World Junior	1	2	2
