= Natalya Voronina =

Russian speed skater (born 1994)

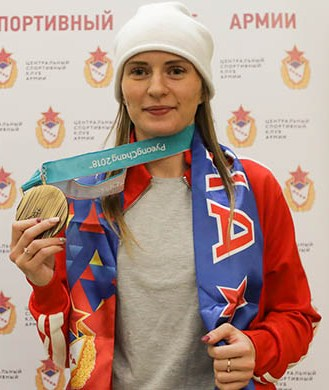
- Voronina in 2018

Personal information
- Native name: Наталья Сергеевна Воронина
- Full name: Natalya Sergeevna Voronina
- Nationality: (Russia) Russian
- Born: 21 October 1994 (age 31) Nizhny Novgorod, Russia
- Height: 1.63 m (5 ft 4 in)
- Weight: 54 kg (119 lb)

Sport
- Country: Russia
- Sport: Speed skating
- Event(s): 3000 m, 5000 m
- Club: Central Sports Army Club
Medal record
Representing Olympic Athletes from Russia
Olympic Games
Bronze medal – third place	2018 Pyeongchang	5000 m
Representing Russia
World Single Distance Championships
Gold medal – first place	2020 Salt Lake City	5000 m
Bronze medal – third place	2015 Heerenveen	Team pursuit
Bronze medal – third place	2016 Kolomna	Team pursuit
Bronze medal – third place	2017 Gangneung	Team pursuit
Bronze medal – third place	2019 Inzell	3000 m
Bronze medal – third place	2019 Inzell	5000 m
Bronze medal – third place	2019 Inzell	Team pursuit
Bronze medal – third place	2020 Salt Lake City	3000 m
European Championships
Silver medal – second place	2018 Kolomna	Team pursuit
Silver medal – second place	2020 Heerenveen	3000 m
Silver medal – second place	2020 Heerenveen	Team pursuit
Bronze medal – third place	2018 Kolomna	3000 m
Bronze medal – third place	2022 Heerenveen	Team pursuit
Representing Russian Skating Union
World Single Distances Championships
Silver medal – second place	2021 Heerenveen	5000 m
Bronze medal – third place	2021 Heerenveen	Team pursuit

Natalya Sergeevna Voronina (Russian: Наталья Сергеевна Воронина; born 21 October 1994) is a Russian speed skater. She is a World Champion and a world record holder in the 5000 m event.

Voronina is the current Russian record holder in the 3000 and 5000 metres.

== Career ==
Voronina finished third in the 3000 meters at the 2015–16 World Cup event in Calgary on 15 November 2015 in a personal and national record of 3:58.78. At the same event she also finished third in the team pursuit. On 20 November, at the second World Cup event in Salt Lake City, Voronina won silver in the 5000 meters, bettering the Russian record to 6:53.16. She won bronze in team sprint at the third World Cup event in Inzell (together with Olga Graf, Elizaveta Kazelina and Margarita Ryzhova). On 11–13 March, at the World Cup Final in Heerenveen, Voronina won gold in the women's 3000 m. Her results rank 2nd in the overall rankings for the 2015–16 World Cup Season in women's 3000 meters behind Czech Martina Sábliková.

== Personal records ==
Personal records
Speed skating
Event	Result	Date	Location	Notes
500 m	39.66	7 November 2015	Olympic Oval, Calgary	
1000 m	1:18.85	28 February 2015	Olympic Oval, Calgary	
1500 m	1:55.58	3 December 2017	Olympic Oval, Calgary	
3000 m	3:54.07	9 March 2019	Utah Olympic Oval, Salt Lake City	NR
5000 m	6:39.02	15 February 2020	Utah Olympic Oval, Salt Lake City	WR, NR

She is currently in 17th position in the adelskalender with a points total of 158.841.

== World Cup results ==
=== Podiums ===
Date	Season	Location	Rank	Event
13 November 2015	2015–16	Calgary	3rd place, bronze medalist(s)	3000 m
14 November 2015	2015–16	Calgary	3rd place, bronze medalist(s)	Team pursuit
20 November 2015	2015–16	Salt Lake City	2nd place, silver medalist(s)	5000 m
5 December 2015	2015–16	Inzell	3rd place, bronze medalist(s)	Team pursuit
11 December 2015	2015–16	Heerenveen	1st place, gold medalist(s)	3000 m
12 November 2016	2016–17	Harbin	2nd place, silver medalist(s)	Team pursuit
19 November 2016	2016–17	Nagano	3rd place, bronze medalist(s)	Team pursuit
3 December 2016	2016–17	Astana	3rd place, bronze medalist(s)	Team pursuit
11 March 2017	2016–17	Stavanger	3rd place, bronze medalist(s)	Team pursuit
12 November 2017	2017–18	Heerenveen	2nd place, silver medalist(s)	3000 m
10 December 2017	2017–18	Salt Lake City	1st place, gold medalist(s)	3000 m
16 November 2018	2018–19	Obihiro	3rd place, bronze medalist(s)	Team pursuit
18 November 2018	2018–19	Obihiro	2nd place, silver medalist(s)	3000 m
23 November 2018	2018–19	Tomakomai	3rd place, bronze medalist(s)	Team pursuit
7 December 2018	2018–19	Tomaszów Mazowiecki	2nd place, silver medalist(s)	Team pursuit
1 February 2019	2018–19	Hamar	2nd place, silver medalist(s)	3000 m
9 March 2019	2018–19	Salt Lake City	3rd place, bronze medalist(s)	3000 m
22 November 2019	2019–20	Tomaszów Mazowiecki	3rd place, bronze medalist(s)	3000 m
23 November 2019	2019–20	Tomaszów Mazowiecki	1st place, gold medalist(s)	Team pursuit
8 December 2019	2019–20	Nur-Sultan	3rd place, bronze medalist(s)	Team pursuit
15 December 2019	2019–20	Nagano	3rd place, bronze medalist(s)	Team pursuit
7 February 2020	2019–20	Calgary	3rd place, bronze medalist(s)	3000 m
31 January 2021	2020–21	Heerenveen	1st place, gold medalist(s)	3000 m

=== Overall rankings ===
Season	Event	Rank
2015–16	3000 and 5000 m	2nd place, silver medalist(s)
2017–18	3000 and 5000 m	3rd place, bronze medalist(s)
2018–19	3000 and 5000 m	3rd place, bronze medalist(s)
2020–21	3000 and 5000 m	3rd place, bronze medalist(s)
