= Tatsuya Shinhama =

Japanese speed skater (born 1996)

Personal information
- Nationality: Japanese
- Born: 11 July 1996 (age 30) Betsukai, Hokkaido, Japan
- Height: 1.83 m (6 ft 0 in)

Sport
- Country: Japan
- Sport: Speed skating
- Events: 500 m, 1000 m
- Club: Takasaki University of Health and Welfare
Medal record
World Single Distance Championships
| Bronze medal – third place | 2020 Salt Lake City | 500 m |
World Sprint Championships
| Gold medal – first place | 2020 Hamar | Sprint |
| Silver medal – second place | 2019 Heerenveen | Sprint |
World University Championships
| Gold medal – first place | 2018 Minsk | 500 m |
| Gold medal – first place | 2018 Minsk | 1000 m |
Four Continents Championships
| Silver medal – second place | 2025 Hachinohe | 1000 m |
| Bronze medal – third place | 2024 Salt Lake City | 500 m |
| Bronze medal – third place | 2024 Salt Lake City | 1000 m |
| Bronze medal – third place | 2025 Hachinohe | 500 m |

Tatsuya Shinhama (born 11 July 1996) is a Japanese speed skater who is specialized in the sprint distances.

== Career ==
In March 2018 Shinhama won the gold medal at the 500m and 1000m events of the World University Speed Skating Championships in Minsk, Belarus. At the first competition weekend of the 2018–19 ISU Speed Skating World Cup in Obihiro, Japan in March he finished third in the first 500m event. At the second competition weekend in Tomakomai, Japan he won both 500m events, his first victories on the World Cup circuit.

== Personal records ==
Personal records
Speed skating
| Event | Result | Date | Location | Notes |
| 500 m | 33.79 | 9 March 2019 | Utah Olympic Oval, Salt Lake City | NR |
| 1000 m | 1:06.72 | 16 December 2018 | Thialf, Heerenveen | |
| 1500 m | 1:52.14 | 26 September 2014 | Olympic Oval, Calgary | |
| 3000 m | 4:22.96 | 26 December 2014 | Akan | |
