= 2015–16 ISU Speed Skating World Cup – Men's 500 metres =

The 500 meters distance for men in the 2015–16 ISU Speed Skating World Cup was contested over 12 races on six occasions, out of a total of World Cup occasions for the season, with the first occasion taking place in Calgary, Alberta, Canada, on 13–15 November 2015, and the final occasion taking place in Heerenveen, Netherlands, on 11–13 March 2016.

The defending champion, Pavel Kulizhnikov of Russia, again won the World Cup, finishing with the same total points score as his compatriot Ruslan Murashov.

== Top three ==
Position	Athlete	Points	Previous season

== Race medallists ==
WC #	Location	Date	Gold	Time	Silver	Time	Bronze	Time	Report
1	Calgary, Canada	13 November	Pavel Kulizhnikov; Russia	34.11	Mika Poutala; Finland	34.28	William Dutton; Canada	34.46	
1	Calgary, Canada	15 November	Pavel Kulizhnikov; Russia	34.00; WR	William Dutton; Canada	34.25	Alex Boisvert-Lacroix; Canada	34.30	
2	Salt Lake City, United States	20 November	Pavel Kulizhnikov; Russia	33.98; WR	Mitchell Whitmore; United States	34.19	William Dutton; Canada	34.35	
2	Salt Lake City, United States	22 November	Pavel Kulizhnikov; Russia	34.13	William Dutton; Canada	34.34	Laurent Dubreuil; Canada	34.36	
3	Inzell, Germany	4 December	Gilmore Junio; Canada	34.86	Alexandre St-Jean; Canada	34.90	Artur Waś; Poland	34.97	
3	Inzell, Germany	6 December	Artur Waś; Poland	34.65	Alex Boisvert-Lacroix; Canada	34.74	Kai Verbij; Netherlands	34.80	
4	Heerenveen, Netherlands	11 December	Pavel Kulizhnikov; Russia	34.48	Aleksey Yesin; Russia	34.63	Alex Boisvert-Lacroix; Canada	34.78	
4	Heerenveen, Netherlands	13 December	Ruslan Murashov; Russia	34.67	Alex Boisvert-Lacroix; Canada	34.76	Espen Aarnes Hvammen; Norway	34.86	
5	Stavanger, Norway	29 January	Pavel Kulizhnikov; Russia	34.71	Ruslan Murashov; Russia	34.74	Kai Verbij; Netherlands	34.87	
5	Stavanger, Norway	31 January	Pavel Kulizhnikov; Russia	34.52	Ruslan Murashov; Russia	34.78	Gilmore Junio; Canada	34.86	
6	Heerenveen, Netherlands	11 March	Ruslan Murashov; Russia	34.96	Ronald Mulder; Netherlands	35.05	Gilmore Junio; Canada	35.12	
6	Heerenveen, Netherlands	13 March	Ronald Mulder; Netherlands	34.81	Ruslan Murashov; Russia	34.89	Mika Poutala; Finland	35.02	

== Standings ==
Standings as of 31 January 2016.

#	Name	Nat.	CGY1	CGY2	SLC1	SLC2	INZ1	INZ2	HVN1	HVN2	STA1	STA2	HVN3	HVN4	Total
1	Pavel Kulizhnikov	(Russia)	100	100	100	100	—	—	100	5	100	100			705
2	Ruslan Murashov	(Russia)	50	8	5	40	24	8	40	100	80	80	150	120	705
3	Gilmore Junio	(Canada)	19	60	28	18	100	60	24	18	60	70	104	76	637
4	Mika Poutala	(Finland)	80	36	36	60	—	50	45	32	32	12			577
5	Alex Boisvert-Lacroix	(Canada)	25	70	40	28	32	80	70	80	6	32			508
6	Artur Waś	(Poland)	40	12	8	50	70	100	60	18	8	10			492
7	Kai Verbij	(Netherlands)	16	21	60	12	16	70	50	40	70	60			487
8	William Dutton	(Canada)	70	80	70	80	8	16	10	6	28	40			468
9	Laurent Dubreuil	(Canada)	36	45	14	70	60	32	18	50	50	36			411
10	Aleksey Yesin	(Russia)	24	10	10	0	28	45	80	45	45	28			315
11	Espen Aarnes Hvammen	(Norway)	8	19	24	32	21	14	25	70	40	50			303
12	Alexandre St-Jean	(Canada)	11	6	25	36	80	12	14	60	16	14			274
13	Ryohei Haga	(Japan)	28	16	21	16	45	21	21	24	36	5			233
14	Yūya Oikawa	(Japan)	45	32	12	6	36	18	8	14	18	21			210
15	Mitchell Whitmore	(United States)	15	50	80	24	—	—	—	—	10	16			195
16	Ronald Mulder	(Netherlands)	60	40	50	14	—	—	—	—	24	—			188
17	Roman Krech	(Kazakhstan)	8	8	11	15	14	25	28	21	12	45			187
18	Hein Otterspeer	(Netherlands)	0	25	6	19	50	36	16	28	—	—			180
19	Artyom Kuznetsov	(Russia)	21	14	18	10	10	24	19	10	14	18			158
20	Kim Tae-yun	(South Korea)	14	18	16	25	12	10	0	12	25	24			156
21	Jan Smeekens	(Netherlands)	—	15	45	—	18	40	0	36	—	—			154
22	Joji Kato	(Japan)	12	28	32	45	6	5	5	0	—	—			133
23	Gerben Jorritsma	(Netherlands)	32	24	—	21	40	—	—	—	6	0			123
24	Mo Tae-bum	(South Korea)	0	0	19	8	11	15	32	15	21	—			121
25	David Bosa	(Italy)	0	4	0	8	25	28	8	8	0	6			87
26	Tsubasa Hasegawa	(Japan)	0	6	8	0	2	19	36	2	—	—			73
27	Kjeld Nuis	(Netherlands)	18	—	—	6	15	—	—	—	—	19			58
28	Artur Nogal	(Poland)	0	0	0	4	6	19	0	1	11	15			56
29	Nico Ihle	(Germany)	10	0	0	0	8	0	15	8	4	0			45
30	Jonathan Garcia	(United States)	0	—	—	—	0	6	0	11	19	6			42
31	Denis Koval	(Russia)	—	—	—	—	0	1	11	25	—	—			37
32	Piotr Michalski	(Poland)	0	0	6	0	1	0	4	19	5	0			35
33	Jesper Hospes	(Netherlands)	—	—	—	—	—	—	12	6	2	15			35
34	Xie Jiaxuan	(China)	0	0	2	11	4	0	2	0	8	0			27
35	Gao Tingyu	(China)	—	—	—	—	—	—	—	—	0	25			25
36	Kim Jun-Ho	(South Korea)	0	11	0	0	6	4	0	0	0	4			25
37	Pekka Koskela	(Finland)	6	0	0	0	0	8	6	4	0	0			24
38	Yuma Murakami	(Japan)	—	—	—	—	—	—	—	—	15	8			23
39	Mu Zhongsheng	(China)	0	1	15	5	0	0	0	0	0	0			21
40	Lee Kang-seok	(South Korea)	4	2	0	0	0	11	0	—	—	—			17
41	Mikhail Kazelin	(Russia)	—	—	—	—	—	—	—	—	1	8			9
42	Mirko Giacomo Nenzi	(Italy)	1	0	4	1	0	2	1	0	0	0			9
43	Michel Mulder	(Netherlands)	—	—	—	—	—	—	6	0	—	—			6
44	Liu Fangyi	(China)	2	0	1	0	—	—	—	—	—	—			3
45	Jang Won-hoon	(South Korea)	—	—	—	—	—	—	—	—	0	2			2
46	Sung Ching-Yang	(Chinese Taipei)	0	0	0	2	—	—	0	0	0	0			2
47	Kim Jin-su	(South Korea)	—	—	—	—	—	—	—	—	0	1			1
