= 2015–16 ISU Speed Skating World Cup – World Cup 1 – Men's 500 metres =

The men's 500 metres races of the 2015–16 ISU Speed Skating World Cup 1, arranged in the Olympic Oval, in Calgary, Alberta, Canada, were held on 13 and 15 November 2015.

Pavel Kulizhnikov of Russia won the first race, while Mika Poutala of Finland came second, and William Dutton of Canada came third. Alex Boisvert-Lacroix of Canada won the first Division B race.

Having beaten the Russian record on the first race, Kulizhnikov skated even better in the second race, winning it in 34.00 seconds, a new world record. William Dutton and Alex Boisvert-Lacroix, both of Canada, came second and third. Hein Otterspeer of the Netherlands won the second Division B race.

== Race 1 ==
Race one took place on Friday, 13 November, with Division B scheduled in the morning session, at 10:44, and Division A scheduled in the afternoon session, at 13:59.

=== Division A ===
Rank	Name	Nat.	Pair	Lane	Time	WC points	GWC points
1st place, gold medalist(s)	Pavel Kulizhnikov	(Russia)	9	i	34.11 NR	100	50
2nd place, silver medalist(s)	Mika Poutala	(Finland)	1	o	34.28 NR	80	40
3rd place, bronze medalist(s)	William Dutton	(Canada)	3	i	34.46	70	35
4	Ronald Mulder	(Netherlands)	10	i	34.48	60	30
5	Ruslan Murashov	(Russia)	6	i	34.51	50	25
6	Yūya Oikawa	(Japan)	2	o	34.58	45	—
7	Artur Waś	(Poland)	8	o	34.64	40	
8	Laurent Dubreuil	(Canada)	10	o	34.69	36	
9	Gerben Jorritsma	(Netherlands)	4	i	34.70	32	
10	Ryohei Haga	(Japan)	6	o	34.72	28	
11	Aleksey Yesin	(Russia)	4	o	34.75	24	
12	Artyom Kuznetsov	(Russia)	9	o	34.794	21	
13	Kjeld Nuis	(Netherlands)	1	i	34.799	18	
14	Kai Verbij	(Netherlands)	8	i	34.80	16	
15	Kim Tae-yun	(South Korea)	3	o	34.86	14	
16	Joji Kato	(Japan)	2	i	34.95	12	
17	Nico Ihle	(Germany)	7	i	35.14	10	
18	Espen Aarnes Hvammen	(Norway)	5	o	1:30.29	8	
19	Kim Jun-ho	(South Korea)	7	o	DNF		
19	Hein Otterspeer	(Netherlands)	5	i	DNF		

Note: NR = national record.

=== Division B ===
Rank	Name	Nat.	Pair	Lane	Time	WC points
1	Alex Boisvert-Lacroix	(Canada)	9	i	34.39	25
2	Gilmore Junio	(Canada)	12	i	34.48	19
3	Mitchell Whitmore	(United States)	10	o	34.57	15
4	Alexandre St-Jean	(Canada)	8	o	34.73	11
5	Roman Krech	(Kazakhstan)	11	o	34.79 NR	8
6	Pekka Koskela	(Finland)	7	i	34.94	6
7	Lee Kang-seok	(South Korea)	2	i	34.97	4
8	Liu Fangyi	(China)	7	o	35.01	2
9	Mirko Giacomo Nenzi	(Italy)	2	o	35.05	1
10	Artur Nogal	(Poland)	11	i	35.08	—
11	Xie Jiaxuan	(China)	13	o	35.11	
12	David Bosa	(Italy)	13	i	35.14	
13	Sung Ching-Yang	(Chinese Taipei)	4	o	35.15	
14	Mu Zhongsheng	(China)	14	o	35.24	
15	Piotr Michalski	(Poland)	1	i	35.27	
16	Tsubasa Hasegawa	(Japan)	8	i	35.33	
17	Mo Tae-bum	(South Korea)	12	o	35.48	
18	Jonathan Garcia	(United States)	6	o	35.49	
19	Daniel Greig	(Australia)	3	i	35.56	
20	Kirill Golubev	(Russia)	14	i	35.65	
21	Christian Oberbichler	(Switzerland)	5	i	35.74	
22	Joel Dufter	(Germany)	9	o	35.77	
23	David Andersson	(Sweden)	4	i	35.98	
24	Aleksandr Zhigin	(Kazakhstan)	3	o	36.14	
25	Juho Vaittinen	(Finland)	5	o	37.71	
26	Tsukasa Owada	(Japan)	10	i	37.74	
27	Liu An	(China)	6	i	46.64	

Note: NR = national record.

== Race 2 ==
Race two took place on Sunday, 15 November, with Division A scheduled at 14:27, and Division B scheduled at 17:39.

=== Division A ===
Rank	Name	Nat.	Pair	Lane	Time	WC points	GWC points
1st place, gold medalist(s)	Pavel Kulizhnikov	(Russia)	10	i	34.00 WR	100	50
2nd place, silver medalist(s)	William Dutton	(Canada)	9	i	34.25	80	40
3rd place, bronze medalist(s)	Alex Boisvert-Lacroix	(Canada)	5	i	34.300	70	35
4	Gilmore Junio	(Canada)	4	o	34.304	60	30
5	Mitchell Whitmore	(United States)	3	o	34.331	50	25
6	Laurent Dubreuil	(Canada)	7	o	34.332	45	—
7	Ronald Mulder	(Netherlands)	9	o	34.36	40	
8	Mika Poutala	(Finland)	10	o	34.44	36	
9	Yūya Oikawa	(Japan)	8	o	34.52	32	
10	Joji Kato	(Japan)	2	o	34.55	28	
11	Gerben Jorritsma	(Netherlands)	6	i	34.59	24	
12	Kai Verbij	(Netherlands)	3	i	34.60	21	
13	Kim Tae-yun	(South Korea)	2	i	34.63	18	
14	Ryohei Haga	(Japan)	6	o	34.65	16	
15	Artyom Kuznetsov	(Russia)	4	i	34.67	14	
16	Artur Waś	(Poland)	7	i	34.71	12	
17	Aleksey Yesin	(Russia)	5	o	34.74	10	
18	Ruslan Murashov	(Russia)	8	i	34.80	8	
19	Alexandre St-Jean	(Canada)	1	i	1:07.45	6	
20	Nico Ihle	(Germany)	1	o	DQ		

Note: WR = world record.

=== Division B ===
Rank	Name	Nat.	Pair	Lane	Time	WC points
1	Hein Otterspeer	(Netherlands)	2	o	34.64	25
2	Espen Aarnes Hvammen	(Norway)	13	o	34.67 NR	19
3	Jan Smeekens	(Netherlands)	1	o	34.68	15
4	Kim Jun-ho	(South Korea)	1	i	34.71	11
5	Roman Krech	(Kazakhstan)	13	i	34.75 NR	8
6	Tsubasa Hasegawa	(Japan)	7	i	34.77	6
7	David Bosa	(Italy)	9	i	34.80 NR	4
8	Lee Kang-seok	(South Korea)	12	o	34.84	2
9	Mu Zhongsheng	(China)	8	i	34.87	1
10	Mirko Giacomo Nenzi	(Italy)	11	o	34.91	—
11	Piotr Michalski	(Poland)	8	o	34.941	
12	Artur Nogal	(Poland)	10	i	34.948	
13	Mo Tae-bum	(South Korea)	7	o	35.00	
14	Tsukasa Owada	(Japan)	3	o	35.06	
15	Pekka Koskela	(Finland)	12	i	35.07	
16	Liu Fangyi	(China)	11	i	35.08	
17	Xie Jiaxuan	(China)	10	o	35.13	
18	Liu An	(China)	2	i	35.16	
19	Daniel Greig	(Australia)	6	i	35.24	
20	Kirill Golubev	(Russia)	5	i	35.33	
21	Sung Ching-Yang	(Chinese Taipei)	9	o	35.37	
22	Joel Dufter	(Germany)	4	i	35.55	
23	Juho Vaittinen	(Finland)	3	i	35.93	
24	Christian Oberbichler	(Switzerland)	5	o	35.99	
25	Fyodor Mezentsev	(Kazakhstan)	6	o	36.14	
26	David Andersson	(Sweden)	4	o	DNS	

Note: NR = national record.
