= 2015–16 ISU Speed Skating World Cup – Men's 1000 metres =

The 1000 meters distance for men in the 2015–16 ISU Speed Skating World Cup was a competition held over 7 races on six occasions, with the first occasion taking place in Calgary, Alberta, Canada, on 13–15 November 2015, and the final occasion taking place in Heerenveen, Netherlands, on 11–13 March 2016.

The defending champion was Pavel Kulizhnikov of Russia.

== Top three ==
| Position | Athlete | Points | Previous season |

== Race medallists ==
| WC # | Location | Date | Gold | Time | Silver | Time | Bronze | Time | Report |
|---|---|---|---|---|---|---|---|---|---|
| 1 | Calgary, Canada | 14 November | Gerben Jorritsma; Netherlands | 1:07.20 | Pavel Kulizhnikov; Russia | 1:07.33 | Kjeld Nuis; Netherlands | 1:07.40 | |
| 2 | Salt Lake City, United States | 21 November | Pavel Kulizhnikov; Russia | 1:06.70 | Kjeld Nuis; Netherlands | 1:07.02 | Gerben Jorritsma; Netherlands | 1:07.23 | |
| 3 | Inzell, Germany | 5 December | Kjeld Nuis; Netherlands | 1:08.31 | Denis Yuskov; Russia | 1:08.55 | Kai Verbij; Netherlands | 1:08.60 | |
| 4 | Heerenveen, Netherlands | 12 December | Pavel Kulizhnikov; Russia | 1:08:16 | Denis Yuskov; Russia | 1:08:59 | Kjeld Nuis; Netherlands | 1:08.61 | |
| 5 | Stavanger, Norway | 30 January | Pavel Kulizhnikov; Russia | 1:08.10 | Kjeld Nuis; Netherlands | 1:08.12 | Denis Yuskov; Russia | 1:08.72 | |
| 5 | Stavanger, Norway | 31 January | Pavel Kulizhnikov; Russia | 1:08.10 | Kjeld Nuis; Netherlands | 1:08.13 | Thomas Krol; Netherlands | 1:08.52 | |
| 6 | Heerenveen, Netherlands | 12 March | Kjeld Nuis; Netherlands | 1:08.94 | Kai Verbij; Netherlands | 1:09.08 | Denis Yuskov; Russia | 1:09.22 | |

== Standings ==
| # | Name | Nat. | CGY | SLC | INZ | HVN1 | STA1 | STA2 | HVN2 | Total |
|---|---|---|---|---|---|---|---|---|---|---|
| 1 | Kjeld Nuis | (Netherlands) | 70 | 80 | 100 | 70 | 80 | 80 | 150 | 630 |
| 2 | Pavel Kulizhnikov | (Russia) | 80 | 100 | 0 | 100 | 100 | 100 | 0 | 480 |
| 3 | Gerben Jorritsma | (Netherlands) | 100 | 70 | 28 | 36 | 36 | 36 | 90 | 396 |
| 4 | Kai Verbij | (Netherlands) | 40 | 45 | 70 | 40 | 50 | — | 120 | 365 |
| 5 | Denis Yuskov | (Russia) | — | 25 | 80 | 80 | 70 | — | 104 | 359 |
| 6 | Joey Mantia | (United States) | 60 | 40 | 60 | 45 | 60 | 60 | 21 | 346 |
| 7 | Aleksey Yesin | (Russia) | 45 | 32 | 45 | 50 | 40 | 50 | 36 | 298 |
| 8 | Vincent De Haitre | (Canada) | 36 | 50 | 21 | 28 | 45 | 45 | | 225 |
| 9 | Shani Davis | (United States) | 50 | 60 | 24 | 60 | 21 | — | | 215 |
| 10 | Thomas Krol | (Netherlands) | 18 | 28 | 50 | 32 | — | 70 | | 198 |
| 11 | Alexandre St-Jean | (Canada) | 16 | 21 | 32 | 24 | 32 | 40 | | 165 |
| 12 | Mika Poutala | (Finland) | 25 | 36 | — | 21 | 14 | 24 | | 120 |
| 13 | Kim Tae-Yun | (South Korea) | 0 | 19 | 40 | 16 | 18 | 14 | | 107 |
| 14 | Nico Ihle | (Germany) | 10 | 0 | 0 | 19 | 28 | 28 | | 85 |
| 15 | Kim Jin-su | (South Korea) | 11 | 10 | 36 | 12 | 10 | 5 | | 84 |
| 16 | Denis Kuzin | (Kazakhstan) | 32 | 5 | 14 | 18 | 6 | 8 | | 83 |
| 17 | Jonathan Garcia | (United States) | 0 | 15 | 12 | 25 | 24 | 6 | | 82 |
| 18 | Piotr Michalski | (Poland) | 28 | 6 | 6 | 6 | 8 | 21 | | 75 |
| 19 | Kirill Golubev | (Russia) | 24 | 14 | 18 | 14 | — | — | | 70 |
| 20 | Espen Aarnes Hvammen | (Norway) | 12 | 12 | 16 | — | 12 | 18 | | 70 |
| 21 | Mitchell Whitmore | (United States) | 19 | 24 | — | — | 16 | — | | 59 |
| 22 | Jang Won-hoon | (South Korea) | 6 | 11 | 10 | 0 | 15 | 16 | | 58 |
| 23 | Pim Schipper | (Netherlands) | — | — | — | — | 25 | 32 | | 57 |
| 24 | Mo Tae-bum | (South Korea) | — | — | 15 | 10 | 19 | 12 | | 56 |
| 25 | Roman Krech | (Kazakhstan) | 15 | 16 | 8 | 0 | 5 | — | | 44 |
| 26 | Gilmore Junio | (Canada) | — | 2 | 25 | 8 | — | — | | 35 |
| 27 | Alex Boisvert-Lacroix | (Canada) | 14 | 18 | — | — | — | — | | 32 |
| 28 | Li Bailin | (China) | 21 | 8 | — | — | — | — | | 29 |
| 29 | Richard Maclennan | (Canada) | 8 | — | — | — | 11 | 10 | | 29 |
| 30 | Mikhail Kazelin | (Russia) | — | — | — | — | 0 | 25 | | 25 |
| 31 | Konrad Niedzwiedzki | (Poland) | 0 | 0 | 19 | 5 | — | — | | 24 |
| 32 | Stefan Groothuis | (Netherlands) | 0 | 8 | — | 15 | — | — | | 23 |
| 33 | Yuto Fujino | (Japan) | — | — | — | — | 0 | 19 | | 19 |
| 34 | Takuro Oda | (Japan) | — | — | — | — | — | 15 | | 15 |
| 35 | Yang Fan | (China) | 2 | 0 | 2 | 11 | 0 | 0 | | 15 |
| 36 | Håvard Holmefjord Lorentzen | (Norway) | — | — | — | — | 2 | 11 | | 13 |
| 37 | Taro Kondo | (Japan) | — | 1 | 4 | 8 | 0 | 0 | | 13 |
| 38 | Lennart Velema | (Netherlands) | — | — | 11 | — | — | — | | 11 |
| 39 | Tian Guojun | (China) | 0 | 0 | 8 | 2 | — | — | | 10 |
| 40 | Håvard Bøkko | (Norway) | — | — | — | — | — | 8 | | 8 |
| 41 | Jesper Hospes | (Netherlands) | — | — | — | — | 8 | 0 | | 8 |
| 42 | Joel Dufter | (Germany) | 8 | 0 | 0 | 0 | — | — | | 8 |
| 43 | David Bosa | (Italy) | 0 | 0 | 6 | 0 | 1 | 0 | | 7 |
| 44 | Ruslan Murashov | (Russia) | — | — | — | — | — | 6 | | 6 |
| 45 | Laurent Dubreuil | (Canada) | — | — | — | — | 6 | — | | 6 |
| 46 | Kimani Griffin | (United States) | — | 6 | — | — | 0 | 0 | | 6 |
| 47 | Jan Szymanski | (Poland) | — | 0 | — | 6 | — | — | | 6 |
| 48 | Hubert Hirschbichler | (Germany) | 0 | 4 | 0 | 1 | 0 | 0 | | 5 |
| 49 | Sverre Lunde Pedersen | (Norway) | 0 | — | — | — | — | 4 | | 4 |
| 50 | Mirko Giacomo Nenzi | (Italy) | 0 | 0 | 0 | 0 | 4 | 0 | | 4 |
| 51 | William Dutton | (Canada) | 4 | — | 0 | — | — | — | | 4 |
| 52 | Konrád Nagy | (Hungary) | 0 | 0 | 0 | 4 | — | — | | 4 |
| 53 | Mikhail Kozlov | (Russia) | — | — | — | — | — | 2 | | 2 |
| 54 | Shota Nakamura | (Japan) | — | — | — | — | — | 1 | | 1 |
| 55 | Xie Jia Xuan | (China) | 0 | 0 | 1 | — | 0 | 0 | | 1 |
| 56 | Sindre Henriksen | (Norway) | 1 | — | 0 | — | — | — | | 1 |
