= 2016 World Single Distances Speed Skating Championships – Men's 500 metres =

Men's 500 metres at the 2016 World Single Distances Speed Skating Championships
- Venue: Kolomna Speed Skating Center, Kolomna
- Date: 14 February 2016
- Competitors: 24 from 12 nations
- Winning time: 69.026

Medalists
| gold medal | Pavel Kulizhnikov | Russia |
| silver medal | Ruslan Murashov | Russia |
| bronze medal | Alex Boisvert-Lacroix | Canada |

The Men's 500 metres race of the 2016 World Single Distances Speed Skating Championships was held on 14 February 2016.

== Results ==
The first run started at 14:34 and the second run at 16:19.

| Rank | Name | Country | Pair | Lane | Race 1 | Pair | Lane | Race 2 | Total | Diff |
|---|---|---|---|---|---|---|---|---|---|---|
| 1st place, gold medalist(s) | Pavel Kulizhnikov | RUS | 12 | o | 34.605 | 12 | i | 34.421 | 69.026 | |
| 2nd place, silver medalist(s) | Ruslan Murashov | RUS | 9 | i | 34.600 | 12 | o | 35.080 | 69.680 | +0.654 |
| 3rd place, bronze medalist(s) | Alex Boisvert-Lacroix | CAN | 11 | i | 35.081 | 9 | o | 34.707 | 69.788 | +0.762 |
| 4 | Mika Poutala | FIN | 10 | i | 34.893 | 11 | o | 34.901 | 69.794 | +0.768 |
| 5 | Aleksey Yesin | RUS | 7 | i | 34.911 | 10 | o | 34.894 | 69.805 | +0.779 |
| 6 | Kim Tae-yun | KOR | 5 | o | 34.927 | 11 | i | 34.920 | 69.847 | +0.821 |
| 7 | Artur Waś | POL | 12 | i | 35.081 | 8 | o | 34.864 | 69.945 | +0.919 |
| 8 | William Dutton | CAN | 11 | o | 35.022 | 9 | i | 34.941 | 69.963 | +0.937 |
| 9 | Mitchell Whitmore | USA | 6 | o | 35.053 | 8 | i | 34.965 | 70.018 | +0.992 |
| 10 | Ronald Mulder | NED | 5 | i | 35.092 | 7 | o | 34.971 | 70.063 | +1.037 |
| 11 | Tsubasa Hasegawa | JPN | 3 | i | 35.119 | 5 | o | 35.069 | 70.188 | +1.162 |
| 12 | David Bosa | ITA | 1 | i | 35.162 | 4 | o | 35.041 | 70.203 | +1.177 |
| 13 | Ryohei Haga | JPN | 8 | i | 35.174 | 2 | o | 35.109 | 70.283 | +1.257 |
| 14 | Espen Aarnes Hvammen | NOR | 7 | o | 35.109 | 5 | i | 35.212 | 70.321 | +1.295 |
| 15 | Jan Smeekens | NED | 6 | i | 35.201 | 1 | o | 35.187 | 70.388 | +1.362 |
| 16 | Roman Krech | KAZ | 4 | i | 35.103 | 6 | o | 35.322 | 70.425 | +1.399 |
| 17 | Pekka Koskela | FIN | 2 | i | 35.173 | 3 | o | 35.354 | 70.527 | +1.501 |
| 18 | Piotr Michalski | POL | 1 | o | 35.407 | 4 | i | 35.405 | 70.812 | +1.786 |
| 19 | Gilmore Junio | CAN | 10 | o | 34.956 | 10 | i | 35.859 | 70.815 | +1.789 |
| 20 | Xie Jiaxuan | CHN | 4 | o | 35.569 | 1 | i | 35.286 | 70.855 | +1.829 |
| 21 | Mu Zhongsheng | CHN | 3 | o | 35.443 | 2 | i | 35.468 | 70.911 | +1.885 |
| 22 | Mirko Giacomo Nenzi | ITA | 2 | o | 35.415 | 3 | i | 35.573 | 70.988 | +1.962 |
| 23 | Kai Verbij | NED | 9 | o | 35.100 | 6 | i | 61.259 | 96.359 | +27.333 |
| 24 | Yūya Oikawa | JPN | 8 | o | 35.071 | 7 | i | 84.698 | 119.769 | +50.743 |
