= 2014–15 ISU Speed Skating World Cup – Men's 500 metres =

The 500 meters distance for men in the 2014–15 ISU Speed Skating World Cup was contested over 12 races on six occasions, out of a total of seven World Cup occasions for the season, with the first occasion taking place in Obihiro, Japan, on 14–16 November 2014, and the final occasion taking place in Erfurt, Germany, on 21–22 March 2015.

The defending champion was Ronald Mulder of the Netherlands. Pavel Kulizhnikov of Russia won the cup. Mulder did not participate this season.

== Top three ==
Position	Athlete	Points	Previous season
1	(Russia) Pavel Kulizhnikov	930	–
2	(Canada) Laurent Dubreuil	771	27th
3	(Russia) Ruslan Murashov	565	–

== Race medallists ==
WC #	Location	Date	Gold	Time	Silver	Time	Bronze	Time	Report
1	Obihiro, Japan	14 November	Jan Smeekens; Netherlands	35.06	Pavel Kulizhnikov; Russia	35.16	Ruslan Murashov; Russia	35.24	
1	Obihiro, Japan	16 November	Pavel Kulizhnikov; Russia	34.96	Jan Smeekens; Netherlands	35.09	Ryohei Haga; Japan	35.17	
2	Seoul, South Korea	21 November	Pavel Kulizhnikov; Russia	34.94	Mo Tae-bum; South Korea	35.363	Ruslan Murashov; Russia	35.364	
2	Seoul, South Korea	23 November	Pavel Kulizhnikov; Russia	35.18	Mo Tae-bum; South Korea	35.32	Laurent Dubreuil; Canada	35.35	
3	Berlin, Germany	5 December	Artur Waś; Poland	35.01	Laurent Dubreuil; Canada	35.09	Michel Mulder; Netherlands	35.12	
3	Berlin, Germany	7 December	Artur Waś; Poland	35.04	Espen Aarnes Hvammen; Norway	35.06	Laurent Dubreuil; Canada	35.09	
4	Heerenveen, Netherlands	12 December	Pavel Kulizhnikov; Russia	34.63	Artur Waś; Poland	34.91	Laurent Dubreuil; Canada	35.16	
4	Heerenveen, Netherlands	14 December	Pavel Kulizhnikov; Russia	34.58	Artur Waś; Poland	34.87	Jan Smeekens; Netherlands	35.01	
6	Heerenveen, Netherlands	7 February	Pavel Kulizhnikov; Russia	34.93	Artur Waś; Poland	34.97	Nico Ihle; Germany	35.11	
6	Heerenveen, Netherlands	8 February	Pavel Kulizhnikov; Russia	34.62	Mo Tae-bum; South Korea	34.94	Nico Ihle; Germany	35.06	
7	Erfurt, Germany	21 March	Pavel Kulizhnikov; Russia	34.71	Laurent Dubreuil; Canada	34.94	Gerben Jorritsma; Netherlands	35.25	
7	Erfurt, Germany	22 March	Ruslan Murashov; Russia	34.97	Laurent Dubreuil; Canada; Michel Mulder; Netherlands	35.109 35.109			

== Standings ==
Standings as of 22 March 2015 (end of the season).

#	Name	Nat.	OBI1	OBI2	SEO1	SEO2	BER1	BER2	HVN1	HVN2	HVN3	HVN4	ERF1	ERF2	Total
1	Pavel Kulizhnikov	(Russia)	80	100	100	100			100	100	100	100	150		930
2	Laurent Dubreuil	(Canada)	45	36	40	70	80	70	70	60	45	45	90	120	771
3	Ruslan Murashov	(Russia)	70	60	70	50	10				50	60	45	150	565
4	Michel Mulder	(Netherlands)					70	40	60	40	60	50	120	120	560
5	Nico Ihle	(Germany)	50	24	60	40	50	36		32	70	70	36	90	558
6	Artur Waś	(Poland)					100	100	80	80	80	32	18	36	526
7	Mo Tae-bum	(South Korea)	16	50	80	80	40	50	18	45	36	80			495
8	Jan Smeekens	(Netherlands)	100	80	28	60	16	45	12	70	10		14	40	475
9	Espen Aarnes Hvammen	(Norway)	24	45	50	21	28	80	21	16	24	28	40	76	453
10	Aleksey Yesin	(Russia)	25	21	16	14	21	24		28	21	24	76	32	302
11	Ryohei Haga	(Japan)	40	70	5	8	60	14	45	8	8	10	8	14	290
12	Hein Otterspeer	(Netherlands)	60	10	45	24	18	28	36	28	40				289
13	Gilmore Junio	(Canada)	32	18	32	36	36	16	14	36	14	21			255
14	Denis Koval	(Russia)	36	28	36	12	24	60	40	18					254
15	Gerben Jorritsma	(Netherlands)	18	16	24	18	4	19	8	12			106	28	253
16	Kim Jun-ho	(South Korea)	15	19	18	45	32	32	32	21	6	6			226
17	Pim Schipper	(Netherlands)	8	8	19	25	12	10	25	14	28	18	32	21	220
18	Mika Poutala	(Finland)					15	11	50	50	18	12	16	45	217
19	Keiichiro Nagashima	(Japan)	28	32	6	16	6	18	24	5		25	24	18	202
20	Yūya Oikawa	(Japan)	14	40	12	10	8	8	2	25	12	5	21	24	181
21	Mirko Giacomo Nenzi	(Italy)	12	12	1	19	25	21	28	10		15	10	12	165
22	Artyom Kuznetsov	(Russia)	19	25	8	28	45	12	16						153
23	Mu Zhongsheng	(China)	11	11	14	5	6	15	19		11	4	28	16	140
24	Xie Jiaxuan	(China)	1	1	2	6		25	10	6		19	12	10	92
25	Lee Kang-seok	(South Korea)	8	15	21	6	11			2					63
26	Roman Krech	(Kazakhstan)									16	45			61
27	Artur Nogal	(Poland)	6	6		8	2	1	6	19	5	8			61
28	William Dutton	(Canada)	21	14	10	4				11					60
29	Dai Dai Ntab	(Netherlands)			25	32									57
30	Jamie Gregg	(Canada)									19	36			55
31	Denny Ihle	(Germany)		2	8	15	14	6	1	6					52
32	Tsubasa Hasegawa	(Japan)	2	8	11	4			11	4	8	4			52
33	Jesper Hospes	(Netherlands)									32	16			48
34	Mitchell Whitmore	(United States)					8	2	8	15	15				48
35	Samuel Schwarz	(Germany)			6		19		15		6				46
36	Richard Maclennan	(Canada)	4	4	15	2	1	6		8					40
37	Alex Boisvert-Lacroix	(Canada)									25	14			39
38	Wang Nan	(China)				11		8							19
39	Daichi Yamanaka	(Japan)	10	5											15
40	Pekka Koskela	(Finland)									2	11			13
41	Kai Verbij	(Netherlands)	6	6											12
42	Håvard Holmefjord Lorentzen	(Norway)										8			8
43	David Bosa	(Italy)			4			4							8
43	Piotr Michalski	(Poland)				1				1	4	2			8
45	Tyler Derraugh	(Canada)										6			6
46	Shani Davis	(United States)	5												5
47	Christian Oberbichler	(Austria)							4						4
48	Denis Dressel	(Germany)										1			1
48	Jonathan Garcia	(United States)									1				1
