= 2015 World Single Distance Speed Skating Championships – Men's 500 metres =

Men's 500 metres at the 2015 World Single Distance Speed Skating Championships
- Venue: Thialf, Heerenveen
- Date: 15 February 2015
- Competitors: 24 from 12 nations
- Winning time: 68.931

Medalists
gold medal	Pavel Kulizhnikov	Russia
silver medal	Michel Mulder	Netherlands
bronze medal	Laurent Dubreuil	Canada

The Men's 500 metres race of the 2015 World Single Distance Speed Skating Championships was held on 15 February 2015.

== Results ==
The first run was started at 13:15 and the second run at 15:01.

Rank	Name	Country	Pair	Lane	Race 1	Pair	Lane	Race 2	Total	Diff
1st place, gold medalist(s)	Pavel Kulizhnikov	RUS	11	o	34.383	12	i	34.548	68.931	
2nd place, silver medalist(s)	Michel Mulder	NED	7	o	34.852	11	i	34.770	69.622	+0.691
3rd place, bronze medalist(s)	Laurent Dubreuil	CAN	11	i	34.971	10	o	34.723	69.694	+0.763
4	Hein Otterspeer	NED	7	i	34.742	12	o	35.032	69.774	+0.843
5	Artur Waś	POL	12	i	35.017	9	o	34.790	69.807	+0.876
6	Ruslan Murashov	RUS	10	i	34.964	11	o	35.002	69.966	+1.035
7	Espen Aarnes Hvammen	NOR	10	o	34.979	9	i	35.057	70.036	+1.105
8	Gilmore Junio	CAN	8	o	35.162	8	i	34.985	70.147	+1.216
9	Mo Tae-bum	KOR	12	o	34.905	10	i	35.262	70.167	+1.236
10	Jesper Hospes	NED	1	i	35.248	7	o	35.064	70.312	+1.381
11	Mitchell Whitmore	USA	2	o	35.330	7	i	35.127	70.457	+1.526
12	Aleksey Yesin	RUS	6	i	35.048	8	o	35.481	70.529	+1.598
13	Nico Ihle	GER	9	o	35.343	5	i	35.421	70.764	+1.833
14	Kim Jun-ho	KOR	8	i	35.303	6	o	35.481	70.784	+1.853
15	Ryohei Haga	JPN	9	i	35.478	5	o	35.364	70.842	+1.911
16	Yuya Oikawa	JPN	3	i	35.538	4	o	35.415	70.951	+2.020
17	Mika Poutala	FIN	6	o	35.334	6	i	35.635	70.969	+2.038
18	Mirko Giacomo Nenzi	ITA	5	o	35.648	3	i	35.503	71.151	+2.220
19	Artur Nogal	POL	2	i	35.559	2	o	35.593	71.152	+2.221
20	Mu Zhongsheng	CHN	4	o	35.695	2	i	35.505	71.200	+2.269
21	Samuel Schwarz	GER	3	o	35.805	1	i	35.498	71.303	+2.371
22	Denny Ihle	GER	4	i	35.744	1	o	35.617	71.361	+2.430
23	Xie Jiaxuan	CHN	1	o	35.618	4	i	35.764	71.382	+2.451
24	Keiichiro Nagashima	JPN	5	i	35.551	3	o	36.255	71.806	+2.875
