= 2021 World Single Distances Speed Skating Championships – Men's 500 metres =

Men's 500 metres at the 2021 World Single Distances Speed Skating Championships
- Venue: Thialf
- Location: Heerenveen, Netherlands
- Date: 12 February
- Competitors: 24 from 11 nations
- Winning time: 34.398

Medalists
gold medal	Laurent Dubreuil	Canada
silver medal	Pavel Kulizhnikov
bronze medal	Dai Dai Ntab	Netherlands

The Men's 500 metres competition at the 2021 World Single Distances Speed Skating Championships was held on 12 February of 2021.

== Results ==
The race was started at 16:17.

Rank	Pair	Lane	Name	Country	Time	Diff
1st place, gold medalist(s)	10	o	Laurent Dubreuil	Canada	34.398	
2nd place, silver medalist(s)	11	o	Pavel Kulizhnikov	Russian Skating Union	34.540	+0.15
3rd place, bronze medalist(s)	10	i	Dai Dai Ntab	Netherlands	34.628	+0.23
4	7	i	Kai Verbij	Netherlands	34.678	+0.28
5	11	i	Ronald Mulder	Netherlands	34.698	+0.30
6	8	i	Håvard Holmefjord Lorentzen	Norway	34.773	+0.38
7	12	o	Artem Arefyev	Russian Skating Union	34.817	+0.42
8	7	o	Ignat Golovatsiuk	Belarus	34.868	+0.47
9	5	i	Joel Dufter	Germany	34.931	+0.54
10	4	i	Artur Nogal	Poland	34.961	+0.57
11	12	i	Ruslan Murashov	Russian Skating Union	34.990	+0.60
12	8	o	Alex Boisvert-Lacroix	Canada	35.011	+0.62
13	5	o	Gilmore Junio	Canada	35.038	+0.64
14	4	o	Mirko Giacomo Nenzi	Italy	35.067	+0.67
15	6	o	Marten Liiv	Estonia	35.125	+0.73
16	9	i	Piotr Michalski	Poland	35.159	+0.76
17	9	o	Bjørn Magnussen	Norway	35.235	+0.84
18	6	i	Roman Krech	Kazakhstan	35.382	+0.99
19	3	o	Damian Żurek	Poland	35.421	+1.03
20	1	o	Artiom Chaban	Belarus	35.499	+1.10
21	2	i	Christian Oberbichler	Switzerland	35.573	+1.18
22	3	i	Nico Ihle	Germany	35.610	+1.22
23	1	i	David Bosa	Italy	35.629	+1.23
24	2	o	Odin By Farstad	Norway	35.687	+1.29
