= 2016 World Single Distances Speed Skating Championships – Men's 1000 metres =

Men's 1000 metres at the 2016 World Single Distances Speed Skating Championships
- Venue: Kolomna Speed Skating Center, Kolomna
- Date: 13 February
- Competitors: 24 from 13 nations
- Winning time: 1:08.33

Medalists
gold medal	Pavel Kulizhnikov	Russia
silver medal	Denis Yuskov	Russia
bronze medal	Kjeld Nuis	Netherlands

The Men's 1000 metres race of the 2016 World Single Distances Speed Skating Championships was held on 13 February 2016.

== Results ==
The race was started at 17:40.

Rank	Pair	Lane	Name	Country	Time	Diff
1st place, gold medalist(s)	11	o	Pavel Kulizhnikov	RUS	1:08.33	
2nd place, silver medalist(s)	10	o	Denis Yuskov	RUS	1:08.43	+0.10
3rd place, bronze medalist(s)	12	o	Kjeld Nuis	NED	1:08.47	+0.14
4	9	o	Aleksey Yesin	RUS	1:08.81	+0.48
5	10	i	Shani Davis	USA	1:09.01	+0.68
6	7	o	Alexandre St-Jean	CAN	1:09.12	+0.79
7	11	i	Kai Verbij	NED	1:09.13	+0.80
8	9	i	Vincent De Haître	CAN	1:09.28	+0.95
9	7	i	Kim Tae-yun	KOR	1:09.31	+0.98
10	8	o	Mika Poutala	FIN	1:09.44	+1.11
11	5	i	Mitchell Whitmore	USA	1:09.53	+1.20
12	12	i	Joey Mantia	USA	1:09.58	+1.25
13	8	i	Kim Jin-su	KOR	1:09.64	+1.31
14	3	o	Stefan Groothuis	NED	1:09.71	+1.38
15	1	o	Nico Ihle	GER	1:09.77	+1.44
16	5	o	Roman Krech	KAZ	1:09.98	+1.65
17	6	i	Denis Kuzin	KAZ	1:10.11	+1.78
18	2	o	Taro Kondo	JPN	1:10.17	+1.84
19	4	i	Li Bailin	CHN	1:10.34	+2.01
20	1	i	Håvard Holmefjord Lorentzen	NOR	1:10.39	+2.06
21	3	i	Richard Maclennan	CAN	1:10.70	+2.37
22	6	o	Piotr Michalski	POL	1:10.92	+2.59
23	4	o	Fan Yang	CHN	1:11.56	+3.23
24	2	i	Mathias Vosté	BEL	1:11.72	+3.39
