= 2014–15 ISU Speed Skating World Cup – Men's 1000 metres =

The 1000 meters distance for men in the 2014–15 ISU Speed Skating World Cup was contested over seven races on six occasions, out of a total of seven World Cup occasions for the season, with the first occasion taking place in Obihiro, Japan, on 14–16 November 2014, and the final occasion taking place in Erfurt, Germany, on 21–22 March 2015.

The defending champion was Shani Davis of the United States. Pavel Kulizhnikov of Russia won the cup in his first World Cup season, while Davis had to settle for eighth place.

== Top three ==
Position	Athlete	Points	Previous season
1	(Russia) Pavel Kulizhnikov	600	–
2	(Netherlands) Kjeld Nuis	571	3rd
3	(Germany) Nico Ihle	402	17th

== Race medallists ==
WC #	Location	Date	Gold	Time	Silver	Time	Bronze	Time	Report
1	Obihiro, Japan	15 November	Pavel Kulizhnikov; Russia	1:09.23	Kjeld Nuis; Netherlands	1:09.27	Samuel Schwarz; Germany	1:09.77	
2	Seoul, South Korea	22 November	Pavel Kulizhnikov; Russia	1:09.56	Stefan Groothuis; Netherlands	1:09.83	Kjeld Nuis; Netherlands	1:09.86	
3	Berlin, Germany	6 December	Nico Ihle; Germany	1:09.49	Samuel Schwarz; Germany	1:09.53	Hein Otterspeer; Netherlands	1:09.56	
4	Heerenveen, Netherlands	13 December	Pavel Kulizhnikov; Russia	1:08.77	Kjeld Nuis; Netherlands	1:09.04	Hein Otterspeer; Netherlands	1:09.06	
6	Heerenveen, Netherlands	7 February	Kjeld Nuis; Netherlands	1:08.76	Pavel Kulizhnikov; Russia	1:08.97	Nico Ihle; Germany	1:09.06	
6	Heerenveen, Netherlands	8 February	Kjeld Nuis; Netherlands	1:08.81	Pavel Kulizhnikov; Russia	1:08.82	Stefan Groothuis; Netherlands	1:09.38	
7	Erfurt, Germany	21 March	Denny Morrison; Canada	1:09.07	Kjeld Nuis; Netherlands	1:09.42	Vincent De Haître; Canada	1:09.47	

== Standings ==
Standings as of 21 March 2015 (end of the season).

#	Name	Nat.	OBI	SEO	BER	HVN1	HVN2	HVN3	ERF	Total
1	Pavel Kulizhnikov	(Russia)	100	100	50	100	80	80	90	600
2	Kjeld Nuis	(Netherlands)	80	70	21	80	100	100	120	571
3	Nico Ihle	(Germany)	28	36	100	32	70	60	76	402
4	Stefan Groothuis	(Netherlands)	32	80	45	24	45	70	28	324
5	Denny Morrison	(Canada)	40		36	45	50		150	321
6	Samuel Schwarz	(Germany)	70	45	80	50	36	32		313
7	Hein Otterspeer	(Netherlands)	36	16	70	70	60			252
8	Shani Davis	(United States)	50	50	24	36	40	50		250
9	Vincent De Haître	(Canada)	60	6	14	18	14	28	106	246
10	Aleksey Yesin	(Russia)	12	24	60	60	12	36	32	236
11	Håvard Holmefjord Lorentzen	(Norway)	16	12	40	12	21	24	45	170
12	Pim Schipper	(Netherlands)				25	28	45	40	138
13	Kai Verbij	(Netherlands)	21	60	28	21				130
14	Yang Fan	(China)	25	32	8	10	10	16	24	125
15	Denis Kuzin	(Kazakhstan)	24	8		40	32			104
16	Koen Verweij	(Netherlands)	45	40	18					103
17	Michel Mulder	(Netherlands)					24	40	36	100
18	Richard Maclennan	(Canada)	15	28	10	16	8	21		98
19	Konrad Niedźwiedzki	(Poland)	18	21	32	14				85
20	Kirill Golubev	(Russia)	14	14	16	6	6	14		70
21	Jonathan Garcia	(United States)			25	28	16			69
22	Mo Tae-bum	(South Korea)		19	12	19	18			68
23	Piotr Michalski	(Poland)			19	5	19	12		55
24	Tyler Derraugh	(Canada)		11		11	15	18		55
25	Joey Mantia	(United States)			15	8	25			48
26	Denis Dressel	(Germany)	1	8	2	15	5	10		41
27	Kim Jin-su	(South Korea)		25	6	8				39
28	Mirko Giacomo Nenzi	(Italy)	8	1	8		1	19		37
29	Haralds Silovs	(Latvia)				6		25		31
30	Zbigniew Bródka	(Poland)	10	15			6			31
31	Ha Hong-sun	(South Korea)	8	18						26
32	Mika Poutala	(Finland)			11	4		8		23
33	Li Bailin	(China)	11	10						21
34	Sverre Lunde Pedersen	(Norway)	19							19
35	Bart Swings	(Belgium)						15		15
36	Espen Aarnes Hvammen	(Norway)					11			11
36	Pekka Koskela	(Finland)						11		11
38	Benjamin Macé	(France)	6		4	1				11
39	Roman Krech	(Kazakhstan)					8			8
40	David Bosa	(Italy)			6					6
40	Armin Hager	(Austria)		6						6
40	Mu Zhongsheng	(China)						6		6
40	Takuro Oda	(Japan)	6							6
40	Jeffrey Swider-Peltz	(United States)	6							6
45	Shunsuke Nakamura	(Japan)		4						4
45	Alexandre St-Jean	(Canada)						4		4
45	Jan Szymański	(Poland)					4			4
48	Jamie Gregg	(Canada)					2	1		3
49	Mikhail Kozlov	(Russia)		2						2
49	Fyodor Mezentsev	(Kazakhstan)	2							2
49	Wang Nan	(China)						2		2
49	Mitchell Whitmore	(United States)				2				2
53	Christopher Fagerli Rukke	(Norway)			1					1
