= 2017 World Single Distances Speed Skating Championships – Men's 500 metres =

Men's 500 metres at the 2017 World Single Distances Speed Skating Championships
- Venue: Gangneung Oval
- Location: Gangneung, South Korea
- Dates: 10 February
- Competitors: 24 from 14 nations
- Winning time: 34.58

Medalists
gold medal	Jan Smeekens	Netherlands
silver medal	Nico Ihle	Germany
bronze medal	Ruslan Murashov	Russia

The Men's 500 metres competition at the 2017 World Single Distances Speed Skating Championships was held on 10 February 2017.

== Results ==
The race was started at 18:00.

Rank	Pair	Lane	Name	Country	Time	Diff
1st place, gold medalist(s)	8	o	Jan Smeekens	Netherlands	34.58	
2nd place, silver medalist(s)	6	i	Nico Ihle	Germany	34.66	+0.08
3rd place, bronze medalist(s)	12	o	Ruslan Murashov	Russia	34.76	+0.18
4	10	o	Mitchell Whitmore	United States	34.80	+0.22
5	5	i	Ronald Mulder	Netherlands	34.85	+0.27
6	8	i	Tsubasa Hasegawa	Japan	34.87	+0.29
7	6	o	Håvard Holmefjord Lorentzen	Norway	34.88	+0.30
8	3	o	Joji Kato	Japan	34.91	+0.33
9	9	i	Laurent Dubreuil	Canada	34.94	+0.36
10	12	i	Gao Tingyu	China	34.97	+0.39
11	3	i	Yuma Murakami	Japan	34.99	+0.41
12	9	o	Cha Min-kyu	South Korea	35.01	+0.43
13	5	o	Alex Boisvert-Lacroix	Canada	35.02	+0.44
14	7	o	Artur Waś	Poland	35.03	+0.45
15	1	o	William Dutton	Canada	35.07	+0.49
16	7	i	Roman Krech	Kazakhstan	35.14	+0.56
17	4	i	Artyom Kuznetsov	Russia	35.15	+0.57
18	11	o	Mika Poutala	Finland	35.17	+0.59
19	1	i	Alexey Yesin	Russia	35.18	+0.60
20	11	i	Kim Tae-yun	South Korea	35.29	+0.71
21	2	o	David Bosa	Italy	35.44	+0.86
22	4	o	Kim Jun-ho	South Korea	35.45	+0.87
23	2	i	Daniel Greig	Australia	36.09	+1.51
—	10	i	Dai Dai Ntab	Netherlands	DSQ	
