= 2018 European Speed Skating Championships – Men's team sprint =

Men's team sprint at the 2018 European Speed Skating Championships
- Venue: Kolomna Speed Skating Center
- Location: Kolomna, Russia
- Dates: 7 January
- Competitors: 18 from 6 nations
- Teams: 6
- Winning time: 1:19.38

Medalists
gold medal	Ruslan Murashov; Pavel Kulizhnikov; Denis Yuskov	Russia
silver medal	Harri Levo; Pekka Koskela; Mika Poutala	Finland
bronze medal	Artur Nogal; Piotr Michalski; Sebastian Klosinski	Poland

The men's team sprint competition at the 2018 European Speed Skating Championships was held on 7 January 2018.

== Results ==
The race was started at 17:10.

Rank	Pair	Lane	Country	Time	Diff
1st place, gold medalist(s)	3	c	Russia; Ruslan Murashov; Pavel Kulizhnikov; Denis Yuskov	1:19.38	
2nd place, silver medalist(s)	2	s	Finland; Harri Levo; Pekka Koskela; Mika Poutala	1:21.19	+1.81
3rd place, bronze medalist(s)	3	s	Poland; Artur Nogal; Piotr Michalski; Sebastian Klosinski	1:21.29	+1.91
4	2	c	Norway; Bjørn Magnussen; Henrik Fagerli Rukke; Johann Jørgen Sæves	1:22.08	+2.70
	1	c	Belarus; Eugeny Bolgov; Artiom Chaban; Vitaly Mikhailov	Did not finish	
	1	s	Netherlands; Michel Mulder; Hein Otterspeer; Koen Verweij	Disqualified	
