= 2020 World Single Distances Speed Skating Championships – Men's 500 metres =

Men's 500 metres at the 2020 World Single Distances Speed Skating Championships
- Venue: Utah Olympic Oval
- Location: Salt Lake City, United States
- Dates: February 14
- Competitors: 24 from 11 nations
- Winning time: 33.72

Medalists
gold medal	Pavel Kulizhnikov	Russia
silver medal	Ruslan Murashov	Russia
bronze medal	Tatsuya Shinhama	Japan

The Men's 500 metres competition at the 2020 World Single Distances Speed Skating Championships was held on February 14, 2020.

== Results ==
The race started at 16:35.

Rank	Pair	Lane	Name	Country	Time	Diff
1st place, gold medalist(s)	5	i	Pavel Kulizhnikov	Russia	33.72	
2nd place, silver medalist(s)	11	o	Ruslan Murashov	Russia	33.99	+0.27
3rd place, bronze medalist(s)	10	o	Tatsuya Shinhama	Japan	34.03	+0.31
4	11	i	Viktor Mushtakov	Russia	34.05	+0.33
5	4	i	Daichi Yamanaka	Japan	34.06	+0.34
6	9	o	Laurent Dubreuil	Canada	34.12	+0.40
7	4	o	Cha Min-kyu	South Korea	34.21	+0.49
8	12	i	Kim Jun-ho	South Korea	34.26	+0.54
9	10	i	Gao Tingyu	China	34.28	+0.56
10	7	o	Kai Verbij	Netherlands	34.32	+0.60
11	9	i	Gilmore Junio	Canada	34.44	+0.72
12	2	o	Jan Smeekens	Netherlands	34.45	+0.73
13	8	o	Dai Dai Ntab	Netherlands	34.48	+0.76
14	12	o	Yuma Murakami	Japan	34.52	+0.80
15	5	o	Håvard Holmefjord Lorentzen	Norway	34.53	+0.81
16	6	o	Artur Nogal	Poland	34.56	+0.84
17	8	i	Alex Boisvert-Lacroix	Canada	34.60	+0.88
18	3	o	Nico Ihle	Germany	34.65	+0.93
19	3	i	Ignat Golovatsiuk	Belarus	34.69	+0.97
20	6	i	Kim Tae-yun	South Korea	34.70	+0.98
21	7	i	Piotr Michalski	Poland	35.00	+1.28
22	1	i	Alexander Klenko	Kazakhstan	44.50	+10.78
	2	i	Artiom Chaban	Belarus	Did not finish	
	1	o	Hendrik Dombek	Germany	Disqualified	
