= 2018 European Speed Skating Championships – Men's 500 metres =

Men's 500 metres at the 2018 European Speed Skating Championships
- Venue: Kolomna Speed Skating Center
- Location: Kolomna, Russia
- Dates: 5 January
- Competitors: 19 from 9 nations
- Winning time: 34.80

Medalists
| gold medal | Ronald Mulder | Netherlands |
| silver medal | Mika Poutala | Finland |
| bronze medal | Pavel Kulizhnikov | Russia |

The men's 500 metres competition at the 2018 European Speed Skating Championships was held on 5 January 2018.

== Results ==
The race was started at 16:29.

| Rank | Pair | Lane | Name | Country | Time | Diff |
|---|---|---|---|---|---|---|
| 1st place, gold medalist(s) | 8 | o | Ronald Mulder | Netherlands | 34.80 | |
| 2nd place, silver medalist(s) | 10 | o | Mika Poutala | Finland | 34.854 | +0.05 |
| 3rd place, bronze medalist(s) | 9 | o | Pavel Kulizhnikov | Russia | 34.858 | +0.05 |
| 4 | 10 | i | Nico Ihle | Germany | 35.03 | +0.23 |
| 5 | 9 | i | Artyom Kuznetsov | Russia | 35.06 | +0.26 |
| 6 | 7 | o | Pekka Koskela | Finland | 35.19 | +0.39 |
| 7 | 6 | o | Michel Mulder | Netherlands | 35.23 | +0.43 |
| 8 | 7 | i | Artur Nogal | Poland | 35.24 | +0.44 |
| 9 | 8 | i | Ruslan Murashov | Russia | 35.28 | +0.48 |
| 10 | 5 | o | Henrik Fagerli Rukke | Norway | 35.38 | +0.58 |
| 11 | 5 | i | Piotr Michalski | Poland | 35.51 | +0.71 |
| 12 | 4 | o | Mathias Vosté | Belgium | 35.67 | +0.87 |
| 13 | 4 | i | Joel Dufter | Germany | 35.71 | +0.91 |
| 14 | 6 | i | Sebastian Kłosiński | Poland | 35.841 | +1.04 |
| 15 | 3 | o | Bjørn Magnussen | Norway | 35.844 | +1.04 |
| 16 | 3 | i | Harri Levo | Finland | 35.89 | +1.09 |
| 17 | 2 | o | Johann Jørgen Sæves | Norway | 35.93 | +1.13 |
| 18 | 2 | i | Marten Liiv | Estonia | 36.29 | +1.49 |
| 19 | 1 | o | Artiom Chaban | Belarus | 36.55 | +1.75 |
