= 2013 World Single Distance Speed Skating Championships – Men's 1000 metres =

Men's 1000 metres at the 2013 World Single Distance Speed Skating Championships
- Venue: Adler Arena, Sochi
- Date: 22 March 2013
- Competitors: 24 from 14 nations
- Winning time: 1:09.14

Medalists
gold medal	Denis Kuzin	Kazakhstan
silver medal	Mo Tae-bum	South Korea
bronze medal	Shani Davis	United States

The men's 1000 metres race of the 2013 World Single Distance Speed Skating Championships was held on 22 March at 15:00 local time.

== Results ==
Rank	Pair	Lane	Name	Country	Time	Time behind	Notes
1st place, gold medalist(s)	9	i	Denis Kuzin	Kazakhstan	1:09.14		
2nd place, silver medalist(s)	7	i	Mo Tae-bum	South Korea	1:09.24	+0.10	
3rd place, bronze medalist(s)	12	i	Shani Davis	United States	1:09.30	+0.16	
4	12	o	Kjeld Nuis	Netherlands	1:09.42	+0.28	
5	6	o	Zbigniew Bródka	Poland	1:09.45	+0.31	
6	3	o	Mirko Giacomo Nenzi	Italy	1:09.72	+0.58	
6	11	i	Samuel Schwarz	Germany	1:09.72	+0.58	
8	9	o	Stefan Groothuis	Netherlands	1:09.83	+0.69	
9	7	o	Brian Hansen	United States	1:09.91	+0.77	
10	5	o	Haralds Silovs	Latvia	1:10.19	+1.05	
11	4	o	Dmitry Lobkov	Russia	1:10.31	+1.17	
12	10	o	Aleksey Yesin	Russia	1:10.42	+1.28	
13	11	o	Denny Morrison	Canada	1:10.45	+1.31	
14	6	i	Jamie Gregg	Canada	1:10.47	+1.33	
15	8	o	Nico Ihle	Germany	1:10.62	+1.48	
16	4	i	Daniel Greig	Australia	1:10.69	+1.55	
17	1	o	Yevgeny Lalenkov	Russia	1:10.72	+1.58	
18	10	i	Tyler Derraugh	Canada	1:11.14	+2.00	
19	5	i	Benjamin Macé	France	1:11.18	+2.04	
20	2	o	Espen Aarnes Hvammen	Norway	1:11.42	+2.28	
21	1	i	Christoffer Fagerli Rukke	Norway	1:11.70	+2.56	
22	3	i	Mitchell Whitmore	United States	1:12.70	+3.56	
23	2	i	Tommi Pulli	Finland	1:12.81	+3.67	
	8	i	Mark Tuitert	Netherlands	DNF		
