= 2018 European Speed Skating Championships – Men's 1000 metres =

Men's 1000 metres at the 2018 European Speed Skating Championships
- Venue: Kolomna Speed Skating Center
- Location: Kolomna, Russia
- Dates: 6 January
- Competitors: 21 from 11 nations
- Winning time: 1:08.84

Medalists
gold medal	Pavel Kulizhnikov	Russia
silver medal	Denis Yuskov	Russia
bronze medal	Nico Ihle	Germany

The men's 1000 metres competition at the 2018 European Speed Skating Championships was held on 6 January 2018.

== Results ==
The race was started at 15:21.

Rank	Pair	Lane	Name	Country	Time	Diff
1st place, gold medalist(s)	9	i	Pavel Kulizhnikov	Russia	1:08.84	
2nd place, silver medalist(s)	10	i	Denis Yuskov	Russia	1:08.92	+0.08
3rd place, bronze medalist(s)	6	i	Nico Ihle	Germany	1:08.95	+0.11
4	10	o	Thomas Krol	Netherlands	1:09.28	+0.44
5	9	o	Mika Poutala	Finland	1:09.41	+0.57
6	6	o	Aleksey Yesin	Russia	1:09.72	+0.88
7	11	i	Koen Verweij	Netherlands	1:09.87	+1.03
8	11	o	Hein Otterspeer	Netherlands	1:09.91	+1.07
9	7	o	Sebastian Kłosiński	Poland	1:10.04	+1.20
10	7	i	Haralds Silovs	Latvia	1:10.22	+1.38
11	4	i	Mathias Vosté	Belgium	1:10.33	+1.49
12	8	o	Piotr Michalski	Poland	1:10.45	+1.61
13	3	o	Joel Dufter	Germany	1:10.51	+1.67
14	5	o	Henrik Fagerli Rukke	Norway	1:10.72	+1.88
15	3	i	Zbigniew Bródka	Poland	1:11.14	+2.30
16	8	i	Marten Liiv	Estonia	1:11.15	+2.31
17	2	i	Johann Jørgen Sæves	Norway	1:11.42	+2.58
18	5	i	David Andersson	Sweden	1:11.47	+2.63
19	4	o	Samuli Suomalainen	Finland	1:11.75	+2.91
20	1	o	Runar Njåtun Krøyer	Norway	1:12.61	+3.77
21	2	o	Oliver Grob	Switzerland	1:14.98	+6.14
