= 2015 World Sprint Speed Skating Championships =

International speed skating competition

- Venue: Alau Ice Palace, Astana, Kazakhstan
- Dates: 28 February – 1 March 2015
- Competitors: 59 from 16 nations

Medalist men
1st place, gold medalist(s)		Pavel Kulizhnikov	RUS
2nd place, silver medalist(s)		Hein Otterspeer	NED
3rd place, bronze medalist(s)		Aleksey Yesin	RUS

Medalist women
1st place, gold medalist(s)		Brittany Bowe	USA
2nd place, silver medalist(s)		Heather Richardson	USA
3rd place, bronze medalist(s)		Karolína Erbanová	CZE

The 2015 World Sprint Speed Skating Championships were held in Astana, Kazakhstan, from 28 February to 1 March 2015.

== Schedule ==
The schedule of events:

Date	Time	Event
Saturday, 28 February 2015	17:30	500 m women
Saturday, 28 February 2015	17:30	500 m men
Saturday, 28 February 2015	17:30	1000 m women
Saturday, 28 February 2015	17:30	1000 m men
Sunday, 1 March 2015	18:30	500 m women
Sunday, 1 March 2015	18:30	500 m men
Sunday, 1 March 2015	18:30	1000 m women
Sunday, 1 March 2015	18:30	1000 m men

All times are local (UTC+6).

== Participating nations ==
59 speed skaters from 16 nations participated. The number of speed skaters per nation that competed is shown in parentheses.

Participating nations
- Austria (1)
- Belarus (2)
- Canada (6)
- China (5)
- Czech Republic (1)
- Finland (3)
- Germany (3)
- Italy (3)
- Japan (5)
- Kazakhstan (4)
- Netherlands (6)
- Norway (3)
- Poland (2)
- Russia (6)
- South Korea (3)
- United States (6)

== Medal summary ==
=== Medal table ===
Rank	Nation	Gold	Silver	Bronze	Total
1	United States (USA)	1	1	0	2
2	Russia (RUS)	1	0	1	2
3	Netherlands (NED)	0	1	0	1
4	Czech Republic (CZE)	0	0	1	1
Totals (4 entries)		2	2	2	6

=== Medalists ===
Event	Gold		Silver		Bronze	
Men	Pavel Kulizhnikov; RUS	138.325	Hein Otterspeer; NED	139.335	Aleksey Yesin; RUS	139.855
Women	Brittany Bowe; USA	149.600	Heather Richardson; USA	150.815	Karolína Erbanová; CZE	152.625
