= 2016 World Sprint Speed Skating Championships =

International speed skating competition

- Location: Seoul, South Korea
- Venue: Taereung International Rink
- Dates: 27–28 February
- Competitors: 60 from 17 nations

Medalist men
1st place, gold medalist(s)		Pavel Kulizhnikov	RUS
2nd place, silver medalist(s)		Kjeld Nuis	NED
3rd place, bronze medalist(s)		Kai Verbij	NED

Medalist women
1st place, gold medalist(s)		Brittany Bowe	USA
2nd place, silver medalist(s)		Heather Richardson-Bergsma	USA
3rd place, bronze medalist(s)		Jorien ter Mors	NED

The 2016 World Sprint Speed Skating Championships was held in Seoul, South Korea, from 27 to 28 February 2016.

== Schedule ==
Date	Event
27 February 2016	500 m women
27 February 2016	500 m men
27 February 2016	1000 m women
27 February 2016	1000 m men
28 February 2016	500 m women
28 February 2016	500 m men
28 February 2016	1000 m women
28 February 2016	1000 m men

All times are local (UTC+9).

== Medal summary ==
=== Medal table ===
Rank	Nation	Gold	Silver	Bronze	Total
1	United States (USA)	1	1	0	2
2	Russia (RUS)	1	0	0	1
3	Netherlands (NED)	0	1	2	3
Totals (3 entries)		2	2	2	6

=== Medalists ===
Event	Gold		Silver		Bronze	
Men	Pavel Kulizhnikov; RUS	139.245	Kjeld Nuis; NED	139.995	Kai Verbij; NED	140.420
Women	Brittany Bowe; USA	151.595	Heather Richardson-Bergsma; USA	151.945	Jorien ter Mors; NED	152.340

== Participating nations ==
60 speed skaters from 17 nations participated. The number of speed skaters per nation that competed is shown in parentheses.

- Austria (1)
- Australia (1)
- Belarus (2)
- Canada (3)
- China (6)
- Czech Republic (1)
- Finland (2)
- Germany (2)
- Italy (3)
- Japan (5)
- Kazakhstan (3)
- Netherlands (6)
- Norway (6)
- Poland (2)
- Russia (6)
- South Korea (5)
- United States (6)
