= Pavel Kulizhnikov =

Russian speed skater

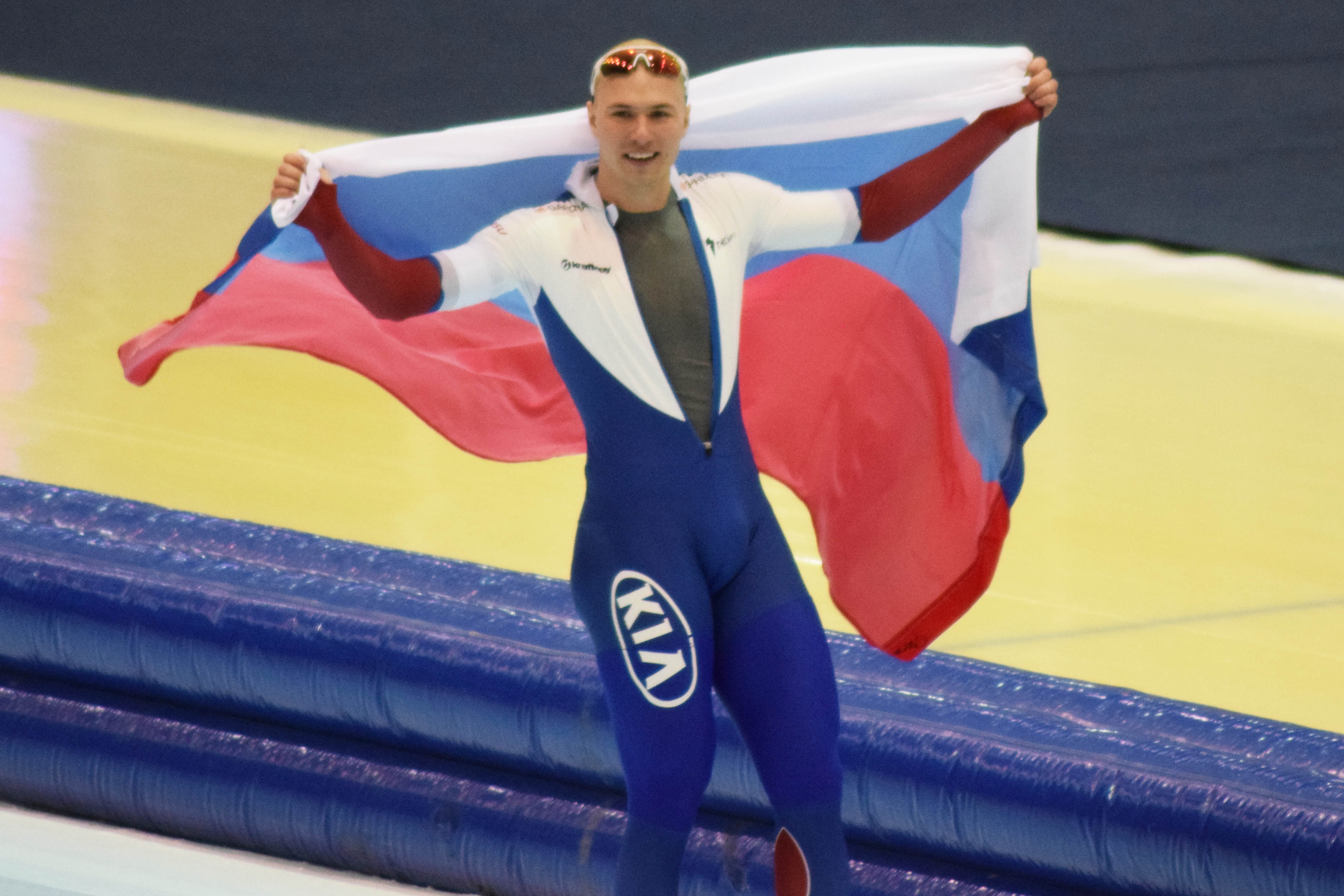
- Kulizhnikov in 2016

Personal information
- Full name: Pavel Aleksandrovich Kulizhnikov
- Nationality: (Russia) Russian
- Born: 20 April 1994 (age 32) Vorkuta, Komi Republic, Russia
- Height: 1.85 m (6 ft 1 in)
- Weight: 94 kg (207 lb)

Sport
- Country: Russia
- Sport: Speed skating
- Events: 500 m, 1000 m, team sprint
- Club: Central Sports Army Club
- Turned pro: 14 November 2014
- Coached by: Dmitry Dorofeyev
Medal record
Men's speed skating
Representing Russia
World Sprint Championships
Gold medal – first place	2015 Astana	Sprint
Gold medal – first place	2016 Seoul	Sprint
Gold medal – first place	2019 Heerenveen	Sprint
World Single Distance Championships
Gold medal – first place	2015 Heerenveen	500 m
Gold medal – first place	2016 Kolomna	500 m
Gold medal – first place	2016 Kolomna	1000 m
Gold medal – first place	2020 Salt Lake City	500 m
Gold medal – first place	2020 Salt Lake City	1000 m
Silver medal – second place	2015 Heerenveen	1000 m
Bronze medal – third place	2019 Inzell	Team sprint
European Championships
Gold medal – first place	2018 Kolomna	1000 m
Gold medal – first place	2018 Kolomna	Team sprint
Gold medal – first place	2020 Heerenveen	500 m
Gold medal – first place	2020 Heerenveen	1000 m
Gold medal – first place	2020 Heerenveen	Team sprint
Bronze medal – third place	2018 Kolomna	500 m
World Junior Championships
Disqualified	2012 Obihiro	500 m
Disqualified	2012 Obihiro	1000 m
Representing Russian Skating Union
World Single Distance Championships
Silver medal – second place	2021 Heerenveen	500 m
Silver medal – second place	2021 Heerenveen	1000 m

Pavel Aleksandrovich Kulizhnikov (Russian: Павел Александрович Кулижников; born 20 April 1994) is a Russian speed skater. He won the men's 500 metres event at the 2015 World Single Distance Championships as well as the 2015 World Sprint Championships, becoming the youngest winner since speed skating icon Eric Heiden of the United States. In 2015, he became the first speed skater to finish the 500-meter in under 34 seconds with a world record of 33.98. In 2020 he became the first speed skater to break 1:06 in the 1000 metres. At the 2016 World Single Distance Championships, Kulizhnikov won the men's 500 m and 1000 m, becoming the first man to win gold in both distances at the same speed skating World Single Distances Championships.

== Career ==
=== Junior ===
Kulizhnikov was a talented junior and prodigy, winning numerous of the Junior World Cup in the 2010–2011 and 2011–2012 seasons. At the 2012 World Junior Championships in Obihiro, Japan, then 17-year-old Kulizhnikov won gold in the 1000 meters and bronze in the 500 meters, but was later disqualified for a doping violation, with his results annulled, and suspended for two years ending his quest to compete at the 2014 Sochi Olympics. Kulizhnikov stated that methylhexanamine was found in his body because of a nasal spray for colds.

=== Senior ===
==== 2014–15 ====
After a two-year doping suspension, Kulizhnikov debuted in his first World Cup series in 2014–2015; he started his competition in Obihiro by taking gold in 1000 meters and silver in 500 meters. He won a total of 3 gold at the 2014–15 World Cup men's 1000 meters and 8 gold in 2014–15 World Cup men's 500 metres. He won gold at the 2015 World Single Distance Championships in 500 meters, as well as the 2015 World Sprint Championships, 18 years later since the last Russian Sergey Klevchenya won Sprint. He is also the youngest speed skater to win since speed skating Icon Eric Heiden of the United States. Kulizhnikov withdrew from the last leg of the World Cup series of the season nursing a back injury, his teammate Ruslan Murashov won the final event of the series in 500 meters in Erfurt, Germany. Kulizhnikov took 1st place in the overall ranking in the men's speed skating for 500 m and 1000 m in the 2014–15 World Cup Series. He underwent back treatment in the first half of the season.

==== 2015–16 ====
For the 2015–16 season, Kulizhnikov competed at the 2015–16 ISU Speed Skating World Cup in Calgary, winning the 500 m with a new Russian record of 34.11. He then won silver in 1000 m, updating his record to 1:07.33. On 15 November 2015, Kulizhnikov broke the world record in men's 500 m, clocking a time of 34.00 seconds to beat the previous record of 34.03 set by Jeremy Wotherspoon of Canada in 2007. Five days later at the second World Cup meet in Salt Lake City on 20 November 2015, he improved his world record to 33.98. He then won the men's 1000 m with an updated personal best of 1:06.70. Kuliznikov withdrew from the list in competition at the 2015–16 ISU World Cup in Inzell because of the flu.

He returned to competition at the 2015–16 World Cup in Heerenveen, where he won gold medals in 500 m and 1000 m in a time of 1:08.16 (a track record, and a lowland world record). On the third day of competition in 500 m race, Kulizhnikov unexpectedly fell in the inner corner in his mid-race and finished 20th, teammate Ruslan Murashov won the event. Kulizhnikov was unharmed from the fall and did not suffer any major injuries. In 29–31 January, Kulizhnikov competed at the ISU World Cup in Stavanger winning the gold medals in 500 m and in 1000 m, where he updated his new Lowland world record time of 1:08.10. On 11–14 February, at the 2016 World Single Distance Speed Skating Championships in Kolomna, Kulizhnikov won two gold medals, winning the men's 500 m and 1000 m, becoming the first man to win gold in both distances at the same speed skating World Single Distances Championships. In 26–28 February, Kulizhnikov retained his Sprint title winning the 2016 World Sprint Speed Skating Championships held in Seoul, South Korea.

===== Meldonium case =====
On 8 March 2016, it was reported that Kulizhnikov had failed a drug test, testing positive for meldonium, an anti-ischemic drug added to the World Anti-Doping Agency (WADA)'s banned substances list in 2016. On 13 April, the World Anti-Doping Agency gave amnesty to athletes with the presence of less than one microgram of meldonium in blood. Doping samples in tests conducted on athletes before 1 March 2016 with abnormal levels of the drug are acceptable, WADA cited due to uncertainties and lack of studies for how long meldoniumnstays in the body. On 21 April 2016, the International Skating Union lifted its temporary ban on Kulizhnikov, and he was reinstated in the team since the concentration of meldonium was below the threshold.

The International Skating Union's Official Statement was quoted: "In the case of Meldonium, the WADA recognized that there is currently a lack of clear scientific information on excretion time and considers that in certain circumstances there may be grounds for no fault or negligence on the part of the athlete. All mentioned skaters credibly assured the ISU that they had discontinued the use of Meldonium before 1 January 2016, when the substance was included in the prohibited list. In light of the given information, the ISU has decided to lift the provisional suspension imposed on the four skaters, with immediate effect, to stay the results management process and consequently not to disqualify any results at the present stage."

==== 2019–20 ====
In the 2019–20 World Cup season, Kulizhnikov missed out on the first two stages due to an injury received during practice. He then skipped the following stage in Nur-Sultan. He returned to the ice rink in Nagano, collecting four medals, two of which were gold ones: in the 1000 m and, for the first time, in the team sprint. In the 1000 m event, he set a track record. In the following Calgary stage, he set another track record in the same event.

Kulizhnikov entered the 2020 World Single Distances Championships, taking place at Utah Olympic Oval in Salt Lake City. During the team sprint event, Kulizhnikov tumbled, so his team did not finish the run. The fall resulted in Kulizhnikov having his shoulders dislocated. However, the Russian took part in the 500 m distance and achieved victory. After the 500 m, he planned to skip the 1000 m event. Despite that, Kulizhnikov was persuaded not to do that; as a result, he finished the 1000 m event with a new world record (1:05.69). Kulizhnikov held the world record for just under four years before Jordan Stolz lowered it on 26 January 2024, also in Salt Lake City.

=== Personal records ===
Personal records
Men's speed skating
Event	Result	Date	Location	Notes
500 m	33.61	9 March 2019	Utah Olympic Oval, Salt Lake City	Current world record.
1000 m	1:05.69	15 February 2020	Utah Olympic Oval, Salt Lake City	World record until beaten by Jordan Stolz on 26 January 2024.
1500 m	1:47.26	22 January 2015	Kolomna Speed Skating Center, Kolomna	
3000 m	3:56.26	11 December 2011	Speed Skating Centre, Kolomna	
5000 m	7:04.65	4 February 2012	Speed Skating Centre, Kolomna	

=== World records ===
World records
Men's speed skating
Event	Result	Date	Location	Notes
500 m	34.00	15 November 2015	Olympic Oval, Calgary	World record until beaten by himself on 20 November 2015.
500 m	33.98	20 November 2015	Utah Olympic Oval, Salt Lake City	World record until beaten by himself on 9 March 2019.
500 m	33.61	9 March 2019	Utah Olympic Oval, Salt Lake City	Current world record.
1000 m	1:08.10	30 January 2016	Sørmarka Arena, Stavanger	Former lowland world record.
1000 m	1:05.69	15 February 2020	Utah Olympic Oval, Salt Lake City	World record until beaten by Jordan Stolz on 26 January 2024.

=== Achievements ===
- Second-youngest world champion since Eric Heiden of the United States.
- First male speed skater to win 500m and 1000m gold at the same speed skating World Single Distances Championships.

== Tournament overview ==
Season	European Championships Single Distances	World Championships Sprint	World Championships Single Distances	World Cup GWC
2014–15		ASTANA (gold) 500m (silver) 1000m (gold) 500m (gold) 1000m (gold) overall	HEERENVEEN (gold) 500m (silver) 1000m	(gold) 500m (gold) 1000m
2015–16		SEOUL (gold) 500m (silver) 1000m (gold) 500m (silver) 1000m (gold) overall	KOLOMNA (gold) 500m (gold) 1000m	(gold) 500m (silver) 1000m
2016–17				
2017–18	KOLOMNA (bronze) 500m (gold) 1000m (gold) Team sprint			(gold) 500m (bronze) 1000m

== World Cup results ==
=== Podiums ===
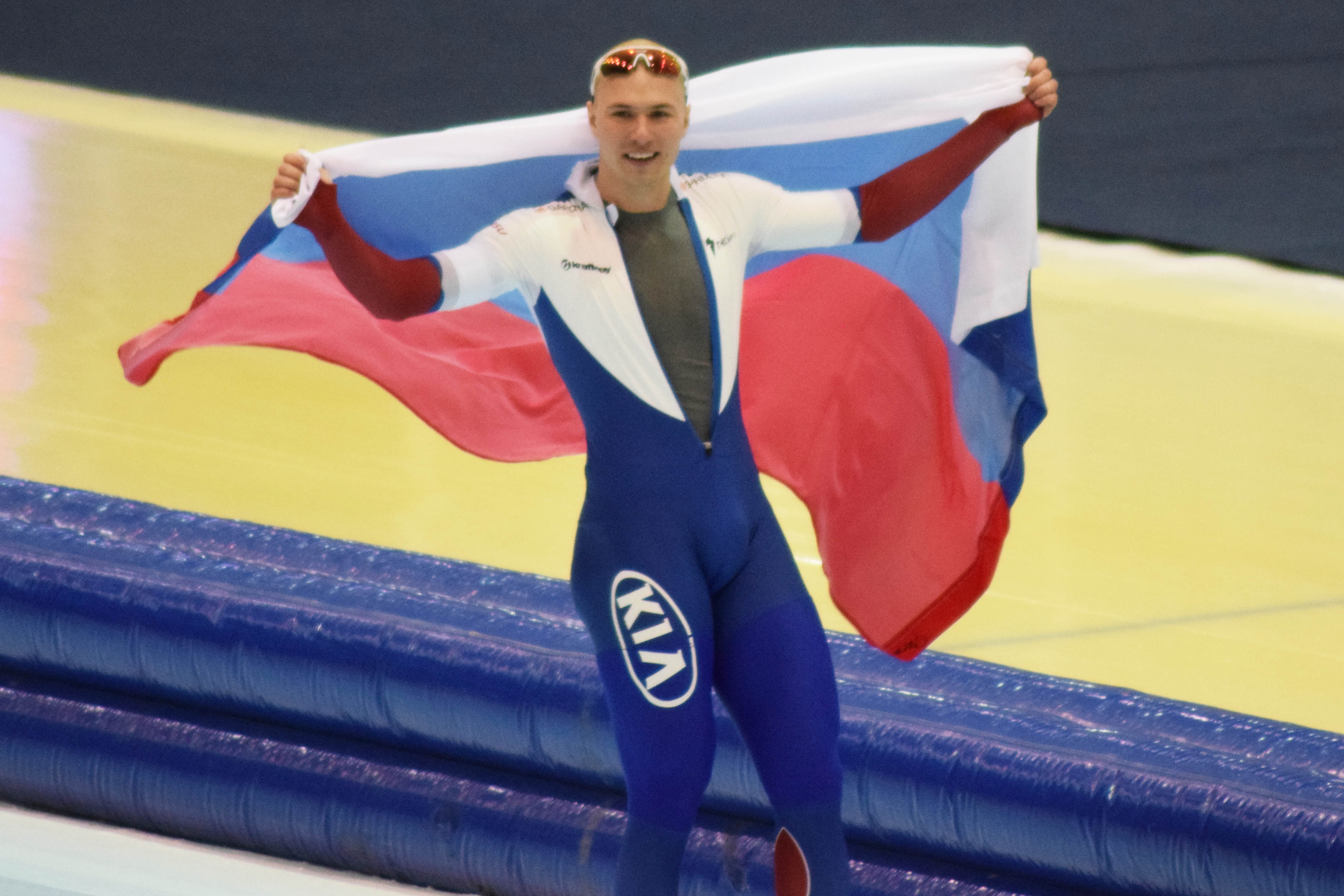
Kulizhnikov at the 2016 World Single Distance Speed Skating Championships

Date	Season	Location	Rank	Event
14 November 2014	2014–15	Obihiro	2nd place, silver medalist(s)	500m
15 November 2014	2014–15	Obihiro	1st place, gold medalist(s)	1000m
16 November 2014	2014–15	Obihiro	1st place, gold medalist(s)	500m
21 November 2014	2014–15	Seoul	1st place, gold medalist(s)	500m
22 November 2014	2014–15	Seoul	1st place, gold medalist(s)	1000m
23 November 2014	2014–15	Seoul	1st place, gold medalist(s)	500m
12 December 2014	2014–15	Heerenveen	1st place, gold medalist(s)	500m
13 December 2014	2014–15	Heerenveen	1st place, gold medalist(s)	1000m
14 December 2014	2014–15	Heerenveen	1st place, gold medalist(s)	500m
7 February 2015	2014–15	Heerenveen	1st place, gold medalist(s)	500m
7 February 2015	2014–15	Heerenveen	2nd place, silver medalist(s)	1000m
8 February 2015	2014–15	Heerenveen	1st place, gold medalist(s)	500m
8 February 2015	2014–15	Heerenveen	2nd place, silver medalist(s)	1000m
21 March 2015	2014–15	Erfurt	1st place, gold medalist(s)	500m
13 November 2015	2015–16	Calgary	1st place, gold medalist(s)	500m
14 November 2015	2015–16	Calgary	2nd place, silver medalist(s)	1000m
15 November 2015	2015–16	Calgary	1st place, gold medalist(s)	500m
20 November 2015	2015–16	Salt Lake City	1st place, gold medalist(s)	500m
21 November 2015	2015–16	Salt Lake City	1st place, gold medalist(s)	1000m
22 November 2015	2015–16	Salt Lake City	1st place, gold medalist(s)	500m
11 December 2015	2015–16	Heerenveen	1st place, gold medalist(s)	500m
12 December 2015	2015–16	Heerenveen	1st place, gold medalist(s)	1000m
29 January 2016	2015–16	Stavanger	1st place, gold medalist(s)	500m
30 January 2016	2015–16	Stavanger	1st place, gold medalist(s)	1000m
31 January 2016	2015–16	Stavanger	1st place, gold medalist(s)	500m
31 January 2016	2015–16	Stavanger	1st place, gold medalist(s)	1000m
12 November 2016	2016–17	Harbin	2nd place, silver medalist(s)	500m
12 November 2016	2016–17	Harbin	3rd place, bronze medalist(s)	1000m
13 November 2016	2016–17	Harbin	1st place, gold medalist(s)	500m
19 November 2016	2016–17	Nagano	3rd place, bronze medalist(s)	1000m
3 December 2016	2016–17	Astana	3rd place, bronze medalist(s)	500m
3 December 2016	2016–17	Astana	2nd place, silver medalist(s)	1000m
4 December 2016	2016–17	Astana	2nd place, silver medalist(s)	500m
12 November 2017	2017–18	Heerenveen	1st place, gold medalist(s)	1000m
16 November 2018	2018–19	Obihiro	2nd place, silver medalist(s)	500m
17 November 2018	2018–19	Obihiro	1st place, gold medalist(s)	500m
18 November 2018	2018–19	Obihiro	1st place, gold medalist(s)	1000m
7 December 2018	2018–19	Tomaszów Mazowiecki	1st place, gold medalist(s)	500m
7 December 2018	2018–19	Tomaszów Mazowiecki	1st place, gold medalist(s)	1000m
8 December 2018	2018–19	Tomaszów Mazowiecki	1st place, gold medalist(s)	500m
15 December 2018	2018–19	Heerenveen	1st place, gold medalist(s)	500m
16 December 2018	2018–19	Heerenveen	2nd place, silver medalist(s)	1000m
2 February 2019	2018–19	Hamar	1st place, gold medalist(s)	500m
3 February 2019	2018–19	Hamar	1st place, gold medalist(s)	500m
9 March 2019	2018–19	Salt Lake City	1st place, gold medalist(s)	500m
13 December 2019	2019–20	Nagano	1st place, gold medalist(s)	Team sprint
13 December 2019	2019–20	Nagano	3rd place, bronze medalist(s)	500 m
14 December 2019	2019–20	Nagano	2nd place, silver medalist(s)	500 m
15 December 2019	2019–20	Nagano	1st place, gold medalist(s)	1000 m
7 February 2020	2019–20	Calgary	2nd place, silver medalist(s)	500 m
8 February 2020	2019–20	Calgary	1st place, gold medalist(s)	1000 m
22 January 2021	2020–21	Heerenveen	3rd place, bronze medalist(s)	1000 m
30 January 2021	2020–21	Heerenveen	1st place, gold medalist(s)	500 m

== Awards ==
- Won the 2020 edition of the national sports award Pride of Russia, in the nomination Sportsman of the Year

Records
Preceded by (Canada) Jeremy Wotherspoon	Men's 500 m speed skating world record 15 November 2015 – present	Succeeded by Current holder
Preceded by (Netherlands) Kjeld Nuis	Men's 1000 m speed skating world record 15 February 2020 – present	Succeeded by Current holder
