= 2016 World Single Distances Speed Skating Championships =

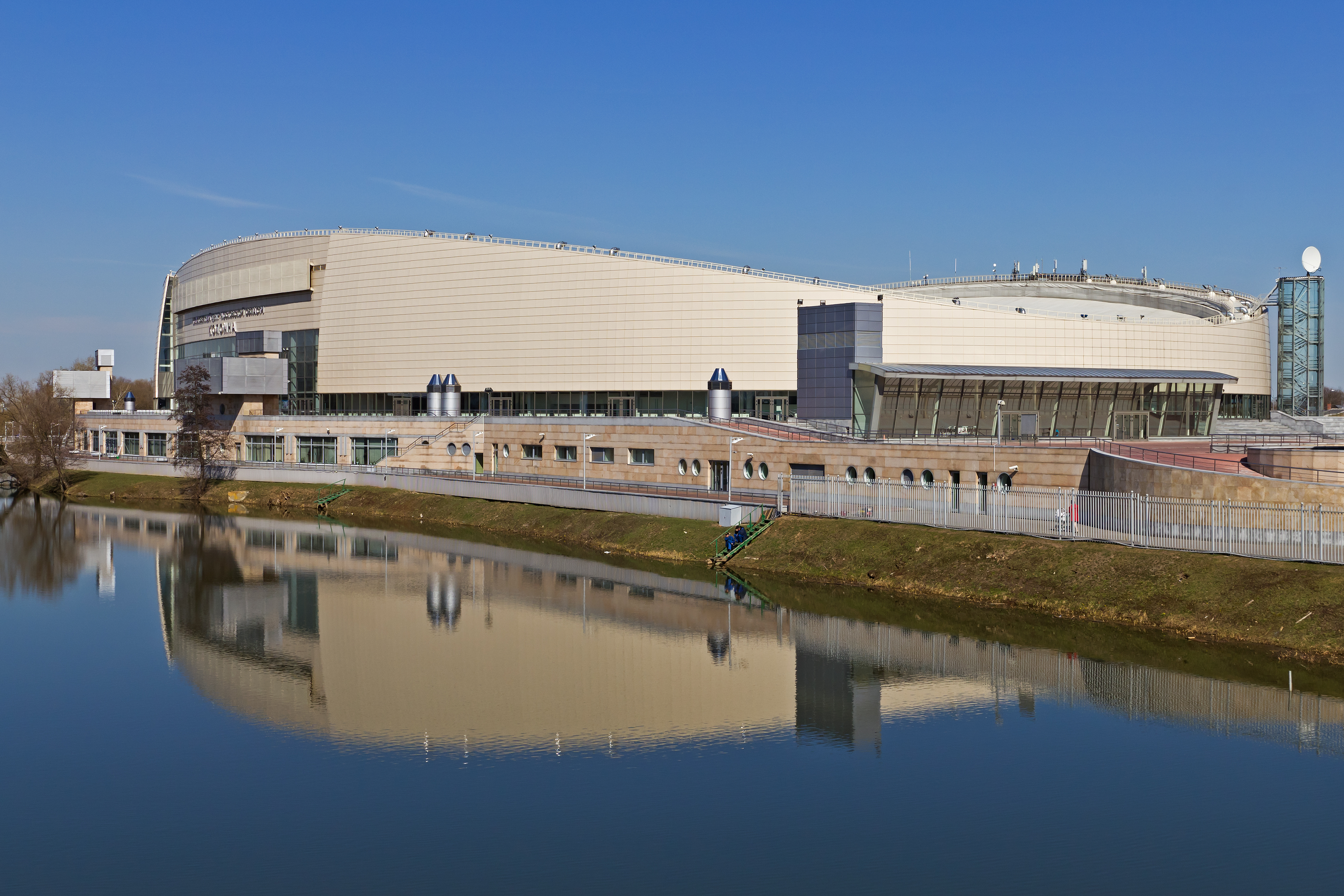
- Venue: Kolomna Speed Skating Center, Russia
- Dates: 11–14 February

The 2016 World Single Distances Speed Skating Championships was held between 11 and 14 February 2016 in Kolomna, Russia.

== Schedule ==
All times are local (UTC+3).

Date	Time	Events
11 February	16:45	10,000 m men
11 February	16:45	3000 m women
12 February	17:10	1000 m women
12 February	17:10	1500 m men
12 February	17:10	5000 m women
12 February	17:10	Team pursuit men
13 February	15:00	5000 m men
13 February	15:00	500 m women
13 February	15:00	1000 m men
13 February	15:00	Team pursuit women
14 February	14:30	500 m men
14 February	14:30	1500 m women
14 February	14:30	Mass start men
14 February	14:30	Mass start women

== Medal summary ==
=== Medal table ===
* Host nation (Russia)

Rank	Nation	Gold	Silver	Bronze	Total
1	Netherlands (NED)	6	5	5	16
2	Russia (RUS)*	3	2	1	6
3	South Korea (KOR)	2	1	0	3
4	Czech Republic (CZE)	2	0	0	2
5	Canada (CAN)	1	1	2	4
6	United States (USA)	0	3	2	5
7	Japan (JPN)	0	1	1	2
7	Norway (NOR)	0	1	1	2
9	China (CHN)	0	0	1	1
9	France (FRA)	0	0	1	1
Totals (10 entries)		14	14	14	42

=== Men's events ===
Event	Gold		Silver		Bronze	
500 m	Pavel Kulizhnikov; Russia	69.026	Ruslan Murashov; Russia	69.680	Alex Boisvert-Lacroix; Canada	69.788
1000 m	Pavel Kulizhnikov; Russia	1:08.33	Denis Yuskov; Russia	1:08.43	Kjeld Nuis; Netherlands	1:08.47
1500 m	Denis Yuskov; Russia	1:44.13	Kjeld Nuis; Netherlands	1:45.66	Thomas Krol; Netherlands	1:45.75
5000 m	Sven Kramer; Netherlands	6:10.31	Jorrit Bergsma; Netherlands	6:10.66	Sverre Lunde Pedersen; Norway	6:15.08
10000 m	Sven Kramer; Netherlands	12:56.77	Ted-Jan Bloemen; Canada	12:59.69	Erik Jan Kooiman; Netherlands	13:02.15
Team pursuit	Netherlands; Jan Blokhuijsen; Douwe de Vries; Arjan Stroetinga	3:40.04	Norway; Håvard Bøkko; Simen Spieler Nilsen; Sverre Lunde Pedersen	3:41.26	Canada; Jordan Belchos; Ted-Jan Bloemen; Benjamin Donnelly	3:43.28
Mass start	Lee Seung-hoon; South Korea	7:18.26	Arjan Stroetinga; Netherlands	7:18.32	Alexis Contin; France	7:18.41

=== Women's events ===
Event	Gold		Silver		Bronze	
500 m	Lee Sang-hwa; South Korea	74.859	Brittany Bowe; United States	75.663	Zhang Hong; China	75.688
1000 m	Jorien ter Mors; Netherlands	1:14.73	Heather Richardson-Bergsma; United States	1:14.94	Brittany Bowe; United States	1:15.01
1500 m	Jorien ter Mors; Netherlands	1:53.92	Heather Richardson-Bergsma; United States	1:54.67	Brittany Bowe; United States	1:55.09
3000 m	Martina Sáblíková; Czech Republic	4:03.05	Ireen Wüst; Netherlands	4:03.13	Antoinette de Jong; Netherlands	4:04.25
5000 m	Martina Sáblíková; Czech Republic	6:51.09	Carien Kleibeuker; Netherlands	6:54.96	Irene Schouten; Netherlands	6:55.93
Team pursuit	Netherlands; Antoinette de Jong; Marrit Leenstra; Ireen Wüst	2:58.12	Japan; Misaki Oshigiri; Miho Takagi; Nana Takagi	2:58.31	Russia; Olga Graf; Elizaveta Kazelina; Natalya Voronina	3:02.61
Mass start	Ivanie Blondin; Canada	8:17.53	Kim Bo-reum; South Korea	8:17.66	Miho Takagi; Japan	8:17.68

== Participating nations ==
161 speed skaters (not all skaters at the team pursuit included) from 24 nations participated at the championships. The number of speed skaters per nation that competed is shown in parentheses.

Participating nations
Click on a nation to go to the nations' 2016 Championships page
- Austria (5)
- Belarus (3)
- Belgium (3)
- Canada (19)
- China (11)
- Czech Republic (3)
- Denmark (1)
- Estonia (1)
- Finland (3)
- France (1)
- Germany (8)
- Italy (7)
- Japan (16)
- Kazakhstan (5)
- Latvia (1)
- Netherlands (22)
- New Zealand (2)
- Norway (11)
- Poland (6)
- Russia (16)
- South Korea (7)
- Sweden (1)
- Switzerland (1)
- United States (8)
