= Liu Fangyi =

Chinese speed skater

Liu Fangyi (Chinese: 刘方毅; born January 1, 1983, in Qiqihar) is a Chinese male speed skater.

He competed for China at the 2010 Winter Olympics in the 500m event.
