= Ruslan Murashov =

Russian speed skater

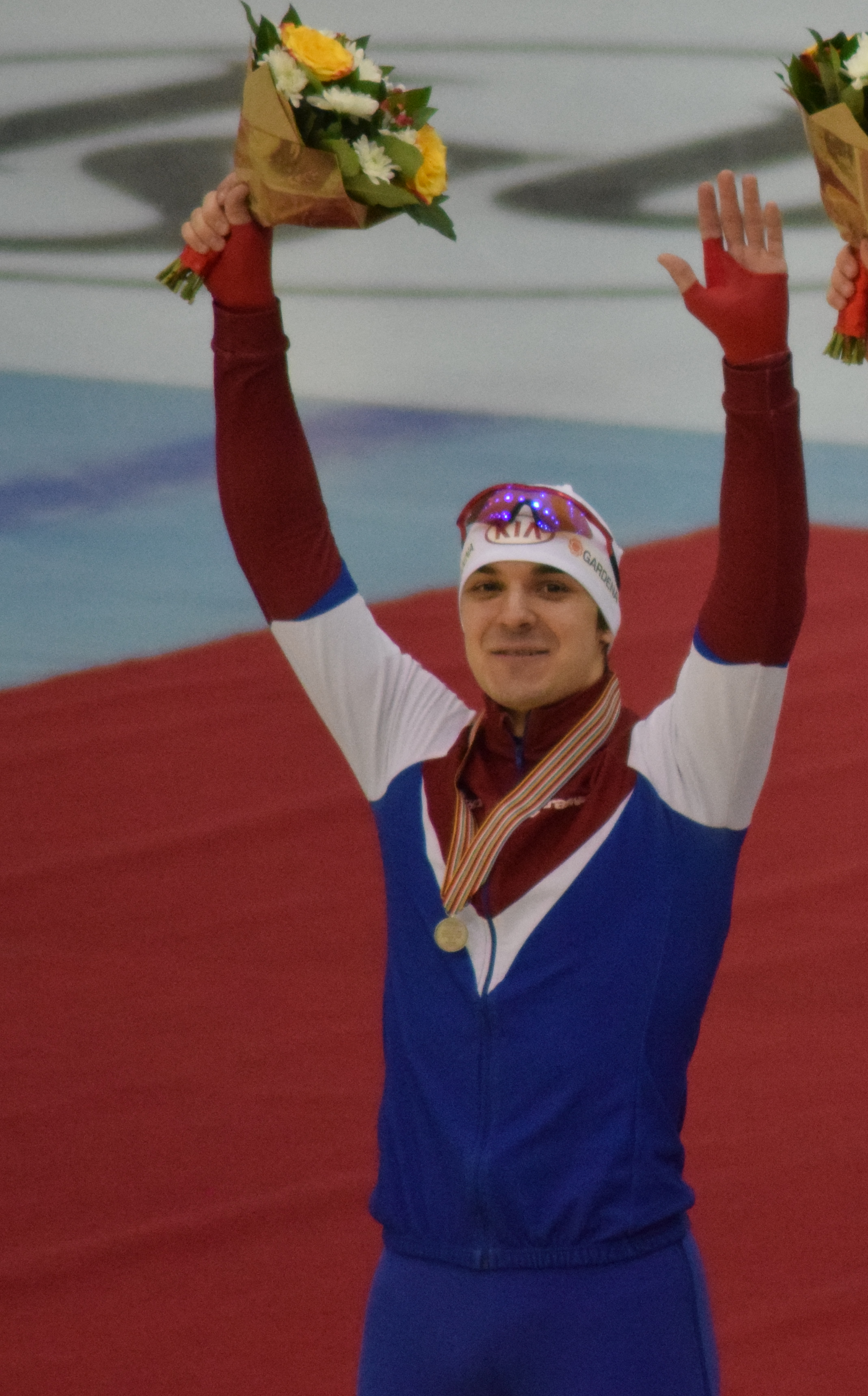
- Murashov at the 2016 World Single Distance Speed Skating Championships in Kolonma

Personal information
- Full name: Ruslan Nikolaevich Murashov
- Nationality: (Russia) Russian
- Born: 29 December 1992 (age 33) Voskresensk, Moscow Oblast, Russia
- Education: Moscow State Regional Institute of Social Studies and Humanities
- Height: 1.85 m (6 ft 1 in)
- Weight: 87 kg (192 lb)

Sport
- Country: Russia
- Sport: Speed skating
- Event(s): 500 m, team sprint
- Club: Central Sports Army Club
- Turned pro: 14 November 2014
Medal record
Men's speed skating
Representing Russia
World Single Distances Championships
Gold medal – first place	2019 Inzell	500 m
Silver medal – second place	2016 Kolomna	500 m
Silver medal – second place	2020 Salt Lake City	500 m
Bronze medal – third place	2017 Gangneung	500 m
Bronze medal – third place	2019 Inzell	Team sprint
European Championships
Gold medal – first place	2020 Heerenveen	Team sprint
Bronze medal – third place	2020 Heerenveen	500 m

Ruslan Nikolaevich Murashov (Russian: Руслан Николаевич Мурашов; born 29 December 1992) is a Russian speed skater.

== Personal life ==
Murashov is a former Ice hockey player in the Moscow club "Chemist" Voskresensk until he was 15 years old when he switched to training speed skating in Kolomna.

== Career ==
In 2011–2012, Murashov competed in the Junior World Cup series in 1000m and 500m. He debuted as a Senior in the 2013 season and competed at the 2013 Winter Universiade in Trentino, Italy. Murashov did not make the list and qualify for the Russian National team to compete at the 2014 Sochi Olympics.

In 2014–15, Murashov competed in men's 500m at the 2014–15 ISU World Cup at the first leg of the series in Obihiro, Japan he took the bronze medal behind teammate Pavel Kulizhnikov and another bronze in Seoul, Korea. At the Final of the World Cup in Erfurt, Germany, he won the gold clocking a time in 34.97; the results placed him 3rd in the overall rankings for the 2014–15 Season behind Canadian Laurent Dubreuil in men's 500m.

In the 2015/16 Season. Murashov opened his season finishing 7th in men's 500m and a bronze in Team Sprint (with Aleksey Yesin and Artyom Kuznetsov) at the 2015–16 ISU Speed Skating World Cup in Calgary. At the 2015–16 ISU Speed Skating World Cup in Heerenveen, Murashov won silver in Team sprint (with Aleksey Yesin, Artyom Kuznetsov and Kiril Golubev), and won his first individual medal of the season, gold in 500 m in a time of 34.67. At the ISU World Cup in Stavanger Murashov won the silver medal in men's 500 m behind teammate Pavel Kulizhnikov. On 11–14 February, at the 2016 World Single Distance Speed Skating Championships in Kolomna, Murashov won the silver medal in men's 500 m behind teammate Pavel Kulizhnikov. Murashov then competed at the 2016 World Sprint Speed Skating Championships in Seoul, South Korea and finished 11th in the overall classification. On 11–13 March, at the World Cup Final in Heerenveen, Murashov won gold and silver in 500m. His results rank him 2nd in the overall rankings for the 2015–16 World Cup Season behind teammate Pavel Kulizhnikov in men's 500m.

Murashov won the 500 m event at the 2019 World Single Distances Championships with a track record of 34.225.

== World Cup results ==
=== World Cup podiums ===
Date	Season	Location	Rank	Event
14 November 2014	2014–15	Obihiro	3rd place, bronze medalist(s)	500 m
21 November 2014	2014–15	Seoul	3rd place, bronze medalist(s)	500 m
22 March 2015	2014–15	Erfurt	1st place, gold medalist(s)	500 m
14 November 2015	2015–16	Calgary	3rd place, bronze medalist(s)	Team sprint
11 December 2015	2015–16	Heerenveen	2nd place, silver medalist(s)	Team sprint
13 December 2015	2015–16	Heerenveen	1st place, gold medalist(s)	500 m
29 January 2016	2015–16	Stavanger	2nd place, silver medalist(s)	500 m
31 January 2016	2015–16	Stavanger	2nd place, silver medalist(s)	500 m
11 March 2016	2015–16	Heerenveen	1st place, gold medalist(s)	500 m
12 March 2016	2015–16	Heerenveen	3rd place, bronze medalist(s)	Team sprint
13 March 2016	2015–16	Heerenveen	2nd place, silver medalist(s)	500 m
3 December 2016	2016–17	Astana	2nd place, silver medalist(s)	500 m
4 December 2016	2016–17	Astana	1st place, gold medalist(s)	500 m
9 December 2016	2016–17	Heerenveen	1st place, gold medalist(s)	500 m
29 January 2017	2016–17	Berlin	1st place, gold medalist(s)	500 m
12 November 2017	2017–18	Heerenveen	3rd place, bronze medalist(s)	Team sprint
12 November 2017	2017–18	Salt Lake City	3rd place, bronze medalist(s)	Team sprint
9 December 2017	2017–18	Salt Lake City	1st place, gold medalist(s)	500 m
25 November 2018	2018–19	Tomakomai	1st place, gold medalist(s)	Team sprint
9 December 2018	2018–19	Tomaszów Mazowiecki	3rd place, bronze medalist(s)	Team sprint
3 February 2019	2018–19	Hamar	2nd place, silver medalist(s)	500 m
6 December 2019	2019–20	Nur-Sultan	2nd place, silver medalist(s)	500 m
13 December 2019	2019–20	Nagano	1st place, gold medalist(s)	Team sprint
7 February 2020	2019–20	Calgary	1st place, gold medalist(s)	500 m
23 January 2021	2020–21	Heerenveen	3rd place, bronze medalist(s)	500 m

=== Overall rankings ===
Season	Event	Rank
2014–15	500 m	3rd place, bronze medalist(s)
2015–16	500 m	2nd place, silver medalist(s)
2015–16	Team sprint	2nd place, silver medalist(s)
