= Xie Jiaxuan =

Chinese speed skater

Personal information
- Nationality: China
- Born: 30 August 1994 (age 30)

Sport
- Sport: Speed skating

Xie Jiaxuan
- Simplified Chinese: 谢嘉轩
- Traditional Chinese: 謝嘉軒
Transcriptions
Standard Mandarin
- Hanyu Pinyin: Xiè Jiāxuān
- IPA: [ɕjê tɕjá ɕɥɛ́n]

Xie Jiaxuan (Chinese: 谢嘉轩; pinyin: Xiè Jiāxuān; Mandarin pronunciation: [ɕjê tɕjá ɕɥɛ́n]; born 30 August 1994) is a Chinese speed skater who competes internationally.

He participated at the 2018 Winter Olympics and competed in the men's 500m event finishing on 31st position.
