= Alex Boisvert-Lacroix =

Canadian speed skater

Personal information
- Born: 8 April 1987 (age 39) Sherbrooke, Quebec

Sport
- Country: Canada
- Sport: Speed skating
Medal record
World Championships
Bronze medal – third place	2016 Kolomna	500 m
Four Continents Championships
Silver medal – second place	2020 Milwaukee	500 m

Alex Boisvert-Lacroix (born 8 April 1987) is a Canadian speed skater who is specialized in the sprint distances.

== Career ==
Boisvert-Lacroix started his speed skating career as a short tracker and competed in his first World Cup in 2007. He switched from short track to long track speed skating in 2010. He won a bronze medal at the ISU World Cup in Calgary in November 2015 when he finished third in the 500m event. In December he won a silver medal when he finished second in the World Cup 500m event in Inzell. Boisvert-Lacroix is coached by Gregor Jelonek.

=== 2018 Olympics ===
After finishing in the top 5 in the 500 m event at the 2017–18 ISU Speed Skating World Cup, Boisvert-Lacroix pre-qualified for the 2018 Winter Olympics in Pyeongchang, South Korea.

== Personal records ==
Personal records
Men's speed skating
Event	Result	Date	Location	Notes
500 m	34.30	15 November 2015	Calgary	
1000 m	1:07.97	21 November 2015	Salt Lake City	
1500 m	1:50.13	16 March 2014	Calgary	
3000 m	4:04.57	12 October 2011	Calgary	

Source: SpeedskatingResults.com
