= William Dutton (speed skater) =

Canadian speed skater

Personal information
- Nationality: Canadian
- Born: November 28, 1989 (age 36) Regina, Saskatchewan
- Occupation: Athlete
- Height: 183 cm (6 ft 0 in) (2014)
- Weight: 82 kg (181 lb) (2014)

Sport
- Country: Canada
- Sport: Speed Skating, Ice Cross Downhill
- League: ISU, Red Bull Crashed Ice
- Club: Saskatoon Lion's Speed skating Club, Humboldt Speed Skating Club
- Coached by: Kevin Crockett (Overland)

Achievements and titles
- Olympic finals: 2014 Sochi Winter Olympics
- World finals: 2010 ISU World Sprint Championship, 2014 ISU World Sprint Championship, 2016 ISU World Cup Final
- National finals: 2017 Canadian Champion Men's 500 meter
- Updated on 7 February 2014

William Christian Dutton is a world class Canadian speed skater. He participated in the 2010 and 2014 Winter Olympics.

William Christian Dutton (born November 28, 1989) is a Canadian speed skater. He was born in Regina, Saskatchewan and raised in Humboldt Saskatchewan Dutton began training full-time with the Calgary Olympic Oval program at age 17. He has represented Canada at the ISU World Junior Championships, World Sprint Championships and the 2014 Olympics in Sochi where he raced in the 500 and 1000.

In the 2015–2016 season, Dutton earned his first career World Cup medal, winning a silver and a bronze in the 500m at the Calgary World Cup followed by 2 more medals in Salt Lake City. Dutton made his end of the season debut at the ISU World Single Distances Championship, finishing in 8th place for the 500 meter sprint.

Overall, Dutton holds 108 World Cup rankings, 118 National rankings, 1 World Cup gold medal, 2 silver, and 2 bronze for the 500 meter sprint.

== World Cup Medals ==
Medal	Distance/Discipline	Time	Date	Location/Notes
Bronze	500	34:46	13 Nov 2015	Calgary Olympic Oval
Silver	500	34:25 PB	15 Nov 2015	Calgary Olympic Oval
Bronze	500	34:35	20 Nov 2015	Salt Lake Oval
Silver	500	34:34	22 Nov 2015	Salt Lake Oval
Gold	Team Sprint	1:17.75 CR,WR*	22 Nov 2015	Salt Lake Oval
	new Olympic event	*unofficial WR		

== Early Canadian National Competition and Winter Games ==
Dutton has been a competitive long-track skater since 2002, when he first skated in a Canadian age-class championship in Sault Ste. Marie, Ontario; he and Humboldt Speed Skating Club teammates Addison and Ebony Thiel won a total of six medals. In the 2004 Canadian Long Track Mass Start Speed Skating Championships, Dutton won the bronze in the 1500-meter race. He skated at the 2007 Canada Winter Games in Whitehorse, winning a bronze medal in the 100-meter sprint.

== Junior ==
In the February 2009 Canadian Junior Championship at the Richmond Olympic Oval, Dutton placed third in the combined 500- and second in the 1000-meter sprints. That year he skated at the World Junior Championships in Zakopane, placing seventh overall in the combined 500.

Dutton skated the world's third-fastest junior 500 time (35.64 seconds) and became a member of the national development team. He qualified for the Canadian World Cup team for the first time and skated in the 500 and 1000 meter sprints at the Thialf in Heerenveen Netherlands on November 12 and 14.

== 2010 Olympic Trials and World Sprint Championship ==
In the 2010 Canadian Olympic trials, Dutton finished seventh in the combined sprints (two 500-meter races and one 1000-meter). On January 4 he was named by Speed Skating Canada's High Performance Committee to the Canadian World Sprint team for the 2010 ISU World Sprint Championships, held in Obihiro, Hokkaido on January 15 and 16.

Late in the 2011 season Dutton partially severed his Achilles tendon while practising starts, and the injury caused him to miss the first half of the World Cup season. After recovering, he qualified for spring World Cup racing and finished 12th in the 500 meters at the last World Cup meet of the year in Heerenveen.

At the 2013 Canadian Fall World Cup trials, William Dutton placed second at 500 and 1000 meters, posting personal best times at both distances. As a result of his trials result, he was named to the 2013 Canadian Fall World Cup team. In the first meet of the 2013-14 season, on November 8 at the Calgary oval, Dutton placed 15th in the Group A 500-meter race. The next day, when he raced Dimitri Lobkov, he sustained cuts to his right leg (requiring 12 stitches) in a fall in the last turn of the Men's A group 1000 and was carried off the ice on a stretcher. Although Dutton missed the second 500 in Calgary and the Salt Lake World Cup races, he returned to World Cup competition in Astana on November 30; he finished fourth in the Group B 1000 and third in the Group B 500. In the Berlin World Cup he finished first in the Group B 500, returning to Group A, and was 15th in the Group A 1000.

== 2014 Canadian Olympic Trials ==
During the 2013 pre-Olympics season, Dutton trained in Norway with American coach Peter Mueller of Norwegian professional team CBA and Speed Skating Canada chose not to name him to the 2013 national development team. Skating as an independent Dutton skated the men's 500 and 1000 meters at the Canadian Olympic trials in Calgary, qualifying at both distances. He and fellow Saskatchewan skater Marsha Hudey were two of three skaters not on the Canadian national or development teams to qualify for the Canadian Olympic team (the third was Vincent de Haitre of Ontario).

In the 2014, Canadian Olympic trials 1000 meter race. Dutton and Olympic silver medallist Denny Morrison were the next-to-last pairing in the 1000 meter Olympic qualifier. Morrison fell coming out of the last corner, sliding in front of Dutton. Dutton finished fourth and Morrison (given a re-skate after a mandatory rest period) did not make the top four. However, Canadian Olympic team member Gilmore Junio chose to give Morrison his spot in the Olympic 1000 meter race and Morrison won the silver medal.

== Red Bull Crashed Ice ==
In the fall of 2015 Dutton qualified for the fall World Cup races placing second in the 500 at Canadian trials. At the first World Cup meet of the year he placed 12th in race 1 of the 500 and 15th in Race 2. Dutton returned to Canada and missed the Canadian Single Distance Championship and Winter World Cup trials due to a groin injury. Dutton had long wanted to try Red Bull Crashed Ice. With some help from his friend Canadian Olympic and World Cup short track speed skater Francois Hamelin, Dutton was able to sign up for the Crashed Ice racing in Minneapolis, Finland and Edmonton. He cracked three ribs the first time he hit the 400 meter downhill ice cross track, cracked his wrist in another race and finished third behind fellow Canadians Scott Croxall and his brother Kyle Croxall in Crashed Ice Rider Cup Race in Finland.

== Retirement ==
Following the Crashed Ice season Dutton went to work as a carpenter in Calgary. He also enrolled in Firefighters College. Dutton hiked British Columbia's famous the West Coast Trail in June and made a decision to retire from speed skating making an official announcement that month.

== Comeback ==
Within two weeks of Dutton's retirement announcement Speed Skating Canada announced the hiring of Kevin Crockett as the sprint team speed coach. Crockett, who had previously spoken to Dutton about joining Crockett's International training group, talked Dutton into returning to the Canadian team. On November 13, 2015, almost exactly one year to the day Dutton was informed of his uncle Stephen's sudden and tragic death, he won his first World Cup medal. He followed that by winning four more medals at the first two World Cup meets of the season, Calgary and Salt Lake.

Dutton would have qualified for the 2018 Olympic Team, had Speed Skating Canada not used selection criteria that included the times of, then, banned Russian athletes. Dutton appealed the inclusion of the banned Russian athletes to the Sport Dispute Resolution Centre of Canada, and in a rare decision, was successful in having the Olympic nominations reconsidered. He was represented by Dr. Emir Crowne, Peter Linder QC, Amanda Fowler and Liam McFarlane. Upon reconsideration, however, Speed Skating Canada simply ratified their earlier choices. The New York Times reported the Canadian anti-doping luminary and long time International and Canadian Olympic Committee Member Dick Pound believed Dutton should have been in Korea with his team mates as a member of Canada's Olympic Team.

== Personal ==
Dutton is the son of Craig and Lynn Dutton. He has three sisters Brandi, Abbey and Mila. Mila suffers from Rett syndrome a physically and mentally debilitating disease. Dutton has stated that witnessing the challenges sister Mila faces in daily life have helped him overcome adversity. Dutton is the grandson of Bill Dutton, part-owner of the Arizona Coyotes who is the nephew of Hockey Hall of Famer Red Dutton. Though born in Regina, Dutton grew up in Humboldt, Saskatchewan.
