= Espen Aarnes Hvammen =

Norwegian speed skater

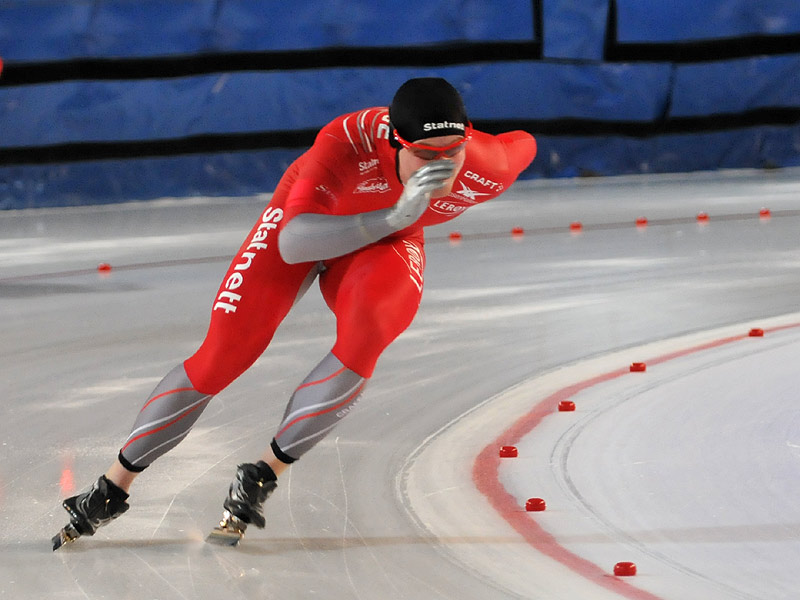
- Espen Aarnes Hvammen at the Norwegian Championships 2012 in Stavanger

Personal information
- Born: 13 November 1988 (age 37) Minnesund
- Height: 1.83 m (6 ft 0 in)

Sport
- Country: Norway
- Sport: Speed skating
- Club: Eidsvold Turn Skøyter
- Updated on 7 February 2014

Espen Aarnes Hvammen (Norwegian: [ˈɛ̂spn̩ ˈôːɳeːs ˈvɑ̀mn̩]; born 13 November 1988) is a Norwegian speed skater specialising in 500 and 1000 m races. Hvammen is a two-time Norwegian champion on the 500 m, and finished top-10 in two World Cup races during the 2010–11 season. Hvammen represents Eidsvold Turn.
