= Mirko Giacomo Nenzi =

Italian speed skater

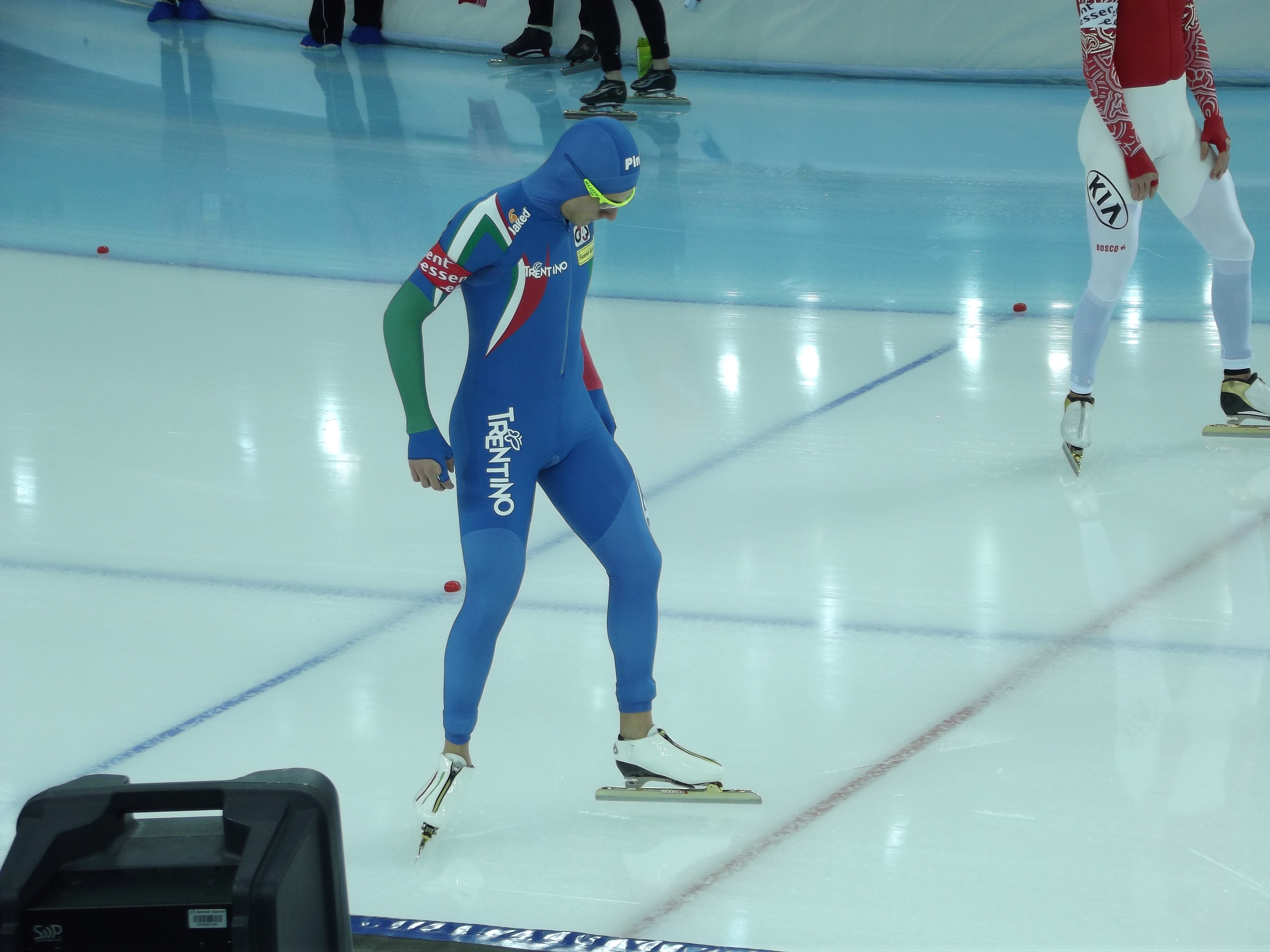
- Nenzi in 2013

Personal information
- Born: 14 November 1989 (age 36) Venice, Italy
- Height: 1.76 m (5 ft 9 in)
- Weight: 75 kg (165 lb)

Sport
- Country: Italy
- Sport: Speed skating

Mirko Giacomo Nenzi (born 14 November 1989) is an Italian speed skater. He finished sixth in the men's 1000 metres event at the 2013 World Single Distance Championships. At the 2013–14 ISU Speed Skating World Cup – World Cup 3 he won a silver medal, again in the 1000 metres.
