= Gilmore Junio =

Canadian speed skater

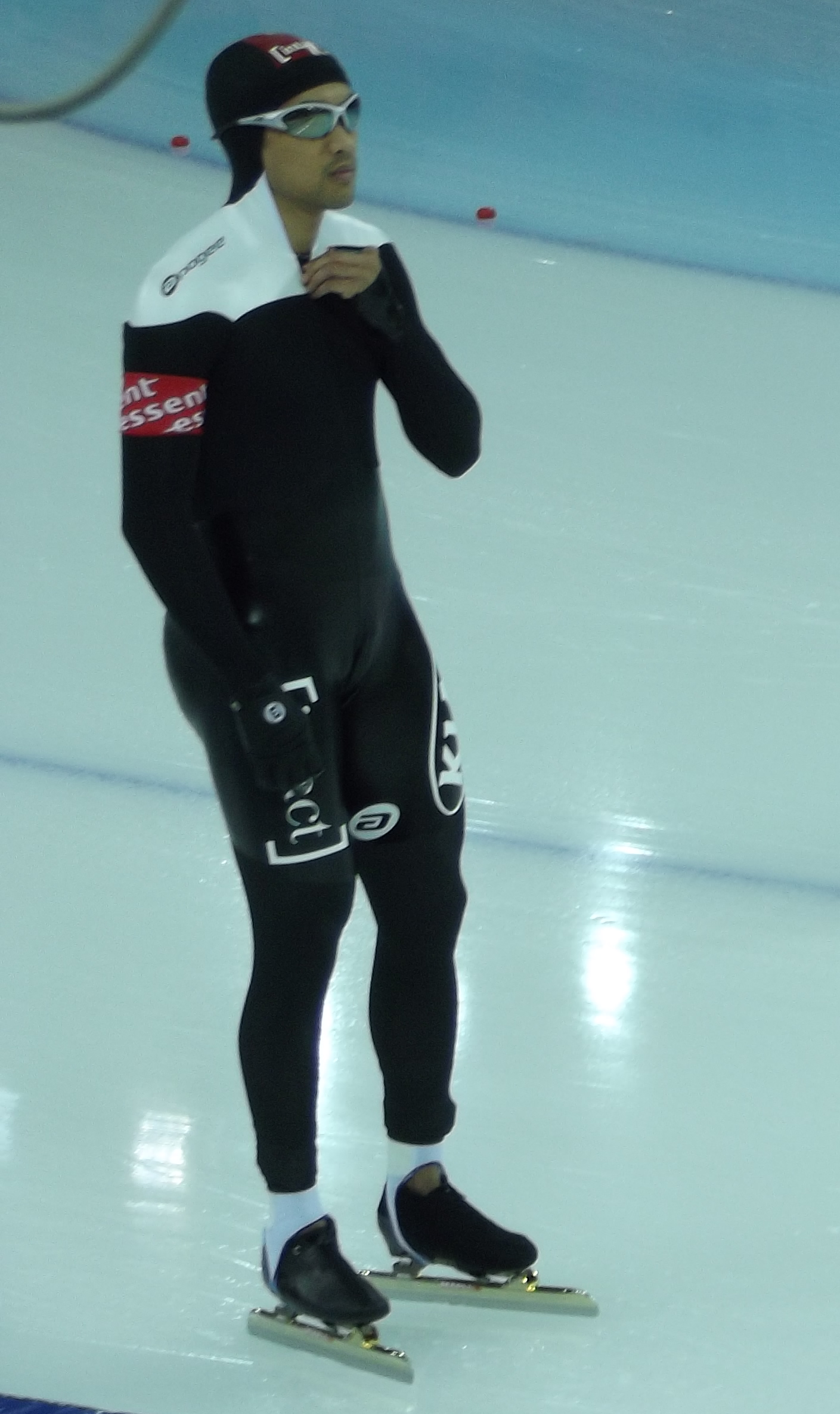
- Junio in 2013

Personal information
- Full name: Gilmore Vincent Junio
- Born: August 6, 1990 (age 36) Calgary, Alberta, Canada
- Height: 1.71 m (5 ft 7 in)
- Weight: 78 kg (172 lb)

Sport
- Country: Canada
- Sport: Speed skating

Gilmore Vincent Junio (born August 6, 1990), also known as Gimoy, is a Canadian speedskater from Calgary. He competes primarily in the short distances of 500 m and 1000 m. A three-time Olympian, Junio competed at the 2014 Olympic Games in Sochi, 2018 Olympic Games in PyeongChang, and 2022 Olympic Games in Beijing.

== Career ==
Junio won his first ISU World Cup event when he tied for the victory at the event in Salt Lake City during the 2013–14 season. He qualified for both the 500 m and 1,000 m at the 2014 Winter Olympics. After finishing in 10th place in the 500 m, Junio gave up his spot to Canadian teammate Denny Morrison, who went on to win the silver medal in the 1,000 m. After the race, he said, "I called it, so it feels good to be a prophet. A lot of kudos goes to this guy [Morrison] because he made it happen." Following his victory, Morrison started an on-line drive to nominate Gilmore as Canada's flag bearer at the closing ceremonies. Junio was awarded an honorary crowd-funded bronze medal by the Canadian public for his actions.

=== 2018 Winter Olympics ===
Junio qualified to compete for Canada at the 2018 Winter Olympics.
