= Roman Krech =

Kazakhstani speed skater (born 1989)

Personal information
- Nationality: Kazakhstani
- Born: 14 July 1989 (age 36)

Sport
- Sport: Speed skating
Medal record
Men's speed skating
Representing Kazakhstan
Four Continents Championships
Bronze medal – third place	2020 Milwaukee	500 m
Bronze medal – third place	2020 Milwaukee	Team Sprint

Roman Krech (Kazakh: Роман Креч; born 14 July 1989) is a Kazakhstani speed skater. He competed at the 2014 Winter Olympics in Sochi, in the 500 meters.
