= Mika Poutala =

Finnish speed skater and politician

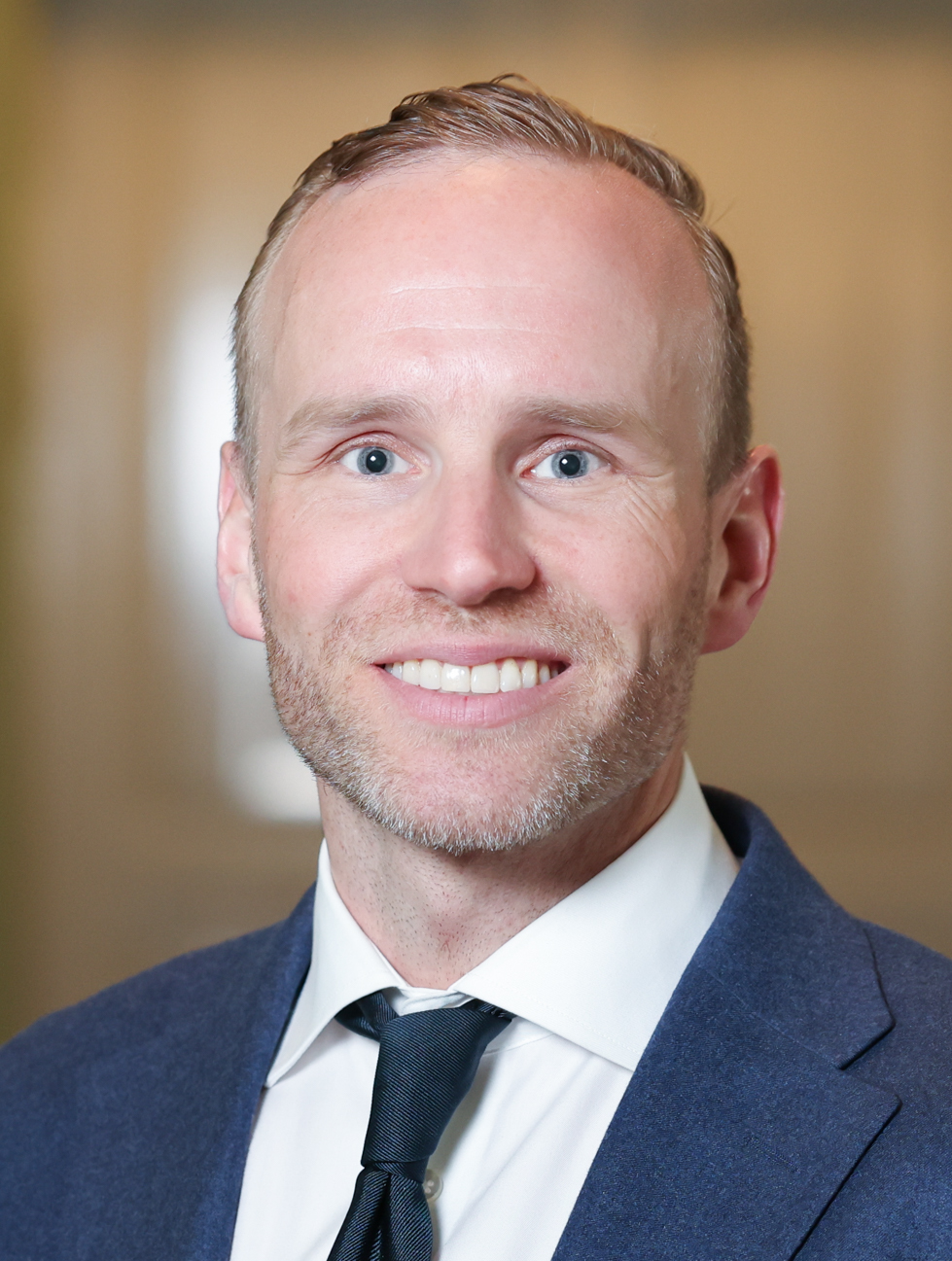
- Poutala in 2025

Minister of Youth, Sport and Physical Activity
- Incumbent
- Assumed office 13 June 2025
- Prime Minister: Petteri Orpo
- Preceded by: Sandra Bergqvist

Member of Parliament for Uusimaa
- Incumbent
- Assumed office 5 April 2023

Personal details
- Born: 20 June 1983 (age 43) Helsinki, Uusimaa, Finland
- Party: Christian Democrats
- Website: mikapoutala.fi
- Sports career
- Full name: Mika Kristian Poutala
- Height: 177 cm (5 ft 10 in)
- Weight: 79 kg (174 lb)
- Sport: Speed skating
Medal record
Men's speed skating
Representing Finland
European Single Distance Championships
| Silver medal – second place | 2018 Kolomna | 500 m |
| Silver medal – second place | 2018 Kolomna | Team Sprint |

Mika Kristian Poutala (born 20 June 1983 in Helsinki) is a Finnish Christian Democratic politician and a former speed skater specializing in sprint distances. Poutala held a Finnish record in the sport. Poutala was elected to Parliament in the 2023 parliamentary elections. Since 2023, he has served as the 1st Vice Chair of the Christian Democrats. Poutala has served as the Minister of Youth, Sport and Physical Activity in the Orpo cabinet since 13 June 2025.

Poutala is also a member of the Espoo City Council. He was elected to the council in the 2021 municipal elections with 969 votes.

As a speed skater, Poutala won a European Championship silver medal in the 500 meters and in the team sprint in 2018. He competed in the Olympics four times: Turin 2006, Vancouver 2010, Sochi 2014, and Pyeongchang 2018. His best Olympic result was fourth place in 2018, when he missed the bronze medal by three hundredths of a second. Poutala ended his athletic career in 2018. At club level, he represented Helsingin Työväen Luistelijat.

Poutala has been a member of the Board of the Finnish Olympic Committee.

== Background ==
Poutala was born in 1983 and spent his childhood in Helsinki. His father died when he was seven years old. Shortly after his father's death, Poutala began skating. He is professionally qualified as a ylioppilasmerkonomi (a Finnish matriculation‑level business diploma). He graduated from Mäkelänrinne Sports High School in 2002.

== Sports career ==
In 2004, Poutala won the 500‑meter event at the European Speed Skating Championships in Heerenveen. On 18 December 2005, he became the second Finn in history to win a World Cup event by skating the fastest time in the 100 meters in Inzell. In the 2005–2006 World Cup season, he placed second overall in the 100‑meter standings.

=== Major Championships ===
At the 2006 Winter Olympics in Turin, Poutala finished 22nd in the 500 meters and 26th in the 1,000 meters. At the 2010 Vancouver Olympics, he led the 500‑meter race after the first run and ultimately placed fifth. In the 1,000 meters he finished eighth. At the 2014 Sochi Olympics, he placed 29th in the 500 meters. At the 2018 Pyeongchang Olympics, he placed fourth in the 500 meters, missing an Olympic medal by just three hundredths of a second. In the 1,000 meters he finished sixteenth.

At the World Single Distances Championships, Poutala finished fourth in the 500 meters in Richmond (2009), Inzell (2011), and Kolomna (2016); seventh in Nagano (2008) and Heerenveen (2012); and tenth in Salt Lake City (2007). In the 1,000‑meter event, he placed ninth (2008) and tenth (2009, 2016).

At the World Sprint Speed Skating Championships, he placed fourth in Calgary (2012), fifth in Calgary (2017) and Changchun (2018), sixth in Heerenveen (2008), Moscow (2009), Obihiro (2010), and Seoul (2016), seventh in Salt Lake City (2013) and Astana (2015), and fifteenth in Hamar (2007).

Poutala won silver in the 500 meters at the 2018 European Championships in Kolomna with a time of 34.85, narrowly beating Russia's Pavel Kulizhnikov by four thousandths of a second. In the team sprint, he also won silver together with Pekka Koskela and Harri Levo. In the 1,000 meters he placed fifth.

=== World Cup and Records ===
In November 2007 in Salt Lake City, Poutala skated a combined sprint points total of 137.830, setting a new Finnish record—although Pekka Koskela, who set a 1,000‑meter world record in the same competition, skated faster times on three of the distances but skipped the final race. A week later in Calgary, Poutala set a new Finnish record in the 500 meters with a time of 34.39. In the overall World Cup standings for the 2007–2008 season, he placed second in the 100 meters.

In December 2009, he skated the 500 meters twice in Finnish record time (34.38) at the Calgary World Cup. His combined time of 68.76 was also a new Finnish record for the 2 × 500 meters. He finished first and second in the two events. The following weekend in Salt Lake City, he improved his 500‑meter national record to 34.31. In the 2009–2010 World Cup 500‑meter standings, he finished third overall.

On 13 November 2015, Poutala set a new Finnish record of 34.28 at the Calgary World Cup opening race, placing second. It was his first World Cup podium in more than five years. In 1,000‑meter World Cup races, he has finished second in Harbin (November 2016) and third in Salt Lake City (2009).

At the 2017 World Sprint Championships in Calgary, Poutala set Finnish records in both the 500 meters (34.23) and the overall sprint points total (136.635). On 8 December 2017 in Salt Lake City, he lowered his national record by another six hundredths. The time earned him second place in the race and remains the fifth-fastest result in history. This was Poutala's 18th World Cup podium and his 12th in the 500 meters.

Poutala announced in May 2018 that he was ending his speed skating career for family reasons.

=== Personal Bests ===
- 500 m: 34.17 NR (8 December 2017)
- 1,000 m: 1:07.24 (13 December 2009)
- 1,500 m: 1:46.53 (10 September 2016)
- Sprint total: 136.635 NR (25–26 February 2017)
- 2 × 500 m: 68.76 NR (4–5 December 2009)

=== Mitä menestyminen vaatii? – book ===
In 2015, Poutala published Mitä menestyminen vaatii?, a book about his sports career, through his sole proprietorship.

=== Muutaman sadasosan tähden – book ===
After Poutala ended his sports career, award-winning sports journalist and Ilta‑Sanomat sports editor Petri Lahti compiled his life story up to that point into a single volume. The book was published in 2019.

== Political career ==
Poutala was elected to the Espoo City Council in the 2021 municipal elections as a Christian Democrat candidate with 969 votes. In the following elections in 2025, Poutala increased his vote total and was re-elected to the Espoo City Council with 1,271 votes.

Poutala ran as a candidate in the 2023 parliamentary elections in the Uusimaa and was elected with 4,883 votes.

In August 2023, the Christian Democrats’ party congress elected Poutala as the party's first vice chair. At the party congress in Pori in August 2025, Poutala was re‑elected to continue in the same position.

=== Minister ===
President Alexander Stubb appointed Poutala on 13 June 2025 as the Minister of Youth, Sport and Physical Activity in the Orpo cabinet. In this position, Poutala heads the Department for Youth and Sport Policy within the Ministry of Education and Culture. As minister, Poutala has highlighted issues related to physical inactivity and the lack of outlook among young people. He has announced that his goal during his ministerial term is to meet 50,000 young people.

Based on these meetings, Poutala aims to compile a list of 100 concrete proposals intended to support the wellbeing of young people. He has also sought to reform the athlete support system into a multi-year model and improve pension security for athletes.

== Values ==
Based on his election compass responses, Poutala positions himself in the centre‑right. In Yle's election compass, he does not stand out clearly as either a strong conservative or a liberal. According to the GAL–TAN scale used by Helsingin Sanomat election compass, Poutala leans slightly toward national conservatism (TAN). His responses in the HS compass most strongly emphasize value‑conservative views.

== Personal life ==
After his sports career, Mika Poutala has worked as an entrepreneur.

In his free time, Poutala has performed Christian rap music under the stage name Plastic. He also created the Finnish team's official song for the Turin Olympics. Poutala is Pentecostal, a member of the Saalem congregation in Hakaniemi, and says he reads the Bible daily.

Poutala took part in the television show Tanssii tähtien kanssa ("Dancing with the Stars") in autumn 2019 and in Nelonen's Erikoisjoukot (“Special Forces”) in autumn 2025, which he won as the only contestant to complete the course.
