= Mitchell Whitmore =

American speed skater

Mitch Whitmore
Personal information
- Full name: Mitchell Ryan Whitmore
- Born: December 18, 1989 (age 36) Santa Ana, California, U.S.
- Height: 5 ft 9 in (1.75 m)
- Weight: 165 lb (75 kg)

Sport
- Country: United States
- Sport: Speed skating

Mitchell Ryan Whitmore (born December 18, 1989) is an American long track speed skater from Waukesha, Wisconsin. His coach is Mike Witty, whose sister Chris Witty won three Olympic medals, and trains at the Pettit National Ice Center in Milwaukee, Wisconsin. Although he took sixth place in the 10,000m event at the 2006 U.S. Speedskating Championships, Whitmore has turned his focus to the sprint events, earning a first-place finish in the 500m at the 2009 World Junior Speedskating Championships. He set a track record of 36.44 seconds in his first race at that event in Poland, also placing fourth in the 1000m. He was named to the U.S. team for the 2010 Winter Olympics by winning the 500 meter event at the 2009 U.S. Speedskating Championships in Salt Lake City with a combined time of 70.60 seconds. He graduated from Waukesha North High School in 2007 and currently is enrolled at the University of Wisconsin–Milwaukee, working towards a degree in psychology. He is the current 2010 U.S. Sprint Champion but finished 37th in the 500m event in Vancouver. He is a recent addition to the new and upcoming team SWIFT 2.0. He also broke the American record at 34.19 in Salt Lake City.

On April 1, 2016 the ISU announced Whitmore was suspended from April 1, 2016 to March 31, 2017 for an incident involving Team Corendon trainer Stefano Donagrandi in December 2015. The suspension was later rescinded.
