= Aleksey Yesin =

Russian speed skater

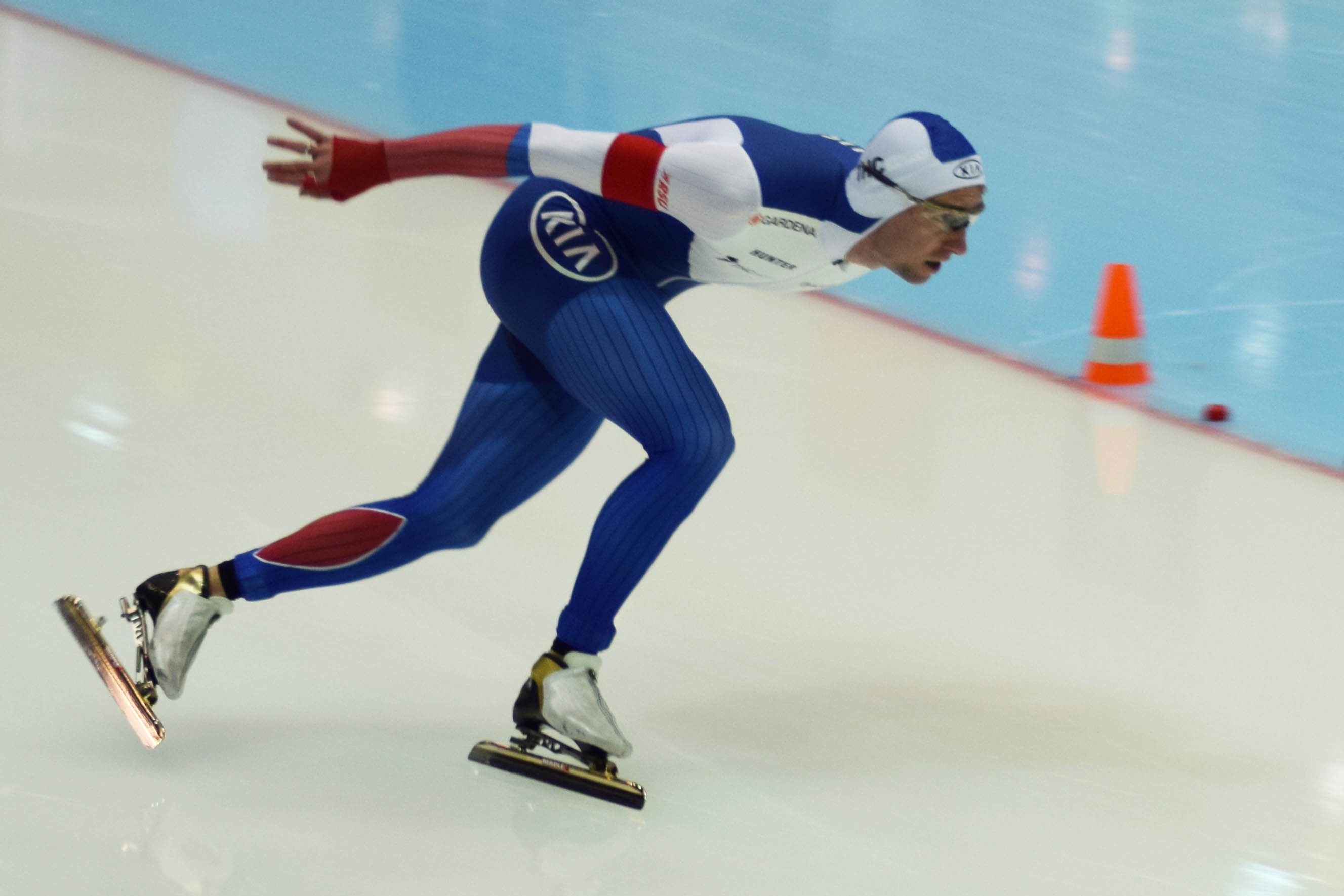
- Yesin in 2016

Personal information
- Born: 3 December 1987 (age 38) Kolomna, Soviet Union
- Height: 178 cm (5 ft 10 in)
- Weight: 85 kg (187 lb)

Sport
- Country: Russia
- Sport: Speed skating
Medal record
Men's speed skating
Representing Russia
World Sprint Championships
Bronze medal – third place	2015 Astana	Sprint

Aleksey Yuryevich Yesin (Russian: Алексей Юрьевич Есин; born 3 December 1987) is a Russian speed skater. He finished 12th in the men's 1000 metres event at the 2013 World Single Distance Championships.
