= 2023–24 ISU Speed Skating World Cup – World Cup 6 =

Ice skating competition in Quebec City, Canada

2023–24 ISU Speed Skating World Cup 6
- Venue: Centre de Glaces; Quebec City; Canada
- Dates: 2 — 4 February 2024

The sixth competition weekend of the 2023–24 ISU Speed Skating World Cup was held at the Centre de Glaces in Quebec City, Canada, from Friday, 2 February, until Sunday, 4 February 2024.

== Medal summary ==
=== Men's events ===
Event	Gold	Time	Silver	Time	Bronze	Time	Report
500 m (1)	Jordan Stolz; United States	34.51	Laurent Dubreuil; Canada	34.59	Yuma Murakami; Japan	34.67	
500 m (2)	Jordan Stolz; United States	34.36; TR	Marek Kania; Poland	34.69	Piotr Michalski; Poland	34.72	
1000 m	Jordan Stolz; United States	1:07.96	Tatsuya Shinhama; Japan	1:08.34	Ning Zhongyan; China	1:08.49	
1500 m	Jordan Stolz; United States	1:44.01; TR	Ning Zhongyan; China	1:44.79	Connor Howe; Canada	1:45.73	
5000 m	Ted-Jan Bloemen; Canada	6:13.87; TR	Davide Ghiotto; Italy	6:17.18	Hallgeir Engebråten; Norway	6:17.56	
Mass start^{A}	Shomu Sasaki; Japan	60	Chung Jae-won; South Korea	40	Livio Wenger; Switzerland	20	
Team sprint	Poland; Marek Kania; Piotr Michalski; Damian Żurek	1:18.71	Norway; Henrik Fagerli Rukke; Bjørn Magnussen; Håvard Holmefjord Lorentzen	1:18.80	United States; Austin Kleba; Cooper McLeod; Zach Stoppelmoor	1:18.81	

^{A} In mass start, race points are accumulated during the race based on results of the intermediate sprints and the final sprint. The skater with most race points is the winner.

=== Women's events ===
Event	Gold	Time	Silver	Time	Bronze	Time	Report
500 m (1)	Kim Min-sun; South Korea	37.69; TR	Femke Kok; Netherlands	37.70	Tian Ruining; China	38.05	
500 m (2)	Femke Kok; Netherlands	37.71	Kim Min-sun; South Korea	37.91	Erin Jackson; United States	37.94	
1000 m	Miho Takagi; Japan	1:14.19; TR	Femke Kok; Netherlands	1:15.07	Isabel Grevelt; Netherlands	1:15.72	
1500 m	Joy Beune; Netherlands	1:55.50	Han Mei; China	1:56.39	Melissa Wijfje; Netherlands	1:56.89	
3000 m	Irene Schouten; Netherlands	4:01.11	Joy Beune; Netherlands	4:02.62	Valérie Maltais; Canada	4:02.73	
Mass start^{A}	Sandrine Tas; Belgium	60	Ramona Härdi; Switzerland	43	Michelle Uhrig; Germany	24	
Team sprint	Netherlands; Marrit Fledderus; Naomi Verkerk; Femke Kok	1:27.09	Poland; Andżelika Wójcik; Iga Wojtasik; Karolina Bosiek	1:27.79	Kazakhstan; Inessa Shumekova; Alina Dauranova; Yekaterina Aydova	1:29.16	

^{A} In mass start, race points are accumulated during the race based on results of the intermediate sprints and the final sprint. The skater with most race points is the winner.

== Results ==
=== Men's events ===
==== 1st 500 m ====
The race started on 3 February 2024 at 15:51.

Rank	Pair	Lane	Name	Country	Time	Diff
1st place, gold medalist(s)	7	i	Jordan Stolz	United States	34.51	
2nd place, silver medalist(s)	9	o	Laurent Dubreuil	Canada	34.59	+0.08
3rd place, bronze medalist(s)	8	i	Yuma Murakami	Japan	34.67	+0.16
4	6	o	Marek Kania	Poland	34.72	+0.21
5	6	i	Janno Botman	Netherlands	34.89	+0.38
6	3	o	Piotr Michalski	Poland	34.93	+0.42
7	9	i	Wataru Morishige	Japan	34.96	+0.45
8	10	o	Kim Jun-ho	South Korea	34.99	+0.48
9	4	o	Bjørn Magnussen	Norway	35.04	+0.53
10	3	i	Cooper McLeod	United States	35.07	+0.56
11	1	o	Stefan Westenbroek	Netherlands	35.07	+0.56
12	4	i	David Bosa	Italy	35.09	+0.58
13	8	o	Damian Żurek	Poland	35.10	+0.59
14	1	i	Cho Sang-hyeok	South Korea	35.16	+0.65
15	5	o	Håvard Holmefjord Lorentzen	Norway	35.19	+0.68
16	2	o	Merijn Scheperkamp	Netherlands	35.21	+0.70
17	7	o	Yudai Yamamoto	Japan	35.42	+0.91
18	2	i	Takuya Morimoto	Japan	35.44	+0.93
19	10	i	Tatsuya Shinhama	Japan	35.47	+0.96
20	5	i	Nil Llop	Spain	35.63	+1.12

==== 2nd 500 m ====
The race started on 4 February 2024 at 15:22.

Rank	Pair	Lane	Name	Country	Time	Diff
1st place, gold medalist(s)	10	o	Jordan Stolz	United States	34.36; TR	
2nd place, silver medalist(s)	8	o	Marek Kania	Poland	34.69	+0.33
3rd place, bronze medalist(s)	3	i	Piotr Michalski	Poland	34.72	+0.36
4	8	i	Yuma Murakami	Japan	34.81	+0.45
5	10	i	Laurent Dubreuil	Canada	34.81	+0.45
6	9	o	Wataru Morishige	Japan	34.85	+0.49
7	4	o	Cooper McLeod	United States	34.89	+0.53
8	9	i	Kim Jun-ho	South Korea	34.93	+0.57
9	7	i	Damian Żurek	Poland	34.96	+0.60
10	3	o	Cha Min-kyu	South Korea	34.99	+0.63
11	6	i	Janno Botman	Netherlands	35.07	+0.71
12	1	i	Marten Liiv	Estonia	35.09	+0.73
13	4	i	Bjørn Magnussen	Norway	35.15	+0.79
14	6	o	Håvard Holmefjord Lorentzen	Norway	35.18	+0.82
15	7	o	Yudai Yamamoto	Japan	35.21	+0.85
16	5	i	David Bosa	Italy	35.23	+0.87
17	2	o	Mathias Vosté	Belgium	35.27	+0.91
18	1	o	Merijn Scheperkamp	Netherlands	35.33	+0.97
19	5	o	Nil Llop	Spain	35.55	+1.19
20	2	i	Takuya Morimoto	Japan	35.62	+1.26

==== 1000 m ====
The race started on 2 February 2024 at 14:05.

Rank	Pair	Lane	Name	Country	Time	Diff
1st place, gold medalist(s)	9	o	Jordan Stolz	United States	1:07.96	
2nd place, silver medalist(s)	10	o	Tatsuya Shinhama	Japan	1:08.34	+0.38
3rd place, bronze medalist(s)	9	i	Ning Zhongyan	China	1:08.49	+0.53
4	1	i	Mathias Vosté	Belgium	1:08.50	+0.54
5	2	i	Ryota Kojima	Japan	1:08.64	+0.68
6	10	i	Håvard Holmefjord Lorentzen	Norway	1:08.70	+0.74
7	8	i	Tim Prins	Netherlands	1:08.82	+0.86
8	7	o	Marten Liiv	Estonia	1:08.87	+0.91
9	3	i	Hendrik Dombek	Germany	1:08.95	+0.99
10	3	o	Conor McDermott-Mostowy	United States	1:09.01	+1.05
11	8	o	Taiyo Nonomura	Japan	1:09.13	+1.17
12	7	i	David Bosa	Italy	1:09.20	+1.24
13	4	i	Moritz Klein	Germany	1:09.23	+1.27
14	2	o	Cho Sang-hyeok	South Korea	1:09.29	+1.33
15	5	o	Connor Howe	Canada	1:09.29	+1.33
16	4	o	Cooper McLeod	United States	1:09.35	+1.39
17	6	o	Masaya Yamada	Japan	1:09.78	+1.82
18	1	o	Vincent De Haître	Canada	1:10.30	+2.34
19	5	i	Kazuya Yamada	Japan	1:12.80	+4.84
20	6	i	Damian Żurek	Poland	1:25.78	+17.82

==== 1500 m ====
The race started on 3 February 2024 at 14:30.

Rank	Pair	Lane	Name	Country	Time	Diff
1st place, gold medalist(s)	9	o	Jordan Stolz	United States	1:44.01; TR	
2nd place, silver medalist(s)	9	i	Ning Zhongyan	China	1:44.79	+0.78
3rd place, bronze medalist(s)	7	o	Connor Howe	Canada	1:45.73	+1.72
4	8	o	Hallgeir Engebråten	Norway	1:45.99	+1.98
5	8	i	Wesly Dijs	Netherlands	1:46.25	+2.24
6	3	o	Thomas Krol	Netherlands	1:46.26	+2.25
7	4	o	Allan Dahl Johansson	Norway	1:46.59	+2.58
8	3	i	Emery Lehman	United States	1:46.64	+2.63
9	6	i	Taiyo Nonomura	Japan	1:46.80	+2.79
10	4	i	Antoine Gélinas-Beaulieu	Canada	1:46.83	+2.82
11	10	o	Hendrik Dombek	Germany	1:47.02	+3.01
12	5	o	Seitaro Ichinohe	Japan	1:47.21	+3.20
13	2	i	Chung Jae-won	South Korea	1:47.38	+3.37
14	5	i	Alessio Trentini	Italy	1:47.56	+3.55
15	2	o	Stefan Emele	Germany	1:47.63	+3.62
16	1	i	An Hyun-jun	South Korea	1:47.76	+3.75
17	1	o	Vincent De Haître	Canada	1:47.76	+3.75
18	7	i	Masaya Yamada	Japan	1:47.91	+3.90
19	10	i	Kazuya Yamada	Japan	1:47.96	+3.95
20	6	o	Riku Tsuchiya	Japan	1:48.46	+4.45

==== 5000 m ====
The race started on 2 February 2024 at 15:59.

Rank	Pair	Lane	Name	Country	Time	Diff
1st place, gold medalist(s)	7	o	Ted-Jan Bloemen	Canada	6:13.87; TR	
2nd place, silver medalist(s)	7	i	Davide Ghiotto	Italy	6:17.18	+3.31
3rd place, bronze medalist(s)	8	i	Hallgeir Engebråten	Norway	6:17.56	+3.69
4	6	i	Michele Malfatti	Italy	6:20.49	+6.62
5	1	o	Timothy Loubineaud	France	6:21.55	+7.68
6	8	o	Sverre Lunde Pedersen	Norway	6:21.95	+8.08
7	5	o	Seitaro Ichinohe	Japan	6:22.92	+9.05
8	5	i	Casey Dawson	United States	6:23.57	+9.70
9	2	o	Marwin Talsma	Netherlands	6:24.33	+10.46
10	1	i	Marcel Bosker	Netherlands	6:24.88	+11.01
11	6	o	Yu Wu	China	6:25.56	+11.69
12	2	i	Ryosuke Tsuchiya	Japan	6:27.23	+13.36
13	3	o	Jesse Speijers	Netherlands	6:28.74	+14.87
14	3	i	Kristian Gamme Ulekleiv	Norway	6:28.93	+15.06
15	4	i	Riku Tsuchiya	Japan	6:30.77	+16.90
16	4	o	Graeme Fish	Canada	6:43.41	+29.54

==== Mass start ====
The race started on 3 February 2024 at 17:08.

Rank	Name	Country	Points	Time
1st place, gold medalist(s)	Shomu Sasaki	Japan	60	7:56.06
2nd place, silver medalist(s)	Chung Jae-won	South Korea	40	7:56.11
3rd place, bronze medalist(s)	Livio Wenger	Switzerland	20	7:56.15
4	Bart Hoolwerf	Netherlands	10	7:56.19
5	Andrea Giovannini	Italy	7	7:56.24
6	Daniele Di Stefano	Italy	5	8:33.43
7	Peter Michael	New Zealand	4	8:02.23
8	Lee Seung-hoon	South Korea	3	7:56.25
9	Mathieu Belloir	France	3	8:31.81
10	Sun Chuanyi	China	2	7:59.92
11	Marcel Bosker	Netherlands	2	8:00.97
12	Ethan Cepuran	United States	1	7:58.82
13	Antoine Gélinas-Beaulieu	Canada		7:56.39
14	Gabriel Odor	Austria		7:56.85
15	Kota Kikuchi	Japan		7:56.99
16	Conor McDermott-Mostowy	United States		7:57.13
17	Kristian Gamme Ulekleiv	Norway		7:57.22
18	Timothy Loubineaud	France		7:58.74
19	Artur Janicki	Poland		8:01.34
20	Allan Dahl Johansson	Norway		6:40.59

==== Team sprint ====
The race started on 4 February 2024 at 16:41.

Rank	Pair	Lane	Country	Time	Diff
1st place, gold medalist(s)	3	c	Poland; Marek Kania; Piotr Michalski; Damian Żurek	1:18.71	
2nd place, silver medalist(s)	5	c	Norway; Henrik Fagerli Rukke; Bjørn Magnussen; Håvard Holmefjord Lorentzen	1:18.80	+0.09
3rd place, bronze medalist(s)	5	s	United States; Austin Kleba; Cooper McLeod; Zach Stoppelmoor	1:18.81	+0.10
4	4	c	China; Liu Ze; Du Haonan; Deng Zhihan	1:19.64	+0.93
5	4	s	Netherlands; Stefan Westenbroek; Janno Botman; Wesly Dijs	1:19.76	+1.05
6	2	c	Germany; Hendrik Dombek; Moritz Klein; Stefan Emele	1:20.95	+2.24
7	2	s	Kazakhstan; Nikita Vazhenin; Altaj Zjardembekuly; Artur Galiyev	1:22.69	+3.98
8	1	s	Finland; Tuukka Suomalainen; Juuso Lehtonen; Samuli Suomalainen	1:23.17	+4.46
	3	s	Canada; Yankun Zhao; Anders Johnson; Antoine Gélinas-Beaulieu	Did not finish	

=== Women's events ===
==== 1st 500 m ====
The race started on 3 February 2024 at 15:21.

Rank	Pair	Lane	Name	Country	Time	Diff
1st place, gold medalist(s)	9	o	Kim Min-sun	South Korea	37.69; TR	
2nd place, silver medalist(s)	8	i	Femke Kok	Netherlands	37.70	+0.01
3rd place, bronze medalist(s)	6	i	Tian Ruining	China	38.05	+0.36
4	7	o	Rio Yamada	Japan	38.26	+0.57
5	9	i	Erin Jackson	United States	38.36	+0.67
6	6	o	Naomi Verkerk	Netherlands	38.36	+0.67
7	10	o	Kurumi Inagawa	Japan	38.38	+0.69
8	1	o	Isabel Grevelt	Netherlands	38.47	+0.78
9	4	o	Dione Voskamp	Netherlands	38.51	+0.82
10	2	o	Serena Pergher	Italy	38.58	+0.89
11	5	o	Carolina Hiller	Canada	38.62	+0.93
12	10	i	Marrit Fledderus	Netherlands	38.62	+0.93
13	5	i	Lee Na-hyun	South Korea	38.72	+1.03
14	3	i	Karolina Bosiek	Poland	38.77	+1.08
15	7	i	Yukino Yoshida	Japan	38.86	+1.17
16	8	o	Andżelika Wójcik	Poland	38.94	+1.25
17	1	i	Martine Ripsrud	Norway	38.95	+1.26
18	4	i	Sarah Warren	United States	38.95	+1.26
19	3	o	Kako Yamane	Japan	38.99	+1.30
20	2	i	Martyna Baran	Poland	39.12	+1.43

==== 2nd 500 m ====
The race started on 4 February 2024 at 15:52.

Rank	Pair	Lane	Name	Country	Time	Diff
1st place, gold medalist(s)	8	i	Femke Kok	Netherlands	37.71	
2nd place, silver medalist(s)	9	o	Kim Min-sun	South Korea	37.91	+0.20
3rd place, bronze medalist(s)	9	i	Erin Jackson	United States	37.94	+0.23
4	6	i	Tian Ruining	China	38.12	+0.41
5	6	o	Naomi Verkerk	Netherlands	38.25	+54
6	10	i	Marrit Fledderus	Netherlands	38.32	+0.61
7	10	o	Kurumi Inagawa	Japan	38.40	+0.69
8	5	i	Lee Na-hyun	South Korea	38.48	+0.77
9	8	o	Rio Yamada	Japan	38.50	+0.79
10	4	i	Karolina Bosiek	Poland	38.59	+0.88
11	2	i	Iga Wojtasik	Poland	38.61	+0.90
12	5	o	Carolina Hiller	Canada	38.63	+0.92
13	7	i	Yukino Yoshida	Japan	38.68	+0.97
14	4	o	Sarah Warren	United States	38.70	+0.99
15	7	o	Andżelika Wójcik	Poland	38.70	+0.99
16	2	o	Kim Min-ji	South Korea	38.71	+1.00
17	3	o	Kako Yamane	Japan	38.83	+1.12
18	3	i	Martyna Baran	Poland	39.04	+1.33
19	1	o	Heather Carruthers	Canada	39.19	+1.48

==== 1000 m ====
The race started on 2 February 2024 at 13:30.

Rank	Pair	Lane	Name	Country	Time	Diff
1st place, gold medalist(s)	9	i	Miho Takagi	Japan	1:14.19; TR	
2nd place, silver medalist(s)	8	i	Femke Kok	Netherlands	1:15.07	+0.88
3rd place, bronze medalist(s)	2	o	Isabel Grevelt	Netherlands	1:15.72	+1.53
4	9	o	Brittany Bowe	United States	1:16.16	+1.97
5	6	i	Lee Na-hyun	South Korea	1:16.36	+2.17
6	5	o	Tian Ruining	China	1:16.57	+2.38
7	4	o	Naomi Verkerk	Netherlands	1:16.60	+2.41
8	8	o	Karolina Bosiek	Poland	1:16.70	+2.51
9	3	i	Helga Drost	Netherlands	1:16.72	+2.53
10	10	i	Rio Yamada	Japan	1:16.88	+2.69
11	5	i	Maddison Pearman	Canada	1:17.15	+2.96
12	7	i	Yekaterina Aydova	Kazakhstan	1:17.17	+2.98
13	10	o	Ellia Smeding	United Kingdom	1:17.21	+3.02
14	2	i	Marrit Fledderus	Netherlands	1:17.21	+3.02
15	4	i	Sarah Warren	United States	1:17.29	+3.10
16	7	o	Erin Jackson	United States	1:17.36	+3.17
17	1	o	Martine Ripsrud	Norway	1:17.72	+3.53
18	6	o	Alina Dauranova	Kazakhstan	1:17.85	+3.66
19	3	o	Isabelle van Elst	Belgium	1:18.21	+4.02
20	1	i	Béatrice Lamarche	Canada	1:18.27	+4.08

==== 1500 m ====
The race started on 4 February 2024 at 14:30.

Rank	Pair	Lane	Name	Country	Time	Diff
1st place, gold medalist(s)	8	i	Joy Beune	Netherlands	1:55.50	
2nd place, silver medalist(s)	9	i	Han Mei	China	1:56.39	+0.89
3rd place, bronze medalist(s)	5	o	Melissa Wijfje	Netherlands	1:56.89	+1.39
4	7	i	Valérie Maltais	Canada	1:57.13	+1.63
5	9	o	Marijke Groenewoud	Netherlands	1:57.27	+1.77
6	3	o	Francesca Lollobrigida	Italy	1:57.61	+2.11
7	8	o	Ayano Sato	Japan	1:57.64	+2.14
8	10	o	Ivanie Blondin	Canada	1:57.78	+2.28
9	4	i	Yang Binyu	China	1:58.12	+2.62
10	7	o	Ragne Wiklund	Norway	1:58.35	+2.85
11	2	o	Abigail McCluskey	Canada	1:58.65	+3.15
12	6	i	Kaitlyn McGregor	Switzerland	1:58.88	+3.38
13	10	i	Brittany Bowe	United States	1:58.98	+3.48
14	3	i	Sumire Kikuchi	Japan	1:59.13	+3.63
15	2	i	Greta Myers	United States	1:59.32	+3.82
16	6	o	Esther Kiel	Netherlands	1:59.36	+3.86
17	1	o	Ellia Smeding	United Kingdom	1:59.47	+3.97
18	5	i	Yuna Onodera	Japan	1:59.57	+4.07
19	4	o	Isabelle van Elst	Belgium	1:59.85	+4.35
20	1	i	Yekaterina Aydova	Kazakhstan	2:02.13	+6.63

==== 3000 m ====
The race started on 2 February 2024 at 14:58.

Rank	Pair	Lane	Name	Country	Time	Diff
1st place, gold medalist(s)	5	i	Irene Schouten	Netherlands	4:01.11	
2nd place, silver medalist(s)	8	i	Joy Beune	Netherlands	4:02.62	+1.51
3rd place, bronze medalist(s)	6	i	Valérie Maltais	Canada	4:02.73	+1.62
4	2	i	Isabelle Weidemann	Canada	4:02.79	+1.68
5	7	i	Ragne Wiklund	Norway	4:04.09	+2.98
6	7	o	Martina Sábliková	Czech Republic	4:04.15	+3.04
7	2	o	Francesca Lollobrigida	Italy	4:04.34	+3.23
8	8	o	Marijke Groenewoud	Netherlands	4:04.80	+3.69
9	6	o	Sanne In 't Hof	Netherlands	4:05.92	+4.81
10	4	o	Momoka Horikawa	Japan	4:06.20	+5.09
11	5	o	Ivanie Blondin	Canada	4:07.07	+5.96
12	4	i	Yang Binyu	China	4:08.06	+6.95
13	1	o	Ayano Sato	Japan	4:11.21	+10.10
14	3	o	Yuna Onodera	Japan	4:11.90	+10.79
15	3	i	Magdalena Czyszczoń	Poland	4:12.54	+11.43
16	1	i	Kaitlyn McGregor	Switzerland	4:13.79	+12.68

==== Mass start ====
The race started on 4 February 2024 at 17:17.

Rank	Name	Country	Points	Time
1st place, gold medalist(s)	Sandrine Tas	Belgium	60	8:27.59
2nd place, silver medalist(s)	Ramona Härdi	Switzerland	43	8:27.77
3rd place, bronze medalist(s)	Michelle Uhrig	Germany	24	8:27.83
4	Kaitlyn McGregor	Switzerland	14	8:28.32
5	Magdalena Czyszczoń	Poland	12	8:29.56
6	Zuzana Kuršová	Czech Republic	4	8:30.34
7	Giorgia Birkeland	United States		8:38.58
8	Irene Schouten	Netherlands		8:42.60
9	Valérie Maltais	Canada		8:43.36
10	Mia Manganello	United States		8:44.03
11	Yang Binyu	China		8:44.03
12	Ivanie Blondin	Canada		8:49.34
13	Jin Wenjing	China		8:52.82
14	Olga Piotrowska	Poland		8:58.69
15	Marijke Groenewoud	Netherlands		8:17.40
15	Francesca Lollobrigida	Italy		8:17.49

==== Team sprint ====
The race started on 3 February 2024 at 16:30.

Rank	Pair	Lane	Country	Time	Diff
1st place, gold medalist(s)	3	c	Netherlands; Marrit Fledderus; Naomi Verkerk; Femke Kok	1:27.09	
2nd place, silver medalist(s)	4	s	Poland; Andżelika Wójcik; Iga Wojtasik; Karolina Bosiek	1:27.79	+0.70
3rd place, bronze medalist(s)	1	c	Kazakhstan; Inessa Shumekova; Alina Dauranova; Yekaterina Aydova	1:29.16	+2.07
4	3	s	China; Lina Zhang; Pei Chong; Tian Ruining	1:30.36	+3.27
5	2	c	United States; McKenzie Browne; Chrysta Rands; Greta Myers	1:30.50	+3.41
6	1	s	South Korea; Park Chae-eun; Kim Min-ji; Kang Soomin	1:31.56	+4.47
7	4	c	Germany; Josephine Heimerl; Anna Ostlender; Michelle Uhrig	1:32.25	+5.16
	2	s	Canada; Carolina Hiller; Maddison Pearman; Ivanie Blondin	Did not finish	
