= Speed skating at the 2022 Winter Olympics – Qualification =

The following is about the qualification rules and the quota allocation for the speed skating at the 2022 Winter Olympics.

== Qualification rules ==
A total quota of 166 athletes were allowed to compete at the Games. Countries were assigned quotas based on their performance during the 2021–22 ISU Speed Skating World Cup in the autumn of 2021. Each nation was permitted to enter a maximum of three athletes per gender for all events apart from the women's 5000m, men's 10000m and mass start events, for which they could enter a maximum of two athletes per event. Additionally, each nation is permitted to send at most 7 speed skating athletes per gender in total, or 8 when the nation is qualified for all events for the gender, or 9 when the nation is qualified with the maximum quota in every event for the gender.

=== Qualification times ===
The following qualification times were released on July 1, 2021, and were unchanged from 2018. Skaters had the time period of July 1, 2021 – January 16, 2022 to achieve qualification times at valid International Skating Union (ISU) events.

Event	Men	Women
500 metres	35.70	39.50
1000 metres	1:10.50	1:18.00
1500 metres	1:48.00	1:59.50
3000 metres	—N/a	4:12.00
5000 metres	6:30.00	7:20.00 or 4:08.00 (3000 m)
10,000 metres	13:30.00 or 6:25.00 (5000 m)	—N/a
Mass start	1:57.50 (1500 m)	2:10.00 (1500 m)

=== Maximum entries by country per event ===
Event	Men	Women
500 metres	3	3
1000 metres	3	3
1500 metres	3	3
3000 metres	—N/a	3
5000 metres	3	2
10,000 metres	2	—N/a
Mass start	2	2
Team pursuit	1 team	1 team

=== Maximum quotas per event ===
Men

Event	By Ranking	By time	Total
500 metres	20	10	30
1000 metres	20	10	30
1500 metres	20	10	30
5000 metres	14	6	20
10,000 metres	8	4	12
Mass start	24	—N/a	24

Women

Event	By Ranking	By time	Total
500 metres	20	10	30
1000 metres	20	10	30
1500 metres	20	10	30
3,000 metres	14	6	20
5000 metres	8	4	12
Mass start	24	—N/a	24

== Qualification timeline ==
Events	Date	Venue
ISU Speed Skating World Cup 1	12–14 November 2021	(Poland) Tomaszów Mazowiecki
ISU Speed Skating World Cup 2	19–21 November 2021	(Norway) Stavanger
ISU Speed Skating World Cup 3	3–5 December 2021	(United States) Salt Lake City
ISU Speed Skating World Cup 4	10–12 December 2021	(Canada) Calgary

== Qualification summary ==
On 22 December 2021, the ISU published their list of provisional allocations for each race and the total maximum allocation for each NOC. NOCs will inform the ISU how many quotas they will use by 16 January 2022, at which point either withdrawal or reallocation will be done to get to 166 total athletes. The final entries were revealed on January 24, 2022.

NOC	Men							Women							Total
NOC	500m	1,000m	1500m	5,000m	10,000m	MS	TP	500m	1,000m	1500m	3,000m	5,000m	MS	TP	Total
Argentina								~~0~~ 1							1
Austria						1		1	1						~~3~~ 2
Belgium		1	2	1	1	1		~~0~~ 1	~~0~~ 1	~~0~~ 1			1		~~7~~ 3
Belarus	1	1						1	2	2	1	1	1	X	~~10~~ 5
Canada	~~2~~ 3	3	~~2~~ 3	1	2	2	X	3	2	2	3	2	2	X	16
China	2	2	~~2~~ 3			1	X	2	3	3	2	1	2	X	14
Colombia													1		1
Czech Republic								1	1	1	2	1	1		~~7~~ 2
Denmark				~~0~~ 1		2									2
Estonia	1	1													~~2~~ 1
Germany	1	~~2~~ 1	~~2~~ 0	2	1	1		~~1~~ 0		1	~~0~~ 1		2		~~11~~ 5
Great Britain	~~0~~ 1	1	1						~~0~~ 1	~~0~~ 1					~~3~~ 2
Italy	2	1	1	3	2	1	X			1	1	1	1		~~12~~ 7
Japan	3	3	~~3~~ 2	1	1	1		3	2	2	2	2	2	X	15
Kazakhstan	~~0~~ 1	~~1~~ 2	1			1		1	2	2	1		1		~~9~~ 5
Latvia			~~0~~ 1												1
Netherlands	3	3	3	3	2	2	X	3	3	3	3	2	2	X	18
New Zealand			1												1
Norway	2	~~2~~ 3	3	1		2	X	2	1	2	1	1	1	X	~~15~~ 12
Poland	3	~~1~~ 2	~~0~~ 1			2		2	2	2			1	X	~~11~~ 10
ROC	3	2	~~2~~ 3	3	2	2	X	3	3	~~2~~ 3	2	1	1	X	16
Romania								~~0~~ 1	~~0~~ 1						1
South Korea	2	2	~~1~~ 2			2	X	1	2				2		10
Sweden				1	1										~~2~~ 1
Switzerland				1		1							1		~~3~~ 2
Chinese Taipei								1	1	1					~~4~~ 1
United States	2	2	~~2~~ 3	2		2	X	~~2~~ 3	2	2	~~0~~ 1		2		12
Total: 27 NOCs	(27)30	(28)30	(26)30	(19)20	12	24	8	(27)30	(27)30	(27)30	(18)20	12	24	8	(207)166 (87 men/79 women)

== Points Ranking ==
=== Men's 500m ===
The top 20 athletes, with a maximum of 3 per NOC, will earn a quota for their country.

After all 8 races

Pos.	Racer	(Poland) TOM 1	(Poland) TOM 2	(Norway) SOR 1	(Norway) SOR 2	(United States) SLC 1	(United States) SLC 2	(Canada) CGY 1	(Canada) CGY 2	Points	Note
1	Laurent Dubreuil (CAN)	48	54	60	54	48	48	60	48	420	Q
2	Wataru Morishige (JPN)	30	48	38	43	54	60	38	40	351	Q
3	Tatsuya Shinhama (JPN)	54	60	40	60	38	34	32	28	346	Q
4	Yuma Murakami (JPN)	43	30	32	28	40	36	48	54	311	Q
5	Artem Arefyev (ROC)	36	43	54	48	25	54	27	21	308	Q
6	Viktor Mushtakov (ROC)	38	38	21	40	43	0	43	60	283	Q
7	Yamato Matsui (JPN)	26	31	29	34	60	43	28	29	280	
8	Kim Joon-ho (KOR)	40	25	43	31	32	40	31	38	280	Q
9	Piotr Michalski (POL)	28	28	30	30	31	38	34	32	251	Q
10	Ignat Golovatsiuk (BLR)	28	40	24	21	23	25	29	43	233	Q
11	Cha Min-kyu (KOR)	23	28	36	24	28	30	24	30	223	Q
12	Håvard Holmefjord Lorentzen (NOR)	31	24	31	22	34	28	30	22	222	Q
13	Marek Kania (POL)	15	24	48	32	24	27	25	26	221	Q
14	Kai Verbij (NED)	34	36	34	25	30	32			191	Q
15	Damian Żurek (POL)	24	22	17	24	26	17	23	31	184	Q
16	Dai Dai N'tab (NED)	27	27	28	38	29	31			180	Q
17	Gao Tingyu (CHN)	60	34			28	0	54		176	Q
18	Ruslan Murashov (ROC)	22		24	29	13	21	40	27	176	Q
19	Merijn Scheperkamp (NED)	32	26	23	36	28	29			174	Q
20	Yang Tao (CHN)	21	29	26	11	10	13	28	34	172	Q
21	Alex Boisvert-Lacroix (CAN)	24	21	11	15	16	16	21	36	160	Q
22	Hein Otterspeer (NED)	29	34	27	26	36	0			152	
23	Takuya Morimoto (JPN)	17	17	15	14	24	26	12	24	149	
24	Gilmore Junio (CAN)	25	23	22	16	8	12	17	25	148	
25	Bjørn Magnussen (NOR)			28	27	15	15	15	28	128	
26	Pavel Kulizhnikov (ROC)	21	0	1	28	22	14	16	24	126	
27	Joel Dufter (GER)	7	14	13	0	11	24	26	21	116	
28	Liu An (CHN)	16	21	25	12	14	1	11	13	113	
29	Jeffrey Rosanelli (ITA)	9	16	21	23	0	10	14	15	108	
30	Mirko Giacomo Nenzi (ITA)	3	9	9	21	21	7	9	7	86	

=== Men's 1000m ===
The top 20 athletes, with a maximum of 3 per NOC, will earn a quota for their country.

After all 4 races

Pos.	Racer	(Poland) TOM	(Norway) SOR	(United States) SLC	(Canada) CGY	Points	Note
1	Thomas Krol (NED)	54	60	60		174	Q
2	Kjeld Nuis (NED)	48	48	54		150	Q
3	Håvard Holmefjord Lorentzen (NOR)	31	27	43	43	144	Q
4	Hein Otterspeer (NED)	60	34	48		142	Q
5	Ning Zhongyan (CHN)	34	43		60	137	Q
6	Laurent Dubreuil (CAN)	40	29	34	34	137	Q
7	Kai Verbij (NED)	36	54	40		130	
8	Masaya Yamada (JPN)	30	40	27	23	120	Q
9	Ignat Golovatsiuk (BLR)	29	28	32	31	120	Q
10	Cha Min-kyu (KOR)	28	30	25	36	119	Q
11	Cornelius Kersten (GBR)	24	32	31	32	119	Q
12	Connor Howe (CAN)	16	28	36	38	118	Q
13	Viktor Mushtakov (ROC)	43	25	0	48	116	Q
14	Marten Liiv (EST)	13	24	38	40	115	Q
15	Antoine Gélinas-Beaulieu (CAN)	32	26	23	29	110	Q
16	Taiyo Nonomura (JPN)	21	31	30	28	110	Q
17	Kim Min-seok (KOR)	26	36	26	21	109	Q
18	Ryota Kojima (JPN)	38	38	0	30	106	Q
19	Vincent De Haître (CAN)	27	23	24	24	98	
20	Merijn Scheperkamp (NED)	28	22	29		79	
21	Allan Dahl Johansson (NOR)		21	28	27	76	Q
22	Joel Dufter (GER)	25	9	16	26	76	Q
23	Jordan Stolz (USA)			21	54	75	Q
24	Pavel Kulizhnikov (ROC)		24	28	22	74	
25	Piotr Michalski (POL)	15	15	10	28	68	
26	Damian Żurek (POL)	17	17	9	25	68	
27	Lian Ziwen (CHN)	14	12	24		50	
28	Mathias Vosté (BEL)		21	13	16	50	
29	David Bosa (ITA)	2	8	17	13	40	
30	Henrik Fagerli Rukke (NOR)	12	2	14	12	40	

=== Men's 1500m ===
The top 20 athletes, with a maximum of 3 per NOC, will earn a quota for their country.

After all 4 races

Pos.	Racer	(Poland) TOM	(Norway) SOR	(United States) SLC	(Canada) CGY	Points	Note
1	Joey Mantia (USA)	48	54	60	60	222	Q
2	Ning Zhongyan (CHN)	54	60	54	0	168	Q
3	Connor Howe (CAN)	40	28	38	54	160	Q
4	Allan Dahl Johansson (NOR)	31	43	34	48	156	Q
5	Seitaro Ichinohe (JPN)	43	31	36	38	148	Q
6	Takuro Oda (JPN)	36	27	40	36	139	Q
7	Kim Min-seok (KOR)	60	48	29		137	Q
8	Peder Kongshaug (NOR)	34	32	32	32	130	Q
9	Bart Swings (BEL)	28	30	31	40	129	Q
10	Taiyo Nonomura (JPN)	24	38	27	28	117	Q
11	Thomas Krol (NED)	25	40	48		113	Q
12	Kristian Ulekleiv (NOR)	32	29	28	23	112	Q
13	Kazuya Yamada (JPN)	28	34	24	24	110	
14	Kjeld Nuis (NED)	38	36	30		104	Q
15	Emery Lehman (USA)	13	21	25	43	102	Q
16	Daniil Aldoshkin (ROC)	16	28	22	34	100	Q
17	Sergey Trofimov (ROC)	27	25	16	30	98	Q
18	Tyson Langelaar (CAN)	26	22	21	26	95	Q
19	Patrick Roest (NED)	29	26	23		78	Q
20	Mathias Vosté (BEL)	0	15	28	31	74	Q
21	Jan Blokhuijsen (NED)	30	23	21		74	
22	Shane Williamson (JPN)	21	24	17		62	
23	Hallgeir Engebråten (NOR)		21	11	28	60	
24	Stefan Emele (GER)	12	16	14	17	59	Q
25	Casey Dawson (USA)	0	5	24	29	58	
26	Cornelius Kersten (GBR)	14	17	10	15	56	
27	Dmitry Morozov (KAZ)	4	24	26	0	54	
28	Daniil Beliaev (ROC)	24	9	9	6	48	
29	Antoine Gélinas-Beaulieu (CAN)	22	8	4	12	46	
30	Wesly Dijs (NED)			43		43	

=== Men's 5000m and 10000m ===
The qualification points ranking for the men's 5000m and 10000m are combined. The top 14 athletes, with a maximum of 3 per NOC, will earn a quota for their country in the 5000m. The top 8 athletes, with a maximum of 2 per NOC, will earn a quota for their country in the 10000m.

After all 4 races

Pos.	Racer	(Poland) TOM	(Norway) SOR	(United States) SLC	(Canada) CGY	Points	Note
1	Nils van der Poel (SWE)	60	60	60	60	240	Q
2	Ted-Jan Bloemen (CAN)	54	48	34	48	184	Q
3	Davide Ghiotto (ITA)	36	38	48	54	176	Q
4	Bart Swings (BEL)	40	30	43	38	151	Q
5	Ruslan Zakharov (ROC)	30	36	40	43	149	Q
6	Aleksandr Rumyantsev (ROC)	38	40	26	36	140	Q
7	Jorrit Bergsma (NED)	43	54	38		135	Q
8	Patrick Beckert (GER)	31	34	36	34	135	Q
9	Patrick Roest (NED)	48	32	54		134	q
10	Seitaro Ichinohe (JPN)	28	29	32	32	121	q
11	Marwin Talsma (NED)	34	31	29	26	120	q
12	Andrea Giovannini (ITA)	26	23	27	31	107	q
13	Michele Malfatti (ITA)	21	29	28	29	107	q
14	Sergey Trofimov (ROC)	32		32	40	104	q
15	Peter Michael (NZL)	27	24	25	25	101	
16	Casey Dawson (USA)	20	21	25	30	96	
17	Ryosuke Tsuchiya (JPN)		36	30	27	93	
18	Danila Semerikov (ROC)	19	25	15	25	84	
19	Yegor Yunin (ROC)	10	16	28	28	82	
20	Marcel Bosker (NED)	25	22	0	32	79	

=== Men's Mass Start ===
The top 24 athletes, with a maximum of 2 per NOC, will earn a quota for their country in the mass start. The next 8 athletes will be on the reserve list. Up to six additional starting positions for the mass start will be made available during the games, given in reserve order, with priority given to countries that do not yet have an entry. However, only skaters that already took part in another event will be eligible.

After all 3 races

Pos.	Racer	(Poland) TOM SF	(Poland) TOM F	(United States) SLC SF	(United States) SLC F	(Canada) CGY SF	(Canada) CGY F	Points	Note
1	Bart Swings (BEL)	54	76	54	120	60	108	472	Q
2	Ruslan Zakharov (ROC)	38	108	43	96	60	80	425	Q
3	Andrea Giovannini (ITA)	48	86	34	80	54	86	388	Q
4	Chung Jae-won (KOR)	54	72	48	86	40	76	376	Q
5	Lee Seung-hoon (KOR)	43	0	60	60	43	60	266	Q
6	Ian Quinn (USA)	60	64	32		48	58	262	Q
7	Livio Wenger (SUI)	48	80	54	68			250	Q
8	Joey Mantia (USA)	60	58	60	62			240	Q
9	Antoine Gélinas-Beaulieu (CAN)	32		40	72	25	64	233	Q
10	Kristian Ulekleiv (NOR)	40	62	28		43	56	229	Q
11	Jorrit Bergsma (NED)	43	68	40	76			227	Q
12	Stefan Due Schmidt (DEN)	25		38	64	38	62	227	Q
13	Jordan Belchos (CAN)	26		36	56	36	68	222	Q
14	Albertus Hoolwerf (NED)	29		32		40	120	221	Q
15	Viktor Hald Thorup (DEN)	31		48	108	28		215	Q
16	Odin By Farstad (NOR)	23		43	58	38	50	212	Q
17	Masahito Obayashi (JPN)	38	120	29				187	Q
18	Felix Rijhnen (GER)	27		25		36	96	184	Q
19	Zbigniew Bródka (POL)	36	96	22		18		172	Q
20	Artur Janicki (POL)	28		30		34	72	164	Q
21	Danila Semerikov (ROC)	32		38	52	29		151	Q
22	Dmitry Morozov (KAZ)	34	60	26		30		150	Q
23	Gabriel Odor (AUT)	23		34	54	31		142	Q
24	Yahor Damaratski (BLR)	30		36	50	23		139	R1
25	Ning Zhongyan (CHN)					54	54	108	QH
26	Jordan Stolz (USA)					48	52	100	
27	Tai Wei-lin (TPE)	36	0	31		23		90	R2
28	Timothy Loubineaud (FRA)	30		30		30		90	R3
29	Haralds Silovs (LAT)	27		31		32		90	R4
30	Lukás Steklý (CZE)	40	0	24		25		89	R5
31	Peter Michael (NZL)	29		27		28		84	R6
32	Kars Jansman (NED)					34	48	82	
33	German Tirado (COL)	32		18		31		81	R7
34	Mathieu Belloir (FRA)	28		26		27		81	R8
35	Diogo Marreiros (POR)	25		28		27		80	
36	Evgeniy Bolgov (BLR)	34	0	20		21		75	
37	Kierryn Hughes (NZL)	24		25		22		71	
38	Kahanbai Alemasi (CHN)	22		29		19		70	
39	Oliver Grob (SUI)	21		19		24		64	
40	Botond Bejczi (HUN)	19		21		24		64	

=== Men's Team pursuit ===
The top six nations will earn a quota for the Team pursuit.

After all 3 races

Pos.	ou	(Poland) TOM	(United States) SLC	(Canada) CGY	Points	Note
1	United States	72	120	120	312	Q
2	Norway	86	108	108	302	Q
3	Canada	108	80	96	284	Q
4	Netherlands	120	76	72	268	Q
5	Italy	76	96	80	252	Q
6	China	80	86	76	242	Q
7	New Zealand	72	72	68	212	
8	Denmark	63	63	67	193	
9	Poland	67	58	63	188	
10	South Korea	58	67	54	179	
11	Japan	96	0	72	168	
12	Germany	52	56	58	166	
13	ROC	0	72	86	158	
14	Belarus	0	54	56	110	
15	Kazakhstan	56			56	
16	Switzerland	54			54	

=== Women's 500m ===
The top 20 athletes, with a maximum of 3 per NOC, will earn a quota for their country.

After all 8 races

Pos.	Racer	(Poland) TOM 1	(Poland) TOM 2	(Norway) SOR 1	(Norway) SOR 2	(United States) SLC 1	(United States) SLC 2	(Canada) CGY 1	(Canada) CGY 2	Points	Note
1	Erin Jackson (USA)	60	60	60	54	60	38	40	48	420	Q
2	Angelina Golikova (ROC)	43	54	43	48	54	54	48	60	404	Q
3	Nao Kodaira (JPN)	54	48	54	60	38	34	54	54	396	Q
4	Olga Fatkulina (ROC)	48	32	40	40	40	48	60		308	Q
5	Andzelika Wójcik (POL)	28	30	32	27	43	60	43	43	306	Q
6	Kaja Ziomek (POL)	40	28	48	38	25	29	32	40	280	Q
7	Tian Ruining (CHN)	36	40	27	30	34	36	38	38	279	Q
8	Daria Kachanova (ROC)	31	38	38	36	31	40	34		248	Q
9	Kim Min-sun (KOR)	25	24	28	31	30	28	36	34	236	Q
10	Hanna Nifantava (BLR)	32	43	30	24	22	27	29	27	234	Q
11	Arisa Go (JPN)	28	36	25	22	27	30	31	32	231	Q
12	Kimi Goetz (USA)	24	26	28	28	34	32	25	30	227	Q
13	Femke Kok (NED)	30	34	29	32	48	43			216	Q
14	Michelle de Jong (NED)	12	28	26	34	28	25	30	29	212	Q
15	Dione Voskamp (NED)	21	27	24	23	28	26	28	28	205	Q
16	Jutta Leerdam (NED)	29	29	36	43	36	21			194	
17	Jin Jingzhu (CHN)	38	25	31	29	26	31			180	Q
18	Maki Tsuji (JPN)	26	23	21	21	15	21	27	23	177	Q
19	Brooklyn McDougall (CAN)	24	21	13	28	23	22	21	22	174	Q
20	Kristina Silaeva (ROC)	13	21	23	14	14	24	24	36	169	
21	Heather Mclean (CAN)	27	22	24	26	10	12	15	24	160	Q
22	Marsha Hudey (CAN)	22	17	21	25	24	24	23	0	156	Q
23	Brittany Bowe (USA)	34	31	34				24	31	154	
24	Marrit Fledderus (NED)	17	24	22	16	13	17	16	26	151	
25	Yekaterina Aydova (KAZ)	15	16	11	0	16	28	26	28	140	
26	Kako Yamane (JPN)	21	12	15	21	24	13		24	130	
27	Huang Yu-ting (TPE)	11	14	14	24	21	16	12	16	128	
28	Zhang Lina (CHN)	16	13	9	9	21	23	17	17	125	
29	Kaylin Irvine (CAN)	14	15	12	15	11	11	21	25	124	
30	Julie Nistad Samsonsen (NOR)	7	8	8	11	13	14	10	13	84	

=== Women's 1000m ===
The top 20 athletes, with a maximum of 3 per NOC, will earn a quota for their country.

After all 4 races

Pos.	Racer	(Poland) TOM	(Norway) SOR	(United States) SLC	(Canada) CGY	Points	Note
1	Brittany Bowe (USA)	60	60	48	54	222	Q
2	Nao Kodaira (JPN)	48	48	36	60	192	Q
3	Miho Takagi (JPN)	54	54	60		168	Q
4	Angelina Golikova (ROC)	43	25	43	43	154	Q
5	Daria Kachanova (ROC)	30	38	38	36	142	Q
6	Li Qishi (CHN)	34	36	29	40	139	Q
7	Elizaveta Golubeva (ROC)	32	40	28	38	138	Q
8	Jutta Leerdam (NED)	40	43	54		137	Q
9	Kimi Goetz (USA)	29	34	34	34	131	Q
10	Yekaterina Aydova (KAZ)	28	28	30	32	118	Q
11	Andzelika Wójcik (POL)	27	30	26	29	112	Q
12	Olga Fatkulina (ROC)	0	31	28	48	107	
13	Ireen Wüst (NED)	38	32	32		102	Q
14	Karolina Bosiek (POL)	28	22	24	28	102	Q
15	Han Mei (CHN)	24	26	23	26	99	Q
16	Huang Yu-ting (TPE)	15	21	31	31	98	Q
17	Nikola Zdráhalová (CZE)	21	23	22	30	96	Q
18	Femke Kok (NED)	31	24	40		95	Q
19	Kim Hyun-yung (KOR)	24	29	21	21	95	Q
20	Lotte van Beek (NED)		28	27	27	82	
21	Jin Jingzhu (CHN)	25	27	25		77	Q
22	Kim Min-sun (KOR)	17	14	17	24	72	Q
23	Yin Qi (CHN)	14	13	16	28	71	
24	Valérie Maltais (CAN)	26	21		23	70	
25	Natalia Czerwonka (POL)	13	16	11	24	64	
26	Rio Yamada (JPN)		15	24	22	61	
27	Maddison Pearman (CAN)	12	11	14	12	49	
28	Marrit Fledderus (NED)	23	6	12	6	47	
29	Kaja Ziomek (POL)		17	6	21	44	
30	Kaylin Irvine (CAN)	22	3	3	13	41	

=== Women's 1500m ===
The top 20 athletes, with a maximum of 3 per NOC, will earn a quota for their country.

After all 4 races

Pos.	Racer	(Poland) TOM	(Norway) SOR	(United States) SLC	(Canada) CGY	Points	Note
1	Ayano Sato (JPN)	38	48	54	48	188	Q
2	Brittany Bowe (USA)	54	36	34	60	184	Q
3	Miho Takagi (JPN)	60	60	60		180	Q
4	Elizaveta Golubeva (ROC)	31	38	40	40	149	Q
5	Francesca Lollobrigida (ITA)	40	32	36	38	146	Q
6	Ragne Wiklund (NOR)	29	40	30	43	142	Q
7	Ireen Wüst (NED)	43	54	43		140	Q
8	Nadezhda Morozova (KAZ)	48	31	32	29	140	Q
9	Antoinette de Jong (NED)	36	43	48		127	Q
10	Han Mei (CHN)	32	30	27	36	125	Q
11	Ivanie Blondin (CAN)	30	27	28	34	119	Q
12	Nana Takagi (JPN)		28	31	54	113	Q
13	Isabelle Weidemann (CAN)	28	28	26	30	112	Q
14	Misaki Oshigiri (JPN)	27	29	29	27	112	
15	Irene Schouten (NED)	34	34	38		106	Q
16	Nikola Zdráhalová (CZE)	21	26	24	32	103	Q
17	Natalia Czerwonka (POL)	28	25	24	25	102	Q
18	Elena Eranina (ROC)	26	24	23	23	96	Q
19	Li Qishi (CHN)	23	12	21	31	87	Q
20	Yekaterina Aydova (KAZ)	24	22	10	26	82	Q
21	Yin Qi (CHN)	16	17	17	28	78	Q
22	Karolina Bosiek (POL)	25	23	8	21	77	
23	Daria Kachanova (ROC)	24	21		22	67	
24	Maddison Pearman (CAN)	15	10	14	24	63	
25	Jorien ter Mors (NED)	17	24	22		63	
26	Evgeniia Lalenkova (ROC)			25	28	53	
27	Alexa Scott (CAN)	13	15	11	11	50	
28	Mia Kilburg-Manganello (USA)	14	5	12	15	46	
29	Marijke Groenewoud (NED)	12	14	16		42	
30	Elena Sokhryakova (ROC)	11	9	7	12	39	

=== Women's 3000m and 5000m ===
The qualification points ranking for the women's 3000m and 5000m are combined. The top 14 athletes, with a maximum of 3 per NOC, will earn a quota for their country in the 3000m. The top 8 athletes, with a maximum of 2 per NOC, will earn a quota for their country in the 5000m.

After all 4 races

Pos.	Racer	(Poland) TOM	(Norway) SOR	(United States) SLC	(Canada) CGY	Points	Note
1	Isabelle Weidemann (CAN)	54	54	43	54	205	Q
2	Ragne Wiklund (NOR)	43	48	48	43	182	Q
3	Irene Schouten (NED)	60	60	60		180	Q
4	Francesca Lollobrigida (ITA)	48	38	34	60	180	Q
5	Martina Sáblíková (CZE)	38	43	40	48	169	Q
6	Joy Beune (NED)	40	30	36	36	142	Q
7	Ivanie Blondin (CAN)	34	40	38	27	139	Q
8	Natalya Voronina (ROC)	32	34	32	34	132	Q
9	Valérie Maltais (CAN)	29	29	31	38	127	q
10	Antoinette de Jong (NED)	36	36	54		126	q
11	Marina Zueva (BLR)	30	31	30	32	123	q
12	Misaki Oshigiri (JPN)	32	32	26	31	121	q
13	Ayano Sato (JPN)	31	29	28	30	118	q
14	Carlijn Achtereekte (NED)	26	36	27	28	117	
15	Han Mei (CHN)	25	24	28	29	106	q
16	Nadezhda Morozova (KAZ)	28	21	29	25	103	
17	Sanne in 't Hof (NED)	20	32	25	21	98	
18	Evgeniia Lalenkova (ROC)	27		25	40	92	
19	Nikola Zdráhalová (CZE)	28	19	8	28	83	
20	Claudia Pechstein (GER)	25	22	12	20	79	

=== Women's Mass Start ===
The top 24 athletes, with a maximum of 2 per NOC, will earn a quota for their country in the mass start. The next 8 athletes will be on the reserve list. Up to six additional starting positions for the mass start will be made available during the games, given in reserve order, with priority given to countries that do not yet have an entry. However, only skaters that already took part if another event will be eligible.

After all 3 races

Pos.	Racer	(Poland) TOM SF	(Poland) TOM F	(United States) SLC SF	(United States) SLC F	(Canada) CGY SF	(Canada) CGY F	Points	Note
1	Ivanie Blondin (CAN)	54	108	54	120	48	108	492	Q
2	Francesca Lollobrigida (ITA)	48	96	54	80	60	120	458	Q
3	Guo Dan (CHN)	38	72	38	76	48	86	358	Q
4	Elizaveta Golubeva (ROC)	54	60	48	44	54	96	356	Q
5	Mia Kilburg-Manganello (USA)	40	64	48	64	43	80	339	Q
6	Irene Schouten (NED)	60	120	60	86			326	Q
7	Marijke Groenewoud (NED)	60	86	60	108			314	Q
8	Kim Bo-reum (KOR)	43	76	43	58	40	46	306	Q
9	Park Ji-woo (KOR)	48	58	43	52	40	56	297	Q
10	Valérie Maltais (CAN)	36	56	36	56	34	72	290	Q
11	Michelle Uhrig (GER)	32		40	68	54	68	262	Q
12	Marina Zueva (BLR)	34	80	34	72	30		250	Q
13	Rin Kosaka (JPN)	34	68	25		34	76	237	Q
14	Sofie Karoline Haugen (NOR)	28		23	96	38	48	233	Q
15	Nadezhda Morozova (KAZ)	38	50	32		60	50	230	Q
16	Li Qishi (CHN)	43	62	0		43	64	212	Q
17	Claudia Pechstein (GER)	26		36	60	30	60	212	Q
18	Dessie Weigel (USA)	40	52	38	50	32		212	Q
19	Karolina Bosiek (POL)	36	54	30	54	26		200	Q
20	Momoka Horikawa (JPN)	32		40	62	32		166	Q
21	Nikola Zdráhalová (CZE)	31		29		36	62	158	Q
22	Sandrine Tas (BEL)	31		34	48	29		142	Q
23	Laura Isabel Gomez Quintero (COL)	27		24		28	54	133	Q
24	Nadja Wenger (SUI)	29		25	46	0		100	Q
25	Evelien Vijn (NED)					36	58	94	
26	Robin Groot (NED)					38	52	90	
27	Gemma Cooper (GBR)	27		31		28		86	R1
28	Elena Eranina (ROC)	30		31		23		84	R4
29	Yauheniya Varabyova (BLR)	25		28		31		84	R5
30	Natalia Jabrzyk (POL)	30		24		29		83	R6
31	Marit Fjellanger Bøhm (NOR)	28		29		25		82	R7
32	Zuzana Kursová (CZE)	29		27		25		81	R8
33	Katharina Thien (AUT)	24		26		27		77	R2
34	Zul Altan-Ochir (MGL)	24		22		26		72	R3
35	Ramona Härdi (SUI)			30		31		61	
36	Noemi Bonazza (ITA)	25		32		0		57	
37	Natalie Kerschbaummayr (AUT)			28		24		52	
38	Ainoa Carreño (ESP)					27		27	
39	Ranya Ezzi (SWE)			27				27	
40	Huang Yu-ting (TPE)			26				26	

=== Women's Team pursuit ===
The top six nations will earn a quota for the Team pursuit.

After all 3 races

Pos.	Country	(Poland) TOM	(United States) SLC	(Canada) CGY	Points	Note
1	Canada	120	120	120	360	Q
2	Japan	108	68	108	284	Q
3	Netherlands	96	108	76	280	Q
4	ROC	80	96	86	262	Q
5	Norway	76	86	80	242	Q
6	Poland	86	80	72	238	Q
7	Belarus	72	76	68	216	
8	United States	72	72	63	207	
9	Germany	63	67	72	202	
10	Switzerland	67	63	67	197	
11	China	0	72	96	168	

== Time Ranking ==
=== Men's 500m ===
The top 10 athletes not qualified through the point ranking, with a maximum of 2 per NOC, will earn a quota for their country. The top 8 unqualified athletes, including athletes who could not qualify through the time ranking because their NOC already has 2 quotas, will form the reserve list. Three quotas from the reserve list were available, green shading indicates acceptance.

After all 8 races

Pos.	Racer	Best Time	Note
1	Laurent Dubreuil (CAN)	33.778	PQ
2	Gao Tingyu (CHN)	33.876	PQ
3	Yuma Murakami (JPN)	33.898	PQ
4	Viktor Mushtakov (ROC)	33.903	PQ
5	Wataru Morishige (JPN)	33.997	PQ
6	Artem Arefyev (ROC)	34.003	PQ
7	Yamato Matsui (JPN)	34.048	
8	Ruslan Murashov (ROC)	34.088	PQ
9	Jordan Stolz (USA)	34.110	Q
10	Ignat Golovatsiuk (BLR)	34.123	PQ
11	Kim Joon-ho (KOR)	34.188	PQ
12	Piotr Michalski (POL)	34.189	PQ
13	Tatsuya Shinhama (JPN)	34.192	PQ
14	Alex Boisvert-Lacroix (CAN)	34.203	PQ
15	Yang Tao (CHN)	34.234	PQ
16	Damian Żurek (POL)	34.295	PQ
17	Håvard Holmefjord Lorentzen (NOR)	34.296	PQ
18	Kai Verbij (NED)	34.311	PQ
19	Joel Dufter (GER)	34.320	Q
20	Cha Min-kyu (KOR)	34.335	PQ
21	Dai Dai N'tab (NED)	34.349	PQ
22	Hein Otterspeer (NED)	34.360	
23	Bjørn Magnussen (NOR)	34.368	Q
24	Pavel Kulizhnikov (ROC)	34.404	
25	Takuya Morimoto (JPN)	34.428	
26	Marten Liiv (EST)	34.439	Q
27	David Bosa (ITA)	34.459	Q
28	Marek Kania (POL)	34.463	PQ
29	Henrik Fagerli Rukke (NOR)	34.479	R3
30	Merijn Scheperkamp (NED)	34.483	PQ
31	Gilmore Junio (CAN)	34.502	R4
32	Liu An (CHN)	34.511	R5
33	Jeffrey Rosanelli (ITA)	34.542	Q
34	Austin Kleba (USA)	34.569	Q
35	Artur Nogal (POL)	34.605	
36	Kim Tae-yun (KOR)	34.652	R6
37	Cooper McLeod (USA)	34.662	R7
38	Mirko Giacomo Nenzi (ITA)	34.713	R8
39	Hendrik Dombek (GER)	34.765	R9
40	Ronald Mulder (NED)	34.795	
41	Cornelius Kersten (GBR)	34.826	R1
42	Roman Krech (KAZ)	34.844	R2
43	Nico Ihle (GER)	34.845	R10
44	Jeong Seon Kyo (KOR)	34.858	
45	Yevgeniy Koshkin (KAZ)	34.868	R11
46	Zach Stoppelmoor (USA)	34.883	
47	Ivan Arzhanikov (KAZ)	34.901	
48	Tijmen Snel (NED)	34.936	
49	Xu Yutong (CHN)	34.959	
50	Nil Llop (ESP)	34.972	
51	Victor Lobas (ROC)	35.003	
52	Alexandr Klenko (KAZ)	35.054	
53	Serge Yoro (NED)	35.060	
54	Moritz Klein (GER)	35.106	
55	Cedrick Brunet (CAN)	35.109	
56	Lennart Velema (NED)	35.115	
57	Jacob Graham (CAN)	35.116	
58	Christian Oberbichler (SUI)	35.120	
59	Stefan Westenbroek (NED)	35.128	
60	Stefan Neumiarzhytski (BLR)	35.151	
61	Pål Myhren Kristensen (NOR)	35.170	
62	Sung Ching-yang (TPE)	35.278	
63	Kimani Griffin (USA)	35.281	
64	Artiom Chaban (BLR)	35.334	
65	Janno Botman (NED)	35.441	

=== Men's 1000m ===
The top 10 athletes not qualified through the point ranking, with a maximum of 2 per NOC, will earn a quota for their country. The top 8 unqualified athletes, including athletes who could not qualify through the time ranking because their NOC already has 2 quotas, will form the reserve list. Three quotas from the reserve list were available, green shading indicates acceptance.

After all 4 races

Pos.	Racer	Best Time	Note
1	Thomas Krol (NED)	1:06.448	PQ
2	Ning Zhongyan (CHN)	1:06.656	PQ
3	Kjeld Nuis (NED)	1:06.867	PQ
4	Hein Otterspeer (NED)	1:06.959	PQ
5	Jordan Stolz (USA)	1:06.968	PQ
6	Viktor Mushtakov (ROC)	1:06.988	PQ
7	Pavel Kulizhnikov (ROC)	1:07.005	Q
8	Håvard Holmefjord Lorentzen (NOR)	1:07.007	PQ
9	Lian Ziwen (CHN)	1:07.021	Q
10	Kai Verbij (NED)	1:07.037	
11	Marten Liiv (EST)	1:07.103	PQ
12	Piotr Michalski (POL)	1:07.135	Q
13	Connor Howe (CAN)	1:07.194	PQ
14	Laurent Dubreuil (CAN)	1:07.305	PQ
15	Cha Min-kyu (KOR)	1:07.322	PQ
16	Cornelius Kersten (GBR)	1:07.338	PQ
17	Ignat Golovatsiuk (BLR)	1:07.374	PQ
18	David Bosa (ITA)	1:07.408	Q
19	Joel Dufter (GER)	1:07.432	PQ
20	Ryota Kojima (JPN)	1:07.438	PQ
21	Taiyo Nonomura (JPN)	1:07.461	PQ
22	Merijn Scheperkamp (NED)	1:07.463	
23	Moritz Klein (GER)	1:07.531	Q
24	Joey Mantia (USA)	1:07.551	Q
25	Henrik Fagerli Rukke (NOR)	1:07.630	R2
26	Denis Kuzin (KAZ)	1:07.659	Q
27	Antoine Gélinas-Beaulieu (CAN)	1:07.696	PQ
28	Nico Ihle (GER)	1:07.746	R3
29	Mathias Vosté (BEL)	1:07.753	Q
30	Ivan Arzhanikov (KAZ)	1:07.820	R4
31	Allan Dahl Johansson (NOR)	1:07.992	PQ
32	Masaya Yamada (JPN)	1:07.993	PQ
33	Lennart Velema (NED)	1:08.025	
34	Damian Żurek (POL)	1:08.073	R5
35	Bjørn Magnussen (NOR)	1:08.175	
36	Tijmen Snel (NED)	1:08.182	
37	Kim Min-seok (KOR)	1:08.187	PQ
38	Hendrik Dombek (GER)	1:08.197	
39	Vincent De Haître (CAN)	1:08.212	
40	Austin Kleba (USA)	1:08.275	R6
41	Marek Kania (POL)	1:08.285	R7
42	Kazuya Yamada (JPN)	1:08.337	
43	Cooper McLeod (USA)	1:08.386	
44	Alexandr Klenko (KAZ)	1:08.403	R8
45	Serge Yoro (NED)	1:08.436	
46	Jeong Seon Kyo (KOR)	1:08.489	R9
47	Victor Lobas (ROC)	1:08.502	R10
48	Kimani Griffin (USA)	1:08.507	
49	Tyson Langelaar (CAN)	1:08.508	
50	Daniil Beliaev (ROC)	1:08.572	
51	Ruslan Murashov (ROC)	1:08.614	
52	Mamoru Takada (JPN)	1:08.620	
53	Dmitry Morozov (KAZ)	1:08.657	
54	Tai Wei-lin (TPE)	1:08.658	R1
55	Louis Hollaar (NED)	1:08.666	
56	Wang Haotian (CHN)	1:08.673	
57	Nil Llop (ESP)	1:08.869	
58	Victor Rudenko (BLR)	1:08.900	
59	Odin By Farstad (NOR)	1:08.910	
60	Kim Tae-yun (KOR)	1:08.946	
61	Mirko Giacomo Nenzi (ITA)	1:09.000	
62	Konrád Nagy (HUN)	1:09.017	
63	Jeffrey Rosanelli (ITA)	1:09.437	
64	Artem Arefyev (ROC)	1:09.625	
65	Diego Amaya (COL)	1:09.628	
66	Samuli Suomalainen (FIN)	1:09.677	
67	Ronald Mulder (NED)	1:10.059	
68	Christian Oberbichler (SUI)	1:10.176	
69	Stefan Neumiarzhytski (BLR)	1:10.240	
70	Ignaz Gschwentner (AUT)	1:10.296	

=== Men's 1500m ===
The top 10 athletes not qualified through the point ranking, with a maximum of 2 per NOC, will earn a quota for their country. The top 8 unqualified athletes, including athletes who could not qualify through the time ranking because their NOC already has 2 quotas, will form the reserve list. Seven quotas from the reserve list were available, green shading indicates acceptance, quotas achieved from points by Germany and Japan were refused.

After all 4 races

Pos.	Racer	Best Time	Note
1	Joey Mantia (USA)	1:41.154	PQ
2	Ning Zhongyan (CHN)	1:41.386	PQ
3	Thomas Krol (NED)	1:41.892	PQ
4	Wesly Dijs (NED)	1:42.382	
5	Connor Howe (CAN)	1:42.425	PQ
6	Takuro Oda (JPN)	1:42.445	PQ
7	Seitaro Ichinohe (JPN)	1:42.594	PQ
8	Allan Dahl Johansson (NOR)	1:42.619	PQ
9	Peder Kongshaug (NOR)	1:42.880	PQ
10	Bart Swings (BEL)	1:42.936	PQ
11	Kjeld Nuis (NED)	1:43.043	PQ
12	Kim Min-seok (KOR)	1:43.050	PQ
13	Mathias Vosté (BEL)	1:43.247	PQ
14	Emery Lehman (USA)	1:43.410	PQ
15	Kristian Ulekleiv (NOR)	1:43.435	PQ
16	Casey Dawson (USA)	1:43.493	R3
17	Taiyo Nonomura (JPN)	1:43.631	PQ
18	Daniil Aldoshkin (ROC)	1:43.662	PQ
19	Tyson Langelaar (CAN)	1:43.697	PQ
20	Hallgeir Engebråten (NOR)	1:43.715	
21	Dmitry Morozov (KAZ)	1:43.729	Q
22	Riku Tsuchiya (JPN)	1:43.746	
23	Wang Haotian (CHN)	1:43.820	Q
24	Stefan Emele (GER)	1:43.915	PQ
25	Shane Williamson (JPN)	1:43.940	
26	Sergey Trofimov (ROC)	1:44.037	PQ
27	Kazuya Yamada (JPN)	1:44.061	
28	Patrick Roest (NED)	1:44.199	PQ
29	Yegor Yunin (ROC)	1:44.205	R4
30	Cornelius Kersten (GBR)	1:44.295	Q
31	Lian Ziwen (CHN)	1:44.343	R5
32	Moritz Klein (GER)	1:44.510	Q
33	Marcel Bosker (NED)	1:44.830	
34	Daniil Beliaev (ROC)	1:44.967	
35	Alessio Trentini (ITA)	1:44.998	Q
36	Peter Michael (NZL)	1:45.031	Q
37	Odin By Farstad (NOR)	1:45.118	
38	Vincent De Haître (CAN)	1:45.176	R6
39	Antoine Gélinas-Beaulieu (CAN)	1:45.275	
40	Haralds Silovs (LAT)	1:45.344	R1
41	Park Seong-hyeon (KOR)	1:45.348	R7
42	Jan Blokhuijsen (NED)	1:45.373	
43	Andrea Giovannini (ITA)	1:45.401	R8
44	Denis Kuzin (KAZ)	1:45.501	R9
45	Ethan Cepuran (USA)	1:45.567	
46	Jakub Piotrowski (POL)	1:45.570	R2
47	Zbigniew Bródka (POL)	1:45.592	R10
48	Vitaliy Chshigolev (KAZ)	1:45.630	R11
49	Marcin Bachanek (POL)	1:45.715	R12
50	Louis Hollaar (NED)	1:45.763	
51	Sander Eitrem (NOR)	1:45.822	
52	Kim Cheol-min (KOR)	1:45.939	
53	Marten Liiv (EST)	1:46.117	
54	Tijmen Snel (NED)	1:46.163	
55	Ivan Arzhanikov (KAZ)	1:46.178	
56	Conor McDermott-Mostowy (USA)	1:46.208	
57	Demyan Gavrilov (KAZ)	1:46.400	
58	Tai Wei-lin (TPE)	1:46.491	
59	Michele Malfatti (ITA)	1:46.546	
60	Davide Ghiotto (ITA)	1:46.642	

=== Men's 5000m ===
The top 6 athletes not qualified through the point ranking, with a maximum of 2 per NOC, will earn a quota for their country. The top 8 unqualified athletes, including athletes who could not qualify through the time ranking because their NOC already has 2 quotas, will form the reserve list. One quota from the reserve list was available, green shading indicates acceptance

After all 3 races

Pos.	Racer	Best Time	Note
1	Nils van der Poel (SWE)	6:01.566	PQ
2	Patrick Roest (NED)	6:04.415	PQ
3	Davide Ghiotto (ITA)	6:07.271	PQ
4	Sergey Trofimov (ROC)	6:08.648	PQ
5	Bart Swings (BEL)	6:08.765	PQ
6	Ted-Jan Bloemen (CAN)	6:09.521	PQ
7	Ruslan Zakharov (ROC)	6:09.828	PQ
8	Jorrit Bergsma (NED)	6:09.946	PQ
9	Yegor Yunin (ROC)	6:10.569	
10	Marcel Bosker (NED)	6:10.626	
11	Casey Dawson (USA)	6:10.803	Q
12	Patrick Beckert (GER)	6:12.056	PQ
13	Felix Rijhnen (GER)	6:12.111	Q
14	Livio Wenger (SUI)	6:12.132	Q
15	Ethan Cepuran (USA)	6:12.378	Q
16	Aleksandr Rumyantsev (ROC)	6:12.430	PQ
17	Danila Semerikov (ROC)	6:12.809	
18	Sander Eitrem (NOR)	6:12.876	Q
19	Emery Lehman (USA)	6:13.198	R3
20	Seitaro Ichinohe (JPN)	6:13.427	PQ
21	Andrea Giovannini (ITA)	6:13.689	PQ
22	Riku Tsuchiya (JPN)	6:14.011	R4
23	Sverre Lunde Pedersen (NOR)	6:14.320	R5
24	Michele Malfatti (ITA)	6:15.065	PQ
25	Hallgeir Engebråten (NOR)	6:15.130	R6
26	Kars Jansman (NED)	6:15.560	
27	Ryosuke Tsuchiya (JPN)	6:15.584	R7
28	Jordan Belchos (CAN)	6:15.813	R8
29	Marwin Talsma (NED)	6:15.849	PQ
30	Shane Williamson (JPN)	6:17.151	
31	Felix Maly (GER)	6:17.308	R9
32	Masahito Obayashi (JPN)	6:17.459	
33	Peder Kongshaug (NOR)	6:17.505	
34	Viktor Hald Thorup (DEN)	6:17.687	R1
35	Timothy Loubineaud (FRA)	6:18.915	R2
36	Dmitry Morozov (KAZ)	6:19.262	
37	Peter Michael (NZL)	6:19.526	
38	Lee Seung-hoon (KOR)	6:20.336	
39	Chung Jae-won (KOR)	6:21.474	
40	Muhamaiti Hanahati (CHN)	6:22.132	
41	Kaleb Muller (CAN)	6:23.932	
42	Nicola Tumolero (ITA)	6:24.686	
43	Daniel Niero (ITA)	6:25.211	
44	Vitaliy Chshigolev (KAZ)	6:25.867	
45	Stefan Due Schmidt (DEN)	6:26.496	

=== Men's 10000m ===
The top 4 athletes not qualified through the point ranking, with a maximum of 2 per NOC, will earn a quota for their country. The top 8 unqualified athletes will form the reserve list.

After the only race has been held

Pos.	Racer	Best Time	Note
1	Nils van der Poel (SWE)	12:38.928	PQ
2	Jorrit Bergsma (NED)	12:56.088	PQ
3	Ted-Jan Bloemen (CAN)	13:00.230	PQ
4	Ryosuke Tsuchiya (JPN)	13:03.652	Q
5	Graeme Fish (CAN)	13:07.739	Q
6	Aleksandr Rumyantsev (ROC)	13:09.835	PQ
7	Kars Jansman (NED)	13:10.074	Q
8	Davide Ghiotto (ITA)	13:10.252	PQ
9	Michele Malfatti (ITA)	13:12.324	Q
10	Ruslan Zakharov (ROC)	13:12.892	PQ
11	Patrick Beckert (GER)	13:13.267	PQ
12	Danila Semerikov (ROC)	13:14.910	
13	Patrick Roest (NED)	13:15.085	
14	Peter Michael (NZL)	13:15.293	R1
15	Marwin Talsma (NED)	13:15.837	
16	Bart Swings (BEL)	13:18.039	PQ
17	Andrea Giovannini (ITA)	13:18.283	
18	Marcel Bosker (NED)	13:18.443	
19	Casey Dawson (USA)	13:19.507	R2
20	Riku Tsuchiya (JPN)	13:20.286	R5
21	Jordan Belchos (CAN)	13:20.564	
22	Felix Rijhnen (GER)	13:21.074	R6
23	Seitaro Ichinohe (JPN)	13:24.182	
24	Daniil Aldoshkin (ROC)	13:27.630	
25	Yegor Yunin (ROC)	13:28.031	
26	Timothy Loubineaud (FRA)	13:29.606	R3
27	Shane Williamson (JPN)	13:31.922	
28	Nicola Tumolero (ITA)	13:32.111	
29	Ethan Cepuran (USA)	13:32.689	R7
30	Fridtjof Petzold (GER)	13:34.745	
31	Sverre Lunde Pedersen (NOR)	13:35.217	R4
32	Felix Maly (GER)	13:36.283	
33	Sigurd Henriksen (NOR)	13:36.496	R8
34	Shen Hanyang (CHN)	13:37.152	
35	Takahiro Ito (JPN)	13:38.410	
36	Lee Seung-hoon (KOR)	13:40.453	
37	Hallgeir Engebråten (NOR)	13:41.065	
38	Chung Jae-won (KOR)	13:42.238	
39	Szymon Palka (POL)	13:46.397	
40	Yahor Damaratski (BLR)	13:53.289	

=== Men's Team pursuit ===
The top 2 nations not qualified through the point ranking will earn a quota. The top 3 unqualified nations will form the reserve list.

After all 3 races

Pos.	Country	Best Time	Note
1	United States	3:34.473	PQ
2	ROC	3:35.904	Q
3	Norway	3:36.242	PQ
4	Italy	3:37.989	PQ
5	Canada	3:38.604	PQ
6	China	3:38.930	PQ
7	Netherlands	3:39.796	PQ
8	South Korea	3:40.221	Q
9	Japan	3:40.634	R1
10	Denmark	3:40.880	R2
11	Poland	3:41.587	R3
12	Germany	3:44.607	
13	New Zealand	3:46.560	
14	Belarus	3:47.514	
15	Kazakhstan	3:57.516	
16	Switzerland	3:58.803	

=== Women's 500m ===
The top 10 athletes not qualified through the point ranking, with a maximum of 2 per NOC, will earn a quota for their country. The top 8 unqualified athletes, including athletes who could not qualify through the time ranking because their NOC already has 2 quotas, will form the reserve list. Four quotas from the reserve list were available, green shading indicates acceptance

After all 8 races

Pos.	Racer	Best Time	Note
1	Angelina Golikova (ROC)	36.669	PQ
2	Olga Fatkulina (ROC)	36.726	PQ
3	Nao Kodaira (JPN)	36.764	PQ
4	Andzelika Wójcik (POL)	36.775	PQ
5	Erin Jackson (USA)	36.809	PQ
6	Femke Kok (NED)	36.962	PQ
7	Daria Kachanova (ROC)	36.986	PQ
8	Tian Ruining (CHN)	37.035	PQ
9	Kaja Ziomek (POL)	37.083	PQ
10	Kristina Silaeva (ROC)	37.204	
11	Kim Min-sun (KOR)	37.205	PQ
12	Jutta Leerdam (NED)	37.226	
13	Kimi Goetz (USA)	37.251	PQ
14	Jin Jingzhu (CHN)	37.290	PQ
15	Miho Takagi (JPN)	37.299	
16	Arisa Go (JPN)	37.323	PQ
17	Brittany Bowe (USA)	37.395	R5
18	Vanessa Herzog (AUT)	37.461	Q
19	Michelle de Jong (NED)	37.523	PQ
20	Yekaterina Aydova (KAZ)	37.558	Q
21	Hanna Nifantava (BLR)	37.563	PQ
22	Dione Voskamp (NED)	37.574	PQ
23	Kako Yamane (JPN)	37.757	
24	Maki Tsuji (JPN)	37.813	PQ
25	Marsha Hudey (CAN)	37.843	PQ
26	Marrit Fledderus (NED)	37.868	
27	Huang Yu-ting (TPE)	37.878	Q
28	Letitia de Jong (NED)	37.926	
29	Karolina Bosiek (POL)	37.928	R6
30	Julie Nistad Samsonsen (NOR)	37.943	Q
31	Zhang Lina (CHN)	37.981	R7
32	Kaylin Irvine (CAN)	38.007	
33	Rio Yamada (JPN)	38.053	
34	Brooklyn McDougall (CAN)	38.074	PQ
35	Heather Mclean (CAN)	38.086	PQ
36	Nikola Zdráhalová (CZE)	38.108	Q
37	Martine Ripsrud (NOR)	38.120	Q
38	Elizaveta Agafoshina (ROC)	38.214	
39	Sarah Warren (USA)	38.247	
40	Pei Chong (CHN)	38.247	
41	Femke Beuling (NED)	38.298	
42	Sophie Warmuth (GER)	38.349	Q
43	Maria Victoria Rodriguez (ARG)	38.354	R1
44	Kim Hyun-yung (KOR)	38.366	R8
45	Mihaela Hogas (ROU)	38.377	R2
46	Park Chae-eun (KOR)	38.653	R9
47	Brianna Bocox (USA)	38.653	
48	Sandrine Tas (BEL)	38.667	R3
49	Ekaterina Sloeva (BLR)	38.878	R10
50	Ellia Smeding (GBR)	38.985	R4
51	Maddison Pearman (CAN)	39.102	
52	Lea-Sophie Scholz (GER)	39.170	R11
53	Natalia Czerwonka (POL)	39.275	
54	Stien Vanhoutte (BEL)	39.278	
55	Li Qishi (CHN)	39.322	
56	Carolina Hiller (CAN)	39.385	
57	Bianca Stanica (ROU)	39.559	
58	Natalia Jabrzyk (POL)	39.610	
59	Anna Ostlender (GER)	39.642	
60	Vera Güntert (SUI)	39.687	

=== Women's 1000m ===
The top 10 athletes not qualified through the point ranking, with a maximum of 2 per NOC, will earn a quota for their country. The top 8 unqualified athletes, including athletes who could not qualify through the time ranking because their NOC already has 2 quotas, will form the reserve list. Three quotas from the reserve list were available, green shading indicates acceptance

After all 4 races

Pos.	Racer	Best Time	Note
1	Miho Takagi (JPN)	1:11.834	PQ
2	Jutta Leerdam (NED)	1:12.254	PQ
3	Nao Kodaira (JPN)	1:12.510	PQ
4	Brittany Bowe (USA)	1:12.543	PQ
5	Angelina Golikova (ROC)	1:12.777	PQ
6	Femke Kok (NED)	1:12.878	PQ
7	Daria Kachanova (ROC)	1:12.915	PQ
8	Kimi Goetz (USA)	1:12.992	PQ
9	Olga Fatkulina (ROC)	1:13.013	
10	Li Qishi (CHN)	1:13.272	PQ
11	Ireen Wüst (NED)	1:13.393	PQ
12	Huang Yu-ting (TPE)	1:13.448	PQ
13	Elizaveta Golubeva (ROC)	1:13.454	PQ
14	Yekaterina Aydova (KAZ)	1:13.467	PQ
15	Nikola Zdráhalová (CZE)	1:13.836	PQ
16	Rio Yamada (JPN)	1:13.926	R6
17	Lotte van Beek (NED)	1:13.931	
18	Andzelika Wójcik (POL)	1:14.091	PQ
19	Jin Jingzhu (CHN)	1:14.112	PQ
20	Ragne Wiklund (NOR)	1:14.118	Q
21	Kim Min-sun (KOR)	1:14.162	PQ
22	Yin Qi (CHN)	1:14.432	
23	Vanessa Herzog (AUT)	1:14.465	Q
24	Karolina Bosiek (POL)	1:14.564	PQ
25	Maddison Pearman (CAN)	1:14.674	Q
26	Han Mei (CHN)	1:14.697	PQ
27	Natalia Czerwonka (POL)	1:14.861	R7
28	Letitia de Jong (NED)	1:14.869	
29	Kaja Ziomek (POL)	1:14.885	
30	Hanna Nifantava (BLR)	1:14.921	Q
31	Nadezhda Morozova (KAZ)	1:14.925	Q
32	Marrit Fledderus (NED)	1:14.954	
33	Ekaterina Sloeva (BLR)	1:15.072	Q
34	Tian Ruining (CHN)	1:15.161	
35	Valérie Maltais (CAN)	1:15.222	Q
36	Elizaveta Agafoshina (ROC)	1:15.271	
37	Alexa Scott (CAN)	1:15.293	R8
38	Brianna Bocox (USA)	1:15.332	R9
39	Dione Voskamp (NED)	1:15.371	
40	Kaylin Irvine (CAN)	1:15.436	
41	Kako Yamane (JPN)	1:15.466	
42	Kim Hyun-yung (KOR)	1:15.596	PQ
43	Lea-Sophie Scholz (GER)	1:15.696	R1
44	Kaitlyn McGregor (SUI)	1:15.783	R2
45	Ellia Smeding (GBR)	1:15.816	R3
46	Erin Jackson (USA)	1:15.847	
47	Park Ji-woo (KOR)	1:15.922	R10
48	Martine Ripsrud (NOR)	1:16.174	R11
49	Mihaela Hogas (ROU)	1:16.195	R4
50	Sandrine Tas (BEL)	1:16.467	R5
51	Antoinette de Jong (NED)	1:16.504	
52	Femke Beuling (NED)	1:16.558	
53	Maki Tsuji (JPN)	1:16.587	
54	Natalia Jabrzyk (POL)	1:16.639	
55	Rin Kosaka (JPN)	1:16.719	
56	Nana Takagi (JPN)	1:16.811	
57	Maria Victoria Rodriguez (ARG)	1:16.995	
58	Julie Nistad Samsonsen (NOR)	1:17.099	
59	Brooklyn McDougall (CAN)	1:17.255	
60	Sophie Warmuth (GER)	1:17.387	

=== Women's 1500m ===
The top 10 athletes not qualified through the point ranking, with a maximum of 2 per NOC, will earn a quota for their country. The top 8 unqualified athletes, including athletes who could not qualify through the time ranking because their NOC already has 2 quotas, will form the reserve list. Three quotas from the reserve list were available, green shading indicates acceptance

After all 4 races

Pos.	Racer	Best Time	Note
1	Miho Takagi (JPN)	1:49.990	PQ
2	Ayano Sato (JPN)	1:51.468	PQ
3	Antoinette de Jong (NED)	1:51.722	PQ
4	Brittany Bowe (USA)	1:52.054	PQ
5	Nana Takagi (JPN)	1:52.063	PQ
6	Ireen Wüst (NED)	1:52.105	PQ
7	Elizaveta Golubeva (ROC)	1:52.109	PQ
8	Irene Schouten (NED)	1:52.128	PQ
9	Francesca Lollobrigida (ITA)	1:52.238	PQ
10	Nadezhda Morozova (KAZ)	1:52.418	PQ
11	Ragne Wiklund (NOR)	1:52.476	PQ
12	Nao Kodaira (JPN)	1:52.670	
13	Misaki Oshigiri (JPN)	1:53.029	
14	Han Mei (CHN)	1:53.095	PQ
15	Ivanie Blondin (CAN)	1:53.096	PQ
16	Evgeniia Lalenkova (ROC)	1:53.291	R4
17	Nikola Zdráhalová (CZE)	1:53.476	PQ
18	Joy Beune (NED)	1:53.505	
19	Lotte van Beek (NED)	1:53.894	
20	Isabelle Weidemann (CAN)	1:54.026	PQ
21	Li Qishi (CHN)	1:54.073	PQ
22	Yin Qi (CHN)	1:54.263	PQ
23	Marijke Groenewoud (NED)	1:54.505	
24	Kimi Goetz (USA)	1:54.533	Q
25	Natalia Czerwonka (POL)	1:54.688	PQ
26	Yekaterina Aydova (KAZ)	1:54.697	PQ
27	Elena Eranina (ROC)	1:54.756	PQ
28	Maddison Pearman (CAN)	1:54.989	R5
29	Jorien ter Mors (NED)	1:55.071	
30	Ekaterina Sloeva (BLR)	1:55.092	Q
31	Mia Kilburg-Manganello (USA)	1:55.334	R6
32	Alexa Scott (CAN)	1:55.348	
33	Valérie Maltais (CAN)	1:55.375	
34	Reina Anema (NED)	1:56.117	
35	Leia Behlau (GER)	1:56.171	Q
36	Tao Jiaying (CHN)	1:56.250	
37	Elena Sokhryakova (ROC)	1:56.374	
38	Karolina Bosiek (POL)	1:56.455	Q
39	Daria Kachanova (ROC)	1:56.670	
40	Ahena Er Adake (CHN)	1:56.935	
41	Rin Kosaka (JPN)	1:57.102	
42	Marina Zueva (BLR)	1:57.160	Q
43	Huang Yu-ting (TPE)	1:57.176	Q
44	Sofie Karoline Haugen (NOR)	1:57.279	Q
45	Kaitlyn McGregor (SUI)	1:57.420	R1
46	Ellia Smeding (GBR)	1:57.624	R2
47	Momoka Horikawa (JPN)	1:57.890	
48	Michelle Uhrig (GER)	1:58.136	R7
49	Lea-Sophie Scholz (GER)	1:58.204	R8
50	Brianna Bocox (USA)	1:58.302	
51	Sandrine Tas (BEL)	1:58.559	R3
52	Anastasiia Grigoreva (ROC)	1:58.701	
53	Magdalena Czyszczon (POL)	1:58.905	R9
54	Noemi Bonazza (ITA)	1:59.098	R10
55	Zuzana Kursová (CZE)	1:59.802	R11
56	Sanne in 't Hof (NED)	1:59.946	
57	Stien Vanhoutte (BEL)	1:59.953	
58	Marit Fjellanger Bøhm (NOR)	2:00.750	
59	Park Ji-woo (KOR)	2:00.831	
60	Natalie Kerschbaummayr (AUT)	2:01.286	

=== Women's 3000m ===
The top 6 athletes not qualified through the point ranking, with a maximum of 2 per NOC, will earn a quota for their country. The top 8 unqualified athletes, including athletes who could not qualify through the time ranking because their NOC already has 2 quotas, will form the reserve list. Two quotas from the reserve list were available, green shading indicates acceptance

After all 3 races

Pos.	Racer	Best Time	Note
1	Irene Schouten (NED)	3:52.899	PQ
2	Francesca Lollobrigida (ITA)	3:54.437	PQ
3	Antoinette de Jong (NED)	3:55.194	PQ
4	Isabelle Weidemann (CAN)	3:55.334	PQ
5	Miho Takagi (JPN)	3:55.450	R4
6	Martina Sáblíková (CZE)	3:55.500	PQ
7	Ragne Wiklund (NOR)	3:55.519	PQ
8	Ivanie Blondin (CAN)	3:56.887	PQ
9	Joy Beune (NED)	3:57.093	PQ
10	Nana Takagi (JPN)	3:57.812	
11	Evgeniia Lalenkova (ROC)	3:57.876	Q
12	Han Mei (CHN)	3:58.760	PQ
13	Natalya Voronina (ROC)	3:59.032	PQ
14	Valérie Maltais (CAN)	3:59.223	PQ
15	Marina Zueva (BLR)	3:59.228	PQ
16	Nadezhda Morozova (KAZ)	3:59.647	Q
17	Nikola Zdráhalová (CZE)	3:59.664	Q
18	Ayano Sato (JPN)	3:59.795	PQ
19	Carlijn Achtereekte (NED)	4:00.381	
20	Misaki Oshigiri (JPN)	4:00.948	PQ
21	Sanne in 't Hof (NED)	4:01.671	
22	Elena Sokhryakova (ROC)	4:02.321	R5
23	Sofie Karoline Haugen (NOR)	4:02.662	R6
24	Mia Kilburg-Manganello (USA)	4:02.914	R1
25	Claudia Pechstein (GER)	4:03.695	R2
26	Ahena Er Adake (CHN)	4:04.147	QH
27	Natalia Czerwonka (POL)	4:04.222	R3
28	Ekaterina Sloeva (BLR)	4:04.685	R7
29	Momoka Horikawa (JPN)	4:04.751	
30	Reina Anema (NED)	4:05.239	
31	Magdalena Czyszczon (POL)	4:05.328	R8
32	Noemi Bonazza (ITA)	4:05.967	R9
33	Leia Behlau (GER)	4:06.185	R10
34	Yin Qi (CHN)	4:06.609	
35	Marit Fjellanger Bøhm (NOR)	4:06.692	
36	Dessie Weigel (USA)	4:06.857	
37	Nene Sakai (JPN)	4:07.448	
38	Tao Jiaying (CHN)	4:08.423	
39	Anastasiia Grigoreva (ROC)	4:08.434	
40	Alexa Scott (CAN)	4:08.474	

=== Women's 5000m ===
The top 4 athletes not qualified through the point ranking, with a maximum of 2 per NOC, will earn a quota for their country. The top 8 unqualified athletes will form the reserve list.

After the only race has been held

Pos.	Racer	Best Time	Note
1	Irene Schouten (NED)	6:52.837	PQ
2	Isabelle Weidemann (CAN)	6:54.953	PQ
3	Ragne Wiklund (NOR)	6:56.469	PQ
4	Martina Sáblíková (CZE)	7:00.794	PQ
5	Carlijn Achtereekte (NED)	7:01.913	
6	Ivanie Blondin (CAN)	7:02.978	PQ
7	Sanne in 't Hof (NED)	7:03.852	
8	Francesca Lollobrigida (ITA)	7:04.956	PQ
9	Antoinette de Jong (NED)	7:05.235	
10	Natalya Voronina (ROC)	7:06.634	PQ
11	Valérie Maltais (CAN)	7:07.489	
12	Miho Takagi (JPN)	7:07.809	Q
13	Misaki Oshigiri (JPN)	7:08.052	Q
14	Marina Zueva (BLR)	7:09.102	Q
15	Han Mei (CHN)	7:09.580	Q
16	Joy Beune (NED)	7:10.378	PQ
17	Magdalena Czyszczon (POL)	7:10.456	R1
18	Claudia Pechstein (GER)	7:10.778	R2
19	Nadezhda Morozova (KAZ)	7:11.062	R3
20	Momoka Horikawa (JPN)	7:11.278	
21	Nikola Zdráhalová (CZE)	7:12.898	R5
22	Ahena Er Adake (CHN)	7:12.969	R6
23	Nene Sakai (JPN)	7:14.462	
24	Ayano Sato (JPN)	7:15.439	
25	Elena Sokhryakova (ROC)	7:16.124	R7
26	Sofie Karoline Haugen (NOR)	7:18.945	R8
27	Elena Eranina (ROC)	7:22.278	
28	Maria Lamb (USA)	7:24.881	R4
29	Tao Jiaying (CHN)	7:26.035	
30	Michelle Uhrig (GER)	7:28.214	
31	Josie Hofmann (GER)	7:30.613	
32	Jamie Jurak (USA)	7:34.334	
33	Anna Kovaleva (BLR)	7:36.154	
34	Victoria Stirnemann (GER)	7:37.357	
35	Kim Bo-reum (KOR)	7:37.709	

=== Women's Team pursuit ===
The top 2 nations not qualified through the point ranking will earn a quota. The top 3 unqualified nations will form the reserve list.

After all 3 races

Pos.	Country	Best Time	Note
1	Canada	2:52.067	PQ
2	Netherlands	2:52.692	PQ
3	Japan	2:52.892	PQ
4	ROC	2:56.220	PQ
5	Norway	2:56.794	PQ
6	Poland	2:58.263	PQ
7	China	2:58.310	Q
8	Belarus	2:58.601	Q
9	Germany	3:02.068	R1
10	Switzerland	3:03.666	R2
11	United States	3:07.503	R3
