= 2022 European Speed Skating Championships – Men's 500 metres =

Men's 500 metres at the 2022 European Speed Skating Championships
- Venue: Thialf
- Location: Heerenveen, Netherlands
- Dates: 9 January
- Competitors: 20 from 9 nations
- Winning time: 34.60

Medalists
| gold medal | Piotr Michalski | Poland |
| silver medal | Merijn Scheperkamp | Netherlands |
| bronze medal | Dai Dai N'tab | Netherlands |

The men's 500 metres competition at the 2022 European Speed Skating Championships was held on 9 January 2022.

== Results ==
The race was started at 16:05.

| Rank | Pair | Lane | Name | Country | Time | Diff |
|---|---|---|---|---|---|---|
| 1st place, gold medalist(s) | 10 | o | Piotr Michalski | Poland | 34.60 | |
| 2nd place, silver medalist(s) | 6 | i | Merijn Scheperkamp | Netherlands | 34.61 | +0.01 |
| 3rd place, bronze medalist(s) | 6 | o | Dai Dai N'tab | Netherlands | 34.764 | +0.16 |
| 4 | 10 | i | Kai Verbij | Netherlands | 34.769 | +0.16 |
| 5 | 9 | o | Ignat Golovatsiuk | Belarus | 34.83 | +0.23 |
| 6 | 7 | i | Bjørn Magnussen | Norway | 34.85 | +0.25 |
| 7 | 5 | o | Joel Dufter | Germany | 34.95 | +0.35 |
| 8 | 9 | i | Marek Kania | Poland | 35.07 | +0.47 |
| 9 | 5 | i | Jeffrey Rosanelli | Italy | 35.11 | +0.51 |
| 10 | 7 | o | David Bosa | Italy | 35.13 | +0.53 |
| 11 | 3 | i | Henrik Fagerli Rukke | Norway | 35.20 | +0.60 |
| 12 | 8 | i | Damian Żurek | Poland | 35.30 | +0.70 |
| 13 | 4 | o | Nico Ihle | Germany | 35.53 | +0.93 |
| 14 | 3 | o | Timur Karamov | Russia | 35.58 | +0.98 |
| 15 | 4 | i | Mirko Giacomo Nenzi | Italy | 35.63 | +1.03 |
| 16 | 1 | o | Victor Lobas | Russia | 35.68 | +1.08 |
| 17 | 2 | i | Daniil Beliaev | Russia | 35.98 | +1.38 |
| 18 | 2 | o | Ignaz Gschwentner | Austria | 36.79 | +2.19 |
| 19 | 1 | i | Oliver Grob | Switzerland | 37.01 | +2.41 |
| | 8 | o | Håvard Holmefjord Lorentzen | Norway | Disqualified | |
