= 2023 World Single Distances Speed Skating Championships – Men's team sprint =

Men's team sprint at the 2023 World Single Distances Speed Skating Championships
- Venue: Thialf
- Location: Heerenveen, Netherlands
- Dates: 2 March
- Competitors: 24 from 8 nations
- Teams: 8
- Winning time: 1:19.26

Medalists
gold medal	Christopher Fiola; Laurent Dubreuil; Antoine Gélinas-Beaulieu	Canada
silver medal	Merijn Scheperkamp; Hein Otterspeer; Wesly Dijs	Netherlands
bronze medal	Bjørn Magnussen; Henrik Fagerli Rukke; Håvard Holmefjord Lorentzen	Norway

The Men's team sprint competition at the 2023 World Single Distances Speed Skating Championships was held on 2 March 2023.

== Results ==
The race was started at 21:42.

Rank	Pair	Lane	Country	Time	Diff
1st place, gold medalist(s)	3	c	Canada; Christopher Fiola; Laurent Dubreuil; Antoine Gélinas-Beaulieu	1:19.26	
2nd place, silver medalist(s)	4	c	Netherlands; Merijn Scheperkamp; Hein Otterspeer; Wesly Dijs	1:19.67	+0.41
3rd place, bronze medalist(s)	4	s	Norway; Bjørn Magnussen; Henrik Fagerli Rukke; Håvard Holmefjord Lorentzen	1:19.80	+0.54
4	3	s	Poland; Marek Kania; Piotr Michalski; Damian Żurek	1:20.21	+0.95
5	1	c	Germany; Niklas Kurzmann; Hendrik Dombek; Moritz Klein	1:21.01	+1.75
6	1	s	United States; Cooper McLeod; Austin Kleba; Conor McDermott-Mostowy	1:21.02	+1.76
7	2	c	Kazakhstan; Alexandr Klenko; Artur Galiyev; Dmitry Morozov	1:22.90	+3.64
	2	s	China; Wang Shiwei; Lian Ziwen; Ning Zhongyan	Did not finish	
