= 2024 World Single Distances Speed Skating Championships – Men's team sprint =

Men's team sprint at the 2024 World Single Distances Speed Skating Championships
- Venue: Olympic Oval
- Location: Calgary, Canada
- Dates: February 15
- Competitors: 24 from 8 nations
- Teams: 8
- Winning time: 1:17.17

Medalists
gold medal	Anders Johnson; Laurent Dubreuil; Antoine Gélinas-Beaulieu	Canada
silver medal	Janno Botman; Jenning de Boo; Tim Prins	Netherlands
bronze medal	Henrik Fagerli Rukke; Bjørn Magnussen; Håvard Holmefjord Lorentzen	Norway

The Men's team sprint competition at the 2024 World Single Distances Speed Skating Championships was held on February 15, 2024 in Calgary, Canada.

== Results ==
The race started at 15:44.

Rank	Pair	Lane	Country	Time	Diff
1st place, gold medalist(s)	2	o	Canada; Anders Johnson; Laurent Dubreuil; Antoine Gélinas-Beaulieu	1:17.173; WR	
2nd place, silver medalist(s)	1	o	Netherlands; Janno Botman; Jenning de Boo; Tim Prins	1:17.175	+0.00
3rd place, bronze medalist(s)	2	i	Norway; Henrik Fagerli Rukke; Bjørn Magnussen; Håvard Holmefjord Lorentzen	1:17.31	+0.14
4	3	o	China; Deng Zhihan; Du Haonan; Ning Zhongyan	1:17.32	+0.15
5	4	o	Poland; Marek Kania; Piotr Michalski; Damian Żurek	1:17.37	+0.20
6	3	i	United States; Austin Kleba; Cooper McLeod; Zach Stoppelmoor	1:17.40	+0.23
7	4	i	Germany; Moritz Klein; Stefan Emele; Hendrik Dombek	1:18.80	+1.63
8	1	i	South Korea; Kim Jun-ho; Kim Tae-yun; Cho Sang-hyeok	1:19.61	+2.44
