= 2026 European Speed Skating Championships – Men's 500 metres =

Men's 500 metres at the 2026 European Speed Skating Championships
- Venue: Ice Arena
- Location: Tomaszów Mazowiecki, Poland
- Dates: 11 January
- Competitors: 20 from 12 nations
- Winning time: 34.52

Medalists
gold medal	Damian Zurek	Poland
silver medal	Marek Kania	Poland
bronze medal	Bjørn Magnussen	Norway

The men's 500 metres competition at the 2026 European Speed Skating Championships was held on 11 January 2024. Damian Zurek from Poland won his second gold medal of the championships.

== Results ==
The race started at 15:48.

Rank	Pair	Lane	Name	Country	Time	Diff
1st place, gold medalist(s)	9	o	Damian Zurek	Poland	34.52	
2nd place, silver medalist(s)	8	o	Marek Kania	Poland	34.82	+0.30
3rd place, bronze medalist(s)	9	i	Bjørn Magnussen	Norway	35.12	+0.60
4	7	i	Merijn Scheperkamp	Netherlands	35.246	+0.72
5	10	o	Marten Liiv	Estonia	35.249	+0.72
6	7	o	Nil Llop	Spain	35.32	+0.80
7	5	i	Jeffrey Rosanelli	Italy	35.45	+0.93
8	1	o	Tim Prins	Netherlands	35.49	+0.97
9	8	i	Piotr Michalski	Poland	35.53	+1.01
10	6	o	Henrik Fagerli Rukke	Norway	35.60	+1.08
11	6	i	Siver Brattgjerd	Norway	35.66	+1.14
12	5	o	David Bosa	Italy	35.81	+1.29
13	2	i	Maximilian Strübe	Germany	35.92	+1.40
14	3	o	Daniel Milagros	Spain	36.02	+1.50
15	2	o	Oliver Grob	Switzerland	36.15	+1.63
16	3	i	Kai in 't Veld	Greece	36.18	+1.66
17	4	o	Ignaz Gschwentner	Austria	36.50	+1.98
18	4	i	Tuukka Suomalainen	Finland	36.78	+2.26
19	1	i	Lukács Soma	Hungary	36.82	+2.30
20	10	i	Stefan Westenbroek	Netherlands	Did not finish	
