= 2020 European Speed Skating Championships – Men's team sprint =

Men's team sprint at the 2020 European Speed Skating Championships
- Venue: Thialf
- Location: Heerenveen, Netherlands
- Dates: 10 January
- Competitors: 18 from 6 nations
- Teams: 6
- Winning time: 1:18.92

Medalists
gold medal	Ruslan Murashov; Viktor Mushtakov; Pavel Kulizhnikov	Russia
silver medal	Bjørn Magnussen; Håvard Holmefjord Lorentzen; Odin By Farstad	Norway
bronze medal	Oliver Grob; Christian Oberbichler; Livio Wenger	Switzerland

The men's team sprint competition at the 2020 European Speed Skating Championships was held on 10 January 2020.

== Results ==
The race was started at 21:38.

Rank	Pair	Lane	Country	Time	Diff
1st place, gold medalist(s)	1	c	Russia; Ruslan Murashov; Viktor Mushtakov; Pavel Kulizhnikov	1:18.92	
2nd place, silver medalist(s)	2	c	Norway; Bjørn Magnussen; Håvard Holmefjord Lorentzen; Odin By Farstad	1:20.18	+1.26
3rd place, bronze medalist(s)	3	c	Switzerland; Oliver Grob; Christian Oberbichler; Livio Wenger	1:21.44	+2.52
4	3	s	Belarus; Yauheni Hahiyeu; Artiom Chaban; Ignat Golovatsiuk	1:21.47	+2.55
5	1	s	Italy; Jeffrey Rosanelli; Mirko Giacomo Nenzi; Alessio Trentini	1:22.60	+3.68
	2	s	Poland; Damian Żurek; Artur Nogal; Sebastian Kłosiński	Disqualified	
