= 2022 European Speed Skating Championships – Men's team sprint =

Men's team sprint at the 2022 European Speed Skating Championships
- Venue: Thialf
- Location: Heerenveen, Netherlands
- Dates: 8 January
- Competitors: 18 from 6 nations
- Teams: 6
- Winning time: 1:19.71

Medalists
gold medal	Merijn Scheperkamp; Kai Verbij; Tijmen Snel	Netherlands
silver medal	Bjørn Magnussen; Henrik Fagerli Rukke; Håvard Holmefjord Lorentzen	Norway
bronze medal	Marek Kania; Damian Żurek; Piotr Michalski	Poland

The men's team sprint competition at the 2022 European Speed Skating Championships was held on 8 January 2022.

== Results ==
The race was started at 14:30.

Rank	Pair	Lane	Country	Time	Diff
1st place, gold medalist(s)	1	s	Netherlands; Merijn Scheperkamp; Kai Verbij; Tijmen Snel	1:19.71	
2nd place, silver medalist(s)	3	c	Norway; Bjørn Magnussen; Henrik Fagerli Rukke; Håvard Holmefjord Lorentzen	1:19.83	+0.12
3rd place, bronze medalist(s)	3	s	Poland; Marek Kania; Damian Żurek; Piotr Michalski	1:20.54	+0.83
4	2	c	Germany; Nico Ihle; Joel Dufter; Moritz Klein	1:20.72	+1.01
5	2	c	Italy; Jeffrey Rosanelli; Mirko Giacomo Nenzi; David Bosa	1:21.10	+1.39
6	2	s	Belarus; Stefan Neumiarzhytski; Artiom Chaban; Ignat Golovatsiuk	1:21.58	+1.87
