= 2024 European Speed Skating Championships – Men's team sprint =

Men's team sprint at the 2024 European Speed Skating Championships
- Venue: Thialf
- Location: Heerenveen, Netherlands
- Dates: 6 January
- Competitors: 15 from 5 nations
- Teams: 5
- Winning time: 1:18.31

Medalists
gold medal	Marek Kania; Piotr Michalski; Damian Żurek	Poland
silver medal	Pål Myhren Kristensen; Bjørn Magnussen; Håvard Holmefjord Lorentzen	Norway
bronze medal	Stefan Westenbroek; Jenning de Boo; Wesly Dijs	Netherlands

The men's team sprint competition at the 2024 European Speed Skating Championships was held on 6 January 2024.

== Results ==
The race was started at 14:30.

Rank	Pair	Lane	Country	Time	Diff
1st place, gold medalist(s)	2	c	Poland; Marek Kania; Piotr Michalski; Damian Żurek	1:18.31	
2nd place, silver medalist(s)	3	c	Norway; Pål Myhren Kristensen; Bjørn Magnussen; Håvard Holmefjord Lorentzen	1:18.81	+0.50
3rd place, bronze medalist(s)	2	s	Netherlands; Stefan Westenbroek; Jenning de Boo; Wesly Dijs	1:20.61	+2.30
4	3	s	Germany; Maximilian Strübe; Moritz Klein; Hendrik Dombek	1:21.27	+2.96
5	1	s	Finland; Tuukka Suomalainen; Juuso Lehtonen; Samuli Suomalainen	1:22.84	+4.53
