= 2022 World Sprint Speed Skating Championships – Men =

Sprint Speed Skating Championship

Men at the 2022 World Sprint Speed Skating Championships
- Venue: Vikingskipet
- Location: Hamar, Norway
- Dates: 3–5 March
- Competitors: 23 from 9 nations
- Winning points: 138.705

Medalists
gold medal	Thomas Krol	Netherlands
silver medal	Kai Verbij	Netherlands
bronze medal	Håvard Holmefjord Lorentzen	Norway

The Men competition at the 2022 World Sprint Speed Skating Championships was held from 3 to 5 March 2022.

== Results ==
=== 500 m ===
The race started on 3 March at 17:59.

Rank	Pair	Lane	Name	Country	Time	Diff
1	10	O	Laurent Dubreuil	Canada	34.58	
2	11	I	Tatsuya Shinhama	Japan	34.71	+0.13
3	8	O	Piotr Michalski	Poland	34.79	+0.21
4	10	I	Kai Verbij	Netherlands	34.83	+0.25
5	8	I	Wataru Morishige	Japan	34.89	+0.31
6	11	O	Jordan Stolz	United States	35.06	+0.48
7	3	I	Thomas Krol	Netherlands	35.10	+0.52
8	6	I	Bjørn Magnussen	Norway	35.12	+0.54
9	9	I	Håvard Holmefjord Lorentzen	Norway	35.24	+0.66
10	4	O	Mirko Giacomo Nenzi	Italy	35.26	+0.68
11	4	I	Jeffrey Rosanelli	Italy	35.27	+0.69
12	9	O	Damian Żurek	Poland	35.29	+0.71
13	7	O	David Bosa	Italy	35.35	+0.77
14	1	I	Tijmen Snel	Netherlands	35.46	+0.88
15	7	I	Henrik Fagerli Rukke	Norway	35.49	+0.91
16	6	O	Marek Kania	Poland	35.66	+1.08
17	5	O	Austin Kleba	United States	35.71	+1.13
18	5	I	Hendrik Dombek	Germany	35.74	+1.16
19	2	O	Nico Ihle	Germany	35.75	+1.17
20	2	I	Moritz Klein	Germany	35.80	+1.22
21	3	O	Denis Kuzin	Kazakhstan	36.19	+1.61

=== 1000 m ===
The race started on 3 March at 19.23.

Rank	Pair	Lane	Name	Country	Time	Diff
1	8	I	Thomas Krol	Netherlands	1:08.16; TR	
2	8	O	Håvard Holmefjord Lorentzen	Norway	1:08.82	+0.66
3	10	I	Laurent Dubreuil	Canada	1:08.85	+0.69
4	11	I	Kai Verbij	Netherlands	1:08.94	+0.78
5	9	I	Jordan Stolz	United States	1:09.52	+1.36
6	6	O	Tijmen Snel	Netherlands	1:09.80	+1.64
7	5	I	Nico Ihle	Germany	1:09.83	+1.67
8	2	O	Tatsuya Shinhama	Japan	1:10.04	+1.88
9	11	O	David Bosa	Italy	1:10.06	+1.90
10	5	O	Henrik Fagerli Rukke	Norway	1:10.13	+1.97
11	10	O	Piotr Michalski	Poland	1:10.35	+2.19
12	4	O	Damian Żurek	Poland	1:10.37	+2.21
13	3	I	Mirko Giacomo Nenzi	Italy	1:10.40	+2.24
14	7	O	Austin Kleba	United States	1:10.49	+2.33
15	7	I	Bjørn Magnussen	Norway	1:10.53	+2.37
16	9	O	Moritz Klein	Germany	1:10.76	+2.60
17	4	I	Hendrik Dombek	Germany	1:10.98	+2.82
18	6	I	Denis Kuzin	Kazakhstan	1:11.31	+3.15
19	3	O	Jeffrey Rosanelli	Italy	1:11.36	+3.20
20	1	I	Wataru Morishige	Japan	1:11.96	+3.80
21	2	I	Marek Kania	Poland	1:12.85	+4.69

=== 500 m ===
The race started on 4 March at 17:58.

Rank	Pair	Lane	Name	Country	Time	Diff
1	3	O	Wataru Morishige	Japan	34.77	
2	7	O	Tatsuya Shinhama	Japan	34.88	+0.11
3	9	I	Piotr Michalski	Poland	34.89	+0.12
4	5	O	Bjørn Magnussen	Norway	34.96	+0.19
5	10	I	Jordan Stolz	United States	35.06	+0.29
6	9	O	Kai Verbij	Netherlands	35.07	+0.30
7	2	O	Jeffrey Rosanelli	Italy	35.24	+0.47
8	10	O	Thomas Krol	Netherlands	35.27	+0.50
9	8	O	Håvard Holmefjord Lorentzen	Norway	35.30	+0.53
10	6	I	Damian Żurek	Poland	35.39	+0.62
11	8	I	David Bosa	Italy	35.41	+0.64
12	6	O	Tijmen Snel	Netherlands	35.44	+0.67
13	4	O	Henrik Fagerli Rukke	Norway	35.46	+0.69
14	1	O	Moritz Klein	Germany	35.50	+0.73
15	4	I	Austin Kleba	United States	35.56	+0.79
16	5	I	Nico Ihle	Germany	35.63	+0.86
17	7	I	Mirko Giacomo Nenzi	Italy	35.67	+0.90
18	1	I	Hendrik Dombek	Germany	35.81	+1.04
19	2	I	Marek Kania	Poland	35.81	+1.04
20	3	I	Denis Kuzin	Kazakhstan	36.02	+1.25
–	–		Laurent Dubreuil	Canada	Withdrawn	

=== 1000 m ===
The race started on 4 March at 19:23.

Rank	Pair	Lane	Name	Country	Time	Diff
1	9	O	Thomas Krol	Netherlands	1:08.51	
2	8	I	Håvard Holmefjord Lorentzen	Norway	1:08.85	+0.34
3	10	O	Kai Verbij	Netherlands	1:08.92	+0.41
4	8	O	Jordan Stolz	United States	1:09.21	+0.70
5	7	I	David Bosa	Italy	1:09.42	+0.91
6	6	O	Wataru Morishige	Japan	1:09.74	+1.23
7	4	O	Nico Ihle	Germany	1:09.77	+1.26
8	5	I	Damian Żurek	Poland	1:09.81	+1.30
9	6	I	Tijmen Snel	Netherlands	1:09.88	+1.37
10	7	O	Bjørn Magnussen	Norway	1:09.91	+1.40
11	4	I	Henrik Fagerli Rukke	Norway	1:09.94	+1.43
12	9	I	Piotr Michalski	Poland	1:10.05	+1.54
13	10	I	Tatsuya Shinhama	Japan	1:10.31	+1.80
14	2	I	Austin Kleba	United States	1:10.58	+2.07
15	1	I	Moritz Klein	Germany	1:10.62	+2.11
16	3	O	Hendrik Dombek	Germany	1:10.79	+2.28
17	2	O	Denis Kuzin	Kazakhstan	1:11.32	+2.81
18	3	I	Jeffrey Rosanelli	Italy	1:11.46	+2.95
19	5	O	Mirko Giacomo Nenzi	Italy	1:11.82	+3.31
–	–		Marek Kania	Poland	Withdrawn	

=== Overall standings ===
After all races.

Rank	Name	Country	500m	1000m	500m	1000m	Points	Diff
1st place, gold medalist(s)	Thomas Krol	Netherlands	35.10	1:08.16	35.27	1:08.51	138.705	
2nd place, silver medalist(s)	Kai Verbij	Netherlands	34.83	1:08.94	35.07	1:08.92	138.830	+0.25
3rd place, bronze medalist(s)	Håvard Holmefjord Lorentzen	Norway	35.24	1:08.82	35.30	1:08.85	139.375	+1.34
4	Jordan Stolz	United States	35.06	1:09.52	35.06	1:09.21	139.485	+1.56
5	Tatsuya Shinhama	Japan	34.71	1:10.04	34.88	1:10.31	139.765	+2.12
6	Piotr Michalski	Poland	34.79	1:10.35	34.89	1:10.05	139.880	+2.35
7	Bjørn Magnussen	Norway	35.12	1:10.53	34.96	1:09.91	140.300	+3.19
8	David Bosa	Italy	35.35	1:10.06	35.41	1:09.42	140.500	+3.59
9	Wataru Morishige	Japan	34.89	1:11.96	34.77	1:09.74	140.510	+3.61
10	Tijmen Snel	Netherlands	35.46	1:09.80	35.44	1:09.88	140.740	+4.07
11	Damian Żurek	Poland	35.29	1:10.37	35.39	1:09.81	140.770	+4.13
12	Henrik Fagerli Rukke	Norway	35.49	1:10.13	35.46	1:09.94	140.985	+4.56
13	Nico Ihle	Germany	35.75	1:09.83	35.63	1:09.77	141.180	+4.95
14	Austin Kleba	United States	35.71	1:10.49	35.56	1:10.58	141.805	+6.20
15	Jeffrey Rosanelli	Italy	35.27	1:11.36	35.24	1:11.46	141.920	+6.43
16	Moritz Klein	Germany	35.80	1:10.76	35.50	1:10.62	141.990	+6.57
17	Mirko Giacomo Nenzi	Italy	35.26	1:10.40	35.67	1:11.82	142.040	+6.67
18	Hendrik Dombek	Germany	35.74	1:10.98	35.81	1:10.79	142.435	+7.46
19	Denis Kuzin	Kazakhstan	36.19	1:11.31	36.02	1:11.32	143.525	+9.64
–	Marek Kania	Poland	35.66	1:12.85	35.81	Withdrawn	Did not finish	
–	Laurent Dubreuil	Canada	34.58	1:08.85	Withdrawn		Did not finish	

== Team sprint ==
Men's team sprint at the 2022 Speed Skating Championships
- Venue: Vikingskipet
- Location: Hamar, Norway
- Dates: 5 March 2022
- Winning time: 1:20.01

Medalists
gold medal	Bjørn Magnussen; Henrik Fagerli Rukke; Håvard Holmefjord Lorentzen	Norway
silver medal	Marek Kania; Piotr Michalski; Damian Żurek	Poland
bronze medal	Merijn Scheperkamp; Kai Verbij; Thomas Krol	Netherlands

The Men's team sprint competition at the 2022 World Sprint Speed Skating Championships was held on 5 March 2022. It was the third edition of a team sprint world championship.

It was the first time that the team sprint event was held during the 2022 World Sprint Speed Skating Championships because there were in 2022 no World Single Distances Speed Skating Championships due to the 2022 Winter Olympics.

=== Qualification ===
Teams qualified via the overall team sprint standings of the 2021–22 ISU Speed Skating World Cup that was made on basis of the only team sprint race in November 2021 in Stavanger, Norway.

=== Results ===
The race started on 5 March at 18:11.

Rank	Pair	Lane	Country	Name	Time	Diff
1st place, gold medalist(s)	3	F	Norway	Bjørn Magnussen; Henrik Fagerli Rukke; Håvard Holmefjord Lorentzen	1:20.01	
2nd place, silver medalist(s)	3	C	Poland	Marek Kania; Piotr Michalski; Damian Żurek	1:20.80	+0.79
3rd place, bronze medalist(s)	1	F	Netherlands	Merijn Scheperkamp; Kai Verbij; Thomas Krol	1:20.81	+0.80
4	2	C	Italy	Mirko Giacomo Nenzi; Jeffrey Rosanelli; David Bosa	1:21.10	+1.09
5	2	F	Germany	Hendrik Dombek; Nico Ihle; Moritz Klein	1:22.52	+2.51
