= 2026 European Speed Skating Championships – Men's team sprint =

Men's team sprint at the 2026 European Speed Skating Championships
- Venue: Ice Arena
- Location: Tomaszów Mazowiecki, Poland
- Dates: 10 January
- Competitors: 18 from 6 nations
- Teams: 6
- Winning time: 1:20.22

Medalists
gold medal	Piotr Michalski; Marek Kania; Szymon Wojtakowski	Poland
silver medal	Stefan Westenbroek; Kayo Vos; Merijn Scheperkamp	Netherlands
bronze medal	Siver Brattgjerd; Henrik Fagerli Rukke; Bjørn Magnussen	Norway

The men's team sprint competition at the 2026 European Speed Skating Championships was held on 10 January 2026.

== Results ==
The race was started at 14:00.

Rank	Pair	Lane	Country	Time	Diff
1st place, gold medalist(s)	2	s	Poland; Piotr Michalski; Marek Kania; Szymon Wojtakowski	1:20.22	
2nd place, silver medalist(s)	3	s	Netherlands; Stefan Westenbroek; Kayo Vos; Merijn Scheperkamp	1:20.24	+0.02
3rd place, bronze medalist(s)	3	c	Norway; Siver Brattgjerd; Henrik Fagerli Rukke; Bjørn Magnussen	1:20.31	+0.09
4	1	s	Germany; Maximilian Strübe; Moritz Klein; Stefan Emele	1:21.90	+1.68
5	2	c	Hungary; Botond Bejczi; Konrád Nagy; Bálint Bödei	1:22.92	+2.70
6	1	c	Finland; Tuukka Suomalainen; Juuso Lehtonen; Alvar Mihonen	1:24.35	+4.13
