= Hol IL =

Sports club in Hol municipality, Norway

Logo.

Hol Idrettslag is a multi-sports club from Hol, Norway.

Established in 1903, it has sections for speed skating, skiing, football, cycling, athletics, orienteering and swimming. Well-known members include Ådne Søndrål, Håvard Bøkko, Christoffer Fagerli Rukke and Hege Bøkko, all of whom are speed skaters.
