= Christoffer Fagerli Rukke =

Norwegian speed skater

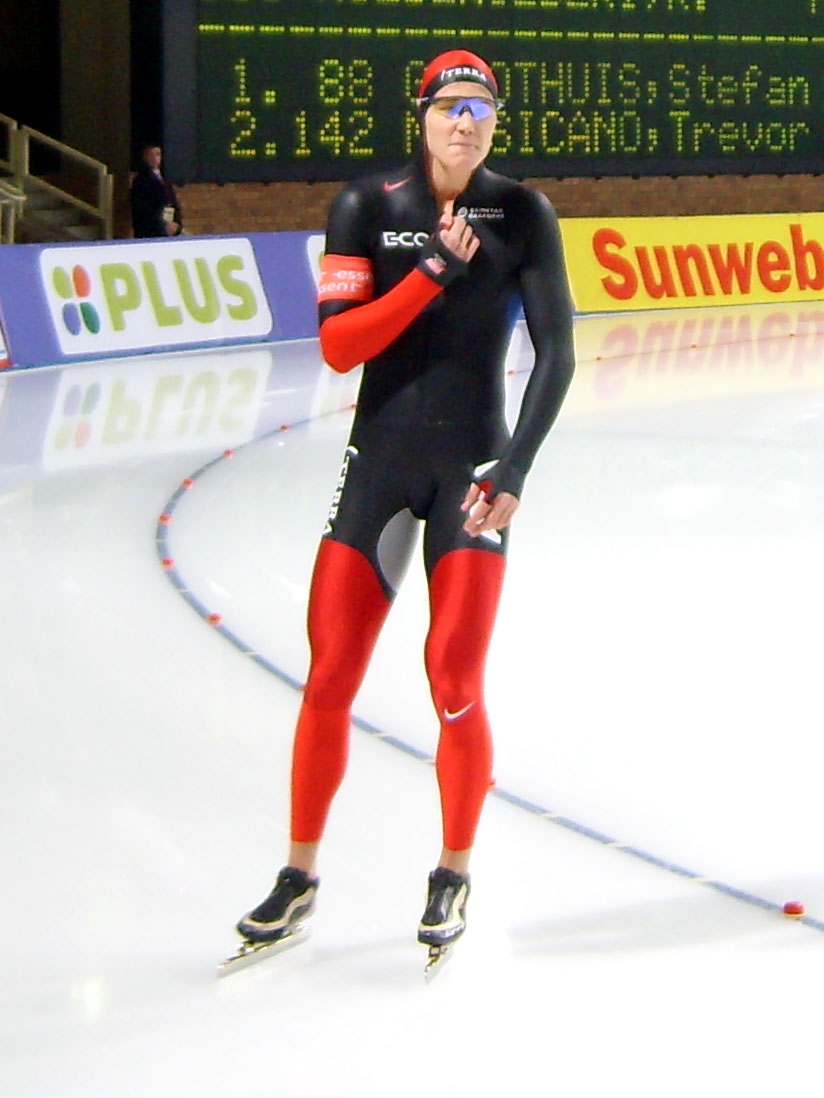
Christoffer Fagerli Rukke

Christoffer Fagerli Rukke (Norwegian: [krɪˈstɔ̀fːər ˈfɑ̂ːɡəlɪ ˈrʉ̂kːə]; born 17 April 1988) is a Norwegian speed-skater who competes for the club Hol IL. He represented Norway at the 2010 Winter Olympics in Vancouver. Before the 2012–13 season, Rukke has started 78 individual races in the World Cup, with 11th place as best three times.
