= Henrik Fagerli Rukke =

Norwegian speed skater (born 1996)

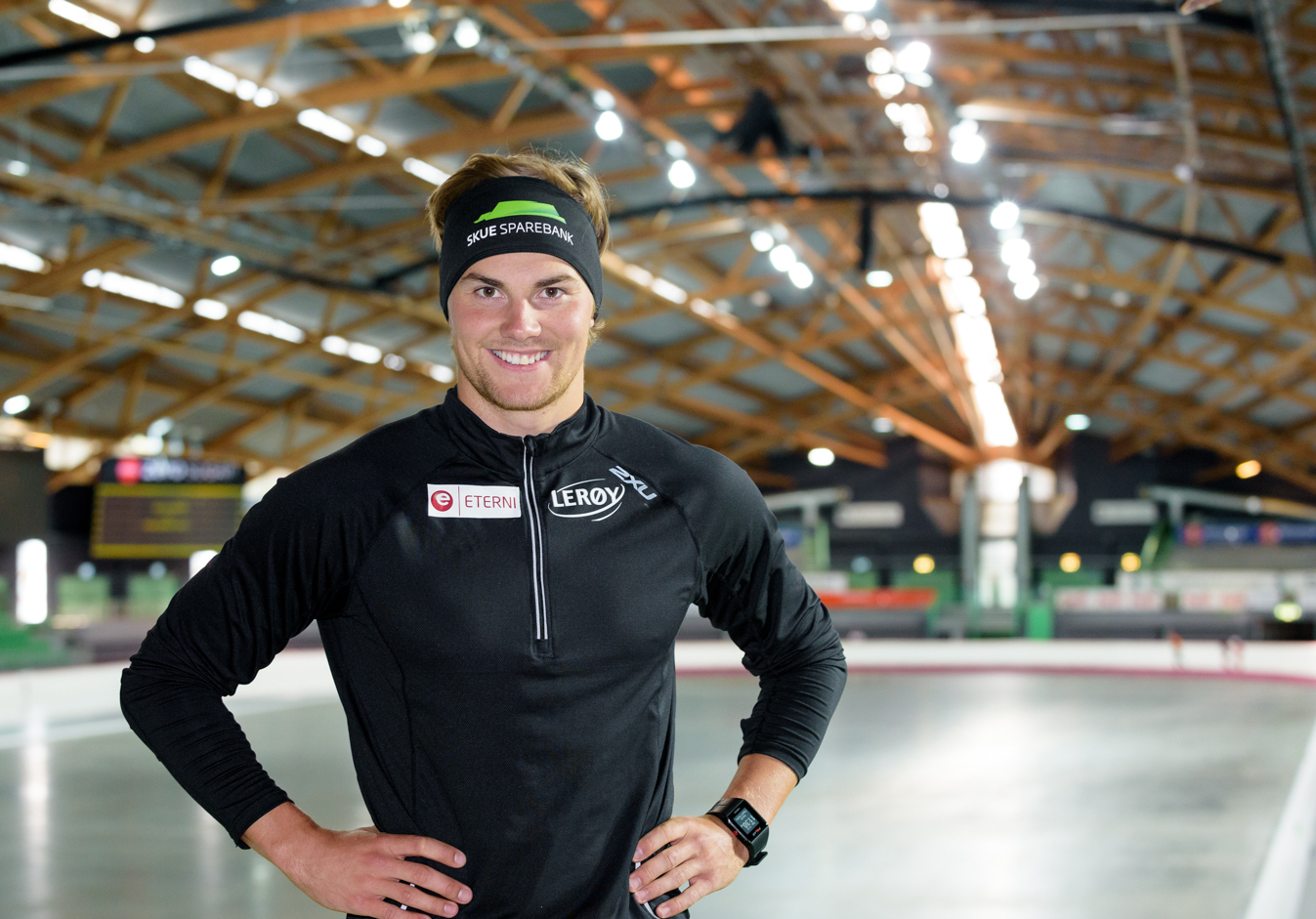

Personal information
- Nationality: Norwegian
- Born: 20 October 1996 (age 29) Hol, Norway
- Height: 1.83 m (6 ft 0 in)
- Weight: 93 kg (205 lb)

Sport
- Country: Norway
- Sport: Speed skating
- Club: Hol IL
Medal record
Men's speed skating
Representing Norway
World Single Distances Championships
Bronze medal – third place	2023 Heerenveen	Team sprint
Bronze medal – third place	2024 Calgary	Team sprint
World Sprint Championships
Gold medal – first place	2022 Hamar	Team sprint
European Championships
Silver medal – second place	2022 Heerenveen	Team sprint
Bronze medal – third place	2019 Collalbo	Sprint
Bronze medal – third place	2026 Tomaszów Mazowiecki	Team sprint

Henrik Fagerli Rukke (born 20 October 1996) is a Norwegian speed-skater who competes internationally.

He has been selected to participate in the 2018 Winter Olympics.

Rukke represents the club Hol IL, and is a brother of speed-skater Christoffer Fagerli Rukke.
