= Håvard Holmefjord Lorentzen =

Norwegian speed skater (born 1992)

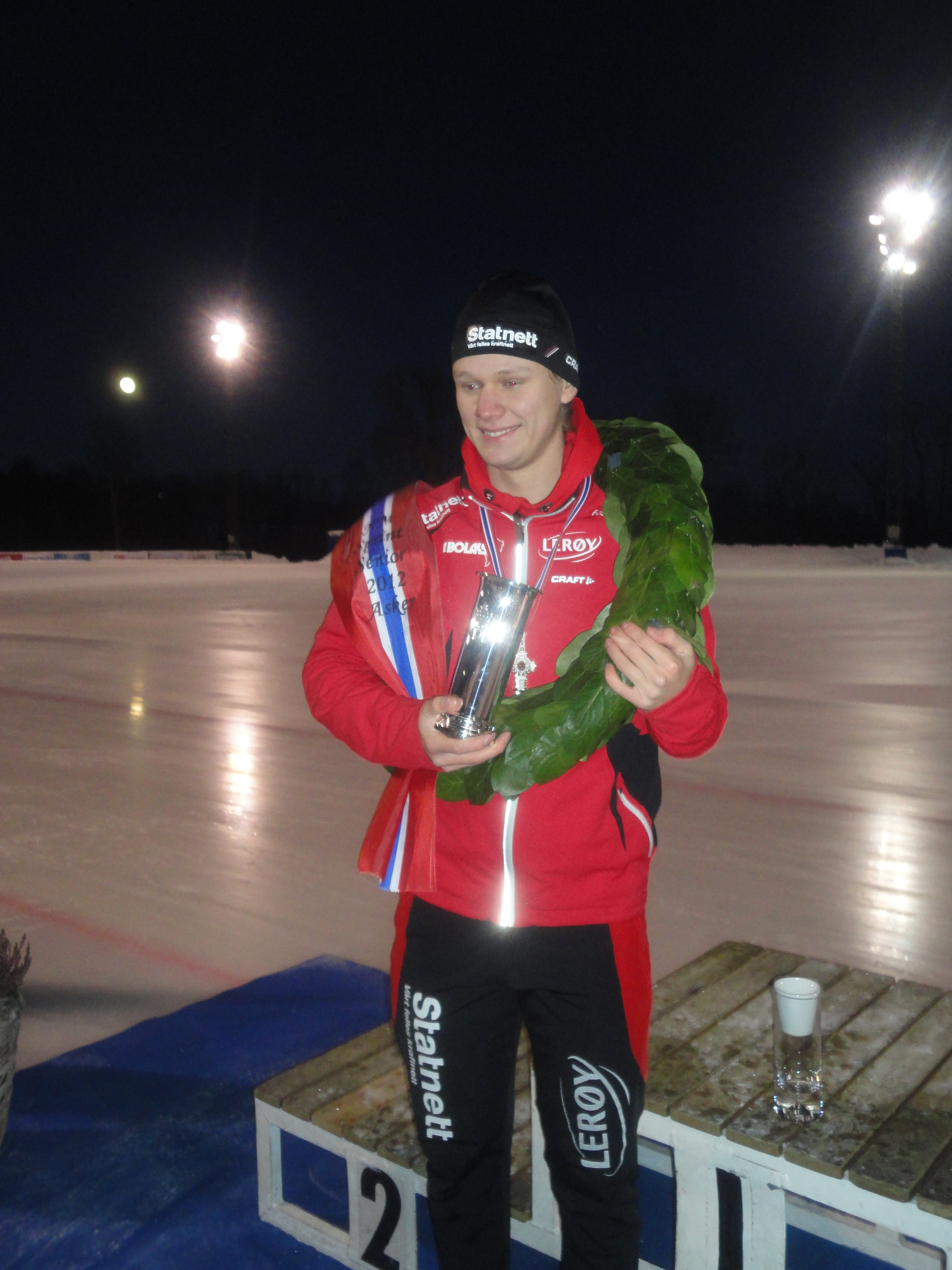
- At the National Sprint Championship 2012 in Asker

Personal information
- Nationality: Norwegian
- Born: 2 October 1992 (age 33) Bergen, Norway
- Height: 1.87 m (6 ft 2 in)

Sport
- Country: Norway
- Sport: Speed skating
- Event(s): 500 m, 1000 m
- Club: Fana IL
Medal record
Men's speed skating
Representing Norway
Olympic Games
Gold medal – first place	2018 Pyeongchang	500 m
Silver medal – second place	2018 Pyeongchang	1000 m
Bronze medal – third place	2022 Beijing	1000 m
World Sprint Championships
Gold medal – first place	2018 Changchun	Sprint
Gold medal – first place	2022 Hamar	Team sprint
Silver medal – second place	2017 Calgary	Sprint
Bronze medal – third place	2022 Hamar	Sprint
World Single Distance Championships
Silver medal – second place	2019 Inzell	500 m
Bronze medal – third place	2020 Salt Lake City	Team sprint
Bronze medal – third place	2023 Heerenveen	Team sprint
Bronze medal – third place	2024 Calgary	Team sprint
European Championships
Silver medal – second place	2019 Collalbo	Sprint
Silver medal – second place	2020 Heerenven	Team sprint
Silver medal – second place	2022 Heerenveen	Team sprint
Silver medal – second place	2024 Heerenveen	Team sprint

Håvard Holmefjord Lorentzen (/^{2}hoːʋɑr ^{2}hɔlməˌfjuːr ^{1}luːrəntsn̩/; born 2 October 1992) is a Norwegian speed skater specialising in the 500, 1000 and 1500 m distances.

== Career ==
Lorentzen has a 9th place from the World Cup races in Heerenveen in December 2011 as his best international senior result, and was awarded the gold medal for the 1000 m for the 2012 World Junior Championships after the original winner Pavel Kulizhnikov was disqualified for a doping offence. Lorentzen represents Fana IL. Football player Håkon Holmefjord Lorentzen is a younger brother of Håvard.

At the 2018 Winter Olympics in Pyeongchang, Lorentzen surpassed expectations by winning the gold medal at the 500 m event and silver in the 1000 m event.

In March 2024, Lorentzen retired from competitions.

== Records ==
=== Personal records ===
Updated January 2023

Personal records
Men's speed skating
Event	Result	Date	Location	Notes
500 m	34.28	10 March 2019	Salt Lake City, United States	NR
1000 m	1:06.51	9 March 2019	Salt Lake City, United States	NR
1500 m	1:44.45	15 November 2013	Salt Lake City, United States	
3000 m	3:49.83	2 November 2013	Salt Lake City, United States	
5000 m	6:39.99	7 November 2010	Hamar, Norway	
10000 m	14.40.65	24 February 2013	Hamar, Norway	

=== World records ===
List of World Records set by Håvard Holmefjord Lorentzen.

Time	Date	Place	Course	Event	Duration
Junior men – Team pursuit (8 laps)
3.54,68	6 March 2010	Berlin	Sportforum Hohenschönhausen	Jr. WC final – 2009/10	Beaten 2 years later
3.50,02	14 March 2010	Moscow	Ice Palace Krylatskoye	Junior-WC 2010	1 year 8 months 6 days
3.47,45	20 November 2011	Chelyabinsk	Uralskaja Molnija	WC nr. 1 – 2011/12	Current record

=== Olympic records ===
List of Olympic Records set by Håvard Holmefjord Lorentzen.

Time	Date	Place	Course	Event	Duration
Senior men – 500 m
34.41	19 February 2018	PyeongChang	Gangneung Oval	Winter Olympics 2018	Current record

== World Cup ==
=== Overall in the World cup ===
Updated after the 2013/14 season.

Season	500 m		1 000 m		1 500 m		5 000 m/10 000 m		Mass start		Team pursuit	
Season	Place	Points	Place	Points	Place	Points	Place	Points	Place	Points	Place	Points
2010/11	–	–	44	8 p	38	14 p	52	2 p	–	–	–	–
2011/12	–	–	19	95 p	24	45 p	–	–	37	0 p	–	–
2012/13	47	0 p	48	9 p	51	0 p	–	–	–	–	–	–
2013/14	49	4 p	10	173 p	20	72 p	–	–	17	10 p	3	270 p
