= Bjørn Magnussen =

Norwegian speed skater (born 1998)

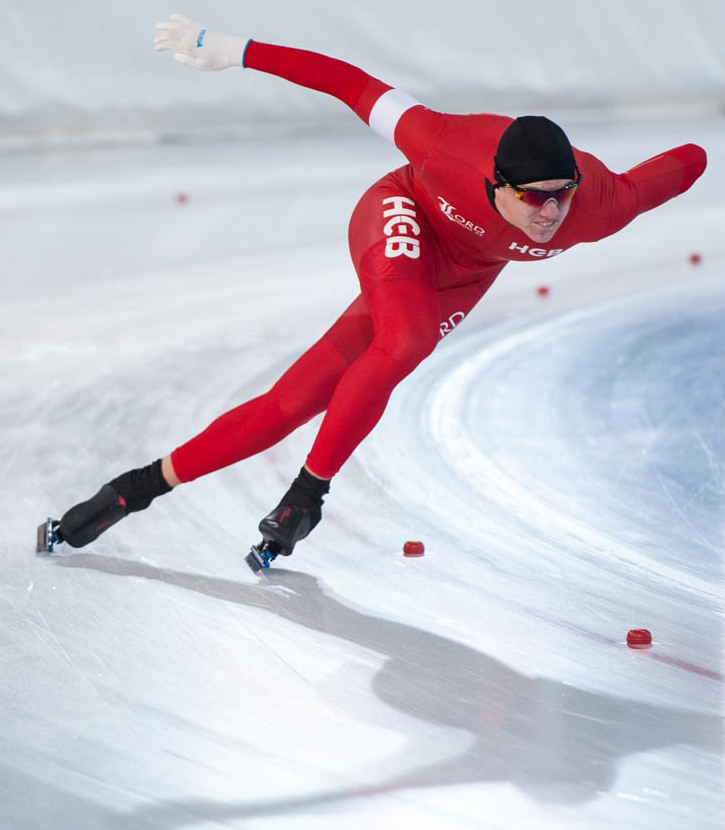

Personal information
- Nationality: Norwegian
- Born: 2 January 1998 (age 28) Trondheim, Norway
- Height: 1.85 m (6 ft 1 in)
- Weight: 86 kg (190 lb)

Sport
- Country: Norway
- Sport: Speed skating
- Event: Sprint
- Club: SK Falken
Medal record
Men's speed skating
Representing Norway
World Single Distances Championships
Bronze medal – third place	2020 Salt Lake City	Team sprint
Bronze medal – third place	2023 Heerenveen	Team sprint
Bronze medal – third place	2024 Calgary	Team sprint
World Sprint Championships
Gold medal – first place	2022 Hamar	Team sprint
European Championships
Silver medal – second place	2020 Heerenveen	Team sprint
Silver medal – second place	2022 Heerenveen	Team sprint
Silver medal – second place	2024 Heerenveen	Team sprint
Bronze medal – third place	2026 Tomaszów Mazowiecki	500 m
Bronze medal – third place	2026 Tomaszów Mazowiecki	Team sprint

Bjørn Magnussen (born 2 January 1998) is a Norwegian speed skater.

== Career ==
He won a medal at the 2020 World Single Distances Speed Skating Championships.
