= Piotr Michalski =

Polish speed skater (born 1994)

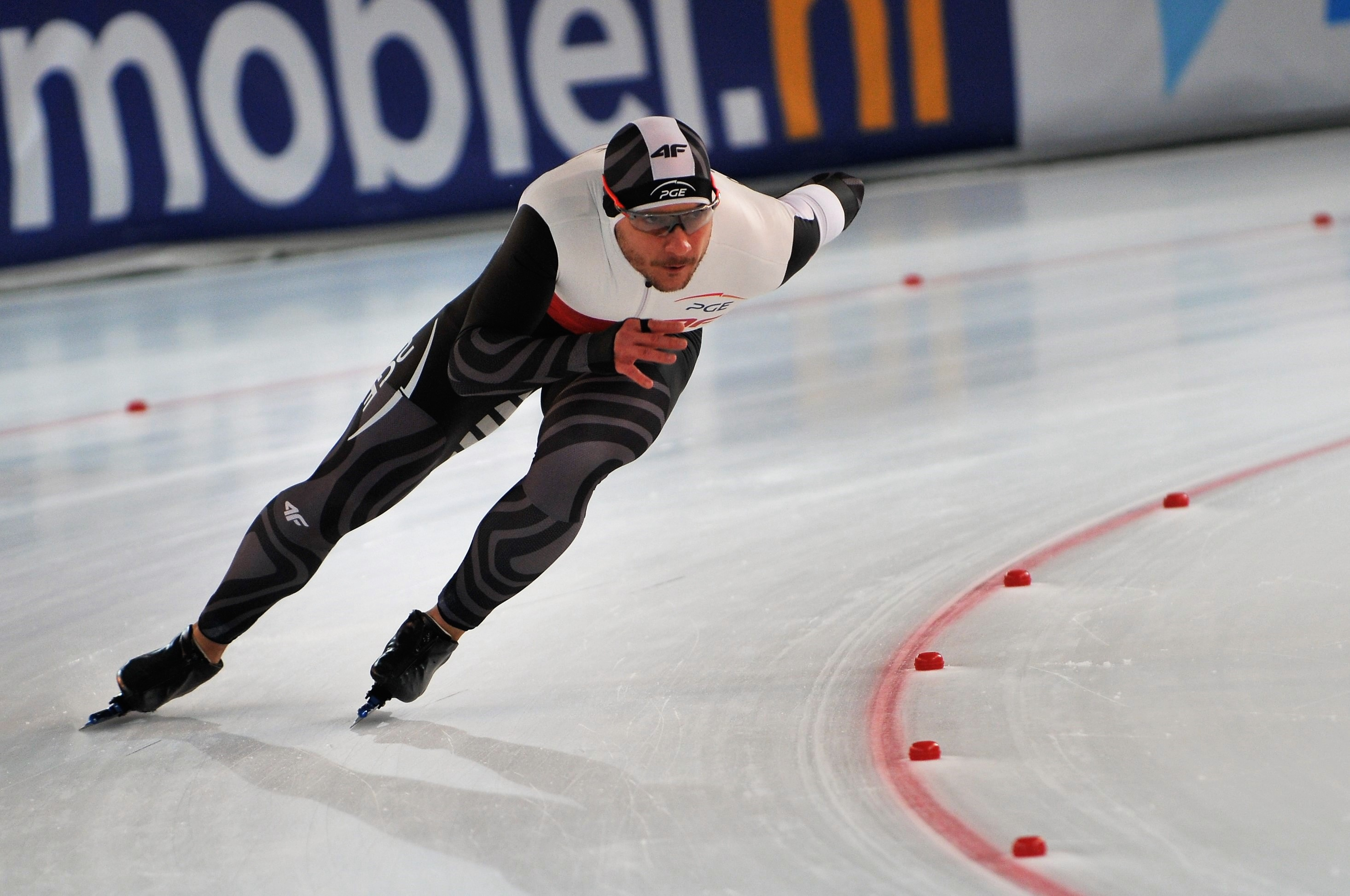

Personal information
- Nationality: Polish
- Born: 27 July 1994 (age 31) Sanok, Poland
- Height: 1.86 m (6 ft 1 in)
- Weight: 83 kg (183 lb)

Sport
- Country: Poland
- Sport: Speed skating
- Club: AZS AWF Katowice
Medal record
Men's speed skating
Representing Poland
World Sprint Championships
Silver medal – second place	2022 Hamar	Team sprint
European Championships
Gold medal – first place	2022 Heerenveen	500 m
Gold medal – first place	2024 Heerenveen	Team sprint
Gold medal – first place	2026 Tomaszów Mazowiecki	Team sprint
Bronze medal – third place	2018 Kolomna	Team sprint
Bronze medal – third place	2022 Heerenveen	Team sprint

Piotr Michalski (born 27 July 1994) is a Polish speed skater.

== Career ==
At the 2016 ISU World Cup in Heerenveen his team, consisting of Artur Nogal and Sebastian Klosinski won the bronze medal in the men Team sprint event. Piotr won the bronze medal in the Team sprint event at the 2018 European Speed Skating Championships in Kolomna together with Artur Nogal and Sebastian Klosinski. He is trained by Tuomas Nieminen, a retired Finnish speed skater.
