= Damian Żurek =

Polish speed skater (born 1999)

Personal information
- Nationality: Polish
- Born: 17 September 1999 (age 26) Tomaszów Mazowiecki, Poland
- Height: 181 cm (5 ft 11 in)

Sport
- Sport: Speed skating
- Event(s): 500 m, 1000 m, team sprint
Medal record
Men's speed skating
Representing Poland
World Single Distance Championships
Bronze medal – third place	2024 Calgary	500 m
World Sprint Championships
Silver medal – second place	2022 Hamar	Team sprint
European Championships
Gold medal – first place	2024 Heerenveen	Team sprint
Gold medal – first place	2026 Tomaszów Mazowiecki	500 m
Gold medal – first place	2026 Tomaszów Mazowiecki	1000 m
Bronze medal – third place	2022 Heerenveen	Team sprint

Damian Żurek (born 17 September 1999) is a Polish speed skater. He represented Poland at the 2022 and 2026 Winter Olympics.

== Career ==
In January 2022, Żurek competed at the 2022 European Speed Skating Championships and won a bronze medal in the team sprint with a time of 1:20.54. He then represented Poland at the 2022 Winter Olympics and finished in 11th place in the 500 metres and 13th place in the 1000 metres. He tested positive for COVID-19 and did not fly with the national team to Beijing.

In January 2024, he competed at the 2024 European Speed Skating Championships and won a gold medal in the team sprint event with a time of 1:18.31. The next month he competed at the 2024 World Single Distances Speed Skating Championships and won a bronze medal in the 500 metres with a Polish record time of 34.11 seconds.
