= 2010–11 ISU Speed Skating World Cup – Men's 1500 metres =

The 1500 metres distance for men in the 2010–11 ISU Speed Skating World Cup was contested over six races on six occasions, out of a total of eight World Cup occasions for the season, with the first occasion taking place in Heerenveen, Netherlands, on 12–14 November 2010, and the final occasion also taking place in Heerenveen on 4–6 March 2011.

Shani Davis of the United States successfully defended his title, while Håvard Bøkko of Norway repeated his second place from the previous season, and Stefan Groothuis of the Netherlands came third.

== Top three ==
Medal	Athlete	Points	Previous season
Gold	(United States) Shani Davis	440	1st
Silver	(Norway) Håvard Bøkko	357	2nd
Bronze	(Netherlands) Stefan Groothuis	342	6th

== Race medallists ==
Occasion #	Location	Date	Gold	Time	Silver	Time	Bronze	Time	Report
1	Heerenveen, Netherlands	13 November	Shani Davis; United States	1:45.04	Simon Kuipers; Netherlands	1:45.48	Mark Tuitert; Netherlands	1:45.95	
2	Berlin, Germany	20 November	Håvard Bøkko; Norway	1:45.27	Trevor Marsicano; United States	1:46.15	Stefan Groothuis; Netherlands	1:46.31	
3	Hamar, Norway	27 November	Trevor Marsicano; United States	1:45.54	Simon Kuipers; Netherlands	1:45.97	Shani Davis; United States	1:45.98	
6	Moscow, Russia	28 January	Ivan Skobrev; Russia	1:45.49	Denny Morrison; Canada	1:46.25	Mark Tuitert; Netherlands	1:46.59	
7	Salt Lake City, United States	18 February	Trevor Marsicano; United States	1:43.35	Shani Davis; United States	1:43.38	Mark Tuitert; Netherlands	1:43.54	
8	Heerenveen, Netherlands	5 March	Shani Davis; United States	1:45.92	Stefan Groothuis; Netherlands	1:46.09	Ivan Skobrev; Russia	1:46.59	

== Standings ==
Standings as of 6 March 2011 (end of the season).

#	Name	Nat.	HVN1	BER	HAM	MOS	SLC	HVN2	Total
1	Shani Davis	(United States)	100	40	70	–	80	150	440
2	Håvard Bøkko	(Norway)	32	100	50	50	50	75	357
3	Stefan Groothuis	(Netherlands)	60	70	32	60	–	120	342
4	Ivan Skobrev	(Russia)	36	24	60	100	8	105	333
5	Trevor Marsicano	(United States)	21	80	100	–	100	24	325
6	Simon Kuipers	(Netherlands)	80	45	80	40	40	18	303
7	Mark Tuitert	(Netherlands)	70	28	28	70	70	32	298
8	Denny Morrison	(Canada)	2	25	45	80	60	45	257
9	Jonathan Kuck	(United States)	24	36	40	–	–	90	190
10	Mikael Flygind-Larsen	(Norway)	50	21	24	36	45	12	188
11	Lucas Makowsky	(Canada)	28	50	12	28	28	40	186
12	Wouter olde Heuvel	(Netherlands)	45	18	–	45	32	21	161
13	Alexis Contin	(France)	19	60	18	–	24	28	149
14	Rhian Ket	(Netherlands)	16	32	8	–	36	36	128
15	Yevgeny Lalenkov	(Russia)	18	14	21	21	21	14	109
16	Zbigniew Bródka	(Poland)	25	16	16	16	14	8	95
17	Enrico Fabris	(Italy)	40	12	36	–	–	–	88
18	Konrad Niedźwiedzki	(Poland)	3	6	25	12	18	16	80
19	Henrik Christiansen	(Norway)	15	8	14	8	12	10	67
20	Kjeld Nuis	(Netherlands)	–	–	–	32	25	–	57
21	Matteo Anesi	(Italy)	6	0	11	24	10	6	57
22	Pavel Baynov	(Russia)	–	–	2	19	16	4	41
23	Jan Szymański	(Poland)	8	19	6	–	–	5	38
24	Christoffer Fagerli Rukke	(Norway)	–	–	19	14	0	–	33
25	Robert Lehmann	(Germany)	8	0	0	10	15	–	33
26	Philippe Riopel	(Canada)	5	1	8	18	0	–	32
27	Roland Cieslak	(Poland)	–	–	–	25	6	–	31
28	Dmitry Babenko	(Kazakhstan)	10	6	10	–	–	–	26
29	Jörg Dallmann	(Germany)	2	11	0	6	6	–	25
30	Aleksandr Rumyantsev	(Russia)	0	4	0	15	5	–	24
31	Aleksey Yesin	(Russia)	12	10	–	–	–	–	22
32	Denis Kuzin	(Kazakhstan)	–	15	5	–	0	–	20
33	Joel Eriksson	(Sweden)	1	2	6	–	11	–	20
34	Aleksandr Zhigin	(Kazakhstan)	0	–	–	–	19	–	19
35	Lee Jong-woo	(South Korea)	14	5	–	–	–	–	19
36	Koen Verweij	(Netherlands)	–	–	15	–	–	–	15
37	Ryan Bedford	(United States)	4	–	–	11	0	–	15
38	Håvard Holmefjord Lorentzen	(Norway)	6	8	–	–	–	–	14
39	Lee Seung-hoon	(South Korea)	11	–	–	–	–	–	11
40	Justin Warsylewicz	(Canada)	4	0	1	5	1	–	11
41	Shane Dobbin	(New Zealand)	–	–	–	–	8	–	8
41	Vitaly Mikhailov	(Belarus)	0	0	–	8	–	–	8
43	Luca Stefani	(Italy)	–	–	–	6	0	–	6
44	Joshua Wood	(United States)	–	–	–	–	4	–	4
44	Joshua Lose	(Australia)	0	0	0	4	0	–	4
44	Fredrik van der Horst	(Norway)	–	–	4	–	–	–	4
47	Shota Nakamura	(Japan)	0	–	–	–	2	–	2
47	Milan Sáblík	(Czech Republic)	0	0	0	2	–	–	2
49	Christian Pichler	(Austria)	–	–	–	1	0	–	1
49	Mirko Giacomo Nenzi	(Italy)	1	0	0	–	0	–	1
