= 2010–11 ISU Speed Skating World Cup – Men's 5000 and 10000 metres =

The 5000 and 10000 metres distances for men in the 2010–11 ISU Speed Skating World Cup were contested over six races on six occasions, out of a total of eight World Cup occasions for the season, with the first occasion taking place in Heerenveen, Netherlands, on 12–14 November 2010, and the final occasion also taking place in Heerenveen on 4–6 March 2011.

Bob de Jong of the Netherlands won the cup, while Ivan Skobrev of Russia repeated his second place from the previous season, and Bob de Vries of the Netherlands came third. The defending champion, Håvard Bøkko of Norway, came fourth.

== Top three ==
| Medal | Athlete | Points | Previous season |
|---|---|---|---|
| Gold | (Netherlands) Bob de Jong | 610 | 3rd |
| Silver | (Russia) Ivan Skobrev | 400 | 2nd |
| Bronze | (Netherlands) Bob de Vries | 356 | 30th |

== Race medallists ==
| Occasion # | Location | Date | Distance | Gold | Time | Silver | Time | Bronze | Time | Report |
|---|---|---|---|---|---|---|---|---|---|---|
| 1 | Heerenveen, Netherlands | 14 November | 5000 metres | Bob de Jong; Netherlands | 6:17.31 | Ivan Skobrev; Russia | 6:18.96 | Wouter olde Heuvel; Netherlands | 6:20.93 | |
| 2 | Berlin, Germany | 19 November | 5000 metres | Lee Seung-hoon; South Korea | 6:18.40 | Jonathan Kuck; United States | 6:18.85 | Håvard Bøkko; Norway | 6:19.50 | |
| 3 | Hamar, Norway | 28 November | 10000 metres | Bob de Jong; Netherlands | 13:05.83 | Ivan Skobrev; Russia | 13:11.26 | Jorrit Bergsma; Netherlands | 13:13.98 | |
| 6 | Moscow, Russia | 29 January | 5000 metres | Bob de Jong; Netherlands | 6:19.43 | Ivan Skobrev; Russia | 6:21.16 | Håvard Bøkko; Norway | 6:22.79 | |
| 7 | Salt Lake City, United States | 19 February | 10000 metres | Bob de Jong; Netherlands | 12:53.17 | Lee Seung-hoon; South Korea | 12:57.27 | Bob de Vries; Netherlands | 13:01.83 | |
| 8 | Heerenveen, Netherlands | 4 March | 5000 metres | Bob de Jong; Netherlands | 6:18.62 | Ivan Skobrev; Russia | 6:22.50 | Bob de Vries; Netherlands | 6:24.44 | |

== Standings ==
Standings as of 6 March 2011 (end of the season).

| # | Name | Nat. | HVN1 | BER | HAM | MOS | SLC | HVN2 | Total |
|---|---|---|---|---|---|---|---|---|---|
| 1 | Bob de Jong | (Netherlands) | 100 | 60 | 100 | 100 | 100 | 150 | 610 |
| 2 | Ivan Skobrev | (Russia) | 80 | 40 | 80 | 80 | – | 120 | 400 |
| 3 | Bob de Vries | (Netherlands) | 50 | 36 | 50 | 45 | 70 | 105 | 356 |
| 4 | Håvard Bøkko | (Norway) | 36 | 70 | 60 | 70 | 50 | 45 | 331 |
| 5 | Jonathan Kuck | (United States) | 60 | 80 | 45 | – | – | 90 | 275 |
| 6 | Wouter olde Heuvel | (Netherlands) | 70 | 50 | – | 50 | 45 | 40 | 255 |
| 7 | Jorrit Bergsma | (Netherlands) | 32 | 32 | 70 | 0 | 15 | 75 | 224 |
| 8 | Lee Seung-hoon | (South Korea) | 40 | 100 | – | – | 80 | – | 220 |
| 9 | Patrick Beckert | (Germany) | 16 | 16 | 18 | 21 | 60 | 32 | 163 |
| 10 | Øystein Grødum | (Norway) | 24 | 18 | 30 | 32 | 35 | 18 | 157 |
| 11 | Dmitry Babenko | (Kazakhstan) | 28 | 10 | 40 | – | 40 | 28 | 146 |
| 12 | Alexis Contin | (France) | 45 | 45 | 25 | – | – | 24 | 139 |
| 13 | Shane Dobbin | (New Zealand) | 14 | 21 | 35 | – | 30 | 21 | 121 |
| 14 | Jan Szymański | (Poland) | 12 | 8 | 9 | 40 | 20 | 10 | 99 |
| 15 | Henrik Christiansen | (Norway) | 18 | 14 | 30 | 0 | 21 | 16 | 99 |
| 16 | Jan Blokhuijsen | (Netherlands) | – | – | – | 60 | – | 36 | 96 |
| 17 | Norimasa Zaike | (Japan) | 3 | 8 | 8 | 36 | 25 | 5 | 85 |
| 18 | Marco Weber | (Germany) | 0 | 15 | 13 | 24 | 25 | 6 | 83 |
| 19 | Lucas Makowsky | (Canada) | 6 | 25 | 15 | 14 | – | 12 | 72 |
| 20 | Arjen van der Kieft | (Netherlands) | – | – | 35 | – | 35 | – | 70 |
| 21 | Trevor Marsicano | (United States) | 19 | 28 | 20 | – | – | – | 67 |
| 22 | Aleksandr Rumyantsev | (Russia) | 8 | 0 | 25 | 10 | 13 | 8 | 64 |
| 23 | Joshua Lose | (Australia) | 4 | 0 | 0 | 25 | 30 | 4 | 63 |
| 24 | Sverre Lunde Pedersen | (Norway) | – | 19 | – | 28 | – | 14 | 61 |
| 25 | Enrico Fabris | (Italy) | 21 | 24 | – | – | – | – | 45 |
| 26 | Moritz Geisreiter | (Germany) | 6 | 2 | 4 | 12 | 18 | – | 42 |
| 27 | Roger Schneider | (Switzerland) | 15 | 5 | 15 | – | 7 | – | 42 |
| 28 | Fredrik van der Horst | (Norway) | – | – | 11 | 18 | 5 | – | 34 |
| 29 | Sławomir Chmura | (Poland) | 0 | 0 | 5 | 19 | 9 | – | 33 |
| 30 | Ko Byung-wook | (South Korea) | 25 | 6 | – | – | – | – | 31 |
| 31 | Alexej Baumgartner | (Germany) | – | – | – | 15 | 15 | – | 30 |
| 32 | Ryan Bedford | (United States) | 11 | – | – | 16 | 2 | – | 29 |
| 33 | Robert Bovenhuis | (Netherlands) | 10 | 12 | – | – | – | – | 22 |
| 34 | Bart Swings | (Belgium) | – | – | – | 11 | 11 | – | 22 |
| 35 | Ted-Jan Bloemen | (Netherlands) | – | – | 21 | – | – | – | 21 |
| 36 | Justin Warsylewicz | (Canada) | 4 | 0 | 2 | 8 | 0 | – | 14 |
| 37 | Haralds Silovs | (Latvia) | 2 | 11 | – | – | – | – | 13 |
| 38 | Tobias Schneider | (Germany) | – | 6 | 6 | – | – | – | 12 |
| 39 | Artyom Belousov | (Kazakhstan) | 0 | – | 10 | – | 1 | – | 11 |
| 40 | Shota Nakamura | (Japan) | 0 | 0 | 7 | – | 4 | – | 11 |
| 41 | Hiroki Hirako | (Japan) | – | – | – | – | 10 | – | 10 |
| 42 | Jordan Belchos | (Canada) | – | – | – | 8 | – | – | 8 |
| 42 | Shani Davis | (United States) | 8 | – | – | – | – | – | 8 |
| 42 | Patrick Meek | (United States) | – | – | – | – | 8 | – | 8 |
| 45 | Maxim Baklashkin | (Kazakhstan) | – | 0 | – | 6 | – | – | 6 |
| 45 | Pavel Baynov | (Russia) | – | – | – | 0 | 6 | – | 6 |
| 47 | Tore Solli | (Norway) | 5 | 0 | 1 | – | – | – | 6 |
| 48 | Robert Lehmann | (Germany) | 1 | 4 | – | – | – | – | 5 |
| 49 | Andrey Burlyayev | (Russia) | – | – | – | 4 | – | – | 4 |
| 50 | Luca Stefani | (Italy) | 0 | 0 | 0 | 1 | 3 | – | 4 |
| 51 | Lèo Landry | (Canada) | 0 | 0 | 3 | – | 0 | – | 3 |
| 52 | Marco Cignini | (Italy) | 0 | 0 | – | 2 | – | – | 2 |
| 52 | Håvard Holmefjord Lorentzen | (Norway) | 2 | – | – | – | – | – | 2 |
| 54 | Joel Eriksson | (Sweden) | – | 1 | – | – | – | – | 1 |
