= 2010–11 ISU Speed Skating World Cup – Men's 1000 metres =

The 1000 metres distance for men in the 2010–11 ISU Speed Skating World Cup was contested over eight races on six occasions, out of a total of eight World Cup occasions for the season, with the first occasion taking place in Heerenveen, Netherlands, on 12–14 November 2010, and the final occasion also taking place in Heerenveen on 4–6 March 2011.

Stefan Groothuis of the Netherlands won the cup, while Lee Kyou-hyuk of South Korea came second, and the defending champion, Shani Davis of the United States, came third.

== Top three ==
Medal	Athlete	Points	Previous season
Gold	(Netherlands) Stefan Groothuis	580	3rd
Silver	(South Korea) Lee Kyou-hyuk	522	10th
Bronze	(United States) Shani Davis	485	1st

== Race medallists ==
Occasion #	Location	Date	Gold	Time	Silver	Time	Bronze	Time	Report
1	Heerenveen, Netherlands	12 November	Shani Davis; United States	1:08.40	Stefan Groothuis; Netherlands	1:08.51	Simon Kuipers; Netherlands	1:08.68	
2	Berlin, Germany	21 November	Shani Davis; United States	1:08.82	Lee Kyou-hyuk; South Korea	1:09.08	Simon Kuipers; Netherlands	1:09.11	
4	Changchun, China	4 December	Stefan Groothuis; Netherlands	1:09.57	Lee Kyou-hyuk; South Korea	1:10.10	Simon Kuipers; Netherlands	1:10.27	
4	Changchun, China	5 December	Stefan Groothuis; Netherlands	1:09.39	Simon Kuipers; Netherlands	1:10.11	Lee Kyou-hyuk; South Korea	1:10.13	
5	Obihiro, Japan	11 December	Shani Davis; United States	1:09.56	Lee Kyou-hyuk; South Korea	1:09.80	Denny Morrison; Canada	1:10.39	
5	Obihiro, Japan	12 December	Samuel Schwarz; Germany	1:09.98	Shani Davis; United States	1:10.15	Jan Bos; Netherlands	1:10.17	
6	Moscow, Russia	30 January	Stefan Groothuis; Netherlands	1:08.82	Denny Morrison; Canada	1:09.57	Mikael Flygind Larsen; Norway	1:09.65	
8	Heerenveen, Netherlands	6 March	Stefan Groothuis; Netherlands	1:08.66	Lee Kyou-hyuk; South Korea	1:09.00	Shani Davis; United States	1:09.21	

== Standings ==
Standings as of 6 March 2011 (end of the season).

#	Name	Nat.	HVN1	BER	CHA1	CHA2	OBI1	OBI2	MOS	HVN2	Total
1	Stefan Groothuis	(Netherlands)	80	50	100	100	–	–	100	150	580
2	Lee Kyou-hyuk	(South Korea)	32	80	80	70	80	60	–	120	522
3	Shani Davis	(United States)	100	100	–	–	100	80	–	105	485
4	Simon Kuipers	(Netherlands)	70	70	70	80	–	–	40	24	354
5	Denny Morrison	(Canada)	45	32	36	12	70	16	80	45	336
6	Jan Bos	(Netherlands)	24	24	50	40	45	70	36	28	317
7	Samuel Schwarz	(Germany)	36	18	60	21	18	100	21	40	314
8	Mikael Flygind-Larsen	(Norway)	40	60	32	36	24	21	70	16	299
9	Nico Ihle	(Germany)	25	40	28	60	28	36	45	8	270
10	Dmitry Lobkov	(Russia)	14	14	45	45	40	5	–	90	253
11	Aleksey Yesin	(Russia)	16	28	18	28	14	40	60	32	236
12	Denis Kuzin	(Kazakhstan)	–	19	40	50	36	24	–	18	187
13	Hein Otterspeer	(Netherlands)	18	36	24	32	32	28	–	–	170
14	Jamie Gregg	(Canada)	–	–	25	24	21	32	24	21	147
15	Matteo Anesi	(Italy)	–	11	12	18	10	14	50	10	125
16	Lars Elgersma	(Netherlands)	–	–	–	–	60	50	–	–	110
17	Trevor Marsicano	(United States)	60	12	–	–	–	–	–	36	108
18	Philippe Riopel	(Canada)	12	10	21	16	–	–	32	14	105
19	Kjeld Nuis	(Netherlands)	–	–	–	–	–	–	25	75	100
20	Lee Kang-seok	(South Korea)	28	16	0	6	50	–	–	–	100
21	Mark Tuitert	(Netherlands)	50	45	–	–	–	–	–	–	95
22	Sjoerd de Vries	(Netherlands)	–	–	–	–	25	45	5	12	87
23	Yevgeny Lalenkov	(Russia)	21	21	–	–	–	–	28	5	75
24	Richard MacClennan	(Canada)	5	–	15	15	5	8	18	6	72
25	Roman Krech	(Kazakhstan)	8	0	16	14	16	18	–	–	72
26	Aleksandr Lebedev	(Russia)	–	–	6	25	12	12	6	–	61
27	Frank Steiner	(Germany)	8	0	14	10	8	10	–	–	50
28	Ermanno Ioriatti	(Italy)	0	–	8	11	8	11	10	–	48
29	Pim Schipper	(Netherlands)	–	–	–	–	19	25	–	–	44
30	Keiichiro Nagashima	(Japan)	15	6	8	–	15	–	–	–	44
31	Yuji Kamijo	(Japan)	–	–	11	19	6	6	–	–	42
32	Pekka Koskela	(Finland)	0	25	–	–	–	–	16	–	41
33	Aleksey Bondarchuk	(Kazakhstan)	0	1	2	8	11	15	–	–	37
34	Sergey Chadayev	(Russia)	0	6	10	8	0	0	12	–	36
35	Espen-Aarnes Hvammen	(Norway)	0	0	19	2	–	–	14	–	35
36	Mike Blumel	(United States)	2	0	1	4	6	19	–	–	32
37	Ryohei Haga	(Japan)	19	5	6	–	0	–	–	–	30
38	Jörg Dallmann	(Germany)	11	8	–	–	–	–	8	–	27
39	Jonathan Kuck	(United States)	10	15	–	–	–	–	–	–	25
40	Daniel Greig	(Australia)	–	0	–	–	–	–	19	–	19
41	Aleksandr Gluschenko	(Kazakhstan)	–	–	–	–	–	–	15	–	15
42	Mika Poutala	(Finland)	4	–	–	–	–	–	11	–	15
43	Gilmore Junio	(Canada)	0	0	–	–	4	8	–	–	12
44	Tyler Derraugh	(Canada)	–	–	–	–	–	–	8	–	8
44	Håvard Holmefjord Lorentzen	(Norway)	0	8	–	–	–	–	–	–	8
46	Christoffer Fagerli Rukke	(Norway)	0	2	–	–	–	–	6	–	8
46	Junya Miwa	(Japan)	–	–	–	–	2	6	–	–	8
48	Tucker Fredricks	(United States)	–	0	–	6	–	–	–	–	6
48	William Dutton	(Canada)	6	0	0	0	0	–	–	–	6
48	Zbigniew Bródka	(Poland)	6	–	–	–	–	–	–	–	6
51	Wang Nan	(China)	0	0	4	–	1	1	–	–	6
51	Tuomas Nieminen	(Finland)	–	4	–	–	0	2	–	–	6
53	Mitchell Whitmore	(United States)	–	–	–	–	–	–	4	–	4
53	Lee Jong-woo	(South Korea)	4	–	–	–	–	–	–	–	4
53	Muncef Ouardi	(Canada)	–	0	–	–	–	4	–	–	4
56	Mirko Giacomo Nenzi	(Italy)	3	0	–	–	–	–	–	–	3
57	Joey Lindsey	(United States)	–	–	–	–	–	–	2	–	2
57	Joel Eriksson	(Sweden)	2	0	–	–	–	–	–	–	2
59	Maciej Biega	(Poland)	–	0	–	–	–	–	1	–	1
59	Ryan Bedford	(United States)	1	–	–	–	–	–	–	–	1
