= 2010–11 ISU Speed Skating World Cup – Men's 500 metres =

The 500 metres distance for men in the 2010–11 ISU Speed Skating World Cup was contested over 12 races on six occasions, out of a total of eight World Cup occasions for the season, with the first occasion taking place in Heerenveen, Netherlands, on 12–14 November 2010, and the final occasion also taking place in Heerenveen on 4–6 March 2011.

Lee Kang-seok of South Korea won the cup, while his countryman Lee Kyou-hyuk came second, and Joji Kato of Japan came third. Defending champion Tucker Fredricks of the United States finished in 4th place.

== Top three ==
Medal	Athlete	Points	Previous season
Gold	(South Korea) Lee Kang-seok	845	6th
Silver	(South Korea) Lee Kyou-hyuk	745	7th
Bronze	(Japan) Joji Kato	671	9th

== Race medallists ==
Occasion #	Location	Date	Gold	Time	Silver	Time	Bronze	Time	Report
1	Heerenveen, Netherlands	12 November	Joji Kato; Japan	34.85	Lee Kang-seok; South Korea	35.00	Lee Kyou-hyuk; South Korea	35.01	
1	Heerenveen, Netherlands	14 November	Keiichiro Nagashima; Japan	34.97	Joji Kato; Japan	35.01	Lee Kang-seok; South Korea	35.10	
2	Berlin, Germany	19 November	Joji Kato; Japan	35.03	Jan Smeekens; Netherlands	35.04	Lee Kang-seok; South Korea	35.10	
2	Berlin, Germany	20 November	Pekka Koskela; Finland	34.90	Tucker Fredricks; United States	34.91	Lee Kang-seok; South Korea	35.13	
4	Changchun, China	4 December	Lee Kang-seok; South Korea	35.10	Joji Kato; Japan	35.25	Keiichiro Nagashima; Japan	35.30	
4	Changchun, China	5 December	Tucker Fredricks; United States	35.26	Jan Smeekens; Netherlands	35.27	Lee Kyou-hyuk; South Korea	35.32	
5	Obihiro, Japan	11 December	Lee Kang-seok; South Korea	35.11	Keiichiro Nagashima; Japan	35.16	Akio Ota; Japan	35.16	
5	Obihiro, Japan	12 December	Joji Kato; Japan	34.96	Keiichiro Nagashima; Japan	35.19	Lee Kyou-hyuk; South Korea	35.19	
6	Moscow, Russia	28 January	Pekka Koskela; Finland	35.15	Jamie Gregg; Canada	35.23	Jacques de Koning; Netherlands	35.24	
6	Moscow, Russia	29 January	Jan Smeekens; Netherlands	34.93	Akio Ota; Japan	35.02	Tucker Fredricks; United States	35.06	
8	Heerenveen, Netherlands	4 March	Lee Kang-seok; South Korea	35.03	Lee Kyou-hyuk; South Korea	35.08	Jacques de Koning; Netherlands	35.18	
8	Heerenveen, Netherlands	6 March	Lee Kyou-hyuk; South Korea	35.00	Yūya Oikawa; Japan	35.11	Lee Kang-seok; South Korea	35.12	

== Standings ==
Standings as of 6 March 2011 (end of the season).

#	Name	Nat.	HVN1	HVN2	BER1	BER2	CHA1	CHA2	OBI1	OBI2	MOS1	MOS2	HVN3	HVN4	Total
1	Lee Kang-seok	(South Korea)	80	70	70	70	100	60	100	40	–	–	150	105	845
2	Lee Kyou-hyuk	(South Korea)	70	45	60	60	60	70	40	70	–	–	120	150	745
3	Joji Kato	(Japan)	100	80	100	50	80	45	60	100	–	–	40	16	671
4	Tucker Fredricks	(United States)	28	50	50	80	45	100	36	45	36	70	24	75	639
5	Jan Smeekens	(Netherlands)	60	32	80	32	28	80	–	–	45	100	90	45	592
6	Keiichiro Nagashima	(Japan)	36	100	45	45	70	32	80	80	–	–	36	14	538
7	Akio Ota	(Japan)	40	60	36	36	14	36	70	60	16	80	45	8	501
8	Yūya Oikawa	(Japan)	24	14	18	40	40	40	45	28	50	24	32	120	475
9	Dmitry Lobkov	(Russia)	32	12	28	21	50	50	50	32	24	45	16	90	450
10	Jacques de Koning	(Netherlands)	25	36	32	24	32	21	32	5	70	6	105	18	406
11	Nico Ihle	(Germany)	50	28	40	6	18	12	24	14	40	60	10	21	323
12	Jamie Gregg	(Canada)	–	–	–	–	36	8	28	50	80	50	18	36	306
13	Pekka Koskela	(Finland)	10	0	25	100	–	–	–	–	100	18	0	24	277
14	Ryohei Haga	(Japan)	3	18	21	5	24	18	18	18	60	21	28	40	274
15	Stefan Groothuis	(Netherlands)	45	40	12	18	5	12	–	–	21	28	75	–	256
16	Hein Otterspeer	(Netherlands)	19	19	24	28	8	6	14	16	12	36	21	12	215
17	Aleksey Yesin	(Russia)	11	15	5	16	10	16	16	24	21	32	12	6	184
18	Espen Aarnes Hvammen	(Norway)	4	0	19	25	21	28	10	10	32	8	3	4	164
19	Vincent Labrie	(Canada)	21	16	16	12	16	5	12	21	14	12	5	5	155
20	Mika Poutala	(Finland)	5	10	–	–	–	–	–	–	28	40	14	28	125
21	Simon Kuipers	(Netherlands)	–	25	14	10	12	14	–	–	–	10	6	32	123
22	Ermanno Ioriatti	(Italy)	6	4	2	6	8	15	15	15	10	16	8	10	115
23	Roman Krech	(Kazakhstan)	2	1	1	0	25	24	21	36	–	–	–	–	110
24	Muncef Ouardi	(Canada)	0	8	8	4	11	0	11	25	8	14	2	2	93
25	Wang Nan	(China)	6	5	0	11	19	11	25	–	–	–	–	–	77
26	William Dutton	(Canada)	12	8	11	19	6	4	8	8	–	–	–	–	76
27	Gilmore Junio	(Canada)	15	6	8	4	15	8	6	12	–	–	–	–	74
28	Mun Jun	(South Korea)	16	24	10	14	–	–	–	–	–	–	–	–	64
29	Denny Ihle	(Germany)	0	0	0	0	0	19	8	19	6	5	–	–	57
30	Shani Davis	(United States)	18	21	6	8	–	–	–	–	–	–	–	–	53
31	Tyler Derraugh	(Canada)	–	–	–	–	–	–	–	–	15	25	4	3	47
32	Samuel Schwarz	(Germany)	14	6	4	0	0	–	19	–	–	3	–	–	46
33	Mike Blumel	(United States)	1	11	15	2	0	1	2	11	–	–	–	–	43
34	Zhang Yaolin	(China)	8	4	6	15	1	6	–	–	–	–	–	–	40
35	Sun Bing	(China)	–	–	–	–	2	25	5	6	–	–	–	–	38
36	Daniel Greig	(Australia)	–	–	0	0	–	–	–	–	19	19	–	–	38
37	Ronald Mulder	(Netherlands)	2	–	–	–	–	–	–	–	25	–	–	–	27
38	Sergey Chadayev	(Russia)	–	–	–	–	–	–	–	–	8	15	–	–	23
39	Artur Waś	(Poland)	0	2	0	8	–	–	–	–	5	4	–	–	19
40	Matthew McLean	(Canada)	–	–	–	–	–	–	–	–	6	8	–	–	14
41	Jan Bos	(Netherlands)	–	–	–	–	–	–	6	6	–	–	–	–	12
42	Joey Lindsey	(United States)	–	–	–	–	–	–	–	–	0	11	–	–	11
42	Markus Puolakka	(Finland)	0	–	0	0	–	–	–	–	11	0	–	–	11
44	Richard MacClennan	(Canada)	8	0	0	–	–	–	–	–	–	–	–	–	8
44	Pim Schipper	(Netherlands)	–	–	–	–	–	–	0	8	–	–	–	–	8
46	Guo Qiang	(China)	0	0	0	0	6	2	0	0	–	–	–		8
46	Yevgeny Lalenkov	(Russia)	–	–	–	–	–	–	–	–	2	6	–	–	8
48	Sjoerd de Vries	(Netherlands)	–	–	–	–	–	–	4	4	–	–	–	–	8
49	Nan Minghao	(China)	0	0	0	0	0	4	1	1	–	–	–	–	6
50	Mitchell Whitmore	(United States)	–	–	–	–	–	–	–	–	1	4	–	–	5
51	Christoffer Fagerli Rukke	(Norway)	0	0	–	–	–	–	–	–	4	–	–	–	4
51	Mikael Flygind Larsen	(Norway)	–	–	–	–	4	–	–	–	–	0	–	–	4
51	Konrad Niedźwiedzki	(Poland)	4	–	0	–	–	–	–	–	–	–	–	–	4
54	Tuomas Nieminen	(Finland)	–	0	0	1	–	–	0	2	–	–	–	–	3
55	Viktor Gluschenko	(Kazakhstan)	–	–	–	–	–	–	–	–	0	2	–	–	2
56	Aleksandr Lebedev	(Russia)	–	–	–	–	–	–	–	–	0	1	–	–	1
