= 2010–11 ISU Speed Skating World Cup – Women's 3000 and 5000 metres =

The 3000 and 5000 metres distances for women in the 2010–11 ISU Speed Skating World Cup were contested over six races on six occasions, out of a total of eight World Cup occasions for the season, with the first occasion taking place in Heerenveen, Netherlands, on 12–14 November 2010, and the final occasion also taking place in Heerenveen on 4–6 March 2011.

Martina Sáblíková of the Czech Republic successfully defended her title from the previous season, while Stephanie Beckert of Germany repeated her second place, and Jilleanne Rookard of the United States came third.

Sábliková set a new world record on the 5000 metres in the Salt Lake City event on 18 February 2011.

== Top three ==
Medal	Athlete	Points	Previous season
Gold	(Czech Republic) Martina Sáblíková	510	1st
Silver	(Germany) Stephanie Beckert	475	2nd
Bronze	(United States) Jilleanne Rookard	351	12th

== Race medallists ==
Occasion #	Location	Date	Distance	Gold	Time	Silver	Time	Bronze	Time	Report
1	Heerenveen, Netherlands	13 November	3000 metres	Stephanie Beckert; Germany	4:04.38	Cindy Klassen; Canada	4:07.19	Kristina Groves; Canada	4:08.01	
2	Berlin, Germany	20 November	3000 metres	Jilleanne Rookard; United States	4:04.38	Martina Sáblíková; Czech Republic	4:05.83	Stephanie Beckert; Germany	4:06.12	
3	Hamar, Norway	27 November	5000 metres	Stephanie Beckert; Germany	6:59.18	Martina Sáblíková; Czech Republic	7:03.95	Eriko Ishino; Japan	7:06.70	
6	Moscow, Russia	28 January	3000 metres	Martina Sáblíková; Czech Republic	4:04.03	Ireen Wüst; Netherlands	4:05.41	Brittany Schussler; Canada	4:10.45	
7	Salt Lake City, United States	18 February	5000 metres	Martina Sáblíková; Czech Republic	6:42.66; WR	Stephanie Beckert; Germany	6:47.03	Eriko Ishino; Japan	6:55.07	
8	Heerenveen, Netherlands	5 March	3000 metres	Martina Sáblíková; Czech Republic	4:06.21	Stephanie Beckert; Germany	4:08.03	Jorien Voorhuis; Netherlands	4:08.96	

== Standings ==
Standings as of 6 March 2011 (end of the season).

#	Name	Nat.	HVN1	BER	HAM	MOS	SLC	HVN2	Total
1	Martina Sáblíková	(Czech Republic)	0	80	80	100	100	150	510
2	Stephanie Beckert	(Germany)	100	70	100	5	80	120	475
3	Jilleanne Rookard	(United States)	40	100	60	36	40	75	351
4	Brittany Schussler	(Canada)	45	60	45	70	15	32	267
5	Eriko Ishino	(Japan)	36	40	70	–	70	40	256
6	Jorien Voorhuis	(Netherlands)	24	–	15	50	45	105	239
7	Cindy Klassen	(Canada)	80	24	40	–	50	24	218
8	Shiho Ishizawa	(Japan)	32	28	30	–	60	36	186
9	Ireen Wüst	(Netherlands)	60	36	–	80	–	–	176
10	Christine Nesbitt	(Canada)	50	45	–	60	–	–	155
11	Ida Njåtun	(Norway)	25	32	35	32	25	–	149
12	Marije Joling	(Netherlands)	21	12	15	45	–	45	138
13	Masako Hozumi	(Japan)	12	21	50	–	35	16	134
14	Jennifer Bay	(Germany)	18	18	20	24	18	28	126
15	Claudia Pechstein	(Germany)	–	–	–	–	35	90	125
16	Kristina Groves	(Canada)	70	50	–	–	–	–	120
17	Elena Sokhryakova	(Russia)	0	8	35	40	30	–	113
18	Luiza Złotkowska	(Poland)	28	10	25	6	15	12	96
19	Mari Hemmer	(Norway)	–	0	13	28	30	18	89
20	Katrin Mattscherodt	(Germany)	–	0	30	16	25	14	85
21	Cathrine Grage	(Denmark)	16	14	25	10	5	8	78
22	Ayaka Kikuchi	(Japan)	6	15	6	14	9	21	71
23	Olga Graf	(Russia)	15	5	11	8	4	10	53
24	Diane Valkenburg	(Netherlands)	–	–	–	25	20	–	45
25	Moniek Kleinsman	(Netherlands)	8	19	18	–	–	–	45
26	Anna Rokita	(Austria)	2	0	9	18	8	–	37
27	Yekaterina Lobysheva	(Russia)	19	16	–	–	–	–	35
28	Linda de Vries	(Netherlands)	–	–	–	19	13	–	32
29	Ivanie Blondin	(Canada)	–	–	4	6	21	–	31
29	Isabell Ost	(Germany)	10	–	–	21	–	–	31
31	Natalia Czerwonka	(Poland)	8	6	–	12	–	–	26
32	Nicole Garrido	(Canada)	2	4	10	–	10	–	26
33	Marrit Leenstra	(Netherlands)	–	25	–	–	–	–	25
34	Fuyo Matsuoka	(Japan)	11	8	5	–	–	–	24
35	Carlijn Achtereekte	(Netherlands)	–	–	21	–	–	–	21
36	Benthe Kraus	(Germany)	6	2	8	–	–	–	16
37	Natsumi Kado	(Japan)	–	–	–	15	–	–	15
38	Maren Haugli	(Norway)	14	–	–	–	–	–	14
39	Lee Ju-yeon	(South Korea)	1	11	–	–	–	–	12
40	Maria Lamb	(United States)	–	–	–	–	11	–	11
40	Galina Likhachova	(Russia)	–	–	–	11	–	–	11
42	Sara Bak	(Denmark)	0	1	–	8	–	–	9
43	Wang Fei	(China)	3	6	–	–	–	–	9
44	Kirsti Lay	(Canada)	–	–	–	2	6	–	8
45	Yvonne Nauta	(Netherlands)	–	–	–	–	7	–	7
45	Annouk van der Weijden	(Netherlands)	–	–	7	–	–	–	7
47	Ji Jia	(China)	4	0	–	–	2	–	6
48	Park Do-yeong	(South Korea)	5	0	–	–	–	–	5
49	Irene Schouten	(Netherlands)	4	0	–	–	–	–	4
49	Anastasiya Vorontsova	(Russia)	–	–	–	4	–	–	4
51	Chunyan Fu	(China)	0	0	–	–	3	–	3
51	Lada Zadonskaya	(Russia)	–	–	3	0	–	–	3
53	Dong Feifei	(China)	–	–	–	–	1	–	1
53	Tatyana Mikhailova	(Belarus)	0	0	–	1	–	–	1
