= 2010–11 ISU Speed Skating World Cup – Women's 1500 metres =

The 1500 metres distance for women in the 2010–11 ISU Speed Skating World Cup was contested over six races on six occasions, out of a total of eight World Cup occasions for the season, with the first occasion taking place in Heerenveen, Netherlands, on 12–14 November 2010, and the final occasion also taking place in Heerenveen on 4–6 March 2011.

The previous season's runner-up, Christine Nesbitt of Canada, won the cup, while Marrit Leenstra of the Netherlands came second, and Ireen Wüst, also of the Netherlands, came third. The defending champion, Kristina Groves of Canada, ended up in 22nd place.

== Top three ==
Medal	Athlete	Points	Previous season
Gold	(Canada) Christine Nesbitt	575	2nd
Silver	(Netherlands) Marrit Leenstra	466	41st
Bronze	(Netherlands) Ireen Wüst	460	6th

== Race medallists ==
Occasion #	Location	Date	Gold	Time	Silver	Time	Bronze	Time	Report
1	Heerenveen, Netherlands	14 November	Christine Nesbitt; Canada	1:56.00	Ireen Wüst; Netherlands	1:57.35	Marrit Leenstra; Netherlands	1:57.68	
2	Berlin, Germany	19 November	Christine Nesbitt; Canada	1:57.03	Ida Njåtun; Norway	1:57.99	Ireen Wüst; Netherlands	1:58.93	
3	Hamar, Norway	28 November	Christine Nesbitt; Canada	1:58.00	Marrit Leenstra; Netherlands	1:58.03	Brittany Schussler; Canada	1:58.96	
6	Moscow, Russia	29 January	Christine Nesbitt; Canada	1:56.80	Ireen Wüst; Netherlands	1:56.93	Martina Sáblíková; Czech Republic	1:57.50	
7	Salt Lake City, United States	19 February	Marrit Leenstra; Netherlands	1:53.38	Ireen Wüst; Netherlands	1:53.75	Christine Nesbitt; Canada	1:54.16	
8	Heerenveen, Netherlands	4 March	Ireen Wüst; Netherlands	1:56.35	Marrit Leenstra; Netherlands	1:57.00	Christine Nesbitt; Canada	1:57.86	

== Standings ==
Standings as of 6 March 2011 (end of the season).

#	Name	Nat.	HVN1	BER	HAM	MOS	SLC	HVN2	Total
1	Christine Nesbitt	(Canada)	100	100	100	100	70	105	575
2	Marrit Leenstra	(Netherlands)	70	36	80	60	100	120	466
3	Ireen Wüst	(Netherlands)	80	70	–	80	80	150	460
4	Brittany Schussler	(Canada)	50	50	70	45	36	14	265
5	Martina Sáblíková	(Czech Republic)	–	40	36	70	6	75	227
6	Cindy Klassen	(Canada)	60	60	45	–	40	8	213
7	Ida Njåtun	(Norway)	19	80	28	21	16	21	185
8	Jilleanne Rookard	(United States)	28	45	40	28	0	40	181
9	Diane Valkenburg	(Netherlands)	–	–	–	36	50	90	176
10	Yekaterina Lobysheva	(Russia)	14	16	50	32	45	18	175
11	Laurine van Riessen	(Netherlands)	45	8	60	18	–	28	169
12	Yekaterina Shikhova	(Russia)	–	14	32	40	21	45	152
13	Jorien Voorhuis	(Netherlands)	–	–	25	50	28	36	139
14	Heather Richardson	(United States)	24	12	–	16	60	24	136
15	Hege Bøkko	(Norway)	8	19	14	24	–	32	97
16	Isabell Ost	(Germany)	21	6	18	10	14	12	81
17	Margot Boer	(Netherlands)	40	21	16	–	–	–	77
18	Miho Takagi	(Japan)	11	25	–	–	18	16	70
19	Yuliya Skokova	(Russia)	6	11	24	8	10	6	65
20	Ingeborg Kroon	(Netherlands)	36	5	21	–	–	–	62
21	Monique Angermüller	(Germany)	8	–	–	25	24	–	57
22	Kristina Groves	(Canada)	32	24	–	–	–	–	56
23	Shannon Rempel	(Canada)	18	18	–	12	8	–	56
24	Noh Seon-yeong	(South Korea)	25	28	–	–	–	–	53
25	Lee Ju-yeon	(South Korea)	16	32	–	–	–	–	48
26	Gabriele Hirschbichler	(Germany)	6	15	–	14	12	–	47
27	Jennifer Bay	(Germany)	12	6	6	6	15	–	45
28	Claudia Pechstein	(Germany)	–	–	–	–	25	10	35
29	Eriko Ishino	(Japan)	10	4	12	–	8	–	34
30	Nao Kodaira	(Japan)	–	–	–	–	32	–	32
31	Masako Hozumi	(Japan)	2	2	8	–	19	–	31
32	Ji Jia	(China)	15	10	–	–	0	–	25
33	Karolína Erbanová	(Czech Republic)	0	0	19	5	–	–	24
34	Luiza Złotkowska	(Poland)	5	0	10	–	6	–	21
35	Ayaka Kikuchi	(Japan)	4	8	8	1	0	–	21
36	Yevgenia Dmitrieva	(Russia)	0	0	–	19	–	–	19
37	Natsumi Kado	(Japan)	–	–	6	11	–	–	17
38	Mari Hemmer	(Norway)	–	–	15	–	1	–	16
39	Alla Shabanova	(Russia)	–	–	–	15	–	–	15
40	Olga Graf	(Russia)	–	–	11	–	–	–	11
40	Linda de Vries	(Netherlands)	–	–	–	–	11	–	11
42	Anna Rokita	(Austria)	0	0	2	8	–	–	10
43	Kirsti Lay	(Canada)	–	–	–	6	4	–	10
44	Yuki Matsuda	(Japan)	4	1	5	–	–	–	10
45	Natalia Czerwonka	(Poland)	2	0	0	4	0	–	6
45	Katrin Mattscherodt	(Germany)	–	0	4	2	–	–	6
47	Wang Fei	(China)	3	0	–	–	–	–	3
48	Elena Sokhryakova	(Russia)	1	–	–	–	2	–	3
49	Ivanie Blondin	(Canada)	–	–	1	0	–	–	1
