= 2010–11 ISU Speed Skating World Cup – Women's 1000 metres =

Tournament

The 1000 metres distance for women in the 2010–11 ISU Speed Skating World Cup was contested over eight races on six occasions, out of a total of eight World Cup occasions for the season, with the first occasion taking place in Heerenveen, Netherlands, on 12–14 November 2010, and the final occasion also taking place in Heerenveen on 4–6 March 2011.

Heather Richardson of the United States won the cup, while defending champion Christine Nesbitt of Canada came second, and Margot Boer of the Netherlands came third.

== Top three ==
Medal	Athlete	Points	Previous season
Gold	(United States) Heather Richardson	605	9th
Silver	(Canada) Christine Nesbitt	590	1st
Bronze	(Netherlands) Margot Boer	360	2nd

== Race medallists ==
Occasion #	Location	Date	Gold	Time	Silver	Time	Bronze	Time	Report
1	Heerenveen, Netherlands	12 November	Christine Nesbitt; Canada	1:15.84	Margot Boer; Netherlands	1:16.50	Ireen Wüst; Netherlands	1:16.75	
2	Berlin, Germany	21 November	Christine Nesbitt; Canada	1:15.86	Heather Richardson; United States	1:16.31	Margot Boer; Netherlands	1:16.51	
4	Changchun, China	4 December	Christine Nesbitt; Canada	1:16.07	Heather Richardson; United States	1:17.49	Judith Hesse; Germany	1:18.04	
4	Changchun, China	5 December	Christine Nesbitt; Canada	1:16.55	Heather Richardson; United States	1:17.59	Nao Kodaira; Japan	1:17.98	
5	Obihiro, Japan	11 December	Heather Richardson; United States	1:16.45	Nao Kodaira; Japan	1:17.33	Lee Sang-hwa; South Korea	1:17.87	
5	Obihiro, Japan	12 December	Heather Richardson; United States	1:17.27	Nao Kodaira; Japan	1:17.77	Maki Tsuji; Japan	1:18.29	
6	Moscow, Russia	30 January	Christine Nesbitt; Canada	1:15.59	Ireen Wüst; Netherlands	1:15.94	Heather Richardson; United States	1:16.18	
8	Heerenveen, Netherlands	6 March	Ireen Wüst; Netherlands	1:15.76	Marrit Leenstra; Netherlands	1:16.19	Laurine van Riessen; Netherlands	1:16.37	

== Standings ==
Standings as of 6 March 2011 (end of the season).

#	Name	Nat.	HVN1	BER	CHA1	CHA2	OBI1	OBI2	MOS	HVN2	Total
1	Heather Richardson	(United States)	50	80	80	80	100	100	70	45	605
2	Christine Nesbitt	(Canada)	100	100	100	100	–	–	100	90	590
3	Margot Boer	(Netherlands)	80	70	60	50	–	–	60	40	360
4	Nao Kodaira	(Japan)	45	28	36	70	80	80	–	14	353
5	Ireen Wüst	(Netherlands)	70	50	–	–	–	–	80	150	350
6	Laurine van Riessen	(Netherlands)	60	60	6	21	–	–	50	105	302
7	Shannon Rempel	(Canada)	32	40	28	32	50	36	18	28	264
8	Judith Hesse	(Germany)	12	18	70	18	45	50	24	24	261
9	Marrit Leenstra	(Netherlands)	40	45	–	–	–	–	45	120	250
10	Gabriele Hirschbichler	(Germany)	19	5	45	45	40	45	21	8	228
11	Maki Tsuji	(Japan)	28	24	18	40	32	70	–	10	222
12	Monique Angermüller	(Germany)	18	36	32	16	18	60	36	–	216
13	Brittany Schussler	(Canada)	36	8	40	60	–	–	40	18	202
14	Miho Takagi	(Japan)	15	14	24	28	60	40	–	16	187
15	Chiara Simionato	(Italy)	8	4	16	12	36	24	32	12	144
16	Cindy Klassen	(Canada)	0	15	50	36	–	–	–	21	122
17	Lee Sang-hwa	(South Korea)	24	6	21	–	70	–	–	–	121
18	Ida Njåtun	(Norway)	25	32	–	–	–	–	10	36	103
19	Annette Gerritsen	(Netherlands)	–	–	–	–	–	–	25	75	100
20	Zhang Hong	(China)	–	–	19	24	24	28	–	5	100
21	Roxanne van Hemert	(Netherlands)	–	–	15	14	28	32	–	–	89
22	Yekaterina Lobysheva	(Russia)	14	12	–	–	–	–	28	32	86
23	Yevgenia Dmitrieva	(Russia)	0	0	11	6	14	21	8	6	66
24	Natasja Bruintjes	(Netherlands)	21	21	12	10	–	–	–	–	64
25	Rebekah Bradford	(United States)	5	2	14	8	10	14	6	4	63
26	Yekaterina Malysheva	(Russia)	4	–	0	2	21	18	–	–	45
27	Hege Bøkko	(Norway)	6	25	–	–	–	–	12	–	43
28	Yuliya Skokova	(Russia)	8	19	–	–	–	–	16	–	43
29	Lee Bo-ra	(South Korea)	1	1	10	5	16	8	–	–	41
30	Yekaterina Shikhova	(Russia)	–	16	–	–	–	–	14	–	30
31	Yuki Matsuda	(Japan)	2	0	–	–	12	16	–	–	30
32	Qi Shuai	(China)	0	0	8	1	8	12	–	–	29
33	Olga Fatkulina	(Russia)	10	6	–	–	–	–	11	–	27
34	Kristina Groves	(Canada)	16	10	–	–	–	–	–	–	26
35	Yu Jing	(China)	–	–	25	–	–	–	–	–	25
36	Karolína Erbanová	(Czech Republic)	11	8	–	–	–	–	5	–	24
37	Anastasia Bucsis	(Canada)	–	–	4	3	4	10	–	–	21
38	Jilleanne Rookard	(United States)	3	11	–	–	–	–	6	–	20
39	Martina Sáblíková	(Czech Republic)	–	–	–	–	–	–	19	–	19
40	Lauren Cholewinski	(United States)	2	0	8	0	3	5	–	–	18
41	Erina Kamiya	(Japan)	–	–	2	4	6	6	–	–	18
42	Yukana Nishina	(Japan)	–	–	–	–	–	–	15	–	15
43	Nadezhda Aseyeva	(Russia)	–	–	1	0	5	3	–	–	9
44	Sarah Gregg	(Canada)	–	–	–	–	–	–	8	–	8
45	Natalia Czerwonka	(Poland)	6	–	–	–	–	–	–	–	6
45	Jin Peiyu	(China)	–	0	6	0	–	–	–	–	6
47	Elena Abramovskaya	(Russia)	–	–	0	0	2	4	–	–	6
48	Natsumi Kado	(Japan)	–	–	–	–	–	–	4	–	4
48	Isabell Ost	(Germany)	4	–	–	–	–	–	–	–	4
50	Tamara Oudenaarden	(Canada)	–	–	–	–	–	–	2	–	2
51	Anna Rokita	(Austria)	–	–	–	–	–	–	1	–	1
