= 2010–11 ISU Speed Skating World Cup – Men's team pursuit =

The men's team pursuit in the 2010–11 ISU Speed Skating World Cup was contested over three races on three occasions, out of a total of eight World Cup occasions for the season, with the first occasion involving the distance taking place in Berlin, Germany, on 19–21 November 2010, and the final occasion involving the distance taking place in Moscow, Russia, on 4–6 March 2011.

Norway successfully defended their title, while Russia came second, and the United States came third.

== Top three ==
| Medal | Country | Points | Previous season |
|---|---|---|---|
| Gold | Norway | 380 | 1st |
| Silver | Russia | 350 | 8th |
| Bronze | United States | 306 | 4th |

== Race medallists ==
| Occasion # | Location | Date | Gold | Time | Silver | Time | Bronze | Time | Report |
|---|---|---|---|---|---|---|---|---|---|
| 2 | Berlin, Germany | 21 November | United States; Shani Davis; Trevor Marsicano; Jonathan Kuck | 3:43.10 | Norway; Håvard Bøkko; Henrik Christiansen; Sverre Lunde Pedersen | 3:44.65 | Netherlands; Wouter olde Heuvel; Koen Verweij; Bob de Vries | 3:45.38 | |
| 3 | Hamar, Norway | 27 November | United States; Shani Davis; Jonathan Kuck; Trevor Marsicano | 3:43.58 | Canada; Lucas Makowsky; Denny Morrison; Justin Warsylewicz | 3:44.61 | Norway; Håvard Bøkko; Henrik Christiansen; Fredrik van der Horst | 3:47.01 | |
| 6 | Moscow, Russia | 30 January | Russia; Ivan Skobrev; Pavel Baynov; Aleksandr Rumyantsev | 3:43.71 | Norway; Håvard Bøkko; Mikael Flygind Larsen; Sverre Lunde Pedersen | 3:46.68 | Germany; Patrick Beckert; Marco Weber; Robert Lehmann | 3:47.15 | |

== Standings ==
Standings as of 6 March 2011 (end of the season).

| # | Nation | BER | HAM | MOS | Total |
|---|---|---|---|---|---|
| 1 | Norway | 80 | 70 | 120 | 270 |
| 2 | Russia | 40 | 60 | 150 | 250 |
| 3 | United States | 100 | 100 | 32 | 232 |
| 4 | Canada | 50 | 80 | 90 | 220 |
| 5 | Germany | 45 | 24 | 105 | 174 |
| 6 | Poland | 32 | 40 | 75 | 147 |
| 7 | Italy | 60 | 36 | 45 | 141 |
| 8 | Netherlands | 70 | 50 | 0 | 120 |
| 9 | Kazakhstan | 28 | 45 | 36 | 109 |
| 10 | Czech Republic | 18 | 21 | 40 | 79 |
| 11 | France | 24 | 32 | – | 56 |
| 12 | Japan | 21 | 28 | – | 49 |
| 13 | South Korea | 36 | – | – | 36 |
