= 2010–11 ISU Speed Skating World Cup – Women's 500 metres =

The 500 metres distance for women in the 2010–11 ISU Speed Skating World Cup was contested over 12 races on six occasions, out of a total of eight World Cup occasions for the season, with the first occasion taking place in Heerenveen, Netherlands, on 12–14 November 2010, and the final occasion also taking place in Heerenveen on 4–6 March 2011.

Jenny Wolf of Germany successfully defended her title from the previous season, while Lee Sang-hwa of South Korea came second, and Margot Boer of the Netherlands came third.

== Top three ==
Medal	Athlete	Points	Previous season
Gold	(Germany) Jenny Wolf	1190	1st
Silver	(South Korea) Lee Sang-hwa	875	5th
Bronze	(Netherlands) Margot Boer	735	2nd

== Race medallists ==
Occasion #	Location	Date	Gold	Time	Silver	Time	Bronze	Time	Report
1	Heerenveen, Netherlands	12 November	Jenny Wolf; Germany	38.02	Lee Sang-hwa; South Korea	38.30	Margot Boer; Netherlands	38.39	
1	Heerenveen, Netherlands	13 November	Jenny Wolf; Germany	38.17	Margot Boer; Netherlands	38.54	Nao Kodaira; Japan	38.77	
2	Berlin, Germany	19 November	Jenny Wolf; Germany	38.08	Lee Sang-hwa; South Korea	38.24	Margot Boer; Netherlands	38.66	
2	Berlin, Germany	20 November	Jenny Wolf; Germany	37.98	Margot Boer; Netherlands	38.46	Lee Sang-hwa; South Korea	38.56	
4	Changchun, China	4 December	Lee Sang-hwa; South Korea	38.24	Jenny Wolf; Germany	38.29	Nao Kodaira; Japan	38.51	
4	Changchun, China	5 December	Lee Sang-hwa; South Korea	38.22	Yu Jing; China	38.27	Jenny Wolf; Germany	38.44	
5	Obihiro, Japan	11 December	Lee Sang-hwa; South Korea	38.18	Yu Jing; China	38.21	Jenny Wolf; Germany	38.25	
5	Obihiro, Japan	12 December	Jenny Wolf; Germany	38.03	Lee Sang-hwa; South Korea	38.21	Yu Jing; China	38.30	
6	Moscow, Russia	28 January	Jenny Wolf; Germany	37.90	Margot Boer; Netherlands	38.56	Heather Richardson; United States	38.57	
6	Moscow, Russia	29 January	Jenny Wolf; Germany	38.01	Margot Boer; Netherlands	38.49	Heather Richardson; United States	38.53	
8	Heerenveen, Netherlands	5 March	Annette Gerritsen; Netherlands	38.31	Jenny Wolf; Germany	38.37	Lee Sang-hwa; South Korea	38.49	
8	Heerenveen, Netherlands	6 March	Jenny Wolf; Germany	38.37	Lee Sang-hwa; South Korea	38.48	Annette Gerritsen; Netherlands	38.55	

== Standings ==
Standings as of 6 March 2011 (end of the season).

#	Name	Nat.	HVN1	HVN2	BER1	BER2	CHA1	CHA2	OBI1	OBI2	MOS1	MOS2	HVN3	HVN4	Total
1	Jenny Wolf	(Germany)	100	100	100	100	80	70	70	100	100	100	120	150	1190
2	Lee Sang-hwa	(South Korea)	80	40	80	70	100	100	100	80	–	–	105	120	875
3	Margot Boer	(Netherlands)	70	80	70	80	60	50	–	–	80	80	75	90	735
4	Heather Richardson	(United States)	45	50	36	50	45	28	50	40	70	70	28	36	548
5	Nao Kodaira	(Japan)	60	70	50	60	70	45	60	60	–	–	36	–	511
6	Judith Hesse	(Germany)	24	12	45	36	40	32	45	45	50	45	40	28	442
7	Maki Tsuji	(Japan)	40	45	24	28	32	36	40	50	–	–	90	45	430
8	Laurine van Riessen	(Netherlands)	50	60	60	5	50	21	–	–	45	50	45	–	386
9	Annette Gerritsen	(Netherlands)	–	–	–	–	–	–	–	–	60	60	150	105	375
10	Shannon Rempel	(Canada)	19	25	28	32	24	24	24	21	40	40	10	24	311
11	Thijsje Oenema	(Netherlands)	28	24	21	45	8	10	10	16	32	36	21	40	291
12	Yu Jing	(China)	–	–	–	–	25	80	80	70	–	–	–	–	255
13	Lee Bo-ra	(South Korea)	25	36	18	21	21	14	28	32	–	–	24	32	251
14	Qi Shuai	(China)	40	21	12	14	36	40	21	36	–	–	16	14	250
15	Yukana Nishina	(Japan)	18	16	8	16	14	8	16	14	24	32	14	16	196
16	Wang Beixing	(China)	–	–	–	–	28	60	–	–	–	–	32	75	195
17	Olga Fatkulina	(Russia)	14	18	40	40	–	–	–	–	21	24	18	12	187
18	Lauren Cholewinski	(United States)	16	14	14	8	12	16	18	28	10	14	12	18	180
19	Christine Nesbitt	(Canada)	32	28	32	10	16	18	–	–	–	–	–	–	136
20	Chiara Simionato	(Italy)	15	11	5	6	8	1	3	8	28	21	0	21	127
21	Monique Angermüller	(Germany)	21	10	–	–	15	25	12	–	36	–	–	–	119
22	Rebekah Bradford	(United States)	2	4	6	15	6	6	8	10	12	18	8	8	103
23	Miho Takagi	(Japan)	8	8	11	25	10	6	6	12	–	–	0	10	96
24	Marianne Timmer	(Netherlands)	10	32	10	18	6	12	–	–	–	–	–	–	88
25	Jin Peiyu	(China)	12	–	25	24	18	–	–	–	–	–	–	–	79
26	Karolína Erbanová	(Czech Republic)	11	15	16	4	–	–	–	–	14	16	–	–	76
27	Li Dan	(China)	–	–	–	–	–	19	32	24	–	–	–	–	75
28	Anastasia Bucsis	(Canada)	4	19	6	12	4	15	4	6	–	–	–	–	70
29	Yekaterina Malysheva	(Russia)	4	4	19	0	1	2	14	4	6	12	–	–	66
30	Zhang Hong	(China)	–	–	–	–	–	11	36	18	–	–	–	–	65
31	Anice Das	(Netherlands)	–	–	15	19	5	5	2	2	–	–	–	–	48
32	Mayon Kuipers	(Netherlands)	–	–	–	–	–	–	–	–	18	28	–	–	46
33	Gabriele Hirschbichler	(Germany)	6	2	–	2	11	8	5	5	–	–	–	–	39
34	Heike Hartmann	(Germany)	1	0	6	6	–	–	–	–	16	5	–	–	34
35	Oh Min-jee	(South Korea)	8	8	6	11	–	–	–	–	–	–	–	–	33
36	Reika Shimizu	(Japan)	2	3	0	8	2	4	1	3	–	–	–	–	23
37	Nadezhda Aseyeva	(Russia)	1	2	0	0	0	0	0	1	8	8	–	–	20
38	Sheng Xiaomei	(China)	–	–	–	–	19	–	–	–	–	–	–	–	19
39	Jennifer Plate	(Germany)	–	–	1	–	–	–	–	–	5	10	–	–	16
40	Marrit Leenstra	(Netherlands)	5	6	–	–	–	–	–	–	–	–	–	–	11
40	Zhang Lu	(China)	6	5	0	0	–	–	–	–	–	–	–	–	11
42	Yekaterina Aydova	(Kazakhstan)	0	1	8	1	–	–	–	–	–	–	–	–	10
43	Anna Badayeva	(Belarus)	0	0	0	0	–	–	–	–	4	4	–	–	8
44	Tamara Oudenaarden	(Canada)	–	–	–	–	–	–	–	–	0	6	–	–	6
44	Yuliya Skokova	(Russia)	–	6	0	–	–	–	–	–	–	–	–	–	6
46	Irina Arshinova	(Russia)	–	–	–	–	–	–	–	–	3	2	–	–	5
47	Denise Roth	(Germany)	–	–	0	4	–	–	–	–	–	–	–	–	4
48	Sarah Gregg	(Canada)	–	–	–	–	–	–	–	–	1	3	–	–	4
49	Yekaterina Lobysheva	(Russia)	3	–	–	–	–	–	–	–	–	–	–	–	3
50	Hege Bøkko	(Norway)	0	0	–	–	–	–	–	–	2	–	–	–	2
51	Yekaterina Lukoyanova	(Russia)	–	–	–	–	–	–	–	–	0	1	–	–	1
