= 2010–11 ISU Speed Skating World Cup – Women's team pursuit =

The women's team pursuit in the 2010–11 ISU Speed Skating World Cup was contested over three races on three occasions, out of a total of eight World Cup occasions for the season, with the first occasion involving the distance taking place in Berlin, Germany, on 19–21 November 2010, and the final occasion involving the distance taking place in Moscow, Russia, on 4–6 March 2011.

The Netherlands won the cup, while Germany came second, and Norway came third. The defending champions, Canada, came fifth.

== Top three ==
| Medal | Country | Points | Previous season |
|---|---|---|---|
| Gold | Netherlands | 300 | 5th |
| Silver | Germany | 250 | 3rd |
| Bronze | Norway | 250 | 12th |

== Race medallists ==
| Occasion # | Location | Date | Gold | Time | Silver | Time | Bronze | Time | Report |
|---|---|---|---|---|---|---|---|---|---|
| 2 | Berlin, Germany | 21 November | Germany; Isabell Ost; Jennifer Bay; Stephanie Beckert | 3:04.91 | Netherlands; Ireen Wüst; Jorien Voorhuis; Marije Joling | 3:05.50 | Norway; Ida Njåtun; Hege Bøkko; Mari Hemmer | 3:06.67 | |
| 3 | Hamar, Norway | 28 November | Canada; Cindy Klassen; Christine Nesbitt; Brittany Schussler | 3:00.90 | Russia; Yekaterina Lobysheva; Yekaterina Shikhova; Yuliya Skokova | 3:03.90 | Netherlands; Marije Joling; Marrit Leenstra; Jorien Voorhuis | 3:04.62 | |
| 6 | Moscow, Russia | 30 January | Netherlands; Marrit Leenstra; Diane Valkenburg; Ireen Wüst | 3:01.13 | Norway; Ida Njåtun; Mari Hemmer; Hege Bøkko | 3:03.02 | Germany; Stephanie Beckert; Isabell Ost; Jennifer Bay | 3:04.11 | |

== Standings ==
Standings as of 6 March 2011 (end of the season).

| # | Nation | BER | HAM | MOS | Total |
|---|---|---|---|---|---|
| 1 | Netherlands | 80 | 70 | 150 | 300 |
| 2 | Germany | 100 | 45 | 105 | 250 |
| 3 | Norway | 70 | 60 | 120 | 250 |
| 4 | Russia | 50 | 80 | 90 | 220 |
| 5 | Canada | 0 | 100 | 75 | 175 |
| 6 | Poland | 40 | 50 | 45 | 135 |
| 7 | Japan | 32 | 40 | 40 | 112 |
| 8 | United States | 36 | – | 36 | 72 |
| 9 | South Korea | 60 | – | – | 60 |
| 10 | China | 45 | – | – | 45 |
