= 2011 World Allround Speed Skating Championships =

International speed skating competition

World Allround Speed Skating Championships
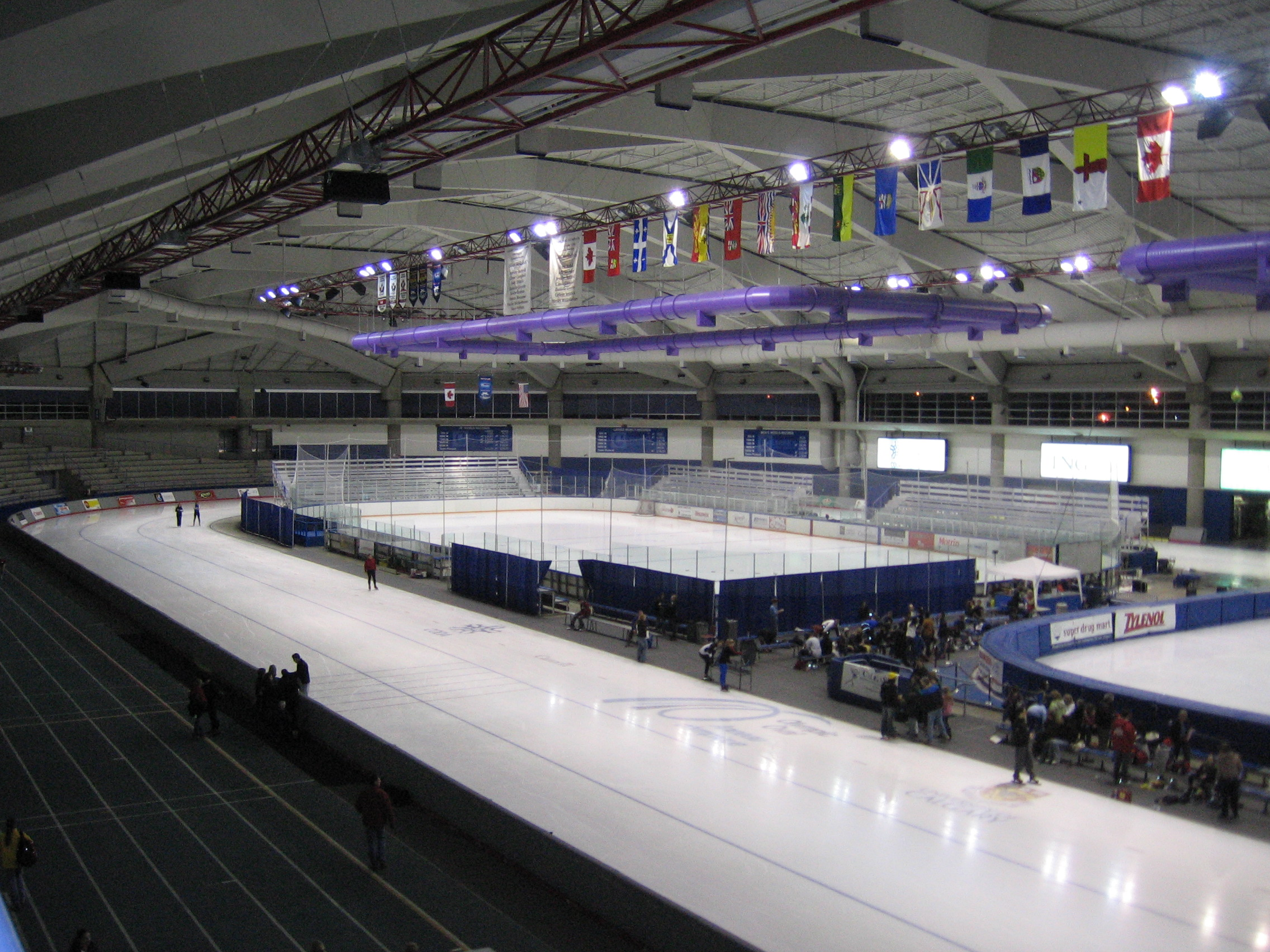
- Olympic Oval (Calgary)
- Location: Calgary, Alberta, Canada
- Venue: Olympic Oval
- Dates: 12 and 13 February
- Competitors: 48

Medalist men
1st place, gold medalist(s)		Ivan Skobrev	RUS
2nd place, silver medalist(s)		Håvard Bøkko	NOR
3rd place, bronze medalist(s)		Jan Blokhuijsen	NED

Medalist women
1st place, gold medalist(s)		Ireen Wüst	NED
2nd place, silver medalist(s)		Christine Nesbitt	CAN
3rd place, bronze medalist(s)		Martina Sáblíková	CZE

The 2011 World Allround Speed Skating Championships was held at the indoor ice rink of the Olympic Oval in Calgary, Alberta, (Canada) on 12 and 13 February 2011.

== Women's championships ==
=== 500 meter ===
Place	Athlete	Country	Time	Points
1	Christine Nesbitt	Canada	37.72	37.720
2	Karolína Erbanová	Czech Republic	38.22	38.220
3	Ireen Wüst	Netherlands	38.53	38.530
3	Marrit Leenstra	Netherlands	38.53	38.530
5	Yekaterina Lobysheva	Russia	38.69	38.690
6	Hege Bøkko	Norway	39.05	39.050
7	Jorien Voorhuis	Netherlands	39.16	39.160
8	Jilleanne Rookard	United States	39.22	39.220
9	Brittany Schussler	Canada	39.24	39.240
10	Cindy Klassen	Canada	39.25	39.250
11	Ida Njåtun	Norway	39.36	39.360
12	Yekaterina Shikhova	Russia	39.41	39.410
13	Diane Valkenburg	Netherlands	39.48	39.480
14	Martina Sáblíková	Czech Republic	39.49	39.490
15	Luiza Złotkowska	Poland	39.96	39.960
16	Ivanie Blondin	Canada	40.05	40.050
17	Ayaka Kikuchi	Japan	40.17	40.170
18	Eriko Ishino	Japan	40.28	40.280
19	Isabell Ost	Germany	40.45	40.450
20	Mari Hemmer	Norway	40.51	40.510
21	Anna Rokita	Austria	40.73	40.730
22	Masako Hozumi	Japan	40.74	40.740
23	Maria Lamb	United States	41.00	41.000
24	Stephanie Beckert	Germany	41.98	41.980

=== 3000 meter ===
Place	Athlete	Country	Time	Points
1	Martina Sáblíková	Czech Republic	3:55.55	39.258
2	Ireen Wüst	Netherlands	3:58.01	39.668
3	Stephanie Beckert	Germany	4:00.77	40.128
4	Diane Valkenburg	Netherlands	4:02.44	40.406
5	Masako Hozumi	Japan	4:02.52	40.420
6	Cindy Klassen	Canada	4:02.55	40.425
7	Marrit Leenstra	Netherlands	4:02.74	40.456
8	Christine Nesbitt	Canada	4:03.44	40.573
9	Eriko Ishino	Japan	4:03.59	40.598
10	Jilleanne Rookard	United States	4:04.15	40.691
11	Brittany Schussler	Canada	4:04.23	40.705
12	Jorien Voorhuis	Netherlands	4:04.43	40.738
13	Ida Njåtun	Norway	4:06.46	41.076
14	Isabell Ost	Germany	4:07.51	41.251
15	Luiza Złotkowska	Poland	4:07.58	41.263
16	Ivanie Blondin	Canada	4:07.86	41.310
17	Yekaterina Lobysheva	Russia	4:08.12	41.353
18	Mari Hemmer	Norway	4:09.40	41.566
19	Yekaterina Shikhova	Russia	4:11.55	41.925
20	Ayaka Kikuchi	Japan	4:11.86	41.976
21	Hege Bøkko	Norway	4:12.81	42.135
22	Anna Rokita	Austria	4:13.03	42.171
23	Maria Lamb	United States	4:16.64	42.773
24	Karolína Erbanová	Czech Republic	4:17.73	42.955

=== 1500 meter ===
Place	Athlete	Country	Time	Points
1	Ireen Wüst	Netherlands	1:52.59	37.530
2	Christine Nesbitt	Canada	1:53.22	37.740
3	Marrit Leenstra	Netherlands	1:53.88	37.960
4	Cindy Klassen	Canada	1:54.88	38.293
5	Brittany Schussler	Canada	1:54.91	38.303
6	Jorien Voorhuis	Netherlands	1:55.20	38.400
7	Diane Valkenburg	Netherlands	1:55.54	38.513
8	Martina Sáblíková	Czech Republic	1:55.61	38.536
9	Ida Njåtun	Norway	1:56.25	38.750
10	Karolína Erbanová	Czech Republic	1:56.37	38.790
11	Yekaterina Shikhova	Russia	1:56.55	38.850
12	Eriko Ishino	Japan	1:56.64	38.880
13	Jilleanne Rookard	United States	1:56.71	38.903
14	Isabell Ost	Germany	1:56.72	38.906
15	Yekaterina Lobysheva	Russia	1:57.02	39.006
16	Masako Hozumi	Japan	1:57.72	39.240
17	Hege Bøkko	Norway	1:57.91	39.303
18	Luiza Złotkowska	Poland	1:58.29	39.430
18	Mari Hemmer	Norway	1:58.29	39.430
20	Stephanie Beckert	Germany	1:58.53	39.510
21	Ivanie Blondin	Canada	1:59.02	39.673
22	Ayaka Kikuchi	Japan	1:59.57	39.856
23	Anna Rokita	Austria	2:01.54	40.513
24	Maria Lamb	United States	2:03.72	41.240

=== 5000 meter ===
Place	Athlete	Country	Time	Points
1	Stephanie Beckert	Germany	6:49.51	40.951
2	Ireen Wüst	Netherlands	6:55.85	41.585
3	Masako Hozumi	Japan	6:56.35	41.635
4	Jilleanne Rookard	United States	6:58.40	41.840
5	Jorien Voorhuis	Netherlands	6:59.23	41.923
6	Cindy Klassen	Canada	6:59.54	41.954
7	Martina Sáblíková	Czech Republic	7:00.04	42.004
8	Eriko Ishino	Japan	7:00.84	42.084
9	Diane Valkenburg	Netherlands	7:04.10	42.410
10	Marrit Leenstra	Netherlands	7:06.74	42.674
11	Brittany Schussler	Canada	7:07.05	42.705
12	Christine Nesbitt	Canada	7:09.06	42.906

Source: ISU results Women

=== Allround results ===
Place	Athlete	Country	500 m	3000 m	1500 m	5000 m	Points
1st place, gold medalist(s)	Ireen Wüst	Netherlands	38.53 (3)	3:58.01 (2)	1:52.59 (1)	6:55.85 (2)	157.313
2nd place, silver medalist(s)	Christine Nesbitt	Canada	37.72 (1)	4:03.44 (8)	1:53.22 (2)	7:09.06 (12)	158.939
3rd place, bronze medalist(s)	Martina Sáblíková	Czech Republic	39.49 (14)	3:55.55 (1)	1:55.61 (8)	7:00.04 (7)	159.288
4	Marrit Leenstra	Netherlands	38.53 (3)	4:02.74 (7)	1:53.88 (3)	7:06.74 (10)	159.620
5	Cindy Klassen	Canada	39.25 (10)	4:02.55 (6)	1:54.88 (4)	6:59.54 (6)	159.922
6	Jorien Voorhuis	Netherlands	39.16 (7)	4:04.43 (12)	1:55.20 (6)	6:59.23 (5)	160.221
7	Jilleanne Rookard	United States	39.22 (8)	4:04.15 (10)	1:56.71 (13)	6:58.40 (4)	160.654
8	Diane Valkenburg	Netherlands	39.48 (13)	4:02.44 (4)	1:55.54 (7)	7:04.10 (9)	160.809
9	Brittany Schussler	Canada	39.24 (9)	4:04.23 (11)	1:54.91 (5)	7:07.05 (11)	160.953
10	Eriko Ishino	Japan	40.28 (18)	4:03.59 (9)	1:56.64 (12)	7:00.84 (8)	161.842
11	Masako Hozumi	Japan	40.74 (22)	4:02.52 (5)	1:57.72 (16)	6:56.35 (3)	162.035
12	Stephanie Beckert	Germany	41.98 (24)	4:00.77 (3)	1:58.53 (20)	6:49.51 (1)	162.569
NQ13	Yekaterina Lobysheva	Russia	38.69 (5)	4:08.12 (17)	1:57.02 (15)		119.049
NQ14	Ida Njåtun	Norway	39.36 (11)	4:06.46 (13)	1:56.25 (9)		119.186
NQ15	Karolína Erbanová	Czech Republic	38.22 (2)	4:17.73 (24)	1:56.37 (10)		119.965
NQ16	Yekaterina Shikhova	Russia	39.41 (12)	4:11.55 (19)	1:56.55 (11)		120.185
NQ17	Hege Bøkko	Norway	39.05 (6)	4:12.81 (21)	1:57.91 (17)		120.488
NQ18	Isabell Ost	Germany	40.45 (19)	4:07.51 (14)	1:56.72 (14)		120.607
NQ19	Luiza Złotkowska	Poland	39.96 (15)	4:07.58 (15)	1:58.29 (18)		120.653
NQ20	Ivanie Blondin	Canada	40.05 (16)	4:07.86 (16)	1:59.02 (21)		121.033
NQ21	Mari Hemmer	Norway	40.51 (20)	4:09.40 (18)	1:58.29 (18)		121.506
NQ22	Ayaka Kikuchi	Japan	40.17 (17)	4:11.86 (20)	1:59.57 (22)		122.002
NQ23	Anna Rokita	Austria	40.73 (21)	4:13.03 (22)	2:01.54 (23)		123.414
NQ24	Maria Lamb	United States	41.00 (23)	4:16.64 (23)	2:03.72 (24)		125.013

NQ = Not qualified for the 5000 m (only the best 12 are qualified)
DQ = disqualified

== Men's championships ==
=== 500 meter ===
Place	Athlete	Country	Time	Points
1	Shani Davis	United States	35.08	35.080
2	Brian Hansen	United States	35.33	35.330
3	Konrad Niedźwiedzki	Poland	35.35	35.350
4	Jan Blokhuijsen	Netherlands	35.59	35.590
5	Koen Verweij	Netherlands	35.64	35.640
6	Lucas Makowsky	Canada	35.76	35.760
7	Ivan Skobrev	Russia	35.90	35.900
7	Håvard Bøkko	Norway	35.90	35.900
9	Jonathan Kuck	United States	35.97	35.970
10	Joel Eriksson	Sweden	36.08	36.080
11	Mathieu Giroux	Canada	36.27	36.270
12	Wouter olde Heuvel	Netherlands	36.41	36.410
13	Renz Rotteveel	Netherlands	36.49	36.490
14	Pavel Baynov	Russia	36.55	36.550
15	Sverre Lunde Pedersen	Norway	36.56	36.560
16	Justin Warsylewicz	Canada	36.60	36.600
17	Alexis Contin	France	36.66	36.660
18	Luca Stefani	Italy	36.72	36.720
19	Jan Szymański	Poland	36.91	36.910
20	Dmitry Babenko	Kazakhstan	37.16	37.160
21	Henrik Christiansen	Norway	37.19	37.190
22	Shota Nakamura	Japan	37.42	37.420
23	Shane Dobbin	New Zealand	37.59	37.590
24	Robert Lehmann	Germany	DQ	920.000

=== 5000 meter ===
Place	Athlete	Country	Time	Points
1	Ivan Skobrev	Russia	6:10.99	37.099
2	Koen Verweij	Netherlands	6:12.20	37.220
3	Håvard Bøkko	Norway	6:12.98	37.298
4	Jan Blokhuijsen	Netherlands	6:14.18	37.418
5	Shane Dobbin	New Zealand	6:15.69	37.569
6	Wouter olde Heuvel	Netherlands	6:17.45	37.745
7	Alexis Contin	France	6:17.72	37.772
8	Jonathan Kuck	United States	6:17.88	37.788
9	Brian Hansen	United States	6:19.14	37.914
10	Renz Rotteveel	Netherlands	6:20.25	38.025
11	Henrik Christiansen	Norway	6:20.74	38.074
12	Sverre Lunde Pedersen	Norway	6:22.83	38.283
13	Dmitry Babenko	Kazakhstan	6:22.96	38.296
14	Shani Davis	United States	6:23.58	38.358
15	Lucas Makowsky	Canada	6:26.73	38.673
16	Robert Lehmann	Germany	6:29.72	38.972
17	Luca Stefani	Italy	6:33.23	39.323
18	Mathieu Giroux	Canada	6:34.29	39.429
19	Jan Szymański	Poland	6:34.72	39.472
20	Konrad Niedźwiedzki	Poland	6:35.08	39.508
21	Pavel Baynov	Russia	6:35.66	39.566
22	Shota Nakamura	Japan	6:36.77	39.677
23	Justin Warsylewicz	Canada	6:37.54	39.754
24	Joel Eriksson	Sweden	6:38.38	39.838

=== 1500 meter ===
Place	Athlete	Country	Time	Points
1	Ivan Skobrev	Russia	1:42.94	34.313
2	Jonathan Kuck	United States	1:43.12	34.373
3	Brian Hansen	United States	1:43.35	34.450
4	Shani Davis	United States	1:43.45	34.483
5	Håvard Bøkko	Norway	1:43.55	34.516
6	Jan Blokhuijsen	Netherlands	1:43.78	34.593
7	Koen Verweij	Netherlands	1:43.92	34.640
8	Wouter olde Heuvel	Netherlands	1:44.24	34.746
9	Mathieu Giroux	Canada	1:44.30	34.766
10	Lucas Makowsky	Canada	1:44.74	34.913
11	Konrad Niedźwiedzki	Poland	1:45.26	35.086
12	Alexis Contin	France	1:45.31	35.103
13	Renz Rotteveel	Netherlands	1:45.34	35.113
14	Sverre Lunde Pedersen	Norway	1:45.48	35.160
15	Joel Eriksson	Sweden	1:45.96	35.320
16	Dmitry Babenko	Kazakhstan	1:46.30	35.433
17	Robert Lehmann	Germany	1:46.57	35.523
18	Shane Dobbin	New Zealand	1:46.61	35.536
19	Henrik Christiansen	Norway	1:46.68	35.560
20	Jan Szymański	Poland	1:46.89	35.630
21	Pavel Baynov	Russia	1:46.98	35.660
22	Justin Warsylewicz	Canada	1:47.79	35.930
23	Shota Nakamura	Japan	1:48.05	36.016
24	Luca Stefani	Italy	1:48.77	36.256

=== 10000 meter ===
Place	Athlete	Country	Time	Points
1	Håvard Bøkko	Norway	12:53.89	38.694
2	Ivan Skobrev	Russia	12:58.36	38.918
3	Jan Blokhuijsen	Netherlands	13:00.04	39.002
4	Shane Dobbin	New Zealand	13:06.17	39.308
5	Koen Verweij	Netherlands	13:08.97	39.448
6	Jonathan Kuck	United States	13:11.24	39.562
7	Wouter olde Heuvel	Netherlands	13:17.75	39.887
8	Shani Davis	United States	13:19.59	39.979
9	Brian Hansen	United States	13:24.11	40.205
10	Renz Rotteveel	Netherlands	13:33.94	40.697
11	Alexis Contin	France	13:36.91	40.845
12	Lucas Makowsky	Canada	13:53.71	41.685

Source: ISU results Men

=== Allround results ===
Place	Athlete	Country	500 m	5000 m	1500 m	10000 m	Points
1st place, gold medalist(s)	Ivan Skobrev	Russia	35.90 (7)	6:10.99 (1)	1:42.94 (1)	12:58.36 (2)	146.230
2nd place, silver medalist(s)	Håvard Bøkko	Norway	35.90 (7)	6:12.98 (3)	1:43.55 (5)	12:53.89 (1)	146.408
3rd place, bronze medalist(s)	Jan Blokhuijsen	Netherlands	35.59 (4)	6:14.18 (4)	1:43.78 (6)	13:00.04 (3)	146.603
4	Koen Verweij	Netherlands	35.64 (5)	6:12.20 (2)	1:43.92 (7)	13:08.97 (5)	146.948
5	Jonathan Kuck	United States	35.97 (9)	6:17.88 (8)	1:43.12 (2)	13:11.24 (6)	147.693
6	Brian Hansen	United States	35.33 (2)	6:19.14 (9)	1:43.35 (3)	13:24.11 (9)	147.899
7	Shani Davis	United States	35.08 (1)	6:23.58 (14)	1:43.45 (4)	13:19.59 (8)	147.900
8	Wouter olde Heuvel	Netherlands	36.41 (12)	6:17.45 (6)	1:44.24 (8)	13:17.75 (7)	148.788
9	Shane Dobbin	New Zealand	37.59 (23)	6:15.69 (5)	1:46.61 (18)	13:06.17 (4)	150.003
10	Renz Rotteveel	Netherlands	36.49 (13)	6:20.25 (10)	1:45.34 (13)	13:33.94 (10)	150.325
11	Alexis Contin	France	36.66 (17)	6:17.72 (7)	1:45.31 (12)	13:36.91 (11)	150.380
12	Lucas Makowsky	Canada	35.76 (6)	6:26.73 (15)	1:44.74 (10)	13:53.71 (12)	151.031
NQ13	Konrad Niedźwiedzki	Poland	35.35 (3)	6:35.08 (20)	1:45.26 (11)		109.944
NQ14	Sverre Lunde Pedersen	Norway	36.56 (15)	6:22.83 (12)	1:45.48 (14)		110.003
NQ15	Mathieu Giroux	Canada	36.27 (11)	6:34.29 (18)	1:44.30 (9)		110.465
NQ16	Henrik Christiansen	Norway	37.19 (21)	6:20.74 (11)	1:46.68 (19)		110.824
NQ17	Dmitry Babenko	Kazakhstan	37.16 (20)	6:22.96 (13)	1:46.30 (16)		110.889
NQ18	Joel Eriksson	Sweden	36.08 (10)	6:38.38 (24)	1:45.96 (15)		111.238
NQ19	Pavel Baynov	Russia	36.55 (14)	6:35.66 (21)	1:46.98 (21)		111.776
NQ20	Jan Szymański	Poland	36.91 (19)	6:34.72 (19)	1:46.89 (20)		112.012
NQ21	Justin Warsylewicz	Canada	36.60 (16)	6:37.54 (23)	1:47.79 (22)		112.284
NQ22	Luca Stefani	Italy	36.72 (18)	6:33.23 (17)	1:48.77 (24)		112.299
NQ23	Shota Nakamura	Japan	37.42 (22)	6:36.77 (22)	1:48.05 (23)		113.113
NQ24	Robert Lehmann	Germany	DQ (24)	6:29.72 (16)	1:46.57 (17)		994.495

NQ = Not qualified for the 10000 m (only the best 12 are qualified)
DQ = disqualified

== Rules ==
All 24 participating skaters are allowed to skate the first three distances; 12 skaters may take part on the fourth distance. These 12 skaters are determined by taking the standings on the longest of the first three distances, as well as the samalog standings after three distances, and comparing these lists as follows:

1. Skaters among the top 12 on both lists are qualified.
2. To make up a total of 12, skaters are then added in order of their best rank on either list. Samalog standings take precedence over the longest-distance standings in the event of a tie.
