= Joel Eriksson =

Joel Eriksson may refer to:

- Joel Eriksson (speed skater) (born 1984), Swedish long track speed skater
- Joel Eriksson (racing driver) (born 1998), Swedish race car driver

== See also ==
- Joel Eriksson Ek, Swedish ice hockey player
