= 2009 World Sprint Speed Skating Championships =

International speed skating competition

World Sprint Speed Skating Championships
- Speedskating rink
- Venue: Krylatskoje
- Dates: 17 and 18 January 2009

Medalist men
1st place, gold medalist(s)		Shani Davis	USA
2nd place, silver medalist(s)		Keiichiro Nagashima	JPN
3rd place, bronze medalist(s)		Simon Kuipers	NED

Medalist women
1st place, gold medalist(s)		Wang Beixing	CHN
2nd place, silver medalist(s)		Jenny Wolf	GER
3rd place, bronze medalist(s)		Yu Jing	CHN

The 2009 World Sprint Speed Skating Championships were held in Krylatskoje, Moscow, on 17 and 18 January 2009. They were the 38th World Championships.

== Women championships ==
=== Sprint results ===
Rank	Name	Nation	500 m (1)	1000 m (1)	500 m (2)	1000 m (2)	Total
1st place, gold medalist(s)	Wang Beixing	China	38.10 (2)	1:16.53 (3)	37.91 (2)	1:16.40 (2)	152.475
2nd place, silver medalist(s)	Jenny Wolf	Germany	38.00 (1)	1:17.58 (6)	37.86 (1)	1:17.52 (10)	153.410
3rd place, bronze medalist(s)	Yu Jing	China	38.42 (4)	1:17.07 (7)	38.40 (4)	1:16.77 (4)	153.740
4	Margot Boer	Netherlands	38.86 (8)	1:16.29 (1)	38.83 (9)	1:16.66 (3)	154.165
5	Jin Peiyu	China	38.57 (6)	1:17.31 (8)	38.68 (7)	1:17.37 (9)	154.590
6	Anni Friesinger	Germany	39.08 (12)	1:16.48 (2)	39.34 (17)	1:16.01 (1)	154.665
7	Sayuri Yoshii	Japan	39.08 (12)	1:17.05 (6)	38.79 (8)	1:16.83 (6)	154.810
8	Shihomi Shinya	Japan	38.71 (7)	1:17.47 (9)	38.89 (10)	1:17.63 (12)	155.150
9	Lee Sang-hwa	South Korea	38.33 (3)	1:18.68 (17)	38.38 (3)	1:18.35 (17)	155.225
10	Laurine van Riessen	Netherlands	38.95 (9)	1:16.95 (5)	39.71 (20)	1:16.81 (5)	155.540
11	Monique Angermüller	Germany	39.17 (14)	1:17.74 (11)	39.01 (12)	1:17.80 (13)	155.950
12	Natasja Bruintjes	Netherlands	39.33 (16)	1:17.78 (12)	39.04 (13)	1:17.53 (11)	156.025
13	Tomomi Okazaki	Japan	38.95 (9)	1:18.41 (16)	38.89 (10)	1:18.50 (19)	156.295
14	Shannon Rempel	Canada	38.41 (17)	1:18.06 (15)	39.36 (18)	1:17.03 (7)	156.315
15	Yulia Nemaya	Russia	38.55 (5)	1:19.62 (22)	38.65 (6)	1:19.11 (21)	156.565
16	Lee Bo-ra	South Korea	39.04 (11)	1:18.96 (19)	39.11 (14)	1:18.26 (15)	156.760
17	Jennifer Rodriguez	United States	39.69 (21)	1:17.91 (14)	38.54 (19)	1:17.27 (8)	156.820
18	Yekaterina Malysheva	Russia	39.23 (15)	1:19.10 (20)	39.12 (15)	1:18.14 (14)	156.970
19	Yekaterina Lobysheva	Russia	39.45 (18)	1:17.83 (12)	39.97 (24)	1:18.38 (18)	157.525
20	Heather Richardson	United States	39.60 (19)	1:19.20 (21)	39.25 (16)	1:18.29 (16)	157.595
21	Heike Hartmann	Germany	39.62 (20)	1:18.91 (18)	39.73 (22)	1:19.23 (22)	158.420
22	An Jee-min	South Korea	39.88 (22)	1:20.61 (24)	39.71 (20)	1:19.62 (23)	159.705
23	Hege Bøkko	Norway	40.43 (25)	1:20.22 (23)	40.68 (27)	1:19.04 (20)	160.740
24	Tamara Oudenaarden	Canada	40.24 (23)	1:20.84 (25)	39.80 (23)	1:20.75 (24)	160.835
NQ25	Kerry Dankers-Simpson	Canada	40.36 (24)	1:21.01 (26)	40.17 (25)		121.035
NQ26	Paulina Wallin	Sweden	40.93 (26)	1:23.76 (28)	40.20 (26)		123.010
NQ27	Yelena Myagkikh	Ukraine	42.14 (27)	1:22.13 (27)	41.84 (28)		125.045
DQ1	Annette Gerritsen	Netherlands	DQ	1:16.82 (4)	38.49 (5)		

NQ = Not qualified for the second 1000m (only the best 24 are qualified)
DQ = disqualified

Source: ISU

== Men championships ==
=== Sprint results ===
Rank	Name	Nation	500 m (1)	1000 m (1)	500 m (2)	1000 m (2)	Total
1st place, gold medalist(s)	Shani Davis	United States	35.63 (10)	1:08.84 (1)	35.18 (6)	1:08.66 (1)	139.560
2nd place, silver medalist(s)	Keiichiro Nagashima	Japan	35.01 (2)	1:09.41 (4)	34.91 (1)	1:10.19 (8)	139.720
3rd place, bronze medalist(s)	Simon Kuipers	Netherlands	35.44 (6)	1:08.43 (2)	35.77 (16)	1:09.55 (4)	140.450
4	Pekka Koskela	Finland	35.27 (5)	1:10.52 (11)	35.15 (4)	1:09.81 (6)	140.585
5	Denny Morrison	Canada	36.02 (17)	1:10.02 (7)	35.71 (14)	1:08.77 (2)	141.125
6	Mika Poutala	Finland	35.67 (11)	1:10.70 (15)	35.14 (3)	1:10.42 (14)	141.370
7	Tadashi Obara	Japan	35.85 (15)	1:10.65 (14)	35.27 (7)	1:09.94 (7)	141.415
8	Dmitry Lobkov	Russia	35.46 (7)	1:10.57 (12)	35.53 (10)	1:10.30 (10)	141.425
9	Mark Tuitert	Netherlands	35.69 (13)	1:09.80 (6)	35.94 (17)	1:10.21 (9)	141.635
10	Tucker Fredricks	United States	35.10 (4)	1:11.37 (22)	35.54 (11)	1:11.07 (18)	141.860
11	Yu Fengtong	China	35.08 (3)	1:12.88 (27)	34.91 (2)	1:10.82 (15)	141.870
12	Lee Kang-seok	South Korea	35.47 (8)	1:10.88 (17)	35.31 (8)	1:11.34 (22)	141.890
13	Jamie Gregg	Canada	35.67 (11)	1:10.89 (18)	35.40 (9)	1:11.30 (21)	142.165
14	Kyle Parrott	Canada	35.89 (16)	1:10.80 (16)	35.73 (15)	1:10.39 (12)	142.215
15	Lee Ki-ho	South Korea	35.58 (9)	1:11.23 (21)	35.60 (13)	1:11.18 (20)	142.385
16	Yevgeny Lalenkov	Russia	36.39 (22)	1:10.26 (9)	36.18 (20)	1:09.52 (3)	142.460
17	Konrad Niedźwiedzki	Poland	36.24 (19)	1:10.37 (10)	36.17 (19)	1:10.32 (11)	142.755
18	Stefan Groothuis	Netherlands	38.06 (30)	1:09.32 (3)	35.59 (12)	1:09.70 (5)	143.160
19	Håvard Bøkko	Norway	36.27 (20)	1:10.60 (8)	36.49 (24)	1:10.41 (13)	143.345
20	Christoffer Fagerli Rukke	Norway	36.27 (20)	1:10.06 (13)	36.37 (23)	1:10.83 (16)	143.355
21	Nico Ihle	Germany	36.12 (18)	1:12.00 (25)	36.01 (18)	1:11.16 (19)	143.710
22	Samuel Schwarz	Germany	36.51 (23)	1:10.97 (19)	37.49 (28)	1:11.06 (17)	145.015
23	Takaharu Nakajima	Japan	35.82 (14)	1:11.59 (24)	36.27 (21)	1:15.08 (23)	145.425
24	Lee Kyou-hyuk	South Korea	34.96 (1)	1:09.47 (5)	35.16 (5)	NF	104.855
NQ25	Daniel Friberg	Sweden	37.00 (28)	1:11.57 (23)	36.72 (26)		109.505
NQ26	Philip Brojaka	United Kingdom	36.79 (26)	1:12.33 (26)	36.66 (25)		109.615
NQ27	Vladimir Sjerstjuk	Kazakhstan	36.99 (27)	1:13.43 (28)	36.91 (27)		110.615
NQ28	José Ignacio Fazio	Argentina	37.61 (29)	1:14.28 (29)	37.86 (29)		112.610
-	Maciej Ustynowicz	Poland	36.27 (20)	DQ	36.27 (21)		
-	Joel Eriksson	Sweden	36.74 (25)	1:11.11 (20)	NS		
-	Erben Wennemars	Netherlands	NF				

NQ = Not qualified for the second 1000m (only the best 24 are qualified)
DQ = disqualified
NF = Not Finished
NS = Not started

Source: ISU

== Rules ==
All participating skaters are allowed to skate the two 500 meters and one 1000 meters; 24 skaters may take part on the second 1000 meters. These 24 skaters are determined by the samalog standings after the three skated distances, and comparing these lists as follows:

1. Skaters among the top 24 on both lists are qualified.
2. To make up a total of 24, skaters are then added in order of their best rank on either list.
