= Phil Brojaka =

British speed skater

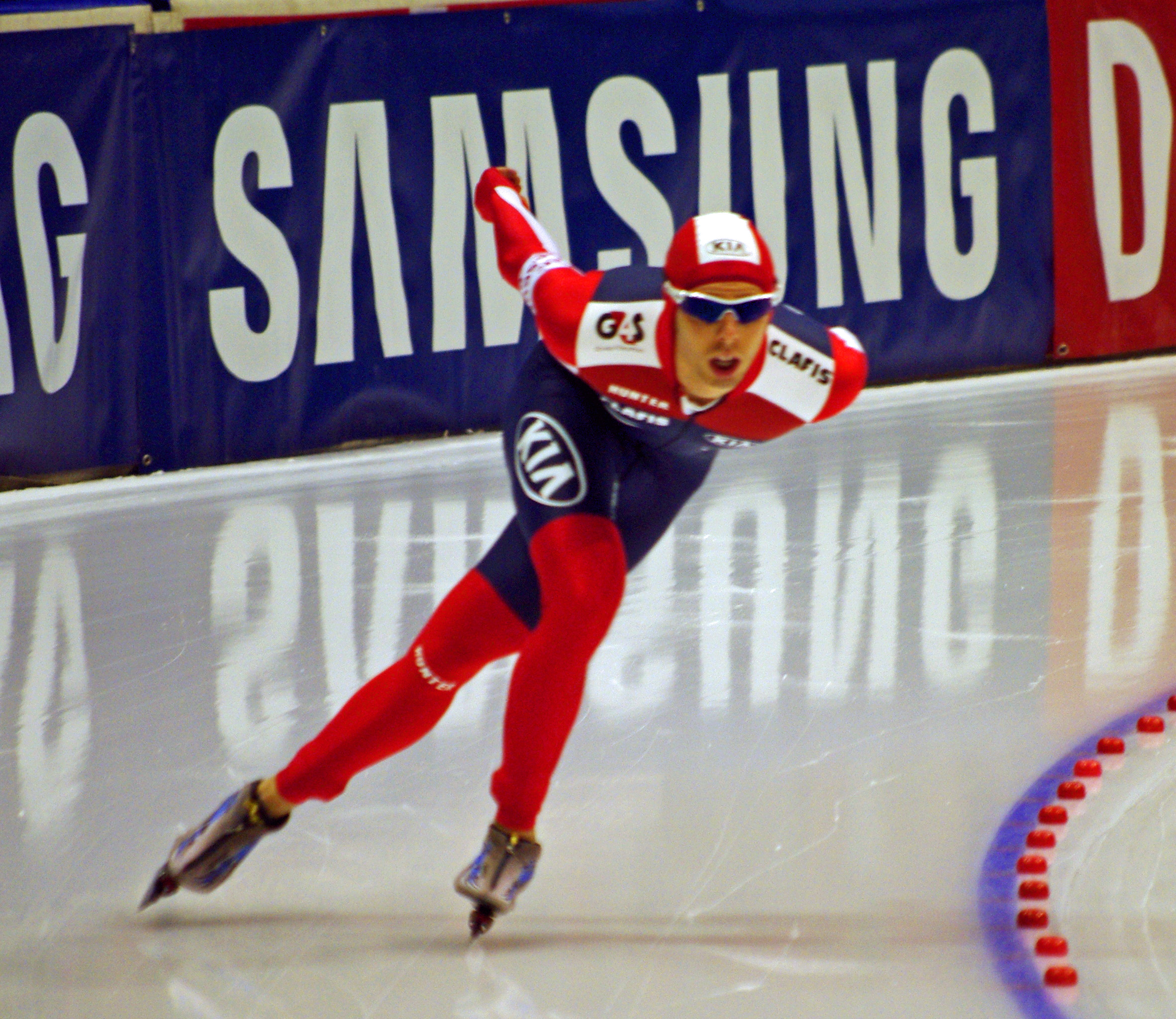
- Brojaka in 2009

Personal information
- Full name: Philip Brojaka
- Born: 7 May 1985 (age 41) Nottingham, United Kingdom

Sport
- Country: United Kingdom
- Sport: Speed skating
- Retired: 2018

Philip Brojaka (born 7 May 1985 in Nottingham) is a British former short track and long track speed skater, who was active between 2006 and 2018. As of 2020 he is assistant coach for the Dutch professional long track team Team Reggeborgh.

Brojaka initially trained with Bart Schouten's German team. Before he did long track speed skating, he was active in the short track for years, but long track speed skating made it easier for him to qualify for international competitions. In his own words, he tried long track speed skating on the advice of the American long track speed skater Shani Davis in 2005 after the World Short Track Championships. Within a few months after his transfer, Brojaka managed to ride under 1.50 in the 1500 meters (1.49.66 in Salt Lake City).

In November 2008 he took part in the World Cup competitions in Thialf. In the 2008/2009 season he made his debut at the 2009 European Allround Championships in Thialf, finishing in 24th place. At the World Sprint Championships later that season, he finished in 26th place. Brojaka trained in the 2009/2010 season with the Region of Groningen. After this Brojaka focused on assisting in Dutch inline skating and as a trainer of the short trackers of Region Friesland.

Brojaka represented the United Kingdom twice at the World Sprint Speed Skating Championships: in 2009, finishing 25th overall in 2011, finishing 36th overall. He participated at the European Speed Skating Championships in 2009. He also competed at other international competitions, including at ISU Speed Skating World Cups.

Between 2012 and 2016, he competed at national championships. He became a few times national champion in the 100 metres and 300 metres event. Furthermore, he won several silver and bronze medals at national championships.

== Records ==
=== Personal records (speed skating) ===
Personal records
Men's speed skating
Event	Result	Date	Location	Notes
500 m	36,43	21.03.2009	Salt Lake City	
1000 m	1.10,48	13.12.2009	Salt Lake City	
1500 m	1.49,66	14.03.2008	Salt Lake City	
3000 m	4.04,27	01.10.2010	Heerenveen	
5000 m	6.51,18	22.03.2009	Salt Lake City	
