= 2013 World Single Distance Speed Skating Championships – Men's 1500 metres =

Men's 1500 metres at the 2013 World Single Distance Speed Skating Championships
- Venue: Adler Arena, Sochi
- Date: 21 March 2013
- Competitors: 24 from 12 nations
- Winning time: 1:46.32

Medalists
gold medal	Denis Yuskov	Russia
silver medal	Shani Davis	United States
bronze medal	Ivan Skobrev	Netherlands

The men's 1500 metres race of the 2013 World Single Distance Speed Skating Championships was held on 21 March at 16:35 local time.

== Results ==
Rank	Pair	Lane	Name	Country	Time	Time behind	Notes
1st place, gold medalist(s)	11	i	Denis Yuskov	Russia	1:46.32		
2nd place, silver medalist(s)	9	i	Shani Davis	United States	1:46.83	+0.51	
3rd place, bronze medalist(s)	8	o	Ivan Skobrev	Russia	1:46.97	+0.65	
4	9	o	Brian Hansen	United States	1:47.40	+1.08	
5	10	o	Sverre Lunde Pedersen	Norway	1:47.44	+1.12	
6	12	i	Zbigniew Bródka	Poland	1:47.46	+1.14	
7	6	i	Mark Tuitert	Netherlands	1:47.61	1.29	
8	10	i	Konrad Niedźwiedzki	Poland	1:47.83	+1.51	
9	8	i	Haralds Silovs	Latvia	1:47.95	+1.63	
10	7	i	Kjeld Nuis	Netherlands	1:48.17	+1.85	
11	12	o	Håvard Bøkko	Norway	1:48.24	+1.92	
12	6	o	Yevgeny Lalenkov	Russia	1:48.33	+2.01	
13	11	o	Bart Swings	Belgium	1:48.39	+2.07	
14	7	o	Koen Verweij	Netherlands	1:48.42	+2.10	
15	5	o	Alexis Contin	France	1:48.50	+2.18	
16	5	i	Jan Szymański	Poland	1:48.65	+2.33	
17	4	o	Benjamin Macé	France	1:48.89	+2.57	
18	3	i	Denis Kuzin	Kazakhstan	1:49.12	+2.80	
19	2	o	Lucas Makowsky	Canada	1:49.15	+2.83	
20	1	i	Joo Hyong-jun	South Korea	1:49.24	+2.92	
21	2	i	Dmitry Babenko	Kazakhstan	1:49.61	+3.29	
22	4	i	Jonathan Kuck	United States	1:49.93	+3.61	
23	1	o	David Andersson	Sweden	1:50.62	+4.30	
24	3	o	Christoffer Fagerli Rukke	Norway	1:50.82	+4.50	
