= Hagaström =

Area of Gävle, Sweden

Coordinates: 60°40′N 17°04′E

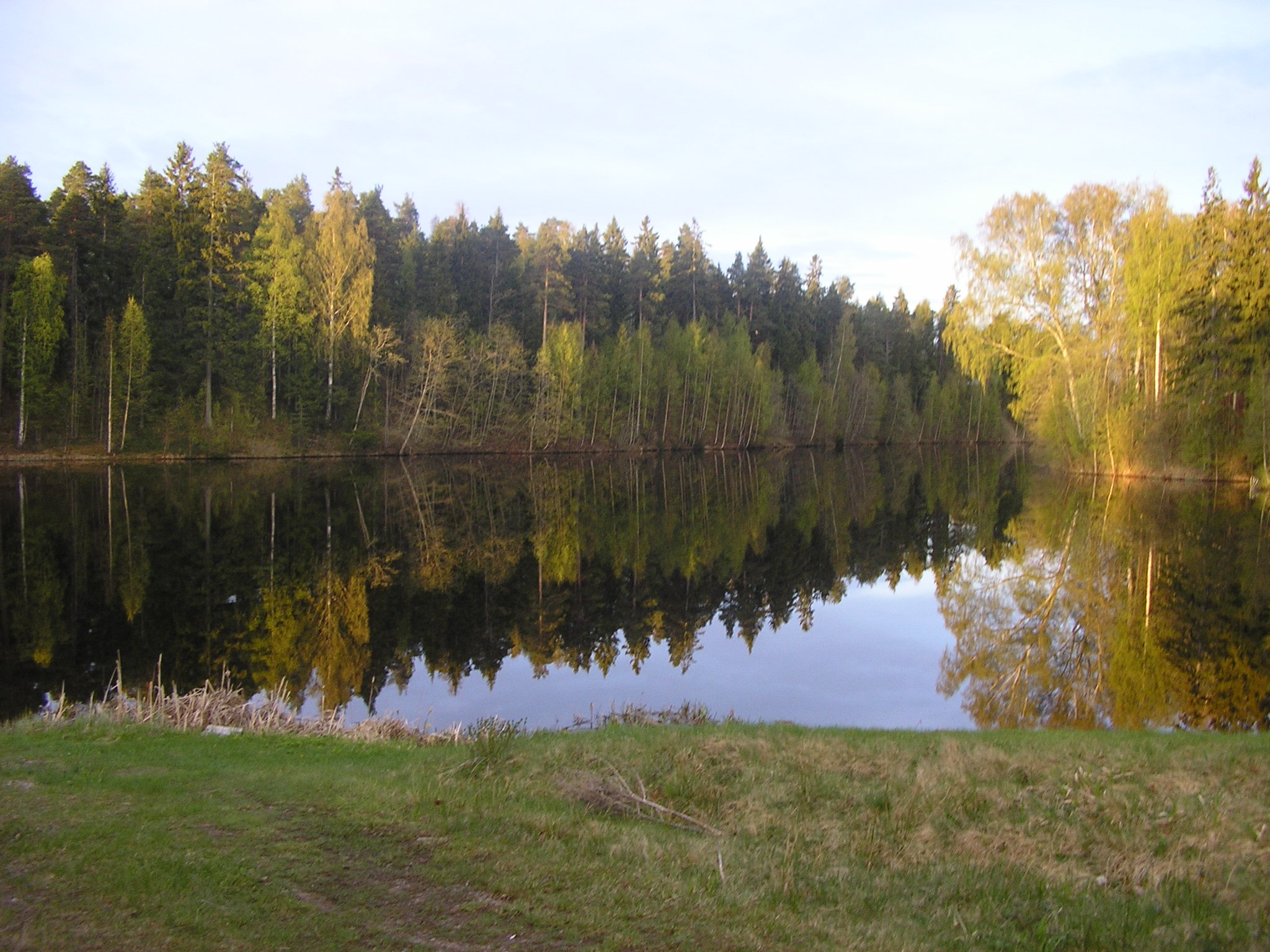
Gavleån, Hagaström

Hagaström is a part (pop. approx 2,000) of the city of Gävle, situated 5 km west of its centre, Gävle Municipality in east central Sweden. There is a smaller Coop grocery store, it is more commonly known under the name of Konsum. There is also a pizzeria in the same building as the grocery store, which is known as Hagaströms Pizzeria. Hagaströms southern boarder is represented by Gavleån, there is a hydro electric power plant and a small beach located in the neighborhood Duro.

Hagaström is a popular family neighbourhood and there are 3 pre-schools in the suburb. Hagaström's school is Hagaströmsskolan, which includes classes from pre-school to grade 6. The local sports club, Hagaströms SK, has football and ice hockey teams as well as a speed skating club. A 2.5 kilometer lit exercise track through the forest known as an "Elljuspåret" is located close to Hagaströms SK.

== Residential Zones ==
- Skuggan
- Tegelbruket
- Lindesnäs
- Stenbäck
- Bleke
- Duro
- Old Stenbäck
- Old Watertower
- The pizzeria

== History ==
Hagaström was named after the Haga manor house that was built in the area in 1855. The name was first used in 1891 when a brickworks was built by the wholesaler Sten Nordström from Gävle. Hagaströms Tegelbruks AB was in operation until 1972. A railway station on the Sala-Gysinge-Gävle Railway, designed by Sigge Cronstedt, was erected in 1900 and demolished in 1982. Among the companies established in Hagaström is the Duro wall paper company and the flower company Sörby that has 15,000 m2 of greenhouses.

== Famous People From Hagaström ==
- Stefan Åsberg, journalist
- Johan Markusson, Ice hockey player
- Inger Källgren Sawela, politician
- Martin Strömbergsson, football referee
- Markus Strömbergsson, football referee
- Johanna Östlund, ice skater
- Bo König, ice skater
- Ellenor Pierre, winner of Expedition Robinson 2009.
- Mora Träsk, musical band
