= Mike Blumel =

American speed-skater (born 1986)

Mike Blumel (born October 22, 1986) is an American speed-skater. His brother Mac also speed-skates. He is from Woodbury, Minnesota.

== See also ==
- American speed skaters
