= 2010–11 ISU Speed Skating World Cup – World Cup 4 =

The fourth competition weekend of the 2010–11 ISU Speed Skating World Cup was held in the Jilin Provincial Speed Skating Rink in Changchun, China, on 4–5 December 2010.

== Schedule of events ==
The schedule of the event is below:

Date	Time	Events
4 December	12:00 CET	500 m women 500 m men 1000 m women 1000 m men
5 December	12:00 CET	500 m women 500 m men 1000 m women 1000 m men

== Medal summary ==
=== Men's events ===
Event	Race #	Gold	Time	Silver	Time	Bronze	Time	Report
500 m	1	Lee Kang-seok; South Korea	35.10	Joji Kato; Japan	35.25	Keiichiro Nagashima; Japan	35.30	
500 m	2	Tucker Fredricks; United States	35.26	Jan Smeekens; Netherlands	35.27	Lee Kyou-hyuk; South Korea	35.32	
1000 m	1	Stefan Groothuis; Netherlands	1:09.57	Lee Kyou-hyuk; South Korea	1:10.10	Simon Kuipers; Netherlands	1:10.27	
1000 m	2	Stefan Groothuis; Netherlands	1:09.39	Simon Kuipers; Netherlands	1:10.11	Lee Kyou-hyuk; South Korea	1:10.13	

=== Women's events ===
Event	Race #	Gold	Time	Silver	Time	Bronze	Time	Report
500 m	1	Lee Sang-hwa; South Korea	38.24	Jenny Wolf; Germany	38.29	Nao Kodaira; Japan	38.51	
500 m	2	Lee Sang-hwa; South Korea	38.22	Yu Jing; China	38.27	Jenny Wolf; Germany	38.44	
1000 m	1	Christine Nesbitt; Canada	1:16.07	Heather Richardson; United States	1:17.49	Judith Hesse; Germany	1:18.04	
1000 m	2	Christine Nesbitt; Canada	1:16.55	Heather Richardson; United States	1:17.59	Nao Kodaira; Japan	1:17.98	
