= 2010–11 ISU Speed Skating World Cup – World Cup 5 =

The fifth competition weekend of the 2010–11 ISU Speed Skating World Cup was held in the Meiji Hokkaido-Tokachi Oval in Obihiro, Japan, on 11–12 December 2010.

== Schedule of events ==
The schedule of the event is below:

Date	Time	Events
11 December	13:45 CET	500 m women 500 m men 1000 m women 1000 m men
12 December	13:45 CET	500 m women 500 m men 1000 m women 1000 m men

== Medal summary ==
=== Men's events ===
Event	Race #	Gold	Time	Silver	Time	Bronze	Time	Report
500 m	1	Lee Kang-seok; South Korea	35.11	Keiichiro Nagashima; Japan	35.16	Akio Ota; Japan	35.16	
500 m	2	Joji Kato; Japan	34.96	Keiichiro Nagashima; Japan	35.19	Lee Kyou-hyuk; South Korea	35.19	
1000 m	1	Shani Davis; United States	1:09.56	Lee Kyou-hyuk; South Korea	1:09.80	Denny Morrison; Canada	1:10.39	
1000 m	2	Samuel Schwarz; Germany	1:09.98	Shani Davis; United States	1:10.15	Jan Bos; Netherlands	1:10.17	

=== Women's events ===
Event	Race #	Gold	Time	Silver	Time	Bronze	Time	Report
500 m	1	Lee Sang-hwa; South Korea	38.18	Yu Jing; China	38.21	Jenny Wolf; Germany	38.25	
500 m	2	Jenny Wolf; Germany	38.03	Lee Sang-hwa; South Korea	38.21	Yu Jing; China	38.30	
1000 m	1	Heather Richardson; United States	1:16.45	Nao Kodaira; Japan	1:17.33	Lee Sang-hwa; South Korea	1:17.87	
1000 m	2	Heather Richardson; United States	1:17.27	Nao Kodaira; Japan	1:17.77	Maki Tsuji; Japan	1:18.29	
