= 2010–11 ISU Speed Skating World Cup – World Cup 3 =

The third competition weekend of the 2010–11 ISU Speed Skating World Cup was held in the Vikingskipet Olympic Arena in Hamar, Norway, on 27–28 November 2010.

== Schedule of events ==
The schedule of the event is below:

Date	Time	Events
27 November	14:00 CET	1500 m men 5000 m women Team pursuit men
28 November	13:30 CET	1500 m women 10000 m men Team pursuit men

== Medal summary ==
=== Men's events ===
Event	Gold	Time	Silver	Time	Bronze	Time	Report
1500 m	Trevor Marsicano; United States	1:45.54	Simon Kuipers; Netherlands	1:45.97	Shani Davis; United States	1:45.98	
10000 m	Bob de Jong; Netherlands	13:05.83	Ivan Skobrev; Russia	13:11.26	Jorrit Bergsma; Netherlands	13:13.98	
Team pursuit	United States; Shani Davis; Jonathan Kuck; Trevor Marsicano	3:43.58	Canada; Lucas Makowsky; Denny Morrison; Justin Warsylewicz	3:44.61	Norway; Håvard Bøkko; Henrik Christiansen; Fredrik van der Horst	3:47.01	

=== Women's events ===
Event	Gold	Time	Silver	Time	Bronze	Time	Report
1500 m	Christine Nesbitt; Canada	1:58.00	Marrit Leenstra; Netherlands	1:58.03	Brittany Schussler; Canada	1:58.96	
5000 m	Stephanie Beckert; Germany	6:59.18	Martina Sáblíková; Czech Republic	7:03.95	Eriko Ishino; Japan	7:06.70	
Team pursuit	Canada; Cindy Klassen; Christine Nesbitt; Brittany Schussler	3:00.90	Russia; Yekaterina Lobysheva; Yekaterina Shikhova; Yuliya Skokova	3:03.90	Netherlands; Marije Joling; Marrit Leenstra; Jorien Voorhuis	3:04.62	
