= 2010–11 ISU Speed Skating World Cup – World Cup 7 =

The seventh competition weekend of the 2010–11 ISU Speed Skating World Cup was held in Salt Lake City, United States, on February 18–19, 2011.

Martina Sáblíková of the Czech Republic set a new world record on the women's 5000 metres.

== Schedule of events ==
The schedule of the event is below:

Date	Time	Events
February 18	13:00	1500 m men 5000 m women
February 19	13:00	1500 m women 10000 m men

== Medal summary ==
=== Men's events ===
Event	Gold	Time	Silver	Time	Bronze	Time	Report
1500 m	Trevor Marsicano; United States	1:43.35	Shani Davis; United States	1:43.38	Mark Tuitert; Netherlands	1:43.54	
10000 m	Bob de Jong; Netherlands	12:53.17	Lee Seung-hoon; South Korea	12:57.27	Bob de Vries; Netherlands	13:01.83	

=== Women's events ===
Event	Gold	Time	Silver	Time	Bronze	Time	Report
1500 m	Marrit Leenstra; Netherlands	1:53.38	Ireen Wüst; Netherlands	1:53.75	Christine Nesbitt; Canada	1:54.16	
5000 m	Martina Sáblíková; Czech Republic	6:42.66; WR	Stephanie Beckert; Germany	6:47.03	Eriko Ishino; Japan	6:55.07	
