= Joel Eriksson (speed skater) =

Swedish speed skater

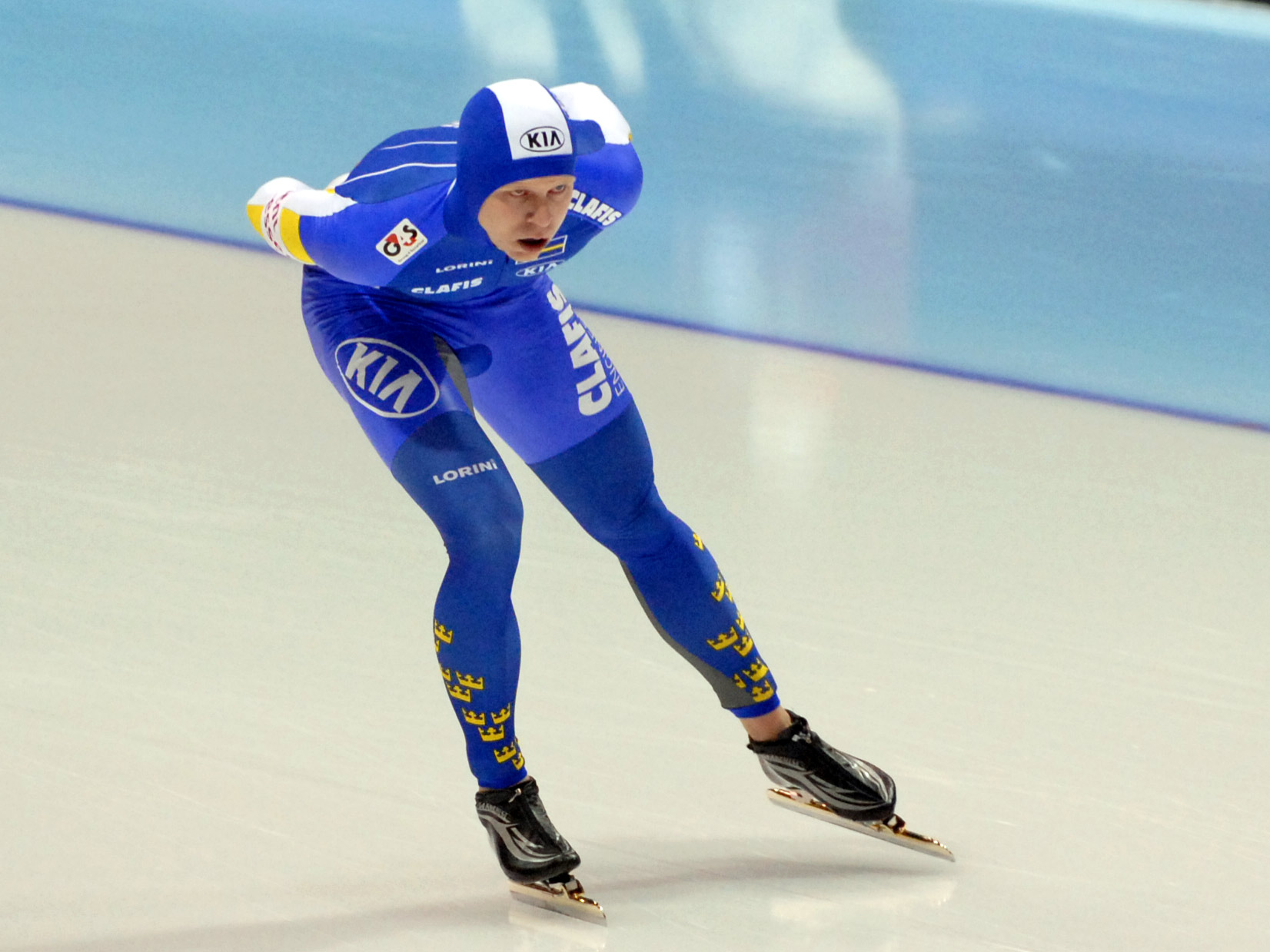
- Eriksson during the 2009 European Championships

Sport
- Sport: Speed skating

Joel Eriksson (born September 16, 1984 in Gothenburg) is a Swedish long track speed skater who participates in international competitions.

== Personal records ==
Personal records
Men's Speed skating
Event	Result	Date	Location	Notes
500 m	36.44	2007-11-11	Salt Lake City	
1,000 m	1:11.36	2007-01-20	Hamar	
1,500 m	1:47.57	2007-11-09	Salt Lake City	
3,000 m	3:53.26	2007-10-20	Berlin	
5,000 m	6:27.98	2007-11-17	Calgary	
10,000 m	14:40.52	2002-12-31	Salt Lake City	

=== Career highlights ===
World Sprint Championships
2007 - Hamar, 30th
European Allround Championships
2007 - Collalbo, 18th
2008 - Kolomna, 18th
2009 - Heerenveen, 13th
2010 - Hamar, 11th
World Junior Allround Championships
2003 - Kushiro, 28th
2004 - Roseville, Minnesota, 34th
National Championships
2006 - Hagaström, (gold) 1st at 1000 m sprint
2006 - Hagaström, (gold) 1st at 500 m sprint
2006 - Hagaström, (gold) 1st at sprint
2006 - Gothenburg, (silver) 2nd at 1500 m
2006 - Gothenburg, (bronze) 3rd at 10000 m
2006 - Gothenburg, (silver) 2nd at allround
2007 - Stockholm, (gold) 1st at sprint
2008 - Gothenburg, (silver) 2nd at allround
Nordic Junior Games
2003 - Hamar, (silver) 2nd at 3000 m
2003 - Hamar, (bronze) 3rd at 5000 m
