= Mikael Flygind Larsen =

Norwegian speed skater

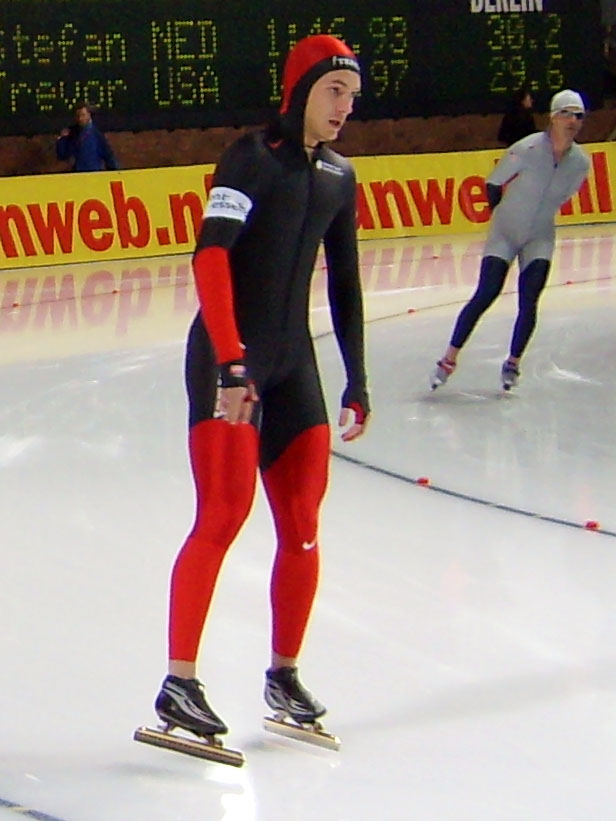
Mikael Flygind Larsen

Mikael Flygind Larsen (born 18 September 1982) is a Norwegian long track speed skater.

== Career ==
He competed for Norway at the 2010 Winter Olympics in the Men's 1000 m and Men's 1500 m. He finished 15th and 8th respectively.
