= Henrik Christiansen (speed skater) =

Norwegian speed skater

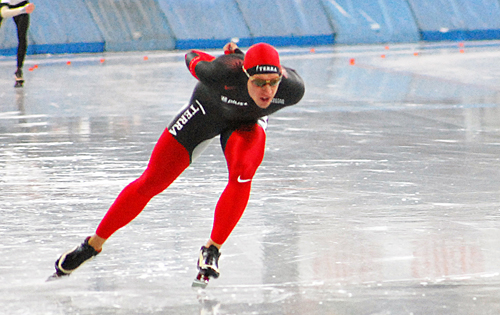
- 5000 meters. National single dist. Championship Hamar, 2 November 2008.

Personal information
- Born: 10 February 1983 (age 43)
- Website: Website of Henrik Christiansen

Sport
- Country: Norway
- Sport: Speed skating

Henrik Christiansen (born 10 February 1983) is a Norwegian long track speed skater. He represents the club Asker SK.

== Personal records ==
Personal records
Men's Speed skating
Event	Result	Date	Location	Notes
500 m	37.19	2011-02-12	Calgary	
1,000 m	1:11.50	2006-03-24	Calgary	
1,500 m	1:46.68	2011-02-13	Calgary	
3,000 m	3:47.04	2007-11-03	Salt Lake City	
5,000 m	6:15.44	2009-12-12	Salt Lake City	
10,000 m	13:21.61	2006-03-23	Calgary	

=== Career highlights ===
European Allround Championships
2007 - Collalbo, 9th
2008 - Kolomna, 11th
World Cup
2006 - Berlin, (silver) 2nd at team pursuit
World Junior Allround Championships
2002 - Collalbo, 23rd
National Championships
2004 - Asker, (bronze) 3rd at sprint
2007 - Hamar, (bronze) 3rd at 5000 m
2007 - Geithus, (silver) 2nd at allround
European Youth-23 Games
2004 - Gothenburg, (silver) 2nd at 1500 m
