= 2010–11 ISU Speed Skating World Cup – World Cup 8 =

The eighth and final competition weekend of the 2010–11 ISU Speed Skating World Cup was held in Heerenveen, Netherlands, from 4–6 March 2011.

== Schedule of events ==
The time schedule of the event stands below:

Date	Time	Events
4 March	15:00	500 m men 1500 m women 5000 m men
5 March	14:00	500 m women 1500 m men 3000 m women
6 March	14:00	500 m women 500 m men 1000 m women 1000 m men

== Medal summary ==
=== Men's events ===
Event	Race #	Gold	Time	Silver	Time	Bronze	Time	Report
500 m	1	Lee Kang-seok; South Korea	35.03	Lee Kyou-hyuk; South Korea	35.08	Jacques de Koning; Netherlands	35.18	
500 m	2	Lee Kyou-hyuk; South Korea	35.00	Yūya Oikawa; Japan	35.11	Lee Kang-seok; South Korea	35.12	
1000 m		Stefan Groothuis; Netherlands	1:08.66	Lee Kyou-hyuk; South Korea	1:09.00	Shani Davis; United States	1:09.21	
1500 m		Shani Davis; United States	1:45.92	Stefan Groothuis; Netherlands	1:46.09	Ivan Skobrev; Russia	1:46.59	
5000 m		Bob de Jong; Netherlands	6:18.62	Ivan Skobrev; Russia	6:22.50	Bob de Vries; Netherlands	6:24.44	

=== Women's events ===
Event	Race #	Gold	Time	Silver	Time	Bronze	Time	Report
500 m	1	Annette Gerritsen; Netherlands	38.31	Jenny Wolf; Germany	38.37	Lee Sang-hwa; South Korea	38.49	
500 m	2	Jenny Wolf; Germany	38.37	Lee Sang-hwa; South Korea	38.48	Annette Gerritsen; Netherlands	38.55	
1000 m		Ireen Wüst; Netherlands	1:15.76	Marrit Leenstra; Netherlands	1:16.19	Laurine van Riessen; Netherlands	1:16.37	
1500 m		Ireen Wüst; Netherlands	1:56.35	Marrit Leenstra; Netherlands	1:57.00	Christine Nesbitt; Canada	1:57.86	
3000 m		Martina Sáblíková; Czech Republic	4:06.21	Stephanie Beckert; Germany	4:08.03	Jorien Voorhuis; Netherlands	4:08.96	
