= Isabell Ost =

German speed skater

Peggy Crowe
Personal information
- Nationality: German
- Born: 21 October 1988 (age 36)

Sport
- Sport: Speed skating

Isabell Ost (born 21 October 1988) is a German speed skater. She competed in the women's 1500 metres at the 2010 Winter Olympics.
