= 2010–11 ISU Speed Skating World Cup – World Cup 1 =

The first competition weekend of the 2010–11 ISU Speed Skating World Cup was held in the Thialf arena in Heerenveen, Netherlands, from Friday, 12 November, until Sunday, 14 November 2010.

== Schedule of events ==
The schedule of the event is below:

| Date | Time | Events |
|---|---|---|
| 12 November | 16:30 CET | 500 m women 500 m men 1000 m women 1000 m men |
| 13 November | 13:30 CET | 500 m women 1500 m men 3000 m women |
| 14 November | 13:30 CET | 500 m men 1500 m women 5000 m men |

== Medal summary ==
=== Men's events ===
| Event | Race # | Gold | Time | Silver | Time | Bronze | Time | Report |
|---|---|---|---|---|---|---|---|---|
| 500 m | 1 | Joji Kato; Japan | 34.85 | Lee Kang-seok; South Korea | 35.00 | Lee Kyou-hyuk; South Korea | 35.01 | |
| 500 m | 2 | Keiichiro Nagashima; Japan | 34.97 | Joji Kato; Japan | 35.01 | Lee Kang-seok; South Korea | 35.10 | |
| 1000 m | | Shani Davis; United States | 1:08.40 | Stefan Groothuis; Netherlands | 1:08.51 | Simon Kuipers; Netherlands | 1:08.68 | |
| 1500 m | | Shani Davis; United States | 1:45.04 | Simon Kuipers; Netherlands | 1:45.48 | Mark Tuitert; Netherlands | 1:45.95 | |
| 5000 m | | Bob de Jong; Netherlands | 6:17.31 | Ivan Skobrev; Russia | 6:18.96 | Wouter olde Heuvel; Netherlands | 6:20.93 | |

=== Women's events ===
| Event | Race # | Gold | Time | Silver | Time | Bronze | Time | Report |
|---|---|---|---|---|---|---|---|---|
| 500 m | 1 | Jenny Wolf; Germany | 38.02 | Lee Sang-hwa; South Korea | 38.30 | Margot Boer; Netherlands | 38.39 | |
| 500 m | 2 | Jenny Wolf; Germany | 38.17 | Margot Boer; Netherlands | 38.54 | Nao Kodaira; Japan | 38.77 | |
| 1000 m | | Christine Nesbitt; Canada | 1:15.84 | Margot Boer; Netherlands | 1:16.50 | Ireen Wüst; Netherlands | 1:16.75 | |
| 1500 m | | Christine Nesbitt; Canada | 1:56.00 | Ireen Wüst; Netherlands | 1:57.35 | Marrit Leenstra; Netherlands | 1:57.68 | |
| 3000 m | | Stephanie Beckert; Germany | 4:04.38 | Cindy Klassen; Canada | 4:07.19 | Kristina Groves; Canada | 4:08.01 | |
