= 2010–11 ISU Speed Skating World Cup – World Cup 6 =

The sixth competition weekend of the 2010–11 ISU Speed Skating World Cup was held in the Krylatskoye Skating Hall in Moscow, Russia, on 28–30 January 2011.

== Schedule of events ==
The schedule of the event is below:

Date	Time	Events
28 January	13:00	500 m women 500 m men 3000 m women 1500 m men
29 January	13:00	500 m women 500 m men 1500 m women 5000 m men
30 January	12:30	1000 m women 1000 m men Team pursuit women Team pursuit men

== Medal summary ==
=== Men's events ===
Event	Race #	Gold	Time	Silver	Time	Bronze	Time	Report
500 m	1	Pekka Koskela; Finland	35.15	Jamie Gregg; Canada	35.23	Jacques de Koning; Netherlands	35.24	
500 m	2	Jan Smeekens; Netherlands	34.93	Akio Ota; Japan	35.02	Tucker Fredricks; United States	35.06	
1000 m		Stefan Groothuis; Netherlands	1:08.82	Denny Morrison; Canada	1:09.57	Mikael Flygind Larsen; Norway	1:09.65	
1500 m		Ivan Skobrev; Russia	1:45.49	Denny Morrison; Canada	1:46.25	Mark Tuitert; Netherlands	1:46.59	
5000 m		Bob de Jong; Netherlands	6:19.43	Ivan Skobrev; Russia	6:21.16	Håvard Bøkko; Norway	6:22.79	
Team pursuit		Russia; Ivan Skobrev; Pavel Baynov; Aleksandr Rumyantsev	3:43.71	Norway; Håvard Bøkko; Mikael Flygind Larsen; Sverre Lunde Pedersen	3:46.68	Germany; Patrick Beckert; Marco Weber; Robert Lehmann	3:47.15	

=== Women's events ===
Event	Race #	Gold	Time	Silver	Time	Bronze	Time	Report
500 m	1	Jenny Wolf; Germany	37.90	Margot Boer; Netherlands	38.56	Heather Richardson; United States	38.57	
500 m	2	Jenny Wolf; Germany	38.01	Margot Boer; Netherlands	38.49	Heather Richardson; United States	38.53	
1000 m		Christine Nesbitt; Canada	1:15.59	Ireen Wüst; Netherlands	1:15.94	Heather Richardson; United States	1:16.18	
1500 m		Christine Nesbitt; Canada	1:56.80	Ireen Wüst; Netherlands	1:56.93	Martina Sáblíková; Czech Republic	1:57.50	
3000 m		Martina Sáblíková; Czech Republic	4:04.03	Ireen Wüst; Netherlands	4:05.41	Brittany Schussler; Canada	4:10.45	
Team pursuit		Netherlands; Marrit Leenstra; Diane Valkenburg; Ireen Wüst	3:01.13	Norway; Ida Njåtun; Mari Hemmer; Hege Bøkko	3:03.02	Germany; Stephanie Beckert; Isabell Ost; Jennifer Bay	3:04.11	
