= Ivan Skobrev =

Russian speed skater

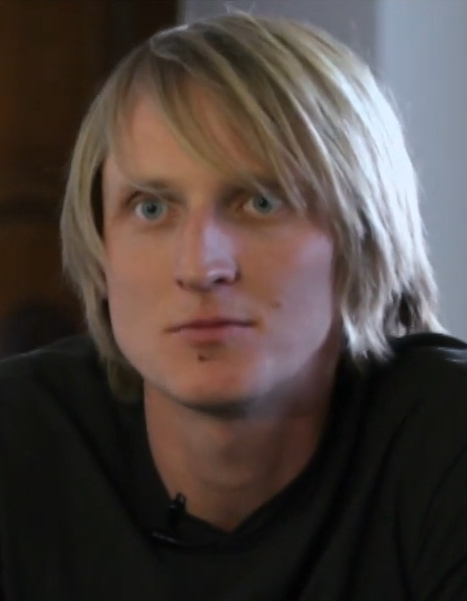
- Skobrev in 2014

Personal information
- Nationality: Russian
- Born: 8 February 1983 (age 43) Khabarovsk, Russian SFSR, Soviet Union
- Height: 1.87 m (6 ft 2 in)
- Weight: 85 kg (187 lb)

Sport
- Country: Russia
- Sport: Speed skating
- Turned pro: 2002
- Coached by: Maurizio Marchetto

Achievements and titles
- Personal bests: 500 m: 35.90 (2011); 1000 m: 1:10.88 (2007); 1500 m: 1:42.94 (2011); 3000 m: 3:44.92 (2005); 5000 m: 6:10.58 (2009); 10 000 m: 12:58.36 (2011)
Medal record
Men's speed skating
Representing Russia
Olympic Games
Silver medal – second place	2010 Vancouver	10000 m
Bronze medal – third place	2010 Vancouver	5000 m
World Allround Championships
Gold medal – first place	2011 Calgary	Allround
World Single Distance Championships
Silver medal – second place	2012 Heerenveen	1500 m
Bronze medal – third place	2011 Inzell	5000 m
Bronze medal – third place	2011 Inzell	10000 m
Bronze medal – third place	2012 Heerenveen	Team pursuit
Bronze medal – third place	2013 Sochi	1500 m
Bronze medal – third place	2013 Sochi	5000 m
European Championships
Gold medal – first place	2011 Collalbo	Allround
Bronze medal – third place	2010 Hamar	Allround
Winter Universiade
Silver medal – second place	2007 Turin	5000 m
Silver medal – second place	2007 Turin	Team pursuit

Ivan Aleksandrovich Skobrev (Russian: Иван Александрович Скобрев; born 8 February 1983 in Khabarovsk) is a Russian speed skater.

== Career ==
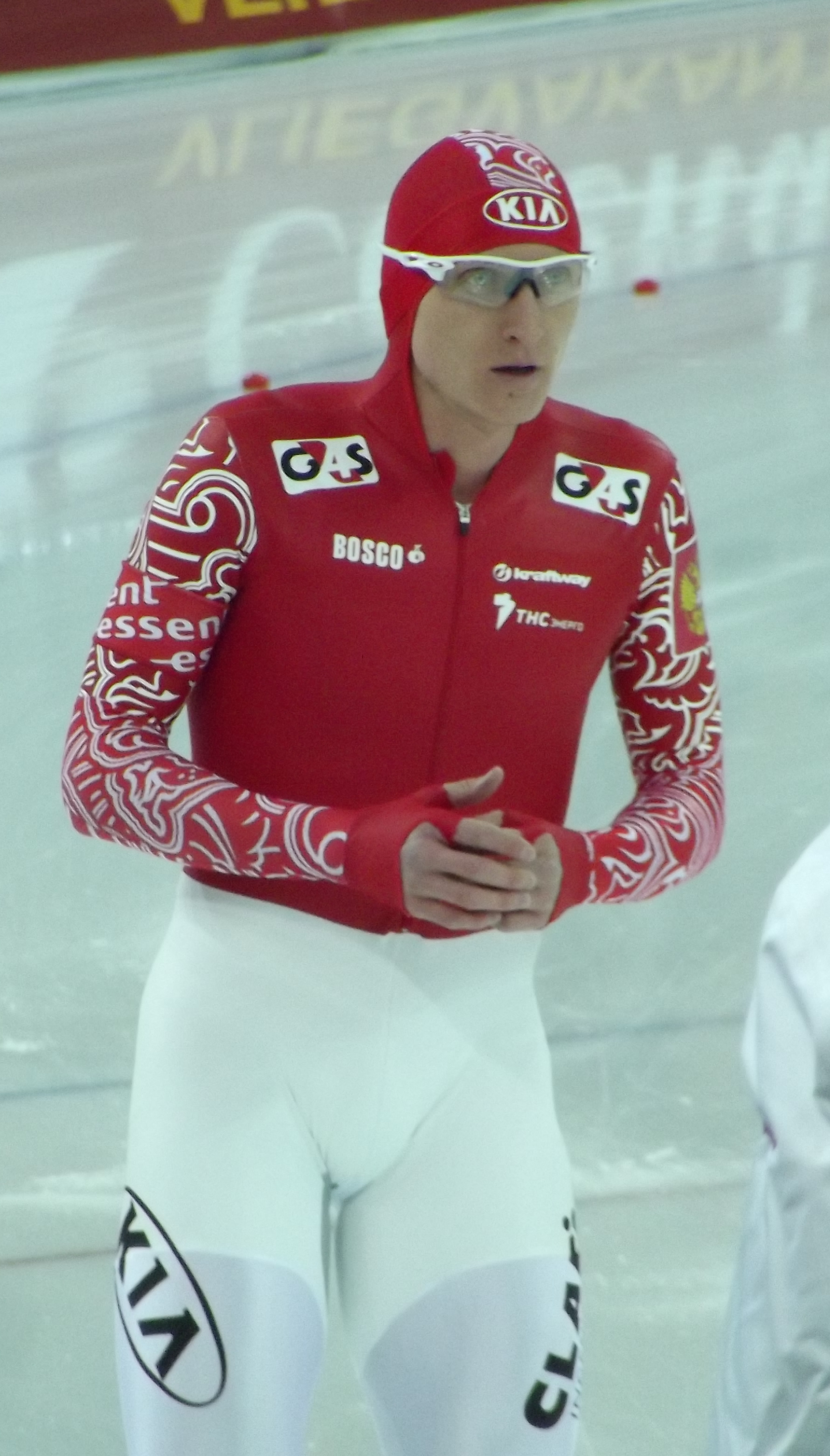
Skobrev at the 2013 World Single Distance Championships

At the 2010 Winter Olympics in Vancouver, he won the bronze medal in the 5000 meters as well as the silver medal in the 10000 meters. He is the 2011 European and World Allround Champion.

At the 2006 European Championships he finished in fifth place. He qualified for four distances for the 2006 Winter Olympics in Turin. He finished eleventh in the 5000 meters, sixth in the 1500 and 10000 meters and fifth in the team pursuit.

In December 2017, he was one of eleven Russian athletes who were banned for life from the Olympics by the International Olympic Committee, after doping offences at the 2014 Winter Olympics. The ban was subsequently overturned on appeal to the court of arbitration for sport (CAS).

He appeared in the fifth and ninth season of ice show contest Ice Age.

== Personal records ==
To put these personal records in perspective, the WR column lists the official world records on the dates that Skobrev skated his personal records.

Event	Result	Date	Venue	WR	Comments
500 m	35.90	12 February 2011	Calgary	34.30	World Allround Championships
1000 m	1:10.71	10 November 2012	Kolomna	1:06.42	Russia Cup
1500 m	1:42.94	13 February 2011	Calgary	1:42.32	WAC; National record until 2013-11-15
3000 m	3:38.26	2 November 2013	Calgary	3:37.28	Time trials (skated in quartet style)
5000 m	6:08.77	17 November 2013	Salt Lake City	6:03.32	World Cup; Current national record
10000 m	12:58.36	13 February 2011	Calgary	12:41.69	WAC; National record until 2017-11-19
Big combination	146.230	13 February 2011	Calgary	145.561	WAC; Current national record

With a score of 146.008 points, Skobrev is in 10th place on the Adelskalender as of March 10, 2019. He was in fifth place most of the time from February 12, 2011, to December 3, 2017.
