= 2010–11 ISU Speed Skating World Cup =

International speed skating competition

ISU Speed Skating World Cup
- Dates: 12 November 2010 – 6 March 2011

The 2010–11 ISU Speed Skating World Cup, officially the Essent ISU World Cup Speed Skating 2010–2011, was a series of international speed skating competitions which ran the entire season. The season started on 12 November 2010 in Heerenveen, Netherlands, and ended on 6 March 2011, also in Heerenveen. In total, eight competition weekends were held at seven different locations, ten cups were contested (five for men, and five for women), and 70 races took place.

The World Cup is organized by the International Skating Union (ISU).

== Calendar ==
WC #	City	Venue	Date	500 m	1000 m	1500 m	3000 m	5000 m	10000 m	Team pursuit
1	Heerenveen	Thialf	12–14 November	2m, 2w	m, w	m, w	w	m		
2	Berlin	Hohenschönhausen	19–21 November	2m, 2w	m, w	m, w	w	m		m, w
3	Hamar	Vikingskipet	27–28 November			m, w		w	m	m, w
4	Changchun	Jilin Provincial Speed Skating Rink	4–5 December	2m, 2w	2m, 2w					
5	Obihiro	Meiji Hokkaido-Tokachi Oval	11–12 December	2m, 2w	2m, 2w					
	Harbin	Heilongjiang Indoor Rink	28–29 December	2011 Asian Speed Skating Championships						
	Collalbo	Arena Ritten	7–9 January	2011 European Speed Skating Championships						
	Heerenveen	Thialf	22–23 January	2011 World Sprint Speed Skating Championships						
6	Moscow	Krylatskoye Skating Hall	28–30 January	2m, 2w	m, w	m, w	w	m		m, w
	Calgary	Olympic Oval	12–13 February	2011 World Allround Speed Skating Championships						
7	Salt Lake City	Utah Olympic Oval	18–19 February			m, w		w	m	
8	Heerenveen	Thialf	4–6 March	2m, 2w	m, w	m, w	w	m		
	Inzell	Eisstadion Inzell	10–13 March	2011 World Single Distance Speed Skating Championships						
Total				12m, 12w	8m, 8w	6m, 6w	4w	4m, 2w	2m	3m, 3w

Note: the men's 5000 and 10000 metres were contested as one cup, and the women's 3000 and 5000 metres were contested as one cup, as indicated by the color coding.

== World records ==
World records going into the 2010–11 season.

=== Men ===
Distance	Time	Nat.	Holder	Date	Venue	Reference
500 m	34.03	(Canada)	Jeremy Wotherspoon	9 November 2007	Utah Olympic Oval, Salt Lake City	
1000 m	1:06.42	(United States)	Shani Davis	7 March 2009	Utah Olympic Oval, Salt Lake City	
1500 m	1:41.04	(United States)	Shani Davis	11 December 2009	Utah Olympic Oval, Salt Lake City	
5000 m	6:03.32	(Netherlands)	Sven Kramer	17 November 2007	Olympic Oval, Calgary	
10000 m	12:41.69	(Netherlands)	Sven Kramer	10 March 2007	Utah Olympic Oval, Salt Lake City	
Team pursuit (8 laps)	3:37.80	(Netherlands)	Sven Kramer; Carl Verheijen; Erben Wennemars	11 March 2007	Utah Olympic Oval, Salt Lake City	

=== Women ===
Distance	Time	Nat.	Holder	Date	Venue	Reference
500 m	37.00	(Germany)	Jenny Wolf	11 December 2009	Utah Olympic Oval, Salt Lake City	
1000 m	1:13.11	(Canada)	Cindy Klassen	25 March 2006	Olympic Oval, Calgary	
1500 m	1:51.79	(Canada)	Cindy Klassen	20 November 2005	Utah Olympic Oval, Salt Lake City	
3000 m	3:53.34	(Canada)	Cindy Klassen	18 March 2006	Olympic Oval, Calgary	
5000 m	6:45.61	(Czech Republic)	Martina Sáblíková	11 March 2007	Utah Olympic Oval, Salt Lake City	
Team pursuit (6 laps)	2:55.79	(Canada)	Kristina Groves; Christine Nesbitt; Brittany Schussler	6 December 2009	Olympic Oval, Calgary	

At the World Cup stop in Salt Lake City on 18 February 2011, Martina Sáblíková of the Czech Republic set a new world record on the women's 5000 metres with a time of 6:42.66.

== Men's standings ==
=== 500 m ===
Rank	Name	Points
1	(South Korea) Lee Kang-seok	845
2	(South Korea) Lee Kyou-hyuk	745
3	(Japan) Joji Kato	671

=== 1000 m ===
Rank	Name	Points
1	(Netherlands) Stefan Groothuis	580
2	(South Korea) Lee Kyou-hyuk	522
3	(United States) Shani Davis	485

=== 1500 m ===
Rank	Name	Points
1	(United States) Shani Davis	440
2	(Norway) Håvard Bøkko	357
3	(Netherlands) Stefan Groothuis	342

=== 5000 and 10000 m ===
Rank	Name	Points
1	(Netherlands) Bob de Jong	610
2	(Russia) Ivan Skobrev	400
3	(Netherlands) Bob de Vries	356

=== Team pursuit ===
Rank	Name	Points
1	Norway	270
2	Russia	250
3	United States	232

== Women's standings ==
=== 500 m ===
Rank	Name	Points
1	(Germany) Jenny Wolf	1190
2	(South Korea) Lee Sang-hwa	875
3	(Netherlands) Margot Boer	735

=== 1000 m ===
Rank	Name	Points
1	(United States) Heather Richardson	605
2	(Canada) Christine Nesbitt	590
3	(Netherlands) Margot Boer	360

=== 1500 m ===
Rank	Name	Points
1	(Canada) Christine Nesbitt	575
2	(Netherlands) Marrit Leenstra	466
3	(Netherlands) Ireen Wüst	460

=== 3000 and 5000 m ===
Rank	Name	Points
1	(Czech Republic) Martina Sáblíková	510
2	(Germany) Stephanie Beckert	475
3	(United States) Jilleanne Rookard	351

=== Team pursuit ===
Rank	Name	Points
1	Netherlands	300
2	Germany	250
3	Norway	250
