= 2010–11 ISU Speed Skating World Cup – World Cup 2 =

The second competition weekend of the 2010–11 ISU Speed Skating World Cup was held in the Sportforum Hohenschönhausen in Berlin, Germany, from Friday, 19 November, until Sunday, 21 November, 2009.

== Schedule of events ==
The schedule of the event is below.

Date	Time	Events
19 November	15:30 CET	500 m women 500 m men 1500 m women 5000 m men
20 November	13:15 CET	500 m men 500 m women 3000 m women 1500 m men
21 November	13:15 CET	1000 m women 1000 m men Team pursuit women Team pursuit men

== Medal summary ==
=== Men's events ===
Event	Race #	Gold	Time	Silver	Time	Bronze	Time	Report
500 m	1	Joji Kato; Japan	35.03	Jan Smeekens; Netherlands	35.04	Lee Kang-seok; South Korea	35.10	
500 m	2	Pekka Koskela; Finland	34.90	Tucker Fredricks; United States	34.91	Lee Kang-seok; South Korea	35.13	
1000 m		Shani Davis; United States	1:08.82	Lee Kyou-hyuk; South Korea	1:09.08	Simon Kuipers; Netherlands	1:09.11	
1500 m		Håvard Bøkko; Norway	1:45.27	Trevor Marsicano; United States	1:46.15	Stefan Groothuis; Netherlands	1:46.31	
5000 m		Lee Seung-hoon; South Korea	6:18.40	Jonathan Kuck; United States	6:18.85	Håvard Bøkko; Norway	6:19.50	
Team pursuit		United States; Shani Davis; Trevor Marsicano; Jonathan Kuck	3:43.10	Norway; Håvard Bøkko; Henrik Christiansen; Sverre Lunde Pedersen	3:44.65	Netherlands; Wouter olde Heuvel; Koen Verweij; Bob de Vries	3:45.38	

=== Women's events ===
Event	Race #	Gold	Time	Silver	Time	Bronze	Time	Report
500 m	1	Jenny Wolf; Germany	38.08	Lee Sang-hwa; South Korea	38.24	Margot Boer; Netherlands	38.66	
500 m	2	Jenny Wolf; Germany	37.98	Margot Boer; Netherlands	38.46	Lee Sang-hwa; South Korea	38.56	
1000 m		Christine Nesbitt; Canada	1:15.86	Heather Richardson; United States	1:16.31	Margot Boer; Netherlands	1:16.51	
1500 m		Christine Nesbitt; Canada	1:57.03	Ida Njåtun; Norway	1:57.99	Ireen Wüst; Netherlands	1:58.93	
3000 m		Jilleanne Rookard; United States	4:04.38	Martina Sáblíková; Czech Republic	4:05.83	Stephanie Beckert; Germany	4:06.12	
Team pursuit		Germany; Isabell Ost; Jennifer Bay; Stephanie Beckert	3:04.91	Netherlands; Ireen Wüst; Jorien Voorhuis; Marije Joling	3:05.50	Norway; Ida Njåtun; Hege Bøkko; Mari Hemmer	3:06.67	
