= 2013–14 ISU Speed Skating World Cup – World Cup 2 – Women's 1500 metres =

The women's 1500 metres race of the 2013–14 ISU Speed Skating World Cup 2, arranged in the Utah Olympic Oval, in Salt Lake City, United States, was held on November 16, 2013.

Ireen Wüst of the Netherlands won the race, while Brittany Bowe and Heather Richardson, both of the United States, came second and third, respectively. Natalia Czerwonka of Poland won the Division B race.

== Results ==
The race took place on Saturday, November 16, with Division B scheduled in the morning session, at 10:18, and Division A scheduled in the afternoon session, at 14:51.

=== Division A ===
Rank	Name	Nat.	Pair	Lane	Time	WC points	GWC points
1st place, gold medalist(s)	Ireen Wüst	(Netherlands)	10	o	1:52.08	100	10
2nd place, silver medalist(s)	Brittany Bowe	(United States)	4	i	1:52.45	80	8
3rd place, bronze medalist(s)	Heather Richardson	(United States)	6	o	1:52.55	70	7
4	Lotte van Beek	(Netherlands)	10	i	1:53.05	60	6
5	Yuliya Skokova	(Russia)	7	o	1:53.87	50	5
6	Katarzyna Bachleda-Curuś	(Poland)	5	i	1:53.95	45	—
7	Yekaterina Lobysheva	(Russia)	9	o	1:54.092	40	
8	Ida Njåtun	(Norway)	8	i	1:54.094	36	
9	Monique Angermüller	(Germany)	5	o	1:54.17	32	
10	Yekaterina Shikhova	(Russia)	6	i	1:54.41	28	
11	Claudia Pechstein	(Germany)	7	i	1:54.54	24	
12	Maki Tabata	(Japan)	3	o	1:54.70	21	
13	Luiza Złotkowska	(Poland)	3	i	1:54.77	18	
14	Jorien Voorhuis	(Netherlands)	4	o	1:54.85	16	
15	Christine Nesbitt	(Canada)	8	o	1:55.04	14	
16	Nana Takagi	(Japan)	2	o	1:55.25	12	
17	Kali Christ	(Canada)	2	i	1:55.35	10	
18	Gabriele Hirschbichler	(Germany)	1	i	1:55.87	8	
19	Ayaka Kikuchi	(Japan)	1	o	1:56.80	6	
20	Martina Sáblíková	(Czech Republic)	9	i	2:51.62	5	

=== Division B ===
Rank	Name	Nat.	Pair	Lane	Time	WC points
1	Natalia Czerwonka	(Poland)	12	o	1:55.09	25
2	Brittany Schussler	(Canada)	15	i	1:55.19	19
3	Jilleanne Rookard	(United States)	12	i	1:55.31	15
4	Karolína Erbanová	(Czech Republic)	14	i	1:55.35	11
5	Nao Kodaira	(Japan)	13	o	1:55.72	8
6	Annouk van der Weijden	(Netherlands)	15	o	1:55.81	6
7	Noh Seon-yeong	(South Korea)	13	i	1:56.04	4
8	Kim Bo-reum	(South Korea)	14	o	1:56.12	2
9	Olga Fatkulina	(Russia)	2	i	1:56.22	1
10	Yekaterina Aydova	(Kazakhstan)	10	o	1:56.54	—
11	Yang Shin-young	(South Korea)	11	i	1:56.58	
12	Yuki Matsuda	(Japan)	10	i	1:56.88	
13	Zhao Xin	(China)	11	o	1:57.39	
14	Li Qishi	(China)	1	i	1:57.54	
15	Brianne Tutt	(Canada)	9	o	1:57.56	
16	Jelena Peeters	(Belgium)	8	i	1:57.67	
17	Mari Hemmer	(Norway)	5	o	1:58.16	
18	Katarzyna Woźniak	(Poland)	8	o	1:58.20	
19	Vanessa Bittner	(Austria)	2	o	1:58.76	
20	Kelly Gunther	(United States)	7	o	1:58.96	
21	Hege Bøkko	(Norway)	7	i	1:59.04	
22	Francesca Bettrone	(Italy)	9	i	1:59.28	
23	Kaitlyn McGregor	(Switzerland)	6	i	1:59.32	
24	Anna Chernova	(Russia)	6	o	1:59.51	
25	Johanna Östlund	(Sweden)	4	o	1:59.75	
26	Tatyana Mikhailova	(Belarus)	4	i	2:00.18	
27	Josie Spence	(Canada)	5	i	2:00.22	
28	Camilla Farestveit	(Norway)	3	o	2:00.28	
29	Yelena Urvantseva	(Kazakhstan)	1	o	2:01.66	
30	Nikola Zdráhalová	(Czech Republic)	3	i	2:02.38	
