= 2013–14 ISU Speed Skating World Cup – World Cup 2 – Women's 3000 metres =

The women's 3000 metres race of the 2013–14 ISU Speed Skating World Cup 2, arranged in the Utah Olympic Oval, in Salt Lake City, United States, was held on November 15, 2013.

Martina Sáblíková of the Czech Republic won the race, while Claudia Pechstein of Germany came second, and Antoinette de Jong of the Netherlands came third. De Jong's time of 3:59.49 was a new world record for juniors. Ayaka Kikuchi of Japan won the Division B race.

== Results ==
The race took place on Friday, November 15, with Division B scheduled in the morning session, at 08:45, and Division A scheduled in the afternoon session, at 15:16.

=== Division A ===
Rank	Name	Nat.	Pair	Lane	Time	WC points	GWC points
1st place, gold medalist(s)	Martina Sáblíková	(Czech Republic)	8	o	3:57.79	100	10
2nd place, silver medalist(s)	Claudia Pechstein	(Germany)	8	i	3:57.80	80	8
3rd place, bronze medalist(s)	Antoinette de Jong	(Netherlands)	7	i	3:59.49	70	7
4	Jorien Voorhuis	(Netherlands)	7	o	3:59.51	60	6
5	Linda de Vries	(Netherlands)	4	i	4:01.00	50	5
6	Ida Njåtun	(Norway)	6	o	4:01.47	45	—
7	Katarzyna Bachleda-Curuś	(Poland)	5	i	4:02.12	40	
8	Masako Hozumi	(Japan)	3	o	4:02.34	35	
9	Luiza Złotkowska	(Poland)	5	o	4:02.37	30	
10	Shiho Ishizawa	(Japan)	4	o	4:03.00	25	
11	Yvonne Nauta	(Netherlands)	6	i	4:03.50	21	
12	Olga Graf	(Russia)	2	i	4:04.29	18	
13	Nana Takagi	(Japan)	3	i	4:04.47	16	
14	Brittany Schussler	(Canada)	1	o	4:04.50	14	
15	Kim Bo-reum	(South Korea)	1	i	4:04.62	12	
16	Katarzyna Woźniak	(Poland)	2	o	4:09.53	10	

=== Division B ===
Rank	Name	Nat.	Pair	Lane	Time	WC points
1	Ayaka Kikuchi	(Japan)	17	i	4:03.04	32
2	Bente Kraus	(Germany)	16	i	4:03.672	27
2	Jilleanne Rookard	(United States)	19	i	4:03.672	27
4	Annouk van der Weijden	(Netherlands)	2	o	4:03.76	19
5	Jelena Peeters	(Belgium)	15	i	4:04.00	15
6	Francesca Lollobrigida	(Italy)	15	o	4:05.35	11
7	Natalia Czerwonka	(Poland)	16	o	4:05.40	9
8	Mari Hemmer	(Norway)	12	o	4:05.98	7
9	Jennifer Bay	(Germany)	18	o	4:06.19	6
10	Stephanie Beckert	(Germany)	18	i	4:06.42	5
11	Yuliya Skokova	(Russia)	19	o	4:07.00	4
12	Yang Shin-young	(South Korea)	12	i	4:07.02	3
13	Miho Takagi	(Japan)	14	o	4:07.18	2
14	Noh Seon-yeong	(South Korea)	13	o	4:07.86	1
15	Petra Acker	(United States)	8	i	4:09.05	—
16	Anna Rokita	(Austria)	13	i	4:09.08	
17	Viktoriya Filyushkina	(Russia)	11	i	4:09.41	
18	Brianne Tutt	(Canada)	10	o	4:09.62	
19	Anna Chernova	(Russia)	14	i	4:09.74	
20	Park Do-yeong	(South Korea)	10	i	4:10.18	
21	Isabell Ost	(Germany)	7	o	4:10.95	
22	Nicole Garrido	(Canada)	11	o	4:11.32	
23	Lada Zadonskaya	(Russia)	9	o	4:11.54	
24	Ivanie Blondin	(Canada)	17	i	4:11.56	
25	Liu Jing	(China)	5	i	4:11.73	
26	Camilla Farestveit	(Norway)	9	i	4:12.16	
27	Anna Ringsred	(United States)	6	i	4:12.49	
28	Jun Ye-jin	(South Korea)	7	i	4:15.12	
29	Daniela Oltean	(Romania)	6	o	4:15.23	
30	Tatyana Mikhailova	(Belarus)	5	o	4:16.66	
31	Sara Bak-Briand	(Denmark)	4	i	4:16.95	
32	Lauren McGuire	(Canada)	3	o	4:17.69	
33	Saskia Alusalu	(Estonia)	4	o	4:19.61	
34	Nikola Zdráhalová	(Czech Republic)	3	i	4:20.03	
35	Yelena Urvantseva	(Kazakhstan)	8	o	4:21.12	
36	Brooke Lochland	(Australia)	2	i	4:21.93	
37	Hege Bøkko	(Norway)	1	i	4:23.65	
