= 2013–14 ISU Speed Skating World Cup – Women's team pursuit =

The women's team pursuit in the 2013–14 ISU Speed Skating World Cup was contested over four races on four occasions, out of a total of six World Cup occasions for the season, with the first occasion taking place in Calgary, Alberta, Canada, on 8–10 November 2013, and the last occasion taking place in Heerenveen, Netherlands, on 14–16 March 2014. The races were over six laps.

The Dutch team went undefeated through the season, and won the cup with the maximum points possible, 450, and a margin of 135 points to the next team. Behind Netherlands, the Polish team took the silver, while Japan edged out Canada for the bronze, with a 5 points margin.

== Top three ==
Position	Country	Points	Previous season
1	Netherlands	450	1st
2	Poland	315	3rd
3	Japan	285	6th

== Race medallists ==
Occasion #	Location	Date	Gold	Time	Silver	Time	Bronze	Time	Report
1	Calgary, Alberta, Canada	10 November	Netherlands; Ireen Wüst; Lotte van Beek; Linda de Vries	2:57.82	Japan; Nana Takagi; Maki Tabata; Ayaka Kikuchi	2:58.53	Poland; Katarzyna Bachleda-Curuś; Luiza Złotkowska; Katarzyna Woźniak	2:59.42	
2	Salt Lake City, United States	17 November	Netherlands; Ireen Wüst; Antoinette de Jong; Linda de Vries	2:56.02	Canada; Christine Nesbitt; Brittany Schussler; Kali Christ	2:56.90	United States; Heather Richardson; Brittany Bowe; Jilleanne Rookard	2:57.09	
4	Berlin, Germany	8 December	Netherlands; Ireen Wüst; Jorien ter Mors; Marrit Leenstra	2:58.19	Poland; Katarzyna Bachleda-Curuś; Luiza Złotkowska; Natalia Czerwonka	3:01.18	South Korea; Noh Seon-yeong; Kim Bo-reum; Yang Shin-young]	3:02.04	
6	Heerenveen, Netherlands	16 March	Netherlands; Lotte van Beek; Marrit Leenstra; Linda de Vries	2:58.19	Poland; Katarzyna Bachleda-Curuś; Natalia Czerwonka; Luiza Złotkowska	3:01.18	Japan; Ayaka Kikuchi; Maki Tabata; Nana Takagi	3:02.04	

== Standings ==
Standings as of 16 March 2014 (end of the season).

#	Country	CAL	SLC	BER	HVN	Total
1	Netherlands	100	100	100	150	450
2	Poland	70	45	80	120	315
3	Japan	80	60	40	105	285
4	Canada	60	80	50	90	280
5	South Korea	50	40	70		160
6	Russia	45	50	60		155
7	United States	35	70	45		150
8	Norway	40	35	35		110
9	China	30	30	25		85
10	Germany	21	21	30		72
11	Italy	25	25	21		71
12	Czech Republic	18				18
