= 2013 World Single Distance Speed Skating Championships – Women's 3000 metres =

Women's 3000 metres at the 2013 World Single Distance Speed Skating Championships
- Venue: Adler Arena, Sochi
- Date: 21 March 2013
- Competitors: 24 from 10 nations
- Winning time: 4:02.43

Medalists
gold medal	Ireen Wüst	Netherlands
silver medal	Martina Sáblíková	Czech Republic
bronze medal	Claudia Pechstein	Germany

The women's 3000 metres race of the 2013 World Single Distance Speed Skating Championships was held on 21 March at 17:40 local time.

== Results ==
Rank	Pair	Lane	Name	Country	Time	Time behind	Notes
1st place, gold medalist(s)	11	o	Ireen Wüst	Netherlands	4:02.43		
2nd place, silver medalist(s)	11	i	Martina Sáblíková	Czech Republic	4:04.80	+2.37	
3rd place, bronze medalist(s)	12	o	Claudia Pechstein	Germany	4:07.75	+5.32	
4	12	i	Diane Valkenburg	Netherlands	4:08.12	+5.69	
5	9	i	Linda de Vries	Netherlands	4:09.53	+7.10	
6	8	o	Katarzyna Bachleda-Curuś	Poland	4:10.80	+8.37	
7	10	o	Stephanie Beckert	Germany	4:11.71	+9.28	
8	3	o	Bente Kraus	Germany	4:12.35	+9.92	
9	9	o	Kim Bo-reum	South Korea	4:12.69	+10.26	
10	7	i	Masako Hozumi	Japan	4:13.62	+11.19	
11	6	o	Yevgeniya Dmitriyeva	Russia	4:13.83	+11.40	
12	10	i	Olga Graf	Russia	4:14.58	+12.15	
13	1	i	Jelena Peeters	Belgium	4:14.71	+12.28	
14	7	o	Ida Njåtun	Norway	4:14.82	+12.39	
15	8	i	Ivanie Blondin	Canada	4:15.06	+12.63	
16	2	i	Brittany Schussler	Canada	4:15.72	+13.29	
17	4	i	Luiza Złotkowska	Poland	4:16.30	+13.87	
18	1	o	Park Do-yeong	South Korea	4:16.48	+14.05	
19	4	o	Cindy Klassen	Canada	4:16.87	+14.44	
20	5	i	Eriko Ishino	Japan	4:17.23	+14.80	
21	5	o	Natalia Czerwonka	Poland	4:18.98	+16.55	
22	3	i	Mari Hemmer	Norway	4:21.41	+18.98	
23	6	i	Yelena Sokhryakova	Russia	4:24.45	+22.02	
24	2	o	Noh Seon-yeong	South Korea	4:25.31	+22.88	
