= 2013–14 ISU Speed Skating World Cup – World Cup 1 – Women's team pursuit =

The women's team pursuit race of the 2013–14 ISU Speed Skating World Cup 1, arranged in the Olympic Oval, in Calgary, Alberta, Canada, was held on 10 November 2013.

The Dutch team won, while Japan came second, and Poland came third.

== Results ==
The race took place on Sunday, 10 November, in the morning session, scheduled at 13:52.

Rank	Country	Skaters	Pair	Lane	Time	WC points
1st place, gold medalist(s)	Netherlands	Ireen Wüst; Lotte van Beek; Linda de Vries	6	i	2:57.82	100
2nd place, silver medalist(s)	Japan	Nana Takagi; Maki Tabata; Ayaka Kikuchi	4	o	2:58.53	80
3rd place, bronze medalist(s)	Poland	Katarzyna Bachleda-Curuś; Luiza Złotkowska; Katarzyna Woźniak	5	i	2:59.42	70
4	Canada	Kali Christ; Ivanie Blondin; Brittany Schussler	6	o	2:59.84	60
5	South Korea	Kim Bo-reum; Noh Seon-yeong; Yang Shin-young	4	i	3:00.32	50
6	Russia	Yekaterina Shikhova; Yekaterina Lobysheva; Olga Graf	3	o	3:00.44	45
7	Norway	Ida Njåtun; Mari Hemmer; Hege Bøkko	3	i	3:00.97	40
8	United States	Brittany Bowe; Heather Richardson; Jilleanne Rookard	2	o	3:00.98	35
9	China	Zhao Xin; Liu Jing; Li Qishi	1	i	3:03.11	30
10	Italy	Francesca Bettrone; Paola Simionato; Francesca Lollobrigida	2	i	3:03.28	25
11	Germany	Claudia Pechstein; Bente Kraus; Monique Angermüller	5	o	3:03.31	21
12	Czech Republic	Karolína Erbanová; Martina Sáblíková; Nikola Zdráhalová	1	o	3:05.79	18
