= 2013–14 ISU Speed Skating World Cup – World Cup 4 – Women's team pursuit =

The women's team pursuit race of the 2013–14 ISU Speed Skating World Cup 4, arranged in Sportforum Hohenschönhausen, in Berlin, Germany, was held on 8 December 2013.

The Dutch team took their third straight victory from the start of the season, setting a new low-altitude record in the process, while the Polish team came second, and the South Korean team came third.

== Results ==
The race took place on Sunday, 8 December, in the afternoon session, scheduled at 16:48.

Rank	Country	Skaters	Pair	Lane	Time	WC points
1st place, gold medalist(s)	Netherlands	Ireen Wüst; Jorien ter Mors; Marrit Leenstra	6	i	2:58.19	100
2nd place, silver medalist(s)	Poland	Katarzyna Bachleda-Curuś; Luiza Złotkowska; Natalia Czerwonka	5	o	3:01.18	80
3rd place, bronze medalist(s)	South Korea	Noh Seon-yeong; Kim Bo-reum; Yang Shin-young	3	i	3:02.04	70
4	Russia	Yekaterina Lobysheva; Yekaterina Shikhova; Olga Graf	4	o	3:02.18	60
5	Canada	Brittany Schussler; Kali Christ; Ivanie Blondin	6	o	3:02.81	50
6	United States	Heather Richardson; Brittany Bowe; Jilleanne Rookard	4	i	3:03.02	45
7	Japan	Nana Takagi; Maki Tabata; Ayaka Kikuchi	5	i	3:03.53	40
8	Norway	Ida Njåtun; Hege Bøkko; Mari Hemmer	3	o	3:04.41	35
9	Germany	Claudia Pechstein; Monique Angermüller; Jennifer Bay	1	i	3:05.86	30
10	China	Zhao Xin; Li Qishi; Jia Ji	2	i	3:07.50	25
11	Italy	Francesca Lollobrigida; Francesca Bettrone; Paola Simionato	2	o	3:07.73	21
