= 2012–13 ISU Speed Skating World Cup – Women's team pursuit =

The women's team pursuit in the 2012–13 ISU Speed Skating World Cup was contested over four races on four occasions, out of a total of nine World Cup occasions for the season, with the first occasion taking place in Heerenveen, Netherlands, on 16–18 November 2012, and the final occasion also taking place in Heerenveen on 8–10 March 2013.

The Netherlands won the cup, while the defending champions, Canada, came second, and Poland came third.

== Top three ==
Medal	Country	Points	Previous season
Gold	Netherlands	400	6th
Silver	Canada	370	1st
Bronze	Poland	295	4th

== Race medallists ==
Occasion #	Location	Date	Gold	Time	Silver	Time	Bronze	Time	Report
1	Heerenveen, Netherlands	18 November	Germany; Stephanie Beckert; Isabell Ost; Claudia Pechstein	3:01.14	Netherlands; Marije Joling; Marrit Leenstra; Diane Valkenburg	3:02.332	Canada; Ivanie Blondin; Christine Nesbitt; Brittany Schussler	3:02.337	
3	Astana, Kazachstan	2 December	Canada; Ivanie Blondin; Christine Nesbitt; Brittany Schussler	2:58.40	South Korea; Kim Bo-reum; Noh Seon-yeong; Park Do-yeong	3:00.55	Netherlands; Marrit Leenstra; Diane Valkenburg; Linda de Vries	3:00.71	
8	Erfurt, Germany	3 March	Netherlands; Marrit Leenstra; Diane Valkenburg; Ireen Wüst	3:02.83	Canada; Ivanie Blondin; Kali Christ; Cindy Klassen	3:04.34	Poland; Katarzyna Bachleda-Curuś; Natalia Czerwonka; Luiza Złotkowska	3:05.23	
9	Heerenveen, Netherlands	8 March	Netherlands; Marrit Leenstra; Linda de Vries; Ireen Wüst; Diane Valkenburg	3:00.50	Canada; Kali Christ; Christine Nesbitt; Brittany Schussler; Ivanie Blondin	3:03.50	Poland; Katarzyna Bachleda-Curuś; Katarzyna Woźniak; Luiza Złotkowska; Natalia Czerwonka	3:04.19	

== Standings ==
Standings as of 10 March 2013 (end of the season).

#	Country	HVN1	AST	ERF	HVN2	Total
1	Netherlands	80	70	100	150	400
2	Canada	70	100	80	120	370
3	Poland	60	60	70	105	295
4	Germany	100	45	45	90	280
5	South Korea	50	80	30	–	160
6	Japan	45	40	50	–	135
7	Norway	40	50	40	–	130
8	Russia	35	0	60	–	95
9	Italy	25	–	35	–	60
10	United States	30	–	25	–	55
11	China	21	–	21	–	42
12	Kazakhstan	–	35	–	–	35
