= 2013–14 ISU Speed Skating World Cup – World Cup 2 – Women's team pursuit =

The women's team pursuit race of the 2013–14 ISU Speed Skating World Cup 2, arranged in the Utah Olympic Oval, in Salt Lake City, United States, was held on November 17, 2013.

The Dutch team – comprised by Ireen Wüst, Antoinette de Jong and Linda de Vries – won the race, while the Canadian team came second, and the American team came third.

== Results ==
The race took place on Sunday, November 17, in the afternoon session, scheduled at 16:23.

Rank	Country	Skaters	Pair	Lane	Time	WC points
1st place, gold medalist(s)	Netherlands	Ireen Wüst; Antoinette de Jong; Linda de Vries	6	i	2:56.02	100
2nd place, silver medalist(s)	Canada	Christine Nesbitt; Brittany Schussler; Kali Christ	5	o	2:56.90	80
3rd place, bronze medalist(s)	United States	Heather Richardson; Brittany Bowe; Jilleanne Rookard	3	o	2:57.09	70
4	Japan	Nana Takagi; Maki Tabata; Ayaka Kikuchi	6	o	2:57.26	60
5	Russia	Olga Graf; Yekaterina Lobysheva; Yekaterina Shikhova	4	o	2:57.84	50
6	Poland	Katarzyna Bachleda-Curuś; Luiza Złotkowska; Natalia Czerwonka	5	i	2:58.01	45
7	South Korea	Kim Bo-reum; Noh Seon-yeong; Park Do-yeong	4	i	2:58.32	40
8	Norway	Ida Njåtun; Hege Bøkko; Mari Hemmer	3	i	2:59.47	35
9	China	Zhao Xin; Liu Jing; Li Qishi	2	i	3:00.21	30
10	Italy	Francesca Lollobrigida; Francesca Bettrone; Paola Simionato	2	o	3:00.83	25
11	Germany	Claudia Pechstein; Bente Kraus; Jennifer Bay	1	i	3:00.85	21
