= 2013 World Single Distance Speed Skating Championships – Women's 1500 metres =

Women's 1500 metres at the 2013 World Single Distance Speed Skating Championships
- Venue: Adler Arena, Sochi
- Date: 22 March 2013
- Competitors: 18 from 10 nations
- Winning time: 1:55.38

Medalists
gold medal	Ireen Wüst	Netherlands
silver medal	Lotte van Beek	Netherlands
bronze medal	Christine Nesbitt	Canada

The women's 1500 metres race of the 2013 World Single Distance Speed Skating Championships was held on 22 March at 15:55 local time.

== Results ==
Rank	Pair	Lane	Name	Country	Time	Time behind	Notes
1st place, gold medalist(s)	8	i	Ireen Wüst	Netherlands	1:55.38		
2nd place, silver medalist(s)	9	o	Lotte van Beek	Netherlands	1:58.02	+2.64	
3rd place, bronze medalist(s)	8	o	Christine Nesbitt	Canada	1:58.07	+2.69	
4	9	i	Diane Valkenburg	Netherlands	1:58.37	+2.99	
5	6	o	Kali Christ	Canada	1:58.69	+3.31	
6	3	o	Karolína Erbanová	Czech Republic	1:59.021	+3.64	
7	3	i	Yuliya Skokova	Russia	1:59.027	+3.64	
8	5	i	Brittany Schussler	Canada	1:59.04	+3.66	
9	7	i	Katarzyna Bachleda-Curuś	Poland	1:59.13	+3.75	
10	2	o	Monique Angermüller	Germany	1:59.14	+3.76	
11	4	o	Kim Bo-reum	South Korea	1:59.15	+3.77	
12	4	i	Ida Njåtun	Norway	1:59.31	+3.93	
13	2	i	Miho Takagi	Japan	1:59.55	+4.17	
14	7	o	Yekaterina Lobysheva	Russia	1:59.72	+4.34	
15	6	i	Yekaterina Shikhova	Russia	2:00.24	+4.86	
16	1	i	Luiza Złotkowska	Poland	2:00.44	+5.06	
17	5	o	Natalia Czerwonka	Poland	2:00.84	+5.46	
18	1	o	Anna Ringsred	United States	2:04.10	+8.72	
