= 2011–12 ISU Speed Skating World Cup – Women's team pursuit =

The women's team pursuit in the 2011–12 ISU Speed Skating World Cup was contested over four races on four occasions, out of a total of seven World Cup occasions for the season, with the first occasion taking place in Chelyabinsk, Russia, on 18–20 November 2011, and the final occasion taking place in Berlin, Germany, on 9–11 March 2012.

Canada won the cup, while Russia came second and South Korea came third. The defending champions, Netherlands, ended up in 6th place.

== Top three ==
Medal	Country	Points	Previous season
Gold	Canada	390	5th
Silver	Russia	355	4th
Bronze	South Korea	320	9th

== Race medallists ==
Occasion #	Location	Date	Gold	Time	Silver	Time	Bronze	Time	Report
1	Chelyabinsk, Russia	20 November	Canada; Brittany Schussler; Cindy Klassen; Christine Nesbitt	3:02.07	Netherlands; Ireen Wüst; Diane Valkenburg; Marrit Leenstra	3:02.72	Russia; Yuliya Skokova; Yekaterina Lobysheva; Yekaterina Shikhova	3:03.37	
3	Heerenveen, Netherlands	4 December	Canada; Brittany Schussler; Christine Nesbitt; Cindy Klassen	3:00.01	Russia; Yekaterina Lobysheva; Yekaterina Shikhova; Yuliya Skokova	3:02.38	South Korea; Lee Ju-yeon; Noh Seon-yeong; Kim Bo-reum	3:03.18	
5	Hamar, Norway	12 February	Russia; Yekaterina Lobysheva; Yekaterina Shikhova; Yuliya Skokova	3:04.83	Poland; Natalia Czerwonka; Luiza Złotkowska; Katarzyna Woźniak	3:05.57	South Korea; Kim Bo-reum; Lee Ju-yeon; Noh Seon-yeong	3:05.65	
7	Berlin, Germany	11 March	Canada; Cindy Klassen; Christine Nesbitt; Brittany Schussler	3:01.03	South Korea; Kim Bo-reum; Lee Ju-yeon; Noh Seon-yeong	3:03.29	Russia; Yekaterina Lobysheva; Yekaterina Shikhova; Yuliya Skokova	3:04.51	

== Standings ==
Standings as of 11 March 2012 (end of the season).

#	Name	CHE	HVN	HAM	BER	Total
1	Canada	100	100	40	150	390
2	Russia	70	80	100	105	355
3	South Korea	60	70	70	120	320
4	Poland	45	50	80	90	265
5	Japan	40	60	50	–	150
6	Netherlands	80	0	60	–	140
7	Germany	50	40	32	–	122
8	United States	36	36	36	–	108
9	Norway	–	45	45	–	90
