= 2012 World Single Distance Speed Skating Championships – Women's team pursuit =

The women's team pursuit race of the 2012 World Single Distance Speed Skating Championships was held on March 25.

== Results ==
Rank	Pair	Country	Athletes	Time	Deficit	Notes
1st place, gold medalist(s)	2	Netherlands	Ireen Wüst; Diane Valkenburg; Linda de Vries	2:59.70		
2nd place, silver medalist(s)	3	Canada	Brittany Schussler; Christine Nesbitt; Cindy Klassen	3:00.51	+0.81	
3rd place, bronze medalist(s)	4	Poland	Natalia Czerwonka; Katarzyna Woźniak; Luiza Złotkowska	3:03.31	+3.61	
4	4	Russia	Yekaterina Lobysheva; Yekaterina Shikhova; Yuliya Skokova	3:03.44	+3.74	
5	1	Germany	Stephanie Beckert; Claudia Pechstein; Isabell Ost	3:03.63	+3.93	
6	3	Korea	Lee Ju-youn; Noh Seon-yeong; Kim Bo-reum	3:03.86	+4.16	
7	2	Japan	Masako Hozumi; Miho Takagi; Nao Kodaira	3:04.10	+4.40	
8	1	United States	Jilleanne Rookard; Heather Richardson; Maria Lamb	3:07.22	+7.52	
