= 2016–17 ISU Speed Skating World Cup – Women's 3000 and 5000 metres =

The 3000 and 5000 meters distance for women in the 2016–17 ISU Speed Skating World Cup will be contested over six races on six occasions, out of a total of World Cup occasions for the season, with the first occasion taking place in Harbin, Canada, on 11–13 November 2016, and the final occasion taking place in Stavanger, Norway, on 11–12 March 2017.

The defending champion Martina Sáblíková of Czech Republic defends her World Cup title by winning 5 of 6 World Cup races.

== Top three ==
Position	Athlete	Points	Previous season
1	(Czech Republic) Martina Sáblíková	630	1st
2	(Russia) Anna Yurakova	395	23rd
3	(Netherlands) Antoinette de Jong	360	30th

== Race medallists ==
WC #	Location	Date	Distance	Gold	Time	Silver	Time	Bronze	Time	Report
1	Harbin, China	11 November	3000 metres	Martina Sáblíková; Czech Republic	4:08.26	Marije Joling; Netherlands	4:09.40	Ivanie Blondin; Canada	4:09.78	
2	Nagano, Japan	18 November	3000 metres	Martina Sáblíková; Czech Republic	4:03.56	Antoinette de Jong; Netherlands	4:04.53	Anna Yurakova; Russia	4:05.24	
3	Astana, Kazakhstan	2 December	3000 metres	Martina Sáblíková; Czech Republic	4:02.90	Anna Yurakova; Russia	4:03.84	Miho Takagi; South Korea	4:05.68	
4	Heerenveen, Netherlands	11 December	5000 metres	Martina Sáblíková; Czech Republic	6:57.64	Claudia Pechstein; Germany	7:00.82	Miho Takagi; South Korea	7:02.51	
5	Berlin, Germany	29 January	3000 metres	Ireen Wüst; Netherlands	4:01.77	Martina Sáblíková; Czech Republic	4:02.38	Anna Yurakova; Russia	4:04.64	
6	Stavanger, Norway	11 March	3000 metres	Martina Sáblíková; Czech Republic	4:04.21	Antoinette de Jong; Netherlands	4:05.35	Melissa Wijfje; Czech Republic	4:05.59	

== Standings ==
#	Name	Nat.	HRB	NGN	AST	HVN	BER	STA	Total
1	Martina Sáblíková	(Czech Republic)	100	100	100	100	80	150	630
2	Anna Yurakova	(Russia)	35	70	80	50	70	90	395
3	Antoinette de Jong	(Netherlands)	60	80	50	—	50	120	360
4	Melissa Wijfje	(Netherlands)	45	30	40	70	35	104	324
5	Claudia Pechstein	(Germany)	32	60	45	80	30	32	279
6	Marije Joling	(Netherlands)	80	35	18	—	60	76	269
7	Bente Kraus	(Germany)	50	21	30	45	40	40	226
8	Ivanie Blondin	(Canada)	70	—	60	25	21	45	221
9	Ireen Wüst	(Netherlands)	40	50	—	—	100	—	190
10	Olga Graf	(Russia)	16	18	27	19	45	36	161
11	Miho Takagi	(Japan)	25	40	70	—	18	—	153
12	Natalia Voronina	(Russia)	14	32	21	35	12	28	142
13	Marina Zueva	(Belarus)	14	32	21	35	12	28	127
14	Francesca Lollobrigida	(Italy)	27	25	12	21	14	24	123
15	Isabelle Weidemann	(Canada)	30	12	35	40	—	—	117
16	Bo-Reum Kim	(South Korea)	23	45	14	18	—	—	100
17	Carlijn Achtereekte	(Netherlands)	10	27	—	32	16	—	85
18	Mia Manganello	(United States)	15	23	16	23	—	—	77
19	Linda de Vries	(Netherlands)	—	—	32	30	—	—	62
20	Irene Schouten	(Netherlands)	—	—	—	60	—	—	60
21	Ida Njåtun	(Norway)	12	9	4	—	27	—	52
22	Jelena Peeters	(Belgium)	9	19	—	11	10	—	49
23	Misaki Oshigiri	(Japan)	21	14	10	—	—	—	45
24	Ayano Sato	(Japan)	11	15	7	—	9	—	42
25	Fuyo Matsuoka	(Japan)	18	10	1	6	5	—	40
26	Natalia Czerwonka	(Poland)	—	—	6	—	32	—	38
27	Nikola Zdráhalová	(Czech Republic)	0	5	15	9	4	—	33
28	Katarzyna Bachleda-Curuś	(Poland)	6	6	—	—	19	—	31
29	Stephanie Beckert	(Germany)	—	—	23	—	7	—	30
30	Mei Han	(China)	0	3	0	4	23	—	30
31	Katarzyna Woźniak	(Poland)	0	0	11	—	15	—	26
32	Annouk van der Weijden	(Netherlands)	—	—	25	—	—	—	25
33	Luiza Złotkowska	(Poland)	4	7	3	—	11	—	25
34	Maki Tabata	(Japan)	7	4	9	—	3	—	23
35	Magdalena Czyszczoń	(Poland)	2	2	5	7	2	—	18
36	Brianne Tutt	(Canada)	5	11	0	—	—	—	16
37	Mai Kiyama	(Japan)	—	—	—	15	—	—	15
38	Nana Takagi	(Japan)	—	—	—	—	6	—	6
39	Shoko Fujimura	(Japan)	—	—	—	5	—	—	5
40	Jiachen Hao	(China)	3	0	0	1	—	—	4
41	Nana Takahashi	(Japan)	—	—	—	3	—	—	3
42	Sofie Karoline Haugen	(Norway)	—	—	—	2	1	—	3
43	Yuliya Skokova	(South Korea)	—	—	2	—	—	—	2
44	Elizaveta Kazelina	(Russia)	—	1	—	—	0	—	1
45	Jing Liu	(China)	1	0	0	0	—	—	1
