= 2015–16 ISU Speed Skating World Cup – World Cup 1 – Women's team pursuit =

The women's team pursuit race of the 2015–16 ISU Speed Skating World Cup 1, arranged in the Olympic Oval, in Calgary, Alberta, Canada, was held on 14 November 2015.

The Dutch team won the race, while the Japanese team came second, and the Russian team came third.

== Results ==
The race took place on Saturday, 14 November, in the afternoon session, scheduled at 15:07.

Rank	Country	Skaters	Pair	Lane	Time	WC points
1st place, gold medalist(s)	Netherlands	Marrit Leenstra; Antoinette de Jong; Marije Joling	5	f	2:56.11	100
2nd place, silver medalist(s)	Japan	Ayaka Kikuchi; Miho Takagi; Misaki Oshigiri	4	c	2:56.46 NR	80
3rd place, bronze medalist(s)	Russia	Olga Graf; Natalya Voronina; Elizaveta Kazelina	3	f	2:56.98 NR	70
4	Canada	Ivanie Blondin; Josie Spence; Isabelle Weidemann	3	c	2:59.17	60
5	South Korea	Kim Bo-reum; Noh Seon-yeong; Park Do-yeong	2	f	2:59.25	50
6	Germany	Claudia Pechstein; Gabriele Hirschbichler; Roxanne Dufter	5	c	3:00.33	45
7	China	Zhao Xin; Hao Jiachen; Liu Jing	2	c	3:01.30	40
8	Poland	Natalia Czerwonka; Katarzyna Woźniak; Luiza Złotkowska	4	f	3:01.50	35
9	Czech Republic	Nikola Zdráhalová; Martina Sáblíková; Natálie Kerschbaummeyr	1	f	3:02.50 NR	30
10	United States	Erin Bartlett; Paige Schwartzburg; Kelly Gunther	1	c	3:09.37	25

Note: NR = national record.
