= List of Polish records in speed skating =

The following are the national records in speed skating in Poland maintained by the Polish Speed Skating Association (PZŁS).

== Men ==
Key to tables: Awaiting ratification Record not kept by PZŁS Not ratified or later rescinded by PZŁS

Event	Record	Athlete	Date	Meet	Place	Ref
500 meters	33.85	Damian Żurek	23 November 2025	World Cup	Calgary, Canada	
500 meters × 2	69.80	Artur Waś	15 February 2015	World Single Distance Championships	Heerenveen, Netherlands	
1000 meters	1:06.02	Damian Żurek	14 November 2025	World Cup	Salt Lake City, United States	
1500 meters	1:42.89	Zbigniew Bródka	15 November 2013	World Cup	Salt Lake City, United States	
3000 meters	3:35.15	Vladimir Semirunniy	27 September 2026		Heerenveen, Netherlands	
5000 meters	6:07.81	Vladimir Semirunniy	24 January 2026	World Cup	Inzell, Germany	
10000 meters	12:28.05	Vladimir Semirunniy	6 December 2025	World Cup	Heerenveen, Netherlands	
Team sprint (3 laps)	1:17.37	Marek Kania; Piotr Michalski; Damian Żurek	15 February 2024	World Single Distances Championships	Calgary, Canada	
Team pursuit (8 laps)	3:40.52	Vladimir Semirunniy; Szymon Palka; Marcin Bachanek	16 November 2025	World Cup	Salt Lake City, United States	
Sprint combination	138.190 pts	Damian Żurek	10–11 January 2025	European Championships	Heerenveen, Netherlands	
Small combination	149.184 pts	Mateusz Śliwka	20–22 March 2025	Olympic Oval Finale	Calgary, Canada	
Big combination	146.243 pts	Vladimir Semirunniy	7–8 March 2026	World Allround Championships	Heerenveen, Netherlands	

== Women ==
Event	Record	Athlete	Date	Meet	Place	Ref
500 meters	36.77	Andżelika Wójcik	4 December 2021	World Cup	Salt Lake City, United States	
500 meters × 2	80.50	Andżelika Wójcik	2 February 2017	Universiade	Almaty, Kazakhstan	
1000 meters	1:14.09	Andżelika Wójcik	4 December 2021	World Cup	Salt Lake City, United States	
1500 meters	1:53.56	Natalia Czerwonka	16 February 2020	World Single Distances Championships	Salt Lake City, United States	
3000 meters	4:02.12	Katarzyna Bachleda-Curuś	15 November 2013	World Cup	Salt Lake City, United States	
5000 meters	7:05.50	Magdalena Czyszczoń	16 December 2022	World Cup	Calgary, Canada	
10000 meters	16:27.45	Karolina Gąsecka	11 November 2018	Zawody Kontrolne	Tomaszów Mazowiecki, Poland	
Team sprint (3 laps)	1:25.37	Kaja Ziomek; Andżelika Wójcik; Natalia Czerwonka	13 February 2020	World Single Distances Championships	Salt Lake City, United States	
Team pursuit (6 laps)	2:58.01	Katarzyna Bachleda-Curuś; Natalia Czerwonka; Luiza Złotkowska	17 November 2013	World Cup	Salt Lake City, United States	
Sprint combination	150.560 pts	Kaja Ziomek-Nogal	5–6 March 2026	World Sprint Championships	Heerenveen, Netherlands	
Mini combination	161.499 pts	Zofia Braun	20–22 March 2025	Olympic Oval Finale	Calgary, Canada	
Small combination	164.128 pts	Natalia Czerwonka	4–5 March 2017	World Allround Championships	Hamar, Norway	

== Mixed ==
Event	Record	Athlete	Date	Meet	Place	Ref
Relay	2:56.12	Damian Żurek; Karolina Bosiek	12 November 2023	World Cup	Obihiro, Japan	
