= Speed skating at the 2014 Winter Olympics – Women's team pursuit =

Women's team pursuit at the XXII Olympic Winter Games
- Pictogram of speed skating
- Venue: Adler Arena Skating Center
- Date: 21–22 February 2014
- Competitors: 32 from 8 nations
- Winning time: 2:58.05

Medalists
1st place, gold medalist(s)		Jorien ter Mors; Marrit Leenstra; Ireen Wüst; Lotte van Beek	Netherlands
2nd place, silver medalist(s)		Katarzyna Bachleda-Curuś; Natalia Czerwonka; Luiza Złotkowska; Katarzyna Woźniak	Poland
3rd place, bronze medalist(s)		Olga Graf; Yekaterina Lobysheva; Yuliya Skokova; Yekaterina Shikhova	Russia

The women's team pursuit speed skating competition of the 2014 Sochi Olympics was held at Adler Arena Skating Center on 21 and 22 February 2014. The distance was 2,400 metres.

== Qualification ==
A total of eight teams of three or four speed skaters could qualify for this team event. The top 6 of the 2013–14 ISU Speed Skating World Cup – Women's team pursuit standings after the World Cup race in Berlin secured a spot in the Olympics. Of the teams outside the top six, the United States and Norway qualified based on the time ranking. Russia would still have qualified as hosts if they had failed to make the list, but their sixth place in the World Cup standings secured a spot outright. A reserve list was also made.

== Records ==
Prior to this competition, the existing world and Olympic records were as follows.

World record	Canada; Christine Nesbitt; Kristina Groves; Brittany Schussler	2:55.79	Calgary, Canada	6 December 2009
Olympic record	Canada; Christine Nesbitt; Kristina Groves; Cindy Klassen	3:01.24	Turin, Italy	15 February 2006

At the 2013 World Single Distance Speed Skating Championships the track record was at 3:00.02 by the team of the Netherlands consisting of Marrit Leenstra, Diane Valkenburg, and Ireen Wüst.

The following records were set during this competition.

Date	Round	Athlete	Country	Time	Record
22 February	Final A	Marrit Leenstra; Jorien ter Mors; Ireen Wüst	Netherlands	2:58.05	OR, TR
22 February	Semifinal 2	Marrit Leenstra; Jorien ter Mors; Ireen Wüst	Netherlands	2:58.43	OR, TR
21 February	Quarterfinal 4	Jorien ter Mors; Lotte van Beek; Ireen Wüst	Netherlands	2:58.61	OR, TR

OR = Olympic record, TR = track record

== Results ==
=== Bracket ===
Quarterfinal
1	Netherlands	2:58.61
7	United States	3:02.21
4	Japan	3:03.99
5	South Korea	3:05.28
3	Canada	3:02.06
6	Russia	3:01.53
2	Poland	3:02.12
8	Norway	3:05.13

Semifinal
1	Netherlands	2:58.43
4	Japan	3:10.19
6	Russia	3:02.09
2	Poland	3:00.60

Final
1	Netherlands	2:58.05
2	Poland	3:05.55
Third place
4	Japan	3:02.57
6	Russia	2:59.73

=== Quarterfinals ===
The quarterfinals were held on 21 February.

Rank	Country	Name	Time	Deficit	Notes
Quarterfinal 1
1	Russia	Olga Graf; Yekaterina Lobysheva; Yuliya Skokova	3:01.53		Semifinal 1
2	Canada	Kali Christ; Christine Nesbitt; Brittany Schussler	3:02.06	+0.53	Final C
Quarterfinal 2
1	Poland	Katarzyna Bachleda-Curuś; Natalia Czerwonka; Luiza Złotkowska	3:02.12		Semifinal 1
2	Norway	Hege Bøkko; Mari Hemmer; Ida Njåtun	3:05.13	+3.01	Final D
Quarterfinal 3
1	Japan	Misaki Oshigiri; Maki Tabata; Nana Takagi	3:03.99		Semifinal 2
2	South Korea	Kim Bo-reum; Noh Seon-yeong; Yang Shin-young	3:05.28	+1.29	Final D
Quarterfinal 4
1	Netherlands	Jorien ter Mors; Lotte van Beek; Ireen Wüst	2:58.61		Semifinal 2 OR, TR
2	United States	Brittany Bowe; Heather Richardson; Jilleanne Rookard	3:02.21	+3.60	Final C

OR = Olympic record, TR = track record

=== Semifinals ===
The semifinals were held on 22 February.

Rank	Country	Name	Time	Deficit	Notes
Semifinal 1
1	Poland	Katarzyna Bachleda-Curuś; Natalia Czerwonka; Luiza Złotkowska	3:00.60		Final A
2	Russia	Olga Graf; Yekaterina Shikhova; Yuliya Skokova	3:02.09	+1.49	Final B
Semifinal 2
1	Netherlands	Marrit Leenstra; Jorien ter Mors; Ireen Wüst	2:58.43		Final A OR, TR
2	Japan	Misaki Oshigiri; Ayaka Kikuchi; Nana Takagi	3:10.19	+11.76	Final B

OR = Olympic record, TR = track record

=== Finals ===
The finals were held on 22 February.

Rank	Country	Name	Time	Deficit	Notes
Final A
1st place, gold medalist(s)	Netherlands	Marrit Leenstra; Jorien ter Mors; Ireen Wüst	2:58.05		OR, TR
2nd place, silver medalist(s)	Poland	Katarzyna Bachleda-Curuś; Katarzyna Woźniak; Luiza Złotkowska	3:05.55	+7.50	
Final B
3rd place, bronze medalist(s)	Russia	Olga Graf; Yekaterina Lobysheva; Yuliya Skokova	2:59.73		
4	Japan	Misaki Oshigiri; Maki Tabata; Nana Takagi	3:02.57	+2.84	
Final C
5	Canada	Ivanie Blondin; Kali Christ; Brittany Schussler	3:02.04		
6	United States	Brittany Bowe; Heather Richardson; Jilleanne Rookard	3:03.77	+1.73	
Final D
7	Norway	Hege Bøkko; Camilla Farestveit; Ida Njåtun	3:08.35		
8	South Korea	Kim Bo-reum; Noh Seon-yeong; Yang Shin-young	3:11.54	+3.19	

OR = Olympic record, TR = track record
