= 2013 World Single Distance Speed Skating Championships – Women's team pursuit =

Women's team pursuit at the 2013 World Single Distance Speed Skating Championships
- Venue: Adler Arena, Sochi
- Date: 24 March 2013
- Competitors: 24 from 8 nations
- Teams: 8
- Winning time: 3:00.02

Medalists
gold medal	Marrit Leenstra; Diane Valkenburg; Ireen Wüst	Netherlands
silver medal	Katarzyna Bachleda-Curuś; Natalia Czerwonka; Luiza Złotkowska	Poland
bronze medal	Kim Bo-reum; Noh Seon-yeong; Park Do-yeong	South Korea

The women's team pursuit race of the 2013 World Single Distance Speed Skating Championships was held on 24 March at 18:06 local time.

== Results ==
Rank	Pair	Country	Athletes	Time	Deficit	Notes
1st place, gold medalist(s)	4	Netherlands	Marrit Leenstra; Diane Valkenburg; Ireen Wüst	3:00.02		
2nd place, silver medalist(s)	3	Poland	Katarzyna Bachleda-Curuś; Natalia Czerwonka; Luiza Złotkowska	3:04.91	+4.89	
3rd place, bronze medalist(s)	2	South Korea	Kim Bo-reum; Noh Seon-yeong; Park Do-yeong	3:05.32	+5.30	
4	3	Germany	Monique Angermüller; Bente Kraus; Claudia Pechstein	3:05.50	+5.48	
5	1	Russia	Olga Graf; Yekaterina Lobysheva; Yuliya Skokova	3:05.94	+5.92	
6	1	Norway	Hege Bøkko; Mari Hemmer; Ida Njåtun	3:07.23	+7.21	
7	2	Japan	Masako Hozumi; Eriko Ishino; Miho Takagi	3:07.90	+7.88	
8	4	Canada	Ivanie Blondin; Christine Nesbitt; Brittany Schussler	3:20.92	+20.90	
