= 2015–16 ISU Speed Skating World Cup – Women's team pursuit =

The women's team pursuit in the 2015–16 ISU Speed Skating World Cup will be contested over four races, out of a total of six World Cup occasions for the season, with the first occasion taking place in Calgary, Alberta, Canada, on 13–15 November 2015, and the final occasion taking place in Heerenveen, Netherlands, on 11–13 March 2016.

The defending champion was the Netherlands. This year, Japan won three out of four races and the final classification.

== Top three ==
Position	Country	Points	Previous season

== Race medallists ==
WC #	Location	Date	Gold	Time	Silver	Time	Bronze	Time	Report
1	Calgary, Canada	14 November	Netherlands; Marrit Leenstra; Antoinette de Jong; Marije Joling	2:56.11	Japan; Ayaka Kikuchi; Miho Takagi; Misaki Oshigiri	2:56.46	Russia; Olga Graf; Natalya Voronina; Elizaveta Kazelina	2:56.98	
3	Inzell, Germany	5 December	Japan; Miho Takagi; Nana Takagi; Misaki Oshigiri; Ayaka Kikuchi	2:59.08	Netherlands; Marrit Leenstra; Antoinette de Jong; Marije Joling	2:59.69	Russia; Natalya Voronina; Olga Graf; Elizaveta Kazelina; Margarita Ryzhova	3:00.36	
4	Heerenveen, Netherlands	12 December	Japan; Ayaka Kikuchi; Nana Takagi; Miho Takagi; Misaki Oshigiri	2:59.58	Netherlands; Marrit Leenstra; Antoinette de Jong; Linda de Vries; Irene Schouten	3:01.26	Poland; Natalia Czerwonka; Katarzyna Woźniak; Luiza Złotkowska; Aleksandra Goss	3:01.51	
6	Heerenveen, Netherlands	12 March	Japan; Nana Takagi; Miho Takagi; Misaki Oshigiri	2:58.06	Netherlands; Marrit Leenstra; Antoinette de Jong; Ireen Wüst	2:58.21	Poland; Natalia Czerwonka; Katarzyna Woźniak; Luiza Złotkowska	3:02.34	

Note: the races are over 6 laps.

== Standings ==
#	Country	CGY	INZ	HVN1	HVN2	Total
1	Japan	80	100	100	150	430
2	Netherlands	100	80	80	120	380
3	Russia	70	70	60	90	290
4	Poland	35	60	70	104	269
5	Canada	60	45	50		155
6	Germany	45	50	45		140
7	China	40	35	40		115
8	South Korea	50	40	—		90
9	Czech Republic	30	—	35		65
10	United States	25	—	—		25
