= List of South Korean records in speed skating =

The following are the national records in speed skating in South Korea.

== Men ==
Event	Record	Athlete	Date	Meet	Place	Ref
500 meters	33.78	Kim Jun-ho	16 November 2025	World Cup	Salt Lake City, United States	
500 meters × 2	68.69	Lee Kang-seok	9 March 2007	World Single Distance Championships	Salt Lake City, United States	
1000 meters	1:07.07	Lee Kyou-hyuk	11 November 2007	World Cup	Salt Lake City, United States	
1500 meters	1:42.54	Kim Min-seok	10 March 2019	World Cup	Salt Lake City, United States	
3000 meters	3:39.43	Lee Seung-hoon	12 August 2012	Summer Classic	Calgary, Canada	
5000 meters	6:07.04	Lee Seung-hoon	10 November 2013	World Cup	Calgary, Canada	
10000 meters	12:55.54	Lee Seung-hoon	15 February 2018	Olympic Games	Gangneung, South Korea	
Team sprint (3 laps)	1:18.82	Kim Jun-ho; Cha Min-kyu; Cho Sang-hyeok	26 January 2025	World Cup	Calgary, Canada	
Team pursuit (8 laps)	3:37.51	Joo Hyong-jun; Kim Cheol-min; Lee Seung-hoon	16 November 2013	World Cup	Salt Lake City, United States	
Sprint combination	137.000 pts	Lee Kang-seok	28–29 January 2012	World Sprint Championships	Calgary, Canada	
Small combination	152.432 pts	Ha Hong-seon	12–14 March 2010	World Junior Championships	Moscow, Russia	
Big combination	152.940 pts	Lee Seung-hoon	9–10 January 2010	World Championship Qualification	Obihiro, Japan	

== Women ==
Event	Record	Athlete	Date	Meet	Place	Ref
500 meters	36.36	Lee Sang-hwa	16 November 2013	World Cup	Salt Lake City, United States	
500 meters × 2	74.70	Lee Sang-hwa	11 February 2014	Olympic Games	Sochi, Russia	
1000 meters	1:13.42	Kim Min-sun	28 January 2024	World Cup	Salt Lake City, United States	
1500 meters	1:54.09	Park Ji-woo	15 November 2025	World Cup	Salt Lake City, United States	
3000 meters	4:02.10	Park Ji-woo	14 November 2025	World Cup	Salt Lake City, United States	
5000 meters	7:05.55	Kim Bo-reum	20 November 2015	World Cup	Salt Lake City, United States	
10000 meters						
Team sprint (3 laps)	1:27.45	Kim Min-sun; Kim Hyun-Yung; Jang Mi	22 November 2015	World Cup	Salt Lake City, United States	
Team pursuit (6 laps)	2:58.32	Kim Bo-reum; Noh Seon-yeong; Park Do-yeong	17 November 2013	World Cup	Salt Lake City, United States	
Sprint combination	148.560 pts	Lee Sang-hwa	26–27 January 2013	World Sprint Championships	Salt Lake City, United States	
Mini combination	162.759 pts	Kim Yoo-rim	10–12 March 2006	World Junior Championships	Erfurt, Germany	
Small combination	165.668 pts	Baek Eun-bi	26–28 November 1999	Can-Am International	Calgary, Canada	

== Mixed ==
Event	Record	Athlete	Date	Meet	Place	Ref
Relay	2:56.20	Yang Ho-jun; Lee Na-hyun	28 January 2024	World Cup	Salt Lake City, United States	
