= 2014–15 ISU Speed Skating World Cup – World Cup 3 – Women's team pursuit =

The women's team pursuit race of the 2014–15 ISU Speed Skating World Cup 3, arranged in Sportforum Hohenschönhausen, in Berlin, Germany, was held on 6 December 2014.

The Dutch team won the race, while the Polish team came second, and the Japanese team came third.

== Results ==
The race took place on Saturday, 6 December, in the afternoon session, scheduled at 18:21.

Rank	Country	Skaters	Pair	Lane	Time	WC points
1st place, gold medalist(s)	Netherlands	Ireen Wüst; Marrit Leenstra; Marije Joling	4	i	2:59.72	100
2nd place, silver medalist(s)	Poland	Luiza Złotkowska; Katarzyna Woźniak; Aleksandra Goss	2	i	3:03:83	80
3rd place, bronze medalist(s)	Japan	Nana Takagi; Maki Tabata; Ayaka Kikuchi	4	o	3:04:00	70
4	Canada	Kali Christ; Ivanie Blondin; Josie Spence	3	o	3:04.71	60
5	Germany	Claudia Pechstein; Bente Kraus; Isabell Ost	3	i	3:05.02	50
6	Russia	Olga Graf; Yuliya Skokova; Margarita Ryzhova	2	o	3:07.03	45
7	South Korea	Kim Bo-reum; Noh Seon-yeong; Jun Ye-jin	1	o	3:08.49	40
8	China	Zhao Xin; Liu Jing; Liu Yichi	1	i	3:10.52	35
