= 2014–15 ISU Speed Skating World Cup – Women's team pursuit =

The women's team pursuit in the 2014–15 ISU Speed Skating World Cup was contested over three races on three occasions, out of a total of seven World Cup occasions for the season, with the first occasion taking place in Obihiro, Japan, on 14–16 November 2014, and the last occasion taking place in Heerenveen, Netherlands, on 12–14 December 2014.

The defending champions were the Netherlands.

The Dutch team retained the cup by winning all races.

== Top three ==
Position	Country	Points	Previous season
1	Netherlands	350	1st
2	Germany	240	10th
3	Poland	236	2nd

== Race medallists ==
WC #	Location	Date	Gold	Time	Silver	Time	Bronze	Time	Report
1	Obihiro, Japan	15 November	Netherlands; Ireen Wüst; Marrit Leenstra; Marije Joling	3:02.54	Japan; Nana Takagi; Ayaka Kikuchi; Maki Tabata	3:04.78	Germany; Claudia Pechstein; Bente Kraus; Gabriele Hirschbichler	3:06.51	
3	Berlin, Germany	6 December	Netherlands; Ireen Wüst; Marrit Leenstra; Marije Joling	2:59.72	Poland; Luiza Złotkowska; Katarzyna Woźniak; Aleksandra Goss	3:03.83	Japan; Nana Takagi; Maki Tabata; Ayaka Kikuchi	3:04.00	
4	Heerenveen, Netherlands	13 December	Netherlands; Carlijn Achtereekte; Linda de Vries; Marrit Leenstra	2:59.69	Germany; Bente Kraus; Claudia Pechstein; Isabell Ost	3:01.96	Poland; Aleksandra Goss; Katarzyna Woźniak; Luiza Złotkowska	3:02.31	

== Standings ==
Standings as of 13 December 2014 (end of the season).

#	Country	OBI	BER	HVN	Total
1	Netherlands	100	100	150	350
2	Germany	70	50	120	240
3	Poland	50	80	106	236
4	Japan	80	70	76	226
5	Russia	45	45	90	180
6	Canada	60	60	40	160
7	South Korea	30	40	45	115
8	China	40	35	36	111
9	Czech Republic	35			35
