= 2014–15 ISU Speed Skating World Cup – World Cup 4 – Women's team pursuit =

The women's team pursuit race of the 2014–15 ISU Speed Skating World Cup 4, arranged in the Thialf arena in Heerenveen, Netherlands, was held on 13 December 2014.

The Dutch team won the race, while the German team came second, and the Polish team came third.

== Results ==
The race took place on Saturday, 13 December, in the afternoon session, scheduled at 16:33.

Rank	Country	Skaters	Pair	Lane	Time	WC points
1st place, gold medalist(s)	Netherlands	Carlijn Achtereekte; Linda de Vries; Marrit Leenstra	4	i	2:59.69	150
2nd place, silver medalist(s)	Germany	Bente Kraus; Claudia Pechstein; Isabell Ost	3	o	3:01.96	120
3rd place, bronze medalist(s)	Poland	Aleksandra Goss; Katarzyna Woźniak; Luiza Złotkowska	3	i	3:02.31	106
4	Russia	Olga Graf; Margarita Ryzhova; Natalya Voronina	2	o	3:03.46	90
5	Japan	Ayaka Kikuchi; Maki Tabata; Nana Takagi	4	o	3:03.61	76
6	South Korea	Jun Ye-jin; Kim Bo-reum; Noh Seon-yeong	1	o	3:08.33	45
7	Canada	Kate Hanly; Lauren McGuire; Josie Spence	2	i	3:09.16	40
8	China	Liu Jing; Liu Yichi; Zhao Xin	1	i	3:10.39	36
