= 2016 World Single Distances Speed Skating Championships – Women's mass start =

Women's mass start at the 2016 World Single Distances Speed Skating Championships
- Venue: Kolomna Speed Skating Center, Kolomna
- Date: 14 February 2016
- Competitors: 24 from 16 nations
- Winning time: 8:17.53

Medalists
gold medal	Ivanie Blondin	Canada
silver medal	Kim Bo-reum	South Korea
bronze medal	Miho Takagi	Japan

The women's mass start race of the 2016 World Single Distances Speed Skating Championships was held on 14 February 2016.

== Results ==
The race was started at 17:35.

Rank	Name	Country	Time	Points
1st place, gold medalist(s)	Ivanie Blondin	CAN	8:17.53	62
2nd place, silver medalist(s)	Kim Bo-reum	KOR	8:17.66	40
3rd place, bronze medalist(s)	Miho Takagi	JPN	8:17.68	20
4	Francesca Lollobrigida	ITA	8:18.92	5
5	Jelena Peeters	BEL	8:22.29	5
6	Liu Jing	CHN	8:25.02	5
7	Janneke Ensing	NED	8:24.37	4
8	Vanessa Bittner	AUT	8:30.92	3
9	Yevgeniya Lalenkova	RUS	8:40.38	3
10	Irene Schouten	NED	8:17.69	0
11	Misaki Oshigiri	JPN	8:17.78	0
12	Park Do-yeong	KOR	8:18.56	0
13	Heather Richardson-Bergsma	USA	8:19.75	0
14	Marina Zueva	BLR	8:20.61	0
15	Claudia Pechstein	GER	8:20.92	0
16	Bente Kraus	GER	8:21.65	0
17	Paige Schwartzburg	USA	8:22.45	0
18	Nikola Zdráhalová	CZE	8:40.10	0
19	Aleksandra Goss	POL	8:49.50	0
20	Tatyana Mikhailova	BLR	8:49.86	0
21	Saskia Alusalu	EST	7:42.21	0
22	Hao Jiachen	CHN	4:45.76	0
23	Heather McLean	CAN	3:19.90	0
24	Luiza Złotkowska	POL	3:31.86	0
