= 2017 World Single Distances Speed Skating Championships – Women's mass start =

Women's speed skating

Women's mass start at the 2017 World Single Distances Speed Skating Championships
- Venue: Gangneung Oval
- Location: Gangneung, South Korea
- Dates: 12 February
- Competitors: 24 from 15 nations
- Winning points: 60

Medalists
gold medal	Kim Bo-reum	South Korea
silver medal	Nana Takagi	Japan
bronze medal	Heather Bergsma	United States

The Women's mass start competition at the 2017 World Single Distances Speed Skating Championships was held on 12 February 2017.

== Results ==
The race was started at 20:14.

Rank	Name	Country	Time	Points
1st place, gold medalist(s)	Kim Bo-reum	South Korea	8:00.79	60
2nd place, silver medalist(s)	Nana Takagi	Japan	8:00.90	40
3rd place, bronze medalist(s)	Heather Bergsma	United States	8:01.36	20
4	Francesca Lollobrigida	Italy	8:01.62	5
5	Guo Dan	China	8:04.04	5
6	Marina Zueva	Belarus	8:08.07	5
7	Luiza Złotkowska	Poland	8:04.03	3
8	Elena Møller Rigas	Denmark	8:12.38	3
9	Vanessa Herzog	Austria	8:22.57	3
10	Ivanie Blondin	Canada	8:02.06	1
11	Claudia Pechstein	Germany	8:04.80	1
12	Li Dan	China	8:19.18	1
13	Mia Manganello	United States	8:02.14	0
14	Park Ji-woo	South Korea	8:04.37	0
15	Nikola Zdráhalová	Czech Republic	8:05.16	0
16	Bente Kraus	Germany	8:06.28	0
17	Carien Kleibeuker	Netherlands	8:09.31	0
18	Jelena Peeters	Belgium	8:16.36	0
19	Magdalena Czyszczoń	Poland	8:20.19	0
20	Tatsiana Mikhailava	Belarus	8:29.53	0
21	Miho Takagi	Japan	8:32.28	0
22	Irene Schouten	Netherlands	8:41.76	0
23	Sofie Karoline Haugen	Norway	8:03.09	0
24	Eliška Dřímalová	Czech Republic	8:03.19	0
