= 2012 World Single Distance Speed Skating Championships =

World Single Distance Speed Skating Championships
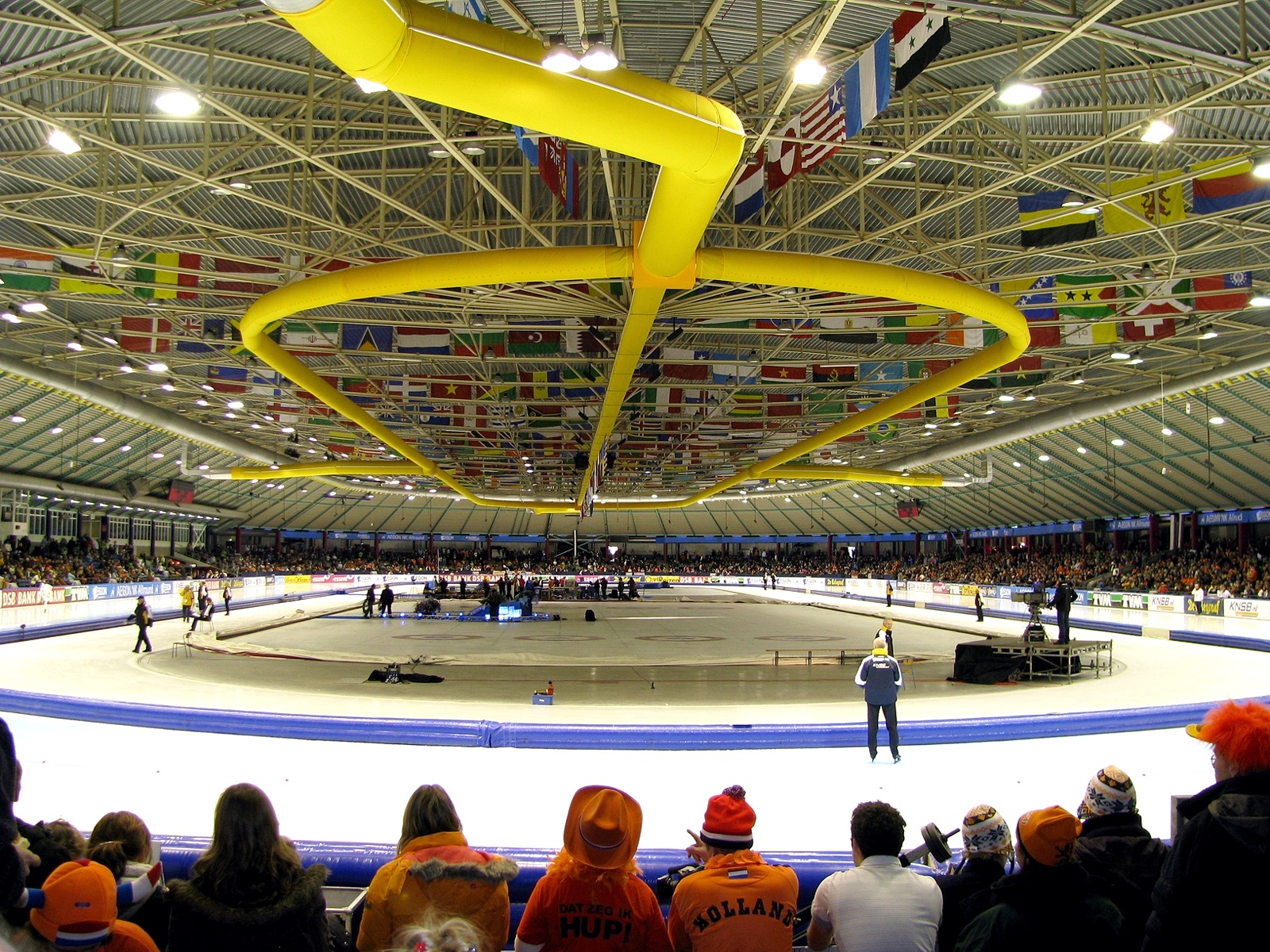
- Thialf (Heerenveen)
- Venue: Thialf (Heerenveen)
- Dates: 22–25 March 2012

The 2012 World Single Distance Speed Skating Championships took place between 22 and 25 March 2012 in the Thialf, Heerenveen, Netherlands.

Queen Beatrix of the Netherlands visited the Championships on 24 March.

== Schedule ==
| Date | Time | Events |
|---|---|---|
| March 22 | 16:30 | 1500 m men |
| March 22 | | 3000 m women |
| March 23 | 15:00 | 1000 m men |
| March 23 | | 1500 m women |
| March 23 | | 5000 m men |
| March 24 | 12:00 | 1000 m women |
| March 24 | | 10000 m men |
| March 24 | | 5000 m women |
| March 25 | 13:30 | 500 m women |
| March 25 | | 500 m men |
| March 25 | | Team pursuit women |
| March 25 | | Team pursuit men |

Source: schaatsen.nl& ISU.org

== Medal summary ==
=== Men's events ===
| Event | Gold | | Silver | | Bronze | |
|---|---|---|---|---|---|---|
| 500 m | Mo Tae-bum; South Korea | 69.64 | Michel Mulder; Netherlands | +0.01 | Pekka Koskela; Finland | +0.18 |
| 1000 m | Stefan Groothuis; Netherlands | 1:08.57 | Kjeld Nuis; Netherlands | +0.22 | Shani Davis; United States | +0.26 |
| 1500 m | Denny Morrison; Canada | 1:46.44 | Ivan Skobrev; Russia | +0.05 | Håvard Bøkko; Norway | +0.06 |
| 5000 m | Sven Kramer; Netherlands | 6:13.87 | Bob de Jong; Netherlands | +1.39 | Jonathan Kuck; United States | +2.41 |
| 10000 m | Bob de Jong; Netherlands | 12:53.91 | Jorrit Bergsma; Netherlands | +3.80 | Jonathan Kuck; United States | +18.75 |
| Team pursuit | Netherlands; Sven Kramer; Koen Verweij; Jan Blokhuijsen | 3:41.43 | United States; Shani Davis; Brian Hansen; Jonathan Kuck | +1.99 | Russia; Ivan Skobrev; Denis Yuskov; Yevgeny Lalenkov | +2.19 |

Source: ISU

=== Women's events ===
| Event | Gold | | Silver | | Bronze | |
|---|---|---|---|---|---|---|
| 500 m | Lee Sang-hwa; South Korea | 75.69 | Yu Jing; China | +0.43 | Thijsje Oenema; Netherlands | +0.59 |
| 1000 m | Christine Nesbitt; Canada | 1:15.16 | Yu Jing; China | +0.82 | Margot Boer; Netherlands | +1.00 |
| 1500 m | Christine Nesbitt; Canada | 1:56.07 | Ireen Wüst; Netherlands | +0.33 | Linda de Vries; Netherlands | +1.01 |
| 3000 m | Martina Sáblíková; Czech Republic | 4:01.88 | Stephanie Beckert; Germany | +2.21 | Ireen Wüst; Netherlands | +2.99 |
| 5000 m | Martina Sáblíková; Czech Republic | 6:50.46 | Stephanie Beckert; Germany | +6.18 | Claudia Pechstein; Germany | +13.55 |
| Team pursuit | Netherlands; Ireen Wüst; Diane Valkenburg; Linda de Vries | 2:59.70 | Canada; Brittany Schussler; Christine Nesbitt; Cindy Klassen | +0.81 | Poland; Natalia Czerwonka; Katarzyna Woźniak; Luiza Złotkowska | +3.62 |

Source: ISU

== Medal table ==
| Rank | Nation | Gold | Silver | Bronze | Total |
|---|---|---|---|---|---|
| 1 | Netherlands (NED) | 5 | 5 | 4 | 14 |
| 2 | Canada (CAN) | 3 | 1 | 0 | 4 |
| 3 | Czech Republic (CZE) | 2 | 0 | 0 | 2 |
| 3 | South Korea (KOR) | 2 | 0 | 0 | 2 |
| 5 | Germany (GER) | 0 | 2 | 1 | 3 |
| 6 | China (CHN) | 0 | 2 | 0 | 2 |
| 7 | United States (USA) | 0 | 1 | 3 | 4 |
| 8 | Russia (RUS) | 0 | 1 | 1 | 2 |
| 9 | Finland (FIN) | 0 | 0 | 1 | 1 |
| 9 | Norway (NOR) | 0 | 0 | 1 | 1 |
| 9 | Poland (POL) | 0 | 0 | 1 | 1 |
| Totals (11 entries) | | 12 | 12 | 12 | 36 |
