= 2013 World Single Distance Speed Skating Championships =

World Single Distance Speed Skating Championships
- Venue: Adler Arena (Sochi)
- Dates: 21–24 March 2013

The 2013 World Single Distance Speed Skating Championships took place between 21 and 24 March 2013 in the Adler Arena, Sochi, Russia. It was a test event for the 2014 Olympic Games.

== Schedule ==
Date	Time	Events
21 March	16:35	1500 m men
21 March	17:30	3000 m women
22 March	15:00	1000 m men
22 March	15:51	1500 m women
22 March	16:53	5000 m men
23 March	13:30	1000 m women
23 March	14:25	10000 m men
23 March	17:35	5000 m women
24 March	15:00	500 m women
24 March		500 m men
24 March	18:06	Team pursuit women
24 March		Team pursuit men

Source: schaatsen.nl& ISU.org

== Medal summary ==
=== Men's events ===
Event	Gold		Silver		Bronze	
500 m	Mo Tae-bum; South Korea	69.760 TR	Joji Kato; Japan	+0.06	Jan Smeekens; Netherlands	+0.10
1000 m	Denis Kuzin; Kazakhstan	1:09.14 TR	Mo Tae-bum; South Korea	+0.10	Shani Davis; United States	+0.16
1500 m	Denis Yuskov; Russia	1:46.32 TR	Shani Davis; United States	+0.51	Ivan Skobrev; Russia	+0.65
5000 m	Sven Kramer; Netherlands	6:14.41 TR	Jorrit Bergsma; Netherlands	+3.53	Ivan Skobrev; Russia	+3.90
10000 m	Jorrit Bergsma; Netherlands	12:57.69 TR	Sven Kramer; Netherlands	+2.02	Bob de Jong; Netherlands	+2.57
Team pursuit	Netherlands; Jan Blokhuijsen; Sven Kramer; Koen Verweij	3:42.03 TR	South Korea; Joo Hyong-jun; Kim Cheol-min; Lee Seung-hoon	+2.57	Poland; Zbigniew Bródka; Konrad Niedźwiedzki; Jan Szymański	+3.19

Source: ISU

=== Women's events ===
Event	Gold		Silver		Bronze	
500 m	Lee Sang-hwa; South Korea	75.347 TR	Wang Beixing; China	+0.70	Olga Fatkulina; Russia	+0.75
1000 m	Olga Fatkulina; Russia	1:15.44 TR	Ireen Wüst; Netherlands	+0.27	Brittany Bowe; United States	+0.43
1500 m	Ireen Wüst; Netherlands	1:55.38 TR	Lotte van Beek; Netherlands	+2.64	Christine Nesbitt; Canada	+2.69
3000 m	Ireen Wüst; Netherlands	4:02.43 TR	Martina Sáblíková; Czech Republic	+2.37	Claudia Pechstein; Germany	+5.32
5000 m	Martina Sáblíková; Czech Republic	6:54.31 TR	Ireen Wüst; Netherlands	+8.65	Claudia Pechstein; Germany	+9.76
Team pursuit	Netherlands; Marrit Leenstra; Diane Valkenburg; Ireen Wüst	3:00.02 TR	Poland; Katarzyna Bachleda-Curuś; Natalia Czerwonka; Luiza Złotkowska	+4.89	South Korea; Kim Bo-reum; Noh Seon-yeong; Park Do-yeong	+5.30

Source: ISU

== Medal table ==
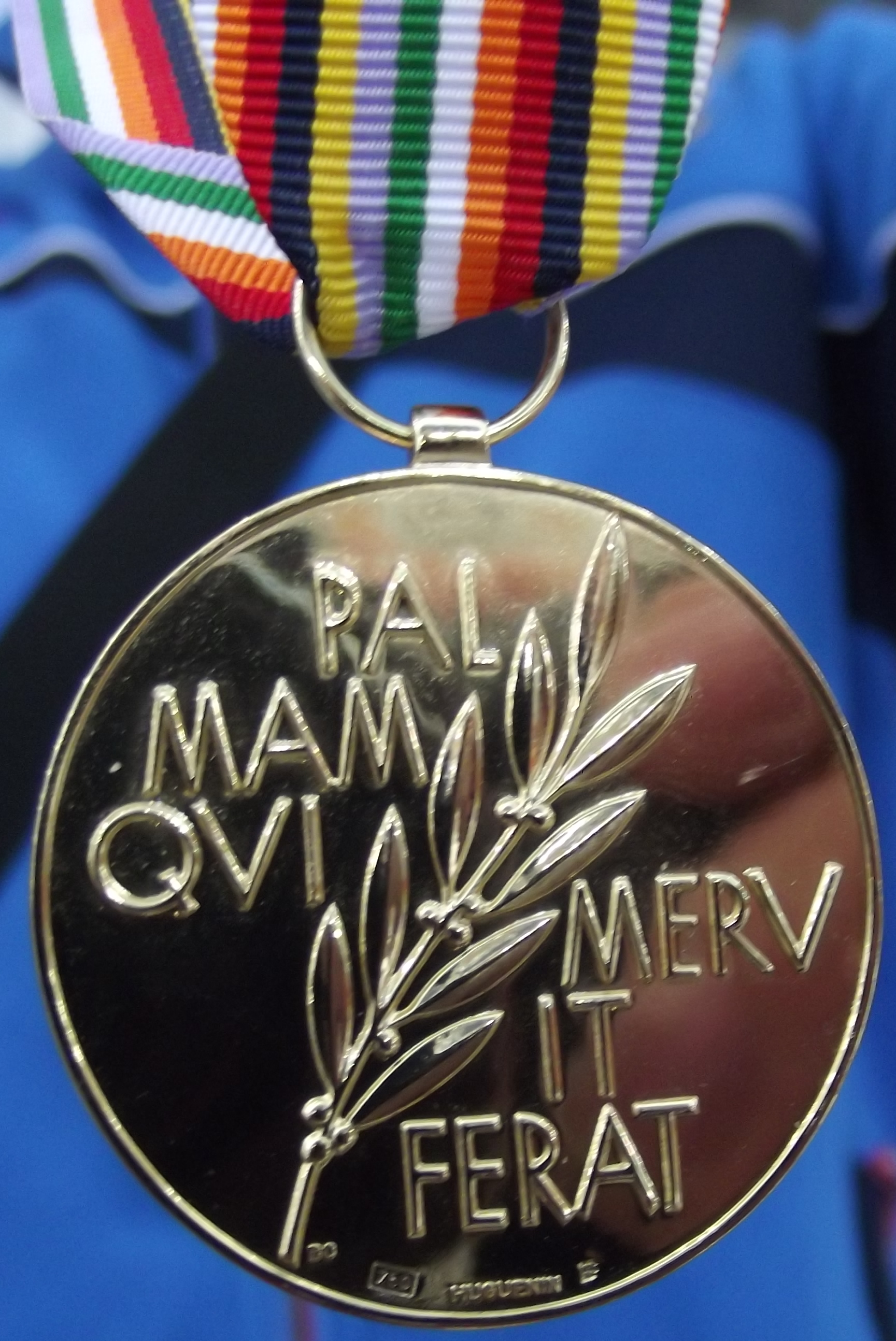
The gold medal

Rank	Nation	Gold	Silver	Bronze	Total
1	Netherlands (NED)	6	5	2	13
2	South Korea (KOR)	2	2	1	5
3	Russia (RUS)	2	0	3	5
4	Czech Republic (CZE)	1	1	0	2
5	Kazakhstan (KAZ)	1	0	0	1
6	United States (USA)	0	1	2	3
7	Poland (POL)	0	1	1	2
8	China (CHN)	0	1	0	1
8	Japan (JPN)	0	1	0	1
10	Germany (GER)	0	0	2	2
11	Canada (CAN)	0	0	1	1
Totals (11 entries)		12	12	12	36
