= Mari Hemmer =

Norwegian speed skater

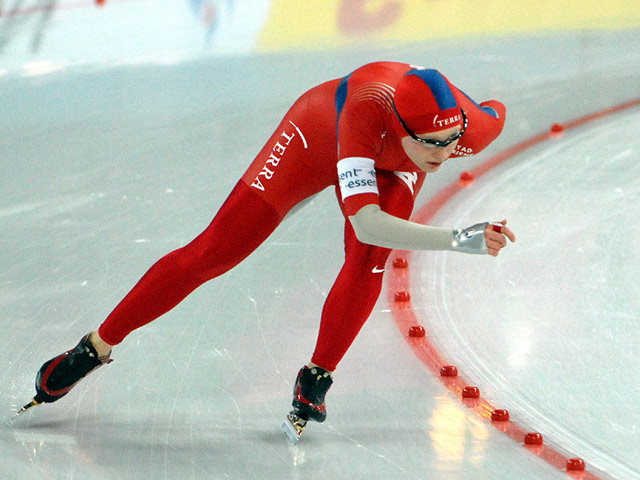
- Hemmer at the 2008 World Cup

Personal information
- Born: 20 November 1983 (age 42) Oslo
- Height: 1.67 m (5 ft 6 in) (2014)

Sport
- Country: Norway
- Sport: Speed skating
- Updated on 6 February 2014

Mari Hemmer (Norwegian: [ˈmɑ̂ːrɪ ˈhɛ̀mːər]; born 20 November 1983) is a Norwegian long-track speed skater, with particular strength in the longer distances 3000 m and 5000 m. She is the Norwegian Allround Champion for 2005, 2007, 2008, 2010, the Norwegian Sprint Champion for 2005, 2009, 2010, and has also won numerous gold, silver, and bronze medals from national championships at single distances. Along with fellow skaters Maren Haugli and Hege Bøkko, Hemmer has in recent years represented Norway at the European Championships, the World Allround Championships and the World Single Distance Championships, as well as in the World Cup. Hemmer is the holder of the current Norwegian record on 10000 m.

== Speed skating ==
In March 2009, Hemmer broke her own national record in the 10000 m, improving the time from 14:50.52 to 14:47.49. The feat was carried out just hours after having skated the 5000 m in 7:13.50, making her one of the few skaters ever who have run both the 5000 m and 10000 m on the same day. The time is still the current Norwegian record.

As of April 2011, Hemmer is the 3rd best ever Norwegian female skater, as per the Adelskalender, after Maren Haugli and Ida Njåtun. Her rank on the international Adelskalender, as of after the 2010–11 season, is 46.

=== Personal records ===
Personal records
Women's speed skating
Event	Result	Date	Location	Notes
500 m	40.51	12 February 2011	Olympic Oval, Calgary	
1000 m	1:19.56	22 March 2009	Olympic Oval, Calgary	
1500 m	1:57.52	19 February 2011	Utah Olympic Oval, Salt Lake City	
3000 m	4:05.98	15 November 2013	Utah Olympic Oval, Salt Lake City	
5000 m	7:01.02	18 February 2011	Utah Olympic Oval, Salt Lake City	
10000 m	14:47.49	20 March 2009	Olympic Oval, Calgary	Current Norwegian record

=== Career highlights ===
World Allround Championships
2008 – Berlin, 18th
European Allround Championships
2007 – Collalbo, 18th
2008 – Kolomna, 16th
World Junior Allround Championships
1999 – Geithus, 38th
2001 – Groningen, 25th
2002 – Collalbo, 31st
2003 – Kushiro, 19th
National Championships
2003 – Geithus, (silver) 2nd at 3000 m
2003 – Geithus, (gold) 1st at 5000 m
2004 – Geithus, (bronze) 3rd at 3000 m
2004 – Geithus, (bronze) 3rd at 1500 m
2004 – Geithus, (silver) 2nd at 5000 m
2004 – Asker, (silver) 2nd at sprint
2005 – Larvik, (gold) 1st at 5000 m
2005 – Drammen, (gold) 1st at allround
2005 – Trondheim, (gold) 1st at sprint
2006 – Hamar, (bronze) 3rd at 1500 m
2006 – Hamar, (bronze) 3rd at 3000 m
2007 – Hamar, (silver) 2nd at 3000 m
2007 – Geithus, (gold) 1st at allround
2008 – Bjugn, (gold) 1st at allround
2009 – Hamar, (bronze) 3rd at 500 m
2009 – Hamar, (silver) 2nd at 1500 m
2009 – Hamar, (silver) 2nd at 3000 m
2009 – Gol, (gold) 1st at 5000 m
2009 – Gol, (silver) 2nd at allround
2009 – Valle Hovin, (gold) 1st at sprint
2010 – Hamar, (bronze) 3rd at 1500 m
2010 – Hamar, (gold) 1st at 3000 m
2010 – Hamar, (gold) 1st at 5000 m
2010 – Hamar, (gold) 1st at sprint
2010 – Bergen, (gold) 1st at allround
2011 – Hamar, (bronze) 3rd at 1500 m
2011 – Hamar, (silver) 2nd at 3000 m
2011 – Frogner Stadion, (gold) 1st at 5000 m
2011 – Frogner Stadion, (silver) 2nd at allround
2012 – Stavanger, (bronze) 3rd at 1500 m
2012 – Stavanger, (bronze) 3rd at 3000 m
2012 – Stavanger, (gold) 1st at 5000 m
Nordic Junior Games
2000 – Chemnitz, (silver) 2nd at 3000 m
2002 – Deventer, (bronze) 3rd at 3000 m
2002 – Deventer, (silver) 2nd at 1500 m
European Youth-23 Games
2004 – Gothenburg, (bronze) 3rd at 5000 m
2005 – Helsinki, (silver) 2nd at 5000 m
