= Yekaterina Lobysheva =

Russian speed skater

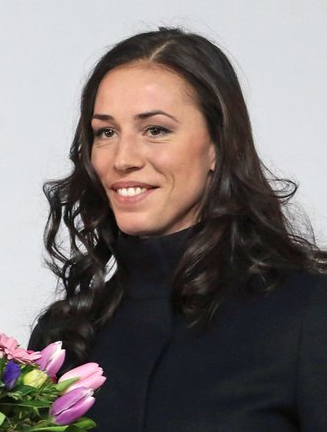
- Lobysheva in 2014

Personal information
- Born: 13 March 1985 (age 41) Kolomna, Soviet Union
- Height: 1.78 m (5 ft 10 in)
- Weight: 69 kg (152 lb)

Sport
- Country: Russia
- Sport: Speed skating
- Club: CSKA Moscow
- Coached by: Vladimir Rubin; Maurizio Marchetto

Achievements and titles
- Personal best(s): 500 m – 38.56 (2009); 1000 m – 1:15.10 (2009); 1500 m – 1:54.87 (2011); 3000 m – 4:08.12 (2011); 5000 m – 7:27.02 (2010)
Medal record
Representing Russia
Olympic Games
Bronze medal – third place	2006 Turin	Team pursuit
Bronze medal – third place	2014 Sochi	Team pursuit

Yekaterina Alexandrovna Lobysheva (Russian: Екатерина Александровна Лобышева; born 13 March 1985) is a retired Russian speed skater. She won bronze medals in the team pursuit at the 2006 and 2014 Winter Olympics.

== Career ==
In the season of 2005–06 Lobysheva acted for the first time in the European Championships Allround. After good results on the short distances (1st in 500 m, 4th in 1500 m) she finished sixth in the rankings. Thus she placed herself for the World Allround Speed Skating Championships in 2006 where she, despite her good 500 m (second) did not qualify for the final 4th distance. She was the thirteenth in the ranking.

In the same year she won three matches at the 1500 World Cup in the B group. She placed herself for the 1000 and 1500 meters at the Olympic Winter Games in Turin. She became the eleventh and sixth respectively.

At the European Championships Allround 2007 Lobysheva, thanks to third place in the 500 m, was thirteenth in the final rankings. She was with this class its second World Cup Championship Allround skating together in 2006 and ended on the thirteenth place in the rankings.

At the European Championships Allround 2008 she ended (in her hometown Kolomna) in tenth place. In the 500 m, she was in first place as in the year 2006. She ensured that these rankings show places for the World Allround Championship and finished this time in the fourteenth place in the rankings.

In the season of 2008–09 she skated in no European Allround Championship nor in the World Allround Championship, since this season she decided to work more on her sprint qualities (500 m, 1000 m and 1500 m) for next year's Olympics in Vancouver. Her trainer was Sergey Klevchenya.

In 2009 the World Sprint Championship was in her home country, Russia (Moscow). This was her second World Sprint Championship and she ended as 19th in the rankings.

At the 2014 Winter Olympics she was a member of the bronze medal winning Russian pursuit team.
