= Yuliya Skokova =

Russian speed skater (born 1982)

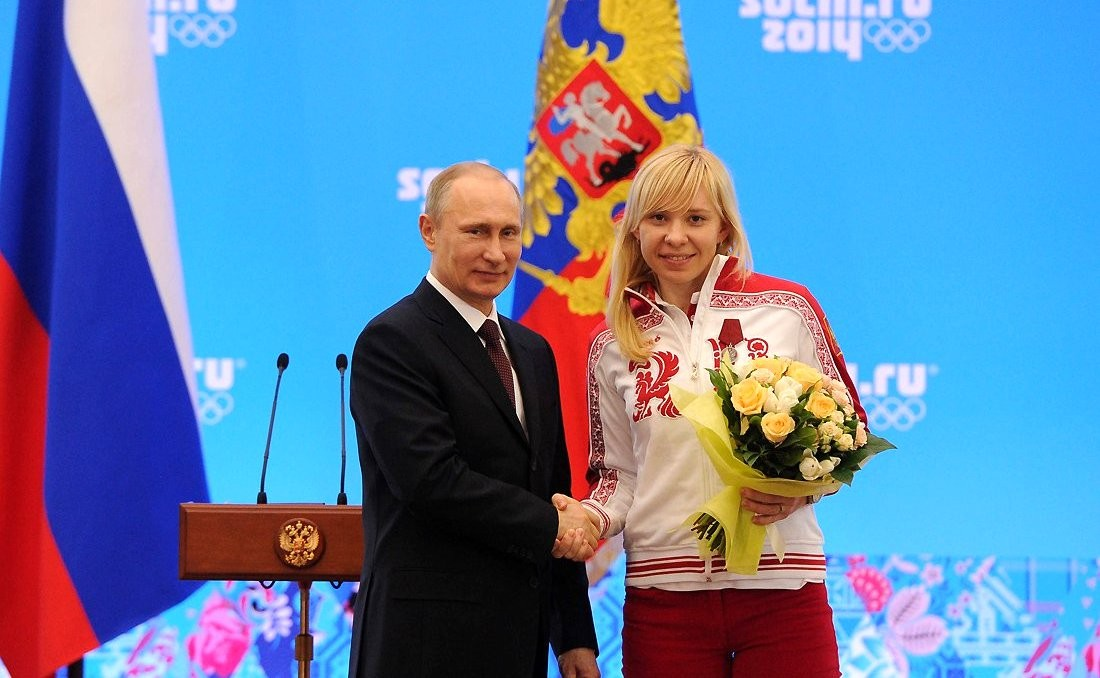

Personal information
- Born: 1 December 1982 (age 43) Omsk, Soviet Union
- Height: 1.75 m (5 ft 9 in)
- Weight: 71 kg (157 lb)

Sport
- Country: Russia
- Sport: Speed skating
Medal record
Representing Russia
Olympic Games
Bronze medal – third place	2014 Sochi	Team pursuit
World Championships
Bronze medal – third place	2015 Heerenveen	Team pursuit

Yuliya Igorevna Skokova (Russian: Юлия Игоревна Скокова) (born 1 December 1982) is a Russian speed skater. She lives in Yekaterinburg. She competed at the 2014 Winter Olympics in Sochi, where she placed eighth in 3000 meters.

== Personal records ==
Personal records
Women's speed skating
Event	Result	Date	Location	Notes
500 m	39.00	22 March 2014	Thialf, Heerenveen	
1000 m	1:15.33	17 November 2013	Utah Olympic Oval, Salt Lake City	
1500 m	1:53.87	16 November 2013	Utah Olympic Oval, Salt Lake City	
3000 m	4:07.00	15 November 2013	Utah Olympic Oval, Salt Lake City	
5000 m	7:18:50	23 March 2014	Thialf, Heerenveen	
