= Jilleanne Rookard =

American speed skater

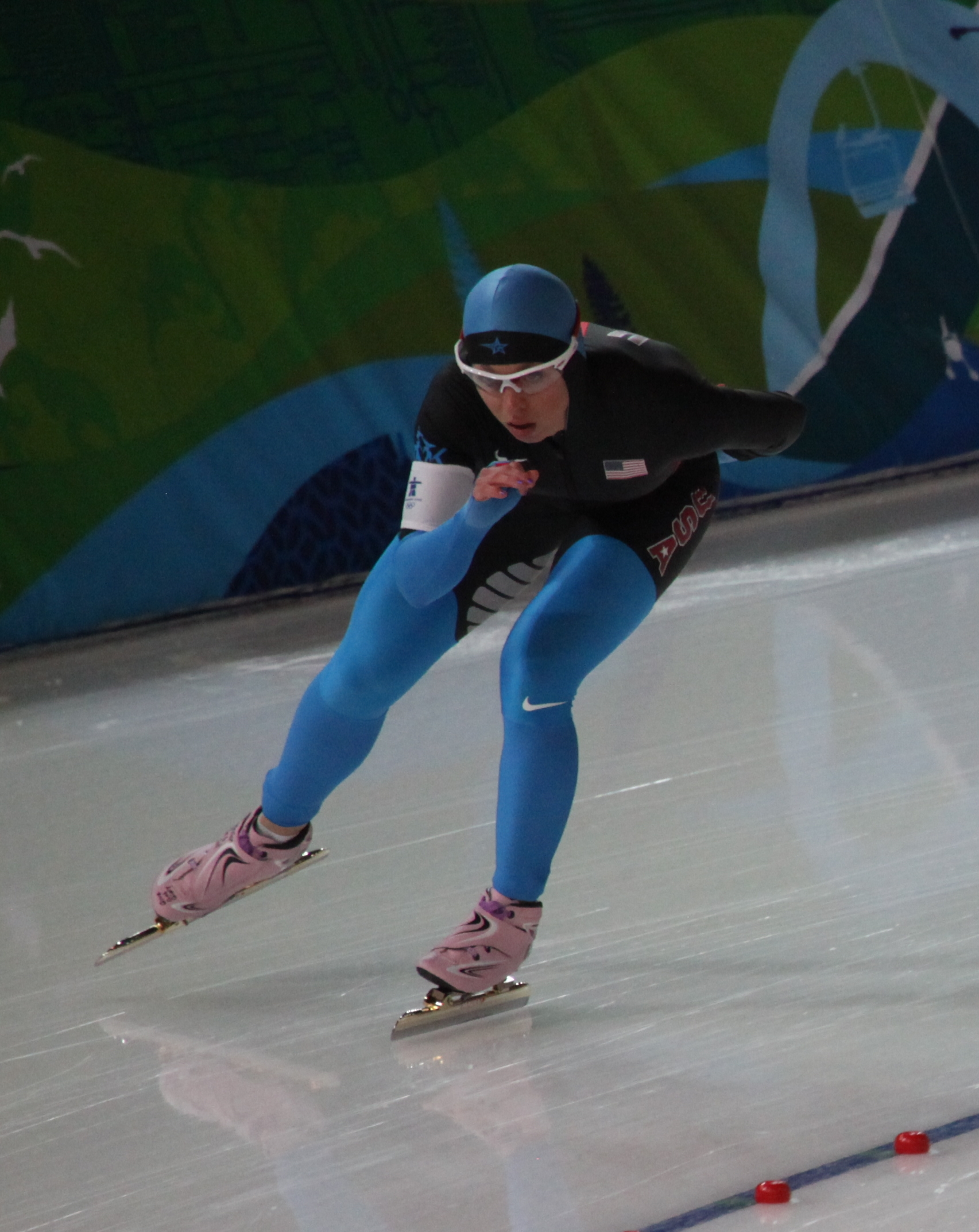
Jilleanne Rookard at the 2010 Winter Olympics.

Jilleanne Rookard (born January 9, 1983, in Wyandotte, Michigan) is a former speed skater who has competed since 2006. She was named to the U.S. team for the 2010 Winter Olympics. She reached the 12th place in the 3000m in a time of 4:13.05 and 8th place in the 5000m with a time of 7:07.48. She now plays Roller Derby with Detroit Roller Derby.

== Olympic Trials ==
On December 27, 2013, Rookard won the 3,000-meter women's speedskating event at the Olympic Trials in Salt Lake City, Utah to earn a spot on the U.S. Olympic team competing in Sochi in February.
