= Park Do-yeong =

South Korean speed skater

Personal information
- Born: 30 January 1993 (age 33) South Korea
- Height: 1.62 m (5 ft 4 in)
- Weight: 47 kg (104 lb; 7.4 st)

Sport
- Country: South Korea
- Sport: Speed skating
Medal record
Representing South Korea
Women's speed skating
World Single Distance Championships
| Bronze medal – third place | 2013 Sochi | Team pursuit |
Asian Games
| Gold medal – first place | 2011 Astana-Almaty | Team pursuit |
| Silver medal – second place | 2011 Astana-Almaty | 5000 m |
World University Games
| Gold medal – first place | 2013 Trentino | Team pursuit |
| Bronze medal – third place | 2013 Trentino | 3000 m |
| Bronze medal – third place | 2013 Trentino | 5000 m |
Women's track cycling
Asian Games
| Bronze medal – third place | 2026 Aichi–Nagoya | Team pursuit |

Park Do-yeong (Korean: 박도영, born 30 January 1993) is a South Korean speed skater. She represented her country at the 2010 Winter Olympics in Vancouver, where she finished 27th in the 3000 m event.

== Personal records ==
Personal records
Women's speed skating
| Event | Result | Date | Location | Notes |
| 500 m | 41.23 | 12 March 2010 | Krylatskoye Skating Hall, Moscow | |
| 1000 m | 1:20.28 | 28 September 2012 | Olympic Oval, Calgary | |
| 1500 m | 1:59.07 | 12 December 2009 | Utah Olympic Oval, Salt Lake City | |
| 3000 m | 4.08.48 | 3 March 2012 | Meiji Hokkaido-Tokachi Oval, Obihiro | |
| 5000 m | 7:08.92 | 8 January 2012 | Alau Ice Palace, Astana | |
