= Katarzyna Woźniak =

Polish speed skater

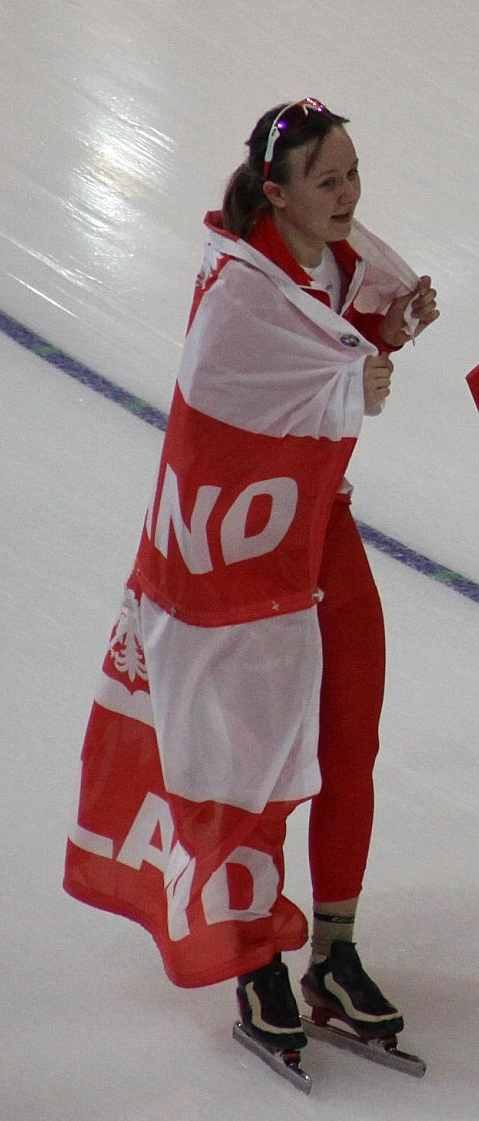

Personal information
- Born: 5 October 1989 (age 36) Warsaw, Poland
- Height: 1.74 m (5 ft 9 in)
- Weight: 60 kg (132 lb)
- Life partner: Konrad Niedźwiedzki

Sport
- Country: Poland
- Sport: speed skating
- Club: WTŁ Stegny Warszawa
- Coached by: Krzysztof Niedźwiedzki
Medal record
Representing Poland
| Event | 1st | 2nd | 3rd |
|---|---|---|---|
| Olympic Games | 0 | 1 | 1 |
| World Championships | 0 | 0 | 1 |
| Universiade | 0 | 0 | 0 |
| Total | 0 | 1 | 2 |
Olympic Games
| Silver medal – second place | 2014 Sochi | Team pursuit |
| Bronze medal – third place | 2010 Vancouver | Team pursuit |
World Championships
| Bronze medal – third place | 2012 Heerenveen | Team pursuit |
- Updated on 22 February 2014

Katarzyna Bronisława Woźniak (born 5 October 1989) is a Polish speed skater. She is a silver and bronze medalist of the Olympic Games.

== Personal life ==
Katarzyna Woźniak was born in Warsaw, Poland. In 2005, she graduated the School of Sports Championships in Zakopane. She is studying at the Academy of Physical Education in Kraków. In 2010, she was awarded the Knight's Cross of the Order of the Rebirth of Poland. Katarzyna's fiancée is Konrad Niedźwiedzki also Polish speed skater.

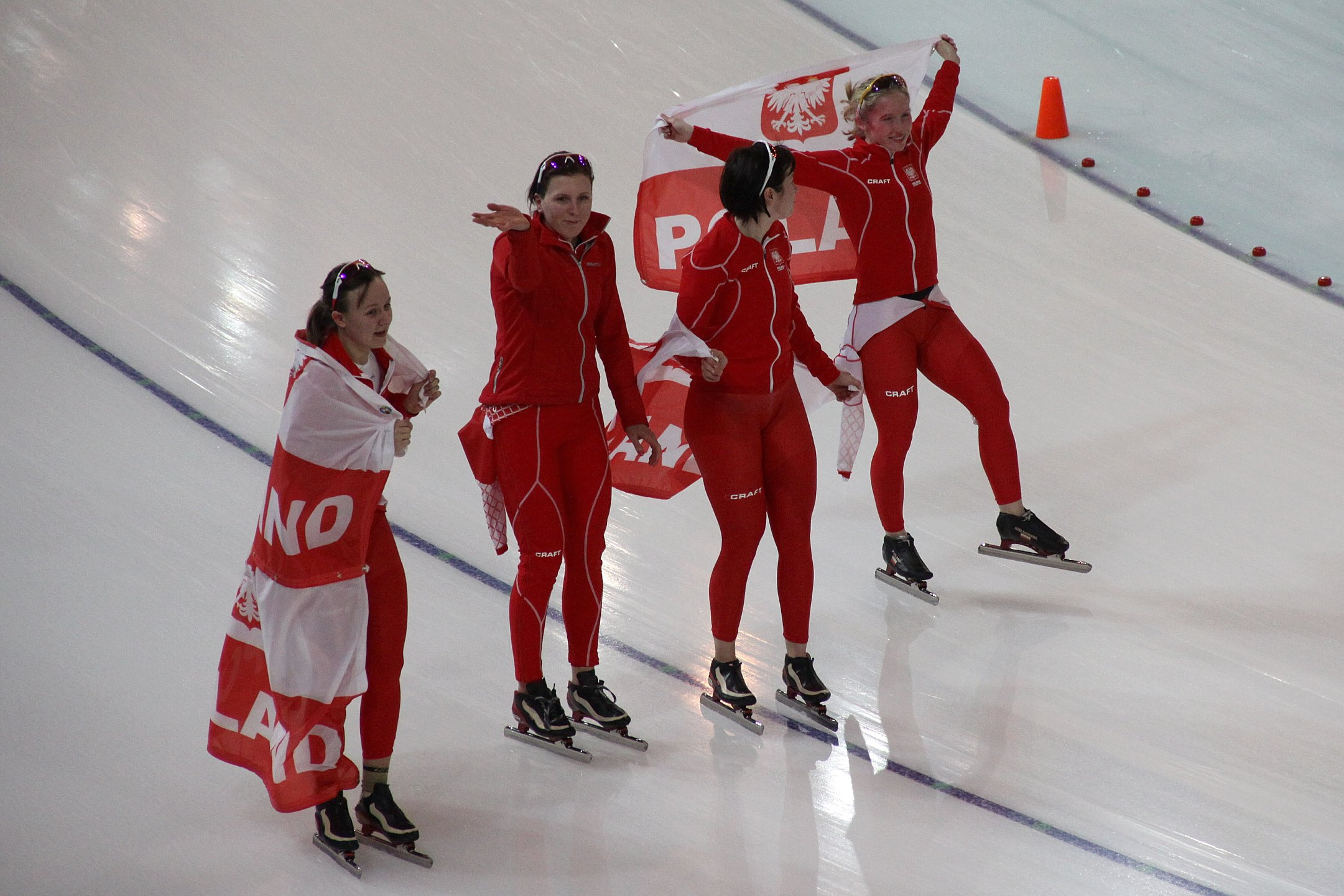
Polish team after winning bronze medal at Olympic Games in Vancouver.

== Olympic Games ==
At the Olympic Games in Vancouver 2010 she was 28th individual on distance 3000 m and won bronze medal with team Katarzyna Bachleda-Curuś, Natalia Czerwonka and Luiza Złotkowska. At the Olympic Games in Sochi 2014 she won silver medal with the same team and was 15th individual on distance 5000 m.
