= Brittany Schussler =

Canadian speed skater

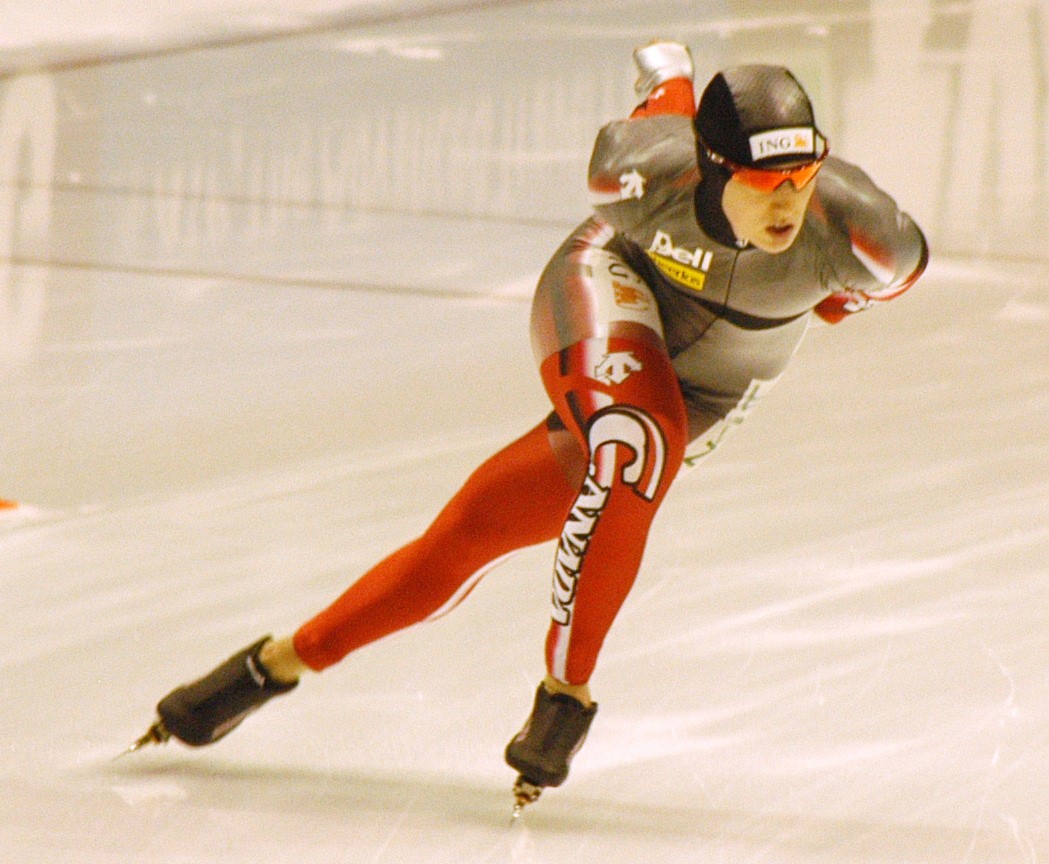
- Brittany Schussler participating at the 2008 World Cup at Heerenveen, Netherlands.

Personal information
- Born: April 21, 1985 (age 41) Winnipeg, Manitoba

Sport
- Country: Canada
- Club: Winnipeg Speed Skating

Achievements and titles
- World finals: World Cup; 2012 team pursuit
- Personal bests: 500 m – 39.08; 1000 m – 1:15.57; 1500 m – 1:54.85; 3000 m – 4:03.17; 5000 m – 7.04.36
Medal record
Women's speed skating
World Championships
Gold medal – first place	2009 Richmond	Team pursuit
Gold medal – first place	2011 Inzell	Team pursuit
Silver medal – second place	2008 Nagano	Team pursuit
Silver medal – second place	2012 Heerenveen	Team pursuit
World Junior Championships
Bronze medal – third place	2004 Roseville	Team pursuit
Bronze medal – third place	2003 Kushiro	Team pursuit
Bronze medal – third place	2003 Kushiro	1500 m

Brittany Schussler (born April 21, 1985) is a Canadian retired speed skater. She was a member of the national speed skating team from 2002 to 2014. Schussler's best individual performance was placing sixth in the 1500 metres at the World Championships in 2008 and she is a three times bronze medallist at the National Single Distance Championships. Her best team performances include a gold medal at a World Cup team pursuit (February 2008), first place in the World Cup standings for team pursuit in 2008 and a silver medal at the 2008 World Championships in Nagano.

== Professional speed skating career ==
Already at a young age Schussler at the World Junior Championships. In total she finished five times a Junior Championship. Her best individual results were the fourth places in Collalbo 2002 and Kushiro 2003. The best team pursuit results at Junior Championships were the bronze medals in Kushiro 2003 and Roseville 2004.

In the Olympic year 2002 Schussler won, still junior, the Canadian Allround Championship. This can be explained by the reason that all the Canadian top athletes were preparing for the Olympics in Salt Lake City and didn't go to the National Championship Allround. The two years after the 2002 Olympics she placed fifth both years. The next National Championship medal Schussler won was the bronze medal at the 1500 meters Single Distance Championship in 2006. In the next two years she repeated the win of a bronze medal at Canadian Single Distance Championship, in 2007 and 2008 she ended third at the 3000 meters.

2008 was the first year she participated at a senior World Championship. In Berlin she reached the 15th place at the World Allround Championships and at the World Single Distance Championships in Nagano she placed sixth on the 1500 meters. In Nagano she won her first senior medal with Christine Nesbitt and Kristina Groves in the Canadian pursuit team at the World Championships.

Schussler went to the 2010 Winter Olympics as a favourite to win the gold medal in the women's team pursuit, however they were unable to achieve that and the women's team finished out of the medals. She went home from those games extremely disappointed, Schussler said of her finish there that she was too focused on her results and not the act of racing.

She again qualified for her third Olympics to represent Canada at the 2014 Winter Olympics in Sochi. These were likely to be Schussler's last competitive games and Schussler was aware of that with her mind to finally achieve at least one Olympic medal. Schussler said of Sochi that "Going into Sochi, I want to focus on leaving knowing that I had the races I want to have at the Olympics. If that doesn't mean a medal, that's sad. But it would be more disappointing to leave knowing I didn't have the races I wanted to have and didn't deliver the performance I could have. I want to cross the finish line knowing I've shown what I'm made of and having done myself proud for the 21 years of training I've put into this moment."

== Personal ==
Schussler was introduced to speed skating at the age of 7. She was born and raised in the River Heights neighbourhood of Winnipeg until she was ten years old when she moved to the neighbourhood of Charleswood. As of 2014 Schussler has spent the last 11 years living and training in Calgary, Alberta, but she still listed Winnipeg her hometown.

== Speed skating ==
=== Personal records ===
Personal records
Women's speed skating
Event	Result	Date	Location	Notes
500 m	39.08	December 28, 2007	Olympic Oval, Calgary	
1000 m	1:15.57	November 17, 2013	Utah Olympic Oval, Salt Lake City	
1500 m	1:54.85	December 5, 2009	Olympic Oval, Calgary	
3000 m	4:03.17	December 11, 2009	Utah Olympic Oval, Salt Lake City	
5000 m	7:04.36	October 24, 2010	Olympic Oval, Calgary	

=== World records ===
World records
Women's speed skating
Event	Result	Date	Location	Notes
Team pursuit	2:55.79	March 12, 2009	Olympic Oval, Calgary	World record (with Kristina Groves and Christine Nesbitt) until beaten by Miho Takagi, Nana Takagi and Ayano Sato on November 10, 2017.

=== Tournament summary ===
Year	Canadian Distance	Canadian Allround	Canadian Sprint	Continental	World Allround	World Distance	World Cup	World Junior
99/00		–	–	–	–	–	–	5th
00/01		15th	–	–	–	–	–	8th
01/02		1st place, gold medalist(s)	–	–	–		–	4th 4th team pursuit
02/03		13th	5th	–	–	–	32nd 1000 m	4th (bronze) team pursuit
03/04		NC	5th	–	–	–	43rd 1000 m	10th (bronze) team pursuit
04/05		NC	NC	–	–	–	46th 1000 m	–
05/06	6th 1000 m (bronze) 1500 m 5th 3000 m			7th	–		44th 500 m 23rd 1000 m 36th 1500 m	–
06/07	7th 500 m 5th 1000 m 5th 1500 m (bronze) 3000 m			6th	–	–	30th 500 m 20th 1000 m 17th 1500 m 28th 3k/5k	–
07/08	9th 500 m 4th 1000 m 4th 1500 m (bronze) 3000 m 4th 5000 m			6th	NC15	6th 1500 m 13th 3000 m (silver) team pursuit	51st 500 m 13th 1000 m 12th 1500 m 28th 3k/5k (gold) team pursuit	–

- = no participation, NOTE: Schussler is senior speed skater since 2004 and does not participate at junior tournaments since.
NC = not qualified for the last distance, the number shows the final classification

Records
Preceded by (Germany) Daniela Anschütz, Anni Friesinger, Claudia Pechstein	Women's team pursuit speed skating world record December 6, 2009 – November 10, 2017 with Kristina Groves and Christine Nesbitt	Succeeded by (Japan) Miho Takagi, Nana Takagi, Ayano Sato
