= Natalia Czerwonka =

Polish speed skater (born 1988)

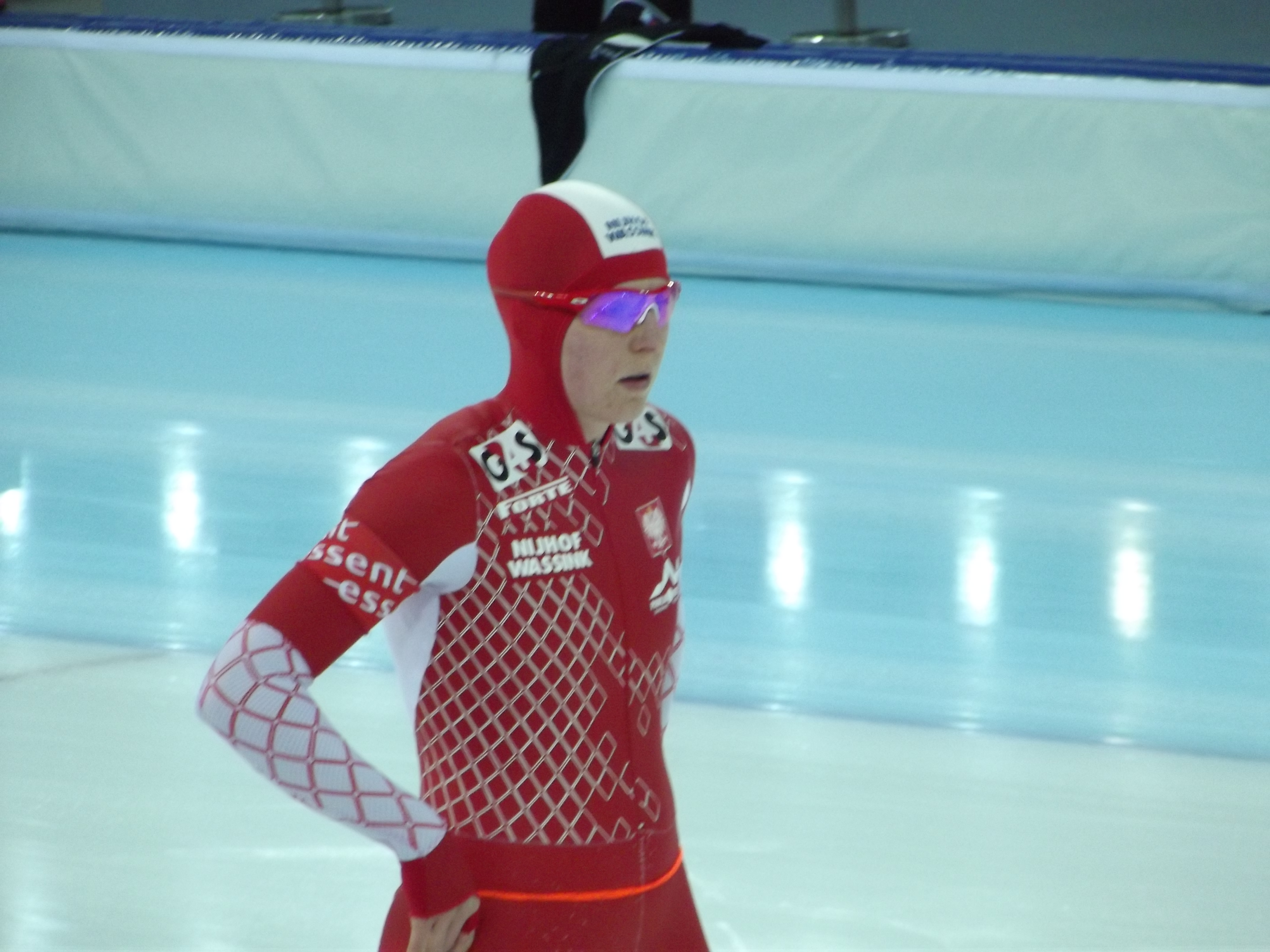
- Czerwonka in 2013

Personal information
- Born: 20 October 1988 (age 37) Lubin, Poland
- Height: 1.77 m (5 ft 10 in)
- Weight: 60 kg (132 lb)

Sport
- Country: Poland
- Sport: Speed skating
- Event: 1500 m
- Club: Arena, Tomaszów Mazowiecki
- Coached by: Krzysztof Niedźwiedzki
Medal record
Representing Poland
Event	1st	2nd	3rd
Olympic Games	0	1	0
World Championships	0	1	2
European Championships	0	0	1
Universiade	0	1	1
Total	0	3	4
Olympic Games
Silver medal – second place	2014 Sochi	Team pursuit
World Championships
Silver medal – second place	2013 Sochi	Team pursuit
Bronze medal – third place	2012 Heerenveen	Team pursuit
Bronze medal – third place	2020 Salt Lake City	Team sprint
European Championships
Bronze medal – third place	2020 Heerenven	Team sprint
Universiade
Silver medal – second place	2013 Trentino	1500 m
Bronze medal – third place	2009 Harbin	Team pursuit

Natalia Barbara Czerwonka (born 20 October 1988) is a Polish long track speed skater who participates in international competitions. In 2010, she was awarded the Knight's Cross of the Order of Polonia Restituta.

== Olympic Games ==
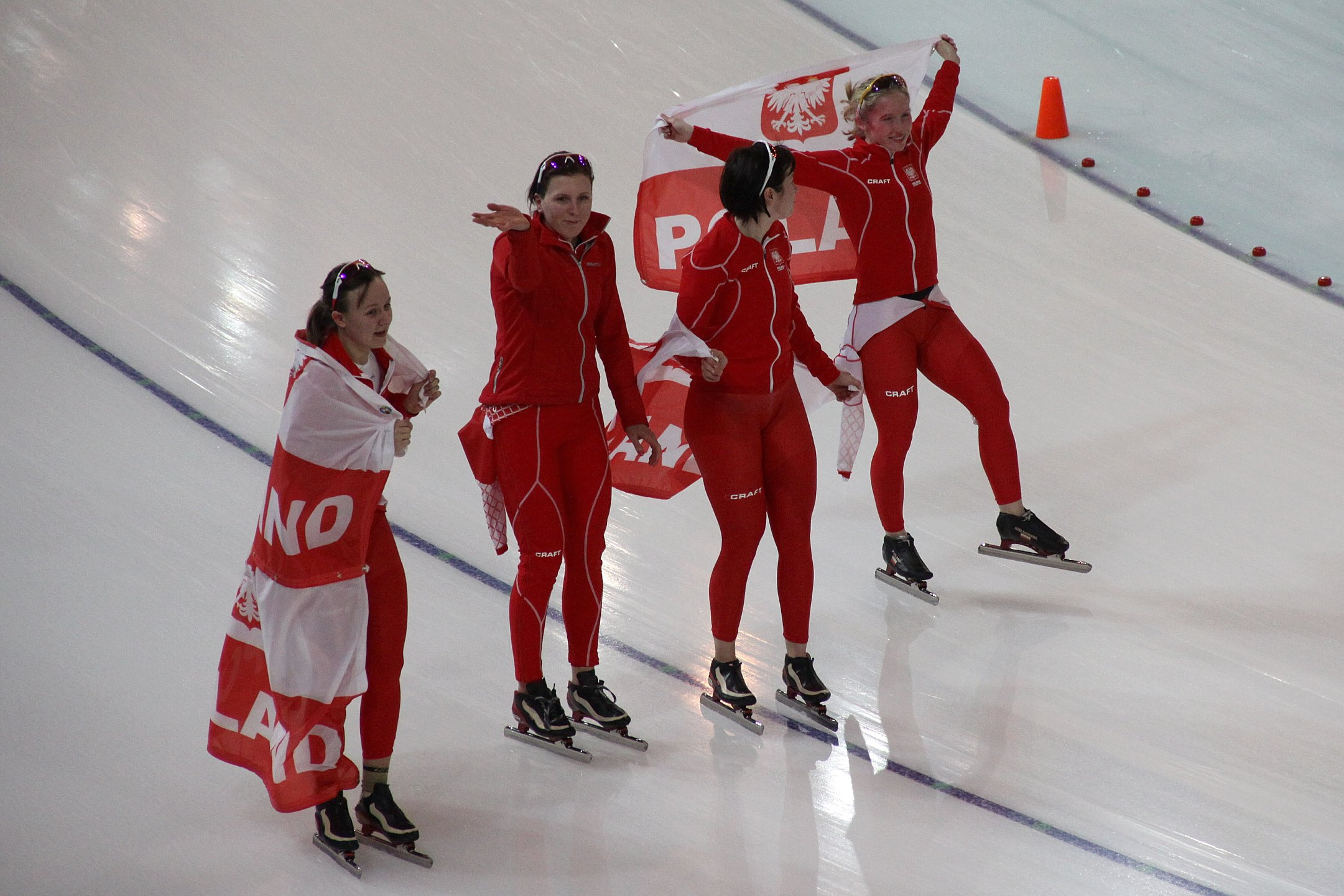
Polish team after winning the bronze medal at the Vancouver Winter Olympics.

At the 2010 Winter Olympics in Vancouver, she was a reserve when the Polish team won a bronze medal in the women's team pursuit. Czerwonka did not receive a medal because she did not participate in any heat, unlike Katarzyna Woźniak, Luiza Złotkowska and Katarzyna Bachleda-Curuś. At the 2014 Winter Olympics in Sochi, she won a silver medal with the same team as four years earlier.

== Personal records ==
Personal records
Women's speed skating
Event	Result	Date	Location	Notes
500 m	38.84	9 December 2017	Utah Olympic Oval, Salt Lake City	
1000 m	1:14.10	9 March 2019	Utah Olympic Oval, Salt Lake City	
1500 m	1:53.56	16 February 2020	Utah Olympic Oval, Salt Lake City	NR
3000 m	4:02.57	7 February 2020	Olympic Oval, Calgary	
5000 m	7:18.55	29 November 2013	Astana	

=== Career highlights ===
European Allround Championships
2008 – Kolomna, 17th
World Junior Allround Championships
2006 – Erfurt, 31st
National Championships
2007 – Warsaw, (bronze) 3rd at 1000 m
