= Katarzyna Bachleda-Curuś =

Polish speed skater (born 1942)

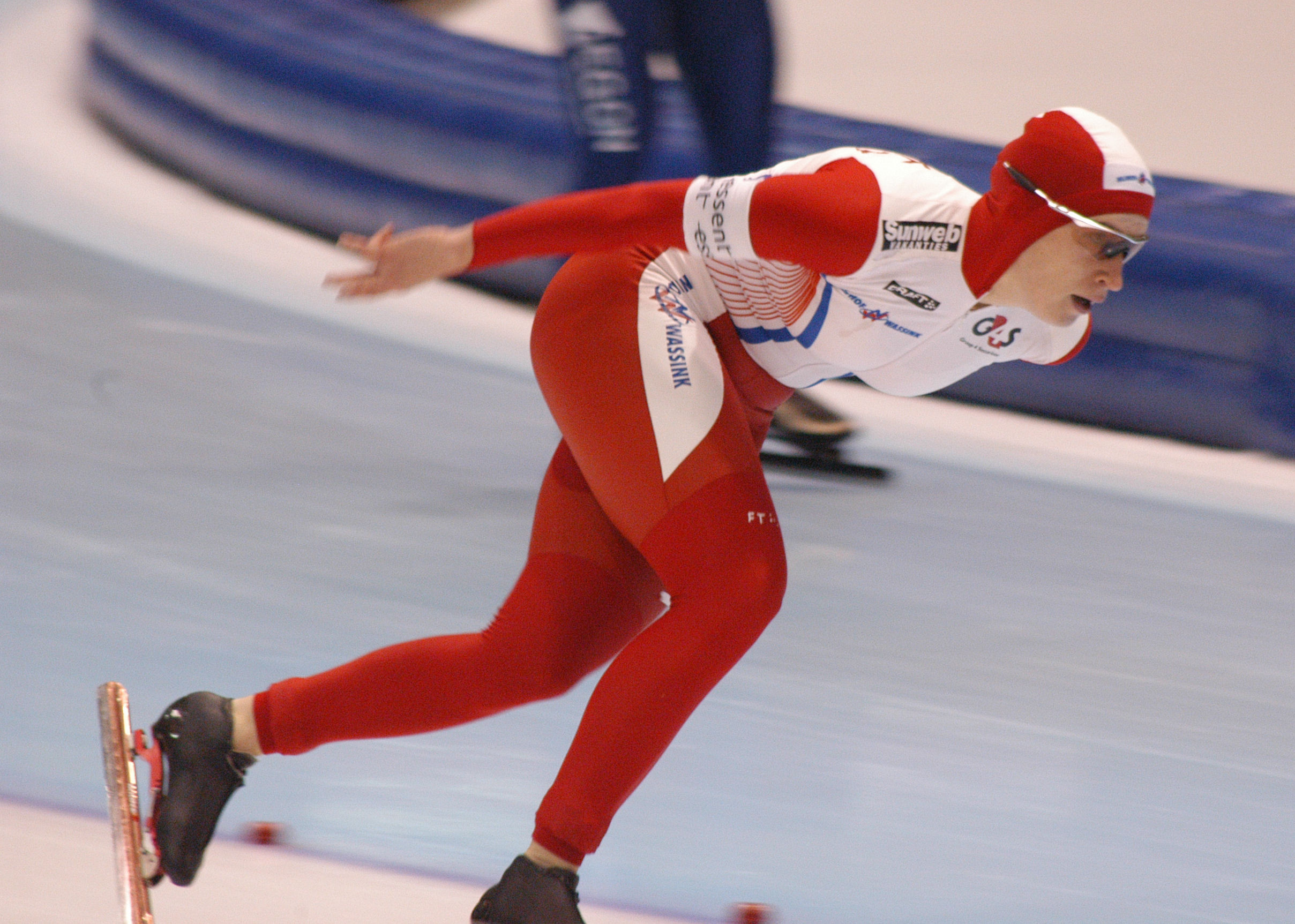

Personal information
- Born: Katarzyna Wójcicka; 1 January 1980 (age 46) Sanok, Podkarpackie Voivodeship, Poland
- Height: 170 cm (5 ft 7 in)
- Weight: 62 kg (137 lb)

Sport
- Country: Poland
- Sport: speed skating
- Club: LKS Poroniec Poronin
- Coached by: Krzysztof Niedźwiedzki
Medal record
Representing Poland
Event	1st	2nd	3rd
Olympic Games	0	1	1
World Championships	0	1	0
Universiade	1	1	1
Total	0	2	2
Olympic Games
Silver medal – second place	2014 Sochi	Team pursuit
Bronze medal – third place	2010 Vancouver	Team pursuit
World Single Distance Championships
Silver medal – second place	2013 Sochi	Team pursuit
Universiade
Gold medal – first place	2007 Turin	Individual 1500 m
Silver medal – second place	2007 Turin	Individual 3000 m
Bronze medal – third place	2007 Turin	Individual 1000 m

Katarzyna Anna Bachleda-Curuś (née Wójcicka, born 1 January 1980) is a Polish speed skater, who was born in Sanok and resides in Zakopane.

Wójcicka is specialised in allround championships as she performs well on all distances, but almost never finishes among the best on a single distance. In Poland she is however one of the best skaters they ever had and she already won fifteen national titles. In 2005, she made a lot of progression and became twelfth at the European Allround Championships and fourteenth at the World Allround Championships. She competed in the 2006 Winter Olympics, finishing tenth at the 3000 metres, eighth at the 1000 metres, eleventh at the 1500 metres and sixteenth at the 5000 metres. A year later she returned to Turin to participate in the 2007 Winter Universiade, winning the gold medal at the 1500 metres. She won the bronze medal in the team pursuit at the 2010 Winter Olympics. She participated at the 2014 Winter Olympics in three events. She was disqualified at the 3000 m, finished 6th at the 1500 m and won silver at the team pursuit.

In 2010, she was awarded the Knight's Cross of the Order of Polonia Restituta by President Lech Kaczyński.

== Personal records ==
Personal records
Women's speed skating
Event	Result	Date	Location	Notes
500 m	39.08	18 March 2006	Olympic Oval, Calgary	Polish record until beaten by Kaja Ziomek on 2 March 2018.
1000 m	1:15.39	13 December 2009	Utah Olympic Oval, Salt Lake City	Polish record until beaten by Natalia Czerwonka on 25 February 2017.
1500 m	1:53.95	16 November 2013	Utah Olympic Oval, Salt Lake City	Polish record until beaten by Natalia Czerwonka on 10 March 2019.
3000 m	4:02.12	15 November 2013	Utah Olympic Oval, Salt Lake City	Current Polish record.
5000 m	7:14.40	29 November 2013	Alau Ice Palace, Astana	
