= Noh Seon-yeong =

South Korean speed skater

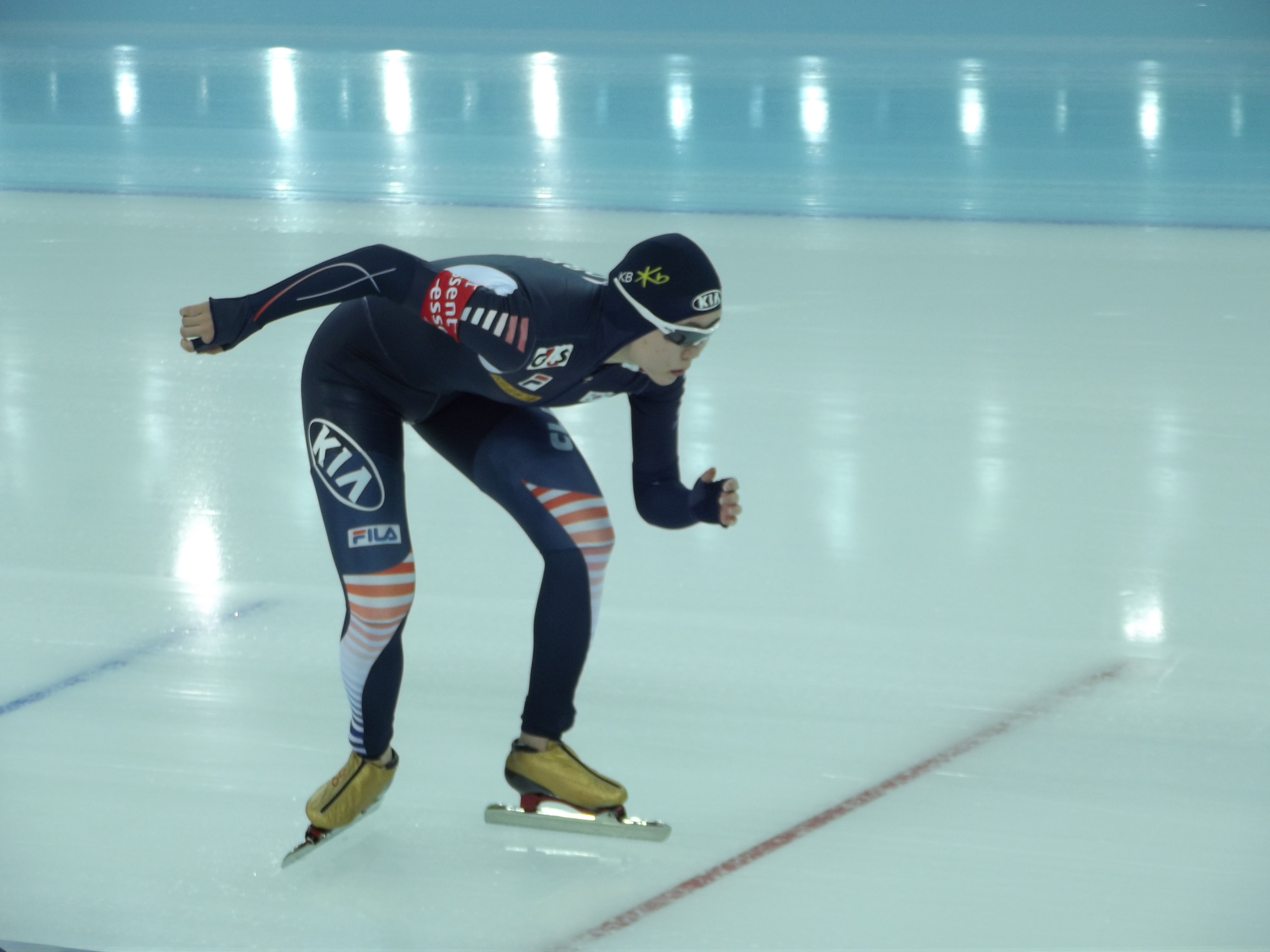
- Noh at the 2013 World Championships

Personal information
- Born: 19 October 1989 (age 36) Seoul, South Korea
- Height: 1.72 m (5 ft 8 in)
- Weight: 56 kg (123 lb)

Sport
- Country: South Korea
- Sport: Speed skating
Medal record
World Championships
Bronze medal – third place	2013 Sochi	Team pursuit
Asian Winter Games
Silver medal – second place	2017 Sapporo	Team pursuit
Gold medal – first place	2011 Astana/Almaty	Mass start
Gold medal – first place	2011 Astana/Almaty	Team pursuit
Silver medal – second place	2011 Astana-Almaty	1500 m
Winter Universiade
Silver medal – second place	2009 Harbin	Team pursuit
World Junior Championships
Gold medal – first place	2007 Innsbruck	Allround

Noh Seon-yeong (Korean: 노선영, born 19 October 1989) is a South Korean speed skater who holds the national record for the women's long track speed skating 1500 metres. She represented her country at four Winter Olympic Games.

== Speed skating career ==
Noh began skating at the age of 11. Five years later, she represented her country in the women's 1500 metres and the women's 3000 metres at the 2006 Winter Olympics. At the 2007 Asian Winter Games, she placed 4th in the women's 1500 metres and 5th in the women's 3000 metres. Her first major medal came at the 2007 World Junior Speed Skating Championships, where she attained gold in the allround competition. She then won silver in the women's team pursuit with Lee Ju-yeon and Kim Yoo-rim at the 2009 Winter Universiade. While she did not finish near the medals at the 2009 World Single Distance Speed Skating Championships, she did manage to set a new national record of 1:56.38 in the women's 1500 metres during the 2009–10 ISU Speed Skating World Cup.

Noh again represented her country in the women's 1500 metres and the women's 3000 metres at the 2010 Winter Olympics. She was also a member of the South Korean women's team pursuit team with Lee Ju-yeon and Park Do-yeong that finished last of eight. At the 2011 Asian Winter Games, she won gold in the women's mass start and women's team pursuit. She also came in second in the women's 1500 metres. Her next major medal would come at the 2013 World Championships, where Noh won bronze in the women's team pursuit with Park Do-yeong and Kim Bo-reum.

At the 2014 Winter Olympics, Noh marked her third attempt at the women's 1500 metres and the women's 3000 metres. The South Korean women's team pursuit team of Noh, Kim Bo-reum and Yang Shin-young would again finished last of eight. Her final podium was at the 2017 Asian Winter Games in the women's team pursuit, with the South Korean team of Noh, Kim Bo-reum and Park Ji-woo finishing in second behind the Japanese team.

Noh qualified for the South Korean team pursuit team at the 2018 Winter Olympics in October 2017. However, because International Skating Union rules state that skaters in the team pursuit must also compete in an individual event, Noh's position in the team was uncertain up until two weeks prior to the Olympics. The Korea Skating Union attributed this to an administrative error on their behalf. Two Russian skaters withdrew and Noh was entered into the women's 1500 metres, where she finished 14th. After failing to make the semi-finals in the women's team pursuit, her teammates Kim Bo-reum and Park Ji-woo appeared to blame her for the poor result. She was later seen crying and comforted by team coach Bob de Jong.

=== Personal records ===
Personal records
Women's speed skating
Event	Result	Date	Location	Notes
500 m	40.75	9 January 2010	Obihiro	
1000 m	1:17.89	24 February 2007	Innsbruck	
1500 m	1:56.38	12 December 2009	Salt Lake City	National record
3000 m	4.09.55	7 October 2006	Calgary	
5000 m	7:21.27	22 November 2008	Moscow	

== Personal life ==
She is the sister of late short track speed skater Noh Jin-Kyu.
