= Kim Bo-reum =

South Korean speed skater

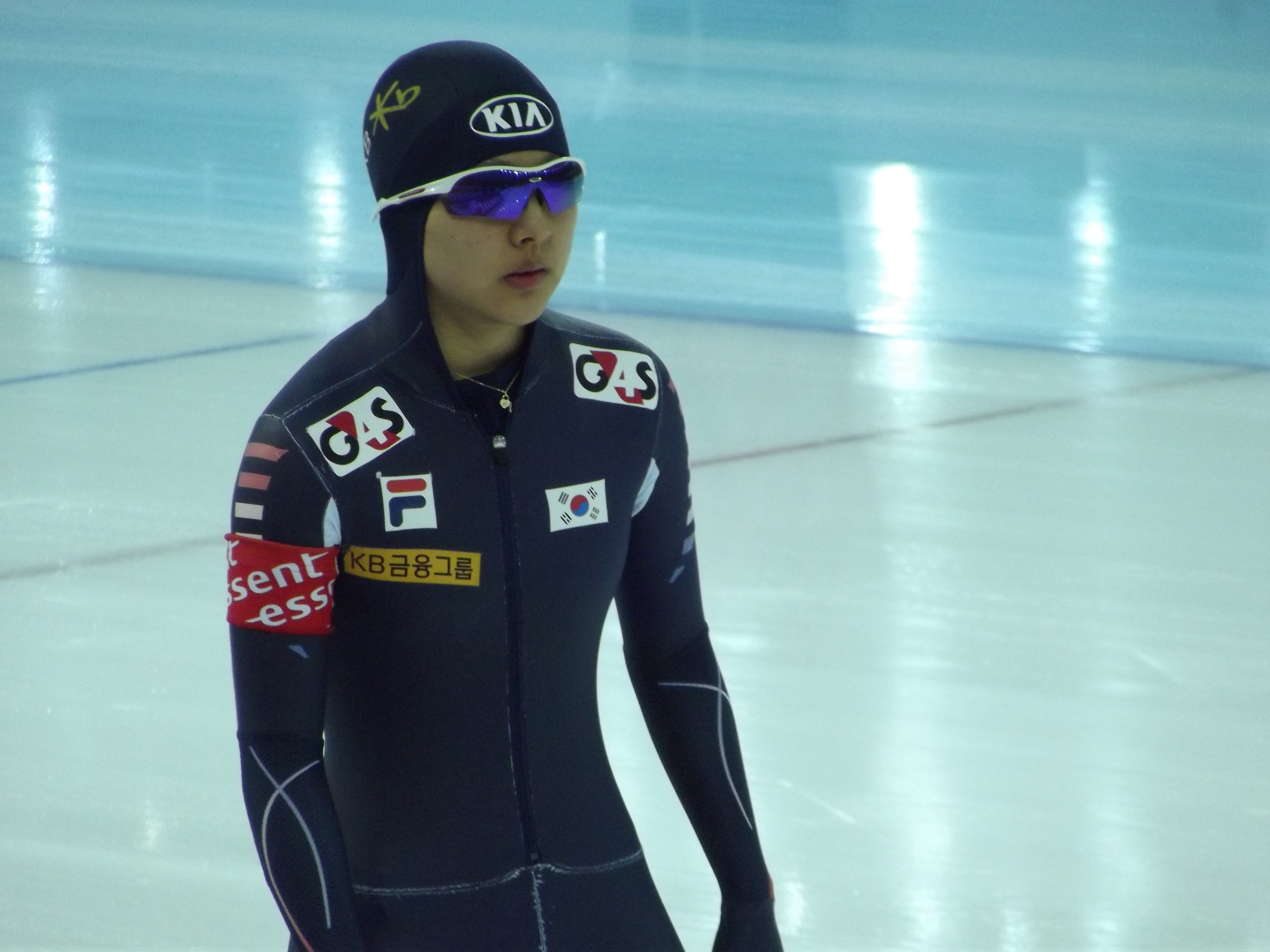
- Kim at the 2013 World Championships

Personal information
- Nationality: South Korean
- Born: 6 February 1993 (age 33) Daegu, South Korea
- Height: 1.65 m (5 ft 5 in)
- Weight: 48 kg (106 lb)

Sport
- Country: South Korea
- Sport: Short track (2007–2010); Long track (2010–present)
- Event: Mass start
- Club: Gangwon Provincial Government
Medal record
Women's long track speed skating
Representing South Korea
Olympic Games
Silver medal – second place	2018 Pyeongchang	Mass start
World Single Distance Championships
Gold medal – first place	2017 Gangneung	Mass start
Silver medal – second place	2016 Kolomna	Mass start
Silver medal – second place	2020 Salt Lake City	Mass start
Bronze medal – third place	2013 Sochi	Team pursuit
Asian Winter Games
Gold medal – first place	2017 Sapporo	5000m
Silver medal – second place	2017 Sapporo	3000m
Silver medal – second place	2017 Sapporo	Team pursuit
Bronze medal – third place	2017 Sapporo	Mass start
Silver medal – second place	2011 Astana–Almaty	3000m
Four Continents Championships
Silver medal – second place	2020 Milwaukee	Mass start
Winter Universiade
Gold medal – first place	2013 Trentino	1500m
Gold medal – first place	2013 Trentino	Team pursuit
Silver medal – second place	2013 Trentino	3000m

Kim Bo-reum (Korean: 김보름, born 6 February 1993) is a South Korean speed skater. She is the current South Korean record holder in the women's long track speed skating 3000 and 5000 metres. She is a two-time Olympian and specialises in the women's mass start.

== Speed skating career ==
Kim started short track speed skating as a child. In 2007, at the age of 14, she was selected for the South Korean national junior team and won the gold medal in the women's 2000-metre relay at the Asian Junior Short Track Speed Skating Championships. At the end of April 2010, however, Kim turned to long track speed skating after being inspired by compatriot Lee Seung-hoon, who had similarly switched formats and medalled at the 2010 Winter Olympics. She won her first major medal at the 2011 Asian Winter Games, with a silver in the women's 3000 metres and placed fourth in the women's 5000 metres.

At the 2013 World Single Distance Speed Skating Championships, Kim won bronze in the women's team pursuit with Noh Seon-yeong and Park Do-yeong. She also placed 11th in the women's 1500 metres and 9th in the women's 3000 metres. Later that year, she participated at the 2013 Winter Universiade, winning gold in the women's 1500 metres and women's team pursuit (with Park Do-yeong and Yang Shin-young), as well as silver in the women's 3000 metres and women's 5000 metres.

Kim participated in the Olympics for the first time during the 2014 Winter Olympics, in which she ranked 13th place at the women's 3000 metres and 21st place at the women's 1500 metres Along with Noh Seon-yeong and Yang Shin-young, Kim was also part of the South Korean team which participated in the quarter-finals of the women's team pursuit. She tore her anterior cruciate ligament during the women's 5000 metres event, which limited her appearances for the rest of the season.

After the underwhelming performance at the 2015 World Championships due to the injury, Kim came back with a new national record of 7:05.55 for the women's 5000 metres during the 2015–16 ISU Speed Skating World Cup. At the 2016 World Championships, Kim won silver in the women's mass start and placed 7th in the women's 3000 metres. She bettered that result at the 2017 World Championships by winning gold in the women's mass start and placing 6th in the women's 3000 metres with a new national record time of 4:03.85. She was also part of the South Korean women's team pursuit team with Noh Seon-yeong and Park Ji-woo, which finished 5th. At the 2017 Asian Winter Games, Kim won gold in the women's 5000 metres, silver in the women's 3000 metres and the women's team pursuit, and a bronze in the women's mass start.

During the 2018 Winter Olympics, the Winter Olympic games that were held in her home country South Korea for the first time, Kim won the silver medal at the women's mass start in speed skating, which was her first ever medal from the Olympics. She also participated in the women's 3000 metres event.

After failing to advance to the semi-finals of the women's team pursuit in the 2018 Olympics, Kim received public backlash after her interview, which seemingly attributed the team's loss to her teammate Noh Seon-yeong. She later made a public apology. Although Noh proceeded to claim that she was the victim of Kim's bullying, which hugely intensified the public anger against Kim, the subsequent lawsuit revealed that Kim was the actual victim who had been constantly bullied by Noh. Kim later recalled in 2022 that what hurt the most was being accused as a bully when she was the victim.

Kim again represented South Korea in the women's mass start in the 2022 Olympics, finishing 5th in the final. After the match, expressing her happiness to be back in the Olympics; Kim cried during the interview and expressed that she could keep going on due to the support from many people despite her worry that no one would cheer for her after the incident.

In May 2022, Kim signed with Bonbu ENT, an entertainment agency. She plans to debut in the entertainment industry.

=== Personal records ===
Personal records
Women's speed skating
Event	Result	Date	Location	Notes
500 m	40.68	7 March 2015	Olympic Oval, Calgary	
1000 m	1:18.12	9 October 2015	Utah Olympic Oval, Salt Lake City	
1500 m	1:56.12	16 November 2013	Utah Olympic Oval, Salt Lake City	
3000 m	4:03.85	9 February 2017	Gangneung Oval, Gangneung	Current South Korean record.
5000 m	7:05.55	20 November 2015	Utah Olympic Oval, Salt Lake City	Current South Korean record.

== Filmography ==
=== Television show ===
Year	Title	Role	Ref.
2022	Queen of Wrestling	Player	
