= Luiza Złotkowska =

Polish speed skater

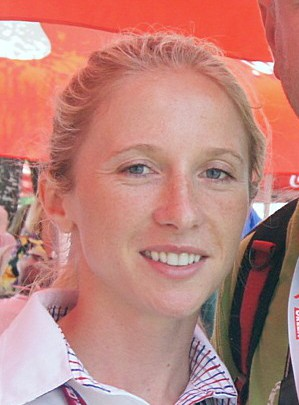

Personal information
- Born: 25 May 1986 (age 40) Warsaw, Poland
- Height: 1.60 m (5 ft 3 in)
- Weight: 52 kg (115 lb)
- Life partner: Jan Szymański

Sport
- Country: Poland
- Sport: speed skating
- Club: LKS Poroniec
- Coached by: Witold Mazur
Medal record
Women's speed skating
Representing Poland
Olympic Games
Silver medal – second place	2014 Sochi	Team pursuit
Bronze medal – third place	2010 Vancouver	Team pursuit
World Championships
Silver medal – second place	2013 Sochi	Team pursuit
Bronze medal – third place	2012 Heerenveen	Team pursuit
Universiade
Bronze medal – third place	2009 Harbin	3000 m
Bronze medal – third place	2009 Harbin	5000 m
Bronze medal – third place	2009 Harbin	Team pursuit
Medal summary
Event	1st	2nd	3rd
Olympic Games	0	1	1
World Championships	0	1	1
Universiade	0	0	3
Total	0	2	5

Luiza Złotkowska (born 25 May 1986) is a Polish speed skater. She is an Olympic silver and bronze medalist, and held the Polish record on the 5000 m distance from February 2021 to December 2022.

== Speed skating career ==
=== Olympic Games ===
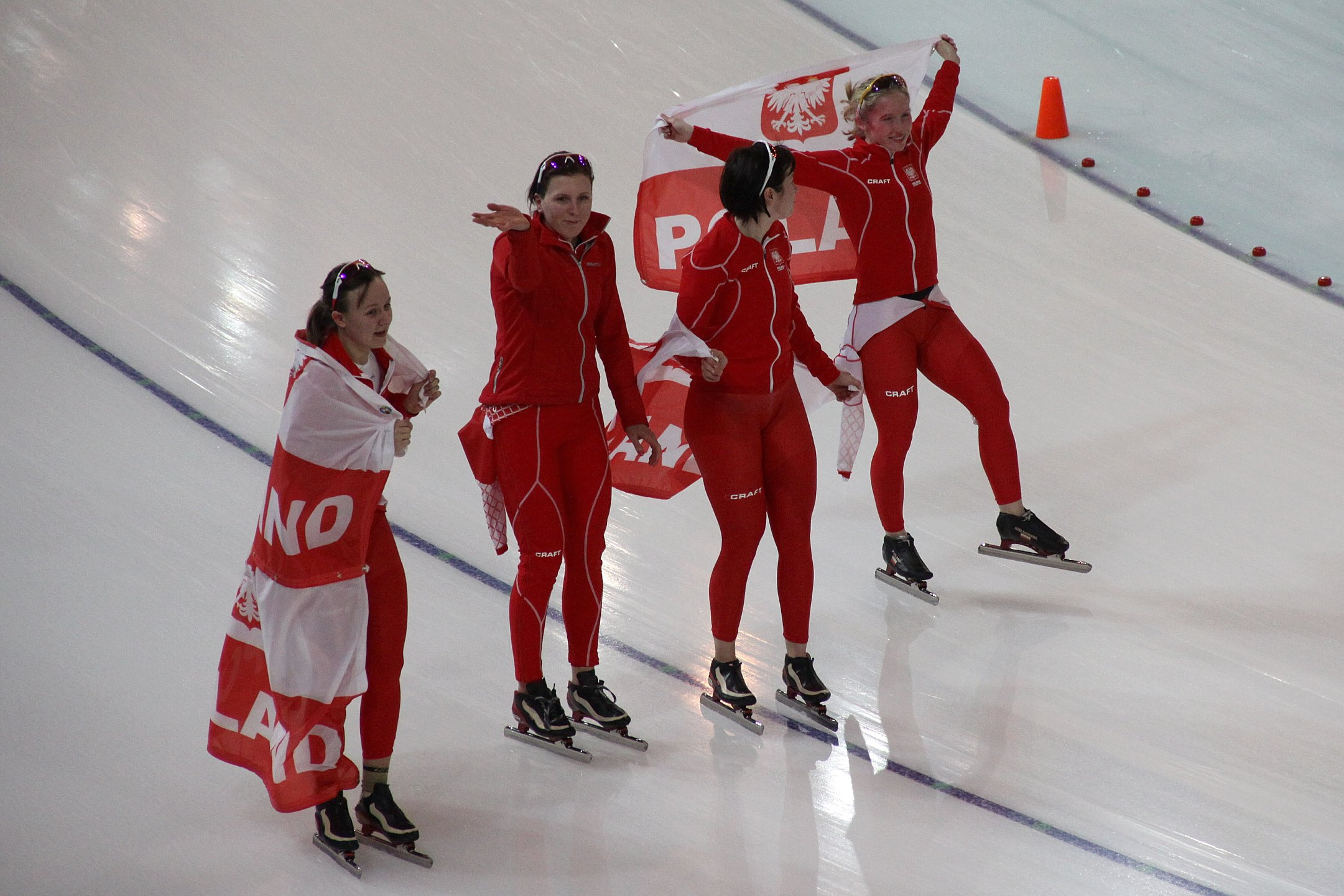
The Polish team after winning the bronze medal in team pursuit at the 2010 Winter Olympics in Vancouver.

At the 2010 Winter Olympics in Vancouver, she won a bronze medal in the women's team pursuit together with Katarzyna Woźniak, Natalia Czerwonka and Katarzyna Bachleda-Curuś. Individually, she placed 34th in the 1500 metres and 24th in the 3000 metres. At the 2014 Winter Olympics in Sochi, she won silver medal in the team competition with Katarzyna Woźniak, Natalia Czerwonka and Katarzyna Bachleda-Curuś.

=== Personal records ===
Personal records
Women's speed skating
Event	Result	Date	Location	Notes
500 m	39.13	28 February 2016	Eisstadion Inzell, Inzell	
1000 m	1:15.46	10 November 2013	Olympic Oval, Calgary	
1500 m	1:54.77	16 November 2013	Utah Olympic Oval, Salt Lake City	
3000 m	4:02.37	15 November 2013	Utah Olympic Oval, Salt Lake City	
5000 m	7:07.02	18 February 2011	Utah Olympic Oval, Salt Lake City	Polish record until beaten by Magdalena Czyszczoń on 16 December 2022.

== Personal life ==
Złotkowska was born in Warsaw, Poland, but lives in Zielonka. In 2005, she graduated from the School of Sports Championships in Zakopane. She is also a graduate of the Academy of Physical Education in Kraków. In 2010, she was awarded the Knight's Cross of the Order of the Rebirth of Poland, in 2014, she was awarded the Officer's Cross of the Order of the Rebirth of Poland. Złotkowska's fiancé is Jan Szymański, also a Polish speed skater.
