= 2013–14 ISU Speed Skating World Cup – World Cup 4 – Women's 1500 metres =

The women's 1500 metres race of the 2013–14 ISU Speed Skating World Cup 4, held at Sportforum Hohenschönhausen, in Berlin, Germany, took place on 7 December 2013.

Ireen Wüst of the Netherlands won the race, while Katarzyna Bachleda-Curuś of Poland finishing second, and Lotte van Beek of the Netherlands talking third. Jorien ter Mors of the Netherlands won the Division B race with a time that would have secured her victory in Division A.

== Results ==
The race took place on Saturday, 7 December, with Division B scheduled in the morning session, at 10:00, and Division A scheduled in the afternoon session, at 14:29.

=== Division A ===
Rank	Name	Nat.	Pair	Lane	Time	WC points	GWC points
1st place, gold medalist(s)	Ireen Wüst	(Netherlands)	10	o	1:55.33	100	10
2nd place, silver medalist(s)	Katarzyna Bachleda-Curuś	(Poland)	5	i	1:55.93	80	8
3rd place, bronze medalist(s)	Lotte van Beek	(Netherlands)	9	o	1:56.28	70	7
4	Marrit Leenstra	(Netherlands)	4	i	1:56.45	60	6
5	Yekaterina Shikhova	(Russia)	3	i	1:56.82	50	5
6	Brittany Bowe	(United States)	10	i	1:57.03	45	—
7	Yekaterina Lobysheva	(Russia)	6	i	1:57.34	40	
8	Ida Njåtun	(Norway)	8	i	1:57.90	36	
9	Claudia Pechstein	(Germany)	8	o	1:58.12	32	
10	Luiza Złotkowska	(Poland)	6	o	1:58.420	28	
11	Brittany Schussler	(Canada)	7	i	1:58.422	24	
12	Karolína Erbanová	(Czech Republic)	3	o	1:58.534	21	
13	Monique Angermüller	(Germany)	7	o	1:58.537	18	
14	Yuliya Skokova	(Russia)	9	i	1:58.84	16	
15	Ayaka Kikuchi	(Japan)	2	o	1:59.07	14	
16	Olga Graf	(Russia)	5	o	1:59.50	12	
17	Natalia Czerwonka	(Poland)	1	i	1:59.56	10	
18	Jilleanne Rookard	(United States)	2	i	1:59.90	8	
19	Maki Tabata	(Japan)	4	o	2:00.68	6	
20	Nana Takagi	(Japan)	1	o	2:00.83	5	

=== Division B ===
Rank	Name	Nat.	Pair	Lane	Time	WC points
1	Jorien ter Mors	(Netherlands)	2	i	1:54.88	25
2	Jorien Voorhuis	(Netherlands)	13	i	1:57.93	19
3	Kali Christ	(Canada)	13	o	1:58.29	15
4	Olga Fatkulina	(Russia)	10	i	1:58.55	11
5	Zhao Xin	(China)	11	o	2:00.72	8
6	Li Qishi	(China)	9	i	2:00.74	6
7	Jelena Peeters	(Belgium)	9	o	2:00.801	4
8	Nao Kodaira	(Japan)	12	o	2:00.804	2
9	Yang Shin-young	(South Korea)	10	o	2:00.90	1
10	Noh Seon-yeong	(South Korea)	12	i	2:00.94	—
11	Yuki Matsuda	(Japan)	11	i	2:01.14	
12	Anna Rokita	(Austria)	5	i	2:01.33	
13	Hege Bøkko	(Norway)	6	i	2:02.18	
14	Kelly Gunther	(United States)	7	o	2:02.25	
15	Mari Hemmer	(Norway)	8	i	2:02.29	
16	Kaitlyn McGregor	(Switzerland)	6	o	2:02.43	
17	Katarzyna Woźniak	(Poland)	8	o	2:03.36	
18	Petra Acker	(United States)	1	i	2:03.48	
19	Roxanne Dufter	(Germany)	1	o	2:03.79	
20	Camilla Hallås-Farestveit	(Norway)	4	o	2:03.88	
21	Johanna Östlund	(Sweden)	5	o	2:04.12	
22	Tatyana Mikhailova	(Belarus)	4	i	2:04.55	
23	Tatyana Sokirko	(Kazakhstan)	3	i	2:04.69	
24	Francesca Bettrone	(Italy)	7	i	2:06.49	
25	Nikola Zdráhalová	(Czech Republic)	3	o	2:09.51	
26	Kaylin Irvine	(Canada)	2	o	WDR	
