= 2015 World Single Distance Speed Skating Championships – Women's 3000 metres =

Women's 3000 metres at the 2015 World Single Distance Speed Skating Championships
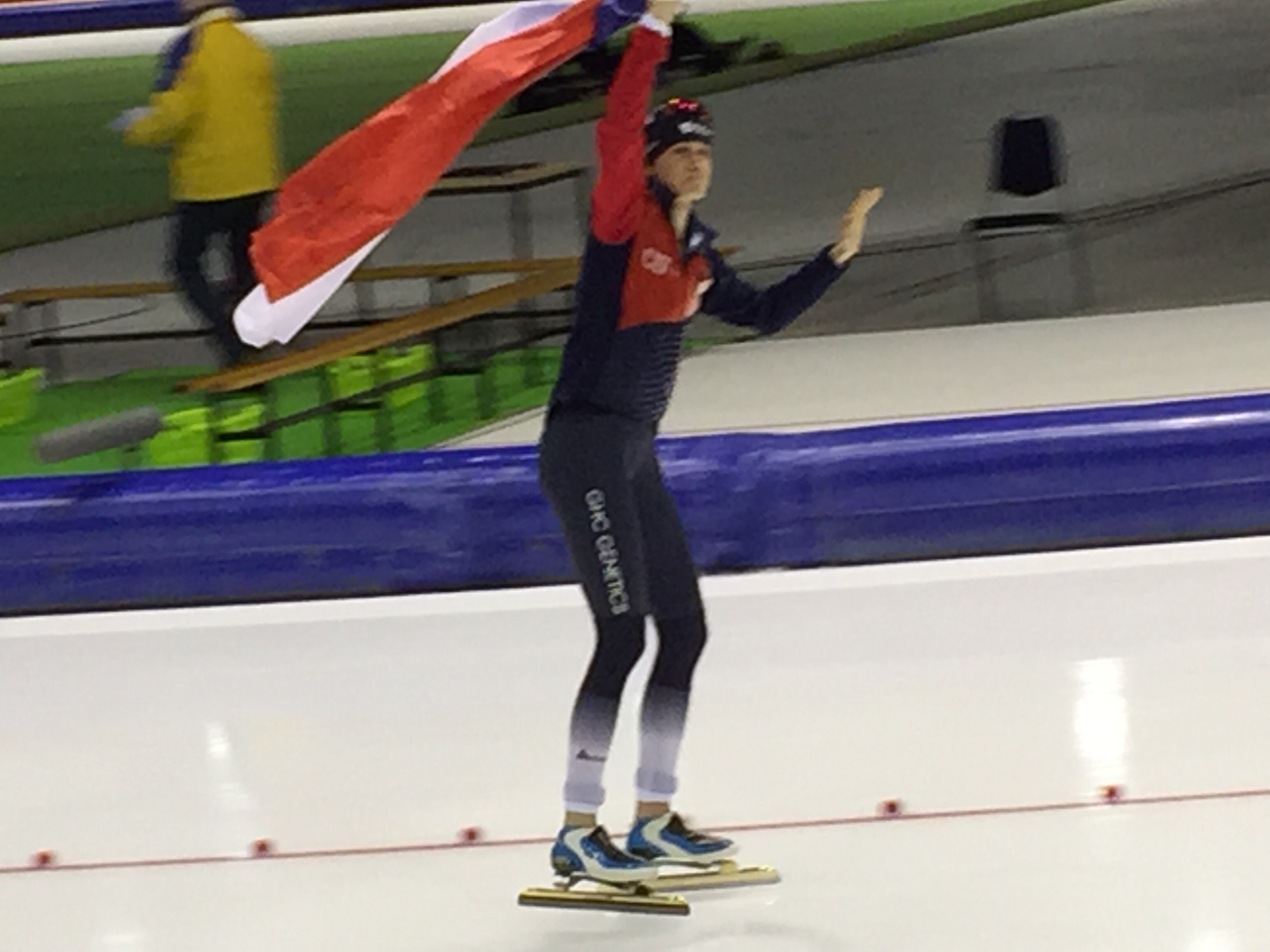
- Sablikova celebrating her victory
- Venue: Thialf, Heerenveen
- Date: 12 February 2015
- Competitors: 20 from 12 nations
- Winning time: 4:02.17

Medalists
gold medal	Martina Sáblíková	Czech Republic
silver medal	Ireen Wüst	Netherlands
bronze medal	Marije Joling	Netherlands

The Women's 3000 metres race of the 2015 World Single Distance Speed Skating Championships was held on 12 February 2015.

== Results ==
The race was started at 18:00.

Rank	Pair	Lane	Name	Country	Time	Diff
1st place, gold medalist(s)	10	i	Martina Sáblíková	CZE	4:02.17	
2nd place, silver medalist(s)	10	o	Ireen Wüst	NED	4:03.46	+1.29
3rd place, bronze medalist(s)	7	o	Marije Joling	NED	4:05.51	+3.34
4	8	i	Jorien Voorhuis	NED	4:05.76	+3.59
5	9	i	Claudia Pechstein	GER	4:05.95	+3.78
6	8	o	Bente Kraus	GER	4:09.75	+7.58
7	9	o	Ivanie Blondin	CAN	4:09.85	+7.68
8	7	i	Olga Graf	RUS	4:10.32	+8.15
9	4	i	Luiza Złotkowska	POL	4:11.04	+8.87
10	5	i	Anna Chernova	RUS	4:11.82	+9.65
11	6	o	Ida Njåtun	NOR	4:12.00	+9.83
12	4	o	Ayaka Kikuchi	JPN	4:14.61	+12.44
13	3	o	Natalya Voronina	RUS	4:14.90	+12.73
14	1	o	Marina Zueva	BLR	4:15.09	+12.92
15	1	i	Isabell Ost	GER	4:15.34	+13.17
16	2	o	Francesca Lollobrigida	ITA	4:15.47	+13.30
17	3	i	Katarzyna Woźniak	POL	4:15.75	+13.58
18	6	i	Nana Takagi	JPN	4:17.21	+15.04
19	5	o	Kim Bo-reum	KOR	4:17.82	+15.65
20	2	i	Zhao Xin	CHN	4:18.25	+16.08
