= 2013–14 ISU Speed Skating World Cup – World Cup 4 – Women's 3000 metres =

The women's 3000 metres race of the 2013–14 ISU Speed Skating World Cup 4, arranged in Sportforum Hohenschönhausen, in Berlin, Germany, was held on 6 December 2013.

Martina Sáblíková of the Czech Republic took her third straight win, while Claudia Pechstein of Germany was the runner-up for the third straight time, and Ireen Wüst of the Netherlands took third place. Jorien ter Mors won the Division B race on a time that would have given her the win in Division A.

== Results ==
The race took place on Friday, 6 December, with Division B scheduled in the morning session, at 11:38, and Division A scheduled in the afternoon session, at 16:00.

=== Division A ===
Rank	Name	Nat.	Pair	Lane	Time	WC points	GWC points
1st place, gold medalist(s)	Martina Sáblíková	(Czech Republic)	8	i	4:02.25	100	10
2nd place, silver medalist(s)	Claudia Pechstein	(Germany)	8	o	4:02.96	80	8
3rd place, bronze medalist(s)	Ireen Wüst	(Netherlands)	2	i	4:03.50	70	7
4	Katarzyna Bachleda-Curuś	(Poland)	5	i	4:03.90	60	6
5	Antoinette de Jong	(Netherlands)	7	i	4:04.01	50	5
6	Jorien Voorhuis	(Netherlands)	6	o	4:04.97	45	—
7	Ida Njåtun	(Norway)	7	o	4:06.00	40	
8	Linda de Vries	(Netherlands)	4	o	4:06.66	35	
9	Olga Graf	(Russia)	3	o	4:07.49	30	
10	Masako Hozumi	(Japan)	5	o	4:08.36	25	
11	Jilleanne Rookard	(United States)	1	i	4:09.12	21	
12	Luiza Złotkowska	(Poland)	3	i	4:09.47	18	
13	Shiho Ishizawa	(Japan)	6	i	4:09.50	16	
14	Nana Takagi	(Japan)	4	i	4:09.52	14	
15	Bente Kraus	(Germany)	1	o	4:13.09	12	
16	Ayaka Kikuchi	(Japan)	2	o	4:13.33	10	

=== Division B ===
Rank	Name	Nat.	Pair	Lane	Time	WC points
1	Jorien ter Mors	(Netherlands)	2	i	4:02.23	32
2	Natalia Czerwonka	(Poland)	13	i	4:07.34	27
3	Ivanie Blondin	(Canada)	13	o	4:08.19	23
4	Mari Hemmer	(Norway)	12	i	4:08.85	19
5	Brittany Schussler	(Canada)	16	o	4:09.03	15
6	Francesca Lollobrigida	(Italy)	14	i	4:09.04	11
7	Anna Chernova	(Russia)	12	o	4:10.69	9
8	Liu Jing	(China)	8	o	4:10.75	7
9	Anna Rokita	(Austria)	10	i	4:11.21	6
10	Isabell Ost	(Germany)	8	i	4:11.24	5
11	Jelena Peeters	(Belgium)	15	o	4:11.72	4
12	Stephanie Beckert	(Germany)	16	i	4:12.11	3
13	Katarzyna Woźniak	(Poland)	15	i	4:12.16	2
14	Jennifer Bay	(Germany)	14	o	4:12.92	1
15	Yang Shin-young	(South Korea)	11	i	4:13.45	—
16	Noh Seon-yeong	(South Korea)	10	o	4:13.47	
17	Miho Takagi	(Japan)	11	o	4:13.75	
18	Park Do-yeong	(South Korea)	9	o	4:14.26	
19	Yevgeniya Dmitriyeva	(Russia)	2	o	4:16.36	
20	Jun Ye-jin	(South Korea)	6	i	4:16.70	
21	Petra Acker	(United States)	9	i	4:16.86	
22	Camilla Hallås-Farestveit	(Norway)	7	i	4:16.88	
23	Tatyana Ushakova	(Russia)	3	o	4:17.95	
24	Daniela Oltean	(Romania)	6	o	4:18.75	
25	Kaitlyn McGregor	(Switzerland)	1	o	4:19.83	
26	Theresa Cliff-Ryan	(United States)	1	i	4:22.45	
27	Johanna Östlund	(Sweden)	4	i	4:22.61	
28	Tatyana Mikhailova	(Belarus)	5	i	4:23.91	
29	Saskia Alusalu	(Finland)	4	o	4:24.66	
30	Yelena Urvantseva	(Kazakhstan)	7	o	4:25.64	
31	Sara Bak-Briand	(Denmark)	5	o	4:27.95	
32	Nikola Zdráhalová	(Czech Republic)	3	i	4:33.06	
