= 2016–17 ISU Speed Skating World Cup – Women's 1500 metres =

The 1500 meters distance for women in the 2016–17 ISU Speed Skating World Cup will be contested over six races on six occasions, out of a total of World Cup occasions for the season, with the first occasion taking place in Harbin, Canada, on 11–13 November 2016, and the final occasion taking place in Stavanger, Norway, on 11–12 March 2017.

The defending champion is Brittany Bowe of United States.

== Top three ==
Position	Athlete	Points	Previous season
1	(United States) Heather Bergsma	480	2nd
2	(Netherlands) Marrit Leenstra	4600	3rd
3	(Japan) Miho Takagi	430	6th

== Race medallists ==
WC #	Location	Date	Gold	Time	Silver	Time	Bronze	Time	Report
1	Harbin, China	13 November	Heather Bergsma; United States	1:57.00	Marrit Leenstra; Netherlands	1:57.64	Ireen Wüst; Netherlands	1:58.18	
2	Nagano, Japan	20 November	Heather Bergsma; United States	1:55.29	Ireen Wüst; Netherlands	1:55.50	Marrit Leenstra; Netherlands	1:55.94	
3	Astana, Kazakhstan	4 December	Miho Takagi; Japan	1:56.36	Marrit Leenstra; Netherlands	1:56.89	Jorien ter Mors; Netherlands	1:57.28	
4	Heerenveen, Netherlands	10 December	Ireen Wüst; Netherlands	1:55.34	Heather Bergsma; United States	1:55.99	Miho Takagi; South Korea	1:56.08	
5	Berlin, Germany	28 January	Ireen Wüst; Netherlands	1:55.85	Marrit Leenstra; Netherlands	1:56.12	Martina Sáblíková; Czech Republic	1:56.36	
6	Stavanger, Norway	12 March	Heather Bergsma; United States	1:54.92	Miho Takagi; South Korea	1:55.50	Martina Sáblíková; Czech Republic	1:56.62	

== Standings ==
#	Name	Nat.	HRB	NGN	AST	HVN	BER	STA	Total
1	Heather Bergsma	(United States)	100	100	—	80	50	150	480
2	Marrit Leenstra	(Netherlands)	80	70	80	60	80	90	460
3	Miho Takagi	(Japan)	50	50	100	70	40	120	430
4	Ireen Wüst	(Netherlands)	70	80	—	100	100	—	350
5	Martina Sáblíková	(Czech Republic)	45	60	—	—	70	104	279
6	Olga Graf	(Russia)	28	28	60	32	36	76	260
7	Antoinette de Jong	(Netherlands)	60	45	45	—	45	40	235
8	Melissa Wijfje	(Netherlands)	32	40	36	45	28	36	217
9	Misaki Oshigiri	(Japan)	36	36	28	36	18	24	178
10	Yekaterina Shikhova	(Russia)	4	25	50	16	60	21	176
11	Natalia Czerwonka	(Poland)	11	0	40	50	24	28	153
12	Yekaterina Lobysheva	(Russia)	24	24	18	40	32	—	138
13	Roxanne Dufter	(Germany)	15	16	32	21	14	32	130
14	Ida Njåtun	(Norway)	21	18	8	—	15	45	107
15	Marije Joling	(Netherlands)	40	32	—	—	21	—	93
16	Mia Manganello	(United States)	18	10	21	28	—	—	77
17	Jorien ter Mors	(Netherlands)	—	—	70	—	—	—	70
18	Ayano Sato	(Japan)	14	16	24	8	16	—	68
19	Luiza Złotkowska	(Poland)	6	15	16	14	10	—	61
20	Natalia Voronina	(Russia)	16	21	14	—	8	—	59
21	Brianne Tutt	(Canada)	25	8	10	12	—	—	55
22	Isabelle Weidemann	(Canada)	12	12	12	10	—	—	46
23	Gabriele Hirschbichler	(Germany)	0	0	25	18	—	—	43
24	Linda de Vries	(Netherlands)	—	—	19	24	—	—	43
25	Katarzyna Bachleda-Curuś	(Poland)	15	24	—	—	—		41
26	Katarzyna Woźniak	(Poland)	5	0	0	25	6	—	36
27	Nao Kodaira	(Japan)	19	14	—	—	—	—	33
28	Mei Han	(China)	6	0	—	0	25	—	31
29	Nikola Zdráhalová	(Czech Republic)	0	0	8	1	19	—	28
30	Isabell Ost	(Germany)	2	0	2	19	5	—	28
31	Bo-Reum Kim	(South Korea)	—	19	—	6	—	—	25
32	Elizaveta Kazelina	(Russia)	8	8	—	0	8	—	24
33	Francesca Lollobrigida	(Italy)	—	2	15	5	0	—	22
34	Marina Zueva	(Belarus)	—	11	6	0	0	—	17
35	Yuliya Skokova	(Russia)	—	—	11	4	—	—	15
36	Ellen Bjertnes	(Norway)	—	—	1	11	0	—	12
37	Ivanie Blondin	(Canada)	—	—	—	—	11	—	11
38	Vanessa Herzog	(Austria)	—	5	—	6	0	—	11
39	Jing Liu	(China)	10	0	0	0	—	—	10
40	Bente Kraus	(Germany)	—	0	4	—	6	—	10
41	Hege Bøkko	(Norway)	—	—	0	8	—	—	8
42	Jelena Peeters	(Belgium)	1	4	—	—	2	—	7
43	Ji Woo Park	(South Korea)	0	0	6	0	—	—	6
44	Paige Schwartzburg	(United States)	0	0	0	0	4	—	4
45	Seon-Yeong Noh	(South Korea)	0	0	0	2	—	—	2
46	Saori Toi	(Japan)	—	1	0	—	—	—	1
47	Nana Takagi	(Japan)	—	—	—	0	1	—	1
