= 2013–14 ISU Speed Skating World Cup – World Cup 4 – Women's 1000 metres =

The women's 1000 metres race of the 2013–14 ISU Speed Skating World Cup 4, arranged in Sportforum Hohenschönhausen, in Berlin, Germany, was held on 8 December 2013.

Heather Richardson of the United States won the race, while her compatriot Brittany Bowe came second, and Olga Fatkulina of Russia came third. Antoinette de Jong of the Netherlands won the Division B race.

== Results ==
The race took place on Sunday, 8 December, with Division B scheduled in the morning session, at 10:03, and Division A scheduled in the afternoon session, at 14:32.

=== Division A ===
Rank	Name	Nat.	Pair	Lane	Time	WC points	GWC points
1st place, gold medalist(s)	Heather Richardson	(United States)	9	i	1:14.51	100	10
2nd place, silver medalist(s)	Brittany Bowe	(United States)	9	o	1:15.42	80	8
3rd place, bronze medalist(s)	Olga Fatkulina	(Russia)	8	i	1:15.49	70	7
4	Lotte van Beek	(Netherlands)	8	o	1:15.53	60	6
5	Marrit Leenstra	(Netherlands)	1	o	1:15.85	50	5
6	Lee Sang-hwa	(South Korea)	7	i	1:15.98	45	—
7	Kaylin Irvine	(Canada)	3	i	1:16.07	40	
8	Margot Boer	(Netherlands)	7	o	1:16.11	36	
9	Nao Kodaira	(Japan)	6	i	1:16.24	32	
10	Manon Kamminga	(Netherlands)	5	o	1:16.27	28	
11	Wang Beixing	(China)	5	i	1:16.30	24	
12	Karolína Erbanová	(Czech Republic)	6	o	1:16.55	21	
13	Yekaterina Aydova	(Kazakhstan)	4	i	1:17.22	18	
14	Li Qishi	(China)	2	i	1:17.54	16	
15	Gabriele Hirschbichler	(Germany)	4	o	1:17.63	14	
16	Yuki Matsuda	(Japan)	3	o	1:17.92	12	
17	Maki Tsuji	(Japan)	2	o	1:18.32	10	
18	Ji Jia	(China)	1	i	1:18.43	8	

=== Division B ===
Rank	Name	Nat.	Pair	Lane	Time	WC points
1	Antoinette de Jong	(Netherlands)	2	o	1:18.09	25
2	Miho Takagi	(Japan)	9	i	1:18.85	19
3	Sugar Todd	(United States)	7	i	1:18.91	15
4	Zhao Xin	(China)	8	i	1:19.05	11
5	Lee Bo-ra	(South Korea)	7	o	1:19.06	8
6	Kaitlyn McGregor	(Switzerland)	5	i	1:19.51	6
7	Yevgeniya Dmitriyeva	(Russia)	9	o	1:19.52	4
8	Ahn Jee-min	(South Korea)	6	i	1:19.60	2
9	Rebekah Bradford	(United States)	8	o	1:19.71	1
10	Qi Shuai	(China)	6	o	1:19.83	—
11	Denise Roth	(Germany)	5	o	1:20.31	
12	Erina Kamiya	(Japan)	10	i	1:20.37	
13	Roxanne Dufter	(Germany)	1	o	1:20.40	
14	Elina Risku	(Finland)	3	i	1:20.63	
15	Yvonne Daldossi	(Italy)	3	o	1:20.78	
16	Marsha Hudey	(Canada)	1	i	1:20.93	
17	Johanna Östlund	(Sweden)	4	i	1:21.11	
18	Tatyana Sokirko	(Kazakhstan)	2	i	1:21.33	
19	Tatyana Mikhailova	(Belarus)	4	o	1:21.54	
20	Elli Ochowicz	(United States)	10	o	1:44.62	
