= 2013–14 ISU Speed Skating World Cup – World Cup 4 =

The fourth competition weekend of the 2013–14 ISU Speed Skating World Cup was held in Sportforum Hohenschönhausen in Berlin, Germany, from Friday, 6 December, until Sunday, 8 December 2013.

There were no new world records this weekend, but the Dutch women's team, comprised by Marrit Leenstra, Jorien ter Mors and Ireen Wüst, set a new low-altitude team pursuit record of 2:58.19, as they skated the fastest time recorded on any rink outside Calgary and Salt Lake City.

== Schedule ==
The detailed schedule of events:

Date	Session	Events	Comment
Friday, 6 December	Morning	09:50: 500 m women (1); 10:44: 500 m men (1); 11:38: 3000 m women 12:52: 1500 m men	Division B
Friday, 6 December	Afternoon	14:50: 500 m men (1); 15:15: 500 m women (1); 16:00: 3000 m women 17:04: 1500 m men	Division A
Saturday, 7 December	Morning	09:00: 500 m women (2); 09:54: 1000 m men 10:00: 1500 m women	Division B
Saturday, 7 December	Afternoon	13:00: 500 m women (2); 13:41: 1000 m men 14:29: 1500 m women	Division A
Saturday, 7 December	Afternoon	15:30: Team pursuit men	
Sunday, 8 December	Morning	09:10: 500 m men (2); 10:03: 1000 m women 11:07: 5000 m men	Division B
Sunday, 8 December	Afternoon	13:50: 500 m men (2); 14:32: 1000 m women 15:14: 5000 m men	Division A
Sunday, 8 December	Afternoon	16:48: Team pursuit women	

All times are CET (UTC+1).

== Medal summary ==
=== Men's events ===
Event	Race #	Gold	Time	Silver	Time	Bronze	Time	Report
500 m	1	Michel Mulder; Netherlands	34.80	Mo Tae-bum; South Korea	34.89	Keiichiro Nagashima; Japan	35.01	
500 m	2	Mo Tae-bum; South Korea	34.876	Joji Kato; Japan	34.878	Michel Mulder; Netherlands	34.95	
1000 m		Mo Tae-bum; South Korea	1:09.50	Michel Mulder; Netherlands	1:09.52	Shani Davis; United States	1:09.59	
1500 m		Joey Mantia; United States	1:45.80	Zbigniew Bródka; Poland	1:45.83	Denis Yuskov; Russia	1:46.14	
5000 m		Jorrit Bergsma; Netherlands	6:14.82	Jan Blokhuijsen; Netherlands	6:15.66	Lee Seung-hoon; South Korea	6:16.12	
Team pursuit		Netherlands; Douwe de Vries; Jan Blokhuijsen; Jorrit Bergsma	3:41.46	South Korea; Lee Seung-hoon; Kim Cheol-min; Joo Hyong-jun	3:41.92	Poland; Zbigniew Bródka; Konrad Niedźwiedzki; Jan Szymański	3:43.81	

=== Women's events ===
Event	Race #	Gold	Time	Silver	Time	Bronze	Time	Report
500 m	1	Lee Sang-hwa; South Korea	37.36	Olga Fatkulina; Russia	37.71	Wang Beixing; China	37.79	
500 m	2	Olga Fatkulina; Russia	37.92	Wang Beixing; China	37.96	Heather Richardson; United States	38.00	
1000 m		Heather Richardson; United States	1:14.51	Brittany Bowe; United States	1:15.42	Olga Fatkulina; Russia	1:15.49	
1500 m		Ireen Wüst; Netherlands	1:55.33	Katarzyna Bachleda-Curuś; Poland	1:55.93	Lotte van Beek; Netherlands	1:56.28	
3000 m		Martina Sáblíková; Czech Republic	4:02.25	Claudia Pechstein; Germany	4:02.96	Ireen Wüst; Netherlands	4:03.50	
Team pursuit		Netherlands; Ireen Wüst; Jorien ter Mors; Marrit Leenstra	2:58.19	Poland; Katarzyna Bachleda-Curuś; Luiza Złotkowska; Natalia Czerwonka	3:01.18	South Korea; Noh Seon-yeong; Kim Bo-reum; Yang Shin-young	3:02.04	

== Standings ==
The top ten standings in the contested cups after the weekend. The top five nations in the team pursuit cups.

=== Men's cups ===
500 m

#	Name	Nat.	CAL1	CAL2	SLC1	SLC2	AST1	AST2	BER1	BER2	Total
1	Mo Tae-bum	(South Korea)	80	80	5	70	32	80	80	100	527
2	Michel Mulder	(Netherlands)	60	32	70	60	21	45	100	70	458
3	Keiichiro Nagashima	(Japan)	19	4	16	100	45	100	70	60	414
4	Joji Kato	(Japan)	10	40	100	21	50	60	45	80	406
5	Ronald Mulder	(Netherlands)	100	70	24	80	70	32			376
6	Artyom Kuznetsov	(Russia)	50	14	36	14	100	70	50	32	366
7	Tucker Fredricks	(United States)	25	100	50	8	45	50	36	40	354
8	Jesper Hospes	(Netherlands)	45	45	18	28	36	40	40	50	302
9	Dmitry Lobkov	(Russia)	32	18	28	10	80	36	60	36	300
10	Mitchell Whitmore	(United States)	36	50	60	40	28	14	21	24	273

1000 m

#	Name	Nat.	CAL	SLC	AST	BER	Total
1	Shani Davis	(United States)	100	100	100	70	370
2	Michel Mulder	(Netherlands)	32	50	70	80	232
3	Denis Kuzin	(Kazakhstan)	60	36	45	50	191
4	Mo Tae-bum	(South Korea)	45		28	100	173
5	Kjeld Nuis	(Netherlands)	80	80			160
6	Denny Morrison	(Canada)	24	60	60	5	149
7	Brian Hansen	(United States)	70	70			140
8	Mirko Giacomo Nenzi	(Italy)	19	14	80	24	137
9	Koen Verweij	(Netherlands)	50	32	36		118
10	Håvard Holmefjord Lorentzen	(Netherlands)	2	19	32	60	113

1500 m

#	Name	Nat.	CAL	SLC	AST	BER	Total
1	Shani Davis	(United States)	80	100	50	36	266
2	Koen Verweij	(Netherlands)	100	70	80		250
3	Denis Yuskov	(Russia)	14	60	100	70	244
4	Zbigniew Bródka	(Poland)	36	45	70	80	231
5	Sverre Lunde Pedersen	(Norway)	45	28	60	60	193
6	Konrad Niedźwiedzki	(Poland)	40	32	28	40	140
7	Rhian Ket	(Netherlands)	32	14	45	45	136
8	Joey Mantia	(United States)	6		25	100	131
9	Denis Kuzin	(Kazakhstan)	15	21	40	50	126
10	Kjeld Nuis	(Netherlands)	70	40			110

5000/10000 m

#	Name	Nat.	CAL	SLC	AST	BER	Total
1	Sven Kramer	(Netherlands)	100	100	100		300
2	Jorrit Bergsma	(Netherlands)	80	70		100	250
3	Lee Seung-hoon	(South Korea)	70	40	50	70	230
4	Bart Swings	(Belgium)	25	25	60	60	170
5	Alexis Contin	(France)	27	30	80	25	162
6	Jonathan Kuck	(United States)	32	50	45	35	162
7	Bob de Jong	(Netherlands)	60	80		21	161
8	Patrick Beckert	(Germany)	30	21	70	30	151
9	Sverre Lunde Pedersen	(Norway)	35	45	25	40	145
10	Jan Blokhuijsen	(Netherlands)	45	18		80	143

Team pursuit

#	Country	CAL	SLC	BER	Total
1	Netherlands	100	100	100	300
2	South Korea	70	70	80	220
3	United States	80	80	30	190
4	Norway	45	60	60	165
5	Poland	50	25	70	145

Grand World Cup

#	Name	Nat.	CAL	SLC	AST	BER	Total
1	Shani Davis	(United States)	18	20	15	7	60
2	Michel Mulder	(Netherlands)	6.5	8	7	16.5	38
3	Koen Verweij	(Netherlands)	20	7	8		35
4	Mo Tae-bum	(South Korea)	8	3.5	4	19	34.5
5	Sven Kramer	(Netherlands)	10	10	10		30
6	Jorrit Bergsma	(Netherlands)	8	7		10	25
7	Kjeld Nuis	(Netherlands)	15	8			23
7	Denis Yuskov	(Russia)		6	10	7	23
9	Brian Hansen	(United States)	7	15			22
10	Lee Seung-hoon	(South Korea)	7		5	7	19

=== Women's cups ===
500 m

#	Name	Nat.	CAL1	CAL2	SLC1	SLC2	AST1	AST2	BER1	BER2	Total
1	Lee Sang-hwa	(South Korea)	100	100	100	100	100	100	100		700
2	Olga Fatkulina	(Russia)	45	45	50	70	50	70	80	100	510
3	Heather Richardson	(United States)	50	50	70	80	60	50	60	70	490
4	Jenny Wolf	(Germany)	80	80	60	28	80	80	5	60	473
5	Wang Beixing	(China)	70	70	80	60			70	80	430
6	Nao Kodaira	(Japan)	60	36	40	21	70		50	45	322
7	Margot Boer	(Netherlands)	40	60	45	45			36	36	262
8	Thijsje Oenema	(Netherlands)	10	18	14	16	45	60	45	50	258
9	Brittany Bowe	(United States)	32	28	36	32	28	24	40		220
10	Maki Tsuji	(Japan)	28	24	12	12	32	45	28	28	209

1000 m

#	Name	Nat.	CAL	SLC	AST	BER	Total
1	Heather Richardson	(United States)	100	80	100	100	380
2	Brittany Bowe	(United States)	70	100	80	80	330
3	Olga Fatkulina	(Russia)	50	60	70	70	250
4	Lotte van Beek	(Netherlands)	80	32		60	172
5	Lee Sang-hwa	(South Korea)	60		50	45	155
6	Margot Boer	(Netherlands)	45	50		36	131
7	Nao Kodaira	(Japan)	24	40	28	32	124
8	Ireen Wüst	(Netherlands)	40	70			110
9	Wang Beixing	(China)	36	36		24	96
10	Karolína Erbanová	(Czech Republic)	16	18	40	21	95

1500 m

#	Name	Nat.	CAL	SLC	AST	BER	Total
1	Ireen Wüst	(Netherlands)	80	100		100	280
2	Brittany Bowe	(United States)	19	80	100	45	244
3	Lotte van Beek	(Netherlands)	100	60		70	230
4	Yuliya Skokova	(Russia)	32	50	80	16	178
5	Katarzyna Bachleda-Curuś	(Poland)	24	45	12	80	161
6	Ida Njåtun	(Norway)	45	36	32	36	149
7	Claudia Pechstein	(Germany)	36	24	45	32	137
8	Yekaterina Lobysheva	(Russia)	50	40		40	130
9	Brittany Schussler	(Canada)	8	19	70	24	121
10	Marrit Leenstra	(Netherlands)	60			60	120

3000/5000 m

#	Name	Nat.	CAL	SLC	AST	BER	Total
1	Martina Sáblíková	(Czech Republic)	80	100	100	100	380
2	Claudia Pechstein	(Germany)	100	80	80	80	340
3	Antoinette de Jong	(Netherlands)	60	70		50	180
4	Katarzyna Bachleda-Curuś	(Poland)	35	40	35	60	170
5	Jorien Voorhuis	(Netherlands)	50	60		45	155
6	Ida Njåtun	(Norway)	40	45	30	40	155
7	Ireen Wüst	(Netherlands)	70			70	140
8	Yvonne Nauta	(Netherlands)	45	21	70		136
9	Shiho Ishizawa	(Japan)	27	25	60	16	128
10	Masako Hozumi	(Japan)	23	35	45	25	128

Team pursuit

#	Country	CAL	SLC	BER	Total
1	Netherlands	100	100	100	300
2	Poland	70	45	80	195
3	Canada	60	80	50	190
4	Japan	80	60	40	180
5	South Korea	50	40	70	160

Grand World Cup

#	Name	Nat.	CAL	SLC	AST	BER	Total
1	Heather Richardson	(United States)	15	22.5	15.5	16.5	69.5
2	Brittany Bowe	(United States)	7	18	18	8	51
3	Ireen Wüst	(Netherlands)	15	17		17	49
4	Olga Fatkulina	(Russia)	5	12	13	16	46
4	Lee Sang-hwa	(South Korea)	16	10	15	5	46
6	Martina Sáblíková	(Czech Republic)	15	10	10	10	45
7	Lotte van Beek	(Netherlands)	18	6		13	37
8	Claudia Pechstein	(Germany)	10	8	8	8	34
9	Jenny Wolf	(Germany)	8	3	8	3	22
10	Wang Beixing	(China)	7	7		7.5	21.5
