= 2015 World Single Distance Speed Skating Championships – Women's team pursuit =

Women's team pursuit at the 2015 World Single Distance Speed Skating Championships
- Venue: Thialf, Heerenveen
- Date: 14 February 2015
- Competitors: 32 from 8 nations
- Winning time: 3:01.53

Medalists
gold medal	Ayaka Kikuchi; Miho Takagi; Nana Takagi	Japan
silver medal	Marije Joling; Marrit Leenstra; Ireen Wüst	Netherlands
bronze medal	Olga Graf; Yuliya Skokova; Natalya Voronina	Russia

The Women's team pursuit race of the 2015 World Single Distance Speed Skating Championships was held on 14 February 2015.

== Results ==
The race was started at 17:15.

Rank	Pair	Lane	Country	Time	Diff
1st place, gold medalist(s)	3	i	JPN	3:01.53	
2nd place, silver medalist(s)	4	i	NED	3:01.55	+0.02
3rd place, bronze medalist(s)	2	i	RUS	3:03.19	+1.66
4	1	i	CAN	3:04.11	+2.58
5	1	o	KOR	3:05.84	+3.31
6	3	o	POL	3:06.09	+4.56
7	4	o	GER	3:06.65	+5.12
8	2	o	CHN	3:07.27	+5.74
