= 2016–17 ISU Speed Skating World Cup – Women's 1000 metres =

The 1000 meters distance for women in the 2016–17 ISU Speed Skating World Cup will be contested over 7 races on six occasions, out of a total of World Cup occasions for the season, with the first occasion taking place in Harbin, China, on 11–13 November 2016, and the final occasion taking place in Stavanger, Norway, on 11–12 March 2017.

Heather Bergsma of the United States is crowned as World Cup champion by winning 6 of 7 World Cup races. She did not take part in third round of the World Cup in Astana.

== Top three ==
Position	Athlete	Points	Previous season
1	(United States) Heather Bergsma	650	2nd
2	(Japan) Miho Takagi	476	10th
3	(Netherlands) Marrit Leenstra	451	3rd

== Race medallists ==
WC #	Location	Date	Gold	Time	Silver	Time	Bronze	Time	Report
1	Harbin, China	13 November	Heather Bergsma; United States	1:15.94	Marrit Leenstra; Netherlands	1:16.55	Nao Kodaira; Japan	1:16.99	
2	Nagano, Japan	20 November	Heather Bergsma; United States	1:14.81	Nao Kodaira; Japan	1:15.18	Miho Takagi; Japan	1:15.32	
3	Astana, Kazakhstan	3 December	Miho Takagi; Japan	1:15.25	Jorien ter Mors; Netherlands	1:15.36	Marrit Leenstra; Netherlands	1:15.82	
4	Heerenveen, Netherlands	11 December	Heather Bergsma; United States	1:14.60	Marrit Leenstra; Netherlands	1:14.73	Brittany Bowe; United States	1:15.03	
5	Berlin, Germany	27 January	Heather Bergsma; United States	1:15.42	Nao Kodaira; Japan	1:15.49	Jorien ter Mors; Netherlands	1:15.62	
5	Berlin, Germany	29 January	Heather Bergsma; United States	1:15.08	Marrit Leenstra; Netherlands	1:15.45	Karolina Erbanová; Czech Republic	1:15.50	
6	Stavanger, Norway	11 March	Heather Bergsma; United States	1:14.85	Nao Kodaira; Japan	1:14.90	Karolína Erbanová; Czech Republic	1:15.22	

== Standings ==
#	Name	Nat.	HRB	NGN	AST	HVN	BER1	BER2	STA	Total
1	Heather Bergsma	(United States)	100	100	—	100	100	100	150	650
2	Miho Takagi	(Japan)	60	70	100	60	36	60	90	476
3	Marrit Leenstra	(Netherlands)	80	36	70	80	60	80	45	451
4	Nao Kodaira	(Japan)	70	80	—	45	80	—	120	395
5	Karolína Erbanová	(Czech Republic)	—	—	25	18	45	70	104	262
6	Hege Bøkko	(Norway)	36	50	18	16	16	45	76	257
7	Olga Fatkulina	(Russia)	45	32	60	40	32	—	28	237
8	Yekaterina Shikhova	(Russia)	19	21	45	6	50	—	40	181
9	Hong Zhang	(China)	21	60	36	36	—	—	—	153
10	Jorien ter Mors	(Netherlands)	—	—	18	—	70	—	—	150
11	Arisa Go	(Japan)	15	24	50	24	—	—	32	145
12	Ireen Wüst	(Netherlands)	50	45	—	50	—	—	—	145
13	Yekaterina Lobysheva	(Russia)	32	18	32	21	40	—	—	143
14	Gabriele Hirschbichler	(Germany)	12	12	24	32	5	24	21	130
15	Natalia Czerwonka	(Poland)	0	2	—	25	24	40	36	127
16	Vanessa Herzog	(Austria)	8	25	10	14	18	50	—	125
17	Erina Kamiya	(Japan)	1	19	28	10	28	36	—	122
18	Sanneke de Neeling	(Netherlands)	28	10	—	8	6	28	24	104
19	Jing Yu	(China)	18	40	14	28	—	—	—	100
20	Maki Tsuji	(Japan)	24	28	21	12	14	—	—	99
21	Sang-Hwa Lee	(South Korea)	40	—	40	—	—	—	—	80
22	Roxanne Dufter	(Germany)	11	8	6	15	12	21	—	73
23	Brittany Bowe	(United States)	—	—	—	70	—	—	—	70
24	Nadezhda Aseeva	(Russia)	0	0	0	—	32	25	—	57
25	Ida Njåtun	(Norway)	10	16	8	—	21	—	—	55
26	Anice Das	(Netherlands)	16	5	—	19	8	—	—	48
27	Ivanie Blondin	(Canada)	25	—	5	—	10	—	—	40
28	Yekaterina Aydova	(Kazakhstan)	8	14	16	1	—	—	—	39
29	Nan Sun	(China)	—	—	—	—	12	19	—	31
30	Kaylin Irvine	(Canada)	4	15	12	0	—	—	—	31
31	Seung-Hi Park	(South Korea)	0	11	19	—	—	—	—	30
32	Isabell Ost	(Germany)	0	0	2	4	16	6	—	28
33	Martina Sáblíková	(Czech Republic)	14	6	—	—	8	—	—	28
34	Letitia de Jong	(Netherlands)	—	—	—	—	—	25	—	25
35	Jerica Tandiman	(United States)	—	—	—	—	10	15	—	25
36	Elizaveta Kazelina	(Russia)	6	—	8	0	11	—	—	25
37	Bo van der Werff	(Netherlands)	0	6	6	11	1	0	—	24
38	Kelly Gunther	(United States)	5	1	11	6	—	—	—	23
39	Marsha Hudey	(Canada)	—	—	15	5	—	—	—	20
40	Judith Dannhauer	(Germany)	—	—	—	—	—	19		19
41	Paige Schwartzburg	(Netherlands)	0	0	—	0	0	18	—	18
42	Kim Min-Ji	(South Korea)	—	—	—	—	0	15	—	15
43	Francesca Bettrone	(Italy)	0	0	—	—	0	14	—	14
44	Xue Zhan	(China)	0	8	0	0	0	6	—	14
45	Ellen Bjertnes	(Norway)	—	—	4	8	—	—	—	12
46	Tatsiana Mikhailava	(Belarus)	0	0	0	0	0	11	—	11
47	Martine Ripsrud	(Norway)	—	—	—	0	0	8	—	8
48	Ruining Tian	(China)	—	—	—	—	0	8	—	8
49	Qishi Li	(China)	6	—	—	—	—	—	—	6
50	Huawei Li	(Russia)	—	—	—	—	0	6	—	6
51	Min Sun Kim	(South Korea)	0	4	0	0	—	—	—	4
52	Luiza Zlotkowska	(United States)	—	—	—	—	4	—	—	4
53	Rikke Jeppsson	(Norway)	—	—	—	—	0	4	—	4
54	Nikola Zdráhalová	(Czech Republic)	0	0	1	—	2	—	—	3
55	Heather McLean	(Canada)	—	—	0	2	—	—	—	2
56	Béatrice Lamarche	(Canada)	2	0	—	—	—	—	—	2
57	Alexandra Ianculescu	(Romania)	0	0	—	0	0	2	—	2
58	Min-Jo Kim	(South Korea)	—	—	—	—	0	1	—	1
