= 2016 World Single Distances Speed Skating Championships – Women's team pursuit =

Women's team pursuit at the 2016 World Single Distances Speed Skating Championships
- Venue: Kolomna Speed Skating Center, Kolomna
- Date: 13 February
- Competitors: 24 from 8 nations
- Teams: 8
- Winning time: 2:58.12

Medalists
gold medal	Antoinette de Jong; Marrit Leenstra; Ireen Wüst	Netherlands
silver medal	Misaki Oshigiri; Miho Takagi; Nana Takagi	Japan
bronze medal	Olga Graf; Elizaveta Kazelina; Natalya Voronina	Russia

The Women's team pursuit race of the 2016 World Single Distances Speed Skating Championships was held on 13 February 2016.

== Results ==
The race was started at 19:30.

Rank	Pair	Lane	Country	Time	Diff
1st place, gold medalist(s)	4	f	NED	2:58.12	
2nd place, silver medalist(s)	3	f	JPN	2:58.31	+0.19
3rd place, bronze medalist(s)	3	c	RUS	3:02.61	+4.49
4	2	c	GER	3:02.94	+4.82
5	4	c	POL	3:03.77	+5.65
6	1	c	CAN	3:04.94	+6.82
7	2	f	CZE	3:05.44	+7.32
8	1	f	CHN	3:05.69	+7.57
