= 2018 European Speed Skating Championships – Women's team pursuit =

Women's team pursuit at the 2018 European Speed Skating Championships
- Venue: Kolomna Speed Skating Center
- Location: Kolomna, Russia
- Dates: 7 January
- Competitors: 15 from 5 nations
- Teams: 5
- Winning time: 2:59.34

Medalists
gold medal	Lotte van Beek; Marrit Leenstra; Melissa Wijfje	Netherlands
silver medal	Olga Graf; Yekaterina Shikhova; Natalia Voronina	Russia
bronze medal	Roxanne Dufter; Gabriele Hirschbichler; Michelle Uhrig	Germany

The women's team pursuit competition at the 2018 European Speed Skating Championships was held on 7 January 2018.

== Results ==
The race was started at 16:00.

Rank	Pair	Lane	Country	Time	Diff
1st place, gold medalist(s)	3	c	Netherlands; Lotte van Beek; Marrit Leenstra; Melissa Wijfje	2:59.34	
2nd place, silver medalist(s)	2	c	Russia; Olga Graf; Yekaterina Shikhova; Natalia Voronina	3:01.88	+2.54
3rd place, bronze medalist(s)	3	s	Germany; Roxanne Dufter; Gabriele Hirschbichler; Michelle Uhrig	3:05.03	+5.69
4	2	s	Poland; Katarzyna Bachleda-Curuś; Natalia Czerwonka; Katarzyna Woźniak	3:05.06	+5.72
5	1	s	Czech Republic; Eliška Dřímalová; Natálie Kerschbaummayr; Nikola Zdráhalová	3:19.72	+20.38
