= 2013–14 ISU Speed Skating World Cup – World Cup 4 – Men's 1500 metres =

The men's 1500 metres race of the 2013–14 ISU Speed Skating World Cup 4, arranged in Sportforum Hohenschönhausen, in Berlin, Germany, was held on 6 December 2013.

Joey Mantia of the United States won, while Zbigniew Bródka of Poland came second, and Denis Yuskov of Russia came third. Jan Szymański of Poland won the Division B race.

== Results ==
The race took place on Friday, 6 December, with Division B scheduled in the morning session, at 12:52, and Division A scheduled in the afternoon session, at 17:04.

=== Division A ===
Rank	Name	Nat.	Pair	Lane	Time	WC points	GWC points
1st place, gold medalist(s)	Joey Mantia	(United States)	4	o	1:45.80	100	10
2nd place, silver medalist(s)	Zbigniew Bródka	(Poland)	9	i	1:45.83	80	8
3rd place, bronze medalist(s)	Denis Yuskov	(Russia)	10	o	1:46.14	70	7
4	Sverre Lunde Pedersen	(Norway)	9	o	1:46.37	60	6
5	Denis Kuzin	(Kazakhstan)	6	i	1:46.43	50	5
6	Rhian Ket	(Netherlands)	7	i	1:46.44	45	—
7	Konrad Niedźwiedzki	(Poland)	8	o	1:46.67	40	
8	Shani Davis	(United States)	10	i	1:46.74	36	
9	Håvard Bøkko	(Norway)	7	o	1:47.00	32	
10	Mark Tuitert	(Netherlands)	2	i	1:47.24	28	
11	Trevor Marsicano	(United States)	6	o	1:47.28	24	
12	Bart Swings	(Belgium)	1	o	1:47.38	21	
13	Ivan Skobrev	(Russia)	5	i	1:47.41	18	
14	Yevgeny Lalenkov	(Russia)	1	i	1:47.49	16	
15	Håvard Holmefjord Lorentzen	(Norway)	4	i	1:47.64	14	
16	Haralds Silovs	(Latvia)	5	o	1:47.67	12	
17	Benjamin Macé	(France)	3	i	1:47.92	10	
18	Lucas Makowsky	(Canada)	2	o	1:48.19	8	
19	Jonathan Kuck	(United States)	3	o	1:48.55	6	
20	Alexis Contin	(France)	8	i	1:48.77	5	

=== Division B ===
Rank	Name	Nat.	Pair	Lane	Time	WC points
1	Jan Szymański	(Poland)	12	i	1:46.84	25
2	Jan Blokhuijsen	(Netherlands)	2	i	1:47.01	19
3	Thomas Krol	(Netherlands)	2	o	1:47.21	15
4	Wouter olde Heuvel	(Netherlands)	12	o	1:47.25	11
5	Bram Smallenbroek	(Austria)	7	i	1:47.90	8
6	Mathieu Giroux	(Canada)	10	o	1:48.00	6
7	Sergey Gryaztsov	(Russia)	10	i	1:48.29	4
8	Moritz Geisreiter	(Germany)	4	i	1:48.45	2
9	Joo Hyong-jun	(South Korea)	11	i	1:48.47	1
10	Tian Guojun	(China)	11	o	1:48.59	—
11	Fyodor Mezentsev	(Kazakhstan)	9	i	1:48.67	
12	Konrád Nagy	(Hungary)	8	i	1:49.01	
13	Taro Kondo	(Japan)	8	o	1:49.45	
14	Shota Nakamura	(Japan)	6	i	1:49.53	
15	Simen Spieler Nilsen	(Norway)	7	o	1:49.69	
16	Vitaly Mikhailov	(Belarus)	5	o	1:49.74	
17	Kim Cheol-min	(South Korea)	9	o	1:50.23	
18	Philip Steinert	(Germany)	1	o	1:50.45	
19	Maksim Baklashkin	(Kazakhstan)	3	o	1:50.58	
20	Jan Daldossi	(Italy)	6	o	1:50.72	
21	Espen Tveit	(Norway)	1	i	1:51.43	
22	Ewen Fernandez	(France)	5	i	1:52.53	
23	Darren Ta-Yuan Huang	(Chinese Taipei)	4	o	1:53.43	
24	Kalon Dobbin	(New Zealand)	3	i	1:54.29	
