= 2013–14 ISU Speed Skating World Cup – World Cup 4 – Men's 500 metres =

The men's 500 metres races of the 2013–14 ISU Speed Skating World Cup 4, arranged in Sportforum Hohenschönhausen, in Berlin, Germany, were held on 6 and 8 December 2013.

Michel Mulder of the Netherlands won race one, while Mo Tae-bum of South Korea came second, and Keiichiro Nagashima of Japan came third. William Dutton of Canada won the Division B race.

In race two Mo advanced to the top of the podium, while Joji Kato of Japan took the silver medal, and race one winner Mulder took the bronze. Espen Aarnes Hvammen of Norway won the second Division B race.

== Race 1 ==
Race one took place on Friday, 6 December, with Division B scheduled in the morning session, at 10:44, and Division A scheduled in the afternoon session, at 14:50.

=== Division A ===
Rank	Name	Nat.	Pair	Lane	Time	WC points	GWC points
1st place, gold medalist(s)	Michel Mulder	(Netherlands)	10	o	34.80	100	5
2nd place, silver medalist(s)	Mo Tae-bum	(South Korea)	10	i	34.89	80	4
3rd place, bronze medalist(s)	Keiichiro Nagashima	(Japan)	9	i	35.01	70	3.5
4	Dmitry Lobkov	(Russia)	6	i	35.02	60	3
5	Artyom Kuznetsov	(Russia)	9	o	35.03	50	2.5
6	Joji Kato	(Japan)	8	i	35.05	45	—
7	Jesper Hospes	(Netherlands)	7	o	35.13	40	
8	Tucker Fredricks	(United States)	8	o	35.17	36	
9	Daniel Greig	(Australia)	4	o	35.26	32	
10	Yūya Oikawa	(Japan)	6	o	35.31	28	
11	Ryohei Haga	(Japan)	5	i	35.34	24	
12	Mitchell Whitmore	(United States)	7	i	35.36	21	
13	Nico Ihle	(Germany)	2	o	35.39	18	
14	Pekka Koskela	(Finland)	3	i	35.42	16	
15	Mirko Giacomo Nenzi	(Italy)	2	i	35.43	14	
16	Sung Ching-Yang	(Chinese Taipei)	3	o	35.48	12	
17	Mika Poutala	(Finland)	5	o	35.54	10	
18	Kim Jun-ho	(South Korea)	1	o	35.56	8	
19	Lee Kang-seok	(South Korea)	4	i	35.63	6	
20	Roman Krech	(Kazakhstan)	1	i	35.66	5	

=== Division B ===
Rank	Name	Nat.	Pair	Lane	Time	WC points
1	William Dutton	(Canada)	13	i	35.47	25
2	Artur Waś	(Poland)	12	o	35.55	19
3	Aleksey Yesin	(Russia)	14	o	35.663	15
4	Hein Otterspeer	(Netherlands)	3	i	35.665	11
5	Jonathan Garcia	(United States)	10	i	35.70	8
6	Denis Koval	(Russia)	14	i	35.71	6
7	Akio Ohta	(Japan)	13	o	35.794	4
8	Mu Zhongsheng	(China)	10	o	35.795	2
9	Denny Ihle	(Germany)	12	i	35.81	1
10	Espen Aarnes Hvammen	(Norway)	11	i	35.90	—
11	Joey Mantia	(United States)	7	i	35.99	
12	Lee Kyou-hyuk	(South Korea)	9	i	36.00	
13	David Bosa	(Italy)	8	o	36.01	
14	Artur Nogal	(Poland)	11	o	36.02	
15	Kim Tae-yun	(South Korea)	9	o	36.03	
16	Igor Bogolubsky	(Russia)	8	i	36.05	
17	Lennart Velema	(Netherlands)	2	i	36.07	
18	Li Xuefeng	(China)	4	i	36.25	
19	Markus Puolakka	(Finland)	5	i	36.301	
20	Maciej Biega	(Poland)	6	o	36.308	
21	Sebastian Richter	(Germany)	2	o	36.38	
22	Marius Christian Paraschivoiu	(Romania)	5	o	36.422	
23	Benjamin Macé	(France)	7	o	36.427	
24	Mark Tuitert	(Netherlands)	3	o	36.46	
25	Yevgeny Kazimirenko	(Belarus)	1	i	36.65	
26	Denis Dressel	(Germany)	6	i	36.89	
27	Espen Tveit	(Norway)	1	o	37.01	
28	Denny Morrison	(Canada)	4	o	DNS	

== Race 2 ==
Race two took place on Sunday, 8 December, with Division B scheduled in the morning session, at 09:10, and Division A scheduled in the afternoon session, at 13:50.

=== Division A ===
Rank	Name	Nat.	Pair	Lane	Time	WC points	GWC points
1st place, gold medalist(s)	Mo Tae-bum	(South Korea)	10	o	34.876	100	5
2nd place, silver medalist(s)	Joji Kato	(Japan)	7	o	34.878	80	4
3rd place, bronze medalist(s)	Michel Mulder	(Netherlands)	10	i	34.95	70	3.5
4	Keiichiro Nagashima	(Japan)	9	o	35.01	60	3
5	Jesper Hospes	(Netherlands)	8	i	35.04	50	2.5
6	Pekka Koskela	(Finland)	4	o	35.15	45	—
7	Tucker Fredricks	(United States)	7	i	35.18	40	
8	Dmitry Lobkov	(Russia)	8	o	35.22	36	
9	Artyom Kuznetsov	(Russia)	9	i	35.23	32	
10	Nico Ihle	(Germany)	4	i	35.24	28	
11	Mitchell Whitmore	(United States)	5	o	35.24	24	
12	Ryohei Haga	(Japan)	6	o	35.32	21	
13	Mirko Giacomo Nenzi	(Italy)	3	o	35.37	18	
14	Mika Poutala	(Finland)	2	i	35.51	16	
15	Kim Jun-ho	(South Korea)	1	i	35.58	14	
16	Daniel Greig	(Australia)	6	i	35.64	12	
17	Sung Ching-Yang	(Chinese Taipei)	3	i	35.70	10	
18	Roman Krech	(Kazakhstan)	1	o	35.71	8	
19	Yūya Oikawa	(Japan)	5	i	35.81	6	
20	William Dutton	(Canada)	2	o	35.83	5	

=== Division B ===
Rank	Name	Nat.	Pair	Lane	Time	WC points
1	Espen Aarnes Hvammen	(Norway)	8	o	35.53	25
2	Aleksey Yesin	(Russia)	11	i	35.56	19
3	Denis Koval	(Russia)	10	o	35.64	15
4	Hein Otterspeer	(Netherlands)	12	o	35.65	11
5	Denny Ihle	(Germany)	9	o	35.74	8
6	Akio Ohta	(Japan)	10	i	35.78	6
7	Artur Waś	(Poland)	12	i	35.87	4
8	Mu Zhongsheng	(China)	9	i	35.91	2
9	Artur Nogal	(Poland)	7	i	35.93	1
10	Jonathan Garcia	(United States)	11	o	36.04	—
11	Igor Bogolubsky	(Russia)	5	o	36.10	
12	Kim Tae-yun	(South Korea)	6	i	36.23	
13	Lennart Velema	(Netherlands)	4	o	36.27	
14	Joey Mantia	(United States)	7	o	36.35	
15	Denis Dressel	(Germany)	6	o	36.41	
16	David Bosa	(Italy)	8	i	36.42	
17	Maciej Biega	(Poland)	5	i	36.45	
18	Mark Tuitert	(Netherlands)	2	i	36.570	
19	Sebastian Richter	(Germany)	4	i	36.578	
20	Li Xuefeng	(China)	3	o	36.69	
21	Yevgeny Kazimirenko	(Belarus)	1	o	36.73	
22	Håvard Holmefjord Lorentzen	(Norway)	1	i	36.77	
23	Marius Christian Paraschivoiu	(Romania)	3	i	36.88	
24	Markus Puolakka	(Finland)	2	o	DNF	
25	Lee Kyou-hyuk	(South Korea)			WDR	
