= 2011 Asian Speed Skating Championships =

Speed skating competition in Harbin, China

Asian Speed Skating Championships
- Venue: Heilongjiang Indoor Rink (Harbin, China)
- Dates: 28 and 29 December 2010
- Competitors: 17 from 4 nations

Medalist men
1st place, gold medalist(s)		Lee Seung-hoon	KOR
2nd place, silver medalist(s)		Dmitry Babenko	KAZ
3rd place, bronze medalist(s)		Ko Byeong-wook	KOR

Medalist women
1st place, gold medalist(s)		Eriko Ishino	JPN
2nd place, silver medalist(s)		Masako Hozumi	JPN
3rd place, bronze medalist(s)		Ayaka Kikuchi	JPN

The 2011 Asian Speed Skating Championships were held between 28 and 29 December 2010 at the Heilongjiang Indoor Rink in Harbin, China. The championships doubled as qualifier for the 2011 World Championships.

== Women championships ==
=== Day 1 ===
==== 500 meter ====
Place	Athlete	Country	Time
1st place, gold medalist(s)	Dong Feifei	China	40.93
2nd place, silver medalist(s)	Ayaka Kikuchi	Japan	41.15
3rd place, bronze medalist(s)	Jia Ji	China	41.29
4	Lee Ju-yeon	South Korea	41.54
5	Fu Chunyan	China	41.70
6	Eriko Ishino	Japan	41.96
7	Masako Hozumi	Japan	42.29
8	Park Do-yeong	South Korea	42.47

==== 3000 meter ====
Place	Athlete	Country	Time
1st place, gold medalist(s)	Masako Hozumi	Japan	4:15.42
2nd place, silver medalist(s)	Eriko Ishino	Japan	4:17.64
3rd place, bronze medalist(s)	Ayaka Kikuchi	Japan	4:22.34
4	Jia Ji	China	4:25.39
5	Park Do-yeong	South Korea	4:26.59
6	Lee Ju-yeon	South Korea	4:27.12
7	Dong Feifei	China	4:28.79
8	Fu Chunyan	China	5:54.21

=== Day 2 ===
==== 1500 meter ====
Place	Athlete	Country	Time
1st place, gold medalist(s)	Eriko Ishino	Japan	2:02.92
2nd place, silver medalist(s)	Masako Hozumi	Japan	2:03.59
3rd place, bronze medalist(s)	Dong Feifei	China	2:05.68
4	Jia Ji	China	2:05.73
5	Ayaka Kikuchi	Japan	2:06.39
6	Lee Ju-yeon	South Korea	2:06.81
7	Fu Chunyan	China	2:08.92
8	Park Do-yeong	South Korea	2:11.80

==== 5000 meter ====
Place	Athlete	Country	Time
1st place, gold medalist(s)	Masako Hozumi	Japan	7:16.32
2nd place, silver medalist(s)	Eriko Ishino	Japan	7:16.51
3rd place, bronze medalist(s)	Ayaka Kikuchi	Japan	7:36.90
4	Jia Ji	China	7:38.07
5	Fu Chunyan	China	7:47.75
6	Dong Feifei	China	7:48.50

=== Allround results ===
Place	Athlete	Country	500 m	3000 m	1500 m	5000 m	Points
1st place, gold medalist(s)	Eriko Ishino	Japan	41.96 (6)	4:17.64 (2)	2:02.92 (1)	7:16.51 (2)	169.524
2nd place, silver medalist(s)	Masako Hozumi	Japan	42.29 (7)	4:15.41 (1)	2:03.59 (2)	7:16.32 (1)	169.688
3rd place, bronze medalist(s)	Ayaka Kikuchi	Japan	41.15 (2)	4:22.34 (3)	2:06.39 (5)	7:36.90 (3)	172.693
4	Jia Ji	China	41.29 (3)	4:25.39 (4)	2:05.73 (4)	7:38.07 (4)	173.238
5	Dong Feifei	China	40.93 (1)	4:28.79 (7)	2:05.68 (3)	7:48.50 (6)	174.471
6	Fu Chunyan	China	41.70 (5)	5:54.21 (8)	2:08.92 (7)	7:47.75 (5)	190.483
	Lee Ju-yeon	South Korea	41.54 (4)	4:27.12 (6)	2:06.81 (6)		128.330
	Park Do-yeong	South Korea	42.47 (8)	4:26.59 (5)	2:11.80 (8)		130.834

== Men championships ==
=== Day 1 ===
==== 500 meter ====
Place	Athlete	Country	Time
1st place, gold medalist(s)	Gao Xuefeng	China	37.48
2nd place, silver medalist(s)	Lee Seung-hoon	South Korea	37.65
3rd place, bronze medalist(s)	Sun Longjiang	China	37.73
4	Dmitry Babenko	Kazakhstan	37.80
4	Shota Nakamura	Japan	37.80
6	Jin Xin	China	37.89
7	Daiki Wakabayashi	Japan	38.29
8	Ko Byeong-wook	South Korea	38.43
9	Artyom Belousov	Kazakhstan	39.83

==== 5000 meter ====
Place	Athlete	Country	Time
1st place, gold medalist(s)	Lee Seung-hoon	South Korea	6:31.32
2nd place, silver medalist(s)	Ko Byeong-wook	South Korea	6:41.49
3rd place, bronze medalist(s)	Artyom Belousov	Kazakhstan	6:43.83
4	Daiki Wakabayashi	Japan	6:49.39
5	Dmitry Babenko	Kazakhstan	6:51.82
6	Shota Nakamura	Japan	6:53.44
7	Gao Xuefeng	China	6:59.07
8	Sun Longjiang	China	7:00.98
9	Jin Xin	China	7:28.45

=== Day 2 ===
==== 1500 meter ====
Place	Athlete	Country	Time
1st place, gold medalist(s)	Lee Seung-hoon	South Korea	1:50.80
2nd place, silver medalist(s)	Dmitry Babenko	Kazakhstan	1:51.50
3rd place, bronze medalist(s)	Ko Byeong-wook	South Korea	1:53.17
4	Gao Xuefeng	China	1:53.33
5	Shota Nakamura	Japan	1:54.57
6	Artyom Belousov	Kazakhstan	1:55.01
7	Sun Longjiang	China	1:55.83
8	Jin Xin	China	1:56.56
9	Daiki Wakabayashi	Japan	2:46.77

==== 10000 meter ====
Place	Athlete	Country	Time
1st place, gold medalist(s)	Lee Seung-hoon	South Korea	13:38.22
2nd place, silver medalist(s)	Dmitry Babenko	Kazakhstan	13:47.16
3rd place, bronze medalist(s)	Artyom Belousov	Kazakhstan	14:03.91
4	Ko Byeong-wook	South Korea	14:05.42
5	Daiki Wakabayashi	Japan	14:13.66
6	Shota Nakamura	Japan	14:13.72
7	Sun Longjiang	China	14:53.89
8	Gao Xuefeng	China	15:12.59

=== Allround results ===
Place	Athlete	Country	500 m	5000 m	1500 m	10000 m	Points
1st place, gold medalist(s)	Lee Seung-hoon	South Korea	37.65 (2)	6:31.32 (1)	1:50.80 (1)	13:38.22 (1)	154.626
2nd place, silver medalist(s)	Dmitry Babenko	Kazakhstan	37.80 (4)	6:51.83 (5)	1:51.50 (2)	13:47.16 (2)	157.506
3rd place, bronze medalist(s)	Ko Byeong-wook	South Korea	38.43 (8)	6:41.49 (2)	1:53.17 (3)	14:05.42 (4)	158.573
4	Shota Nakamura	Japan	37.80 (4)	6:53.44 (6)	1:54.57 (5)	14:13.72 (6)	160.020
5	Artyom Belousov	Kazakhstan	39.83 (9)	6:43.83 (3)	1:55.01 (6)	14:03.91 (3)	160.744
6	Gao Xuefeng	China	37.48 (1)	6:59.07 (7)	1:53.33 (4)	15:12.59 (8)	162.792
7	Sun Longjiang	China	37.73 (3)	7:00.98 (8)	1:55.83 (7)	14:53.89 (7)	163.132
8	Daiki Wakabayashi	Japan	38.29 (7)	6:49.34 (4)	2:46.77 (9)	14:13.66 (5)	177.502
	Jin Xin	China	37.89 (6)	7:28.45 (9)	1:56.56 (8)		121.588

== See also ==
- Speed skating at the 2011 Asian Winter Games
