= 2018 European Speed Skating Championships – Women's 1500 metres =

Women's 1500 metres at the 2018 European Speed Skating Championships
- Venue: Kolomna Speed Skating Center
- Location: Kolomna, Russia
- Dates: 5 January
- Competitors: 23 from 9 nations
- Winning time: 1:55.52

Medalists
gold medal	Lotte van Beek	Netherlands
silver medal	Yekaterina Shikhova	Russia
bronze medal	Marrit Leenstra	Netherlands

The women's 1500 metres competition at the 2018 European Speed Skating Championships was held on 5 January 2018.

== Results ==
The race was started at 17:18.

Rank	Pair	Lane	Name	Country	Time	Diff
1st place, gold medalist(s)	8	o	Lotte van Beek	Netherlands	1:55.52	
2nd place, silver medalist(s)	10	o	Yekaterina Shikhova	Russia	1:56.57	+1.05
3rd place, bronze medalist(s)	10	i	Marrit Leenstra	Netherlands	1:56.58	+1.06
4	9	i	Linda de Vries	Netherlands	1:57.98	+2.46
5	12	i	Gabriele Hirschbichler	Germany	1:58.18	+2.66
6	8	i	Natalia Czerwonka	Poland	1:58.38	+2.86
7	7	o	Nikola Zdráhalová	Czech Republic	1:59.69	+4.17
8	12	o	Roxanne Dufter	Germany	1:59.75	+4.23
9	11	i	Katarzyna Bachleda-Curuś	Poland	1:59.76	+4.24
10	5	o	Francesca Lollobrigida	Italy	1:59.80	+4.28
11	11	o	Yuliya Skokova	Russia	2:00.03	+4.51
12	9	o	Elizaveta Kazelina	Russia	2:00.80	+5.28
13	7	i	Luiza Złotkowska	Poland	2:01.02	+5.50
14	6	i	Michelle Uhrig	Germany	2:01.47	+5.95
15	6	o	Sofie Karoline Haugen	Norway	2:01.52	+6.00
16	5	i	Tatsiana Mikhailava	Belarus	2:02.47	+6.95
17	2	o	Camilla Lund	Norway	2:02.65	+7.13
18	4	i	Francesca Bettrone	Italy	2:02.73	+7.21
19	4	o	Saskia Alusalu	Estonia	2:03.11	+7.59
20	3	i	Anne Gulbrandsen	Norway	2:04.94	+9.42
21	2	i	Natálie Kerschbaummayr	Czech Republic	2:05.83	+10.31
22	3	o	Eliška Dřímalová	Czech Republic	2:07.39	+11.87
23	1	i	Gloria Malfatti	Italy	2:07.82	+12.30
