= 2017 World Single Distances Speed Skating Championships – Women's team pursuit =

Women's team pursuit at the 2017 World Single Distances Speed Skating Championships
- Venue: Gangneung Oval
- Location: Gangneung, South Korea
- Dates: 10 February
- Competitors: 24 from 8 nations
- Teams: 8
- Winning time: 2:55.85

Medalists
| gold medal | Antoinette de Jong; Marrit Leenstra; Ireen Wüst | Netherlands |
| silver medal | Misaki Oshigiri; Miho Takagi; Nana Takagi | Japan |
| bronze medal | Olga Graf; Yekaterina Shikhova; Natalya Voronina | Russia |

The Women's team pursuit competition at the 2017 World Single Distances Speed Skating Championships was held on 10 February 2017.

== Results ==
The race was started at 19:03.

| Rank | Pair | Lane | Country | Time | Diff |
|---|---|---|---|---|---|
| 1st place, gold medalist(s) | 3 | o | Netherlands | 2:55.85 | |
| 2nd place, silver medalist(s) | 3 | i | Japan | 2:56.50 | +0.65 |
| 3rd place, bronze medalist(s) | 4 | o | Russia | 3:00.51 | +4.66 |
| 4 | 4 | i | Germany | 3:02.88 | +7.01 |
| 5 | 1 | i | South Korea | 3:02.95 | +7.10 |
| 6 | 2 | o | United States | 3:04.01 | +8.16 |
| 7 | 2 | i | Poland | 3:04.16 | +8.31 |
| — | 1 | o | Canada | DNF | |
