= Marije Joling =

Dutch female allround speed skater

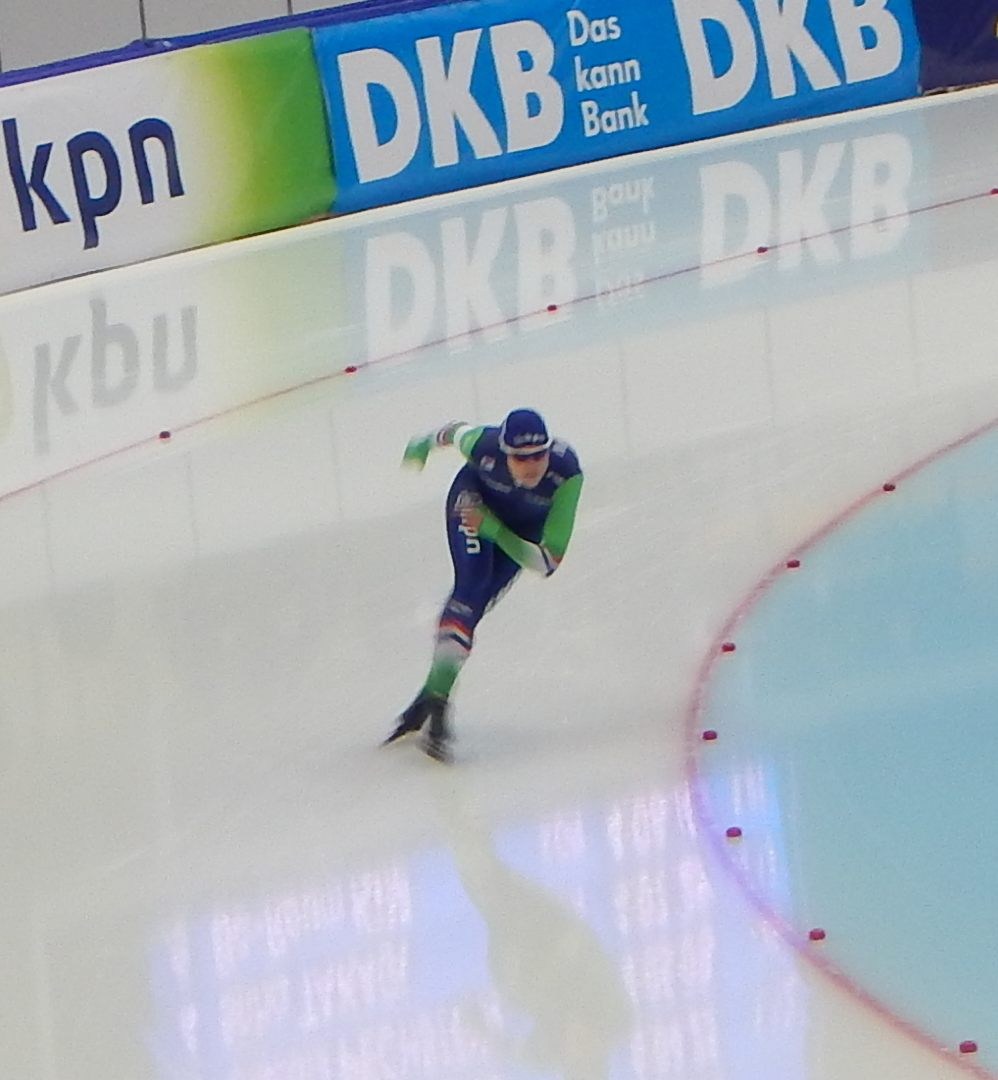
- Joling (2016)

Personal information
- Born: 30 September 1987 (age 39) Assen, Netherlands
- Height: 1.73 m (5 ft 8 in)

Sport
- Country: Netherlands
- Sport: Speed skating
- Turned pro: 2007
Medal record
Women's speed skating
Representing the Netherlands
World Championships
Bronze medal – third place	2015 Heerenveen	3000 m
Silver medal – second place	2015 Heerenveen	Team pursuit

Marije Joling (born 30 September 1987) is a Dutch allround speed skater.

In 2013, Joling won the 5000 m event at the Dutch Single Distance Championships. At the 2015 World Single Distance Speed Skating Championships in Heerenveen she won the bronze medal at the 3000 m event behind Martina Sáblíková and Ireen Wüst. At the same championships she won the silver medal with the Dutch team in the team pursuit event, finishing 0.02s behind the Japanese team.

== Personal bests ==
Personal records
Speed skating
Event	Result	Date	Location	Notes
500 m	39.24	7 March 2015	Olympic Oval, Calgary	
1000 m	1:18.11	3 November 2012	Thialf, Heerenveen	
1500 m	1:54.43	15 November 2015	Olympic Oval, Calgary	
3000 m	4:00.48	13 November 2015	Olympic Oval, Calgary	
5000 m	7:03.19	30 December 2013	Thialf, Heerenveen	
