= Marrit Leenstra (speed skater) =

Dutch former long track speed skater

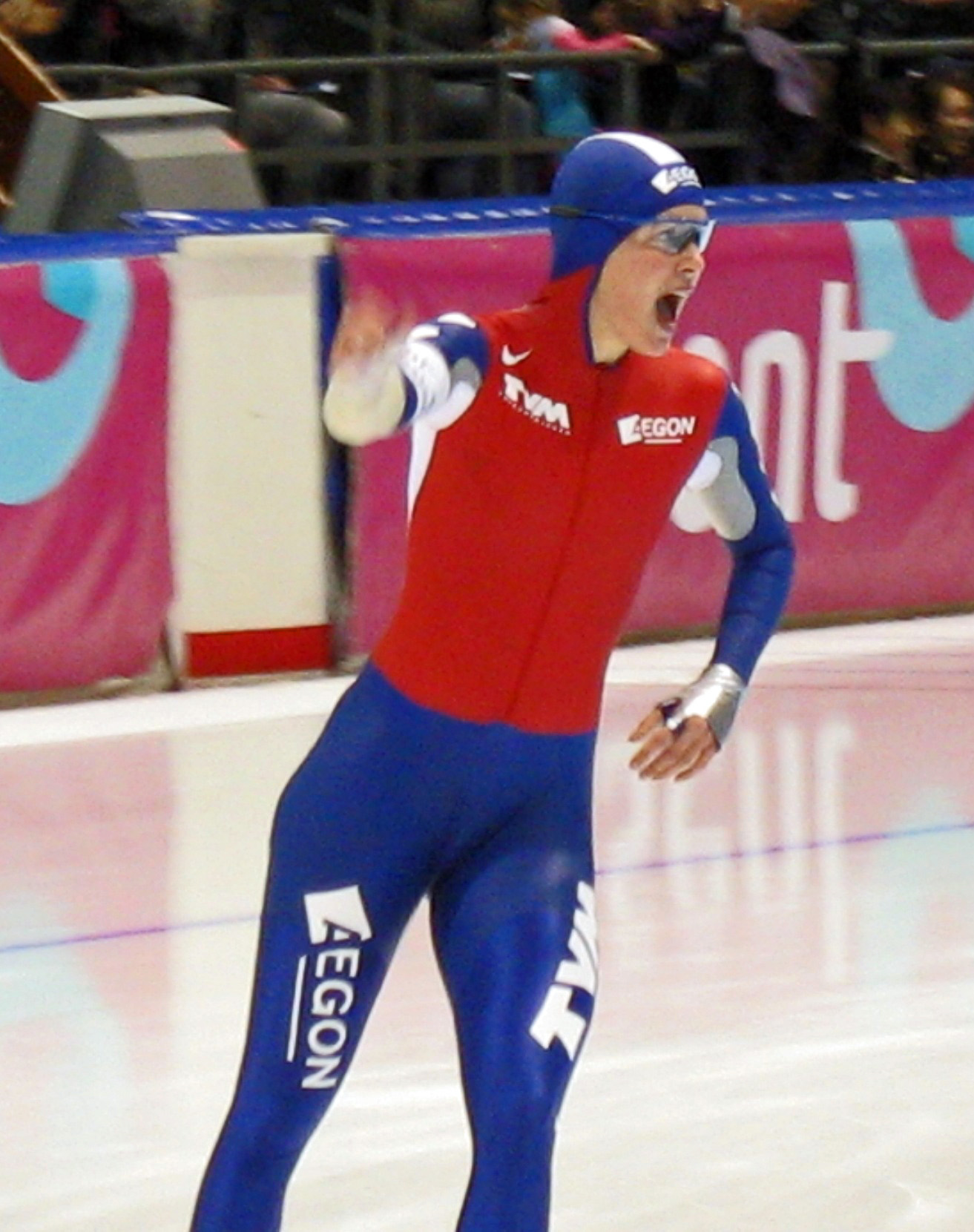
- Marrit Leenstra

Personal information
- Born: 10 May 1989 (age 37) Wijckel, Netherlands
- Height: 1.70 m (5 ft 7 in)
- Weight: 59 kg (130 lb)
- Website: marrit-leenstra.nl

Sport
- Country: Netherlands
- Sport: Speed skating
- Turned pro: 2008
- Retired: 2018

Achievements and titles
- World finals: 1st in 1500 m Overall World Cup (2013, 2015)
Medal record
Olympic Games
| Gold medal – first place | 2014 Sochi | Team pursuit |
| Silver medal – second place | 2018 Pyeongchang | Team pursuit |
| Bronze medal – third place | 2018 Pyeongchang | 1500 m |
World Single Distance Championships
| Gold medal – first place | 2013 Sochi | Team pursuit |
| Gold medal – first place | 2016 Kolomna | Team pursuit |
| Gold medal – first place | 2017 Gangneung | Team pursuit |
| Silver medal – second place | 2011 Inzell | Team pursuit |
| Silver medal – second place | 2015 Heerenveen | Team pursuit |
European Championships
| Gold medal – first place | 2018 Kolomna | Team pursuit |
| Bronze medal – third place | 2011 Collalbo | Allround |
| Bronze medal – third place | 2018 Kolomna | 1000 m |
| Bronze medal – third place | 2018 Kolomna | 1500 m |

Marrit Leenstra (Dutch pronunciation: [ˈmɑrɪt ˈleːnstraː]; born 10 May 1989) is a Dutch former long track speed skater.

== Skating career ==
In the 2007 season she made her World Cup debut in Moscow.

In the 2008 season she skated a junior world record in the 1500 meters at the World Cup in Salt Lake City. Later this season she qualified for the European Championships and ranked 6th after all four distances. With this result she qualified for the World Allround. At the World Allround Championships in Berlin she placed 12th after four distances. In February 2008, Leenstra was crowned the World Junior Speed Skating Champion in Changchun, China. At the end of the season in March 2008 she improved the junior world records on the 1000 and 1500 meters and the mini combination. The latter two are still current junior world records.

In the 2009 season Marrit Leenstra did not qualify for the European Championships, World Sprint Championships or World Allround Championships; however she did qualify for the World Single Distance Championships in the 1500 metres where she finished tenth.

After a disappointing 2010 season, where she failed to qualify for the 2010 Winter Olympics, she had a breakthrough 2011 season. Leenstra won the Dutch Allround Championships and placed third in the European Championships and fourth in the World Allround Championships. Also she placed fourth in the World Single Distances at the 1000 meters, second in the World Single Distances at the team pursuit and second in the World Cup standings for the 1500 meters, including a World Cup win in Salt Lake City.

Leenstra retired from competitive skating in August 2018.

== Personal life ==
Leenstra is married to Italian Olympic gold medalist skater Matteo Anesi.

== Records ==
=== Personal records ===
Personal records
Speed skating
| Event | Result | Date | Location | Notes |
| 500 m | 37.95 | 3 December 2017 | Olympic Oval, Calgary | |
| 1000 m | 1.13.72 | 2 December 2017 | Olympic Oval, Calgary | |
| 1500 m | 1:52.06 | 3 December 2017 | Olympic Oval, Calgary | |
| 3000 m | 4:02.74 | 12 February 2011 | Olympic Oval, Calgary | |
| 5000 m | 7:06.74 | 13 February 2011 | Olympic Oval, Calgary | |
| Sprint allround | 150.465 | 29 January 2012 | Olympic Oval, Calgary | |
| Mini allround | 156.360 | 12–13 March 2008 | Olympic Oval, Calgary | |
| Small allround | 159.620 | 13 February 2012 | Olympic Oval, Calgary | |

=== World records ===
World records
Women's speed skating
| Event | Result | Date | Location | Notes |
| 1500 m jr. | 1:56.47 | 10 November 2007 | Utah Olympic Oval, Salt Lake City | World record for juniors until beaten by herself on 12 March 2008. |
| 1500 m jr. | 1:55.14 | 12 March 2008 | Olympic Oval, Calgary | World record for juniors until beaten by Joy Beune on 9 March 2018. |
| 1000 m jr. | 1:15.41 | 13 March 2008 | Olympic Oval, Calgary | World record for juniors until beaten by Kim Hyun-yung on 10 November 2013. |
| Mini combination jr. | 156.360 | 12–13 March 2008 | Olympic Oval, Calgary | World record for juniors until beaten by Joy Beune on 10 March 2018. |

== Tournament results ==
=== Junior ===
| Season | Category | Dutch Allround | Dutch Sprint | World Allround |
|---|---|---|---|---|
| 2003/04 | Juniors C | 3rd |
| 2004/05 | Juniors B | 5th | 7th |
| 2005/06 | Juniors B | 1st place, gold medalist(s) | 2nd place, silver medalist(s) |
| 2006/07 | Juniors A | 4th | 3rd place, bronze medalist(s) |
| 2007/08 | Juniors A | | 1st place, gold medalist(s) | 1st place, gold medalist(s) |

After the 2008 season, she continued as a senior speed skater.

=== Senior ===
| Season | Dutch Single Distance | Dutch Sprint | Dutch Allround | European Single Distance | European Sprint | European Allround | World Single Distance | World Sprint | World Allround | World Cup | Olympic Games |
|---|---|---|---|---|---|---|---|---|---|---|---|
| 2006/07 | 15th 500 m 9th 1500 m 12th 3000 m | | 13th | —N/a | —N/a | | | | | 50th 1500 m | —N/a |
| 2007/08 | 9th 500 m 4th 1000 m (bronze) 1500 m 10th 3000 m | | 4th | —N/a | —N/a | 6th | | | 12th | 19th 1000 m 23rd 1500 m | —N/a |
| 2008/09 | 17th 500 m 5th 1000 m (bronze) 1500 m 8th 3000 m | 4th | 5th | —N/a | —N/a | | | | | 28th 1000 m 11th 1500 m | —N/a |
| 2009/10 | 15th 1000 m 10th 1500 m 12th 3000 m | 9th | 3rd place, bronze medalist(s) | —N/a | —N/a | | —N/a | | | 41st 1500 m | did not participate |
| 2010/11 | (bronze) 500 m (gold) 1000 m (silver) 1500 m (silver) 3000 m | | 1st place, gold medalist(s) | —N/a | —N/a | 3rd place, bronze medalist(s) | 4th 1000 m (silver) team pursuit | | 4th | 40th 500 m 9th 1000 m (silver) 1500 m 33rd 3000/5000 m | —N/a |
| 2011/12 | (silver) 1000 m (silver) 1500 m 9th 3000 m | 3rd place, bronze medalist(s) | 1st place, gold medalist(s) | —N/a | —N/a | | did not participate | 8th | 13th | (bronze) 1000 m (bronze) 1500 m | —N/a |
| 2012/13 | 5th 500 m (gold) 1000 m (bronze) 1500 m | 1st place, gold medalist(s) | | —N/a | —N/a | | 8th 1000 m (gold) team pursuit | 11th | | 24th 500 m 9th 1000 m (gold) 1500 m | —N/a |
| 2013/14 | 4th 500 m (gold) 1000 m 4th 1500 m | 5th | | —N/a | —N/a | | —N/a | | | 37th 500 m 11th 1000 m 5th 1500 m 12th GWC | 19th 500 m 6th 1000 m 4th 1500 m (gold) team pursuit |
| 2014/15 | (gold) 1000 m (silver) 1500 m 11th 3000m | 4th | DSQ | —N/a | —N/a | | 7th 1000 m 5th 1500 m (silver) team pursuit | | | (silver) 1000 m (gold) 1500 m 5th GWC | —N/a |
| 2015/16 | (bronze) 500 m (silver) 1000 m (bronze) 1500 m 12th 3000m | 2nd place, silver medalist(s) | | —N/a | —N/a | | 7th 1000 m 6th 1500 m (gold) team pursuit | 4th | | 26th 500 m (bronze) 1000 m (bronze) 1500 m 5th GWC | —N/a |
| 2016/17 | 4th 500 m (silver) 1000 m (bronze) 1500 m | | | —N/a | 4th | | 4th 1000 m 4th 1500 m (gold) team pursuit | | | 17th 500 m (bronze) 1000 m (silver) 1500 m 5th GWC | —N/a |
| 2017/18 | (silver) 500 m (silver) 1000 m (bronze) 1500 m | | | (bronze) 1000 m (bronze) 1500 m (gold) team pursuit | —N/a | —N/a | —N/a | 4th | | 20th 500 m (silver) 1000 m (silver) 1500 m (silver) GWC | 6th 1000 m (bronze) 1500 m (silver) team pursuit |

Note: First European Sprint Championship was held in January 2017.
During Olympic seasons World Single Distance Championships are not held.

== World Cup results ==
All results are sourced from the International Skating Union (ISU).

winner 1 ; second 2 ; third 3 ; did not compete (–); did not finish (nf); 5000 m races (*); division B races
| Season | 500 m | | | | | | | | | | | | | | | 1000 m | | | | | | | | | | | 1500 m | | | | | | | | 3000/5000 m | | | | | | | | Team pursuit | | | | | | Team sprint |
|---|---|---|---|---|---|---|---|---|---|---|---|---|---|---|---|---|---|---|---|---|---|---|---|---|---|---|---|---|---|---|---|---|---|---|---|---|---|---|---|---|---|---|---|---|---|---|---|---|---|---|---|---|---|
| Season | 1 | 2 | 3 | 4 | 5 | 6 | 7 | 8 | 9 | 10 | 11 | 12 | 13 | 14 | Points | 1 | 2 | 3 | 4 | 5 | 6 | 7 | 8 | 9 | 10 | Points | 1 | 2 | 3 | 4 | 5 | 6 | 7 | Points | 1 | 2 | 3 | 4 | 5 | 6 | 7 | Points | 1 | 2 | 3 | 4 | 5 | Points | 1 | 2 | 3 | 4 | Points |
| 2006/07 | Heerenveen | Heerenveen | Berlin | Berlin | Harbin | Harbin | Nagano | Nagano | Heerenveen | Heerenveen | Calgary | Calgary | | | —N/a | Heerenveen | Heerenveen | Berlin | Harbin | Harbin | Nagano | Nagano | Heerenveen | Heerenveen | Calgary | —N/a | Heerenveen | Berlin | Moscow | Torino | Erfurt | Calgary | | 6 | Heerenveen | Berlin | Moscow | Torino | Erfurt | Calgary | | —N/a | Berlin | Moscow | Erfurt | | | 240 | —N/a |
| 2006/07 | – | – | – | – | – | – | – | – | – | – | – | – | | | —N/a | – | – | – | – | – | – | – | – | – | – | —N/a | – | – | 6 | – | – | – | | 6 | – | – | –* | – | –* | – | | —N/a | – | – | – | | | 240 | —N/a |
| 2007/08 | Salt Lake City | Salt Lake City | Calgary | Calgary | Heerenveen | Heerenveen | Erfurt | Erfurt | Hamar | Hamar | Inzell | Inzell | Heerenveen | Heerenveen | —N/a | Salt Lake City | Salt Lake City | Calgary | Heerenveen | Erfurt | Erfurt | Hamar | Inzell | Inzell | Heerenveen | 122 | Salt Lake City | Calgary | Kolomna | Heerenveen | Hamar | Baselga di Piné | Heerenveen | 67 | Salt Lake City | Calgary | Kolomna | Heerenveen | Hamar | Baselga di Piné | Heerenveen | —N/a | Calgary | Heerenveen | Baselga di Piné | Heerenveen | | 136 | —N/a |
| 2007/08 | – | – | – | – | – | – | – | – | – | – | – | – | – | – | —N/a | 22 | 19 | 4 | 13 | 7 | 9 | – | – | – | – | 122 | 11 | 20 | 8 | – | – | – | – | 67 | – | – | –* | – | –* | – | – | —N/a | – | – | – | – | | 136 | —N/a |
| 2008/09 | Berlin | Berlin | Heerenveen | Heerenveen | Changchun | Changchun | Nagano | Nagano | Kolomna | Kolomna | Erfurt | Erfurt | Salt Lake City | | —N/a | Berlin | Heerenveen | Changchun | Changchun | Nagano | Nagano | Kolomna | Kolomna | Erfurt | Salt Lake City | 64 | Berlin | Heerenveen | Moscow | Erfurt | Heerenveen | Salt Lake City | | 177 | Berlin | Heerenveen | Moscow | Erfurt | Heerenveen | Salt Lake City | | —N/a | Berlin | Heerenveen | Erfurt | | | 200 | —N/a |
| 2008/09 | – | – | – | – | – | – | – | – | – | – | – | – | – | | —N/a | 6 | – | – | – | – | – | – | – | 2 | – | 64 | 11 | 6 | 13 | 11 | 6 | 12 | | 177 | – | – | –* | – | –* | – | | —N/a | – | 1 | – | | | 200 | —N/a |
| 2009/10 | Berlin | Berlin | Heerenveen | Heerenveen | Calgary | Calgary | Salt Lake City | Salt Lake City | Erfurt | Erfurt | Heerenveen | Heerenveen | | | —N/a | Berlin | Heerenveen | Calgary | Salt Lake City | Erfurt | Erfurt | Heerenveen | | | | 0 | Berlin | Heerenveen | Hamar | Calgary | Salt Lake City | Heerenveen | | 10 | Berlin | Heerenveen | Hamar | Calgary | Salt Lake City | Heerenveen | | —N/a | Heerenveen | Calgary | Salt Lake City | Heerenveen | | 185 | —N/a |
| 2009/10 | – | – | – | – | – | – | – | – | – | – | – | – | | | —N/a | – | – | – | 27 | – | – | – | | | | 0 | – | – | – | 17 | 27 | – | | 10 | – | – | –* | – | – | – | | —N/a | – | – | – | – | | 185 | —N/a |
| 2010/11 | Heerenveen | Heerenveen | Berlin | Berlin | Changchun | Changchun | Obihiro | Obihiro | Moscow | Moscow | Heerenveen | Heerenveen | | | 11 | Heerenveen | Berlin | Changchun | Changchun | Obihiro | Obihiro | Moscow | Heerenveen | | | 250 | Heerenveen | Berlin | Hamar | Moscow | Salt Lake City | Heerenveen | | 466 | Heerenveen | Berlin | Hamar | Moscow | Salt Lake City | Heerenveen | | 25 | Berlin | Hamar | Moscow | | | 300 | —N/a |
| 2010/11 | 20 | 19 | – | – | – | – | – | – | – | – | – | – | | | 11 | 7 | 6 | – | – | – | – | 6 | 2 | | | 250 | 3 | 2 | 4 | 1 | 2 | | | 466 | – | 1 | –* | – | –* | – | | 25 | – | 3 | 1 | | | 300 | —N/a |
| 2011/12 | Chelyabinsk | Chelyabinsk | Astana | Astana | Heerenveen | Heerenveen | Salt Lake City | Salt Lake City | Heerenveen | Heerenveen | Berlin | Berlin | | | —N/a | Chelyabinsk | Astana | Heerenveen | Salt Lake City | Salt Lake City | Heerenveen | Berlin | | | | 420 | Chelyabinsk | Astana | Heerenveen | Hamar | Heerenveen | Berlin | | 401 | Chelyabinsk | Astana | Heerenveen | Hamar | Heerenveen | Berlin | | —N/a | Chelyabinsk | Heerenveen | Hamar | Berlin | | 140 | —N/a |
| 2011/12 | – | – | – | – | – | – | – | – | – | – | – | – | | | —N/a | 3 | 4 | 5 | 6 | 2 | 3 | 6 | | | | 420 | 3 | 7 | 12 | 3 | 2 | 2 | | 401 | – | – | –* | – | –* | – | | —N/a | 2 | nf | – | – | | 140 | —N/a |
| 2012/13 | Heerenveen | Heerenveen | Nagano | Nagano | Harbin | Harbin | Calgary | Calgary | Erfurt | Erfurt | Heerenveen | Heerenveen | | | 89 | Heerenveen | Nagano | Nagano | Harbin | Harbin | Calgary | Calgary | Erfurt | Heerenveen | | 343 | Heerenveen | Chelyabinsk | Astana | Inzell | Erfurt | Heerenveen | | 411 | Heerenveen | Chelyabinsk | Astana | Inzell | Erfurt | Heerenveen | | —N/a | Heerenveen | Astana | Erfurt | Heerenveen | | 400 | —N/a |
| 2012/13 | 15 | 14 | 12 | 14 | – | – | 16 | – | 17 | – | – | – | | | 89 | 4 | 4 | 5 | – | – | 5 | 6 | 4 | 10 | | 343 | 2 | 1 | 2 | 6 | 3 | 8 | | 411 | – | – | –* | – | –* | – | | —N/a | 2 | 3 | 1 | 1 | | 400 | —N/a |
| 2013/14 | Calgary | Calgary | Salt Lake City | Salt Lake City | Astana | Astana | Berlin | Berlin | Inzell | Inzell | Heerenveen | Heerenveen | | | 17 | Calgary | Salt Lake City | Astana | Berlin | Inzell | Heerenveen | | | | | 140 | Calgary | Salt Lake City | Astana | Berlin | Inzell | Heerenveen | | 242 | Calgary | Salt Lake City | Astana | Berlin | Inzell | Heerenveen | | —N/a | Calgary | Salt Lake City | Berlin | Heerenveen | | 450 | —N/a |
| 2013/14 | – | – | – | – | – | – | 6 | 4 | – | – | – | – | | | 17 | – | – | – | 5 | 6 | 6 | | | | | 140 | 4 | – | – | 4 | 9 | 4 | | 242 | – | – | –* | – | – | – | | —N/a | – | – | 1 | 1 | | 450 | —N/a |
| 2014/15 | Obihiro | Obihiro | Seoul | Seoul | Berlin | Berlin | Heerenveen | Heerenveen | Heerenveen | Heerenveen | Erfurt | Erfurt | | | —N/a | Obihiro | Seoul | Berlin | Heerenveen | Heerenveen | Heerenveen | Erfurt | | | | 507 | Obihiro | Seoul | Berlin | Heerenveen | Hamar | Erfurt | | 410 | Obihiro | Seoul | Berlin | Heerenveen | Hamar | Erfurt | | —N/a | Obihiro | Berlin | Heerenveen | | | 350 | —N/a |
| 2014/15 | – | – | – | – | – | – | – | – | – | – | – | – | | | —N/a | 1 | 2 | 4 | 8 | 6 | 2 | 3 | | | | 507 | 2 | 1 | 3 | 3 | – | 4 | | 410 | – | –* | – | – | – | – | | —N/a | 1 | 1 | 1 | | | 350 | —N/a |
| 2015/16 | Calgary | Calgary | Salt Lake City | Salt Lake City | Inzell | Inzell | Heerenveen | Heerenveen | Stavanger | Stavanger | Heerenveen | Heerenveen | | | 70 | Calgary | Salt Lake City | Inzell | Heerenveen | Stavanger | Stavanger | Heerenveen | | | | 465 | Calgary | Salt Lake City | Inzell | Heerenveen | Stavanger | Heerenveen | | 396 | Calgary | Salt Lake City | Inzell | Heerenveen | Stavanger | Heerenveen | | —N/a | Calgary | Inzell | Heerenveen | Heerenveen | | 380 | Calgary | Salt Lake City | Heerenveen | Heerenveen | 314 |
| 2015/16 | – | – | 18 | 2 | 11 | 4 | 5 | 4 | – | – | – | – | | | 70 | 6 | 4 | 5 | 3 | 3 | 2 | 4 | | | | 465 | 5 | 4 | 3 | 3 | 3 | 5 | | 396 | – | –* | – | – | – | – | | —N/a | 1 | 2 | 2 | 2 | | 380 | – | – | – | – | 314 |
| 2016/17 | Harbin | Harbin | Nagano | Astana | Astana | Heerenveen | Berlin | Berlin | Stavanger | Stavanger | | | | | 126 | Harbin | Nagano | Astana | Heerenveen | Berlin | Berlin | Stavanger | | | | 451 | Harbin | Nagano | Astana | Heerenveen | Berlin | Stavanger | | 460 | Harbin | Nagano | Astana | Heerenveen | Berlin | Stavanger | | —N/a | Harbin | Nagano | Astana | Heerenveen | Stavanger | 430 | Nagano | Heerenveen | Stavanger | | 290 |
| 2016/17 | 11 | 10 | 14 | 17 | – | 16 | 8 | – | – | – | | | | | 126 | 2 | 8 | 3 | 2 | 4 | 2 | 6 | | | | 451 | 2 | 3 | 2 | 4 | 2 | 4 | | 460 | – | – | – | –* | – | – | | —N/a | 1 | 1 | 2 | 9 | – | 430 | – | – | 1 | | 290 |
| 2017/18 | Heerenveen | Heerenveen | Stavanger | Stavanger | Calgary | Salt Lake City | Salt Lake City | Erfurt | Erfurt | Minsk | Minsk | | | | 120 | Heerenveen | Stavanger | Calgary | Salt Lake City | Erfurt | Erfurt | Minsk | | | | 420 | Heerenveen | Stavanger | Calgary | Salt Lake City | Erfurt | Minsk | | 390 | Heerenveen | Stavanger | Calgary | Salt Lake City | Erfurt | Minsk | | —N/a | Heerenveen | Calgary | Salt Lake City | Minsk | | 280 | Heerenveen | Stavanger | Calgary | Minsk | 230 |
| 2017/18 | 17 | – | 1 | – | 1 | – | – | – | 4 | – | – | | | | 120 | 4 | 4 | 3 | – | 2 | – | 1 | | | | 420 | 20 | 1 | 2 | 2 | 2 | 2 | | 390 | – | –* | – | – | – | – | | —N/a | – | nf | 2 | 2 | | 280 | – | – | – | 2 | 230 |

Note: Points column in team sprint and team pursuit events represents the point score of Netherlands team, hence results from the World Cup races that Leenstra did not participate are included.

=== World Cup podiums ===
- 18 wins
- 69 podiums

| Season | 500 m | | | 1000 m | | | 1500 m | | | 3000/5000 m | | | Team pursuit | | | Team sprint | | | Total |
|---|---|---|---|---|---|---|---|---|---|---|---|---|---|---|---|---|---|---|---|---|---|
| Season | 1st place, gold medalist(s) | 2nd place, silver medalist(s) | 3rd place, bronze medalist(s) | 1st place, gold medalist(s) | 2nd place, silver medalist(s) | 3rd place, bronze medalist(s) | 1st place, gold medalist(s) | 2nd place, silver medalist(s) | 3rd place, bronze medalist(s) | 1st place, gold medalist(s) | 2nd place, silver medalist(s) | 3rd place, bronze medalist(s) | 1st place, gold medalist(s) | 2nd place, silver medalist(s) | 3rd place, bronze medalist(s) | 1st place, gold medalist(s) | 2nd place, silver medalist(s) | 3rd place, bronze medalist(s) | 1st place, gold medalist(s) | 2nd place, silver medalist(s) | 3rd place, bronze medalist(s) |
| 2008/09 | | | | | | | | | | | | | 1 | | | —N/a | | | 1 |
| 2009/10 | | | | | | | | | | | | | | | | —N/a |
| 2010/11 | | | | | 1 | | 1 | 2 | 1 | | | | 1 | | 1 | —N/a | | | 2 | 3 | 2 |
| 2011/12 | | | | | 1 | 2 | | 2 | 2 | | | | | 1 | | —N/a | | | | 4 | 4 |
| 2012/13 | | | | | | | 1 | 2 | 1 | | | | 2 | 1 | 1 | —N/a | | | 3 | 3 | 2 |
| 2013/14 | | | | | | | | | | | | | 2 | | | —N/a | | | 2 |
| 2014/15 | | | | 1 | 2 | 1 | 1 | 1 | 2 | | | | 3 | | | —N/a | | | 5 | 3 | 3 |
| 2015/16 | | | | | 1 | 2 | | | 3 | | | | 1 | 3 | | | | | 1 | 4 | 5 |
| 2016/17 | | | | | 3 | 1 | | 3 | 1 | | | | 2 | 1 | | 1 | | | 3 | 7 | 2 |
| 2017/18 | | | | 1 | 1 | 1 | | 4 | | | | | | 2 | | | 1 | | 1 | 8 | 1 |
| Total | 0 | 0 | 0 | 2 | 9 | 7 | 3 | 14 | 10 | 0 | 0 | 0 | 12 | 8 | 2 | 1 | 1 | 0 | 18 | 32 | 19 |
| Total | 0 | | | 18 | | | 27 | | | 0 | | | 22 | | | 2 | | | 69 |

=== Individual podiums ===
- 5 wins
- 45 podiums

| No. | Season | Date | Location | Venue | Discipline | Place |
|---|---|---|---|---|---|---|
| 1 | 2010/11 | 4 November 2010 | Heerenveen, Netherlands | Thialf | 1500 m | 3rd |
| 2 | 2010/11 | 28 November 2010 | Hamar, Norway | Vikingskipet | 1500 m | 2nd |
| 3 | 2010/11 | 19 February 2011 | (United States) Salt Lake City, USA | Utah Olympic Oval | 1500 m | 1st |
| 4 | 2010/11 | 4 March 2011 | Heerenveen, Netherlands | Thialf | 1500 m | 2nd |
| 5 | 2010/11 | 6 March 2011 | Heerenveen, Netherlands | Thialf | 1000 m | 2nd |
| 6 | 2011/12 | 19 November 2011 | Chelyabinsk, Russia | Uralskaya Molniya | 1000 m | 3rd |
| 7 | 2011/12 | 20 November 2011 | Chelyabinsk, Russia | Uralskaya Molniya | 1500 m | 3rd |
| 8 | 2011/12 | 22 January 2012 | (United States) Salt Lake City, USA | Utah Olympic Oval | 1000 m | 2nd |
| 9 | 2011/12 | 11 February 2012 | Hamar, Norway | Vikingskipet | 1500 m | 3rd |
| 10 | 2011/12 | 3 March 2012 | Heerenveen, Netherlands | Thialf | 1500 m | 2nd |
| 11 | 2011/12 | 4 March 2012 | Heerenveen, Netherlands | Thialf | 1000 m | 3rd |
| 12 | 2011/12 | 10 March 2012 | Berlin, Germany | Sportforum Hohenschönhausen | 1500 m | 2nd |
| 13 | 2012/13 | 17 November 2012 | Heerenveen, Netherlands | Thialf | 1500 m | 2nd |
| 14 | 2012/13 | 24 November 2012 | Kolomna, Russia | Kolomna Speed Skating Center | 1500 m | 1st |
| 15 | 2012/13 | 2 December 2012 | Astana, Kazakhstan | Alau Ice Palace | 1500 m | 2nd |
| 16 | 2012/13 | 2 March 2013 | Erfurt, Germany | Gunda Niemann-Stirnemann Halle | 1500 m | 3rd |
| 17 | 2014/15 | 15 November 2014 | Obihiro, Japan | Meiji Hokkaido-Tokachi Oval | 1000 m | 1st |
| 18 | 2014/15 | 16 November 2014 | Obihiro, Japan | Meiji Hokkaido-Tokachi Oval | 1500 m | 2nd |
| 19 | 2014/15 | 22 November 2014 | Seoul, South Korea | Taereung International Ice Rink | 1500 m | 1st |
| 20 | 2014/15 | 23 November 2014 | Seoul, South Korea | Taereung International Ice Rink | 1000 m | 2nd |
| 21 | 2014/15 | 7 December 2014 | Berlin, Germany | Sportforum Hohenschönhausen | 1500 m | 3rd |
| 22 | 2014/15 | 14 December 2014 | Heerenveen, Netherlands | Thialf | 1500 m | 3rd |
| 23 | 2014/15 | 8 February 2015 | Heerenveen, Netherlands | Thialf | 1000 m | 2nd |
| 24 | 2014/15 | 22 March 2015 | Erfurt, Germany | Gunda Niemann-Stirnemann Halle | 1000 m | 3rd |
| 25 | 2015/16 | 6 December 2015 | Inzell, Germany | Eisstadion Inzell | 1500 m | 3rd |
| 26 | 2015/16 | 12 December 2015 | Heerenveen, Netherlands | Thialf | 1000 m | 3rd |
| 27 | 2015/16 | 13 December 2015 | Heerenveen, Netherlands | Thialf | 1500 m | 3rd |
| 28 | 2015/16 | 29 January 2016 | Stavanger, Norway | Sørmarka Arena | 1000 m | 3rd |
| 29 | 2015/16 | 30 January 2016 | Stavanger, Norway | Sørmarka Arena | 1500 m | 3rd |
| 30 | 2015/16 | 31 January 2016 | Stavanger, Norway | Sørmarka Arena | 1000 m | 2nd |
| 31 | 2016/17 | 12 November 2016 | Harbin, China | Heilongjiang Indoor Rink | 1000 m | 2nd |
| 32 | 2016/17 | 13 November 2016 | Harbin, China | Heilongjiang Indoor Rink | 1500 m | 2nd |
| 33 | 2016/17 | 20 November 2016 | Nagano, Japan | M-Wave | 1500 m | 3rd |
| 34 | 2016/17 | 3 December 2016 | Astana, Kazakhstan | Alau Ice Palace | 1000 m | 3rd |
| 35 | 2016/17 | 4 December 2016 | Astana, Kazakhstan | Alau Ice Palace | 1500 m | 2nd |
| 36 | 2016/17 | 11 December 2016 | Heerenveen, Netherlands | Thialf | 1000 m | 2nd |
| 37 | 2016/17 | 28 January 2017 | Berlin, Germany | Sportforum Hohenschönhausen | 1500 m | 2nd |
| 38 | 2016/17 | 29 January 2017 | Berlin, Germany | Sportforum Hohenschönhausen | 1000 m | 2nd |
| 39 | 2017/18 | 2 December 2017 | Calgary, Canada | Olympic Oval | 1000 m | 3rd |
| 40 | 2017/18 | 3 December 2017 | Calgary, Canada | Olympic Oval | 1500 m | 2nd |
| 41 | 2017/18 | 9 December 2017 | (United States) Salt Lake City, USA | Utah Olympic Oval | 1500 m | 2nd |
| 42 | 2017/18 | 19 January 2018 | Erfurt, Germany | Gunda Niemann-Stirnemann Halle | 1000 m | 2nd |
| 43 | 2017/18 | 20 January 2018 | Erfurt, Germany | Gunda Niemann-Stirnemann Halle | 1500 m | 2nd |
| 44 | 2017/18 | 17 March 2018 | Minsk, Belarus | Minsk-Arena | 1000 m | 1st |
| 45 | 2017/18 | 18 March 2018 | Minsk, Belarus | Minsk-Arena | 1500 m | 2nd |

=== Team podiums ===
- 13 wins – (12 TP, 1 TS)
- 24 podiums – (22 TP, 2 TS)

| No. | Season | Date | Location | Venue | Discipline | Place |
|---|---|---|---|---|---|---|---|
| 1 | 2008/09 | 16 November 2008 | Heerenveen, Netherlands | Thialf | Team pursuit | 1st | with Ireen Wüst and Renate Groenewold |
| 2 | 2010/11 | 28 November 2010 | Hamar, Norway | Vikingskipet | Team pursuit | 3rd | with Jorien Voorhuis and Marije Joling |
| 3 | 2010/11 | 30 January 2011 | Moscow, Russia | Krylatskoye Skating Hall | Team pursuit | 1st | with Ireen Wüst and Diane Valkenburg |
| 4 | 2011/12 | 20 November 2011 | Chelyabinsk, Russia | Uralskaya Molniya | Team pursuit | 2nd | with Ireen Wüst and Diane Valkenburg |
| 5 | 2012/13 | 18 November 2012 | Heerenveen, Netherlands | Thialf | Team pursuit | 2nd | with Diane Valkenburg and Marije Joling |
| 6 | 2012/13 | 2 December 2012 | Astana, Kazakhstan | Alau Ice Palace | Team pursuit | 3rd | with Diane Valkenburg and Linda de Vries |
| 7 | 2012/13 | 3 March 2013 | Erfurt, Germany | Gunda Niemann-Stirnemann Halle | Team pursuit | 1st | with Ireen Wüst and Diane Valkenburg |
| 8 | 2012/13 | 8 March 2013 | Heerenveen, Netherlands | Thialf | Team pursuit | 1st | with Ireen Wüst and Linda de Vries |
| 9 | 2013/14 | 8 December 2013 | Berlin, Germany | Sportforum Hohenschönhausen | Team pursuit | 1st | with Ireen Wüst and Jorien ter Mors |
| 10 | 2013/14 | 16 March 2014 | Heerenveen, Netherlands | Thialf | Team pursuit | 1st | with Lotte van Beek and Linda de Vries |
| 11 | 2014/15 | 15 November 2014 | Obihiro, Japan | Meiji Hokkaido-Tokachi Oval | Team pursuit | 1st | with Ireen Wüst and Marije Joling |
| 12 | 2014/15 | 6 December 2014 | Berlin, Germany | Sportforum Hohenschönhausen | Team pursuit | 1st | with Ireen Wüst and Marije Joling |
| 13 | 2014/15 | 13 December 2014 | Heerenveen, Netherlands | Thialf | Team pursuit | 1st | with Linda de Vries and Carlijn Achtereekte |
| 14 | 2015/16 | 14 November 2015 | Calgary, Canada | Olympic Oval | Team pursuit | 1st | with Antoinette de Jong and Marije Joling |
| 15 | 2015/16 | 5 December 2015 | Inzell, Germany | Eisstadion Inzell | Team pursuit | 2nd | with Antoinette de Jong and Marije Joling |
| 16 | 2015/16 | 12 December 2015 | Heerenveen, Netherlands | Thialf | Team pursuit | 2nd | with Antoinette de Jong and Linda de Vries |
| 17 | 2015/16 | 12 March 2016 | Heerenveen, Netherlands | Thialf | Team pursuit | 2nd | with Ireen Wüst and Antoinette de Jong |
| 18 | 2016/17 | 12 November 2016 | Harbin, China | Heilongjiang Indoor Rink | Team pursuit | 1st | with Ireen Wüst and Antoinette de Jong |
| 19 | 2016/17 | 19 November 2016 | Nagano, Japan | M-Wave | Team pursuit | 1st | with Antoinette de Jong and Marije Joling |
| 20 | 2016/17 | 3 December 2016 | Astana, Kazakhstan | Alau Ice Palace | Team pursuit | 2nd | with Antoinette de Jong and Linda de Vries |
| 21 | 2016/17 | 13 March 2017 | Stavanger, Norway | Sørmarka Arena | Team sprint | 1st | with Floor van den Brandt and Anice Das |
| 22 | 2017/18 | 8 December 2017 | (United States) Salt Lake City, USA | Utah Olympic Oval | Team pursuit | 2nd | with Melissa Wijfje and Lotte van Beek |
| 23 | 2017/18 | 17 March 2018 | Minsk, Belarus | Minsk-Arena | Team pursuit | 2nd | with Antoinette de Jong and Lotte van Beek |
| 24 | 2017/18 | 18 March 2018 | Minsk, Belarus | Minsk-Arena | Team sprint | 2nd | with Letitia de Jong and Lotte van Beek |
