= 2015 World Single Distance Speed Skating Championships =

World Championship event held in Heerenveen, Netherlands

World Single Distance Speed Skating Championships
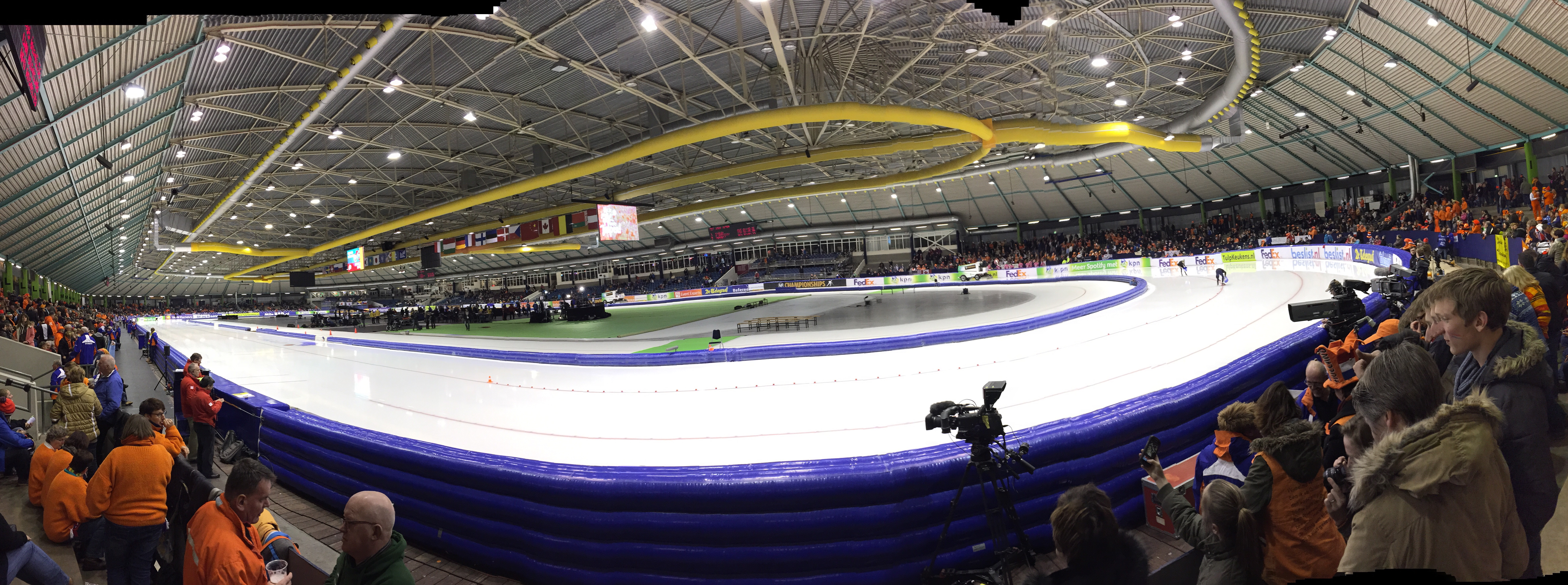
- Thialf during the event
- Venue: Thialf, Heerenveen
- Dates: 12–15 February 2015
- Competitors: 161 from 23 nations

The 2015 World Single Distance Speed Skating Championships was held between 12 and 15 February 2015 in Heerenveen, Netherlands.

== Schedule ==
Date	Time	Events
12 February	18:00	3000 m women
12 February	19:33	10000 m men
13 February	18:00	1000 m women
13 February	18:53	1500 m men
13 February	19:53	5000 m women
13 February	21:29	Team pursuit men
14 February	13:00	5000 m men
14 February	14:57	500 m women
14 February	15:41	1000 m men
14 February	17:24	Team pursuit women
15 February	13:15	500 m men
15 February	14:00	1500 m women
15 February	15:54	Mass start men
15 February	16:19	Mass start women

Source:schaatsen.nl

== Participating nations ==
161 speed skaters from 23 nations participated. The number of speed skaters per nation that competed is shown in parentheses.

Participating nations
Click on a nation to go to the nations' 2015 Championships page
- Austria (3)
- Belarus (2)
- Belgium (2)
- Canada (16)
- China (10)
- Czech Republic (3)
- Denmark (1)
- Estonia (1)
- Finland (2)
- France (2)
- Germany (14)
- Italy (7)
- Japan (13)
- Kazakhstan (2)
- Latvia (1)
- Netherlands (25)
- New Zealand (1)
- Norway (6)
- Poland (10)
- Russia (19)
- South Korea (12)
- Switzerland (1)
- United States (8)

== Medal summary ==
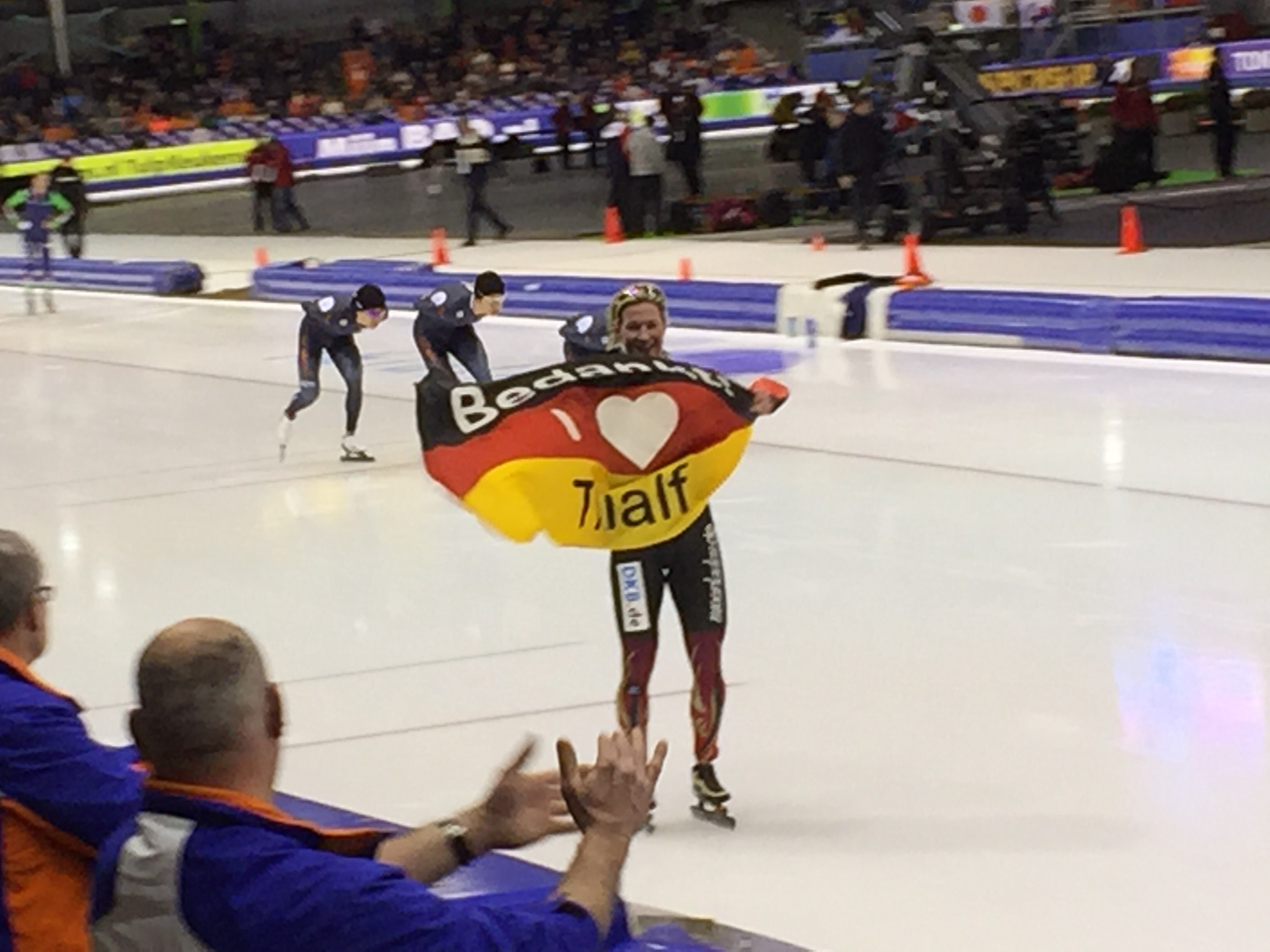
Pechstein thanking Thialf

=== Medal table ===
* Host nation (Netherlands)

Rank	Nation	Gold	Silver	Bronze	Total
1	Netherlands (NED)*	5	7	5	17
2	United States (USA)	4	2	1	7
3	Russia (RUS)	2	1	1	4
4	Czech Republic (CZE)	2	0	1	3
5	Japan (JPN)	1	0	1	2
6	Canada (CAN)	0	3	1	4
7	Italy (ITA)	0	1	0	1
8	Germany (GER)	0	0	2	2
9	France (FRA)	0	0	1	1
9	South Korea (KOR)	0	0	1	1
Totals (10 entries)		14	14	14	42

=== Men's events ===
Event	Gold		Silver		Bronze	
500 m	Pavel Kulizhnikov; Russia	68.931	Michel Mulder; Netherlands	69.622	Laurent Dubreuil; Canada	69.694
1000 m	Shani Davis; United States	1:08.57	Pavel Kulizhnikov; Russia	1:08.61	Kjeld Nuis; Netherlands	1:08.71
1500 m	Denis Yuskov; Russia	1:43.36	Denny Morrison; Canada	1:45.08	Koen Verweij; Netherlands	1:45.15
5000 m	Sven Kramer; Netherlands	6:09.65	Jorrit Bergsma; Netherlands	6:11.53	Douwe de Vries; Netherlands	6:18.24
10000 m	Jorrit Bergsma; Netherlands	12:54.82	Erik Jan Kooiman; Netherlands	13:02.57	Patrick Beckert; Germany	13:10.95
Team pursuit	Netherlands; Sven Kramer; Koen Verweij; Douwe de Vries	3:41.40	Canada; Ted-Jan Bloemen; Denny Morrison; Jordan Belchos	3:44.09	South Korea; Lee Seung-hoon; Kim Cheol-min; Ko Byung-wook	3:44.96
Mass start	Arjan Stroetinga; Netherlands		Fabio Francolini; Italy		Alexis Contin; France	

=== Women's events ===
Event	Gold		Silver		Bronze	
500 m	Heather Richardson; United States	75.332	Brittany Bowe; United States	75.785	Nao Kodaira; Japan	75.893
1000 m	Brittany Bowe; United States	1:13.90	Heather Richardson; United States	1:14.49	Karolína Erbanová; Czech Republic	1:15.26
1500 m	Brittany Bowe; United States	1:54.27	Ireen Wüst; Netherlands	1:54.76	Heather Richardson; United States	1:55.60
3000 m	Martina Sáblíková; Czech Republic	4:02.17	Ireen Wüst; Netherlands	4:03.46	Marije Joling; Netherlands	4:05.51
5000 m	Martina Sáblíková; Czech Republic	6:52.73	Carlijn Achtereekte; Netherlands	6:54.49	Claudia Pechstein; Germany	6:56.53
Team pursuit	Japan; Ayaka Kikuchi; Miho Takagi; Nana Takagi	3:01.53	Netherlands; Marije Joling; Marrit Leenstra; Ireen Wüst	3:01.55	Russia; Olga Graf; Yuliya Skokova; Natalya Voronina	3:03.19
Mass start	Irene Schouten; Netherlands		Ivanie Blondin; Canada		Mariska Huisman; Netherlands	
