= Ayaka Kikuchi (speed skater) =

Japanese speed skater (born 1987)

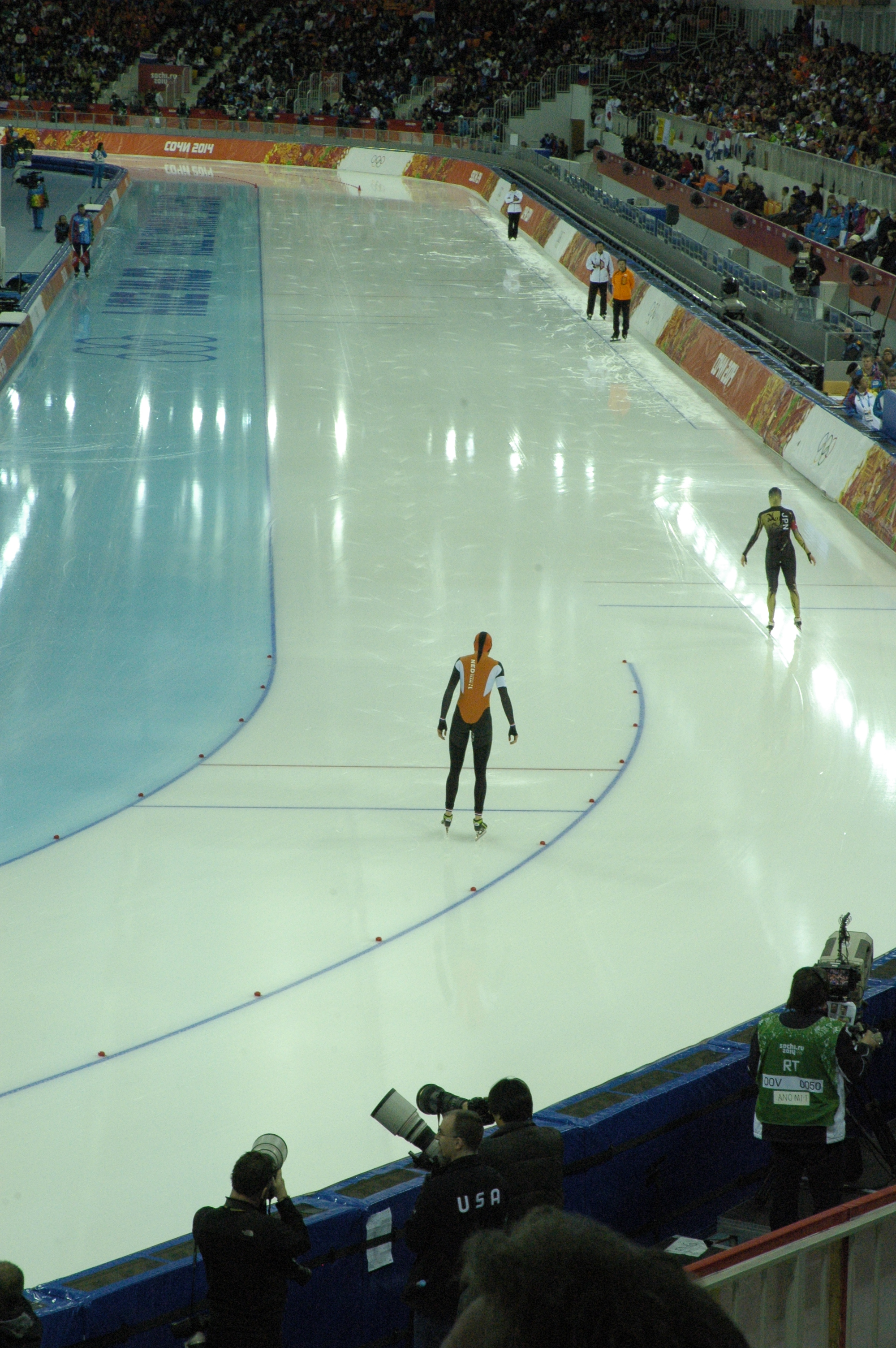
- Kikuchi (right) at the 2014 Winter Olympics

Personal information
- Born: 28 June 1987 (age 39) Japan

Sport
- Country: Japan
- Sport: Speed skating
Medal record
Women's speed skating
Representing Japan
Olympic Games
Gold medal – first place	2018 Pyeongchang	Team pursuit
World Championships
Gold medal – first place	2015 Heerenveen	Team pursuit
Asian Championships
Silver medal – second place	2012 Astana	Allround
Bronze medal – third place	2011 Harbin	Allround

Ayaka Kikuchi (菊池 彩花, Kikuchi Ayaka; born 28 June 1987) is a Japanese speed skater.

== Biography ==
Kikuchi won bronze at the 2011 Asian Speed Skating Championships and silver at the 2012 Asian Speed Skating Championships. With these results she qualified for the World Allround Speed Skating Championships in both 2011 (finished 22nd) and 2012 (finished 19th).

In the 2014 Winter Olympics Kikuchi participated in the 1500 meters, finishing 31st, and was part of the women's team pursuit, who finished fourth.

In 2015 Ayaka Kikuchi became a world champion, when in the 2015 World Single Distance Speed Skating Championships she won the gold medal in the team pursuit where she participated together with the sisters Miho and Nana Takagi.

In 2018, Kikuchi was part of the Japanese team that won the Olympics women team pursuit gold medal.

== Personal records ==
Distance	Result	Date	Location
500 m	39.80	7 January 2012	Alau Ice Palace, Astana
1000 m	1:19.10	27 December 2011	Meiji Hokkaido-Tokachi Oval, Obihiro
1500 m	1:54.12	21 November 2015	Utah Olympic Oval, Salt Lake City
3000 m	4:11.86	12 February 2011	Olympic Oval, Calgary
5000 m	7:13.69	18 February 2011	Utah Olympic Oval, Salt Lake City

== Honours ==
- Medal with Purple Ribbon (2018)

== See also ==
- World record progression team pursuit speed skating women
