= Olga Graf =

Russian speed skater (born 1983)

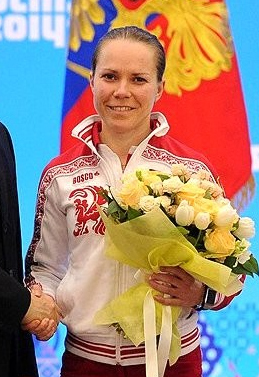
- Graf in 2014

Personal information
- Born: 15 July 1983 (age 42) Omsk, Soviet Union
- Height: 1.60 m (5 ft 3 in)
- Weight: 56 kg (123 lb)

Sport
- Country: Russia
- Sport: Speed skating
Medal record
Olympic Games
Bronze medal – third place	2014 Sochi	3000 m
Bronze medal – third place	2014 Sochi	Team pursuit
World Allround Championships
Silver medal – second place	2014 Heerenveen	Allround
World Championships
Bronze medal – third place	2015 Heerenveen	Team pursuit
Bronze medal – third place	2016 Kolomna	Team pursuit
Bronze medal – third place	2017 Gangneung	Team pursuit
European Championships
Silver medal – second place	2018 Kolomna	Team pursuit

Olga Borisovna Graf (Russian: Ольга Борисовна Граф; born 15 July 1983) is a Russian speed skater. Graf competed at the 2014 Winter Olympics, where she won bronze medals both in the 3000 metres event and in the team pursuit.

== Personal life ==
Olga Graf was born 15 July 1983 in Omsk, Soviet Union. She began speed skating in 1995 when her martial arts instructor suggested that she try it. She attended the Siberian State University of Physical Education and Sport. In 2007, she joined the Russian national speed skating team.

Graf is married to Rustam Madaminov and lives in Kolomna, Russia. She speaks Russian, German and English.

== Early speed skating career ==
Graf gradually worked her way up the world standings in women's speed skating. In her debut 2007–08 World Cup appearance she finished 56th in the 3000m/5000m. In the 2009–10 World Cup she improved her 3000m/5000m result slightly to 46th. She performed better that year in the 1500m where she finished 35th. She did not qualify for the 2010 Winter Olympics in Vancouver.

It was not until the 2011–12 World Cup that Graf was able to crack the top ten in the individual. That year she finished 9th in the 3000m/5000m. In the 2012–13 World Cup she placed 7th in the 3000m/5000m and 3rd in the 5000m event.

== 2014 Sochi Olympics ==
At the 2014 Winter Olympics in the 3000m event Graf skated in the 10th pair against Jilleanne Rookard of the United States. She finished with a time of 4:03.47 which was good enough for first place. However, two pairs later Martina Sáblíková of the Czech Republic finished with a time of 4:01.95, pushing Graf into second. In the thirteenth and final pair Ireen Wüst of the Netherlands finished with a time 4:00.34 and win the gold medal and moving Graf into third for bronze.

Graf finished 4th in the 5000 metres event, missing out on a podium position by 0.11 of a second. In the team pursuit, Graf helped her team win the bronze medal behind Netherlands and Poland.

== 2018 Pyeongchang Olympics ==
Graf qualified for the 2018 Winter Olympics and was invited to participate by the International Olympic Committee. She, however, said that she is not going to participate. She said that her main target was the team pursuit, and out of four Russian female skaters who qualified IOC only invited two (including Graf) to participate, so that the Olympic Athletes from Russia were not able to form a pursuit team. She was not planning to retire in 2017/18 season.

== Personal records ==
Personal records
Women's speed skating
Event	Result	Date	Location	Notes
500 m	39.84	22 March 2014	Thialf, Heerenveen	
1000 m	1:19.79	16 October 2011	Kolomna Speed Skating Center, Kolomna	
1500 m	1:55.67	23 March 2014	Thialf, Heerenveen	
3000 m	4:01.31	7 November 2015	Olympic Oval, Calgary	
5000 m	6:55.77	19 February 2014	Adler Arena, Sochi	
