= 2012 European Speed Skating Championships =

International speed skating competition

European Speed Skating Championships
- Venue: City Park Ice Rink; Budapest, Hungary
- Dates: 6–8 January 2012
- Competitors: 54 from 18 nations

Medalist men
1st place, gold medalist(s)		Sven Kramer	NED
2nd place, silver medalist(s)		Jan Blokhuijsen	NED
3rd place, bronze medalist(s)		Håvard Bøkko	NOR

Medalist women
1st place, gold medalist(s)		Martina Sáblíková	CZE
2nd place, silver medalist(s)		Claudia Pechstein	GER
3rd place, bronze medalist(s)		Ireen Wüst	NED

The 2012 European Speed Skating Championships was the 37th continental speed skating event for women and the 106th for men, that was held at the City Park Ice Rink in Budapest, Hungary, from 6 to 8 January 2012. The competition was also a qualifying event for the 2012 World Allround Speed Skating Championships as the entry quotas were allocated according to the results of the European Championships.

In the absence of defending champion Ivan Skobrev, who did not participate due to an injury, Dutchman Sven Kramer took the men's European title. This was his fifth victory, having won previously four consecutive European Championships between 2007 and 2010. Kramer also ran track records both in the 1500 meters and 5000 metres event, and his overall score of 156.197 is the best ever result at the City Park Ice Rink as well.

In the women's competition previous year's gold medalist Martina Sáblíková retained her title, achieving her third European success in row and fourth overall. Sáblíková also set a new track record in 3000 metres with a time of 4:16.09.

Further two records were beaten over the weekend, both in 500 metres. On the first day of the championships, Sáblíková's compatriot Karolína Erbanová set a new best time, and a day later Konrad Niedźwiedzki of Poland ran a track record on the shortest distance.

== Venue ==
The competition took place at the City Park Ice Rink, an outdoor artificial skating rink situated in the downtown of Budapest. Prior to the championships, the rink went through a renovation and modernization for a fee of 4.7 billion Hungarian Forint (approximately €16 million), of which 3 billion came from the European Regional Development Fund. As a result, the main building was restored to its 19th-century look, the ice surface was expanded by 15 percent and a 210 kilometres (130 mi) embedded cooling system was laid down as well. The races were held on a standard track of 400 meters with outer curves of 29 meters and inner curves of 25 meters radii. Both racing lanes were 4 meters wide, with an additional inside training track of the similar width.

== Participating nations ==
A provisional list of competitors and staff had to be presented until 19 December 2011, while the final deadline of applications for the European Championships was closed on 3 January 2012. Every European member federation of the International Skating Union (ISU), whose racer met the qualification criteria were eligible to delegate one participant to the event, and, according to the rules of the ISU, the following nations had the right to enter additional competitors in virtue of their results in the previous continental event:

- Women:
  - 4 competitors: Netherlands
  - 3 competitors: Czech Republic, Germany, Norway, Poland, Russia
  - 2 competitors: Austria, Belarus
- Men:
  - 4 competitors: Netherlands, Norway
  - 3 competitors: Poland, Russia
  - 2 competitors: Belarus, Belgium, France, Germany, Italy, Latvia, Sweden

Eventually 54 competitors from 18 nations registered officially for the championships, not including the substitutes, in the following distribution:

- Austria (2)
- Belarus (2)
- Belgium (3)
- Czech Republic (3)
- Denmark (1)
- Finland (1)
- France (2)
- Germany (5)
- Hungary (1)
- Italy (2)
- Latvia (1)
- Netherlands (8)
- Norway (7)
- Poland (6)
- Romania (1)
- Russia (6)
- Sweden (1)
- Switzerland (2)

Although registered for the event, Kaitlyn McGregor from Switzerland and Joel Eriksson from Sweden did not participate at the European Championships.

== Events ==
=== Schedule ===
5 January Thursday	6 January Friday	7 January Saturday	8 January Sunday
Team leaders meeting Opening draw	Opening ceremony 500 metres women 3000 metres women Drawing for Saturday’s distances	500 metres men 1500 metres women 5000 metres men Drawing for Sunday’s distances	1500 metres men 5000 metres women 10000 metres men Award ceremony

=== Women's competition ===
The women's European Championship were held over three days, with the 500 metres and the 3000 metres event in the first day, followed by the 1500 metres event on the second day. Skaters were awarded points according to their times, and the twelve best placed competitors after the second day were eligible to participate in the 5000 metres closing event on the last day of the championship.

The first fourteen skaters earned a spot for their countries for the 2012 World Allround Championships, which means that the Netherlands got four, Russia, Germany, Norway and Poland three and the Czech Republic one place.

The entries for the 2013 European Championships were also determined using the results of the European Championships. Countries with at least three skaters in the first twelve earned four entry positions (Netherlands), countries with at least two skaters in the first sixteen earned three quotas (Czech Republic, Germany, Norway, Poland, Russia), and countries with at least one skater in the first twenty earned two places for the next continental championship (Austria, Belgium). All other European ISU members have the right to delegate one skater, subject to the qualifying time limits are met.

==== 500 metres ====
Rank	Athlete	Country	Time	Behind	Points
1	Karolína Erbanová	Czech Republic	39.87 TR	0.00	39.870
2	Ireen Wüst	Netherlands	40.21	0.34	40.210
3	Yuliya Skokova	Russia	40.40	0.53	40.400
4	Yekaterina Lobysheva	Russia	40.62	0.75	40.620
5	Claudia Pechstein	Germany	40.67	0.80	40.670
6	Annouk van der Weijden	Netherlands	41.13	1.26	41.130
7	Ida Njåtun	Norway	41.20	1.33	41.200
8	Natalia Czerwonka	Poland	41.22	1.35	41.220
9	Linda de Vries	Netherlands	41.33	1.46	41.330
10	Hege Bøkko	Norway	41.48	1.61	41.480
11	Diane Valkenburg	Netherlands	41.56	1.69	41.560
12	Katarzyna Woźniak	Poland	41.59	1.72	41.590
13	Mari Hemmer	Norway	41.73	1.86	41.730
14	Martina Sáblíková	Czech Republic	41.79	1.92	41.790
15	Olga Graf	Russia	42.08	2.21	42.080
16	Isabell Ost	Germany	42.11	2.24	42.110
17	Luiza Złotkowska	Poland	42.22	2.35	42.220
18	Anna Rokita	Austria	42.32	2.45	42.320
19	Bente Kraus	Germany	43.07	3.20	43.070
20	Ágota Tóth	Hungary	43.29	3.42	43.290
21	Nele Armée	Belgium	43.56	3.69	43.560
22	Tatyana Mikhailova	Belarus	43.58	3.71	43.580
23	Sara Bak	Denmark	44.81	4.94	44.810

==== 3000 metres ====
Rank	Athlete	Country	Time	Behind	Points
1	Martina Sáblíková	Czech Republic	4:16.09 TR	0.00	42.681
2	Natalia Czerwonka	Poland	4:19.41	3.32	43.235
3	Claudia Pechstein	Germany	4:19.71	3.62	43.285
4	Diane Valkenburg	Netherlands	4:21.29	5.20	43.548
5	Ireen Wüst	Netherlands	4:22.59	6.50	43.765
6	Isabell Ost	Germany	4:22.65	6.56	43.775
7	Linda de Vries	Netherlands	4:25.40	9.31	44.233
8	Olga Graf	Russia	4:26.08	9.99	44.346
9	Hege Bøkko	Norway	4:26.39	10.30	44.398
10	Yuliya Skokova	Russia	4:26.78	10.69	44.463
11	Katarzyna Woźniak	Poland	4:28.38	12.29	44.730
12	Annouk van der Weijden	Netherlands	4:28.84	12.75	44.806
13	Bente Kraus	Germany	4:28.85	12.76	44.808
14	Anna Rokita	Austria	4:29.37	13.28	44.895
15	Yekaterina Lobysheva	Russia	4:30.20	14.11	45.033
16	Nele Armée	Belgium	4:31.99	15.90	45.331
17	Ida Njåtun	Norway	4:33.01	16.92	45.501
18	Luiza Złotkowska	Poland	4:35.67	19.58	45.945
19	Mari Hemmer	Norway	4:36.37	20.28	46.061
20	Karolína Erbanová	Czech Republic	4:41.89	25.80	46.981
21	Tatyana Mikhailova	Belarus	4:43.76	27.67	47.293
22	Sara Bak	Denmark	4:45.07	28.98	48.511
23	Ágota Tóth	Hungary	4:50.82	34.73	48.470

==== 1500 metres ====
Rank	Athlete	Country	Time	Behind	Points
1	Martina Sáblíková	Czech Republic	2:03.64	0.00	41.123
2	Linda de Vries	Netherlands	2:04.70	1.06	41.556
3	Yuliya Skokova	Russia	2:05.18	1.54	41.726
4	Diane Valkenburg	Netherlands	2:05.61	1.97	41.870
5	Yekaterina Lobysheva	Russia	2:06.01	2.37	42.003
6	Ireen Wüst	Netherlands	2:06.36	2.72	42.120
7	Olga Graf	Russia	2:07.93	4.29	42.643
8	Annouk van der Weijden	Netherlands	2:08.15	4.51	42.716
9	Natalia Czerwonka	Poland	2:08.65	5.01	42.883
10	Claudia Pechstein	Germany	2:08.72	5.08	42.906
11	Hege Bøkko	Norway	2:09.03	5.39	43.010
12	Ida Njåtun	Norway	2:09.19	5.55	43.063
13	Katarzyna Woźniak	Poland	2:09.56	5.92	43.186
14	Luiza Złotkowska	Poland	2:10.08	6.44	43.360
15	Nele Armée	Belgium	2:10.81	7.17	43.603
16	Karolína Erbanová	Czech Republic	2:10.91	7.27	43.636
17	Anna Rokita	Austria	2:11.38	7.74	43.793
18	Isabell Ost	Germany	2:11.68	8.04	43.893
19	Mari Hemmer	Norway	2:12.07	8.43	44.023
20	Tatyana Mikhailova	Belarus	2:13.49	9.85	44.496
21	Bente Kraus	Germany	2:14.29	10.65	44.763
22	Ágota Tóth	Hungary	2:15.44	11.80	45.146
23	Sara Bak	Denmark	2:16.56	12.92	45.520

==== 5000 metres ====
Rank	Athlete	Country	Time	Behind	Points
1	Martina Sáblíková	Czech Republic	7:22.38	0.00	44.238
2	Claudia Pechstein	Germany	7:34.51	12.13	45.451
3	Ireen Wüst	Netherlands	7:43.59	21.21	46.359
4	Linda de Vries	Netherlands	7:45.27	22.89	46.527
5	Diane Valkenburg	Netherlands	7:48.04	25.66	46.804
6	Olga Graf	Russia	7:52.54	30.16	47.254
7	Isabell Ost	Germany	7:55.11	32.73	47.511
8	Natalia Czerwonka	Poland	7:56.18	33.80	47.618
9	Annouk van der Weijden	Netherlands	8:00.32	37.94	48.032
10	Yuliya Skokova	Russia	8:02.16	39.78	48.216
11	Katarzyna Woźniak	Poland	8:08.95	46.57	48.895
12	Hege Bøkko	Norway	8:35.95	73.57	51.595

==== Points evolution and overall result ====
Rank	Athlete	Country	500 m	3000 m	1500 m	5000 m	Behind
1st place, gold medalist(s)	Martina Sáblíková	Czech Republic	41.790 (14)	84.471 (4)	125.684 (1)	169.922 (1)	0.00
2nd place, silver medalist(s)	Claudia Pechstein	Germany	40.670 (5)	83.955 (1)	126.861 (4)	172.312 (2)	2.39
3rd place, bronze medalist(s)	Ireen Wüst	Netherlands	40.210 (2)	83.975 (2)	126.095 (1)	172.454 (3)	2.59
4	Linda de Vries	Netherlands	41.330 (9)	85.563 (7)	127.129 (6)	173.656 (4)	3.74
5	Diane Valkenburg	Netherlands	41.560 (11)	85.108 (6)	126.978 (5)	173.782 (5)	3.86
6	Yuliya Skokova	Russia	40.400 (3)	84.863 (5)	126.589 (3)	174.805 (6)	4.89
7	Natalia Czerwonka	Poland	41.220 (8)	84.455 (3)	127.338 (7)	174.956 (7) PB	5.04
8	Olga Graf	Russia	42.080 (15)	86.426 (13)	129.069 (11)	176.323 (8)	6.41
9	Annouk van der Weijden	Netherlands	41.130 (6)	85.936 (11)	128.652 (9)	176.684 (9)	6.77
10	Isabell Ost	Germany	42.110 (16)	85.885 (10)	129.778 (14)	177.289 (10)	7.37
11	Katarzyna Woźniak	Poland	41.590 (12)	86.320 (12)	129.506 (12)	178.401 (11)	8.48
12	Hege Bøkko	Norway	41.480 (10)	85.878 (9)	128.888 (10)	180.483 (12)	10.57
13	Yekaterina Lobysheva	Russia	40.620 (4)	85.653 (8)	127.656 (8)		
14	Ida Njåtun	Norway	41.200 (7)	86.701 (14)	129.764 (13)		
15	Karolína Erbanová	Czech Republic	39.870 (1)	86.851 (15)	130.487 (15)		
16	Anna Rokita	Austria	42.320 (18)	87.215 (16)	131.008 (16)		
17	Luiza Złotkowska	Poland	42.220 (17)	88.165 (19)	131.525 (17)		
18	Mari Hemmer	Norway	41.730 (13)	87.791 (17)	131.814 (18)		
19	Nele Armée	Belgium	43.560 (21)	88.891 (20)	132.494 (19)		
20	Bente Kraus	Germany	43.070 (19)	87.878 (18)	132.641 (20)		
21	Tatyana Mikhailova	Belarus	43.580 (22)	90.873 (21)	135.369 (21)		
22	Ágota Tóth	Hungary	43.290 (20)	91.760 (22)	136.906 (22)		
23	Sara Bak	Denmark	44.810 (23)	92.321 (23)	137.841 (23)		

=== Men's competition ===
The men's event took place on Saturday and Sunday, with the 500 metres and the 5000 metres race at the first day and the 1500 and 10,000 meters final race in the second day. After the first day, the best 24 out of the 29 skaters got the change to participate in the 5000 meters event, while the best 12 competitors after three events took part in the 10,000 meters race.

According to the ISU rules, the fourteen best placed skaters won for their country an entry spots for the 2012 Allround World Championships. Based on the final result, the Netherlands earned four places for the World event, Norway and Poland got two, and Belgium, France, Germany, Latvia and Russia got one each.

The places for the 2013 Allround European Championships were also distributed using the classification of the European Championships. Countries with at least three skaters in the first twelve earned four spots (Netherlands), countries with at least two skaters in the first sixteen earned three (Norway and Poland), and countries with at least one skater in the first twenty earned two starting places (Austria, Belgium, France, Germany, Italy, Latvia, Russia). All other European ISU members have got one spot, subject to the time limits set are met.

==== 500 metres ====
Rank	Athlete	Country	Time	Behind	Points
1	Konrad Niedźwiedzki	Poland	36.89 TR	0.00	36.890
2	Zbigniew Bródka	Poland	36.90	0.01	36.900
3	Jan Blokhuijsen	Netherlands	36.93	0.04	36.930
4	Tommi Pulli	Finland	37.14	0.25	37.140
5	Håvard Bøkko	Norway	37.25	0.36	37.250
6	Haralds Silovs	Latvia	37.46	0.57	37.460
7	Jan Szymański	Poland	37.48	0.59	37.480
7	Benjamin Macé	France	37.48	0.59	37.480
9	Kristian Reistad Fredriksen	Norway	37.51	0.62	37.510
10	Koen Verweij	Netherlands	37.73	0.84	37.730
11	Bram Smallenbroek	Austria	37.75	0.86	37.750
12	Sven Kramer	Netherlands	37.77	0.88	37.770
13	Alexis Contin	France	37.80	0.91	37.800
14	Ted-Jan Bloemen	Netherlands	37.84	0.95	37.840
15	Luca Stefani	Italy	37.89	1.00	37.890
16	Pavel Baynov	Russia	38.00	1.11	38.000
17	Sverre Lunde Pedersen	Norway	38.04	1.15	38.040
18	Simen Spieler Nilsen	Norway	38.17	1.28	38.170
19	Milan Sáblík	Czech Republic	38.24	1.35	38.240
20	Marco Cignini	Italy	38.31	1.42	38.310
21	Vitaly Mikhailov	Belarus	38.34	1.45	38.340
22	Sergey Gryaztsov	Russia	38.35	1.46	38.350
23	Denis Yuskov	Russia	38.46	1.57	38.460
24	Patrick Beckert	Germany	38.56	1.67	38.560
25	Bart Swings	Belgium	38.81	1.92	38.810
26	Moritz Geisreiter	Germany	39.33	2.44	39.330
27	Ferre Spruyt	Belgium	39.46 PB	2.57	39.460
28	Martin Hänggi	Switzerland	40.32	3.43	40.320
29	Marian Ion	Romania	DSQ	—	—

==== 5000 metres ====
Rank	Athlete	Country	Time	Behind	Points
1	Sven Kramer	Netherlands	6:31.82 TR	0.00	39.182
2	Jan Blokhuijsen	Netherlands	6:36.49	4.67	39.649
3	Alexis Contin	France	6:38.08	6.26	39.808
4	Ted-Jan Bloemen	Netherlands	6:38.27	6.45	39.827
5	Håvard Bøkko	Norway	6:40.60	8.78	40.060
6	Haralds Silovs	Latvia	6:41.39	9.57	40.139
7	Koen Verweij	Netherlands	6:41.42	9.60	40.142
8	Denis Yuskov	Russia	6:41.89	10.07	40.189
9	Bart Swings	Belgium	6:43.33	11.51	40.333
10	Sverre Lunde Pedersen	Norway	6:44.64	12.82	40.464
11	Patrick Beckert	Germany	6:45.22	13.40	40.522
12	Moritz Geisreiter	Germany	6:46.46	14.64	40.646
13	Jan Szymański	Poland	6:47.61	15.79	40.761
14	Luca Stefani	Italy	6:56.05	24.23	41.605
15	Kristian Reistad Fredriksen	Norway	6:57.42	25.60	41.742
16	Marco Cignini	Italy	6:58.67	26.85	41.867
17	Sergey Gryaztsov	Russia	7:00.38	28.56	42.038
18	Bram Smallenbroek	Austria	7:00.69	28.87	42.069
19	Ferre Spruyt	Belgium	7:01.38	29.56	42.138
20	Vitaly Mikhailov	Belarus	7:01.44	29.62	42.144
21	Konrad Niedźwiedzki	Poland	7:02.62	30.80	42.262
22	Benjamin Macé	France	7:03.02	31.20	42.302
23	Zbigniew Bródka	Poland	7:06.06	34.24	42.606
24	Milan Sáblík	Czech Republic	7:07.68	35.86	42.768
25	Simen Spieler Nilsen	Norway	7:08.04	36.22	42.804
26	Martin Hänggi	Switzerland	7:09.80	37.98	42.980
27	Marian Ion	Romania	7:14.52	42.70	43.452
28	Pavel Baynov	Russia	7:16.25	44.43	43.625
29	Tommi Pulli	Finland	7:24.50	52.68	44.450

==== 1500 metres ====
Rank	Athlete	Country	Time	Behind	Points
1	Sven Kramer	Netherlands	1:53.98 TR	0.00	37.993
2	Sverre Lunde Pedersen	Norway	1:54.87	0.89	38.290
3	Jan Blokhuijsen	Netherlands	1:54.93	0.95	38.310
4	Denis Yuskov	Russia	1:55.13	1.15	38.376
5	Koen Verweij	Netherlands	1:55.42	1.44	38.473
6	Haralds Silovs	Latvia	1:55.48	1.50	38.493
7	Zbigniew Bródka	Poland	1:55.98	2.00	38.660
8	Bart Swings	Belgium	1:56.08	2.10	38.693
9	Håvard Bøkko	Norway	1:56.35	2.37	38.783
10	Jan Szymański	Poland	1:56.55	2.57	38.850
11	Bram Smallenbroek	Austria	1:57.44	3.46	39.146
12	Alexis Contin	France	1:57.58	3.60	39.193
13	Benjamin Macé	France	1:57.80	3.82	39.266
14	Konrad Niedźwiedzki	Poland	1:57.92	3.94	39.306
15	Sergey Gryaztsov	Russia	1:58.73	4.75	39.576
16	Patrick Beckert	Germany	1:59.08	5.10	39.693
17	Kristian Reistad Fredriksen	Norway	1:59.19	5.21	39.730
18	Luca Stefani	Italy	1:59.82	5.84	39.940
19	Marco Cignini	Italy	1:59.97	5.99	39.990
20	Ferre Spruyt	Belgium	2:00.00	6.02	40.000
21	Vitaly Mikhailov	Belarus	2:00.75	6.77	40.520
22	Milan Sáblík	Czech Republic	2:00.95	6.97	40.316
23	Ted-Jan Bloemen	Netherlands	2:01.58	7.60	40.526
24	Moritz Geisreiter	Germany	2:01.64	7.66	40.566

==== 10000 metres ====
Rank	Athlete	Country	Time	Behind	Points
1	Sven Kramer	Netherlands	13:45.05	0.00	41.252
2	Jan Blokhuijsen	Netherlands	13:52.48	7.43	41.624
3	Håvard Bøkko	Norway	14:02.83	17.78	42.141
4	Alexis Contin	France	14:05.84	20.79	42.292
5	Koen Verweij	Netherlands	14:05.98	20.93	42.299
6	Ted-Jan Bloemen	Netherlands	14:08.83	23.71	42.441
7	Bart Swings	Belgium	14:19.14	34.09	42.957
8	Sverre Lunde Pedersen	Norway	14:21.61	36.56	43.080
9	Haralds Silovs	Latvia	14:23.38 NR	38.33	43.169
10	Denis Yuskov	Russia	14:23.93	38.88	43.196
11	Jan Szymański	Poland	14:41.24	56.19	44.062
12	Zbigniew Bródka	Poland	14:44.55 PB	59.50	44.227

==== Points evolution and overall result ====
Rank	Athlete	Country	500 m	5000 m	1500 m	10000 m	Behind
1st place, gold medalist(s)	Sven Kramer	Netherlands	37.770 (12)	76.952 (2)	114.945 (2)	156.197 (1) TR	0.00
2nd place, silver medalist(s)	Jan Blokhuijsen	Netherlands	36.930 (3)	76.579 (1)	114.889 (1)	156.513 (2)	0.32
3rd place, bronze medalist(s)	Håvard Bøkko	Norway	37.250 (5)	77.310 (3)	116.093 (4)	158.234 (3)	2.04
4	Koen Verweij	Netherlands	37.730 (10)	77.872 (7)	116.345 (5)	158.644 (4)	2.45
5	Alexis Contin	France	37.800 (13)	77.608 (5)	116.801 (7)	159.093 (5)	2.95
6	Haralds Silovs	Latvia	37.460 (6)	77.599 (4)	116.092 (3)	159.261 (6) PB	3.07
7	Sverre Lunde Pedersen	Norway	38.040 (17)	78.504 (9)	116.794 (6)	159.874 (7)	3.68
8	Denis Yuskov	Russia	38.460 (23)	78.649 (10)	117.025 (8)	160.221 (8)	4.03
9	Ted-Jan Bloemen	Netherlands	37.840 (14)	77.667 (6)	118.193 (12)	160.634 (9)	4.44
10	Bart Swings	Belgium	38.810 (25)	79.143 (12)	117.836 (10)	160.793 (10) PB	4.60
11	Jan Szymański	Poland	37.480 (7)	78.241 (8)	117.091 (9)	161.153 (11) PB	4.96
12	Zbigniew Bródka	Poland	36.900 (2)	79.506 (16)	118.166 (11)	162.393 (12)	6.20
13	Konrad Niedźwiedzki	Poland	36.890 (1)	79.152 (13)	118.458 (13)		
14	Patrick Beckert	Germany	38.560 (24)	79.082 (11)	118.775 (14)		
15	Bram Smallenbroek	Austria	37.750 (11)	79.819 (18)	118.965 (15)		
16	Kristian Reistad Fredriksen	Norway	37.510 (9)	79.252 (14)	118.982 (16)		
17	Benjamin Macé	France	37.480 (7)	79.782 (17)	119.048 (17)		
18	Luca Stefani	Italy	37.890 (15)	79.495 (15)	119.435 (18)		
19	Sergey Gryaztsov	Russia	38.350 (22)	80.388 (21)	119.964 (19)		
20	Marco Cignini	Italy	38.310 (20)	80.177 (20)	120.167 (20)		
21	Moritz Geisreiter	Germany	39.330 (26)	79.976 (19)	120.522 (21)		
22	Vitaly Mikhailov	Belarus	38.340 (21)	80.484 (22)	120.734 (22)		
23	Milan Sáblík	Czech Republic	38.240 (19)	81.008 (24)	121.324 (23)		
24	Ferre Spruyt	Belgium	39.460 (27)	81.598 (26)	121.598 (24)		
25	Simen Spieler Nilsen	Norway	38.170 (18)	80.974 (23)			
26	Tommi Pulli	Finland	37.140 (4)	81.590 (25)			
27	Pavel Baynov	Russia	38.000 (16)	81.625 (27)			
28	Martin Hänggi	Switzerland	40.320 (28)	83.300 (28)			
29	Marian Ion	Romania	920.000 (DSQ)	963.452 (29)			

== See also ==
- 2012 World Allround Speed Skating Championships
