= György Pásztor =

Hungarian sports administrator (1923–2022)

- Born: 2 March 1923; Törökbálint, Hungary
- Died: 22 August 2022 (aged 99)
- Education: Pázmány Péter Catholic University
- Occupation: Pharmacist
- Known for: Hungarian Ice Hockey Federation; Hungarian Olympic Committee; International Ice Hockey Federation
- Awards: Hungarian Order of Merit; IIHF Hall of Fame; Hungarian Ice Hockey Hall of Fame
Ice hockey career
- Position: Forward
- Played for: BKE; Csepel SC; Meteor; Builders
- National team: Hungary
- Playing career: 1941–1960

György Pásztor ([ˈɟørɟ ˈpaːstor]: 2 March 1923 – 22 August 2022) was a Hungarian ice hockey player and sports administrator. He won four Hungarian championships as a player, and was a member of the Hungary men's national team. He later served as president of the Hungarian Ice Sports Association, helped establish the Hungarian Ice Hockey Federation, and was a member of the Hungarian Olympic Committee. He was a delegate to the International Ice Hockey Federation, and was chairman of its medical committee for 12 years, overseeing tests for doping in sport. He was inducted into both the IIHF Hall of Fame, and the Hungarian Ice Hockey Hall of Fame. He was made an officer of the Hungarian Order of Merit in 2003, and was referred to as "Mr. Hockey" in Hungary.

== Early life and education ==
Pásztor was born on 2 March 1923, in Törökbálint, Hungary. He learned how to skate by gliding around frozen ponds as a youth, and improvised his skates by strapping blades to the bottom of his shoes. He began playing ice hockey in 1933 at age 10, while attending Fasori Gimnázium in Budapest. He practiced with the school for 90 minutes every day at the City Park Ice Rink. He won the high school championship with Fasori in 1937, and later graduated in 1941.

== Hockey playing career ==
Pásztor joined the Hungary junior men's national ice hockey team at age 17, and played with the team in Garmisch-Partenkirchen during 1940, at a winter sports week event held in lieu of the cancelled 1940 Winter Olympics. He played for the Hungary men's national ice hockey team during a span of 18 years from 1941 to 1959. Due to socialist politics in the 1950s, he was limited to travel within other Eastern Bloc countries.

Pásztor won six Hungarian national championship titles during his playing career. He played the forward position, and was a player-coach for several seasons. He played for the Budapest Skating Club from 1941 to 1944, winning his first national championship in the 1943–44 season. His playing career was interrupted during World War II, and resumed with the hockey team at Csepel SC during the 1948–49 season. He later played the 1949–50 season with Mallerd, and continued with the same team when it was renamed Meteor Mallerd for the 1950–51 season. The team changed names again, and Pásztor played with Red Meteor from 1951 to 1959. He won three national championships with Red Meteor in 1952, 1957, and 1959. Pásztor later said that one of his favorite memories of playing was the 1959 Hungarian championship, when he scored the winning goal with 18 seconds remaining in the game versus Dózsa Újpest. He finished his playing career as a player-coach with Builders in the 1959–60 season.

== Hungarian sports leader ==
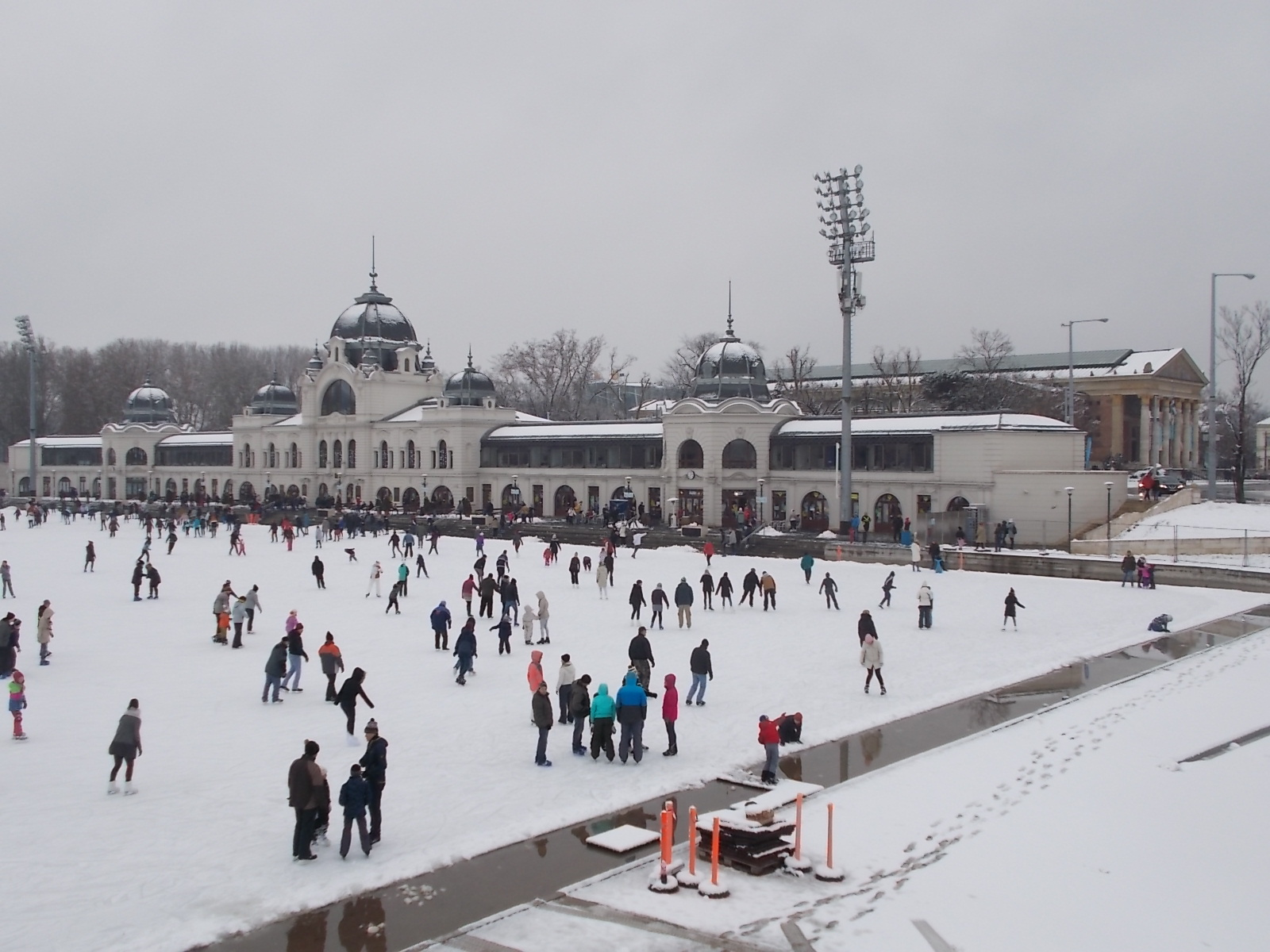
City Park Ice Rink and the Skating Hall

Pásztor became the players' representative on the board of directors for the Hungarian Ice Sports Association in 1957, which oversaw hockey and other ice sports. He served as president of that association from 1963 until 1988, when he helped establish the independent Hungarian Ice Hockey Federation (MJSZ), and then served as vice-president of the new organization until 1994. He felt that to improve ice hockey in Hungary, a stronger national league was needed, which required more youths, more arenas, and proper leadership. When the MJSZ historical committee decided to establish a national ice hockey museum, Pásztor was asked to be a consultant.

Pásztor was a radio reporter for Hungary at the 1972 Summer Olympics, and became a member of the Hungarian Olympic Committee in 1989. He also served as the manager of the Hungarian national men's ice hockey team at the 2000 Men's World Ice Hockey Championships, when Hungary won the gold medal in its division.

== International hockey service ==
Pásztor was the first person to represent Hungary at the International Ice Hockey Federation (IIHF) meetings, and served as his country's delegate from 1959 to 1982. He was chosen for the role due to his ability to speak English and German, the dominant languages in Europe at the time. His first international duties were attending the 1959 Ice Hockey World Championships in Prague, on behalf of Hungary. He later began serving as a member of the IIHF medical committee in 1971. From 1982 to 1994, he served in the dual role of being an IIHF executive council member, and as the chairman of the medical committee to oversee doping in sport. When the testing for doping in sport was first introduced, he thought that ice hockey would not be deeply affected, but later said that notion was a mistake. He also served on the board for the IIHF European Champions Cup during this time. During his tenure with the IIHF, Pásztor had been involved in 45 Ice Hockey World Championships, and seven Winter Olympic Games. He attended his final IIHF annual congress in 2019, at age 96.

== Awards and honors ==
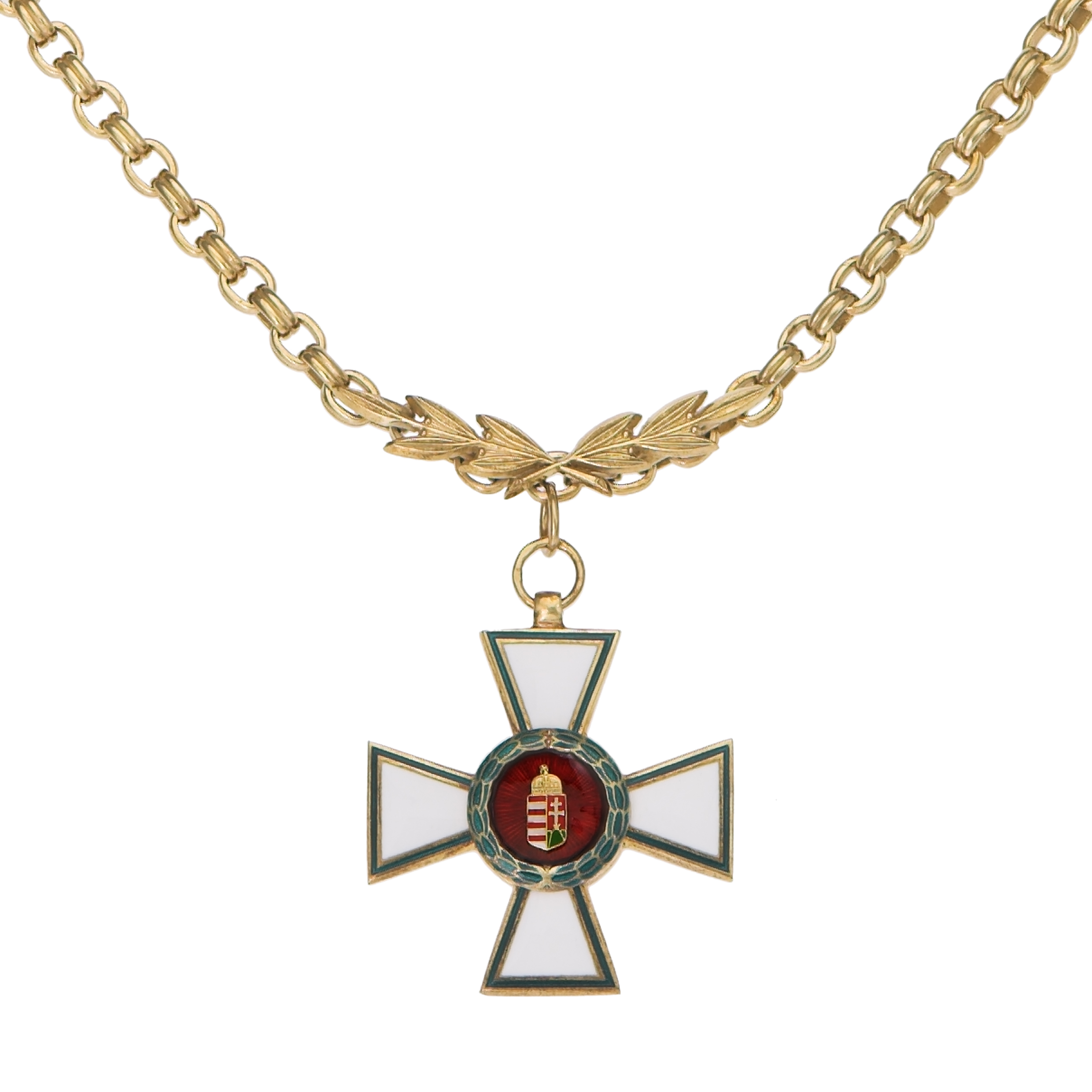
Hungarian Order of Merit

Pásztor was referred to as "Mr. Hockey" in Hungary, and was also known as "Gyuri bacsi" (Uncle Gyuri). He retired from international hockey duty in 1994, and was made an honorary member of the IIHF in the same year. In 2001, he was inducted into the builder category of the IIHF Hall of Fame in Toronto. He was the first Hungarian so honored by the IIHF, and was later joined by countrymen László Schell and Gábor Ocskay. In 1998, he received the Hungarian Order of Merit of Sport.

In 2003, he was made an honorary member of the Hungarian Olympic Committee, and was made an officer of the Hungarian Order of Merit. He was one of the inaugural group of inductees into the Hungarian Ice Hockey Hall of Fame announced during the 2011 IIHF World Championship Division I Group A tournament hosted in Budapest. He attended its inauguration at the City Park Ice Rink, on 24 February 2012. Pásztor was also an honorary president of the Hungarian Ice Hockey Association.

Pásztor received the Fair Play Lifetime Achievement Award in 2008. The HIHF established the Pásztor György Prize in 2017, given annually for recognition of leadership. In 2017, Pásztor received the Pro Homine Nobile Award from the Hungarian Chamber of Pharmacists.

== Personal life ==
Pásztor was born to a family of pharmacists, including his brother. Pásztor enjoyed sailing in the summer as a youth, and spending time at Lake Balaton. During his hockey career, he noted that many great Soviet Union hockey players also sailed as a secondary sport.

During the siege of Budapest in December 1944, medical and pharmaceutical students of Pázmány Péter Catholic University were sent to Germany to continue their university studies. With the help of his brother working in a senior position at the Hungarian embassy, Pásztor helped rescue nearly one thousand students and their professors, and return them to Hungary in October 1945. He was interned by the Mátyás Rákosi regime as a "dangerous person who had left for the West", then served two years of forced labor, before completing his studies in 1948.

Pásztor was a pharmacist in his professional career. and worked in Budapest from 1961 to 1964 after retiring as a player. Despite being educated in medicines, he preferred to use brandy at bed time to fight the common cold.

Pásztor regularly followed Hungarian hockey events, often attending championships and tournaments. In an interview given to the Hungarian Telegraphic Office, he stated that he received congratulations on the current success of the Hungarian national team, even though he was retired. He enjoyed the annual OB I bajnokság championships, the MOL Liga finals, and the Hungarian Cup of hockey. He was also a fan of Alba Volán, and felt that they are the strength of the Hungarian national team.

Pásztor had been married for 41 years when his wife died. His father and older brother were also pharmacists by trade. His daughter Beatrix Aruna Pásztor is in the film industry in the United States. She was born on his 35th birthday (2 March 1958), and is a graduate of the Hungarian Academy of Applied Arts, a member of the Costume Designers Guild, and is associated with The Gersh Agency.

Pásztor died on 22 August 2022, at age 99.
