= 2011 European Speed Skating Championships =

International speed skating competition

European Speed Skating Championships
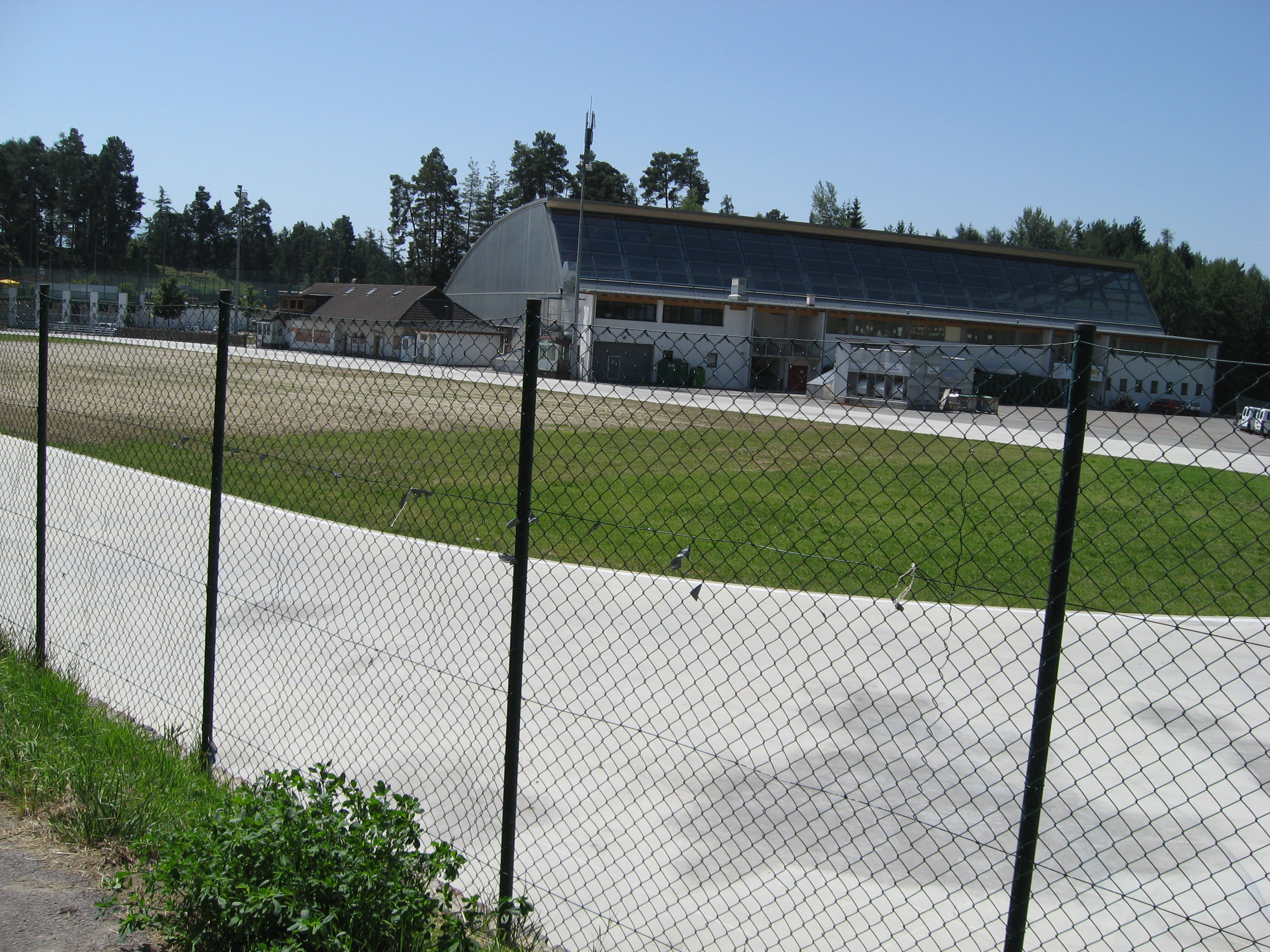
- Arena Ritten in Collalbo in summer
- Venue: Collalbo, Italy
- Dates: 7–9 January 2011
- Competitors: Men 29; Women 23

Medalist men
1st place, gold medalist(s)		Ivan Skobrev	RUS
2nd place, silver medalist(s)		Jan Blokhuijsen	NED
3rd place, bronze medalist(s)		Koen Verweij	NED

Medalist women
1st place, gold medalist(s)		Martina Sáblíková	CZE
2nd place, silver medalist(s)		Ireen Wüst	NED
3rd place, bronze medalist(s)		Marrit Leenstra	NED

The 2011 European Speed Skating Championships were held in Collalbo, Italy, from 7 to 9 January 2011.

== Men's championships ==
=== Day 1 ===
==== 500 metre ====
Place	Athlete	Country	Time
1st place, gold medalist(s)	Konrad Niedźwiedzki	Poland	36.04
2nd place, silver medalist(s)	Jan Blokhuijsen	Netherlands	36.33
3rd place, bronze medalist(s)	Koen Verweij	Netherlands	36.56
4	Håvard Bøkko	Norway	36.65
5	Ivan Skobrev	Russia	36.67

==== 5000 metre ====
Place	Athlete	Country	Time
1st place, gold medalist(s)	Ivan Skobrev	Russia	6:30.01
2nd place, silver medalist(s)	Koen Verweij	Netherlands	6:30.49
3rd place, bronze medalist(s)	Wouter olde Heuvel	Netherlands	6:31.14
4	Jan Blokhuijsen	Netherlands	6:32.21
5	Håvard Bøkko	Norway	6:32.70

=== Day 2 ===
==== 1500 metre ====
Place	Athlete	Country	Time
1st place, gold medalist(s)	Håvard Bøkko	Norway	1:52.12
2nd place, silver medalist(s)	Ivan Skobrev	Russia	1:52.52
3rd place, bronze medalist(s)	Wouter olde Heuvel	Netherlands	1:52.72
4	Zbigniew Bródka	Poland	1:52.89
5	Jan Blokhuijsen	Netherlands	1:52.95

=== Day 3 ===
==== 10000 metre ====
Place	Athlete	Country	Time
1st place, gold medalist(s)	Ivan Skobrev	Russia	13:39.80
2nd place, silver medalist(s)	Wouter olde Heuvel	Netherlands	13:40.18
3rd place, bronze medalist(s)	Jan Blokhuijsen	Netherlands	13:41.45
4	Koen Verweij	Netherlands	13:47.79
5	Håvard Bøkko	Norway	13:51.16

=== Allround results ===
Place	Athlete	Country	500 m	5000 m	1500 m	10000 m	Points
1st place, gold medalist(s)	Ivan Skobrev	Russia	36.67 (5)	6:30.01 (1)	1:52.52 (2)	13:39.80 (1)	154.167
2nd place, silver medalist(s)	Jan Blokhuijsen	Netherlands	36.33 (2)	6:32.21 (4)	1:52.95 (5)	13:41.44 (3)	154.273
3rd place, bronze medalist(s)	Koen Verweij	Netherlands	36.56 (3)	6:30.49 (2)	1:53.07 (6)	13:47.79 (4)	154.688
4	Wouter olde Heuvel	Netherlands	37.12 (9)	6:31.14 (3)	1:52.72 (3)	13:40.18 (2)	154.816
5	Håvard Bøkko	Norway	36.65 (4)	6:32.70 (5)	1:52.12 (1)	13:51.16 (5)	154.851
6	Sverre Lunde Pedersen	Norway	37.17 (10)	6:38.12 (7)	1:53.85 (8)	14:16.16 (6)	157.740
7	Alexis Contin	France	37.76 (17)	6:39.08 (8)	1:53.99 (9)	14:16.62 (7)	158.495
8	Konrad Niedźwiedzki	Poland	36.04 (1)	6:54.67 (17)	1:54.06 (12)	14:30.75 (10)	159.064
9	Pavel Baynov	Russia	36.96 (6)	6:49.74 (15)	1:53.76 (7)	14:25.72 (9)	159.140
10	Henrik Christiansen	Norway	38.20 (22)	6:41.21 (9)	1:54.62 (14)	14:17.24 (8)	159.389
11	Renz Rotteveel	Netherlands	37.37 (13)	6:37.51 (6)	1:55.90 (23)	14:33.83 (11)	159.445
12	Enrico Fabris	Italy	37.23 (11)	6:43.06 (10)	1:54.69 (16)	DNS	
NQ13	Zbigniew Bródka	Poland	37.05 (8)	6:56.02 (20)	1:52.89 (4)		
NQ14	Robert Lehmann	Germany	37.28 (12)	6:48.57 (13)	1:55.18 (21)		
NQ15	Joel Eriksson	Sweden	36.98 (7)	6:55.11 (19)	1:54.14 (13)		
NQ16	Haralds Silovs	Latvia	37.38 (14)	6:48.64 (14)	1:55.03 (20)		
NQ17	Luca Stefani	Italy	37.79 (19)	6:47.71 (11)	1:54.83 (17)		
NQ18	Roland Cieslak	Poland	38.02 (21)	6:51.85 (16)	1:54.83 (17)		
NQ19	Bart Swings	Belgium	38.97 (26)	6:48.09 (12)	1:53.99 (9)		
NQ20	Vitaly Mikhailov	Belarus	37.43 (15)	7:00.63 (25)	1:54.88 (19)		
NQ21	Tobias Schneider	Germany	37.81 (20)	6:57.58 (21)	1:54.68 (15)		
NQ22	Milan Sáblik	Czech Republic	37.75 (16)	6:58.24 (23)	1:55.30 (22)		
NQ23	Benjamin Macé	France	38.46 (24)	6:59.31 (24)	1:54.05 (11)		
NQ24	Marco Cognini	Italy	38.45 (23)	6:55.04 (18)	1:56.94 (24)		
NQ25	Roger Schneider	Switzerland	39.32 (27)	6:57.60 (22)			
NQ26	Daniel Friberg	Sweden	37.76 (17)	7:13.82 (28)			
NQ27	Christian Pichler	Austria	39.36 (28)	7:02.42 (27)			
NQ28	Marian Cristian Ion	Romania	39.59 (29)	7:01.23 (26)			
NQ29	Niko Räsänen	Finland	38.92 (25)	7:24.57 (29)			

NQ = Not qualified for the 10000 m (only the best 12 are qualified)
DNS = Did not start

Source: ISU

== Women's championships ==
=== Day 2 ===
==== 500 metre ====
Place	Athlete	Country	Time
1st place, gold medalist(s)	Karolína Erbanová	Czech Republic	39.29
2nd place, silver medalist(s)	Marrit Leenstra	Netherlands	39.98
3rd place, bronze medalist(s)	Yekaterina Lobysheva	Russia	40.13
4	Yuliya Skokova	Russia	40.27
5	Martina Sáblíková	Czech Republic	40.31

==== 3000 metre ====
Place	Athlete	Country	Time
1st place, gold medalist(s)	Martina Sáblíková	Czech Republic	4:11.36
2nd place, silver medalist(s)	Ireen Wüst	Netherlands	4:13.40
3rd place, bronze medalist(s)	Marrit Leenstra	Netherlands	4:17.66
4	Diane Valkenburg	Netherlands	4:19.51
5	Mari Hemmer	Norway	4:20.95

=== Day 3 ===
==== 1500 metre ====
Place	Athlete	Country	Time
1st place, gold medalist(s)	Ireen Wüst	Netherlands	1:59.61
2nd place, silver medalist(s)	Martina Sáblíková	Czech Republic	2:00.37
3rd place, bronze medalist(s)	Marrit Leenstra	Netherlands	2:00.95
4	Diane Valkenburg	Netherlands	2:01.49
5	Jorien Voorhuis	Netherlands	2:02.04

==== 5000 metre ====
Place	Athlete	Country	Time
1st place, gold medalist(s)	Martina Sáblíková	Czech Republic	7:07.78
2nd place, silver medalist(s)	Ireen Wüst	Netherlands	7:18.70
3rd place, bronze medalist(s)	Diane Valkenburg	Netherlands	7:24.69
4	Mari Hemmer	Norway	7:26.62
5	Anna Rokita	Austria	7:27.40

=== Allround results ===
Place	Athlete	Country	500 m	3000 m	1500 m	5000 m	Points
1st place, gold medalist(s)	Martina Sáblíková	Czech Republic	40.31 (5)	4:11.36 (1)	2:00.37 (2)	7:07.78 (1)	165.104
2nd place, silver medalist(s)	Ireen Wüst	Netherlands	40.49 (6)	4:13.40 (2)	1:59.61 (1)	7:18.70 (2)	166.463
3rd place, bronze medalist(s)	Marrit Leenstra	Netherlands	39.98 (2)	4:17.66 (3)	2:00.95 (3)	7:28.06 (6)	168.045
4	Diane Valkenburg	Netherlands	41.05 (10)	4:19.51 (4)	2:01.49 (4)	7:24.69 (3)	169.266
5	Jorien Voorhuis	Netherlands	40.56 (7)	4:21.04 (6)	2:02.04 (5)	7:28.48 (7)	169.594
6	Yekaterina Lobysheva	Russia	40.13 (3)	4:24.08 (8)	2:02.70 (6)	7:36.44 (10)	170.687
7	Mari Hemmer	Norway	41.71 (14)	4:20.95 (5)	2:05.84 (14)	7:26.62 (4)	171.816
8	Ida Njåtun	Norway	41.20 (12)	4:24.29 (10)	2:05.45 (12)	&:35.37 (9)	172.151
9	Luiza Zlotkovska	Poland	41.20 (12)	4:25.15 (12)	2:05.43 (11)	7:31.49 (8)	172.350
10	Karolína Erbanová	Czech Republic	39.29 (1)	4:31.54 (19)	2:03.88 (7)	7:56.37 (12)	173.476
11	Anna Rokita	Austria	41.98 (15)	4:23.21 (7)	2:09.82 (19)	7:27.40 (5)	173.861
12	Yuliya Skokova	Russia	40.27 (4)	4:31.44 (18)	2:04.05 (8)	7:53.77 (11)	174.237
NQ13	Hege Bøkko	Norway	40.56 (7)	4:30.13 (17)	2:04.85 (10)		
NQ14	Isabell Ost	Germany	42.16 (18)	4:24.98 (11)	2:05.58 (13)		
NQ15	Jennifer Bay	Germany	42.08 (17)	4:24.15 (9)	2:07.01 (16)		
NQ16	Karolina Domanska-Ksyt	Poland	41.52 (13)	4:32.93 (20)	2:06.90 (15)		
NQ17	Natalia Czerwonka	Poland	41.15 (11)	4:29.46 (14)	2:10.04 (20)		
NQ18	Bente Kraus	Germany	43.20 (21)	4:29.49 (15)	2:09.10 (18)		
NQ19	Katerina Novotná	Czech Republic	42.27 (20)	4:36.09 (21)	2:09.00 (17)		
NQ20	Tatyana Mikhailova	Belarus	41.98 (15)	4:38.82 (22)	2:10.17 (21)		
NQ21	Cathrine Grage	Denmark	44.55 (22)	4:28.66 (12)	2:12.30 (22)		
NQ22	Ágota Tóth	Hungary	42.25 (19)	4:43.83 (23)	2:15.28 (23)		
NQ23	Yekaterina Shikhova	Russia	1:02.73 (23)	4:29.59 (16)	2:04.40 (9)		

NQ = Not qualified for the 5000 m (only the best 12 are qualified)
DNS = Did not start

Source: ISU

== Rules ==
All participating skaters were allowed to skate the first three distances; 12 skaters may taken part on the fourth distance. These 12 skaters were determined by taking the standings on the longest of the first three distances, as well as the samalog standings after three distances, and comparing these lists as follows:

1. Skaters among the top 12 on both lists were qualified.
2. To make up a total of 12, skaters were then added in order of their best rank on either list. Samalog standings took precedence over the longest-distance standings in the event of a tie.

== See also ==
- 2011 World Allround Speed Skating Championships
