= Hungarian Ice Hockey Hall of Fame =

Coordinates: 47.50319°N 19.09031°E

The Hungarian Ice Hockey Hall of Fame, which honours players, coaches, referees and other individuals who have made important contributions to the sport of hockey in Hungary, was founded and the first members were inducted on 16 April 2011. The awards were given by International Ice Hockey Federation president René Fasel one day prior to the beginning of the 2011 IIHF World Championship Division I, that was held in Budapest, Hungary. A total of 22 prizes were handed over, divided between eleven living legends and as many former stars, who have been deceased and were honoured posthumously.

The memorial of the Hall of Fame members were inaugurated on 24 February 2012 at the City Park Ice Rink, one of the oldest ice rinks in Europe, which renovation finished just two months earlier.

== List of members ==
Living legends

- János Ancsin – player
- László Jakabházy – player, coach
- Csaba Kovács, Sr. – player, vice-president of the Hungarian Ice Hockey Federation
- Péter Kovalcsik – goaltender
- András Mészöly – player
- Gábor Ocskay, Sr. – player, coach, builder
- Antal Palla – player, coach
- György Pásztor – player, sports diplomat, the first Hungarian who was inducted to the IIHF Hall of Fame
- György Raffa – player, coach, leader of the Historical Committee of the Hungarian Ice Hockey Federation
- László Schell – referee, member of the IIHF Hall of Fame
- Viktor Zsitva – player, referee

Posthumous awardees

- Gábor Boróczi – player, coach
- Béla Háray – player
- István Hircsák – goaltender
- Zoltán Jeney – player
- Géza Lator – founder of the Hungarian Ice Hockey Federation
- György Leveles – player
- György Margó – player
- Sándor Miklós – player
- Sándor Minder – player
- Gábor Ocskay, Jr. – player, captain of the Hungarian team that won promotion to the top-tier World Championship in 2008
- László Rajkai – player, coach

== See also ==
- List of members of the IIHF Hall of Fame
- IIHF Hall of Fame
