= Ferre Spruyt =

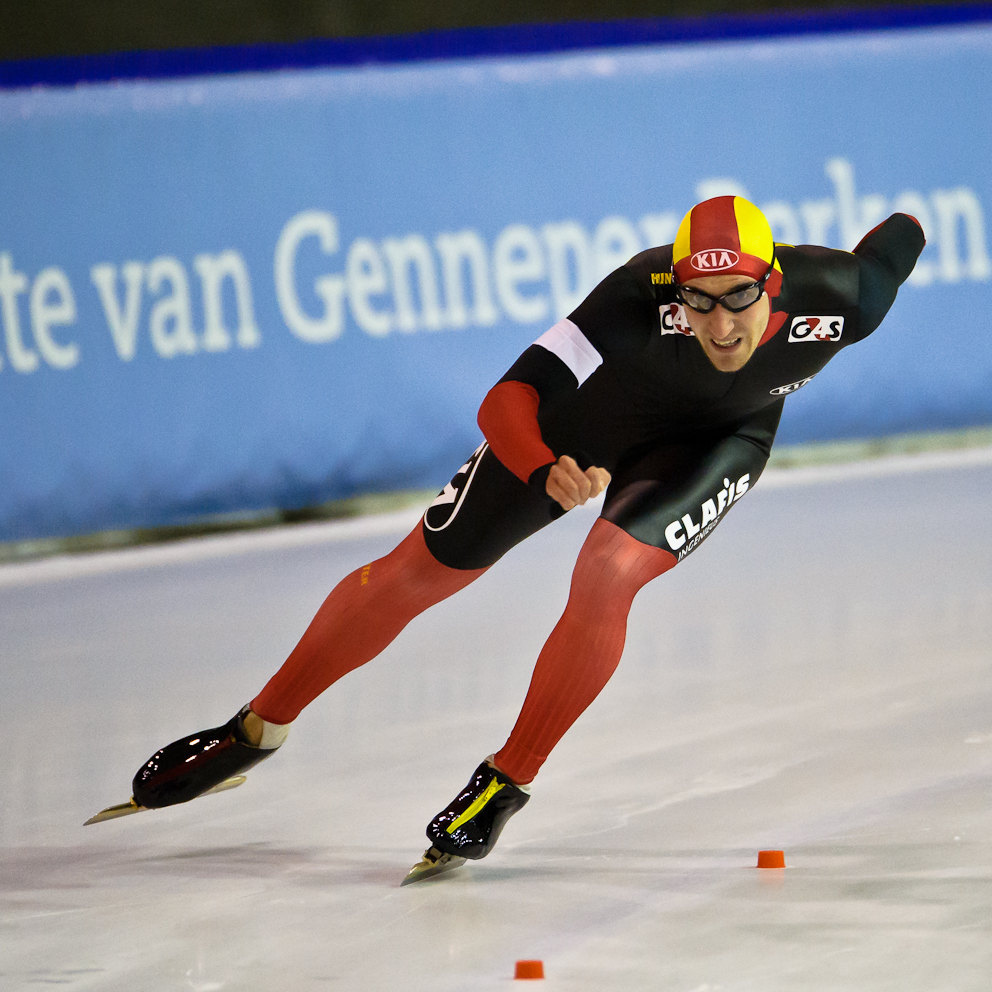
Ferre Spruyt in 2012

Ferre Spruyt (born 9 April 1986, in Leuven, Belgium) is a Belgian speed skater (inline skating & ice), and multiple European and World Champion. Together with Bart Swings and Maarten Swings, he forms "Team Stressless", the first Belgian professional top speed skating (inline and on ice) team.

== Inline speedskating Top results ==
- National Champion men's speed inline skating 1 000 m (19 May 12 Brugge)
- National Champion men's speed inline skating (on the road) 10.000 m Fond/elimination (20 May 12 Elewijt)
- World Champion men's speed inline skating (on the road) 5 000 m relay race (September 2012 San Benedetto Del Tronto - Italy)
- 2011 European Champion men's speed inline skating (on the road) 5 000 m relay race
- 2010 European Champion men's speed inline skating (on the road) 5 000 m relay race
- 2009 European Champion men's speed inline skating (on the road) 3 000 m relay race
- 2009 European Champion men's speed inline skating (on the road) 5 000 m relay race
