= Géza Kresz =

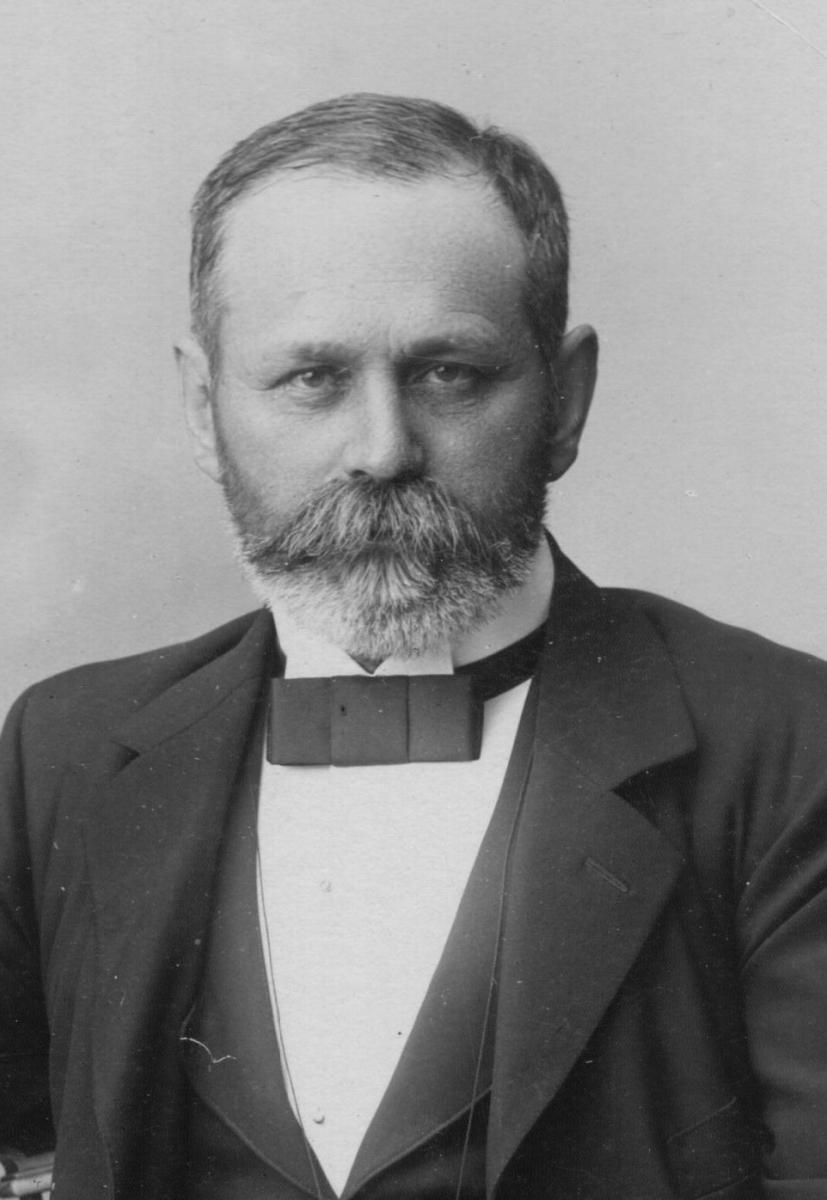
- Born: 30 August 1846; Pest, Kingdom of Hungary, Austrian Empire
- Died: 10 April 1901 (aged 54); Budapest, Kingdom of Hungary, Austria-Hungary
- Education: University of Pest
- Known for: founding the Budapest Voluntary Ambulance Society, organizing the ambulance system in Budapest

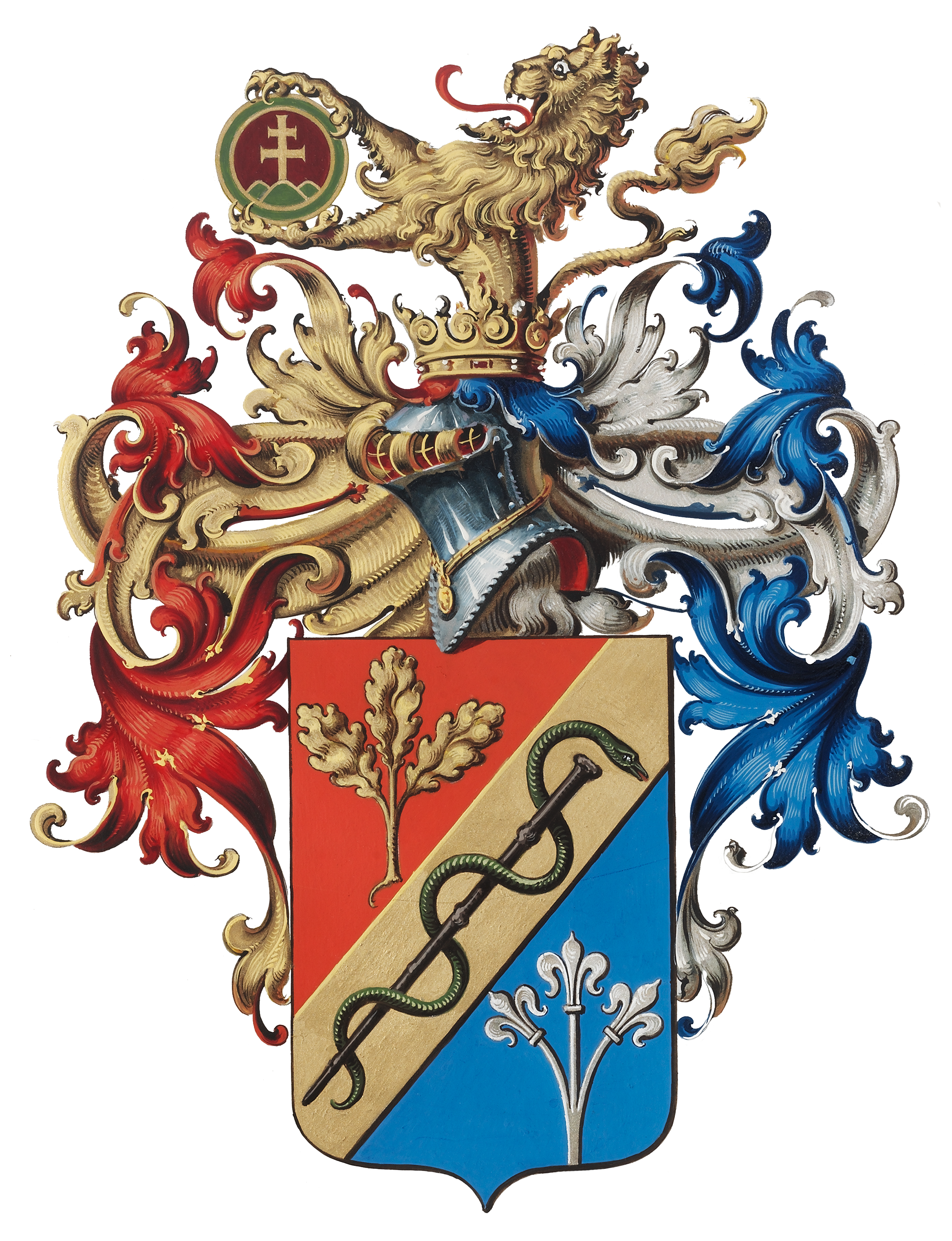
Crest of Géza Kresz

Géza Kresz of Szemlőhegy (30 August 1846 – 10 April 1901) was a Hungarian physician, founder of the Budapest Voluntary Ambulance Society and the Pest Skating Club.

== Early life ==
Kresz was born in Pest to Carl Kresz, a son of a fruiterer from Merseburg, who fled to Hungary to avoid impressment, and a daughter of a bookseller. He was the youngest of the six children of the couple. He studied for physician and earned his medical degree in 1871 in the University of Pest.

== Work ==
Kresz first worked as a general practitioner and later became a health officer in the 5th district of Budapest. In 1876 the law for the organization of ambulance institutions was enacted, by that it became the responsibility of the police, thus the central district police stations were operating as the first ambulance stations. However, this system could not cope with the increasing number of tasks in the period of industrialization, and to be able to carry out the rescue missions, Géza Kresz founded the Budapest Voluntary Ambulance Society (Budapesti Önkéntes Mentő Egyesület, BÖME) in 1887, utilizing the model that was used in Vienna since a few years.

In the coming years he established the organized ambulance system, actively participated in the elimination of cholera and organized the supply of Budapest with breast milk.

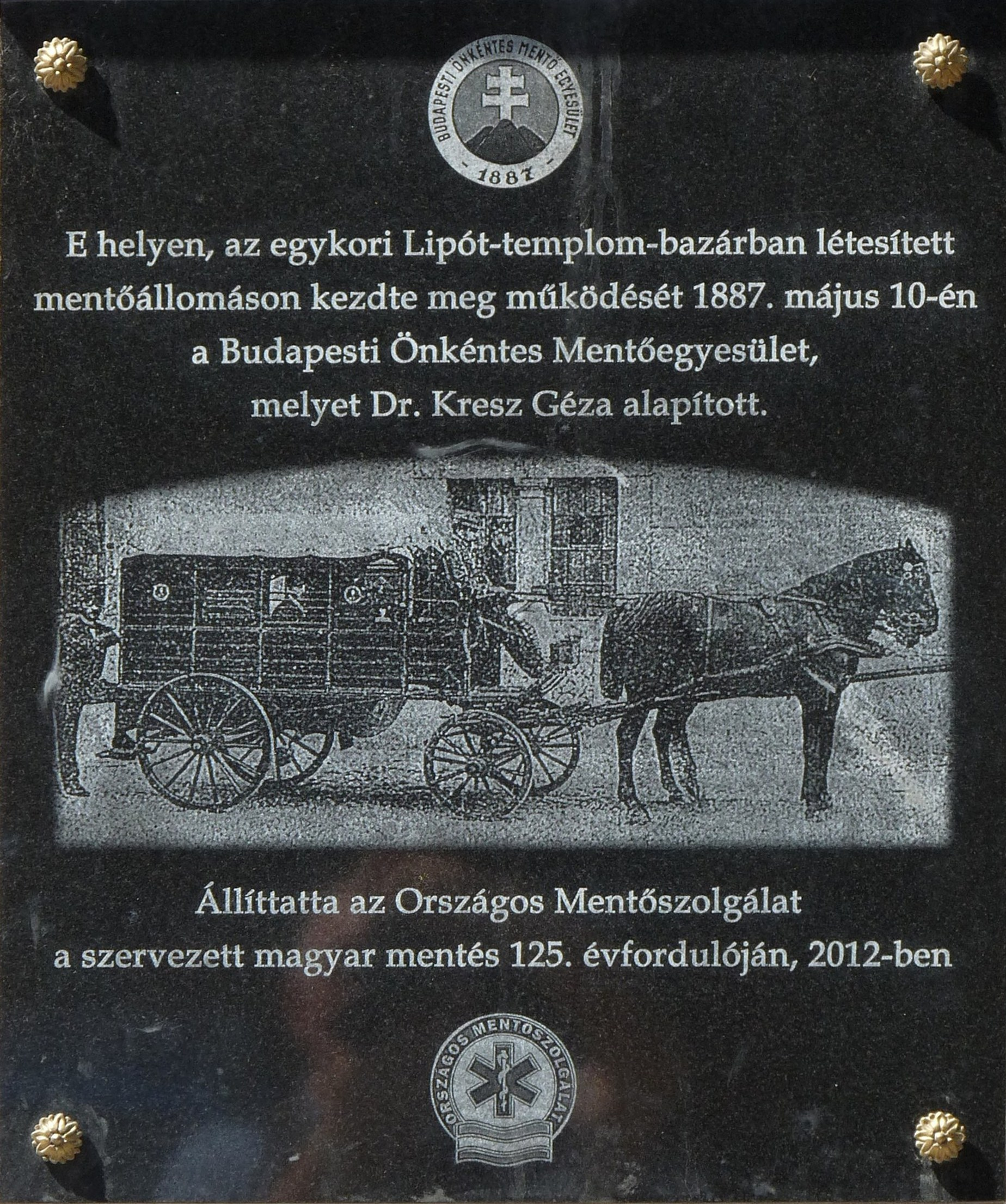
Commemorative plaque on the southern railing of Saint Stephen's Basilica remembering the 125th anniversary of the founding of BÖME.

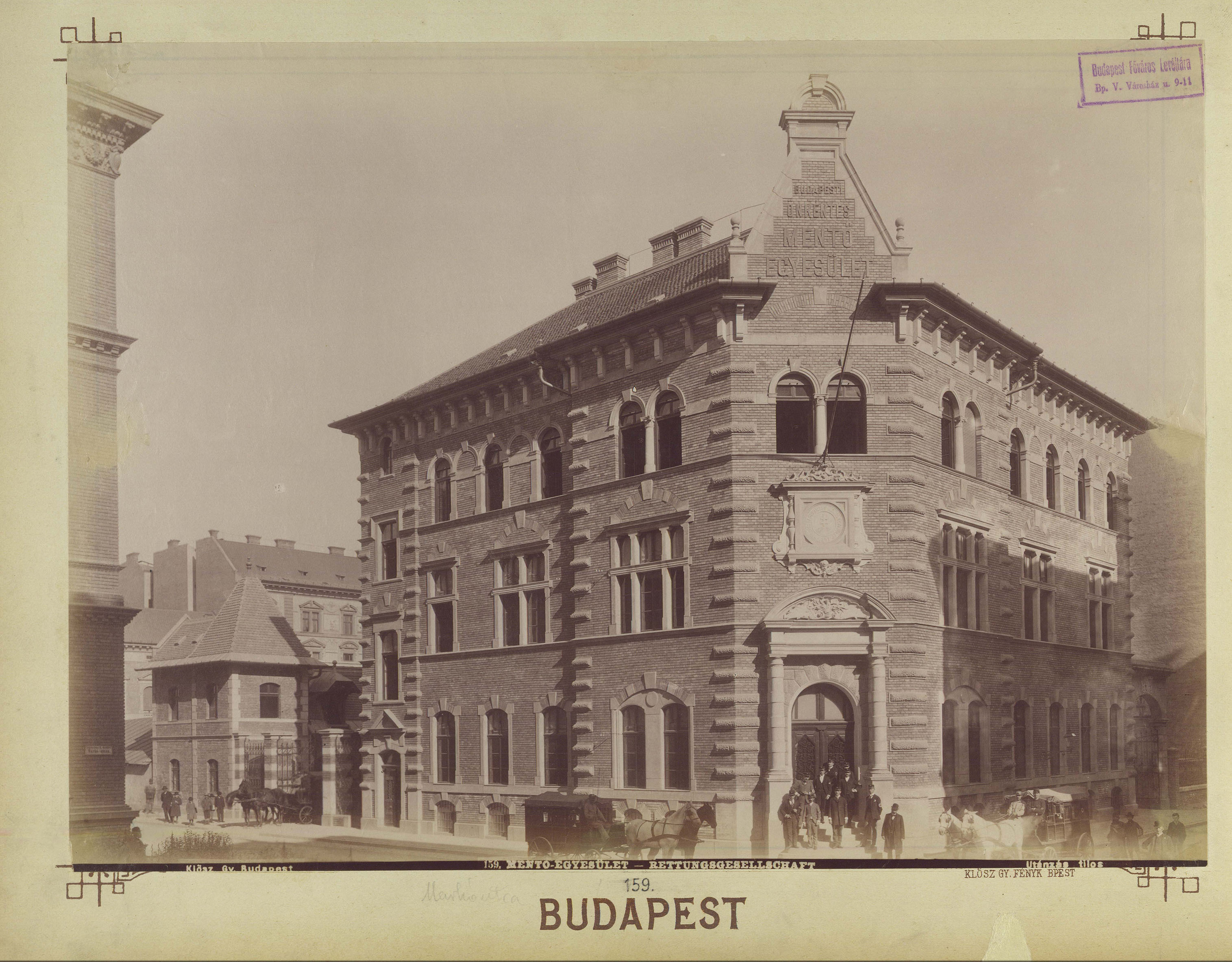
The Ambulance Palace in 1900.

In 1890 the Ambulance Palace (Mentőpalota) - designed by Zsigmond Quittner - was erected on the proposal of Kresz. This was the first building in Europe that was built as an ambulance station and it still serves as the headquarters of the National Ambulance. The building process took one and a half years and was financed by the donations of wealthy citizens. In the yard were found the stables with hayloft and the horse-drawn ambulance coaches. Kresz also had his residence in the Ambulance Palace, where he lived with his family on the second floor. The second wing of the building was handed over in the second part of the 1890s. The bedrooms of the residential employees, the storage rooms, and the Ambulance Museum - established by Kresz - were placed here. Kresz collected and systematized the instruments and other memorabilia to create this special museum, which is still unique in Europe.

As a devoted fan of ice skating, Kresz played pioneer role in popularizing the sport in Hungary. On his initiation was founded the Pest Skating Club (Pesti Korcsolyázó Egylet) in 1869 and he set up the first skating rink, the City Park Ice Rink, on the frozen lake of the City Park. Ice skating quickly became a beloved sport, which is shown that the number of skating club members grew from 35 to 432 in the first year.

== Later life and legacy ==
During the Millennial Exhibition in 1896, Kresz made an X-ray image of Franz Joseph's right hand.

On 1 November 1885 he was awarded with the Order of Franz Joseph (Knight Class).

For the founding of the Budapest Voluntary Ambulance Society, he earned the title royal councilor on 3 January 1897.

In the 1900s a series of ambulance stations were created in Hungarian cities and villages, for them the example to follow was the Budapest Voluntary Ambulance Society. For his merits he was ennobled by Franz Joseph on 24 December 1900 and was given the name de Szemlőhegy (Szemlőhegyi). In his crest is seen a lion that holds the coat of arms of the National Ambulance, while on the shield are three oak leaves, symbolizing his sons, and three lilies, symbolizing his daughters.

He died on 10 April 1901 and was buried in the National Graveyard in Budapest. The Ambulance Museum has been renamed in the honor of Kresz, a street in Budapest bears his name and a plaque remembers him by the Ambulance Palace.

The minor planet no. 242523, discovered on 5 January 2005 is named after him.

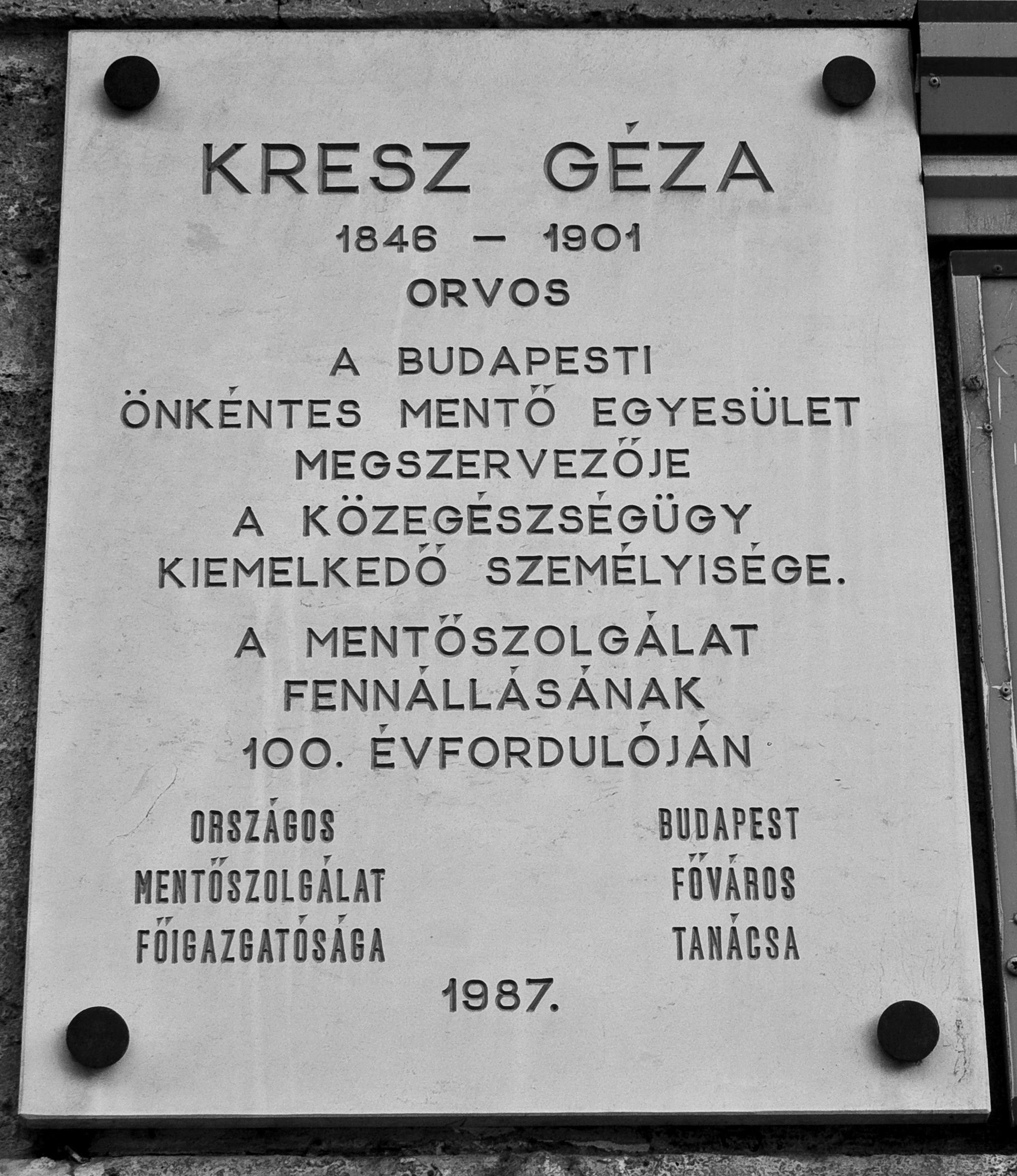
His memorial plaque in the street named after him.

Endre Liber, deputy-major of Budapest speaks at the inauguration of Géza Kresz's memorial plaque, on 19 October 1935.

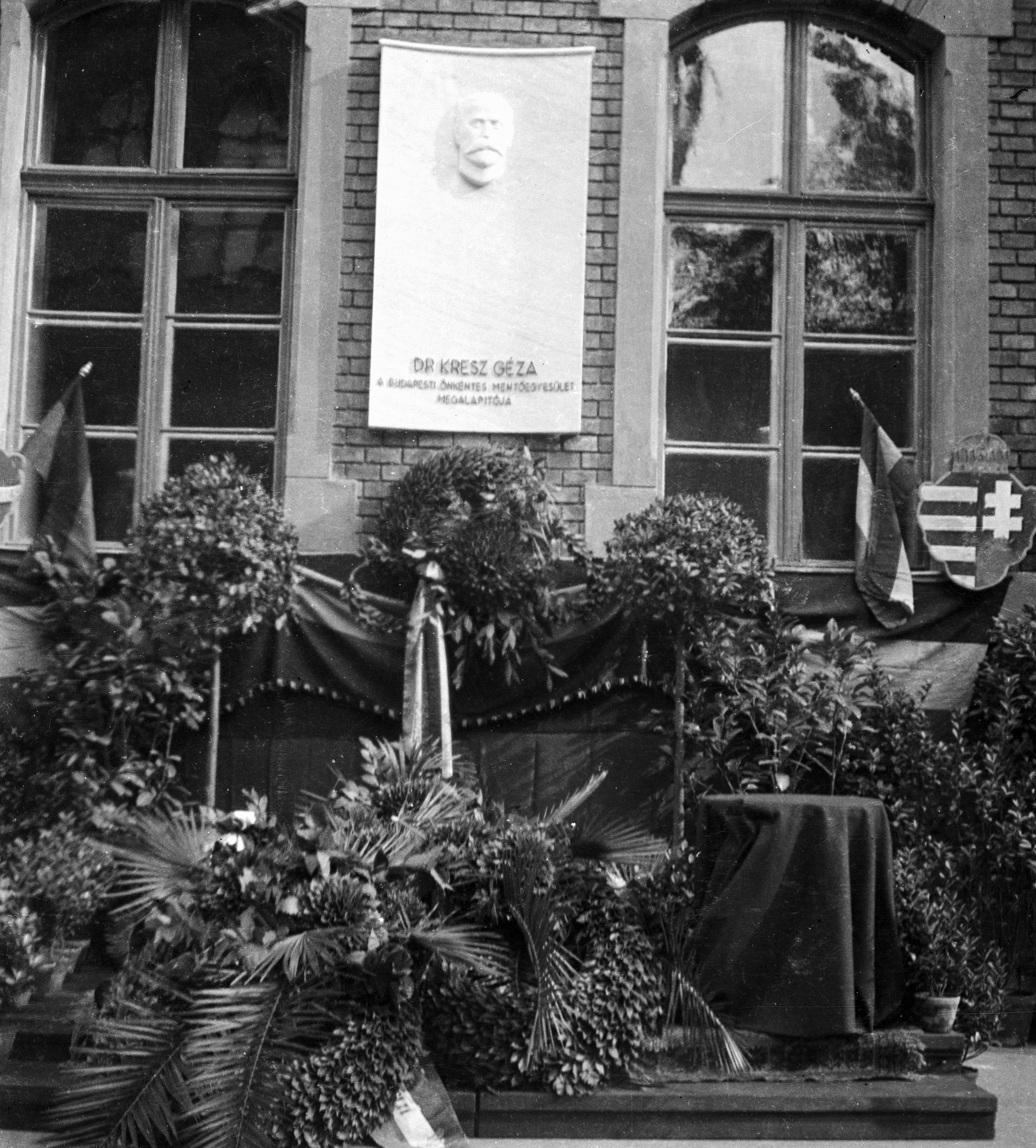
Géza Kresz's memorial plaque on the Bihari János street-front of the Ambulance Palace after the inauguration (19 October 1935)

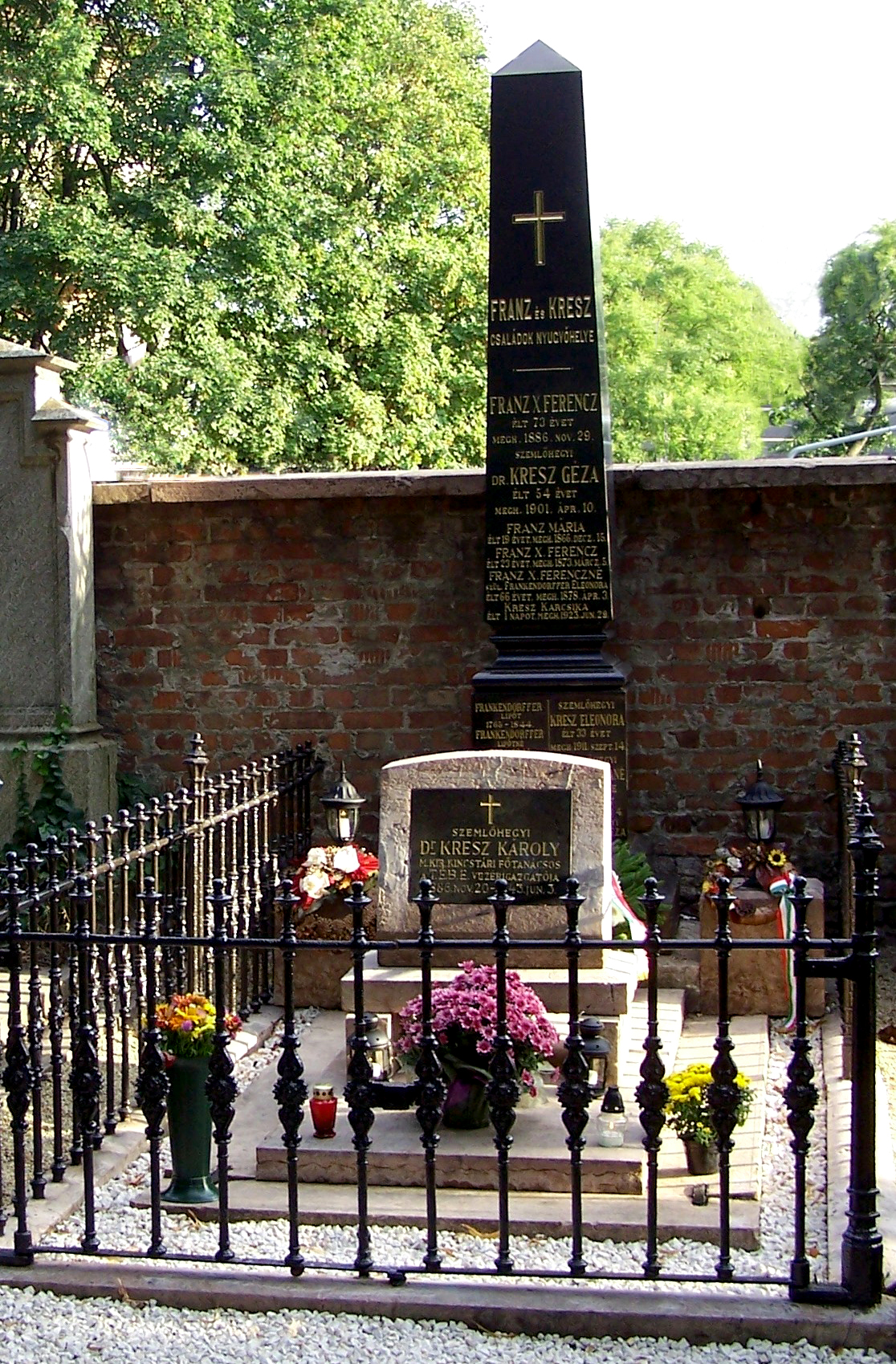
Kresz's grave at the Kerepesi Cemetery

== Publications ==
- Elmeállapotok megvizsgálása. (Államorvos 1879/3.)
- Miként lehetne Budapest fővárosát jó, egészséges és megbízható tejjel s gyermek-tejjel ellátni? (Budapest, 1883)
- A tuberculosis és annak pusztítása ellen való védekezés, tekintettel hazánk és a főváros közegészségi viszonyaira. (Budapest, 1884)
- Gyakorlati tapasztalatok a berlini közegészségi kiállításon. (1884)
- Miként gátoljuk meg a gümőkór kifejlődését. (Államorvos 1884/7.)
- Első segély rögtöni baleseteknél az orvos megérkezéséig. (Budapest, 1884)
- Adatok a croup, álcroup és a diphtheritis kezeléséhez, fő tekintettel a meleg gőzök ujabb sikeres helyi alkalmazására. (Orvosi Hetilap 1885/18.)
- A mentés és első segély szervezése a fővárosban. (Budapest, 1885)
- A Budapesti Önkéntes Mentő-Egyesület uj központi állomása. (Budapest, 1891)
- A cholera és az ellene való védekezés. (Budapest, 1892)
- A Budapesti Önkéntes Mentő-Egyesület 1887–1893. (Budapest, 1894)
