= László Schell =

Hungarian ice hockey official (born 1948)

- Born: 9 February 1948 (age 77); Budapest, Second Hungarian Republic
- Occupation: Ice hockey official
- Years active: 1967 to 1990
- Known for: Ice Hockey World Championships
- Awards: IIHF Hall of Fame, Hungarian Ice Hockey Hall of Fame

László Schell (born 9 February 1948) is a Hungarian retired ice hockey official. He officiated more than 1,500 games in Hungary between 1967 and 1990, and was one of the busiest International Ice Hockey Federation (IIHF) officials from 1977 to 1982 at the Ice Hockey World Championships. His career was recognized with induction into both the IIHF Hall of Fame, and Hungarian Ice Hockey Hall of Fame.

== Early life ==
Schell was born 9 February 1948 in Budapest, and grew up in the Zugló district. He played hockey within the Budapesti VSC, but later realized it was not his strength. He stopped playing at the same time the Hungarian Ice Sports Association held a course for ice hockey officials.

== Referee career ==
Schell became a certified referee, and went on to officiate more than 1,500 games in the Hungarian national championship between 1967 and 1990.

Schell began officiating matches outside of Hungary in 1973, and was chosen by the International Ice Hockey Federation (IIHF) to make his debut at the Ice Hockey World Championships in 1977. In a six-year span from 1977 to 1982, he was one of the busiest IIHF linesmen, officiating 41 games in the top division of the Ice Hockey World Championships. In 1977, he set an unofficial IIHF record of 22 World Championships matches in a year, when he officiated 11 games at the A-division of the 1977 World Ice Hockey Championships in Vienna, and then another 11 games at the B-division in Tokyo. He was later assigned to another 30 World Championships matches combined at the 1978 World Ice Hockey Championships in Prague, the 1979 World Ice Hockey Championships in Moscow and the 1982 Ice Hockey World Championships in Helsinki. He also officiated the final games in 1978 and 1982.

Schell regretted that he never officiated at the Winter Olympic Games. He never felt intimidated or afraid even when there were only two officials on the ice, as he was able to tune out the crowd.

== Later life and honors ==
Schell later worked in real estate after retiring from ice hockey in 1990, and participated in recreational big game hunting. He was inducted into the IIHF Hall of Fame on 5 May 2009 in Bern, becoming its second Hungarian inductee after György Pásztor in 2001. Schell was later inducted into the Hungarian Ice Hockey Hall of Fame, in the inaugural class of 2011.
