= Géza Lator =

Hungarian ice hockey player (1889–1976)

- Born: 3 February 1889 Máramarossziget, Austria-Hungary
- Died: 15 December 1976 (aged 87)
- Position: Right wing
- Played for: Budapesti Korcsolyázó Egylet
- National team: Hungary
- Playing career: 1908–1932

Géza Lator (3 February 1889 — 15 December 1976) was a Hungarian ice hockey player. He played for the Hungarian national team at the 1928 Winter Olympics and several World Championships.
