= Ágota Lykovcán =

Hungarian long track speed skater (born 1987)

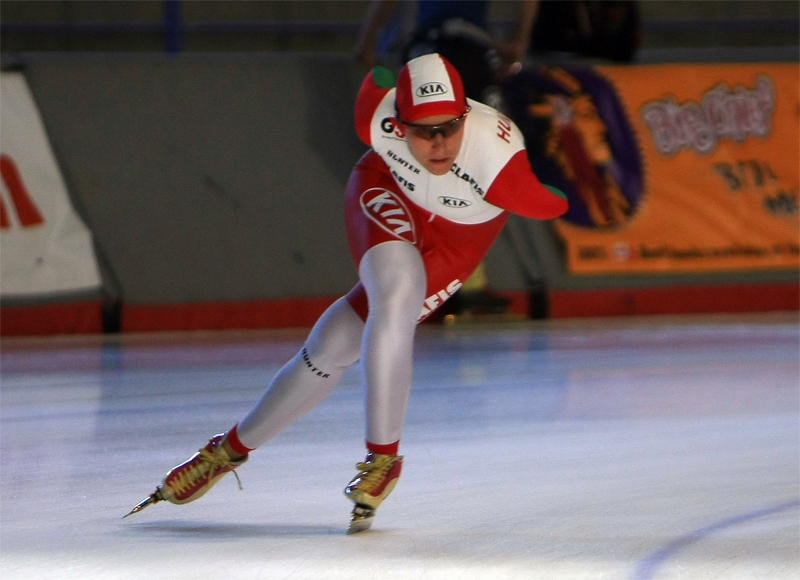
- Ágota Lykovcán

Personal information
- Born: 2 September 1987 (age 38) Budapest, Hungary
- Height: 1.73 m (5 ft 8 in)
- Weight: 68 kg (150 lb; 10.7 st)
- Website: www.agotalykovcan.com

Sport
- Country: Hungary
- Sport: Speed skating

Ágota Lykovcán (née Tóth; born 2 September 1987) is a Hungarian long track speed skater who participates in international competitions. She was previously known as Ágota Tóth, but after she got married on 10 November 2012, she took her husband's surname. Lykovcán is the current holder of the Hungarian record on 500 metres.

== Skating career ==
Lykovcán's father, a former world champion weightlifter, showed her the beauty of the sport and took her to the City Park Ice Rink in Budapest. First she did figure skating but quickly switched to speed skating when she was 10. At her first event after one month she finished at the first place and then she had broken all national records in every age group and still holds them. Thanks to her educator coach Zsolt Baló, a former speed skater who has competed at four Olympics, Lykovcán qualified for the 2006 Olympics in Turin and earned her first World Cup point in 2003 when she was 16.

After 2006 a break point occurred in her career when her coach moved to Canada with his family and the only ice rink in Hungary closed. Due to the lack of training possibilities, Lykovcán had to train alone mostly abroad for many years to keep up at international level.

In 2011 Lykovcán had the chance to work with Jeremy Wotherspoon at KIA Speed Skating Academy in Inzell. The professional training method resulted in new personal bests, and she qualified to the European Championship, World Cups and Sprint World Championship as well.

Lykovcán prefers shorter distances (500 m, 1000 m, 1500 m), although she competes allround. Her best results have all come from 500 m (WC point 2003, 4th in Junior Worlds) and 1000 m (Olympic qualification 2006).

=== Personal records ===
Personal records
Women's speed skating
Event	Result	Date	Location	Notes
500 m	39.17	9 November 2013	Olympic Oval, Calgary	Current Hungarian record
1000 m	1:18.55	10 November 2013	Olympic Oval, Calgary	
1500 m	2:05.23	6 December 2014	Eisstadion Inzell, Inzell	
3000 m	4:23.75	19 November 2011	Olympic Oval, Calgary	

=== Career highlights ===
World Sprint Championships
2006 - Heerenveen, 35th
2013 - Salt Lake City, 31st
European Allround Championships
2007 - Collalbo, 27th
2008 - Kolomna, 24th
2009 - Heerenveen, 27th
2010 - Hamar, 26th
2011 - Collalbo, 22nd
2012 - Budapest, 22nd
2013 - Heerenveen, 22nd
World Junior Allround Championships
2003 - Kushiro, 32nd
2004 - Roseville, 29th
2005 - Seinäjoki, 27th

National Championships
2001 - Budapest, (bronze) 3rd at sprint
2002 - Budapest, (silver) 2nd at sprint
2003 - Budapest, (bronze) 3rd at allround
2003 - Budapest, (silver) 2nd at sprint
2004 - Budapest, (silver) 2nd at allround
2004 - Budapest, (silver) 2nd at sprint
2005 - Budapest, (gold) 1st at allround
2005 - Budapest, (gold) 1st at sprint
2007 - Budapest, (gold) 1st at allround
2007 - Budapest, (gold) 1st at sprint
2008 - Budapest, (gold) 1st at allround
2008 - Budapest, (gold) 1st at sprint
2012 - Budapest, (gold) 1st at allround
2013 - Budapest, (gold) 1st at allround
