= City Park Ice Rink =

Ice rink in Budapest, Hungary

City Park Ice Rink Városligeti Műjégpálya
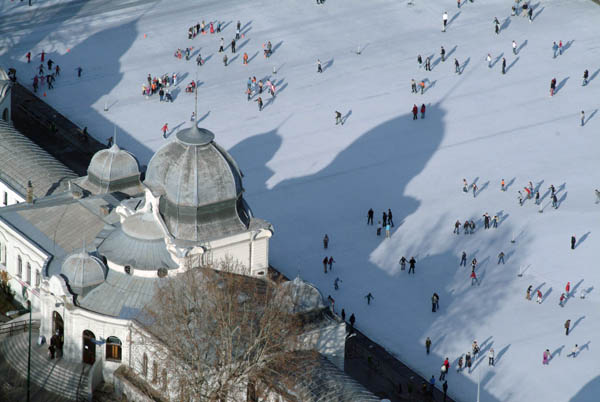
- Aerial view of the skating rink
- Interactive map of City Park Ice Rink; Városligeti Műjégpálya
- Location: City Park, Budapest, Hungary
- Coordinates: 47.5138969°N 19.0801155°E
- Owner: City of Budapest
- Surface: Ice
- Field size: 180x67 metres (bandy and skating rink); 60x30 metres (ice hockey rink)

Construction
- Built: 1869
- Opened: 29 January 1870
- Renovated: 1968, 2011

Tenants
- Budapesti Korcsolyázó Egylet; Hungarian Bandy Federation

Website
- Official website

The City Park Ice Rink (Hungarian: Városligeti Műjégpálya) is a public ice rink located in the City Park of the Hungarian capital Budapest, between the Heroes' Square and the Vajdahunyad Castle. Opened in 1870, it is the World's largest continuous artificial ice rink as well as one of the oldest open-air ice rinks in Europe. In summer months the area is filled up with water to create a pond, which is primarily used for boating, but also hosted several special events, such as the snowball fight world record attempt in 2009 or the Art on Lake exhibition in 2011.

It went through a complete renovation between 2009 and 2011, in which the main building was restored to its 19th-century look. The skating area was expanded to 12,000 square metres (130,000 sq ft) and a standard ice hockey rink was set up as well. The skating rink re-opened on 16 December 2011 and it was the home of the 2012 European Speed Skating Championships from 6 to 8 January.

The memorial of the Hungarian Ice Hockey Hall of Fame is also found at the City Park Ice Rink since its inauguration in February 2012.

== History ==
In the second part of the nineteenth century the pleasant environment of the City Park became a beloved place for relaxation, entertainment and freetime activities. On the City Park Lake boating and rowing were popular sports to practice and during the winter skaters also appeared on the frozen lake.

In the end of 1869, with the guidance of Géza Kresz the Pesti Korcsolyázó Egylet (Skating Association of Pest) was founded, and they also obtained the permission of the city council to create an ice rink on a part of the City Park Lake. A wooden pavilion was built on the shore of the lake as well, where the visitors could warm up and change their skates. The official opening ceremony took place on 29 January 1870 in the presence of Rudolf, Crown Prince of Austria, and skating got underway immediately, with the first ever race held on 2 February. This time the association had only 35 members, which increased to 432 by the end of the year.

The outset of figure skating in Hungary can be dated from 6 January 1871, when Jackson Haines, who is regarded as the father of figure skating, presented his show for the Hungarian audience. He repeated his visit in the next year, due to that figure skating gained ground quickly among Hungarian skaters.

In 1874 the wooden cottage was burnt down, following that a new stable building was erected by the plans of Hungarian secessionist architect Ödön Lechner. On the ground floor was found the changing room and warming room, while on the upstairs was placed the main hall and the music room. For 1879 floodlights were installed to ensure a skating opportunity at nights.

Budapesti Korcsolyázó Egylet, as Pesti Korcsolyázó Egylet was known since the unification of Buda, Pest and Óbuda in 1873, was one of the five founding members of the International Skating Union (ISU) in 1892 and it won the organization rights of the 1895 European Figure Skating Championships, which took place at the City Park Ice Rink.

For 1893 due to the increasing number of the visitors the main building was proved to be too small and was replaced by a bigger neo-baroque style building designed by Imre Francsek.

Beside sport events the skating rink gave home of ice feasts and shows. The fortieth anniversary of the foundation of the Pesti Korcsolyázó Egylet in 1909 was celebrated with a costume festival, in which the coronation of Matthias I of Hungary was performed, that originally took place on the frozen Danube. The king was personated by Count Károly Andrássy. In the same year in the Városliget was held the 1909 World Figure Skating Championships, the first ever World event in Hungary, in which local skater Lily Kronberger triumphed.

Because of the World War I skating life experienced a setback, as skaters began to return to the City Park Ice Rink slowly at first, however, it speeded up after the artificial skate rink was handed over on 26 November 1926. The season grew for 105 days long, which offered more time for exercising and organizing competitions that gave a boost for the sport.

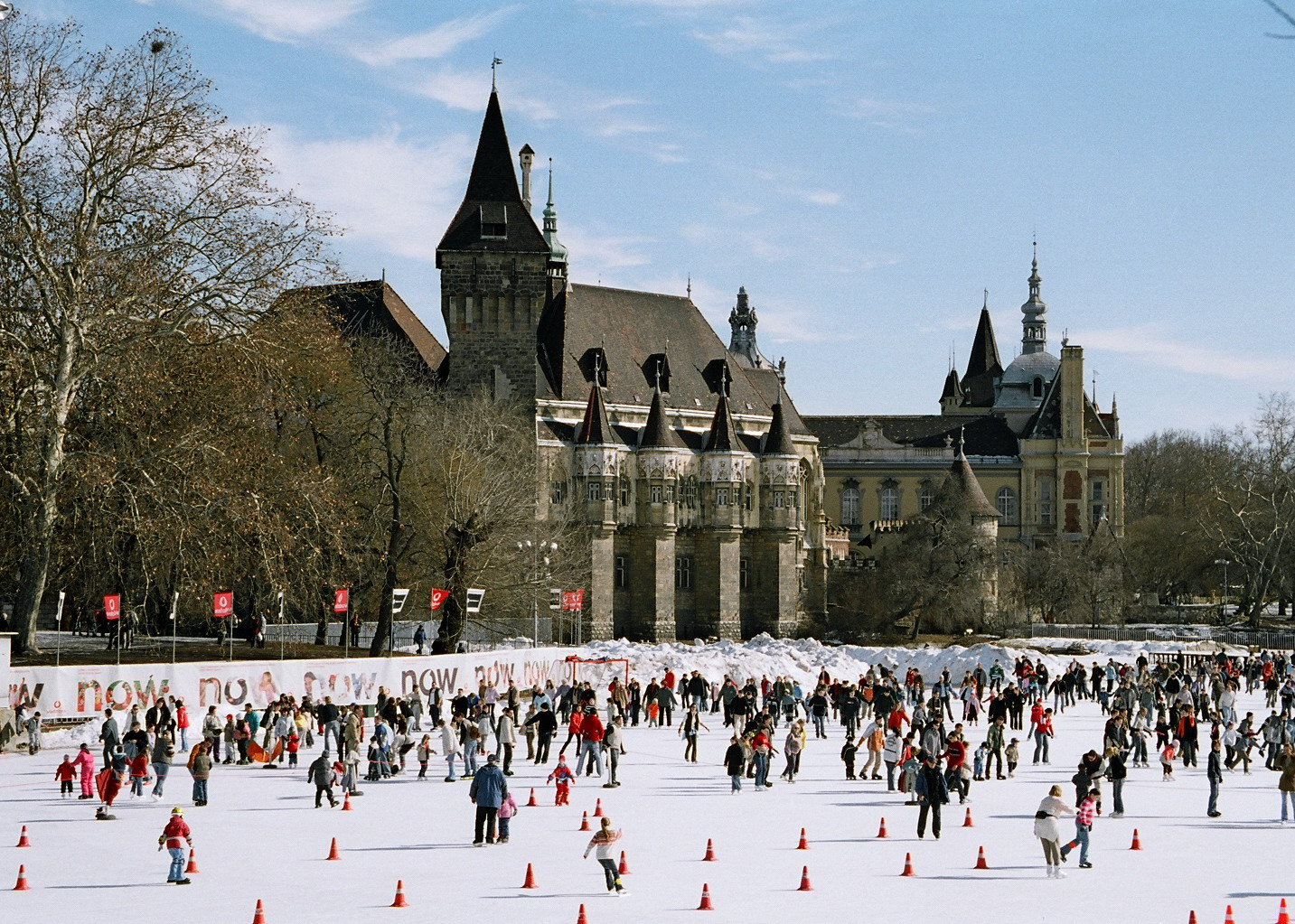
The skating rink with the Vajdahunyad Castle in the background

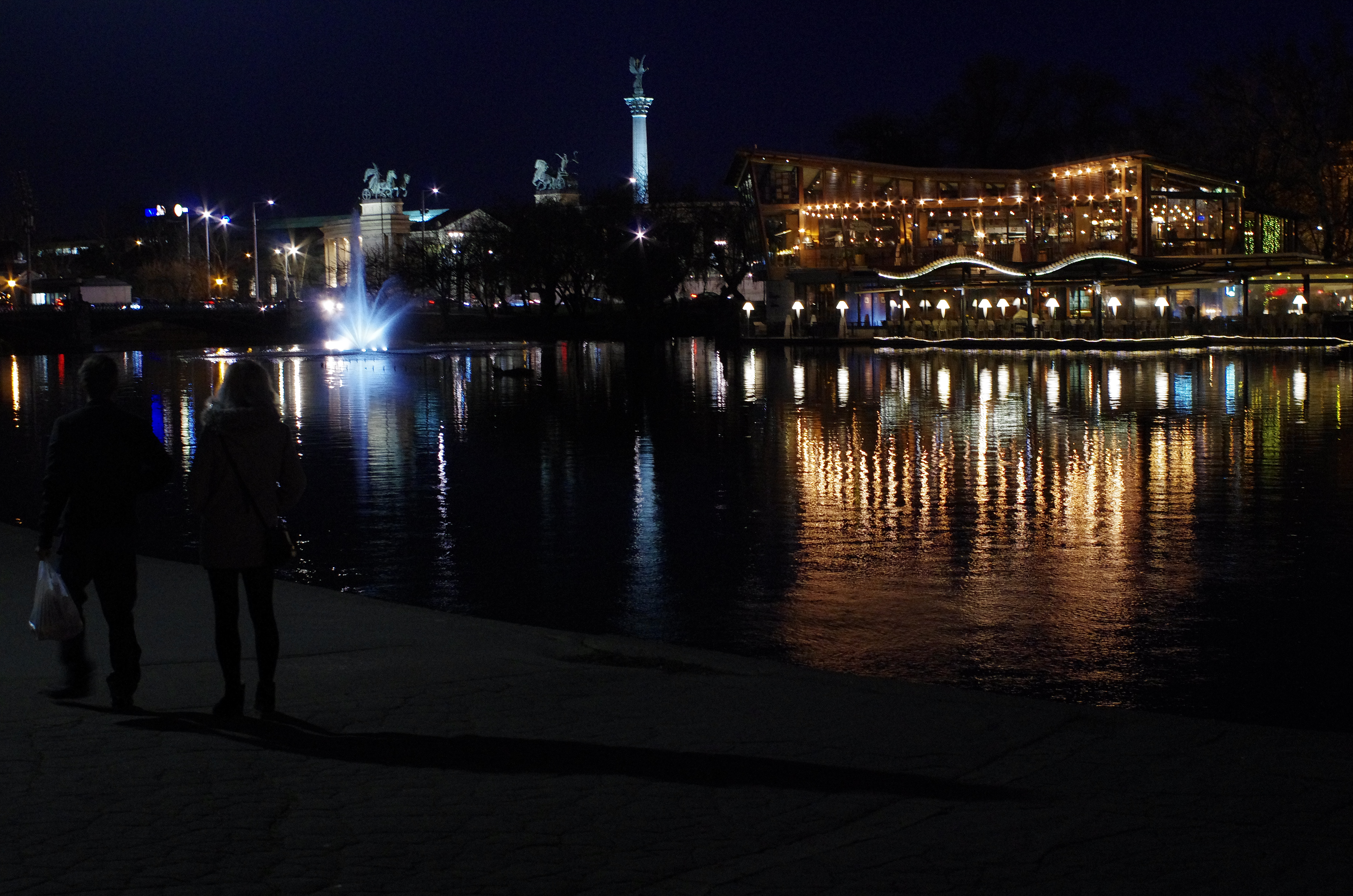
At March night

In 1929 Budapest hosted the Figure Skating World Championship for ladies and pairs and in the 1930s Hungarian figure skaters won a number of European and World titles: the Olga Orgonista–Sándor Szalay pair won the European Championship, while the Emilia Rotter–László Szollás duo won four World Championships between 1931 and 1935. The latter ones also won bronze medal both at the 1932 and 1936 Winter Olympics. By that time the seats of the grandstand was heated by electric plates. Prices were high, a seating place cost 5 pengő, from which one could buy a pair of shoes.

During the World War II, in the 1944 bombings the rink suffered serious damages. After the end of the war works began to reconstruct the skating rink and for the autumn of 1945 bigger part of it became serviceable again. Further expansions took place in the 1960s when the skating area was enlarged, and standard, 400 metres long speed skating tracks were adapted.

It is the only ice surface for bandy in Hungary and the Bandy World Championship 2004, Group B, was played here, as well as the Bandy World Championship for women 2007.

Most recently the Városligeti Műjégpálya was renovated and expanded from 2009 to 2011. The total cost of the amelioration process was 4.7 billion Hungarian Forint (approximately €16 million), of which about 3 billion Ft came from the European Regional Development Fund. After the redevelopment the skating area grew by 15 percent, and now it consist a 180×67 metres skating rink and an international standard ice hockey rink. The quality of the largest ice surface in Europe is ensured by the about 210 kilometres (130 mi) long embedded cooling tube system. The interior of the main building, which is a national monument, was restored to the 1926 state with its gilded pillars and banisters, and went through further expansions: a culture and tourism center, and an event hall was established inside the building, which make enable it to host conferences and to offer other activities (exhibitions, cultural programs) beside skating and boating.

== Events ==
The following major international events took place at the skating rink:

- 1895 European Figure Skating Championships
- 1895 European Speed Skating Championships
- 1909 European Speed Skating Championships
- 1929 Ice Hockey European Championship
- 1929 World Figure Skating Championships (ladies and pairs)
- 1935 World Figure Skating Championships (men and pairs)
- 1939 World Figure Skating Championships (men and pairs)
- 1955 European Figure Skating Championships
- 1963 European Figure Skating Championships
- 2001 World Allround Speed Skating Championships
- 2004 Bandy World Championship, Group B
- 2007 Women's Bandy World Championships
- 2012 European Speed Skating Championships

== Track records ==
These are the track records of the City Park Ice Rink as of 8 January 2012.

Men
Distance	Time	Skater	Date set	Duration
100 m	11.66	(Hungary) Róbert Erdei	17 January 1998	10452 days
500 m	36.89	(Poland) Konrad Niedźwiedzki	6 January 2012	5350 days
1,000 m	1:16.02	(Hungary) Zsolt Baló	27 January 2001	9346 days
1,500 m	1:53.98	(Netherlands) Sven Kramer	7 January 2012	5349 days
3,000 m	4:06.73	(Netherlands) Kees de Ruyter	12 February 2000	9696 days
5,000 m	6:31.82	(Netherlands) Sven Kramer	6 January 2012	5350 days
10,000 m	13:44.19	(Netherlands) Bart Veldkamp	10 February 2001	9332 days

Women
Distance	Time	Skater	Date set	Duration
100 m	12.75	(Hungary) Alexandra Kóti	16 February 2003	8596 days
500 m	39.87	(Czech Republic) Karolína Erbanová	6 January 2012	5350 days
1,000 m	1:24.16	(Hungary) Krisztina Egyed	27 January 2004	8251 days
1,500 m	2:03.38	(Germany) Anni Friesinger	10 February 2001	9332 days
3,000 m	4:16.09	(Czech Republic) Martina Sáblíková	6 January 2012	5350 days
5,000 m	7:21.68	(Germany) Claudia Pechstein	10 February 2001	9332 days

Preceded by Pettit National Ice Center; Milwaukee	World Allround Speed Skating Championships; Venue; 2001	Succeeded by Thialf; Heerenveen
Preceded by Arena Ritten; Collalbo	European Speed Skating Championships; Venue; 2012	Succeeded by Thialf; Heerenveen
