= Marian Ion =

Romanian long track speed skater (born 1988)

Personal information
- Nationality: Romanian
- Born: 14 September 1988 (age 36)

Sport
- Sport: Speed skating

Marian Cristian Ion (born September 14, 1988) is a Romanian long track speed skater who participates in international competitions.

== Personal records ==
Personal records
Men's Speed skating
| Event | Result | Date | Location | Notes |
| 500 m | 38.90 | 2008-01-12 | Kolomna | |
| 1,000 m | 1:16.63 | 2007-01-28 | Collalbo | |
| 1,500 m | 1:51.62 | 2007-11-16 | Calgary | |
| 3,000 m | 3:54.49 | 2007-11-10 | Calgary | |
| 5,000 m | 6:31.58 | 2007-11-17 | Calgary | |
| 10,000 m | 16:15.12 | 2006-02-04 | Miercurea Ciuc | |

=== Career highlights ===
European Allround Championships
2008 – Kolomna, 26th
World Junior Allround Championships
2005 – Seinäjoki, 41st
2006 – Erfurt, 42nd
