= 2014–15 ISU Speed Skating World Cup – Women's 1000 metres =

The 1000 meters distance for women in the 2014–15 ISU Speed Skating World Cup was contested over seven races on six occasions, out of a total of seven World Cup occasions for the season, with the first occasion taking place in Obihiro, Japan, on 14–16 November 2014, and the final occasion taking place in Erfurt, Germany, on 21–22 March 2015.

The defending champion was Heather Richardson of the United States. Brittany Bowe of the United States won the cup. Richardson had to settle for fifth place.

== Top three ==
Position	Athlete	Points	Previous season
1	(United States) Brittany Bowe	510	2nd
2	(Netherlands) Marrit Leenstra	507	11th
3	(China) Li Qishi	485	27th

== Race medallists ==
WC #	Location	Date	Gold	Time	Silver	Time	Bronze	Time	Report
1	Obihiro, Japan	15 November	Marrit Leenstra; Netherlands	1:16.23	Ireen Wüst; Netherlands	1:16.34	Li Qishi; China	1:16.54	
2	Seoul, South Korea	23 November	Li Qishi; China	1:16.95	Marrit Leenstra; Netherlands	1:17.06	Karolína Erbanová; Czech Republic	1:17.33	
3	Berlin, Germany	6 December	Brittany Bowe; United States	1:14.81	Heather Richardson; United States	1:15.14	Li Qishi; China	1:15.94	
4	Heerenveen, Netherlands	13 December	Heather Richardson; United States	1:14.63	Brittany Bowe; United States	1:14.68	Li Qishi; China	1:15.71	
6	Heerenveen, Netherlands	7 February	Heather Richardson; United States	1:14.87	Brittany Bowe; United States	1:15.38	Li Qishi; China	1:15.89	
6	Heerenveen, Netherlands	8 February	Brittany Bowe; United States	1:15.63	Marrit Leenstra; Netherlands	1:15.75	Karolína Erbanová; Czech Republic	1:15.98	
7	Erfurt, Germany	22 March	Brittany Bowe; United States	1:14.61	Heather Richardson; United States	1:15.13	Marrit Leenstra; Netherlands	1:15.78	

== Standings ==
Standings as of 22 March 2015 (end of the season).

#	Name	Nat.	OBI	SEO	BER	HVN1	HVN2	HVN3	ERF	Total
1	Brittany Bowe	(United States)			100	80	80	100	150	510
2	Marrit Leenstra	(Netherlands)	100	80	60	36	45	80	106	507
3	Li Qishi	(China)	70	100	70	70	70	60	45	485
4	Karolína Erbanová	(Czech Republic)	45	70	36	50	60	70	76	407
5	Heather Richardson	(United States)			80	100	100		120	400
6	Ireen Wüst	(Netherlands)	80	45		60	50			235
7	Vanessa Bittner	(Austria)	25	16	40	14	36	40	40	211
8	Yekaterina Aydova	(Kazakhstan)	28	18	18	12	28		90	194
9	Laurine van Riessen	(Netherlands)	6	25	45	21	32	50		179
10	Nao Kodaira	(Japan)	36	60	28		21		21	166
11	Ida Njåtun	(Norway)	19	36	21	32	14		36	158
12	Olga Fatkulina	(Russia)	40	24	14	40	10			128
13	Judith Hesse	(Germany)	32		24	45	18			119
14	Ayaka Kikuchi	(Japan)	8	10	8	25	12	36	18	117
15	Gabriele Hirschbichler	(Germany)	8	19	6		15	32	28	108
16	Ivanie Blondin	(Canada)	12	50	12	28				102
17	Park Seung-hi	(South Korea)	18	28	32	16	8			102
18	Miyako Sumiyoshi	(Japan)	15	12	15	10	5	21	24	102
19	Margot Boer	(Netherlands)					24	45	32	101
20	Lee Sang-hwa	(South Korea)	50		50					100
21	Kali Christ	(Canada)	10	21	8	18	40			97
22	Zhang Hong	(China)	60	32						92
23	Roxanne van Hemert	(Netherlands)	16	14	16	24			14	84
24	Yuliya Skokova	(Russia)	24	40	10					74
25	Nana Takagi	(Japan)	5			19	6	28		58
26	Hege Bøkko	(Norway)			2	15	16	24		57
27	Nadezhda Aseyeva	(Russia)	14	5	11	8	6	8		52
28	Miho Takagi	(Japan)	11	8	2	8	8	11		48
29	Thijsje Oenema	(Netherlands)					25		16	41
30	Luiza Złotkowska	(Poland)		15	5		19			39
31	Sanneke de Neeling	(Netherlands)	21	6		6				33
32	Annouk van der Weijden	(Netherlands)						25		25
33	Janine Smit	(Netherlands)			25					25
34	Li Huawei	(China)				4		19		23
35	Letitia de Jong	(Netherlands)			19					19
36	Angelina Golikova	(Russia)	2		6	11				19
36	Zhang Xin	(China)				2	11	6		19
38	Kelly Gunther	(United States)					1	15		16
39	Margarita Ryzhova	(Russia)	1	11						12
40	Jang Mi	(South Korea)	4	6						10
41	Maki Tabata	(Japan)		8						8
42	Liu Yichi	(China)	6			1				7
43	Sha Yuning	(China)		2			4			6
43	Zhao Xin	(China)					2	4		6
45	Alexandra Ianculescu	(Canada)		4						4
45	Martina Sáblíková	(Czech Republic)			4					4
47	Jessica Gregg	(Netherlands)						2		2
48	Maki Tsuji	(Japan)						1		1
48	Katarzyna Woźniak	(Poland)		1						1
