= 2013 World Single Distance Speed Skating Championships – Women's 500 metres =

Women's 500 metres at the 2013 World Single Distance Speed Skating Championships
- Venue: Adler Arena, Sochi
- Date: 24 March 2013
- Competitors: 24 from 11 nations
- Winning time: 75.347

Medalists
gold medal	Lee Sang-hwa	South Korea
silver medal	Wang Beixing	China
bronze medal	Olga Fatkulina	Russia

The women's 500 metres race of the 2013 World Single Distance Speed Skating Championships was held on 24 March at 15:00 and 16:28 local time.

== Results ==
Rank	Name	Country	Pair	Lane	Race 1	Pair	Lane	Race 2	Total	Diff
1st place, gold medalist(s)	Lee Sang-hwa	South Korea	11	o	37.69 (1)	12	i	37.65 (1)	75.347	
2nd place, silver medalist(s)	Wang Beixing	China	12	i	38.22 (5)	10	o	37.81 (2)	76.043	+0.70
3rd place, bronze medalist(s)	Olga Fatkulina	Russia	12	o	38.14 (2)	11	i	37.94 (3)	76.093	+0.75
4	Jenny Wolf	Germany	11	i	38.16 (4)	11	o	37.97 (4)	76.144	+0.80
5	Thijsje Oenema	Netherlands	9	i	38.16 (3)	12	o	38.03 (5)	76.198	+0.86
6	Nao Kodaira	Japan	10	i	38.48 (7)	9	o	38.25 (7)	76.736	+1.39
7	Yekaterina Aydova	Kazakhstan	4	o	38.49 (8)	9	i	38.24 (6)	76.744	+1.40
8	Heather Richardson	United States	10	o	38.29 (6)	10	i	38.46 (10)	76.768	+1.43
9	Zhang Hong	China	8	o	38.57 (12)	6	i	38.30 (8)	76.887	+1.54
10	Karolína Erbanová	Czech Republic	8	i	38.58 (13)	7	o	38.37 (9)	76.956	+1.61
11	Maki Tsuji	Japan	6	o	38.55 (11)	7	i	38.48 (11)	77.042	+1.70
12	Judith Hesse	Germany	5	i	38.55 (10)	8	o	38.62 (12)	77.173	+1.83
13	Laurine van Riessen	Netherlands	7	o	38.53 (9)	8	i	38.78 (15)	77.321	+1.98
14	Brittany Bowe	United States	5	o	38.65 (14)	5	i	38.72 (14)	77.381	+2.04
15	Miyako Sumiyoshi	Japan	7	i	38.80 (17)	6	o	38.67 (13)	77.481	+2.14
16	Margot Boer	Netherlands	9	o	38.72 (15)	4	i	38.82 (16)	77.544	+2.20
17	Jennifer Plate	Germany	3	o	38.78 (16)	3	i	39.02 (18)	77.810	+2.47
18	Kaylin Irvine	Canada	1	i	39.33 (19)	4	o	38.90 (17)	78.244	+2.90
19	Anastasia Bucsis	Canada	6	i	39.13 (18)	5	o	39.24 (20)	78.379	+3.04
20	Danielle Wotherspoon	Canada	4	i	39.45 (21)	2	o	39.04 (19)	78.494	+3.15
21	Lauren Cholewinski	United States	3	i	39.34 (20)	3	o	39.30 (22)	78.651	+3.31
22	Kim Hyun-yung	South Korea	1	o	39.67 (23)	1	i	39.24 (20)	78.927	+3.58
23	Svetlana Radkevich	Belarus	2	o	39.64 (22)	2	i	39.50 (23)	79.149	+3.81
24	Yuliya Liteykina	Russia	2	i	40.21 (24)	1	o	39.74 (24)	79.958	+4.62
