= 2013 World Single Distance Speed Skating Championships – Women's 1000 metres =

Women's 1000 metres at the 2013 World Single Distance Speed Skating Championships
- Venue: Adler Arena, Sochi
- Date: 23 March 2013
- Competitors: 22 from 11 nations
- Winning time: 1:15.44

Medalists
gold medal	Olga Fatkulina	Russia
silver medal	Ireen Wüst	Netherlands
bronze medal	Brittany Bowe	United States

The women's 1000 metres race of the 2013 World Single Distance Speed Skating Championships was held on 23 March at 13:30 local time.

== Results ==
Rank	Pair	Lane	Name	Country	Time	Time behind	Notes
1st place, gold medalist(s)	9	o	Olga Fatkulina	Russia	1:15.44		
2nd place, silver medalist(s)	6	i	Ireen Wüst	Netherlands	1:15.71	+0.27	
3rd place, bronze medalist(s)	11	i	Brittany Bowe	United States	1:15.87	+0.43	
4	11	o	Christine Nesbitt	Canada	1:16.02	+0.58	
5	10	o	Karolína Erbanová	Czech Republic	1:16.09	+0.65	
6	10	i	Heather Richardson	United States	1:16.10	+0.66	
7	9	i	Zhang Hong	China	1:16.48	+1.04	
8	8	i	Marrit Leenstra	Netherlands	1:16.67	+1.23	
9	7	i	Yekaterina Aydova	Kazakhstan	1:16.93	+1.49	
10	4	o	Yekaterina Lobysheva	Russia	1:17.27	+1.83	
11	8	o	Laurine van Riessen	Netherlands	1:17.49	+2.05	
12	7	o	Monique Angermüller	Germany	1:17.51	+2.07	
13	4	i	Kaylin Irvine	Canada	1:17.60	+2.16	
14	5	i	Miyako Sumiyoshi	Japan	1:17.76	+2.32	
15	5	o	Judith Hesse	Germany	1:18.00	+2.56	
16	6	o	Nao Kodaira	Japan	1:18.11	+2.67	
17	3	i	Gabriele Hirschbichler	Germany	1:18.51	+3.07	
18	2	i	Anastasia Bucsis	Canada	1:18.75	+3.31	
19	2	o	Erina Kamiya	Japan	1:19.31	+3.87	
20	3	o	Park Seung-ju	South Korea	1:19.62	+4.18	
21	1	o	Anna Ringsred	United States	1:20.22	+4.78	
22	1	i	Svetlana Radkevich	Belarus	1:20.79	+5.35	
