= 2012 World Single Distance Speed Skating Championships – Women's 1000 metres =

The women's 1000 metres race of the 2012 World Single Distance Speed Skating Championships was held on 24 March at 12:00 local time.

== Results ==
Rank	Pair	Lane	Name	Country	Time	Time behind	Notes
1st place, gold medalist(s)	12	o	Christine Nesbitt	Canada	1:15.16		
2nd place, silver medalist(s)	9	i	Yu Jing	China	1:15.98	+0.82	
3rd place, bronze medalist(s)	12	i	Margot Boer	Netherlands	1:16.16	+1.00	
4	11	i	Heather Richardson	United States	1:16.30	+1.14	
5	11	o	Ireen Wüst	Netherlands	1:16.33	+1.17	
6	10	i	Yekaterina Shikhova	Russia	1:16.50	+1.34	
7	9	o	Zhang Hong	China	1:16.50	+1.34	
8	8	o	Brittany Bowe	United States	1:17.12	+1.96	
9	4	i	Kali Christ	Canada	1:17.15	+1.99	
10	3	o	Yekaterina Aydova	Kazakhstan	1:17.35	+2.19	
11	10	o	Laurine van Riessen	Netherlands	1:17.47	+2.31	
12	7	i	Nao Kodaira	Japan	1:17.54	+2.38	
13	6	o	Jin Peiyu	China	1:17.65	+2.49	
14	7	o	Olga Fatkulina	Russia	1:17.74	+2.58	
15	5	o	Karolína Erbanová	Czech Republic	1:17.97	+2.81	
16	5	i	Miho Takagi	Japan	1:18.05	+2.89	
17	3	i	Kaylin Irvine	Canada	1:18.19	+3.03	
18	1	o	Ida Njåtun	Norway	1:18.30	+3.14	
19	8	i	Maki Tsuji	Japan	1:18.63	+3.47	
20	6	i	Judith Hesse	Germany	1:18.73	+3.57	
21	2	i	Gabriele Hirschbichler	Germany	1:19.09	+3.93	
22	4	o	Heike Hartmann	Germany	1:19.34	+4.18	
23	1	i	Svetlana Radkevich	Belarus	1:20.09	+4.93	
24	2	o	Lauren Cholewinski	United States	1:22.04	+6.88	
