= 2013–14 ISU Speed Skating World Cup – Women's Grand World Cup =

The women's Grand World Cup of the 2013–14 ISU Speed Skating World Cup was the season overall competition, for which all individual races and distances over the entire season counted, with points awarded to the top five competitors of each race.

Heather Richardson of the United States was the overall winner.

== Rules ==
All races and distances that were competed individually, including the mass start, counted.

=== Points system ===
In order to determine an overall World Cup winner, a special points system was used, awarding points for the top five skaters in each individual event.

Points table for Grand World Cup
Rank	World Cup 1–5	World Cup 6
1	10	15
2	8	12
3	7	10.5
4	6	9
5	5	7.5

Note: half points were awarded in distances that were skated twice in the same competition.

=== Prize money ===
The Grand World Cup winner was awarded $20000.

== Standings ==
Standings as of 16 March 2014 (end of the season).

			Calgary					Salt Lake City					Astana					Berlin					Inzell						Heerenveen						
#	Name	Nat.	500	500	1000	1500	3000	500	500	1000	1500	3000	500	500	1000	1500	5000	500	500	1000	1500	3000	500	500	1000	1500	3000	MS	500	500	1000	1500	3000	MS	Total
1	Heather Richardson	(United States)	2.5	2.5	10			3.5	4	8	7		3	2.5	10			3	3.5	10			5	5	10				6	5.25	7.5				108.25
2	Ireen Wüst	(Netherlands)				8	7			7	10										10	7				10	10				15	15			99
3	Brittany Bowe	(United States)			7					10	8				8	10				8					8	7					9	7.5			82.5
4	Olga Fatkulina	(Russia)			5			2.5	3.5	6			2.5	3.5	7			4	5	7			3.5	4	7				7.5	7.5					75.5
5	Lotte van Beek	(Netherlands)			8	10					6									6	7					8					10.5	12			67.5
6	Martina Sáblíková	(Czech Republic)				7	8					10					10					10					8						9		62
7	Lee Sang-hwa	(South Korea)	5	5	6			5	5				5	5	5			5																	46
8	Claudia Pechstein	(Germany)					10					8					8					8						10							44
9	Jenny Wolf	(Germany)	4	4				3					4	4					3				2.5	3.5					4.5	6					38.5
10	Yuliya Skokova	(Russia)									5				6	8										6						10.5			35.5
11	Margot Boer	(Netherlands)		3						5															6				3.75	3.75	12				33.5
12	Marrit Leenstra	(Netherlands)				6														5	6											9			26
12	Yvonne Nauta	(Netherlands)															7										7						12		26
14	Nao Kodaira	(Japan)	3										3.5					2.5					3	3					5.25	4.5					24.75
15	Olga Graf	(Russia)														6											6						10.5		22.5
16	Wang Beixing	(China)	3.5	3.5				4	3									3.5	4																21.5
17	Francesca Lollobrigida	(Italy)																										5						15	20
18	Irene Schouten	(Netherlands)																										7						12	19
19	Antoinette de Jong	(Netherlands)					6					7										5													18
20	Jorien Voorhuis	(Netherlands)					5					6															5								16
21	Janneke Ensing	(Netherlands)																										8						7.5	15.5
22	Mariska Huisman	(Netherlands)																										6						9	15
22	Annouk van der Weijden	(Netherlands)																															15		15
24	Katarzyna Bachleda-Curuś	(Poland)																			8	6													14
25	Linda de Vries	(Netherlands)										5																					7.5		12.5
26	Ivanie Blondin	(Canada)																																10.5	10.5
27	Yekaterina Lobysheva	(Russia)				5																				5									10
28	Thijsje Oenema	(Netherlands)												3					2.5					2.5											8
29	Brittany Schussler	(Canada)														7																			7
30	Shiho Ishizawa	(Japan)															6																		6
31	Karolína Erbanová	(Czech Republic)																							5										5
31	Yekaterina Shikhova	(Russia)																			5														5
31	Nana Takagi	(Japan)															5																		5
31	Luiza Złotkowska	(Poland)														5																			5
35	Judith Hesse	(Germany)																					4												4
36	Yu Jing	(China)							2.5																										2.5
#	Name	Nat.	500	500	1000	1500	3000	500	500	1000	1500	3000	500	500	1000	1500	5000	500	500	1000	1500	3000	500	500	1000	1500	3000	MS	500	500	1000	1500	3000	MS	Total
			Calgary					Salt Lake City					Astana					Berlin					Inzell						Heerenveen						
