= 2015 World Single Distance Speed Skating Championships – Women's 500 metres =

Women's 500 metres at the 2015 World Single Distance Speed Skating Championships
- Venue: Thialf, Heerenveen
- Date: 14 February 2015
- Competitors: 24 from 12 nations
- Winning time: 75.332

Medalists
gold medal	Heather Richardson	United States
silver medal	Brittany Bowe	United States
bronze medal	Nao Kodaira	Japan

The women's 500 meter race of the 2015 World Single Distance Speed Skating Championships was held on 14 February 2015.

== Results ==
The first run was started at 15:00 and the second run at 16:32.

Rank	Name	Country	Pair	Lane	Race 1	Pair	Lane	Race 2	Total	Diff
1st place, gold medalist(s)	Heather Richardson	USA	9	o	37.703	12	i	37.629	75.332	
2nd place, silver medalist(s)	Brittany Bowe	USA	7	i	37.997	12	o	37.788	75.785	+0.46
3rd place, bronze medalist(s)	Nao Kodaira	JPN	11	i	38.047	11	o	37.846	75.893	+0.57
4	Thijsje Oenema	NED	7	o	38.025	11	i	37.971	75.996	+0.67
5	Lee Sang-hwa	KOR	12	i	38.104	10	o	37.900	76.004	+0.68
6	Judith Hesse	GER	11	o	38.172	10	i	38.276	76.448	+1.12
7	Karolína Erbanová	CZE	10	o	38.283	9	i	38.339	76.622	+1.29
8	Yekaterina Aydova	KAZ	5	i	38.379	9	o	38.259	76.638	+1.31
9	Floor van den Brandt	NED	10	i	38.492	7	o	38.308	76.800	+1.47
10	Vanessa Bittner	AUT	8	i	38.441	8	o	38.411	76.852	+1.52
11	Margot Boer	NED	12	o	38.313	8	i	38.565	76.878	+1.55
12	Maki Tsuji	JPN	8	o	38.567	7	i	38.656	77.223	+1.90
13	Olga Fatkulina	RUS	9	i	38.611	6	o	38.617	77.228	+1.90
14	Nadezhda Aseyeva	RUS	5	o	38.784	5	i	38.760	77.544	+2.22
15	Miyako Sumiyoshi	JPN	6	o	38.766	6	i	38.966	77.732	+2.40
16	Li Qishi	CHN	3	i	38.939	5	o	38.875	77.814	+2.49
17	Marsha Hudey	CAN	4	o	38.875	4	i	38.950	77.825	+2.50
18	Yvonne Daldossi	ITA	4	i	39.154	3	o	38.832	77.986	+2.66
19	Yuliya Kozyreva	RUS	2	o	39.123	3	i	39.220	78.343	+3.02
20	Li Huawei	CHN	2	i	39.152	4	o	39.213	78.365	+3.04
21	Park Seung-hi	KOR	6	i	39.284	2	o	39.386	78.670	+3.34
22	Heather McLean	CAN	1	i	39.295	1	o	39.429	78.724	+3.40
23	Lee Bo-ra	KOR	3	o	39.237	2	i	39.495	78.732	+3.40
24	Jessica Gregg	CAN	1	o	39.655	1	i	39.960	79.615	+4.29
