= 2014–15 ISU Speed Skating World Cup – Women's 500 metres =

The 500 meters distance for women in the 2014–15 ISU Speed Skating World Cup was contested over 12 races on six occasions, out of a total of seven World Cup occasions for the season, with the first occasion taking place in Obihiro, Japan, on 14–16 November 2014, and the final occasion taking place in Erfurt, Germany, on 21–22 March 2015.

The defending champion was Olga Fatkulina of Russia. Nao Kodaira of Japan won the cup. Fatkulina had to settle for 12th place.

== Top three ==
Position	Athlete	Points	Previous season
1	(Japan) Nao Kodaira	926	5th
2	(South Korea) Lee Sang-hwa	880	4th
3	(United States) Heather Richardson	710	2nd

== Race medallists ==
WC #	Location	Date	Gold	Time	Silver	Time	Bronze	Time	Report
1	Obihiro, Japan	14 November	Lee Sang-hwa; South Korea	38.07	Nao Kodaira; Japan	38.18	Olga Fatkulina; Russia	38.50	
1	Obihiro, Japan	16 November	Lee Sang-hwa; South Korea	37.92	Nao Kodaira; Japan	38.06	Vanessa Bittner; Austria	38.33	
2	Seoul, South Korea	21 November	Nao Kodaira; Japan	38.05	Lee Sang-hwa; South Korea	38.18	Judith Hesse; Germany	38.95	
2	Seoul, South Korea	22 November	Lee Sang-hwa; South Korea	37.99	Nao Kodaira; Japan	38.51	Karolína Erbanová; Czech Republic	38.83	
3	Berlin, Germany	5 December	Lee Sang-hwa; South Korea	37.87	Heather Richardson; United States	38.21	Margot Boer; Netherlands	38.40	
3	Berlin, Germany	7 December	Lee Sang-hwa; South Korea	37.96	Heather Richardson; United States	38.07	Nao Kodaira; Japan	38.11	
4	Heerenveen, Netherlands	12 December	Lee Sang-hwa; South Korea	37.69	Nao Kodaira; Japan	37.70	Judith Hesse; Germany	37.88	
4	Heerenveen, Netherlands	14 December	Heather Richardson; United States	37.72	Brittany Bowe; United States	38.05	Lee Sang-hwa; South Korea	38.07	
6	Heerenveen, Netherlands	7 February	Heather Richardson; United States	37.82	Nao Kodaira; Japan	38.14	Brittany Bowe; United States	38.21	
6	Heerenveen, Netherlands	8 February	Judith Hesse; Germany	38.19	Lee Sang-hwa; South Korea	38.21	Thijsje Oenema; Netherlands	38.23	
7	Erfurt, Germany	21 March	Heather Richardson; United States	37.80	Brittany Bowe; United States	37.93	Yekaterina Aydova; Kazakhstan	38.15	
7	Erfurt, Germany	22 March	Heather Richardson; United States	37.77	Brittany Bowe; United States	37.97	Nao Kodaira; Japan	38.49	

== Standings ==
Standings as of 22 March 2015 (end of the season).

#	Name	Nat.	OBI1	OBI2	SEO1	SEO2	BER1	BER2	HVN1	HVN2	HVN3	HVN4	ERF1	ERF2	Total
1	Nao Kodaira	(Japan)	80	80	100	80	60	70	80	60	80	40	90	106	926
2	Lee Sang-hwa	(South Korea)	100	100	80	100	100	100	100	70	50	80			880
3	Heather Richardson	(United States)					80	80	50	100	100		150	150	710
4	Judith Hesse	(Germany)	60	21	70	24	50	18	70	50	36	100	18	21	538
5	Brittany Bowe	(United States)					25	60	60	80	70		120	120	535
6	Karolína Erbanová	(Czech Republic)	24	24	40	70	40	36	32	36	45	60	40	76	523
7	Thijsje Oenema	(Netherlands)	32	40	36	36	28	10	45	45	32	70	76	36	486
8	Margot Boer	(Netherlands)	50	60	28	16	70	50	40	40	24	45	36		459
9	Floor van den Brandt	(Netherlands)	45	36	60	60	18	45	14	28	28	36	21	45	436
10	Yekaterina Aydova	(Kazakhstan)	40		50	18	16	21	6	14	18	50	106	90	429
11	Vanessa Bittner	(Austria)	25	70	14	32	36	40	28	24	60	28	28	40	425
12	Olga Fatkulina	(Russia)	70	45	21	50	45	24	24	21	40	18			358
13	Maki Tsuji	(Japan)	12	50	21	45	24	32	21	32	21	32	24	32	346
14	Miyako Sumiyoshi	(Japan)	16	28	12	28	32	16	18	16	12	10	32	28	248
15	Bo van der Werff	(Netherlands)	21	32	32	14	21	28	36	18			16	18	236
16	Li Qishi	(China)	36	10	16	40	3		8	10	16	16	45		200
17	Nadezhda Aseyeva	(Russia)	8	18	19	25	10	5	16	12	14	6			133
18	Arisa Go	(Japan)	28	14	5	5	6	6	19	11	6	5	12	14	131
19	Li Huawei	(China)	15	4	6	4	6	11	11	6	11	25	10	16	125
20	Anice Das	(Netherlands)	14	16	25	21	12	12	10	8					118
21	Park Seung-hi	(South Korea)	19	25	24	6	8	8	12	6	5	4			117
22	Yvonne Daldossi	(Italy)			8	4	19			1	25	21	14	24	116
23	Angelina Golikova	(Russia)	11	19	8	12	14	14	25	5					108
24	Yuliya Kozyreva	(Russia)	8	8	6	11	15	15		19	8	8			98
25	Marsha Hudey	(Canada)	10	8		8	11	6		25	10	12			90
26	Heather McLean	(Canada)	2	6	2		8	19	15	15	6	15			88
27	Zhang Hong	(China)	18	12	45	10									85
28	Jang Mi	(South Korea)	6	15	10	8		25	5	4					73
29	Lee Bo-ra	(South Korea)	4	11	15	19	5	4	4	8		1			71
30	Laurine van Riessen	(Netherlands)									15	24			39
31	Sugar Todd	(United States)					1		2	6	8	19			36
32	Denise Roth	(Germany)	6	6	11	6		2	1	2					34
33	Janine Smit	(Netherlands)									19	14			33
34	Gabriele Hirschbichler	(Germany)	5	5	4	2	2	8							26
35	Kim Min-sun	(South Korea)			1	15									16
36	Alexandra Ianculescu	(Canada)		2			4		8						14
37	Zhang Xin	(China)									2	11			13
38	Jessica Gregg	(Canada)									4	8			12
39	Sha Yuning	(China)						4			1	6			11
40	Zhang Yue	(China)							6						6
41	Kali Christ	(Canada)										4			4
42	Elina Risku	(Finland)										2			2
43	Mio Kuroiwa	(Japan)	1	1											2
44	Hege Bøkko	(Norway)						1							1
44	Tamara Oudenaarden	(Canada)				1									1
