= 2014–15 ISU Speed Skating World Cup – World Cup 7 – Women's 1000 metres =

The women's 1000 metres race of the 2014–15 ISU Speed Skating World Cup 7, arranged in the Gunda Niemann-Stirnemann-Halle in Erfurt, Germany, was held on 22 March 2015.

== Result ==
The race took place on Sunday, 22 March, scheduled in the afternoon session, at 15:13.

Rank	Name	Nat.	Pair	Lane	Time	WC points	GWC points
1st place, gold medalist(s)	Brittany Bowe	(United States)	7	i	1:14.61	150	150
2nd place, silver medalist(s)	Heather Richardson	(United States)	6	i	1:15.13	120	120
3rd place, bronze medalist(s)	Marrit Leenstra	(Netherlands)	8	o	1:15.78	106	106
4	Yekaterina Aydova	(Kazakhstan)	4	i	1:16.53	90	90
5	Karolína Erbanová	(Czech Republic)	7	o	1:16.74	76	76
6	Li Qishi	(China)	8	i	1:16.76	45	—
7	Vanessa Bittner	(Austria)	6	o	1:17.53	40	
8	Ida Njåtun	(Norway)	5	o	1:17.62	36	
9	Margot Boer	(Netherlands)	1	i	1:17.87	32	
10	Gabriele Hirschbichler	(Germany)	3	i	1:17.89	28	
11	Miyako Sumiyoshi	(Japan)	3	o	1:18.23	24	
12	Nao Kodaira	(Japan)	5	i	1:18.28	21	
13	Ayaka Kikuchi	(Japan)	4	o	1:18.62	18	
14	Thijsje Oenema	(Netherlands)	1	o	1:19.67	16	
15	Roxanne van Hemert	(Netherlands)	2	o	1:20.36	14	
16	Yuliya Skokova	(Russia)	2	i	DNS		
