= 2014–15 ISU Speed Skating World Cup – Women's Grand World Cup =

The women's Grand World Cup of the 2014–15 ISU Speed Skating World Cup was the season overall competition, for which all individual races and distances over the entire season counted, with points awarded to the top five competitors of each race.

Heather Richardson of the United States successfully defended her title from the previous season.

== Rules ==
All races and distances that were competed individually, including the mass start, counted.

=== Points system ===
In order to determine an overall World Cup winner, a special points system was used, awarding points for the top five skaters in each individual event.

Points table for Grand World Cup
Rank	World Cup 1–6	World Cup 7
1	100	150
2	80	120
3	70	106
4	60	90
5	50	76

Note: half points were awarded in distances that were skated twice in the same competition.

=== Prize money ===
The Grand World Cup winner was awarded $20000.

== Standings ==
Standings as of 22 March 2015 (end of the season).

				Obihiro						Seoul						Berlin						Heerenveen (1)						Hamar			Heerenveen (2)				Erfurt						
#	Name	Nat.	Total	500	500	1000	1500	3000	MS	500	500	1000	1500	5000	MS	500	500	1000	1500	3000	MS	500	500	1000	1500	3000	MS	1500	3000	MS	500	500	1000	1000	500	500	1000	1500	3000	MS	Total
1	Heather Richardson	(United States)	1195													40	40	80	80			25	50	100	100			100			50		50		75	75	120	120		90	1195
2	Martina Sáblíková	(Czech Republic)	1096					80						80	100					70	50				50	100	60		100									106	150	150	1096
3	Brittany Bowe	(United States)	1045														30	100	60			30	40	80	80			80			35		40	50	60	60	150	150			1045
4	Ireen Wüst	(Netherlands)	855			80	100	100					80						100	100				60	60	80			70				25								855
5	Marrit Leenstra	(Netherlands)	796			100	80					80	100					60	70						70									40			106	90			796
6	Ivanie Blondin	(Canada)	610						100			50		70	70						80					60	100			80											610
7	Lee Sang-hwa	(South Korea)	540	50	50	50				40	50					50	50	50				50	35								25	40									540
8	Nao Kodaira	(Japan)	503	40	40					50	40	60				30	35					40	30								40				45	53					503
9	Marije Joling	(Netherlands)	480				50	50											50	80								70	60										120		480
10	Li Qishi	(China)	425			70						100	50					70						70									35	30							425
11	Irene Schouten	(Netherlands)	420						70						80						100						70			100											420
12	Karolína Erbanová	(Czech Republic)	364								35	70												50								30	30	35		38	76				364
13	Claudia Pechstein	(Germany)	340											100												50	50			50									90		340
14	Nana Takagi	(Japan)	260						80												60																			120	260
15	Yekaterina Aydova	(Kazakhstan)	238							25																						25			53	45	90				238
16	Carlijn Achtereekte	(Netherlands)	226																							70			80										76		226
16	Diane Valkenburg	(Netherlands)	226					60						60																									106		226
18	Jorien Voorhuis	(Netherlands)	220					70						50						50									50												220
19	Judith Hesse	(Germany)	200	30						35						25						35	25									50									200
20	Ida Njåtun	(Norway)	196				60						60																									76			196
21	Olga Graf	(Russia)	130										70							60																					130
21	Yuliya Skokova	(Russia)	130				70																					60													130
23	Miho Takagi	(Japan)	120						60																					60											120
24	Margot Boer	(Netherlands)	115	25	30											35	25																								115
25	Rixt Meijer	(Netherlands)	110						50						60																										110
26	Francesca Lollobrigida	(Italy)	106																																					106	106
27	Kim Bo-reum	(South Korea)	80																								80														80
28	Bente Kraus	(Germany)	76																																					76	76
29	Thijsje Oenema	(Netherlands)	73																													35			38						73
30	Mariska Huisman	(Netherlands)	70																											70											70
30	Yun Ye-jin	(South Korea)	70																		70																				70
32	Vanessa Bittner	(Austria)	65		35																										30										65
33	Floor van den Brandt	(Netherlands)	60							30	30																														60
33	Olga Fatkulina	(Russia)	60	35							25																														60
33	Zhang Hong	(China)	60			60																																			60
36	Jelena Peeters	(Belgium)	50												50																										50
36	Linda de Vries	(Netherlands)	50																									50													50
38	Laurine van Riessen	(Netherlands)	25																															25							25
38	Maki Tsuji	(Japan)	25		25																																				25
#	Name	Nat.	Total	500	500	1000	1500	3000	MS	500	500	1000	1500	5000	MS	500	500	1000	1500	3000	MS	500	500	1000	1500	3000	MS	1500	3000	MS	500	500	1000	1000	500	500	1000	1500	3000	MS	Total
				Obihiro						Seoul						Berlin						Heerenveen (1)						Hamar			Heerenveen (2)				Erfurt						
