= 2013–14 ISU Speed Skating World Cup – Women's 1000 metres =

The 1000 meters distance for women in the 2013–14 ISU Speed Skating World Cup was contested over six races on six occasions, out of a total of six World Cup occasions for the season, with the first occasion taking place in Calgary, Alberta, Canada, on 8–10 November 2013, and the final occasion taking place in Heerenveen, Netherlands, on 14–16 March 2014.

On 17 November 2013, at the World Cup stop in Salt Lake City, Brittany Bowe of the United States broke the world record with a time of 1:12.58.

Kim Hyun-yung of South Korea broke the girls' world record, first in Calgary on 10 November, with a time of 1:15.18, then again in Salt Lake City one week later, with a time of 1:14.95.

Heather Richardson of the United States defended her title from the previous season, while compatriot Brittany Bowe repeated her second place, and Olga Fatkulina of Russia came third.

== Top three ==
Position	Athlete	Points	Previous season
1	(United States) Heather Richardson	555	1st
2	(United States) Brittany Bowe	500	2nd
3	(Russia) Olga Fatkulina	352	6th

== Race medallists ==
Occasion #	Location	Date	Gold	Time	Silver	Time	Bronze	Time	Report
1	Calgary, Alberta, Canada	10 November	Heather Richardson; United States	1:13.23	Lotte van Beek; Netherlands	1:13.36	Brittany Bowe; United States	1:13.70	
2	Salt Lake City, United States	17 November	Brittany Bowe; United States	1:12.58; WR	Heather Richardson; United States	1:12.61	Ireen Wüst; Netherlands	1:13.33	
3	Astana, Kazakhstan	1 December	Heather Richardson; United States	1:14.22	Brittany Bowe; United States	1:14.78	Olga Fatkulina; Russia	1:15.18	
4	Berlin, Germany	8 December	Heather Richardson; United States	1:14.51	Brittany Bowe; United States	1:15.42	Olga Fatkulina; Russia	1:15.49	
5	Inzell, Germany	9 March	Heather Richardson; United States	1:14.87	Brittany Bowe; United States	1:15.26	Olga Fatkulina; Russia	1:15.34	
6	Heerenveen, Netherlands	16 March	Ireen Wüst; Netherlands	1:14.63	Margot Boer; Netherlands	1:14.92	Lotte van Beek; Netherlands	1:15.09	

== Standings ==
Standings as of 16 March 2014 (end of the season).

#	Name	Nat.	CAL	SLC	AST	BER	INZ	HVN	Total
1	Heather Richardson	(United States)	100	80	100	100	100	75	555
2	Brittany Bowe	(United States)	70	100	80	80	80	90	500
3	Olga Fatkulina	(Russia)	50	60	70	70	70	32	352
4	Lotte van Beek	(Netherlands)	80	32		60	36	105	313
5	Margot Boer	(Netherlands)	45	50		36	60	120	311
6	Ireen Wüst	(Netherlands)	40	70				150	260
7	Karolína Erbanová	(Czech Republic)	16	18	40	21	50	40	185
8	Yuliya Skokova	(Russia)	15	8	60		40	36	159
9	Nao Kodaira	(Japan)	24	40	28	32	16	16	156
10	Lee Sang-hwa	(South Korea)	60		50	45			155
11	Marrit Leenstra	(Netherlands)				50	45	45	140
12	Monique Angermüller	(Germany)	19	28	18		28	24	117
13	Laurine van Riessen	(Netherlands)	10	15	32		32	21	110
14	Kaylin Irvine	(Canada)	2		21	40	18	18	99
15	Wang Beixing	(China)	36	36		24			96
16	Yekaterina Lobysheva	(Russia)	21	24			21	28	94
17	Manon Kamminga	(Netherlands)	8	19	36	28			91
18	Gabriele Hirschbichler	(Germany)	8	10	24	14	12	12	80
19	Yekaterina Aydova	(Russia)	12	4	45	18			79
20	Christine Nesbitt	(Canada)	28	21					49
21	Thijsje Oenema	(Netherlands)			25		24		49
22	Kim Hyun-yung	(South Korea)	25	14	8				47
23	Zhang Hong	(China)		45					45
24	Miyako Sumiyoshi	(Japan)					25	14	39
25	Judith Hesse	(Germany)	32	6					38
26	Miho Takagi	(Japan)		1	6	19	10		36
27	Li Qishi	(China)			19	16			35
28	Yu Jing	(China)	18	16					34
29	Yuki Matsuda	(Japan)	6		16	12			34
30	Maki Tsuji	(Japan)	4		14	10	6		34
31	Yekaterina Malysheva	(Russia)	1	25					26
32	Yekaterina Shikhova	(Russia)	14	12					26
33	Antoinette de Jong	(Netherlands)				25			25
34	Ji Jia	(China)	5		12	8			25
35	Sugar Todd	(United States)				15	8		23
36	Natalia Czerwonka	(Poland)			8		14		22
37	Kelly Gunther	(United States)					19		19
38	Vanessa Bittner	(Austria)	6	11					17
39	Erina Kamiya	(Japan)		2	10		5		17
40	Luiza Złotkowska	(Poland)	11	5					16
41	Anice Das	(Netherlands)			15				15
41	Roxanne Dufter	(Germany)					15		15
43	Zhao Xin	(China)			2	11			13
44	Annette Gerritsen	(Netherlands)			11				11
44	Angelina Golikova	(Russia)					11		11
46	Katja Franzen	(Germany)					8		8
46	Lee Bo-ra	(South Korea)				8			8
46	Elli Ochowicz	(United States)		8					8
49	Yevgeniya Dmitriyeva	(Russia)			4	4			8
50	Kaitlyn McGregor	(Switzerland)				6			6
50	Elina Risku	(Finland)					6		6
50	Brittany Schussler	(Canada)		6					6
53	Ahn Jee-min	(South Korea)				2			2
54	Rebekah Bradford	(United States)			1	1			2
