= 2014–15 ISU Speed Skating World Cup – Women's 1500 metres =

The 1500 meters distance for women in the 2014–15 ISU Speed Skating World Cup was contested over six races on six occasions, out of a total of seven World Cup occasions for the season, with the first occasion taking place in Obihiro, Japan, on 14–16 November 2014, and the final occasion taking place in Erfurt, Germany, on 21–22 March 2015.

The defending champion was Ireen Wüst of the Netherlands. Wüst's compatriot Marrit Leenstra won the cup, while Wüst had to settle for fourth place.

== Top three ==
Position	Athlete	Points	Previous season
1	(Netherlands) Marrit Leenstra	410	5th
2	(United States) Heather Richardson	400	17th
3	(United States) Brittany Bowe	370	3rd

== Race medallists ==
WC #	Location	Date	Gold	Time	Silver	Time	Bronze	Time	Report
1	Obihiro, Japan	16 November	Ireen Wüst; Netherlands	1:56.93	Marrit Leenstra; Netherlands	1:57.76	Yuliya Skokova; Russia	1:58.10	
2	Seoul, South Korea	22 November	Marrit Leenstra; Netherlands	1:57.76	Ireen Wüst; Netherlands	1:58.33	Olga Graf; Russia	1:59.02	
3	Berlin, Germany	7 December	Ireen Wüst; Netherlands	1:55.89	Heather Richardson; United States	1:55.91	Marrit Leenstra; Netherlands	1:55.93	
4	Heerenveen, Netherlands	14 December	Heather Richardson; United States	1:53.87	Brittany Bowe; United States	1:54.70	Marrit Leenstra; Netherlands	1:55.95	
5	Hamar, Norway	31 January	Heather Richardson; United States	1:56.30	Brittany Bowe; United States	1:57.30	Marije Joling; Netherlands	1:57.51	
7	Erfurt, Germany	21 March	Brittany Bowe; United States	1:55.88	Heather Richardson; United States	1:55.99	Martina Sáblíková; Czech Republic	1:56.74	

== Standings ==
Standings as of 21 March 2015 (end of the season).

#	Name	Nat.	OBI	SEO	BER	HVN	HAM	ERF	Total
1	Marrit Leenstra	(Netherlands)	80	100	70	70		90	410
2	Heather Richardson	(United States)			80	100	100	120	400
3	Brittany Bowe	(United States)			60	80	80	150	370
4	Ireen Wüst	(Netherlands)	100	80	100	60			340
5	Martina Sáblíková	(Czech Republic)	40	32	40	50	45	106	313
6	Ida Njåtun	(Norway)	60	60	36	40	32	76	304
7	Marije Joling	(Netherlands)	50	36	50		70	45	251
8	Linda de Vries	(Netherlands)	45	45	21	45	50	32	238
9	Yuliya Skokova	(Russia)	70	40	24		60	40	234
10	Olga Graf	(Russia)	24	70	45	24		36	199
11	Luiza Złotkowska	(Poland)	28	28	32	21	40	21	170
12	Nana Takagi	(Japan)	36	6	28	18	28	28	144
13	Ayaka Kikuchi	(Japan)	21	18	12	32	21	24	128
14	Kali Christ	(Canada)	16	24	16	28	36		120
15	Li Qishi	(China)	25	50	18				93
16	Zhao Xin	(China)	15	16	8	16	14	18	87
17	Gabriele Hirschbichler	(Germany)	10	19	14		16	16	75
18	Antoinette de Jong	(Netherlands)			25	36			61
19	Katarzyna Woźniak	(Poland)	8	11	11	14	10		54
20	Noh Seon-yeong	(South Korea)		25	6	10	12		53
21	Kim Bo-reum	(South Korea)	6	15	5	8	18		52
22	Ivanie Blondin	(Canada)				25	24		49
23	Nao Kodaira	(Japan)	32	14					46
24	Melissa Wijfje	(Netherlands)	19	21					40
25	Karolína Erbanová	(Czech Republic)	18	12	10				40
26	Carlijn Achtereekte	(Netherlands)					25	14	39
27	Hege Bøkko	(Norway)			19	12	6		37
28	Margarita Ryzhova	(Russia)	12	5	6	6	6		35
29	Jelena Peeters	(Belgium)	8	8		8			24
30	Tatyana Mikhailova	(Belarus)				15	8		23
31	Isabell Ost	(Germany)			15	5	2		22
32	Misaki Oshigiri	(Japan)	11	10					21
33	Olga Fatkulina	(Russia)	14			6			20
34	Sanneke de Neeling	(Netherlands)				19			19
34	Jorien Voorhuis	(Netherlands)					19		19
36	Maki Tabata	(Japan)			8	11			19
37	Diane Valkenburg	(Netherlands)					15		15
38	Miho Takagi	(Japan)					11		11
39	Liu Jing	(China)	2	6	2		1		11
40	Park Cho-weon	(South Korea)	1	8		1			10
41	Claudia Pechstein	(Germany)					8		8
42	Bente Kraus	(Germany)	6						6
43	Saori Toi	(Japan)		2		4			6
44	Aleksandra Goss	(Poland)	5						5
45	Yekaterina Aydova	(Kazakhstan)					4		4
45	Anna Chernova	(Russia)		4					4
45	Roxanne Dufter	(Germany)			4				4
45	Aleksandra Kachurkina	(Russia)	4						4
49	Francesca Lollobrigida	(Italy)				2			2
50	Josie Spence	(Canada)		1					1
50	Marina Zueva	(Belarus)			1				1
