= 2016 World Single Distances Speed Skating Championships – Women's 1000 metres =

Women's 1000 metres at the 2016 World Single Distances Speed Skating Championships
- Venue: Kolomna Speed Skating Center, Kolomna
- Date: 12 February
- Competitors: 24 from 12 nations
- Winning time: 1:14.73

Medalists
gold medal	Jorien ter Mors	Netherlands
silver medal	Heather Richardson-Bergsma	United States
bronze medal	Brittany Bowe	United States

The Women's 1000 metres race of the 2016 World Single Distances Speed Skating Championships was held on 12 February 2016.

== Results ==
The race was started at 17:09.

Rank	Pair	Lane	Name	Country	Time	Diff
1st place, gold medalist(s)	7	o	Jorien ter Mors	NED	1:14.73	
2nd place, silver medalist(s)	11	i	Heather Richardson-Bergsma	USA	1:14.94	+0.21
3rd place, bronze medalist(s)	12	o	Brittany Bowe	USA	1:15.01	+0.27
4	9	o	Vanessa Bittner	AUT	1:15.51	+0.78
5	11	o	Zhang Hong	CHN	1:15.70	+0.97
6	1	o	Ireen Wüst	NED	1:15.71	+0.98
7	12	i	Marrit Leenstra	NED	1:15.77	+1.04
8	7	i	Miho Takagi	JPN	1:15.85	+1.12
9	9	i	Ida Njåtun	NOR	1:16.24	+1.51
10	3	o	Hege Bøkko	NOR	1:16.27	+1.54
11	10	o	Li Qishi	CHN	1:16.29	+1.56
12	10	i	Olga Fatkulina	RUS	1:16.35	+1.62
13	8	o	Karolína Erbanová	CZE	1:16.80	+2.07
14	6	i	Gabriele Hirschbichler	GER	1:16.86	+2.13
15	3	i	Kaylin Irvine	CAN	1:16.86	+2.13
16	5	i	Ayaka Kikuchi	JPN	1:16.89	+2.16
17	2	i	Natalia Czerwonka	POL	1:17.02	+2.29
18	4	i	Yekaterina Aydova	KAZ	1:17.14	+2.41
19	6	o	Roxanne Dufter	GER	1:17.33	+2.60
20	4	o	Sugar Todd	USA	1:17.62	+2.89
21	8	i	Yekaterina Shikhova	RUS	1:18.19	+3.46
22	1	i	Elizaveta Kazelina	RUS	1:18.21	+3.48
23	2	o	Nikola Zdráhalová	CZE	1:19.38	+4.65
24	5	o	Yu Jing	CHN		DSQ
