= 2016 World Single Distances Speed Skating Championships – Women's 500 metres =

Women's 500 metres at the 2016 World Single Distances Speed Skating Championships
- Venue: Kolomna Speed Skating Center, Kolomna
- Date: 13 February 2016
- Competitors: 24 from 13 nations
- Winning time: 74.859

Medalists
gold medal	Lee Sang-hwa	South Korea
silver medal	Brittany Bowe	United States
bronze medal	Zhang Hong	China

The women's 500 metres race of the 2016 World Single Distances Speed Skating Championships was held on 13 February 2016.

== Results ==
The first run was started at 17:01 and the second run at 18:36.

Rank	Name	Country	Pair	Lane	Race 1	Pair	Lane	Race 2	Total	Diff
1st place, gold medalist(s)	Lee Sang-hwa	KOR	12	i	37.421	12	o	37.438	74.859	
2nd place, silver medalist(s)	Brittany Bowe	USA	11	i	37.923	10	o	37.740	75.663	+0.804
3rd place, bronze medalist(s)	Zhang Hong	CHN	12	o	37.782	12	i	37.906	75.688	+0.829
4	Jorien ter Mors	NED	5	o	37.825	10	i	37.903	75.728	+0.869
5	Heather Richardson-Bergsma	USA	11	o	37.819	11	i	37.968	75.787	+0.928
6	Nao Kodaira	JPN	7	o	37.907	9	i	38.081	75.988	+1.129
7	Olga Fatkulina	RUS	10	o	38.005	7	i	37.994	75.999	+1.140
8	Yu Jing	CHN	9	o	38.003	8	i	38.043	76.046	+1.187
9	Heather McLean	CAN	10	i	37.901	11	o	38.276	76.177	+1.318
10	Vanessa Bittner	AUT	9	i	38.116	9	o	38.128	76.244	+1.385
11	Margot Boer	NED	6	i	38.301	6	o	38.313	76.614	+1.755
12	Erina Kamiya	JPN	8	o	38.153	6	i	38.479	76.632	+1.773
13	Maki Tsuji	JPN	8	i	38.259	8	o	38.433	76.692	+1.833
14	Karolína Erbanová	CZE	7	i	38.269	7	o	38.506	76.775	+1.916
15	Nadezhda Aseyeva	RUS	4	o	38.599	4	i	38.381	76.980	+2.121
16	Marsha Hudey	CAN	6	o	38.440	5	i	38.585	77.025	+2.166
17	Sugar Todd	USA	5	i	38.617	5	o	38.667	77.284	+2.425
18	Janine Smit	NED	3	i	38.699	4	o	38.714	77.413	+2.554
19	Yekaterina Aydova	KAZ	4	i	39.272	3	o	38.425	77.697	+2.838
20	Hege Bøkko	NOR	1	o	38.917	3	i	38.883	77.800	+2.941
21	Li Qishi	CHN	3	o	38.978	2	i	38.978	77.956	+3.097
22	Yvonne Daldossi	ITA	2	i	39.275	2	o	39.122	78.397	+3.538
23	Shannon Rempel	CAN	2	o	39.095	1	i	39.418	78.513	+3.654
24	Elina Risku	FIN	1	i	39.571	1	o	40.084	79.655	+4.796
