= 2019 World Single Distances Speed Skating Championships – Women's 1000 metres =

Women's 1000 metres at the 2019 World Single Distances Speed Skating Championships
- Venue: Max Aicher Arena
- Location: Inzell, Germany
- Dates: 9 February
- Competitors: 24 from 14 nations
- Winning time: 1:13.41

Medalists
| gold medal | Brittany Bowe | United States |
| silver medal | Vanessa Herzog | Austria |
| bronze medal | Nao Kodaira | Japan |

The Women's 1000 metres competition at the 2019 World Single Distances Speed Skating Championships was held on 9 February 2019.

== Results ==
The race was started at 15:06.

| Rank | Pair | Lane | Name | Country | Time | Diff |
|---|---|---|---|---|---|---|
| 1st place, gold medalist(s) | 11 | i | Brittany Bowe | United States | 1:13.41 | |
| 2nd place, silver medalist(s) | 12 | o | Vanessa Herzog | Austria | 1:14.38 | +0.97 |
| 3rd place, bronze medalist(s) | 11 | o | Nao Kodaira | Japan | 1:14.44 | +1.03 |
| 4 | 10 | i | Miho Takagi | Japan | 1:14.58 | +1.17 |
| 5 | 9 | i | Jutta Leerdam | Netherlands | 1:14.63 | +1.22 |
| 6 | 6 | o | Antoinette de Jong | Netherlands | 1:14.70 | +1.29 |
| 7 | 9 | o | Yekaterina Shikhova | Russia | 1:14.88 | +1.47 |
| 8 | 1 | o | Sanneke de Neeling | Netherlands | 1:14.95 | +1.54 |
| 9 | 10 | o | Olga Fatkulina | Russia | 1:15.09 | +1.68 |
| 10 | 8 | o | Li Qishi | China | 1:15.55 | +2.14 |
| 11 | 12 | i | Daria Kachanova | Russia | 1:15.64 | +2.23 |
| 12 | 4 | o | Heather McLean | Canada | 1:15.66 | +2.25 |
| 13 | 3 | o | Gabriele Hirschbichler | Germany | 1:15.85 | +2.44 |
| 14 | 3 | i | Kim Hyun-yung | South Korea | 1:15.883 | +2.47 |
| 15 | 4 | i | Kimi Goetz | United States | 1:15.884 | +2.47 |
| 16 | 7 | i | Natalia Czerwonka | Poland | 1:15.91 | +2.50 |
| 17 | 5 | i | Zhao Xin | China | 1:16.27 | +2.86 |
| 18 | 7 | o | Maki Tsuji | Japan | 1:16.29 | +2.88 |
| 19 | 6 | i | Hege Bøkko | Norway | 1:16.34 | +2.93 |
| 20 | 2 | o | Noemi Bonazza | Italy | 1:16.50 | +3.09 |
| 21 | 1 | i | Huang Yu-ting | Chinese Taipei | 1:17.36 | +3.95 |
| 22 | 5 | o | Jin Jingzhu | China | 1:17.42 | +4.01 |
| 23 | 2 | i | Anne Gulbrandsen | Norway | 1:18.48 | +5.07 |
| 24 | 8 | i | Yekaterina Aydova | Kazakhstan | 1:54.81 | +41.40 |
