= 2015 World Single Distance Speed Skating Championships – Women's 1000 metres =

Women's 1000 metres at the 2015 World Single Distance Speed Skating Championships
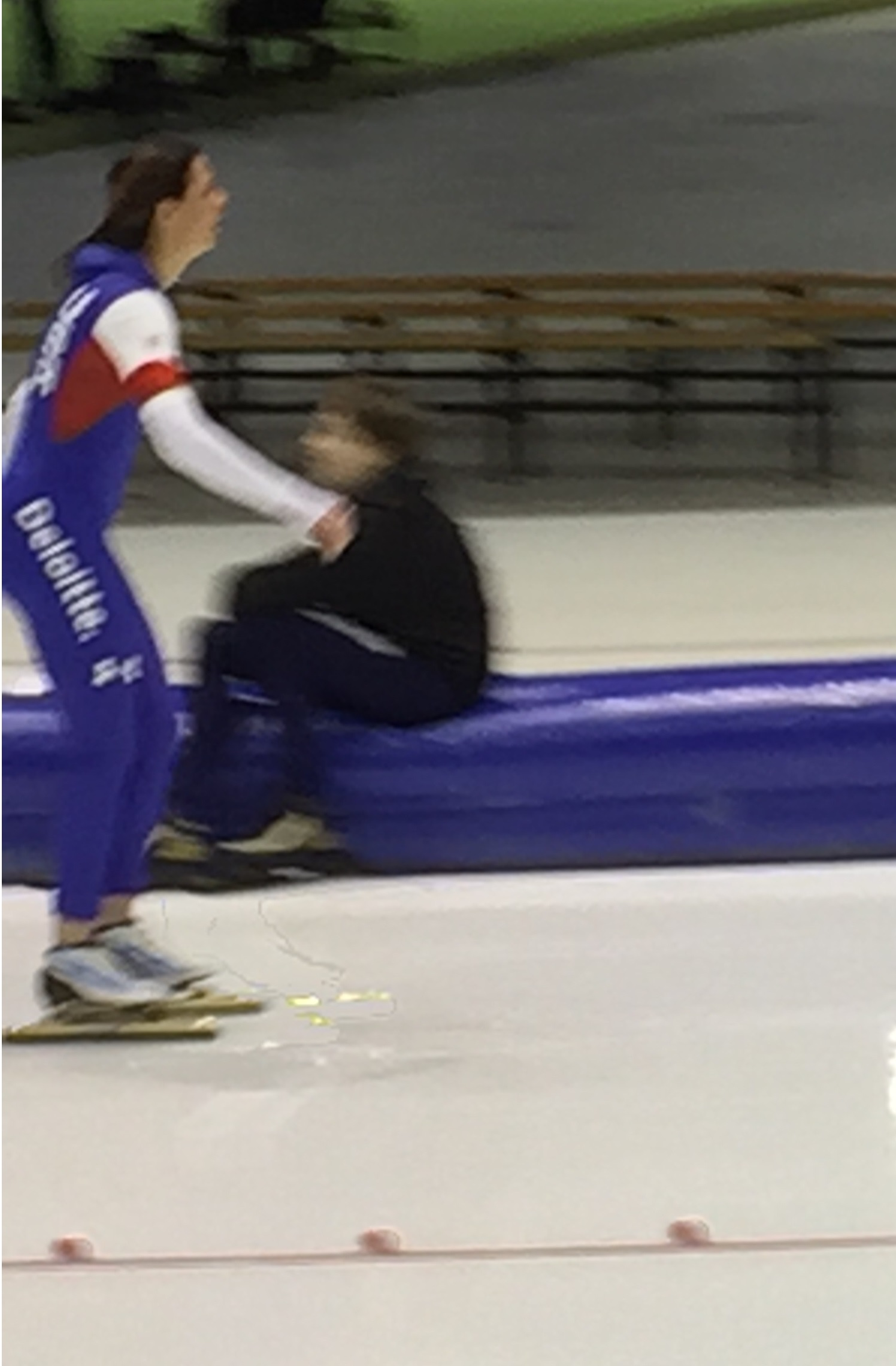
- Event winner Bowe
- Venue: Thialf, Heerenveen
- Date: 13 February 2015
- Competitors: 23 from 12 nations
- Winning time: 1:13.90

Medalists
gold medal	Brittany Bowe	United States
silver medal	Heather Richardson	United States
bronze medal	Karolína Erbanová	Czech Republic

The women's 1000 metres race of the 2015 World Single Distance Speed Skating Championships was held on 13 February 2015.

== Results ==
The race was started at 18:00.

Rank	Pair	Lane	Name	Country	Time	Diff	Notes
1st place, gold medalist(s)	10	o	Brittany Bowe	USA	1:13.90		TR
2nd place, silver medalist(s)	9	o	Heather Richardson	USA	1:14.49	+0.40	
3rd place, bronze medalist(s)	12	o	Karolína Erbanová	CZE	1:15.26	+1.36	
4	12	i	Ireen Wüst	NED	1:15.50	+1.60	
5	11	o	Li Qishi	CHN	1:15.65	+1.75	
6	5	o	Kali Christ	CAN	1:15.74	+1.84	
7	11	i	Marrit Leenstra	NED	1:15.84	+1.94	
8	8	o	Judith Hesse	GER	1:15.86	+1.96	
9	7	i	Vanessa Bittner	AUT	1:16.08	+2.18	
10	8	i	Laurine van Riessen	NED	1:16.15	+2.25	
11	10	i	Nao Kodaira	JPN	1:16.28	+2.38	
12	5	i	Yekaterina Aydova	KAZ	1:16.39	+2.49	
13	9	i	Olga Fatkulina	RUS	1:16.57	+2.67	
14	6	i	Park Seung-hi	KOR	1:17.23	+3.33	
15	7	o	Ida Njåtun	NOR	1:17.24	+3.34	
16	6	o	Yuliya Skokova	RUS	1:17.25	+3.35	
17	4	o	Gabriele Hirschbichler	GER	1:17.28	+3.38	
18	4	i	Ayaka Kikuchi	JPN	1:17.55	+3.65	
19	2	o	Margarita Ryzhova	RUS	1:17.76	+3.86	
20	2	i	Li Huawei	CHN	1:18.23	+4.33	
21	3	o	Miyako Sumiyoshi	JPN	1:18.35	+4.45	
22	1	i	Jessica Gregg	CAN	1:18.94	+5.04	
23	3	i	Liu Yichi	CHN	1:19.29	+5.39	
