= 2018 World Sprint Speed Skating Championships =

International speed skating competition

- Location: Changchun, China
- Venue: Jilin Provincial Speed Skating Rink
- Dates: 3–4 March

Medalist men
1st place, gold medalist(s)		Håvard Holmefjord Lorentzen	Norway
2nd place, silver medalist(s)		Kjeld Nuis	Netherlands
3rd place, bronze medalist(s)		Kai Verbij	Netherlands

Medalist women
1st place, gold medalist(s)		Jorien ter Mors	Netherlands
2nd place, silver medalist(s)		Brittany Bowe	United States
3rd place, bronze medalist(s)		Olga Fatkulina	Russia

The 2018 World Sprint Speed Skating Championships were held at the Jilin Provincial Speed Skating Rink in Changchun, China, from 3 to 4 March 2018.

== Schedule ==
All times are local (UTC+8).

Date	Time	Event
3 March	17:00	500 m women
3 March	17:00	500 m men
3 March	17:00	1000 m women
3 March	17:00	1000 m men
4 March	16:00	500 m women
4 March	16:00	500 m men
4 March	16:00	1000 m women
4 March	16:00	1000 m men

== Medal summary ==
=== Medal table ===
Rank	Nation	Gold	Silver	Bronze	Total
1	Netherlands (NED)	1	1	1	3
2	Norway (NOR)	1	0	0	1
3	United States (USA)	0	1	0	1
4	Russia (RUS)	0	0	1	1
Totals (4 entries)		2	2	2	6

=== Medalists ===
Event	Gold		Silver		Bronze	
Men	Håvard Holmefjord Lorentzen; Norway	139.360	Kjeld Nuis; Netherlands	139.510	Kai Verbij; Netherlands	139.535
Women	Jorien ter Mors; Netherlands	150.375	Brittany Bowe; United States	151.915	Olga Fatkulina; Russia	152.620
