= Brittany Bowe =

American speed skater (born 1988)

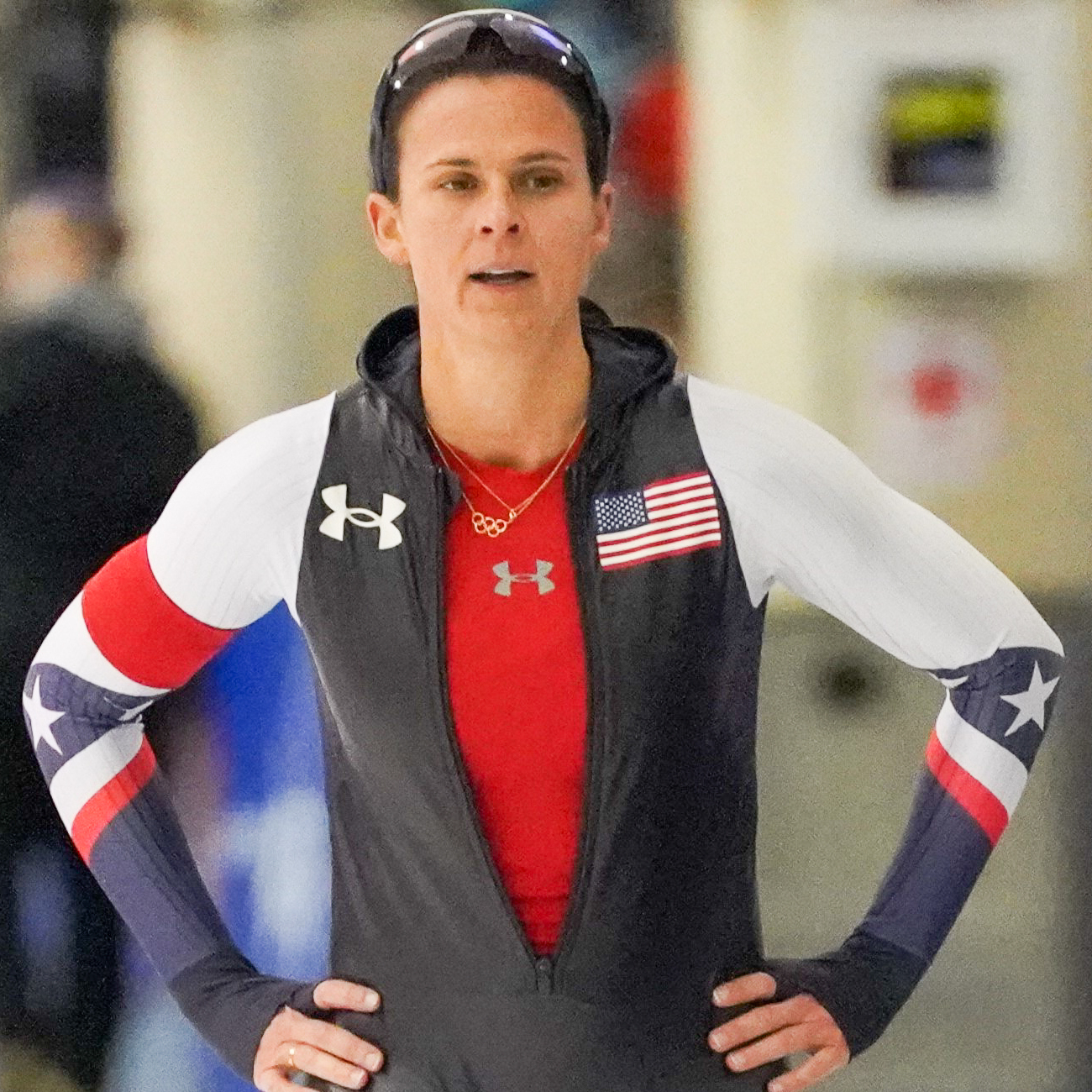
- Bowe in 2026

Personal information
- Born: Brittany Starr Bowe; February 24, 1988 (age 38) Ocala, Florida, U.S.
- Height: 5 ft 7 in (170 cm)
- Weight: 145 lb (66 kg)

Sport
- Country: United States
- Sport: Speed skating
- Events: 500 m, 1000 m, 1500 m
- Coached by: Ryan Shimabukuro
Medal record
Representing the United States
Women's speed skating
Olympic Games
Bronze medal – third place	2018 Pyeongchang	Team pursuit
Bronze medal – third place	2022 Beijing	1000 m
World Sprint Championships
Gold medal – first place	2015 Astana	Sprint
Gold medal – first place	2016 Seoul	Sprint
Silver medal – second place	2018 Changchun	Sprint
Bronze medal – third place	2019 Heerenveen	Sprint
World Single Distances Championships
Gold medal – first place	2015 Heerenveen	1000 m
Gold medal – first place	2015 Heerenveen	1500 m
Gold medal – first place	2019 Inzell	1000 m
Gold medal – first place	2021 Heerenveen	1000 m
Silver medal – second place	2015 Heerenveen	500 m
Silver medal – second place	2016 Kolomna	500 m
Silver medal – second place	2021 Heerenveen	1500 m
Silver medal – second place	2024 Calgary	Team sprint
Bronze medal – third place	2013 Sochi	1000 m
Bronze medal – third place	2016 Kolomna	1000 m
Bronze medal – third place	2016 Kolomna	1500 m
Bronze medal – third place	2019 Inzell	1500 m
Bronze medal – third place	2023 Heerenveen	Team pursuit
Four Continents Championships
Gold medal – first place	2025 Hachinohe	1000 m
Silver medal – second place	2024 Salt Lake City	Team sprint
Women's inline speed skating
World Championships (road)
Gold medal – first place	2006 Anyang	5000 m relay
Gold medal – first place	2007 Cali	500 m
Gold medal – first place	2007 Cali	5000 m relay
Gold medal – first place	2008 Gijón	5000 m relay
Bronze medal – third place	2007 Cali	200 m
World Championships (track)
Gold medal – first place	2006 Anyang	3000 m relay
Gold medal – first place	2007 Cali	3000 m relay
Gold medal – first place	2008 Gijón	300 m
Gold medal – first place	2008 Gijón	3000 m relay
Silver medal – second place	2008 Gijón	1000 m
Bronze medal – third place	2008 Gijón	500 m
Pan American Games
Gold medal – first place	2007 Rio de Janeiro	Combined sprint

Brittany Starr Bowe (born February 24, 1988) is an American speed skater and former inline skater and basketball player. She has won eight gold, one silver, and two bronze medals from the world inline speedskating championships. From her junior years, she has another 21 world championship medals. She also has a gold medal from the combined sprint event in roller skating at the 2007 Pan American Games.

In speed skating, she has specialized in the 500, 1000 and 1500 meters, and she won the bronze medal on the 1000 meters distance in the 2013 World Single Distance Championships. In the 2015 World Single Distance Championships, she won the gold medal on the same distance, as well as another gold medal in the 1500 meters, and the silver medal in the 500 meters. Two weeks later, she also won the 2015 World Sprint Championships, winning all four races along the way. She has two bronze medals, from the 2018 and 2022 Olympics.

For her performance in the 1000 metres competition of the Single Distance Championships, Bowe was awarded the 2015 Oscar Mathisen Award.

Bowe is the current world record holder in the 1000 meters distance, and has previously held the 1500 meters world record, in which distance she holds the American record.

== Early life ==
Bowe was born in Ocala, Florida, to Michael and Deborah Bowe (née Starr), and grew up practicing several sports from an early age, including basketball and soccer. At the age of 2, she would give dribbling exhibitions at halftime of college basketball games. Though making it to a statewide under-13 boys travel team in soccer, she gave that sport up, because of overlapping seasons with basketball.

She attended the Trinity Catholic High School in Ocala, and then Florida Atlantic University in Boca Raton, where she played basketball for the Florida Atlantic Owls. She graduated in 2010, majoring in sociology and social science.

== Inline speed skating ==
In 1996, at the age of 8, Bowe began inline skating. She competed at increasingly higher levels, ultimately participating in world championships from 2002 to 2008, where she won 32 medals altogether. At the senior level, Bowe made her debut at the 2008 World Inline Speed Skating Championships in Gijón, Spain, where she was selected for the U.S. national team after qualifying at the 2008 Inline Speed Skating National Championships in Colorado Springs, Colorado.

Bowe is a 13-time medalist at the World Single Distances Championships (four gold, four silver, and five bronze). She has won medals four times at the World Sprint Championships (two gold, one silver, one bronze). Beyond the world championships, Bowe represented the United States at the 2007 Pan American Games in Rio de Janeiro, where she won a gold medal in the combined sprint event in roller sports.

After the 2008 world championships in inline speed skating, Bowe shifted focus to her basketball career, playing as a point guard for the Florida Atlantic Owls. Watching former inline skating contemporaries Chad Hedrick and Heather Richardson compete at the 2010 Winter Olympics, she was inspired to transition to speed skating and moved to Salt Lake City in 2010 to pursue the sport full time.

== Basketball ==
After the 2008 world championships in inline speed skating, Bowe focused on her basketball game, playing as a point guard for the Florida Atlantic Owls.

=== Florida Atlantic statistics ===
Legend
GP	Games played	GS	Games started	MPG	Minutes per game
FG%	Field goal percentage	3P%	3-point field goal percentage	FT%	Free throw percentage
RPG	Rebounds per game	APG	Assists per game	SPG	Steals per game
BPG	Blocks per game	PPG	Points per game	**Bold**	Career high

Year	Team	GP	Points	FG%	3P%	FT%	RPG	APG	SPG	BPG	PPG
2006–07	Florida Atlantic	**30**	161	32.4%	28.1%	56.4%	2.2	0.9	1.0	0.1	5.4
2007–08	Florida Atlantic	28	244	29.2%	**26.9%**	62.5%	3.3	4.1	1.5	0.1	8.7
2008–09	Florida Atlantic	29	316	33.8%	11.4%	**72.0%**	3.9	3.7	**2.1**	-	10.9
2009–10	Florida Atlantic	29	**354**	**40.3%**	12.5%	70.0%	**4.1**	**4.7**	1.7	0.0	**12.2**
Career		116	1075	34.2%	21.7%	67.0%	3.3	3.3	1.6	0.0	9.3

== Speed skating ==
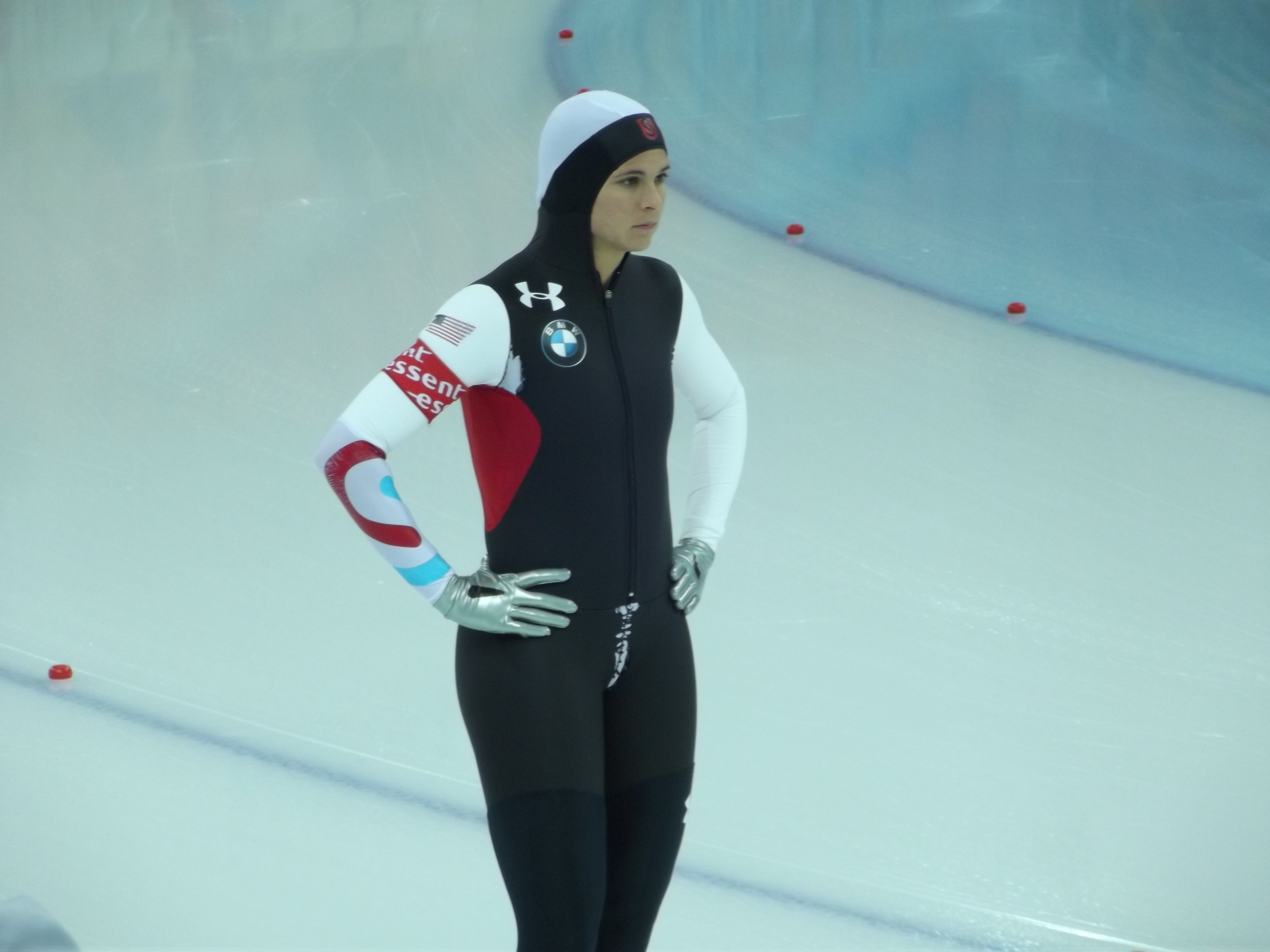
Bowe at the World Single Distance Championships in Sochi, Russia, in March 2013

Watching friends from the inline years, such as Chad Hedrick and Heather Richardson, participating in the 2010 Winter Olympics, Bowe decided to pause her basketball career, and moved to Salt Lake City in 2010 to take up speed skating.

She soon enjoyed success, and on January 19 and 20, 2013, she earned her first podium placings in the ISU Speed Skating World Cup, finishing third in both races over the 1000 metres distance at the World Cup stop in Calgary, Alberta, Canada. Six weeks later, on March 3, she won her first World Cup gold medal in the 1000 metres at the World Cup stop in Erfurt, Germany. Overall, she finished second in the women's 1000 metres World Cup, after Heather Richardson.

On March 23, 2013, Bowe won her first world championship medal in speed skating, a bronze, in the women's 1000 metres distance of the World Single Distance Championships, finishing behind Olga Fatkulina of Russia and Ireen Wüst of the Netherlands.

On November 17, 2013, Bowe set a new world record on 1000 meters with a time of 1:12.58 in the World Cup stop in Salt Lake City. Over the 2013–14 World Cup season, she collected a total of five podium placings in the 1000 metres World Cup, one gold, three silver, and one bronze medal, for an overall silver medal, behind Heather Richardson. In the 1500 metres World Cup, Bowe collected one gold, one silver, and one bronze medal, for an overall bronze medal, behind Dutch skaters Ireen Wüst and Lotte van Beek.

The 2014 Winter Olympics in Sochi, Russia, was somewhat of a disappointment, with Bowe finishing 13th in the 500 metres, 8th in the 1000 metres, and 14th in the 1500 metres.

In the 2015 World Single Distance Championships, she won gold medals in the 1000 and 1500 meters, and a silver in the 500 meters. She also won the 2015 World Sprint Championships.

Over the 2014–15 World Cup season, Bowe collected four podium placings, three silver and one bronze, for an overall 5th place in the 500 metres World Cup, five podium placings, three gold and two silver, for an overall win in 1000 metres World Cup, and three podium placings, one gold and two silver, for an overall bronze medal in the 1500 metres World Cup.

Bowe competed in the 500m, 1000m , and 1500m individual events at the 2018 PyeongChang Olympics. She earned a bronze medal in the team pursuit event.

In 2022 Olympic qualifications for the United States speed skating team, fellow speed skater and longtime friend to Bowe, Erin Jackson, slipped during the 500m race. Though Bowe had earned a qualification spot for this distance, she gave up her spot to Jackson, as Jackson was considered a favorite. Jackson went on to win the gold medal in the 2022 Olympics for this event. Bowe was selected to be a flag bearer for the United States during the opening ceremony after the original bearer, Elana Meyers Taylor, tested positive for COVID-19. Bowe earned a bronze medal in the 1000m event.

Prior to the 2026 Olympics, Bowe announced that they would be her last. She competed in the 1000m, 1500m, and team pursuit events, finishing fourth in all three events.

=== Records ===
==== Personal records ====
Personal records
Speed skating
Event	Result	Date	Location	Notes
500 m	37.03	November 20, 2015	Utah Olympic Oval, Salt Lake City	
1000 m	1:11.61	March 9, 2019	Utah Olympic Oval, Salt Lake City	Current world record.
1500 m	1:50.32	March 10, 2019	Utah Olympic Oval, Salt Lake City	
3000 m	4:13.99	November 2, 2012	Pettit National Ice Center, Milwaukee	

==== World records ====
World records
Speed skating
Event	Result	Date	Location	Notes
1000 m	1:12.58	November 17, 2013	Utah Olympic Oval, Salt Lake City	World record until beaten by Heather Richardson-Bergsma on November 14, 2015.
1000 m	1:12.18	November 22, 2015	Utah Olympic Oval, Salt Lake City	World record until beaten by Nao Kodaira on December 10, 2017.
1500 m	1:51.59	November 15, 2015	Olympic Oval, Calgary	World record until beaten by Heather Richardson-Bergsma on November 21, 2015.
1000 m	1:11.61	March 9, 2019	Utah Olympic Oval, Salt Lake City	Current world record.

=== Results timeline ===
Season	World Sprint	World SD	World Cup	Olympic Games
2011–12	18th	16th 2x500 m 8th 1000 m	20th 500 m 10th 1000 m 31st 1500 m	Not held
2012–13	8th	14th 2x500 m (bronze) 1000 m	15th 500 m (silver) 1000 m 28th 1500 m	Not held
2013–14	Did not participate	Not held	11th 500 m (silver) 1000 m (bronze) 1500 m 3rd GWC	13th 2x500 m 8th 1000 m 14th 1500 m 6th team pursuit
2014–15	1st place, gold medalist(s)	(silver) 2x500 m (gold) 1000 m (gold) 1500 m	5th 500 m (gold) 1000 m (bronze) 1500 m 28th mass start 3rd GWC	Not held
2015–16	1st place, gold medalist(s)	(silver) 2x500 m (bronze) 1000 m (bronze) 1500 m		Not held
2017-2018	2nd place, silver medalist(s)			5th 500m 4th 1000m 5th 1500m (bronze) Team Pursuit
2021-2022	Did not participate	(gold) 1000 m (gold) 1500 m	(gold) 1000 m (silver) 1500 m	(bronze) 1000m 10th 1500m
2024–25	Did not participate		15th, 7th 500 m 5th, (silver) , 5th, 6th 1000 m 6th, 6th, 11th, 11th 1500 m (bronze) , (bronze) Team pursuit	Not held
2025–26			5th, 5th, 4th, 4th, 4th 1000 m 6th, (bronze) , 4th, 5th, 5th 1500 m (bronze) , 4th, (silver) Team pursuit	4th 1000m 4th 1500m 4th Team Pursuit

=== World Cup overall trophy ===
Season	1000 meter	Points	1500 meter	Points
2015–2016		710		590
2018–2019		397		378
2019–2020		326	—N/a	
2020–2021		120		120
2021–2022		330		256
2023–2024		297	—N/a	
2024–2025		256	—N/a	
2025–2026		209	—N/a	

== Personal life ==
Bowe is a lesbian and began dating ice hockey player Hilary Knight in 2022. They got engaged during the 2026 Winter Olympics.

Records
Preceded by (Canada) Christine Nesbitt (United States) Heather Richardson-Bergsma (Japan) Nao Kodaira	Women's 1000 m speed skating world record November 17, 2013 – November 14, 2015; November 22, 2015 – December 10, 2017; March 9, 2019 – present	Succeeded by (United States) Heather Richardson-Bergsma (Japan) Nao Kodaira; Current holder
Preceded by (Canada) Cindy Klassen	Women's 1500 m speed skating world record November 15, 2015 – November 21, 2015	Succeeded by (United States) Heather Richardson-Bergsma
