= 2013–14 ISU Speed Skating World Cup – Women's 1500 metres =

The 1500 meters distance for women in the 2013–14 ISU Speed Skating World Cup was contested over six races on six occasions, out of a total of six World Cup occasions for the season, with the first occasion taking place in Calgary, Alberta, Canada, on 8–10 November 2013, and the final occasion taking place in Heerenveen, Netherlands, on 14–16 March 2014.

Ireen Wüst of the Netherlands won the cup, while compatriot Lotte van Beek came second, and Brittany Bowe of the United States came third. The defending champion, Marrit Leenstra of the Netherlands, ended up in fifth place.

== Top three ==
Position	Athlete	Points	Previous season
1	(Netherlands) Ireen Wüst	530	3rd
2	(Netherlands) Lotte van Beek	430	5th
3	(United States) Brittany Bowe	389	28th

== Race medallists ==
Occasion #	Location	Date	Gold	Time	Silver	Time	Bronze	Time	Report
1	Calgary, Alberta, Canada	9 November	Lotte van Beek; Netherlands	1:52.95	Ireen Wüst; Netherlands	1:53.30	Martina Sáblíková; Czech Republic	1:54.44	
2	Salt Lake City, United States	16 November	Ireen Wüst; Netherlands	1:52.08	Brittany Bowe; United States	1:52.45	Heather Richardson; United States	1:52.55	
3	Astana, Kazakhstan	30 November	Brittany Bowe; United States	1.57.28	Yuliya Skokova; Russia	1.57.70	Brittany Schussler; Canada	1.57.78	
4	Berlin, Germany	7 December	Ireen Wüst; Netherlands	1:55.33	Katarzyna Bachleda-Curuś; Poland	1:55.93	Lotte van Beek; Netherlands	1:56.28	
5	Inzell, Germany	7 March	Ireen Wüst; Netherlands	1:54.03	Lotte van Beek; Netherlands	1:54.70	Brittany Bowe; United States	1:55.06	
6	Heerenveen, Netherlands	14 March	Ireen Wüst; Netherlands	1:53.68	Lotte van Beek; Netherlands	1:54.47	Yuliya Skokova; Russia	1:56.14	

== Standings ==
Standings as of 14 March 2014 (end of the season).

#	Name	Nat.	CAL	SLC	AST	BER	INZ	HVN	Total
1	Ireen Wüst	(Netherlands)	80	100		100	100	150	530
2	Lotte van Beek	(Netherlands)	100	60		70	80	120	430
3	Brittany Bowe	(United States)	19	80	100	45	70	75	389
4	Yuliya Skokova	(Russia)	32	50	80	16	60	105	343
5	Marrit Leenstra	(Netherlands)	60			60	32	90	242
6	Katarzyna Bachleda-Curuś	(Poland)	24	45	12	80	18	36	215
7	Yekaterina Lobysheva	(Russia)	50	40		40	50	24	204
8	Ida Njåtun	(Norway)	45	36	32	36		32	181
9	Olga Graf	(Russia)	12		60	12	36	45	165
10	Monique Angermüller	(Germany)	21	32	40	18	28	16	155
11	Luiza Złotkowska	(Poland)	16	18	50	28	21	18	151
12	Claudia Pechstein	(Germany)	36	24	45	32			137
13	Jorien Voorhuis	(Netherlands)	18	16		19	40	40	133
14	Yekaterina Shikhova	(Russia)	28	28		50	12	14	132
15	Brittany Schussler	(Canada)	8	19	70	24			121
16	Martina Sáblíková	(Czech Republic)	70	5			45		120
17	Heather Richardson	(United States)	25	70			24		119
18	Natalia Czerwonka	(Poland)		25	14	10	16	28	93
19	Karolína Erbanová	(Czech Republic)	6	11	36	21	14		88
20	Maki Tabata	(Japan)	15	21	21	6	8	12	83
21	Ayaka Kikuchi	(Japan)	10	6	24	14	6	8	68
22	Nana Takagi	(Japan)	11	12	16	5	5	10	59
23	Christine Nesbitt	(Canada)	40	14					54
24	Jilleanne Rookard	(United States)	1	15	28	8			52
25	Diane Valkenburg	(Netherlands)					25	21	46
26	Kali Christ	(Canada)	14	10		15			39
27	Kim Bo-reum	(South Korea)	5	2	25				32
28	Annouk van der Weijden	(Netherlands)	6	6	18				30
29	Yevgeniya Dmitriyeva	(Russia)			19		10		29
30	Gabriele Hirschbichler	(Germany)	8	8	10				26
31	Jorien ter Mors	(Netherlands)				25			25
32	Nao Kodaira	(Japan)	2	8	8	2			20
33	Miho Takagi	(Japan)					19		19
34	Jelena Peeters	(Belgium)				4	15		19
35	Noh Seon-yeong	(South Korea)	4	4	11				19
36	Laurine van Riessen	(Netherlands)			15				15
37	Olga Fatkulina	(Russia)		1		11			12
38	Zhao Xin	(China)			4	8			12
39	Misaki Oshigiri	(Japan)					11		11
40	Yuki Matsuda	(Japan)			8				8
40	Anna Ringsred	(United States)					8		8
42	Carlijn Achtereekte	(Netherlands)			6				6
42	Li Qishi	(China)				6			6
42	Isabell Ost	(Germany)					6		6
45	Mari Hemmer	(Norway)					4		4
46	Liu Jing	(China)			2				2
46	Francesca Lollobrigida	(Italy)					2		2
48	Anna Chernova	(Russia)			1				1
48	Katarzyna Woźniak	(Poland)					1		1
48	Yang Shin-young	(South Korea)				1			1
