= Thijsje Oenema =

Dutch speed skater

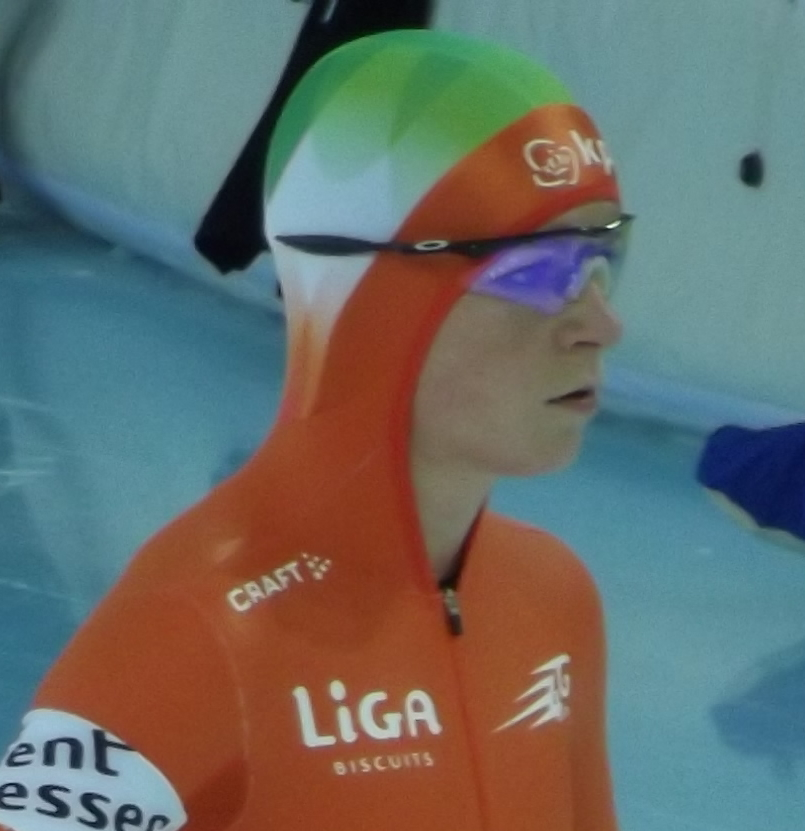
- Oenema in 2013

Personal information
- Born: 6 June 1988 (age 38) Heerenveen, Netherlands

Sport
- Country: Netherlands
- Sport: Speed skating
- Turned pro: 2005
- Retired: 2016
Medal record
Women's speed skating
Representing the Netherlands
World Championships
Bronze medal – third place	2012 Heerenveen	500 m

Thijsje Oenema (born 6 June 1988) is a Dutch speed skater and "short-track sprinter". She is specialised on the short distances.

Oenema skates for the VPZ skating team and is a member for skating club S.T.D. Sint Nicolaasga. Her breakthrough was during the 2009 KNSB Dutch Single Distance Championships, winning the bronze medal at the 500 m. This was very surprising because in the 2007–08 season she was not able to skate because of Pfeiffer's disease. With this third place she qualified for the first time for the World Cup.

Oenema also showed that season that she is also very strong at the 100 m. In 2006 and 2007 she was already the Dutch champion at this distance. In 2009, she regained her title she lost in the year before by winning on the ice of Lekkerkerk. In the same season she took the title at the Dutch championships supersprint.

Although her start of the season 2010 was weak, she managed to qualify for the Olympics in Vancouver by beating Marianne Timmer in a skate-off.

== Speed skating ==
=== Results ===
Season	Dutch SD	Dutch Sprint	World SD	World Sprint	World Cup	Olympics
2005–06	16th 2x500 m	Did not participate	Not held	Did not participate	Did not participate	Did not participate
2006–07	11th 2x500 m	Did not participate	Did not participate	Did not participate	Did not participate	Not held
2007–08	13th 2x500 m 16th 1000 m	Did not participate	Did not participate	Did not participate	Did not participate	Not held
2008–09	(bronze) 2x500 m	16th	Did not participate	Did not participate	(silver) 100 m 17th 500 m	Not held
2009–10	4th 2x500 m 9th 1000 m	Did not finish	Not held	Did not participate	8th 500 m	15th 2x500 m
2010–11	5th 2x500 m 18th 1000 m	5th	Did not participate	Did not participate	11th 500 m	Not held
2011–12	(gold) 2x500 m (gold) 1000 m 19th 1500 m	2nd place, silver medalist(s)	(bronze) 2x500 m	10th	5th 500 m 13th 1000 m	Not held
2012–13	(gold) 2x500 m 13th 1000 m	4th	5th 2x500 m	4th	6th 500 m	Not held
2013–14	(bronze) 2x500 m 10th 1000 m	3rd place, bronze medalist(s)	Not held	7th	8th 500 m 21st 1000 m 28th GWC	Did not participate
2014–15	(silver) 2x500 m 11th 1000 m	1st place, gold medalist(s)	4th 2x500 m	9th	7th 500 m 29th 1000 m 29th GWC	Not held

=== Medals ===
Championship	1st place, gold medalist(s)	2nd place, silver medalist(s)	3rd place, bronze medalist(s)
Dutch Single Distance	3	1	2
Dutch Sprint	1	1	1
World Single Distance	0	0	1
World Cup	0	1	0
