= Heather Bergsma =

American speed skater

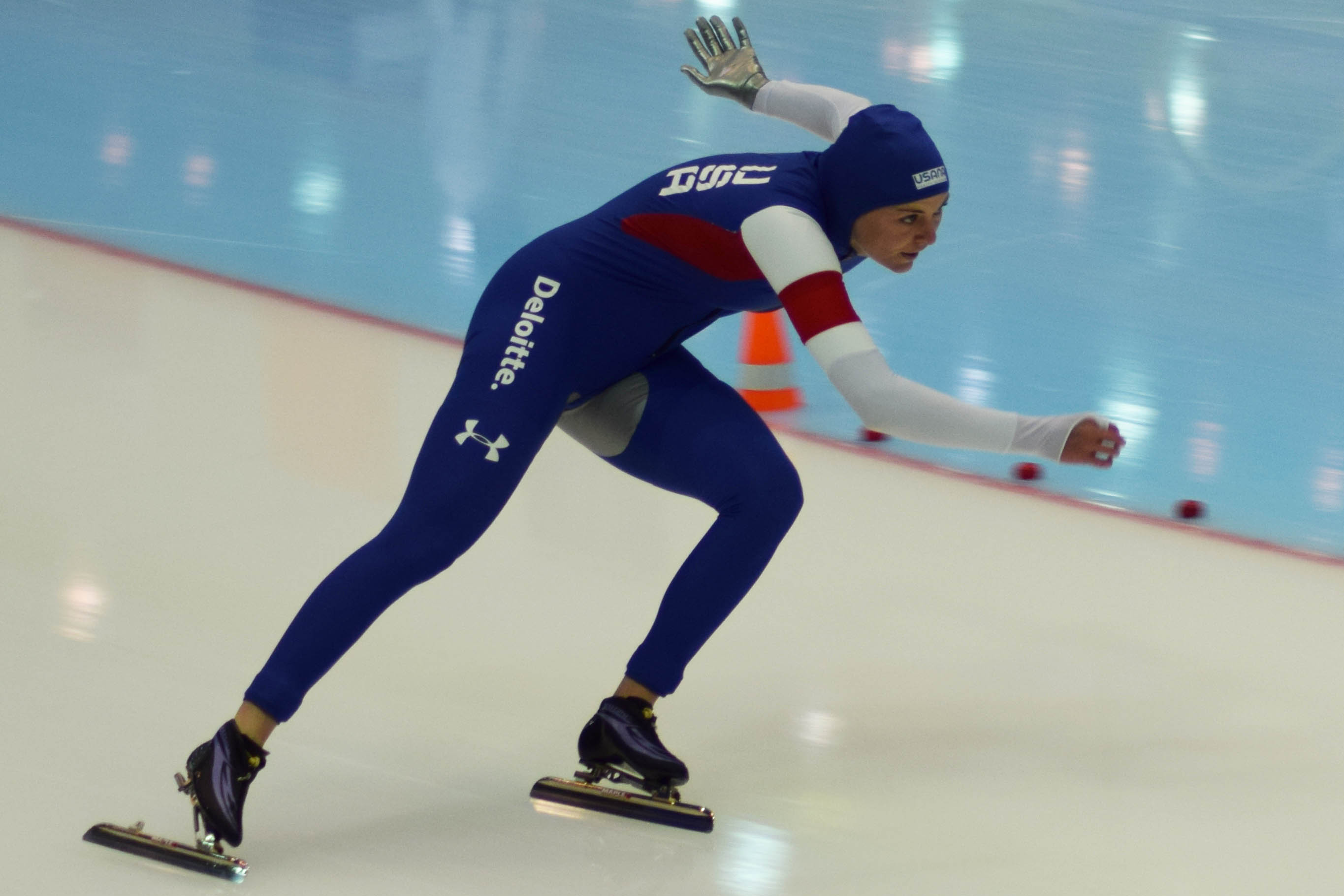
- 2016 WSD Speed Skating Championships

Personal information
- Born: Heather Richardson; March 20, 1989 (age 37) High Point, North Carolina, U.S.
- Height: 5 ft 10 in (178 cm)
- Weight: 149 lb (68 kg)
- Spouse: Jorrit Bergsma

Sport
- Country: United States
- Sport: Speed skating
Medal record
Women's speed skating
Representing the United States
Olympic Games
Bronze medal – third place	2018 Pyeongchang	Team pursuit
World Sprint Championships
Gold medal – first place	2013 Salt Lake City	Sprint
Silver medal – second place	2015 Astana	Sprint
Silver medal – second place	2016 Seoul	Sprint
Silver medal – second place	2017 Calgary	Sprint
Bronze medal – third place	2014 Nagano	Sprint
World Single Distances Championships
Gold medal – first place	2015 Heerenveen	500 m
Gold medal – first place	2017 Gangneung	1000 m
Gold medal – first place	2017 Gangneung	1500 m
Silver medal – second place	2015 Heerenveen	1000 m
Silver medal – second place	2016 Kolomna	1000 m
Silver medal – second place	2016 Kolomna	1500 m
Bronze medal – third place	2011 Inzell	1000 m
Bronze medal – third place	2015 Heerenveen	1500 m
Bronze medal – third place	2017 Gangneung	Mass start

Heather Bergsma (née Richardson; born March 20, 1989) is an American former speed skater who competed between 2006 and 2020.

== Career ==
Bergsma is a native of North Carolina. She represented the United States at the 2010 Winter Olympics in Vancouver, where she finished 6th in 500 metres, 9th in the 1000 metres, and 16th in the 1500 metres. At the 2011 World Single Distance Championships in Inzell, Germany, she won a bronze medal in the 1000 metres. She also placed 8th in the 500 metres, and was part of the team pursuit team that finished in 8th place.

On January 26–27, 2013, Bergsma won the gold medal at the 2013 World Sprint Championships in Salt Lake City, United States. She has since won several world championship medals, and earned numerous podium placings in the World Cup. At the 2018 Winter Olympics, she won the bronze medal in the team pursuit.

Bergsma held the American record on the 500 metres distance from 2011 to 2021. She is the current world record holder in the 2 x 500 meters, and held the 1500 metres world record from 2015 to 2019, and also briefly held the 1000 metres world record in November 2015, and the sprint combination world record from 2013 to 2017.

She announced her retirement from skating in February 2020.

== Personal life ==
Bergsma married Dutch speed skater and marathon skater Jorrit Bergsma in May 2015, and competed as Heather Richardson-Bergsma the following season.

== Speed skating ==
=== Records ===
==== Personal records ====
Personal records
Women's speed skating
Event	Result	Date	Location	Notes
500 m	36.90	November 16, 2013	Utah Olympic Oval, Salt Lake City	American record until beaten by Erin Jackson on December 3, 2021.
2 x 500 m	74.190	December 28, 2013	Utah Olympic Oval, Salt Lake City	Current world record.
1000 m	1:12.28	February 26, 2017	Olympic Oval, Calgary	
1500 m	1:50.85	November 21, 2015	Utah Olympic Oval, Salt Lake City	World record until beaten by Miho Takagi on March 10, 2019.
3000 m	4:05.00	March 7, 2015	Olympic Oval, Calgary	
5000 m	7:20.27	March 8, 2015	Olympic Oval, Calgary	

==== World records ====
World records
Women's speed skating
Event	Result	Date	Location	Notes
2 x 500 m	74.190	December 28, 2013	Utah Olympic Oval, Salt Lake City	Current world record.
1000 m	1:12.51	November 14, 2015	Olympic Oval, Calgary	World record until beaten by Brittany Bowe on November 22, 2015.
1500 m	1:50.85	November 21, 2015	Utah Olympic Oval, Salt Lake City	World record until beaten by Miho Takagi on March 10, 2019.
Sprint comb.	147.735	January 19–20, 2013	Olympic Oval, Calgary	World record until beaten by Nao Kodaira on February 25–26, 2017.

=== Results timeline ===
Season	World Sprint	World SD	World Cup	Olympic Games
2007–08	25th	Did not participate	53rd 500 m NC 1000 m	Not held
2008–09	20th	16th 2x500 m 15th 1000 m	NC 100 m 28th 500 m 22nd 1000 m NC 1500 m	Not held
2009–10	Did not participate	Not held	9th 500 m 9th 1000 m	6th 2x500 m 9th 1000 m 16th 1500 m
2010–11	4th	6th 2x500 m (bronze) 1000 m 8th team pursuit	4th 500 m (gold) 1000 m 14th 1500 m	Not held
2011–12	6th	4th 2x500 m 4th 1000 m 8th team pursuit	9th 500 m (silver) 1000 m 21st 1500 m	Not held
2012–13	1st place, gold medalist(s)	8th 2x500 m 6th 1000 m	5th 500 m (gold) 1000 m 33rd 1500 m	Not held
2013–14	3rd place, bronze medalist(s)	Not held	(silver) 500 m (gold) 1000 m 17th 1500 m 1st GWC	8th 2x500 m 7th 1000 m 7th 1500 m 6th team pursuit
2014–15	2nd place, silver medalist(s)	(gold) 2x500 m (silver) 1000 m (bronze) 1500 m	(bronze) 500 m 5th 1000 m (silver) 1500 m 30th 3k/5k 18th mass start 1st GWC	Not held
2015–16	2nd place, silver medalist(s)	5th 2x500 m (silver) 1000 m (silver) 1500 m 13th mass start	(bronze) 500 m (silver) 1000 m (silver) 1500 m 6th mass start	Not held

Note: NC = No classification.

Records
Preceded by (China) Yu Jing	Women's sprint combination speed skating world record January 20, 2013 – February 26, 2017	Succeeded by (Japan) Nao Kodaira
Preceded by (Germany) Jenny Wolf	Women's 2 x 500 m speed skating world record December 28, 2013 – present	Succeeded by Current holder
Preceded by (United States) Brittany Bowe	Women's 1000 m speed skating world record November 14, 2015 – November 22, 2015	Succeeded by (United States) Brittany Bowe
Preceded by (United States) Brittany Bowe	Women's 1500 m speed skating world record November 21, 2015 – March 10, 2019	Succeeded by (Japan) Miho Takagi
