= Svetlana Radkevich =

Belarusian speed skater

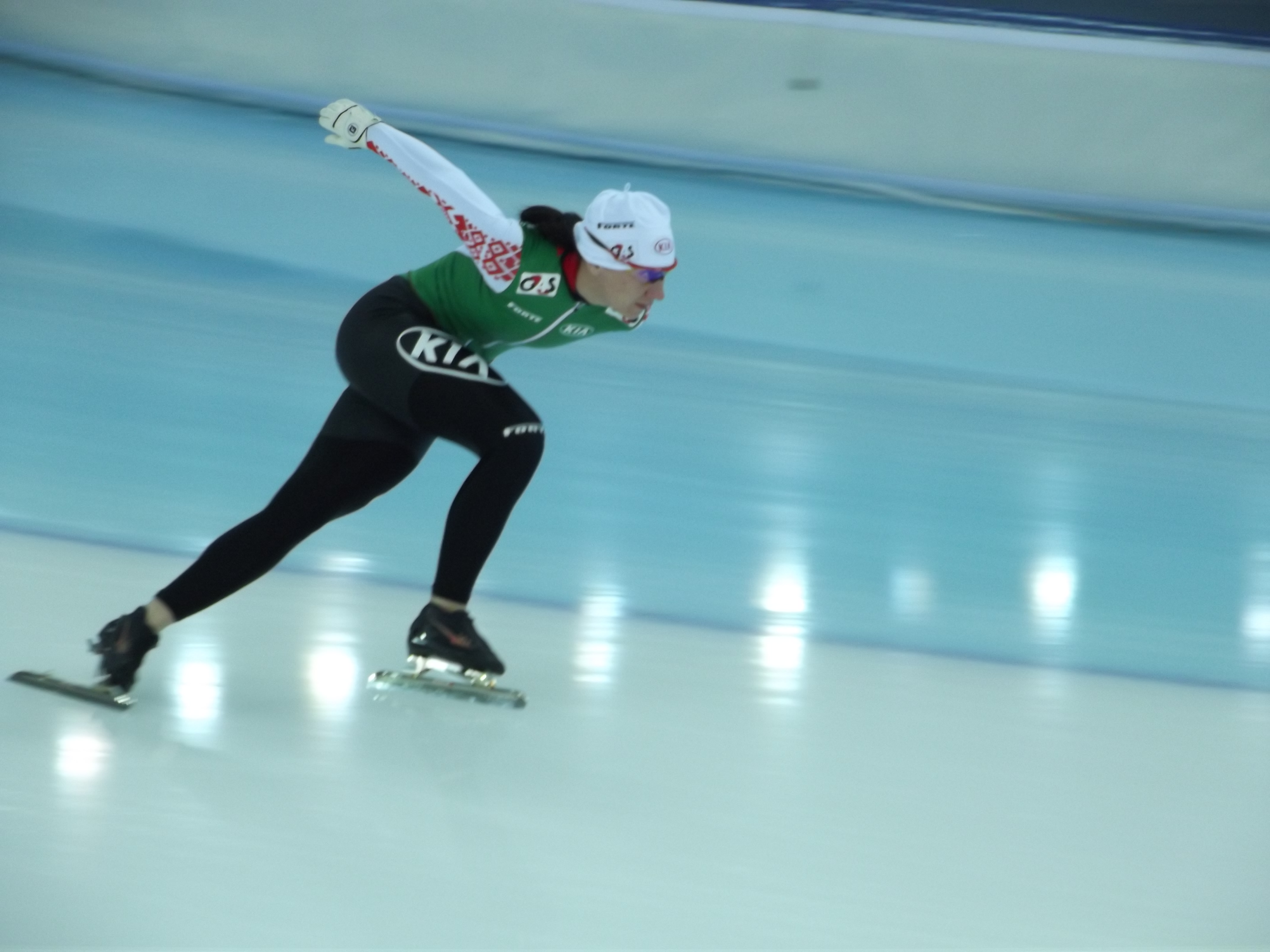
- Svetlana Radkevich in 2013

Personal information
- Nationality: Belarusian
- Born: 9 October 1979 (age 47) Minsk, Soviet Union

Sport
- Sport: Speed skating

Svetlana Radkevich (born 9 October 1979) is a Belarusian speed skater. She competed at the 2002, 2006 and the 2010 Winter Olympics.
