= Olga Fatkulina =

Russian speed skater (born 1990)

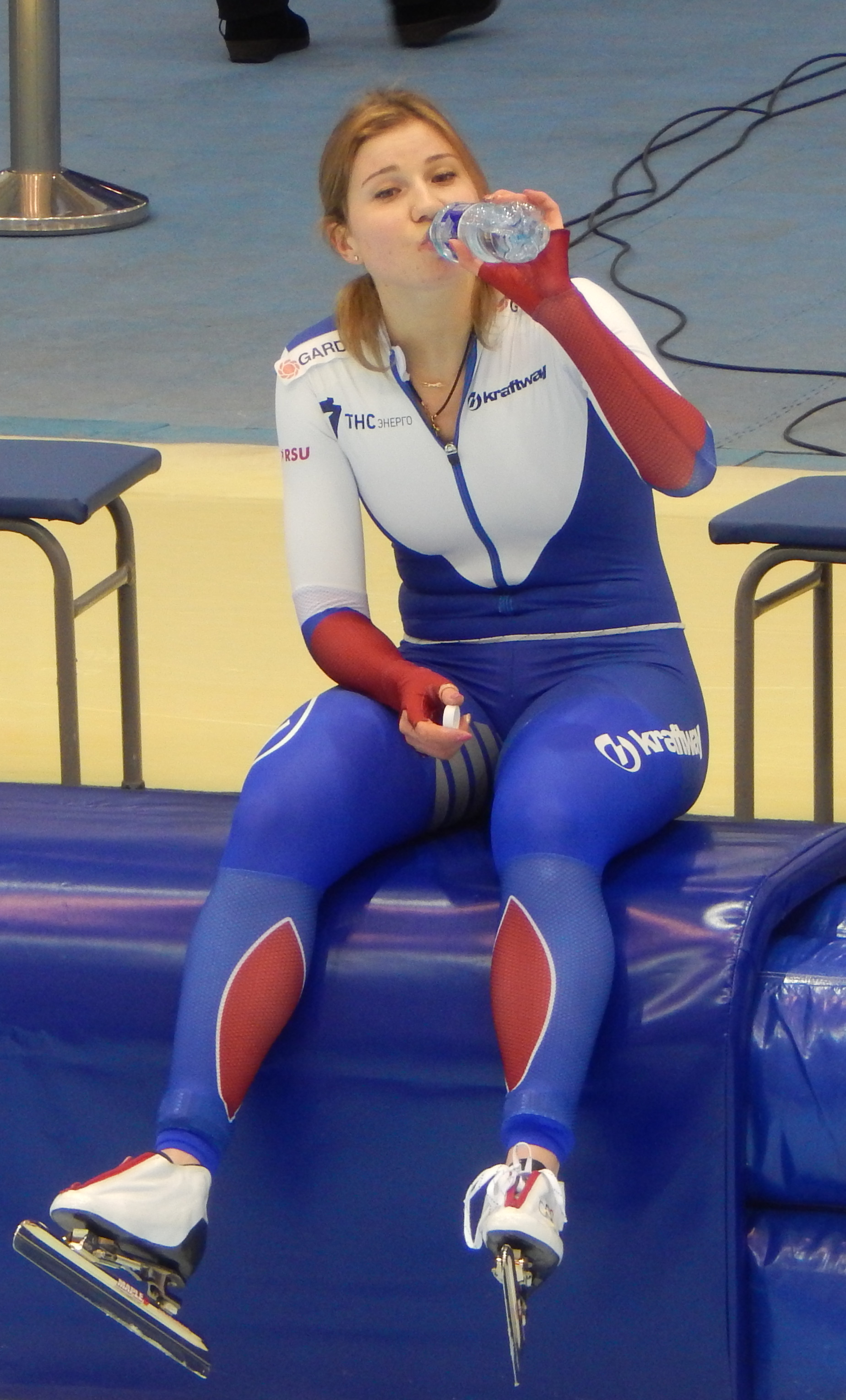
- 2016 World Championships – 1000 metres

Personal information
- Full name: Olga Aleksandrovna Fatkulina
- Nationality: Russian
- Born: 23 January 1990 (age 36) Chelyabinsk, Russian SFSR, Soviet Union
- Height: 1.72 m (5 ft 8 in)
- Weight: 62 kg (137 lb)

Sport
- Country: Russia
- Sport: Speed skating
- Event(s): 500 m, 1000 m, team sprint
- Club: Dynamo
Medal record
Representing Russia
Women's speed skating
Olympic Games
Silver medal – second place	2014 Sochi	500 m
World Single Distance Championships
Gold medal – first place	2013 Sochi	1000 m
Silver medal – second place	2020 Salt Lake City	1000 m
Silver medal – second place	2020 Salt Lake City	Team sprint
Bronze medal – third place	2013 Sochi	500 m
Bronze medal – third place	2019 Inzell	Team sprint
Bronze medal – third place	2020 Salt Lake City	500 m
World Sprint Championships
Bronze medal – third place	2018 Changchun	Sprint
Bronze medal – third place	2020 Hamar	Sprint
European Championships
Gold medal – first place	2018 Kolomna	Team sprint
Gold medal – first place	2020 Heerenveen	Team sprint
Gold medal – first place	2020 Heerenveen	500 m
Bronze medal – third place	2017 Heerenveen	Sprint
Bronze medal – third place	2019 Collalbo	Sprint
Representing Russian Skating Union
World Single Distances Championships
Bronze medal – third place	2021 Heerenveen	500 m

Olga Aleksandrovna Fatkulina (Russian: Ольга Александровна Фаткулина; born 23 January 1990) is a Russian long-track speed skater. She competed for Russia at the 2010 and 2014 Winter Olympics in the women's 500 m and 1000 m.

== Career ==
In the 2013 World Single Distance Championships she won the gold medal in the 1000 meters race, and a bronze medal in the 500 metres. At the 2014 Winter Olympics she won the silver medal in the 500 meters event. On 24 November 2017, she was disqualified from the 2014 Winter Olympics and had her silver medal stripped. On 1 February 2018, her results were restored and ban lifted as a result of the successful appeal.

== Records ==
=== Personal records ===
Personal records
Women's speed skating
Event	Result	Date	Location	Notes
500 m	36.72	10 December 2021	Olympic Oval, Calgary	
1000 m	1:12.33	15 February 2020	Utah Olympic Oval, Salt Lake City	Current Russian record.
1500 m	1:56.22	16 November 2013	Utah Olympic Oval, Salt Lake City	
3000 m	4:28.20	7 February 2009	Kolomna Speed Skating Center, Kolomna	
5000 m	8:03.66	5 April 2009	Uralska Molniya, Chelyabinsk	

== Results timeline ==
Season	World Sprint	World SD	World Cup	Olympic Games
2009–10	8th	Not held	25th 500 m 14th 1000 m	20th 2x500 m 20th 1000 m
2010–11	18th	14th 2x500 m	17th 500 m 33rd 1000 m	Not held
2011–12	12th	17th 2x500 m 14th 1000 m	19th 500 m 19th 1000 m	Not held
2012–13	9th	(bronze) 2x500 m (gold) 1000 m	4th 500 m 6th 1000 m	Not held
2013–14	Did not participate	Not held	(gold) 500 m (bronze) 1000 m 37th 1500 m 4th GWC	(silver) 2x500 m 4th 1000 m 9th 1500 m
2014–15	5th	13th 2x500 m 13th 1000 m	12th 500 m 12th 1000 m 33rd 1500 m 33rd GWC	Not held
2015–16	6th	7th 2x500 m 12th 1000 m		Not held
2016–17	9th	12th 500 m 13th 1000 m		Not held

== World Cup podiums ==
Date	Season	Location	Rank	Event
16 December 2012	2012–13	Harbin	3rd place, bronze medalist(s)	1000 m
2 March 2013	2012–13	Erfurt	2nd place, silver medalist(s)	500 m
3 March 2013	2012–13	Erfurt	3rd place, bronze medalist(s)	1000 m
16 November 2013	2013–14	Salt Lake City	3rd place, bronze medalist(s)	500 m
30 November 2013	2013–14	Astana	3rd place, bronze medalist(s)	500 m
1 December 2013	2013–14	Astana	3rd place, bronze medalist(s)	1000 m
6 December 2013	2013–14	Berlin	2nd place, silver medalist(s)	500 m
7 December 2013	2013–14	Berlin	2nd place, silver medalist(s)	500 m
8 December 2013	2013–14	Berlin	3rd place, bronze medalist(s)	1000 m
7 March 2014	2013–14	Inzell	3rd place, bronze medalist(s)	500 m
8 March 2014	2013–14	Inzell	2nd place, silver medalist(s)	500 m
9 March 2014	2013–14	Inzell	3rd place, bronze medalist(s)	1000 m
15 March 2014	2013–14	Heerenveen	1st place, gold medalist(s)	500 m
16 March 2014	2013–14	Heerenveen	1st place, gold medalist(s)	500 m
14 November 2014	2014–15	Obihiro	3rd place, bronze medalist(s)	500 m
19 November 2016	2016–17	Nagano	2nd place, silver medalist(s)	Team sprint
10 December 2016	2016–17	Heerenveen	2nd place, silver medalist(s)	Team sprint
27 January 2017	2016–17	Berlin	3rd place, bronze medalist(s)	500 m
12 November 2017	2017–18	Heerenveen	1st place, gold medalist(s)	Team sprint
1 December 2017	2017–18	Calgary	1st place, gold medalist(s)	Team sprint
20 January 2018	2017–18	Erfurt	3rd place, bronze medalist(s)	500 m
18 March 2018	2017–18	Minsk	3rd place, bronze medalist(s)	500 m
18 March 2018	2017–18	Minsk	1st place, gold medalist(s)	Team sprint
17 November 2018	2018–19	Obihiro	3rd place, bronze medalist(s)	500 m
18 November 2018	2018–19	Obihiro	1st place, gold medalist(s)	Team sprint
7 December 2018	2018–19	Tomaszów Mazowiecki	2nd place, silver medalist(s)	500 m
8 December 2018	2018–19	Tomaszów Mazowiecki	2nd place, silver medalist(s)	500 m
3 February 2019	2018–19	Hamar	3rd place, bronze medalist(s)	500 m
15 November 2019	2019–20	Minsk	2nd place, silver medalist(s)	Team sprint
16 November 2019	2019–20	Minsk	1st place, gold medalist(s)	500 m
22 November 2019	2019–20	Tomaszów Mazowiecki	1st place, gold medalist(s)	Team sprint
23 November 2019	2019–20	Tomaszów Mazowiecki	2nd place, silver medalist(s)	500 m
6 December 2019	2019–20	Nur-Sultan	3rd place, bronze medalist(s)	1000 m
6 December 2019	2019–20	Nur-Sultan	2nd place, silver medalist(s)	Team sprint
13 December 2019	2019–20	Nagano	2nd place, silver medalist(s)	Team sprint
7 February 2020	2019–20	Calgary	2nd place, silver medalist(s)	1000 m
24 January 2021	2020–21	Heerenveen	3rd place, bronze medalist(s)	500 m
12 November 2021	2021–22	Tomaszów Mazowiecki	3rd place, bronze medalist(s)	500 m

=== Overall rankings ===
Season	Event	Rank
2013–14	500 m	1st place, gold medalist(s)
2013–14	1000 m	3rd place, bronze medalist(s)
2018–19	500 m	3rd place, bronze medalist(s)
2019–20	500 m	3rd place, bronze medalist(s)
2019–20	1000 m	3rd place, bronze medalist(s)
2020–21	500 m	3rd place, bronze medalist(s)
