= Lee Sang-hwa =

South Korean speed skater (born 1989)

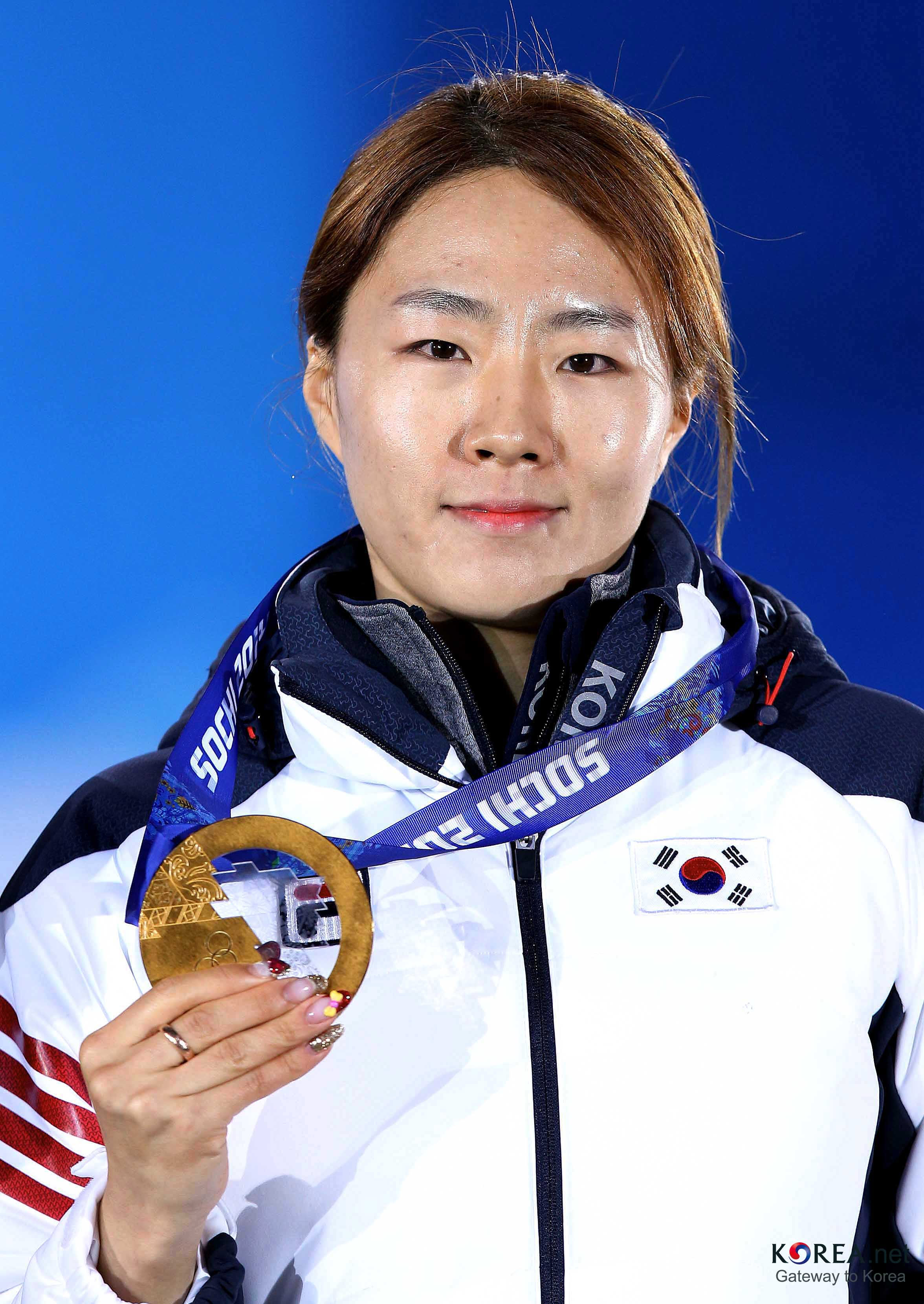

Personal information
- Born: 25 February 1989 (age 37) Seoul, South Korea
- Height: 1.65 m (5 ft 5 in)
- Weight: 62 kg (137 lb)
- Spouse: Kangnam (m. 2019)

Sport
- Country: South Korea
- Sport: Speed skating
- Team: Seoul Metropolitan Government
- Retired: 2019
Medal record
Olympic Games
Gold medal – first place	2010 Vancouver	500 m
Gold medal – first place	2014 Sochi	500 m
Silver medal – second place	2018 Pyeongchang	500 m
World Sprint Championships
Gold medal – first place	2010 Obihiro	Women
Bronze medal – third place	2013 Salt Lake City	Women
World Single Distance Championships
Gold medal – first place	2012 Heerenveen	500 m
Gold medal – first place	2013 Sochi	500 m
Gold medal – first place	2016 Kolomna	500 m
Silver medal – second place	2011 Inzell	500 m
Silver medal – second place	2017 Gangneung	500 m
Bronze medal – third place	2005 Inzell	500 m
Bronze medal – third place	2009 Vancouver	500 m
World Junior Championships
Bronze medal – third place	2005 Seinäjoki	All Around
Winter Universiade
Gold medal – first place	2007 Torino	500 m
Gold medal – first place	2009 Harbin	500 m
Bronze medal – third place	2009 Harbin	100 m
Asian Winter Games
Silver medal – second place	2007 Changchun	500 m
Bronze medal – third place	2011 Astana-Almaty	500 m
Silver medal – second place	2017 Sapporo	500 m
Bronze medal – third place	2007 Changchun	100 m

- Lee Sang-hwa
- Hangul: 이상화
- Hanja: 李相花
- RR: I Sanghwa
- MR: I Sanghwa

Lee Sang-hwa (Korean: 이상화; Hanja: 李相花, Korean pronunciation: [i.saŋ.βwa]; born 25 February 1989) is a South Korean retired speed skater who specialises in the sprint distances. She is a two-time Olympic champion in 500 metres (2010 and 2014) and the 2010 World Sprint champion. She was the world record holder in women's 500 metres with the time of 36.36 seconds set in Salt Lake City on 16 November 2013, and held the South Korean record on 1000 metres from March 2009 until January 2024.

She has also won three World Championships medals in 500 metres, and has placed in the top three in World Cup events four times in this distance. Her first World Cup victory, however, came on the non-Olympic distance 100 metres. On the 1000 metres, however, she has never placed higher than fifth in international events (2010 World Sprint Championships, first 1000 metres).

== Early life and education ==
Lee Sang-hwa was born in 1989 to Lee U-geun (father), a technician at Hwigyeong Girls' School, and Kim In-sun (mother). Lee has an older brother, Lee Sang-jun, who was also a skater. Following her older brother’s lead, she started skating when she was in first grade at Eunseok Elementary School. Although her brother excelled at skating, and won a skating competition at his elementary school, Lee appeared to be the better skater. Since their parents could not afford to support the extra-curricular activity for both children, only Sang-hwa continued.

Lee and Mo Tae-bum, gold medalist at Vancouver 2010, are close friends since elementary school. She attended Korea National Sport University with him.

== Career ==
Lee first competed internationally aged 14 in Canada, where she skated several test races in October 2003, winning comfortably and skating with a best time of 39.02 seconds. At the time, the U19 world record was 38.53. Her first ISU championship was in Roseville, Minnesota, during the 2004 World Junior Championships. As the youngest participant, she finished 16th, though she took third place on the 500 metres, 0.45 seconds behind world junior record holder Shannon Rempel.

The following season, she raced 38.77 in test races in Calgary, and was selected for the World Cup races in Nagano, Harbin and Calgary. She placed eighth in her first race, recording 38.71 in the M-Wave, Nagano, 0.29 seconds behind winner Wang Manli. She finished in the top ten a further five times that season, including two fourth-place finishes in 100 metre sprints, which gave her fifth place overall in the 100 metre World Cup. In other achievements, she won two senior Korean titles (on 2 × 500 metres and sprint), and came 14th in the 500 metres World Cup standings, 16th in the 1000 metres, and 15th in the samalog standings in the World Sprint Championships, though she was within half a second of the winner on both 500 metre races, finishing 9th and 12th.

In the World Championships, Lee won three medals that season; two in the junior championships, where she won bronze in the overall standings, though she was four points after the winner after 16th place on the 1500 and 19th on the 3000 metre event, and silver with the Korean team in the team pursuit event. And during the World Single Distance Championships in Inzell in March, two fourth-places were enough to take her to third place overall in the 500 metre competition, behind Chinese skaters Wang Manli and Wang Beixing.

In 2006, Lee improved on the 100 and 500 metres, though she fell into the B division on the 1000 metres. She finished on the World Cup podium four times during the season, including a win in the 100 metre World Cup final, though she finished behind Jenny Wolf in the overall standings. On the 500 metres, she was sixth in the World Cup. She also added three senior Korean titles to her record, winning the 500 metres, 1000 metres, and overall sprint championship. During the season, she registered a world junior record on the 500 metres, with a time of 37.90 in Utah Olympic Oval. She failed to improve on her 1000-metre time from last season, however.

The Turin Olympics ended with fifth place for Lee, despite her third-best second run which wasn't enough to lift her up more than one place. Earlier, she had finished 19th on the 1000 metres and 12th in the World Sprint Championships.

The 2007 season has seen further improvement for Lee. She is yet to finish outside the top two, and after three of 12 races she heads the overall standings on the 500 metres. She has also improved on the 1000 metres, and became 11th in the overall standings, with eighth place in Heerenveen.

At the 2010 Winter Olympics, Lee won her first Olympic gold medal in the women's 500 m becoming the first Asian woman ever to do so. She raced against Germany's Jenny Wolf, the world-record holder at the time, in both of her races. Although Wolf had the best time in the second of the two races, Lee edged her out by five hundredths of a second with a combined race time of 76.09 seconds to Wolf's 76.14 seconds.

On 9 November 2013, she broke the world record on 500 metres in the 2013–14 World Cup event in Calgary, Alberta, Canada, with a time of 36.74 seconds. On 15 November, in the 2013–14 World Cup event in Salt Lake City, United States, she improved the record a further 17/100, to 36.57 seconds. The next day, she improved it another 21/100, to 36.36 seconds.

On 11 February 2014, she won her second Olympic gold medal in the women's 500 m at the 2014 Sochi Winter Olympics with an Olympic record of 74.70 seconds and successfully defended her crown from the 2010 Olympics in Vancouver. Lee's second run set the Olympic record of 37.28 seconds, giving her an aggregate time of 74.70 seconds. Russia's Olga Fatkulina finished second with an aggregate time of 75.06 seconds, and Margot Boer of the Netherlands came in third with an aggregate time of 75.48 seconds. She became the first woman since Catriona Le May Doan at the 2002 Olympics to defend the gold at the event and just the third woman ever to win back-to-back Olympic gold in the 500 metres, and the first Asian woman ever to do so.

Lee competed in her fourth Winter Olympics at the 2018 Pyeongchang Winter Olympics, and won the silver, her third Olympic medal, in front of her home crowd. She was defeated by Japan's Nao Kodaira who was the other favourite coming into the event. Overcome with emotions upon finishing her lap, Lee burst into tears during the celebratory lap, and was consoled and embraced by her rival and friend, Kodaira. The scene of Lee and Kodaira embracing and congratulating each other, touched on many viewers and commentators worldwide, making it one of the most memorable moments of the 2018 Olympics.

At a press conference on 16 May 2019, Lee officially announced she would retire from speed skating.

In February 2022, Lee made her sports commentary debut at the 2022 Winter Olympics.

Lee said "I've experienced four Olympics and I'm convinced it is a place that's helped me grow. I hope it will continue to be a platform that will help make the world a brighter place, bring together people from all corners."

== Personal life ==
On 16 March 2019, Lee's agency confirmed that she and singer Kangnam were dating. They got to know each other while appearing on the SBS variety show Law of the Jungle ("in Last Indian Ocean" part). On 29 August, Kangnam's and Lee Sang Hwa's labels collectively released an official statement, confirming the couple had married. The wedding ceremony was held on 12 October at a hotel in Seoul.

The couple currently resides in a 5-story building constructed by her husband on a piece of land that has been in his family for generations in Yongsan-gu, Seoul.

On Kangnam's personal YouTube channel, his wife's face was kept hidden until the channel reached 800,000 subscribers. Finally, on July 31, 2024, they reached this milestone, and Sanghwa’s face was revealed.

== Records ==
=== Personal records ===
Personal records
Speed skating
Event	Result	Date	Location	Notes
500 m	36.36	16 November 2013	Utah Olympic Oval, Salt Lake City	National record
1000 m	1:13.66	21 September 2013	Olympic Oval, Calgary	South Korean record until beaten by Kim Min-sun on 28 January 2024.
1500 m	2:00.66	7 September 2013	Olympic Oval, Calgary	
3000 m	4:23.60	27 October 2002	Olympic Oval, Calgary	

=== World records ===
World records
Speed skating
Event	Result	Date	Location	Notes
500 m	36.80	20 January 2013	Olympic Oval, Calgary	World record until beaten by herself on 9 November 2013.
500 m	36.74	9 November 2013	Olympic Oval, Calgary	World record until beaten by herself on 15 November 2013.
500 m	36.57	15 November 2013	Utah Olympic Oval, Salt Lake City	World record until beaten by herself on 16 November 2013.
500 m	36.36	16 November 2013	Utah Olympic Oval, Salt Lake City	World record until beaten by Femke Kok on 16 November 2025

== Filmography ==
=== Television shows ===
Year	Title	Network	Role	Notes	Ref.
2022–present	Sporty Sisters	Tcast E-Channel	Cast member	Season 2	

Records
Preceded by (Canada) Shannon Rempel	Girls' sprint combination speed skating world record 23 January 2005 – 29 January 2012	Succeeded by (Czech Republic) Karolína Erbanová
Preceded by (Japan) Sayuri Yoshii	Girls' 500 m speed skating world record 18 November 2005 – 22 September 2017	Succeeded by (South Korea) Kim Min-sun
Preceded by (China) Yu Jing	Women's 500 m speed skating world record 20 January 2013 – present	Succeeded by Current holder
