= Judith Dannhauer =

German speed skater

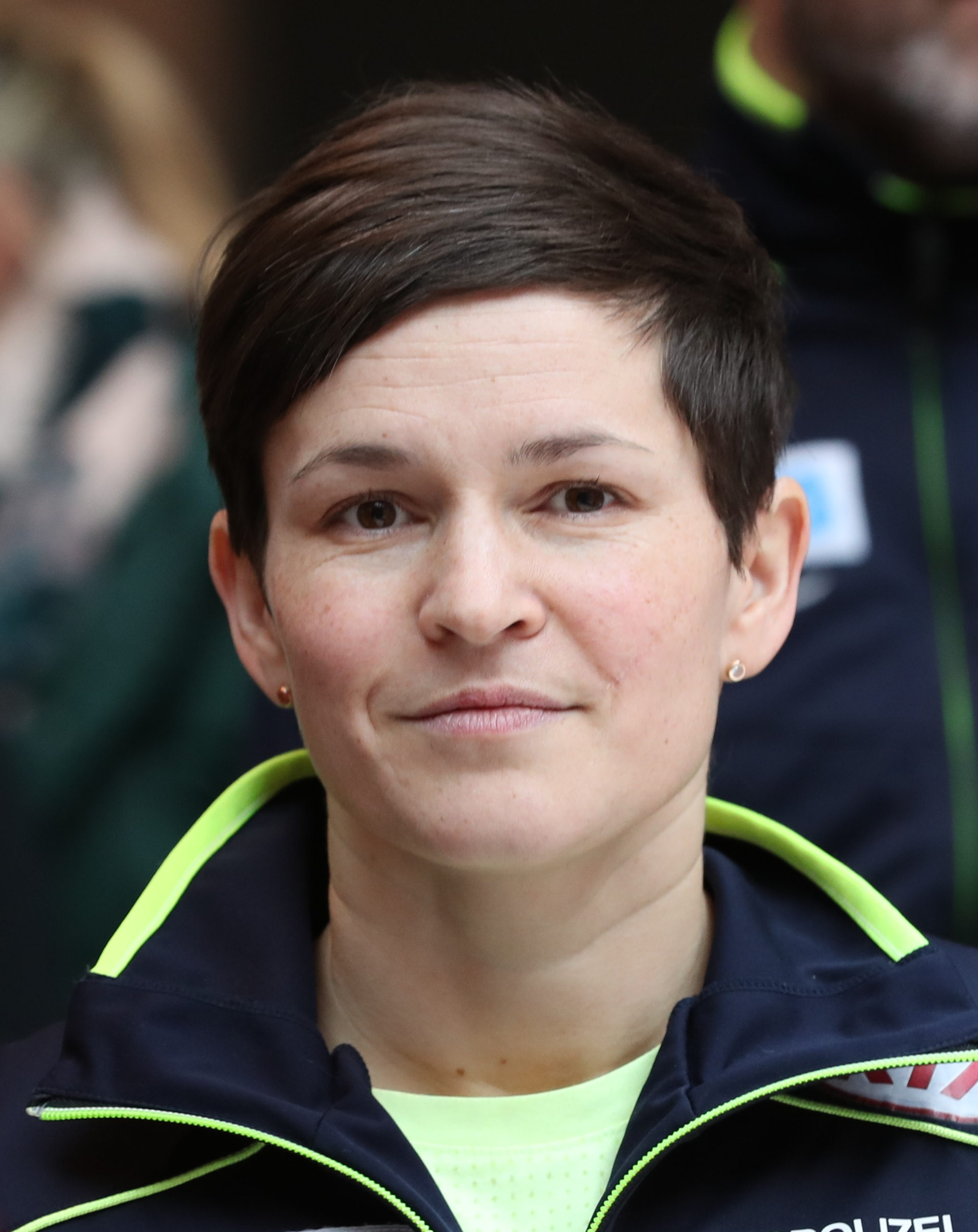
- Dannhauer in 2018

Personal information
- Born: 3 September 1982 (age 43) Erfurt, East Germany
- Height: 1.58 m (5 ft 2 in)
- Weight: 53 kg (117 lb)

Sport
- Country: Germany
- Sport: Speed skating
- Event: 500 m

Judith Dannhauer (née Hesse; born 3 September 1982) is a German speed skater. She competed for Germany at the 2006, 2010, 2014 and 2018 Winter Olympics.

At the 2014 Winter Olympic games Ladies 500m Speed Skating event, Judith received two false starts and was disqualified. But that did not end her career.

She competed in the Ladies 500m race during day 3 of the ISU World Single Distances Speed Skating Championships held at Thialf Ice Arena on 14 February 2015 in Heerenveen, Netherlands.

She competed in the Ladies 1000m race during day 2 of the ISU World Sprint Speed Skating Championships at the Alau Ice Palace on 1 March 2015 in Astana, Kazakhstan.
