= Karolína Erbanová =

Czech ice hockey player and speed skater

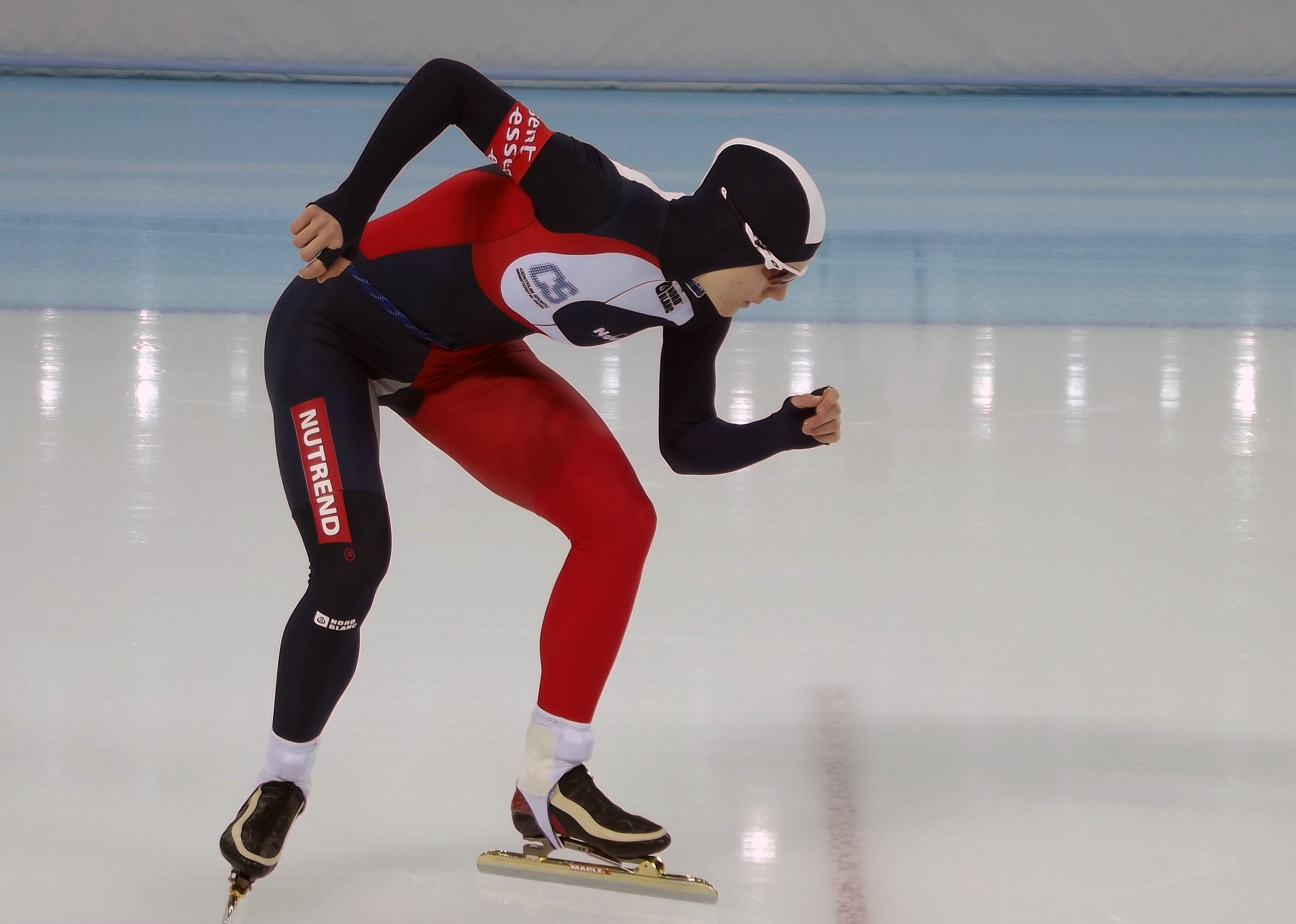
- Erbanová at the 2013 World Single Distance Speed Skating Championships

Personal information
- Born: 27 October 1992 (age 33) Vrchlabí, Czechoslovakia
- Height: 1.76 m (5 ft 9 in)
- Weight: 66 kg (146 lb)
Ice hockey career
- Position: Forward
- Shoots: Left
- Played for: HPK Hämeenlinna; Almtuna IS
- National team: Czech Republic
- Playing career: 2018–present

Sport
- Country: Czech Republic
- Sport: Long-track speed skating
- Club: NOVIS Team
- Retired: 29 August 2018
Medal record
Representing Czech Republic
Women's speed skating
Olympic Games
Bronze medal – third place	2018 Pyeongchang	500 m
World Cup
Bronze medal – third place	2008–09	Team pursuit
World Sprint Championship
Bronze medal – third place	2015 Astana	Sprint
World Single Distance Championships
Bronze medal – third place	2015 Heerenveen	1000 m
European Championships
Gold medal – first place	2017 Heerenveen	Sprint
Gold medal – first place	2018 Kometa	500 m
Women's ice hockey
World Championship
Bronze medal – third place	2022 Denmark

Karolína Erbanová (Czech pronunciation: [ˈkaroliːna ˈɛrbanovaː]; born 27 October 1992) is a Czech ice hockey player and retired long-track speed skater. She won a bronze medal at the 2018 Winter Olympics in the 500 m event in speed skating.

Erbanová was a member of the Czech national ice hockey team that won bronze at the 2022 IIHF Women's World Championship. Her ice hockey club career has included seasons in the Swedish Damettan with Almtuna IS and in the Finnish Naisten Liiga (NSML) with HPK Hämeenlinna.

== Speed skating career ==
As a child, Erbanová enjoyed cross-country skiing and played ice hockey from age 10. She was very fast on skates and, at 13, she was recommended as a prospect to NOVIS Team head coach Petr Novák by her ice hockey coach. The following year, she joined the NOVIS Team. It was initially predicted that she would be a middle-distance skater but she came to specialize in sprints instead.

Despite demonstrating an aptitude for shorter distance tracks, early in her career as a member of the NOVIS team Erbanová was obligated to skate the same events as her team leader, long-track skater Martina Sáblíková. During 2008 to 2012, she competed semi-frequently in 3000 m and occasionally in 5000 m, Sáblíková's best events.

Together with teammates Martina Sáblíková and Andrea Jirků, she won the overall team pursuit of the 2008–09 ISU Speed Skating World Cup. At the 2009 tournament of the World Junior Speed Skating Championships in Zakopane, she competed in the 3000 m allround but was disqualified after forgetting to change lanes. In the following World Junior Championships in Moscow, she fell during the second 500 m race and lost the chance to medal.

During the 2012–13 season she won her first individual Senior World Cup in Harbin at the 1000 m.

On 27 August 2018, she announced her retirement from professional speed skating at the age of 25, citing the "manipulative, degrading and aggressive behavior" of Czech national speed-skating coach Petr Novák as the primary motivator.

=== Medal table ===
Major tournaments in bold.

	Gold	Silver	Bronze
**Olympic Games**	0	0	1
**World Single Distance Championships**	0	0	1
**World Allround Championships**	0	0	0
World Allround Championships	0	1	1
**European Allround Championships**	0	0	0
European Allround Championships	3	0	0
**World Junior Championships**	6	2	3
**World Cup**	1+1	1	0
**World Cup Overall**	0+1	0	0

=== Personal records ===
As of 14 February 2018

Distance	Time	Date set	Place
500 meters	37.06	25 February 2017	Calgary, Canada
1000 meters	1:13.53	25 February 2017	Calgary, Canada
1500 meters	1:55.35	16 November 2013	Salt Lake City, United States
3000 meters	4:17.73	12 February 2011	Calgary, Canada
5000 meters	7:36.65	10 January 2010	Hamar, Norway

== Speedskating results ==
=== Olympic Games ===
Erbanová represented the Czech Republic in speed skating at the Winter Olympics in 2010, 2014, and 2018. She competed in the 500 m and 1000 m speed skating events at all three Olympics and also in 1500 m speed skating events in 2010 and 2014. Her best finish was an Olympic bronze in the 500 m event at the 2018 Winter Olympics.

Year	Place	500 m	1000 m	1500 m	3000 m	5000 m	Teams	Age
2010	Vancouver	23	12	25	–	–	–	17.2
2014	Sochi	10	10	13	–	–	–	21.2
2018	Pyeongchang	3rd place, bronze medalist(s)	7	–	–	–	–	25.2

=== World Single Distance Championships ===
Erbanová participated in seven World Single Distances Speed Skating Championships for Women. Her best finish was bronze in the 1000 m at the 2015 World Single Distance Speed Skating Championships.

Year	Place	500 m	1000 m	1500 m	3000 m	5000 m	Teams	Age
2009	Richmond	–	–	21	–	–	7	16.3
2011	Inzell	11	17	–	–	–	–	18.3
2012	Heerenveen	8	15	14	–	–	–	19.3
2013	Sochi	10	5	6	–	–	–	20.3
2015	Heerenveen	7	3rd place, bronze medalist(s)	–	–	–	–	22.3
2016	Kolomna	14	13	–	–	–	–	23.3
2017	Gangneung	4	5	–	–	–	–	24.3

=== World Allround Championships ===
Erbanová participated in two World Allround Speed Skating Championships. She did not qualify for the 5000 m at either championship and was therefore unable to contest for an allround medal. Her highest finish in a single event was second in the 500 m at the 2011 World Allround Speed Skating Championships.

Year	Place	500 m	1500 m	3000 m	5000 m	Allround	Age
2010	Heerenveen	3rd place, bronze medalist(s)	12	24	–	–	17.2
2011	Calgary	2nd place, silver medalist(s)	10	24	–	–	18.2

=== World Sprint Championships ===
Erbanová participated in five World Sprint Speed Skating Championships for Women. Her best allround finish was bronze at the 2015 World Sprint Speed Skating Championships – Women.

Year	Place	500 m		1000 m		Allround	Age
2012	Calgary	15	15	22	11	17	19.2
2013	Salt Lake City	17	9	4	DQ	–	20.2
2015	Astana	3	3	7	5	3rd place, bronze medalist(s)	22.2
2016	Seoul	11	6	5	6	7	23.2
2017	Calgary	2	2	4	4	4	24.2

=== European Championships ===
The European Speed Skating Championships for Women were contested as an allround comprising 500 m, 1500 m, 3000 m, 5000 m events until 2017. The 2017 European Speed Skating Championships was the first instance in which the traditional allround and sprint allround were contested at a single tournament, with medalists in both allround and sprint. The 2018 European Speed Skating Championships were the first instance in which the European Championship comprised single distances, neither sprint nor allround were contested.

==== Allround ====
Erbanová's best allround finish was ninth in 2010. She placed first in the 500 m event in 2010, 2011, 2012, and 2013.

Year	Place	500 m	1500 m	3000 m	5000 m	Allround	Age
2009	Heerenveen	14	12	19	–	–	16.1
2010	Hamar	1st place, gold medalist(s)	5	17	12	9	17.1
2011	Collalbo	1st place, gold medalist(s)	7	19	12	10	18.1
2012	Budapest	1st place, gold medalist(s)	16	20	–	–	19.1
2013	Heerenveen	1st place, gold medalist(s)	11	22	–	12	20.1
2014	Hamar	2nd place, silver medalist(s)	16	21	–	16	21.1

==== Sprint ====
Year	Place	500 m		1000 m		Allround	Age
2017	Heerenveen	2	2	2	2	1st place, gold medalist(s)	24.1

==== Single distances ====
Year	Place	500 m	1500 m	3000 m	Mass start	Team sprint	Team pursuit	Age
2018	Kolomna	1st place, gold medalist(s)	–	–	–	–	–	25.1

=== World Junior Championships ===
Erbanová participated in four World Junior Speed Skating Championships. Her best allround finish was gold in 2011, at age 18, and she also won medals in 2010 and 2012, bronze and silver respectively.

Year	Place	500 m		1000 m	1500 m	3000 m	Allround	Teams	Age
2009	Zakopane	4	–	4	4	dq	16	–	16.3
2010	Moscow	2	dnf	3rd place, bronze medalist(s)	3rd place, bronze medalist(s)	17	3rd place, bronze medalist(s)	–	17.3
2011	Seinäjoki	2	1st place, gold medalist(s)	1st place, gold medalist(s)	1st place, gold medalist(s)	6	1st place, gold medalist(s)	–	18.3
2012	Obihiro	3	1st place, gold medalist(s)	2nd place, silver medalist(s)	1st place, gold medalist(s)	9	2nd place, silver medalist(s)	–	19.3

=== National Championships ===
Year	Place	500 m	1000 m	1500 m	3000 m	5000 m	Allround	Age
2008	rybník Černý	3rd place, bronze medalist(s)	x	x	4	x	4	16.1

=== World Cup ===
Legend:

- did not start = "–"
- distance was not held = "x"
- did not finish = "dnf"
- MS = "mass start"

Season	Place	100 m	500m		1000 m		1500 m	3000 m	5000 m	Teams	Age
2008/09	Berlin	x	–	–	–		23/B	19/B	x	6	16.0
2008/09	Heerenveen	x	–	–	–		–	22/B	x	7	16.0
2008/09	Moscow	x	x		x		–	x	–	x	–
2008/09	Changchun	–	–	–	–	–	x	x	x	x	–
2008/09	Nagano	–	–	–	–	–	x	x	x	x	–
2008/09	Kolomna	–	–	–	–	–	x	x	x	x	–
2008/09	Erfurt	x	–	–	12/B		dnf	13/B	x	1st place, gold medalist(s)	16.2
2008/09	Heerenveen	x	x		x		2/B	x	–	x	16.2
2008/09	Salt Lake City	–	–	–	–		–	–	x	x	–
2008/09		–	–		np (0p)		36 (19p)	np (0p)		(gold) (235p)	

Season	Place	500m		1000 m		1500 m	3000 m	5000 m	Teams	Age
2009/10	Berlin	–	–	7/B		8/B	18/B	x	x	17.0
2009/10	Heerenveen	–	–	14/B		6/B	–	x	10	17.0
2009/10	Hamar	x		x		11/A	x	–	x	17.0
2009/10	Calgary	–	–	9/B		1/B	24/B	x	–	17.0
2009/10	Salt Lake City	22/B	15/B	7/B		20/A	–	x	–	17.0
2009/10	Erfurt	–	–	–	–	x	x	x	x	–
2009/10	Heerenveen	–	–	–		–	–	x	–	–
2009/10		np (0p)		45 (9p)		22 (62p)	np (0p)		11 (28p)	

Season	Place	500m		1000 m		1500 m	3000 m	5000 m	Teams	Age
2010/11	Heerenveen	4/B	3/B	4/B		24/A (dq)	17/B	x	x	18.0
2010/11	Berlin	14/A	21/A	5/B		14/B	–	x	–	18.0
2010/11	Hamar	x		x		2/B	x	–	–	18.0
2010/11	Changchun	–	–	–	–	x	x	x	x	–
2010/11	Obihiro	–	–	–	–	x	x	x	x	–
2010/11	Moscow	15/A	14/A	20/A		20/A	11/B	x	–	18.2
2010/11	Salt Lake City	x		x		–	x	–	x	–
2010/11	Heerenveen	–	–	–		–	–	x	x	–
2010/11		26 (76p)		36 (24p)		33 (24p)	np (0p)		–	

Season	Place	500m		1000 m		1500 m	3000 m	5000 m	MS	Teams	Age
2011/12	Chelyabinsk	4/B	1/B	2/B		7/B	–	x	x	–	19.0
2011/12	Astana	9/A	10/A	6/A		–	–	x	–	x	19.0
2011/12	Heerenveen	14/A	6/A	4/A		–	x	–	x	–	19.0
2011/12	Salt Lake City	–	–	–	–	x	x	x	x	x	–
2011/12	Hamar	x		x		4/B	21/B	x	x	–	19.2
2011/12	Heerenveen	–	–	–		–	x	–	x	–	–
2011/12	Berlin	13/A	20/A	–		–	–	x	–	–	19.3
2011/12		17 (180p)		18 (124p)		37 (15p)	np (0b)		–	–	

Season	Place	500m		1000 m		1500 m	3000 m	5000 m	MS	Teams	Age
2012/13	Heerenveen	10/A	10/A	7/A		–	–	x	–	–	20.0
2012/13	Kolomna	x		x		2/B	–	x	–	x	20.0
2012/13	Astana	x		x		7/A	x	–	x	–	20.0
2012/13	Nagano	9/A	7/A	7/A	6/A	x	x	x	x	x	20.1
2012/13	Harbin	10/A	12/A	1/A	2/A	x	x	x	x	–	20.1
2012/13	Calgary	–	–	–	–	x	x	x	x	x	–
2012/13	Inzell	x		x		–	–	x	–	x	–
2012/13	Erfurt	–	–	–		–	x	–	–	–	–
2012/13	Heerenveen	–	–	–		–	–	x	–	–	–
2012/13		–		–		–	–		–	–	

Records
Preceded by (South Korea) Lee Sang-hwa	Girls' sprint combination speed skating world record 29 January 2012 – present	Succeeded by Current holder
Awards
Preceded by Tomáš Paprstka	Czech Junior Athlete of the Year; 2011, 2012	Succeeded by Ester Ledecká
