= 2014–15 ISU Speed Skating World Cup – Women's mass start =

The women's mass start in the 2014–15 ISU Speed Skating World Cup was contested over six races on six occasions, out of a total of seven World Cup occasions for the season, with the first occasion taking place in Obihiro, Japan, on 14–16 November 2014, and the final occasion taking place in Erfurt, Germany, on 21–22 March 2015. The races were over 16 laps.

The defending champion was Francesca Lollobrigida of Italy. Ivanie Blondin of Canada won the cup. Lollobrigida ended up in sixth place.

== Top three ==
| Position | Athlete | Points | Previous season |
|---|---|---|---|
| 1 | (Canada) Ivanie Blondin | 466 | 4th |
| 2 | (Netherlands) Irene Schouten | 432 | 2nd |
| 3 | (Czech Republic) Martina Sáblíková | 405 | – |

== Race medallists ==
| WC # | Location | Date | Gold | Race points | Silver | Race points | Bronze | Race points | Report |
|---|---|---|---|---|---|---|---|---|---|
| 1 | Obihiro, Japan | 16 November | Ivanie Blondin; Canada | 61 | Nana Takagi; Japan | 40 | Irene Schouten; Netherlands | 20 | |
| 2 | Seoul, South Korea | 23 November | Martina Sáblíková; Czech Republic | 66 | Irene Schouten; Netherlands | 40 | Ivanie Blondin; Canada | 20 | |
| 3 | Berlin, Germany | 7 December | Irene Schouten; Netherlands | 61 | Ivanie Blondin; Canada | 43 | Jun Ye-jin; South Korea | 20 | |
| 4 | Heerenveen, Netherlands | 14 December | Ivanie Blondin; Canada | 60 | Kim Bo-reum; South Korea | 40 | Irene Schouten; Netherlands | 20 | |
| 5 | Hamar, Norway | 1 February | Irene Schouten; Netherlands | 61 | Ivanie Blondin; Canada | 40 | Mariska Huisman; Netherlands | 23 | |
| 7 | Erfurt, Germany | 22 March | Martina Sáblíková; Czech Republic | 68 | Nana Takagi; Japan | 40 | Francesca Lollobrigida; Italy | 25 | |

== Standings ==
Standings as of 22 March 2015 (end of the season).

| # | Name | Nat. | OBI | SEO | BER | HVN | HAM | ERF | Total |
|---|---|---|---|---|---|---|---|---|---|
| 1 | Ivanie Blondin | (Canada) | 100 | 70 | 80 | 100 | 80 | 36 | 466 |
| 2 | Irene Schouten | (Netherlands) | 70 | 80 | 100 | 70 | 100 | 12 | 432 |
| 3 | Martina Sáblíková | (Czech Republic) | 45 | 100 | 50 | 60 | | 150 | 405 |
| 4 | Nana Takagi | (Japan) | 80 | 24 | 60 | 36 | 10 | 120 | 330 |
| 5 | Miho Takagi | (Japan) | 60 | 21 | 24 | 45 | 60 | 45 | 255 |
| 6 | Francesca Lollobrigida | (Italy) | | 28 | 40 | 28 | 40 | 106 | 242 |
| 7 | Claudia Pechstein | (Germany) | 36 | 45 | 32 | 50 | 50 | 21 | 234 |
| 8 | Kim Bo-reum | (South Korea) | 28 | 32 | 28 | 80 | | | 168 |
| 9 | Jun Ye-jin | (South Korea) | 6 | 36 | 70 | 24 | 24 | | 160 |
| 10 | Jelena Peeters | (Belgium) | 24 | 50 | 4 | 18 | 36 | 16 | 148 |
| 11 | Bente Kraus | (Germany) | 16 | | | 21 | 28 | 76 | 141 |
| 12 | Rixt Meijer | (Netherlands) | 50 | 60 | | 14 | | | 124 |
| 13 | Nikola Zdráhalová | (Czech Republic) | 12 | 12 | 12 | 12 | 32 | 40 | 120 |
| 14 | Kali Christ | (Canada) | | 14 | 45 | 40 | 18 | | 117 |
| 15 | Vanessa Bittner | (Austria) | 32 | 40 | | 2 | | 32 | 106 |
| 16 | Liu Jing | (China) | 10 | 8 | 36 | 8 | 21 | 18 | 101 |
| 17 | Mariska Huisman | (Netherlands) | | | | | 70 | 28 | 98 |
| 18 | Heather Richardson | (United States) | | | 2 | | | 90 | 92 |
| 19 | Natalya Voronina | (Russia) | 21 | 18 | 14 | 32 | | | 85 |
| 20 | Liu Yichi | (China) | 18 | | 18 | | 16 | 24 | 76 |
| 21 | Marina Zueva | (Belarus) | | | 21 | | 45 | | 66 |
| 22 | Aleksandra Goss | (Poland) | 14 | 10 | 8 | 10 | 4 | | 46 |
| 23 | Elena Møller-Rigas | (Denmark) | | | 16 | 16 | 12 | | 44 |
| 24 | Josie Spence | (Canada) | 40 | | | | | | 40 |
| 25 | Urszula Włodarczyk | (Poland) | 8 | 6 | 3 | 5 | 3 | | 25 |
| 26 | Saskia Alusalu | (Estonia) | | | 10 | 6 | 5 | | 21 |
| 27 | Maria Lamb | (United States) | | 16 | 2 | | | | 18 |
| 28 | Brittany Bowe | (United States) | | | | | | 14 | 14 |
| 29 | Frida van Megen | (Norway) | | | | | 14 | | 14 |
| 30 | Yvonne Daldossi | (Italy) | | 3 | 6 | 1 | | | 10 |
| 31 | Carlijn Schoutens | (United States) | | | | | 8 | | 8 |
| 32 | Zhang Xin | (China) | | 4 | | 3 | | | 7 |
| 33 | Erin Bartlett | (United States) | | | | | 6 | | 6 |
| 34 | Gabriele Hirschbichler | (Germany) | | 5 | | | | | 5 |
| 34 | Isabell Ost | (Germany) | | | 5 | | | | 5 |
| 36 | Tatyana Mikhailova | (Belarus) | | | | 4 | | | 4 |
| 37 | Natálie Kerschbaummayr | (Czech Republic) | | | | | 2 | | 2 |
| 38 | Sofie Haugen | (Norway) | | | | | 1 | | 1 |
