= 2014–15 ISU Speed Skating World Cup – World Cup 5 – Women's 1500 metres =

The women's 1500 metres race of the 2014–15 ISU Speed Skating World Cup 5, arranged in the Vikingskipet arena in Hamar, Norway, was held on 31 January 2015.

Heather Richardson of the United States won, followed by Brittany Bowe of the United States in second place, and Marije Joling of the Netherlands in third place. Carlijn Achtereekte of the Netherlands won Division B.

Elena Møller-Rigas of Denmark set a new national junior record in the B division.

== Results ==
The race took place on Saturday, 31 January, with Division B scheduled in the morning session, at 09:15, and Division A scheduled in the afternoon session, at 14:00.

=== Division A ===
Rank	Name	Nat.	Pair	Lane	Time	WC points	GWC points
1st place, gold medalist(s)	Heather Richardson	(United States)	10	o	1:56.30	100	100
2nd place, silver medalist(s)	Brittany Bowe	(United States)	8	o	1:57.30	80	80
3rd place, bronze medalist(s)	Marije Joling	(Netherlands)	7	i	1:57.51	70	70
4	Yuliya Skokova	(Russia)	7	o	1:58.48	60	60
5	Linda de Vries	(Netherlands)	8	i	1:58.49	50	50
6	Martina Sáblíková	(Czech Republic)	9	o	1:58.60	45	—
7	Luiza Złotkowska	(Poland)	6	i	1:59.03	40	
8	Kali Christ	(Canada)	5	i	1:59.28	36	
9	Ida Njåtun	(Norway)	10	i	2:00.27	32	
10	Nana Takagi	(Japan)	6	o	2:00.35	28	
11	Ivanie Blondin	(Canada)	1	i	2:00.67	24	
12	Ayaka Kikuchi	(Japan)	5	o	2:00.80	21	
13	Kim Bo-reum	(South Korea)	2	i	2:00.99	18	
14	Gabriele Hirschbichler	(Germany)	3	i	2:01.09	16	
15	Zhao Xin	(China)	4	i	2:01.26	14	
16	Noh Seon-yeong	(South Korea)	3	o	2:01.39	12	
17	Katarzyna Woźniak	(Poland)	4	o	2:01.41	10	
18	Tatyana Mikhailova	(Belarus)	1	o	2:03.95	8	
19	Hege Bøkko	(Norway)	2	o	2:03.99	6	
20	Olga Graf	(Russia)	9	i	DQ		

=== Division B ===
Rank	Name	Nat.	Pair	Lane	Time	WC points
1	Carlijn Achtereekte	(Netherlands)	8	o	1:58.32	25
2	Jorien Voorhuis	(Netherlands)	10	i	1:58.70	19
3	Diane Valkenburg	(Netherlands)	9	i	1:59.36	15
4	Miho Takagi	(Japan)	9	o	1:59.52	11
5	Claudia Pechstein	(Germany)	11	o	2:00.28	8
6	Margarita Ryzhova	(Russia)	18	i	2:01.12	6
7	Yekaterina Aydova	(Kazakhstan)	10	o	2:01.62	4
8	Isabell Ost	(Germany)	17	i	2:01.85	2
9	Liu Jing	(China)	16	i	2:02.01	1
10	Francesca Lollobrigida	(Italy)	14	i	2:02.11	—
11	Natalya Voronina	(Russia)	7	i	2:02.12	
12	Hao Jiachen	(China)	6	i	2:02.50	
13	Maki Tabata	(Japan)	17	o	2:02.67	
14	Marina Zueva	(Belarus)	13	i	2:02.95	
15	Josie Spence	(Canada)	14	o	2:03.14	
16	Kelly Gunther	(United States)	8	i	2:03.43	
17	Aleksandra Kachurkina	(Russia)	15	o	2:03.53	
18	Aleksandra Goss	(Poland)	15	i	2:04.04	
19	Bente Kraus	(Germany)	16	o	2:04.08	
20	Frida van Megen	(Norway)	2	o	2:04.45	
21	Angelika Fudalej	(Poland)	3	o	2:04.48	
22	Shoko Fujimura	(Japan)	6	o	2:04.50	
23	Liu Yichi	(China)	4	i	2:04.55	
24	Nicole Garrido	(Canada)	5	i	2:05.28	
25	Jelena Peeters	(Belgium)	18	o	2:05.31	
26	Isabelle Weidemann	(Canada)	7	o	2:05.38	
27	Nikola Zdráhalová	(Czech Republic)	11	i	2:05.56	
28	Natálie Kerschbaummayr	(Czech Republic)	12	i	2:06.25	
29	Erin Bartlett	(United States)	3	i	2:06.55	
30	Carlijn Schoutens	(United States)	4	o	2:06.60	
31	Saskia Alusalu	(Estonia)	13	o	2:06.64	
32	Sofie Haugen	(Norway)	5	o	2:07.05	
33	Jun Ye-jin	(South Korea)	12	o	2:07.37	
34	Elena Møller-Rigas	(Denmark)	1	i	2:07.71 NRJ	
35	Urszula Włodarczyk	(Poland)	2	i	DNF	

Note: NRJ = national record for juniors.
