= 2014–15 ISU Speed Skating World Cup – World Cup 5 – Women's 3000 metres =

2015 speed skating race

The women's 3000 metres race of the 2014–15 ISU Speed Skating World Cup 5, arranged in the Vikingskipet arena in Hamar, Norway, was held on 1 February 2015.

Martina Sáblíková of the Czech Republic won, followed by Carlijn Achtereekte of the Netherlands in second place, and Ireen Wüst of the Netherlands in third place. Heather Richardson of the United States won Division B.

In the B division, Marina Zueva of Belarus set a national record as she finished second, and Elena Møller-Rigas of Denmark set a new national junior record.

== Results ==
The race took place on Saturday, 1 February, with Division B scheduled in the morning session, at 09:15, and Division A scheduled in the afternoon session, at 13:15.

=== Division A ===
Rank	Name	Nat.	Pair	Lane	Time	WC points	GWC points
1st place, gold medalist(s)	Martina Sáblíková	(Czech Republic)	8	i	4:03.68	100	100
2nd place, silver medalist(s)	Carlijn Achtereekte	(Netherlands)	4	o	4:05.13	80	80
3rd place, bronze medalist(s)	Ireen Wüst	(Netherlands)	8	o	4:05.20	70	70
4	Marije Joling	(Netherlands)	6	o	4:06.70	60	60
5	Jorien Voorhuis	(Netherlands)	6	i	4:07.87	50	50
6	Diane Valkenburg	(Netherlands)	5	o	4:09.22	45	—
7	Olga Graf	(Russia)	5	i	4:09.75	40	
8	Claudia Pechstein	(Germany)	7	i	4:10.81	35	
9	Ida Njåtun	(Norway)	2	o	4:11.95	30	
10	Luiza Złotkowska	(Poland)	1	o	4:12.37	25	
11	Kim Bo-reum	(South Korea)	3	o	4:12.38	21	
12	Yuliya Skokova	(Russia)	2	i	4:12.48	18	
13	Bente Kraus	(Germany)	4	i	4:12.76	16	
14	Natalya Voronina	(Russia)	1	i	4:14.55	14	
15	Nana Takagi	(Japan)	3	i	4:15.58	12	
16	Ivanie Blondin	(Canada)	7	o	DQ		

=== Division B ===
Rank	Name	Nat.	Pair	Lane	Time	WC points
1	Heather Richardson	(United States)	6	o	4:09.46	32
2	Marina Zueva	(Belarus)	11	i	4:12.96 NR	27
3	Francesca Lollobrigida	(Italy)	13	o	4:13.10	23
4	Miho Takagi	(Japan)	5	i	4:13.13	19
5	Isabell Ost	(Germany)	13	i	4:13.27	15
6	Anna Chernova	(Russia)	16	i	4:13.89	11
7	Katarzyna Woźniak	(Poland)	14	i	4:14.92	9
8	Ayaka Kikuchi	(Japan)	15	i	4:15.07	7
9	Kali Christ	(Canada)	10	i	4:15.32	6
10	Aleksandra Goss	(Poland)	11	o	4:15.39	5
11	Zhao Xin	(China)	14	o	4:15.59	4
12	Jelena Peeters	(Belgium)	15	o	4:15.87	3
13	Shoko Fujimura	(Japan)	16	o	4:16.10	2
14	Liu Jing	(China)	12	o	4:16.41	1
15	Frida van Megen	(Norway)	2	i	4:17.02	—
16	Margarita Ryzhova	(Russia)	2	o	4:17.20	
17	Maki Tabata	(Japan)	12	i	4:17.71	
18	Isabelle Weidemann	(Canada)	4	i	4:18.20	
19	Josie Spence	(Canada)	9	i	4:18.68	
20	Angelika Fudalej	(Poland)	9	o	4:19.33	
21	Nikola Zdráhalová	(Czech Republic)	7	i	4:20.04	
22	Hao Jiachen	(China)	1	i	4:20.16	
23	Nicole Garrido	(Canada)	5	o	4:20.21	
24	Liu Yichi	(China)	1	o	4:21.09	
25	Tatyana Mikhailova	(Belarus)	3	i	4:21.72	
26	Saskia Alusalu	(Estonia)	10	o	4:21.73	
27	Carlijn Schoutens	(United States)	8	o	4:22.67	
28	Natálie Kerschbaummayr	(Czech Republic)	6	i	4:22.88	
29	Elena Møller-Rigas	(Denmark)	7	o	4:23.32 NRJ	
30	Urszula Włodarczyk	(Poland)	8	i	4:25.13	
31	Erin Bartlett	(United States)	3	o	4:27.67	
32	Sofie Haugen	(Norway)	4	o	4:29.12	

Note: NR = national record, NRJ = national record for juniors.
