= 2014–15 ISU Speed Skating World Cup – World Cup 3 – Men's 500 metres =

The men's 500 metres races of the 2014–15 ISU Speed Skating World Cup 3, arranged in Sportforum Hohenschönhausen, in Berlin, Germany, were held on the weekend of 5–7 December 2014.

Race one was won by Artur Waś of Poland, while Laurent Dubreuil of Canada came second, and Michel Mulder of the Netherlands came third. Mirko Giacomo Nenzi of Italy won Division B of race one, and was thus, under the rules, automatically promoted to Division A for race two. Christian Oberbichler of Switzerland set a new national record with a time of 36.15.

In race two, Waś won again, while Espen Aarnes Hvammen of Norway came second, and Dubreuil had to settle for third. Xie Jiaxuan of China won Division B of race two.

== Race 1 ==
Race one took place on Friday, 5 December, with Division B scheduled in the morning session, at 13:37, and Division A scheduled in the afternoon session, at 17:29.

=== Division A ===
Rank	Name	Nat.	Pair	Lane	Time	WC points	GWC points
1st place, gold medalist(s)	Artur Waś	(Poland)	1	o	35.01	100	50
2nd place, silver medalist(s)	Laurent Dubreuil	(Canada)	8	i	35.09	80	40
3rd place, bronze medalist(s)	Michel Mulder	(Netherlands)	1	i	35.12	70	35
4	Ryohei Haga	(Japan)	6	i	35.13	60	30
5	Nico Ihle	(Germany)	8	o	35.17	50	25
6	Artyom Kuznetsov	(Russia)	4	o	35.23	45	—
7	Mo Tae-bum	(South Korea)	9	o	35.26	40	
8	Gilmore Junio	(Canada)	6	o	35.28	36	
9	Kim Jun-ho	(South Korea)	5	o	35.32	32	
10	Espen Aarnes Hvammen	(Norway)	7	i	35.34	28	
11	Denis Koval	(Russia)	5	i	35.40	24	
12	Aleksey Yesin	(Russia)	3	o	35.43	21	
13	Hein Otterspeer	(Netherlands)	7	o	35.45	18	
14	Jan Smeekens	(Netherlands)	10	o	35.50	16	
15	Denny Ihle	(Germany)	2	o	35.52	14	
16	Pim Schipper	(Netherlands)	2	i	35.58	12	
17	Ruslan Murashov	(Russia)	9	i	35.63	10	
18	Yūya Oikawa	(Japan)	3	i	35.65	8	
19	Keiichiro Nagashima	(Japan)	4	i	35.98	6	
20	Pavel Kulizhnikov	(Russia)	10	i	DQ		

=== Division B ===
Rank	Name	Nat.	Pair	Lane	Time	WC points
1	Mirko Giacomo Nenzi	(Italy)	16	o	35.40	25
2	Samuel Schwarz	(Germany)	12	o	35.44	19
3	Mika Poutala	(Finland)	6	o	35.49	15
4	Lee Kang-seok	(South Korea)	17	o	35.56	11
5	Mitchell Whitmore	(United States)	7	o	35.63	8
6	Mu Zhongsheng	(China)	15	i	35.64	6
7	Gerbena Jorritsma	(Netherlands)	17	i	35.68	4
8	Artur Nogal	(Poland)	14	o	35.75	2
9	Richard Maclennan	(Canada)	15	o	35.76	1
10	Xie Jiaxuan	(China)	12	i	35.77	—
11	Wang Nan	(China)	13	o	35.81	
12	Tsubasa Hasegawa	(Japan)	14	i	35.879	
12	Piotr Michalski	(Poland)	10	i	35.879	
14	Håvard Holmefjord Lorentzen	(Norway)	10	o	35.882	
15	William Dutton	(Canada)	16	i	35.887	
16	David Bosa	(Italy)	11	o	35.91	
17	Tyler Derraugh	(Canada)	5	i	35.96	
18	Jonathan Garcia	(United States)	4	i	36.07	
19	Shani Davis	(United States)	11	i	36.10	
20	Denis Dressel	(Germany)	9	i	36.11	
21	Pekka Koskela	(Finland)	6	i	36.13	
22	Christian Oberbichler	(Switzerland)	2	i	36.15 NR	
23	Christoffer Fagerli Rukke	(Norway)	5	o	36.17	
24	Daichi Yamanaka	(Japan)	13	i	36.22	
25	Kimani Griffin	(United States)	4	o	36.27	
26	Luca Zanghellini	(Italy)	8	i	36.42	
27	Aleksandr Zhigin	(Kazakhstan)	8	o	36.58	
28	Juho Vaittinen	(Finland)	1	i	36.60	
29	Denis Kuzin	(Kazakhstan)	9	o	36.611	
30	Joel Dufter	(Germany)	2	o	36.615	
31	Yevgeny Kazimirenko	(Belarus)	3	i	36.83	
32	David Andersson	(Sweden)	3	o	37.00	
33	Benjamin Macé	(France)	7	i	37.01	

Notes: NR = national record.

== Race 2 ==
Race two took place on Sunday, 7 December, with Division B scheduled in the morning session, at 09:18, and Division A scheduled in the afternoon session, at 14:59.

=== Division A ===
Rank	Name	Nat.	Pair	Lane	Time	WC points	GWC points
1st place, gold medalist(s)	Artur Waś	(Poland)	10	i	35.04	100	50
2nd place, silver medalist(s)	Espen Aarnes Hvammen	(Norway)	7	o	35.06	80	40
3rd place, bronze medalist(s)	Laurent Dubreuil	(Canada)	10	o	35.09	70	35
4	Denis Koval	(Russia)	6	o	35.10	60	30
5	Mo Tae-bum	(South Korea)	7	i	35.12	50	25
6	Jan Smeekens	(Netherlands)	2	o	35.13	45	—
7	Michel Mulder	(Netherlands)	9	o	35.21	40	
8	Nico Ihle	(Germany)	9	i	35.22	36	
9	Kim Jun-ho	(South Korea)	5	i	35.23	32	
10	Hein Otterspeer	(Netherlands)	2	i	35.27	28	
11	Aleksey Yesin	(Russia)	3	i	35.29	24	
12	Mirko Giacomo Nenzi	(Italy)	4	i	35.35	21	
13	Keiichiro Nagashima	(Japan)	3	o	35.38	18	
14	Gilmore Junio	(Canada)	6	i	35.39	16	
15	Ryohei Haga	(Japan)	8	o	35.41	14	
16	Artyom Kuznetsov	(Russia)	8	i	35.42	12	
17	Pim Schipper	(Netherlands)	5	o	35.44	10	
18	Yūya Oikawa	(Japan)	4	o	35.60	8	
19	Denny Ihle	(Germany)	1	i	35.83	6	

=== Division B ===
Rank	Name	Nat.	Pair	Lane	Time	WC points
1	Xie Jiaxuan	(China)	12	o	35.55	25
2	Gerben Jorritsma	(Netherlands)	13	o	35.58	19
3	Mu Zhongsheng	(China)	14	o	35.64	15
4	Mika Poutala	(Finland)	14	i	35.66	11
5	Wang Nan	(China)	9	i	35.69	8
6	Richard Maclennan	(Canada)	10	i	35.70	6
7	David Bosa	(Italy)	8	i	35.83	4
8	Mitchell Whitmore	(United States)	12	i	35.84	2
9	Artur Nogal	(Poland)	11	i	35.85	1
10	Lee Kang-seok	(Italy)	13	i	35.88	—
11	William Dutton	(Canada)	9	o	35.97	
12	Daichi Yamanaka	(Japan)	3	o	36.11	
13	Tyler Derraugh	(Canada)	8	o	36.16	
14	Jonathan Garcia	(United States)	7	o	36.19	
15	Piotr Michalski	(Poland)	11	o	36.26	
16	Denis Dressel	(Germany)	6	o	36.31	
17	Sebastian Richter	(Germany)	2	i	36.320	
18	Christian Oberbichler	(Switzerland)	4	o	36.326	
19	Kimani Griffin	(United States)	6	i	36.35	
20	Luca Zanghellini	(Italy)	2	o	36.39	
21	Joel Dufter	(Germany)	5	i	36.56	
22	Christoffer Fagerli Rukke	(Norway)	7	i	36.58	
23	Pekka Koskela	(Finland)	5	o	36.69	
24	David Andersson	(Sweden)	4	i	36.83	
25	Tommi Pulli	(Finland)	3	i	37.14	
26	Yevgeny Kazimirenko	(Belarus)	1	o	37.24	
27	Benjamin Macé	(France)	1	i	37.28	
28	Tsubasa Hasegawa	(Japan)	10	o	53.51	
