= 2014–15 ISU Speed Skating World Cup – World Cup 5 =

The fifth competition weekend of the 2014–15 ISU Speed Skating World Cup was held in the Vikingskipet arena in Hamar, Norway, from Saturday, 31 January, until Sunday, 1 February 2015.

There were no world records set during the weekend, but Marina Zueva of Belarus set a national record as she finished second in the B division of the women's 3000 m on Sunday, and Elena Møller-Rigas of Denmark set new national junior records on both 1500 m and 3000 m.

== Schedule ==
The detailed schedule of events:

Date	Session	Events	Comment
Saturday, 31 January	Morning	09:15: 1500 m women 10:44: 5000 m men	Division B
Saturday, 31 January	Afternoon	14:00: 1500 m women 14:50: 5000 m men	Division A
Sunday, 1 February	Morning	09:15: 3000 m women 10:40: 1500 m men	Division B
Sunday, 1 February	Afternoon	13:15: 3000 m women 14:19: 1500 m men	Division A
Sunday, 1 February	Afternoon	15:09: Mass start women 15:31: Mass start men	

All times are CET (UTC+1).

== Medal summary ==
=== Men's events ===
Event	Gold	Time	Silver	Time	Bronze	Time	Report
1500 m	Denis Yuskov; Russia	1:45.07	Kjeld Nuis; Netherlands	1:45.80	Denny Morrison; Canada	1:46.03	
5000 m	Jorrit Bergsma; Netherlands	6:17.89	Douwe de Vries; Netherlands	6:23.04	Sverre Lunde Pedersen; Norway	6:23.21	
Mass start	Lee Seung-hoon; South Korea	60 ^{A}	Marco Weber; Germany	40 ^{A}	Bart Swings; Belgium	25 ^{A}	

^{A} In mass start, race points are accumulated during the race. The skater with most race points is the winner.

=== Women's events ===
Event	Gold	Time	Silver	Time	Bronze	Time	Report
1500 m	Heather Richardson; United States	1:56.30	Brittany Bowe; United States	1:57.30	Marije Joling; Netherlands	1:57.51	
3000 m	Martina Sáblíková; Czech Republic	4:02.84	Carlijn Achtereekte; Netherlands	4:05.95	Ireen Wüst; Netherlands	4:03.14	
Mass start	Irene Schouten; Netherlands	61 ^{A}	Ivanie Blondin; Canada	40 ^{A}	Mariska Huisman; Netherlands	23 ^{A}	

^{A} In mass start, race points are accumulated during the race. The skater with most race points is the winner.
