= 2014–15 ISU Speed Skating World Cup – World Cup 4 – Men's 500 metres =

The men's 500 metres races of the 2014–15 ISU Speed Skating World Cup 4, arranged in the Thialf arena in Heerenveen, Netherlands, were held on the weekend of 12–14 December 2014.

Race one was won by Pavel Kulizhnikov of Russia, while Artur Waś of Poland came second, and Laurent Dubreuil of France came third. Pim Schipper of the Netherlands won Division B of race one, and was thus, under the rules, automatically promoted to Division A for race two. Christian Oberbichler of Austria set a new national record for the second straight weekend.

Kulizhnikov and Waś also took the first two places in race two, while Jan Smeekens of the Netherlands came third. Yūya Oikawa of Japan won Division B of race two.

== Race 1 ==
Race one took place on Friday, 12 December, with Division B scheduled in the morning session, at 12:40, and Division A scheduled in the afternoon session, at 17:22.

=== Division A ===
Rank	Name	Nat.	Pair	Lane	Time	WC points	GWC points
1st place, gold medalist(s)	Pavel Kulizhnikov	(Russia)	10	i	34.63	100	50
2nd place, silver medalist(s)	Artur Waś	(Poland)	7	i	34.91	80	40
3rd place, bronze medalist(s)	Laurent Dubreuil	(Canada)	10	o	35.16	70	35
4	Michel Mulder	(Netherlands)	3	i	35.19	60	30
5	Mika Poutala	(Finland)	1	o	35.22	50	25
6	Ryohei Haga	(Japan)	7	o	35.23	45	—
7	Denis Koval	(Russia)	6	i	35.257	40	
8	Hein Otterspeer	(Netherlands)	6	o	35.258	36	
9	Kim Jun-ho	(South Korea)	5	o	35.27	32	
10	Mirko Giacomo Nenzi	(Italy)	2	o	35.33	28	
11	Keiichiro Nagashima	(Japan)	3	o	35.34	24	
12	Espen Aarnes Hvammen	(Norway)	8	o	35.36	21	
13	Mo Tae-bum	(South Korea)	9	o	35.38	18	
14	Artyom Kuznetsov	(Russia)	4	i	35.43	16	
15	Gilmore Junio	(Canada)	5	i	35.45	14	
16	Jan Smeekens	(Netherlands)	9	i	35.47	12	
17	Xie Jiaxuan	(China)	1	i	35.59	10	
18	Gerben Jorritsma	(Netherlands)	2	i	35.68	8	
19	Nico Ihle	(Germany)	8	i	DQ		
19	Aleksey Yesin	(Russia)	4	o	DQ		

=== Division B ===
Rank	Name	Nat.	Pair	Lane	Time	WC points
1	Pim Schipper	(Netherlands)	17	o	35.37	25
2	Mu Zhongsheng	(China)	16	i	35.41	19
3	Samuel Schwarz	(Germany)	14	o	35.44	15
4	Tsubasa Hasegawa	(Japan)	13	i	35.53	11
5	Mitchell Whitmore	(United States)	11	i	35.61	8
6	Artur Nogal	(Poland)	13	o	35.70	6
7	Christian Oberbichler	(Switzerland)	7	i	35.71 NR	4
8	Yūya Oikawa	(Japan)	17	i	35.72	2
9	Denny Ihle	(Germany)	15	o	35.75	1
10	Lee Kang-seok	(South Korea)	16	o	35.76	—
11	Håvard Holmefjord Lorentzen	(Norway)	9	i	35.78	
12	David Bosa	(Italy)	11	o	35.80	
13	Jonathan Garcia	(United States)	8	i	35.86	
14	Richard Maclennan	(Canada)	14	i	35.91	
15	William Dutton	(Canada)	15	i	35.93	
16	Wang Nan	(China)	12	i	35.94	
17	Tyler Derraugh	(Canada)	9	o	35.95	
18	Daichi Yamanaka	(Japan)	12	o	36.05	
19	Piotr Michalski	(Poland)	10	o	36.12	
20	Shani Davis	(United States)	10	i	36.161	
21	Juho Vaittinen	(Finland)	4	i	36.166	
22	Christoffer Fagerli Rukke	(Norway)	7	o	36.28	
23	Luca Zanghellini	(Italy)	5	i	36.391	
24	Kimani Griffin	(United States)	6	o	36.395	
25	Aleksandr Zhigin	(Kazakhstan)	5	o	36.399	
26	Mikhail Kozlov	(Russia)	1	i	36.43	
27	Denis Dressel	(Germany)	8	o	36.47	
28	Denis Kuzin	(Kazakhstan)	6	i	36.53	
29	David Andersson	(Sweden)	3	i	36.54	
30	Benjamin Macé	(France)	3	o	36.61	
31	Yevgeny Kazimirenko	(Belarus)	4	o	36.79	
32	Tommi Pulli	(Finland)	2	o	36.83	
33	Armin Hager	(Austria)	2	i	37.05	

Notes: NR = national record.

== Race 2 ==
Race two took place on Sunday, 14 December, with Division B scheduled in the morning session, at 12:09, and Division A scheduled in the afternoon session, at 16:29.

=== Division A ===
Rank	Name	Nat.	Pair	Lane	Time	WC points	GWC points
1st place, gold medalist(s)	Pavel Kulizhnikov	(Russia)	11	o	34.58	100	50
2nd place, silver medalist(s)	Artur Waś	(Poland)	10	o	34.87	80	40
3rd place, bronze medalist(s)	Jan Smeekens	(Netherlands)	5	o	35.01	70	35
4	Laurent Dubreuil	(Canada)	11	i	35.072	60	30
5	Mika Poutala	(Finland)	10	i	35.073	50	25
6	Mo Tae-bum	(South Korea)	2	i	35.09	45	—
7	Michel Mulder	(Netherlands)	9	o	35.10	40	
8	Gilmore Junio	(Canada)	6	o	35.12	36	
9	Nico Ihle	(Germany)	2	o	35.13	32	
10	Hein Otterspeer	(Netherlands)	8	i	35.144	28	
10	Aleksey Yesin	(Russia)	1	i	35.144	28	
12	Kim Jun-ho	(South Korea)	7	i	35.22	21	
13	Denis Koval	(Russia)	8	o	35.23	18	
14	Espen Aarnes Hvammen	(Norway)	4	i	35.25	16	
15	Pim Schipper	(Netherlands)	3	i	35.34	14	
16	Gerben Jorritsma	(Netherlands)	3	o	35.35	12	
17	Mirko Giacomo Nenzi	(Italy)	6	i	35.37	10	
18	Ryohei Haga	(Japan)	9	i	35.49	8	
19	Xie Jiaxuan	(China)	4	o	35.58	6	
20	Keiichiro Nagashima	(Japan)	5	i	35.61	5	
21	Artyom Kuznetsov	(Russia)	7	o	DQ		

=== Division B ===
Rank	Name	Nat.	Pair	Lane	Time	WC points
1	Yūya Oikawa	(Japan)	9	o	35.49	25
2	Artur Nogal	(Poland)	13	i	35.54	19
3	Mitchell Whitmore	(United States)	11	o	35.70	15
4	William Dutton	(Canada)	6	o	35.72	11
5	Richard Maclennan	(Canada)	7	o	35.74	8
6	Denny Ihle	(Germany)	12	i	35.82	6
7	Tsubasa Hasegawa	(Japan)	12	o	35.83	4
8	Lee Kang-seok	(South Korea)	11	i	35.84	2
9	Piotr Michalski	(Poland)	7	i	35.884	1
10	Mu Zhongsheng	(China)	13	o	35.887	—
11	Jonathan Garcia	(United States)	8	o	35.92	
12	Pekka Koskela	(Finland)	1	i	35.93	
13	Christian Oberbichler	(Switzerland)	10	o	35.94	
14	Kirill Golubev	(Russia)	1	o	35.96	
15	Tyler Derraugh	(Canada)	9	i	36.021	
16	David Bosa	(Italy)	10	i	36.022	
17	Daichi Yamanaka	(Japan)	8	i	36.06	
18	Wang Nan	(China)	5	o	36.10	
19	Denis Dressel	(Germany)	4	i	36.22	
20	Luca Zanghellini	(Italy)	3	o	36.31	
21	Kimani Griffin	(United States)	5	i	36.33	
22	Christoffer Fagerli Rukke	(Norway)	6	i	36.46	
23	Juho Vaittinen	(Finland)	4	o	36.51	
24	Yevgeny Kazimirenko	(Belarus)	2	i	36.79	
25	David Andersson	(Sweden)	2	o	36.92	
26	Benjamin Macé	(France)	3	i	DNS	
