= 2014–15 ISU Speed Skating World Cup – World Cup 5 – Women's mass start =

The women's mass start race of the 2014–15 ISU Speed Skating World Cup 5, arranged in the Vikingskipet arena in Hamar, Norway, was held on 1 February 2015.

Irene Schouten of the Netherlands won the race, while Ivanie Blondin of Canada came second, and Mariska Huisman of the Netherlands came third.

== Results ==
The race took place on Saturday, 1 February, scheduled in the afternoon session, at 15:09.

				Race points							
Rank	Name	Nat.	Laps	Split 1	Split 2	Split 3	Finish	Total	Time	WC points	GWC points
1st place, gold medalist(s)	Irene Schouten	(Netherlands)	16	1			60	61	8:47.47	100	100
2nd place, silver medalist(s)	Ivanie Blondin	(Canada)	16				40	40	8:47.51	80	80
3rd place, bronze medalist(s)	Mariska Huisman	(Netherlands)	16		3		20	23	8:47.67	70	70
4	Miho Takagi	(Japan)	16	5				5	8:49.60	60	60
5	Claudia Pechstein	(Germany)	16		5			5	8:50.00	50	50
6	Marina Zueva	(Belarus)	16			5		5	8:51.25	45	—
7	Francesca Lollobrigida	(Italy)	16			3		3	8:47.83	40	
8	Jelena Peeters	(Belgium)	16	3				3	8:49.96	36	
9	Nikola Zdráhalová	(Czech Republic)	16		1			1	8:50.75	32	
10	Bente Kraus	(Germany)	16			1		1	8:50.99	28	
11	Jun Ye-jin	(South Korea)	16					0	8:47.89	24	
12	Liu Jing	(China)	16					0	8:49.02	21	
13	Kali Christ	(Canada)	16					0	8:49.20	18	
14	Liu Yichi	(China)	16					0	8:49.32	16	
15	Frida van Megen	(Norway)	16					0	8:49.35	14	
16	Elena Møller-Rigas	(Denmark)	16					0	8:50.13	12	
17	Nana Takagi	(Japan)	16					0	8:50.48	10	
18	Carlijn Schoutens	(United States)	16					0	8:50.77	8	
19	Erin Bartlett	(United States)	16					0	8:50.85	6	
20	Saskia Alusalu	(Estonia)	16					0	8:51.35	5	
21	Aleksandra Goss	(Poland)	16					0	8:51.93	4	
22	Urszula Włodarczyk	(Poland)	16					0	8:52.11	3	
23	Natálie Kerschbaummayr	(Czech Republic)	16					0	8:52.33	2	
24	Sofie Haugen	(Norway)	16					0	8:52.47	1	
25	Kim Bo-reum	(South Korea)	15					0	8:21.19	–	
