= 2014–15 ISU Speed Skating World Cup – World Cup 6 – Women's 1000 metres =

The women's 1000 metres races of the 2014–15 ISU Speed Skating World Cup 6, arranged in the Thialf arena in Heerenveen, Netherlands, were held on the weekend of 7–8 February 2015. It was the only competition weekend of the season where the distance was skated twice.

Race one was won by Heather Richardson of the United States, while Brittany Bowe of the United States came second, and Li Qishi of China came third. Thijsje Oenema of the Netherlands won Division B of race one, and was thus, under the rules, automatically promoted to Division A for race two.

Race two was won by Brittany Bowe of the United States, while Marrit Leenstra of the Netherlands came second, and Karolína Erbanová of the Czech Republic came third. Annouk van der Weijden of the Netherlands won Division B of race two.

== Race 1 ==
Race one took place on Saturday, 7 February, with Division B scheduled in the morning session, at 12:51, and Division A scheduled in the afternoon session, at 16:33.

=== Division A ===
Rank	Name	Nat.	Pair	Lane	Time	WC points	GWC points
1st place, gold medalist(s)	Heather Richardson	(United States)	8	i	1:14.87	100	50
2nd place, silver medalist(s)	Brittany Bowe	(United States)	8	o	1:15.38	80	40
3rd place, bronze medalist(s)	Li Qishi	(China)	10	i	1:15.89	70	35
4	Karolína Erbanová	(Czech Republic)	9	i	1:15.95	60	30
5	Ireen Wüst	(Netherlands)	9	o	1:16.32	50	25
6	Marrit Leenstra	(Netherlands)	10	o	1:16.36	45	—
7	Kali Christ	(Canada)	3	i	1:16.90	40	
8	Vanessa Bittner	(Austria)	5	o	1:17.041	36	
9	Laurine van Riessen	(Netherlands)	5	i	1:17.045	32	
10	Yekaterina Aydova	(Kazakhstan)	4	o	1:17.24	28	
11	Margot Boer	(Netherlands)	1	o	1:17.35	24	
12	Nao Kodaira	(Japan)	7	i	1:17.48	21	
13	Judith Hesse	(Germany)	6	o	1:17.82	18	
14	Hege Bøkko	(Norway)	1	i	1:17.97	16	
15	Ida Njåtun	(Norway)	6	i	1:17.99	14	
16	Ayaka Kikuchi	(Japan)	2	i	1:18.05	12	
17	Olga Fatkulina	(Russia)	7	o	1:18.18	10	
18	Park Seung-hi	(South Korea)	4	i	1:18.65	8	
19	Nana Takagi	(Japan)	2	o	1:18.91	6	
20	Miyako Sumiyoshi	(Japan)	3	o	1:19.04	5	

=== Division B ===
Rank	Name	Nat.	Pair	Lane	Time	WC points
1	Thijsje Oenema	(Netherlands)	8	o	1:17.34	25
2	Luiza Złotkowska	(Poland)	11	o	1:18.71	19
3	Gabriele Hirschbichler	(Germany)	12	o	1:18.87	15
4	Zhang Xin	(China)	9	i	1:19.09	11
5	Miho Takagi	(Japan)	11	i	1:19.35	8
6	Nadezhda Aseyeva	(Russia)	12	i	1:19.37	6
7	Sha Yuning	(China)	9	o	1:19.40	4
8	Zhao Xin	(China)	3	i	1:19.59	2
9	Kelly Gunther	(United States)	5	o	1:19.69	1
10	Sugar Todd	(United States)	7	i	1:20.08	—
11	Li Huawei	(China)	10	i	1:20.11	
12	Katarzyna Woźniak	(Poland)	8	i	1:20.16	
13	Irina Arshinova	(Russia)	3	o	1:20.19	
14	Tatyana Mikhailova	(Belarus)	6	i	1:20.23	
15	Jessica Gregg	(Canada)	4	o	1:20.56	
16	Yvonne Daldossi	(Italy)	5	i	1:20.72	
17	Tamara Oudenaarden	(Canada)	4	i	1:21.15	
18	Ksenia Sadovskaya	(Belarus)	2	i	1:21.33	
19	Heather McLean	(Canada)	7	o	1:21.69	
20	Alexandra Ianculescu	(Canada)	10	o	1:21.89	
21	Linda Bortolotti	(Italy)	1	i	1:22.19	
22	Alexandra Goss	(Poland)	2	o	1:22.37	
23	Elina Risku	(Finland)	6	o	1:22.46	

== Race 2 ==
Race two took place on Sunday, 8 February, with Division B scheduled in the morning session, at 12:25, and Division A scheduled in the afternoon session, at 16:24.

=== Division A ===
Rank	Name	Nat.	Pair	Lane	Time	WC points	GWC points
1st place, gold medalist(s)	Brittany Bowe	(United States)	6	i	1:15.63	100	50
2nd place, silver medalist(s)	Marrit Leenstra	(Netherlands)	5	i	1:15.75	80	40
3rd place, bronze medalist(s)	Karolína Erbanová	(Czech Republic)	5	o	1:15.98	70	35
4	Li Qishi	(China)	6	o	1:16.28	60	30
5	Laurine van Riessen	(Netherlands)	4	o	1:16.89	50	25
6	Margot Boer	(Netherlands)	2	i	1:16.93	45	—
7	Vanessa Bittner	(Austria)	4	i	1:17.57	40	
8	Ayaka Kikuchi	(Japan)	2	o	1:18.14	36	
9	Gabriele Hirschbichler	(Germany)	1	i	1:18.15	32	
10	Nana Takagi	(Japan)	3	i	1:18.21	28	
11	Hege Bøkko	(Norway)	3	o	1:18.39	24	
12	Miyako Sumiyoshi	(Japan)	1	o	1:20.08	21	

=== Division B ===
Rank	Name	Nat.	Pair	Lane	Time	WC points
1	Annouk van der Weijden	(Netherlands)	1	i	1:17.99	25
2	Li Huawei	(China)	7	o	1:19.28	19
3	Kelly Gunther	(United States)	11	i	1:19.48	15
4	Miho Takagi	(Japan)	11	o	1:19.51	11
5	Nadezhda Aseyeva	(Russia)	10	o	1:19.54	8
6	Zhang Xin	(China)	12	o	1:19.83	6
7	Zhao Xin	(China)	9	o	1:19.89	4
8	Jessica Gregg	(Canada)	9	i	1:20.03	2
9	Maki Tsuji	(Japan)	3	i	1:20.08	1
10	Sugar Todd	(United States)	8	o	1:20.39	—
11	Tatyana Mikhailova	(Belarus)	6	o	1:20.44	
12	Alexandra Ianculescu	(Canada)	7	i	1:20.522	
13	Irina Arshinova	(Russia)	10	i	1:20.525	
14	Yvonne Daldossi	(Italy)	5	o	1:20.90	
15	Heather McLean	(Canada)	8	i	1:21.13	
16	Marsha Hudey	(United States)	2	i	1:21.19	
17	Sha Yuning	(China)	12	i	1:21.36	
18	Elina Risku	(Finland)	5	i	1:21.49	
19	Tamara Oudenaarden	(Canada)	4	o	1:21.58	
20	Yuliya Kozyreva	(Russia)	4	i	1:22.20	
21	Alexandra Goss	(Poland)	6	i	1:22.36	
22	Ksenia Sadovskaya	(Belarus)	3	o	1:22.57	
23	Linda Bortolotti	(Italy)	2	o	1:22.88	
