= 2014–15 ISU Speed Skating World Cup – World Cup 6 – Men's 1000 metres =

The men's 1000 metres races of the 2014–15 ISU Speed Skating World Cup 6, arranged in the Thialf arena in Heerenveen, Netherlands, were held on the weekend of 7–8 February 2015.

Race one was won by Kjeld Nuis of the Netherlands, while Pavel Kulizhnikov of Russia came second, and Nico Ihle of Germany came third. Joey Mantia of the United States won Division B of race one, and was thus, under the rules, automatically promoted to Division A for race two.

Nuis and Kulizhnikov were first and second in race two, while Stefan Groothuis of the Netherlands came third. Haralds Silovs of Latvia won Division B of race two.

== Race 1 ==
Race one took place on Saturday, 7 February, with Division B scheduled in the morning session, at 12:51, and Division A scheduled in the afternoon session, at 17:19.

=== Division A ===
Rank	Name	Nat.	Pair	Lane	Time	WC points	GWC points
1st place, gold medalist(s)	Kjeld Nuis	(Netherlands)	10	o	1:08.76	100	50
2nd place, silver medalist(s)	Pavel Kulizhnikov	(Russia)	10	i	1:08.97	80	40
3rd place, bronze medalist(s)	Nico Ihle	(Germany)	9	o	1:09.06	70	35
4	Hein Otterspeer	(Netherlands)	8	i	1:09.17	60	30
5	Denny Morrison	(Canada)	6	i	1:09.35	50	25
6	Stefan Groothuis	(Netherlands)	8	o	1:09.45	45	—
7	Shani Davis	(United States)	7	i	1:09.555	40	
8	Samuel Schwarz	(Germany)	9	i	1:09.558	36	
9	Denis Kuzin	(Kazakhstan)	4	i	1:09.72	32	
10	Pim Schipper	(Netherlands)	1	i	1:09.76	28	
11	Michel Mulder	(Netherlands)	1	o	1:10.133	24	
12	Håvard Holmefjord Lorentzen	(Norway)	5	i	1:10.134	21	
13	Mo Tae-bum	(South Korea)	3	o	1:10.21	18	
14	Jonathan Garcia	(United States)	3	i	1:10.22	16	
15	Vincent De Haître	(Canada)	6	o	1:10.24	14	
16	Aleksey Yesin	(Russia)	7	o	1:10.27	12	
17	Yang Fan	(China)	5	o	1:10.58	10	
18	Richard Maclennan	(Canada)	4	o	1:10.84	8	
19	Kirill Golubev	(Russia)	2	i	1:10.90	6	
20	Denis Dressel	(Germany)	2	o	1:11.50	5	

=== Division B ===
Rank	Name	Nat.	Pair	Lane	Time	WC points
1	Joey Mantia	(United States)	18	o	1:10.29	25
2	Piotr Michalski	(Poland)	18	i	1:10.58	19
3	Tyler Derraugh	(Canada)	17	i	1:10.77	15
4	Espen Aarnes Hvammen	(Norway)	10	o	1:10.83	11
5	Roman Krech	(Kazakhstan)	7	o	1:11.07	8
6	Zbigniew Bródka	(Poland)	19	o	1:11.14	6
7	Jan Szymański	(Poland)	5	o	1:11.15	4
8	Jamie Gregg	(Canada)	8	i	1:11.20	2
9	Mirko Giacomo Nenzi	(Italy)	17	o	1:11.52	1
10	Mika Poutala	(Finland)	16	i	1:11.62	—
11	Kim Jin-su	(South Korea)	19	i	1:11.76	
12	Mitchell Whitmore	(United States)	14	i	1:11.79	
13	Christoffer Fagerli Rukke	(Norway)	14	o	1:11.94	
14	Tsukasa Owada	(Japan)	4	i	1:12.05	
15	Armin Hager	(Austria)	16	o	1:12.08	
16	Denny Ihle	(Germany)	11	o	1:12.20	
17	Shunsuke Nakamura	(Japan)	15	o	1:12.370	
18	Kimani Griffin	(United States)	13	i	1:12.374	
19	Tommi Pulli	(Finland)	13	o	1:12.40	
20	Pekka Koskela	(Finland)	8	o	1:12.43	
21	Johann Jørgen Sæves	(Norway)	6	o	1:12.45	
22	Bram Smallenbroek	(Austria)	12	i	1:12.53	
23	David Bosa	(Italy)	15	i	1:12.55	
24	Mu Zhongsheng	(China)	6	i	1:12.62	
25	Xie Jiaxuan	(China)	3	i	1:12.64	
26	Kim Jun-ho	(South Korea)	12	o	1:12.72	
27	Aleksandr Zhigin	(Kazakhstan)	11	i	1:12.82	
28	Wang Nan	(China)	3	o	1:12.90	
29	Shane Williamson	(Japan)	5	i	1:13.10	
30	Tsubasa Hasegawa	(Japan)	9	o	1:13.12	
31	Juho Vaittinen	(Finland)	9	i	1:13.19	
32	Luca Zanghellini	(Italy)	2	o	1:13.65	
33	Christian Oberbichler	(Switzerland)	1	i	1:13.74	
34	Maksim Baklashkin	(Kazakhstan)	10	i	1:13.80	
35	Koto Nakao	(Japan)	4	o	1:13.99	
36	Yevgeny Kazimirenko	(Belarus)	1	o	1:14.60	
37	Daniel Greig	(Australia)	7	i	1:19.28	
38	Dmitry Viskovsky	(Belarus)	2	i	DQ	

== Race 2 ==
Race two took place on Sunday, 8 February, with Division B scheduled in the morning session, at 13:11, and Division A scheduled in the afternoon session, at 17:13.

=== Division A ===
Rank	Name	Nat.	Pair	Lane	Time	WC points	GWC points
1st place, gold medalist(s)	Kjeld Nuis	(Netherlands)	9	i	1:08.81	100	50
2nd place, silver medalist(s)	Pavel Kulizhnikov	(Russia)	9	o	1:08.82	80	40
3rd place, bronze medalist(s)	Stefan Groothuis	(Netherlands)	7	i	1:09.38	70	35
4	Nico Ihle	(Germany)	8	i	1:09.50	60	30
5	Shani Davis	(United States)	8	o	1:09.52	50	25
6	Pim Schipper	(Netherlands)	6	o	1:09.67	45	—
7	Michel Mulder	(Netherlands)	6	i	1:09.74	40	
8	Aleksey Yesin	(Russia)	3	i	1:09.78	36	
9	Samuel Schwarz	(Germany)	7	o	1:10.09	32	
10	Vincent De Haître	(Canada)	4	i	1:10.16	28	
11	Håvard Holmefjord Lorentzen	(Norway)	5	o	1:10.44	24	
12	Richard Maclennan	(Canada)	1	i	1:10.56	21	
13	Tyler Derraugh	(Canada)	2	o	1:10.64	18	
14	Yang Fan	(China)	2	i	1:10.73	16	
15	Kirill Golubev	(Russia)	4	o	1:10.75	14	
16	Piotr Michalski	(Poland)	3	o	1:10.77	12	
17	Denis Dressel	(Germany)	1	o	1:11.62	10	
18	Mo Tae-bum	(South Korea)	5	i	DNS		

=== Division B ===
Rank	Name	Nat.	Pair	Lane	Time	WC points
1	Haralds Silovs	(Latvia)	3	o	1:10.87	25
2	Mirko Giacomo Nenzi	(Italy)	15	i	1:10.91	19
3	Bart Swings	(Belgium)	2	o	1:11.08	15
4	Pekka Koskela	(Finland)	9	i	1:11.25	11
5	Mika Poutala	(Finland)	15	o	1:11.40	8
6	Mu Zhongsheng	(China)	10	o	1:11.64	6
7	Alexandre St-Jean	(Canada)	1	o	1:11.68	4
8	Wang Nan	(China)	6	i	1:11.74	2
9	Jamie Gregg	(Canada)	16	o	1:11.84	1
10	Artur Nogal	(Poland)	1	i	1:11.89	—
11	Christoffer Fagerli Rukke	(Norway)	14	i	1:12.12	
12	Kimani Griffin	(United States)	13	o	1:12.13	
13	Armin Hager	(Austria)	13	i	1:12.17	
14	Tsukasa Owada	(Japan)	14	o	1:12.18	
15	Bram Smallenbroek	(Austria)	12	o	1:12.28	
16	Xie Jiaxuan	(China)	9	o	1:12.30	
17	Johann Jørgen Sæves	(Norway)	8	i	1:12.36	
18	Denny Ihle	(Germany)	12	i	1:12.43	
19	Shunsuke Nakamura	(Japan)	11	i	1:12.54	
20	Shane Williamson	(Japan)	7	o	1:12.71	
21	Tommi Pulli	(Finland)	10	i	1:12.82	
22	Dmitry Viskovsky	(Belarus)	4	o	1:12.84	
23	Luca Zanghellini	(Italy)	4	i	1:12.86	
24	Tsubasa Hasegawa	(Japan)	5	i	1:12.92	
25	Koto Nakao	(Japan)	3	i	1:13.21	
26	Juho Vaittinen	(Finland)	6	o	1:13.42	
27	David Bosa	(Italy)	11	o	1:13.46	
28	Christian Oberbichler	(Switzerland)	5	o	1:13.55	
29	Kim Jun-ho	(South Korea)	7	i	1:14.16	
30	Yevgeny Kazimirenko	(Belarus)	2	i	1:15.27	
31	Roman Krech	(Kazakhstan)	16	i	DQ	
32	Aleksandr Zhigin	(Kazakhstan)	8	o	DNS	
