= 2014–15 ISU Speed Skating World Cup – World Cup 6 – Men's 500 metres =

The men's 500 metres races of the 2014–15 ISU Speed Skating World Cup 6, arranged in the Thialf arena in Heerenveen, Netherlands, were held on the weekend of 7–8 February 2015.

Race one was won by Pavel Kulizhnikov of Russia, while Artur Waś of Poland came second, and Nico Ihle of Germany came third. Alex Boisvert-Lacroix of Canada won Division B of race one, and was thus, under the rules, automatically promoted to Division A for race two.

Kulizhnikov also won race two, while Mo Tae-bum of South Korea came second, and Nico Ihle of Germany came third. Keiichiro Nagashima of Japan won Division B of race two.

== Race 1 ==
Race one took place on Saturday, 7 February, with Division B scheduled in the morning session, at 11:35, and Division A scheduled in the afternoon session, at 15:53.

=== Division A ===
Rank	Name	Nat.	Pair	Lane	Time	WC points	GWC points
1st place, gold medalist(s)	Pavel Kulizhnikov	(Russia)	10	i	34.93	100	50
2nd place, silver medalist(s)	Artur Waś	(Poland)	8	i	34.97	80	40
3rd place, bronze medalist(s)	Nico Ihle	(Germany)	8	o	35.11	70	35
4	Michel Mulder	(Netherlands)	4	i	35.15	60	30
5	Ruslan Murashov	(Russia)	7	o	35.20	50	25
6	Laurent Dubreuil	(Canada)	10	o	35.216	45	—
7	Hein Otterspeer	(Netherlands)	6	o	35.218	40	
8	Mo Tae-bum	(South Korea)	9	o	35.23	36	
9	Jesper Hospes	(Netherlands)	1	i	35.27	32	
10	Pim Schipper	(Netherlands)	3	o	35.28	28	
11	Espen Aarnes Hvammen	(Norway)	7	i	35.31	24	
12	Aleksey Yesin	(Russia)	4	o	35.330	21	
13	Mika Poutala	(Finland)	3	i	35.339	18	
14	Roman Krech	(Kazakhstan)	1	o	35.34	16	
15	Gilmore Junio	(Canada)	5	i	35.43	14	
16	Yūya Oikawa	(Japan)	2	i	35.44	12	
17	Jan Smeekens	(Netherlands)	9	i	35.49	10	
18	Ryohei Haga	(Japan)	6	i	35.53	8	
19	Kim Jun-ho	(South Korea)	5	o	35.72	6	
20	Artur Nogal	(Poland)	2	o	36.35	5	

=== Division B ===
Rank	Name	Nat.	Pair	Lane	Time	WC points
1	Alex Boisvert-Lacroix	(Canada)	5	o	35.37	25
2	Jamie Gregg	(Canada)	5	i	35.57	19
3	Mitchell Whitmore	(United States)	16	o	35.61	15
4	Mu Zhongsheng	(China)	18	i	35.72	11
5	Tsubasa Hasegawa	(Japan)	16	i	35.73	8
6	Samuel Schwarz	(Germany)	17	o	35.74	6
7	Piotr Michalski	(Poland)	14	o	35.773	4
8	Pekka Koskela	(Finland)	12	i	35.778	2
9	Jonathan Garcia	(United States)	13	o	35.780	1
10	Mirko Giacomo Nenzi	(Italy)	19	o	35.783	—
11	Wang Nan	(China)	15	i	35.893	
12	Xie Jiaxuan	(China)	17	i	35.899	
13	David Bosa	(Italy)	15	o	35.91	
14	Denny Ihle	(Germany)	18	o	35.94	
15	Denis Kuzin	(Kazakhstan)	9	i	36.01	
16	Håvard Holmefjord Lorentzen	(Norway)	13	i	36.02	
17	Luca Zanghellini	(Italy)	8	i	36.14	
18	Denis Yuskov	(Russia)	2	i	36.19	
19	Kirill Golubev	(Russia)	12	o	36.23	
20	Christian Oberbichler	(Switzerland)	14	i	36.25	
21	Keiichiro Nagashima	(Japan)	19	i	36.31	
22	Joey Mantia	(United States)	4	o	36.34	
23	Shunsuke Nakamura	(Japan)	7	i	36.36	
24	Yang Fan	(China)	3	i	36.39	
25	Kimani Griffin	(United States)	9	o	36.46	
26	Denis Dressel	(Germany)	11	o	36.62	
27	Aleksandr Zhigin	(Kazakhstan)	8	o	36.65	
28	Vincent De Haître	(Canada)	11	i	36.69	
29	Armin Hager	(Austria)	6	o	36.72	
30	Daniel Greig	(Australia)	4	i	36.764	
31	Tommi Pulli	(Finland)	6	i	36.765	
32	Johann Jørgen Sæves	(Norway)	3	o	36.87	
33	Juho Vaittinen	(Finland)	10	i	36.89	
34	Yevgeny Kazimirenko	(Belarus)	7	o	37.21	
35	Dmitry Viskovsky	(Belarus)	2	o	37.49	
36	Maksim Baklashkin	(Kazakhstan)	1	i	38.17	
37	Christoffer Fagerli Rukke	(Norway)	10	o	DQ	

== Race 2 ==
Race two took place on Sunday, 8 February, with Division B scheduled in the morning session, at 11:35, and Division A scheduled in the afternoon session, at 15:42.

=== Division A ===
Rank	Name	Nat.	Pair	Lane	Time	WC points	GWC points
1st place, gold medalist(s)	Pavel Kulizhnikov	(Russia)	11	o	34.62	100	50
2nd place, silver medalist(s)	Mo Tae-bum	(South Korea)	8	i	34.94	80	40
3rd place, bronze medalist(s)	Nico Ihle	(Germany)	11	i	35.06	70	35
4	Ruslan Murashov	(Russia)	10	i	35.12	60	30
5	Michel Mulder	(Netherlands)	9	o	35.14	50	25
6	Laurent Dubreuil	(Canada)	9	i	35.152	45	—
6	Roman Krech	(Kazakhstan)	5	i	35.152	45	
8	Jamie Gregg	(Canada)	2	o	35.16	36	
9	Artur Waś	(Poland)	10	o	35.25	32	
10	Espen Aarnes Hvammen	(Norway)	7	o	35.27	28	
11	Aleksey Yesin	(Russia)	6	i	35.30	24	
12	Gilmore Junio	(Canada)	5	o	35.32	21	
13	Pim Schipper	(Netherlands)	7	i	35.36	18	
14	Jesper Hospes	(Netherlands)	8	o	35.38	16	
15	Alex Boisvert-Lacroix	(Canada)	4	i	35.45	14	
16	Mika Poutala	(Finland)	6	o	35.56	12	
17	Ryohei Haga	(Japan)	3	o	35.646	10	
18	Artur Nogal	(Poland)	2	i	35.649	8	
19	Kim Jun-ho	(South Korea)	3	i	35.65	6	
20	Yūya Oikawa	(Japan)	4	o	35.67	5	
21	Mu Zhongsheng	(China)	1	o	35.89	4	

=== Division B ===
Rank	Name	Nat.	Pair	Lane	Time	WC points
1	Keiichiro Nagashima	(Japan)	7	o	35.67	25
2	Xie Jiaxuan	(China)	11	o	35.74	19
3	Mirko Giacomo Nenzi	(Italy)	13	i	35.77	15
4	Pekka Koskela	(Finland)	13	o	35.81	11
5	Håvard Holmefjord Lorentzen	(Norway)	10	o	35.83	8
6	Tyler Derraugh	(Canada)	2	o	35.865	6
7	Tsubasa Hasegawa	(Japan)	14	o	35.868	4
8	Piotr Michalski	(Poland)	14	i	35.88	2
9	Denis Dressel	(Germany)	7	i	36.05	1
10	Yang Fan	(China)	5	o	36.15	—
11	Denny Ihle	(Germany)	11	i	36.26	
12	David Bosa	(Italy)	12	i	36.348	
13	Luca Zanghellini	(Italy)	9	o	36.349	
14	Christian Oberbichler	(Switzerland)	8	o	36.35	
15	Kirill Golubev	(Russia)	10	i	36.39	
16	Johann Jørgen Sæves	(Norway)	4	i	36.49	
17	Christoffer Fagerli Rukke	(Norway)	1	i	36.50	
18	Joey Mantia	(United States)	9	i	36.51	
19	Kim Jin-su	(South Korea)	1	o	36.524	
20	Juho Vaittinen	(Finland)	3	o	36.525	
21	Shunsuke Nakamura	(Japan)	6	o	36.54	
22	Tommi Pulli	(Finland)	4	o	36.77	
23	Kimani Griffin	(United States)	8	i	36.81	
24	Aleksandr Zhigin	(Kazakhstan)	6	i	36.84	
25	Armin Hager	(Austria)	5	i	36.96	
26	Dmitry Viskovsky	(Belarus)	2	i	37.28	
27	Yevgeny Kazimirenko	(Belarus)	3	i	37.29	
28	Wang Nan	(China)	12	o	DQ	
