= 2014–15 ISU Speed Skating World Cup – World Cup 6 – Women's 500 metres =

The women's 500 metres races of the 2014–15 ISU Speed Skating World Cup 6, arranged in the Thialf arena in Heerenveen, Netherlands, were held on the weekend of 7–8 February 2015.

Race one was won by Heather Richardson of the United States, while Nao Kodaira of Japan came second, and Brittany Bowe of the United States came third. Yvonne Daldossi of Italy won Division B of race one, and was thus, under the rules, automatically promoted to Division A for race two.

Race two was won by Judith Hesse of Germany, while Lee Sang-hwa of South Korea came second, and Thijsje Oenema of the Netherlands came third. Li Huawei of China won Division B of race two.

== Race 1 ==
Race one took place on Saturday, 7 February, with Division B scheduled in the morning session, at 10:45, and Division A scheduled in the afternoon session, at 15:30.

=== Division A ===
Rank	Name	Nat.	Pair	Lane	Time	WC points	GWC points
1st place, gold medalist(s)	Heather Richardson	(United States)	8	i	37.82	100	50
2nd place, silver medalist(s)	Nao Kodaira	(Japan)	10	o	38.14	80	40
3rd place, bronze medalist(s)	Brittany Bowe	(United States)	5	o	38.21	70	35
4	Vanessa Bittner	(Austria)	6	o	38.26	60	30
5	Lee Sang-hwa	(South Korea)	10	i	38.29	50	25
6	Karolína Erbanová	(Czech Republic)	7	i	38.34	45	—
7	Olga Fatkulina	(Russia)	7	o	38.45	40	
8	Judith Hesse	(Germany)	9	i	38.48	36	
9	Thijsje Oenema	(Netherlands)	6	i	38.49	32	
10	Floor van den Brandt	(Netherlands)	8	o	38.54	28	
11	Margot Boer	(Netherlands)	9	o	38.64	24	
12	Maki Tsuji	(Japan)	5	i	38.82	21	
13	Yekaterina Aydova	(Kazakhstan)	4	o	38.88	18	
14	Li Qishi	(China)	3	i	38.98	16	
15	Nadezhda Aseyeva	(Russia)	3	o	38.99	14	
16	Miyako Sumiyoshi	(Japan)	4	i	39.27	12	
17	Marsha Hudey	(Canada)	1	o	39.46	10	
18	Yuliya Kozyreva	(Russia)	1	i	39.67	8	
19	Arisa Go	(Japan)	2	o	39.75	6	
20	Park Seung-hi	(South Korea)	2	i	39.81	5	

=== Division B ===
Rank	Name	Nat.	Pair	Lane	Time	WC points
1	Yvonne Daldossi	(Italy)	11	i	39.06	25
2	Janine Smit	(Netherlands)	4	i	39.12	19
3	Laurine van Riessen	(Netherlands)	5	i	39.23	15
4	Li Huawei	(China)	11	i	39.47	11
5	Sugar Todd	(United States)	9	i	39.67	8
6	Heather McLean	(Canada)	12	o	39.73	6
7	Jessica Gregg	(Canada)	5	o	39.79	4
8	Zhang Xin	(China)	7	o	39.80	2
9	Sha Yuning	(China)	9	o	39.86	1
10	Lee Bo-ra	(South Korea)	12	i	40.06	—
11	Elina Risku	(Finland)	7	i	40.14	
12	Alexandra Ianculescu	(Canada)	10	o	40.16	
13	Ksenia Sadovskaya	(Belarus)	6	o	40.30	
14	Gabriele Hirschbichler	(Germany)	10	i	40.37	
15	Hege Bøkko	(Norway)	8	i	40.38	
16	Kelly Gunther	(United States)	4	o	40.46	
17	Zhao Xin	(China)	2	i	40.48	
18	Irina Arshinova	(Russia)	3	o	40.56	
19	Luiza Złotkowska	(Poland)	2	o	40.62	
20	Tatyana Mikhailova	(Belarus)	6	i	40.65	
21	Ida Njåtun	(Norway)	3	i	40.71	
22	Tamara Oudenaarden	(Canada)	8	o	41.12	
23	Linda Bortolotti	(Italy)	1	i	41.19	

== Race 2 ==
Race two took place on Sunday, 8 February, with Division B scheduled in the morning session, at 10:21, and Division A scheduled in the afternoon session, at 15:00.

=== Division A ===
Rank	Name	Nat.	Pair	Lane	Time	WC points	GWC points
1st place, gold medalist(s)	Judith Hesse	(Germany)	9	o	38.19	100	50
2nd place, silver medalist(s)	Lee Sang-hwa	(South Korea)	11	o	38.21	80	40
3rd place, bronze medalist(s)	Thijsje Oenema	(Netherlands)	8	o	38.23	70	35
4	Karolína Erbanová	(Czech Republic)	10	o	38.24	60	30
5	Yekaterina Aydova	(Kazakhstan)	6	i	38.53	50	25
6	Margot Boer	(Netherlands)	7	i	38.54	45	—
7	Nao Kodaira	(Japan)	11	i	38.56	40	
8	Floor van den Brandt	(Netherlands)	8	i	38.57	36	
9	Maki Tsuji	(Japan)	7	o	38.67	32	
10	Vanessa Bittner	(Austria)	10	i	38.74	28	
11	Laurine van Riessen	(Netherlands)	3	o	38.83	24	
12	Yvonne Daldossi	(Italy)	5	o	38.93	21	
13	Olga Fatkulina	(Russia)	9	i	38.96	18	
14	Li Qishi	(China)	6	o	38.99	16	
15	Janine Smit	(Netherlands)	4	o	39.12	14	
16	Marsha Hudey	(Canada)	4	i	39.19	12	
17	Miyako Sumiyoshi	(Japan)	2	o	39.43	10	
18	Yuliya Kozyreva	(Russia)	2	i	39.56	8	
19	Nadezhda Aseyeva	(Russia)	5	i	39.65	6	
20	Arisa Go	(Japan)	3	i	39.79	5	
21	Park Seung-hi	(South Korea)	1	o	40.52	4	

=== Division B ===
Rank	Name	Nat.	Pair	Lane	Time	WC points
1	Li Huawei	(China)	9	o	39.47	25
2	Sugar Todd	(United States)	8	o	39.64	19
3	Heather McLean	(Canada)	9	i	39.77	15
4	Zhang Xin	(China)	7	i	39.79	11
5	Jessica Gregg	(Canada)	8	i	39.87	8
6	Sha Yuning	(China)	6	i	39.89	6
7	Kali Christ	(Canada)	1	i	39.92	4
8	Elina Risku	(Finland)	6	o	39.97	2
9	Lee Bo-ra	(South Korea)	7	o	39.98	1
10	Irina Arshinova	(Russia)	3	i	40.09	—
11	Tamara Oudenaarden	(Canada)	2	i	40.18	
12	Zhao Xin	(China)	3	o	40.23	
13	Gabriele Hirschbichler	(Germany)	5	o	40.25	
14	Hege Bøkko	(Norway)	4	o	40.35	
15	Kelly Gunther	(United States)	4	i	40.38	
16	Ksenia Sadovskaya	(Belarus)	5	i	40.45	
17	Tatyana Mikhailova	(Belarus)	2	o	40.72	
18	Linda Bortolotti	(Italy)	2	o	41.49	
