= 2014–15 ISU Speed Skating World Cup – World Cup 5 – Men's 1500 metres =

The men's 1500 metres race of the 2014–15 ISU Speed Skating World Cup 5, arranged in the Vikingskipet arena in Hamar, Norway, was held on 1 February 2015.

Denis Yuskov of Russia won, followed by Kjeld Nuis of the Netherlands in second place, and Denny Morrison of Canada in third place. Danil Sinitsyn of Russia won Division B.

== Results ==
The race took place on Saturday, 1 February, with Division B scheduled in the morning session, at 10:40, and Division A scheduled in the afternoon session, at 14:19.

=== Division A ===
Rank	Name	Nat.	Pair	Lane	Time	WC points	GWC points
1st place, gold medalist(s)	Denis Yuskov	(Russia)	2	o	1:45.07	100	100
2nd place, silver medalist(s)	Kjeld Nuis	(Netherlands)	10	o	1:45.80	80	80
3rd place, bronze medalist(s)	Denny Morrison	(Canada)	8	o	1:46.03	70	70
4	Thomas Krol	(Netherlands)	6	i	1:46.59	60	60
5	Haralds Silovs	(Latvia)	4	i	1:46.60	50	50
6	Sverre Lunde Pedersen	(Norway)	9	i	1:46.64	45	—
7	Shani Davis	(United States)	8	i	1:46.80	40	
8	Zbigniew Bródka	(Poland)	6	o	1:46.84	36	
9	Konrad Niedźwiedzki	(Poland)	7	i	1:46.95	32	
10	Li Bailin	(China)	5	o	1:47.55	28	
11	Joey Mantia	(United States)	1	i	1:47.61	24	
12	Wouter olde Heuvel	(Netherlands)	9	o	1:47.72	21	
13	Sergey Gryaztsov	(Russia)	4	o	1:47.89	18	
14	Håvard Bøkko	(Norway)	1	o	1:47.97	16	
15	Bart Swings	(Belgium)	7	o	1:48.03	14	
16	Håvard Holmefjord Lorentzen	(Norway)	3	i	1:48.44	12	
17	Lee Seung-hoon	(South Korea)	5	i	1:49.44	10	
18	Alec Janssens	(Canada)	2	i	1:50.01	8	
19	Mikhail Kozlov	(Russia)	3	o	1:50.87	6	
20	Jan Szymański	(Poland)	10	i	DQ		

=== Division B ===
Rank	Name	Nat.	Pair	Lane	Time	WC points
1	Danil Sinitsyn	(Russia)	19	i	1:47.65	25
2	Douwe de Vries	(Netherlands)	9	o	1:47.67	19
3	Alexis Contin	(France)	20	i	1:48.18	15
4	Denis Kuzin	(Kazakhstan)	22	i	1:48.97	11
5	Ted-Jan Bloemen	(Canada)	20	o	1:49.19	8
6	Piotr Puszkarski	(Poland)	6	i	1:49.21	6
7	Aleksey Suvorov	(Russia)	23	i	1:49.32	4
8	Konrád Nagy	(Hungary)	21	o	1:49.33	2
9	Simen Spieler Nilsen	(Norway)	8	i	1:49.35	1
10	Kim Cheol-min	(South Korea)	18	i	1:49.61	—
11	Armin Hager	(Austria)	18	o	1:49.79	
12	Benjamin Macé	(France)	21	i	1:49.89	
13	Liu Yiming	(China)	19	o	1:49.90	
14	Bram Smallenbroek	(Austria)	23	o	1:49.95	
15	Seitaro Ichinohe	(Japan)	8	o	1:50.17	
16	Jorrit Bergsma	(Netherlands)	7	i	1:50.22	
17	Andrea Giovannini	(Italy)	14	i	1:50.26	
18	Patrick Beckert	(Germany)	10	o	1:50.40	
19	Jonathan Garcia	(United States)	16	o	1:50.46	
20	Shane Williamson	(Japan)	17	i	1:50.52	
21	K. C. Boutiette	(United States)	5	o	1:50.80	
22	Fredrik van der Horst	(Norway)	7	o	1:50.85	
23	Maksim Baklashkin	(Kazakhstan)	15	o	1:50.86	
24	Stefan Waples	(Canada)	9	i	1:51.02	
25	Vitaly Mikhailov	(Belarus)	15	i	1:51.11	
26	Tomoya Watanabe	(Japan)	5	i	1:51.24	
27	Jeffrey Swider-Peltz	(United States)	22	o	1:51.37	
28	Rehanbai Talabuhan	(China)	4	i	1:51.47	
29	Jonas Pflug	(Germany)	13	o	1:51.48	
30	Andrea Stefani	(Italy)	4	o	1:51.68	
31	Ko Byung-wook	(South Korea)	2	o	1:51.87	
32	Aleksandr Zhigin	(Kazakhstan)	13	i	1:52.08	
33	Livio Wenger	(Switzerland)	2	i	1:52.20	
34	Linus Heidegger	(Austria)	12	o	1:52.37	
35	Luca Stefani	(Italy)	17	o	1:52.44	
36	Alexej Baumgärtner	(Germany)	14	o	1:52.52	
37	Jordan Belchos	(Canada)	6	o	1:53.115	
38	Marco Weber	(Germany)	3	i	1:53.116	
39	Nicola Tumolero	(Italy)	10	i	1:53.66	
40	Iñigo Vidondo	(Spain)	3	o	1:53.92	
41	Stefan Due Schmidt	(Denmark)	11	o	1:53.94	
42	Viktor Hald Thorup	(Denmark)	12	i	1:54.04	
43	Reyon Kay	(New Zealand)	11	i	1:54.08	
44	Nils van der Poel	(Sweden)	16	i	1:54.71	
45	Martin Hänggi	(Switzerland)	1	i	1:57.28	
