= 2014–15 ISU Speed Skating World Cup – World Cup 3 – Men's 1000 metres =

The men's 1000 metres race of the 2014–15 ISU Speed Skating World Cup 3, arranged in Sportforum Hohenschönhausen, in Berlin, Germany, was held on 6 December 2014.

Nico Ihle of Germany won, followed by Samuel Schwarz of Germany in second place, and Hein Otterspeer of the Netherlands in third place. Jonathan Garcia of the United States won Division B.

== Results ==
The race took place on Saturday, 6 December, with Division B scheduled in the morning session, at 10:29, and Division A scheduled in the afternoon session, at 13:45.

=== Division A ===
Rank	Name	Nat.	Pair	Lane	Time	WC points	GWC points
1st place, gold medalist(s)	Nico Ihle	(Germany)	6	i	1:09.49	100	100
2nd place, silver medalist(s)	Samuel Schwarz	(Germany)	9	i	1:09.53	80	80
3rd place, bronze medalist(s)	Hein Otterspeer	(Netherlands)	5	i	1:09.56	70	70
4	Aleksey Yesin	(Russia)	3	i	1:09.83	60	60
5	Pavel Kulizhnikov	(Russia)	10	i	1:09.86	50	50
6	Stefan Groothuis	(Netherlands)	9	o	1:09.90	45	—
7	Håvard Holmefjord Lorentzen	(Norway)	3	o	1:10.06	40	
8	Denny Morrison	(Canada)	4	i	1:10.09	36	
9	Konrad Niedźwiedzki	(Poland)	4	o	1:10.144	32	
10	Kai Verbij	(Netherlands)	7	i	1:10.147	28	
11	Shani Davis	(United States)	8	i	1:10.21	24	
12	Kjeld Nuis	(Netherlands)	10	o	1:10.25	21	
13	Koen Verweij	(Netherlands)	8	o	1:10.28	18	
14	Kirill Golubev	(Russia)	2	i	1:10.45	16	
15	Vincent De Haître	(Canada)	7	o	1:10.494	14	
16	Mo Tae-bum	(South Korea)	1	i	1:10.497	12	
17	Richard Maclennan	(Canada)	5	o	1:10.59	10	
18	Yang Fan	(China)	6	o	1:10.64	8	
19	Kim Jin-su	(South Korea)	2	o	1:10.88	6	

=== Division B ===
Rank	Name	Nat.	Pair	Lane	Time	WC points
1	Jonathan Garcia	(United States)	5	i	1:10.48	25
2	Piotr Michalski	(Poland)	7	i	1:10.81	19
3	Joey Mantia	(United States)	6	o	1:10.83	15
4	Mika Poutala	(Finland)	5	o	1:10.85	11
5	Mirko Giacomo Nenzi	(Italy)	12	i	1:10.89	8
6	David Bosa	(Italy)	7	o	1:11.16	6
7	Benjamin Macé	(France)	11	i	1:11.25	4
8	Denis Dressel	(Germany)	13	o	1:11.31	2
9	Christoffer Fagerli Rukke	(Norway)	4	i	1:11.35	1
10	Hubert Hirschbichler	(Germany)	2	i	1:11.43	—
11	Tyler Derraugh	(Canada)	13	i	1:11.44	
12	Kimani Griffin	(United States)	3	o	1:11.49	
13	Tommi Pulli	(Finland)	2	o	1:11.51	
14	Bram Smallenbroek	(Austria)	9	o	1:11.54	
15	Mikhail Kozlov	(Russia)	10	i	1:11.60	
16	Kim Jun-ho	(South Korea)	10	o	1:11.80	
17	Shunsuke Nakamura	(Japan)	11	o	1:11.83	
18	Li Bailin	(China)	14	o	1:11.93	
19	Konrád Nagy	(Hungary)	8	i	1:12.12	
20	Ha Hong-sun	(South Korea)	14	i	1:12.27	
21	Denny Ihle	(Germany)	3	i	1:12.29	
22	Aleksandr Zhigin	(Kazakhstan)	8	o	1:12.36	
23	Yuto Fujino	(Japan)	9	i	1:12.48	
24	David Andersson	(Sweden)	4	o	1:12.99	
25	Ryohei Haga	(Japan)	1	i	1:13.03	
26	Juho Vaittinen	(Finland)	1	o	1:13.37	
27	Armin Hager	(Austria)	12	o	1:14.27	
28	Mitchell Whitmore	(United States)	6	i	DQ	
