= 2014–15 ISU Speed Skating World Cup – World Cup 5 – Men's mass start =

The men's mass start race of the 2014–15 ISU Speed Skating World Cup 5, arranged in the Vikingskipet arena in Hamar, Norway, was held on 1 February 2015.

Lee Seung-hoon of South Korea won the race, while Marco Weber of Germany came second, and Bart Swings of Belgium came third. With his win, Lee extended his lead in the mass start cup to 164 points, thus securing the title, as only 150 points are available for the winner in the last competition weekend in Erfurt, Germany.

== Results ==
The race took place on Sunday, 1 February, scheduled in the afternoon session, at 15:31.

				Race points							
Rank	Name	Nat.	Laps	Split 1	Split 2	Split 3	Finish	Total	Time	WC points	GWC points
1st place, gold medalist(s)	Lee Seung-hoon	(South Korea)	16				60	60	7:50.52	100	100
2nd place, silver medalist(s)	Marco Weber	(Germany)	16				40	40	7:50.82	80	80
3rd place, bronze medalist(s)	Bart Swings	(Belgium)	16		5		20	25	7:50.87	70	70
4	Andrea Giovannini	(Italy)	16	3		5		8	8:08.07	60	60
5	Armin Hager	(Austria)	16	5				5	8:04.29	50	50
6	Sverre Lunde Pedersen	(Norway)	16		3	1		4	7:57.12	45	—
7	Sun Longjiang	(China)	16			3		3	8:28.88	40	
8	Linus Heidegger	(Austria)	16		1			1	7:53.77	36	
9	Shane Williamson	(Japan)	16	1				1	7:56.01	32	
10	Alexis Contin	(France)	16					0	7:50.91	28	
11	Robert Watson	(Canada)	16					0	7:51.14	24	
12	Kim Cheol-min	(South Korea)	16					0	7:51.21	21	
13	Haralds Silovs	(Latvia)	16					0	7:51.22	18	
14	Jeffrey Swider-Peltz	(United States)	16					0	7:52.41	16	
15	Reyon Kay	(New Zealand)	16					0	7:54.81	14	
16	Nicola Tumolero	(Italy)	16					0	7:55.26	12	
17	Alexej Baumgärtner	(Germany)	16					0	7:55.50	10	
18	Yevgeny Seryaev	(Russia)	16					0	7:57.17	8	
19	Viktor Hald Thorup	(Denmark)	16					0	7:57.49	6	
20	Stefan Waples	(Canada)	16					0	7:57.65	5	
21	Konrád Nagy	(Hungary)	16					0	7:57.96	4	
22	Martin Hänggi	(Switzerland)	16					0	8:11.49	3	
23	Iñigo Vidondo	(Spain)	16					0	8:24.81	2	
24	Joshua Capponi	(Australia)	16					0	8:29.40	1	
25	Roland Cieslak	(Poland)	14					0	7:24.86	—	
26	Jorrit Bergsma	(Netherlands)	14					0	7:28.22		
27	Arjan Stroetinga	(Netherlands)	14					0	7:48.95		
