= 2014–15 ISU Speed Skating World Cup – World Cup 3 – Women's 1500 metres =

The women's 1500 metres race of the 2014–15 ISU Speed Skating World Cup 3, arranged in Sportforum Hohenschönhausen, in Berlin, Germany, was held on 7 December 2014.

Ireen Wüst of the Netherlands won, followed by Heather Richardson of the United States in second place, and Marrit Leenstra of the Netherlands in third place. Antoinette de Jong of the Netherlands won Division B.

== Results ==
The race took place on Sunday, 7 December, with Division B scheduled in the morning session, at 10:05, and Division A scheduled in the afternoon session, at 12:50.

=== Division A ===
Rank	Name	Nat.	Pair	Lane	Time	WC points	GWC points
1st place, gold medalist(s)	Ireen Wüst	(Netherlands)	10	o	1:55.89	100	100
2nd place, silver medalist(s)	Heather Richardson	(United States)	1	o	1:55.91	80	80
3rd place, bronze medalist(s)	Marrit Leenstra	(Netherlands)	10	i	1:55.93	70	70
4	Brittany Bowe	(United States)	1	i	1:56.12	60	60
5	Marije Joling	(Netherlands)	7	i	1:57.78	50	50
6	Olga Graf	(Russia)	8	i	1:57.97	45	—
7	Martina Sáblíková	(Czech Republic)	6	i	1:58.22	40	
8	Ida Njåtun	(Norway)	9	i	1:58.35	36	
9	Luiza Złotkowska	(Poland)	6	o	1:58.79	32	
10	Nana Takagi	(Japan)	5	i	1:58.98	28	
11	Yuliya Skokova	(Russia)	9	o	1:59.08	24	
12	Linda de Vries	(Netherlands)	8	o	1:59.25	21	
13	Li Qishi	(China)	7	o	1:59.55	18	
14	Kali Christ	(Canada)	5	o	1:59.78	16	
15	Gabriele Hirschbichler	(Germany)	3	i	2:00.42	14	
16	Ayaka Kikuchi	(Japan)	4	i	2:00.84	12	
17	Karolína Erbanová	(Czech Republic)	2	o	2:00.87	10	
18	Zhao Xin	(China)	4	o	2:01.11	8	
19	Noh Seon-yeong	(South Korea)	3	o	2:02.30	6	
20	Kim Bo-reum	(South Korea)	2	i	2:03.24	5	

=== Division B ===
Rank	Name	Nat.	Pair	Lane	Time	WC points
1	Antoinette de Jong	(Netherlands)	4	i	2:00.58	25
2	Hege Bøkko	(Norway)	4	o	2:01.68	19
3	Isabell Ost	(Germany)	3	i	2:01.81	15
4	Katarzyna Wożniak	(Poland)	12	o	2:01.88	11
5	Maki Tabata	(Japan)	5	o	2:02.04	8
6	Margarita Ryzhova	(Russia)	11	i	2:02.29	6
7	Roxanne Dufter	(Germany)	3	o	2:02.36	4
8	Liu Jing	(China)	10	o	2:02.42	2
9	Marina Zueva	(Belarus)	2	o	2:02.53	1
10	Misaki Oshigiri	(Japan)	12	i	2:02.86	—
11	Jennifer Bay	(Germany)	2	i	2:03.213	
12	Francesca Lollobrigida	(Italy)	6	i	2:03.216	
13	Jelena Peeters	(Belgium)	11	o	2:03.30	
14	Anna Chernova	(Russia)	9	o	2:03.36	
15	Josie Spence	(Canada)	7	i	2:03.54	
16	Park Cho-weon	(South Korea)	10	i	2:03.79	
17	Aleksandra Kachurkina	(Russia)	8	i	2:04.94	
18	Natálie Kerschbaummayr	(Czech Republic)	5	i	2:05.23	
19	Lauren McGuire	(China)	6	o	2:05.92	
20	Kate Hanly	(Canada)	7	o	2:06.03	
21	Saskia Alusalu	(Estonia)	1	i	2:06.81	
22	Aleksandra Goss	(Poland)	9	i	2:06.94	
23	Saori Toi	(Japan)	8	o	2:16.36	
