= 2014–15 ISU Speed Skating World Cup – World Cup 6 =

The sixth competition weekend of the 2014–15 ISU Speed Skating World Cup was held in the Thialf arena in Heerenveen, Netherlands, from Saturday, 7 February, until Sunday, 8 February 2015.

== Schedule ==
The detailed schedule of events:

Date	Session	Events	Comment
Saturday, 7 February	Morning	10:45: 500 m women (1); 11:35: 500 m men (1); 12:51: 1000 m women (1); 13:11: 1000 m men (1)	Division B
Saturday, 7 February	Afternoon	15:30: 500 m women (1); 15:53: 500 m men (1); 16:33: 1000 m women (1); 17:19: 1000 m men (1)	Division A
Sunday, 8 February	Morning	10:21: 500 m women (2); 11:35: 500 m men (2); 12:25: 1000 m women (2); 13:11: 1000 m men (2)	Division B
Sunday, 8 February	Afternoon	15:00: 500 m women (2); 15:42: 500 m men (2); 16:24: 1000 m women (2); 17:13: 1000 m men (2)	Division A

All times are CET (UTC+1).

== Medal summary ==
=== Men's events ===
Event	Race #	Gold	Time	Silver	Time	Bronze	Time	Report
500 m	1	Pavel Kulizhnikov; Russia	34.93	Artur Waś; Poland	34.97	Nico Ihle; Germany	35.11	
500 m	2	Pavel Kulizhnikov; Russia	34.62	Mo Tae-bum; South Korea	34.94	Nico Ihle; Germany	35.06	
1000 m	1	Kjeld Nuis; Netherlands	1:08.76	Pavel Kulizhnikov; Russia	1:08.97	Nico Ihle; Germany	1:09.06	
1000 m	2	Kjeld Nuis; Netherlands	1:08.81	Pavel Kulizhnikov; Russia	1:08.82	Stefan Groothuis; Netherlands	1:09.38	

=== Women's events ===
Event	Race #	Gold	Time	Silver	Time	Bronze	Time	Report
500 m	1	Heather Richardson; United States	37.82	Nao Kodaira; Japan	38.14	Brittany Bowe; United States	38.21	
500 m	2	Judith Hesse; Germany	38.19	Lee Sang-hwa; South Korea	38.21	Thijsje Oenema; Netherlands	38.23	
1000 m	1	Heather Richardson; United States	1:14.87	Brittany Bowe; United States	1:15.38	Li Qishi; China	1:15.89	
1000 m	2	Brittany Bowe; United States	1:15.63	Marrit Leenstra; Netherlands	1:15.75	Karolína Erbanová; Czech Republic	1:15.98	
