= 2014–15 ISU Speed Skating World Cup – World Cup 4 – Women's 1500 metres =

The women's 1500 metres race of the 2014–15 ISU Speed Skating World Cup 4, arranged in the Thialf arena in Heerenveen, Netherlands, was held on 14 December 2014.

Heather Richardson of the United States won, followed by Brittany Bowe of the United States in second place, and Marrit Leenstra of the Netherlands in third place. Ivanie Blondin of Canada won Division B.

== Results ==
The race took place on Sunday, 14 December, with Division B scheduled in the morning session, at 09:00, and Division A scheduled in the afternoon session, at 14:00.

=== Division A ===
Rank	Name	Nat.	Pair	Lane	Time	WC points	GWC points
1st place, gold medalist(s)	Heather Richardson	(United States)	7	o	1:53.87	100	100
2nd place, silver medalist(s)	Brittany Bowe	(United States)	6	o	1:54.70	80	80
3rd place, bronze medalist(s)	Marrit Leenstra	(Netherlands)	10	o	1:55.95	70	70
4	Ireen Wüst	(Netherlands)	10	i	1:56.01	60	60
5	Martina Sáblíková	(Czech Republic)	8	i	1:56.37	50	50
6	Linda de Vries	(Netherlands)	8	o	1:56.93	45	—
7	Ida Njåtun	(Norway)	9	i	1:57.40	40	
8	Antoinette de Jong	(Netherlands)	2	i	1:58.05	36	
9	Ayaka Kikuchi	(Japan)	5	o	1:58.18	32	
10	Kali Christ	(Canada)	5	i	1:58.37	28	
11	Olga Graf	(Russia)	9	o	1:59.13	24	
12	Luiza Złotkowska	(Poland)	7	i	1:59.29	21	
13	Nana Takagi	(Japan)	6	i	1:59.41	18	
14	Zhao Xin	(China)	4	i	2:00.19	16	
15	Katarzyna Woźniak	(Poland)	3	i	2:00.95	14	
16	Hege Bøkko	(Norway)	1	o	2:01.14	12	
17	Noh Seon-yeong	(South Korea)	4	o	2:01.38	10	
18	Kim Bo-reum	(South Korea)	3	o	2:01.43	8	
19	Margarita Ryzhova	(Russia)	2	o	2:01.83	6	
20	Isabell Ost	(Germany)	1	o	2:01.85	5	

=== Division B ===
Rank	Name	Nat.	Pair	Lane	Time	WC points
1	Ivanie Blondin	(Canada)	3	o	1:58.21	25
2	Sanneke de Neeling	(Netherlands)	4	o	2:01.64	19
3	Tatyana Mikhailova	(Belarus)	3	i	2:02.02	15
4	Maki Tabata	(Japan)	9	o	2:02.20	11
5	Jelena Peeters	(Belgium)	11	o	2:02.80	8
6	Olga Fatkulina	(Russia)	10	i	2:03.67	6
7	Saori Toi	(Japan)	7	i	2:03.87	4
8	Francesca Lollobrigida	(Italy)	6	i	2:04.05	2
9	Park Cho-weon	(South Korea)	9	i	2:04.42	1
10	Josie Spence	(Canada)	7	o	2:04.55	—
11	Roxanne Dufter	(Germany)	8	i	2:04.60	
12	Liu Jing	(China)	10	o	2:04.71	
13	Saskia Alusalu	(Estonia)	5	i	2:05.03	
14	Kate Hanly	(Canada)	6	o	2:05.34	
15	Zhang Xin	(China)	2	o	2:05.80	
16	Misaki Oshigiri	(Japan)	11	i	2:06.265	
17	Aleksandra Kachurkina	(Russia)	8	o	2:06.267	
18	Katerina Novotná	(Czech Republic)	1	i	2:07.71	
19	Jaclyn Rowe	(United States)	2	i	2:08.00	
20	Jun Ye-jin	(South Korea)	5	o	2:08.52	
21	Nikola Zdráhalová	(Czech Republic)	4	i	2:09.13	
