= 2014–15 ISU Speed Skating World Cup – World Cup 4 – Men's 1000 metres =

The men's 1000 metres race of the 2014–15 ISU Speed Skating World Cup 4, arranged in the Thialf arena in Heerenveen, Netherlands, was held on 13 December 2014.

Pavel Kulizhnikov of Russia won, followed by Kjeld Nuis of the Netherlands in second place, and Hein Otterspeer of the Netherlands in third place. Pim Schipper of the Netherlands won Division B.

== Results ==
The race took place on Saturday, 13 December, with Division B scheduled in the morning session, at 10:24, and Division A scheduled in the afternoon session, at 17:21.

=== Division A ===
Rank	Name	Nat.	Pair	Lane	Time	WC points	GWC points
1st place, gold medalist(s)	Pavel Kulizhnikov	(Russia)	10	i	1:08.77	100	100
2nd place, silver medalist(s)	Kjeld Nuis	(Netherlands)	9	i	1:09.04	80	80
3rd place, bronze medalist(s)	Hein Otterspeer	(Netherlands)	7	i	1:09.06	70	70
4	Aleksey Yesin	(Russia)	6	i	1:09.32	60	60
5	Samuel Schwarz	(Germany)	10	o	1:09.39	50	50
6	Denny Morrison	(Canada)	5	i	1:09.50	45	—
7	Denis Kuzin	(Kazakhstan)	2	i	1:09.522	40	
8	Shani Davis	(United States)	8	o	1:09.523	36	
9	Nico Ihle	(Germany)	9	o	1:09.526	32	
10	Jonathan Garcia	(United States)	2	o	1:09.59	28	
11	Stefan Groothuis	(Netherlands)	8	i	1:09.75	24	
12	Kai Verbij	(Netherlands)	7	o	1:09.83	21	
13	Vincent De Haître	(Canada)	6	o	1:09.87	18	
14	Richard Maclennan	(Canada)	3	i	1:09.95	16	
15	Konrad Niedźwiedzki	(Poland)	5	o	1:09.97	14	
16	Håvard Holmefjord Lorentzen	(Norway)	4	i	1:10.00	12	
17	Yang Fan	(China)	4	o	1:10.32	10	
18	Joey Mantia	(United States)	1	o	1:10.40	8	
19	Kirill Golubev	(Russia)	3	o	1:10.48	6	
20	Piotr Michalski	(Poland)	1	i	1:11.40	5	

=== Division B ===
Rank	Name	Nat.	Pair	Lane	Time	WC points
1	Pim Schipper	(Netherlands)	2	i	1:10.04	25
2	Mo Tae-bum	(South Korea)	15	o	1:10.19	19
3	Denis Dressel	(Germany)	12	o	1:10.873	15
4	Tyler Derraugh	(Canada)	12	i	1:10.878	11
5	Kim Jin-su	(South Korea)	15	i	1:10.89	8
6	Haralds Silovs	(Latvia)	3	o	1:10.93	6
7	Mika Poutala	(Finland)	13	o	1:11.033	4
8	Mitchell Whitmore	(United States)	3	i	1:11.034	2
9	Benjamin Macé	(France)	11	i	1:11.12	1
10	Mirko Giacomo Nenzi	(Italy)	13	i	1:11.15	—
11	Li Bailin	(China)	14	o	1:11.31	
12	Armin Hager	(Austria)	10	i	1:11.49	
13	Mikhail Kozlov	(Russia)	9	i	1:11.55	
14	Shunsuke Nakamura	(Japan)	10	o	1:11.70	
15	Bram Smallenbroek	(Austria)	7	i	1:11.74	
16	Ha Hong-sun	(South Korea)	14	i	1:11.75	
17	Christoffer Fagerli Rukke	(Norway)	9	o	1:11.78	
18	David Bosa	(Italy)	11	o	1:12.06	
19	Kimani Griffin	(United States)	8	i	1:12.10	
20	Aleksandr Zhigin	(Kazakhstan)	5	i	1:12.12	
21	Konrád Nagy	(Hungary)	6	o	1:12.38	
22	Yuto Fujino	(Japan)	6	i	1:12.56	
23	Kim Jun-ho	(South Korea)	7	o	1:12.78	
24	Aleksander Waagenes	(Norway)	2	o	1:12.83	
25	Ryohei Haga	(Japan)	4	i	1:13.07	
26	Juho Vaittinen	(Finland)	4	o	1:13.15	
27	David Andersson	(Sweden)	5	o	1:13.51	
28	Tommi Pulli	(Finland)	8	o	1:13.90	
29	Sebastian Klosinski	(Poland)	1	i	DQ	
