= 2014–15 ISU Speed Skating World Cup – World Cup 4 – Men's 1500 metres =

The men's 1500 metres race of the 2014–15 ISU Speed Skating World Cup 4, arranged in the Thialf arena in Heerenveen, Netherlands, was held on 14 December 2014.

Jan Szymański of Poland won, followed by Wouter olde Heuvel of the Netherlands in second place, and Shani Davis of the United States in third place. Joey Mantia of the United States won Division B.

== Results ==
The race took place on Sunday, 14 December, with Division B scheduled in the morning session, at 10:03, and Division A scheduled in the afternoon session, at 14:54.

=== Division A ===
Rank	Name	Nat.	Pair	Lane	Time	WC points	GWC points
1st place, gold medalist(s)	Jan Szymański	(Poland)	9	o	1:45.92	100	100
2nd place, silver medalist(s)	Wouter olde Heuvel	(Netherlands)	8	i	1:46.22	80	80
3rd place, bronze medalist(s)	Shani Davis	(United States)	8	o	1:46.33	70	70
4	Bart Swings	(Belgium)	6	i	1:46.55	60	60
5	Kjeld Nuis	(Netherlands)	10	o	1:46.65	50	50
6	Konrad Niedźwiedzki	(Poland)	7	o	1:46.70	45	—
7	Sven Kramer	(Netherlands)	6	o	1:46.79	40	
8	Zbigniew Bródka	(Poland)	5	i	1:47.06	36	
9	Sverre Lunde Pedersen	(Norway)	10	i	1:47.08	32	
10	Haralds Silovs	(Latvia)	1	o	1:47.84	28	
11	Denny Morrison	(Canada)	9	i	1:47.92	24	
12	Lee Seung-hoon	(South Korea)	4	i	1:48.07	21	
13	Thomas Krol	(Netherlands)	7	i	1:48.13	18	
14	Li Bailin	(China)	5	o	1:48.21	16	
15	Håvard Holmefjord Lorentzen	(Norway)	1	i	1:48.54	14	
16	Sergey Gryaztsov	(Russia)	3	i	1:48.66	12	
17	Kim Jin-su	(South Korea)	4	o	1:49.27	10	
18	Alec Janssens	(Canada)	2	o	1:49.498	8	
18	Kim Min-seok	(South Korea)	2	i	1:49.498	8	
20	Mikhail Kozlov	(Russia)	3	o	1:49.98	5	

=== Division B ===
Rank	Name	Nat.	Pair	Lane	Time	WC points
1	Joey Mantia	(United States)	11	o	1:47.95	25
2	Denis Yuskov	(Russia)	14	o	1:48.01	19
3	Håvard Bøkko	(Norway)	2	o	1:48.15	15
4	Alexis Contin	(France)	10	i	1:48.37	11
5	Danil Sinitsyn	(Russia)	1	i	1:48.70	8
6	Pim Schipper	(Netherlands)	12	i	1:48.74	6
7	Benjamin Macé	(France)	13	o	1:49.00	4
8	Ted-Jan Bloemen	(Canada)	12	o	1:49.17	2
9	Bram Smallenbroek	(Austria)	15	o	1:49.75	1
10	Mirko Giacomo Nenzi	(Italy)	8	o	1:49.94	—
11	Armin Hager	(Austria)	8	i	1:50.16	
12	Roland Cieslak	(Poland)	9	i	1:50.31	
13	Konrád Nagy	(Hungary)	13	i	1:50.33	
14	Nils van der Poel	(Sweden)	3	i	1:50.41	
15	Jeffrey Swider-Peltz	(United States)	14	i	1:50.48	
16	Kirill Golubev	(Russia)	11	i	1:50.49	
17	Luca Stefani	(Italy)	7	o	1:50.630	
18	Shane Williamson	(Japan)	7	i	1:50.633	
19	Vitaly Mikhailov	(Belarus)	5	o	1:50.704	
20	Denis Kuzin	(Kazakhstan)	15	i	1:50.707	
21	Liu Yiming	(China)	9	o	1:51.59	
22	Aleksander Waagenes	(Norway)	6	i	1:51.66	
23	Andrea Giovannini	(Italy)	5	i	1:51.79	
24	Vincent De Haître	(Canada)	10	o	1:51.90	
25	Edwin Park	(United States)	4	i	1:52.06	
26	Denis Dressel	(Germany)	6	o	1:52.32	
27	Aleksandr Zhigin	(Kazakhstan)	3	o	1:52.71	
28	Viktor Hald Thorup	(Denmark)	1	o	1:52.82	
29	Reyon Kay	(New Zealand)	2	i	1:55.19	
30	Daichi Yamanaka	(Japan)	4	o	1:55.37	
