= 2014–15 ISU Speed Skating World Cup – World Cup 4 – Women's 1000 metres =

The women's 1000 metres race of the 2014–15 ISU Speed Skating World Cup 4, arranged in the Thialf arena in Heerenveen, Netherlands, was held on 13 December 2014.

Heather Richardson of the United States won, followed by Brittany Bowe of the United States in second place, and Li Qishi of China in third place. Ayaka Kikuchi of Japan won Division B.

== Results ==
The race took place on Saturday, 13 December, with Division B scheduled in the morning session, at 09:30, and Division A scheduled in the afternoon session, at 14:00.

=== Division A ===
Rank	Name	Nat.	Pair	Lane	Time	WC points	GWC points
1st place, gold medalist(s)	Heather Richardson	(United States)	6	i	1:14.63	100	100
2nd place, silver medalist(s)	Brittany Bowe	(United States)	7	i	1:14.68	80	80
3rd place, bronze medalist(s)	Li Qishi	(China)	9	i	1:15.71	70	70
4	Ireen Wüst	(Netherlands)	8	o	1:15.75	60	60
5	Karolína Erbanová	(Czech Republic)	8	i	1:16.03	50	50
6	Judith Hesse	(Germany)	3	o	1:16.12	45	—
7	Olga Fatkulina	(Russia)	6	o	1:16.28	40	
8	Marrit Leenstra	(Netherlands)	9	o	1:16.38	36	
9	Ida Njåtun	(Norway)	4	i	1:16.77	32	
10	Ivanie Blondin	(Canada)	4	o	1:16.91	28	
11	Roxanne van Hemert	(Netherlands)	2	i	1:17.00	24	
12	Laurine van Riessen	(Netherlands)	5	o	1:17.02	21	
13	Kali Christ	(Canada)	1	i	1:17.09	18	
14	Park Seung-hi	(South Korea)	5	i	1:17.24	16	
15	Vanessa Bittner	(Austria)	7	o	1:17.54	14	
16	Yekaterina Aydova	(Kazakhstan)	3	i	1:17.76	12	
17	Miyako Sumiyoshi	(Japan)	2	o	1:18.01	10	
18	Nadezhda Aseyeva	(Russia)	1	o	1:18.83	8	

=== Division B ===
Rank	Name	Nat.	Pair	Lane	Time	WC points
1	Ayaka Kikuchi	(Japan)	11	o	1:18.15	25
2	Nana Takagi	(Japan)	8	i	1:18.36	19
3	Hege Bøkko	(Norway)	7	i	1:18.71	15
4	Angelina Golikova	(Russia)	9	i	1:18.97	11
5	Miho Takagi	(Japan)	10	i	1:19.04	8
6	Sanneke de Neeling	(Netherlands)	11	i	1:19.12	6
7	Li Huawei	(China)	6	o	1:19.82	4
8	Zhang Xin	(China)	4	i	1:19.83	2
9	Liu Yichi	(China)	9	o	1:19.90	1
10	Roxanne Dufter	(Germany)	5	o	1:19.99	—
11	Sugar Todd	(United States)	3	i	1:20.09	
12	Alexandra Ianculescu	(Canada)	8	o	1:20.11	
13	Tatyana Mikhailova	(Belarus)	4	o	1:20.43	
14	Katarzyna Woźniak	(Poland)	6	i	1:20.66	
15	Jang Mi	(China)	10	o	1:20.72	
16	Elina Risku	(Finland)	3	o	1:20.79	
17	Heather McLean	(Canada)	5	i	1:21.06	
18	Yuliya Kozyreva	(Russia)	2	o	1:21.20	
19	Aleksandra Kachurkina	(Russia)	1	i	1:21.43	
20	Sha Yuning	(China)	7	o	1:22.04	
21	Yvonne Daldossi	(Italy)	2	i	1:22.31	
