= 2014–15 ISU Speed Skating World Cup – World Cup 3 – Men's 1500 metres =

The men's 1500 metres race of the 2014–15 ISU Speed Skating World Cup 3, arranged in Sportforum Hohenschönhausen, in Berlin, Germany, was held on 7 December 2014.

Jan Szymański of Poland won, followed by Sverre Lunde Pedersen of Norway in second place, and Thomas Krol of the Netherlands in third place. Haralds Silovs of Latvia won Division B.

== Results ==
The race took place on Sunday, 7 December, with Division B scheduled in the morning session, at 10:56, and Division A scheduled in the afternoon session, at 13:42.

=== Division A ===
Rank	Name	Nat.	Pair	Lane	Time	WC points	GWC points
1st place, gold medalist(s)	Jan Szymański	(Poland)	7	i	1:46.80	100	100
2nd place, silver medalist(s)	Sverre Lunde Pedersen	(Norway)	10	o	1:47.13	80	80
3rd place, bronze medalist(s)	Thomas Krol	(Netherlands)	7	o	1:47.14	70	70
4	Bart Swings	(Belgium)	6	o	1:47.24	60	60
5	Shani Davis	(United States)	8	i	1:47.58	50	50
6	Denny Morrison	(Canada)	9	o	1:47.61	45	—
7	Konrad Niedźwiedzki	(Poland)	8	o	1:47.69	40	
8	Kjeld Nuis	(Netherlands)	10	i	1:47.72	36	
9	Koen Verweij	(Netherlands)	9	i	1:47.88	32	
10	Lee Seung-hoon	(South Korea)	5	o	1:48.12	28	
11	Zbigniew Bródka	(Poland)	6	i	1:48.15	24	
12	Li Bailin	(China)	5	i	1:48.58	21	
13	Denis Yuskov	(Russia)	1	i	1:48.90	18	
14	Sergey Gryaztsov	(Russia)	2	i	1:49.24	16	
15	Kim Jin-su	(South Korea)	4	i	1:49.82	14	
16	Mikhail Kozlov	(Russia)	3	i	1:50.07	12	
17	Kim Min-seok	(South Korea)	2	o	1:50.43	10	
18	Alec Janssens	(Canada)	3	o	1:50.50	8	
19	Aleksey Suvorov	(Russia)	4	o	1:51.89	6	

=== Division B ===
Rank	Name	Nat.	Pair	Lane	Time	WC points
1	Haralds Silovs	(Latvia)	9	o	1:48.50	25
2	Kai Verbij	(Netherlands)	5	o	1:48.85	19
3	Håvard Holmefjord Lorentzen	(Norway)	16	o	1:48.89	15
4	Pim Schipper	(Netherlands)	6	o	1:49.07	11
5	Ted-Jan Bloemen	(Canada)	7	i	1:49.20	8
6	Benjamin Macé	(France)	15	i	1:49.26	6
7	Joey Mantia	(United States)	9	i	1:49.28	4
8	Alexis Contin	(France)	10	o	1:49.41	2
9	Bram Smallenbroek	(Austria)	17	i	1:49.67	1
10	Jeffrey Swider-Peltz	(United States)	17	o	1:50.01	—
11	Vincent De Haître	(Canada)	14	i	1:50.07	
12	Armin Hager	(Austria)	6	i	1:50.14	
13	Konrád Nagy	(Hungary)	16	i	1:50.18	
14	Mirko Giacomo Nenzi	(Italy)	11	o	1:50.19	
15	Shane Williamson	(Japan)	13	o	1:50.22	
16	Luca Stefani	(Italy)	12	i	1:50.28	
17	Jonathan Garcia	(United States)	8	i	1:50.50	
18	Aleksander Waagenes	(Norway)	5	i	1:50.61	
19	Roland Cieslak	(Poland)	15	o	1:50.68	
20	Hubert Hirschbichler	(Germany)	4	o	1:50.91	
21	Christoffer Fagerli Rukke	(Norway)	7	o	1:51.04	
22	Andrea Giovannini	(Italy)	12	o	1:51.36	
23	Vitaly Mikhailov	(Belarus)	4	i	1:51.42	
24	Denis Dressel	(Germany)	13	i	1:51.56	
25	Jonas Pflug	(Germany)	2	i	1:52.76	
26	Daichi Yamanaka	(Japan)	10	i	1:52.88	
27	David Andersson	(Sweden)	8	o	1:52.95	
28	Liu Yiming	(China)	14	o	1:52.99	
29	Joel Dufter	(Germany)	3	o	1:53.00	
30	Nils van der Poel	(Sweden)	2	o	1:53.01	
31	Alexej Baumgärtner	(Germany)	11	i	1:54.18	
32	Stefan Due Schmidt	(Denmark)	1	i	1:55.64	
33	Reyon Kay	(New Zealand)	3	i	1:56.88	
