= 2014–15 ISU Speed Skating World Cup – World Cup 4 – Women's mass start =

The women's mass start race of the 2014–15 ISU Speed Skating World Cup 4, arranged in the Thialf arena in Heerenveen, Netherlands, was held on 14 December 2014.

Ivanie Blondin of Canada won the race, while Kim Bo-reum of South Korea came second, and Irene Schouten of the Netherlands came third.

== Results ==
The race took place on Sunday, 14 December, scheduled in the afternoon session, at 17:11.

				Race points							
Rank	Name	Nat.	Laps	Split 1	Split 2	Split 3	Finish	Total	Time	WC points	GWC points
1st place, gold medalist(s)	Ivanie Blondin	(Canada)	16				60	60	8:24.01	100	100
2nd place, silver medalist(s)	Kim Bo-reum	(South Korea)	16				40	40	8:24.03	80	80
3rd place, bronze medalist(s)	Irene Schouten	(Netherlands)	16				20	20	8:24.21	70	70
4	Martina Sáblíková	(Czech Republic)	16		3	5		8	8:24.53	60	60
5	Claudia Pechstein	(Germany)	16		5	3		8	8:28.82	50	50
6	Miho Takagi	(Japan)	16	5				5	8:27.66	45	—
7	Kali Christ	(Canada)	16	3				3	8:27.76	40	
8	Nana Takagi	(Japan)	16			1		1	8:24.49	36	
9	Natalya Voronina	(Russia)	16	1				1	8:26.58	32	
10	Francesca Lollobrigida	(Italy)	16		1			1	8:27.89	28	
11	Jun Ye-jin	(South Korea)	16					0	8:24.63	24	
12	Bente Kraus	(Germany)	16					0	8:25.57	21	
13	Jelena Peeters	(Belgium)	16					0	8:26.66	18	
14	Elena Møller-Rigas	(Denmark)	16					0	8:26.98	16	
15	Rixt Meijer	(Netherlands)	16					0	8:27.00	14	
16	Nikola Zdráhalová	(Czech Republic)	16					0	8:27.27	12	
17	Aleksandra Goss	(Poland)	16					0	8:27.37	10	
18	Liu Jing	(China)	16					0	8:27.49	8	
19	Saskia Alusalu	(Estonia)	16					0	8:28.38	6	
20	Urszula Włodarczyk	(Poland)	16					0	8:32.49	5	
21	Tatyana Mikhailova	(Belarus)	16					0	8:32.63	4	
22	Zhang Xin	(China)	16					0	8:34.25	3	
23	Vanessa Bittner	(Austria)	16					0	8:39.37	2	
24	Yvonne Daldossi	(Italy)	16					0	8:55.37	1	
