= 2014–15 ISU Speed Skating World Cup – World Cup 4 =

The fourth competition weekend of the 2014–15 ISU Speed Skating World Cup was held in the Thialf arena in Heerenveen, Netherlands, from Friday, 12 December, until Sunday, 14 December 2014.

Pavel Kulizhnikov of Russia continued his brilliant form from the start of the season by winning three gold medals in the men's competitions; both 500 m races, and the 1000 m race.

In the women's competitions, Heather Richardson and Brittany Bowe made it a "triple double" for the United States by taking gold and silver in three races, the second 500 m, the 1000 m, and the 1500 m.

In the men's 500 m on Friday, Christian Oberbichler of Austria improved his own national record, set only the previous weekend. In the 5000 m race on Saturday, Viktor Hald Torup of Denmark set a new national record, and Nils van der Poel of Sweden set a national junior record.

== Schedule ==
The detailed schedule of events:

Date	Session	Events	Comment
Friday, 12 December	Afternoon	12:00: 500 m women (1); 12:40: 500 m men (1); 13:34: 3000 m women	Division B
Friday, 12 December	Evening	16:00: 3000 m women 16:59: 500 m women (1); 17:22: 500 m men (1)	Division A
Friday, 12 December	Evening	18:12: Team pursuit men	
Saturday, 13 December	Morning	09:30: 1000 m women 10:24: 1000 m men 11:29: 5000 m men	Division B
Saturday, 13 December	Afternoon	14:00: 1000 m women 14:46: 5000 m men	Division A
Saturday, 13 December	Afternoon	16:33: Team pursuit women	
Saturday, 13 December	Afternoon	17:21: 1000 m men	Division A
Sunday, 14 December	Morning	09:00: 1500 m women 10:03: 1500 m men 11:31: 500 m women (2); 12:09: 500 m men (2)	Division B
Sunday, 14 December	Afternoon	14:00: 1500 m women 14:54: 1500 m men 15:47: 500 m women (2); 16:29: 500 m men (2)	Division A
Sunday, 14 December	Afternoon	17:11: Mass start women 17:31: Mass start men	

All times are CET (UTC+1).

== Medal summary ==
=== Men's events ===
Event	Race #	Gold	Time	Silver	Time	Bronze	Time	Report
500 m	1	Pavel Kulizhnikov; Russia	34.63	Artur Waś; Poland	34.91	Laurent Dubreuil; Canada	35.16	
500 m	2	Pavel Kulizhnikov; Russia	34.58	Artur Waś; Poland	34.87	Jan Smeekens; Netherlands	35.01	
1000 m		Pavel Kulizhnikov; Russia	1:08.77	Kjeld Nuis; Netherlands	1:09.04	Hein Otterspeer; Netherlands	1:09.06	
1500 m		Jan Szymański; Poland	1:45.92	Wouter olde Heuvel; Netherlands	1:46.22	Shani Davis; United States	1:46.33	
5000 m		Sven Kramer; Netherlands	6:12.74	Jorrit Bergsma; Netherlands	6:14.08	Wouter olde Heuvel; Netherlands	6:19,58	
Mass start		Jorrit Bergsma; Netherlands	70 ^{A}	Lee Seung-hoon; South Korea	40 ^{A}	Fabio Francolini; Italy	20 ^{A}	
Team pursuit		South Korea; Kim Cheol-min; Ko Byung-wook; Lee Seung-hoon	3:44.57	Netherlands; Arjan Stroetinga; Frank Vreugdenhil; Douwe de Vries	3:44.97	Norway; Håvard Bøkko; Fredrik van der Horst; Sverre Lunde Pedersen	3:45.52	

^{A} In mass start, race points are accumulated during the race. The skater with most race points is the winner.

=== Women's events ===
Event	Race #	Gold	Time	Silver	Time	Bronze	Time	Report
500 m	1	Lee Sang-hwa; South Korea	37.69	Nao Kodaira; Japan	37.70	Judith Hesse; Germany	37.88	
500 m	2	Heather Richardson; United States	37.72	Brittany Bowe; United States	38.05	Lee Sang-hwa; South Korea	38.07	
1000 m		Heather Richardson; United States	1:14.63	Brittany Bowe; United States	1:14.68	Li Qishi; China	1:15.71	
1500 m		Heather Richardson; United States	1:53.87	Brittany Bowe; United States	1:54.70	Marrit Leenstra; Netherlands	1:55.95	
3000 m		Martina Sáblíková; Czech Republic	4:02.84	Ireen Wüst; Netherlands	4:03.14	Carlijn Achtereekte; Netherlands	4:05.95	
Mass start		Ivanie Blondin; Canada	60 ^{A}	Kim Bo-reum; South Korea	40 ^{A}	Irene Schouten; Netherlands	20 ^{A}	
Team pursuit		Netherlands; Carlijn Achtereekte; Linda de Vries; Marrit Leenstra	2:59.69	Germany; Bente Kraus; Claudia Pechstein; Isabell Ost	3:01.96	Poland; Aleksandra Goss; Katarzyna Woźniak; Luiza Złotkowska	3:02.31	

^{A} In mass start, race points are accumulated during the race. The skater with most race points is the winner.
