= 2014–15 ISU Speed Skating World Cup – World Cup 3 – Women's mass start =

The women's mass start race of the 2014–15 ISU Speed Skating World Cup 3, arranged in Sportforum Hohenschönhausen, in Berlin, Germany, was held on 7 December 2014.

Irene Schouten of the Netherlands won the race, while Ivanie Blondin of Canada came second, and Jun Ye-jin of South Korea came third.

== Results ==
The race took place on Sunday, 7 December, scheduled in the afternoon session, at 15:44.

				Race points							
Rank	Name	Nat.	Laps	Split 1	Split 2	Split 3	Finish	Total	Time	WC points	GWC points
1st place, gold medalist(s)	Irene Schouten	(Netherlands)	16			1	60	61	8:32.82	100	100
2nd place, silver medalist(s)	Ivanie Blondin	(Canada)	16			3	40	43	8:32.94	80	80
3rd place, bronze medalist(s)	Jun Ye-jin	(South Korea)	16				20	20	8:33.37	70	70
4	Nana Takagi	(Japan)	16		3	5		8	9:00.04	60	60
5	Martina Sáblíková	(Czech Republic)	16		5			5	8:35.26	50	50
6	Kali Christ	(Canada)	16	5				5	8:36.33	45	—
7	Francesca Lollobrigida	(Italy)	16	3	1			4	8:34.84	40	
8	Liu Jing	(China)	16	3				3	9:01.59	36	
9	Claudia Pechstein	(Germany)	16			1		1	8:36.11	32	
10	Kim Bo-reum	(South Korea)	16					0	8:33.56	28	
11	Miho Takagi	(Japan)	16					0	8:35.07	24	
12	Marina Zueva	(Belarus)	16					0	8:35.53	21	
13	Liu Yichi	(China)	16					0	8:36.36	18	
14	Elena Møller-Rigas	(Denmark)	16					0	8:36.49	16	
15	Natalya Voronina	(Russia)	16					0	8:37.02	14	
16	Nikola Zdráhalová	(Czech Republic)	16					0	8:37.66	12	
17	Saskia Alusalu	(Estonia)	16					0	8:38.23	10	
18	Aleksandra Goss	(Poland)	16					0	8:39.42	8	
19	Yvonne Daldossi	(Italy)	16					0	8:49.71	6	
20	Isabell Ost	(Germany)	16					0	8:50.11	5	
21	Jelena Peeters	(Belgium)	16					0	9:00.42	4	
22	Urszula Włodarczyk	(Poland)	16					0	9:19.22	3	
23	Maria Lamb	(United States)	15					0	8:07.40	2	
23	Heather Richardson	(United States)	15					0	8:07.40	2	
25	Vanessa Bittner	(Austria)	8					0	4:34.35	—	
26	Marije Joling	(Netherlands)							DNS		
27	Bente Kraus	(Germany)							WDR		
