= 2014–15 ISU Speed Skating World Cup – World Cup 3 =

The third competition weekend of the 2014–15 ISU Speed Skating World Cup will be held in Sportforum Hohenschönhausen in Berlin, Germany, from Friday, 5 December, until Sunday, 7 December 2014.

Artur Waś of Poland both men's 500 m races. In the women's competitions, Ireen Wüst of the Netherlands won three gold medals; in the 1500 m and 3000 m races, as well as in the team pursuit. Lee Sang-hwa of South Korea won both 500 m races. Heather Richardson of the United States managed to take no less than four silver medals; in both 500 m races, as well as the 1000 m and 1500 m races.

No world records were set during the weekend, but Christian Oberbichler of Switzerland set a new national record on in the B division of the men's 500 m on Friday, and both Marina Zueva of Belarus and Saskia Alusalu of Estonia set new national records in the B division of the women's 3000 m, also on Friday.

== Schedule ==
The detailed schedule of events:

Date	Session	Events	Comment
Friday, 5 December	Morning	12:10: 3000 m women 13:12: 500 m women (1); 13:37: 500 m men (1)	Division B
Friday, 5 December	Afternoon	16:00: 3000 m women 17:04: 500 m women (1); 17:29: 500 m men (1)	Division A
Friday, 5 December	Afternoon	18:21: Team pursuit men	
Saturday, 6 December	Morning	09:45: 1000 m women 10:29: 1000 m men	Division B
Saturday, 6 December	Afternoon	12:55: 1000 m women 13:25: 1000 m men 14:13: 5000 m men	Division A
Saturday, 6 December	Afternoon	15:40: Team pursuit women	
Saturday, 6 December	Afternoon	17:00: 5000 m men	Division B
Sunday, 7 December	Morning	09:00: 500 m women (2); 09:18: 500 m men (2); 10:05: 1500 m women 10:56: 1500 m men	Division B
Sunday, 7 December	Afternoon	12:50: 1500 m women 13:42: 1500 m men 14:32: 500 m women (2); 14:59: 500 m men (2)	Division A
Sunday, 7 December	Afternoon	15:44: Mass start women 16:14: Mass start men	

All times are CET (UTC+1).

== Medal summary ==
=== Men's events ===
Event	Race #	Gold	Time	Silver	Time	Bronze	Time	Report
500 m	1	Artur Waś; Poland	35.01	Laurent Dubreuil; Canada	35.09	Michel Mulder; Netherlands	35.12	
500 m	2	Artur Waś; Poland	35.04	Espen Aarnes Hvammen; Norway	35.06	Laurent Dubreuil; Canada	35.09	
1000 m		Nico Ihle; Germany	1:09.49	Samuel Schwarz; Germany	1:09.53	Hein Otterspeer; Netherlands	1:09.56	
1500 m		Jan Szymański; Poland	1:46.80	Sverre Lunde Pedersen; Norway	1:47.13	Thomas Krol; Netherlands	1:47.14	
5000 m		Jorrit Bergsma; Netherlands	6:17.59	Sverre Lunde Pedersen; Norway	6:20.97	Douwe de Vries; Netherlands	6:23.50	
Mass start		Lee Seung-hoon; South Korea	61 ^{A}	Arjan Stroetinga; Netherlands	40 ^{A}	Bart Swings; Belgium	25 ^{A}	
Team pursuit		Poland; Zbigniew Bródka; Jan Szymański; Konrad Niedźwiedzki	3:45.88	South Korea; Lee Seung-hoon; Kim Cheol-min; Ko Byung-wook	3:46.97	Netherlands; Douwe de Vries; Arjan Stroetinga; Frank Vreugdenhil	3:47.58	

^{A} In mass start, race points are accumulated during the race. The skater with most race points is the winner.

=== Women's events ===
Event	Race #	Gold	Time	Silver	Time	Bronze	Time	Report
500 m	1	Lee Sang-hwa; South Korea	37.87	Heather Richardson; United States	38.21	Margot Boer; Netherlands	38.40	
500 m	2	Lee Sang-hwa; South Korea	37.96	Heather Richardson; United States	38.07	Nao Kodaira; Japan	38.11	
1000 m		Brittany Bowe; United States	1:14.81	Heather Richardson; United States	1:15.14	Li Qishi; China	1:15.94	
1500 m		Ireen Wüst; Netherlands	1:55.89	Heather Richardson; United States	1:55.91	Marrit Leenstra; Netherlands	1:55.93	
3000 m		Ireen Wüst; Netherlands	4:01.55	Marije Joling; Netherlands	4:03.34	Martina Sáblíková; Czech Republic	4:05.36	
Mass start		Irene Schouten; Netherlands	61 ^{A}	Ivanie Blondin; Canada	43 ^{A}	Jun Ye-jin; South Korea	20 ^{A}	
Team pursuit		Netherlands; Ireen Wüst; Marrit Leenstra; Marije Joling	2:59.72	Poland; Luiza Złotkowska; Katarzyna Woźniak; Aleksandra Goss	3:03.83	Japan; Nana Takagi; Maki Tabata; Ayaka Kikuchi	3:04.00	

^{A} In mass start, race points are accumulated during the race. The skater with most race points is the winner.
