= 2014–15 ISU Speed Skating World Cup – World Cup 3 – Women's 1000 metres =

The women's 1000 metres race of the 2014–15 ISU Speed Skating World Cup 3, arranged in Sportforum Hohenschönhausen, in Berlin, Germany, was held on 6 December 2014.

Brittany Bowe of the United States won, followed by Heather Richardson of the United States in second place, and Li Qishi of China in third place. Janine Smit of the Netherlands won Division B.

== Results ==
The race took place on Saturday, 6 December, with Division B scheduled in the morning session, at 09:45, and Division A scheduled in the afternoon session, at 12:55.

=== Division A ===
Rank	Name	Nat.	Pair	Lane	Time	WC points	GWC points
1st place, gold medalist(s)	Brittany Bowe	(United States)	1	i	1:14.81	100	100
2nd place, silver medalist(s)	Heather Richardson	(United States)	1	o	1:15.14	80	80
3rd place, bronze medalist(s)	Li Qishi	(China)	10	o	1:15.94	70	70
4	Marrit Leenstra	(Netherlands)	10	i	1:15.96	60	60
5	Lee Sang-hwa	(South Korea)	6	i	1:16.40	50	50
6	Laurine van Riessen	(Netherlands)	4	o	1:16.68	45	—
7	Vanessa Bittner	(Austria)	5	o	1:16.83	40	
8	Karolína Erbanová	(Czech Republic)	9	i	1:16.85	36	
9	Park Seung-hi	(South Korea)	6	o	1:16.93	32	
10	Nao Kodaira	(Japan)	9	o	1:17.05	28	
11	Judith Hesse	(Germany)	4	i	1:17.13	24	
12	Ida Njåtun	(Norway)	7	o	1:17.29	21	
13	Yekaterina Aydova	(Kazakhstan)	5	i	1:17.39	18	
14	Roxanne van Hemert	(Netherlands)	3	o	1:17.42	16	
15	Olga Fatkulina	(Russia)	8	o	1:17.51	14	
16	Ivanie Blondin	(Canada)	7	i	1:17.65	12	
17	Yuliya Skokova	(Russia)	8	i	1:17.72	10	
18	Kali Christ	(Canada)	3	i	1:18.11	8	
19	Gabriele Hirschbichler	(Germany)	2	i	1:18.25	6	
20	Luiza Złotkowska	(Poland)	2	o	1:18.37	5	

=== Division B ===
Rank	Name	Nat.	Pair	Lane	Time	WC points
1	Janine Smit	(Netherlands)	4	o	1:17.63	25
2	Letitia de Jong	(Netherlands)	4	i	1:17.68	19
3	Miyako Sumiyoshi	(Japan)	12	i	1:18.14	15
4	Nadezhda Aseyeva	(Russia)	12	o	1:18.45	11
5	Ayaka Kikuchi	(Japan)	11	o	1:18.49	8
6	Angelina Golikova	(Russia)	8	o	1:18.97	6
7	Martina Sáblíková	(Czech Republic)	2	i	1:19.00	4
8	Hege Bøkko	(Norway)	2	o	1:19.042	2
8	Miho Takagi	(Japan)	11	i	1:19.042	2
10	Sha Yuning	(China)	8	i	1:19.27	—
11	Liu Yichi	(China)	9	i	1:19.33	
12	Katarzyna Woźniak	(Poland)	7	i	1:19.80	
13	Margarita Ryzhova	(Russia)	10	i	1:19.85	
14	Li Huawei	(China)	5	i	1:19.95	
15	Alexandra Ianculescu	(Canada)	9	o	1:20.29	
16	Heather McLean	(Canada)	6	i	1:20.36	
17	Roxanne Dufter	(Germany)	1	i	1:20.37	
18	Zhang Xin	(China)	7	o	1:20.63	
19	Jang Mi	(China)	10	o	1:20.73	
20	Tatyana Mikhailova	(Belarus)	3	i	1:21.12	
21	Sugar Todd	(United States)	5	o	1:21.58	
22	Elina Risku	(Finland)	3	o	1:21.73	
23	Yvonne Daldossi	(Italy)	6	o	1:22.89	
