= Tamara Oudenaarden =

Canadian long track speed skater (born 1987)

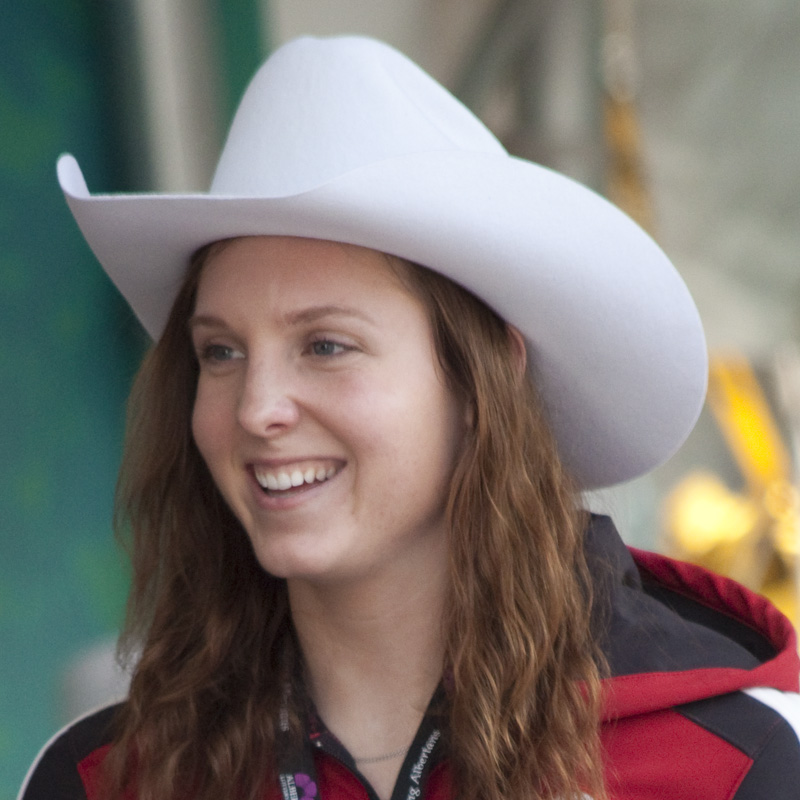

Personal information
- Born: 11 August 1987 (age 38) St. Albert, Alberta, Canada
- Height: 174 cm (5 ft 9 in)
- Weight: 65 kg (143 lb)

Sport
- Country: Canada
- Sport: Speed skating
- Club: Edmonton Speed Skating Association

Achievements and titles
- Olympic finals: 2010

Tamara Oudenaarden (born 11 August 1987) is a Canadian long track speed skater.

She was an alternate skater at the 2010 Winter Olympics in Vancouver in the women's 500 metre competition, but did not race in the event since all other qualifying Canadian skaters competed.

She is of Dutch descent.
