= Carlijn Schoutens =

Dutch-American speed skater

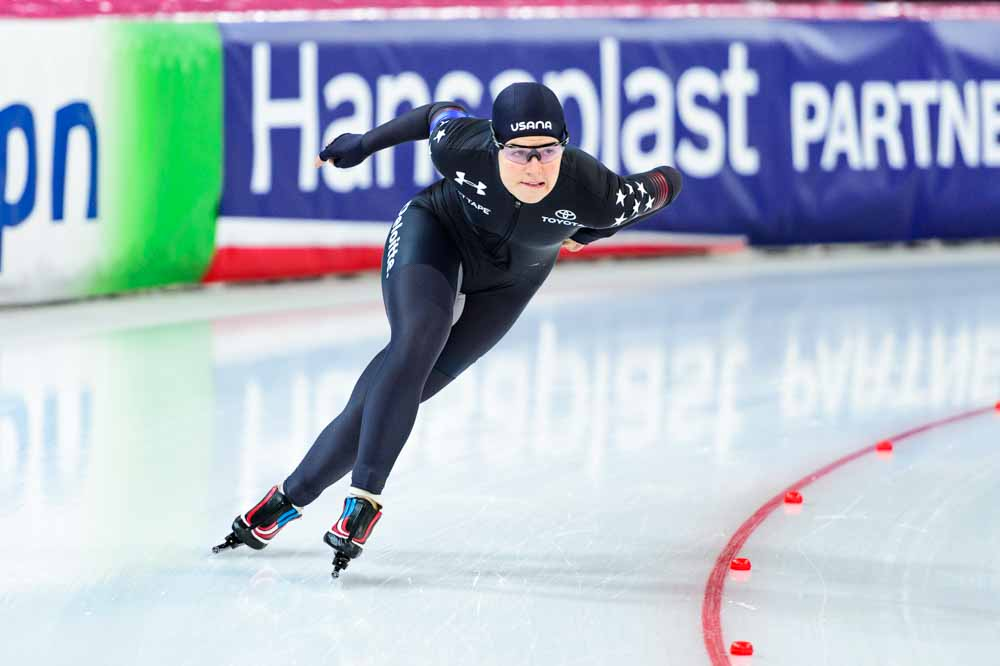
- Carlijn Schoutens at World Cup in Hamar, Norway in February 2019.

Personal information
- Born: December 12, 1994 (age 31) Trenton, New Jersey

Sport
- Coached by: Tom Cushman
Medal record
Women's speed skating
Representing the United States
Olympic Games
Bronze medal – third place	2018 Pyeongchang	Team pursuit

Carlijn Schoutens (born December 12, 1994) is a Dutch-American speed skater who qualified for the U.S. team at the 2018 Winter Olympics in the women's 3000 meter event, the women's 5000 meter event and the Ladies Team Pursuit.

== Early life ==
Schoutens was born in Trenton, New Jersey, to Dutch parents who were living abroad. When she was 7 months old her family returned to the Netherlands and she grew up in the town of Heemstede. She started speedskating in Haarlem and participated in the Dutch national all-around speed skating championships in 2012/2013 as well as Junior National Championships, where she won multiple medals. Holding two passports, she moved to Salt Lake City after contacting Matt Kooreman, a US Speedskating coach, where she elected to compete for the United States over the Netherlands. Carlijn studies medicine remotely at the Vrije Universiteit Amsterdam.

== 2018 Olympics ==
Schoutens qualified for the 2018 Winter Olympics by winning the national title at the United States Olympic Trials in the 3000m and 5000m distances. She was selected to race in the Team Pursuit where Carlijn won a bronze medal after skating in the semi-final race to help her team, consisting of Heather Bergsma, Brittany Bowe and Mia Kilburg Manganello.
