= Wang Nan (speed skater) =

Chinese speed skater

Wang Nan (Chinese: 王楠; pinyin: Wáng Nán; born May 28, 1987, in Jilin) is a Chinese male speed skater. He competed for China at the 2010 Winter Olympics in 500m and 1000m events.
