= Elena Rigas =

Danish inline and speed skater

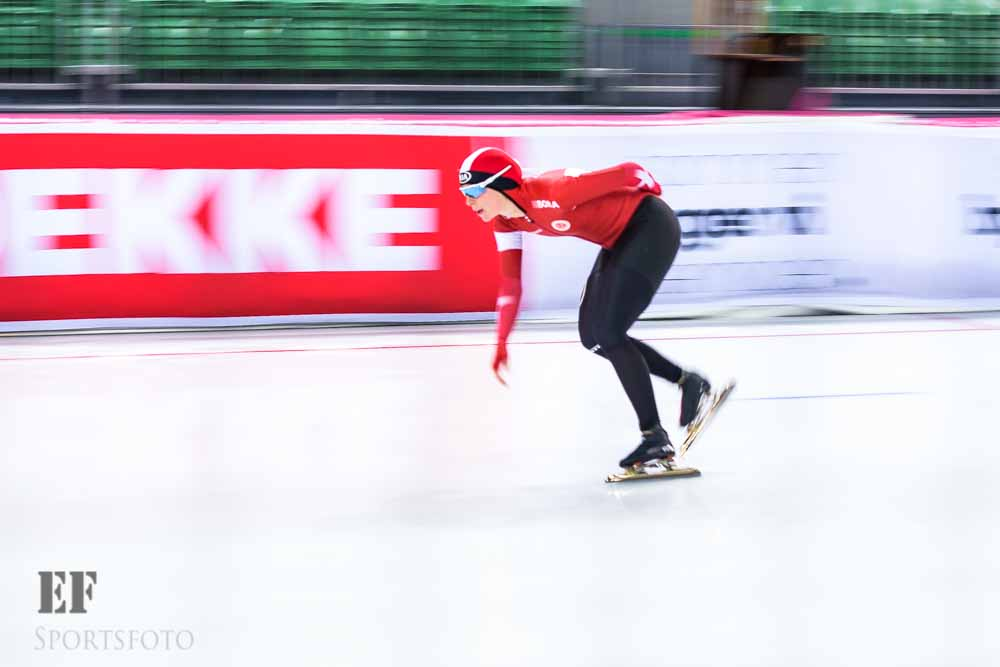

Elena Møller Rigas, born 29 January 1996 in Albertslund is a Danish inline and speed skater. She was selected as flag-bearer for Denmark at the opening ceremony of the 2018 Winter Olympics. She participated in the women's mass start.

== Biography ==
Rigas started out as a roller skater in the Kongens Enghave district of Copenhagen in 2000. The following year she joined Vesterbro Rulleskøjteklub but moved to Vallensbæk Rulleskøjteklub in 2005. She participated three times in the European roller skating championships before taking up ice skating. At the 2015 Junior European Roller Skating Championships in Wörgl, Austria, she won three gold, a silver and a bronze medal.

== Personal records ==
Rigas has achieved the following personal records in speed skating:

Distance	Time	Date	Location
500 meter	41.80	30 September 2016	Inzell
1000 meters	1:21.71	21 October 2016	Inzell
1500 meters	2:02.48	9 December 2017	Salt Lake City
3000 meters	4:11.69	1 December 2017	Calgary
