= 2016–17 ISU Speed Skating World Cup – Women's 500 metres =

The 500 meters distance for women in the 2016–17 ISU Speed Skating World Cup will be contested over 10 races on six occasions, out of a total of World Cup occasions for the season, with the first occasion taking place in Harbin, Canada, on 11–13 November 2016, and the final occasion taking place in Heerenveen, Netherlands, on 11–12 March 2017.

Nao Kodaira of Japan is crowned as the World Cup champion by winning all 8 World Cup races she competed. She did not take part in third round of the World Cup in Astana.

== Top three ==
Position	Athlete	Points	Previous season
1	(Japan) Nao Kodaira	900	11th
2	(Japan) Maki Tsuji	585	13th
3	(Japan) Erina Kamiya	527	12th

== Race medallists ==
WC #	Location	Date	Gold	Time	Silver	Time	Bronze	Time	Report
1	Harbin, China	11 November	Nao Kodaira; Japan	38.00	Maki Tsuji; Japan	38.17	Jing Yu; China	37.22	
1	Harbin, China	13 November	Nao Kodaira; Japan	38.04	Sang-Hwa Lee; South Korea	38.11	Maki Tsuji; Japan	38.30	
2	Nagano, Japan	20 November	Nao Kodaira; Japan	37.75	Sang-Hwa Lee; South Korea	37.93	Jing Yu; China	37.97	
3	Astana, Kazakhstan	2 December	Jing Yu; China	37.85	Hong Zhang; China	37.87	Sang-Hwa Lee; South Korea	37.95	
3	Astana, Kazakhstan	4 December	Jing Yu; China	37.64	Maki Tsuji; Japan	37.82	Erina Kamiya; Japan	37.88	
4	Heerenveen, Netherlands	9 December	Nao Kodaira; Japan	37.69	Jing Yu; China	37.86	Maki Tsuji; Japan	37.97	
5	Berlin, Germany	27 January	Nao Kodaira; Japan	37.43	Karolína Erbanová; Czech Republic	38.12	Olga Fatkulina; Russia	38.36	
5	Berlin, Germany	28 January	Nao Kodaira; Japan	37.57	Karolína Erbanová; Czech Republic	38.28	Heather Bergsma; United States	38.43	
6	Stavanger, Norway	11 March	Nao Kodaira; Japan	37.14	Karolína Erbanová; Czech Republic	37.87	Heather Bergsma; United States	38.13	
6	Stavanger, Norway	12 March	Nao Kodaira; Japan	37.24	Karolína Erbanová; Czech Republic	37.72	Erina Kamiya; Japan	38.06	

== Standings ==
#	Name	Nat.	HRB1	HRB2	NGN	AST1	AST2	HVN	BER1	BER2	STA1	STA2	Total
1	Nao Kodaira	(Japan)	100	100	100	—	—	100	100	100	150	150	900
2	Maki Tsuji	(Japan)	80	70	50	45	80	70	50	60	40	40	585
3	Erina Kamiya	(Japan)	32	40	40	28	70	18	60	45	90	104	527
4	Marsha Hudey	(Canada)	60	60	60	50	36	45	—	—	76	90	477
5	Karolína Erbanová	(Czech Republic)	—	—	—	24	19	28	80	80	120	120	471
6	Jing Yu	(China)	70	32	70	100	100	80	—	—	—	—	452
7	Heather Bergsma	(United States)	50	50	28	—	—	36	45	70	104	45	428
8	Olga Fatkulina	(Russia)	40	24	21	40	45	50	70	36	36	24	386
9	Arisa Go	(Japan)	36	25	32	60	50	40	—	—	45	76	364
10	Sang-Hwa Lee	(South Korea)	45	80	80	70	—	32	—	—	—	—	307
11	Hong Zhang	(China)	28	21	45	80	60	60	—	—	—	—	294
12	Nadezhda Aseeva	(Russia)	16	18	12	14	24	8	24	50	24	32	222
13	Hege Bøkko	(Norway)	14	19	18	18	18	16	21	21	32	36	213
14	Floor van den Brandt	(Netherlands)	14	8	25	21	28	10	18	32	28	28	212
15	Heather McLean	(Canada)	36	45	24	32	40	24	—	—	—	—	201
16	Vanessa Herzog	(Austria)	18	10	36	12	21	14	32	28	—	—	171
17	Marrit Leenstra	(Netherlands)	24	28	16	10	—	12	36	—	—	—	126
18	Anice Das	(Netherlands)	12	16	10	—	—	15	12	16	21	21	123
19	Angelina Golikova	(Russia)	—	—	—	8	8	25	28	40	—	—	109
20	Jorien ter Mors	(Netherlands)	—	—	—	36	25	—	40	—	—	—	101
21	Min Sun Kim	(South Korea)	21	6	14	8	32	5	—	—	—	—	86
22	Bo van der Werff	(Netherlands)	10	12	19	6	12	11	10	—	—	—	80
23	Judith Dannhauer	(Germany)	—	—	—	11	11	19	14	24	—	—	79
24	Yekaterina Aydova	(Kazakhstan)	8	11	15	16	16	0	—	—	—	—	66
25	Janine Smit	(Netherlands)	—	—	—	14	25	—	—	18	—	—	57
26	Seung-Hi Park	(South Korea)	5	15	8	10	15	4	—	—	—	—	57
27	Kaylin Irvine	(Canada)	8	1	11	8	19	8	—	—	—	—	55
28	Noemie Fiset	(Canada)	6	25	8	5	6	0	—	—	—	—	50
29	Xiaoxuan Shi	(China)	2	19	5	6	6	0	—	—	—	—	38
30	Martine Ripsrud	(Norway)	—	—	2	—	0	8	25	—	—	—	35
31	Nan Sun	(China)	—	—	—	—	—	—	25	8	—	—	33
32	Sanneke de Neeling	(Netherlands)	4	6	4	—	—	1	6	12	—	—	33
33	Huawei Li	(China)	—	—	—	—	—	—	11	19	—	—	30
34	Yvonne Daldossi	(Italy)	0	4	2	0	0	0	10	14	—	—	30
35	Yekaterina Shikhova	(Russia)	11	—	—	—	—	—	16	—	—	—	27
36	Min-Jo Kim	(South Korea)	—	—	—	—	—	—	19	6	—	—	25
37	Sugar Todd	(United States)	—	—	—	4	15	6	—	—	—	—	25
38	Saori Toi	(Japan)	1	15	6	0	1	2	—	—	—	—	25
39	Brittany Bowe	(United States)	—	—	—	—	—	21	—	—	—	—	21
40	Rio Yamada	(Japan)	—	—	—	—	—	—	15	5	—	—	20
41	Gabriele Hirschbichler	(Germany)	—	—	0	—	—	—	8	11	—	—	19
42	Min-Ji Kim	(South Korea)	—	—	—	—	—	—	1	15	—	—	16
43	Xue Zhan	(China)	—	—	—	—	—	—	2	11	—	—	13
44	Kelly Gunther	(United States)	6	0	6	0	0	0	—	—	—	—	12
45	Jerica Tandiman	(United States)	—	—	—	—	—	—	6	4	—	—	10
46	Paige Schwartzburg	(United States)	5	0	0	0	—	—	5	—	—	—	10
47	Xin Zhao	(China)	0	8	—	—	—	—	—	—	—	—	8
48	Xue Lin	(China)	0	2	1	0	4	0	—	—	—	—	7
49	Yekaterina Lobysheva	(Russia)	0	—	—	—	—	6	—	—	—	—	6
50	Francesca Bettrone	(Canada)	0	0	0	—	—	—	0	6	—	—	6
51	Natalia Czerwonka	(Poland)	0	—	—	—	—	—	4	—	—	—	4
52	Elina Risku	(Finland)	—	—	—	1	0	0	0	2	—	—	3
53	Ye Won Nam	(South Korea)	0	0	0	0	2	0	—	—	—	—	2
54	Ruining Tian	(China)	—	—	—	—	—	—	0	1	—	—	1
