= 2018 World Sprint Speed Skating Championships – Women =

Women at the 2018 World Allround Sprint Skating Championships
- Venue: Jilin Provincial Speed Skating Rink
- Location: Changchun, China
- Dates: 3–4 March
- Competitors: 21 from 11 nations
- Winning points: 150.735

Medalists
gold medal	Jorien ter Mors	Netherlands
silver medal	Brittany Bowe	United States
bronze medal	Olga Fatkulina	Russia

The Women competition at the 2018 World Sprint Speed Skating Championships was held on 3 and 4 March 2018.

== Results ==
=== 500 m ===
The race was started on 3 March at 17:00.

Rank	Pair	Lane	Name	Country	Time	Diff
1	8	O	Nao Kodaira	Japan	37.23	
2	8	I	Angelina Golikova	Russia	37.78	+0.55
3	11	I	Jorien ter Mors	Netherlands	37.97	+0.74
4	10	O	Arisa Go	Japan	38.06	+0.83
5	10	I	Olga Fatkulina	Russia	38.07	+0.84
6	11	O	Brittany Bowe	United States	38.21	+0.98
7	9	I	Vanessa Herzog	Austria	38.39	+1.15
8	9	O	Yu Jing	China	38.43	+1.19
9	5	O	Marrit Leenstra	Netherlands	38.53	+1.30
10	4	I	Hege Bøkko	Norway	38.60	+1.37
11	4	O	Letitia de Jong	Netherlands	38.93	+1.70
12	6	O	Gabriele Hirschbichler	Germany	39.14	+1.91
13	3	I	Kim Min-jo	South Korea	39.49	+2.26
14	5	I	Zhao Xin	China	39.61	+2.38
15	6	I	Jerica Tandiman	United States	39.87	+2.64
16	2	I	Elina Risku	Finland	39.92	+2.69
17	7	O	Li Qishi	China	40.04	+2.81
18	2	O	Martine Ripsrud	Norway	40.46	+3.23
19	1	I	Anne Gulbrandsen	Norway	40.69	+3.46
20	3	O	Alexandra Ianculescu	Romania	40.74	+3.51
21	7	I	Daria Kachanova	Russia	1:13.33	+36.10

=== 1000 m ===
The race was started on 3 March at 18:42.

Rank	Pair	Lane	Name	Country	Time	Diff
1	10	O	Jorien ter Mors	Netherlands	1:14.62	
2	8	I	Brittany Bowe	United States	1:14.96	+0.34
3	8	O	Marrit Leenstra	Netherlands	1:15.31	+0.69
4	9	O	Nao Kodaira	Japan	1:15.68	+1.06
5	9	I	Hege Bøkko	Norway	1:16.24	+1.62
6	6	I	Letitia de Jong	Netherlands	1:16.63	+2.01
7	11	O	Olga Fatkulina	Russia	1:16.75	+2.13
8	5	I	Gabriele Hirschbichler	Germany	1:17.44	+2.82
9	5	O	Daria Kachanova	Russia	1:17.53	+2.91
10	7	I	Angelina Golikova	Russia	1:17.83	+3.21
11	6	O	Yu Jing	China	1:18.09	+3.47
12	4	I	Li Qishi	China	1:18.41	+3.79
13	3	O	Zhao Xin	China	1:18.92	+4.30
14	10	I	Vanessa Herzog	Austria	1:18.93	+4.31
15	4	O	Jerica Tandiman	United States	1:18.99	+4.37
16	11	I	Arisa Go	Japan	1:19.09	+4.47
17	3	I	Kim Min-jo	South Korea	1:20.24	+5.62
18	1	I	Anne Gulbrandsen	Norway	1:21.44	+6.82
19	2	O	Elina Risku	Finland	1:21.61	+6.99
20	2	I	Martine Ripsrud	Norway	1:22.73	+8.11
21	7	O	Alexandra Ianculescu	Romania	1:24.03	+9.41

=== 500 m ===
The race was started on 4 March at 16:00.

Rank	Pair	Lane	Name	Country	Time	Diff
1	10	I	Nao Kodaira	Japan	37.72	
2	10	O	Jorien ter Mors	Netherlands	37.86	+0.14
3	9	O	Olga Fatkulina	Russia	37.96	+0.24
4	8	O	Angelina Golikova	Russia	37.99	+0.27
5	1	O	Daria Kachanova	Russia	38.20	+0.48
6	9	I	Brittany Bowe	United States	38.26	+0.54
7	6	I	Yu Jing	China	38.41	+0.69
8	5	I	Arisa Go	Japan	38.43	+0.71
9	7	O	Hege Bøkko	Norway	38.50	+0.78
10	8	I	Marrit Leenstra	Netherlands	38.75	+1.03
11	7	I	Letitia de Jong	Netherlands	39.05	+1.33
12	4	O	Kim Min-jo	South Korea	39.28	+1.55
13	4	I	Gabriele Hirschbichler	Germany	39.33	+1.61
14	5	O	Jerica Tandiman	United States	39.55	+1.83
15	6	O	Zhao Xin	China	39.58	+1.86
16	3	O	Elina Risku	Finland	39.80	+2.08
17	3	I	Li Qishi	China	40.00	+2.28
18	2	I	Martine Ripsrud	Norway	40.37	+2.65
19	2	O	Anne Gulbrandsen	Norway	40.59	+2.87
20	1	I	Alexandra Ianculescu	Romania	41.27	+3.55

=== 1000 m ===
The race was started on 4 March at 17:41.

Rank	Pair	Lane	Name	Country	Time	Diff
1	10	I	Jorien ter Mors	Netherlands	1:15.19	
2	10	O	Brittany Bowe	United States	1:15.93	+0.74
3	8	I	Marrit Leenstra	Netherlands	1:15.98	+0.79
4	8	O	Hege Bøkko	Norway	1:16.38	+1.19
5	9	I	Olga Fatkulina	Russia	1:16.44	+1.25
6	2	I	Daria Kachanova	Russia	1:17.20	+2.01
7	6	O	Letitia de Jong	Netherlands	1:17.38	+2.19
8	9	O	Angelina Golikova	Russia	1:17.62	+2.43
9	7	I	Yu Jing	China	1:17.87	+2.68
10	7	O	Arisa Go	Japan	1:18.01	+2.82
11	5	O	Gabriele Hirschbichler	Germany	1:18.24	+3.05
12	6	I	Zhao Xin	China	1:18.93	+3.74
13	5	I	Jerica Tandiman	United States	1:19.13	+3.94
14	3	O	Li Qishi	China	1:19.37	+4.18
15	2	O	Anne Gulbrandsen	Norway	1:20.75	+5.56
16	4	O	Kim Min-jo	South Korea	1:21.80	+6.61
17	4	I	Elina Risku	Finland	1:22.82	+7.63
18	3	I	Alexandra Ianculescu	Romania	1:22.93	+7.74
19	1	I	Martine Ripsrud	Norway	1:24.15	+8.96

=== Overall standings ===
After all events.

Rank	Name	Country	Points	Diff
1st place, gold medalist(s)	Jorien ter Mors	Netherlands	150.735	
2nd place, silver medalist(s)	Brittany Bowe	United States	151.915	+1.18
3rd place, bronze medalist(s)	Olga Fatkulina	Russia	152.620	+1.89
4	Marrit Leenstra	Netherlands	152.925	+2.19
5	Hege Bøkko	Norway	153.410	+2.68
6	Angelina Golikova	Russia	153.495	+2.76
7	Yu Jing	China	154.810	+4.08
8	Letitia de Jong	Netherlands	154.985	+4.25
9	Arisa Go	Japan	155.040	+4.31
10	Gabriele Hirschbichler	Germany	156.310	+5.58
11	Zhao Xin	China	158.115	+7.38
12	Jerica Tandiman	United States	158.480	+7.75
13	Li Qishi	China	158.930	+8.20
14	Kim Min-jo	South Korea	159.790	+9.06
15	Elina Risku	Finland	161.935	+11.20
16	Anne Gulbrandsen	Norway	162.375	+11.64
17	Martine Ripsrud	Norway	164.270	+13.54
18	Alexandra Ianculescu	Romania	165.490	+14.76
19	Daria Kachanova	Russia	188.895	+38.16
–	Nao Kodaira	Japan	—	
–	Vanessa Herzog	Austria	—	
