= 2017 World Sprint Speed Skating Championships – Women =

Women at the 2017 World Sprint Speed Skating Championships
- Venue: Olympic Oval
- Location: Calgary, Canada
- Dates: 25–26 February
- Competitors: 28 from 14 nations
- Winning time: 146.390

Medalists
gold medal	Nao Kodaira	Japan
silver medal	Heather Richardson-Bergsma	United States
bronze medal	Jorien ter Mors	Netherlands

The Women competition at the 2017 World Championships was held on 25 and 26 February 2017.

== Results ==
=== 500 m ===
The race was started on 25 February 2017 at 12:30.

Rank	Pair	Lane	Name	Country	Time	Diff
1	13	i	Nao Kodaira	Japan	36.75	
2	11	o	Karolína Erbanová	Czech Republic	37.06	+0.31
3	11	i	Heather Richardson-Bergsma	United States	37.22	+0.47
4	8	i	Hege Bøkko	Norway	37.43	+0.68
5	14	o	Jorien ter Mors	Netherlands	37.55	+0.80
6	12	i	Maki Tsuji	Japan	37.56	+0.81
7	10	o	Vanessa Herzog	Austria	37.59	+0.84
8	12	o	Heather McLean	Canada	37.66	+0.91
9	7	i	Nadezhda Aseeva	Russia	37.70	+0.95
10	8	o	Yekaterina Aydova	Kazakhstan	37.71	+0.96
11	14	i	Olga Fatkulina	Russia	37.90	+1.15
12	13	o	Erina Kamiya	Japan	37.91	+1.16
13	10	i	Sugar Todd	United States	37.95	+1.20
14	1	o	Yekaterina Shikhova	Russia	38.11	+1.36
15	2	o	Yvonne Daldossi	Italy	38.27	+1.52
16	9	o	Sanneke de Neeling	Netherlands	38.29	+1.54
17	3	i	Francesca Bettrone	Italy	38.34	+1.59
18	6	i	Gabriele Hirschbichler	Germany	38.39	+1.64
19	2	i	Martine Ripsrud	Norway	38.40	+1.65
20	7	o	Anice Das	Netherlands	38.43	+1.68
21	9	i	Judith Dannhauer	Germany	38.45	+1.70
22	1	i	Sun Nan	China	38.71	+1.96
23	4	o	Jerica Tandiman	United States	38.83	+2.08
24	3	o	Natalia Czerwonka	Poland	38.86	+2.11
25	6	o	Li Huawei	China	38.96	+2.21
26	5	i	Tian Ruining	China	39.17	+2.42
27	5	o	Roxanne Dufter	Germany	39.27	+2.52
28	4	i	Alexandra Ianculescu	Romania	39.65	+2.90

=== 1000 m ===
The race was started on 25 February 2017 at 14:11.

Rank	Pair	Lane	Name	Country	Time	Diff
1	13	o	Nao Kodaira	Japan	1:12.51	
2	12	i	Jorien ter Mors	Netherlands	1:12.53	+0.02
3	14	o	Heather Richardson-Bergsma	United States	1:12.95	+0.44
4	13	i	Karolína Erbanová	Czech Republic	1:13.53	+1.02
5	11	o	Hege Bøkko	Norway	1:13.96	+1.45
6	12	o	Yekaterina Shikhova	Russia	1:14.46	+1.95
7	1	i	Roxanne Dufter	Germany	1:14.61	+2.10
8	8	i	Olga Fatkulina	Russia	1:14.64	+2.13
9	9	o	Sanneke de Neeling	Netherlands	1:14.69	+2.18
10	11	i	Vanessa Herzog	Austria	1:14.74	+2.23
10	3	i	Yekaterina Aydova	Kazakhstan	1:14.74	+2.23
12	10	i	Natalia Czerwonka	Poland	1:14.84	+2.33
13	7	o	Gabriele Hirschbichler	Germany	1:14.93	+2.41
14	10	o	Maki Tsuji	Japan	1:15.02	+2.51
15	5	i	Sugar Todd	United States	1:15.05	+2.54
16	8	o	Erina Kamiya	Japan	1:15.27	+2.76
17	4	o	Francesca Bettrone	Italy	1:15.76	+3.25
18	14	i	Heather McLean	Canada	1:15.78	+3.27
19	1	o	Nadezhda Aseeva	Russia	1:16.00	+3.49
20	6	i	Anice Das	Netherlands	1:16.35	+3.84
21	7	i	Sun Nan	China	1:16.37	+3.86
22	6	o	Martine Ripsrud	Norway	1:16.62	+4.11
23	3	o	Judith Dannhauer	Germany	1:16.84	+4.33
24	9	i	Jerica Tandiman	United States	1:16.88	+4.37
25	2	i	Tian Ruining	China	1:16.91	+4.40
26	2	o	Yvonne Daldossi	Italy	1:17.93	+5.42
27	4	i	Li Huawei	China	1:18.54	+6.03
28	5	o	Alexandra Ianculescu	Romania	1:19.41	+6.90

=== 500 m ===
The race was started on 26 February 2017 at 12:30.

Rank	Pair	Lane	Name	Country	Time	Diff
1	14	o	Nao Kodaira	Japan	36.80	
2	13	i	Karolína Erbanová	Czech Republic	37.23	+0.43
3	11	o	Maki Tsuji	Japan	37.28	+0.48
4	8	i	Heather McLean	Canada	37.29	+0.49
5	13	o	Heather Richardson-Bergsma	United States	37.35	+0.55
6	14	i	Jorien ter Mors	Netherlands	37.39	+0.59
7	10	o	Olga Fatkulina	Russia	37.58	+0.78
8	8	o	Nadezhda Aseeva	Russia	37.73	+0.93
9	9	i	Erina Kamiya	Japan	37.76	+0.96
10	12	o	Hege Bøkko	Norway	37.88	+1.08
11	9	o	Sugar Todd	United States	38.04	+1.24
12	12	i	Vanessa Herzog	Austria	38.05	+1.25
13	11	i	Yekaterina Aydova	Kazakhstan	38.12	+1.32
14	6	o	Francesca Bettrone	Italy	38.24	+1.44
15	7	o	Gabriele Hirschbichler	Germany	38.31	+1.51
15	4	i	Anice Das	Netherlands	38.31	+1.51
17	10	i	Yekaterina Shikhova	Russia	38.34	+1.54
18	5	o	Martine Ripsrud	Norway	38.48	+1.68
19	4	o	Judith Dannhauer	Germany	38.57	+1.77
20	7	i	Sanneke de Neeling	Netherlands	38.63	+1.83
21	3	i	Yvonne Daldossi	Italy	38.76	+1.96
22	3	o	Sun Nan	China	38.88	+2.08
23	2	i	Jerica Tandiman	United States	38.97	+2.17
24	1	i	Li Huawei	China	39.08	+2.28
25	6	i	Natalia Czerwonka	Poland	39.10	+2.30
26	5	i	Roxanne Dufter	Germany	39.51	+2.71
27	1	o	Alexandra Ianculescu	Romania	39.77	+2.97
28	2	o	Tian Ruining	China	1:04.47	+27.67

=== 1000 m ===
The race was started on 26 February 2017 at 14:14.

Rank	Pair	Lane	Name	Country	Time	Diff
1	13	i	Heather Richardson-Bergsma	United States	1:12.28	
2	13	o	Jorien ter Mors	Netherlands	1:12.58	+0.30
3	14	i	Nao Kodaira	Japan	1:13.17	+0.89
4	14	o	Karolína Erbanová	Czech Republic	1:13.83	+1.55
5	8	i	Yekaterina Shikhova	Russia	1:13.95	+1.67
6	12	i	Hege Bøkko	Norway	1:14.04	+1.76
7	11	i	Maki Tsuji	Japan	1:14.10	+1.82
8	6	i	Sanneke de Neeling	Netherlands	1:14.33	+2.05
9	11	o	Heather McLean	Canada	1:14.36	+2.08
10	10	o	Vanessa Herzog	Austria	1:14.46	+2.17
11	7	i	Gabriele Hirschbichler	Germany	1:14.49	+2.21
12	6	o	Natalia Czerwonka	Poland	1:14.78	+2.50
13	9	i	Nadezhda Aseeva	Russia	1:14.80	+2.52
14	10	i	Erina Kamiya	Japan	1:15.02	+2.74
15	9	o	Yekaterina Aydova	Kazakhstan	1:15.02	+2.74
16	7	o	Anice Das	Netherlands	1:15.11	+2.83
17	12	o	Olga Fatkulina	Russia	1:15.17	+2.89
18	4	o	Roxanne Dufter	Germany	1:15.51	+3.23
19	5	i	Francesca Bettrone	Italy	1:15.70	+3.42
20	8	o	Sugar Todd	United States	1:15.89	+3.61
21	5	o	Sun Nan	China	1:16.40	+4.12
22	3	i	Judith Dannhauer	Germany	1:16.80	+4.52
23	3	o	Jerica Tandiman	United States	1:16.83	+4.55
24	4	i	Martine Ripsrud	Norway	1:17.08	+4.80
25	1	o	Tian Ruining	China	1:17.69	+5.14
26	2	i	Yvonne Daldossi	Italy	1:17.86	+5.58
27	2	o	Li Huawei	China	1:18.94	+6.66
28	1	i	Alexandra Ianculescu	Romania	1:19.94	+7.66

=== Overall standings ===
After all events.

Rank	Name	Country	Points	Diff
1st place, gold medalist(s)	Nao Kodaira	Japan	146.390WR	
2nd place, silver medalist(s)	Heather Richardson-Bergsma	United States	147.185	+0.80
3rd place, bronze medalist(s)	Jorien ter Mors	Netherlands	147.495	+1.11
4	Karolína Erbanová	Czech Republic	147.970	+1.58
5	Hege Bøkko	Norway	149.310	+2.92
6	Maki Tsuji	Japan	149.400	+3.01
7	Heather McLean	Canada	150.020	+3.63
8	Vanessa Herzog	Austria	150.235	+3.85
9	Olga Fatkulina	Russia	150.385	+4.00
10	Yekaterina Shikhova	Russia	150.655	+4.27
11	Yekaterina Aydova	Kazakhstan	150.710	+4.32
12	Erina Kamiya	Japan	150.815	+4.43
13	Nadezhda Aseeva	Russia	150.830	+4.44
14	Gabriele Hirschbichler	Germany	151.410	+5.02
15	Sanneke de Neeling	Netherlands	151.430	+5.04
16	Sugar Todd	United States	151.460	+5.07
17	Francesca Bettrone	Italy	152.310	+5.92
18	Anice Das	Netherlands	152.470	+6.08
19	Natalia Czerwonka	Poland	152.770	+6.38
20	Martine Ripsrud	Norway	153.730	+7.34
21	Judith Dannhauer	Germany	153.840	+7.45
21	Roxanne Dufter	Germany	153.840	+7.45
23	Sun Nan	China	153.975	+7.59
24	Jerica Tandiman	United States	154.655	+8.27
25	Yvonne Daldossi	Italy	154.925	+8.54
26	Li Huawei	China	156.780	+10.39
27	Alexandra Ianculescu	Romania	159.095	+12.71
28	Tian Ruining	China	180.940	+34.55
