= 2016–17 ISU Speed Skating World Cup – World Cup 1 – Women's 500 metres =

The women's 500 metres races of the 2016–17 ISU Speed Skating World Cup 1, arranged in the Heilongjiang Indoor Rink, in Harbin, China, were held on 11 and 13 November 2016.

Nao Kodaira of Japan won the first race, while Maki Tsuji of Japan came second, and Yu Jing of China came third. Arisa Go of Japan won the first Division B race.

== Race 1 ==
Race one took place on Friday, 11 November, with Division B scheduled in the morning session, at 11:45, and Division A scheduled in the afternoon session, at 16:00.

=== Division A ===
Rank	Name	Nat.	Pair	Lane	Time	WC points	GWC points
1st place, gold medalist(s)	Nao Kodaira	(Japan)	6	o	38.00	100	50
2nd place, silver medalist(s)	Maki Tsuji	(Japan)	5	o	38.17	80	40
3rd place, bronze medalist(s)	Yu Jing	(China)	10	i	38.18	70	35
4	Marsha Hudey	(Canada)	3	i	38.29	60	30
5	Heather Bergsma	(United States)	9	o	38.39	50	25
6	Lee Sang-hwa	(South Korea)	9	i	38.47	45	
7	Olga Fatkulina	(Russia)	6	i	38.50	40	
8	Heather McLean	(Canada)	8	o	38.65	36	
9	Erina Kamiya	(Japan)	5	i	38.74	32	
10	Zhang Hong	(China)	7	o	38.82	28	
11	Marrit Leenstra	(Netherlands)	7	i	38.99	24	
12	Kim Min-Sun	(South Korea)	3	o	39.11	21	
13	Vanessa Herzog	(Austria)	8	i	39.13	18	
14	Nadezhda Aseyeva	(Russia)	2	o	39.24	16	
15	Floor van den Brandt	(Netherlands)	1	o	39.35	14	
16	Anice Das	(Netherlands)	4	i	39.54	12	
17	Bo van der Werff	(Netherlands)	1	i	39.78	10	
18	Yekaterina Aydova	(Kazakhstan)	2	i	40.16	8	
19	Kelly Gunther	(United States)	10	o	40.45	6	
20	Paige Schwartzburg	(United States)	4	o	40.72	5	

Note: NR = national record.

=== Division B ===
Rank	Name	Nat.	Pair	Lane	Time	WC points
1	Arisa Go	(Japan)	8	o	38.80	25
2	Hege Bøkko	(Norway)	4	i	39.41	19
3	Park Seung-Hi	(South Korea)	8	i	39.64	15
4	Yekaterina Shikhova	(Russia)	3	i	39.65	11
5	Kaylin Irvine	(Canada)	4	o	39.70	8
6	Noemi Fiset	(Canada)	6	o	39.75	6
7	Sanneke de Neeling	(Netherlands)	7	o	39.77	4
8	Shi Xiaoxuan	(China)	9	i	39.79	2
9	Saori Toi	(Japan)	3	o	39.99	1
10	Yekaterina Lobysheva	(Russia)	9	o	40.04	—
11	Nam Ye-Won	(South Korea)	5	o	40.11	
12	Zhao Xin	(China)	5	i	40.18	
13	Francesca Bettrone	(Italy)	1	i	40.59	
14	Yvonne Daldossi	(Italy)	6	i	40.60	
15	Alexandra Ianculescu	(Romania)	1	o	40.67	
16	Lin Xue	(China)	7	i	40.71	
17	Natalia Czerwonka	(Poland)	2	o	40.81	
18	Tatyana Mikhailova	(Belarus)	2	i	41.12	
