= 2014–15 ISU Speed Skating World Cup – World Cup 2 – Women's 500 metres =

The women's 500 metres races of the 2014–15 ISU Speed Skating World Cup 2, arranged in the Taereung International Ice Rink, in Seoul, South Korea, were held on the weekend of 21–23 November 2014.

Race one was won by Nao Kodaira of Japan, while Lee Sang-hwa of South Korea came second, and Judith Hesse of Germany came third. Anice Das of the Netherlands won Division B of race one, and was thus, under the rules, automatically promoted to Division A for race two.

In race two, Lee managed to beat Kodaira, while Karolína Erbanová of the Czech Republic took the bronze. Nadezhda Aseyeva of Russia won Division B of race two.

== Race 1 ==
Race one took place on Friday, 21 November, with Division B scheduled in the morning session, at 11:50, and Division A scheduled in the afternoon session, at 16:10.

=== Division A ===
Rank	Name	Nat.	Pair	Lane	Time	WC points	GWC points
1st place, gold medalist(s)	Nao Kodaira	(Japan)	10	o	38.05	100	50
2nd place, silver medalist(s)	Lee Sang-hwa	(South Korea)	10	i	38.18	80	40
3rd place, bronze medalist(s)	Judith Hesse	(Germany)	8	o	38.95	70	35
4	Floor van den Brandt	(Netherlands)	7	i	39.00	60	30
5	Yekaterina Aydova	(Kazakhstan)	3	o	39.021	50	25
6	Zhang Hong	(China)	2	o	39.024	45	—
7	Karolína Erbanová	(Czech Republic)	5	i	39.06	40	
8	Thijsje Oenema	(Netherlands)	7	o	39.082	36	
9	Bo van der Werff	(Netherlands)	6	o	39.086	32	
10	Margot Boer	(Netherlands)	9	o	39.12	28	
11	Park Seung-hi	(South Korea)	4	o	39.13	24	
12	Olga Fatkulina	(Russia)	9	i	39.141	21	
12	Maki Tsuji	(Japan)	6	i	39.141	21	
14	Li Qishi	(China)	5	o	39.16	16	
15	Vanessa Bittner	(Austria)	8	i	39.19	14	
16	Miyako Sumiyoshi	(Japan)	4	i	39.26	12	
17	Jang Mi	(China)	1	i	39.36	10	
18	Angelina Golikova	(Russia)	2	i	39.38	8	
19	Li Huawei	(China)	1	o	39.61	6	
20	Arisa Go	(Japan)	3	i	39.67	5	

=== Division B ===
Rank	Name	Nat.	Pair	Lane	Time	WC points
1	Anice Das	(Netherlands)	8	i	39.25	25
2	Nadezhda Aseyeva	(Russia)	8	o	39.35	19
3	Lee Bo-ra	(South Korea)	6	i	39.61	15
4	Denise Roth	(Germany)	6	o	39.67	11
5	Yvonne Daldossi	(Italy)	3	i	39.85	8
6	Yuliya Kozyreva	(Russia)	7	o	39.93	6
7	Gabriele Hirschbichler	(Germany)	5	i	39.99	4
8	Heather McLean	(Canada)	5	o	40.04	2
9	Kim Min-sun	(South Korea)	1	i	40.06	1
10	Alexandra Ianculescu	(Canada)	4	i	40.17	—
11	Zhang Yue	(China)	3	o	40.28	
12	Mio Kuroiwa	(Japan)	4	o	40.30	
13	Tamara Oudenaarden	(Canada)	2	i	40.88	
14	Ágota Lykovcán	(Hungary)	2	o	41.20	
15	Marsha Hudey	(Canada)	7	i	DQ	

== Race 2 ==
Race two took place on Saturday, 22 November, with Division B scheduled in the morning session, at 10:38, and Division A scheduled in the afternoon session, at 15:51.

=== Division A ===
Rank	Name	Nat.	Pair	Lane	Time	WC points	GWC points
1st place, gold medalist(s)	Lee Sang-hwa	(South Korea)	11	o	37.99	100	50
2nd place, silver medalist(s)	Nao Kodaira	(Japan)	11	i	38.51	80	40
3rd place, bronze medalist(s)	Karolína Erbanová	(Czech Republic)	9	o	38.83	70	35
4	Floor van den Brandt	(Netherlands)	10	o	38.84	60	30
5	Olga Fatkulina	(Russia)	8	o	38.88	50	25
6	Maki Tsuji	(Japan)	7	o	38.89	45	—
7	Li Qishi	(China)	3	i	38.924	40	
8	Thijsje Oenema	(Netherlands)	7	i	38.926	36	
9	Vanessa Bittner	(Austria)	6	o	39.04	32	
10	Miyako Sumiyoshi	(Japan)	4	o	39.07	28	
11	Judith Hesse	(Germany)	10	i	39.126	24	
12	Anice Das	(Netherlands)	5	o	39.129	21	
13	Yekaterina Aydova	(Kazakhstan)	9	i	39.24	18	
14	Margot Boer	(Netherlands)	5	i	39.251	16	
15	Bo van der Werff	(Netherlands)	6	i	39.254	14	
16	Angelina Golikova	(Russia)	2	o	39.31	12	
17	Zhang Hong	(China)	8	i	39.33	10	
18	Jang Mi	(South Korea)	3	o	39.34	8	
19	Park Seung-hi	(South Korea)	4	i	39.35	6	
20	Arisa Go	(Japan)	1	o	39.93	5	
21	Li Huawei	(China)	2	i	40.12	4	

=== Division B ===
Rank	Name	Nat.	Pair	Lane	Time	WC points
1	Nadezhda Aseyeva	(Russia)	7	i	39.24	25
2	Lee Bo-ra	(South Korea)	7	o	39.34	19
3	Kim Min-sun	(South Korea)	4	o	39.38	15
4	Yuliya Kozyreva	(Russia)	5	i	39.68	11
5	Marsha Hudey	(Canada)	1	o	39.75	8
6	Denise Roth	(Germany)	6	i	39.76	6
7	Yvonne Daldossi	(Italy)	6	o	39.82	4
8	Gabriele Hirschbichler	(Germany)	5	o	39.98	2
9	Tamara Oudenaarden	(Canada)	2	o	40.16	1
10	Heather McLean	(Canada)	4	i	40.34	—
11	Zhang Yue	(China)	3	i	40.38	
12	Mio Kuroiwa	(Japan)	2	i	40.51	
13	Alexandra Ianculescu	(Canada)	3	o	40.72	
14	Ágota Lykovcán	(Hungary)	1	i	41.43	
