= 2014–15 ISU Speed Skating World Cup – World Cup 2 – Women's 1000 metres =

The women's 1000 metres race of the 2014–15 ISU Speed Skating World Cup 2, arranged in the Taereung International Ice Rink, in Seoul, South Korea, was held on 23 November 2014.

The race was won by Li Qishi of China, while Marrit Leenstra of the Netherlands in second place, and Karolína Erbanová of the Czech Republic in third place. Laurine van Riessen of the Netherlands won Division B.

== Results ==
The race took place on Sunday, 23 November, with Division B scheduled in the morning session, at 10:30, and Division A scheduled in the afternoon session, at 13:00.

=== Division A ===
Rank	Name	Nat.	Pair	Lane	Time	WC points	GWC points
1st place, gold medalist(s)	Li Qishi	(China)	9	i	1:16.95	100	100
2nd place, silver medalist(s)	Marrit Leenstra	(Netherlands)	10	i	1:17.06	80	80
3rd place, bronze medalist(s)	Karolína Erbanová	(Czech Republic)	8	i	1:17.33	70	70
4	Nao Kodaira	(Japan)	7	i	1:17.88	60	60
5	Ivanie Blondin	(Canada)	2	i	1:18.12	50	50
6	Ireen Wüst	(Netherlands)	10	o	1:18.17	45	—
7	Yuliya Skokova	(Russia)	6	o	1:18.46	40	
8	Ida Njåtun	(Norway)	5	o	1:18.536	36	
9	Zhang Hong	(China)	9	o	1:18.538	32	
10	Park Seung-hi	(South Korea)	4	i	1:18.57	28	
11	Olga Fatkulina	(Russia)	8	o	1:18.68	24	
12	Kali Christ	(Canada)	1	i	1:18.96	21	
13	Yekaterina Aydova	(Kazakhstan)	7	o	1:19.11	18	
14	Vanessa Bittner	(Austria)	6	i	1:19.16	16	
15	Roxanne van Hemert	(Netherlands)	4	o	1:19.32	14	
16	Miyako Sumiyoshi	(Japan)	3	i	1:19.42	12	
17	Ayaka Kikuchi	(Japan)	1	o	1:19.55	10	
18	Miho Takagi	(Japan)	2	o	1:19.60	8	
19	Sanneke de Neeling	(Netherlands)	5	i	1:19.69	6	
20	Nadezhda Aseyeva	(Russia)	3	o	1:19.84	5	

=== Division B ===
Rank	Name	Nat.	Pair	Lane	Time	WC points
1	Laurine van Riessen	(Netherlands)	8	i	1:19.39	25
2	Gabriele Hirschbichler	(Germany)	9	i	1:19.54	19
3	Luiza Złotkowska	(Poland)	4	o	1:19.94	15
4	Margarita Ryzhova	(Russia)	7	o	1:20.19	11
5	Maki Tabata	(Japan)	3	o	1:20.66	8
6	Jang Mi	(South Korea)	8	o	1:21.22	6
7	Alexandra Ianculescu	(Canada)	5	i	1:21.50	4
8	Sha Yuning	(China)	6	i	1:21.52	2
9	Katarzyna Woźniak	(Poland)	6	o	1:21.64	1
10	Liu Yichi	(China)	9	o	1:21.65	—
11	Angelina Golikova	(Russia)	7	i	1:21.71	
12	Lee Bo-ra	(South Korea)	3	i	1:21.72	
13	Kim Min-sun	(South Korea)	2	o	1:22.04	
14	Yvonne Daldossi	(Italy)	4	i	1:22.18	
15	Heather McLean	(China)	5	o	1:22.76	
16	Li Huawei	(China)	1	i	1:22.91	
17	Ágota Lykovcán	(Hungary)	2	i	1:23.00	
