= 2019 World Sprint Speed Skating Championships – Women =

Women at the 2019 World Sprint Speed Skating Championships
- Venue: Thialf
- Location: Heerenveen, Netherlands
- Dates: 23–24 February
- Competitors: 28 from 15 nations
- Winning points: 149.665

Medalists
gold medal	Nao Kodaira	Japan
silver medal	Miho Takagi	Japan
bronze medal	Brittany Bowe	United States

The Women competition at the 2019 World Sprint Speed Skating Championships was held on 23 and 24 February 2019.

== Results ==
=== 500 m ===
The race was started on 23 February at 15:00.

Rank	Pair	Lane	Name	Country	Time	Diff
1	14	O	Nao Kodaira	Japan	37.27	
2	13	O	Vanessa Herzog	Austria	37.31	+0.04
3	13	I	Angelina Golikova	Russia	37.49	+0.22
4	10	I	Miho Takagi	Japan	37.62	+0.35
5	14	I	Brittany Bowe	United States	37.89	+0.62
6	11	I	Olga Fatkulina	Russia	37.99	+0.72
7	12	O	Daria Kachanova	Russia	38.00	+0.73
8	10	O	Yekaterina Aydova	Kazakhstan	38.04	+0.77
9	9	I	Maki Tsuji	Japan	38.07	+0.80
10	9	O	Sanneke de Neeling	Netherlands	38.09	+0.82
11	11	O	Heather McLean	Canada	38.10	+0.83
12	7	O	Jin Jingzhu	China	38.24	+0.97
13	8	O	Kaylin Irvine	Canada	38.38	+1.11
14	12	I	Letitia de Jong	Netherlands	38.45	+1.18
15	6	O	Kimi Goetz	United States	38.49	+1.22
16	8	I	Jutta Leerdam	Netherlands	38.58	+1.31
17	7	I	Hege Bøkko	Norway	38.76	+1.49
18	6	I	Zhao Xin	China	38.82	+1.55
19	3	O	Li Qishi	China	38.98	+1.71
20	5	I	Huang Yu-ting	Chinese Taipei	39.05	+1.78
21	1	I	Natalia Czerwonka	Poland	39.36	+2.09
22	5	O	Gabriele Hirschbichler	Germany	39.38	+2.11
23	2	O	Hanna Nifantava	Belarus	39.44	+2.17
24	3	I	Brianna Bocox	United States	39.47	+2.20
25	4	I	Kim Min-ji	South Korea	39.52	+2.25
26	2	I	Anne Gulbrandsen	Norway	39.61	+2.34
27	1	O	Park Chae-eun	South Korea	40.32	+3.05
28	4	O	María Victoria Rodríguez	Argentina	40.41	+3.14

=== 1000 m ===
The race was started on 23 February at 16:20.

Rank	Pair	Lane	Name	Country	Time	Diff
1	11	I	Brittany Bowe	United States	1:14.60	
2	14	O	Miho Takagi	Japan	1:14.82	+0.22
3	9	I	Daria Kachanova	Russia	1:14.94	+0.34
4	12	I	Nao Kodaira	Japan	1:15.01	+0.41
5	7	I	Sanneke de Neeling	Netherlands	1:15.08	+0.48
6	13	O	Jutta Leerdam	Netherlands	1:15.31	+0.71
7	7	O	Yekaterina Aydova	Kazakhstan	1:15.36	+0.76
8	13	I	Vanessa Herzog	Austria	1:15.78	+1.18
9	10	I	Natalia Czerwonka	Poland	1:16.10	+1.50
10	3	I	Angelina Golikova	Russia	1:16.11	+1.51
11	12	O	Li Qishi	China	1:16.17	+1.57
12	8	I	Heather McLean	Canada	1:16.23	+1.63
13	14	I	Letitia de Jong	Netherlands	1:16.39	+1.79
14	11	O	Olga Fatkulina	Russia	1:16.48	+1.88
15	3	O	Maki Tsuji	Japan	1:16.71	+2.11
16	9	O	Kaylin Irvine	Canada	1:16.92	+2.32
17	6	I	Gabriele Hirschbichler	Germany	1:17.01	+2.41
18	5	O	Jin Jingzhu	China	1:17.11	+2.51
19	8	O	Kimi Goetz	United States	1:17.14	+2.54
20	10	O	Huang Yu-ting	Chinese Taipei	1:17.71	+3.11
21	6	O	Zhao Xin	China	1:17.81	+3.21
22	4	O	Hege Bøkko	Norway	1:18.19	+3.59
23	5	I	Brianna Bocox	United States	1:18.37	+3.77
24	4	I	Anne Gulbrandsen	Norway	1:19.04	+4.44
25	2	I	Kim Min-ji	South Korea	1:20.21	+5.61
26	2	O	Hanna Nifantava	Belarus	1:20.47	+5.87
27	1	O	Park Chae-eun	South Korea	1:21.38	+6.78
28	1	I	María Victoria Rodríguez	Argentina	1:23.09	+8.49

=== 500 m ===
The race was started on 24 February at 15:00.

Rank	Pair	Lane	Name	Country	Time	Diff
1	14	I	Nao Kodaira	Japan	37.41	
2	13	O	Brittany Bowe	United States	37.67	+0.26
3	12	O	Angelina Golikova	Russia	37.71	+0.30
4	14	O	Miho Takagi	Japan	37.74	+0.33
5	13	I	Vanessa Herzog	Austria	37.81	+0.40
6	11	O	Olga Fatkulina	Russia	37.90	+0.49
7	10	I	Yekaterina Aydova	Kazakhstan	37.94	+0.53
8	9	O	Maki Tsuji	Japan	38.00	+0.59
9	8	O	Letitia de Jong	Netherlands	38.05	+0.64
10	9	I	Heather McLean	Canada	38.12	+0.71
11	7	I	Kaylin Irvine	Canada	38.24	+0.83
12	11	I	Sanneke de Neeling	Netherlands	38.25	+0.84
13	12	I	Daria Kachanova	Russia	38.39	+0.98
14	8	I	Jin Jingzhu	China	38.40	+0.99
15	10	O	Jutta Leerdam	Netherlands	38.50	+1.09
16	6	I	Kimi Goetz	United States	38.81	+1.40
17	5	I	Li Qishi	China	38.88	+1.47
18	6	O	Zhao Xin	China	39.11	+1.70
19	7	O	Natalia Czerwonka	Poland	39.31	+1.90
20	3	I	Hanna Nifantava	Belarus	39.38	+1.97
21	4	O	Huang Yu-ting	Chinese Taipei	39.39	+1.98
22	1	O	Kim Min-ji	South Korea	39.47	+2.06
23	3	O	Brianna Bocox	United States	39.67	+2.26
24	2	O	Anne Gulbrandsen	Norway	39.72	+2.31
25	4	I	Gabriele Hirschbichler	Germany	39.81	+2.40
26	1	I	María Victoria Rodríguez	Argentina	40.26	+2.85
27	2	I	Park Chae-eun	South Korea	40.41	+3.00
—	5	O	Hege Bøkko	Norway	Did not start	

=== 1000 m ===
The race was started on 24 February at 16:55.

Rank	Pair	Lane	Name	Country	Time	Diff
1	13	O	Brittany Bowe	United States	1:14.64	
2	14	I	Miho Takagi	Japan	1:14.56	+0.08
3	14	O	Nao Kodaira	Japan	1:14.96	+0.40
4	10	I	Jutta Leerdam	Netherlands	1.15.03	+0.47
5	9	O	Sanneke de Neeling	Netherlands	1.15.28	+0.48
6	10	O	Daria Kachanova	Russia	1:15.33	+0.72
7	12	I	Olga Fatkulina	Russia	1:15.62	+0.77
8	12	O	Vanessa Herzog	Austria	1.16.07	+1.06
9	7	O	Letitia de Jong	Netherlands	1:16.11	+1.51
10	11	I	Maki Tsuji	Japan	1:16.34	+1.55
11	6	O	Natalia Czerwonka	Poland	1:16.35	+1.78
12	6	I	Li Qishi	China	1:16.45	+1.79
13	11	O	Angelina Golikova	Russia	1.16.64	+1.89
14	8	O	Heather McLean	Canada	1.16.66	+2.08
15	7	I	Kimi Goetz	United States	1:16.85	+2.10
16	9	I	Kaylin Irvine	Canada	1:17.17	+2.29
17	5	O	Gabriele Hirschbichler	Germany	1:17.25	+2.61
18	5	I	Zhao Xin	China	1:17.31	+2.69
19	8	I	Jin Jingzhu	China	1:17.59	+2.75
20	4	I	Huang Yu-ting	Chinese Taipei	1:18.18	+3.03
21	4	O	Brianna Bocox	United States	1:19.24	+3.62
22	3	O	Anne Gulbrandsen	Norway	1:19.53	+4.68
23	3	I	Hanna Nifantava	Belarus	1:21.62	+4.97
24	1	O	María Victoria Rodríguez	Argentina	1:22.95	+7.06
25	13	I	Yekaterina Aydova	Kazakhstan	1:15.04	+8.39
—7	2	I	Park Chae-eun	South Korea	Did not start	
—7	2	O	Kim Min-ji	South Korea	Did not start	

=== Overall standings ===
After all races.

Rank	Name	Country	Points	Diff
1st place, gold medalist(s)	Nao Kodaira	Japan	149.665	
2nd place, silver medalist(s)	Miho Takagi	Japan	150.050	+0.77
3rd place, bronze medalist(s)	Brittany Bowe	United States	150.180	+1.03
4	Vanessa Herzog	Austria	151.045	+2.76
5	Yekaterina Aydova	Kazakhstan	151.180	+3.03
6	Sanneke de Neeling	Netherlands	151.520	+3.71
7	Daria Kachanova	Russia	151.525	+3.72
8	Angelina Golikova	Russia	151.575	+3.82
9	Olga Fatkulina	Russia	151.940	+4.55
10	Jutta Leerdam	Netherlands	152.250	+5.17
11	Maki Tsuji	Japan	152.595	+5.86
12	Heather McLean	Canada	152.665	+6.00
13	Letitia de Jong	Netherlands	152.750	+6.17
14	Kaylin Irvine	Canada	153.665	+8.00
15	Jin Jingzhu	China	153.990	+8.65
16	Li Qishi	China	154.170	+9.01
17	Kimi Goetz	United States	154.295	+9.26
18	Natalia Czerwonka	Poland	154.895	+10.46
19	Zhao Xin	China	155.490	+11.65
20	Gabriele Hirschbichler	Germany	156.320	+13.31
21	Huang Yu-ting	Chinese Taipei	156.385	+13.44
22	Brianna Bocox	United States	157.945	+16.56
23	Anne Gulbrandsen	Norway	158.615	+17.90
24	Hanna Nifantava	Belarus	159.865	+20.40
25	María Victoria Rodríguez	Argentina	163.690	+28.05
—	Kim Min-ji	South Korea	Did not finish	
—	Park Chae-eun	South Korea	Did not finish	
—	Hege Bøkko	Norway	Did not finish	
