= 2017 World Single Distances Speed Skating Championships – Women's 500 metres =

Women's 500 metres at the 2017 World Single Distances Speed Skating Championships
- Venue: Gangneung Oval
- Location: Gangneung, South Korea
- Dates: 10 February
- Competitors: 24 from 12 nations
- Winning time: 37.13

Medalists
gold medal	Nao Kodaira	Japan
silver medal	Lee Sang-hwa	South Korea
bronze medal	Yu Jing	China

The Women's 500 metres competition at the 2017 World Single Distances Speed Skating Championships was held on 10 February 2017.

== Results ==
The race was started at 17:30.

Rank	Pair	Lane	Name	Country	Time	Diff
1st place, gold medalist(s)	10	i	Nao Kodaira	Japan	37.13	
2nd place, silver medalist(s)	11	o	Lee Sang-hwa	South Korea	37.48	+0.35
3rd place, bronze medalist(s)	12	i	Yu Jing	China	37.57	+0.44
4	4	o	Karolína Erbanová	Czech Republic	37.80	+0.67
5	8	i	Heather McLean	Canada	37.86	+0.73
6	10	o	Marsha Hudey	Canada	37.89	+0.76
7	12	o	Zhang Hong	China	37.93	+0.80
8	9	o	Heather Bergsma	United States	37.93	+0.80
9	6	o	Jorien ter Mors	Netherlands	37.97	+0.84
10	7	o	Arisa Go	Japan	38.00	+0.87
11	11	i	Maki Tsuji	Japan	38.06	+0.93
12	8	o	Olga Fatkulina	Russia	38.13	+1.00
13	6	i	Nadezhda Aseeva	Russia	38.20	+1.07
14	5	o	Hege Bøkko	Norway	38.31	+1.18
15	7	i	Vanessa Herzog	Austria	38.43	+1.30
16	5	i	Kim Min-sun	South Korea	38.43	+1.30
17	9	i	Floor van den Brandt	Netherlands	38.51	+1.38
18	2	o	Park Seung-hi	South Korea	38.52	+1.39
19	1	i	Kaylin Irvine	Canada	38.54	+1.41
20	2	i	Sugar Todd	United States	38.54	+1.41
21	4	i	Angelina Golikova	Russia	38.67	+1.43
22	3	i	Anice Das	Netherlands	38.72	+1.59
23	3	o	Yekaterina Aydova	Kazakhstan	38.77	+1.64
24	1	o	Judith Dannhauer	Germany	38.85	+1.72
