= 2014–15 ISU Speed Skating World Cup – World Cup 2 – Women's 1500 metres =

The women's 1500 metres race of the 2014–15 ISU Speed Skating World Cup 2, arranged in the Taereung International Ice Rink, in Seoul, South Korea, was held on 22 November 2014.

The race was won by Marrit Leenstra of the Netherlands, while Ireen Wüst of the Netherlands in second place, and Olga Graf of Russia in third place. Noh Seon-yeong of South Korea won Division B.

== Results ==
The race took place on Saturday, 22 November, with Division B scheduled in the morning session, at 11:52, and Division A scheduled in the afternoon session, at 17:08.

=== Division A ===
Rank	Name	Nat.	Pair	Lane	Time	WC points	GWC points
1st place, gold medalist(s)	Marrit Leenstra	(Netherlands)	10	o	1:57.76	100	100
2nd place, silver medalist(s)	Ireen Wüst	(Netherlands)	10	i	1:58.33	80	80
3rd place, bronze medalist(s)	Olga Graf	(Russia)	5	o	1:59.02	70	70
4	Ida Njåtun	(Norway)	9	o	1:59.34	60	60
5	Li Qishi	(China)	5	i	1:59.48	50	50
6	Linda de Vries	(Netherlands)	8	o	1:59.75	45	—
7	Yuliya Skokova	(Russia)	9	i	1:59.85	40	
8	Marije Joling	(Netherlands)	8	i	1:59.89	36	
9	Martina Sáblíková	(Czech Republic)	7	i	2:00.98	32	
10	Luiza Złotkowska	(Poland)	6	o	2:01.11	28	
11	Kali Christ	(Canada)	3	o	2:01.33	24	
12	Melissa Wijfje	(Netherlands)	4	o	2:01.38	21	
13	Ayaka Kikuchi	(Japan)	4	i	2:01.39	18	
14	Zhao Xin	(China)	2	i	2:01.65	16	
15	Nao Kodaira	(Japan)	6	i	2:02.36	14	
16	Karolína Erbanová	(Czech Republic)	3	i	2:03.32	12	
17	Misaki Oshigiri	(Japan)	1	i	2:03.83	10	
18	Jelena Peeters	(Belgium)	1	o	2:04.05	8	
19	Nana Takagi	(Japan)	7	o	2:04.09	6	
20	Margarita Ryzhova	(Russia)	2	o	2:04.42	5	

=== Division B ===
Rank	Name	Nat.	Pair	Lane	Time	WC points
1	Noh Seon-yeong	(South Korea)	6	o	2:03.77	25
2	Gabriele Hirschbichler	(Germany)	9	i	2:04.01	19
3	Kim Bo-reum	(South Korea)	8	i	2:04.22	15
4	Katarzyna Woźniak	(Poland)	9	o	2:04.59	11
5	Park Cho-weon	(South Korea)	6	i	2:04.88	8
6	Liu Jing	(China)	7	o	2:05.13	6
7	Anna Chernova	(Russia)	3	o	2:05.442	4
8	Saori Toi	(Japan)	5	i	2:05.449	2
9	Josie Spence	(Canada)	3	i	2:06.26	1
10	Francesca Lollobrigida	(Italy)	2	o	2:06.51	—
11	Aleksandra Kachurkina	(Russia)	7	i	2:07.24	
12	Kate Hanly	(Canada)	5	o	2:07.37	
13	Jun Ye-jin	(South Korea)	4	o	2:07.75	
14	Aleksandra Goss	(Poland)	8	o	2:07.81	
15	Lauren McGuire	(Canada)	4	i	2:09.42	
16	Natálie Kerschbaummayr	(Czech Republic)	1	i	2:12.15	
17	Park Ji-woo	(South Korea)	2	i	2:53.37	
