= 2017 World Single Distances Speed Skating Championships – Women's 1000 metres =

Women's 1000 metres at the 2017 World Single Distances Speed Skating Championships
- Venue: Gangneung Oval
- Location: Gangneung, South Korea
- Dates: 11 February
- Competitors: 24 from 12 nations
- Winning time: 1:13.94

Medalists
gold medal	Heather Bergsma	United States
silver medal	Nao Kodaira	Japan
bronze medal	Jorien ter Mors	Netherlands

The Women's 1000 metres competition at the 2017 World Single Distances Speed Skating Championships was held on 11 February 2017.

== Results ==
The race was started at 19:41.

Rank	Pair	Lane	Name	Country	Time	Diff
1st place, gold medalist(s)	11	o	Heather Bergsma	United States	1:13.94	
2nd place, silver medalist(s)	10	o	Nao Kodaira	Japan	1:14.43	+0.49
3rd place, bronze medalist(s)	7	i	Jorien ter Mors	Netherlands	1:14.66	+0.72
4	12	o	Marrit Leenstra	Netherlands	1:15.06	+1.12
5	4	o	Karolína Erbanová	Czech Republic	1:15.14	+1.20
6	11	i	Miho Takagi	Japan	1:15.47	+1.53
7	12	i	Zhang Hong	China	1:15.58	+1.64
8	9	i	Hege Bøkko	Norway	1:15.58	+1.64
9	7	o	Yekaterina Lobysheva	Russia	1:16.00	+2.06
10	8	i	Yu Jing	China	1:16.01	+2.07
11	1	i	Sanneke de Neeling	Netherlands	1:16.10	+2.16
12	9	o	Arisa Go	Japan	1:16.11	+2.17
13	10	i	Olga Fatkulina	Russia	1:16.25	+2.31
14	8	o	Yekaterina Shikhova	Russia	1:16.28	+2.34
15	5	i	Natalia Czerwonka	Poland	1:16.39	+2.45
16	6	i	Yekaterina Aydova	Kazakhstan	1:16.68	+2.74
17	6	o	Gabriele Hirschbichler	Germany	1:17.11	+3.17
18	1	o	Kaylin Irvine	Canada	1:17.15	+3.21
19	2	o	Heather McLean	Canada	1:17.18	+3.24
20	4	i	Vanessa Herzog	Austria	1:17.21	+3.27
21	5	o	Ida Njåtun	Norway	1:17.48	+3.54
22	3	i	Roxanne Dufter	Germany	1:17.75	+3.81
23	3	o	Kelly Gunther	United States	1:18.38	+4.44
24	2	i	Nikola Zdráhalová	Czech Republic	1:18.52	+4.58
