= World record progression sprint combination speed skating women =

The world record progression of the women's speed skating sprint combination as recognised by the International Skating Union. The sprint combination consists of four races in one weekend: two 500 meter races and two 1000 meter races. The four races score points following the Samalog method.

#	Name	Points	Date	Venue	Meet	Ref
1	(Germany) Monika Pflug	183.085	26-27 February 1972	Eskilstuna		
2	(Canada) Sylvia Burka	175.050	13-14 January 1973	Davos		
3	(United States) Sheila Young	173.450	19-20 January 1973	Davos		
4	(Soviet Union) Tatyana Averina	168.285	28-29 March 1975	Almaty		
5	(United States) Sheila Young	166.210	12-13 March 1976	Inzell		
6	(East Germany) Christa Rothenburger	162.275	27-28 March 1981	Almaty		
7	(East Germany) Christa Rothenburger	161.120	25-26 March 1983	Almaty		
8	(East Germany) Karin Kania-Enke	160.060	22-23 February 1986	Karuizawa		
9	(United States) Bonnie Blair	159.435	25-26 February 1989	Heerenveen		
10	(United States) Bonnie Blair	159.390	18-19 January 1992	Davos		
11	(United States) Bonnie Blair	157.405	29-30 January 1994	Calgary		
12	(United States) Bonnie Blair	156.505	25-26 March 1994	Calgary		
13	(United States) Bonnie Blair	156.435	11-12 February 1995	Calgary		
14	(Canada) Catriona Le May Doan	151.690	22-23 November 1997	Calgary		
15	(Germany) Monique Garbrecht	151.605	20-21 February 1999	Calgary		
16	(Canada) Catriona Le May Doan	150.085	6-7 January 2001	Calgary		
17	(Germany) Sabine Völker	149.915	1-2 December 2001	Salt Lake City		
18	(Germany) Monique Garbrecht-Enfeldt	149.305	11-12 January 2003	Salt Lake City		
19	(Canada) Cindy Klassen	149.305	24-25 March 2006	Calgary		
20	(China) Yu Jing	148.610	28-29 January 2012	Calgary	2012 WSCh	
21	(United States) Heather Richardson	147.735	19-20 January 2013	Calgary	World Cup 6	
22	(Japan) Nao Kodaira	146.390	25-26 February 2017	Calgary	2017WSCh	
