= 2020 World Sprint Speed Skating Championships – Women =

Women at the 2020 World Sprint Speed Skating Championships
- Venue: Vikingskipet
- Location: Hamar, Norway
- Dates: 28–29 February
- Competitors: 27 from 14 nations
- Winning points: 148.870

Medalists
gold medal	Miho Takagi	Japan
silver medal	Nao Kodaira	Japan
bronze medal	Olga Fatkulina	Russia

The Women competition at the 2020 World Sprint Speed Skating Championships was held on 28 and 29 February 2020.

== Results ==
=== 500 m ===
The race started on 28 February at 17:30.

Rank	Pair	Lane	Name	Country	Time	Diff
1	8	I	Miho Takagi	Japan	37.51	
2	11	O	Nao Kodaira	Japan	37.53	+0.02
2	13	O	Vanessa Herzog	Austria	37.53	+0.02
4	12	I	Olga Fatkulina	Russia	37.72	+0.21
5	12	O	Angelina Golikova	Russia	37.77	+0.26
6	10	O	Arisa Go	Japan	37.80	+0.29
7	10	I	Daria Kachanova	Russia	37.91	+0.40
8	14	I	Kaylin Irvine	Canada	38.00	+0.49
9	7	O	Brittany Bowe	United States	38.13	+0.62
10	9	O	Heather McLean	Canada	38.15	+0.64
11	11	I	Letitia de Jong	Netherlands	38.18	+0.67
12	9	I	Jorien ter Mors	Netherlands	38.22	+0.71
13	14	O	Kimi Goetz	United States	38.24	+0.73
14	13	I	Jutta Leerdam	Netherlands	38.30	+0.79
15	8	O	Tian Ruining	China	38.30	+0.79
16	7	I	Kaja Ziomek	Poland	38.33	+0.82
17	1	I	Zhao Xin	China	38.53	+1.02
18	4	I	Li Qishi	China	38.80	+1.29
19	5	I	Hege Bøkko	Norway	39.17	+1.66
20	6	I	Andżelika Wójcik	Poland	39.33	+1.82
21	4	O	Hanna Nifantava	Belarus	39.39	+1.88
22	2	I	Huang Yu-ting	Chinese Taipei	39.49	+1.98
23	3	O	Ida Njåtun	Norway	39.58	+2.07
24	2	O	Kim Min-ji	South Korea	39.62	+2.11
25	6	O	Abigail McCluskey	Canada	39.90	+2.39
26	3	I	Katja Franzen	Germany	39.93	+2.42
27	5	O	Stien Vanhoutte	Belgium	39.97	+2.46

=== 1000 m ===
The race started on 28 February at 18.53.

Rank	Pair	Lane	Name	Country	Time	Diff
1	12	O	Miho Takagi	Japan	1:13.75	
2	13	O	Jutta Leerdam	Netherlands	1:14.54	+0.78
3	9	I	Jorien ter Mors	Netherlands	1:14.59	+0.83
4	12	I	Letitia de Jong	Netherlands	1:14.85	+1.10
5	14	O	Brittany Bowe	United States	1:15.09	+1.34
6	11	I	Olga Fatkulina	Russia	1:15.15	+1.40
7	10	O	Angelina Golikova	Russia	1:15.44	+1.69
7	14	I	Nao Kodaira	Japan	1:15.44	+1.69
9	8	I	Arisa Go	Japan	1:15.64	+1.89
10	7	O	Li Qishi	China	1:15.66	+1.91
11	13	I	Kimi Goetz	United States	1:15.84	+2.09
12	10	I	Zhao Xin	China	1:16.01	+2.26
13	11	O	Daria Kachanova	Russia	1:16.08	+2.33
14	8	O	Kaylin Irvine	Canada	1:16.28	+2.53
15	9	O	Vanessa Herzog	Austria	1:16.69	+2.94
16	2	I	Hege Bøkko	Norway	1:17.32	+3.57
17	2	O	Ida Njåtun	Norway	1:17.33	+3.58
18	4	I	Heather McLean	Canada	1:17.42	+3.67
19	6	I	Kaja Ziomek	Poland	1:18.15	+4.40
20	7	I	Huang Yu-ting	Chinese Taipei	1:18.17	+4.42
21	5	O	Abigail McCluskey	Canada	1:18.39	+4.64
22	4	O	Tian Ruining	China	1:19.04	+5.29
23	5	I	Katja Franzen	Germany	1:19.20	+5.45
24	6	O	Stien Vanhoutte	Belgium	1:19.61	+5.86
25	3	O	Hanna Nifantava	Belarus	1:19.69	+5.94
26	3	I	Kim Min-ji	South Korea	1:21.19	+7.44
27	1	I	Andżelika Wójcik	Poland	1:21.64	+7.89

=== 500 m ===
The race started on 29 February at 10:30.

Rank	Pair	Lane	Name	Country	Time	Diff
1	14	I	Nao Kodaira	Japan	37.46	
2	14	O	Miho Takagi	Japan	37.52	+0.06
3	13	I	Angelina Golikova	Russia	37.57	+0.11
4	13	O	Olga Fatkulina	Russia	37.71	+0.25
5	11	I	Brittany Bowe	United States	37.91	+0.45
6	9	O	Daria Kachanova	Russia	37.93	+0.47
7	11	O	Jutta Leerdam	Netherlands	38.03	+0.57
7	10	I	Vanessa Herzog	Austria	38.03	+0.57
9	12	I	Arisa Go	Japan	38.09	+0.63
10	10	O	Letitia de Jong	Netherlands	38.18	+0.72
11	8	O	Kaylin Irvine	Canada	38.19	+0.73
12	12	O	Jorien ter Mors	Netherlands	38.25	+0.79
13	8	I	Heather McLean	Canada	38.32	+0.86
14	9	I	Kimi Goetz	United States	38.35	+0.89
15	5	O	Kaja Ziomek	Poland	38.56	+1.10
16	7	O	Zhao Xin	China	38.57	+1.11
17	7	I	Tian Ruining	China	38.59	+1.13
18	4	O	Hege Bøkko	Norway	38.97	+1.51
19	6	O	Li Qishi	China	38.98	+1.52
20	4	I	Hanna Nifantava	Belarus	39.15	+1.69
21	2	O	Katja Franzen	Germany	39.43	+1.97
22	3	O	Huang Yu-ting	Chinese Taipei	39.47	+2.01
23	6	I	Ida Njåtun	Norway	39.57	+2.11
24	5	I	Abigail McCluskey	Canada	39.58	+2.12
25	3	I	Stien Vanhoutte	Belgium	39.74	+2.28
26	2	I	Kim Min-ji	South Korea	39.81	+2.35
27	1	O	Andżelika Wójcik	Poland	39.83	+2.37

=== 1000 m ===
The race started on 29 February at 13:08.

Rank	Pair	Lane	Name	Country	Time	Diff
1	13	I	Miho Takagi	Japan	1:13.93	
2	10	I	Jutta Leerdam	Netherlands	1:14.47	+0.54
3	11	I	Brittany Bowe	United States	1:14.56	+0.63
4	10	O	Jorien ter Mors	Netherlands	1:14.70	+0.77
5	12	O	Olga Fatkulina	Russia	1:14.85	+0.92
6	13	O	Nao Kodaira	Japan	1:14.88	+0.95
7	9	O	Letitia de Jong	Netherlands	1:14.94	+1.01
8	12	I	Angelina Golikova	Russia	1:15.27	+1.34
9	7	I	Li Qishi	China	1:15.84	+1.91
10	7	O	Zhao Xin	China	1:16.01	+2.08
11	8	O	Kimi Goetz	United States	1:16.02	+2.09
12	8	I	Kaylin Irvine	Canada	1:16.07	+2.14
13	5	I	Ida Njåtun	Norway	1:16.70	+2.77
14	4	O	Hege Bøkko	Norway	1:17.18	+3.25
15	3	I	Abigail McCluskey	Canada	1:17.25	+3.32
16	9	I	Vanessa Herzog	Austria	1:17.36	+3.43
17	11	O	Arisa Go	Japan	1:17.53	+3.60
18	6	O	Heather McLean	Canada	1:17.55	+3.62
18	6	I	Tian Ruining	China	1:17.55	+3.62
20	3	O	Huang Yu-ting	Chinese Taipei	1:17.69	+3.76
21	5	O	Kaja Ziomek	Poland	1:18.28	+4.35
22	2	O	Katja Franzen	Germany	1:19.42	+5.49
23	2	I	Stien Vanhoutte	Belgium	1:19.74	+5.81
24	4	I	Hanna Nifantava	Belarus	1:19.92	+5.99
25	1	O	Kim Min-ji	South Korea	1:21.28	+7.35
–	–		Andżelika Wójcik	Poland	Withdrawn	
–	–		Daria Kachanova	Russia	Withdrawn	

=== Overall standings ===
After all races.

Rank	Name	Country	500m	1000m	500m	1000m	Points	Diff
1st place, gold medalist(s)	Miho Takagi	Japan	37.51	1:13.75	37.52	1:13.93	148.870	
2nd place, silver medalist(s)	Nao Kodaira	Japan	37.53	1:15.44	37.46	1:14.88	150.150	+1.28
3rd place, bronze medalist(s)	Olga Fatkulina	Russia	37.72	1:15.15	37.71	1:14.85	150.430	+1.56
4	Angelina Golikova	Russia	37.77	1:15.44	37.57	1:15.27	150.695	+1.83
5	Jutta Leerdam	Netherlands	38.30	1:14.54	38.03	1:14.47	150.835	+1.97
6	Brittany Bowe	United States	38.13	1:15.09	37.91	1:14.56	150.865	+2.00
7	Jorien ter Mors	Netherlands	38.22	1:14.59	38.25	1:14.70	151.115	+2.25
8	Letitia de Jong	Netherlands	38.18	1:14.85	38.18	1:14.94	151.255	+2.39
9	Kaylin Irvine	Canada	38.00	1:16.28	38.19	1:16.07	152.365	+3.50
10	Arisa Go	Japan	37.80	1:15.64	38.09	1:17.53	152.475	+3.61
11	Kimi Goetz	United States	38.24	1:15.84	38.35	1:16.02	152.520	+3.65
12	Vanessa Herzog	Austria	37.53	1:16.69	38.03	1:17.36	152.585	+3.72
13	Zhao Xin	China	38.53	1:16.01	38.57	1:16.01	153.110	+4.24
14	Li Qishi	China	38.80	1:15.66	38.98	1:15.84	153.530	+4.66
15	Heather McLean	Canada	38.15	1:17.42	38.32	1:17.55	153.955	+5.09
16	Kaja Ziomek	Poland	38.33	1:18.15	38.56	1:18.28	155.105	+6.24
17	Tian Ruining	China	38.30	1:19.04	38.59	1:17.55	155.185	+6.32
18	Hege Bøkko	Norway	39.17	1:17.32	38.97	1:17.18	155.390	+6.52
19	Ida Njåtun	Norway	39.58	1:17.33	39.57	1:16.70	156.165	+7.30
20	Huang Yu-ting	Chinese Taipei	39.49	1:18.17	39.47	1:17.69	156.890	+8.02
21	Abigail McCluskey	Canada	39.90	1:18.39	39.58	1:17.25	157.300	+8.43
22	Hanna Nifantava	Belarus	39.39	1:19.69	39.15	1:19.92	158.345	+9.48
23	Katja Franzen	Germany	39.93	1:19.20	39.43	1:19.42	158.670	+9.80
24	Stien Vanhoutte	Belgium	39.97	1:19.61	39.74	1:19.74	159.385	+10.52
25	Kim Min-ji	South Korea	39.62	1:21.19	39.81	1:21.28	160.665	+11.80
	Daria Kachanova	Russia	37.91	1:16.08	37.93	DNS	Did not finish	
	Andżelika Wójcik	Poland	39.33	1:21.64	39.83	DNS	Did not finish	
