= 2014–15 ISU Speed Skating World Cup – World Cup 2 =

The second competition weekend of the 2014–15 ISU Speed Skating World Cup was held in the Taereung International Ice Rink in Seoul, South Korea, from Friday, 21 November, until Sunday, 23 November 2014.

Continuing his success debut of the previous weekend, Pavel Kulizhnikov of Russia won both 500 m races, and the 1000 m race. Claudia Pechstein of Germany bettered her own record as the oldest winner of a World Cup race, to 42 years and 272 days, as she won the women's 5000 m.

== Schedule ==
The detailed schedule of events:

Date	Session	Events	Comment
Friday, 21 November	Morning	10:45: 5000 m women 11:50: 500 m women (1); 12:09: 500 m men (1); 12:51: 1500 m men	Division B
Friday, 21 November	Afternoon	15:00: 5000 m women 16:10: 500 m women (1); 16:35: 500 m men (1); 17:20: 1500 m men	Division A
Saturday, 22 November	Morning	09:00: 10000 m men 10:38: 500 m women (2); 10:55: 1000 m men 11:52: 1500 m women	Division B
Saturday, 22 November	Afternoon	13:45: 10000 m men 15:51: 500 m women (2); 16:18: 1000 m men 17:08: 1500 m women	Division A
Sunday, 23 November	Morning	10:30: 1000 m women 10:58: 500 m men (2)	Division B
Sunday, 23 November	Afternoon	13:00: 1000 m women 13:45: 500 m men (2)	Division A
Sunday, 23 November	Afternoon	14:32: Mass start women 15:02: Mass start men	

All times are KST (UTC+9).

== Medal summary ==
=== Men's events ===
Event	Race #	Gold	Time	Silver	Time	Bronze	Time	Report
500 m	1	Pavel Kulizhnikov; Russia	34.94	Mo Tae-bum; South Korea	35.363	Ruslan Murashov; Russia	35.364	
500 m	2	Pavel Kulizhnikov; Russia	35.18	Mo Tae-bum; South Korea	35.32	Laurent Dubreuil; Canada	35.35	
1000 m		Pavel Kulizhnikov; Russia	1:09.56	Stefan Groothuis; Netherlands	1:09.83	Kjeld Nuis; Netherlands	1:09.86	
1500 m		Sverre Lunde Pedersen; Norway	1:47.76	Wouter olde Heuvel; Netherlands	1:48.02	Kjeld Nuis; Netherlands	1:48.30	
10000 m		Bob de Jong; Netherlands	13:17.51	Bart Swings; Belgium	13:32.45	Aleksandr Rumyantsev; Russia	13:37.59	
Mass start		Andrea Giovannini; Italy	70 ^{A}	Haralds Silovs; Latvia	40 ^{A}	Lee Seung-hoon; South Korea	20 ^{A}	

^{A} In mass start, race points are accumulated during the race. The skater with most race points is the winner.

=== Women's events ===
Event	Race #	Gold	Time	Silver	Time	Bronze	Time	Report
500 m	1	Nao Kodaira; Japan	38.05	Lee Sang-hwa; South Korea	38.18	Judith Hesse; Germany	38.95	
500 m	2	Lee Sang-hwa; South Korea	37.99	Nao Kodaira; Japan	38.51	Karolína Erbanová; Czech Republic	38.83	
1000 m		Li Qishi; China	1:16.95	Marrit Leenstra; Netherlands	1:17.06	Karolína Erbanová; Czech Republic	1:17.33	
1500 m		Marrit Leenstra; Netherlands	1:57.76	Ireen Wüst; Netherlands	1:58.33	Olga Graf; Russia	1:59.02	
5000 m		Claudia Pechstein; Germany	7:07.77	Martina Sáblíková; Czech Republic	7:13.08	Ivanie Blondin; Canada	7:14.53	
Mass start		Martina Sáblíková; Czech Republic	66 ^{A}	Irene Schouten; Netherlands	40 ^{A}	Ivanie Blondin; Canada	20 ^{A}	

^{A} In mass start, race points are accumulated during the race. The skater with most race points is the winner.
