= 2014–15 ISU Speed Skating World Cup – World Cup 2 – Women's mass start =

The women's mass start race of the 2014–15 ISU Speed Skating World Cup 2, arranged in the Taereung International Ice Rink, in Seoul, South Korea, was held on 23 November 2014.

Martina Sáblíková of the Czech Republic won the race, while Irene Schouten of the Netherlands came second, and Ivanie Blondin of Canada came third.

== Results ==
The race took place on Sunday, 23 November, scheduled in the afternoon session, at 14:32.

				Race points							
Rank	Name	Nat.	Laps	Split 1	Split 2	Split 3	Finish	Total	Time	WC points	GWC points
1st place, gold medalist(s)	Martina Sáblíková	(Czech Republic)	16	1		5	60	66	7:42.96	100	100
2nd place, silver medalist(s)	Irene Schouten	(Netherlands)	16				40	40	7:45.05	80	80
3rd place, bronze medalist(s)	Ivanie Blondin	(Canada)	16				20	20	7:45.06	70	70
4	Rixt Meijer	(Netherlands)	16	5	3			8	7:53.13	60	60
5	Jelena Peeters	(Belgium)	16		5			5	8:14.10	50	50
6	Claudia Pechstein	(Germany)	16			3		3	7:45.95	45	—
7	Vanessa Bittner	(Austria)	16	3				3	8:00.93	40	
8	Jun Ye-jin	(South Korea)	16			1		1	7:52.68	36	
9	Kim Bo-reum	(South Korea)	16					0	7:45.98	32	
10	Francesca Lollobrigida	(Italy)	16					0	7:48.16	28	
11	Nana Takagi	(Japan)	16					0	7:49.69	24	
12	Miho Takagi	(Japan)	16					0	7:52.86	21	
13	Natalya Voronina	(Russia)	16					0	7:52.94	18	
14	Maria Lamb	(United States)	16					0	7:53.00	16	
15	Kali Christ	(Canada)	16					0	7:53.04	14	
16	Nikola Zdráhalová	(Czech Republic)	16					0	7:53.31	12	
17	Aleksandra Goss	(Poland)	16					0	7:53.55	10	
18	Liu Jing	(China)	16					0	7:53.97	8	
19	Urszula Włodarczyk	(Poland)	16					0	8:01.72	6	
20	Gabriele Hirschbichler	(Germany)	16					0	8:08.61	5	
21	Zhang Xin	(China)	15		1			0	7:51.87	4	
22	Yvonne Daldossi	(Italy)	9					0	4:38.07	3	
