= 2014–15 ISU Speed Skating World Cup – World Cup 2 – Men's 1500 metres =

The men's 1500 metres race of the 2014–15 ISU Speed Skating World Cup 2, arranged in the Taereung International Ice Rink, in Seoul, South Korea, was held on 21 November 2014.

The race was won by Sverre Lunde Pedersen of Norway, while Wouter olde Heuvel of the Netherlands in second place, and Kjeld Nuis of the Netherlands in third place. Kim Jin-su of South Korea won Division B.

== Results ==
The race took place on Friday, 21 November, with Division B scheduled in the morning session, at 12:51, and Division A scheduled in the afternoon session, at 17:20.

=== Division A ===
Rank	Name	Nat.	Pair	Lane	Time	WC points	GWC points
1st place, gold medalist(s)	Sverre Lunde Pedersen	(Norway)	6	o	1:47.76	100	100
2nd place, silver medalist(s)	Wouter olde Heuvel	(Netherlands)	10	o	1:48.02	80	80
3rd place, bronze medalist(s)	Kjeld Nuis	(Netherlands)	10	i	1:48.30	70	70
4	Denny Morrison	(Canada)	9	o	1:48.30	60	60
5	Koen Verweij	(Netherlands)	9	i	1:48.40	50	50
6	Shani Davis	(United States)	8	i	1:48.49	45	—
7	Sven Kramer	(Netherlands)	7	o	1:48.51	40	
8	Konrad Niedźwiedzki	(Poland)	8	o	1:48.82	36	
9	Zbigniew Bródka	(Poland)	3	o	1:49.04	32	
10	Thomas Krol	(Norway)	6	i	1:49.13	28	
11	Bart Swings	(Belgium)	4	i	1:49.21	24	
12	Jan Szymański	(Poland)	7	i	1:49.66	21	
13	Li Bailin	(China)	5	i	1:50.10	18	
14	Lee Seung-hoon	(South Korea)	4	o	1:50.15	16	
15	Bram Smallenbroek	(Austria)	1	o	1:50.37	14	
16	Kim Min-seok	(South Korea)	1	i	1:50.89	12	
17	Denis Kuzin	(Kazakhstan)	2	o	1:51.24	10	
18	Alec Janssens	(Canada)	2	i	1:51.30	8	
19	Pavel Kulizhnikov	(Russia)	5	o	1:52.50	6	
20	Mikhail Kozlov	(Russia)	3	i	1:52.52	5	

=== Division B ===
Rank	Name	Nat.	Pair	Lane	Time	WC points
1	Kim Jin-su	(South Korea)	10	i	1:49.99	25
2	Aleksey Suvorov	(Russia)	11	o	1:50.62	19
3	Sergey Gryaztsov	(Canada)	11	i	1:50.81	15
4	Konrád Nagy	(Hungary)	12	o	1:50.82	11
5	Jeffrey Swider-Peltz	(United States)	13	i	1:51.17	8
6	Kirill Golubev	(Russia)	9	o	1:51.31	6
7	Håvard Holmefjord Lorentzen	(Norway)	12	i	1:51.330	4
8	Roland Cieslak	(Poland)	6	i	1:51.331	2
9	Kim Cheol-min	(South Korea)	4	o	1:51.44	1
10	Liu Yiming	(China)	9	i	1:51.77	—
11	Vincent De Haître	(Canada)	10	o	1:51.85	
12	Denis Dressel	(Germany)	8	i	1:52.01	
13	Andrea Giovannini	(Italy)	5	i	1:52.31	
14	Benjamin Macé	(France)	13	o	1:52.43	
15	Tyler Derraugh	(Canada)	6	o	1:52.50	
16	Shane Williamson	(Japan)	8	o	1:52.52	
17	Edwin Park	(United States)	3	o	1:52.56	
18	Luca Stefani	(Italy)	7	o	1:53.01	
19	Linus Heidegger	(Austria)	2	o	1:53.102	
20	Ha Hong-sun	(South Korea)	2	i	1:53.105	
21	Fyodor Mezentsev	(Kazakhstan)	3	i	1:53.18	
22	Maksim Baklashkin	(Kazakhstan)	7	i	1:53.55	
23	Aleksandr Zhigin	(Kazakhstan)	5	o	1:54.23	
24	Nicola Tumolero	(Italy)	1	i	1:57.88	
25	Daichi Yamanaka	(Japan)	4	i	1:58.46	
