= 2014–15 ISU Speed Skating World Cup – World Cup 2 – Men's mass start =

The men's mass start race of the 2014–15 ISU Speed Skating World Cup 2, arranged in the Taereung International Ice Rink, in Seoul, South Korea, was held on 23 November 2014.

Andrea Giovannini of Italy won the race, while Haralds Silovs of Latvia came second, and Lee Seung-hoon of South Korea came third.

== Results ==
The race took place on Sunday, 23 November, scheduled in the afternoon session, at 15:02.

| | | | | Race points | | | | | | | |
| Rank | Name | Nat. | Laps | Split 1 | Split 2 | Split 3 | Finish | Total | Time | WC points | GWC points |
|---|---|---|---|---|---|---|---|---|---|---|---|
| 1st place, gold medalist(s) | Andrea Giovannini | (Italy) | 16 | | 5 | 5 | 60 | 70 | 8:10.78 | 100 | 100 |
| 2nd place, silver medalist(s) | Haralds Silovs | (Latvia) | 16 | | | | 40 | 40 | 8:12.35 | 80 | 80 |
| 3rd place, bronze medalist(s) | Lee Seung-hoon | (South Korea) | 16 | | | | 20 | 20 | 8:12.56 | 70 | 70 |
| 4 | Linus Heidegger | (Austria) | 16 | 3 | 1 | 3 | | 7 | 8:20.85 | 60 | 60 |
| 5 | Bram Smallenbroek | (Austria) | 16 | 5 | | | | 5 | 8:45.19 | 50 | 50 |
| 6 | Ryosuke Tsuchiya | (Japan) | 16 | | 3 | | | 3 | 8:27.17 | 45 | — |
| 7 | Roland Cieslak | (Poland) | 16 | 1 | | 1 | | 2 | 8:23.08 | 40 | |
| 8 | Kim Cheol-min | (South Korea) | 16 | | | | | 0 | 8:14.49 | 36 | |
| 9 | Sverre Lunde Pedersen | (Norway) | 16 | | | | | 0 | 8:15.33 | 32 | |
| 10 | Jeffrey Swider-Peltz | (United States) | 16 | | | | | 0 | 8:15.50 | 28 | |
| 11 | Gerben Jorritsma | (Netherlands) | 16 | | | | | 0 | 8:15.59 | 24 | |
| 12 | Shane Williamson | (Japan) | 16 | | | | | 0 | 8:16.64 | 21 | |
| 13 | Yevgeny Seryaev | (Russia) | 16 | | | | | 0 | 8:16.88 | 18 | |
| 14 | Tyler Derraugh | (Canada) | 16 | | | | | 0 | 8:17.09 | 16 | |
| 15 | Alexej Baumgärtner | (Germany) | 16 | | | | | 0 | 8:21.31 | 14 | |
| 16 | Li Bailin | (China) | 16 | | | | | 0 | 8:27.11 | 12 | |
| 17 | Håvard Holmefjord Lorentzen | (Norway) | 16 | | | | | 0 | 8:27.12 | 10 | |
| 18 | Martin Hänggi | (Switzerland) | 16 | | | | | 0 | 8:27.23 | 8 | |
| 19 | Nicola Tumolero | (Italy) | 16 | | | | | 0 | 8:27.84 | 6 | |
| 20 | Danila Semerikov | (Russia) | 16 | | | | | 0 | 8:34.10 | 5 | |
| 21 | Koen Verweij | (Netherlands) | 16 | | | | | 0 | 8:36.37 | 4 | |
| 22 | Bart Swings | (Belgium) | 16 | | | | | 0 | 8:39.46 | 3 | |
| 23 | Edwin Park | (United States) | 16 | | | | | 0 | 8:42.40 | 2 | |
| 24 | Robert Watson | (Canada) | 14 | | | | | 0 | 8:29.12 | 1 | |
| 25 | Patrick Beckert | (Germany) | 14 | | | | | 0 | 8:34.04 | — | |
| 26 | Rehanbai Talabuhan | (China) | 14 | | | | | 0 | 8:39.98 | | |
