= 2014–15 ISU Speed Skating World Cup – World Cup 2 – Men's 1000 metres =

The men's 1000 metres race of the 2014–15 ISU Speed Skating World Cup 2, arranged in the Taereung International Ice Rink, in Seoul, South Korea, was held on 22 November 2014.

The race was won by Pavel Kulizhnikov of Russia, while Stefan Groothuis of the Netherlands in second place, and Kjeld Nuis of the Netherlands in third place. Kim Jin-su of South Korea won Division B.

== Results ==
The race took place on Saturday, 22 November, with Division B scheduled in the morning session, at 10:55, and Division A scheduled in the afternoon session, at 16:18.

=== Division A ===
Rank	Name	Nat.	Pair	Lane	Time	WC points	GWC points
1st place, gold medalist(s)	Pavel Kulizhnikov	(Russia)	10	i	1:09.56	100	100
2nd place, silver medalist(s)	Stefan Groothuis	(Netherlands)	6	i	1:09.83	80	80
3rd place, bronze medalist(s)	Kjeld Nuis	(Netherlands)	10	o	1:09.86	70	70
4	Kai Verbij	(Netherlands)	4	i	1:10.24	60	60
5	Shani Davis	(United States)	8	i	1:10.29	50	50
6	Samuel Schwarz	(Germany)	9	i	1:10.72	45	—
7	Koen Verweij	(Netherlands)	8	o	1:10.84	40	
8	Nico Ihle	(Germany)	6	o	1:10.89	36	
9	Yang Fan	(China)	5	i	1:10.90	32	
10	Richard Maclennan	(Canada)	3	o	1:11.09	28	
11	Aleksey Yesin	(Russia)	2	o	1:11.13	24	
12	Konrad Niedźwiedzki	(Poland)	4	o	1:11.17	21	
13	Ha Hong-sun	(South Korea)	1	o	1:11.43	18	
14	Hein Otterspeer	(Netherlands)	7	o	1:11.44	16	
15	Kirill Golubev	(Russia)	2	i	1:11.50	14	
16	Håvard Holmefjord Lorentzen	(Norway)	3	i	1:11.61	12	
17	Li Bailin	(China)	1	i	1:11.64	10	
18	Denis Kuzin	(Kazakhstan)	5	o	1:11.69	8	
19	Vincent De Haître	(Canada)	9	o	1:12.20	6	
20	Denny Morrison	(Canada)	7	i	DQ		

=== Division B ===
Rank	Name	Nat.	Pair	Lane	Time	WC points
1	Kim Jin-su	(South Korea)	9	i	1:10.65	25
2	Mo Tae-bum	(South Korea)	4	o	1:10.93	19
3	Zbigniew Bródka	(Poland)	12	i	1:11.16	15
4	Tyler Derraugh	(Canada)	9	o	1:11.80	11
5	Denis Dressel	(Germany)	10	i	1:12.03	8
6	Armin Hager	(Austria)	8	i	1:12.202	6
7	Shunsuke Nakamura	(Japan)	7	i	1:12.204	4
8	Mikhail Kozlov	(Russia)	6	o	1:12.32	2
9	Mirko Giacomo Nenzi	(Italy)	12	o	1:12.39	1
10	Lee Kang-seok	(South Korea)	2	o	1:12.48	—
11	Jeffrey Swider-Peltz	(United States)	11	o	1:12.62	
12	Artur Nogal	(Poland)	10	o	1:12.63	
13	Kim Jun-ho	(South Korea)	8	o	1:12.74	
14	Konrád Nagy	(Hungary)	5	i	1:12.95	
15	Espen Aarnes Hvammen	(Norway)	3	o	1:13.05	
16	Yuto Fujino	(Japan)	7	o	1:13.46	
17	Aleksandr Zhigin	(Kazakhstan)	5	o	1:13.54	
18	Edwin Park	(United States)	1	o	1:13.69	
19	Tsubasa Hasegawa	(Japan)	1	i	1:13.74	
20	Benjamin Macé	(France)	11	i	1:13.78	
21	Maksim Baklashkin	(Kazakhstan)	4	i	1:13.79	
22	Bram Smallenbroek	(Austria)	6	i	1:13.90	
23	Sung Ching-Yang	(Chinese Taipei)	2	i	1:14.65	
24	David Bosa	(Italy)	3	i	1:15.07	
