= Speed skating at the 2018 Winter Olympics – Women's 500 metres =

Women's 500 metres at the XXIII Olympic Winter Games
- Venue: Gangneung Oval, Gangneung, South Korea
- Date: 18 February 2018
- Competitors: 31 from 18 nations
- Winning time: 36.94 OR

Medalists
1st place, gold medalist(s)		Nao Kodaira	Japan
2nd place, silver medalist(s)		Lee Sang-hwa	South Korea
3rd place, bronze medalist(s)		Karolína Erbanová	Czech Republic

The women's 500 metres speed skating competition of the 2018 Winter Olympics was held on 18 February 2018 at Gangneung Oval in Gangneung.

== Summary ==
Pre-race favourites were Nao Kodaira, winner of every single pre-Olympic ISU World Cup 500m in the 2017/18 season, and Lee Sang-hwa, world record holder at this distance and two-time Olympic 500m gold medallist.

Skating in the fourth pair, Jorien Ter Mors posted a time of 37.53, which stood until Brittany Bowe improved it by 0.009 seconds in the eleventh pair. Starting in pair 16 versus Karolína Erbanová, Japan's Nao Kodaira raced to an Olympic and sea-level record of 36.94, clocking an unprecedented lap time of 26.68 - a pace for the longest time deemed "impossible" even at altitude (which Gangneung is not). In pair 15, South Korea's Lee Sang-hwa opened faster than Kodaira and was up two tenths in back straight intermediate timings. However, an imperfect final inner turn saw her lose this advantage and cross the line 0.39 seconds down in 37.33 to take second place - a mere 0.01 seconds ahead of Erbanová's time. Vanessa Herzog, 500m gold medallist at the 2018 European Speed Skating Championships, was unable to challenge for a medal in the final pair, finishing fourth.

== Competition schedule ==
All times are (UTC+9).

Date	Time	Event
18 February	20:56	Women's 500m Final

== Records ==
Prior to this competition, the existing world, Olympic and track records were as follows.

World record	Lee Sang-hwa (KOR)	36.36	Salt Lake City, United States	16 November 2013
Olympic record	Lee Sang-hwa (KOR)	37.28	Sochi, Russia	11 February 2014
Track record	Nao Kodaira (JPN)	37.05		7 February 2018

The following records were set during this competition.

Date	Round	Athlete	Country	Time	Record
18 February	Pair 14	Nao Kodaira	Japan	36.94	OR, WB (sea level), TR

OR = Olympic record, TR = track record, WB = world best

== Results ==
The races were held at 20:56.

Rank	Pair	Lane	Name	Country	Time	Time behind	Notes
1st place, gold medalist(s)	14	I	Nao Kodaira	Japan	36.94	—	OR, TR
2nd place, silver medalist(s)	15	O	Lee Sang-hwa	South Korea	37.33	+0.39	
3rd place, bronze medalist(s)	14	O	Karolína Erbanová	Czech Republic	37.34	+0.40	
4	16	I	Vanessa Herzog	Austria	37.51	+0.57	
5	11	O	Brittany Bowe	United States	37.530	+0.59	
6	4	I	Jorien ter Mors	Netherlands	37.539	+0.59	
7	16	O	Angelina Golikova	Olympic Athletes from Russia	37.62	+0.68	
8	15	I	Arisa Go	Japan	37.67	+0.73	
9	13	I	Yu Jing	China	37.81	+0.87	
10	13	O	Marsha Hudey	Canada	37.88	+0.94	
11	9	O	Heather Bergsma	United States	38.13	+1.19	
12	10	O	Kim Hyun-yung	South Korea	38.251	+1.31	
13	11	I	Erina Kamiya	Japan	38.255	+1.31	
14	12	O	Heather McLean	Canada	38.29	+1.35	
15	8	I	Zhang Hong	China	38.39	+1.45	
16	10	I	Judith Dannhauer	Germany	38.534	+1.59	
16	9	I	Kim Min-sun	South Korea	38.534	+1.59	
18	12	I	Hege Bøkko	Norway	38.538	+1.59	
19	1	I	Anice Das	Netherlands	38.75	+1.81	
20	5	O	Tian Ruining	China	38.86	+1.92	
21	8	O	Yekaterina Aydova	Kazakhstan	38.96	+2.02	
22	6	O	Huang Yu-ting	Chinese Taipei	38.98	+2.04	
23	3	I	Lotte van Beek	Netherlands	39.18	+2.24	
24	2	O	Erin Jackson	United States	39.20	+2.26	
25	4	O	Kaja Ziomek	Poland	39.26	+2.32	
26	7	I	Yvonne Daldossi	Italy	39.28	+2.34	
27	2	I	Ida Njåtun	Norway	39.33	+2.39	
28	7	O	Elina Risku	Finland	39.36	+2.42	
29	6	I	Francesca Bettrone	Italy	39.52	+2.58	
30	5	I	Kseniya Sadouskaya	Belarus	39.64	+2.70	
31	3	O	Alexandra Ianculescu	Romania	40.70	+3.76	
