= 2014–15 ISU Speed Skating World Cup – World Cup 2 – Men's 500 metres =

Skating sports event

The men's 500 metres races of the 2014–15 ISU Speed Skating World Cup 2, arranged in the Taereung International Ice Rink, in Seoul, South Korea, were held on the weekend of 21–23 November 2014.

Race one was won by Pavel Kulizhnikov of Russia, while Mo Tae-bum of South Korea came second, and Ruslan Murashov of Russia came third. Dai Dai Ntab of the Netherlands won Division B of race one, and was thus, under the rules, automatically promoted to Division A for race two.

In race two, the top two were the same as in race one, Kulizhnikov and Mo, while Laurent Dubreuil of Canada took the bronze. Pim Schipper of the Netherlands won Division B of race two.

== Race 1 ==
Race one took place on Friday, 21 November, with Division B scheduled in the morning session, at 12:09, and Division A scheduled in the afternoon session, at 16:35.

=== Division A ===
| Rank | Name | Nat. | Pair | Lane | Time | WC points | GWC points |
|---|---|---|---|---|---|---|---|
| 1st place, gold medalist(s) | Pavel Kulizhnikov | (Russia) | 10 | i | 34.94 | 100 | 50 |
| 2nd place, silver medalist(s) | Mo Tae-bum | (South Korea) | 6 | i | 35.363 | 80 | 40 |
| 3rd place, bronze medalist(s) | Ruslan Murashov | (Russia) | 9 | i | 35.364 | 70 | 35 |
| 4 | Nico Ihle | (Germany) | 8 | o | 35.42 | 60 | 30 |
| 5 | Espen Aarnes Hvammen | (Norway) | 7 | o | 35.43 | 50 | 25 |
| 6 | Hein Otterspeer | (Netherlands) | 7 | i | 35.50 | 45 | — |
| 7 | Laurent Dubreuil | (Canada) | 8 | i | 35.51 | 40 | |
| 8 | Denis Koval | (Russia) | 6 | o | 35.52 | 36 | |
| 9 | Gilmore Junio | (Canada) | 4 | i | 35.58 | 32 | |
| 10 | Jan Smeekens | (Netherlands) | 10 | o | 35.604 | 28 | |
| 11 | Gerben Jorritsma | (Netherlands) | 2 | o | 35.609 | 24 | |
| 12 | Lee Kang-seok | (South Korea) | 1 | i | 35.65 | 21 | |
| 13 | Kim Jun-ho | (South Korea) | 2 | i | 35.69 | 18 | |
| 14 | Aleksey Yesin | (Russia) | 4 | o | 35.70 | 16 | |
| 15 | Mu Zhongsheng | (China) | 1 | o | 35.77 | 14 | |
| 16 | Yūya Oikawa | (Japan) | 5 | o | 35.79 | 12 | |
| 17 | William Dutton | (Canada) | 3 | o | 35.89 | 10 | |
| 18 | Artyom Kuznetsov | (Russia) | 3 | i | 35.95 | 8 | |
| 19 | Keiichiro Nagashima | (Japan) | 5 | i | 36.01 | 6 | |
| 20 | Ryohei Haga | (Japan) | 9 | o | 36.02 | 5 | |

=== Division B ===
| Rank | Name | Nat. | Pair | Lane | Time | WC points |
|---|---|---|---|---|---|---|
| 1 | Dai Dai Ntab | (Netherlands) | 2 | o | 35.81 | 25 |
| 2 | Pim Schipper | (Netherlands) | 11 | o | 35.89 | 19 |
| 3 | Richard Maclennan | (Canada) | 9 | o | 35.93 | 15 |
| 4 | Tsubasa Hasegawa | (Japan) | 9 | i | 35.98 | 11 |
| 5 | Denny Ihle | (Germany) | 8 | o | 35.99 | 8 |
| 6 | Samuel Schwarz | (Germany) | 6 | o | 36.05 | 6 |
| 7 | David Bosa | (Italy) | 5 | o | 36.07 | 4 |
| 8 | Xie Jiaxuan | (China) | 7 | i | 36.09 | 2 |
| 9 | Mirko Giacomo Nenzi | (Italy) | 11 | i | 36.10 | 1 |
| 10 | Artur Nogal | (Poland) | 10 | o | 36.14 | — |
| 11 | Denis Dressel | (Germany) | 5 | i | 36.17 | |
| 12 | Wang Nan | (China) | 7 | o | 36.23 | |
| 13 | Shani Davis | (United States) | 8 | i | 36.24 | |
| 14 | Daichi Yamanaka | (Japan) | 10 | i | 36.37 | |
| 15 | Vincent De Haître | (Canada) | 6 | i | 36.44 | |
| 16 | Sung Ching-Yang | (Chinese Taipei) | 3 | i | 36.45 | |
| 17 | Fyodor Mezentsev | (Kazakhstan) | 4 | i | 36.47 | |
| 18 | Piotr Michalski | (Poland) | 4 | o | 36.50 | |
| 19 | Yang Seung-yong | (South Korea) | 1 | i | 36.52 | |
| 20 | Luca Zanghellini | (Italy) | 3 | o | 36.70 | |
| 21 | Armin Hager | (Austria) | 2 | i | 37.06 | |

== Race 2 ==
Race two took place on Sunday, 23 November, with Division B scheduled in the morning session, at 10:58, and Division A scheduled in the afternoon session, at 13:45.

=== Division A ===
| Rank | Name | Nat. | Pair | Lane | Time | WC points | GWC points |
|---|---|---|---|---|---|---|---|
| 1st place, gold medalist(s) | Pavel Kulizhnikov | (Russia) | 11 | o | 35.18 | 100 | 50 |
| 2nd place, silver medalist(s) | Mo Tae-bum | (South Korea) | 10 | o | 35.32 | 80 | 40 |
| 3rd place, bronze medalist(s) | Laurent Dubreuil | (Canada) | 7 | o | 35.35 | 70 | 35 |
| 4 | Jan Smeekens | (Netherlands) | 8 | i | 35.39 | 60 | 30 |
| 5 | Ruslan Murashov | (Russia) | 9 | o | 35.44 | 50 | 25 |
| 6 | Kim Jun-ho | (South Korea) | 4 | o | 35.48 | 45 | — |
| 7 | Nico Ihle | (Germany) | 11 | i | 35.57 | 40 | |
| 8 | Gilmore Junio | (Canada) | 6 | o | 35.59 | 36 | |
| 9 | Dai Dai Ntab | (Netherlands) | 3 | i | 35.61 | 32 | |
| 10 | Artyom Kuznetsov | (Russia) | 3 | o | 35.63 | 28 | |
| 11 | Hein Otterspeer | (Netherlands) | 8 | o | 35.64 | 24 | |
| 12 | Espen Aarnes Hvammen | (Norway) | 10 | i | 35.67 | 21 | |
| 13 | Gerben Jorritsma | (Netherlands) | 7 | i | 35.69 | 18 | |
| 14 | Keiichiro Nagashima | (Japan) | 2 | o | 35.712 | 16 | |
| 15 | Aleksey Yesin | (Russia) | 6 | i | 35.716 | 14 | |
| 16 | Denis Koval | (Russia) | 9 | i | 35.72 | 12 | |
| 17 | Yūya Oikawa | (Japan) | 4 | i | 35.81 | 10 | |
| 18 | Ryohei Haga | (Japan) | 1 | i | 35.83 | 8 | |
| 19 | Lee Kang-seok | (South Korea) | 5 | o | 35.86 | 6 | |
| 20 | Mu Zhongsheng | (China) | 5 | i | 35.87 | 5 | |
| 21 | William Dutton | (Canada) | 2 | i | 35.94 | 4 | |

=== Division B ===
| Rank | Name | Nat. | Pair | Lane | Time | WC points |
|---|---|---|---|---|---|---|
| 1 | Pim Schipper | (Netherlands) | 9 | i | 35.66 | 25 |
| 2 | Mirko Giacomo Nenzi | (Italy) | 7 | o | 35.93 | 19 |
| 3 | Denny Ihle | (Germany) | 7 | i | 35.94 | 15 |
| 4 | Wang Nan | (China) | 4 | i | 35.96 | 11 |
| 5 | Artur Nogal | (Poland) | 5 | i | 35.99 | 8 |
| 6 | Xie Jiaxuan | (China) | 8 | o | 36.01 | 6 |
| 7 | Tsubasa Hasegawa | (Japan) | 9 | o | 36.04 | 4 |
| 8 | Richard Maclennan | (Canada) | 8 | i | 36.14 | 2 |
| 9 | Piotr Michalski | (Poland) | 3 | i | 36.30 | 1 |
| 10 | Yang Seung-yong | (South Korea) | 1 | o | 36.33 | — |
| 11 | Vincent De Haître | (Canada) | 3 | o | 36.352 | |
| 12 | David Bosa | (Italy) | 6 | i | 36.357 | |
| 13 | Shani Davis | (United States) | 5 | o | 36.39 | |
| 14 | Shunsuke Nakamura | (Japan) | 4 | o | 36.61 | |
| 15 | Sung Ching-Yang | (Chinese Taipei) | 2 | o | 36.65 | |
| 16 | Luca Zanghellini | (Italy) | 2 | i | 36.88 | |
| 17 | Denis Dressel | (Germany) | 6 | o | 36.97 | |
| 18 | Aleksandr Zhigin | (Kazakhstan) | 1 | i | 37.10 | |
