= 2016 World Single Distances Speed Skating Championships – Women's 1500 metres =

Women's 1500 metres at the 2016 World Single Distances Speed Skating Championships
- Venue: Kolomna Speed Skating Center, Kolomna
- Date: 14 February
- Competitors: 24 from 11 nations
- Winning time: 1:53.92

Medalists
gold medal	Jorien ter Mors	Netherlands
silver medal	Heather Richardson-Bergsma	United States
bronze medal	Brittany Bowe	United States

The women's 1500 metres race of the 2016 World Single Distances Speed Skating Championships was held on 14 February 2016.

== Results ==
The race was started at 15:14.

Rank	Pair	Lane	Name	Country	Time	Diff
1st place, gold medalist(s)	1	o	Jorien ter Mors	NED	1:53.92	
2nd place, silver medalist(s)	11	o	Heather Richardson-Bergsma	USA	1:54.67	+0.75
3rd place, bronze medalist(s)	11	i	Brittany Bowe	USA	1:55.09	+1.17
4	2	i	Ireen Wüst	NED	1:55.93	+2.01
5	12	o	Martina Sáblíková	CZE	1:56.06	+2.14
6	12	i	Marrit Leenstra	NED	1:56.25	+2.33
7	4	o	Olga Graf	RUS	1:56.52	+2.60
8	10	i	Miho Takagi	JPN	1:56.83	+2.91
9	8	o	Vanessa Bittner	AUT	1:57.22	+3.30
10	9	i	Ida Njåtun	NOR	1:57.25	+3.33
11	9	o	Misaki Oshigiri	JPN	1:57.56	+3.64
12	8	i	Natalia Czerwonka	POL	1:58.19	+4.27
13	6	i	Hao Jiachen	CHN	1:58.67	+4.75
14	5	i	Kali Christ	CAN	1:58.78	+4.86
15	7	i	Yekaterina Shikhova	RUS	1:59.21	+5.29
16	10	o	Ayaka Kikuchi	JPN	1:59.23	+5.31
17	5	o	Gabriele Hirschbichler	GER	1:59.28	+5.36
18	2	o	Liu Jing	CHN	1:59.30	+5.38
19	7	o	Elizaveta Kazelina	RUS	1:59.36	+5.44
20	3	o	Hege Bøkko	NOR	1:59.38	+5.46
21	4	i	Brianne Tutt	CAN	1:59.45	+5.53
22	6	o	Roxanne Dufter	GER	2:00.17	+6.25
23	3	i	Zhao Xin	CHN	2:02.07	+8.15
24	1	i	Josie Spence	CAN	2:03.33	+9.41
