= Anne Gulbrandsen =

Norwegian speed skater

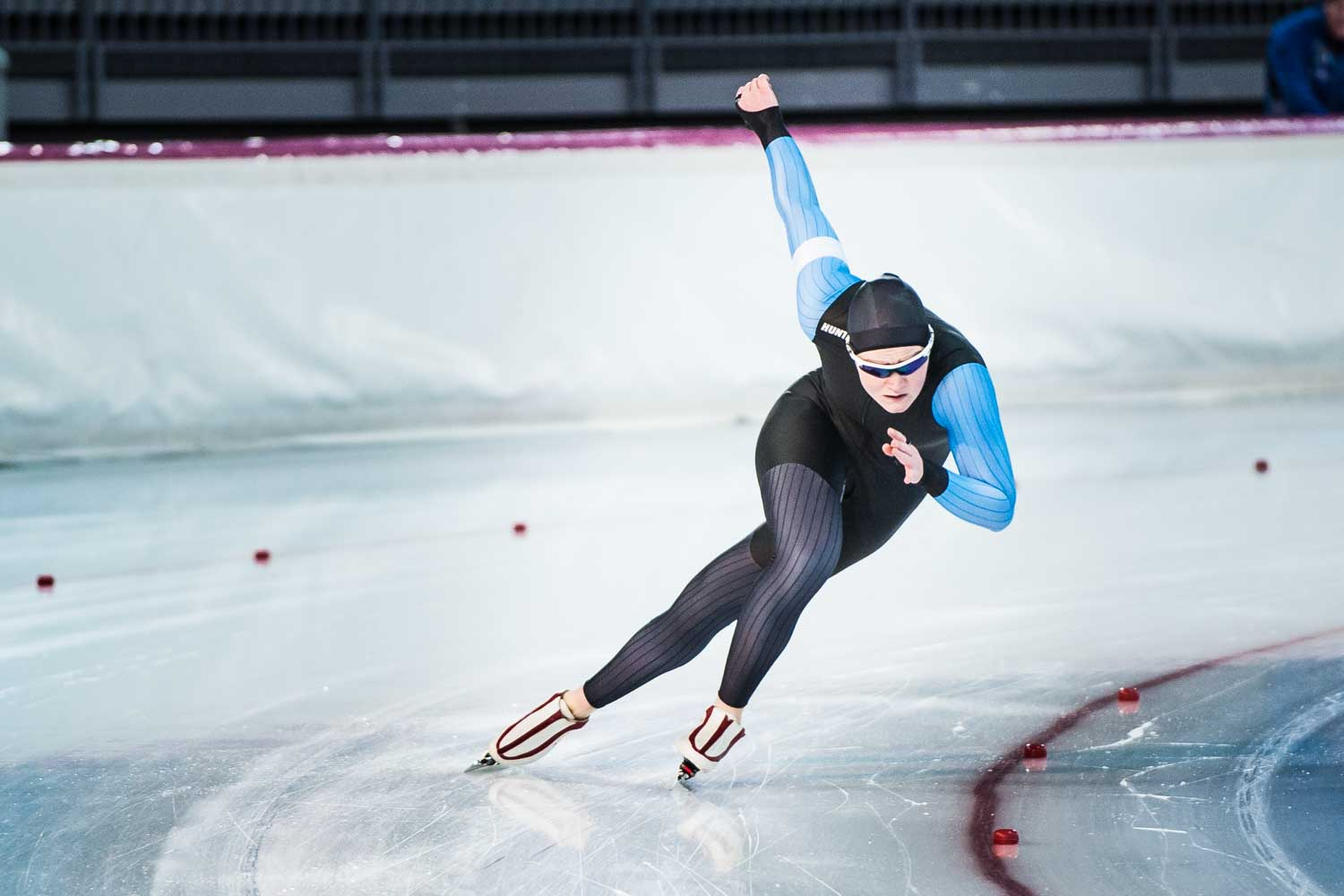
- Gulbrandsen in 2016

Personal information
- Nationality: Norwegian
- Born: 17 February 1994 (age 32)

Sport
- Country: Norway
- Sport: Speed skating
Medal record
European Championships
Bronze medal – third place	2018 Kolomna	Team sprint

Anne Gulbrandsen (born 17 February 1994) is a Norwegian speed skater. She won a bronze medal in team sprint at the 2018 European Speed Skating Championships in Kolomna, Russia, along with Martine Ripsrud and Sofie Karoline Haugen. She competed at the World Sprint Speed Skating Championships in 2018.
