= 2017 World Sprint Speed Skating Championships =

International speed skating competition

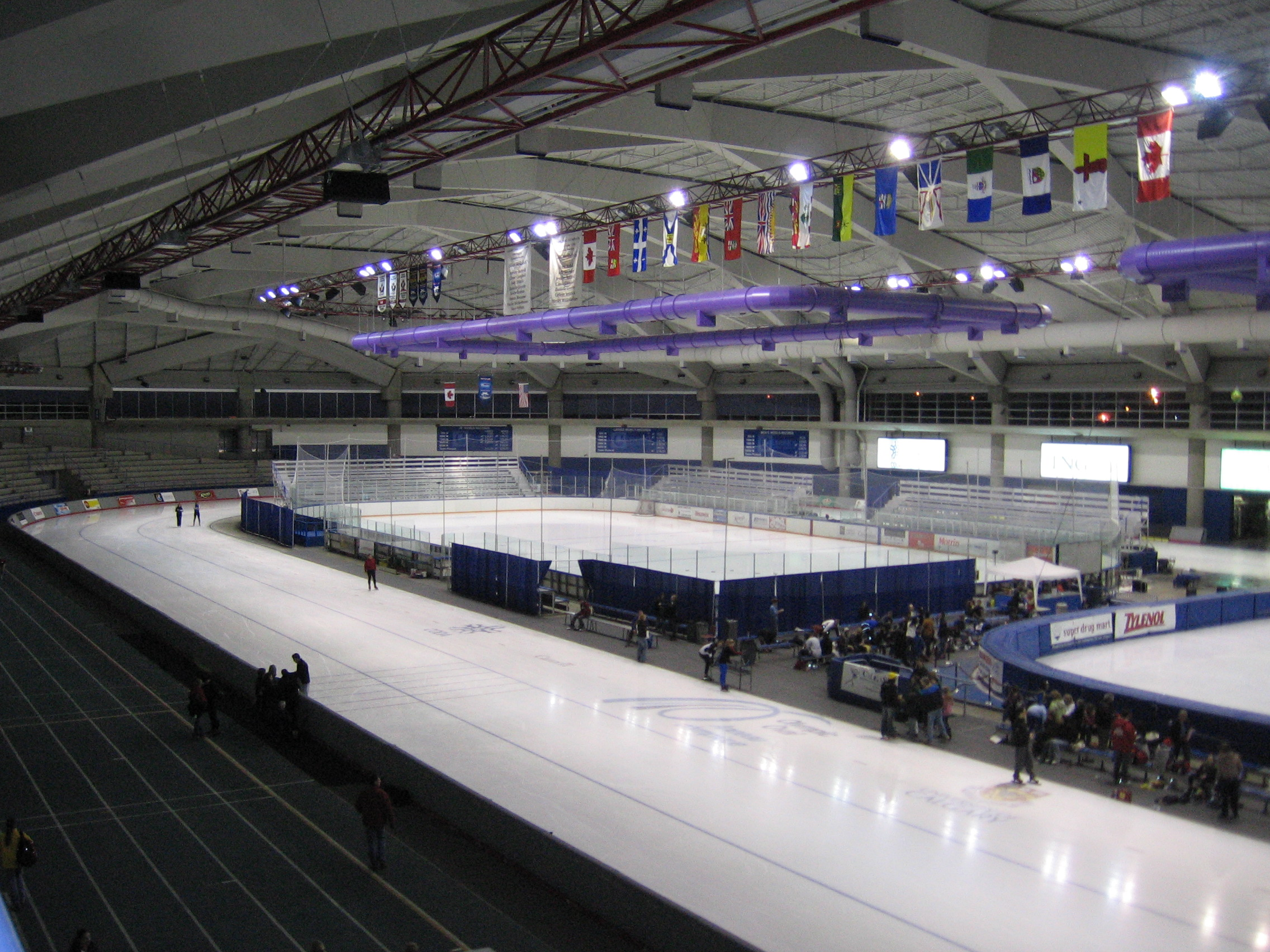
- Location: Calgary, Canada
- Venue: Olympic Oval
- Dates: 25–26 February

Medalist men
1st place, gold medalist(s)		Kai Verbij	NED
2nd place, silver medalist(s)		Håvard Holmefjord Lorentzen	NOR
3rd place, bronze medalist(s)		Kjeld Nuis	NED

Medalist women
1st place, gold medalist(s)		Nao Kodaira	JPN
2nd place, silver medalist(s)		Heather Richardson-Bergsma	USA
3rd place, bronze medalist(s)		Jorien ter Mors	NED

The 2017 World Sprint Speed Skating Championships were held at the Olympic Oval in Calgary, Alberta, Canada, from 25 to 26 February 2017.

== Schedule ==
Date	Event
25 February 2017	500 m women
25 February 2017	500 m men
25 February 2017	1000 m women
25 February 2017	1000 m men
26 February 2017	500 m women
26 February 2017	500 m men
26 February 2017	1000 m women
26 February 2017	1000 m men

== Medal summary ==
=== Medal table ===
Rank	Nation	Gold	Silver	Bronze	Total
1	Netherlands (NED)	1	0	2	3
2	Japan (JPN)	1	0	0	1
3	Norway (NOR)	0	1	0	1
3	United States (USA)	0	1	0	1
Totals (4 entries)		2	2	2	6

=== Medalists ===
Event	Gold		Silver		Bronze	
Men	Kai Verbij; Netherlands	136.065	Håvard Holmefjord Lorentzen; Norway	136.280	Kjeld Nuis; Netherlands	136.300
Women	Nao Kodaira; Japan	146.390	Heather Richardson-Bergsma; United States	147.185	Jorien ter Mors; Netherlands	147.495
