= Lin Xue =

Chinese Ming Dynasty female singer and painter

- Born: end of 16th century Sanming, Fujian, Ming dynasty China
- Died: after 1642
- Known for: Painting
- Movement: Southern School

Lin Xue (Chinese: 林雪), also known by her courtesy name Lin Tiansu (Chinese: 林天素), was a Chinese poet, painter, and calligrapher during the Ming dynasty, noted for her landscape paintings.

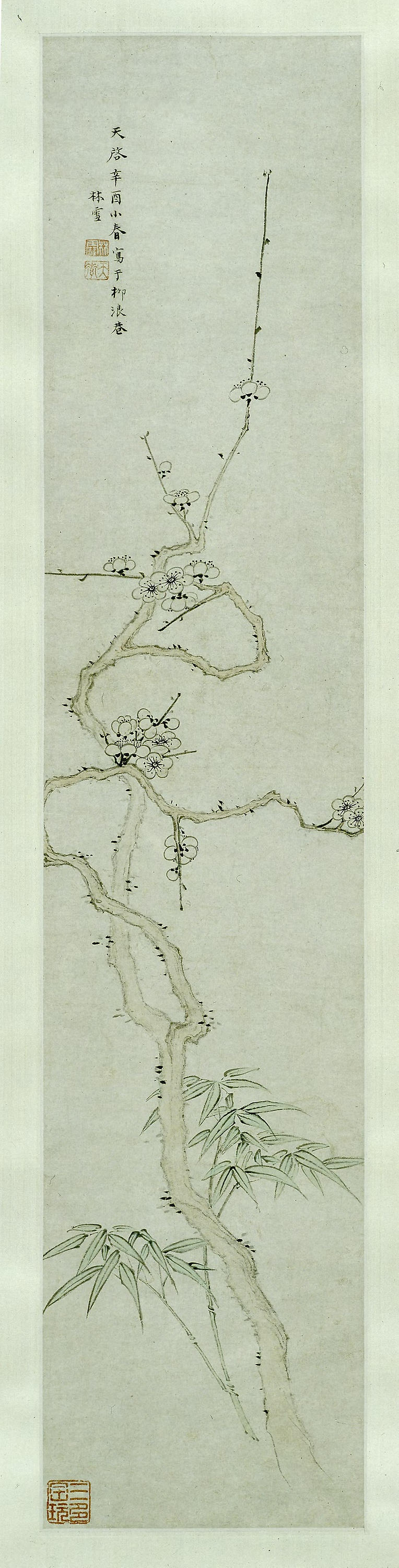
Lin Xue - Prunus and Bamboo - 1988.172 - Art Institute of Chicago

Lin lived by the West Lake in Hangzhou, where she worked as a courtesan until her marriage into a respectable family.

Lin drew the attention of leading poets and painters of the time, including Li Liufang and Dong Qichang. She painted in the latter's Southern School style, and is described as having a fluid hand with a feminine sensibility. Her landscape album of 1621 contained copies of earlier masterworks, which were deemed exquisite by critics due to how closely they resembled the originals.

== List of works ==
- Landscape (folding fan), ink on gold paper, 1620, private collection
- Landscape after Huang Gongwang (Landschaft im Stil des Huang Gongwang) (folding fan), ink on gold paper, ca. 1620, in the Museum für Ostasiatische Kunst, Köln
- Geese Descending on Sands (hanging scroll), ink and color on silk, 1621, in the National Museum of Asian Art, Smithsonian Institution
- Prunus and Bamboo (hanging scroll), ink and slight color on paper, 1621, in the Art Institute of Chicago
- Landscape (handscroll), ink and colors on paper, 1622, private collection
- Landscape (folding fan), ink on gold paper, 1642, private collection
