= Jerica Tandiman =

American speed skater

Personal information
- Born: November 2, 1994 (age 32)

Sport
- Country: United States
- Sport: Speed skating

Jerica Tandiman (November 2, 1994) is an American speed skater.

== Early life ==
Tandiman is from Kearns, Utah. She began skating in 2002 after the Utah Olympic Oval was built near her house.

== Career ==
At the 2018 Winter Olympics United States speed skating trials, she finished 4th in the 1000 meters. While the top three normally qualify for the team, since Mia Manganello did not have the required qualifying time at that distance, Tandiman was one of the top three qualifiers for the event. She had to wait to see the total number of qualified female athletes, but ultimately made the team. She currently practices at the Utah Olympic Oval.
