= Alexandra Ianculescu =

Speed skater

Alexandra Ianculescu OLY
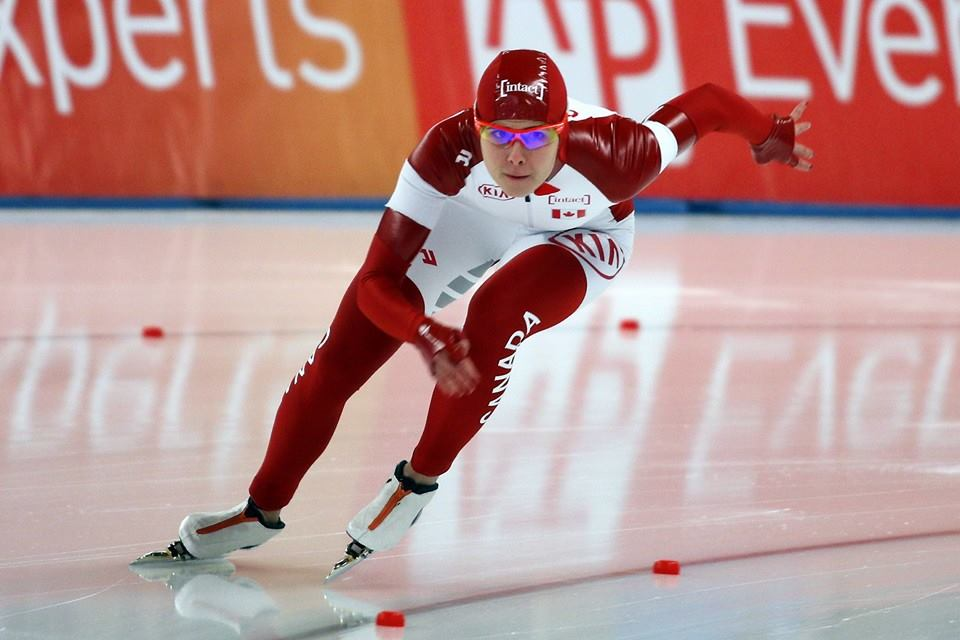
- Ianculescu competing at the World Cup in Heerenveen in 2014

Personal information
- Nationality: Romanian; Canadian
- Born: 21 October 1991 (age 34) Sibiu, Romania
- Height: 5 ft 7 in (170 cm)
- Weight: 58 kg (128 lb)
- Website: alexandra-ianculescu.com

Sport
- Sport: Speed skating
- Club: Markham Speed Skating Club

Alexandra Ianculescu OLY (born 21 October 1991 in Sibiu) is a Romanian-Canadian speed skater.

She immigrated with her family to Toronto, Ontario in 2001, and since 2008 trains and resides in Calgary, Alberta. Ianculescu was a member of the Canadian junior national speed skating team in 2011, and represented Canada at two junior championships. She later represented Canada on the World Cup circuit as a senior skater, competing in the 500m and the 1000m distances. In 2016, Alexandra competed for Romania in long track speed skating. She competed in the women's 500 metres at the 2018 Winter Olympics for Romania. In 2021, Ianculescu retired from competitive speed skating in order to pursue a second Olympic appearance, and a professional career in road and track cycling. She races for a Dutch Elite women's road team called NWVG-UPLUS. So far, she did not reach any significant result.
