= Nao Kodaira =

Japanese speed skater (born 1986)

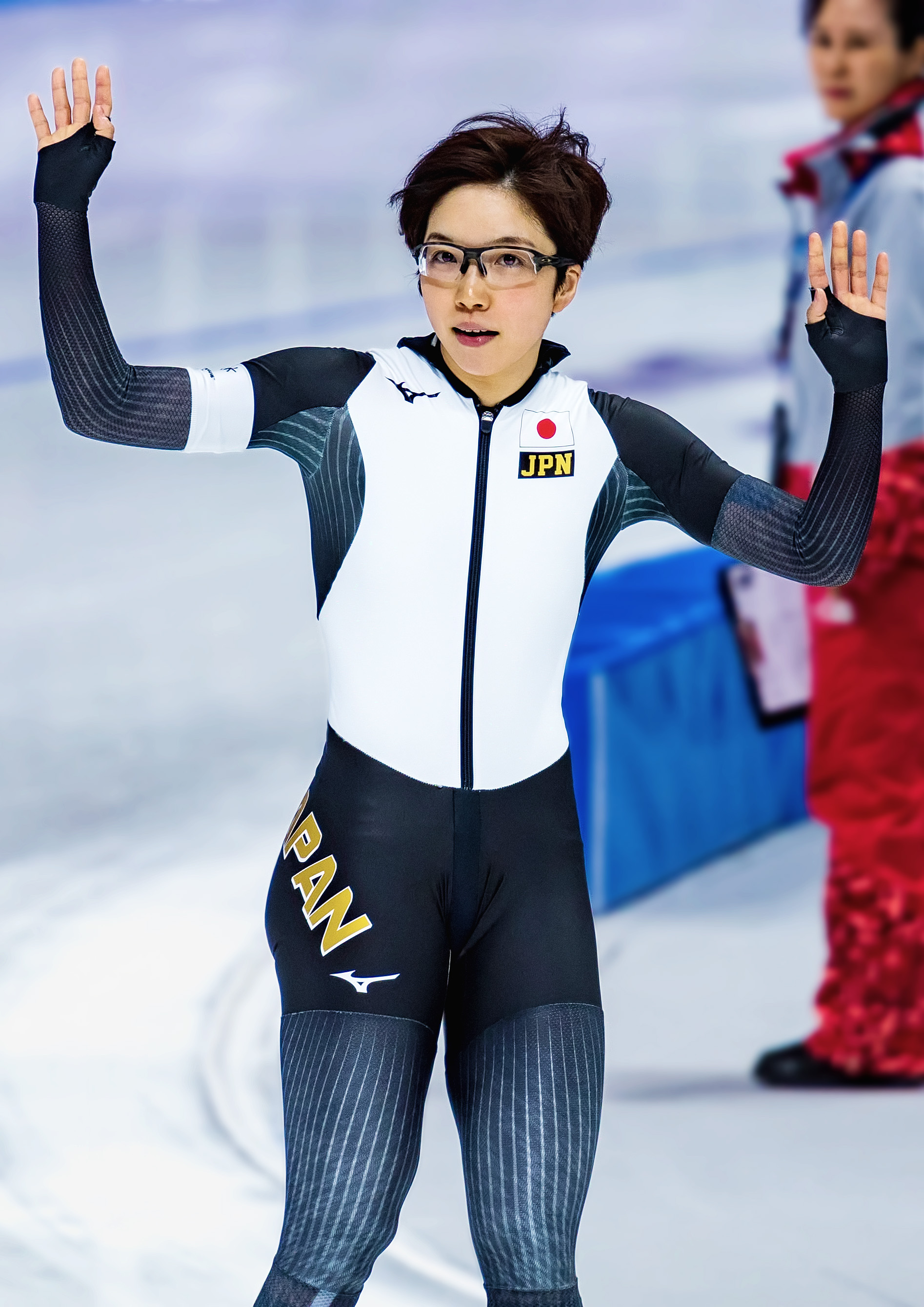
- Kodaira during the 2018 Olympics

Personal information
- Native name: 小平 奈緒
- Nationality: Japanese
- Born: 26 May 1986 (age 40) Chino, Nagano, Japan
- Height: 1.65 m (5 ft 5 in)
- Weight: 61 kg (134 lb)

Sport
- Country: Japan
- Sport: Speed skating
- Event(s): 500 m, 1000 m, 1500 m
- Retired: 2022
Medal record
Olympic Games
Gold medal – first place	2018 Pyeongchang	500 m
Silver medal – second place	2018 Pyeongchang	1000 m
Silver medal – second place	2010 Vancouver	Team pursuit
World Single Distances Championships
Gold medal – first place	2017 Gangneung	500 m
Gold medal – first place	2020 Salt Lake City	500 m
Silver medal – second place	2017 Gangneung	1000 m
Silver medal – second place	2019 Inzell	500 m
Bronze medal – third place	2015 Heerenveen	500 m
Bronze medal – third place	2019 Inzell	1000 m
World Sprint Championships
Gold medal – first place	2017 Calgary	Sprint
Gold medal – first place	2019 Heerenveen	Sprint
Silver medal – second place	2020 Hamar	Sprint
Asian Winter Games
Gold medal – first place	2017 Sapporo	500 m
Gold medal – first place	2017 Sapporo	1000 m
Bronze medal – third place	2011 Astana/Almaty	1500 m
Winter Universiade
Gold medal – first place	2009 Harbin	1500m
Silver medal – second place	2007 Turin	1000m
Bronze medal – third place	2009 Harbin	1000m

Nao Kodaira (Japanese: 小平 奈緒; born 26 May 1986) is a Japanese former long track speed skater who specialised in the sprint distances.

She is the 2018 Olympic champion in the 500 m distance. Kodaira is the first Japanese woman to win an Olympic gold medal in speed skating.

In 2009, she graduated from Shinshu University with a bachelor's degree in education.

== Career ==
At the 2010 Winter Olympics she won a silver medal in the team pursuit event. She placed 5th in the 1000 and the 1500 m events and 12th in the 500 m one at the Olympics. At the 2014–15 World Cup stop in Seoul, South Korea, on 21 November 2014, she won the 500 m event, and she has a total of 25 podium placings in the World Cup. At the 2015 World Single Distance Championships, she won the bronze medal in the 500 m event.

At the 2017 World Single Distance Championships, she became the first Japanese woman to win an individual single distance world title winning the women's 500 m event. She won also silver medal in the 1000 m event at the Championships. At the 2017 World Sprint Championships, she won the women's competition. In the season, she became overall winner of ISU World Cup 500 m cup.

Kodaira took the top step also in every single ISU World Cup one in the 2017–18 season ahead of the Olympics.

She is the current world record holder in the 2×500 metres and the sprint combination, and the former world record holder in the 1000 metres and the team sprint, as well as the current Olympic and Japanese record holder in the 500 metres.

At the 2018 Winter Olympics, Kodaira won gold medal in the women's 500 m event and the silver medal in the women's 1000 m event respectively. In the former, she also set an Olympic record and became the first woman to break the 37-second barrier at sea level, as well as the first female Japanese Olympic champion in speed skating. In April 2022, Kodaira announced that she will retire from speed skating in October after a final race at the national single distances championship to be held in her hometown Nagano.

== Records ==
=== Personal records ===
Personal records
Speed skating
Event	Result	Date	Location	Notes
500 m	36.39	16 March 2019	Olympic Oval, Calgary	Current Japanese record.
500 m (sea level)	36.94	18 February 2018	Gangneung Oval, Gangneung	Current sea-level world best, current Olympic record.
2×500 m	73.55	26 February 2017	Olympic Oval, Calgary	Current world record.
1000 m	1:11.77	9 March 2019	Utah Olympic Oval, Salt Lake City	
1500 m	1:52.67	5 December 2021	Utah Olympic Oval, Salt Lake City	
3000 m	4:21.53	22 October 2010	M-Wave, Nagano	
Team sprint	1:26.62	22 November 2015	Utah Olympic Oval, Salt Lake City	
Sprint comb.	146.390	25–26 February 2017	Olympic Oval, Calgary	Current world record.

=== World records ===
World records
Speed skating
Event	Result	Date	Location	Notes
1000 m	1:12.09	10 December 2017	Utah Olympic Oval, Salt Lake City	World record until beaten by Brittany Bowe on 9 March 2019.
Sprint comb.	146.390	25–26 February 2017	Olympic Oval, Calgary	Current world record.

=== Olympic records ===
Olympic records
Speed skating
Event	Result	Date	Location	Notes
500 m	36.94	18 February 2018	Gangneung Oval, Gangneung	Current Olympic record.

Records
Preceded by (United States) Heather Bergsma	Women's sprint combination speed skating world record 26 February 2017 – present	Succeeded by Current holder
Preceded by (United States) Brittany Bowe	Women's 1000 m speed skating world record 10 December 2017 – 9 March 2019	Succeeded by (United States) Brittany Bowe
