= Arisa Go =

Japanese speed skater (born 1987)

Personal information
- Nationality: Japanese
- Born: 12 December 1987 (age 38) Obihiro, Hokkaido, Japan
- Height: 160 cm (5 ft 3 in)
- Weight: 54 kg (119 lb)

Sport
- Sport: Speed skating

Arisa Go (郷 亜里砂, Gō Arisa; born 12 December 1987) is a Japanese Olympian speed skater.

== Education ==
Go is studying commerce at the Yamanashi Gakuin University in Kofu, Japan.

== Career ==
Go won a bronze medal in the 500m at the 2017 Asian Winter Games. She competed in the women's 1000 metres and the women's 500 metres at the 2018 Winter Olympics.

Go received the Shiny Matsuyama Grand Prize in Japan in 2017.
