= 2014–15 ISU Speed Skating World Cup =

International speed skating competition

ISU Speed Skating World Cup
- Dates: 14 November 2014 – 22 March 2015

The 2014–15 ISU Speed Skating World Cup, officially the Essent ISU World Cup Speed Skating 2014–2015, was a series of international speed skating competitions that ran the entire season. The season started on 14 November 2014 in Obihiro, Japan, and ended with the final on 22 March 2015 in Erfurt, Germany. In total, seven competition weekends were held at six different locations, twelve cups were contested (six for men, and six for women), and 80 races took place.

The World Cup is organized by the International Skating Union (ISU).

== Calendar ==
The detailed schedule for the season. In addition, the team sprint was held as demonstration event in Obihiro and Seoul.

WC #	City	Venue	Date	500 m	1000 m	1500 m	3000 m	5000 m	10000 m	Mass start	Team pursuit
1	Obihiro	Meiji Hokkaido-Tokachi Oval	14–16 November	2m, 2w	m, w	m, w	w	m		m, w	m, w
2	Seoul	Taereung International Ice Rink	21–23 November	2m, 2w	m, w	m, w		w	m	m, w	
3	Berlin	Sportforum Hohenschönhausen	5–7 December	2m, 2w	m, w	m, w	w	m		m, w	m, w
4	Heerenveen	Thialf	12–14 December	2m, 2w	m, w	m, w	w	m		m, w	m, w
	Chelyabinsk	Uralskaya Molniya	10–11 January	2015 European Speed Skating Championships							
	Changchun	Jilin Provincial Speed Skating Rink	10–11 January	2015 Asian Single Distance Speed Skating Championships							
5	Hamar	Vikingskipet	31 January – 1 February			m, w	w	m		m, w	
6	Heerenveen	Thialf	7–8 February	2m, 2w	2m, 2w						
	Heerenveen	Thialf	12–15 February	2015 World Single Distance Speed Skating Championships							
	Astana	Alau Ice Palace	28 February – 1 March	2015 World Sprint Speed Skating Championships							
	Calgary	Olympic Oval	7–8 March	2015 World Allround Speed Skating Championships							
7	Erfurt	Gunda Niemann-Stirnemann-Halle	21–22 March	2m, 2w	m, w	m, w	w	m		m, w	
Total				12m, 12w	7m, 7w	6m, 6w	5w	5m, 1w	1m	6m, 6w	3m, 3w

Note: the men's 5000 and 10000 metres was contested as one cup, and the women's 3000 and 5000 metres was contested as one cup, as indicated by the color coding.

== Entry rules ==
=== Qualification criteria ===
In order to qualify, skaters had to achieve the following results in ISU events, international competitions or national championships between 1 July 2013 and the entry deadline for the competition concerned.

Men
Distance	Time required ^{A}	Time required ^{B}
500 m	36.20	36.60
1000 m	1:11.90	1:12.80
1500 m	1:51.00	1:52.50
3000 m	—	—
5000 m	6:48.00	6:52.00
10000 m	13:40.00 ^{C}	13:50.00 ^{D}

Women
Distance	Time required ^{A}	Time required ^{B}
500 m	40.00	40.50
1000 m	1:20.00	1:21.00
1500 m	2:03.00	2:05.00
3000 m	4:24.00	4:28.00
5000 m	7:25.00 ^{E}	7:32.00 ^{F}
10000 m	—	—

^{A} in the Olympic Oval, Calgary, or the Utah Olympic Oval, Salt Lake City
^{B} in other ice rinks
^{C} or 6:35.00 on 5000 m
^{D} or 6:40.00 on 5000 m
^{E} or 4:15.00 on 3000 m
^{F} or 4:20.00 on 3000 m

For the mass start and team pursuit events, skaters who had achieved any one of the above results qualified. However, every ISU member nation was allowed to enter a maximum of one skater per gender who had not achieved any of these results, provided that they had achieved a 1500 m result of 1:57.50 (men) or 2:10.00 (women).

=== Nation quotas ===
Every ISU member nation was allowed to enter at least one competitor for each distance, subject to the qualification criteria above. Additionally, skaters placed among the top 32 in the final 2013–14 World Cup, or included in the final qualifying list (including the reserve list) of the 2014 Winter Olympics, for the distance category concerned, was allowed entry. Nations were also allowed to earn a quota place for each skater placed on the final qualifying list (excluding the reserve list) for the Olympics. The maximum quota was 5 skaters. A member nation organizing a World Cup competition was granted the maximum quota in all events. Member nations not mentioned were allowed to enter a maximum of one skater for each distance.

Men
Nation	500 m	1000 m	1500 m	5k/10k	Mass start
Australia	2	2	1	1	1
Austria	1	2	2	1	2
Belgium	1	2	2	2	2
Belarus	1	1	1	1	1
Canada	5	4	4	2	1
China	3	2	2	2	1
Czech Republic	1	1	1	1	1
Denmark	1	1	1	1	1
Estonia	1	1	1	1	1
Finland	3	3	1	1	1
France	2	2	3	3	1
Germany	4	3	3	5	2
Hungary	1	1	2	1	1
Italy	3	2	3	2	2
Japan	5	3	2	2	2
Kazakhstan	2	4	4	2	1
South Korea	4	4	3	3	1
Latvia	2	2	2	2	1
Netherlands	5	5	5	5	2
Norway	3	4	4	4	2
New Zealand	1	1	2	2	1
Poland	3	3	4	3	2
Romania	1	1	1	1	1
Russia	5	4	5	5	2
Switzerland	1	1	1	1	2
Sweden	1	2	2	2	1
Chinese Taipei	2	2	1	1	1
United States	4	5	5	5	2

Women
Nation	500 m	1000 m	1500 m	3k/5k	Mass start
Australia	1	1	1	1	1
Austria	2	2	2	2	1
Belgium	1	1	2	2	2
Belarus	2	1	1	1	1
Canada	4	4	4	3	2
China	4	5	3	2	1
Czech Republic	2	2	3	2	1
Denmark	1	1	1	1	1
Estonia	1	1	1	1	2
Finland	2	1	1	1	1
France	1	1	1	1	1
Germany	5	4	4	4	2
Hungary	2	1	1	1	1
Italy	2	2	2	2	2
Japan	5	5	5	5	2
Kazakhstan	2	2	2	2	1
South Korea	4	3	4	4	1
Latvia	1	1	1	1	1
Netherlands	5	5	5	5	2
Norway	1	2	3	3	2
New Zealand	1	1	1	1	1
Poland	1	4	4	5	2
Romania	1	1	1	2	1
Russia	4	5	5	4	1
Switzerland	2	2	2	1	1
Sweden	1	2	1	1	1
Chinese Taipei	1	1	1	1	1
United States	5	4	4	3	2

For the mass start event, a member nation was allowed to enter a maximum of two skaters, all subject to the qualifying criteria above. For the team pursuit event, a member nation was allowed to enter one team only per category (men/women).

The World Cup competitions 1–4 served as qualifying events for the 2015 World Single Distance Championships. World Cup 5 served as a qualifying event for the 2015 World Allround Championships, and World Cup 6 served as a qualifying event for the 2015 World Sprint Championships. Results from World Cups 1–6 defined the seeding for the Single Distance Championships. World Cups 5 and 6 had extended entry quotas due to their status as qualifying events; each ISU member nation got one more quota place than its highest quota of either of the two distances in the competition, however, the maximum quota was still 5 places.

== World records ==
World records going into the 2014–15 season.

=== Men ===
Distance	Time	Holder(s)	Nat.	Date	Venue	Reference
500 m	34.03	Jeremy Wotherspoon	(Canada)	9 November 2007	Utah Olympic Oval, Salt Lake City	
1000 m	1:06.42	Shani Davis	(United States)	7 March 2009	Utah Olympic Oval, Salt Lake City	
1500 m	1:41.04	Shani Davis	(United States)	11 December 2009	Utah Olympic Oval, Salt Lake City	
5000 m	6:03.32	Sven Kramer	(Netherlands)	17 November 2007	Olympic Oval, Calgary	
10000 m	12:41.69	Sven Kramer	(Netherlands)	10 March 2007	Utah Olympic Oval, Salt Lake City	
Team pursuit (8 laps)	3:35.60	Koen Verweij; Jan Blokhuijsen; Sven Kramer	(Netherlands)	16 November 2013	Utah Olympic Oval, Salt Lake City	

=== Women ===
Distance	Time	Holder(s)	Nat.	Date	Venue	Reference
500 m	36.36	Lee Sang-hwa	(South Korea)	16 November 2013	Utah Olympic Oval, Salt Lake City	
1000 m	1:12.58	Brittany Bowe	(United States)	17 November 2013	Utah Olympic Oval, Salt Lake City	
1500 m	1:51.79	Cindy Klassen	(Canada)	20 November 2005	Utah Olympic Oval, Salt Lake City	
3000 m	3:53.34	Cindy Klassen	(Canada)	18 March 2006	Olympic Oval, Calgary	
5000 m	6:42.66	Martina Sáblíková	(Czech Republic)	18 February 2011	Utah Olympic Oval, Salt Lake City	
Team pursuit (6 laps)	2:55.79	Kristina Groves; Christine Nesbitt; Brittany Schussler	(Canada)	6 December 2009	Olympic Oval, Calgary	
