= 2014–15 ISU Speed Skating World Cup – Women's 3000 and 5000 metres =

The 3000 and 5000 meters distances for women in the 2014–15 ISU Speed Skating World Cup were contested over six races on six occasions, out of a total of seven World Cup occasions for the season, with the first occasion taking place in Obihiro, Japan, on 14–16 November 2014, and the final occasion taking place in Erfurt, Germany, on 21–22 March 2015.

Martina Sáblíková of the Czech Republic won her ninth straight cup.

== Top three ==
Position	Athlete	Points	Previous season
1	(Czech Republic) Martina Sáblíková	580	1st
2	(Germany) Claudia Pechstein	360	2nd
3	(Netherlands) Ireen Wüst	350	6th

== Race medallists ==
WC #	Location	Date	Distance	Gold	Time	Silver	Time	Bronze	Time	Report
1	Obihiro, Japan	14 November	3000 metres	Ireen Wüst; Netherlands	4:04.91	Martina Sáblíková; Czech Republic	4:06.11	Jorien Voorhuis; Netherlands	4:07.04	
2	Seoul, South Korea	21 November	5000 metres	Claudia Pechstein; Germany	7:07.77	Martina Sáblíková; Czech Republic	7:13.08	Ivanie Blondin; Canada	7:14.53	
3	Berlin, Germany	5 December	3000 metres	Ireen Wüst; Netherlands	4:01.55	Marije Joling; Netherlands	4:03.34	Martina Sáblíková; Czech Republic	4:05.36	
4	Heerenveen, Netherlands	12 December	3000 metres	Martina Sáblíková; Czech Republic	4:02.84	Ireen Wüst; Netherlands	4:03.14	Carlijn Achtereekte; Netherlands	4:05.95	
5	Hamar, Norway	1 February	3000 metres	Martina Sáblíková; Czech Republic	4:02.84	Carlijn Achtereekte; Netherlands	4:05.95	Ireen Wüst; Netherlands	4:03.14	
7	Erfurt, Germany	22 March	3000 metres	Martina Sáblíková; Czech Republic	4:04.06	Marije Joling; Netherlands	4:05.64	Diane Valkenburg; Netherlands	4:07.85	

== Standings ==
Standings as of 22 March 2015.

#	Name	Nat.	OBI	SEO	BER	HVN	HAM	ERF	Total
1	Martina Sáblíková	(Czech Republic)	80	80	70	100	100	150	580
2	Claudia Pechstein	(Germany)	40	100	45	50	35	90	360
3	Ireen Wüst	(Netherlands)	100		100	80	70		350
4	Marije Joling	(Netherlands)	50		80	40	60	120	350
5	Jorien Voorhuis	(Netherlands)	70	50	50	30	50	32	282
6	Diane Valkenburg	(Netherlands)	60	60			45	106	271
7	Carlijn Achtereekte	(Netherlands)			32	70	80	76	258
8	Ivanie Blondin	(Canada)	32	70	40	60		40	242
9	Olga Graf	(Russia)	18	32	60	45	40	28	223
10	Bente Kraus	(Germany)	25	35	30	18	16	24	148
11	Ida Njåtun	(Norway)	30			32	30	36	128
12	Yuliya Skokova	(Russia)	27	40	12	12	18	18	127
13	Kim Bo-reum	(South Korea)	23	30	25	16	21		115
14	Carien Kleibeuker	(Netherlands)			27	35		45	107
15	Nana Takagi	(Japan)	35		35	25	12		107
16	Anna Chernova	(Russia)	19	21	21	21	11		93
17	Shoko Fujimura	(Japan)	21	25	18	10	2	16	92
18	Luiza Złotkowska	(Poland)	12			27	25	21	85
19	Ayaka Kikuchi	(Japan)	16	7	14	19	7	14	77
20	Natalya Voronina	(Russia)	15	6	7	23	14		65
21	Katarzyna Woźniak	(Poland)	10	5	23	14	9		61
22	Jelena Peeters	(Belgium)	9	23	16	6	3		57
23	Yvonne Nauta	(Netherlands)		45					45
23	Linda de Vries	(Netherlands)	45						45
25	Francesca Lollobrigida	(Italy)			19	3	23		45
26	Marina Zueva	(Belarus)			15		27		42
27	Isabell Ost	(Germany)			11	15	15		41
28	Zhao Xin	(China)	11		9	11	4		35
29	Stephanie Beckert	(Germany)	5	19	10				34
30	Heather Richardson	(United States)					32		32
31	Rixt Meijer	(Netherlands)		27					27
32	Maki Tabata	(Japan)	14	2		5			21
33	Risa Takayama	(Japan)	4	11	1	4			20
34	Miho Takagi	(Japan)					19		19
35	Liu Jing	(China)	1		6	9	1		17
36	Aleksandra Goss	(Poland)	3	3	4	1	5		16
37	Maria Lamb	(United States)		15					15
38	Kali Christ	(Canada)				7	6		13
39	Jun Ye-jin	(South Korea)	6	4					10
40	Lisa van der Geest	(Netherlands)		9					9
41	Park Cho-weon	(South Korea)	7						7
42	Saskia Alusalu	(Estonia)			5	2			7
43	Josie Spence	(Canada)	2	1	3				6
44	Jennifer Bay	(Germany)			2				2
