= 2014–15 ISU Speed Skating World Cup – Men's 5000 and 10000 metres =

The 5000 and 10000 meters distances for men in the 2014–15 ISU Speed Skating World Cup were contested over six races on six occasions, out of a total of seven World Cup occasions for the season, with the first occasion taking place in Obihiro, Japan, on 14–16 November 2014, and the final occasion taking place in Erfurt, Germany, on 21–22 March 2015.

Jorrit Bergsma of the Netherlands won the cup for the third straight season.

== Top three ==
Position	Athlete	Points	Previous season
1	(Netherlands) Jorrit Bergsma	430	1st
2	(Norway) Sverre Lunde Pedersen	415	4th
3	(Netherlands) Bob de Jong	346	9th

== Race medallists ==
WC #	Location	Date	Distance	Gold	Time	Silver	Time	Bronze	Time	Report
1	Obihiro, Japan	14 November	5000 metres	Sven Kramer; Netherlands	6:20.90	Aleksandr Rumyantsev; Russia	6:23.56	Wouter olde Heuvel; Netherlands	6:24.03	
2	Seoul, South Korea	22 November	10000 metres	Bob de Jong; Netherlands	13:17.51	Bart Swings; Belgium	13:32.45	Aleksandr Rumyantsev; Russia	13:37.59	
3	Berlin, Germany	6 December	5000 metres	Jorrit Bergsma; Netherlands	6:17.59	Sverre Lunde Pedersen; Norway	6:20.97	Douwe de Vries; Netherlands	6:23.50	
4	Heerenveen, Netherlands	13 December	5000 metres	Sven Kramer; Netherlands	6:12.74	Jorrit Bergsma; Netherlands	6:14.08	Wouter olde Heuvel; Netherlands	6:19,58	
5	Hamar, Norway	31 January	5000 metres	Jorrit Bergsma; Netherlands	6:17.89	Douwe de Vries; Netherlands	6:23.04	Sverre Lunde Pedersen; Norway	6:23.21	
7	Erfurt, Germany	21 March	5000 metres	Jorrit Bergsma; Netherlands	6:17.49	Sverre Lunde Pedersen; Norway	6:20.64	Patrick Beckert; Germany	6:21.80	

== Standings ==
Standings as of 21 March 2015 (end of the season).

#	Name	Nat.	OBI	SEO	BER	HVN	HAM	ERF	Total
1	Jorrit Bergsma	(Netherlands)			100	80	100	150	430
2	Sverre Lunde Pedersen	(Norway)	35	60	80	50	70	120	415
3	Bob de Jong	(Netherlands)	60	100	60	60	21	45	346
4	Patrick Beckert	(Germany)	50	50	30	35	60	106	331
5	Aleksandr Rumyantsev	(Russia)	80	70	45	45	45	40	325
6	Bart Swings	(Belgium)	25	80	50	40	35	90	320
7	Douwe de Vries	(Netherlands)	40	45	70	25	80	36	296
8	Wouter olde Heuvel	(Netherlands)	70			70	40	76	256
9	Sven Kramer	(Netherlands)	100			100			200
10	Lee Seung-hoon	(South Korea)	30	35	40	16	30		151
11	Andrea Giovannini	(Italy)	27	25	21	21		28	138
12	Jan Szymański	(Poland)	32	30	35	14	14		125
13	Yevgeny Seryaev	(Russia)	18	40	18	18	18		112
14	Alexis Contin	(France)			27	30	32		89
15	Håvard Bøkko	(Norway)				27	25	32	84
16	Ted-Jan Bloemen	(Canada)		23	25	23	12		83
17	Danil Sinitsyn	(Russia)	14	11	16	19	23		83
18	Alexej Baumgärtner	(Germany)	16	19	14		9	24	82
19	Danila Semerikov	(Russia)	21	21	12	12			66
20	Jordan Belchos	(Canada)	23	18	10	10	1		62
21	Denis Yuskov	(Russia)					50		50
22	Nils van der Poel	(Sweden)			7	32	10		49
23	Frank Vreugdenhil	(Netherlands)		15	32				47
24	Koen Verweij	(Netherlands)	45						45
25	Shane Williamson	(Japan)	9	5	9	15			38
26	Sergey Gryaztsov	(Russia)	12	9	3	9	5		38
27	Erik Jan Kooiman	(Netherlands)		32					32
28	Jonas Pflug	(Germany)			19		11		30
29	Jouke Hoogeveen	(Netherlands)		27					27
29	Jos de Vos	(Netherlands)					27		27
31	Marco Weber	(Germany)			15	6	6		27
32	Arjan Stroetinga	(Netherlands)			23				23
33	Konrad Niedźwiedzki	(Poland)					19		19
33	Takuro Ogawa	(Japan)	19						19
35	Liu Yiming	(China)	15	2					17
36	Peter Michael	(New Zealand)			11	5			16
37	Simen Spieler Nilsen	(Norway)					15		15
38	Kim Cheol-min	(South Korea)	11			3			14
39	Fredrik van der Horst	(Norway)			6		7		13
39	Ole Bjørnsmoen Næss	(Norway)			4	7	2		13
41	Viktor Hald Thorup	(Denmark)				11			11
42	Masahito Obayashi	(Japan)	7	4					11
43	Maksim Baklashkin	(Kazakhstan)	10						10
44	Martin Hänggi	(Switzerland)		7					7
45	Luca Stefani	(Italy)		6		1			7
46	Stefan Waples	(Canada)	6						6
47	Ko Byung-wook	(South Korea)	4		2				6
48	Haralds Silovs	(Latvia)			5				5
48	Adrian Wielgat	(Poland)	5						5
50	Zbigniew Bródka	(Poland)					4		4
50	Vitaly Mikhailov	(Belarus)				4			4
52	Sebastian Druszkiewicz	(Italy)		3					3
52	Denny Morrison	(Canada)					3		3
52	Nicola Tumolero	(Italy)	3						3
55	Dmitry Babenko	(Kazakhstan)				2			2
55	Linus Heidegger	(Austria)	2						2
57	Edwin Park	(United States)		1					1
57	Rehanbai Talabuhan	(China)	1						1
57	Aleksander Waagenes	(Norway)			1				1
