= 2014–15 ISU Speed Skating World Cup – World Cup 1 – Women's 3000 metres =

International speed skating competition

The women's 3000 metres race of the 2014–15 ISU Speed Skating World Cup 1, arranged in the Meiji Hokkaido-Tokachi Oval, in Obihiro, Japan, was held on 14 November 2014.

Ireen Wüst of the Netherlands won, followed by Martina Sáblíková of the Czech Republic in second place, and Jorien Voorhuis of the Netherlands in third place. Ivanie Blondin of Canada won Division B.

== Results ==
The race took place on Friday, 14 November, with Division B scheduled in the morning session, at 13:00, and Division A scheduled in the afternoon session, at 17:31.

=== Division A ===
Rank	Name	Nat.	Pair	Lane	Time	WC points	GWC points
1st place, gold medalist(s)	Ireen Wüst	(Netherlands)	7	o	4:04.91	100	100
2nd place, silver medalist(s)	Martina Sáblíková	(Czech Republic)	7	i	4:06.11	80	80
3rd place, bronze medalist(s)	Jorien Voorhuis	(Netherlands)	5	o	4:07.04	70	70
4	Diane Valkenburg	(Netherlands)	4	o	4:07.57	60	60
5	Marije Joling	(Netherlands)	6	i	4:08.22	50	50
6	Linda de Vries	(Netherlands)	5	i	4:09.27	45	—
7	Claudia Pechstein	(Germany)	8	o	4:11.57	40	
8	Nana Takagi	(Japan)	3	o	4:11.83	35	
9	Ida Njåtun	(Norway)	3	i	4:12.99	30	
10	Bente Kraus	(Germany)	1	i	4:13.03	25	
11	Shoko Fujimura	(Japan)	1	o	4:13.56	21	
12	Olga Graf	(Russia)	8	i	4:14.34	18	
13	Ayaka Kikuchi	(Japan)	2	i	4:14.73	16	
14	Maki Tabata	(Japan)	4	i	4:15.27	14	
15	Luiza Złotkowska	(Poland)	6	o	4:15.84	12	
16	Katarzyna Woźniak	(Poland)	2	o	4:17.17	10	

=== Division B ===
Rank	Name	Nat.	Pair	Lane	Time	WC points
1	Ivanie Blondin	(Canada)	10	o	4:08.23	32
2	Yuliya Skokova	(Russia)	7	i	4:12.19	27
3	Kim Bo-reum	(South Korea)	8	o	4:14.43	23
4	Anna Chernova	(Russia)	5	i	4:15.31	19
5	Natalya Voronina	(Russia)	5	o	4:16.20	15
6	Zhao Xin	(China)	6	i	4:16.57	11
7	Jelena Peeters	(Belgium)	10	i	4:16.80	9
8	Park Cho-weon	(South Korea)	4	i	4:18.55	7
9	Jun Ye-jin	(South Korea)	4	o	4:18.85	6
10	Stephanie Beckert	(Germany)	8	i	4:19.05	5
11	Risa Takayama	(Japan)	3	o	4:19.97	4
12	Aleksandra Goss	(Poland)	9	o	4:20.99	3
13	Josie Spence	(Canada)	2	i	4:21.07	2
14	Liu Jing	(China)	1	i	4:21.32	1
15	Lauren McGuire	(Canada)	7	o	4:23.53	—
16	Maria Lamb	(United States)	9	i	4:23.81	
17	Urszula Włodarczyk	(Poland)	2	o	4:25.69	
18	Angelika Fudalej	(Poland)	6	o	4:26.17	
19	Noh Seon-yeong	(South Korea)	3	i	4:26.29	
20	Natálie Kerschbaummayr	(Czech Republic)	1	o	5:01.86	
