= 2014–15 ISU Speed Skating World Cup – World Cup 1 – Women's 1500 metres =

The women's 1500 metres race of the 2014–15 ISU Speed Skating World Cup 1, arranged in the Meiji Hokkaido-Tokachi Oval, in Obihiro, Japan, was held on 16 November 2014.

Ireen Wüst of the Netherlands won, followed by Marrit Leenstra of the Netherlands in second place, and Yuliya Skokova of Russia in third place. Li Qishi of China won Division B.

== Results ==
The race took place on Sunday, 16 November, with Division B scheduled in the morning session, at 10:35, and Division A scheduled in the afternoon session, at 14:30.

=== Division A ===
Rank	Name	Nat.	Pair	Lane	Time	WC points	GWC points
1st place, gold medalist(s)	Ireen Wüst	(Netherlands)	9	o	1:56.93	100	100
2nd place, silver medalist(s)	Marrit Leenstra	(Netherlands)	10	i	1:57.76	80	80
3rd place, bronze medalist(s)	Yuliya Skokova	(Russia)	8	o	1:58.10	70	70
4	Ida Njåtun	(Norway)	8	i	1:59.06	60	60
5	Marije Joling	(Netherlands)	9	i	1:59.09	50	50
6	Linda de Vries	(Netherlands)	5	i	1:59.32	45	—
7	Martina Sáblíková	(Czech Republic)	4	i	1:59.61	40	
8	Nana Takagi	(Japan)	1	i	1:59.93	36	
9	Nao Kodaira	(Japan)	2	i	2:00.14	32	
10	Luiza Złotkowska	(Poland)	7	i	2:00.16	28	
11	Olga Graf	(Russia)	10	i	2:00.21	24	
12	Ayaka Kikuchi	(Japan)	1	o	2:00.29	21	
13	Karolína Erbanová	(Czech Republic)	2	o	2:00.31	18	
14	Kali Christ	(Canada)	3	i	2:01.64	16	
15	Olga Fatkulina	(Russia)	7	o	2:01.77	14	
16	Margarita Ryzhova	(Russia)	3	o	2:02.16	12	
17	Gabriele Hirschbichler	(Germany)	5	o	2:02.90	10	
18	Katarzyna Woźniak	(Poland)	6	o	2:03.44	8	
19	Bente Kraus	(Germany)	6	i	2:04.05	6	
20	Aleksandra Goss	(Poland)	4	o	2:27.52	5	

=== Division B ===
Rank	Name	Nat.	Pair	Lane	Time	WC points
1	Li Qishi	(China)	5	o	1:58.95	25
2	Melissa Wijfje	(Netherlands)	9	o	2:00.26	19
3	Zhao Xin	(China)	4	i	2:01.74	15
4	Misaki Oshigiri	(Japan)	6	o	2:03.09	11
5	Jelena Peeters	(Belgium)	7	i	2:03.25	8
6	Kim Bo-reum	(South Korea)	5	i	2:03.39	6
7	Aleksandra Kachurkina	(Russia)	6	i	2:03.53	4
8	Liu Jing	(China)	4	o	2:04.35	2
9	Park Cho-weon	(South Korea)	3	o	2:04.60	1
10	Noh Seon-yeong	(South Korea)	8	i	2:04.69	—
11	Saori Toi	(Japan)	7	o	2:05.88	
12	Kate Hanly	(Canada)	8	o	2:06.11	
13	Nikola Zdráhalová	(Czech Republic)	2	o	2:07.92	
14	Lauren McGuire	(Canada)	2	i	2:08.42	
15	Jun Ye-jin	(South Korea)	1	i	2:09.20	
16	Josie Spence	(Canada)	9	i	2:24.90	
17	Yekaterina Aydova	(Kazakhstan)	3	i	DNS	
