= 2014–15 ISU Speed Skating World Cup – World Cup 2 – Women's 5000 metres =

The women's 5000 metres race of the 2014–15 ISU Speed Skating World Cup 2, arranged in the Taereung International Ice Rink, in Seoul, South Korea, was held on 21 November 2014.

Claudia Pechstein of Germany won, followed by Martina Sáblíková of the Czech Republic in second place, and Ivanie Blondin of Canada in third place. Olga Graf of Russia won Division B.

== Results ==
The race took place on Friday, 21 November, with Division B scheduled in the morning session, at 10:45, and Division A scheduled in the afternoon session, at 15:00.

=== Division A ===
Rank	Name	Nat.	Pair	Lane	Time	WC points	GWC points
1st place, gold medalist(s)	Claudia Pechstein	(Germany)	5	o	7:07.77	100	100
2nd place, silver medalist(s)	Martina Sáblíková	(Czech Republic)	6	i	7:13.08	80	80
3rd place, bronze medalist(s)	Ivanie Blondin	(Canada)	4	o	7:14.53	70	70
4	Diane Valkenburg	(Netherlands)	5	i	7:17.81	60	60
5	Jorien Voorhuis	(Netherlands)	6	o	7:19.54	50	50
6	Yvonne Nauta	(Netherlands)	1	o	7:22.61	45	—
7	Yuliya Skokova	(Russia)	3	i	7:24.53	40	
8	Bente Kraus	(Germany)	3	o	7:25.62	35	
9	Kim Bo-reum	(South Korea)	2	i	7:26.63	30	
10	Shoko Fujimura	(Japan)	2	o	7:27.82	25	
11	Anna Chernova	(Russia)	1	i	7:29.59	21	
12	Nana Takagi	(Japan)	4	i	DQ		

=== Division B ===
Rank	Name	Nat.	Pair	Lane	Time	WC points
1	Olga Graf	(Russia)	10	i	7:15.11	32
2	Rixt Meijer	(Netherlands)	2	o	7:16.68	27
3	Jelena Peeters	(Belgium)	7	i	7:22.01	23
4	Stephanie Beckert	(Germany)	6	i	7:24.96	19
5	Maria Lamb	(United States)	3	i	7:28.44	15
6	Risa Takayama	(Japan)	6	o	7:29.28	11
7	Lisa van der Geest	(Netherlands)	2	i	7:30.55	9
8	Ayaka Kikuchi	(Japan)	10	o	7:31.36	7
9	Natalya Voronina	(Russia)	9	i	7:33.36	6
10	Katarzyna Woźniak	(Poland)	8	o	7:33.37	5
11	Jun Ye-jin	(South Korea)	7	o	7:33.74	4
12	Aleksandra Goss	(Poland)	5	i	7:34.18	3
13	Maki Tabata	(Japan)	9	o	7:35.75	2
14	Josie Spence	(Canada)	5	o	7:36.50	1
15	Zhao Xin	(China)	8	i	7:38.28	—
16	Francesca Lollobrigida	(Italy)	1	i	7:39.78	
17	Lauren McGuire	(Canada)	4	o	7:44.49	
18	Angelika Fudalej	(Poland)	3	o	7:47.45	
19	Liu Jing	(China)	4	i	7:47.65	
20	Nikola Zdráhalová	(Czech Republic)	1	o	7:49.37	
