= 2014–15 ISU Speed Skating World Cup – World Cup 1 – Women's mass start =

The women's mass start race of the 2014–15 ISU Speed Skating World Cup 1, arranged in the Meiji Hokkaido-Tokachi Oval in Obihiro, Japan, was held on 16 November 2014.

Ivanie Blondin of Canada won the race, Nana Takagi of Japan came second, and Irene Schouten of the Netherlands third.

== Results ==
The race took place on Sunday, 16 November, scheduled in the afternoon session, at 17:25.

				Race points							
Rank	Name	Nat.	Laps	Split 1	Split 2	Split 3	Finish	Total	Time	WC points	GWC points
1st place, gold medalist(s)	Ivanie Blondin	(Canada)	16	1			60	61	8:33.24	100	100
2nd place, silver medalist(s)	Nana Takagi	(Japan)	16				40	40	8:33.44	80	80
3rd place, bronze medalist(s)	Irene Schouten	(Netherlands)	16				20	20	8:33.54	70	70
4	Miho Takagi	(Japan)	16	5	3	1		9	8:39.11	60	60
5	Rixt Meijer	(Netherlands)	16		5			5	8:36.70	50	50
6	Martina Sáblíková	(Czech Republic)	16			3		3	8:35.72	45	—
7	Josie Spence	(Canada)	16	3				3	8:37.67	40	
8	Claudia Pechstein	(Germany)	16		1			1	8:35.00	36	
9	Vanessa Bittner	(Austria)	16					0	8:34.73	32	
10	Kim Bo-reum	(South Korea)	16					0	8:35.05	28	
11	Jelena Peeters	(Belgium)	16					0	8:35.07	24	
12	Natalya Voronina	(Russia)	16					0	8:36.43	21	
13	Liu Yichi	(China)	16					0	8:36.60	18	
14	Bente Kraus	(Germany)	16					0	8:37.54	16	
15	Aleksandra Goss	(Poland)	16					0	8:38.91	14	
16	Nikola Zdráhalová	(Czech Republic)	16					0	8:42.74	14	
17	Liu Jing	(China)	16					0	8:54.48	10	
18	Urszula Włodarczyk	(Poland)	16					0	9:05.54	8	
19	Jun Ye-jin	(South Korea)	15			5		0	8:33.26	6	
