= 2014–15 ISU Speed Skating World Cup – World Cup 1 =

The first competition weekend of the 2014–15 ISU Speed Skating World Cup was held in the Meiji Hokkaido-Tokachi Oval in Obihiro, Japan, from Friday, 14 November, until Sunday, 16 November 2014.

Pavel Kulizhnikov of Russia made a successful World Cup debut by taking the silver medal in the men's first 500 m race on Friday, and then winning both the 1000 m race on Saturday and the second 500 m race on Sunday. Sven Kramer of the Netherlands won gold medals in both 5000 m and team pursuit.

Ireen Wüst of the Netherlands managed to win three gold medals over the weekend, in the women's 1500 and 3000 m races, and as part of the Dutch team in the team pursuit. She also won a silver medal in the 1000 m competition. Lee Sang-hwa of South Korea took the gold medal in both 500 m races.

No world records were set during the weekend, but in the women's 500 m, Vanessa Bittner of Austria set a new national record on both senior and junior level in the A division of the Sunday race, after having won the B division on Friday.

Martin Hänggi of Switzerland, at age 46, set a record as the oldest participant at a World Cup event when he skated in the 5000 m race.

== Schedule ==
The detailed schedule of events:

Date	Session	Events	Comment
Friday, 14 November	Morning	10:54: 5000 m men 11:54: 500 m women (1); 12:13: 500 m men (1); 13:00: 3000 m women	Division B
Friday, 14 November	Afternoon	15:00: 5000 m men 16:22: 500 m women (1); 16:47: 500 m men (1); 17:32: 3000 m women	Division A
Saturday, 15 November	Morning	12:25: 1000 m women 13:07: 1000 m men	Division B
Saturday, 15 November	Afternoon	15:00: 1000 m women 15:30: 1000 m men	Division A
Saturday, 15 November	Afternoon	16:23: Team pursuit men 17:32: Team pursuit women	
Sunday, 16 November	Morning	10:35: 1500 m women 11:28: 1500 m men 12:30: 500 m women (2); 12:49: 500 m men (2)	Division B
Sunday, 16 November	Afternoon	14:30: 1500 m women 15:23: 1500 m men 16:13: 500 m women (2); 16:40: 500 m men (2)	Division A
Sunday, 16 November	Afternoon	17:25: Mass start women 17:45: Mass start men	

All times are JST (UTC+9).

== Medal summary ==
=== Men's events ===
Event	Race #	Gold	Time	Silver	Time	Bronze	Time	Report
500 m	1	Jan Smeekens; Netherlands	35.06	Pavel Kulizhnikov; Russia	35.16	Ruslan Murashov; Russia	35.24	
500 m	2	Pavel Kulizhnikov; Russia	34.96	Jan Smeekens; Netherlands	35.09	Ryohei Haga; Japan	35.17	
1000 m		Pavel Kulizhnikov; Russia	1:09.23	Kjeld Nuis; Netherlands	1:09.27	Samuel Schwarz; Germany	1:09.77	
1500 m		Kjeld Nuis; Netherlands	1:45.97	Wouter olde Heuvel; Netherlands	1:46.52	Koen Verweij; Netherlands	1:46.90	
5000 m		Sven Kramer; Netherlands	6:20.90	Aleksandr Rumyantsev; Russia	6:23.56	Wouter olde Heuvel; Netherlands	6:24.03	
Mass start		Lee Seung-hoon; South Korea	60 ^{A}	Kim Cheol-min; South Korea	40 ^{A}	Bart Swings; Belgium	20 ^{A}	
Team pursuit		Netherlands; Sven Kramer; Wouter olde Heuvel; Douwe de Vries	3:43.68	South Korea; Lee Seung-hoon; Kim Cheol-min; Ko Byung-wook	3:47.15	Russia; Aleksandr Rumyantsev; Danila Semerikov; Danil Sinitsyn	3:48.22	

^{A} In mass start, race points are accumulated during the race. The skater with most race points is the winner.

=== Women's events ===
Event	Race #	Gold	Time	Silver	Time	Bronze	Time	Report
500 m	1	Lee Sang-hwa; South Korea	38.07	Nao Kodaira; Japan	38.18	Olga Fatkulina; Russia	38.50	
500 m	2	Lee Sang-hwa; South Korea	37.92	Nao Kodaira; Japan	38.06	Vanessa Bittner; Austria	38.33; NR	
1000 m		Marrit Leenstra; Netherlands	1:16.23	Ireen Wüst; Netherlands	1:16.34	Li Qishi; China	1:16.54	
1500 m		Ireen Wüst; Netherlands	1:56.93	Marrit Leenstra; Netherlands	1:57.76	Yuliya Skokova; Russia	1:58.10	
3000 m		Ireen Wüst; Netherlands	4:04.91	Martina Sáblíková; Czech Republic	4:06.11	Jorien Voorhuis; Netherlands	4:07.04	
Mass start		Ivanie Blondin; Canada	61 ^{A}	Nana Takagi; Japan	40 ^{A}	Irene Schouten; Netherlands	20 ^{A}	
Team pursuit		Netherlands; Ireen Wüst; Marrit Leenstra; Marije Joling	3:02.54	Japan; Nana Takagi; Ayaka Kikuchi; Maki Tabata	3:04.78	Germany; Claudia Pechstein; Bente Kraus; Gabriele Hirschbichler	3:06.51	

^{A} In mass start, race points are accumulated during the race. The skater with most race points is the winner.
