= 2014–15 ISU Speed Skating World Cup – World Cup 3 – Women's 3000 metres =

The women's 3000 metres race of the 2014–15 ISU Speed Skating World Cup 3, arranged in Sportforum Hohenschönhausen, in Berlin, Germany, was held on 5 December 2014.

Ireen Wüst of the Netherlands won, followed by Marije Joling of the Netherlands in second place, and Martina Sáblíková of the Czech Republic in third place. Carlijn Achtereekte of the Netherlands won Division B.

Marina Zueva of Belarus and Saskia Alusalu of Estonia set new national records, skating in the B Division.

== Results ==
The race took place on Friday, 5 December, with Division B scheduled in the morning session, at 12:10, and Division A scheduled in the afternoon session, at 16:00.

=== Division A ===
Rank	Name	Nat.	Pair	Lane	Time	WC points	GWC points
1st place, gold medalist(s)	Ireen Wüst	(Netherlands)	6	i	4:01.55	100	100
2nd place, silver medalist(s)	Marije Joling	(Netherlands)	4	i	4:03.34	80	80
3rd place, bronze medalist(s)	Martina Sáblíková	(Czech Republic)	8	i	4:05.36	70	70
4	Olga Graf	(Russia)	4	o	4:05.53	60	60
5	Jorien Voorhuis	(Netherlands)	7	i	4:05.95	50	50
6	Claudia Pechstein	(Germany)	8	o	4:07.64	45	—
7	Ivanie Blondin	(Canada)	7	o	4:09.35	40	
8	Nana Takagi	(Japan)	2	i	4:10.25	35	
9	Bente Kraus	(Germany)	5	i	4:13.69	30	
10	Kim Bo-reum	(South Korea)	5	o	4:13.78	25	
11	Anna Chernova	(Russia)	3	o	4:15.63	21	
12	Shoko Fujimura	(Japan)	3	i	4:15.90	18	
13	Jelena Peeters	(Belgium)	2	o	4:16.15	16	
14	Ayaka Kikuchi	(Japan)	1	o	4:16.20	14	
15	Yuliya Skokova	(Russia)	6	o	4:16.60	12	
16	Stephanie Beckert	(Germany)	1	i	4:17.96	10	

=== Division B ===
Rank	Name	Nat.	Pair	Lane	Time	WC points
1	Carlijn Achtereekte	(Netherlands)	4	i	4:00.80	32
2	Carien Kleibeuker	(Netherlands)	4	o	4:03.79	27
3	Katarzyna Woźniak	(Poland)	11	i	4:12.67	23
4	Francesca Lollobrigida	(Italy)	6	o	4:13.01	19
5	Marina Zueva	(Belarus)	2	o	4:13.21 NR	15
6	Isabell Ost	(Germany)	3	i	4:13.33	11
7	Zhao Xin	(China)	10	i	4:14.29	9
8	Natalya Voronina	(Russia)	13	i	4:14.45	7
9	Liu Jing	(China)	8	o	4:15.37	6
10	Saskia Alusalu	(Estonia)	3	o	4:15.41 NR	5
11	Aleksandra Goss	(Poland)	9	o	4:15.42	4
12	Josie Spence	(Canada)	8	i	4:16.30	3
13	Jennifer Bay	(Germany)	5	o	4:16.94	2
14	Risa Takayama	(Japan)	12	o	4:17.18	1
15	Maki Tabata	(Japan)	13	o	4:17.44	—
16	Park Cho-weon	(South Korea)	9	i	4:17.66	
17	Lauren McGuire	(Canada)	7	i	4:19.75	
18	Jun Ye-jin	(South Korea)	10	o	4:20.24	
19	Maria Lamb	(United States)	12	i	4:20.27	
20	Urszula Włodarczyk	(Poland)	7	o	4:20.83	
21	Angelika Fudalej	(Poland)	6	i	4:20.95	
22	Carlijn Schoutens	(United States)	2	i	4:22.02	
23	Nikola Zdráhalová	(Czech Republic)	5	i	4:23.97	
24	Eva Lagrange	(Sweden)	1	o	4:27.21	
25	Elena Møller-Rigas	(Denmark)	1	i	4:32.70	
26	Luiza Złotkowska	(Poland)	11	o	DNF	

Notes: NR = national record.
