= 2014–15 ISU Speed Skating World Cup – World Cup 1 – Women's team pursuit =

The women's team pursuit race of the 2014–15 ISU Speed Skating World Cup 1, arranged in the Meiji Hokkaido-Tokachi Oval, in Obihiro, Japan, was held on 15 November 2014.

The Dutch team won the race, while the Japanese team came second, and the German team came third.

== Results ==
The race took place on Saturday, 15 November, in the afternoon session, scheduled at 17:32.

Rank	Country	Skaters	Pair	Lane	Time	WC points
1st place, gold medalist(s)	Netherlands	Ireen Wüst; Marrit Leenstra; Marije Joling	5	i	3:02.54	100
2nd place, silver medalist(s)	Japan	Nana Takagi; Ayaka Kikuchi; Maki Tabata	4	i	3:04.78	80
3rd place, bronze medalist(s)	Germany	Claudia Pechstein; Bente Kraus; Gabriele Hirschbichler	2	o	3:06.51	70
4	Canada	Ivanie Blondin; Kali Christ; Josie Spence	4	o	3:06.66	60
5	Poland	Luiza Złotkowska; Katarzyna Woźniak; Aleksandra Goss	5	o	3:07.37	50
6	Russia	Olga Graf; Yuliya Skokova; Margarita Ryzhova	3	o	3:08.56	45
7	China	Zhao Xin; Liu Jing; Liu Yichi	2	i	3:10.66	40
8	Czech Republic	Martina Sáblíková; Nikola Zdráhalová; Natálie Kerschbaummayr	1	i	3:13.78	35
9	South Korea	Kim Bo-reum; Jun Ye-jin; Noh Seon-yeong	3	i	3:15.39	30
