= 2014–15 ISU Speed Skating World Cup – World Cup 1 – Men's 1500 metres =

The men's 1500 metres race of the 2014–15 ISU Speed Skating World Cup 1, arranged in the Meiji Hokkaido-Tokachi Oval, in Obihiro, Japan, was held on 16 November 2014.

The competition saw an all-Dutch podium, as Kjeld Nuis of won, followed by Wouter olde Heuvel of in second place, and Koen Verweij in third place. Li Bailin of China won Division B.

== Results ==
The race took place on Sunday, 16 November, with Division B scheduled in the morning session, at 11:25, and Division A scheduled in the afternoon session, at 15:23.

=== Division A ===
Rank	Name	Nat.	Pair	Lane	Time	WC points	GWC points
1st place, gold medalist(s)	Kjeld Nuis	(Netherlands)	6	o	1:45.97	100	100
2nd place, silver medalist(s)	Wouter olde Heuvel	(Netherlands)	2	i	1:46.52	80	80
3rd place, bronze medalist(s)	Koen Verweij	(Netherlands)	8	i	1:46.90	70	70
4	Denny Morrison	(Canada)	8	o	1:47.05	60	60
5	Shani Davis	(United States)	9	o	1:47.34	50	50
6	Konrad Niedźwiedzki	(Poland)	5	i	1:47.39	45	—
7	Jan Szymański	(Poland)	1	o	1:47.61	40	
8	Sven Kramer	(Netherlands)	9	i	1:47.68	36	
9	Thomas Krol	(Netherlands)	5	o	1:47.80	32	
10	Sverre Lunde Pedersen	(Norway)	7	i	1:47.81	28	
11	Pavel Kulizhnikov	(Russia)	3	o	1:48.18	24	
12	Bart Swings	(Belgium)	4	i	1:48.43	21	
13	Mikhail Kozlov	(Russia)	2	o	1:48.94	18	
14	Zbigniew Bródka	(Poland)	10	o	1:49.22	16	
15	Denis Kuzin	(Kazakhstan)	3	i	1:49.38	14	
16	Jeffrey Swider-Peltz	(United States)	7	o	1:49.98	12	
17	Benjamin Macé	(France)	4	o	1:50.46	10	
18	Håvard Holmefjord Lorentzen	(Norway)	6	i	1:50.56	8	
19	Sergey Gryaztsov	(Russia)	10	i	1:50.71	6	
20	Aleksey Suvorov	(Russia)	1	i	1:51.68	5	

=== Division B ===
Rank	Name	Nat.	Pair	Lane	Time	WC points
1	Li Bailin	(China)	7	o	1:48.44	25
2	Lee Seung-hoon	(South Korea)	8	i	1:48.90	19
3	Alec Janssens	(Canada)	7	i	1:49.46	15
4	Kim Miung-seok	(South Korea)	4	o	1:49.47	11
5	Bram Smallenbroek	(Austria)	10	o	1:49.87	8
6	Konrád Nagy	(Hungary)	12	i	1:49.93	6
7	Kim Jin-su	(South Korea)	1	i	1:50.14	4
8	Vincent De Haître	(Canada)	12	o	1:50.21	2
9	Liu Yiming	(China)	4	i	1:50.32	1
10	Shota Nakamura	(Japan)	3	o	1:50.33	—
11	Takuro Oda	(Japan)	3	i	1:50.34	
12	Kirill Golubev	(Russia)	11	i	1:50.63	
13	Denis Dressel	(Germany)	5	i	1:50.82	
14	Shane Williamson	(Japan)	8	o	1:50.91	
15	Maksim Baklashkin	(Kazakhstan)	1	o	1:50.99	
16	Luca Stefani	(Italy)	2	i	1:51.14	
17	Yota Konno	(Japan)	9	o	1:51.22	
18	Roland Cieslak	(Poland)	9	i	1:52.06	
19	Tyler Derraugh	(Canada)	10	i	1:52.28	
20	Alexej Baumgärtner	(Germany)	6	o	1:52.34	
21	Andrea Giovannini	(Italy)	5	o	1:52.52	
22	Mirko Giacomo Nenzi	(Italy)	11	o	1:53.53	
23	Aleksandr Zhigin	(Kazakhstan)	6	i	1:53.73	
24	Daichi Yamanaka	(Japan)	2	o	1:55.48	
