= 2014–15 ISU Speed Skating World Cup – World Cup 1 – Men's team pursuit =

The men's team pursuit race of the 2014–15 ISU Speed Skating World Cup 1, arranged in the Meiji Hokkaido-Tokachi Oval, in Obihiro, Japan, was held on 15 November 2014.

The Dutch team won the race, while the South Korean team came second, and the Russian team came third.

== Results ==
The race took place on Saturday, 15 November, in the afternoon session, scheduled at 16:23.

Rank	Country	Skaters	Pair	Lane	Time	WC points
1st place, gold medalist(s)	Netherlands	Sven Kramer; Wouter olde Heuvel; Douwe de Vries	5	i	3:43.68	100
2nd place, silver medalist(s)	South Korea	Lee Seung-hoon; Kim Cheol-min; Ko Byung-wook	2	i	3:47.15	80
3rd place, bronze medalist(s)	Russia	Aleksandr Rumyantsev; Danila Semerikov; Danil Sinitsyn	7	o	3:48.22	70
4	Poland	Zbigniew Bródka; Jan Szymański; Konrad Niedźwiedzki	5	o	3:48.66	60
5	Japan	Shane Williamson; Shota Nakamura; Takuro Ogawa	5	i	3:51.53	50
6	Austria	Armin Hager; Linus Heidegger; Bram Smallenbroek	6	o	3:52.24	45
7	Italy	Nicola Tumolero; Andrea Giovannini; Luca Stefani	6	i	3:52.68	40
8	Germany	Patrick Beckert; Alexej Baumgärtner; Denis Dressel	4	o	3:54.01	35
9	Canada	Jordan Belchos; Stefan Waples; Alec Janssens	3	i	3:55.13	30
10	China	Liu Yiming; Rehanbai Talabuhan; Li Bailin	4	i	3:56.04	25
