= 2014–15 ISU Speed Skating World Cup – World Cup 1 – Men's mass start =

The men's mass start race of the 2014–15 ISU Speed Skating World Cup 1, arranged in the Meiji Hokkaido-Tokachi Oval in Obihiro, Japan, was held on 16 November 2014.

Lee Seung-hoon of South Korea won the race, while Kim Cheol-min of South Korea came second, and Bart Swings of Belgium came third.

== Results ==
The race took place on Sunday, 16 November, scheduled in the afternoon session, at 17:45.

				Race points							
Rank	Name	Nat.	Laps	Split 1	Split 2	Split 3	Finish	Total	Time	WC points	GWC points
1st place, gold medalist(s)	Lee Seung-hoon	(South Korea)	16				60	60	8:16.99	100	100
2nd place, silver medalist(s)	Kim Cheol-min	(South Korea)	16				40	40	8:17.23	80	80
3rd place, bronze medalist(s)	Bart Swings	(Belgium)	16				20	20	8:17.28	70	70
4	Alexej Baumgärtner	(Germany)	16	5		3		8	8:26.57	60	60
5	Patrick Beckert	(Germany)	16			5		5	8:20.62	50	50
6	Shane Williamson	(Japan)	16		5			5	8:24.14	45	—
7	Andrea Giovannini	(Italy)	16		3	1		4	8:30.72	40	
8	Linus Heidegger	(Austria)	16	3				3	8:24.01	36	
9	Nicola Tumolero	(Italy)	16	1				1	8:20.15	32	
10	Douwe de Vries	(Netherlands)	16		1			1	8:20.43	28	
11	Robert Watson	(Canada)	16					0	8:17.63	24	
12	Jeffrey Swider-Peltz	(United States)	16					0	8:17.84	21	
13	Danila Semerikov	(Russia)	16					0	8:18.34	18	
14	Gerben Jorritsma	(Netherlands)	16					0	8:18.77	16	
15	Rehanbai Talabuhan	(China)	16					0	8:19.24	14	
16	Armin Hager	(Austria)	16					0	8:21.62	12	
17	Roland Cieslak	(Poland)	16					0	8:23.75	10	
18	Liu Yiming	(China)	16					0	8:23.92	8	
19	Ryosuke Tsuchiya	(Japan)	16					0	8:24.23	6	
20	Martin Hänggi	(Switzerland)	16					0	8:27.99	5	
21	Yevgeny Seryaev	(Russia)	16					0	8:38.99	4	
22	Jan Szymański	(Poland)	15					0	8:37.96	3	
