= 2014–15 ISU Speed Skating World Cup – World Cup 7 – Women's mass start =

The women's mass start race of the 2014–15 ISU Speed Skating World Cup 7, arranged in the Gunda Niemann-Stirnemann-Halle in Erfurt, Germany, was held on 22 March 2015.

== Results ==
The race took place on Saturday, 22 March, scheduled in the afternoon session, at 17:11.

				Race points							
Rank	Name	Nat.	Laps	Split 1	Split 2	Split 3	Finish	Total	Time	WC points	GWC points
1st place, gold medalist(s)	Martina Sáblíková	(Czech Republic)	16		3	5	60	68	9:01.76	150	150
2nd place, silver medalist(s)	Nana Takagi	(Japan)	16				40	40	9:16.52	120	120
3rd place, bronze medalist(s)	Francesca Lollobrigida	(Italy)	16	5			20	25	9:16.61	106	106
4	Heather Richardson	(United States)	16		5	3		8	9:20.79	90	90
5	Bente Kraus	(Germany)	16	3				3	9:20.99	76	76
6	Miho Takagi	(Japan)	16			1		1	9:17.51	45	—
7	Nikola Zdráhalová	(Czech Republic)	16	1				1	9:19.89	40	
8	Ivanie Blondin	(Canada)	16					0	9:16.80	36	
9	Vanessa Bittner	(Austria)	16					0	9:16.96	32	
10	Mariska Huisman	(Netherlands)	16					0	9:17.08	28	
11	Liu Yichi	(China)	16					0	9:17.25	24	
12	Claudia Pechstein	(Germany)	16					0	9:17.26	21	
13	Liu Jing	(China)	16					0	9:17.64	18	
14	Jelena Peeters	(Belgium)	16					0	9:19.75	16	
15	Brittany Bowe	(United States)	16					0	9:23.46	14	
16	Irene Schouten	(Netherlands)	15		1			0	8:49.68	12	
