= 2014–15 ISU Speed Skating World Cup – World Cup 4 – Women's 3000 metres =

The women's 3000 metres race of the 2014–15 ISU Speed Skating World Cup 4, arranged in the Thialf arena in Heerenveen, Netherlands, was held on 12 December 2014.

Martina Sáblíková of the Czech Republic won, followed by Ireen Wüst of the Netherlands in second place, and Carlijn Achtereekte of the Netherlands in third place. Ida Njåtun of Norway won Division B.

== Results ==
The race took place on Friday, 12 December, with Division B scheduled in the morning session, at 13:34, and Division A scheduled in the afternoon session, at 16:00.

=== Division A ===
| Rank | Name | Nat. | Pair | Lane | Time | WC points | GWC points |
|---|---|---|---|---|---|---|---|
| 1st place, gold medalist(s) | Martina Sáblíková | (Czech Republic) | 8 | i | 4:02.84 | 100 | 100 |
| 2nd place, silver medalist(s) | Ireen Wüst | (Netherlands) | 8 | o | 4:03.14 | 80 | 80 |
| 3rd place, bronze medalist(s) | Carlijn Achtereekte | (Netherlands) | 1 | i | 4:05.95 | 70 | 70 |
| 4 | Ivanie Blondin | (Canada) | 6 | i | 4:06.33 | 60 | 60 |
| 5 | Claudia Pechstein | (Germany) | 7 | i | 4:07.16 | 50 | 50 |
| 6 | Olga Graf | (Russia) | 5 | i | 4:08.24 | 45 | — |
| 7 | Marije Joling | (Netherlands) | 6 | o | 4:08.62 | 40 | |
| 8 | Carien Kleibeuker | (Netherlands) | 1 | o | 4:08.66 | 35 | |
| 9 | Jorien Voorhuis | (Netherlands) | 7 | o | 4:08.92 | 30 | |
| 10 | Nana Takagi | (Japan) | 3 | i | 4:09.72 | 25 | |
| 11 | Anna Chernova | (Russia) | 2 | i | 4:11.93 | 21 | |
| 12 | Bente Kraus | (Germany) | 5 | o | 4:12.22 | 18 | |
| 13 | Kim Bo-reum | (South Korea) | 4 | o | 4:13.61 | 16 | |
| 14 | Katarzyna Woźniak | (Poland) | 2 | o | 4:15.05 | 14 | |
| 15 | Yuliya Skokova | (Russia) | 4 | i | 4:19.03 | 12 | |
| 16 | Shoko Fujimura | (Japan) | 3 | o | 4:19.58 | 10 | |

=== Division B ===
| Rank | Name | Nat. | Pair | Lane | Time | WC points |
|---|---|---|---|---|---|---|
| 1 | Ida Njåtun | (Norway) | 12 | i | 4:11.24 | 32 |
| 2 | Luiza Złotkowska | (Poland) | 9 | i | 4:11.42 | 27 |
| 3 | Natalya Voronina | (Russia) | 12 | o | 4:12.46 | 23 |
| 4 | Ayaka Kikuchi | (Japan) | 13 | o | 4:12.53 | 19 |
| 5 | Isabell Ost | (Germany) | 9 | o | 4:12.76 | 15 |
| 6 | Zhao Xin | (China) | 11 | i | 4:12.89 | 11 |
| 7 | Liu Jing | (China) | 7 | o | 4:13.61 | 9 |
| 8 | Kali Christ | (Canada) | 2 | i | 4:13.77 | 7 |
| 9 | Jelena Peeters | (Belgium) | 13 | i | 4:14.13 | 6 |
| 10 | Maki Tabata | (Japan) | 10 | i | 4:15.24 | 5 |
| 11 | Risa Takayama | (Japan) | 10 | o | 4:15.91 | 4 |
| 12 | Francesca Lollobrigida | (Italy) | 11 | o | 4:16.36 | 3 |
| 13 | Saskia Alusalu | (Estonia) | 6 | i | 4:18.92 | 2 |
| 14 | Aleksandra Goss | (Poland) | 8 | o | 4:19.05 | 1 |
| 15 | Angelika Fudalej | (Poland) | 5 | o | 4:19.39 | — |
| 16 | Park Cho-weon | (South Korea) | 7 | i | 4:20.02 | |
| 17 | Urszula Włodarczyk | (Poland) | 5 | i | 4:20.57 | |
| 18 | Jun Ye-jin | (South Korea) | 8 | i | 4:21.54 | |
| 19 | Carlijn Schoutens | (United States) | 4 | i | 4:21.65 | |
| 20 | Nikola Zdráhalová | (Czech Republic) | 4 | o | 4:21.68 | |
| 21 | Roxanne Dufter | (Germany) | 2 | o | 4:21.94 | |
| 22 | Lauren McGuire | (Canada) | 6 | o | 4:22.58 | |
| 23 | Eva Lagrange | (Sweden) | 3 | i | 4:23.77 | |
| 24 | Elena Møller-Rigas | (Denmark) | 3 | o | 4:26.77 | |
| 25 | Jaclyn Rowe | (United States) | 1 | i | 4:35.77 | |
