= 2014–15 ISU Speed Skating World Cup – World Cup 7 – Men's mass start =

The men's mass start race of the 2014–15 ISU Speed Skating World Cup 7, arranged in the Gunda Niemann-Stirnemann-Halle in Erfurt, Germany, was held on 22 March 2015.

== Results ==
The race took place on Sunday, 22 March, scheduled in the afternoon session, at 16:46.

				Race points							
Rank	Name	Nat.	Laps	Split 1	Split 2	Split 3	Finish	Total	Time	WC points	GWC points
1st place, gold medalist(s)	Bart Swings	(Belgium)	16			5	60	65	8:10.29	150	150
2nd place, silver medalist(s)	Jorrit Bergsma	(Netherlands)	16			1	40	41	8:10.31	120	120
3rd place, bronze medalist(s)	Sverre Lunde Pedersen	(Norway)	16			3	20	23	8:11.43	106	106
4	Marco Weber	(Germany)	16	5				5	8:20.48	90	90
5	Andrea Giovannini	(Italy)	16		5			5	8:24.34	76	76
6	Alexej Baumgärtner	(Germany)	16		3			3	8:19.85	45	—
7	Armin Hager	(Austria)	16	3				3	8:30.64	40	
8	Ryosuke Tsuchiya	(Japan)	16	1				1	8:19.92	36	
9	Shane Williamson	(Japan)	16		1			1	8:22.64	32	
10	Arjan Stroetinga	(Netherlands)	16					0	8:16.20	28	
11	Sun Longjiang	(China)	16					0	8:16.25	24	
12	Nicola Tumolero	(Italy)	16					0	8:18.89	21	
13	Linus Heidegger	(Austria)	16					0	8:22.35	18	
