= 2014–15 ISU Speed Skating World Cup – World Cup 7 =

The seventh competition weekend of the 2014–15 ISU Speed Skating World Cup will be held in the Gunda Niemann-Stirnemann-Halle in Erfurt, Germany, from Saturday, 21 March, until Sunday, 22 March 2015.

== Schedule ==
The detailed schedule of events:

Date	Session	Events	Comment
Saturday, 21 March	Afternoon	13:55: 500 m women (1); 14:18: 500 m men (1); 14:56: 1500 m women 15:49: 1000 m men 16:28: 5000 m men	Division A
Sunday, 22 March	Afternoon	13:00: 3000 m women 14:08: 500 m women (2); 14:31: 500 m men (2); 15:13: 1000 m women 16:08: 1500 m men	Division A
Sunday, 22 March	Afternoon	16:46: Mass start men 17:11: Mass start women	

All times are CET (UTC+1).

== Medal summary ==
=== Men's events ===
Event	Race #	Gold	Time	Silver	Time	Bronze	Time	Report
500 m	1	Pavel Kulizhnikov; Russia	34.71	Michel Mulder; Netherlands	34.94	Gerben Jorritsma; Netherlands	35.25	
500 m	2	Ruslan Murashov; Russia	34.97	Laurent Dubreuil; Canada; Michel Mulder; Netherlands	35.109 35.109			
1000 m		Denny Morrison; Canada	1:09.07	Kjeld Nuis; Netherlands	1:09.42	Vincent De Haître; Canada	1:09.47	
1500 m		Denny Morrison; Canada	1:46.15	Sverre Lunde Pedersen; Norway	1:46.51	Bart Swings; Belgium	1:46.81	
5000 m		Jorrit Bergsma; Netherlands	6:17.49	Sverre Lunde Pedersen; Norway	6:20.64	Patrick Beckert; Germany	6:21.80	
Mass start		Bart Swings; Belgium	65 ^{A}	Jorrit Bergsma; Netherlands	41 ^{A}	Sverre Lunde Pedersen; Norway	23 ^{A}	

^{A} In mass start, race points are accumulated during the race. The skater with most race points is the winner.

=== Women's events ===
Event	Race #	Gold	Time	Silver	Time	Bronze	Time	Report
500 m	1	Heather Richardson; United States	37.80	Brittany Bowe; United States	37.93	Yekaterina Aydova; Kazakhstan	38.15	
500 m	2	Heather Richardson; United States	37.77	Brittany Bowe; United States	37.97	Nao Kodaira; Japan	38.49	
1000 m		Brittany Bowe; United States	1:14.61	Heather Richardson; United States	1:15.13	Marrit Leenstra; Netherlands	1:15.78	
1500 m		Brittany Bowe; United States	1:55.88	Heather Richardson; United States	1:55.99	Martina Sáblíková; Czech Republic	1:56.74	
3000 m		Martina Sáblíková; Czech Republic	4:04.06	Marije Joling; Netherlands	4:05.64	Diane Valkenburg; Netherlands	4:07.85	
Mass start		Martina Sáblíková; Czech Republic	68 ^{A}	Nana Takagi; Japan	40 ^{A}	Francesca Lollobrigida; Italy	25 ^{A}	

^{A} In mass start, race points are accumulated during the race. The skater with most race points is the winner.
