= 2014–15 ISU Speed Skating World Cup – World Cup 7 – Men's 500 metres =

The men's 500 metres races of the 2014–15 ISU Speed Skating World Cup 7, arranged in the Gunda Niemann-Stirnemann-Halle in Erfurt, Germany, was held on the weekend of 21–22 March 2015.

== Race 1 ==
Race one took place on Saturday, 21 March, scheduled in the afternoon session, at 14:18.

Rank	Name	Nat.	Pair	Lane	Time	WC points	GWC points
1st place, gold medalist(s)	Pavel Kulizhnikov	(Russia)	9	i	34.71	150	75
2nd place, silver medalist(s)	Michel Mulder	(Netherlands)	6	o	34.94	120	60
3rd place, bronze medalist(s)	Gerben Jorritsma	(Netherlands)	2	o	35.25	106	53
4	Laurent Dubreuil	(Canada)	9	o	35.26	90	45
5	Aleksey Yesin	(Russia)	5	o	35.302	76	38
6	Ruslan Murashov	(Russia)	7	o	35.303	45	—
7	Espen Aarnes Hvammen	(Norway)	6	i	35.34	40	
8	Nico Ihle	(Germany)	8	o	35.42	36	
9	Pim Schipper	(Netherlands)	4	i	35.44	32	
10	Mu Zhongsheng	(China)	1	i	35.48	28	
11	Keiichiro Nagashima	(Japan)	4	o	35.518	24	
12	Yūya Oikawa	(Japan)	2	i	35.519	21	
13	Artur Waś	(Poland)	8	i	35.53	18	
14	Mika Poutala	(Finland)	3	i	35.57	16	
15	Jan Smeekens	(Netherlands)	7	i	35.58	14	
16	Xie Jiaxuan	(China)	1	o	35.832	12	
17	Mirko Giacomo Nenzi	(Italy)	3	o	35.834	10	
18	Ryohei Haga	(Japan)	5	i	35.94	8	

== Race 2 ==
Race two took place on Sunday, 22 March, scheduled at 14:31.

Rank	Name	Nat.	Pair	Lane	Time	WC points	GWC points
1st place, gold medalist(s)	Ruslan Murashov	(Russia)	5	i	34.97	150	75
2nd place, silver medalist(s)	Laurent Dubreuil	(Canada)	7	i	35.109	120	60
2nd place, silver medalist(s)	Michel Mulder	(Russia)	9	i	35.109	120	60
4	Nico Ihle	(Germany)	4	i	35.15	90	45
5	Espen Aarnes Hvammen	(Norway)	9	o	35.20	76	38
6	Mika Poutala	(Finland)	4	o	35.23	45	—
7	Jan Smeekens	(Netherlands)	3	o	35.28	40	
8	Artur Waś	(Poland)	5	o	35.40	36	
9	Aleksey Yesin	(Russia)	6	i	35.47	32	
10	Gerben Jorritsma	(Netherlands)	8	i	35.48	28	
11	Yūya Oikawa	(Japan)	6	o	35.59	24	
12	Pim Schipper	(Netherlands)	8	o	35.68	21	
13	Keiichiro Nagashima	(Japan)	3	i	35.73	18	
14	Mu Zhongsheng	(China)	7	o	35.81	16	
15	Ryohei Haga	(Japan)	2	o	35.88	14	
16	Mirko Giacomo Nenzi	(Italy)	1	i	35.89	12	
17	Xie Jiaxuan	(China)	2	i	35.90	10	
