= 2014–15 ISU Speed Skating World Cup – World Cup 7 – Women's 500 metres =

The women's 500 metres races of the 2014–15 ISU Speed Skating World Cup 7, arranged in the Gunda Niemann-Stirnemann-Halle in Erfurt, Germany, was held on the weekend of 21–22 March 2015.

== Race 1 ==
Race one took place on Saturday, 21 March, scheduled in the morning session, at 13:55.

Rank	Name	Nat.	Pair	Lane	Time	WC points	GWC points
1st place, gold medalist(s)	Heather Richardson	(United States)	8	o	37.80	150	75
2nd place, silver medalist(s)	Brittany Bowe	(United States)	5	i	37.93	120	60
3rd place, bronze medalist(s)	Yekaterina Aydova	(Kazakhstan)	4	i	38.15	106	53
4	Nao Kodaira	(Japan)	9	i	38.24	90	45
5	Thijsje Oenema	(Netherlands)	7	o	38.40	76	38
6	Li Qishi	(China)	3	o	38.56	45	—
7	Karolína Erbanová	(Czech Republic)	7	i	38.67	40	
8	Margot Boer	(Netherlands)	8	i	38.89	36	
9	Miyako Sumiyoshi	(Japan)	3	i	38.92	32	
10	Vanessa Bittner	(Austria)	6	o	38.99	28	
11	Maki Tsuji	(Japan)	5	o	39.06	24	
12	Floor van den Brandt	(Netherlands)	6	i	39.07	21	
13	Judith Hesse	(Germany)	9	o	39.17	18	
14	Bo van der Werff	(Netherlands)	4	o	39.22	16	
15	Yvonne Daldossi	(Italy)	1	i	39.424	14	
16	Arisa Go	(Japan)	2	i	39.428	12	
17	Li Huawei	(China)	2	o	39.46	10	

== Race 2 ==
Race two took place on Sunday, 22 March, scheduled at 14:08.

Rank	Name	Nat.	Pair	Lane	Time	WC points	GWC points
1st place, gold medalist(s)	Heather Richardson	(United States)	8	i	37.77	150	75
2nd place, silver medalist(s)	Brittany Bowe	(United States)	8	o	37.97	120	60
3rd place, bronze medalist(s)	Nao Kodaira	(Japan)	6	o	38.49	106	53
4	Yekaterina Aydova	(Kazakhstan)	7	o	38.74	90	45
5	Karolína Erbanová	(Czech Republic)	5	o	38.78	76	38
6	Floor van den Brandt	(Netherlands)	2	o	38.83	45	—
7	Vanessa Bittner	(Austria)	6	i	38.92	40	
8	Thijsje Oenema	(Netherlands)	7	i	38.94	36	
9	Maki Tsuji	(Japan)	5	i	38.99	32	
10	Miyako Sumiyoshi	(Japan)	3	o	39.07	28	
11	Yvonne Daldossi	(Italy)	1	i	39.25	24	
12	Judith Hesse	(Germany)	4	i	39.34	21	
13	Bo van der Werff	(Netherlands)	3	i	39.37	18	
14	Li Huawei	(China)	2	i	39.57	16	
15	Arisa Go	(Japan)	1	o	39.91	14	
16	Margot Boer	(Germany)	4	o	DQ		
