= 2014–15 ISU Speed Skating World Cup – World Cup 7 – Men's 1000 metres =

The men's 1000 metres race of the 2014–15 ISU Speed Skating World Cup 7, arranged in the Gunda Niemann-Stirnemann-Halle in Erfurt, Germany, will be held on 21 March 2015.

== Result ==
The race will take place on Saturday, 21 March, scheduled in the afternoon session, at 15:49.

Rank	Name	Nat.	Pair	Lane	Time	WC points	GWC points
1st place, gold medalist(s)	Denny Morrison	(Canada)	4	o	1:09.07	150	150
2nd place, silver medalist(s)	Kjeld Nuis	(Netherlands)	6	o	1:09.42	120	120
3rd place, bronze medalist(s)	Vincent De Haître	(Canada)	3	i	1:09.47	106	106
4	Pavel Kulizhnikov	(Russia)	6	i	1:09.52	90	90
5	Nico Ihle	(Germany)	5	i	1:09.55	76	76
6	Håvard Holmefjord Lorentzen	(Norway)	3	o	1:09.67	45	—
7	Pim Schipper	(Netherlands)	2	o	1:09.73	40	
8	Michel Mulder	(Netherlands)	1	i	1:10.14	36	
9	Aleksey Yesin	(Russia)	4	i	1:10.49	32	
10	Stefan Groothuis	(Netherlands)	5	o	1:10.62	28	
11	Yang Fan	(China)	2	i	1:11.95	24	
