= 2014–15 ISU Speed Skating World Cup – World Cup 1 – Men's 5000 metres =

The men's 5000 metres race of the 2014–15 ISU Speed Skating World Cup 1, arranged in the Meiji Hokkaido-Tokachi Oval, in Obihiro, Japan, was held on 14 November 2014.

Sven Kramer of the Netherlands won, followed by Aleksandr Rumyantsev of Russia in second place, and Wouter olde Heuvel of the Netherlands in third place. Jan Szymański of Poland won Division B.

== Results ==
The race took place on Friday, 14 November, with Division B scheduled in the morning session, at 10:54, and Division A scheduled in the afternoon session, at 15:00.

=== Division A ===
Rank	Name	Nat.	Pair	Lane	Time	WC points	GWC points
1st place, gold medalist(s)	Sven Kramer	(Netherlands)	8	o	6:20.90	100	100
2nd place, silver medalist(s)	Aleksandr Rumyantsev	(Russia)	5	i	6:23.56	80	80
3rd place, bronze medalist(s)	Wouter olde Heuvel	(Netherlands)	7	o	6:24.03	70	70
4	Bob de Jong	(Netherlands)	5	o	6:25.95	60	60
5	Patrick Beckert	(Germany)	7	i	6:27.64	50	50
6	Koen Verweij	(Netherlands)	3	o	6:28.62	45	—
7	Douwe de Vries	(Netherlands)	6	o	6:28.78	40	
8	Sverre Lunde Pedersen	(Norway)	8	i	6:28.99	35	
9	Lee Seung-hoon	(South Korea)	6	i	6:30.12	30	
10	Bart Swings	(Belgium)	3	i	6:30.65	25	
11	Danila Semerikov	(Russia)	2	o	6:33.55	21	
12	Yevgeny Seryaev	(Russia)	4	i	6:34.96	18	
13	Alexej Baumgärtner	(Germany)	4	o	6:36.51	16	
14	Danil Sinitsyn	(Russia)	1	i	6:36.98	14	
15	Sergey Gryaztsov	(Russia)	1	o	6:42.74	12	
16	Maksim Baklashkin	(Kazakhstan)	2	i	6:59.35	10	

=== Division B ===
Rank	Name	Nat.	Pair	Lane	Time	WC points
1	Jan Szymański	(Poland)	10	i	6:29.51	32
2	Andrea Giovannini	(Italy)	10	o	6:35.58	27
3	Jordan Belchos	(Canada)	9	o	6:37.60	23
4	Takuro Ogawa	(Japan)	3	i	6:41.36	19
5	Liu Yiming	(China)	3	o	6:41.45	15
6	Kim Cheol-min	(South Korea)	6	o	6:41.46	11
7	Shane Williamson	(Japan)	5	i	6:43.49	9
8	Masahito Obayashi	(Japan)	5	o	6:44.48	7
9	Stefan Waples	(Canada)	7	i	6:44.56	6
10	Adrian Wielgat	(Poland)	7	o	6:45.88	5
11	Ko Byung-wook	(South Korea)	4	i	6:47.25	4
12	Nicola Tumolero	(Italy)	8	o	6:49.15	3
13	Linus Heidegger	(Austria)	6	i	6:49.51	2
14	Rehanbai Talabuhan	(China)	4	o	6:49.61	1
15	Roland Cieslak	(Poland)	9	i	6:49.71	—
16	Yuta Kiyama	(Japan)	1	i	6:50.90	
17	Shohya Ogawa	(Japan)	2	i	6:51.34	
18	Martin Hänggi	(Switzerland)	8	i	6:54.84	
19	Artur Sergiyenko	(Kazakhstan)	2	o	7:22.85	
