= 2014–15 ISU Speed Skating World Cup – World Cup 2 – Men's 10000 metres =

The men's 10000 metres race of the 2014–15 ISU Speed Skating World Cup 2, arranged in the Taereung International Ice Rink, in Seoul, South Korea, was held on 22 November 2014.

Bob de Jong of the Netherlands won the race, while Bart Swings of Belgium came second, and Aleksandr Rumyantsev of Russia came third. Erik Jan Kooiman of the Netherlands won the Division B race.

== Results ==
The race took place on Saturday, 22 November, with Division B scheduled in the morning session, at 09:00, and Division A scheduled in the afternoon session, from 13:45.

=== Division A ===
| Rank | Name | Nat. | Pair | Lane | Time | WC points | GWC points |
|---|---|---|---|---|---|---|---|
| 1st place, gold medalist(s) | Bob de Jong | (Netherlands) | 6 | o | 13:17.51 | 100 | 100 |
| 2nd place, silver medalist(s) | Bart Swings | (Belgium) | 2 | i | 13:32.45 | 80 | 80 |
| 3rd place, bronze medalist(s) | Aleksandr Rumyantsev | (Russia) | 6 | i | 13:37.59 | 70 | 70 |
| 4 | Sverre Lunde Pedersen | (Norway) | 4 | i | 13:40.35 | 60 | 60 |
| 5 | Patrick Beckert | (Germany) | 5 | i | 13:40.79 | 50 | 50 |
| 6 | Douwe de Vries | (Netherlands) | 5 | o | 13:40.93 | 45 | — |
| 7 | Yevgeny Seryaev | (Russia) | 1 | o | 13:47.22 | 40 | |
| 8 | Lee Seung-hoon | (South Korea) | 3 | i | 13:54.09 | 35 | |
| 9 | Jan Szymański | (Poland) | 4 | o | 14:01.36 | 30 | |
| 10 | Andrea Giovannini | (Italy) | 3 | o | 14:02.77 | 25 | |
| 11 | Danila Semerikov | (Russia) | 1 | i | 14:07.59 | 21 | |
| 12 | Jordan Belchos | (Canada) | 2 | o | 14:07.96 | 18 | |

=== Division B ===
| Rank | Name | Nat. | Pair | Lane | Time | WC points |
|---|---|---|---|---|---|---|
| 1 | Erik Jan Kooiman | (Netherlands) | 4 | i | 13:19.09 | 32 |
| 2 | Jouke Hoogeveen | (Netherlands) | 4 | o | 13:32.50 | 27 |
| 3 | Ted-Jan Bloemen | (Canada) | 5 | o | 13:35.77 | 23 |
| 4 | Alexej Baumgärtner | (Germany) | 9 | i | 13:40.33 | 19 |
| 5 | Frank Vreugdenhil | (Netherlands) | 3 | i | 13:47.74 | 15 |
| 6 | Danil Sinitsyn | (Russia) | 8 | i | 13:55.95 | 11 |
| 7 | Sergey Gryaztsov | (Russia) | 8 | o | 14:03.79 | 9 |
| 8 | Martin Hänggi | (Switzerland) | 5 | i | 14:04.66 | 7 |
| 9 | Luca Stefani | (Italy) | 2 | o | 14:07.54 | 6 |
| 10 | Shane Williamson | (Japan) | 7 | i | 14:08.09 | 5 |
| 11 | Masahito Obayashi | (Japan) | 7 | o | 14:08.14 | 4 |
| 12 | Sebastian Druszkiewicz | (Poland) | 3 | o | 14:09.78 | 3 |
| 13 | Liu Yiming | (China) | 9 | o | 14:14.74 | 2 |
| 14 | Edwin Park | (United States) | 2 | i | 14:17.93 | 1 |
| 15 | Ko Byung-wook | (South Korea) | 6 | i | 14:20.10 | — |
| 16 | Park Sung-kwang | (South Korea) | 1 | i | 14:46.68 | |
| 17 | Roland Cieslak | (Poland) | 6 | o | DQ | |
