= 2014–15 ISU Speed Skating World Cup – World Cup 7 – Men's 5000 metres =

The men's 5000 metres race of the 2014–15 ISU Speed Skating World Cup 7, arranged in the Gunda Niemann-Stirnemann-Halle in Erfurt, Germany, will be held on 21 March 2015.

== Result ==
The race will take place on Saturday, 21 March, scheduled in the afternoon session, at 16:28.

Rank	Name	Nat.	Pair	Lane	Time	WC points	GWC points
1st place, gold medalist(s)	Jorrit Bergsma	(Netherlands)	5	o	6:17.49	150	150
2nd place, silver medalist(s)	Sverre Lunde Pedersen	(Norway)	6	o	6:20.64	120	120
3rd place, bronze medalist(s)	Patrick Beckert	(Germany)	3	i	6:21.80	106	106
4	Bart Swings	(Belgium)	4	o	6:22.38	90	90
5	Wouter olde Heuvel	(Netherlands)	3	o	6:23.39	76	76
6	Bob de Jong	(Netherlands)	6	i	6:23.59	45	—
7	Aleksandr Rumyantsev	(Russia)	5	i	6:24.21	40	
8	Douwe de Vries	(Netherlands)	4	i	6:24.32	36	
9	Håvard Bøkko	(Norway)	1	i	6:28.77	32	
10	Andrea Giovannini	(Italy)	2	i	6:29.67	28	
11	Alexej Baumgärtner	(Germany)	2	o	6:38.26	24	
