= 2014–15 ISU Speed Skating World Cup – World Cup 3 – Men's 5000 metres =

The men's 5000 metres race of the 2014–15 ISU Speed Skating World Cup 3, arranged in Sportforum Hohenschönhausen, in Berlin, Germany, was held on 6 December 2014.

Jorrit Bergsma of the Netherlands won, followed by Sverre Lunde Pedersen of Norway in second place, and Douwe de Vries of the Netherlands in third place. Frank Vreugdenhil of the Netherlands won Division B.

== Results ==
The race took place on Saturday, 6 December, with both divisions in scheduled in the afternoon session, Division A at 14:13, and Division B at 17:00.

=== Division A ===
Rank	Name	Nat.	Pair	Lane	Time	WC points	GWC points
1st place, gold medalist(s)	Jorrit Bergsma	(Netherlands)	1	o	6:17.59	100	100
2nd place, silver medalist(s)	Sverre Lunde Pedersen	(Norway)	6	i	6:20.97	80	80
3rd place, bronze medalist(s)	Douwe de Vries	(Netherlands)	6	o	6:23.50	70	70
4	Bob de Jong	(Netherlands)	8	i	6:25.27	60	60
5	Bart Swings	(Belgium)	7	i	6:25.50	50	50
6	Aleksandr Rumyantsev	(Russia)	8	o	6:26.37	45	—
7	Lee Seung-hoon	(South Korea)	5	i	6:26.39	40	
8	Jan Szymański	(Poland)	5	o	6:27.72	35	
9	Patrick Beckert	(Germany)	7	o	6:28.16	30	
10	Ted-Jan Bloemen	(Canada)	1	i	6:29.89	25	
11	Andrea Giovannini	(Austria)	4	o	6:33.13	21	
12	Yevgeny Seryaev	(Russia)	4	i	6:33.14	18	
13	Danil Sinitsyn	(Russia)	2	o	6:33.25	16	
14	Alexej Baumgärtner	(Germany)	2	i	6:33.43	14	
15	Danila Semerikov	(Russia)	3	i	6:37.09	12	
16	Jordan Belchos	(Canada)	3	o	6:42.93	10	

=== Division B ===
Rank	Name	Nat.	Pair	Lane	Time	WC points
1	Frank Vreugdenhil	(Netherlands)	13	i	6:23.95	32
2	Alexis Contin	(France)	8	o	6:24.70	27
3	Arjan Stroetinga	(Netherlands)	4	i	6:25.12	23
4	Jonas Pflug	(Germany)	4	o	6:29.00	19
5	Marco Weber	(Germany)	6	o	6:29.75	15
6	Peter Michael	(New Zealand)	1	o	6:30.54	11
7	Shane Williamson	(Japan)	13	o	6:31.24	9
8	Nils van der Poel	(Sweden)	5	i	6:31.30	7
9	Fredrik van der Horst	(Norway)	7	o	6:31.78	6
10	Haralds Silovs	(Latvia)	6	i	6:33.53	5
11	Ole Bjørnsmoen Næss	(Norway)	3	o	6:34.13	4
12	Sergey Gryaztsov	(Russia)	14	i	6:37.12	3
13	Ko Byung-wook	(South Korea)	10	i	6:37.63	2
14	Aleksander Waagenes	(Norway)	5	o	6:38.04	1
15	Viktor Hald Thorup	(Denmark)	2	o	6:38.32	—
16	Luca Stefani	(Italy)	11	o	6:38.41	
17	Martin Hänggi	(Switzerland)	11	i	6:40.63	
18	Vitaly Mikhailov	(Belarus)	2	i	6:40.88	
19	Roland Cieslak	(Poland)	8	i	6:41.34	
20	Kim Cheol-min	(South Korea)	12	i	6:42.19	
21	Masahito Obayashi	(Japan)	12	o	6:43.38	
22	Linus Heidegger	(Austria)	9	i	6:44.58	
23	Rehanbai Talabuhan	(China)	9	o	6:45.38	
24	Sebastian Druszkiewicz	(Poland)	10	o	6:49.85	
25	Liu Yiming	(China)	14	o	6:50.06	
26	Felix Maly	(Germany)	3	i	6:55.27	
27	Reyon Kay	(New Zealand)	1	i	6:56.91	
28	Dmitry Babenko	(Kazakhstan)	7	i	DNF	
