= 2014–15 ISU Speed Skating World Cup – World Cup 5 – Men's 5000 metres =

The men's 5000 metres race of the 2014–15 ISU Speed Skating World Cup 5, arranged in the Vikingskipet arena in Hamar, Norway, was held on 31 January 2015.

Jorrit Bergsma of the Netherlands won, followed by Douwe de Vries of the Netherlands in second place, and Sverre Lunde Pedersen of Norway in third place. Alexis Contin of France won Division B.

== Results ==
The race took place on Saturday, 31 January, with Division B scheduled in the morning session, at 10:44, and Division A scheduled in the afternoon session, at 14:50.

=== Division A ===
Rank	Name	Nat.	Pair	Lane	Time	WC points	GWC points
1st place, gold medalist(s)	Jorrit Bergsma	(Netherlands)	6	i	6:17.89	100	100
2nd place, silver medalist(s)	Douwe de Vries	(Netherlands)	6	o	6:23.04	80	80
3rd place, bronze medalist(s)	Sverre Lunde Pedersen	(Norway)	7	i	6:23.21	70	70
4	Patrick Beckert	(Germany)	5	i	6:23.99	60	60
5	Denis Yuskov	(Russia)	1	o	6:24.20	50	50
6	Aleksandr Rumyantsev	(Russia)	8	o	6:25.15	45	—
7	Wouter olde Heuvel	(Netherlands)	5	o	6:25.67	40	
8	Bart Swings	(Belgium)	7	o	6:26.11	35	
9	Lee Seung-hoon	(South Korea)	4	i	6:28.82	30	
10	Håvard Bøkko	(Norway)	1	i	6:31.04	25	
11	Bob de Jong	(Netherlands)	8	i	6:31.68	21	
12	Yevgeny Seryaev	(Russia)	3	i	6:31.98	18	
13	Andrea Giovannini	(Italy)	3	o	6:34.12	16	
14	Jan Szymański	(Poland)	4	o	6:35.05	14	
15	Ted-Jan Bloemen	(Canada)	2	i	6:36.88	12	
16	Nils van der Poel	(Sweden)	2	o	6:40.08	10	

=== Division B ===
Rank	Name	Nat.	Pair	Lane	Time	WC points
1	Alexis Contin	(France)	19	i	6:23.68	32
2	Jos de Vos	(Netherlands)	8	o	6:26.75	27
3	Danil Sinitsyn	(Russia)	20	o	6:29.87	23
4	Konrad Niedźwiedzki	(Poland)	7	i	6:31.26	19
5	Simen Spieler Nilsen	(Norway)	7	o	6:32.35	15
6	Jonas Pflug	(Germany)	17	o	6:33.34	11
7	Alexej Baumgärtner	(Germany)	19	o	6:33.37	9
8	Fredrik van der Horst	(Norway)	13	o	6:33.63	7
9	Marco Weber	(Germany)	17	i	6:34.85	6
10	Sergey Gryaztsov	(Russia)	18	o	6:34.93	5
11	Zbigniew Bródka	(Poland)	5	o	6:34.94	4
12	Denny Morrison	(Canada)	4	i	6:35.09	3
13	Ole Bjørnsmoen Næss	(Norway)	15	o	6:38.76	2
14	Jordan Belchos	(Canada)	20	i	6:39.06	1
15	Bram Smallenbroek	(Austria)	5	i	6:40.33	—
16	Nicola Tumolero	(Italy)	11	o	6:40.51	
17	Shane Williamson	(Japan)	18	i	6:41.03	
18	Kim Cheol-min	(South Korea)	16	o	6:41.31	
19	Vitaly Mikhailov	(Belarus)	11	i	6:41.64	
20	Rehanbai Talabuhan	(China)	10	o	6:41.89	
21	K. C. Boutiette	(United States)	1	i	6:41.91	
22	Seitaro Ichinohe	(Japan)	6	i	6:42.40	
23	Piotr Puszkarski	(Poland)	9	o	6:42.95	
24	Alec Janssens	(Canada)	6	o	6:43.18	
25	Stefan Waples	(Canada)	12	i	6:44.40	
26	Konrád Nagy	(Poland)	4	o	6:44.93	
27	Liu Yiming	(China)	16	i	6:44.96	
28	Andrea Stefani	(Italy)	1	o	6:45.57	
29	Martin Hänggi	(Switzerland)	14	o	6:46.23	
30	Linus Heidegger	(Austria)	10	i	6:46.31	
31	Ko Byung-wook	(South Korea)	12	o	6:47.80	
32	Reyon Kay	(New Zealand)	8	i	6:48.43	
33	Viktor Hald Thorup	(Denmark)	15	i	6:48.79	
34	Maksim Baklashkin	(Kazakhstan)	14	i	6:49.64	
35	Tomoya Watanabe	(Japan)	3	i	6:49.69	
36	Luca Stefani	(Italy)	13	i	6:51.23	
37	Li Bailin	(China)	2	i	6:51.53	
38	Stefan Due Schmidt	(Denmark)	2	o	6:52.77	
39	Livio Wenger	(Switzerland)	3	o	6:53.37	
40	Roland Cieslak	(Poland)	9	i	7:00.41	
