= 2014–15 ISU Speed Skating World Cup – World Cup 7 – Women's 1500 metres =

The women's 1500 metres race of the 2014–15 ISU Speed Skating World Cup 7, arranged in the Gunda Niemann-Stirnemann-Halle in Erfurt, Germany, will be held on 21 March 2015.

== Result ==
The race took place on Saturday, 21 March, scheduled in the afternoon session, at 14:56.

Rank	Name	Nat.	Pair	Lane	Time	WC points	GWC points
1st place, gold medalist(s)	Brittany Bowe	(United States)	7	o	1:55.88	150	150
2nd place, silver medalist(s)	Heather Richardson	(United States)	8	o	1:55.99	120	120
3rd place, bronze medalist(s)	Martina Sáblíková	(Czech Republic)	6	i	1:56.74	106	106
4	Marrit Leenstra	(Netherlands)	8	i	1:57.45	90	90
5	Ida Njåtun	(Norway)	7	i	1:57.46	76	76
6	Marije Joling	(Netherlands)	6	o	1:58.00	45	—
7	Yuliya Skokova	(Russia)	5	o	1:58.23	40	
8	Olga Graf	(Russia)	4	i	1:59.16	36	
9	Linda de Vries	(Netherlands)	5	i	1:59.22	32	
10	Nana Takagi	(Japan)	3	i	1:59.72	28	
11	Ayaka Kikuchi	(Japan)	3	o	2:00.14	24	
12	Luiza Złotkowska	(Poland)	4	o	2:00.20	21	
13	Zhao Xin	(China)	2	i	2:00.89	18	
14	Gabriele Hirschbichler	(Germany)	2	o	2:01.27	16	
15	Carlijn Achtereekte	(Netherlands)	1	i	2:01.97	14	
