= 2014–15 ISU Speed Skating World Cup – World Cup 1 – Women's 500 metres =

The women's 500 metres races of the 2014–15 ISU Speed Skating World Cup 1, arranged in the Meiji Hokkaido-Tokachi Oval, in Obihiro, Japan, were held on the weekend of 14–16 November 2014.

Race one was won by Lee Sang-hwa of South Korea, while Nao Kodaira of Japan came second, and Olga Fatkulina of Russia came third. Vanessa Bittner of Austria won Division B of race one, and was thus, under the rules, automatically promoted to Division A for race two.

In race two, the top two were the same as in race one, Lee and Kodaira, while Bittner took the bronze with a new Austrian record on both senior and junior level. Park Seung-hi of South Korea won Division B of race two.

== Race 1 ==
Race one took place on Friday, 14 November, with Division B scheduled in the morning session, at 11:54, and Division A scheduled in the afternoon session, at 16:22.

=== Division A ===
Rank	Name	Nat.	Pair	Lane	Time	WC points	GWC points
1st place, gold medalist(s)	Lee Sang-hwa	(South Korea)	10	i	38.07	100	50
2nd place, silver medalist(s)	Nao Kodaira	(Japan)	5	o	38.18	80	40
3rd place, bronze medalist(s)	Olga Fatkulina	(Russia)	10	o	38.50	70	35
4	Judith Hesse	(Germany)	9	o	38.736	60	30
5	Margot Boer	(Netherlands)	7	i	38.738	50	25
6	Floor van den Brandt	(Netherlands)	4	o	38.78	45	—
7	Yekaterina Aydova	(Kazakhstan)	3	i	38.80	40	
8	Li Qishi	(China)	3	o	38.83	36	
9	Thijsje Oenema	(Netherlands)	8	o	38.90	32	
10	Arisa Go	(Japan)	4	i	39.00	28	
11	Karolína Erbanová	(Czech Republic)	6	o	39.02	24	
12	Bo van der Werff	(Netherlands)	1	o	39.03	21	
13	Zhang Hong	(China)	8	i	39.05	18	
14	Miyako Sumiyoshi	(Japan)	6	i	39.12	16	
15	Anice Das	(Netherlands)	5	i	39.16	14	
16	Maki Tsuji	(Japan)	9	i	39.25	12	
17	Marsha Hudey	(Canada)	1	i	39.34	10	
18	Nadezhda Aseyeva	(Russia)	2	o	39.36	8	
19	Denise Roth	(Germany)	7	o	39.60	6	
20	Gabriele Hirschbichler	(Germany)	2	i	39.77	5	

=== Division B ===
Rank	Name	Nat.	Pair	Lane	Time	WC points
1	Vanessa Bittner	(Austria)	6	i	38.50	25
2	Park Seung-hi	(South Korea)	2	i	39.330	19
3	Huawei Li	(China)	3	i	39.334	15
4	Angelina Golikova	(Russia)	7	i	39.34	11
5	Yuliya Kozyreva	(Russia)	5	o	39.40	8
6	Jang Mi	(South Korea)	7	o	39.41	6
7	Lee Bo-ra	(South Korea)	4	i	39.64	4
8	Heather McLean	(Canada)	5	i	39.69	2
9	Mio Kuroiwa	(Japan)	3	o	39.79	1
10	Zhang Yue	(China)	6	o	39.99	—
11	Alexandra Ianculescu	(Canada)	4	i	40.05	
12	Yvonne Daldossi	(Italy)	1	i	40.31	
13	Tamara Oudenaarden	(Canada)	2	o	40.39	
14	Ágota Lykovcán	(Hungary)	1	o	40.70	

== Race 2 ==
Race two took place on Sunday, 16 November, with Division B scheduled in the morning session, at 12:30, and Division A scheduled in the afternoon session, at 16:13.

=== Division A ===
Rank	Name	Nat.	Pair	Lane	Time	WC points	GWC points
1st place, gold medalist(s)	Lee Sang-hwa	(South Korea)	10	o	37.92	100	50
2nd place, silver medalist(s)	Nao Kodaira	(Japan)	10	i	38.06	80	40
3rd place, bronze medalist(s)	Vanessa Bittner	(Austria)	9	o	38.33 NR	70	35
4	Margot Boer	(Netherlands)	8	o	38.447	60	30
5	Maki Tsuji	(Japan)	2	o	38.449	50	25
6	Olga Fatkulina	(Russia)	9	i	38.49	45	—
7	Thijsje Oenema	(Netherlands)	5	i	38.62	40	
8	Floor van den Brandt	(Netherlands)	7	i	38.82	36	
9	Bo van der Werff	(Netherlands)	3	i	38.84	32	
10	Miyako Sumiyoshi	(Japan)	4	o	38.85	28	
11	Karolína Erbanová	(Czech Republic)	4	i	38.87	24	
12	Judith Hesse	(Germany)	8	i	38.93	21	
13	Nadezhda Aseyeva	(Russia)	2	i	38.95	18	
14	Anice Das	(Netherlands)	3	o	39.05	16	
15	Arisa Go	(Japan)	6	o	39.09	14	
16	Zhang Hong	(China)	5	o	39.19	12	
17	Li Qishi	(China)	6	i	39.21	10	
18	Marsha Hudey	(Canada)	1	o	39.44	8	
19	Denise Roth	(Germany)	1	i	39.63	6	
20	Gabriele Hirschbichler	(Germany)	7	o	39.82	5	

Notes: NR = national record.

=== Division B ===
Rank	Name	Nat.	Pair	Lane	Time	WC points
1	Park Seung-hi	(South Korea)	6	o	39.05	25
2	Angelina Golikova	(Russia)	4	o	39.19	19
3	Jang Mi	(South Korea)	5	i	39.29	15
4	Lee Bo-ra	(South Korea)	3	o	39.32	11
5	Yuliya Kozyreva	(Russia)	6	i	39.35	8
6	Heather McLean	(Canada)	2	o	39.51	6
7	Li Huawei	(China)	5	o	39.71	4
8	Alexandra Ianculescu	(Canada)	2	i	39.73	2
9	Mio Kuroiwa	(Japan)	4	i	39.94	1
10	Yvonne Daldossi	(Italy)	1	o	39.95	—
11	Zhang Yue	(China)	3	i	39.96	
12	Tamara Oudenaarden	(Canada)	1	i	40.38	
