= 2014–15 ISU Speed Skating World Cup – World Cup 1 – Women's 1000 metres =

The women's 1000 metres race of the 2014–15 ISU Speed Skating World Cup 1, arranged in the Meiji Hokkaido-Tokachi Oval, in Obihiro, Japan, was held on 15 November 2014.

Marrit Leenstra of the Netherlands won, followed by Ireen Wüst of the Netherlands in second place, and Li Qishi of China in third place. Vanessa Bittner of Austria won Division B.

== Results ==
The race took place on Saturday, 15 November, with Division B scheduled in the morning session, at 12:25, and Division A scheduled in the afternoon session, at 15:00.

=== Division A ===
Rank	Name	Nat.	Pair	Lane	Time	WC points	GWC points
1st place, gold medalist(s)	Marrit Leenstra	(Netherlands)	9	o	1:16.23	100	100
2nd place, silver medalist(s)	Ireen Wüst	(Netherlands)	10	i	1:16.34	80	80
3rd place, bronze medalist(s)	Li Qishi	(China)	1	i	1:16.54	70	70
4	Zhang Hong	(China)	3	i	1:16.78	60	60
5	Lee Sang-hwa	(South Korea)	8	i	1:17.03	50	50
6	Karolína Erbanová	(Czech Republic)	8	o	1:17.05	45	—
7	Olga Fatkulina	(Russia)	9	i	1:17.16	40	
8	Nao Kodaira	(Japan)	7	o	1:17.23	36	
9	Judith Hesse	(Germany)	6	o	1:17.33	32	
10	Yekaterina Aydova	(Kazakhstan)	4	i	1:17.35	28	
11	Yuliya Skokova	(Russia)	7	i	1:17.41	24	
12	Sanneke de Neeling	(Netherlands)	5	i	1:17.730	21	
13	Park Seung-hi	(South Korea)	1	o	1:17.733	18	
14	Roxanne van Hemert	(Netherlands)	5	o	1:17.89	16	
15	Nadezhda Aseyeva	(Russia)	4	o	1:18.06	14	
16	Ivanie Blondin	(Canada)	2	i	1:18.09	12	
17	Kali Christ	(Canada)	6	i	1:18.23	10	
18	Gabriele Hirschbichler	(Germany)	3	o	1:18.26	8	
19	Laurine van Riessen	(Netherlands)	10	o	1:18.66	6	
20	Nana Takagi	(Japan)	2	o	1:19.00	5	

=== Division B ===
Rank	Name	Nat.	Pair	Lane	Time	WC points
1	Vanessa Bittner	(Austria)	4	i	1:16.77	25
2	Ida Njåtun	(Norway)	2	i	1:17.99	19
3	Miyako Sumiyoshi	(Japan)	6	o	1:18.35	15
4	Miho Takagi	(Japan)	7	i	1:18.40	11
5	Ayaka Kikuchi	(Japan)	8	o	1:18.99	8
6	Liu Yichi	(China)	5	o	1:19.45	6
7	Jang Mi	(South Korea)	5	i	1:19.56	4
8	Angelina Golikova	(Russia)	7	o	1:19.58	2
9	Margarita Ryzhova	(Russia)	6	i	1:19.68	1
10	Sha Yuning	(China)	8	i	1:20.05	—
11	Katarzyna Woźniak	(Poland)	4	o	1:20.42	
12	Zhang Xin	(China)	9	o	1:20.49	
13	Alexandra Ianculescu	(Canada)	3	o	1:21.12	
14	Denise Roth	(Germany)	9	i	1:21.30	
15	Heather McLean	(Canada)	2	o	1:21.43	
16	Yvonne Daldossi	(Italy)	3	i	1:22.50	
17	Ágota Lykovcán	(Hungary)	1	i	DNS	
