= 2014–15 ISU Speed Skating World Cup – World Cup 4 – Men's 5000 metres =

The men's 5000 metres race of the 2014–15 ISU Speed Skating World Cup 4, arranged in the Thialf arena in Heerenveen, Netherlands, was held on 13 December 2014.

Sven Kramer of the Netherlands won, followed by Jorrit Bergsma of the Netherlands in second place, and Wouter olde Heuvel of the Netherlands in third place. Viktor Hald Torup of Denmark set a new national record, and Nils van der Poel of Sweden won Division B on a new national record for juniors.

== Results ==
The race took place on Saturday, 13 December, with Division B scheduled in the morning session, at 11:29, and Division A scheduled in the afternoon session, at 14:46.

=== Division A ===
| Rank | Name | Nat. | Pair | Lane | Time | WC points | GWC points |
|---|---|---|---|---|---|---|---|
| 1st place, gold medalist(s) | Sven Kramer | (Netherlands) | 4 | i | 6:12.74 | 100 | 100 |
| 2nd place, silver medalist(s) | Jorrit Bergsma | (Netherlands) | 5 | o | 6:14.08 | 80 | 80 |
| 3rd place, bronze medalist(s) | Wouter olde Heuvel | (Netherlands) | 2 | i | 6:19.58 | 70 | 70 |
| 4 | Bob de Jong | (Netherlands) | 8 | i | 6:20.48 | 60 | 60 |
| 5 | Sverre Lunde Pedersen | (Norway) | 7 | i | 6:22.56 | 50 | 50 |
| 6 | Aleksandr Rumyantsev | (Russia) | 8 | o | 6:23.07 | 45 | — |
| 7 | Bart Swings | (Belgium) | 7 | o | 6:24.67 | 40 | |
| 8 | Patrick Beckert | (Germany) | 6 | o | 6:24.78 | 35 | |
| 9 | Alexis Contin | (France) | 1 | o | 6:25.37 | 30 | |
| 10 | Douwe de Vries | (Netherlands) | 6 | i | 6:27.00 | 25 | |
| 11 | Andrea Giovannini | (Italy) | 3 | o | 6:30.59 | 21 | |
| 12 | Yevgeny Seryaev | (Russia) | 3 | i | 6:31.81 | 18 | |
| 13 | Lee Seung-hoon | (South Korea) | 5 | i | 6:32.50 | 16 | |
| 14 | Jan Szymański | (Poland) | 4 | o | 6:33.51 | 14 | |
| 15 | Danila Semerikov | (Russia) | 2 | o | 6:37.58 | 12 | |
| 16 | Jordan Belchos | (Canada) | 1 | i | 6:41.29 | 10 | |

=== Division B ===
| Rank | Name | Nat. | Pair | Lane | Time | WC points |
|---|---|---|---|---|---|---|
| 1 | Nils van der Poel | (Sweden) | 8 | i | 6:23.40 NRJ | 32 |
| 2 | Håvard Bøkko | (Norway) | 1 | i | 6:26.86 | 27 |
| 3 | Ted-Jan Bloemen | (Canada) | 13 | o | 6:27.31 | 23 |
| 4 | Danil Sinitsyn | (Russia) | 12 | i | 6:29.45 | 19 |
| 5 | Shane Williamson | (Japan) | 11 | i | 6:29.86 | 15 |
| 6 | Viktor Hald Thorup | (Denmark) | 4 | o | 6:31.43 NR | 11 |
| 7 | Sergey Gryaztsov | (Russia) | 12 | o | 6:32.14 | 9 |
| 8 | Ole Bjørnsmoen Næss | (Norway) | 5 | i | 6:32.42 | 7 |
| 9 | Marco Weber | (Germany) | 10 | i | 6:32.52 | 6 |
| 10 | Peter Michael | (New Zealand) | 10 | o | 6:34.43 | 5 |
| 11 | Vitaly Mikhailov | (Belarus) | 3 | i | 6:35.81 | 4 |
| 12 | Kim Cheol-min | (South Korea) | 9 | i | 6:36.40 | 3 |
| 13 | Dmitry Babenko | (Kazakhstan) | 2 | o | 6:37.00 | 2 |
| 14 | Luca Stefani | (Italy) | 7 | i | 6:37.15 | 1 |
| 15 | Alexej Baumgärtner | (Germany) | 13 | i | 6:38.87 | — |
| 16 | Fredrik van der Horst | (Norway) | 7 | o | 6:39.26 | |
| 17 | Masahito Obayashi | (Japan) | 9 | o | 6:39.42 | |
| 18 | Martin Hänggi | (Switzerland) | 8 | o | 6:39.96 | |
| 19 | Ko Byung-wook | (South Korea) | 6 | i | 6:40.13 | |
| 20 | Rehanbai Talabuhan | (China) | 5 | o | 6:44.34 | |
| 21 | Liu Yiming | (China) | 11 | o | 6:44.84 | |
| 22 | Edwin Park | (United States) | 4 | i | 6:46.12 | |
| 23 | Piotr Puszkarski | (Poland) | 1 | o | 6:49.42 | |
| 24 | Reyon Kay | (New Zealand) | 3 | o | 6:54.33 | |
| 25 | Artur Sergiyenko | (Kazakhstan) | 2 | i | 6:58.55 | |
| 26 | Adrian Wielgat | (Poland) | 6 | o | DQ | |

Notes: NR = national record, NRJ = national record for juniors.
