= 2014–15 ISU Speed Skating World Cup – World Cup 1 – Men's 500 metres =

The men's 500 metres races of the 2014–15 ISU Speed Skating World Cup 1, arranged in the Meiji Hokkaido-Tokachi Oval, in Obihiro, Japan, were held on the weekend of 14–16 November 2014.

Race one was won by Jan Smeekens of the Netherlands, while Pavel Kulizhnikov of Russia came second, and Ruslan Murashov of Russia came third. Aleksey Yesin of Russia won Division B of race one, and was thus, under the rules, automatically promoted to Division A for race two.

In race two, Kulizhnikov ended ahead of Smeekens, with Ryohei Haga of Japan in third place. Artyom Kuznetsov of Russia won Division B of race two.

== Race 1 ==
Race one took place on Friday, 14 November, with Division B scheduled in the morning session, at 12:13, and Division A scheduled in the afternoon session, at 16:47.

=== Division A ===
Rank	Name	Nat.	Pair	Lane	Time	WC points	GWC points
1st place, gold medalist(s)	Jan Smeekens	(Netherlands)	9	i	35.06	100	50
2nd place, silver medalist(s)	Pavel Kulizhnikov	(Russia)	8	i	35.16	80	40
3rd place, bronze medalist(s)	Ruslan Murashov	(Russia)	2	o	35.246	70	35
4	Hein Otterspeer	(Netherlands)	10	i	35.248	60	30
5	Nico Ihle	(Germany)	5	o	35.316	50	25
6	Laurent Dubreuil	(Canada)	8	o	35.319	45	—
7	Ryohei Haga	(Japan)	5	i	35.32	40	
8	Denis Koval	(Russia)	6	o	35.48	36	
9	Gilmore Junio	(Canada)	4	o	35.50	32	
10	Keiichiro Nagashima	(Japan)	4	i	35.54	28	
11	Espen Aarnes Hvammen	(Norway)	2	i	35.58	24	
12	William Dutton	(Canada)	1	i	35.63	21	
13	Gerben Jorritsma	(Netherlands)	7	i	35.71	18	
14	Mo Tae-bum	(South Korea)	9	o	35.72	16	
15	Yūya Oikawa	(Japan)	6	i	35.76	14	
16	Mirko Giacomo Nenzi	(Italy)	1	o	35.82	12	
17	Daichi Yamanaka	(Japan)	3	o	35.83	10	
18	Pim Schipper	(Netherlands)	10	o	35.90	8	
19	Artur Nogal	(Poland)	3	i	36.07	6	
20	Shani Davis	(United States)	7	o	36.27	5	

=== Division B ===
Rank	Name	Nat.	Pair	Lane	Time	WC points
1	Aleksey Yesin	(Russia)	5	i	35.25	25
2	Artyom Kuznetsov	(Russia)	12	i	35.30	19
3	Kim Jun-ho	(South Korea)	12	o	35.31	15
4	Mu Zhongsheng	(China)	4	i	35.58	11
5	Lee Kang-seok	(South Korea)	9	i	35.68	8
6	Kai Verbij	(Netherlands)	8	i	35.77	6
7	Richard Maclennan	(Canada)	8	o	35.83	4
8	Tsubasa Hasegawa	(Japan)	7	o	35.85	2
9	Xie Jiaxuan	(China)	6	o	35.90	1
10	Wang Nan	(China)	6	i	35.95	—
11	Denny Ihle	(Germany)	10	i	35.98	
12	Samuel Schwarz	(Germany)	5	o	36.01	
13	Vincent De Haître	(South Korea)	11	o	36.03	
14	Håvard Holmefjord Lorentzen	(Norway)	2	i	36.08	
15	Fyodor Mezentsev	(Kazakhstan)	4	o	36.17	
16	Piotr Michalski	(Poland)	7	i	36.18	
17	Denis Kuzin	(Kazakhstan)	9	o	36.26	
18	Sung Ching-Yang	(Chinese Taipei)	11	i	36.34	
19	David Bosa	(Italy)	10	o	36.36	
20	Luca Zanghellini	(Italy)	1	i	36.77	
21	Armin Hager	(Austria)	3	i	37.11	
22	Benjamin Macé	(France)	2	o	37.20	
23	Haralds Silovs	(Latvia)	3	o	DNS	

== Race 2 ==
Race two took place on Sunday, 16 November, with Division B scheduled in the morning session, at 12:49, and Division A scheduled in the afternoon session, at 16:40.

=== Division A ===
Rank	Name	Nat.	Pair	Lane	Time	WC points	GWC points
1st place, gold medalist(s)	Pavel Kulizhnikov	(Russia)	9	o	34.96	100	50
2nd place, silver medalist(s)	Jan Smeekens	(Netherlands)	10	o	35.09	80	40
3rd place, bronze medalist(s)	Ryohei Haga	(Japan)	6	o	35.17	70	35
4	Ruslan Murashov	(Russia)	10	i	35.23	60	30
5	Mo Tae-bum	(South Korea)	5	i	35.261	50	25
6	Espen Aarnes Hvammen	(Norway)	4	o	35.267	45	—
7	Yūya Oikawa	(Japan)	1	o	35.35	40	
8	Laurent Dubreuil	(Canada)	8	i	35.38	36	
9	Keiichiro Nagashima	(Japan)	5	o	35.39	32	
10	Denis Koval	(Russia)	7	i	35.45	28	
11	Nico Ihle	(Germany)	9	i	35.46	24	
12	Aleksey Yesin	(Russia)	7	o	35.48	21	
13	Gilmore Junio	(Canada)	6	i	35.49	18	
14	Gerben Jorritsma	(Netherlands)	2	o	35.61	16	
15	William Dutton	(Canada)	3	o	35.63	14	
16	Mirko Giacomo Nenzi	(Italy)	4	i	35.65	12	
17	Hein Otterspeer	(Netherlands)	8	o	35.75	10	
18	Pim Schipper	(Netherlands)	2	i	35.79	8	
19	Artur Nogal	(Poland)	1	i	35.940	6	
20	Daichi Yamanaka	(Japan)	3	i	35.944	5	

=== Division B ===
Rank	Name	Nat.	Pair	Lane	Time	WC points
1	Artyom Kuznetsov	(Russia)	10	o	34.47	25
2	Kim Jun-ho	(South Korea)	10	i	34.67	19
3	Lee Kang-seok	(South Korea)	8	o	34.75	15
4	Mu Zhongsheng	(China)	9	o	34.82	11
5	Tsubasa Hasegawa	(Japan)	8	i	34.89	8
6	Kai Verbij	(Netherlands)	7	o	34.91	6
7	Richard Maclennan	(Canada)	9	i	34.923	4
8	Denny Ihle	(Germany)	5	o	34.925	2
9	Xie Jiaxuan	(China)	7	i	34.928	1
10	Vincent De Haître	(Canada)	6	i	34.99	—
11	Denis Dressel	(Germany)	2	i	35.03	
12	David Bosa	(Italy)	4	i	35.05	
13	Wang Nan	(China)	6	o	35.06	
14	Piotr Michalski	(Poland)	4	o	35.15	
15	Fyodor Mezentsev	(Kazakhstan)	5	i	35.193	
16	Luca Zanghellini	(Italy)	2	o	35.194	
17	Sung Ching-Yang	(Chinese Taipei)	3	o	35.22	
18	Aleksandr Zhigin	(Kazakhstan)	1	i	35.35	
19	Benjamin Macé	(France)	3	i	35.38	
