= 2014–15 ISU Speed Skating World Cup – World Cup 1 – Men's 1000 metres =

The men's 1000 metres race of the 2014–15 ISU Speed Skating World Cup 1, arranged in the Meiji Hokkaido-Tokachi Oval, in Obihiro, Japan, was held on 15 November 2014.

Pavel Kulizhnikov of Russia won, followed by Kjeld Nuis of the Netherlands in second place, and Samuel Schwarz of Germany in third place. Yang Fan of China won Division B.

== Results ==
The race took place on Saturday, 15 November, with Division B scheduled in the morning session, at 13:07, and Division A scheduled in the afternoon session, at 15:30.

=== Division A ===
Rank	Name	Nat.	Pair	Lane	Time	WC points	GWC points
1st place, gold medalist(s)	Pavel Kulizhnikov	(Russia)	5	i	1:09.23	100	100
2nd place, silver medalist(s)	Kjeld Nuis	(Netherlands)	9	o	1:09.27	80	80
3rd place, bronze medalist(s)	Samuel Schwarz	(Germany)	3	o	1:09.77	70	70
4	Vincent De Haître	(Canada)	4	o	1:09.907	60	60
5	Shani Davis	(United States)	10	o	1:09.908	50	50
6	Koen Verweij	(Netherlands)	8	o	1:09.98	45	—
7	Denny Morrison	(Canada)	10	i	1:10.06	40	
8	Hein Otterspeer	(Netherlands)	7	o	1:10.14	36	
9	Stefan Groothuis	(Netherlands)	9	i	1:10.28	32	
10	Nico Ihle	(Germany)	1	o	1:10.35	28	
11	Denis Kuzin	(Kazakhstan)	8	i	1:10.36	24	
12	Kai Verbij	(Netherlands)	3	i	1:10.40	21	
13	Konrad Niedźwiedzki	(Poland)	1	i	1:40.54	18	
14	Håvard Holmefjord Lorentzen	(Norway)	5	o	1:10.80	16	
15	Kirill Golubev	(Russia)	2	i	1:10.82	14	
16	Aleksey Yesin	(Russia)	2	o	1:10.89	12	
17	Zbigniew Bródka	(Poland)	4	i	1:10.94	10	
18	Mirko Giacomo Nenzi	(Italy)	6	o	1:12.19	8	
19	Jeffrey Swider-Peltz	(United States)	7	i	1:18.66	6	
20	Mo Tae-bum	(South Korea)	6	i	DNF		

=== Division B ===
Rank	Name	Nat.	Pair	Lane	Time	WC points
1	Yang Fan	(China)	11	i	1:10.73	25
2	Sverre Lunde Pedersen	(Norway)	11	o	1:10.89	19
3	Richard Maclennan	(Canada)	10	o	1:11.07	15
4	Li Bailin	(China)	3	i	1:11.08	11
5	Ha Hong-sun	(South Korea)	8	o	1:11.35	8
6	Benjamin Macé	(France)	8	i	1:11.584	6
6	Takuro Oda	(Japan)	2	i	1:11.584	6
8	Fyodor Mezentsev	(Kazakhstan)	12	i	1:11.585	2
9	Denis Dressel	(Germany)	9	i	1:11.59	1
10	Kim Jin-su	(South Korea)	10	i	1:11.74	—
11	Tyler Derraugh	(Canada)	13	o	1:11.76	
12	Shota Nakamura	(Japan)	5	o	1:11.78	
13	Armin Hager	(Austria)	2	o	1:11.79	
14	Kento Nakamura	(Japan)	4	i	1:11.80	
15	Kim Jun-ho	(South Korea)	3	o	1:11.83	
16	Shunsuke Nakamura	(Japan)	13	i	1:11.86	
17	Yuto Fujino	(Japan)	4	o	1:12.02	
18	Bram Smallenbroek	(South Korea)	1	i	1:12.05	
19	Mikhail Kozlov	(Russia)	7	i	1:12.24	
20	Konrád Nagy	(Hungary)	5	i	1:12.51	
21	Bart Swings	(Belgium)	6	i	1:12.77	
22	Aleksandr Zhigin	(Kazakhstan)	9	o	1:12.92	
23	Maksim Baklashkin	(Kazakhstan)	7	o	1:13.17	
24	Piotr Michalski	(Poland)	1	o	1:22.50	
25	David Bosa	(Italy)	6	o	DNF	
26	Espen Aarnes Hvammen	(Norway)	12	o	DNS	
