= 2014–15 ISU Speed Skating World Cup – World Cup 7 – Men's 1500 metres =

The men's 1500 metres race of the 2014–15 ISU Speed Skating World Cup 7, arranged in the Gunda Niemann-Stirnemann-Halle in Erfurt, Germany, was held on 22 March 2015.

== Result ==
The race took place on Sunday, 22 March, scheduled in the afternoon session, at 16:08.

Rank	Name	Nat.	Pair	Lane	Time	WC points	GWC points
1st place, gold medalist(s)	Denny Morrison	(Canada)	4	i	1:46.15	150	150
2nd place, silver medalist(s)	Sverre Lunde Pedersen	(Norway)	6	o	1:46.51	120	120
3rd place, bronze medalist(s)	Bart Swings	(Belgium)	3	o	1:46.81	106	106
4	Konrad Niedźwiedzki	(Poland)	3	i	1:47.11	90	90
5	Thomas Krol	(Netherlands)	4	o	1:47.16	76	76
6	Kjeld Nuis	(Netherlands)	6	i	1:47.55	45	—
7	Wouter olde Heuvel	(Netherlands)	5	o	1:48.19	40	
8	Li Bailin	(China)	2	o	1:48.30	36	
9	Jan Szymański	(Poland)	5	i	1:48.35	32	
10	Zbigniew Bródka	(Poland)	2	i	1:48.54	28	
11	Håvard Holmefjord Lorentzen	(Norway)	1	i	1:50.59	24	
