= 2014–15 ISU Speed Skating World Cup – World Cup 7 – Women's 3000 metres =

The women's 3000 metres race of the 2014–15 ISU Speed Skating World Cup 7, arranged in the Gunda Niemann-Stirnemann-Halle in Erfurt, Germany, was held on 22 March 2015.

== Result ==
The race took place on Sunday, 22 March, scheduled in the afternoon session, at 13:00.

Rank	Name	Nat.	Pair	Lane	Time	WC points	GWC points
1st place, gold medalist(s)	Martina Sáblíková	(Czech Republic)	8	i	4:04.06	150	150
2nd place, silver medalist(s)	Marije Joling	(Netherlands)	7	o	4:05.64	120	120
3rd place, bronze medalist(s)	Diane Valkenburg	(Netherlands)	5	o	4:07.85	106	106
4	Claudia Pechstein	(Germany)	8	o	4:09.14	90	90
5	Carlijn Achtereekte	(Netherlands)	5	i	4:09.67	76	76
6	Carien Kleibeuker	(Netherlands)	1	o	4:10.32	45	—
7	Ivanie Blondin	(Canada)	6	i	4:10.46	40	
8	Ida Njåtun	(Norway)	3	o	4:11.98	36	
9	Jorien Voorhuis	(Netherlands)	7	i	4:12.72	32	
10	Olga Graf	(Russia)	6	o	4:13.38	28	
11	Bente Kraus	(Germany)	4	i	4:14.29	24	
12	Luiza Złotkowska	(Poland)	2	o	4:14.87	21	
13	Yuliya Skokova	(Russia)	4	o	4:15.29	18	
14	Shoko Fujimura	(Japan)	2	i	4:16.59	16	
15	Ayaka Kikuchi	(Japan)	1	i	4:18.74	14	
16	Nana Takagi	(Japan)	3	i	DQ		
