= Anna Chernova =

Russian speed skater (born 1992)

Personal information
- Born: 7 September 1992 (age 33) Kaluga, Russia
- Height: 1.68 m (5 ft 6 in)
- Weight: 57 kg (126 lb)

Sport
- Country: Russia
- Sport: Speed skating

Achievements and titles
- Highest world ranking: 27 (mass start)

Anna Chernova (born 7 September 1992) is a Russian speed skater.

Chernova competed at the 2014 Winter Olympics for Russia. In the 5000 metres she finished 9th overall.

Chernova has won one medal at the World Junior Speed Skating Championships a bronze as part of the Russian team pursuit squad in 2012.

Chernova made her World Cup debut in December 2009. As of September 2014, Chernova's top World Cup finish is 17th in a mass start race at Kolomna in 2012–13. Her best overall finish in the World Cup is 27th, in the 2012–13 mass start.
