= Josie Morrison =

Canadian speed skater (born 1994)

Personal information
- Born: Josie Spence; February 2, 1994 (age 32) Edmonton, Alberta, Canada
- Height: 170 cm (5 ft 7 in)
- Weight: 65 kg (143 lb)
- Spouse: Denny Morrison (m. 2017)

Sport
- Country: Canada

Achievements and titles
- Olympic finals: 2018 Winter Olympics
- Highest world ranking: 500=39.71; 1,000=1.17:00; 1,500=1.57:55; 3,000=4.03:79; 5,000=7.04:76

Josie Morrison (née Spence, born February 2, 1994) is a Canadian speed skater.

== Career ==
=== 2018 Winter Olympics ===
In January 2018, Morrison was named to Canada's 2018 Olympic team.

== Records ==
=== Personal records ===
Personal records
Women's speed skating
Event	Result	Date	Location	Notes
500 m	39,71	06.01.2013	Calgary	
1000 m	1.17,00	18.03.2017	Calgary	
1500 m	1.57,55	06.01.2018	Calgary	
3000 m	4.03,79	01.02.2017	Calgary	
5000 m	7.04,76	20.11.2015	Salt Lake City	
