= Alexej Baumgärtner =

German speed skater

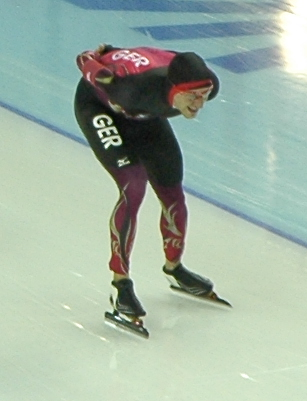

Personal information
- Born: 13 July 1988 (age 37) Glasov, Russian SSR, Soviet Union
- Height: 5 ft 11 in (180 cm)
- Weight: 183 lb (83 kg)

Sport
- Country: Germany
- Sport: Speed skating

Achievements and titles
- Highest world ranking: 7 (mass start)

Alexej Baumgärtner (also spelled Baumgaertner; born 13 July 1988) is a Russian-born German speed skater.

Baumgärtner competed at the 2014 Winter Olympics for Germany. In the 5000 metres he finished 21st, and in the 10000 metres he was 13th.

As of September 2014, Baumgärtner's best performance at the World Single Distance Speed Skating Championships is 8th, in the 2012 10000 metres. He won a silver medal at the 2007 World Junior Speed Skating Championships as part of the German team pursuit squad.

Baumgärtner made his World Cup debut in January 2009. As of September 2014, Baumgärtner has three podium finishes, as part of the German team pursuit squad. His best individual World Cup finish is 5th, in a mass start race at Heerenveen in 2011–12. His best overall finish in the World Cup is 7th, in the mass start in 2011–12.

== World Cup podiums ==
Date	Season	Location	Rank	Event
20 November 2011	2011–12	Chelyabinsk	3rd place, bronze medalist(s)	Team pursuit
4 December 2011	2011–12	Heerenveen	3rd place, bronze medalist(s)	Team pursuit
12 February 2012	2011–12	Hamar	3rd place, bronze medalist(s)	Team pursuit
