= Bente Kraus =

German speed skater

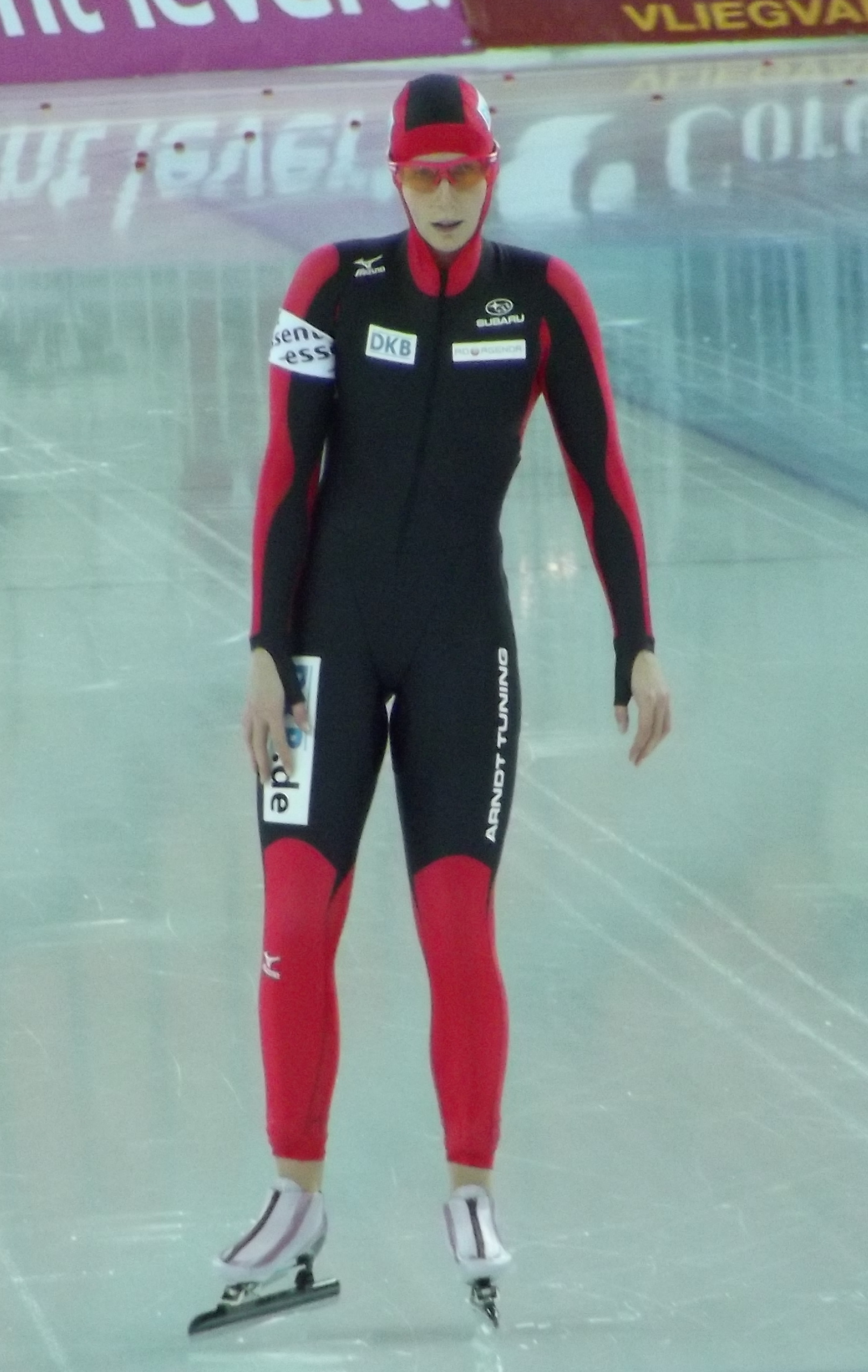
- Kraus in 2013

Personal information
- Born: 21 February 1989 (age 37) Berlin, Germany
- Height: 5.64 ft (172 cm)
- Weight: 150 lb (68 kg)

Sport
- Country: Germany
- Sport: Speed skating

Bente Kraus (born 21 February 1989) is a German speed skater. She finished seventh in the women's 5000 metres event and eighth in the women's 3000 metres event at the 2013 World Single Distance Championships. She also had attended the 2014 Sochi Olympics where she received no medals.
